= Toutouh =

Toutouh is a surname. Notable people with the surname include:

- Marouan Toutouh (born 1994), Moroccan-Dutch kickboxer
- Youssef Toutouh (born 1992), Danish footballer
