= 2019 in Kunlun Fight =

Information
- First date: February 4
- Last date: December 25

The year 2019 was the 6th year in the history of the Kunlun Fight, a kickboxing promotion based in China. 2019 started with Kunlun Fight 80.

The events were broadcasts through television agreements in mainland China with Jiangsu TV and around the world with various other channels. The events were also streamed live on Xigua Video. Traditionally, most Kunlun Fight events have both tournament fights and superfights (single fights).

== 2019 KLF Tournament Champions ==
Weight Class	Champion	Runner-up	Event	Date	Tournament Bracket
KLF 100+ kg World Championship Tournament	(Ukraine) Roman Kryklia	(Iran) Iraj Azizpour	Kunlun Fight 80	February 24, 2019	KLF 100+ kg World Championship Tournament bracket
KLF 75 kg World Championship Tournament	(Belarus) Vitaly Gurkov	(Thailand) Saiyok Pumpanmuang	Kunlun Fight 81	July 27, 2019	KLF 75 kg World Championship Tournament bracket
KLF 70 kg Intercontinental Championship Tournament	(Belarus) Dzianis Zuev	(Russia) Artem Pashporin	Kunlun Fight 83	September 14, 2019	KLF 70 kg Intercontinental Championship Tournament bracket
2019 KLF Future Star 30 kg Championship Tournament	(China) Liu Ziyuan	(China) Shi Zhe	Kunlun Fight 88	December 25, 2019	KLF Future Star 30 kg Championship Tournament bracket

== Events lists ==
=== List of Kunlun Fight events ===
#	Date	Event	Venue	Location
108	December 25, 2019	Kunlun Fight 88	Yiwu International Expo Center	Yiwu, China
107	October 4, 2019	Kunlun Fight 87		Tongliao, Inner Mongolia, China
106	October 3, 2019	Kunlun Fight 86		Tongliao, Inner Mongolia, China
105	October 2, 2019	Kunlun Fight 85		Tongliao, Inner Mongolia, China
104	September 15, 2019	Kunlun Fight 84	Chishui Stadium	Zunyi, China
103	September 14, 2019	Kunlun Fight 83	Chishui Stadium	Zunyi, China
102	September 13, 2019	Kunlun Fight 82	Chishui Stadium	Zunyi, China
101	July 27, 2019	Kunlun Fight 81	Kunlun Fight World Combat Sports Center	Beijing, China
100	February 24, 2019	Kunlun Fight 80	Shanghai Chongming Stadium	Shanghai, China

=== List of Kunlun Combat Professional League events ===
#	Date	Event	Venue	Location
148	December 24, 2019	Kunlun Combat Professional League - Shenzhen vs. Shenyang - 2019 League Final	Yiwu International Expo Center	Yiwu, China
147	December 1, 2019	Kunlun Combat Professional League - Shenzhen vs. Zunyi - League Playoff Semifinal	Kunlun Fight Stadium	Tongling, Anhui, China
146	December 1, 2019	Kunlun Combat Professional League - Shenyang vs. Kunshan - League Playoff Semifinal	Kunlun Fight Stadium	Tongling, Anhui, China
145	November 17, 2019	Kunlun Combat Professional League - Zunyi vs. Changsha - League Playoff Quarterfinal	Kunlun Fight Stadium	Tongling, Anhui, China
144	November 17, 2019	Kunlun Combat Professional League - Shenzhen vs. Shanghai - League Playoff Quarterfinal	Kunlun Fight Stadium	Tongling, Anhui, China
143	November 16, 2019	Kunlun Combat Professional League - Kunshan vs. Zhengzhou - League Playoff Quarterfinal	Kunlun Fight Stadium	Tongling, Anhui, China
142	November 16, 2019	Kunlun Combat Professional League - Shenyang vs. Chengdu - League Playoff Quarterfinal	Kunlun Fight Stadium	Tongling, Anhui, China
141	November 3, 2019	Kunlun Combat Professional League - Shanghai vs. Sanmenxia	Kunlun Fight Stadium	Tongling, Anhui, China
140	November 3, 2019	Kunlun Combat Professional League - Changsha vs. Qingdao	Kunlun Fight Stadium	Tongling, Anhui, China
139	November 2, 2019	Kunlun Combat Professional League - Zunyi vs. Jinan	Kunlun Fight Stadium	Tongling, Anhui, China
138	November 2, 2019	Kunlun Combat Professional League - Shenzhen vs. Yinchuan	Kunlun Fight Stadium	Tongling, Anhui, China
137	November 1, 2019	Kunlun Combat Professional League - Beijing vs. Chengdu	Kunlun Fight Stadium	Tongling, Anhui, China
136	November 1, 2019	Kunlun Combat Professional League - Zhengzhou vs. Wenzhou	Kunlun Fight Stadium	Tongling, Anhui, China
135	October 31, 2019	Kunlun Combat Professional League - Kunshan vs. Guangzhou	Kunlun Fight Stadium	Tongling, Anhui, China
134	October 31, 2019	Kunlun Combat Professional League - Shenyang vs. Wuhan	Kunlun Fight Stadium	Tongling, Anhui, China
133	October 20, 2019	Kunlun Combat Professional League - Shanghai vs. Chengdu	Kunlun Fight Stadium	Tongling, Anhui, China
132	October 20, 2019	Kunlun Combat Professional League - Wenzhou vs. Changsha	Kunlun Fight Stadium	Tongling, Anhui, China
131	October 19, 2019	Kunlun Combat Professional League - Beijing vs. Sanmenxia	Kunlun Fight Stadium	Tongling, Anhui, China
130	October 19, 2019	Kunlun Combat Professional League - Qingdao vs. Zhengzhou	Kunlun Fight Stadium	Tongling, Anhui, China
129	October 18, 2019	Kunlun Combat Professional League - Zunyi vs. Guangzhou	Kunlun Fight Stadium	Tongling, Anhui, China
128	October 18, 2019	Kunlun Combat Professional League - Shenzhen vs. Wuhan	Kunlun Fight Stadium	Tongling, Anhui, China
127	October 17, 2019	Kunlun Combat Professional League - Jinan vs. Kunshan	Kunlun Fight Stadium	Tongling, Anhui, China
126	October 17, 2019	Kunlun Combat Professional League - Shenyang vs. Yinchuan	Kunlun Fight Stadium	Tongling, Anhui, China
125	August 18, 2019	Kunlun Combat Professional League - Zhengzhou vs. Qingdao - Northern Group Round 7		Tongliao, Inner Mongolia, China
Zhengzhou vs. Qingdao fights took place on Kunlun Fight 85.
125	August 18, 2019	Kunlun Combat Professional League - Chengdu vs. Wuhan	Kunlun Fight Stadium	Tongling, Anhui, China
124	August 17, 2019	Kunlun Combat Professional League - Wenzhou vs. Zunyi	Kunlun Fight Stadium	Tongling, Anhui, China
123	July 14, 2019	Kunlun Combat Professional League - Chengdu vs. Shenzhen - Southern Group Round 7	Kunlun Fight Stadium	Tongling, Anhui, China
122	July 13, 2019	Kunlun Combat Professional League - Changsha vs. Zunyi - Southern Group Round 7	Kunlun Fight Stadium	Tongling, Anhui, China
121	July 12, 2019	Kunlun Combat Professional League - Wuhan vs. Wenzhou - Southern Group Round 7	Kunlun Fight Stadium	Tongling, Anhui, China
120	July 11, 2019	Kunlun Combat Professional League - Shanghai vs. Guangzhou - Southern Group Round 7	Kunlun Fight Stadium	Tongling, Anhui, China
119	July 7, 2019	Kunlun Combat Professional League - Kunshan vs. Shenyang - Northern Group Round 6	Kunlun Fight Stadium	Tongling, Anhui, China
118	July 6, 2019	Kunlun Combat Professional League - Beijing vs. Qingdao - Northern Group Round 6	Kunlun Fight Stadium	Tongling, Anhui, China
117	July 6, 2019	Kunlun Combat Professional League - Jinan vs. Yinchuan - Northern Group Round 6	Kunlun Fight Stadium	Tongling, Anhui, China
116	July 5, 2019	Kunlun Combat Professional League - Sanmenxia vs. Zhengzhou - Northern Group Round 6	Kunlun Fight Stadium	Tongling, Anhui, China
115	June 30, 2019	Kunlun Combat Professional League - Chengdu vs. Shanghai - Southern Group Round 6	Kunlun Fight Stadium	Tongling, Anhui, China
114	June 29, 2019	Kunlun Combat Professional League - Shenzhen vs. Wuhan - Southern Group Round 6	Kunlun Fight Stadium	Tongling, Anhui, China
113	June 28, 2019	Kunlun Combat Professional League - Zunyi vs. Guangzhou - Southern Group Round 6	Kunlun Fight Stadium	Tongling, Anhui, China
112	June 27, 2019	Kunlun Combat Professional League - Wenzhou vs. Changsha - Southern Group Round 6	Kunlun Fight Stadium	Tongling, Anhui, China
111	June 23, 2019	Kunlun Combat Professional League - Shenyang vs. Kunshan - Northern Group Round 5	Kunlun Fight Stadium	Tongling, Anhui, China
110	June 22, 2019	Kunlun Combat Professional League - Zhengzhou vs. Sanmenxia - Northern Group Round 5	Kunlun Fight Stadium	Tongling, Anhui, China
109	June 21, 2019	Kunlun Combat Professional League - Qingdao vs. Beijing - Northern Group Round 5	Kunlun Fight Stadium	Tongling, Anhui, China
108	June 20, 2019	Kunlun Combat Professional League - Yinchuan vs. Jinan - Northern Group Round 5	Kunlun Fight Stadium	Tongling, Anhui, China
107	June 16, 2019	Kunlun Combat Professional League - Guangzhou vs. Changsha - Southern Group Round 5	Kunlun Fight Stadium	Tongling, Anhui, China
106	June 15, 2019	Kunlun Combat Professional League - Wuhan vs. Zunyi - Southern Group Round 5	Kunlun Fight Stadium	Tongling, Anhui, China
105	June 15, 2019	Kunlun Combat Professional League - Shanghai vs. Shenzhen - Southern Group Round 5	Kunlun Fight Stadium	Tongling, Anhui, China
104	June 14, 2019	Kunlun Combat Professional League - Chengdu vs. Wenzhou - Southern Group Round 5	Kunlun Fight Stadium	Tongling, Anhui, China
103	June 9, 2019	Kunlun Combat Professional League - Sanmenxia vs. Kunshan - Northern Group Round 4	Kunlun Fight Stadium	Tongling, Anhui, China
102	June 8, 2019	Kunlun Combat Professional League - Qingdao vs. Jinan - Northern Group Round 4	Kunlun Fight Stadium	Tongling, Anhui, China
101	June 7, 2019	Kunlun Combat Professional League - Yinchuan vs. Zhengzhou - Northern Group Round 4	Kunlun Fight Stadium	Tongling, Anhui, China
100	June 6, 2019	Kunlun Combat Professional League - Beijing vs. Shenyang - Northern Group Round 4	Kunlun Fight Stadium	Tongling, Anhui, China
99	June 2, 2019	Kunlun Combat Professional League - Wuhan vs. Chengdu - Southern Group Round 4	Kunlun Fight Stadium	Tongling, Anhui, China
98	June 1, 2019	Kunlun Combat Professional League - Changsha vs. Shenzhen - Southern Group Round 4	Kunlun Fight Stadium	Tongling, Anhui, China
97	May 31, 2019	Kunlun Combat Professional League - Wenzhou vs. Guangzhou - Southern Group Round 4	Kunlun Fight Stadium	Tongling, Anhui, China
96	May 30, 2019	Kunlun Combat Professional League - Zunyi vs. Shanghai - Southern Group Round 4	Kunlun Fight Stadium	Tongling, Anhui, China
95	May 19, 2019	Kunlun Combat Professional League - Jinan vs. Qingdao - Northern Group Round 3	Kunlun Fight Stadium	Tongling, Anhui, China
94	May 19, 2019	Kunlun Combat Professional League - Kunshan vs. Sanmenxia - Northern Group Round 3	Kunlun Fight Stadium	Tongling, Anhui, China
93	May 19, 2019	Kunlun Combat Professional League - Shenyang vs. Beijing - Northern Group Round 3	Kunlun Fight Stadium	Tongling, Anhui, China
92	May 18, 2019	Kunlun Combat Professional League - Zhengzhou vs. Yinchuan - Northern Group Round 3	Kunlun Fight Stadium	Tongling, Anhui, China
91	May 18, 2019	Kunlun Combat Professional League - Chengdu vs. Guangzhou - Southern Group Round 3	Kunlun Fight Stadium	Tongling, Anhui, China
90	May 17, 2019	Kunlun Combat Professional League - Shenzhen vs. Zunyi - Southern Group Round 3	Kunlun Fight Stadium	Tongling, Anhui, China
89	May 17, 2019	Kunlun Combat Professional League - Wuhan vs. Changsha - Southern Group Round 3	Kunlun Fight Stadium	Tongling, Anhui, China
88	May 12, 2019	Kunlun Combat Professional League - Wenzhou vs. Shanghai - Southern Group Round 3	Kunlun Fight Stadium	Tongling, Anhui, China
87	April 21, 2019	Kunlun Combat Professional League - Sanmenxia vs. Qingdao - Northern Group Round 2	Kunlun Fight Stadium	Tongling, Anhui, China
86	April 21, 2019	Kunlun Combat Professional League - Zhengzhou vs. Jinan - Northern Group Round 2	Kunlun Fight Stadium	Tongling, Anhui, China
85	April 20, 2019	Kunlun Combat Professional League - Shenyang vs. Yinchuan - Northern Group Round 2	Kunlun Fight Stadium	Tongling, Anhui, China
84	April 20, 2019	Kunlun Combat Professional League - Beijing vs. Kunshan - Northern Group Round 2	Kunlun Fight Stadium	Tongling, Anhui, China
83	April 13, 2019	Kunlun Combat Professional League - Guangzhou vs. Wuhan - Southern Group Round 2	Kunlun Fight Stadium	Tongling, Anhui, China
82	April 12, 2019	Kunlun Combat Professional League - Chengdu vs. Guizhou - Southern Group Round 2	Kunlun Fight Stadium	Tongling, Anhui, China
81	April 12, 2019	Kunlun Combat Professional League - Changsha vs. Shanghai - Southern Group Round 2	Kunlun Fight Stadium	Tongling, Anhui, China
80	April 11, 2019	Kunlun Combat Professional League - Wenzhou vs. Shenzhen - Southern Group Round 2	Kunlun Fight Stadium	Tongling, Anhui, China
79	April 11, 2019	Kunlun Combat Professional League - Beijing vs. Sanmenxia - Northern Group Round 1	Kunlun Fight Stadium	Tongling, Anhui, China
78	April 10, 2019	Kunlun Combat Professional League - Yinchuan vs. Kunshan - Northern Group Round 1	Kunlun Fight Stadium	Tongling, Anhui, China
77	April 10, 2019	Kunlun Combat Professional League - Qingdao vs. Shenyang - Northern Group Round 1	Kunlun Fight Stadium	Tongling, Anhui, China
76	April 9, 2019	Kunlun Combat Professional League - Jinan vs. Zhengzhou - Northern Group Round 1	Kunlun Fight Stadium	Tongling, Anhui, China
75	April 9, 2019	Kunlun Combat Professional League - Changsha vs. Wuhan - Southern Group Round 1	Kunlun Fight Stadium	Tongling, Anhui, China
74	March 24, 2019	Kunlun Combat Professional League - Shenzhen vs. Longyan - Southern Group Round 1	Kunlun Fight Stadium	Tongling, Anhui, China
73	March 23, 2019	Kunlun Combat Professional League - Zunyi vs. Wenzhou - Southern Group Round 1	Kunlun Fight Stadium	Tongling, Anhui, China
72	March 16, 2019	Kunlun Combat Professional League - Shanghai vs. Wuhan - Southern Group Round 1	Kunlun Fight Stadium	Tongling, Anhui, China

==== League Standings ====
===== South Division =====
#	Team	Win	Draw	Loss	KO/TKO	Fights won	Points
1	Shenzhen	5	0	2	9	25	15
2	Zunyi	5	0	2	11	24	15
3	Wenzhou	5	0	2	13	22	15
4	Shanghai	4	1	2	6	20	13
5	Chengdu	3	0	4	2	15	9
6	Changsha	2	1	4	6	12	7
7	Guangzhou	1	1	5	2	14	4
8	Wuhan	1	1	5	3	12	4

===== North Division =====
#	Team	Win	Draw	Loss	KO/TKO	Fights won	Points
1	Shenyang	5	0	2	9	24	15
2	Jinan	4	1	2	2	22	13
3	Qingdao	4	0	3	7	21	12
4	Beijing	4	0	3	9	19	12
5	Sanmenxia	3	1	3	5	21	10
6	Zhengzhou	3	0	4	5	17	9
7	Kunshan	1	1	4	8	12	4
8	Yinchuan	1	1	4	7	11	4

== Kunlun Fight 80 ==
Kunlun Fight 80
- Promotion: Kunlun Fight
- Date: February 24, 2019
- Venue: Shanghai Chongming Stadium
- City: Shanghai, China

Event chronology
Kunlun Fight 79	Kunlun Fight 80	Kunlun Fight 81

Kunlun Fight 80 was a kickboxing event held by Kunlun Fight on February 24, 2019 at the Shanghai Chongming Stadium in Shanghai, China.

=== Background ===
This event featured a 8-man 100+-kilogram Tournaments to earn the 2019 KLF 100+ kg World Championship.

==== 2019 KLF 100+ kg World Championship Tournament bracket ====
Quarterfinals
(China) Asihati	TKO
(England) Daniel Sam	2r.
(Brazil) Haime Morais	MD
(Iran) Iraj Azizpour	3r.
(China) Liu Wei	1r.
(Serbia) Rade Opacic	KO
(Slovakia) Martin Pacas	3r.
(Ukraine) Roman Kryklia	UD

Semifinals
(China) Asihati	1r.
(Iran) Iraj Azizpour^{1}	KO
(Serbia) Rade Opacic	2r.
(Ukraine) Roman Kryklia	TKO

Final
(Iran) Iraj Azizpour	3r.
(Ukraine) Roman Kryklia	UD

^{1}Haime Morais was injured and couldn't participate in the second round of the Grand Prix, and was subsequently replaced by Iraj Azizpour.

=== Results ===
Kunlun Fight 80
Weight Class				Method	Round	Time	Notes
Kickboxing 100+ kg	(Ukraine) Roman Kryklia	def.	(Iran) Iraj Azizpour	Decision (Unanimous)	3	3:00	2019 KLF 100+ kg World Championship Tournament Final
Kickboxing 27 kg	(China) Yan Sheng	def.	(China) Zhang Siyuan	Decision (Unanimous)	2	2:00	KLF Future Star
Kickboxing 33 kg	(China) Liu Hanbo	def.	(China) Zhang Haiyang	Decision (Unanimous)	2	2:00	KLF Future Star
Kickboxing 100+ kg	(Ukraine) Roman Kryklia	def.	(Serbia) Rade Opacic	TKO (3 Knockdown Rule)	2	1:11	2019 KLF 100+ kg World Championship Tournament Semi-Finals B
Kickboxing 100+ kg	(Iran) Iraj Azizpour	def.	(China) Asihati	KO (Punch)	3	1:30	2019 KLF 100+ kg World Championship Tournament Semi-Finals A
Iraj Azizpour lost a decision to Haime Morais in the quarterfinals, but advanced when Morais withdrew because of injury.
Kickboxing 60 kg	(Morocco) Anissa Haddaoui	def.	(China) Zhang Ye	TKO (Knee Injury)	1	1:35	Female Bout
Kickboxing 70 kg	(Georgia (country)) Davit Kiria	def.	(Morocco) Marouan Toutouh	Decision (Majority)	3	3:00	2018 KLF 70 kg World Championship Tournament Final
Kickboxing 70 kg	(China) Zhu Baotong	def.	(Japan) Tomoyuki Nishikawa	Decision (Unanimous)	3	3:00	2018 KLF 70 kg World Championship Tournament Reserve Fight
Kickboxing 70 kg	(Morocco) Marouan Toutouh	def.	(Belarus) Dzianis Zuev	Decision (Majority)	3	3:00	2018 KLF 70 kg World Championship Tournament Semi-Finals B
Kickboxing 70 kg	(Georgia (country)) Davit Kiria	def.	(China) Feng Xingli	KO (Front Kick to the Body)	2	1:45	2018 KLF 70 kg World Championship Tournament Semi-Finals A
Kickboxing 100+ kg	(Ukraine) Roman Kryklia	def.	(Slovakia) Martin Pacas	Decision (Unanimous)	3	3:00	2019 KLF 100+ kg World Championship Tournament Quarter-Finals D
Kickboxing 100+ kg	(Serbia) Rade Opacic	def.	(China) Liu Wei	KO (Punch to the Body)	1	0:43	2019 KLF 100+ kg World Championship Tournament Quarter-Finals C
Kickboxing 100+ kg	(Brazil) Haime Morais	def.	(Iran) Iraj Azizpour	Decision (Majority)	3	3:00	2019 KLF 100+ kg World Championship Tournament Quarter-Finals B
Kickboxing 100+ kg	(China) Asihati	def.	(England) Daniel Sam	TKO (3 Knockdown Rule)	2	2:10	2019 KLF 100+ kg World Championship Tournament Quarter-Finals A

== Kunlun Fight 81 ==
Kunlun Fight 81
- Promotion: Kunlun Fight
- Date: July 27, 2019
- Venue: Kunlun Fight World Combat Sports Center
- City: Beijing, China

Event chronology
Kunlun Fight 80	Kunlun Fight 81	Kunlun Fight 82

Kunlun Fight 81 was a kickboxing event held by Kunlun Fight on July 27, 2019 at the Kunlun Fight World Combat Sports Center in Beijing, China.

=== Background ===
This event featured a 8-man 75-kilogram Tournaments to earn the 2019 KLF 75 kg World Championship.

==== 2019 KLF 75 kg World Championship Tournament bracket ====
Quarterfinals
(China) Xu Liu	3r.
(Thailand) Saiyok Pumpanmuang	UD
(China) Jiao Fukai	MD
(Belarus) Dzianis Zuev	3r.
(China) Elias Emam Muhammat	3r.
(Belarus) Vitaly Gurkov	MD
(China) Wu Sihan	MD
(Kazakhstan) Mergen Bilyalov	3r.

Semifinals
(Thailand) Saiyok Pumpanmuang	MD
(China) Jiao Fukai	3r.
(Belarus) Vitaly Gurkov	TKO
(China) Wu Sihan	2r.

Final
(Thailand) Saiyok Pumpanmuang	3r.
(Belarus) Vitaly Gurkov	UD

=== Results ===
Kunlun Fight 81
Weight Class				Method	Round	Time	Notes
Kickboxing 75 kg	(Belarus) Vitaly Gurkov	def.	(Thailand) Saiyok Pumpanmuang	Decision (Unanimous)	3	3:00	2019 KLF 75 kg World Championship Tournament Final
Kickboxing 70 kg	(China) Kong Lingfeng	def.	(Suriname) Andy Ristie	Ext.R Decision (Unanimous)	4	3:00	
MMA 75 kg	(China) Zhang Lipeng	vs.	(Brazil) Ednilson Barros Santos	Draw (Unanimous)	3	5:00	
Kickboxing 66 kg	(China) Wei Ninghui	def.	(Poland) Bartosz Batra	Decision (Unanimous)	3	3:00	
Kickboxing 75 kg	(Belarus) Vitaly Gurkov	def.	(China) Wu Sihan	TKO (Pucnhes)	2	1:18	2019 KLF 75 kg World Championship Tournament Semi-Finals B
Kickboxing 75 kg	(Thailand) Saiyok Pumpanmuang	def.	(China) Jiao Fukai	Decision (Majority)	3	3:00	2019 KLF 75 kg World Championship Tournament Semi-Finals A
Kickboxing 30 kg	(China) Zhang Xiongliang	def.	(China) Yan Sheng	Decision (Unanimous)	3	2:00	KLF Future Star
MMA 58 kg	(Russia) Andrei Marchenko	def.	(China) Banma Duoji	Decision (Majority)	3	5:00	
Kickboxing 75 kg	(China) Wu Sihan	def.	(Kazakhstan) Mergen Bilyalov	Decision (Majority)	3	3:00	2018 KLF 75 kg World Championship Tournament Quarter-Finals D
Kickboxing 75 kg	(Belarus) Vitaly Gurkov	def.	(China) Elias Emam Muhammat	Decision (Majority)	3	3:00	2019 KLF 75 kg World Championship Tournament Quarter-Finals C
Kickboxing 75 kg	(China) Jiao Fukai	def.	(Belarus) Dzianis Zuev	Decision (Majority)	3	3:00	2019 KLF 75 kg World Championship Tournament Quarter-Finals B
Kickboxing 75 kg	(Thailand) Saiyok Pumpanmuang	def.	(China) Xu Liu	Decision (Unanimous)	3	3:00	2019 KLF 75 kg World Championship Tournament Quarter-Finals A
Kickboxing 75 kg	(China) Zhao Junchen	def.	(China) Sun Weipeng	Decision (Unanimous)	3	3:00	2019 KLF 75 kg World Championship Tournament Reserve Fight
Kickboxing 75 kg	(China) Yang Bin	def.	(Iran) Sohrab Barhrami	KO (Punches)	1	0:41	

== Kunlun Fight 82 ==
Kunlun Fight 82
- Promotion: Kunlun Fight
- Date: September 13, 2019
- Venue: Chishui Stadium
- City: Zunyi, China

Event chronology
Kunlun Fight 81	Kunlun Fight 82	Kunlun Fight 83

Kunlun Fight 82 was a kickboxing event held by Kunlun Fight on September 13, 2019 at the Chishui Stadium in Zunyi, China.

=== Results ===
Kunlun Fight 82
Weight Class				Method	Round	Time	Notes
MMA 60 kg	(Armenia) Valodya Ayvazyan	def.	(China) Zhang Meixuan	TKO (Retirement)	1	5:00	
Kickboxing 67 kg	(Jordan) Izzeddin Nafez	def.	(China) Wei Ninghui	Decision (Unanimous)	3	3:00	
Kickboxing 71 kg	(China) Kong Lingfeng	def.	(Australia) Evarard Augustine	TKO (Referee Stoppage)	3	2:06	
Kickboxing 70 kg	(China) Sun Yaowei	def.	(China) Zhang Ye	Decision (Split)	3	3:00	
Kickboxing 28 kg	(China) Zhang Xiongliang	-	(China) Shi Zhe	Ext.R Draw (Split)	3	2:00	KLF Future Star
Kickboxing 75 kg	(China) Liu Haoyang	def.	(China) Tang Guoliang	KO (Punches)	1	1:05	
Kickboxing 70 kg	(China) Ouyang Feng	def.	(China) Ren Yawei	TKO (Referee Stoppage)	2	2:05	
Kickboxing 65 kg	(China) Zhang Zihao	def.	(China) Zhao Xiran	Decision (Unanimous)	3	3:00	
Kickboxing 63 kg	(China) Wang Shunli	def.	(China) Huang Zixin	Decision (Unanimous)	3	3:00	
Kickboxing 60 kg	(China) Han Jiawei	def.	(China) Zhao Chao	TKO (Corner Stoppage)	3	0:45	
Kickboxing 52.5 kg	(China) Gu Jiayi	def.	(China) Zhang Siyu	Decision (Unanimous)	3	2:00	Female Bout

== Kunlun Fight 83 ==
Kunlun Fight 83
- Promotion: Kunlun Fight
- Date: September 14, 2019
- Venue: Chishui Stadium
- City: Zunyi, China

Event chronology
Kunlun Fight 82	Kunlun Fight 83	Kunlun Fight 84

Kunlun Fight 83 was a kickboxing event held by Kunlun Fight on September 14, 2019 at the Chishui Stadium in Zunyi, China.

=== Background ===
This event featured a 4-man 70-kilogram Tournaments to earn the 2019 KLF 70 kg Intercontinental Championship.

==== 2019 KLF 70 kg Intercontinental Championship Tournament bracket ====
Semifinals
(Belarus) Dzianis Zuev	UD
(China) Zhu Baotong	3r.
(Russia) Artem Pashporin	UD
(China) Song Shaoqiu	3r.

Final
(Belarus) Dzianis Zuev	UD
(Russia) Artem Pashporin	3r.

=== Results ===
Kunlun Fight 83
Weight Class				Method	Round	Time	Notes
Kickboxing 70 kg	(Belarus) Dzianis Zuev	def.	(Russia) Artem Pashporin	Decision (Unanimous)	3	3:00	2019 KLF 70 kg Intercontinental Championship Tournament Final
Kickboxing 75 kg	(Iran) Seyedisa Alamdarnezam	def.	(China) Feng Xingli	Decision (Unanimous)	3	3:00	
MMA 77 kg	(China) Zhang Lipeng	def.	(Iran) Mohmmad Naeemi	Submission (Triangle Choke)	1	4:00	
MMA 67 kg	(Brazil) Jair Roberto	def.	(China) Yan Xibo	Submission (Armbar)	1	1:01	
Kickboxing 70 kg	(Russia) Artem Pashporin	def.	(China) Song Shaoqiu	Decision (Unanimous)	3	3:00	2019 KLF 70 kg Intercontinental Championship Tournament Semi-Finals B
Kickboxing 70 kg	(Belarus) Dzianis Zuev	def.	(China) Zhu Baotong	Decision (Majority)	3	3:00	2019 KLF 70 kg Intercontinental Championship Tournament Semi-Finals A
Kickboxing 60 kg	(China) Zhang Ye	def.	(China) Swasing	Decision (Unanimous)	3	2:00	Female Bout
Kickboxing 70 kg	(Denmark) Niclas Larsen	def.	(China) Liu Hainan	Decision (Unanimous)	3	3:00	70 kg Intercontinental Championship Tournament Reserve Fight
Kickboxing 80 kg	(China) Wang Aogong	def.	(Thailand) Komsan Hanchana	Decision (Unanimous)	3	3:00	

== Kunlun Fight 84 ==
Kunlun Fight 84
- Promotion: Kunlun Fight
- Date: September 15, 2019
- Venue: Chishui Stadium
- City: Zunyi, China

Event chronology
Kunlun Fight 83	Kunlun Fight 84	Kunlun Fight 85

Kunlun Fight 84 was a kickboxing event held by Kunlun Fight on September 15, 2019 at the Chishui Stadium in Zunyi, China.

=== Results ===
Kunlun Fight 84
Weight Class				Method	Round	Time	Notes
Kickboxing 75 kg	(China) Zhang Yang	def.	(Democratic Republic of the Congo) Nayanesh Ayman	Decision (Unanimous)	3	3:00	
Kickboxing 66 kg	(China) Sun Zhixiang	def.	(Thailand) Wacharasat Torsilachai	Decision (Unanimous)	3	3:00	
Kickboxing 75 kg	(China) Ni Jun	def.	(Thailand) Panom Topkingboxing	Decision (Unanimous)	3	3:00	
Kickboxing 70 kg	(China) Luo Chao	def.	(China) Jiao Zhou	Decision (Unanimous)	3	3:00	
Kickboxing 45 kg	(China) Yang Haitao	def.	(China) Zhang Junjie	Decision (Unanimous)	2	2:00	KLF Future Star
Kickboxing 75 kg	(Thailand) Jaimoon Sawettapong	def.	(China) Chen Zijun	Decision (Split)	3	3:00	
Kickboxing 70 kg	(China) Liang Yuanhao	def.	(China) Wang Baoduo	KO (Knees)	1	3:00	
Kickboxing 65 kg	(China) Liu Jiawei	def.	(Madagascar) Jakoba Gilbert	TKO (Retirement)	1	3:00	
Kickboxing 26 kg	(China) Zhang Ziguo	def.	(China) Wu Yizhan	TKO (Referee Stoppage)	2	1:38	KLF Future Star
Kickboxing 63 kg	(China) Jiduoyibu	def.	(Brazil) Davisson Paixao	Decision (Majority)	3	3:00	
Kickboxing 60 kg	(China) Yang Hua	def.	(China) Xiatekeale Manwuerale	Decision (Unanimous)	3	3:00	
Kickboxing 52.5 kg	(China) Zeng Xiaoting	def.	(China) Jiang Yalan	Decision (Unanimous)	3	2:00	Female Bout

== Kunlun Fight 85 ==
Kunlun Fight 85
- Promotion: Kunlun Fight
- Date: October 2, 2019
- City: Tongliao, Inner Mongolia, China

Event chronology
Kunlun Fight 84	Kunlun Fight 85	Kunlun Fight 86

Kunlun Fight 85 was a kickboxing event held by Kunlun Fight on October 2, 2019 in Tongliao, Inner Mongolia, China.

=== Results ===
Kunlun Fight 85
Weight Class				Method	Round	Time	Notes
Kickboxing 77 kg	(Ukraine) Vasily Sorokin	def.	(China) Wu Sihan	TKO (Knee to the Body)	3	1:25	
Kickboxing 75 kg	(Russia) Jamal Yusupov	def.	(China) Liao Shiwu	KO (Punch to the Body)	1	2:09	
Kickboxing 67 kg	(China) Lv Ruilei	def.	(Iran) Ahmad Nikkarchenijani	Decision (Unanimous)	3	3:00	
MMA 70 kg	(China) Aili Mulatebieke	def.	(Tajikistan) Mamurov Akamaljon	Decision (Unanimous)	3	5:00	
Kickboxing 29 kg	(China) Wei Senyu	def.	(China) Niu Yihan	Decision (Unanimous)	2	2:00	KLF Future Star
Kickboxing 75 kg	(China) Lu Wenlong	def.	(Iran) Farhad Mandomi	DQ (Illegal Elbow)	2	0:39	Kunlun Combat Professional League Bout
Kickboxing 70 kg	(Russia) Ilias Iliasov	def.	(China) Zeng Jiawu	Decision (Unanimous)	3	3:00	Kunlun Combat Professional League Bout
Kickboxing 65 kg	(China) Shang Xifeng	def.	(China) Xu Yanwei	Decision (Unanimous)	3	3:00	Kunlun Combat Professional League Bout
Kickboxing 63 kg	(China) Zhang Songshan	def.	(China) You Long	Decision (Majority)	3	3:00	Kunlun Combat Professional League Bout
Kickboxing 60 kg	(China) Huang Jinbin	def.	(China) Hong Wei	TKO (Referee Stoppage)	1	2:59	Kunlun Combat Professional League Bout
Kickboxing 52.5 kg	(China) Chen Xinyang	def.	(China) Wu Yafei	Decision (Unanimous)	3	2:00	Kunlun Combat Professional League Female Bout

== Kunlun Fight 86 ==
Kunlun Fight 86
- Promotion: Kunlun Fight
- Date: October 3, 2019
- City: Tongliao, Inner Mongolia, China

Event chronology
Kunlun Fight 85	Kunlun Fight 86	Kunlun Fight 87

Kunlun Fight 86 was a kickboxing event held by Kunlun Fight on October 3, 2019 in Tongliao, Inner Mongolia, China.

=== Results ===
Kunlun Fight 86
Weight Class				Method	Round	Time	Notes
Kickboxing 70 kg	(Belarus) Dzianis Zuev	def.	(China) Ouyang Feng	Decision (Unanimous)	3	3:00	
Kickboxing 60 kg	(Iran) Ali Zarinfar	def.	(China) Wei Weiyang	Decision (Majority)	3	3:00	
MMA 65 kg	(China) Li Haojie	def.	(Tajikistan) Rustamov Asadullo	Decision (Unanimous)	3	5:00	
Kickboxing 30 kg	(China) Zhang Xiongliang	def.	(China) Zhang Chao	Decision (Unanimous)	2	2:00	KLF Future Star
Kickboxing 75 kg	(China) Chang Juncheng	def.	(China) Chu Shihao	TKO (Punches)	2	1:20	
Kickboxing 70 kg	(China) Lu Jiahui	def.	(China) Li Shuai	KO (Spinning Back Kick)	1	0:31	
Kickboxing 65 kg	(China) Ran Junhua	def.	(China) Hu Erkang	Decision (Unanimous)	3	3:00	
Kickboxing 63 kg	(China) Feng Tianhao	def.	(China) Chen Xiaofan	Decision (Unanimous)	3	3:00	
Kickboxing 60 kg	(China) Gao Zilong	def.	(China) Zhu Chang	Decision (Majority)	3	3:00	
Kickboxing 52.5 kg	(China) Gu Jiayi	def.	(China) Sun Yiqiu	TKO (Punches)	2	1:07	Female Bout

== Kunlun Fight 87 ==
Kunlun Fight 87
- Promotion: Kunlun Fight
- Date: October 4, 2019
- City: Tongliao, Inner Mongolia, China

Event chronology
Kunlun Fight 86	Kunlun Fight 87	Kunlun Fight 88

Kunlun Fight 87 was a kickboxing event held by Kunlun Fight on October 4, 2019 in Tongliao, Inner Mongolia, China.

=== Results ===
Kunlun Fight 87
Weight Class				Method	Round	Time	Notes
Kickboxing 85 kg	(China) Zheng Zhaoyu	def.	(Rwanda) Sosthene Umucunguzi	TKO (Retirement)	1	1:51	
Kickboxing 52.5 kg	(China) Kuang Fei	def.	(Iran) Shima Pezeshkiaghadam	Decision (Unanimous)	3	2:00	Female Bout
MMA 63 kg	(Tajikistan) Akhmedov Umedjon	def.	(China) Tuerdibieke	Submission (Rear-Naked Choke)	1	2:49	
Kickboxing 70 kg	(China) Guo Wentao	-	(China) Zhang Lin	Draw (Majority)	3	3:00	
Kickboxing 65 kg	(China) Bian Mengchao	def.	(China) Lv Jie	KO (Punch to the Body)	3	0:35	
Kickboxing 63 kg	(China) Fang Kejin	def.	(China) Tong Kelei	Decision (Majority)	3	3:00	
Kickboxing 60 kg	(China) Ma Le	def.	(China) Liu Xiyuan	TKO (Referee Stoppage)	1	0:18	
Kickboxing 52.5 kg	(China) Sun Luyao	def.	(Brazil) Bruna Francischini	TKO (Arm Injury)	1	2:00	Female Bout
Kickboxing 46 kg	(China) Huang Ziqi	def.	(China) Zhang Junjie	Decision (Unanimous)	2	2:00	KLF Future Star

== Kunlun Fight 88 ==
Kunlun Fight 88
- Promotion: Kunlun Fight
- Date: December 25, 2019
- Venue: Yiwu International Expo Center
- City: Yiwu, China

Event chronology
Kunlun Fight 87	Kunlun Fight 88	Kunlun Fight 89

Kunlun Fight 88 was a kickboxing event held by Kunlun Fight on December 25, 2019 at Yiwu International Expo Center in Yiwu, China.

=== Background ===
This event featured a 4-man 30-kilogram Tournaments to earn the 2019 KLF Future Star 30 kg Championship.

==== 2019 KLF Future Star 30 kg Championship Tournament bracket ====
Semifinals
(China) Liu Ziyuan	TKO
(China) Yang Guotao	3r.
(China) Shi Zhe	UD
(China) Zhang Xiongliang	3r.

Final
(China) Liu Ziyuan	UD
(China) Shi Zhe	3r.

=== Results ===
Kunlun Fight 88
Weight Class				Method	Round	Time	Notes
Kickboxing 71 kg	(Belarus) Dzianis Zuev	def.	(China) Zhao Junchen	Ext.R Decision (Unanimous)	4	3:00	
Kickboxing 30 kg	(China) Liu Ziyuan	def.	(China) Shi Zhe	Decision (Unanimous)	3	2:00	2019 KLF Future Star 30 kg Championship Tournament Final
Kickboxing 61.5 kg	(Iran) Ahmad Nikkarchenijani	def.	(Thailand) Johny	Decision (Majority)	3	3:00	
Kickboxing 60 kg	(China) Chen Jiayi	def.	(Iran) Amir Najafi	TKO (Knees)	2	1:35	
Kickboxing 51 kg	(China) Zhang Peimian	def.	(China) Yang Wei	Decision (Unanimous)	3	3:00	
Kickboxing 30 kg	(China) Shi Zhe	def.	(China) Zhang Xiongliang	Decision (Unanimous)	3	2:00	2019 KLF Future Star 30 kg Championship Tournament Semi-Finals B
Kickboxing 30 kg	(China) Liu Ziyuan	def.	(China) Yang Guotao	TKO (Referee Stoppage)	3	1:08	2019 KLF Future Star 30 kg Championship Tournament Semi-Finals A
Kickboxing 67 kg	(China) Sun Yaowei	def.	(Russia) Maksin Shen	TKO (Knee and Punches)	1	1:18	
Kickboxing 58 kg	(China) Sun Haifeng	def.	(China) Qin Hao	Decision (Unanimous)	3	2:00	Amateur Bout

== See also ==
- List of Kunlun Fight events
- 2019 in Glory
- 2019 in K-1
- 2019 in ONE Championship
- 2019 in Romanian kickboxing
