= Ilias Ennahachi =

Dutch-Moroccan kickboxer

- Born: 15 May 1996 (age 30); Utrecht, Netherlands
- Other names: Tweety
- Nationality: Moroccan; Dutch
- Height: 178 cm (5 ft 10 in)
- Weight: 61.2 kg (135 lb) (2014-2021); 65 kg (143 lb) (2023–present)
- Division: Flyweight; Bantamweight
- Style: Kickboxing
- Stance: Orthodox
- Fighting out of: Utrecht, Netherlands
- Team: SB Gym

Kickboxing record
- Total: 44
- Wins: 40
- By knockout: 8
- Losses: 3
- By knockout: 2
- No contests: 1

Ilias Ennahachi (born May 15, 1996) is a Moroccan-Dutch kickboxer. He is the former ONE Kickboxing Flyweight World Champion, having won the title on August 16, 2019, until he vacated his title on January 3, 2023, due to hydration issues, the former Enfusion 60 kg champion, and the former BLADE 61 kg champion.

As of November 2021, Combat Press ranks him as the #4 bantamweight in the world. Combat Press ranked him as the #2 super bantamweight between September 2020 and July 2021. He was previously ranked in the bantamweight top ten by Combat Press from May 2019 until August 2020.

== Early life ==
Ennahachi was born and raised in the Netherlands by parents who were originally from Morocco. His dad and uncle practiced karate, and his cousins practiced kickboxing. At his father's urging, Ennahachi started training in kickboxing at age 11 and had his first match two months later.

== Kickboxing career ==
=== Early career ===
Ennahachi was scheduled to fight Ali Zoubai for the Enfusion -60 kg title in May 2016. Ennahachi won the bout by unanimous decision. Ennahachi defended his title five months later, during Enfusion Live 42, against Cristofer Opazos. He won by a first-round TKO.

He challenged Hikaru Machida for the BLADE 61 kg title during Rebels 47. Ennahachi defeated Machida by unanimous decision.

Following his successful title bid, Ennahachi fought twice in China. He lost to Zhao Chongyang by KO, after only 32 seconds, and lost a decision to Wang Wenfeng.

He defended his Enfusion title for the second time with a TKO win over Krobsut Fairtex.

Ennahachi participated in the 2018 WFL 63 kg tournament. Ennahachi knocked Cătălin Eduard out with a head kick in the semifinals, and won a decision against Issam Laazibi in the finals.

Ennahachi defended his Enfusion title for the third time with a second-round TKO win over Madani Belhaddad at Enfusion 82.

=== ONE Championship ===
==== ONE Flyweight Kickboxing champion ====
In June 2019, Ennahachi signed a two-year contract with ONE Championship. After signing with ONE, he was immediately granted a title shot against Petchdam Petchyindee Academy for the ONE Flyweight Kickboxing World Championship. On August 16, 2019, Ennahachi knocked Petchdam out in the third round at ONE Championship: Dreams of Gold.

On November 21, 2019, he defended his title against Wang Wenfeng at ONE Championship: Age Of Dragons. Ennahachi won in a split decision.

Ennahachi defend his title against Superlek Kiatmuu9 at ONE Championship: Fists Of Fury on February 26, 2021. Ennahachi won by a controversial unanimous decision.

Ennahachi defended his title against Superlek in an immediate rematch after the controversial nature of his win. The rematch between Ennahachi and Superlek was scheduled on January 14, 2023, at ONE on Prime Video 6. Ennahachi pulled out due to his inability to make the flyweight limit of 135 pounds while hydrated and decided to vacated the title. Superlek was rescheduled to face Daniel Puertas for the vacant championship.

==== Move to bantamweight ====
Ennahachi faced Aliasghar Ghodratisaraskan at ONE Friday Fights 6 on February 24, 2023. He won the fight by a second-round knockout.

Ennahachi faced Hiroki Akimoto on September 27, 2024, at ONE Friday Fights 81. He won the fight via unanimous decision.

Ennahachi was scheduled to face Petchtanong Petchfergus on February 20, 2025, at ONE 171. The fight was later cancelled after Ennahachi missed weight by over 5 pounds, and was deemed medically unfit to fight.

== Titles ==
- ONE Championship
  - ONE Flyweight Kickboxing World Champion (former, two title defenses)
- World Fighting League
  - 2018 World Fighting League -63 kg Champion
- BLADE
  - 2016 BLADE -61 kg Champion
- Enfusion
  - 2016 Enfusion -60 kg Champion (three title defenses)

== Professional kickboxing record ==
Professional kickboxing record
40 wins (8 (T)KOs), 3 losses, 0 draws, 1 no contest
Date	Result	Opponent	Event	Location	Method	Round	Time
2025-09-26	NC	(Thailand) Nabil Anane	ONE Friday Fights 126, Lumpinee Stadium	Bangkok, Thailand	No contest (low blow)	3	0:23
2024-09-27	Win	(Japan) Hiroki Akimoto	ONE Friday Fights 81	Bangkok, Thailand	Decision (unanimous)	3	3:00
2024-06-02	Win	(Pakistan) Khyzer Hayat	Fight 2 One	Tenerife, Spain	Decision	3	3:00
2023-02-24	Win	(Iran) Aliasghar Ghodratisaraskan	ONE Friday Fights 6, Lumpinee Stadium	Bangkok, Thailand	KO (left hook)	2	1:20
2021-02-26	Win	(Thailand) Superlek Kiatmuu9	ONE Championship: Fists Of Fury	Kallang, Singapore	Decision (unanimous)	5	3:00
Defended the ONE Flyweight Kickboxing World Championship.
2019-11-21	Win	(China) Wang Wenfeng	ONE Championship: Age Of Dragons	Beijing, China	Decision (split)	5	3:00
Defended the ONE Flyweight Kickboxing World Championship.
2019-08-16	Win	(Thailand) Petchdam Petchyindee Academy	ONE Championship: Dreams of Gold	Bangkok, Thailand	KO (left hook)	3	1:00
Wins the ONE Flyweight Kickboxing World Championship.
2019-04-13	Win	(France) Madani Belhaddad	Enfusion Live 82	France	TKO	2	
Defends the Enfusion -60kg title.
2018-11-24	Win	(Turkey) Enez Ilgin	Night of the Generation	Netherlands	KO (low kick)	1	
2018-10-21	Win	(Morocco) Issam Laazibi	World Fighting League, Final	Netherlands	Decision	3	3:00
Wins the WFL -63kg title.
2018-10-21	Win	(Romania) Eduard Cătălin	World Fighting League, Semi Final	Netherlands	KO (high kick)	1	
2018-03-09	Win	(Thailand) Krobsut Fairtex	Enfusion Live 63	Abu Dhabi	TKO (punches)	1	1:34
Defends the Enfusion -60kg Title.
2017-11-05	Loss	(China) Wang Wenfeng	Kunlun Fight 66 - 61.5 kg 8 Man Tournament, Quarter Finals	Wuhan, China	Decision	3	3:00
2017-04-08	Loss	(China) Zhao Chongyang	Wu Lin Feng	Henan, China	KO (right cross)	1	0:32
2016-11-30	Win	(Japan) Hikaru Machida	Rebels.47	Tokyo, Japan	Decision (unanimous)	3	3:00
Wins the BLADE -61kg Title.
2016-10-08	Win	(Spain) Cristofer Opazos	Enfusion Live 42	Madrid, Spain	TKO (punches)	1	
Defends the Enfusion -60kg Title.
2016-05-14	Win	(Morocco) Ali Zoubai	Fighting Rookies	Nijmegen, Netherlands	Decision	3	3:00
Wins the Enfusion -60kg Title.
2016-01-23	Win	(Morocco) Ilias El Hajoui	Sportmani Events VIII	Amsterdam, Netherlands	TKO (high kick)	3	
2015-02-07	Win	(Netherlands) Tommy Dieckmann	Enfusion Talents	Eindhoven, Netherlands	Decision	3	3:00
2014-11-09	Loss	(Japan) Yosuke Morii	KICKBOXING ZONE	Japan	KO (left hook)	1	2:40
2014-09-28	Win	(China) Wang Wenfeng	Wu Lin Feng - Mejiro Gym	Zaandam, Netherlands	Decision	4	3:00
2014-03-17	Win	(Morocco) Imounachen	Fight For Victory V	Netherlands	KO (head kick)	1	
Legend: Win Loss Draw/no contest Notes

== See also ==
- List of male kickboxers
- List of ONE Championship champions
