= 2018 in Kunlun Fight =

Information
- First date: February 4

The year 2018 was the 5th year in the history of the Kunlun Fight, a kickboxing promotion based in China. 2018 started with Kunlun Fight 69.

The events were broadcasts through television agreements in mainland China with Jiangsu TV and around the world with various other channels. The events were also streamed live on the Kunlun Fight app and multiple other services. Traditionally, most Kunlun Fight events have both tournament fights and superfights (single fights).

== 2018 KLF Tournament Champions ==
Weight Class	Champion	Runner-up	Event	Date	Tournament Bracket
KLF 61.5 kg World Championship Tournament	(China) Wang Wenfeng	(China) Lin Qiangbang	Kunlun Fight 74	May 13, 2018	KLF 61.5 kg World Championship Tournament bracket
KLF 60 kg Mulan Legend World Championship Tournament	(China) Wang Cong	(China) Zhu Mengjia	Kunlun Fight 76	September 9, 2018	KLF 60 kg Mulan Legend World Championship Tournament bracket
KLF 75 kg World Championship Tournament	(Kazakhstan) Mergen Bilyalov	(China) Zhang Yang	Kunlun Fight 78	October 22, 2018	KLF 75 kg World Championship Tournament bracket
KLF 66 kg World Championship Tournament	(Ukraine) Sergey Kulyaba	(China) Gu Hui	Kunlun Fight 79	December 15, 2018	KLF 66 kg World Championship Tournament bracket
KLF 70 kg World Championship Tournament	(Georgia (country)) Davit Kiria	(Morocco) Marouan Toutouh	Kunlun Fight 80	February 24, 2019	KLF 70 kg World Championship Tournament bracket

== Events lists ==
=== List of Kunlun Fight events ===
#	Date	Event	Venue	Location
99	December 15, 2018	Kunlun Fight 79	Shanxi Sports Center Gymnasium	Taiyuan, China
98	November 19, 2018	Kunlun Fight Elite Fight Night 3	Kunlun Fight Stadium	Tongling, Anhui, China
97	November 6, 2018	Kunlun Fight Elite Fight Night 2	Kunlun Fight Stadium	Tongling, Anhui, China
96	November 5, 2018	Kunlun Fight Elite Fight Night 1	Kunlun Fight Stadium	Tongling, Anhui, China
95	October 22, 2018	Kunlun Fight 78	Kunlun Fight Stadium	Tongling, Anhui, China
94	October 14, 2018	Kunlun Fight 77	Kunlun Fight Stadium	Tongling, Anhui, China
93	September 9, 2018	Kunlun Fight 76	Shandong University of Finance & Economics Stadium	Zhangqiu, China
92	August 5, 2018	Kunlun Fight 75	Mangrove Tree International Conference Center	Sanya, Hainan, China
91	June 1, 2018	Kunlun Fight Macao	Macao Arena	Macau, SAR, China
90	May 26, 2018	Kunlun Fight World Tour: Russia	Platinum Arena	Khabarovsk, Russia
89	May 13, 2018	Kunlun Fight 74	Jinan Zhangqiu Stadium	Zhangqiu, China
88	May 6, 2018	Kunlun Fight 73	Mangrove Tree International Conference Center	Sanya, Hainan, China
87	April 15, 2018	Kunlun Fight 72	Kunlun Fight World Combat Sports Center	Beijing, China
86	April 1, 2018	Kunlun Fight 71	Mangrove Tree Resort	Qingdao, China
85	March 11, 2018	Kunlun Fight 70	Mangrove Tree International Conference Center	Sanya, Hainan, China
84	February 4, 2018	Kunlun Fight 69	Guanshan Lake International Conference Center	Guiyang, China

=== List of Kunlun Combat Professional League events ===
#	Date	Event	Venue	Location
71	December 31, 2018	Kunlun Combat League - Changzhou vs. Kunshan	Kunlun Fight Stadium	Tongling, Anhui, China
70	December 29, 2018	Kunlun Combat League - Hefei vs. Wuhan	Kunlun Fight Stadium	Tongling, Anhui, China
69	December 28, 2018	Kunlun Combat League - Longyan vs. Qingdao	Kunlun Fight Stadium	Tongling, Anhui, China
68	December 27, 2018	Kunlun Combat League - Wenzhou vs. Dongguan	Kunlun Fight Stadium	Tongling, Anhui, China
67	December 26, 2018	Kunlun Combat League - Changsha vs. Guiyang	Kunlun Fight Stadium	Tongling, Anhui, China
66	December 23, 2018	Kunlun Combat League - Xuzhou vs. Yichang	Kunlun Fight Stadium	Tongling, Anhui, China
65	December 22, 2018	Kunlun Combat League - Beijing vs.Beijing	Kunlun Fight Stadium	Tongling, Anhui, China
64	December 21, 2018	Kunlun Combat League - Huizhou vs. Sanmenxia	Kunlun Fight Stadium	Tongling, Anhui, China
63	December 20, 2018	Kunlun Combat League - Shanghai vs. Chengdu	Kunlun Fight Stadium	Tongling, Anhui, China
62	December 19, 2018	Kunlun Combat League - Dalian vs. Tianjin	Kunlun Fight Stadium	Tongling, Anhui, China
61	December 8, 2018	Kunlun Combat League - Qingdao vs. Jinan	Kunlun Fight Stadium	Tongling, Anhui, China
60	December 7, 2018	Kunlun Combat League - Wuhan vs. Guangzhou	Kunlun Fight Stadium	Tongling, Anhui, China
59	December 6, 2018	Kunlun Combat League - Kunshan vs. Zhengzhou	Kunlun Fight Stadium	Tongling, Anhui, China
58	December 5, 2018	Kunlun Combat League - Guiyang vs. Dongguan	Kunlun Fight Stadium	Tongling, Anhui, China
57	December 2, 2018	Kunlun Combat League - Chengdu vs. Shenzhen	Kunlun Fight Stadium	Tongling, Anhui, China
56	December 1, 2018	Kunlun Combat League - Xuancheng vs. Tianjin	Kunlun Fight Stadium	Tongling, Anhui, China
55	November 30, 2018	Kunlun Combat League - Beijing vs. Yichang	Kunlun Fight Stadium	Tongling, Anhui, China
54	November 29, 2018	Kunlun Combat League - Sanmenxia vs. Taiyuan	Kunlun Fight Stadium	Tongling, Anhui, China
53	November 28, 2018	Kunlun Combat League - Wuhan vs. Qingdao	Kunlun Fight Stadium	Tongling, Anhui, China
52	November 25, 2018	Kunlun Combat League - Guangzhou vs. Jinan	Kunlun Fight Stadium	Tongling, Anhui, China
51	November 24, 2018	Kunlun Combat League - Kunshan vs. Dongguan	Kunlun Fight Stadium	Tongling, Anhui, China
50	November 23, 2018	Kunlun Combat League - Guiyang vs. Zhengzhou	Kunlun Fight Stadium	Tongling, Anhui, China
49	November 22, 2018	Kunlun Combat League - Chengdu vs. Tianjin	Kunlun Fight Stadium	Tongling, Anhui, China
48	November 21, 2018	Kunlun Combat League - Xuancheng vs. Shenzhen	Kunlun Fight Stadium	Tongling, Anhui, China
47	November 18, 2018	Kunlun Combat League - Beijing vs. Taiyuan	Kunlun Fight Stadium	Tongling, Anhui, China
46	November 17, 2018	Kunlun Combat League - Sanmenxia vs. Yichang	Kunlun Fight Stadium	Tongling, Anhui, China
45	November 16, 2018	Kunlun Combat League - Qingdao vs. Zhengzhou	Kunlun Fight Stadium	Tongling, Anhui, China
44	November 15, 2018	Kunlun Combat League - Guangzhou vs. Dongguan	Kunlun Fight Stadium	Tongling, Anhui, China
43	November 14, 2018	Kunlun Combat League - Kunshan vs. Jinan	Kunlun Fight Stadium	Tongling, Anhui, China
42	November 11, 2018	Kunlun Combat League - Wuhan vs. Guiyang	Kunlun Fight Stadium	Tongling, Anhui, China
41	November 10, 2018	Kunlun Combat League - Chengdu vs. Yichang	Kunlun Fight Stadium	Tongling, Anhui, China
40	November 9, 2018	Kunlun Combat League - Xuancheng vs. Taiyuan	Kunlun Fight Stadium	Tongling, Anhui, China
39	November 8, 2018	Kunlun Combat League - Beijing vs. Shenzhen	Kunlun Fight Stadium	Tongling, Anhui, China
38	November 7, 2018	Kunlun Combat League - Sanmenxia vs. Tianjin	Kunlun Fight Stadium	Tongling, Anhui, China
37	November 4, 2018	Kunlun Combat League - Qingdao vs. Dongguan	Kunlun Fight Stadium	Tongling, Anhui, China
36	November 3, 2018	Kunlun Combat League - Guangzhou vs. Zhengzhou	Kunlun Fight Stadium	Tongling, Anhui, China
35	November 2, 2018	Kunlun Combat League - Wuhan vs. Kunshan	Kunlun Fight Stadium	Tongling, Anhui, China
34	November 1, 2018	Kunlun Combat League - Guiyang vs. Jinan	Kunlun Fight Stadium	Tongling, Anhui, China
33	October 31, 2018	Kunlun Combat League - Chengdu vs. Taiyuan	Kunlun Fight Stadium	Tongling, Anhui, China
32	October 30, 2018	Kunlun Combat League	Kunlun Fight Stadium	Tongling, Anhui, China
31	October 29, 2018	Kunlun Combat League - Guangzhou vs. Kunshan	Kunlun Fight Stadium	Tongling, Anhui, China
30	October 28, 2018	Kunlun Combat League - Yichang vs. Xuancheng	Kunlun Fight Stadium	Tongling, Anhui, China
29	October 27, 2018	Kunlun Combat League - Beijing vs. Tianjin	Kunlun Fight Stadium	Tongling, Anhui, China
28	October 26, 2018	Kunlun Combat League - Sanmenxia vs. Shenzhen	Kunlun Fight Stadium	Tongling, Anhui, China
27	October 25, 2018	Kunlun Combat League - Zhengzhou vs. Wuhan	Kunlun Fight Stadium	Tongling, Anhui, China
26	October 24, 2018	Kunlun Combat League - Jinan vs. Dongguan	Kunlun Fight Stadium	Tongling, Anhui, China
25	October 20, 2018	Kunlun Combat League - Guiyang vs. Qingdao	Kunlun Fight Stadium	Tongling, Anhui, China
24	October 19, 2018	Kunlun Combat League - Tianjin vs. Yichang	Kunlun Fight Stadium	Tongling, Anhui, China
23	October 19, 2018	Kunlun Combat League		China
22	October 18, 2018	Kunlun Combat League - Shenzhen vs. Taiyuan	Kunlun Fight Stadium	Tongling, Anhui, China
21	October 17, 2018	Kunlun Combat League - Xuancheng vs. Beijing	Kunlun Fight Stadium	Tongling, Anhui, China
20	October 16, 2018	Kunlun Combat League - Sanmenxiavs. Chengdu	Kunlun Fight Stadium	Tongling, Anhui, China
19	October 15, 2018	Kunlun Combat League - Wuhan vs. Dongguan	Kunlun Fight Stadium	Tongling, Anhui, China
18	October 12, 2018	Kunlun Combat League - Jinan vs. Zhengzhou	Kunlun Fight Stadium	Tongling, Anhui, China
17	October 11, 2018	Kunlun Combat League - Kunshan vs. Qingdao	Kunlun Fight Stadium	Tongling, Anhui, China
16	October 10, 2018	Kunlun Combat League - Guiyang vs. Guangzhou	Kunlun Fight Stadium	Tongling, Anhui, China
15	October 9, 2018	Kunlun Combat League	Kunlun Fight Stadium	Tongling, Anhui, China
14	October 7, 2018	Kunlun Combat League - Tianjin vs. Taiyuan	Kunlun Fight Stadium	Tongling, Anhui, China
13	October 6, 2018	Kunlun Combat League - Shenzhen vs. Yichang	Kunlun Fight Stadium	Tongling, Anhui, China
12	October 5, 2018	Kunlun Combat League - Chengdu vs. Beijing	Kunlun Fight Stadium	Tongling, Anhui, China
11	October 4, 2018	Kunlun Combat League - Sanmenxia vs. Xuancheng	Kunlun Fight Stadium	Tongling, Anhui, China
10	October 3, 2018	Kunlun Combat League - Zhengzhou vs. Dongguan	Kunlun Fight Stadium	Tongling, Anhui, China
9	October 2, 2018	Kunlun Combat League	Kunlun Fight Stadium	Tongling, Anhui, China
8	September 30, 2018	Kunlun Combat League - Jinan vs. Wuhan	Kunlun Fight Stadium	Tongling, Anhui, China
7	September 29, 2018	Kunlun Combat League - Guangzhou vs. Qingdao	Kunlun Fight Stadium	Tongling, Anhui, China
6	September 28, 2018	Kunlun Combat League - Guiyang vs. Kunshan	Kunlun Fight Stadium	Tongling, Anhui, China
5	September 27, 2018	Kunlun Combat League - Yichang vs. Taiyuan	Kunlun Fight Stadium	Tongling, Anhui, China
4	September 26, 2018	Kunlun Combat League - Shenzhen vs. Tianjin	Kunlun Fight Stadium	Tongling, Anhui, China
3	September 25, 2018	Kunlun Combat League	Kunlun Fight Stadium	Tongling, Anhui, China
2	September 23, 2018	Kunlun Combat League - Xuancheng vs. Chengdu	Kunlun Fight Stadium	Tongling, Anhui, China
1	September 22, 2018	Kunlun Combat League - Beijing vs. Sanmenxia	Kunlun Fight Stadium	Tongling, Anhui, China

=== List of Road to Kunlun events ===
#	Date	Event	Venue	Location
19	July 1, 2018	Road to Kunlun 19		Shenyang, China
18	June 9, 2018	Road to Kunlun 18		Jining, China
17	February 14, 2018	Road to Kunlun 17		Fushun, China

== Kunlun Fight 69 ==
Kunlun Fight 69
- The poster for Kunlun Fight 69
- Promotion: Kunlun Fight
- Date: February 4, 2018
- Venue: Guanshan Lake International Conference Center
- City: Guiyang, China

Event chronology
Kunlun Fight 68	Kunlun Fight 69	Kunlun Fight 70

Kunlun Fight 69 was a kickboxing event held by Kunlun Fight on February 4, 2018, at the Guanshan Lake International Conference Center in Guiyang, China.

=== Background ===
This event had the 4-man finals for both the 70 kg and 100+kg tournaments that were held throughout 2017. Featured on the card were also Kunlun Fight 75 kg champion Vitaly Gurkov and Buakaw Banchamek.

==== 2017 KLF 70 kg World Championship Tournament bracket ====
Final 16; Kunlun Fight 65
(Thailand) Jomthong Chuwattana	R3
(Armenia) Marat Grigorian	KO
(Morocco) Mohamed Mezouari	TKO
(Russia) Artem Pashporin	R1
(France) Yohann Drai	DEC
(China) Zhang Dezheng
(Belarus) Dzianis Zuev	TKO
(China) Feng Xingli
(Ukraine) Sergey Kulyaba	DEC
(Belarus) Andrei Kulebin	R3
(Serbia) Nikola Cimesa	DEC
(China) Tian Xin	R3
(Netherlands) Marouan Toutouh	R3
(Georgia (country)) Davit Kiria	DEC
(Thailand) Superbon Banchamek	DEC
(Democratic Republic of the Congo) Nayanesh Ayman	R3

Quarterfinals; Kunlun Fight 67
(Armenia) Marat Grigorian	DEC
(Morocco) Mohamed Mezouari	R3
(France) Yohann Drai	R3
(Belarus) Dzianis Zuev	DEC
(Ukraine) Sergey Kulyaba	DEC
(Serbia) Nikola Cimesa	R3
(Georgia (country)) Davit Kiria	R3
(Thailand) Superbon Banchamek	DEC

Semifinals
(Armenia) Marat Grigorian	DEC
(Belarus) Dzianis Zuev	R3
(Ukraine) Sergey Kulyaba	R3
(Thailand) Superbon Banchamek	DEC

Final
(Armenia) Marat Grigorian	KO
(Thailand) Superbon Banchamek	R1

=== Results ===
Kunlun Fight 69
Weight Class				Method	Round	Time	Notes
MMA 57 kg	(China) Meixuan Zhang	def.	(Japan) Magisa	KO (Elbows and Punches)	1	3:20	
Kickboxing 100+ kg	(Iran) Iraj Azizpour	def.	(Ukraine) Roman Kryklia	Ext.R Decision (Majority)	4	3:00	2017 KLF 100+ kg World Championship Tournament Final
MMA 77 kg	(China) Zhang Lipeng	def.	(Brazil) Ítalo Gonçalves	TKO (Elbows)	2	2:33	
Kickboxing 75 kg	(China) Zhang Yang	def.	(Belarus) Vitaly Gurkov	Ext.R Decision (Unanimous)	4	3:00	
Kickboxing 70 kg	(Thailand) Buakaw Banchamek	def.	(Democratic Republic of the Congo) Nayanesh Ayman	KO (Punch)	1	2:04	
Kickboxing 100+ kg	(Ukraine) Roman Kryklia	def.	(Brazil) Felipe Micheletti	Decision (Unanimous)	3	3:00	2017 KLF 100+ kg World Championship Tournament Semi-Finals
Kickboxing 100+ kg	(Iran) Iraj Azizpour	def.	(China) Asihati	KO (Head Kick)	2	3:00	2017 KLF 100+ kg World Championship Tournament Semi-Finals
Kickboxing 70 kg	(Armenia) Marat Grigorian	def.	(Thailand) Superbon Banchamek	KO (Punches)	1	0:28	2017 KLF 70 kg World Championship Tournament Final
Kickboxing 67 kg	(Belarus) Andrei Kulebin	def.	(China) Gu Hui	Decision (Unanimous)	3	3:00	
Kickboxing 70 kg	(Thailand) Superbon Banchamek	def.	(Ukraine) Sergey Kulyaba	Decision (Majority)	3	3:00	2017 KLF 70 kg World Championship Tournament Semi-Finals
Kickboxing 70 kg	(Armenia) Marat Grigorian	def.	(Belarus) Dzianis Zuev	Decision (Unanimous)	3	3:00	2017 KLF 70 kg World Championship Tournament Semi-Finals
Kickboxing 70 kg	(China) Kong Lingfeng	def.	(Japan) Takuya Imamura	Decision (Unanimous)	3	3:00	2017 KLF 70 kg World Championship Tournament Reserve Fight
MMA 66 kg	(New Zealand) Mark Abelardo	def.	(China) Yan Xibo	TKO (Elbows and Punches)	1	3:20	
Kickboxing 100+ kg	(Russia) Beybulat Isaev	def.	(China) Wu Chao	KO (Punch)	1	2:41	2017 KLF 100+ kg World Championship Tournament Reserve Fight

== Kunlun Fight 70 ==
Kunlun Fight 70
- The poster for Kunlun Fight 70
- Promotion: Kunlun Fight
- Date: March 11, 2018
- Venue: Mangrove Tree International Conference Center
- City: Sanya, Hainan, China

Event chronology
Kunlun Fight 69	Kunlun Fight 70	Kunlun Fight 71

Kunlun Fight 70 was a kickboxing event held by Kunlun Fight on March 11, 2018, at the Mangrove Tree International Conference Center in Sanya, Hainan, China.

=== Background ===
This event featured two 4-Man 70-kilogram qualifying Tournaments to earn a spot in 2018 KLF 70 kg World Championship Tournament.

==== 2018 KLF 70 kg World championship Qualifying bracket 1 ====
Semifinals
(Japan) Shintaro Matsukura	3r.
(China) Hu Yafei	MD
(Spain) Elam Chavez	3r.
(Australia) Victor Nagbe	UD

Final
(China) Hu Yafei	3r.
(Australia) Victor Nagbe	TKO

==== 2018 KLF 70 kg World championship Qualifying bracket 2 ====
Semi-finals
(Czech Republic) Michael Krčmář	3r.
(China) Feng Xingli	MD
(Serbia) Nikola Cimesa	4r.
(France) Yohann Drai	SD

Final
(China) Feng Xingli	3r.
(France) Yohann Drai	MD

=== Results ===
Kunlun Fight 70
Weight Class				Method	Round	Time	Notes
Kickboxing 70 kg	(France) Yohann Drai	def.	(China) Feng Xingli	Decision (Majority)	3	3:00	2018 KLF 70 kg World Championship Qualifying Tournament 2 Final
Kickboxing 66 kg	(China) Wei Ninghui	-	(Brazil) Jordan Kranio	Ext.R Draw (Majority)	4	3:00	
Kickboxing 61.5 kg	(China) Wang Wenfeng	def.	(Georgia (country)) Giorgi Khupenia	Decision (Unanimous)	3	3:00	
MMA 70 kg	(Russia) Bagautdin Abasov	def.	(China) Hasiter	KO (Punches)	1	1:22	
Kickboxing 66 kg	(Japan) Kenta Yamada	def.	(China) Feng Lei	Decision (Split)	3	3:00	
Kickboxing 70 kg	(France) Yohann Drai	def.	(Serbia) Nikola Cimesa	Ext.R Decision (Split)	4	3:00	2018 KLF 70 kg World Championship Qualifying Tournament 2 Semi-Finals B
Kickboxing 70 kg	(China) Feng Xingli	def.	(Czech Republic) Michael Krčmář	Decision (Majority)	3	3:00	2018 KLF 70 kg World Championship Qualifying Tournament 2 Semi-Finals A
MMA 65 kg	(New Zealand) Mark Abelardo	def.	(China) Zha Yi	Decision (Unanimous)	3	5:00	
Kickboxing 77 kg	(China) Law Chosing	def.	(Thailand) Sammy Banchamek	TKO (punches)	2	3:00	
Kickboxing 70 kg	(Australia) Victor Nagbe	def.	(China) Hu Yafei	TKO (Leg Kick)	3	1:16	2018 KLF 70 kg World Championship Qualifying Tournament 1 Final
Kickboxing 63 kg	(China) Wang Kehan	def.	(France) Laëtitia Madjene	Decision (Unanimous)	3	3:00	Female Bout
Kickboxing 70 kg	(Australia) Victor Nagbe	def.	(Spain) Elam Chavez	Decision (Unanimous)	3	3:00	2018 KLF 70 kg World Championship Qualifying Tournament 1 Semi-Finals B
Kickboxing 70 kg	(China) Hu Yafei	def.	(Japan) Shintaro Matsukura	Decision (Majority)	3	3:00	2018 KLF 70 kg World Championship Qualifying Tournament 1 Semi-Finals A
Kickboxing 70 kg	(China) Zhu Baotong	dec.	(Iran) Saeid Chahardouli	Decision (Majority)	3	3:00	2018 KLF 70 kg World Championship Qualifying Tournament Reserve Fight

== Kunlun Fight 71 ==
Kunlun Fight 71
- The poster for Kunlun Fight 71
- Promotion: Kunlun Fight
- Date: April 1, 2018
- Venue: Mangrove Tree Convention Center
- City: Qingdao, China

Event chronology
Kunlun Fight 70	Kunlun Fight 71	Kunlun Fight 72

Kunlun Fight 71 was a kickboxing event held by Kunlun Fight on April 1, 2018, at the Mangrove Tree Convention Center in Qingdao, China.

=== Background ===
This event featured two 4-Man 70-kilogram qualifying Tournaments to earn a spot in 2018 KLF 70 kg World Championship Tournament.

==== 2018 KLF 70 kg World championship Qualifying bracket 3 ====
Semifinals
(Morocco) Boum Hammed	3r.
(China) Kong Lingfeng	MD
(Morocco) Nordin Ben Moh	3r.
(Russia) Anatoly Moiseev	UD

Final
(China) Kong Lingfeng	1r.
(Russia) Anatoly Moiseev	TKO

==== 2018 KLF 70 kg World championship Qualifying bracket 4 ====
Semifinals
(Thailand) Noppakow Siriluck	2r.
(Denmark) Niclas Larsen	KO
(China) Tian Xin	KO
(Spain) David Calvo	1r.

Final
(Denmark) Niclas Larsen	UD
(China) Tian Xin	3r.

=== Results ===
Kunlun Fight 71
Weight Class				Method	Round	Time	Notes
Kickboxing 70 kg	(Denmark) Niclas Larsen	def.	(China) Tian Xin	Decision (Unanimous)	3	3:00	2018 KLF 70 kg World Championship Qualifying Tournament 4 Final
Kickboxing 70 kg	(Thailand) Jomthong Chuwattana	def.	(Belarus) Dzianis Zuev	Decision (Split)	3	3:00	
Kickboxing 61.5 kg	(Canada) Denis Purić	def.	(China) Jiao Daobo	Ext.R Decision (Unanimous)	4	3:00	
Kickboxing 70 kg	(China) Tian Xin	def.	(Spain) David Calvo	KO (Punch to the Body)	1	1:04	2018 KLF 70 kg World Championship Qualifying Tournament 4 Semi-Finals B
Kickboxing 70 kg	(Denmark) Niclas Larsen	def.	(Thailand) Noppakow Siriluck	KO (Flying Knee)	2	2:47	2018 KLF 70 kg World Championship Qualifying Tournament 4 Semi-Finals A
Kickboxing 67 kg	(China) Jia Aoqi	def.	(China) Zhang Chunyu	Ext.R Decision (Unanimous)	4	3:00	
MMA 57 kg	(Brazil) Fabrício Andrade	def.	(China) Xiatihe	Submission (Rear-Naked Choke)	2	3:23	
Kickboxing 80 kg	(China) Bo Fufan	def.	(Belarus) Pavel Turuk	Decision (Unanimous)	3	3:00	
Kickboxing 70 kg	(Russia) Anatoly Moiseev	def.	(China) Kong Lingfeng	TKO (Referee Stoppage)	1	2:14	2018 KLF 70 kg World Championship Qualifying Tournament 3 Final
MMA 77 kg	(China) Zhang Lipeng	def.	(Russia) Begautdin Abasov	Submission (Rear-Naked Choke)	2	3:07	
Kickboxing 70 kg	(Russia) Anatoly Moiseev	def.	(Morocco) Nordin Ben Moh	Decision (Unanimous)	3	3:00	2018 KLF 70 kg World Championship Qualifying Tournament 3 Semi-Finals B
Kickboxing 70 kg	(China) Kong Lingfeng	def.	(Morocco) Boum Hammed	Decision (Majority)	3	3:00	2018 KLF 70 kg World Championship Qualifying Tournament 3 Semi-Finals A
Kickboxing 70 kg	(China) Elias Emam Muhammat	def.	(Thailand) Canison Yakasay	Decision (Unanimous)	3	3:00	2018 KLF 70 kg World Championship Qualifying Tournament Reserve Fight
Kickboxing 63 kg	(Madagascar) Razanajatovo Fazaraly	def.	(China) Zhang Jingu	Decision (Unanimous)	3	3:00	
Kickboxing 65 kg	(China) Bao Yudan	def.	(China) Ge Ping	Draw (Unanimous)	3	3:00	Female Rookie Fight

== Kunlun Fight 72 ==
Kunlun Fight 72
- The poster for Kunlun Fight 72
- Promotion: Kunlun Fight
- Date: April 15, 2018
- Venue: Kunlun World Combat Sports Center
- City: Beijing, China

Event chronology
Kunlun Fight 71	Kunlun Fight 72	Kunlun Fight 73

Kunlun Fight 72 was a kickboxing event held by Kunlun Fight on April 15, 2018, at the Kunlun World Combat Sports Center in Beijing, China.

=== Background ===
This event featured two 4-Man 70-kilogram qualifying Tournaments to earn a spot in 2018 KLF 70 kg World Championship Tournament.

==== 2018 KLF 70 kg World championship Qualifying bracket 5 ====
Semifinals
(Japan) Tomoyuki Nishikawa	UD
(China) Wu Xuesong	4r.
(Russia) Vlad Tuinov	UD
(Belgium) Yassin Baitar	3r.

Final
(Japan) Tomoyuki Nishikawa	1r.
(Russia) Vlad Tuinov	KO

==== 2018 KLF 70 kg World championship Qualifying bracket 6 ====
Semifinals
(Slovakia) Milan Pales	TKO
(China) Zhang Dezheng	2r.
(Democratic Republic of the Congo) Nayanesh Ayman	3r.
(Morocco) Marouan Toutouh	UD

Final
(Slovakia) Milan Pales	3r.
(Morocco) Marouan Toutouh	TKO

=== Results ===
Kunlun Fight 72
Weight Class				Method	Round	Time	Notes
Kickboxing 70 kg	(Morocco) Marouan Toutouh	def.	(Slovakia) Milan Pales	TKO (Knees)	3	1:43	2018 KLF 70 kg World Championship Qualifying Tournament 6 Final
Kickboxing 75 kg	(Kazakhstan) Mergen Bilyalov	def.	(China) Zhang Yang	KO (Punch)	1	2:17	
Kickboxing 61.5 kg	(China) Lin Qiangbang	def.	(Russia) Vladimir Litkyn	KO (Punches and Head kicks)	2	0:32	
MMA 57 kg	(China) Bamma Duoji	def.	(Tajikistan) Umidjon Musayev	TKO (Punches)	1	1:14	
Kickboxing 70 kg	(Morocco) Marouan Toutouh	def.	(Democratic Republic of the Congo) Nayanesh Ayman	Decision (Unanimous)	3	3:00	2018 KLF 70 kg World Championship Qualifying Tournament 6 Semi-Finals B
Kickboxing 70 kg	(Slovakia) Milan Pales	def.	(China) Zhang Dezheng	TKO (Punches)	2	0:51	2018 KLF 70 kg World Championship Qualifying Tournament 6 Semi-Finals A
Kickboxing 70 kg	(Russia) Vlad Tuinov	def.	(Japan) Tomoyuki Nishikawa	KO (Punches)	1	2:40	2018 KLF 70 kg World Championship Qualifying Tournament 5 Final
Kickboxing 52.5 kg	(China) Guan Acui	def.	(Italy) Silvia La Notte	Decision (Unanimous)	3	3:00	Female Bout
MMA 57 kg	(Brazil) Hudson Rocha	def.	(China) Wan Jianping	Submission (Guillotine Choke)	1	1:59	
Kickboxing 70 kg	(Russia) Vlad Tuinov	def.	(Belgium) Yassin Baitar	Decision (Unanimous)	3	3:00	2018 KLF 70 kg World Championship Qualifying Tournament 5 Semi-Finals B
Kickboxing 70 kg	(Japan) Tomoyuki Nishikawa	def.	(China) Wu Xuesong	Ext.R Decision (Unanimous)	4	3:00	2018 KLF 70 kg World Championship Qualifying Tournament 5 Semi-Finals A
Kickboxing 70 kg	(China) Zhu Baotong	def.	(Japan) Takafumi Morita	Decision (Unanimous)	3	3:00	2018 KLF 70 kg World Championship Qualifying Tournament Reserve Fight
Kickboxing 66 kg	(Japan) Yuma Matsui	def.	(China) Bai Lishuai	Decision (Unanimous)	3	3:00	
Kickboxing 65 kg	(China) Lio Jie	def.	(Russia) Albert Aratunan	Decision (Unanimous)	3	3:00	

== Kunlun Fight 73 ==
Kunlun Fight 73
- Promotion: Kunlun Fight
- Date: May 6, 2018
- Venue: Mangrove Tree International Conference Center
- City: Sanya, Hainan, China

Event chronology
Kunlun Fight 72	Kunlun Fight 73	Kunlun Fight 74

Kunlun Fight 73 was a kickboxing event held by Kunlun Fight on May 6, 2018, at the Mangrove Tree International Conference Center in Sanya, Hainan, China.

=== Background ===
This event featured a 8-Man 70-kilogram qualifying Tournaments to earn a spot in 2018 KLF 70 kg World Championship Tournament.

==== 2018 KLF 70 kg World championship Qualifying bracket 7 ====
Quarterfinals
(China) Song Shaoqiu	3r.
(China) Liu Yaning	MD
(China) Zhu Baotong	TKO
(China) Lu Xiaohan	2r.
(China) Tian Xin	3r.
(China) Liu Hainan	UD
(China) Feng Xingli	SD
(China) Hu Yafei	3r.

Semifinals
(China) Liu Yaning	KO
(China) Zhu Baotong	2r.
(China) Liu Hainan	1r.
(China) Feng Xingli	KO

Final
(China) Liu Yaning	3r.
(China) Feng Xingli	UD

=== Results ===
Kunlun Fight 73
Weight Class				Method	Round	Time	Notes
Kickboxing 70 kg	(China) Feng Xingli	def.	(China) Liu Yaning	Decision (Unanimous)	3	3:00	2018 KLF 70 kg World Championship Qualifying Tournament Final
Kickboxing 80 kg	(China) Tan Xiaofeng	def.	(Iran) Mohammad Ghorbanpoir	Decision (Majority)	3	3:00	
Kickboxing 70 kg	(China) Feng Xingli	def.	(China) Liu Hainan	KO (knee)	1	2:21	2018 KLF 70 kg World Championship Qualifying Tournament Semi-Finals B
Kickboxing 70 kg	(China) Liu Yaning	def.	(China) Zhu Baotong	KO (Kick to the Body)	2	0:17	2018 KLF 70 kg World Championship Qualifying Tournament Semi-Finals A
Kickboxing 90 kg	(China) Wang Wenzhong	def.	(Slovakia) Miran Fabjan	Decision (Unanimous)	3	3:00	
Kickboxing 66 kg	(China) Wei Ninghui	def.	(Japan) Kenta Yamada	Decision (Split)	3	3:00	
MMA 70 kg	(Russia) Alexander Belikh	def.	(China) Asihati	TKO (Punches)	3	0:47	
Kickboxing 63 kg	(Morocco) Anissa Haddaoui	def.	(Belgium) Anke Van Gestel	Decision (Unanimous)	3	3:00	Female Bout
Kickboxing 64 kg	(China) Sun Zhixiang	def.	(Japan) Ban Yansong	Decision (Unanimous)	3	3:00	
Kickboxing 70 kg	(China) Feng Xingli	def.	(China) Hu Yafei	Decision (Split)	3	3:00	2018 KLF 70 kg World Championship Qualifying Tournament Quarter-Finals D
Kickboxing 70 kg	(China) Liu Yaning	def.	(China) Song Shaoqiu	Decision (Majority)	3	3:00	2018 KLF 70 kg World Championship Qualifying Tournament Quarter-Finals C
Kickboxing 70 kg	(China) Zhu Baotong	def.	(China) Lu Xiaohan	TKO (Doctor Stoppage)	2	2:06	2018 KLF 70 kg World Championship Qualifying Tournament Quarter-Finals B
Kickboxing 70 kg	(China) Liu Hainan	def.	(China) Tian Xin	Decision (Unanimous)	3	3:00	2018 KLF 70 kg World Championship Qualifying Tournament Quarter-Finals A
Kickboxing 70 kg	(China) Bubigere	def.	(China) Liu Jixin	Decision (Majority)	3	3:00	2018 KLF 70 kg World Championship Qualifying Tournament Reserve Fight

== Kunlun Fight 74 ==
Kunlun Fight 74
- Promotion: Kunlun Fight
- Date: May 13, 2018
- City: Jinan, China

Event chronology
Kunlun Fight 73	Kunlun Fight 74	Kunlun Fight World Tour: Russia

Kunlun Fight 74 was a kickboxing event held by Kunlun Fight on May 13, 2018, in Jinan, China.

=== Background ===
This event featured a 8-Man 61.5-kilogram Tournaments to earn the 2018 KLF 61.5 kg World Championship.

==== 2018 KLF 61.5 kg World Championship Tournament bracket ====
Quarterfinals
(Japan) Taiga Kawabe	3r.
(China) Lin Qiangbang	MD
(China) Zhao Chongyang	MD
(Thailand) Saeksan Or. Kwanmuang	3r.
(China) Jiao Daobo	3r.
(Spain) Daniel Gallardo	MD
(China) Wang Wenfeng	SD
(Romania) Cristian Spetcu	3r.

Semifinals
(China) Lin Qiangbang	KO
(China) Jiang Feng^{1}	1r.
(Spain) Daniel Gallardo	3r.
(China) Wang Wenfeng	UD

Final
(China) Lin Qiangbang	3r.
(China) Wang Wenfeng	UD

^{1}Zhao Chongyang was injured and couldn't participate in the second round of the Grand Prix, and was subsequently replaced by reserve fight winner Jiang Feng.

=== Results ===
Kunlun Fight 74
Weight Class				Method	Round	Time	Notes
Kickboxing 61.5 kg	(China) Wang Wenfeng	def.	(China) Lin Qiangbang	Decision (Unanimous)	3	3:00	2018 KLF 61.5 kg World Championship Tournament Final
Kickboxing 63 kg	(China) Wang Kehan	def.	(France) Aurélie Froment	Decision (Unanimous)	3	3:00	Female Bout
Kickboxing 76 kg	(China) Huang Kai	def.	(Russia) Danil Vinnik	KO (Punches)	1	1:49	
Kickboxing 61.5 kg	(China) Wang Wenfeng	def.	(Spain) Daniel Gallardo	Decision (Unanimous)	3	3:00	2018 KLF 61.5 kg World Championship Tournament Semi-Finals B
Kickboxing 61.5 kg	(China) Lin Qiangbang	def.	(China) Jiang Feng	KO (Punches)	1	1:10	2018 KLF 61.5 kg World Championship Tournament Semi-Finals A
Kickboxing 100+ kg	(China) Asihati	def.	(Latvia) Artur Gorlov	Decision (Majority)	3	3:00	
Kickboxing 85 kg	(Ukraine) Artur Kyshenko	def.	(Russia) Timur Aylyarov	TKO (Punches)	3		
Kickboxing 76 kg	(China) Li Zhuangzhuang	def.	(Netherlands) Albert Kraus	Decision (Split)	3	3:00	
Kickboxing 76 kg	(China) Zheng Zhanoyu	def.	(Brazil) Fernando Nonato	TKO (Punches)	2	1:55	
Kickboxing 80 kg	(Belgium) Jente Nnamadim	def.	(China) Bo Fufan	TKO (Punches)	2	3:00	
Kickboxing 61.5 kg	(China) Wang Wenfeng	def.	(Romania) Cristian Spetcu	Decision (Split)	3	3:00	2018 KLF 61.5 kg World Championship Tournament Quarter-Finals D
Kickboxing 61.5 kg	(Spain) Daniel Gallardo	def.	(China) Jiao Daobo	Decision (Majority)	3	3:00	2018 KLF 61.5 kg World Championship Tournament Quarter-Finals C
Kickboxing 61.5 kg	(China) Zhao Chongyang	def.	(Thailand) Saeksan Or. Kwanmuang	Decision (Majority)	3	3:00	2018 KLF 61.5 kg World Championship Tournament Quarter-Finals B
Kickboxing 61.5 kg	(China) Lin Qiangbang	def.	(Japan) Taiga Kawabe	Decision (Majority)	3	3:00	2018 KLF 61.5 kg World Championship Tournament Quarter-Finals A
Kickboxing 61.5 kg	(China) Jiang Feng	def.	(China) Zhang Jinghu	Decision (Unanimous)	3	3:00	2018 KLF 61.5 kg World Championship Tournament Reserve Fight

== Kunlun Fight World Tour: Russia ==
Kunlun Fight World Tour: Russia
- Promotion: Kunlun Fight; Modern Fighting Pankration
- Date: May 26, 2018
- Venue: Platinum Arena
- City: Khabarovsk, Russia

Event chronology
Kunlun Fight 74	Kunlun Fight World Tour: Russia	Kunlun Fight Macao

Kunlun Fight World Tour: Russia was a Mixed martial arts event held by Kunlun Fight and Modern Fighting Pankration on May 26, 2018, at the Platinum Arena in Khabarovsk, Russia.

=== Results ===
Fight Card
Weight Class				Method	Round	Time	Notes
MMA 70 kg	(Armenia) Arman Tsarukyan	def.	(Brazil) Júnior Assunção	Decision (Unanimous)	3	5:00	MFP Lightweight Championship
MMA 63 kg	(China) Zhenhong Lu	def.	(Russia) Evgeniy Ryazanov	TKO (Cut)	2	3:35	KLF MMA 63 kg Championship
MMA 75 kg	(Russia) Elnur Agaev	def.	(China) Zhang Lipeng	Decision (Split)	3	5:00	
MMA 60 kg	(Russia) Aygul Khabirova	def.	(China) Zhenyao Wang	TKO (Punches)	1	3:02	Female Bout
MMA 66 kg	(Russia) Boris Fedorov	def.	(China) Jumabieke Tuerxun	Decision (Unanimous)	3	5:00	
MMA 66 kg	(China) Musu Nuertiebieke	def.	(Russia) Viktor Danilin	Decision (Unanimous)	3	5:00	
MMA 70 kg	(China) Balajin	def.	(United States) Muhsin Corbbrey	Decision (Unanimous)	3	5:00	
MMA 93 kg	(Russia) Sergey Pogodaev	def.	(China) Mingyang Zhang	TKO (Punches)	2	3:53	
MMA 66 kg	(China) Ye Wen	def.	(Russia) Oktyabrin Yakovlev	Submission (Rear-Naked Choke)	1	4:44	
MMA 77 kg	(Poland) Mateusz Piskorz	def.	(China) Kurbanjiang Tuluosibake	KO (Punches)	1	2:05	
MMA 61 kg	(Russia) Aleksey Indenko	def.	(Canada) Denis Purić	Decision (Unanimous)	3	5:00	

== Kunlun Fight Macao ==
Kunlun Fight Macao
- Promotion: Kunlun Fight
- Date: June 1, 2018
- Venue: Macau Forum
- City: Macau, China

Event chronology
Kunlun Fight World Tour: Russia	Kunlun Fight Macao	Kunlun Fight 75

Kunlun Fight Macao was a kickboxing event held by Kunlun Fight at the Macau Forum on June 1, 2018, in Macau, China.

=== Results ===
Kunlun Fight Macao
Weight Class				Method	Round	Time	Notes
Kickboxing 70 kg	(Thailand) Superbon Banchamek	def.	(Belarus) Dzianis Zuev	Decision (Unanimous)	3	3:00	
Kickboxing 75 kg	(Kazakhstan) Mergen Bilyalov	def.	(China) Huang Kai	Decision (Majority)	3	3:00	
Kickboxing 88 kg	(China) Yang Yu	def.	(Russia) Ishimbaev Ilnar	Decision (Unanimous)	3	3:00	
Muay Thai 70 kg	(Thailand) Chamrat Ketleng	def.	(China) Jiao Zhou	Decision (Unanimous)	3	3:00	
Kickboxing 65 kg	(Thailand) Chaimongkhon Kitsamak	def.	(China) Li Zihao	Decision (Unanimous)	3	3:00	
MMA 66 kg	(China) Yan Xibo	def.	(Philippines) Edison Dondon	Submission (Rear-Naked Choke)	1	4:02	
Kickboxing 83 kg	(Hong Kong) Law Chosing	def.	(Thailand) Tengnueng Sitjaesairoong	Decision (Unanimous)	3	3:00	
Kickboxing 62 kg	(China) Lu Dongqiang	def.	(Brazil) Italo Freitas	Decision (Unanimous)	3	3:00	
Kickboxing 61.5 kg	(China) Lin Qiangbang	def.	(Thailand) Amnat Ruenroeng	Decision (Unanimous)	3	3:00	
Kickboxing 75 kg	(China) Zhang Yang	def.	(Cyprus) Andronikos Evripidou	TKO (Punches)	1	0:28	
Kickboxing 67 kg	(China) Lu Jianbo	def.	(Japan) Eiki	TKO (Punches)	1	2:23	
Kickboxing 66 kg	(China) Sun Zhixiang	def.	(Saudi Arabia) Saranyoo Intharaprasoet	Decision (Unanimous)	3	3:00	
Muay Thai 66 kg	(Macau) Joao Ramos	def.	(Hong Kong) Wang Tingkai	TKO (Leg Kick)	3	0:30	
Kickboxing 70 kg	(China) Bao Daxiang	-	(China) Gao Bo	Draw (Majority)	3	3:00	
Kickboxing 78 kg	(Macau) Cai Feilong	def.	(Hong Kong) Yang	Decision (Unanimous)	3	3:00	

== Kunlun Fight 75 ==
Kunlun Fight 75
- Promotion: Kunlun Fight
- Date: August 5, 2018
- Venue: Mangrove Tree International Conference Center
- City: Sanya, Hainan, China

Event chronology
Kunlun Fight Macao	Kunlun Fight 75	Kunlun Fight 76

Kunlun Fight 75 was a kickboxing event held by Kunlun Fight on August 5, 2018, at the Mangrove Tree International Conference Center in Sanya, Hainan, China.

=== Background ===
This event featured the round of 16 of the 2018 KLF 70-kilogram world championship tournament.

Superbon Banchamek has been forced to withdraw from his scheduled Final 16 bout with Nayanesh Ayman due to an injury. The bout was rescheduled to Kunlun Fight 76. Ayman instead faced Jiao Zhou in a 72 kg bout.

==== 2018 KLF 70 kg World Championship Tournament bracket ====
Final 16
(Russia) Anatoly Moiseev	3r.
(Georgia (country)) Davit Kiria	UD
(Ukraine) Sergey Kulyaba	3r.
(Morocco) Nordin Ben Moh	MD
(Spain) Jonay Risco	UD
(China) Li Shiyuan	3r.
(China) Liu Hainan	3r.
(China) Feng Xingli	MD
(Russia) Vlad Tuinov	UD
(Morocco) Ismail Benali	3r.
(Belarus) Dzianis Zuev	MD
(Australia) Victor Nagbe	3r.
(Denmark) Niclas Larsen	3r.
(Morocco) Marouan Toutouh	UD
(Thailand) Superbon Banchamek	UD
(Democratic Republic of the Congo) Nayanesh Ayman^{1}	3r.

Quarter-Finals; Kunlun Fight 77
(Georgia (country)) Davit Kiria	KO
(Morocco) Nordin Ben Moh	3r.
(Spain) Jonay Risco	3r.
(China) Feng Xingli	MD
(Russia) Vlad Tuinov	3r.
(Belarus) Dzianis Zuev	MD
(Morocco) Marouan Toutouh	UD
(Russia) Anatoly Moiseev^{2}	3r.

Semi-Finals; Kunlun Fight 80
(Georgia (country)) Davit Kiria	KO
(China) Feng Xingli	2r.
(Belarus) Dzianis Zuev	3r.
(Morocco) Marouan Toutouh	MD

Final; Kunlun Fight 80
(Georgia (country)) Davit Kiria	MD
(Morocco) Marouan Toutouh	3r.

^{1}Yohann Drai was injured and couldn't participate in the tournament, and was subsequently replaced by Nayanesh Ayman.

^{2}Superbon Banchamek had to pull out the tournament because of the flu, Russian Anatoly Moiseev stepped in on short notice to square off against Morocco's Marouan Toutouh.

=== Results ===
Kunlun Fight 75
Weight Class				Method	Round	Time	Notes
Kickboxing 70 kg	(China) Feng Xingli	def.	(China) Liu Hainan	Decision (Majority)	3	3:00	2018 KLF 70 kg World Championship Tournament Final 16
Kickboxing 70 kg	(Belarus) Dzianis Zuev	def.	(Australia) Victor Nagbe	Decision (Majority)	3	3:00	2018 KLF 70 kg World Championship Tournament Final 16
Kickboxing 70 kg	(Morocco) Nordin Ben Moh	def.	(Ukraine) Sergey Kulyaba	Decision (Majority)	3	3:00	2018 KLF 70 kg World Championship Tournament Final 16
Kickboxing 70 kg	(Georgia (country)) Davit Kiria	def.	(Russia) Anatoly Moiseev	Decision (Unanimous)	3	3:00	2018 KLF 70 kg World Championship Tournament Final 16
Kickboxing 70 kg	(Spain) Jonay Risco	def.	(China) Li Shiyuan	Decision (Unanimous)	3	3:00	2018 KLF 70 kg World Championship Tournament Final 16
Kickboxing 70 kg	(Russia) Vlad Tuinov	def.	(Morocco) Ismail Benali	Decision (Unanimous)	3	3:00	2018 KLF 70 kg World Championship Tournament Final 16
Kickboxing 70 kg	(Morocco) Marouan Toutouh	def.	(Denmark) Niclas Larsen	Decision (Unanimous)	3	3:00	2018 KLF 70 kg World Championship Tournament Final 16
Kickboxing 70 kg	(China) Kong Lingfeng	def.	(Japan) Takuya Imamura	Ext.R Decision (Split)	4	3:00	2018 KLF 70 kg World Championship Tournament Reserve Fight
Kickboxing 70 kg	(Russia) Artem Pashporin	def.	(China) Zhu Baotong	Ext.R Decision (Split)	4	3:00	2018 70 kg World Championship Tournament Reserve Fight
Kickboxing 72 kg	(Democratic Republic of the Congo) Nayanesh Ayman	def.	(China) Jiao Zhou	Decision (Unanimous)	3	3:00	
Kickboxing 90 kg	(China) Hao Guanghua	def.	(Serbia) Bojan Dzepina	Decision (Unanimous)	3	3:00	
Kickboxing 67 kg	(Japan) Yuya Yamato	def.	(China) Lu Jianbo	TKO (Leg Kicks)	3	1:26	

== Kunlun Fight 76 ==
Kunlun Fight 76
- Promotion: Kunlun Fight
- Date: September 9, 2018
- Venue: Solife Stadium
- City: Zhangqiu, China

Event chronology
Kunlun Fight 75	Kunlun Fight 76	Kunlun Fight 77

Kunlun Fight 76 was a kickboxing event held by Kunlun Fight on September 9, 2018, at the Solife Stadium in Zhangqiu, China.

=== Background ===
This event featured a 8-Female 60-kilogram Tournaments to earn the 2018 KLF 60 kg Mulan Legend World Championship.

==== 2018 KLF 60 kg Mulan Legend World Championship Tournament bracket ====
Quarterfinals
(China) Shi Lijiang	3r.
(Morocco) Anissa Haddaoui	UD
(China) Zhu Mengjia	UD
(Russia) Ekaterina Vinnikova	3r.
(China) Li Mingrui	1r.
(United States) Nili Block	KO
(China) Wang Cong	UD
(England) Niamh Kinehan	3r.

Semifinals
(Morocco) Anissa Haddaoui	4r.
(China) Zhu Mengjia	SD
(United States) Nili Block	3r.
(China) Wang Cong	UD

Final
(China) Zhu Mengjia	3r.
(China) Wang Cong	UD

=== Results ===
Kunlun Fight 76
Weight Class				Method	Round	Time	Notes
Kickboxing 60 kg	(China) Wang Cong	def.	(China) Zhu Mengjia	Decision (Unanimous)	3	3:00	2018 KLF 60 kg Mulan Legend World Championship Tournament Final
MMA 77 kg	(China) Zhang Lipeng	def.	(United States) James Chaney	Submission (Rear-Naked Choke)	1	2:17	
Kickboxing 66 kg	(China) Wei Ninghui	def.	(Brazil) Jordan Kranio	KO (Punch to the Body)	2	2:02	
Kickboxing 62 kg	(China) Fang Feida	def.	(China) Lin Qiangbang	Ext.R TKO (Punch)	4	2:19	
Kickboxing 70 kg	(Thailand) Superbon Banchamek	def.	(Democratic Republic of the Congo) Nayanesh Ayman	Decision (Unanimous)	3	3:00	2018 KLF 70 kg World Championship Tournament Final 16
Kickboxing 60 kg	(China) Wang Cong	def.	(United States) Nili Block	Decision (Unanimous)	3	3:00	2018 KLF 60 kg Mulan Legend World Championship Tournament Semi-Finals B
Kickboxing 60 kg	(China) Zhu Mengjia	def.	(Morocco) Anissa Haddaoui	Ext.R Decision (Split)	4	3:00	2018 KLF 60 kg Mulan Legend World Championship Tournament Semi-Finals A
MMA 66 kg	(China) Yan Xibo	def.	(Turkmenistan) Orazgeldi Atabayev	Submission (Rear-Naked Choke)	1	2:15	
Kickboxing 86 kg	(China) Yang Yu	def.	(North Macedonia) Daniel Stefanovski	Decision (Unanimous)	3	3:00	
Kickboxing 64 kg	(China) Sun Zhixiang	def.	(Japan) Keijiro Miyakoshi	Decision (Majority)	3	3:00	
Kickboxing 60 kg	(China) Wang Cong	def.	(England) Niamh Kinehan	Decision (Unanimous)	3	3:00	2018 KLF 60 kg Mulan Legend World Championship Tournament Quarter-Finals D
Kickboxing 60 kg	(United States) Nili Block	def.	(China) Li Mingrui	KO (Head Kick)	1	1:31	2018 KLF 60 kg Mulan Legend World Championship Tournament Quarter-Finals C
Kickboxing 60 kg	(China) Zhu Mengjia	def.	(Russia) Ekaterina Vinnikova	Decision (Unanimous)	3	3:00	2018 KLF 60 kg Mulan Legend World Championship Tournament Quarter-Finals B
Kickboxing 60 kg	(Morocco) Anissa Haddaoui	def.	(China) Shi Lijiang	Decision (Unanimous)	3	3:00	2018 KLF 60 kg Mulan Legend World Championship Tournament Quarter-Finals A
Kickboxing 66 kg	(Madagascar) Razanajatovo Fazaraly	def.	(China) Hao Yang	Decision (Unanimous)	3	3:00	Rookie Fight

== Kunlun Fight 77 ==
Kunlun Fight 77
- Promotion: Kunlun Fight
- Date: October 13, 2018
- Venue: Zhangqiu Gym Jinan
- City: Tongling, China

Event chronology
Kunlun Fight 76	Kunlun Fight 77	Kunlun Fight 78

Kunlun Fight 77 was a kickboxing event held by Kunlun Fight on October 13, 2018, at the Kunlun Fight Stadium in Tongling, China.

=== Background ===
Superbon Banchamek had to pull out the tournament because of the flu, Russian Anatoly Moiseev stepped in on short notice to square off against Morocco's Marouan Toutouh.

=== Results ===
Kunlun Fight 77
Weight Class				Method	Round	Time	Notes
Kickboxing 70 kg	(China) Zhu Baotong	def.	(China) Li Shiyuan	TKO (Punch and Knee to the Body)	2	1:36	2018 KLF 70 kg World Championship Tournament Reserve Fight
Kickboxing 70 kg	(Morocco) Marouan Toutouh	def.	(Russia) Anatoly Moiseev	Decision (Unanimous)	3	3:00	2018 KLF 70 kg World Championship Tournament Quarter-Finals
Kickboxing 70 kg	(Georgia (country)) Davit Kiria	def.	(Morocco) Nordin Ben Moh	KO (Punches)	3	2:53	2018 KLF 70 kg World Championship Tournament Quarter-Finals
Kickboxing 70 kg	(China) Feng Xingli	def.	(Spain) Jonay Risco	Decision (Majority)	3	3:00	2018 KLF 70 kg World Championship Tournament Quarter-Finals
Kickboxing 70 kg	(Belarus) Dzianis Zuev	def.	(Russia) Vlad Tuinov	Decision (Majority)	3	3:00	2018 KLF 70 kg World Championship Tournament Quarter-Finals
Kickboxing 70 kg	(China) Wang Baoduo	def.	(China) Elias Emam Muhammat	Decision (Majority)	3	3:00	2018 KLF 70 kg World Championship Tournament Reserve Fight
Kickboxing 37 kg	(China) Liu Jiaming	def.	(China) Liu Weibo	Decision (Unanimous)	2	2:00	KLF Future Star
Kickboxing 26 kg	(China) Yan Sheng	def.	(China) Yu Yaning	Decision (Unanimous)	2	2:00	KLF Future Star

== Kunlun Fight 78 ==
Kunlun Fight 78
- Promotion: Kunlun Fight
- Date: October 22, 2018
- Venue: Kunlun Fight Stadium
- City: Tongling, Anhui, China

Event chronology
Kunlun Fight 77	Kunlun Fight 78	Kunlun Fight Elite Fight Night 1

Kunlun Fight 78 was a kickboxing event held by Kunlun Fight on October 22, 2018, at the Kunlun Fight Stadium in Tongling, Anhui, China

=== Background ===
This event featured a 8-man 75-kilogram Tournaments to earn the 2018 KLF 75 kg World Championship.

==== 2018 KLF 75 kg World Championship Tournament bracket ====
Quarterfinals
(China) Tan Xiaofeng	3r.
(Belarus) Vitaly Gurkov	UD
(China) Zhao Cun	3r.
(Kazakhstan) Mergen Bilyalov	KO
(Hong Kong) Law Chosing	3r.
(Brazil) Ravy Brunow	MD
(China) Zhang Yang	MD
(Netherlands) Regilio Van Den Ent	3r.

Semifinals
(Belarus) Vitaly Gurkov	1r.
(Kazakhstan) Mergen Bilyalov	TKO
(Brazil) Ravy Brunow	3r.
(China) Zhang Yang	UD

Final
(Kazakhstan) Mergen Bilyalov	MD
(China) Zhang Yang	3r.

=== Results ===
Kunlun Fight 78
Weight Class				Method	Round	Time	Notes
Kickboxing 75 kg	(Kazakhstan) Mergen Bilyalov	def.	(China) Zhang Yang	Decision (Majority)	3	3:00	2018 KLF 75 kg World Championship Tournament Final
Kickboxing 63.5 kg	(China) Wang Kehan	def.	(France) Mallaury Kalachnikoff	Decision (Majority)	3	3:00	Female Bout
Kickboxing 75 kg	(Kazakhstan) Mergen Bilyalov	def.	(Belarus) Vitaly Gurkov	TKO (Punch to the Body)	1	1:52	2018 KLF 75 kg World Championship Tournament Semi-Finals B
Kickboxing 75 kg	(China) Zhang Yang	def.	(Brazil) Ravy Brunow	Decision (Unanimous)	3	3:00	2018 KLF 75 kg World Championship Tournament Semi-Finals A
Kickboxing 75 kg	(China) Sun Weipeng	def.	(Brazil) Diogo Sotero	Decision (Unanimous)	3	3:00	2018 KLF 75 kg World Championship Tournament Reserve Fight
Kickboxing 75 kg	(Kazakhstan) Mergen Bilyalov	def.	(China) Zhao Cun	KO (Punches)	3	2:48	2018 KLF 75 kg World Championship Tournament Quarter-Finals D
Kickboxing 75 kg	(China) Zhang Yang	def.	(Netherlands) Regilio Van Den Ent	Decision (Majority)	3	3:00	2018 KLF 75 kg World Championship Tournament Quarter-Finals C
Kickboxing 75 kg	(Brazil) Ravy Brunow	def.	(Hong Kong) Law Chosing	Decision (Majority)	3	3:00	2018 KLF 75 kg World Championship Tournament Quarter-Finals B
Kickboxing 75 kg	(Belarus) Vitaly Gurkov	def.	(China) Tan Xiaofeng	Decision (Unanimous)	3	3:00	2018 KLF 75 kg World Championship Tournament Quarter-Finals A

== Kunlun Fight Elite Fight Night 1 ==
Kunlun Fight Elite Fight Night 1
- Promotion: Kunlun Fight
- Date: November 5, 2018
- Venue: Kunlun Fight Stadium
- City: Tongling, Anhui, China

Event chronology
Kunlun Fight 78	Kunlun Fight Elite Fight Night 1	Kunlun Fight Elite Fight Night 2

Kunlun Fight Elite Fight Night 1 was a kickboxing event held by Kunlun Fight on November 5, 2018, at the Kunlun Fight Stadium in Tongling, Anhui, China.

=== Results ===
Kunlun Fight Elite Fight Night 2
Weight Class				Method	Round	Time	Notes
MMA 67 kg	(China) Yan Xibo	def.	(Kazakhstan) Rustem Yensebayev	Submission (Ankle Lock)	1	3:49	
Kickboxing 73 kg	(China) Zhu Baotong	def.	(China) Xu Xiying	TKO (Corner Stoppage)	2	2:15	
Kickboxing 70 kg	(China) Jiao Zhou	def.	(China) Wu Shijie	Ext.R TKO (Punches and Knee)	4	1:56	
Kickboxing 75 kg	(China) Chen Zhikang	def.	(China) Zhu Yongxin	Decision (Split)	3	3:00	
MMA 66 kg	(China) Ye Wen	def.	(China) Li Jingtao	TKO (Punches)	3	3:07	
Kickboxing 70 kg	(China) Oyang Feng	def.	(China) Guan Yirui	TKO (Punches)	1	1:44	
Kickboxing 61.5 kg	(China) Zou Huwei	def.	(Iran) Meisam Ghasemi	TKO (Punches)	2	2:45	
Kickboxing 63 kg	(China) Zhang Tao	def.	(Russia) Aleksei Starukh	TKO (Leg Kicks)	3	0:18	
Kickboxing 60 kg	(China) Hao Yijie	def.	(China) Shi Wenkang	Decision (Unanimous)	3	3:00	

== Kunlun Fight Elite Fight Night 2 ==
Kunlun Fight Elite Fight Night 2
- Promotion: Kunlun Fight
- Date: November 6, 2018
- Venue: Kunlun Fight Stadium
- City: Tongling, Anhui, China

Event chronology
Kunlun Fight Elite Fight Night 1	Kunlun Fight Elite Fight Night 2	Kunlun Fight Elite Fight Night 3

Kunlun Fight Elite Fight Night 2 was a kickboxing event held by Kunlun Fight on November 6, 2018, at the Kunlun Fight Stadium in Tongling, Anhui, China.

=== Results ===
Kunlun Fight Elite Fight Night 2
Weight Class				Method	Round	Time	Notes
MMA 77 kg	(China) Zhang Lipeng	def.	(Canada) Kevin Dellow	TKO (Elbows and Punches)	1	2:52	
MMA 59 kg	(China) Zhang Meixuan	def.	(Tajikistan) Fedya	Submission (Guillotine Choke)	1	1:23	
Kickboxing 80 kg	(China) Sun Weipeng	def.	(China) Tang Yichen	Decision (Unanimous)	3	3:00	
MMA 72 kg	(Tajikistan) Bakhtiyar Ibragimov	def.	(China) Shayilan Nuerdanbieke	KO (Kick to the Body)	1	2:49	
Kickboxing 70 kg	(China) Luo Chao	def.	(China) Feng Zhiqiang	TKO (Corner Stoppage)	3	0:38	
MMA 58 kg	(China) Banma Duoji	def.	(Brazil) Leandro Silva	TKO (Punches)	1	1:35	
Kickboxing 65 kg	(China) Chao Dailong	def.	(China) Zhang Songshan	Decision (Unanimous)	3	3:00	
Kickboxing 63 kg	(China) Peng Zhiwen	def.	(China) Song Mengxiao	Decision (Unanimous)	3	3:00	
Kickboxing 57 kg	(China) Guo Wenjie	def.	(China) Li Ping	Decision (Unanimous)	3	3:00	

== Kunlun Fight Elite Fight Night 3 ==
Kunlun Fight Elite Fight Night 3
- Promotion: Kunlun Fight
- Date: November 19, 2018
- Venue: Kunlun Fight Stadium
- City: Tongling, Anhui, China

Event chronology
Kunlun Fight Elite Fight Night 2	Kunlun Fight Elite Fight Night 3	Kunlun Fight 79

Kunlun Fight Elite Fight Night 3 was a kickboxing event held by Kunlun Fight on November 19, 2018, at the Kunlun Fight Stadium in Tongling, Anhui, China.

=== Results ===
Kunlun Fight Elite Fight Night 3
Weight Class				Method	Round	Time	Notes
Kickboxing 61 kg	(China) Zhang Tao	def.	(China) Yuan Shuo	Decision (Unanimous)	3	3:00	
Kickboxing 66 kg	(China) Luo Chao	def.	(Thailand) Chairit Neephonkrang	KO (knees to the Body)	2	2:49	
Kickboxing 80 kg	(China) Sun Weipeng	def.	(China) Xu Zhibo	KO (knees to the Body)	1	1:58	
Kickboxing 70 kg	(Thailand) Sangmoragot	def.	(China) Cao Yu	Decision (Unanimous)	3	3:00	
Kickboxing 65 kg	(Thailand) Wanchaloem	def.	(China) Fu Qingnan	Decision (Unanimous)	3	3:00	
Kickboxing 67 kg	(China) Hu Zheng	def.	(China) Yeleiman Mulali	TKO (Knees)	2	2:11	
Kickboxing 63 kg	(China) Huang Zixin	def.	(China) Liu Wei	KO (Punches)	1	2:10	
Kickboxing 61 kg	(China) Wu Zhiyuan	def.	(China) Li Feilong	Decision (Unanimous)	3	3:00	

== Kunlun Fight 79 ==
Kunlun Fight 79
- Promotion: Kunlun Fight
- Date: December 15, 2018
- Venue: Shanxi Sports Center Gymnasium
- City: Taiyuan, China

Event chronology
Kunlun Fight Elite Fight Night 3	Kunlun Fight 79	Kunlun Fight 80

Kunlun Fight 79 was a kickboxing event held by Kunlun Fight on December 15, 2018, at the Shanxi Sports Center Gymnasium in Taiyuan, China.

=== Background ===
This event featured a 8-man 66-kilogram Tournaments to earn the 2018 KLF 66 kg World Championship.

==== 2018 KLF 66 kg World Championship Tournament bracket ====
Quarterfinals
(China) Sun Zhixiang	UD
(Japan) Kenta Yamada	3r.
(China) Jia Aoqi	3r.
(Ukraine) Sergey Kulyaba	SD
(China) Gu Hui	UD
(Belgium) Nafi Bilalovski	3r.
(China) Wei Ninghui	4r.
(Morocco) Soufiane Kaddouri	UD

Semifinals
(China) Sun Zhixiang	3r.
(Ukraine) Sergey Kulyaba	UD
(China) Gu Hui	UD
(Morocco) Soufiane Kaddouri	3r.

Final
(Ukraine) Sergey Kulyaba	UD
(China) Gu Hui	3r.

=== Results ===
Kunlun Fight 80
Weight Class				Method	Round	Time	Notes
Kickboxing 66 kg	(Ukraine) Sergey Kulyaba	def.	(China) Gu Hui	Decision (Unanimous)	3	3:00	2018 KLF 66 kg World Championship Tournament Final
Kickboxing 61.5 kg	(China) Wang Wenfeng	def.	(China) Feng Liang	Decision (Unanimous)	3	3:00	
Kickboxing 70 kg	(China) Song Shaoqiu	def.	(China) Kong Lingfeng	Decision (Unanimous)	3	3:00	
Kickboxing 67 kg	(China) Zhang Chunyu	def.	(Thailand) Changpuak Jetsada Pongtong	Decision (Split)	3	3:00	
Kickboxing 66 kg	(China) Gu Hui	def.	(Morocco) Soufiane Kaddouri	Decision (Unanimous)	3	3:00	2018 KLF 66 kg World Championship Tournament Semi-Finals B
Kickboxing 66 kg	(Ukraine) Sergey Kulyaba	def.	(China) Sun Zhixiang	Decision (Unanimous)	3	3:00	2018 KLF 66 kg World Championship Tournament Semi-Finals A
MMA 59 kg	(China) Banma Duoji	def.	(Thailand) Anatpong Bunrad	Submission (Rear-Naked Choke)	3	4:11	
Kickboxing 66 kg	(China) Lv Ruilei	def.	(China) Lu Jianbo	TKO (Punches to the Body)	1	2:05	2018 KLF 66 kg World Championship Tournament Reserve Fight
Kickboxing 66 kg	(Morocco) Soufiane Kaddouri	def.	(China) Wei Ninghui	Ext.R Decision (Unanimous)	4	3:00	2018 KLF 66 kg World Championship Tournament Quarter-Finals D
Kickboxing 66 kg	(China) Gu Hui	def.	(Belgium) Nafi Bilalovski	Decision (Unanimous)	3	3:00	2018 KLF 66 kg World Championship Tournament Quarter-Finals C
Kickboxing 66 kg	(Ukraine) Sergey Kulyaba	def.	(China) Jia Aoqi	Decision (Split)	3	3:00	2018 KLF 66 kg World Championship Tournament Quarter-Finals B
Kickboxing 66 kg	(China) Sun Zhixiang	def.	(Japan) Kenta Yamada	Decision (Unanimous)	3	3:00	2018 KLF 66 kg World Championship Tournament Quarter-Finals A

== See also ==
- List of Kunlun Fight events
- 2018 in Glory
- 2018 in Glory of Heroes
- 2018 in K-1
- 2018 in ONE Championship
- 2018 in Romanian kickboxing
