= Wang Wenfeng =

Chinese kickboxer

- Born: June 20, 1993 (age 33); Hefei, Anhui, China
- Nationality: Chinese
- Height: 176 cm (5 ft 9 1/2 in)
- Weight: 61.1 kg (135 lb; 9.62 st)
- Division: Bantamweight
- Style: Muay Thai, Kickboxing
- Stance: Orthodox
- Fighting out of: China
- Team: Xingbo Shengshi Fight Club; Yatai Gym
- Years active: 2014 - present

Kickboxing record
- Total: 33
- Wins: 23
- By knockout: 4
- Losses: 9
- By knockout: 0
- Draws: 1

Wang Wenfeng (Chinese: 王文峰; born June 20, 1993) is a Chinese Muay Thai kickboxer. He is the 2018 KLF 61.5 kg tournament winner.

He was ranked as a top ten bantamweight (-65 kg) kickboxer in the world by Combat Press between June 2018 and January 2021.

== Kickboxing career ==
=== Kunlun Fight ===
Wenfeng faced the Enfusion -60 kg champion Ilias Ennahachi at Kunlun Fight 66 on November 5, 2017, in the quarterfinals of the -61.5 kg Tournament. He won the fight by decision and advanced to the semifinals, where he was able to overcome Lin Qiangbang by decision as well. He failed to capture the tournament title however, as he lost a majority decision to Saeksan Or. Kwanmuang in the tournament finals.

Wenfeng faced Giorgi Khupenia at Kunlun Fight 70 on March 11, 2018. He won the fight by unanimous decision.

Wenfeng faced Cristian Spetcu at Kunlun Fight 74 on May 13, 2018, in the quarterfinals of the Kunlun Fight -61.5 kg World Tournament. He won the fight by split decision and advanced to the semifinals of the one-day tournament, where he faced the two-weight ISKA World champion Daniel Puertas Gallardo. Wenfeng won the fight by unanimous decision. He faced beat Lin Qiangbang by unanimous decision in the finals.

Wenfeng faced the Wu Lin Feng lightweight (-63 kg) champion at David Zunwu World Fighting Championship on September 29, 2018. He lost the fight by unanimous decision.

Wenfeng faced Enzo Petricig at All Star Fight 8 on March 9, 2019. He won the fight by unanimous decision.

=== ONE Championship ===
Wengeng challenged the ONE Kickboxing Flyweight World champion Ilias Ennahachi at ONE Championship: Age Of Dragons on November 16, 2019. He lost the fight by split decision.

Wenfeng faced Azwan Che Will at ONE Championship: Reign of Dynasties 2 on October 17, 2020. He won the fight by unanimous decision.

Wanfeng was booked to face Taiki Naito at ONE: Full Blast 2 on June 11, 2021. Naito won the fight by unanimous decision.

== Championships and awards ==
Amateur

- 2012 China Muay Thai 57 kg champion
- 2015 China Muay Thai 60 kg champion
- 2015 IFMA Royal World Cup -60 kg (gold)
- 2016 China Muay Thai 60 kg champion
- 2016 Asian Beach Games -60 kg (silver)

Professional

- Kunlun Fight
  - 2017 Kunlun Fight 61.5 kg 8 Man Tournament Runner-up
  - 2018 Kunlun Fight 61.5 kg World Tournament Champion

== Fight record ==
Kickboxing record
23 Wins (4 (T)KOs), 9 Losses, 1 draw
Date	Result	Opponent	Event	Location	Method	Round	Time
2023-06-27	Win	(Russia) Saduolo	PTF	Binchuan County, China	TKO (Corner stoppage)	2	
2021-06-11	Loss	(Japan) Taiki Naito	ONE Championship: Full Blast 2	Kallang, Singapore	Decision (Unanimous)	3	3:00
2020-10-17	Win	(Malaysia) Azwan Che Will	ONE Championship: Reign of Dynasties 2	Kallang, Singapore	Decision (Unanimous)	3	3:00
2019-11-16	Loss	(Morocco) Ilias Ennahachi	ONE Championship: Age Of Dragons	Beijing, China	Decision (Split)	5	3:00
For the ONE Kickboxing Flyweight World Championship
2019-05-28	Draw	(Thailand) Johnny	MAS FIGHT	China	MAS FIGHT rules (KO or Draw)	3	3:00
2019-03-09	Win	(France) Enzo Petricig	All Star Fight 8	Thailand	Decision (Unanimous)	3	3:00
2018-12-15	Win	(China) Feng Liang	Kunlun Fight 79	China	Decision (Unanimous)	3	3:00
2018-09-29	Loss	(Germany) Denis Wosik	David Zunwu World Fighting Championship	Macau	Decision (Unanimous)	3	3:00
2018-05-13	Win	(China) Lin Qiangbang	Kunlun Fight 74 World -61.5 kg Tournament, Final	Jinan, China	Decision (Unanimous)	3	3:00
Wins the 2018 Kunlun World Tournament 61.5kg title.
2018-05-13	Win	(Spain) Daniel Puertas Gallardo	Kunlun Fight 74 World -61.5 kg Tournament, Semi Finals	Jinan, China	Decision (Unanimous)	3	3:00
2018-05-13	Win	(Romania) Cristian Spetcu	Kunlun Fight 74 World -61.5 kg Tournament, Quarter Finals	Jinan, China	Decision (Split)	3	3:00
2018-03-11	Win	(Georgia (country)) Giorgi Khupenia	Kunlun Fight 70	Sanya, China	Decision (Unanimous)	3	3:00
2017-11-05	Loss	(Thailand) Saeksan Or. Kwanmuang	Kunlun Fight 66 - 61.5 kg 8 Man Tournament, Final	Wuhan, China	Decision (Majority)	3	3:00
2017-11-05	Win	(China) Lin Qiangbang	Kunlun Fight 66 - 61.5 kg 8 Man Tournament, Semi Finals	Wuhan, China	Decision	3	3:00
2017-11-05	Win	(Morocco) Ilias Ennahachi	Kunlun Fight 66 - 61.5 kg 8 Man Tournament, Quarter Finals	Wuhan, China	Decision	3	3:00
2017-07-15	Win	(Georgia (country)) Jano Partsvania	Kunlun Fight 64	Chongqing, China	Decision (Unanimous)	3	3:00
2017-05-14	Win	(Russia) Vladimir Lytkin	Kunlun Fight 61	Sanya, China	KO	1	
2017-03-11	Loss	(Spain) Alex Dass	Kunlun Fight 58 61 kg Qualifier Tournament, Final	Roma, Italy	Decision (Unanimous)	3	3:00
2017-03-11	Win	(Italy) Andrea Serra	Kunlun Fight 58 61 kg Qualifier Tournament, Semi-Final	Roma, Italy	Decision (Split)	4	3:00
2017-01-01	Win	(Bosnia and Herzegovina) Denis Purić	Kunlun Fight 56	China	Decision (majority)	3	3:00
2016-12-03	Win	(Suriname) Sergio Wielzen	Mix Fight Gala 20	Germany	Decision	3	3:00
2016-10-30	Win	(South Korea) Chan Hyung Lee	Kunlun Fight 54	Hubei, China	Decision (Unanimous)	3	3:00
2016-09-03	Win	(United States) Kana Hyatt	Red Idol I-1 World Muaythai Championships	China	Decision (Unanimous)		
2016-06-25	Win	(Iran) Muhammad Haidari	World Fighting Champions League · Shenzhen	China			
2016-06-08	Win	(Japan) Shin Sugita	FWH	China	KO		
2016-05-28	Win	(Thailand) Sikepet	Heroes of the Silk Road 14	China	Decision (Unanimous)		
2015-10-24	Win	(Thailand) Amundi	Royal Cup Charity Fight Night	Bangkok, Thailand	KO		
2015-10-10	Loss	(Portugal) Rui Briceno	Wu Lin Feng x Dynamite Fight Night 29	Portugal	Decision	3	3:00
2015-06-02	Win	(China) Kong Long	Wu Lin Feng	China			
2015-05-22	Win	(Thailand) Lukdod Sor.Manutchai	Onesongchai	Thailand			
2014-12-05	Loss	(Thailand)	Wu Lin Feng - Thailand	Thailand	Decision	3	3:00
2014-09-28	Loss	(Morocco) Ilias Ennahachi	Wu Lin Feng - Mejiro Gym	Zaandam, Netherlands	Decision	4	3:00
2014-07-26	Loss	(Kazakhstan) Tremischov Genghis Khan	Wu Lin Feng - Kazakhstan	Kazakhstan	Decision	3	3:00
Legend: Win Loss Draw/No contest Notes

Amateur Muay Thai record
Date	Result	Opponent	Event	Location	Method	Round	Time
2016-09-	Loss	(Vietnam) Nguyễn Trần Duy Nhất	2016 Asian Beach Games, Final	Da Nang, Vietnam	Decision	3	
Wins 2016 Asian Beach Games -60kg Silver Medal
2016-09-	Win		2016 Asian Beach Games, Semi Final	Da Nang, Vietnam	Decision	3	
2015-08-22	Win	(France) Guillaume Lorenzo	2015 IFMA Royal World Cup, -60 kg Final	Bangkok, Thailand	Decision	3	
Wins 2015 IFMA Royal World Cup -60kg Gold Medal
2015-08-	Win	(Ukraine) Oleksandr Kolontai	2015 IFMA Royal World Cup, -60 kg Semi Final	Bangkok, Thailand	Decision	3	
2015-08-	Win	(Uzbekistan) Amonov	2015 IFMA Royal World Cup, -60 kg Quarter Final	Bangkok, Thailand	Decision	3	
2015-08-	Win	(United States) Travis Clay	2015 IFMA Royal World Cup, -60 kg Second Round	Bangkok, Thailand			
2015-08-	Win	(Turkey) Yusuf Samil Ozkaya	2015 IFMA Royal World Cup, -60 kg First Round	Bangkok, Thailand	Decision	3	
2012-09-09	Loss	(Russia) Kirill Tuzovskiy Anatolievich	2012 IFMA World Championships	Saint Petersburg, Russia			
2012-09-08	Win	(Malaysia) Modh Ali Yaakub	2012 IFMA World Championships	Saint Petersburg, Russia			
Legend: Win Loss Draw/No contest Notes

== See also ==
- List of male kickboxers
