= Niclas Larsen =

Danish Muay Thai fighter

- Born: Niclas R. Larsen; 1989 (age 36–37); Vallensbaek, Denmark
- Other names: The Dreamchaser; The Destroyer
- Nationality: Danish
- Height: 184 cm (6 ft 1/2 in)
- Weight: 70 kg (154 lb; 11 st)
- Reach: 72.4 in (184 cm)
- Style: Muay Thai
- Stance: Orthodox
- Fighting out of: Vallensbaek, Denmark
- Team: Extreme Muay Thai; Mikenta Gym

Kickboxing record
- Total: 63
- Wins: 48
- By knockout: 25
- Losses: 13
- By knockout: 4
- Draws: 2

Other information
- Boxing record from BoxRec

Medal record

Men's Muay Thai

Representing Denmark

IFMA European Championships
Bronze medal – third place	2022 Istanbul	75 kg

Niclas Ricky Larsen is a Danish Muay Thai fighter and kickboxer.

== Career ==
Larsen was scheduled to face Leo Bonniger at The Champions Club 10 in Hamburg, Germany for the WKU World Muay Thai middleweight title on April 27, 2013. He won the fight by decision after five round and captured the title.

On May 19, 2013, Larsen faced Yassine Cherkaoui at Arena Fight 25. He won the fight by doctor stoppage in the second round.

Larsen was called to replace Sanny Dahlbeck in a fight against Andy Ristie at Glory 10: Los Angeles - Middleweight World Championship Tournament in Ontario, California on September 28, 2013. He lost the fight via unanimous decision.

Larsen was set to fight Steve Moxon at Glory 15: Istanbul on 12 April 2014. He won the fight via second-round TKO.

In 2016 Larsen contracted a staph infection to the leg which had him close to amputation and made him unable to compete for a year. Larsen made his return to competition on February 24, 2017, at Glory 38: Chicago with a unanimous decision victory over Lukasz Plawecki.

Larsen faced Marouan Toutouh at Kunlun Fight 75 in the opening round of the 2018 Kunlun Fight MAX tournament. He lost the fight by unanimous decision.

Larsen was called to replace Liam Nolan on short notice to face Youssef Boughanem for the WBC Muay Thai World middleweight title at PSM Fight Night on July 17, 2022. Boughanem defeated Larsen by unanimous decision to retain the WBC Muay Thai middleweight title, as well as capture the WBC Muay Thai Diamond middleweight championship.

On December 12, 2020, Larsen faced Carsten Ringer for the IMC World Super Welterweight title. He won the fight by knockout in the third round.

On December 11, 2021, Larsen faced Valentin Thibaut for the vacant WBC Muay Thai World Super Welterweight title. He won the fight by unanimous decision to become the new champion.

=== ONE Championship ===
Larsen faced Tawanchai P.K.Saenchai at ONE 158 on June 3, 2022. He lost the bout by knock out in the second round.

Larsen faced Jimmy Vienot on October 21, 2022, at ONE 162. He lost the fight by unanimous decision.

Larsen faced Eddie Abasolo on March 25, 2023, at ONE Fight Night 8. At the weigh-ins, Abasolo weighed in at 158.8 pounds, 3.8 pounds over the featherweight limit. The bout proceeded at catchweight with Abasolo was fined their purse of his purse, which went to Larsen. He lost the fight via knockout in the second round.

Larsen was scheduled to face Jo Nattawut on December 9, 2023, at ONE Fight Night 17. However, Larsen withdrew from the bout due to injury and was replaced by promotional newcomer Luke Lessei.

== Titles and accomplishments ==
- International Sport Kickboxing Association
  - 2025 ISKA K-1 World Middleweight (75 kg) Champion
- World Boxing Council Muay Thai
  - 2021 WBC Muay Thai World Super Welterweight Champion
- International Muaythai Council
  - 2020 IMC World Super Welterweight Champion
- World Kickboxing Union
  - 2013 WKU Muay Thai World Middleweight Champion
- International Federation of Muaythai Associations
  - 2022 IFMA European Championships -75 kg (bronze)

== Fight record ==
Muay Thai & Kickboxing record
48 Wins (25 (T)KOs), 13 Losses, 2 Draws
Date	Result	Opponent	Event	Location	Method	Round	Time
2025-10-11	Win	(Finland) Kristoffer Björkskog	KOMBA 1	Copenhagen, Denmark	Decision (Unanimous)		
Wins the vacant ISKA K-1 World Middleweight (75kg) title.
2024-11-21	Win	(Italy) Clemente Verdicchio	EFL 2	Copenhagen, Denmark	Decision (unanimous)	3	3:00
2023-03-25	Loss	(United States) Eddie Abasolo	ONE Fight Night 8	Kallang, Singapore	KO (punch)	2	2:14
2022-10-21	Loss	(France) Jimmy Vienot	ONE 162	Kuala Lumpur, Malaysia	Decision (unanimous)	3	3:00
2022-06-03	Loss	(Thailand) Tawanchai P.K. Saenchaimuaythaigym	ONE 158	Kallang, Singapore	KO (Left cross)	2	1:42
2021-12-11	Win	(France) Valentin Thibaut	Extreme Muay Thai	Køge, Denmark	Decision (Unanimous)	5	3:00
Wins the vacant WBC Muay Thai World Super Welterweight title.
2021-07-17	Loss	(Morocco) Youssef Boughanem	PSM Fight Night	Brussels, Belgium	Decision (Unanimous)	5	3:00
For the WBC Muay Thai World middleweight title and the WBC Muay Thai Diamond middleweight title.
2020-12-12	Win	(Germany) Carsten Ringler	Day of Destruction 14	Hamburg, Germany	KO (Elbow)	3	
Wins the vacant IMC World Super Welterweight title.
2019-09-14	Win	(China) Liu Hainan	Kunlun Fight 83	Zunyi, China	Decision (Unanimous)	3	3:00
2019-01-27	Loss	(Thailand) Buakaw Banchamek	All Star Fight 7	Phuket, Thailand	TKO (Referee stoppage)	3	
2018-08-05	Loss	(Morocco) Marouan Toutouh	Kunlun Fight 75 1/8 Finals	Sanya, China	Decision (Unanimous)	3	3:00
2018-05-21	Loss	(Thailand) Petchtanong Banchamek	All Star Fight 4	Hong Kong	Decision (Unanimous)	3	3:00
2018-04-01	Win	(China) Tian Xin	Kunlun Fight 71, Final	Qingdao, China	Decision (Unanimous)	3	3:00
2018-04-01	Win	(Thailand) Noppakao Siriluck	Kunlun Fight 71, Semi Finals	Qingdao, China	KO (Flying knee)	2	2:47
2017-12-09	Loss	(Morocco) Tyjani Beztati	Glory 49: Rotterdam, Semi Final	Rotterdam, Netherlands	Decision (Unanimous)	3	3:00
2017-09-02	Win	(France) James Lemarié	Mikenta Fight Night	Denmark	TKO	2	
2017-06-10	Loss	(Netherlands) Massaro Glunder	Glory 42: Paris	Paris, France	TKO (2 knockdowns)	1	2:18
2017-04-29	Win	(Thailand) Yodkhunpon Sitmonchai	Glory 40: Copenhagen	Copenhagen, Denmark	Decision (unanimous)	3	3:00
2017-02-24	Win	(Poland) Lukasz Plawecki	Glory 38: Chicago	Chicago, USA	Decision (Unanimous)	3	3:00
2016-02-27	Draw	(Germany) Andrej Bruhl	Mikenta Fight Night	Albertslund, Denmark	Decision	3	3:00
2014-12-20	Loss	(Russia) Khayal Dzhaniev	Top King World Series, Tournament Quarter Final	Hong Kong	Decision	3	3:00
2014-11-15	Win	(Slovakia) Vladimir Konsky	Top King World Series, Tournament 1/8 Final	France	KO (Punch)	1	
2014-09-08	Win	(Latvia) Edgar Freimanis	Fight Arena 29	Denmark	KO (Knees)	1	3:00
Defends WKU Muay Thai World Middleweight title.
2014-05-03	Win	(Netherlands) Cedric Bacuna	Fight Arena 28	Denmark	TKO (Doctor stoppage)	1	
2014-04-12	Win	(Australia) Steve Moxon	Glory 15: Istanbul	Istanbul, Turkey	TKO (punches)	2	1:33
2013-09-28	Loss	(Suriname) Andy Ristie	Glory 10: Los Angeles	Ontario, California, USA	Decision (unanimous)	3	3:00
2013-09-14	Win	(Germany) Ulli Schick	Fight Arena 26	Denmark	KO (Jumping knee)	1	
2013-05-19	Win	(Spain) Yassine Cherkaoui	Fight Arena 25	Denmark	TKO (Doctor stoppage)	2	
2013-04-27	Win	(Germany) Leo Bönniger	The Champions Club 10	Bamberg, Germany	Decision	5	3:00
Wins WKU Muay Thai World Middleweight title.
2013-04-10	Win	(Netherlands) Umar Quandt	Fight Arena 24	Denmark	Decision	5	3:00
2013-	Win	(Sweden) Sahil Siraj	Fight Arena 23	Denmark	Decision	5	2:00
2012-10-20	Win	(Latvia) Alexsandr Skrejvers	Fight Arena 22	Albertslund, Denmark	KO (Knees)	3	
2011-10-15	Loss	(France) Walid Haddad	TK2 World Max 2011: Fight Code Final 8	Aix-en-Provence, France	Decision	3	3:00
2011-06-11	Win	(Turkey) Vahit Arslan	Bodyattack Cup, Final	Hamburg, Germany	TKO		
2011-06-11	Win	(Netherlands) Eyevan Danenberg	Bodyattack Cup, Semi Final	Hamburg, Germany	KO (Right cross)		
2011-06-11	Win	(Germany) Florian Schöpp	Bodyattack Cup, Quarter Final	Hamburg, Germany	KO (Left hook)	1	
2011-03-26	Win	(Sweden) Akapop Perrys Gym	Ring Fight Arena	Sweden	Decision	5	2:00
2010-09-25	Win	(Sweden) Akapop Perrys Gym	Fight Arena 20	Albertslund, Denmark	TKO (Doctor stoppage)	2	
2010-02-	Win	(Romania) Anghel Cardos	Rising Starz 2	Denmark	Decision	5	2:00
Legend: Win Loss Draw/No contest Notes

Amateur Muay Thai record
Date	Result	Opponent	Event	Location	Method	Round	Time
2022-02-19	Loss	(Norway) Oliver-Mathias Kongsgård Hansen	2022 IFMA European Championship, Semi Final	Istanbul, Turkey	Decision (29:28)	3	3:00
Wins 2022 IFMA European Championship -75kg Bronze Medal.
2022-02-17	Win	(Spain) Nayanesh Ayman	2022 IFMA European Championship, Quarter Final	Istanbul, Turkey	Decision (30:27)	3	3:00
2022-02-14	Win	(Montenegro) Milos Petrovic	2022 IFMA European Championship, First Round	Istanbul, Turkey	TKO (Referee stoppage)	1	
2012-09-10	Loss	(Russia) Zaynalabid Magomedov Gablitdinovich	2012 IFMA World Championships, Quarter Finals	Saint Petersburg, Russia			
2012-09-08	Win	(Canada) Peter Arbeau	2012 IFMA World Championships, First Round	Saint Petersburg, Russia			
2012-04-	Win	(Sweden) Ricardo Gonzales	2012 IFMA European Championships, 1/8 Finals	Antalya, Turkey			
2011-02-05	Win	(Denmark) Michael Strom	2011 Danish Muay Thai Championship, Final	Denmark	KO (Punches)	1	
Wins 2011 Denmark Muay Thai -71kg title.
2011-02-05	Win	(Denmark) Rabie Jradi	2011 Danish Muay Thai Championship, Semi Final	Denmark	Decision	2	3:00
2010-02-06	Win	(Denmark) Morten Pedersen	2010 Danish Muay Thai Championship, Final	Denmark	TKO (Doctor stoppage)	2	
Wins 2010 Denmark Muay Thai -71kg title.
Legend: Win Loss Draw/No contest Notes
