= Lin Qiangbang =

Chinese kickboxer

- Born: 1997; 29 years ago Xuwen, China
- Other names: 瘋狂的小黑
- Nationality: Chinese
- Height: 164 cm (5 ft 5 in)
- Weight: 61 kg (134 lb; 9.6 st)
- Style: Kickboxing
- Stance: Orthodox
- Fighting out of: China
- Team: Qiangbang Fighting Club
- Years active: 2016–2019

Kickboxing record
- Total: 17
- Wins: 13
- By knockout: 4
- Losses: 4
- By knockout: 1

Lin Qiangbang (Chinese: 林强邦, born 1997) is a Chinese kickboxer.

As of September 2018 he was ranked #7 Bantamweight in the world by Combat Press.

== Championships and awards ==
- 2018 Kunlun Fight 61.5 kg World Tournament runner-up

== Kickboxing record ==
Kickboxing record
Date	Result	Opponent	Event	Location	Method	Round	Time
2019-01-26	Win	(Thailand) Sattawat	Kunlun Fight City Hero 215	Xuwen, China	Decision (unanimous)	3	3:00
2018-09-09	Loss	(China) Fang Feida	Kunlun Fight 76	Zhangqiu District, China	Ext.R TKO (punch)	4	2:19
2018-06-01	Win	(Thailand) Amnat Ruenroeng	Kunlun Fight Macao	Macau, China	Decision (unanimous)	3	3:00
2018-05-13	Loss	(China) Wang Wenfeng	Kunlun Fight 74 World -61.5 kg Tournament, Final	Jinan, China	Decision (unanimous)	3	3:00
For the 2018 Kunlun World Tournament 61.5kg title.
2018-05-13	Win	(China) Jiang Feng	Kunlun Fight 74 World -61.5 kg Tournament, Semi Final	Jinan, China	KO (punches)	1	1:10
2018-05-13	Win	(Japan) Taiga	Kunlun Fight 74 World -61.5 kg Tournament, Quarter Final	Jinan, China	Decision (majority)	3	3:00
2018-04-15	Win	(Russia) Vladimir Litkyn	Kunlun Fight 72	Beijing, China	KO (punches and head kicks)	2	0:32
2017-11-05	Loss	(China) Wang Wenfeng	Kunlun Fight 66 - 61.5 kg 8 Man Tournament, Semi Finals	Wuhan, China	Decision	3	3:00
2017-11-05	Win	(United States) Joe Gogo	Kunlun Fight 66 - 61.5 kg 8 Man Tournament, Quarter Finals	Wuhan, China	Decision	3	3:00
2017-07-15	Win	(Thailand) Saipetch Ponjaroen	Kunlun Fight 64	Chongqing, China	Decision (unanimous)	3	3:00
2017-06-10	Win	(Japan) Nobutoshi Kondo	Kunlun Fight 62	Bangkok, Thailand	Decision	3	3:00
2017-04-23	Loss	(Portugal) Antonio Freitas	Kunlun Fight 60	Guizhou, China	Decision	3	3:00
2017-03-25	Win	(Thailand) Saipetch Ponjaroen	Kunlun Fight 59	Sanya, China	Decision (unanimous)	3	3:00
2017-02-26	Win	(Brazil) Italo Freitas	Kunlun Fight 57	Sanya, China	KO (punch to the body)	3	1:08
2016-12-10	Win	(Hong Kong) Lau Waicheuk	Kunlun Fight 55	Qingdao, China	TKO	3	
2016-08-20	Win	(China) Hao Jiahao	Kunlun Fight 50	Jinan, China	Decision	3	3:00
2016-06-15	Win	(China) Lv Junyu	Kunlun Fight 45	Chengdu, China	Decision (unanimous)	3	3:00
Legend: Win Loss Draw/no contest Notes
