= Marouan Toutouh =

Moroccan-Dutch kickboxer (born 1994)

- Born: 10 May 1994 (age 32)
- Nationality: Dutch; Moroccan
- Height: 189 cm (6 ft 2 1/2 in)
- Weight: 77 kg (170 lb; 12 st)
- Style: Kickboxing
- Stance: Orthodox
- Fighting out of: Apeldoorn, Netherlands
- Team: Bora Gym, Vos Gym
- Years active: 2014 - present

Kickboxing record
- Total: 33
- Wins: 20
- By knockout: 5
- Losses: 12
- By knockout: 2
- Draws: 1

Marouan Toutouh (May 10, 1994) is a Moroccan-Dutch kickboxer. A professional competitor since 2014, Toutouh is the 2018 Enfusion Abu Dhabi -72.5 kg Tournament runner-up and the 2019 Kunlun Fight World Max -70 kg Tournament runner-up.

== Kickboxing career ==
=== Kunlun Fight ===
Toutouh took part in the 2017 Kunlun Fight lightweight qualifying tournament, held at Kunlun Fight 59 on March 25, 2017. Toutouh faced Janis Ziedins in the semifinal bout and won it by a first-round knockout. Toutouh faced Khayal Dzhaniev in the final bout of the one-day tournament, and won it by technical knockout, as Dzhaniev retired from the bout in the third round.

Before taking part in the 2017 KLF final tournament, Toutouh was booked to face Davit Kiria at Kunlun Fight 63 on June 24, 2017. He won the fight by majority decision, after an extra round was fought. The pair fought an immediate rematch in the opening round of the 2017 KLF MAX tournament, held Kunlun Fight 65 on August 27, 2017. Kiria won their second meeting by unanimous decision.

Toutouh faced the two-time K-1 World MAX champion Buakaw Banchamek at Kunlun Fight 67 on November 12, 2017. He lost the fight by a first-round knockout. Toutouh briefly left Kunlun Fight, as he was booked to face Jamal Yusupov at Wu Lin Feng 2018: -60kg World Championship Tournament on March 10, 2018, in his next bout. He won the fight by decision.

Toutouh fought in the 2018 Kunlun Fight lightweight qualifying tournament as well, held at Kunlun Fight 72 on April 15, 2018. Toutouh earned his place in the finals, where he faced Milan Pales, after beating Nayanesh Ayman by decision in the semifinals. Toutouh beat Pales by a third-round technical knockout.

Toutouh made his Enfusion debut against Armen Hovhannisian at Enfusion #69 on June 23, 2018. Toutouh next faced Niclas Larsen at Kunlun Fight 75 in the opening round of the 2018 Kunlun Fight MAX tournament. He won the fight by unanimous decision. Toutouh faced Anatoly Moiseev in the tournament quarterfinals, held at Kunlun Fight 77: Hollow Throne on October 13, 2018. He won the fight by unanimous decision.

=== Enfusion ===
Toutouh took part in the 2018 Enfusion 72.5 kg tournament, held at Enfustion 76 on December 7, 2018. Toutouh faced Endy Semeleer in the tournament quarterfinals. Despite losing to Semeleer by unanimous decision, he nonetheless advanced to the semifinals, where he faced Cedric Do, as Semeleer was unable to continue competing due to injury. Toutouh beat Do by a third-round technical knockout and advanced to the tournament finals, where he faced Superbon Banchamek. Superbon won the fight by unanimous decision.

Toutouh faced Dzianis Zuev at Kunlun Fight 80 on February 24, 2019, in the semifinals of the Kunlun Fight MAX. He won the fight by unanimous decision and advanced to the tournament finals, where he fought a rubber match with Davit Kiria. Kiria won the fight by split decision.

Toutouh challenged the reigning Enfusion 75kg champion Endy Semeleer at Enfusion #85 on June 8, 2019. He lost the fight by unanimous decision.

Toutouh faced Nikos Papanikolaou at Gala Kickboxing Fearless 9 on November 3, 2019. He won the fight by a first-round technical knockout. Toutouh faced Imad Assli at Enfusion 93 on December 6, 2019, in his final fight of the year. He won the fight by disqualification, after being tackled out of the ring onto the judges' table by Assli in the third round.

=== ONE Championship ===
On May 5, 2022, it was announced by his promotional company that Toutouh had signed with ONE Championship. He was scheduled to make his ONE debut against Constantin Rusu at ONE 158 on June 3, 2022. He lost the fight by unanimous decision.

Toutouh faced Nikola Todorović at Senshi 15 on February 18, 2023. He lost the fight by a second-round knockout.

== Titles and accomplishments ==
- Kunlun Fight
  - 2019 Kunlun Fight World Max -70 kg Tournament Runner-up
- Enfusion
  - 2018 Enfusion Live Abu Dhabi -72.5 kg Tournament Runner-up
- World Full Contact Association
  - 2015 WFCA Benelux -72.5 kg Champion

== Kickboxing record ==
Professional Kickboxing Record
21 Wins (5 (T)KOs), 12 Losses, 1 Draw
Date	Result	Opponent	Event	Location	Method	Round	Time
2023-12-16	Win	(Spain) Victor Monfort	Enfusion 131	Wuppertal, Germany	Decision (Unanimous)	3	3:00
2023-02-28	Loss	(Serbia) Nikola Todorović	Senshi 15	Varna, Bulgaria	KO (Knee to the head)	2	2:44
2022-06-03	Loss	(Moldova) Constantin Rusu	ONE 158	Kallang, Singapore	Decision (Unanimous)	3	3:00
2021-11-12	Win	(Morocco) Nabil Ouach	Enfusion 104	Abu Dhabi, United Arab Emirates	Decision (unanimous)	3	3:00
2019-12-06	Win	(Morocco) Imad Assli	Enfusion 93	Abu Dhabi, United Arab Emirates	DQ	3	
2019-11-03	Win	(Greece) Nikos Papanikolaou	Gala Kickboxing Fearless 9	Netherlands	TKO (Doctor Stoppage)	1	
2019-06-08	Loss	(Netherlands) Endy Semeleer	Enfusion #85	Groningen, Netherlands	Decision (Unanimous)	5	3:00
For the Enfusion Live 75kg World Title.
2019-02-24	Loss	(Georgia (country)) Davit Kiria	Kunlun Fight 80, Final	Shanghai, China	Decision (Split)	3	3:00
For the Kunlun Fight World Max Tournament title
2019-02-24	Win	(Belarus) Dzianis Zuev	Kunlun Fight 80, Semi Finals	Shanghai, China	Decision (Unanimous)	3	3:00
2018-12-07	Loss	(Thailand) Superbon Banchamek	Enfusion Live 76 - 72.5kg 8 Man Tournament, Final	Abu Dhabi, United Arab Emirates	Decision (Unanimous)	3	3:00
For the Enfusion Live 72.5kg Tournament.
2018-12-07	Win	(France) Cedric Do	Enfusion Live 76 - 72.5kg 8 Man Tournament, Semi Finals	Abu Dhabi, United Arab Emirates	TKO	3	
2018-12-07	Loss	(Netherlands) Endy Semeleer	Enfusion Live 76 - 72.5kg 8 Man Tournament, Quarter Finals	Abu Dhabi, United Arab Emirates	Decision (Unanimous)	3	3:00
Despite losing the fight, resumes tournament due to Semeleer's injury.
2018-11-17	Win	(Netherlands) Regilio Van Den Ent	Enfusion #74, Final	Groningen, Netherlands	Decision	3	3:00
Qualifies for the Abu Dhabi Enfusion Live 72.5kg Tournament.
2018-11-17	Win	(Belgium) Yassin Baitar	Enfusion #74, Semi Final	Groningen, Netherlands	Decision	3	3:00
2018-10-13	Win	(Russia) Anatoly Moiseev	Kunlun Fight 77: Hollow Throne (Quarter Finals)	Tongling, China	Decision (Unanimous)	3	3:00
2018-08-05	Win	(Denmark) Niclas Larsen	Kunlun Fight 75 1/8 Finals	China	Decision (Unanimous)	3	3:00
2018-06-23	Win	(Armenia) Armen Hovhannisian	Enfusion #69	Groningen, Netherlands	Decision	3	3:00
2018-04-15	Win	(Slovakia) Milan Pales	Kunlun Fight 72 Qualifying Round, Final	China	TKO (Knees)	3	1:41
2018-04-15	Draw	(Democratic Republic of the Congo) Nayanesh Ayman	Kunlun Fight 72 Qualifying Round, Semi Final	China	Decision	3	3:00
Toutouh advances in the tournament due to Ayman's point deduction after missing weight.
2018-03-10	Win	(Russia) Jamal Yusupov	Wu Lin Feng 2018: -60kg World Championship Tournament	Jiaozuo, China	Decision	3	3:00
2017-11-12	Loss	(Thailand) Buakaw Banchamek	Kunlun Fight 67	Sanya, China	KO (Left hook)	2	1:03
2017-08-27	Loss	(Georgia (country)) Davit Kiria	kunlun Fight 65 – 70 kg World Max 2017 Tournament 1/8 Finals	Qingdao, China	Decision (Unanimous)	3	3:00
2017-06-24	Win	(Georgia (country)) Davit Kiria	Kunlun Fight 63	Sanya, China	Ext. R Decision (Majority)	4	3:00
2017-03-25	Win	(Russia) Khayal Dzhaniev	Kunlun Fight 59 70 kg Qualifier Tournament 5 Final	Sanya, China	TKO (Retirement)	3	3:00
2017-03-25	Win	(Latvia) Janis Ziedins	Kunlun Fight 59 70 kg Qualifier Tournament 5 Semi-Final B	Sanya, China	KO (Knee)	1	1:04
2017-02-25	Win	(Belgium) Zakaria Baitar	Enfusion Rookies	Alphen aan den Rijn, Netherlands	Decision	3	3:00
2016-10-21	Loss	(Estonia) Mirkko Moisar	XFS	Estonia	Ext.R Decision	4	0:00
2016-09-24	Win	(Netherlands) Nordin van Roosmalen	Battle events	Arnhem, Netherlands	Decision	3	3:00
2016-06-04	Win	(Netherlands) Hasan Toy	King of The Ring	Netherlands	Decision	3	3:00
2015-11-28	Loss	(Netherlands) Redouan Laarkoubi	Fightsense, Final	Netherlands	Ext.R Decision	4	3:00
2015-11-28	Win	(Netherlands) Samir Kasrioui	Fightsense, Semi Final	Netherlands	Decision	3	3:00
2015-10-31	Win	(Netherlands) Marcel Verhaar	King of the Ring	Netherlands	Decision	3	3:00
Wins WFCA Benelux -72.5kg Title.
2015-06-06	Loss	(Netherlands) Angar Nassr	Enfusion Fighting Rookies	Eindhoven, Netherlands	Ext.R Decision	4	3:00
2014-12	Loss	(Turkey) Yahya Alemdağ	Oneshot	Turkey	Decision	3	3:00
2014-10-04	Win	(Belgium) Karakurt Kendal	Battle of Arnhem	Arnhem, Netherlands	Decision	3	3:00
Legend: Win Loss Draw/No contest Notes

== See also ==
- List of male kickboxers
