= ONE Fight Night 22 =

Combat sport events in 2024

ONE Fight Night 22: Sundell vs. Diachkova
- The poster for ONE Fight Night 22: Sundell vs. Diachkova
- Promotion: ONE Championship
- Date: May 4, 2024
- Venue: Lumpinee Boxing Stadium
- City: Bangkok, Thailand

Event chronology
ONE Friday Fights 61: Phetsukumvit vs. Duangsompong	ONE Fight Night 22: Sundell vs. Diachkova	ONE Friday Fights 62: Mongkolkaew vs. ET 2

ONE Fight Night 22: Sundell vs. Diachkova was a combat sport event produced by ONE Championship that took place on May 4, 2024, at Lumpinee Boxing Stadium in Bangkok, Thailand.

== Background ==
A ONE Women's Strawweight Muay Thai World Championship bout between current champion Smilla Sundell and Natalia Diachkova headlined the event. At the weigh-ins, Sundell came in at 126.5 lb (after coming in at 127.7 lb in for an unofficial check two and a half hours into the weigh-ins), 1.5 pounds over the strawweight limit for a title fight. As a result, Sundell was stripped of the title and only Diachkova was eligible to win it.

Former ONE Bantamweight Kickboxing Champion Hiroki Akimoto made his return after a 1-year and 5-month hiatus against former K-1 Lightweight Champion and promotional newcomer Wei Rui in a bantamweight kickboxing bout.

At the weigh-ins, Maurice Abévi weighed in at 174 pounds, four pound over the lightweight limit. His bout proceeded at catchweight and he was fined a percent of his purse which went to his opponent The Ultimate Fighter: China welterweight winner Zhang Lipeng.

== Results ==
Fight card (Amazon Prime Video)
Weight class				Method	Round	Time	Notes
Women's Strawweight Muay Thai	Smilla Sundell	def.	Natalia Diachkova	TKO (punches to the body and knees)	2	2:59	(Note: For the vacant ONE Women's Strawweight Muay Thai World Championship (as Sundell missed weight and was stripped the title, only Diachkova was eligible).)
Featherweight	Akbar Abdullaev	def.	Halil Amir	KO (punches)	2	2:52
Lightweight Muay Thai	Dmitry Menshikov	def.	Sinsamut Klinmee	KO (knees and punch to the body)	3	1:33
Lightweight	Maurice Abévi	def.	Zhang Lipeng	Decision (unanimous)	3	5:00	(Note: Abévi missed weight (174 lb).)
Bantamweight Kickboxing	Wei Rui	def.	Hiroki Akimoto	Decision (unanimous)	3	3:00
Flyweight	Reece McLaren	def.	Hu Yong	Decision (split)	3	5:00
Lightweight Kickboxing	Rungrawee Sitsongpeenong	def.	Bogdan Shumarov	Decision (split)	3	3:00
Women's Atomweight	Chihiro Sawada	def.	Noelle Grandjean	Decision (unanimous)	3	5:00
Strawweight Muay Thai	Zakaria El Jamari	def.	Thongpoon P.K.Saenchai	Decision (unanimous)	3	3:00
Catchweight (132 lb) Submission Grappling	Bianca Basílio	def.	Nanami Ichikawa	Technical Submission (rear-naked choke)	1	0:35
Flyweight Muay Thai	Sean Climaco	def.	Josue Cruz	KO (punch)	1	2:06

== Bonus awards ==
The following fighters received $50,000 bonuses.

- Performance of the Night: Akbar Abdullaev

== See also ==
- 2024 in ONE Championship
- List of ONE Championship events
- List of current ONE fighters
- ONE Championship Rankings
