= Anissa Haddaoui =

Moroccan kickboxer

- Born: Anissa Haddaoui; 30 May 1991 (age 35); Almere, Netherlands
- Nickname: "Nissie"
- Nationality: Moroccan; Dutch
- Height: 1.70 m (5 ft 7 in)
- Weight: 65 kg (143 lb; 10 st 3 lb)
- Division: Lightweight; Super Lightweight
- Style: Kickboxing, Muay Thai, Boxing, Brazilian jiu-jitsu
- Stance: Orthodox
- Fighting out of: Oostzaan, Netherlands
- Team: Mike's Gym
- Trainer: Mike Passenier
- Rank: Blue belt in Brazilian Jiu Jitsu under Gracie Barra
- Years active: 2008 - present

Professional boxing record
- Total: 3
- Wins: 3

Kickboxing record
- Total: 48
- Wins: 42
- Losses: 5
- Draws: 1

Mixed martial arts record
- Total: 2
- Losses: 2

Other information
- Mixed martial arts record from Sherdog

Anissa Haddaoui (born 30 May 1991) is a Dutch-Moroccan boxer, kickboxer, muay thai fighter and BJJ practitioner, who has been professionally competing since 2008.

She is a former EBF two weight European champion, IRO European and World kickboxing champion, World Fighting League Muay Thai Champion and Muay Thai tournament winner, as well as the Kunlun Fight World Mulan Championship winner. She has also won the IBJJF European BJJ Championships bronze medal as a white belt.

Combat Press ranked her as one of the top ten female fighters since August 2017. Combat Press ranks her as the #10 female pound for pound fighter in the world, as of November 2020.

== Kickboxing and muay thai career ==
Anissa Haddaoui made her professional kickboxing debut in 2008. Her first fight was against Helen Garnett, who gave Haddaoui her first professional loss, by unanimous decision.

In 2013 Haddaoui faced Rachel Adamus during Rumble of the North III for the IRO European Title which she won by unanimous decision.

In 2016 Haddaoui entered the World Fighting League 65 kg Tournament. In the semi-finals she defeated the future Enfusion world champion Sheena Widdershoven by unanimous decision. In the finals she fought Ilona Wijmans which she won by unanimous decision.

Haddaoui fought Rachel Adamus during The Warriors 4 for the IRO World Title, winning by unanimous decision.

She next entered the Kunlun Fight Mulan Legend Tournament. She defeated Marisa Pires in the quarter-finals, but lost to Laëtitia Madjene in the semi-finals. Madjene would later withdraw from the tournament and Haddaoui fought Wang Kehan in the final. which she won by unanimous decision.

In March 2018 Haddaoui defended her WFL title against Michaela Michel in which she would lose the title through unanimous decision.

Haddaoui entered the 2018 edition of the Mulan Legend as well. Despite defeating Shi Lijiang in the quarter-finals, she would drop a split decision to Zhu Mengjia in the semi-finals.

== Mixed martial arts career ==
Haddaoui has two MMA fights to date. The first was in 2014 against Lena Buytendijk during Battle Under The Tower, which she lost by unanimous decision. The second came in 2017 against Antonina Shevchenko, during Phoenix FC 3, when she once again lost by unanimous decision.

== Championships and accomplishments ==
=== Boxing ===
- European Boxing Federation
  - EBF European 63.5 kg Championship
  - EBF European 65 kg Championship

=== Kickboxing ===
- International Ringsports Organisation
  - IRO European 65 kg Kickboxing Championship
  - IRO World 65 kg Kickboxing Championship
- Kunlun Fight
  - Kunlun Fight World Mulan Championship, 61.5 kg

=== Muay Thai ===
- World Fighting League
  - WFL 4-Woman A-Class Muay Thai 65 kg Tournament Winner
  - WFL 65 kg Muay Thai Championship

=== Brazilian Jiu Jitsu ===
- IBJJF European Championship
  - 2015 White Belt Middleweight: 3rd Place

== Kickboxing record ==
Kickboxing record
42 wins (4 KOs), 5 losses, 1 draw
Date	Result	Opponent	Event	Location	Method	Round	Time	Record
24 Feb 2019	Win	(China) Zhang Ye	Kunlun Fight 80	Shanghai, China	TKO (Injury)	1	3:00	
9 Sep 2018	Loss	(China) Zhu Mengjia	Kunlun Fight 76	Zhangqiu, China	Decision (Split)	4	3:00	
2018 KLF 60KG Mulan Legend Semi finals.
9 Sep 2018	Win	(China) Shi Lijiang	Kunlun Fight 76	Zhangqiu, China	Decision (Unanimous)	3	3:00	
2018 KLF 60KG Mulan Legend Quarter finals.
6 May 2018	Win	(Belgium) Anke Van Gestel	Kunlun Fight 73	Sanya, China	Decision (Unanimous)	3	3:00	
25 Mar 2018	Win	(Germany) Michaela Michl	World Fighting League: Final 8 Wildcard Tournament	Almere, Netherlands	Decision (Unanimous)	3	3:00	
Lost the WFL 65 kg World Title.
26 Aug 2017	Win	(Poland) Kamila Balanda	Ladies Fight Night 6: IRA	Rawa Mazowiecka, Poland	Decision (Unanimous)	3	3:00	
15 Jul 2017	Win	(China) Wang Kehan	Kunlun Fight 64	Chongqing, China	Decision (Unanimous)	3	3:00	
Mulan Legend Tournament Finals.
14 May 2017	Loss	(France) Laëtitia Madjene	Kunlun Fight 61	Sanya, China	Decision (Unanimous)	3	3:00	
Mulan Legend Tournament Semi-finals.
30 Oct 2016	Win	(Portugal) Marisa Pires	Kunlun Fight 54	Wuhan, China	Decision (Unanimous)	3	3:00	
Mulan Legend Tournament Quarter-finals.
8 Oct 2016	Win	(Netherlands) Rachel Adamus	The Warriors 4	Norg, Netherlands	Decision (Unanimous)	5	3:00	
Wins the IRO World Title.
10 Sep 2016	Win	(Ukraine) Alisa Bazhukova	Ladies Fight Night 3: The FeMMAgeddon	Warsaw, Poland	Decision (Unanimous)	3	3:00	
7 May 2016	Loss	(Belgium) Anke Van Gestel	King Of The Ring IX	Hamme, Belgium	Decision (Unanimous)	3	3:00	
3 Apr 2016	Win	(Netherlands) Ilona Wijmans	World Fighting League: Where Heroes Meet Legends	Almere, Netherlands	Decision (Unanimous)	3	3:00	
WFL Tournament Finals.
3 Apr 2016	Win	(Netherlands) Sheena Widdershoven	World Fighting League: Where Heroes Meet Legends	Almere, Netherlands	Decision (Unanimous)	3	3:00	
WFL Tournament Semi-finals.
5 Nov 2015	Win	(Belgium) Daria Albers	One More II	Oostzaan, Netherlands	Decision (Unanimous)	3	3:00	
2014	Win	(Denmark) Sanja Trbojevic	?	Netherlands	TKO	?	3:00	
2 Nov 2013	Win	(Netherlands) Rachel Adamus	Rumble of the North III	Netherlands	Decision (Unanimous)	5	3:00	
Wins the IRO European Title.
10 Nov 2012	Win	(Netherlands) Marieke Post	Old School Martial Arts Events	Netherlands	KO	3	3:00	
30 Sep 2012	Win	(Czech Republic) Martina Jindrová	Girls Fight Only 8	Wormer, Netherlands	TKO	3	3:00	
6 May 2012	Win	(Netherlands) Jaleesa Alfons	The Battle of Wormer	Wormer, Netherlands	Decision (Unanimous)	3	3:00	
2008	Win	(England) Helene Garnett	?	Sheffield, England	Decision (Unanimous)	5	3:00	
Legend: Win Loss Draw/No contest Notes

== Mixed martial arts record ==
Professional record breakdown
2 matches	0 wins	2 losses
By decision	0	2

Res.	Record	Opponent	Method	Event	Date	Round	Time	Location	Notes
Loss	0–2	Antonina Shevchenko	Decision (unanimous)	Phoenix FC 3	September 22, 2017	3	5:00	London, England	
Loss	0–1	Lena Buytendijk	Decision (unanimous)	Battle Under The Tower	February 22, 2014	3	5:00	Steenwijk, Netherlands	

== See also ==
List of female kickboxers
