= Sarel de Jong =

Dutch kickboxer (born 1996)

- Born: Sarel de Jong; 16 July 1996 (age 30); Delfzijl, Netherlands
- Nickname: "Too Strong"
- Height: 1.75 m (5 ft 9 in)
- Weight: 61 kg (134 lb; 9 st 8 lb)
- Division: Lightweight
- Style: Kickboxing
- Stance: Orthodox
- Fighting out of: Wagenborgen, Netherlands
- Team: Team van der Giessen
- Trainer: Denis van der Giessen
- Years active: 2016–2023

Kickboxing record
- Total: 21
- Wins: 18
- By knockout: 3
- Losses: 3
- By knockout: 0

Other information
- Website: https://www.sareldejong.nl/
- Last updated on: 13 May 2023

Sarel de Jong (born 16 July 1996) is a retired Dutch kickboxer who competed professionally between 2016 and 2023. She spent her entire professional career with Enfusion, where she was the Enfusion Women's Bantamweight champion.

At the amateur level, she was a four time World Association of Kickboxing Organizations medalist, a three-time gold medalist at the Kickboxing World Series, as well as a medalist at the International World Games Association.

She was continuously ranked in the pound-for-pound top ten female fighters by Combat Press between July 2019 and December 2023.

== Kickboxing career ==
=== Two-weight Enfusion champion ===
De Jong made her Enfusion promotional debut at Rookies on November 20, 2016, when she faced Krystina Lexova. She won the bout by unanimous decision. De Jong next faced Sadie Siem at Enfusion Kickboxing Talents 33 on June 3, 2017. She won the fight by unanimous decision.

De Jong faced Chellina Chirino for the vacant Enfusion 64 kg title at Enfusion 69 on June 13, 2018. She won the fight by a unanimous decision. In her next appearance with the promotion, at Enfusion 75 on November 17, 2018, De Jong faced Samira Kovacevic for the 61 kg Championship. She won the fight through a fifth-round technical knockout to become a two-weight champion.

De Jong faced Victoria Lomax in a non-title bout at Enfusion 76 on December 7, 2018. She won the fight in the third round, by stoppage. Sarel De Jong suffered her first promotional loss at Enfusion 78 on February 23, 2019, when she faced the veteran Anke Van Gestel in a non-title bout, as Van Gestel won the fight by split decision.

She made her first 64 kg title defense against Sanne de Ruiter at Enfusion 85 on June 8, 2019. She won the fight by unanimous decision. Sarel De Jong would then make a defense of her 61 kg title, as she faced Madelen Søfteland at Glorious Heroes presents Enfusion Groningen on November 16, 2019. She won the fight by a unanimous decision.

De Jong faced the WAKO welterweight world champion Mallaury Kalachnikoff in a non-title bout at Enfusion 91 on December 6, 2019. She won the fight by unanimous decision. At the end of 2019, Enfusion voted her the Best Female Fighter of the Year.

De Jong was double booked to defend her 61 kg title against Aylina "The Angel" Engel at Enfusion 97 on September 19, 2020, and her 64 kg title against Michaela Michl on November 21. She was also scheduled to participate in an ECE event on October 9, against Niamh Kinehan. De Jong retained her belt against Engel by unanimous decision. Her fight on October 9, was later cancelled, due to Kinehan's travel issues. Subsequently, De Jong was rescheduled to fight Marika Pagliaroli at Enfusion 99 on October 17, 2020. She won the fight by unanimous decision. De Jong's title defense against Michl was later postponed because of restrictions related to the COVID-19 pandemic.

De Jong was booked to fight Lucija Mudrohova at Road to ONE: Arena Friday Night Fights 2. She won the fight by knockout. After the fight, it was revealed that De Jong had suffered an anterior cruciate ligament injury, which required surgery to heal.

=== Enfusion bantamweight champion ===
De Jong faced Maria Tsiplostefanaki in a non-title bout at Enfusion 109 on June 18, 2022. She won the fight by unanimous decision. De Jong made her first Enfusion Bantamweight title defense against Vitoria De Mauro later that year, at Enfusion 116 on November 19, 2022. She retained the title by unanimous decision.

De Jong retired from the sport of kickboxing on October 3, 2023, citing burnout as the reason for quitting professional competition.

== Championships and accomplishments ==
=== Amateur kickboxing ===
- World Association of Kickboxing Organizations
  - (bronze) 2016 WAKO Senior European K-1 Championship 65 kg
  - (silver) 2017 WAKO Senior World K-1 Championship 65 kg
  - (silver) 2017 Hungarian Kickboxing World K-1 Cup 65 kg
  - (gold) 2018 WAKO Senior European K-1 Championship 65 kg
  - (gold) 2019 Yokoso K-1 Dutch Open 65 kg
  - (gold) 2019 Worldcup K-1 Austrian Classics 60 kg
  - (gold) 2019 Hungarian Kickboxing K-1 World Cup 60 kg
  - (bronze) 2019 WAKO Senior World K-1 Championship 60 kg
  - (gold) 2021 International Turkish European K-1 Cup
- International World Games Association
  - (gold) 2017 World Games Poland 65 kg

=== Professional kickboxing ===
- Enfusion
  - 2018 Enfusion Women's 64kg World Championship
    - One successful title defense
  - 2018 Enfusion World Bantamweight (-61kg) Championship
    - Four successful title defenses

=== Awards ===
- Combat Press
  - 2019 "Female Fighter of the Year" nominee
  - 2020 "Female Fighter of the Year" nominee
- Enfusion
  - 2019 "Female Fighter of the Year"

== Fight record ==
Kickboxing record
18 wins (3 KOs), 3 losses, 0 draws
Date	Result	Opponent	Event	Location	Method	Round	Time
2023-05-13	Win	(Romania) Andreea Cebuc	Enfusion 122	Wuppertal, Germany	Decision (Unanimous)	3	3:00
2022-12-16	Win	(Italy) Laura Pileri	Enfusion Dubai	Dubai, United Arab Emirates	Decision (Unanimous)	3	3:00
2022-11-19	Win	(Italy) Vitoria De Mauro	Enfusion 116	Groningen, Netherlands	Decision (Unanimous)	5	3:00
Defends the Enfusion World Bantamweight (-61kg) Championship.
2022-09-17	Win	(Portugal) Sofia Oliveira	Enfusion 110	Alkmaar, Netherlands	Decision (Unanimous)	3	3:00
2022-06-18	Win	(Greece) Maria Tsiplostefanaki	Enfusion 109	Groningen, Netherlands	Decision (Unanimous)	3	3:00
2021-06-11	Win	(Czech Republic) Lucija Mudrohova	Road to ONE: Arena Friday Night Fights 2	Belgrade, Serbia	KO	1	
2020-10-17	Win	(Italy) Marika Pagliaroli	Enfusion 99	Wuppertal, Germany	Decision (Unanimous)	3	3:00
2020-09-19	Win	(Germany) Aylina Engel	Enfusion 97	Alkmaar, Netherlands	Decision (Unanimous)	5	3:00
Defends the Enfusion World Bantamweight (-61kg) Championship.
2019-12-06	Win	(France) Mallaury Kalachnikoff	Enfusion 91	Abu Dhabi, United Arab Emirates	Decision (Unanimous)	5	3:00
2019-11-16	Win	(Norway) Madelen Søfteland	Glorious Heroes presents Enfusion Groningen	Groningen, Netherlands	Decision (Unanimous)	5	3:00
Defends the Enfusion World Bantamweight (-61kg) Championship.
2019-06-08	Win	(Netherlands) Sanne de Ruijter	Enfusion 85	Groningen, Netherlands	Decision (Unanimous)	5	3:00
Defends the Enfusion Women's 64kg World Championship.
2019-02-23	Loss	(Belgium) Anke Van Gestel	Enfusion 78	Eindhoven, Netherlands	Decision (Split)	3	3:00
2018-12-07	Win	(Spain) Victoria Lomax	Enfusion 76	Abu Dhabi, United Arab Emirates	TKO	2	
2018-11-17	Win	(Bosnia and Herzegovina) Samira Kovacevic	Enfusion 74	Groningen, Netherlands	TKO	5	
Wins the Enfusion World Bantamweight (-61kg) Championship.
2018-09-29	Loss	(China) Wang Cong	David Zunwu World Fighting Championship	Macau	Decision	3	3:00
2018-06-13	Win	(Curaçao) Chellina Chirino	Enfusion 69	Groningen, Netherlands	Decision (Unanimous)	5	3:00
Wins the Enfusion Women's 64kg World Championship.
2017-12-16	Win	(Italy) Alessia Coluccia	FightersGlory	Drachten, Netherlands	Decision (Unanimous)	3	3:00
2017-09-30	Win	(Netherlands) Layla Hassan	Battle Events	Arnheim, Netherlands	Decision	3	3:00
2017-06-03	Win	(Netherlands) Sadie Siem	Enfusion Kickboxing Talents 33	Groningen, Netherlands	Decision (Unanimous)	3	3:00
2017-02-04	Loss	(Netherlands) Shanice Josefina	Rumble Events	Beilen, Netherlands	Decision (Unanimous)	3	3:00
2016-11-20	Win	(Russia) Krystina Lexova	Enfusion Rookies	Groningen, Netherlands	Decision (Unanimous)	3	3:00
Legend: Win Loss Draw/No contest Notes

Amateur Kickboxing record
Date	Result	Opponent	Event	Location	Method	Round	Time
2021-10-	Loss	(Serbia) Milana Bjelorgic	2021 WAKO World Championships, 1/8 Final	Jesolo, Italy	Decision	3	2:00
2021-04-11	Win	(Turkey) Sultan Unal	2021 International Turkish European Cup, Final	Antalya, Turkey	Decision	3	2:00
Wins 2021 International Turkish European Cup K-1 -60kg Gold Medal.
2021-04-10	Win	(Turkey) Esra Yalin	2021 International Turkish European Cup, Semifinal	Antalya, Turkey	Decision	3	2:00
2021-04-09	Win	(Turkey) Havva Kaynak	2021 International Turkish European Cup, Quarterfinals	Antalya, Turkey	Decision	3	2:00
2019-10-	Loss	(Serbia) Milana Bjelorgic	2019 WAKO World Championships, Semi Final	Sarajevo, Bosnia and Herzegovina	Decision (2:1)	3	2:00
Wins 2019 WAKO World Championships K-1 -60kg Bronze Medal.
2019-10-	Win	(Poland) Emilia Czerwinska	2019 WAKO World Championships, Quarter Final	Sarajevo, Bosnia and Herzegovina	Decision (3:0)	3	2:00
2019-10-	Win	(Portugal) Sofia Oliveira	2019 WAKO World Championships, 1/8 Final	Sarajevo, Bosnia and Herzegovina	Decision (3:0)	3	2:00
2019-05-19	Win	(Ukraine) Iryna Chernova	2019 Hungarian K-1 Kickboxing World Cup, Final	Budapest, Hungary	Decision	3	2:00
Wins 2019 Hungarian K-1 Kickboxing World Cup -60kg Gold Medal.
2019-05-18	Win	(Austria) Stella Hemetsberger	2019 Hungarian K-1 Kickboxing World Cup, Semifinal	Budapest, Hungary	Decision	3	2:00
2019-04-14	Win	(Finland) Kaisa Musikka	2019 Worldcup Austrian Classics K-1, Final	Innsbruck, Austria	Decision	3	2:00
Wins 2019 Worldcup Austrian Classics K-1 -60kg Gold Medal.
2019-04-13	Win	(Slovakia) Lucia Szabová	2019 Worldcup Austrian Classics K-1, Semifinal	Innsbruck, Austria	Decision	3	2:00
2019-03-23	Win	(Israel) Adva Ohayon	2019 Yokoso K-1 Dutch Open, Final	Amsterdam, Netherlands	Decision	3	2:00
Wins 2019 Yokoso K-1 Dutch Open -65kg Gold Medal.
2018-10-	Win	(Serbia) Teodora Manic	2018 WAKO European Championships, Final	Bratislava, Slovakia	Decision (3:0)	3	2:00
Wins 2018 WAKO European Championships K-1 -65kg Gold Medal.
2018-10-	Win	(Czech Republic) Sarka Melinova	2018 WAKO European Championships, Semi Final	Bratislava, Slovakia	Decision (3:0)	3	2:00
2018-05-13	Loss	(Sweden) Erica Björnestrand	2018 IFMA World Championships, First Round	Cancun, Mexico	Decision (29:28)	3	3:00
2017-11-	Loss	(Serbia) Teodora Manic	2017 WAKO World Championships, Final	Budapest, Hungary	Decision (2:1)	3	2:00
Wins 2017 WAKO World Championships K-1 -65kg Silver Medal.
2017-11-	Win	(Poland) Roza Gumienna	2017 WAKO World Championships, Semi Final	Budapest, Hungary	Decision (3:0)	3	2:00
2017-11-	Win	(Russia) Adelina Zarubina	2017 WAKO World Championships, Quarter Final	Budapest, Hungary	Decision (3:0)	3	2:00
2017-07-27	Win	(Serbia) Teodora Manic	2017 WAKO at the World Games, Final	Wroclaw, Poland	Decision (3:0)	3	2:00
Wins 2017 WAKO at the World Games Kickboxing -65kg Gold Medal.
2017-07-26	Win	(United States) Kaitlin Young	2017 WAKO at the World Games, Semi Final	Wroclaw, Poland	Decision (3:0)	3	2:00
2017-07-25	Win	(Italy) Cristina Caruso	2017 WAKO at the World Games, Quarter Final	Wroclaw, Poland	Decision (3:0)	3	2:00
2016-10-28	Loss	(Italy) Cristina Caruso	2016 WAKO Senior European K-1 Championship, Semifinal	Maribor, Slovenia	Decision	3	2:00
Wins 2016 WAKO Senior European K-1 Championship -65kg Bronze Medal.
2016-10-28	Win	(Turkey) Yasin Gonkur Dundar	2016 WAKO Senior European K-1 Championship, Quarterfinal	Maribor, Slovenia	Decision	3	2:00
Legend: Win Loss Draw/No contest Notes

== See also ==
List of female kickboxers
