= Aurélie Froment =

French kickboxer (born 1987)

- Born: 7 August 1987 (age 39); Servian, Hérault, France
- Nationality: French
- Height: 1.70 m (5 ft 7 in)
- Weight: 59 kg (130 lb; 9 st 4 lb)
- Division: Super-featherweight; Lightweight
- Style: Kickboxing; Boxing
- Fighting out of: Maraussan, Hérault, France
- Team: Team Esprit Boxe Maraussan
- Years active: 2007 - present (Kickboxing); 2019 - present (Boxing)

Professional boxing record
- Total: 4
- Wins: 3
- By knockout: 1
- Draws: 1

Kickboxing record
- Total: 34
- Wins: 29
- By knockout: 4
- Losses: 5

Other information
- Boxing record from BoxRec

Aurélie Froment (born 7 August 1987) is a French boxer and kickboxer. She is the current ISKA world super-featherweight freestyle and world lightweight K-1 champion.

She is the former ISKA European super-featherweight freestyle champion, and four-time FFKMDA kickboxing champion.

== Martial arts career ==
=== Kickboxing career ===
At La Nuit des Défis III, she fought Laëtitia Madjene. Froment ended up losing a unanimous decision.

During the Kick's Night 2018 event, Froment fought Irene Martins for the ISKA freestyle super-featherweight title. She won the fight and title by a fifth-round knockout.

Fighting during Kunlun Fight 74, she faced the Kunlun tournament winner Wang Kehan. She would lose the fight after three rounds, through a unanimous decision.

=== Boxing career ===
Aurélie Froment made her boxing debut on 16 March 2019. In her first professional boxing bout Froment faced the Serbian journeyman Ksenija Medic. After four rounds Froment emerged the clear winner with all scorecards reading 40–36.

Her next fight came a month later, when she fought Helena Claveau. Froment failed to win the fight, with the judges scoring the fight a draw (38–38, 38–38, 38–38).

Following this draw, Froment was scheduled to fight another journeyman, the Bosnian native Anja Jankovic. She scored the first KO win of her career, stopping Jankovic by TKO in the third round.

Four months after their first fight, Froment and Ksenija Medic fought a rematch. Medic once again lost a unanimous decision, although she managed to win a round this time (39–37).

== Championships and accomplishments ==
- International Sport Karate Association
  - ISKA World Super Featherweight Freestyle Kickboxing Championship
  - ISKA World Lightweight K-1 Championship
  - ISKA European Super Featherweight Freestyle Kickboxing Championship
- Fédération Française de Kick Boxing, Muaythaï et Disciplines Associées
  - FFKMDA Kickboxing Championship (Four times)

== Boxing record ==
4 fights	3 wins	0 losses
By knockout	1	0
By decision	2	0
Draws	1	

No.	Result	Record	Opponent	Type	Round, time	Date	Location	Notes
4	Win	3–0–1	(Serbia) Ksenija Medic	UD	4	6 Jul 2019	Salle du four a chaux, Hérault, France	
3	Win	2–0–1	(Bosnia and Herzegovina) Anja Jankovic	TKO	3 (4), 2:59	14 Jun 2019	Complexe Sportif Municipal, Servian, France	
2	Draw	1–0–1	(France) Helena Claveau	PTS	4	4 May 2019	Gymnase Louis Boudou, Hérault, France	
1	Win	1–0	(Serbia) Ksenija Medic	UD	4	16 Mar 2019	Halle aux sports, Hérault, France	

== Kickboxing record ==
Professional Kickboxing Record
29 Wins (4 (T)KO's), 5 Losses, 0 Draw, 0 No Contest
Date	Result	Opponent	Event	Location	Method	Round	Time
2018-12-8	Win	(Italy) Irene Martins	Kick's Night 2018	Hérault, France	KO	5	3:00
Wins the ISKA Freestyle Kickboxing title.
2018-05-13	Loss	(China) Wang Kehan	Kunlun Fight 74	Jinan, China	Decision (Unanimous)	3	3:00
2017-6-3	Win	(France) Nawel Karouach	Cavalaire Kickboxing Show 2	Cavalaire-sur-Mer, France	Decision (Unanimous)	5	3:00
Wins the FFKMDA Kickboxing title.
2015-4-3	Loss	(France) Laëtitia Madjene	La Nuit des Défis III	Béziers, France	Decision (Unanimous)	3	3:00
Legend: Win Loss Draw/No contest Notes

== See also ==
- List of female kickboxers
- List of female boxers
