= Zhang Lipeng =

Chinese mixed martial arts fighter

- Born: March 10, 1990 (age 36); Tongliao, Inner Mongolia, China
- Other names: The Warrior, Dapeng, Garuda
- Nationality: Chinese
- Height: 5 ft 11 in (180 cm)
- Weight: 170 lb (77 kg; 12 st 2 lb)
- Division: Welterweight; Lightweight
- Reach: 70 in (178 cm)
- Style: Shuai Jiao, Muay Thai
- Fighting out of: Beijing, China
- Team: Fight Emperor
- Rank: Blue belt in Brazilian Jiu-Jitsu
- Years active: 2009-present

Mixed martial arts record
- Total: 50
- Wins: 35
- By knockout: 14
- By submission: 13
- By decision: 8
- Losses: 13
- By knockout: 1
- By submission: 5
- By decision: 7
- Draws: 2

Other information
- Mixed martial arts record from Sherdog

Zhang Lipeng (Chinese name 张立鹏; born March 10, 1990), is a Chinese professional mixed martial artist who competes in the Lightweight division of ONE Championship. Zhang has also competed in the lightweight division of the Ultimate Fighting Championship. He won his UFC contract through an 8-man tournament on The Ultimate Fighter: China.

== Mixed martial arts career ==
=== Early professional career ===
Zhang made his professional mixed martial arts debut in 2009, competing primarily for regional promotions in China, compiling a record of 7–7–1 before earning a tryout on the Ultimate Fighter in 2013.

=== The Ultimate Fighter: China ===
In the fall of 2013, it was announced that Zhang had been selected as one of the welterweight participants for Team Sky Dragons on the inaugural season of The Ultimate Fighter: China.

Zhang won his first fight on the show, defeating Zhu Qingxiang by submission in the first round (strikes). Zhang then went on to defeat Albert Cheng by submission (kimura) in the second round to advance to the finals.

=== Ultimate Fighting Championship ===
Zhang made his official debut facing fellow castmate Wang Sai in the welterweight finals on March 1, 2014 The Ultimate Fighter: China Finale. Zhang defeated Sai by split decision.

Zhang faced Brendan O'Reilly in a lightweight bout on August 23, 2014, at UFC Fight Night 48. Zhang defeated O'Reilly via unanimous decision.

Zhang faced Chris Wade on January 18, 2015, at UFC Fight Night 59. He lost via unanimous decision.

Zhang faced Kajan Johnson on May 16, 2015, at UFC Fight Night 66. He lost the fight via unanimous decision and was subsequently released from the promotion.

=== ONE Championship ===
Since returning to China he enjoyed considerable success with Kunlun Fight, becoming the promotion’s welterweight champion and winning 21 out of his last 24 fights (with 10 submissions and 7 knockouts). This resulted in ONE Championship signing him to a contract.

Zhang faced Eduard Folayang at ONE: Battleground 2 on August 13, 2021. He won the bout via unanimous decision.

Zhang faced Ruslan Emilbek Uulu at ONE: Only the Brave on January 28, 2022. He knocked out his opponent within 32 seconds off the first round. This win earned him the Performance of the Night award.

Zhang faced Saygid Izagakhmaev at ONE 161 on September 29, 2022. He lost the fight via unanimous decision.

Zhang faced Timofey Nastyukhin on October 6, 2023, at ONE Fight Night 15. He won the fight via technical knockout in the first round. This win earned him the Performance of the Night award.

Zhang faced Maurice Abévi on May 4, 2024, at ONE Fight Night 22. At the weigh-ins, David Onama weighted 174 pounds, which was four pounds over the lightweight limit. The bout proceeded at catchweight and he was fined a percent of his purse which went to Zhang. He lost the fight via unanimous decision.

Zhang faced Hiroyuki Tetsuka on February 8, 2025, at ONE Fight Night 28. He won the fight via knockout in the round one and this win earned the $50,000 Performance of the Night bonuses.

== Championships and accomplishments ==
- ONE Championship
  - Performance of the Night (Two times) vs. Ruslan Emilbek Uulu and Timofey Nastyukhin
- Kunlun Fight
  - KLF Welterweight Championship (One time)
  - KLF Lightweight Championship (One time)
    - One successful title defense
- Ultimate Fighting Championship
  - The Ultimate Fighter: China Welterweight Tournament winner

== Mixed martial arts record ==
Professional record breakdown
51 matches	35 wins	13 losses
By knockout	14	1
By submission	13	5
By decision	8	7
Draws	2	
No contests	1	

Res.	Record	Opponent	Method	Event	Date	Round	Time	Location	Notes
NC	35–13–2 (1)	Lucas Gabriel	NC (overturned)	ONE Fight Night 31	May 3, 2025	3	5:00	Bangkok, Thailand	Catchweight (175.25 lb) bout; Gabriel missed weight. Originally a unanimous decision win for Gabriel; overturned after he tested positive for banned substances.
Win	35–13–2	Hiroyuki Tetsuka	KO (punches)	ONE Fight Night 28	February 8, 2025	1	2:06	Bangkok, Thailand	Catchweight (178.5 lb) bout. Performance of the Night.
Loss	34–13–2	Maurice Abévi	Decision (unanimous)	ONE Fight Night 22	May 4, 2024	3	5:00	Bangkok, Thailand	Catchweight (174 lb) bout; Abévi missed weight.
Win	34–12–2	Timofey Nastyukhin	TKO (punches)	ONE Fight Night 15	October 7, 2023	1	3:18	Bangkok, Thailand	Performance of the Night.
Loss	33–12–2	Saygid Izagakhmaev	Decision (unanimous)	ONE 161	September 29, 2022	3	5:00	Kallang, Singapore	
Win	33–11–2	Ruslan Emilbek Uulu	KO (punches)	ONE: Only the Brave	January 28, 2022	1	0:32	Kallang, Singapore	Performance of the Night.
Win	32–11–2	Eduard Folayang	Decision (unanimous)	ONE: Battleground 2	August 13, 2021	3	5:00	Kallang, Singapore	
Win	31–11–2	Mohammad Naeemi	Submission (triangle choke)	Kunlun Fight 83	September 14, 2019	1	4:00	Zunyi, China	
Draw	30–11–2	Ednilson Barros Santos	Draw (unanimous)	Kunlun Fight 81	July 27, 2019	3	5:00	Beijing, China	
Win	30–11–1	Kevin Dellow	TKO (elbows and punches)	Kunlun Fight: Elite Fight Night 2	November 6, 2018	1	2:52	Zhangqiu, China	
Win	29–11–1	James Chaney	Submission (rear-naked choke)	Kunlun Fight 76	September 9, 2018	1	2:18	Zhangqiu, China	
Loss	28–11–1	Elnur Agaev	Decision (split)	Kunlun Fight World Tour: Russia	May 26, 2018	3	5:00	Khabarovsk, Russia	
Win	28–10–1	Bagautdin Abasov	Submission (rear-naked choke)	Kunlun Fight 71	April 1, 2018	2	3:07	Qingdao, China	
Win	27–10–1	Italo da Silva Goncalves	TKO (elbows)	Kunlun Fight 69	February 4, 2018	2	1:47	Guiyang, China	
Win	26–10–1	Mikey Vaotuua	Submission (rear-naked choke)	Kunlun Fight MMA 16 / AFC 21	October 28, 2017	1	1:35	Melbourne, Australia	
Loss	25–10–1	Rodrigo Caporal	KO (punches)	Kunlun Fight MMA 15	October 3, 2017	1	4:46	Alashan, China	
Win	25–9–1	Ivica Truscek	TKO (punches)	Kunlun Fight MMA 14	August 28, 2017	1	N/A	Qingdao, China	
Win	24–9–1	Stanislav Dobeshev	TKO (punches)	Kunlun Fight MMA 13	July 6, 2017	1	N/A	Qingdao, China	
Win	23–9–1	Rodrigo Caporal	Decision (unanimous)	Kunlun Fight MMA 11	May 4, 2017	3	5:00	Jining, China	
Win	22–9–1	Hermes França	Decision (unanimous)	Kunlun Fight MMA 9	February 2, 2017	3	5:00	Sanya, China	
Win	21–9–1	Leandro Rodrigues Pontes	TKO (punches)	Kunlun Fight MMA 8	January 2, 2017	1	2:52	Sanya, China	Won the Kunlun Fight MMA Welterweight Championship.
Win	20–9–1	Javier Fuentes	TKO (punches)	Kunlun Fight 55	December 10, 2016	1	N/A	Qingdao, China	Catchweight (165 lb) bout.
Win	19–9–1	Adam Boussif	Submission (rear-naked choke)	Kunlun Fight 53	September 24, 2016	2	3:17	Beijing, China	Defended the Kunlun Fight MMA Welterweight Championship.
Win	18–9–1	Yul Kim	Decision (unanimous)	Kunlun Fight 47	July 10, 2016	3	5:00	Nanjing, China	
Win	17–9–1	Jan Quaeyhaegens	Submission (rear-naked choke)	Kunlun Fight 45	June 5, 2016	1	N/A	Chengdu, China	
Win	16–9–1	Cesar Alonso	TKO (punches)	Kunlun Fight 44	May 14, 2016	1	2:40	Khabarovsk, Russia	
Win	15-9-1	Takashi Noto	KO (punches)	Kunlun Fight 43	April 23, 2016	1	3:20	Zhoukou, China	
Win	14–9–1	Beibit Nazarov	Decision (unanimous)	Kunlun Fight 37	January 23, 2016	3	5:00	Sanya, China	Return to Welterweight. Won the Kunlun Fight MMA Welterweight Championship.
Win	13–9–1	Hong Young-ki	Submission (rear-naked choke)	Road FC 027	26 December 2015	1	1:33	Shanghai, China	
Win	12–9–1	Gadzhimusa Gadzhiev	Submission (north-south choke)	Kunlun Fight 34	November 21, 2015	2	1:31	Shenzhen, China	Catchweight (159 lb) bout.
Win	11–9–1	Amr Fathee Wahman	Submission (armbar)	Kunlun Fight 33	October 31, 2015	1	4:23	Hunan, China	Catchweight (159 lb) bout.
Win	10–9–1	Makoto Maeda	Submission (rear-naked choke)	Kunlun Fight: Cage Series 4	October 4, 2015	1	1:53	Astana, Kazakhstan	Catchweight (159 lb) bout.
Loss	9–9–1	Kajan Johnson	Decision (unanimous)	UFC Fight Night: Edgar vs. Faber	May 16, 2015	3	5:00	Pasay, Philippines	
Loss	9–8–1	Chris Wade	Decision (unanimous)	UFC Fight Night: McGregor vs. Siver	January 18, 2015	3	5:00	Boston, Massachusetts, United States	
Win	9–7–1	Brendan O'Reilly	Decision (unanimous)	UFC Fight Night: Bisping vs. Le	August 24, 2014	3	5:00	Macau, SAR, China	Return to Lightweight.
Win	8–7–1	Wang Sai	Decision (split)	The Ultimate Fighter China Finale: Kim vs. Hathaway	March 1, 2014	3	5:00	Macau, SAR, China	Won The Ultimate Fighter: China Welterweight tournament.
Win	7–7–1	Isamu Himura	TKO (punches)	Tai'an International Cage Fighting Tournament	June 29, 2013	2	N/A	Shandong, China	Welterweight debut.
Loss	6–7–1	Chris Garcia	Technical Submission (guillotine choke)	Real Fight MMA 2	May 11, 2013	1	0:34	Zhengzhou, China	
Loss	6–6–1	Marcos Yoshio Souza	Decision (unanimous)	Real Fight MMA 1	December 1, 2012	2	5:00	Zhengzhou, China	Catchweight (176 lb) bout.
Win	6–5–1	Oh Jae-seong	Submission	Real Fight MMA 1	December 1, 2012	1	N/A	Zhengzhou, China	Catchweight (176 lb) bout.
Win	5–5–1	Pengfei Xuan	TKO (submission to punches)	Ranik Ultimate Fighting Federation 5	September 8, 2012	1	1:10	Hohhot, China	
Loss	4–5–1	Arthit Hanchana	Submission (triangle choke)	Ranik Ultimate Fighting Federation 4	June 30, 2012	3	2:53	Hohhot, China	
Loss	4–4–1	Rodrigo Caporal	Decision (split)	Ranik Ultimate Fighting Federation 3	March 24, 2012	3	5:00	Chongqing, China	
Draw	4–3–1	Aziz Pahrudinov	Draw	Top of the Forbidden City 7	October 8, 2011	3	5:00	Beijing, China	
Win	4–3	Yier Ta	Submission (triangle choke)	Ranik Ultimate Fighting Federation 1	August 27, 2011	1	3:00	Shanghai, China	
Loss	3–3	Gadji Zaipulaev	Submission (guillotine choke)	MFP: Mayor's Cup 2011	May 7, 2011	2	4:30	Khabarovsk, Russia	
Loss	3–2	Tony Rossini	Submission (armbar)	Legend FC 2	June 24, 2010	1	2:56	Hong Kong, SAR, China	
Win	3–1	Andrei Miroshnikov	KO (punches)	MFP: Governor's Cup of Sakhalin 2010	April 30, 2010	1	N/A	Yuzhno-Sakhalinsk, Russia	
Loss	2–1	Claes Beverlov	Submission (armbar)	Art of War FC 14	September 26, 2009	1	1:58	Macau, SAR, China	
Win	2–0	Yao Qiang	Submission (triangle choke)	Art of War FC 13	July 18, 2009	1	1:58	Beijing, China	
Win	1–0	Arthit Hanchana	Decision (unanimous)	Ultimate Martial Arts Combat	April 18, 2009	2	5:00	Beijing, China	Lightweight debut.

=== Mixed martial arts exhibition record ===
Exhibition record breakdown		
2 matches	2 wins	0 losses
By knockout	0	0
By submission	2	0
By decision	0	0

Res.	Record	Opponent	Method	Event	Date	Round	Time	Location	Notes
Win	2–0	Albert Cheng	Submission (kimura)	The Ultimate Fighter: China	26 January 2014	2	N/A	Beijing, China	TUF: China Welterweight Semi-Final.
Win	1–0	Zhu Qingxiang	Submission (punches)	The Ultimate Fighter: China	14 December 2013 (airdate)	1	N/A	Beijing, China	TUF: China Welterweight Quarter-Finals.

== See also ==
- List of current ONE fighters
- List of male mixed martial artists
