= 2017 in Kunlun Fight =

Information
- First date: January 1
- Last date: December 17

Events
- Total events: 22

The year 2017 was the 4th year in the history of the Kunlun Fight, a kickboxing promotion based in China. 2017 started with Kunlun Fight 56.

The events were broadcasts through television agreements in mainland China with Jiangsu TV and around the world with various other channels. The events were also streamed live on the Kunlun Fight app and multiple other services. Traditionally, most Kunlun Fight events have both tournament fights and superfights (single fights).

== Champions ==
Weight	Name	Event	Date	Notes
MMA Bantamweight	(China) Meixuan Zhang def. Kirihito Kodama	Kunlun Fight MMA 8	January 2, 2017	MMA Title Fight
MMA Welterweight	(China) Lipeng Zhang def. Leandro Rodrigues	Kunlun Fight MMA 8	January 2, 2017	MMA Title Fight
MMA Welterweight	(United States) Alesha Zappitella def. Miao Ding	Kunlun Fight MMA 9	February 25, 2017	Women's MMA Title Fight
MMA Flyweight	(China) Meixuan Zhang def. Masaharu Tsuchihashi	Kunlun Fight MMA 11	May 4, 2017	MMA Title Fight
MMA Welterweight	(China) Lipeng Zhang def. Rodrigo Caporal	Kunlun Fight MMA 11	May 4, 2017	MMA Title Fight
MMA Strawweight	(China) Weili Zhang def. Simone Duarte	Kunlun Fight MMA 11	May 4, 2017	Women's MMA Title Fight
MMA Strawweight	(China) Weili Zhang def. Aline Sattelmayer	Kunlun Fight MMA 12	June 1, 2017	Women's MMA Title Fight
MMA Lightweight	(China) Haotian Wu def. Zack Shaw	Kunlun Fight MMA 12	June 1, 2017	MMA Title Fight
MMA Middleweight	(Ukraine) Artem Shokalo def. Sai Wang	Kunlun Fight MMA 12	June 1, 2017	MMA Title Fight
MMA Featherweight	(Russia) Aliyar Sarkerov def. Tuerxun Jumabieke	Kunlun Fight MMA 13	July 6, 2017	MMA Title Fight
MMA Strawweight	(China) Weili Zhang def. Marilia Santos	Kunlun Fight MMA 14	August 28, 2017	Women's MMA Title Fight
MMA Bantamweight	(Spain) Oscar Suarez def. Meixuan Zhang	Kunlun Fight MMA 14	August 28, 2017	MMA Title Fight
MMA Welterweight	(China) Lipeng Zhang def. Ivica Trušček	Kunlun Fight MMA 14	August 28, 2017	MMA MMA Title Fight
MMA	(China) Weili Zhang def. Bianca Sattelmayer	Kunlun Fight MMA 15	October 3, 2017	Women's MMA Title Fight
MMA Welterweight	(Brazil) Rodrigo Caporal def. Lipeng Zhang	Kunlun Fight MMA 15	October 3, 2017	MMA Title Fight
Kickboxing 61.5 kg	(Thailand) Saeksan Somai def. Wang Wenfeng (final) def. Jiao Daobo (semifinal) def. Yang Guang (quarterfinal)	Kunlun Fight 66	November 5, 2017	2017 One Night 8-man 61.5 kg World Championship Tournament
Kickboxing 75 kg	(Belarus) Vitaly Gurkov def. Hossein Karami (final) def. Arthit Hanchana (semifinal) def. Nuerla Mulali (quarterfinal)	Kunlun Fight 66	November 5, 2017	2017 One Night 8-man 75 kg World Championship Tournament
Kickboxing 66 kg	(China) Yang Zhuo def. Singdam Kiatmuu9 (final) def. David Mejia (semifinal) def. Wei Ninghui (quarterfinal)	Kunlun Fight 67	November 12, 2017	2017 One Night 8-man 66 kg World Championship Tournament
Kickboxing 52.5 kg	(China) Guan Acui def. Weili Zhang (final) def. Xu Yi (semifinal) def. Elaine Lopes (quarterfinal)	Kunlun Fight 68	December 17, 2017	Women's 2017 Legend of Mulan One Night 8-woman World Championship Tournament
Kickboxing 95+kg	(Iran) Iraj Azizpour def. Roman Kryklia (final) def. Asihati (semifinal) def. Ye Xiang (quarterfinal)	Kunlun Fight 68/Kunlun Fight 69	February 4, 2018	2017 Multi-Part Super Heavyweight 8-man World Championship Tournament. Quarterfinal bouts on Kunlun Fight 68 and 4-man one night finals on Kunlun Fight 69
Kickboxing 70 kg	(Armenia) Marat Grigorian def. Superbon Banchamek (final) def. Dzianis Zuev (semifinal) def. Mohamed Mezouari (quarterfinal) def. Jomthong Chuwattana (Final 16)	Kunlun Fight 58/Kunlun Fight 67/Kunlun Fight 69	February 4, 2018	2017 Multi-Part 70 kg World Championship Tournament

== Events lists ==
=== List of Kunlun Fight events ===
#	Date	Event	Venue	Location
83	December 17, 2017	Kunlun Fight 68	Honghuagang Sport Center	Zunyi, China
82	November 12, 2017	Kunlun Fight 67	Mangrove Tree International Conference Center	Sanya, Hainan, China
81	November 5, 2017	Kunlun Fight 66	Optics Valley International Tennis Center	Wuhan, China
80	October 28, 2017	Kunlun Fight MMA 16	Melbourne Pavilion	Melbourne, Australia
79	October 3, 2017	Kunlun Fight MMA 15	Alxa Dream Park	Alxa, China
78	August 28, 2017	Kunlun Fight MMA 14	Mangrove Resort German Village Square	Qingdao, China
77	August 27, 2017	Kunlun Fight 65	Mangrove Resort German Village Square	Qingdao, China
76	July 15, 2017	Kunlun Fight 64	Jiangnan Stadium	Chongqing, China
75	July 6, 2017	Kunlun Fight MMA 13	Mangrove Tree Resort	Qingdao, China
74	June 24, 2017	Kunlun Fight 63	Mangrove Tree International Conference Center	Sanya, Hainan, China
73	June 10, 2017	Kunlun Fight 62	Workpoint Studios	Bangkok, Thailand
72	June 1, 2017	Kunlun Fight MMA 12	Lake Park	Dolon Nor, China
71	May 14, 2017	Kunlun Fight 61	Mangrove Tree International Conference Center	Sanya, Hainan, China
70	May 4, 2017	Kunlun Fight MMA 11	Jining High-Tech Zone Stadium	Shandong, China
69	April 23, 2017	Kunlun Fight 60	Honghuagang Sports Center	Guizhou, China
68	April 10, 2017	Kunlun Fight MMA 10	Kunlun Fight World Combat Sports Center	Beijing, China
67	March 25, 2017	Kunlun Fight 59	Mangrove Tree International Conference Center	Sanya, Hainan, China
66	March 11, 2017	Kunlun Fight 58 / Magnum FC 1	Atlantico Live	Rome, Italy
65	February 26, 2017	Kunlun Fight 57	Mangrove Tree International Conference Center	Sanya, Hainan, China
64	February 25, 2017	Kunlun Fight MMA 9	Mangrove Tree International Conference Center	Sanya, Hainan, China
63	January 2, 2017	Kunlun Fight MMA 8	Mangrove Tree International Conference Center	Sanya, Hainan, China
62	January 1, 2017	Kunlun Fight 56	Mangrove Tree International Conference Center	Sanya, Hainan, China

=== List of Road to Kunlun events ===
#	Date	Event	Venue	Location
16	November 15, 2017	Road to Kunlun 16		Shijiazhuang, China
15	November 14, 2017	Road to Kunlun 15		Shijiazhuang, China
14	November 13, 2017	Road to Kunlun 14		Shijiazhuang, China
13	November 4, 2017	Road to Kunlun 13		Shijiazhuang, China
12	December 3, 2017	Road to Kunlun 12		Shijiazhuang, China
11	October 21, 2017	Road to Kunlun 11		Shijiazhuang, China
10	September 23, 2017	Road to Kunlun 10	Kunlun Fight World Combat Sports Center	Beijing, China
9	August 13, 2017	Road to Kunlun 9		Tangshan, China
8	August 4, 2017	Road to Kunlun 8		Shijiazhuang, China
7	July 1, 2017	Road to Kunlun 7		Pingshan, China
6	June 18, 2017	Road to Kunlun 6		Shijiazhuang, China
5	June 3, 2017	Road to Kunlun 5		Tianjin, China
4	May 13, 2017	Road to Kunlun 4		Tangshan, China
3	April 22, 2017	Road to Kunlun 3		Shijiazhuang, China
2	April 4, 2017	Road to Kunlun 2		Tangshan, China
1	March 4, 2017	Road to Kunlun 1		Hebei, China

== Kunlun Fight 56 ==
Kunlun Fight 56
- Promotion: Kunlun Fight
- Date: January 1, 2017
- Venue: Mangrove Tree International Conference Center
- City: Sanya, Hainan, China

Event chronology
Kunlun Fight MMA 7	Kunlun Fight 56	Kunlun Fight MMA 8

Kunlun Fight 56 was a kickboxing event held by Kunlun Fight on January 1, 2017, at the Mangrove Tree International Conference Center in Sanya, Hainan, China.

=== Background ===
==== 2016 KLF 70 kg World Max Championship Tournament bracket ====
Final 16 feat. in Kunlun Fight 48, 50 & 52
(Suriname) Sergio Kanters	3r.
(China) Wu Xuesong	DEC
(Suriname) Cedric Manhoef	DEC
(China) Kong Lingfeng	3r.
(Russia) Khayal Dzhaniev	2r.
(Thailand) Superbon Banchamek	KO
(Thailand) Sitthichai Sitsongpeenong	DEC
(Portugal) Diogo Neves	3r.
(Belarus) Andrei Kulebin	3r.
(China) Tian Xin	DEC
(Thailand) Jomthong Chuwattana	DEC
(South Korea) Lee Sung-Hyun	3r.
(Belarus) Dzianis Zuev	3r.
(Georgia (country)) Davit Kiria	DEC
(Netherlands) Mohamed Mezouari	DEC
(Thailand) Arthit Hanchana	3r.

Quarter-finals feat. in Kunlun Fight 53, 54
(China) Wu Xuesong	3r.
(Suriname) Cedric Manhoef	DEC
(Thailand) Superbon Banchamek	DEC
(Thailand) Sitthichai Sitsongpeenong	3r.
(China) Tian Xin	3r.
(Thailand) Jomthong Chuwattana	DEC
(Georgia (country)) Davit Kiria	-
(Netherlands) Mohamed Mezouari	-

Semi-finals
(Suriname) Cedric Manhoef	3r.
(Thailand) Superbon Banchamek	UD
(Thailand) Jomthong Chuwattana	UD
(Georgia (country)) Davit Kiria	4r.

Final
(Thailand) Superbon Banchamek	KO
(Thailand) Jomthong Chuwattana	3r.

=== Results ===
Kunlun Fight 56
Weight Class				Method	Round	Time	Notes
Kickboxing 70 kg	(Thailand) Superbon Banchamek	def.	(Thailand) Jomthong Chuwattana	KO (Punch)	3	0:21	2016 KLF 70 kg World Championship Tournament Final
Kickboxing 70 kg	(Belarus) Andrei Kulebin	def.	(China) Wu Xuesong	Decision (Unanimous)	3	3:00	
Kickboxing 70 kg	(Thailand) Superbon Banchamek	def.	(Suriname) Cedric Manhoef	Decision (Unanimous)	3	3:00	2016 KLF 70 kg World Championship Tournament Semi-finals
Kickboxing 70 kg	(Thailand) Jomthong Chuwattana	def.	(Georgia (country)) Davit Kiria	Ext.R Decision (Unanimous)	4	3:00	2016 KLF 70 kg World Championship Tournament Semi-finals
Kickboxing 70 kg	(Thailand) Buakaw Banchamek	def.	(China) Tian Xin	Decision (Unanimous)	3	3:00	
Kickboxing 65 kg	(China) Wei Ninghui	def.	(Spain) Juan Javier Barragan	KO (Punch)	1	2:59	
Kickboxing 67 kg	(China) Gu Hui	def.	(Ukraine) Sergey Kulyaba	Decision (Unanimous)	3	3:00	
Kickboxing 100 kg	(Belarus) Andrei Gerasimchuk	def.	(Brazil) Felipe Micheletti	Decision (Unanimous)	3	3:00	
Kickboxing 70 kg	(Morocco) Mohamed Mezouari	def.	(Belarus) Dzianis Zuev	Decision (Unanimous)	3	3:00	2016 KLF 70 kg World Championship Tournament Reserve Fight
Kickboxing 70 kg	(Russia) Khayal Dzhaniev	def.	(Thailand) Arthit Hanchana	Decision (Unanimous)	3	3:00	2016 KLF 70 kg World Championship Tournament Reserve Fight
Kickboxing 60 kg	(China) Wang Wenfeng	def.	(Canada) Denis Puric	Decision (Majority)	3	3:00	
Kickboxing 75 kg	(Azerbaijan) Parviz Abdullayev	def.	(Hong Kong) Ma Shuo	Decision (Majority)	3	3:00	
Kickboxing 60 kg	(China) Li Xiaomao	def.	(China) Lin Zhiqiang	KO (Punch to the Body)	1	1:29	
Kickboxing 70 kg	(China) Zhang Yansong	def.	(China) Zhu Baotong	Decision (Unanimous)	3	3:00	

== Kunlun Fight MMA 8 ==
Kunlun Fight MMA 8
- Promotion: Kunlun Fight
- Date: January 2, 2017
- Venue: Mangrove Tree International Conference Center
- City: Sanya, Hainan, China

Event chronology
Kunlun Fight 56	Kunlun Fight MMA 8	Kunlun Fight MMA 9

Kunlun Fight MMA 8 was a mixed martial arts event held by Kunlun Fight on January 2, 2017, at the Mangrove Tree International Conference Center in Sanya, Hainan, China.

=== Results ===
Kunlun Fight MMA 8
Weight Class				Method	Round	Time	Notes
MMA 77 kg	(China) Zhang Lipeng	def.	(Brazil) Leandro Rodrigues	TKO (Punches)	1	2:52	KLF MMA Welterweight Championship
MMA 61 kg	(China) Meixuan Zhang	def.	(Japan) Kirihito Kodama	Submission (Guillotine Choke)	2	2:53	KLF MMA Bantamweight Championship
MMA 52 kg	(China) Weili Zhang	def.	(Netherlands) Veronica Grenno	KO (Knees to the Body)	1	1:52	Female Bout
MMA 66 kg	(China) Bolin Li	def.	(Moldova) Sergei Ionel	Submission (Armbar)	1	4:47	
MMA 61 kg	(China) Huoyixibai	def.	(Spain) Soufian Ben Zerrouk	Submission (Rear-Naked Choke)	1	2:02	
MMA 77 kg	(Mongolia) Batmunkh Burenzorig	def.	(Pakistan) Nosherwan Khanzada	Submission (Rear-Naked Choke)	1	3:49	
MMA 61 kg	(China) Jiahao Hao	def.	(China) Yeerzati	TKO (Punches)	1	4:24	
MMA 70 kg	(China) Yafei Feng	def.	(China) Aili	Decision (Unanimous)	3	5:00	

== Kunlun Fight MMA 9 ==
Kunlun Fight MMA 9
- Promotion: Kunlun Fight
- Date: February 25, 2017
- Venue: Mangrove Tree International Conference Center
- City: Sanya, Hainan, China

Event chronology
Kunlun Fight MMA 8	Kunlun Fight MMA 9	Kunlun Fight 57

Kunlun Fight MMA 9 will be a mixed martial arts event held by Kunlun Fight on February 25, 2017, at the Mangrove Tree International Conference Center in Sanya, Hainan, China.

=== Results ===
Kunlun Fight MMA 9
Weight Class				Method	Round	Time	Notes
MMA 57 kg	(United States) Alesha Zappitella	def.	(China) Ding Miao	Submission (Arm-Triangle Choke)	2	1:16	Female Bout
MMA 77 kg	(China) Zhang Lipeng	def.	(Brazil) Hermes França	Decision (Unanimous)	3	5:00	
MMA 52 kg	(China) Weili Zhang	def.	(Brazil) Nayara Hemily	Submission (Guillotine Choke)	1	0:40	Female Bout
MMA 70 kg	(China) Wu Haotian	-	(Brazil) Leandro Rodrigues	Draw (Split)	3	5:00	
MMA 57 kg	(China) Heqin Lin	def.	(Latvia) Valerija Sotchenko	TKO (Punches)	1	3:11	Female Bout
MMA 66 kg	(Russia) Vladimir Vivdych	def.	(China) Jiahao Hao	Submission (Triangle Choke)	2	2:12	
MMA 77 kg	(China) Shuwei Sun	def.	(Costa Rica) Sergio Ortiz Rodriguez	Decision (Split)	3	5:00	
MMA 61 kg	(Spain) Jose Francisco	def.	(China) Junying Hou	Submission (Rear-Naked Choke)	1	1:20	
MMA 77 kg	(Russia) Alexander Merezhko	def.	(China) Jia Liu	Submission (Rear-Naked Choke)	1	2:56	
MMA 66 kg	(China) Kang Kang Fu	def.	(China) Akenbieke Ayijiake	Decision (Majority)	3	5:00	

== Kunlun Fight 57 ==
Kunlun Fight 57
- Promotion: Kunlun Fight
- Date: February 26, 2017
- Venue: Mangrove Tree International Conference Center
- City: Sanya, Hainan, China

Event chronology
Kunlun Fight MMA 9	Kunlun Fight 57	Kunlun Fight 58 / Magnum FC 1

Kunlun Fight 57 was a kickboxing event held by Kunlun Fight on February 26, 2017, at the Mangrove Tree International Conference Center in Sanya, Hainan, China.

=== Background ===
This event featured two 4-Man 70-kilogram qualifying Tournaments to earn a spot in 2017 KLF 70 kg World Championship Tournament.

==== 2017 KLF 70 kg World championship Qualifying bracket 1 ====
Semifinals
(Brazil) Danilo Zanolini	MD
(China) Hua Xu	3r.
(Morocco) Mohamed Mezouari	UD
(Armenia) Arman Hambaryan	3r.

Final
(Brazil) Danilo Zanolini	1r.
(Morocco) Mohamed Mezouari	KO

==== 2017 KLF 70 kg World championship Qualifying bracket 2 ====
Semifinals
(China) Kong Lingfeng	TKO
(Romania) Daniel Corbeanu	2r.
(Belarus) Andrei Kulebin	UD
(Belgium) Ali Makhi	3r.

Final
(China) Kong Lingfeng	3r.
(Belarus) Andrei Kulebin	UD

=== Results ===
Kunlun Fight 57
Weight Class				Method	Round	Time	Notes
Kickboxing 70 kg	(Belarus) Andrei Kulebin	def.	(China) Kong Lingfeng	Decision (Unanimous)	3	3:00	2017 KLF 70 kg World Championship Qualifying Tournament 2 Final
Kickboxing 70 kg	(Thailand) Yodsanklai Fairtex	def.	(Russia) Sayfullah Hambakhadov	TKO (Corner Stoppage)	2	1:28	
Kickboxing 65 kg	(China) Wei Ninghui	def.	(Thailand) Kompetch Fairtex	Decision (Unanimous)	3	3:00	
Kickboxing 70 kg	(Belarus) Andrei Kulebin	def.	(Belgium) Ali Makhi	Decision (Unanimous)	3	3:00	2017 KLF 70 kg World Championship Qualifying Tournament 2 Semi-finals B
Kickboxing 70 kg	(China) Kong Lingfeng	def.	(Romania) Daniel Corbeanu	TKO (Retirement)	2	3:00	2017 KLF 70 kg World Championship Qualifying Tournament 2 Semi-finals A
Kickboxing 70 kg	(Morocco) Mohamed Mezouari	def.	(Brazil) Danilo Zanolini	KO (Kick to the Body)	1	0:20	2017 KLF 70 kg World Championship Qualifying Tournament 1 Final
Kickboxing 100+ kg	(China) Ye Xiang	def.	(United States) Steve Banks	TKO (Punches)	1	0:29	
Kickboxing 63.5 kg	(China) Lin Qiangbang	def.	(Brazil) Italo Freitas	KO (Punch to the Body)	3	1:08	
Kickboxing 77 kg	(Hong Kong) Law Chosing	def.	(Thailand) Krit	KO (Punches)	1	0:58	
Kickboxing 70 kg	(Morocco) Mohamed Mezouari	def.	(Armenia) Arman Hambaryan	Decision (Unanimous)	3	3:00	2017 KLF 70 kg World Championship Qualifying Tournament 1 Semi-finals B
Kickboxing 70 kg	(Brazil) Danilo Zanolini	def.	(China) Hua Xu	Decision (Majority)	3	3:00	2017 KLF 70 kg World Championship Qualifying Tournament 1 Semi-finals A
KB Rookie Fight 63 kg	(China) Liu Moudun	def.	(China) Li Bangying	TKO (Punches)	1	2:40	

== Kunlun Fight 58 / Magnum FC 1 ==
Kunlun Fight 58 / Magnum FC 1
- Promotion: Kunlun Fight
- Date: March 11, 2017
- Venue: Atlantico Live
- City: Rome, Italy

Event chronology
Kunlun Fight 57	Kunlun Fight 58 / Magnum FC 1	Kunlun Fight 59

Kunlun Fight 58 / Magnum FC 1 was a kickboxing event held by Kunlun Fight and Magnum Fighting Championship on March 11, 2017, at the Atlantico Live in Rome, Italy.

=== Background ===
This event featured two 4-Man qualifying Tournaments to earn a spot in 2017 KLF World Championship Tournament.

==== 2017 KLF 70 kg World championship Qualifying bracket 3 ====
Semifinals
(Romania) Cristian Milea	UD
(Netherlands) Clayton Henriques	4r.
(Georgia (country)) Davit Kiria	UD
(Spain) Jonay Risco	3r.

Final
(Romania) Cristian Milea	1r.
(Georgia (country)) Davit Kiria	TKO

==== 2017 KLF 61 kg Muay Thai Intercontinental Championship Qualifying bracket 1 ====
Semifinals
(China) Wang Wenfeng	SD
(Italy) Andrea Serra	4r.
(Spain) Alex Dass	TKO
(Slovakia) Tomas Cincik	2r.

Final
(China) Wang Wenfeng	3r.
(Spain) Alex Dass	UD

=== Results ===
Kunlun Fight 58
Weight Class				Method	Round	Time	Notes
Kickboxing 70 kg	(Georgia (country)) Davit Kiria	def.	(Romania) Cristian Milea	TKO (Leg Injury)	1	3:00	2017 KLF 70 kg World Championship Qualifying Tournament 3 Final
Kickboxing 70 kg	(Thailand) Superbon Banchamek	def.	(Spain) Edye Ruiz	Decision (Unanimous)	3	3:00	
Muay Thai 61 kg	(Spain) Alex Dass	def.	(China) Wang Wenfeng	Decision (Unanimous)	3	3:00	2017 KLF 61 kg Intercontinental Championship Qualifying Tournament 1 Final
Kickboxing 75 kg	(China) Zhang Yang	def.	(Italy) Eugeniu Deozu	Decision (Unanimous)	3	3:00	
Kickboxing 75 kg	(Suriname) Sergio Kanters	def.	(China) Nuerla Mulali	Decision (Majority)	3	3:00	
Kickboxing 80 kg	(Italy) Giuseppe Domenico	def.	(China) Duoli Chen	Decision (Unanimous)	3	3:00	
Kickboxing 70 kg	(Portugal) Diogo Neves	def.	(Italy) Vasile Lazar	Decision (Majority)	3	3:00	
Kickboxing 70 kg	(Georgia (country)) Davit Kiria	def.	(Spain) Jonay Risco	Decision (Unanimous)	3	3:00	2017 KLF 70 kg World Championship Qualifying Tournament 3 Semi-finals B
Kickboxing 70 kg	(Romania) Cristian Milea	def.	(Netherlands) Clayton Henriques	Ext.R Decision (Unanimous)	4	3:00	2017 KLF 70 kg World Championship Qualifying Tournament 3 Semi-finals A
Muay Thai 61 kg	(Spain) Alex Dass	def.	(Slovakia) Tomas Cincik	TKO (Punch)	2	1:01	2017 KLF 61 kg Intercontinental Championship Qualifying Tournament 1 Semi-finals B
Muay Thai 61 kg	(China) Wang Wenfeng	def.	(Italy) Andrea Serra	Ext.R Decision (Split)	4	3:00	2017 KLF 61 kg Intercontinental Championship Qualifying Tournament 1 Semi-finals A
Kickboxing 65 kg	(China) Zhang Tao	def.	(Italy) Manuele Perra	KO (Punches)	3	0:42	
Magnum FC 1
MMA 77 kg	(Albania) Arber Murati	def.	(Italy) Manuel Valeri	Submission (Heel Hook)	1	2:23	
MMA 93 kg	(Netherlands) Olutobi Ayodeji Kalejaiye	def.	(Italy) Fabio Russo	TKO (Punches)	1	2:57	
MMA 93 kg	(Poland) Marcin Łazarz	def.	(Cameroon) Donald Njatah Nya	Submission (Armbar)	2	3:56	Magnum FC Light Heavyweight Tournament Quarter-finals
MMA 93 kg	(Serbia) Vladimir Filipović	def.	(Lithuania) Laurynas Urbonavicius	Submission (Triangle Choke)	3	2:55	Magnum FC Light Heavyweight Tournament Quarter-finals
MMA 93 kg	(Armenia) Hracho Darpinyan	def.	(France) Boubacar Baldé	Decision (Unanimous)	3	5:00	Magnum FC Light Heavyweight Tournament Quarter-finals
MMA 84 kg	(Democratic Republic of the Congo) Christian M'Pumbu	def.	(Brazil) Sergio Souza	DQ (Illegal Strikes)	1	1:23	
MMA 93 kg	(Croatia) Stjepan Bekavac	def.	(Aruba) Evan Nedd	TKO (Punches)	1	2:27	Magnum FC Light Heavyweight Tournament Quarter-finals
MMA 77 kg	(United States) Mauro Cerilli	def.	(Italy) Orlando D'Ambrosio	Submission (Guillotine Choke)	2	3:26	
MMA 120 kg	(Italy) Mauro Cerilli	def.	(Hungary) Istvan Ruzsinszky	TKO (Punches)	1	0:56	
MMA 77 kg	(Italy) Filippo Fagiolo	def.	(Italy) Raffaele Spallitta	TKO (Doctor Stoppage)	1	2:45	
MMA 66 kg	(Italy) Damiano Bertoli	def.	(Romania) Marco Giustarini	Decision (Unanimous)	3	5:00	
MMA 66 kg	(Italy) Silvano Pais	def.	(Romania) Claudio Iancu	Submission (Rear-Naked Choke)	1	2:29	
MMA 61 kg	(Italy) Simone D'Anna	def.	(Italy) Danilo Pastanella	KO (Punch)	1	2:25	
MMA 77 kg	(Italy) Fabio Scaravilli	def.	(Italy) Giordano Spalletti	Decision (Unanimous)	3	5:00	

== Kunlun Fight 59 ==
Kunlun Fight 59
- Promotion: Kunlun Fight
- Date: March 25, 2017
- Venue: Mangrove Tree International Conference Center
- City: Sanya, Hainan, China

Event chronology
Kunlun Fight 58 / Magnum FC 1	Kunlun Fight 59	Kunlun Fight MMA 10

Kunlun Fight 59 was a kickboxing event held by Kunlun Fight on March 25, 2017, at the Mangrove Tree International Conference Center in Sanya, Hainan, China.

=== Result ===
Kunlun Fight 59
Weight Class				Method	Round	Time	Notes
Kickboxing 70 kg	(Morocco) Marouan Toutouh	def.	(Russia) Khayal Dzhaniev	Retirement	3	3:00	2017 KLF 70 kg World Championship Qualifying Tournament 5 Final
Kickboxing 67 kg	(China) Gu Hui	def.	(Germany) Andre Brul	KO (Kick to the Body)	1	2:35	
Kickboxing 72 kg	(Serbia) Nemanja Skoric	def.	(China) Li Zhuangzhuang	Decision (Unanimous)	3	3:00	
Muay Thai 67 kg	(China) Zhang Chunyu	def.	(United States) Gladstone Allen	TKO (Elbow)	2	1:46	
Muay Thai 65 kg	(China) Lin Qiangbang	def.	(Thailand) Saipetch Ponjaroen	Decision (Unanimous)	3	3:00	
Kickboxing 70 kg	(Morocco) Marouan Toutouh	def.	(Latvia) Janis Ziedins	KO (Knee)	1	1:03	2017 KLF 70 kg World Championship Qualifying Tournament 5 Semi-finals B
Kickboxing 70 kg	(Russia) Khayal Dzhaniev	def.	(China) Tian Xin	Decision (Unanimous)	3	3:00	2017 KLF 70 kg World Championship Qualifying Tournament 5 Semi-finals A
Kickboxing 70 kg	(Serbia) Nikola Cimesa	def.	(China) Wu Xuesong	Decision (Unanimous)	3	3:00	2017 KLF 70 kg World Championship Qualifying Tournament 4 Final
Kickboxing 90 kg	(China) Zhou Wei	def.	(Iran) Meisam Eshghi	Decision (Unanimous)	3	3:00	
Kickboxing 80 kg	(China) Bo Fufan	def.	(Russia) Mikhail Romanchuk	Decision (Unanimous)	3	3:00	
Kickboxing 67 kg	(Russia) Tamerlan Akhmadov	def.	(China) Liu Guicheng	Decision (Split)	3	3:00	
Kickboxing 75 kg	(Thailand) Armin Pumpanmuang	def.	(Hong Kong) Law Chosing	TKO (Leg Injury)	1	0:40	
Kickboxing 70 kg	(Serbia) Nikola Cimesa	def.	(Portugal) Ricardo Luiz	Decision (Unanimous)	3	3:00	2017 KLF 70 kg World Championship Qualifying Tournament 4 Semi-finals B
Kickboxing 70 kg	(China) Wu Xuesong	def.	(Mexico) Jose Ruelas	KO (Punch)	2	1:31	2017 KLF 70 kg World Championship Qualifying Tournament 4 Semi-finals A
Kickboxing 60 kg	(China) Gong Yankun	def.	(China) Feng Junshuai	Decision (Unanimous)	3	3:00	
Kickboxing 65 kg	(China) Pan Jiayun	def.	(China) Feng Zhiqiang	KO (Spinning Back Kick)	1	1:33	

== Kunlun Fight MMA 10 ==
Kunlun Fight MMA 10
- Promotion: Kunlun Fight
- Date: April 10, 2017
- Venue: Kunlun Fight World Combat Sports Center
- City: Beijing, China

Event chronology
Kunlun Fight 59	Kunlun Fight MMA 10	Kunlun Fight 60

Kunlun Fight MMA 10 was a mixed martial arts event held by Kunlun Fight on April 10, 2017, at the Kunlun Fight World Combat Sports Center in Beijing, China.

=== Results ===
Kunlun Fight MMA 10
Weight Class				Method	Round	Time	Notes
MMA 84 kg	(China) Wang Sai	def.	(Canada) James Kouame	Decision (Unanimous)	3	5:00	KLF MMA Middleweight Championship
MMA 57 kg	(China) Heqin Lin	def.	(Ukraine) Hanna Yurchenkova	TKO (Punches)	1	3:45	Female Bout
MMA 61 kg	(Spain) J. Francisco Vinuela	def.	(China) Guangfu Chu	TKO (Punches)	1	1:47	
MMA 120 kg	(Russia) Bozigit Ataev	def.	(United States) Jeremy May	TKO (Punches)	1	2:15	
MMA 66 kg	(China) Song Yadong	def.	(Latvia) Edgars Skrīvers	Decision (Unanimous)	3	5:00	

== Kunlun Fight 60 ==
Kunlun Fight 60
- Promotion: Kunlun Fight
- Date: April 23, 2017
- Venue: Honghuagang Sports Center
- City: Guizhou, China

Event chronology
Kunlun Fight MMA 10	Kunlun Fight 60	Kunlun Fight MMA 11

Kunlun Fight 60 was a kickboxing event held by Kunlun Fight on April 23, 2017 at the Honghuagang Sports Center in Guizhou, China.

=== Results ===
Fight Card
Weight Class				Method	Round	Notes
Kickboxing 61.5 kg	(China) Wang Kehan	def.	(Brazil) Juliana Werner	TKO	2	Female 61.5 kg 2016 Tournament Semifinal
Kickboxing 70 kg	(Russia) Artem Pashporin	def.	(Thailand) Jomthong Chuwattana	Decision	3	70 kg Qualifier Tournament 7 Final
Kickboxing 72 kg	(China) Kong Lingfeng	def.	(Thailand) Nongsai	Decision	3	
Kickboxing 67 kg	(China) Gu Hui	def.	(Thailand) Saemapetch Fairtex	Decision	3	
Kickboxing 70 kg	(Thailand) Jomthong Chuwattana	def.	(China) Li Zhuangzhuang	KO	1	70 kg Qualifier Tournament 7 Semifinal
Kickboxing 70 kg	(Russia) Artem Pashporin	def.	(Japan) Yuichiro Nagashima	TKO	2	70 kg Qualifier Tournament 7 Semifinal
Kickboxing 70 kg	(Russia) Ruslan Ataev	def.	(China) Zhao Yan	TKO	2	70 kg Qualifier Tournament Reserve Fight
Kickboxing 70 kg	(Ukraine) Vitali Dubina	def.	(China) Guo Dechao	KO	1	70 kg Qualifier Tournament Reserve Fight
Kickboxing 65 kg	(Portugal) Antonio Freitas	def.	(China) Lin Qiangbang	Decision	3	
Kickboxing 70 kg	(Belarus) Dzianis Zuev	def.	(China) Liu Lei	TKO	1	70 kg Qualifier Tournament 6 Final
Kickboxing 77 kg	(China) Zhang Yang	def.	(Tajikistan) Artem Egorov	TKO	2	
Kickboxing 80 kg	(Ukraine) Artur Kyshenko	def.	(Belgium) Zakaria Baitar	TKO	2	
Kickboxing 70 kg	(China) Liu Lei	def.	(Netherlands) Khalid Raiss	KO	2	70 kg Qualifier Tournament 6 Semifinal
Kickboxing 70 kg	(Belarus) Dzianis Zuev	def.	(Thailand) Arthit Hanchana	KO	3	70 kg Qualifier Tournament 6 Semifinal
Kickboxing 65 kg	(China) He Biao	def.	(China) Hu Zheng	Decision	3	
Kickboxing 56 kg	(Australia) Claire Foreman	def.	(China) Zhang Meng	Decision	3	
Kickboxing 63.5 kg	(China) Sun Zhixiang	def.	(Thailand) Suarek Rukkukamui	Decision	3	
Kickboxing 70 kg	(China) Zhang Yifan	def.	(China) Tang Guoliang	Decision	3	

== Kunlun Fight MMA 11 ==
Kunlun Fight MMA 11
- Promotion: Kunlun Fight
- Date: May 4, 2017
- Venue: Jining High-Tech Zone Stadium
- City: Shandong, China

Event chronology
Kunlun Fight 60	Kunlun Fight MMA 11	Kunlun Fight 61

Kunlun Fight MMA 11 was a mixed martial arts event held by Kunlun Fight on May 4, 2017 at the Jining High-Tech Zone Stadium in Shandong, China.

== Kunlun Fight 61 ==
Kunlun Fight 61
- Promotion: Kunlun Fight
- Date: May 14, 2017
- Venue: Mangrove Tree International Conference Center
- City: Sanya, Hainan, China

Event chronology
Kunlun Fight MMA 11	Kunlun Fight 61	Kunlun Fight MMA 12

Kunlun Fight 61 was a kickboxing event held by Kunlun Fight on May 14, 2017 at the Mangrove Tree International Conference Center in Sanya, Hainan, China.

=== Results ===
Fight Card
Weight Class				Method	Round	Notes
Kickboxing 70 kg	(Thailand) Yodsanklai Fairtex	def.	(Japan) Miyakoshi Soichiro	Decision	3	70 kg Qualifier Tournament 8 Semifinal
Kickboxing 65 kg	(China) Wang Kehan	def.	(Belgium) Anke Van Gestel	Decision (Extra-round)	4	
Kickboxing 65 kg	(China) Pan Jiayun	def.	(Thailand) Wanchaloem	Decision	3	
Kickboxing 63.5 kg	(Brazil) Julio Lobo	def.	(China) Li Yuankun	Decision	3	
Kickboxing 70 kg	(Thailand) Yodsanklai Fairtex	def.	(Suriname) Cedric Manhoef	Decision	3	70 kg Qualifier Tournament 9 Semifinal
Kickboxing 70 kg	(Japan) Miyakoshi Soichiro	def.	(Brazil) Robson Minotinho	TKO	3	70 kg Qualifier Tournament 9 Semifinal
Kickboxing 70 kg	(China) Zhang Dezheng	def.	(Russia) Sayfullah Hambakhadov	Decision	3	70 kg Qualifier Tournament 8 Final
Kickboxing 65 kg	(China) Wei Ninghui	def.	(Brazil) Hector Santiago	Decision	3	
Muay Thai 61 kg	(Hong Kong) Wu Jingcong	def.	(Japan) Takuma	Decision	4	
Kickboxing 65 kg	(Japan) Miyakoshi Keijiro	def.	(China) Bai Lishuai	Decision	3	
Kickboxing 70 kg	(Russia) Sayfullah Hambakhadov	def.	(Netherlands) William Diender	Decision	3	70 kg Qualifier Tournament 8 Semifinal
Kickboxing 70 kg	(China) Zhang Dezheng	def.	(Sweden) Kriss Talingngam	Decision	3	70 kg Qualifier Tournament 8 Semifinal
Kickboxing 70 kg	(China) Deng Li	def.	(France) Giovanni Boyer	Decision	3	70 kg Qualifier Tournament Reserve Fight
Kickboxing 61 kg	(China) Wang Wenfeng	def.	(Russia) Vladimir Lytkin	KO	1	
Kickboxing 61.5 kg	(France) Laëtitia Madjene	def.	(Netherlands) Anissa Haddaoui	Decision	3	Female 61.5 kg 2016 Tournament Semifinal
Kickboxing 60 kg	(China) Li Shuaihu	def.	(Italy) Michael Garaffo	KO	1	
Kickboxing 72 kg	(China) Bubigere	def.	(China) Long Pengyu	TKO	2	

== Kunlun Fight MMA 12 ==
Kunlun Fight MMA 12
- Promotion: Kunlun Fight
- Date: June 1, 2017
- Venue: Lake Park
- City: Dolon Nor, China

Event chronology
Kunlun Fight 61	Kunlun Fight MMA 12	Kunlun Fight 62

Kunlun Fight MMA 12 was a mixed martial arts event held by Kunlun Fight on June 1, 2017 at Lake Park in Dolon Nor, China.

== Kunlun Fight 62 ==
Kunlun Fight 62
- Promotion: Kunlun Fight
- Date: June 10, 2017
- Venue: Workpoint Studios
- City: Bangkok, Thailand

Event chronology
Kunlun Fight MMA 12	Kunlun Fight 62	Kunlun Fight 63

Kunlun Fight 62 was a kickboxing event held by Kunlun Fight on June 10, 2017 at the Workpoint Studios in Bangkok, Thailand.

=== Results ===
Fight Card
Weight Class				Method	Round	Notes
Kickboxing 70 kg	(Thailand) Buakaw Banchamek	def.	(China) Kong Lingfeng	Decision	3	
Kickboxing 70 kg	(Thailand) Superbon Banchamek	def.	(Russia) Artem Pashporin	Decision	3	
Kickboxing 66 kg	(Thailand) Singdam Kiatmuu9	def.	(China) Gu Hui	Decision	3	
Kickboxing 70 kg	(Thailand) Jomthong Chuwattana	def.	(Peru) Gabriel Mazzetti	Decision	3	
Kickboxing 65 kg	(Thailand) Kompetch Fairtex	def.	(China) Wei Ninghui	Decision	3	
Kickboxing 70 kg	(France) Yohann Drai	def.	(Czech Republic) Martin Gano	Decision	3	70 kg Qualifier Tournament 11 Final
Kickboxing 70 kg	(Belarus) Dzianis Zuev	def.	(Spain) Elam Chavez	Decision	3	
Kickboxing 80 kg	(Germany) Ramon Kubler	def.	(China) Bo Fufan	KO	3	
Kickboxing 80 kg	(Ukraine) Artur Kyshenko	def.	(Italy) Gabriele Casella	Decision	3	
Kickboxing 77 kg	(Belarus) Vitaly Gurkov	def.	(China) Nuerla Mulali	Decision	3	
Kickboxing 70 kg	(Czech Republic) Martin Gano	def.	(China) Wu Xuesong	Decision	3	70 kg Qualifier Tournament 11 Semifinal
Kickboxing 70 kg	(France) Yohann Drai	def.	(China) Elias Emam Muhammat	Decision	3	70 kg Qualifier Tournament 11 Semifinal
Kickboxing 70 kg	(Ukraine) Sergey Kulyaba	def.	(Australia) Victor Nagbe	Decision	3	70 kg Qualifier Tournament 10 Final
Muay Thai 60 kg	(China) Han Zihao	def.	(Japan) Shogo Kuriaki	KO	2	
Kickboxing 61.5 kg	(Canada) Denis Puric	def.	(Hong Kong) Yu Wansheng	KO	2	
Kickboxing 72.5 kg	(Ukraine) Vasily Sorokin	def.	(China) Ma Shuo	Decision	3	
Kickboxing 63.5 kg	(China) Lin Qiangbang	def.	(Japan) Nobutoshi Kondo	Decision	3	
Kickboxing 70 kg	(Ukraine) Sergey Kulyaba	def.	(China) Tian Xin	Decision	3	70 kg Qualifier Tournament 10 Semifinal
Kickboxing 70 kg	(Australia) Victor Nagbe	def.	(Russia) Armen Israelyan	Decision	3	70 kg Qualifier Tournament 10 Semifinal

== Kunlun Fight 63 ==
Kunlun Fight 63
- Promotion: Kunlun Fight
- Date: June 24, 2017
- Venue: Mangrove Tree International Conference Center
- City: Sanya, Hainan, China

Event chronology
Kunlun Fight 62	Kunlun Fight 63	Kunlun Fight MMA 13

Kunlun Fight 63 was a kickboxing event held by Kunlun Fight on June 24, 2017 at the Mangrove Tree International Conference Center in Sanya, Hainan, China.

=== Results ===
Fight Card
Weight Class				Method	Round	Notes
Kickboxing 70 kg	(Democratic Republic of the Congo) Nayanesh Ayman	def.	(China) Hua Xu	TKO	2	70 kg Qualifier Tournament 13 Final
Kickboxing 75 kg	(Azerbaijan) Alim Nabiev	def.	(China) Zhang Yang	Decision	3	
Kickboxing 70 kg	(Morocco) Marouan Toutouh	def.	(Georgia (country)) Davit Kiria	Decision	3	
Kickboxing 90 kg	(China) Zhou Wei	def.	(Iran) Amir Inanloo	Decision	3	
Kickboxing 67 kg	(China) Zhang Chunyu	def.	(Japan) Matsui Yuma	Decision	3	
Kickboxing 88 kg	(China) Yang Yu	def.	(Canada) Olivier Fairtex	KO	2	
Kickboxing 70 kg	(China) Hua Xu	def.	(Romania) Daniel Danut	Decision	3	70 kg Qualifier Tournament 13 Semifinal
Kickboxing 70 kg	(Democratic Republic of the Congo) Nayanesh Ayman	def.	(China) Deng Li	TKO	3	70 kg Qualifier Tournament 13 Semifinal
Kickboxing 70 kg	(Iran) Masoud Minaei	def.	(China) Li Shiyuan	Decision	3	70 kg Qualifier Tournament 12 Final
Kickboxing 100+ kg	(Japan) Jairo Kusunoki	def.	(China) Asihati	Decision (Extra-round)	4	
Kickboxing 85 kg	(China) Sun Yang	def.	(Iran) Mehdad Kavand	KO	1	
Muay Thai 80 kg	(China) Zhao Cun	def.	(France) Dimitri Gaeran	TKO	2	
Kickboxing 70 kg	(Iran) Masoud Minaei	def.	(South Africa) Warren Stevelmans	Decision	3	70 kg Qualifier Tournament 12 Semifinal
Kickboxing 70 kg	(China) Li Shiyuan	def.	(England) Elliot Compton	TKO	2	70 kg Qualifier Tournament 12 Semifinal
Kickboxing 60 kg	(China) Jiao Daobo	def.	(Ukraine) Trishin Constantine	Decision	3	
Kickboxing 70 kg	(China) Zhang Wensheng	def.	(China) Zhu Baotong	Decision	3	Reserve Fight
Kickboxing 62 kg	(Thailand) Anucha Toomtam	def.	(China) Gong Yuankun	KO	2	
Kickboxing 62 kg	(China) Liang Yi	def.	(China) Ruo Dan	Decision	3	
Kickboxing 67 kg	(China) Yang Biao	def.	(China) Kang Guiming	Decision	3	

== Kunlun Fight MMA 13 ==
Kunlun Fight MMA 13
- Promotion: Kunlun Fight
- Date: July 6, 2017
- Venue: Mangrove Tree Resort
- City: Qingdao, China

Event chronology
Kunlun Fight 63	Kunlun Fight MMA 13	Kunlun Fight 64

Kunlun Fight MMA 13 was a mixed martial arts event held by Kunlun Fight on July 6, 2017 at the Mangrove Tree Resort in Qingdao, China.

== Kunlun Fight 64 ==
Kunlun Fight 64
- Promotion: Kunlun Fight
- Date: July 15, 2017
- Venue: Jiangnan Stadium
- City: Chongqing, China

Event chronology
Kunlun Fight MMA 13	Kunlun Fight 64	Kunlun Fight 65

Kunlun Fight 64 was a kickboxing event held by Kunlun Fight on July 15, 2017 at the Jiangnan Stadium in Chongqing, China.

=== Results ===
Fight Card
Weight Class				Method	Round	Notes
Kickboxing 61.5 kg	(Netherlands) Anissa Haddaoui	def.	(China) Wang Kehan	Decision (Extra-round - Unanimous)	4	Female 61.5 kg 2016 Tournament Final
Kickboxing 70 kg	(Thailand) Jomthong Chuwattana	def.	(Japan) Takuya Imamura	TKO	2	70 kg Qualifier Tournament 15 Final
Kickboxing 67 kg	(Japan) Kenta Yamada	def.	(China) Jia Aoqi	TKO	2	
Kickboxing 100+ kg	(Belarus) Pyotr Romankeich	def.	(China) Jia Weichao	KO	1	
Kickboxing 65 kg	(China) Sun Zhixiang	def.	(Morocco) Amine Ahmidouch	Decision (Unanimous)	3	
Kickboxing 70 kg	(Thailand) Jomthong Chuwattana	def.	(Suriname) Cedric Manhoef	Decision (Extra-round - Unanimous)	4	70 kg Qualifier Tournament 15 Semifinal
Kickboxing 70 kg	(Japan) Takuya Imamura	def.	(China) Kong Lingfeng	TKO	2	70 kg Qualifier Tournament 15 Semifinal
Kickboxing 70 kg	(China) Feng Xingli	def.	(Netherlands) Fernando Groenhart	KO	1	70 kg Qualifier Tournament 14 Final
Kickboxing 61.5 kg	(China) Lin Qiangbang	def.	(Thailand) Saipetch Ponjaroen	Decision (Unanimous)	3	
Kickboxing 80 kg	(China) Li Baoming	def.	(Brazil) Vinicius Dionisio	Decision (Unanimous)	3	
Kickboxing 52.5 kg	(China) Chang Ningning	def.	(China) Xu Yi	Decision (Unanimous)	3	
Kickboxing 61.5 kg	(China) Wang Wenfeng	def.	(Georgia (country)) Jano Partsvania	Decision (Unanimous)	3	
Kickboxing 70 kg	(Netherlands) Fernando Groenhart	def.	(Armenia) Arman Hambaryan	TKO	1	70 kg Qualifier Tournament 14 Semifinal
Kickboxing 70 kg	(China) Feng Xingli	def.	(Poland) Lukasz Plawecki	Decision (Split)	3	70 kg Qualifier Tournament 14 Semifinal
Kickboxing 65 kg	(China) Feng Lei	def.	(Austria) Sasa Jovanovich	Decision (Majority)	3	
Kickboxing 65 kg	(China) Hu Zheng	def.	(China) Jin Jincheng	Decision	3	
Kickboxing 65 kg	(China) Wang Yiwen	def.	(China) Zhang Meng	Decision	3	
Kickboxing 56 kg	(China) Zhao Wenwen	def.	(China) Lu Hongwei	TKO	3	

== Kunlun Fight 65 ==
Kunlun Fight 65
- Promotion: Kunlun Fight
- Date: August 27, 2017
- Venue: Mangrove Resort German Village Square
- City: Qingdao, China

Event chronology
Kunlun Fight 64	Kunlun Fight 65	Kunlun Fight 65

Kunlun Fight 65 was a kickboxing event held by Kunlun Fight on August 27, 2017 at the Mangrove Resort German Village Square in Qingdao, China.

=== Results ===
Fight Card
Weight Class				Method	Round	Notes
Kickboxing 70 kg	(Thailand) Superbon Banchamek	def.	(Democratic Republic of the Congo) Nayanesh Ayman	Decision	1	2017 70 kg Tournament Final 16
Kickboxing 70 kg	(Armenia) Marat Grigorian	def.	(Thailand) Jomthong Chuwattana	KO	1	2017 70 kg Tournament Final 16
Kickboxing 70 kg	(Georgia (country)) Davit Kiria	def.	(Morocco) Marouan Toutouh	Decision	3	2017 70 kg Tournament Final 16
Kickboxing 70 kg	(Belarus) Dzianis Zuev	def.	(China) Feng Xingli	TKO	2	2017 70 kg Tournament Final 16
Kickboxing 70 kg	(Morocco) Mohamed Mezouari	def.	(Russia) Artem Pashporin	TKO	1	2017 70 kg Tournament Final 16
Kickboxing 70 kg	(France) Yohann Drai	def.	(China) Zhang Dezheng	Decision	3	2017 70 kg Tournament Final 16
Kickboxing 70 kg	(Ukraine) Sergey Kulyaba	def.	(Belarus) Andrei Kulebin	Decision (Extra-round)	4	2017 70 kg Tournament Final 16
Kickboxing 70 kg	(Slovakia) Nikola Cimesa	def.	(China) Tian Xin	Decision	3	2017 70 kg Tournament Final 16
Kickboxing 66 kg	(Morocco) Ilias Bulaid	def.	(Brazil) Jordan Kranio	KO	1	2017 66 kg Tournament Final 16
Kickboxing 66 kg	(China) Wei Ninghui	def.	(Portugal) Jairon Ortega	KO	2	2017 66 kg Tournament Final 16
Kickboxing 66 kg	(Thailand) Singdam Kiatmuu9	def.	(Belgium) Ali Makhi	Decision	3	2017 66 kg Tournament Final 16
Kickboxing 66 kg	(China) Gu Hui	def.	(Spain) David Ruiz	Decision	3	2017 66 kg Tournament Final 16
Kickboxing 66 kg	(Thailand) Petchtanong Banchamek	def.	(Japan) Yuya Yamato	Decision	3	2017 66 kg Tournament Final 16
Kickboxing 66 kg	(China) Yang Zhuo	def.	(Japan) Kenta Yamada	Decision	3	2017 66 kg Tournament Final 16
Kickboxing 66 kg	(Colombia) David Mejia	def.	(France) Mohamed Galaoui	Decision	3	2017 66 kg Tournament Final 16
Kickboxing 66 kg	(Russia) Takhmasib Kerimov	def.	(China) Geng Quanyao	KO	1	2017 66 kg Tournament Final 16
Kickboxing 70 kg	(Brazil) Robson Minotinho	def.	(China) Zhao Junchen	Decision	3	70 kg Tournament Reserve Fight
Kickboxing 70 kg	(China) Zhu Baotong	def.	(China) Zhao Wenwen	Decision	3	70 kg Tournament Reserve Fight
Kickboxing 66 kg	(Canada) Will Romero	def.	(China) He Biao	Decision	3	66 kg Tournament Reserve Fight
Kickboxing 66 kg	(China) Chu Han	def.	(Iran) Abdollah Anizh	Decision	3	66 kg Tournament Reserve Fight

== Kunlun Fight MMA 14 ==
Kunlun Fight MMA 14
- Promotion: Kunlun Fight
- Date: August 28, 2017
- Venue: Mangrove Resort German Village Square
- City: Qingdao, China

Event chronology
Kunlun Fight 64	Kunlun Fight MMA 14	Kunlun Fight MMA 15

Kunlun Fight MMA 14 was a mixed martial arts event held by Kunlun Fight on August 28, 2017 at the Mangrove Resort German Village Square in Qingdao, China.

== Kunlun Fight MMA 15 ==
Kunlun Fight MMA 15
- Promotion: Kunlun Fight
- Date: October 3, 2017
- Venue: Alxa Dream Park
- City: Alxa, China

Event chronology
Kunlun Fight MMA 14	Kunlun Fight MMA 15	Kunlun Fight MMA 16

Kunlun Fight MMA 15 was a mixed martial arts event held by Kunlun Fight on October 3, 2017 at the Alxa Dream Park in Alxa, China.

== Kunlun Fight MMA 16 ==
Kunlun Fight MMA 16
- Promotion: Kunlun Fight
- Date: October 28, 2017
- Venue: Melbourne Pavilion
- City: Melbourne, Australia

Event chronology
Kunlun Fight MMA 15	Kunlun Fight MMA 16	Kunlun Fight 66

Kunlun Fight MMA 16 was a mixed martial arts event held by Kunlun Fight on October 28, 2017 at the Melbourne Pavilion in Melbourne, Australia.

== Kunlun Fight 66 ==
Kunlun Fight 66
- Promotion: Kunlun Fight
- Date: November 5, 2017
- Venue: Optics Valley International Tennis Center
- City: Wuhan, China

Event chronology
Kunlun Fight MMA 16	Kunlun Fight 66	Kunlun Fight 67

Kunlun Fight 66 was a kickboxing event held by Kunlun Fight on November 5, 2017 at the Optics Valley International Tennis Center in Wuhan, China.

=== Results ===
Fight Card
Weight Class				Method	Round	Notes
Kickboxing 75 kg	(Belarus) Vitaly Gurkov	def.	(Iran) Hossein Karimi	Decision	3	75 kg Tournament Final
Kickboxing 72.5 kg	(Netherlands) Albert Kraus	def.	(China) Li Zhuangzhuang	Decision	3	
Kickboxing 88 kg	(China) Yang Yu	def.	(Serbia) Denis Marjanovic	Decision	3	
Kickboxing 90 kg	(China) Guo Wenjie	def.	(Iran) Touraj Karimi	KO	1	
Kickboxing 61.5 kg	(Thailand) Saeksan Or. Kwanmuang	def.	(China) Wang Wenfeng	Decision	3	61.5 kg Tournament Final
Kickboxing 75 kg	(Belarus) Vitaly Gurkov	def.	(Thailand) Arthit Hanchana	TKO	3	75 kg Tournament Semifinal
Kickboxing 75 kg	(China) Xu Yongba	def.	(France) Mohamed Diaby	Decision	3	75 kg Tournament Semifinal
Kickboxing 75 kg	(Iran) Hossein Karimi	def.	(China) Gao Xiang	Decision	3	75 kg Tournament Reserve Fight
Kickboxing 61.5 kg	(China) Wang Wanben	def.	(Brazil) Hector Santiago	Decision	3	61.5 kg Tournament Reserve Fight
Kickboxing 61.5 kg	(Thailand) Saeksan Or. Kwanmuang	def.	(China) Jiao Daobo	Decision	3	61.5 kg Tournament Semifinal
Kickboxing 61.5 kg	(China) Wang Wenfeng	def.	(China) Lin Qiangbang	Decision	3	61.5 kg Tournament Semifinal
Kickboxing 75 kg	(Thailand) Arthit Hanchana	def.	(Portugal) Diogo Calado	Decision	3	75 kg Tournament Quarterfinal
Kickboxing 75 kg	(Belarus) Vitaly Gurkov	def.	(China) Nuerla Mulali	Decision	3	75 kg Tournament Quarterfinal
Kickboxing 75 kg	(France) Mohamed Diaby	def.	(Hong Kong) Law Chosing	Decision	3	75 kg Tournament Quarterfinal
Kickboxing 75 kg	(China) Xu Yongba	def.	(Slovakia) Marko Milanovic	TKO	1	75 kg Tournament Quarterfinal
Kickboxing 61.5 kg	(Thailand) Saeksan Or. Kwanmuang	def.	(China) Yang Guang	Decision	3	61.5 kg Tournament Quarterfinal
Kickboxing 61.5 kg	(China) Jiao Daobo	def.	(Canada) Denis Puric	Decision (Extra-round)	4	61.5 kg Tournament Quarterfinal
Kickboxing 61.5 kg	(China) Lin Qiangbang	def.	(United States) Joe Gogo	Decision	3	61.5 kg Tournament Quarterfinal
Kickboxing 61.5 kg	(China) Wang Wenfeng	def.	(Netherlands) Ilias Ennahachi	Decision	3	61.5 kg Tournament Quarterfinal
Kickboxing 60 kg	(Brazil) Fabrício Andrade	def.	(China) Zhang Hua	KO	2	

== Kunlun Fight 67 ==
Kunlun Fight 67
- Promotion: Kunlun Fight
- Date: November 12, 2017
- Venue: {{{venue}}}
- City: Sanya, Hainan, China

Event chronology
Kunlun Fight 66	Kunlun Fight 67	Kunlun Fight 68

Kunlun Fight 67 was a kickboxing event held by Kunlun Fight on November 12, 2017 at the Mangrove Resort German Village Square in Sanya, Hainan, China.

=== Results ===
Fight Card
Weight Class				Method	Round	Notes
Kickboxing 70 kg	(Thailand) Buakaw Banchamek	def.	(Morocco) Marouan Toutouh	KO	2	
Kickboxing 66 kg	(China) Yang Zhuo	def.	(Thailand) Singdam Kiatmuu9	Decision	3	66 kg Tournament Final
Kickboxing 80 kg	(China) Bo Fufan	def.	(Germany) Ramon Kubler	Decision	3	
Kickboxing 70 kg	(Thailand) Superbon Banchamek	def.	(Georgia (country)) Davit Kiria	Decision	3	70 kg Tournament Quarterfinal
Kickboxing 70 kg	(Armenia) Marat Grigorian	def.	(Morocco) Mohamed Mezouari	Decision	3	70 kg Tournament Quarterfinal
Kickboxing 70 kg	(China) Kong Lingfeng	def.	(Thailand) Apidej	Decision	3	70 kg Tournament Reserve Fight
Kickboxing 66 kg	(Thailand) Singdam Kiatmuu9	def.	(China) Pan Jiayun	Decision	3	66 kg Tournament Semifinal
Kickboxing 66 kg	(China) Yang Zhuo	def.	(Colombia) David Mejia	Decision	3	66 kg Tournament Semifinal
Kickboxing 70 kg	(Australia) Victor Nagbe	def.	(China) Wu Xuesong	TKO	2	70 kg Tournament Reserve Fight
Kickboxing 70 kg	(Belarus) Dzianis Zuev	def.	(France) Yohann Drai	Decision	3	70 kg Tournament Quarterfinal
Kickboxing 70 kg	(Ukraine) Sergey Kulyaba	def.	(Serbia) Nikola Cimesa	Decision	3	70 kg Tournament Quarterfinal
Kickboxing 66 kg	(China) Yang Zhuo	def.	(China) Wei Ninghui	Decision	3	66 kg Tournament Quarterfinal
Kickboxing 66 kg	(Morocco) Ilias Bulaid	def.	(Thailand) Petchtanong Banchamek	Decision	3	66 kg Tournament Quarterfinal
Kickboxing 66 kg	(Colombia) David Mejia	def.	(China) Sun Zhixiang	KO	2	66 kg Tournament Quarterfinal
Kickboxing 66 kg	(Thailand) Singdam Kiatmuu9	def.	(Russia) Takhmasib Kerimov	Decision	3	66 kg Tournament Quarterfinal
Kickboxing 70 kg	(Japan) Miyakoshi Soichiro	def.	(China) Hua Xu	Decision	3	70 kg Tournament Reserve Fight
Kickboxing 66 kg	(China) Pan Jiayun	def.	(China) Wu Kangle	KO	1	66 kg Tournament Reserve Fight
Kickboxing 66 kg	(China) Bai Lishuai	def.	(China) Hu Zheng	Decision	3	66 kg Tournament Reserve Fight

== Kunlun Fight 68 ==
Kunlun Fight 68
- Promotion: Kunlun Fight
- Date: December 17, 2017
- Venue: Honghuagang Sport Center
- City: Zunyi, China

Event chronology
Kunlun Fight 67	Kunlun Fight 68	Kunlun Fight 69

Kunlun Fight 68 was a kickboxing event held by Kunlun Fight on December 17, 2017 at the Honghuagang Sport Center in Zunyi, China.

=== Results ===
Fight Card
Weight Class				Method	Round	Notes
Kickboxing 52.5 kg	(China) Guan Acui	def.	(China) Zhang Weili	Decision	3	Female 52.5 kg Tournament Final
Kickboxing 90 kg	(Latvia) Artur Gorlov	def.	(China) Guo Wenjie	Decision	3	
Kickboxing 76 kg	(China) Nuerla Mulali	def.	(Thailand) Aikpracha Meenayothin	Decision	3	
Kickboxing 70 kg	(China) Zhu Baotong	def.	(Iran) Ali Bani	Decision	3	
Kickboxing 52.5 kg	(China) Zhang Weili	def.	(China) Chang Ningning	Decision	3	Female 52.5 kg Tournament Semifinal
Kickboxing 52.5 kg	(China) Guan Acui	def.	(China) Xu Yi	Decision	3	Female 52.5 kg Tournament Semifinal
Kickboxing 63 kg	(China) Wang Kehan	def.	(Italy) Paola Cappucci	Decision	3	
Kickboxing 85 kg	(Ukraine) Artur Kyshenko	def.	(Russia) Andrey Chekhonin	TKO	1	
Kickboxing 100+ kg	(Ukraine) Roman Kryklia	def.	(China) Ning Tianshuai	TKO	1	Heavyweight Tournament Quarterfinal
Kickboxing 100+ kg	(Brazil) Felipe Micheletti	def.	(China) Liu Junchao	KO	1	Heavyweight Tournament Quarterfinal
Kickboxing 100+ kg	(Iran) Iraj Azizpour	def.	(China) Ye Xiang	Decision (Extra-round)	4	Heavyweight Tournament Quarterfinal
Kickboxing 100+ kg	(China) Asihati	def.	(Japan) Jairo Kusunoki	KO	1	Heavyweight Tournament Quarterfinal
Kickboxing 70 kg	(China) Sun Shuwei	vs.	(China) Zhang Yifan	NC	1	
Kickboxing 52.5 kg	(China) Chang Ningning	def.	(Italy) Debora Vacirca	Decision	3	Female 52.5 kg Tournament Quarterfinal
Kickboxing 52.5 kg	(China) Zhang Weili	def.	(Australia) Alma Juniku	Decision	3	Female 52.5 kg Tournament Quarterfinal
Kickboxing 52.5 kg	(China) Guan Acui	def.	(Brazil) Elaine Lopes	Decision	3	Female 52.5 kg Tournament Quarterfinal
Kickboxing 52.5 kg	(China) Xu Yi	def.	(United States) Magalie Alvarez	Decision	3	Female 52.5 kg Tournament Quarterfinal
Kickboxing 63 kg	(China) Chen Jinwang	def.	(China) Huang Dongbo	Decision	3	

== See also ==
- List of Kunlun Fight events
- 2017 in Glory
- 2017 in Glory of Heroes
- 2017 in Wu Lin Feng
