= Wang Kehan =

Chinese kickboxer

- Born: 汪柯菡; 15 November 1995 (age 30); Mudanjiang, China
- Nickname: Chaoqi
- Nationality: Chinese
- Height: 1.74 m (5 ft 8 1/2 in)
- Weight: 62 kg (137 lb; 9 st 11 lb)
- Division: Bantamweight; Super Bantamweight; Lightweight
- Style: Sanda, Kickboxing
- Stance: Orthodox
- Fighting out of: Barcelona, Spain
- Team: Kyshenko PRO Team
- Trainer: Artur Kyshenko
- Years active: 2012 - present

Kickboxing record
- Total: 35
- Wins: 33
- By knockout: 14
- Losses: 2

Other information
- University: Zhengzhou University

Wang Kehan (born 15 November 1995) is a Chinese Sanda kickboxer, who has spent the majority of her career fighting under the banner of Kunlun Fight in her native China.

Between July 2018 and April 2019 she was ranked #6 woman in the world and #5 between June 2019 and March 2020 by Combat Press. Combat Press has continually ranked her in the top ten since ranking her #4 in November 2016, before dropping her from the rankings in April 2020 due to inactivity.

She is the former IPCC Muay Thai World Champion, WCK Muay Thai and Wu Lin Feng Muay Thai Champion.

== Background ==
Wang;s martial arts career began in 2005, when she began training Wushu Sanda. In 2010 she began training with the national team, but suffered an injury in 2012, which sidelined her for the remainder of the year. After a successful recovery, she decided to transition to kickboxing.

== Kickboxing career ==
In 2013, Wang fought against Ekaterina Vandaryeva during C3: King of Fighters. She won the fight in the third round by TKO.

After dropping an extra round decision to Jemyma Betrian, she scored a decision win over Marloes Merza and a TKO win over Taina. She would then enter the WCK Super Bantamweight tournament. Wang TKOed Lindsay Ball in the semi-finals, and won a unanimous decision over Ciara Irvine to win her first major title.

In her next fight she faced Masha Valent during Kunlun Fight 10. She won by a tornado kick to clinch the IPCC Muay Thai title.

In the following fight Wang fought Emily Wahby for the WLF 60 kg World Title. She won a unanimous decision, to win her third title in a row.

Over the next two years, Wang won her next 7 fights in a row, with notable wins over Irina Mazepa and Vicky Church. She then entered the Mulan 51.5 kg Tournament. In the quarter-finals she beat Juliana Werner by a 2nd-round TKO. In the semi-finals she beat Anke Van Gestel by a unanimous decision after an extra round. In the finals she fought Anissa Haddaoui, and lost a unanimous decision, after an extra round.

After losing in the finals of the tournament, Wang went on a four fight winning streak, with notable wins over Laëtitia Madjene and Mallaury Kalachnikoff.

== Championships and accomplishments ==
- International Professional Combat Council
  - IPCC Muay Thai Bantamweight World Championship (59 kg)
- World Championship Muay Thai
  - WCK Super Bantamweight World Championship
- Wu Ling Fen
  - WLF Muay Thai Bantamweight World Championship
- Kunlun Fight
  - Kunlun Fight Mulan 61.5 kg Mulan Tournament Runner up

== Kickboxing record ==
Kickboxing record
33 wins (14 KOs), 2 losses, 0 draw
Date	Result	Opponent	Event	Location	Method	Round	Time	Record
22 Oct 2018	Win	(France) Mallaury Kalachnikoff	Kunlun Fight 78	Tongling, China	Decision (Majority)	3	3:00	33-2
13 May 2018	Win	(France) Aurélie Froment	Kunlun Fight 74	Jinan, China	Decision (Unanimous)	3	3:00	32-2
11 Mar 2018	Win	(France) Laëtitia Madjene	Kunlun Fight 70	Sanya, Hainan, China	Decision (Unanimous)	3	3:00	31-2
17 Dec 2017	Win	(Italy) Paola Cappucci	Kunlun Fight 68	Sanya, China	Decision (Unanimous)	3	3:00	30-2
15 May 2017	Loss	(Morocco) Anissa Haddaoui	Kunlun Fight 64	Chongqing, China	Decision (Ext. Round)	4	3:00	29-2
Mulan 61.5 kg Tournament Final.
14 May 2017	Win	(Belgium) Anke Van Gestel	Kunlun Fight 61	Sanya, Hainan, China	Decision (Ext. Round)	4	3:00	29-1
Mulan 61.5 kg Tournament Semi-final.
23 Apr 2017	Win	(Brazil) Juliana Werner	Kunlun Fight 60	Guizhou, China	TKO	2	?	28-1
Mulan 61.5 kg Tournament Quarter-final.
30 Oct 2016	Win	(Greece) Korina Papachrysanthou	Kunlun Fight 54	Wuhan, China	TKO (Punches)	1	?	27-1
10 Sep 2016	Win	(Belgium) Nathalie Visschers	Kunlun Fight 51	Fuzhou, China	TKO (Punches)	3	?	26-1
5 Jun 2016	Win	(Indonesia) Shana Lammers	Kunlun Fight 45	Chengdu, China	TKO (Punches)	2	?	25-1
26 Apr 2016	Win	(Netherlands) Rachel Adamus	Kunlun Fight 43	Zhoukou, China	TKO (Punches)	3	?	24-1
23 Jan 2016	Win	(Portugal) Marisa Pires	Kunlun Fight 37	Sanya, China	TKO (Punches)	2	?	23-1
30 Nov 2015	Win	(England) Vicky Church	WCK Muay Thai: USA vs China	Las Vegas, Nevada, United States	TKO (Punches)	2	?	22-1
28 Oct 2015	Win	(Germany) Michaela Michl	Kunlun Fight 32	Dazhou, China	Decision (Unanimous)	3	3:00	21-1
3 Jan 2015	Win	(Russia) Irina Mazepa	Kunlun Fight 15	Nanjing, China	Decision (Unanimous)	3	3:00	20-1
4 Dec 2014	Win	(Italy) Emily Wahby	Kunlun Fight 14	Bangkok, Thailand	Decision (Unanimous)	3	3:00	19-1
For the WLF 60 kg World Title.
13 Sep 2014	Win	(Belarus) Masha Valent	Kunlun Fight 10	Minsk, Belarus	KO (Tornado Kick)	3	?	18-1
For the IPCC Muay Thai title.
7 Jun 2014	Win	(United States) Ciara Irvine	WCK Muay Thai	Temecula, California, United States	Decision (Unanimous)	3	?	17-1
WCK Super Bantamweight Tournament Final.
7 Jun 2014	Win	(Canada) Lindsay Ball	WCK Muay Thai	Temecula, California, United States	TKO	2	2:55	16-1
WCK Super Bantamweight Tournament Semi-final.
27 Apr 2014	Win	(Brazil) Taina	Kunlun Fight 4	Manila, Philippines	TKO (Punches)	3	?	15-1
30 Mar 2014	Win	(Netherlands) Marloes Merza	Kunlun Fight 3	Harbin, China	Decision (Unanimous)	3	3:00	14-1
18 Jan 2014	Loss	(Netherlands) Jemyma Betrian	Wu Lin Feng	Hubei, China	Decision (Etr. Round)	4	3:00	13-1
3 May 2013	Win	(Belarus) Ekaterina Vandaryeva	C3: King of Fighters	Xichang, China	TKO (Punches)	3	?	13-0
Legend: Win Loss Draw/No contest Notes

== See also ==
- List of female kickboxers
