= Laëtitia Madjene =

French kickboxer

- Born: 28 August 1986 (age 40); Montpellier, France
- Nickname: Miss Dynamite
- Nationality: French
- Height: 1.71 m (5 ft 7 1/2 in)
- Weight: 63 kg (139 lb; 9 st 13 lb)
- Division: Featherweight
- Style: Kickboxing
- Stance: Orthodox
- Team: Dynamite Center
- Trainer: Michel Garcia
- Years active: 2014-present

Kickboxing record
- Total: 32
- Wins: 27
- By knockout: 5
- Losses: 4
- By knockout: 0
- No contests: 1

Other information
- Occupation: Trainer at Dynamite Center

Laëtitia Madjene (born 28 August 1986) is a French kickboxer and the current WKN Lightweight champion. At an amateur level, she was the 2015 WAKO Welterweight Lowkick world champion and the WAKO Irish Open Tournament winner.

== Kickboxing career ==
In 2015, Madjene participated in the 2015 WAKO World Amateur Championship. After winning by KO against Yildrim in quarter finals and Veronika Cmárová in the semi-finals, she faced Kseniia Miroshichenko in the finals. Madjene won the fight by a unanimous decision.

In 2017, she fought in the Kunlun Fight Mulan Tournament. She won a unanimous decision over Anissa Haddaoui in the semi-finals. She would pull out of the fight due to an injury. She was replaced by Haddaoui.

The fight with Wang Kehan was rebooked for Kunlun Fight 69. and was subsequently rebooked for Kunlun Fight 70 after Madjene pulled out with an injury. Kehan won the fight by a unanimous decision.

During Fight Night Saint Tropez 6 Madjene fought Mallaury Kalachnikoff for the WKN Lightweight title. Madjene won a unanimous decision.

== Championships and accomplishments ==
=== Amateur titles ===
- World Association of Kickboxing Organizations
  - WAKO Irish Open Tournament Winner
  - WAKO World Full Contact Welterweight Championship

=== Professional titles ===
- World Kickboxing Network
  - WKN World K1 Lightweight Championship

== Kickboxing record ==
Kickboxing record
27 Wins (5 (T)KOs), 4 Losses, 1 No Contest
Date	Result	Opponent	Event	Location	Method	Round	Time
4 Aug 2018	Win	(France) Mallaury Kalachnikoff	Fight Night Saint-Tropez	Saint-Tropez, France	Decision (Unanimous)	3	3:00
Wins the WKN World K1 Lightweight title.
11 Mar 2018	Loss	(China) Wang Kehan	Kunlun Fight 70	Sanya, China	Decision (Unanimous)	3	3:00
14 May 2017	Win	(Netherlands) Anissa Haddaoui	Kunlun Fight 61	Sanya, China	Decision (Unanimous)	3	3:00
Kunlun Fight Mulan Tournament Semi-finals.
30 Oct 2016	Win	(Canada) Candice Mitchell	Kunlun Fight 54	Wuhan, China	Decision (Unanimous)	3	3:00
4 June 2016	Win	(France) Marlene Caneva	18e Nuit des Titans	Saint-André-les-Vergers, France	TKO	1	3:00
19 May 2016	Win	(France) Nawel Karouach	Capital Fights	Paris, France	Decision (Unanimous)	3	3:00
21 Jan 2016	Win	(France) Laurie Catherin	MFC 3	Seyssins, France	Decision (Unanimous)	3	3:00
3 Apr 2015	Win	(France) Aurélie Froment	La Nuit des Défis III	Béziers, France	Decision (Unanimous)	3	3:00
6 Dec 2014	Win	(England) M. Bellod	Full Night VIII	Tokyo, Japan	TKO (Punches)	2	3:00
Legend: Win Loss Draw/No contest Notes

Amateur Kickboxing record
Date	Result	Opponent	Event	Location	Method	Round	Time
5 Mar 2017	Loss	(Germany) Julia Irmen	Irish Open, Tournament Final	Dublin, Ireland	Decision	3	3:00
Won the 2017 Irish Open Silver Medal.
4 Mar 2017	Win	(Finland) Jenna Puurunen	Irish Open, Tournament Semifinal	Dublin, Ireland	Decision	3	3:00
3 Mar 2017	Win	(Norway) Andrea Sigersvold	Irish Open, Tournament Quarterfinal	Dublin, Ireland	Decision	3	3:00
28 Nov 2015	Win	(Russia) Kseniia Miroshichenko	WAKO World Championship, Tournament Final	Dublin, Ireland	Decision	3	3:00
Won the 2015 WAKO World Gold Medal.
27 Nov 2015	Win	(Slovakia) Veronika Cmárová	WAKO World Championship, Tournament Semifinal	Dublin, Ireland	Decision	3	3:00
26 Nov 2015	Win	(Turkey) D. Yildrim	WAKO World Championship, Tournament Quarterfinal	Dublin, Ireland	KO	2	3:00
8 May 2016	Win	(France) P David	French National Championship, Tournament Final	Paris, France	TKO	2	
Won the 2016 French National K-1 title.
2 May 2016	Win	(France) Charlotte Pelte	French National Championship, Tournament Semifinal	Paris, France	TKO (Retirement)	2	3:00
8 Mar 2015	Win	(Norway) E. Vade	WAKO Irish Open, Tournament Final	Dublin, Ireland	Decision	3	3:00
Won the 2015 WAKO Irish Open Gold Medal.
7 Mar 2015	Win	(Poland) Paulina Frankowska	WAKO Irish Open, Tournament Semifinal	Dublin, Ireland	Decision	3	3:00
7 Mar 2015	Win	(United States) Amanda Ginski	WAKO Irish Open, Tournament Quarterfinals	Dublin, Ireland	Decision	3	3:00
2 Nov 2014	Win	(France) Laëticia Gaydon	French National Championship, Tournament Final	Paris, France	Decision (Unanimous)	3	2:00
Won the 2014 French National K-1 title.
20 Apr 2014	Win	(France) Laëticia Gaydon	French National Cup, Tournament Final	Paris, France	Decision (Unanimous)	3	2:00
Won the 2014 French National K-1 Cup title.
5 Nov 2013	Loss	(France) Sarah Surrel	French National Championship, Tournament Final	Paris, France	Decision (Unanimous)	3	2:00
For the 2013 French National K-1 title.
Legend: Win Loss Draw/No contest Notes

== See also ==
List of female kickboxers
