= Mallaury Kalachnikoff =

French kickboxer

- Born: 13 April 1997 (age 29); Puget-sur-Argens, France
- Nickname: "The Warrior Angel"
- Nationality: French
- Height: 1.70 m (5 ft 7 in).
- Weight: 61 kg (134 lb; 9 st 8 lb)
- Division: Bantamweight
- Style: Kickboxing
- Stance: Orthodox
- Fighting out of: Saint-Raphaël, Var, France
- Team: AJSR Saint Raphael
- Trainer: Badri Rouabhia
- Years active: 2016 - present

Kickboxing record
- Total: 38
- Wins: 28
- By knockout: 1
- Losses: 10

Mallaury Kalachnikoff-Lakli (born 13 April 1997) is a French kickboxer who has been professionally competing since 2016. She is the reigning WAKO Welterweight World Champion, the reigning WKN Lightweight European champion, and the former FFKMDA Bantamweight Champion.

She is the winner of the Girl Power Lightweight tournament, and runner up of the Girl Power Featherweight tournament.

At the amateur level, she was the WAKO 2014 World kickboxing champion at 65 kg, and the French amateur kickboxing champion for three years in a row (2014, 2015 and 2016).

== Kickboxing career ==
Mallaury Kalachnikoff participated in the second season of the Girl Power tournament, with the WKN Lightweight belt being the tournament prize. All fights took place on the same night, with eight participants. In the quarter-finals Kalachnikoff beat Judit Laura Foldvari. In the semi-finals she defeated Marina Spasić. In the final bout she won a unanimous decision against Nathalie Visschers to become the WKN (World Kickboxing Network) European Champion.

In her next fight, during Cavalaire Kickboxing Show 2, she won a unanimous decision against Sara Surrel to win the FFKMDA French title.

Kalachnikoff defended her WKN European title against Tereza Dvorakova in September 2017, winning a unanimous decision.

In February 2018, Kalachnikoff entered the fifth edition of the Girl Power tournament, fighting for the WKN Bantamweight title. She defeated Monika Babić in the quarter-final and won the rematch against Tereza Dvorakova in the semi-finals, but lost to Irem Akim in the final match

In June 2018, Kalachnikoff fought Teodora Manić for the WAKO kickboxing world welterweight title. She managed to win a close split decision.

In her next fight she contested the WKN World Lightweight title against the reigning champion, Laëtitia Madjene. Kalachnikoff would end up losing a unanimous decision.

During BFS 1 Kalachnikoff was scheduled to defend her WKN European title for the second time, against Katarzyna Jaworska. She won a unanimous decision.

In December 2019, she fought Sarel de Jong in a super fight between the reigning Enfusion and WAKO champions, as a replacement for Amel Dehby. She lost a unanimous decision.

Kalachnikoff was scheduled to face Christelle Barbot at Nuit Des Championes 2021. She lost the fight by decision.

== Championships and accomplishments ==
=== Amateur titles ===
- World Association of Kickboxing Organizations
  - (gold) 2018 WAKO Junior World Championship 65 kg

=== Professional titles ===
- Girl Power
  - Girl Power Season 2: Lightweight Tournament Winner
  - Girl Power Season 5: Featherweight Tournament Runner-up
- World Kickboxing Network
  - WKN European Lightweight Championship (62 kg)
    - Two successful title defenses
- Fédération Française de Kick Boxing, Muaythaï et Disciplines Associées
  - FFKMDA Bantamweight French Championship (63.5 kg)
- World Association of Kickboxing Organizations
  - WAKO K1 Welterweight World Championship (62 kg)

== Kickboxing record ==
Kickboxing record
28 wins (1 KOs), 10 losses
Date	Result	Opponent	Event	Location	Method	Round	Time	Record
2022-07-11	Loss	(Belgium) Kelly Danioko	Battle of Saint Raphaël 8	Saint-Raphaël, France	Decision	3	3:00	28-10
2021-11-20	Loss	(France) Christelle Barbot	Nuit Des Championes 2021	Marseille, France	Decision	3	3:00	28-9
2020-03-07	Win	(France) Elsa Hemat	Au Non Des Femmes	Paris, France	Decision (Unanimous)	3	3:00	28-8
2019-12-06	Loss	(Netherlands) Sarel de Jong	Enfusion 91	Abu Dhabi, United Arab Emirates	Decision (Unanimous)	5	3:00	27-8
2019-09-14	Win	(Germany) Michaela Michl	Battle Of Saint-Raphael 7	Saint-Raphaël, Var, France	Decision (Unanimous)	3	3:00	27-7
2019-05-18	Loss	(France) Maurine Atef	Master Fight	Chalon-sur-Saône, France	Decision (Unanimous)	3	3:00	26-7
2019-03-30	Win	(Poland) Katarzyna Jaworska	BFS 1	Nimes, France	Decision (Unanimous)	3	3:00	26-6
Retained the WKN European Lightweight title.
2018-10-22	Loss	(China) Wang Kehan	Kunlun Fight 78	Tongling, China	Decision (Unanimous)	5	3:00	25-6
2018-09-15	Loss	(Turkey) Irem Akim	Battle Of Saint-Raphael 6	Saint-Raphaël, Var, France	Decision (Unanimous)	3	3:00	25-5
2018-08-04	Loss	(France) Laëtitia Madjene	Fight Night Saint-Tropez	Saint-Tropez, France	Decision (Unanimous)	3	3:00	25-4
For the WKN World Lightweight title.
2018-06-30	Win	(Serbia) Teodora Manić	Monte-Carlo Fighting Trophy	Monaco, Monaco	Decision (Split)	5	3:00	25-3
Wins the WAKO World Welterweight title.
2018-05-12	Loss	(France) Nora Cornolle	Partouche Kickboxing Tour	Hyères, France	Decision (Unanimous)	3	3:00	24-3
2018-02-09	Loss	(Turkey) Irem Akim	Girl Power 5, Tournament Finals	Stara Zagora, Bulgaria	Decision (Unanimous)	3	3:00	24-2
For the WKN Featherweight World Title.
2018-02-09	Win	(Czech Republic) Tereza Dvorakova	Girl Power 5, Tournament Semifinal	Stara Zagora, Bulgaria	Decision (Unanimous)	3	3:00	24-1
2018-02-09	Win	(Croatia) Monika Babić	Girl Power 5, Tournament Quarterfinal	Stara Zagora, Bulgaria	Decision (Unanimous)	3	3:00	23-1
2017-09-09	Win	(Czech Republic) Tereza Dvorakova	Battle Of Saint-Raphael	Saint-Raphaël, Var, France	Decision (Unanimous)	5	3:00	22-1
Retained the WKN European title.
2017-08-04	Win	(Serbia) Marina Spasić	Fight Night 5	Saint-Tropez, France	Decision (Unanimous)	5	3:00	21-1
2017-06-30	Win	(Italy) Chiara Vincis	Monte-Carlo Fighting Trophy 1	Monaco, Monaco	KO	1	3:00	20-1
2017-06-03	Win	(France) Sara Surrel	Cavalaire Kickboxing Show 2	Cavalaire-sur-Mer, France	Decision (Unanimous)	5	3:00	19-1
Wins the FFKMDA Bantamweight title.
2017-02-10	Win	(Belgium) Nathalie Visschers	Girl Power 2, Tournament Finals	Stara Zagora, Bulgaria	Decision (Unanimous)	5	3:00	18-1
Wins the WKN European title.
2017-02-10	Win	(Serbia) Marina Spasić	Girl Power 2, Tournament Semifinals	Stara Zagora, Bulgaria	Decision (Unanimous)	3	3:00	17-1
2017-02-10	Win	(Hungary) Judit Laura Foldvari	Girl Power 2, Tournament Quarterfinals	Stara Zagora, Bulgaria	Decision (Unanimous)	3	3:00	16-1
2016-12-03	Loss	(France) Nora Cornolle	Road To Duel	Paris, France	Decision (Unanimous)	3	3:00	15-1
2016-09-17	Loss	(Slovenia) Ivana Miklasova	Battle Of Saint-Raphael 4	Saint-Raphaël, Var, France	Decision (Unanimous)	3	3:00	15-0
Legend: Win Loss Draw/No contest Notes

== See also ==
List of female kickboxers
