= John Sharp (referee) =

Australian mixed martial arts referee

John "Sharpie" Sharp is an Australian mixed martial arts referee in the Ultimate Fighting Championship.

One of the most experienced referees to emerge from Australia, Sharp has worked on UFC events since 2010 and officiated on the Asian series of The Ultimate Fighter.

== Early career ==
Sharp first refereed at Cage Fighting Championship 8, in Sydney, Australia, in 2009 and is a regular on the local Australian MMA scene.

== Ultimate Fighting Championship ==
In 2010 Sharp officiated at UFC 110 on 20 February, in Sydney, Australia. After his loss to Krzysztof Soszynski, Stephan Bonnar was critical of Sharp's decision.

Sharp has continued to referee Australian and Asian UFC events. In 2013, he travelled to Macau for The Ultimate Fighter: China.
