= The Ultimate Fighter: China =

UFC mixed martial arts television series and event in 2014

- Genre: Reality, Sports
- Created by: Frank Fertitta III, Lorenzo Fertitta, Dana White
- Starring: Dana White, Cung Le, Tiequan Zhang, Hailin Ao
- Country of origin: China

Production
- Running time: 60 minutes

Original release
- Network: Liaoning Satellite TV
- Release: December 7, 2013 – January 6, 2014

The Ultimate Fighter: China is an international installment of the Ultimate Fighting Championship (UFC)-produced reality television series The Ultimate Fighter. It is the fourth season produced outside the United States and the first to air in China, on Liaoning Television starting December 7, 2013.

UFC officially announced the season in June 2013. Tryouts were held in July and August 2013 in Beijing, Singapore and Macao. Fighters were looked at in the featherweight, lightweight and welterweight divisions, with over 150 applicants. The featherweight and welterweight classes were ultimately chosen. Sixteen fighters competed in two single-elimination tournaments. The final bouts aired live on March 1, 2014. Vietnamese-American Cung Le was the show's mentor and chief coach. UFC fighter Tiequan Zhang and Chinese mixed martial artist Hailin Ao coached the two teams.

== Cast ==
=== Chief staff ===
- Cung Le, mentor and chief coach
- Scott Sheeley, assistant coach

=== Coaches ===
Team Sky Dragons

- Tiequan Zhang, Head coach
- Bao Li Gao, Sanda coach
- Vince Soberano, Muay Thai coach
- Flavio Bueno, jiu jitsu coach

Team Flying Lions

- Hailin Ao, head coach (Episodes 1–4)
- An Hu, Sanda coach
- Marco Machado, jiu jitsu coach
- Fred Thomassen, assistant coach
- Scott Sheeley, assistant coach (Episode 5-)
- Alexander Gustafsson, guest coach

=== Fighters ===
- Team Sky Dragons
  - Featherweights: Ning Guangyou, Fu Changxin, Yao Zhikui, and He Jianwei.
  - Welterweights: Zhang Lipeng, Albert Cheng, Wu Qize, and Li Jinying*.

*Li quit on episode 2. He was replaced by Fu Ziyi.

- Team Flying Lions
  - Featherweights: Yang Jianping, Rocky Lee, Allen Chong, and Shih Liang.
  - Welterweights: Wang Sai, Wang Anying, Zhu Qingxiang, and Dong Xin*.

*Dong was replaced by Yong Shun on episode 5 due to injury.

=== Referees ===
- John Sharp

== Episodes ==
There will be a total of 12 episodes aired on Liaoning Satellite TV, for Season 1. Each episode is one hour long (including advertisements), with a short commentary (less than 10 minutes) following directly after the episode. TUF: China is scheduled to air every Saturday at 22:00 Beijing Time, and beginning January 2014, it will air every Saturday and Sunday, consecutively (also at the same time). The series will end on January 26, 2014.

Episode 1: Premiere (December 7, 2013)

- The episode starts with an explanation about the UFC and the Ultimate Fighter (for those who are not familiar with it).
- The coaches enter the Ultimate Fighter training center; first one is Tiequan Zhang and then Hailin Ao. Cung Le shows up and explain them the goals of this season of the Ultimate Fighter.
- The fighters check the training center by themselves and start training with some equipment. The coaches arrive and explain them what the UFC is and also remind them of how important this opportunity is for the history of MMA in China and Asia.
- Preliminary training matches are held to gauge each fighter's strengths and weaknesses in order to determine the fighter picks made for the two teams: Team Sky Dragons and Team Flying Lions (led by Tiequan Zhang and Hailin Ao, respectively).
- Team Sky Dragons and Team Flying Lions then picked teams and Le flipped a coin (red for the Sky Dragons, yellow for the Flying Lions). Ao won the coin toss and opted to choose the first fighter.
- Featherweight selection:

Team	1st Pick	2nd Pick	3rd Pick	4th Pick
Flying Lions	Yang Jianping	Rocky Lee	Allen Chong	Shih Liang
Sky Dragons	Ning Guangyou	Fu Changxin	Yao Zhikui	He Jianwei

- Welterweight selection:

Team	1st Pick	2nd Pick	3rd Pick	4th Pick
Flying Lions	Wang Sai	Wang Anying	Zhu Qingxiang	Dong Xin
Sky Dragons	Zhang Lipeng	Albert Cheng	Wu Qize	Li Jinying

- Le announces that fighters could receive $25,000 for Knockout of the Season, Submission of the Season and Fight of the Season.
- The teams visit their locker rooms and Le visits both of them to remind the teams of focusing on developing together during the season.

Episode 2: (December 14, 2013)

- The fighters from Team Flying Lions arrive at the house and explore the different bedrooms while they decide which one they should choose. In Team Sky Dragons' van ride to the House, Li Jinying talks about being a guy only used to fitness and that he joined MMA after seeing the fighters in magazines. His teammates tell him that they will help him adjust to the MMA life. He also discusses being the last pick of the team.
- Team Sky Dragons finally arrive at the house and they start interacting with the other fighters.
- During the training session of the Sky Dragons, Li reveals it was his first training and that he could not do anything but defend himself. Back in the house he discusses with a teammate who would choose to fight him and he's told that he should focus on developing his game and not letting the others know his weaknesses as they have the fight pick and they'll try to avoid his fight as long as possible.
- In their next session, Li still struggles with training and is unable to throw or take strikes. Cung Le is not satisfied with what he sees and the coaches discuss Li's future. Le challenges him to stay by doing two 3-minute rounds, but Li says he cannot do it because of his relationships with his teammates. Le tells him to choose one of the coaches then.
- After being easily dominated by Le's assistant coach Scott Sheeley, Li decides to quit. Le says that this is the best decision and that they will decide between the alternates who will replace him.
- Team Flying Lions finally starts training and Ao discusses how important it is to train every aspect of the game and with that they will be ready for the fights. He also introduces his coaching staff for the show.
- Le meets with Fu Ziyi and tells him that he's on the show as a replacement. He is very excited to be there and Zhang welcomes him.
- The first match-up is chosen by Tiequan Zhang: Team Sky Dragons' Zhang Lipeng vs. Team Flying Lions' Zhu Qingxiang. During the square off, Zhu pushed Zhang away.
- Coach Zhang compliments Zhang Lipeng's skills and comprehension to learn. Later, Zhu confesses that he pushed Zhang because he felt uncomfortable during their stare down.
- Zhang Lipeng said that he trained with Hailin Ao in the past and he feels that the coach really wants to see him defeated. He also reflected on how many mistakes he made in his career when he was younger and that now he has a better record and technique.
- Former UFC Lightweight Champion Benson Henderson made a special visit and watched the fight.
- Zhang Lipeng defeated Zhu Qingxiang via submission (punches) in round 1.
- After the fight, Le admitted that he was impressed with the back and forth action, especially because it was the first fight of the season. He praised Zhu's attitude and said he could do well with the right training.
- Zhang chooses the next match-up: Team Sky Dragons' Ning Guangyou vs. Team Flying Lions' Shih Liang.

Episode 3: (December 21, 2013)

- Cung Le and the coaches bring some beer for the fighters while they gather together to watch UFC 166.
- The fight pick from last episode is shown again and both fighters analyze how they should perform to win it. Hailin Ao feels that this will be a good match as Shih likes to strike and Ning prefers to wrestle. Tiequan Zhang also thinks that Ning is a good fighter and he's a good example for the rest of the team because of his commitment to training.
- Ben Henderson helped Team Sky Dragons with some wrestling training and complimented Ning's skills.
- Huang Jianxiang, the show's host, decided to make a prank with Team Sky Dragons. He pretended to be the replacement and welcomed the Flying Lions after their training session.
- Ning and his teammates discuss Shih's skills. Meanwhile, Team Flying Lions writes supportive messages for Shih and help him launch a Kongming lantern.
- During the weigh-in, Chong called out He Jianwei.
- Coach Vince Soberano reveals that Shih was his student for 3 years, and Ning is his student for one year. He is having a hard time watching the fight because of his feelings for both fighters. He goes to the locker room before the fight and does not watch it.
- Ning Guangyou defeated Shih Liang via knockout (punch) in round 2.

Episode 4: (December 28, 2013)

- Zhang chooses the next match-up: Team Sky Dragons' Albert Cheng vs. Team Flying Lions' Dong Xin.
- Hailin Ao visited the house to support his fighters, specially Shih, who lost his fight. He gave them red hot water bottles to play around with in training and warm themselves. The color was specially chosen to pick on the Sky Dragons team.
- Allen Chong believes that Team Sky Dragons probably chose Dong because he lacks jiu jitsu skills to compete against Cheng.
- Before the weigh-in, Team Flying Lions was uncomfortable with Ao's absence. After the weigh-in, Le brought them to their locker room and revealed that Ao had to leave the show for personal reasons. Therefore, the three assistant coaches are now responsible for making the decisions together.
- Dong Xin defeated Albert Cheng via TKO (punches) in round 2.

Episode 5: (January 4, 2014)

- Dong Xin enters the training center along with coach An Hu. Cung Le is waiting there with a doctor, whom explains to Dong that the results of his exams after his fight revealed a broken hand. He will be unable to continue training and fighting for the rest of the show. His teammates give him support and Le mentions that he will recommend him to fight in the live finale. After Dong leaves, Le mentions that his assistant Scott Sheeley will help them with training and will be in their corner. He will only work with them and won't interact with Team Sky Dragons' training.
- An chooses the next match-up: Team Flying Lions' Yang Jianping vs. Team Sky Dragons' Fu Changxin.
- Le welcomes Dong's replacement Yong Shun to Team Flying Lions. He mentions later that he doesn't know anything about him and he noticed that he is a very quiet person. It is not revealed if he will enter directly to the semi-finals or if he will have to fight before.
- Fu mentions that he wanted to fight Yang because of Yang's big experience as a fighter, while Yang mentions that he wanted Fu because he's not a strong fighter. He also says that he admires Fu's courage during the fight pick to raise his hand as a sign to fight him.
- Team Sky Dragons shows up with a special cake to celebrate He Jianwei's birthday.
- Famous actor Daniel Wu made a special visit and watched the fight.
- Yang Jianping defeated Fu Changxin via submission (armbar) in round 1.

Episode 6: (January 5, 2014)

- Fu Ziyi reveals that he wants to fight Wang Sai next because of Wang's fame around Chinese MMA and that he just wants to challenge himself. He mentions that being in the octagon is worth even being beaten by Wang.
- Wang Sai says that he knows the other team watches videos from the fighters of him team to discover weaknesses, but he believes that he barely has weaknesses and it will be hard for them to find out.
- Fu mentions that he never received such amount of professional training since he was 20 years old (He is 35 now). Later, some scenes reveal that he was cutting weight already. even though the next fight was not announced. He says that this might be the last chance of his life and that he will fight regardless of how he is feeling.
- An chooses the next match-up: Team Flying Lions' Wang Sai vs. Team Sky Dragons' Wu Qize. Fu seems to be surprised that he wasn't picked to fight now. Tiequan Zhang said that they were worried about Fu's weight and they made him cut weight because of that. He also says that he's surprised with the fight pick.
- Wang decides to joke around with the other fighters by wearing a red shirt and pretend he's fighting his own teammates in the house. Some of the other fighters believe that his behavior sometimes is annoying.
- Wu reveals that he already faced Wang in the past and what his opponent does not know is that he exercised a lot ever since and have made great progress. He says he is relaxed and the pressure is on Wang to perform due to being more famous than him.
- Team Flying Lions made a prank on Team Sky Dragons' locker room with pink balloons and other pink objects.
- Wang heard that Wu's skills are better now than they were 2 or 3 years ago when they trained together and he hopes that's true so he can face a better opponent in the octagon and show his abilities.
- Wang Sai defeated Wu Qize via TKO (strikes) in round 2.
- The coaches praised the fight, specially Wu's "warrior's heart". Cung Le agrees with them and also points out that this fight was an example that the fighters are learning what they have been taught.

Episode 7: (January 11, 2014)

- Cung Le calls a meeting with both teams to reveal he was informed of someone from Team Flying Lions that went to their old hotel to pick up a package. He asks if the person who did it will step up and reveal himself for the rest of cast. Wang reveals that he went there to get his sports drink.
- Le says that it takes a lot to step up and admit it, but that it is not all that he knows. He shows an iPhone and asks who owns it. Yang Jianping raises his hand.
- During a confessional, Yang said that being away from everything is hard and he brought his phone so he could keep in touch with the outside world. He admitted it was his fault because they signed a confidentiality agreement before joining the house.
- Back to the current moment, Le says a punishment is required for this situation and then shifts the fight pick to the hands of Team Sky Dragons.
- Shih Liang reveals that it was Allen Chong that told someone from the other team about this secret and then that person reported it to one of the coaches, whom informed Le of the fact.
- In the locker room, the team is arguing about keeping their secrets to themselves and Chong feels that they are blaming him for the incident. He replied during a confessional that he is only playing by the rules, while other people are not.
- Wu Qize's teammates lifted him up when he got back to the house. He says that this shows they really are a team and all of his teammates praise his efforts in his fight. Wang Sai also went there to compliment him.
- Zhang chooses the next match-up: Team Sky Dragons' Yao Zhikui vs. Team Flying Lions' Allen Chong.
- Chong decides not to do heavy training along with the other fighters because he still has an injured neck and will fight within a day or two, so he prefers to tread lightly.
- Inside the van, Wang and Yang have an argument after something Wang said about Yang that the latter did not like. Back in the house, An Hu tries to talk with both of them and revert the bad situation.
- Chong teammates think he has little chance of winning the fight because he is only good at jiu-jitsu. Later, he talks briefly about Malaysia's culture when it comes to fighting and struggles when he remembers his wife back home. Sheeley agrees to corner him for this fight and help him, though he confesses later that he wished Chong trained more the last days but he understands some of the reasons that Chong told them.
- Fu Ziyi mentions that he is struggling with weight cut and he doesn't have enough energy to cut it for his fight in a few days. He decides to keep trying after Tiequan Zhang shows him some support.
- Yao Zhikui defeated Allen Chong via knockout (strikes) in round 1.

Episode 8: (January 12, 2014)

- The fighters from Team Sky Dragons had a problem with their weight scale and tried to get the other team's borrowed. After they were denied, some of them decide to search Team Flying Lion's locker room for it. Fu Ziyi manages to find the other team's scale and borrow it secretly.
- Fu is still struggling to cut weight and thinks about quitting. Cung Le advises him not to do it because it would take a toll on his career. Fu decides to keep trying. Later though Le reveals that Fu won't be able to make weight and the UFC wants him to be removed from the show. They will decide whether he will be replaced by an alternate or someone from his team. Fu says goodbye to his teammates and leaves. Le goes to the other team's locker room and gives them the news. Wang Anying says that he will fight anybody, but he feels that is unfair to cut weight and not fight.
- Le calls a meeting at the training center to announce that Wang Anying will advance directly to the semi-finals and Yong Shun will face Albert Cheng for Dong Xin's spot. Wang Anying feels good about advancing directly though he feels that it's not a good thing to advance without the experience of a first fight.
- Yong feels worried because he wasn't prepared to fight right now as Wang Anying was already going to fight. Meanwhile, Tiequan Zhang decides to show a video of Cheng's girlfriend to him as a special motivation for his fight.
- Le brings UFC light heavyweight Alexander Gustafsson to Team Flying Lions' training and he helps them with takedown defense.
- Albert Cheng defeated Yong Shun via submission (strikes) in round 2.
- During the fight, Yong grabbed the cage deliberately in two moments and received a one-point deduction.

Episode 9: (January 18, 2014)

- The last featherweight fight of the first round is announced: Team Sky Dragons' He Jianwei vs. Team Flying Lions' Rocky Lee.
- A doctor checks Lee's calf after he complained of pain in that area during training and thinks that he might have torn his muscle. He gives Lee some medicine and advises him to put some ice on it so it heals faster.
- Both teams have a chance to relax and take part in a bowling challenge with every participant bowling one round and later the coaches for the final round. Team Sky Dragons wins and punishes the other team with the task of walking around with a bowling ball between their legs back and forth.
- After a sparing session with Zhang Lipeng, Cung Le compliments his skills and desire to learn, also stating that he is the most well rounded welterweight in the season.
- Rocky Lee defeated He Jianwei via submission (armbar) in round 1.

Episode 10: (January 19, 2014)

- This episode is a recap of all the fights and events leading up to the semi-finals.

Episode 11: (January 25, 2014)

- The first semi final matchups for both weight classes are announced: Wang Sai vs. Wang Anying and Yang Jianping vs. Yao Zhikui. To the fighters' surprise, the welterweight tournament will feature teammates matchups in the semifinals.
- Concerned about an injured hand, Wang Sai prefers to avoid a visit to the hospital as he could find himself removed from his fight due to the injury.
- Wang Sai defeated Wang Anying via submission (rear-naked choke) in round 2.
- Both Yang and Yao reveal their thoughts about each other and their feelings regarding the important fight coming up.
- Yang Jianping defeated Yao Zhikui via unanimous decision in three rounds.

Episode 12 Season End: (January 26, 2014)

- The Coaches' Challenge features a fishing style challenge with both coaches dressed as rikishis. With An Hu's victory, he received $5,000 and each fighter of his team won ¥5,000.
- Zhang Lipeng defeated Albert Cheng via submission (kimura) in round 2.
- During Ning's preparation for his fight against Lee, Chan Sung Jung helped him with takedown defense.
- Ning Guangyou defeated Rocky Lee via knockout (punch) in round 1.
- Le and the coaches celebrate their time together on the show with a special speech and the finalists have a chance to add their photo to the tournament bracket.

== Tournament brackets ==
=== Welterweight bracket ===
Elimination Round
Wu Qize	2
Wang Sai	TKO
Fu Ziyi	-
Wang Anying	*
Zhang Lipeng	SUB
Zhu Qingxiang	1
Albert Cheng	2
Dong Xin	TKO

Semi-finals
Wang Sai	SUB
Wang Anying	2
Zhang Lipeng	SUB
Albert Cheng**	2

Finale
Zhang Lipeng	SD
Wang Sai	3

*Fu was unable to make weight and was removed from the show. Wang Anying advanced directly to the semi-finals.

**Dong was replaced by Yong Shun due to injury. In order to decide who would take Dong's spot in the semi-finals, Yong faced Cheng and lost by submission (punches) in round 2.

=== Featherweight bracket ===
Elimination Round
Fu Changxin	1
Yang Jianping	SUB
Yao Zhikui	KO
Allen Chong	1
Ning Guangyou	KO
Shih Liang	2
He Jianwei	1
Rocky Lee	SUB

Semi-finals
Yang Jianping	UD
Yao Zhikui	3
Ning Guangyou	KO
Rocky Lee	1

Finale
Yang Jianping	3
Ning Guangyou	UD

- The bout between Yang Jianping and Ning Guangyou took place at UFC Fight Night: Bisping vs. Le.

Legend
	Team Sky Dragons
	Team Flying Lions
UD	Unanimous Decision
SD	Split Decision
SUB	Submission
(T)KO	(Technical) Knock Out

== The Ultimate Fighter China Finale: Kim vs. Hathaway ==
The Ultimate Fighter China Finale: Kim vs. Hathaway
- The poster for The Ultimate Fighter China Finale: Kim vs. Hathaway
- Promotion: Ultimate Fighting Championship
- Date: March 1, 2014
- Venue: CotaiArena
- City: Macau, SAR, China
- Attendance: 6,000

Event chronology
UFC 170: Rousey vs. McMann	The Ultimate Fighter China Finale: Kim vs. Hathaway	UFC Fight Night: Gustafsson vs. Manuwa

The Ultimate Fighter China Finale: Kim vs. Hathaway (also known as UFC Fight Night: Kim vs. Hathaway) was a mixed martial arts event held by the Ultimate Fighting Championship. The event took place on March 1, 2014, at the CotaiArena in Macau, SAR, China.

=== Background ===
The event was headlined by a welterweight bout between John Hathaway and Dong Hyun Kim.

Also featured on the card was the welterweight final of The Ultimate Fighter: China. The featherweight final between Ning Guangyou and Jianping Yang was removed from the card due to an injury to Jianping Yang. The bout was rebooked on the UFC Fight Night: Bisping vs. Le card in August 2014.

Zak Cummings was expected to fight Alberto Mina but weighed in 8 pounds over. Mina would not agree to compete at a catch weight, so the bout was scratched from the event. With the removal of Cummings/Mina from the card, the event proceeded with only eight bouts, which is the smallest for the organization since UFC 72 in 2007.

=== Results ===
Main Card (UFC Fight Pass)
Weight class				Method	Round	Time	Notes
Welterweight	Dong Hyun Kim	def.	John Hathaway	KO (spinning elbow)	3	1:02
Welterweight	Zhang Lipeng	def.	Wang Sai	Decision (split) (29–28, 27–30, 29–28)	3	5:00	(Note: The Ultimate Fighter China's Welterweight Tournament Final)
Heavyweight	Matt Mitrione	def.	Shawn Jordan	KO (punches)	1	4:59
Featherweight	Hatsu Hioki	def.	Ivan Menjivar	Decision (unanimous) (29–28, 29–28, 29–28)	3	5:00
Preliminary card (UFC Fight Pass)
Lightweight	Yui Chul Nam	def.	Kazuki Tokudome	Decision (split) (29–27, 27–28, 29–28)	3	5:00
Bantamweight	Vaughan Lee	def.	Nam Phan	Decision (unanimous) (30–27, 30–27, 30–26)	3	5:00
Welterweight	Wang Anying	def.	Albert Cheng	TKO (doctor stoppage)	1	5:00
Featherweight	Mark Eddiva	def.	Zhumabek Tursyn	Decision (unanimous) (30–27, 30–27, 30–27)	3	5:00

=== Bonus awards ===
The following fighters received $50,000 bonuses:

- Fight of the Night: Yui Chul Nam vs. Kazuki Tokudome
- Performance of the Night: Matt Mitrione and Dong Hyun Kim

== See also ==
- The Ultimate Fighter
- List of UFC events
- 2014 in UFC
