= 2015 in Kunlun Fight =

Information
- First date: January 3
- Last date: December 19

Events
- Total events: 24

The year 2015 was the 2nd year in the history of the Kunlun Fight, a kickboxing promotion based in China. 2015 started with Kunlun Fight 15 and ended with Kunlun Fight 35.

The events were broadcasts through television agreements in mainland China with Jiangsu TV and around the world with various other channels. The events were also streamed live on the Kunlun Fight app. Traditionally, most Kunlun Fight events have both tournament fights and superfights (single fights).

== Champions ==
Weight	Name	Event	Date	Notes
MMA Lightweight	(Kazakhstan) Beibit Nazarov def. Bruno Amorim	Kunlun Fight - Cage Fight Series 2	April 4, 2015	MMA Title Fight
MMA Flyweight	(China) Meixuan Zhang def. Kazybek Ashimov	Kunlun Fight 23	April 26, 2015	MMA Title Fight
MMA Lightweight	(Kazakhstan) Beibit Nazarov def. Haotian Wu	Kunlun Fight - Cage Fight Series 3	June 6, 2015	MMA Title Fight
MMA Flyweight	(China) Meixuan Zhang def. Ricky Granstad	Kunlun Fight - Cage Fight Series 3	June 6, 2015	MMA Title Fight
Kickboxing 95+kg	(Netherlands) Jahfarr Wilnis def. Hesdy Gerges (final) def. Asihati (semifinal) def. Roman Kryklia (Quarterfinal) def. Alireza Karbasi (Final 16)	Kunlun Fight 15/Kunlun Fight 21/Kunlun Fight 26	June 23, 2015	2015 95+kg Multi-part 16-man World Championship Tournament
MMA Lightweight	(Kazakhstan) Beibit Nazarov def. Massimo Capusella	Kunlun Fight - Cage Fight Series 4	October 4, 2015	MMA Title Fight
MMA Flyweight	(China) Meixuan Zhang def. Kazybek Ashimov	Kunlun Fight - Cage Fight Series 4	October 4, 2015	MMA Title Fight
Kickboxing 52 kg	(China) E Meidie def. Anissa Meksen (final) def. Isis Verbeek (semifinal) def. Viktoria Palianskaya (quarterfinal)	Kunlun Fight 27/Kunlun Fight 31/Kunlun Fight 32	October 28, 2015	Women's 2015 Legend of Mulan 8-woman World Championship Tournament
Kickboxing 80 kg	(Ukraine) Artur Kyshenko def. Dmitry Valent (final) def. Eyevan Danenberg (semifinal) def. Jonatan Oliveira (Quarterfinal)	Kunlun Fight 23/Kunlun Fight 35	December 19, 2015	2015 80 kg 8-man World Championship Tournament
Kickboxing 60 kg	(China) Cong Wang def. Valentina Shevchenko	Kunlun Fight 33	October 31, 2016	Kickboxing Women's Title Fight
Kickboxing 70 kg	(Thailand) Sitthichai Sitsongpeenong def. Enriko Gogokhia (final) def. Superbon Banchamek (semifinal) def. Marat Grigorian (Quarterfinal) def. Jonay Risco (Final 16) def. Andy Souwer (32) def. Murthel Groenhart (64)	Kunlun Fight 15/Kunlun Fight 31/Kunlun Fight 35/Kunlun Fight 37	January 23, 2016	2015 70 kg Multi-part 64-man World Championship Tournament

== List of events ==
#	Date	Evemt	Venue	Location
38	December 19, 2015	Kunlun Fight 35	Luoyang Stadium	Luoyang, China
37	November 21, 2015	Kunlun Fight 34	Shenzhen Bay Gymnasium	Shenzhen, China
36	October 31, 2015	Kunlun Fight 33	Changde College Sport Hall	Changde, China
35	October 28, 2015	Kunlun Fight 32	Daxian Stadium	Dazhou, China
34	October 4, 2015	Kunlun Fight - Cage Fight Series 4	Saryarka Velodrome	Astana, Kazakhstan
33	September 28, 2015	Kunlun Fight 31	Asiatique	Bangkok, Thailand
32	September 4, 2015	Kunlun Fight 30 / Topking World Series: TK5	Zhoukou Sports Center	Zhoukou, China
31	August 15, 2015	Kunlun Fight 29	Ice Cube Curling Center	Sochi, Russia
30	July 19, 2015	Kunlun Fight 28	Wutaishan Sports Center	Nanjing, China
29	July 18, 2015	Kunlun Fight 27	Wutaishan Sports Center	Nanjing, China
28	June 7, 2015	Kunlun Fight 26	Jiangnan Sports Hall	Chongqing, China
27	June 6, 2015	Kunlun Fight - Cage Fight Series 3	Jiangnan Sports Hall	Chongqing, China
26	May 15, 2015	Kunlun Fight 25	Štiavničkách Sports Hall	(Slovenia) Banská Bystrica, Slovakia
25	May 2, 2015	Kunlun Fight 24	Palaferroli San Bonifacio	Verona, Italy
24	April 26, 2015	Kunlun Fight 23	International Economics College Gymnasium	Changsha, China
23	April 12, 2015	Kunlun Fight 22	Changde College Sport Hall	Changde, China
22	April 4, 2015	Kunlun Fight - Cage Fight Series 2	Baluan Sholak Sports Palace	Almaty, Kazakhstan
21	March 17, 2015	Kunlun Fight 21	Serenity Sanya Marina	Sanya, China
20	March 8, 2015	Kunlun Fight 20	Starlight Park	Beijing, China
19	February 1, 2015	Kunlun Fight 19	Tianhe Stadium	Guangzhou, China
18	January 18, 2015	Kunlun Fight 18	Wutaishan Sports Center	Nanjing, China
17	January 17, 2015	Kunlun Fight 17	Wutaishan Sports Center	Nanjing, China
16	January 4, 2015	Kunlun Fight 16	Nanjing Olympic Sports Center Gymnasium	Nanjing, China
15	January 3, 2015	Kunlun Fight 15	Nanjing Olympic Sports Center Gymnasium	Nanjing, China

== Kunlun Fight 15 ==
Kunlun Fight 15
- Promotion: Kunlun Fight
- Date: January 3, 2015
- Venue: Nanjing Olympic Sports Center Gymnasium
- City: Nanjing, China

Event chronology
Kunlun Fight 14	Kunlun Fight 15	Kunlun Fight 16

Kunlun Fight 15 was a kickboxing event held by Kunlun Fight on January 3, 2015 at the Nanjing Olympic Sports Center Gymnasium in Nanjing, China.

=== Results ===
Fight Card
Weight Class				Method	Round	Notes
100+kg	(China) Asihati		(Japan) Jairo Kusunoki	Decision (unanimous)	3	Super Heavyweight Tournament Final 16
100+kg	(Netherlands) Jahfarr Wilnis	def.	(Iran) Alireza Karbasi	KO	1	Super Heavyweight Tournament Final 16
60 kg	(Thailand) Lerdsila Chumpairtour	def.	(China) Wang Wanben	Decision (unanimous)	3	
100+kg	(United States) Steven Banks	def.	(Russia) Anatoly Yakoviev	Decision (unanimous)	3	Super Heavyweight Tournament Final 16
100+kg	(Ukraine) Roman Kryklia	def.	(Czech Republic) Tomáš Hron	KO	1	Super Heavyweight Tournament Final 16
52 kg	(China) E Meidie	def.	(Japan) Ohama Yoshimi	KO	2	
70 kg	(Thailand) Sitthichai Sitsongpeenong	def.	(Netherlands) Andy Souwer	Decision (unanimous)	3	Group A Final
100+kg	(Belarus) Andrei Gerasimchuk	def.	(Netherlands) Rico Verhoeven	Decision (unanimous)	3	
66 kg	(China) Yang Jianping	def.	(Japan) Taniyana Fumitaka	Decision (unanimous)	3	
60 kg	(China) Wang Kehan	def.	(Russia) Irina Mazepa	Decision (unanimous)	3	
70 kg	(Netherlands) Andy Souwer	def.	(China) Jiao Fukai	TKO	3	Group A Semifinal 2
70 kg	(Thailand) Sitthichai Sitsongpeenong	def.	(Suriname) Murthel Groenhart	KO	3	Group A Semifinal 1
60 kg	(China) Jin Ying	def.	(Italy) Andrea Roberti			
MMA 56 kg	(China) Xiong Jingnan	def.	(Ukraine) Liubov Tiupina	TKO	1	

=== 70kg World Max Group A tournament bracket ===
Semi-finals		Final
(Suriname) Murthel Groenhart	3r.
(Thailand) Sitthichai Sitsongpeenong	KO	(Thailand) Sitthichai Sitsongpeenong	DEC
(Netherlands) Andy Souwer	DEC	(Netherlands) Andy Souwer	3r.
(China) Jiao Fukai	3r.

== Kunlun Fight 16 ==
Kunlun Fight 16
- Promotion: Kunlun Fight
- Date: January 4, 2015
- Venue: Nanjing Olympic Sports Center Gymnasium
- City: Nanjing, China

Event chronology
Kunlun Fight 15	Kunlun Fight 16	Kunlun Fight 17

Kunlun Fight 16 was a kickboxing event held by Kunlun Fight on January 4, 2015 at the Nanjing Olympic Sports Center Gymnasium in Nanjing, China.

=== Results ===
Fight Card
Weight Class				Method	Round	Notes
70 kg	(Romania) Amansio Paraschiv	def.	(China) Kong Lingfeng	KO	2	Group C Final
MMA 61 kg	(Ukraine) Alexey Naumov	def.	(China) Chu Guangfu	Submission	1	
MMA 70 kg	(China) Wu Haotian	def.	(Canada) Matthew Richardson	Submission (punches)	2	
70 kg	(Romania) Amansio Paraschiv	def.	(Spain) David Calvo	KO	2	Group C Semifinal 2
70 kg	(China) Kong Lingfeng	def.	(Uzbekistan) Mansurbek Tolibov	TKO	3	Group C Semifinal 1
70 kg	(China) Zheng Zhaoyu	def.	(Australia) Victor Nagbe	Decision (unanimous)	3	Group B Final
52 kg	(China) Chen Changlin	def.	(China) Hao Jiahao	Decision (unanimous)	3	
75 kg	(South Africa) Vuyisile Colossa	def.	(Netherlands) Duoli Chen	Decision (unanimous)	3	
70 kg	(Australia) Steve Moxon	def.	(Russia) Aikpracha Meenayothin	Decision (extra round)	4	Group B Reserve Fight
70 kg	(Australia) Victor Nagbe	def.	(Iran) Mustafa Rajabi	Decision (unanimous)	3	Group B Semifinal 2
70 kg	(China) Zheng Zhaoyu	def.	(Japan) Nishikawa Tomoyuki	Decision (unanimous)	3	Group B Semifinal 1
70 kg	(Thailand) Changpuak Jetsada Pongtong	vs.	(China) Wang Weihao	DQ	2	

=== 70kg World Max Group B tournament bracket ===
Semi-finals		Final
(Iran) Mustafa Rajabi	3r.
(Australia) Victor Nagbe	DEC	(China) Zheng Zhaoyu	DEC
(China) Zheng Zhaoyu	DEC	(Australia) Victor Nagbe	3r.
(Japan) Nishikawa Tomoyuki	3r.

=== 70kg World Max Group C tournament bracket ===
Semi-finals		Final
(Spain) David Calvo	2r.
(Romania) Amansio Paraschiv	KO	(Romania) Amansio Paraschiv	KO
(China) Kong Lingfeng	TKO	(China) Kong Lingfeng	2r.
(Uzbekistan) Mansurbek Tolibov	3r.

== Kunlun Fight 17 ==
Kunlun Fight 17
- Promotion: Kunlun Fight
- Date: January 17, 2015
- Venue: Wutaishan Sports Center
- City: Nanjing, China

Event chronology
Kunlun Fight 16	Kunlun Fight 17	Kunlun Fight 18

Kunlun Fight 17 was a kickboxing event held by Kunlun Fight on January 17, 2015 at the Wutaishan Sports Center in Nanjing, China.

=== Results ===
Fight Card
Weight Class				Method	Round	Notes
70 kg	(China) Zhang Chunyu	def.	(China) Deng Li	KO	2	Group E Final
70 kg	(China) Wu Xuesong	def.	(China) Zhao Yan	Decision (unanimous)	3	Group D Final
70 kg	(Romania) Claudiu Corbeanu	def.	(China) Yan Xibo	KO	1	
65 kg	(China) Bai Lishuai	def.	(Sweden) Ricky Granstad	Decision	3	
70 kg	(China) Deng Li	def.	(China) Zhang Yansong	Decision (unanimous)	3	Group E Semifinal 2
70 kg	(China) Zhang Chunyu	def.	(China) Mo Zhuangwei	Decision (unanimous)	3	Group E Semifinal 1
70 kg	(China) Wu Xuesong	def.	(China) Liu Mingzhi	Decision (unanimous)	3	Group D Semifinal 2
70 kg	(China) Zhao Yan	def.	(China) Lv Zhengyi	KO	1	Group D Semifinal 1
70 kg	(China) Deng Li	def.	(China) Qiu Zhiyong	Decision (unanimous)	3	Group E Quarterfinal 4
70 kg	(China) Zhang Yansong	def.	(China) Qiu Junchao	TKO	1	Group E Quarterfinal 3
70 kg	(China) Mo Zhuangwei	def.	(China) Chen Guanran	Decision (unanimous)	3	Group E Quarterfinal 2
70 kg	(China) Zhang Chunyu	def.	(China) Yesimuhon	Decision (unanimous)	3	Group E Quarterfinal 1
70 kg	(China) Liu Mingzhi	def.	(China) Bubigere	Decision (unanimous)	3	Group D Quarterfinal 4
70 kg	(China) Wu Xuesong	def.	(China) Pan Hongmin	KO	1	Group D Quarterfinal 3
70 kg	(China) Zhao Yan	def.	(China) Lu Xiangwei	TKO	1	Group D Quarterfinal 2
70 kg	(China) Lv Zhengyi	def.	(China) Pang Hao	Decision (unanimous)	3	Group D Quarterfinal 1

=== 70kg World Max Group D tournament bracket ===
Quarter-finals
(China) Pang Hao	3r.
(China) Lv Zhengyi	DEC
(China) Zhao Yan	DEC
(China) Lu Xiangwei	3r.
(China) Pan Hongmin	3r.
(China) Wu Xuesong	KO
(China) Liu Mingzhi	DEC
(China) Bubigere	3r.

Semi-finals
(China) Zhao Yan	KO
(China) Lv Zhengyi	3r.
(China) Wu Xuesong	DEC
(China) Liu Mingzhi	3r.

Final
(China) Wu Xuesong	DEC
(China) Zhao Yan	3r.

=== 70kg World Max Group E tournament bracket ===
Quarter-finals
(China) Yesimuhon	3r.
(China) Zhang Chunyu	DEC
(China) Mo Zhuangwei	DEC
(China) Chen Guanran	3r.
(China) Qiu Junchao	1r.
(China) Zhang Yansong	KO
(China) Deng Li	DEC
(China) Qiu Zhiyong	3r.

Semi-finals
(China) Zhang Chunyu	DEC
(China) Mo Zhuangwei	3r.
(China) Deng Li	DEC
(China) Zhang Yansong	3r.

Final
(China) Zhang Chunyu	KO
(China) Deng Li	2r.

== Kunlun Fight 18 ==
Kunlun Fight 18
- Promotion: Kunlun Fight
- Date: January 18, 2015
- Venue: Wutaishan Sports Center
- City: Nanjing, China

Event chronology
Kunlun Fight 17	Kunlun Fight 18	Kunlun Fight 19

Kunlun Fight 18 was a mixed martial arts event held by Kunlun Fight on January 18, 2015 at the Wutaishan Sports Center in Nanjing, China.

=== Results ===
Fight Card
Weight Class				Method	Round	Notes
MMA 66 kg	(Kazakhstan) Nurjan Tutkaev	def.	(United States) Emilio Urrutia	KO	2	
MMA 84 kg	(Russia) Kazbek Tigurov	def.	(United States) Musa Conteh	Submission (Rear Naked Choke)	1	
MMA 61 kg	(China) Jumayi Ayideng	def.	(New Zealand) Kai Kara-France	Decision (Unanimous)	3	
MMA 70 kg	(China) Habiti Tuerxunbieke	def.	(Lebanon) Yousef Wehbe	Submission (Armbar)	2	
MMA 61 kg	(China) Tieying Wu	def.	(Malaysia) Mohd Fouzein	TKO (Cut)	3	
MMA 75 kg	(China) Yonghao Xu	def.	(China) Ruochao Sun	KO)	1	
MMA 66 kg	(China) Musu Nuertiebieke	def.	(China) Burigede Alateng	Submission (Armbar)	1	
MMA 61 kg	(Taiwan) Haoyang He	def.	(China) Jun Liu	KO	2	
MMA 61 kg	(China) Muha Li	def.	(China) Man Du	Decision (unanimous)	3	

== Kunlun Fight 19 ==
Kunlun Fight 19
- Promotion: Kunlun Fight
- Date: February 1, 2015
- Venue: Tianhe Stadium
- City: Guangzhou, China

Event chronology
Kunlun Fight 18	Kunlun Fight 19	Kunlun Fight 20

Kunlun Fight 19 was a kickboxing event held by Kunlun Fight on February 1, 2015 at the Tianhe Stadium in Guangzhou, China.

=== Results ===
Fight Card
Weight Class				Method	Round	Notes
65 kg	(China) Xu Jifu	def.	(Netherlands) Peter Janssen	Decision (unanimous)	3	
70 kg	(Armenia) Marat Grigorian	def.	(Italy) Fernando Calzetta	TKO	1	Group F Final
70 kg	(Georgia (country)) Davit Kiria	def.	(China) Zheng Zhaoyu	KO	1	
80 kg	(Ukraine) Artur Kyshenko	def.	(China) Bai Jinbin	KO	1	
MMA 58 kg	(China) Jin Tang	def.	(Ukraine) Anastasia Rybalochko	TKO	1	
70 kg	(Italy) Fernando Calzetta	def.	(China) Mo Zhuangwei	KO	1	Group F Semifinal 2
70 kg	(Armenia) Marat Grigorian	def.	(Thailand) Aikpracha Meenayothin	KO	2	Group F Semifinal 1
77 kg	(China) Li Baoming	def.	(Canada) Allan Aldatov	Decision (unanimous)	3	
100+kg	(Belarus) Andrei Gerasimchuk	def.	(Netherlands) Ashwin Balrak	Decision (unanimous)	3	Super Heavyweight Tournament Final 16
100+kg	(South Korea) Yoo Yang-Rae	def.	(China) Wu Lahan	TKO	2	Super Heavyweight Tournament Final 16
100+kg	(Latvia) Konstantin Gluhov	def.	(United States) Mighty Mo	TKO (injury)	1	Super Heavyweight Tournament Final 16
MMA 58 kg	(China) Xiong Jingnan	def.	(Belarus) Lilya Kazak	TKO	3	
100+kg	(Netherlands) Hesdy Gerges	def.	(Belarus) Igor Bugaenko	TKO	2	Super Heavyweight Tournament Final 16
57 kg	(France) Alexis Barateau	def.	(Thailand) Bunsit	Decision (unanimous)	3	

=== 70kg World Max Group F tournament bracket ===
Semi-finals		Final
(Thailand) Aikpracha Meenayothin	3r.
(Armenia) Marat Grigorian	DEC	(Armenia) Marat Grigorian	DEC
(Italy) Fernando Calzetta	DEC	(Italy) Fernando Calzetta	3r.
(China) Mo Zhuangwei	3r.

== Kunlun Fight 20 ==
Kunlun Fight 20
- Promotion: Kunlun Fight
- Date: March 8, 2015
- Venue: Starlight Park
- City: Beijing, China

Event chronology
Kunlun Fight 19	Kunlun Fight 20	Kunlun Fight 21

Kunlun Fight 20 was a kickboxing event held by Kunlun Fight on March 8, 2015 at the Starlight Park in Beijing, China.

=== Results ===
Fight Card
Weight Class				Method	Round	Notes
70 kg	(China) Kong Lingfeng	def.	(China) Liu Mingzhi	Decision (unanimous)	3	Group G Final
75 kg	(China) Wang Hesong	def.	(Russia) Danil Vinnik	Decision	3	
75 kg	(Thailand) Krit	def.	(China) Aorigele	KO	3	
MMA 65 kg	(China) Wu Tianjin	def.	(Mongolia) Namjilmaa Bat-Erdene	TKO	1	
70 kg	(Kyrgyzstan) Alexei Fedoseev	def.	(China) Agudemu	Decision	3	
70 kg	(China) Liu Mingzhi	def.	(Kyrgyzstan) Ibraimov Mirlan	KO	3	Group G Semifinal 2
70 kg	(China) Kong Lingfeng	def.	(Japan) Hirayama Jin	KO	3	Group G Semifinal 1
70 kg	(China) Liu Hainan	def.	(China) Mo Zhuangwei	Decision	3	
70 kg	(Japan) Tomoyuki Nishikawa	def.	(China) Xiao Jie	Decision (unanimous)	3	
67 kg	(China) Wu Xuesong	def.	(Japan) Nakano Takuya	TKO	2	
65 kg	(China) Bai Lishuai	def.	(Japan) Suzuki Kotaro	TKO	2	
63 kg	(China) Wang Yanlong	def.	(Mongolia) Baatarchuluun Gantogtokh	Decision (unanimous)	3	
60 kg	(China) Hao Jiahao	def.	(Japan) Fujimoto Kouki	Decision	3	
70 kg	(China) Liu Hainan	def.	(China) Feng Lei	Decision	3	
70 kg	(China) Mo Zhuangwei	def.	(China) Bubigere	Decision	3	

=== 70kg World Max Group G tournament bracket ===
Semi-finals		Final
(Japan) Hirayama Jin	3r.
(China) Kong Lingfeng	DEC	(China) Kong Lingfeng	DEC
(China) Liu Mingzhi	DEC	(China) Liu Mingzhi	3r.
(Kyrgyzstan) Ibraimov Mirlan	3r.

== Kunlun Fight 21 ==
Kunlun Fight 21
- Promotion: Kunlun Fight
- Date: March 17, 2015
- Venue: Serenity Sanya Marina
- City: Sanya, China

Event chronology
Kunlun Fight 20	Kunlun Fight 21	Kunlun Fight - Cage Fight Series 2

Kunlun Fight 21 was a kickboxing event held by Kunlun Fight on March 17, 2015 at the Serenity Sanya Marina in Sanya, China.

=== Results ===
Fight Card
Weight Class				Method	Round	Notes
70 kg	(China) Wang Weihao	def.	(Thailand) Changpuak Jetsada Pongtong	Decision (unanimous)	4	
70 kg	(China) Jiao Fukai	def.	(Japan) Yuki Sugita	KO	2	
70 kg	(Belarus) Chingiz Allazov	def.	(Germany) Juri Kehl	Decision (unanimous)	3	Group H Final
77 kg	(China) Wang Chongyang	def.	(Slovenia) Marcel Jager	KO	1	
100+ kg	(Belarus) Andrei Gerasimchuk	def.	(United States) Steven Banks	TKO	1	Super Heavyweight Tournament Quarterfinals
MMA 56 kg	(China) Jin Tang	def.	(Mongolia) Bayarmaa Munkhgerel	Submission (RNC)	2	
100+ kg	(Netherlands) Jahfarr Wilnis	def.	(Ukraine) Roman Kryklia	Extra Round Decision	4	Super Heavyweight Tournament Quarterfinals
61.5 kg	(China) Wei Ninghui	def.	(Canada) Denis Puric	KO	2	
100+ kg	(Netherlands) Hesdy Gerges	def.	(Latvia) Konstantin Gluhov	TKO	3	Super Heavyweight Tournament Quarterfinals
70 kg	(China) Xu Yongba	def.	(United States) Cyrus Washington	Decision (unanimous)	3	
100+ kg	(China) Asihati	def.	(South Korea) Yoo Yang-Rae	KO	2	Super Heavyweight Tournament Quarterfinals
70 kg	(Germany) Juri Kehl	def.	(Australia) Milad Farzad	KO	1	Group H Semifinal 2
70 kg	(Belarus) Chingiz Allazov	def.	(Morocco) Mustapha Haida	Decision (unanimous)	3	Group H Semifinal 1
60 kg	(China) Wang Wanben	def.	(South Korea) Hong Seong-Bin	Decision (unanimous)	3	
65 kg	(Portugal) Maria Lobo	def.	(China) He Qun	Dec	3	

=== 70kg World Max Group H tournament bracket ===
Semi-finals		Final
(Australia) Milad Farzad	1r.
(Germany) Juri Kehl	KO	(Belarus) Chingiz Allazov	DEC
(Belarus) Chingiz Allazov	DEC	(Germany) Juri Kehl	3r.
(Morocco) Mustapha Haida	3r.

== Kunlun Fight - Cage Fight Series 2 ==
Kunlun Fight - Cage Fight Series 2
- Promotion: Kunlun Fight
- Date: April 4, 2015
- Venue: Baluan Sholak Sports Palace
- City: Almaty, Kazakhstan

Event chronology
Kunlun Fight 21	Kunlun Fight - Cage Fight Series 2	Kunlun Fight 22

Kunlun Fight - Cage Fight Series 2 was a mixed martial arts event held by Kunlun Fight on April 4, 2015 at the Baluan Sholak Sports Palace in Almaty, Kazakhstan.

=== Results ===
Fight Card
Weight Class				Method	Round	Notes
MMA 75 kg	(Kazakhstan) Beibit Nazarov	def.	(United States) Bruno Amorim	Decision (Unanimous)	3	For the Lightweight Championship
MMA 57 kg	(Kazakhstan) Kazbek Tigurov	def.	(South Korea) Won Seok Jung	Submission (Guillotine Choke)	1	
MMA 66 kg	(Kazakhstan) Askar Umbetov	def.	(United States) Kyle Rozewski	TKO	3	
MMA 66 kg	(Kazakhstan) Nurjan Tutkaev	def.	(France) Maxim Giakalon	Submission (Armbar)	2	
MMA 77 kg	(Kazakhstan) Baurzhan Kuanyshbayev	def.	(China) Yonghao Xu	Submission (Triangle Choke)	1	
MMA 61 kg	(Kazakhstan) Nurbergen Sharipov	def.	(China) Ma Shuang	Decision (Unanimous)	3	
MMA 75 kg	(Kazakhstan) Ruslan Kamzaev	def.	(France) Abdel′kerin El Kuèdi	Decision (Unanimous)	3	
MMA 61 kg	(Kazakhstan) Altynbek Bazhimov	def.	(China) Alateng Heili	Submission (Armbar)	1	
MMA 57 kg	(China) Zhifa Shang	def.	(Kazakhstan) Alpamys Adiâtov	Submission (Armbar)	1	

== Kunlun Fight 22 ==
Kunlun Fight 22
- Promotion: Kunlun Fight
- Date: April 12, 2015
- Venue: Changde College Sport Hall
- City: Changde, China

Event chronology
Kunlun Fight - Cage Fight Series 2	Kunlun Fight 22	Kunlun Fight 23

Kunlun Fight 22 was a kickboxing event held by Kunlun Fight on April 12, 2015 at the Changde College Sport Hall in Changde, China.

=== Results ===
Fight Card
Weight Class				Method	Round	Notes
MMA 68 kg	(China) Jianping Yang	def.	(Japan) Nubo Kozan	Submission (Rear Naked Choke)	1	
Kickboxing 70 kg	(Iran) Seyedisa Alamdarnezam	def.	(China) Zhang Chunyu	Decision (Unanimous)	3	
Kickboxing 70 kg	(Thailand) Yodsanklai Fairtex	def.	(Armenia) Marat Grigorian	Decision (Unanimous)	3	
MMA 58 kg	(China) Xiong Jingnan	def.	(Russia) Marina Lvova	TKO	1	
Kickboxing 65 kg	(Iran) Mahdi Mahmoudvand	def.	(China) Bai Lishuai	Decision (Unanimous)	3	
Kickboxing 80 kg	(China) Bai Jinbin	def.	(Iran) Saeid Chahardouli	Decision (Unanimous)	3	
MMA 70 kg	(China) Haotian Wu	def.	(Russia) Zulfikar Usmanov	Submission (Rear Naked Choke)	2	
Kickboxing 75 kg	(Portugal) Diego Antonio	def.	(China) Jiang Chunpeng	TKO	3	
MMA 58 kg	(Belarus) Liliya Kazak	def.	(China) Jin Tang	Submission (Armbar)	1	
MMA 68 kg	(China) Xibo Yan	def.	(Japan) Hidemasa Soga	KO	1	
MMA 60 kg	(Belarus) Vadim Zhlobich	def.	(China) Cheng Lin	Submission (Rear Naked Choke)	1	
Kickboxing 75 kg	(China) Liu Mingzhi	def.	(Brazil) Matheus Goncalves	Decision (Split)	3	

== Kunlun Fight 23 ==
Kunlun Fight 23
- Promotion: Kunlun Fight
- Date: April 26, 2015
- Venue: International Economics College Gymnasium
- City: Changsha, China

Event chronology
Kunlun Fight 22	Kunlun Fight 23	Kunlun Fight 24

Kunlun Fight 23 was a kickboxing event held by Kunlun Fight on April 26, 2015 at the International Economics College Gymnasium in Changsha, China.

=== Results ===
Fight Card
Weight Class				Method	Round	Notes
Kickboxing 70 kg	(Japan) Miyakoshi Soichiro	def.	(China) Kong Lingfeng	Decision	3	
MMA 57 kg	(China) Meixuan Zhang	def.	(Kazakhstan) Kazybek Ashimov	Submission (Triangle Choke)	3	For the Flyweight Championship
Kickboxing 100+ kg	(China) Asihati	def.	(Iran) Abbas	Decision (Unanimous)	3	
Kickboxing 80 kg	(Thailand) Arthit Hanchana	def.	(China) Nuerla Mulali	Decision (Unanimous)	3	80 kg Tournament Quarterfinals
Kickboxing 80 kg	(Ukraine) Artur Kyshenko	def.	(Brazil) Jonatan Oliveira	KO	3	80 kg Tournament Quarterfinals
Kickboxing 62 kg	(Thailand) Lerdsila Chumpairtour	def.	(China) Wei Ninghui	Decision (Unanimous)	3	
MMA 60 kg	(China) Xiong Jingnan	def.	(Ukraine) Viktoria Godomchuk	KO	1	
MMA 80 kg	(China) Sai Wang	def.	(Ukraine) Vasily Fedorych	Submission (Guillotine Choke)	1	
Kickboxing 70 kg	(Belarus) Dzianis Zuev	def.	(Thailand) Nong Sai	TKO (Cut)	2	
MMA 61 kg	(China) Yafei Zhao	def.	(South Korea) Bon Hyuk-Gu	Submission	1	
Kickboxing 52 kg	(China) E Meidie	def.	(Russia) Valeriya Drozdova	Decision (Unanimous)	3	
Kickboxing 75 kg	(Thailand) Krit	def.	(China) Wang Hesong	Decision (Unanimous)	3	

== Kunlun Fight 24 ==
Kunlun Fight 24
- Promotion: Kunlun Fight
- Date: May 2, 2015
- Venue: Palaferroli San Bonifacio
- City: Verona, Italy

Event chronology
Kunlun Fight 23	Kunlun Fight 24	Kunlun Fight 25

Kunlun Fight 24 was a kickboxing event held by Kunlun Fight on May 2, 2015 at the Palaferroli San Bonifacio in Verona, Italy.

=== Results ===
Fight Card
Weight Class				Method	Round	Notes
Kickboxing 70 kg	(Azerbaijan) Parviz Abdullayev	def.	(Romania) Alexandru Popescu	KO	1	
Kickboxing 67 kg	(Belarus) Andrei Kulebin	def.	(China) Zhao Yan	Decision (Unanimous)	3	
Kickboxing 70 kg	(France) Dylan Salvador	def.	(Thailand) Sitthichai Sitsongpeenong	Decision (Unanimous)	3	
Kickboxing 73 kg	(China) Zheng Zhaoyu	def.	(Italy) Eugeniu Deozu	Decision (Unanimous)	3	
MMA 70 kg	(China) Haotian Wu	def.	(China) Luca Marzioni	KO	1	
Muay Thai 67 kg	(France) Fabio Pinca	def.	(Italy) Mauro Serra	TKO	3	
Kickboxing 54 kg	(United Kingdom) Ruth Ashdown	vs.	(China) Ren Kailin	Draw	3	
Muay Thai	(Italy) Andrea Serra	def.	(China) Wu Jingcong	Decision	3	
Kickboxing	(Italy) Badr Mamdouh	def.	(France) Youssouf Saidi	TKO	1	
Kickboxing	(Italy) Silvia Bortot	def.	(Georgia (country)) Mariam Tatunashvili	Decision	5	
Kickboxing 100+ kg	(Netherlands) Deji Kalejaiye	def.	(Serbia) Milan Dasic	KO	1	
Kickboxing 71 kg	(Moldova) Matei Vitali	def.	(Italy) Jacopo Tarantino	KO	2	

== Kunlun Fight 25 ==
Kunlun Fight 25
- Promotion: Kunlun Fight
- Date: May 15, 2015
- Venue: Štiavničkách Sports Hall
- City: Banská Bystrica, Slovakia

Event chronology
Kunlun Fight 24	Kunlun Fight 25	Kunlun Fight - Cage Fight Series 3

Kunlun Fight 25 was a kickboxing event held by Kunlun Fight on May 15, 2015 at the Štiavničkách Sports Hall in Banská Bystrica, Slovakia.

=== Results ===
Fight Card
Weight Class				Method	Round	Notes
Kickboxing 77 kg	(Ukraine) Artur Kyshenko	def.	(Belarus) Dmitry Valent	Decision	3	
Kickboxing 70 kg	(Thailand) Superbon Banchamek	def.	(China) Deng Li	KO	3	Group I Final
MMA 60 kg	(China) Wu Tieyin	def.	(Slovakia) Miroslav Kuban	Decision (Majority)	3	
Kickboxing 72 kg	(China) Zheng Zhaoyu		(Serbia) Marko Adamovic	Decision (unanimous)	3	
Kickboxing 67 kg	(Russia) Vlad Tuinov	def.	(China) Wu Xuesong	Decision (unanimous)	3	
MMA 70 kg	(China) Wu Haotian	def.	(Slovakia) Martin Mihalik	TKO	1	
Kickboxing 60 kg	(China) Wang Wanben	def.	(Slovakia) Tomas Tkac	Decision (unanimous)	3	
Kickboxing 70 kg	(China) Deng Li	def.	(Spain) Hichem Menaouine	KO	1	Group I Semifinal 2
Kickboxing 70 kg	(Thailand) Superbon Banchamek	def.	(Poland) Lukasz Plawecki	Decision (unanimous)	3	Group I Semifinal 1
Kickboxing 79 kg	(China) Li Baoming	def.	(Slovenia) Michal Tomko	Decision	3	
Lethwei 70 kg	(Slovenia) Vladimir Konsky	def.	(Myanmar) Yea Da Gon	Decision	3	
Kickboxing 70 kg	(Germany) Enriko Kehl	def.	(France) Mohamed Diaby	Decision (extra round)	4	
Kickboxing 75 kg	(Slovakia) Peter Lamper	def.	(China) Liu Mingzhi	Decision (unanimous)	3	
Kickboxing	(Ukraine) Volodymyr Artemenko	def.	(Romania) Claudiu Corbeanu	Decision	3	
Kickboxing 67 kg	(China) Chen Junxian	def.	(Slovakia) Matej Kalisky	KO	1	
Kickboxing 75 kg	(Slovakia) Jan Mazur	def.	(China) Duoli Chen	Decision (unanimous)	3	
Lethwei 75 kg	(Slovakia) Igor Danis	vs.	(Myanmar) Too Too	Draw	3	

=== 70kg World Max Group I tournament bracket ===
Semi-finals		Final
(Poland) Lukasz Plawecki	3r.
(Thailand) Superbon Banchamek	DEC	(Thailand) Superbon Banchamek	KO
(China) Deng Li	DEC	(China) Deng Li	1r.
(Spain) Hichem Menaouine	3r.

== Kunlun Fight - Cage Fight Series 3 ==
Kunlun Fight - Cage Fight Series 3
- Promotion: Kunlun Fight
- Date: June 6, 2015
- Venue: Jiangnan Sports Hall
- City: Chongqing, China

Event chronology
Kunlun Fight 25	Kunlun Fight - Cage Fight Series 3	Kunlun Fight 26

Kunlun Fight - Cage Fight Series 3 was a mixed martial arts event held by Kunlun Fight on June 6, 2015 at the Jiangnan Sports Hall in Chongqing, China.

=== Results ===
Fight Card
Weight Class				Method	Round	Notes
MMA 57 kg	(China) Meixuan Zhang (c)	def.	(Sweden) Ricky Granstad	Submission (Guillotine Choke)	2	For the Flyweight Championship
MMA 80 kg	(China) Sai Wang	def.	(Mongolia) Batmunkh Burenzorig	KO (Body Kick)	2	
MMA 70 kg	(Kazakhstan) Beibit Nazarov (c)	def.	(China) Haotian Wu	Submission (Armbar)	1	For the Lightweight Championship
MMA 66 kg	(Kazakhstan) Nurjan Tutkaev	def.	(United States) Giovanni Moljo	KO (Body Punch)	1	
MMA 60 kg	(China) Jin Tang	def.	(Iran) Malihe Younes	TKO (Retirement)	3	
MMA 66 kg	(Kazakhstan) Nurjan Tutkaev	def.	(France) Maxim Giakalon	Submission (Armbar)	2	
MMA 68 kg	(China) Xibo Yan	def.	(Japan) Taiki Hamasaki	KO	1	
MMA 100+ kg	(Brazil) Marcelo Tenorio	def.	(Japan) Toyohiko Monma	Submission (Armbar )	1	
MMA 57 kg	(China) Zhifa Shang	def.	(Kazakhstan) Zhalgas Zhumagulov	Decision (Split)	3	
MMA 60 kg	(United States) Colleen Schneider	def.	(China) Xiong Jingnan	Decision (Unanimous)	3	
MMA 61 kg	(South Korea) Han Bin Park	def.	(China) Yafei Zhao	Submission (Rear Naked Choke)	2	

== Kunlun Fight 26 ==
Kunlun Fight 15
- Promotion: Kunlun Fight
- Date: June 7, 2015
- Venue: Jiangnan Sports Hall
- City: Chongqing, China

Event chronology
Kunlun Fight - Cage Fight Series 3	Kunlun Fight 15	Kunlun Fight 27

Kunlun Fight 26 was a kickboxing event held by Kunlun Fight on June 7, 2015 at the Jiangnan Sports Hall in Chongqing, China.

=== Results ===
Fight Card
Weight Class				Method	Round	Notes
100+kg	(Netherlands) Jahfarr Wilnis	def.	(Netherlands) Hesdy Gerges	Decision (unanimous - extra round)	4	Super Heavyweight Tournament Final
67 kg	(Thailand) Kaew Fairtex	def.	(China) Zhang Chunuy	Decision (unanimous)	3	
70 kg	(Spain) David Calvo	def.	(China) Pan Guodong	TKO	2	Group J Final
70 kg	(Thailand) Yodsanklai Fairtex	def.	(Belarus) Dzianis Zuev	Decision (unanimous)	3	
66 kg	(China) Bai Lishuai	def.	(South Korea) Ha-Jin Yoon	Decision (unanimous)	3	
62 kg	(China) Wei Ninghui	def.	(Poland) Tomasz Makowski	KO	1	
100+ kg	(Netherlands) Hesdy Gerges	def.	(Belarus) Andrey Gerasimchuk	Decision (unanimous)	3	Super Heavyweight Tournament Semifinals
100+ kg	(Netherlands) Jahfarr Wilnis	def.	(China) Asihati	KO	2	Super Heavyweight Tournament Semifinals
70 kg	(Spain) David Calvo	def.	(Iran) Seyedisa Alamdarnezam	Decision (unanimous)	3	Group J Semifinal 2
70 kg	(China) Pan Guodong	def.	(Denmark) Mohammed El Mir	Decision (split - extra round)	4	Group J Semifinal 1
100+ kg	(Ukraine) Roman Kryklia	def.	(Lithuania) Sergej Maslobojev	KO	3	
100+ kg	(China) Pu Dongdong	def.	(Latvia) Valery Brede	Decision (Extra Round)	4	

=== Super Heavyweight Tournament 2015 bracket ===
First round feat. in Kunlun Fight 15 & 19
(China) Wu Lahan	2r.
(South Korea) Yoo Yang-Rae	TKO
(China) Asihati	DEC
(Japan) Jairo Kusunoki	3r.
(Iran) Alireza Karbasi	1r.
(Netherlands) Jahfarr Wilnis	KO
(Ukraine) Roman Kryklia	KO
(Czech Republic) Tomáš Hron	1r.
(United States) Mighty Mo	1r.
(Latvia) Konstantin Gluhov	TKO
(Netherlands) Hesdy Gerges	TKO
(Belarus) Igor Bugaenko	2r.
(Netherlands) Ashwin Balrak	3r.
(Belarus) Andrei Gerasimchuk	DEC
(United States) Steven Banks	DEC
(Russia) Anatoly Yakoviev	3r.

Quarter-finals feat. in Kunlun Fight 21
(South Korea) Yoo Yang-Rae	2r.
(China) Asihati	KO
(Netherlands) Jahfarr Wilnis	DEC
(Ukraine) Roman Kryklia	3r.
(Latvia) Konstantin Gluhov	TKO
(Netherlands) Hesdy Gerges	3r.
(Belarus) Andrei Gerasimchuk	TKO
(United States) Steven Banks	1r.

Semi-finals
(China) Asihati	2r.
(Netherlands) Jahfarr Wilnis	KO
(Netherlands) Hesdy Gerges	DEC
(Belarus) Andrey Gerasimchuk	3r.

Final
(Netherlands) Jahfarr Wilnis	DEC
(Netherlands) Hesdy Gerges	4r.

=== 70kg World Max Group J tournament bracket ===
Semi-finals		Final
(Denmark) Mohammed El Mir	4r.
(China) Pan Guodong	DEC	(Spain) David Calvo	TKO
(Spain) David Calvo	DEC	(China) Pan Guodong	2r.
(Iran) Seyedisa Alamdarnezam	3r.

== Kunlun Fight 27 ==
Kunlun Fight 27
- Promotion: Kunlun Fight
- Date: July 18, 2015
- Venue: Wutaishan Sports Center
- City: Nanjing, China

Event chronology
Kunlun Fight 26	Kunlun Fight 27	Kunlun Fight 28

Kunlun Fight 27 was a kickboxing event held by Kunlun Fight on July 18, 2015 at the Wutaishan Sports Center in Nanjing, China.

=== Results ===
Fight Card
Weight Class				Method	Round	Notes
70 kg	(Ukraine) Enriko Gogokhia	def.	(China) Wang Weihao	Decision (unanimous)	3	Group K Final
62 kg	(China) Wei Ninghui	def.	(Japan) Keijiro Miyakoshi	Decision (Split)	3	
MMA 66 kg	(China) Yan Xibo	def.	(South Korea) Jae-Yong Lee	KO	1	
80 kg	(Belarus) Dmitry Valent	def.	(China) Chen Yawei	TKO	3	80kg Tournament Quarterfinals
62 kg	(Belarus) Maksim Petkevich	def.	(China) Lei Penghui	Decision (extra round)	4	
MMA 70 kg	(France) Michael Dubois	def.	(China) Habiti Tuerxunbieke	Submission	1	
52 kg	(China) E Meidie	def.	(Belarus) Viktoria Palianskaya	Decision (unanimous)	3	Female 52kg Tournament Quarterfinals
52 kg	(France) Anissa Meksen	def.	(China) Ren Kailin	Decision (unanimous)	3	Female 52 kg Tournament Quarterfinals
67 kg	(China) Gu Hui	def.	(Hong Kong) Chan Chun-Yin	KO	1	
70 kg	(Ukraine) Enriko Gogokhia	def.	(Japan) Soichiro Miyakoshi	TKO	3	Group K Semifinal 2
70 kg	(China) Wang Weihao	def.	(United States) Warren Stavone	KO	2	Group K Semifinal 1
73 kg	(China) Zhang Yang	def.	(China) Li Siyuan	Decision	3	
56 kg	(China) Tang Zoie	def.	(China) Zhao Yueer	Decision	3	
62 kg	(China) Zhang Tao	def.	(China) Song Mengxiao	Decision	3	

=== 70kg World Max Group K tournament bracket ===
Semi-finals		Final
(United States) Warren Stavone	3r.
(China) Wang Weihao	DEC	(Ukraine) Enriko Gogokhia	DEC
(Ukraine) Enriko Gogokhia	TKO	(China) Wang Weihao	3r.
(Japan) Soichiro Miyakoshi	3r.

== Kunlun Fight 28 ==
Kunlun Fight 28
- Promotion: Kunlun Fight
- Date: July 19, 2015
- Venue: Wutaishan Sports Center
- City: Nanjing, China

Event chronology
Kunlun Fight 27	Kunlun Fight 28	Kunlun Fight 29

Kunlun Fight 28 was a kickboxing event held by Kunlun Fight on July 19, 2015 at the Wutaishan Sports Center in Nanjing, China.

=== Results ===
Fight Card
Weight Class				Method	Round	Notes
70 kg	(Spain) Jonay Risco	def.	(China) Zhao Shuai	KO	2	Group L Final
72 kg	(China) Zheng Zhaoyu	def.	(Ukraine) Sergey	TKO	1	
MMA 60 kg	(China) Wu Tieyin	def.	(Japan) Tomoki Hara	TKO	3	
80 kg	(China) Bai Jinbin	def.	(Russia) Alexander Stetsurenko	Decision (unanimous)	3	80kg Tournament Quarterfinals
75 kg	(Azerbaijan) Parviz Abdullayev	def.	(China) Zhang Zhaoguan	Decision	3	
MMA 70 kg	(Azerbaijan) Heydar Mamedaliev	def.	(Brazil) Bruno Amorin	KO	3	
67 kg	(Romania) Daniel Corbeanu	def.	(China) Bai Lishuai	Decision (Split)	3	
70 kg	(China) Kong Lingfeng	def.	(China) Mo Zhuangwei	TKO	3	
MMA	(South Korea) Park Sang-Hyun	def.	(China) Chu Guangfu	Submission	1	
70 kg	(Netherlands) Albert Kraus	def.	(China) Zhao Yan	TKO	2	
70 kg	(Spain) Jonay Risco	def.	(Russia) Maksym Smirnov	Decision (unanimous)	3	Group L Semifinal 2
70 kg	(China) Zhao Shuai	def.	(Brazil) Bruno Miranda	KO	3	Group L Semifinal 1

=== 70kg World Max Group L tournament bracket ===
Semi-finals		Final
(Brazil) Bruno Miranda	3r.
(China) Zhao Shuai	KO	(Spain) Jonay Risco	KO
(Spain) Jonay Risco	TKO	(China) Zhao Shuai	2r.
(Russia) Maksym Smirnov	3r.

== Kunlun Fight 29 ==
Kunlun Fight 29
- Promotion: Kunlun Fight
- Date: August 15, 2015
- Venue: Ice Cube Curling Center
- City: Sochi, Russia

Event chronology
Kunlun Fight 28	Kunlun Fight 29	Kunlun Fight 30 / Topking World Series: TK5

Kunlun Fight 29 was a kickboxing event held by Kunlun Fight on August 15, 2015 at the Ice Cube Curling Center in Sochi, Russia.

=== Results ===
Fight Card
Weight Class				Method	Round	Notes
MMA 70 kg	(Russia) Alexandr Shabliy	def.	(China) Wu Haotian	KO	1	
Kickboxing 80 kg	(Russia) Surik Magakyan	def.	(China) Bai Jinbin	Decision (unanimous)	3	
MMA 62 kg	(Russia) Alexander Keshtov	def.	(China) Zhao Yafei	Decision (unanimous)	3	
Kickboxing 60 kg	(Russia) Ruslan Tozliyan	def.	(China) Li Shuaihu	Decision (unanimous)	3	
MMA 75 kg	(Russia) Victor Kolesnik	def.	(China) Xu Yonghao	Submission (Armbar)	1	
Kickboxing 70 kg	(Russia) Dzhabar Askerov	def.	(China) Liu Mingzhi	TKO	1	Group M Final
Kickboxing 80 kg	(Azerbaijan) Alim Nabiev	def.	(Belarus) Pavel Turuk	TKO	2	
Kickboxing 100+ kg	(Netherlands) Jahfarr Wilnis	def.	(Belarus) Valentin Slavikovski	Decision (unanimous)	3	
MMA 100+ kg	(United States) Brandon Cash	def.	(Ukraine) Dmitriy Mikutsa	TKO	3	
Kickboxing 70 kg	(Russia) Anatoly Moiseev	def.	(Romania) Cristian Milea	Decision (unanimous)	3	
MMA 58 kg	(China) Meixuan Zhang	def.	(Kyrgyzstan) Umar Akhmatov	KO	2	
Kickboxing 70 kg	(Russia) Dzhabar Askerov	def.	(Germany) Enriko Kehl	KO	2	Group M Semifinal 2
Kickboxing 70 kg	(China) Liu Mingzhi	def.	(United States) Landon Simmons	Decision (unanimous)	3	Group M Semifinal 1

=== 70kg World Max Group M tournament bracket ===
Semi-finals		Final
(United States) Landon Simmons	3r.
(China) Liu Mingzhi	KO	(Russia) Dzhabar Askerov	TKO
(Russia) Dzhabar Askerov	KO	(China) Liu Mingzhi	1r.
(Germany) Enriko Kehl	1r.

== Kunlun Fight 30 / Topking World Series: TK5 ==
Kunlun Fight 30 / Topking World Series: TK5
- Promotion: Kunlun Fight / Topking
- Date: September 4, 2015
- Venue: Zhoukou Sports Center
- City: Zhoukou, China

Event chronology
Kunlun Fight 29	Kunlun Fight 30 / Topking World Series: TK5	Kunlun Fight 31

Kunlun Fight 30 / Topking World Series: TK5 was a kickboxing event held by Kunlun Fight on September 4, 2015 at the Zhoukou Sports Center in Zhoukou, China.

=== Results ===
Fight Card
Weight Class				Method	Round	Notes
MMA 68 kg	(China) Yan Xibo	def.	(Japan) Hiroyoshi Tateishi	TKO	1	
Kickboxing 70 kg	(China) Zheng Zhaoyu	def.	(Thailand) Burneng	KO	2	
Muay Thai 70 kg	(Thailand) Apisak Fight Factory Gym		(China) Zhang Chunyu	Draw	3	
Muay Thai 70 kg	(China) Pu Dongdong	def.	(Morocco) Nabil Boujenan	Decision (unanimous)	3	Topking World Series 2015 Tournament Quarterfinals
Muay Thai 70 kg	(Peru) Sergio Giovanni Mazzetti	def.	(Spain) Carlos De Celis	Decision (unanimous)	3	Topking World Series 2015 Tournament Quarterfinals
Muay Thai 70 kg	(Thailand) Thongchai Sitsongpeenong	def.	(Turkey) Aydin Tuncay	TKO	1	
Muay Thai 70 kg	(Thailand) Kem Sitsongpeenong	def.	(Italy) Martin Meoni	TKO	1	Topking World Series 2015 Tournament Quarterfinals
Muay Thai 70 kg	(Thailand) Aikpracha Meenayothin	def.	(Belarus) Pavel Dzialendzik	TKO	1	
Muay Thai 70 kg	(Ukraine) Sergey Kulyaba	def.	(Japan) Nishikawa Tomoyuki	Decision (unanimous)	3	Topking World Series 2015 Tournament Quarterfinals
Kickboxing 75 kg	(China) Nuerla Mulali	def.	(Azerbaijan) Parviz Abdullayev	Decision (unanimous)	3	
Kickboxing 100+ kg	(United States) Steven Banks	def.	(China) Asihati	Decision (unanimous)	3	
Kickboxing 70 kg	(China) Wu Xuesong	def.	(Ukraine) Konstantinov Dmytro	Decision (unanimous)	3	
MMA 60 kg	(China) Xiong Jingnan	def.	(Ukraine) Daria Chibisova	TKO	1	
Kickboxing 70 kg	(China) Wang Weihao	def.	(Serbia) Marko Adamovic	Decision (split)	3	
Kickboxing	(China) Zhang Guangyi	def.	(China) Song Cheng	Decision	3	

== Kunlun Fight 31 ==
Kunlun Fight 31
- Promotion: Kunlun Fight
- Date: September 28, 2015
- Venue: Asiatique
- City: Bangkok, Thailand

Event chronology
Kunlun Fight 30 / Topking World Series: TK5	Kunlun Fight 31	Kunlun Fight - Cage Fight Series 4

Kunlun Fight 31 was a kickboxing event held by Kunlun Fight on September 28, 2015 at the Asiatique in Bangkok, Thailand.

=== Results ===
Fight Card
Weight Class				Method	Round	Notes
Muay Thai 67 kg	(Thailand) Petchtanong Banchamek	def.	(China) Gu Hui	Decision (unanimous)	3	
Muay Thai 77 kg	(Australia) Milad Farzad	def.	(Thailand) Namphol Nampakdee	Decision (unanimous)	3	
Kickboxing 70 kg	(Russia) Vladimir Shuliak	def.	(China) Zhao Yan	Decision (Majority)	3	
Kickboxing 65 kg	(China) Bai Lishuai	def.	(Papua New Guinea) Jonathan Tuhu	Decision (unanimous)	3	
Kickboxing 70 kg	(Thailand) Sitthichai Sitsongpeenong	def.	(Spain) Jonay Risco	Decision (unanimous)	3	70 kg World Max 2015 Tournament Final 16
Kickboxing 70 kg	(Thailand) Superbon Banchamek	def.	(China) Zheng Zhaoyu	KO	2	70 kg World Max 2015 Tournament Final 16
Kickboxing 52 kg	(China) Yang Yang	def.	(Germany) Dilara Yildiz	Decision (unanimous)	3	
MMA 72 kg	(United States) Dylan Fussel	def.	(China) Zhu Qingxiang	TKO	1	
MMA 60 kg	(China) Alateng Heili	def.	(Philippines) Jessie Rafols	Submission (Standing Guillotine Choke)	2	
Kickboxing 52 kg	(China) Xu Zhurong	def.	(Romania) Delia Georgescu	Decision (unanimous)	3	Female 52kg Tournament Quarterfinals
Kickboxing 52 kg	(Netherlands) Isis Verbeek	def.	(China) Li Mingrui	Decision (unanimous)	3	Female 52kg Tournament Quarterfinals
MMA 77 kg	(Canada) Liam McGowan	def.	(China) Jian Tao	Decision (Majority)	3	
Kickboxing 70 kg	(China) Bubigere	def.	(France) Fadla Nasser	KO	1	
Kickboxing 63 kg	(China) Zhang Guangyi	def.	(France) Sellami Omar	Decision (unanimous)	3	
Kickboxing 54 kg	(Thailand) Singsiam Krudamgan	def.	(Hong Kong) Alfred Kwong	Decision (unanimous)	3	

== Kunlun Fight - Cage Fight Series 4 ==
Kunlun Fight - Cage Fight Series 4
- Promotion: Kunlun Fight
- Date: October 4, 2015
- Venue: Astana Racing Center
- City: Astana, Kazakhstan

Event chronology
Kunlun Fight 31	Kunlun Fight - Cage Fight Series 4	Kunlun Fight 32

Kunlun Fight - Cage Fight Series 4 was a mixed martial arts event held by Kunlun Fight on October 4, 2015 at the Astana Racing Center in Astana, Kazakhstan.

=== Results ===
Fight Card
Weight Class				Method	Round	Notes
MMA 70 kg	(Kazakhstan) Beibit Nazarov (c)	def.	(Italy) Massimo Capusella	KO	1	For the Lightweight Championship
MMA 84 kg	(Russia) Magomed Magomedkerimov	def.	(Ukraine) Artem Shokalo	Decision (Unanimous)	3	
MMA 72 kg	(China) Zhang Lipeng	def.	(Japan) Makoto Maeda	Submission (Rear Naked Choke)	1	
MMA 72 kg	(France) Michael Dubois	def.	(Kazakhstan) Ruslan Kamzaev	Submission (Rear Naked Choke)	1	
MMA 61.5 kg	(China) Guangfu Chu	def.	(Azerbaijan) Mehman Mamedov	Submission (Kneebar)	1	
MMA 100+ kg	(Russia) Evgeny Erokhin	def.	(Ukraine) Vladimir Mishchenko	TKO	1	
MMA 58.5 kg	(China) Meixuan Zhang (c)	def.	(Kazakhstan) Kazybek Ashimov	Submission (Guillotine Choke)	2	For the Flyweight Championship
MMA 61.5 kg	(South Korea) Seung Gu Kim	def.	(China) Jumayi Ayideng	KO	3	
MMA 62.5 kg	(Kyrgyzstan) Tilek Batyrov	def.	(United States) Giovanni Moljo	Decision (Majority)	3	
MMA 61.5 kg	(Kazakhstan) Nurbergen Sharipov	def.	(Azerbaijan) Elnar Ibragimov	Decision (Majority)	3	
MMA 57 kg	(China) Zhifa Shang	def.	(Belarus) Evgeniy Manko	Decision (Unanimous)	3	
MMA 68 kg	(South Korea) Seung Woo Choi	def.	(Kazakhstan) Nurjan Tutkaev	Decision (Split)	3	

== Kunlun Fight 32 ==
Kunlun Fight 32
- Promotion: Kunlun Fight
- Date: October 28, 2015
- Venue: Daxian Stadium
- City: Dazhou, China

Event chronology
Kunlun Fight - Cage Fight Series 4	Kunlun Fight 32	Kunlun Fight 33

Kunlun Fight 32 was a kickboxing event held by Kunlun Fight on October 28, 2015 at the Daxian Stadium in Dazhou, China.

=== Results ===
Fight Card
Weight Class				Method	Round	Notes
Kickboxing 52 kg	(China) E Meidie	def.	(France) Anissa Meksen	TKO (retirement)	4	Female 52kg Tournament Final
Muay Thai 70 kg	(Thailand) Buakaw Banchamek	def.	(China) Gu Hui	TKO	2	
Kickboxing 100+ kg	(China) Yang Yu	def.	(Japan) Takeshi Kodaira	KO	1	
MMA 77 kg	(Mongolia) Batmunkh Burenzorig	def.	(Pakistan) Nosherwan Khanzada	KO	2	
MMA 66 kg	(France) Mourad Ennaceri	def.	(China) Yan Xibo	Submission	3	
Kickboxing 70 kg	(China) Wang Weihao	def.	(Ukraine) Ievgenii Schevchenko	Decision (unanimous)	3	
Kickboxing 65 kg	(China) Bai Lishuai	def.	(South Korea) Jisoo Jung	Decision (unanimous)	3	
Kickboxing 70 kg	(Australia) Victor Nagbe	def.	(Belarus) Dzianis Zuev	Decision (Extra Round)	4	70 kg World Max 2015 Tournament Final 16
Kickboxing 70 kg	(Georgia (country)) Davit Kiria	def.	(Spain) David Calvo	TKO	2	70 kg World Max 2015 Tournament Final 16
Kickboxing 60 kg	(China) Wang Kehan	def.	(Germany) Michaela Michl	Decision (unanimous)	3	
Kickboxing 52 kg	(France) Anissa Meksen	def.	(China) Xu Zhurong	Decision (Split)	3	Female 52kg Tournament Semifinals
Kickboxing 52 kg	(China) E Meidie	def.	(Netherlands) Isis Verbeek	Decision (unanimous)	3	Female 52kg Tournament Semifinals
Kickboxing 65 kg	(China) Wang Xiaowei	def.	(China) Wang Jingwei	Decision (unanimous)	3	
Kickboxing 70 kg	(China) Bubigere	def.	(China) Zhong Weipen	Decision (unanimous)	3	

=== Female 52kg Tournament 2015 bracket ===
Quarter-finals feat. in Kunlun Fight 27 & 31
(China) Li Mingrui	3r.
(Netherlands) Isis Verbeek	DEC
(China) E Meidie	DEC
(Belarus) Viktoria Palianskaya	3r.
(China) Ren Kailin	3r.
(France) Anissa Meksen	DEC
(China) Xu Zhurong	DEC
(Romania) Delia Georgescu	3r.

Semi-finals
(Netherlands) Isis Verbeek	3r.
(China) E Meidie	DEC
(France) Anissa Meksen	DEC
(China) Xu Zhurong	3r.

Final
(China) E Meidie	TKO
(France) Anissa Meksen	4r.

== Kunlun Fight 33 ==
Kunlun Fight 33
- Promotion: Kunlun Fight
- Date: October 31, 2015
- Venue: Changde College Sport Hall
- City: Changde, China

Event chronology
Kunlun Fight 32	Kunlun Fight 33	Kunlun Fight 34

Kunlun Fight 33 was a kickboxing event held by Kunlun Fight on October 31, 2015 at the Changde College Sport Hall in Changde, China.

=== Results ===
Fight Card
Weight Class				Method	Round	Notes
MMA 68 kg	(China) Yang Jianping	def.	(Japan) Tomoaki Ueyama	Submission (Guillotine Choke)	1	
Kickboxing 60 kg	(China) Cong Wang	def.	(Kyrgyzstan) Valentina Shevchenko	Decision (unanimous)	3	For the Kunlun Fight Women's Lightweight Championship
Kickboxing 70 kg	(Thailand) Yodsanklai Fairtex	def.	(Russia) Dzhabar Askerov	Decision (unanimous)	3	70 kg World Max 2015 Tournament Final 16
MMA 70 kg	(China) Zhang Lipeng	def.	(Egypt) Amr Fathee Wahman	Submission (Armbar)	1	
Kickboxing 70 kg	(Ukraine) Enriko Gogokhia	def.	(Australia) Steve Moxon	Decision (unanimous)	3	70 kg World Max 2015 Tournament Final 16
MMA 58 kg	(China) Jin Tang	def.	(Italy) Mara Romero Borella	KO	1	
Kickboxing 75 kg	(China) Nuerla Mulali	def.	(Belgium) Alka Matewa	Decision (unanimous)	3	
Kickboxing 70 kg	(China) Kong Lingfeng	def.	(China) Wu Xuesong	Decision (unanimous)	3	70 kg World Max 2015 Tournament Final 16
Kickboxing 100+ kg	(China) Xiu Pengcheng	def.	(United States) Steven Banks	TKO	2	
Kickboxing 70 kg	(China) Zhang Chunyu	def.	(Romania) Amansio Paraschiv	Decision (unanimous)	3	70 kg World Max 2015 Tournament Final 16
Kickboxing 67 kg	(China) Jia Aoqi	def.	(Russia) Vlad Tuinov	Decision (Split)	3	
Kickboxing 70 kg	(South Korea) Kim Minsoo	def.	(China) Zhao Yan	Decision (unanimous)	3	
Kickboxing 65 kg	(China) Wang Shaojiang	def.	(China) Gao Xuchao	KO	2	
Kickboxing 60 kg	(China) Wang Fan	def.	(China) Chen Wende	Decision (unanimous)	3	

== Kunlun Fight 34 ==
Kunlun Fight 34
- Promotion: Kunlun Fight
- Date: November 21, 2015
- Venue: Shenzhen Bay Gymnasium
- City: Shenzhen, China

Event chronology
Kunlun Fight 33	Kunlun Fight 34	Kunlun Fight 35

Kunlun Fight 34 was a kickboxing event held by Kunlun Fight on November 21, 2015 at the Shenzhen Bay Gymnasium in Shenzhen, China.

=== Results ===
Fight Card
Weight Class				Method	Round	Notes
Kickboxing 75 kg	(China) Nuerla Mulali	def.	(China) Wang Yuhu	Decision (unanimous)	3	Tournament Final
MMA 72 kg	(China) Zhang Lipeng	def.	(Russia) Gadzhimusa Gaziev	Submission (North-South Choke)	1	
Kickboxing 100+ kg	(China) Asihati	def.	(South Africa) Francois Botha	Decision (unanimous)	3	
Muay Thai 61 kg	(China) Wu Jingcong	def.	(Mongolia) Enkhee	TKO	2	
Kickboxing 100+ kg	(Netherlands) Murat Aygun	def.	(Latvia) Konstantin Gluhov	Decision	3	
MMA 57 kg	(China) Shang Zhifa	def.	(Philippines) Roberto Miguel Medalla	Submission	1	
Kickboxing 80 kg	(China) Li Baoming	def.	(Belgium) Alka Matewa	Decision	3	
Kickboxing 80 kg	(China) Cao Lujian	def	(England) Paul Eduardo Arguelles	TKO	1	
Kickboxing 64 kg	(China) Wei Ninghui	def.	(Italy) Andrea Serra	TKO	2	
MMA 58 kg	(China) Jin Tang	def.	(Egypt) Aya Saeid Saber	Submission (Armbar)	1	
Kickboxing 75 kg	(China) Nuerla Mulali	def.	(Iran) Rezamanesh Benzad	TKO	3	Tournament Semifinal 1
Kickboxing 75 kg	(China) Wang Yuhu	def.	(Slovakia) Jan Mazur	TKO	2	Tournament Semifinal 2
Kickboxing 75 kg	(China) Liu Mingzhi	def.	(Romania) Alin Cîmpan	Decision (unanimous)	3	Tournament Reserve
Kickboxing 54 kg	(Philippines) Michael Dacuno	def.	(China) Alfred Kwong	Decision (unanimous)	3	

=== 75kg tournament bracket ===
Semi-finals		Final
(Iran) Rezamanesh Benzad	3r.
(China) Nuerla Mulali	TKO	(China) Nuerla Mulali	TKO
(China) Wang Yuhu	TKO	(China) Wang Yuhu	1r.
(Slovakia) Jan Mazur	1r.

== Kunlun Fight 35 ==
Kunlun Fight 35
- Promotion: Kunlun Fight
- Date: December 19, 2015
- Venue: Luoyang Stadium
- City: Luoyang, China

Event chronology
Kunlun Fight 34	Kunlun Fight 35	Kunlun Fight 36

Kunlun Fight 35 was a kickboxing event held by Kunlun Fight on December 19, 2015 at the Luoyang Stadium in Luoyang, China.

=== Results ===
Fight Card
Weight Class				Method	Round	Notes
Kickboxing 80 kg	(Ukraine) Artur Kyshenko	def.	(Belarus) Dmitry Valent	KO	1	80 kg Tournament Final
Kickboxing 70 kg	(Thailand) Sitthichai Sitsongpeenong	def.	(Armenia) Marat Grigorian	Decision (Majority)	3	70 kg World Max 2015 Tournament Quarterfinal 4
MMA 61 kg	(Kazakhstan) Daulet Userbay	def.	(China) Yan Xibo	Submission	3	
Kickboxing 70 kg	(Thailand) Superbon Banchamek	def.	(China) Zhang Chunyu	KO	2	70 kg World Max 2015 Tournament Quarterfinal 3
Kickboxing 90 kg	(China) Wang Chongyang	def.	(Romania) Sebastian Ciobanu	Decision (unanimous)	3	
Kickboxing 70 kg	(Ukraine) Enriko Gogokhia	def.	(Georgia (country)) Davit Kiria	Decision (Majority)	3	70 kg World Max 2015 Tournament Quarterfinal 2
MMA 61 kg	(China) Wu Tieyin	def.	(Israel) Kirill Medvedovski	Decision (unanimous)	3	
Kickboxing 70 kg	(Australia) Victor Nagbe	def.	(China) Kong Lingfeng	Decision (unanimous)	3	70 kg World Max 2015 Tournament Quarterfinal 1
MMA 61 kg	(China) Xie Junpeng	def.	(China) Zhao Yafei	Submission	3	
Kickboxing 64 kg	(China) Wei Ninghui	def.	(South Korea) Kim Dongsu	Decision (unanimous)	3	
Kickboxing 80 kg	(Belarus) Dmitry Valent	def.	(Thailand) Arthit Hanchana	Decision (unanimous)	3	80 kg Tournament Semifinal 2
Kickboxing 80 kg	(Ukraine) Artur Kyshenko	def.	(Netherlands) Eyevan Danenberg	KO	2	80 kg Tournament Semifinal 1
Kickboxing 80 kg	(Latvia) Artur Gorlov	def.	(China) Deng Ningning	Decision (unanimous)	3	80 kg Tournament Reserve Fight
MMA 52 kg	(China) Zhang Weili	def.	(France) Samantha Jean-Francois	TKO	1	
Kickboxing 63.5 kg	(China) Tang Yao	vs.	(China) Wang Shaojian	Draw	3	

=== 80kg Tournament 2015 bracket ===
Quarter-finals feat. in Kunlun Fight 23 & 28
(Russia) Alexander Stetsurenko	3r.
(China) Bai Jinbin	DEC
(Ukraine) Artur Kyshenko	KO
(Brazil) Jonatan Oliveira	3r.
(China) Chen Yawei	3r.
(Belarus) Dmitry Valent	TKO
(Thailand) Arthit Hanchana	DEC
(China) Nuerla	3r.

Semi-finals
(China) Bai Jinbin	2r.
(Ukraine) Artur Kyshenko	KO
(Belarus) Dmitry Valent	DEC
(Thailand) Arthit Hanchana	3r.

Final
(Ukraine) Artur Kyshenko	DEC
(Belarus) Dmitry Valent	3r.

== See also ==
- List of Kunlun Fight events
- 2015 in Glory
- 2015 in K-1
