= Alexander Stetsurenko =

Russian welterweight kickboxer (born 1983)

Alexander Yurievich Stetsurenko
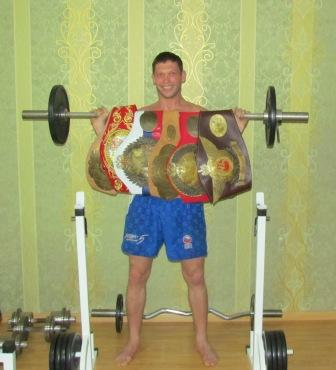
- Born: Александр Юрьевич Стецуренко; April 20, 1983 (age 43); Saratov, Russia
- Other names: The Great
- Nationality: Russian
- Height: 1.80 m (5 ft 11 in)
- Weight: 81 kg (179 lb; 12 st 11 lb)
- Division: Welterweight
- Style: Kickboxing
- Stance: Orthodox
- Fighting out of: Saratov, Russia
- Years active: 2005 - present

Professional boxing record
- Total: 2
- Wins: 1
- Losses: 1

Kickboxing record
- Total: 83
- Wins: 66
- By knockout: 29
- Losses: 17
- By knockout: 2

Mixed martial arts record
- Total: 1
- Wins: 1
- By knockout: 1
- Losses: 0

Other information
- Boxing record from BoxRec
- Mixed martial arts record from Sherdog

Alexander Yuryevich Stetsurenko (Russian: Александр Юрьевич Стецуренко; born April 20, 1983) is a Russian welterweight kickboxer. He is a three time Tatneft Cup tournament winner, Kunlun Fight tournament winner and W5 World champion.

Combat Press has ranked him in the welterweight top ten between September 2014 and September 2015, March and September 2017, as well as between May 2018 and June 2019.

== Kickboxing career ==
Stetsurenko is well known for having trilogy with best Russian kickboxer, Artem Levin. It all started in March 2008 for the WMC intercontinental title, where he was defeated by unanimous decision in five rounds. Later, on Tatneft Cup 2009 Final he became one of the very few to defeat Levin, dropping him two times in round 4 with corner retirement after that round and Stetsurenko became Tatneft Arena Cup champion for second time. Third fight was on November 19, 2010, on Battle of Champions V event with Levin taking second victory. Later Levin described Stetsurenko as the hardest opponent he has ever had to face and says fighting him is “physically and mentally exhausting.”

On November 26, 2011, he participated in a Forward Challenge – European Grand Prix along with seven kickboxing champions, defeating Nahid Asadov and Ernestas Dapkus before facing Mareks Lavrinovics in the final. Mareks was more active in the ring and successfully worked with the legs, but one kick ended in Stetsurenko's knee and fight was stopped because of injury, making Stetsurenko tournament champion. They had a rematch the next year with the same epilogue.

He fought once again for the Tatneft Arena World Cup on October 20, 2012, rematching Hicham El Gaoui, of which he lost in Tatneft 2011 final in a super fight. This was another close fight, Hicham probably won first three rounds, but without knockdown so according to Tatneft's rules there was an extra round where Stetsurenko got the razor thin decision victory.

On February 6, 2015, Stetsurenko was part of a one-night, four-man welterweight tournament at Glory 19 to determine who would get the next title shot. In the semifinals, he faced Nieky Holzken and lost via unanimous decision.

On April 23, 2016, Stetsurenko took over Errol Koning of the Netherlands during W5 Grand Prix KITEK which was held in Moscow, finalizing a trilogy with Dutch opponent. Previous two bouts were chalked up in the favour of each of the fighters. In this Moscow title bout Stetsurenko won W5 World champion belt which after the fight he gave as a gift to a kid with restricted abilities who said that he is dreaming become a champion too. He defended the title during W5 Grand Prix KITEK XXXIX, against Vladimir Idranyi, by unanimous decision.

After winning the title, Stetsurenko participated in the KLF 80 kg tournament, held during Kunlun Fight 50. In the quarterfinals, he defeated Bo Fufan by decision. In the semifinals, he defeated Darryl Sichtman by unanimous decision. Alexander faced Dmitry Valent in the finals, and won by split decision.

== Titles ==
- 2016 Kunlun Fight 2016 (-80 kg) Tournament Champion.
- 2016 W5 World Champion (-81 kg)
- 2012 Tatneft Arena World Cup 2012 Champion (-80 kg)
- 2011 Forward Challenge– European Grand Prix Winner
- 2010 Tatneft Arena World Cup 2010 Champion (-80 kg)
- 2010 W5 World Champion (-81 kg)
- 2009 Tatneft Arena World Cup 2009 Champion (-80 kg)
- 2009 WBKF European Champion (-76 kg/167 lb)
- 2008 Tatneft Arena World Cup 2008 Champion (-80 kg)
- 3x Russian WAKO Kickboxing Champion
- Russian WAKO K-1 Champion

== Mixed martial arts record ==
Professional record breakdown
1 match	1 win	0 losses
By knockout	1	0

Res.	Record	Opponent	Method	Event	Date	Round	Time	Location	Notes
Win	1–0	Timur Nikulin	KO (punches)	AMC Fight Nights 108	January 28, 2022	2	2:32	Krasnogorsk, Russia	

== Professional kickboxing record ==
Professional Kickboxing Record
66 Wins (29 (T)KO's), 18 Losses, 0 Draw, 0 No Contest
Date	Result	Opponent	Event	Location	Method	Round	Time
2024-09-20	Loss	(Russia) Magomed Magomedov	Lotus Cup, Semifinal	Elista, Russia	Decision (Unanimous)	3	3:00
2022-11-18	Win	(Kazakhstan) Adilzhan Santibekov	REN TV Fight Club	Moscow, Russia	KO (Spinning back kick to the liver)	2	1:30
2022-04 -16	Loss	(Russia) Maxim Sulgin	Fair Fight 16	Yekaterinburg, Russia	Decision (Unanimous)	5	3:00
For the Fair Fight Welterweight (-77kg) title.
2021-12-13	Loss	(Brazil) Jonatan Oliveira	Tatneft Cup, -80 kg Final	Russia	Ext.R Decision	4	3:00
For the 2021 Tatneft Cup -80kg title.
2021-12-13	Win	(Russia) Vadim Apsit	Tatneft Cup, -80 kg Semi Finals	Russia	Ext.R Decision	4	3:00
2021-09-28	Win	(Turkey) Enis Yunusoğlu	Tatneft Cup, -80 kg Quarter Finals	Russia	Ext.R Decision	4	3:00
2019-06-29	Win	(China) Liu Dacheng	Wu Lin Feng 2019: WLF -67kg World Cup 2019-2020 1st Group Stage	Zhengzhou, China	Decision	3	3:00
2018-11-03	Win	(China) Fu Gaofeng	Wu Lin Feng 2018: WLF -67kg World Cup 2018-2019 5th Round	China	TKO (4 Knockdowns)	3	0:50
2018-08-05	Win	(Belarus) Pavel Provashinskiy	ACB KB-17	Russia	Decision (Unanimous)	3	3:00
2018-06-30	Win	(China) Liu Dacheng	Wu Lin Feng 2018: China vs Netherlands & Russia	Shenyang, China	Decision (Unanimous)	3	3:00
2018-04-20	Win	(Brazil) Jonatan Oliveira	ACB KB 15: Grand Prix Kitek	Moscow, Russia	Decision (Unanimous)	3	3:00
2017-11-24	Loss	(China) Caibao Zhang	-85 kg KFWC savate pro	France	DQ (Illegal Knee)	1	
2017-07-15	Win	(Belgium) Zakaria Baitar	ACB KB 10: Russia vs. China	Russia	TKO (Foot Injury)	2	
2017-03-25	Loss	(France) Cyril Benzaquen	ACB KB 9: Showdown in Paris	Paris, France	Decision (Unanimous)	3	3:00
2017-02-18	Win	(Slovakia) Vladimir Idranyi	W5 Grand Prix KITEK XXXIX	Moscow, Russia	Decision (Unanimous)	5	3:00
Defends W5 World Championship Title (-81 kg).
2016-12-10	Win	(Belarus) Dmitry Valent	Kunlun Fight 55 – 80 kg Tournament, Final	China	Decision (Split)	3	3:00
Wins Kunlun Fight 2016 (-80 kg) Tournament.
2016-12-10	Win	(Suriname) Darryl Sichtman	Kunlun Fight 55 – 80 kg Tournament, Semi Finals	China	Decision (Unanimous)	3	3:00
2016-08-20	Win	(China) Bo Fufan	Kunlun Fight 50 – 80 kg Tournament, Quarter Finals	Jinan, China	Decision	3	3:00
2016-07-15	Win	(China) Wang Zhiguo	Wu Lin Feng 2016 - Russia vs China	Zhengzhou, China	KO	1	
2016-06-05	Win	(Belgium) Alka Matewa	ACB KB 6: Battle in Brussels	Merchtem, Belgium	Decision	3	3:00
2016-04-24	Win	(Netherlands) Errol Koning	W5 Grand Prix KITEK XXXII	Moscow, Russia	TKO	3	
Wins W5 World Championship (-81 kg).
2016-03-20	Win	(Russia) Ruslan Kostin	Russian Challenge	Moscow, Russia	TKO	3	
2015-11-13	Loss	(Belgium) Zakaria Baitar	ACB KB 4: Grand Prix Final	Perm, Russia	TKO	1	1:59
2015-07-19	Loss	(China) Bai Jinbin	Kunlun Fight 28 – 80 kg Tournament, Quarter Finals	Nanjing, China	Decision (split)	3	3:00
2015-02-06	Loss	(Netherlands) Nieky Holzken	Glory 19: Virginia - Welterweight Contender Tournament, semifinals	Hampton, Virginia, USA	Decision (unanimous)	3	3:00
2014-12-13	Loss	(France) Karim Ghajji	Victory	Paris, France	Decision (Unanimous)	3	3:00
2014-11-16	Win	(China) Nuerla	Kunlun Fight 13	Hohhot, China	Decision (unanimous)	3	3:00
2014-09-12	Win	(Belarus) Sergey Parchinsky	King of the Hill (81 kg)	Moscow, Russia	Decision (Unanimous)	3	3:00
2014-03-01	Loss	(England) Paul Daley	Siam Warriors: Revolution on Leeside	Cork, Ireland	TKO (left cross)	1	0:40
2013-12-21	Win	(France) Karim Ghajji	Glory 13: Tokyo - Welterweight Tournament, Reserve Match	Tokyo, Japan	Decision (Unanimous)	3	3:00
2013-09-28	Loss	(Armenia) Karapet Karapetyan	Glory 10: Los Angeles	Ontario, California, USA	Decision (unanimous)	3	3:00
2013-06-16	Win	(Latvia) Zaurs Dzavadovs	Tech-KREP FC - battle of Stars 2 (77 kg)	Kaspiysk, Russia	TKO	2	
2013-03-23	Loss	(Netherlands) Errol Koning	R-1 - Fights Time (81 kg)	Rostov-on-Don, Russia	Decision (Split)	3	2:00
2012-12-16	Win	(Armenia) Karapet Karapetyan	Fight Nights: Battle of Moscow 9 (80 kg)	Moscow, Russia	Decision (majority)	3	3:00
2012-10-20	Win	(Netherlands) Hicham El Gaoui	Tatneft Arena World Cup 2012 final (80 kg)	Kazan, Russia	Decision (Unanimous)	4	3:00
Wins Tatneft Arena World Cup 2012 (-80 kg) title.
2012-07-19	Win	(Netherlands) Errol Koning	Tatneft Cup 2012 semifinal (80 kg)	Kazan, Russia	Decision (Unanimous)	4	3:00
2012-06-28	Win	(Belarus) Pavel Turuk	Dictator FC (81 kg)	Moscow, Russia	Decision (Unanimous)	3	3:00
2012-06-02	Win	(Morocco) Samir Al Mansouri	Tatneft Arena World Cup 2012 2nd selection 1/4 final (80 kg)	Kazan, Russia	Decision (Unanimous)	4	3:00
2012-04-14	Win	(Latvia) Mareks Lavrinovics	Fight Nights - Faxe Forward Challenge 2	Riga, Latvia	TKO (Injury)	2	1:12
2012-03-11	Win	(Belarus) Pavel Turuk	Best Fighter - Russia vs. Belarus (81 kg)	Samara, Russia	Decision (Unanimous)	3	3:00
2012-02-24	Win	(Lithuania) Tadas Jonkus	Tatneft Cup 2012 3rd Selection 1/8 final	Kazan, Russia	Decision	4	3:00
2011-11-26	Win	(Latvia) Mareks Lavrinovics	Forward Challenge– European Grand Prix K1 rules; Final	Riga, Latvia	TKO (Injury)	1	1:15
Wins Forward Challenge– European Grand Prix.
2011-11-26	Win	(Lithuania) Ernestas Dapkus	Forward Challenge– European Grand Prix K1 rules; semifinals	Riga, Latvia			
2011-11-26	Win	(Azerbaijan) Nahid Asadov	Forward Challenge– European Grand Prix K1 rules; quarterfinals	Riga, Latvia			
2011-11-12	Loss	(Netherlands) Hicham El Gaoui	Tatneft Cup 2011 Final (80 kg)	Kazan, Russia	Decision (Unanimous)	3	3:00
2011-10-20	Loss	(Belarus) Dmitry Shakuta	W5	Krasnodar, Russia	Decision	3	3:00
Lost W5 World Title -81 kg.
2011-07-23	Loss	(Ukraine) Alexander Oleinik	Tatneft Cup 2011 1/2 final (80 kg)	Kazan, Russia	Decision (Unanimous)	4	3:00
2011-04-28	Win	(Thailand) Wehaj Kingboxing	Tatneft Cup 2011 2nd selection 1/4 final (80 kg)	Kazan, Russia	KO	2	2:07
2011-04-09	Win	(Ukraine) Vasily Tereshonok	W5 Grand Prix K.O. (81 kg)	Moscow, Russia	Decision (Unanimous)	4	3:00
2011-03-22	Win	(Chile) Claudio Seguel	Tatneft Arena World Cup 2010 4th selection 1/8 final (80 kg)	Kazan, Russia	KO	2	1:15
2011-02-26	Win	(Russia) Alexey Kunchenko	Ice Storm 3 (81 kg)	Nefteyugansk, Russia	Decision (Unanimous)	3	3:00
2011-02-12	Win	(Azerbaijan) Vugar Kazimov	W5 League (81 kg)	Moscow, Russia	TKO	1	
2010-12-09	Win	(Slovenia) Miran Fabjan	WFC 12: Proteini.si Showtime	Ljubljana, Slovenia	KO	2	
2010-11-19	Loss	(Russia) Artem Levin	Battle of Champions V - 81 kg	Moscow, Russia	Decision (Unanimous)	3	3:00
2010-10-20	Win	(Russia) Artem Vakhitov	Tatneft Cup 2010 Part 7, Final	Kazan, Russia	Ext. R. Decision (Unanimous)	6	3:00
Wins Tatneft Cup 2010 -80 kg/176 lb Championship.
2010-07-29	Win	(Thailand) Plianphithak Kasemsan	Tatneft Arena World Cup 2010 1/2 final (80 kg)	Kazan, Russia	KO (Knee to the Head)	2	
2010-07-03	Win	(Russia) Vladimir Shulyak	Kickboxing Fights (81 kg)	Petropavlovsk-Kamchatsky, Russia	RTD	3	
2010-05-13	Win	(Slovakia) Marcel Jager	Tatneft Arena World Cup 2010 2nd selection 1/4 final (80 kg)	Kazan, Russia	KO	2	
2010-05-08	Win	(Thailand) Saiseelek Nor-Seepun	Star of Victory - United Rus vs Asia (81 kg)	Mytishchi, Russia	KO	1	2:40
Wins W5 World Title -81 kg.
2010-02-10	Win	(Lithuania) Ernestas Dapkus	Tatneft Arena World Cup 2010 3rd selection 1/8 final (80 kg)	Kazan, Russia	Decision (Unanimous)	3	3:00
2009-10-23	Win	(Russia) Artem Levin	Tatneft Arena European Cup 2009 final (80 kg)	Kazan, Russia	TKO (Corner Retirement)	4	3:00
Wins Tatneft European Cup 2009 (80kg) title. Levin down 2 times in round 4.
2009-09-16	Win	(Russia) Alexander Vinogradov	Tatneft Cup 2009 Semifinal (80 kg)	Kazan, Russia	RTD	2	
2009-06-25	Win	(Kyrgyzstan) Kumar Zhaliev	WBKF European -76 kg/167 lb Championships, Final	Moscow, Russia	KO	2	
Wins WBKF European -76 kg/167 lb Championship. Zhaliev down 2 times in round 2.
2009-06-25	Win	(Czech Republic) Anatoli Hunanyan	WBKF European -76 kg/167 lb Championships, semifinals	Moscow, Russia	KO	1	
2009-05-26	Win	(Belarus) Alexander Shlakunov	Tatneft Cup 2009 - 2nd selection 1/4 final (80 kg)	Kazan, Russia	KO	2	
2009-02-19	Win	(Netherlands) Ruben van Der Giessen	Tatneft Cup 2009 4th selection for 1/8 final (80 kg)	Kazan, Russia	KO (Right Hook)	1	
2008-08-29	Win	(Russia) Alexander Vinogradov	Tatneft Cup 2008 Final	Kazan, Russia	RTD (corner retirement)	5	
Wins Tatneft Arena World Cup 2008 (-80 kg) title. Vinogradov down 3 times in round 5.
2008-07-31	Win	(Russia) Alexander Romashko	4-men Tournament for WBKF Europe Title (81 kg)	Moscow, Russia	TKO	7	
2008-05-29	Win	(Russia) Alexander Kozlov	Tatneft Cup 2008 Semifinal (80 kg)	Kazan, Russia	RTD	2	
2008-04-29	Win	(Russia) Nedzhiev Emirbeckov	Tatneft Cup 2008 - 2nd selection 1/4 final (80 kg)	Kazan, Russia	RTD	2	
2008-03-28	Loss	(Russia) Artem Levin	Tournament of Real Men 12	Ekaterinburg, Russia	Decision (Unanimous)	5	3:00
For The WMC Intercontinental (-76kg) title.
2008-02-08	Win	(Russia) Magomed Ismailov	Tatneft Cup 2008 - 4th selection 1/8 final (80 kg)	Kazan, Russia	KO	2	
2007-12-14	Loss	(Russia) Shamil Abasov	Confederation Cup, semifinals (86 kg)	Samara, Russia	Decision	3	3:00
2007-12-14	Win	(Russia) Gamzat Isalmagomedov	Confederation Cup, quarterfinals (86 kg)	Samara, Russia	Decision	3	3:00
2006-11-10	Win	(Russia) Alexei Petrov	Muaythai Night (82 kg)	St. Petersburg, Russia	TKO	1 (5)	
2006-06-11	Win	(Belarus) Pavel Turuk	Muaythai Night (82 kg)	St. Petersburg, Russia	Decision	5	2:00
2005-05-02	Win	(Russia) Evgeny Mishin	Oskal (75 kg)	Volgograd, Russia	Decision (Unanimous)	3	3:00
Legend: Win Loss Draw/No contest Notes

== Boxing record ==
1 Wins (0 knockouts, 1 decisions), 1 Losses, 0 Draws
Res.	Record	Opponent	Type	Rd., Time	Date	Location	Notes
Win	1-1	(Ukraine) Maksym Stasiuk	UD	4 (4)	2010-01-31	(Russia) Big Bar, Almetyevsk	
Loss	0-1	(Russia) David Gogiya	UD	6 (6)	2006-06-18	(Russia) Samara	Professional boxing debout.

== See also ==
- List of male kickboxers
