= Fang Bian =

Chinese Sanshou kickboxer

- Born: September 1, 1983 (age 43); Bengbu, Anhui, China
- Native name: 方便
- Other names: Azrael
- Nationality: Chinese
- Height: 1.83 m (6 ft 0 in)
- Weight: 80 kg (180 lb; 13 st)
- Division: Middleweight; Welterweight
- Style: Sanda
- Stance: Orthodox
- Team: Shanghai Xingwu Fighting Club
- Years active: 2007-present

Kickboxing record
- Total: 61
- Wins: 61
- By knockout: 23
- Losses: 0
- By knockout: 0
- Draws: 0
- Last updated on: 2024

Fang Bian (Chinese: 方便; pinyin: fāng biàn) is a retired Chinese Sanda kickboxer. He was born on September 1, 1983, in Huaiyuan, Anhui, China and graduated from Jilin Institute of Physical Education. In 2017, he was ranked the #8 middleweight in the world by CombatPress.com.

== Career ==
On May 24, 2014, in Xinyang Stadium on Yokkao 9: China vs. Muay Thai, Fang Bian beat Carl N'Diaye.

On January 31, 2015, in Wu Lin Feng, Fang Bian beat Simon Marcus by TKO .

On January 23, 2016, in Wu Lin Feng, Fang Bian beat Cedric Doumbe by decision.

On June 26, 2016, in the WKM world tournament, Fang Bian beat Ashkan Tahmasebi the Iranian world Kickboxing Champion by decision.

Topking World Series returned to China on November 27, 2016, with their eleventh event, where Fang Bian beat Akhmet Alimbekov.

== Championships and awards ==
- Kickboxing
  - 2014 WKF World champion -80 kg
  - 2014 WLF Men's intercontinental champion -80 kg
  - 2014 IWSD World Champion -80 kg
- Sanda
  - 2009 11th Chinese National Games Sanda Preliminary contest (gold) -77.5 kg
  - 2008 Chinese Sanda Championship (silver) -80 kg
  - 2007 Chinese Sanda Championship (silver) -80 kg
  - 2006 Chinese Sanda Championship (silver) -80 kg
  - 2005 Chinese Sanda Championship (silver) -80 kg
  - 2004 Chinese Sanda Championship (silver) -80 kg

Awards

- Combat Press
  - 2015 Upset of the Year (vs. Simon Marcus)

== Kickboxing record ==
Professional kickboxing record
61 wins (23 KOs), 0 losses
Date	Result	Opponent	Event	Location	Method	Round	Time
2020-07-18	Win	(China) Yu Jianhong	Zhenhua Hero	China	Decision	3	3:00
2019-09-29	Win	(Brazil) Natã Willian Gomes	David Group event	Macau, China	Decision	3	3:00
2017-01-14	Win	(Germany) Berat Aliu	Wu Lin Feng World Championship 2017	Zhengzhou, China	Decision (unanimous)	3	3:00
2016-12-17	Win	(Iran) Hamid Reza	2016 Faith Fighting World Championships	Zhanjiang, China	Decision (unanimous)	3	3:00
2016-11-27	Win	(Uzbekistan) Akhmet Alimbekov	Topking World Series 2016: TK 11	Nanchang, China	KO (punches)	2	2:00
2016-09-10	Win	(Germany) Vadalma Weber	Wu Lin Feng 2016: World Kickboxing Championship in Shenzhen	Shenzhen, China	Decision (unanimous)	3	3:00
2016-06-24	Win	(Iran) Ashkan Tahmasebi	WKM 2016 World Tournament	Chongqing, China	Decision (unanimous)	3	3:00
2016-01-23	Win	(France) Cedric Doumbe	Wu Lin Feng 2016: World Kickboxing Championship in Shangha	Shanghai, China	Ext. R decision (split)	4	3:00
2015-12-12	Win	(Russia) Isakov Nadir	Wu Lin Feng 2015	Beijing, China	Decision (unanimous)	3	3:00
2015-11-07	Win	(Portugal) Ricardo	2015 Silk Road Hero Championship	Taiyuan, China	Decision (unanimous)	3	3:00
2015-10-17	Win	(France) Cheick Sidibé	Wu Lin Feng World Championship 2015	Zhengzhou, China	Decision (unanimous)	3	3:00
2015-10-02	Win	(Croatia) DWEISDF	2015 Nanxi international Championship	Sichuan, China	KO (punches)	1	0:35
2015-09-05	Win	(Belarus) Aliaksandr Sviryd	Wu Lin Feng 2015	Guangzhou, China	Decision (unanimous)	3	3:00
2015-08-08	Win	(India) Abel	2015 Zhenhua Hero Tournament	Chongqing, China	TKO (referee stoppage)	1	
2015-07-18	Win	(France) Bellah	2015 Battle Dongting Lake International Tournament	Xiangyin, Hunan, China	Decision (unanimous)	3	3:00
2015-06-21	Win	(Thailand) Sonchai Me.mai	Wu Lin Feng 2015	Chengdu, Sichuan, China	Decision (unanimous)	3	3:00
2015-05-02	Win	(South Korea) Kim Han Eol	Wu Lin Feng 2015	Xingyang, Henan, China	TKO	1	1:29
2015-03-28	Win	(Belarus) Posy Kerr	Wu Lin Feng 2015	Zhumadian, Henan, China	TKO	2	2:00
2015-02-06	Win	(France) Oh Bella	Hero Soul World Championship 2015	Linyi, Shandong, China	Decision (unanimous)	3	3:00
2015-01-31	Win	(Canada) Simon Marcus	Wu Lin Feng World Championship 2015	Chongqing, China	TKO (referee stoppage)	2	1:05
2014-12-27	Win	(Russia) Magomedov Lasseur	Wu Lin Feng 2014	Pingdingshan, Henan, China	Decision (unanimous)	3	3:00
2014-11-29	Win	(Canada) Cullens	WKF World Championship 2014	Xiamen, China	KO (right straight)	1	2:50
Wins the WKF World Champion title -80 kg.
2014-11-21	Win	(Russia) Yevgeniy Borowcove	Wu Lin Feng 2014	Xiaogan, Hubei, China	TKO (doctor stop)	2	1:20
2014-11-14	Win	(Iran) Mojtaba Hosseinzabeh	Wu Lin Feng 2014	Changsha, China	KO (after turning kick)	2	1:00
2014-10-04	Win	(United States) Allison Guha	Wu Lin Feng 2014	Wenling, Zhejiang, China	TKO (corner stop)	1	0:40
Wins the WLF International Title -80 kg.
2014-09-21	Win	(Japan) Yabiku Kazuya	Peng Cheng Jue: China vs Japan	Shenzhen, China	TKO (referee stoppage)	1	1:24
2014-07-18	Win	(Thailand) Paruiyong	Wu Lin Feng 2014	Dingyuan, Anhui, China	Decision (unanimous)	3	3:00
2014-05-24	Win	(France) Carl N'Diaye	Wu Lin Feng & Yokkao 9	Xinyang, Henan, China	Decision (unanimous)	3	3:00
2014-01-18	Win	(Japan) Yuki Kudo	Wu Lin Feng World Championship 2014	Xiangyang, Hubei, China	TKO (referee stoppage)	3	
2014-01-11	Win	(France) Oh Bella Pollitt	Hongdu Real estate & Qiancheng group Championship	Dalian, China	Decision (unanimous)	3	3:00
Wins the IWSD World Champion Title. -80 kg
2013-12-31	Win	(Thailand) Khomsan Hanchana	WKC World Championship 2013	Jilin, China	Ext. R decision (unanimous)	4	3:00
2013-12-14	Win	(Canada) Langlois Olivier	Changsha World Championship 2013	Changsha, China	Decision (unanimous)	3	3:00
2013-11-27	Win	(Thailand) Ahbai	Wu Lin Feng 2013	Anyang, Henan, China	KO (punches)	2	0:19
2013-09-18	Win	(Zimbabwe) Blood diamond Mike	Wu Lin Feng 2013	Linquan, Anhui, China	Decision (unanimous)	3	3:00
2013-08-24	Win	(Thailand) Wisrichai	Wu Lin Feng 2013	Huaibei, Anhui, China	Decision (unanimous)	3	3:00
2013-06-06	Win	(Belgium) Alka Matewa	Wu Lin Feng 2013	Dubai, United Arab Emirates	Decision (unanimous)	3	3:00
2013-05-06	Win	(Republic of Ireland) Ronan Dennis	Wu Lin Feng 2013	Nanyang, Henan, China	Decision (unanimous)	3	3:00
2013-03-31	Win	(Brazil) Michael Andre	Wu Lin Feng 2013	Wenling, Zhejiang, China	KO (punches)	1	
2013-02-02	Win	(South Korea) Kim Se-Ki	Wu Lin Feng VS THE KHAN	Seoul, Korea	KO (punches)	3	
2012-12-31	Win	(Thailand) Kaoklai Kaennorsing	Wu Lin Feng 2012	Beijing, China	Decision (unanimous)	3	3:00
2012-10-20	Win	(Russia) Artur Temishev	Wu Lin Feng 2012	Zhengzhou, China	Decision (unanimous)	3	3:00
2012-09-25	Win	(United Kingdom) Gary Williams	2012 Guangyuan International Tournament	Hefei, China	Decision (unanimous)	3	3:00
2012-06-23	Win	(France) Samuel Jeanfred	Wu Lin Feng 2012	Foshan, China	Decision (unanimous)	3	3:00
2012-04-28	Win	(Germany) Sammy Masa	2012 Wu Lin Feng & Day of Destruction 5	Hamburg, Germany	Decision (unanimous)	3	3:00
2012-03-31	Win	(Japan) Kenta Takagi	2012 Wu Lin Feng China VS Japan	Zhengzhou, China	KO	3	
2012-01-14	Win	(United States) Edgar	Wu Lin Feng 2012	Hebi, Henan, China	Decision (unanimous)	3	3:00
2011-10-22	Win	(United States) Shawn Yarborough	Wu Lin Feng: China vs USA	Las Vegas, USA	Decision (unanimous)	3	3:00
2011-08-20	Win	(Japan) Manabu	2011 Wu Lin Feng China VS Japan and Germany	Zhengzhou, China	KO	1	
2011-06-25	Win	(United States) Tom Brennan	2011 Wu Lin Feng China VS USA	Zhengzhou, China	KO	1	
2011-06-11	Win	(New Zealand) Slava Alexichek	2011 Wu Lin Feng China VS New Zealand	Shangqiu, Henan, China	KO	3	1:20
2011-05-01	Win	(Thailand) Saiseelek.Nor-Seepun	2011 Wu Lin Feng China VS Thailand	Zhengzhou, China	Decision (unanimous)	3	3:00
2011-04-02	Win	(China) Sun Tongjian	Wu Lin Feng 2011	Zhengzhou, China	TKO	1	
2011-03-26	Win	(China) Ma Chuang	Wu Lin Feng 2011	Zhengzhou, China	TKO	1	
2011-03-19	Win	(China) Wu Zhonghai	Wu Lin Feng 2011	Zhengzhou, China	Decision (unanimous)	3	3:00
2011-01-15	Win	(Japan) Yuki Kudo	Wu Lin Feng 2011	Hebi, Henan, China	TKO	3	
2011-01-08	Win	(China) Li Baoming	Wu Lin Feng 2011	Zhengzhou, China	Decision (unanimous)	3	3:00
2011-01-02	Win	(China) Liu Hongao	Wu Lin Feng 2011	Zhengzhou, China	Decision (unanimous)	3	3:00
2009-11-21	Win	(China) Qing Gele	Wu Lin Feng 2009	Zhengzhou, China	TKO	2	
2009-07-18	Win	(China) Wu Hao	Wu Lin Feng 2009	Zhengzhou, China	Decision (unanimous)	3	3:00
2009-05-24	Win	(Brazil) Luis Carlo Bonali	Wu Lin Feng 2009	Zhengzhou, China	Decision (unanimous)	3	3:00
2009-01-17	Win	(Brazil) Brett Juggernaut Whitton	Wu Lin Feng 2009	Luoyang, China	Decision (unanimous)	3	3:00
Legend: Win Loss Draw/no contest Notes

== Sanda record (incomplete) ==
Professional kickboxing record
Known fights
Date	Result	Opponent	Event	Location	Method	Round	Time
2008-11-29	Loss	(China) Bian Maofu	2008 Chinese Wushu Sanda King Tournament	Harbin, China	Decision (unanimous)	3	3:00
2008-11-14	Win	(China) Aotegen Bateer	2008 Chinese Wushu Sanda King Tournament	Harbin, China	Decision (unanimous)	3	3:00
2008-11-02	Win	(China) Zhang Kaiyin	2008 Chinese Wushu Sanda King Tournament	Harbin, China	Decision (unanimous)	3	3:00
2008-10-26	Win	(China) Fu Gaofeng	2008 Chinese Wushu Sanda King Tournament	Harbin, China	Decision (unanimous)	3	3:00
2007-08-01	Loss	(Russia) Muslim Salikhov	2007 China vs Russia Sanshou Tournament	Harbin, China	Decision (unanimous)	3	3:00
2007-03-25	Loss	(China) Bai Jinbin	2007 KFK Wushu International tournament	Chongqing, China	Decision (unanimous)	3	3:00
KFK Wushu International tournament final -80 kg.
2007-03-23	Win	(Italy) Chofalo Daniele	2007 KFK Wushu International tournament	Chongqing, China	Decision (unanimous)	3	3:00
