= Tayfun Özcan =

Dutch-Turkish kickboxer

- Born: August 11, 1991 (age 35); Tilburg, Netherlands
- Other names: The Turkish Turbine
- Nationality: Dutch; Turkish
- Height: 178 cm (5 ft 10 in)
- Weight: 70.0 kg (154.3 lb; 11.02 st)
- Style: Kickboxing
- Fighting out of: Utrecht, Netherlands
- Team: SB Gym (former); Siam Gym
- Trainer: Said El Badaoui

Kickboxing record
- Total: 105
- Wins: 89
- By knockout: 28
- Losses: 13
- By knockout: 4
- Draws: 3
- Last updated on: 12 September 2020

Tayfun Özcan is a Dutch-Turkish kickboxer, born and raised in Tilburg, Netherlands. He is the former Enfusion 72.5 kg and 70 kg World champion.

Tayfun holds notable wins over Andy Souwer, Davit Kiria, Mohamed Khamal, Amansio Paraschiv, Endy Semeleer, Jonay Risco and Mohammed Jaraya.

== Kickboxing career ==
=== Enfusion ===
Ozcan won his first major kickboxing title in 2015, with a fifth-round knockout victory over Fran Palenzuela, winning the Enfusion 72.5 kg title.

In the following year Tayfun participated in the Enfusion 70 kg MAX Tournament. In the semi-final bout he fought Madicke Kamara. Kamara retired from the fight at the end of the second round. In the final Özcan fought a rematch with Mohammed Jaraya, winning the fight, and the tournament, through a unanimous decision.

Özcan next participated in the Kunlun Fight World MAX Tournament Final 16 qualification. After beating Davit Kiria in the first round through a decision, Özcan would suffer a second round left hook KO in the following bout, at the hands of Wu Xuesong.

In 2018 Tayfun fought Andy Souwer for the Enfusion 72.5 kg World title. He once again captured the title with a fourth-round KO win. He defended his title twice, with a third-round TKO victory over Ardalan Sheikholeslam, and a decision victory, over the then 75 kg champion, Endy Semeleer.

He briefly left Enfusion to fight for the Arena Fight 72 kg title against Mohamed Hendouf. Özcan won the fight by a unanimous decision.

During Enfusion 92 Tayfun attempted to become a two weight Enfusion world champion, when he challenged the reigning 70 kg title holder Jonay Risco to a rematch. Özcan won the fight by a unanimous decision.

=== ONE Championship ===
In February 2020, Ozcan signed with ONE Championship. He was supposed to debut at ONE: Big Bang, but was forced to withdraw due to an injury.

Ozcan was scheduled to make his debut at ONE Championship: Battleground on 30 July 2021, against Sitthichai Sitsongpeenong. However, Ozcan was forced with withdraw due to an injury and Sitthichai was rescheduled to face Tawanchai P.K. Saenchaimuaythaigym at ONE Championship: Battleground 3 instead.

==== Featherweight Kickboxing Grand Prix ====
Özcan was scheduled to face Sitthichai Sitsongpeenong in the quarterfinals of the ONE Featherweight Grand Prix, which was held at ONE Championship: First Strike on 15 October 2021. Özcan lost to Sitthichai by split decision.

==== Post-Grand Prix ====
Özcan faced Enriko Kehl at ONE: Full Circle on 25 February 2022. He won the bout via unanimous decision.

Özcan was expected to face the former Glory lightweight champion Marat Grigorian at ONE on Prime Video 2 on 30 September 2022. On 21 September, Özcan was rescheduled to Superbon Singha Mawynn for the ONE Kickboxing Featherweight Championship as a short-notice replacement for the injured Chingiz Allazov. Özcan was later once again booked to face Grigorian, as Yusupov and Superbon both failed the pre-fight medical, held the day before the event. He lost the fight by unanimous decision.

Özcan faced Ali Baniasad at Enfusion #119 - 10 Year Anniversary on 11 February 2023. He won the fight by a second-round technical knockout.

Özcan competed in a featherweight kickboxing match against Superbon Banchamek at ONE Fight Night 11 on 9 June 2023. He lost the fight by second-round knockout, getting knocked out with a head kick.

=== GLORY ===
Özcan made his Glory debut against Majid Amarouche at Glory 93 on 20 July 2024. He won the fight by unanimous decision.

On 7 December 2024, Özcan faced Younes Smaili at Glory Collision 7. He lost the fight by split decision.

Özcan was expected to face Ismail Ouzgni at Glory 100 - Day One on 13 June 2025. The fight was later cancelled.

Özcan faced Don Sno at Glory 103 on 23 August 2025. He lost via split decision.

== Titles and accomplishments ==
- Arena Fight
  - 2019 Arena Fight Kickboxing Champion (-72.000 kg)
- Enfusion
  - 2019 Enfusion "Male Fighter of the Year"
  - 2019 Enfusion -70 kg World Champion (One time, former)
  - 2016 Enfusion 16-Man 70 kg World MAX Tournament Champion
  - 2015 Enfusion 72.5 kg World Champion (Two times, former)
    - Two successful title defenses
  - 2015 Enfusion 2015 70 kg Tournament Champion

== Fight record ==
Professional Kickboxing Record
89 Wins (29 (T)KO's), 13 Losses, 3 Draw, No Contest
Date	Result	Opponent	Event	Location	Method	Round	Time
2026-11-28		(Morocco) Anouar Afakir	Glory Rivals 6	Den Bosch, Netherlands			
2026-10-10	Win	(Morocco) Yassin Airad	Sportmani Events – ‘Don’t Call It A Comeback II’	Almere, Netherlands	Decision (unanimous)	3	3:00
2025-08-23	Loss	(Suriname) Don Sno	Glory 103	Rotterdam, Netherlands	Decision (Split)	3	3:00
2025-01-25	Win	(China) Chen Yonghui	Wu Lin Feng 2025 Global Kung Fu Festival	Tangshan, China	Decision	3	3:00
2024-12-07	Loss	(Morocco) Younes Smaili	Glory Collision 7	Arnhem, Netherlands	Decision (Split)	3	3:00
2024-07-20	Win	(France) Majid Amarouche	Glory 93	Rotterdam, Netherlands	Decision (Unanimous)	3	3:00
2023-06-10	Loss	(Thailand) Superbon Singha Mawynn	ONE Fight Night 11	Bangkok, Thailand	KO (Head kick)	2	1:46
2023-02-11	Win	(Germany) Ali Baniasad	Enfusion #119 - 10 Year Anniversary	Nijmegen, Netherlands	TKO (Referee stoppage)	2	2:55
2022-10-01	Loss	(Armenia) Marat Grigorian	ONE on Prime Video 2	Kallang, Singapore	Decision (Unanimous)	3	3:00
2022-02-25	Win	(Germany) Enriko Kehl	ONE: Full Circle	Kallang, Singapore	Decision (Unanimous)	3	3:00
2021-10-15	Loss	(Thailand) Sitthichai Sitsongpeenong	ONE Championship: First Strike	Kallang, Singapore	Decision (Split)	3	3:00
Kickboxing Featherweight Grand Prix Quarter-final
2020-02-29	Win	(Spain) Daniel Moscardo	Enfusion 96	Eindhoven, Netherlands	Decision (Unanimous)	3	3:00
2019-12-06	Win	(Spain) Jonay Risco	Enfusion 92	Abu Dhabi, United Arab Emirates	Decision (Unanimous)	5	3:00
Wins the Enfusion -70kg title.
2019-10-26	Win	(Spain) Edye Ruiz	Enfusion #89	Wuppertal, Germany	Decision (Unanimous)	3	3:00
2019-06-08	Win	(Belgium) Mohamed Hendouf	Arena Fight	France	Decision (Unanimous)	5	3:00
Wins Arena Fight Kickboxing Title (-72.000 kg).
2019-02-23	Win	(Curaçao) Endy Semeleer	Enfusion Live 79	Netherlands	Decision	5	3:00
Defends the Enfusion -72.5kg Title.
2018-10-27	Win	(Romania) Amansio Paraschiv	Enfusion 73	Germany	Decision	3	3:00
2018-09-29	Win	(Iran) Ardalan Sheikholeslam	Enfusion 71	Germany	TKO (Referee Stoppage/Cut)	3	0:33
Defends the Enfusion -72.5kg Title.
2018-06-23	Win	(Morocco) Mohamed Khamal	Enfusion 69	Netherlands	TKO (Four Knockdowns/Right Hooks)	3	1:40
2018-02-17	Win	(Netherlands) Andy Souwer	Enfusion Live 62	Amsterdam	KO (Overhand Right)	4	2:12
Defends the Enfusion -72.5kg Title.
2017-11-11	Win	(Thailand) Petchchaiyo Banchamek	Enfusion Live 55 Final 16	Amsterdam	Decision	3	3:00
2017-09-30	Win	(Netherlands) Redouan Laarkoubi	Enfusion Live 53	Belgium	TKO (Referee Stoppage/Punches)	1	1:24
2017-08-05	Win	(Morocco) Ilyass Chakir	Fight League 7	Morocco	Decision (Unanimous)	3	3:00
2017-04-29	Win	(Morocco) Nordin Ben Moh	Enfusion Live 46	Zoetermeer, Netherlands	KO (Punches)	2	1:23
2017-02-18	Loss	(Spain) Jonay Risco	Enfusion Live 45	Eindhoven, Netherlands	TKO (Doctor stoppage/shin cut)	2	1:21
2016-11-20	Win	(Suriname) Serginio Kanters	Enfusion Live 43	Groningen, Netherlands	Decision	3	3:00
2016-09-19	Win	(Morocco) Mohammed Jaraya	Enfusion Live 41	Antwerp, Belgium	Decision	3	3:00
2016-04-08	Loss	(China) Wu Xuesong	Kunlun Fight 41 - Group 7, Final	China	KO (Left Hook)	2	0:21
Failed to Qualify for Kunlun Fight 2016 70kg World MAX Tournament Final 16.
2016-04-08	Win	(Georgia (country)) Davit Kiria	Kunlun Fight 41 - Group 7, Semi-finals	China	Decision (unanimous)	3	3:00
2016-02-27	Win	(Morocco) Mohammed Jaraya	Enfusion Live 37 MAX Final	Eindhoven, Netherlands	Decision	3	3:00
Won Enfusion 16-Man 70kg MAX Tournament.
2016-02-27	Win	(France) Madicke Kamara	Enfusion Live 37 MAX Semi-finals	Eindhoven, Netherlands	TKO (Opponent Gave Up)	2	3:00
2015-11-21	Win	(Netherlands) William Diender	Enfusion Live 34	Groningen, Netherlands	Decision (Unanimous)	3	3:00
2015-09-19	Win	(Spain) Fran Palenzuela	Enfusion Live 31	Málaga, Spain	KO	5	3:00
Won Enfusion 72.5kg World Title.
2015-05-24	Win	(Morocco) Aziz Kallah	Enfusion Live 29 70 kg tournament Final	Amsterdam, Netherlands	Decision (Unanimous)	3	3:00
Won Enfusion 2015 70kg Tournament.
2015-05-24	Win	(Morocco) Redouan Larkoubi	Enfusion Live 29 70 kg tournament Semi-finals	Amsterdam, Netherlands	KO (Right+Left Hook)	1	3:00
2015-04-06	Win	(Netherlands) William Diender	Born 2 Fight	Elst, Netherlands	TKO (Retirement)	1	3:00
2015-02-07	Loss	(Morocco) Mohammed Jaraya	Enfusion Live 24	Eindhoven, Netherlands	Extra Round Decision	4	3:00
2014-12-21	Win	(Morocco) Ismael Benali	Enfusion Live 23	Antwerp, Belgium	TKO	2	3:00
2014-11-30	Win	(Cambodia) Sen Bunthen	Pradal Serey Cambodian Stadium	Cambodia	Decision	3	3:00
2014-09-20	Loss	(Armenia) Harut Grigorian	A1 World Combat Cup - Final 8, Semi-finals	Eindhoven, Netherlands	Decision	3	3:00
2014-09-20	Win	(Morocco) Mo Ben Nasser	A1 World Combat Cup - Final 8, Quarter-finals	Eindhoven, Netherlands	KO	1	1:03
2014-06-07	Win	(Cambodia) Sen Bunthen	Rencontre Internationale Kun Khmer	Loon-Plage, France	Decision	3	3:00
2014-05-17	Win	(Netherlands) Marcel Verhaar	A1 World Combat Cup - Final 16	Eindhoven, Netherlands	KO	2	3:00
2014-04-22	Win	(Netherlands) Jay Da Vega	Enfusion Live - Sportmani Events V	Eindhoven, Netherlands	Decision	3	3:00
2014-02-08	Draw	(Belgium) Arman Hambaryan	Nuit des Spartiates	France	Decision	5	3:00
2014-01-12	Win	(Georgia (country)) Giga Chikadze	Enfusion Live 12	Alkmaar, Netherlands	Decision (Unanimous)	3	3:00
2013-09-28	Win	(Netherlands) Wael Karoumi	A1 World Combat Cup	Eindhoven, Netherlands	Decision	3	3:00
2013-06-01	Draw	(Belgium) Yassin Baitar	N-1 Challenge Fight Night	Belgium	Decision	3	3:00
2013-05-11	Win	(Thailand) Pajonsuk SuperPro Samui	Enfusion Live 5	Eindhoven, Netherlands	Decision	3	3:00
2013-03-03	Draw	(Belgium) Edgard Nzunga	Ikuza 2	Brussels, Belgium	Decision	3	3:00
2013-02-16	Win	(Morocco) Mo Bennasser	Sportmani Events IV	Amsterdam, Netherlands	Decision (Unanimous)	5	3:00
2012-10-06	Loss	(France) Fabio Pinca	Time Fight 2	Tours, France	TKO (broken arm)	3	3:00
2012-09-22	Win	(Morocco) Hicham Boubarki	A-1 World Combat Cup	Eindhoven, Netherlands	TKO (Referee stoppage)	2	
2012-06-10	Loss	(Morocco) Nordin Ben Moh	Cobra Night	Belgium	TKO	3	3:00
2012-05-06	Win	(Belgium) Naïm Dahou	Force & Honneur	Brussels, Belgium	Decision	5	3:00
2012-04-14	Win	(Belgium) Mohamed Bouzagou	Time Fight	Brussels, Belgium	Decision	5	3:00
Won 2012 Benelux 70 kg Title.
2012-04-07	Win	(Netherlands) Petros Sedarous	A1 World Combat Cup	Eindhoven, Netherlands	Decision	3	3:00
2012-03-04	Win	(Belgium) Alka Matewa	Force & Honneur	Brussels, Belgium	Decision	3	3:00
2012-02-26	Win	(Netherlands) Omar Baqi	Vuisten Van Vuur	's-Hertogenbosch, Netherlands	Decision	3	3:00
2011-12-23	Win	(Netherlands) Dennis Esajas	Klaar Omte Bossen!	Paramaribo, Suriname	KO	2	
2011-10-01	Win	(Netherlands) Twan Aarts	Judgement Day III	Panningen, Netherlands	Decision	3	3:00
2011-06-05	Loss	(Belgium) Yassin Baitar	FightSensation	Beveren, Belgium	Decision	3	3:00
2011-04-09	Win	(Belgium) Quincy Kerraigde	A1 World Combat Cup	Eindhoven, Netherlands	Decision	3	3:00
2011-01-29	Loss	(Netherlands) Robbie Hageman	FightSensation	Eindhoven, Netherlands	Decision	3	3:00
Legend: Win Loss Draw/No contest Notes

== See also ==
- List of male kickboxers
