= E Meidie =

Chinese kickboxer

- Born: 鄂美蝶 (È Měidié); 30 April 1986 (age 40); Zhuanghe, Liaoning, China
- Nationality: Chinese
- Height: 1.62 m (5 ft 4 in)
- Weight: 52 kg (115 lb; 8 st 3 lb)
- Division: Strawweight
- Style: Sanda, Kickboxing
- Fighting out of: Zhuanghe, Liaoning, China
- Years active: 2005-2018

Kickboxing record
- Total: 33
- Wins: 28
- Losses: 4
- Draws: 1

E Meidie (born 30 April 1986) is a retired Chinese Sanda kickboxer. She is the 2015 Kunlun Fight Strawweight Tournament champion, a two time World Wushu Championships and one time Asian Games Wushu Gold medalist.

She was ranked in Combat Press' top ten from November 2016, when female rankings were introduced, until May 2018, when E retired from kickboxing and transitioned into coaching.

== Kickboxing career ==
Following a successful career in Wushu, winning eight gold medals across various competitions, E made her kickboxing transition in 2015. Her accolades in Wushu garnered the attention of Kunlun Fight with whom E signed her first professional contract.

E Meidie participated in the four woman strawweight tournament organized by Kunlun Fight. In the semi-final bout she won a unanimous decision against Ji Won Lee, and faced Jemyma Betrian in the finals. The undefeated Betrian would win a unanimous decision.

In her next fight E fought the WBO title challenger Corina Carlescu, winning the fight by a unanimous decision.

E participated in the 2015 Kunlun Fight strawweight tournament. She won unanimous decisions against Isis Verbeek in the semi-final, and Anissa Meksen in the finals.

== Championships and accomplishments ==
=== Wushu ===
- (gold) 2005 Chinese National Wushu Championships -52 kg
- (bronze) 2005 East Asian Games -52 kg
- (gold) 2007 World Wushu Championships -56 kg
- (gold) 2007 Taurus Gary Cup National Sanda Championships -52 kg
- (gold) 2008 Chinese National Wushu Championships -56 kg
- (gold) 2009 World Wushu Championships -52kg
- (gold) 2009 World Games - 52kg
- (gold) 2010 Asian Games -52kg
- (gold) 2010 World Combat Games -52 kg

=== Kickboxing ===
- 2015 Kunlun Fight 4-Woman Strawweight Tournament Champion - 52kg
- 2014 Kunlun Fight 4-Women Strawweight Tournament Runner-up - 52kg

== Kickboxing record ==
Professional Kickboxing Record
28 Wins (10 (T)KO's), 4 Losses, 1 Draw, 0 No Contest
Date	Result	Opponent	Event	Location	Method	Round	Time
2015-10-28	Win	(France) Anissa Meksen	Kunlun Fight 32, Tournament Final	Hong Kong, Hong Kong	Decision (Unanimous)	3	3:00
Wins the Kunlun Fight 4-Women Strawweight Tournament.
2015-10-28	Win	(Netherlands) Isis Verbeek	Kunlun Fight 32, Tournament Semi-final	Hong Kong, Hong Kong	Decision (Unanimous)	3	3:00
2015-7-18	Win	(Belarus) Palianskaya Viktoria	Kunlun Fight 27, Tournament Quarter-finals	Nanjing, China	Decision (Unanimous)	3	3:00
2015-4-26	Win	(Russia) Valeriya Drozdova	Kunlun Fight 23	Changsha, China	Decision (Unanimous)	3	3:00
2015-2-1	Win	(Japan) Syuri	K-1 China vs. Japan	Changsha, Hunan, China	Decision (Unanimous)	3	3:00
2015-1-1	Win	(Serbia) Sanja Sucevic	K-1 China vs. USA	Changsha, Hunan, China	Decision (Unanimous)	3	3:00
2015-1-3	Win	(Japan) Yoshimi Ohama	Kunlun Fight 15	Nanjing, China	KO	2	
2014-12-4	Win	(Russia) Lyazzat Akylova	Kunlun Fight 14	Bangkok, Thailand	KO (Body Punch)	2	
2014-10-5	Win	(Romania) Corina Carlescu	Kunlun Fight 11	Macau, China	Decision (Unanimous)	3	3:00
2014-3-30	Loss	(Netherlands) Jemyma Betrian	Kunlun Fight 3, Tournament Final	Harbin, China	Decision (Unanimous)	3	3:00
2014-3-30	Win	(South Korea) Ji Won Lee	Kunlun Fight 3, Tournament Semi-Final	Harbin, China	Decision (Unanimous)	3	3:00
Legend: Win Loss Draw/No contest Notes

== See also ==
- List of female kickboxers
