= Bai Jinbin =

Chinese Sanshou kickboxer

- Born: November 1, 1985 (age 40); Heze, Shandong, China
- Native name: 白近斌
- Other names: Dragon Lohan
- Nationality: Chinese
- Height: 1.82 m (5 ft 11 1/2 in)
- Weight: 80 kg (180 lb; 13 st)
- Division: Middleweight; Welterweight
- Style: Sanda
- Stance: Orthodox
- Team: Fengtai Sports School Beijing
- Years active: 2007-present
- Last updated on: January 28, 2017

Bai Jinbin (Chinese: 白近斌; pinyin: Bái Jìnbīn) is a Hui, Chinese Sanda kickboxer who was born on November 1, 1985, in Heze, Shandong, China and graduated from the Beijing Shichahai Sports School. As of November 2015, he is ranked the #10 Welterweight in the world by Combat Press. As of December 2015, he is ranked the #10 Welterweight in the world by LiverKick.

== Championships and awards ==
- Kickboxing
  - 2014 WLF World champion -80 kg
- Sanda
  - 2005 National Club League Sanda Championship (gold) -80 kg
  - 2006 Chinese Wushu Sanda Club Championship (gold) -80 kg
  - 2007 KFK Wushu International tournament Champion -80 kg
  - 2008 4th Wushu Sanda World Cup Champion -80 kg
  - 2009 Chinese Sports Medal of Honour

== Kickboxing Record ==
Professional kickboxing record
Date	Result	Opponent	Event	Location	Method	Round	Time
2015-08-15	Loss	(Russia) Surik Magakyan	Kunlun Fight 29	Sochi, Russia	Decision (Unanimous)	3	3:00
2015-07-19	Win	(Russia) Alexander Stetsurenko	Kunlun Fight 28	Nanjing, China	Decision (Unanimous)	3	3:00
2015-04-18	Win	(Belgium) Alka Matewa	CKF	Changde, China	Decision (Unanimous)	3	3:00
2015-04-12	Win	(Iran) Saeid Chahardouli	Kunlun Fight 22	Changde, China	Decision (Unanimous)	3	3:00
2015-02-01	Loss	(Ukraine) Artur Kyshenko	Kunlun Fight 18	Guangzhou, China	KO (Right Hook)	1	2:48
2014-08-24	Win	(South Korea) Kim Dea-hyeon	Kunlun Fight 13	Hohhot, China	KO	3	
2014-08-24	Win	(China) Nuerla Mulali	Kunlun Fight 8	Xining, China	KO (Left High Kick)	3	1:27
Wins the Wu Lin Feng World Championship -80 kg.
2008-11-24	Win	(China) Aotegen Bateer	2008 Chinese Wushu Sanda Kung Fu King Competition	Harbin, China	TKO	2	
2007-03-25	Win	(China) Fang Bian	2007 KFK Wushu International tournament	Chongqing, China	Decision (Unanimous)	3	3:00
Wins the Wu KFK Wushu International tournament -80 kg.
2007-03-23	Win	(Russia) Muslim Salikhov	2nd Kung Fu King Tournament (国际武术搏击争霸赛), Semi Finals	Chongqing, China	Decision (Unanimous)	3	3:00
Legend: Win Loss Draw/No contest Notes
