= Wu Xuesong =

Chinese Sanshou kickboxer (born 1993)

- Born: January 2, 1993 (age 33); Guangzhou, Guangdong, China
- Native name: 吴雪松
- Other names: Ganyue Snapdragon
- Nationality: Chinese
- Height: 1.75 m (5 ft 9 in)
- Weight: 70 kg (150 lb; 11 st)
- Division: Lightweight
- Style: Sanda, Kickboxing
- Stance: Orthodox
- Team: Guangzhou Dragon Flying Fighting Club
- Years active: 2012-present

Kickboxing record
- Total: 51
- Wins: 29
- By knockout: 8
- Losses: 22
- By knockout: 2
- Draws: 0
- Last updated on: July 5, 2018

Wu Xuesong (Chinese: 吴雪松; pinyin: wú xuě sōng) is a Chinese Sanda kickboxer. He is from Guangzhou Dragon Flying Fighting Club. As of September 2016, he is ranked the #6 lightweight in the world by LiverKick.

== Career ==
On January 17, 2015, in Kunlun Fight 17, Wu Continuous beat Pan, Liu and Zhao in a night, Win the 70 kg World Max Group D tournament bracket.

On March 8, 2015, in Kunlun Fight 20, Wu beat Nakano Takuya by TKO.

On 8 April 2016 in Haihu District Gym Center in Xining, Wu beat Alex Oller and Tayfun Ozcan, winning the 70 kg World Max 2016 Group G Tournament Final. In Kunlun Fight 50, Wu beat Sergio Kanters by decision.

== Championships and awards ==
- Kickboxing
- 2016 Kunlun Fight World Max Group G Tournament Winner
- 2015 Kunlun Fight World Max Group D Tournament Winner
- 2014 Chinese Sanshou championship champion -70 kg

== Kickboxing record ==
Professional kickboxing record
29 Wins (8 (T)KO's), 23 Losses
Date	Result	Opponent	Event	Location	Method	Round	Time
2023-09-14	Loss	(China) Meng Lingkuo	TOP Fighting Championship	China			
2020-07-05	Loss	(China) Song Shaoqiu	Wu Lin Feng 2020: King's Super Cup 3rd Group Stage	Zhengzhou, China	TKO (Knee)	1	3:00
2020-06-13	Loss	(China) Ouyang Feng	Wu Lin Feng 2020: King's Super Cup 2nd Group Stage	Zhengzhou, China	TKO	1	
2020-05-15	Loss	(China) Pu Dongdong	Wu Lin Feng 2020: King's Super Cup 1st Group Stage	Zhengzhou, China	Decision (Unanimous)	3	3:00
2019-03-24	Loss	(Greece) Nikos Gkikas	Wu Lin Feng 2019: WLF x Gods of War XII - China vs Greece	Athens, Greece	Decision (Unanimous)	3	3:00
2018-12-26	Loss	(China) Meng Qinghao	King Of Kungfu Champion Fight	China	Decision (Unanimous)	3	3:00
2018-12-15	Win	(Thailand) Boonyok Anuchit	King Of Kungfu Champion Fight	China	Decision (Unanimous)	3	3:00
2018-07-28	Loss	(Greece) Giannis Skordilis	FF	Shenzhen, China	KO (Left High Kick)	2	
2018-04-15	Loss	(Japan) Nishikawa Tomoyuki	Kunlun Fight 72	Beijing, China	Ex.R Decision (Unanimous)	4	3:00
2017-11-12	Loss	(Australia) Victor Nagbe	Kunlun Fight 67	China	KO (Left Body Cross)	2	1:38
2017-08-23	Loss	(Thailand) Pord Kachoenram	The World Boxing Championship of Wang zhe hui meng	Lv liang, China	Decision (Unanimous)	3	3:00
2017-06-24	Win	(Russia) Mass	Yunfeng Duel	Laizhou, China	TKO (Referee Stoppage)	2	
2017-06-10	Loss	(Czech Republic) Martin Gano	Kunlun Fight 62	Bangkok, Thailand	Decision (Unanimous)	3	3:00
2017-04-28	Win	(Brazil) Diego Ben Dizzie	Zhanlang Duel	Hunan, China	Decision (Unanimous)	3	3:00
2017-03-25	Loss	(Serbia) Nikola Cimesa	Kunlun Fight 59 -70 kg World Max 2017 Group 4 Tournament Final	China	Decision (Unanimous)	3	3:00
2017-03-25	Win	(Mexico) Jose Ruelas	Kunlun Fight 59 -70 kg World Max 2017 Group 4 Tournament Semi-Finals	China	KO (Left Hook)	2	1:34
2017-01-01	Loss	(Belarus) Andrei Kulebin	Kunlun Fight 56	Sanya, China	Decision (Unanimous)	3	3:00
2016-10-30	Loss	(Suriname) Cedric Manhoef	Kunlun Fight 54 -70 kg 2016 Tournament Quarter-Finals	Hubei, China	Decision (Unanimous)	3	3:00
2016-08-20	Win	(Suriname) Sergio Kanters	Kunlun Fight 50 -70 kg 2016 Tournament 1/8 Finals	Jinan, China	Decision (Unanimous)	3	3:00
Qualified to Kunlun Fight 2016 70kg World MAX Tournament Final 8.
2016-06-05	Win	(Ukraine) Levgenii Schevchenko	Kunlun Fight 45	Jinan, China	Ext.R Decision (Unanimous)	4	3:00
2016-05-13	Win	(Thailand) Wen Sor. Pettawee	United Fighting Union	Shenzhen, China	KO	1	1:35
2016-04-26	Loss	(Belarus) Farkhad Akhmejanov	2016 Hanzhong King Championship	Hanzhong, China	Ext.R Decision (unanimous)	4	3:00
2016-04-08	Win	(Turkey) Tayfun Özcan	Kunlun Fight 41 -70 kg World Max 2016 Group G Tournament Final	Xining, China	KO (Left Hook)	2	0:26
Qualified to Kunlun Fight 2016 70kg World MAX Tournament Final 16.
2016-04-08	Win	(Brazil) Alexsander Silva	Kunlun Fight 41 -70 kg World Max 2016 Group G Tournament Semi-Finals	Xining, China	TKO (Referee Stoppage)	2	0:55
2016-03-12	Loss	(Iran) Masoud Minaei	The Legend of Emei - 6	Xichang, China	Decision (Unanimous)	3	3:00
2015-10-31	Loss	(China) Kong Lingfeng	Kunlun Fight 33 -Middleweight Tournament 1/8 Finals	Changde, China	Decision (Unanimous)	3	3:00
2015-09-04	Win	(Ukraine) Konstantinov Dmytro	Kunlun Fight 30 / Topking World Series: TK5	Zhoukou, China	Decision (Unanimous)	3	3:00
2015-05-15	Loss	(Russia) Vlad Tuinov	Kunlun Fight 25	Banská Bystrica, Slovakia	Decision (Unanimous)	3	3:00
2015-03-08	Win	(Japan) Nakano Takuya	Kunlun Fight 20	Foshan, China	TKO (Referee Stoppage)	2	
2015-01-17	Win	(China) Zhao Yan	Kunlun Fight 17 -Middleweight Tournament Group D Final	Nanjing, China	Decision (Unanimous)	3	3:00
Qualified to Kunlun Fight 2015 70kg World MAX Tournament Final.
2015-01-17	Win	(China) Liu Mingzhi	Kunlun Fight 17 -Middleweight Tournament Group D Semi-finals	Nanjing, China	Decision (Unanimous)	3	3:00
2015-01-17	Win	(Taiwan) Pan Hongmin	Kunlun Fight 17 -Middleweight Tournament Group D Quarter-finals	Nanjing, China	TKO (Referee Stoppage)	1	
2014-09-26	Loss	(United States) Arthur Sorsor	WBK 1 - Ningbo	Ningbo, China	Decision (Unanimous)	3	3:00
2014-06-01	Win	(Belarus) Dzmitry Nason	Kunlun Fight 5	Chengdu, China	Decision (Unanimous)	3	3:00
2013-08-24	Loss	(China) Hu Yafei	Wu Lin Feng Championship 2013 – 70 kg Tournament, Semi Finals	Huaibei, China	Decision (Unanimous)	3	3:00
Legend: Win Loss Draw/No contest Notes
