= Jonay Risco =

Spanish kickboxer

Jonay Risco Perez
- Born: April 25, 1987 (age 39); Tenerife, Spain
- Nationality: (Spain) Spanish
- Height: 1.77 m (5 ft 9 1/2 in)
- Weight: 70 kg (150 lb; 11 st)
- Division: Lightweight
- Style: Kickboxing
- Stance: Orthodox
- Fighting out of: Tenerife, Spain
- Team: Team Moi Rui
- Trainer: Moises Ruibal
- Years active: 2009-present

Kickboxing record
- Total: 77
- Wins: 60
- Losses: 16
- Draws: 1

Jonay Risco (born 25 May 1987 in Spain) is a Spanish kickboxer currently signed with ONE Championship.

He was ranked as a top ten lightweight by Combat Press between June 2018 and July 2021.

== Kickboxing career ==
=== Early career ===
Risco fought Andy Souwer during Enfusion 27, and won the fight by close decision after an extra round was fought.

In September 2015, Risco fought the kickboxing legend Sitthichai Sitsongpeenong. He lost by unanimous decision.

=== Enfusion title reign ===
Zuev and Risco fought a rematch four months later, during Enfusion 40, for the Enfusion 70 kg title. Risco won the rematch by unanimous decision.

He was scheduled to fight the future two weight Enfusion champion Tayfun Ozcan during Enfusion 46. Risco won by TKO, as Tayfun suffered a cut on his shin.

Risco had his first title defense during Enfusion 63, when he was scheduled to fight Buakaw Banchamek. Risco won the fight by decision. He fought Davit Kiria in a non-title bout during Enfusion 66, and won by unanimous decision.

Risco fought in the first round of the Kunlun Fight 70 kg tournament during KLF 75, when he won a unanimous decision against Li Shiyuan. He then defended his Enfusion title for the second time with a decision win over Nordin Ben Moh. Advancing to the KLF tournament quarterfinals, Risco faced Feng Xingli. Xingli won the fight by unanimous decision.

Following this loss, Risco went on a 14-month hiatus from the sport, as he recovered from muscle and ligament injuries in his left leg. Before suffering these injuries, Risco was scheduled to defend his title against Superbon Banchamek.

Risco was scheduled to defend his Enfusion title for the third time in a rematch with Tayfun Ozcan. Ozcan won the fight by unanimous decision.

=== ONE Championship ===
In May 2020, Risco signed with ONE Championship.

== Titles ==
- 2016 Enfusion -70 kg Champion
  - Two title defenses
- 2013 WFCA World -72,5 kg Champion

== Kickboxing record ==
Professional Kickboxing Record
60 Wins, 16 Losses, 1 Draw, 0 No Contest
Date	Result	Opponent	Event	Location	Method	Round	Time
2019-12-06	Loss	(Turkey) Tayfun Özcan	Enfusion 92	Abu Dhabi, United Arab Emirates	Decision (Unanimous)	5	3:00
Lost the Enfusion -70kg title.
2018-10-14	Loss	(China) Feng Xingli	Kunlun Fight 77	China	Decision (Unanimous)	3	3:00
2018-09-15	Win	(Morocco) Nordin Ben Moh	Enfusion 70	Belgium	Decision (Unanimous)	3	3:00
Defends the Enfusion Live World -70 kg title.
2018-08-05	Win	(China) Li Shiyuan	Kunlun Fight 75	Sanya, China	Decision (Unanimous)	3	3:00
2018-05-05	Win	(Georgia (country)) Davit Kiria	Enfusion Live 66	Tenerife, Spain	Decision (Unanimous)	5	3:00
57-14-1 prior to this fight.
2018-03-05	Win	(Thailand) Buakaw Banchamek	Enfusion 63	Abu Dhabi	Decision	5	3:00
Defends the Enfusion Live World -70 kg title.
2017-09-01	Win	(Australia) Zion Edwards	Spain v Australia	Spain	Decision (Unanimous)	3	3:00
2017-05-20	Loss	(Netherlands) Redouan Laarkoubi	Strikers League	Tenerife, Spain	TKO (doctor stoppage)		
2017-04-29	Loss	(Belgium) Yassin Baitar	Enfusion Live #49	Netherlands	Decision	3	3:00
2017-03-11	Loss	(Georgia (country)) Davit Kiria	Kunlun Fight 58 70 kg Qualifier Tournament 3 Semi-Final B	Rome, Italy	Decision (unanimous)	3	3:00
2017-02-18	Win	(Turkey) Tayfun Özcan	Enfusion Live 46	Eindhoven, Netherlands	TKO (Shin Injury)	2	1:21
2016-11-20	Loss	(Morocco) Mohammed Jaraya	Enfusion Live 43	Netherlands	Decision	3	3:00
2016-09-17	Loss	(France) Crice Boussoukou	Enfusion Live 41	Netherlands	Decision (extra round)	4	3:00
2016-06-04	Loss	(Belarus) Dzianis Zuev	Enfusion Live 40	Gran Canaria, Spain	Decision (Unanimous)	3	3:00
Wins the Enfusion Live World -70 kg title.
2016-04-16	Win	(South Africa) Warren Stevelmans	CAMPEONATO DE CANARIAS	Spain	Decision (Unanimous)	3	3:00
2016-02-21	Loss	(Belarus) Dzianis Zuev	Kunlun Fight 38 70 kg World Max 2016 Group A Tournament Semi-Finals	Pattaya, Thailand	Decision (Unanimous)	3	3:00
2016-01-23	Loss	(Russia) Anatoly Moiseev	Kunlun Fight 37	Sanya, China	Decision (Unanimous)	3	3:00
2015-12-12	Win	(Netherlands) William Diender	Shoot Boxing	Spain	Decision (Unanimous)	3	3:00
2015-11-07	Win	(Switzerland) Christophe Pruvost	Enfusion Live 33	Switzerland	Decision	3	3:00
2015-09-28	Loss	(Thailand) Sitthichai Sitsongpeenong	Kunlun Fight 31 – World MAX Tournament 2015 Final 16	Bangkok, Thailand	Decision (unanimous)	3	3:00
2015-07-19	Win	(China) Zhao Shuai	Kunlun Fight 28	Nanjing, China	KO	2	
2015-07-19	Win	(Russia) Maksym Smirnov	Kunlun Fight 28	Nanjing, China	Decision (Unanimous)	3	3:00
2015-04-18	Win	(Netherlands) Andy Souwer	Enfusion Live 27	Tenerife, Spain	Decision (Extra Round)	4	
2015-02-28	Loss	(Spain) Sergio Sanchez	Top Fight Madrid	Spain	Decision	3	3:00
2014-12-13	Win	(Spain) Christopher Mena	GMM Fight Night	Spain	KO		
2014-05-10	Win	(Portugal) Dan Balesmao	El Desafio	Spain	KO	3	3:00
2013-07-13	Win	(Portugal) Arnaldo Silva	Enfusion Live	Tenerife, Spain	Decision	5	3:00
Wins the WFCA World -72,5kg title.
2013-04-13	Win	(Spain) Elam Ngor	Noche K1	Tenerife, Spain	Decision	3	3:00
2012-07-21	Win	(Spain) Rafa Del Toro	It's Showtime 59	Spain	Decision	3	3:00
2012-05-27	Loss	(Spain) David Calvo	K-1 Rising 2012	Madrid, Spain	Decision	3	3:00
2012-05-05	Loss	(Spain) Antonio Gomez Cortes	Lucha de Titanes III	Madrid, Spain	Decision	3	3:00
2011-11-12	Loss	(Suriname) Andy Ristie	Street Culture, Fight Club Group & Canary Kickboxing Federation presents: It's Showtime 53	Tenerife, Spain	TKO (left hook)	3	2:30
2011-06-18	Loss	(Thailand) Naruepol Fairtex	China Fight Night	China	Decision	3	3:00
2011-03-03	Win	(Spain) Sergio Suarez	SKB: Spanish Warriors	Spain	Decision (Unanimous)	3	3:00
2011-01-08	Loss	(South Africa) Warren Stevelmans	K-1 MAX Madrid 2011, Quarter Finals	Madrid, Spain	Decision	3	3:00
Legend: Win Loss Draw/No contest Notes

== See also ==
- List of It's Showtime events
- List of male kickboxers
