= Shenzhen Bay Gymnasium =

Sports venue in Shenzhen, China

- Interactive map of Shenzhen Bay Gymnasium
- Location: Nanshan, Shenzhen, Guangdong, China
- Coordinates: 22°31′14.9″N 113°56′38.2″E
- Owner: Shenzhen Municipal People's Government
- Operator: Culture, Media, Tourism and Sports Bureau of Shenzhen Municipality
- Capacity: 12,793

Construction
- Opened: 2011

Tenant
- 2011 Summer Universiade

Shenzhen Bay Gymnasium is an indoor arena located in Nanshan District, Shenzhen, China. Part of the Shenzhen Bay Sports Center, it was built for the 2011 Summer Universiade. It hosts the basketball and gymnastics events. The capacity of the arena is 12,793 spectators and it opened in August 2011.

== See also ==
- List of indoor arenas in China
