= Alka Matewa =

Belgian Actor former Muay Thai/Kick boxing World Champion and MMA fighter

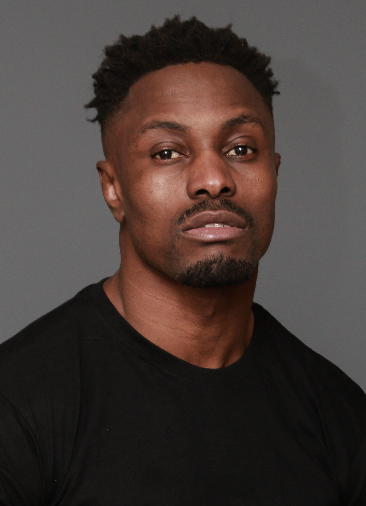
- Born: Alka Matewa; 26 April 1987 (age 39); Kinshasa, Zaire
- Nationality: Belgian
- Height: 5 ft 10 in (1.78 m)
- Weight: 185 lb (84 kg; 13 st 3 lb)
- Division: Lightweight
- Style: Kickboxing, Muay Thai
- Stance: Orthodox
- Fighting out of: Brussels, Belgium
- Team: Wolf Gang
- Trainer: Komsan Thailand / Abdel Amadachou Belgium
- Years active: 2003–present (started with Muay Thai)

Kickboxing record
- Total: 135
- Wins: 112
- Losses: 22
- By knockout: 0
- Draws: 1

Mixed martial arts record
- Total: 7
- Wins: 4
- By knockout: 4
- Losses: 3
- By knockout: 2
- By submission: 1

Other information
- Occupation: Actor, fighter
- University: Le 75
- Notable club: Wolf Gang
- Boxing record from BoxRec
- Mixed martial arts record from Sherdog
- Last updated on: 28 June 2013

Alka Matewa (born 26 April 1987) is a Congolese–Belgian actor, former Muay Thai kickboxer and mixed martial artist.

== Early life ==
Alka Matewa was born on 26 April 1987 in Kinshasa, Congo, the son of Pierre Maytewa and Lucie Nsuele. Both parents are Congolese. Alka's background can be specifically traced back to the Ba KONGO people.

Alka is born in congo but spent some of his early years in France ( Monthlerry 91 ) and in Germany ( Köln ) The Family finally moved to Brussels, Belgium in 1998. They arrive in a neighborhood named Ixelles (1050).

== Filmographie ==
=== Television ===
Year	Title	Platform	Role
2021	Braqueurs	Netflix	Arnaud
2025	Mademoiselle Holmes	TF1	Alka

=== Films ===
Year	Title	Role
2022	Underdogs	Ezat

== Mixed martial arts career ==
Matewa made his mixed martial arts debut on 28 August 2010 defeating T.J Coletti by TKO in the first round.

=== Bellator ===
Matewa then signed with Bellator and made his debut for the promotion at Bellator 47 against fellow muay thai striker Alex Ricci.

He lost to Duochonlek by decision at Max Muay Thai 2 in Pattaya, Thailand on 29 June 2013.

== Mixed martial arts record ==
Professional record breakdown
6 matches	4 wins	2 losses
By knockout	4	1
By submission	0	1
By decision	0	0
Draws	0	
No contests	0	

Res.	Record	Opponent	Method	Event	Date	Round	Time	Location	Notes
Win	4–2	Alix JeanGuillame	TKO	EBD 5	2 February 2019	1	4:37	La Louvière, Belgium	
Win	3–2	Makeshati	KO (kick liver)	WBK 6	13 September 2015	1	4:18	Shanghai, China	
Win	2–2	Oleg Kosinov	KO (Head Kick)	SOMMAF – Steel Battle 1	16 July 2014	2	3:58	Stary Oskol, Russia	
Loss	1–2	Alex Ricci	TKO (elbows and punches)	Bellator 47	23 July 2011	2	2:40	Rama, Ontario, Canada	
Loss	1–1	Jesse Ronson	Submission (armbar)	Wreck MMA – Strong and Proud	28 January 2011	1	4:51	Gatineau, Quebec, Canada	
Win	1–0	T.J. Coletti	TKO (punches)	XCC – Battle at the Border 10	28 August 2010	1	0:40	Algonac, Michigan, United States	

== Muay Thai and Kickboxing record ==
- 2018 Phoenix Muay Thai World champion – 80,00 kg
- 2013 WCFS World K-1 rules champion – 80,00 kg
- 2012 WCFS European muay thai champion −76,00 kg
- 2012 WKN Full Muay Thai Rules Intercontinental Champion −72,6 kg
- 2006 BKBMO Belgium Champion
- Benelux Champion BKBMO
- European Champion WCFSC

Muay Thai & Kickboxing record
112 Wins (31 (T)KO's), 22 Losses, 1 Draws
Date	Result	Opponent	Event	Location	Method	Round	Time
2018-10-13	Win	(Morocco) Redouane El Chapo	PSM Fight Night	Brussels, Belgium	no contest	1	2:32
2019-05-18	Win	(Netherlands) Evret Manga	Warrior's Fight Night	Leuven, Belgium	Disqualification	1	2:40
2018-10-13	Win	(France) Jonathan Lecat	Phoenix 10 World Title	Brussels, Belgium	KO	2	2:12
2016-06-05	Loss	(Russia) Alexander Stetsurenko	ACB KB 6: Battle in Brussels	Brussels, Belgium	Decision	3	3:00
2015-10-24	Loss	(France) Yohan Lidon	La Nuit des Challenges 14	Saint-Fons, France	Decision	5	3:00
For the I.S.K.A. K1 Rules World −76.8 kg Title.
2015-08-22	Loss	(Thailand) Tengnueng Sitjaesairoong	Thai Fight	Thailand	Decision	3	3:00
2015-08-01	Loss	(China) Baosheriguleng	CFC Kungfu	Tongliao, China	Decision	3	3:00
2015-07-24	Loss	(China) Fu Gaofeng	Shandong haohan	Linyi, China	Decision	3	3:00
2015-05-24	Loss	(China) Fu Gaofeng	Legend of Winners	Ningxia, China	Decision	3	3:00
2015-05-24	Win	(China) Wang Lixiang	Legend of Winners	Ningxia, China	TKO	1	0:52
2015-05-09	Loss	(Brazil) Jackson Souza	Muaythai Fury	Phuket, Thailand	Decision	3	3:00
2015-04-18	Loss	(China) Bai Jinbin	CKF	Beijing, China	Decision	3	3:00
2015-01-31	Win	(Thailand) Duangsompong Kor Tapaotong	Muaythai Fury	Phuket, Thailand	KO (Hook)	3	
2014-11-22	Loss	(Thailand) Saiyok Pumpanmuang	2014 Thai Fight – 72.5 kg Tournament 1/2 Finals	Thailand	KO (Elbows)	1	
2014-10-25	Win	(England) Ben Hodge	2014 Thai Fight −72,5 kg/160 lb Tournament, Quarter Finals	Bangkok, Thailand	Decision	3	3:00
2014-09-20	Loss	(Thailand) Sudsakorn Sor Klinmee	Thai Fight Vietnam	Vietnam	Decision	3	3:00
2014-06-28	Loss	(Thailand) Saiyok Pumpanmuang	Thai Fight Macao	Macau, China	Decision	3	3:00
2014-06-05	Win	(France) Yacouba Cisse	Mionnay	France	Decision	3	3:00
2014-05-24	Loss	(France) Johane Beausejour	Elite Fight Night, Semi-finals	Germany	Decision	3	3:00
2014-05-11	Win	(France) Samuel Andoche	Le Défi du Nack Muay 5	France	TKO (doctor stoppage)	1	
2014-01-04	Loss	(Thailand) Kongchak	Suk Singpatong + Sit Numnoi	Phuket, Thailand	Decision	3	3:00
2013-06-29	Loss	(Thailand) Dernchonlek Sor.Sor.Niyom	MAX Muay Thai 2	Pattaya, Thailand	Decision	3	3:00
2013-06-06	Loss	(China) Fang Bian	Wu Lin Feng	Dubai, United Arab Emirates	Decision	3	3:00
2013-05-12	Win	(Belgium) Walid Attadlaoui		Brussels, Belgium	TKO	5	
Wins WCFS World Muay Thai Championship −79,00 kg.
2013-05-04	Win	(Belgium) Cédric de Keirsmaeker	Ultimate Takedown 5	Brussels, Belgium	TKO		
2013-03-03	Win	(France) Abderahim Chafay	Ikuza 2	Brussels, Belgium	TKO	4	3:00
2013-03-03	Win	(Netherlands) Mohamed Abdelaim	Ikuza 1	Brussels, Belgium	TKO	4	3:00
Wins WCFS European Muay Thai Championship −76,00 kg
2012-11-03	Win	(Italy) Marco Re	Glory 3: Rome – 70 kg Slam Tournament	Rome, Italy	Decision (Unanimous)	3	3:00
2012-08-24	Loss	(Ukraine) Alim Nabiev	W5 Fighter Moscow XIII	Moscow, Russia	Decision	3	3:00
2012-06-23	Win	(Turkey) Erkan Varol	WKN Turkey	Kahramanmaraş, Turkey	Decision (Unanimous)	5	3:00
For WKN Full Muay Thai Rules Intercontinental Championship −72,6 kg
2012-05-27	Win	(Netherlands) Matthias Ibssa	'Slamm!! IV	Amsterdam, the Netherlands	Decision (Unanimous)	3	3:00
2012-03-04	Loss	(Turkey) Tayfun Ozcan	Force & Honneur	Brussels, Belgium	Decision	3	3:00
2012-02-04	Win	(Belgium) Sonny Dagraed	Battle Arena	Zwevegem, Belgium	TKO	3	3:00
Legend: Win Loss Draw/No contest Notes
