= Luoyang Stadium =

Sports venue in Luoyang, China

- Interactive map of Luoyang Stadium
- Full name: Luoyang Sports Centre Stadium
- Location: Louyang, China
- Coordinates: 34.6211°N 112.4235°E
- Capacity: 39,888

Construction
- Opened: 2008

Tenant
- Henan Huishang F.F.C.

The Luoyang Sports Centre Stadium is a multi-purpose stadium in Luoyang, China. It is currently used mostly for football matches. The stadium holds 39,888 spectators. It opened in 2008.
