= Jamie Bates =

English kickboxer (born 1989)

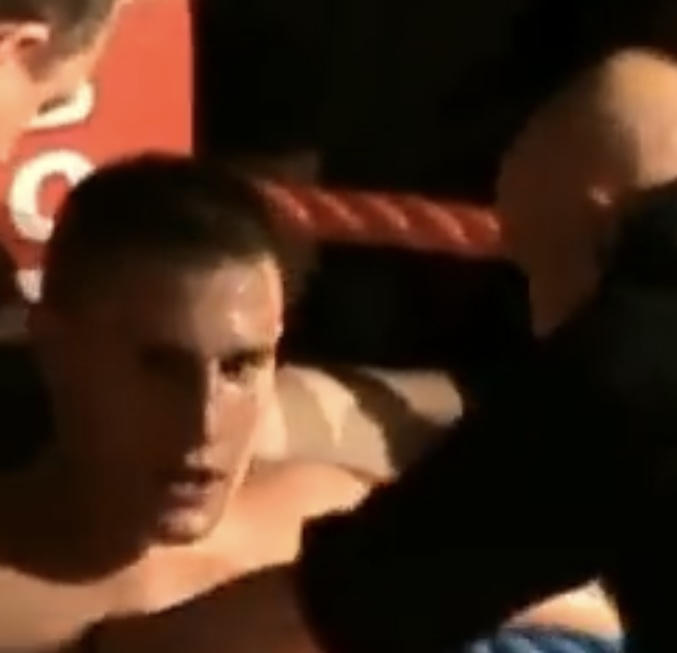
- Bates in 2011
- Born: 14 September 1989 (age 37); Durham, England
- Nationality: England
- Height: 1.85 m (6 ft 1 in)
- Weight: 77 kg (170 lb; 12.1 st)
- Division: Welterweight
- Style: Kickboxing
- Stance: Orthodox
- Fighting out of: Annfield Plain, England
- Team: MASAC Gym
- Years active: 2008 - present

Kickboxing record
- Total: 38
- Wins: 27
- By knockout: 3
- Losses: 9
- By knockout: 5
- Draws: 1
- No contests: 1

Other information
- Boxing record from BoxRec
- Last updated on: 29 February 2020

Jamie Bates (born 14 September 1989) is an English Glory kickboxer fighting out of Annfield Plain, County Durham, England. He was ranked #5 in the world from 2020 to 2023 by Combat Press.

== Kickboxing career ==
=== Early career ===
Jamie Bates grew up on the mats in his father's gym in region of Durham. Starting with karate at age 4, with his father as instructor, Bates eventually progressed to kickboxing. He won a professional world title when he was 22.

=== Superkombat Fighting Championship ===
Selected from the Superkombat World Tryouts from Middlesbrough, England, Bates had signed a multi-fight deal with the SUPERKOMBAT in 2014. On 24 May 2014, he was a participant in the Superkombat World Grand Prix series. Bates faced Flavius Boiciuc of Romania in the opening semifinals at Superkombat World Grand Prix II 2014 held in Mamaia, Romania and won via unanimous decision. Coming as outsider, he later faced Miles Simson in the finals, pulling off upset with another unanimous decision over the Surinamese.

In October, he lost a title eliminator to Yoann Kongolo at Superkombat World Grand Prix 2014 Final Elimination in Geneva, Switzerland. After dominating the fight, Bates eventually lost via a third round KO. After losing to Kongolo, Bates would go on a run, defeating notable fighters Pavel Turuk and Kev Ward, but losing to Ciprian Șchiopu and Alim Nabiev.

=== Glory ===
Bates signed with a two-fight contract with Glory in 2017. He made his promotional debut at Glory 40: Copenhagen against Richard Abraham. Bates won the fight by unanimous decision. Bates was next scheduled to fight Eyevan Danenberg at Glory 49: Rotterdam. Danenberg won the fight by unanimous decision.

Bates bounced back from this loss with decision wins over Tommy King at Glory 54 and Vedat Hödük at Glory 70. On 29 February 2020, he made his fifth appearance inside the Glory ring when he took on the #2 ranked welterweight and former champion, Harut Grigorian, at Glory 75: Utrecht. Jamies Bates defeated Grigorian via unanimous decision. In 2023 he lost to Jay Overmeer.

== Achievements ==
- 2014 Superkombat World Grand Prix II Light Heavyweight Tournament Championship
- 2011 WKF Full Contact Light Cruiserweight Champion

== Kickboxing record ==
Kickboxing record
27 wins (3 (T)KOs), 9 losses, 1 draw, 1 no contest
Date	Result	Opponent	Event	Location	Method	Round	Time
2027-03-27		(Cameroon) Brice Kombou	World Fighting League UK	Sunderland, United Kingdom			
For the World Fighting League -75kg title.
2026-09-19	Loss	(Netherlands) Nouri De Jager	World Fighting League	Utrecht, Netherlands	TKO (knee)		
2026-04-19	Loss	(Democratic Republic of the Congo) Christian Baya	K-1 World MAX 2026 in Utrecht - World Fighting League	Utrecht, Netherlands	Decision (unanimous)	5	3:00
For the inaugural World Fighting League -75kg title.
2024-06-29	Draw	(Italy) Mustapha Haida	Oktagon Tsunami Edition	Rome, Italy	Decision	3	3:00
2023-03-11	Loss	(Netherlands) Jay Overmeer	Glory 84	Rotterdam, Netherlands	TKO (three knockdowns)	2	2:42
2022-12-10	Win	(Sweden) Joakim Hagg	Victory 10	Newcastle upon Tyne, England	Decision (unanimous)	3	3:00
2022-02-12	NC	(Romania) Anghel Cardoş	Fight Fest Champions 16	Newcastle, England	No contest	3	2:00
For the FFC Welterweight International Title.
2020-02-29	Win	(Armenia) Harut Grigorian	Glory 75: Utrecht	Utrecht, Netherlands	Decision (unanimous)	3	3:00
2019-10-26	Win	(Turkey) Vedat Hödük	Glory 70: Lyon	Lyon, France	Decision (unanimous)	3	3:00
2018-06-02	Win	(England) Tommy King	Glory 54: Birmingham	Birmingham, England	Decision (unanimous)	3	3:00
2017-12-09	Loss	(Netherlands) Eyevan Danenberg	Glory 49: Rotterdam	Rotterdam, Netherlands	Decision (unanimous)	3	3:00
2017-04-29	Win	(United States) Richard Abraham	Glory 40: Copenhagen	Copenhagen, Denmark	Decision (unanimous)	3	3:00
2017-03-11	Win	(England) Kev Ward	Road to Glory UK	Grantham, England	Decision (unanimous)	3	2:00
2016-07-02	Loss	(Romania) Ciprian Șchiopu	Respect World Series 2	London, England	TKO (retirement)	2	3:00
2016-02-27	Loss	(Azerbaijan) Alim Nabiev	ACB KB 5	Orel, Russia	Decision (unanimous)	3	3:00
2015-10-16	Win	(Belarus) Pavel Turuk	ACB KB 3: Grand Prix Final	Sibiu, Romania	Decision (unanimous)	3	3:00
2015-05-29	Loss	(Belarus) Pavel Turuk	Tatneft Cup	Kazan, Russia	Ext.R decision (unanimous)	4	3:00
2014-10-25	Loss	(Switzerland) Yoann Kongolo	Superkombat World Grand Prix 2014 Final Elimination	Geneva, Switzerland	KO (spinning back fist + flying knee)	3	2:23
SUPERKOMBAT Light Heavyweight Championship Eliminator
2014-05-24	Win	(Netherlands) Miles Simson	Superkombat World Grand Prix II 2014, Final	Constanța, Romania	Decision (unanimous)	3	3:00
Wins the Superkombat World Grand Prix II 2014 Tournament Championship.
2014-05-24	Win	(Romania) Flavius Boiciuc	Superkombat World Grand Prix II 2014, Semi Finals	Constanța, Romania	Decision (unanimous)	3	3:00
2014-04-13	Win	(United Kingdom) Karl Langley	DUEL Fight Sports	United Kingdom	KO	5	
2013-11-02	Win	(United Kingdom) Christian Di Paolo	The Main Event 2013	Manchester, England	TKO (injury)	3	
2011-11-19	Win	(United Kingdom) Marlon Hunt	Duel Fight Sports	Newcastle, England	Decision (unanimous)	12	2:00
Wins the WKF Full Contact Light Cruiserweight Championship.
2010-10-16	Loss	(United Kingdom) Andrew Tate	History IN The Making 4 - Undisputed!	Newark-on-Trent, United Kingdom	KO (head kick)	8	
2009-06-13	Win	(Greece) Eletherios Chachmidis	Final Elimination, Tournament Final	Stanley, United Kingdom	Decision (split)	5	2:00
Wins the Final Elimination 8-man Tournament.
2009-06-13	Win	(France) Allan Blondeau	Final Elimination, Tournament Semi Final	Stanley, United Kingdom	Decision	5	2:00
2009-06-13	Win	(Latvia) Reinis Porosozs	Final Elimination, Tournament Quarter Final	Stanley, United Kingdom	Decision	5	2:00
2009-03-21	Win	(United Kingdom) Michael Elmsly		United Kingdom	Decision		
Legend: Win Loss Draw/no contest Notes

== Boxing record ==
1 fight	1 win	0 losses
By decision	1	0

Key to abbreviations used for results
DQ	Disqualification	RTD	Corner retirement
KO	Knockout	SD	Split decision / split draw
MD	Majority decision / majority draw	TD	Technical decision / technical draw
NC	No contest	TKO	Technical knockout
PTS	Points decision	UD	Unanimous decision / unanimous draw

Boxing record
No.	Result	Record	Opponent	Type	Round(s), time	Date	Location	Notes
1	Win	1-0	(United Kingdom) Yailton Neves	Points	(4) 3:00	2019-07-06	England	Light Hheavyweight bout
