= Artem Pashporin =

Thai kickboxer

- Born: 26 January 1993 (age 33); Bogorodsk, Nizhny Novgorod, Russia
- Other names: Spur
- Nationality: Rus
- Height: 1.82 m (5 ft 11 1/2 in)
- Weight: 71 kg (157 lb; 11.2 st)
- Division: Lightweight
- Style: Muay Thai
- Fighting out of: Nizhny Novgorod, Russia
- Team: Puncher-NN Gym (2005–present)
- Trainer: Maxim Vinogradov
- Years active: 2005–present

Kickboxing record
- Total: 48
- Wins: 34
- By knockout: 5
- Losses: 13
- Draws: 1

Artem Pashporin (born 26 January 1993, Bogorodsk, Russia) is a Russian professional welterweight Muay Thai fighter and kickboxer. World Champion W5 (2015), Two times world champion GPRO (2016, 2022), intercontinental WKU Champion (2018), World Champion S-1 (2018), European WMC Champion (2018) and four-time KWU Champion (2021).

== Biography and career ==
Pashporin was born in Bogorodsk near Nizhny Novgorod and soon moved with his parents to Nizhny Novgorod. He wanted to practice martial arts, in particular judo, since childhood to follow his father's steps, but due to absence of a judo coach in the city, he turned to karate at the age of 11. He was trained by Maxim Vinogradov who participated in Muay Thai competitions.

During one of the fights, Pashporin seriously cut his opponent's head, earning him the nickname Russian: Шпора in consonance with his last name and chose an image of a cowboy for his professional ring appearances. In parallel with sports, he studied at Nizhny Novgorod State Technical University named Alekseev.

In 2015, Pashporin won the Russian Muay Thai Cup in categories up to 71 kg. In the summer of 2015, Artem went to the bout against Muay Thai legend Buakaw Banchamek, who won by decision after three rounds. At the end of the year in Vienna in fights with Cosmo Alexandre (Brazil) and Chris Ngimbi (Congo) Artem won the W5 world title. In 2016, he became GPRO world champion, in the third round, he forced Itay Gershon (Israel) to refuse to continue the fight. In 2017 he have lost the title of W5 world champion in the fight with kickboxing legend Giorgio Petrosyan, losing to him on points in a five-round bout.

In 2018, Pashporin started with a knockout win in the second round over Magnus Andersson (Sweden) at the Battle of Champions-10 tournament, where he represented Russia in the muay thai block. In the next fight, Artem was to fight with Enriko Kehl (Germany) at the ACB KB – 15 tournament, but the fight did not take place for reasons unknown to both sides. Until the end of this year, Artem was able to win three more belts. Intercontinental champion WKU, World champion S-1, European WMC champion. 2018 was the most fruitful in Artem's career. During the year he scored 5 wins in 5 fights and won 4 belts.

Pashporin started 2019 with a rematch with the Muay Thai and kickboxing living legend Buakaw Banchamek, in which he lost on points. The fight was the main event of the All Star Fight tournament, which was held on March 9 in Bangkok (Thailand) under the open sky at the stadium of the second cavalry division of the King's guard. The next fight Pashporin spent the same with a fighter of the club Banchamek. On the eighth of July at the arena of the RCC Academy in Yekaterinburg in the framework of the Fair Fight IX tournament, Artem Pashporin managed to win by the results of three rounds over Yodwicha Banchamek by a unanimous decision of the judges, however, later the organizers of the tournament decided to cancel the result of this fight because of public criticism. On September 14, Artem returned to the Kunlun Fight tournament to compete for the title of Intercontinental champion in the four-man tournament. In the first fight, the Russian won over Song Shaoqiu from China, and in the final lost by a split decision to the representative of Belarus Dzianis Zuev. Artem planned to finish 2019 at the Battle of Champions 11 tournament, where in the main fight he had to fight for the title of Intercontinental champion according to WMC, against Masoud Minaeyu from Iran, but an arm injury received in the first fight of the tournament-four KLF did not allow Artem to enter the fight. Instead, two-time Thai boxing world champion in Magomed Zainukov came to the fight and won the title of Intercontinental champion according to WMC.

2020 has become a difficult year for all professional athletes, martial artists are no exception. The first and main surprise of 2020 was the pandemic due to COVID-19, due to which Artem in Kunlun Fight could not provide the number of fight prescribed in the contract. In many other international organizations, there were cancellations and transfers of tournaments, at which preliminary agreements were reached on the fights for the Russian Spur. In this situation, Artyom's team, on a short notice, agrees to fight in the Fair Fight organization. The invitation to the tournament came literally a few days before the tournament, but Artem agrees, because he understands that in a pandemic, this may be the only proposal in this year. In the fight at Fair Fight, Pashporin is inferior by knockout in the second round, although until this moment he is leading the fight on points. After this defeat, Artem continues to keep train. In August, he received an invitation from Senshi to go to the international Kyokushin World Union training camp along with kickboxing legends Peter Aerts, Semmy Schilt and Ernesto Hoost. Artem received an offer to take part in a professional fight in Bulgaria in December against Dmitry Glevki from Portugal. However, later due to the pandemic, the event was postponed to February 2021. Then Artem decided to take part in the amateur muaythai Cup of Russia, in which he had 4 fights and in all of them he won in empathic fashion.

== Titles ==
- 2022 KWU champion weight category up to 70 kg
- 2022 World Gpro Champion in the weight category up to 71 kg
- 2021 Four-time KWU champion weight category up to 70 kg
- 2020 Winner of the muay thai Russian Cup in the weight category up to 71 kg
- 2018 European WMC Champion in the weight category up to 69.9 kg
- 2018 World S-1 Champion in the weight category up to 71 kg
- 2018 Intercontinental WKU Champion in the weight category up to 72 kg
- 2018 Winner of the Battle of Champions tournament – 10 in the muay thai block
- 2016 World Gpro Champion in the weight category up to 71 kg
- 2015 World W5 Champion in the weight category up to 71 kg
- 2015 Winner of the muay thai Russian Cup in the weight category up to 71 kg

== Fight record ==
Professional Muay Thai and Kickboxing Record
48 fights, 34 Wins (5 KO), 13 Losses, 0 Draw, 1 No Contest
Date	Result	Opponent	Event	Location	Method	Round	Time
2022-07-15	Loss	(Russia) Khayal Dzhaniev	Fair Fight 18	Yekaterinburg, Russia	Decision (Unanimous)	3	3:00
2022-02-26	Win	(Italy) Alessio Malatesta	Senshi 11	Varna. Bulgaria	Ext. R Decision	4	3:00
2022-01-27	Win	(Russia) Vlad Vlasenko	Gpro-Mineev	Moscow, Russia	Decision (Unanimous)	5	3:00
Wins GPRO World -71kg title.
2021-12-04	Win	(France) Alexis Laugeois	Senshi 10	Varna, Bulgaria	Decision (Unanimous)	3	3:00
Defends KWU World -70kg title.
2021-07-10	Win	(Ukraine) Oleg Tsvik	Senshi 9	Varna, Bulgaria	Decision (Unanimous)	3	3:00
Defends KWU World -70kg title.
2021-05-22	Win	(Belarus) Farkhad Akhmedjanov	Senshi 8	Sofia, Bulgaria	Decision (Unanimous)	3	3:00
Defends KWU World -70kg title.
2021-02-27	Win	(Portugal) Dmitry Glevka	Senshi 7	Sofia, Bulgaria	KO (Body)	2	
Wins KWU World -70kg title.
2020-03-21	Loss	(Russia) Vasiliy Semenov	Fair Fight XI	Yekaterinburg, Russia	KO (Punches)	2	
2019-09-14	Loss	(Belarus) Dzianis Zuev|	Kunlun Fight 83	Guizhou, China	Decision (Split)	3	3:00
For the Kunlun Fight Intercontinental -70kg title.
2019-09-14	Win	(China) Song Shaoqiu	Kunlun Fight 83	Guizhou, China	Decision (Unanimous)	3	3:00
2019-07-08	NC	(Thailand) Yodwicha Por Boonsit	Fair Fight IX	Yekaterinburg, Russia	No contest	3	3:00
2019-03-09	Loss	(Thailand) Buakaw Banchamek	All Star Fight 8	Bangkok, Thailand	Decision (Unanimous)	3	3:00
2018-12-22	Win	(Spain) Ayman Nayanesh	Muaythai Factory	Perm, Russia	Decision (Unanimous)	3	3:00
Wins WMC European -70kg title.
2018-11-04	Win	(Russia) Arbi Emiev	Knights ring Moscow suburbs	Roshal, Russia	Decision (Unanimous)	3	
Wins S-1 World -71kg title.
2018-08-05	Win	(China) Zhu Baotong	Kunlun Fight 75	Sanya, China	Ext.R Decision	4	3:00
2018-05-13	Win	(Russia) Danil Vinnik	Prime Selection 2018	Krasnodar, Russia	Decision (Split)	5	3:00
Wins WKU Interconinental -70kg title.
2018-04-16	Win	(Sweden) Magnus Andersson	Battle of Champions – 10	Moscow, Russia	KO	2	
2017-08-27	Loss	(Netherlands) Mohamed Mezouari	Kunlun Fight 65 – World MAX 2017 Final 16	Qingdao, China	TKO (Three Knockdowns/Left Body Hook)	1	
2017-06-10	Loss	(Thailand) Superbon Banchamek	Kunlun Fight 62	Bangkok, Thailand	Decision (Unanimous)	3	3:00
2017-04-23	Win	(Thailand) Jomthong Chuwattana	Kunlun Fight 60 Group G Tournament Final	Guizhou, China	Decision	3	3:00
2017-04-23	Win	(Japan) Yuichiro Nagashima	Kunlun Fight 60 – 70 kg World Max 2017 Group G Tournament Semi-finals	Zunyi, China	TKO (Ref.stop/3 Knockdowns)	2	
2017-02-18	Loss	(Italy) Giorgio Petrosyan	W5 Grand Prix KITEK XXXIX	Moscow, Russia	Decision (unanimous)	5	3:00
Loses the W5 World -70kg title.
2016-03-20	Win	(China) Li Zhuangzhunag	Kunlun Fight 39, 1/16 Final	Guangzhou, China	Decision	3	3:00
2016-03-20	Win	(Australia) Victor Nagbe	Kunlun Fight 39	Guangzhou, China	Decision (Unanimous)	3	3:00
2016-03-05	Win	(Israel) Itay Gershon	Grand Prix Russia Open 19	Moscow, Russia	Decision (Unanimous)	3	3:00
Defends Gpro World -70kg title.
2015-12-05	Win	(Democratic Republic of the Congo) Chris Ngimbi	W5 Grand Prix Vienna XXXI, Final	Vienna, Austria	Decision (unanimous)	3	3:00
Wins the W5 World -70kg title.
2015-12-05	Win	(Brazil) Cosmo Alexandre	W5 Grand Prix Vienna XXXI	Vienna, Austria	Decision (unanimous)	3	3:00
2015-07-01	Loss	(Thailand) Buakaw Banchamek	T-one Muay Thai 2015	Beijing, China	Decision (Unanimous)	3	3:00
2015-02-26	Win	(Azerbaijan) Tural Bayramov	Grand Prix Russia Open 16	Moscow, Russia	Decision	3	3:00
2014-11-16	Loss	(China) Zheng Zhaoyu	Kunlun Fight 13, World Tournament 1/2 Final	Hohhot, China	TKO	3	
2014-10-11	Loss	(Thailand) Petchmankong Petsaman	K-1 World MAX 2014 World Championship Tournament Final	Pattaya, Thailand	Decision (Majority)	3	3:00
2014-10-05	Loss	(Australia) Victor Nagbe	Kunlun Fight 11, World Tournament 1/4 Final	Macao, China	Decision (Split)	3	3:00
2014-07-27	Win	(China) Li Zikai	Kunlun Fight 7, World Tournament 1/8 Final	Henan, China	Decision (Unanimous)	3	3:00
2014-05-22	Loss	(Belarus) Andrei Kulebin	Grand Prix Russia Open 14	Nizhny Novgorod, Russia	Decision (unanimous)	4	3:00
For the IPCC World title.
2014-05-22	Win	(Ukraine) Sergey Kulyaba	Grand Prix Russia Open 14	Nizhny Novgorod, Russia	Decision (Unanimous)	3	3:00
2013-12-22	Win	(Belarus) Oganes Sarfaryan	W5 Grand Prix	Moscow Russia	Decision (Unanimous)	3	3:00
2013-11-16	Win	(Austria) Sascha Jovanovic	W5 Grand Prix Orel	Orel, Russia	Decision (Unanimous)	3	3:00
2013-10-03	Win	(Russia) Ivan Babachenko	Grand Prix Russia Open 13	Nizhny Novgorod, Russia	KO	4	
2013-05-29	Win	(Thailand) Sosom Surachai	Grand Prix Russia Open 12	Nizhny Novgorod, Russia	Decision (Unanimous)	3	3:00
2013-04-24	Win	(Russia) Rasul Kachkaev	W5 Fighter 21	Orel, Russia	Decision (Unanimous)	3	3:00
2013-04-06	Loss	(Ukraine) Sergey Adamchuk	Grand Prix Russia Open 11	Nizhny Novgorod, Russia	Decision (Split)	3	3:00
2012-11-29	Loss	(Belarus) Yuri Zhukovsky	W5 FIGHTER MILK MOSCOW 17	Moscow Russia	Decision (Unanimous)	3	3:00
2012-10-11	Win	(Ukraine) Bogdan Pogorelov	W5 Fighter Moscow XV	Moscow Russia	Decision (Unanimous)	4	
2012-04-19	Win	(Kyrgyzstan) Uzinbek Baydlda	W5 FIGHTER ARENA MOSCOW XII	Moscow Russia	Decision (Unanimous)	3	3:00
2011-11-11	Win	(Ukraine) Dmitri Shilovsky	Crown Cup 6	Moscow Russia	Decision (Unanimous)	3	3:00
2011-10-28	Win	(Belarus) Ramil Navruzov	Crown Cup 4	Moscow Russia	Decision (Unanimous)	3	
2011-09-02	Win	(Russia) Alexei Frolov	Muaythai Prof 11	Kstovo, Russia	Decision (Unanimous)	3	3:00
2009-08-08	Win	(Russia) Artem Kosichkin	Muaythai Prof 5	Nizhny Novgorod, Russia	Decision (Unanimous)	3	3:00
Legend: Win Loss Draw/No contest Notes
