= Vlad Tuinov =

Russian kickboxer

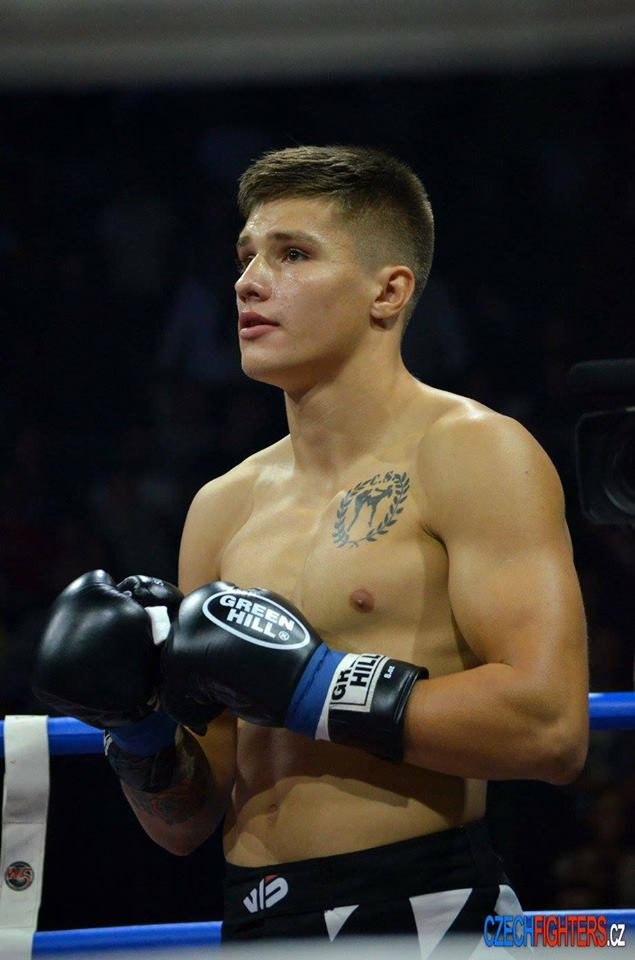
- Born: February 10, 1998 (age 28); Orel, Russia
- Other names: The Diamond, The Orel Diamond
- Nationality: Russian
- Height: 175 cm (5 ft 9 in)
- Weight: 71 kg (157 lb; 11 st)
- Division: Light Middleweight; Middleweight
- Style: Kickboxing
- Stance: Orthodox
- Team: Chadin's School (2005–present)
- Trainer: Andrey Chadin
- Years active: 2005–Present

Professional boxing record
- Total: 6
- Wins: 6
- By knockout: 4
- Losses: 0

Kickboxing record
- Total: 57
- Wins: 52
- By knockout: 17
- Losses: 5
- By knockout: 1
- Draws: 0

Bareknuckle boxing record
- Total: 4
- Wins: 3
- By knockout: 3
- Losses: 0
- Draws: 1

Other information
- Boxing record from BoxRec

Vladislav Vladimirovich Tuinov (Russian: Владислав Владимирович Туйнов); more known as Vlad Tuinov (born February 10, 1998, in Orel, Russia) is a professional Russian kickboxer who competes in the lightweight division.

== Early life ==
Tuinov was born in Orel, Russia to Russian parents. He got involved with kickboxing by accident. Vlad was in fact on his way to a public swimming pool at a local sports center when he walked into the wrong door and right into a class being taught by Andrey Chadin. After talking to each other Vlad decided to start training in kickboxing.

== Professional kickboxing career ==
After 11 professional fights, Vlad fought fellow up-and-coming Russian kickboxer Alexander Kotov on May 9, 2014, in a 5-round fight for the FKR 60 kg Russian title. Vlad would go on to win by unanimous decision. That same year on August 4, Vlad would again go up against another Russian fighter for a second title. This time Vlad defeated Murad Abdulaev for the WFMC 65 kg Russian title by 4th-round KO.

Two years later, on March 6, 2016, Vlad defeated Serbian fighter Nikola Cimesa by unanimous decision, in a 5-round fight, for the WKU 71 kg European title. Later that year, Vlad added W5's coveted 71 kg European title to his waist, when he defeated Turkey's Erkan Varol by TKO in round 3.

2017 turned out be a very successful year for Vlad as he hoisted 3 more titles and twice defended his W5 71 kg European title. On April 6, in a winner takes all fight, Vlad defeated the Dutchman Massaro Glunder by unanimous decision, in a 5-round fight, to retain his W5 71 kg European title and add the 72.5 kg W5 Intercontinental title. On June 17, Vlad defeated France's Bryton Mabel by unanimous decision in 5 rds to become the MTA 71 kg European champion. On September 16 Vlad defended his 71 kg W5 European belt for the second time. He defeated the tough Danish fighter Rhassan Muhareb in what would prove to be a very tough battle for Vlad, as Rhassan was not only able to withstand numerous knock out shots that Vlad was landing but was also finding multiple ways to get through Vlad's defense and land quite a few devastating blows himself. However, by rd. 5, Rhassan was not able to keep up the pace that Vlad had set and ended up being TKO-ed in rd. 5. Later that year, on October 19 Vlad defeated Yazid Boussaha to win his 3rd title of the year, the A1 72 kg World title.

On January 17, 2019, Vlad Tuinov signed a two-year contract with Glory. In his debut fight, on June 22, 2019, Tuinov lost by Split Decision to Michael Palandre at Glory 66 in Paris. On October 12, 2019, Vlad fought his second fight under Glory where he defeated Artur Saladiak at Glory 69 in Düsseldorf, Germany.

From October 19–27 Vlad fought in the WAKO Senior World Championships where he won gold against Nikola Todorovic, who was the 2019 Combat Games winner. To reach the finals, Vlad had to fight some top competitors in the 75 kg weight category, like Belarusian Max Spodarenko, Turkish Ali Cakir, who Vlad faced and defeated by K.O. in the first round at W5's 2017 Grand Prix "Kitek" and Bulgarian Teodor Hristov. Vlad won each bout 3:0, but in the semi-finals against Teodor, Vlad was badly cut. However, he was able to overcome the injury and win in the finals 3:0 to take gold.

== Bare knuckle boxing career ==
Tuinov made his bare-knuckle boxing debut against Makhmud Musalov, also known as "Chess Player" at Top Dog FC 9 on June 25, 2021. He won the fight by a second-round knockout, flooring Musalov with a right cross.

On the 24th of September, 2021 at the Top Dog FC X event Tuinov faced Vitalii Kovalenko, a fighter from Ukraine where Vitalii got brutally knocked out in the second round.

Tuinov faced Pavel Shelest at Top Dog FC 15 on July 16, 2022. The fight ended in a draw, as neither fighter was able to knock the other out within the allotted three rounds.

Tuinov made his Bare Knuckle Fighting Championship debut against Sabri Ben Henia on April 5, 2025 at BKFC 72 Dubai: Day 2. He won the fight by technical knockout in the first round.

== Professional boxing career ==
Tuinov made his boxing debut against Julian Lane on October 7, 2022. He won the fight by a second-round knockout.

== Titles and accomplishments ==
=== Professional ===
- International Sport Karate Association
  - 2024 ISKA Oriental rules World -78 kg Champion
- World version W5
  - 2017 W5 72.5 kg Intercontinental Champion
  - 2016 W5 71.0 kg European Champion (2 defenses)
  - 2016 KO of the Year Award
  - 2016 Bout of the Year Award
  - 2016 Fighter of the Year Award
- World Kickboxing and Karate Union
  - 2016 WKU 71.0 kg European Champion
- Mix Fight Championship
  - 2021 MFC 72.5 kg Tournament Champion
- Orel Professional Kickboxing League
  - 2021 OPKL Pro International 75 kg Champion
- A1 Partouche Kickboxing Tour
  - A1 72.0 kg Champion
- World Sport Fight Martial Arts Council
  - 2014 WFMC 65.0 kg Russian Champion
- 2017 MTA 72.0 kg European Champion
- 2014 FKR 60.0 kg Russian Champion

=== Amateur ===
Kickboxing

- 2011 All-Russian Juniors Martial Arts Games Kickboxing Winner
- 2010 I.L.K. Junior World Cup Kickboxing Winner
- Russian Savate Federation
  - 2009 Russian Savate Championships Winner
- World Pan Amateur Kick Boxing Association
  - 2007 WPKA European Kickboxing Championships Silver Medal
- Russian Kickboxing Federation
  - 3x Russian Kickboxing Championships K-1 Winner (2014, 2015, 2016)
  - 2011 Russian Kickboxing Championships Full-contact Winner
- World Association of Kickboxing Organizations
  - 2019 WAKO World Championships K-1 -75 kg Gold Medal & Best Competitor Award
  - 2019 WAKO Russian Kickboxing Championships K-1 Winner
  - 2014 WAKO Junior World Championships K-1 -67 kg Gold Medal
  - 2013 WAKO Diamond World Cup Junior K-1 Winner

Mixed Martial Arts

- 2012 CIS and Baltic MMA Championships Winner
- International Federation of Elite Fighting
  - 2013 IFEF CK-2 Elite Fighting European Cup Winner
  - 2013 Elite Fighting World Championships Winner
  - 2012 IFEF CK-2 Elite Fighting European Cup Winner

Boxing

- Russian Boxing Federation
  - 2012 Russian Boxing Championships Bronze Medal

Viet Vo Dao

- Russian Vovinam Viet Vo Dao Federation
  - 2011 Russian Viet Vo Dao Championships Winner
  - 2010 Russian Vovinam Championships Winner

== Kickboxing record ==
Professional kickboxing record
52 Wins (17 (T)KO's), 5 Losses
Date	Result	Opponent	Event	Location	Method	Round	Time
2024-04-27	Win	(United States) Manuel Gomez	Road to OKTAGON	Budapest, Hungary	Decision (Unanimous)	5	3:00
Wins the vacant ISKA Oriental rules World -78kg title
2023-09-15	Win	(China) Li Hui	Fight Club REN TV - Cup of Lotus	Elista, Russia	TKO (Punches)	2	1:21
2023-06-15	Win	(China) Tan Xiaofeng	FKR Pro	Saint Petersburg, Russia	Decision (Unanimous)	3	3:00
2023-03-17	Win	(Belarus) Sergey Chernetsky	RAGE Arena 10	Moscow, Russia	TKO (Corner stoppage)	2	
2022-09-02	Win	(Egypt) Ayman Galal	RAGE Arena 4	Moscow, Russia	Decision (Unanimous)	3	3:00
2022-04-22	Win	(Belarus) Maxim Spodarenko	RAGE Arena 1	Moscow, Russia	Decision (Unanimous)	3	3:00
2021-12-11	Win	(Dominican Republic) Johannes Baas	Mix Fight Championship: Fight Club, Final	Frankfurt, Germany	Decision	3	3:00
Won the MFC 72.5 kg Tournament title
2021-12-11	Win	(Germany) Christian Baya	Mix Fight Championship: Fight Club, Semi Finals	Frankfurt, Germany	Decision	3	3:00
2021-10-23	Win	(Uzbekistan) Alisher Karimdzhonov	AliveWater Kickboxing Pro	Nizhniy Novgorod, Russia	Decision	5	3:00
Won the OPKL Pro International 75.0 kg title
2019-12-07	Loss	(Brazil) Bruno Gazani	Glory 73: Shenzhen	Shenzhen, China	KO (Knee to the body)	3	0:23
2019-10-12	Win	(Poland) Artur Saladiak	Glory 69: Düsseldorf	Düsseldorf, Germany	Decision (Unanimous)	3	3:00
2019-06-22	Loss	(France) Michael Palandre	Glory 66: Paris	Paris, France	Decision (Split)	3	3:00
2018-12-08	Win	(Lithuania) Mindaugas Narauskas	Trieste Fight Night	Trieste, Italy	Unanimous Decision	3	3:00
2018-11-24	Win	(France) Mathieu Tavares	Nuit Des Champions 25	Marseille, France	TKO (Punches)	3	
2018-10-13	Loss	(Belarus) Dzianis Zuev	Kunlun Fight 77	Tongling, China	Decision (Majority)	3	3:00
2018-08-05	Win	(Morocco) Ismael Benali	Kunlun Fight 75	Sanya, China	Decision (Unanimous)	3	3:00
2018-04-15	Win	(Japan) Tomoyuki Nishikawa	Kunlun Fight 72	Beijing, China	KO (Left cross)	1	
2018-04-15	Win	(Belgium) Yassin Baltar	Kunlun Fight 72	Beijing, China	Decision (Unanimous)	3	3:00
2018-03-23	Win	(Japan) Yu Hirono	ACB KB 14: Diamonds	Orel, Russia	Decision (Unanimous)	3	3:00
2017-11-25	Win	(Germany) Ridvan Guden	Kingz Fight Night IV	Lüdenscheid, Germany	Decision (Unanimous)	3	3:00
2017-10-19	Win	(France) Yazid Boussaha	World Grand Prix «A1» (Final)	Lyon, France	TKO (arm injury)	1	
Won the A1 72.0 kg World title
2017-10-19	Win	(France) Ludovic Millet	World Grand Prix «A1» (Semi-final)	Lyon, France	TKO (Punches)	1	
2017-09-16	Win	(Denmark) Rhassan Muhareb	W5 "Legends Collide"	Koper, Slovenia	TKO (Left hook to the body)	5	
Retained the W5 71.0 kg European title
2017-07-17	Win	(France) Bryton Mabel	Sangiusto Fight Nights	Trieste, Italy	Decision (Unanimous)	5	3:00
Won the MTA 71.0 kg European title
2017-06-05	Win	(Germany) Sebastien Harms-Mendez	Mix Fight Gala 21	Hellbronn, Germany	Unanimous Decision	3	3:00
2017-04-08	Win	(Netherlands) Massaro Glunder	W5 "The Undefeated"	Dubrovnik, Croatia	Unanimous Decision	5	3:00
Won the W5 72.5 kg Intercontinental title & retained his W5 71kg European title
2017-02-18	Win	(Turkey) Ali Cakir	W5 Grand Prix KITEK XXXIX	Moscow, Russia	KO (Punches)	1	
2016-12-03	Win	(China) Wu Jianan	Mix Fight Gala 20	Frankfurt am Main, Germany	KO (Spinning back kick to the body)	1	
2016-10-08	Win	(Turkey) Erkan Varol	W5 "Legends in Prague"	Prague, Czech Republic	TKO (Left hook to the body)	3	
Won the W5 71 kg European Title
2016-06-18	Loss	(Slovakia) Milan Pales	W5 & Rebuy Stars "Fortune Favors the Brave"	Prievidza, Slovakia	Ext.R Decision (Split)	4	3:00
2016-06-04	Win	(Croatia) Luka Tomic	W5 & Rebuy Stars "Fortune Favors the Brave"	Zagreb, Croatia	Decision (Unanimous)	3	3:00
2016-05-21	Win	(Netherlands) Angaar Nasr	W5 "Never Give Up"	Vienna, Austria	Decision (Split)	3	3:00
2016-04-23	Win	(Netherlands) Cedric Manhoef	W5 Grand Prix KITEK	Moscow, Russia	Decision (Unanimous)	3	3:00
2016-03-06	Win	(Serbia) Nikola Cimesa	Vienna Fight Night	Vienna, Austria	Decision (Unanimous)	5	3:00
Won the WKU 71.0 kg European title
2015-12-05	Win	(Poland) Lukasz Plawecki	W5 "Winner's Energy"	Vienna, Austria	Decision (Unanimous)	3	3:00
2015-11-21	Win	(Turkey) Bilal Messaoudi	KINGZ III	Ludenscheid, Germany	Unanimous Decision	3	3:00
2015-10-31	Loss	(China) Jia Aoqi	Kunlun Fight 33	Changde, China	Decision (Split)	3	3:00
2015-08-30	Win	(Italy) Luca Donadio	W5 "Be the Best"	Moscow, Russia	TKO (retirement)	2	
2015-06-05	Win	(Turkey) Kasim Ayik	Mix Fight Gala 18	Fulda, Germany	KO (Right cross)	2	
2015-05-15	Win	(China) Wu Xuesong	Kunlun Fight 25	Banska Bystrica, Slovakia	Decision (Unanimous)	3	3:00
2015-04-24	Win	(Russia) Robert Kazikhanov	W5 Grand Prix Kitek	Moscow, Russia	KO	3	
2015-03-01	Win	(Croatia) Roko Pintaric	N/A	Vienna, Austria	Decision (Unanimous)	3	3:00
2014-10-30	Win	(Slovakia) Jan Szajko	W5 "The Crossroad of Times"	Bratislava, Slovakia	Decision (Unanimous)	3	3:00
2014-08-04	Win	(Russia) Murad Abdulaev	WFMC	Orel, Russia	KO	4	
Won the WFMC 65.0 kg Russian title
2014-06-21	Win	(Austria) Mohammed Soliman	W5 Grand Prix Open Air XXV	Piešťany, Slovakia	KO	1	
2014-05-09	Win	(Russia) Alexander Kotov	FKR	Kozelsk, Russia	Decision (Unanimous)	5	3:00
Won the FKR 60.0 kg Russian title
2014-03-01	Win	(Slovakia) Jan Szajko	W5 GRAND PRIX OREL XXIV	Orel, Russia	Decision (Unanimous)	3	3:00
2013-12-22	Win	(Russia) Aleksei Krasnov	W5 Grand Prix Moscow XXIII	Moscow, Russia	KO		
2013-11-16	Win	(Russia) Aleksei Brosov	W5 Grand Prix Orel XXII	Orel, Russia	Decision (Unanimous)	3	3:00
2013-01-22	Win	(Germany) Eduard Feit	Big Kickboxing in Orel	Orel, Russia	Decision (Unanimous)	3	3:00
2012-11-29	Win	(Russia) Ruzil Davletshin	W5 Fighter Milk Moscow XVII	Moscow, Russia	Decision (Unanimous)	3	3:00
2012-11-11	Win	(Russia) Vladislav Vlasenko	W5 Fighter Milk Moscow XV	Moscow, Russia	Decision (Unanimous)	3	3:00
2011-09-25	Win	(Russia) Evgeny Tokov	Galaxy Fight Show	Orel, Russia	Decision (Unanimous)	3	3:00
2011-04-13	Win	(Russia) Agazar Zhakhmaryan	Galaxy Fight Show	Orel, Russia	Decision (Unanimous)	3	3:00
2010-10-03	Win	(Russia) Artyom Turov	King of Ring V	Orel, Russia	Decision (Split)	3	3:00
2008-12-08	Win	(Russia) Andrey Butirin	Galaxy Fight Show	Orel, Russia	Decision (Unanimous)	3	3:00
Legend: Win Loss Draw/No contest Notes

Amateur kickboxing record
Date	Result	Opponent	Event	Location	Method	Round	
2019-10-27	Win	(Serbia) Nikola Todorović	2019 WAKO World Championships, Tournament Final	Sarajevo, Bosnia and Herzegovina	TKO (punches)	2	
Won the 2019 WAKO World Championships K-1 -75kg Gold Medal.
2019-10-26	Win	(Bulgaria) Teodor Hristov	2019 WAKO World Championships, Tournament Semi Final	Sarajevo, Bosnia and Herzegovina	Decision (unanimous)	3	2:00
2019-10-25	Win	(Turkey) Ali Cakir	2019 WAKO World Championships, Tournament Quarter Final	Sarajevo, Bosnia and Herzegovina	Decision (unanimous)	3	2:00
2019-10-24	Win	(Belarus) Maks Spadarenka	2019 WAKO World Championships, Tournament Second Round	Sarajevo, Bosnia and Herzegovina	Decision (unanimous)	3	2:00
2019-10-23	Win	(Greece) Theofilos Parotsidis	2019 WAKO World Championships, Tournament First Round	Sarajevo, Bosnia and Herzegovina	Decision (unanimous)	3	2:00
2014-09-	Win	(Poland) Kacper Muszyński	2014 WAKO Cadets and Juniors World Championships, Final	Rimini, Italy	Decision	3	2:00
Wins 2014 WAKO Cadets and Juniors World Championships K-1 Junior -67kg Gold Medal.
2014-09-	Win	(Belarus) Mikita Sapranko	2014 WAKO Cadets and Juniors World Championships, Semifinals	Rimini, Italy	Decision	3	2:00
2014-09-	Win	(Canada) Jacob Quinton	2014 WAKO Cadets and Juniors World Championships, Quarterfinals	Rimini, Italy	Decision	3	2:00
Legend: Win Loss Draw/No contest Notes

== Professional boxing record ==
6 fights	6 wins	0 losses
By knockout	4	0
By decision	2	0

No.	Result	Record	Opponent	Type	Round, time	Date	Location	Notes
6	Win	6-0	Timur Nikulin	TKO	2 (8) 1:25	Jun 7, 2025	Krasnoyarsk, Russia	
5	Win	5-0	Diego Gabriel Chaves	UD	6	May 25, 2024	Vladikavkaz, Russia	
4	Win	4-0	Eric Moon	KO	1 (6) 2:47	Dec 22, 2023	Moscow, Russia	
3	Win	3-0	Ferdi Altun	TKO	1 (4) 1:53	Feb 17, 2023	Krasnogorsk, Russia	
2	Win	2-0	Jonatan Oliveira	PTS	4	Dec 23, 2022	Chelyabinsk, Russia	
1	Win	1–0	Julian Lane	KO	2 (4) 0:35	Oct 7, 2022	Moscow, Russia	

== Bare knuckle boxing record ==
Professional record breakdown
4 matches	3 wins	0 losses
By knockout	3	0
Draws	1	

Res.	Record	Opponent	Method	Event	Date	Round	Time	Location	Notes
Win	3–0–1	Sabri Ben Henia	TKO (punches)	BKFC 72 Dubai: Day 2	April 5, 2025	1	0:26	Dubai, United Arab Emirates	
Draw	2–0–1	Pavel Shelest	Decision	Top Dog FC 15	July 16, 2022	3	2:00	Moscow, Russia	
Win	2–0	Vitalii Kovalenko	KO (Right hook)	Top Dog FC X	September 24, 2021	2	1:20	Moscow, Russia	
Win	1–0	Makhmud Musalov	KO (Right cross)	Top Dog FC 9	June 25, 2021	2	0:33	Moscow, Russia	
