= Sergej Braun =

German kickboxer

- Born: July 17, 1989 (age 37); Fulda, Germany
- Height: 179 cm (5 ft 10 in)
- Weight: 85 kg (187 lb; 13.4 st)
- Division: Middleweight
- Style: Kyokushin, Kickboxing
- Stance: Orthodox
- Team: Brauns Gym
- Years active: 2013–present

Kickboxing record
- Total: 64
- Wins: 48
- By knockout: 27
- Losses: 16
- By knockout: 6

Sergej Braun (born July 17, 1989) is a German kickboxer and karateka, currently competing in the middleweight division of Glory.

As of December 2022, Braun is ranked as the ninth best middleweight in the world by Beyond Kick and sixth best by Combat Press. He first entered both rankings in October 2022.

== Professional kickboxing career ==
=== Mix Fight ===
Braun challenged Lorand Sachs for the WKU Middleweight K-1 championship at Apache Fight Night on October 1, 2013. He won the fight by a second-round knockout. He mad his first title defense against Taylan Yesil on June 7, 2014. He won the fight by unanimous decision.

Braun was scheduled to participate in the 2017 Mix Fight -78.5 kg Tournament, which was held at Mix Fight Gala 21 on May 6, 2017. He faced Akam Tarageh in the semifinals of the one-day tournament. Braun won the fight by unanimous decision and advanced to finals, where he faced the Lion Fight Super Middleweight champion. He lost the final bout by a first-round knockout.

Braun faced Yohan Lidon at DSF Kickboxing Challenge 13 on March 9, 2018. He lost the fight by a second-round knockout. Braun next faced Shkodran Veseli at Enfusion 64 on April 21, 2018. He lost the fight by a first-round technical knockout. Braun was booked to face Arian Sadiković at Mix Fight Championship 25 on December 1, 2018. He lost the fight by a narrowly contested split decision.

Braun faced Stipe Mrsic at Fightarena 5 on May 11, 2019. He won the fight by a first-round technical knockout. Braun was scheduled to face Juri De Sousa in an -80 kg Mix Fight title eliminator, which was held at Mix Fight Championship 26 on June 22, 2019. He lost the fight by unanimous decision.

Braun ext faced Mustafa Genc at CWS Fight Night 5 on October 26, 2019. He won the fight by unanimous decision.

Braun took part in the 2019 Mix Fight welterweight (-77 kg) tournament. He faced Lukasz Plawecki in the semifinals of the one-day tournament, held at Mix Fight Championship 27 on December 7, 2019, and was able to win by a third-round knockout. Braun captured the tournament title with a third-round head kick knockout of Brice Kombou in the finals.

=== Senshi ===
After capturing the welterweight Mix Fight tournament title, Braun was booked to face Blokland Guillermo at Battle Of Barock on February 1, 2020. He won the fight by unanimous decision. Braun returned to Senshi for his second and final fight of the year, as he faced Daniel Manole at SENSHI 6 on August 21, 2020. He needed just 40 seconds to stop Manole with a spinning back kick.

Braun challenged the WAKO-Pro World K-1 Light Heavyweight (-81.4 kg) champion Aleksander Menković at SENSHI 7 on February 27, 2021. He won the fight by a third-round knockout. Braun knocked his opponent down twice prior to the stoppage, with both knockdowns happening in the third round, first time with a left hook and the second time with a right uppercut. The fight was finally stopped after he knocked Menković down with a head kick, which left the Serbian unable to beat rise from the canvas.

Braun was expected to face the WAKO-Pro World K-1 Super Middleweight champion Nikola Todorović in a non-title bout on Senshi 8 on May 22, 2021. Braun withdrew from the fight after testing positive for COVID-19. Braun instead faced Samuel Dbili at SENSHI 9 on July 10. He won the fight by a dominant unanimous decision.

Braun was once again booked to face Nikola Todorović in a non-title bout at SENSHI 10 on December 3, 2021. Todorovic later withdrew from the bout, after testing positive for COVID-19, and was replaced by Assane Bafeta. Braun won the fight by a third-round knockout. He dropped Bafeta with a short left hook, and although Bafeta was able to beat the eight-count, he was unsteady on his feet which prompted the referee to wave the bout off.

Braun and Nikola Todorović were scheduled to fight for the third time at SENSHI 11 on February 26, 2022. Braun won the fight by unanimous decision. He scored the sole knockdown of the fight late in the third round, although he was unable to finish the Serbian. Braun next faced Chico Kwasi at Super Cup Kickboxing 2 on April 30, 2022. Kwasi snapped Braun's eight-fight winning streak, as he won the fight by unanimous decision. Braun was however able to rebounded from this loss with a unanimous decision win over Daniel Krost at Prestige Championship 2 on June 4, 2022.

=== Glory ===
Braun made his Glory debut against Michael Boapeah at Glory: Collision 4 on October 8, 2022. He won the fight by unanimous decision. Braun scored the sole knockdown of the fight in the third round, as he dropped Boapeah with a left hook in the final minute of the fight.

Braun made his first WAKO-Pro World Light Heavyweight (-81.4 kg) title defense against Baris Turkmen at Battle Of Barock 2 on October 29, 2022. He retained the title by a second-round technical knockout.

Braun faced the #2 ranked Glory middleweight contender Serkan Ozcaglayan at Glory 83 on February 11, 2023. He lost the fight by a fourth-round knockout.

Braun faced Michael Boapeah at Glory 87 on August 19, 2023, having beat Boapeah in his debut 10 months prior. He lost the fight by unanimous decision.

Braun faced Mohamed Touchassie at Glory 92 on May 18, 2024. He won the fight by unanimous decision.

Braun made his second WAKO-Pro K-1 World Light Heavyweight (-81.4 kg) title defense against Bilal Bakhouche-Chareuf at Battle of Barock III on May 25, 2024. He won the fight by unanimous decision.

Braun challenged Donovan Wisse for the Glory Middleweight Championship at Glory 96 on October 12, 2024. He lost the fight by unanimous decision.

Braun made his third WAKO-Pro K-1 World Light Heavyweight (-81.4 kg) title defense against Ali Yuzeir at Battle of Barock IV on April 5, 2025. He won the fight by unanimous decision.

Braun faced Iliass Hammouche at Glory 104, on October 11, 2025. He would win the bout via disqualification in the second round. Braun dropped Hammouche with an overhand left shortly into the second round, causing Hammouche to fly into a rage and shove the referee. After several minutes of deliberation, He would leave the ring, and subsequently be disqualified.

== Championships and accomplishments ==
=== Kickboxing ===
- International Sport Kickboxing Association
  - 2026 ISKA K-1 World Light-heavyweight (-81.5kg) Championship
- World Fighting League
  - 2026 WFL World -85kg Championship
- World Association of Kickboxing Organizations
  - 2021 WAKO-Pro World K-1 Light Heavyweight (-81.4 kg) Championship
    - Three successful title defenses
- Mix Fight Championship
  - 2019 Mix Fight Welterweight (-77 kg) Tournament Winner
- All Fight System Organization
  - 2019 AFSO Super Light Heavyweight (-82 kg) Championship
- World Kickboxing and Karate Union
  - 2013 WKU European Middleweight (-85 kg) K-1 Championship
  - 2014 WKU World Middleweight (-85 kg) K-1 Championship
    - One successful title defense
  - 2026 WKU K-1 World -86 kg Championship
- World Sport Fight Martial Arts Council
  - 2014 WFMC Middleweight (-84.6 kg) Championship
- World Kickboxing Federation
  - 2012 WKF -81 kg Championship

=== Karate ===
- International Federation of Karate
  - 2013 IFK World Open Middleweight (-80 kg) 3rd place
- Kyokushin Union (IKO Kyokushinkaikan Rengokai)
  - 2015 Rengokai World Cup -80 kg 3rd place
- WKO Shinkyokushinkai
  - 3x Shinkyokushin Dutch Open Middleweight Winner (2013, 2014, 2015)
  - 2014 Shinkyokushin West European Championship Diamond Cup Middleweight Winner
  - 2016 Shinkyokushin West European Championship Diamond Cup Middleweight 3rd place

== Professional kickboxing record ==
Kickboxing record
48 Wins (28 (T)KO's), 16 Losses, 0 Draws
Date	Result	Opponent	Event	Location	Method	Round	Time
2026-10-24	Win	(Cameroon) Brice Kombou	K-1 World GP 2027 -90kg in Dortmund - World Fighting League	Dortmund, Germany	Decision (Unanimous)	5	3:00
Won the vacant WFL Middleweight (-85kg) title, the vacant ISKA K-1 World Light-heavyweight (-81.5kg) title and the vacant WKU K-1 World -86kg title.
2026-04-25	Loss	(Nigeria) Joshua Akingbade	Battle of Barock V, Semifinals	Fulda, Germany	Decision (Unanimous)	3	3:00
2025-10-11	Win	(Morocco) Iliass Hammouche	Glory 104	Rotterdam, Netherlands	Disqualification	2	
2025-04-05	Win	(Bulgaria) Ali Yuzeir	Battle of Barock IV	Fulda, Germany	Decision (Unanimous)	5	3:00
Defends the WAKO-Pro K-1 World Light Heavyweight (-81.4 kg) title.
2024-10-12	Loss	(Suriname) Donovan Wisse	Glory 96	Rotterdam, Netherlands	Decision (Unanimous)	5	3:00
For the Glory Middleweight Championship.
2024-05-25	Win	(France) Bilal Bakhouche-Chareuf	Battle of Barock III	Fulda, Germany	Decision (Unanimous)	5	3:00
Defends the WAKO-Pro K-1 World Light Heavyweight (-81.4 kg) title.
2024-05-18	Win	(Morocco) Mohamed Touchassie	Glory 92	Rotterdam, Netherlands	Decision (Unanimous)	3	3:00
2023-08-19	Loss	(Ghana) Michael Boapeah	Glory 87	Rotterdam, Netherlands	Decision (Unanimous)	3	3:00
2023-02-11	Loss	(Turkey) Serkan Ozcaglayan	Glory 83	Essen, Germany	KO (Left hook)	2	2:40
2022-10-29	Win	(Turkey) Baris Turkmen	Battle Of Barock 2	Fulda, Germany	TKO (Punches)	2	2:07
Defended the WAKO-Pro K-1 World Light Heavyweight (-81.4 kg) title.
2022-10-08	Win	(Ghana) Michael Boapeah	Glory: Collision 4	Arnhem, Netherlands	Decision (Majority)	3	3:00
2022-06-04	Win	(Germany) Daniel Krost	Prestige Championship 2	Heilbronn, Germany	Decision (Unanimous)	3	3:00
2022-04-30	Loss	(Netherlands) Chico Kwasi	Super Cup Kickboxing 2	Erzhausen, Germany	Decision (Unanimous)	3	3:00
2022-02-26	Win	(Serbia) Nikola Todorović	SENSHI 11	Varna, Bulgaria	Decision (Unanimous)	3	3:00
2021-12-03	Win	(Ivory Coast) Assane Bafeta	SENSHI 10	Varna, Bulgaria	KO (Left hook)	2	
2021-07-10	Win	(France) Samuel Dbili	SENSHI 9	Varna, Bulgaria	Decision (Unanimous)	3	3:00
2021-02-27	Win	(Serbia) Aleksander Menković	SENSHI 7	Varna, Bulgaria	KO (Head kick)	3	
Won the WAKO-Pro K-1 World Light Heavyweight (-81.4 kg) title.
2020-08-21	Win	(Romania) Daniel Manole	SENSHI 6	Varna, Bulgaria	KO (Spinning back kick)	1	0:40
2020-02-01	Win	(Suriname) Guillermo Blokland	Battle Of Barock	Fulda, Germany	Decision (Unanimous)	3	3:00
2019-12-07	Win	(Cameroon) Brice Kombou	Mix Fight Championship 27, -77 kg Tournament Finals	Frankfurt, Germany	KO (Head kick)	3	1:41
Won the Mix Fight -77 kg Tournament title.
2019-12-07	Win	(Poland) Lukasz Plawecki	Mix Fight Championship 27, -77 kg Tournament Semifinals	Frankfurt, Germany	KO (Head kick)	3	1:41
2019-10-26	Win	(Turkey) Mustafa Genc	CWS Fight Night 5	Neu-Ulm, Germany	Decision (Unanimous)	3	3:00
2019-06-22	Loss	(Portugal) Juri De Sousa	Mix Fight Championship 26	Kassel, Germany	Decision (Unanimous)	3	3:00
2019-05-11	Win	(Croatia) Stipe Mrsic	Fightarena 5	Heilbronn, Germany	TKO (Punches)	1	
2019-04-20	Win	(Japan) Akira Umemura	Senshi 2	Varna, Bulgaria	Decision (Unanimous)	3	3:00
2019-02-23	Win	(Slovenia) Hamza Sivro	Super Cup Kickboxing	Erzhausen, Germany	TKO (Punches)	2	2:59
Won the AFSO Super Light Heavyweight -82 kg title.
2018-12-01	Loss	(Bosnia and Herzegovina) Arian Sadiković	Mix Fight Championship 25	Poland	Decision (Split)	3	3:00
2018-04-21	Loss	(Albania) Shkodran Veseli	Enfusion 64	Dillingen, Germany	TKO	1	3:00
2018-03-09	Loss	(France) Yohan Lidon	DSF Kickboxing Challenge 13	Poland	KO (Front Kick to the Body)	2	
2017-12-02	Win	(Poland) Bartosz Zajac	Mix Fight Championship 23	Frankfurt, Germany	Decision (Unanimous)	3	3:00
2017-10-07	Win	(Germany) Ramon Kubler	Enfusion Live 54	Ludwigsburg, Germany	Decision (Unanimous)	3	3:00
2017-05-06	Loss	(Suriname) Regian Eersel	Mix Fight Gala 21, -78.5 kg Tournament Finals	Heilbronn, Germany	KO (Liver shot)	1	
For the Mix Fight -78.5 kg Tournament title.
2017-05-06	Win	(Iran) Akam Tarageh	Mix Fight Gala 21, -78.5 kg Tournament Semifinals	Heilbronn, Germany	Decision (Unanimous)	3	3:00
2016-12-03	Win	(Switzerland) Philipp Hafeli	Wu Lin Feng 2016: WLF x Mix Fight Gala 20 - China vs Europe	China	TKO	2	
2016-10-16	Loss	(Russia) Islam Beibatyrov	ACB KB 8: Only The Braves	Hoofddorp, Netherlands	KO (Punch)	3	
2016-09-17	Win	(Germany) Alexander Schmitt	It's Fight Time 3	Darmstadt, Germany	KO (Spinning heel kick)	3	
2016-06-13	Loss	(Ukraine) Volodymyr Artemenko	Welcome to the East	Erfurt, Germany	Decision (Split)	3	3:00
2016-04-28	Loss	(Russia) Alim Ozhev	Tatneft Cup, -80 kg Tournament	Kazan, Russia	Decision	3	3:00
2015-10-16	Win	(Romania) Dorin Stan	ACB KB 3: Grand Prix Final	Sibiu, Romania	Decision (Unanimous)	3	3:00
2015-06-05	Win	(Greece) Alexandros Chatzichronoglou	Mix Fight Gala	Fulda, Germany	Decision	3	3:00
2015-04-29	Loss	(Russia) Timur Aylyarov	Tatneft Cup, -80 kg Tournament Quarter Final	Kazan, Russia	Decision (Unanimous)	3	3:00
2015-03-21	Loss	(Turkey) Ertugrul Bayrak	Night of the Champions 3	Frankfurt, Germany	Decision	3	3:00
2015-02-21	Win	(Czech Republic) Matous Kohout	Tatneft Cup, -80 kg Tournament Opening Round	Kazan, Russia	KO (Liver shot)	2	1:09
2014-10-04	Loss	(Suriname) Darryl Sichtman	Mix Fight Gala XVI	Fulda, Germany	KO		
2014-04-07	Win	(Turkey) Taylan Yesil	Apache Fight Night	Aschaffenburg, Germany	Decision (Unanimous)	5	3:00
Defended the WKU World Middleweight -85 kg K-1 title.
2014-03-17	Win	(Turkey) Ertugrul Bayrak	Night of the Champions	Fulda, Germany	TKO (Injury)	2	3:00
Won the WFMC -84.6 kg title.
2013-10-01	Win	(Germany) Lorand Sachs	Apache Fight Night	Fulda, Germany	KO (Head kick)	2	
Won the WKU World Middleweight -85 kg K-1 title.
2013-06-07	Win	(Germany) Daniel Dörrer	Steko Fight Night	Munchen, Germany	Decision (Unanimous)	3	3:00
2013-03-09	Win	(Germany) Denis Liebau	Apache Fight Night	Frankfurt, Germany	KO (Spinning back kick)	1	
Won the WKU European Middleweight -85 kg K-1 title.
2012-10-06	Win	(Iran) Mohammad Reza Farohi	Fight Factory	Waldkirch, Germany	KO (Head kick)	2	1:30
Won the WKF -81 kg title.
Legend: Win Loss Draw/No contest Notes

== See also ==
- List of male kickboxers
