= Vedat Hödük =

Turkish kickboxer (born 1994)

- Born: Vedat Kahramanoğlu; April 2, 1994 (age 32); Istanbul, Turkey
- Height: 180 cm (5 ft 11 in)
- Weight: 77 kg (170 lb; 12 st)
- Style: Kickboxing
- Fighting out of: Istanbul, Turkey
- Team: Solak Academy Body Punch Club

Kickboxing record
- Total: 51
- Wins: 41
- By knockout: 21
- Losses: 9
- By knockout: 2
- Draws: 1

Other information
- University: Marmara University

Vedat Hödük is a Turkish kickboxer.

As of July 2025, he was the No.10 ranked welterweight kickboxer in the world by Beyond Kick.

== Career ==
On June 5, 2014, Hödük faced Cédric Doumbé in Mionnay, France. The fight ended in a draw after three rounds.

On April 16, 2015, Hödük entered the Partouche Kickboxing Tour qualification 4-man tournament. He knocked out Raphael Rizzi and Damien Ozenne both in the first round to qualify for the Partouche Kickboxing Tour Final.

On October 15, 2015, Hödük took part in the A1 Partouche Kickboxing Tour Final tournament. He defeated Toufik Essarahoui by decision in the semifinals. In the final he faced Cédric Doumbé and lost the fight by unanimous decision, after an extra round.

On October 13, 2016, Hödük entered the A1 Partouche Kickboxing Tour Final Tournament. In the semi-finals he defeated Julien de Boisrolin. In the finals, he rematched Cédric Doumbé and lost by third-round knockout.

On February 4, 2017, Hödük faced Dimitris Chiotis at Prize Fighter 2 in Melbourne, Australia. He won the fight by fifth round knockout.

On October 18, 2018, Hödük took part in the Partouche Kickboxing Tour Final tournament. in the semifinals he defeated Alassane Sy by technical knockout in the first round after two knockdowns on punches. In the final he stopped Karim Benmansour in the first round forcing a corner stoppage.

Hödük entered a 4-man tournament at La Nuit des Titans on March 30, 2019. In the semifinals he defeated Armen Hovhannisyan by decision. In the final he knocked out Zakaria Laaouatni in 40 seconds.

Hödük faced Jimmy Vienot for the newly created Arena Fight K-1 -75 kg title on June 8, 2019. He lost the fight by unanimous decision.

On October 26, 2019, Hödük made his Glory debut against Jamie Bates at Glory 70. He lost the fight by unanimous decision.

Hödük was called on short notice to fight Mohamed Mezouari on September 4, 2021, at Glory 78: Arnhem. He lost fight by first-round technical knockout.

On November 1, 2021, Hödük faced Nikola Todorović at Superkombat Universe for the inaugural Superkombat 77 kg World title. He won the fight by split decision.

Hödük was scheduled to face Chico Kwasi at KOK 107 - Mega Fight Arena on December 9, 2022, for the inaugural Mega Fight Arena -77 kg title in Istanbul, Turkey. He lost the fight by extension round split decision.

On February 11, 2023, Hödük knocked out Lilian Porcieranu in the first round with sepctacular high kick at UAM Fight Night K1 in Abu Dhabi.

Hödük was booked to face Arian Sadiković at Glory 95 on September 21, 2024. He won the fight by split decision, after an extra fourth round was contested.

== Titles and accomplishments ==
- Superkombat Fighting Championship
  - 2021 Superkombat World Super Middleweight (-77 kg) Champion
- A1 World Combat Cup
  - 2013 A1 World Middleweight (-75 kg) Champion
    - Two successful title defenses
  - 2013 A1 World Grand Prix Tournament Winner
- Partouche Kickboxing Tour
  - 2015 A1 Partouche Kickboxing Tour -75 kg Tournament Runner-up
  - 2016 A1 Partouche Kickboxing Tour -75 kg Tournament Runner-up
  - 2018 A1 Partouche Kickboxing Tour -77 kg Tournament Winner

== Kickboxing record ==
Professional Kickboxing Record
41 Wins (21 (T)KO's), 9 Losses, 1 Draw
Date	Result	Opponent	Event	Location	Method	Round	Time
2026-09-05	Loss	(Serbia) Nikola Todorović	Glory 109	Rotterdam, Netherlands	Decision (Unanimous)	3	3:00
2025-12-06	Win	(Brazil) Cicero Evangelista	SENSHI 29	Varna, Bulgaria	Decision (Unanimous)	3	3:00
2025-06-26	Win	(Morocco) Mohamed El Jaghdal	Mega Fight Arena Series	Istanbul, Turkey	TKO	2	
2024-09-21	Win	(Bosnia and Herzegovina) Arian Sadiković	Glory 95	Zagreb, Croatia	Ext.R Decision (Split)	4	3:00
2023-02-11	Win	(Italy) Lilian Porcireanu	UAM Fight Night	Abu Dhabi, UAE	TKO (High kick)	1	3:00
2022-12-09	Loss	(Netherlands) Chico Kwasi	KOK’107 - Mega Fight Arena Series 1	Istanbul, Turkey	Ext. R. Decision (Split)	4	3:00
For the Mega Fight Arena Welterweight (−77 kg) title.
2021-11-20	Loss	(Russia) Maxim Sulgin	RCC Intro 18	Yekaterinburg, Russia	Decision (Unanimous)	3	3:00
2021-11-01	Win	(Serbia) Nikola Todorović	SuperKombat Universe	Dubai, United Arab Emirates	Decision (Split)	3	3:00
Wins the inaugural Superkombat World Super Middleweight (-77 kg) title.
2021-09-04	Loss	(Morocco) Hamicha	Glory 78: Rotterdam	Rotterdam, Netherlands	TKO (Punch to the body)	1	1:20
2019-10-26	Loss	(United Kingdom) Jamie Bates	Glory 70: Lyon	Lyon, France	Decision (Unanimous)	3	3:00
2019-06-08	Loss	(France) Jimmy Vienot	Arena Fight	Aix en Provence, France	Decision (Unanimous)	5	3:00
For the inaugural Arena Fight K-1 -75kg title.
2019-04-27	Loss	(Australia) Charlie Bubb	Kings Of Kombat 24	Melbourne, Australia	Decision (Unanimous)	5	3:00
2019-03-30	Win	(France) Zakaria Laaouatni	La Nuit Des Titans, Final	Tours, France	KO (Left hook)	1	0:44
2019-03-30	Win	(Armenia) Armen Hovhannisyan	La Nuit Des Titans, Semifinals	Tours, France	Decision	3	3:00
2019-03-19	Win	(Germany) James Edward	Best Fighters Night	Turkey	Decision (Unanimous)	3	3:00
2018-12-08	Win	(Australia) Frank Giorgi	Kings Of Kombat 23	Melbourne, Australia	Decision (Unanimous)	5	3:00
2018-10-18	Win	(France) Karim Benmansour	Partouche Kickboxing Tour - Final Tournament, Final	Tours, France	TKO (Corner stoppage)	1	1:58
Wins the 2018 Partouche Kickboxing Tour -77kg Tournament title.
2018-10-18	Win	(France) Alassane Sy	Partouche Kickboxing Tour - Final Tournament, Semifinals	Tours, France	TKO (2 Knockdowns)	1	2:26
2018-08-28	Win	(Greece) Giannis Sofokleous	Live Your Heart	Istanbul, Turkey	TKO (Corner stoppage)	1	3:00
2018-06-22	Win	(Belgium) Alka Matewa	A1 World Grand Prix	Algiers, Algeria	KO (Body punches)	1	2:55
2018-06-09	Win	(Spain) Maximo Suarez	La Nuit De l'Impact IV	Saintes, France	Decision (Split)	3	3:00
2018-04-07	Win	(France) Benjamin Gerbet	Partouche Kickboxing Tour - Qualification Tournament, Final	Saint-Amand-les-Eaux, France	Decision (Unanimous)	3	3:00
Qualifies for the 2018 Partouche Kickboxing Tour Final Tournament.
2018-04-07	Win	(Netherlands) Serginio Kanters	Partouche Kickboxing Tour - Qualification Tournament, Semifinals	Saint-Amand-les-Eaux, France	Decision (Unanimous)	3	3:00
2017-05-06	Win	(Albania) Kadri Murseli	Phenix Boxing Only Edition 5	Saint-Julien-en-Genevois, France	Decision	3	3:00
2017-02-04	Win	(Greece) Dimitris Chiotis	Prize Fighter 2	Melbourne, Australia	KO (Spinning back kick)	5	0:18
2016-10-13	Loss	(France) Cédric Doumbé	Partouche Kickboxing Tour 2016 - Final Tournament, Final	La Tour-de-Salvagny, France	KO (Uppercut)	3	
For the 2016 Partouche Kickboxing Tour Tournament title.
2016-10-13	Win	(France) Julien De Boisrolin	Partouche Kickboxing Tour 2016 - Final Tournament, Semifinals	La Tour-de-Salvagny, France	TKO (Left hook)	3	
2016-06-10	Win	(France) Walid Haddad	Partouche Kickboxing Tour 2016 - Qualification Tournament, Final	Baar, Switzerland	Decision	3	3:00
Qualifies for the 2016 Partouche Kickboxing Tour Final Tournament.
2016-06-10	Win	(France) Sofian M'Wayembe	Partouche Kickboxing Tour 2016 - Qualification Tournament, Semifinals	Baar, Switzerland	TKO (3 knockdowns)	3	
2016-05-27	Win	(New Zealand) Chase Haley	Prize Fighter	Melbourne, Australia	KO (Spinning wheel kick)	3	3:00
Defends the A1 World Middleweight title.
2016-03-19	Win	(Romania) Eduard Mircea	The Warriors	Borgo, France	Decision	3	3:00
2015-10-15	Loss	(France) Cédric Doumbé	2015 A1 Partouche Kickboxing Tour - Final Tournament, Final	La Tour-de-Salvagny, France	Ext. R Decision (Unanimous)	4	3:00
For the 2015 A1 Partouche Kickboxing Tour -75kg Tournament title.
2015-10-15	Win	(Morocco) Toufik Essarahoui	2015 A1 Partouche Kickboxing Tour - Final Tournament, Semifinals	La Tour-de-Salvagny, France	Decision (Unanimous)	3	3:00
2015-05-16	Win	(Morocco) Hamicha	A1 World Combat Cup Platinium	Eindhoven, Netherlands	Decision	3	3:00
2015-04-16	Win	(France) Damien Ozenne	Partouche Kickboxing Tour 2015 - Qualification Tournament, Final	Saint-Amand-les-Eaux, France	KO (Left hook to the body)	1	3:00
Qualifies for the 2015 A1 Partouche Kickboxing Tour Final Tournament.
2015-04-16	Win	(France) Rapahel Rizzi	Partouche Kickboxing Tour 2015 - Qualification Tournament, Semifinals	Saint-Amand-les-Eaux, France	TKO (2 Knockdowns)	1	2:20
2014-06-05	Draw	(France) Cédric Doumbé	Kader Marouf Presents at Garden Golf Club Mionnay	Mionnay, France	Decision	3	3:00
2014-05-17	Win	(Netherlands) Eyevan Danenberg	A1 World Combat Cup Final 16	Eindhoven, Netherlands	Decision	3	3:00
2014-02-28	Win	(Australia) Dave Mulavai	A1 Kick & Boxing	Melbourne, Australia	Decision (Unanimous)	5	3:00
Defends the A1 World Middleweight title.
2013-12-13	Win	(Australia) Michael Badato	A1 World Grand Prix 2013, Final	Melbourne, Australia	KO (Punches)	1	2:00
Wins the 2013 A1 World Grand Prix Middleweight title.
2013-12-13	Win	(Afghanistan) Maseh Nuristani	A1 World Grand Prix 2013, Semifinals	Melbourne, Australia	Decision (Unanimous)	3	3:00
2013-12-13	Win	(Thailand) Jamnian Srikam	A1 World Grand Prix 2013, Quarterfinals	Melbourne, Australia	KO (High kick)	1	1:40
2013-08-30	Win	(Afghanistan) Maseh Nuristani	A1	Melbourne, Australia	Decision (Unanimous)	5	3:00
Wins the A1 World Middleweight title.
2013-05-31	Win	(France) Abdallah Mabel	A1 World Grand Prix Qualification Tournament, Final	Istanbul, Turkey	Decision	3	3:00
Qualifies for the 2013 A1 World Grand Prix Tournament.
2013-05-31	Win	(Iran) Abbas Malahamadi	A1 World Grand Prix Qualification Tournament, Semifinals	Istanbul, Turkey	KO (Punches)	2	1:50
Legend: Win Loss Draw/No contest Notes
