= Dzianis Zuev =

Belarusian kickboxer

- Born: April 3, 1988 (age 38); Minsk, Byelorussian Soviet Socialist Republic
- Native name: Денис Зуев
- Other names: Belarus Treasures
- Nationality: Belarus
- Height: 1.78 m (5 ft 10 in)
- Weight: 70 kg (154 lb; 11 st)
- Division: Welterweight; Middleweight
- Style: Boxing; Kickboxing
- Stance: Southpaw
- Fighting out of: Minsk, Belarus
- Team: Gridin Gym

Kickboxing record
- Total: 45
- Wins: 30
- Losses: 15
- By knockout: 0
- Last updated on: February 28, 2017

Dzianis Zuev (born April 3, 1988) is a Belarusian welterweight kickboxer. A professional competitor since 2012, he is the 2014 Kunlun Fight welterweight tournament winner.

Zuev was ranked as a top ten lightweight by Combat Press between September and November 2017, as well as between July and November 2021.

== Kickboxing career ==
Zuev began boxing at the age of 16 and kickboxing at the age of 20. Sponsored by Kunlun Fight, Zuev relocated to China to donate boxing gloves and teach boxing to local disadvantaged children in hopes that they might improve their lives through boxing.

Zuev participated in the 2016 Kunlun Fight welterweight tournament, and was scheduled to face Jonay Risco in the Group A semifinal bout at Kunlun Fight 38 on February 21, 2016. He won the fight by unanimous decision, and would go on to beat Liu Lei in the same manner in the group finals. He would however lose to Davit Kiria in the quarterfinals of the tournament proper.

Zuev challenged Jonay Risco for the Enfusion welterweight title at Enfusion Live 40 on June 4, 2016. He lost the fight by unanimous decision.

Zuev took part in the 2017 Kunlun Fight welterweight tournament, and faced Liu Lei in the round of 16 bout at Kunlun Fight 60 on April 23, 2017. Zuev won the fight by a first-round technical knockout and was scheduled to fight Feng Xingli in the tournament quarterfinals at Kunlun Fight 65 on August 27, 2017. He won the fight by a second-round technical knockout. Zuev was set to fight Yohann Drai in the Kunlun Fight final four qualification bout, which was held at Kunlun Fight 67 on November 12, 2017. He won the fight by split decision. Zuev faced Marat Grigorian in the semifinals of the Kunlun Fight welterweight tournament, held at Kunlun Fight 69 on February 4, 2018. Grigorian won the fight by unanimous decision.

Zuev faced Vlad Tuinov in the quarterfinals of the Kunlun Fight welterweight tournament, which began at Kunlun Fight 77 on October 13, 2018. He won the fight by majority decision and was set to face Marouan Toutouh at Kunlun Fight 80 on February 24, 2019, in the tournament semifinals. Toutouh won the fight by unanimous decision.

Zuev was scheduled to face Jiao Fukai in the quarterfinals of the next Kunlun Fight tournament, which began at Kunlun Fight 81 on July 27, 2019. He lost the fight by majority decision.

Zuev was scheduled to face Nabil Igli at Kunlun Combat Professional League – Shenzhen vs. Shanghai – League Playoff Quarterfinal on November 17, 2019. He won the fight by a second-round technical knockout. Zuev was scheduled to face Zhao Junchen at Kunlun Fight 88 on December 25, 2019. He won the fight by decision.

Zuev was scheduled to face Dmitriy Filonchik in the quarterfinals of the BFC 72 kg tournament, held at BFC 56 on July 9, 2020. He knocked Filonchik down twice en route to a decision victory.

Zuev was scheduled to face Frederic Berichon at Nuit Des Champions 28 on November 20, 2021. Zuev was later forced to withdraw from the bout due to visa issues.

Replacing Amier Abdulahad on short notice on February 12, 2022, Zuev faced Stoyan Koprivlenski at Fair Fight XVI. He lost the fight via unanimous decision.

Zuev faced Jérémy Payet in the main event of Cicada Fight Championship on May 21, 2022. He won the fight by a third-round knockout.

== Titles ==
- Kunlun Fight
  - 2014 Kunlun Fight World Max Tournament Champion

== Professional kickboxing record ==
Professional Kickboxing Record
30 Wins, 15 Losses
Date	Result	Opponent	Event	Location	Method	Round	Time
2024-08-31	Loss	(China) Han Wenbao	Wu Lin Feng 547 – MAX Qualifying Tournament	Tangshan, China	Decision (Unanimous)	3	3:00
2024-06-15	Loss	(Thailand) Yodwicha Por Boonsit	EM Legend 46, Final	Chongqing, China	Decision (Unanimous)	3	3:00
2024-06-15	Win	(China) Huang Yuanzhe	EM Legend 46, Semifinals	Chongqing, China	Decision (Unanimous)	3	3:00
2022-06-25	Win	(France) Jérémy Payet	Kunlun Fight & Cicada Fight	Dubai, UAE	KO (Punches)	3	
2022-02-12	Loss	(Bulgaria) Stoyan Koprivlenski	Fair Fight XVI	Yekaterinburg, Russia	Decision (Unanimous)	3	3:00
2020-07-09	Win	(Belarus) Dmitriy Filonchik	BFC 56 – Tournament Quarterfinal	Minsk, Belarus	Decision	3	3:00
2019-12-25	Win	(China) Zhao Junchen	Kunlun Fight 88	Yiwu, China	Decision	3	3:00
2019-11-17	Win	(Morocco) Nabil Igli	Kunlun Combat Professional League – Shenzhen vs. Shanghai – League Playoff Quarterfinal	Tongling, China	TKO	2	2:38
2019-10-03	Win	(China) Ouyang Feng	Kunlun Fight 86	Tongliao, China	Decision (Unanimous)	3	3:00
2019-09-14	Win	(Russia) Artem Pashporin	Kunlun Fight 83	Guizhou, China	Decision (Split)	3	3:00
2019-07-27	Loss	(China) Jiao Fukai	Kunlun Fight 81, Tournament Quarterfinals	Beijing, China	Decision (Majority)	3	3:00
2019-02-24	Loss	(Morocco) Marouan Toutouh	Kunlun Fight 80, Tournament Semifinals	Shanghai, China	Decision (Unanimous)	3	3:00
2018-10-13	Win	(Russia) Vlad Tuinov	Kunlun Fight 77, Tournament Quarterfinals	Tongling, China	Decision (Majority)	3	3:00
2018-08-05	Win	(Australia) Victor Nagbe	Kunlun Fight 75	Sanya, China	Decision (Majority)	3	3:00
2018-06-01	Loss	(Thailand) Superbon Banchamek	Kunlun Fight Macao	Macau	Decision (Unanimous)	3	3:00
2018-04-01	Loss	(Thailand) Jomthong Chuwattana	Kunlun Fight 71	Qingdao, China	Decision (Split)	3	3:00
2018-02-04	Loss	(Armenia) Marat Grigorian	Kunlun Fight 69, Tournament Semi Finals	Guyang, China	Decision (Unanimous)	3	3:00
2017-11-12	Win	(France) Yohann Drai	Kunlun Fight 67 – World MAX 2017 Final 8	Sanya, China	Decision (Majority)	3	3:00
Qualified to Kunlun Fight 2017 70kg World Max Tournament Final 4.
2017-08-27	Win	(China) Feng Xingli	Kunlun Fight 65 70 kg World Max 2017 Tournament 1/8 Finals	Qingdao, China	TKO (Ref.stop/4 Knockdowns)	2	
Qualified to Kunlun Fight 2017 70kg World Max Tournament Final 8.
2017-06-10	Win	(Spain) Elam Chavez	Kunlun Fight 62	Bangkok, Thailand	Decision (Unanimous)	3	3:00
2017-04-23	Win	(China) Liu Lei	Kunlun Fight 60 70 kg World Max 2017 Group F Tournament Final	Zunyi, China	TKO (Ref.stop/3 Knockdowns)	1	2:18
Qualified to Kunlun Fight 2017 70kg World Max Tournament Final 16.
2017-04-23	Win	(Thailand) Arthit Hanchana	Kunlun Fight 60 70 kg World Max 2017 Group F Tournament Semi-finals	Zunyi, China	KO (Left Hook)	3	0:58
2017-01-01	Loss	(Morocco) Mohamed Mezouari	Kunlun Fight 56 70 kg 2016 Tournament Reserve Fight	Sanya, China	Decision (Unanimous)	3	3:00
2016-10-30	Win	(Russia) Dzhabar Askerov	Kunlun Fight 54	Hubei, China	Ex.R Decision (Unanimous)	4	3:00
2016-09-11	Loss	(Georgia (country)) Davit Kiria	Kunlun Fight 52 70 kg 2016 Tournament 1/8 Finals	Fuzhou, China	Decision (Unanimous)	3	3:00
2016-06-04	Loss	(Spain) Jonay Risco	Enfusion Live 40	Gran Canaria, Spain	Decision (Unanimous)	3	3:00
For the Enfusion Live World -70 kg title.
2016-02-21	Win	(China) Liu Lei	Kunlun Fight 38 70 kg World Max 2016 Group A Tournament Final	Pattaya, Thailand	Decision (Unanimous)	3	3:00
Qualified to Kunlun Fight 2016 70kg World Max Tournament Final 16.
2016-02-21	Win	(Spain) Jonay Risco	Kunlun Fight 38 70 kg World Max 2016 Group A Tournament Semi-finals	Pattaya, Thailand	Decision (Unanimous)	3	3:00
Record 14-3.
2016-01-09	Win	(Thailand) Armin Pumpanmuang Windy Sport	Kunlun Fight 36	Shanghai, China	Decision (Unanimous)	3	3:00
2015-10-28	Loss	(Australia) Victor Nagbe	Kunlun Fight 32 70 kg 2015 Tournament 1/8 Finals	Dazhou, China	Ex.R Decision (Unanimous)	4	3:00
2015-06-07	Loss	(Thailand) Yodsanklai Fairtex	Kunlun Fight 26	Chongqing, China	Decision (unanimous)	3	3:00
2015-04-26	Win	(Thailand) Nonsai Sor.Sanyakorn	Kunlun Fight 23	Changsha, China	TKO (Cut)	2	
2014-11-16	Win	(Australia) Victor Nagbe	Kunlun Fight 13 – 70 kg 2014 Tournament Final	Hohhot, China	Decision (Unanimous)	3	3:00
Wins the Kunlun Fight 2014 70 kg World Max Tournament World Championship.
2014-11-16	Win	(Thailand) Aikpracha Meenayothin	Kunlun Fight 13 – 70 kg 2014 Tournament Semifinals	Hohhot, China	KO (punch)	3	
2014-10-05	Loss	(Morocco) Mustapha Haida	Kunlun Fight 11 – 70 kg 2014 Tournament Quarter-finals	Macao, China	Decision (Unanimous)	3	3:00
Mustapha due to injury, Dzianis substitute competition. Qualified to Kunlun Fight 2014 70kg World Max Tournament Final 4.
2014-07-27	Win	(China) Feng Xingli	Kunlun Fight 7 – 70 kg 2014 Tournament 1/8 Finals	Zhoukou, China	Decision (Unanimous)	3	3:00
Qualified to Kunlun Fight 2014 70kg World Max Tournament Final 8.
2012-08-08	Loss	(Belarus) Farkhad Akhmedjanov	Knockout Show Mustang	Minsk, Belarus	Decision (Unanimous)	3	3:00
Legend: Win Loss Draw/No contest Notes

== See also ==
- List of male kickboxers
