= Bilal Bakhouche-Chareuf =

French muaythai kickboxer and mixed martial artist

- Born: March 22, 1995 (age 31); Strasbourg, France
- Height: 190 cm (6 ft 3 in)
- Weight: 81.4 kg (179 lb; 12.82 st)
- Style: Kickboxing, Muaythai
- Stance: Southpaw
- Fighting out of: Strasbourg, France
- Team: Apex Mixed Martial Arts; Wfight Strasbourg (Muay Thai/Kickboxing)
- Trainer: Mohd Zakaria
- Years active: 2015–present

Kickboxing record
- Total: 39
- Wins: 31
- By knockout: 10
- Losses: 6
- By knockout: 1
- Draws: 2

Mixed martial arts record
- Total: 4
- Wins: 4
- By knockout: 4
- Losses: 0

Bilal Bakhouche-Chareuf (born March 25, 1995) is a French Muay thai kickboxer and mixed martial artist.

As of May 2023, he was ranked as the sixth-best light heavyweight muay thai fighter in the world by Combat Press.

== Muay Thai and kickboxing career ==
Bilal Bakhouche-Chareuf made his professional debut against Harald Stritzl at Fight Night on February 28, 2015, with the WKU -75 kg title on the line. He captured his first piece of professional silverware by decision. Over the course of the next three years, Bakhouche-Chareuf likewise won the FFKMDA -76.2 kg and the AFMT -81 kg titles as well.

Bakhouche-Chareuf faced Lyra Chea for the AMFT -81 kg title at Championnat National AFMT on April 20, 2019. He won the fight by a first-round technical knockout. Bakhouche-Chareuf next faced Simon Hinkel for the FFKMDA -76.2 kg title at Capital Fights 4 on May 4, 2019. He won the fight by decision.

Bakhouche-Chareuf faced Alexandros Milos for the WBC Muaythai International Light Heavyweight (-79.4 kg) championship at En Route Vers la Gloire on June 18, 2021. He won the fight by a fifth-round knockout. In his next fight, Bakhouche-Chareuf faced Omar Moreno for the WMC European -82.5 kg title at EM Strasbourg Prestige on January 21, 2022. He won captured the title with a second round stoppage of the Spaniard.

Bakhouche-Chareuf faced Mohamed Touchassie at Enfusion 105 on March 26, 2022. He lost the fight by a second-round knockout. Bilal Bakhouche Chareuf was then booked to face Nikola Todorović at Senshi 12 on July 9, 2022. He lost the fight by unanimous decision, going on a two-fight losing skid for the first time in his professional career.

Bakhouche-Chareuf faced Mohammed Hajji Hamdi for the WAKO K-1 Light Cruiserweight (-85.1 kg) championship at Superstars Event on September 3, 2022. He won the fight by decision. Bakhouche-Chareuf faced Miguel Padilla for the WMC Intercontinental -81.4 kg Championship at Superstars Event II on February 4, 2023. He won the fight by a fourth-round knockout.

Bakhouche-Chareuf made his first WAKO-PRO World K-1 Light Cruiserweight title defense against Vladimir Idranyi at Yangames Fight Night on July 29, 2023. He retained the title by decision.

Bakhouche-Chareuf faced Ruben Garcia for the ISKA K-1 World Light Heavyweight (-81.5 kg) championship at Superstars Event III on September 2, 2023. He won the fight by decision.

Bakhouche-Chareuf made his second WAKO-PRO World K-1 Light Cruiserweight title defense against Renato Prenga at TKR 7 on December 9, 2023. He won the fight by unanimous decision.

Bakhouche-Chareuf faced Renato Prenga at Superstars Event 4 on April 12, 2024. He won the fight by unanimous decision.

Bakhouche-Chareuf challenged the WAKO-Pro K-1 World Light Heavyweight (-81.4 kg) champion Sergej Braun at Battle of Barock III on May 25, 2024. He lost the fight by unanimous decision.

Bakhouche-Chareuf faced Aaron Ortiz for the vacant WMC World Super Light-heavyweight (-81 kg) title at Superstars Event 7 on April 4, 2025. He captured the title by unanimous decision.

== Championships and accomplishments ==
=== Professional ===
==== Muay Thai ====
- Fédération Française de Kickboxing, Muaythai et Disciplines Associées
  - 2018 FFKMDA France National -76.2 kg Champion
  - 2019 FFKMDA France National -76.2 kg Champion
- Académie Française de Muay Thaï
  - 2018 AFMT -81 kg Championship
  - 2019 AFMT -81 kg Championship
- World Boxing Council Muaythai
  - 2021 WBC Muaythai International Light Heavyweight (-79.4 kg) Championship
- World Muaythai Council
  - 2021 WMC European -82.5 kg Championship
  - 2023 WMC Intercontinental -81.4 kg Championship
  - 2025 WMC World Super Light-heavyweight (-81 kg) Championship

==== Kickboxing ====
- World Kickboxing Union
  - 2015 WKU K-1 -75 kg Championship
- World Association of Kickboxing Organizations
  - 2022 WAKO-Pro K-1 World Light Cruiserweight (-85.1 kg) Championship
    - Two successful title defenses
- International Sport Kickboxing Association
  - 2023 ISKA K-1 World Light Heavyweight (-81.5 kg) Championship
- World Kickboxing Network
  - 2026 WKN K-1 World Light Heavyweight (-82.5 kg) Championship

=== Amateur ===
- International Federation of Muaythai Associations
  - 2017 IFMA European Championship B-class -81 kg (bronze)
  - 2018 FISU World University Championship -81 kg (bronze)
  - 2019 IFMA European Championship -81 kg (bronze)
  - 2023 IFMA World Championship -81 kg (bronze)
  - 2026 IFMA World Championship SB -86 kg (gold)

== Mixed martial arts record ==
Professional record breakdown
4 matches	4 wins	0 losses
By knockout	4	0
By submission	0	0
By decision	0	0

Res.	Record	Opponent	Method	Event	Date	Round	Time	Location	Notes
		Alexis Nicolas		Ares FC 46	12 December 2026			Paris, France	
Win	4–0	Daniel Rodrigues	TKO (head kick and punches)	Ares FC 44	October 31, 2026	1	3:20	Eckbolsheim, France	
Win	3–0	Feng Rui	TKO (punches)	JCK Kings 015	August 8, 2026	1	4:20	Lüliang, China	Middleweight debut.
Win	2–0	Mohamed Pardevan	TKO (punches)	Africa Fight League 1	June 13, 2026	1	2:28	Conakry, Guinea	Catchweight (81kg).
Win	1–0	Tomy Blanco	KO (left hook)	Ares FC 35	October 18, 2025	1	0:22	Eckbolsheim, France	Welterweight debut.

== Muay Thai and kickboxing record ==
Professional Muay Thai and kickboxing record
31 wins (10 (T)KOs), 6 losses, 2 draws
Date	Result	Opponent	Event	Location	Method	Round	Time
2026-07-05	Win	(France) Mathieu Ceva	Superstars Event 9	Strasbourg, France	KO	2	
Wins the vacant WKN K-1 World Light Heavyweight (-82.5kg) title.
2025-05-24	Win	(Switzerland) Eric Britto	Siam Fight 9	Terville, France	Decision (unanimous)	3	3:00
2025-04-04	Win	(United States) Aaron Ortiz	Superstars Event 7	Strasbourg, France	Decision (unanimous)	5	3:00
Wins the vacant WMC World Super Light-heavyweight (-81kg) title.
2024-05-25	Loss	(Germany) Sergej Braun	Battle of Barock III	Fulda, Germany	Decision (unanimous)	5	3:00
For the WAKO-Pro K-1 World Light Heavyweight (-81.4 kg) title.
2024-04-12	Win	(Italy) Renato Prenga	Superstars Event 4	Mundolsheim, France	Decision (unanimous)	3	3:00
2023-12-09	Win	(Spain) Alberto Mendez	TKR 7	Bezons, France	Decision (unanimous)	5	3:00
Defends the WAKO-PRO World K-1 Light Cruiserweight (-85.1 kg) Championship.
2023-09-02	Win	(Spain) Ruben Gonzalez	Superstars Event III	Strasbourg, France	Decision (unanimous)	5	3:00
Wins the ISKA K-1 World Light Heavyweight (-81.5 kg) Championship.
2023-07-29	Win	(Czech Republic) Vladimir Idranyi	Yangames Fight Night	Prague, Czech Republic	Decision (split)	5	3:00
Defends the WAKO-PRO World K-1 Light Cruiserweight (-85.1 kg) Championship.
2023-02-04	Win	(Mexico) Miguel Padilla	Superstars Event II	Ostwald, France	KO (elbow)	4	1:11
Wins the WMC Intercontinental -81.4 kg Championship.
2022-11-12	Win	(France) Ramzi Nouainia	Sanam Muay	Montbéliard, France	Decision	5	3:00
2022-10-15	Draw	(Cameroon) Loic Njeya	One Team Championship	Reutlingen, Germany	Decision	3	3:00
2022-09-03	Win	(Spain) Mohammed Hamdi	Superstars Event	Strasbourg, France	Decision (unanimous)	5	3:00
Wins the WAKO-Pro K-1 World Light Cruiserweight (-85.1 kg) Championship.
2022-07-09	Loss	(Serbia) Nikola Todorović	Senshi 12	Varna, Bulgaria	Decision (unanimous)	3	3:00
2022-03-26	Loss	(Morocco) Mohamed Touchassie	Enfusion 105	Alkmaar, Netherlands	TKO (punches to the body)	2	0:51
2022-01-21	Win	(Spain) Omar Moreno	EM Strasbourg Prestige	Strasbourg, France	TKO (punches)	2	2:25
Wins the WMC European -82.5 kg Championship.
2021-06-18	Win	(Greece) Alexandros Milos	En Route Vers la Gloire	Abidjan, Côte d'Ivoire	TKO (cut)	5	0:34
Wins the WBC Muaythai International Light Heavyweight (-79.4 kg) Championship.
2020-08-22	Win	(France) Thibault Gervais	Fight Time	Recherswil, Switzerland	TKO (doctor stoppage)	2	
2019-12-21	Win	(Spain) Maximo Suarez	TKR, Tournament Finals	Bezons, France	Decision	3	3:00
Wins the TKR K-1 Welterweight (-77 kg) Tournament Championship.
2019-12-21	Win	(France) Lassana Coulibaly	TKR, Tournament Semifinals	Bezons, France	Decision	3	3:00
2019-11-30	Win	(Belgium) Mbamba Cauwenbergh	Ultimate Muaythai K1 Rules	Strasbourg, France	Decision	3	3:00
2019-09-28	Draw	(France) Benoit Pilgram	La Nuit Des Guerriers 2019	Bitche, France	Decision	3	3:00
2019-06-11	Loss	(Uzbekistan) Sher Mamazulunov	Tatneft Cup, -80 kg 1/8 Final	Kazan, Russia	Ext. R. decision	4	3:00
2019-05-18	Win	(Germany) Simon Hinkel	Champions Fight Night	Freiburg im Breisgau, Germany	Decision	5	3:00
2019-05-04	Win	(France) Aboubacar Deme	Capital Fights 4	Paris, France	Decision	5	3:00
Wins the FFKMDA -76.2 kg Championship.
2019-04-20	Win	(France) Lyra Chea	Championnat National AFMT	Paris, France	TKO (referee stoppage)	1	
Wins the AFMT -81 kg Championship.
2019-03-30	Win	(France) Ramzi Nouainia	Sewakhaw Muay Thaï Fight	La Chapelle-Achard, France	Decision	5	3:00
2019-03-16	Win	(France) Nicolas Lauret	1/2 Finales Championnat de France Pro de Muay Thai	Bondy, France	TKO (retirement)	1	3:00
2018-12-01	Win	(France) Micael Longin	Championnat d'Europe WKN K-1 Rules	Strasbourg, France	TKO (referee stoppage)	2	
2018-10-21	Win	(France) Mickael Benatar	Muay Thai Grand Prix	Paris, France	Decision	3	3:00
2018-06-17	Win	(Hungary) Viktor Varjasi	Muay Thai Show	Strasbourg, France	KO	3	
2018-06-02	Win	(France) Jeremy Poicuitte	Hurricane Fighting 5	Châlons-en-Champagne, France	Decision	5	3:00
2018-04-14	Win	(France) François Aubertelle	Radikal Fight Night Silver	Charleville-Mézières, France	TKO	4	
Wins the AFMT -81 kg Championship.
2018-04-07	Win	(France) Randall Valentine	Finales Championnat De France Pro, Tournament Final	Saint-Ouen-sur-Seine, France	Decision	5	3:00
Wins the FFKMDA -76.2 kg Championship.
2017-07-01	Win	(Switzerland) Manuel Rifa	Fight Time	Recherswil, Switzerland	Decision	5	3:00
2017-03-03	Loss	(Thailand) Panom Topkingboxing	Muay Xtreme	Bangkok, Thailand	Decision	5	3:00
2017-02-18	Win	(France) Arbi Zaipoulaiev	Quarts De Finale Muaythai Pro, Tournament Quarterfinals	Aulnay-sous-Bois, France	Decision	5	3:00
2016-11-26	Loss	(France) Samuel Andoche	BLR Fight 3	Saint-Denis, Réunion	Decision	5	3:00
2016-02-27	Win	(France) Zakaria Khelil	Road To Bangkok IV	Cernier, Switzerland	Decision	5	3:00
2015-02-28	Win	(Austria) Harald Stritzl	Fight Night	Amstetten, Austria	Decision	3	3:00
Wins the WKU -75 kg Championship.
Legend: Win Loss Draw/no contest Notes

Amateur fight record
Date	Result	Opponent	Event	Location	Method	Round	Time
2026-09-08	Win	(Albania) Ermil Xhaferi	IFMA 2026 World Championships, Final	Deçan, Kosovo	TKO	2	
Wins the 2026 IFMA World Championship SB -86kg Gold Medal.
2024-06-05	Loss	(Iraq) Mustafa Al Tekreeti	IFMA 2024 World Championships, Tournament Quarterfinals	Patras, Greece	Decision (29:28)	3	3:00
2024-06-03	Win	(Greece) Kleanthis Kiriakou	IFMA 2024 World Championships, Tournament First Round	Patras, Greece	Decision (30:27)	3	3:00
2023-06-25	Loss	(Moldova) Artiom Livadari	2023 European Games, Tournament Quarterfinals	Kraków, Poland	Decision (30:27)	3	3:00
2023-05-10	Loss	(Iraq) Mustafa Al Tekreeti	IFMA 2023 World Championships, Tournament Semifinals	Bangkok, Thailand	Decision (30:27)	3	3:00
Wins the 2023 IFMA World Championship -81kg Bronze Medal.
2023-05-08	Win	(Russia) Daniil Chashin	IFMA 2023 World Championships, Tournament Quarterfinals	Bangkok, Thailand	Decision (29:28)	3	3:00
2023-05-06	Win	(Turkey) Enis Yunusoglu	IFMA 2023 World Championships, Tournament First Round	Bangkok, Thailand	Decision (29:28)	3	3:00
2021-12-06	Loss	(Ukraine) Vasyl Sorokin	IFMA 2021 World Championship, Tournament First Round	Bangkok, Thailand	Decision (30:27)	3	3:00
2019-11-	Loss	(Belarus) Mikita Shostak	IFMA 2019 European Championships, Tournament Semifinals	Minsk, Belarus	Decision (30:27)	3	3:00
Wins the 2019 IFMA European Championship -81kg Bronze Medal.
2017-10-18	Loss	(Belarus) Karen Tumasian	IFMA 2017 European Championships, Tournament Semifinals	Paris, France	TKO (injury)	1	
Wins the 2017 IFMA European Championship B-class -81kg Bronze Medal.
2015-08-	Loss	(Australia) Sebastian Holmez	IFMA Royal World Cup 2015, Tournament First Round	Bangkok, Thailand	Decision	3	3:00
2014-05-	Loss	(Canada) Jacob Mckenzie	2014 IFMA World Championship, Quarterfinals	Langkawi, Malaysia			
2014-05-	Win	(United States) Kenneth Mongonia	2014 IFMA World Championship, Second round	Langkawi, Malaysia			
2014-05-	Win	(England) Jake Purdy	2014 IFMA World Championship, First round	Langkawi, Malaysia			
2014-04-30	Win	(France) Julien Gobillot	FMDA Championships, Tournament Finals	Paris, France	Decision (unanimous)	4	3:00
Wins the FMDA B-Class -75 kg Championship.
2014-04-30	Win	(France) Giovanni Foconnier	FMDA Championships, Tournament Semifinals	Paris, France	Decision (unanimous)	4	3:00
Legend: Win Loss Draw/no contest Notes

== See also ==
- List of male kickboxers
