= Nikola Todorović =

Serbian kickboxer

- Born: June 17, 1998 (age 28); Novi Sad, Serbia
- Height: 190 cm (6 ft 3 in)
- Weight: 77 kg (170 lb; 12.1 st)
- Division: Welterweight
- Style: Kickboxing
- Stance: Orthodox
- Fighting out of: Novi Sad, Serbia
- Team: Warrior Gym Serbia
- Years active: 2014–present

Kickboxing record
- Total: 34
- Wins: 27
- By knockout: 15
- Losses: 7
- By knockout: 0

Mixed martial arts record
- Total: 3
- Wins: 3
- By knockout: 2
- By submission: 1
- Losses: 0

Nikola Todorović (born June 17, 1998) is a Serbian kickboxer, currently competing in the welterweight division of Glory. He is the reigning WAKO-Pro World K-1 Super Middleweight (-78.1 kg) champion.

== Professional kickboxing career ==
=== Early career ===
Todorović faced Zakaria Laaouatni for the vacant WAKO-Pro World K-1 Super Middleweight (-78.1 kg) title at TEK Fight on July 10, 2021. He captured the vacant championship with a first-round stoppage of Laaouatni.

Todorović faced Sergej Braun at Senshi 11 on February 26, 2021. They were initially expected to fight at SENSHI 10 on December 3, 2021, but Todorović was forced to withdraw after testing positive for COVID-19. He lost the fight by unanimous decision.

On November 1, 2021, Todorović faced Vedat Hödük at Superkombat Universe for the inaugural Superkombat 77 kg World title. He lost the fight by split decision.

Todorović faced Bilal Bakhouche-Chareuf at Senshi 12 on July 9, 2022. He won the fight by unanimous decision. Todorović faced Maikel Astur in his third SENSHI appearance at Senshi 13 on September 10, 2022. He won the fight by unanimous decision.

Todorović faced Marouan Toutouh at Senshi 15 on February 18, 2023. After appearing to lose the opening round, Todorović stopped his opponent with a knee at the 2:44 minute mark of the following round. Todorović next faced Rodrigo Mineiro at SENSHI 16 on May 13, 2023. He won the fight by a second-round technical knockout. Mineiro injured his shin on a checked leg kick and was unable to continue competing.

=== GLORY ===
Todorović made his GLORY debut against Karim Ghajji at Glory 88 on September 9, 2023. He won the fight by unanimous decision.

Todorović faced Edon Agushi at Senshi 20 on February 24, 2024. He won the fight by a third-round knockout.

Todorović faced Kevin Latchimy at Senshi 21 on April 20, 2024. Latchimy later withdrew and was replaced by Cristin Musteață. Todorović won the fight by a third-round technical knockout.

Todorović faced Robin Ciric at Glory 93 on July 20, 2024. He lost the fight by unanimous decision.

Todorović faced Ilyass Chakir at SENSHI 25 on February 22, 2025. He won the fight by unanimous decision.

Todorović returned to Glory at Glory 109 on September 5, 2026. He faced Vedat Hödük, winning via unanimous decision

== Mixed martial arts career ==
Todorović made his Mixed Martial Arts debut at ARMMADA 15 on September 27, 2025. He faced Joseph Hapgood, winning the bout via TKO in the first round.

Todorović faced Constantin Cretu at Brave CF 104 on February 14, 2026. He won the fight by first round Submission.

Todorović faced Hristian Yamboliev at ARMMADA 18, on June 6, 2026. He won the bout via TKO in the first round.

== Championships and accomplishments ==
=== Amateur ===
- World Association of Kickboxing Organizations
  - 2015 WAKO Junior European Championships K-1 (-75 kg) (bronze)
  - 2016 WAKO Junior World Championships K-1 (-75 kg) (gold)
  - 2018 WAKO European Championships K-1 (-75 kg) (bronze)
  - 2019 WAKO World Championships K-1 (-75 kg) (silver)
  - 2021 WAKO World Championships K-1 (-81 kg) (bronze)
  - 2022 WAKO European Championships K-1 (-81 kg) (bronze)
  - 2023 WAKO World Championships K-1 (-81 kg) (gold)
  - 2024 WAKO European Championships K-1 (-81 kg) (gold)
  - 2025 WAKO World Championships K-1 (-81 kg) (gold)
- European University Sports Association
  - 2019 European Universities Combat Championships K-1 (-75 kg) (silver)
- Serbian Kickboxing Federation
  - 2014 Vojvodina Championships Low Kick (-71 kg) (gold)
  - 2015 Balkan Open K-1 (-71 kg) (gold)
  - 2022 Balkan Open K-1 (-81 kg) (gold)

=== Professional ===
- World Association of Kickboxing Organizations
  - 2018 WAKO-Pro Serbia K-1 Middleweight (-75 kg) Championship
  - 2021 WAKO-Pro World K-1 Super Middleweight (-78.1 kg) Championship
    - One successful title defense

== Mixed martial arts record ==
Professional record breakdown
| 3 matches | 3 wins | 0 losses |
| By knockout | 2 | 0 |
| By submission | 1 | 0 |

| Res. | Record | Opponent | Method | Event | Date | Round | Time | Location | Notes |
|---|---|---|---|---|---|---|---|---|---|
| Win | 3–0 | Hristian Yamboliev | KO (punches) | ARMMADA 18 | June 6, 2026 | 1 | 0:35 | Sombor, Serbia | |
| Win | 2–0 | Constantin Cretu | Submission (guillotine choke) | Brave CF 104 | February 14, 2026 | 1 | 1:18 | Belgrade, Serbia | |
| Win | 1–0 | Joseph Hapgood | KO (punches) | ARMMADA 15 | September 27, 2025 | 1 | 0:25 | Bor, Serbia | Welterweight debut. |

== Kickboxing record ==
Kickboxing record
27 Wins (15 (T)KO's), 7 Losses, 0 Draw, 0 No Contests
| Date | Result | Opponent | Event | Location | Method | Round | Time |
| 2026-12-12 | | (Morocco) Hamicha | Glory Collision 10 - Welterweight Grand Prix, reserve | Arnhem, Netherlands | | | |
| 2026-09-05 | Win | (Turkey) Vedat Hödük | Glory 109 | Rotterdam, Netherlands | Decision (Unanimous) | 3 | 3:00 |
| 2025-02-22 | Win | (Morocco) Ilyass Chakir | SENSHI 25 | Varna, Bulgaria | Decision (Unanimous) | 3 | 3:00 |
| 2024-12-14 | Win | (Spain) Jordi Requejo | UAM K-1 Pro Night | Abu Dhabi, UAE | TKO (retirement/arm injury) | 2 | |
Defends the WAKO-Pro World K-1 Super Middleweight (-78.1 kg) title.
| 2024-07-20 | Loss | (Netherlands) Robin Ciric | Glory 93 | Rotterdam, Netherlands | Decision (Unanimous) | 3 | 3:00 |
| 2024-04-20 | Win | (Moldova) Cristin Musteață | Senshi 21 | Varna, Bulgaria | TKO (Referee stoppage) | 3 | 1:40 |
| 2024-02-24 | Win | (Kosovo) Edon Agushi | Senshi 20 | Varna, Bulgaria | KO (Knee to the head) | 3 | 0:30 |
| 2023-09-09 | Win | (France) Karim Ghajji | Glory 88 | Paris, France | Decision (Unanimous) | 3 | 3:00 |
| 2023-05-13 | Win | (Brazil) Rodrigo Mineiro | Senshi 16 | Varna, Bulgaria | TKO (Injury) | 2 | |
| 2023-02-18 | Win | (Morocco) Marouan Toutouh | Senshi 15 | Varna, Bulgaria | KO (Knee to the head) | 2 | 2:44 |
| 2022-09-10 | Win | (Estonia) Maikel Astur | Senshi 13 | Varna, Bulgaria | Decision (Unanimous) | 3 | 3:00 |
| 2022-07-09 | Win | (France) Bilal Bakhouche-Chareuf | Senshi 12 | Varna, Bulgaria | Decision (Unanimous) | 3 | 3:00 |
| 2022-02-26 | Loss | (Germany) Sergej Braun | Senshi 11 | Varna, Bulgaria | Decision (Unanimous) | 3 | 3:00 |
| 2021-11-01 | Loss | (Turkey) Vedat Hödük | SuperKombat Universe | Dubai, United Arab Emirates | Decision (Split) | 3 | 3:00 |
For the inaugural Superkombat World Super Middleweight (-77 kg) title.
| 2021-07-10 | Win | (France) Zakaria Laaouatni | TEK Fight | Meaux, France | TKO (Referee stoppage) | 1 | |
Won the vacant WAKO-Pro World K-1 Super Middleweight (-78.1 kg) title.
| 2021-06-11 | Win | (Slovenia) Žiga Pecnik | Road to ONE: Arena Friday Night Fights 2 | Belgrade, Serbia | KO (Body punch) | 1 | 1:24 |
| 2021-03-05 | Win | (North Macedonia) Boban Ilioski | Arena Friday Night Fights 3 | Belgrade, Serbia | Decision (Unanimous) | 3 | 3:00 |
| 2020-08-21 | Win | (Bulgaria) Eduard Aleksanyan | Senshi 6 | Varna, Bulgaria | Decision (Unanimous) | 3 | 3:00 |
| 2020-03-07 | Win | (Hungary) Patrik Vidákovics | Vikker Dániel Emlékverseny VI - Endgame | Szeged, Hungary | Decision (Unanimous) | 3 | 3:00 |
| 2019-11-16 | Win | (Afghanistan) Hamid Rezaie | Enfusion Talents 77 | Groningen, Netherlands | Decision (Unanimous) | 3 | 3:00 |
| 2019-06-13 | Loss | (Romania) Daniel Pattvean | SAS Gym 02 | Bucharest, Romania | Decision (Unanimous) | 3 | 3:00 |
| 2019-03-15 | Win | (Serbia) Nikola Drobnjak | Megdan 4 | Novi Sad, Serbia | TKO (Retirement) | 2 | 3:00 |
| 2019-02-23 | Loss | (Bulgaria) Hristiyan Korunchev | Senshi 1 | Varna, Bulgaria | Decision (Unanimous) | 5 | 3:00 |
For the WAKO-Pro Intercontinental K-1 Super Middleweight (-78.1 kg) title.
| 2018-12-21 | Win | (Serbia) Miloš Daković | Zlatni Kik Bokser | Smederevo, Serbia | KO (Head kick) | 1 | 1:10 |
Won the WAKO-Pro Serbia K-1 Middleweight (-75 kg) title.
| 2018-10-27 | Win | (Albania) Kadri Murseli | Fight Legend Geneva | Geneva, Switzerland | KO | 1 | |
| 2018-05-17 | Win | (Austria) Markus Ehrenhofer | Tosan Fight Night | Vienna, Austria | KO (Right straight) | 3 | |
| 2018-04-26 | Win | (Russia) Surik Magakyan | Megdan 3 | Novi Sad, Serbia | Decision (Unanimous) | 3 | 3:00 |
| 2017-11-25 | Win | (Croatia) Ivan Novosel | Megdan 2 | Novi Sad, Serbia | KO (Liver shot) | 1 | 0:40 |
| 2017-09-15 | Win | (Croatia) Ivan Bilić | | Croatia | TKO (Arm injury) | 2 | 3:00 |
| 2017-07-30 | Loss | (Croatia) Ivan Bilić | Opatija Fight Night 7 | Pula, Croatia | Decision | 3 | 3:00 |
| 2017-05-29 | Win | (Romania) Costan Bogdan | Viva K1 Fight 2017 | Vršac, Serbia | KO | 2 | |
| 2017-04-22 | Win | (Bulgaria) Božidar Georgiev | Megdan 1 | Novi Sad, Serbia | KO (Left hook) | 2 | 1:34 |
| 2016-12-04 | Win | (Serbia) Stefan Markanovič | Do Pobede 5 | Novi Sad, Serbia | Decision (Unanimous) | 3 | 3:00 |
| 2016-10-29 | Loss | (Slovakia) Juraj Tutura | Hanuman Cup | Bratislava, Slovakia | Decision (Unanimous) | 3 | 3:00 |
| 2015-12-06 | Win | (Serbia) Filip Baca | Do Pobede 4 | Novi Sad, Serbia | Decision (Unanimous) | 3 | 3:00 |
Legend: Win Loss Draw/No contest Notes

Amateur Kickboxing Record
| Date | Result | Opponent | Event | Location | Method | Round | Time |
|---|---|---|---|---|---|---|---|
| 2025-11-29 | Win | (Egypt) Shahoz Ali | 2025 WAKO World Championship, Final | Abu Dhabi, UAE | Decision (3:0) | 3 | 2:00 |
Won the 2025 WAKO World Championships K-1 -81 kg Gold Medal.
| 2025-11-28 | Win | (Turkey) Halil Birlik | 2025 WAKO World Championship, Semifinals | Abu Dhabi, UAE | Decision (3:0) | 3 | 2:00 |
| 2025-11-27 | Win | (Azerbaijan) Alim Nabiev | 2025 WAKO World Championship, Quarterfinals | Abu Dhabi, UAE | Decision (3:0) | 3 | 2:00 |
| 2025-11-25 | Win | (Norway) Rares-Stefan Ene | 2025 WAKO World Championship, Second Round | Abu Dhabi, UAE | Walkover | | |
| 2024-11-10 | Win | (Bulgaria) Ali Yuzeir | 2024 WAKO European Championships, Tournament Final | Athens, Greece | Decision (3:0) | 3 | 2:00 |
Won the 2024 WAKO European Championships K-1 -81 kg Gold Medal.
| 2024-11-09 | Win | (Montenegro) Lazar Klikovac | 2024 WAKO European Championships, Tournament Semifinal | Athens, Greece | Decision (3:0) | 3 | 2:00 |
| 2024-11-08 | Win | (France) Valentin Hammani | 2024 WAKO European Championships, Tournament Quarterfinal | Athens, Greece | Decision (3:0) | 3 | 2:00 |
| 2023-11-24 | Win | (Poland) Bartosz Dolbien | 2023 WAKO World Championships, Tournament Final | Albufeira, Portugal | Decision (3:0) | 3 | 2:00 |
Won the 2023 WAKO World Championships K-1 -81 kg Gold Medal.
| 2023-11-22 | Win | (Kazakhstan) Ruslan Stepanov | 2023 WAKO World Championships, Tournament Semifinal | Albufeira, Portugal | Decision (3:0) | 3 | 2:00 |
| 2023-11-20 | Win | (Republic of Ireland) Damian Darker | 2023 WAKO World Championships, Tournament Quarterfinal | Albufeira, Portugal | Decision (3:0) | 3 | 2:00 |
| 2023-11-18 | Win | (Croatia) Raul Sunara | 2023 WAKO World Championships, Tournament Opening Round | Albufeira, Portugal | Decision (3:0) | 3 | 2:00 |
| 2022-11-18 | Loss | (Poland) Bartosz Dolbien | 2022 WAKO European Championships, Tournament Semifinal | Antalya, Turkey | Decision (3:0) | 3 | 2:00 |
Won the 2022 WAKO European Championships K-1 -81 kg Bronze Medal.
| 2022-11-16 | Win | (Bosnia and Herzegovina) Sanjin Alihodžić | 2022 WAKO European Championships, Tournament Quarterfinal | Antalya, Turkey | Decision (3:0) | 3 | 2:00 |
| 2022-03-20 | Win | (Israel) Yair Menachem | 2022 Serbia Open, Tournament Final | Kraljevo, Serbia | Decision (3:0) | 3 | 2:00 |
Won the 2022 Serbia Open K-1 -81 kg Gold Medal.
| 2022-03-19 | Win | (Slovakia) Erik Munka | 2022 Serbia Open, Tournament Semifinal | Kraljevo, Serbia | Decision (3:0) | 3 | 2:00 |
| 2021-10-22 | Loss | (Russia) Aleksandr Dmitrenko | 2021 WAKO World Championships, Tournament Semifinal | Lido di Jesolo, Italy | Decision (3:0) | 3 | 2:00 |
Won the 2021 WAKO World Championships K-1 -81 kg Bronze Medal.
| 2021-10-20 | Win | (Estonia) Maikel Astur | 2021 WAKO World Championships, Tournament Quarterfinal | Lido di Jesolo, Italy | Decision (2:1) | 3 | 2:00 |
| 2021-10-18 | Win | (Ukraine) Vladyslav Tiurmenko | 2021 WAKO World Championships, Tournament Second Round | Lido di Jesolo, Italy | Decision (3:0) | 3 | 2:00 |
| 2021-10-16 | Win | (Armenia) Anatoli Hunanyan | 2021 WAKO World Championships, Tournament First Round | Lido di Jesolo, Italy | Decision (3:0) | 3 | 2:00 |
| 2019-10-27 | Loss | (Russia) Vlad Tuinov | 2019 WAKO World Championships, Tournament Final | Sarajevo, Bosnia and Herzegovina | Decision (3:0) | 3 | 2:00 |
Won the 2019 WAKO World Championships K-1 -75 kg Silver Medal.
| 2019-10-25 | Win | (Estonia) Maikel Astur | 2019 WAKO World Championships, Tournament Semifinal | Sarajevo, Bosnia and Herzegovina | Decision (3:0) | 3 | 2:00 |
| 2019-10-24 | Win | (Kazakhstan) Altynbek Zhunussov | 2019 WAKO World Championships, Tournament Quarterfinal | Sarajevo, Bosnia and Herzegovina | Decision (3:0) | 3 | 2:00 |
| 2019-10-23 | Win | (Poland) Michal Burdan | 2019 WAKO World Championships, Tournament Second Round | Sarajevo, Bosnia and Herzegovina | Decision (3:0) | 3 | 2:00 |
| 2019-10-22 | Win | (Croatia) Antonio Krajinović | 2019 WAKO World Championships, Tournament First Round | Sarajevo, Bosnia and Herzegovina | Decision (3:0) | 3 | 2:00 |
| 2019-08-03 | Win | (Ukraine) Vladyslav Tiurmenko | 2019 European Universities Combat Championships, Tournament Final | Zagreb, Croatia | Decision (3:0) | 3 | 2:00 |
Won the 2019 European Universities Combat Championships K-1 -75 kg Silver Medal.
| 2019-08-02 | Win | (Poland) Tomasz Przybylski | 2019 European Universities Combat Championships, Tournament Semifinal | Zagreb, Croatia | Decision (3:0) | 3 | 2:00 |
| 2019-08-01 | Win | (Russia) Mukhamat Khochuev | 2019 European Universities Combat Championships, Tournament Quarterfinal | Zagreb, Croatia | Decision (3:0) | 3 | 2:00 |
| 2018-10-19 | Loss | (Belarus) Maks Spadarenka | 2018 WAKO European Championships, Tournament Semifinal | Bratislava, Slovakia | Decision (3:0) | 3 | 2:00 |
Won the 2018 WAKO European Championships (-75 kg) K-1 Bronze Medal.
| 2018-10-17 | Win | (Ukraine) Andrii Syrotenko | 2018 WAKO European Championships, Tournament Quarterfinal | Bratislava, Slovakia | Decision (3:0) | 3 | 2:00 |
| 2017-05-18 | Loss | (Poland) Kamil Sójkowski | 23rd Hungarian Kickboxing World Cup, Tournament Quarterfinal | Budapest, Hungary | Decision (3:0) | 3 | 2:00 |
| 2016-09-03 | Win | (Poland) Damian Piskorz | 2016 WAKO Junior World Championships, Tournament Final | Dublin, Ireland | Decision (3:0) | 3 | 2:00 |
Won the 2016 WAKO Junior World Championships (-75 kg) K-1 Gold Medal.
| 2015-06-13 | Win | (Croatia) Mateo Čirić | 2015 Balkan Open, Tournament Final | Tešanj, Bosnia and Herzegovina | Decision (3:0) | 3 | 2:00 |
Won the 2015 Balkan Open (-71 kg) K-1 Gold Medal.
| 2015-06-13 | Win | (Serbia) Velid Blažević | 2015 Balkan Open, Tournament Semifinal | Tešanj, Bosnia and Herzegovina | Decision (3:0) | 3 | 2:00 |
| 2014-12-13 | Win | (Serbia) Vukašin Stupar | 2014 Vojvodina Championships, Tournament Final | Tešanj, Bosnia and Herzegovina | Decision (3:0) | 3 | 1:30 |
Won the 2014 Vojvodina Championships Low Kick (-71 kg) Gold Medal.
| 2014-12-13 | Win | (Serbia) Stefan Markanović | 2014 Vojvodina Championships, Tournament Semifinal | Tešanj, Bosnia and Herzegovina | Decision (3:0) | 3 | 1:30 |
Legend: Win Loss Draw/No contest Notes

== See also ==
- List of male kickboxers
