= Mohamed Mezouari =

Moroccan athlete

- Born: Mohamed Mezouari; January 6, 1996 (age 30); Amsterdam, Netherlands
- Other names: Wonderboy
- Height: 188 cm (6 ft 2 in)
- Weight: 77 kg (170 lb; 12.1 st)
- Division: Welterweight
- Fighting out of: Amsterdam, Netherlands
- Team: Elite Training Center

Kickboxing record
- Total: 45
- Wins: 43
- By knockout: 31
- Losses: 2
- By knockout: 0
- Draws: 0

Mohamed Mezouari, better known as Hamicha, is a Moroccan-Dutch kickboxer.

In November 2026, he ranked sixth best welterweight kickboxer in the world by Combat Press

== Kickboxing career ==
=== Early career ===
Mezouari started to train kickboxing at the age of 8 on El Otmani Gym in the Netherlands, where he still training.

Mezouari fought Dzianis Zuev in the Kunlun 56 70 kg tournament reserve fight. He won the fight by unanimous decision.

Mezouari fought in the Kunlun Fight Group 1 70 kg tournament. In the semifinals, he won a decision against Arman Hambaryan. In the group tournament finals, Mezouari defeated Danilo Zanolini through a first-round KO.

Mezouari fought Thongchai Sitsongpeenong during Fight League 7 for the Fight League -76 kg World title. Mezouari knocked Thongchai out in the second round, with a right low kick.

Afterwards, Mezouari fought Artem Pashporin. Mezouari won the fight by a first-round TKO, which earned him a place in the 2017 70 kg World Max Tournament Final 8. Mezouari lost a unanimous decision to Marat Grigorian in the quarterfinals.

=== Glory ===
Mezouari made his Glory debut during Glory 62, when he faced Miles Simson. He knocked Simson out in the first round. He won his second fight against Adam Hadfield at Glory 66: Paris on June 22, 2019, by a first-round technical knockout.

Mezouari was expected to face Dmitry Menshikov at Glory 78: Rotterdam. Menshikov later withdrew from the bout and was replaced by Vedat Hödük. Mezouari won the fight by a first-round technical knockout.

Mezouari was expected to face Eyevan Danenberg at Glory: Collision 3 on October 23, 2021. Danenberg later withdrew from the bout and was replaced by Maximo Suarez. Suarez later withdrew a from the bout as well, and was replaced by Samo Dbili. Mezouari won the fight by a first-round technical knockout.

Mezouari was expected to face Sofiane Gelin in a middleweight bout at Glory 86 on May 27, 2023. He withdrew from the fight on May 13, for undisclosed reasons.

Mezouari faced Cédric Do at Glory 95 on September 21, 2024.

== Titles and accomplishments ==
- Fight League
  - 2017 Fight League -76 kg Champion
- Kunlun Fight
  - 2016 BLADE Lightweight (-70 kg) Champion
  - 2016 Kunlun Fight Lightweight (-70 kg) Qualifier Tournament winner
  - 2017 Kunlun Fight Lightweight (-70 kg) Qualifier Tournament winner

== Fight record ==
Professional kickboxing record
43 wins (31 (T)KOs), 3 losses, 0 draws, 0 no contests
Date	Result	Opponent	Event	Location	Method	Round	Time
2026-12-12		(Serbia) Nikola Todorović	Glory Collision 10 - Welterweight Grand Prix, reserve	Arnhem, Netherlands			
2026-02-07	Win	(Cameroon) Brice Kombou	Glory 105	Arnhem, Netherlands	Decision (unanimous)	3	3:00
2025-02-22	Win	(Spain) Calmente Mendes	Glory 98	Rotterdam, Netherlands	TKO (low kicks)	3	0:37
2023-11-04	Win	(France) Diaguely Camara	Glory: Collision 6	Arnhem, Netherlands	Decision (split)	3	3:00
2021-10-23	Win	(France) Samuel Dbili	Glory: Collision 3	Arnhem, Netherlands	TKO (3 knockdowns/body punch)	1	2:28
2021-09-04	Win	(Turkey) Vedat Hödük	Glory 78: Rotterdam	Rotterdam, Netherlands	TKO (punch to the body)	1	1:20
2019-06-22	Win	(United Kingdom) Adam Hadfield	Glory 66: Paris	Paris, France	TKO (left body shot)	1	1:35
2018-12-08	Win	(Suriname) Miles Simson	Glory 62: Rotterdam	Rotterdam, Netherlands	KO (head kick)	1	1:53
2017-11-12	Loss	(Armenia) Marat Grigorian	Kunlun Fight 67 - World MAX 2017 Final 8	Sanya, China	Decision (unanimous)	3	3:00
2017-08-27	Win	(Russia) Artem Pashporin	Kunlun Fight 65 - World MAX 2017 Final 16	Qingdao, China	TKO (3 knockdowns rule)	1	2:28
Qualified to Kunlun Fight 2017 70kg World Max Tournament Final 8.
2017-08-05	Win	(Thailand) Thongchai Sitsongpeenong	Fight League 7	Tangier, Morocco	KO (right low kick)	2	1:15
Won Fight League -76 kg World Title.
2017-02-26	Win	(Brazil) Danilo Zanolini	Kunlun Fight 57 - World MAX 2017 Group 1 Tournament Final	Sanya, China	KO (left body kick)	1	0:21
Qualified to Kunlun Fight 2017 70kg World Max Tournament Final 16.
2017-02-26	Win	(Belgium) Arman Hambaryan	Kunlun Fight 57 - World MAX 2017 Group 1 Tournament Semi Finals	Sanya, China	Decision (unanimous)	3	3:00
2017-01-01	Win	(Belarus) Dzianis Zuev	Kunlun Fight 56 – 70 kg 2016 Tournament Reserve Fight	Sanya, China	Decision (unanimous)	3	3:00
2016-08-28	Win	(Thailand) Arthit Hanchana	Super Muaythai - Kunlun Fight World MAX 2016 Final 16	Bangkok, Thailand	Decision (unanimous)	3	3:00
Qualified to Kunlun Fight 2016 70kg World Max Tournament Final 8.
2016-08-07	Win	(Spain) David Ruiz	Kunlun Fight 49 / Rebels 45	Tokyo, Japan	KO (head kick)	2	1:25
Won BLADE -70 kg Title.
2016-04-23	Loss	(Thailand) Sitthichai Sitsongpeenong	Kunlun Fight 43 – World MAX 2016 Group I Tournament Final	Zhoukou, China	Ext. R decision (split)	4	3:00
2016-04-23	Win	(Belgium) Yussef Boulahtari	Kunlun Fight 43 – World MAX 2016 Group I Tournament Semi Finals	Zhoukou, China	KO (right cross)	1	2:30
2016-04-02	Win	(Morocco) Abdel Fak	Enfusion Live Gold Edition	Netherlands	TKO	2	
2016-03-09	Win	(Japan) Hinata Watanabe	Rebels. 41	Tokyo, Japan	Decision (unanimous)	3	3:00
2016-01-23	Win	(Netherlands) Brown Pinas	Sportmani Events VIII	Amsterdam, Netherlands	Decision (unanimous)	3	3:00
2015-12-06	Win	(Morocco) Brahim Kallah	Real Fighters AN2R	Netherlands	KO (right hook)	2	0:25
2015-10-31	Win	(Greece) Nikos Papadimitriou	Scorpion X-Treme Stores	Greece	Decision (majority)	3	3:00
2015-05-16	Loss	(Turkey) Vedat Hödük	A1 World Combat Cup Platinum	Eindhoven, Netherlands	Decision	3	3:00
2015-02-07	Win	(Indonesia) Melvin Wassing	Enfusion Live	Netherlands	KO	1	
2014-20-09	Win	(Netherlands) Sem Aipassa	A1 World Combat Cup	United Kingdom	KO	1	00:25
2014-03-30	Win	(United Kingdom) Luke Whelan	Chok Muay	Netherlands	Decision	3	3:00
2014-03-15	Win	(Morocco) Chakir Abdelaoui	Fight For Victory V	Netherlands	Decision	5	3:00
2014-02-22	Win	(Netherlands) Oussama Attadlaoui	Enfusion Live	Netherlands	KO		
2013-12-01	Win	(United Kingdom) Craig Jose	Masac Masters	United Kingdom	Decision	3	3:00
2013-09-22	Win	(Netherlands) Joost Mulder	Students of the Game	Netherlands	Decision	3	3:00
Legend: Win Loss Draw/no contest Notes

== See also ==
- List of male kickboxers
