= Mustapha Haida =

Moroccan-Italian Muay Thai kickboxer (born 1988)

- Born: 12 October 1988 (age 38); Tétouan, Morocco
- Other names: The Flying Dragon; Dynamite
- Nationality: Italian; Moroccan
- Height: 1.82 m (5 ft 11 1/2 in)
- Weight: 77.1 kg (170 lb; 12 st 2 lb)
- Division: Middleweight; Welterweight
- Style: Muay Thai, kickboxing
- Fighting out of: Florence, Italy
- Team: Team haida
- Years active: 2010 - present

Kickboxing record
- Total: 59
- Wins: 43
- By knockout: 23
- Losses: 12
- Draws: 4
- Last updated on: 2024

Mustapha Haida (born 12 October 1988) is a Moroccan-Italian Muay Thai kickboxer who competes in the middleweight and welterweight divisions. Throughout his career he fought for K-1, GLORY, SUPERKOMBAT, ISKA, WAKO, Kunlun Fight, Bellator Kickboxing, and ONE Championship. He was a former ISKA champion, runner up for the Bellator, ONE Championship Belt and was ranked as a top ten Welterweight by Combat Press from May 2017, until September 2017. Haida holds notable wins over fighters like Andy Souwer, Enriko Kehl, Dzianis Zuev and Abdallah Mabel.

== Martial arts career ==
Haida fought for the WAKO Intercontinental title against Madické Kamara. He won the fight by a fifth-round KO.

Mustapha unsuccessfully challenged for the ISKA Oriental Rules title held by Karim Ghajji, losing by a unanimous decision.

Haida fought in the Venum 72.5 kg Dragons Tournament. In the semifinals he scored a first-round KO victory over Kader El Kaamouchi, and in the finals won a unanimous decision against Michael Krcmar.

He won the ISKA World Oriental Rules 72.5 kg title with a unanimous decision win over Johane Beausejour.

Haida participated in the Kung Fu World Championship – 75 kg Contender Sanda Tournament but lost in the semi-finals to Miao Chenlei.

He was scheduled to challenge Regian Eersel for the ONE Lightweight Kickboxing title at ONE Championship: Fists Of Fury 3. Eersel won the fight by unanimous decision.

Haida faced Arian Sadiković at ONE: Winter Warriors II on December 17, 2021. He lost the bout via unanimous decision.

== Championships and accomplishments ==
=== Kickboxing ===
- World Association of Kickboxing Organizations
  - W.A.K.O Pro Intercontinental Championship (K-1 rules)
- International Sport Karate Association
  - I.S.K.A World -72.5 kg Championship (Oriental Rules)

== Professional kickboxing record ==
Professional kickboxing record
43 wins (23 (T)KOs), 12 losses, 4 draws
Date	Result	Opponent	Event	Location	Method	Round	Time
2025-06-07	Win	(Italy) Christian Guiderdone	Oktagon: Valle D'Aosta	Courmayeur, Italy	TKO (punches)	2	2:35
For the vacant ISKA Oriental rules World Middleweight (75kg) title. Haida missed weight and was not eligible to win the title.
2024-06-29	Draw	(United Kingdom) Jamie Bates	Oktagon Tsunami Edition	Rome, Italy	Decision	3	3:00
2023-06-03	Loss	(Japan) Shintaro Matsukura	K-1 World GP 2023: inaugural Middleweight Championship Tournament, Semi-final	Yokohama, Japan	Decision (unanimous)	3	3:00
2023-06-03	Win	(Philippines) Mike Joe	K-1 World GP 2023: inaugural Middleweight Championship Tournament, Quarter-final	Yokohama, Japan	Decision (unanimous)	3	3:00
2023-03-18	Loss	(France) Mohamed Hanoun	Night Kick Out 8	Lucca, Italy	Decision	3	3:00
2022-11-26	Win	(Italy) Christian Guiderdone	Superfights Roma	Rome, Italy	Decision (split)	3	3:00
2021-12-17	Loss	(Bosnia and Herzegovina) Arian Sadiković	ONE: Winter Warriors II	Kallang, Singapore	Decision (unanimous)	3	3:00
2021-02-26	Loss	(Suriname) Regian Eersel	ONE Championship: Fists Of Fury 3	Kallang, Singapore	Decision (unanimous)	5	3:00
For the ONE Lightweight Kickboxing World Championship.
2019-05-25	Win	(Portugal) Eder Lopes	Oktagon	Italy	KO (punches)	3	
2019-02-22	Loss	(Netherlands) Nieky Holzken	ONE Championship 91: Call to Greatness	Kallang, Singapore	Decision (unanimous)	3	3:00
2018-09-08	Win	(Australia) Daniel Dawson	ONE Championship 79: Beyond The Horizon	China	KO (straight left)	3	2:14
2017-04-08	Win	(Germany) Enriko Kehl	Bellator Kickboxing 5	Torino, Italy	Decision (split)	3	3:00
2016-10-30	Win	(France) Johane Beausejour	Oktagon	Florence, Italy	Decision (unanimous)	5	3:00
Wins the ISKA Oriental Rules World Super Light-iddleweight (72.5kg) title.
2016-09-17	Win	(Spain) Kike Bonnin	Bellator Kickboxing 3	Budapest, Hungary	Ext. R. decision (unanimous)	4	3:00
2016-04-16	Loss	(France) Karim Ghajji	Bellator Kickboxing 1	Torino, Italy	Decision (split)	5	3:00
For the Inaugural Bellator Kickboxing Welterweight Championship.
2016-01-30	Win	(China) Wang Yuhu	Thai Boxe Mania 2016	Pattaya, Thailand	Decision (unanimous)	3	3:00
2015-11-28	Win	(Czech Republic) Michael Krcmar	Venum Victory World Series – 72.5 kg Dragons Tournament, Final	Paris, France	Decision (unanimous)	3	3:00
Wins the VVWS 72.5kg Dragons Tournament.
2015-11-28	Win	(France) Kader El Kaamouchi	Venum Victory World Series – 72.5 kg Dragons Tournament, Semi-final	Paris, France	KO	1	
2015-08-22	Win	(France) Abdallah Mabel	Venum Victory World Series – 72,5 kg Tournament, Final	Debrecen, Hungary	Ext. R. decision (majority)	4	3:00
Wins the VVWS 72.5kg Dragons Tournament.
2015-08-22	Win	(Hungary) Benedek Zsolt	Venum Victory World Series – 72,5 kg Tournament, Semi-final	Debrecen, Hungary	Decision (unanimous)	3	3:00
2015-06-20	Win	(France) Édouard Bernadou	Fight Night Valdarino VI	Italy	Decision (unanimous)	3	3:00
2015-04-11	Win	(Italy) Pasquale Mangini	Oktagon 2015: 20 Years Edition	Milan, Italy	Decision (unanimous)	3	3:00
2015-03-17	Loss	(Belarus) Chingiz Allazov	Kunlun Fight 21 – World MAX 2015 Group H Tournament Semi-finals	Sanya, China	Decision (unanimous)	3	3:00
2014-10-05	Win	(Belarus) Dzianis Zuev	Kunlun Fight 11 – World MAX Tournament 2015 Final 8	Macao, China	Decision (unanimous)	3	3:00
Qualified to Kunlun Fight 2014 70 kg World MAX Tournament Final.
2014-07-27	Win	(Netherlands) Andy Souwer	Kunlun Fight 7 – World MAX Tournament 2015 Final 16	Zhoukou, China	Ext. R. decision (unanimous)	4	3:00
Qualified to Kunlun Fight 2014 70 kg World MAX Tournament Final 8.
2014-05-30	Loss	(France) Karim Ghajji	Final Fight I	Le Havre, France	Decision	5	3:00
For ISKA Oriental Rules World title (-78 kg).
2013-11-03	Win	(Romania) Bogdan Stanciu	SUPERKOMBAT New Heroes 6	Italy	KO	2	
2013-04-20	Loss	(Thailand) Moses Saengtiennoi	Oktagon 2013	Milan, Italy	TKO	2	
2013-02-09	Loss	(Italy) Riccardo Lecca	Invictus	Rome, Italy	TKO	4	
2012-11-03	Loss	(England) Jordan Watson	Glory 3: Rome	Milan, Italy	Decision (unanimous)	3	3:00
2012-06-09	Win	(France) Madické Kamara	Fight Night Valdarno	Italy	KO	5	
Wins WAKO Intercontinental Title -158 lbs title
2012-05-05	Win	(Italy) Sharos Huyer	D-Fight	Italy	KO		
2012-03-24	Win	(Turkey) Hunkar Kilic	Oktagon 2012	Milan, Italy	Decision (unanimous)	3	3:00
2012-02-04	Win	(Italy) Marco Re	Thai Boxe Mania 2012	Turin, Italy	Decision (unanimous)	3	3:00
2011-02-06	Win	(Portugal) Arnaldo Silva	Night Kick Out V	Turin, Italy	Decision (unanimous)	3	3:00
2010-07-23	Draw	(France) Wald Haddad	Le Choc Des Gladiateurs IX	France	Decision	3	3:00
Legend: Win Loss Draw/no contest Notes

== Sanda record ==
Sanda record
Date	Result	Opponent	Event	Location	Method	Round	Time
2017-01-24	Loss	(China) Miao Chenlei	Kung Fu World Championship – 75 kg Contender Sanda Tournament, Semi-finals	Hunan, China	Decision (unanimous)	3	3:00

== See also ==
- List of male kickboxers
