= Arian Sadiković =

German kickboxer

- Born: November 21, 1994 (age 31); Hannover, Germany
- Other names: Game Over
- Height: 1.83 m (6 ft 0 in)
- Weight: 77.1 kg (170 lb; 12.14 st)
- Division: Lightweight (ONE); Welterweight
- Style: Kickboxing
- Fighting out of: Hannover, Germany
- Team: Fightschool Hannover

Kickboxing record
- Total: 43
- Wins: 38
- By knockout: 18
- Losses: 5
- By knockout: 0

Mixed martial arts record
- Total: 2
- Wins: 2
- By knockout: 2
- Losses: 0

Arian Sadiković (born 21 November 1994) is a German-Bosnian kickboxer and mixed martial artist.

As of January 2024 he was the No.8 ranked Welterweight kickboxer in the world by Beyond Kickboxing.

Sadiković has previously fought for the Glory and ONE Championship promotions where he holds notable wins over Nieky Holzken, Sergej Braun and Mustapha Haida.

== Biography and career ==
Sadiković was born in Hanover, the son of Bosnian refugees, he used sports to avoid trouble. He followed his brother into kickboxing training at the age of 13.

=== Kickboxing career ===
==== Early career ====
On November 4, 2017, Sadiković faced Hamid Rezaie at Get in the Ring 17 in Hamburg, Germany. He won the fight by decision.

On September 29, 2018, Sadiković faced Bilal Loukili at Enfusion 71 in Hamburg, Germany. He lost the fight by decision.

Sadiković faced Sergej Braun at Mix Fight Championship 25 on December 1, 2018. He won a close contested fight by split decision.

==== Glory ====
Sadiković made his debut in the Glory promotion at Glory 64: Strasbourg on March 9, 2019, against Mike Lemaire. He lost the fight by split decision.

In his next fight for Glory he faced Dani Traoré at Glory 69: Düsseldorf on October 12, 2019. He won the fight by unanimous decision.

==== ONE Championship ====
Sadiković faced Mustapha Haida at ONE: Winter Warriors II on December 17, 2021. He won the bout via unanimous decision.

Sadiković faced Regian Eersel for the ONE Lightweight Kickboxing World Championship at ONE 156 on April 22, 2022. He lost the fight by unanimous decision despite having scored an early knockdown.

Sadiković faced former Glory champion Nieky Holzken at ONE Fight Night 11 on June 10, 2023. At the weigh-ins, Holzken weighed in at 176 pounds, 6 pounds over the lightweight limit. As a result, the bout proceeded as a catchweight and Holzken was fined 30% of his fight purse, which went to Sadiković. He won the fight by unanimous decision.

==== Return to Glory ====
It was announced on August 2, 2024, that Sadikovic had re-signed with Glory. He was booked to face Vedat Hödük at Glory 95 on September 21, 2024. He lost the fight by split decision, after an extra fourth round was contested.

== Titles and accomplishments ==
=== Kickboxing ===
- Hype Fighting Championship
  - 2017 Hype FC 4-man tournament Winner

== Mixed martial arts record ==
Professional record breakdown
2 matches	2 wins	0 losses
By knockout	2	0
By submission	0	0
By decision	0	0

Res.	Record	Opponent	Method	Event	Date	Round	Time	Location	Notes
Win	2–0	Jixie Molapo	TKO (punches)	Oktagon 82	January 17, 2026	2	0:38	Düsseldorf, Germany	Catchweight (173 lb) bout.
Win	1–0	Robert Wagner	TKO (corner stoppage)	GMC: Fightschool Mix Fight Night	November 2, 2024	1	1:07	Hanover, Germany	Welterweight debut.

== Kickboxing record ==
Professional Kickboxing record
38 Wins (18 (T)KOs), 5 losses, 0 draws
Date	Result	Opponent	Event	Location	Method	Round	Time
2024-09-21	Loss	(Turkey) Vedat Hödük	Glory 95	Zagreb, Croatia	Ext.R Decision (Split)	4	3:00
2023-06-10	Win	(Netherlands) Nieky Holzken	ONE Fight Night 11	Bangkok, Thailand	Decision (Unanimous)	3	3:00
2022-04-22	Loss	(Suriname) Regian Eersel	ONE 156	Kallang, Singapore	Decision (Unanimous)	5	3:00
For the ONE Lightweight Kickboxing World Championship.
2021-12-17	Win	(Italy) Mustapha Haida	ONE: Winter Warriors II	Kallang, Singapore	Decision (Unanimous)	3	3:00
2019-10-12	Win	(Germany) Dani Traoré	Glory 69: Düsseldorf	Düsseldorf, Germany	Decision (Unanimous)	3	3:00
2019-03-09	Loss	(United States) Mike Lemaire	Glory 64: Strasbourg	Strasbourg, France	Decision (Split)	3	3:00
2018-12-01	Win	(Germany) Sergej Braun	Mix Fight Championship 25	Hamburg, Germany	Decision (Split)	3	3:00
2018-10-27	Win	(Armenia) Armen Hovhannisyan	Enfusion Talents No. 61	Oberhausen, Germany	Decision	3	3:00
2018-09-29	Loss	(Morocco) Bilal Loukili	Enfusion 71	Hamburg, Germany	Decision	3	3:00
2018-01-27	Win	(Turkey) Sinan Uluturk	Mix Fight Championship 24	İzmir, Turkey	KO (Right cross)	3	2:40
2017-12-16	Win	(Germany) Ekrem Doruk	Hype FC 6 – Tournament Final	Bremen, Germany	TKO (Corner stoppage/punches)	2	1:15
Wins Hype FC K-1 -76kg title.
2017-12-16	Win	(Germany) Ali Shams	Hype FC 6 – Tournament Semi-final	Bremen, Germany	TKO (Doctor stoppage)	1	2:10
2017-12-02	Win	(Turkey) Erdi Sür	Mix Fight Championship 23	Frankfurt, Germany	Decision (Unanimous)	3	3:00
2017-11-04	Win	(Germany) Hamid Rezaie	Get in the Ring 17	Hamburg, Germany	Decision	3	3:00
2017-07-01	Loss	(Turkey) Adem Bozkurt	Champions Night 2	İstanbul, Turkey	Decision (Split)	3	3:00
2017-06-24	Win	(Switzerland) Rico Ramba Giger	Best of Sparta IX Fight Night	Amriswil, Switzerland	KO (Left hook to the body)	2	2:00
2017-05-20	Win	(Serbia) Zoran Solaja	Hype FC Rumble in the Cage	Bremen, Germany	Decision (Unanimous)	4	3:00
2017-04-22	Win	(Poland) Matthias Jaskola	K1 Platinium Cup	Wuppertal, Germany	Decision (Unanimous)	3	3:00
2016-11-05	Win	(Germany) Angelo Zoppo	A1 World Combat Cup	Wuppertal, Germany	KO (Flying knee)	1	1:34
2016-06-04	Win	(Albania) Denis Ademi	Day of Destruction 11	Neustadt am Rübenberge, Germany	Decision (Unanimous)	3	3:00
2014-11-09	Win	(Germany) Mike Jäde	Fight to Fight 3	Halle/Saale, Germany	TKO	3	1:30
2013-11-02	Win	(Germany) Mario Kolak	Fight toFight 2	Halle/Saale, Germany	TKO (ref. stoppage)	1	1:35
Legend: Win Loss Draw/No contest Notes

== See also ==
- List of male kickboxers
- List of Germans
- List of Bosniaks
- List of Montenegrins
- Bosniaks of Montenegro
