= Oryol (inhabited locality) =

Oryol (Russian: Орёл), alternatively spelled Orel, is the name of several inhabited localities in Russia.

Urban localities

- Oryol, a city in Oryol Oblast; 52°58′N 36°7′E

Rural localities

- Oryol, Altai Krai, a settlement in Zelenoroshchinsky Selsoviet of Rebrikhinsky District in Altai Krai; 53°7′N 82°38′E
- Oryol, Chuvash Republic, a settlement in Berezovskoye Rural Settlement of Ibresinsky District in the Chuvash Republic
- Oryol, Nizhny Novgorod Oblast, a village in Strelsky Selsoviet of Vadsky District in Nizhny Novgorod Oblast; 55°31′N 44°4′E
- Oryol, Novgorod Oblast, a village in Borovskoye Settlement of Khvoyninsky District in Novgorod Oblast
- Oryol, Perm Krai, a settlement in Usolsky District of Perm Krai
- Oryol, Primorsky Krai, a khutor in Partizansky District of Primorsky Krai
- Oryol (Polnovskaya Rural Settlement), Gdovsky District, Pskov Oblast, a village in Gdovsky District of Pskov Oblast; municipally, a part of Polnovskaya Rural Settlement of that district
- Oryol (Dobruchinskaya Rural Settlement), Gdovsky District, Pskov Oblast, a village in Gdovsky District of Pskov Oblast; municipally, a part of Dobruchinskaya Rural Settlement of that district
- Oryol, Republic of Tatarstan, a village in Laishevsky District of the Republic of Tatarstan
- Oryol, Vologda Oblast, a village in Merezhsky Selsoviet of Ustyuzhensky District in Vologda Oblast
