= Oryol, Vologda Oblast =

Oryol Орёл
- Village
- Location within Vologda Oblast Location within Russia
- Coordinates: 58°57′N 36°25′E
- Country: Russia
- Region: Vologda Oblast
- District: Ustyuzhensky District
- Time zone: UTC+3:00

Oryol (Russian: Орёл) is a rural locality (a village) in Lentyevskoye Rural Settlement, Ustyuzhensky District, Vologda Oblast, Russia. The population was 66 as of 2002. There are 7 streets.

== Geography ==
Oryol is located 24 km (15 mi) north of Ustyuzhna (the district's administrative centre) by road. Ogib is the nearest rural locality.
