= Mineyev =

Mineyev or Mineev (Russian: Минеев) is a Russian masculine surname, its feminine counterpart is Mineyeva or Mineeva. It may refer to

- Aleksandr Mineyev (born 1988), Russian football player
- Maksim Mineyev (born 1984), Russian football player
- Olga Mineyeva (born 1952), Soviet runner
- Viktor Mineyev (1937–2002), Soviet modern pentathlete
- Vladimir Mineev (born 1990), Russian heavyweight kick boxer
- Vladimir Petrovich Mineev (born 1945), Russian theoretical physicist
