= Ibrahim El Boustati =

Dutch-Moroccan kickboxer (born 1995)

- Born: Ibrahim El Boustati; October 1, 1995 (age 31); Netherlands
- Other names: The Beast
- Nationality: Dutch; Moroccan
- Height: 1.86 m (6 ft 1 in)
- Weight: 86 kg (190 lb; 13 st 8 lb)
- Division: Cruiserweight; Middleweight
- Style: Kickboxing
- Stance: Orthodox
- Team: FIGHTCLUB 070
- Trainer: Hafid El Boustati
- Years active: 2014–present

Kickboxing record
- Total: 52
- Wins: 47
- By knockout: 20
- Losses: 4
- By knockout: 4
- No contests: 1

Ibrahim El Boustati (born 1 October 1995) is a Dutch-Moroccan kickboxer competing as a cruiserweight and Middleweight in Enfusion. He has spent his whole career fighting under their banner. He has held titles in three different weight classes in the organization, thrice at 187 lbs, and once at 198 lbs. He has throughout his career been ranked as one of the best kickboxers in the world.

== Personal life ==
Ibrahim played football as a child. He began training kickboxing aged ten, after his brother invited him to a kickboxing gym. He works as an investigative officer with the Nederlandse Spoorwegen.

== Kickboxing career ==
El Boustati made his Enfusion debut in 2014, aged 18, when he faced Ali Sabab. He won by TKO, after the ringside doctor stopped the fight.

After his debut, Ibrahim won his next six fights, earning a chance to fight for the Enfusion 85 kg title. He won the fight by knockout, winning his first career title.

He went on another winning streak, winning his next five fights, two by TKO. He later defended the 85 kg title, when he faced 42-14-4 Mirco Cingel. He won the fight by unanimous decision.

Afterwards, he beat Filip Verlinden which later was overturned. He then fought against Andrew Tate for the 90 kg title. He won the fight by TKO.

El Boustati lost to Ulrik Bokeme in his next fight, then defended the 85 kg title, winning a unanimous decision against Filip Verlinden

His next five fights would be the worst stretch of his career, losing three of his next five, all by knockout.

El Boustati was scheduled to fight Francis Goma at -95 kg during Enfusion 97. The fight was cancelled and Boustati has not fought again since, leaving Boustati with a record of 18-4-0-1NC with the promotion.

== Championships and accomplishments ==
=== Kickboxing ===
- Enfusion
  - Enfusion –85 kg World Championship (–187 lb)
    - Two successful title defenses
  - Enfusion –90 kg World Championship (–198 lb)

== Kickboxing record ==
Kickboxing record
47 wins (20 KOs), 4 losses, 0 draws, 1 no contest
Date	Result	Opponent	Event	Location	Method	Round	Time	Record
2020-02-29	Loss	(Morocco) Ziad Mouhout	Enfusion 96	Eindhoven, Netherlands	Knockout	1	3:00	47-4-1NC
2019-11-2	Win	(Morocco) Mustapha El Barbari	Enfusion Talents 76	Antwerp, Belgium	Knockout	2	3:00	47-3-1NC
2018-05-05	Loss	(Spain) Lorenzo Javier Jorge	Enfusion	Antwerp, Belgium	Knockout	1	3:00	46-3-1NC
2017-11-18	Loss	(Switzerland) Ulrik Bokeme	Glorious Heroes Presents Enfusion League	Groningen, Netherlands	TKO (ref stoppage)	1	3:00	46-2-1NC
2017-09-16	Win	(Brazil) Mauricio Costa Cardoso	Enfusion Live	Zwolle, Netherlands	Knockout	3	3:00	46-1-1NC
2017-04-29	Win	(Belgium) Filip Verlinden	Fightsense presents Enfusion Live	Zoetermeer, Netherlands	Decision (unanimous)	3	3:00	45-1-1NC
Defends the Enfusion World Title (85KG)
2017-02-18	Loss	(Switzerland) Ulrik Bokeme	Enfusion 56	Eindhoven, Netherlands	Knockout	1	3:00	44-1-1NC
2016-12-13	Win	(United States) Andrew Tate	Enfusion 44	The Hague, Netherlands	TKO (eye injury)	1	3:00	44-0-1NC
Wins Enfusion World Title -198 lb (-90 kg).
2016-09-17	NC	(Belgium) Filip Verlinden	Enfusion 41	Antwerp, Belgium	(overturned)	3	3:00	43-0-1NC
2016-04-02	Win	(Slovakia) Miroslav Cingel	Enfusion 28	The Hague, Netherlands	Decision (unanimous)	3	3:00	43–0
Billed at 42-0, Defends the Enfusion World Title -187 lb (-85 kg).
2016-02-27	Win	(Netherlands) Patrick Van Rees	Enfusion 38	Eindhoven, Netherlands	Knockout	3	3:00	
2016-01-23	Win	(Turkey) Ertugrul Bayrak	Sportmani Events VIII	Amsterdam, Netherlands	Decision (unanimous)	3	3:00	
2015-11-28	Win	(Morocco) Samir Boukhidous	Fightsense	The Hague, Netherlands	Disqualification	2	3:00	
2015-09-19	Win	(Morocco) Karoucha Ahmed	Enfusion	Benahavís, Spain	Decision (unanimous)	3	3:00	
2015-05-23	Win	(Netherlands) Clyde Brunswijk	Superkombat World Grand Prix Series	Bucharest, Romania	Decision (unanimous)	3	3:00	
2015-04-25	Win	(Slovakia) Tomas Senkyr	Gala Night Thaiboxing	Žilina, Slovakia	Knockout	2	3:00	
Wins Enfusion World Title -187 lb (-85 kg).
2015-04-04	Win	(Netherlands) Iwan Pang	Enfusion Talents 8	La Haye, Netherlands	Knockout	2	3:00	
2015-03-07	Win	(Netherlands) Mohamed Tahtari	Fight League - The Beginning	Hoofddorp, Netherlands	Decision (unanimous)	3	3:00	
2014-12-21	Win	(Morocco) Khalid El Bakouri	Enfusion 23	Pica Mare, Netherlands	Decision (unanimous)	3	3:00	
2014-11-29	Win	(Afghanistan) Rushad Moradi	Fightsense VI	The Hague, Netherlands	Decision (unanimous)	3	3:00	
2014-06-07	Win	(Netherlands) Boubaker El Bakouri	Fightsense	The Hague, Netherlands	Decision (unanimous)	3	3:00	
2014-04-05	Win	(Netherlands) Rick Van De Heuvel	Fightsense	The Hague, Netherlands	Knockout	3	3:00	
2014-02-22	Win	(Netherlands) Ali Sabab	Enfusion Sportmani Events V	Amsterdam, Netherlands	Knockout	1	3:00	
	Legend: Win Loss Draw/no contest Notes							

== See also ==
- List of male kickboxers
