= Marvin Perry =

Trinidad and Tobago martial artist

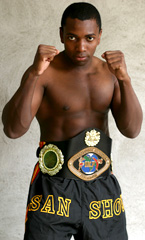
- Born: November 10, 1977 (age 48); Trinidad, Trinidad and Tobago
- Nationality: (Trinidad and Tobago) Trinidadian and Tobagonian (United States) American
- Division: Cruiserweight; Heavyweight
- Style: Kickboxing, Muay Thai, Sanshou
- Fighting out of: Boston, Massachusetts, USA
- Team: Red Line Fight Sports

Kickboxing record
- Total: 24
- Wins: 23
- By knockout: 10
- Losses: 1
- Draws: 0

Marvin Perry (born November 10, 1977) is a Trinidadian and Tobagonian former kickboxer.

Perry started training in Karate at the age of 13. He then trained for about two years before coming to the United States and beginning training in Kung Fu. After training in Kung Fu he was introduced to San Shou by Al Loriaux.

He is now retired and teaches as a Head Instructor at Red Line Fight Sports, a gym in Boston, Massachusetts.

The International Kickboxing Federation (IKF) national amateur heavyweight san shou title Perry won in 2001 was stripped by the IKF in 2002 when it found he had been fighting professionally since 2000.

== Titles ==
- 2001 USKBA Muay Thai Heavyweight Champion
- 2001 USKBA Super Cruiserweight Northeast Championship
- 2001 IKF Amateur Heavyweight San Shou National Champion (stripped 2002)
- 2000 USKBA North East Full Contact Kickboxing Champion
- 2000 USKBA Super Cruiserweight New England Championship Title
- 2000 USAWKF West Coast San Shou National Champion
- 2000 USAWKF East Coast San Shou National Champion
- 1999 USAWKF San Shou National Champion
- 1998 USAWKF San Shou National Champion
- 1997 International Chinese Martial Arts San Shou Champion
