= Hicham El Gaoui =

Greek-Moroccan kickboxer and K-1 fighter

- Born: Hicham El Gaoui
- Other names: The Magician
- Nationality: Moroccan; Dutch
- Height: 1.89 m (6 ft 2 1/2 in)
- Weight: 80 kg (176 lb; 12 st 8 lb)
- Style: Kickboxing, Muay Thai
- Stance: Orthodox
- Team: Bully's Gym; Fighting Talents

Kickboxing record
- Total: 60
- Wins: 51
- Losses: 7
- Draws: 2

Hicham El Gaoui is a Moroccan-Dutch former kickboxer and K-1 fighter who competed in the cruiserweight division. Combat Press ranked him as a top ten middleweight kickboxer between November 2021 and March 2022, peaking at #4.

He trained Bilal Loukili, Mohammed Jaraya and Ilias Bulaid at Fighting Talents in Den Bosch.

== Titles ==
- World Fighting League
  - 2015 WFL -84 kg Tournament Champion
- Enfusion
  - 2014 Enfusion Live World Champion -80 kg (1 title defence)
- Tatneft Cup
  - 2012 Tatneft Arena World Cup 2012 runner-up -80 kg
- International Federation of Muaythai Associations
  - 2009 IFMA World Championships -81 kg (bronze)

== Professional kickboxing record ==
Professional kickboxing record
52 wins (6 (T)KOs), 7 losses, 2 draws, 1 no contest
Date	Result	Opponent	Event	Location	Method	Round	Time
2019-11-02	Win	(Morocco) Boubaker El Bakouri	Enfusion Live 90	Antwerp, Belgium	TKO	3	
2018-02-10	Win	(Democratic Republic of the Congo) Ulric Bokeme	Enfusion Live	France	Decision	3	3:00
2017-07-15	Loss	(Belarus) Igor Bugaenko	ACB KB 10: Russia vs. China	Russia	Decision (unanimous)	3	3:00
2017-05-06	Loss	(Slovakia) Vladimír Moravčík	Enfusion Live	Slovakia	Decision	5	3:00
2017-03-18	Win	(Morocco) Boubaker El Bakouri	Enfusion Live 47 & Kickboxing Talents 29	Netherlands	Decision (unanimous)	3	3:00
Win 85 kg tournament
2017-03-18	Win	(Netherlands) Joey Smits	Enfusion Live 47 & Kickboxing Talents 29	Netherlands	TKO	1	
2016-12-10	Win	(Belarus) Dmitry Valent	Kunlun Fight 55 – 80 kg Tournament, Semi Finals	China	Decision	3	3:00
2016-09-17	Win	(France) Mehdi Bouanane	Enfusion Live 41	Belgium	TKO	1	3:00
2016-06-04	Win	(Spain) Rafael Carzola Pimentel	Enfusion Live 40	Spain	TKO	4	3:00
2015-11-21	Loss	(Ukraine) Artur Kyshenko	Enfusion Live 34	Groningen, Netherlands	Decision	3	3:00
2015-04-12	Win	(Morocco) Ibrahim El Bouni	World Fighting League, Final	Hoofddorp, Netherlands	Decision	3	3:00
Wins World Fighting League -84 kg Tournament Title.
2015-04-12	Win	(Netherlands) Sem Braan	World Fighting League, Semi Finals	Hoofddorp, Netherlands	Decision	3	3:00
2015-03-28	Draw	(Turkey) Yücel Fidan	Fightersheart III	Arnhem, Netherlands	Draw	3	3:00
2015-03-14	Win	(Armenia) Karapet Karapetyan	Enfusion Live 25	Turnhout, Belgium	Decision (unanimous)	5	3:00
Retains Enfusion Live World Championship -80 kg.
2014-11-29	Win	(Afghanistan) Masoud Rahimi	Fightsense VI	The Hague, Netherlands	Decision	3	3:00
2014-09-20	Win	(Morocco) Khalid El Bakouri	A1 World Combat Cup - Final 8, Super Fight (82 kg)	Eindhoven, Netherlands	Decision	3	3:00
2014-06-12	Loss	(Czech Republic) Jiří Žák	Gibu Fight Night (86 kg)	Prague, Czech Republic	Decision (majority)	3	3:00
2014-05-17	Win	(Turkey) Ertuğrul Bayrak	A1 World Combat Cup	Eindhoven, Netherlands	KO		
2014-04-05	Win	(Ukraine) Andrii Panov	Enfusion Live 16 (85 kg)	The Hague, Netherlands	KO	2	
2014-03-22	Win	(Republic of Ireland) Aidan Brooks	Enfusion Live 15	Eindhoven, Netherlands	TKO	2	
Wins vacant Enfusion Live World Championship -80 kg.
2013-09-20	Win	(United Kingdom) Scott Smith	NKB: Main Fights	Amsterdam, Netherlands	KO (body shot)	1	2:44
2013-03-30	Loss	(Slovakia) Vladimir Idranyi	Tatneft Cup 2013 1st selection 1/4 final (-80 kg)	Nizhnekamsk, Russia	Decision (unanimous)	4	3:00
2013-02-23	Win	(Brazil) Anderson Arcanjo	Tatneft Cup 2013 4th selection 1/8 final (-80 kg)	Kazan, Russia	Decision (unanimous)	4	3:00
2012-12-01	Loss	(Netherlands) Boy Boy Martin	Fighters Heart	Arnhem, Netherlands	TKO (doc. stop.)		
2012-10-20	Loss	(Russia) Alexander Stetsurenko	Tatneft Arena World Cup 2012 final (80 kg)	Kazan, Russia	Decision (unanimous)	4	3:00
For Tatneft Arena World Cup 2012 (-80 kg) title.
2012-07-19	Win	(Belarus) Yordan Yankov	Tatneft Cup 2012 semi final (80 kg)	Kazan, Russia	Decision (unanimous)	4	3:00
2012-06-02	Win	(Ukraine) Vitaly Nikiforov	Tatneft Cup 2012 2nd selection 1/4 final (80 kg)	Kazan, Russia	Decision (unanimous)	4	3:00
2012-04-05	Win	(Belarus) Konstantin Gorokhov	Tatneft Cup 2012 4th selection 1/8 final	Kazan, Russia	RTD	2	
2012-02-26	Win	(Afghanistan) Masoud Rahimi	Vuisten Van Vuur	's-Hertogenbosch, Netherlands	Decision)	3	3.00
2011-11-12	Win	(Russia) Alexander Stetsurenko	Tatneft Cup 2011 Final (80 kg)	Kazan, Russia	Decision (unanimous)	3	3:00
2011-10-16	Win	(Morocco) L'houcine Ouzgni	Beverwijk Top Team Gala	Beverwijk, Netherlands	Decision		
2011-05-21	Win	(France) Dany Bill	Le Choc Des Légendes	Saint Ouen, France	Decision (unanimous)	3	3:00
2011-05-08	Win	(Netherlands) Amin Chakoud	Veni Vidi Vici 3	Veenendaal, Netherlands	Decision	3	3:00
2010-04-10	Win	(Turkey) Ali Cenik	Star Muay Fight Night	Maastricht, Netherlands	Decision	2	
2010-03-28	Win	(Greece) Alexandros Nikoladis	Spartan Warriors 3	Athens, Greece	Decision	3	3:00
2009-03-29	Win	(Armenia) Sahak Parparyan	The Outland Rumble III	Rotterdam, Netherlands	Decision	5	3:00
2008-05-18	Win	(Netherlands) Errol Koning	Masters of the Ring, Zonnehuis	Amsterdam, Netherlands	RTD	4	2:00
Legend: Win Loss Draw/no contest Notes

== See also ==
- List of male kickboxers
