= Filip Verlinden =

Belgian kickboxer (born 1982)

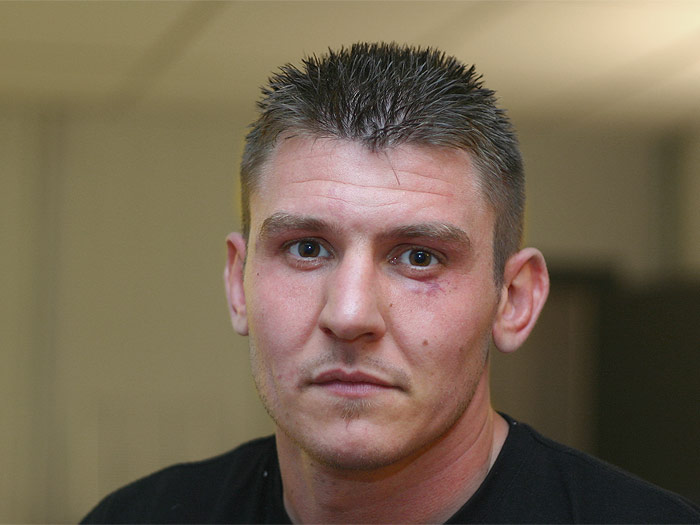
- Verlinden in 2013
- Born: 26 December 1982 (age 43); Lier, Belgium
- Other names: The Belgian Bull; Fille
- Height: 1.88 m (6 ft 2 in)
- Weight: 95 kg (209 lb; 15.0 st)
- Division: Cruiserweight; Heavyweight
- Reach: 75.5 in (192 cm)
- Style: Kickboxing, Muay Thai
- Fighting out of: Breda, Netherlands
- Team: Bulls Gym; Golden Glory Breda
- Trainer: Wim Verlinden; Cor Hemmers; Nicky Hemmers
- Years active: –present

Kickboxing record
- Total: 71
- Wins: 47
- By knockout: 17
- Losses: 22
- Draws: 1
- No contests: 1

Other information
- Website: www.filipverlinden.com
- Last updated on: 21 June 2014

Filip Verlinden (born 26 December 1982) is a Belgian retired kickboxer who peaked number 6 in the world in 2014.

== Early life ==
Filip Verlinden was born in Lier, Belgium, and raised in Heist-op-den-Berg, Belgium. His father, Wim, was a Belgian champion kickboxer who trained under Cor Hemmers and so Filip was introduced to the sport at an early age, beginning kickboxing and Muay Thai at the age of ten. He himself would go on to train under Hemmers at Golden Glory Breda in the Netherlands while also being coached by his father at Bulls Gym in his homeland.

== Career ==
After a rather unremarkable beginning to his career, in which he won fights against notables such as Rustemi Kreshnik, Dave Vader and lost a decision against Simon Marcus, Verlinden transcended the local Belgian circuit when he outpointed Marian Baryla to win the WKA European Super Cruiserweight (-90 kg/198.4 lb) Muay Thai Championship. He then made his debut with the It's Showtime promotion on 18 March 2009, losing on points to Rico Verhoeven in a heavyweight bout at Fights at the Border presents: It's Showtime 2009 in Antwerp, Belgium. He rebounded by winning the WKA World Cruiserweight (-85.9 kg/189.4 lb) title in Switzerland later that year.

In late 2010, Verlinden was recruited by United Glory to compete in the 2010-2011 World Series, an eight-man heavyweight tournament. The tournament kicked off in Amsterdam, Netherlands at United Glory 12: 2010-2011 World Series Quarterfinals on 16 October 2010 and Verlinden was eliminated when he lost to Brice Guidon by unanimous decision in a back-and-forth fight. He then returned to amateur Muay Thai to compete at the 2010 IFMA World Championships in Bangkok, Thailand in December 2010, winning the gold medal in the +91 kg/200 lb division. He defeated all three of his opponents on points, Sergei Lascenko in the quarter-finals, Alexei Kudin in the semis and Christian Colombo in the final.

Despite losing in his first outing in the promotion, Verlinden was invited to United Glory's next event to face Frédéric Sinistra in a non-tournament fight at United Glory 13: 2010-2011 World Series Semifinals in Charleroi, Belgium, on 19 March 2011. Verlinded outworked and outstruck Sinistra to win a unanimous decision in a bout to determine Belgium's top heavyweight kickboxer. He then signed with the Muaythai Premier League in August 2011 to compete in the short-lived promotion's -95 kg/210 lb heavyweight class. In his debut appearance, he scored a one-sided victory against Martin Jahn at Muaythai Premier League: Stars and Stripes in Long Beach, California, United States on 2 September 2011. After hurting his German opponent with a right overhand in round one a coming close to finishing him, the ringside physician stopped the bout at the end of the opening stanza due to a cut above Jahn's eye, giving Verlinden the TKO win. He beat Chris Knowles by way of unanimous decision at Muaythai Premier League: Blood and Steel in The Hague, Netherlands on 6 November 2011.

Verlinden made his return to It's Showtime three years after his first fight there to challenge Danyo Ilunga for his It's Showtime 95MAX (-95 kg/209 lb) Championship at Music Hall & BFN Group present: It's Showtime 57 & 58 in Brussels, Belgium, on 30 June 2012. He wobbled Ilunga with a knee strike in round one but it was not enough to secure victory as he lost by split decision after a scrappy, action-filled five round fight. After It's Showtime was bought out by the newly formed Glory organization, Verlinden soon transferred across and made his promotional debut in Brussels on 6 October 2012 at Glory 2: Brussels where he took a unanimous decision win over Fabiano Cyclone having scored a knockdown with a left hook in the second round.

He was among the best heavyweights in the world when he competed in the sixteen man 2012 Glory Heavyweight Grand Slam at Glory 4: Tokyo - 2012 Heavyweight Grand Slam in Saitama, Japan on 31 December 2012. Although he lost to Remy Bonjasky by unanimous decision at the opening round, his stock still rose in the world of international kickboxing. The lightest fighter in the tournament at 93.1 kg/205 lb, he was able to take the second round from Bonjasky and essentially force the fight into the third due to the "best of three" format in the tournament.

He made the drop down to Glory's -95 kg/209 lb light heavyweight division for his next fight at Glory 6: Istanbul in Istanbul, Turkey on 6 April 2013, when he was initially set to face Unai Unzai but his opponent was changed to Lucian Danilencu. He defeated Danilencu by unanimous decision in a rather lackluster affair.

Verlinden entered his third tournament and first at his natural weight class when he competed at Glory 9: New York - 2013 95kg Slam in New York City, New York, US on 22 June 2013. He took a controversial split decision over Steve McKinnon in the quarter-finals but lost out in a technical battle to eventual champion Tyrone Spong in the semis, losing by unanimous decision.

Verlinden lost to promotional newcomer Saulo Cavalari by unanimous decision at Glory 11: Chicago - Heavyweight World Championship Tournament in Hoffman Estates, Illinois, US on 12 October 2013.

He dropped down to Glory's middleweight (-85 kg/187 lb) division and defeated Israel Adesanya via unanimous decision at Glory 15: Istanbul in Istanbul, Turkey on 12 April 2014.

Verlinden competed in the Glory 17: Los Angeles - Last Man Standing middleweight tournament in Inglewood, California, US on 21 June 2014. He scored a first round knockdown over Melvin Manhoef with a head kick en route to a majority decision win in the quarter-finals before losing to the eventual champion Artem Levin in the semi-finals by unanimous decision.

In 2017 Verlinden fought Ibrahim el Boustati for the Enfusion world title losing by decision.

== Championships and awards ==
=== Kickboxing ===
- Belgian Kickboxing
  - Belgian +95 kg/209 lb Championship
- International Federation of Muaythai Amateur
  - 2010 IFMA World Championships +91 kg/200 lb Gold Medalist (gold)
- World Kickboxing Association
  - WKA European Super Cruiserweight (-90 kg/198.4 lb) Muay Thai Championship
  - WKA World Thaiboxing Cruiserweight (-85.9 kg/189.4 lb) Championship
- International Sport Karate Association
  - 2026 ISKA Uinified rules World Cruiserweight (-88.5 kg) Champion

== Fight record ==
Professional kickboxing record
47 wins (17 KOs), 22 losses, 1 draws, 1NC
Date	Result	Opponent	Event	Location	Method	Round	Time
2026-06-06	Win	(Italy) Luca Ventarato	Saturday Fight Fever	Putte, Belgium	Decision (unanimous)	5	3:00
Wins the vacant ISKA Unified rules World Cruiserweight (-88.5 kg) title.
2018-12-07	Loss	(Switzerland) Ulric Bokeme	Enfusion Live	United Arab Emirates	Decision	3	3:00
2018-09-15	Win	(Morocco) Mohamed El Moussaoui	Enfusion Live 70	Belgium	TKO (Referee Stoppage)	2	
2018-05-05	Loss	(Morocco) Boubaker El Bakouri	Enfusion Live	Spain	Decision	3	3:00
2017-12-9	Loss	(United States) Joe Schilling	Bellator Kickboxing 8: Florence	Florence, Italy	Decision (unanimous)	3	3:00
2017-11-18	Win	(Brazil) Mauricio Costa Cardoso	Enfusion Live 56, League R. 2	Groningen, Netherlands	Decision	3	3:00
2017-09-16	Loss	(Spain) Lorenzo Javier Jorge	Enfusion Live 52, League R. 1	Zwolle, Netherlands	Decision	3	3:00
2017-08-04	Loss	(Russia) Mikhail Chalykh	Fight Night Saint-Tropez	France	Decision	3	3:00
2017-04-29	Loss	(Morocco) Ibrahim El Boustati	Enfusion Live 49	The Hague, Netherlands	Decision (unanimous)	3	3:00
For the Enfusion Live middleweight Championship -85 kg.
2016-09-17	NC	(Morocco) Ibrahim El Boustati	Enfusion Live 41	Anvers, Belgium	Decision (overturned)	3	3:00
2016-07-02	Loss	(Nigeria) Israel Adesanya	Glory of Heroes 3	Jiyuan, Henan, China	Decision (unanimous)	3	3:00
2016-03-12	Loss	(Netherlands) Jason Wilnis	Glory 28: Paris	Paris, France	Decision (unanimous)	3	3:00
Record 44-15-1 documented by Glory.
2015-08-04	Loss	(Russia) Aleksander Vezhevatov	Fight Night Saint-Tropez	Saint Tropez, France	Decision (unanimous)	4	2:00
2015-06-05	Loss	(Tunisia) Mourad Bouzidi	Glory 22: Lille	Lille, France,	Decision (unanimous)	3	3:00
2014-08-04	Win	(France) Corentin Jallon	Fight Night Saint-Tropez II	Saint-Tropez, France	Decision	3	3:00
2014-06-21	Loss	(Russia) Artem Levin	Glory 17: Los Angeles - Middleweight Last Man Standing Tournament, Semi Finals	Inglewood, California, USA	Decision (unanimous)	3	3:00
2014-06-21	Win	(Netherlands) Melvin Manhoef	Glory 17: Los Angeles - Middleweight Last Man Standing Tournament, Quarter Finals	Inglewood, California, USA	Decision (majority)	3	3:00
2014-04-12	Win	(Nigeria) Israel Adesanya	Glory 15: Istanbul	Istanbul, Turkey	Decision (unanimous)	3	3:00
2013-10-12	Loss	(Brazil) Saulo Cavalari	Glory 11: Chicago - Heavyweight World Championship Tournament	Hoffman Estates, Illinois, USA	Decision (unanimous)	3	3:00
2013-06-22	Loss	(Suriname) Tyrone Spong	Glory 9: New York - 2013 95kg Slam, Semi Finals	New York City, New York, USA	Decision (unanimous)	3	3:00
2013-06-22	Win	(Australia) Steve McKinnon	Glory 9: New York - 2013 95kg Slam, Quarter Finals	New York City, New York, USA	Decision (split)	3	3:00
2013-04-06	Win	(Romania) Lucian Danilencu	Glory 6: Istanbul	Istanbul, Turkey	Decision (unanimous)	3	3:00
2012-12-31	Loss	(Netherlands) Remy Bonjasky	Glory 4: Tokyo - 2012 Heavyweight Grand Slam, First Round	Saitama, Japan	Decision (unanimous)	3	2:00
2012-10-06	Win	(Brazil) Fabiano Cyclone	Glory 2: Brussels	Brussels, Belgium	Decision (unanimous)	3	3:00
2012-06-30	Loss	(Democratic Republic of the Congo) Danyo Ilunga	Music Hall & BFN Group present: It's Showtime 57 & 58	Brussels, Belgium	Decision (split)	5	3:00
For the It's Showtime 95MAX (-95 kg/209 lb) Championship.
2012-01-00	Win	(France) Hicham Diop			TKO (leg injury)	4	0:31
2011-11-06	Win	(England) Chris Knowles	Muaythai Premier League: Blood and Steel	The Hague, Netherlands	Decision (unanimous)	3	3:00
2011-09-02	Win	(Germany) Martin Jahn	Muaythai Premier League: Stars and Stripes	Long Beach, California, USA	TKO (doctor stoppage)	1	3:00
2011-05-22	Win	(Guinea) Mamoudou Keta	Thaiboxinggala Putte	Putte, Belgium	TKO (cut)	1	1:51
2011-03-19	Win	(Belgium) Frédéric Sinistra	United Glory 13: 2010-2011 World Series Semifinals	Charleroi, Belgium	Decision (unanimous)	3	3:00
2010-10-16	Loss	(France) Brice Guidon	United Glory 12: 2010-2011 World Series Quarterfinals, Quarter Finals	Amsterdam, Netherlands	Decision (unanimous)	3	3:00
2010-08-29	Win	(Suriname) Redouan Cairo	Fighting with the Stars	Paramaribo, Suriname	Decision	3	3:00
	Loss	(Canada) Simon Marcus					
2009-03-18	Loss	(Netherlands) Rico Verhoeven	Fights at the Border presents: It's Showtime 2009	Antwerp, Belgium	Decision	3	3:00
2009-00-00	Win	Simon Aston		Switzerland			
Wins the WKA World Cruiserweight (-85.9 kg/189.4 lb) Championship.
2008-00-00	Win	(Poland) Marian Baryla		Belgium	Decision	5	3:00
Wins the WKA European Super Cruiserweight (-90 kg/198.4 lb) Muay Thai Championship.
2007-03-24	Win	(Netherlands) Karim el Baze	Fights At The Border	Lommel, Belgium	Decision	5	3:00
2005-10-01	Win	(Albania) Rustemi Kreshnik	Fight of the Gladiator 4	Belgium	Decision	5	2:00

Amateur kickboxing record
Date	Result	Opponent	Event	Location	Method	Round	Time
2010-12-	Win	(Denmark) Christian Colombo	2010 IFMA World Championships, Final	Bangkok, Thailand	Decision	4	2:00
Wins the 2010 IFMA World Championships +91 kg/200 lb Gold Medal.
2010-12-	Win	(Belarus) Alexei Kudin	2010 IFMA World Championships, Semi Finals	Bangkok, Thailand	Decision	4	2:00
2010-12-	Win	(Ukraine) Sergei Lascenko	2010 IFMA World Championships, Quarter Finals	Bangkok, Thailand	Decision	4	2:00
Legend: Win Loss Draw/No contest Notes
