= Jorge Loren =

Spanish kickboxer (born 1984)

Lorenzo Javier Jorge
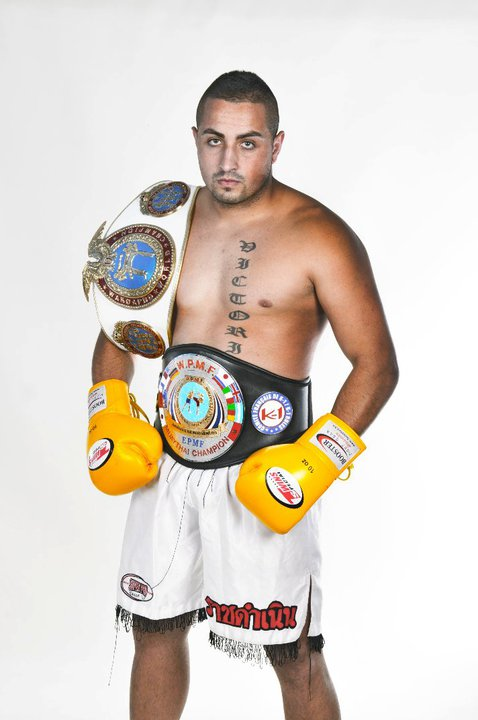
- Born: Lorenzo Javier Jorge; 2 July 1984 (age 42); Tacoronte, Spain
- Other names: Loren
- Height: 1.84 m (6 ft 1/2 in)
- Weight: 85–90 kg (187–198 lb; 13 st 5 lb – 14 st 2 lb)
- Division: Light-Heavyweight
- Style: Kickboxing
- Stance: Orthodox
- Fighting out of: Amsterdam, Netherlands
- Team: Team Loren; Super Pro; Golden Glory; Vos gym; Elite Training Center/Team Elite
- Trainer: Georges Karvelis; Dennis Krauweel; Ivan Hippolyte; Kamal Chabrani

Kickboxing record
- Total: 130
- Wins: 97
- By knockout: 43
- Losses: 28
- Draws: 4
- No contests: 1

Other information
- Notable relatives: Francis Javier Jorge – brother
- Last updated on: August 6, 2016

Lorenzo Javier Jorge (born 2 July 1984), also known as Jorge Loren, is a retired Spanish professional kickboxer and K-1 veteran. Loren was the Super Cruiserweight Champion of the Superkombat Fighting Championship. He is also the 2014 Superkombat World Grand Prix tournament champion and fought for the It's Showtime 95MAX world title, losing to Danyo Ilunga by decision after 5 rounds. He has also fought in Enfusion.

As of 1 August 2020, he was ranked the #4 middleweight in the world by Combat Press.

== Career ==
He had his first contact with martial arts as a child. His father was black belt and karate teacher and taught him first steps, also his brother followed him into martial arts.

After injuring his left arm in a fight against Mirko Cro Cop, Loren tried to return to winning ways against Ondřej Hutník for the WKA European title. The fight was scheduled for five three minutes rounds in Prague. Loren lost the fight after five rounds by unanimous decision.

He was scheduled to fight Luis Morais on 13 April 2013 in the K-1 World Qualification – K-1 World MAX Elimination super fight but was pulled out because of K-1 financial problems.

On 3 August 2013 he fought Rustam Guseinov for Katana Fighting World Cruiserweight Title. After three rounds, of Loren's dominance in the ring, judges declared that Guseinov is winner by split decision witch resulted in public outcry. The fight was then declared as no contest, but later an independent review committee was set up to re-judge the decision. The committee, composed of Ernesto Hoost, Andre Mannaart and other high level of the sport, declared Loren as fight winner and he became Katana Fighting world cruiserweight champion.

He lost to Igor Bugaenko by unanimous decision the SuperKombat World Grand Prix 2013 Final Elimination in Ploiesti, Romania on 9 November 2013 in a SuperKombat Cruiserweight title eliminator.

Jorge fought Damian Garcia at Enfusion Live 20 on 12 July 2014.

== Titles ==
- 2015 World Kickboxing Network Diamond Super Cruiserweight Title
- 2015 Superkombat Cruiserweight Championship -95 kg/209 lb
- 2015 WFL -95 kg Tournament Championship Runner Up
- 2015 K-1 Event Grand Prix 2015 Tournament Champion -96 kg
- 2014 Superkombat Special Prize
- 2014 Superkombat Fighter of the Year nomination
- 2014 Superkombat World Grand Prix 2014 Tournament Champion
- 2013 Katana Fighting World Cruiserweight Title
- 2013 WCSF European K1 Champion -95 kg
- 2013 Troyes Trophy Heavyweight – 8 Men Tournament champion
- 2010 W.A.K.O Pro World Champion in Low Kick 94.1 kg
- 2010 W.P.M.F European Heavyweight Champion
- 2008 W.A.K.O Pro World Champion
- I.S.K.A. European Champion -82 kg
- 3 times Spanish Professional Champion
- Spanish Semi-Professional Champion
- Spanish Amateur Champion

== Kickboxing record ==
kickboxing record 97 wins (48ko) – 28 losses
Date	Result	Opponent	Event	Location	Method	Round	Time
2019-07-06	Win	(Belgium) Younes Benmalek	Real Fighters	Melilla, Spain	Decision	3	3:00
2019-03-30	Win	(Democratic Republic of the Congo) Ulric Bokeme	Enfusion 81	Tenerife, Spain	KO	1	0:20
2018-12-07	Win	(Morocco) Khalid El Bakouri	Enfusion Live 77	United Arab Emirates	Decision (Unanimous)	3	3:00
2018-05-19	Win	(France) Grégori Grossi	Cavalaire Kickboxing Show 3	France	KO	2	
2018-05-5	Win	(Morocco) Ibrahim El Boustati	Enfusion	France	KO	1	
2018-03-10	Win	(China) Hao Guanghua	Wu Lin Feng 2018: -60kg World Championship Tournament	Jiaozuo, China	Decision (Unanimous)	3	3:00
2017-11-18	Win	(France) Mehdi Bouanane	Enfusion Live 56, League R. 2	Groningen, Netherlands	Decision	3	3:00
2017-09-16	Win	(Belgium) Filip Verlinden	Enfusion Live 52, League R. 1	Zwolle, Netherlands	Decision	3	3:00
2016-10-15	Loss	(Netherlands) Fabio Kwasi	Campionato Del Mundo Profesional	Santa Cruz de Tenerife, Spain	TKO (Arm Injury)	1	
2016-08-06	Loss	(Romania) Ionuț Iftimoaie	Superkombat World Grand Prix IV 2016	Comănești, Romania	Decision (unanimous)	3	3:00
Loses the Superkombat Super Cruiserweight Championship & the World Kickboxing Network Diamond Super Cruiserweight Title.
2016-06-04	Win	(Latvia) Artur Gorlov	Enfusion Live 40	Gran Canaria, Spain	Decision	3	3:00
2016-02-13	Win	(Spain) David Trallero	IFC 4	Barcelona, Spain	Decision	3	3:00
2015-12-19	Loss	(Russia) Artem Vakhitov	Muay Thai Moscow	Moscow, Russia	KO (Straight Left)	2	
2015-11-07	Win	(Romania) Andrei Stoica	Superkombat World Grand Prix 2015 Final	Bucharest, Romania	TKO (3 knockdowns)	1	
Wins the Superkombat Super Cruiserweight Championship & the vacant World Kickboxing Network Diamond Super Cruiserweight Title.
2015-10-18	Loss	(Cape Verde) Luis Tavares	WFL "Unfinished Business", Final	Hoofddorp, Netherlands	Ext. R. Decision	3	3:00
For the WFL -95 kg Tournament Title.
2015-10-18	Win	(Suriname) Redouan Cairo	WFL "Unfinished Business", Semi Finals	Hoofddorp, Netherlands	Decision	3	3:00
2015-04-19	Loss	(Suriname) Redouan Cairo	The Best of all Elements	Almere, Netherlands	KO (Left hook)	3	
2015-02-21	Win	(France) Pacôme Assi	K-1 Events 7, Final	Troyes, France	KO	1	
Wins K-1 Event Grand Prix 2015 Tournament Title -96 kg.
2015-02-21	Win	(France) Emmanuel Payet	K-1 Events 7, Semi Finals	Troyes, France	TKO (Injury)	2	
2014-11-22	Win	(France) Aristote Quitusisa	Superkombat World Grand Prix 2014 Final, Final	Monza, Italy	Decision (Unanimous)	3	3:00
Wins 2014 Superkombat World Grand Prix Tournament Title.
2014-11-22	Win	(United Kingdom) Michael Terrill	Superkombat World Grand Prix 2014 Final, Semi Finals	Monza, Italy	KO (Right Middle Kick)	2	1:25
2014-10-25	Win	(Switzerland) Beni Osmanoski	Superkombat World Grand Prix 2014 Final Elimination, Quarter Finals	Geneva, Switzerland	Decision (Majority)	3	3:00
2014-07-12	Win	(Spain) Damian Garcia	Enfusion Live 20	Majorca, Spain	Decision (Unanimous)	3	3:00
2014-03-29	Win	(Romania) Bogdan Stoica	Superkombat New Heroes 7	Ploiești, Romania	Decision (Unanimous)	3	3:00
2013-12-21	Loss	(Russia) Alexander Vezhevatov	Cup of Champions 2013	Novosibirsk, Russia	Ext. R. Decision (Split)	4	3:00
2013-11-09	Loss	(Belarus) Igor Bugaenko	Superkombat World Grand Prix 2013 Final Elimination	Ploiești, Romania	Decision (Unanimous)	3	3:00
Superkombat Cruiserweight Title Eliminator.
2013-08-03	Win	(Scotland) Rustam Guseinov	KATANA 8 SUPERNOVA	Edinburgh, Scotland	Official Inquiry	3	3:00
For Katana Fighting world cruiserweight title.
2013-06-08	Loss	(France) Stéphane Susperregui	K-1 EVENT 5	Troyes, France	TKO	2	
For WKA K-1 rules World Heavyweight title -95 kg.
2013-03-31	Win	(Belgium) Mamoudou Keta	Fight Time	Schaerbeek, Belgium	Decision	5	3:00
Wins WCSF European K1 Championship -95 kg.
2013-02-16	Win	(France) Pacome Assi	K-1 EVENT 4, Final	Troyes, France	Decision (Unanimous)	3	3:00
Wins Troyes Trophy Heavyweight – 8 Men Tournament title +91 kg.
2013-02-16	Win	(France) Gaétan Sautron	K-1 EVENT 4, Semi Finals	Troyes, France	Decision (Unanimous)	3	3:00
2013-02-16	Win	(France) Cedric Ameline	K-1 EVENT 4, Quarter Finals	Troyes, France	KO	2	
2012-12-30	Loss	(Czech Republic) Ondřej Hutník		Prague, Czech Republic	Decision (Unanimous)	5	3:00
For W.F.C.A. European Heavyweight -95 kg title.
2012-05-27	Loss	(Croatia) Mirko Cro Cop	K-1 World MAX 2012 World Championship Tournament Final 16, Super Fight	Madrid, Spain	KO (Left Uppercut)	2	2:23
2012-04-14	Win	(Portugal) Vando Cabral	Trofeo Booster	Torrelavega, Spain	Decision	3	3:00
2011-11-12	Loss	(Democratic Republic of the Congo) Danyo Ilunga	Street Culture, Fight Club Group & Canary Kickboxing Federation presents: It's Showtime 53	Tenerife, Spain	Decision (Unanimous)	5	3:00
Fight was for It's Showtime 95MAX World title.
2011-10-08	Win	(Netherlands) Rodney Glunder	Top Event	Tenerife, Spain	Decision	3	3:00
2011-06-18	Loss	(Suriname) Tyrone Spong	Fix Events & Fightclub Group presents: It's Showtime 2011	Madrid, Spain	Decision (Unanimous)	3	3:00
2011-01-07	Win	(Algeria) Zinedine Hameur-Lain	Fight in Spirit	Épernay, France	Decision	3	3:00
2010-12-12	Draw	(Spain) César Córdoba		Santa Cruz de Tenerife, Spain	Decision (Draw)	3	3:00
2010-11-06	Win	(Turkey) Timur Haspolat	The Best	Breda, Netherlands	KO (Spinning Heel Kick)	3	
2010-06-04	Win	(France) Massinissa Hamaili	Muaythaitv Trophy et Ultimate Thai 5	Paris, France	Decision	3	3:00
2010-05-15	Win	(Russia) Dmitry Antonenko		Namur, Belgium			
Wins WAKO Pro low kick rules cruiser heavyweight world title -94.100 kg.
2010-04-03	Win	(France) Massinissa Hamaili	K-1 Events	Troyes, France	Decision	5	3:00
Wins W.P.M.F European Heavyweight Championship.
2009-07-04	Win	(Portugal) Humberto Evora	K-1 MAX Canarias 2009	Santa Cruz de Tenerife, Canary Islands	Decision (Unanimous)	3	3:00
2009-01-26	Loss	(France) Sidi Kone	Diamond Fight World Tour	Paris, France	Decision	5	2:00
2007-11-05	Win	(Greece) Georges Mavidis		Santa Cruz de Tenerife, Canary Islands	TKO	7	
Wins ISKA European Championship -82 kg.
2006-11-19	Loss	(Netherlands) Sem Braan	K-1 MAX Canarias 2006, Semi Finals	Santa Cruz de Tenerife, Spain	Ext. R. TKO (Low Kicks)	4	
2006-11-19	Win	(Netherlands) Henry Akdeniz	K-1 MAX Canarias 2006, Quarter Finals	Santa Cruz de Tenerife, Spain	Decision	3	3:00
2005-04-11	Win	(Poland) Tomasz Sarara	Fight for Delight	Almelo, Netherlands	Decision (Unanimous)	3	3:00
2005-04-02	Win	(Spain) Miguel Bello	K-1 Canarias 2005, Super Fight	Tenerife, Spain	TKO	3	
Legend: Win Loss Draw/No contest Notes

== See also ==
- List of K-1 events
- List of It's Showtime events
- List of male kickboxers
