= Serkan Ozcaglayan =

Turkish-Dutch kickboxer

- Born: 8 May 1994 (age 32); The Hague, The Netherlands
- Height: 1.91 m (6 ft 3 in)
- Weight: 84 kg (185 lb; 13.2 st)
- Division: Middleweight; Heavyweight
- Reach: 194 cm (76 in)
- Style: Kickboxing
- Fighting out of: Amsterdam, Netherlands
- Team: Mike's Gym (2022-Present); SB Gym (former); Dragon GYM Den Haag (former)

Kickboxing record
- Total: 63
- Wins: 49
- By knockout: 36
- Losses: 14

Other information
- Notable relatives: Gökhan Saki (cousin)

Serkan Özçağlayan (born 8 May 1994) is a Turkish-Dutch kickboxer, currently signed with Glory. He is a cousin of Gokhan Saki.

He is ranked as the third best middleweight in the world by Combat Press as of September 2022, and third best by Beyond Kickboxing as of October 2022.

== Kickboxing career ==
=== Early career ===
On 13 March 2014 Ozcaglayan face Ayou Ababakre for the Benelux Heavyweight title. He lost the fight by decision.

On 29 October 2017 Ozcaglayan faced Fabio Kwasi at WFL: Manhoef vs. Bonjasky. He lost the fight by TKO in the second round.

Ozcaglayan was scheduled to face Bogdan Stoica at Enfusion #73 for the Heavyweight title. He withdrew from the fight.

On 6 September 2019 Ozcaglayan faced Pavel Zablockiy in the main event of a Tatneft Cup event in Kazan, Russia. He won the fight by first round knockout.

Ozcaglayan for the first 38 fights of his career competed at heavyweight, he weighed up to 130 kg before dropping all the way down to middleweight.

=== GLORY ===
Ozcaglayan made his debut for the Glory promotion at Glory Collision 3 Final against Matt Baker. He won the fight by technical knockout in the first minute of the fight. He’s match with win in Knockout lasted 00:58 seconds is chosen the best ranked fight of the year in Glory. This quick victory earned him the 2021 Glory Debut of the Year award.

Ozcaglayan was booked to face the #1 ranked Glory middleweight contender Ertugrul Bayrak Glory 80 on 19 March 2022. He won the fight by decision, after which he earned the #1 ranking in the Glory middleweight division.

Ozcaglayan faced César Almeida at Glory: Collision 4 on 8 October 2022. He lost the fight by unanimous decision. after suffering two knockdowns, one each in the first and second round.

Ozcaglayan faced Juri De Sousa at Glory 82 on 19 November 2022. He won the fight by a three-round technical knockout, after knocking De Sousa down for the fourth time in the fight.

Ozcaglayan faced Sergej Braun at Glory 83 on 11 February 2023. He won the fight by a fourth-round knockout.

Ozcaglayan challenged Donovan Wisse for the Glory Middleweight Championship at Glory: Collision 5 on 17 June 2023. He lost the fight by unanimous decision.

Ozcaglayan faced Michael Boapeah at Glory 92 on 18 May 2024. He lost the fight by unanimous decision.

Ozcaglayan faced Jente Nnamadim at Glory 94 on 31 August 2024. He won the fight by unanimous decision.

Ozcaglayan faced Ramy Deghir at Glory Collision 7 on 7 December 2024. He won the fight by unanimous decision.

Ozcaglayan faced Mohamed Touchassie at Glory 100 on 14 June 2025.

== Championships and accomplishments ==
- Glory
  - 2021 Glory "Debut of the Year"

== Kickboxing record ==
Kickboxing record
49 Wins (36 (T)KO's), 14 Losses
| Date | Result | Opponent | Event | Location | Method | Round | Time |
| 2027-02-06 | | (Republic of Ireland) Joshua Akingbade | Glory 111 | Rotterdam, Netherlands | | | |
| 2026-12-05 | | (Iran) Karoo Gijahi | Mix Fight Championship 56 | Frankfurt, Germany | | | |
For the vacant MFC Middleweight (-85 kg) title.
| 2026-06-13 | Loss | (Netherlands) Jimmy Livinus | Glory Collision 9 - Light Heavyweight Grand Prix, reserve | Rotterdam, Netherlands | Decision (Unanimous) | 3 | 3:00 |
| 2025-12-26 | Win | (France) Aristote Quitusisa | Army of Fighters 5 | Istanbul, Turkey | Decision (Unanimous) | 3 | 3:00 |
| 2025-12-06 | Win | (Iran) Karoo Gijahi | Mix Fight Championship 53 | Frankfurt, Germany | Decision (Majority) | 3 | 3:00 |
| 2025-06-14 | Loss | (Morocco) Mohamed Touchassie | Glory 100 | Rotterdam, Netherlands | Decision (Unanimous) | 3 | 3:00 |
| 2024-12-07 | Win | (France) Ramy Deghir | Glory Collision 7 | Arnhem, Netherlands | Decision (Unanimous) | 3 | 3:00 |
| 2024-08-31 | Win | (Belgium) Jente Nnamadim | Glory 94 | Antwerp, Belgium | Decision (Unanimous) | 3 | 3:00 |
| 2024-05-18 | Loss | (Ghana) Michael Boapeah | Glory 92 | Rotterdam, Netherlands | Decision (Unanimous) | 3 | 3:00 |
| 2023-11-04 | Loss | (Democratic Republic of the Congo) Ulric Bokeme | Glory: Collision 6 | Arnhem, Netherlands | Decision (Unanimous) | 3 | 3:00 |
| 2023-06-17 | Loss | (Suriname) Donovan Wisse | Glory: Collision 5 | Rotterdam, Netherlands | Decision (Unanimous) | 5 | 3:00 |
For the Glory Middleweight Championship.
| 2023-02-11 | Win | (Germany) Sergej Braun | Glory 83 | Essen, Germany | KO (Left hook) | 2 | 2:40 |
| 2022-11-19 | Win | (Portugal) Juri De Sousa | Glory 82 | Bonn, Germany | TKO (4 Knockdowns) | 3 | 2:19 |
| 2022-10-08 | Loss | (Brazil) César Almeida | Glory: Collision 4 | Arnhem, Netherlands | Decision (Unanimous) | 3 | 3:00 |
| 2022-03-19 | Win | (Turkey) Ertugrul Bayrak | Glory 80 | Hasselt, Belgium | Decision (Unanimous) | 3 | 3:00 |
| 2021-10-23 | Win | (United States) Matt Baker | Glory Collision 3 | Arnhem, Netherlands | TKO (Punches) | 1 | 0:58 |
| 2019-08-30 | Win | (Portugal) Bruno Susano | Pitbull Promotion | Istanbul, Turkey | Ext.R Decision | 4 | 3:00 |
| 2019-07-21 | Win | (Curaçao) Wendell Roche | Pitbull Promotion | Istanbul, Turkey | TKO (Doctor stoppage) | 1 | |
| 2018-05-05 | Loss | (Morocco) Samir Boukhidis | A1 World Combat Cup | Hasselt, Belgium | Disqualification | 2 | |
| 2017-10-29 | Loss | (Netherlands) Fabio Kwasi | WFL: Manhoef vs. Bonjasky, Final 16 | Almere, Netherlands | TKO (3 knockdowns) | 2 | |
| 2017-05-31 | Win | (France) Michael Yapi | Tatneft Cup | Kazan, Russia | Ext.R KO (Punches) | 4 | 1:10 |
| 2017-04-29 | Loss | (Netherlands) Levi Rigters | Enfusion Live x Fightsense | Zoetermeer, Netherlands | Decision (Unanimous) | 3 | 3:00 |
| 2017-01-07 | Win | (Austria) Dritan Bajramaj | World Kickboxing Champions Night 2 | Istanbul, Turkey | KO (Right hook) | 2 | 1:00 |
| 2016-09-06 | Win | (Russia) Pavel Zablockiy | Tatneft Cup | Kazan, Russia | KO | 1 | |
| 2016-04-23 | Loss | (Slovakia) Radovan Kulla | World Kickboxing Champions Night | Istanbul, Turkey | Decision | 3 | 3:00 |
| 2016-04-02 | Loss | (Netherlands) Fikri Ameziane | Enfusion Live Gold Edition | The Hague, Netherlands | Ext.R Decision | 4 | 3:00 |
| 2016-03-05 | Loss | (Germany) André Schmeling | Ypenburg Fightday 8 | The Hague, Netherlands | Decision | 3 | 3:00 |
| 2016-01-24 | Win | (Georgia (country)) Shota Dolidze | No Guts No Glory 9 | Hellevoetsluis, Netherlands | Decision | 3 | 3:00 |
| 2015-11-28 | Win | (Germany) Andre Langen | Fightsense | The Hague, Netherlands | TKO | 1 | |
| 2014-11-30 | Win | (Netherlands) Tony Jas | Fightsense | The Hague, Netherlands | KO | 1 | |
Wins the Dutch Heavyweight title.
| 2014-06-07 | Win | (Netherlands) Joey Kaptljn | Fightsense | The Hague, Netherlands | | | |
| 2014- | Win | (Netherlands) Rodney Immers | | The Hague, Netherlands | KO (Punches) | 1 | |
| 2014-03-13 | Loss | (Belgium) Ayoub Ababakre | Force et Honneur | Anderlecht, Belgium | Decision | 5 | 3:00 |
For the Benelux K-1 Heavyweight title.
| 2014-02-08 | Loss | (Netherlands) Jamil Meeusen | Fight Fans 8 | Amsterdam, Netherlands | TKO (Doctor stoppage) | 2 | 3:00 |
Legend: Win Loss Draw/No contest Notes

== See also ==
- List of male kickboxers
