= Khalid El Bakouri =

Dutch male professional kickboxer

- Born: 12 April 1994 (age 32); Venlo, Netherlands
- Other names: The Twin
- Nationality: Dutch
- Height: 1.88 m (6 ft 2 in)
- Weight: 85 kg (187 lb; 13 st 5 lb)
- Division: Middleweight
- Style: Kickboxing
- Fighting out of: Venlo, Netherlands
- Team: Bodystyle Venlo
- Years active: 2013 - present

Kickboxing record
- Total: 54
- Wins: 44
- By knockout: 19
- Losses: 10

Khalid El Bakouri (born 12 April 1994) is a Dutch-Moroccan kickboxer, currently competing in the middleweight division of Enfusion. He is the current Enfusion Middleweight Champion.

As of September 2021, Combat Press ranks him as the #10 middleweight in the world.

== Kickboxing career ==
El Bakouri was scheduled to fight Cédric Tousch at King Of The Ring 5 on April 9, 2016. He lost the fight by unanimous decision.

El Bakouri was scheduled to fight Martin Reemeijer at Enfusion Talents 62 on November 17, 2018. He won the fight by unanimous decision.

El Bakouri was scheduled to face Jorge Loren at Enfusion 77 on December 7, 2018. Loren won the fight by unanimous decision.

El Bakouri rebounded from this loss by notching two consecutive victories. He first won a unanimous decision against Soufyan Assa at Enfusion 78 on February 23, 2019. This was followed by a third-round technical knockout of Edwin Martirosian at Enfusion Talents 71 on June 8, 2019.

El Bakouri was scheduled to fight Anis Bouzid for the vacant Enfusion -84 kg title at Enfusion 87 on September 7, 2019. El Bakouri won the fight by unanimous decision.

El Bakouri was scheduled to face the reigning -95 kg champion Ibrahim El Boustati in a non-title bout at Enfusion 95 on September 29, 2020. He won the fight by a first-round knockout.

== Championships and accomplishments ==
- Enfusion
  - 2019 Enfusion Middleweight (-84 kg) World Championship
  - 2022 Enfusion Middleweight (-84 kg) Tournament winner

== Kickboxing record ==
Professional kickboxing record
44 wins (19 (T)KOs), 10 losses, 0 draws, 0 no contests
Date	Result	Opponent	Event	Location	Method	Round	Time
2022-10-22	Win	(Netherlands) Kevin van Heeckeren	Enfusion 113, Tournament Finals	Wuppertal, Germany	Decision (unanimous)	3	3:00
Won the Enfusion Middleweight (-84 kg) Tournament title.
2022-06-05	Win	(Greece) Vangelis Tzotzis	Enfusion 107, Tournament Semifinals	Darmstadt, Germany	TKO (cut)	2	
2021-11-12	Loss	(Iran) Mohammad Ghaedibardeh	Enfusion 104	Abu Dhabi, United Arab Emirates	Decision	5	3:00
Lost the Enfusion Middleweight (-85 kg) title.
2020-09-29	Win	(Netherlands) Ibrahim El Boustati	Enfusion 95	Eindhoven, Netherlands	KO	1	
2019-09-07	Win	(Morocco) Anis Bouzid	Enfusion 87	Darmstadt, Germany	Decision (unanimous)	5	3:00
Wins the vacant Enfusion Middleweight (-84 kg) title.
2019-06-08	Win	(Armenia) Edwin Martirosian	Enfusion Talents 71	Groningen, Netherlands	TKO (three knockdowns)	3	
2019-02-23	Win	(Morocco) Soufyan Assa	Enfusion 78	Eindhoven, Netherlands	Decision (unanimous)	3	3:00
2018-12-07	Loss	(Spain) Jorge Loren	Enfusion 77	United Arab Emirates	Decision (unanimous)	3	3:00
2018-11-17	Win	(Netherlands) Martin Reemeijer	Enfusion Talents 62	Groningen, Netherlands	Decision (unanimous)	3	3:00
2018-05-05	Loss	(Switzerland) Ulric Bokeme	Enfusion Live 66	Tenerife, Spain	Decision (unanimous)	3	3:00
2017-11-05	Loss	(Morocco) Anis Bouzid	MTK Fight Night 2	Belgium	Decision (unanimous)	3	3:00
For the WFFC Europe -86kg title.
2017-09-16	Win	(Netherlands) Robin Ciric	Enfusion Talents #36	Groningen, Netherlands	KO	2	
2017-04-29	Loss	(Morocco) Reda Zaidi	Enfusion Talents 31	The Hague, Netherlands	Decision (unanimous)	3	3:00
2017-02-18	Loss	(Germany) Nick Morsink	Enfusion Talents 28	Eindhoven, Spain	Decision (unanimous)	3	3:00
2016-11-20	Win	(Netherlands) Erwin vd Beld	Enfusion 56	Groningen, Netherlands	Decision (unanimous)	3	3:00
2016-06-28	Win	(Curaçao) Lutciano Zimmerman	Enfusion Talents 14	Gent, Belgium	Decision (unanimous)	3	3:00
2016-04-09	Loss	(France) Cédric Tousch	King Of The Ring 5	Longeville-lès-Metz, France	Decision (unanimous)	3	3:00
2016-02-07	Loss	(Turkey) Ertugrul Bayrak	Enfusion 36	Eindhoven, Netherlands	Decision (unanimous)	3	3:00
2015-11-21	Win	(Morocco) Mohamed Kabiri	Glorious Heroes in Groningen	Groningen, Netherlands	KO (right hook)	2	
2015-04-19	Win	(Netherlands) Ibrahim El Bouni	The Best of all Elements	Almere, Netherlands	Decision	3	3:00
2015-02-07	Win	(Poland) Kamil Jenel	Enfusion 24	Eindhoven, Netherlands	Ext. R. decision	4	3:00
2014-12-21	Loss	(Morocco) Ibrahim El Boustati	Enfusion Live 23	Antwerp, Belgium	Decision (unanimous)	3	3:00
2014-11-23	Win	(Curaçao) Alva Remor	Enfusion 22	Groningen, Netherlands	Decision (unanimous)	3	3:00
2014-11-15	Win	(Estonia) Rain Kärkinen	XPLOSION 2014	Tallinn, Estonia	Decision (unanimous)	3	3:00
2014-09-20	Loss	(Morocco) Hicham El Gaoui	A1 World Combat Cup - Final 8, Super Fight (82 kg)	Eindhoven, Netherlands	Decision	3	3:00
2014-04-21	Win	(Netherlands) Iwna Pang	Quinn Gym Fight Night 2	Venray, Netherlands	KO (right hook)	2	
2014-03-07	Win	(Turkey) Muzaffer Gemici	?	Turkey	Decision (unanimous)	3	3:00
2013-11-16	Win	(Curaçao) Kenneth Susanna	Quinn Gym Fight Night	Venray, Netherlands	KO (right hook)	1	
2013-05-23	Win	(Netherlands) Randy Momoh	Glorious Heroes Presents Enfusion IV	Annen, Netherlands	Ext. R decision (unanimous)	4	3:00
Legend: Win Loss Draw/no contest Notes

== See also ==
- List of male kickboxers
