= UFC 334 =

Mixed martial arts event in 2026

UFC 334: Gane vs. Hokit
- The poster for UFC 334: Gane vs. Hokit
- Promotion: Ultimate Fighting Championship
- Date: November 14, 2026
- Venue: Madison Square Garden
- City: New York City, New York, United States
- Attendance: 19,740
- Total gate: $10,345,506

Event chronology
UFC Fight Night: Cortes-Acosta vs. Walker	UFC 334: Gane vs. Hokit	UFC Fight Night: Procházka vs. Stirling

UFC 334: Gane vs. Hokit (branded as Polymarket UFC 334 for sponsorship reasons) was a mixed martial arts event produced by the Ultimate Fighting Championship that took place on November 14, 2026, at Madison Square Garden in New York City, New York, United States.

== Background ==
This event marked the promotion's 13th visit to New York City and first since UFC 322 in November 2025.

A UFC Heavyweight Championship bout between current champion Ciryl Gane and undefeated contender Josh Hokit headlined the event. On September 14, 2026, then-reigning champion Tom Aspinall vacated his heavyweight title due to ongoing complications from the eye injury he sustained via an illegal poke during his title defense against Gane in October 2025 at UFC 321, which ended in a no contest. Gane was originally the interim champion after defeating former UFC Middleweight and two-time UFC Light Heavyweight champion Alex Pereira on June 14, 2026 at UFC Freedom 250. Although CEO Dana White originally said Gane would not be elevated to undisputed champion, White later clarified that he misspoke and confirmed that Gane had indeed been promoted and would enter this bout as the defending champion.

A UFC Women's Bantamweight Championship bout between the reigning champion Kayla Harrison (who is also a 2012 and 2016 Olympic gold medalist in judo; and a two-time PFL women's lightweight tournament champion) and former two-time champion Amanda Nunes, who also held the UFC Women's Featherweight Championship, co-headlined the event. Nunes, who is widely considered the greatest women's fighter in UFC history, returned for her first bout since UFC 289 in June 2023, where she announced her retirement following a successful title defense against Irene Aldana. The bout was originally scheduled for UFC 324 in January 2026, but Harrison withdrew from the bout after being diagnosed with herniated discs in her neck, which required surgery. The bout was also reportedly linked to UFC 331, which took place in September, but it did not materialize for undisclosed reasons. Joselyne Edwards served as backup and potential replacement for this fight.

Undefeated prospects Donte Johnson and Baisangur Susurkaev were scheduled to fight at the event in a middleweight bout. However, Susurkaev withdrew from the bout for unknown reasons and was replaced by César Almeida in a catchweight of 190 pounds. Almeida was fined 30 percent of his purse for asking for the bout to be moved to a catchweight bout.

A lightweight bout between Nazim Sadykhov and Jefferson Nascimento was scheduled for the event. However, Nascimento withdrew due to an injury, and Sadykhov subsequently withdrew due to a lingering injury of his own, resulting in the bout's cancellation.

Adrian Yañez and Juan Díaz were expected to meet in a bantamweight bout at the preliminary card. However, Yañez had to withdraw in mid October due to injury and was replaced by Alateng Heili.

At the weigh-ins, two fighters missed weight:

- Terrance McKinney weighed in at 160.2 pounds, 4.2 pounds over the lightweight non-title fight limit.
- Díaz weighed in at 136.4 pounds, 0.4 pounds over the bantamweight non-title fight limit.

Both bouts proceeded at catchweight. The fighters were fined a percentage of their individual purses which went to their opponents Jim Miller (30 percent) and Alateng (20 percent), respectively.

== Results ==
Main card (Paramount+)
Weight class				Method	Round	Time	Notes
Heavyweight	Ciryl Gane (c)	def.	Josh Hokit	Decision (unanimous) (48–47, 48–47, 48–47)	5	5:00	(Note: For the UFC Heavyweight Championship.)
Women's Bantamweight	Kayla Harrison (c)	def.	Amanda Nunes	Submission (rear-naked choke)	4	1:29	(Note: For the UFC Women's Bantamweight Championship.)
Middleweight	Caio Borralho	def.	Yousri Belgaroui	Decision (unanimous) (30–27, 30–27, 30–27)	3	5:00
Welterweight	Uroš Medić	vs.	Kevin Holland	Draw (majority) (29–27, 28–28, 28–28)	3	5:00	(Note: Medić was deducted one point in round 2 due to repeated groin strikes.)
Flyweight	Luis Gurule	def.	Bilal Hasan	Decision (split) (29–28, 29–28, 28–29)	3	5:00
Preliminary card (Paramount+)
Welterweight	Stephen Thompson	def.	Charles Radtke	TKO (spinning wheel kick)	3	2:54
Lightweight	Chris Duncan	def.	Drew Dober	Decision (unanimous) (30–27, 30–27, 29–28)	3	5:00
Catchweight (160.2 lb)	Terrance McKinney	def.	Jim Miller	TKO (punches)	1	1:53
Catchweight (190 lb)	César Almeida	def.	Donte Johnson	TKO (punches)	1	3:20
Early preliminary card (Paramount+)
Lightweight	Melquizael Costa	def.	Jared Gordon	Decision (unanimous) (29–28, 29–28, 29–28)	3	5:00
Women's Bantamweight	Beatriz Mesquita	def.	Macy Chiasson	Submission (rear-naked choke)	1	3:23
Catchweight (136.4 lb)	Juan Díaz	def.	Alateng Heili	Decision (unanimous) (30–27, 30–27, 30–27)	3	5:00
Lightweight	Evan Elder	def.	Samuel Sanches	Decision (unanimous) (30–26, 30–26, 30–26)	3	5:00	(Note: Sanches was deducted one point in round 3 due to repeated grabbing the fence.)

== Bonus awards ==
The following fighters received $100,000 bonuses. Mesquita received $25,000 for her finish. Almeida and McKinney also achieved finishes in their respective fights but were ineligible for bonuses due to missing weight.

- Fight of the Night: Ciryl Gane vs. Josh Hokit
- Performance of the Night: Kayla Harrison and Stephen Thompson

== See also ==
- 2026 in UFC
- List of current UFC fighters
- List of UFC events
