= Fighting Nerds =

Martial arts gym in São Paulo, Brazil

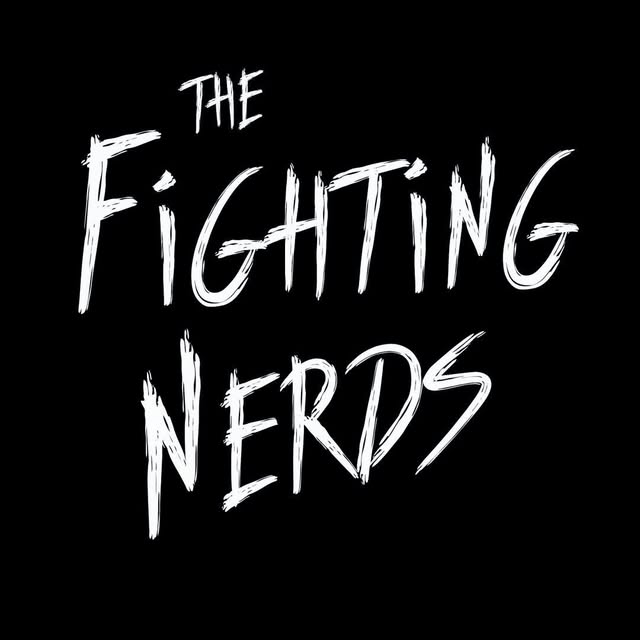
- Est.: 2014; 11 years ago
- Founded by: Caio Borralho; Pablo Sucupira
- Primary trainers: Pablo Sucupira; Wagner Mota; Flavio Alvaro
- Training facilities: São Paulo, Brazil

Fighting Nerds (formally Combat Club São Paulo) is a mixed martial arts (MMA) team and gym headquartered in São Paulo, Brazil. Its fighters and cornermen are known for their signature glasses, which are typically taped together in the center.

== Background ==
Fighting Nerds was founded in 2014 by Caio Borralho and his coach Pablo Sucupira. Borralho was originally a grappler and met with Sucupira to train him in striking. Sucupira noted that Borralho like him, preferred to take a data-driven, analytical approach to fighting. The two built the gym including painting the walls, installing the ring etc.

The team slowly expanded with Demian Maia's grappling coach, Wagner Mota and Brazilian veteran fighter, Flavio Alvaro joining it. Alvaro was initially hesitant and wanted a lot of money but after going to the gym and speaking with the fighters, he said he would ask for money after they became big stars.

The team's founders refused trying to fabricate faux street cred and did not deny their nerd background. Borralho loved school and tutored math and chemistry to peers. Sucupira worked a desk job as a copywriter in a marketing agency before quitting because his peers said his ideas were too wild. This led to the team being called Fighting Nerds. The Fighting Nerds' branding is most known by its signature lens-less black plastic glasses with tape over the nose that its fighters, cornermen and even occasionally in-cage interviewers like Joe Rogan and Daniel Cormier wear. The UFC which is very restrictive against props approved the glasses after Sucupira convinced them it was just a logo of the team. The glasses are meant to show that fighters are smart since they can think in a situation when nobody can think such as cage fighting. Borralho said the best thing about the glasses is how it's shown them how much they are respected across the globe after years being ridiculed for their name and appearance on the Brazilian regional scene. Sucupira buys hundreds of pairs of them at a time.

Sucupira's coaching methodology is that fighting is a problem needing to be solved and that one should fight smarter, not tougher. Formulating gameplans specific to individual opponents plays an important part. According to Borralho, the team's goals are to change people's perceptions about fighters and give encouragement to nerds that they can do anything they put their minds to. The team offers English and public speaking classes and its members get together to study fights and moves.

In 2021, Fighting Nerds made a breakthrough after Borralho received an offer to compete for a UFC contract on Dana White's Contender Series. After two fights, Borralho won a contract.

In March 2025, Maurício Ruffy revealed that Fighting Nerds would be expanding to the United States by opening a branch in New Hampshire.

== Notable fighters ==
- Caio Borralho
- Carlos Prates
- Jean Silva
- Maurício Ruffy
- Thiago Moisés
- Bruna Brasil
- Michał Oleksiejczuk

== Awards ==
World MMA Awards

- 2024 Gym of the Year

MMA Junkie

- 2024 Gym of the Year

== See also ==
- List of professional MMA training camps
