= Ertuğrul Bayrak =

Turkish-Dutch kickboxer

- Born: Ertuğrul Bayrak; June 17, 1992 (age 34); Zeist, Netherlands
- Nationality: Turkish, Dutch
- Height: 1.85 m (6 ft 1 in)
- Weight: 86 kg (190 lb; 13.5 st)
- Division: Middleweight
- Style: Kickboxing
- Fighting out of: Amersfoort, Netherlands
- Team: El Otmani gym
- Trainer: Nourdin El Otmani
- Years active: 2012 - present

Kickboxing record
- Total: 27
- Wins: 17
- By knockout: 5
- Losses: 10
- By knockout: 4
- Draws: 0

Ertuğrul Bayrak (born June 17, 1992) is a Turkish-Dutch kickboxer, currently signed with Glory, where he was formerly the #1 ranked middleweight.

He was ranked as the sixth best middleweight in the world by Beyond Kickboxing, as of October 2022. He was ranked in the Combat Press middleweight top ten between March 2019 and July 2021.

== Kickboxing career ==
=== Early career ===
Bayrak made his professional debut against Geronimo de Groot at RINGS Holland in November 2011. He lost the fight by decision. May 2015, Bayrak participated in the 2015 A1 World Combat Cup Middleweight tournament. He beat Errol Koning and Sahak Parparyan by decision in the quarter and semifinals, before facing Ibrahim El Bouni in the finals. El Bouni won the fight by a first-round knockout.

Following this tournament, Bayrak went on a more successful run, amassing five victories in six fights, before taking part in the 2017 WFL Middleweight tournament. He beat Errol Koning by decision in the semifinals, and Darryl Sichtman by decision in the final bout. After knocking out Aziz El Felak in August 2018, Bayrak entered the 2018 WFL Wildcard Middleweight tournament. He won decisions against Badr Ferdous in the semifinals and Dennis Ipema in the finals to win the tournament. His eight fight winning streak was snapped at Number One Fight Show, when he lost a decision to Maxim Vorovski.

=== GLORY ===
Bayrak made his promotional debut at Glory 62: Rotterdam against Donovan Wisse. He won the fight by split decision. He next faced Jakob Styben at Glory 64: Strasbourg, and once again won a split decision. These two victories earned him the chance to fight Alex Pereira at Glory Collision 2 for the Glory Middleweight title. Pereira won the fight by a first-round knockout.

Bayrak was booked to face the #4 ranked Glory middleweight contender Serkan Ozcaglayan at Glory 80 on March 19, 2022, following a 27-month absence from the sport. He lost the fight by unanimous decision.

Bayrak faced Michael Boapeah at Glory 84 on March 11, 2023. He lost the fight by unanimous decision.

== Titles and accomplishments ==
- A1 World Combat Cup
  - 2015 A1 WCC 86 kg Tournament Runner-up
- World Fighting League
  - 2017 WFL -86 kg Tournament Winner
  - 2018 WFL -86 kg Tournament Winner

== Kickboxing record ==
Kickboxing record
17 Wins (5 (T)KO's), 10 Losses
| Date | Result | Opponent | Event | Location | Method | Round | Time |
| 2023-03-11 | Loss | (Ghana) Michael Boapeah | Glory 84 | Rotterdam, Netherlands | Decision (Unanimous) | 3 | 3:00 |
| 2022-03-19 | Loss | (Turkey) Serkan Ozcaglayan | Glory 80 | Hasselt, Belgium | Decision (Unanimous) | 3 | 3:00 |
| 2019-12-21 | Loss | (Brazil) Alex Pereira | Glory Collision 2 | Arnhem, Netherlands | KO (Left Hook) | 1 | 3:00 |
For the Glory Middleweight Championship
| 2019-03-09 | Win | (Germany) Jakob Styben | Glory 64: Strasbourg | Strasbourg, France | Decision (Split) | 3 | 3:00 |
| 2018-12-08 | Win | (Suriname) Donovan Wisse | Glory 62: Rotterdam | Rotterdam, Netherlands | Decision (Split) | 3 | 3:00 |
| 2018-05-18 | Loss | (Estonia) Maxim Vorovski | Number One Fight Show | Tallinn, Estonia | KO (Right hook) | 3 | 1:30 |
| 2018-03-25 | Win | (Netherlands) Dennis Ipema | World Fighting League: Final 8 Wildcard Tournament, Final | Almere, Netherlands | Decision | 3 | 3:00 |
Wins the WFL -86kg 2018 title.
| 2018-03-25 | Win | (Morocco) Badr Ferdaous | World Fighting League: Final 8 Wildcard Tournament, Semi Final | Almere, Netherlands | Decision | 3 | 3:00 |
| 2017-08-05 | Win | (Morocco) Aziz El Felak | King Mohammed Grand Prix | Tangier, Morocco | TKO (injury) | 1 | 1:39 |
| 2017-04-23 | Win | (Netherlands) Darryl Sichtman | World Fighting League, Final | Almere, Netherlands | Decision | 3 | 3:00 |
Wins the WFL -86kg 2017 title.
| 2017-04-23 | Win | (Netherlands) Errol Koning | World Fighting League, Semi Final | Almere, Netherlands | Decision | 3 | 3:00 |
| 2016-10-15 | Win | (China) Guo Qiang | Rise of Heroes 2 | Zhangshu, China | KO (Right cross) | 1 | |
| 2016-04-03 | Win | (Netherlands) Clyde Brunswijk | World Fighting League | Almere, Netherlands | Decision | 3 | 3:00 |
| 2016-02-27 | Win | (Morocco) Khalid El Bakouri | ENFUSION | Eindhoven, Netherlands | Decision | 3 | 3:00 |
| 2016-01-23 | Loss | (Netherlands) Ibrahim El Boustati | Sportmani Events VIII - The Ultimate Battles | Amsterdam, Netherlands | Decision | 3 | 3:00 |
| 2015-11-28 | Win | (Netherlands) Dennis Koeiman | A1 World Combat Cup | Eindhoven, Netherlands | TKO (lowkicks) | 2 | |
| 2015-10-18 | Win | (Morocco) Reda Zaidi | World Fighting League | Hoofddorp, Netherlands | Decision | 3 | 3:00 |
| 2015-05-16 | Loss | (Morocco) Ibrahim El Bouni | A1 World Combat Cup, Final | Eindhoven, Netherlands | KO | 1 | 3:00 |
For the A1 WCC 86kg Tournament title.
| 2015-05-16 | Win | (Armenia) Sahak Parparyan | A1 World Combat Cup, Semi Finals | Eindhoven, Netherlands | Decision | 3 | 3:00 |
| 2015-05-16 | Win | (Netherlands) Errol Koning | A1 World Combat Cup, Quarter Finals | Eindhoven, Netherlands | Decision | 4 | 3:00 |
| 2015-03-21 | Win | (Germany) Sergej Braun | Night of the Champions 3 | Frankfurt, Germany | Decision | 3 | 3:00 |
| 2014-09-27 | Loss | (Morocco) Boubaker El Bakouri | A1 World Combat Cup | Eindhoven, Netherlands | Decision | 3 | 3:00 |
| 2014-05-17 | Loss | (Netherlands) Hicham El Gaoui | A1 World Combat Cup | Eindhoven, Netherlands | TKO | | |
| 2014-02-15 | Loss | (Germany) Sergej Braun | Phoenix Events | Frankfurt, Germany | Decision | 3 | 3:00 |
| 2013-09-28 | Win | (Netherlands) Martin Reemeijer | A1 World Combat Cup | Eindhoven, Netherlands | TKO | 2 | 3:00 |
| 2013-05-11 | Win | (Netherlands) Rick de Kruijf | Enfusion Fighting Rookies | Eindhoven, Netherlands | TKO | 2 | |
| 2012-11-02 | Loss | (Netherlands) Geronimo de Groot | RINGS Holland | Amersfoort, Netherlands | Decision | 3 | |
Legend: Win Loss Draw/No contest Notes

== See also ==
- List of male kickboxers
