= César Almeida (fighter) =

Brazilian kickboxer

- Born: César Almeida de Oliveira; 28 March 1988 (age 38); São Paulo, Brazil
- Other names: Cesinha
- Height: 6 ft 1 in (185 cm)
- Weight: 185 lb (84 kg; 13 st 3 lb)
- Division: Middleweight
- Style: Kickboxing
- Stance: Orthodox
- Fighting out of: São Paulo, Brazil
- Team: Superfight Team / Rizzo RVT / Corinthians
- Years active: 2009–present

Kickboxing record
- Total: 57
- Wins: 47
- By knockout: 27
- Losses: 8
- Draws: 1
- No contests: 1

Mixed martial arts record
- Total: 11
- Wins: 8
- By knockout: 6
- By decision: 2
- Losses: 3
- By knockout: 1
- By decision: 2

Other information
- Mixed martial arts record from Sherdog

César Almeida de Oliveira (born 28 March 1988) is a Brazilian mixed martial artist and former kickboxer who currently competes in the Middleweight division of the Ultimate Fighting Championship (UFC). In kickboxing he competed in Glory, WGP Kickboxing and Superkombat.

As of January 2023, he was ranked as the second best middleweight kickboxer in the world by Beyond Kickboxing and as the third best middleweight in the world by Combat Press.

== Kickboxing career ==
=== Early career ===
Almeida took part in the 2013 WGP Kickboxing Cruiserweight tournament, held at WGP Kickboxing 17 on 21 December 2013. He was booked to face Cristian Torres in the semifinals of the one-day tournament. Almeida won the fight by a second-round knockout and advanced to the finals, where he faced Alex Pereira. He won the fight by decision.

Almeida fought a trilogy bout with Pereira, with the WGP Kickboxing Cruiserweight championship on the line, at WGP Kickboxing 25 on 25 July 2015. He lost the fight by unanimous decision.

=== Superkombat Light Heavyweight Plus Champion ===
César faced Moises Baute for the SUPERKOMBAT Light Heavyweight Plus championship and the WKN International Kickboxing oriental rules title at SUPERKOMBAT World Grand Prix II 2016 on 7 May 2016. He won the fight by unanimous decision. He extended his win streak to three fights with a second round stoppage of Guilherme Gimenez at WGP Kickboxing 33 on 10 September 2016.

Almeida took part in the WGP Kickboxing Heavyweight (-94.1 kg) tournament, which was held at WGP Kickboxing 34 on 1 November 2016. He was able to overcome Ricardo Soneca in the semifinals of the one-day tournament by a second-round knockout and advanced to the finals, where he suffered a decision loss to Haime Morais.

Almeida faced Marcelo Nuñez at WGP Kickboxing 36 on 7 April 2017. He won the fight by unanimous decision.

Almeida faced Lucas Alsina for the WGP Kickboxing Cruiserweight (85 kg) championship at WGP Kickboxing 50 on 27 October 2018. He beat Alsina by a fourth-round knockout, managing to stop his opponent through repeated low kicks.

After capturing his fourth piece of professional silverware, Alemida would go on to fight in two non-title bouts. Almeida was first booked to face Hao Guanghua at MAS Fight on 10 November 2018. He won the fight by stoppage. Alemida next faced Lucas Dallapico at Premier Fight League on 23 February 2019. He won the fight by a second-round technical knockout.

Almeida made his first WGP Kickboxing Cruiserweight title defense against Ivan Galaz at WGP Kickboxing 54 on 24 May 2019. He retained the title by a decision draw.

Almeida faced Sergey Veselkin in his Fair Fight debut at Fair Fight IX on 8 July 2019. He lost the fight by decision, after an extra fourth round was contested. Almeida faced Igor Bugaenko in his second appearance with the promotion at Fair Fight X on 26 October 2019. He won the fight by an extra round decision.

=== Glory ===
Almeida made his Glory debut against Donovan Wisse at Glory Collision 2 on 21 December 2019. Wisse won the fight by majority decision.

Almeida made his second WGP Kickboxing Cruiserweight title defense against Ivan Galaz at WGP Kickboxing 66 on 3 September 2022, following a three-year break from the sport of kickboxing. He won the fight by a first-round knockout.

Almeida faced the #1 ranked Glory middleweight contender Serkan Ozcaglayan at Glory: Collision 4 on 8 October 2022. He won the fight by a dominant unanimous decision, with all five judges awarding him a 29–26 scorecard.

Almeida was expected to challenge the Glory Middleweight (-85 kg) champion Donovan Wisse at Glory 83 on 11 February 2023. The bout was a rematch of their first meeting, that took place on 21 December 2019, and which Wisse won by majority decision. The fight was downgraded to a three-round non-title bout, however, as Almeida missed weight by one kilogram at the official weigh-ins. Almeida lost the fight by unanimous decision.

== Mixed martial arts career ==
Almeida made his return to mixed martial arts against the LFA Middleweight champion Lucas Fernando on the seventh season of the DWCS on 8 August 2023. He won the fight by unanimous decision and was awarded a contract with the Ultimate Fighting Championship.

=== Ultimate Fighting Championship ===
Almeida was scheduled to face Christian Leroy Duncan on 18 November 2023 at UFC Fight Night 232. However, he was pulled out from the event for medical reasons.

Almeida was scheduled to face Josh Fremd on 6 April 2024, at UFC Fight Night 240. However, Fremd withdrew from the event for unknown reasons and he was replaced by Dylan Budka. Almeida won in his UFC debut via technical knockout in the second round. This fight earned him the Performance of the Night award.

Almeida faced Roman Kopylov on 1 June 2024 at UFC 302. He lost the bout by split decision.

Almeida faced Ihor Potieria on 5 October 2024 at UFC 307. He won the fight by unanimous decision.

Almeida faced Abdul Razak Alhassan on 11 January 2025 at UFC Fight Night 249. He won the fight by a left hook knockout in the first round. This fight earned him another Performance of the Night award.

Almeida faced Cezary Oleksiejczuk on 13 December 2025, at UFC on ESPN 73. He lost the fight via unanimous decision.

Almeida faced Damian Pinas on 11 July 2026 at UFC 329. He lost the fight by knockout at the end of the first round.

Replacing Baisangur Susurkaev, Almeida faced Donte Johnson on 14 November 2026, at UFC 334. On the day of the weigh-ins, it was announced that the bout would be moved to a 190 pound catchweight, with Almeida forfeiting 30 percent of his purse to Johnson. Almeida won the fight by technical knockout in the first round.

== Championships and accomplishments ==
=== Kickboxing ===
- SUPERKOMBAT Fighting Championship
  - 2016 SUPERKOMBAT Light Heavyweight Plus (-86 kg) Championship
- World Kickboxing Network
  - 2016 WKN International Oriental Rules Super Light Heayvweight (-85 kg) Championship
- World Association of Kickboxing Organizations
  - 2014 WAKO Pro Brazilian Light Cruiserweight (-85 kg) K-1 Rules Championship
- WGP Kickboxing
  - 2013 WGP Kickboxing Cruiserweight (-85 kg) Tournament winner
  - 2018 WGP Kickboxing Cruiserweight (-85 kg) Championship
- Brazilian Kickboxing Federation
  - 2013 Brazil National -81 kg Kickboxing Championship

=== Mixed martial arts ===
- Ultimate Fighting Championship
  - Performance of the Night (Two times) vs. Dylan Budka and Abdul Razak Alhassan
  - UFC Honors Awards
    - 2025: Fan's Choice Comeback of the Year Nominee vs. Abdul Razak Alhassan
- Bloody Elbow
  - 2025 #3 Ranked Knockout of the Year vs. Abdul Razak Alhassan

== Mixed martial arts record ==
Professional record breakdown
11 matches	8 wins	3 losses
By knockout	6	1
By decision	2	2

Res.	Record	Opponent	Method	Event	Date	Round	Time	Location	Notes
Win	8–3	Donte Johnson	TKO (punches)	UFC 334	14 November 2026	1	3:20	New York City, New York, United States	Catchweight (190 lb) bout.
Loss	7–3	Damian Pinas	KO (punch)	UFC 329	11 July 2026	1	4:44	Las Vegas, Nevada, United States	
Loss	7–2	Cezary Oleksiejczuk	Decision (unanimous)	UFC on ESPN: Royval vs. Kape	13 December 2025	3	5:00	Las Vegas, Nevada, United States	
Win	7–1	Abdul Razak Alhassan	KO (punch)	UFC Fight Night: Dern vs. Ribas 2	11 January 2025	1	4:16	Las Vegas, Nevada, United States	Performance of the Night.
Win	6–1	Ihor Potieria	Decision (unanimous)	UFC 307	5 October 2024	3	5:00	Salt Lake City, Utah, United States	
Loss	5–1	Roman Kopylov	Decision (split)	UFC 302	1 June 2024	3	5:00	Newark, New Jersey, United States	
Win	5–0	Dylan Budka	TKO (punches)	UFC Fight Night: Allen vs. Curtis 2	6 April 2024	2	2:13	Las Vegas, Nevada, United States	Performance of the Night.
Win	4–0	Lucas Fernando	Decision (unanimous)	Dana White's Contender Series 57	8 August 2023	3	5:00	Las Vegas, Nevada, United States	
Win	3–0	Danilo Souza	KO (punch)	Shooto Brazil 110	18 December 2021	1	0:45	Rio de Janeiro, Brazil	
Win	2–0	Vitor Costa	TKO (punches)	Road to Future 1	27 June 2021	1	4:51	São Paulo, Brazil	
Win	1–0	Thiago Araujo	TKO (punches)	Shooto Brazil 61	13 February 2016	1	1:08	Rio de Janeiro, Brazil	Middleweight debut.

== Kickboxing record ==
Professional kickboxing record
47 wins (27 (T)KOs), 8 losses, 1 draw, 1 no contest
Date	Result	Opponent	Event	Location	Method	Round	Time
2023-02-11	Loss	(Suriname) Donovan Wisse	Glory 83	Essen, Germany	Decision (unanimous)	3	3:00
2022-10-08	Win	(Turkey) Serkan Ozcaglayan	Glory: Collision 4	Arnhem, Netherlands	Decision (unanimous)	3	3:00
2022-09-03	NC	(Chile) Ivan Galaz	WGP Kickboxing 66	São Bernardo do Campo, Brazil	No contest (hit after the bell)	1	3:00
For the WGP Kickboxing -85kg title. Originally a KO win for Almeida overturned to a no contest after review due to the knockout blow landing after the bell.
2019-12-21	Loss	(Suriname) Donovan Wisse	Glory Collision 2	Arnhem, Netherlands	Decision (majority)	3	3:00
2019-10-26	Win	(Belarus) Igor Bugaenko	Fair Fight X	Yekaterinburg, Russia	Ext. R. decision (unanimous)	4	3:00
2019-07-08	Loss	(Russia) Sergey Veselkin	Fair Fight IX	Yekaterinburg, Russia	Ext. R. decision (unanimous)	4	3:00
2019-05-24	Draw	(Chile) Ivan Galaz	WGP Kickboxing 54	Santiago, Chile	Decision	5	3:00
Defends the WGP Kickboxing Cruiserweight (-85kg) title.
2019-02-23	Win	(Brazil) Lucas Dallapico	Premier Fight League	Lauro de Freitas, Brazil	TKO	2	
2018-11-10	Win	(China) Hao Guanghua	MAS Fight	Macau	KO (punches)	1	8:31
2018-10-27	Win	(Argentina) Lucas Alsina	WGP Kickboxing 50	São Paulo, Brazil	KO (low kicks)	4	
Wins the vacant WGP Kickboxing Cruiserweight (-85kg) title.
2018-05-18	Win	(Brazil) Nattan Novak	WGP Kickboxing 46	São Paulo, Brazil	KO (left hook to the body)	2	2:56
2017-04-07	Win	(Paraguay) Marcelo Nuñez	WGP Kickboxing 36	São Paulo, Brazil	Decision (unanimous)	3	3:00
2016-11-01	Loss	(Brazil) Haime Morais	WGP Kickboxing 34, Final	São Paulo, Brazil	Decision	3	3:00
For the vacant WGP Kickboxing Cruiserweight (-94.1kg) title.
2016-11-01	Win	(Brazil) Ricardo Soneca	WGP Kickboxing 34, Semi Final	São Paulo, Brazil	KO (high kick & punches)	2	2:40
2016-09-10	Win	(Brazil) Guilherme Gimenez	WGP Kickboxing 33	São Paulo, Brazil	KO (low kick)	2	0:25
2016-05-07	Win	(Spain) Moises Baute	SUPERKOMBAT World Grand Prix II 2016	Bucharest, Romania	Decision (unanimous)	3	3:00
Wins the inaugural SUPERKOMBAT Light Heavyweight Plus (-85kg) title and the WKN International oriental rules Super Light Heayweight (-85kg) title.
2015-12-19	Win	(Brazil) Rodolfo Cavalo	WGP Kickboxing 28	Brazil	KO (right cross)	1	1:40
2015-07-25	Loss	(Brazil) Alex Pereira	WGP Kickboxing 25	São Paulo, Brazil	Decision (unanimous)	5	3:00
For the vacant WGP Kickboxing Middleweight (-85 kg) title.
2014-11-29	Win	(Russia) Aleksandr Dmitrenko	WGP Kickboxing 23	São Paulo, Brazil	Decision	3	3:00
2014-09-27	Win	(Brazil) Francisco Araujo	WGP Kickboxing 22	São Paulo, Brazil	KO (right low kick)	2	2:50
Wins the WAKO Pro Brazil Light Cruiserweight (-85kg) title.
2013-12-21	Win	(Brazil) Alex Pereira	WGP Kickboxing 17, Final	São Paulo, Brazil	Decision	3	3:00
Wins the WGP Kickboxing Cruiserweight (-85kg) Tournament title.
2013-12-21	Win	(Brazil) Ricardo Soneca	WGP Kickboxing 14	São Paulo, Brazil	Decision (unanimous)	3	3:00
2013-03-23	Loss	(Brazil) Alex Pereira	WGP Kickboxing 12	São Caetano, Brazil	Decision (unanimous)	3	
2013-01-25	Win	(Brazil) Rony Silva	Jungle Fight 48	São Paulo, Brazil	Decision (unanimous)	5	3:00
2012-11-10	Win	(Brazil) Alessandro Benacci	WGP Kickboxing x It's Showtime 60	São Paulo, Brazil	KO (low kick)	3	
2012-08-25	Loss	(Brazil) Fernando Nonato	WGP Kickboxing 6	Brazil	Decision	3	3:00
2012-07-07	Win	(Brazil) Paulo Goes	WGP Kickboxing	São Paulo, Brazil	TKO (doctor stoppage)	1	0:34
2012-04-07	Win	(Brazil) Marcos Caçador	WGP Kickboxing 5	Brazil	Decision	3	3:00
2009-11-21	Win	(Brazil) Marcelo Lisboa	SP1. PRO MAX. 2	Brazil	Decision	3	3:00
Legend: Win Loss Draw/no contest Notes

== See also ==
- List of current UFC fighters
- List of male mixed martial artists
- List of male kickboxers
