= Donovan Wisse =

Surinamese-Dutch kickboxer (born 1997)

- Born: February 21, 1997 (age 29); Paramaribo, Suriname
- Height: 1.88 m (6 ft 2 in)
- Weight: 84 kg (185 lb; 13.2 st)
- Division: Middleweight
- Style: Kickboxing
- Fighting out of: Wassenaar, Netherlands
- Team: Kickboxing Fearless
- Trainer: Jervin Watson & Dave Davis
- Years active: 2016–present

Kickboxing record
- Total: 28
- Wins: 25
- By knockout: 10
- Losses: 3
- By knockout: 0
- Draws: 0

Donovan Wisse (born February 21, 1997) is a Surinamese-Dutch kickboxer currently signed with Glory, where he is the former Glory Middleweight Champion.

He is ranked as the best middleweight in the world by Combat Press as of April 2026, and #2 by Beyond Kickboxing as of June 2026. He is also ranked the #6 pound-for-pound kickboxer in the world by Beyond Kickboxing, and the #10 pound-for-pound kickboxer in the world by Combat Press. He's been ranked in the Combat Press top ten since June 2019.

== Background ==
Wisse was born and raised in Paramaribo, Suriname. He began training in boxing at the age of nine under his father, after which he switched to kickboxing. A year later, he joined the Simson Gym led by Angelo Simson, the cousin of Muay Thai world champion Rayen Simson, where he trained for nine years. He then founded his own team, Team Wisse, and trains with coach Jervin Watson. He also occasionally trains in Wassenaar, the Netherlands at the gym Kickboxing Fearless owned by Dave Davis.

== Kickboxing career ==
=== Early career ===
Wisse faced Jay Overmeer at World Fighting League 5 : Champions vs. Champions on April 23, 2017. He won the fight by unanimous decision. Wisse next faced Adem Bozkurt at Akin Dovus Arenasi on May 13, 2017. He won the fight by decision. Wisse faced Erwin van de Beld at Enfusion Talents on June 3, 2017. He won the fight by a first-round technical knockout. Wisse fought the future Enfusion Middleweight champion Mohammad Ghaedibardeh on November 11, 2017. He won the fight by a second-round technical knockout.

Wisse fought Rodrigo da Paixao at the Gala Fearless. Donovan won the fight by a first-round KO. Wisse returned to Enfusion for his next fight, which was against Muhammed Balli at Enfusion The Hague on May 12, 2018. He knocked Balli out in the first round.

=== Glory ===
==== Early promotional career ====
Wisse made his Glory debut at Glory 59: Amsterdam on September 29, 2018, against Kevin Van Heeckeren. Wisse won the fight by unanimous decision.

Wisse suffered the first professional loss of his career in his second Glory appearance, losing a split decision to Ertugrul Bayrak at Glory 62: Rotterdam on December 8, 2018.

Wisse's third fight with Glory came against Matěj Peňáz at Glory 64: Strasbourg on March 9, 2019. He stepped in as a short-notice replacement for Yassine Ahaggan, who was forced to withdraw due to undisclosed reasons. Wisse beat Peňáz by knockout in the second round.

Wisse next faced Yousri Belgaroui at Glory 65: Utrecht on May 17, 2019. Wisse won the fight by a unanimous decision.

Wisse was booked to fight Jason Wilnis at Glory 70: Lyon on October 26, 2019. He won the fight by unanimous decision.

Wisse was scheduled to fight César Almeida at Glory Collision 2 on December 21, 2019. He won the fight by a majority decision.

==== Glory Middleweight champion ====
Wisse was booked to fight Yousri Belgaroui at Glory 78: Rotterdam for the vacant Glory Middleweight Championship. He won the fight by a third-round technical knockout. A knee strike landed by Wisse opened a cut on Belgaroui's forehead, which forced the ringside doctor to stop the fight.

Wisse made his first Glory Middleweight title defense against the promotional newcomer Juri De Sousa at Glory 81: Ben Saddik vs. Adegbuy 2 on August 20, 2022. He retained the title by a dominant unanimous decision, with all five judges awarding him every round of the bout.

Wisse was expected to make his second Glory title defense against the top ranked Glory middleweight contender César Almeida at Glory 83 on February 11, 2023. The fight was downgraded to a three-round non-title bout however, as Almeida missed weight by one kilogram at the official weigh-ins. Wisse won the fight by unanimous decision.

Wisse made his second title defense against Serkan Ozcaglayan at Glory: Collision 5 on June 17, 2023. He retained the title by unanimous decision.

Wisse was expected to make his third title defense against Michael Boapeah at Glory 89 on October 7, 2023. Wisse withdrew from the bout on August 31, due to illness. The championship bout was rescheduled to take place at Glory: Collision 6 on November 4, 2023. Wisse retained the title by unanimous decision.

Wisse made his fourth Glory Middleweight Championship defense against Ulric Bokeme at Glory 92 on May 18, 2024. He won the fight by split decision.

Wisse made his fifth Glory Middleweight Championship defense against Sergej Braun at Glory 96 on October 12, 2024. He won the fight by unanimous decision.

Wisse made his sixth Glory Middleweight Championship defense against Michael Boapeah at Glory 100 on June 14, 2025. He won the fight by split decision.

Wisse was scheduled to face Bahram Rajabzadeh for the vacant Glory Light Heavyweight Championship at Glory 107 on April 25, 2026. The bout would be cancelled after Rajabzadeh had to withdraw due to an injury. Wisse would instead defend his Middleweight title against the reigning Glory Welterweight Champion, Chico Kwasi. He lost the bout via split decision, in what was hailed as one of the best fights of the year.

Wisse made his Light Heavyweight debut at Glory Collision 9, on June 13, 2026, entering the Light Heavyweight Grand Prix for the still vacant Glory Light Heavyweight Championship. He faced Luis Tavares in the Quarterfinals, winning a unanimous decision, the faced two-time Middleweight title challenger Michael Boapeah for a third time, winning another unanimous decision. He would then face Mohamed Touchassie in the Finals, losing a very close split decision.

== Titles and accomplishments ==
- Glory
  - 2021 Glory Middleweight (-85 kg) Championship
    - Six successful title defenses
    - Most consecutive title defenses in Glory Middleweight division history (6)
    - Longest title reign in Glory Middleweight division history (1694 days)
  - 2023 Glory Fighter of the Year

== Kickboxing record ==
Professional Kickboxing record
25 Wins (10 (T)KOs), 3 Losses
Date	Result	Opponent	Event	Location	Method	Round	Time	Record
2026-12-12		(Romania) Ștefan Lătescu	Glory Collision 10	Arnhem, Netherlands				
2026-06-13	Loss	(Morocco) Mohamed Touchassie	Glory Collision 9 - Light Heavyweight Grand Prix, Final	Rotterdam, Netherlands	Decision (Split)	3	3:00	25–3
For the 2026 Glory Light Heavyweight Grand Prix title and the vacant Glory Light Heavyweight Championship.
2026-06-13	Win	(Ghana) Michael Boapeah	Glory Collision 9 - Light Heavyweight Grand Prix, Semifinals	Rotterdam, Netherlands	Decision (Unanimous)	3	3:00	25–2
2026-06-13	Win	(Netherlands) Luis Tavares	Glory Collision 9 - Light Heavyweight Grand Prix, Quarterfinals	Rotterdam, Netherlands	Decision (Unanimous)	3	3:00	24–2
2026-04-25	Loss	(Suriname) Chico Kwasi	Glory 107	Rotterdam, Netherlands	Decision (Split)	5	3:00	23-2
Loses the Glory Middleweight Championship.
2025-06-14	Win	(Ghana) Michael Boapeah	Glory 100	Rotterdam, Netherlands	Decision (Split)	5	3:00	23-1
Defends the Glory Middleweight Championship.
2024-10-12	Win	(Germany) Sergej Braun	Glory 96	Rotterdam, Netherlands	Decision (Unanimous)	5	3:00	22–1
Defends the Glory Middleweight Championship.
2024-05-18	Win	(Switzerland) Ulric Bokeme	Glory 92	Rotterdam, Netherlands	Decision (Split)	5	3:00	21–1
Defends the Glory Middleweight Championship.
2023-11-04	Win	(Ghana) Michael Boapeah	Glory: Collision 6	Arnhem, Netherlands	Decision (Unanimous)	5	3:00	20–1
Defends the Glory Middleweight Championship.
2023-06-17	Win	(Turkey) Serkan Ozcaglayan	Glory: Collision 5	Rotterdam, Netherlands	Decision (Unanimous)	5	3:00	19–1
Defends the Glory Middleweight Championship.
2023-02-11	Win	(Brazil) César Almeida	Glory 83	Essen, Germany	Decision (Unanimous)	3	3:00	18–1
2022-08-20	Win	(Portugal) Juri De Sousa	Glory 81: Ben Saddik vs. Adegbuyi 2	Düsseldorf, Germany	Decision (Unanimous)	5	3:00	17–1
Defends the Glory Middleweight Championship.
2021-09-04	Win	(Tunisia) Yousri Belgaroui	Glory 78: Rotterdam	Rotterdam, Netherlands	TKO (Doctor Stoppage)	3	2:10	16–1
Wins the vacant Glory Middleweight Championship.
2019-12-21	Win	(Brazil) César Almeida	Glory Collision 2	Arnhem, Netherlands	Decision (Majority)	3	3:00	15–1
2019-10-26	Win	(Netherlands) Jason Wilnis	Glory 70: Lyon	Lyon, France	Decision (Unanimous)	3	3:00	14–1
2019-05-17	Win	(Tunisia) Yousri Belgaroui	Glory 65: Utrecht	Utrecht, Netherlands	Decision (Unanimous)	3	3:00	13–1
2019-03-09	Win	(Czech Republic) Matěj Peňáz	Glory 64: Strasbourg	Strasbourg, France	KO (Straight to the body)	2	0:49	12–1
2018-12-08	Loss	(Turkey) Ertugrul Bayrak	Glory 62: Rotterdam	Rotterdam, Netherlands	Decision (Split)	3	3:00	11–1
2018-09-29	Win	(Netherlands) Kevin Van Heeckeren	Glory 59: Amsterdam	Amsterdam, Netherlands	Decision (Unanimous)	3	3:00	11–0
2018-05-12	Win	(Turkey) Muhammed Balli	Enfusion The Hague	The Hague, Netherlands	KO (High Kick)	1	2:00	10–0
2018-01-27	Win	(Brazil) Rodrigo da Paixao	Gala Fearless	Suriname	KO (Left Hook & Knee)	1		9–0
2017-12-22	Win	(France) Remy Vectol	Bloed Zweet en Tranen	Suriname	KO (Head kick)	1		8–0
2017-11-11	Win	(Turkey) Kuzey Aslan	Akin Dövüş Arenasi	Turkey	TKO (Right Cross)	2	1:30	7–0
2017-11-11	Win	(Iran) Mohammad Ghaedibardeh		Istanbul, Turkey	TKO	2		6–0
2017-06-03	Win	(Netherlands) Erwin van de Beld	Enfusion Talents	Groningen, Netherlands	TKO (Punches)	1		5–0
2017-05-13	Win	(Turkey) Adem Bozkurt	Akin Dövüş Arenasi	Turkey	Decision	4	3:00	4–0
2017-04-23	Win	(Netherlands) Jay Overmeer	World Fighting League 5 : Champions vs. Champions	Netherlands	Decision	3	3:00	3–0
2016-12-27	Win	(Suriname) Joshua Karsters	Enfusion Rookies	Paramaribo, Suriname	KO (High Kick)	1	2:20	2–0
2016-11-20	Win	(Spain) Mohammed Rizki	Enfusion Rookies	Groningen, Netherlands	TKO (Retirement)	1	3:00	1–0
Legend: Win Loss Draw/No contest Notes

== See also ==
- List of male kickboxers
