= Yousri Belgaroui =

Tunisian-Dutch kickboxer

- Born: Yousri Belgaroui; June 2, 1992 (age 34); Amsterdam, Netherlands
- Other names: The Boogeyman
- Nationality: Dutch; Tunisian
- Height: 6 ft 5 in (196 cm)
- Weight: 186 lb (84 kg; 13 st 4 lb)
- Division: Middleweight
- Reach: 79 in (201 cm)
- Style: Kickboxing
- Stance: Orthodox
- Fighting out of: Amsterdam, Netherlands
- Team: Mike's Gym (2014–2019); Teixeira MMA & Fitness (2021–present)
- Trainer: Mike Passenier (2014–2019); Glover Teixeira (2021–present)
- Years active: 2014–2021 (kickboxing); 2021–present (MMA)

Kickboxing record
- Total: 34
- Wins: 27
- By knockout: 13
- Losses: 7
- By knockout: 3
- Draws: 0

Mixed martial arts record
- Total: 15
- Wins: 11
- By knockout: 9
- By decision: 2
- Losses: 4
- By decision: 4

Other information
- University: University of Amsterdam
- Boxing record from BoxRec
- Mixed martial arts record from Sherdog
- Last updated on: April 11, 2022

Yousri Belgaroui (born 2 June 1992) is a Tunisian-Dutch kickboxer and mixed martial artist who currently competes in the Middleweight division of the Ultimate Fighting Championship (UFC). In kickboxing, he has competed in Glory, where he is a three-time Glory Middleweight Championship challenger.

He was ranked as a top ten middleweight by Combat Press between November 2021 and March 2022, peaking at No. 2

== Personal life ==
Belgaroui was born in Amsterdam to a Tunisian father and a Dutch mother. He holds a degree in Public Governance and Management from the University of Amsterdam. He works as a commentator for Veronica TV.

== Kickboxing career ==
In 2016 Belgaroui entered the Glory Middleweight Contender's Tournament, held at Glory 34: Denver on October 21, 2016. In the semi-finals, he won a unanimous decision over Ariel Machado, but lost a split decision to Israel Adesanya in the tournament finals.

Yousri entered the 2017 Middleweight Contender Tournament as well, which was held at Glory 40: Copenhagen on April 29, 2017, and was booked to face Agron Preteni in the semifinals. He beat Preteni by a unanimous decision, and faced the future champion Alex Pereira in the tournament finals. Belgaroui won the fight by a unanimous decision.

After his tournament win, Yousri faced Jason Wilnis at Glory 45: Amsterdam on July 30, 2017. He won in the first round due to doctor's stoppage.

Belgaroui challenged Alex Pereira for the Glory Middleweight Championship at Glory 49: Rotterdam on December 9, 2017. Pereira won the fight by a third-round technical knockout.

In his next match, at Glory 53: Lille on May 12, 2018, Belgaroui beat Dawid Kasperski by a second-round technical knockout. This earned him the chance to once again fight for the Glory Middleweight Championship, as he was scheduled to face Pereira at Glory 55: New York on July 20, 2018. Pereira won the fight by a first-round knockout.

Belgaroui bounced back with a first-round knockout of Yassine Ahaggan at Glory 60: Lyon on October 20, 2018, but would lose a unanimous decision to Donovan Wisse at Glory 65: Utrecht on May 17, 2019, in his very next fight. Yousri won his next fights against Ulric Bokeme at Glory 69: Düsseldorf by unanimous decision, and against Jakob Styben at Glory 75: Utrecht by a second-round technical knockout.

Belgaroui was scheduled to fight Donovan Wisse at Glory 78: Rotterdam on September 4, 2021, for the vacant Glory Middleweight Championship. He lost the fight by a third-round technical knockout.

== Mixed martial arts career ==
Belgaroui made his MMA debut at UAE Warriors, being scheduled to fight Badreddine Diani. He won the fight by a unanimous decision. He was next scheduled to fight Sallah-Eddine Dekhissi at UAE Warriors 17, three months after his professional debut. He won the fight by knockout in the first round.

Belgaroui was expected to face Mohamad Osseili at UAE Warriors 23: Arabia 5 on August 28, 2021. The fight was later cancelled for undisclosed reasons. Belgaroui was booked to face Ahmed Sami at UAE Warriors 25: Africa on February 25, 2022. He lost the fight by split decision.

Belgaroui was booked to face Samir Zaidi at UAE Warriors 27 on March 25, 2022. He won the bout via TKO stoppage in the first round. Belgaroui faced Mohamad Osseili at UAE Warriors 31 on July 3, 2022, in his second fight of the year. He lost the bout via unanimous decision.

Belgaroui faced Bogdan Kotlovyanov at Levels Fight League 7 on February 5, 2023. He won the fight by a first-round knockout.

Less than a month later, Belgaroui faced Stefan Pretorius on February 24, 2023, at UAE Warriors 35, winning the bout via TKO stoppage in the second round.

Belgaroui faced Marco Tulio on August 29, 2023, at Dana White's Contender Series 60. He lost the fight via unanimous decision.

Belgaroui was scheduled to face Nathias Frederick in a light heavyweight bout at LFL 10 on October 29, 2023. However, Frederick withdrew from the bout and was replaced by Giorgi Kvelidze. Belgaroui won the fight via TKO in round one.

=== Dana White's Contender Series ===
Belgaroui, replacing Val Woodburn, faced Marco Tulio on August 29, 2023, at Dana White's Contender Series season 7. He lost the fight via unanimous decision

Belgaroui faced Taiga Iwasaki on Dana White's Contender Series 71 on September 10, 2024. After being deducted one point in round two for multiple eye pokes, he was able to win the fight via technical knockout in round three. Despite this, he was not given a contract.

=== Ultimate Fighting Championship ===
Replacing Torrez Finney who withdrew for unknown reasons, Belgaroui was scheduled to make his UFC debut against former LFA Middleweight Champion Azamat Bekoev on August 2, 2025, at UFC on ESPN 71. In turn, as a result of Belgaroui not being able to get a visa in time, the bout was postponed to UFC Fight Night 262 which took place on October 18, 2025. Belgaroui won the fight by technical knockout in the third round.

Belgaroui faced undefeated prospect Mansur Abdul-Malik on March 28, 2026, at UFC Fight Night 271. He won the fight via technical knockout in the third round.

Belgaroui was scheduled to face Kelvin Gastelum on September 12, 2026, at UFC Fight Night 288. However, Gastelum pulled out on August 13 and was replaced by Djorden Santos. Belgaroui won the fight by technical knockout in the first round.

Belgaroui faced Caio Borralho on November 14, 2026, at UFC 334. He lost the fight by unanimous decision.

== Championships and awards ==
=== Mixed martial arts ===
- Levels Fight League
  - LFL Light Heavyweight Championship (one time, current)

=== Kickboxing ===
- Glory
  - 2017 Glory Middleweight (-85 kg/187.4 lb) Contender Tournament winner
- International Ringsports Organisation
  - IRO European Middleweight (-86 kg) Championship

== Mixed martial arts record ==
Professional record breakdown
15 matches	11 wins	4 losses
By knockout	9	0
By decision	2	4

Res.	Record	Opponent	Method	Event	Date	Round	Time	Location	Notes
Loss	11–4	Caio Borralho	Decision (unanimous)	UFC 334	November 14, 2026	3	5:00	New York City, New York, United States	
Win	11–3	Djorden Santos	TKO (punches)	UFC Fight Night: Silva vs. Delgado	September 12, 2026	1	4:25	Glendale, Arizona, United States	
Win	10–3	Mansur Abdul-Malik	TKO (knee)	UFC Fight Night: Adesanya vs. Pyfer	March 28, 2026	3	3:39	Seattle, Washington, United States	
Win	9–3	Azamat Bekoev	TKO (punches)	UFC Fight Night: de Ridder vs. Allen	October 18, 2025	3	0:55	Vancouver, British Columbia, Canada	
Win	8–3	Taiga Iwasaki	TKO (punches)	Dana White's Contender Series 71	September 10, 2024	3	2:34	Las Vegas, Nevada, United States	Return to Middleweight. Belgaroui was deducted one point in round 2 due to multiple eye pokes.
Win	7–3	Ahmed Sami	Decision (unanimous)	Levels Fight League 11	February 18, 2024	5	5:00	Amsterdam, Netherlands	Won the LFL Light Heavyweight Championship.
Win	6–3	Giorgi Kvelidze	TKO (knee and punches)	Levels Fight League 10	October 29, 2023	1	4:59	Amsterdam, Netherlands	Catchweight (190 lb) bout.
Loss	5–3	Marco Tulio	Decision (unanimous)	Dana White's Contender Series 60	August 29, 2023	3	5:00	Las Vegas, Nevada, United States	Middleweight bout.
Win	5–2	Stefan Pretorius	TKO (knee and punches)	UAE Warriors 35	February 24, 2023	2	0:43	Abu Dhabi, United Arab Emirates	
Win	4–2	Bogdan Kotlovyanov	KO (punch to the body)	Levels Fight League 7	February 5, 2023	1	1:15	Amsterdam, Netherlands	Light Heavyweight debut.
Loss	3–2	Mohamad Osseili	Decision (unanimous)	UAE Warriors 31	July 3, 2022	3	5:00	Abu Dhabi, United Arab Emirates	
Win	3–1	Samir Zaidi	TKO (punches)	UAE Warriors 27	March 25, 2022	1	4:32	Abu Dhabi, United Arab Emirates	Catchweight (194 lb) bout.
Loss	2–1	Ahmed Sami	Decision (split)	UAE Warriors 25	February 25, 2022	3	5:00	Abu Dhabi, United Arab Emirates	Catchweight (194 lb) bout.
Win	2–0	Sallah-Eddine Dekhissi	TKO (head kick and punches)	UAE Warriors 17	March 19, 2021	1	2:44	Abu Dhabi, United Arab Emirates	
Win	1–0	Badreddine Diani	Decision (unanimous)	UAE Warriors 16	January 22, 2021	3	5:00	Abu Dhabi, United Arab Emirates	Middleweight debut.

== Kickboxing record ==
Kickboxing record
27 wins (13 KOs), 7 losses, 0 draws
Date	Result	Opponent	Event	Location	Method	Round	Time
2021-09-04	Loss	(Suriname) Donovan Wisse	Glory 78: Rotterdam	Rotterdam, Netherlands	TKO (doctor stoppage)	3	2:10
For the vacant Glory Middleweight Championship.
2020-02-29	Win	(Germany) Jakob Styben	Glory 75: Utrecht	Utrecht, Netherlands	TKO (doctor stoppage)	2	1:02
2019-10-12	Win	(Democratic Republic of the Congo) Ulric Bokeme	Glory 69: Düsseldorf	Germany	Decision (unanimous)	3	3:00
2019-05-17	Loss	(Suriname) Donovan Wisse	Glory 65: Utrecht	Netherlands	Decision (unanimous)	3	3:00
2018-10-20	Win	(France) Yassine Ahaggan	Glory 60: Lyon	Lyon, France	KO (knee to the body)	1	1:22
2018-07-20	Loss	(Brazil) Alex Pereira	Glory 55: New York	New York City	KO (right hook)	1	2:16
For The Glory Middleweight Championship.
2018-05-12	Win	(Poland) Dawid Kasperski	Glory 53: Lille	Lille, France	TKO (3 knockdowns rule)	2	1:16
2017-12-09	Loss	(Brazil) Alex Pereira	Glory 49: Rotterdam	Rotterdam, Netherlands	TKO (cut)	3	1:52
For The Glory Middleweight Championship.
2017-07-30	Win	(Netherlands) Jason Wilnis	Glory 45: Amsterdam	Amsterdam, Netherlands	TKO (cut)	1	2:47
2017-04-29	Win	(Brazil) Alex Pereira	Glory 40: Copenhagen - Middleweight Contender Tournament, Final	Copenhagen, Denmark	Decision (unanimous)	3	3:00
Wins the Glory 40: Copenhagen - Middleweight Contender Tournament Championship.
2017-04-29	Win	(Croatia) Agron Preteni	Glory 40: Copenhagen - Middleweight Contender Tournament, Semi-finals	Copenhagen, Denmark	Decision (unanimous)	3	3:00
2016-10-21	Loss	(Nigeria) Israel Adesanya	Glory 34: Denver - Middleweight Contender Tournament, Final	Broomfield, Colorado, USA	Decision (split)	3	3:00
For the Glory 34: Denver - Middleweight Contender Tournament Championship.
2016-10-21	Win	(Brazil) Ariel Machado	Glory 34: Denver - Middleweight Contender Tournament, Semi-finals	Broomfield, Colorado, USA	Decision (unanimous)	3	3:00
2016-08-23	Loss	(Belarus) Dzianis Hancharonak	Akhmat Fight Show	Grozny, Russia	Decision (unanimous)	3	3:00
2016-08-06	Loss	(Nigeria) Israel Adesanya	Glory of Heroes 4	Changzhi, China	Decision (unanimous)	3	3:00
2016-07-02	Win	(Romania) Sebastian Ciobanu	Respect World Series 2	London, England	KO (high knee)	1	1:02
2016-05-25	Win	(Indonesia) Sergio Eckhart	Enfusion Live Presents Push It To The Limit	Amsterdam, Netherlands	KO (punches)	2	0:56
2016-03-05	Win	(Armenia) Hovik Tikrajan	Fight League, The Battle	Hoofddorp, Netherlands	KO (knee)	1	1:12
2016-02-07	Win	(Netherlands) Henry Akdeniz	Back To The Oldschool	Amsterdam, Netherlands	KO (punches)	3	1:15
2015-11-28	Win	(Netherlands) Jeffrey Ijdo	Enfusion Live Presents Fightsense	The Hague, Netherlands	KO (body knee)	1	2:03
2015-10-24	Win	(Belgium) Zakaria Khelil	IRO European Championship	Drachten, Netherlands	KO (body knee)	1	0:31
Wins IRO European Championship belt -86 kg.
2015-10-02	Win	(Romania) Dumitru Țopai	SUPERKOMBAT World Grand Prix 2015 Final Elimination	Milan, Italy	Decision (unanimous)	3	3:00
2015-09-26	Win	(Netherlands) Tom De Smet	Back To The Oldschool	Amsterdam, Netherlands	Decision	3	3:00
2015-05-24	Win	(Morocco) Youssef Elyaacoubi	Kickboxing Talents 10	Amsterdam, Netherlands	Decision	3	3:00
2015-04-18	Win	(Spain) Alcorac Caballero Lopez	Enfusion Live #27	Tenerife, Spain	Decision (unanimous)	3	3:00
2015-04-04	Win	(Russia) Tagir Bokov	Enfusion Talents #8	The Hague, Netherlands	TKO (doctor stoppage)	1	
2015-03-07	Win	(Netherlands) Redouan Talbi		Groningen, Netherlands	Decision	3	3:000
2014-11-29	Win	(Netherlands) Younes Brahimi	FIGHTSENSE VI	The Hague, Netherlands	Decision	3	3:00
2014-09-13	Win	(Netherlands) Michel Adelina		The Hague, Netherlands	Decision	3	3:00
2014-05-28	Win	(Morocco) Mo Bouzakri	Push It To The Limit	Netherlands	Decision	3	3:00
Legend: Win Loss Draw/no contest Notes

== See also ==
- List of current UFC fighters
- List of male mixed martial artists
- List of male kickboxers
