= Ibrahim El Bouni =

Dutch-Moroccan kickboxer

- Born: Ibrahim El Bouni; December 9, 1992 (age 33); Amsterdam, Netherlands
- Other names: Mr. Cool
- Height: 1.94 m (6 ft 4 1/2 in)
- Weight: 95 kg (209 lb; 15.0 st)
- Division: Heavyweight; Cruiserweight
- Style: Kickboxing
- Fighting out of: Haarlem, Netherlands
- Team: Gym Haarlem
- Trainer: Ridouan El Assrouti
- Years active: 2010 - present

Kickboxing record
- Total: 59
- Wins: 44
- By knockout: 22
- Losses: 14
- By knockout: 5
- Draws: 1

Other information
- Website: https://www.ibrahimelbouni.com/
- Boxing record from BoxRec

Ibrahim El Bouni (born 9 December 1992) is a Dutch-Moroccan kickboxer who currently fights for Glory. El Bouni has formerly competed for ONE Championship, SUPERKOMBAT and K-1.

As of August 21, 2024, he is #5 in the GLORY light-heavyweight rankings.

== Kickboxing career ==
=== Early career ===
He fought Denis Marjanović during FFC 13. El Bouni won the fight by a unanimous decision.

=== SUPERKOMBAT ===
Ibrahim fought in the SUPERKOMBAT World Grand Prix, facing Dawid Kasperski in the quarter-final. He lost a majority decision.

In November 2014, he scored a KO victory over Henry Brinkman.

El Bouni fought in the 2015 WFL 84 kg tournament. Despite defeating Clyde Brunswijk by decision in the semi-final, he in turn lost a decision to Hicham El Gaoui in the final.

He also took part in the A1 World Combat Cup 86 kg tournament. He won decision against Xheyal Ehmedov in the quarter-final, Boubaker El Bakouri in the semi-final, and knocked Ertugrul Bayrak out in the first round to win the tournament.

El Bouni fought Bogdan Stoica for the first time in 2015. He won the fight by a technical knockout, as Stoica suffered a leg injury in the first round, later deemed to be a knee ligament injury.

El Bouni fought for the Real Fighter World Heavyweight Championship against Redouan Cairo, but lost the fight by a late fifth-round knockout.

He fought the former WAKO World champion Dževad Poturak during W5 Grand Prix "Legends in Prague". Ibrahim won the fight by TKO.

=== K-1 ===
El Bouni had his first fight at heavyweight against Makoto Uehara. He won the fight in the second round, with a left hook KO.

Ibrahim fought during the WFL Almere event, winning the fight in the third round by knockout.

El Bouni participated in the 2017 K-1 Heavyweight Grand Prix. After winning the first two bouts against Koichi and Roel Mannaart by first-round knockout, he faced Antonio Plazibat in the tournament finals. Plazibat won the fight by a unanimous decision.

After his loss to Plazibat, he took part in the WFL Reserve Tournament. In the semi-finals he beat Bogdan Stoica by decision, and won a unanimous decision against Fred Sikking in the finals.

=== ONE Championship ===
El Bouni signed for ONE Championship in June 2018, and fought Andre Meunir in his organizational debut. El Bouni won the fight by a first-round KO.

In his second fight with the organization, El Bouni fought Tarik Khbabez. Khabez won the fight in the third round, by a TKO.

El Bouni fought Andrei Stoica during ONE Championship: Roots of Honor. Stoica won the fight by a unanimous decision, although El Bouni complained of repeated fouls after the fight, as Stoica landed an inadvertent groin shot and eye poke during the bout.

=== Glory ===
In early 2021, El Bouni signed with Glory. He notched two unanimous decision victories, against Clyde Brunswijk at Glory Rivals 1 and Badr Ferdaous at Glory Rivals 2, before being booked to face Muhammed Balli in the main event of Glory Rivals 3 on November 5, 2022. He stopped Balli with a left hook at the 2:14 minute mark of the opening round.

El Bouni faced Ștefan Lătescu at Glory: Collision 6 on November 4, 2023. He lost the fight by a second-round technical knockout.

El Bouni faced Bogdan Stoica at Glory 96 on October 12, 2024. He won the fight by unanimous decision, after an extra fourth round was contested.

El Bouni faced Michael Boapeah at Glory 98 on February 22, 2025. He lost the fight via TKO in the third round, being knocked down 4 times, twice in round 2, and twice in round 3.

=== K-1 ===
El Bouni faced Marco Black Diamond in the quarterfinals of the 2026 K-1 World Cruiserweight Grand Prix at K-1 World GP 2026 - 90kg World Championship Tournament on February 8, 2026. He won the fight by unanimous decision, with three scorecards of 29–25 in his favor. El Bouni was eliminated in the tournament semifinals however, as he suffered a unanimous decision loss at the hands of Nikita Kozlov, with scores of 30–26, 30—26 and 30–27.

== Championships and accomplishments ==
- World Fighting League
  - 2015 World Fighting League -84 kg Tournament runner-up
  - 2015 World Fighting League -86 kg Tournament winner
- A1 WCC
  - 2015 A1 World Combat Cup -86 kg Tournament winner
- K-1
  - K-1 World GP 2017 inaugural Heavyweight Championship Tournament runner-up
  - K-1 WORLD GP 2026 -90kg World Championship Tournament 3rd place

== Kickboxing record ==
Kickboxing record
44 wins (22 (T)KOs), 14 losses, 1 draw
Date	Result	Opponent	Event	Location	Method	Round	Time
2026-11-01	Loss	(Turkey) Yasin Güren	World Fighting League	Antwerp, Belgium	Decision (unanimous)	5	3:00
For the vacant WFL Light Heavyweight and ISKA K-1 World Super-cruiserweight (-95 kg) titles.
2026-06-27	Win	(Italy) Samuele Pugliese	World Fighting League	Utrecht, Netherlands	Decision (unanimous)	3	3:00
2026-02-08	Loss	(Russia) Nikita Kozlov	K-1 World GP 2026 - 90kg World Championship Tournament, Semifinals	Tokyo, Japan	Decision (unanimous)	3	3:00
2026-02-08	Win	(Brazil) Marco Antonio	K-1 World GP 2026 - 90kg World Championship Tournament, Quarterfinals	Tokyo, Japan	Decision (unanimous)	3	3:00
2025-02-22	Loss	(Ghana) Michael Boapeah	Glory 98	Rotterdam, Netherlands	TKO (4 knockdowns)	3	2:04
2024-10-12	Win	(Romania) Bogdan Stoica	Glory 96	Rotterdam, Netherlands	Ext.R decision (unanimous)	4	3:00
2024-06-08	Loss	(Azerbaijan) Bahram Rajabzadeh	Glory Light Heavyweight Grand Prix, Quarterfinals	Rotterdam, Netherlands	TKO (flying knee)	1	2:02
2023-11-04	Loss	(Romania) Ștefan Lătescu	Glory: Collision 6	Arnhem, Netherlands	TKO (three knockdowns)	2	1:00
Glory Light Heavyweight Title Eliminator
2023-06-17	Win	(Brazil) Felipe Micheletti	Glory: Collision 5	Rotterdam, Netherlands	Decision (unanimous)	3	3:00
2022-11-05	Win	(Turkey) Muhammed Balli	Glory Rivals 3	Amsterdam, Netherlands	KO (left hook)	1	2:12
2022-09-17	Win	(Morocco) Badr Ferdaous	Glory Rivals 2	Alkmaar, Netherlands	Decision (unanimous)	3	3:00
2022-06-11	Win	(Suriname) Clyde Brunswijk	Glory Rivals 1	Alkmaar, Netherlands	Decision (unanimous)	3	3:00
2021-05-28	Win	(Suriname) Marciano Bhugwandass	World Fighting League	Netherlands	Disqualification	2	
2019-04-12	Loss	(Romania) Andrei Stoica	ONE Championship: Roots of Honor	Manila, Philippines	Decision (unanimous)	3	3:00
2018-10-26	Loss	(Morocco) Tarik Khbabez	ONE Championship: Pursuit of Greatness	Myanmar	TKO (referee stoppage)	3	
2018-07-07	Win	(Australia) Andre Meunier	ONE Championship: Battle for the Heavens	Guangzhou, China	KO	1	
2018-03-25	Win	(Netherlands) Fred Sikking	WFL: Final 16	Almere, Netherlands	Decision (unanimous)	3	3:00
2018-03-25	Win	(Romania) Bogdan Stoica	WFL: El Bouni vs. Stoica, Final 16	Almere, Netherlands	Decision (unanimous)	3	3:00
2017-11-23	Loss	(Croatia) Antonio Plazibat	K-1 World GP 2017 Heavyweight Championship Tournament, Final	Saitama, Japan	Decision (unanimous)	3	3:00
For The K-1 World GP 2017 Heavyweight Championship Tournament
2017-11-23	Win	(Netherlands) Roel Mannaart	K-1 World GP 2017 Heavyweight Championship Tournament, Semi-finals	Saitama, Japan	KO	1	
2017-11-23	Win	(Japan) Koichi	K-1 World GP 2017 Heavyweight Championship Tournament, Quarter-finals	Saitama, Japan	KO (left hook)	1	
2017-04-23	Win	(Suriname) Fabio Kwasi	WFL - Champion vs. Champion, Semi-finals	Almere, Netherlands	KO	3	
2017-03-19	Win	(Netherlands) Tomoslav Malencia	Fight Time Haarlem	Haarlem, Netherlands	KO	3	
2017-02-26	Win	(Japan) Makoto Uehara	K-1 World GP 2017 Lightweight Championship Tournament	Tokyo, Japan	KO (left hook)	2	
2016-12-23	Win	(New Zealand) Davor Matarugic	EM Legend End of Year	Emei, China	KO		
2016-11-19	Win	(China) Xing Wenxiu	EM Legend 14	Emei, China	KO (left hook to the body)	1	1:09
2016-10-08	Win	(Bosnia and Herzegovina) Dževad Poturak	W5 Grand Prix "Legends in Prague"	Prague, The Czech Republic	TKO (strikes)	1	
2016-03-04	Win	(Netherlands) Fred Sikking	WFL - Where Heroes Meet Legends	Hoofddorp, Netherlands	Decision	3	3:00
2015-12-06	Loss	(Suriname) Redouan Cairo	Real Fighters: A Night 2 Remember	Hilversum, Netherlands	KO	5	
For The Real Fighter World Championship -95 kg.
2015-10-18	Win	(Romania) Bogdan Stoica	WFL "Unfinished Business"	Hoofddorp, Netherlands	TKO (knee ligament injury)	1	
2015-05-16	Win	(Turkey) Ertugrul Bayrak	A1WCC -86 kg 8 Men Tournament Final	Eindhoven, Netherlands	KO	1	
Wins the A1 WCC 86 kg Tournament.
2015-05-16	Win	(Morocco) Boubaker El Bakouri	A1WCC -86 kg 8 Men Tournament Semi-final	Eindhoven, Netherlands	Decision	3	3:00
2015-05-16	Win	(Azerbaijan) Xheyal Ehmedov	A1WCC -86 kg 8 Men Tournament Quarter-final	Eindhoven, Netherlands	Decision	3	3:00
2015-04-19	Loss	(Morocco) Khalid El Bakouri	The Best of all Elements	Almere, Netherlands	Decision	3	3:00
2015-04-12	Loss	(Morocco) Hicham El Gaoui	World Fighting League, Final	Hoofddorp	Decision	3	3:00
For The World Fighting League -84 kg Tournament Title.
2015-04-12	Win	(Suriname) Clyde Brunswijk	World Fighting League, Semi-finals	Hoofddorp	Decision	3	3:00
2014-11-25	Win	(Netherlands) Henry Brinkman	Fight Night IJmuiden	IJmuiden	KO		
2014-10-25	Loss	(Poland) Dawid Kasperski	SUPERKOMBAT World Grand Prix 2014 Final Elimination, Quarter-finals	Geneva, Switzerland	Decision (majority)	3	3:00
2014-06-08	Win	(Morocco) Samir Boukhidous	Fight Fans 10	Amsterdam	Decision (unanimous)	3	3:00
2014-06-06	Win	(Bosnia and Herzegovina) Denis Marjanović	FFC13: Jurković vs. Tavares	Zadar, Croatia	Decision (unanimous)	3	3:00
2014-04-12	Win	(Serbia) Uroš Bogojević	SUPERKOMBAT World Grand Prix I 2014, Reserve Fight	Reșița, Romania	Decision (unanimous)	3	3:00
2014-03-22	Loss	(Ukraine) Igor Lyapin	KOK World GP 2014, Quarter-finals	Chișinău, Moldova	Decision (split)	3	3:00
2014-02-23	Win	(Netherlands) Iwan Pang	Haarlem Fight Night V	Haarlem	TKO	3	
2013-12-14	Win	(Moldova) Constantin Țuțu	KOK World Series - Eagles 12	Chișinău, Moldova	KO (punches)	1	
2013-12-01	Win	(Netherlands) Sem Braan	Fight Fans 7	Amsterdam	Decision	3	3:00
2013-11-15	Win	(Slovenia) Miran Fabjan	FFC09: McSweeney vs. Traunmuller	Ljubljana, Slovenia	KO (left hook)	2	
2013-08-30	Win	(Romania) Ciprian Șchiopu	SUPERKOMBAT New Heroes 5	Târgoviște, Romania	Decision (unanimous)	3	3:00
2013-06-14	Win	(Bosnia and Herzegovina) Igor Emkić	FFC06: Jurković vs. Poturak	Poreč, Croatia	KO (right cross)	1	
2013-05-11	Win	(Netherlands) Martin Reemeijer	Mejiro Gym Gala	Zaandam, Netherlands	Decision (unanimous)	3	3:00
2013-04-14	Loss	(Croatia) Toni Milanović	FFC03: Jurković vs. Cătinaș	Split, Croatia	Decision (unanimous)	3	3:00
2013-03-24	Win	(Netherlands) Ronnie Roomeijer	Haarlem Fight Night IV	Haarlem	Decision	3	3:00
Makes His A-class debut.
2012-09-01	Win	(Netherlands) Geronimo de Groot	Fight For Victory	Egmond aan Zee, Netherlands	KO		
2011-10-16	Draw	(Netherlands) Tom Van Duivenvoorde	Top Team Gala	Beverwijk, Netherlands	Decision (draw)	3	3:00
Legend: Win Loss Draw/no contest Notes

== See also ==
- List of male kickboxers
