= Caio Borralho =

Brazilian mixed martial artist (born 1993)

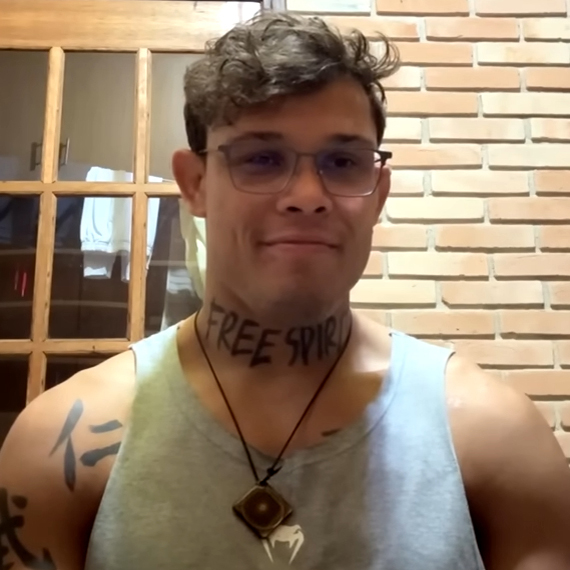
- Borralho in 2025
- Born: Caio Vinícius Silva Borralho; January 16, 1993 (age 33); São Luís, Maranhão, Brazil
- Other names: The Natural
- Height: 6 ft 2 in (1.88 m)
- Weight: 185 lb (84 kg; 13 st 3 lb)
- Division: Light Heavyweight; Middleweight; Welterweight
- Reach: 75 in (191 cm)
- Fighting out of: São Luís, Brazil
- Team: Fighting Nerds
- Rank: Black belt in Brazilian Jiu-Jitsu; Black belt in Muay Thai; Brown belt in Judo
- Years active: 2014–present

Mixed martial arts record
- Total: 22
- Wins: 19
- By knockout: 5
- By submission: 4
- By decision: 10
- Losses: 2
- By decision: 2
- No contests: 1

Other information
- Mixed martial arts record from Sherdog

Caio Vinícius Silva Borralho (born January 16, 1993) is a Brazilian professional mixed martial artist who currently competes in the Middleweight division of the Ultimate Fighting Championship (UFC). As of November 14, 2026, he is #5 in the Meta UFC middleweight rankings.

== Background ==
Caio Borralho was born January 16, 1993 in São Luís, Maranhão. His grandfather was a math teacher and, inspired by him, Borralho started tutoring at 15 years old in math and chemistry.

After graduation, Borralho went to the Universidade Federal do Maranhão (UFMA) to study industrial chemistry. During his university years, he was offered an internship opportunity at Brazilian brewery giant Ambev; he would reject this offer, and would ultimately drop out from university as he became passionate about pursuing a career in MMA sometime in 2014.

Borralho first started training mixed martial arts around the age of eighteen years old, but his very first MMA fight occurred in 2014, when he was around twenty-one years old as an amateur, at Dojô James Adler, located in the metropolitan city of São Luís, Maranhão.

Before MMA, Borralho dabbled in other types of martial arts. His very first journey into the world of martial arts came when he was six years old with grappling arts like judo, with Sensei Emílio Moreira serving as his very first mentor. In judo he has won multiple championships at state (Maranhão) and national levels.

After losing to an opponent in a Judo tournament via armlock, Borralho's Sensei Emílio Moreira directed him to train in jiu-jitsu in order to enrich his judo skills. Not long after Borralho also began training in Muay Thai, but he opted out of these martial arts (judo and Muay Thai) in 2014 to pursue a pro career in MMA, as he moved out from his native town of São Luís to the city of São Paulo. Eventually, he started his own MMA team Fighting Nerds with his coach Pablo Sucupira.

== Mixed martial arts career ==
Borralho had an amateur win in 2014 before turning professional later that year. After compiling a record of 8–1–1, he was invited to compete on Dana White's Contender Series.

=== Dana White’s Contender Series ===
Borralho made his Contender Series debut against Aaron Jeffery on September 28, 2021. He won via unanimous decision, but did not get a contract with the UFC.

He returned a month later, a significant favorite against 8–3 Jesse Murray. The fight was at Light Heavyweight, and Borralho won via first-round TKO, earning a contract with the UFC.

=== Ultimate Fighting Championship ===
Borralho was signed by the UFC and made his promotional debut against Gadzhi Omargadzhiev at UFC on ESPN 34. Borralho won by technical decision after an accidental foul on his opponent.

Borralho next faced prospect Armen Petrosyan at UFC on ESPN 39, winning via unanimous decision.

He next faced Makhmud Muradov at UFC 280, whom he defeated via unanimous decision.

Borralho faced Michał Oleksiejczuk at UFC on ESPN 45, winning via rear-naked choke in the second round.

Borralho was scheduled to face Nursulton Ruziboev on November 4, 2023, at UFC Fight Night 231. However, Ruziboev withdrew for unknown reasons and was replaced by Abusupiyan Magomedov. He won the fight via unanimous decision.

Borralho faced Paul Craig on May 4, 2024, at UFC 301. He won the fight by knockout in the second round. This fight earned him another Performance of the Night award.

Borralho faced former UFC Middleweight Championship challenger Jared Cannonier in the main event on August 24, 2024 at UFC on ESPN 62. He won the fight by unanimous decision. This fight earned him a Fight of the Night award.

Borralho successfully weighed in on August 15, 2025, as a backup for the middleweight championship bout between Dricus du Plessis and Khamzat Chimaev at UFC 319.

Borralho faced Nassourdine Imavov in the main event on September 6, 2025 at UFC Fight Night 258. He lost the fight by unanimous decision.

Borralho faced Reinier de Ridder on March 7, 2026 at UFC 326. He won the fight by unanimous decision.

Borralho was targeted to face Joe Pyfer on August 15, 2026 at UFC 330 but Borralho's rib injury prevented the fight from taking place.

Borralho faced Yousri Belgaroui on November 14, 2026 at UFC 334. He won the fight by unanimous decision.

== Grappling career ==
Borralho faced Brendan Allen on February 28, 2025 in a submission match at Karate Combat 53. He won the fight by unanimous decision.

== Personal life ==
Caio Borralho is married and has one son. He has been wearing eyeglasses since age of three, as he has been suffering from both myopia and astigmatism. Borralho's initial interest in MMA originated from the martial arts flicks of Jean-Claude Van Damme, Jackie Chan and Bruce Lee.

He currently resides in São Paulo, and completed his physical education degree at a university. Borralho also teaches martial arts classes at various gyms in the city of São Paulo.

He is a fan of superhero films, video games and anime; he also plays chess, which is why Borralho got the nickname "Rei dos Nerds" (King of Nerds).

== Championships and accomplishments ==
=== Mixed martial arts ===
- Ultimate Fighting Championship
  - Fight of the Night (One time) vs. Jared Cannonier
  - Performance of the Night (Two times) vs. Michał Oleksiejczuk and Paul Craig
  - Eighth longest win streak in UFC Middleweight division history (7)
- Future Fighting Championships
  - FFC Middleweight Championship (One time)
- MMA Fighting
  - 2024 Third Team MMA All-Star

== Mixed martial arts record ==
Professional record breakdown
22 matches	19 wins	2 losses
By knockout	5	0
By submission	4	0
By decision	10	2
No contests	1	

Res.	Record	Opponent	Method	Event	Date	Round	Time	Location	Notes
Win	19–2 (1)	Yousri Belgaroui	Decision (unanimous)	UFC 334	November 14, 2026	3	5:00	New York City, New York, United States	
Win	18–2 (1)	Reinier de Ridder	Decision (unanimous)	UFC 326	March 7, 2026	3	5:00	Las Vegas, Nevada, United States	
Loss	17–2 (1)	Nassourdine Imavov	Decision (unanimous)	UFC Fight Night: Imavov vs. Borralho	September 6, 2025	5	5:00	Paris, France	
Win	17–1 (1)	Jared Cannonier	Decision (unanimous)	UFC on ESPN: Cannonier vs. Borralho	August 24, 2024	5	5:00	Las Vegas, Nevada, United States	Fight of the Night.
Win	16–1 (1)	Paul Craig	KO (punches)	UFC 301	May 4, 2024	2	2:10	Rio de Janeiro, Brazil	Performance of the Night.
Win	15–1 (1)	Abusupiyan Magomedov	Decision (unanimous)	UFC Fight Night: Almeida vs. Lewis	November 4, 2023	3	5:00	São Paulo, Brazil	
Win	14–1 (1)	Michał Oleksiejczuk	Submission (rear-naked choke)	UFC on ESPN: Song vs. Simón	April 29, 2023	2	2:49	Las Vegas, Nevada, United States	Performance of the Night.
Win	13–1 (1)	Makhmud Muradov	Decision (unanimous)	UFC 280	October 22, 2022	3	5:00	Abu Dhabi, United Arab Emirates	
Win	12–1 (1)	Armen Petrosyan	Decision (unanimous)	UFC on ESPN: dos Anjos vs. Fiziev	July 9, 2022	3	5:00	Las Vegas, Nevada, United States	
Win	11–1 (1)	Gadzhi Omargadzhiev	Technical Decision (unanimous)	UFC on ESPN: Luque vs. Muhammad 2	April 16, 2022	3	3:56	Las Vegas, Nevada, United States	Return to Middleweight. Borralho was deducted one point in round 3 due to an accidental illegal knee which rendered Omargadzhiev unable to continue.
Win	10–1 (1)	Jesse Murray	TKO (punches)	Dana White's Contender Series 44	October 19, 2021	1	1:41	Las Vegas, Nevada, United States	Light Heavyweight debut.
Win	9–1 (1)	Aaron Jeffery	Decision (unanimous)	Dana White's Contender Series 41	September 28, 2021	3	5:00	Las Vegas, Nevada, United States	
Win	8–1 (1)	Wildemar Santos	Decision (unanimous)	Future FC 12	October 16, 2020	3	5:00	São Paulo, Brazil	Won the vacant FFC Middleweight Championship.
Win	7–1 (1)	Ykaro Queiroz	Decision (unanimous)	Future FC 10	December 6, 2019	3	5:00	São Paulo, Brazil	
Win	6–1 (1)	Otávio Sagás	Submission (guillotine choke)	Future FC 8	August 23, 2019	1	3:44	São Paulo, Brazil	
Win	5–1 (1)	Luiz Carlos Alves	Submission (anaconda choke)	Mega Fight Championship 2	June 22, 2019	1	2:03	Osasco, Brazil	
Win	4–1 (1)	Douglas Nascimento	TKO (punches)	Batalha MMA 14	September 8, 2018	1	1:13	São Paulo, Brazil	Middleweight debut.
NC	3–1 (1)	Raylander Marques	NC (accidental foul)	Vikings Fight Club 2	June 16, 2018	1	5:00	Campinas, Brazil	
Win	3–1	Luiz Carlos Alves	TKO (punches)	Arena Combat 2	September 16, 2017	1	0:20	São Sebastião, Brazil	
Win	2–1	Edson Junior	Submission (rear-naked choke)	Thunder Fight 9	September 30, 2016	3	3:05	São Paulo, Brazil	
Loss	1–1	João Carvalho	Decision (unanimous)	Bradar Fight 3	July 18, 2015	3	5:00	São Luís, Brazil	
Win	1–0	Cleiton Rafael	KO (punch)	Evocke Fight: Gods of War	December 13, 2014	1	1:48	São Paulo, Brazil	Welterweight debut.

== See also ==
- List of current UFC fighters
- List of Dana White's Contender Series alumni
- List of male mixed martial artists
