= Ulric Bokeme =

Swiss-Congolese kickboxer

- Born: Ulric Modju Bokeme; June 27, 1990 (age 36); Geneva, Switzerland
- Nickname: "Black Phantom"
- Height: 1.90 m (6 ft 3 in)
- Weight: 85 kg (187 lb; 13.4 st)
- Division: Middleweight
- Style: Kickboxing
- Stance: Orthodox
- Fighting out of: Lancy, Switzerland
- Team: Singto Gym
- Years active: 2015 - present

Kickboxing record
- Total: 44
- Wins: 36
- By knockout: 17
- Losses: 8
- By knockout: 4
- Draws: 0

Ulric Bokeme is a Swiss-Congolese kickboxer, currently signed with Glory. As of October 2022, he is ranked as the seventh best middleweight in the world by Beyond Kickboxing. Combat Press ranked him as a top ten middleweight between June 2018 and March 2022, peaking at #5.

== Kickboxing career ==
=== Enfusion ===
Bokeme started on sports as a football player and played on the Swiss National team, due knee injuries he had to give up on his football career. He started training kickboxing as a treatment for his injuries and decided to become a kickboxer.

Bokeme fought during La Nuit De L'Impact III, with his opponent being Yassine Ahaggan. He won the fight by a third-round knockout. Bokeme faced Jean Philippe Ghigo at Divonne Challenge 3 on April 15, 2017. He won the fight by decision.

Bokeme fought the former WBC Muaythai Light Heavyweight champion Cheick Sidibé in his Enfusion debut at Enfusion Live 33 on November 7, 2015. He won the fight by a unanimous decision. Bokeme faced Ibrahim El Boustati at Enfusion Live 46 on February 18, 2017, in his second promotional appearance. He won the fight by a first-round knockout.

Bokeme faced Mehdi Bouanane at Enfusion Live 41 on September 16, 2017. He won the fight by decision.

Bokeme fought a rematch with the former Enfusion three weight world champion Ibrahim El Boustati at Enfusion 56 on November 18, 2017. The fight ended in a controversial fashion after the first round, as the referee disqualified Bokeme for what he deemed to be a punch after the round ended, and which resulted in a knockdown of El Boustati. Upon review, the punch was deemed legal, with El Boustati pretending to be hit by an illegal punch. El Boustati would later apologize to Bokeme and congratulate him on his victory.

Bokeme faced Hicham El Gaoui at Enfusion Live 60 on February 10, 2018. He lost the fight by decision. Bokeme next faced Khalid El Bakouri at Enfusion Live 66 on May 5, 2018. He won the fight by unanimous decision.

=== Glory ===
Bokeme signed with Glory on August 23, 2019. He made his promotional debut against Yousri Belgaroui at Glory 69: Düsseldorf on October 12, 2019. Bokeme lost the fight by a unanimous decision.

He achieved his first Glory victory at Glory Collision 2 on December 21, 2019, when he won a unanimous decision against Kevin Van Heeckeren.

=== Return ===
Bokeme was booked to face Romain Falendry at AMC Collision I on June 11, 2022, following an eighteen-month absence from the sport. He won the fight by decision.

Bokeme was expected to face Serdar Yigit Eroglu at BKK World Kickboxing Championship on October 8, 2022, but he later withdrew from the bout due to visa issues.

Bokeme made his Glory return against Michael Boapeah at Glory: Collision 5 on June 17, 2023. He lost the fight by a first-round technical knockout.

Bokeme challenged the Glory Middleweight champion Donovan Wisse at Glory 92 on May 18, 2024. He lost the fight by split decision.

Bokeme faced Michael Boapeah at Glory 93 on July 20, 2024. He lost the fight by unanimous decision.

Bokeme faced Jailton Lutterbach at Senshi 26 - Gladiators on May 17, 2025. He won the fight by unanimous decision, after an extra fourth round was contested.

== Fight record ==
Professional kickboxing record
36 wins (17 (T)(KOs), 8 losses (3 (T)KOs)
Date	Result	Opponent	Event	Location	Method	Round	Time
2026-09-26	Loss	(Netherlands) Thian De Vries	8TKO #30	Tilburg, Netherlands	KO (left hook)	1	1:50
For the Enfusion World Cruiserweight (-88kg) Championship.
2026-07-11	Loss	(Nigeria) Joshua Akingbade	Senshi 32 - Middleweight Grand Prix, Semifinals	Varna, Bulgaria	TKO (punches)	1	1:32
2026-07-11	Win	(Portugal) Juri de Sousa	Senshi 32 - Middleweight Grand Prix, Quarterfnals	Varna, Bulgaria	Decision (split)	3	3:00
2025-12-06	Win	(France) Frangis Goma	Senshi 29	Varna, Bulgaria	Decision (unanimous)	3	3:00
2025-07-12	Win	(Switzerland) Fabian Lorito	Senshi 27	Varna, Bulgaria	Decision (unanimous)	3	3:00
2025-05-17	Win	(Brazil) Jailton Lutterbach	Senshi 26 - Gladiators	Plovdiv, Bulgaria	Ext. R. decision (unanimous)	4	3:00
2024-07-20	Loss	(Ghana) Michael Boapeah	Glory 93	Rotterdam, Netherlands	Decision (unanimous)	3	3:00
2024-05-18	Loss	(Suriname) Donovan Wisse	Glory 92	Rotterdam, Netherlands	Decision (split)	5	3:00
For the Glory Middleweight Championship.
2023-11-04	Win	(Turkey) Serkan Ozcaglayan	Glory: Collision 6	Arnhem, Netherlands	Decision (unanimous)	3	3:00
2023-06-17	Loss	(Ghana) Michael Boapeah	Glory: Collision 5	Rotterdam, Netherlands	TKO (retirement)	1	2:08
2022-06-11	Win	(France) Romain Falendry	AMC Collision I	Saint-Brieuc, France	Decision	3	3:00
2019-12-21	Win	(Netherlands) Kevin Van Heeckeren	Glory Collision 2	Arnhem, Netherlands	Decision (unanimous)	3	3:00
2019-10-12	Loss	(Tunisia) Yousri Belgaroui	Glory 69: Düsseldorf	Germany	Decision (unanimous)	3	3:00
2019-03-30	Loss	(Spain) Lorenzo Javier Jorge	Enfusion 81	Tenerife, Spain	KO (right hook)	1	0:20
2018-12-07	Win	(Belgium) Filip Verlinden	Enfusion Live 76/77	United Arab Emirates	Decision	3	3:00
2018-10-27	Win	(Turkey) Selahattin Sahin	Enfusion Live 73	Germany	Decision	3	3:00
2018-05-05	Win	(Morocco) Khalid El Bakouri	Enfusion Live 66	Spain	Decision (unanimous)	3	3:00
2018-02-10	Loss	(Morocco) Hicham El Gaoui	Enfusion Live 60	France	Decision	3	3:00
2017-11-18	Win	(Morocco) Ibrahim El Boustati	Enfusion Live 56	Netherlands	TKO (referee stoppage)	1	
2017-09-16	Win	(France) Mehdi Bouanane	Enfusion Live 41	Netherlands	Decision	3	3:00
2017-05-20	Win	(France) Yassine Ahaggan	La Nuit De L'Impact III	France	TKO (referee stoppage/straight right)	3	2:18
2017-04-15	Win	(France) Jean Philippe Ghigo	Divonne Challenge 3	France	Decision	3	3:00
2017-02-18	Win	(Morocco) Ibrahim El Boustati	Enfusion Live 46	Netherlands	KO (left hook)	1	2:51
2016-11-19	Win	(France) Mehdi Bouanane	WLF Rise Of Heroes	Switzerland	Decision	3	3:00
2016-01-29	Win	(France) Mehdi Bouanane	Soul Of Fighting	Switzerland	Decision	3	3:00
2015-11-07	Win	(France) Cheick Sidibé	Enfusion Live 33	Switzerland	Decision	3	3:00
2014	Win	(Switzerland) Erio Kusci	Best of Leone IV	Switzerland	TKO (retirement)	3	3:00
2014	Win	(Switzerland) Erio Brunner	Best of Leone	Switzerland	KO (punches)	1	1:23
2014	Win	(Switzerland) Eric Butcher	Brunner Show	Switzerland	KO	1	1:44
Legend: Win Loss Draw/no contest Notes

== See also ==
- List of male kickboxers
