= Cruiserweight (MMA) =

MMA weight class

The cruiserweight division in mixed martial arts sits between the light heavyweight division and the heavyweight division. It was approved by the Association of Boxing Commissions on July 26, 2017. The upper limit was set at 225 lb (102.1 kg).
