= Alexis Rufus =

English kickboxer

- Born: 28 April 1979 (age 47); London, England
- Other names: Ruthless
- Height: 1.62 m (5 ft 4 in)
- Weight: 56.7 kg (125 lb; 8.93 st)
- Division: Bantamweight; Featherweight
- Reach: 64.0 in (163 cm)
- Style: Muay Thai
- Stance: Orthodox
- Fighting out of: London, England
- Team: Stars Gym; Kiatphontip Gym
- Trainer: Mati Parks; Neil Dunn
- Years active: 2005–present

Kickboxing record
- Total: 36
- Wins: 27
- By knockout: 3
- Losses: 9
- By knockout: 1
- Draws: 0

Mixed martial arts record
- Total: 1
- Wins: 1

Other information
- Mixed martial arts record from Sherdog
- Last updated on: 22 February 2014

Alexis Rufus (born 28 April 1979) is an English Muay Thai kickboxer who competes in the bantamweight and featherweight divisions. Having turned professional in 2005, Rufus is a two-time European and five-time world champion.

== Early life ==
Alexis Rufus was raised with two brothers and has described herself as a tomboy growing up. She was involved in numerous sports in her childhood and, at eighteen, began studying fine art sculpture at university and then worked in the London art industry for ten years. She began training in Muay Thai when a friend suggested it as an alternative to normal workouts.

== Career ==
Having begun her professional career in 2005, Alexis Rufus suffered her first loss in a full contact kickboxing match on 7 April 2007 when she dropped a unanimous decision to Tracey Renow in Hove, England. The pair rematched in Hove on 24 November 2007 with the vacant Golden Belt Women's British -59.5 kg/131 lb Full Contact Championship on the line, and Renow again came out on top, this time by majority decision. Rufus then rebounded with a lengthy win streak and, on 13 September 2009, outpointed Lucy Payne at Muay Thai Addicts II in London to become the United Kingdom Muaythai Federation (UKMF) Women's English Featherweight (-57 kg/125 lb) Champion.

Now a reigning domestic champion, she soon moved up to international competition and beat Caterino Valerio by decision to take the ISKA Women's European Bantamweight (-54.5 kg/120 lb) Muay Thai title in Essex, England on 13 March 2010. Later that year, on 23 October, she became a world champion for the first time when she beat Malika Machtoune for the ISKA World Muay Thai title in Essex. Winning by technical knockout in round two, Rufus forced Machtoune's team to throw in the towel after cornering the Frenchwoman and delivering a barrage of unanswered knees and punches. Rufus ended out 2010 with a unanimous decision win over Jessica Gladstone, who she has described as her toughest opponent, at Journey Fight Series I in Calgary, Alberta, Canada on 13 November.

On 19 March 2011, Rufus took on Lorena Klijn for the vacant IKF Women's World Bantamweight (-55.4 kg/122 lb) Muay Thai title in Essex. The first two rounds were close but Rufus began to pull away in the third and inflicted Klijn's first defeat by unanimous decision. Shortly after, she won her third world title when he beat Joanne Calderwood for the WKA belt. Challenging for the WPMF Women's World Featherweight (-57.1 kg/126 lb) Championship, Rufus suffered her first defeat in four years when she lost to Mesa Tor Buamas on points at the Queen's Cup 2011 in Bangkok, Thailand on 11 August 2011.

After rebounding with a UD win over Mellony Geugjes at Stars Fight Night in London on 27 November 2011, Alexis Rufus won the WPMF Women's World Bantamweight (-53.5 kg/118 lb) Championship in Thailand in March 2012. She fought Kate Heuston for the vacant WMC Women's Intercontinental Featherweight (-57.1 kg/126 lb) title at Ignition Muay Thai in Perth, Australia on 22 April 2012, losing a UD. This would kick off a three-fight losing streak for Rufus as she then lost two decisions to Sawsing Sor Sopit at Rangsit Stadium in Pathum Thani, Thailand in May and then Farseethong Sithsorung in a WPMF world featherweight title match at the King's Cup 2012 on 27 July 2012. She got back in the win column on 23 September 2012 when she beat Ilsury Hendrikse via UD for the WMC Women's World Bantamweight (-53.5 kg/118 lb) Championship, her fifth world title belt, at Stars Fight Night 3 in London. On 1 December 2012, she beat Kate Stables on points at Smash Muay Thai 2 in Liverpool, England.

Rufus was knocked out for the first time in her career when she lost to Tiffany van Soest in the co-main event of Lion Fight 8 in Las Vegas, Nevada, United States on 25 January 2013. It was a closely contested affair up until round four when van Soest rocked Rufus with a high kick before dropping her for good with a right hand. Competing under Oriental kickboxing rules, she lost for the second time on the trot when she dropped a unanimous decision to Iman Barlow after a back-and-forth fight in which the inaugural Enfusion Live Women's -54 kg/119 lb Championship was up for grabs. Rufus was expected to fight Christi Brereton Smash Muay Thai 7 in Liverpool on 21 December 2013 but Brereton withdrew after having issues with the promoter and was replaced by Tanya Merrett. Rufus defeated Merrett on points.

Alexis Rufus and Christi Brereton finally met in Telford, England on 22 February 2014 at Muay Thai Unleashed II, with Brereton winning by unanimous decision to take the previously vacant UKMF Women's British Bantamweight (-55 kg/121 lb) Championship.

== Championships and awards ==
=== Kickboxing ===
- International Kickboxing Federation
  - International Kickboxing Federation (IKF) Women's World Bantamweight (-55.4 kg/122 lb) Muay Thai Championship (One time)
- International Sport Karate Association
  - 2011 ISKA Female Fighter of the Year
  - ISKA Women's European Bantamweight (-54.5 kg/120 lb) Muay Thai Championship (One time)
  - ISKA Women's World Muay Thai Championship (One time)
- 'United Kingdom Muaythai Federationhttps://ukmtf.com/
  - UKMF Women's English Featherweight (-57 kg/125 lb) Championship (One time)

https://ukmtf.com/

  - UKMF Women's British Championship (One time)
- World Kickboxing Association
  - WKA Women's World Muay Thai Championship (One time)
- World Muaythai Council
  - WMC Women's European Championship (One time)
  - WMC Women's World Bantamweight (-53.5 kg/118 lb) Championship (One time)
- World Professional Muaythai Federation
  - WPMF Women's World Bantamweight (-53.5 kg/118 lb) Championship (One time)

== Mixed martial arts record ==
Professional record breakdown
1 match	1 win	0 losses
By knockout	0	0
By submission	0	0
By decision	1	0

Res.	Record	Opponent	Method	Event	Date	Round	Time	Location	Notes
Win	1–0	Shalinq Roberts	Decision (majority)	Cage Fight Series: D-Day	12 May 2007	3	5:00	Ipswich, England	

== Kickboxing record ==
Kickboxing record
27 wins (3 KOs), 9 losses, 0 draws
Date	Result	Opponent	Event	Location	Method	Round	Time	Record
2014-02-22	Loss	(England) Christi Brereton	Muay Thai Unleashed II	Telford, England	Decision (unanimous)	5	3:00	27-9
For the UKMF Women's British Bantamweight (-55 kg/121 lb) Championship.
2013-12-21	Win	(Wales) Tanya Merrett	Smash Muay Thai 7	Liverpool, England	Decision	5		27-8
2013-03-30	Loss	(England) Iman Barlow	Enfusion Live 3	London, England	Decision (unanimous)	5	3:00	26-8
For the Enfusion Live Women's -54 kg/119 lb Championship.
2013-01-25	Loss	(United States) Tiffany van Soest	Lion Fight 8	Las Vegas, Nevada, USA	KO (left high kick and punches)	4	2:05	26-7
2012-12-01	Win	(England) Kate Stables	Smash Muay Thai 2	Liverpool, England	Decision (unanimous)	5		26-6
2012-09-23	Win	(Netherlands) Ilsury Hendrikse	Stars Fight Night 3	London, England	Decision (unanimous)	5	3:00	25-6
Wins the WMC Women's World Bantamweight (-53.5 kg/118 lb) Championship.
2012-07-27	Loss	(Thailand) Farseethong Sithsorung	King's Cup 2012	Thailand	Decision (unanimous)	5	3:00	24-6
For the WPMF Women's World Featherweight (-57.1 kg/126 lb) Championship.
2012-05-00	Loss	(Thailand) Sawsing Sor Sopit	Rangsit Stadium	Pathum Thani, Thailand	Decision	5		24-5
2012-04-22	Loss	(Australia) Kate Heuston	Ignition Muay Thai	Perth, Australia	Decision	5		24-4
For the WMC Women's Intercontinental Featherweight (-57.1 kg/126 lb) Championship.
2012-03-00	Win	(Thailand)		Thailand	Decision	5	2:00	24-3
Wins the WPMF Women's World Bantamweight (-53.5 kg/118 lb) Championship.
2011-11-27	Win	(Netherlands) Mellony Geugjes	Stars Fight Night	London, England	Decision (unanimous)	5	2:00	
2011-08-11	Loss	(Thailand) Mesa Tor Buamas	Queen's Cup 2011	Bangkok, Thailand	Decision	5		
For the WPMF Women's World Featherweight (-57.1 kg/126 lb) Championship.
2011-00-00	Win	(Scotland) Joanne Calderwood	Shin Kick Promotions, WFN	Woking, England	Decision			
Wins the WKA Women's World Muay Thai Championship.
2011-03-19	Win	(Netherlands) Lorena Klijn	Keddle's Promotions: Championship Muay Thai	Essex, England	Decision (unanimous)	5	3:00	
Wins the IKF Women's World Bantamweight (-55.4 kg/122 lb) Muay Thai Championship.
2010-11-13	Win	(Canada) Jessica Gladstone	Journey Fight Series I	Calgary, Alberta, Canada	Decision (unanimous)	5	3:00	
2010-10-23	Win	(France) Malika Machtoune	Keddle's Promotions	Essex, England	TKO (punches and knees)	2	0:26	
Wins the ISKA Women's World Muay Thai Championship.
2010-03-13	Win	(Portugal) Caterino Valerio	Keddle's Promotions	Essex, England	Decision	5		
Wins the ISKA Women's European Bantamweight (-54.5 kg/120 lb) Muay Thai Championship.
2009-09-13	Win	(England) Lucy Payne	Muay Thai Addicts II	London, England	Decision	5	2:00	
Wins the UKMF Women's English Featherweight (-57 kg/125 lb) Championship.
2008-11-23	Win	(England) Jo Abrehart	Capital Punishment: Battle of Waterloo	London, England				
2007-11-24	Loss	(England) Tracey Renow	21st Century Promotions: Championship Kickboxing	Hove, England	Decision (majority)			
For the Golden Belt Women's British -59.5 kg/131 lb Full Contact Championship.
2007-04-07	Loss	(England) Tracey Renow	21st Century Promotions: Championship Kickboxing	Hove, England	Decision (unanimous)			
Legend: Win Loss Draw/No contest Notes
