= Tiffany van Soest =

American kickboxer (born 1989)

- Born: Tiffany Lynn van Soest; March 20, 1989 (age 37); Torrance, California, United States
- Other names: Time Bomb
- Height: 1.63 m (5 ft 4 in)
- Weight: 56.7 kg (125 lb; 8.93 st)
- Division: Flyweight; Bantamweight
- Reach: 64 in (160 cm)
- Style: Muay Thai, Shōrin-ryū Karate
- Stance: Orthodox
- Fighting out of: Amsterdam, Netherlands
- Team: Blue Ocean Muay Thai; FFC Bijlmer
- Trainer: Alexander Palma; Lucien Carbin
- Rank: 2nd Degree Black Belt in Shōrin-ryū Karate
- Years active: 2009–2023

Kickboxing record
- Total: 34
- Wins: 26
- By knockout: 10
- Losses: 6
- By knockout: 0
- Draws: 2

Mixed martial arts record
- Total: 3
- Wins: 1
- By decision: 1
- Losses: 2
- By submission: 2

Other information
- University: CSU San Marcos
- Mixed martial arts record from Sherdog
- Last updated on: July 4, 2014

Tiffany Lynn van Soest (born March 20, 1989) is a retired American Muay Thai kickboxer who competed in the bantamweight division. She is the former two-time Glory Super Bantamweight Champion and a two-weight Lion Fight champion.

Originally a Shōrin-ryū karate practitioner, van Soest began Muay Thai at the age of eighteen and was both a state and national titlist as an amateur before turning professional in 2011. Prior to her switch to kickboxing, van Soest was the two-time Lion Fight Women's Featherweight and one-time Lion Fight Women's Super Bantamweight champion. As a professional kickboxer, van Soest twice captured the Glory Women's Super Bantamweight championship, amassing five defenses across two reigns, only suffering losses to fellow pound-for-pound ranked Anissa Meksen and Denise Kielholtz.

Combat Press ranked her as a pound-for-pound talent between November 2016 and September 2023, when she retired from professional competition. In 2019, Combat Press voted her the Female Fighter of the Year.

== Early life ==
Tiffany van Soest was born in Torrance, California, and raised in Riverside, California. Her paternal grandfather was a Dutch-Indonesian born in Semarang, in the former Dutch East Indies. He immigrated to the Netherlands in the early 1950s and met his ethnically Dutch wife in the Hague, after which they both moved to the United States. Van Soest is of maternal Austrian and Polish descent. The first sports she became involved in were soccer at the age of five and later Shōrin-ryū karate at eight. She earned the rank of second degree black belt under Joey Pagliuso at the United States Karate Organization at seventeen, but was unable to compete until she was eighteen because her parents wouldn't let her. When she did start competitive karate, she took multiple titles at state, national and world levels.

Van Soest stopped practicing martial arts for a short time to attend California State University San Marcos where she earned a bachelor's degree in kinesiology, and played on the soccer team for two seasons. However, van Soest was soon drawn back to martial arts and found Muay Thai while living in San Diego, California.

== Muay Thai and kickboxing career ==
=== Amateur career ===
Tiffany Van Soest began fighting in amateur Muay Thai in 2009 and had her first title fight on August 14, 2010, at the San Mateo Event Center in San Mateo, California, challenging IKF Women's Amateur World Muay Thai Bantamweight (55.45 kg/122.2 lb) Champion Jenna Castillo for her belt. After what was called the "Fight of the Night", van Soest lost the challenge to Castillo by unanimous decision on scores of 50–44, 49–45 and 49–45. She soon captured the United States Muay Thai Association Women's Amateur California Featherweight Championship and then defeated Gabriela Lemus by technical knockout (TKO) in the second round of their contest in Pala, California on October 2, 2010, to claim the International Amateur Muay Thai Federation Women's United States Featherweight title. Her original opponent was to be Tandi Schaffer, but Schafer injured her hand in a previous bout and was forced to withdraw. Facing her first foreign opponent, van Soest fought to a draw with China's Cong Wang in Las Vegas, Nevada, on November 16, 2010.

She debuted as an amateur in mixed martial arts (MMA) on February 26, 2011, at the Road to WCK event in Pala where she TKO'd Kate McGray with a combination of a left high kick and standing-to-ground punches early in the second round. She had her first international bout in her second appearance in amateur MMA as she lost to Jin Tang via submission due to a triangle choke inside the first round in Nanning, China, on June 18, 2011. The fight is notable for being the first female MMA match to be held in mainland China.

=== Lion Fight ===
==== Early career ====
After amassing a record of 10–1–1 as an amateur nak muay, Van Soest turned professional on October 22, 2011, and was initially set to rematch Cong Wang in her pro debut in Las Vegas. However, Wang was unable to compete and replaced by four-time world champion Lena Ovchynnikova. Van Soest won by TKO after Ovchynnikova retired in her corner with a broken hand at the end of round two. The pair were scheduled to rematch on July 21, 2012, in Croatia, but it never came to fruition. In her sophomore appearance as a pro, van Soest defeated Vivian Leung by unanimous decision at Lion Fight: Battle in the Desert 5 in Las Vegas on February 25, 2012. She then followed this up with another unanimous points victory over Heidi Otterbein at Lion Fight 6 on May 12, 2012.

In just her fourth outing as a pro, she was given the chance to fight for the vacant International Karate and Kickboxing Council Women's World Super Bantamweight Muay Thai Championship on August 18, 2012, in Pala. Facing Jemyma Betrian after her original foe Hilary Mack pulled out, van Soest and her Dutch-based Curaçaoan opponent put on a back-and-forth "Fight of the Night" display. Van Soest scored a knockdown with a spinning back fist in the second round, and Betrian was docked a point in the third for rabbit punching. Despite this, two judges scored the bout a draw and the other in the favour of van Soest, rendering the match a majority draw.

On October 13, 2012, van Soest took the WBC Muaythai Women's International Super Bantamweight (55.338 kg/122 lb) title from the previously undefeated Jeri Sitzes at Lion Fight 7 in Las Vegas. After a slow first two rounds, she began taking the lead in the third, scoring with low kicks and punches to take the unanimous decision. Having already fought three times for the organization, she then signed a multi-fight contract with Lion Fight Promotions the following month.

In the co-main event of Lion Fight 8, the promotion's first event televised nationally, she faced Alexis Rufus on January 25, 2013. It was a closely contested affair up until round four when van Soest rocked Rufus with a high kick before dropping her for good with a right hand. Van Soest was again in the co-main event at Lion Fight 9 on March 15, 2013, as she took a wide unanimous decision over Natalie Yip, who was debuting as a professional.

==== First featherweight title reign ====
Van Soest had no trouble defeating Lucy Payne in a bout for the inaugural Lion Fight Women's Featherweight (56.7 kg/125 lb) Championship at Lion Fight 10 in Las Vegas on July 26, 2013. Despite giving up the height and reach advantage, she was able to get inside and hurt Payne, cornering the Englishwoman while landing a flurry of punches and elbows. Payne dropped to a knee, forcing the referee to step in and halt the bout and give Soest the TKO win in round one.

In a non-title affair at Lion Fight 12 in Las Vegas on November 1, 2013, van Soest completely outclassed Magali Foroni. The Frenchwoman offered little to no offense for two rounds until her corner threw in the towel midway through the third. Van Soest lost her Lion Fight title at her first attempted defence, losing to Caley Reece in the Lion Fight 13 headliner on February 7, 2014. Although it was a close fight, Reece's use of the clinch and sweeps saw her take a split decision and hand van Soest her first professional defeat.

Van Soest rematched Lucy Payne on March 23, 2014, at Lion Fight 15, which was held in Ledyard, Connecticut. It was the promotion's first card outside Las Vegas. Van Soest used chopping low kicks to slow Payne's movement en route to winning a unanimous decision. Van Soest defeated Sindy Huyer via TKO fifty-six seconds into round five at Lion Fight 16 in Las Vegas on July 4, 2014. Referee Junichiro Kamijo stopped the bout after van Soest landed a front kick to Huyer's face, which broke Huyer's nose, quickly followed with a left hook to the jaw. After a failed excursion into kickboxing, which saw her challenge and lose to the Enfusion 57 kg champion Denise Kielholtz by unanimous decision, van Soest was booked to face Chajmaa Bellakhal at Lion Fight 21 on March 27, 2015. She won the fight by unanimous decision.

==== Second featherweight title reign ====
Her 3–0 run with the promotion earned van Soeast the right to challenge Bernise Alldis for the Lion Fight Women's Featherweight (56.7 kg/125 lb) Championship at Lion Fight 22 on May 22, 2015. She won the fight by a fourth-round technical knockout. The bout was stopped by the ringside physician due to a massive gash across Alldis' right cheek. van Soest made her fist title defense against Poland's Martyna Krol at Lion Fight 23 on July 31, 2015. She retained the title by unanimous decision. After successfully making the first defense of her featherweight title, van Soest moved down a weight class in order to face Ashley Nichols for the vacant Lion Fight Women's Super Bantamweight (54.4 kg/120 lb) Championship at Lion Fight 27 on January 29, 2016. She won the fight by unanimous decision. van Soest complained of not having received payment from the organization following the fight, which was later clarified by Lion Fight, who stated: "There was an issue when the check was deposited and this morning, payment was wired to her account to resolve the matter".

=== Glory ===
==== First super bantamweight title reign ====
On April 6, 2016, it was announced that van Soest had signed with Glory and would compete in their super bantamweight division. Immediately after signing with the promotion, van Soest was placed in the 2016 Glory Super Bantamweight Tournament, which happened across two different events, with the semifinals and finals taking place on the same day. van Soest faced Esma Hasshass in the quarterfinals at Glory 30: Los Angeles on May 13, 2016. She won her promotional debut by unanimous decision. van Soest faced Jessica Gladstone in the penultimate bout of the tournament at Glory 36: Oberhausen on December 10, 2016. She her second fight with Glory by unanimous decision as well. Advancing to the finals, van Soest faced the ISKA and WKN World champion Amel Dehby. She captured the Glory Women's Super Bantamweight Championship by unanimous decision, after winning her second fight of the day by unanimous decision. Winning this tournament earned van Soest the 2016 Glory "Newcomer of the Year" award.

van Soest made her first Glory title defense against the former WLF 55 kg champion Meryem Uslu at Glory 44: Chicago on August 25, 2017. Uslu stepped in as a replacement for Funda Alkayiş. van Soest won the fight by a fourth-round technical knockout, her first stoppage win with the promotion. van Soest made her second title defense against the former ISKA, WAKO and Kunlun Fight champion Anissa Meksen at Glory 48: New York on December 1, 2017. She lost her title by unanimous decision, with scores of 49–46, 49–46, 48–47.

==== Second super bantamweight title reign ====
van Soest faced Sofia Olofsson at Glory 55: New York on July 20, 2018. She won the fight by split decision. This victory earned van Soest to face Anissa Meksen in a rematch for the Glory Women's Super Bantamweight Championship at Glory 64: Strasbourg on March 9, 2019. Meksen won the fight by split decision.

Despite having lost to Anissa Meksen twice, the close nature of their second meeting was enough for Glory to book a trilogy match at Glory 71: Chicago on November 22, 2019. van Soest regained the title after winning the fight by unanimous decision, with scores of 48–47, 48–47, 49–46. van Soest made the first defense of her second reign against Aline Pereira at Glory 77: Rotterdam on January 30, 2021. She won the fight by unanimous decision. van Soest made her second title defense against Manazo Kobayashi at Glory 80 on March 19, 2022. She won the fight by a fifth-round technical knockout. van Soest was booked to make her third title defense against the WAKO-Pro World 56 kg champion Sarah Moussaddak at Glory: Collision 4 on October 8, 2022. She retained the title by a controversial unanimous decision.

van Soest made her fourth and final Glory Women's Super Bantamweight title defense in a re-match against Sarah Moussaddak at Glory 88 on September 9, 2023, this time winning by knockout in the second round. During the post-fight interviews, van Soest confirmed her previous announcement that this was her last fight, as she was retiring from combat sports.

== Mixed martial arts career ==
Van Soest made her Invicta debut on September 23, 2016, against Kalyn Schwartz at Invicta FC 19: Maia vs. Modafferi. She lost the fight via rear-naked choke on round two.

Her next fight came on May 20, 2017, facing Christine Ferea at Invicta FC 23: Porto vs. Niedźwiedź. She won the fight via unanimous decision.

== Championships and awards ==
=== Karate ===
- United States Karate Organization
  - USKA California Championship
  - USKA United States Championship
  - USKA World Championship

=== Kickboxing / Muay Thai ===
- CombatPress.com
  - 2019 Female Fighter of the Year
- AwakeningFighters.com
  - 2015 KO/TKO of the Year vs. Bernise Alldis
  - 2013 Personality of the Year
  - 2013 KO/TKO of the Year vs. Alexis Rufus
- International Amateur Muay Thai Federation
  - IAMTF Women's United States Featherweight Championship
- Lion Fight
  - Lion Fight Women's Featherweight (56.7 kg/125 lb) Championship
- Muay Thai Authority
  - 2013 North American Female Fighter of the Year
  - 2012 North American Breakthrough Fighter of the Year
- United States Muay Thai Association
  - USMTA Women's Amateur California Featherweight Championship
- World Boxing Council Muaythai
  - WBC Muaythai Women's International Super Bantamweight (55.338 kg/122 lb) Championship
- Glory
  - Glory Women's Super Bantamweight (55.38 kg/122 lb) Championship (Two times, former)
    - Five successful title defenses (across two reigns)
  - 2016 Glory "Newcomer of the Year" Award

== Kickboxing record ==
Professional Kickboxing record
26 Wins (10 (T)KOs), 6 Losses, 2 Draws
Date	Result	Opponent	Event	Location	Method	Round	Time	Record
2023-09-09	Win	(France) Sarah Moussaddak	Glory 88	Paris, France	KO (High kick)	2	1:47	26–6–2
Defends the Glory Women's Super Bantamweight (55.38 kg/122 lb) Championship.
2022-10-08	Win	(France) Sarah Moussaddak	Glory: Collision 4	Arnhem, Netherlands	Decision (Unanimous)	5	3:00	25–6–2
Defends the Glory Women's Super Bantamweight (55.38 kg/122 lb) Championship.
2022-03-19	Win	(Japan) Manazo Kobayashi	Glory 80	Hasselt, Belgium	TKO (Spinning back kick)	5	2:56	24–6–2
Defends the Glory Women's Super Bantamweight (55.38 kg/122 lb) Championship.
2021-01-30	Win	(Brazil) Aline Pereira	Glory 77: Rotterdam	Rotterdam, Netherlands	Decision (unanimous)	5	3:00	23–6–2
Defends the Glory Women's Super Bantamweight (55.38 kg/122 lb) Championship.
2019-11-22	Win	(France) Anissa Meksen	Glory 71: Chicago	Chicago, Illinois	Decision (unanimous)	5	3:00	22–6–2
Wins the Glory Women's Super Bantamweight (55.38 kg/122 lb) Championship.
2019-03-09	Loss	(France) Anissa Meksen	Glory 64: Strasbourg	Strasbourg, France	Decision (split)	5	3:00	21–6–2
For the Glory Women's Super Bantamweight (55.38 kg/122 lb) Championship.
2018-07-20	Win	(Sweden) Sofia Olofsson	Glory 55: New York	New York City, New York	Decision (split)	3	3:00	21–5–2
2017-12-01	Loss	(France) Anissa Meksen	Glory 48: New York	New York City, New York	Decision (unanimous)	5	3:00	20–5–2
Loses the Glory Women's Super Bantamweight (55.38 kg/122 lb) Championship.
2017-08-25	Win	(Germany) Meryem Uslu	Glory 44: Chicago	Hoffman Estates, Illinois	TKO (punches)	4	0:36	20–4–2
Retains the Glory Women's Super Bantamweight (55.38 kg/122 lb) Championship.
2016-12-10	Win	(France) Amel Dehby	Glory 36: Oberhausen, Final	Oberhausen, Germany	Decision (unanimous)	3	3:00	19–4–2
Wins the Glory Women's Super Bantamweight (55.38 kg/122 lb) Championship.
2016-12-10	Win	(Canada) Jessica Gladstone	Glory 36: Oberhausen, Semi Finals	Oberhausen, Germany	Decision (unanimous)	3	3:00	18–4–2
2016-05-13	Win	(Morocco) Esma Hasshass	Glory 30: Los Angeles, Quarter Finals	Ontario, California, USA	Decision (unanimous)	3	3:00	17–4–2
2016-01-29	Win	(Canada) Ashley Nichols	Lion Fight 27	Temecula, California, USA	Decision (unanimous)	5	3:00	16–4–2
Won the vacant Lion Fight Women's Super Bantamweight (54.4 kg/120 lb) Championship.
2015-07-31	Win	(Poland) Martyna Krol	Lion Fight 23	Temecula, California, USA	Decision (Unanimous)	5	3:00	15–4–2
Retains the Lion Fight Women's Featherweight (56.7 kg/125 lb) Championship.
2015-05-22	Win	(England) Bernise Alldis	Lion Fight 22	Henderson, Nevada, USA	TKO (stoppage due to cut)	4	1:44	14–4–2
Wins the Lion Fight Women's Featherweight (56.7 kg/125 lb) Championship.
2015-03-27	Win	(Netherlands) Chajmaa Bellakhal	Lion Fight 21	Temecula, California, USA	Decision (unanimous)	5	3:00	13–4–2
2014-11-23	Loss	(Netherlands) Denise Kielholtz	Enfusion Live 22	Groningen, Netherlands	Decision (unanimous)	5	3:00	12–4–2
For the Enfusion Live Women's −57 kg/126 lb Championship.
2014-07-04	Win	(Italy) Sindy Huyer	Lion Fight 16	Las Vegas, Nevada, USA	TKO (left front kick)	5	0:56	12–3–2
2014-05-23	Win	(England) Lucy Payne	Lion Fight 15	Ledyard, Connecticut, USA	Decision (unanimous)	5	3:00	11–3–2
2014-02-07	Loss	(Australia) Caley Reece	Lion Fight 13	Las Vegas, Nevada, USA	Decision (split)	5	3:00	10–3–2
Loses the Lion Fight Women's Featherweight (56.7 kg/125 lb) Championship.
2013-11-01	Win	(France) Magali Foroni	Lion Fight 12	Las Vegas, Nevada, USA	TKO (corner stoppage)	3	2:15	10–2–2
Retains the Lion Fight Women's Featherweight (56.7 kg/125 lb) Championship.
2013-07-26	Win	(England) Lucy Payne	Lion Fight 10	Las Vegas, Nevada, USA	TKO (punches and elbows)	1	2:30	9–2–2
Wins the Lion Fight Women's Featherweight (56.7 kg/125 lb) Championship.
2013-03-15	Win	(Canada) Natalie Yip	Lion Fight 9	Las Vegas, Nevada, USA	Decision (unanimous)	5	3:00	8–2–2
2013-01-25	Win	(England) Alexis Rufus	Lion Fight 8	Las Vegas, Nevada, USA	KO (left high kick and punches)	4	2:05	7–2–2
2012-10-13	Win	(United States) Jeri Sitzes	Lion Fight 7	Las Vegas, Nevada, USA	Decision (unanimous)	5	3:00	6–2–2
Wins the WBC Muaythai Women's International Super Bantamweight (55.338 kg/122 lb) Championship.
2012-08-18	Draw	(Netherlands) Jemyma Betrian	WCK Muay Thai: Nakamoto vs. Kitchen	Pala, California, USA	Draw (majority)	5	3:00	5–2–2
For the IKKC Women's World Super Bantamweight Muay Thai Championship.
2012-05-12	Win	(Canada) Heidi Otterbein	Lion Fight 6	Las Vegas, Nevada, USA	Decision (unanimous)	5	3:00	5–2–1
2012-02-25	Win	(United States) Vivian Leung	Lion Fight: Battle in the Desert 5	Las Vegas, Nevada, USA	Decision (unanimous)	5	3:00	4–2–1
2011-10-22	Win	(Ukraine) Lena Ovchynnikova	WCK Muay Thai	Las Vegas, Nevada, USA	TKO (broken hand)	2	3:00	3–2–1
2010-11-13	Draw	(China) Wang Cong	Wu Lin Feng: Las Vegas Spectacular	Las Vegas, Nevada, USA	Draw (majority)	3	3:00	2–2–1
2010-10-02	Win	(United States) Gabriela Lemus	WCK Muay Thai	Pala, California, USA	TKO	2		2–2
Wins the IAMTF Women's United States Featherweight Championship.
2010-08-14	Loss	(United States) Jenna Castillo	Fight Night at the Mansion	San Mateo, California, USA	Decision (unanimous)	5		1–2
For the IKF Women's Amateur World Muay Thai Bantamweight (55.45 kg/122.2 lb) Championship.
2010-01-02	Loss	(China) Gong Yanli	Wu Lin Feng: China vs USA	Zhengzhou, China	Decision (unanimous)	3	2:00	1–1
2009-11-20	Win	(United States) Malia Spanyol	Battle of the Champions	San Diego, California, USA				1–0
Legend: Win Loss Draw/No contest Notes

== Mixed martial arts record ==
Professional record breakdown
3 matches	1 win	2 losses
By submission	0	2
By decision	1	0

Res.	Record	Opponent	Method	Event	Date	Round	Time	Location	Notes
Win	1–2	Christine Ferea	Decision (unanimous)	Invicta FC 23: Porto vs. Niedźwiedź	May 20, 2017	3	5:00	Kansas City, Missouri, United States	
Loss	0–2	Kalyn Schwartz	Submission (rear-naked choke)	Invicta FC 19: Maia vs. Modafferi	September 23, 2016	2	2:08	Kansas City, Missouri, United States	
Loss	0–1	Jin Tang	Submission (triangle choke)	WBC Muay Thai - MMA in China	June 18, 2011	1	2:25	Nanning, China	

== See also ==
- List of female kickboxers
