= Lucy Payne =

- Born: 4 February 1992 (age 34); Penzance, Cornwall, England
- Other names: The Princess of Pain
- Nationality: English
- Height: 6 ft 0 in (1.83 m)
- Weight: 126 lb (57 kg; 9.0 st)
- Division: Featherweight
- Reach: 70.0 in (178 cm)
- Style: Muay Thai
- Fighting out of: Touchgloves Gym
- Trainer: Nathan Kitchen

Kickboxing record
- Total: 30
- Wins: 22
- Losses: 8

Lucy Payne (born 4 February 1992) is an English female kickboxer and muay thai fighter based in Cornwall. She is a former WBC Muaythai World Featherweight champion and is the #2 featherweight in the world by WBC Muaythai, as of April 2020.

== Titles ==
- 2015 – World Boxing Council Muaythai
- 2014 – GBMA Muay Thai Golden Belt Title, 57 kg
- 2013 – Awakening Muay Thai 57 kg World Champion (1 Defense)
- 2012 – KORE MMA Bantamweight Muay Thai Champion
- 2012 – ISKA K1 European Title Contender
- 2011 – International Kickboxing Federation (IKF) British Champion
- 2010 – UKMF British Muay Thai Champion
- 2010 – ISKA English Champion
- 2010 – International Kickboxing Federation (IKF) English Featherweight Muay Thai Champion
- 2009 – Southwest Area Champion
- 2009 – Ringmasters Tournament Champion
- 2009 – IFMA European Muay Thai Championships

== Kickboxing record ==
Kickboxing Record (incomplete)
28 Wins, 10 Loss, 0 Draws
Date	Result	Opponent	Event	Location	Method	Round	Time	Record
23 March 2019	Loss	(England) Niamh Kinehan	Yokkao 38	Bolton, England	Decision	5	2:00	
18 November 2017	Loss	(Thailand) Chommanee Sor Taehiran	World Muay Thai Angels Tournament 2, Quarter-Finals	Bangkok, Thailand	Decision	5	2:00	
9 April 2017	Win	(Greece) Fani Peloumpi	World Muay Thai Angels Tournament 2, First Round	Bangkok, Thailand	Decision	5	2:00	
26 November 2016	Win	(New Zealand) Gentiane Lupi	Rebellion Muay Thai XIII	Melbourne, Australia	Decision (Unanimous)	5	2:00	
22 October 2016	Win	(Australia) Leonie Macks	Siam Pro Muay Thai Show, Tournament Final	Clontarf, Australia	Decision (Unanimous)	5	3:00	
Won the Siam Pro Muay Thai tournament title -60 kg.
22 October 2016	Win	(Australia) Melina Yung	Siam Pro Muay Thai Show, Tournament Semi-Finals	Clontarf, Australia	Decision (Unanimous)	5	2:00	
26 August 2016	Win	(Australia) Sam Brown	Yokkao Next Generation	Melbourne, Australia	TKO (Knees)	3		
25 March 2016	Loss	(Australia) Leonie Macks	Siam 2 Sydney Promotions	Sydney, Australia	Decision	5	2:00	
12 March 2016	Win	(Australia) Leonie Macks	Siam 2 Sydney Promotions	Sydney, Australia	Decision	5	2:00	
13 June 2015	Win	(Morocco) Chajmaa Bellakhal	Smash 11	Leeds, England	TKO (Retirement)	2	3:00	
For vacant WBC Featherweight World title.
14 September 2014	Win	(Wales) Tanya Merret	Fight Night Cardiff	Cardiff, Wales	TKO (Body Kick)	1		
23 May 2014	Loss	(United States) Tiffany van Soest	Lion Fight 15	Mashantucket, Connecticut, United States	Decision (Unanimous)	5	3:00	
23 March 2014	Win	(France) Victoria Lomax	Judgement Day 2	Cornwall, England	TKO	2		
Retained the Awakening title -57 kg.
26 July 2013	Loss	(United States) Tiffany van Soest	Lion Fight 10	Las Vegas, Nevada, United States	TKO (elbows)	1	2:50	
For the vacant Lion Fight Featherweight world title.
24 March 2013	Win	(Wales) Tanya Merret	Fast & Furious 2	Cornwall, England	Decision (Unanimous)	5	3:00	
Won the inaugural Awakening title -57 kg.
14 February 2013	Loss	(France) Sandra Sevilla	Best of Siam III	Paris, France	Decision (Split)	3	3:00	
2 December 2012	Loss	(Netherlands) Denise Kielholtz	Enfusion 3: Trial of the Gladiators, Final	Ljubljana, Slovenia	Decision (Majority)	3	3:00	
For The Enfusion 3 Ladies Team Captains tournament title -57 kg.
2 December 2012	Win	(Morocco) Chajmaa Bellakhal	Enfusion 3: Trial of the Gladiators, Semi Finals	Ljubljana, Slovenia	Decision	3	3:00	
29 April 2012	Loss	(South Africa) Bonny van Oortmerssen	Pure Force 13: Domination	England	Decision (Unanimous)	5	3:00	
For the ISKA European title 58.2kg.
24 March 2012	Win	(Germany) Meryem Uslu	KORE MMA	Cornwall, England	Decision (Unanimous)	5	3:00	
Won the KORE MMA Bantamweight Muay Thai title.
13 March 2011	Win	(England) Claudia Celdar	Danger Zone	Cornwall, England	Points	5	2:00	
9 May 2010	Win	(England) Gemma Wilcox	Fast & Furious	Cornwall, England	Decision (Unanimous)	5	2:00	
Won the IKF English Featherweight title.
13 September 2009	Loss	(England) Alexis Rufus	Muay Thai Addicts II	London, England	Decision	5	2:00	
For the UKMF Women's English Featherweight title -57 kg.
26 July 2009	Win	(England) Claudia Celdar	Judgement Day 1	Cornwall, England	Points	5	2:00	
Won the ISKA Southern Area title 58.2kg.
September 2008	Loss	(Scotland) Amanda Kelly	Muay Thai event in England	(England)	Points	3	3:00	
2008	Win	(England) Sarah McCarthy	IMA England Eliminations	Cornwall, England	Decision (Unanimous)	5	2:00	
2008	Win	(England) Deborah Heatrick	Muay Thai event in England	Cambridge, England	Decision (Unanimous)	3	3:00	
Legend: Win Loss Draw/No contest Notes

== See also ==
- List of female kickboxers
