= 2019 in Glory =

Kickboxing events

Information
- First date: February 1, 2019
- Last date: December 21, 2019

Events
- Total events: 12

The year 2019 was the eighth year in the history of Glory, an international kickboxing promotion. The first event of the year, Glory 63: Houston, would also be the first to be broadcast on UFC Fight Pass as part of a new agreement with the UFC that saw their Fight Pass streaming service become the exclusive carrier of Glory events in the United States. Glory events were also broadcast through television agreements with Veronica TV, and other regional channels around the world.

== Glory 2019 Awards ==
The following fighters won the GLORY Kickboxing year-end awards for 2019:

- Glory Fighter of the Year 2019: Alex Pereira
- Glory Fight of the Year 2019: Antonio Plazibat vs. Tomas Mozny (Glory 69)
- Glory Knockout of the Year 2019: Ross Levine against Thomas Diagne (Glory 67)
- Glory Newcomer of the Year 2019: Antonio Plazibat
- Glory Highlight of the Year 2019: Rico Verhoeven vs. Badr Hari (Glory Collision 2)

== List of events ==
#	Event Title	Date	Arena	Location
1	Glory 63: Houston	February 1, 2019	Arena Theater	(United States) Houston, USA
2	Glory 64: Strasbourg	March 9, 2019	Rhénus Sport	Strasbourg, France
3	Glory 65: Utrecht	May 17, 2019	Central Studios	Utrecht, Netherlands
4	Glory 66:Paris	June 22, 2019	Zénith Paris	Paris, France
5	Glory 67: Orlando	July 5, 2019	Silver Spurs Arena	(United States) Orlando, USA
6	Glory 68: Miami	September 28, 2019	James L. Knight Center	(United States) Miami, USA
7	Glory 69: Düsseldorf	October 12, 2019	ISS Dome	Düsseldorf, Germany
8	Glory 70: Lyon	October 26, 2019	Palais des Sports de Gerland	Lyon, France
9	Glory 71: Chicago	November 22, 2019	Wintrust Arena	(United States) Chicago, USA
10	Glory 72: Chicago	November 23, 2019	Wintrust Arena	(United States) Chicago, USA
11	Glory 73: Shenzhen	December 7, 2019	Shenzhen Bay Sports Center	China
12	Glory: Collision 2	December 21, 2019	GelreDome	Arnhem, Netherlands

== Glory 63: Houston ==
Glory 63: Houston
- Promotion: Glory
- Date: February 1, 2019
- Venue: Arena Theater
- City: (United States) Houston, USA

Event chronology
Glory 62: Rotterdam	Glory 63: Houston

Glory 63: Houston was a kickboxing event held by Glory on February 1, 2019, at the Arena Theater in Houston, USA.

=== Background ===
This event featured a rematch between the champion Petchpanomrung Kiatmookao and top contender Serhiy Adamchuk for the Glory Featherweight Championship as the Glory 63: Houston headliner.

Glory heavyweight D’Angelo Marshall was unable to compete due to a visa issue that forced him from the fight card. Demoreo Dennis instead faced newcomer James Chapman.

=== Results ===
Glory 63
Weight Class				Method	Round	Time	Notes
Featherweight 65 kg	(Thailand) Petchpanomrung Kiatmookao (c)	def.	(Ukraine) Serhiy Adamchuk	Decision (Unanimous)	5	3:00	For the Glory Featherweight Championship
Welterweight 77 kg	(United States) Troy Jones	def.	(United States) Omari Boyd	Decision (Unanimous)	3	3:00	
Welterweight 77 kg	(United States) Richard Abraham	def.	(United States) Charles Rodriguez	Decision (Unanimous)	3	3:00	
Lightweight 70 kg	(China) Wensheng Zhang	def.	(South Africa) Lorawnt-t Nelson	Decision (Split)	3	3:00	
Featherweight 65 kg	(United States) Asa Ten Pow	def.	(United States) Nate Richardson	Decision (Unanimous)	3	3:00	
Superfight Series
Middleweight 85 kg	(Netherlands) Jason Wilnis	def.	(United States) Jacob Rodriguez	TKO (Leg Injury)	3	0:15	
Middleweight 85 kg	(United States) Matt Baker	def.	(United States) Ryot Waller	TKO (Referee Stoppage)	2	1:57	
Featherweight 65 kg	(England) Bailey Sugden	def.	(New Zealand) Quade Taranaki	Decision (Unanimous)	3	3:00	
Super Bantamweight 55 kg	(United States) Bekah Irwin	def.	(United States) Stephanie Skinner	Decision (Unanimous)	3	3:00	
Featherweight 65 kg	(Mexico) Abraham Vidales	def.	(United States) Dimitre Ivy	TKO (Retirement)	2	2:34	
Middleweight 85 kg	(United States) Joe Taylor	def.	(Chile) Ivan Galaz	Decision (Split)	3	3:00	
Prelims
Heavyweight 120 kg	(United States) Demoreo Dennis	def.	(United States) James Chapman	TKO (3 Knockdown Rule)	2	1:35	
Featherweight 65 kg	(United States) Kou Lee	def.	(Cambodia) Sovankesa Som	Decision (Unanimous)	3	3:00	
Lightweight 70 kg	(United States) Peter Stanonik	def.	(United States) Kemaan Diop	Decision (Split)	3	3:00	
Welterweight 77 kg	(United States) Sean Choice	def.	(United States) Justin Moss	Decision (Majority)	3	3:00	

== Glory 64: Strasbourg ==
Glory 64: Strasbourg
- Promotion: Glory
- Date: March 9, 2019
- Venue: Rhénus Sport
- City: Strasbourg, France

Glory 64: Strasbourg was a kickboxing event held by Glory on March 9, 2019, at the Rhénus Sport in Strasbourg, France.

=== Background ===
A Glory Welterweight Championship bout between current champion Harut Grigorian and former champion Cedric Doumbe served as the Glory 64: Strasbourg main event. The pairing were supposed to have met previously in October 2018 at Glory 60: Lyon, but Grigorian was unable to compete due to acute gastroenteritis.

In the co-featured slot, a Glory Women's Super Bantamweight Championship bout between current champion Anissa Meksen and former champion Tiffany van Soest took place. The pairing met previously at Glory 48: New York in December 2017 with Meksen capturing the title via unanimous decision.

Mohamed Abdallah was forced to withdraw from his main card bout with Daniel Škvor due to injuries sustained during training. D’Angelo Marshall stepped in on short notice to face Skvor.

Yassine Ahaggan had to withdraw from his match with Matej Penaz due to injuries sustained during training. Donovan Wisse takes his place against Penaz.

Esma Hasshass was scheduled to face Jiwaen Lee, but Hasshass was forced off the card for undisclosed reasons. Sarah Moussaddak served as the replacement.

William Goldie-Galloway was set to fight with Itay Gershon but had to withdraw the day of the fight for medical reasons. As a result, the fight was canceled.

=== Results ===
Glory 64
Weight Class				Method	Round	Time	Notes
Welterweight 77 kg	(France) Cedric Doumbe	def.	(Armenia) Harut Grigorian (c)	TKO (3 Knockdown Rule)	2	2:59	For the Glory Welterweight Championship
Super Bantamweight 55 kg	(France) Anissa Meksen (c)	def.	(United States) Tiffany van Soest	Decision (Split)	5	3:00	For the Glory Super Bantamweight Championship
Heavyweight 120 kg	(Curaçao) D'Angelo Marshall	def.	(Czech Republic) Daniel Škvor	KO (Punch)	3	1:43	
Light Heavyweight 95 kg	(Suriname) Donegi Abena	def.	(Netherlands) Michael Duut	Decision (Split)	3	3:00	
Superfight Series
Welterweight 77 kg	(Azerbaijan) Alim Nabiev	def.	(Suriname) Murthel Groenhart	Decision (Split)	3	3:00	
Light Heavyweight 95 kg	(France) Zinedine Hameur-Lain	def.	(Latvia) Artur Gorlov	DQ (Intentional Foul)	1	4:45	
Featherweight 65 kg	(Uzbekistan) Anvar Boynazarov	def.	(France) Abdellah Ezbiri	Decision (Unanimous)	3	3:00	
Welterweight 77 kg	(United States) Mike Lemaire	def.	(Germany) Arian Sadiković	Decision (Split)	3	3:00	
Middleweight 85 kg	(Suriname) Donovan Wisse	def.	(Czech Republic) Matěj Peňáz	TKO (Body Punch)	2	2:49	
Lightweight 70 kg	(Russia) Aleksei Ulianov	def.	(Netherlands) Massaro Glunder	Decision (Unanimous)	3	3:00	
Prelims
Lightweight 70 kg	(France) Michaël Palandre	def.	(France) Guerric Billet	Decision (Split)	3	3:00	
Middleweight 85 kg	(Turkey) Ertugrul Bayrak	def.	(Germany) Jakob Styben	Decision (Split)	3	3:00	
Super Bantamweight 55 kg	(France) Sarah Moussaddak	def.	(South Korea) Jiwaen Lee	Decision (Split)	3	3:00	
Welterweight 77 kg	(Germany) Dani Traoré	def.	(France) Jérémy Antonio	TKO (3 Knockdown Rule)	2	1:30	
Featherweight 65 kg	(Australia) River Daz	def.	(Germany) Vincent Foschiani	Decision (Split)	3	3:00	
Middleweight 85 kg	(France) Mathieu Ceva	def.	(France) Daniel Krost	Decision (Split)	3	3:00	

== Glory 65: Utrecht ==
Glory 65: Utrecht
- Promotion: Glory
- Date: May 17, 2019
- Venue: Central Studios
- City: Utrecht, Netherlands

Glory 65: Utrecht was a kickboxing event held by Glory on May 17, 2019, at the Central Studios in Utrecht, Netherlands.

=== Results ===
Glory 65
Weight Class				Method	Round	Time	Notes
Middleweight 85 kg	(Brazil) Alex Pereira (c)	def.	(Netherlands) Jason Wilnis	KO (Flying Knee)	1	1:31	For the Glory Middleweight Championship
Lightweight 70 kg	(Armenia) Marat Grigorian	def.	(Thailand) Sitthichai Sitsongpeenong (c)	Decision (Unanimous)	5	3:00	For the Glory Lightweight Championship
Middleweight 85 kg	(Suriname) Donovan Wisse	def.	(Tunisia) Yousri Belgaroui	Decision (Unanimous)	3	3:00	
Middleweight 85 kg	(Netherlands) Eyevan Danenberg	def.	(France) Yassine Ahaggan	KO (Knees to the Body)	1	1:53	
Superfight Series
Lightweight 70 kg	(Morocco) Tyjani Beztati	def.	(Canada) Josh Jauncey	Decision (Unanimous)	3	3:00	
Heavyweight 120 kg	(Turkey) Cihad Kepenek	def.	(Australia) Junior Tafa	Decision (Unanimous)	3	3:00	
Featherweight 65 kg	(Thailand) Thong Fairtex	def.	(England) Bailey Sugden	Decision (Split)	3	3:00	
Lightweight 70 kg	(England) Luke Whelan	def.	(Israel) Itay Gershon	Decision (Split)	3	3:00	
Super Bantamweight 55 kg	(Sweden) Sofia Olofsson	def.	(England) Christi Brereton	Decision (Split)	3	3:00	
Prelims
Middleweight 85 kg	(Netherlands) Kevin van Heeckeren	def.	(United States) Matt Baker	Decision (Unanimous)	3	3:00	
Welterweight 77 kg	(England) Ammari Diedrick	def.	(Germany) Dani Traoré	Decision (Split)	3	3:00	
Lightweight 70 kg	(Netherlands) Jos van Belzen	def.	(Belgium) Percy de Maeyer	TKO (3 Knockdown Rule)	1	2:08	

== Glory 66: Paris ==
Glory 66: Paris
- Promotion: Glory
- Date: June 22, 2019
- Venue: Zénith Paris
- City: Paris, France

Glory 66: Paris was a kickboxing event held by Glory on June 22, 2019, at the Zénith Paris in Paris, France.

=== Background ===
The bout between Luis Tavares and Stéphane Susperregui was expected for the GLORY 66 main card. On June 12, however, Susperregui pulled out of the bout due to the measles virus. Felipe Micheletti was pulled from a planned Superfight Series bout with Artur Gorlov and faced Tavares in the main card bout. Gorlov instead faced Yegish Yegoian.

Nordine Mahieddine was due to fight Tomas Mozny in the GLORY 66 Superfight Series, but the Slovak fighter withdrew due to an injury. Mahieddine instead faced the former K-1 Heavyweight Champion Antonio Plazibat, who stepped in on short notice for this encounter.

=== Results ===
Glory 66
Weight Class				Method	Round	Time	Notes
Welterweight 77 kg	(France) Cedric Doumbe (c)	def.	(Azerbaijan) Alim Nabiev	KO (Punches)	2	2:48	For the Glory Welterweight Championship
Super Bantamweight 55 kg	(France) Anissa Meksen (c)	def.	(Sweden) Sofia Olofsson	TKO (Doctor Stoppage)	1	2:06	For the Glory Super Bantamweight Championship
Welterweight 77 kg	(Morocco) Hamicha	def.	(England) Adam Hadfield	TKO (Punch to the Body)	1	1:35	
Light Heavyweight 95 kg	(Brazil) Felipe Micheletti	def.	(Netherlands) Luis Tavares	Decision (Split)	3	3:00	
Superfight Series
Light Heavyweight 95 kg	(Russia) Artem Vakhitov (c)	def.	(Suriname) Donegi Abena	Decision (Split)	5	3:00	For the Glory Light Heavyweight Championship
Light Heavyweight 95 kg	(Latvia) Artur Gorlov	def.	(Armenia) Jegish Yegoian	Decision (Unanimous)	3	3:00	
Lightweight 70 kg	(Bulgaria) Stoyan Koprivlenski	def.	(Morocco) Mohammed Jaraya	TKO (Doctor Stoppage)	3	2:13	
Heavyweight 120 kg	(Croatia) Antonio Plazibat	def.	(France) Nordine Mahieddine	Decision (Unanimous)	3	3:00	
Featherweight 65 kg	(Russia) Aleksei Ulianov	def.	(Japan) Masaya Kubo	Decision (Unanimous)	3	3:00	
Prelims
Lightweight 70 kg	(France) Michaël Palandre	def.	(Russia) Vlad Tuinov	Decision (Split)	3	3:00	
Middleweight 85 kg	(Czech Republic) Matěj Peňáz	def.	(France) Matthieu Ceva	TKO (3 Knockdown Rule)	1	1;46	
Lighteight 70 kg	(France) Guerric Billet	def.	(England) William Goldie-Galloway	Decision (Unanimous)	3	3:00	
Super Bantamweight 55 kg	(France) Sarah Moussaddak	def.	(France) Aurore Dos Santos	Decision (Unanimous)	3	3:00	

== Glory 67: Orlando ==
Glory 67: Orlando
- Promotion: Glory
- Date: July 5, 2019
- Venue: Silver Spurs Arena
- City: (United States) Orlando, USA

Glory 67: Orlando was a kickboxing event held by Glory on July 5, 2019, at the Silver Spurs Arena in Orlando, USA.

=== Background ===
Former super bantamweight champion Tiffany van Soest has been forced to withdraw from her scheduled GLORY 67 co-main event bout with Jady Menezes due to laser surgery after a slight detachment of the retina in one of her eyes. The bout will be rescheduled to a future Glory card.

=== Results ===
Glory 67
Weight Class				Method	Round	Time	Notes
Featherweight 65 kg	(Thailand) Petchpanomrung Kiatmookao (c)	def.	(Uzbekistan) Anvar Boynazarov	Decision (Unanimous)	5	3:00	For the Glory Featherweight Championship
Featherweight 65 kg	(United States) Asa Ten Pow	def.	(Morocco) Houssam El Kasri	Decision (Unanimous)	3	3:00	
Heavyweight 120 kg	(Netherlands) D'Angelo Marshall	def.	(Netherlands) Jahfarr Wilnis	Decision (Unanimous)	3	3:00	
Lightweight 70 kg	(United States) Elvis Gashi	def.	(United States) Justin Houghton	KO (Body Kick)	1	0:23	
Featherweight 65 kg	(Mexico) Abraham Vidales	def.	(United States) Trevor Ragin	Decision (Unanimous)	3	3:00	
Superfight Series
Featherweight 65 kg	(United States) Kevin VanNostrand	def.	(Ukraine) Serhiy Adamchuk	Decision (Unanimous)	3	3:00	
Super Bantamweight 55 kg	(United States) Bekah Irwin	def.	(United States) Taylor Jenkins	Decision (Unanimous)	3	3:00	
Lightweight 70 kg	(United States) Peter Stanonik	def.	(United States) Vince McGuinness	Decision (Unanimous)	3	3:00	
Welterweight 77 kg	(United States) Ross Levine	def.	(France) Thomas Diagne	KO (Head Kick)	1	0:43	
Lightweight 70 kg	(United States) Keemaan Diop	def.	(United States) John Morehouse	Decision (Unanimous)	3	3:00	
Prelims
Lightweight 70 kg	(United States) Nick Chasteen	def.	(United States) Javanis Ross	TKO (Leg Injury)	2	1:30	
Welterweight 77 kg	(United States) Taylor Krahl	def.	(United States) Paul Banasiak	Decision(Majority)	3	3:00	

== Glory 68: Miami ==
Glory 68: Miami
- Promotion: Glory
- Date: September 28, 2019
- Venue: James L. Knight Center
- City: (United States) Miami, USA

Glory 68: Miami was a kickboxing event held by Glory on September 28, 2019, at the James L. Knight Center in Miami, USA.

=== Background ===
Itay Gershon was scheduled to face Josh Jauncey at Glory 68, but the Israeli fighter suffered a broken rib in training and withdrew from the fight. Stepping in on a 3 weeks notice to replace Gerson was Lorawnt Nelson.

A Super Bantamweight bout between Bekah Irwin and Crystal Lawson was previously scheduled for the Glory 68 preliminary card. However, Irwin pulled out of the fight due injury she sustained in a car accident and the bout was scrapped.

=== Results ===
Glory 68
Weight Class				Method	Round	Time	Notes
Light Heavyweight 95 kg	(Brazil) Alex Pereira	def.	(Suriname) Donegi Abena	KO (Punch)	3	2:08	For the interim Glory Light Heavyweight Championship
Featherweight 65 kg	(United States) Asa Ten Pow	def.	(England) Bailey Sugden	Decision (Unanimous)	3	3:00	
Welterweight 77 kg	(United States) Troy Jones	def.	(England) Ammari Diedrick	TKO (3 Knockdown Rule)	1	2:28	
Welterweight 77 kg	(United States) Richard Abraham	def.	(United States) Mike Lemaire	Decision (Split)	3	3:00	
Lightweight 70 kg	(Canada) Josh Jauncey	def.	(United States) Lorawnt Nelson	Decision (Unanimous)	3	3:00	
Superfight Series
Super Bantamweight 55 kg	(United States) Tiffany van Soest	def.	(Brazil) Jady Menezes	Decision (Unanimous)	3	3:00	
Middleweight 85 kg	(United States) Matt Baker	def.	(Chile) Ivan Galaz	Decision (Unanimous)	4	3:00	
Featherweight 65 kg	(Mexico) Abraham Vidales	def.	(United States) Justin Greskiewicz	TKO (Max Knockdown Rule)	3	1:26	
Lightweight 70 kg	(United States) Omari Boyd	def.	(United States) Charles Rodriguez	Decision (Unanimous)	3	3:00	
Super Bantamweight 55 kg	(Brazil) Aline Pereira	def.	(Thailand) Chommanee Sor Taehiran	Decision (Unanimous)	3	3:00	
Prelims
Welterweight 77 kg	(United States) Nick Chasteen	def.	(United States) Keemaan Diop	Decision (Unanimous)	3	3:00	
Welterweight 77 kg	(United States) Ross Levine	def.	(United States) Sean Choice	Decision (Unanimous)	3	3:00	

== Glory 69: Düsseldorf ==
Glory 69: Düsseldorf
- Promotion: Glory
- Date: October 12, 2019
- Venue: ISS Dome
- City: Düsseldorf, Germany

Glory 69: Düsseldorf was a kickboxing event held by Glory on October 12, 2019, at the ISS Dome in Düsseldorf, Germany.

=== Results ===
Glory 69
Weight Class				Method	Round	Time	Notes
Lightweight 70 kg	(Armenia) Marat Grigorian (c)	def.	(Morocco) Tyjani Beztati	Decision (Unanimous)	5	3:00	For the Glory Lightweight Championship
Heavyweight 120 kg	(Germany) Michael Smolik	def.	(Germany) Mohamed Abdallah	Decision (Split)	3	3:00	
Light Heavyweight 95 kg	(Netherlands) Luis Tavares	def.	(Netherlands) Michael Duut	Decision (Unanimous)	3	3:00	
Middleweight 85 kg	(Tunisia) Yousri Belgaroui	def.	(Democratic Republic of the Congo) Ulrik Bokeme	Decision (Unanimous)	3	3:00	
Welterweight 77 kg	(Russia) Dmitry Menshikov	def.	(Switzerland) Yoann Kongolo	TKO (Doctor Stoppage)	2	2:59	
Superfight Series
Light Heavyweight 95 kg	(France) Stéphane Susperregui	def.	(Brazil) Felipe Micheletti	Decision (Unanimous)	4	3:00	
Heavyweight 120 kg	(Croatia) Antonio Plazibat	def.	(Slovakia) Tomáš Možný	Decision (Unanimous)	3	3:00	
Super Bantamweight 55 kg	(England) Christi Brereton	def.	(France) Sarah Moussaddak	Decision (Split)	3	3:00	
Light Heavyweight 95 kg	(Lithuania) Sergej Maslobojev	def.	(Azerbaijan) Bahram Rajabzadeh	Decision (Unanimous)	3	3:00	
Welterweight 77 kg	(Germany) Arian Sadiković	def.	(Germany) Dani Traoré	Decision (Unanimous)	3	3:00	
Prelims
Lightweight 70 kg	(Russia) Vlad Tuinov	def.	(Poland) Artur Saładiak	Decision (Unanimous)	3	3:00	
Lightweight 70 kg	(Netherlands) Massaro Glunder	def.	(Russia) Arbi Emiev	Decision (Unanimous)	3	3:00	
Featherweight 65 kg	(Australia) River Daz	def.	(Spain) Antonio Campoy	Decision (Unanimous)	3	3:00	
Middleweight 85 kg	(Germany) Jakob Styben	def.	(Netherlands) Kevin van Heeckeren	Decision (Split)	3	3:00	
Lightweight 70 kg	(Netherlands) Jos van Belzen	def.	(Australia) Matthew Stevens	Decision (Split)	3	3:00	

== Glory 70: Lyon ==
Glory 70: Lyon
- Promotion: Glory
- Date: October 26, 2019
- Venue: Palais des Sports de Gerland
- City: Lyon, France

Glory 70: Lyon was a kickboxing event held by Glory on October 26, 2019, at the Palais des Sports de Gerland in Lyon, France.

=== Background ===
Cedric Doumbe was out of his GLORY 70 title defence against Murthel Groenhart due to an elbow injury. Troy Jones stepped in on a week notice to face Groenhart for interim Glory Welterweight Title in the GLORY 70 main event.

=== Results ===
Glory 70
Weight Class				Method	Round	Time	Notes
Welterweight 77 kg	(Netherlands) Murthel Groenhart	def.	(United States) Troy Jones	KO (Punches)	2	2:38	For the interim Glory Welterweight Championship
Middleweight 85 kg	(Suriname) Donovan Wisse	def.	(Netherlands) Jason Wilnis	Decision (Unanimous)	3	3:00	
Featherweight 65 kg	(Morocco) Zakaria Zouggary	def.	(France) Abdellah Ezbiri	KO (Punches)	1	2:25	
Lightweight 70 kg	(Brazil) Bruno Gazani	def.	(France) Michael Palandre	Decision (Split)	3	3:00	
Superfight Series
Heavyweight 120 kg	(France) Nordine Mahieddine	def.	(Russia) Kirill Kornilov	Decision (Split)	3	3:00	
Middleweight 85 kg	(Czech Republic) Matěj Peňáz	def.	(France) Yassine Ahaggan	TKO (Retirement)	2	1:06	
Welterweight 77 kg	(United Kingdom) Jamie Bates	def.	(Turkey) Vedat Hoduk	Decision (Unanimous)	3	3:00	
Lightweight 70 kg	(Belgium) Mohamed Hendouf	def.	(France) Guerric Billet	Decision (Split)	3	3:00	
Featherweight 65 kg	(Thailand) Thong Fairtex	def.	(Japan) Masaya Kubo	Decision (Unanimous)	3	3:00	
Prelims
Welterweight 77 kg	(New Caledonia) Cédric Do	def.	(France) Mehdi Kada	TKO (3 Knockdown Rule)	2	1:04	
Super Bantamweight 55 kg	(France) Anaëlle Angerville	def.	(Portugal) Maria Lobo	Decision (Unanimous)	3	3:00	
Featherweight 65 kg	(France) Said Ahamada	def.	(France) Yoann Mermoux	Decision (Unanimous)	3	3:00	

== Glory 71: Chicago ==
Glory 71: Chicago
- Promotion: Glory
- Date: November 22, 2019
- Venue: Wintrust Arena
- City: (United States) Chicago, USA

Glory 71: Chicago was a kickboxing event held by Glory on November 22, 2019, at the Wintrust Arena in Chicago, USA.

=== Results ===
Glory 71
Weight Class				Method	Round	Time	Notes
Super Bantamweight 55 kg	(United States) Tiffany van Soest	def.	(France) Anissa Meksen (c)	Decision (Unanimous)	5	3:00	For the Glory Super Bantamweight Championship
Heavyweight 120 kg	(Romania) Benjamin Adegbuyi	def.	(Curaçao) D'Angelo Marshall	Decision (Unanimous)	3	3:00	
Welterweight 77 kg	(United States) Mike Lemaire	def.	(United States) Malik Watson-Smith	Decision (Unanimous)	3	3:00	
Welterweight 77 kg	(South Africa) Lowrant-T Nelson	def.	(England) Ammari Diedrick	Decision (Unanimous)	3	3:00	
Superfight Series
Heavyweight 120 kg	(Poland) Arkadiusz Wrzosek	def.	(United States) Demoreo Dennis	TKO (3 Knockdown Rule)	2	2:59	
Lightweight 70 kg	(United States) Nick Chasteen	def.	(United States) Seijo Imazaki	TKO (Retirement)	2	3:00	
Super Bantamweight 55 kg	(Brazil) Aline Pereira	def.	(United States) Crystal Lawson	TKO (3 Knockdown Rule)	1	0:59	
Middleweight 85 kg	(United States) Tom Jenkins	def.	(United States) Andrew Navickis	KO (Punches)	2	2:18	
Featherweight 65 kg	(Liberia) Arthur Sorsor	def.	(United States) Matt Zilch	Decision (Split)	3	3:00	
Prelims
Welterweight 77 kg	(United States) Justin Moss	def.	(United States) Kuchlong Kuchlong	Decision (Split)	3	3:00	

== Glory 72: Chicago ==
Glory 72: Chicago
- Promotion: Glory
- Date: November 23, 2019
- Venue: Wintrust Arena
- City: (United States) Chicago, USA

Glory 72: Chicago was a kickboxing event held by Glory on November 23, 2019, at the Wintrust Arena in Chicago, USA.

=== Background ===
The Glory Featherweight Championship bout between Petchpanomrung Kiatmookao and Aleksei Ulianov was expected for Glory 72: Chicago main event. However, on November 13, Ulianov pulled out of the bout due to visa issues. Kevin VanNostrand was pulled from the co-main event bout with Anvar Boynazarov and faced Kiatmookao in the main event for the Glory Featherweight Championship. His bout with Boynazarov was scrapped, as a result, the Jady Menezes vs. Chommanee Sor Taehiran bout was promoted to the main card.

=== Results ===
Glory 72
Weight Class				Method	Round	Time	Notes
Featherweight 65 kg	(Thailand) Petchpanomrung Kiatmookao (c)	-	(United States) Kevin VanNostrand	Draw (Majority)	5	3:00	For the Glory Featherweight Championship
Light Heavyweight 95 kg	(United States) Ryot Waller	def.	(United States) Chris Camozzi	Decision (Split)	4	3:00	
Super Bantamweight 55 kg	(Brazil) Jady Menezes	def.	(Thailand) Chommanee Sor Taehiran	KO (Body Punch)	3	1:57	
Featherweight 65 kg	(England) Bailey Sugden	def.	(United States) John Morehouse	TKO (Referee Stoppage)	1	2:12	
Superfight Series
Featherweight 65 kg	(Ukraine) Serhiy Adamchuk	def.	(Mexico) Abraham Vidales	TKO (Referee Stoppage)	3	1:27	
Welterweight 77 kg	(United States) Charles Rodriguez	def.	(United States) Taylor Krahl	TKO (Referee Stoppage)	1	2:59	
Featherweight 65 kg	(United States) Nathan Ward	def.	(United States) Justin Greskiewicz	Decision (Unanimous)	3	3:00	
Middleweight 85 kg	(United States) Joe Taylor	def.	(United States) Derek Loffer	KO (Punches)	2	2:09	
Heavyweight 120 kg	(United States) John King	def.	(United States) Tom Matlon	KO (Punches)	1	0:10	
Prelims
Featherweight 65 kg	(Kazakhstan) Kanat Tassybay	def.	(United States) Ben Acosta	Decision (Split)	3	3:00	

== Glory 73: Shenzhen ==
Glory 73: Shenzhen
- Promotion: Glory
- Date: December 7, 2019
- Venue: Shenzhen Bay Sports Center
- City: Shenzhen, China

Glory 73: Shenzhen was a kickboxing event held by Glory on December 7, 2019, at the Shenzhen Bay Sports Center in Shenzhen, China.

=== Results ===
Glory 73
Weight Class				Method	Round	Time	Notes
Lightweight 70 kg	(Armenia) Marat Grigorian (c)	def.	(United States) Elvis Gashi	KO (Punches)	5	2:03	For the Glory Lightweight Championship
Featherweight 65 kg	(Australia) River Daz	def.	(China) Meng Gaofeng	Decision (Split)	3	3:00	Featherweight Tournament Final
Lightweight 70 kg	(Canada) Josh Jauncey	def.	(Bulgaria) Stoyan Koprivlenski	Decision (Split)	3	3:00	
Featherweight 65 kg	(China) Meng Gaofeng	def.	(Japan) Masaya Kubo	Decision (Unanimous)	3	3:00	Featherweight Tournament Semi-Finals
Featherweight 65 kg	(Australia) River Daz	def.	(China) Hu Binqian	Decision (Unanimous)	3	3:00	Featherweight Tournament Semi-Finals
Superfight Series
Middleweight 85 kg	(China) Sun Chao	def.	(Kazakhstan) Farkhat Gassanov	TKO (Leg Kick)	3	0:46	
Catchweight 62 kg	(South Korea) Jin-hyeok Kim	def.	(China) Lu Dongqiang	TKO (Retirement)	1	3:00	
Heavyweight 120 kg	(Belarus) Andrey Gerasimchuk	-	(Brazil) Bruno Chaves	No Contest (Accidental Foul)	1	1:09	
Lightweight 70 kg	(Brazil) Bruno Gazani	def.	(Russia) Vlad Tuinov	TKO (Body kick)	3	0:23	
Featherweight 65 kg	(China) Chuanlin Zhao	def.	(Thailand) Thong Fairtex	TKO (2 Knockdown Rule)	2	2:22	Featherweight Tournament Reserve
Prelims
Welterweight 77 kg	(China) Jianhong Yu	def.	(China) Yunlong Dou	Decision (Unanimous)	3	3:00	
Super Bantamweight 55 kg	(United States) Selina Flores	def.	(China) Zhang Meng	Decision (Split)	3	3:00	

== Glory Collision 2 ==
Glory Collision 2
- Promotion: Glory
- Date: December 21, 2019
- Venue: GelreDome
- City: Arnhem, Netherlands
- Attendance: 31,000

Event chronology
Glory Collision 2	Glory 75: Utrecht

Glory Collision 2 (also known as Glory 74: Arnhem) was a kickboxing event held by Glory on December 21, 2019, at the GelreDome in Arnhem, Netherlands.

=== Background ===
It featured the highly anticipated rematch between GLORY Heavyweight champion, Rico Verhoeven, and Badr Hari. The event broke attendance record in the Netherlands.

=== Results ===
Glory Collision 2
Weight Class				Method	Round	Time	Notes
Heavyweight 120 kg	(Netherlands) Rico Verhoeven (c)	def.	(Morocco) Badr Hari	TKO (Leg Injury)	3	0:59	For the Glory Heavyweight Championship
Light Heavyweight 95 kg	(Netherlands) Luis Tavares	def.	(France) Stéphane Susperregui	Decision (Unanimous)	3	3:00	
Lightweight 70 kg	(Morocco) Mohammed Jaraya	def.	(Netherlands) Massaro Glunder	Decision (Unanimous)	3	3:00	
Featherweight 66 kg	(Morocco) Zakaria Zouggary	def.	(United States) Asa Ten Pow	Decision (Unanimous)	3	3:00	
Glory 74
Middleweight 85 kg	(Brazil) Alex Pereira (c)	def.	(Turkey) Ertugrul Bayrak	KO (Left hook)	1	3:00	For the Glory Middleweight Championship
Featherweight 65 kg	(Ukraine) Serhiy Adamchuk	def.	(Russia) Aleksei Ulianov	Decision (Split)	3	3:00	
Light Heavyweight 95 kg	(Brazil) Ariel Machado	def.	(Netherlands) Michael Duut	Decision (Unanimous)	3	3:00	
Lightweight 70 kg	(Israel) Itay Gershon	def.	(China) Li Zhaoyang	Decision (Majority)	3	3:00	
Superfight Series
Heavyweight 120 kg	(Croatia) Antonio Plazibat	def.	(Netherlands) Jahfarr Wilnis	Decision (Split)	3	3:00	
Middleweight 85 kg	(Suriname) Donovan Wisse	def.	(Brazil) César Almeida	Decision (Majority)	3	3:00	
Heavyweight 120 kg	(France) Nordine Mahieddine	def.	(Turkey) Cihad Kepenek	Decision (Split)	4	3:00	
Middleweight 85 kg	(Democratic Republic of the Congo) Ulrik Bokeme	def.	(Netherlands) Kevin van Heeckeren	Decision (Unanimous)	3	3:00	
Super Bantamweight 55 kg	(United States) Rebekah Irwin	def.	(China) Yi Xu	Decision (Split)	3	3:00	

== See also ==
- 2019 in Kunlun Fight
- 2019 in ONE Championship
- 2019 in Romanian kickboxing
