= Denise Kielholtz =

Dutch mixed martial arts (MMA) fighter

- Born: Denise Kielholtz; 30 March 1989 (age 37); Amsterdam, Netherlands
- Other names: Miss Dynamite
- Height: 1.60 m (5 ft 3 in)
- Weight: 58.06 kg (128.0 lb; 9.143 st)
- Division: Flyweight
- Style: Kickboxing, Judo
- Fighting out of: Almere-Buiten, Flevoland, Netherlands
- Team: Team Schreiber (MMA)
- Rank: Black Belt in Judo

Kickboxing record
- Total: 51
- Wins: 48
- Losses: 3

Mixed martial arts record
- Total: 15
- Wins: 9
- By knockout: 2
- By submission: 3
- By decision: 4
- Losses: 6
- By submission: 3
- By decision: 3

Other information
- Spouse: Hesdy Gerges
- Mixed martial arts record from Sherdog

Denise Kielholtz (born 30 March 1989) is a Dutch professional mixed martial artist and Muay Thai kickboxer, who competes in the women's Flyweight division of the Professional Fighters League (PFL). As of 21 April 2026, she is #6 in the PFL women's flyweight rankings.

== Mixed martial arts career ==
Kielholtz made her professional MMA debut at Torarica Summer Fights 1 in October 2015. She lost the fight via submission.

=== Bellator MMA ===
Kielholtz signed with Bellator in 2016, appearing in the promotion's inaugural kickboxing card, Bellator Kickboxing 1 in Turin, Italy on 16 April 2016. She would go 4–1 in kickboxing for the promotion, winning the Flyweight Championship along the way.

Kielholtz then made her Bellator MMA debut at Bellator 188 against Jessica Middleton. She won the fight via submission.

Kielholtz was expected to face Lena Ovchynnikova in the co-main event of Bellator 196 in Budapest, Hungary on 6 April 2018. However, Ovchynnikova pulled out of the fight and was replaced by Petra Částková. Kielholtz won the fight by unanimous decision.

Kielholtz faced Veta Arteaga on 21 September 2018, at Bellator 205. She lost the fight via a submission.

Kielholtz faced Bryony Tyrell at Bellator 223 on 22 June 2019. She won the fight via TKO in the third round.

Kielholtz faced Sabriye Şengül at Bellator London 2 on 23 November 2019. She won the fight via an Americana submission in the first round.

Kielholtz faced Kristina Williams at Bellator 239 on 21 February 2020. She won the fight via a rear-naked choke submission in the first round.

Kielholtz faced former Bellator Women's Flyweight title challenger Kate Jackson at Bellator 247 on 1 October 2020. She won the bout via knockout just 43 seconds into the first round. Subsequently, she signed a new contract with the Bellator MMA.

Kielholtz fought for the Bellator Women's Flyweight World Championship against champion Juliana Velasquez on 16 July 2021, at Bellator 262. She lost the bout in a razor thin split decision.

Kielholtz faced Kana Watanabe on 13 May 2022, at Bellator 281. She lost the fight via a triangle choke submission in the second round.

Kielholtz faced Ilara Joanne on 9 December 2022, at Bellator 289. She lost the fight via split decision.

Kielholtz faced Paula Cristina on 12 May 2023, at Bellator 296. She won the fight by unanimous decision.

Kielholtz faced Sumiko Inaba on 17 November 2023, at Bellator 301. In a bout contested mostly on the feet, Kielholtz maintained the advantage and won the bout via unanimous decision.

Kielholtz was scheduled to face Taila Santos on 4 April 2024, at PFL 1. However, a week before the event it was announced that Kielholtz had pulled out.

Kielholtz was scheduled to face Dakota Ditcheva at PFL Dubai: Nurmagomedov vs. Davis on 7 February 2026. However, Ditcheva withdrew due to injury and was replaced by Antonia Silvaneide. Kielholtz won the bout via unanimous decision.

The bout with Ditcheva was rescheduled and took place on 31 July 2026, at PFL New York. Kielholtz lost the bout via unanimous decision.

== Personal life ==
Kielholtz was born in Amsterdam to a Dutch father and a Curaçaoan mother. She is married to kickboxer Hesdy Gerges.

== Championships and awards ==
=== Kickboxing ===
- Bellator Kickboxing
  - Bellator Kickboxing Women's Flyweight Championship (One time, inaugural, final)
- Enfusion
  - 2014 Enfusion Live Champion 57 kg (1 Title Def.)
  - 2012 Enfusion -60 kg (Winner)
- World Muay Thai Association
  - 2013 WMTA Super Bantamweight World Champion
- World Full Contact Association
  - 2013 WFCA European Champion, -57 kg
- Slamm
  - 2011 Slamm Women's Championship -60 kg

=== Judo ===
- 2008 Dutch Team Championships (gold)
- 2006 Dutch Open Espoir U20 Tournament (bronze)
- 2005 Scottish Open U20 Championships Edinburgh (bronze)
- 2005 Scottish Open Championships Edinburgh (bronze)
- 2005 Dutch Championships U17
- 2004 Dutch Open Espoir U17 Tournament (bronze)
- 2003 Dutch Championships U15 Nieuwegein (gold)
- 2002 Dutch Championships U15 Nieuwegein (bronze)

=== Boxing ===
- 2012 Amateur Arabic Featherweight World Champion 55 kg (Defeated Lorena Klijn) -56 kg

== Mixed martial arts record ==
Professional record breakdown
15 matches	9 wins	6 losses
By knockout	2	0
By submission	3	3
By decision	4	3

Res.	Record	Opponent	Method	Event	Date	Round	Time	Location	Notes
Loss	9–6	Dakota Ditcheva	Decision (unanimous)	PFL New York: Nurmagomedov vs. Colgan	31 July 2026	3	5:00	Elmont, New York, United States	
Win	9–5	Antonia Silvaneide	Decision (unanimous)	PFL Dubai: Nurmagomedov vs. Davis	7 February 2026	3	5:00	Dubai, United Arab Emirates	Catchweight (127 lb) bout; Silvaneide missed weight.
Win	8–5	Sumiko Inaba	Decision (unanimous)	Bellator 301	17 November 2023	3	5:00	Chicago, Illinois, United States	
Win	7–5	Paula Cristina	Decision (unanimous)	Bellator 296	12 May 2023	3	5:00	Paris, France	
Loss	6–5	Ilara Joanne	Decision (split)	Bellator 289	9 December 2022	3	5:00	Uncasville, Connecticut, United States	
Loss	6–4	Kana Watanabe	Submission (triangle choke)	Bellator 281	13 May 2022	2	3:03	London, England	Kielholtz was deducted one point in round 2 due to illegal upkick.
Loss	6–3	Juliana Velasquez	Decision (split)	Bellator 262	16 July 2021	5	5:00	Uncasville, Connecticut, United States	For the Bellator Women's Flyweight World Championship.
Win	6–2	Kate Jackson	KO (punches)	Bellator 247	1 October 2020	1	0:43	Milan, Italy	
Win	5–2	Kristina Williams	Submission (rear-naked choke)	Bellator 239	21 February 2020	1	2:15	Thackerville, Oklahoma, United States	
Win	4–2	Sabriye Şengül	Submission (americana)	Bellator London 2	23 November 2019	1	0:32	London, England	
Win	3–2	Bryony Tyrell	TKO (punches)	Bellator 223	22 June 2019	3	2:48	London, England	
Loss	2–2	Veta Arteaga	Submission (guillotine choke)	Bellator 205	21 September 2018	2	4:24	Boise, Idaho, United States	
Win	2–1	Petra Částková	Decision (unanimous)	Bellator 196	6 April 2018	3	5:00	Budapest, Hungary	
Win	1–1	Jessica Middleton	Submission (scarfhold armbar)	Bellator 188	16 November 2017	1	1:16	Tel Aviv, Israel	
Loss	0–1	Juliete de Souza Silva	Submission (armbar)	Torarica Summer Fights 1	31 October 2015	1	N/A	Paramaribo, Suriname	Flyweight debut.

== Kickboxing record ==
Professional kickboxing record
Date	Result	Opponent	Event	Location	Method	Round	Time	Record
2022-10-29	Win	(Italy) Laura Pileri	HIT IT	Rotterdam, Netherlands	Decision (unanimous)	3	3:00	19–2
2017-04-08	Win	(Italy) Martine Michieletto	Bellator Kickboxing 5	Turin, Italy	Decision (unanimous)	5	3:00	18–2
Retains Bellator Kickboxing Women's Flyweight Championship.
2016-12-10	Win	(Italy) Gloria Peritore	Bellator Kickboxing 4	Florence, Italy	Decision (split)	5	3:00	17–2
Wins Bellator Kickboxing Women's Flyweight Championship.
2016-09-17	Win	(Hungary) Renata Lantos	Bellator Kickboxing 3	Budapest, Hungary	Decision (unanimous)	3	3:00	16–2
2016-06-24	Loss	(Italy) Gloria Peritore	Bellator Kickboxing 2	St. Louis, United States	Decision (split)	3	3:00	15–2
2016-04-16	Win	(Italy) Veronica Vernocchi	Bellator Kickboxing 1	Turin, Italy	Decision (split)	3	3:00	15–1
2014-11-23	Win	(United States) Tiffany van Soest	Enfusion Live 22	Groningen, Netherlands	Decision (unanimous)	5	3:00	14–1
Retains Enfusion Live Women's -57 kg/126 lb Championship.
2014-04-26	Win	(Slovakia) Lucia Krajčovič	Enfusion Live 17	Žilina, Slovakia	Decision (Unanimous)	3	3:00	13–1
2014-04-26	Win	(Netherlands) Ilona Wijmans	Enfusion Live 12	Alkmaar, Netherlands	Decision (Overturned)	5	3:00	12–1
Wins Enfusion Live World Title -57 kg.
2013-09-17	Win	(England) Vicky Church	Enfusion 4: Search for the SuperPro, Finals	Ko Samui, Thailand	Decision (Unanimous)	3	3:00	11–1
Wins Enfusion 4 Ladies Team Captains tournament title -61 kg.
2013-09-17	Win	(Lebanon) Manal Salman	Enfusion 4: Search for the SuperPro, Semi Finals	Ko Samui, Thailand	Decision (Unanimous)	3	3:00	10–1
2013-06-29	Win	(England) Christi Brereton	Enfusion Live 6	London, United Kingdom	Decision (Unanimous)	3	3:00	9–1
2013-04-13	Win	(Czech Republic) Alena Hola		Noordwijkerhout, Netherlands	Decision			8–1
Wins WMTA Super Bantamweight World title.
2013-02-18	Win	(Spain) Christina Morales		The Hague, Netherlands	Decision	5	2:00	7–1
Wins WFCA kickboxing European title -57 kg.
2012-12-02	Win	(England) Lucy Payne	Enfusion 3: Trial of the Gladiators, Final	Ljubljana, Slovenia	Decision	3	3:00	6–1
Wins Enfusion 3 Ladies Team Captains tournament title -57 kg.
2012-12-02	Win	(United States) Lindsay Scheer	Enfusion 3: Trial of the Gladiators, Semi Finals	Ljubljana, Slovenia	Decision	3	3:00	5–1
2012-05-27	Win	(Czech Republic) Kateřina Svobodová	Slamm 7: Holland vs Thailand		Decision	3	3:00	4–1
2011-12-28	Win		Slamm!! Soema Na Basi II	Paramaribo, Suriname	Decision (unanimous)		3:00	3–1
Wins Slamm Women’s Championship -60 kg.
2011-04-10	Win	(Italy) Sindy Huyer	Almere's Finest	Almere, Netherlands	Decision	3	3:00	2–1
2010-08-29	Win	(United States) Lindsay Scheer	Slamm Fighting with the Stars - B- Class	Suriname	Decision	3	3:00	1–1
2009-11-29	Loss	(United States) Lindsay Scheer	Slamm Holland vs. Thailand		Decision	3	3:00	0–1
Legend: Win Loss Draw/No contest Notes
