= Caley Reece =

Australian kickboxer (born 1979)

- Born: Caley Lewis; 23 November 1979 (age 46); Perth, Western Australia, Australia
- Other names: Cales
- Nationality: (Australia) Australian
- Height: 1.68 m (5 ft 6 in)
- Weight: 56.7 kg (125 lb; 8.93 st)
- Division: Featherweight; Lightweight
- Reach: 67.5 in (171 cm)
- Style: Muay Thai
- Stance: Orthodox
- Fighting out of: Perth, Western Australia, Australia
- Team: Riddlers Gym; Sinbi Muay Thai
- Trainer: Darren 'Daz' Reece; John Wayne Parr
- Rank: brown belt in Zen Do Kai
- Years active: 2005-2012; 2013-2015

Kickboxing record
- Total: 60
- Wins: 55
- By knockout: 3
- Losses: 5
- Draws: 0

Amateur record
- Total: 35
- Wins: 30
- Losses: 5
- Draws: 0

Other information
- Children: 2
- Last updated on: 15 March 2014

Caley Reece
Medal record

Representing Australia

Women's Muay Thai

World Combat Games
Silver medal – second place	Beijing 2010	-60 kg

Caley Reece (née Lewis; born 23 November 1979) is a retired Australian Muay Thai kickboxer who competed in the featherweight and lightweight divisions. A successful competitor at both amateur and professional levels, Reece came to prominence by winning state and national titles in her native Australia before going on to take six World Championships. Reece won a silver medal at the 2010 World Combat Games. She holds a notable victory over current Lion Fight Featherweight Champion and Glory Super Bantamweight Champion Tiffany van Soest.

== Early life ==
Caley Reece practiced Zen Do Kai for a number of years, achieving the rank of brown belt. Prior to her Muay Thai career, she was manager of a health clinic.

== Career ==
Reece had her first fight at the age of 25. Despite losing her first two fights, she would then embark on a lengthy winning streak and win the WMC Western Australia state and Australian national featherweight (-57.1 kg/126 lb) titles as well as the WKA Australian welterweight (-55 kg/122 lb) strap at amateur level. Turning professional in 2009, she captured the WPMF Women's World Featherweight (-57.1 kg/126 lb) Championship in her pro debut when she defeated Sindy Huyer via unanimous decision at Domination 3 in her home town of Perth on 5 September 2009. At the King's Birthday 2009 event in Bangkok, Thailand on 5 December 2009, she outpointed Jessica Sanchez to take the WMC Women's Intercontinental Featherweight Championship. She retained this belt with a unanimous decision victory over Jessica Gladstone at Supremacy 10: Talk is Cheap in Perth on 19 June 2010.

She returned to the amateur ranks to represent Australia in the women's -60 kg/132 lb Muay Thai division at the 2010 World Combat Games, which was held in Beijing, China between 28 August – 4 September 2010. A silver medalist, Reece defeated Alena Muratava by split decision in the quarter-finals and Aicha El Majydy by unanimous decision in the semis before losing a UD to Valentina Shevchenko in the final. Reece then also participated in the 2010 IFMA World Championships in Bangkok in December 2010 where she beat Kristina Alvarez on points in the quarter-finals prior to withdrawing from the competition.

Caley Reece was scheduled to fight Alla Ivashkevich for the vacant WMC Women's World Featherweight Championship at Epic 2: Honour in Perth on 19 March 2011. However, the Belarusian withdrew due to injury nine days before the fight and was replaced by Nong Tran Detract in a non-title match. Reece defeated the Thai by decision. She eventually got her chance to challenge for the belt at Epic 3: Believe on 25 June 2011 against Madeleine Vall, winning a decision to become the new champion.

Following this, Reece's next four fights came in Thailand where she recorded notable defeats of Ayadet Sor Sawaddee at the Queen's Cup 2011 in August 2011 and Magdalena Rak at the WMC Grand Prix on 3 April 2012. Later that month, she became the first woman to win two WMC titles in two different weight divisions when she beat Anna Willberg for the WMC Women's World Junior Lightweight (-58.9 kg/130 lb) Championship.

On 13 October 2012, Caley Reece made the first and only defence of her WMC featherweight title when she beat Meryem Uslu by unanimous decision at Epic 7: Staunch. She subsequently retired after the fight. Her retirement was brief, however, as eight months later, on 20 June 2013, she took a decision win over Patricia Silva at Epic 9: Hectic in her comeback fight.

Caley Reece became a four time world champion when she took the Lion Fight Women's Featherweight (-56.7 kg/125 lb) Championship from Tiffany van Soest in the Lion Fight 13 headliner on 7 February 2014 in Las Vegas, Nevada, United States. Although it was a close fight, Reece's use of the clinch and sweeps saw her take a split decision and hand van Soest her first professional defeat. She was then expected to face Sawsing Sor Sopit at Epic 10: Pressure in Perth on 15 March 2014 but Sawsing was replaced by Chommanee Taehiran. Reece defeated Chommanee by decision to retain her WMC world featherweight title. On 29 March 2015 she announced her retirement on her Facebook page.

== Personal life ==
She married her trainer Darren Reece in 2011.

== Championships and awards ==
=== Kickboxing ===
- AwakeningFighters.com
  - 2014 Personality of the Year
- International Kickboxer
  - 2012 Female Fighter of the Year
- Lion Fight
  - Lion Fight Women's Featherweight (-56.7 kg/125 lb) Championship (One time)
- Pimp Juice Cup
  - Pimp Juice Cup Tournament Championship
- World Combat Games
  - 2010 World Combat Games -60 kg/132 lb Muay Thai Silver Medalist (silver)
- World Kickboxing Association
  - WKA Amateur Women's Australian Welterweight (-55 kg/122 lb) Muay Thai Championship (One time)
- World Muaythai Council
  - WMC Amateur Women's Western Australia Featherweight (-57.1 kg/126 lb) Championship (One time)
  - WMC Amateur Women's Australian Featherweight (-57.1 kg/126 lb) Championship (One time)
  - WMC Women's Intercontinental Featherweight (-57.1 kg/126 lb) Championship (One time)
    - One successful title defence
  - WMC Women's World Featherweight (-57.1 kg/126 lb) Championship (One time)
    - Two successful title defences
  - WMC Women's World Junior Lightweight (-58.9 kg/130 lb) Championship (One time)
- World Professional Muaythai Federation
  - WPMF Women's World Featherweight (-57.1 kg/126 lb) Championship (One time)

== Kickboxing record ==
Professional kickboxing record
20 wins (3 KOs), 0 losses, 0 draws

Date	Result	Opponent	Event	Location	Method	Round	Time	
2014-03-15	Win	(Thailand) Chommanee Sor Taehiran	Epic 10: Pressure	Perth, Western Australia	Decision	5	2:00	20-0
Retains the WMC Women's World Featherweight (-57.1 kg/126 lb) Championship.
2014-02-07	Win	(United States) Tiffany van Soest	Lion Fight 13	Las Vegas, Nevada, USA	Decision (split)	5	3:00	19-0
Wins the Lion Fight Women's Featherweight (-56.7 kg/125 lb) Championship.
2013-06-20	Win	(Brazil) Patricia Silva	Epic 9: Hectic	Perth, Western Australia	Decision	5	2:00	18-0
2012-10-13	Win	(Germany) Meryem Uslu	Epic 7: Staunch	Perth, Western Australia	Decision (unanimous)	5	2:00	17-0
Retains the WMC Women's World Featherweight (-57.1 kg/126 lb) Championship.
2012-09-12	Win	(Thailand)	Sinbi vs. the Rest of Phuket	Phuket, Thailand	Decision	5		16-0
2012-06-30	Win	(Thailand) Pantiwa Boontanai	Epic 6	Perth, Western Australia	Decision	5	2:00	15-0
2012-04-00	Win	(Finland) Anna Willberg			Decision	5		14-0
Wins the WMC Women's World Junior Lightweight (-58.9 kg/130 lb) Championship.
2012-00-00	Win	(Thailand) Yodnampet		Thailand	TKO (left front kick)			13-0
2012-04-03	Win	(Poland) Magdalena Rak	WMC Grand Prix	Bangkok, Thailand	Decision	5	2:00	12-0
2012-00-00	Win	(Thailand) Yodnampet]			Decision	5	2:00	11-0
2011-08-00	Win	(Thailand) Ayadet Sor Sawaddee	Queen's Cup 2011	Bangkok, Thailand	Decision	5		10-0
2011-06-25	Win	(Sweden) Madeleine Vall	Epic 3: Believe	Perth, Western Australia	Decision	5	2:00	9-0
Wins the WMC Women's World Featherweight (-57.1 kg/126 lb) Championship.
2011-04-16	Win	(Australia) Sarah O'Connell	Domination 6	Perth, Western Australia	Decision (split)	5	2:00	8-0
2011-03-19	Win	(Thailand) Nong Tran Detract	Epic 2: Honour	Perth, Western Australia	Decision	5	2:00	7-0
2010-06-19	Win	(Canada) Jessica Gladstone	Supremacy 10: Talk is Cheap	Perth, Western Australia	Decision (unanimous)	5	2:00	6-0
Retains the WMC Women's Intercontinental Featherweight (-57.1 kg/126 lb) Championship.
2010-03-13	Win	(Australia) Tiana Caverley	Domination 4	Bentley, Australia	Decision	5	2:00	5-0
2010-02-20	Win	(Thailand) Kwanpirom Mnangroied	Supremacy 9: No Surrender	Perth, Western Australia	KO (left body kick)	1		4-0
2009-12-05	Win	(Spain) Jessica Sanchez	King's Birthday 2009	Bangkok, Thailand	Decision	5	2:00	3-0
Wins the WMC Women's Intercontinental Featherweight (-57.1 kg/126 lb) Championship.
2009-10-17	Win	(Thailand) Sararat Kongsawang	Supremacy 8	Perth, Western Australia	TKO (knees)	3		2-0
2009-09-05	Win	(Italy) Sindy Huyer	Domination 3	Perth, Western Australia	Decision (unanimous)	5	2:00	1-0
Wins the WPMF Women's World Featherweight (-57.1 kg/126 lb) Championship.

Amateur kickboxing record
30 wins (? KOs), 5 losses, 0 draws

Date	Result	Opponent	Event	Location	Method	Round	Time
2010-12-01	Win	(United States) Kristina Alvarez	2010 IFMA World Championships -60 kg/132 lb, Quarter Finals	Bangkok, Thailand	Decision	4	2:00
2010-00-00	Loss	(Peru) Valentina Shevchenko	2010 World Combat Games -60 kg/132 lb Muay Thai, Final	Beijing, China	Decision (unanimous)	4	2:00
Wins the 2010 World Combat Games -60 kg/132 lb Muay Thai Silver Medal.
2010-00-00	Win	(Morocco) Aicha El Majydy	2010 World Combat Games -60 kg/132 lb Muay Thai, Semi Finals	Beijing, China	Decision (unanimous)	4	2:00
2010-00-00	Win	(Belarus) Alena Muratava	2010 World Combat Games -60 kg/132 lb Muay Thai, Quarter Finals	Beijing, China	Decision (split)	4	2:00
2009-05-08	Loss	(Australia) Nicole Brolan	Powerplay Promotions 10: Pay Back Time	Melbourne, Australia	Decision	5	2:00
2009-04-04	Win	(Australia) Nicole Brolan	Pimp Juice Cup, Final	Sydney, Australia	Decision (unanimous)	4	2:00
Wins the Pimp Juice Cup Tournament Championship.
2009-04-04	Win	(New Zealand) Bronwyn Wylie	Pimp Juice Cup, Semi Finals	Sydney, Australia	Decision (unanimous)	3	2:00
2009-03-14	Win	(Australia) Theresa Carter	Supremacy 6: The Real Deal	Perth, Western Australia	Decision (unanimous)	5	3:00
2008-10-18	Win	(Australia) Alicia Pestana	Supremacy 5: Unbreakable	Perth, Western Australia	Decision (unanimous)	5	2:00
2008-06-28	Win	(New Zealand) Angela Bennett	Supremacy 4: All or Nothing	Perth, Western Australia	Decision (unanimous)	5	2:00
2007-10-06	Win	(New Zealand) Carmen Thompson	Supremacy 2	Perth, Western Australia	Decision (unanimous)	5	2:00
2007-06-09	Win	(Thailand) Nitikwan	Supremacy 1	Perth, Western Australia	Decision (unanimous)	5	2:00
2006-12-00	Win	(Australia) Kate Hueston		Australia	Decision (unanimous)	5	2:00
Wins the WMC Amateur Women's Western Australia Featherweight (-57.1 kg/126 lb) Championship.

Legend: Win Loss Draw/No contest Notes

== See also ==
- List of female kickboxers
