= Teresa Wintermyr =

- Born: Stockholm, Sweden
- Nationality: Swedish
- Height: 1.71 m (5 ft 7 in)
- Weight: 54 kg (119 lb)
- Division: Bantamweight
- Style: Muay Thai
- Fighting out of: Phuket, Thailand
- Team: AKA Thailand; Sinbi Muay Thai
- Last updated on: May 6, 2013

Teresa Wintermyr is a Swedish female kickboxer and former model, based in Phuket, Thailand. She competes professionally since 2007 and is the current WMC Muay Thai World Bantamweight champion.

== Titles ==
- 2012 WMC World Bantamweight Championship (1 title defense)

== Muay Thai & Kickboxing record ==
Muay Thai & Kickboxing record (incomplete)
39 wins (17 KO's), 28 losses, draw
Date	Result	Opponent	Event	Location	Method	Round	Time	Record
2016-08-12	Loss	(Thailand) Doagmaiparr		Bangkok, Thailand	Decision	5	2:00	
2016-04-16	Loss	(Thailand) Namtarn Por. Muangphet		Yasothon, Thailand	Decision	3	3:00	
2016-03-11	Win	(Thailand) Nung Ning		Phuket, Thailand	TKO			
2015-08-05	Loss	(Thailand) Saifah Sor Suparat		Chiang Mai, Thailand	Decision	5	3:00	
For WBC Muay Thai World Bantamweight title.
2015-02-21	Loss	(Russia) Tanya	Sinbi Fight Night	Bangkok, Thailand	TKO	4		
2014-12-16	Win	(Thailand) Chommanee Sor Taehiran	Sinbi Fight Night	Phuket, Thailand	Decision	5	2:00	
2014-11-29	Win	(Thailand) Saifah Sor Suparat	Sinbi Fight Night	Phuket, Thailand	Decision	5	2:00	
2014-10-27	Loss	(Thailand) Saifah Sor Suparat	Angel Fight Extreme	Bangkok, Thailand	Decision	5	2:00	
2014-07-31	Loss	(Thailand) Hongthong Liangbrasert		Phuket, Thailand	Decision			
2014-06-18	Win	(Thailand) Moddaeng Cherngtalay		Phuket, Thailand	Decision			
2014-06-08	Win	(Thailand)		Phuket, Thailand	Decision	5	2:00	
2014-04-13	Win	(Thailand) Duennapa Mor. Ratana Bundit	World Muaythai Angels 16, Third Place Match	Bangkok, Thailand	KO (Knees)	1		
Wins World Muaythai Angels bronze medal.
2014-04-13	Loss	(Thailand) Chommanee Sor Taehiran	World Muaythai Angels 16, Semi Finals	Bangkok, Thailand	Decision	3	2:00	
2014-01-17	Win	(Thailand) Snooker Suhaigym	Muay Thai Warriors	Phuket, Thailand	Decision	5	2:00	
2013-11-07	Win	(Romania) Ilinca Lucia Serbu	World Muaythai Angels 16, Quarter Finals	Bangkok, Thailand	Decision	3	2:00	
2013-10-02	Win	(Spain) Jessica Sanchez	World Muaythai Angels 16, First Round	Bangkok, Thailand	Decision	3	2:00	
2013-08	Win	(Thailand) Petchdara		Phuket, Thailand	KO (Knee)	4		
Retains WMC World Bantamweight title.
2013-06-21	Win	(Thailand) Buagaew Giatsombat		Phuket, Thailand	Decision	3	3:00	
2013-05-24	Win	(Thailand) Nong Breeze Sit Dtaibat	Top King Muay Thai	Phuket, Thailand	Decision	3	3:00	
2013-04-27	Loss	(France) Laurene Pumpanmuang		Ko Samui, Thailand	Points	4	2:00	
2012-11-30	Win	(Finland) Sonal Pattni		Phuket, Thailand	Decision	5	3:00	
Wins WMC World Bantamweight title.
2012-10	Win	(Thailand)	Top King Muay Thai	Phuket, Thailand	TKO	2		
2012-08-11	Loss	(Thailand) Kwanjai Pabaijaturat	Queen's Cup	Phuket, Thailand	Decision	5	3:00	
Fight was for the WMC World Flyweight title.
2012-07-18	Loss	(Germany) Farida Okiko		Phuket, Thailand	Decision	3	3:00	
2012-05-13	Win	(Thailand) Oronong Bor Petpaiboon		Phuket, Thailand	TKO			
2012-04-28	Win	(Thailand) Jenjira Giatpetchmonkol		Phuket, Thailand	Decision	3	3:00	
2012-03-20	Win	(Thailand) Nong Breeze Sit Dtaibat	Top King Muay Thai	Ranong, Thailand	Decision	3	3:00	
2012-01-	Win	(Thailand)		Phuket, Thailand	TKO (Punches)	3		
2011-12-03	Win	(Finland) Sonal Pattni	Sinbi Muay Thai Event	Phuket, Thailand	Decision	3	3:00	
2011-12	Win	(Thailand)		Phuket, Thailand	KO	2		
2011-11	Win	(Thailand) Menang Oleh		Bangkok, Thailand	TKO (Knee to the body)	1		
2011-08-29	Loss	(England) Iman Barlow		Phuket, Thailand	Decision	5	2:00	
2011-08-11	Win	(Denmark) Tuyet Trinh Thi Vu	Queen’s Cup	Bangkok, Thailand	Decision			
2011-07-09	Loss	(Thailand) Saifa		Bali, Indonesia	Decision	5	3:00	
For the WPMF Bantamweight title.
2011-06-13	Win	(Thailand) Top King Muay Thai		Phuket, Thailand	TKO (Knee to the body and punch)	1		
2010-10-16	Loss	(Australia) Serin Murray	Real Deal Muay Thai Kickboxing & MMA	Australia	TKO			
2010-10-06	Win	(Thailand) Petnari		Phuket, Thailand	TKO (Punches)	3		
2010-09-03	Win	(Thailand) Hathai		Phuket, Thailand	TKO (Knee)	4		
2010-08-30	Win	(Thailand)		Bangkok, Thailand	Decision	3	3:00	
2010-03-25	Win	(Thailand)		Phuket, Thailand	Decision	3	3:00	
2009-10-07	Loss	(Taiwan) Joey Lee	Planet Battle VII	Wan Chai, Hong Kong	TKO			
Fight was for the WMC Intercontinental Featherweight title.
Legend: Win Loss Draw/No contest Notes

== See also ==
- List of female kickboxers
