= Christi Brereton =

English martial artist

- Born: Christi Coral Campbell; 26 November 1992 (age 33); Exeter, England
- Nickname: Blonde Boom
- Nationality: English
- Height: 5 ft 6 in (1.68 m)
- Weight: 125 lb (57 kg; 8 st 13 lb)
- Division: Super Bantamweight
- Reach: 66 in (168 cm)
- Style: Muay Thai
- Fighting out of: Exeter, England
- Team: Chaos Muay Thai Fitness and Competition Training Centre
- Trainer: Steve Pender
- Years active: 2012-present

Kickboxing record
- Total: 28
- Wins: 21
- By knockout: 5
- Losses: 6
- Draws: 1

Other information
- Spouse: Steve Pender

Christi Coral Brereton (née Campbell; born 26 November 1992) is an English female kickboxer and muay thai fighter based in Okehampton. She has fought for a WBC Muaythai title. Christi Brereton is signed with kickboxing organisation Glory

She is the former WPMF, WBC Muaythai British Champion and Roar Combat League World Champion at super bantamweight.

WBC Muaythai ranks her as the #2 Super Bantamweight in the world, as of April 2020.

== Personal life ==
Christi Brereton is a coach at Chaos Muay Thai Fitness and Competition Training Centre and is the co-owner of it, together with her trainer and partner Stephen Pender. The two of them are parents of a daughter. She is a qualified Fitness Gym Instructor.

== Kickboxing career ==
Brereton made her professional debut against Kim Shannon, at 14 years of age. The fight ended in a draw.

In 2005, at the age of 15, Brereton faced Outi Louhimo for the WPMF Muaythai World title. She won a unanimous decision.

In 2013, she defeated Grace Spicer and Alexis Rufus to win the WBC Muaythai British and UKMF Women's British titles.

In 2016 she defeated Marina Zarogianni to win the Roar Combat League Super Bantamweight title. She defended it three times, with unanimous decision wins over Josefine Lindgren Knutsson and Anaëlle Angerville, as well as a TKO win over Soraya Bucherie.

In 2019 she signed with Glory Kickboxing. She won a unanimous decision against Nicola Kaye in her first fight with the organization. In her second fight she lost a split decision against Sofia Olofsson. In her third fight she won a split decision over Sarah Moussaddak.

== Championships and accomplishments ==
- World Boxing Council Muaythai
  - WBC Muaythai British Title
    - One successful title defense
- World Professional Muaythai Federation
  - WPMF Muay Thai World Super Bantamweight Championship
- World Ring Sports Association
  - WRSA Muay Thai World Super Bantamweight Championship
- Roar Combat League
  - RCL Super Bantamweight World Championship
    - Three title defenses

== Kickboxing record ==
Kickboxing record
21 wins (5 KOs), 6 losses, 1 draw
Date	Result	Opponent	Event	Location	Method	Round	Time	Record
2019-10-12	Win	(France) Sarah Moussaddak	Glory 69: Düsseldorf	Düsseldorf, Germany	Decision (Split)	3	3:00	21–6–1
2019-05-17	Loss	(Sweden) Sofia Olofsson	Glory 65: Utrecht	Utrecht, Netherlands	Decision (Split)	3	3:00	20–6–1
2018-11-23	Win	(France) Anaëlle Angerville	Roar Combat League 10	Watford, England	Decision (Unanimous)	5	3:00	20–5–1
Defends the RCL Super Bantamweight title.
2018-06-02	Win	(England) Nicola Kaye	Glory 54: Birmingham	Birmingham, England	Decision (Unanimous)	3	3:00	19–5–1
2017-10-14	Win	(France) Soraya Bucherie	Roar Combat League 7	Watford, England	TKO (Punches and kicks)	1	0:23	18–5–1
Defends the RCL Super Bantamweight title.
2017-04-01	Win	(China) Huang Li	Wu Lin Feng 2017: China VS Europe	Henan, China	Decision (Unanimous)	3	3:00	17–5–1
2016-10-22	Win	(Sweden) Josefine Lindgren Knutsson	Roar Combat League 4	Watford, England	Decision (Unanimous)	5	3:00	16–5–1
Defends the RCL Super Bantamweight title.
2016-05-28	Win	(Greece) Marina Zarogianni	Roar Combat League 1	Watford, England	TKO	4		15–5–1
Wins the RCL Super Bantamweight title.
2015-02-?	Win	(Spain) Alexandra Timar	Super MTC	Watford, England	Decision (Unanimous)	1	1:54	14–5–1
2014-11-30	Win	(Scotland) Helen Wilson	Muay Thai Unleashed 4	Wellington, England	TKO (Cuts)	4	3:00	13–5–1
Defends the WBC Muaythai British title.
2014-10-19	Win	(France) Soraya Bucherie	Super MTC	London, England	Decision (Unanimous)	5	3:00	12–5–1
2014-07-09	Loss	(Netherlands) Jemyma Betrian	WCK Muay Thai: International Showdonw	Temecula, California, United States	TKO	2	3:00	11–5–1
For the WBC Muaythai World Bantamweight title.
2014-02-22	Win	(England) Alexis Rufus	Muay Thai Unleashed II	Telford, England	Decision (Unanimous)	5	2:00	11–4–1
Wins the UKMF Women's British Bantamweight Title.
2013-11-02	Win	(England) Grace Spicer	WBC National Title	London, England	Decision (Unanimous)	5	2:00	9–4–1
Wins the WBC Muaythai British Title.
2013-07-27	Win	(Scotland) Amy Pirnie	PSP European title	Devon, England	Decision (Unanimous)	5	2:00	8–4–1
2013-06-29	Loss	(Netherlands) Denise Kielholtz	Enfusion Live 6	London, England	Decision (Unanimous)	3	3:00	7–4–1
2010-04-12	Win	(England) Carla Sullivan	?	London, England	Decision (Unanimous)	5	2:00	7–3–1
2009	Loss	(Scotland) Amanda Kelly	?	?	Decision (Unanimous)	5	3:00	6–3–1
2008	Win	(England) Jackie Short	?	Birmingham, England	Decision (Unanimous)	5	2:00	6–2–1
14 Sep 2008	Loss	(Scotland) Joanne Calderwood	?	Glasgow, Scotland	Decision (Unanimous)	5	2:00	5–2–1
2008-05-27	Loss	(England) Ruth Ashdown	?	London, England	Decision (Unanimous)	2	3:00	5–1–1
2007-04-12	Win	(Finland) Outi Louhimo	WPMF World title	?	Decision (Unanimous)	5	2:00	5–0–1
Wins the WPMF Muaythai World Title.
?	Win	(England) Cara Nodwell	?	London, England	Decision (Unanimous)	5	2:00	4–0–1
?	Win	(United Kingdom) Debbie McCulloch	?	Manchester, England	Decision (Unanimous)	5	2:00	3–0–1
?	Win	(England) Sophie Bowyer	?	?	Decision (Unanimous)	5	2:00	2–0–1
?	Win	(England) Natasha Gold	?	Southampton, England	Decision (Unanimous)	5	2:00	1–0–1
?	Draw	(England) Kim Shannon	?	Birmingham, England	Decision (Unanimous)	5	2:00	0–0–1
Legend: Win Loss Draw/No contest Notes

== See also ==
List of female kickboxers
