= Sarah Moussaddak =

French-Moroccan kickboxer and mixed martial artist (born 2000)

- Born: April 14, 2000 (age 26); Valenciennes, Nord, France
- Height: 163 cm (5 ft 4 in)
- Weight: 55 kg (121 lb; 8.7 st)
- Style: Kickboxing
- Stance: Orthodox
- Fighting out of: Brussels, Belgium
- Team: Team Halouane; Queensbury Gym (2020–2023); Valon Basha Gym (2024-present)
- Years active: 2019–present

Kickboxing record
- Total: 14
- Wins: 10
- By knockout: 1
- Losses: 4
- By knockout: 1

Mixed martial arts record
- Total: 1
- Wins: 1
- By knockout: 1
- Losses: 0

Sarah Moussaddak (born April 14, 2000) is a French-Moroccan kickboxer and mixed martial artist.

== Kickboxing career ==
Moussadak made her WFL promotional debut against Samantha Van Doorn at World Fighting League on February 17, 2019. She won the fight by unanimous decision. This victory earned Moussadak a contract with Glory, as she faced Jiwaen Lee at Glory 64: Strasbourg on March 9, 2019, as a late-notice replacement for Esma Hasshass. She won her Glory debut by split decision. Moussadak next faced Aurore Dos Santos at Glory 66: Paris on June 22, 2019. She won the fight by unanimous decision.

Moussadak Christi Brereton at Glory 69: Düsseldorf on October 12, 2019, in her third Glory appearance. She lost the fight by split decision. Moussadak next fought outside of Glory, as she faced Emma Gongora at Nuit Des Champions on November 16, 2019. She once again lost the fight by split decision.

Moussadak returned from a near two-year absence from the sport to face Ella Grapperhouse for the ISKA European -57 kg title, at the October 16, 2021 Fighting Edition event. She captured her first professional title by decision. After capturing the European ISKA title, Moussadak was booked to challenge Anta Marina Sanchez for the WAKO World -56 kg Championship at the May 14, 2022 Fighting Edition event. She won the five-round bout by decision.

Moussadak challenged Tiffany van Soest for the Glory Women's Super Bantamweight Championship at Glory: Collision 4 on October 8, 2022. She lost the fight by a narrow unanimous decision.

Moussadak was expected to face Giuliana Cosnard at Glory Rivals 5 on January 28, 2023. She later withdrew with an injury and was replaced by Tessa de Kom. Moussadak was expected to face Joana Kiptiu at Fight Night One on April 29, 2023. Moussadak was rescheduled to face Guiliana Cosnard at Glory 86 on May 27, 2023, as her fight with Kiptiu likewise fell through for undisclosed reasons. Moussaddak won the fight by unanimous decision.

Moussadak challenged the Glory Women's Super Bantamweight champion Tiffany van Soest for the second time at Glory 88 on September 9, 2023. She lost the fight by a second-round knockout.

== Championships and accomplishments ==
- International Sport Karate Association
  - 2021 ISKA European -57 kg Championship
- World Association of Kickboxing Organizations
  - 2022 WAKO-Pro K-1 World -56 kg Championship
- La Nuit des Titans
  - 2025 La Nuit des Titans K-1 -56 kg Champion

== Mixed martial arts record ==
Professional record breakdown
1 match	1 win	0 losses
By knockout	1	0
By submission	0	0
By decision	0	0

Res.	Record	Opponent	Method	Event	Date	Round	Time	Location	Notes
Win	1–0	Maria Hingu	KO (punches)	Ares FC 40	10 April 2026	1	0:30	Paris, France	Strawweight debut.

== Kickboxing record ==
Professional Kickboxing Record
10 Wins (2 (T)KO's), 4 Losses, 0 Draw, 0 No Contest
Date	Result	Opponent	Event	Location	Method	Round	Time
2025-02-22	Win	(Netherlands) Nina van Dalum	La Nuit des Titans	Tours, France	Decision	3	3:00
Wins the vacant La Nuit des Titans K-1 -56kg title.
2024-09-21	Win	(Italy) Ester Viola	Fight 4 Respect	Brussels, Belgium	TKO (Ref. stop/punches)		
2023-09-09	Loss	(United States) Tiffany van Soest	Glory 88	Paris, France	KO (High kick)	2	1:47
For the Glory Women's Super Bantamweight Championship.
2023-05-27	Win	(Argentina) Giuliana Cosnard	Glory 86	Essen, Germany	Decision (Unanimous)	3	3:00
2022-10-08	Loss	(United States) Tiffany van Soest	Glory: Collision 4	Arnhem, Netherlands	Decision (Unanimous)	5	3:00
For the Glory Women's Super Bantamweight Championship.
2022-05-14	Win	(Spain) Anta Maria Sanchez	Fighting Edition 4	Orchies, France	Decision (Unanimous)	5	3:00
Won the vacant WAKO Pro K-1 World -56 kg Championship.
2021-10-16	Win	(Netherlands) Ella Maria Grapperhaus	Fighting Edition 3	Valenciennes, France	Decision	5	3:00
Won the ISKA European -57 kg Championship.
2019-11-16	Loss	(France) Emma Gongora	Nuit Des Champions	Marseille, France	Decision (Split)	3	3:00
2019-10-12	Loss	(United Kingdom) Christi Brereton	Glory 69: Düsseldorf	Düsseldorf, Germany	Decision (Split)	3	3:00
2019-06-22	Win	(France) Aurore Dos Santos	Glory 66: Paris	Paris, France	Decision (Unanimous)	3	3:00
2019-03-09	Win	(South Korea) Jiwaen Lee	Glory 64: Strasbourg	Strasbourg, France	Decision (Split)	3	3:00
2019-02-17	Win	(Netherlands) Samantha Van Doorn	World Fighting League	Almere, Netherlands	Decision	3	3:00
2018-12-15	Win	(Vietnam) Kim Thuy Van Nguyen	The Fighters 5	Hérin, France	Decision	3	3:00
2018-10-06	Win	(Belgium) Soumeya Sammoudi	Challenge	Saint-Amand-les-Eaux , France	TKO (Referee stoppage)	2	
Legend: Win Loss Draw/No contest Notes

Amateur Kickboxing Record
Date	Result	Opponent	Event	Location	Method	Round	Time
2017-04-30	Win	(France) Jessica Feron	Fight & Dance 5	Berchem-Sainte-Agathe, France	TKO (Corner stoppage)	2	
2017-02-19	Draw	(France) Inès Pilutti	Interclub du Napoli Gym	Evere, Belgium	Decision	3	2:00
2016-03-13	Loss	(Netherlands) Giorgina Van Der Linden	l'Emperor Chok Dee	Vandœuvre-lès-Nancy, France	Decision	3	1:30
2016-01-30	Loss	(France) Chloé Riscala	Go Fight 2	Marly-le-Roi, France	Decision (Majority)	3	2:00
Legend: Win Loss Draw/No contest Notes

== See also ==
- List of female kickboxers
