= Chommanee Sor Taehiran =

Thai kickboxer

- Born: January 14, 1994 (age 32); Thailand
- Height: 166 cm (5 ft 5 1/2 in)
- Weight: 58 kg (128 lb; 9 st 2 lb)
- Division: Flyweight (MMA); Featherweight (kickboxing)
- Reach: 70 in (180 cm)
- Style: Muay Thai

Kickboxing record
- Total: 114
- Wins: 94
- By knockout: 15
- Losses: 19
- Draws: 1

Mixed martial arts record
- Total: 1
- Wins: 0
- Losses: 1
- By submission: 1

Other information
- Mixed martial arts record from Sherdog

Chommanee Sor Taehiran (born January 14, 1994) is a Thai female Muay Thai kickboxer and mixed martial artist who competes in the featherweight division in kickboxing and the flyweight division in MMA.

== Kickboxing career ==
She has competed professionally since 2013 and has competed for the World Muaythai Council title against Caley Reece. In 2015 Chommanee Sor Taehiran won the first World Muay Thai Angels tournament. During 2015 she also won the Kings Cup Tournament. In 2018 she signed a multi-fight deal with Glory Kickboxing.

== Championships and accomplishments ==
=== Muay Thai ===
- World Muaythai Council
  - WMC Women's World Featherweight (-57.1 kg/126 lb) Championship (one time)
- Regional Tournaments
  - 2014 King Cup Tournament Winner (-57 kg/125.6 lb)
  - 2014 World Muay Thai Angels Tournament Champion (-57 kg/125.6 lb)
  - 2017 World Muay Thai Angels Tournament Runner-up (-57 kg/125.6 lb)

== Fight record ==
Kickboxing & Muay Thai record (incomplete)
94 Wins (15 KOs), 19 Losses, 1 Draw
Date	Result	Opponent	Event	Location	Method	Round	Time	Record
2020-12-13	Win	(Scotland) Erin Kowal	8 Super Champ	Bangkok, Thailand	Decision	3	3:00	
2020-11-15	Win	(Scotland) Claire Rankine	8 Super Champ	Bangkok, Thailand	Decision	3	3:00	
2019-11-23	Loss	(Brazil) Jady Menezes	Glory 72: Chicago	Chicago, Illinois	TKO (body punch)	3	1:57	
2019-09-28	Loss	(Brazil) Aline Pereira	Glory 68: Miami	Miami, Florida	Decision (unanimous)	3	3:00	
2018-11-02	Win	(Canada) Ashley Nichols	Glory 61: New York	New York City, New York, United States	Decision (split)	3	3:00	
2017-12-16	Loss	(South Africa) Yolanda Schmidt	World Muay Thai Angels Tournament 2	Pattaya, Thailand	Decision	3	3:00	
World Muay Thai Angels Tournament 2 Finals.
2017-12-16	Win	(Thailand) Namtarn Por. Muangphet	World Muay Thai Angels Tournament 2	Pattaya, Thailand	Decision	3	2:00	
World Muay Thai Angels Tournament 2 Semi-Finals.
2017-11-18	Win	(England) Lucy Payne	World Muay Thai Angels Tournament 2	Pattaya, Thailand	Decision	3	2:00	
World Muay Thai Angels Tournament 2 Quarter-Finals.
2017-04-09	Win	(Turkey) Funda Diken Alkayis	World Muay Thai Angels Tournament 2	Bangkok, Thailand	TKO (knees and punches)	2		
World Muay Thai Angels Tournament 2 First-Round.
2016-08-04	Win	(Brazil) Taina Duarte	Saint-Tropez Fight Night	Saint-Tropez, France	Decision (unanimous)	5	2:00	
Won vacant the WMC Women's World Featherweight (-57.1 kg/126 lb) Championship.
2015-09-12	Win	(Italy) Donatella Panu	The Circle Fight Show	Barcelona, Spain	Decision	5	2:00	
2015-02-06	Win	(Poland) Martyna Krol	Angel Fight Extreme 3	Bangkok, Thailand	Points	3	2:00	
2014-12-16	Loss	(Sweden) Teresa Wintermyr	Sinbi Fight Night	Phuket, Thailand	Decision (unanimous)	5	2:00	
2014-12-05	Win	(Italy) Miriam Sabot	King's Cup	Bangkok, Thailand	Decision (unanimous)	3	2:00	
King's Cup Tournament Finals.
2014-12-05	Win	(Poland) Martyna Krol	King's Cup	Bangkok, Thailand	Decision (unanimous)	3	2:00	
King's Cup Tournament Semi-Finals.
2014-10-27	Win	(Italy) Miriam Sabot	Angel Fight Extreme	Bangkok, Thailand	Decision (unanimous)	3	2:00	
2014-08-04	Win	(Russia) Irina Mazepa	Saint-Tropez Fight Night	Saint-Tropez, France	Points	3	3:00	
2014-04-13	Win	(Italy) Sindy Huyer	World Muay Thai Angels	Bangkok, Thailand	Decision	3	3:00	
World Muay Thai Angels Tournament Finals.
2014-04-13	Win	(Sweden) Teresa Wintermyr	World Muay Thai Angels	Bangkok, Thailand	Decision	3	2:00	
World Muay Thai Angels Tournament Semi-Finals.
2014-03-15	Loss	(Australia) Caley Reece	Epic 10: Pressure	Perth, Australia	Decision	5	2:00	
For the WMC Women's World Featherweight (-57.1 kg/126 lb) Championship.
2013-11-07	Win	(Morocco) Iman Ghbalou Chairi	World Muay Thai Angels	Bangkok, Thailand	Decision	3	2:00	
World Muay Thai Angels Tournament Quarter-Finals.
2013-10-02	Win	(Hong Kong) Tang Sin Yi	World Muay Thai Angels	Bangkok, Thailand	Decision	3	2:00	
World Muay Thai Angels Tournament First-Round.
	Win	(Thailand) Sawsing Sor Sopit	Muay Thai event in Thailand	Thailand	Points	3	2:00	
	Loss	(Thailand) Sawsing Sor Sopit	Muay Thai event in Thailand	Thailand	Points	3	2:00	
	Loss	(Thailand) Sawsing Sor Sopit	Muay Thai event in Thailand	Thailand	Points	3	2:00	
	Win	(Thailand) Sawsing Sor Sopit	Muay Thai event in Thailand	Thailand	Points	3	2:00	
	Win	(Thailand) Namtarn Por. Muangphet	Muay Thai event in Thailand	Thailand	Points	3	2:00	
	Draw	(Thailand) Namtarn Por. Muangphet	Muay Thai event in Thailand	Thailand	Draw (majority)	3	2:00	
Legend: Win Loss Draw/No contest Notes

== Mixed martial arts record ==
Professional record breakdown
1 match	0 wins	1 loss
By knockout	0	0
By submission	0	1
By decision	0	0
No contests	0	

Res.	Record	Opponent	Method	Event	Date	Round	Time	Location	Notes
Loss	0-1	Anastasia Yankova	Submission (Armbar)	EFN - Fight Nights Petersburg	October 11, 2015	1	2:31	Saint Petersburg, Russia	
