= Kalyn Schwartz =

American MMA fighter

- Born: May 10, 1989 (age 37); Santee, California United States
- Nationality: American
- Height: 5 ft 5 in (165 cm)
- Weight: 116 lb (53 kg; 8 st 4 lb)
- Division: Strawweight (115 lbs)
- Fighting out of: Medford, Oregon United States
- Team: Alliance MMA; Rogue Combat Academy
- Years active: 2012–present

Mixed martial arts record
- Total: 4
- Wins: 3
- By knockout: 2
- By submission: 1
- Losses: 1
- By submission: 1

Other information
- Occupation: United States Marine Corps veteran
- University: Southern Oregon University
- Mixed martial arts record from Sherdog

Kalyn Schwartz (born May 10, 1989) is an American mixed martial artist. She competes in the strawweight division of the Invicta Fighting Championships.

== Background ==
Schwartz started training mixed martial arts (MMA) when serving as a United States Marine Corps at the Marine Corps Martial Arts Program, and started competing in amateur MMA in Oregon.

== Mixed martial arts career ==
=== Amateur career ===
Schwartz started her amateur career in 2014, and fought professionally four years later in 2016. She had four amateur fights under Rogue Fights, Rumble and King of the Cage (KOTC) promotions. She was the amateur bantamweight champion for Rogue Fights and Rumble at the Roseland in 2014 and she also the strawweight amateur champion for KOTC. She amassed a record of 6-0 prior signed by Invicta Fighting Championships (Invicta) in August 2016.

=== Invicta Fighting Championships ===
Schwartz made her promotional debut on March 23, 2016, at Invicta FC 19: Maia vs. Modafferi against two times formal world kickboxing champion Tiffany van Soest. She won the fight via a rear-naked choke. This win earned her the Invicta fan choice award (submission of the year). This win earned her the Invicta fan choice award (submission of the year)

Schwartz faced Miranda Maverick on March 25, 2017, at Invicta FC 22: Evinger vs. Kunitskaya 2 against Miranda Maverick. She lost the fight on round one.

Her next fight came on March 24, 2018, at Invicta FC 28: Mizuki vs. Jandiroba against Kay Hansen, and she won the fight via technical knock-out.

== Championships and accomplishments ==
=== Mixed martial arts ===
- Invicta Fighting Championships
  - Invicta Fighting Championships Fan Choice Awards (submission of the year) vs. Tifany van Soest

== Personal life ==
Schwartz attends Southern Oregon University (SOU), majoring in Fitness Technician, and she represents the women's 123 Ibs wrestling division for SOU.

Schwartz was a United States Marine Corps veteran, specializing in aircraft rescue and firefighting. "The biggest resemblance is the mental toughness and discipline," said Schwartz. "The Marines taught me discipline and intensity. I use that in wrestling every day.

== Mixed martial arts record ==
=== Professional Record ===
Professional record breakdown
3 matches	2 wins	1 loss
By knockout	1	0
By submission	1	1

Res.	Record	Opponent	Method	Event	Date	Round	Time	Location	Notes
Win	2–1	Kay Hansen	TKO (referee stoppage)	Invicta FC 28: Mizuki vs. Jandiroba	March 24, 2018	2	4:27	Chicago, Illinois, United States	
Loss	1–1	Miranda Maverick	Submission (armbar)	Invicta FC 22: Evinger vs. Kunitskaya 2	March 25, 2017	1	3:01	Nashville, Tennessee, United States	
Win	1–0	Tiffany van Soest	Submission (rear-naked choke)	Invicta FC 19: Maia vs. Modafferi	September 23, 2016	2	2:08	Charlotte, North Carolina, United States	

=== Amateur Record ===
Professional record breakdown
3 matches	2 wins	1 loss
By knockout	1	0
By submission	1	1

Res.	Record	Opponent	Method	Event	Date	Round	Time	Location	Notes
Win	4–0	Brittany Simms	Decision (unanimous)	KOTC: Rogue Wave	September 5, 2015	3	5:00	Lincoln City, Oregon, United States	Won the Strawweight Championship
Win	3–0	Rebecca Wells	Decision (unanimous)	KOTC: World Amateur Championships 2	April 18, 2015	3	5:00	Ontario, California, United States	
Win	2–0	Lisa Spangler	Decision (unanimous)	Rumble at the Roseland 79	December 6, 2014	3	5:00	Portland, Oregon, United States	Won the Bantamweight Championship
Win	1–0	Maria Corona	Decision (unanimous)	Rogue Fights 27	September 6, 2014	3	5:00	Medford, Oregon, United States	Won the Bantamweight Championship

== See also ==
- List of current Invicta FC fighters
- List of female mixed martial artists
