= Jemyma Betrian =

Dutch mixed martial artist and kickboxer

- Born: Jemyma Zippora Betrian; January 24, 1991 (age 35); Santa Rosa, Curaçao
- Other names: The Golden Girl
- Nationality: Dutch
- Height: 1.64 m (5 ft 4 1/2 in)
- Weight: 52 kg (115 lb)
- Division: Bantamweight
- Style: Kickboxing, Muay Thai, Boxing
- Fighting out of: Oosterhout, Netherlands
- Team: Team Explosion; KB Arnhem
- Trainer: Fred Royers
- Years active: 2005-present

Professional boxing record
- Total: 3
- Wins: 3
- By knockout: 2

Kickboxing record
- Total: 39
- Wins: 35
- Losses: 3
- By knockout: 1
- Draws: 1

Mixed martial arts record
- Total: 2
- Wins: 2
- By knockout: 2

Other information
- Boxing record from BoxRec
- Mixed martial arts record from Sherdog
- Last updated on: June 1, 2020

Jemyma Betrian (born January 24, 1991) is a Curaçaoan-born Dutch female kickboxer and boxer, based in Oosterhout, Netherlands. She competes professionally since 2005 and is the former WBC Muay Thai Bantamweight champion and mixed martial artist.

Between November 2016 and May 2018 she was ranked in the top ten pound for pound women in the world by Combat Press. As of April 2020, she is the #2 Super Bantamweight in the world by WBC Muaythai.

== Career ==
Betrian made had her professional fight in 2005 against Marouska Pruynboom. She lost a unanimous decision.

In 2007, she scored a TKO win over Suheyla Ozturk to win the MON Women's Dutch Flyweight title.

In 2010, Betrian defeated Christine Toledo to win WBC Muaythai Women's International Super Flyweight title.

During The Battle of Rotterdam Rebels 7, she defeated Linda Ooms to win the WFCA K-1 rules Women's European Bantamweight title.

Betrian challenged Tiffany van Soest for the IKKC Muaythai Women's World Super Bantamweight title. She failed to win the title, as the fight ended in a draw.

She defended the WBC Muaythai Women's World Bantamweight title, with a 30-second KO of Marcela Soto.

In her next fight, she won the IMTU Women's European Bantamweight title with a TKO win over Katia Semail, as Katia retired after the second round.

She defeated Thais Souza by third-round TKO at WCK Muay Thai: Matter of Pride in Temecula, California on February 15, 2014, to win the WKC Muaythai Women's World Bantamweight title.

During Kunlun Fight 3, she won a unanimous decision against E Meidie to win the WLF 52 kg Women's World Championship title.

She knocked out Christi Brereton in round two at WCK Muay Thai: International Showdown in Temecula, California on June 7, 2014, to retain the WBC Muaythai Women's World Bantamweight title.

== Titles ==
Professional

- 2014 WLF 52 kg Women's World Championship
- 2014 WKC Muaythai Women's World Bantamweight title
- 2013 IMTU Women's European Bantamweight Championship
- 2012 WBC Muaythai Women's World Bantamweight Championship (2 title defenses)
- 2010 WBC Muaythai Women's International Super Flyweight Championship
- 2010 WFCA K-1 rules Women's European Bantamweight Championship
- 2007 MON Women's Dutch Flyweight Championship

Amateur

- 2007 IFMA World Muaythai Championships in Bangkok, Thailand (silver) -54 kg

== Kickboxing record ==
Kickboxing record
35 wins (? KO's), 3 losses, 1 draw
Date	Result	Opponent	Event	Location	Method	Round	Time	Record
2016-08-06	Loss	(China) Gong Yanli	Glory Of Heroes 4	Changzhi, China	KO (Spinning Back fist)	3	2:59	
2015-02-10	Win	(Netherlands) Chandra Engel	Fight Night	Studio City, California, USA	KO	1		
Retains WBC Muaythai Women's World Bantamweight title.
2014-06-07	Win	(England) Christi Brereton	WCK Muay Thai: International Showdown	Temecula, California, USA	KO	2		35–2–1
Retains WBC Muaythai Women's World Bantamweight title.
2014-03-30	Win	(China) E Meidie	Kunlun Fight 3, Final	Harbin, China	Decision (Unanimous)	3	3:00	34–2–1
Wins WLF 52kg Women's World Championship title.
2014-03-30	Win	(France) Anisa Mackeson	Kunlun Fight 3, Semi-Final	Harbin, China	TKO	1	0:10	33–2–1
2014-02-15	Win	(Brazil) Thais Souza	WCK Muay Thai: Matter of Pride	Temecula, California, USA	TKO	3		32–2–1
Wins WKC Muaythai Women's World Bantamweight title.
2014-01-18	Win	(China) Wang Kehan	Wu Lin Feng	Hubei, China	Ext R. Decision (Unanimous)	4	3:00	31–2–1
2013-11-23	Win	(France) Katia Semail		Riom, France	TKO (Corner stoppage)	2		30–2–1
Wins IMTU Women's European Bantamweight title.
2013-04-06	Win	(Costa Rica) Marcela Soto	Bad to the Bone	Las Vegas, United States	KO	1	0:30	29–2–1
Retains WBC Muaythai Women's World Bantamweight title.
2012-11-11	Win	(Australia) Tiana Caverly		Las Vegas, United States	Decision (unanimous)	5	3:00	
Wins WBC Muaythai Women's World Bantamweight title.
2012-08-18	Draw	(United States) Tiffany van Soest	WCK Muay Thai: Nakamoto vs. Kitchen	Pala, California, USA	Draw (majority)	5	3:00	
For the IKKC Muaythai Women's World Super Bantamweight title.
2012-05-20	Win	(Japan) Ayano Oish		Nagoya, Japan	TKO	2		
2012-02-12	Win	(Netherlands) Mariela Kruse			Decision			
2011-12-23	Win	(Netherlands) Lorena Klijn	Klaar om te Bossen IV	Paramaribo, Surinam	Decision			
2011-11-12	Win	(Netherlands) Mellony Geugjes		Philipsburg, Sint Maarten	Decision			
2011-10-09	Win	(Croatia) Nevenka Mikulic	Muaythai Premier League	Padova, Italy	Decision	3	3:00	
2010-11-06	Win	(Netherlands) Linda Ooms	The Battle of Rotterdam Rebels 7	Rotterdam, Netherlands	KO	2		
Wins WFCA K-1 rules Women's European Bantamweight title.
2010-10-09	Win	(Lithuania) Liuba Mockeviciene		Russia	KO	1		
2010-04-17	Win	(United States) Christine Toledo	WCK Muay Thai	Primm, Nevada, USA	Decision (unanimous)	5	3:00	
Wins WBC Muaythai Women's International Super Flyweight title.
2010-03-07	Win	(Germany) Adriane Marksteiner		Nijmegen, Netherlands	Decision			
2009-11-24	Win	(Netherlands) Mariela Kruse		Nijmegen, Netherlands	Decision			
2009-02-01	Win	(Germany) Lisa Scheaffers		Nijmegen, Netherlands	TKO			
2008-06-29	Win	(Morocco) Chadia Azzaoui		Amsterdam, Netherlands	Decision			
2008-03-16	Win	(Netherlands) Priscilla Vergouwen		Wijchen, Netherlands	Decision			
2007-12-04	Loss	(Spain) Karla Benitez	IFMA 2007 World Muaythai Championships, Finals	Bangkok, Thailand				
For IFMA World Muaythai Championships 2007 Silver medal -54 kg
2007-12-03	Win	(Korea) Lim Su-Jeong	IFMA 2007 World Muaythai Championships, Semi Finals	Bangkok, Thailand				
2007-12-01	Win	(Australia)	IFMA 2007 World Muaythai Championships, Quarter Finals	Bangkok, Thailand				
2007-10-27	Win	(Turkey) Merve		Turkey				
2007-09-23	Win	(Netherlands) Noortje de Swart		Eindhoven, Netherlands	TKO			
2007-04-07	Win	(Turkey) Suheyla Ozturk	The Art of Muaythai, Finals	Apeldoorn, Netherlands	TKO			
Wins MON Women's Dutch Flyweight title.
2007-04-07	Win	(Turkey) Elmas Ulusoy	The Art of Muaythai, Semi Finals	Apeldoorn, Netherlands	TKO			
2007-02-04	Win	(Netherlands) Angel Alvarez		Eindhoven, Netherlands	TKO			
2006-12-10	Win	(Morocco) Rania		Den Bosch, Netherlands	Decision			
2006-11-19	Win	(Netherlands) Marouska Pruynboom		Deventer, Netherlands	Decision			
2006-10-14	Win	(Netherlands) Linda Willems		Deventer, Netherlands	TKO			
2006-05-27	Win	(Netherlands) Marouska Pruynboom		Tilburg, Netherlands	Decision			
2005-11-27	Loss	(Netherlands) Marouska Pruynboom		Valkenswaard, Netherlands	Decision			
Legend: Win Loss Draw/No contest Notes

== Mixed martial arts record ==
Professional record breakdown
2 matches	2 wins	0 losses
By knockout	2	0
By submission	0	0
By decision	0	0

Res.	Record	Opponent	Method	Event	Date	Round	Time	Location	Notes
Win	2–0	Chandra Engel	KO (Head Kick)	The Sportsmen's Lodge	February 20, 2015	1	4:03	Studio City, Los Angeles	
Win	1–0	Hadley Griffith	KO (Punches)	LOP - Chaos at the Casino 5	August 10, 2014	1	0:47	Los Angeles, United States	

== See also ==
- List of female kickboxers
