= Aline Pereira =

Brazilian kickboxer and mixed martial artist (born 1990)

- Born: Aline Silva Pereira Celso; October 6, 1990 (age 36); São Bernardo do Campo, Brazil
- Height: 5 ft 7 in (170 cm)
- Weight: 125 lb (57 kg; 8 st 13 lb)
- Division: Flyweight
- Reach: 70 in (178 cm)
- Style: Kickboxing
- Stance: Orthodox
- Fighting out of: São Bernardo do Campo, Brazil
- Team: Teixeira MMA & Fitness
- Trainer: Glover Teixeira
- Years active: 2017–present

Kickboxing record
- Total: 8
- Wins: 6
- By knockout: 1
- Losses: 2

Mixed martial arts record
- Total: 6
- Wins: 3
- By decision: 3
- Losses: 3
- By decision: 3

Other information
- Notable relatives: Alex Pereira (brother)
- Mixed martial arts record from Sherdog

Aline Silva Pereira Celso (born October 6, 1990) is a Brazilian mixed martial artist and kickboxer. She is the inaugural and current Karate Combat Women's Flyweight Champion. In mixed martial arts (MMA), she competed in the Flyweight division of Legacy Fighting Alliance (LFA), and in kickboxing she competed in Glory Kickboxing and fought for the Glory Super Bantamweight title in 2021.

== Personal life ==
Pereira has indigenous ancestry from the Pataxó tribe. Pereira's older brother, Alex, is a former UFC Light Heavyweight Champion and a former UFC Middleweight Champion as well as a former two-division Glory kickboxing champion. Pereira has a son. While pursuing her combat sports career in the United States, she has also worked Amazon delivery shifts to support herself and her family. In a 2025 interview with MMA Fighting, Pereira said the routine was tiring because she had to balance delivery work with training, but that she hoped to eventually live fully from fighting.

== Kickboxing career ==
=== Early career ===
After amassing an amateur career record of 21 wins and 3 losses, Pereira made her professional debut against Rayane Vieira at WGP Kickboxing 39 on July 22, 2017. She won the fight by unanimous decision. Pereira was afterwards scheduled to face Mayza Borges at WGP Kickboxing 44 on February 23, 2018, and was once again won by unanimous decision. Pererira's two-fight winning streak was stopped by Elaine Lopes, who beat her by unanimous decision at WGP Kickboxing 45 on May 5, 2018.

Pereira was scheduled to face Tatiana Campos at WGP Kickboxing 50 on October 27, 2018. She won the fight by unanimous decision. Pereira was then scheduled to face Nilcelia Pereira at Super Fighters 4 on June 8, 2019. She won the fight by unanimous decision. Following this victory, Pereira was signed by Glory.

=== Glory ===
Pereira made her promotional debut with Glory against Chommanee Sor Taehiran at Glory 68: Miami on September 28, 2019. She won the fight by unanimous decision.

Pereira was scheduled to face Crystal Lawson at Glory 71: Chicago on November 22, 2019. She won the fight by a first-round technical knockout, which was the first stoppage victory in her professional career.

Pereira challenged Tiffany van Soest for the Glory Super Bantamweight Championship at Glory 77: Rotterdam on January 30, 2021. Pereira lost the fight by unanimous decision.

== Mixed martial arts career ==
=== LFA ===
Pereira was scheduled to make her mixed martial arts debut for Legacy Fighting Alliance (LFA) against Helen Peralta at Legacy Fighting Alliance 147: Melo vs. Costa on November 18, 2022. Pereira lost the fight by unanimous decision.

Pereira faced Chelsea Conner at Legacy Fighting Alliance 160: Sweeney vs. Begosso on June 16, 2023. She won the fight by unanimous decision.

Pereira faced Cheyanne Bowers at Legacy Fighting Alliance 168: McKee vs. McPadden on September 22, 2023. She lost the fight by unanimous decision.

=== Most Valuable Promotions ===
Pereira faced Jade Masson-Wong on May 16, 2026 at MVP MMA 1. She won the fight by split decision.

=== Dana White's Contender Series ===
Pereira faced Smilla Sundell on October 13, 2026 at Dana White's Contender Series 96 and lost the bout by unanimous decision.

== Karate Combat career ==
Pereira made her debut in Karate Combat at Karate Combat 50 on October 11, 2024, facing Dee Begley. She won the fight, knocking out Begley in the first round.

On January 24, 2025, Pereira faced Amanda Torres at Karate Combat 52 and won by second-round technical knockout (TKO) after landing a left hook.

On July 19, 2025, Pereira faced Fani Peloumpi for the inaugural Karate Combat Women's Flyweight Championship. She won the bout by unanimous decision.

== Championships and accomplishments ==
- Karate Combat

- Karate Combat Women's Flyweight Championship (Inaugural; Current)

== Kickboxing record ==
Kickboxing record
6 Wins (1 (T)KO's), 2 Losses, 0 Draw, 0 No Contest
| Date | Result | Opponent | Event | Location | Method | Round | Time |
| 2021-01-30 | Loss | (United States) Tiffany van Soest | Glory 77: Rotterdam | Rotterdam, Netherlands | Decision (Unanimous) | 5 | 3:00 |
For the Glory Super Bantamweight Championship.
| 2019-11-22 | Win | (United States) Crystal Lawson | Glory 71: Chicago | Chicago, United States | TKO (3 Knockdown Rule) | 1 | 0:59 |
| 2019-09-28 | Win | (Thailand) Chommanee Sor Taehiran | Glory 68: Miami | Miami, United States | Decision (Unanimous) | 3 | 3:00 |
| 2019-06-08 | Win | (Brazil) Nilcelia Pereira | Super Fighters 4 | South Zone of São Paulo, Brazil | Decision (Unanimous) | 3 | 3:00 |
| 2018-10-27 | Win | (Brazil) Tatiana Campos | WGP Kickboxing 50 | São Bernardo do Campo, Brazil | Decision (Unanimous) | 3 | 3:00 |
| 2018-05-05 | Loss | (Brazil) Elaine Lopes | WGP Kickboxing 45, Tournament Semifinal | Sorocaba, Brazil | Decision (Unanimous) | 3 | 3:00 |
| 2018-02-23 | Win | (Brazil) Mayza Borges | WGP Kickboxing 44 | São Bernardo do Campo, Brazil | Decision (Unanimous) | 3 | 3:00 |
| 2017-07-22 | Win | (Brazil) Rayane Vieira | WGP Kickboxing 39 | Vitória, Espírito Santo, Brazil | Decision (Unanimous) | 3 | 3:00 |
Legend: Win Loss Draw/No contest Notes

== Mixed martial arts record ==
Professional record breakdown
| 6 matches | 3 wins | 3 losses |
| By decision | 3 | 3 |

| Res. | Record | Opponent | Method | Event | Date | Round | Time | Location | Notes |
|---|---|---|---|---|---|---|---|---|---|
| Loss | 3–3 | Smilla Sundell | Decision (unanimous) | Dana White's Contender Series 96 | October 13, 2026 | 3 | 5:00 | Las Vegas, Nevada, United States | Bantamweight debut. |
| Win | 3–2 | Jade Masson-Wong | Decision (split) | MVP MMA: Rousey vs. Carano | May 16, 2026 | 3 | 5:00 | Inglewood, California, United States | Catchweight (130 lb) bout. |
| Win | 2–2 | Nejra Repp | Decision (unanimous) | LFA 222 | November 14, 2025 | 3 | 5:00 | Mashantucket, Connecticut, United States | |
| Loss | 1–2 | Cheyanne Bower | Decision (unanimous) | LFA 168 | September 22, 2023 | 3 | 5:00 | Prior Lake, Minnesota, United States | |
| Win | 1–1 | Chelsea Conner | Decision (unanimous) | LFA 160 | June 16, 2023 | 3 | 5:00 | Owensboro, Kentucky, United States | |
| Loss | 0–1 | Helen Peralta | Decision (unanimous) | LFA 147 | November 18, 2022 | 3 | 5:00 | Sloan, Iowa, United States | Flyweight debut. |

== Karate Combat record ==
Professional record breakdown
| 3 matches | 3 wins | 0 losses |
| By knockout | 2 | 0 |
| By decision | 1 | 0 |

| Res. | Record | Opponent | Method | Event | Date | Round | Time | Location | Notes |
|---|---|---|---|---|---|---|---|---|---|
| Win | 3–0 | Fani Peloumpi | Decision (unanimous) | Karate Combat 56 | July 19, 2025 | 5 | 3:00 | Miami, Florida United States | Won the inaugural Karate Combat Women's Flyweight Championship. |
| Win | 2–0 | Amanda Torres | TKO (left hook) | Karate Combat 52 | January 24, 2025 | 2 | 0:57 | Miami, Florida United States | |
| Win | 1–0 | Dee Begley | KO (left hook) | Karate Combat 50 | October 11, 2024 | 1 | 2:26 | Salt Lake City, Utah, United States | Catchweight bout; Begley missed weight. |

== See also ==
- List of female kickboxers

Awards and achievements
| New championship | 1st Karate Combat Women's Flyweight Champion; July 19, 2025 – present | Incumbent |
