= International Kickboxing Federation =

Organizations of kickboxing and Muay Thai

- Type: Private
- Industry: Kickboxing Sanctioning Body
- Founded: 1992
- Headquarters: Newcastle, CA, United States
- Website: ikffightsports.com

The International Kickboxing Federation (IKF) is a sanctioning body for kickboxing and Muay Thai based in the United States. The IKF sanctions and regulates all aspects of these sports from Semi Contact (IKF Point Kickboxing (IKF/PKB)) to Full Contact in both Amateur and professional levels. The IKF World Headquarters located in Newcastle, California, USA oversees over 2,000 IKF events a year around the world.

== Styles ==
IKF sanctions and regulates both professional and amateur Kickboxing and Muay Thai around the world in six different rule styles:

- American Kickboxing: Above the Waist
- International Rules: Leg Kicks Allowed
- Muay Thai: Allowing Knees and Elbows
- Point Kickboxing: Semi-Contact ( www.IKFPKB.com )
- Sanshou: All of the above along with Throws

The IKF has also introduced new styles over the years:

=== Modified Muay Thai ===
Prohibiting Knees and Elbows to the Head but Allowing Knees to the Body or Limited Clinching

=== Xtreme Gladiator ===
Muay Thai, MMA & Sanshou with a 30-second time limit for ground fighting

=== Unified Rules ===
Modified/Limited Muay Thai - K-1 - Glory Style Rules Combined. Limited Knees - Clinch ONLY If followed By Immediate Strike

The IKF has both male and female titles (State, Regional, National, Continental, Intercontinental and World) and both Pro and Amateur rankings.

== History ==
In 1992, Steve Fossum and Dan Stell founded the IKF, based on their knowledge and experience as former kickboxers, trainers and event promoters. In July 1996, Stell stepped down as Vice President staying on as Head of Officials. In December 1996, the IKF launched a website with news updates for various events, worldwide rankings, rules and regulations.

In 1998, the IKF expanded into the United Kingdom and began sanctioning events in England, Scotland, Wales, Ireland and other European countries.

In 2007, Neil Holden took the position of Director for IKF Europe for a while. Replacing Holden was Carl Sams and Colin Payne, both previously in charge of IKF Full Contact activity in the United Kingdom. Both are part of the IKF Europe Team. They are currently foCusing on growth and activity in the United Kingdom as Co-Directors for IKF Europe under all IKF rule styles.

The IKF has developed into a global organization under the direction of Steve Fossum and others associated with the IKF World Team. Along with this growth was the creation of the IKF Amateur Tournaments. The IKF created the first amateur kickboxing tournament in the United States in 1999, the IKF USA National Championships. The annual event grew to a North American Championships in 2004 and eventually into the IKF World Classic in 2006. Today the IKF World Classic is one of the largest all AMATEUR Muay Thai and Kickboxing Championship tournaments in the world.

Fossum is also the president of the first ever Mixed Martial Arts (MMA) sanctioning body, International Sport Combat Federation (ISCF) and is the president and CEO of The International Fight Sports (IFS) which oversees several Fight Sport Companies who have a mutual goal of fostering national and international Professional and Amateur fight sport competition through the sanctioning of Fight Sports.

== Regulations ==
IKF Rules & Regulations cover all medical requirements from the fighter to the ringside medical staff. The IKF requires a doctor and at least two paramedics equipped with resuscitation equipment to be on site for all sanctioned events.

On March 17, 2014, the California State Athletic Commission officially delegated to the IKF, International Kickboxing Federation the exclusive authority to regulate Amateur Kickboxing and Muay Thai (Ages 8 and Up) in the State of California.

== Weight Classes (Adult) ==
Weight class name	Upper limit	Gender
Atomweight	107 lb (48.534 kg)	Feminine
Strawweight	112 lb (50.802 kg)	Feminine / Masculine
Flyweight	117 lb (53.070 kg)	Feminine / Masculine
Bantamweight	122 lb (55.338 kg)	Feminine / Masculine
Featherweight	127 lb (57.606 kg)	Feminine / Masculine
Lightweight	132 lb (59.874 kg)	Feminine / Masculine
Super Lightweight	137 lb (62.142 kg)	Feminine / Masculine
Light Welterweight	142 lb (64.410 kg)	Feminine / Masculine
Welterweight	147 lb (66.678 kg)	Feminine / Masculine
Super Welterweight	153 lb (69.400 kg)	Feminine / Masculine
Light Middleweight	159 lb (72.121 kg)	Feminine / Masculine
Middleweight	165 lb (74.843 kg)	Feminine / Masculine
Super Middleweight	171 lb (77.564 kg)	Feminine / Masculine
Light Heavyweight	178 lb (80.739 kg)	Masculine
Light Cruiserweight	185 lb (83.915 kg)	Masculine
Cruiserweight	195 lb (88.451 kg)	Masculine
Super Cruiserweight	215 lb (97.522 kg)	Masculine
Heavyweight	235 lb (106.594 kg)	Masculine
Super Heavyweight	No weight limit	Masculine
