= Abderrahim Chafay =

French male kickboxer

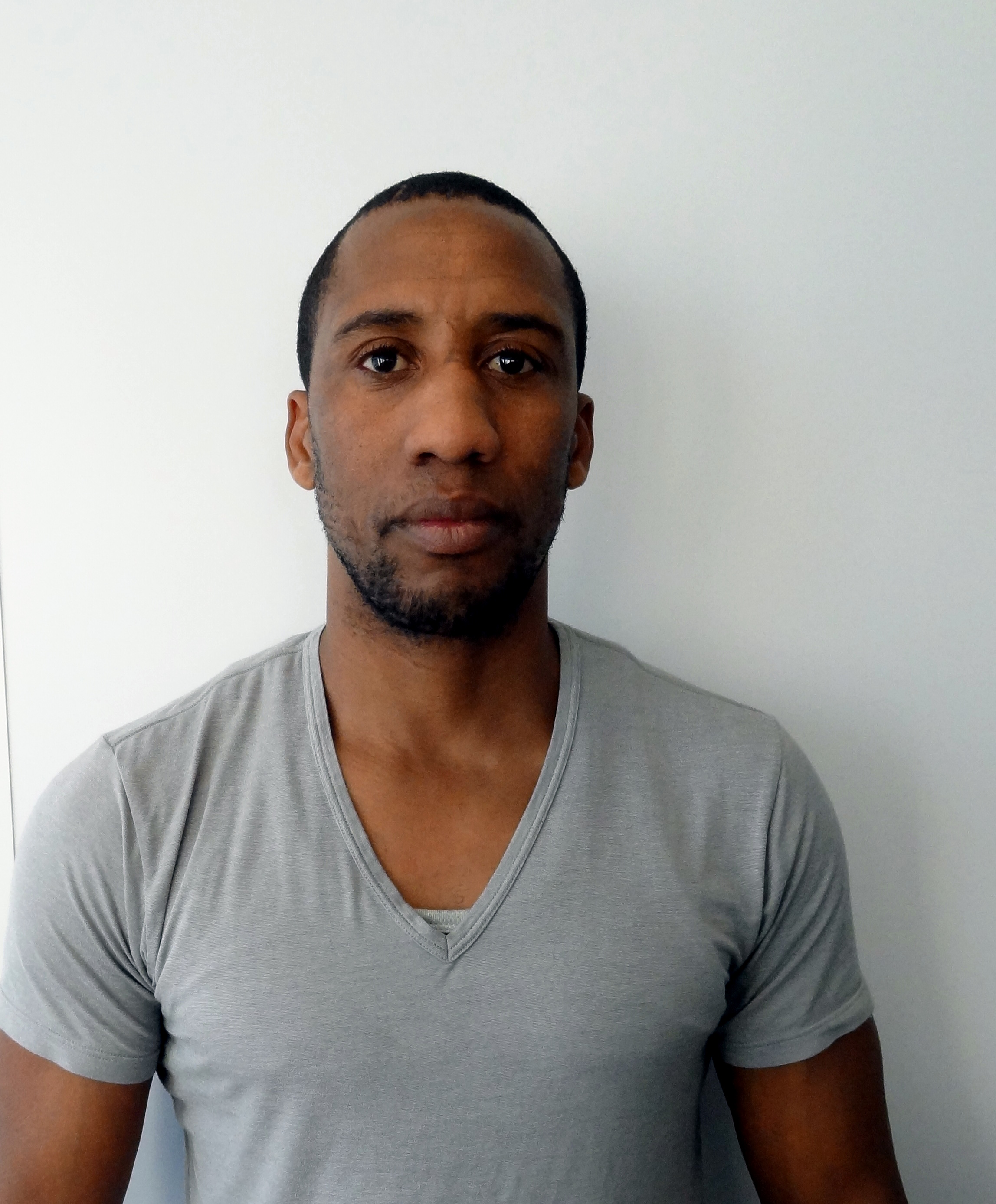
- Born: 21 July 1977 (age 49); Marrakesh, Morocco
- Other names: Requin
- Nationality: French
- Height: 1.88 m (6 ft 2 in)
- Weight: 81 kg (179 lb; 12 st 11 lb)
- Division: Middleweight
- Style: Kickboxing
- Fighting out of: Paris, France
- Team: Red's Team
- Trainer: Redha Sadouki
- Years active: 2008–2014

Kickboxing record
- Total: 18
- Wins: 9
- By knockout: 6
- Losses: 9
- By knockout: 9

Abderrahim Chafay (born 21 July 1977) is a Moroccan-French Muay Thai kickboxer.

== Biography ==
In 2011, Chafay challenged the reigning WAKO World Low Kick champion Salko Zildžić for the title. He defeated Salko through a second round KO.

Chafay fought Cyril Benzaquen for the FFSCDA -81 kg title during the inaugural Night Fighter event. Benzaquen won the fight by a third round TKO.

His last fight, before taking a six year break from the sport, was a rematch with Salko Žildžić. Žildžić won their rematch in the third round, by TKO.

Returning from his break, Chafay was scheduled to fight Andrey Chekhonin for the WAKO World Low Kick 85.1 kg title. Chekhonin won the fight by a first round KO.

== Titles and accomplishments ==
- 2011 FFSCDA Muay Thai -81 kg Champion
- 2011 WAKO World Low Kick -85.1 kg Champion
- 2012 FFSCDA Kickboxing -81 kg Champion

== Fight record ==
Professional kickboxing record
9 wins (6 (T)KOs), 9 losses, 0 draws, 0 no contests
Date	Result	Opponent	Event	Location	Method	Round	Time
2020-02-22	Loss	(Russia) Andrey Chekhonin	Senshi 5	Varna, Bulgaria	TKO	1	
For the WAKO World Low Kick -85.1kg title.
2014-05-23	Loss	(Bosnia and Herzegovina) Salko Zildžić	Noć Šampiona VII	Tuzla, Bosnia and Herzegovina	TKO	3	
2014-04-26	Loss	(France) Cyril Benzaquen	Night Fighter 1	Toulouse, France	TKO	3	
For the FFSCDA -81kg title.
2014-01-25	Loss	(Slovakia) Vladimír Moravčík	Clash Muay Thai	Bratislava, Slovakia	KO	1	
2013-03-16	Win	(France) Didier Charlesege	Kick Imperator V - K1 Rules Explosion	L'Île-Rousse, France	Decision (unanimous)	5	3:00
2013-03-03	Loss	(Belgium) Alka Matewa	Ikuza 2	Brussels, Belgium	TKO	4	
2012-12-15	Win	(Croatia) Marina Rosu	Croatia Open 2012 - Christamas Cup	Osijek, Croatia	Decision (unanimous)	5	3:00
2012-06-22	Loss	(France) Yassine Ahaggan	Carcharias	Perpignan, France	KO	1	
2012-06-01	Loss	(France) Yassine Ahaggan	Impacts Fight Night: championnats d'Europe WBC	Bordeaux, France	TKO	2	
2012-05-12	Win	(France) Alassane Sy	Championnat De France Elite K1	Bompas, France	Decision (unanimous)	5	3:00
Wins the FFSCDA Kickboxing -81kg title.
2012-02-11	Loss	(Russia) Alexander Gordei	WAKO World Grand Prix K1 Rules France/Russie	Marseille, France	KO	1	
2011-12-28	Win	(Bosnia and Herzegovina) Salko Zildžić	Night Of Champions VI	Tuzla, Bosnia and Herzegovina	KO	2	
Wins the WAKO World Low Kick -85.1kg title.
2011-05-07	Win	(France) Malik Aliane	Finales Championnat De France Muaythai	Paris, France	TKO	4	
Wins the FFSCDA Muay Thai -81kg title.
2011-03-26	Win	(France)	1/2 Finales Championnat de France De Muaythai FFSCDA	Paris, France	KO		
2010-11-06	Win	(France) Fatah Abderrezak	Shock Muay 3	Saint-Denis, Réunion	KO	4	
2010-04-03	Loss	(France) Johane Beausejour	Finales du Championnat de France de Muaythai	Paris, France	TKO	3	
For the FFSCDA Muay Thai -81kg title.
2009-05-23	Win	(France) Kader Doumbia	Shock Muay 2	Saint-Denis, Réunion	TKO	1	
2009-05-23	Win	(France) Kader Doumbia	Shock Muay	Saint-Denis, Réunion	TKO	1	
Legend: Win Loss Draw/no contest Notes

== See also ==
- List of male kickboxers
