= Ulrich Tiebe =

Ivoirian-French kickboxer (born 1998)

- Born: 14 October 1998 (age 28); Grand-Béréby , Ivory Coast
- Other names: Le Babatchai
- Height: 190 cm (6 ft 3 in)
- Weight: 85 kg (187 lb; 13.4 st)
- Division: Middleweight
- Style: Kickboxing
- Stance: Orthodox
- Years active: 2017–present

Kickboxing record
- Total: 12
- Wins: 10
- By knockout: 4
- Losses: 2

Ulrich Tiebe (born October 14, 1998), also known as Axel Tiebe, nicknamed Le Babatchai and Goriphant is a French-Ivorian professional kickboxer competing in the middleweight division. He is a Glory Kickboxing fighter, the world's leading kickboxing organization.

== Biography ==
Ulrich Tiebe began boxing as an amateur in 2017 and immediately won the brittany cup. On 22 October 2020, he won the amateur world championship title in Rome, which launched his career toward the professional ranks. On October 24, 2021, he took part in his first professional bouts at the K1 World Championship in Rome. Tiebe won the French national champion title in 2024.

In April 2024, Tiebe officially joined Glory Kickboxing. He was scheduled to fight Vito Kosar at Glory 95 in Zagreb on 21 September 2024, but the bout was cancelled due to the death of a close family member.

== Notable kickboxing fights ==
Kickboxing record
10 Wins (4(T)KO's), 2Losses, 0 No Contests
Date	Result	Opponent	Event	Location	Method	Round	Time
2025-04-05	Win	(Ukraine) Sergi Libuchenko	Skendo's Fight Night	Zurich, Switzerland	Decision (unanimous)	3	3:00
2024-11-02	Win	(France) Daniel Krost	RFN 1	Rennes, France	Decision (unanimous)	3	3:00
2024-03-25	Win	(France) Frédéric Kowac	Monterfil Boxing	Monterfil, France	KO	2	3:00
2024-03-02	Win	(France) I.B Doukansi	MTGP	Paris, France	TKO	2	3:00
2023-09-02	Win	(France) Emmanuel Mahout	Nuit des Titans 23	Troyes, France	TKO	2	3:00
2023-03-01	Loss	(France) Gregory Grossi	Le Choc des Champions	Nice, France	Decision (Split)	3	3:00
2023-04-06	Loss	(Bulgaria) Aleksandar Petrov	Max Fight 53	Nice, France	Decision (Split)	3	3:00
2023-03-31	Win	(France) Ramy Deghir	Elite Fight 9	Saint-Brieuc, France	Decision (unanimous)	3	3:00
Legend: Win Loss Draw/No contest

== See also ==
- Current Glory List : List of current Glory fighters
- Male Kickboxers List : List of male kickboxers
