= Men's K-1 at WAKO World Championships 2007 Belgrade -71 kg =

Kickboxing tournament

The men's light middleweight (71 kg/156.2 lbs) K-1 category at the W.A.K.O. World Championships 2007 in Belgrade was the sixth lightest of the K-1 tournaments, involving twelve fighters all based in Europe. Each of the matches was three rounds of two minutes each and were fought under K-1 rules.

Owing to the low number of fighters for a sixteen-man tournament, four of the contestants had byes through to the quarter-finals. The tournament winner was Belarus's Dmitry Valent who won gold by defeating his Russian opponent Rizvan Isaev. Semi finalists Djime Coulibaly from France and Italian Manuele Raini were rewarded for the efforts with bronze medals.

== Egypt ==
1st round
(Turkey) Irfan Berme
(France) Djime Coulibaly | WIN
(Belarus) Dmitry Valent | WIN
(Croatia) Branko Mikulić
(Hungary) Csaba Betrok
(Azerbaijan) Vugar Kazimov | WIN
(Ukraine) Andriy Movshenko | WIN
(Bulgaria) Velieziv Javkoy

Quarter-finals
(Serbia) Milos Mihaljevic
(France) Djime Coulibaly | WIN
(Austria) Osami Adil
(Belarus) Dmitry Valent | WIN
(Italy) Manuele Raini | WIN
(Azerbaijan) Vugar Kazimov
(Ukraine) Andriy Movshenko
(Russia) Rizvan Isaev | WIN

Semi-finals
(France) Djime Coulibaly
(Belarus) Dmitry Valent | WIN
(Italy) Manuele Raini
(Russia) Rizvan Isaev | WIN

Final
(Belarus) Dmitry Valent | WIN
(Russia) Rizvan Isaev

== See also ==
- List of WAKO Amateur World Championships
- List of WAKO Amateur European Championships
- List of male kickboxers
