= Kickboxing at the 2017 World Games – Men's light heavyweight =

Kickboxing - Men's light heavyweight at the 2017 World Games
- Venue: Orbita Hall, Wrocław, Poland
- Dates: 26–27 July 2017
- Competitors: 8 from 8 nations

Medalists
gold medal	(Serbia) Aleksandar Menković
silver medal	(Bulgaria) Aleksandar Petrov
bronze medal	(United States) Omari Boyd

The men's light heavyweight competition in kickboxing at the 2017 World Games took place from 26 to 27 July 2017 at the Orbita Hall in Wrocław, Poland.

== Competition format ==
A total of 8 athletes entered the competition. They fought in the cup system.

== Results ==
Quarterfinals
(Serbia) Aleksandar Menković	3
(Moldova) Denis Telesman	0
(Poland) Arkadiusz Kaszuba	3
(Iran) Ali Khanjari	0
(Mauritius) Veejaye Agathe	0
(United States) Omari Boyd	3
(Russia) Aleksandr Dmitrenko	0
(Bulgaria) Aleksandar Petrov	3

Semifinals
(Serbia) Aleksandar Menković	WO
(Poland) Arkadiusz Kaszuba
(United States) Omari Boyd	0
(Bulgaria) Aleksandar Petrov	3

Final
(Serbia) Aleksandar Menković	WO
(Bulgaria) Aleksandar Petrov

Third place
(Poland) Arkadiusz Kaszuba
(United States) Omari Boyd	WO
