= Cédric Tousch =

French male kickboxer (born 1989)

- Born: 29 May 1989 (age 37); Sarreguemines, France
- Height: 1.90 m (6 ft 3 in)
- Weight: 81 kg (179 lb; 12 st 11 lb)
- Division: Light Heavyweight
- Style: Kickboxing, Muay thai
- Fighting out of: Strasbourg, France
- Team: Thaiboxing Behren
- Years active: 2011–2017, 2023–present

Kickboxing record
- Total: 35
- Wins: 32
- By knockout: 14
- Losses: 3
- By knockout: 0

Other information
- Boxing record from BoxRec

Cédric Tousch (born 29 May 1989) is a French kickboxer and Nak Muay. He is the former WBC Muaythai World Light Heavyweight champion and the former WAKO World Light Heavyweight K-1 champion.

He is also the former WMC and ICO European Light Heavyweight champion, as well as the FFSCDA champion.

== Martial arts career ==
In March 2015 Tousch fought a rematch with Djibril Ehouo, with the WMC European belt on the line. Toushch won the belt after five rounds, through a unanimous decision. Winning the continental title allowed Toush to fight Malyck Tavares for the WBC Muaythai World Light Heavyweight title. He won the fight by a unanimous decision.

This fight gained Tousch notoriety in the kickboxing world and earned him a chance to fight with Glory. In his sole appearance with the organization he fought Cyril Benzaquen during Glory 28, winning the fight by a unanimous decision. In his next fight he would again win a unanimous decision, this time against Khalid El Bakouri during King Of The Ring 5.

Following this streak, Tousch was given a chance to fight Gabriele Casella for the WAKO K-1 Light Heavyweight title. Casella was forced to withdraw from the fight and was replaced by Aleksandar Petrov. Tousch won the fight by a unanimous decision.

After this he fought his sole fight with Kunlun Fight. He faced Dmitry Valent during Kunlun Fight 51. Tousch lost for the second time in his professional career, dropping a decision.

His last professional bout was a title defense of the WBC Muaythai belt. He won a unanimous decision over Aydin Tuncay, ending his career on a win.

== Championships and accomplishments ==
=== Professional ===
- Fédération Française de Kick Boxing, Muaythaï et Disciplines Associées
  - 2012 FFSCDA National Muay Thai Light Heavyweight Champion
- International Combat Organization
  - 2012 ICO European Light Heavyweight Champion
- World Muaythai Council
  - 2015 WMC European Light Heavyweight Champion
- World Boxing Council Muaythai
  - 2016 WBC Muaythai World Light Heavyweight Champion
    - One successful title defense
- World Association of Kickboxing Organizations
  - 2016 WAKO World K-1 Light Heavyweight Champion
- World Kickboxing Network
  - 2026 WKN World K-1 Light Heavyweight (-82.1 kg) Champion

=== Amateur ===
- International Federation of Muaythai Associations
  - 2012 IFMA World Championships B-class -81 kg (gold)

== Fight record ==
Professional Kickboxing Record
32 Wins (14 (T)KO's), 3 Losses, 0 Draw, 0 No Contest
| Date | Result | Opponent | Event | Location | Method | Round | Time |
| 2026-11-21 | Win | (Argentina) Javier Aparicio | Ultimate Muaythai / K1 Rules 9 | Strasbourg, France | KO | 2 | |
Wins the vacant WKN K-1 World Light Heavyweight (-82.1 kg) title.
| 2025-11-22 | Win | (Turkey) Samet İşçan | Loca Fight Club | Istanbul, Turkey | Decision | 3 | 3:00 |
| 2025-10-25 | Win | (Morocco) Ilyass Chakir | Kernfightwerk 5 | Völklingen, Germany | Decision (Unanimous) | 3 | 3:00 |
| 2024-11-16 | Win | (France) Assane Bafeta | Ultimate Muaythai / K1 Rules 7 | Strasbourg, France | Decision (Unanimous) | 3 | 3:00 |
| 2024-08-31 | Loss | (Morocco) Anwar Ouled-Chaib | Glory 94 | Antwerp, Belgium | Decision (Unanimous) | 3 | 3:00 |
| 2023-11-18 | Win | (France) Sofiane Gelin | Ultimate Muaythai / K1 Rules 6 | Paris, France | TKO (Referee stoppage) | 2 | |
| 2023-09-30 | Win | (France) Leutrasse Antzouana | Kernfightwerk 2 | Saarbrücken, Germany | TKO (Retirement) | 1 | 3:00 |
| 2017-02-04 | Win | (France) Aydin Tuncay | La Nuit Des Challenges 17 | Mulhouse, France | Decision (Unanimous) | 5 | 3:00 |
Defends the WBC Muaythai World Light Heavyweight title.
| 2016-08-10 | Loss | (Belarus) Dmitry Valent | Kunlun Fight 51 | Fuzhou, China | Decision (Unanimous) | 4 | 3:00 |
| 2016-06-24 | Win | (Bulgaria) Aleksandar Petrov | Monte-Carlo Fighting Masters | Monaco, Monaco | Decision (Unanimous) | 5 | 3:00 |
Wins the WAKO Pro K-1 World Light Heavyweight title.
| 2016-04-09 | Win | (Netherlands) Khalid El Bakouri | King Of The Ring 5 | Longeville-lès-Metz, France | Decision (Unanimous) | 3 | 3:00 |
| 2016-03-12 | Win | (France) Cyril Benzaquen | Glory 28 | Paris, France | Decision (Unanimous) | 3 | 3:00 |
| 2016-02-27 | Win | (Portugal) Malyck Tavares | La Grande Soirée de la Boxe | La Riche, France | Decision (Unanimous) | 5 | 3:00 |
Wins the WBC Muaythai World Light Heavyweight title.
| 2015-09-12 | Loss | (Ukraine) Artur Kyshenko | It's Fight Time 2 | Darmstadt, Germany | Decision (Unanimous) | 3 | 3:00 |
| 2015-06-13 | Win | (Belgium) Mbamba Cauwenbergh | Championnat du Monde WKN K1 Rules | Strasbourg, France | Decision (Unanimous) | 3 | 3:00 |
| 2015-06-13 | Win | (Germany) Omer Kocak | La Nuit des Guerriers | Bitche, France | KO | 1 | |
| 2015-03-14 | Win | (France) Djibril Ehouo | Grande Soirée de la Boxe | La Riche, France | Decision (Unanimous) | 5 | 3:00 |
Wins the WMC Europe Light Heavyweight title.
| 2015-01-31 | Win | (Belgium) Madani Rahmani | Emperor Chok Dee | Vandœuvre-lès-Nancy, France | TKO (Injury) | 2 | 3:00 |
| 2014-05-17 | Win | (France) Sofian Mwayembe | Radikal Fight Night 2 | Charleville-Mézières, France | TKO (Retirement) | 2 | 3:00 |
| 2014-03-01 | Win | (Spain) Imanol Rodriguez | La Nuit des Spartiates IV | Sarreguemines, France | Decision (Unanimous) | 3 | 3:00 |
| 2014-02-01 | Win | (France) Djibril Ehouo | Grande Soirée de la Boxe, Tournament Final | La Riche, France | Decision (Unanimous) | 3 | 3:00 |
Won the GSB Tournament title
| 2014-02-01 | Win | (Sweden) Niklas Karlsson | Grande Soirée de la Boxe, Tournament Semifinal | La Riche, France | Decision (Unanimous) | 3 | 3:00 |
| 2013-11-02 | Win | (Switzerland) Janosch Nietlispach | Elite Fight Night, Tournament Final | Heidenheim, Germany | TKO | 2 | |
Won the EFN Tournament title.
| 2013-11-02 | Win | (Germany) Simon Hinkle | Elite Fight Night, Tournament Semifinal | Heidenheim, Germany | Decision (Unanimous) | 3 | 3:00 |
| 2013-06-29 | Win | (France) Sébastien Laplane | Red Devil Muay Thai Ultimate | Freyming-Merlebach, France | TKO (Injury) | 3 | |
| 2013-06-08 | Win | (Germany) Falk Monzeel | La Voie des champions | Oberkorn, Luxembourg | Decision (Unanimous) | 3 | 3:00 |
| 2013-06-01 | Win | (Belgium) Laurent Atrifi | Le Défi Lorrain | Epinal, France | Decision (Unanimous) | 3 | 3:00 |
| 2013-05-04 | Win | (Netherlands) Mehmet Arslan | King of the Ring 2 | Longeville-lès-Metz, France | TKO (Retirement) | 3 | |
| 2013-03-09 | Win | (France) Raouf Nouainia | Grande Soirée de la Boxe | La Riche, France | TKO | 2 | |
| 2013-01-26 | Win | (Spain) Imanol Rodriguez | Nuit des Spartiates III | Sarreguemines, France | Decision (Unanimous) | 3 | 3:00 |
| 2012-10-27 | Win | (France) Herman Nolga | King's of the Ring 2 | Châlons-en-Champagne, France | Decision (Unanimous) | 3 | 3:00 |
Wins the ICO European Light Heavyweight Championship.
| 2012-07-07 | Win | (Germany) Dimitri Menchanikov | Fight Night | Offenbourg, Germany | KO | 2 | |
| 2012-05-05 | Win | (France) Fatah Abderrezak | King of the Ring | Longeville-lès-Metz, France | KO | 2 | |
Wins the FFSCDA National Muay Thai Light Heavyweight Championship.
| 2012-03-17 | Win | (France) Amadou N'Diaye | 1/2 finales Championnat de France de Muaythai | Dreux, France | KO | 3 | |
| 2011-11-12 | Win | (France) Malik Aliane | Nuit des Spartiates II | Sarreguemines, France | KO | 1 | |
Legend: Win Loss Draw/No contest Notes

Amateur Muay Thai Record
| Date | Result | Opponent | Event | Location | Method | Round | Time |
|---|---|---|---|---|---|---|---|
| 2012-09-15 | Win | (Czech Republic) Lukas Wolf | 2012 IFMA World Championships, Tournament Final | Saint Petersburg, Russia | TKO (Doctor's stoppage) | | |
Wins the 2012 IFMA World Championships -81kg Gold Medal.
| 2012-09-13 | Win | (Turkey) Turgut Kocakaya | 2012 IFMA World Championships, Tournament Semifinal | Saint Petersburg, Russia | TKO (Doctor's stoppage) | | |
| 2012-09-11 | Win | (Denmark) Kim Nielsen | 2012 IFMA World Championships, Tournament Quarterfinal | Saint Petersburg, Russia | Decision | 3 | 2:00 |
| 2012-09-09 | Win | (Russia) Evgeniy Lyrshchikov | 2012 IFMA World Championships, Tournament Opening Round | Saint Petersburg, Russia | Decision | 3 | 2:00 |
Legend: Win Loss Draw/No contest Notes

== See also ==
- List of male kickboxers
