= Sher Mamazulunov =

Uzbekistani kickboxer

- Born: Sher Mamazulunov Hambahadov; May 17, 1995 (age 31); Tashkent, Uzbekistan
- Native name: Шер Мамазулунов
- Nationality: Uzbek
- Height: 1.82 m (5 ft 11 1/2 in)
- Weight: 85 kg (187 lb; 13.4 st)
- Style: Muay Thai, Kickboxing
- Stance: Orthodox
- Fighting out of: Moscow, Russia
- Team: Rus Gym

Kickboxing record
- Total: 43
- Wins: 36
- By knockout: 5
- Losses: 7
- By knockout: 0

Sher Mamazulunov (born May 17, 1995) is an Uzbek kickboxer, currently competing in the middleweight division of Fair Fight.

He is ranked as the fourth best middleweight in the world by Combat Press as of September 2022, and fourth best by Beyond Kickboxing as of October 2022.

== Kickboxing career ==
Mamazulonov fought Fotis Gkionis in the quarterfinals of the 2019 Tatneft 80 kg tournament, held on August 24, 2019. He won the fight by an extra round decision.

Mamazulunov was scheduled to face Islam Murtazaev Wu Lin Feng 2019: WLF China vs Russia on September 20, 2019, in an WLF-Orion cross-promotional event. Murtazaev won the fight by decision. The bout was later awarded "Fight of the Year" honors at the 2019 "The Orion Awards".

Mamazulunov faced Musa Sultaev in the semifinals of the 2019 Tatneft 80 kg tournament, held on October 4, 2019. Sultaev won the bout by an extra round decision.

Mamazulunov was scheduled to face Maksim Zaplitniy at WKF 5 Fighting Championship on February 24, 2020. He won the fight by unanimous decision.

Mamazulunov was scheduled to face Dmitry Valent at Fair Fight XIII on November 28, 2020. The fight went into an extra round, after which Mamazulunov was awarded the decision. The decision was seen as controversial, and was met with criticism online by a number of fans.

Mamazulunov was scheduled to fight Mikita Shostak in the co-main event of Fair Fight XIV on March 6, 2021. He won the fight by unanimous decision.

Mamazulunov was scheduled to face Evgeny Volchek at Fair Fight XV on August 28, 2021. He won the fight by split decision.

Mamazulunov was booked to face Sergey Ponomarev at Fair Fight XVI on February 12, 2022. After total domination of Sher Mamazulunov during the fight, decision was made to opponent favor. The decision resulted in massive dissatisfaction of the fans, and on February 17, the Fair Fight promotion announced that after considering the fight by independent judges, the fight was declared invalid and the judges serving the fight аrе suspended from Fair Fight tournaments.

== Titles and accomplishments ==
Professional

- Tatneft Cup
  - 2017 Tatneft Cup -80 kg Champion
  - 2018 Tatneft Cup -80 kg Champion
- Fair Fight
  - 2019 Fair Fight -77 kg Champion (1 defense)

Amateur

- World Association of Kickboxing Organizations
  - 2015 WAKO Russia Low kick Champion
  - 2016 WAKO World Championships Low kick Champion
  - 2016 WAKO Russia K-1 Champion
- World Pan Amateur Kick Boxing Association
  - 2016 WPKA Russia K-1 Champion

Awards

- 2018 Orion Awards Fighter of the Year
- 2019 Orion Awards Fight of the Year (vs. Islam Murtazaev)

== Fight record ==
Kickboxing record
36 Wins (5 (T)KOs), 7 Losses, 0 Draws
Date	Result	Opponent	Event	Location	Method	Round	Time
2022-02-12	NC	(Russia) Sergey Ponomarev	Fair Fight XVI	Yekaterinburg, Russia	No contest	5	3:00
For the Fair Fight -85kg title. Originally a split decision win for Ponomarev overturned after reclamation
2021-08-28	Win	(Belarus) Evgeny Volchek	Fair Fight XV	Yekaterinburg, Russia	Decision (Split)	3	3:00
2021-03-06	Win	(Belarus) Mikita Shostak	Fair Fight XIV	Yekaterinburg, Russia	Decision (Unanimous)	3	3:00
2020-11-28	Win	(Belarus) Dmitry Valent	Fair Fight XIII	Yekaterinburg, Russia	Ext.R Decision	4	3:00
2020-02-24	Win	(Moldova) Maxim Zaplîtni	WKF 5 Fighting Championship	Minsk, Belarus	Decision (Unanimous)	3	3:00
2019-10-04	Loss	(Russia) Musa Sultaev	Tatneft Cup, -80 kg Semi Final	Kazan, Russia	Ext.R Decision	4	3:00
2019-09-20	Loss	(Russia) Islam Murtazaev	Wu Lin Feng 2019: WLF China vs Russia	Moscow, Russia	Decision	3	3:00
2019-08-24	Win	(Greece) Fotis Gkionis	Tatneft Cup, -80 kg Quarter Final	Kazan, Russia	Ext.R Decision	4	3:00
2019-07-08	Win	(Belarus) Yuri Bessmertny	Fair Fight IX	Yekaterinburg, Russia	Decision (Unanimous)	5	3:00
Defends Fair Fight -77kg title.
2019-06-11	Win	(France) Bilal Bakhouche-Chareuf	Tatneft Cup, -80 kg 1/8 Final	Kazan, Russia	Ext.R Decision	4	3:00
2019-02-02	Win	(Brazil) Jonatan Oliveira	Fair Fight VII, Final	Yekaterinburg, Russia	Ext.R Decision	4	3:00
Wins Fair Fight -77kg title.
2019-02-02	Win	(Russia) Sharabutdin Magomedov	Fair Fight VII, Semi Final	Yekaterinburg, Russia	Ext.R Decision	4	3:00
2018-12-07	Win	(Serbia) Ljubo Jalovi	Tatneft Cup, -80 kg Tournament Final	Kazan, Russia	Ext.R Decision	4	3:00
Wins 2018 Tatneft Cup -80kg title.
2018-10-27	Win	(Spain) Victor Monfort	Tatneft Cup, -80 kg Tournament Semi Final	Kazan, Russia	Decision	3	3:00
2018-09-29	Win	(Brazil) Jonatan Oliveira	Fair Fight VI	Yekaterinburg, Russia	Decision (Unanimous)	3	3:00
2018-07-08	Win	(Slovakia) Vladimir Idranyi	Fair Fight	Yekaterinburg, Russia	Decision (Unanimous)	3	3:00
2018-08-24	Win	(Russia) Aleksandr Dmitrenko	Tatneft Cup, -80 kg Tournament Quarter Final	Kazan, Russia	Ext.R Decision	4	3:00
2018-05-31	Win	(Russia) Ruslan Kostin	ACB KB 15: Grand Prix Kitek	Moscow, Russia	TKO (Punches)	1	1:45
2017-12-14	Win	(Russia) Dmitry Menshikov	TATNEFT CUP, -80 kg Tournament Final	Kazan, Russia	Ext.R Decision	4	3:00
Wins 2017 Tatneft Cup -80kg title.
2017-10-27	Win	(Russia) Vladimir Degtyarev	TATNEFT CUP, -80 kg Tournament Semi Final	Kazan, Russia	Ext.R KO (Knee to the Body)	4	
2017-09-30	Loss	(Russia) Vasiliy Semenov	Fair Fight 4, Semi Final	Yekaterinburg, Russia	Decision	3	3:00
2017-07-19	Win	(Russia) Andrey Chekhonin	TATNEFT CUP, -80 kg Quarter Final	Kazan, Russia	Ext.R Decision	4	3:00
2017-06-21	Win	(Russia) Ivan Van Hong Tun	Fair Fight III	Yekaterinburg, Russia	KO (Knee to the Body)	3	
2017-03-22	Win	(Russia) Aleksandr Drobinin	TATNEFT CUP, -80 kg Tournament 1/8 Final	Kazan, Russia	Ext.R Decision	4	3:00
2017-01-	Loss	(Russia) Mamuka Usubyan	Fair Fight I	Yekaterinburg, Russia	Decision	3	3:00
2016-07-22	Loss	(Russia) Aleksandr Dmitrenko	Tatneft Cup, Quarter Finals	Kazan, Russia	Ext.R Decision	4	3:00
2016-05-25	Win	(Netherlands) Justin Dap	Tatneft Cup, 1/8 Finals	Kazan, Russia	Ext.R Decision	4	3:00
Legend: Win Loss Draw/No contest Notes

== See also ==
- List of male kickboxers
