= Dmitry Valent =

Belarusian kickboxer (born 1988)

- Born: April 3, 1988 (age 38); Minsk, Byelorussian SSR, Soviet Union
- Other names: Black Valet, TNT
- Nationality: Belarus
- Height: 1.86 m (6 ft 1 in)
- Weight: 75 kg (165 lb; 11.8 st)
- Division: Super Middleweight; Middleweight; Super Welterweight
- Style: Muay Thai
- Stance: Orthodox
- Fighting out of: Minsk, Belarus
- Team: Gym "Kick Fighter"
- Trainer: Evgeni Kotelnikov; Yuri Varaxa

Kickboxing record
- Total: 42
- Wins: 31
- By knockout: 12
- Losses: 11
- Last updated on: December 20, 2020

Dmitry "Black Valet" Valent (born 13 April 1988 in Minsk, Belarus) is a Belarusian Muay Thai middleweight and super middleweight kickboxer. He is the former WKN Middleweight Oriental rules and Muay Thai champion, former WMC Light Heavyweight champion, two-time WMC I-1 World Muaythai Grand Slam champion, and two-time Kunlun Fight 80 kg tournament runner-up.

Valent is one of Belarus's top fighters.

== Career and biography ==
=== Amateur career ===
Valent enjoyed a highly decorated amateur career before making his professional debut, although he continued to compete in amateur contests alongside professional ones between 2007 and 2012. He was the 2006 IFMA world silver medallist, as well as the 2009 and 2010 world gold medallist. In kickboxing, he was the 2007 WAKO World gold medallist and the 2010 European gold medallist.

=== Early career ===
Dmitry started training in Taekwondo at 13 years old before beginning Muay Thai aged 16. At Kick Fighter Gym" in his home town of Minsk he trained alongside world champions such as Andrei Kulebin and Dmitry Shakuta. He won a gold medal in the 67 kg junior category at the 2006 W.M.F. World Muaythai Championships in Bangkok, Thailand, aged 17, a gold medal at the W.A.K.O. World Championships 2007, then winning his first professional title, the World Kickboxing Network (W.K.N.) middleweight world title, in Kostroma, Russia, before adding the professional W.A.K.O. world title later that same year.

Dmitry kicked off 2008 by winning the W.K.N. European Grand Prix title, a four-man tournament fought under Muay Thai rules in Geneva, Switzerland. He then followed in the footsteps of stable mate Kulebin by winning the W.M.C. I-1 title – this one the Grand Slam 72 kg version – in Hong Kong. There was some disappointment at the end of the year, however, when Valent was knocked out of the Season 2 qualifier of The Contender Asia held in Russia by multiple world champion Artem Levin at the semi-final stage. The fact that the Contender Asia Season 2 show would never come to light did soften the blow somewhat. Valent had success on the amateur circuit as well, winning gold at the I.M.F.A. European championships held in Zgorzelec, Poland.

=== WKN and WMC World titles ===
The young Belarusian regained his W.M.C. I-1 title the following year, defeating South African Vuyisile Colossa by split decision in the final. He followed up this victory by defeating 2007 W.K.A. world champion Shane Campbell for the second time to win the Muay Thai version of the middleweight W.K.N. title. He carried on his form on the professional circuit onto the amateur circuit, winning a second amateur world championships by claiming gold at the I.F.M.A. event in Bangkok, Thailand.

In 2010, Valent continued his winning ways remaining the W.K.N. organizations middleweight world champion in Thai-boxing by defeating the talented Yohan Lidon at the start of 2010 and beating the Dutch-based Moroccan Tarek Slimani to claim the W.I.P.U. "King of the Ring" world title. He has suffered a few setbacks as well, losing to nemesis Artem Levin at the I.F.M.A. European Championships, and conceding a decision loss to legendary Aussie John Wayne Parr in an unsuccessful move down in weight to challenge for the W.K.N. super welterweight world title. He also won more gold medals at amateur level, winning the 75 kg category at the W.A.K.O. European and I.F.M.A. world championships respectively.

He lost a decision to Karim Ghajji at Nuit des Champions in Marseilles on November 24, 2012.

In a close fight, Valent lost to Simon Marcus by split decision at C3: King of Fighters in Chengdu, China on April 27, 2013.

=== Chinese circuit ===
He fought at Diamond Fight: Friendship in Chelyabinsk, Russia on December 13, 2013, defeating Bektas Emirhanoglu by third-round TKO. He went on to amass a 3–2 record, during which he won the IPCC light heavyweight world title with a decision win against Wehaj Kingboxing, but losing it to Simon Marcus during KLF 12. He then took part in the 2015 Kunlun Fight – 80 kg Tournament, defeating Arthit Hanchana in the semifinal, but losing to Artur Kyshenko in the final.

Valent participated in the 2016 80 kg tournament as well, qualifying to it with an extra round decision against Cédric Tousch. In the tournament itself, he won a majority decision against Hicham El Gaoui in the semifinal, but once against lost in the final, dropping a split decision to Alexander Stetsurenko.

=== European circuit ===
Returning to the European circuit, Valent fought Yurii Zubchuk at the DSF Kickboxing Challenge 14. He lost a majority decision. He snapped the losing skid with a second-round TKO of Serhii Snytiuk.

Valent made his ONE Championship debut against the two-time Tatneft Cup Champion Sher Mamazulunov at Road to ONE 4: Fair Fight 13. Mamazulunov won the fight by an extra round decision, although the fight results were controversial. The Fair Fight promotion analyzed the fight with an "independent judge", and agreed to make the rematch, to which Valent consented.

Valent faced Carlos Prates at Muaythai Night 6 on June 25, 2021. He lost the fight by decision.

== Titles and accomplishments ==
=== Professional ===
==== Muay Thai ====
- World Muaythai Council
  - 2013 WMC Light heavyweight World Champion
  - 2009 WMC I-1 World Muaythai Grand Slam -72 kg Champion
  - 2008 WMC I-1 World Muaythai Grand Slam -72 kg Champion
- World independent Promoters Union
  - 2010 W.I.P.U. King of the Ring Muay Thai World -75 kg Champion
- World Kickboxing Network
  - 2009 W.K.N. Muay Thai middleweight world champion -76.2 kg
    - Two successful title defenses
  - 2008 W.K.N. Muay Thai European Grand Prix -79 kg Champion
- World Association of Kickboxing Organizations
  - 2007 W.A.K.O. Pro Muaythai World -75 kg Champion

==== Kickboxing ====
- World Kickboxing Network
  - 2007 W.K.N. Oriental rules Middleweight (-76.4 kg) World Champion
- Grand Prix Russia Open
  - 2013 GPRO tournament champion
- Kunlun Fight
  - 2016 Kunlun Fight 80 kg Tournament Runner-up
  - 2015 Kunlun Fight 80 kg Tournament Runner-up

=== Amateur ===
- International Federation of Muaythai Amateur
  - 2019 I.F.M.A. European Muaythai Championships (gold) -86 kg
  - 2018 I.F.M.A. European Muaythai Championships (gold) -81 kg
  - 2017 I.F.M.A. World Muaythai Championships (gold) -81 kg
  - 2016 I.F.M.A. World Muaythai Championships (gold) -81 kg
  - 2015 I.F.M.A. Muaythai Royal World Cup in Bangkok, Thailand (gold) -81 kg
  - 2014 I.F.M.A. European Muaythai Championships (gold) -81 kg
  - 2013 I.F.M.A. European Muaythai Championships in Lisbon, Portugal (gold) -75 kg
  - 2010 I.F.M.A. World Muaythai Championships in Bangkok, Thailand (gold) -75 kg
  - 2009 I.F.M.A. World Muaythai Championships in Bangkok, Thailand (gold) -75 kg
  - 2008 I.F.M.A. European Muaythai Championships in Zgorzelec, Poland (gold) -75 kg
  - 2006 I.F.M.A. World Muaythai Championships in Bangkok, Thailand (bronze) -67 kg
- World Combat Games
  - 2013 World Combat Games Muaythai (silver) -81 kg
- World Association of Kickboxing Organizations
  - 2010 W.A.K.O. European Championships in Baku, Azerbaijan (gold) -75 kg (K-1 Rules)
  - 2007 W.A.K.O. World Championships in Belgrade, Serbia (gold) - 71 kg (K-1 Rules)
- World Muaythai Federation
  - 2006 W.M.F. World Muaythai Championships in Bangkok, Thailand (gold) -67 kg (Junior)

== Fight record ==
Professional Muay Thai & kickboxing record
31 wins (12 (T)KOs), 11 losses, 0 draws, 0 no contests
Date	Result	Opponent	Event	Location	Method	Round	Time
2021-06-25	Loss	(Brazil) Carlos Prates	Muaythai Night 6	Abu Dhabi, United Arab Emirates	Decision (split)	3	3:00
2020-11-28	Loss	(Uzbekistan) Sher Mamazulunov	Road to ONE 4: Fair Fight 13	Yekaterinburg, Russia	Decision (ext. round)	4	3:00
2018-12-02	Win	(Ukraine) Serhii Snytiuk	Akhmat Fight Show	Belarus	TKO (referee stoppage/left body hooks)	2	1:52
2018-04-13	Loss	(Ukraine) Yurii Zubchuk	DSF Kickboxing Challenge 14	Warsaw, Poland	Decision (majority)	3	3:00
2016-12-10	Loss	(Russia) Alexander Stetsurenko	Kunlun Fight 55 – 80 kg Tournament, Final	China	Decision (split)	3	3:00
Fight Was For Kunlun Fight 2016 (-80 kg) Tournament .
2016-12-10	Win	(Morocco) Hicham El Gaoui	Kunlun Fight 55 – 80 kg Tournament, Semi-finals	China	Decision (majority)	3	3:00
2016-09-10	Win	(France) Cédric Tousch	Kunlun Fight 51 - 80 kg 2016 Tournament Quarter-Finals	Fuzhou, China	Extra round decision	4	3:00
Qualified to Kunlun Fight 80 kg 2016 Tournament Final 4.
2015-12-19	Loss	(Ukraine) Artur Kyshenko	Kunlun Fight 35 – 80 kg Tournament, Final	Luoyang, China	KO	1	0:22
Fight was for the Kunlun Fight – 80 kg Tournament World Champion.
2015-12-19	Win	(Thailand) Arthit Hanchana	Kunlun Fight 35 – 80 kg Tournament, Semi-final	Luoyang, China	Decision (unanimous)	3	3:00
2015-07-19	Win	(China) Chen Yawei	Kunlun Fight 28	Nanjing, China	TKO	3	
2015-05-15	Loss	(Ukraine) Artur Kyshenko	Kunlun Fight 25	Bratislava, Slovakia	Decision (split)	3	3:00
2014-10-26	Loss	(Canada) Simon Marcus	Kunlun Fight 12	Jianshui, China	Decision	3	3:00
Losses IPCC light heavyweight world title & For the Kunlun Fight tournament, Combat Banchmek title.
2014-09-13	Win	(Thailand) Panom	Topking World Series	Minsk, Belarus	KO	2	0:46
2014-06-29	Win	(Thailand) Wehaj Kingboxing	Kunlun Fight 6	Chongqing, China	Decision (unanimous)	5	3:00
Wins IPCC light heavyweight world title.
2014-04-14	Win	(China) Nuerla	Kunlun Fight 1	Surin, Thailand	KO (left knee to the body)	1	2:10
2013-12-13	Win	(Turkey) Bektas Emirhanoglu	Diamon Fight: Friendship	Chelyabinsk, Russia	TKO	3	
Wins WMC light heavyweight world title.
2013-04-27	Loss	(Canada) Simon Marcus	C3: King of Fighters	Chengdu, China	Decision (split)	5	3:00
2013-04-06	Win	(Poland) Pawel Biszczak	Grand Prix Russia Open, Final	Moscow, Russia	Decision (unanimous)	3	3:00
Wins Grand Prix Russia Open tournament title.
2013-04-06	Win	(Poland) Wojciech Wierzbicki	Grand Prix Russia Open, Semi-finals	Moscow, Russia	KO (low kick)	1	1:00
2013-04-06	Win	(Moldova) Oleg Hohlov	Grand Prix Russia Open, Quarter-finals	Moscow, Russia	Decision (unanimous)	3	3:00
2012-11-24	Loss	(France) Karim Ghajji	Nuit des Champions	Marseille, France	Decision	5	3:00
2011-11-26	Win	(France) Samir Dourid	Big 8 WKN Tournament 2011	Minsk, Belarus	Decision	3	3:00
Retains W.K.N. Muay Thai middleweight world title -76.2 kg.
2010-09-12	Win	(Morocco) Tarek Slimani	W.K.N. World GP Big-8 Tournament '10, Title Fight	Minsk, Belarus	KO	3	
Wins vacant W.I.P.U. "King of the Ring" Muay Thai world title -76.4 kg.
2010-03-13	Loss	(Australia) John Wayne Parr	Domination 4	Bentley, Perth, Australia	Decision (unanimous)	5	3:00
Fight was for vacant W.K.N. Muay Thai super welterweight world title -72.6 kg.
2010-02-12	Win	(France) Yohan Lidon	UKC France MAX 2010, Title Fight	Dijon, France	Decision (unanimous)	5	3:00
Retains W.K.N. Muay Thai middleweight world title -76.2 kg.
2009-09-12	Win	(Canada) Shane Campbell	W.K.N. World GP Big-8 Tournament '09, Title Fight	Minsk, Belarus	Decision	5	3:00
Wins vacant W.K.N. Muay Thai middleweight world title -76.2 kg.
2009-10-22	Win	(South Africa) Vuyisile Colossa	W.M.C. I-1 World Grand Slam '09, Final	Hong Kong	Decision (split)	3	3:00
Wins W.M.C. I-1 World Muaythai Grand Slam 2009 tournament title -72 kg.
2009-10-22	Win	(Greece) Pavlos Kaponis	W.M.C. I-1 World Grand Slam '09, Semi-finals	Hong Kong	TKO	3	
2008-12-19	Loss	(Russia) Artem Levin	"The Contender Asia" Season 2 Russia Qualifier, Semi-finals	Chelyabinsk, Russia	Decision	3	3:00
2008-12-19	Win	(France) Abdallah Mabel	"The Contender Asia" Season 2 Russia Qualifier, Quarter-finals	Chelyabinsk, Russia	Decision	3	3:00
2008-10-27	Win	(Thailand) Singnoi Sitpholek	W.M.C. I-1 World Grand Slam '08, Final	Hong Kong	KO	2	
Wins W.M.C. I-1 World Muaythai Grand Slam 2008 tournament title -72 kg.
2008-10-27	Win	(Canada) Shane Campbell	W.M.C. I-1 World Grand Slam '08, Semi-finals	Hong Kong	Decision (unanimous)	3	3:00
2008-05-03	Win	(Switzerland) Farid M'laika	W.K.N. European Grand Prix, Final	Geneva, Switzerland	KO (spinning elbow)	2	
Wins W.K.N. European Grand Prix title -79 kg.
2008-05-03	Win	(Romania) Alexandru Nedelcu	W.K.N. European Grand Prix, Semi-finals	Geneva, Switzerland	Decision	3	3:00
2007-12-9	Win	(Italy) Fabio Siciliani	Wako-Pro World Title	Lecce, Italy	KO (knee)	2	
Wins vacant W.A.K.O. Pro Thai-boxing world title -75 kg.
2007-11-11	Win	(France) Samir Dourid	Kings of Muaythai - Russia	Kostroma, Russia	KO (left punch)	1	
Wins vacant W.K.N. oriental rules middleweight world title -76.4 kg.
Legend: Win Loss Draw/no contest Notes

Amateur Muay Thai & kickboxing record
Date	Result	Opponent	Event	Location	Method	Round	Time
2019-11-10	Win	(Sweden) Andreas Gardasevic	2019 IFMA European Championships, Final	Minsk, Belarus	Decision (30:26)	3	3:00
Wins 2019 IFMA European Championship -86kg Gold Medal.
2019-11-08	Win	(Russia) Mikhail Sartakov	2019 IFMA European Championships, Semi-final	Minsk, Belarus	Decision (30:27)	3	3:00
2018-07-07	Win	(Turkey) Ali Dogan	2018 IFMA European Championships, Final	Prague, Czech Republic	Decision (29:28)	3	3:00
Wins 2018 IFMA European Championship -81kg Gold Medal.
2018-07-04	Win	(Sweden) Marcus Liljedorff	2018 IFMA European Championships, Semi-final	Prague, Czech Republic	Decision (30:27)	3	3:00
2018-07-02	Win	(Germany) Umarjov Davlatov	2018 IFMA European Championships, Quarter-final	Prague, Czech Republic	Decision (29:28)	3	3:00
2017-05-12	Win	(Thailand) Saranon Glopman	2017 IFMA World Championships, Final	Minsk, Belarus	Decision (30:27)	3	3:00
Wins 2017 IFMA World Championship -81kg Gold Medal.
2017-05-10	Win	(Ukraine) Rostyslav Karpych	2017 IFMA World Championships, Semi-final	Minsk, Belarus	Decision (30:27)	3	3:00
2017-05-08	Win	(Russia) Sergey Veselkin	2017 IFMA World Championships, Quarter-final	Minsk, Belarus	Decision (30:27)	3	3:00
2016-10-29	Win	(Ukraine) Rostyslav Karpych	2016 IFMA European Championships, Final	Split, Croatia	Decision (30:27)	3	3:00
Wins 2016 IFMA European Championship -81kg Gold Medal.
2016-10-27	Win	(Poland) Rafal Korczak	2016 IFMA European Championships, Semi-final	Split, Croatia	Decision (30:27)	3	3:00
2016-10-25	Win	(Hungary) Busai Gergely	2016 IFMA European Championships, Quarter-final	Split, Croatia	RSC.B	1	
2016-05-	Win	(Russia) Surik Magakian	2016 IFMA World Championships, Final	Jönköping, Sweden	Decision	3	3:00
Wins 2016 IFMA World Championships -81kg Gold Medal.
2016-05-	Win	(France) Samuel Dbili	2016 IFMA World Championships, Semi-final	Jönköping, Sweden	Decision	3	3:00
2016-05-	Win		2016 IFMA World Championships, Quarter-final	Jönköping, Sweden			
2015-08-	Win	(Russia) Nadir Iskhakov	2015 IFMA World Championships, Final	Bangkok, Thailand	Decision	3	3:00
Wins 2015 IFMA World Championships -81kg Gold Medal.
2015-08-	Win	(Poland) Radoslaw Paczuski	2015 IFMA World Championships, Semi-final	Bangkok, Thailand	RSC.O	3	
2015-08-	Win	(Afghanistan) Shahram Delawar	2015 IFMA World Championships, Quarter-final	Bangkok, Thailand	RSC.B	3	
2015-03-	Win	(Morocco) Aziz El Felak	2015 IFMA-FISU Muaythai University World Cup, Final	Bangkok, Thailand	Decision	3	3:00
Wins 2015 IFMA-FISU Muaythai University World Cup -81kg Gold Medal.
2014-09-	Win	(Poland) Radosław Paczuski	2014 IFMA European Championships, Final	Kraków, Poland			
Wins 2014 IFMA European Championships -81kg Gold Medal.
2014-09-	Win	(Ukraine) Mykyta Zinchenko	2014 IFMA European Championships, Semi-finals	Kraków, Poland			
2014-09-	Win	(Sweden) Youssef Issa	2014 IFMA European Championships, Quarter-finals	Kraków, Poland			
2014-05-	Win	(Russia) Surik Magakian	2014 IFMA World Championships, Final	Langkawi, Malaysia			
Wins 2014 IFMA World Championships -81kg Gold Medal.
2014-05-	Win	(Sweden) Youssef Issa	2014 IFMA World Championships, Semi-finals	Langkawi, Malaysia			
2014-05-	Win	(Ukraine) Mykyta Zinchenko	2014 IFMA World Championships, Quarter-finals	Langkawi, Malaysia			
2013-10-23	Loss	(Russia) Artem Levin	2013 World Combat Games, Final	Bangkok, Thailand	Decision		
Wins 2013 World Combat Games Muay Thai -81kg Silver Medal.
2013-10-21	Win	(Australia) Kim Olaf Olsen	2013 World Combat Games, Semi-final	Bangkok, Thailand	Decision		
2012-09-11	Win	(Kazakhstan) Emil Umayev	2012 IFMA World Championships, Semi-finals	Saint Petersburg, Russia	Decision		
2012-09-10	Win	(Ukraine) Ivan Konoriev	2012 IFMA World Championships, Quarter-finals	Saint Petersburg, Russia	Decision		
2012-09-08	Win	(Luxembourg) Kevin Victoa	2012 IFMA World Championships, First Round	Saint Petersburg, Russia			
2012-04-22	Win	(Czech Republic) Matouš Kohout	2012 I.F.M.A. European Championships	Antalya, Turkey			
2011-09-23	Loss	(Ukraine) Vitaliy Nikiforov	2011 IFMA World Championships, Quarter-finals	Tashkent, Uzbekistan	Decision	4	2:00
2010-12-05	Win	(Russia) Valentin Semenov	I.F.M.A. World Muaythai Championships '10, Final -75 kg	Bangkok, Thailand			
Wins I.F.M.A. World Muaythai Championships '10 Gold Medal -75 kg.
2010-10-24	Win	(Poland) Wojciech Kosowski	W.A.K.O. European Championships '10 Baku, K-1 Finals -75 kg	Baku, Azerbaijan	Decision	3	2:00
Wins W.A.K.O. Amateur European Championships Baku '10 K-1 Gold Medal -71 kg. Had walkthrough to final as his semi final opponent was unable to fight.
2010-10-?	Win	(North Macedonia) Ile Risteski	W.A.K.O. European Championships '10 Baku, K-1 Quarter-finals -75 kg	Baku, Azerbaijan	KO	1	
2010-05-27	Loss	(Russia) Artem Levin	I.F.M.A. European Championships '10, Quarter-finals	Velletri, Italy	Decision (5–0)	4	2:00
2010-05-26	Win	(Turkey) Şahin	I.F.M.A. European Championships '10, 1st round	Velletri, Italy			
2009-12-05	Win	(Ukraine) Vasyl Tereshonok	I.F.M.A. World Muaythai Championships '09, Final -75 kg	Bangkok, Thailand	Decision	4	2:00
Wins I.F.M.A. World Muaythai Championships '09 Gold Medal -75 kg.
2009-12-02	Win	(Croatia) Emil Zoraj	IFMA 2009 World Muaythai Championships 1/2 finals (75 kg)	Bangkok, Thailand	Decision	4	2:00
2007-09-30	Win	(Russia) Rizvan Isaev	W.A.K.O. World Championships 2007 Belgrade, K-1 Final -71 kg	Belgrade, Serbia			
Wins W.A.K.O. Amateur World Championships Belgrade '07 K-1 Gold Medal -71 kg.
2007-09-?	Win	(France) Djime Coulibaly	W.A.K.O. World Championships 2007 Belgrade, K-1 Semi-finals -71 kg	Belgrade, Serbia			
2007-09-?	Win	(Austria) Osami Adil	W.A.K.O. World Championships 2007 Belgrade, K-1 Quarter-finals -71 kg	Belgrade, Serbia			
2007-09-?	Win	(Croatia) Branko Mikulić	W.A.K.O. World Championships 2007 Belgrade, K-1 1st round -71 kg	Belgrade, Serbia			
2006-06-06	Loss	(France) Ameur Redwan	I.F.M.A. World Muaythai Championships '06, Semi-finals -67 kg	Bangkok, Thailand			
Wins I.F.M.A. World Muaythai Championships '06 Bronze Medal -75 kg.
2006-06-03	Win	(Kazakhstan) Askarbek Shakiyev	I.F.M.A. World Muaythai Championships '06, Quarter-finals -67 kg	Bangkok, Thailand			
2006-03-26	Win	(Turkey) Mehmet Dogan	W.M.F. World Muaythai Championships '06, Junior Final -67 kg	Bangkok, Thailand			
Wins W.M.F. World Muaythai Championships '06 Junior Gold Medal -67 kg.
Legend: Win Loss Draw/no contest Notes

== See also ==
- List of male kickboxers
