= Mostafa Mosadegh =

Swedish-Iranin professional kickboxer

- Native name: مصطفی مصدق
- Nationality: Swedish; Iranian

Mostafa Mosadegh (Persian: مصطفی مصدق) is a Swedish-Iranian professional kickboxer. In 2012, he won the IKF World Title in Thai Boxing Championships, held in Phuket, Thailand.

== See also ==
- List of male kickboxers
