= Aleksandar Petrov =

Bulgarian kickboxer

- Born: 23 January 1991 (age 35); Bulgaria
- Native name: Александър Петров
- Other names: Alexander Petrov
- Height: 1.88 m (6 ft 2 in)
- Weight: 85 kg (187 lb; 13.4 st)
- Style: Kickboxing
- Stance: Orthodox
- Fighting out of: Varna, Bulgaria
- Trainer: Delyan Slavov

Kickboxing record
- Total: 41
- Wins: 35
- By knockout: 17
- Losses: 6

Aleksandar Petrov is a Bulgarian kickboxer. He has competed Glory and Colosseum Tournament.

As of November 2023 he was the No. 10 ranked middleweight kickboxer in the world by Beyond Kickboxing.

== Career ==
=== Early career ===
On 24 June 2016 Petrov challenged Cédric Tousch for his WAKO Pro K-1 World Light Heavyweight title at the Monte-Carlo Fighting Masters. He lost the fight by decision.

On 2 August 2017, Petrov faced Jordan Yankov for the Max Fight Middleweight title. He won the fight by unanimous decision.

On 13 October 2017, Petrov faced Bojan Gajic at the B1B Fight Night in Varna, Bulgaria for the vacant WKN K-1 European Light Heavyweight title. He won by knockout in the third round with a high kick. For this victory Petrov was awarded Sportsman of the month of the city of Varna.

On 18 May 2018, Petrov travelled to France to challenge Elijah Bokeli for the vacant WAKO Pro K-1 World Light Heavyweight title. He lost the fight by decision.

=== Colosseum Tournament ===
On 17 September 2019, Petrov took part in a 4-man tournament at Colosseum Tournament 8 in Bucharest, Romania for the inaugural 86 kg title of the promotion. In Semi-finals he defeated Dragoș Imbrea by extension round decision before losing in the final to Cosmin Ionescu also by extension round decision.

Petrov faced Mike Sprangh on 9 February 2019 at the SFC 7 Avatars event in Sofia, Bulgaria. He won by unanimous decision after five rounds and took home the K-1 -84 kg title of the organization.

Petrov was scheduled to defend his Max Fight Middleweight (−82.5 kg) title against Chico Kwasi at Max Fight 42 on 3 May 2018. He won the fight by unanimous decision.

Petrov was scheduled to face Maxim Zaplitnî on 2 July 2021, at Max Fight 45 for the 84 kg title of the promotion in a bout competed with open finger gloves. He won by unanimous decision after five rounds. Petrov and Zaplitnî had an immediate rematch with the same title at stake on 12 November 2021, at Max Fight 47. Petrov won by technical knockout with low kicks in the fourth round.

=== Senshi ===
Petrov made his debut for the SENSHI promotion on 5 December 2021, at SENSHI 10 against Filip Sekulovic. He won the fight by knockout in the second round with low kicks.

For his second fight Petrov faced Boban Ilioski at SENSHI 11 on 26 February 2022. He won the bout by doctor stoppage in the third round.

Petrov faced Ruben Lee at SENSHI 12 on 9 July 2022. He won the fight by unanimous decision.

For his fifth fight on the SENSHI promotion Petrov had the opportunity to fight for the vacant European 85 kg title against Ali El Ameri at SENSHI 17 on 8 July 2023. He won the fight and the title by extension round split decision.

=== Glory ===
Petrov signed with the Glory organization in August 2023. He made his debut for the promotion on 7 October 2023, at Glory 89 in Varna, Bulgaria against Karim Mabrouk. He won the fight by unanimous decision.

== Titles and accomplishments ==
=== Professional ===
- World Kickboxing Network
  - 2017 WKN K-1 European Light Heavyweight (82.5 kg) Champion
- MAX Fight
  - 2017 MAX Fight −82.5 kg Champion (one defense)
  - 2021 MAX Fight −84 kg Champion (one defense)
- SENSHI
  - 2023 SENSHI European −85 kg Champion

=== Amateur ===
- World Association of Kickboxing Organizations
  - 2015 WAKO World Championships K-1 -81 kg (gold)
  - 2017 WAKO World Championships K-1 -81 kg (gold)
- World Games
  - 2017 World Games Full-Contact Kickboxing −81 kg (silver)

== Kickboxing record ==
Professional Kickboxing Record
Date	Result	Opponent	Event	Location	Method	Round	Time
2023-10-07	Win	(Austria) Karim Mabrouk	Glory 89	Burgas, Bulgaria	Decision (Unanimous)	3	3:00
2023-07-08	Win	(Morocco) Ali El Ameri	SENSHI 17	Varna, Bulgaria	Ext.R Decision (Split)	4	3:00
Wins the vacant SENSHI European −85 kg title.
2023-05-13	Win	(France) Frangis Goma	SENSHI 16	Varna, Bulgaria	Ext.R Decision (Unanimous)	4	3:00
2023-04-06	Win	(France) Ulrich Tiebe	Max Fight 53	Sofia, Bulgaria	Decision (Unanimous)	3	3:00
2022-07-09	Win	(Spain) Ruben Lee	SENSHI 12	Bulgaria	Decision (Unanimous)	3	3:00
2022-02-26	Win	(North Macedonia) Boban Ilioski	SENSHI 11	Varna, Bulgaria	TKO (Doctor stoppage)	3	
2021-12-05	Win	(Montenegro) Filip Sekulovic	SENSHI 10	Varna, Bulgaria	KO (Low kick)	2	1:25
2021-11-12	Win	(Moldova) Maxim Zaplitnî	Max Fight 47	Sofia, Bulgaria	KO (Low kicks)	4	2:00
Defends MAX Fight −84kg title.
2021-07-02	Win	(Moldova) Maxim Zaplitnî	Max Fight 45	Sunny Beach, Bulgaria	Decision (Unanimous)	5	3:00
Wins the inaugural MAX Fight −84kg title.
2019-08-02	Win	(Moldova) Nikolae Garbuz	Max Fight 44	Bulgaria	KO (Left hook to the body)	2	2:25
2019-06-28	Win	(Brazil) Fabio Alberto	Enfusion 86	Belgrade, Serbia	Decision	3	3:00
2019-05-03	Win	(Netherlands) Chico Kwasi	Max Fight 42	Sofia, Bulgaria	Decision (Unanimous)	5	3:00
Defends MAX Fight −82.5 kg title.
2019-03-29	Win	(Romania) Radu Medeleanu	Colosseum Tournament 11	Bucharest, Romania	Decision (Unanimous)	3	3:00
2019-02-09	Win	(Netherlands) Mike Sprangh	SFC 7 Avatars	Sofia, Bulgaria	Decision	5	3:00
Wins the SFC K-1 -84kg title.
2018-09-17	Loss	(Romania) Cosmin Ionescu	Colosseum Tournament 8, Final	Bucharest, Romania	Ext.R Decision	4	3:00
For the inaugural Colosseum Tournament World −86kg title.
2018-09-17	Win	(Romania) Dragoș Imbrea	Colosseum Tournament 8, Semi-final	Bucharest, Romania	Ext.R Decision	4	3:00
2018-08-02	Win	(Moldova) Vasilij Kirica	Max Fight 41	Sveti Vlas, Bulgaria	KO (Left hook to the body)	2	2:10
2018-05-18	Loss	(France) Elijah Bokeli	Boxing Event	Sarcelles, France	Decision	5	3:00
For the vacant WAKO Pro K-1 World Light Heavyweight (−81.5 kg) title.
2017-10-13	Win	(Serbia) Bojan Gajic	B1B Fight Night	Varna, Bulgaria	TKO (High kick)	3	
Wins WKN K-1 European Light Heavyweight (82.5 kg) title.
2017-08-02	Win	(Bulgaria) Jordan Yankov	Max Fight 40	Sveti Vlas, Bulgaria	Decision (Unanimous)	5	3:00
Wins the MAX Fight −82.5 kg title.
2016-06-24	Loss	(France) Cédric Tousch	Monte-Carlo Fighting Masters	Monte Carlo, Monaco	Decision	5	3:00
For the WAKO Pro K-1 World Light Heavyweight (−81.5 kg) title.
2016-05-27	Win	(Bulgaria) Kosta Bochkarowski	Ultimate Pro Fight 5	Varna, Bulgaria	TKO (retirement)	2	
2013-04-27	Win	(Russia) Ruslan Turlapov	Slavic Battle	Voronezh, Russia	Decision	3	3:00
Legend: Win Loss Draw/No contest Notes

Amateur Kickboxing Record
Date	Result	Opponent	Event	Location	Method	Round	Time
2017-11-	Win	(Ukraine) Iurii Zubchuk	2017 WAKO World Championships, Final	Budapest, Hungary	Decision (2:1)	3	2:00
Won the 2017 WAKO World Championships K-1 -81kg Gold Medal.
2017-11-	Win	(Poland) Bartosz Dolbien	2017 WAKO World Championships, Semi-final	Budapest, Hungary	Decision (2:1)	3	2:00
2017-11-	Win	(Germany) Daniel Zeuner	2017 WAKO World Championships, Quarter Final	Budapest, Hungary	Decision (3:0)	3	2:00
2017-11-	Win	(Turkey) Serdar Celik	2017 WAKO World Championships, 1/8 Final	Budapest, Hungary	Decision (3:0)	3	2:00
2017-07-28	Loss	(Serbia) Aleksandar Menković	2017 World Games, Final	Wrocław, Poland	Forfeit		
Wins 2017 World Games Full-Contact Kickboxing −81kg Silver Medal.
2017-07-27	Win	(United States) Omari Boyd	2017 World Games, Semi-finals	Wrocław, Poland	Decision (3:0)	3	2:00
2017-07-26	Win	(Russia) Aleksandr Dmitrenko	2017 World Games, Quarter Finals	Wrocław, Poland	Decision (3:0)	3	2:00
2016-10-	Loss	(Belarus) Dzmitry Baranau	2016 WAKO European Championships, Quarterfinals	Maribor, Slovenia	Decision (3:0)	3	2:00
2015-10-31	Win	(Poland) Arkadiusz Kaszuba	2015 WAKO World Championships, Final	Belgrade, Serbia	Decision (3:0)	3	2:00
Won the 2015 WAKO World Championships K-1 -81kg Gold Medal.
2015-10-30	Win	(Russia) Aleksandr Dmitrenko	2015 WAKO World Championships, Semi-finals	Belgrade, Serbia	Decision (Split)	3	2:00
2015-10-29	Win	(Turkey) Safak Grogulu	2015 WAKO World Championships, Quarter Finals	Belgrade, Serbia	Decision (3:0)	3	2:00
2015-10-28	Win	(Belarus) Dzmitry Baranau	2015 WAKO World Championships, First Round	Belgrade, Serbia	Decision (3:0)	3	2:00
2012-10-	Loss	(Hungary) Gergely Busai	2012 WAKO European Championships, Quarterfinals	Ankara, Turkey	Decision (2:1)	3	2:00
2012-10-	Win	(Serbia) Jasmin Musa	2012 WAKO European Championships, First Round	Ankara, Turkey	Decision (3:0)	3	2:00
Legend: Win Loss Draw/No contest Notes

== See also ==
- List of male kickboxers
