= Sergey Veselkin =

Russian male kickboxer

Sergey Mikhailovich Veselkin
- Born: Сергей Михайлович Веселкин; 11 May 1994 (age 32); Moscow, Russia
- Nationality: Russian
- Height: 1.88 m (6 ft 2 in)
- Weight: 120 kg (265 lb; 18 st 13 lb)
- Style: Kickboxing
- Fighting out of: Moscow, Russia
- Team: Combat gym
- Years active: 2012–present

Kickboxing record
- Total: 19
- Wins: 16
- By knockout: 7
- Losses: 3
- By knockout: 1

Sergey Mikhailovich Veselkin (born May 11, 1994) is a Russian kickboxer. He was ranked as the #10 middleweight kickboxer in the world by Combat Press between March and June 2022.

== Kickboxing career ==
Veselkin faced Gadzhimurad Abdurakhmanov at Fair Fight VII on February 9, 2019. He won the fight by unanimous decision, after an extra round was fought. Veselkin next faced Mikhail Adelin at Fair Fight VIII on April 21, 2019. He won the fight by unanimous decision.

Veselkin faced the former SUPERKOMBAT light heavyweight champion César Almeida at Fair Fight IX on July 8, 2019. He won the fight by unanimous decision, after an extra round was fought.

Veselkin faced Andrei Chekhonin at Wu Lin Feng 2019: WLF China vs Russia on September 20, 2019. He lost the fight by decision.

Veselkin faced Gadgi Medjidov, who stepped in on two days notice, at Fair Fight XI on March 21, 2021. Despite coming into the bout as the favorite, Veselkin lost the fight by a third-round knockout.

Veselkin was booked to face Andrey Lobanov at Fair Fight XV on August 28, 2021, following a fifteen-month absence from the sport. He won the fight by unanimous decision, after an extra round was contested.

Veselkin faced Andrey Lobanov for the WMC Russia -86 kg title at GPRO 37 on April 14, 2022. He won the fight by a fourth-round technical knockout.

== Titles and accomplishments ==
Professional

- World Muaythai Council
  - 2022 WMC Russia Cruiserweight (-86 kg) Championship

Amateur

- Russian Muaythai Federation
  - 2016 National Muaythai Championship (-81 kg) (gold)
  - 2017 National Muaythai Championship (-81 kg) (silver)
- International Federation of Muaythai Associations
  - 2016 IFMA Youth World Championships (-81 kg) (gold)
  - 2017 IFMA World Championships B-class (-81 kg) (gold)

== Muay Thai and kickboxing record ==
Professional kickboxing record
16 wins (7 (T)KOs), 3 losses, 0 draws, 0 no contests
| Date | Result | Opponent | Event | Location | Method | Round | Time |
| 2024-11-18 | Win | (Belarus) Petr Romankevich | RCC 20 | Yekaterinburg, Russia | KO | 1 | |
| 2023-12-15 | Win | (Uzbekistan) Khusan Baratov | RCC 17 | Yekaterinburg, Russia | TKO (retirement) | 2 | 3:00 |
| 2023-09-23 | Win | (Kyrgyzstan) Akhmed Baguzhaev | RCC Intro 28 | Yekaterinburg, Russia | TKO (3 knockdowns) | 1 | |
| 2023-07-28 | Win | (Russia) Gadzhi Abdulkadirov | RCC 16 | Yekaterinburg, Russia | TKO (Liver punch) | 2 | 2:44 |
| 2022-04-14 | Win | (Russia) Andrey Lobanov | GPRO 37 | Yekaterinburg, Russia | TKO (doctor stoppage) | 4 | 2:28 |
Wins WMC Russia -86kg title.
| 2021-08-28 | Win | (Russia) Andrey Lobanov | Fair Fight XV | Yekaterinburg, Russia | Ext. R. dec. (unanimous) | 4 | 3:00 |
| 2020-03-21 | Loss | (Russia) Gadzhi Medzhidov | Fair Fight XI | Yekaterinburg, Russia | KO (right cross) | 3 | 0:27 |
| 2019-09-20 | Loss | (Russia) Andrei Chekhonin | Wu Lin Feng 2019: WLF China vs Russia | Moscow, Russia | Decision | 3 | 3:00 |
| 2019-07-08 | Win | (Brazil) César Almeida | Fair Fight IX | Yekaterinburg, Russia | Ext. R. dec. (unanimous) | 4 | 3:00 |
| 2019-04-21 | Win | (Russia) Mikhail Adelin | Fair Fight VIII | Yekaterinburg, Russia | Decision (unanimous) | 3 | 3:00 |
| 2019-07-21 | Win | (Russia) Vadim Dimitriev | Muay Thai Night 5 | Moscow, Russia | TKO (referee stoppage) | 3 | 1:07 |
| 2019-02-09 | Win | (Russia) Gadzhimurad Abdurakhmanov | Fair Fight VII | Yekaterinburg, Russia | Ext. R. dec. (unanimous) | 4 | 3:00 |
| 2017-09-24 | Win | (Ukraine) Stas Stadnichenko | Russian Challenge 4 | Yekaterinburg, Russia | Ext. R. dec. (unanimous) | 4 | 3:00 |
| 2017-03-24 | Loss | (China) Ou An | Wu Fights | China | Decision | 5 | 3:00 |
| 2017-03-19 | Win | (Russia) Ruslan Kostin | Russian Challenge 3 | Yekaterinburg, Russia | KO (right cross) | 1 | 1:48 |
| 2012-06-10 | Win | (Russia) Konstantin Vinogradov | | Yekaterinburg, Russia | Decision (unanimous) | 3 | 3:00 |
Legend: Win Loss Draw/no contest Notes

Amateur Muay Thai kickboxing record
| Date | Result | Opponent | Event | Location | Method | Round | Time |
|---|---|---|---|---|---|---|---|
| 2017-10- | Win | (Belarus) Karen Tumasian | 2017 IFMA European Championships, Final | Minsk, Belarus | RSC.I | 2 | |
Wins 2017 IFMA European Championships B-class -81kg Gold Medal.
| 2017-05-08 | Loss | (Belarus) Dmitry Valent | 2017 IFMA World Championships, Quarter Final | Minsk, Belarus | Decision (30:27) | 3 | 3:00 |
Legend: Win Loss Draw/no contest Notes

== Karate Combat record ==
| Res. | Record | Opponent | Method | Event | Date | Round | Time | Location | Notes |
|---|---|---|---|---|---|---|---|---|---|
| Loss | 0-1 | Bruno Chaves | KO (right overhand) | Karate Combat 54 | May 2, 2025 | 1 | 0:22 | Dubai, United Arab Emirates | |

== See also ==
- List of male kickboxers
