= Aleksandr Dmitrenko =

Russian kickboxer

- Born: Aleksandr Vladimirovich Dmitrenko; January 11, 1988 (age 38); Tolyatti, Russia
- Native name: Александр Владимирович Дмитренко
- Nationality: Russian
- Height: 1.82 m (5 ft 11 1/2 in)
- Weight: 81 kg (179 lb; 12.8 st)
- Style: Kickboxing
- Stance: Orthodox
- Fighting out of: Moscow, Russia
- Team: Fighting Gloves; Tuff Guy Team
- Trainer: Oleg Viktorovich Melnichenko

Kickboxing record
- Total: 30
- Wins: 20
- By knockout: 4
- Losses: 8
- By knockout: 1
- Draws: 1
- No contests: 1

Aleksandr Dmitrenko is a Russian kickboxer.

As of December 2022 he was the #10 ranked middleweight kickboxer in the world by Beyond Kick.

== Kickboxing career ==
Dmitrenko started training in kickboxing at the age of 10 years old inspired by action movies.

On April 26, 2014, Dmitrenko travelled to São Paulo, Brazil to face Alex Pereira at WGP Kickboxing 19. He lost the fight by unanimous decision.

On March 13, 2015, Dmitrenko defeated Nahid Asadov by decision at the Heydar Aliev Cup.

In 2015 Dmitrenko took part in the Tatneft Cup in the -80 kg division. On April 29, 2015, he defeated Masoud Rahimi by extension round decision in the quarterfinals fight.

On September 4, 2015, Dmitrenko faced Timur Aylyarov in the Tatneft Cup final. He lost by extension round decision.

On May 28, 2016, Dmitrenko challenged Alexander Dorokhin for the Russian -81 kg K-1 title at Strong Russia event. He won the fight by unanimous decision after five round to take the belt.

Dmitrenko took part in the 2016 Tatneft Cup once again, he faced Mohammed El Boulahiati in the first round of the tournament, winning by decision after three rounds. On July 22, 2016, Dmitrenko defeated Sher Mamazulunov by extension round decision in the quarterfinal of the Tatneft Cup.

Dmitrenko took part in the 2019 Tatneft Cup, he lost in the first round of the tournament by Mbamba Cauwenbergh who defeated him by decision after scoring a knockdown on May 26, 2019.

Dmitrenko suffered his third defeat in a row when he faced Ilya Sokolov on February 8, 2021, losing the fight by decision.

On December 10, 2021, Dmitrenko took part in a 4-man tournament at Battle of Champions 13 where every participant represented a different striking discipline. As the kickboxing representative he defeated Salimsoltan Aminov by decision in semifinal and Tatneft Cup winner Musa Sultaev in the final also by decision.

On January 22, 2022, Dmiternko defeated Yuri Zaatov by unanimous decision at Top Strike event in Moscow, Russia.

== Titles and accomplishments ==
=== Professional ===
- Tatneft Cup
  - 2015 Tatneft Cup -80 kg Runner-up
- Russia Professional Kickboxing Federation
  - 2016 Russia K-1 -81 kg Champion

=== Amateur ===
- World Association of Kickboxing Organizations
  - 4x Russia Championships K-1 Winner (2014, 2015, 2016, 2018)
  - 2024 USA Championships K-1 Winner
  - 2006 WAKO World Championship Junior Low Kick -75 kg (silver)
  - 2014 WAKO European Championships K-1 -86 kg (silver)
  - 2015 WAKO World Championships K-1 -81 kg (bronze)
  - 2016 WAKO European Championships K-1 -81 kg (silver)
  - 2018 WAKO K-1 European Cup -81 kg (silver)
  - 2021 WAKO World Championships K-1 -81 kg (gold)
- World Combat Games
  - 2013 World Combat Games Full Contact -91 kg (gold)

== Fight record ==
Kickboxing record
20 Wins (4 (T)KOs), 8 Losses, 1 Draw, 1 No Contest
Date	Result	Opponent	Event	Location	Method	Round	Time
2023-03-25	NC	(Belarus) Georgiy Klim	Ural FC 2	Kazan, Russia	No Contest (low blow)	1	2:00
2022-12-23	Loss	(Russia) Magomed Magomedov	FKR PRO 2	Moscow, Russia	Decision	3	3:00
2022-07-22	Win	(Russia) Tamerlan Khasiev	Rage Arena 3	Moscow, Russia	Decision	3	3:00
2022-01-28	Win	(Russia) Yuri Zaatov	Triple Strike	Moscow, Russia	Decision (Unanimous)	3	3:00
2021-12-10	Win	(Russia) Musa Sultaev	Battle of Champions 13, Final	Moscow, Russia	Decision	3	2:00
2021-12-10	Win	(Russia) Salimsoltan Aminov	Battle of Champions 13, Semi Final	Moscow, Russia	Decision	3	2:00
2021-02-08	Loss	(Russia) Ilya Sokolov	Martial Arts Festival	Nizhnekamsk, Russia	Decision	3	3:00
2019-05-26	Loss	(Belgium) Mbamba Cauwenbergh	Tatneft Cup, -80 kg First Round	Kazan, Russia	Decision	3	3:00
2018-08-24	Loss	(Uzbekistan) Sher Mamazulunov	Tatneft Cup, -80 kg Tournament Quarter Final	Kazan, Russia	Ext.R Decision	4	3:00
2018-04-27	Win	(Italy) Emanuele Lulaj	2016 Tatneft Cup, -80 kg First Round	Kazan, Russia	TKO (Left hook)	3	
2018-01-13	Draw	(Belarus) Dmitry Baranov	Royal Fight 2	Minsk, Belarus	Decision	3	3:00
2017-02-25	Win	(Belgium) Mbamba Cauwenbergh	EM Legend 16	Xichang, Russia	Decision (Unanimous)	3	3:00
2017-01-28	Win	(Russia)		Samara, Russia	Decision	3	3:00
2016-09-22	Loss	(Russia) Nikolay Lushin	2016 Tatneft Cup, -80 kg Semi Finals	Kazan, Russia	Decision	3	3:00
2016-07-22	Win	(Uzbekistan) Sher Mamazulunov	2016 Tatneft Cup, -80 kg Quarter Finals	Kazan, Russia	Ext.R Decision	4	3:00
2016-05-28	Win	(Russia) Alexander Dorokhin	Strong Russia	Kazan, Russia	Decision (Unanimous)	5	3:00
Wins Russia K-1 -80kg title.
2016-02-12	Win	(Morocco) Mohammed El Boulahiati	2016 Tatneft Cup, -80 kg First Round	Kazan, Russia	Decision	3	3:00
2015-12-27	Win	(Bulgaria) Yordan Yankov	Hurricane Battle	Sochi, Russia	Decision	3	3:00
2015-09-04	Loss	(Russia) Timur Aylyarov	2015 Tatneft Cup, -80 kg Final	Kazan, Russia	Ext.R Decision	4	3:00
For the 2015 Tatneft Cup -80kg title.
2015-08-04	Win	(Belgium) Zakaria Baitar	2015 Tatneft Cup, -80 kg Semi Finals	Kazan, Russia	Ext.R Decision	4	3:00
2015-04-29	Win	(Netherlands) Masoud Rahimi	2015 Tatneft Cup, -80 kg Quarter Finals	Kazan, Russia	Ext.R Decision	4	3:00
2015-03-13	Win	(Azerbaijan) Nahid Asadov	WAKO Pro - Heydar Aliev Cup	Saint Petersburg, Russia	Decision (Split)	3	3:00
2015-01-24	Win	(Netherlands) Marino Schouten	2015 Tatneft Cup, -80 kg First Round	Kazan, Russia	KO (Right overhand)	2	
2014-11-29	Loss	(Brazil) César Almeida	WGP Kickboxing 23	Brazil	Decision	3	3:00
2014-04-26	Loss	(Brazil) Alex Pereira	WGP Kickboxing 19: SUPER 4	São Paulo, Brazil	Decision (Unanimous)	3	3:00
2012-03-11	Loss	(Belarus) Andrey Gerasimchuk	Best Fighter - Russia vs. Belarus	Samara, Russia	KO	1	
Legend: Win Loss Draw/No contest Notes

Amateur Kickboxing record
Date	Result	Opponent	Event	Location	Method	Round	Time
2021-10-	Win	(Turkey) Yunus Emre Batan	2021 WAKO World Championships, Final	Jesolo, Italy	Decision (3:0)	3	3:00
Won the 2021 WAKO World Championships K-1 -81kg Gold Medal.
2021-10-	Win	(Serbia) Nikola Todorović	2021 WAKO World Championships, Semi Finals	Jesolo, Italy	Decision (3:0)	3	3:00
2021-10-	Win	(Poland) Dominik Kaleta	2021 WAKO World Championships, Quarter Finals	Jesolo, Italy	Decision (3:0)	3	3:00
2021-10-	Win	(Lithuania) Raimondas Avlasevicius	2021 WAKO World Championships, Second Round	Jesolo, Italy	Decision (3:0)	3	3:00
2021-10-	Win	(Switzerland) Kevin Buser	2021 WAKO World Championships, First Round	Jesolo, Italy	Decision (3:0)	3	3:00
2019-09-27	Loss	(Poland) Bartosz Dolbien	WAKO K-1 WGP 2019, Second Round	Prague, Czech Republic	Decision (3:0)	3	2:00
2019-09-27	Win	(Ukraine) Pavlo Mykhailytsia	WAKO K-1 WGP 2019, First Round	Prague, Czech Republic	Decision (3:0)	3	2:00
2018-09-09	Loss	(Ukraine) Iurii Zubchuk	WAKO K-1 European Cup 2018, Final	Prague, Czech Republic	Decision (2:1)	3	2:00
Won the 2018 WAKO K-1 European Cup -81kg Silver Medal.
2018-09-08	Win	(Slovakia) Juraj Tutura	WAKO K-1 European Cup 2018, Semi Finals	Prague, Czech Republic	Decision (3:0)	3	2:00
2018-09-07	Win	(Poland) Bartosz Dolbien	WAKO K-1 European Cup 2018, Quarter Finals	Prague, Czech Republic	Decision (2:1)	3	2:00
2018-09-06	Win	(Bulgaria) Csaba-Benjamin Toth	WAKO K-1 European Cup 2018, First Round	Prague, Czech Republic	Decision (3:0)	3	2:00
2017-07-26	Loss	(Bulgaria) Aleksandar Petrov	2017 World Games, Quarter Finals	Wrocław, Poland	Decision (3:0)	3	2:00
2016-10-29	Loss	(Serbia) Aleksandar Menkovic	2016 WAKO European Championships, Final	Maribor, Slovenia	Decision (3:0)	3	2:00
Won the 2016 WAKO European Championships K-1 -81kg Silver Medal.
2016-10-28	Win	(Belarus) Dzmitry Barnau	2016 WAKO European Championships, Semi Final	Maribor, Slovenia			
2016-10-27	Win	(Turkey) Safak Gorgulu	2016 WAKO European Championships, Quarter Final	Maribor, Slovenia			
2015-10-30	Loss	(Bulgaria) Aleksandar Petrov	2015 WAKO World Championships, Semi Finals	Belgrade, Serbia	Decision (2:1)	3	2:00
Won the 2015 WAKO World Championships K-1 -81kg Bronze Medal.
2015-10-29	Win	(Morocco) Aiz El Felak	2015 WAKO World Championships, Quarter Finals	Belgrade, Serbia	Decision (2:1)	3	2:00
2015-10-28	Win	(Iran) Ali Khanjari	2015 WAKO World Championships, First Round	Belgrade, Serbia	TKO		
2014-10-	Loss	(Moldova) Kristian Georgiev	2014 WAKO European Championships, Final	Bilbao, Spain	Decision (3:0)	3	2:00
Won the 2014 WAKO European Championships K-1 -86kg Silver Medal.
2014-10-	Win	(Moldova) Adrian Gologan	2014 WAKO European Championships, Semi Finals	Bilbao, Spain	Decision (3:0)	3	2:00
2014-10-	Win	(Italy) Samuele Canonico	2014 WAKO European Championships, Quarter Finals	Bilbao, Spain	Decision (2:1)	3	2:00
2014-10-	Win	(Latvia) Reinis Porozovs	2014 WAKO European Championships, First Round	Bilbao, Spain	Decision (3:0)	3	2:00
2013-10-23	Win	(Germany) Eugen Waigel	2013 World Combat Games, Final	Saint Petersburg, Russia	Decision	3	2:00
Won the 2013 World Combat Games Full Contact -91kg Gold Medal.
2013-10-21	Win	(Kyrgyzstan) Rashit Amankulov	2013 World Combat Games, Semi Final	Saint Petersburg, Russia	Decision (3:0)		
2013-10-20	Win	(Ukraine)	2013 World Combat Games, Quarter Final	Saint Petersburg, Russia	Decision (2:1)		
Legend: Win Loss Draw/No contest Notes

== Mixed martial arts record ==
Professional record breakdown
1 match	0 wins	0 losses
Draws	1	

Res.	Record	Opponent	Method	Event	Date	Round	Time	Location	Notes
Draw	0–0-1	Adis Taalaybek uulu	Decision	Samara MMA Federation: Battle on Volga 10	April 14, 2019	3	5:00	Toliatti, Russia	Welterweight debut.

== See also ==
- List of male kickboxers
