= Andrei Chekhonin =

Russian kickboxer and karateka

- Born: Andrey Sergeyevich Chekhonin; Андрей Сергеевич Чехонин; November 11, 1988 (age 37)
- Nationality: Russian
- Height: 1.80 m (5 ft 11 in)
- Weight: 84.40 kg (186.1 lb; 13.291 st)
- Division: Cruiserweight; Light heavyweight
- Style: Kickboxing, kyokushin, savate
- Team: Medved96; RusGym
- Trainer: George Sinitsky; Ruslan Krivusha (part-time)
- Rank: 2nd degree black belt in Kyokushin; under Shihan Ivo Kamenov

Kickboxing record
- Total: 40
- Wins: 30
- By knockout: 10
- Losses: 9
- By knockout: 1
- Draws: 1
- Last updated on: July 10, 2021

Andrey Sergeyevich Chekhonin (Russian: Андрей Сергеевич Чехонин; born 11 November 1988) is a Russian kickboxer, karateka and savateur. As of May 2022, he was the #7 ranked middleweight kickboxer in the world by Combat Press.

== Kickboxing career ==
Checkhonin took part in the -80 kilogram event of the 2016 Tatneft Cup. Although he was able to stop Alim Ozhev in the quarterfinals, held on August 11, 2016, and Surik Magakyan in the semifinals, held on September 22, 2016, he suffered a unanimous decision loss to Nikolay Lushin in the tournament finals, which were held on November 11, 2016.

Checkhonin participated in the 2017 Kung Fu World Cup two months later, as the one-day tournament for the KFWC Savate Pro World -80 kg title was held on January 24, 2017. He was able to overcome Nicola Gallo by unanimous decision in the semifinals, but suffered a split decision loss to Mehdi Kada in the finals.

Checkhonin fought in the -80 kilogram event of the 2017 Tatneft Cup as well, but lost the semifinal bout against Sher Mamazulunov by an extra round decision, after he himself won an extra round decision against Dimitris Chiotis in the tournament quarterfinals. Chechhonin would go on to lose two more fights, by decision to Mamuka Usubyan at Fair Fight IV on September 30, 2017, and by knockout to Artur Kyshenko at Kunlun Fight 68 on December 17, 2017.

Checkhonin made his SENSHI debut against Aslan Saduakas at Senshi 2 on April 20, 2019. He won the fight by a first-round knockout. Checkhonin then captured the Senshi Middleweight tournament title with second-round stoppages of Mohammad Amin Asadi and Ruslan Nasibulin at Senshi 3 on July 3, 2019.

Checkhonin faced Sergey Veselkin at WLF: Russia vs. China on September 20, 2019. He won the fight by decision.

Chechhonin faced the WAKO-Pro Low-Kick Rules Light Cruiserweight (-85.1 kg) World champion Abderrahim Chafay at Senshi 5 on February 22, 2020. He won the fight by a first-round technical knockout. A month later, Chechhonin took part in the Fair Fight Middleweight tournament, held at Fair Fight XI on March 21, 2020. He won the semifinal bout against Vladimir Degtyarev and the final bout against Gadzhi Majidov in the same manner - by decision.

Chechhonin faced Mădălin Mogoș for the KWU Middleweight Championship at Senshi 6 on August 21, 2020. He won the fight by a first-round knockout. Checkhonin then had his ten-fight winning streak snapped by Ali Aliyev at Battle of Champions 12 on November 13, 2020, who beat him by decision. He rebounded from this loss by making two successful KWU title defenses, as he beat Anwar Dira by a second-round technical knockout at Senshi 7 on February 27, 2021, in his first title defense and Ricardo Fernandes by a first-round knockout at Senshi 8 on May 22, 2021, in his second title defense.

== Championships and accomplishments ==
=== Professional ===
- Kyokushin World Union
  - 2020 KWU Middleweight Championship (two defenses)
- Fair Fight Promotion
  - 2020 Fair Fight Promotion Middleweight Championship
  - 2020 Fair Fight XI Middleweight Tournament winner
- World Association of Kickboxing Organizations
  - 2020 WAKO-Pro Low-Kick Rules World Championship -85.1 kg
- Battle of Champions
  - Battle of Champions Middleweight Championship
- Senshi
  - Senshi 3 Middleweight Tournament winner
- Tatneft Cup
  - 2016 Tatneft Cup -80 kg runner-up

=== Amateur ===
- World Association of Kickboxing Organizations
  - 2015 WAKO World Championships Low kick -86 kg (gold)

== Professional kickboxing record ==
Kickboxing record
30 wins (10 (T)KOs), 9 losses, 1 draw
Date	Result	Opponent	Event	Location	Method	Round	Time
2021-12-04	Loss	(Spain) Ruben Lee	Senshi 10	Varna, Bulgaria	Extra round decision (split)	4	3:00
2021-07-10	Loss	(Romania) Florin Lambagiu	Senshi 9	Varna, Bulgaria	Extra round decision (split)	4	3:00
Lost the KWU Middleweight Championship.
2021-05-22	Win	(Portugal) Ricardo Fernandes	Senshi 8	Sofia, Bulgaria	KO (low kick)	1	2:43
Defended the KWU Middleweight Championship.
2021-02-27	Win	(Netherlands) Anwar Dira	Senshi 7	Sofia, Bulgaria	TKO (referee stoppage)	2	2:05
Defended the KWU Middleweight Championship.
2020-11-13	Loss	(Russia) Ali Aliyev	Battle of Champions 12	Moscow, Russia	Decision	3	3:00
Lost the Battle of Champions Middleweight Championship.
2020-08-21	Win	(Romania) Mădălin Mogoș	Senshi 6	Varna, Bulgaria	KO (low kick)	1	0:32
Won the KWU Middleweight Championship.
2020-03-21	Win	(Russia) Gadzhi Majidov	Fair Fight XI, Final	Yekaterinburg, Russia	Decision	3	3:00
Won the Fair Fight Promotion Middleweight Championship.
2020-03-21	Win	(Russia) Vladimir Degtyarev	Fair Fight XI, Semifinal	Yekaterinburg, Russia	Decision	3	3:00
2020-02-22	Win	(France) Abderrahim Chafay	Senshi 5	Varna, Bulgaria	TKO (referee stoppage)	1	2:55
Won the WAKO-Pro Low-Kick Rules World Championship -85.1 kg.
2019-11-01	Win	(Russia) Ashabali Magomedov	Battle of Champions 11	Moscow, Russia	Decision	3	3:00
Won the Battle of Champions Middleweight Championship.
2019-09-20	Win	(Russia) Sergey Veselkin	WLF: Russia vs. China	Moscow, Russia	Decision	3	3:00
2019-07-03	Win	(Belarus) Ruslan Nasibulin	Senshi 3, Final	Varna, Bulgaria	TKO (referee stoppage)	2	1:58
Won the Senshi 3 Middleweight Tournament.
2019-07-03	Win	(Iran) Mohammad Amin Asadi	Senshi 3, Semifinal	Varna, Bulgaria	KO (left hook)	2	2:31
2019-04-20	Win	(Kazakhstan) Aslan Saduakas	Senshi 2	Bulgaria	KO (low kicks)	1	1:26
2018-09-18	Win	(Belarus) Dmitry Baranov	Royal Fight 4	Minsk, Belarus	Ext. R. decision (unanimous)	4	3:00
2017-12-17	Loss	(Ukraine) Artur Kyshenko	Kunlun Fight 68	China	KO (left body hook)	1	1:29
2017-09-30	Loss	(Russia) Mamuka Usubyan	Fair Fight IV	Yekaterinburg, Russia	Decision (unanimous)	3	3:00
2017-07-19	Loss	(Uzbekistan) Sher Mamazulunov	TATNEFT CUP 2017, -80 kg Quarter Final	Kazan, Russia	Ext.R decision	4	3:00
2017-04-22	Win	(Greece) Dimitris Chiotis	TATNEFT CUP 2017, -80 kg 1/8 Final	Kazan, Russia	Ext.R decision	4	3:00
2017-01-24	Loss	(France) Mehdi Kada	Kung Fu World Cup, Final	China	Decision (split)	3	2:00
For the KFWC Savate Pro World -80kg title.
2017-01-24	Win	(Italy) Nicola Gallo	Kung Fu World Cup, Semi Final	China	Decision (unanimous)	3	2:00
2016-11-11	Loss	(Russia) Nikolay Lushin	Tatneft Cup 2016, -80 kg Tournament Final	Kazan, Russia	Ext.R decision	4	3:00
For the 2016 Tatneft Cup -80kg title.
2016-09-22	Win	(Russia) Surik Magakyan	Tatneft Cup 2016, -80 kg Tournament Semi Final	Kazan, Russia	KO (low kick)	1	2:00
2016-08-11	Win	(Russia) Alim Ozhev	Tatneft Cup 2016, -80 kg Tournament Quarter Final	Kazan, Russia	KO (low kicks)	2	2:30
2014-11-21	Win	(Russia) Nikita Korotkikh	Battle of Champions 7	Moscow, Russia	Decision	3	3:00
2014-07-05	Win	(Russia) Andrei Mudrik	Clash of Champions Tournament, Final	Moscow, Russia	TKO (low kicks)		
Wins the CIS Kickboxing -91kg title.
2014-07-05	Win	(Kazakhstan) Askat Zhartunsynov	Clash of Champions Tournament, Semi Final	Moscow, Russia	Decision	3	3:00
2014-07-05	Win	(Belarus) Artem Sosnovsky	Clash of Champions Tournament, Quarter Final	Moscow, Russia	Decision	3	3:00
2014-04-26	Win	(Russia) Alexey Sidorenko	Russia Grand Prix, Final	Voronezh, Russia	Decision	3	3:00
2014-04-26	Win	(Russia) Nikita Chub	Russia Grand Prix, Semi Final	Voronezh, Russia	Decision	3	3:00
?	Win	(Russia) Vasily Azyrev		Russia	Decision	3	3:00
2012-04-28	Loss	(France) Zinedine Hameur-Lain	Tatneft Cup 2012, 1/4 final (+91 kg)	Kazan, Russia	Decision (unanimous)	4	3:00
2011-12-17	Win	(Germany) Patrik Lidert	Tatneft Cup 2011, -80 kg 1/8 Final	Kazan, Russia	Ext.R decision	4	3:00
2010-12-20	Win	(Ukraine) Mikhail Novikov	Tatneft Cup 2010, -80 kg 1/8 Final	Kazan, Russia	TKO (right hook)	1	2:15
Legend: Win Loss Draw/no contest Notes

== See also ==
- List of male kickboxers
