= Cyril Benzaquen =

French kickboxer

- Born: 2 October 1989 (age 37); Clamart, Hauts-de-Seine, France
- Nationality: French
- Height: 1.83 m (6 ft 0 in)
- Weight: 81 kg (179 lb; 12 st 11 lb)
- Division: Light heavyweight
- Style: Kickboxing
- Fighting out of: Paris, France
- Team: Team Zeitoun
- Trainer: André Zeitoun
- Years active: 2010 - present

Kickboxing record
- Total: 39
- Wins: 24
- By knockout: 3
- Losses: 12
- By knockout: 0
- Draws: 3

Other information
- University: Paris Dauphine University
- Website: http://www.cyrilbenzaquen.com/
- Boxing record from BoxRec

Cyril Benzaquen (born 2 October 1989) is a French Muay Thai fighter and kickboxer. He is the current ISKA World Light Heavyweight Oriental Rules champion.

As an amateur, Benzaquen twice medaled at the World Muaythai Federation World Championships and once at the IFMA European Championships.

== Personal life ==
Cyril works as a model.

He is of Moroccan-Jewish origin and of "traditionalist" Jewish faith.

After obtaining a scientific baccalauréat, he continued his studies at the IUT of Sceaux where he obtained a DUT in marketing. He then joined Paris-Dauphine University in a management license adapted to high-level athletes, then in a traditional management license, from which he graduated respectively in 2011 and 2013. He achieved a BAC + 5 at the University of Paris Dauphine. He obtained a master's degree in marketing in 2014 and a master's degree in entrepreneurship in 2015. For his end-of-studies project, supported by the It Agency, he organized the Dauphine Boxing Tour.

== Martial arts career ==
=== Early career ===
Benzaquen made his professional debut against Didier Charlesege at La Nuit Des Combattants on 22 May 2010. He won the fight by unanimous decision. He suffered his first professional loss in his next fight, as Raphael Mebenga beat him by unanimous decision at France Vs Thaïlande : Mabel Vs Saiyoke on 29 October 2010.

Benzaquen rebounded by winning his next four fights: he beat Alassane Sy by decision at La Bataille De L'Ile De France on 10 December 2010, Willy Prophete by decision at VXS Kickboxing Show on 23 April 2011, René Dione at La Nuit du Kick Boxing on 26 November 2011, and Manuel Romero at Kick-Boxing Show on 13 October 2012. He fought to a draw with Arthur Kouane at Konateam Cup on 21 May 2012.

Benzaquen's four-fight winning streak was snapped by a two-fight losing skid, as he dropped decisions to Francis Tavares at VXS Niglo New Concept on 11 May 2013, and Malik Aliane at Boxing Factory Trophy 2013 on 25 May 2013. He split wins and losses in his next two appearances, as he stopped Giorgio Galasso with a spinning backfist at Lion Promotion & NCA Web on 1 December 2013, but lost a decision to Djibril Ehouo at Grande Soirée de la Boxe on 1 February 2014.

Benzequan's victory over René Dione at Demi-Finales Nationales Japan Kick on 5 April 2014, earned him the chance to fight Abderrahim Chafay for the FFSCDA -81 kg title at Night Fighter 1 on 26 April 2014. He captured his first professional title by a second-round technical knockout.

=== ISKA Light heavyweight champion ===
Benzaquen faced Adelino Boa Morte for the vacant ISKA World Oriental Rules Light Heavyweight (-81.5 kg) championship at Dauphine Boxing Tour on 27 November 2015. He captured the title by unanimous decision. This victory earned Benzaquen his Glory debut, as he was booked to face Cédric Tousch at Glory 28: Paris on 12 March 2016. He lost the fight by unanimous decision.

Benzaquen made his first ISKA Light heavyweight title defense against Kevin Ward at Cavalaire Kickboxing Show on 28 May 2016. He retained the title by unanimous decision. Benzaquen then made two non-title bout appearances at Super Muaythai events. He first overcame Chase Walden by unanimous decision on 12 August 2016, which he followed up by another unanimous decision victory against Denis MuaythaiAcademy on 4 February 2017. Benzaquen made his ACB debut against Alexander Stetsurenko at ACB KB 13: From Paris with war on 25 March 2017. He won the fight by unanimous decision.

Benzaquen made his second ISKA World Oriental rules title defense against Mbamba Cauwenbergh at Triumph Fighting Tour on 22 June 2017. He retained the title by unanimous decision. Benzaquen challenged Elijah Bokeli for the WAKO-Pro World K-1 Light heavyweight title at Triumph Fighting Tour on 30 November 2018. He lost the fight by unanimous decision.

Bezaquen made his third ISKA title defense against Daniel Frigola at Triumph Fighting Tour on 13 June 2019. He won the fight by unanimous decision. Benzaquen made his fourth ISKA title defense against Ioannis Sofokleous at Triumph Fighting Tour on 12 December 2019. He retained the title by unanimous decision.

Benzaquen made his fifth ISKA title defense in a match against Florin Lambagiu on 31 May 2022, at Grand Palais Éphémère in Paris, France. He won the fight via unanimous decision, which was found controversial by several media outlets. The International Sport Karate Association commission eventually denied Lambagiu's appeal, but ordered a rematch within twelve months. On 22 May 2023, it was revealed that Lambagiu tested positive for undisclosed performance enhancing drugs on 31 May 2022 prior to Kickboxing Prestige. Lambagiu was subsequently banned from competing in France for four years.

=== GLORY ===
Benzequen made his GLORY debut against Soufian Abdelkhalek at Glory 91 on April 27, 2024. He lost the fight by unanimous decision.

== Championships and accomplishments ==
=== Professional ===
- International Sport Karate Association
  - 2015 ISKA Oriental Rules Light Heavyweight (-81.5 kg) World Champion
    - Six successful title defenses
  - 2025 ISKA Oriental Rules Light Heavyweight (-81.5 kg) World Champion

=== Amateur ===
- World Muaythai Federation
  - (silver) 2010 WMF World Championships (-81 kg)
  - (silver) 2012 WMF World Championships (-81 kg)
- International Federation of Muaythai Associations
  - (bronze) 2013 IFMA European Championships B-class (-81 kg)
- World Kickboxing Federation
  - (gold) 2013 WKF European K-1 Championships (-81 kg)
  - (gold) 2014 WKF World K-1 Championships (-81 kg)

== Kickboxing record ==
Professional kickboxing record
25 wins (4 (T)KOs), 12 losses, 3 draws, 0 no contests
Date	Result	Opponent	Event	Location	Method	Round	Time
2026-04-30	Win	(Italy) Samir Selmi	Championnat du Monde ISKA	Paris, France	TKO (low kicks)	3	1:37
Defended the ISKA Kickboxing World Light Heavyweight (-81.5 kg) title.
2026-02-12	Win	(Italy) Gino Coriolano	Gala International Kickboxing	Chartres, France	Decision (unanimous)	3	3:00
2025-12-20	Win	(Italy) Salvo Cubenda	La Nuit des Challenges 24	Saint-Fons, France	Decision (unanimous)	3	3:00
2025-05-21	Win	(Italy) Jacopo Tarantino	Championnat du Monde ISKA	Levallois-Perret, France	Decision (unanimous)	5	3:00
Wins the vacant ISKA World Oriental Rules Light Heavyweight (-81.5 kg) title.
2024-04-27	Loss	(Morocco) Soufian Abdelkhalek	Glory 91	Paris, France	Decision (unanimous)	3	3:00
2024-02-08	Loss	(France) Yohan Lidon	Lidon vs Benzaquen	Paris, France	Decision (split)	5	3:00
Loses the ISKA World Oriental Rules Light Heavyweight (-81.5 kg) title and fails to capture the WKN K-1 World -85kg title.
2023-11-08	Win	(Italy) Alpha Mamadou Kaba	Sarcelles Boxing Show 3	Sarcelles, France	Decision	3	3:00
2022-05-31	Win	(Romania) Florin Lambagiu	Kickboxing Prestige	Paris, France	Decision (unanimous)	5	3:00
Defends the ISKA World Oriental Rules Light Heavyweight (-81.5 kg) title.
2021-07-08	Win	(Italy) Angelo Mirno	Soiree Kickboxing Prestige	Paris, France	Decision (unanimous)	3	3:00
2019-12-12	Win	(Greece) Ioannis Sofokleous	Triumph Fighting Tour	Paris, France	Decision (unanimous)	5	3:00
Defends the ISKA World Oriental Rules Light Heavyweight (-81.5 kg) title.
2019-06-13	Win	(Spain) Daniel Frigola	Triumph Fighting Tour	Paris, France	Decision (unanimous)	5	3:00
Defends the ISKA World Oriental Rules Light Heavyweight (-81.5 kg) title.
2018-11-30	Loss	(France) Elijah Bokeli	Triumph Fighting Tour	France	Decision (unanimous)	5	3:00
For the WAKO-Pro World K-1 Light Heavyweight (-81.4 kg) title.
2018-08-04	Loss	(Italy) Giuseppe De Domenico	Fight Night Saint-Tropez, Tournament Finals	Saint-Tropez, France	Decision (unanimous)	3	3:00
2018-08-04	Win	(Slovakia) Erik Matejovsky	Fight Night Saint-Tropez, Tournament Semifinals	Saint-Tropez, France	Decision (unanimous)	3	3:00
2018-05-05	Loss	(France) Djibril Ehouo	Capital Fights 3	Paris, France	Decision (unanimous)	3	3:00
2018-04-08	Draw	(France) Wendy Annonay	Duel 3	Paris, France	Decision (unanimous)	3	3:00
2018-02-24	Draw	(Netherlands) Darryl Sichtman	ACB KB 13: From Paris with war	Paris, France	Decision (unanimous)	3	3:00
2017-12-09	Loss	(France) Rémy Vectol	Golden Fight	Levallois-Perret, France	Decision (unanimous)	3	3:00
2017-11-17	Loss	(France) Malik Aliane	Warriors Night	Paris, France	Decision (unanimous)	3	3:00
2017-06-22	Win	(Belgium) Mbamba Cauwenbergh	Triumph Fighting Tour	Paris, France	Decision (unanimous)	5	3:00
Defends the ISKA World Oriental Rules Light Heavyweight (-81.5 kg) title.
2017-03-25	Win	(Russia) Alexander Stetsurenko	ACB KB 9: Showdown in Paris	Paris, France	Decision (unanimous)	3	3:00
2017-02-04	Win	(Romania) Denis MuaythaiAcademy	Super Muaythai	Bangkok, Thailand	Decision (unanimous)	3	3:00
2016-08-12	Win	(United States) Chase Walden	Super Muaythai	Bangkok, Thailand	Decision (unanimous)	3	3:00
2016-05-28	Win	(United Kingdom) Kevin Ward	Cavalaire Kickboxing Show	Paris, France	Decision (unanimous)	5	3:00
Defends the ISKA World Oriental Rules Light Heavyweight (-81.5 kg) title.
2016-03-12	Loss	(France) Cédric Tousch	Glory 28: Paris	Paris, France	Decision (unanimous)	3	3:00
2015-11-27	Win	(Portugal) Adelino Boa Morte	Dauphine Boxing Tour	Paris, France	Decision (unanimous)	5	3:00
Wins the vacant ISKA World Oriental Rules Light Heavyweight (-81.5 kg) title.
2015-02-21	Win	(France) Reda Hameur-Lain	Le Choc des Best Fighters 3	Asnières-sur-Seine, France	TKO (retirement)	2	3:00
2014-04-26	Win	(France) Abderrahim Chafay	Night Fighter 1	Toulouse, France	TKO (punches)	2	
Wins the FFSCDA -81 kg title.
2014-04-05	Win	(France) René Dione	Demi-Finales Nationales Japan Kick	Groslay, France	Decision	3	3:00
2014-02-01	Loss	(France) Djibril Ehouo	Grande Soirée de la Boxe	La Riche, France	Decision	3	3:00
2013-12-01	Win	(Italy) Giorgio Galasso	Lion Promotion & NCA Web	Trieste, Italy	KO (spinning backfist)	4	
2013-05-25	Loss	(France) Malik Aliane	Boxing Factory Trophy 2013	Colomiers, France	Decision	5	3:00
2013-05-11	Loss	(France) Francis Tavares	VXS Niglo New Concept	Montpellier, France	Decision	3	3:00
2012-10-13	Win	(Spain) Manuel Romero	Kick-Boxing Show	Saint-Paul-de-Vence, France	Decision	3	3:00
2012-05-21	Draw	(France) Arthur Kouane	Konateam Cup	Villiers-sur-Marne, France	Decision	3	3:00
2011-11-26	Win	(France) René Dione	La Nuit du Kick Boxing	Les Mureaux, France	Decision	3	3:00
2011-04-23	Win	(France) Willy Prophete	VXS Kickboxing Show	Persan, France	Decision	3	3:00
2010-12-10	Win	(France) Alassane Sy	La Bataille De L'Ile De France	Nanterre, France	Decision	3	3:00
2010-10-29	Loss	(France) Raphael Mebenga	France Vs Thaïlande : Mabel Vs Saiyoke	Paris, France	Decision (unanimous)	5	3:00
2010-05-22	Win	(France) Didier Charlesege	La Nuit Des Combattants	Persan, France	Decision (unanimous)	3	3:00
Legend: Win Loss Draw/No contest Notes

Amateur Muay Thai record
Date	Result	Opponent	Event	Location	Method	Round	Time
2014-03-23	Win	(Brazil) Luis Bernica	2014 WKF World Championships, Tournament Final	Pattaya, Thailand	Decision	3	2:00
Wins the 2014 WKF World Championships K-1 Championships -81kg Gold Medal.
2014-03-22	Win	(Mexico) Mandel de Jesus	2014 WKF World Championships, Tournament Semifinal	Pattaya, Thailand	Decision	3	2:00
2013-11-02	Win	(Czech Republic) Henrich Pavel	2013 WKF European Championships, Tournament Final	Bregenz, Austria	Decision	3	2:00
Wins the 2013 WKF European K-1 Championships -81kg Gold Medal.
2013-10-30	Win	(Hungary) Milan Pokermi	2013 WKF European Championships, Tournament Semifinal	Bregenz, Austria	Decision	3	2:00
2013-10-28	Win	(Hungary) Thomas Gute	2013 WKF European Championships, Tournament Quarterfinal	Bregenz, Austria	Decision	3	2:00
2012-03-24	Loss	(Switzerland) Richard Jocr	2012 WMF World Championships, Tournament Final	Bangkok, Thailand	Decision	3	2:00
Wins the 2012 WMF World Championships -81kg Silver Medal.
2012-03-23	Win	(Paraguay) Somtos Losta	2012 WMF World Championships, Tournament Semifinal	Bangkok, Thailand	Decision	3	2:00
2012-03-22	Win	(Ukraine) Natan Borovitsky	2012 WMF World Championships, Tournament Quarterfinal	Bangkok, Thailand	Decision	3	2:00
2010-03-23	Loss	(Belarus) Pavel Revtovich	2010 WMF World Championships, Tournament Final	Bangkok, Thailand	Decision	3	2:00
Wins the 2010 WMF World Championships -81kg Silver Medal.
2010-03-22	Win	(Italy) Roberto Martullo	2010 WMF World Championships, Tournament Semifinal	Bangkok, Thailand	Decision	3	2:00
2010-03-21	Win	(Spain) Alessandro Lopez	2010 WMF World Championships, Tournament Quarterfinal	Bangkok, Thailand	Decision	3	2:00
Legend: Win Loss Draw/No contest Notes

== Professional boxing record ==
3 fights	1 win	2 losses
By decision	1	2

No.	Result	Record	Opponent	Type	Round, time	Date	Location	Notes
3	Loss	1–2	Mehdi Salouane	SD	4	9 Feb 2019	Dome de Paris-Palais des Sports, Paris, France	
2	Win	1–1	Jeffe Florentz	UD	4	23 Jun 2018	Dome de Paris-Palais des Sports, Paris, France	
1	Loss	0–1	Matthieu Bernardet	PTS	4	25 May 2018	Palais des Sports, Agde, France	

== See also ==
- List of male kickboxers
