= List of male kickboxers =

This is a list of notable male professional kickboxers.

== A ==
- (Azerbaijan) Parviz Abdullayev
- (Suriname) Donegi Abena
- (Germany) Lukas Achterberg
- (France) Thomas Adamandopoulos
- (Ukraine) Serhiy Adamchuk
- (United States) Romie Adanza
- (Romania) Benjamin Adegbuyi
- (New Zealand) Israel Adesanya
- (Netherlands) Peter Aerts
- (Japan) Ryo Aitaka
- (Morocco) Mehdi Ait El Hadj
- (Belarus) Vitali Akhramenko
- (Russia) Viktor Akimov
- (Armenia) Zhora Akopyan
- (France) Damien Alamos
- (Bulgaria) Eduard Aleksanyan
- (Brazil) Cosmo Alexandre
- (United States) Dennis Alexio
- (Japan) Ayinta Ali
- (France) Thomas Alizier
- (Belarus) Chingiz Allazov
- (Brazil) César Almeida
- (Japan) Hiromi Amada
- (Brazil) Andre Amade
- (Morocco) Mohamed Amine
- (Morocco) Mosab Amrani
- (Japan) Rukiya Anpo
- (Brazil) Fabiano Aoki
- (China) Jia Aoqi
- (Japan) Shoa Arii
- (Morocco) Chalid Arrab
- (Japan) Hirotaka Asahisa
- (Japan) Taio Asahisa
- (Japan) Ryusei Ashizawa
- (Russia) Dzhabar Askerov
- (France) Pacôme Assi
- (Romania) Ionuţ Atodiresei
- (France) Fabrice Aurieng
- (Turkey) Yuksel Ayaydin
- (Turkey) Murat Aygun
- (Russia) Timur Aylyarov
- (Iran) Iraj Azizpour

== B ==
- (Myanmar) Kyar Ba Nyein
- (Myanmar) Saw Ba Oo
- (Armenia) Melsik Baghdasaryan
- (Switzerland) Xhavit Bajrami
- (France) Bilal Bakhouche-Chareuf
- (Netherlands) Gilbert Ballantine
- (Suriname) Ashwin Balrak
- (Thailand) Buakaw Banchamek
- (Thailand) Petchtanong Banchamek
- (Thailand) Superbon Banchamek
- (United States) Wayne Barrett
- (United States) Pat Barry
- (Slovakia) Ivan Bartek
- (France) Xavier Bastard
- (United Kingdom) Jamie Bates
- (Spain) Moises Baute
- (Angola) Christian Baya
- (Tunisia) Yousri Belgaroui
- (Croatia) Dino Belošević
- (Morocco) Jamal Ben Saddik
- (France) Karim Bennoui
- (France) Cyril Benzaquen
- (Switzerland) Shemsi Beqiri
- (South Africa) Mike Bernardo
- (Belarus) Yuri Bessmertny
- (Morocco) Tyjani Beztati
- (Ukraine) Dmitry Bezus
- (China) Fang Bian
- (France) Dany Bill
- (France) Guerric Billet
- (Russia) Valeriy Bizyaev
- (United States) Randy Blake
- (Ghana) Michael Boapeah
- (Croatia) Josip Bodrozic
- (France) Rafi Bohic
- (Switzerland) Ulrik Bokeme
- (Netherlands) Remy Bonjasky
- (Russia) Astemir Borsov
- (China) Zhao Boshi
- (South Africa) Francois Botha
- (Morocco) Yassine Boughanem
- (Morocco) Youssef Boughanem
- (Morocco) Mohammed Boutasaa
- (Netherlands) Mourad Bouzidi
- (Uzbekistan) Anvar Boynazarov
- (Romania) Gabriel Bozan
- (Netherlands) Sem Braan
- (Switzerland) Bjorn Bregy
- (Croatia) Mladen Brestovac
- (Canada) Clifton Brown
- (United Kingdom) Rhys Brudenell
- (Belarus) Igor Bugaenko
- (Morocco) Ilias Bulaid
- (United States) Curtis Bush

== C ==
- (Suriname) Redouan Cairo
- (Portugal) Diogo Calado
- (Romania) Sorin Căliniuc
- (France) Diaguely Camara
- (Italy) Allessandro Campagna
- (Canada) Shane Campbell
- (Netherlands) Lucien Carbin
- (United Kingdom) Nico Carrillo
- (Italy) Gabriele Casella
- (Brazil) Saulo Cavalari
- (France) Abderrahim Chafay
- (Morocco) Faldir Chahbari
- (Myanmar) Wan Chai
- (Russia) Mikhail Chalykh
- (New Zealand) Shane Chapman
- (Myanmar) Lone Chaw
- (United States) Rick Cheek
- (Russia) Andrei Chekhonin
- (Japan) David Chibana
- (Georgia (country)) Giga Chikadze
- (South Korea) Hong Man Choi
- (China) Zhao Chongyang
- (France) Gregory Choplin
- (Thailand) Lerdsila Chumpairtour
- (Thailand) Jomthong Chuwattana
- (Thailand) Lamsongkram Chuwattana
- (Croatia) Branko Cikatić
- (Romania) Sebastian Ciobanu
- (Netherlands) Robin Ciric
- (Republic of Ireland) Sean Clancy
- (Italy) Roberto Cocco
- (France) Bruce Codron
- (South Africa) Vuyisile Colossa
- (United States) Carlos Condit
- (United States) Dale Cook
- (United States) Dewey Cooper
- (United States) Kit Cope
- (Australia) Nathan Corbett
- (Spain) César Córdoba
- (France) Abdarhmane Coulibaly
- (Romania) Sebastian Cozmâncă
- (Serbia) Miloš Cvjetićanin

== D ==
- (Sweden) Sanny Dahlbeck
- (England) Paul Daley
- (United States) Raymond Daniels
- (Australia) Daniel Dawson
- (Belgium) Marc de Bonte
- (Netherlands) Thian de Vries
- (Netherlands) Ramon Dekkers
- (United States) Shane del Rosario
- (Turkey) Deniz Demirkapu
- (Turkey) Erhan Deniz
- (Canada) Jonathan Di Bella
- (Algeria) Dida Diafat
- (Turkey) Murat Direkçi
- (England) Simon Dore
- (France) Cédric Doumbé
- (Netherlands) Brian Douwes
- (Armenia) Gago Drago
- (Netherlands) Michael Duut

== E ==
- (United States) Marvin Eastman
- (Japan) Mutsuki Ebata
- (Japan) Rui Ebata
- (Australia) Ben Edwards
- (Suriname) Regian Eersel
- (Japan) Yuki Egawa
- (Morocco) Boubaker El Bakouri
- (Morocco) Khalid El Bakouri
- (Morocco) Ibrahim El Bouni
- (Morocco) Ibrahim El Boustati
- (Morocco) Hicham El Gaoui
- (Morocco) Ilias Ennahachi
- (Turkey) Serdar Yiğit Eroğlu
- (United States) Eric Esch
- (Morocco) Hamza Essalih
- (Greece) Stavros Exakoustidis
- (Morocco) Abdellah Ezbiri

== F ==
- (Thailand) Naruepol Fairtex
- (Thailand) Yodsanklai Fairtex
- (Italy) Mattia Faraoni
- (France) Johann Fauveau
- (Brazil) Glaube Feitosa
- (Brazil) Francisco Filho
- (Croatia) Mirko Filipović
- (France) Djany Fiorenti
- (Finland) Daniel Forsberg
- (France) Charles François
- (Japan) Arashi Fujihara
- (Japan) Yusuke Fujimoto
- (Japan) Toshio Fujiwara

== G ==
- (Romania) Eduard Gafencu
- (Thailand) Nong-O Gaiyanghadao
- (Spain) Daniel Puertas Gallardo
- (China) Meng Gaofeng
- (United States) Elvis Gashi
- (Brazil) Bruno Gazani
- (Belarus) Andrey Gerasimchuk
- (Netherlands) Hesdy Gerges
- (Iran) Mohammad Ghaedibardeh
- (France) Karim Ghajji
- (Nepal) Abiral Ghimire
- (Romania) Daniel Ghiţă
- (United States) Manson Gibson
- (Australia) Frank Giorgi
- (Turkey) İbrahim Giydirir
- (Poland) Michał Głogowski
- (Latvia) Konstantin Gluhov
- (Netherlands) Massaro Glunder
- (Netherlands) Rodney Glunder
- (Ukraine) Enriko Gogokhia
- (Trinidad and Tobago) Gary Goodridge
- (Russia) Denis Grachev
- (Australia) Peter Graham
- (Australia) Sam Greco
- (Armenia) Harut Grigorian
- (Armenia) Marat Grigorian
- (Netherlands) Murthel Groenhart
- (France) Franck Gross
- (France) Brice Guidon
- (Poland) Adrian Gunia
- (Turkey) Ali Gunyar
- (Belarus) Sergei Gur
- (Belarus) Vitaly Gurkov

== H ==
- (Italy) Mustapha Haida
- (France) Zinedine Hameur-Lain
- (Morocco) Hamicha
- (France) Akram Hamidi
- (Morocco) Chahid Hammouti
- (Japan) Ryu Hanaoka
- (Belarus) Dzianis Hancharonak
- (Japan) Kento Haraguchi
- (Netherlands) Antoni Hardonk
- (Morocco) Badr Hari
- (Sweden) Alex Tobiasson Harris
- (England) Liam Harrison
- (England) Lee Hasdell
- (Japan) Kenta Hayashi
- (Morocco) Mohamed Hendouf
- (Spain) Javier Hernandez
- (Netherlands) Ivan Hippolyte
- (Japan) Ren Hiramoto
- (Japan) Ryoga Hirano
- (Japan) Koudai Hirayama
- (Japan) Hiroya
- (Japan) Hyuma Hitachi
- (United States) Russ Hogue
- (United States) Ky Hollenbeck
- (Sweden) Martin Holm
- (Netherlands) Nieky Holzken
- (Netherlands) Henri Hooft
- (Netherlands) Ernesto Hoost
- (Japan) Hiraku Hori
- (Bulgaria) Teodor Hristov
- (Czech Republic) Tomáš Hron
- (Switzerland) Andy Hug
- (New Zealand) Mark Hunt
- (Czech Republic) Ondřej Hutník

== I ==
- (Romania) Ionuț Iancu
- (Romania) Ionuţ Iftimoaie
- (Belarus) Alexey Ignashov
- (Japan) Koji Ikeda
- (Germany) Danyo Ilunga
- (United States) Toby Imada
- (Brazil) Guto Inocente
- (Russia) Beybulat Isaev
- (Japan) Issei Ishii
- (Croatia) Satoshi Ishii
- (Japan) Naoki Ishikawa
- (Italy) Claudio Istrate
- (Japan) Kan Itabashi
- (Romania) Florin Ivănoaie

== J ==
- (United States) Dustin Jacoby
- (Morocco) Aziz Jahjah
- (India) Singh Jaideep
- (France) Corentin Jallon
- (Scotland) Duncan Airlie James
- (Poland) Łukasz Jarosz
- (Canada) Josh Jauncey
- (Poland) Pawel Jedrzejczyk
- (China) Qiu Jianliang
- (Serbia) Dragan Jovanović
- (Estonia) Uku Jürjendal
- (China) Wang Junguang
- (Croatia) Igor Jurković

== K ==
- (Japan) K-Jee
- (Albania) Besim Kabashi
- (Thailand) Kaoklai Kaennorsing
- (Netherlands) Leroy Kaestner
- (Thailand) Anuwat Kaewsamrit
- (Japan) Ryuji Kajiwara
- (Japan) Nobuaki Kakuda
- (South Africa) Virgil Kalakoda
- (Netherlands) Rob Kaman
- (Japan) Shoki Kaneda
- (Japan) Akihiro Kaneko
- (Japan) Tsubasa Kaneko
- (France) Florent Kaouachi
- (Russia) Ruslan Karaev
- (Armenia) Karapet Karapetyan
- (Iran) Sina Karimian
- (Japan) Yuki Kasahara
- (Poland) Dawid Kasperski
- (Japan) Hisaki Kato
- (Japan) Kona Kato
- (Japan) Yugo Kato
- (Japan) Taiga Kawabe
- (Japan) Kyo Kawakami
- (Japan) Shuji Kawarada
- (Germany) Enriko Kehl
- (France) Freddy Kemayo
- (Morocco) Nabil Khachab
- (Morocco) Mohammed Khamal
- (Russia) Sergei Kharitonov
- (Russia) Batu Khasikov
- (Morocco) Tarik Khbabez
- (Thailand) Jomhod Kiatadisak
- (Thailand) Petpanomrung Kiatmuu9
- (Thailand) Rungnarai Kiatmuu9
- (Thailand) Superlek Kiatmuu9
- (Thailand) Changpuek Kiatsongrit
- (Japan) Yasuhiro Kido
- (Brazil) Minoru Kimura
- (Japan) Taiei Kin
- (Georgia (country)) Davit Kiria
- (Japan) Satoshi Kobayashi
- (Japan) Takayuki Kohiruimaki
- (Japan) Koji
- (Japan) Koki
- (Japan) Kosuke Komiyama
- (France) Moussa Konaté
- (France) Souleimane Konate
- (Japan) Kaisei Kondo
- (Switzerland) Yoann Kongolo
- (Bulgaria) Stoyan Koprivlenski
- (Belarus) Andrei Kotsur
- (Russia) Nikita Kozlov
- (Netherlands) Albert Kraus
- (Albania) Rustemi Kreshnik
- (Bosnia and Herzegovina) Ahmed Krnjić
- (Sweden) Jörgen Kruth
- (Ukraine) Roman Kryklia
- (Japan) Kenji Kubo
- (Japan) Yuta Kubo
- (Belarus) Alexei Kudin
- (Croatia) Mladen Kujundžić
- (Belarus) Andrei Kulebin
- (Ukraine) Sergey Kulyaba
- (Japan) Ryusei Kumagai
- (Japan) Masashi Kumura
- (Japan) Shuhei Kumura
- (Japan) Toma Kuroda
- (Thailand) Phet Utong Or. Kwanmuang
- (Thailand) Saeksan Or. Kwanmuang
- (Netherlands) Chico Kwasi
- (Netherlands) Fabio Kwasi
- (Myanmar) Moe Kyoe
- (Ukraine) Artur Kyshenko

== L ==
- (France) Sofian Laidouni
- (Romania) Florin Lambagiu
- (Ukraine) Sergei Lascenko
- (Romania) Ștefan Lătescu
- (Denmark) Ole Laursen
- (Vietnam) Cung Le
- (France) Jérôme Le Banner
- (Canada) Dave Leduc
- (South Korea) Chan Hyung Lee
- (South Korea) Su Hwan Lee
- (China) Xie Lei
- (Germany) Stefan Leko
- (United States) Jean-Claude Leuyer
- (Russia) Artem Levin
- (United States) Joe Lewis
- (France) Yohan Lidon
- (United States) Scott Lighty
- (South Korea) Chi Bin Lim
- (Cape Verde) Alviar Lima
- (Albania) Mirdi Limani
- (Myanmar) Soe Lin Oo
- (France) Raphaël Llodra
- (Suriname) Frank Lobman
- (Suriname) Ismael Londt
- (China) Yi Long
- (Greece) Stan Longinidis
- (Thailand) Coban Lookchaomaesaitong
- (Spain) Jorge Loren
- (Switzerland) Fabian Lorito
- (United States) Duane Ludwig
- (Romania) Alexandru Lungu

== M ==
- (France) Abdallah Mabel
- (Brazil) Ariel Machado
- (Japan) Keijiro Maeda
- (Russia) Magomed Magomedov
- (France) Nordine Mahieddine
- (France) Elias Mahmoudi
- (Brazil) Eduardo Maiorino
- (Switzerland) Petar Majstorovic
- (Switzerland) Azem Maksutaj
- (Thailand) Malaipet
- (Uzbekistan) Sher Mamazulunov
- (Japan) Jin Mandokoro
- (Suriname) Cedric Manhoef
- (Netherlands) Melvin Manhoef
- (Netherlands) Andre Mannaart
- (Netherlands) Roel Mannaart
- (Canada) Simon Marcus
- (Netherlands) D'Angelo Marshall
- (Jamaica) Boy Boy Martin
- (Japan) Masato
- (Lithuania) Sergej Maslobojev
- (Israel) Ariel Mastov
- (Belgium) Alka Matewa
- (Japan) Ryuki Matsuda
- (Japan) Shintaro Matsukura
- (Romania) Valentin Mavrodin
- (Romania) Adrian Maxim
- (France) Jonathan Mayezo
- (United States) Rob McCullough
- (Canada) Michael McDonald
- (Australia) Steve McKinnon
- (United Kingdom) James McSweeney
- (Thailand) Aikpracha Meenayothin
- (Thailand) Chanalert Meenayothin
- (Mexico) Javier Mendez
- (Russia) Dmitry Menshikov
- (Netherlands) Joerie Mes
- (Japan) Kazuki Miburo
- (Cyprus) Savvas Michael
- (Brazil) Thiago Michel
- (Brazil) Felipe Micheletti
- (Croatia) Igor Mihaljević
- (Croatia) Teo Mikelić
- (Croatia) Toni Milanović
- (United States) Jarrell Miller
- (United States) Mark Miller
- (France) Ludovic Millet
- (Myanmar) Tun Tun Min
- (Russia) Vladimir Mineev
- (China) Yang Ming
- (Brazil) Vitor Miranda
- (Japan) Fukashi Mizutani
- (Russia) Anatoly Moiseev
- (Japan) Keisuke Monguchi
- (Australia) Soren Monkongtong
- (France) Gaylord Montier
- (Slovakia) Vladimír Moravčík
- (Japan) Yosuke Morii
- (Lithuania) Remigijus Morkevičius
- (Romania) Cătălin Moroşanu
- (Sweden) Mostafa Mosadegh
- (France) Vang Moua
- (Netherlands) Gegard Mousasi
- (Australia) Steve Moxon
- (Slovakia) Tomáš Možný
- (United States) Chaz Mulkey
- (Spain) Frank Muñoz
- (Japan) Yuta Murakoshi
- (Japan) Musashi
- (Poland) Kacper Muszyński
- (Democratic Republic of the Congo) Zack Mwekassa

== N ==
- (Russia) Kiamran Nabati
- (Azerbaijan) Alim Nabiev
- (Japan) Kazane Nagai
- (Japan) Yuichiro Nagashima
- (France) Eddy Nait Slimani
- (Japan) Taiki Naito
- (Japan) Chihiro Nakajima
- (Japan) Hiroki Nakajima
- (Japan) Kan Nakamura
- (Japan) Ryota Nakano
- (Ukraine) Petro Nakonechnyi
- (New Zealand) Antz Nansen
- (Mongolia) Jadamba Narantungalag
- (Russia) Asadulla Nasipov
- (Japan) Tenshin Nasukawa
- (Thailand) Jo Nattawut
- (Brazil) Marcio Navarro
- (Romania) Alin Nechita
- (Myanmar) Saw Nga Man
- (Hong Kong) Alain Ngalani
- (Democratic Republic of the Congo) Chris Ngimbi
- (France) Hamza Ngoto
- (Japan) Takahito Niimi
- (France) Stéphane Nikiéma
- (China) Wei Ninghui
- (Japan) Masaaki Noiri
- (United States) K. J. Noons
- (Thailand) Samingdet Nor.Anuwatgym
- (South Africa) Jan Nortje

== O ==
- (Sweden) Marcus Öberg
- (United States) Shane Oblonsky
- (Lithuania) Arnold Oborotov
- (Switzerland) Volkan Oezdemir
- (Japan) Eisaku Ogasawara
- (Japan) Kenichi Ogata
- (Japan) Takaya Ogura
- (Japan) Tatsuya Oiwa
- (Japan) Ryuya Okuwaki
- (Ukraine) Alexander Oleinik
- (Nigeria) Andy Ologun
- (Japan) Ryunosuke Omori
- (Japan) Kaito Ono
- (Serbia) Rade Opačić
- (Romania) Ștefan Orza
- (Japan) Kazuki Osaki
- (Japan) Koki Osaki
- (Japan) Fumiya Osawa
- (Japan) Haruaki Otsuki
- (Morocco) Chahid Oulad El Hadj
- (Morocco) L'houcine Ouzgni
- (Netherlands) Alistair Overeem
- (Netherlands) Valentijn Overeem
- (Netherlands) Jay Overmeer
- (Japan) Keiji Ozaki
- (Japan) Kaito Ozawa
- (Turkey) Serkan Ozcaglayan
- (Turkey) Tayfun Ozcan
- (Turkey) Yetkin Özkul

== P ==
- (Thailand) Pakorn P.K. Saenchai Muaythaigym
- (Thailand) Saensatharn P.K. Saenchai Muaythaigym
- (Serbia) Nenad Pagonis
- (Thailand) Pajonsuk
- (Russia) Alexei Papin
- (Romania) Amansio Paraschiv
- (Armenia) Sahak Parparyan
- (Australia) John Wayne Parr
- (France) Rémi Parra
- (Thailand) Samart Payakaroon
- (China) Zhang Peimian
- (Albania) Berjan Peposhi
- (Brazil) Alex Pereira
- (Thailand) Sorgraw Petchyindee
- (Thailand) Capitan Petchyindee Academy
- (Thailand) Petchdam Petchyindee Academy
- (Thailand) Praewprao PetchyindeeAcademy
- (Greece) Tosca Petridis
- (Romania) Călin Petrișor
- (Italy) Armen Petrosyan
- (Italy) Giorgio Petrosyan
- (United States) Seth Petruzelli
- (Japan) Koichi Pettas
- (Japan) Leona Pettas
- (Denmark) Nicholas Pettas
- (Germany) James Phillips
- (Cambodia) Eh Phoutong
- (Poland) Marcel Piersa
- (Netherlands) Jordann Pikeur
- (France) Fabio Pinca
- (Poland) Marek Piotrowski
- (Suriname) Marco Piqué
- (France) Mickael Piscitello
- (Russia) Aleksandr Pitchkounov
- (Thailand) Yodlekpet Or. Pitisak
- (Thailand) Muangthai PKSaenchaimuaythaigym
- (Poland) Lukasz Plawecki
- (Croatia) Antonio Plazibat
- (Switzerland) Slavo Polugic
- (Russia) Sergey Ponomarev
- (Thailand) Yodwicha Por Boonsit
- (Bosnia and Herzegovina) Dževad Poturak
- (Croatia) Agron Preteni
- (United States) Alvin Prouder
- (Thailand) Saiyok Pumpanmuang

== Q ==
- (China) Wang Qiang
- (China) Lin Qiangbang
- (France) Patrice Quarteron

== R ==
- (Thailand) F-16 Rachanon
- (Montenegro) Goran Radonjic
- (Azerbaijan) Bahram Rajabzadeh
- (Russia) Ramazan Ramazanov
- (Thailand) Superbank Mor Ratanabandit
- (France) Yannick Reine
- (Portugal) José Reis
- (Portugal) Luis Reis
- (Spain) Jordi Requejo
- (New Zealand) Brad Riddell
- (Netherlands) Levi Rigters
- (Italy) Alessandro Riguccini
- (Argentina) Marcos Rios
- (Spain) Jonay Risco
- (Romania) Cristian Ristea
- (Suriname) Andy Ristie
- (Spain) Alex Rivas
- (Ukraine) Tsotne Rogava
- (France) Darren Rolland
- (Belarus) Petr Romankevich
- (Spain) Abraham Roqueñi
- (United States) Kevin Rosier
- (United States) Kevin Ross
- (United States) Ben Rothwell
- (United States) Jeff Roufus
- (United States) Rick Roufus
- (Netherlands) Fred Royers
- (Suriname) Jairzinho Rozenstruik
- (China) Wei Rui
- (Cambodia) Keo Rumchong
- (Moldova) Constantin Rusu
- (Netherlands) Bas Rutten

== S ==
- (France) Bobo Sacko
- (Montenegro) Arian Sadiković
- (Thailand) Kaonar P.K.SaenchaiMuaythaiGym
- (Thailand) Kongsak Saenchaimuaythaigym
- (Thailand) Muangthai P.K. Saenchaimuaythaigym
- (Thailand) Suakim PK Saenchaimuaythaigym
- (Thailand) Tawanchai PK Saenchaimuaythaigym
- (Myanmar) Shwe Sai
- (Japan) Haruma Saikyo
- (Japan) Yuma Saikyo
- (Japan) Kaito Sakaguchi
- (Turkey) Gökhan Saki
- (Russia) Muslim Salikhov
- (France) Dylan Salvador
- (England) Daniel Sam
- (Belarus) Zabit Samedov
- (Cambodia) Prom Samnang
- (France) Samy Sana
- (Norway) Simón Santana
- (United States) Bob Sapp
- (Poland) Tomasz Sarara
- (Japan) Daizo Sasaki
- (Japan) Junki Sasaki
- (Japan) Masaaki Satake
- (Thailand) Detrit Sathian Gym
- (Japan) Yoshihiro Sato
- (Japan) Satoruvashicoba
- (Iran) Mahmoud Sattari
- (Iran) Sajad Sattari
- (Japan) Taiki Sawatani
- (Japan) Junichi Sawayashiki
- (United States) Joe Schilling
- (Netherlands) Semmy Schilt
- (New Zealand) Ray Sefo
- (Japan) Takeru Segawa
- (Uganda) Umar Semata
- (Curaçao) Endy Semeleer
- (Japan) Riamu Sera
- (Belarus) Dmitry Shakuta
- (Ukraine) Roman Shcherbatiuk
- (United States) Jake Shields
- (Japan) Kotaro Shimano
- (Japan) Kengo Shimizu
- (Japan) Asahi Shinagawa
- (Japan) Yuto Shinohara
- (Japan) Tatsuki Shinotsuka
- (Japan) Shirō
- (Belarus) Vasily Shish
- (Japan) Hiroki Shishido
- (China) Huang Shuailu
- (Bulgaria) Bogdan Shumarov
- (Italy) Fabio Siciliani
- (Netherlands) Fred Sikking
- (United States) Mighty Mo Siligia
- (Brazil) Anderson Silva
- (Brazil) Antônio Silva
- (Suriname) Rayen Simson
- (Thailand) Sirimongkol Singwangcha
- (Thailand) Apidej Sit Hrun
- (Thailand) Nong-O Sit Or
- (Thailand) Yodkhunpon Sitmonchai
- (Thailand) Kem Sitsongpeenong
- (Thailand) Sitthichai Sitsongpeenong
- (Thailand) Thongchai Sitsongpeenong
- (Thailand) Littewada Sitthikul
- (Czech Republic) Václav Sivák
- (France) Jean-Charles Skarbowsky
- (Czech Republic) Daniel Škvor
- (Belarus) Valentin Slavikovski
- (Poland) Paul Slowinski
- (Morocco) Younes Smaili
- (Netherlands) Peter Smit
- (United States) Maurice Smith
- (United States) Patrick Smith
- (Japan) Yasuomi Soda
- (Cambodia) Phal Sophorn
- (Thailand) Kongthoranee Sor.Sommai
- (Thailand) Dejdamrong Sor Amnuaysirichoke
- (Thailand) Petch Sor Chitpattana
- (Thailand) Jawsuayai Sor.Dechaphan
- (Thailand) Saenchai Sor Kingstar
- (Thailand) Sudsakorn Sor Klinmee
- (Thailand) Sangmanee Sor Tienpo
- (Thailand) Bovy Sor Udomson
- (Romania) Ciprian Sora
- (Czech Republic) Jan Soukup
- (Netherlands) Andy Souwer
- (Romania) Cristian Spetcu
- (Suriname) Tyrone Spong
- (Croatia) Ivan Stanić
- (Switzerland) Daniel Stefanovski
- (Poland) Piotr Stępień
- (Russia) Alexander Stetsurenko
- (South Africa) Warren Stevelmans
- (Greece) Giannis Stoforidis
- (Romania) Andrei Stoica
- (Romania) Bogdan Stoica
- (United States) Dustin Stoltzfus
- (Montenegro) Ivan Strugar
- (South Korea) Lee Sung-hyun
- (Thailand) Pajonsuk SuperPro Samui
- (France) Stephane Susperregui
- (New Zealand) Jason Suttie
- (Japan) Chihiro Suzuki
- (Japan) Hiroaki Suzuki
- (Japan) Masahiko Suzuki

== T ==
- (New Zealand) Jordan Tai
- (Japan) Gunji Taito
- (Japan) Kozo Takeda
- (Japan) Yoshiki Takei
- (Japan) Masaki Takeuchi
- (Japan) Shota Takiya
- (Japan) Toki Tamaru
- (Japan) Toma Tanabe
- (Japan) Naoki Tanaka
- (Japan) Akebono Tarō
- (United States) Andrew Tate
- (Netherlands) Luis Tavares
- (Brazil) Ewerton Teixeira
- (Japan) Takumi Terada
- (Japan) Nobuchika Terado
- (Japan) Ryoga Terayama
- (Poland) Maciej Tercjak
- (Netherlands) Martin Terpstra
- (Thailand) Thanonchai Thanakorngym
- (Thailand) Dieselnoi Chor Thanasukarn
- (Canada) Jean-Yves Thériault
- (United States) Cliff Thomas
- (United Kingdom) Tim Thomas
- (United Kingdom) Michael Thompson
- (South Africa) Andrew Thomson
- (France) Ulrich Tiebe
- (Russia) Turpal Tokaev
- (Croatia) Marko Tomasović
- (France) Gregory Tony
- (Myanmar) Too Too
- (Serbia) Ognjen Topic
- (Thailand) Diesellek TopkingBoxing
- (Morocco) Mohamed Touchassie
- (France) Pascal Touré
- (France) Cédric Tousch
- (Japan) Tatsuya Tsubakihara
- (Russia) Vlad Tuinov
- (Myanmar) Tun Lwin Moe
- (Myanmar) Tun Tun Min
- (United Kingdom) Gary Turner
- (Moldova) Constantin Țuțu

== U ==
- (Netherlands) Perry Ubeda
- (Japan) Taisei Umei
- (Japan) Genji Umeno
- (Japan) Hirotaka Urabe
- (Japan) Koya Urabe
- (United States) Benny Urquidez
- (Russia) Alexander Ustinov
- (Russia) Mamuka Usubyan

== V ==
- (Russia) Artem Vakhitov
- (United States) Bart Vale
- (Belarus) Dmitry Valent
- (Canada) Joseph Valtellini
- (Belgium) Jean-Claude Van Damme
- (Netherlands) Lloyd van Dams
- (Netherlands) Ricardo van den Bos
- (Netherlands) Henri van Opstal
- (Netherlands) Robin van Roosmalen
- (United States) Kevin VanNostrand
- (Spain) Jorge Varela
- (Canada) Gabriel Varga
- (Hungary) Péter Varga
- (Albania) Valdrin Vatnikaj
- (Netherlands) Santino Verbeek
- (Netherlands) Darryl Verdonk
- (United States) A.J. Verel
- (Netherlands) Rico Verhoeven
- (Belgium) Filip Verlinden
- (Netherlands) Stjepan Veselic
- (Russia) Sergey Veselkin
- (Mexico) Abraham Vidales
- (France) Farid Villaume
- (New Zealand) Doug Viney
- (Romania) Silviu Vitez
- (United States) Paul Vizzio
- (Czech Republic) Petr Vondracek
- (Estonia) Maxim Vorovski
- (Ukraine) Igor Vovchanchyn
- (Suriname) Ginty Vrede

== W ==
- (Japan) Hiromi Wajima
- (England) Steven Wakeling
- (United States) Bill Wallace
- (Belgium) Brecht Wallis
- (France) Nicolas Wamba
- (United States) James Warring
- (Japan) Hinata Watanabe
- (Japan) Kazuhisa Watanabe
- (England) Jordan Watson
- (Australia) Adam Watt
- (Thailand) Gonnapar Weerasakreck
- (China) Han Wenbao
- (China) Wang Wenfeng
- (Germany) Priest West
- (Suriname) Sergio Wielzen
- (Netherlands) Jahfarr Wilnis
- (Netherlands) Jason Wilnis
- (United States) Don "The Dragon" Wilson
- (Suriname) Donovan Wisse
- (Thailand) Orono Wor Petchpun
- (Thailand) Phetmorakot Wor Sangprapai
- (Thailand) Rungkit Wor.Sanprapai
- (Germany) Dennis Wosik

== X ==
- (Italy) Françesco Xhaja
- (China) Wu Xuesong

== Y ==
- (Japan) YA-MAN
- (Turkey) Şahin Yakut
- (Japan) Kenta Yamada
- (Japan) Kosei Yamada
- (Japan) Koyata Yamada
- (Japan) Genki Yamamoto
- (Japan) Masahiro Yamamoto
- (Japan) Norifumi Yamamoto
- (Japan) Yuya Yamamoto
- (Japan) Tetsuya Yamato
- (Japan) Hideaki Yamazaki
- (China) Xu Yan
- (Japan) Ryūshi Yanagisawa
- (Japan) Haruto Yasumoto
- (Armenia) Jegish Yegoian
- (Myanmar) Mite Yine
- (China) Jin Ying
- (Japan) Tomoya Yokoyama
- (Japan) Koji Yoshimoto
- (Japan) Nadaka Yoshinari
- (Japan) Yuki Yoza
- (Japan) Yuki
- (Netherlands) Gilbert Yvel

== Z ==
- (Czech Republic) Jiri Zak
- (Sudan) Faisal Zakaria
- (Greece) Mike Zambidis
- (Brazil) Danilo Zanolini
- (China) Deng Zeqi
- (Egypt) Amir Zeyada
- (China) Yang Zhuo
- (Ukraine) Pavel Zhuravlev
- (Russia) Aslanbek Zikreev
- (Netherlands) Errol Zimmerman
- (Serbia) Stevan Živković
- (Romania) Cătălin Zmărăndescu
- (Croatia) Emil Zoraj
- (Morocco) Zakaria Zouggary
- (Angola) Henriques Zowa
- (Belarus) Dzianis Zuev

== See also ==
- List of female kickboxers
- List of Muay Thai practitioners
- List of Lethwei fighters
