= Kickboxing at the 2017 World Games – Men's heavyweight =

Kickboxing - Men's heavyweight at the 2017 World Games
- Venue: Orbita Hall, Wrocław, Poland
- Dates: 26–27 July 2017
- Competitors: 8 from 8 nations

Medalists
| gold medal | (Russia) Igor Darmeshkin |
| silver medal | (Poland) Mateusz Pluta |
| bronze medal | (Moldova) Pavel Voronin |

The men's heavyweight competition in kickboxing at the 2017 World Games took place from 26 to 27 July 2017 at the Orbita Hall in Wrocław, Poland.

== Competition format ==
A total of 8 athletes entered the competition. They fought in the cup system.

== Results ==
Quarterfinals
(Morocco) Tawfik El Yacoubi | 0
(Moldova) Pavel Voronin | 3
(Poland) Mateusz Pluta | 3
(Czech Republic) Petr Kares | 0
(Croatia) Ivan Stanić | 0
(Russia) Igor Darmeshkin | 3
(Canada) Scott Bartlett | 0
(Brazil) Willer Alves | 3

Semifinals
(Moldova) Pavel Voronin
(Poland) Mateusz Pluta | RSC
(Russia) Igor Darmeshkin | 2
(Brazil) Willer Alves | 1

Final
(Poland) Mateusz Pluta | 0
(Russia) Igor Darmeshkin | 3

| Third place |
| (Moldova) Pavel Voronin | 2 |
| (Brazil) Willer Alves | 1 |
