= Anaëlle Angerville =

French kickboxer

- Born: August 5, 1989 (age 37); Lyon, France
- Other names: The Haitian Gwad
- Nationality: French
- Height: 167 cm (5 ft 6 in)
- Weight: 57 kg (126 lb; 9.0 st)
- Style: Kickboxing, Muay Thai
- Stance: Orthodox
- Fighting out of: Lyon, France
- Team: Team Lions Thaïs
- Trainer: Dominique Poulet
- Years active: 2014–present

Professional boxing record
- Total: 10
- Wins: 6
- By knockout: 1
- Losses: 3
- Draws: 1

Kickboxing record
- Total: 27
- Wins: 19
- By knockout: 3
- Losses: 5
- By knockout: 0
- Draws: 3

Other information
- Boxing record from BoxRec

Anaëlle Angerville (born August 5, 1989) is a French muay thai kickboxer. A professional competitor since 2014, she is the 2022 WMC World −57 kg champion.

== Muay thai and kickboxing career ==
After going to a draw with Dehby, Angerville faced Emma Gongora at Divonne Muaythai Challenge 4 on March 16, 2019. She won the fight by decision. Angerville faced Marine Lefebvre for the FFKMDA −57.1 kg title at Le Choc Des Best Fighters 4 on April 6, 2019. She won her second professional title by decision. Angerville next faced Amel Dehby at Master Fight on May 18, 2019. She won the fight by decision.

Angerville made he Glory debut against Mario Lobo at Glory 70 on October 26, 2019. She won the fight by unanimous decision.

Angerville was booked to face Rebekah Irwin for the vacant WMC World −57 kg title at Muaythai Night 6 on August 11, 2022, following a three-year long absence from the sport. She captured her first major title by decision.

Angerville faced Laura de Blas at Riviera Fight on December 1, 2022. The fight was ruled a draw after the five rounds were contested. On December 29, 2022, Angerville announced that she had left the French national amateur muay thai team, to focus on professional competition.

Angerville faced the Enfusion Flyweight champion Nina Van Dalum in a non-title bout at Fight Night One 15 on April 29, 2023. She won the fight by decision.

Angerville faced Débora Évora at Choc Des Etoiles 7 on May 13, 2023. The fight ended in a decision draw.

== Professional boxing career ==
Angerville made her professional boxing debut against Odelia Ben Ephraim on April 3, 2021. She won the fight on points, with a 39–37 scorecard. Her next bout took place just 15 days later, as she faced Daniela Panait on April 18. The fight was ruled a draw by technical decision. Angerville faced the unbeaten Amina Zidani for the Federation Francaise de Boxe France super featherweight title on July 24, 2021. She lost the fight by split decision. Two of the judges scored the bout 77–76 and 78–74 for Zidani, while the third judge awarded Angerville a 77–75 scorecard.

Angerville faced the undefeated Amy Naert on April 30, 2022. She won the fight by majority decision, with two judges awarding her all six rounds of the bout, while the third judge scored had the fight scored as a 57–57 draw. Angerville faced her third unbeaten opponent on May 14, 2022, as she was booked to face Tijana Draskovic. She won the fight by unanimous decision, with three scorecards of 60–54. Angerville faced Eva Cantos on December 15, 2022, in her third and final boxing appearance of the year. She won the fight by unanimous decision.

Angerville faced Odelia Ben Ephraim for the vacant Federation Francaise de Boxe France featherweight title on February 4, 2023. She won the fight by split decision. Two of the judges scored the fight 78–74 and 79–73 in her favor, while the third judge awarded Ben Ephraim a 77–75 scorecard. Angerville next faced the undefeated Caroline Veyre on March 17, 2023. She lost the fight by unanimous decision.

Angerville challenged Sheila Martinez for the EBU Female Featherweight title on January 27, 2024. She lost the fight by unanimous decision, with scores of 99–90, 99–91 and 98–92.

== Championships and accomplishments ==
Professional

- Académie Française de Muay Thaï
  - 2015 AFMT National −57 kg Championship
- Fédération Française de Kickboxing, Muaythai et Disciplines Associées
  - 2019 FFKMDA −61.2 kg Championship
- World Muaythai Council
  - 2022 WMC World −57 kg Championship

Amateur

- International Federation of Muaythai Associations
  - 2016 IFMA European Championships −60 kg (bronze)
  - 2016 IFMA Royal World Cup in Kazan −60 kg (silver)
  - 2018 IFMA World Championships −57 kg (silver)
  - 2018 IFMA European Championships −57 kg (gold)
  - 2019 IFMA Arafura Games −57 kg (gold)
  - 2019 IFMA World Championships −57 kg (silver)
  - 2021 IFMA World Championships −57 kg (silver)

== Fight record ==
Professional Muay Thai & Kickboxing record
19 Wins (3 (T)KO's), 5 Losses, 3 Draws, 0 No Contest
Date	Result	Opponent	Event	Location	Method	Round	Time
2023-05-13	Draw	(Portugal) Débora Évora	Choc Des Etoiles 7	Châteauneuf-les-Martigues, France	Decision	3	3:00
2023-04-29	Win	(Netherlands) Nina van Dalum	Fight Night One 14	Saint-Étienne, France	Decision	3	3:00
2022-12-01	Draw	(Spain) Laura de Blas	Riviera Fight	Puget-sur-Argens, France	Decision	5	3:00
2022-02-26	Win	(United States) Rebekah Irwin	Muaythai Night 6	Dubai, United Arab Emirates	Decision	5	3:00
Won the vacant WMC World −57 kg title.
2019-10-26	Win	(Portugal) Maria Lobo	Glory 70: Lyon	Lyon, France	Decision (Unanimous)	3	3:00
2019-05-18	Win	(France) Amel Dehby	Master Fight	Chalon-sur-Saône, France	Decision	3	3:00
2019-04-06	Win	(France) Marine Lefevbre	Le Choc Des Best Fighters 4	Asnières-sur-Seine, France	Decision	5	3:00
2019-03-16	Win	(France) Emma Gongora	Divonne Muaythai Challenge 4	Divonne-les-Bains, France	Decision	3	3:00
2019-02-23	Draw	(France) Amel Dehby	Stars Night	Vitrolles, France	Decision	3	3:00
2018-12-01	Win	(France) Marine Lefevbre	Night Of Si'Fight 1	Troyes, France	Decision	5	3:00
2018-10-20	Win	(China) Yang Yang	Glory of Heroes 36: Ziyang	Sichuan, China	Decision (Unanimous)	3	3:00
2018-10-06	Loss	(United Kingdom) Christi Brereton	Roar Combat League 10	London, England	Decision	5	3:00
2018-04-97	Loss	(Algeria) Nora Cornolle	Finales Championnat De France Pro	Saint Ouen, France	Decision (Split)	5	3:00
For the FFKMDA National −61.2 kg title.
2018-02-10	Loss	(Algeria) Nora Cornolle	The Diamond II	Drancy, France	Decision	5	3:00
2017-12-02	Win	(Spain) Eulalia Palaez	La 13ème Nuit Du Muay Thai	Saint-Pryvé-Saint-Mesmin, France	Decision (Unanimous)	3	3:00
2017-04-01	Loss	(Algeria) Nora Cornolle	Konateam Tournament	Villiers-sur-Marne, France	Decision	5	3:00
2017-02-18	Win	(Italy) Anna Grande	Apash Tournament	Vaulx-en-Velin, France	TKO (Retirement)	2	3:00
2016-06-11	Loss	(United Kingdom) Bernise Alldis	Muay Thai Grand Prix 5	London, England	Decision (Unanimous)	5	3:00
2016-05-28	Win	(Italy) Sandy Manfrotto	LFC 6	Villeurbanne, France	Decision	5	3:00
2016-05-07	Win	(France) Florence Delaroche	Trophée Somsong/Joe Prestia	Saint-Gilles, Gard, France	TKO	2	
2016-04-09	Win	(France) Jennifer Colomb	Golden Fight 4, Tournament Final	La Courneuve, France	Decision	5	3:00
Won the Golden Fight −57 kg tournament title.
2016-04-09	Win	(Portugal) Maria Lobo	Golden Fight 4, Tournament Semi-final	La Courneuve, France	Decision	5	3:00
2015-10-24	Win	(France) Morgan Fichet-Delavault	Gala de Boxe Thaï	Cesson-Sévigné, France	Decision	5	3:00
2015-02-21	Win	(France) Malika Machtoune	Gladiators Battle	Montluçon, France	TKO	1	
Won the AFMT −57 kg title.
2015-02-07	Win	(France) Morgan Fichet-Delavault	Palacio Fight Night	Ivry-sur-Seine, France	Decision	5	3:00
2015-02-07	Win	(Cambodia) Vi Srey Khouch	Gala International Boxe Cambodgienne	Chambéry, France	Decision	3	3:00
Legend: Win Loss Draw/No contest Notes

Amateur Muay Thai Record
30 Wins (7 (T)KOs), 8 Losses, 0 Draws
Date	Result	Opponent	Event	Location	Method	Round	Time
2022-07-15	Loss	(Sweden) Patricia Axling	2022 World Games, Tournament Quarterfinal	Birmingham, Alabama, U.S.	Decision (Unanimous)	3	3:00
2021-12-11	Loss	(United Kingdom) Iman Barlow	2021 IFMA World Championships, Tournament Final	Kuala Lumpur, Malaysia	Decision (Unanimous)	3	3:00
Won the 2021 IFMA World Championships (−57 kg) Silver Medal.
2021-12-10	Win	(Ukraine) Alina Martyniuk	2021 IFMA World Championships, Tournament Semi-final	Kuala Lumpur, Malaysia	Decision (Unanimous)	3	3:00
2021-12-07	Win	(Brazil) Graziele da Silva	2021 IFMA World Championships, Tournament Quarterfinal	Kuala Lumpur, Malaysia	Decision (Unanimous)	3	3:00
2019-07-28	Loss	(Russia) Maria Klimova	2019 IFMA World Championships, Tournament Final	Bangkok, Thailand	Decision (Unanimous)	3	3:00
Won the 2019 IFMA World Championships (−57 kg) Silver Medal.
2019-07-27	Win	(Canada) Taylor McClatchie	2019 IFMA World Championships, Tournament Semi-final	Bangkok, Thailand	Decision (Unanimous)	3	3:00
2019-07-25	Win	(Ukraine) Viktoriia Korkoshko	2019 IFMA World Championships, Tournament Quarterfinal	Bangkok, Thailand	Decision (Unanimous)	3	3:00
2019-07-22	Win	(Austria) Nina Scheucher	2019 IFMA World Championships, Tournament Opening Round	Bangkok, Thailand	Decision (Unanimous)	3	3:00
2019-06-16	Win	(Russia) Kristina Sandrkina	24th Bestfighter World Cup, Tournament Final	Rimini, Italy	Decision	3	2:00
Won the 2019 Bestfighter World Cup (−56 kg) Gold Medal.
2019-06-14	Win	(Russia) Natalia Babintseva	24th Bestfighter World Cup, Tournament Semi-final	Rimini, Italy	Decision	3	2:00
2019-05-01	Win	(Australia) Rebecca Rooney	2019 IFMA Arafura Games, Tournament Final	Darwin, Northern Territory, Australia	Decision (Unanimous)	3	3:00
Won the 2019 IFMA Arafura Games (−57 kg) Gold Medal.
2019-04-30	Win	(Ukraine) Viktoriia Ivanets	2019 IFMA Arafura Games, Tournament Semi-final	Darwin, Northern Territory, Australia	Decision (Unanimous)	3	3:00
2019-04-28	Win	(Austria) Nina Scheucher	2019 IFMA Arafura Games, Tournament Quarterfinal	Darwin, Northern Territory, Australia	Decision (Unanimous)	3	3:00
2018-07-07	Win	(Ukraine) Viktoriia Ivanets	2018 IFMA European Championships, Tournament Final	Prague, Czech Republic	Decision (Unanimous)	3	3:00
Won the 2018 IFMA European Championships (−57 kg) Gold Medal.
2018-07-04	Win	(Russia) Natalya Dyachkova	2018 IFMA European Championships, Tournament Semi-final	Prague, Czech Republic	Decision (Unanimous)	3	3:00
2018-07-02	Win	(Sweden) Evelina Wikner	2018 IFMA European Championships, Tournament Quarterfinal	Prague, Czech Republic	Decision (Unanimous)	3	3:00
2018-05-18	Loss	(Italy) Martine Michieletto	2018 IFMA World Championships, Tournament Final	Cancun, Mexico	Decision (Unanimous)	3	3:00
Won the 2018 IFMA European Championships (−57 kg) Silver Medal.
2018-05-16	Win	(Russia) Maria Klimova	2018 IFMA World Championships, Tournament Semi-final	Cancun, Mexico	Decision (Unanimous)	3	3:00
2018-05-14	Win	(Ukraine) Viktoriia Ivanets	2018 IFMA World Championships, Tournament Quarterfinal	Cancun, Mexico	Decision (Unanimous)	3	3:00
2018-05-13	Win	(United States) Erin Jimenez	2018 IFMA World Championships, Tournament Opening Round	Cancun, Mexico	Decision (Unanimous)	3	3:00
2018-05-07	Loss	(Finland) Gia Winberg	2017 IFMA World Championships, Tournament Quarterfinals	Minsk, Belarus	Decision (29:28)	3	3:00
2017-11-06	Loss	(Sweden) Zina Djelassi	2017 WAKO World Championships, K-1 Tournament Quarterfinal	Budapest, Hungary	Decision	3	2:00
2017-11-04	Win	(Belarus) Puchenia Yulya	2017 WAKO World Championships, K-1 Tournament Opening Round	Budapest, Hungary	Decision	3	2:00
2017-05-05	Win	(Canada) Olivia Loth	2017 IFMA World Championships, Tournament Opening Round	Minsk, Belarus	TKO	1	
2016-11-26	Loss	(Israel) Nili Block	IFMA World Cup 2016 in Kazan, Final	Kazan, Russia	Decision	3	3:00
Wins the 2016 IFMA World Cup in Kazan −60kg Silver Medal.
2016-11-24	Win	(Iran) Saeedeh Ghaffari	IFMA World Cup 2016 in Kazan, Semi-finals	Kazan, Russia	Decision	3	3:00
2016-11-22	Win	(Czech Republic) Tereza Dvorakova	IFMA World Cup 2016 in Kazan, Quarter Finals	Kazan, Russia	Decision	3	3:00
2016-10-27	Loss	(Belarus) Mariya Valent	IFMA European Championships, Tournament Semi-finals	Split, Croatia	Decision	3	3:00
Wins the 2016 IFMA European Championships −60kg Silver Medal.
2016-10-23	Win	(Czech Republic) Tereza Dvorakova	IFMA European Championships, Tournament	Split, Croatia	Decision	3	3:00
Legend: Win Loss Draw/No contest Notes

== Professional boxing record ==
11 fights	7 wins	3 losses
By knockout	1	0
By decision	6	3
Draws	1	

No.	Result	Record	Opponent	Type	Round, time	Date	Location	Notes
11	Win	7–3–1	Yaiza Souto	UD	4	Feb 24, 2024	Gymnase du Port Marchand, Toulon, France	
10	Loss	6–3–1	Sheila Martinez	UD	10	Jan 27, 2024	Pabellón Ginés Alenda, San Vicente del Raspeig, Spain	For EBU Female Featherweight title.
9	Win	6–2–1	Tijana Drašković	TKO	4	Dec 12, 2023	Salle COSEC, Feyzin, France	
8	Loss	5–2–1	Caroline Veyre	UD	6	Mar 16, 2023	Place Bell, Laval, Canada	
7	Win	5–1–1	Odelia Ben Ephraim	SD	8	Feb 4, 2023	Salle Les Iris, Lormont, France	Won vacant Federation Francaise de Boxe France featherweight title
6	Win	4–1–1	Eva Cantos	UD	6	Dec 15, 2022	La Masorelle, Saint-Priest, France	
5	Win	3–1–1	Tijana Draskovic	UD	6	May 14, 2022	Maison des Sports, Clermont-Ferrand, France	
4	Win	2–1–1	Amy Naert	MD	6	Apr 30, 2022	Ingelmunster, Belgium	
3	Loss	1–1–1	Amina Zidani	SD	8	Jul 24, 2021	Arenes du Cap d'Agde, Agde, France	For Federation Francaise de Boxe France super featherweight title
2	Draw	1–0–1	Daniela Panait	TD	6	Apr 18, 2021	Rivarolo Canavese, Italy	
1	Win	1–0	Odelia Ben Ephraim	PTS	4	Apr 3, 2021	Palais des sports Jean Capievic, Vaulx-en-Velin, France	

== See also ==
- List of female kickboxers
