= Amel Dehby =

French kickboxer

- Born: June 15, 1991 (age 35); Nice, France
- Other names: Huch Huch
- Nationality: French
- Height: 5 ft 6 in (1.68 m)
- Weight: 122 lb (55 kg; 8.7 st)
- Division: Super Bantamweight; Featherweight; Super Featherweight
- Style: Muay Thai
- Fighting out of: Saint-Raphaël, Var, France
- Team: AJSR Saint Raphaël
- Years active: 2010 - present

Kickboxing record
- Total: 47
- Wins: 40
- By knockout: 9
- Losses: 6
- Draws: 1

Amel Dehby (born June 15, 1991) is a French professional kickboxer and winner of the World Kickboxing Network title.

In 2016, Dehby was defeated by Tiffany van Soest for the Glory Women's Bantamweight title.

She is the former two time WKN K1 World Champion and one time International Champion at Super Featherweight, the former ISKA K1 World Lightweight Champion, the former Nuit Des Champions Bantamweight Champion and the Urban Boxing United Tournament Champion.

== Kickboxing career ==
Amel Dehby made her kickboxing debut in 2010 against Irina Mazepa, winning a unanimous decision.

In 2012 Dehby fought Bernise Alldis for the ISKA Lightweight World K1 title. Dehby won a unanimous decision.

In her next fight, Dehby fought for the WKN World Super Featherweight title. She won a unanimous decision.

In 2013 she participated in the Urban Boxing United four woman tournament. After Paola Cappucci in the semi-finals, she won a unanimous decision against Maria Pantazi in the finals.

She participated in the Global Boxing Council eight woman tournament in 2015. Dehby defeated Lucie Mudrochova in semis and Stephanie Ielö Page in the finals to win the tournament.

In her next fight she won a unanimous decision against Veronica Vernocchi to win the WKN International Super Featherweight Title.

In 2016 Dehby participated in the Glory Super Bantamweight Grand Prix. She won a decision against Jiwaen Lee in the semi-finals, during GLORY 35. During GLORY 36: Collision she won a decision against Isis Verbeek. In the finals she faced Tiffany van Soest. Dehby lost a unanimous decision.

Dehby was given a chance to fight Anissa Meksen for the Women's Bantamweight title during Glory 53. Dehby failed to capture the title, losing a unanimous decision.

== Championships and accomplishments ==
- World Kickboxing Network
  - WKN World K1 Super Featherweight Championship (Two time)
  - WKN International K1 Super Featherweight Championship
- International Sport Karate Association
  - ISKA K1 World Lightweight Championship
- Nuit Des Champions
  - NDC Bantamweight World Championship
- Urban Boxing United
  - Urban Boxing United Tournament Champion
- Global Boxing Council
  - World GBC Tour 8 Tournament Champion

== Kickboxing record ==
Kickboxing record
40 wins (9 KOs), 6 losses, 1 draw
Date	Result	Opponent	Event	Location	Method	Round	Time
8 Feb 2020	Loss	(France) Stephanie Ielö Page	Empire Fight	Montbéliard, France	Decision (Split)	3	3:00
14 Sep 2019	Win	(Belgium) Kelly Danioko	Battle Of Saint-Raphael 7	Saint-Raphaël, France	Decision (Unanimous)	3	3:00
20 Jul 2019	Win	(Turkey) Irem Akin	Le Choc Des Gladiateurs	Le Lavandou, France	Decision (Unanimous)	3	3:00
18 May 2019	Loss	(France) Anaëlle Angerville	Master Fight	Chalon-sur-Saône, France	Decision (Unanimous)	3	3:00
30 Mar 2019	Loss	(France) Naoil Tita	The Diamond 3	Drancy, France	Decision (Unanimous)	3	3:00
23 Feb 2019	Draw	(France) Anaëlle Angerville	Stars Night	Vitrolles, France	Decision (Unanimous)	3	3:00
19 Jan 2019	Win	(Italy) Vittoria Di Mauro	Menton Boxing Stars	Menton, France	Decision (Unanimous)	3	3:00
22 Sep 2018	Loss	(Netherlands) Jorina Baars	World Fighting League	Almere, Netherlands	KO	3	
15 Sep 2018	Win	(Netherlands) Ruby Mssu	Battle Of Saint-Raphael 6	Saint-Raphaël, France	Decision (Unanimous)	3	3:00
12 May 2018	Loss	(Algeria) Anissa Meksen	Glory 53	Lille, France	Decision (Unanimous)	5	3:00
For the Women's Bantamweight title.
17 Mar 2018	Win	(Netherlands) Ilona Wijmans	La Nuit Des Titans	Tours, France	Decision (Unanimous)	3	3:00
13 Jan 2018	Win	(France) Lizzie Largillière	Nuit Des Gladiateurs 9	Marseille, France	Decision (Unanimous)	3	3:00
9 Sep 2017	Win	(England) Cathy McAleer	Battle Of Saint-Raphael	Saint-Raphaël, France	Decision (Unanimous)	3	3:00
10 Dec 2016	Loss	(United States) Tiffany van Soest	GLORY 36: Collision	Oberhausen, Germany	Decision (Unanimous)	3	3:00
Glory Super Bantamweight Grand Prix Finals.
10 Dec 2016	Win	(Netherlands) Isis Verbeek	GLORY 36: Collision	Oberhausen, Germany	Decision (Unanimous)	3	3:00
Glory Super Bantamweight Grand Prix Semi-finals.
5 Nov 2016	Win	(South Korea) Jiwaen Lee	GLORY 35	Nice, France	Decision (Unanimous)	3	3:00
Glory Super Bantamweight Grand Prix Quarter-finals.
13 Feb 2016	Win	(Italy) Paola Cappucci	Stars Night	Vitrolles, France	Decision (Unanimous)	3	3:00
12 Sep 2015	Win	(Italy) Veronica Vernocchi	Battle of Saint-Raphael 3	Saint-Raphaël, France	Decision (Unanimous)	5	3:00
For the WKN International Super Featherweight Title.
7 Feb 2015	Win	(France) Stephanie Ielö Page	World GBC Tour 8	Pernes-les-Fontaines, France	Decision (Unanimous)	3	3:00
GBC Tournament Finals.
7 Feb 2015	Win	(Czech Republic) Lucie Mudrochova	World GBC Tour 8	Pernes-les-Fontaines, France	Decision (Unanimous)	3	3:00
GBC Tournament Semi-finals.
4 Oct 2014	Win	(Portugal) Marisa Pires	WKN/GBC K1	France	Decision (Unanimous)	3	3:00
5 Jun 2013	Win	(Spain) Marta Branas	The Battle of Saint-Raphael	Saint-Raphaël, France	KO	3	3:00
18 May 2013	Win	(Greece) Maria Pantazi	Urban Boxing United 2013	Marseille, France	Decision (Unanimous)	3	3:00
4-Fighter Tournament Final.
18 May 2013	Win	(Italy) Paola Cappucci	Urban Boxing United 2013	Marseille, France	Decision (Unanimous)	3	3:00
4-Fighter Tournament Semi-final.
24 Nov 2012	Win	(France) Fatima Adib	Nuit des Champions 2012	Marseille, France	Decision (Unanimous)	3	3:00
Nov 2012	Win	(Greece) Maria Pantazi	WKN World Title	St. Raphael, France	Decision (Unanimous)	5	3:00
For the WKN Super Featherweight Title.
19 May 2012	Win	(England) Bernise Alldis	Urban Boxing United 2012	Marseille, France	Decision (Unanimous)	5	3:00
For the ISKA World Lightweight Title.
1 Oct 2011	Win	(France) Priscilia Marquez	F-1 World Max Tournament 2011	Meyreuil, France	Decision (Unanimous)	3	3:00
19 Jun 2011	Win	(Italy) Luisella Maccione	Grand Gala De Boxe	Grasse, France	Decision (Unanimous)	3	3:00
2 Apr 2011	Win	(France) Houria Laalioui	1/2 Finales Championnat De France Kick Boxing	Strasbourg, France	Decision (Unanimous)	3	3:00
26 Feb 2011	Win	(France) Valérie Domergue	Championnat de France de Kick Boxing	Paris, France	Decision (Unanimous)	3	3:00
16 Jul 2010	Win	(Russia) Irina Mazepa	All Stars	Saint-Raphaël, France	Decision (Unanimous)	3	3:00
Legend: Win Loss Draw/No contest Notes

== See also ==
List of female kickboxers
