= Andrew Thomson (kickboxer) =

South African kickboxer (born 1974)

- Born: 7 April 1974 (age 52); East London, South Africa
- Other names: Iceberg
- Nationality: (South Africa) South African
- Height: 1.98 m (6 ft 6 in)
- Weight: 110 kg (240 lb; 17 st)
- Division: Heavyweight
- Style: Kickboxing, Karate, Muay Thai
- Team: Steve's Gym

Kickboxing record
- Total: 38
- Wins: 30
- By knockout: 30
- Losses: 8
- By knockout: 8

Andrew "Iceberg" Thomson, (born 7 April 1974), is a retired South African kickboxer.

== Biography and career ==
Thompson was born in East London, South Africa in 1974. Although he played several sports when he was a young boy, he was most interested in body building and martial arts. He studied karate, kickboxing, Muay Thai, kung fu, and boxing.

After graduation he was conscripted into the South African army, where he qualified as a parachutist and a sanitation engineer.

After he moved from East London to Cape Town, he joined Steve's Gym, and he participated in K-1 from 1998 to 2003. He won several K-1 events.

He competed in Enfusion Kickboxing Tournament '13 where he defeated Mate Paulovics on 12 September 2013 in tournament's 1st round. He won by 1st-round TKO after 1 min. and 32 sec and withdraw from the tournament.

== Titles ==
- 1999 South African Super Heavyweight Muay Thai Champion
- 2000 K-1 Africa Grand Prix winner
- 2001 K-1 Africa Grand Prix winner
- 2002 K-1 Africa Grand Prix winner
- 2006 King of the Ring Pro Heavyweight World Title Runner Up

== Professional kickboxing record ==
Kickboxing Record
30 Wins (30 (T)KO's), 8 Losses
Date	Result	Opponent	Event	Location	Method	Round	Time
2015-12-19	Loss	(Morocco) Ismael Lazaar	Enfusion Live 35	Antwerp, Belgium	KO	1	
For The Enfusion Live Super Heavyweight +95 kg title.
2013-09-12	Win	(Hungary) Mate Paulovics	Enfusion 4: Search for the SuperPro, First Round	Ko Samui, Thailand	TKO	1	1:32
2002-08-17	Loss	(Netherlands) Errol Parris	K-1 World Grand Prix 2002 in Las Vegas, quarter finals	Las Vegas, United States	KO	1	2:59
2001-06-08	Win	(South Africa) Timmelo Maputha	K-1 World Grand Prix 2002 Preliminary South Africa, final	Pretoria, South Africa	KO	2	2:00
Wins K-1 Africa Grand Prix 2002 title.
2001-06-08	Win	(South Africa) Hannes Vandenberg	K-1 World Grand Prix 2002 Preliminary South Africa, semi finals	Pretoria, South Africa	KO (Punch)	1	1:50
2001-06-08	Win	(South Africa) George Hlatswayo	K-1 World Grand Prix 2002 Preliminary South Africa, quarter finals	Pretoria, South Africa	KO (Punch)	1	
2001-07-20	Loss	(Belarus) Alexey Ignashov	K-1 World Grand Prix 2001 in Nagoya, semi finals	Nagoya, Japan	KO (Left Punch)	1	1:46
2001-07-20	Win	(France) Cyril Abidi	K-1 World Grand Prix 2001 in Nagoya, quarter finals	Nagoya, Japan	TKO (Referee stoppage)	1	1:15
2001-06-08	Win	(South Africa) Paul Rothman	K-1 World Grand Prix 2001 Preliminary South Africa, final	Cape Town, South Africa	TKO	3	0:49
Wins K-1 Africa Grand Prix 2001 title.
2001-06-08	Win	(Republic of the Congo) Billy Kongolo	K-1 World Grand Prix 2001 Preliminary South Africa, semi finals	Cape Town, South Africa	KO	1	1:22
2001-06-08	Win	(Namibia) Martin Roodman	K-1 World Grand Prix 2001 Preliminary South Africa, quarter finals	Cape Town, South Africa	KO	1	1:43
2000-10-09	Loss	(South Africa) Mike Bernardo	K-1 World Grand Prix 2000 in Fukuoka Semi Finals	Fukuoka, Japan	TKO (Doctor Stoppage)	1	0:34
Andrew Thomson replaced Stefan Leko in the Semi Final as Stefan Leko was unable to continue due to injury.
2000-10-09	Loss	(Germany) Stefan Leko	K-1 World Grand Prix 2000 in Fukuoka	Fukuoka, Japan	KO (Right low kick)	2	1:50
2000-09-03	Win	(South Africa) Donovan Luff	K-1 Africa Grand Prix 2000, final	Cape Town, South Africa	KO	3	0:16
Wins K-1 Africa Grand Prix 2000 title.
2000-09-03	Win	(Nigeria) George Igobi	K-1 Africa Grand Prix 2000, semi finals	Cape Town, South Africa	KO	1	1:05
2000-09-03	Win	(Uganda) Mwa George	K-1 Africa Grand Prix 2000, quarter finals	Cape Town, South Africa	TKO (Corner Stoppage)	1	3:00
2000-05-12	Loss	(Netherlands) Peter Aerts	K-1 King of the Ring 2000	Bologna, Italy	KO	1	0:55
1999-02-03	Loss	(Japan) Takeru	K-1 Rising Sun '99	Tokyo, Japan	KO (knee)	3	1:20
1998-08-28	Loss	(South Africa) Mike Bernardo	K-1 Japan Grand Prix '98	Tokyo, Japan	TKO (Referee Stoppage, Right Straight)	1	3:03
Legend: Win Loss Draw/No contest Notes

== See also ==
- List of male kickboxers
- Muay Thai
