= Bernise Alldis =

English kickboxer

- Born: 8 December 1987 (age 38); Orpington, England
- Nationality: English
- Height: 1.70 m (5 ft 7 in)
- Weight: 56.7 kg (125 lb; 8 st 13 lb)
- Division: Bantamweight (kickboxing); Flyweight (MMA)
- Style: Kickboxing
- Stance: Orthodox
- Fighting out of: Orpington, England
- Team: Keddles Gym
- Trainer: Alan Keddle
- Years active: 2003 - present

Kickboxing record
- Total: 42
- Wins: 38
- By knockout: 1
- Losses: 4

Mixed martial arts record
- Total: 3
- Wins: 3
- By knockout: 3

Other information
- Occupation: Personal trainer at Keddles Gym
- Boxing record from BoxRec
- Mixed martial arts record from Sherdog

Bernise Alldis (born 8 December 1987) is an English kickboxer and mixed martial artist who has been professionally competing since 2003.

She is the former WMC World Lightweight Champion, ISKA Muay Thai Featherweight World Champion, the former IKF Lightweight Muay Thai World Champion, Muay Thai Grand Prix Featherweight World Champion, and the Enfusion Season 1 Coach's Tournament winner.

Alldis made her transition to mixed martial arts in 2017.

== Martial arts career ==
In 2004, Alldis faced Julie Kitchen during Warriors III. Alldis won the match by unanimous decision.

Bernise Alldis fought Krista Fleming for the WFCA World title in 2007. Alldis lost a unanimous decision.

A year later, Alldis contested the fought Maria Verheijen for the WMC World Lightweight title. Alldis won the title by unanimous decision.

In 2010, Alldis contested the ISKA World K1 Lightweight title, against Luisella Maccione. She won by unanimous decision.

In that same year Bernise Alldis participated in the Enfusion Season 1 Coach's Tournament. She beat Eva Berben in the semi-finals, and Titiana van Polanen Petel in the finals to become the tournament winner.

Alldis faced Séverine Guilpin during Romford Fight Night 2011 for the IKF World Lightweight title. Alldis won the title by unanimous decision.

Alldis was scheduled to defend her ISKA World title against Amel Dehby during Urban Boxing United 2012. Alldis lost a unanimous decision.

During Lion Fight 22 Alldis fought against Tiffany van Soest, for the Lion Fight Featherweight title. In the fourth round of the fight Alldis was badly cut, and the ringside doctor stopped the fight. Van Soeast won by TKO.

Alldis' next kickboxing bout came in 2016, when she fought Elna Nilsson, winning the fight by decision.

In November 2016 Alldis won a unanimous decision over Emily Wahby to become the WBC Muaythai World Featherweight champion.

Alldis faced Laura De Blas at Combat Fight Series 6 on November 6, 2021. She won the fight by unanimous decision.

== Mixed martial arts career ==
Alldis made her professional debut in 2018, during Fusion FC 27, against Evelina Puidaitė. She won the fight by TKO. Her second pro fight was during Fusion FC 28 against Diana Tavares. She won the fight by TKO. Her third fight was against Ana Maria Pal, during Fusion FC 29. She likewise won the fight by TKO.

== Championships and accomplishments ==
- World Full Contact Association
  - WFCA World Championship
- World Muaythai Council
  - WMC World Lightweight Championship
- International Sport Karate Association
  - ISKA Muay Thai Featherweight World Championship
- Enfusion
  - Enfusion Season 1 Coach's Tournament Winner
- International Kickboxing Federation
  - IKF Lightweight Muay Thai World Championship
- Muay Thai Grand Prix
  - MTGP Featherweight World Championship
- World Boxing Council Muaythai
  - WBC Muaythai World Featherweight Championship

== Muay thai record ==
Muay Thai record
38 Wins (1 (T)KO's), 4 Losses, 0 Draws, 0 No Contests
| Date | Result | Opponent | Event | Location | Method | Round | Time |
| 2021-11-06 | Win | (Netherlands) Laura De Blas | Combat Fight Series 6 | London, England | Decision (Unanimous) | 5 | 3:00 |
| 2016-11-19 | Win | (Italy) Emily Wahby | WBC Muaythai Copthorne | Copthorne, West Sussex, England | Decision (Unanimous) | 5 | 3:00 |
Wins the WBC Muaythai Featherweight World title.
| 2016-10-15 | Win | (England) Elna Nilsson | Muay Thai Grand Prix 6 | London, England | Decision (Unanimous) | 5 | 3:00 |
Wins the MTGP Featherweight World title.
| 2016-06-11 | Win | (France) Anaëlle Angerville | Muay Thai Grand Prix 5 | London, England | Decision (Unanimous) | 3 | 3:00 |
| 2015-05-22 | Loss | (United States) Tiffany van Soest | Lion Fight 22 | Henderson, Nevada, United States | TKO (Stoppage due to cut) | 4 | 1:44 |
For the Lion Fight Women's Featherweight (-56.7 kg/125 lb) Championship.
| 2015-03-21 | Win | (Wales) Tanya Merrett | Yokkao 13 | Bolton, England | Decision (Unanimous) | 3 | 3:00 |
| 2012-05-19 | Loss | (France) Amel Dehby | Urban Boxing United 2012 | Marseille, France | Decision (Unanimous) | 5 | 2:00 |
Loses the ISKA World K1 Lightweight title.
| 2011-03-19 | Win | (France) Séverine Guilpin | Romford Fight Night 2011 | Essex, England | Decision (Unanimous) | 5 | 2:00 |
For the IKF World Lightweight title.
| 2010-07-09 | Win | (Suriname) Titiana van Polanen Petel | Enfusion Season 1 Coach's Tournament | Lisbon, Portugal | Decision (Unanimous) | 3 | 3:00 |
| 2010-07-09 | Win | (Belgium) Eva Berben | Enfusion Season 1 Coach's Tournament | Lisbon, Portugal | Decision (Unanimous) | 3 | 3:00 |
| 2010-05-29 | Loss | (England) Anna Zucchelli | ExCel | London, England | Decision (Unanimous) | 5 | 2:00 |
| 2010-03-13 | Win | (Italy) Luisella Maccione | Kombat League | Essex, England | Decision (Unanimous) | 3 | 3:00 |
Wins the ISKA World K1 Lightweight title.
| 2009-12-05 | Win | (Netherlands) Lisanne Van Der Molen | Muay Thai Legends | Croydon, England | Decision (Unanimous) | 5 | 2:00 |
| 2009-05-24 | Win | (Belgium) Nathalie Visschers | Pain and Glory | London, England | Decision (Unanimous) | 3 | 3:00 |
| 2008-11-23 | Win | (Sweden) Mikaela Mélante | Capital Punishment | London, England | Decision (Unanimous) | 3 | 3:00 |
| 2008-08-16 | Win | (Netherlands) Maria Verheijen | Muay Thai Legends | London, England | Decision (Unanimous) | 5 | 3:00 |
Wins the WMC World Lightweight title.
| 2008-04-26 | Win | (France) Florence Delaroche | Pain and Glory | London, England | Decision (Unanimous) | 3 | 3:00 |
| 2007-11-11 | Loss | (Netherlands) Krista Fleming | Ax Kickboxing | Arnhem, Netherlands | Decision (Unanimous) | 5 | 3:00 |
For the WFCA World title.
| 2007-10 -07 | Win | (Belgium) Satya Maes | Warriors IX | Crawley, England | Decision (Unanimous) | 3 | 3:00 |
| 2007-04-28 | Win | (Scotland) Laura Craig | Gatwick | London, England | Decision (Unanimous) | 5 | 2:00 |
| 2004-10-03 | Win | (England) Julie Kitchen | Warriors III | Crawley, England | Decision (Unanimous) | 5 | 2:00 |
| 2004-08 | Win | (Czech Republic) Alena Holá | Women of Kickboxing | London, England | Decision (Unanimous) | 5 | 2:00 |
For the IMKO British Featherweight title.
| 2004-06-06 | Win | (England) Michelle Kellis | A Night in Bangkok II | Plymouth, England | Decision (Unanimous) | 5 | 2:00 |
| 2004-02 | Win | (England) Katie Proctor | | London, England | Decision | 5 | 2:00 |
Won the WPKL English title.
| 2003-08-23 | Win | (United Kingdom) Tanya Dady | | London, England | TKO (Retirement) | 2 | 2:00 |
| 2003-06-01 | Win | (United Kingdom) Lisa Beeley | | Guildford, England | Decision | 3 | 2:00 |
| 2003-03-26 | Win | (United Kingdom) Katie Proctor | Time for Deliverance | London, England | Decision | 3 | 2:00 |
| 2003 | Win | (United Kingdom) Rosie Hayward | | Crawley, England | Decision | 3 | 2:00 |
Won the UKMF title.
| 2003 | Win | (United Kingdom) Karen Lynch | | England | Decision | 3 | 2:00 |
| 2002 | Win | (United Kingdom) Layla Ferdum | | England | Decision | 3 | 2:00 |
Legend: Win Loss Draw/No contest Notes

== Mixed martial arts record ==
Professional record breakdown
| 3 matches | 3 wins | 0 losses |
| By knockout | 3 | 0 |

| Res. | Record | Opponent | Method | Event | Date | Round | Time | Location | Notes |
|---|---|---|---|---|---|---|---|---|---|
| Win | 3–0 | Ana Maria Pal | TKO (Punches) | Fusion FC 29 | 9 March 2019 | 1 | 2:54 | Surrey, England | |
| Win | 2–0 | Diana Tavares | TKO (Punches) | Fusion FC 28 | 27 October 2018 | 1 | 2:31 | Surrey, England | Strawweight bout |
| Win | 1–0 | Evelina Puidaitė | TKO (Punches) | Fusion FC 27 | 28 April 2018 | 2 | 2:18 | Surrey, England | Flyweight debut |

=== Amateur mixed martial arts record ===
| Amateur record breakdown | | |
| 2 matches | 2 wins | 0 losses |
| By knockout | 2 | 0 |

| Res. | Record | Opponent | Method | Event | Date | Round | Time | Location | Notes |
|---|---|---|---|---|---|---|---|---|---|
| Win | 2–0 | Megan Norman | TKO (Punches) | Fusion FC 25 | 16 September 2017 | 1 | 0:27 | Surrey, England | |
| Win | 1–0 | Indy Lynn | TKO (Punches) | Fusion FC 24 | 24 June 2017 | 2 | 2:12 | Surrey, England | |

== See also ==
- List of female kickboxers
