= Max Weekers =

Dutch kickboxer (born 1997)

- Born: April 3, 1997 (age 29); Weert, Netherlands
- Height: 1.90 m (6 ft 3 in)
- Weight: 85 kg (187 lb; 13.4 st)
- Stance: Orthodox
- Fighting out of: Weert, Netherlands
- Team: Team Heatubun/Team Alken
- Trainer: Yael Heatubun

Kickboxing record
- Total: 37
- Wins: 30
- By knockout: 11
- Losses: 5
- By knockout: 0
- Draws: 2

Max Weekers (born 3 April 1997) is a Dutch professional kickboxer.

As of June 2025, Weekers was the #10 ranked Middleweight kickboxer in the world by Combat Press and Beyond Kickboxing.

== Career ==
On November 9, 2021, Weekers defeated Jeroen Trjsburg by unanimous decision at a RINGS event in Nieuwegein, Netherlands.

Weekers made his A-class debut on September 24, 2022, against Anwar Dira at Enfusion 111–112 in Eindhoven, Netherlands. He won the fight by unanimous decision.

On February 11, 2023, Weekers faced Peter Verhaegh at Enfusion 118. He won the fight by unanimous decision.

On November 18, 2023, Weekers entered an 8-man one night tournament at Enfusion 129. He won the tournament defeating Thomas Doeve by third-round technical knockout in the quarterfinals, Aquille Richards by unanimous decision in the semifinals and Soufyan El Atiaoui by unaninmous decision in the final.

On March 2, 2024, Weekers faced Mauricio Cardoso for the vacant Big Game European Middleweight title. He won the fight by decision.

On November 11, 2024, Weekers faced Rodrigo Mineiro for the vacant Enfusion Middleweight title at Enfusion 143. He won the fight by fourth-round technical knockout.

On March 29, 2025, de Vries challenged Max Weekers for his Enfusion Middleweight World title at Enfusion 147. He won the fight by unanimous decision after five rounds.

== Championships and accomplishments ==
- Enfusion
  - 2024 Enfusion Middleweight (-84kg) World Champion
  - 2023 Glorious Fight Events ft. Enfusion Middleweight Tournament Winner
- Big Game
  - 2024 Big Game European Middleweight (-86 kg) Champion

== Kickboxing record ==
kickboxing record
30 Wins, 5 Losses, 2 Draws
Date	Result	Opponent	Event	Location	Method	Round	Time
2026-11-21		(Hungary) David Szabo-Toth	Fight Performance 6	Maasbracht, Netherlands			
2026-06-06	Loss	(Morocco) Anwar Dira	Enfusion #162	Genk, Belgium	Decision (Unanimous)	5	3:00
For the vacant Enfusion Middleweight World Championship.
2025-10-18	Win	(China) Bo Fufan	Road to Legend 6	Nagoya, Japan	Decision (Unanimous)	3	3:00
2025-03-29	Loss	(Netherlands) Thian de Vries	Enfusion #147	Goes, Netherlands	Decision (Unanimous)	5	3:00
Loses the Enfusion Middleweight World Championship.
2024-11-16	Win	(Brazil) Rodrigo Mineiro	Enfusion #143	Groningen, Netherlands	TKO (injury)	5	1:46
Wins the vacant Enfusion Middleweight World Championship.
2024-06-08	Win	(France) Aristote Quitusisa	Fight Performance Part III	Sittard, Netherlands	Decision (Unanimous)	3	3:00
2024-04-20	Win	(Netherlands) Piet van Den Berg	Enfusion 136	Alkmaar, Netherlands	Decision (Unanimous)	3	3:00
2024-03-02	Win	(Netherlands) Mauricio Cardoso	Big Game 6	Bochum, Germany	Decision	3	3:00
Wins the Big Game European Middleweight (-86kg) title.
2023-11-18	Win	(Morocco) Soufyan El Atiaoui	Enfusion 129, Final	Groningen, Netherlands	Decision (Unanimous)	3	3:00
Wins Glorious Fight Events ft. Enfusion Middleweight 8-Man Tournament.
2023-11-18	Win	(Netherlands) Aquille Richards	Enfusion 129, Semifinals	Groningen, Netherlands	Decision (Unanimous)	3	3:00
2023-11-18	Win	(Netherlands) Thomas Doeve	Enfusion 129, Quarterfinals	Groningen, Netherlands	TKO (2 Knockdowns)	3	1:50
2023-09-23	Win	(Cameroon) Brice Kombou	Fair FC 14	Duisburg, Germany	Decision (Unanimous)	3	3:00
2023-06-10	Win	(Turkey) Gurkan Basak	Fight Performance Part II	Echt, Netherlands	TKO	1	1:30
2023-02-11	Win	(Netherlands) Peter Verhaegh	Enfusion #118	Eindhoven, Netherlands	Decision (Unanimous)	3	3:00
2022-12-03	Win	(Cameroon) Brice Kombou	Fair FC 13	Recklinghausen, Germany	Decision (Unanimous)	3	3:00
2022-09-24	Win	(Morocco) Anwar Dira	Enfusion #111-112	Eindhoven, Netherlands	Decision (Unanimous)	3	3:00
A-class debut.
2021-10-09	Win	(Netherlands) Jeroen Trjsburg	RINGS	Nieuwegein, Netherlands	Decision (Unanimous)	3	3:00
2020-03-07	Win	(Morocco) Faris Acharradi	Dutch Combat Events 1	Landgraaf, Netherlands	Decision (Unanimous)	3	3:00
2019-12-20	Win	(Belgium) Sven Vandenboer	Kickboxing Sentowerfights	Opglabbeek, Belgium	Decision (Unanimous)	3	3:00
2019-06-29	Loss	(Belgium) Hamza Orh	Warriors Become Legends 2	Maastricht, Netherlands	Decision	3	3:00
2019-04-13	Win	(Belgium) Kenny Sagaert	Battle of the South	Heerlen, Netherlands	TKO	3	
Legend: Win Loss Draw/No contest Notes

== See also ==
- List of male kickboxers
