= Sahak Parparyan =

Armenian martial artist (born 1988)

- Born: September 4, 1988 (age 38); Armenian SSR, Soviet Union
- Other names: Hak
- Nationality: Armenian
- Height: 183 cm (6 ft 0 in)
- Weight: 85 kg (187 lb; 13.4 st)
- Division: Light Heavyweight; Cruiserweight; Heavyweight; Middleweight
- Reach: 72.0 in (183 cm)
- Style: Kickboxing, Muay Thai
- Stance: Orthodox
- Fighting out of: Alkmaar, Netherlands
- Team: Gym Alkmaar; Mike's Gym
- Trainer: Edwin van Os; Mike Passenier
- Years active: 2004–present

Kickboxing record
- Total: 61
- Wins: 42
- By knockout: 19
- Losses: 14
- By knockout: 1
- Draws: 5

Other information
- Last updated on: October 29, 2017

Sahak "Hak" Parparyan (Armenian: Սահակ Պարպարյան; born 4 September 1988) is an Armenian kickboxer, who is sometimes referred to as Sahak "Hak" Avetisyan. He’s a former It's Showtime 85MAX world champion and was ranked number one in the world during his title reign.

== Career ==
Sahak made his It's Showtime debut in 2006, winning a C-Klass bout by decision in his home town. In 2010, after almost exclusively fighting on the Dutch circuit, Sahak headed to Paris to face Abdarhmane Coulibaly for the W.P.M.F. European title, losing a decision to the home fighter after five rounds. In the same year, Sahak won the W.F.C.A. world title by KO'ing Yassin Boudrouz in the fourth round of their match in Belgium. In May 2011, Sahak faced Amir Zeyada for the It's Showtime 85MAX world title, vacated by Melvin Manhoef. After five rounds the Armenian was the new world champion, taking the belt by majority decision in what was one of the most exciting world title fights the organization has ever seen.

Parparyan made his first title defense against English-American Andrew Tate. He won the fight via unanimous decision 48–47, 49–46, 49–47, 48–47, and 49–48.

He defeated Jason Wilnis via decision at Iron Ring on September 15, 2012, in Alkmaar, Netherlands.

He was scheduled to defend his title against Alex Pereira at It's Showtime 60 in São Paulo, Brazil on November 10, 2012. However, he was forced to pull out of the fight due to visa issues and was replaced by former foe Jason Wilnis.

In late 2012, he competed on the third season of the Enfusion reality television show which culminated with a four-man tournament at Enfusion 3: Trial of the Gladiators on December 2, 2012, in Ljubljana, Slovenia where Parparyan lost to Franci Grajš by unanimous decision in the semi-finals.

Parparyan fought to a draw with César Córdoba at Enfusion Live: Barcelona in Barcelona, Spain on March 9, 2012. Córdoba was more dominant over the first two rounds, but Parparyan scored a knockdown with right overhand in the third and final round to earn himself a draw.

When Glory bought its showtime promotion Sahak was placed top 3 in the Glory rankings due to his achievements as he was considered the best 85 kg fighter during his title reign in its showtime.

He lost to Artem Levin via an extension round decision at Glory 7: Milan in Milan, Italy on April 20, 2013.

He was TKO'd in round one by eventual champion Pavel Zhuravlev in the semi-finals of the -93 kg/205 lb tournament at Legend 2: Invasion in Moscow, Russia on November 9, 2013. This was the first time that Parparyan was stopped in a fight.

He competed in the Glory 14: Zagreb - Middleweight Contendership Tournament in Zagreb, Croatia on March 8, 2014, beating Jason Wilnis by split decision in the semi-finals before losing to Alex Pereira by majority decision in the final.

When the leading ranking system combat press debuted, Sahak got placed #7 in the world at middleweight in 2014.

== Titles ==
- 2014 Glory Middleweight Contender Tournament Runner-up
- 2011 It's Showtime 85MAX World champion -85 kg / 1 Defense
- 2010 W.F.C.A. World champion -86.5 kg
- W.F.C.A. European champion -82.5 kg

== Kickboxing record(incomplete) ==
Kickboxing record
42 Wins(19 Finishes), 14 Losses(1 Finish), 5 Draws
| Date | Result | Opponent | Event | Location | Method | Round | Time |
| 2017-10-29 | Loss | (Romania) Andrei Stoica | WFL: Manhoef vs. Bonjasky, Final 16 | Almere, Netherlands | Decision (unanimous) | 3 | 3:00 |
| 2015-09-19 | Loss | (Estonia) Maxim Vorovski | Xplosion Fight Series | Tallinn, Estonia | Ext. R. Decision | 4 | 3:00 |
| 2015-05-16 | Loss | (Turkey) Ertugrul Bayrak | A1 World Combat Cup, Semi Finals | Eindhoven, Netherlands | Decision | 3 | 3:00 |
| 2015-05-16 | Win | (Afghanistan) Masoud Rahimi | A1 World Combat Cup, Quarter Finals | Eindhoven, Netherlands | Decision | 3 | 3:00 |
| 2014-03-08 | Loss | (Brazil) Alex Pereira | Glory 14: Zagreb - Middleweight Contender Tournament, Final | Zagreb, Croatia | Decision (majority) | 3 | 3:00 |
For the Glory Middleweight Contender Tournament.
| 2014-03-08 | Win | (Netherlands) Jason Wilnis | Glory 14: Zagreb - Middleweight Contender Tournament, Semi Finals | Zagreb, Croatia | Decision (split) | 3 | 3:00 |
| 2013-11-09 | Loss | (Ukraine) Pavel Zhuravlev | Legend 2: Invasion, Semi Finals | Moscow, Russia | TKO (punches) | 1 | N/A |
| 2013-04-20 | Loss | (Russia) Artem Levin | Glory 7: Milan | Milan, Italy | Extension round decision (unanimous) | 4 | 3:00 |
| 2013-03-09 | Draw | (Spain) César Córdoba | Enfusion Live: Barcelona | Barcelona, Spain | Decision draw | 3 | 3:00 |
| 2012-12-02 | Loss | (Slovenia) Franci Grajš | Enfusion 3: Trial of the Gladiators, Semi Finals | Ljubljana, Slovenia | Decision (unanimous) | 3 | 3:00 |
| 2012-09-15 | Win | (Netherlands) Jason Wilnis | Iron Ring | Alkmaar, Netherlands | Decision | 3 | 3:00 |
| 2012-05-12 | Win | (United States) Andrew Tate | It's Showtime 56 | Kortrijk, Belgium | Decision (unanimous) | 5 | 3:00 |
Retains It's Showtime 85MAX world title -85 kg.
| 2012-03-10 | Win | (Croatia) Toni Milanović | Cro Cop Final Fight | Zagreb, Croatia | Decision (unanimous) | 3 | 3:00 |
| 2012-01-28 | Win | (Tunisia) Mourad Bouzidi | It's Showtime 2012 in Leeuwarden | Leeuwarden, Netherlands | Decision (4–1) | 3 | 3:00 |
| 2012-01-14 | Win | (Turkey) Hakan Aksoy | Fightsensation II | Eindhoven, Netherlands | Decision | 3 | 3:00 |
| 2011-08-17 | Win | (United States) Eddie Walker | Enfusion 3: Trial of the Gladiators, Quarter Final | Ohrid, Macedonia | KO | 1 | 1:40 |
| 2011-08-12 | Win | (France) David Radeff | Enfusion 3: Trial of the Gladiators, First round | Ohrid, Macedonia | Decision | 3 | 3:00 |
| 2011-06-18 | Win | (Spain) Moises Ruibal | It's Showtime Madrid 2011 | Madrid, Spain | Decision (4–1) | 3 | 3:00 |
| 2011-05-21 | Win | (Egypt) Amir Zeyada | It's Showtime 2011 | Amsterdam, Netherlands | Decision (majority) | 5 | 3:00 |
Wins vacant It's Showtime 85MAX world title -85 kg.
| 2011-03-26 | Win | (Belgium) Marc Vlieger | BFN Group presents: It's Showtime Brussel | Brussels, Belgium | Decision (4–1) | 3 | 3:00 |
| 2011-01-20 | Loss | (Spain) Frank Muñoz | Enfusion 95 kg Tournament '11, 1st Round | Koh Samui, Thailand | Decision | 3 | 3:00 |
| 2010-10-29 | Loss | (France) Abdarhmane Coulibaly | France vs Lumpinee | Paris, France | Decision | 5 | 3:00 |
Fight was for W.P.M.F. Muaythai European title -91 kg.
| 2010-05-15 | Win | (Morocco) Yassin Boudrouz | Gala-A Marche-en-Famenne | Marche-en-Famenne, Belgium | KO | 4 | N/A |
Wins W.F.C.A. world title -86.5 kg.
| 2010-06-05 | Win | (Netherlands) Donald Berner | Uitslagen Kumite 11 | Hilversum, Netherlands | Decision | 5 | 3:00 |
| 2010-04-25 | Win | (Bosnia and Herzegovina) Asim Selimovic | Gala in Schermerhoorn | Schermerhorn, Netherlands | KO (punches) | 2 | N/A |
| 2009-10-02 | Win | (Brazil) Guillherm Almeida | Entertainment in the Ring | Netherlands | Decision | 3 | 3:00 |
| 2009-05-30 | Loss | (Netherlands) Romeo Almazidis | Bull's Gym Gala Putte | Putte, Netherlands | Decision | 5 | 3:00 |
| 2009-03-29 | Loss | (Morocco) Hicham El Gaoui | The Outland Rumble III | Rotterdam, Netherlands | Decision | 5 | 3:00 |
| 2008-09-06 | Loss | (Romania) Nicu Dascălu | It's Showtime 2008 Alkmaar | Alkmaar, Netherlands | Decision | 3 | 3:00 |
| 2008 | Win | (Netherlands) Donavon Lang | North Disturbed | Netherlands | Decision | 5 | 2:00 |
| 2007-12-22 | Loss | (Netherlands) Dave Meijer | Fight For Life | Amsterdam, Netherlands | Decision | 5 | N/A |
| 2006-12-02 | Win | (Netherlands) Van Brummel | It's Showtime 2006 | Alkmaar, Netherlands | Decision | 3 | 3:00 |
| 2005-09-18 | Loss | (Netherlands) Robin van Tongeren | Gala in Zilvermeeuwen | Zaandam, Netherlands | Decision | 3 | 2:00 |
| 2004-12-19 | Draw | (Netherlands) Michael Schrijver | Gala Landsmeer | Landsmeer, Netherlands | Decision | 2 | 1:30 |
Legend: Win Loss Draw/No contest Notes

== See also ==
- List of It's Showtime events
- List of It's Showtime champions
- List of male kickboxers
