= Franci Grajš =

Slovenian kickboxer

- Born: 15 December 1986 (age 39)
- Nationality: Slovene
- Height: 1.91 m (6 ft 3 in)
- Weight: 85 kg (187 lb; 13 st 5 lb)
- Division: Light Heavyweight
- Style: Muay Thai
- Team: Akademija Tajskega Boksa – Muay Thai Gym Scorpion (2004 – 201?); Nak Muay Gym
- Trainer: Iztok Vorkapic

Kickboxing record
- Total: 42
- Wins: 34
- By knockout: 14
- Losses: 8

Franci Grajš (born 15 December 1986) is a Slovene former kickboxer who was named best 85MAX kickboxer in 2012.

== Career ==
In August 2011, Grajš participated elimination kickboxing reality show called Enfusion: Trial of the Gladiators. 16 fighters went in Ohrid, Macedonia, lived, trained, and fought each other. In the first round Grajš defeated Michael Kongolo and then in the quarter-finals, he enrolled the biggest career win against veteran Wendell Roche. This victory qualified him for the final 4 tournaments that were held in his country Slovenia. Final 4 was held on 2 December 2012 in Ljubljana. In the semi-finals, Grajš faced It's showtime 85MAX champion and perhaps the best 85MAX fighter at that time Sahak Parparyan. Grajš won in a tough fight, he was more active in the first two rounds, Parparyan woke up in the third round but that wasn't enough to take the victory. He became Enfusion champion and took $30.000 after knocking out Andrew Tate in the final with a jumping knee.

== Return and retirement ==
After two years break and changing gym Grajš made his comeback on 29 November 2014 in Novo Mesto at International Muay Thai League event. Grajš, now member of Nak Muay Gym, lost on points against W.A.K.O. junior world champion, Antonio Plazibat.

He had to cancel fight against Mladen Kujunđžić at FFC 18 event, due to a nose injury. After that he decided to finish his career, as he could not focus on the fight enough anymore.

== Achievements/Titles ==
- 2012 Enfusion: Trial of the Gladiators Tournament Champion
- 2012 IFMA World Cup Champion
- 2011 SMTL - Slovenian Muay Thai League Professional Champion -91 kg
- Best 85 Max Kickboxer In 2012

== Professional Muai Thai /kickboxing Record ==
34 Wins(14KO) -8 Losses
Date	Result	Opponent	Event	Location	Method	Round	Time
2017-09-16	Win	(Bosnia and Herzegovina) Denis Marjanović	W5 Legends Collide	Koper, Slovenia	Decision (Unanimous)	3	3:00
2014-11-29	Loss	(Croatia) Antonio Plazibat	International Muai Thai league	Novo Mesto, Slovenia	Decision (Points)	3	N/A
Returns To Muay Thai, Moves Up To 91kg.
2012-12-02	Win	(United States) Andrew Tate	Enfusion 3: Trial of the Gladiators, Final	Ljubljana, Slovenia	KO (Knee)	1	N/A
Wins Enfusion 85kg tournament championship title.
2012-12-02	Win	(Armenia) Sahak Parparyan	Enfusion 3: Trial of the Gladiators, Semi Finals	Ljubljana, Slovenia	Decision (Unanimous)	3	3:00
2012-08-18	Win	(Croatia) Ivan Stanić	Admiral Markets Fight Night	Portorož, Slovenia	Decision (Split)	3	3:00
2011-08-17	Win	(Curaçao) Wendell Roche	Enfusion 3: Trial of the Gladiators, Quarter Final	Ohrid, Macedonia	Decision (Unanimous)	3	3:00
2011-08-12	Win	(Belgium) Michael Kongolo	Enfusion 3: Trial of the Gladiators, First round	Ohrid, Macedonia	KO	1	N/A
2011-02-05	Win	(Netherlands) Abudar Ahmed	The Night Of Champions	Novo Mesto, Slovenia	TKO (Injury)	1	N/A
Wins SMTL Pro. Title -91 kg.
2010-07-09	Loss	(Croatia) Agron Preteni	Mega Fight	Umago, Croatia	Decision	3	3:00
2010-03-06	Win	(Serbia) Luka Stasia	SLTB	Celje, Slovenia	TKO	3	N/A
2009-05-30	Win	(Croatia) Josip Poplašen	National Championship	Črnomelj, Slovenia	KO	2	N/A
2009-03-07	Win	(Hungary) Zsolt Svidro	Situla Pokal	Novo Mesto, Slovenia	Decision (Unanimous)	3	N/A
2008-12-27	Win	(Croatia) Hrvoje Kišiček	Grand Fight	Varaždin, Croatia	Decision (Split)	3	N/A
2007-10-20	Win	(Croatia) Josip Božinović	Pokal Situla	Novo Mesto, Slovenia	Decision (Unanimous)	3	N/A
2007-06-02	Win	(Croatia) Spomenko Dukić	Slovenija open	Krško, Slovenia	Decision (Unanimous)	3	N/A
2007-02-24	Win	(Slovenia) Matjaž Kos	Muay thai proti drogi	Novo Mesto, Slovenia	KO	2	N/A
2005	Win	(Slovenia) Teofik Ramčilović	Muay Thai proti drogi	Novo Mesto, Slovenia	Decision (Unanimous)	3	N/A
2004	Loss	(Slovenia) Anže Andrejka	Muai Thai proti Drogi	Novo Mesto, Slovenia	Decision (Split)	3	N/A
2004-11-06	Win	(Croatia) Spomenko Dukić	Noč Tigrova	Široki Brijeg, BIH	Decision (Unanimous)	3	N/A
