= Clara Pennequin =

French kickboxer

- Born: August 13, 2004 (age 22)
- Height: 175 cm (5 ft 9 in)
- Style: Kickboxing
- Team: TEAM VANHOVE

Kickboxing record
- Total: 3
- Wins: 3
- By knockout: 1
- Losses: 0

Clara Pennequin (born August 13, 2004) is a French kickboxer who is the current Enfusion Women's Bantamweight Champion.

As of December 2024, she is the #10 ranked women openweight kickboxer in the world according to Beyond Kickboxing.

== Championships and accomplishments ==
=== Professional kickboxing ===
- Enfusion
  - 2024 Enfusion Women's Bantamweight Championship

== Fight record ==
Kickboxing record
3 wins (1 KOs), 0 losses, 0 draws
Date	Result	Opponent	Event	Location	Method	Round	Time
2024-09-21	Win	(Turkey) Sheyda Ozdemir	Enfusion 139	Alkmaar, Netherlands	Decision (Unanimous)	5	2:00
Wins the vacant Enfusion World Bantamweight (-61kg) Championship.
2024-04-17	Win	(Netherlands) Gina Weerdenburg	Enfusion 133	Alkmaar, Netherlands	Decision (Unanimous)	3	3:00
2023-10-07	Win	(France) Coralie Robert	Enfusion 125	Waregem, Belgium	KO	1	
