= Thian de Vries =

Dutch kickboxer (born 2001)

- Born: Thian Kellen de Vries; 26 April 2001 (age 25); Terneuzen, Zeeland, Netherlands
- Other names: Tarzan
- Height: 1.88 m (6 ft 2 in)
- Weight: 90 kg (200 lb; 14 st)
- Division: Light Heavyweight; Cruiserweight
- Reach: 74.8 in (190 cm)
- Stance: Orthodox
- Fighting out of: Oostburg, Netherlands
- Team: Luc Verheije Fight Club
- Trainer: Luc Verheije

Kickboxing record
- Total: 36
- Wins: 35
- By knockout: 31
- Losses: 0
- Draws: 0
- No contests: 1

Thian Kellen de Vries (born 26 April 2001) is a Dutch professional kickboxer. He is the current Colosseum Tournament, Enfusion and K-1 world champion.

As of July 2026, De Vries is ranked as the #10 light-heavyweight in the world by Beyond Kick.

== Career ==
A long-time resident of his hometown of Oostburg, from the province of Zeeland, De Vries started kickboxing at the age of 17 at Luc Verheije Fight Club in Aardenburg as a way to control his temper. There he trains under former champion Luc Verheije.

De Vries made his debut for the Enfusion promotion on 10 June 2023, at Enfusion 123. He defeated Chahid Chaquibi by technical knockout in the second round with low kicks.

On 30 June 2023, De Vries travelled to Romania to face Vasile Amariței for the Colosseum Tournament inaugural Light Heavyweght title. He won the fight by knockout in the second round with a spinning back fist.

On 17 October 2023, De Vries headlined a co-promoted event by Enfusion and Battle Arena in Waregem Belgium. He defeated Leo Jefferson by first-round technical knockout.

De Vries was scheduled to face Nikita Kozlov on 28 October 2023, at RCC Fair Fight in Yekaterinburg, Russia. He won the fight by unanimous decision.

De Vries faced Daniel Vítovec at 8TKO #6 in Alkmaar, Netherlands for the vacant Enfusion World Cruiserweight (-88kg) title. He won the fight by first-round knockout with a flying knee.

De Vries faced Vasile Amariței at Colosseum Tournament 41 on 8 December 2023. He won the fight by a first-round knockout.

De Vries faced Jesse Astill at an Alpha Fight Series "Australia vs The World" event on 16 February 2024. He won the fight by a second-round knockout. De Vries fought again only a week later on 24 February 2024, at Battle Arena in Zwevegem, Belgium where he knocked out Lionel Bady in the first round. De Vries faced Jente Nnamadim at 8TKO #9 for the Enfusion World Middleweight Championship, dominating the fight and knocking out Nnamadim with a spinning elbow, which was ruled illegal and the bout was a no contest.

De Vries faced Nabil el Ayyadi for the vacant Enfusion World Light Heavyweight Championship at Enfusion 157 on 18 May 2024. He won the fight by a second-round technical knockout.

De Vries faced Yuri Ceita at Elite Combat League II in Germany on 15 June 2024. He won the fight by technical knockout 52 seconds into the bout.

De Vries successfully defended his Enfusion World Cruiserweight title on 16 November 2024, when he stopped Peter Verhaegh by technical knockout in the second round at Enfusion #143.

On 9 February 2025, De Vries travelled to Tokyo, Japan, to face Carlos Budiao at K-1 World MAX 2025. He won the fight by first-round knockout.

On 29 March 2025, de Vries challenged Max Weekers for his Enfusion Middleweight World title at Enfusion 147. He won the fight by unanimous decision after five rounds.

De Vries successfully defended his Enfusion World Cruiserweight title for the second time when he knocked out Yasin Güren in the first round with a high kick at 8TKO #15 on 3 May 2025.

De Vries was expected to challenge the K-1 Cruiserweight (-90kg) titleholder Liu Ce at K-1 Beyond on 31 May 2025. Ce withdrew from the contest on 26 May, with a nose injury, and was stripped of the belt. De Vries was rescheduled to face Mahmoud Sattari for the vacant championship. He won the fight by a first-round knockout.

On 27 September 2025, De Vries faced Kevin van Heeckeren for the inaugural Enfusion Cage Event Xtreme Standup cruiserweight title. He won the fight by second-round knockout.

De Vries was scheduled to defend his K-1 Cruiserweight title against Liu Ce at K-1 World MAX 2025 on 15 November 2025. He was forced to withdraw after he underwent surgery for a broken hand he sustained in his previous fight against Kevin van Heeckeren.

== Championships and accomplishments ==
- Legend
  - 2025 Legend Cruiserweight (-90 kg) Champion
- Colosseum Tournament
  - 2023 Colosseum Tournament World Light Heavyweight Championship
- Enfusion
  - 2023 Enfusion World Cruiserweight (-88kg) Championship
    - Four successful defenses
  - 2024 Enfusion World Light Heavyweight (-93kg) Championship
  - 2025 Enfusion Middleweight (-84kg) World Championship
  - 2025 ECE Xtreme Standup World Cruiserweight (-88 kg) Championship
- K-1
  - 2025 K-1 Cruiserweight (-90kg) Championship
  - 2025 K-1 Knockout of the Year (vs. Mahmoud Sattari)

Awards

- Whowillwinfighting
  - 2025 Whowillwinfighting "Knockout of the Year"
- Kickboxing Romania Awards
  - 2023 Foreign Fighter of the Year
- Combat Press
  - 2025 Fight of the Year (vs. Mahmoud Sattari)

== Kickboxing record ==
Kickboxing record
35 wins (31 (T)KOs), 0 losses, 0 draws, 1 no contest
Date	Result	Opponent	Event	Location	Method	Round	Time
2027-02-11		TBA	K-1 World GP 2027 -90kg World Tournament Final 16, Quarterfinals	Tokyo, Japan			
2026-12-16		(Cameroon) Loic Njeya	Enfusion #167 & #168	Goes, Netherlands			
Defending the Enfusion World Cruiserweight (-88kg) Championship.
2026-09-26	Win	(Democratic Republic of the Congo) Ulric Bokeme	Enfusion #163 & #164	Tilburg, Netherlands	KO (left hook)	1	1:50
Defended the Enfusion World Cruiserweight (-88kg) Championship.
2026-07-20	Win	(Japan) K-Jee	K-1 Dontaku 2026	Fukuoka, Japan	KO (high kick)	1	1:26
2026-03-28	Win	(Brazil) Joilton Lutterbach	8TKO #25	Goes, Netherlands	Decision	5	3:00
Defends the Enfusion World Cruiserweight (-88kg) Championship.
2025-09-27	Win	(Netherlands) Kevin van Heeckeren	8TKO #18	Tilburg, Netherlands	KO (uppercut)	2	1:57
Won the inaugural Enfusion Cage Event Xtreme Standup World Cruiserweight (-88kg) Championship.
2025-08-31	Win	(United States) Chip Moraza-Pollard	Legend vol.2	Kariya, Aichi, Japan	KO (left cross)	1	2:35
Won the inaugural Legend Cruiserweight (-90kg) title.
2025-05-31	Win	(Iran) Mahmoud Sattari	K-1 Beyond	Yokohama, Japan	KO (left cross)	1	1:04
Won the vacant K-1 Cruiserweight (-90kg) title.
2025-05-03	Win	(Turkey) Yasin Güren	8TKO #15	The Hague, Netherlands	KO (high kick)	1	2:00
Defended the Enfusion World Cruiserweight (-88kg) Championship.
2025-03-29	Win	(Netherlands) Max Weekers	Enfusion #147	Goes, Netherlands	Decision (unanimous)	5	3:00
Won the Enfusion Middleweight (-84kg) World Championship.
2025-02-09	Win	(Brazil) Carlos Budiao	K-1 World MAX 2025	Tokyo, Japan	KO (left cross)	1	2:31
2024-12-14	Win	(Japan) Rui	K-1 World Grand Prix 2024 Final	Tokyo, Japan	KO (left cross)	1	0:27
2024-11-16	Win	(Netherlands) Peter Verhaegh	Glorious Fight Events ft Enfusion #143	Groningen, Netherlands	TKO (4 knockdowns)	2	2:05
Defended the Enfusion World Cruiserweight (-88kg) Championship.
2024-10-05	Win	(France) Mimoun Jazouli	Enfusion 140	Waregem, Belgium	TKO (jumping knee)	3	0:40
2024-07-15	Win	(Japan) Yuya	LEGEND vol.1	Chiba, Japan	TKO (referee stoppage)	1	2:45
2024-06-15	Win	(Portugal) Yuri Ceita	Elite Combat League II	Übach-Palenberg, Germany	TKO (referee stoppage)	1	0:52
2024-05-18	Win	(Morocco) Nabil el Ayyadi	Enfusion 157	Dordrecht, Netherlands	TKO (4 knockdowns/low kicks)	2	
Won the vacant Enfusion World Light Heavyweight (-93kg) Championship.
2024-04-06	NC	(Belgium) Jente Nnamadim	8TKO #9	Goes, Netherlands	No contest (illegal elbow)		
For the Enfusion World Middleweight Championship and defending the Enfusion World Cruiserweight Championship.
2024-02-24	Win	(Belgium) Lionel Bady	Battle Arena	Zwevegem, Belgium	KO (right hook)	1	
2024-02-16	Win	(Australia) Jesse Astill	AFS: Australia vs The World	Dubai, UAE	TKO (4 knockdowns)	2	
2023-12-08	Win	(Romania) Vasile Amariței	Colosseum Tournament 41	Ploiești, Romania	KO (punches)	1	1:10
2023-11-25	Win	(Czech Republic) Daniel Vítovec	8TKO #6	Alkmaar, Netherlands	KO (flying knee)	1	
Won the vacant Enfusion World Cruiserweight (-88kg) Championship.
2023-10-28	Win	(Russia) Nikita Kozlov	RCC Fair Fight 23	Yekaterinburg, Russia	Decision (unanimous)	3	3:00
2023-10-07	Win	(France) Léo Jefferson	Enfusion 125	Waregem, Belgium	TKO (referee stoppage)	1	1:25
2023-06-30	Win	(Romania) Vasile Amariței	Colosseum Tournament 39	Suceava, Romania	KO (spinning back fist)	2	1:22
Won the inaugural Colosseum Tournament World Light Heavyweight Championship.
2023-06-10	Win	(Morocco) Chahid Chaquibi	Enfusion 123	Alkmaar, Netherlands	KO (low kick)	1	2:51
2023-04-22	Win			Netherlands	KO (right cross)	1	
2023-03-10	Win	(Belgium) Selim Duman	Battle Arena, Final	Zwevegem, Belgium	TKO (corner stoppage/punches)	1	
2023-03-10	Win	(Belgium) Adrien Attia	Battle Arena, Semifinals	Zwevegem, Belgium	KO (right cross)	1	1:33
B-class debut.
2022-12-11	Win	(Netherlands)		Netherlands	TKO (3 knockdowns)	1	
2022-10-15	Win	(Belgium) Ismael Hasini	Golden Event 2	Würselen, Germany	KO (high kick)	1	0:15
2022-10-01	Win	(France) Hilaie Bahjja	Battle Arena	Waregem, Belgium	KO (right cross)	2	
2022-06-11	Win	(Belgium) Ramzi Oulad	Fightnight Top Action	Turnhout, Belgium	KO (high kick)	1	
2021-10-02	Win	(Belgium) Zeyd Albayrak	Battle Arena	Waregem, Belgium	KO (right cross)	1	0:35
2021-08-22	Win	(Netherlands) Irving Olensky	WFL Competition Round 3	The Hague, Netherlands	Decision (unanimous)	3	2:00
2021-07-18	Win	(Netherlands) Jan Willem Hiele	Akira FC	The Hague, Netherlands	KO (spinning back kick)	2	
Legend: Win Loss Draw/no contest Notes

== See also ==
- List of male kickboxers
