= Men's K-1 at WAKO World Championships 2007 Belgrade -86 kg =

Kickboxing tournament

The men's cruiserweight (86 kg/189.2 lbs) K-1 category at the W.A.K.O. World Championships 2007 in Belgrade was the third heaviest of the K-1 tournaments, involving ten fighters from two continents (Europe and Africa). Each of the matches was three rounds of two minutes each and were fought under K-1 rules.

Due to the small number of fighters unsuitable for a sixteen-man tournament, six of the men had byes through to the quarter-finals. The tournament champion was Bosnian Dženan Poturak (brother of K-1 heavyweight Dževad) who defeated Croat Ivan Stanić in the final to win gold. Defeated semi finalists Belarusian Siarhei Krauchanka and Azerbaijani Zaur Alakbarov both won bronze.

== Results ==
1st round
(Portugal) Sergio Goncalves
(Poland) Kamil Malysz | WIN
(Morocco) Ismail Gzzannagui
(Bosnia and Herzegovina) Dženan Poturak | WIN

Quarter-finals
(Austria) Ali Staubmann
(Croatia) Ivan Stanić | WIN
(Poland) Kamil Malysz
(Belarus) Siarhei Krauchanka | WIN
(Serbia) Boban Stojanović
(Bosnia and Herzegovina) Dženan Poturak | WIN
(Azerbaijan) Zaur Alakbarov
(Russia) Maxim Vinogradov

Semi-finals
(Croatia) Ivan Stanić | WIN
(Belarus) Siarhei Krauchanka
(Bosnia and Herzegovina) Dženan Poturak | WIN
(Azerbaijan) Zaur Alakbarov

Final
(Croatia) Ivan Stanić
(Bosnia and Herzegovina) Dženan Poturak | WIN

== See also ==
- List of WAKO Amateur World Championships
- List of WAKO Amateur European Championships
- List of male kickboxers
