= Enfusion =

Kickboxing promotion

- Type: Private
- Industry: Martial arts promotion
- Founded: 2011
- Founder: Edwin van Os
- Headquarters: Alkmaar, Netherlands
- Key people: Edwin van Os, CEO
- Owner: Ed/Bet B.V.
- Website: enfusionlive.com

Enfusion is a Dutch kickboxing promotion company based in Alkmaar, Netherlands. Labelled as one of the top kickboxing organizations in the world, Enfusion produces events globally, which showcase twelve kickboxing weight classes (12 male and 6 female).

== History ==
Enfusion began in 2010 with the launch of the reality television show Enfusion Reality, created by Dutch promoter Edwin van Os who was the co founder of Its Showtime which was then sold to Glory in 2012.

In 2013, the brand expanded by hosting live kickboxing events across Europe.

In 2018 Enfusion begun organizing Enfusion MMA events.

In 2019 Enfusion unveiled two new brands with Enfusion Cage Events (ECE).

=== Media coverage ===
Enfusion events were previously broadcast on Viceland in the Netherlands,

February 2022 a streaming deal covering Germany, Switzerland and Austria with fighting.de was announced. March 2022 Viaplay announced that they had acquired rights to stream Enfusion events for the next three years.

=== Glory Rivals ===
In January 2022 Enfusion and Glory announced a new series of jointly promoted events called Glory Rivals. The inaugural Rivals event was scheduled for May 21, 2022 at the Lotto Arena in Antwerp, Belgium. The event was later cancelled due to the finances of Enfusion's local promoter partner Antwerp Fight Organization catching the attention of Belgian authorities.

== Kickboxing rules ==
=== Clothing and equipment ===
Each athlete wears a pair of shorts, and is not allowed to wear shoes. Female fighters additionally wear a top. The athletes fight with 8 oz gloves if they are under 70 kg and 10 oz gloves if they are above 70 kg. They must wear a gumshield and groin protector. Vaseline is applied only to the face.

=== Permitted techniques ===
The following are considered to be fouls: Holding in the clinch to avoid striking, head butting, elbow strikes, strikes to the groin, push kicks to the knee, clinching the lower back, striking with the inside of the glove, continuing to fight after the command of the referee, biting, spitting, eye pokes, approaching the opponent with a head held too low, avoiding to fight, or simulation of being hit by an illegal strike, submission holds and wrestling takedowns. For each foul, a fighter is awarded an official warning, with three warnings warranting a disqualification.

== Events ==
Aside from their primary Enfusion events, which features the main fighters, Enfusion operates other brands of events:

Enfusion Reality: a tournament with behind the scenes perspectives into each athlete, produced over 12–14 episodes. The series often features a tournament setup where selected fighters compete for a title or a chance to advance in their careers, adding competitive stakes to the storytelling.

Enfusion Talents: Enfusion Talents showcases up and coming kickboxing prospects.

Enfusion Cage Events(ECE): These events feature a mix of kickboxing and mixed martial arts (MMA) bouts, conducted within a cage setting. ECE events allow all Muay Thai techniques, standing submissions, and takedowns. Fighters wear four or six-ounce gloves, and the action takes place inside the Enfusion cage.

Enfusion Rookies: Aimed at amateurs, this event allows fighters to showcase their abilities to talent scouts, serving as a stepping stone to professional careers.

8TKO: 8TKO is a kickboxing event series organized by Enfusion, often featuring tournaments in various weight classes. These tournaments are designed to showcase emerging talent and provide competitive opportunities for fighters.

Road2Enfusion : events aimed at discovering new talent for Enfusion's roster. These events are non-live shows focused on identifying promising fighters.

== List of events ==
Event	Date	Venue	City
Enfusion #162 & 8TKO #29	June 6, 2026	Limburghal	Genk, Belgium
ECE #684	September 20, 2026	Kortrijk Xpo	Kortrijk, Netherlands, Goes
Road2Enfusion	June 15, 2025	Sportcomplex Hoornse Vaart	Alkmaar, Netherlands
Enfusion #150	June 14, 2025	MartiniPlaza	Groningen, Netherlands
8TKO #17	June 14, 2025	MartiniPlaza	Groningen, Netherlands
Enfusion #149	May 24, 2025	Uni-Halle	Wuppertal, Germany
8TKO #16	May 24, 2025	Uni-Halle	Wuppertal, Germany
ECE #15	May 3, 2025		The Hague, Netherlands
8TKO #15	May 3, 2025		Netherlands
Road2Enfusion	April 13, 2025		Netherlands
Enfusion #148	April 12, 2025		Netherlands
8TKO #14	April 12, 2025		Netherlands
Enfusion #147	March 29, 2025		Netherlands
8TKO #13	March 29, 2025		Netherlands
Road2Enfusion#8	February 23, 2025		Netherlands
Enfusion #146	February 23, 2025		Netherlands
8TKO #12	February 23, 2025		Netherlands
Road2Enfusion	February 9, 2025		Netherlands
ECE 14	December 21, 2024	Sportcomplex Hoornse Vaart	Alkmaar, Netherlands
Enfusion 145	December 14, 2024	Uni Halle	Wuppertal, Germany
Enfusion 144	December 7, 2024	Sportcafe De Opgang	Netherlands
Enfusion 143	November 16, 2024	Martiniplaza	Groningen, Netherlands
Enfusion 142	November 2, 2024	Sportboulevard Dordrecht	Dordrecht, Netherlands
Enfusion 141	October 12, 2024	Jan Massinkhal	Nijmegen, Netherlands
Enfusion 140	October 5, 2024	Waregem expo	Waregem, Belgium
ECE #13	September 22, 2024	Sportcomplex Hoornse Vaart	Alkmaar, Netherlands
Enfusion 139	September 21, 2024	Sportcomplex Hoornse Vaart	Alkmaar, Netherlands
8TKO #11	September 21, 2024	Sportcomplex Hoornse Vaart	Alkmaar, Netherlands
Enfusion 138	June 15, 2024	Martiniplaza	Groningen, Netherlands
Road 2 Enfusion #4	June 9, 2024		Alkmaar, Netherlands
ECE 12	May 25, 2024	Sportcomplex Hoornse Vaart	Alkmaar, Netherlands
Enfusion 137	May 18, 2024	Sportboulevard Dordrecht	Dordrecht, Netherlands
Road 2 Enfusion #3	May 12, 2024		Netherlands
Enfusion 136	April 20, 2024	Sportcomplex Hoornse Vaart	Alkmaar, Netherlands
8TKO #10	April 20, 2024	Sportcomplex Hoornse Vaart	Alkmaar, Netherlands
Road 2 Enfusion #2	April 14, 2024	Sportcomplex Hoornse Vaart	Alkmaar, Netherlands
Enfusion 135	April 6, 2024	Sporthal Omnium	Zeeland, Netherlands
8TKO #9	April 6, 2024	Sporthal Omnium	Zeeland, Netherlands
Enfusion 134	March 2, 2024	Jan Massinkhal	Nijmegen, Netherlands
Enfusion 133	February 17, 2024	Sportcomplex Hoornse Vaart	Alkmaar, Netherlands
8TKO #8	February 17, 2024	Sportcomplex Hoornse Vaart	Alkmaar, Netherlands
Road 2 Enfusion #1	February 11, 2024	Sportcomplex Hoornse Vaart	Alkmaar, Netherlands
Enfusion 132	December 30, 2023	Sportcomplex Hoornse Vaart	Alkmaar, Netherlands
8TKO #7	December 30, 2023	Sportcomplex Hoornse Vaart	Alkmaar, Netherlands
Enfusion 131	December 16, 2023	Unihalle	Wuppertal, Germany
Enfusion 130	November 25, 2023	Sportcomplex Hoornse Vaart	Alkmaar, Netherlands
8TKO #6	November 25, 2023	Sportcomplex Hoornse Vaart	Alkmaar, Netherlands
Enfusion 129	November 18, 2023	MartiniPlaza	Groningen, Netherlands
Enfusion 128	November 11, 2023	Saza Topsporthal Achterhoek	Doetinchem, Netherlands
8TKO #5	November 11, 2023	Saza Topsporthal Achterhoek	Doetinchem, Netherlands
Enfusion 127	November 4, 2023	Sportboulevard Dordrecht	Dordrecht, Netherlands
ECE #11	October 28, 2023	Sportcomplex Hoornse Vaart	Alkmaar, Netherlands
Enfusion 126	October 14, 2023	Jan Messinkhal	Nijmegen, Netherlands
Enfusion 125	October 7, 2023	Waregem Expo	Waregem, Belgium
Enfusion 124	June 17, 2023	MartiniPlaza	Groningen, Netherlands
ECE #10	June 11, 2023		Netherlands
8TKO #4	June 11, 2023		Netherlands
Enfusion 123	June 10, 2023	Sportcomplex Hoornse Vaart	Alkmaar, Netherlands
8TKO #3	June 10, 2023		Netherlands
Enfusion 122	May 13, 2023		Wuppertal, Germany
Enfusion 121	April 29, 2023		Dordrecht, Netherlands
Enfusion 120	March 18, 2023	De Meent	Alkmaar, Netherlands
8TKO #2	March 18, 2023		Netherlands
ECE #9	March 5, 2023		Netherlands
Enfusion 119	March 4, 2023	Sportpaleis Alkmaar	Alkmaar, Netherlands
8TKO #1	March 4, 2023		Netherlands
Enfusion 118	February 11, 2023		Nijmegen, Netherlands
Enfusion 117	December 16, 2022		(United Arab Emirates) Dubai
Enfusion 116	November 19, 2022		Netherlands
Enfusion 115	November 12, 2022		Netherlands
Enfusion 114	November 5, 2022		Netherlands
Enfusion 113	October 22, 2022		Netherlands
RFP Presents: Enfusion 111–112	September 24, 2022		Netherlands
Enfusion 110	September 17, 2022		Netherlands
Enfusion 109	June 18, 2022		Netherlands
Glory Rivals 1	June 11, 2022		Netherlands
ECE #8	June 5, 2022		Netherlands
Enfusion 107	June 4, 2022		Germany
Enfusion 106	May 14, 2022	Sportcentrum Valkenhuizen	Arnhem, Netherlands
Enfusion 105	March 26, 2022	Sporthal de Mijse	Alkmaar, Netherlands
Enfusion 104	November 12, 2021	Etihad Arena	Abu Dhabi, United Arab Emirates
ECE #7	October 24, 2021		Germany
Enfusion 103	October 23, 2021	Unihalle	Wuppertal, Germany
Enfusion 102	September 5, 2021		Alkmaar, Netherlands
ECE #6	September 3, 2021		Netherlands
Enfusion 101	July 10, 2021		Alkmaar, Netherlands
ECE #5	July 6, 2022		Netherlands
Enfusion Live 100	July 4, 2021		Alkmaar, Netherlands
Enfusion Live 99	October 17, 2020	Unihalle	Wuppertal, Germany
ECE #4	October 9, 2020		Alkmaar, Netherlands
Enfusion Live 98	October 3, 2020		Alkmaar, Netherlands
ECE #3	September 25, 2020		Alkmaar, Netherlands
Enfusion Live 97	September 19, 2020		Alkmaar, Netherlands
Enfusion Live 96	February 29, 2020		Eindhoven, Netherlands
Enfusion Live 95	February 29, 2020		Eindhoven, Netherlands
Enfusion Live 94	December 14, 2019		Alkmaar, Netherlands
Enfusion Live 93	December 6, 2019		Abu Dhabi, United Arab Emirates
Enfusion Live 92	December 6, 2019		Abu Dhabi, United Arab Emirates
Enfusion Live 91	November 16, 2019	MartiniPlaza	Groningen, Netherlands
ECE #2	November 9, 2019	Lombos Pavilion	Lisbon, Portugal
Enfusion Live 90	November 2, 2019	Lotto Arena	Antwerp, Belgium
Enfusion Live 89	October 26, 2019	Unihalle	Wuppertal, Germany
Enfusion Live 88	October 5, 2019	Optisport Sportboulevard	Dordrecht, Netherlands
Enfusion Live 87	September 9, 2019	Eishalle Darmstadt	Darmstadt, Germany
Enfusion ECE 1	August 6, 2019		Tenerife, Spain
Enfusion Live 86	June 28, 2019		Belgrade, Serbia
Enfusion Live 85	June 8, 2019		Groningen, Netherlands
Enfusion Live 84	May 4, 2019		Darmstadt, Germany
Enfusion Live 83	April 27, 2019		Žilina, Slovakia
Enfusion Live 82	April 13, 2019	Davo Pevele Arena	Orchies, France
Enfusion live 81	March 30, 2019		Tenerife, Spain
Enfusion Live 80	March 23, 2019	Atlantico	Rome, Italy
Enfusion Live 79	February 23, 2019		Groningen, Netherlands
Enfusion Live 78	February 23, 2019		Groningen, Netherlands
Enfusion Live 78	December 15, 2018		The Hague, Netherlands
Enfusion Live 77	December 7, 2018		Abu Dhabi, United Arab Emirates
Enfusion Live 76	December 7, 2018		Abu Dhabi, United Arab Emirates
Enfusion live 75	November 17, 2018		Ostrava, Czech Republic
Enfusion Live 74	November 17, 2018	MartiniPlaza	Groningen, Netherlands
Enfusion Live MMA-2	November 10, 2018		Lisbon, Portugal
Enfusion Live 73	October 27, 2018		Oberhausen, Germany
Enfusion Live MMA-1	October 13, 2018		Alphen aan den Rijn, Netherlands
Enfusion Live 72	October 6, 2018		Madrid, Spain
Enfusion Live 71	September 29, 2018		Hamburg, Germany
Enfusion Live 70	September 15, 2018		Antwerp, Belgium
Enfusion Live 69	June 23, 2018	MartiniPlaza	Groningen, Netherlands
Enfusion Live 68	June 9, 2018		Newcastle upon Tyne, England
Enfusion Live 67	May 12, 2018		The Hague, Netherlands
Enfusion Live 66	May 5, 2018		Tenerife, Spain
Enfusion Live 65	April 28, 2018	Ice Hockey Stadium	Žilina, Slovakia
Enfusion Live 64	April 21, 2018		Darmstadt, Germany
Enfusion Live 63	March 9, 2018		Abu Dhabi, United Arab Emirates
Enfusion Live 62	February 17, 2018	Indoor Sportcentrum	Eindhoven, Netherlands
Enfusion Live 61	February 17, 2018	Indoor Sportcentrum	Eindhoven, Netherlands
Enfusion Live 60	February 2, 2018		Sallanches, France
Enfusion Live 59	December 8, 2017		Abu Dhabi, United Arab Emirates
Enfusion Live 58	December 8, 2017		Abu Dhabi, United Arab Emirates
Enfusion Live 57	December 2, 2017		The Hague, Netherlands
Enfusion Live 56	November 18, 2017	MartiniPlaza	Groningen, Netherlands
Enfusion Live 55	November 11, 2017		Amsterdam, Netherlands
Enfusion Live 54	October 10, 2017		Ludwigsburg, Germany
Enfusion Live 53	September 30, 2017		Antwerp, Belgium
Enfusion live 52	September 16, 2017		Zwolle, Netherlands
Enfusion Live 51	July 8, 2017	Halifax Forum	Halifax, Canada
Enfusion Live 50	May 5, 2017	Ice Hockey Stadium	Žilina, Slovakia
Enfusion Live 49	April 29, 2017	Ice Hockey Stadium	The Hague, Netherlands
Enfusion Live 48	March 24, 2017		(United Arab Emirates) Abu Dhabi, Netherlands
Enfusion Live 47	March 18, 2017	Jan Massinkhal	Nijmegen, Netherlands
Enfusion Live 46	February 18, 2017	Indoor Sportcentrum	Abu Dhabi, United Arab Emirates
Enfusion Live 45	December 9, 2016	Sportcentrum Silverdome	Zoetermeer, Netherlands
Enfusion Live 44	December 3, 2016	Sporthal Overbosch	The Hague, Netherlands
Enfusion Live 43	November 20, 2016	MartiniPlaza	Groningen, Netherlands
Enfusion Live 42	October 8, 2016	Cubierta de Leganes	Madrid, Spain
Enfusion Live 41	September 17, 2016	Lotto Arena	Antwerp, Belgium
Enfusion Live 40	June 4, 2016	Gran Canaria Arena	Gran Canaria, Spain
Enfusion Live 39	April 23, 2016	Ice Hockey Stadium	Žilina, Slovakia
Enfusion Live 38	April 2, 2016	Uithof	The Hague, Netherlands
Enfusion Live 37	April 18, 2015	Indoor Sportcentrum	Eindhoven, Netherlands
Enfusion Live 36	February 7, 2016	Petchbuncha Stadium	Ko Samui, Thailand
Enfusion Live 35	April 18, 2015	Antwerp Expo	Antwerp, Belgium
Enfusion Live 34	November 21, 2015	MartiniPlaza	Groningen, Netherlands
Enfusion Live 33	Nov 07, 2015	Salle Du Midi	Martigny, Switzerland
Enfusion Live 32	Oct 10, 2015	Sporthal Bourgoyen	Ghent, Belgium
Enfusion Live 31	Sep 19, 2015		Málaga, Spain
Enfusion Live 30	Jul 11, 2015	Spin Disco Arena	(Republic of Ireland) Dublin, Ireland
Enfusion Live 29	May 24, 2015		Amsterdam, Netherlands
Enfusion Live 28	April 25, 2015		Žilina, Slovakia
Enfusion Live 27	April 18, 2015	Palacio Municipal de Deportes	Tenerife, Spain
Enfusion Live 26	April 4, 2015	Sportstadion de Uithof	The Hague, Netherlands
Enfusion Live 25	March, 2015	Turnhout	Turnhout, Belgium
Enfusion Live 24	Februari 7, 2015	Genderbeemd sporthal	Eindhoven, Netherlands
Enfusion Live 23	December 21, 2014	The Noxx	Antwerp, Belgium
Enfusion Live 22	November 23, 2014	MartiniPlaza	Groningen, Netherlands
Enfusion Live 21	October 4, 2014	Jahrhunderthalle	Merseburg, Germany
Enfusion Live 20	July 12, 2014	Palma Arena	Mallorca, Spain
Enfusion Live 19	June 29, 2014		London, England
Enfusion Live 18	May 25, 2014	Sporthal De Weeren	Amsterdam, Netherlands
Enfusion Live 17	Apr 26, 2014	Doxx Bet Arena	Žilina, Slovakia
Enfusion Live 16	Apr 05, 2014	Leidschenveen Sportshal	The Hague, Netherlands
Enfusion Live 15	Mar 22, 2014	National Basketball Arena	(Republic of Ireland) Dublin, Ireland
Enfusion Live 14	Feb 22, 2014	Ookmeerhal	Amsterdam, Netherlands
Enfusion Live 13	Jan 25, 2014	Genderbeemd sporthal	Eindhoven, Netherlands
Enfusion Live 12	Jan 12, 2014	Sporthal Hoornsevaart	Alkmaar, Netherlands
Enfusion Live 11	Dec 01, 2013	The O2 Arena	London, England
Enfusion Live 10	Nov 16, 2013	Lambershal Sporthal	Groningen, Netherlands
Enfusion Live 9	Nov 03, 2013	Event Plaza	The Hague, Netherlands
Enfusion Live 8	Oct 12, 2013	The O2 Arena	London, England
Enfusion 4: Search for the SuperPro, Final	September 17, 2013		Thailand
Enfusion 4: Search for the SuperPro, First Round	September 12, 2013		Thailand
Enfusion Live 7	Jul 13, 2013	Pabellón Municipal de Deportes	Tenerife, Spain
Enfusion Live 6	Jun 29, 2013	The O2 Arena	London, England
Enfusion Live 5	May 11, 2013	Theo Koomenlaan sporthal	Eindhoven, Netherlands
Enfusion Live 4	Apr 13, 2013	Marof sporthal	Novo Mesto, Slovenia
Enfusion Live 3	Mar 30, 2013	The O2 Arena	London, England
Enfusion Live 2	Mar 09, 2013	Pavelló Olímpic de Badalona	Barcelona, Spain
Enfusion Live 1	Feb 02, 2013	Zwembad Sporthal	Zwevegem, Belgium
Enfusion 3: Trial of the Gladiators, Semi Final, Final	December 2, 2012		Slovenia
Enfusion 2: Quest for honor, Semi Final, Final	December 30, 2011		Czech Republic
Enfusion 3: Trial of the Gladiators, Quarter Final	August 17, 2011		(North Macedonia) Macedonia
Enfusion 3: Trial of the Gladiators, First round	August 12, 2011		(North Macedonia) Macedonia
Enfusion 2: Quest for honor, 2nd round	February 2011		Thailand
Enfusion 2: Quest for honor, first round	February 2011		Thailand
Enfusion 1: Test of the Champions, Semi Final, Final	July 10, 2010		Portugal
Enfusion 1: Test of the Champions, 2nd round	2010		Thailand
Enfusion 1: Test of the Champions, 1st round	2010		Thailand

== Champions ==
=== Current champions ===
Enfusion men's championship
Division	Weight limit	Champion	Date Won	Days
Heavyweight	Unlimited	Vacant		0
Light Heavyweight	93 kg	(Netherlands) Thian de Vries	May 18, 2024	912
Cruiserweight	88 kg	(Netherlands) Thian de Vries	November 25, 2023	1087
Middleweight	84 kg	(Morocco) Anwar Dira	June 6, 2026	163
Super Welterweight	80 kg	(Netherlands) Nick Regter	November 1, 2025	380
Welterweight	77 kg	(Morocco) Youssef Khalouta	December 20, 2025	331
Super Lightweight	73.5 kg	(Belgium) Jannes Vercaemst	June 6, 2026	163
Lightweight	70 kg	(Morocco) Anouar Afakir	May 2, 2026	198
Super Featherweight	67.5 kg	(Morocco) Anouar Afakir	September 27, 2025	415
Featherweight	65 kg	(Morocco) Hamza Essalih	December 14, 2024	702
Super-Bantamweight	63 kg	(Morocco) Ahmed Akoudad	November 1, 2025	380
Bantamweight	61 kg	(Turkey) Muhammed Şimşek	November 16, 2025	365

Enfusion women's championship
Division	Weight limit	Champion	Date Won	Days
Open class	Unlimited	Vacant	N/A	N/A
Lightweight	70 kg	(Netherlands) Marieke Calis	September 21, 2024	786
Featherweight	65 kg	Vacant		0
Bantamweight	61 kg	(France) Clara Pennequin	September 21, 2024	786
Flyweight	57.5 kg	(Netherlands) Valence Bickel	November 14, 2026	2
Super Strawweight	54 kg	(Netherlands) Kyara van der Klooster	November 2, 2024	744
Strawweight	52 kg	(Netherlands) Tessa de Kom	September 17, 2022	1521

=== Enfusion Heavyweight World Championship ===
Weight limit: Unlimited

Name	Date	Defenses
(England) Daniel Sam (def. Mo Boubkari)	September 17, 2013	
(Morocco) Ismael Lazaar (def. Daniel Sam)	June 29, 2014	def. Thomas Vanneste on February 7, 2015; def. Andrew Thomson on December 19, 2015
(Netherlands) Jahfarr Wilnis (def. Ismael Lazaar)	February 27, 2016	
(Netherlands) Luis Tavares (def. Jahfarr Wilnis)	September 30, 2017	def. Mrad Akram on December 2, 2017; def. Fatih Ulusoy on March 9, 2018
Tavares vacated the title on September 21, 2018, after moving down a weight class.
(Netherlands) Levi Rigters (def. Martin Pacas)	October 27, 2018	def. Nidal Bchiri on February 23, 2019
Rigters vacated the title on August 25, 2020, after signing with Glory.
(Netherlands) Martin Terpstra (def. Nidal Bchiri)	September 17, 2022	def. Abderrahman Barkouch on March 18, 2023
Terpstra vacated the title in 2023 after signing with Glory.
(Morocco) Nidal Bchiri (def. Winfried Jops)	May 18, 2024	

=== Enfusion Light Heavyweight Championship ===
Former Weight limit: 95 kg (209.4 lb)
Current Weight limit: 93 kg (205.0 lb)

Name	Date	Defenses
(Morocco) Mohamed Boubkari (def. Niko Falin)	October 4, 2014	def. Mickael Yapi on April 2, 2016
(Netherlands) Luis Tavares (def. Mohamed Boubkari)	April 29, 2017	
Tavares vacated the title on September 22, 2018, after signing with Glory.
(Romania) Bogdan Stoica (def. Levi Kuyken)	October 27, 2018	
(Spain) Moises Baute (def. Mohamed Boubkari)	October 26, 2019	
In 2021 the weight was switched from 95 kg to 93 kg
(Suriname) Jermaine Puljhun (def. Pavlos Kochliaridis)	October 23, 2021	
Puljhun was stripped of his title in late 2022 for inactivity
(Netherlands) Mory Kromah (def. Youness Ben Malek)	February 11, 2023	def. Steven van den Broek on October 23, 2023
Kromah vacated the title to sign with Glory.
(Netherlands) Thian de Vries (def. Nabil el Ayyadi)	May 18, 2024	

=== Enfusion Cruiserweight World Championship ===
Former Weight limit: 90 kg (198.4 lb)
Current Weight limit: 88 kg (194.0 lb)

Name	Date	Defenses
(Curaçao) Wendell Roche (def. Moisés Ruibal)	July 13, 2013	
(England) Andrew Tate (def. Wendell Roche)	June 29, 2014	
(Netherlands) Ibrahim El Boustati (def. Andrew Tate)	December 3, 2016	
In 2023 the weight class was brought back and the weight was switched from 90 kg to 88 kg
(Netherlands) Thian de Vries (def. Daniel Vítovec)	November 25, 2023	def. Peter Verhaegh on November 16, 2024; def. Yasin Güren on May 3, 2025; def. Joilton Lutterbach on March 28, 2026

=== Enfusion Middleweight World Championship ===
Former Weight limit: 85 kg (187.4 lb)
Current Weight limit: 84 kg (185.2 lb)

Name	Date	Defenses
(Slovakia) Miroslav Cingel (def. Jiří Žák)	April 26, 2014	
Cingel vacates the title in April 2015, due to an injury.
(Netherlands) Ibrahim El Boustati (def. Tomas Senkyr)	April 25, 2015	def. Miroslav Cingel on April 2, 2016; def. Filip Verlinden on April 29, 2017
El Boustati later vacated the title.
(Netherlands) Khalid El Bakouri (def. Anis Bouzid)	September 7, 2019	
In 2021 the weight was switched from 85 kg to 84 kg
(Iran) Mohammad Ghaedibardeh (def. Khalid El Bakouri)	November 12, 2021	
Ghaedibardeh was stripped of the title in 2023.
(Belgium) Jente Nnamadim (def. Kevin van Heeckeren)	December 16, 2023	
Nnamadim vacated the title in order to sign with Glory.
(Netherlands) Max Weekers (def. Rodrigo Mineiro)	November 16, 2024	
(Netherlands) Thian de Vries (def. Max Weekers)	March 29, 2025	
De Vries vacated the title in 2026.
(Morocco) Anwar Dira (def. Max Weekers)	June 6, 2026	

=== Enfusion Super Welterweight World Championship ===
Weight limit: 80 kg (176.4 lb)

Name	Date	Defenses
(Croatia) Zlatko Bajić (def. Wendell Zaalman)	October 27, 2012	
Bajić vacated the title in 2013.
(Netherlands) Hicham El Gaoui (def. Aidan Brooks)	March 22, 2014	def. Karapet Karapetyan on March 13, 2015
(Slovakia) Vladimír Moravčík (def. Hicham El Gaoui)	May 6, 2017	def. Nampon Top Phuket on April 28, 2018
(Netherlands) Robin Ciric (def. Vladimír Moravčík)	April 27, 2019	
(Netherlands) Nick Regter def. Mischa Eradus	March 2, 2024	
(Morocco) Bilal Loukili def. Nick Regter	October 12, 2024	
Loukili vacated the title in 2025.
(Suriname) Rudsel Zinhagel def. Soufyan El Atiaoui	June 14, 2025	
(Netherlands) Nick Regter (2) def. Rudsel Zinhagel	November 1, 2025	

=== Enfusion Welterweight World Championship ===
Weight limit: 77 kg (169.8 lb)

Name	Date	Defenses
(Curaçao) Endy Semeleer (def. Jay Overmeer)	November 12, 2021	
Semeleer vacated the title, after signing with Glory.
(Netherlands) Mohamed Touchassie (def. Robin Ciric)	June 18, 2022	def. Soufiane el Ballouti on September 24, 2022
Touchassie vacated the title in 2023 after signing with Glory.
(Netherlands) Amin Choukoud (def. Franck Rubanguka)	November 4, 2023	
Choukoud vacated the title in 2025.
(Morocco) Youssef Khalouta (def. Christian Baya)	December 20, 2025	

=== Enfusion Super Lightweight World Championship ===
Weight limit: 73.5 kg (162.0 lb)

Name	Date	Defenses
(Netherlands) Tayfun Özcan (def. Andy Souwer)	February 17, 2018	def. Ardalan Sheikholeslam on September 29, 2018; def. Endy Semeleer on February 23, 2019
Özcan vacated the title in May 2020, after signing with ONE Championship.
(Curaçao) Endy Semeleer (def. Nordin van Roosmalen)	October 3, 2020	
(Netherlands) Levi Minkenberg (def. Mahmoud Sfef (overturned decision)	November 18, 2023	def. Bilal el Alaoui on April 20, 2024; def. Bellen Yantaki on November 16, 2024
(Belgium) Jannes Vercaemst (def. Levi Minkenberg)	June 6, 2026	

=== Enfusion Lightweight World Championship ===
Weight limit: 70 kg (154.3 lb)

Name	Date	Defenses
(Spain) David Calvo (def. Mirko Vorkapić)	April 26, 2014	def. Robbie Hageman
Calvo vacated the title in 2015.
(Spain) Jonay Risco (def. Dzianis Zuev)	June 4, 2016	def. Nordin Ben Moh on September 15, 2018; def. Buakaw Banchamek on March 5, 2019
(Netherlands) Tayfun Özcan (def. Jonay Risco)	December 6, 2019	
Özcan vacated the title on May 19, 2020, after signing with ONE Championship.
(Netherlands) Darryl Verdonk (def. Younes Smaili)	September 24, 2022	
(Morocco) Ilias Zouggary (def. Darryl Verdonk)	February 11, 2023	
The title was vacated on 3 September 2023, as Zouggary decided to focus on the Super Featherweight division in the future.
(Morocco) Khalid El Moukadam (def. Saif Harnafi)	March 2, 2024	
El Moukadam vacated the title in 2026.
(Morocco) Anouar Afakir (def. Serhii Adamchuk)	May 2, 2026	

=== Enfusion Super Featherweight World Championship ===
Former Weight limit: 67 kg (147.7 lb)
Current Weight limit: 67.5 kg (148.8 lb)

Previously known as Featherweight before 2021

Name	Date	Defenses
(Morocco) Mohammed Jaraya (def. Mohamed Galaoui)	April 5, 2014	
Jaraya vacated the title in 2014
(Netherlands) Ilias Bulaid (def. Zaid Zairov)	December 20, 2014	def. Simón Santana on July 11, 2015; def. Edye Ruiz on November 11, 2015; def. Zakaria Zouggary on February 18, 2017
Bulaid vacated the title in 2019
(Morocco) Mohammed Boutasaa (def. Khalid El Moukadam)	February 29, 2020	
In 2021 the weight was switched from 67 kg to 67.5 kg
Boutasaa vacated the title in 2022
(Morocco) Ilias Zouggary (def. Nick Gruijters)	April 29, 2023	
Zouggary vacated the title in 2025
(Morocco) Anouar Afakir (def. Chouaza Tulis)	September 27, 2025	

=== Enfusion Featherweight World Championship ===
Weight limit: 65 kg (143.3 lb)

Name	Date	Defenses
(Turkey) Deniz Demirkapu (def. Hamza Essalih)	September 24, 2022	
Demirkapu vacated the title in 2024 when he signed with Glory
(Morocco) Hamza Essalih (def. Rhydel Vogelenzang)	December 14, 2024	

=== Enfusion Super Bantamweight World Championship ===
Weight limit: 63 kg (138.9 lb)

Name	Date	Defenses
(England) Greg Wootton (def. Pietje Doorjé)	October 12, 2013	
Wootton vacated the title in 2015.
(Thailand) Keng Superpro Samui (def. Simon Santana)	February 6, 2016	def. Mohamed Didouh on November 20, 2016
(Netherlands) Soufiane Kaddouri (def. Keng Superpro Samui)	March 18, 2017	def. Wail Karroumi on May 12, 2018; def. Andre Bruhl on February 23, 2019; def. Hamza Essalih on November 2, 2019
The title was vacated later
(Morocco) Ayoub Bourass def. Salah Hitou	March 2, 2024	
Bourass vacated the title in 2024 when he signed with Glory
(Morocco) Ahmed Akoudad def. Piëtro Doorjé	November 1, 2025	

=== Enfusion Bantamweight Championship ===
Former Weight limit: 60 kg (132.3 lb)
Current Weight limit: 61 kg (134.5 lb)

Name	Date	Defenses
(Thailand) Rittijack Kaewsamrit (def. Amine Kacem)	June 29, 2013	
Rittijack vacated the title in 2014
(Morocco) Ali Zoubai (def. Tommy Dieckmann)	April 4, 2015	
(Netherlands) Ilias Ennahachi (def. Ali Zoubai)	May 14, 2016	def. Cristofer Opazos on October 8, 2016; def. Krobsut Fairtex on March 9, 2018; def. Madani Belhaddad on April 13, 2019
Ennahachi vacated the title in 2019
(China) Zhao Chongyang (def. Pietro Doorje)	August 31, 2019	
Zhao vacated the title in 2021
In 2021 the weight was switched from 60 to 61 kg
(Netherlands) Matthew Daalman (def. Muhammed Simsek)	May 14, 2022	def. Muhammed Simsek on June 10, 2023
(Morocco) Rida Bellahcen (def. Matthew Daalman)	June 15, 2024	
(Turkey) Muhammed Şimşek (def. Rida Bellahcen)	November 16, 2025	def. Ayoub Bourass on May 2, 2026

=== Enfusion Flyweight Championship ===
Former Weight limit: 57 kg (125.7 lb)

Name	Date	Defenses
(China) Wang Junguang (def. Jorge Varela)	August 31, 2019	
The title was retired in 2020

=== Enfusion Women's Openweight Championship ===
No weight restrictions

Name	Date	Defenses
(Netherlands) Dajenka Meijer (def. Anique Hilgerink)	November 19, 2022	def. Ibtissam Kassrioui on May 16, 2023
Meijer vacated the title in 2023.

=== Enfusion Women's Lightweight Championship ===
Weight limit: 70 kg (154.3 lb)

Name	Date	Defenses
(Netherlands) Marieke Calis (def. Iveta Srncova)	September 21, 2024	

=== Enfusion Women's Super Featherweight World Championship (defunct) ===
Weight limit: 67 kg (147.7 lb)

Name	Date	Defenses
(Netherlands) Sheena Widdershoven (def. Rachel Adamus)	May 24, 2015	
(Morocco) Najat Hasnouni-Alaoui (def. Sheena Widdershoven)	September 17, 2016	
(Netherlands) Dolly McBean (def. Najat Hasnouni-Alaoui)	September 22, 2017	def. Johanna Kruse on April 20, 2018
McBean vacated the title in 2018
(Germany) Johanna Kruse (def. Sarah Gobe)	October 27, 2018	
(Netherlands) Sheena Widdershoven (def. Johanna Kruse)	April 5, 2019	
(Netherlands) Sarah Göbel (def. Sheena Widdershoven)	October 3, 2020	
Göbel vacated the title in 2021. The title was subsequently deactivated

=== Enfusion Women's Featherweight Championship ===
Former Weight limit: 64 kg (141.1 lb)
Current Weight limit: 65 kg (143.3 lb)

Name	Date	Defenses
(Netherlands) Rachida Bouhout (def. Laetitia Bakissy)	November 16, 2013	def. Vicky Church on February 22, 2014
(Belgium) Anke Van Gestel (def. Rachida Bouhout)	December 19, 2015	def. Niamh Kinehan on March 24, 2017
Van Gestel vacated the title in 2018
(Netherlands) Sarel de Jong (def. Chellina Chirino)	June 13, 2018	def. Sanne de Ruijter on June 8, 2019
In 2021 the weight was switched from 64 kg to 65 kg
(Netherlands) Jorina Baars (def. Sarah Worsfold)	June 18, 2022	def. Erica Björnestrand on November 19, 2022; def. Emma Abrahamsson on March 18, 2023

=== Enfusion Women's Bantamweight Championship ===
Weight limit: 61 kg (134.5 lb)

Name	Date	Defenses
(Belgium) Anke Van Gestel (def. Ilona Wijmans)	February 2, 2013	def. Lindsay Haycraft on May 25, 2014; def. Aleide Lawant on October 10, 2015
Van Gestel vacated the title in late 2015.
(Netherlands) Aleide Lawant (def. Marisa Pires)	December 9, 2016	
Lawant vacated the title in late 2017.
(Netherlands) Orinta van der Zee (def. Niamh Kinehan)	September 16, 2017	
van der Zee vacated the title in late 2018.
(Netherlands) Sarel de Jong (def. Samira Kovačević)	November 17, 2018	def. Madelen Søfteland on November 16, 2019; def. Aylina Engel on September 19, 2020; def. Vitoria De Mauro on November 19, 2022
de Jong vacated the title in mid 2023.
(Netherlands) Nina van Dalum (def. Kelly Danioko)	November 18, 2023	def. Angelique Mathea on June 15, 2024
Van Dalum vacated the title in 2024.
(France) Clara Pennequin (def. Sheyda Ozdemir)	September 21, 2024	

=== Enfusion Women's Flyweight Championship ===
Weight limit: 57.5 kg (126.8 lb)

Name	Date	Defenses
(Netherlands) Ilona Wijmans (def. Nathalie Visschers)	April 13, 2013	def. Nevenka Mikulić
Wijmans vacated the title in late 2013.
(Netherlands) Denise Kielholtz (def. Ilona Wijmans)	April 26, 2014	def. Tiffany van Soest on November 24, 2014
Kielholtz vacated the title in 2016.
(Australia) Sammy Lee (def. Lucia Krajčović)	May 6, 2017	
Lee vacated the title in 2018.
(Netherlands) Georgina Van Der Linden (def. Rita Carvalho)	May 12, 2018	def. Karolina Klusova on December 7, 2018
Van Der Linden vacated the title on March 28, 2020, after signing with ONE Championship.
(Curaçao) Chellina Chirino (def. Hélène Connart)	October 3, 2020	
(Belgium) Hélène Connart (def. Nina van Dalum)	September 5, 2021	
(Netherlands) Nina van Dalum (def. Hélène Connart)	September 17, 2022	def. Suad Salimova on June 17, 2023; def. Angelique Mathea on June 15, 2024; def. Miranda Zondervan on June 14, 2025
Van Dalum vacated the title in 2026.
(Netherlands) Valence Bickel (def. Kim De Man)	November 14, 2026	

=== Enfusion Women's Super Strawweight Championship ===
Weight limit: 54 kg (119.0 lb)

Name	Date	Defenses
(England) Iman Barlow (def. Alexis Rufus)	March 30, 2013	
(Spain) Eva Naranjo (def. Iman Barlow)	July 13, 2013	
Naranjo vacated the title in 2014
(England) Iman Barlow (def. Iman Ghbalou Chairi)	July 12, 2014	def. Samantha van Doorn on November 7, 2015; def. Veronika Petríková on April 23, 2016; def. Ilsury Hendrikse on November 20, 2016; def. Ashley Nichols on July 8, 2017; def. Lara Fernandez on June 9, 2018; def. Delphine Guénon on April 13, 2019
Barlow vacated the title in October 2019, after signing with ONE Championship.
(Netherlands) Ella Grapperhaus (def. Atenea Flores)	October 17, 2020	
(Turkey) Feride Kirat (def. Valentina Simanikhina)	November 4, 2023	def. Miranda Zondervan on May 18, 2024
(Netherlands) Kyara van der Klooster (def. Feride Kirat)	November 2, 2024	def. Manon Leeuwinga on Nov 1, 2025

=== Enfusion Women's Strawweight Championship ===
Weight limit: 52 kg (114.6 lb)

Name	Date	Defenses
(Scotland) Amy Pirnie (def. Silvia La Notte)	March 23, 2019	
The title was vacated later.
(France) Aurore Dos Santos (def. Monika Chochlíková)	April 27, 2019	
Dos Santos vacated the title in 2019.
(Spain) Cristina Morales (def. Georgina Van Der Linden)	October 26, 2019	
The title was vacated later.
(Netherlands) Tessa de Kom (def. Suhailey Albertus)	September 17, 2022	def. Kyara van der Klooster on April 12, 2025

== Tournament Champions ==
Enfusion 18- Man 70 kg MAX Tournament
Date	Champion	Nationality	Event	Location	Runner-up	Nationality
2016-02-27	Tayfun Ozcan	Turkey	Enfusion #37	Eindhoven, Netherlands	Mohammed Jaraya	Morocco

Enfusion Abu Dhabi 8-Man Tournament 72.5 kg
Date	Champion	Nationality	Event	Location	Runner-up	Nationality
2017-12-08	Endy Semeleer	Curaçao	Enfusion #59	Abu Dhabi, UAE	Superbon Banchamek	Thailand

Enfusion Abu Dhabi 8-Man Tournament 72.5 kg
Date	Champion	Nationality	Event	Location	Runner-up	Nationality
2018-12-07	Superbon Banchamek	Thailand	Enfusion #76	Abu Dhabi, UAE	Marouan Toutouh	Morocco

== Enfusion Reality ==
=== Season 1, Test of the Champions – 2010 ===
In season 1, 18 professional fighters from around the world were gathered on the island of Ko Samui. They were divided into four teams chosen and led by four female captains. They competed against the three other teams composed of challengers in the 70MAX weight category. Final four fighters were: Pajonsuk, Gago Drago, Rick Barnhill and Armen Petrosyan and they fought in Lisbon. Pajonsuk defeated Armen Petrosyan by extra round decision, Gago Drago defeated Rick Barnhill by second-round knockout. Gago Drago became champion, defeating Pajonsuk in the finals by judges decision.

=== Season 2, Quest for honor – 2011 ===
For the second season, Enfusion introduced the 95MAX division. Once again, the contestants trained during the season on the island of Ko Samui. Final four fighters were: Mohamed Boubkari, Frank Munoz, Ondřej Hutník and Wendell Roche and they fought in Prague. Ondřej Hutník defeated Mohamed Boubkari by decision, Frank Munoz defeated Wendell Roche by decision. Ondřej Hutník became champion, defeating Frank Munoz in the finals by judges' decision.

=== Season 3, Trial of the Gladiators – Macedonia 2011 ===
The third season welcomes fighters from 18 countries to Ohrid, Macedonia. The weight category of this tournament is from the 85-kilo division. The athletes were arranged into teams of four spearheaded by female captains. Both the male athletes and female athletes compete in an elimination tournament.

=== Season 4, Search for The Superpro - 2013 ===
This edition features some of the best up and coming world class kickboxers from the heavyweight division. The island of Koe Samui Thailand will host the extra large edition. Ladies from the 56-kilo division will assist in helping these athletes to complete there quest for dominance to crown the forth Enfusion Reality winner.

=== Season 5, Ladies edition - 2014 ===
This edition features 18 athletes in the 54-kilogram division. The participants compete in an elimination tournament for the Enfusion Reality championship. The current 54-kilogram champion, Iman Barlow, is a participant. Coaches, including previous heavyweight winner Daniel Sam, are part of the competition. The edition was filmed at the Superpro Samui martial arts camp in Ko Samui, Thailand.

=== Season 6, Celebs Meet Pros - 2016 ===
The sixth edition features 3 tournaments, the first features males who represent 4 continents. with respective female captains. Those represented are from Europe, South America, Asia and Africa, and the Middle East. The female captains from these teams also competed in a ladies' tournament. The last tournament features a list of celebrities lambros Choutos (Greece) , Stevie Raine (England) , Glenn Helder (Netherlands) , Ze Maria (Brazil) who will fight in a pro kickboxing contest.

=== List of participants ===
==== Season 1 (2010) ====
Coaches

- (England) Bernise Alldis
- (Portugal) Catarina Valerio
- (Belgium) Eva Berben
- (Netherlands) Titiana Van Polanen

Contenders

- (Armenia) Gago Drago
- (Canada) Shane Campbell
- (South Africa) Vuyisile Colossa
- (France) Michael Lallemand
- (Finland) Pasi Luukanen
- (Slovenia) Mirko Vorkapic
- (Turkey) Şahin Yakut
- (United States) Cyrus Washington
- (Sweden) Alex Tobiasson
- (Italy) Armen Petrosyan
- (Belgium) Jan van Denderen
- (Australia) Steve Moxon
- (Thailand) Pajonsuk
- (Serbia) Goran Aleksic
- (England) Rick Barnhill
- (Romania) Barnabas Szücs
- (Portugal) Bruno Carvalho
- (Finland) Ville Aalto

Women's final

Semi Finals		Final
(Netherlands) Titiana Van Polanen	DEC
(Portugal) Catarina Valerio	3r.	(Netherlands) Titiana Van Polanen	3r.
(England) Bernise Alldis	DEC	(England) Bernise Alldis	DEC
(Belgium) Eva Berben	4r.

Men's final −70 kg

First Round
(Finland) Pasi Luukkanen
(Australia) Steve Moxon
(Armenia) Gago Drago	DEC
(Portugal) Bruno Carvalho
(England) Rick Barnhill
(Serbia) Goran Aleksic
(Turkey) Şahin Yakut	ERD
(France) Mikael Lallemand
(Thailand) Pajonsuk
(Belgium) Jan van Denderen
(Canada) Shane Campbell	DEC
(Romania) Szűcs Barnabás
(Italy) Armen Petrosyan
(South Africa) Vuyisile Colossa
(Slovenia) Mirko Vorkapić
(Sweden) Alex Tobiasson

Quarter Finals
(Finland) Pasi Luukkanen
(Armenia) Gago Drago	DEC
(England) Rick Barnhill	DEC
(Turkey) Şahin Yakut
(Thailand) Pajonsuk	TKO
(Canada) Shane Campbell	3r.
(Italy) Armen Petrosyan
(Slovenia) Mirko Vorkapić

Semi Finals
(Armenia) Gago Drago	KO
(England) Rick Barnhill	2r.
(Thailand) Pajonsuk	ERD
(Italy) Armen Petrosyan	4r.

Final
(Armenia) Gago Drago	DEC
(Thailand) Pajonsuk

==== Season 2 (2011) ====
Coaches

- (England) Julie Kitchen
- (Canada) Maria Bastasin
- (Netherlands) Aleide Lawant
- (Sweden) Hanna Mjoberg

Contenders

- (Spain) Frank Muñoz
- (Armenia) Sahak Parparyan
- (Belgium) Marc Vlieger
- (Russia) Ramazan Ramazanov
- (Finland) Miika Kinnunen
- (Curaçao) Thiago Martina
- (Czech Republic) Ondřej Hutník
- (Lithuania) Arnold Oborotov
- (Turkey) Fathi Cam
- (Germany) Martin Jahn
- (Canada) Bruno Lurette
- (Netherlands) Wendell Roche
- (Morocco) Mohamed Boubkari
- (France) David Radeff
- (Bosnia and Herzegovina) Narcis Omeragic
- (Suriname) Revanho Blokland

Women's final −63.5 kg

Semi Finals		Final
(Canada) Maria Bastasin	TKO
(England) Julie Kitchen	1r.	(Canada) Maria Bastasin	3r.
(Netherlands) Aleide Lawant	DEC	(Netherlands) Aleide Lawant	DEC
(Sweden) Hanna Mjoberg	3r.

Men's final −95 kg

First Round
(Curaçao) Thiago Matina
(Canada) Bruno Lurette
(Czech Republic) Ondřej Hutník	DEC
(Netherlands) Wendell Roche
(Morocco) Mohamed Boubkari	DEC
(United Kingdom) Arnold Oborotov
(Turkey) Fathi Cam	DEC
(France) David Radeff
(Spain) Frank Muñoz	DEC
(Armenia) Sahak Parparyan
(Belgium) Marc Vlieger
(Germany) Martin Jahn
(Bosnia and Herzegovina) Narcis Omeragić
(Finland) Miika Kinnunen
(Russia) Ramazan Ramazanov	KO
(Netherlands) Revanho Blokland	2r.

Quarter Finals
(Curaçao) Thiago Martina	3r.
(Czech Republic) Ondřej Hutník	KO
(Morocco) Mohamed Boubkari	KO
(Turkey) Fathi Cam	3r.
(Spain) Frank Muñoz	DEC
(Belgium) Marc Vlieger	3-0
(Netherlands) Wendell Roche*	ERD
(Russia) Ramazan Ramazanov

Semi Finals
(Czech Republic) Ondřej Hutník	DEC
(Morocco) Mohamed Boubkari	3-0
(Spain) Frank Muñoz	DEC
(Netherlands) Wendell Roche	3-0

Final
(Czech Republic) Ondřej Hutník	DEC
(Spain) Frank Muñoz	3-0

==== Season 3 (2012) ====
Coaches

- (Netherlands) Denise Kielholtz
- (Turkey) Hatice Ozyurt
- (England) Lucy Payne
- (Morocco) Chajmaa Bellakhal
- (United States) Lindsay Scheer

Contenders

- (Bosnia and Herzegovina) Adnan Omeragić
- (Greece) Alexandros Chatzichronoglou
- (England) Andrew Tate
- (Canada) Bruno Lurette
- (France) David Radeff
- (United States) Eddie Walker
- (Slovenia) Franci Grajš
- (Turkey) Hakan Aksoy
- (England) Jake Bostwick
- (Belgium) Michael Kongolo
- (Poland) Peter Lapuc
- (Scotland) Ritchie Hocking
- (Armenia) Sahak Parparyan
- (Finland) Ville Aalto
- (Netherlands) Wendell Roche
- (Germany) Sammy Masa
- (Portugal) João Oliveira]
- (North Macedonia) Urim Saiti

Women's final −57 kg

Semi Finals		Final
(England) Lucy Payne	DEC
(Morocco) Chajmaa Bellakhal	3r.	(England) Lucy Payne	3r.
(Netherlands) Denise Kielholtz	DEC	(Netherlands) Denise Kielholtz	DEC
(United States) Lindsay Scheer	3r.

Men's final −85 kg

First Round
(Bosnia and Herzegovina) Adnan Omeragić	DEC
(Poland) Peter Lapuc	3-0
(England) Andrew Tate	KO
(Germany) Sammy Masa	2r.
(Scotland) Ritchie Hocking	KO
(Portugal) João Oliveira
(Turkey) Hakan Aksoy
(Greece) Alexandros Chatzichronoglou
(Slovenia) Franci Grajš	KO
(Belgium) Michael Kongolo
(Netherlands) Wendell Roche	DEC
(England) Jake Bostwick
(Armenia) Sahak Parparyan	DEC
(France) David Radeff
(United States) Eddie Walker
(North Macedonia) Urim Saiti

Quarter Finals
(Bosnia and Herzegovina) Adnan Omeragić
(England) Andrew Tate	TKO
(Scotland) Ritchie Hocking
(Turkey) Hakan Aksoy
(Slovenia) Franci Grajš	DEC
(Netherlands) Wendell Roche	3-0
(Armenia) Sahak Parparyan	KO
(United States) Eddie Walker	1r.

Semi Finals
(England) Andrew Tate	TKO
(Scotland) Ritchie Hocking	1r.
(Slovenia) Franci Grajš	DEC
(Armenia) Sahak Parparyan	3-0

Final
(England) Andrew Tate	1r.
(Slovenia) Franci Grajš	KO

==== Season 4 (2013) ====
Coaches

- (Netherlands) Denise Kielholtz
- (Lebanon) Manal Salman
- (England) Vicky Church
- (New Zealand) Miriam Hummingbird
- (Belgium) Anke Van Gestel

Contenders

- (South Africa) Andrew Thomson
- (Hungary) Mate Paulovics
- (Ivory Coast) Kirk Krouba
- (Russia) Alexander Volobuev
- (England) Daniel Sam
- (Australia) Iggy McGowan
- (United States) Warren Thompson
- (Netherlands) Brian Douwes
- (Canada) Todd Stoute
- (New Zealand) Pane Haraki
- (Morocco) Mohamed Boubkari
- (France) Gaetan Sautron
- (Republic of Ireland) Chris Cooper
- (Romania) Răzvan Ghiță
- (Senegal) Sam Tevette
- (Netherlands) Wendell Roche
- (Poland) Tomasz Nowak

Women's final −61 kg

Semi Finals		Final
(Netherlands) Denise Kielholtz	DEC
(Lebanon) Manal Salman	3r.	(Netherlands) Denise Kielholtz	DEC
(England) Vicky Church	DEC	(England) Vicky Church	3r.
(New Zealand) Miriam Hummingbird	3r.

Men's final HW

First Round
(South Africa) Andrew Thomson	TKO
(Hungary) Mate Paulovics	1r.
(England) Daniel Sam	DEC
(Australia) Iggy McGowan	3-0
(Ivory Coast) Kirk Krouba	DEC
(Russia) Alexander Volobuev	3-0
(United States) Warren Thompson	DEC
(Netherlands) Brian Douwes	3-0
(Morocco) Mohamed Boubkari	TKO
(France) Gaetan Sautron	3r.
(Canada) Todd Stoute	TKO
(New Zealand) Pane Haraki	3
(Senegal) Sam Tevette	DEC
(Netherlands) Wendell Roche	3-0
(Republic of Ireland) Chris Cooper	DEC
(Romania) Razvan Ghiță	3-0

Quarter Finals
(Netherlands) Wendell Roche*	3-0
(England) Daniel Sam	DEC
(Ivory Coast) Kirk Krouba	KO
(Romania) Razvan Ghiță**	2r.
(Morocco) Mohamed Boubkari	KO
(Canada) Todd Stoute	1r.
(Senegal) Sam Tevette	DEC
(Republic of Ireland) Chris Cooper	3-0

Semi Finals
(England) Daniel Sam	DEC
(Ivory Coast) Kirk Krouba	2-1
(Morocco) Mohamed Boubkari	KO
(Senegal) Sam Tevette	4r.

Final
(England) Daniel Sam	DEC
(Morocco) Mohamed Boubkari	3-0

==== Season 5 (2014) ====
Coaches

- (Ivory Coast) Kirk Krouba
- (Suriname) Ashwin Balrak
- (Poland) Lukasz Krupadziorow
- (South Africa) Andrew Thomson
- (England) Daniel Sam

Contenders

- (Norway) Fatima Pinto
- (Sweden) Johanna Rydberg
- (South Africa) Ferial Ameeroedien
- (Germany) Meryem Uslu
- (France) Anissa Meksen
- (Netherlands) Samantha van Doorn
- (Indonesia) Soraya Haurissa
- (Netherlands) Isis Verbeek
- (Russia) Marina Zueva
- (Portugal) Filipa Correia
- (Israel) Adi Rotem]
- (England) Iman Barlow
- (Canada) Ashley Nichols
- (France) Lizzie Largillière
- (Australia) Sammy Lee Brown
- (Greece) Maria Pantazi
- (Netherlands) Simone van Dommelen
- (Croatia) Nevenka Mikulić

Finale

- Anissa Meksen defeated Iman Barlow

Coaches Finale

- Ashwin Balrak defeated Lukasz Krupadziorow

== Enfusion Reality Winners ==
Tournament Winners
Date	Champion	Nationality	Event	Location	Runner-up	Nationality
2014-09-23	Anissa Meksen	France	Enfusion 5: Victory of the Vixen	Ko Samui, Thailand	Iman Barlow	England
2013-09-17	Daniel Sam	England	Enfusion 4: Search for the SuperPro	Ko Samui, Thailand	Mohamed Boubkari	Morocco
2012-12-02	Franci Grajš	Slovenia	Enfusion 3: Trial of the Gladiators	Ljubljana, Slovenia	Andrew Tate	England
2011-12-30	Ondřej Hutník	Czech Republic	Enfusion 2: Quest for honor	Prague, Czech Republic	Frank Muñoz	Spain
2010-07-10	Gago Drago	Armenia	Enfusion 1: Test of the Champions	Lisbon, Portugal	Pajonsuk	Thailand

Team Captain's Tournaments
Date	Champion	Nationality	Event	Location	Runner-up	Nationality
2014-09-23	Ashwin Balrak	Suriname	Enfusion 5: Victory of the Vixen	Ko Samui, Thailand	Łukasz Krupadziorow	Poland
2013-09-17	Denise Kielholtz	Netherlands	Enfusion 4: Search for the SuperPro	Ko Samui, Thailand	Vicky Church	England
2012-12-02	Denise Kielholtz	Netherlands	Enfusion 3: Trial of the Gladiators	Ljubljana, Slovenia	Lucy Payne	England
2011-12-30	Aleide Lawant	Netherlands	Enfusion 2: Quest for honor	Prague, Czech Republic	Maria Bastasin	Canada
2010-07-10	Bernise Alldis	England	Enfusion 1: Test of the Champions	Lisbon, Portugal	Titiana Van Polanen	Netherlands

== See also ==
- List of kickboxing organizations
