= Ivan Stanić =

Croatian kickboxer (born 1983)

- Born: May 28, 1983 (age 43); Mostar, Croatia
- Other names: Grozni
- Nationality: (Croatia) Croatian
- Height: 1.91 m (6 ft 3 in)
- Weight: 91 kg (201 lb; 14.3 st)
- Division: Cruiserweight; Heavyweight
- Style: Muay Thai
- Fighting out of: Opatija, Croatia
- Team: OFC – Opatija Fight Club
- Trainer: Mladen Kranjčec
- Years active: 2000–2018

Kickboxing record
- Total: 45
- Wins: 32
- By knockout: 13
- Losses: 12
- Draws: 1
- Last updated on: May 12, 2012

Ivan Stanić (born May 28, 1983) is a Croatian cruiserweight Muay Thai kickboxer, former W.B.C. Muaythai world champion and King of the Ring muay thai world champion. He won the WBC Muaythai World cruiserweight title by defeating Frédérique Bellonie by a majority decision.

== Personal life ==
Stanić has finished Faculty of Tourism and Hospitality Management in Opatija. He is also a student of University of Zagreb Faculty of Kinesiology for specialist graduate professional study. He is employed by Generali Group as a risk manager, and also works as a fitness trainer for professional athletes and recreational athletes.

== Career ==
During Opatija Fight Night 2, Stanić fought the incumbent WBC Muaythai World cruiserweight champion Frédérique Bellonie for his title. He defeated Bellonie by a majority decision.

He replaced injured Cheick Sidibe in a match against tadej Toplak at Enfusion 3: Trial of the Gladiators on December 2, 2012, in Ljubljana, Slovenia. Stanić accepted the fight although he had only 10 days to prepare and to lose 9 kilograms, because of that he ended in hospital and in order to do the fight he arranged the fight in 88 kilogram limit. At the end he lost the fight after three even rounds by judges decision.

In May 2015, Stanić fought Bogdan Stoica for the vacant SUPERKOMBAT Cruiserweight Championship. Stoica won the fight by unanimous decision.

In September 2015, Stanić fought Jiri Zak for the vacant ISKA World Cruiserweight title. Stanić lost the fight by a third-round TKO.

Following this loss, Stanić won his next three fights, winning decision against Ricu Beleniuc, Samuele Canonico and Danilo Tošić.

Stanić fought once during 2017, when he met Denis Chorchyp at W5 Legends Collide. He won the fight by unanimous decision.

His last fight of 2018 came during Opatija Fight Night X, when he was scheduled to fight Damjan Savanović. Stanič defeated Savanović by unanimous decision.

== Titles and achievements ==
- Professional:
  - 2011 KOTR World Cruiserweight Champion (-90 kg)
  - 2010 WBC Muaythai World Champion (-86.363 kg)
- Amateur:
  - 2016 Croatian Senior Kickboxing Championships (silver) -91 kg (low kick rules)
  - 2016 Croatian Senior Kickboxing Championships (gold) -94 kg (kick light rules)
  - 2008 Croatian Senior Kickboxing Championships (gold) -86 kg (K-1 rules)
  - 2007 W.A.K.O. World Championships (silver) -86 kg (K-1)
  - 2007 Croatian Senior Kickboxing Championships (gold) -91 kg (low kick rules)
  - 2006 W.A.K.O. European Championships low-kick (bronze) (-91 kg) (low-kick)
  - 2005 Croatian Senior Kickboxing Championships (gold) -91 kg (low kick rules)

== Kickboxing record ==
Professional kickboxing record
32 wins (13 (T)KOs), 12 losses
Date	Result	Opponent	Event	Location	Method	Round	Time
2018-11-03	Win	(Bosnia and Herzegovina) Damjan Savanović	Opatija Fight Night X	Opatija, Croatia	Decision (unanimous)	3	3:00
2017-09-16	Win	(Slovenia) Denis Chorchyp	W5 Legends Collide	Koper, Slovenia	Decision (unanimous)	3	3:00
2016-10-08	Win	(Bosnia and Herzegovina) Danilo Tošić	Bilić-Erić Security Fight Night 8	Zagreb, Croatia	Decision (unanimous)	3	3:00
2016-07-30	Win	(Italy) Samuele Canonico	Opatija Fight Night 7	Opatija, Croatia	Decision	3	3:00
2015-10-31	Win	(Moldova) Ricu Beleniuc	Opatija Fight Night 6	Opatija, Croatia	Decision	3	3:00
2015-09-27	Loss	(Czech Republic) Jiri Zak	ISKA Fight Night	Brno, Czech Republic	TKO	3	
For the ISKA World Cruiserweight (-88.5 kg/194 lb) Muay Thai Championship.
2014-12-20	Loss	(Bosnia and Herzegovina) Bahrudin Mahmić	FFC Super Final	Opatija, Croatia	Decision (split)	3	3:00
2014-03-01	Loss	(Netherlands) Patrick Van Rees	FFC Futures 1	Opatija, Croatia	KO (right cross)	1	2:00
2013-11-15	Win	(Serbia) Strahinja Ivanović	FFC09: McSweeney vs. Traunmuller	Ljubljana, Slovenia	TKO (low kick)	2	1:30
2013-05-24	Loss	(Bosnia and Herzegovina) Igor Emkić	FFC05: Rodriguez vs. Simonjič	Osijek, Croatia	KO (left hook)	3	1:52
2013-02-23	Win	(Belgium) Laurent Attrifi	SUPERKOMBAT New Heroes 1	Opatija, Croatia	Decision (majority)	3	3:00
2012-12-02	Loss	(Slovenia) Tadej Toplak	Enfusion 3: Trial of the Gladiators	Ljubljana, Slovenia	Decision	3	3:00
2012-10-27	Win	(Armenia) Hracho Darpinyan	Bajić Team & Ameno Fight Night	Split, Croatia	TKO (low kicks)	2	
2012-08-18	Loss	(Slovenia) Franci Grajš	Admiral Markets Fight Night	Portorož, Slovenia	Decision (split)	3	3:00
2012-05-12	Loss	(Romania) Bogdan Stoica	SUPERKOMBAT World Grand Prix II 2012	Cluj-Napoca, Romania	Decision (unanimous)	3	3:00
For the vacant SUPERKOMBAT Cruiserweight Championship.
2012-02-24	Win	(Serbia) Vidak Mravalj	Opatija Fight Night 4	Opatija, Croatia	TKO (ref. stop/right low kick)	2	
2011-08-13	Loss	(Belarus) Vitali Akhramenko	Fight Code: Rhinos Series, Final 16 (Part 3), Super Fight	Debrecen, Hungary	Majority decision	3	3:00
2011-02-20	Win	(Netherlands) Rodney Glunder	Opatija Fight Night 3	Opatija, Croatia	Decision (unanimous)	5	3:00
Wins KOTR cruiserweight (-90kg) title.
2010-12-10	Win	(Bosnia and Herzegovina) Đemal Mahmić	Podgorica Fight Night	Podgorica, Montenegro	TKO (low kicks)	2	1:22
2010-02-12	Win	(France) Frédérique Bellonie	Opatija Fight Night 2	Opatija, Croatia	Decision (majority)	5	3:00
Wins WBC Muaythai World cruiserweight (190lbs/86.363kg) title.
2009-02-10	Win	(Slovenia) Kos Klemen	Opatija Fight Night 1	Opatija, Croatia	TKO	2	2:17
2009-10-16	Draw	(Slovakia) Tomaš Šenkyr	Return of the Gladiators	Brno, Czech Republic	Decision (draw)	5	3:00
Jury declared Stanić as the best fighter of the tournament among 32 fighters.
2008-10-18	Win	(Hungary) Laszlo Racz	Opatija Challenger 2008	Opatija, Croatia	TKO	2	1:54
2008-07-04	Loss	(Russia) Stanislav Popov	PFAMT Muaythai event	Blagoveshchensk, Russia	Decision	5	3:00
2007-08-04	Win	(Bosnia and Herzegovina) Sven Plivičević	Bilić – Erić Security Night 2	Rijeka, Croatia	KO	2	
2007-04-25	Win	(Bosnia and Herzegovina) Denis Marjanović	Bilić Fight Night	Zagreb, Croatia	Decision (unanimous)	3	3:00
2007-04-25	Win	(Croatia) Stipe Stipetić	Kickboxing – Free Fight Night	Pula, Croatia	TKO (medical intervention)	2	2:41
2006-05-13	Loss	(Bosnia and Herzegovina) Bojan Glavaš	Gold Liga – Bjelovarska noć kickboxinga	Bjelovar, Croatia	Decision (split)	3	3:00
2006-04-07	Loss	(Bosnia and Herzegovina) Bojan Glavaš	Noć Šampiona	Banja Luka, Bosnia and Herzegovina	Decision (unanimous)	3	3:00
2005-07-22	Loss	(Croatia) Igor Jurković	Gold Liga	Mali Lošinj, Croatia			
2005-05-14	Win	(Bosnia and Herzegovina) Bojan Glavaš	King of the Ring	Banja Luka, Bosnia and Herzegovina	KO	2	1:45
Legend: Win Loss Draw/no contest Notes

Amateur kickboxing record
Date	Result	Opponent	Event	Location	Method	Round	Time
2017-07-26	Loss	(Russia) Igor Darmeskhin	World Combat Games, Low kick, Quarter Finals -91 kg	Wrocław, Poland	3:0	3	2:00
2016-10-27	Loss	(Moldova) Pavel Voronin	W.A.K.O European Championships 2016, K-1 Quarter Finals -91 kg	Maribor, Slovenia	1:2	3	2:00
2016-10-26	Win	(Belarus) Aliaksandr Baranouski	W.A.K.O European Championships 2016, K-1 First round -91 kg	Maribor, Slovenia	3:0	3	2:00
2016-04-30	Loss	(Croatia) Toni Čatipović	Croatian Kickboxing Championship, L-K Final -91 kg	Poreč, Croatia	1:2	3	2:00
Wins Croatian Kickboxing Championships '16 L-K Silver Medal -91 kg.
2016-04-30	Win	(Croatia) Nino Tolić	Croatian Kickboxing Championship, L-K Semi Finals -91 kg	Poreč, Croatia	3:0	3	2:00
2016-04-09	Win	(Croatia) Zoran Miloš	Croatian Kickboxing Championship, KL Final -94 kg	Opatija, Croatia	3:0	3	2:00
Wins Croatian Kickboxing Championships '16 KL Gold Medal -94 kg.
2016-04-09	Win	(Croatia) Ivo Harambašić	Croatian Kickboxing Championship, KL Semi Finals -94 kg	Opatija, Croatia	2:1	3	2:00
2016-04-09	Win	(Croatia) Marino Šestan	Croatian Kickboxing Championship, KL Quarter Finals -94 kg	Opatija, Croatia	0:0	3	2:00
2007-09-30	Loss	(Bosnia and Herzegovina) Dženan Poturak	W.A.K.O World Championships 2007, K-1 Final -91 kg	Belgrade, Serbia	Decision (split)	3	2:00
Wins W.A.K.O. World Championship '07 K-1 Silver Medal -86 kg.
2007-09-29	Win	(Belarus) Siarhei Krauchanka	W.A.K.O World Championships 2007, K-1 Semi Final -86 kg	Belgrade, Serbia	Decision (unanimous)	3	2:00
2007-09-??	Win	(Austria) Aly Staubmann	W.A.K.O World Championships 2007, K-1 Quarter Finals -86 kg	Belgrade, Serbia	Decision (unanimous)	3	2:00
2006-11-23	Loss	(Serbia) Dejan Milosavljević	W.A.K.O. European Championships 2006, Low Kick Semi Finals -91 kg	Skopje, Macedonia	Decision (unanimous)	3	3:00
Wins 2006 W.A.K.O. European Championship Low Kick Bronze Medal -91 kg.
2006-11-22	Win	(Bulgaria) Kolev Krasimir	W.A.K.O. European Championships 2006, Low Kick Quarter Finals -91 kg	Skopje, Macedonia	Decision (unanimous)	3	3:00
Legend: Win Loss Draw/no contest Notes

== See also ==
- List of WAKO Amateur World Championships
- List of WAKO Amateur European Championships
- List of male kickboxers
