= 2016 in Wu Lin Feng =

Chinese kickboxing events

Information
- Last date: N/A

Events
- Total events: N/A

Fights

Chronology
2015 in Wu Lin Feng	2016 in Wu Lin Feng	2017 in Wu Lin Feng

The year 2016 is the 16th year in the history of the Wu Lin Feng, a Chinese kickboxing promotion. Events are broadcast on Henan Television every Saturday 21:15.

== List of events ==
No.	Event	Date	Venue	City
	Wu Lin Feng 2016: WLF x Krush - China vs Japan	December 3, 2016		Zhengzhou, China
	Wu Lin Feng 2016: WLF x Mix Fight Gala 20 - China vs Europe	December 3, 2016	Fraport Arena	Frankfurt, Germany
	Wu Lin Feng 2016: China vs USA	November 17, 2016	The Orleans	Las Vegas, United States
	Wu Lin Feng 2016: WLF x KO Fighters Series 2 - China vs Spain	October 29, 2016	Palacio de Deportes de San Pedro Alcántara	Marbella, Spain
	Wu Lin Feng 2016: WLF x KF1	October 14, 2016		Hong Kong
	Wu Lin Feng 2016: World Kickboxing Championship in Shenzhen	September 09, 2016		Shenzhen, China
	Wu Lin Feng 2016: Netherlands VS China	September 03, 2016	Henan TV Studio 8	Zhengzhou, China
	Wu Lin Feng 2016: WFL x Fight League - China vs Morocco	August 04, 2016	Hall Ziaten Tanger	Tangier, Morocco

== Wu Lin Feng 2016: World Kickboxing Championship in Shanghai ==
Wu Lin Feng 2016: World Kickboxing Championship in Shanghai was held on January 23, 2016 in Shanghai, China.

=== Results ===
Main Card
Weight Class				Method	Round	Time	Notes
-70kg	(Italy) Giorgio Petrosyan	def.	(China) Jiao Fukai	TKO (Towel Throw)	3
-80kg	(China) Fang Bian	def.	(France) Cedric Doumbe	Ext.R Decision (Split)	4	3:00
-70kg	(China) Yi Long	def.	(Iran) Seyedisa Alamdarnezam	Decision	3	3:00
-63kg	(China) Wei Rui	def.	(Thailand) Pakorn P.K. Saenchai Muaythaigym	Decision (Unanimous)	3	3:00
-67kg	(Thailand) Jomthong Chuwattana	def.	(China) Deng Zeqi	KO (Left CCross)	1
-67kg	(China) Yang Zhuo	def.	(United Kingdom) Craig Dickson	KO (Right Hook)	1
-67kg	(China) Qiu Jianliang	def.	(Belarus) Andrei Kulebin	KO (Right Hook)	1	1:51	Wu Lin Feng World 8 Man Tournament Final
-67kg	(Belarus) Andrei Kulebin	def.	(China) Xie Lei	Decision (Unanimous)	3	3:00	Wu Lin Feng World 8 Man Tournament Semi Final
-67kg	(China) Qiu Jianliang	def.	(China) Lu Jianbo	TKO (Punches)	1	2:16	Wu Lin Feng World 8 Man Tournament Semi Final
-67kg	(China) Lu Jianbo	def.	(Armenia) Melsik Bagdasaryan	KO	1		Wu Lin Feng World 8 Man Tournament Quarter Final
-67kg	(China) Xie Lei	def.	(Japan) UMA	Decision (Unanimous)	3	3:00	Wu Lin Feng World 8 Man Tournament Quarter Final
-67kg	(Belarus) Andrei Kulebin	def.	(China) Feng Jie	Ext.R Decision (Unanimous)	4	3:00	Wu Lin Feng World 8 Man Tournament Quarter Final
-67kg	(China) Qiu Jianliang	def.	(Australia) Nathan Robson	Decision (Unanimous)	3	3:00	Wu Lin Feng World 8 Man Tournament Quarter Final

== Wu Lin Feng 2016: WFL x Fight League - China vs Morocco ==
Wu Lin Feng 2016: WFL x Fight League - China vs Morocco
- Promotion: Wu Lin Feng, Fight League
- Date: August 04, 2016
- Venue: Hall Ziaten Tanger
- City: Tangier, Morocco

Wu Lin Feng 2016: WFL x Fight League - China vs Morocco was a kickboxing event held on Ausgut 04, 2016 in Tangier, Morocco.

=== Results ===
Main Card
Weight Class				Method	Round	Time	Notes
Kickboxing -67kg	(Morocco) Azize Hlali	def.	(China) Qiu Jianliang	Decision	3	3:00	Fight League -67kg Championship Fight
Kickboxing -67kg	(Morocco) Yassin Baitar	def.	(China) Ji Changwei	KO (Punches)	2
Kickboxing -65kg	(Morocco) Zakaria Zouggary	def.	(China) Wang Zhiwei	TKO (Corner Stoppage)	3
Kickboxing -67kg	(China) Xie Lei	def.	(Morocco) Walid Hamid	KO
Kickboxing	(Morocco) Youssef El Haji	def.	(China) Lu Jianbo	Decision	3	3:00
Kickboxing	(Morocco) Soufiane Taouati	def.	(China) Li Yankun	Decision	3	3:00
Kickboxing	(Morocco) Youssef Satouti	def.	(China) Wang Jingwei	KO
Kickboxing	(Morocco) Ilias Boukayou	def.	(China) Li Zikai	KO
Kickboxing	(Morocco) Ilyass Chakir	def.	(China) Wu Sihan	Decision	3	3:00
Kickboxing	(China) Hao Dhengbin	def.	(Morocco) Mohammed Lazrak	KO

== Wu Lin Feng 2016: China vs Australia ==
Wu Lin Feng 2016: China vs Australia
- Promotion: Wu Lin Feng
- Date: August 27, 2016
- Venue: Hordern Pavilion
- City: Sydney, Australia

Wu Lin Feng 2016: China vs Australia was a kickboxing event held on Ausgut 27, 2016 in Sydney, Australia.

=== Results ===
Main Card
Weight Class				Method	Round	Time	Notes
Kickboxing -70kg	(China) Yi Long	def.	(Australia) Franz Sanchez	TKO	1
Kickboxing -63kg	(China) Wang Zhiwei	def.	(Australia) Matt Cashmore	TKO
Kickboxing -68kg	(Australia) Hussein Al Mansouri	def.	(China) Han Wenbao	Decision	3	3:00
Kickboxing -75kg	(Australia) Marco Tentori	def.	(China) Yang Kunshan	Decision	3	3:00
Kickboxing -80kg	(Australia) Areta Gilbert	def.	(China) Liu Dacheng	Decision	3	3:00
Kickboxing -63kg	(Australia) Joey Concha	def.	(China) Jin Ying	Decision (Split)	3	3:00
Kickboxing -65kg	(China) Miao Wei	def.	(Australia) Benny Thompson	Decision	3	3:00
Kickboxing -60kg	(China) Li Ning	Draw.	(Australia) Josh Tonna	Decision	3	3:00
Kickboxing -69kg	(China) Xie Lei	vs.	(Australia) Nathan Robson
Kickboxing -80kg	(China) Wang Zhiguo	vs.	(Australia) Bradley Traynor

== Wu Lin Feng 2016: Netherlands VS China ==
Wu Lin Feng 2016: Netherlands VS China
- Promotion: Wu Lin Feng
- Date: September 03, 2016
- Venue: Henan TV Studio 8
- City: Zhengzhou, China

Wu Lin Feng 2016: Netherlands VS China was a kickboxing event held on September 03, 2016 in Zhengzhou, China.

=== Results ===
Main Card
Weight Class				Method	Round	Time	Notes
Kickboxing -70kg	(Germany) Enriko Kehl	def.	(China) Ji Xiang	TKO	2		WLF -70kg Championship Tournament Quarter Final
Kickboxing -90kg	(China) Hao Guanghua	def.	(Netherlands) Sergio Pique	Decision	3	3:00
Kickboxing -77kg	(Netherlands) Santino Verbeek	def.	(China) Liu Yuan	Decision	3	3:00
Kickboxing -70kg	(China) Ji Xiang	def.	(Korea) Gwan Woo Kim	Decision	3	3:00	WLF -70kg Championship Tournament 1/8 Final
Kickboxing -70kg	(Germany) Enriko Kehl	def.	(China) Zhao Yan	Decision	3	3:00	WLF -70kg Championship Tournament 1/8 Final
Kickboxing -68kg	(Netherlands) Hasan Toy	def.	(China) Yang Yulong	TKO (Front Kick)	1
Kickboxing -63kg	(China) Jin Ying	def.	(Netherlands) Ilias El Hajoui	Decision	3	3:00
Kickboxing Women -57kg	(China) Huang Li	def.	(Netherlands) Naomi Tataroglu Sibel	Decision	3	3:00
Kickboxing -75kg	(Turkey) Onder Ural	def.	(China) Sun Weiqiang	Decision	3	3:00
Kickboxing -71kg	(China) Hu Yafei	def.	(Netherlands) Romano Bakboord	Decision	3	3:00
Kickboxing -71kg	(China) Jiao Fukai	def.	(Netherlands) Fernando Reemnet	TKO
Kickboxing -60kg	(China) Lei Penghui	vs.	(Thailand) Kunbut
Kickboxing -68kg	(China) Chen Yage	vs.	(Netherlands) Damian Johansen

== Wu Lin Feng 2016: World Kickboxing Championship in Shenzhen ==
Wu Lin Feng 2016: World Kickboxing Championship in Shenzhen was held on September 10, 2016 in Shenzhen, China.

=== Results ===
Main Card
Weight Class				Method	Round	Time	Notes
-70kg	(China) Yi Long	def.	(Japan) Masato Uchiyama	Decision	3	3:00
-90kg	(China) Hao Guanghua	def.	John Chapas	TKO	2
-80kg	(China) Fang Bian	def.	(Germany) Vadalma Weber	Decision (Unanimous)	3	3:00
-75kg	(China) Guo Xichuang	def.	(New Zealand) Alexander	Decision	3	3:00
-60kg	(China) Zhao Chongyang	vs.	(Belarus) Dzianis Klimovich	Decision	3	3:00
-60kg	(China) Wu Huiqiang	def.	(Japan) Shoya Masumoto	KO (Punches)	2
Kickboxing	(China) Sun Weipeng	def.	(New Zealand) Carlos Hicks	Decision	3	3:00
Kickboxing	(Belarus) Farkhad Akhmejanau	def.	(China) Song Shaoqiu	Decision	3	3:00
Kickboxing	(China) Miao Wei	def.	Edward	KO
Kickboxing	(China) Ren Xuehan	def.	(Spain)

== Wu Lin Feng 2016: WLF x KF1 ==
Wu Lin Feng 2016: WLF x KF1
- Promotion: Wu Lin Feng, KF1
- Date: October 14, 2016
- City: Hong Kong

Wu Lin Feng 2016: WLF x KF1 was a kickboxing event held on October 14, 2016 in Hong Kong.

=== Results ===
Main Card
Weight Class				Method	Round	Time	Notes
Kickboxing -62kg	(China) Jin Ying	vs.	(Thailand) Payanoi				WLF -62kg Intercontinental Final
Kickboxing -54kg	Fighter 1	vs.	Fighter 2				WLF -54kg Intercontinental Final
Kickboxing -70kg	(China) Xiong Ziqiang	vs.	(Spain) Antonio Gomez
Kickboxing -68kg	(China) Xie Lei	vs.	(United States) William Wayne
Kickboxing -65kg	(China) Miao Wei	vs.	(United States) Khyzer Hayat
Kickboxing -61kg	(China) Zhang Lanpei	def.	(Thailand) Chanchai	Decision (Unanimous)	3	3:00
Kickboxing -57kg	(China) Wang Junguang	def.	(Thailand) Phetkiangkrai Tor.Silachai	Decision	3	3:00
Kickboxing -57kg	(Hong Kong) Chung Chan	vs.	(Korea) Choe Seung Gyu
Kickboxing -52kg	(Hong Kong) Tung Lam	vs.	(Korea) Chooi Seok Hee
Kickboxing -48kg	(China) Tik Chan	vs.	(Thailand) Ziada
Kickboxing -62kg	(Thailand) Payanoi	def.	(Hong Kong) Anson Chin	Decision	3	3:00	WLF -62kg Intercontinental Semi Final
Kickboxing -62kg	(China) Jin Ying	def.	(Netherlands) Reda Narain	Decision	3	3:00	WLF -62kg Intercontinental Semi Final
Kickboxing -54kg	(Hong Kong) Lok Chan	vs.	(Korea) Yoon Deok Jae				WLF -54kg Intercontinental Semi Final
Kickboxing -54kg	(Hong Kong) Leung Pak Yu	vs.	(Thailand) Surasit				WLF -54kg Intercontinental Semi Final

== Wu Lin Feng 2016: WLF x KO Fighters Series 2 - China vs Spain ==
Wu Lin Feng 2016: WLF x KO Fighters Series 2 - China vs Spain
- Promotion: Wu Lin Feng, KO Fighters Series
- Date: October 29, 2016
- City: Marbella, Spain

Wu Lin Feng 2016: WLF x KO Fighters Series 2 - China vs Spain was a kickboxing event held on October 29, 2016 in Marbella, Spain.

=== Results ===
Main Card
Weight Class				Method	Round	Time	Notes
Kickboxing -63kg	(Spain) Daniel Puertas Gallardo	def.	(Suriname) Sergio Wielzen	Decision	3	3:00	WLF -60kg title fight
Kickboxing -63kg	(Spain) Sergio Cabezas	def.	(China) Wang Zhiwei	Decision	3	3:00	KO Fighters Prestige title
Kickboxing -70kg	(Spain) Adan Martins	def.	(China) Wu Jianan	Decision	3	3:00
Kickboxing -75kg	(Spain) Alejandro Mostazo	def.	(China) Wu Sihan	Decision	3	3:00
Kickboxing -69kg	(China) Song Shaoqiu	def.	(Spain) Issam Chadid	Decision	3	3:00
Kickboxing -70kg	(Spain) Antonio Gomez	def.	(China) Zhao Yan	Decision	3	3:00
Kickboxing -64kg	(Spain) Khyzer Hayat	def.	(Hong Kong) Chin Ngaichung	Decision	3	3:00

== Wu Lin Feng 2016: Fight of the Century 2 ==
Wu Lin Feng 2016: Fight of the Century 2
- Promotion: Wu Lin Feng
- Date: November 05, 2016
- City: China

Wu Lin Feng 2016: Fight of the Century 2 was a kickboxing event held on November 05, 2016 in Zhengzhou, China.

=== Results ===
Main Card
Weight Class				Method	Round	Time	Notes
Kickboxing -70kg	(China) Yi Long	def.	(Thailand) Buakaw Banchamek (c)	Decision	3	3:00	WLF -70kg Championship Fight
Kickboxing -77kg	(South Africa) Vuyisile Colossa	def.	(China) Zheng Zhaoyu	Ext.R Decision	4	3:00
Kickboxing -65kg	(Thailand) Changpuek MuaythaiAcademy	def.	(China) Miao Wei	Decision	3	3:00
Kickboxing -75kg	(Belarus) Farkhad Akhmejanau	def.	(China) Hang Wesong	Decision	3	3:00
Kickboxing -63kg	(China) Jin Ying	def.	(Thailand) Phetmorakot Adison	Decision	3	3:00
Kickboxing -63kg	(Belgium) Hicham Moujtahid	def.	(China) Chen Sai	Decision	3	3:00
Kickboxing -90kg	(China) Hao Gunaghua	def.	(New Zealand) Brandon
Kickboxing	(China) Li Yinggang	vs.	(Russia) Shamil
Kickboxing	(China) Liu Qiliang	vs.	(Netherlands) El Hani

== Wu Lin Feng 2016: China vs USA ==
Wu Lin Feng 2016: China vs USA was held on November 17, 2016 in Las Vegas.

=== Results ===
Main Card
Weight Class				Method	Round	Time
-73.5kg	(United States) Josh Aragon	def.	(China) Ma Shou	Decision (Unanimous)	3	3:00
-67kg	(China) Wang Pengfei	def.	(United States) Joseph Pagliuso	TKO	3
-67kg	(Armenia) Melsik Baghdasaryan	def.	(China) Wei Ninghui	Decision (Unanimous)	3	3:00
-58kg	(United States) Adam Rothweiler	def.	(Hong Kong) Chan Chi Cheung	Decision (Unanimous)	3	3:00
-63kg	(United States) Joseph Gogo	def.	(China) Jin Ying	Decision (Unanimous)	3	3:00
-75kg	(China) Sun Weichao	def.	(United States) David Pacheco	Decision (Unanimous)	3	3:00
-80kg	(China) Wang Zhiguo	def.	(United States) Daniel Kerr	Decision (Split)	3	3:00
-80kg	(China) Duoli Chen	def.	(Slovakia) Michal Tomko	KO	2
-48kg	(Hong Kong) Chan Kai Tik	def.	(United States) Joe Le Maire	Decision (Unanimous)	3	3:00

== Wu Lin Feng 2016: WLF x Krush - China vs Japan ==
Wu Lin Feng 2016: WLF x Krush - China vs Japan
- Promotion: Wu Lin Feng
- Date: December 03, 2016
- City: China

Wu Lin Feng 2016: WLF x Krush - China vs Japan was a kickboxing event held on December 03, 2016 in Zhengzhou, China.

=== Results ===
Main Card
Weight Class				Method	Round	Time	Notes
Kickboxing -67kg	(Morocco) Ilias Bulaid	def.	(China) Xie Lei	Decision (Unanimous)	3	3:00
Kickboxing -67kg	(China) Yang Zhuo	def.	(Japan) Waki Mitsuharu	Decision (Unanimous)	3	3:00
Kickboxing -72kg	(Japan) Shintaro Matsukura	def.	(China) Zhao Yan	Decision (Unanimous)	3	3:00
Kickboxing -60kg	(Japan) Taiga	def.	(China) Chen Wende	Decision (Unanimous)	3	3:00
Kickboxing Women -53kg	(China) Ren Kailin	def.	(Japan) Tomoko	Decision (Unanimous)	3	3:00
Kickboxing -66kg	(China) Wang Pengfei	def.	(Japan) Hiromitsu Miyagi	TKO	2
Kickboxing -63kg	(China) Jin Ying	def.	(Japan) Keisuke Nakamura	Decision (Unanimous)	3	3:00
Kickboxing -58kg	(Japan) Haruma Saikyo	def.	(China) Chen Qicong	Decision (Unanimous)	3	3:00
Kickboxing +100kg	(Suriname) Jairzinho Rozenstruik	def.	(Suriname) Donegi Abena	KO	1		Heavyweight Final
Kickboxing -70kg	Fighter 1	vs.	Fighter 2				70kg Final
Kickboxing -60kg	(China) Zhu Shuai	def.	(Belarus) Eduard Mikhovich	Decision	3	3:00
Kickboxing -63kg	(China) Fang Feida	def.	(Gabon) Admilson Semedo	TKO (Punches)	2
Kickboxing +100kg	(Suriname) Jairzinho Rozenstruik	def.	(China) Song Liyuan	Decision (Unanimous)	3	3:00	Heavyweight Semi Final
Kickboxing +100kg	(Suriname) Donegi Abena	def.	(Belarus) Petr Romankevich	Decision	3	3:00	Heavyweight Semi Final
Kickboxing -70kg	(China) Xiong Ziqiang	vs.	(Netherlands) Hicham Boubkari				70kg Semi Final
Kickboxing -70kg	(China) Jiao Fukai	vs.	(Japan) Go Aoyagi				70kg Semi Final

== Wu Lin Feng 2016: WLF x Mix Fight Gala 20 - China vs Europe ==
Wu Lin Feng 2016: WLF x Mix Fight Gala 20 - China vs Europe
- Promotion: Wu Lin Feng
- Date: December 03, 2016
- City: China

Wu Lin Feng 2016: WLF x Mix Fight Gala 20 - China vs Europe was a kickboxing event held on December 03, 2016 in Frankfurt, Germany.

=== Results ===
Main Card
Weight Class				Method	Round	Time	Notes
Kickboxing +100kg	(Netherlands) Errol Zimmerman	def.	(Germany) Viktor Bogutski	TKO	3
Kickboxing -70kg	(Russia) Vlad Tuinov	def.	(China) Wu Jiahan	KO	3
Kickboxing -70kg	(Germany) Enriko Kehl	def.	(China) Song Shaoqiu	Decision (Unanimous)	3	3:00
Kickboxing -80kg	(Germany) Samir Al Mansouri	def.	(China) Chen Yawei	KO	1
Kickboxing -95kg	(Turkey) Atilla Tuluk	def.	(Germany) Jerme Heinz	TKO	1
Kickboxing +100kg	(Turkey) Murat Aygun	def.	(Morocco) Tarik Khbabez	Ext.R Decision (Majority)	4	3:00	Mix Gala Heavyweight title fight
Kickboxing -72.5kg	(Albania) Shemsi Beqiri	def.	(Turkey) Erkan Varol	Decision	3	3:00
Kickboxing -78kg	(Netherlands) Regian Eersel	def.	(China) Liu Dacheng	KO	1
Kickboxing -81kg	(Turkey) Atakan Arslan	def.	(Suriname) Marco Pique	Decision (Unanimous)	3	3:00
Kickboxing -65kg	(United States) Kaitlin Young	def.	(Germany) Johanna Kruse	Decision (Split)	3	3:00
Muay Thai -67kg	(Germany) Juri Kehl	def.	(China) Liang Shoutao	KO	1
Kickboxing -69kg	(China) Wang Tengyue	def.	(Italy) Angelo Inparaj	Decision (Unanimous)	3	3:00
Kickboxing -78kg	(Germany) Sergej Braun	def.	(Switzerland) Philipp Hafeli	TKO	2
Kickboxing -63.5kg	(China) Wang Zhiwei	def.	(Colombia) Joan M. Lique Canaveral	Decision (Split)	3	3:00
Kickboxing -76kg	(Iran) Akam Tarageh	def.	(China) Sun Weipeng	Decision (Unanimous)	3	3:00
Muay Thai -61kg	(China) Wang Wenfeng	def.	(Suriname) Sergio Wielzen	Decision (Split)
Kickboxing -75kg	(Poland) Bartosz Zajac	def.	(China) Wang Hesong	Decision (Split)	3	3:00

== See also ==
- 2016 in Glory
- 2016 in K-1
- 2016 in Glory of Heroes
- 2016 in Kunlun Fight
