= HNTV =

HNTV may also refer to:

- Hanoi Radio Television
- Hunan Television
- Henan Television
