= Wu Lin Feng =

Chinese mixed martial arts show

- Native name: 武林风
- Industry: Kickboxing and MMA promotion
- Founded: 2004
- Founder: Wu Lixin
- Headquarters: Zhengzhou, Henan
- Owner: Henan Television

Wu Lin Feng (simplified Chinese: 武林风; traditional Chinese: 武林風; pinyin: wǔlín fēng), also known as WLF, is a martial arts competition televised by Henan Television. It is the longest running martial arts program in China.

Since 2007 the competition has become more international in nature, bringing in more challengers from other countries and filming bouts abroad, including in Germany, New Zealand and in the United States. Participants have included K-1 fighters, mixed martial arts professionals, Muay Thai fighters and wushu and sanda practitioners. In 2013, it was ranked among the top 100 most viewed satellite and cable television programs in China.

It has a partnership with Golden Fighter Championship (GFC) of Romania since 2017.

== History ==
=== 2017 ===
In 2017 held the first "2017 WLF China-Canada Kickboxing Championship" on May 16, 2017.

=== 2016 ===
2016 Wu Lin Feng launched MMA events under the name E.P.I.C. (simplified Chinese: 武林笼中对; traditional Chinese: 武林籠中對; pinyin: wǔ lín lǒng zhōng duì) which stood for Elimination Power In Cage. Its name is a homophone of the historical "Longzhong Dui", while its literal meaning is 'a duel in the (octagon) cage'.

E.P.I.C was broadcast on Fridays at 21:20 on Henan Television in 2015 and 2016. In 2017 the events were renamed to W.A.R.S. which stands for Warriors arena of ruthless submission. In 2018 it was moved to be broadcast on Tuesdays.

=== 2015 ===
2015 Wu Lin Feng launched a new event called New Generation (Chinese: 拳新一代; pinyin: quán xīn yī dài) New Generation is a youth kickboxing tournament for the purpose of finding new talent.

== List of events ==
Event	Date	Venue	City
Wu Lin Feng 2020: King's Super Cup Final	October 18, 2020		Zhengzhou, China
Wu Lin Feng	October 16, 2020		Zhengzhou, China
Wu Lin Feng 2020: King's Super Cup 5th Group Stage	September 23, 2020		Zhengzhou, China
Wu Lin Feng 2020: China New Kings Tournament Final	August 29, 2020		Zhengzhou, China
Wu Lin Feng 2020: King's Super Cup 4th Group Stage	August 3, 2020		Zhengzhou, China
Wu Lin Feng 2020: King's Super Cup 3rd Group Stage	July 5, 2020		Zhengzhou, China
Wu Lin Feng 2020: King's Super Cup 2nd Group Stage	June 13, 2020		Zhengzhou, China
Wu Lin Feng 2020: King's Super Cup 1st Group Stage	May 15, 2020		Zhengzhou, China
Wu Lin Feng 2020: WLF World Championship in Baise	January 18, 2020		Baise, China
Wu Lin Feng 2020: WLF World Cup 2019-2020 Final	January 11, 2020		Zhuhai, China
Wu Lin Feng 2019: WLF -67kg World Cup 2019-2020 6th Group Stage	November 30, 2019		Zhengzhou, China
Wu Lin Feng 2019: WLF -67kg World Cup 2019-2020 5th Group Stage	October 26, 2019		Zhengzhou, China
Wu Lin Feng 2019: WLF in Manila	October 23, 2019		Manila, Philippines
Wu Lin Feng 2019: WLF -67kg World Cup 2019-2020 4th Group Stage	September 28, 2019		Zhengzhou, China
Wu Lin Feng 2019: WLF China vs Russia	September 20, 2019		Moscow, Russia
Wu Lin Feng 2019: WLF at Lumpinee - China vs Thailand	September 6, 2019	Lumpinee Stadium	Bangkok, Thailand
Wu Lin Feng 2019: WLF -67kg World Cup 2019-2020 3rd Group Stage	August 31, 2019		Zhengzhou, China
Wu Lin Feng 2019: WLF -67kg World Cup 2019-2020 2nd Group Stage	July 27, 2019		Zhengzhou, China
Wu Lin Feng 2019: WLF x Krush 103 - China vs Japan	July 21, 2019	Korakuen Hall	Tokyo, Japan
Wu Lin Feng 2019: WLF -67kg World Cup 2019-2020 1st Group Stage	June 29, 2019		Zhengzhou, China
Wu Lin Feng 2019: China vs Canada & 70kg World Championship Tournament	May 25, 2019	Henan TV Studio 8	Zhengzhou, China
Wu Lin Feng 2019: WLF -63kg Championship World Tournament	April 27, 2019		Zhuhai, China
Wu Lin Feng 2019: WLF China vs Estonia	April 13, 2019		Tallinn, Estonia
Wu Lin Feng 2019: WLF x Lumpinee - China vs Thailand	March 30, 2019		Zhengzhou, China
Wu Lin Feng 2019: WLF x Gods of War XII - China vs Greece	March 24, 2019		Athens, Greece
Wu Lin Feng 2019: WLF Championship in Zhengzhou	February 23, 2019	Henan TV Studio 8	Zhengzhou, China
Wu Lin Feng 2019: WLF World Cup 2018-2019 Final	January 19, 2019		Haikou, China
Wu Lin Feng 2019: WLF -65kg World Championship Tournament	January 2, 2019	Hengqin International Tennis Center	Zhuhai, China
Wu Lin Feng 2018: WLF x S1 - China vs Thailand	December 8, 2018		Thailand
Wu Lin Feng 2018: WLF -67kg World Cup 2018-2019 6th Round	December 1, 2018		Zhengzhou, China
Wu Lin Feng 2018: WLF x KF1	November 7, 2018		Hong Kong
Wu Lin Feng 2018: China vs Australia	November 4, 2018	Melbourne Convention Exhibition Center	Melbourne, Australia
Wu Lin Feng 2018: WLF -67kg World Cup 2018-2019 5th Round	November 3, 2018		China
Wu Lin Feng 2018: China vs Canada	October 14, 2018	Pan Am Sports Center	Markham, Ontario, Canada
Wu Lin Feng 2018: WLF -67kg World Cup 2018-2019 4th Round	October 6, 2018		Shangqiu, China
Wu Lin Feng 2018: WLF -67kg World Cup 2018-2019 3rd Round	September 1, 2018		Zhengzhou, China
Wu Lin Feng 2018: WLF x OSS Fighters - China vs Romania	August 24, 2018	Piateta Cazino	Mamaia, Romania
Wu Lin Feng 2018: WLF -67kg World Cup 2018-2019 2nd Round	August 4, 2018		Zhengzhou, China
Wu Lin Feng 2018: WLF x Krush 90 - China vs Japan	July 22, 2018	Korakuen Hall	Tokyo, Japan
Wu Lin Feng 2018: WLF -67kg World Cup 2018-2019 1st Round	July 7, 2018	Henan Provincial Stadium	Zhengzhou, China
Wu Lin Feng 2018: China vs Netherlands & Russia	June 16, 2018	Shenyang Olympic Sports Center Stadium	Shenyang
Wu Lin Feng 2018: Yi Long VS Saiyok	June 2, 2018	Zhongxian Three Gorges harbour	Chongqing
Wu Lin Feng 2018: World Championship Yichun	May 19, 2018	Yichun Mingyue Mountain eco Garden	Yichun, Jiangxi
W.A.R.S. 24	May 11, 2018	Henan TV Studio 8	Zhengzhou, Henan
Wu Lin Feng 2018: World Championship Nanyang	May 5, 2018	Nanyang Sports Center	Nanyang, Henan
Wu Lin Feng 2018: Czech Republic VS China	April 19, 2018	Sportovni Hala Kralovka	Prague, Czech Republic
Wu Lin Feng 2018: New Generation	April 18, 2018		Shiyan
W.A.R.S. 23	April 14, 2018	Zhengzhou Shengda University	Zhengzhou, Henan
Wu Lin Feng 2018: World Championship Shijiazhuang	April 7, 2018	Hebei Gymnasium	Shijiazhuang, Hebei
Wu Lin Feng 2018: Greece VS China - Gods of War 11	March 24, 2018	Dais Sports Center Marousi	Athens, Greece
W.A.R.S. 22	March 17 and 18, 2018	People's Gymnasium	Kaifeng, Henan
Wu Lin Feng 2018: -60kg World Championship Tournament	March 10, 2018	Chenjiagou Wangting Hotel	Jiaozuo, Henan
Wu Lin Feng 2018: World Championship Tianjin	March 3, 2018	Wuqing Sports Center	Tianjin
Wu Lin Feng 2018: World Championship in Shenzhen	February 3, 2018	Luohu Gymnasium	Shenzhen, Guangdong
W.A.R.S. 21: World Championship 2018	January 13, 2018	Henan TV Studio 8	Zhengzhou, Henan
W.A.R.S. 20	December 16, 2017	Henan TV Studio 8	Zhengzhou, Henan
Wu Lin Feng 2017: China VS Canada	December 2, 2017	Henan TV Studio 8	Zhengzhou, Henan
Wu Lin Feng 2017: WCK Muaythai vs Wu Lin Feng	November 18, 2017	The Orleans Hotel & Casino	Las Vegas, United States
W.A.R.S. 19	November 11, 2017	Henan TV Studio 8	Zhengzhou, Henan
Wu Lin Feng 2017: Yi Long VS Sitthichai	November 4, 2017	Kunming Sports Center Gymnasium	Kunming, Yunnan
W.A.R.S.18	October 27, 2017	Aba Tibetan and Qiang Autonomous Prefecture	Sichuan
Wu Lin Feng 2017: World Championship Hong Kong	October 14, 2017	Wanchai Southorn Stadium	Hong Kong
Wu Lin Feng 2017: WLF VS ACB & ACB KB 11	October 7, 2017	Henan TV Studio 8	Zhengzhou, Henan
W.A.R.S. 17	September 16, 2017	Henan TV Studio 8	Zhengzhou, Henan
Wu Lin Feng 2017: World Championship Xi'an	September 2, 2017	Xi'an City Sports Park Gymnasium	Xi'an, Shaanxi
Wu Lin Feng 2017: New Zealand VS China	August 19, 2017	ASB Stadium	Auckland, New Zealand
Wu Lin Feng 2017: China VS Thailand	August 5, 2017	Henan TV Studio 8	Zhengzhou, Henan
W.A.R.S. 16	July 22, 2017	Henan TV Studio 8	Zhengzhou, Henan
Wu Lin Feng 2017: Russia VS China & ACB KB 10	July 15, 2017	Sports hall "Izmailovo"	Moscow, Russia
Wu Lin Feng 2017: China VS Spain	July 1, 2017	Henan TV Studio 8	Zhengzhou, Henan
Wu Lin Feng 2017: Australia VS China	June 24, 2017	Luna Park Sydney	Sydney, Australia
W.A.R.S. 15	June 19, 2017	Henan TV Studio 8	Zhengzhou, Henan
Wu Lin Feng 2017: Romania VS China	June 16, 2017	Sala Olimpia	Timișoara, Romania
Wu Lin Feng 2017: China VS Japan	June 3, 2017	Helong Gymnasium	Changsha, Hunan
W.A.R.S. 14	May 20, 2017	Henan TV Studio 8	Zhengzhou, Henan
Wu Lin Feng 2017: East VS West	May 16, 2017	Hershey Centre	Toronto, Canada
Wu Lin Feng 2017: China VS USA	May 6, 2017	Henan TV Studio 8	Zhengzhou, Henan
W.A.R.S. 13	April 22, 2017	Henan TV Studio 8	Zhengzhou, Henan
Wu Lin Feng 2017: Thailand VS China	April 15, 2017	Central Park Rama 2	Bangkok, Thailand
Wu Lin Feng 2017: China VS Europe	April 1, 2017	Henan TV Studio 8	Zhengzhou, Henan
W.A.R.S. 12	March 11, 2017	Henan TV Studio 8	Zhengzhou, Henan
Wu Lin Feng 2017: Kung Fu VS Muay Thai	March 4, 2017	Henan TV Studio 8	Zhengzhou, Henan
Wu Lin Feng 2017: Battle of the Golden Triangle	February 10, 2017	Golden Triangle Special Economic Zone	Bokeo Province, Laos
Wu Lin Feng World Championship 2017	January 14, 2017	Henan TV Studio 8	Zhengzhou, Henan
W.A.R.S. 11: World Championship 2017	January 6, 2017	Henan TV Studio 8	Zhengzhou, Henan
Wu Lin Feng 2016: WLF x Mix Fight Gala 20 - China vs Europe	December 3, 2016	Fraport Arena	Frankfurt, Germany
Wu Lin Feng 2016: WLF x Krush - China vs Japan	December 3, 2016		China
E.P.I.C. 10	November 26, 2016	Henan TV Studio 8	Zhengzhou, Henan
Wu Lin Feng 2016: China vs USA	November 17, 2016	The Orleans	United States, Las Vegas
Wu Lin Feng 2016: Fight of the Century 2	November 5, 2016		China
Wu Lin Feng 2016: WLF x KO Fighters Series 2 - China vs Spain	October 29, 2016	Palacio de Deportes de San Pedro Alcántara	Marbella, Spain
E.P.I.C. 9	October 24, 2016	Henan TV Studio 8	Zhengzhou, Henan
Wu Lin Feng 2016: WLF x KF1	October 14, 2016		Hong Kong
E.P.I.C. 8	September 28, 2016	Henan TV Studio 8	Zhengzhou, Henan
Wu Lin Feng 2016: World Kickboxing Championship in Shenzhen	September 10, 2016		Shenzhen, China
Wu Lin Feng 2016: Netherlands VS China	September 3, 2016	Henan TV Studio 8	Zhengzhou, Henan
Wu Lin Feng 2016: China vs Australia	August 27, 2016	Hordern Pavilion	Sydney, Australia
E.P.I.C. 7	August 20, 2016	Henan TV Studio 8	Zhengzhou, Henan
Wu Lin Feng 2016: WFL x Fight League - China vs Morocco	August 4, 2016	Hall Ziaten Tanger	Tangier, Morocco
E.P.I.C. 6	July 23, 2016	Henan TV Studio 8	Zhengzhou, Henan
E.P.I.C. 5	June 29, 2016	Henan TV Studio 8	Zhengzhou, Henan
E.P.I.C. 4	May 28, 2016	Henan TV Studio 8	Zhengzhou, Henan
E.P.I.C. 3	April 23, 2016	Henan TV Studio 8	Zhengzhou, Henan
E.P.I.C. 2	March 12, 2016	Henan TV Studio 8	Zhengzhou, Henan
Wu Lin Feng World Championship 2016	January 23, 2016	Shanghai Gymnasium	Shanghai
E.P.I.C. 1	January 13, 2016	Henan TV Studio 8	Zhengzhou, Henan
Wu Lin Feng World Championship 2015	December 12, 2015	China Agricultural University Gymnasium	Beijing
Wu Lin Feng 2015 - Germany vs China - Mix Fight Gala 19	December 5, 2015	Fraport Arena	Frankfurt, Germany
Wu Lin Feng 2015 - Thailand vs China - King's Cup 2015	December 5, 2015	Sanam Luang	Bangkok, Thailand
Wu Lin Feng World Championship 2015	December 5, 2015	Henan TV Studio 8	Zhengzhou, Henan
Wu Lin Feng 2015 - USA vs China	November 13, 2015	Hard Rock Hotel and Casino	Las Vegas, United States
Wu Lin Feng World Championship 2015	November 7, 2015	Anshan Olympic Sports Center	Anshan, Liaoning
Wu Lin Feng 2015 - New Zealand vs China	September 19, 2015	ASB Stadium	Auckland, New Zealand
Wu Lin Feng 2015 - Portugal vs China - Dynamite Fight Night 29	October 10, 2015	Pavilhão Desportivo De Olhos De Água	Albufeira, Portugal
Wu Lin Feng World Championship 2015	October 3, 2015	Henan TV Studio 8	Zhengzhou, Henan
Wu Lin Feng World Championship 2015	September 5, 2015	Guangzhou Tianhe Stadium	Guangzhou, Guangdong
Wu Lin Feng World Championship 2015	August 22, 2015	Xiamen workers' Stadium	Xiamen, Fujian
Wu Lin Feng World Championship 2015	August 1, 2015	Henan TV Studio 8	Zhengzhou, Henan
Wu Lin Feng 2015 - Australia vs China	July 18, 2015	Qantas Credit Union Arena	Sydney, Australia
Wu Lin Feng World Championship 2015	July 4, 2015	Henan TV Studio 8	Zhengzhou, Henan
Wu Lin Feng World Championship 2015	June 6, 2015	Jiyuan Basketball Arena	Jiyuan, Henan
Wu Lin Feng World Championship 2015	May 2, 2015	Xinyang Sports Center	Xinyang, Henan
Wu Lin Feng 2015 - Germany vs China - Day of Destruction 10	April 18, 2015	Sporthalle Wandsbek	Hamburg, Germany
Wu Lin Feng 2015 - Japan vs China	April 12, 2015	Yoyogi National Gymnasium	Tokyo, Japan
Wu Lin Feng World Championship 2015	April 4, 2015	Henan TV Studio 8	Zhengzhou, Henan
Wu Lin Feng 2015 - Ireland vs China	March 21, 2015	Spin Roller Arena	Dublin, Ireland
Wu Lin Feng 2015 - England vs China - KTMMA 3	March 14, 2015	ILEC Conference centre	London, United Kingdom
Wu Lin Feng World Championship 2015	March 7, 2015	Henan TV Studio 8	Zhengzhou, Henan
Wu Lin Feng World Championship 2015	January 31, 2015	Jiangnan Coliseum	Chongqing
Wu Lin Feng 2014 - King's Cup 2014	December 5, 2014	Sanam Luang	Bangkok, Thailand
Wu Lin Feng 2014 - USA vs China	November 1, 2014	Riviera Hotel and Casino	Las Vegas, United States
Wu Lin Feng 2014 - Netherlands vs China	September 28, 2014	North Sea Venue	Zaandam, Netherlands
Wu Lin Feng 2014 - Queen's Cup 2014	August 12, 2014	Sanam Luang	Bangkok, Thailand
Wu Lin Feng 2014 - Ireland vs China	June 14, 2014	Citywest Hotel	Dublin, Ireland
Wu Lin Feng 2014 - China vs Thailand - Yokkao 9	May 24, 2014	Xinyang Stadium	Xinyang, Henan
Wu Lin Feng 2014 - Germany vs China - Day of Destruction 8	May 10, 2014	Sporthalle Wandsbek	Hamburg, Germany
Wu Lin Feng 2014 - New Zealand vs China	March 15, 2014	ASB Stadium	Auckland, New Zealand
Wu Lin Feng 2014 - Kunlun Fight 2 - MAX Muay Thai 6	February 16, 2014	Henan Provincial Stadium	Zhengzhou, Henan
Wu Lin Feng World Championship 2014 - Jan 18	January 18, 2014	Xiangyang Gymnasium	Xiangyang, Hubei
Wu Lin Feng 2013 - USA vs China	November 2, 2013	Riviera Hotel & Casino	Las Vegas, United States
Wu Lin Feng 2013 - New Zealand vs China	August 30, 2013	ASB Stadium	Auckland, New Zealand
Wu Lin Feng 2013 - China vs Thailand - MAX Muay Thai 3	August 10, 2013	Henan TV Studio 8	Zhengzhou, Henan
Wu Lin Feng 2013 - MMA Championship Dubai	Jun 6, 2013	Dubai World Trade Center	Dubai, United Arab Emirates
Wu Lin Feng World Championship 2012 - Dec 31	December 31, 2012	USTB Gymnasium	Beijing
Wu Lin Feng 2012 - USA vs China	November 11, 2012	Plaza Hotel & Casino	Las Vegas, United States
Wu Lin Feng 2012 - New Zealand vs China	July 21, 2012	ASB Stadium	Auckland, New Zealand
Wu Lin Feng 2012 - Germany vs China - Day of Destruction 5	April 28, 2012	Sporthalle Wandsbek	Hamburg, Germany
Wu Lin Feng 2011 - New Zealand vs China	November 12, 2011	ASB Stadium	Auckland, New Zealand
Wu Lin Feng 2011 - USA vs China	October 22, 2011	Las Vegas Hilton	Las Vegas, United States
Wu Lin Feng 2010 - USA vs China	November 13, 2010	Harrah's Ballroom	Las Vegas, United States
Wu Lin Feng 2009 - USA vs China	August 30, 2009	LV Hilton Hotel & Casino	Las Vegas, United States

== Championship history ==
=== Current champions ===
Upper weight limit	Champion	Since	Title defenses
77 kg (169.8 lb)	(China) Xu Yuanqing	February 7, 2026	0
70 kg (154.3 lb)	(China) Ouyang Feng	July 29, 2023	0
67 kg (147.7 lb)	(China) Er Kang	February 7, 2026	0
65 kg (143.3 lb)	(China) Meng Gaofeng	January 1, 2022	1
63 kg (138.9 lb)	(Georgia (country)) Giorgi Malania	January 25, 2025	2
60 kg (132.3 lb)	(Japan) Hirotaka Asahisa	March 10, 2018	2

=== Wu Lin Feng 60kg World Championship ===
Weight limit: 60 kg (132.3 lb)

Name	Date	Defenses
(Spain) Daniel Puertas Gallardo (def. Sergio Wielzen)	October 29, 2016	
Puertas Gallardo vacated the title in 2017 in order to move up in weight
(Spain) Javier Hernández (def. Hirotaka Asahisa)	May 6, 2017	
Hernández vacated the title in 2018
(Japan) Hirotaka Asahisa (def. Zhao Chongyang)	March 10, 2018	def. Wang Junyu on January 19, 2019; def. Yang Ming on May 2, 2023

=== Wu Lin Feng 63kg World Championship ===
Weight limit: 63 kg (138.9 lb)

Name	Date	Defenses
(Germany) Denis Wosik (def. Fang Feida)	January 2, 2019	def. Fang Feida on January 11, 2022
Wosik vacated the title in 2023
(Georgia (country)) Giorgi Malania (def. Hirotaka Asahisa)	January 25, 2025	def. Jin Ying on September 27, 2025; def. Zhu Shuai on February 7, 2026

=== Wu Lin Feng 65kg World Championship ===
Weight limit: 65 kg (143.3 lb)

No.	Name	Date	Defenses
1	(China) Wang Pengfei (def. Diego Freitas)	January 2, 2019	def. Liu Xiangming on November 30, 2019
2	(China) Meng Gaofeng (def. Wang Pengfei)	January 1, 2022	def. Serhiy Adamchuk on November 25, 2023

=== Wu Lin Feng 67kg World Championship ===
Weight limit: 67 kg (147.7 lb)

No.	Name	Date	Defenses
1	(China) Jia Aoqi (def. David Mejia)	January 27, 2024	
Jia Aoqi vacated the title in 2025
2	(China) Er Kang (def. Yi Yuxuan)	February 7, 2026	def. Mamedov Magsad on May 16, 2026

=== Wu Lin Feng 70kg World Championship ===
Weight limit: 70 kg (154.3 lb)

No.	Name	Date	Defenses
1	(Russia) Anatoly Moiseev (def. Giannis Boukis)	May 25, 2019	
2	(China) Ouyang Feng (def. Anatoly Moiseev)	July 29, 2023	def. Taras Hnatchuk on May 16, 2026

=== Wu Lin Feng 77kg World Championship ===
Weight limit: 77 kg (169.8 lb)

No.	Name	Date	Defenses
1	(China) Xu Yuanqing (def. Magomed Magomedov)	February 7, 2026	
2	(Russia) Dmitry Menshikov (def. Xu Yuanqing)	May 16, 2026	

== Tournament Champions ==
=== WLF World MAX Tournament Champions ===
Year	Weight	Champion	Runner-up	Location
2025	−70 kg (−154.3 lb)	Ouyang Feng	Han Wenbao	Tangshan
2025	−63 kg (−138.9 lb)	Giorgi Malania	Hirotaka Asahisa	Tangshan

=== WLF Kings Super Cup Champions ===
Year	Weight	Champion	Runner-up	Location
2020	−65 kg (−143.3 lb)	Wei Rui	Jin Ying	Zhengzhou

=== WLF World Cup Champions ===
Year	Weight	Champion	Runner-up	Location
2020	−67 kg (−147.7 lb)	Jia Aoqi	Petchtanong Banchamek	Zhuhai
2019	−67 kg (−147.7 lb)	Petchtanong Banchamek	Jomthong Chuwattana	Haikou

=== WLF World Championship Tournament Champions ===
Year	Weight	Champion	Runner-up	Location
2019	−70 kg (−154.3 lb)	Anatoly Moiseev	Giannis Boukis	Zhengzhou
2019	−63 kg (−138.9 lb)	Denis Wosik	Fang Feida	Zhuhai
2019	−65 kg (−143.3 lb)	Wang Pengfei	Diego Freitas	Zhuhai
2018	−60 kg (−132.3 lb)	Hirotaka Asahisa	Zhao Chongyang	Jiaozuo, Henan
2017	−63 kg (−138.9 lb)	Nafi Bilalovski	Wang Zhiwei	Xi'an, Shaanxi
2017	−60 kg (−132.3 lb)	Javier Hernandez	Hirotaka Asahisa	Zhengzhou, Henan
2016	−70 kg (−154.3 lb)	Shamil Gasanbekov	Enriko Kehl	Zhengzhou, Henan
2015	−63 kg (−138.9 lb)	Wei Rui	Deng Zeqi	Zhengzhou, Henan
2015	−67 kg (−147.7 lb)	Yang Zhuo	Qiu Jianliang	Zhengzhou, Henan

=== WLF World 8 Man Tournament Champions ===
Year	Weight	Champion	Runner-up	Since	Location
2017	-63 kg	Adrian Maxim	Zhao Fuxiang	January 14, 2017	Zhengzhou, Henan
2016	-67 kg	Qiu Jianliang	Andrei Kulebin	January 23, 2016	Shanghai
2015	-67 kg	Tie Yinghua	Khayal Dzhaniev	Jan 31, 2015	Chongqing
2014	-70 kg	Seyedisa Alamdarnezam	Dong Wenfei	Jan 18, 2014	Xiangyang, Hubei
2012	-70 kg	Albert Kraus	Dong Wenfei	Dec 31, 2012	Beijing
2010	-70 kg	Vuyisile Colossa	Dong Wenfei	Apr 18, 2010	Henan

=== Previous WLF World Champions ===
Weight	Champion	Since
−100 kg (−220.5 lb)	Andrey Gerasimchuk	June 29, 2014
−80 kg (−176.4 lb)	Simon Marcus	February 16, 2014
−73.5 kg (−162.0 lb)	Yi Long	January 18, 2014
−71 kg (−156.5 lb)	Sitthichai Sitsongpeenong	November 4, 2017
−70 kg (−154.3 lb)	Buakaw Banchamek	June 6, 2015
−67 kg (−147.7 lb)	Yang Zhuo	Aug 30, 2014
−60 kg (−132.3 lb)	Wang Kehan	June 8, 2014
−52 kg (−114.6 lb)	Jemyma Betrian	March 30, 2014

=== WLF International Champion ===
Weight	Champion	Since
−80 kg (−176.4 lb)	Fang Bian	Oct 4, 2014
−75 kg (−165.3 lb)	Dong Wenfei	Mar 7, 2015
−70 kg (−154.3 lb)	Raul Rodriguez	Nov 2, 2013
−65 kg (−143.3 lb)	Qiu Jianliang	April 27, 2014
−63 kg (−138.9 lb)	Wei Rui	Aug 30, 2014

== Tournament results ==
=== 2024-2025 WLF World MAX 70kg Tournament bracket ===
First Round (2024-8-31 / 9-28 / 10-26 / 11-30)
(China) Han Wenbao	UD
(Belarus) Dzianis Zuev	3
(Thailand) Jomthong Chuwattana	KO
(China) Meng Lingkuo	1
(Russia) Vasilii Semenov	UD
(China) Huang Yuan Zhe	3
(Romania) Marian Lăpușneanu	UD
(China) Chen Yonghui	3
(China) Ouyang Feng	UD
(Germany) Johannes Baas	3
(China) Ji Longteng	3
(Russia) Aleksei Ulianov	UD
(Iran) Masoud Minaei	UD
(Germany) Pascal Schroth	3
(China) Luo Chao	TKO
(Russia) Jamal Yusupov	3

Quarter Finals (2024-8-31 / 9-28 / 10-26 / 11-30)
(China) Han Wenbao	UD
(Thailand) Jomthong Chuwattana	3
(Romania) Marian Lăpușneanu	KO
(Russia) Vasilii Semenov	3
(China) Ouyang Feng	UD
(Russia) Aleksei Ulianov	3
(Iran) Masoud Minaei	1
(China) Luo Chao	TKO

Semi Finals (2025-1-25)
(China) Han Wenbao	SD
(Romania) Marian Lăpușneanu	3
(China) Ouyang Feng	UD
(China) Luo Chao	3

Final (2025-1-25)
(China) Han Wenbao	3
(China) Ouyang Feng	UD

=== 2024-2025 WLF World MAX −63 kg Tournament bracket ===
First Round (2024-9-28 / 10-26 / 11-30/ 12-28)
(China) Jin Ying	UD
(United Kingdom) Mo Abdurahman	3
(China) Zhao Chongyang	KO
(Spain) Daniel Puertas	2
(China) Zhang Lanpei	3
(Georgia (country)) Giorgi Malania	UD
(China) Wei Weiyang	UD
(Thailand) Kongnapa Weerasakreck	3
(Japan) Hirotaka Asahisa	UD
(China) Zhang Jingtao	3
(China) Zhu Shuai	UD
(Thailand) Pinpetch Banchamek	3
(China) Shun Li	UD
(Iran) Ali Zarinfar	3
(China) Ji Zhize	UD
(Thailand) Petchdam Petchyindee Academy	3

Quarter Finals (2024-9-28 / 10-26 / 11-30/ 12-28)
(China) Jin Ying	3
(China) Zhao Chongyang	UD
(Georgia (country)) Giorgi Malania	UD
(China) Wei Weiyang	3
(Japan) Hirotaka Asahisa	UD
(China) Zhu Shuai	3
(China) Shun Li	UD
(China) Ji Zhize	3

Semi Finals (2025-1-25)
(China) Zhao Chongyang	3
(Georgia (country)) Giorgi Malania	UD
(Japan) Hirotaka Asahisa	UD
(China) Ji Zhize^{1}	3

Final (2025-1-25)
(Japan) Hirotaka Asahisa	1
(Georgia (country)) Giorgi Malania	TKO

^{1}Shun Li couldn't participate to the tournament Final due to injury and was replaced by Ji Zhize.

=== 2016 WLF World Championship Tournament −70 kg bracket ===
First Round
Hu Yafei	R3
Farkhad Akhmejanau	DEC
Liu Wenlong	DEC
Robert Alan	R3
Zhao Yan	R3
Enriko Kehl	DEC
Ji Xiang	DEC
Gwan Woo Kim	R3
Nordin Ben moh	TKO
Kongnakun	R1
Wu Jianan	R2
Shamil Gasanbekov	TKO
Jiao Fukai	DEC
Arthur	R3
Xiong Ziqiang	TKO
Hicham Boubkari	R1

Quarter Finals
Farkhad Akhmejanau	DEC
Liu Wenlong	R3
Enriko Kehl	TKO
Ji Xiang	R2
Kongnakun (1)	R3
Shamil Gasanbekov	DEC
Jiao Fukai	DEC
Xiong Ziqiang	R3

Semi Finals (2017-01-14)
Farkhad Akhmejanau	R3
Enriko Kehl	DEC
Shamil Gasanbekov	DEC
Jiao Fukai	R3

Final (2017-01-14)
Enriko Kehl	R3
Shamil Gasanbekov	DEC

(1) Nordin injured exit.

=== 2016 WLF World 8 Man Tournament −67 kg bracket ===
Quarter Finals (2016-1-23)		Semi Finals		Final
Qiu Jianliang	DEC
Nathan Robson	R3	Qiu Jianliang	TKO
Lu Jianbo	TKO	Lu Jianbo	R1
Melsik Bagdasaryan	R3			Qiu Jianliang	KO
Xie Lei	DEC			Andrei Kulebin	R1
UMA	R3	Xie Lei	R3
Feng Jie	R4	Andrei Kulebin	DEC
Andrei Kulebin	DEC

=== 2015 WLF World Championship Tournament −63 kg bracket ===
First Round (2015-8-1 / 9-5 / 10-3 / 11-7)
Jin Ying	R3
Bohdan Kopkin	DEC
Wei Rui	DEC
Mahdi Mahmoudvand	R3
Wang Zhiwei	R3
Pakorn PKSaenchaimuaythaigym	DEC
Wang Fangkun	DEC
Pietro Doorje	R3
Gao Jun	R3
Rungravee Sasiprapa	DEC
Wei Ninghui	R3
Maksim Petkevich	DEC
Deng Zeqi	TKO
Maxim Railean	R3
Zhao Yongxiang	DEC
Ogawa Sho	R3

Quarter Finals (2015-8-1 / 9-5 / 10-3 / 11-7)
Bohdan Kopkin	R3
Wei Rui	DEC
Pakorn PKSaenchaimuaythaigym	DEC
Wang Fangkun	R3
Rungravee Sasiprapa	DEC
Maksim Petkevich	R3
Deng Zeqi	DEC
Zhao Yongxiang	R3

Semi Finals (2015-12-5)
Wei Rui	DEC
Pakorn PKSaenchaimuaythaigym	R3
Rungravee Sasiprapa	R1
Deng Zeqi	KO

Final (2015-12-5)
Wei Rui	TKO
Deng Zeqi	R4

=== 2015 WLF World Championship Tournament −67 kg bracket ===
First Round (2015-3-7 / 4-4 / 5-2 / 6-6)
Qiu Jianliang	DEC
Antonio Campagna	R3
Guo Dongwang	R3
Jomthong Chuwattana	DEC
Yang Zhuo	DEC
Komiya Yukihiro	R3
Wang Pengfei	DEC
Charlie Peters	R3
Xie Lei	DEC
Hussein Al Mansour	R3
Xu Jifu	DEC
Khayal Dzhaniev	R3
Ji Xiang	R3
Andrei Kulebin	DEC
Tie Yinghua	TKO
Nishikawa Kohei	R1

Quarter Finals (2015-3-7 / 4-4 / 5-2 / 6-6)
Qiu Jianliang	R3
Jomthong Chuwattana	DEC
Yang Zhuo	TKO
Wang Pengfei	R2
Xie Lei	R3
Xu Jifu	DEC
Andrei Kulebin	DEC
Tie Yinghua	R3

Semi Finals (2015-7-4)
Jomthong Chuwattana	R4
Yang Zhuo	DEC
Qiu Jianliang [1]	DEC
Andrei Kulebin	R3

Final (2015-7-4)
Yang Zhuo	DEC
Qiu Jianliang	R3

[1] Xu due to injury, Qiu substitute competition.

=== 2015 WLF World 8 Man Tournament −67 kg bracket ===
Quarter Finals (2015-1-31)		Semi Finals		Final
Tie Yinghua	DEC
Shane Oblonsky	R3	Tie Yinghua	KO
Zhang Dezheng	R3	Kim Dong Su	R1
Kim Dong Su	DEC			Tie Yinghua	DEC
Yang Zhuo	DEC			Khayal Dzhaniev	R3
Sandile Frans	R3	Yang Zhuo	R3
Ji Xiang	R3	Khayal Dzhaniev	DEC
Khayal Dzhaniev	DEC

=== 2014 WLF World 8 Man Tournament −70 kg bracket ===
Quarter Finals (2014-1-18)		Semi Finals		Final
Sun Weichao	DEC
K.MAX	R3	Sun Weichao	R3
Dong Wenfei	DEC	Dong Wenfei	DEC
Michael Krcmar	R3			Dong Wenfei	R3
Zhang Dezheng	DEC			Seyedisa Alamdarnezam	DEC
Dima Weimer	R3	Zhang Dezheng	R1
Albert Kraus	R3	Seyedisa Alamdarnezam	KO
Seyedisa Alamdarnezam	DEC

=== 2012 WLF World 8 Man Tournament −70 kg bracket ===
Quarter Finals (2012-12-31)		Semi Finals		Final
Zhou Zhipeng	DEC
Luis Bio	R3	Zhou Zhipeng	R3
Dong Wenfei	TKO	Dong Wenfei	DEC
Gustavo Mendes	R2			Dong Wenfei	R2
Wang Weihao	DEC			Albert Kraus	KO
Vuyisile Colossa	R3	Wang Weihao	R1
Zheng Zhaoyu	R3	Albert Kraus	TKO
Albert Kraus	TKO
