= Petchtanong Petchfergus =

Thai Muay Thai kickboxer (born 1985)

- Born: November 6, 1985 (age 41); Udon Thani, Thailand
- Other names: Petchtanong Banchamek; Petchtanong Sit-Or
- Height: 1.74 m (5 ft 8 1/2 in)
- Weight: 65.7 kg (145 lb; 10 st 5 lb)
- Division: Welterweight; Featherweight
- Reach: 68.5 in (174 cm)
- Style: Muay Thai
- Fighting out of: Bangkok, Thailand
- Team: Banchamek Gym; Sit-Or

Kickboxing record
- Total: 419
- Wins: 360
- Losses: 58
- Draws: 1

Petchtanong Petchfergus (Thai: เพชรทนง เพชรเฟอร์กัส; born November 6, 1985) is a Thai Muay Thai kickboxer fighting out of Bangkok. He is currently signed to ONE Championship, where he is a former ONE Bantamweight Kickboxing World Champion.

As of February 2021, he is the #7 ranked super featherweight according to Combat Press. He was ranked a top ten featherweight in the world by Combat Press between February 2019 and September 2020. He was dropped from the rankings in October 2020.

== Biography ==
Petchtanong started training in Muay Thai at 7 years old in a small camp close to his home. He quickly went to the live at the camp full time to escape an abusive familial situation.

At 12, he moved to Bangkok following his mom. There he joined the Sit.Or gym through his uncle which took him to a level high enough to headline shows at Rajadamnern and Lumpinee stadiums at the age of 14.

After changing gyms multiple times, Petchtanong was later sponsored by the Banchamek gym and went living, teaching and fighting in Australia for 2 years.

He came back to Thailand in 2015 and went on a winning streak in the Super Muay Thai promotion. He received calls to participate in various kickboxing world tournaments in China, prominently Kunlun Fight and Wu Lin Feng.

On January 19, 2019, he won the Wu Lin Feng World Cup final, defeating Jomthong Chuwattana.

Petchtanong participated in the 2020 Wu Lin Feng 67 tournament. He won the semifinal bout against Liu Yaning by KO, but lost a unanimous decision to Jia Aoqi in the finals.

=== ONE Championship ===
On August 18, 2020, Petchtanong signed with ONE Championship. In his debut at ONE Championship: A New Breed 3 on September 18, 2020, Petchtanong lost by knockout to Capitan Petchyindee Academy just 6 seconds into the first round, setting a new record for fastest knockout in ONE Super Series history.

Petchtanong made his sophomore appearance in the promotion against Zhang Chenglong at ONE Championship: Revolution on September 24, 2021. He won the bout via unanimous decision.

Petchtanong faced Hiroki Akimoto for the ONE Bantamweight Kickboxing World Championship at ONE 163 on November 19, 2022. He won the fight by split decision.

==== Doping suspension ====
On July 26, 2023, it was announced that Petchtanong was stripped of the title and suspended from ONE Championship for a year due to testing positive for both metenolone and boldenone, banned substance according to the World Anti-Doping Agency (WADA). The positive result came from an out of competition test performed on June 10, 2023.

After a one-year hiatus from being suspended, Petchtanong faced Alaverdi Ramazanov on June 28, 2024, at ONE Friday Fights 68. He won the fight via technical knockout in round two.

Petchtanong was scheduled to face Nabil Anane on December 7, 2024, at ONE Fight Night 26. However, the bout was cancelled when Petchtanong failed hydration and missed weight and was hospitalized and required IV drips.

Petchtanong was scheduled to face Ilias Ennahachi on February 20, 2025, at ONE 171.

== Championship and achievements ==
- ONE Championship
  - ONE Bantamweight Kickboxing World Championship (one time, former)
- Wu Lin Feng (WLF)
  - 2019 Wu Lin Feng World Cup -67 kg runner-up
  - 2018 Wu Lin Feng World Cup -67 kg Champion
- Enfusion
  - 2017 Enfusion -67 kg Tournament Champion
- International Professional Combat Council (IPCC)
  - 2015 IPCC World Muay Thai -67 kg Champion
- World Muaythai Council (WMC)
  - 2012 WMC World -66 kg Champion
- Beyond Kickboxing
  - 2022 Beyond Kick "Upset of the Year"

== Fight record ==
Muay Thai & kickboxing record
360 wins, 58 losses, 1 draw
Date	Result	Opponent	Event	Location	Method	Round	Time
2026-11-18	Loss	(Japan) Yutaro Asahi	ONE Samurai 5	Tokyo, Japan	Decision (unanimous)	3	3:00
2026-05-15	Win	(United Kingdom) Ben Woolliss	ONE Fight NIght 43	Bangkok, Thailand	Decision (unanimous)	3	3:00
2025-07-18	Loss	(Japan) Yuki Yoza	ONE Friday Fights 116, Lumpinee Stadium	Bangkok, Thailand	Decision (unanimous)	3	3:00
2024-06-28	Win	(Russia) Alaverdi Ramazanov	ONE Friday Fights 68, Lumpinee Stadium	Bangkok, Thailand	TKO (retirement)	2	1:59
2022-11-19	Win	(Japan) Hiroki Akimoto	ONE 163: Akimoto vs. Petchtanong	Kallang, Singapore	Decision (split)	5	3:00
Wins the ONE Bantamweight Kickboxing World Championship.
2021-09-24	Win	(China) Zhang Chenglong	ONE Championship: Revolution	Singapore	Decision (unanimous)	3	3:00
2020-09-18	Loss	(Thailand) Capitan Petchyindee Academy	ONE Championship: A New Breed 3	Bangkok, Thailand	KO (right cross)	1	0:06
2020-01-11	Loss	(China) Jia Aoqi	Wu Lin Feng 2020: WLF World Cup 2019-2020 Final, Final	Zhuhai, China	Decision (unanimous)	3	3:00
For the 2019 Wu Lin Feng World Cup -67kg title.
2020-01-11	Win	(China) Liu Yaning	Wu Lin Feng 2020: WLF World Cup 2019-2020 Final, Semi Final	Zhuhai, China	TKO	1	0:50
2019-10-26	Win	(Japan) Yuya Yamato	Wu Lin Feng 2019: WLF -67kg World Cup 2019-2020 5th Group Stage	Zhengzhou, China	Decision (unanimous)	3	3:00
2019-08-31	Win	(China) Liu Jianbo	Wu Lin Feng 2019: WLF -67kg World Cup 2019-2020 3rd Group Stage	Zhengzhou, China	TKO (left straight)	1	2:00
2019-06-29	Win	(China) Xie Lei	Wu Lin Feng 2019: WLF -67kg World Cup 2019-2020 1st Group Stage	Zhengzhou, China	Decision	3	3:00
2019-01-19	Win	(Thailand) Jomthong Chuwattana	Wu Lin Feng 2019: WLF World Cup 2018-2019 Final, Final	Haikou, China	Decision (unanimous)	3	3:00
Wins the 2019 Wu Lin Feng World Cup -67kg title.
2019-01-19	Win	(China) Yang Zhuo	Wu Lin Feng 2019: WLF World Cup 2018-2019 Final, Semi Finals	Haikou, China	Decision (unanimous)	3	3:00
2018-11-03	Win	(China) Xie Lei	Wu Lin Feng 2018: WLF -67kg World Cup 2018-2019 5th Round	China	Decision (unanimous)	3	3:00
2018-09-01	Win	(China) Lu Jun	Wu Lin Feng 2018: WLF -67kg World Cup 2018-2019 3rd Round	Zhengzhou, China	Decision (unanimous)	3	3:00
2018-07-07	Win	(China) Zhang Junyu	Wu Lin Feng 2018: WLF -67kg World Cup 2018-2019 1st Round	Zhengzhou, China	Decision (unanimous)	3	3:00
2018-05-21	Win	(Denmark) Niclas Larsen	All Star Fight 4	Hong Kong	Decision (unanimous)	3	3:00
2018-04-28	Win	(Ukraine) Sergey Kulyaba	All Star Fight 3	Bangkok, Thailand	Decision (unanimous)	3	3:00
2017-12-08	Win	(Morocco) Youssef El Haji	Enfusion #59, -67 kg Tournament, Final	Abu Dhabi	Decision (unanimous)	3	3:00
Wins the Enfusion -67kg Tournament.
2017-12-08	Win	(Morocco) Walid Hamid	Enfusion #59, -67 kg Tournament, Semi Finals	Abu Dhabi	Decision (unanimous)	3	3:00
2017-11-12	Loss	(Morocco) Ilias Bulaid	Kunlun Fight 67 - 66kg World Championship, Quarter Finals	Sanya, China	Decision (unanimous)	3	3:00
2017-10-07	Draw	(Democratic Republic of the Congo) Nayanesh Ayman	MBK Fight Night	Bangkok, Thailand	Decision	3	3:00
2017-08-27	Win	(Japan) Yuya Yamato	Kunlun Fight 65, -66kg World Championship, 1/8 Finals	China	Decision (unanimous)	3	3:00
2017-07-28	Loss	(Thailand) Jo Nattawut	Lion Fight 37	Ledyard, United States	Decision (unanimous)	5	3:00
For the Lion Fight Super Welterweight title.
2017-04-01	Win	(Thailand) Manaowan Sitsongpeenong	Super Muaythai	Bangkok, Thailand	Decision	3	3:00
2017-02-07	Win	(Denmark) Mohammed El-Mir	Super Muaythai	Bangkok, Thailand	Decision	3	3:00
2016-12-09	Win	(China) Liu		China	TKO	1	1:37
2016-09-10	Win	(Netherlands) Buray Bozaryilmaz	Kunlun Fight 51, - 66kg World Championship, 1/8 Finals	China	TKO (technical decision)	3	
2016-08-07	Win	(Japan) Tetsuya Yamato	Kunlun Fight 49 / Rebels 45, - 66kg World Championship, First Round	China	Decision (unanimous)	3	3:00
2016-05-29	Win	(Scotland) Craig Suthai	SUPER MUAYTHAI	Bangkok, Thailand	Decision (unanimous)	3	3:00
2016-03-20	Win	(Italy) Chris 7MuayThai	SUPER MUAYTHAI	Bangkok, Thailand	Decision (unanimous)	3	3:00
2016-03-20	Win	(Belgium) Hamza Bekkouri	SUPER MUAYTHAI	Bangkok, Thailand	TKO (low kick)	2	
2015-12-12	Win	(Ukraine) Igor Liubchenko	SUPER MUAYTHAI	Bangkok, Thailand	Decision (unanimous)	3	3:00
Wins the IPCC Muay Thai World -67kg title.
2015-11-29	Loss	(China) Xu Jifu	Wuzhan Global Fighting King Championship	Foshan, China	Decision (split)	5	3:00
2015-11-07	Win	(Spain) Aitor Alonso	SUPER MUAYTHAI	Bangkok, Thailand	Decision (unanimous)	3	3:00
2015-09-28	Win	(China) Gu Hui	Kunlun Fight 31	China	Decision (unanimous)	3	3:00
2014-10-11	Win	(Australia) Clayton Cook	Legal Assault VIII	Australia	Decision (unanimous)	5	3:00
2014-08-03	Win	(Australia) Beniah Douma		Australia	Decision (unanimous)	5	3:00
2014-05-02	Win	(Australia) Kurt Finlayson	Cage Soldiers 1	Australia	Decision (unanimous)	5	3:00
2014-02-22	Win	(France)	Pride and Glory	Australia	Decision (unanimous)	5	3:00
2013-10-26	Win	(Australia) Rhyse Saliba	Real Hero Muay Thai Championship	Sydney, Australia	Decision (unanimous)	3	3:00
2013-10-12	Win	(Australia) Jacob Moulden	Pride and Glory 6	Australia	Decision	5	3:00
2013-08-10	Loss	(China) Tie Yinghua	MAX Muay Thai 3	Zhengzhou, China	Decision	3	03:00
2013	Win	(Australia) Beniah Douma		Australia	KO	1	
2013-04-13	Win	(Australia)	Fight for Glory	Australia			
2013-03-23	Win	(Russia) Magomed Amarof	World Professional Muaythai Championship Marathon 2013	Bangkok, Thailand	TKO	4	
2013-03-02	Loss	(Australia) Toby Smith	Domination 10	Australia	Decision	5	3:00
2012-10-23	Win	(Italy) Angelo Veniero	Thai Fight	Thailand	Decision	3	3:00
2012-09-21	Win	(Iran) Yaser Samadi	KO16	Dubai	Decision	5	3:00
2012-08-14	Win	(Thailand) Trongchai Kietprapat	X-ONE FIGHT NIGHT	Thailand	Decision	5	3:00
2012-04-13	Win	(Australia) Matthew King	Pride and Glory	Australia	Decision	5	3:00
2012-03-31	Win	(United Kingdom) Michael Dicks	Muay Thai Grand Prix	England	Decision	5	3:00
Wins WMC World -66kg title.
2012-02-04	Win	(Thailand) Chok Eminent air	Boxing Channel 11	Thailand	Decision	5	3:00
2012	Win	(Thailand) Khong-fha	Tata Motors sponsored TV Event	Thailand	Decision	5	3:00
2011-09-09	Win	(France)		Réunion	Decision		
2010-12-06	Loss	(Thailand) F-16 Rachanon	Lumpinee Stadium	Bangkok, Thailand	Decision	5	3:00
2010-11-03	Loss	(Thailand) F-16 Rachanon	Lumpinee Stadium	Bangkok, Thailand	Decision	5	3:00
2010-09-25	Win	(Thailand) Phetasawin Seatranferry	Omnoi Stadium	Bangkok, Thailand	KO (high kick)	5	
2009-11-24	Loss	(Thailand) Superbon Banchamek	Wanwerapon Fights, Lumpinee Stadium	Bangkok, Thailand	Decision	5	3:00
2009-09-26	Loss	(Thailand) Orono Wor Petchpun	Muaythai Lumpinee Krikkrai Fight	Bangkok, Thailand	Decision	5	3:00
2009-08-08	Win	(Thailand) Tuantong Phumpanmoung	Lumpinee Stadium, Rangyeh tournament	Bangkok, Thailand	Decision	5	3:00
2009-06-13	Loss	(Thailand) Singdam Kiatmuu9	Lumpinee Stadium	Bangkok, Thailand	Decision	5	3:00
2009-05-22	Win	(Thailand) Pansak Luk Bor.Kor	Lumpinee Stadium	Bangkok, Thailand	Decision	5	3:00
2009-04-04	Win	(Thailand) Puengnoi Petsupapon	Lumpinee Stadium	Bangkok, Thailand	Decision	5	3:00
2009-01-05	Win	(Thailand) Dechasak Sor.Thamapetch	Rajadamnern Stadium	Bangkok, Thailand	Decision	5	3:00
2008-12-15	Win	(Thailand) Dechasak Sor.Thamapetch	Rajadamnern Stadium	Bangkok, Thailand	Decision	5	3:00
2008-08-03	Win	(Japan) Shiro Utsunomiya	Kick vs Muay Thai ～TARGET 1st～	Japan	TKO (doctor stoppage)	3	2:15
2007-05-13	Loss	(Thailand) Yutajak Kaewsamrit	Channel 7 Stadium	Bangkok, Thailand	KO	4	
2007-03-11	Win	(Thailand) Chok Eminent air	Channel 7 Stadium	Thailand	Decision	5	3:00
2007-02-10	Win	(Thailand) Somingphai Kitaponthip	Omnoi Stadium	Thailand	Decision	5	3:00
2005-04-18	Win	(Thailand) Narongrit Sitpayong	Rajadamnern Stadium	Bangkok, Thailand	Decision	5	3:00
Legend: Win Loss Draw/no contest Notes
