= Qiu Jianliang =

Chinese kickboxer

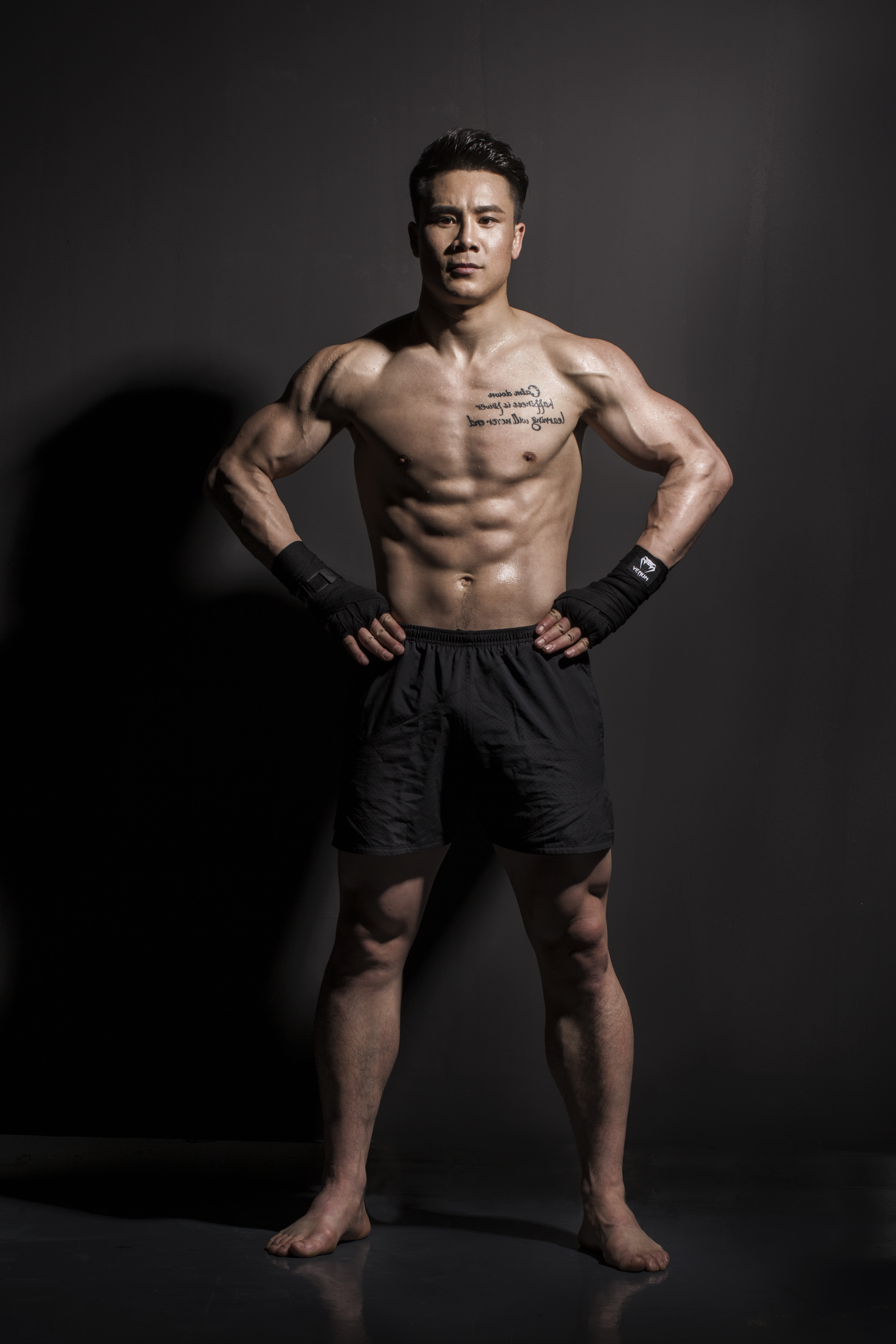
- Qiu Jianliang, 2018
- Born: February 20, 1990 (age 36); Fengyang County, Chuzhou, Anhui, China
- Native name: 邱建良
- Other names: Tank
- Nationality: (China) Chinese
- Height: 1.72 m (5 ft 7 1/2 in)
- Weight: 65.0 kg (143.3 lb; 10.24 st)
- Division: Featherweight; Lightweight
- Style: Kickboxing, Sanda, Muay Thai
- Stance: Orthodox
- Fighting out of: Zhengzhou, China
- Team: Da Dong Xiang Fight Club
- Years active: 2011–present

Professional boxing record
- Total: 1
- Wins: 1
- By knockout: 1
- Losses: 0

Kickboxing record
- Total: 59
- Wins: 51
- By knockout: 23
- Losses: 8

Mixed martial arts record
- Total: 1
- Wins: 0
- By submission: 0
- Losses: 1
- By submission: 1

Amateur record
- Total: 12
- Wins: 10
- By knockout: 4
- Losses: 2

Other information
- Website: https://www.facebook.com/profile.php?id=100006530190759
- Last updated on: October 20, 2018

Qiu Jianliang (Chinese: 邱建良; pinyin: Qiū Jiàn Liáng) is a Chinese kickboxer. He joined the Chinese National Muay Thai Team in September 2012. In October 2013 he joined the Da Dong Xiang fight club to compete in professional kickboxing.

As of December 2021, he is ranked as the fifth best super featherweight in the world by Combat Press, and was ranked as high as #1 in February 2021.

== Career ==
=== Early career ===
Jianliang made his professional debut against Wisrichai at the 2013 China vs Thailand Muay Thai tournament. He beat Wisrichai by a second-round knockout. Twelve months later, he beat Songchai by knockout as well. He suffered his first professional loss against Phosa Nopphorn on January 18, 2014.

On May 24, 2014 in Xinyang Stadium at Yokkao 9 Qiu Jianliang beat Imwiset Pornnarai.

On November 1, 2014, Jianliang fought Melsik Baghdasaryan at Wu Lin Feng & WCK Muaythai: China vs USA for the Wu Lin Feng International 67 kg title. Baghdasaryan won the fight by majority decision.

Jianliang came in overweight for a fight against Hiroki Kangeki scheduled on April 12, 2015. He was cancelled and Jainliang given an automatic loss.

On July 4, 2015, Jianliang took part in the 2015 WLF 67 kg tournament. After winning a unanimous decision against Andrei Kulebin in the semifinals, he lost a unanimous decision in turn to Yang Zhuo. He rebounded from this loss with a decision win against Andrei Khamionak.

=== The 14-fight winning streak ===
His victory over Khamionak was the first win of a six fight winning streak, during which he further beat Kane Conlan and Shavone Warren by decision, as well as Alessio Dangelo, Bovy Sor Udomson and Mosab Amrani by stoppage. This fight culminated in a fight with Honghoen Por.niramon for the S1 Muaythai Welterweight title. Jianliang won the fight by a third-round knockout.

Jianliang participated in the 2016 Wu Lin Feng World Championship, held in Shanghai. He beat Nathan Robson and Lu Jianbo in the quarterfinals and semifinals respectively. He fought a rematch with Andrei Kulebin in the finals, and won by a first-round knockout.

On April 2, 2016 in China at the inaugural Glory of Heroes event Qiu Jianliang beat Jomthong Chuwattana. On May 7, 2016 in Shenzhen, China at Baoan Stadium on Glory of Heroes 2, Qiu Jianliang beat Noppakrit Kor.Kampanart. After beating Ruslan Kushnirenko at Glory of Heroes 3, he Jianliang was scheduled to fight Azize Hlali at Wu Lin Feng 2016: China vs Morocco. Hlali won the fight by decision, snapping Jianliang's 14-fight winning streak.

=== Glory of Heroes title run ===
September 17, 2016 in Chaoyang, China on a new event series dubbed "Rise of Heroes" Qiu Jianliang defeated Melvin Wassing. On Saturday, October 1, 2016 Glory of Heroes 5 in Zhengzhou, Qiu Jianliang beat Ilias Bulaid by decision. At Rise of Heroes 4, Jianliang fought Sebastien Fleury for the Martigny M.J.M Champion 67 kg title. He won the fight by a first-round head kick knockout.

After this title win, Jianliang beat Adrian Maxim at Glory of Heroes 5 by unanimous decision. On January 13, 2017 Qiu Jianliang was in action at Glory of Heroes 6, where he earned a violent, spinning back kick finish of Kem Sitsongpeenong, to climb into the second place in Combat Press' rankings. On March 4, 2017 Glory of Heroes debuted in Brazil for Glory of Heroes 7. In the night's action, Qiu Jianliang kept his winning streak alive against Wilson Djavan, winning by decision. He further beat Diego Freitas and Subsakorn, he appeared on the Krush and Glory of Heroes collaborated card - Krush.77‘Japan vs. China in Korakuen Hall Tokyo, Japan. Qiu Jianliang beat the former R.I.S.E. champion Komiya Yukihiro by unanimous decision.

This nine-fight winning streak earned him a place in the 2017 Glory of Heroes 65 kg tournament. In the tournament semifinals, Jianliang beat Aleksei Ulianov by unanimous decision. He beat Dylan Salvador in the same manner in the tournament finals.

=== Glory of Heroes title reign ===
On January 27, 2018 Glory of Heroes traveled to the Huandong Gymnasium in Qingdao, China, for Glory of Heroes 9. Jianliang defeated Yuichiro Nagashima by TKO in Round 3. On Saturday, May 26, 2018 Glory of Heroes held its 31st event in Beijing, China. Qiu Jianliang beat Kaew Weerasakreck by decision. At Glory of Heroes 33, Jianliang fought Issam Chadid. He extended his winning streak to 14, beating Chadid by unanimous decision.

At Glory of Heroes 38, Jianliang fought Dmitry Varats for the 2019 ISKA Junior Lightweight title. He won the fight by TKO, after Varats withdrew from the bout at the end of the second round.

After winning the ISKA Junior Welterweight title, Jianliang was scheduled to fight Ivan Avdeev at Glory of Heroes 41. He won the fight by unanimous decision. Jianliang was next scheduled to fight Ivan Naccari at Glory of Heroes 44, whom he beat by decision. Jianliang injured the ligaments of his right knee in the first round of the Naccari fight, which sidelined him for the entirety of 2020.

=== ONE Championship ===
It was announced on June 20, 2021, that Jianliang had signed with the ONE Championship, and would compete in the bantamweight kickboxing division of the promotion.

Jianliang made his ONE debut against Hiroki Akimoto at ONE: Winter Warriors on December 3, 2021. He lost the bout via unanimous decision.

== Championships and awards ==
- Kickboxing
  - 2019 ISKA Welterweight (-67 kg) Intercontinental Champion
  - 2017 GOH Featherweight (-65kg) World Champion
  - 2016 WLF World 8 Man Tournament champion -67 kg
  - 2015 WLF World Championship Runner Up -67 kg
  - 2014 WLF Men's intercontinental champion -65 kg
- Muaythai
  - 2015 S-1 Muaythai Welterweight World champion (1 title def.)
  - 2014 S-1 Muaythai Welterweight World champion
- Amateur Muay Thai
  - 2013 Chinese Muay Thai Championship (gold) -75 kg
  - 2012 Chinese Muay Thai Championship (bronze) -71 kg
  - 2011 Chinese Muay Thai Championship (silver) -71 kg
- Ranking
  - N°1 Combat Press.com at Featherweight, October, 2018
  - N°8 Combat Press.com at Pound-For-Pound, October, 2018
  - N°4 Liver Kick.com at Featherweight, March 12, 2018

== Kickboxing record ==
Kickboxing record
51 Wins (23 (T)KOs), 8 losses
Date	Result	Opponent	Event	Location	Method	Round	Time
2021-12-03	Loss	(Japan) Hiroki Akimoto	ONE: Winter Warriors	Kallang, Singapore	Decision (unanimous)	3	3:00
2019-12-28	Win	(Italy) Ivan Naccari	Glory of Heroes 44	China	Decision	3	3:00
2019-09-29	Win	(Russia) Ivan Avdeev	Glory of Heroes 41	Qinhuangdao, China	Decision	3	3:00
2019-08-05	Win	(Egypt) Ahmed Ismael	Glory of Heroes 40	Egypt	Ext.R decision (unanimous)	4	3:00
2019-05-25	Win	(Belarus) Dmitry Varats	Glory of Heroes 38: Shantou	Shantou, China	TKO (retirement)	2	3:00
Wins the 2019 ISKA Welterweight (-67 kg) Intercontinental title.
2018-07-28	Win	(Spain) Issam Chadid	Glory of Heroes 33: Shanghai	Shanghai, China	Decision (unanimous)	3	3:00
2018-05-26	Win	(Thailand) Kaew Weerasakreck	Glory of Heroes 31: Beijing	Beijing, China	Decision (unanimous)	3	3:00
2018-01-27	Win	(Japan) Yuichiro Nagashima	Glory of Heroes: Qingdao	Qingdao, China	TKO (punches)	3	1:23
2017-12-23	Win	(France) Dylan Salvador	Glory of Heroes: Jinan - GOH 65 kg Championship Tournament, Finals	Jinan, China	Decision (unanimous)	3	3:00
Wins the 2017 GOH Featherweight (-65kg) World title.
2017-12-23	Win	(Russia) Aleksei Ulianov	Glory of Heroes: Jinan - GOH 65 kg Championship Tournament, Semi-Finals	Jinan, China	Decision (unanimous)	3	3:00
2017-07-16	Win	(Japan) Komiya Yukihiro	Glory of Heroes: Japan & Krush.77	Tokyo, Japan	Decision (unanimous)	3	3:00
2017-06-16	Win	(Thailand) Subsakorn	Glory of Heroes: Shangyu	Shangyu, China	KO (spinning heel kick)	2	
2017-05-27	Win	(Portugal) Diego Freitas	Glory of Heroes: Portugal & Strikers League	Carcavelos, Portugal	Ext. R decision	4	3:00
2017-03-04	Win	(Brazil) Wilson Djavan	Glory of Heroes 7	Sao Paulo, Brazil	Decision (unanimous)	3	3:00
2017-01-13	Win	(Thailand) Kem Sitsongpeenong	Glory of Heroes 6	Jiyuan, China	KO (spinning back kick to the body)	1	2:19
2016-12-17	Win	(Romania) Adrian Maxim	Glory of Heroes - Rise 5	Nanning, China	Decision (unanimous)	3	3:00
2016-11-19	Win	(Switzerland) Sebastien Fleury	Rise of Heroes 4: Europe VS China	Martigny, Switzerland	KO (right high kick)	1	2:26
Wins the Martigny M.J.M -67 kg title.
2016-10-01	Win	(Morocco) Ilias Bulaid	Glory of Heroes 5	Zhengzhou, China	Decision (unanimous)	3	3:00
2016-09-17	Win	(Netherlands) Melvin Wassing	Rise of Heroes 1	Chaoyang, Liaoning, China	Decision (unanimous)	3	3:00
2016-08-04	Loss	(France) Azize Hlali	Wu Lin Feng 2016: WFL x Fight League - China vs Morocco	Tangier, Morocco	Decision	3	3:00
For the Fight League World -67 kg title.
2016-07-02	Win	(Ukraine) Ruslan Kushnirenko	Glory of Heroes 3	Jiyuan, China	TKO (corner stoppage)	2	2:21
2016-05-07	Win	(Thailand) Noppakrit Kor.Kampanart	Glory of Heroes 2	Shenzhen, China	Decision (unanimous)	3	3:00
2016-04-02	Win	(Thailand) Jomthong Chuwattana	Glory of Heroes 1	Shenzhen, China	Ext. R decision (unanimous)	4	3:00
2016-01-23	Win	(Belarus) Andrei Kulebin	Wu Lin Feng 2016: World Championship in Shanghai 8 Man Tournament, Final	Shanghai, China	KO (right hook)	1	1:51
Wins the Wu Lin Feng World 8 Man -67kg Tournament.
2016-01-23	Win	(China) Lu Jianbo	Wu Lin Feng 2016: World Championship in Shanghai 8 Man Tournament, Semi Finals	Shanghai, China	TKO (punches)	1	2:16
2016-01-23	Win	(Australia) Nathan Robson	Wu Lin Feng 2016: World Championship in Shanghai 8 Man Tournament, Quarter Finals	Shanghai, China	Decision (unanimous)	3	3:00
2015-12-12	Win	(Thailand) Montree Khongthongkam	Wu Lin Feng 2015	Beijing, China	KO (right hook)	2	2:48
2015-12-05	Win	(Thailand) Honghoen Por.niramon	Wu Lin Feng King's Cup 2015 Celebrating the King's Birthday	Bangkok, Thailand	KO	3	
Retains the S1 Muaythai Welterweight World title.
2015-11-13	Win	(United States) Shavone Warren	Wu Lin Feng & WCK Muaythai: China vs USA	Las Vegas, USA	Decision (unanimous)	3	3:00
2015-11-07	Win	(Morocco) Mosab Amrani	Wu Lin Feng 2015	Shenyang, China	TKO (doctor stoppage)	2	0:00
2015-10-24	Win	(Thailand) Bovy Sor Udomson	Wu Lin Feng 2015	Hong Kong, China	KO (left head knee)	1	2:59
2015-10-03	Win	(Italy) Alessio Dangelo	Wu Lin Feng 2015	Zhengzhou, China	TKO (low kick)	1	
2015-09-19	Win	(New Zealand) Kane Conlan	Wu Lin Feng 2015	Oakland, New Zealand	Decision (unanimous)	3	3:00
2015-08-08	Win	(Belarus) Andrei Khamionak	Wu Lin Feng 2015	Xi'an, China	Decision (unanimous)	3	3:00
2015-07-04	Loss	(China) Yang Zhuo	Wu Lin Feng World Championship 2015 – 67 kg Tournament, Final	Zhengzhou, China	Decision (unanimous)	3	3:00
For the Wu Lin Feng 2015 World Championship -67 kg title.
2015-07-04	Win	(Belarus) Andrei Kulebin	Wu Lin Feng World Championship 2015 – 67 kg Tournament, Semi Final	Zhengzhou, China	Decision (unanimous)	3	3:00
2015-06-21	Win	(South Korea) Kim Dongsu	Wu Lin Feng 2015	Chengdu, China	Ext. R decision (unanimous)	4	3:00
2015-06-06	Win	(Germany) Kim Robin Leinz	Wu Lin Feng World Championship 2015 – 67 kg Tournament, Reserve Fight	Zhengzhou, China	KO (spinning heel kick)	3	1:13
2015-03-07	Loss	(Thailand) Jomthong Chuwattana	Wu Lin Feng World Championship 2015 – 67 kg Tournament, Quarter Finals	Zhengzhou, China	Decision	3	3:00
2015-03-07	Win	(Italy) Antonio Campagna	Wu Lin Feng World Championship 2015 – 67 kg Tournament, Open	Zhengzhou, China	Decision (unanimous)	3	3:00
2015-01-31	Win	(Thailand) Bovy Sor Udomson	Wu Lin Feng 2014 World Kickboxing Championship	Chongqing, China	Decision (unanimous)	3	3:00
2014-12-31	Win	(Russia) Oumoke	Wu Lin Feng 2014	Yi'ning, China	Decision (unanimous)	3	3:00
2014-11-01	Loss	(Armenia) Melsik Baghdasaryan	Wu Lin Feng & WCK Muaythai: China vs USA	Las Vegas, USA	Decision (majority)	3	3:00
For the Wu Lin Feng International -67 kg title.
2014-10-04	Win	(Uzbekistan) Manshbeko Tolipov	Wu Lin Feng 2014	Wenling, China	KO (punches)	2	1:35
2014-09-21	Win	(Japan) Atsushi Ogata	Peng Cheng Jue: China vs Japan	Shenzhen, China	KO	2	
2014-09-07	Win	(Brazil) Rafael Silvalet	Wu Lin Feng 2014	Karamay, China	TKO (corner stoppage)	2	1:10
2014-08-12	Win	(Thailand) Superball Sor Borisu	Wu Lin Feng & Thailand Queen's Cup 2014	Bangkok, Thailand	TKO (referee stoppage)	3	2:40
Wins the S1 Muaythai Welterweight World title.
2014-07-18	Win	(Thailand) Phosa Nopphorn	Wu Lin Feng 2014	Dingyuan, China	TKO (low kick)	2	1:50
2014-06-14	Loss	(Republic of Ireland) Frans Mlambo	Wu Lin Feng 2014	Dublin, Ireland	Decision (unanimous)	3	3:00
2014-05-24	Win	(Thailand) Imwiset Pornnarai	Wu Lin Feng & Yokkao 9	Xinyang, China	Decision (unanimous)	3	3:00
2014-04-27	Win	(China) Wang Pengfei	Wu Lin Feng World Championship 2014 – 67 kg Tournament, Final	Luohe, China	Decision (unanimous)	3	3:00
Wins the Wu Lin Feng International -65 kg title.
2014-04-27	Win	(Malaysia) Ediey Selendang Kuning	Wu Lin Feng World Championship 2014 – 67 kg Tournament, Semi Finals	Luohe, China	KO (left hook to the body)	1	1:20
2014-04-14	Win	(Iran) Behzad Rafigh Doust	Combat Banchamek	Surin, Thailand	Decision	3	3:00
2014-03-07	Win	(United Kingdom) James	Wu Lin Feng 2014	Hangzhou, China	KO (right spinning back kick to the body)	1	2:11
2014-02-16	Win	(Thailand) Sagetdao Petpayathai	Wu Lin Feng & Kunlun Fight 2 & MAX Muay Thai 6	Zhengzhou, China	TKO (referee stoppage)	3	2:57
2014-01-18	Loss	(Thailand) Phosa Nopphorn	Wu Lin Feng 2013 World Kickboxing Championship	Zhengzhou, China	Decision (unanimous)	3	3:00
2013-12-27	Win	(Thailand) Songchai	Wu Lin Feng 2013	Changji, China	KO		
2013-01-26	Win	(Thailand) Wisrichai	2013 China vs Thailand Muay Thai tournament	Zhengzhou, China	KO (elbow)	2	
Legend: Win Loss Draw/no contest Notes

== Mixed martial arts record ==
Professional record breakdown
1 match	0 wins	1 loss
By submission	0	1
By decision	0	0

Res.	Record	Opponent	Method	Event	Date	Round	Time	Location	Notes
Loss	0–1	Kenneth Evensen	Submission (heel hook)	Glory of Heroes 36: Ziyang	October 20, 2018	1	3:45	Sichuan, China	

== Professional boxing record ==
1 fight	1 win	0 losses
By knockout	1	0
By decision	0	0

No.	Result	Record	Opponent	Type	Round, time	Date	Location	Notes
1	Win	1–0	(Thailand) Narong Bunchan	TKO	3 (4), 1:05	2018-09-15	Tongling Sports Center, Tongling, Anhui, China	

== Amateur Muay Thai record ==
Amateur Muay Thai record
10 wins(4 (T)KOs), 2 losses
Date	Result	Opponent	Event	Location	Method	Round	Time
2013-04-28	Win	(China) Luo Can	National Muaythai Competition 2013 & World Kungfu GF League Tryout, Final -75 kg	Wenchang, China	TKO (referee stoppage)	1	
Wins the Chinese Muay Thai Championship Gold Medal -75 kg.
2013-04-28	Win	(China) Geng Haojun	National Muaythai Competition 2013 & World Kungfu GF League Tryout, Semi Finals -75 kg	Wenchang, China	Decision (unanimous)	3	2:00
2013-04-27	Win	(China) Lu Xiangwei	National Muaythai Competition 2013 & World Kungfu GF League Tryout, Quarter Finals -75 kg	Wenchang, China	Decision (unanimous)	3	2:00
2013-04-26	Win	(China) Huang Zhenyou	National Muaythai Competition 2013 & World Kungfu GF League Tryout, Eighth Finals -75 kg	Wenchang, China	Decision (unanimous)	3	2:00
2012-06-23	Win	(China) Li Mu	National Muaythai Competition 2012 & World Kungfu GF League Tryout, Semi Finals -71 kg	Jingmen, China	KO	1	
Wins the Chinese Muay Thai Championship Bronze Medal -71 kg.
2012-06-22	Loss	(China) Zhao Feilong	National Muaythai Competition 2012 & World Kungfu GF League Tryout, Semi Finals -71 kg	Jingmen, China	Decision (unanimous)	4	2:00
2012-06-22	Win	(China) Xie Lei	National Muaythai Competition 2012 & World Kungfu GF League Tryout, Quarter Finals -71 kg	Jingmen, China	Decision (unanimous)	4	2:00
2012-06-21	Win	(China) Wu Xuesong	National Muaythai Competition 2012 & World Kungfu GF League Tryout, Eighth Finals -71 kg	Jingmen, China	Decision (unanimous)	4	2:00
2011-07-30	Loss	(China) Zhang Lei	National Muaythai Competition 2011 & World Kungfu GF League Tryout, Final -71 kg	Foshan, China	TKO (corner stoppage)	1	
Wins the Chinese Muay Thai Championship Silver Medal -71 kg.
2011-07-30	Win	(China) Aihemaitijiang Duolikun	National Muaythai Competition 2011 & World Kungfu GF League Tryout, Semi Finals -71 kg	Foshan, China	Decision (unanimous)	4	2:00
2011-07-29	Win	(China) Lv Yalun	National Muaythai Competition 2011 & World Kungfu GF League Tryout, Quarter Finals -71 kg	Foshan, China	TKO (referee stoppage)	3	
2011-07-28	Win	(China) Xiao Kaifei	National Muaythai Competition 2011 & World Kungfu GF League Tryout, Eighth Finals -71 kg	Foshan, China	TKO (referee stoppage)	3	
Legend: Win Loss Draw/no contest Notes
