= Dong Wenfei =

Chinese sanshou fighter and kickboxer

- Born: February 15, 1990 (age 36); Xiangcheng, Henan, China
- Native name: 董文飞
- Other names: Dragon in the Cloud
- Nationality: Chinese
- Height: 1.77 m (5 ft 9 1/2 in)
- Weight: 71 kg (157 lb; 11.2 st)
- Division: Lightweight; Middleweight
- Style: Sanda; Kickboxing
- Stance: Orthodox
- Fighting out of: China
- Team: Xiangcheng Haoshuang Fight Club
- Years active: 2008–2016; 2018-present

Kickboxing record
- Total: 72
- Wins: 55
- By knockout: 20
- Losses: 17
- By knockout: 3

Other information
- Website: https://weibo.com/u/1926159814
- Last updated on: January 29, 2019

Dong Wenfei (Chinese: 董文飞; pinyin: Dǒng Wénfēi) is a Chinese Sanda fighter and kickboxer who competes in the Featherweight and Lightweight divisions. Dong is a multiple provincial and national Sanshou titlist in China; he acquired an amateur Sanshou record of 37-13. Dong later switched to kickboxing.

In 2009, Dong won the Guangdong International Wushu champion. He fought in the Rally Competition in the Lightweight competition between China and Thailand in 2009. In February 2012, he was selected for the Chinese Wushu Team and joined Da Dong Xiang Fight Club in 2013.

In 2011 Dong was the champion in the 70 kg (150 lb) category at the World Wushu Championship; he also placed first in both the China Wushu Championship and the Chinese Warrior in WLF. He was the runner-up in three championships in 2010, 2012, and 2014.

Dong has fought against Andy Souwer, Albert Kraus, Aikpracha Meenayothin and Buakaw Banchamek in K-1 Rule.

== Career ==
On May 9, 2009, at Wulinfeng, Dong beat Ge Xukun by KO.

On December 19, 2009, at the Kung Fu vs Muaythai Championships held at Lingnan Pearl Stadium, the second scene was Dong versus BigBen in the 65 kg (143 lb) class. Due to the disadvantage of wrestling, Dong lost to BigBen by a decision.

On the evening of 31 March 2011, at the Wuxing World Championship -Wulin King's Competition for Hegemony in Jiangmen, Guangdong, Dong beat Arthit Hanchana by decision.

On the evening of April 19, 2011, at the finals of the championship of the Chinese Sanshou Championship held in Wuyishan Stadium, Fujian, Dong beat Ye by decision, winning the Chinese Sanshou Champion 70 kg (150 lb) class.

On November 1, 2011, Chinese Kung Fu King Championship were held in Haikou Stadium, Hainan, Dong beat Zhao by TKO, winning the Chinese Kung Fu King Champion 70 kg.

On September 25, 2012, Guangyuan International Kickboxing Championship were held in Golden Seed Stadium, Anhui, Dong beat Vladimir by decision.

On December 31, 2012, Wu Lin Feng World Championship were held in Beijing University of Science and Technology Gymnasium, In quarter finals Dong beat Gustavo Mendes by KO, in semi finals, he beat Zhou by decision, but in the final he lost to Albert Kraus by TKO.

On June 6, 2013, at the Wu Lin Feng World Championship held in Dubai Convention and Exhibition Center, UAE, Dong versus Mohammed Salem. Dong used a low kick to knock Salem down several times, then Salem's referee submitted in the first round.

On August 10, 2013, at the MAX Muay Thai held in a Henan television studio, Dong fought Buakaw Banchamek; he lost following a split decision from the judges.

On January 18, 2014, at the Wu Lin Feng World Championship held in Xiangyang, Hubei, Dong beat Michael Krcmar and Sun but in the final he lost to Seyedisa Alamdarnezam by decision.

On April 29, 2014, at commemorations for the 95th anniversary of the May 4th movement held in Xiangcheng, Henan, Dong was awarded 2014 Top Ten Outstanding Youth in the Eighth Urban Event.

== Championships and awards ==
- Kickboxing
- 2018 S-1 Muaythai Welterweight World Champion 71 kg
- 2015 WLF Intercontinental Champion 75 kg
- 2014 WLF 4 Man Tournament Runner-up
- 2014 WLF-World 8 Man Tournament -70 kg Runner-up
- 2012 WLF Chinese Warriors 70 kg
- 2012 WLF-World 8 Man Tournament -70 kg Runner-up
- 2010 WLF-World 8 Man Tournament -70 kg Runner-up
- Sanshou
- 2011 Chinese Kung Fu King 70 kg
- 2011 Chinese Sanshou Champion 70 kg
- 2009 Guangdong International Wushu champion

== Kickboxing record ==
Kickboxing record
55 wins (20 (T)KOs), 17 losses
Date	Result	Opponent	Event	Location	Method	Round	Time
2019-07-21	Loss	(Japan) Daisuke Fujimura	KRUSH 103	Japan	Decision (Unanimous)	3	3:00
2019-01-19	Win	(Romania) Alex Bublea	Wu Lin Feng	Haikou, China	TKO (3 Knockdowns)	1	1:20
2018-12-08	Win	(Thailand) Daoden Korat	S1 World Championships & Wu Lin Feng	Chum Saeng, Thailand	TKO (Punches)	2	
Wins the 2018 S-1 Muaythai Welterweight World Champion 71 kg
2018-11-07	Win	(Russia) Ruslan	Wu Lin Feng	Hong Kong, China	KO (Overhand Left)	1	
2018-10-06	Win	(Greece) Giannis Boukis	Wu Lin Feng	Huiyang, China	Decision (Unanimous)	3	3:00
2018-05-05	Win	(Germany) Dima Weimer	Wu Lin Feng	Nanyang, China	Decision (Unanimous)	3	3:00
2018-04-07	Win	(United States) Will Jope	East of Dragon	Weifang, China	Decision (Unanimous)	3	3:00
First fight after more than 2 years break due to back injury.
2016-01-02	Win	(Netherlands) Steve Mansworth	Wu Lin Feng	Hong Kong, China	Decision (Unanimous)	3	3:00
2015-12-12	Win	(Russia) Alexei Florov	Wu Lin Feng	Beijing, China	TKO (Cut)	2	
2015-10-24	Win	(South Africa) Warren Stevelmans	Wu Lin Feng	Hong Kong, China	Decision (Unanimous)	3	3:00
2015-09-05	Win	(Japan) Masashi Fukuda	Wu Lin Feng	Guangzhou, China	KO (Punch)	1	
2015-08-29	Win	(Malaysia) Kai Chee	Wu Lin Feng	Zhoukou, China	N/A	N/A	N/A
2015-08-08	Win	(Brazil)	Wu Lin Feng	Xi'an, China	N/A	N/A	N/A
2015-04-04	Loss	(Netherlands) Andy Souwer	Wu Lin Feng	Zhengzhou, China	Decision (Unanimous)	3	3:00
2015-03-28	Win	(Thailand) Thodkhui MR.Manas	Wu Lin Feng	Zhumadian, China	Decision (Unanimous)	3	3:00
2015-03-07	Win	(Thailand) Phayakkhaphon Thong Kham	Wu Lin Feng	Zhengzhou, China	Decision (Unanimous)	3	3:00
2014-12-27	Win	(Malaysia) Haws Bin	Wu Lin Feng	Pingdingshan, China	TKO (Low Kick)	1	1:50
2014-12-19	Win	N/A	Wu Lin Feng	Weinang, China	Decision (Unanimous)	3	3:00
2014-11-16	Win	(Spain) Alonso	Wu Lin Feng	Changsha, China	Decision (Unanimous)	3	3:00
2014-03-15	Loss	(New Zealand) Harley Love	Wu Lin Feng-4 Man Tournament, Final	Auckland, New Zealand	TKO (Flying Knee)	1	0:30
2014-03-15	Win	(New Zealand) Ricky Campbell	Wu Lin Feng-4 Man Tournament, Semi Finals	Auckland, New Zealand	Decision (Unanimous)	3	3:00
2014-01-18	Loss	(Iran) Seyedisa Alamdarnezam	Wu Lin Feng-70 kg Tournament, Final	Xiangyang, China	Decision (Unanimous)	3	3:00
2014-01-18	Win	(China) Sun Weiqiang	Wu Lin Feng-70 kg Tournament, Semi Finals	Xiangyang, China	Decision (Unanimous)	3	3:00
2014-01-18	Win	(Czech Republic) Michael Krcmar	Wu Lin Feng-70 kg Tournament, Quarter Finals	Xiangyang, China	Decision (Split)	3	3:00
2013-11-27	Win	(Brazil) Jose Neto	Wu Lin Feng	Anyang, China	Decision (Unanimous)	3	3:00
2013-11-22	Win	(Italy) Simone Ballerini	Wu Lin Feng	Langfang, China	Decision (Unanimous)	3	3:00
2013-11-02	Loss	(United States) Raul Rodriguez	Wu Lin Feng	Las Vegas, US	Decision (Split)	3	3:00
2013-08-24	Win	(Germany) Valdet Gates	Wu Lin Feng	Huaibei, China	Decision (Unanimous)	3	3:00
2013-08-10	Loss	(Thailand) Buakaw Banchamek	MAX Muay Thai 3	Zhengzhou, China	Decision (Split)	3	3:00
2013-06-06	Win	(Yemen) Mohammed Salem	Wu Lin Feng	Dubai, UAE	TKO (Throw in the towel)	1	1:23
2013-05-09	Win	(Brazil) Jackson Alves	Wu Lin Feng	Nanyang, China	Decision (Unanimous)	3	3:00
2013-04-25	Loss	(Thailand) Sonchai Me.Mai	Wu Lin Feng	Zhengzhou, China	Decision (Unanimous)	3	3:00
2013-03-31	Win	(Thailand) Bangrajun Por. Pramuk	Wu Lin Feng	Taizhou, China	Decision (Unanimous)	3	3:00
2012-12-31	Loss	(Netherlands) Albert Kraus	Wu Lin Feng-70 kg Tournament, Final	Beijing, China	TKO (High Kick)	2	2:45
2012-12-31	Win	(China) Zhou Zhipeng	Wu Lin Feng-70 kg Tournament, Semi Finals	Beijing, China	Decision (Unanimous)	3	3:00
2012-12-31	Win	(Brazil) Gustavo Mendes	Wu Lin Feng-70 kg Tournament, Quarter Finals	Beijing, China	TKO (Punch)	2	1:00
2012-10-20	Loss	(Thailand) Theerawat Yoohanngoh	Wu Lin Feng	Zhengzhou, China	DQ (Kneed in the groin)	2	0:20
2012-09-25	Win	(Croatia) Vladimir	Guangyuan International Kickboxing Championship	Hefei, China	Decision (Unanimous)	3	3:00
2012-09-14	Win	(China) Xiao Kaiyu	Wu Lin Feng	Zhengzhou, China	KO (Punch)	1	2:40
2012-08-03	Win	(China) Wang Xuguang	Wu Lin Feng	Zhengzhou, China	KO (Knee)	3	0:35
2012-06-23	Win	(Iran) Ibrahimov	Wu Lin Feng-Wu Xing Tian Xia	Foshan, China	Decision (Unanimous)	3	3:00
2012-05-12	Win	(China) Sheng Hui	Wu Lin Feng	Zhengzhou, China	TKO (Low Kick)	2	2:25
2011-11-10	Loss	(Thailand) Aikpracha Meenayothin	Kung Fu vs Muaythai	Haikou, China	TKO (Punch)	2	0:20
2011-11-01	Win	(China) Zhao Eridemutu	Chinese Kung Fu King Championship Final	Haikou, China	TKO (Punch)	1	0:50
2011-10-30	Win	(China) Zhao Shuai	Chinese Kung Fu King Championship Semi-finals	Haikou, China	TKO (Low Kick)	2	0:34
2011-04-29	Win	(Malaysia) Mohammed	Wu Lin Feng-Wu Xing Tian Xia	Jiangmen, China	Decision (Unanimous)	3	3:00
2011-03-31	Win	(Thailand) Arthit Hanchana	Wu Lin Feng-Wu Xing Tian Xia	Jiangmen, China	Decision (Unanimous)	3	3:00
2010-10-15	Win	(China) Zhu Aiwei	CKA	Weinan, China	Decision (Unanimous)	5	2:00
2010-05-28	Loss	(South Africa) Vuyisile Colossa	Wu Lin Feng-2010 WLF World Championship Final	Zhengzhou, China	Ex.R Decision (Unanimous)	4	3:00
2010-04-24	Win	(China) Zhao Yafei	Wu Lin Feng-2010 WLF World Championship Semi-finals	Zhengzhou, China	Decision (Unanimous)	3	3:00
2010-01-17	Win	(China) Zhang Kenan	CKA	Hangzhou, China	Decision (Unanimous)	5	2:00
2010-01-16	Win	(China) Zhou Jiankun	CKA	Hangzhou, China	Decision (Unanimous)	5	2:00
2009-12-19	Loss	(Thailand) Big Ben Chor Praram 6	Kung Fu vs Muaythai	Foshan, China	Decision (Unanimous)	3	3:00
2009-11-07	Win	(China) Shao Yalei	CKA	Baoding, China	Decision (Unanimous)	5	2:00
2009-09-12	Win	(China) Xiao Jie	Wu Lin Feng	Zhengzhou, China	TKO (Punch)	2	1:40
2009-06-26	Win	(Italy)	Wu Lin Zheng Ba	Guangzhou, China	TKO (Throw in the towel)	2	1:10
2009-06-18	Win	(China) Zhou Jiankun	CKA	Beijing, China	Decision (Unanimous)	5	2:00
2009-06-12	Win	(China) Shao Yalei	CKA	Beijing, China	Decision (Unanimous)	5	2:00
2009-05-23	Win	(South Africa) Vuyisile Colossa	Wu Lin Feng	Zhengzhou, China	Decision (Unanimous)	3	3:00
2009-05-09	Win	(China) Ge Xukun	Wu Lin Feng	Zhengzhou, China	KO (Knee)	1	1:00
2009-05-02	Win	(China) Zhang Houzhen	Wu Lin Feng	Zhengzhou, China	Decision (Unanimous)	3	3:00
2009-04-25	Win	(China) Zhu Aiwei	Wu Lin Feng	Zhengzhou, China	KO (Knee)	1	1:08
2009-04-18	Win	(China) Zhao He	Wu Lin Feng	Zhengzhou, China	Decision (Unanimous)	3	3:00
2009-04-04	Loss	(China) Zhou Jiankun	Wu Lin Feng	Zhengzhou, China	Decision (Unanimous)	3	3:00
2009-03-28	Win	(China) Chen Qian	Wu Lin Feng	Zhengzhou, China	KO (Knee)	2	1:08
2009-03-21	Win	(China) Du Guangqiang	Wu Lin Feng	Zhengzhou, China	TKO (High Kick)	2	1:37
2009-01-03	Loss	(China) Wei Shoulei	Wu Lin Feng	Zhengzhou, China	Decision (Unanimous)	3	3:00
2008-12-27	Win	(China) Xiao Jijian	Wu Lin Feng	Zhengzhou, China	KO (Punch)	1	0:42
2008-08-30	Loss	(China) Wei Shoulei	Wu Lin Feng	Zhengzhou, China	Decision (Unanimous)	3	3:00
2008-07-19	Loss	(China) Xu Xizhen	Wu Lin Feng	Zhengzhou, China	Decision (Unanimous)	3	3:00
2008-07-05	Win	(China) Wang Xuyang	Wu Lin Feng	Zhengzhou, China	Decision (Unanimous)	3	3:00
Legend: Win Loss Draw/No contest Notes
