= Yang Zhuo =

Chinese Sanshou kickboxer

- Born: April 7, 1989 (age 37); Dalian, Liaoning, China
- Native name: 杨茁
- Other names: Dynamite
- Nationality: Chinese
- Height: 1.74 m (5 ft 8 1/2 in)
- Weight: 67.0 kg (147.7 lb; 10.55 st)
- Division: Featherweight; Lightweight
- Style: Sanda, Kickboxing
- Stance: Orthodox
- Fighting out of: China
- Team: Zhengzhou Shun Yuan Fight Club
- Years active: 2009–present

Kickboxing record
- Total: 80
- Wins: 60
- By knockout: 17
- Losses: 19
- Draws: 1

Mixed martial arts record
- Total: 5
- Wins: 3
- By knockout: 1
- By submission: 2
- Losses: 2
- By submission: 1
- By decision: 1

Other information
- Website: http://weibo.com/517897099
- Last updated on: February 3, 2018

Yang Zhuo (Chinese: 杨茁; pinyin: Yáng Zhuó) is a Chinese former Wushu fighter and current kickboxer who competes in both Featherweight and Lightweight division. A multiple time provincial and national Sanshou titlist in his home country. Yang later made the switch to kickboxing. As of 1 November 2018, he is ranked the #8 featherweight in the world by Combat Press.

Yang Zhuo began sanshou training at an early age and rose to prominence by winning provincial titles in his native Liaoning several years consecutively. In the summer of 2009, he began to fight in Wu Lin Feng.

== Career ==
On October 26, 2014, in the Kunlun Fight 12 4-Man 65 kg tournament semifinals, Yang beat Matt Embree by decision. He won the final against Phosa Nopphorn by TKO.

On July 4, 2015, in Wu Lin Feng World Championship 2015 – 67 kg Tournament Semi Finals, Yang beat Jomthong Chuwattana by Ex.R decision.

In the final he faced Qiu jianliang and in the second round Yang knocked Qiu down several times, almost finishing him. Yang then won a unanimous decision victory from the judges.

== Championships and awards ==
- Kickboxing
  - 2017 Kunlun Fight 16-Man 66kg tournament champion
  - 2015 WLF World Championship Tournament −67 kg champion -67 kg
  - 2014 Wu Lin Feng World champion -67 kg
  - 2014 Kunlun Fight 4-Man 65 kg tournament champion -65 kg
- Ranking
  - N°8 Combat Press.com at Featherweight, June, 2018

== Fight record ==
Professional Kickboxing Record
60 wins (17 (T)KOs), 19 losses, 1 draw
Date	Result	Opponent	Event	Location	Method	Round	Time
2021-09-25	Loss	(Thailand) Wacharalek	Wu Lin Feng 2021: WLF in Tangshan	Tangshan, China	Decision	3	3:00
2019-01-19	Loss	(Thailand) Petchtanong Banchamek	Wu Lin Feng 2019: WLF World Cup 2018-2019 Final Semi Finals	Haikou, China	Decision (Unanimous)	3	3:00
2018-12-01	Win	(Belarus) Andrei Kulebin	Wu Lin Feng -67kg World Cup 2018-2019 Group D	Zhengzhou, China	Decision (Split)	3	3:00
2018-10-06	Win	(China) Hu Yafei	Wu Lin Feng 2018: WLF -67kg World Cup 2018-2019 4th Round	Shangqiu, China	Decision (Unanimous)	3	3:00
2018-08-04	Win	(Russia) Sergey Kosykh	Wu Lin Feng 2018: WLF -67kg World Cup 2018-2019 2nd Round	Zhengzhou, China	Decision (Unanimous)	3	3:00
2018-04-07	Win	(Romania) Alex Bublea	Wu Lin Feng 2018: World Championship Shijiazhuang	Shijiazhuang, China	Decision (Unanimous)	3	3:00
2018-02-03	Win	(Papua New Guinea) Jonathan Tuhu	Wu Lin Feng 2018: World Championship in Shenzhen	Shenzhen, China	Decision (Unanimous)	3	3:00
2018-01-20	Win	(Iran) Hussein Manşūrī	EM-Legend	Yuxi, China	TKO	3	
2017-11-12	Win	(Thailand) Singdam Kiatmuu9	Kunlun Fight 67 - 66kg World Championship, Final	Sanya, China	Decision (2-1)	3	3:00
Wins the Kunlun Fight 16 Man 66kg Tournament
2017-11-12	Win	(Spain) David Mejia	Kunlun Fight 67 - 66kg World Championship, Semi Finals	Sanya, China	Decision (Unanimous)	3	3:00
2017-11-12	Win	(China) Wei Ninghui	Kunlun Fight 67 - 66kg World Championship, Quarter Finals	Sanya, China	Decision (Majority)	3	3:00
2017-10-14	Win	(Netherlands) Ouail Karroumi	Wu Lin Feng 2017: World Championship Hong Kong	Hong Kong, China	Decision (Unanimous)	3	3:00
2017-09-03	Win	(Romania) Adrian Pețenchea	Wu Lin Feng 2017: World Championship Xi'an	Zhengzhou, China	Decision (Unanimous)	3	3:00
2017-08-27	Win	(Japan) Kenta	Kunlun Fight 65 - Kunlun Fight 16 Man Tournament 66 kg-1/8 finals	Qingdao, China	Decision (Unanimous)	3	3:00
2017-08-05	Win	(Thailand) Ratchasing	Wu Lin Feng 2017: China VS Thailand	Zhengzhou, China	Decision (Unanimous)	3	3:00
2017-07-15	Win	(Australia) Lindon Wotton	Wu Lin Feng 2017: Australia VS China	Sydney, Australia	Decision (Unanimous)	3	3:00
2017-06-03	Win	(Japan) Fumiya Kato	Wu Lin Feng 2017: China VS Japan	Changsha, China	Decision (Unanimous)	3	3:00
2017-05-16	Win	(Canada) Jason Hinds	Wu Lin Feng 2017: East VS West	Toronto, Canada	Decision (Split)	3	3:00
2017-04-01	Win	(Germany) Rafik Habiat	Wu Lin Feng 2017: China VS Europe	Zhengzhou, China	Decision (Unanimous)	3	3:00
2017-01-14	Win	(France) Charles François	Glory of Heroes 6: Genesis	Jiyuan, China	Decision (Unanimous)	3	3:00
2016-12-03	Win	(Japan) Waki Mitauharu	Wu Lin Feng 2016: WLF x Krush - China vs Japan	Zhengzhou, China	Decision (Unanimous)	3	3:00
2016-10-29	Win	(Greece) Socratis Kerpatsi	Rise of Heroes 3	Changji, China	KO	1	
2016-10-01	Win	(Angola) Luis Passos	Glory of Heroes 5	Zhengzhou, China	Decision (Unanimous)	3	3:00
2016-07-02	Loss	(France) Fabio Pinca	Glory of Heroes 3	Jiyuan, China	Decision (Split)	3	3:00
2016-05-07	Loss	(Netherlands) Massaro Glunder	Glory of Heroes 2	Shenzhen, China	Decision (Split)	3	3:00
2016-04-10	Loss	(Greece) Socratis Kerpatsi	Wu Lin Feng & Gods of War 8	Marousi, Greece	Decision (Split)	3	3:00
2016-01-23	Win	(United Kingdom) Craig Dickson	Wu Lin Feng 2016: World Kickboxing Championship in Shanghai	Shanghai, China	KO (right hook)	1	
2015-12-26	Win	(United Kingdom) Craig Dickson	ACC fighting champion	Quanzhou, China	Decision (Unanimous)	3	3:00
2015-12-05	Loss	(Thailand) Phayaluang Cho.hapayak	Wu Lin Feng King's Cup 2015 Celebrating the King's Birthday	Bangkok, Thailand	Decision (Unanimous)	3	3:00
For the S1 Muaythai Welterweight Intercontinental title.
2015-11-10	Win	(United States) Matt Theos	Wu Lin Feng & WCK Muaythai: China vs USA	Las Vegas, Nevada, USA	Decision (Unanimous)	3	3:00
2015-10-28	Win	(Japan) Takeshita	KOF.MTK	Nanjing, China	KO	2	
2015-10-14	Win	(Germany) Maurice Lohner	Wu Lin Feng 2015	Hong Kong, China	Decision (Unanimous)	3	3:00
2015-08-22	Win	(Netherlands) Tyjani Beztati	Wu Lin Feng 2015	Xiamen, China	Decision (Unanimous)	3	3:00
2015-08-01	Win	(United Kingdom) Ruth Edmonton	Wu Lin Feng 2015	Zhengzhou, China	TKO (3 knockdowns)	1	
2015-07-04	Win	(China) Qiu Jianliang	Wu Lin Feng 2015 World 67 kg Tournament, final	Zhengzhou, China	Decision (Unanimous)	3	3:00
Wins the Wu Lin Feng 2015 World 67 kg Tournament.
2015-07-04	Win	(Thailand) Jomthong Chuwattana	Wu Lin Feng 2015 World 67 kg Tournament, semi-finals	Zhengzhou, China	Ex.R Decision (Split)	4	3:00
2015-06-26	Win	(Thailand) Thodkhui MR.Manas	Silk Road Hero	Ürümqi, China	TKO	2	
2015-05-29	Loss	(Germany) Maurice Lohner	Wu Lin Feng 2015 & Day of Destruction 10	Hamburg, Germany	Decision (Unanimous)	3	3:00
2015-04-04	Win	(China) Wang Pengfei	Wu Lin Feng 2015 World 67 kg Tournament, quarter final	Zhengzhou, China	TKO	2	
2015-04-04	Win	(Japan) Komiya Yukihiro	Wu Lin Feng 2015 World 67 kg Tournament, 1st round	Zhengzhou, China	Decision (Unanimous)	3	3:00
2015-01-31	Loss	(Russia) Khayal Dzhaniev	2015 WLF World 8 Man Tournament −67 kg-semi finals	Chongqing, China	Decision (Unanimous)	3	3:00
2015-01-31	Win	(Republic of Ireland) Sandile Frans	2015 WLF World 8 Man Tournament −67 kg-quarter finals	Chongqing, China	Decision (Unanimous)	3	3:00
2014-12-04	Win	(South Korea) Beack Manseng	Kunlun Fight 14	Bangkok, Thailand	KO	3	
2014-10-26	Win	(Thailand) Phosa Nopphorn	Kunlun Fight 12 - Kunlun Fight 4 Man Tournament 65 kg-final	Jianshui, China	TKO	3	
Wins the Kunlun Fight 4 Man -65 kg Tournament.
2014-10-26	Win	(Canada) Matt Embree	Kunlun Fight 12 - Kunlun Fight 4 Man Tournament 65 kg-semi finals	Jianshui, China	Decision (Unanimous)	3	3:00
2014-10-19	Win	(Sweden) Felipe	I am National Hero	Zhengzhou, China	KO	1	
2014-10-05	Win	(South Korea) Kim Dongsu	Kunlun Fight 11	Macao, China	Ex.R Decision (Unanimous)	4	3:00
2014-08-30	Win	(China) Tie Yinghua	2014 Wu Lin Feng World Championship -67 kg final	Hong Kong, China	Ex.R Decision (Unanimous)	4	3:00
Wins the 2014 WLF World -67 kg title.
2014-08-30	Win	(Australia) Victor Nagbe	2014 Wu Lin Feng World Championship -67 kg semi-finals	Hong Kong, China	Decision (Unanimous)	3	3:00
2014-08-16	Win	(Japan) Mishima	Wu Lin Feng 2014	Zhejiang, China	KO	1	1:00
2014-08-12	Loss	(Thailand) Sangnapha Tor Saengtiennoi	Wu Lin Feng & Thailand Queen's Cup 2014	Bangkok, Thailand	Decision (Unanimous)	3	3:00
2014-07-18	Win	(Thailand) Shaman	Wu Lin Feng 2014	Dingyuan, China	Decision (Unanimous)	3	3:00
2014-06-20	Win	(Thailand) Ardang	I am National Hero	Xuchang, China	Decision (Unanimous)	3	3:00
2014-05-24	Win	(Italy) Calogero Palmeri	Wu Lin Feng & Yokkao 9	Xinyang, China	Decision (Unanimous)	3	3:00
2014-04-14	Loss	(Belarus) Andrei Kulebin	Combat Banchamek	Surin, Thailand	Decision (unanimous)	3	3:00
2014-03-30	Win	(Democratic Republic of the Congo) Kome	I am National Hero	Pingdingshan, China	Decision (Unanimous)	3	3:00
2014-03-15	Win	(New Zealand) Ambrose Smac	Wu Lin Feng	Auckland, New Zealand	Decision (Unanimous)	3	3:00
2013-10-28	Win	(Thailand) Pongthong Jetsada	Kunlun Fight-Beijing media promotion special fight-Final	Beijing, China	Decision (Unanimous)	3	3:00
2013-10-28	Win	(South Korea)	Kunlun Fight-Beijing media promotion special fight-Semi finals	Beijing, China	TKO (3 Knockdowns)	2	
2013-09-28	Win	(Thailand) Chairit Neephonkrang	Wu Lin Feng	Shenzhen, China	Decision (Unanimous)	3	3:00
2013-08-16	Win	(United Kingdom) Picken	Wu Lin Feng	Hami, Xinjiang, China	Decision (Unanimous)	3	3:00
2013-04-13	Win	(Kyrgyzstan) Mika	Wu Lin Feng	Zhejiang, China	Decision (Unanimous)	3	3:00
2013-03-23	Win	(France) Pittle	Wu Lin Feng	Zhengzhou, China	KO (left low kick)	1	
2012-12-09	Win	(Thailand) Harphyayak Chuwattana	Real - Real Fight MMA Championship 1 Kickboxing match	Zhengzhou, China	TKO (Punch)	3	
2012-09-21	Loss	(China) Zheng Zhaoyu	Wu Lin Feng	Anhui, China	Decision (Unanimous)	3	3:00
2011-08-06	Loss	(China) Zhang Zhen	Wu Lin Feng	Henan, China	Decision	3	3:00
2011-04-16	Loss	(China) Zhou Jiankun	Wu Lin Feng	Henan, China	Decision	3	3:00
2011-05-01	Draw	(Thailand) Armin Pumpanmuang	Wu Lin Feng	Nanchang China	Ex.R Decision	4	3:00
2011-04-23	Win	(Taiwan) Zhang Jingxong	WBC Muaythai	Nanning, China	TKO	1	
2011-03-05	Loss	(China) An Ruxin	Wu Lin Feng	Henan, China	Decision	3	3:00
2011-01-15	Loss	(South Korea) Lee Su-Hwan	Wu Lin Feng	Henan, China	Decision	3	3:00
2010-12-06	Win	(China) Tie Yinghua	Wu Lin Feng	Zhengzhou, China	KO (Punch)	2	
2010-10-30	Win	(China) Chen Daben	Wu Lin Feng	Las Vegas, Nevada, USA	Decision	3	3:00
2010-09-18	Win	(China) Pan Guoshui	Wu Lin Feng	Zhengzhou, China	Decision	3	3:00
2010-05-01	Loss	(United States) Shane Oblonsky	Wu Lin Feng	Henan, China	Decision	3	3:00
2010-03-29	Loss	(South Africa) Vuyisile Colossa	Wu Lin Feng	Henan, China	Decision	3	3:00
2009-11-11	Win	(China) Kang Xin	Battlefield X1	Beijing, China	TKO	2	
2009-10-17	Loss	(China) Jiang Zhenghui	Wu Lin Feng	Zhengzhou, China	Decision (Unanimous)	3	3:00
2009-06-19	Win	(Thailand) Samranchai 96Peenang	Wu Lin Feng	Zhengzhou, China	Decision (Unanimous)	3	3:00
Legend: Win Loss Draw/No contest Notes

Amateur Kickboxing Record
Date	Result	Opponent	Event	Location	Method	Round	Time
2017-04-17	Loss	(China) Li Yinggang	2017 Chinese kickboxing Championship	Shenzhen, China	Decision (Unanimous)	3	3:00
Legend: Win Loss Draw/No contest Notes

== Mixed martial arts record ==
Professional record breakdown
5 matches	3 wins	2 losses
By knockout	1	0
By submission	2	1
By decision	0	1

Res.	Record	Opponent	Method	Event	Date	Round	Time	Location	Notes
Win	3–2	Alexander Ogawa	TKO (Punches)	Real - Real Fight MMA Championship 3	Oct 20, 2013	1	0:25	Beijing, China	
Win	2–2	Sardorbek Qodirov	Submission (Guillotine Choke)	WLF MMA Championship Dubai 2013	Jun 6, 2013	2		Dubai, United Arab Emirates	
Loss	1–2	Jonny Gilbertson	Decision (Unanimous)	Real - Real Fight MMA Championship 2	May 11, 2013	3	5:00	Zhengzhou, China	
Loss	1–1	Kairat Akhmetov	Submission (Rear-Naked Choke)	AP - Alash Pride 2	Dec 22, 2012	1	1:30	Almaty, Kazakhstan	
Win	1–0	Kenny Yeung	Submission (Rear-Naked Choke)	Legend FC - Legend Fighting Championship 3	Sep 24, 2010	3	4:05	Hong Kong, China	
