= Vuyisile Colossa =

South African hybrid martial artist

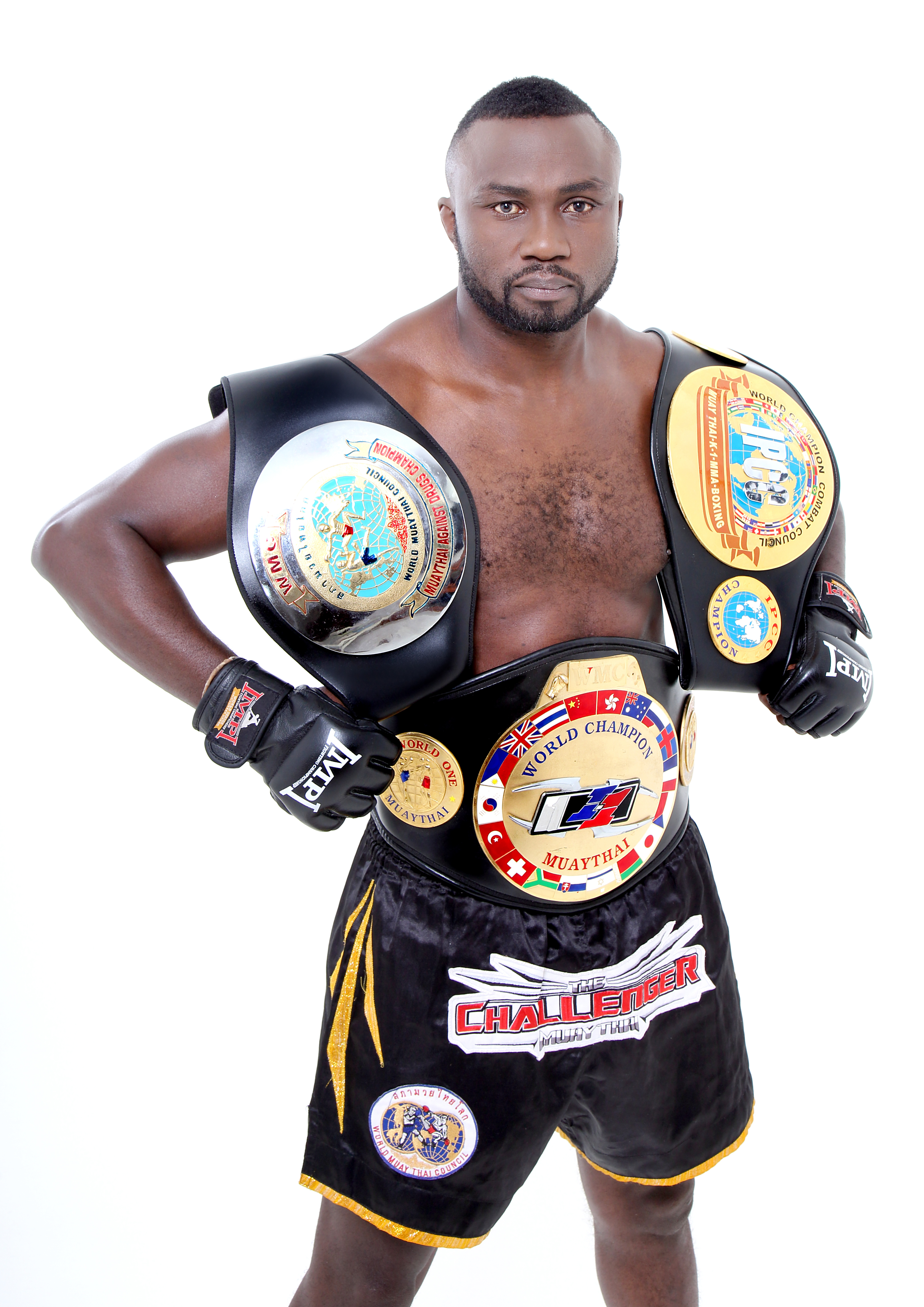
- Born: Vuyisile Colossa; 28 June 1982 (age 44); Welkom, Thabong, Free State, South Africa
- Other names: 胡斯哥路沙, #MASTERVUSI
- Nationality: South African
- Height: 1.78 m (5 ft 10 in)
- Weight: 70 kg (154 lb; 11 st)
- Division: Lightweight (155lb); Middleweight (kickboxing)
- Style: Muay Thai, kickboxing
- Fighting out of: Hong Kong
- Team: Master Vusi Martial Arts

Kickboxing record
- Total: 48
- Wins: 31
- By knockout: 14
- Losses: 16
- Draws: 1

Mixed martial arts record
- Total: 13
- Wins: 8
- By knockout: 3
- By submission: 3
- By decision: 2
- Losses: 5
- By knockout: 1
- By submission: 1
- By decision: 3

Other information
- Mixed martial arts record from Sherdog
- Last updated on: 29 June 2014

Vuyisile Colossa (born 28 June 1982) is a South African professional mixed martial artist and kickboxer, a 5-time world champion in kickboxing and Muay Thai. He has been a professional competitor in kickboxing since 2002 and a professional MMA competitor since 2010.

== Background ==
Originally from the mining town of Welkom, Thabong in South Africa, Colossa was active in sports growing up. At Leseding Technical School, Colossa competed in baseball, cricket, basketball, and rugby. Two years later, Colossa moved on to THS Welkom where he also began competing in hockey. At the age of 15, Colossa began training in kickboxing.

== Career ==
=== Kickboxing and Muay Thai ===
Colossa finished in third place in the Free State Championships and was granted a spot on South Africa's first team. He then went on to win a bronze medal in the South Africa Fighting Championships. In 1999, he won the BIG Five Championships and came second in the Free State Championships. He then achieved second place in the 2000 SA Championships. In 2001, Colossa came third in the SA trials in Pretoria and was awarded his national colors. As a result of this success, he was chosen to represent South Africa in Vienna, Austria.

In 2002, he made his professional kickboxing debut. Colossa won his first two titles: South African Full-Contact Kickboxing Championship and the Ring Contact Fighting Art International Welterweight Kickboxing Champion Title. He received the Premier's Youth Award in Bloemfontein. He was honored by the department of Sport, Arts, Culture, Science and Technology for his exceptional achievement in the field of sport.

In 2003, he was crowned the South African Professional Kickboxing Council Champion, Muay Thai Champion and was also the runner-up for the W.A.K.O. Professional World Championship. Later that year, he attained his first degree black belt in Ring Contact Fighting Art. In 2006, he was the runner-up of the King of the Ring World Title, and then went on to make his debut in K-1 Khan Fighting in South Korea.

In 2008, Colossa competed in various major events in Asia. He faced Naruepol Fairtex at Planet Battle in Hong Kong in June 2008 and Yodsaenklai Fairtex at Planet Battle in November 2008.

In 2009, Colossa competed in I-1 World Grand Slam in Hong Kong in October and I-1 Grand Extreme in Macau in November, coming second in both four-man tournaments.

In January 2010, Colossa took part in his first reality TV show in Enfusion: Test of the Champions in Koh Samui, Thailand. Later that year he won the Wu Lin Feng Golden Dragon Belt at King of the Ring Eight-man Tournament in Zhengzhou, China.

In June 2011 he became a contestant on The Challenger Muay Thai, where he won the Muay Thai Against Drugs belt against American Michael Chase Corley, during the series finale. The show was broadcast worldwide on AXN in September 2011, and continues to show on international networks around the world. At the end of that year he competed once again in I-1 Grand Slam four-man tournament in Hong Kong, this time emerging victorious with the belt.

On 3 April 2012, Colossa fought against the notable Muay Thai fighter Saiyok Pumpanmuang in the semi-finals of the WMC tournament.

=== Mixed martial arts ===
Colossa made his professional MMA debut in May 2010. He began his career with a record of 4-1 with his only defeat being a controversial decision loss to URCC Welterweight Champion Eduard Folayang.

Outside the ring, Colossa founded and held several IMPI World Series since 2014 with live coverage from NowTV Sports, gaining the reputation as Hong Kong's Original Caged MMA event.

==== ONE Fighting Championship ====
In September 2011, it was announced that Colossa had signed a three-year contract with ONE Fighting Championship. He fought Ma Xing Yu at ONE Fighting Championship: Champion vs. Champion at the Singapore Indoor Stadium on 3 September, winning via stoppage early in the opening round. After the fight, Colossa announced that he wanted to fight for the One FC lightweight belt.

He faced Lowen Tynanes at ONE Fighting Championship: Return of Warriors in February 2013. He lost the fight via rear-naked choke submission on the dying seconds of the third round.

Colossa rebounded with a series of wins in his two most recent appearances in ONE FC; he defeated Kotetsu Boku by decision in September 2013 and Caros Fodor by decision in December 2013.

In June 2014, it was announced that Colossa has signed with the UFC. He was expected to make his debut for the promotion on 23 August 2014 at UFC Fight Night: Bisping vs. Le. However, a bout on that card never materialized and it appeared that he had a contract with ONE Fighting Championship that was due to expire in late September 2014.

Colossa was scheduled to face Caros Fodor in a rematch at ONE FC 20: Rise of the Kingdom taking place on 12 September 2014. However, Colossa pulled out at the last minute due to injury.

== Championships and accomplishments ==
=== Kickboxing and Muay Thai ===
- International Professional Combat Council
  - 2014 International Professional Combat Council(IPCC) 73 kg Champion
- World Muaythai Council
  - 2012 WMC I-1 Champion
  - 2011 WMC Muaythai Against Drugs (MAD) Champion
- King's Cup
  - 2010 King's Cup Finalist
- Wu Lin Feng
  - 2010 WLF 70 kg World 8 Man Tournament Champion
- Ring Contact Fighting Art International
  - 2002 Ring Contact Fighting Art International Champion
  - South African RCFA Amateur Champion
- South African Kickboxing Association
  - 2002 South African Welterweight Kickboxing Champion
- South African Muaythai Federation
  - South African Muay Thai Middleweight Champion
- Professional Kickboxing Council
  - South African Professional Kickboxing Council (P.K.C) Middleweight Champion

== Kickboxing record ==
Kickboxing and Muay Thai record
31 wins (14 (T)KOs, 16 decisions), 16 losses
Date	Result	Opponent	Event	Location	Method	Round	Time
2019-05-28	Draw	(Thailand) Yodwicha Banchamek	MAS Fight	Hong Kong	Draw	1	9:00
2016-11-05	Win	(China) Zheng Zhaoyu	Wu Lin Feng	China	Decision (extra round)	4	3:00
2016-07-31	Win	(China) Nurla Mulali	Kunlun Fight 48	Jining, China	Decision (extra round)	4	3:00
2016-06-05	Loss	(China) Bo fufan	Kunlun Fight 45	Chengdu, China	Decision (unanimous)	3	3:00
2015-01-03	Win	(Netherlands) Duoli Chen	Kunlun Fight 15: The World MAX Return	Nanjing, China	Decision	3	3:00
2014-06-29	Win	(China) Xu Zhenguang	Kunlun Fight 6	Chongqing, China	Decision	3	3:00
2012-12-31	Loss	(China) Wang Wei Hao	Wu Lin Feng 70 kg Tournament, Quarter-finals	Beijing, China	Decision	3	3:00
2011-11-05	Loss	(China) Aotegen Bateer	Hero Legend	Changsha, China	Decision	3	3:00
2011-09-25	Loss	(Australia) Frank Giorgi	Thai Fight 2011 70 kg Tournament, Quarter-final	Bangkok, Thailand	Decision	3	3:00
2011-04-23	Loss	(United States) Ky Hollenbeck	W.C.K. Muaythai Show	Hainan Island, China	Decision	5	3:00
Fight was for W.C.K. Muaythai middleweight world title.
2011-01-21	Win	(China) Zhou Zhipeng	Wu Lin Feng	Xi'an, China	Decision	3	3:00
2010-12-05	Loss	(Thailand) Yodsaenklai Fairtex	Kings Cup (Super 8 Tournament)	Bangkok, Thailand	Decision	3	3:00
2010-08-14	Win	(China) Hong Guang	Wu Lin Feng	Henan, China	Decision	3	3:00
2010-05-28	Win	(China) Dong Wenfei	Wu Lin Feng (Final)	Henan, China	Ext.R. decision	4	3:00
Wins 2010 WLF World Championship.
2010-04-03	Win	(China) Zhou Jian Kun	Wu Lin Feng (Semi-final)	Henan, China	Decision	3	3:00
2010-03-29	Win	(China) Yang Zhuo	Wu Lin Feng (Quarter-final)	Henan, China	Decision	3	3:00
2010-02-13	Win	(Thailand) Yodsaenklai Fairtex	Boxe-Thai Guinea Tournament 2	Malabo, Equatorial Guinea	Decision (unanimous)	5	3:00
2010-01-??	Loss	(Italy) Armen Petrosyan	Enfusion Kickboxing Tournament, 1st round	Koh Samui, Thailand	Decision	3	3:00
2010-01-03	Win	(Taiwan) Yang Tong Hsiung	Wu Lin Feng	Henan, China	KO	2	0:20
2009-11-07	Loss	(Thailand) Madsua	I-1 Grand Extreme 2009 - Asian Title (Final)	Macau	Decision (unanimous)	3	3:00
Fight was for I-1 Grand Extreme 2009 - Asian (72kg) 4-man tournament title.
2009-11-07	Win	(Malaysia) Faisal Ramli	I-1 Grand Extreme 2009 - Asian Title (Semi-final)	Macau	Decision (unanimous)	3	3:00
2009-10-22	Loss	(Belarus) Dmitry Valent	I-1 Grand SLAM 4-Man Tournament (Final)	Hong Kong	Decision (split)	3	3:00
Fight was for I-1 Grand SLAM 4-Man Tournament title.
2009-10-22	Win	(France) Abdoul Olay Toure	I-1 Grand SLAM 4-Man Tournament (Semi-final)	Hong Kong	KO	3	3:00
2009-09-20	Win	(China) Du Guangqiang	Wu Lin Feng	Zhengzhou, China	Decision (unanimous)	3	3:00
2009-05-23	Loss	(China) Dong Wenfei	Wu Lin Feng	Zhengzhou, China	Decision (split)	5	2:00
2009-03-26	Loss	(Thailand) Yodsanklai Fairtex	Les Stars du Ring	Levallois-Perret, France	Decision (unanimous)	5	3:00
2009-01-18	Win	(China) Xu Yan	Hero Legend	Beijing, China	Decision (unanimous)	5	3:00
2008-11-25	Loss	(Thailand) Yodsaenklai Fairtex	Planet Battle	Hong Kong	Decision	3	3:00
2008-06-25	Loss	(Thailand) Naruepol Fairtex	Planet Battle	Hong Kong	Decision	3	3:00
2008-03-30	Win	(Thailand) Sinbi Taewoong	The Khan 1	Seoul, South Korea	Ext.R. decision (unanimous)	4	3:00
2007-07-21	Win	(South Korea) Jae Mun Choi	K-1 Fighting Network Khan 2007	Seoul, South Korea	Decision (unanimous)	3	3:00
2006-10-14	Loss	(Croatia) Goran Borovic	K-1 Rules Africa Bomba-Yaa 2006	Johannesburg, South Africa	Decision	5	3:00
Fight was for W.I.P.U. "King of the Ring" oriental rules middleweight world title -72.5 kg.
2006-09-16	Win	(South Korea) Jae-Sik Choi	K-1 Fighting Network KHAN 2006 in Seoul	Seoul, South Korea	KO	1	2:59
2005-05-06	Win	(South Africa) Solly Poo	Corausel	Pretoria, South Africa	KO	1	0:30
2005-02-28	Win	(South Africa) Leon Mynahardt	Fight Extravaganza	Durban, South Africa	KO	3	2:13
2004-11-26	Win	(South Africa) Lucky Notshele	United Fighting Alliance	Johannesburg, South Africa	Decision	5	3:00
2004-02-28	Loss	(Morocco) Behrouz Rastagar	Rising-Sun	Arnhem, Netherlands	Decision	5	3:00
2003-10-11	Win	(South Africa) Moeti Moholo	Rika's Promotions	Pretoria, South Africa	TKO (corner stoppage)	3	3:00
2003-09-14	Loss	(United Kingdom) Neil Woods	Thai Boxing World Championship	Liverpool, United Kingdom	TKO (corner stoppage)	5	3:00
Fight was for W.A.K.O Pro World title.
2003-05-10	Win	(South Africa) Amos Hlatswayo	Challenge of Champs	Johannesburg, South Africa	KO	4	2:30
2002-08-31	Win	(South Africa) Patrick Mahlango	South African Championships	Johannesburg, South Africa	KO	4	2:30
Wins 2002 South African Welter-weight Kick Boxing title.
2002-06-29	Win	(South Africa) Davi Otto	The Jungle War Championship	Johannesburg, South Africa	Decision (unanimous)	5	3:00
Legend: Win Loss Draw/no contest Notes

== Mixed martial arts record ==
Professional record breakdown
13 matches	8 wins	5 losses
By knockout	4	1
By submission	2	1
By decision	2	3

Res.	Record	Opponent	Method	Event	Date	Round	Time	Location	Notes
Win	8–5	Marcelo Tenorio	TKO (punches)	IMPI World Series: Asia 4	20 August 2016	3	2:32	Hong Kong, Hong Kong	
Loss	7–5	Elnur Agaev	TKO (punches)	Kunlun Fight 44	14 May 2016	2	0:40	Khabarovsk, Russia	
Win	7–4	Caros Fodor	Decision (unanimous)	ONE FC: Moment of Truth	6 December 2013	3	5:00	Pasay, Philippines	
Win	6–4	Kotetsu Boku	Decision (unanimous)	ONE FC: Champions and Warriors	13 September 2013	3	5:00	Jakarta, Indonesia	
Loss	5–4	Lowen Tynanes	Submission (rear-naked choke)	ONE FC: Return of Warriors	2 February 2013	3	4:37	Kuala Lumpur, Malaysia	
Loss	5–3	Yui Chul Nam	Decision (split)	Road FC 10: Monson vs Kang	24 November 2012	3	5:00	Busan, South Korea	
Win	5–2	Seok Mo Kim	TKO (knees and punches)	Road FC 9: Beatdown	15 September 2012	1	4:38	Wonju, South Korea	
Loss	4–2	Yui Chul Nam	Decision (unanimous)	Road FC 5: Night of Champions	3 December 2011	3	5:00	Seoul, South Korea	
Win	4–1	Xing Yu Ma	TKO (punches)	ONE FC 1: Champion vs. Champion	3 September 2011	1	0:49	Kallang, Singapore	
Win	3–1	Stefan Lukovnikov	Submission (armbar)	Draka: Governor's Cup 2010	18 December 2010	1	4:59	Khabarovsk, Russia	
Loss	2–1	Eduard Folayang	Decision (unanimous)	Martial Combat 12	16 October 2010	3	5:00	Sentosa, Singapore	
Win	2–0	Alex Niu	KO (punches)	Martial Combat 7	18 August 2010	2	N/A	Sentosa, Singapore	
Win	1–0	John Vargas	Submission (rear-naked choke)	Fury 1: Clash of the Titans	21 May 2010	1	N/A	Cotai, Macau	
