= Sinbi Taewoong =

- Born: Somchai Binmad; September 24, 1979; Natawee, Thailand
- Other names: Sing, Thopadak
- Nationality: Thai
- Height: 1.75 m (5 ft 9 in)
- Weight: 70 kg (154 lb; 11 st)
- Division: Welterweight
- Style: Muay Thai

Kickboxing record
- Total: 239
- Wins: 223
- By knockout: 77
- Losses: 16

Sinbi Taewoong (Thai: ซินบี แตวุง; Korean: 신비 태웅; born September 24, 1979), previously known as Tho. Padak Wanchalerm (Thai: ต.ปฏัก วันเฉลิม; RTGS: To.Patak Wanchaloem), is a Muay Thai fighter from Thailand. He was KOMA champion in 2005 and a highly ranked fighter at Bangkok's Lumpinee and Rajadamnern stadiums.

== Biography ==
Born in Songkhla Province in southern Thailand, Sinbi grew up with two brothers. His father was a rice grower, and his mother worked for a fruit tree farmer. His father started training him and his brothers in Muay Thai at home, when Sinbi was nine years old. He had his first fight at that age. At the age of 13, Sinbi left his home and moved to Bangkok with a friend to live and train in the Loog-tap-agat Gym. While training there, he also went to school, finishing high school at the age of 19. After that he studied sports science in college and graduated at 24. During this time Sinbi trained at the same gym and fought over 100 fights in Bangkok. He fought in the famous and prestigious Lumpinee and Rajadamnern Stadium. At the age of 25, Sinbi went to live and work in Korea for six months as a Muay Thai trainer and he fought for Taewoong Muay Thai Gym in Seoul. He then moved to Phuket, Thailand to work at Rawai Muay Thai, a gym belonging to his friend Tuk, whom he had met while training in Bangkok. Since he was training a large number of foreign Muay Thai students, Sinbi started learning English.

In 2005 Sinbi went to England for one month to fight and to teach Muay Thai in Birmingham, at Trojan Gym. That year, he also won the KOMA event in Korea. In 2006 Sinbi participated in a fight in Sydney, Australia, as well as that year's KOMA event in Seoul, Korea. In 2006 and 2007, he took part in three K-1 sponsored fights in Korea, winning two and losing one. He opened his own Muay Thai facility, Camp Sinbi Muay Thai, in Phuket, Thailand in January 2007.

== See also ==
- List of male kickboxers
- Muay Thai
- K-1
