= Henan Television =

Chinese provincial television broadcaster

Logo of HNTV

Henan Television, (Chinese: 河南电视台) commonly abbreviated as HNTV, a provincial television broadcaster is headquartered in Zhengzhou, capital of Henan province, China.

Because the logo of Henan Television resembles an elephant, viewers refer to it as "Elephant Television", and the official website of Henan Television Channel is called "Elephant Network".

== Foundation ==
Henan Television conducted a trial broadcast on September 10, 1969, and the first program officially began airing on October 1 (national day of China) of the same year, limited to weekly Wednesdays and Saturdays. The station operated on VHF channel 9. On May 15, 1970, the startion started rebroadcasting programs from Beijing Television, even after it was renamed to the current CCTV in 1978. Henan Television launched its second channel on September 15, 1980, where all of the CCTV broadcasts moved there. Color programming did not start until September 1983. During the 80s, Henan Television produced a large number of TV dramas, TV sketches and special cultural programs, some of which even went on to win national television awards.

== Network ==
Now Henan Television (HNTV) has a network of 15 channels (ten for free, five for pay-vision) broadcasting different programmes.
