= Abdallah Mabel =

French-Cameroonian Muay Thai kickboxer

- Born: July 27, 1983 (age 43)
- Other names: La Panthère
- Nationality: French Cameroonian
- Height: 1.75 m (5 ft 9 in)
- Weight: 71.0 kg (156.5 lb; 11.18 st)
- Division: Welterweight
- Style: Muay Thai, Kickboxing
- Fighting out of: Lyon - Saint-Fons, France
- Team: Gym boxing St Fons - Team Nasser K.
- Trainer: Nasser Kacem
- Years active: 11 (1999–present)

Kickboxing record
- Total: 124
- Wins: 90
- By knockout: 47
- Losses: 31
- Draws: 3
- Last updated on: June 14, 2014

Abdallah Mabel (born July 27, 1983) is a French-Cameroonian Muay Thai kickboxer.

== Biography and career ==
=== Biography ===
Mabel resides in Lyon, France and trains at Gym boxing St Fons in Lyon, Saint-Fons. His trainer is Nasser Kacem.

He started Muaythai at the age of 15–16, with Nasser Kacem who was educator in the suburbs of Lyon. A fan of Van Damme and Bruce Lee, he decided out of curiosity to see one of his classes. Shortly after came the era of televised fights with boxers such as Jo Prestia, Dany Bill, Ramon Dekkers and others that made him want to invest in the sport. The success of the K-1 World Max also contributed to his interest.

Being the youngest of his family and seeing that he accumulated successes, his older brothers have totally entrusted to Nasser Kacem. To exercise his passion, Abdallah shares his time between training and working as an educator in his hometown.

=== Early career ===
After 11 years of practice, it counts 102 fights, 86 wins (including 22 by knockout), 18 defeats and 3 draws. Abdallah Mabel fought in Muaythai, in Kickboxing and Full Contact.

In 2005 he was French Muay Thai Champion Class B, WPKC Intercontinental Kick Boxing Champion. In 2007 he became WFC World Muay Thai Champion. In 2009 he won the title of Champion WAKO World Full Contact and TK2 World Max tournament. In 2010 he won the UKC France MAX tournament, reached the finals of the Explosion Fight Night Vol.01 and once again won the tournament TK2 World MAX.

Mabel fought the biggest names in Muay Thai and Kickboxing : Farid Villaume, Kaoponglek, Giorgio Petrosyan, Big Ben, Karim Ghajji, Kem Sitsongpeenong, Saiyok, Naruepol Fairtex.

He faced Super X Por.Petchnamchai at Thai Fight: Lyon on September 19, 2012, in Lyon, France, and won via TKO in the second round.

He defeated Bruce Codron by third-round TKO due to doctor stoppage at Nuit des Champions in Marseilles on November 24, 2012.

Mabel will fight Johann Fauveau at Warriors Night in Levallois, France on March 2, 2013.

He challenged Bernueng TopKingBoxing in a fight for the WMC World Middleweight (-72.5 kg/160 lb) Championship at Monte Carlo Fighting Masters 2014 in Monte Carlo, Monaco on June 14, 2014, losing via TKO due to injury in round three.

== Titles and achievements ==
Professional:

- 2014 A1 WGP Tournament Runner up -70 kg
- 2011 W.P.M.F. World Muaythai Champion -72.500 kg
- 2010 TK2 World Max Tournament Champion -70 kg
- 2010 Explosion Fight Night Volume 01 Tournament Runner Up -71 kg
- 2010 UKC France MAX Tournament Champion -70 kg
- 2009 "Nuit des Champions" Muaythai belt -73 kg
- 2009 TK2 World Max Tournament Champion -70 kg
- 2009 W.A.K.O. Full Contact World Champion -72.600 kg
- 2007 W.F.C. World Muay Thai Champion -72.58 kg
- 2005 W.P.K.C. Intercontinental Kickboxing Champion

Amateur:

- 2005 French Muay Thai Champion Class B -71 kg

== Fight record ==
Kickboxing record
90 Wins (47 (T)KO's), 31 Losses, 3 Draws
Date	Result	Opponent	Event	Location	Method	Round	Time
2018-10-27	Loss	(Switzerland) Yoann Kongolo	Fight Legend Geneva	Geneva, Switzerland	Decision	3	3:00
2018-02-03	Win	(Poland) Pawel Biszczac	DSF Kickboxing Challenge	Poland	Decision	3	3:00
2017-12-16	Win	(Bulgaria) Hristo Hristov	La Nuit Des Challenges 17	France	Decision (Unanimous)	3	3:00
2015-08-22	Loss	(Morocco) Mustapha Haida	VVWS, Final	Debrecen, Hungary	Ext. R. Decision (Majority)	3	3:00
For The Venum Victory World Series -72,5 kg Elimination Tournament Title.
2015-08-22	Win	(Hungary) Norbert Balogh	VVWS, Semi-finals	Debrecen, Hungary	Decision (Unanimous)	3	3:00
2014-11-22	Loss	(Thailand) Sitthichai Sitsongpeenong	La 21ème Nuit des Champions, Semi-finals	Marseille, France	Decision	3	3:00
2014-10-23	Loss	(Belarus) Chingiz Allazov	A1 WCC Lyon, Final	Lyon, France	Decision	3	3:00
Loss A1 WGP Tournament Championship -70 kg.
2014-10-23	Win	(France) Jimmy Vienot	A1 WCC Lyon, Semi-finals	Lyon, France	DQ (Ref. Stop./Three warning)		
2014-06-14	Loss	(Thailand) Berneung Topkingboxing	Monte Carlo Fighting Masters 2014	Monte Carlo, Monaco	TKO (injury)	3	
For the WMC World Middleweight (-72.5 kg/160 lb) Championship.
2014-03-01	Loss	(Belarus) Yuri Bessmertny	Nitrianska Noc Bojovníkov	Nitra, Slovakia	KO	2	
2014-02-08	Win	(Thailand) Rungrawee Kietpatharapan	La Nuit des Titans, final	Tours, France	TKO	2	
Wins La Nuit des Titans 71 kg tournament
2014-02-08	Win	(Belarus) Farhad Akhmedjanov	La Nuit des Titans, semifinal	Tours, France	Decision		
2014-01-25	Loss	(Thailand) Saiyok Pumpanmuang	Ring War	Milan, Italy	TKO (cut)		
2013-12-14	Win	(France) Johann Fauveau	Victory	Paris, France	Decision (Unanimous)		3:00
2013-10-19	Win	(France) Sophien Hassi	THAI MAX	France	TKO	1	
2013-09-21	Win	(United Kingdom) Soloman Wickstead	La Nuit des Challenges 12	Saint-Fons France	TKO	2	
Win the WMC Intercontinental Middleweight (-72.5 kg/160 lb) Championship.
2013-05-31	Loss	(Turkey) Vedat Hödük	A1 World Grand Prix Qualification Tournament, Final	Istanbul, Turkey	Decision	3	3:00
2013-05-31	Win	(Turkey) Mehmet Karaburk	A1 World Grand Prix Qualification Tournament, Semifinals	Istanbul, Turkey	Decision	3	3:00
2013-03-02	Loss	(France) Djimé Coulibaly	Warriors Night	Levallois, France	Decision (Unanimous)		3:00
2012-11-24	Win	(France) Bruce Codron	Nuit des Champions	Marseilles, France	TKO (doctor stoppage)	3	
2012-09-19	Win	(Thailand) Super X Por.Petchnamchai	THAI FIGHT Extreme 2012: France	Lyon, France	TKO (referee stoppage)	2	
2012-08-17	Loss	(Thailand) Armin Pumpanmuang Windy Sport	THAI FIGHT Extreme 2012: England	Leicester, England	TKO (Referee Stoppage)	2	
2012-06-02	Win	(Thailand) Palangnum Laemthonggarnpaet	La Nuit des Challenges 11	Lyon, France	TKO (Referee Stoppage)	3	
2011-12-17	Loss	(Thailand) Sudsakorn Sor Klinmee	Fight Code - Dragon Series, Semi-final	Debrecen, Hungary	Decision (Unanimous)	3	3:00
2011-11-26	Win	(China) Xu Yan	Fight Code - Rhinos Series, Quarter-finals	Geneva, Switzerland	Decision (Unanimous)	3	3:00
2011-11-12	Win	(France) Gregory Choplin	La 18ème Nuit des Champions	Marseille, France	Decision	5	3:00
Wins W.P.M.F. World Muaythai title -72.500 kg.
2011-10-15	Win	(China) Xu Yan	Fight Code - Dragon Series, Quarter-finals	Marseilles, France	Decision	3	3:00
2011-09-25	Loss	(Thailand) Buakaw Por. Pramuk	Thai Fight 2011 70 kg Tournament, Quarter-final	Bangkok, Thailand	Decision	3	3:00
2011-06-04	Win	(Thailand) Chanachai Kaewsamrit	La Nuit des Challenges 10	Lyon, Saint-Fons, France	Decision	5	3:00
2011-05-14	Loss	(Thailand) Sudsakorn Sor Klinmee	THAI FIGHT Extreme 2011: France	Cannes, France	Decision	3	3:00
2011-01-29	Win	(Russia) Vladimir Shulyak	Fight Code - Dragon Series, Final 16	Torino, Italy	TKO	3	
2010-12-18	Win	(Thailand) Naruepol Fairtex	La Nuit des Challenges 9	Lyon, France	TKO (Elbow/Cut)	3	
2010-11-26	Loss	(Thailand) Kem Sitsongpeenong	La Nuit des Champions 2010	Marseilles, France	Decision	5	3:00
Fight was for "Nuit des Champions" Muaythai belt -70 kg.
2010-10-29	Loss	(Thailand) Saiyok Pumpanmuang	France vs Lumpinee	Paris, France	Decision	5	3:00
Fight was for Lumpinee Super Welterweight title.
2010-10-09	Win	(France) Philippe Salmon	TK2 World MAX 2010, Final	Aix-en-Provence, France	KO	1	
Wins TK2 World MAX tournament -70 kg.
2010-10-09	Win	(Romania) Mihai Barbu	TK2 World MAX 2010, Semi-final	Aix-en-Provence, France	Decision	3	3:00
2010-10-09	Win	(Netherlands) Jordy Van Der Sluijs	TK2 World MAX 2010, Quarter-final	Aix-en-Provence, France	TKO (Doctor Stoppage)	2	
2010-06-19	Loss	(Thailand) Kem Sitsongpeenong	Explosion Fight Night Volume 01, Final	Brest, France	Decision	4	3:00
Fight was for K-1 Explosion Max Tournament (71kg).
2010-06-19	Win	(Belgium) Morad Salhi	Explosion Fight Night Volume 01, Semi-final	Brest, France	Decision	3	3:00
2010-06-05	Win	(Morocco) Walid Haddad	La Nuit des Challenges 8	Lyon, Saint-Fons, France	TKO	1	
2010-02-06	Win	(France) Karim Ghajji	UKC France MAX, Final	Dijon, France	KO (Right flying knee)	2	
Wins UKC France MAX tournament -70 kg.
2010-02-06	Win	(France) Mickael Lallemand	UKC France MAX, Semi-final	Dijon, France	KO	1	
2010-02-06	Win	(Turkey) Ali Alkayis	UKC France MAX, Quarter-final	Dijon, France	TKO	3	
2009-11-28	Loss	(Thailand) Big Ben Chor Praram 6	A-1 World Cup Combat Lyon	Lyon, France	KO	1	
Fight was for W.B.C. Muay Thai World title.
2009-11-14	Win	(France) Farid Villaume	La Nuit des Champions 2009	Marseille, France	Decision	5	3:00
Wins "Nuit des Champions" Muaythai belt -73 kg.
2009-10-09	Win	(France) Jeremy Sportouch	TK2 World MAX 2009, Final	Aix-en-Provence, France	TKO	1	
Wins TK2 World MAX tournament -70 kg.
2009-10-09	Win	(France) Philippe Salmon	TK2 World MAX 2009, Semi-final	Aix-en-Provence, France	KO	2	
2009-10-09	Win	(Hungary) Andy Toth Arpad Gabor	TK2 World MAX 2009, Quarter-final	Aix-en-Provence, France	KO	1	
2009-06-26	Loss	(Thailand) Thanondet Artwichian	Gala International Multi-Boxes	Paris, France	Decision	5	3:00
2009-05-16	Win	(Albania) Tahir Menxhiqi	Légendes et Guerriers	Toulouse, France	Decision	5	2:00
2009-05-30	Loss	(France) Lionel Picord	Le Choc des Gladiateurs	Clichy, France	Disqualification	8	
Loses W.A.K.O. Full Contact World title -76.2 kg.
2009-02-21	Win	(France) Eric Schmitt	Finale mondiale WAKO Pro	Aix-en-Provence, France	Decision	12	2
Wins Schmitt's W.A.K.O. Full Contact World title -76.2 kg.
2008-12-19	Loss	(Belarus) Dmitry Valent	Contender Asia Qualifier, Quarter-final	Chelyabinsk, Russia	Decision	3	3:00
2008-10-11	Loss	(Poland) Michał Głogowski	TK2 World MAX 2008, Quarter-final	Aix-en-Provence, France	Decision	3	3:00
2008-09-20	Loss	(Armenia) Harut Grigorian	S-Cup Europe 2008, Reserve Fight	Gorinchem, Netherlands	Decision	3	3:00
2008-07-06	Draw	(Italy) Fabio Siciliani	The Warrior's Fighting IX	Italy	Decision draw	5	3:00
2008-06-12	Loss	(France) Jonathan Camara	Gala de Levallois	Levallois, France	Decision (Unanimous)	5	3:00
2008-06-07	Win	(Morocco) Walid Haddad	La Nuit des Challenges 5	Lyon, Saint-Fons, France	Decision (Unanimous)	5	3:00
2008-05-09	Win	(Lithuania) Ernestas Dapkus	Battle of Champions 4-men tournament	Chelyabinsk, Russia	KO	1	
2008-01-26	Win	(France) Tarik Benfkih	La Nuit des Titans III	Tours, France	KO	1	
2008-00-00	Win	(Italy) Masigliano Girardi	Full Contact match	France	TKO (Gave up)	1	
2007-11-24	Loss	(Italy) Giorgio Petrosyan	Janus Fight Night 2007, Semi-final	Padua, Italy	Decision (Unanimous)	3	3:00
2007-11-24	Win	(Assyrian homeland) Fadi Merza	Janus Fight Night 2007, Quarter-final	Padua, Italy	TKO	2	
2007-11-17	Draw	(France) Sofiane Allouache	La Nuit des Champions 2007	Marseille, France	Decision draw	3	3:00
2007-10-12	Loss	(Turkey) Gürkan Özkan	A-1 Combat World Cup	Istanbul, Turkey	TKO	1	
2007-09-24	Loss	(Belarus) Yuri Bulat	Kings of Muaythai : Belarus vs Europe	Minsk, Belarus	Decision (Split)	5	3:00
Fight was for World Kickboxing Network Thai Boxing World title -72.600 kg.
2007-07-27	Loss	(Italy) Giorgio Petrosyan	Serata Muaythai Gala	Trieste, Italy	TKO	5	
2007-07-20	Win	(Poland) Piotr Woźnicki	A-1 Cyprus	Cyprus	TKO	2	
2007-07-20	Win	(Turkey) Kara Murat	A-1 Cyprus	Cyprus	Decision	3	
2007-06-09	Win	(France) Arnold Gond	La Nuit des Challenges 4	Lyon, Saint-Fons, France	Decision (Unanimous)	5	3:00
2007-05-26	Loss	(Italy) Giorgio Petrosyan	Muay Thai Event in Padua	Padua, Italy	Decision (Unanimous)	3	3:00
2007-05-12	Loss	(Russia) Ibragim Tamazaev	Kickboxing Superstar XVII	Milan, Italy	TKO	4	
2007-04-07	Loss	(France) Djimé Coulibaly	La Nuit des Supers Fights VII, Semi-final	Villebon, France	Decision	5	3:00
2007-04-07	Win	(France) Morad Bourachid	La Nuit des Supers Fights VII, Quarter-final	Villebon, France	Decision	5	3:00
2007-03-17	Win	(Switzerland) Rudaj Züber	La Notte dei Guerrieri	San Giovanni Rotondo, Italy	TKO	4	
Wins W.F.C. Muay Thai World title -72.58 kg.
2007-02-24	Win	(Poland) Bartosz Koscielniak	Jesolo Fight Night 2007	Jesolo, Italy	Decision	5	3:00
2007-02-17	Win	(Thailand) Sakmongkol Sithchuchok	La Nuit des Titans II	Tours, France	Decision	5	3:00
2007-00-00	Win	(Italy) Fabrizio Mazzuri	Kickboxing Match	Italy	KO	2	
2006-12-17	Win	(Turkey) Gürkan Özkan	A-1 Combat World Cup	Turkey	TKO	2	
2006-12-09	Win	(Switzerland) Rudaj Züber	Muay Thai in Action	Zürich, Switzerland	Decision	5	3:00
2006-12-02	Win	(Austria) Foad Sadeghi	Lugano Grand Prix 4	Lugano, Switzerland	Decision (Unanimous)	3	3:00
2006-10-21	Loss	(France) Farid Villaume	A-1 World Combat Cup, Semi-final	Istanbul, Turkey	KO	2	
2006-10-15	Win	(Turkey) Senol Kiziltas	A-1 World Combat Cup	Istanbul, Turkey	KO	1	
2006-09-21	Loss	(Albania) Valon Basha	A-1 Final 8 Ankara	Ankara, Turkey	KO	1	
2006-09-09	Win	(Tunisia) Sahran Benmohammed	A-1 Antalya	Antalya, Turkey	Decision	3	3:00
2006-06-03	Win	(Thailand) Sak Kaoponlek	La Nuit des Challenges 3	Lyon, Saint-Fons, France	KO	3	
2006-04-22	Win	(France) Moussa Konaté	Nuit du Muay Thaï et des Arts Martiaux	Pau, France	Decision	5	3:00
2005-06-10	NC	(Italy) Matteo Sciacca	Muay Thai a Fiume Veneto	Italy	No Contest	1	2:11
2005-04-30	Draw	(France) Samir Berbachi	Post Tenebra Cup 2005	Geneva, Switzerland	Decision draw	3	3:00
2005-05-14	Win	(France) Kamel Gillet	French Championship 2005 Class B, Final	Paris, France	KO	3	
Wins French Muay Thai Championship 2005 Class B title -71 kg.
2005-03-26	Win	(France) Ibrahim Karaboue	French Championship 2005 Class B, Semi-final	Paris, France	KO	3	
Legend: Win Loss Draw/No contest Notes

== See also ==
- List of male kickboxers
