= Mickaël Piscitello =

French kickboxer (born 1983)

- Born: December 17, 1983 (age 42)
- Nationality: (France) French (Italy) Italian
- Height: 1.82 m (5 ft 11 1/2 in)
- Weight: 70.0 kg (154.3 lb; 11.02 st)
- Division: Middleweight
- Style: Muay Thai
- Fighting out of: Lyon - Saint-Fons, France
- Team: Gym boxing St Fons - Team Nasser K.
- Trainer: Nasser Kacem
- Years active: 10 (2001–present)

Kickboxing record
- Total: 65
- Wins: 41
- By knockout: 23
- Losses: 23
- Draws: 1
- Last updated on: June 22, 2013

Mickaël Piscitello (born December 17, 1983), is a French-Italian Muay Thai kickboxer, famous for his technical fighting style and his elbows. He is the former W.P.M.F. World Muaythai Champion.

== Biography and career ==
=== Biography ===
Mickael Piscitello was born on December 17, 1983. Piscitello resides in Lyon, France and trains at Gym boxing St Fons in Lyon, Saint-Fons. His trainer is Nasser Kacem.

=== Early career ===
He begins Muaythai at the age of 17, with Nasser Kacem who was educator in the suburbs of Lyon. In 2010 he became W.P.M.F. World Muaythai Champion.

He faced Sudsakorn Sor Klinmee at Thai Fight: Lyon on September 19, 2012, in Lyon, France, and won via TKO due to a cut in the second round.

He then defeated Yazid Boussaha by the same manner at the A1 World Combat Cup on November 20, 2012.

A rematch between Sudsakorn and Piscitello took place at Yokkao Extreme 2013 in Milan, Italy, on January 26, 2013, Sudsakorn coming out the victor this time by way of decision.

He was floored by Kem Sitsongpeenong with elbows numerous times en route to losing a unanimous decision win at Best of Siam 3 in Paris, France, on February 14, 2013.

He was knocked out by Saiyok Pumpanmuang in round two at Thai Fight: Bangkok 2013 in Bangkok, Thailand on June 29, 2013.

It was reported that he would fight Saenchai PKSaenchaimuaythaigym at the WBC World Muay Thai Millennium Championship in Saint-Pierre, Réunion on September 7, 2013. However, Saenchai denied ever being on the card.

== Titles and achievements ==
- 2012 La Nuit des Titans Muaythai Tournament Finalist (-72 kg)
- 2011 KONATEAM Tournament Champion
- 2010 W.P.M.F. World Muaythai Champion (-70 kg)
- 2009 A1 WCC Melbourne World Middleweight Tournament Champion
- 2007 W.B.C. Muay Thai United States Super Welterweight Champion
- 2006 French Muaythai Class B Champion (-71 kg)

== Kickboxing record ==
Kickboxing record
41 Wins (23 (T)KO's), 23 Losses, 1 Draw
Date	Result	Opponent	Event	Location	Method	Round	Time
2014-11-29	Loss	(Switzerland) Christopher Pruvost	Strike Fight	Lyon, France	TKO	2	
2014-11-29	Win	(France) Thomas Nguyen	International Sanda Pro Fight Championship	Lyon, France	Decision (unanimous)	3	
2014-10-11	Loss	(England) Jordan Watson	Yokkao 10	Bolton, England	TKO (leg injury)	3	1:18
2013-09-07	Loss	(Thailand) Sitthichai Sitsongpeenong	Millenium Team Fight	La Réunion, France	KO (elbow)	2	
2013-06-29	Loss	(Thailand) Saiyok Pumpanmuang	Thai Fight: Bangkok 2013	Bangkok, Thailand	KO (left elbow)	2	
2013-02-14	Loss	(Thailand) Kem Sitsongpeenong	Best of Siam 3	Paris, France	Decision (unanimous)	5	3:00
2013-01-26	Loss	(Thailand) Sudsakorn Sor Klinmee	Yokkao Extreme 2013	Milan, Italy	Decision (unanimous)	3	3:00
2012-11-20	Win	(France) Yazid Boussaha	A1 World Combat Cup	France	TKO (cut)	4	
2012-09-19	Win	(Thailand) Sudsakorn Sor Klinmee	Thai Fight: Lyon	Lyon, France	TKO (cut)	2	
2012-03-17	Loss	(Thailand) Super X Por.Petchnamchai	La Nuit des Titans Tournament, Final	France	KO (Knee to the liver)	1	
Fight was for La Nuit des Titans -72 kg Muaythai Tournament.
2012-03-17	Win	(Cambodia) Bird Kham	La Nuit des Titans Tournament, Semi Final	France	Decision	3	3:00
2011-11-27	Loss	(Thailand) Buakaw Por. Pramuk	Thai Fight 2011 70 kg Tournament, Semi Final	Bangkok, Thailand	KO (Right Elbow)	3	
2011-09-25	Win	(Morocco) Hafid El Boustati	Thai Fight 2011 70 kg Tournament, Quarter Final	Bangkok, Thailand	Decision	3	3:00
2011-05-14	Loss	(France) Johann Fauveau	It's Showtime 2011 Lyon	Lyon, France	TKO (Doctor Stoppage)	5	
2011-04-23	Win	(France) Mohamed Houmer	Tournoi Konateam Cup, Final	Villiers-sur-Marne, France	TKO	2	
Wins Konateam Tournament title.
2011-04-23	Win	(France) Mickael Cornubet	Tournoi Konateam Cup, Semi Final	Villiers-sur-Marne, France	KO	3	
2010-11-29	Loss	(Thailand) Chanachai Kaewsamrit	Rajadamnern Stadium	Bangkok, Thailand	Decision	5	3:00
Fight was for Vacant Rajadamnern Stadium title -70 kg.
2010-10-15	Win	(Thailand) Thanongdet Chengsimiewgym	Maxi Fight 2	Stade de l'Est, Réunion	Decision	5	3:00
Wins W.P.M.F. World Muaythai title -70 kg.
2009-11-28	Loss	(France) Johann Fauveau	A1 Lyon	Lyon, France	Decision	5	3:00
2009-11-00	Win	(Australia) Baris Nezif	A1 WCC Melbourne, Final	Melbourne, Australia	KO (Knee)	1	
Wins A1 WCC Melbourne World Middleweight Tournament title.
2009-11-00	Win	(France) Willy Borrel	A1 WCC Melbourne, Semi Final	Melbourne, Australia	TKO	2	
2009-11-00	Win	(Turkey) Erkan Yldiz	A1 WCC Melbourne, Quarter Final	Melbourne, Australia	Decision	3	3:00
2009-08-00	Loss	(England) Luther Kris	Province Stadium	Thailand	Decision	5	3:00
2009-05-09	Loss	(Thailand) Bovy Sor Udomson	Thai Tournament III	Geneva, Switzerland	TKO (Referee Stoppage)	4	
2009-01-26	Loss	(France) Paolo Iry	Diamond Fight World Tour	Paris, France	Decision	5	2:00
2009-00-00	Win	(Italy) Sharos Huyer	Muaythai Gala	Italy	Decision	5	3:00
2008-12-19	Loss	(Belarus) Vitaly Gurkov	The Contender Asia S.02 Russia Qualifier, Quarter Final	Chelyabinsk, Russia	Decision	3	3:00
2008-10-25	Win	(France) Hichem Chaïbi	Le Choc des Best Fighters 1	Asnières-sur-Seine, France	TKO (Elbow)	1	
2008-09-21	Loss	(Thailand) Kanongsuk Sit Jarpirt	Rajadamnern Stadium	Bangkok, Thailand	Decision	5	3:00
2008-06-07	Win	(Italy) Nabil Midani	La Nuit des Challenges 5	Lyon, Saint-Fons, France	TKO (Doctor Stoppage)	1	
2008-04-26	Loss	(France) Mickael Lallemand	Gala de Pau	Pau, France	Decision	5	3:00
Fight was for French Muaythai Championships Class A title -72 kg.
2008-03-02	Win	(Italy) Frederico Vella	Fighting Day 8	Milan, Italy	Decision	5	3:00
2007-11-17	Loss	(France) Farid Khider	La Nuit des Champions	Marseilles, France	Decision	5	3:00
2007-09-08	Win	(Canada) Baxter Humby	WBC Muay Thai Presents: World Championship Muay Thai	Gardena, CA	TKO (Referee Stoppage)	3	
Wins W.B.C. Muay Thai United States Super Welterweight title.
2007-07-20	Loss	(Turkey) Erkan Varol	A1 Kickbox	Turkey	Decision	3	3:00
2007-06-09	Loss	(Thailand) Sak Kaoponlek	La Nuit des Challenges 4	Lyon, Saint-Fons, France	TKO (Referee Stoppage)	2	
2007-04-07	Loss	(France) Nordine Amari	La Nuit des Superfights, Quarter Final	Villebon, France	Decision	3	3:00
2007-02-24	Draw	(Italy) Dipo Carlo Dipaola	Gala in Jesolo	Jesolo, Italy	Decision draw	3	3:00
2007-02-17	Win	(Germany) Omar Siala	Gala de Massy	Massy, France	TKO (Doctor Stoppage)	1	
2006-12-16	Loss	(France) Gafary Boussari	French Champ. Class A, Final 8	Paris, France	Decision	5	3:00
2006-06-03	Win	(Italy) Calozarie]	La Nuit des Challenges 3	Lyon, Saint-Fons	KO	3	
2006-04-26	Win	(France) Kamel Gillet	French Champ. Class B, Final	Paris, France	Forfeit		
Wins French Muaythai Championships Class B title -71 kg.
2006-03-25	Win	(France) Kader Bouamama	French Champ. Class B, Semi Final	Paris, France			
2005-12-17	Win	(France) Mickael Cornubet	French Champ. Class B, Quarter Final	Paris, France	Decision (Unanimous)	4	3:00
2005-01-15	Win	(France) Ridouane Bencherif]	French Champ. Class B	Paris, France	TKO (Doctor Stoppage)	1	
Legend: Win Loss Draw/No contest Notes

== See also ==
- List of male kickboxers
