= Johann Fauveau =

French Muay Thai kickboxer

- Born: March 15, 1982 (age 44); Asnières, France
- Other names: Young Perez, Fauveausky
- Nationality: French
- Height: 1.78 m (5 ft 10 in)
- Weight: 70.0 kg (154.3 lb; 11.02 st)
- Division: Super Welterweight
- Style: Boxing, Muay Thai
- Team: Team Mezaache
- Trainer: Franck Mezaache
- Years active: 10 (2000–present)

Professional boxing record
- Total: 4
- Wins: 3
- By knockout: 2
- Draws: 1

Kickboxing record
- Total: 34
- Wins: 27
- By knockout: 16
- Losses: 6
- Draws: 1

Other information
- Boxing record from BoxRec
- Last updated on: June 14, 2014

Johann Fauveau (born March 15, 1982) is a French Muay Thai kickboxer. He is a three time French Muaythai Champion. In May 2012, he became World Champion ISKA of Kickboxing K1.

== Early life ==
Fauveau is Jewish. His nickname "Young Perez" is reference to Victor Perez, a Jewish French Tunisian World Champion boxer, killed in the Holocaust. Fauveau's grandfather, who was friend with Perez and a boxing fan, got him into martial arts at an early age. He began training in karate initially before switching to boxing and Muay Thai.

== Biography and career ==
=== Biography ===
was born in 1982 in Asnières.

=== Early career ===
Fauveau is a three-time French Muaythai Champion. He has had 25 fights for 22 wins (including 15 by knockout), two defeats and one draw in Muaythai. He also fought in boxing, four fights for three wins (including two by knockout) and one draw.

In May 2012, he faced the English kickboxer Jordan Watson for the World title ISKA Kickboxing K1 Welterweight (- 70 kg). He won and became World Champion of Kickboxing K1 ISKA.

In January 2013, he faced the French kickboxer Ludovic Millet at the ISKA World Super Welterweight (-72.3 kg/159.4 lb) Oriental Championship in Meaux, France, losing on points.

He was set to go up against Warren Stevelmans at Glory 5: London on March 23, 2013, in London, England. However, when Andy Ristie was unable to fight in the event's co-main event against Albert Kraus, Stevelmans took his place and Costel Pașniciuc was drafted in as Fauveau's new opponent on one day's notice. Fauveau won by unanimous decision.

After this, he had a difficult development of his career. He was stopped with low kicks in round three by Hinata at Glory 10: Los Angeles - Middleweight World Championship Tournament in Ontario, California, United States on September 28, 2013.

He was knocked out by Sitthichai Sitsongpeenong in round two at Best of Siam 5 in Paris, France, on June 14, 2014.

He came back after two years of break, with a new style of boxing with more footwork, much more dynamic, unpredictable and fluid. He won against Michael Françoise for the Triumph Fighting Tour.

== Titles and achievements ==
- 2012 ISKA World K-1 Rules Super Welterweight Champion (70 kg)
- 2006 French Muaythai Class A Champion (69.800 kg)
- 2005 French Muaythai Class A Champion
- 2004 French Muaythai Class A Champion

== Kickboxing record ==
Kickboxing record
27 wins (16 (T)KOs), 6 losses, 1 draw
Date	Result	Opponent	Event	Location	Method	Round	Time
2017-06-23	Win	(France) Michael Françoise	Triumph Fighting Tour	Paris, France	Decision (unanimous)	3	3:00
2014-06-14	Loss	(Thailand) Sitthichai Sitsongpeenong	Best of Siam 5	Paris, France	KO	2	
2013-12-14	Loss	(France) Abdallah Mabel	Victory	Paris, France	Decision (unanimous)	3	3:00
2013-09-28	Loss	(Japan) Hinata Watanabe	Glory 10: Los Angeles	Ontario, California, USA	TKO (low kicks)	3	0:48
2013-03-23	Win	(Romania) Costel Pașniciuc	Glory 5: London	London, England	Decision (unanimous)	3	3:00
2013-01-19	Loss	(France) Ludovic Millet		Meaux, France	Decision	5	3:00
For the ISKA World Super Welterweight (-69.5kg/153.2lb) Oriental Championship.
2012-05-19	Win	(England) Jordan Watson	Urban Boxing United	Marseilles, France	Decision	5	3:00
Wins K1 ISKA World title (70 kg).
2012-04-07	Win	(France) Yazid Boussaha	Explosion Fight Night Volume 5	Châteauroux, France	Decision	3	3:00
2011-11-19	Win	(France) Fares Bechar	Time Fight	Tours, France	Decision	3	3:00
2011-10-01	Win	(Turkey) Aydin Tuncay	F-1 World MAX 2011	Meyreuil, France	TKO (referee stoppage)	3	
2011-05-14	Win	(France) Mickael Piscitello	It's Showtime 2011 Lyon	Lyon, France	TKO (doctor stoppage)	5	
2009-11-28	Win	(France) Mickael Piscitello	A1 Lyon	Lyon, France	Decision	5	3:00
2009-06-20	Loss	(France) Farid Villaume	Gala de Levallois	Levallois-Perret, France	Decision	5	3:00
2008-11-06	Win	(France) Willy Borrel	Gala de Levallois	Levallois, France	Decision	5	3:00
2008-06-12	Win	(Thailand) Kapapeth	Gala de Levallois	Levallois, France	Decision	5	3:00
2008-04-26	Draw	(France) Djime Coulibaly	Gala in Saint-Denis	Saint-Denis, France	Decision draw	5	3:00
2007-11-29	Loss	(France) Willy Borrel	France vs Thailand	Coubertin-Paris, France	Decision	5	3:00
2007-06-16	Win	(France) Rachid Kabbouri	La Nuit des Super Fights VIII	Paris-Bercy, France	Decision	5	3:00
2007-04-21	Win	(France) Steeve Valente	Gala de Levallois-Perret	Levallois, France	TKO (gave up)	2	
2006-11-18	Win	(France) Djime Coulibaly	Gala in Levallois	Levallois, France	Decision	5	2:00
2006-11-04	Win	(France) Tavares	French Championships 2006, Final	Saint-Denis, France	TKO (referee stoppage)		
Wins French Muay Thai Championships 2006 Class A title (69.800 kg).
2006-07-01	Win	(France)	French Championships 2006, Semi Final	Saint-Denis, France	KO	3	
2006-02-04	Win	(France) Mourad Bourrachid	Gala in Nantes	Nantes, France	KO	4	
2004-05-29	Win	(France) Samuel Botereau	Gala in Asnières	Asnières, France	KO	3	
2004-03-27	Win	(France) Rédouane	French Championships 2004, Semi Final	Val-de-Reuil, France	Decision	4	3:00

Boxing record
3 wins (2 (T)KOs), 1 draw
Date	Result	Opponent	Event	Location	Method	Round	Time	Record
2011-01-22	Win	(Bulgaria) Zahari Mutafchiev	Palais des sports Marcel Cerdan	Levallois-Perret, France	Decision (unanimous)	6		3–0-1
2010-11-20	Draw	(France) Youssouf Doumbia	Palais des sports Marcel Cerdan	Levallois-Perret, France	Decision draw	6		2–0-1
2010-06-25	Win	(France) Fatah Hou	Palais des sports Marcel Cerdan	Levallois-Perret, France	TKO	4		2–0-0
2010-04-09	Win	(France) Rudy Sibilo	Challenge Marcel Cerdan	Levallois-Perret, France	KO	3		1–0-0
Legend: Win Loss Draw/no contest Notes

== See also ==
- List of male kickboxers
