= Ludovic Millet =

French martial artist

- Born: September 1, 1985 (age 41)
- Nationality: (France) French
- Height: 1.82 m (5 ft 11 1/2 in)
- Weight: 70.0 kg (154.3 lb; 11.02 st)
- Division: Super Welterweight
- Style: Savate, Kickboxing, Full Contact
- Fighting out of: Meaux, France
- Team: CS Meaux AP
- Trainer: Abderaman Hamouri
- Years active: (1996 - present)

Kickboxing record
- Total: 116
- Wins: 94
- By knockout: 30
- Losses: 21
- Draws: 1
- Last updated on: April 12, 2013

Ludovic Millet (born September 1, 1985) is a French Savate kickboxer, famous for his boxing skills. He is French Champion in Savate and kickboxing and he is the World Kickboxing Network (W.K.N.) World Full Contact Champion.

== Biography and career ==
=== Biography ===
Ludovic Millet, 25 years old, is French Savate and Kickboxing Elite Champion and the W.K.N. World Full Contact Champion.

Millet resides in Meaux, France, and trains at CS Meaux AP. His trainer is Abderaman Hamouri. He shares his time between training and working as an educator/sports instructor in his hometown. In 2011 he won two important French tournaments in K-1 Rules.

He challenged Yasuhiro Kido for his Krush -70 kg title at Krush.23 on October 8, 2012 in Tokyo, and lost via unanimous decision (30-26, 30-26, 30-26).

He defended his ISKA World Super Welterweight (-69.5 kg/153.2 lb) Oriental Championship against Johann Fauveau in Meaux, France, on January 19, 2013, winning on points.

He lost to Philippe Salmon on points at FK-ONE in Paris, France, on April 20, 2013.

== Titles and achievements ==
Professional

- 2012 K1 ISKA World Champion (70 kg)
- 2011 Explosion Fight Night Volume 04 Tournament Champion (71 kg)
- 2011 Young Guns 2 Tournament Champion (71 kg)
- 2010 W.K.N. World Full Contact Champion (72.600 kg)
- 2009 Savate World Champion (70 kg)
- 2009 French Savate Elite Champion
- 2008 K1 Survivor Tournament Runner Up
- 2008 Savate European Champion
- 2008 French Savate Elite Champion
- 2006 French Kickboxing Class A Champion

Amateur

- 2006 W.A.K.O. European Championships in Skopje, Macedonia (bronze) -71 kg (Low-Kick)

== Kickboxing record ==
Kickboxing record
94 Wins (30 (T)KO's), 21 Losses, 1 Draw
Date	Result	Opponent	Event	Location	Method	Round	Time
2017-11-11	Loss	(Morocco) Aziz Kallah	Enfusion Live 55 Final 16	Amsterdam	TKO	3	
2017-10-19	Loss	(Russia) Vlad Tuinov	Partouche Kickboxing Tour -72 kg Tournament Semi Finals	France	KO (Punches)	1	2:27
2013-04-20	Loss	(France) Philippe Salmon	FK-ONE	Paris, France	Decision	3	3:00
2013-01-19	Win	(France) Johann Fauveau		Meaux, France	Decision	5	3:00
Defends the ISKA World Super Welterweight (-69.5kg/153.2lb) Oriental Championship.
2012-12	Win	(France) Kevin Suzanne	La Nuit Du Kickboxing	Saint-Jean-de-Braye, France	KO	2	
2012-10-08	Loss	(Japan) Yasuhiro Kido	Krush.23	Tokyo, Japan	Decision (unanimous)	3	3:00
2012-04-28	Loss	(France) Bakari Tounkara	Gala international de boxe thaï & K1 rules	Bagnolet, France	TKO (Doctor Stoppage)	3	
2012-01-21	Win	(England) Tim Thomas	Championnat du Monde ISKA	Meaux, France	Decision	5	3:00
Wins K1 ISKA World title (70 kg).
2011-12-07	Win	(France) Frederic Berichon	A-1 World Combat Cup	Lyon, France	Decision		
2011-11-12	Loss	(France) Bruce Codron	La 18ème Nuit des Champions	Marseille, France	Decision	7	2:00
Fight was for "Nuit des Champions" Full Contact belt -70 kg.
2011-06-04	Win	(France) Aziz Ali-Kada	Explosion Fight Night Volume 04 Tournament, Final	Saint-Fons, France	Decision (Majority)	3	3:00
Wins Explosion Fight Night Volume 04 Tournament title (71 kg).
2011-06-04	Win	(France) Hichem Chaïbi	Explosion Fight Night Volume 04 Tournament, Semi Final	Saint-Fons, France	Decision (Majority)	3	3:00
2011-04-30	Loss	(France) Moussa Konaté	8 Men 73 kg Tournament, Semi Final	Bagnolet, France	KO	2	
2011-04-30	Win	(Cambodia) Sen Bunthen	8 Men 73 kg Tournament, Quarter Final	Bagnolet, France	Decision	3	3:00
2011-04-08	Win	(France) Anthony Frémont	Savate Boxing 7	Marseilles, France	KO (Liver Shot)	4	
2011-03-12	Win	(Russia) Maxim Shalnev	8ème Nuit des Champions - Full Contact	Dinard, France	Decision		
2011-02-26	Win	(France) Ahmed Hassan	Young Guns 2 Tournament, Final	Houplines, France	Decision (Unanimous)	3	3:00
Wins Young Guns 2 Tournament title (71 kg).
2011-02-26	Win	(Belgium) Hamza Rahmani	Young Guns 2 Tournament, Semi Final	Houplines, France	Decision	3	3:00
2010-12-11	Win	(France) Eric Schmitt	Full Night 4	Agde, France	TKO (Referee Stoppage)	9	
Wins W.K.N. World Full Contact title (72.600 kg).
2010-10-09	Win	(France) Jeremy Sportouch	TK2 World Max 2010	Aix-en-Provence, France	Decision	3	3:00
2010-06-19	Loss	(Thailand) Kem Sitsongpeenong	Explosion Fight Night Volume 01, Semi Final	Brest, France	Decision (Unanimous)	3	3:00
2010–06-04	Loss	(Croatia) Frane Radnić	Nitrianska Noc Bojovnikov - Ring of Honor	Nitra, Slovakia	TKO	2	
2010-05-08	Win	(France) Eddy Blaise	Seine et Marne vs Paca	Nanteuil-lès-Meaux, France			
2010-04-24	Win	(Luxembourg) Kévin Hass	La Nuit des Titans	Saint-André-les-Vergers, France	Decision	5	2:00
2010-03-13	Loss	(France) Cédric Flament	7ème Trophée de l’Ephèbe	Bagnolet, France	Decision	5	3:00
2010-02-06	Win	(Belgium) Thierry Lallemand	UKC France MAX 2010	Dijon, France	KO	1	
2009-12-12	Win	(Italy) Roberto Beta	Savate World Championship	La Motte-Servolex, France	Decision		
Wins Savate World title (70 kg).
2009-05-23	Win	(France) Georgy Fernante	French Savate Championships, Final	Paris, France	Decision (Majority)		
Wins French Savate Championships title.
2009-01-31	Win	(France) Sadio Sissoko	La Nuit des Titans 2009	Tours, France	Decision	5	3:00
2008-12-20	Loss	(France) Jonathan Camara	K1 Survivor Tournament, Final	Paris, France	KO	1	
Fight was for K1 Survivor Tournament title.
2008-12-20	Win	(France) Carlos Tavares	K1 Survivor Tournament, Semi Final	Paris, France	Decision	3	3:00
2008-12-20	Win	(France) Richard Antoine	K1 Survivor Tournament, Quarter Final	Paris, France	Decision (Unanimous)	3	3:00
2008-11-07	Win	(Serbia) Pedrag Darijevic	Savate European Championship	Meaux, France	KO	3	
Wins Savate European title.
2008-05-17	Win	(France) Georgy Fernante	French Savate Championships, Final	Mulhouse, France	Decision (Unanimous)		
Wins French Savate Championships title.
2008-02-02	Win	(France) Marouan Aatifi	French Savate Championships, Final 8	Paris, France	Decision		
2008-01-05	Win	(France) Georgy Fernante	French Savate Championships	Paris, France	Decision	5	2:00
2007-03-11	Win	(France) Sebastien Ornecipé	French Savate Championships Class B, Final	Paris, France	KO	3	
2006-04-00	Win	(France) Sadio Sissoko	French Kickboxing Championships, Final	Paris, France	Decision		
Wins French Kickboxing Championships Class A title.
Legend: Win Loss Draw/No contest Notes

== See also ==
- List of male kickboxers
