= Sudsakorn Sor Klinmee =

Thai Muay Thai kickboxer (born 1986)

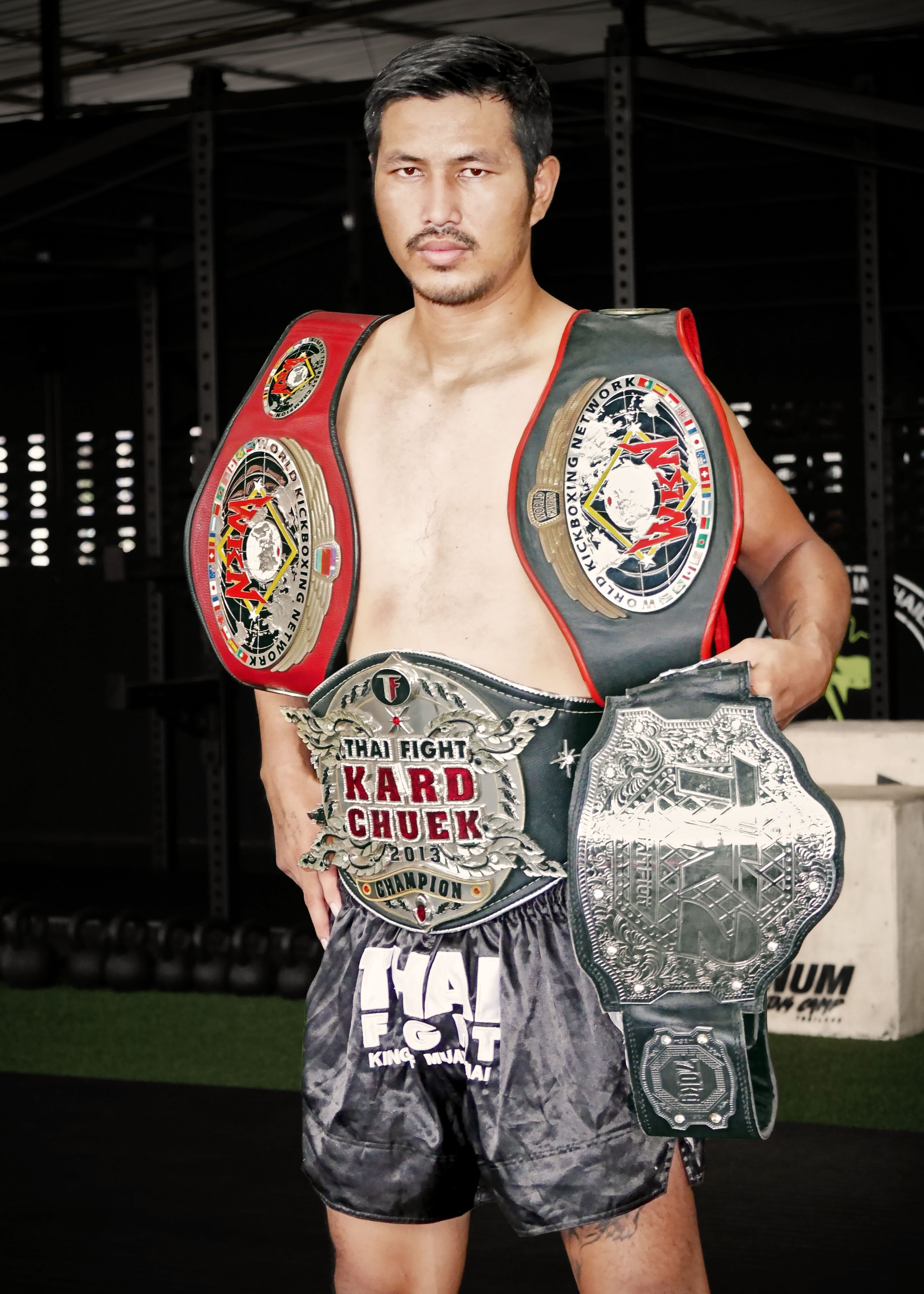
- Sudsakorn in 2016
- Born: Som Klinmee; August 25, 1986 (age 40); Pattaya, Thailand
- Native name: สม กลิ่นมี
- Other names: Sudsakorn Sor Klinmee; Sudsakorn Payabkumphan « O »
- Nationality: Thai
- Height: 1.82 m (5 ft 11 1/2 in)
- Weight: 75 kg (165 lb; 11.8 st)
- Division: Lightweight; Welterweight; Middleweight
- Style: Muay Thai, Kickboxing
- Fighting out of: Pattaya, Thailand
- Team: Sudsakorn Muay Thai Gym
- Trainer: Boom (Thailand)
- Years active: 1993–present

Kickboxing record
- Total: 365
- Wins: 297
- By knockout: 77
- Losses: 64
- Draws: 4

Other information
- Notable relatives: Rambaa Somdet (cousin); Sinsamut Klinmee (brother)
- Notable students: Nilmungkorn Sudsakorngym

Sudsakorn Sor Klinmee (Thai: สุดสาคร ส.กลิ่นมี; born August 25, 1986) is a Thai Muay Thai kickboxer and current Lion Fight Middleweight Champion. He is the former Thai Fight Kard Chuek Middleweight Champion and World Kickboxing Network Muay Thai Welterweight World Champion.

== Biography ==
Sudsakorn is one of Thailand's most famous fighter. His real name is Som Klinmee but his nickname is « O » among Thai people. He began practicing Muay Thai at the age of 6. He began training under his stepfather Yaak and his older cousin Rambaa Somdet M16. Between the ages of 10 and 18, he was taken in by his uncle Tappaya of the Sit-Or Gym in Pattaya. At 18, Sudsakorn met an Irishman named Graig O'Flynn, who opened the Sitjaipetch Gym. During this time, Sudsakorn fought four times in England and Ireland. Later on, he moved to the Scorpion Gym in Pattaya. When he was around 23, his uncle Tappaya retired and opened the Sor Klinmee Gym, where Sudsakorn had been training for the last six years. He received an offer to join the Fairtex Gym but refused to leave his uncle's gym. He became part of the Venum Team and moved to the Venum Training Camp for a couple of years before deciding to leave in order to open his Sudsakorn Muay Thai Gym, where he trains and teaches. Sudsakorn is also the owner of the recently opened Sudsakorn Arena Stadium, which consists of a complex of 7 men's football fields surrounded by some small shops. He has a younger brother named Sinsamut Klinmee, who currently competes for ONE Championship.

Sudsakorn's first European experience was in Ireland; where he had been living, training and teaching for three months. During his early career, he arrived in France in order to make a name for himself in Europe by fighting the best fighters in his weight class of 64–70 kg. In the early months of 2010, Sudsakorn lived and trained in Turin with his manager and friend Filippo Cinti. He fought around Italy for a couple of years before meeting his Italian wife in 2011. Married together one year later, the couple broke up at the beginning of 2021 and got divorced recently. Sudsakorn signed a contract with the Thai Fight promotion in 2011, which resulted in him fighting mostly in Thailand. In May 2013, he participated in a 32-man tournament: Thai Fight Kard Chuek. He would become the THAI FIGHT Kard Chuek tournament champion winning the final round against Saiyok Pumpanmuang on December 22, 2013. Sudsakorn also fought on a number of international Yokkao events beginning from 2012 on the promotion's first official event, Yokkao Extreme. He also joined other Muay Thai champions such as Buakaw Banchamek, Saenchai, Dzhabar Askerov and many others on the Yokkao-sponsored Muay Thai Combat Fan Expo in 2011, showcasing the sport to fans in Italy.

His fighting name is derived from a Thai folktale: Sudsakorn is a child brought up in the ancient mystical traditions of Thailand and embarks on a long and dangerous journey.

== Career ==
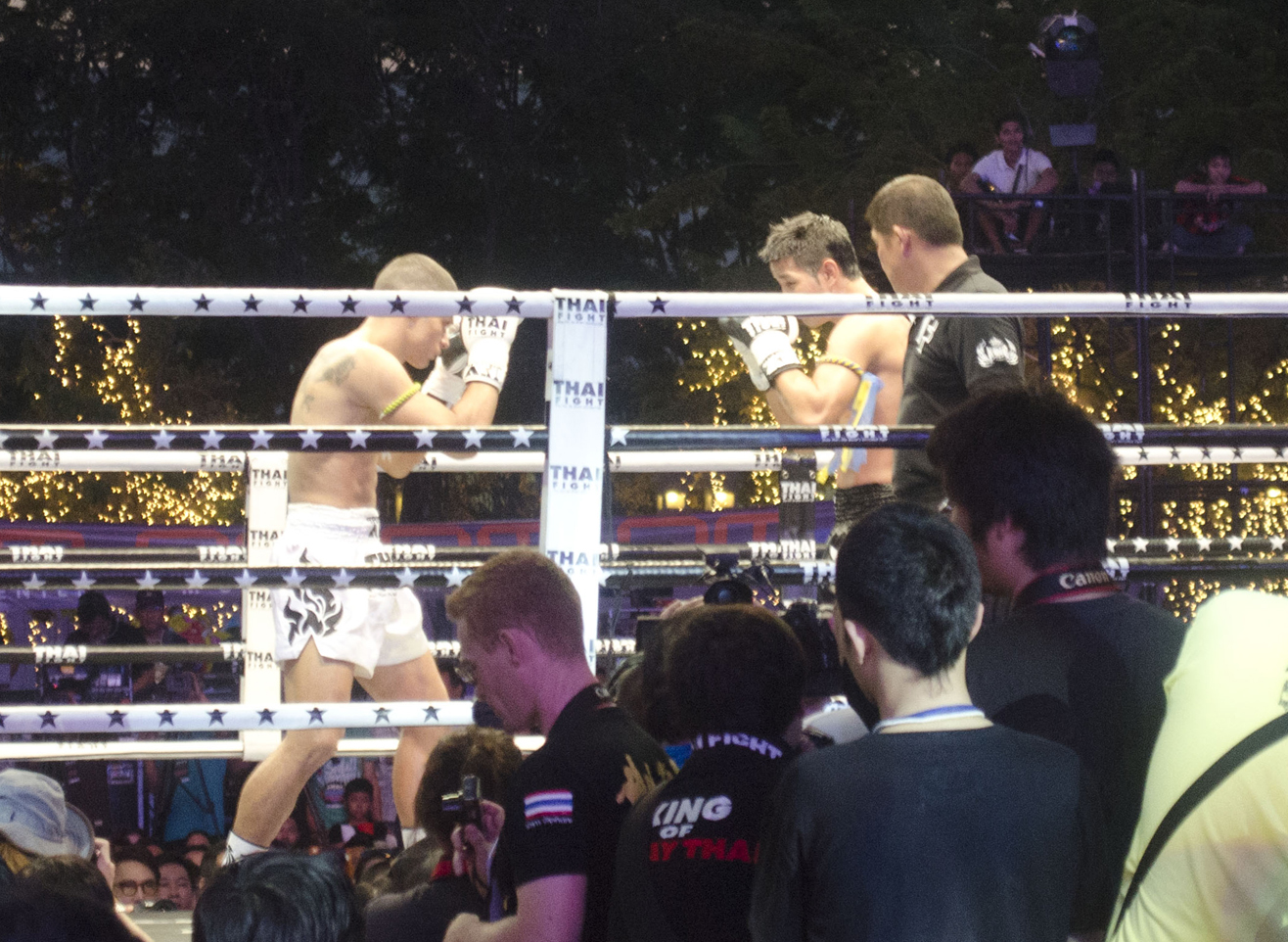
Sudsakorn against Gustavo Mendes at Thai Fight 2012 Final

During his time in Ireland, he beat Robert Storey, the British champion twice in 2005. (Sudsakorn weighed 61 kg at the time) During the rematch aired on Eurosport, Robert Storey had his arm fractured by a middle but nevertheless managed to go the 5 rounds.

A year later, in 2006, Sudsakorn won the WMC S1 World Championship belt (64 kg) at the King's Anniversary the 5th of December, against Slovak Egon Herzing.

His fondest memory is winning the WPMF World Professional Muaythai Federation title against fellow Thai fighter Ouadang Soukilatougsong in 2006.

Sudsakorn considers his greatest achievement to be beating Kaosanit Sopanpai, a Channel 7 Stadium champion, in 2007. The Channel 7 Tournament, held every Sunday in Bangkok, brings together all the champions having had at least 3 consecutive wins at the Rajadamnern Stadium, Lumpini Stadium or Omnoi Stadium.

He considers his toughest fight to be his victory over Kongfa Bergmun to win the Fairtex Theprasit 2007 belt.

On 21 January 2012, he fought Surinamese-Dutch kickboxer, Marco Piqué at Yokkao Extreme 2012 which was attended by 12,000 attendees. He won by unanimous decision after 3 rounds.

He fought Cedric Castagna at TK2 World MAX 2012 in Marseille, France, on October 6, 2012 and won by decision.

Sudsakorn took revenge on Mickael Piscitello by winning a decision at Yokkao Extreme 2013 in Milan, Italy on January 26, 2013.

He beat Yi Long by decision at Yokkao 9 in Xinyang, China on May 24, 2014 but Yi Long didn't want to accept his defeat and asked to the Chinese organisation of WLF to change the official verdict days after. Yokkao, official promoter of the event, refused his request as there was no contest, Sudsakorn absolutely dominated every round. Successively Yi Long has been refusing any proposal of a rematch.

On March 8, 2020, Sudsakorn defeated Magnus Andersson at Lion Fight 62 to win the Lion Fight Middleweight Championship.

=== Thai Fight ===
Sudsakorn would rise to popularity in Thailand after signing with the promotion Thai Fight. He made his promotional debut on May 14, 2011 at THAI FIGHT Extreme 2011: France, defeating Abdallah Mabel.

On April 17, 2012, he lost to Singmanee Kaewsamrit at THAI FIGHT Extreme 2012: Pattaya in the 2012 Isuzu Cup Superfight.

He faced Mickael Piscitello at THAI FIGHT Extreme 2012: France on September 19, 2012 in Lyon, France, and lost via TKO due to a cut in the second round.

In a non-tournament bout at the THAI FIGHT 2012: King of Muay Thai Tournament 2nd Round in Nakhon Ratchasima, Thailand on November 25, 2012, Sudsakorn knocked out Mohammad Hossein Doroudian with a vicious elbow strike in round two.

He beat Gustavo Mendes on points in another non-tournament match at the THAI FIGHT 2012: King of Muay Thai Tournament Finals in Bangkok on December 16, 2012.

He knocked out Veselin Veselinov in the third round at THAI FIGHT Extreme 2013: Muay Thai Day in Ayutthaya, Thailand on February 23, 2013.

On April 19, 2013, Sudsakorn knocked out Ong Phearak with a spinning elbow just seconds into round one at THAI FIGHT Extreme 2013: Pattaya in Pattaya, Thailand.

Sudsakorn coached a team of farangs against a rival team trained by Saiyok Pumpanmuang on the reality television series Thai Fight Kard Chuek, which was aired between July and August 2013 on Thailand's Channel 3. The two coaches eventually faced off on December 22, 2013. He defeated Saiyok by extension-round decision at the 2014 Thai Fight Final in Bangkok to become the inaugural Thai Fight 70 kg Kard Chuek King's Cup Champion.

It was reported that he would fight Victor Siangboxing at THAI FIGHT Extreme 2013: Bangkok in Bangkok on June 29, 2013. However, his opponent was changed to Dimitri Masson. He stopped Masson with low kicks in round three.

He TKO'd Ali Jadid in round two at THAI FIGHT EXTREME 2013: Pattani in Pattani, Thailand on September 22, 2013.

He beat Salah Khalifa by decision in a non-tournament match at the 2013 THAI FIGHT Semi-Finals in Bangkok, Thailand on November 30, 2013.

He beat Vahid Roshani by decision at THAI FIGHT World Battle 2014: Klai Kang Won in Hua Hin, Thailand on February 22, 2014.

On November 21, 2015, Sudsakorn defeated Miles Simson in the 2015 Thai Fight 72.5 kg King's Cup Tournament Semi-Final at THAI FIGHT RPCA.

However, he fell short of winning the title with a decision loss to Youssef Boughanem at THAI FIGHT Count Down in the Thai Fight 72.5 kg King's Cup Tournament Final on December 31, 2015.

On July 15, 2017, Sudsakorn set a promotional record for fastest knockout he knocked out Erick Massion in 9 seconds with one punch at THAI FIGHT We Love Yala.

== Titles and achievements ==
- Lion Fight
  - 2020 Lion Fight Middleweight Champion
- Thai Fight
  - 2015 Thai Fight Tournament Runner Up (−72.5 kg)
  - 2013 Thai Fight Kard Chuek Champion (−70 kg)
  - Fastest knockout in Thai Fight (9 seconds)
  - Most fights in Thai Fight (45)
  - 39–6 record
- Fight Code
  - 2011 Fight Code Dragon Series Runner Up (−72.5 kg)
- World Kickboxing Network (WKN)
  - 2010 World Kickboxing Network ) World Grand Prix BIG-8 Final 2010 in Belarus Champion (-66.7 kg)
  - 2010 WKN Muay Thai World Welterweight Champion (−66.7 kg)
- Fairtex Theprasit Stadium
  - 2007 Fairtex Theprasit Muay Thai Champion
- World Professional Muaythai Federation (WPMF)
  - 2006 WPMF World Super Lightweight Champion World Professional Championship Muaythai (−63.5 kg)
- World Muaythai Council (WMC)
  - 2006 WMC S1 World Champion - WMC S1 Songchai (−64 kg)
- Rajadamnern Stadium
  - 2004–2005 Toyota 4X4 Rajadamnern Finalist

== Fight record ==
Kickboxing record
297 Wins (77 KOs), 64 Losses, 4 Draws
| Date | Result | Opponent | Event | Method | Round | Time |
| 2026-10-05 | Loss | (China) Ouyang Feng | Zhijin International Combat Sports : China vs Thailand | TKO (3 knockdowns) | 2 | |
| 2024-12-21 | Loss | (Spain) Nayanesh Ayman | Fight Clubbing 36 | TKO (Doctor's stoppage) | 4 | 3:00 |
For the WMC MAD Super Middleweight Title & Fight Clubbing Super Middleweight Title.
| 2024-11-16 | Win | (China) Yuan Bing | Space ONE Champions | Decision | 3 | 3:00 |
Wins the vacant Space ONE Champions World -75kg title.
| 2024-10-25 | Loss | (China) Liu Mengyang | Zhong Long Fight | Decision | 3 | 3:00 |
| 2024-06-15 | Loss | (Cambodia) Lao Chantrea | Krud Kun Khmer: The Battle of Kings | Decision | 3 | 3:00 |
| 2024-01-04 | Loss | (Cambodia) Lao Chantrea | Krud Kun Khmer World Champion, Phnom Penh | Decision | 3 | 3:00 |
| 2023-05-20 | Win | (Italy) Federico Puddu | Fight Clubbing 31 | Decision (Unianimous) | 3 | 3:00 |
| 2023-04-15 | Loss | (Cambodia) Prom Samnang | Krud Kun Khmer World Champion, Siem Reap, Cambodia | Decision | 3 | 3:00 |
For Krud Kun Khmer Championship
| 2023-01-21 | Win | (France) Lassana Coulibaly | United Fight Night | Decision | 5 | 3:00 |
| 2023-01-02 | Loss | (Morocco) Youssef Boughanem | Golden King Promotions | KO (Knee to body) | 4 | |
For WMC Golden King -164 lb title.
| 2022-06-26 | Win | (Cambodia) Ly Rithy | THAI FIGHT Sisaket, Sisaket province, Thailand | KO | 1 | |
| 2022-05-29 | Win | (Finland) Ari Savolainen | THAI FIGHT Nakhon Sawan | KO | 2 | |
| 2022-05-08 | Win | (Chile) Miguel Araya | THAI FIGHT Sung Noen | KO | 1 | |
| 2022-01-29 | Draw | (Italy) Lorenzo Di Vara | Thai Boxe Mania 2022 | Decision | 3 | 3:00 |
| 2021-12-18 | Loss | (Italy) Fabio Puce | Fight Clubbing 28 | Decision (Unanimous) | 3 | 3:00 |
| 2020-03-08 | Win | (Sweden) Magnus Andersson | Lion Fight 62 | Decision (Unanimous) | 5 | 3:00 |
Won Lion Fight Middleweight title.
| 2019-10-26 | Win | (Estonia) Andi Uustalu | THAI FIGHT Bangsaen | Decision (Unanimous) | 3 | 3:00 |
| 2019-10-12 | Loss | (Belarus) Chingiz Allazov | Bellator Kickboxing 12 | Decision (Unanimous) | 3 | 3:00 |
| 2019-08-17 | Loss | (China) Han Feilong | EM-Legend 38 | Decision | 3 | 3:00 |
| 2019-04-27 | Win | (Albania) Samed Memaj | Fighting Spirit 7 | TKO (Spinning back Elbow + Kick) | 2 | |
| 2019-01-26 | Win | (Italy) Luca Tagliarino | YOKKAO 36 | TKO | 2 | |
| 2018-12-22 | Loss | (Russia) Magomed Zaynukov | MUAYTHAI FACTORY | Decision (Unanimous) | 3 | 3:00 |
For the vacant WMC Intercontinental -72.5kg title.
| 2018-12-01 | Loss | (China) Zheng Zhaoyu | Kunlun Fight City Hero | Decision (Majority) | 3 | 3:00 |
| 2018-11-04 | Win | (France) Sebastien Billard | All Star Fight | KO | 1 | 1:20 |
| 2018-09-15 | Loss | (Iran) Mohammad Ghaedibardeh | Shang Wu Hero | Decision (Unanimous) | 3 | 3:00 |
| 2018-08-25 | Win | (Iran) Ayob Saki | THAI FIGHT Rayong | Decision (Unanimous) | 4 | 3:00 |
| 2018-07-11 | Win | (Iran) Hossein Nasiri | CM Fight | KO (Low Kick) | 2 | |
| 2018-04-21 | Win | (Italy) Claudio Amoruso | THAI FIGHT Rome | KO (Low Kick) | 3 | |
| 2018-01-28 | Loss | (Belarus) Chingiz Allazov | Thai Boxe Mania | Decision | 3 | |
| 2017-12-23 | Loss | (Ukraine) Vasil Sorokin | THAI FIGHT Chiang Mai | Decision | 3 | |
| 2017-11-25 | Win | (Ukraine) Oleksandr Moisa | KHMER THAI FIGHT | Decision | 3 | |
| 2017-09-30 | Win | (The Gambia) Yankuba Juwara | THAI FIGHT Barcelona | KO | 3 | |
| 2017-07-15 | Win | (Belgium) Erick Massion | THAI FIGHT We Love Yala | KO (Right Hook) | 1 | 0:09 |
| 2017-05-27 | Win | (Italy) Martin Meoni | THAI FIGHT Italy | Decision (Unanimous) | 3 | 3:00 |
| 2017-04-29 | Win | (Italy) Anouar Khamlali | Amazing Fight Spirit | Decision (Unanimous) | 3 | 3:00 |
| 2017-04-08 | Win | (France) Johane Beausejour | THAI FIGHT Paris | Decision (Unanimous) | 3 | 3:00 |
| 2017-03-25 | Win | (Germany) Pascal Schroth | KOF.MTK | Decision | 3 | 3:00 |
| 2017-01-28 | Loss | (France) Jimmy Vienot | Thai Boxe Mania 2017 | Decision | 3 | 3:00 |
| 2016-12-24 | Loss | (France) Antuan Siangboxing | THAI FIGHT The Fighter King | Decision (Ex.Round 1) | 4 | 3:00 |
| 2016-11-19 | Win | (Germany) Pascal Schroth | THAI FIGHT AIR RACE 1 | Decision | 3 | 3:00 |
| 2016-10-15 | Loss | (Russia) Islam Murtazaev | THAI FIGHT Chengdu | Decision | 3 | 3:00 |
| 2016-09-11 | Win | (United Kingdom) Filip Kulawinski | THAI FIGHT London | Decision | 3 | 3:00 |
| 2016-08-20 | Win | (Malaysia) Jian Kai Chee | THAI FIGHT KMITL | KO | 1 | |
| 2016-07-02 | Win | (China) Zhao Chunyang | WLF Glory of Heros | TKO | 2 | 3:00 |
| 2016-04-30 | Win | (Brazil) Carlos Formiga | THAI FIGHT Samui 2016 | Decision (Unanimous) | 3 | 3:00 |
| 2016-05-21 | Loss | (Iran) Masoud Minaei | KOF.MTK | Decision | 3 | 3:00 |
| 2016-03-19 | Win | (Argentina) Luciano Vasquez | THAI FIGHT Korat | Decision (Unanimous) | 3 | |
| 2016-03-05 | Win | (China) Li Yankun | Wu Lin Feng | Decision(Unanimous) | 3 | 3:00 |
| 2016-02-20 | Win | (France) Dimitri Masson | QUSN | Decision | 3 | 3:00 |
| 2016-01-30 | Win | (France) Johane Beausejour | Thai Boxe Mania 2016 | Decision | 3 | 3:00 |
| 2015-12-31 | Loss | (Belgium) Youssef Boughanem | THAI FIGHT Count Down - 72 kg Tournament Final | Decision | 3 | |
| 2015-11-21 | Win | (Netherlands) Miles Simson | THAI FIGHT RPCA - 72 kg Tournament Semi-finals | Decision | 3 | |
| 2015-10-24 | Win | (England) Nicholas Carter | THAI FIGHT Vietnam | Decision | 3 | |
| 2015-09-17 | Win | (Russia) Ivan Kosykh | THAI FIGHT Moscow | Decision(unanimous) | 3 | |
| 2015-08-22 | Win | (Morocco) Anes Lahkmari | THAI FIGHT Narathiwat | KO(Spinning back Elbow) | 2 | |
| 2015-07-18 | Win | (France) Samuel Andoche | THAI FIGHT Shaolin | Decision(Unanimous) | 3 | |
| 2015-05-02 | Win | (France) Ramzi Nouainia | THAI FIGHT Samui 2015 | TKO(Low kicks) | 3 | |
| 2015-04-04 | Win | (Brazil) Alex Oller | THAI FIGHT CRMA | Decision | 3 | 3:00 |
| 2015-03-15 | Loss | (China) Aotegen Bateer | (English boxe) GISA - 73 kg | Decision | 3 | 3:00 |
| 2014-12-21 | Win | (Myanmar) Gow Sauo | THAI FIGHT 2014 - 73 kg | KO | 1 | |
| 2014-11-22 | Win | (Sweden) Carl N'Diaye | THAI FIGHT 2014 - 73 kg | KO | 2 | 3:00 |
| 2014-05-24 | Win | (China) Yi Long | Yokkao 9 | Decision | 3 | 3:00 |
| 2014-04-06 | Win | (Canada) Matthew Richardson | THAI FIGHT World Battle 2014: Chakrinaruebet | Decision | 3 | 3:00 |
| 2014-02-22 | Win | (Iran) Vahid Roshani | THAI FIGHT World Battle 2014: Klai Kang Won | Decision | 3 | 3:00 |
| 2013-12-22 | Win | (Thailand) Saiyok Pumpanmuang | THAI FIGHT 2013 - Thai Fight Kard Chuek Final | Ext R. Decision | 4 | 3:00 |
Wins THAI FIGHT Kard Chuek Tournament.
| 2013-11-30 | Win | (England) Salah Khalifa | THAI FIGHT 2013 -70 kg/154 lb Tournament | Decision | 3 | 3:00 |
| 2013-09-22 | Win | (Iran) Ali Jadid | THAI FIGHT Extreme 2013: Pattani | TKO (punches) | 2 | |
| 2013-07-29 | Win | (France) Crice Boussoukou | THAI FIGHT Kard Chuek - Semi-finals | Decision | 3 | |
| 2013-07-14 | Win | (Morocco) Lahoucine Idouche | THAI FIGHT Kard Chuek - Quarter-finals | KO (punches) | 1 | |
| 2013-06-29 | Win | (France) Dimitri Masson | THAI FIGHT Extreme 2013: Bangkok | TKO (right low kick) | 3 | |
| 2013-06-15 | Win | (Brazil) Victor Hugo Nunes | THAI FIGHT Kard Chuek - 1/8 finals | Decision | 3 | |
| 2013-06-01 | Win | (Iran) Seyedisa Alamdarnezam | THAI FIGHT Kard Chuek - 1/16 finals | Ext R. Decision | 4 | |
| 2013-04-19 | Win | (Cambodia) Ong Phearak | THAI FIGHT Extreme 2013: Pattaya | KO (right spinning elbow) | 1 | |
| 2013-02-23 | Win | (Bulgaria) Veselin Veselinov | THAI FIGHT Extreme 2013: Muay Thai Day | KO (right cross) | 3 | |
| 2013-01-26 | Win | (France) Mickael Piscitello | Yokkao Extreme 2013 | Decision (unanimous) | 3 | 3:00 |
| 2012-12-16 | Win | (Brazil) Gustavo Mendes | THAI FIGHT 2012: Tournament Finals | Decision | 3 | 3:00 |
| 2012-11-25 | Win | (Iran) Mohammad Hossein Doroudian | THAI FIGHT 2012: 2nd Round | KO (right elbow) | 2 | |
| 2012-10-06 | Win | (France) Cédric Castagna | TK2 World Max 2012 | Decision | 3 | 3:00 |
| 2012-09-19 | Loss | (France) Mickael Piscitello | THAI FIGHT Extreme 2012: France | TKO (cut) | 2 | |
| 2011-08-17 | Win | (France) Issam Reghi | THAI FIGHT Extreme 2012: England | Decision | 3 | 3:00 |
| 2012-06-14 | Win | (Morocco) Hichem Chaïbi | Best of Siam | Decision | 5 | 3:00 |
| 2012-04-17 | Loss | (Thailand) Singmanee Kaewsamrit | THAI FIGHT Extreme 2012: Pattaya | Decision | 3 | 3:00 |
| 2012-01-21 | Win | (Suriname) Marco Piqué | Yokkao Extreme 2012 | Decision (Unanimous) | 3 | 3:00 |
| 2011-12-17 | Loss | (Belarus) Yury Bessmertny | Fight Code - Dragon Series, Final | Decision | 3 | 3:00 |
Fight was for Fight Code Dragon Series Tournament title (-72.5 kg).
| 2011-12-17 | Win | (France) Abdallah Mabel | Fight Code - Dragon Series, Semi Final | Decision (Unanimous) | 3 | 3:00 |
| 2011-10-15 | Win | (Netherlands) Halim Issaoui | Fight Code - Dragon Series, Final 8 | TKO (low kicks) | 3 | 1:05 |
| 2011-08-07 | Win | (Japan) Nishikawa Tomoyuki | THAI FIGHT Extreme 2011: Japan | Decision | 3 | 3:00 |
| 2011-07-17 | Win | (Spain) Aitor Alonso | THAI FIGHT Extreme 2011: Hong Kong | TKO | 2 | |
| 2011-05-14 | Win | (France) Abdallah Mabel | THAI FIGHT Extreme 2011: France | Decision | 3 | 3:00 |
| 2011-03-12 | Win | (China) Xu Yan | Fight Code: Dragon Series Round 2 | Decision | 3 | 3:00 |
| 2011-01-29 | Loss | (Italy) Giorgio Petrosyan | Thai Boxe Mania 2011 | Decision | 3 | 3:00 |
| 2011-01-15 | Win | (Thailand) Kem Sitsongpeenong | Isuzu Tournament Second Round, Omnoi Stadium | Decision | 5 | 3:00 |
| 2010-12-11 | Win | (Thailand) Kongjak Sor Tuantong | Isuzu Tournament First Round, Omnoi Stadium | Decision | 5 | 3:00 |
| 2010-11-04 | Win | (Thailand) Big Ben Chor Praram 6 | Fairtex Theprasit Boxing Stadium | KO | 2 | |
| 2010-09-12 | Win | (Belarus) Andrei Kulebin | W.K.N. Belarus Big 8 Tournament, Final | TKO (Doc Stop/Cut) | 2 | |
Wins W.K.N. World Grand Prix BIG-8 Final 2010 in Belarus title.
| 2010-09-12 | Win | (Ukraine) Ruslan Kushnirenko | W.K.N. Belarus Big 8 Tournament, Semi Final | Decision | 3 | 3:00 |
| 2010-09-12 | Win | (United States) Michael Mananquil | W.K.N. Belarus Big 8 Tournament, Quarter Final | Decision | 3 | 3:00 |
| 2010-08-02 | Win | (Thailand) Tawalit | Fairtex Theprasit Boxing Stadium | TKO (Referee stoppage) | 4 | 1:00 |
| 2010-04-24 | Win | (France) Djimé Coulibaly | FightZone 4, Maison des Sports | Decision | 5 | 3:00 |
| 2010-04-10 | Win | (France) Houcine Bennoui | Sherdana K-1 Gala | Decision | 5 | 3:00 |
| 2010-03-25 | Win | (France) Wilfrid Montagne | Planet Battle, Queen Elizabeth Stadium | KO | 1 | |
| 2010-03-13 | Win | (Morocco) Chahid Oulad El Hadj | Oktagon presents: It's Showtime 2010 | Decision (Majority) | 3 | 3:00 |
| 2010-01-30 | Win | (Belarus) Andrei Kulebin | Campionato Mondiale Thai Boxe | KO (Straight Right) | 2 | |
Wins vacant W.K.N. Muay Thai welterweight world title -66.7 kg.
| 2009-10-10 | Win | (Italy) Angelo Campoli | Gala Kickboxing Superstar at Palalido | KO | 4 | |
| 2009-10-10 | Win | (Thailand) Amnoydet Petsoupapan | | KO | 2 | |
| 2009-09-18 | Loss | (Thailand) Kem Sitsongpeenong | Kiatpet Fights, Lumpini Stadium | TKO (Referee stoppage) | 3 | |
| 2009-08-15 | Win | (Morocco) Salahdine Ait Naceur | Moroccan King's Birthday Event | Decision | 3 | 3:00 |
| 2009-07-26 | Win | (Thailand) Noppadet Chengsimewe Gym | TV 7 Stadium | Decision | 5 | 3:00 |
| 2009-06-20 | Win | (Thailand) Attachai Fairtex | Gala de Levallois | Decision | 5 | 3:00 |
| 2009-04-12 | Loss | (Thailand) Noppadet Chengsimewe Gym | TV 7 Stadium | Decision | 5 | 3:00 |
| 2009-03-15 | Win | (Thailand) Kongfar Uddonmuang | TV 7 Stadium | Decision | 5 | 3:00 |
| 2009-01-31 | Win | (France) Farid Khider | Diamond Fight World Tour | KO | 3 | |
| 2008-12-20 | Draw | (France) Moussa Konaté | K1 Survivor - Salle Carpentier | Decision Draw | 5 | 3:00 |
| 2008-11-29 | Loss | (France) Fabio Pinca | La Nuit des Champions 2008 | TKO | 5 | |
Fight was for "Nuit des Champions" Muaythai belt.
| 2008-10-13 | Win | (France) Ismael Grid | Fairtex Theprasit Boxing Stadium | Decision | 5 | 3:00 |
| 2008-07-19 | Loss | (Thailand) Karuhas Eakchumpon | | Decision | 5 | 3:00 |
| 2008-05-24 | Loss | (Thailand) Nopolite Louksamlong | Lumpini Stadium | Decision | 5 | 3:00 |
| 2008-03-30 | Win | (Australia) Soren Monkongtong | | Decision | 5 | 3:00 |
| 2008-02-09 | Win | (France) Cédric Muller | Le Choc Des Légendes II | Decision | 5 | 3:00 |
| 2007-10-22 | Win | (Thailand) Numeechai | Fairtex Theprasit Boxing Stadium | Decision | 5 | 3:00 |
| 2007-04-05 | Win | (Thailand) Kongfa Bergmun | Fairtex Theprasit Boxing Stadium | Decision | 5 | 3:00 |
| 2007-03-12 | Win | (Thailand) Charnlong | Fairtex Theprasit Boxing Stadium | Decision | 5 | 3:00 |
| 2007 | Win | (Thailand) Kongfa Bergmun | Fairtex Theprasit Boxing Stadium | Decision | 5 | 3:00 |
Wins Fairtex Theprasit Muaythai title.
| 2007 | Win | (Thailand) Kaosanit Sopanpai | Fairtex Theprasit Boxing Stadium | Decision | 5 | 3:00 |
| 2007 | Win | (Thailand) Chang Puak | Fairtex Theprasit Boxing Stadium | Decision | 5 | 3:00 |
| 2007 | Loss | (Thailand) Numeechai | Fairtex Theprasit Boxing Stadium | Decision | 5 | 3:00 |
| 2007 | Loss | (Thailand) Numeechai | Fairtex Theprasit Boxing Stadium | | | |
| 2006-12-04 | Win | (Slovakia) Egon Herzing | King's Anniversary - Sanam Luang Park | Decision | 5 | 3:00 |
Wins WMC S1 World title.
| 2006 | Win | (Thailand) Ouadang Soukilatougsong | WPMF Championship | | | |
Wins WPMF World title.
| 2005-12-19 | Win | (England) Robert Storey | KICKmas III - Ulster Hall | Decision | 5 | 3:00 |
| 2005-10-15 | Win | (England) Robert Storey | England vs Thailand Muay Thai Warriors | Decision | 5 | 3:00 |
| 2005 | Win | (Thailand) Ratananoi | Fairtex Theprasit Boxing Stadium | Decision | 5 | 3:00 |
| 2005 | Loss | (Czech Republic) Pavol Kolesár | Fairtex Theprasit Boxing Stadium | KO | 4 | |
| 2005 | Loss | (Thailand) Somphot | Fairtex Theprasit Boxing Stadium | | | |
| 2005 | Loss | (Thailand) Somphot | Fairtex Theprasit Boxing Stadium | | | |
Legend: Win Loss Draw/No contest Notes

== See also ==
- List of male kickboxers
- Sudsakorn
