= Moussa Konaté (kickboxer) =

French Muay Thai kickboxer (born 1978)

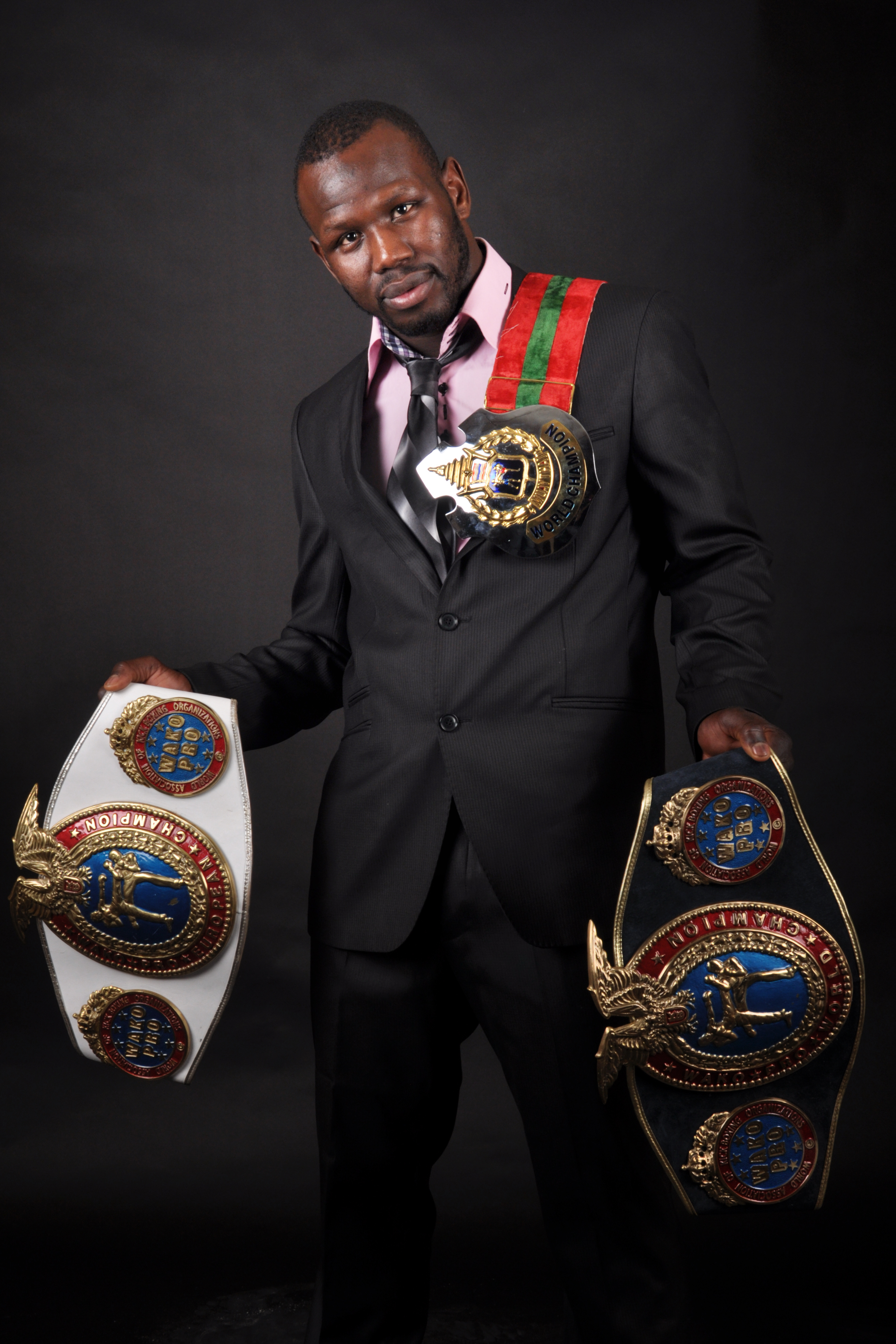
- Born: May 16, 1978 (age 48); France
- Nationality: (France) French (Mali) Malian
- Height: 1.73 m (5 ft 8 in)
- Weight: 70 kg (150 lb; 11 st)
- Division: Welterweight
- Style: Muaythai
- Fighting out of: Villiers-sur-Marne, France
- Team: Escale Boxing Club (EBC) - Konateam

Kickboxing record
- Total: 116
- Wins: 88
- By knockout: 36
- Losses: 23
- Draws: 5
- Last updated on: July 14, 2011

Moussa Konaté (born May 16, 1978) is a French Muay Thai kickboxer who trains in Villiers-sur-Marne, France. Moussa Konaté is a professional Muay Thai kickboxer, he is coach in Villiers-sur-Marne, in his own club called KONATEAM. He is the former WAKO Pro European and World Muaythai champion.

== Kickboxing career ==
Konaté fought Bruno Bigot for the WAKO Pro World Muaythai title during Maxi Fight 1. Konaté won the fight by a fourth round TKO.

Moussa took part in an eight man Gala International De Boxe Thai 73 kg tournament. He beat Philippe Salmon by decision in quarter finals, Ludovic Millet by KO in the semifinals, but lost to Bakari Tounkara by KO in the finals.

== Titles and accomplishments ==
- 2011 8 Men 73 kg Tournament Runner Up in Bagnolet, France (-73 kg)
- 2009 WAKO Pro World Muaythai Champion (-73 kg)
- 2009 T8 World Final Tournament Champion
- 2008 WAKO Pro European Muaythai Champion (-71 kg)
- 2004 WPKL World Kickboxing Champion
- 2003 French Kickboxing Champion
- 2002 WPKL World Kickboxing Champion
- 2002 French Kickboxing Champion
- 2001 French Kickboxing Champion

== Muay Thai record ==
Muay Thai record
88 wins (36 (T)KOs), 23 losses, 5 draws
Date	Result	Opponent	Event	Location	Method	Round	Time
2012-04-28	Loss	(France) Raphaël Llodra	Gala international de Boxe Thai & K1 Rules	Bagnolet, France	TKO	3	
2011-04-30	Loss	(France) Bakari Tounkara	8 Men 73 kg Tournament, Final	Bagnolet, France	KO	2	
Fight was for 8 Men 73 kg Tournament title (-73 kg).
2011-04-30	Win	(France) Ludovic Millet	8 Men 73 kg Tournament, Semi Final	Bagnolet, France	KO	2	
2011-04-30	Win	(France) Philippe Salmon	8 Men 73 kg Tournament, Quarter Final	Bagnolet, France	Decision	3	3:00
2010-10-15	Loss	(France) Farid Villaume	Maxi Fight 2	Stade de l'Est, Réunion	Decision	5	3:00
2010-06-04	Loss	(Thailand) Bovy Sor Udomson	Ultimate Thai V / Muyathaitv Trophy	Paris, France	Decision	5	3:00
2010-04-24	Loss	(France) Gregory Choplin	Fight Zone 4	Villeurbanne, France	Decision (unanimous)	5	3:00
2010-03-06	Draw	(France) Ahmed Hassan	Muaythai Gala in Milizac	Milizac, France	Decision draw	5	3:00
2009-10-09	Win	(France) Bruno Bigot	Maxi Fight 1	Stade de l'Est, Réunion	TKO (doctor stoppage)	4	
Wins WAKO Pro World Muaythai title.
2009-06-06	Win	(Cameroon) Herbet Womaleu	Muaythai Gala in Angers	Angers, France	Decision	5	3:00
2009-04-25	Win	(Portugal) Gil Silva	De Villiers à Bangkok	Villiers-sur-Marne, France	Decision	5	3:00
Wins WAKO Pro World Muaythai title (-73 kg).
2009-01-31	Win	(France) Sofiane Allouache	La Nuit des Titans IV, Final	Tours, France	TKO	3	
Wins T8 World Final Tournament title.
2009-01-31	Win	(France) Rachid Kabbouri	La Nuit des Titans IV, Semi Final	Tours, France	Decision	3	2:00
2009-01-31	Win	(France) Yohan Lidon	La Nuit des Titans IV, Quarter Final	Tours, France	Decision	3	2:00
2008-12-20	Draw	(Thailand) Sudsakorn Sor Klinmee	K1 Survivor - Salle Carpentier	Paris, France	Decision draw	5	3:00
2008-11-06	Draw	(France) Djimé Coulibaly	Gala de Levallois	Levallois, France	Decision draw	5	3:00
2008-06-07	Draw	(France) Rafik Bakkouri	Gala in Bercy	Paris-Bercy, France	Decision draw	5	3:00
2008-04-26	Win	(France) Nicolas Germain	5ème Gala de Pau	Pau, France	Decision	5	3:00
2008-03-08	Win	(Portugal) Flavio Santos	Muaythai à Villiers-sur-Marne	Villiers-sur-Marne, France	KO (spinning back kick)	4	
Wins WAKO Pro European Muaythai title (-71 kg).
2008-02-09	Loss	(France) Salahdine Ait Naceur	Les chocs de légende 2	Saint-Ouen, France	Decision	5	3:00
2007-12-01	Win	(France) Khadda Redouani	Gala de St Pryvé St Mesmin	Saint-Privé Saint-Mesmin, France	Decision	5	3:00
2007-11-09	Loss	(France) Bruno Bigot	La Nuit des Défis	Saint-Denis, Réunion	Decision	5	3:00
2007-05-29	Loss	(France) Cédric Muller	Fight Zone I	Villeurbanne, France	Decision	5	3:00
2007-04-07	Loss	(France) Djimé Coulibaly	La Nuit des Supers Fights VII, Quarter Final	Villebon, France	Decision	3	3:00
2007-02-10	Win	(France) Mohamed Bourkhis	La Nuit des Superfights VI	Villebon, France	TKO (cut)	5	
2006-12-16	Draw	(France) Rafik Bakkouri	La Nuit des Superfights V	Villebon, France	Decision draw	5	3:00
2006-09-21	Loss	(Portugal) José Reis	A-1 Final 8 Ankara	Ankara, Turkey			
2006-04-22	Loss	(France) Abdallah Mabel	Nuit du Muay Thaï et des Arts Martiaux	Pau, Pyrénées-AtlantiquesPau, France	Decision	5	3:00
2006-03-11	Win	(France) Olivier Elisabeth	La 9ème Nuit des Boxeurs Thaï	Brest, France	Decision	5	3:00
2005-04-09	Win	(Germany) Roman Logisch	SuperLeague Austria 2005	Austria	Decision	5	3:00
2004-12-18	Loss	(United Kingdom) Peter Crooke	SuperLeague Netherlands 2004	Netherlands	Decision	5	3:00
2004-03-20	Loss	(Netherlands) Chris Van Venrooij	SuperLeague Italy 2004	Italy	Decision	5	3:00
2003-09-27	Loss	(Netherlands) Albert Kraus	SuperLeague Germany 2003	Wuppertal, Germany	TKO (corner stop)	2	3:00
2003-05-10	Win	(Netherlands) Noel Soares	SuperLeague Austria 2003	Austria	Decision	5	3:00
2003-12-01	Loss	(Thailand) Nonthacsai Sitoo	Muaythai Gala	Helsinki, Finland	Decision	5	3:00
2002-07-07	Loss	(Thailand) Po Sai Por Patanachai	Muaythai Gala in Trieste	Trieste, Italy	Decision	5	3:00
2002-06-29	Loss	(France) Farid Khider	Le Défi du Muaythai	Saint-Ouen, France	Decision (unanimous)	5	3:00
Legend: Win Loss Draw/no contest Notes

== See also ==
- List of male kickboxers
