= Twins Special =

Thai sports equipment manufacturer

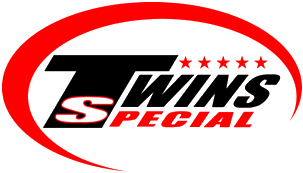
- Type: Limited
- Industry: Sports equipment Textile
- Founded: 1992; 34 years ago in Krathum Baen, Samut Sakhon
- Founder: Narong Wongprasertkan
- Headquarters: Krathum Baen, Samut Sakhon, Thailand
- Area served: Worldwide
- Key people: Narong Wongprasertkan (President); Pravinwat Wongprasertkan (CEO)
- Products: Boxing gloves and equipment, clothing
- Website: twinsspecial.com

Twins Special Co., Ltd., also known as Twins Special, is a Thai sports equipment manufacturing company, focused on Muay Thai, boxing, and physical fitness, which markets its products worldwide. The company based on Suan Luang, Krathum Baen, Samut Sakhon, outskirts Bangkok.

Twins Special was founded in 1992 from a small shophouse to a standard factory with over 500 workers. To this day, it produces more than ten thousand boxing gloves and exports to foreign countries a month. In the 1990s, it subsequently sponsored Samson Dutch Boy Gym, Ratanapol Sor Vorapin, Sirimongkol Singmanasak, Pongsaklek Wonjongkam, Veeraphol Sahaprom, and many other Thai boxers.

The company is also licensed as a boxing glove for competitions of four major organizations, consists of World Boxing Council (WBC), World Boxing Association (WBA), International Boxing Federation (IBF), and World Boxing Organization (WBO).

One point of Twins Special is the production of boxing gloves and trunks in a variety of colours and patterns to attract people of all genders and ages, such as children or women, to become more interested in combat sports.

It currently has four outlets in total: Suan Luang, Krathum Baen, Samut Sakhon (headquarters), Rajadamnern Boxing Stadium, Bangkok, Lumpinee Boxing Stadium, Bangkok, and Suan Luang Square in the Suan Luang quarter near National Stadium, Bangkok.

== See more ==
- Fairtex
- Grand Sport
- FBT
