= Fabio Siciliani =

- Born: June 18, 1981 (age 45); Bari, Italy
- Nationality: Italy
- Height: 1.81 m (5 ft 11 1/2 in)
- Weight: 75 kg (165 lb; 11.8 st)
- Division: Middleweight
- Style: Muay Thai
- Fighting out of: Lecce - ACSD Oltrecorpo, Italy
- Team: Acsd Oltrecorpo - Team Siciliani

Kickboxing record
- Total: 78
- Wins: 59
- By knockout: 26
- Losses: 15
- Draws: 4

Fabio Siciliani is a Muay thai kickboxer. Six Times Professional World Champion Muay Thai (WAKO, ISKA, WKU, WMF PRO, WMF World Championship, ONE SONGCHAI), International Champion WAKO, One Songchai Champion, Italian Champion. Muay Thai Khru. Head Coach Italian Team.

== Titles ==
- Professional:
  - 2016 World Champion WKU PRO 75 kg
  - 2014 Oktagon Champion
  - 2014 World Champion WMF PRO 75 kg
  - 2014 Thai Boxe Mania Champion
  - 2013 World Champion Muay thai ISKA
  - 2012 Oktagon Champion
  - 2011 OneSongchai World Champion tournament
  - 2011 OneSongchai Champion
  - 2010 OneSongchai Muay Thai Italian Tournament Champion
  - 2009 World Champion Muay Thai Wako-Pro 71,8 kg
  - 2006 Intercontinental Champion Muay Thai Wako-Pro 71,8 kg
- Amateur:
  - 2014 Gold Medal World Muay Thai Championship, Pattaya Thailand
  - 2009 Silver Medal World Muay Thai Championships, Bangkok Thailand
  - 2008 Italian Champion
  - 2005 Bronze Medal World Muay Thai Championships, Bangkok Thailand
  - 2004 Silver Medal European Championship, Praga EMC-WMF
  - 2002 Italian Champion

== Muay Thai record ==
Kickboxing record
78 fights, 59 Wins (26 (T)KO's), 15 Losses, 4 Draws
Date	Result	Opponent	Event	Location	Method	Round	Time
30.04.2016	Win	(Morocco) Jaouad El Byari	Fight Clubbing 20	Kindergarten Bologna, Italy	KO	1	
11.04.2015	Loss	(France) Karim Ghajji	Oktagon 2015: 20 Years Edition	Milan, Italy	Decision (unanimous)	3	
21.03.2015	Win	(Belgium) Nordyne Said	La nuit du muay thai	Elouges, Belgio	Per decisione	5	
27.07.2014	Win	(Portugal) Dan Balsemao	WMF PRO - Evolution Fight	Rosolini, Italy	KOT	2	
05.04.2014	Win	(Thailand) Prakaysaeng Gaiyanghadao	Oktagon 2014	Milano, Italy	Per decisione	3	
20.03.2014	Win	(Portugal) Fabio Teixeira	Final WMF World muay thai Championship	Pattaya, Thailand	Per decisione	3	
18.03.2014	Win	(Brazil) Bernardo Braga	Semi-final WMF World muay thai Championship	Pattaya, Thailand	Per decisione	3	
16.03.2014	Win	(Hong Kong) Wong Holan Hon Glina	WMF World muay thai Championship	Pattaya, Thailand	KO	1	
15.03.2014	Win	(Bulgaria) Atanan Bojinov	WMF World muay thai Championship	Pattaya, Thailand	Per decisione	3	
25.01.2014	Win	(Italy) Orgest Farruku	Thai Boxe Mania	Torino, Italy	KO	1	
31.08.2013	Win	(France) Mohamed Houmer	Evolution Fight	Rosolini, Italy	Per decisione	5	
31.05.2013	Win	(France) Almeyda Dino	Fight Clubbing 10	Kindergarten Bologna, Italy	KO	1	
02.02.2013	Draw	(Thailand) Nonsai Sor.Sanyakorn	Muay Thai Challenger	Lecce, Italy	Per Decisione	3	
07.01.2013	Loss	(Malaysia) Faizal Ramli	I-1 World Muay Thai Championship	Hong Kong, Cina	Per decisione	3	
08.12.2012	Loss	(Turkey) Aydin Tuncay	International Fight Show 2012	Loano, Italy	KOT	2	
08.12.2012	Win	(France) Johane Beausejour	International Fight Show 2012	Loano, Italy	Per Decisione	3	
29.09.2012	Draw	(Italy) Giuseppe D'Amuri	La Notte dei Gladiatori 2	Lecce, Italy	Per decisione	3	
27.04.2012	Win	(Luxembourg) Kevin Haas	Fight Clubbing 2, Kindergarten	Kindergarten Bologna, Italy	Per Decisione	3	
24.03.2012	Win	(Italy) Marco Re	Oktagon 2012	Milano, Italy	KOT	1	
04.02.2012	Draw	(Italy) Sharos Huyer	Thai Boxe Mania 2012	Totino, Italy	Per Decisione	3	
04.01.2012	Win	(Spain) Saidou Diaby	Gran Gala Muay Thai	Lecce, Italy	KO	1	
04.06.2011	Win	(Thailand) Moses Tor Sangtiennoi	OneSongchai World Champion Tournament	Tivoli, Italy	Per Decisione	3	
04.06.2011	Win	(Italy) Rosario Presti	OneSongchai World Champion Tournament	Tivoli, Italy	Per Decisione	3	
27.05.2011	Loss	(Luxembourg) Kevin Haas	La Nuit des Titans	Parigi, France]	Per Decisione	3	
11.04.2011	Win	(Italy) Alex Galavotti	Italian Extreme 9	Modena, Italy	Per Decisione	5	
12.02.2011	Win	(Thailand) Kwan Rahannok	Titolo Onesongchai	Lecce, Italy	Per Decisione	5	
05.12.2010	Win	(Thailand) Chongangdei P. Sripat	King's Cup	Bangkok, Thailand]	Per Decisione	5	
12.08.2010	Loss	(Thailand) Yaa	Queen's Cup	Bangkok, Thailand	Per Decisione	3	
01.05.2010	Loss	(France) Cédric Muller	La Grande Sfida su 4 Angoli	Rimini, Italy	Per Decisione	3	
27.02.2010	Win	(Italy) Lorenzo Capunata	Italian Extreme 8, Onesongchai Italian Tournament	Modena, Italy	KO	3	
27.02.2010	Win	(Italy) Fernando Calzetta	Italian Extreme 8, Onesongchai Italian Tournament	Modena, Italy	KO	2	
05.12.2009	Win	(Thailand) Satanveha Luktapfa	Onesongchai Promotion	Bangkok, Thailand	Per Decisione	5	
05.12.2009	Loss	(Germany) No name	King's Cup	Bangkok, Thailand	Per Decisione	5	
12.07.2009	Loss	(France) Farid Villaume	Wako-Pro World Title	Marrakech, Marocco	KO	2	
11.04.2009	Win	(Croatia) Ante Lucic	Wako-Pro World Title	Lecce, Italy	KO	1	
17–21.03.2009	Loss	(France)	World Championship WMF	Bangkok, Thailand	Decision	4	
17–21.03.2009	Win	(Wales)	World Championship WMF	Bangkok, Thailand	KO	2	
17–21.03.2009	Win	(India)	World Championship WMF	Bangkok, Thailand	KO	1	
06.07.2008	Draw	(France) Abdallah Mabel	The Warrior's Fighting 9	Montecatini Terme, Italy	Per Decisione	5	
21.01.2008	Win	(Italy) Fabio Fanti	Italian Championship	Napoli, Italy	Per Decisione	3	
09.12.2007	Loss	(Belarus) Dmitry Valent	Wako-Pro World Title	Lecce, Italy	KO	4	
25.11.2007	Win	(Hungary) Pendar		Santeramo in Colle, Italy	KO	2	
05.05.2007	Win	(France) Boudrir		Bologna, Italy	KO	1	
05.04.2007	Loss	(Armenia) Armen Petrosyan	Trieste Fight Night	Trieste, Italy	KOT	4	
27.11.2006	Win	(Portugal) Arnaldo Silva	Gladiatori 5	Bologna, Italy	KO	5	
30.07.2006	Win	(Italy) Diego Ballardin		Jesolo, Italy	Per Decisione	5	
20.05.2006	Win	(Italy) Luca Caputo		Bologna, Italy	Per Decisione	5	
27.11.2005	Win	(Italy) Marco Santi	Gladiatori 4	Bologna, Italy	Per Decisione	5	
Legend: Win Loss Draw/No contest
