= Baker Barakat =

German boxer and kickboxer

- Born: Bakir Barakat; 1981-03-20; Al-Hasakah, Syria
- Other names: Mr. Energy
- Nationality: German, Kurdish
- Height: 1.70 m (5 ft 7 in)
- Weight: 70.0 kg (154.3 lb; 11.02 st)
- Division: Welterweight (Kickboxing); Super Middleweight (Boxing)
- Style: Kickboxing, Muay Thai, Boxing
- Fighting out of: Euskirchen, Germany
- Team: Energy Gym
- Trainer: Frank Fritze

Professional boxing record
- Total: 64
- Wins: 41
- By knockout: 27
- Losses: 19
- By knockout: 8
- Draws: 4

Other information
- Boxing record from BoxRec
- Last updated on: September 11, 2014

Baker Barakat is a Kurdish boxer and kickboxer from Al-Hasakah, Syria.

== Kickboxing record ==
Kickboxing Record (incomplete)
21 Wins (8 (T)KO's), 23 Losses
Date	Result	Opponent	Event	Location	Method	Round	Time
2014-12-06	Loss	(Greece) Levan Guruli	Kickmas 2014, Semi Finals	Hamburg, Germany	Decision	3	3:00
2014-04-12	Win	(Greece) Levan Guruli	Euskirchener Fight Night	Euskirchen, Germany	TKO	3	2:45
2013-11-23	Loss	(Ukraine) Artur Kyshenko	KOK World Grand Prix 2013	Magdeburg, Germany	TKO	1	2:04
2013-09-07	Win	(Germany) Waldemar Wiebe	Kampfsport Nacht Restart	Leverkusen, Germany	Decision	3	
2013-04-20	Win	(France) Johanes Beausejour	Euskirchener Fight Night	Euskirchen, Germany	KO	4	2:17
2013-?	Loss	(Romania) Barnabas Szücs	Limani Fight Night	Hanau, Germany		5	
2012-10-13	Loss	(Turkey) Atakan Arslan	Night of the Champions	Koblenz, Germany	Decision	5	3:00
For World Martial Arts Organization title
2012-09-08	Loss	(Armenia) Gago Drago	Merseburger Fight Night 5	Merseburg, Germany	Decision	3	3:00
2011-10-22	Win	(Azerbaijan) Xeyal Ehmedov	K1 German League	Herne, Germany	Decision (unanimous)	5	3:00
2011-08-28	Win	(Albania) Alban Ahmeti	Merseburger Fight Night 4	Merseburg, Germany	Decision (unanimous)	3	3:00
2011-08-28	Win	(Slovenia) Egon Racz	Merseburger Fight Night 4	Merseburg, Germany	Ext.R. Decision (unanimous)	3	3:00
2010-11-20	Loss	(Russia) Alisher Hasanov	Born to Fight	Eiskirchen, Germany	Decision	5	3:00
2010-10-02	Win	(Germany) Rene Schick	Night of Champions 2010	Wesseling, Germany	KO	4	
2010-09-05	Win	(Germany) Dima Weimer	Humans Fight Night IV, Final	Hamburg, Germany	Decision (Majority)	3	3:00
Wins Human's Fight Night IV -72.5 kg/160 lb Tournament.
2010-09-05	Win	(Suriname) Marco Piqué	Humans Fight Night IV, Semi Finals	Hamburg, Germany	Decision	3	3:00
2010-09-05	Win	(Thailand) Surnsuk	Humans Fight Night IV, Quarter Finals	Hamburg, Germany	TKO (Referee Stoppage)	2	
2010-04-03	Win	(Austria) Fadi Merza	S-8 Thaiboxing	Wuppertal, Germany	Decision	3	3:00
2009-12-12	Loss	(Germany) Mate Vundac	Backstreet Fights II	Cologne, Germany	Decision (Unanimous)	5	3:00
2009-09-13	Loss	(Russia) Ramil Karmacaev	Humans Fight Night III, Semi Finals	Hamburg, Germany	Decision	3	3:00
2009-09-13	Win	(Germany) Denis Oliwka	Humans Fight Night III, Quarter Finals	Hamburg, Germany	KO	3	2:22
2009-03-27	Win	(Germany) Thilo Schneider	Backstreet Fights	Cologne, Germany	TKO (3 Knockdowns)	2	2:55
2009-02-27	Loss	(Turkey) Adem Bozkurt		Istanbul, Turkey	Decision	3	3:00
2009-?	Win	(Brazil) Hamilton Da Cruz Cardoso	Night of Champions	Wesseling, Germany	TKO (3 Knockdowns)	4	
2008-11-08	Loss	(Sweden) Elias Daniel	KlasH European Elimination 2008, Semi Finals	Hanau, Germany	Decision	3	3:00
2008-11-08	Win	(Germany) Olli Koch	KlasH European Elimination 2008, Quarter Finals	Hanau, Germany	Decision	3	3:00
2008-10-11	Win	(Germany) Ulli Schick	FIGHT THAI BOXING fight 9 World Cup	Dorsten, Germany	KO	1	0:55
2008-05-03	Loss	(Netherlands) Matthias Ibssa		Utrecht, Germany	Decision	5	3:00
2007-10-13	Loss	(Turkey) Ogün Sesli	Euskirchen Fight Night IV	Euskirchen, Germany	Decision		
2007-09-09	Loss	(Netherlands) Nieky Holzken	Ultimate Glory 5	Amersfoort, Netherlands	Decision	3	3:00
2007-06-23	Loss	(Italy) Roberto Cocco	5 Knockout Fight Night, Semi Final	Lucerne, Switzerland	Decision	3	3:00
2007-06-09	Loss	(Germany) Mark Vogel		Duisburg, Germany	Decision	5	3:00
2007-?	Loss	(Albania) Alban Ahmeti		Regensburg, Germany	Decision	5	3:00
For I.S.K.A Welterweight World Champion
2006-11-25	Loss	(Netherlands) Perry Ubeda	Knockin on Heavens Door	Cologne, Germany	TKO		
2006-10-14	Loss	(Netherlands) Alviar Lima		Germany	Decision	5	3:00
2006-09-16	Win	(Cuba) Alfredo Limonta		Istanbul, Turkey	Decision	3	3:00
2006-09-15	Loss	(Turkey) Yavuz Oezden	A-1 Heat 2	Istanbul, Turkey	Ext.R. Decision	5	3:00
2006-06-06	Win	(Turkey) Serkan Yılmaz		Turkey	Ext.R. Decision	4	3:00
2006-05-06	Win	Dimar Weimar	Euskirchen Fight Night	Euskirchen, Germany			
Wins Euskirchen Fight Night 70kg Tournament.
2006-05-06	Win	Denis Dukanov	Euskirchen Fight Night	Euskirchen, Germany			
2006-05-06	Win	Ozecan Buwz	Euskirchen Fight Night	Euskirchen, Germany			
2004-11-20	Loss	(Albania) Mirdi Limani		Hanau, Germany	Decision	5	3:00
For World Martial Arts Organization title -67kg
2004-04-24	Loss	(France) Farid Villaume	European Muaythai Championship, Final	Woippy, France	TKO (2 Knockdowns)	2	
2004-03-20	Loss	(Belarus) Andrei Kotsur		Germany	KO	4	
2004-03-06	Win	(Bulgaria) Dimitar Iliev	Woippy 2004 Championnat d'Europe	Woippy, France	Decision	5	3:00
2004-02-29	Loss	(England) George Pattison	Southern Kickboxing Promotions	Kent, United Kingdom	Decision (split)		
For vacant WKU European Super-Welterweight title
2003-06-28	Loss	(France) Farid Villaume	European Muaythai Championship, 2nd Round	Aubagne, France	KO	1	
2003-03-29	Win	(Czech Republic) Martin Karaivanov	Championnat d'Europe de Muay Thai	Paris, France	Decision	5	3:00
2002-10-30	Loss	(Thailand) Sakmongkol Sithchuchok		Abu Dhabi, UAE	Decision (unanimous)	3	
2002-10-30	Win	(Senegal) Ibrahim Camara		Abu Dhabi, UAE	Decision (unanimous)	3	
2002-09-14	Loss	(Belarus) Vasily Shish	Knight of the KO	Sopot, Poland	KO	3	
2002-06-?	Loss	(Turkey) Ali Gunyar					
For W.F.C.A. Full-Contact world title -76.2 kg.
?	Loss	(Germany) Albert Zimmerman			Decision	3	3:00
?	Win	(Turkey) Tefik Sucu			Decision	5	3:00
?	?	(Germany) Alex Vogel			Decision	3	3:00
Legend: Win Loss Draw/No contest Notes

== Boxing record ==
40 wins (27 knockouts, 17 Losses, 4 Draws
Res.	Record	Opponent	Type	Rd., Time	Date	Location	Notes							
Loss	40-18-4	(France) Michel Mothmora	TKO	6 (12)	2015-03-27	(France) Salle du Lièvre d’Or, Loiret	For vacant World Boxing Federation Intercontinental (WBF) middleweight title							
Loss	40-17-4	(Germany) Tyron Zeuge	KO	9 (10)	2014-08-16	(Germany) Messehalle, Erfurt, Thüringen	For vacant IBF International super middleweight title							
Win	40-16-4	(Germany) Remo Arns	PTS	4	2014-08-02	(Germany) Gym 80, Koblenz, Rheinland-Pfalz								
Loss	39-16-4	(Poland) Przemyslaw Opalach	UD	10	2014-04-05	COS, ul. Moniuszki 22, Giżycko, Poland	For vacant WBC Baltic Silver super middleweight title							
Win	39-15-4	(Germany) Remo Arns	RTD	3 (4)	2014-03-15	(Germany) Energy Gym, Euskirchen, Nordrhein-Westfalen								
Loss	38-15-4	(Kazakhstan) Dimitri Sartison	KO	2 (6)	2013-08-24	(Germany) Warsteiner Hockeypark, Moenchengladbach, Nordrhein-Westfalen								
Win	38-14-4	(Germany) Remo Arns	TKO	3 (8)	2013-06-15	(Germany) Altes Hallenbad, Hameln, Niedersachsen								
Loss	37-14-4	(United Kingdom) George Groves	TKO	2 (8)	2013-03-23	(Germany) GETEC Arena, Magdeburg, Sachsen-Anhalt								
Win	37-13-4	(Turkey) Sabri Ulas Goecmen	TKO	2 (8)	2013-03-02	(Germany) Jahn-Turnhalle, Worms, Rheinland-Pfalz								
Loss	36-13-4	(United Kingdom) Scott Dixon	SD	12	2012-08-25	Prembroke Arena, Prembroke, Malta	Loses World Boxing Union (German Version) super middleweight title							
Loss	36-12-4	(Spain) Marcos Nader	UD	10	2012-02-25	(Germany) Porsche-Arena, Stuttgart, Baden-Württemberg								
Win	36-11-4	(Armenia) Khoren Gevor	PTS	6	2011-12-10	(Germany) Sommer-Rodelbahn, Mechernich, Nordrhein-Westfalen								
Win	35-11-4	(Russia) Amir Hacimuradov	TKO	3 (8)	2011-11-19	(Germany) JStadthalle, Neuwied, Rheinland-Pfalz								
Win	34-11-4	(Turkey) Sabri Ulas Goecmen	RTD	2 (10)	2011-11-09	(Germany) Energy Gym, Euskirchen, Nordrhein-Westfalen								
Win	33-11-4	(Germany) Denis Tykanov	TKO	3 (8)	2011-11-01	(Germany) Zitty-Forum, Euskirchen, Nordrhein-Westfalen								
Win	32-11-4	(Morocco) Mounir Toumi	RTD	2 (10)	2011-10-28	(Germany) Casino, Erfstadt, Nordrhein-Westfalen								
Yes	31-11-4	(Germany) Turgay Uzun	TKO	2 (12)	2011-10-01	(Germany) Kronenbusch Halle, Wesseling, Nordrhein-Westfalen	Wins vacant World Boxing Union (German Version) super middleweight title							
Win	30-11-4	(Germany) Remo Arns	PTS	6	2011-09-24	(Germany) Heinrich-Gerlach-Halle, Bad Münstereifel, Nordrhein-Westfalen								
Win	29-11-4	(Germany) Achmed Kodar	PTS	8	2011-09-17	(Germany) Casino, Erfstadt, Nordrhein-Westfalen								
Win	28-11-4	(Germany) Michael Gensing	PTS	6	2011-08-20	(Germany) Energy Gym, Euskirchen, Nordrhein-Westfalen								
Win	27-11-4	(Russia) Vadim Lebedev	TKO	4 (6)	2011-08-10	(Germany) Vital-Gym, Weilersist, Nordrhein-Westfalen								
Win	26-11-4	(Morocco) Chauki Harnasi	PTS	6	2011-08-06	(Germany) Vital-Gym, Weilersist, Nordrhein-Westfalen								
Win	25-11-4	(Germany) Denis Tykanov	PTS	6	2011-08-03	(Germany) Vital-Gym, Weilersist, Nordrhein-Westfalen								
Win	24-11-4	(Germany) Acun Fewen	TKO	1 (8)	2011-07-24	(Germany) Energy Gym, Euskirchen, Nordrhein-Westfalen								
Win	23-11-4	(Germany) Ilhan Oezem	TKO	1 (8)	2011-07-17	(Germany) Energy Gym, Euskirchen, Nordrhein-Westfalen								
Win	22-11-4	(Germany) Frank Borchert	TKO	5 (6)	2011-06-23	(Germany) Butan Gym, Wuppertal, Nordrhein-Westfalen								
Win	21-11-4	(Romania) Constantin Stavre	TKO	4 (8)	2011-06-04	(Germany) Energy Gym, Euskirchen, Nordrhein-Westfalen								
Win	20-11-4	(Germany) Aras Taalo	TKO	6 (8)	2011-05-14	(Germany) JS-Wenau-Halle, Heistern, Nordrhein-Westfalen								
Loss	19-11-4	(Germany) Manuel Faisst	TKO	3 (4)	2011-05-07	(Germany) Stadthalle, Neuwied, Rheinland-Pfalz								
Win	19-10-4	(Germany) Frank Borchert	TKO	3 (8)	2011-03-26	(Germany) Energy Gym, Euskirchen, Nordrhein-Westfalen								
Win	18-10-4	(Romania) Constantin Stavre	PTS	6	2011-03-12	(Germany) Energy Gym, Euskirchen, Nordrhein-Westfalen								
Win	17-10-4	(Germany) Achmed Kodar	PTS	6	2011-03-05	(Germany) Barakat Fight Gym, Solingen, Nordrhein-Westfalen								
Win	16-10-4	(Germany) Marc Kuntz	TKO	2 (6)	2011-02-27	(Germany) MTK Boxing Gym, Aachen, Nordrhein-Westfalen								
Win	15-10-4	(Morocco) Mounir Toumi	PTS	6	2011-02-26	(Germany) Tai-Kien Gym, Aachen, Nordrhein-Westfalen								
Win	14-10-4	(Germany) Michael Gensing	TKO	3 (8)	2010-12-31	(Germany) Fightclub Panther Gym, Cologne, Nordrhein-Westfalen								
Win	13-10-4	(Germany) Arthur Grzeschik	TKO	2 (6)	2010-12-18	(Germany) Energy Gym, Euskirchen, Nordrhein-Westfalen								
Loss	12-10-4	(Turkey) Yavuz Ertuerk	PTS	8	2010-11-28	(Germany) Energy Gym, Euskirchen, Nordrhein-Westfalen								
Win	12-9-4	(Germany) Acun Fewen	TKO	6 (8)	2010-08-28	(Germany) Energy Gym, Euskirchen, Nordrhein-Westfalen								
win	11-9-4	(Germany) Denis Tykanov	PTS	6	2010-07-17	(Germany) Energy Gym, Euskirchen, Nordrhein-Westfalen								
Win	10-9-4	(Germany) Michael Gensing	TKO	2 (8)	2010-07-11	(Germany) Energy Gym, Euskirchen, Nordrhein-Westfalen								
Win	9-9-4	(Germany) Patrick Baumann	TKO	4 (8)	2010-07-01	(Germany) JS-Wenau-Halle, Heistern, Nordrhein-Westfalen								
Loss	8-9-4	(Germany) Michel Trabant	UD	6	2010-04-18	(Germany) Altes Funkwerk, Koepenick, Berlin								
Loss	8-8-4	(Germany) Cagri Ermis	MD	12	2010-03-13	(Germany) JS-Wenau-Halle, Heistern, Nordrhein-Westfalen								
Loss	8-7-4	(Poland) Daniel Urbanski	UD	8	2010-03-06	Spodek, Katowice, Poland								
Win	8-6-4	(Russia) Vadim Lebedev	TKO	8	2009-12-05	(Germany) Sommer-Rodelbahn, Mechernich, Nordrhein-Westfalen								
Win	7-6-4	(Serbia) Mihalj Halas	KO	1 (6)	2009-11-21	(Germany) Aachen, Nordrhein-Westfalen								
Loss	6-6-4	(Germany) Nick Klappert	PTS	8	2009-11-13	(United States) EKZ "Helle Mitte", Marzahn-Hellersdorf, Berlin								
Draw	6-5-4	(Italy) Fabio Liggieri	PTS	8	2009-09-05	(Germany) Flughafen Merzbrueck, Aachen, Nordrhein-Westfalen								
Win	6-5-3	(Turkey) Guekkan Acar	TKO	9 (10)	2009-08-08	(Germany) Energy Gym, Euskirchen, Nordrhein-Westfalen								
Draw	5-5-3	(Iraq) Koko Murat	PTS	8	2009-05-30	(United States) Daimler Benz Niederlassung, Aachen, Nordrhein-Westfalen								
Win	5-5-2	(Bosnia and Herzegovina) Fikret Cikaric	KO	2 (4)	2009-01-17	(Germany) Sportpark Weissenthurm, Weissenthurm, Rheinland-Pfalz								
Win	4-5-2	(Germany) Agit Elmas	TKO	4 (8)	2008-11-29	(Germany) Sportanlage JS-Wenau, Aachen, Nordrhein-Westfalen								
Loss	3-5-2	(Armenia) Roman Aramyan	UD	6	2008-11-22	(Germany) Stadthalle, Westerburg, Rheinland-Pfalz								
Draw	3-4-2	(Albania) Fatjon Murati	PTS	4	2008-10-18	(Germany) Boxfabrik, Munich, Bayern								
Loss	3-4-1	(Kazakhstan) Andreas Reimer	TKO	7 (12)	2008-05-10	(Germany) Walter Kolb Halle, Bremerhaven, Bremen	For vacant Global Boxing Council Intercontinental light middleweight title	Win	3-3-1	(Germany) Ommid Mostaghim	PTS	8	2007-08-25	(Germany) Museum Ludwig Forum, Aachen, Nordrhein-Westfalen
Win	2-3-1	(Russia) Vadim Lebedev	PTS	4	2007-08-11	(Germany) Energy Gym, Euskirchen, Nordrhein-Westfalen								
Loss	1-3-1	(Germany) Nico Schoepf	TKO	1 (4)	2007-03-10	(Germany) SAP-Arena, Mannheim, Baden-Württemberg								
Loss	1–2-1	(Russia) Ramzan Adaev	TKO	2 (4)	2006-12-02	(Germany) IFCO Arena, Koepenick, Berlin								
Win	1–1-1	(Netherlands) Remy van Rees	TKO	1 (4)	2006-11-19	(Germany) Cologne, Nordrhein-Westfalen								
Draw	0–1-1	(Germany) Sebastian Mollner	PTS	4	2006-03-25	(Germany) Dreifachhalle, Drochtersen, Niedersachsen								
Loss	0–1	(Hungary) Vilmos Balog	TKO	3 (6)	2006-01-05	(Germany) Alabama Club, Munich, Bayern	Professional boxing debut							

== Championships and awards ==
=== Boxing ===
- World Boxing Union
  - World Boxing Union (German Version) super middleweight Champion

=== Kickboxing ===
- Human Fight Night
  - Humans Fight Night IV 2010 Tournament Champion
