= Farid Villaume =

- Born: February 10, 1975 (age 51)
- Nationality: (France) French
- Height: 1.80 m (5 ft 11 in)
- Weight: 72.0 kg (158.7 lb; 11.34 st)
- Division: Welterweight
- Style: Muay Thai
- Fighting out of: Le Mée-sur-Seine, France
- Team: Le Mée Sports Muaythaï "Team Bilos"
- Trainer: Nicolas Subileau
- Years active: 20 (1991–present)

Kickboxing record
- Total: 53
- Wins: 40
- Losses: 11
- By knockout: 3
- Draws: 2
- Last updated on: November 22, 2012

Farid Villaume (born February 10, 1975), is a French Muay Thai kickboxer, having won world titles in different boxes fists feet.

== Life and career ==
Villaume stands at 180 cm for 72 kg. Father of Corsican and Moroccan mother, he has been training Muay Thai since the age of 16.

His career counts more than 50 fights, 10 defeats and 2 draws. Farid Villaume fought in Muay Thai and kickboxing.

After two years out of the ring, Villaume returned to face Antuan Siangboxing at Best of Siam 2 in Paris on November 22, 2012 only to lose on points.

== Titles and achievements ==
=== Professional ===
- World Association of Kickboxing Organizations
  - 2009 WAKO Pro Muay Thai World -72 kg Champion
- World Fights of Kick Boxing
  - 2009 WFKB World -72 kg Champion
- A1 World Combat Cup
  - 2006 A1 World Combat Cup Tournament Winner
- Muay Thai Association
  - 2003 MTA World Champion
- King's Cup
  - 2003 S1 World Tournament Runner-up
- World Muaythai Council
  - 2001 WMC World -66 kg Champion
  - 2004 WMC World -71 kg Champion
- Fédération Française de Kickboxing, Muaythaï et Disciplines Associées
  - 1998 FFKMDA Muaythai Champion
  - 1997 FFKMDA Muaythai Champion

=== Amateur ===
- International Federation of Muaythai Associations
  - 1998 IFMA World Championship Champion
- European Muaythai Federation
  - 2004 EMF -71 kg Champion

== Fight record ==
Kickboxing record
102 Wins (80 (T)KO's), 8 Losses, 2 Draws
Date	Result	Opponent	Event	Location	Method	Round	Time
2012-11-22	Loss	(France) Antuan Siangboxing	Best of Siam 2	Paris, France	Decision	5	3:00
2010-10-15	Win	(France) Moussa Konaté	Maxi Fight 2	Stade de l'Est, Réunion	Decision	5	3:00
2010-02-26	Loss	(Thailand) Saiyok Pumpanmuang	Lumpinee Stadium	Bangkok, Thailand	Decision (Unanimous)	5	3:00
For the inaugural Lumpinee Stadium Super-welterweight (154 lb) title.
2009-11-14	Loss	(France) Abdallah Mabel	La Nuit des Champions 2009	Marseille, France	Decision	5	3:00
Fight was for "Nuit des Champions" Muaythai belt -73 kg.
2009-07-11	Win	(Italy) Fabio Siciliani	Diamond Fight World Tour 2	Marrakesh, Morocco	TKO (Body kick)	2	
Retains WFKB World Muaythai title and Wins WAKO Pro World Muaythai title.
2009-06-20	Win	(France) Johann Fauveau	Gala de Levallois	Levallois-Perret, France	Decision	5	3:00
2009-05-16	Win	(Turkey) Ali Gunyar	Légendes et Guerriers	Toulouse, France	Forfeit		
Wins WFKB World Muaythai title (-72 kg).
2009-01-17	Win	(Thailand) Sayfa Sitpordam	Muaythai in Hall Rhénus	Strasbourg, France	TKO (Throw in the towel)	2	
2008-12-20	Loss	(Thailand) Lamsongkram Chuwattana	Boxe-Thai Guinea Tournament, Semi Final	Malabo, Equatorial Guinea	Decision (Unanimous)	3	3:00
2008-12-20	Win	(Cameroon) Mbanda Nou Bissier	Boxe-Thai Guinea Tournament, Quarter Final	Malabo, Equatorial Guinea	TKO (Referee Stoppage)	1	
2008-11-06	Win	(Thailand) Kapapeth	Muaythai in Levallois	Levallois-Perret, France	TKO (Referee Stoppage)	1	
2008-06-20	Loss	(Thailand) Lamsongkram Chuwattana	International Muay Thai Fight Night	Montego Bay, Jamaica	Decision	5	3:00
Fight was for WBC Middleweight title (-72.500 kg).
2008-03-02	Loss	(Turkey) Ali Gunyar	SLAMM "Nederland vs Thailand IV"	Almere, Netherlands	Decision	5	3:00
2007-11-29	Loss	(Thailand) Yodsanklai Fairtex	France vs Thailand	Paris, France	TKO (Referee stoppage)	3	
2007-06-28	Win	(Thailand) Nonthanun Por. Pramuk	K-1 World MAX 2007 World Tournament Final Elimination	Tokyo, Japan	Decision (Unanimous)	3	3:00
2007-06-16	Win	(Thailand) Samkor Kiatmontep	The Night of the Superfights VIII	Paris, France	TKO (Referee Stoppage)	4	
2007-05-30	Draw	(Thailand) Yodsanklai Fairtex	France vs Thailand	Paris, France	Decision draw	5	3:00
2006-12-17	Win	(France) Yohan Lidon	A-1 World Combat Cup, Final	Turkey	Decision	5	3:00
Wins A1 World Combat Cup title.
2006-10-21	Win	(France) Abdallah Mabel	A-1 World Combat Cup, Semi Final	Istanbul, Turkey	KO	2	
2006-10-17	Win	(Portugal) José Reis	A-1 World Combat Cup, Quarter Final	Istanbul, Turkey	Decision	5	3:00
2006-09-21	Win	(France) Eddy Saban	A-1 World Combat Cup, Final 16	Ankara, Turkey	KO	1	
2006-09-09	Win	(France) Fabrice Acosta	A-1 World Combat Cup, Group Stage	Antalya, Turkey	TKO (Knee)		
2006-04-08	Win	(Belgium) Jan Van Denderen	The Night of the Superfights IV	Paris, France	TKO (Corner Stoppage)		
2006-01-14	Win	(Philippines) Ole Laursen	The Night of the Superfights III	Villebon-sur-Yvette, France	KO	2	
2005-05-28	Win	(Japan) Ryuji Goto	World Championship in Aubagne	Aubagne, France	Decision (Unanimous)	5	3:00
Retains WMC World Muaythai title.
2005-02-23	Win	(Japan) Toshiyuki Kinami	K-1 World MAX 2005 Japan Tournament	Tokyo, Japan	Ext R. Decision (Unanimous)	4	3:00
2004-11-27	Win	(Thailand) Wanlop Sitpholek	World Championship in Woippy	Woippy, France	Decision (Unanimous)	5	3:00
Wins WMC World Muaythai title.
2004-09-25	Win	(France) Sofiane Allouache	Gala in Le Zénith	Paris, France	TKO (2 Knockdowns)	1	
2004-04-24	Win	(Syria) Baker Barakat	European Muaythai Championship, Final	Woippy, France	TKO (2 Knockdowns)	2	
Wins EMT European Muaythai title (-71 kg).
2004-03-06	Win	(Netherlands) Youssef Akhnik	European Muaythai Championship, 3rd Round	Woippy, France	TKO (Referee Stoppage)	3	
2003-12-05	Loss	(Thailand) Suriya Prasathinphimai	King's Birthday : S1 World Championships, Final	Sanam Luang, Thailand	Decision	3	3:00
Fight was for 1st tournament of S1 World Championship.
2003-12-05	Win	(Thailand) Munkong Kiatsomkuan	King's Birthday : S1 World Championships, Semi Final	Sanam Luang, Thailand	KO (Left Cross)	3	
2003-12-05	Win	(Thailand) Nuengtrakan Por Muang-Ubon	King's Birthday : S1 World Championships, Quarter Final	Sanam Luang, Thailand	KO (Left Cross)	3	
2003-11-08	Win	(Thailand) Sakmongkol Sithchuchok	Muaythai Gala in Trieste	Trieste, Italy	Decision (Unanimous)	5	3:00
Wins MTA World Muaythai title.
2003-00-00	Win	(Syria) Baker Barakat	European Muaythai Championship, 2nd Round	Aubagne, France	KO	3	
2003-03-29	Win	(Portugal) Joao Diago	European Muaythai Championship, 1st Round	Paris, France	Decision	3	3:00
2002-08-19	Win	(Thailand) Orono Por Muang Ubon	Queen's Birthday event	Sukhothai Province, Thailand	Decision	5	3:00
Wins WMTC World Muaythai title (-66.600 kg).
2002-06-08	Win	(Thailand) Saimai Chor Suananun	Titans du 3ème Millénaire	Lyon, France	KO	3	
2002-04-08	Win	(Thailand) Taweesab Sitsaengorun	Muaythai Event in Thailand	Thailand	KO	3	
2002-02-16	Win	(Thailand) Mangonjuk	Muaythai Gala in Salle Japy	Paris, France	TKO	3	
2001-04-08	Win	(Thailand) Taweesab Sitsanarun	Onesongchai	Bangkok, Thailand	KO (Left hook)	3	
2001-02-03	Win	(Thailand) Sakhetdao K.T. Gym	Muaythai Gala in Salle Japy	Paris, France	KO (Highkick)	2	
2000-04-08	Win	(Thailand) Sittichok Lukprabaht	French National Championship	Paris, France	KO	2	
1999-11-20	Win	(Italy) Antonio Sconaniglio	French National Championship	Paris, France	KO	2	
1999-08-12	Win	(Thailand) Vihoknoi Sit Theppituk	Queen's Birthday	Bangkok, Thailand	Decision	5	3:00
1999-06-12	Loss	(Thailand) Chalunlap Kiatprachanchai	French National Championship Finals	Paris, France	TKO	2	
1999-04-03	Win	(Netherlands) Ridouan El Assrouti	French National Championship	Paris, France	KO	2	
1998-	Win	(France) Samir Djeffali	French National Championship, Final	Paris, France	KO (Left hook)	2	
Wins 1998 France National Championship.
Legend: Win Loss Draw/No contest Notes

== See also ==
- List of male kickboxers
