= Mirdi Limani =

Albanian former kickboxer (born 1975)

- Born: July 8, 1975 (age 51); Struga, SR Macedonia, SFR Yugoslavia
- Nationality: (Albania) Albanian
- Height: 1.75 m (5 ft 9 in)
- Weight: 67.0 kg (147.7 lb; 10.55 st)
- Division: Welterweight
- Style: Kickboxing
- Fighting out of: Frankfurt, Germany
- Team: Limani Gym

Kickboxing record
- Total: 65
- Wins: 64
- Losses: 0
- Draws: 1

Mirdi Limani (born July 8, 1975) is an Albanian former kickboxer who competed in the welterweight division. He went undefeated in his career, holding four world titles.

== Career ==
Limani, an Albanian Macedonian, emigrated to Germany and won the WKA German Championship in 1997. He then became the WKA's title holder at the European and intercontinental level before beating Chakuriki Gym fighter Rachid el Haddad for the world title on June 6, 2001, in Fulda, Germany.

He would then also win world titles under the lightly-regarded WTKL and WMAO organizations in 2003 and 2004, respectively.

He became a four-time world champion on October 14, 2006 when he defeated Fernado Calleros of the United States on points to take the ISKA World Welterweight (66.8 kg/147 lb) Freestyle Championship in Frankfurt, Germany.

== Championships and awards ==
=== Kickboxing ===
- International Sport Karate Association
  - ISKA World Welterweight (66.8 kg/147 lb) Freestyle Championship
- World Kickboxing Association
  - WKA German Championship
  - WKA Interim German Championship
  - WKA European Championship
  - WKA Intercontinental Championship
  - WKA World Championship
- World Martial Arts Organization
  - WMAO World 67 kg/147 lb Championship
- World Thai Kickboxing League
  - WTKL World Championship

== Kickboxing record ==
Kickboxing record
64 wins, 0 losses, 1 draw
Date	Result	Opponent	Event	Location	Method	Round	Time
2006-10-14	Win	(United States) Fernando Calleros		Frankfurt, Germany	Decision	5	3:00
Wins the ISKA World Welterweight (66.8 kg/147 lb) Freestyle Championship.
2004-11-20	Win	(Syria) Baker Barakat		Hanau, Germany	Decision	5	3:00
Defends the WMAO World 67 kg/147 lb Championship.
2002-11-30	Win	Hanas Grish		Hanau, Germany	TKO (corner stoppage)		
Defends the WKA World Championship.
2002-07-27	Win	(Czech Republic) Michael Hansgut		Tetovo, Macedonia	TKO (retirement)		
Defends the WKA World Championship.
2001-06-16	Win	(Netherlands) Rachid el Haddad		Fulda, Germany	Decision	5	3:00
Wins the WKA World Championship.
Legend: Win Loss Draw/No contest Notes
