= Asnières, Eure =

Asnières
- Commune
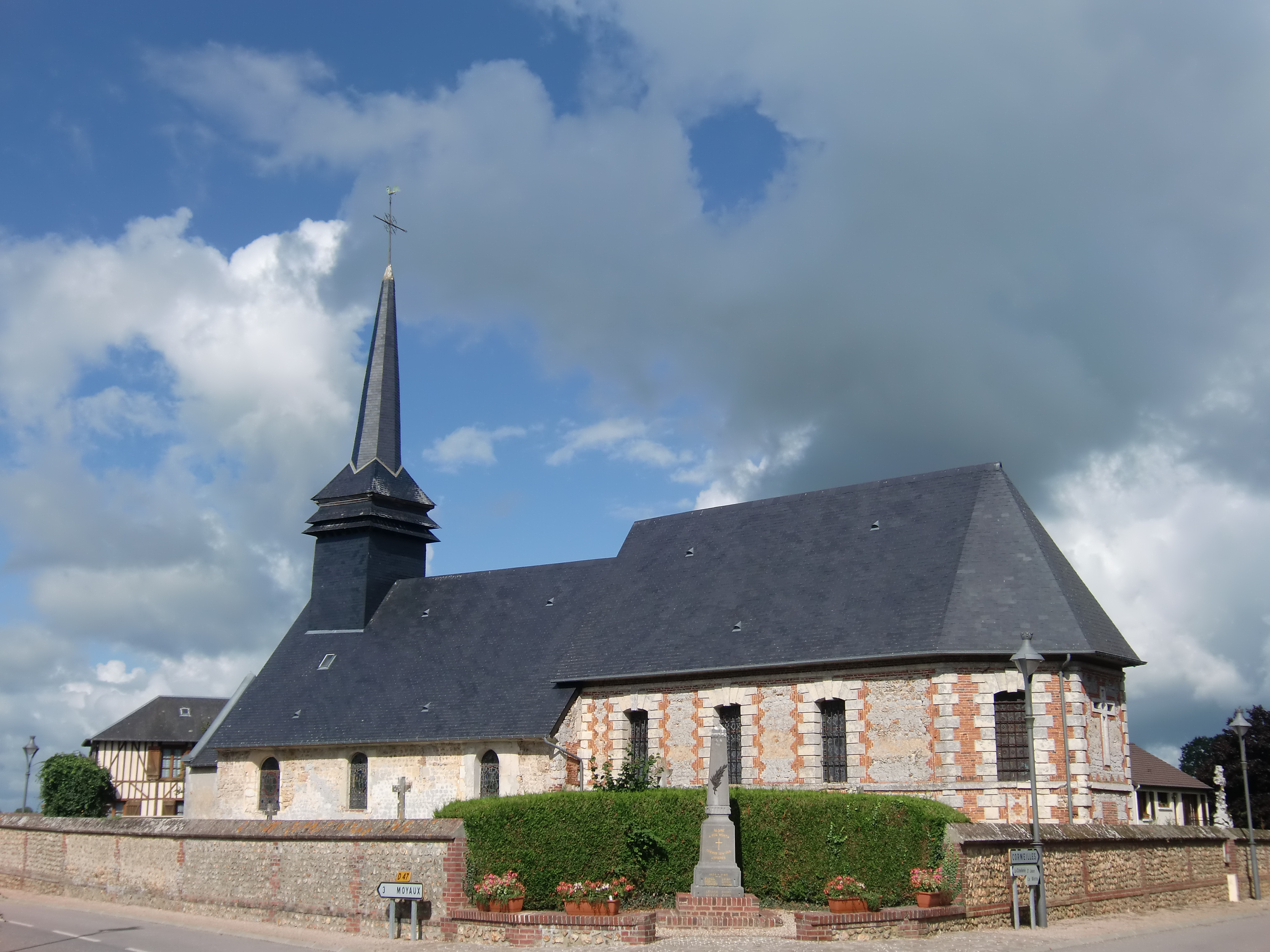
- The church in Asnières
- Location of Asnières
- Location within France Location within Normandy
- Coordinates: 49°11′47″N 0°23′57″E
- Country: France
- Region: Normandy
- Department: Eure
- Arrondissement: Bernay
- Canton: Beuzeville
- Intercommunality: CC Lieuvin Pays Auge

Government
  - Mayor (2020–2026): Emmanuelle Viquesnel
- Area^{1}: 8.14 km^{2} (3.14 sq mi)
- Elevation: 152 m (499 ft)
- Highest elevation: 162 m (531 ft)
- Lowest elevation: 76 m (249 ft)
- Population (2023): 335
  - Density: 41.2/km^{2} (107/sq mi)
- Time zone: UTC+01:00 (CET)
  - Summer (DST): UTC+02:00 (CEST)
- INSEE/Postal code: 27021 /27260
- ^{1} French Land Register data, which excludes lakes, ponds, glaciers > 1 km^{2} (0.386 sq mi or 247 acres) and river estuaries.

Asnières (French pronunciation: [ɑnjɛʁ]) is a commune in the Eure department in Normandy in northern France.

== Population ==
Historical population
Year	Pop.	±% p.a.
1968	308	—
1975	218	−4.82%
1982	217	−0.07%
1990	201	−0.95%
1999	216	+0.80%
2007	247	+1.69%
2012	311	+4.72%
2017	320	+0.57%
2023	335	+0.77%
Source: INSEE

== See also ==
- Communes of the Eure department
