= Fairtex =

Sport wearing

FAIRTEX
- FAIRTEX® Logo
- Type: Private
- Industry: Muay Thai, Kickboxing Brand, Brazilian jiujitsu, Mixed martial arts
- Founded: 1958; 68 years ago in Bangkok, Thailand
- Founder: Banjong Busarakamwong; Ariyawat Busarakamwong (present)
- Headquarters: Bang Lamung District, Pattaya, Thailand
- Area served: Worldwide
- Products: Martial arts equipment, sporting equipment, clothing, accessories
- Services: Manufacturer, fighter management
- Website: fairtex.com

Fairtex is a Thai Muay Thai, Boxing, Mixed Martial Arts and clothing brand that was founded by Bunjong Busarakamwongs (better known as Mr. Philip Wong) in Bangkok, Thailand in 1958. Fairtex won the Best MMA gloves Award at World MMA Awards in 2008. Fairtex is the official gloves partner of ONE Championship events since 2010 to present.

Fairtex is now headed by Mr. Philip Wong's son, Prem Busarabavonwongs at the brand's headquarters located in Pattaya, also the location of the Fairtex Training Center.

== See also ==
- Mixed martial arts clothing
- Fairtex Gym
- List of fitness wear brands
- List of companies of Thailand
