= Saint-Fons =

- Commune
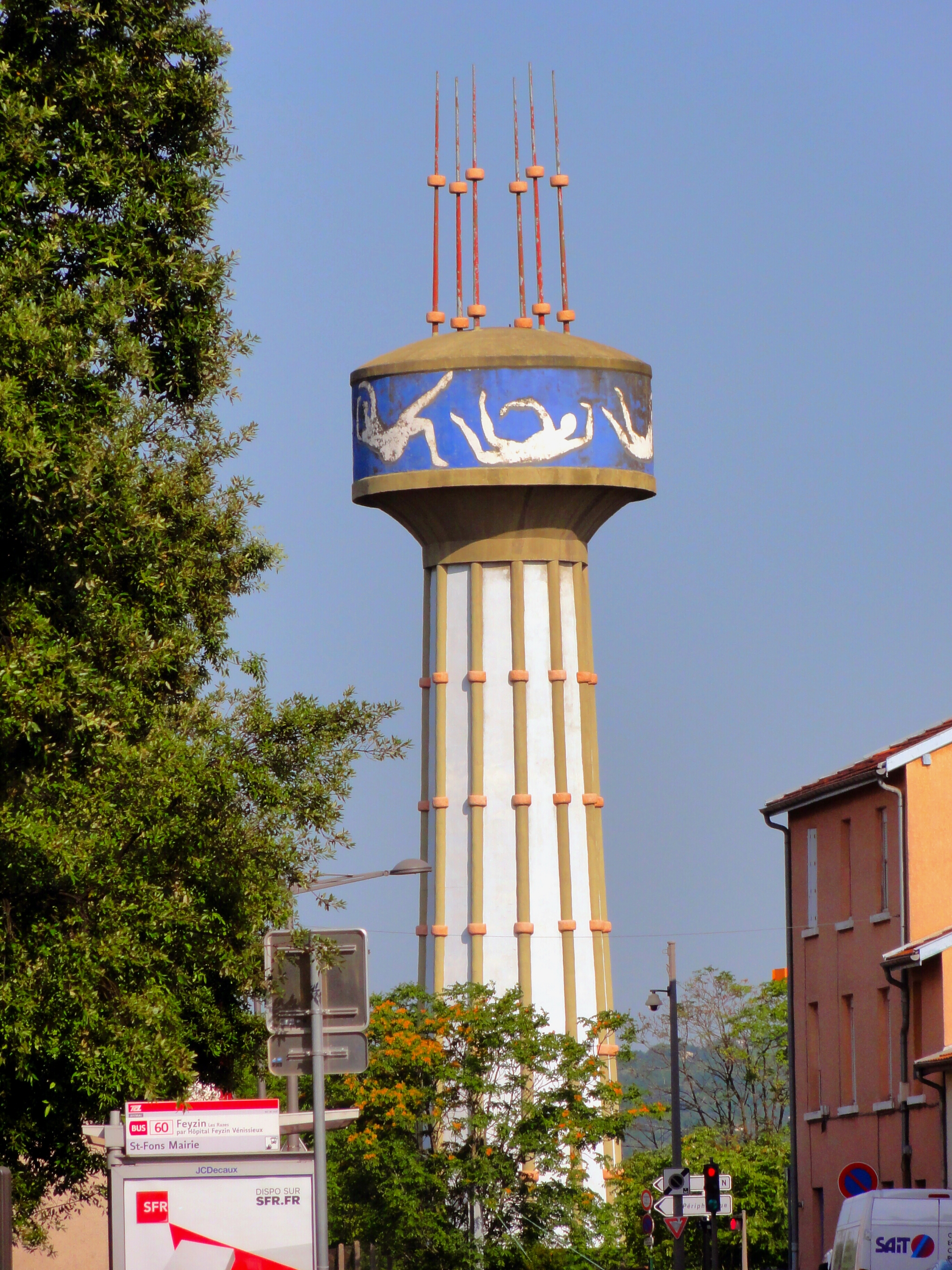
- The water tower

- Coat of arms
- Location of Saint-Fons
- Location within France Location within Auvergne-Rhône-Alpes
- Coordinates: 45°42′32″N 4°51′11″E
- Country: France
- Region: Auvergne-Rhône-Alpes
- Metropolis: Lyon Metropolis
- Arrondissement: Lyon

Government
  - Mayor (2020–2026): Christian Duchêne
- Area^{1}: 6.06 km^{2} (2.34 sq mi)
- Elevation: 165 m (541 ft)
- Highest elevation: 220 m (720 ft)
- Lowest elevation: 155 m (509 ft)
- Population (2023): 19,285
  - Density: 3,180/km^{2} (8,240/sq mi)
- Time zone: UTC+01:00 (CET)
  - Summer (DST): UTC+02:00 (CEST)
- INSEE/Postal code: 69199 /69190
- ^{1} French Land Register data, which excludes lakes, ponds, glaciers > 1 km^{2} (0.386 sq mi or 247 acres) and river estuaries.

Saint-Fons (French pronunciation: [sɛ̃ fɔ̃]; Arpitan: Cent-Fonts, [sã fɔ̃]) is a commune in the Metropolis of Lyon, Auvergne-Rhône-Alpes, eastern France. It was created in 1888 from part of the commune of Vénissieux.

== Population ==
Historical population

Year	Pop.	±% p.a.
1891	4,060	—
1896	4,160	+0.49%
1901	4,982	+3.67%
1906	5,325	+1.34%
1911	6,018	+2.48%
1921	7,248	+1.88%
1926	9,362	+5.25%
1931	10,660	+2.63%
1936	10,443	−0.41%
1946	10,607	+0.16%
1954	11,100	+0.57%

Year	Pop.	±% p.a.
1962	13,067	+2.06%
1968	15,096	+2.43%
1975	17,144	+1.83%
1982	15,291	−1.62%
1990	15,735	+0.36%
1999	15,671	−0.05%
2007	16,964	+1.00%
2012	17,463	+0.58%
2017	18,802	+1.49%
2023	19,285	+0.42%

Source: EHESS and INSEE (1968-2023)

== See also ==
- Communes of the Metropolis of Lyon
