= Villebon =

- Commune
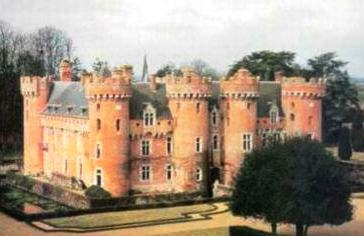
- Chateau
- Location of Villebon
- Location within France Location within Centre-Val de Loire
- Coordinates: 48°23′30″N 1°12′26″E
- Country: France
- Region: Centre-Val de Loire
- Department: Eure-et-Loir
- Arrondissement: Chartres
- Canton: Illiers-Combray

Government
  - Mayor (2020–2026): Patrick Pétrement
- Area^{1}: 2.16 km^{2} (0.83 sq mi)
- Elevation: 180 m (590 ft)
- Highest elevation: 212 m (696 ft)
- Lowest elevation: 182 m (597 ft)
- Population (2023): 53
  - Density: 25/km^{2} (64/sq mi)
- Time zone: UTC+01:00 (CET)
  - Summer (DST): UTC+02:00 (CEST)
- INSEE/Postal code: 28414 /28190
- ^{1} French Land Register data, which excludes lakes, ponds, glaciers > 1 km^{2} (0.386 sq mi or 247 acres) and river estuaries.

Villebon (French pronunciation: [vilbɔ̃]) is a commune in the department of Eure-et-Loir in northern France

The inhabitants are called Villebonnais.

== Population ==
Historical population
Year	Pop.	±% p.a.
1968	47	—
1975	65	+4.74%
1982	45	−5.12%
1990	45	+0.00%
1999	72	+5.36%
2007	85	+2.10%
2012	70	−3.81%
2017	76	+1.66%
2023	53	−5.83%
Source: INSEE

== Personalities ==
- Maximilien de Béthune, duc de Sully

== See also ==
- Communes of the Eure-et-Loir department
