= 2016 in Kunlun Fight =

Information
- First date: January 9
- Last date: December 15

Events
- Total events: 23

The year 2016 was the 3rd year in the history of the Kunlun Fight, a kickboxing promotion based in China. 2016 started with Kunlun Fight 36.

The events were broadcasts through television agreements in mainland China with Jiangsu TV and around the world with various other channels. The events were also streamed live on the Kunlun Fight app. Traditionally, most Kunlun Fight events have both tournament fights and superfights (single fights).

== Champions ==
Weight	Name	Event	Date	Notes
MMA Welterweight	(China) Sai Wang def. Sergey Proskuriakov	Kunlun Fight 36	January 9, 2016	MMA Title Fight
Kickboxing 75 kg	(China) Zhaoyu Zheng def. Yang Zhang (final) def. Shuo Ma (semifinal) def. Krit (quarterfinal) def. Daniel KwangSoo (Final 16)	Kunlun Fight 41/Kunlun Fight 42/Kunlun Fight 47	July 10, 2016	2016 Multi-Part 16-man World Championship Tournament
Kickboxing 65 kg	(China) Wei Ninghui def. Abdellah Ezbiri (final) def. Meng Guodong (semifinal) def. Craig Dickson (quarterfinal) def. Yosuke Mizuochi (Final 16)	Kunlun Fight 49/Kunlun Fight 51	September 10, 2016	2016 Multi-Part 16-man World Championship Tournament
Kickboxing 95+kg	(Belarus) Andrei Gerasimchuk def. Tsotne Rogava (final) def. Atha Kasapis (semifinal) def. Bruno Susano (quarterfinal)	Kunlun Fight 48/Kunlun Fight 52	September 11, 2016	2016 Multi-part 8-man World Championship Tournament
Muay Thai 70 kg	(Thailand) Buakaw Banchamek def. Dylan Salvador	Kunlun Fight 53	September 24, 2016	70 kg Muay Thai Title Fight
MMA Strawweight	(China) Weili Zhang def. Maria De Souza	Kunlun Fight 53	September 24, 2016	Women's MMA Title Fight
MMA Welterweight	(China) Lipeng Zhang def. Adam Boussif	Kunlun Fight 53	September 24, 2016	MMA Title Fight
Kickboxing 80 kg	(Russia) Alexander Stetsurenko def. Dmitry Valent (final) def. Darryl Sichtman (semifinal) def. Bo Fufan (quarterfinal)	Kunlun Fight 50/Kunlun Fight 55	December 10, 2016	2016 Multi-part 8-man World Championship Tournament
MMA Strawweight	(China) Weili Zhang def. Karla Benitez	Kunlun Fight MMA 7	December 15, 2016	Women's MMA Title Fight
Kickboxing 70 kg	(Thailand) Superbon Banchamek def. Jomthong Chuwattana (final) def. Cedric Manhoef (semifinal) def. Sitthichai Sitsongpeenong (quarterfinal) def. Khayal Dzhaniev (Final 16) def. Martin Gano (32) def. Chen Zhicheng (64)	Kunlun Fight 40/Kunlun Fight 48/Kunlun Fight 53/Kunlun Fight 56	January 1, 2017	2016 Multi-part 64-man World Championship Tournament
Kickboxing 61.5 kg	(Netherlands) Anissa Haddaoui def. Wang Kehan (final)	Kunlun Fight 64	July 15, 2017	Women's 2016 Multi-part Legend of Mulan 8-woman World Championship Tournament. The tournament suffered multiple injury related delays.

== List of events ==
#	Date	Event	Arena	Location
61	December 15, 2016	Kunlun Fight MMA 7	Kunlun Fight World Combat Sports Center	Beijing, China
60	December 10, 2016	Kunlun Fight 55	Guoxin Gymnasium	Qingdao, Shandong, China
59	October 30, 2016	Kunlun Fight 54	Optics Valley International Tennis Center	Hubei, China
58	October 21, 2016	Kunlun Fight - Cage Fight Series 6	Yiwu Meihu Sports Centre	Yiwu, China
57	September 24, 2016	Kunlun Fight 53	Kunlun Fight World Combat Sports Center	Beijing, China
56	September 11, 2016	Kunlun Fight 52	Strait Olympic Sports Center	Fuzhou, China
55	September 10, 2016	Kunlun Fight 51	Strait Olympic Sports Center	Fuzhou, China
54	August 20, 2016	Kunlun Fight 50	Jinan Olympic Sports Center Gymnasium	Jinan, China
53	August 7, 2016	Kunlun Fight 49 / Rebels 45	Ota-City General Gymnasium	Tokyo, Japan
52	July 31, 2016	Kunlun Fight 48	Jining Olympic Sports Center Gymnasium	Jining, China
51	July 10, 2016	Kunlun Fight 47	Wutaishan Sports Center	Nanjing, China
50	June 26, 2016	Kunlun Fight 46	Kunming International Convention and Exhibition Centre Hall 7	Kunming, China
49	June 5, 2016	Kunlun Fight 45	Sichuan Gymnasium	Chengdu, China
48	May 22, 2016	Kunlun Fight - Cage Fight Series 5 / Top FC 11	Olympic Park, Seoul	(South Korea) Seoul, Korea
47	May 14, 2016	Kunlun Fight 44 / MFP: Mayor's Cup 2016	Platinum Arena	Khabarovsk, Russia
46	April 23, 2016	Kunlun Fight 43	Zhoukou Gymnasium	Zhoukou, China
45	April 9, 2016	Kunlun Fight 42	Haihu District Gym Center	Xining, China
44	April 8, 2016	Kunlun Fight 41	Haihu District Gym Center	Xining, China
43	March 25, 2016	Kunlun Fight 40	Tongling Zodiac Park	Tongling, China
42	March 20, 2016	Kunlun Fight 39	Dongguan Stadium	Dongguan, China
41	February 21, 2016	Kunlun Fight 38 / Super Muaythai 2016	Pattaya Indoor Stadium	Pattaya, Thailand
40	January 23, 2016	Kunlun Fight 37	Crown of Beauty Theatre	Sanya, China
39	January 9, 2016	Kunlun Fight 36	Shanghai Oriental Sports Center	Shanghai, China

== Kunlun Fight 36 ==
Kunlun Fight 36
- Promotion: Kunlun Fight
- Date: January 9, 2016
- Venue: Shanghai Oriental Sports Center
- City: Shanghai, China

Event chronology
Kunlun Fight 35	Kunlun Fight 36	Kunlun Fight 37

Kunlun Fight36 was a kickboxing event held by Kunlun Fight on January 9, 2016 at the Shanghai Oriental Sports Center in Shanghai, China.

=== Results ===
Fight Card
Weight Class				Method	Round	Notes
Kickboxing 70 kg	(Thailand) Buakaw Banchamek	def.	(China) Liu Hainan	Decision (unanimous)	3	
MMA 58 kg	(Venezuela) Karla Benitez	vs.	(China) Jin Tang	Draw (Majority)	3	
Kickboxing 70 kg	(Belarus) Dzianis Zuev	def.	(Thailand) Armin Pumpanmuang Windy Sport	Decision (unanimous)	3	
Kickboxing 100+ kg	(United States) Steven Banks	def.	(China) Zou Litao	KO	2	
Kickboxing 67 kg	(South Korea) Lee Sung-Hyun	def.	(China) Gu Hui	Decision (unanimous)	3	
MMA 80 kg	(China) Wang Sai	def.	(Russia) Sergey Proskuriakov	TKO	2	For the Welterweight Championship
Kickboxing 100+ kg	(Ukraine) Roman Kryklia	def.	(Netherlands) Jahfarr Wilnis	Decision (unanimous)	3	
Kickboxing 72.5 kg	(Netherlands) Albert Kraus	def.	(China) Liu Mingzhi	TKO	3	
Kickboxing 60 kg	(China) Cong Wang	def.	(Russia) Svetlana Vinnikova	Decision (unanimous)	3	
Kickboxing 100+ kg	(China) Xiu Pengcheng	def.	(United States) Virgil Zwicker	KO	2	

== Kunlun Fight 37 ==
Kunlun Fight 37
- Promotion: Kunlun Fight
- Date: January 23, 2016
- Venue: Crown of Beauty Theatre
- City: Sanya, China

Event chronology
Kunlun Fight 36	Kunlun Fight 37	Kunlun Fight 38 / Super Muaythai 2016

Kunlun Fight 37 was a kickboxing event held by Kunlun Fight on January 23, 2016 at the Crown of Beauty Theatre in Sanya, China.

=== Results ===
Fight Card
Weight Class				Method	Round	Notes
Kickboxing 70 kg	(Thailand) Sitthichai Sitsongpeenong	def.	(Ukraine) Enriko Gogokhia	Decision (extra round)	4	70 kg World Max 2015 Tournament Final
MMA 75 kg	(China) Zhang Lipeng	def.	(Kazakhstan) Beibit Nazarov (c)	Decision (unanimous)	3	For the Lightweight Championship
Kickboxing 90 kg	(Netherlands) Jason Wilnis	def.	(China) Wang Chongyang	Decision (Majority)	3	
Kickboxing 60 kg	(China) Wang Kehan	def.	(Portugal) Marisa Pires	TKO	2	
Kickboxing 75 kg	(China) Nuerla Mulali	def.	(China) Xu Yongba	Decision (unanimous)	3	
Kickboxing 70 kg	(Russia) Anatoly Moiseev	def.	(Spain) Jonay Risco	Decision (unanimous)	3	
MMA 70 kg	(China) Wu Haotian	def.	(Lithuania) Ramunas Venslovas	KO	1	
Kickboxing 95 kg	(China) Yang Yu	def.	(Slovakia) Ivan Bartek	Decision (unanimous)	3	
Kickboxing 59 kg	(China) Gao Qian	def.	(Netherlands) Martizandra Hersisia	Decision (unanimous)	3	
Kickboxing 70 kg	(Ukraine) Enriko Gogokhia	def.	(Australia) Victor Nagbe	Decision (unanimous)	3	70 kg World Max 2015 Tournament Semifinal 2
Kickboxing 70 kg	(Thailand) Sitthichai Sitsongpeenong	def.	(Thailand) Superbon Banchamek	KO	2	70 kg World Max 2015 Tournament Semifinal 1
Kickboxing 70 kg	(Russia) Dzhabar Askerov	def.	(Thailand) Aikpracha Meenayothin	KO	2	70 kg World Max 2015 Tournament Reserve Fight
Kickboxing 62 kg	(South Korea) Chan Hyung Lee	def.	(China) Jiao Daobo	Decision (unanimous)	3	
Kickboxing 65 kg	(Sweden) Samuel Bark	def.	(China) Bai Lishuai	Decision (unanimous)	3	
Kickboxing 60 kg	(China) Wang Wanben	def.	(France) Celestin Georges Luis	Decision (unanimous)	3	

=== 70kg World Max Tournament 2015 bracket ===
Final 16 feat. in Kunlun Fight 31, 32 & 33
(Romania) Amansio Paraschiv	3r.
(China) Zhang Chunyu	DEC
(Thailand) Superbon Banchamek	KO
(China) Zheng Zhaoyu	2r.
(Spain) Jonay Risco	3r.
(Thailand) Sitthichai Sitsongpeenong	DEC
(Thailand) Yodsanklai Fairtex	DEC
(Russia) Dzhabar Askerov	3r.
(Spain) David Calvo	2r.
(Georgia (country)) Davit Kiria	TKO
(Ukraine) Enriko Gogokhia	DEC
(Australia) Steve Moxon	3r.
(Belarus) Dzianis Zuev	4r.
(Australia) Victor Nagbe	DEC
(China) Kong Lingfeng	DEC
(China) Wu Xuesong	3r.

Quarter-finals feat. in Kunlun Fight 35
(China) Zhang Chunyu	2r.
(Thailand) Superbon Banchamek	KO
(Thailand) Sitthichai Sitsongpeenong	DEC
(Armenia) Marat Grigorian	3r.
(Georgia (country)) Davit Kiria	3r.
(Ukraine) Enriko Gogokhia	DEC
(Australia) Victor Nagbe	DEC
(China) Kong Lingfeng	3r.

Semi-finals
(Thailand) Superbon Banchamek	2r.
(Thailand) Sitthichai Sitsongpeenong	KO
(Ukraine) Enriko Gogokhia	DEC
(Australia) Victor Nagbe	3r.

Final
(Thailand) Sitthichai Sitsongpeenong	DEC
(Ukraine) Enriko Gogokhia	4r.

== Kunlun Fight 38 / Super Muaythai 2016 ==
Kunlun Fight 38 / Super Muaythai 2016
- Promotion: Kunlun Fight / Super Muaythai
- Date: February 21, 2016
- Venue: Pattaya Indoor Stadium
- City: Pattaya, Thailand

Event chronology
Kunlun Fight 37	Kunlun Fight 38 / Super Muaythai 2016	Kunlun Fight 39

Kunlun Fight 38 / Super Muaythai 2016 was a kickboxing event held by Kunlun Fight on February 21, 2016 at the Pattaya Indoor Stadium in Pattaya, Thailand.

=== Results ===
Fight Card
Weight Class				Method	Round	Notes
MMA 70 kg	(Tajikistan) Salim Mukhidinov	def.	(Russia) Evgeniy Ryazanov	Decision		
Kickboxing 72.5 kg	(Netherlands) Trirat Sangjan	def.	(France) Sofian Seboussi	Decision (Majority)	3	
Kickboxing 70 kg	(Russia) Khayal Dzhaniev	def.	(Thailand) Changpuak Jetsada Pongtong	Decision (unanimous)	3	70 kg World Max 2016 Group B Tournament Final
Kickboxing 70 kg	(Belarus) Dzianis Zuev	def.	(China) Liu Lei	Decision (unanimous)	3	70 kg World Max 2016 Group A Tournament Final
MMA 52 kg	(China) Weili Zhang	def.	(Ukraine) Svetlana Gotsyk	KO	2	
Kickboxing 52 kg	(Russia) Ekaterina Vandaryeva	def.	(Spain) Laurene De Oliveira	Decision (unanimous)	3	
Kickboxing 70 kg	(Thailand) Superbon Banchamek	def.	(Australia) Hussein Al Mansouri	Decision (unanimous)	3	
Kickboxing 75 kg	(Azerbaijan) Parviz Abdullayev	def.	(China) Nuerla Mulali	Decision (unanimous)	3	
Kickboxing 70 kg	(Russia) Arbi Emiev	def.	(Denmark) Mohammed El Mir	Decision (unanimous)	3	
Kickboxing 70 kg	(China) Liu Lei	def.	(Iran) Rezamanesh Benzad	Decision (unanimous)	3	70 kg World Max 2016 Group B Tournament Semifinal 2
Kickboxing 70 kg	(Belarus) Dzianis Zuev	def.	(Spain) Jonay Risco	Decision (unanimous)	3	70 kg World Max 2016 Group B Tournament Semifinal 1
Kickboxing 70 kg	(Thailand) Changpuak Jetsada Pongtong	def.	(China) Mo Zhuangwei	Decision (unanimous)	3	70 kg World Max 2016 Group A Tournament Semifinal 2
Kickboxing 70 kg	(Russia) Khayal Dzhaniev	def.	(Japan) Miyakoshi Soichiro	Decision (unanimous)	3	70 kg World Max 2016 Group A Tournament Semifinal 1
MMA 61 kg	(China) Alateng Heili	def.	(United States) Kana Hyatt	Decision (unanimous)	3	
Muay Thai	(Portugal) Francisco Tamagnini	def.	(Thailand) Thanarat Srisam	KO	2	

== Kunlun Fight 39 ==
Kunlun Fight 39
- Promotion: Kunlun Fight
- Date: March 20, 2016
- Venue: Dongguan Stadium
- City: Dongguan, China

Event chronology
Kunlun Fight 38 / Super Muaythai 2016	Kunlun Fight 39	Kunlun Fight 39

Kunlun Fight 39 was a kickboxing event held by Kunlun Fight on March 20, 2016 at the Dongguan Stadium in Dongguan, China.

=== Results ===
Fight Card
Weight Class				Method	Round	Notes
MMA 57 kg	(China) Zhang Meixuan	def.	(Philippines) Jhaymie Gayman	Submission (Triangle Choke)	1	
Kickboxing 70 kg	(Russia) Artem Pashporin	def.	(China) Li Zhuangzhuang	Decision (unanimous)	3	70 kg World Max 2016 Group D Tournament Final
Kickboxing 70 kg	(Thailand) Buakaw Banchamek	def.	(China) Kong Lingfeng	Decision	3	
Kickboxing 64 kg	(China) Wei Ninghui	def.	(Georgia (country)) Giorgi Khupenia	Decision (unanimous)	3	
Kickboxing 70 kg	(Russia) Artem Pashporin	def.	(Australia) Victor Nagbe	Decision	3	70 kg World Max 2016 Group D Tournament Semifinal 2
Kickboxing 70 kg	(China) Li Zhuangzhuang	def.	(Brazil) Bruno Miranda	Decision (unanimous)	3	70 kg World Max 2016 Group D Tournament Semifinal 1
Kickboxing 70 kg	(China) Zhao Shuai	def.	(Slovakia) Vladimir Konsky	Decision (unanimous)	3	70 kg World Max 2016 Group C Tournament Final
Kickboxing 72 kg	(China) Gu Hui	def.	(Netherlands) Albert Kraus	Decision (Extra Round)	4	
Kickboxing 90 kg	(China) Zhang Meng	def.	(France) Emmanuel Ulrich	Decision (unanimous)	3	
Kickboxing 67 kg	(South Korea) Kim Minsoo	def.	(China) Deng Li	KO	2	
Kickboxing 70 kg	(Slovakia) Vladimir Konsky	def.	(Morocco) Hakim Ait Hma	Decision (unanimous)	3	70 kg World Max 2016 Group C Tournament Semifinal 2
Kickboxing 70 kg	(China) Zhao Shuai	def.	(Iran) Seyedisa Alamdarnezam	Decision (unanimous)	3	70 kg World Max 2016 Group C Tournament Semifinal 1
Kickboxing	(Iran) Zhang Tao	def.	(China) Li Tongfei	Decision	3	

== Kunlun Fight 40 ==
Kunlun Fight 40
- Promotion: Kunlun Fight
- Date: March 25, 2016
- Venue: Tongling Zodiac Park
- City: Tongling, China

Event chronology
Kunlun Fight 39	Kunlun Fight 40	Kunlun Fight 41

Kunlun Fight 40 was a kickboxing event held by Kunlun Fight on March 25, 2016 at the Tongling Zodiac Park in Tongling, China.

=== Results ===
Fight Card
Weight Class				Method	Round	Notes
Kickboxing 70 kg	(South Korea) Lee Sung-hyun	def.	(Democratic Republic of the Congo) Chris Ngimbi	Decision (unanimous)	3	70 kg World Max 2016 Group F Tournament Final
Kickboxing 70 kg	(Thailand) Superbon Banchamek	def.	(Czech Republic) Martin Gano	KO	2	70 kg World Max 2016 Group E Tournament Final
MMA 70 kg	(Russia) Rim Khaziakhmetov	def.	(China) Wu Haotian	Submission (Kneebar)	2	
Kickboxing 70 kg	(Russia) Khayal Dzhaniev	def.	(China) Li Xianchao	KO	1	
Kickboxing 67 kg	(England) Craig Dickson	def.	(China) Zhang Jinglei	Decision (unanimous)	3	
Kickboxing 100+ kg	(United States) Steven Banks	vs.	(China) Asihati	No Contest (Asihati groin strike to Banks)		
Kickboxing 63 kg	(Thailand) Naruto Banchamek	def.	(China) Chen Wende	Decision (unanimous)	3	
Kickboxing 70 kg	(Russia) Dzhabar Askerov	vs.	(South Africa) Warren Stevelmans	Draw	4	
Kickboxing 70 kg	(Democratic Republic of the Congo) Chris Ngimbi	def.	(Ukraine) Sergey Kulyaba	KO	3	70 kg World Max 2016 Group F Tournament Semifinal 2
Kickboxing 70 kg	(South Korea) Lee Sung-hyun	def.	(China) Zhang Chunyu	TKO	3	70 kg World Max 2016 Group F Tournament Semifinal 1
Kickboxing 70 kg	(Czech Republic) Martin Gano	def.	(Azerbaijan) Parviz Abdullayev	Decision (unanimous)	3	70 kg World Max 2016 Group E Tournament Semifinal 2
Kickboxing 70 kg	(Thailand) Superbon Banchamek	def.	(China) Chen Cheng	KO (High kick)	3	70 kg World Max 2016 Group E Tournament Semifinal 1

== Kunlun Fight 41 ==
Kunlun Fight 41
- Promotion: Kunlun Fight
- Date: April 8, 2016
- Venue: Haihu District Gym Center
- City: Xining, China

Event chronology
Kunlun Fight 40	Kunlun Fight 41	Kunlun Fight 42

Kunlun Fight 41 was a kickboxing event held by Kunlun Fight on April 8, 2016 at the Haihu District Gym Center in Xining, China.

=== Results ===
Fight Card
Weight Class				Method	Round	Notes
Kickboxing 70 kg	(China) Wu Xuesong	def.	(Turkey) Tayfun Ozcan	KO	2	70 kg World Max 2016 Group G Tournament Final
Kickboxing 75 kg	(China) Zheng Zhaoyu	def.	(China) Nuerla Mulali	Decision (unanimous)	3	75 kg Tournament Final 16
MMA 66 kg	(South Korea) Sung Bin Jo	def.	(Malaysia) Muhammad Aiman	KO	1	
Kickboxing 75 kg	(Portugal) Diogo Calado	def.	(Azerbaijan) Parviz Abdullayev	Decision (unanimous)	3	75 kg Tournament Final 16
MMA 61 kg	(China) Chu Guangfu	def.	(Spain) Jose Francisco	KO	2	
Kickboxing 75 kg	(Azerbaijan) Alim Nabiev	def.	(Russia) Islam Murtazaev	Decision (unanimous)	3	75 kg Tournament Final 16
Kickboxing 57 kg	(China) Gao Qian	def.	(Italy) Miriam Sabot	Decision (unanimous)	3	
Kickboxing 70 kg	(China) Wu Xuesong	def.	(Brazil) Alex Oller	TKO	2	70 kg World Max 2016 Group G Tournament Semifinal 2
Kickboxing 70 kg	(Turkey) Tayfun Ozcan	def.	(Georgia (country)) Davit Kiria	Decision (unanimous)	3	70 kg World Max 2016 Group G Tournament Semifinal 1
Kickboxing 70 kg	(Thailand) Changpuak Jetsada Pongtong	def.	(China) Hao Dahui	KO	1	70 kg World Max 2016 Group G Tournament Reserve Fight
Kickboxing 75 kg	(China) Zhang Yang	def.	(South Korea) Daniel KwangSoo	Decision (unanimous)	3	75 kg Tournament Final 16
Kickboxing 67 kg	(China) Liang Shoutao	def.	(China) Wang Chunyang	Decision (unanimous)	3	
Boxing 58 kg	(China) Teriguna	def.	(Thailand) Vatinee Saranburus	TKO	2	

== Kunlun Fight 42 ==
Kunlun Fight 42
- Promotion: Kunlun Fight
- Date: April 9, 2016
- Venue: Haihu District Gym Center
- City: Xining, China

Event chronology
Kunlun Fight 41	Kunlun Fight 42	Kunlun Fight 43

Kunlun Fight 42 was a kickboxing event held by Kunlun Fight on April 9, 2016 at the Haihu District Gym Center in Xining, China.

=== Results ===
Fight Card
Weight Class				Method	Round	Notes
Kickboxing 72 kg	(China) Zhou Zhipeng	def.	(Japan) Nishikawa Tomoyuki	Decision (unanimous)	3	
Kickboxing 70 kg	(Suriname) Sergio Kanters	def.	(China) Zhong Weipeng	KO	1	70 kg World Max 2016 Group H Tournament Final
David Calvo had to drop out of the final due to a hand injury and was replaced by Zhong Weipeng.
MMA 58 kg	(China) Jin Tang	def.	(Brazil) Fabrina Vanessa	Submission (Armbar)	1	
Kickboxing 75 kg	(Thailand) Krit	def.	(China) Elias Emam Muhammat	TKO	2	75 kg Tournament Final 16
Kickboxing 80 kg	(China) Bo Fufan	def.	(Russia) Sergei	TKO	2	
Kickboxing 75 kg	(China) Ma Shuo	def.	(Belarus) Viachaslau Laurynovich	TKO	2	75 kg Tournament Final 16
MMA 77 kg	(China) Sun Jiming	def.	(Japan) Tetsuo Kondo	KO	1	
Kickboxing 75 kg	(Brazil) Fran Palenzuela	def.	(China) Zhang Zhaoquan	Decision (unanimous)	3	75 kg Tournament Final 16
Kickboxing 70 kg	(Spain) David Calvo	def.	(China) Feng Lei	KO	1	70 kg World Max 2016 Group H Tournament Semifinal 2
Kickboxing 70 kg	(Suriname) Sergio Kanters	def.	(Thailand) Saiyok Pumpanmuang	Decision (Extra Round)	4	70 kg World Max 2016 Group H Tournament Semifinal 1
Kickboxing 75 kg	(Iran) Hossein Karami	def.	(China) Law Chosing	Decision (Majority)	3	75 kg Tournament Final 16
Kickboxing 60 kg	(China) Zhu Xu	def.	(Iran) Hazhir Rahmani	Decision (unanimous)	3	
Kickboxing 70 kg	(China) Zhong Weipeng	def.	(China) Xu Shun	Decision (unanimous)	3	70 kg World Max 2016 Group H Tournament Reserve Fight

== Kunlun Fight 43 ==
Kunlun Fight 43
- Promotion: Kunlun Fight
- Date: April 26, 2016
- Venue: Haihu District Gym Center
- City: Zhoukou, China

Event chronology
Kunlun Fight 42	Kunlun Fight 43	Kunlun Fight 44 / MFP: Mayor's Cup 2016

Kunlun Fight 43 was a kickboxing event held by Kunlun Fight on April 26, 2016 at the Zhoukou Gymnasium in Zhoukou, China.

=== Results ===
Fight Card
Weight Class				Method	Round	Notes
MMA 75 kg	(China) Zhang Lipeng (c)	def.	(Japan) Takashi Noto	KO	1	For the Lightweight Championship
Kickboxing 70 kg	(China) Kong Lingfeng	def.	(South Korea) Kim Minsoo	TKO	2	70 kg World Max 2016 Group J Tournament Final
Kickboxing 63 kg	(Japan) Keijiro Miyakoshi	def.	(South Korea) Lee Chan Hyeong	Decision (unanimous - Extra Round)	4	
Kickboxing 65 kg	(China) Bai Lishuai	def.	(France) Brian Denis	Decision (unanimous)	3	
Muay Thai 58 kg	(Japan) Momotaro Kohei Kodera	def.	(United States) Adam Rothweiler	Decision (unanimous)	3	
Kickboxing 70 kg	(China) Dang Minghua	def.	(China) Xu Shun	Decision (unanimous)	3	
Kickboxing 70 kg	(South Korea) Kim Minsoo	def.	(China) Zhao Yan	Decision (unanimous)	3	70 kg World Max 2016 Group J Tournament Semifinal 2
Kickboxing 70 kg	(China) Kong Lingfeng	def.	(United States) Josh Aragon	Decision (Majority)	3	70 kg World Max 2016 Group J Tournament Semifinal 1
Kickboxing 80 kg	(Ukraine) Artur Kyshenko	def.	(Suriname) Murthel Groenhart	Decision (unanimous - Extra Round)	4	
Kickboxing 64 kg	(China) Wei Ninghui	def.	(Netherlands) Pascal Koster	Decision (unanimous)	3	
Kickboxing 70 kg	(Thailand) Sitthichai Sitsongpeenong	def.	(Netherlands) Mohamed Mezouari	Decision (Split - Extra Round)	4	70 kg World Max 2016 Group I Tournament Final
Kickboxing 70 kg	(Netherlands) Mohamed Mezouari	def.	(Belgium) Yussef Boulahtari	TKO	1	70 kg World Max 2016 Group I Tournament Semifinal 2
Kickboxing 70 kg	(Thailand) Sitthichai Sitsongpeenong	def.	(Morocco) Walid Hamid	TKO	2	70 kg World Max 2016 Group I Tournament Semifinal 1
Kickboxing 83 kg	(Latvia) Artur Gorlov	def.	(China) Bo Fufan	Decision (Majority)	3	
Kickboxing 65 kg	(China) Wang Kehan	def.	(Netherlands) Rachel Adamus	TKO	3	
Kickboxing 100+ kg	(China) Asihati	def.	(Sudan) Faisal Zakaria	KO	2	

=== 70kg World Max Group I tournament bracket ===
Semi-finals		Final
(Morocco) Walid Hamid	2r.
(Thailand) Sitthichai Sitsongpeenong	KO	(Thailand) Sitthichai Sitsongpeenong	DEC
(Netherlands) Mohamed Mezouari	KO	(Netherlands) Mohamed Mezouari	4r.
(Belgium) Yussef Boulahtari	1r.

=== 70kg World Max Group J tournament bracket ===
Semi-finals		Final
(United States) Josh Aragon	3r.
(China) Kong Lingfeng	DEC	(China) Kong Lingfeng	TKO
(South Korea) Kim Minsoo	DEC	(South Korea) Kim Minsoo	2r.
(China) Zhao Yan	3r.

== Kunlun Fight 44 / MFP: Mayor's Cup 2016 ==
Kunlun Fight 44 / MFP: Mayor's Cup 2016
- Promotion: Kunlun Fight / MFP
- Date: May 14, 2016
- Venue: Platinum Arena
- City: Khabarovsk, Russia

Event chronology
Kunlun Fight 43	Kunlun Fight 44 / MFP: Mayor's Cup 2016	Kunlun Fight - Cage Fight Series 5 / Top FC 11

Kunlun Fight 44 was a kickboxing event held by Kunlun Fight on May 14, 2016 at the Platinum Arena in Khabarovsk, Russia.

=== Results ===
Fight Card
Weight Class				Method	Round	Notes
Kickboxing 70 kg	(Romania) Claudiu Bădoi	def.	(Belgium) Yassin Baitar	Decision (Majority)	3	70 kg World Max 2016 Group L Tournament Final
MMA 100+ kg	(Latvia) Konstantin Gluhov	def.	(United States) Tony Lopez	Decision (unanimous)	3	
MMA 66 kg	(Russia) Alexey Polpudnikov	def.	(China) Yadong Song	KO	2	
Kickboxing 70 kg	(Romania) Claudiu Bădoi	def.	(Netherlands) Petro Sedarous	KO	1	70 kg World Max 2016 Group L Tournament Semifinal 2
Kickboxing 70 kg	(Belgium) Yassin Baitar	def.	(Russia) Dzhabar Askerov	Decision (unanimous)	3	70 kg World Max 2016 Group L Tournament Semifinal 1
Kickboxing 70 kg	(Suriname) Cedric Manhoef	def.	(Netherlands) Clayton Henriques	Decision (unanimous)	3	70 kg World Max 2016 Group K Tournament Final
MMA 85 kg	(Ukraine) Artem Shokalo	def.	(China) Wang Sai	KO	1	
MMA 63 kg	(Russia) Evgeniy Ryazanov	def.	(China) Salauat	Decision (unanimous)	3	
Kickboxing 70 kg	(Suriname) Cedric Manhoef	def.	(Colombia) Christopher Mena	Decision (unanimous)	3	70 kg World Max 2016 Group K Tournament Semifinal 2
Kickboxing 70 kg	(Netherlands) Clayton Henriques	def.	(China) Yang Yulong	Decision (unanimous)	3	70 kg World Max 2016 Group K Tournament Semifinal 1
MMA 75 kg	(China) Zhang Lipeng	def.	(Spain) Cesar Alonso	KO	1	
MMA 75 kg	(China) Elnur Agaev	def.	(South Africa) Vuyisile Colossa	TKO	2	
Kickboxing 70 kg	(Russia) Anatoly Moiseev	def.	(Suriname) Sergio Kanters	KO	2	

== Kunlun Fight - Cage Fight Series 5 / Top FC 11 ==
Kunlun Fight - Cage Fight Series 5 / Top FC 11
- Promotion: Kunlun Fight / Top FC
- Date: May 22, 2016
- Venue: Olympic Park, Seoul
- City: (South Korea) Seoul, Korea

Event chronology
Kunlun Fight 44 / MFP: Mayor's Cup 2016	Kunlun Fight - Cage Fight Series 5 / Top FC 11	Kunlun Fight 45

Kunlun Fight - Cage Fight Series 5 / Top FC 11 was a mixed martial arts event held by Kunlun Fight on May 22, 2016 at the Olympic Park, Seoul in Seoul, Korea.

=== Results ===
Fight Card
Weight Class				Method	Round	Notes
MMA 61.5 kg	(South Korea) Kwan Ho Kwak (c)	def.	(Turkey) Alp Ozkilic	Decision (Unanimous)	5	For the Top FC Bantamweight Championship
MMA 59 kg	(South Korea) Ji Yeon Kim	def.	(China) Jin Tang	Decision (Unanimous)	3	
MMA 72.5 kg	(Japan) Takenori Sato	def.	(South Korea) Kyung Soo Park	Submission (Armbar)	1	
MMA 59 kg	(South Korea) Kyu Sung Kim	def.	(China) Zhang Meixuan	Decision (Unanimous)	3	
MMA 70 kg	(England) Adam Boussif	def.	(South Korea) Jung Min Kang	Submission (Rear Naked Choke)	2	
MMA 61.5 kg	(South Korea) Jae Hyun So	def.	(China) Xie Junpeng	Decision (Unanimous)	3	
MMA 77 kg	(South Korea) Sung Won Son	def.	(South Korea) Jae Woong Kim	Decision (Unanimous)	3	
MMA 61.5 kg	(South Korea) Myung Gu Kim	def.	(China) Hao Jiahao	TKO	2	
MMA 77 kg	(South Korea) Yul Kim	def.	(South Korea) Gun Han Park	KO	2	
MMA 61.5 kg	(South Korea) Do Gun Son	def.	(South Korea) Hyung Joo Jeon	KO	3	
MMA 70 kg	(China) Wu Haotian	def.	(South Korea) Gyu Ho Song	Decision (Unanimous)	3	
MMA 66 kg	(China) Yan Xibo	def.	(Japan) Tomoaki Ueyama	Submission (Rear Naked Choke)	3	
MMA 54 kg	(China) Weili Zhang	def.	(Romania) Alice Ardelean	Submission (Rear Naked Choke)	2	
MMA 100+ kg	(China) Terigenle	def.	(South Korea) Hyun Soo Lee	Disqualification (Elbows to Spine)	2	

== Kunlun Fight 45 ==
Kunlun Fight 45
- Promotion: Kunlun Fight
- Date: June 5, 2016
- Venue: Sichuan Gymnasium
- City: Chengdu, China

Event chronology
Kunlun Fight - Cage Fight Series 5 / Top FC 11	Kunlun Fight 45	Kunlun Fight 46

Kunlun Fight 45 was a kickboxing event held by Kunlun Fight on June 5, 2016 at the Sichuan Gymnasium in Chengdu, China.

=== Results ===
Fight Card
Weight Class				Method	Round	Notes
Kickboxing 70 kg	(Thailand) Jomthong Chuwattana	def.	(China) Gu Hui	Decision (unanimous)	3	70 kg World Max 2016 Group M Tournament Final
Kickboxing 64 kg	(China) Wang Kehan	def.	(Indonesia) Shana Lammers	TKO	2	
Kickboxing 70 kg	(Thailand) Buakaw Banchamek	def.	(China) Wang Weihao	TKO	1	
MMA 84 kg	(China) Wang Sai	def.	(Japan) Koji Shikuwa	Decision (unanimous)	3	
Kickboxing 70 kg	(Thailand) Jomthong Chuwattana	def.	(South Africa) Warren Stevelmans	Decision (unanimous)	3	70 kg World Max 2016 Group M Tournament Semifinal 2
Kickboxing 70 kg	(China) Gu Hui	def.	(Japan) Yuichiro Nagashima	Decision (unanimous)	3	70 kg World Max 2016 Group M Tournament Semifinal 1
Kickboxing 80 kg	(Ukraine) Artur Kyshenko	def.	(Brazil) Jonatan Oliveira	Decision (unanimous)	3	
MMA 75 kg	(China) Zhang Lipeng	def.	(Belgium) Jan Quaeyhaegens	Submission	1	
Kickboxing 72 kg	(Canada) Matthew Richardson	vs.	(China) Kong Lingfeng	No Contest		
Kickboxing 80 kg	(China) Bo Fufan	def.	(South Africa) Vuyisile Colossa	Decision (majority)	3	
Kickboxing 75 kg	(China) Nuerla Mulali	def.	(Australia) Hussein Al Mansouri	Decision (unanimous)	3	
Kickboxing 70 kg	(China) Wu Xuesong	def.	(Ukraine) Levgenii Schevchenko	Decision (unanimous)	3	
Kickboxing 65 kg	(China) Lin Qiangbang	def.	(China) Lv Junyu	Decision (unanimous)	3	
MMA 60 kg	(China) Wang Bingyin	def.	(China) E Muxue	Decision (unanimous)	3	
MMA 60 kg	(China) Liu Pengshuai	def.	(China) Ni Gedan	TKO	2	

== Kunlun Fight 46 ==
Kunlun Fight 46
- Promotion: Kunlun Fight
- Date: June 26, 2016
- Venue: Kunming International Convention and Exhibition Centre
- City: Kunming, China

Event chronology
Kunlun Fight 45	Kunlun Fight 46	Kunlun Fight 47

Kunlun Fight 46 was a kickboxing event held by Kunlun Fight on June 26, 2016 at the Kunming International Convention and Exhibition Centre in Kunming, China.

=== Results ===
Fight Card
Weight Class				Method	Round	Notes
Kickboxing 70 kg	(China) Tian Xin	def.	(Poland) Lukasz Plawecki	Decision (second extra round - unanimous)	5	70 kg World Max 2016 Group O Tournament Final
Kickboxing 70 kg	(Netherlands) Albert Kraus	def.	(China) Li Zhuangzhuang	Decision (unanimous)	3	
MMA 66 kg	(South Korea) Sung Bin Jo	def.	(China) Zhao Xianchao	KO	1	
Kickboxing 65 kg	(China) Wei Ninghui	def.	(South Korea) Son Star	Decision (unanimous)	3	
Kickboxing 70 kg	(China) Tian Xin	def.	(United States) Joey Pagliuso	Decision (unanimous)	3	70 kg World Max 2016 Group O Tournament Semifinal 2
Kickboxing 70 kg	(Poland) Lukasz Plawecki	def.	(Japan) Nishikawa Tomoyuki	Decision (unanimous - Extra Round)	4	70 kg World Max 2016 Group O Tournament Semifinal 1
Kickboxing 70 kg	(Thailand) Arthit Hanchana	def.	(Netherlands) William Diender	Decision (unanimous)	3	70 kg World Max 2016 Group N Tournament Final
Muay Thai 70 kg	(Thailand) Saiyok Pumpanmuang	def.	(Belarus) Dzmitry Filipau	Decision (unanimous)	3	
Kickboxing 100+ kg	(China) Song Linyuan	def.	(Cyprus) Diakos Panagiotis	KO	3	100+ kg 2016 Tournament Quarterfinal
Kickboxing 100+ kg	(Ukraine) Tsotne Rogava	def.	(Belgium) Kirk Krouba	TKO	1	100+ kg 2016 Tournament Quarterfinal
Boxing 52 kg	(China) Teri Guna	def.	(Greece) Theofano Peloumpi	Decision (unanimous)	3	
Kickboxing 70 kg	(Thailand) Arthit Hanchana	def.	(Germany) Pascal Schroth	KO	2	70 kg World Max 2016 Group N Tournament Semifinal 2
Kickboxing 70 kg	(Netherlands) William Diender	def.	(China) Li Zikai	KO	2	70 kg World Max 2016 Group N Tournament Semifinal 1
Kickboxing 65 kg	(China) Zhao Jiangang	def.	(China) Lei Kui	Decision (unanimous)	3	
Kickboxing 70 kg	(China) Li Yongda	def.	(China) Hu Entu	Decision (unanimous)	3	
Kickboxing 70 kg	(China) Liu Tianjun	def.	(China) Su Zhiyong	Decision (unanimous)	3	

== Kunlun Fight 47 ==
Kunlun Fight 47
- Promotion: Kunlun Fight
- Date: July 10, 2016
- Venue: Wutaishan Sports Center
- City: Nanjing, China

Event chronology
Kunlun Fight 46	Kunlun Fight 47	Kunlun Fight 48

Kunlun Fight 47 was a kickboxing event held by Kunlun Fight on July 10, 2016 at the Wutaishan Sports Center in Nanjing, China.

=== Results ===
Fight Card
Weight Class				Method	Round	Notes
Kickboxing 75 kg	(China) Zheng Zhaoyu	def.	(China) Zhang Yang	Decision (unanimous)	1	75 kg Tournament Final
Kickboxing 52 kg	(Iran) Ali Sarinfar	def.	(China) Zhang Tao	Decision	3	
Kickboxing 52 kg	(Belarus) Ekaterina Vandaryeva	def.	(China) Zeng Xiaoting	TKO	3	
Kickboxing 75 kg	(China) Zheng Zhaoyu	def.	(China) Ma Shuo	TKO	1	75 kg Tournament Semifinal 2
Kickboxing 75 kg	(China) Zhang Yang	def.	(Portugal) Diogo Calado	Decision (unanimous)	3	75 kg Tournament Semifinal 1
MMA 59 kg	(China) Zhang Meixuan	def.	(Japan) Atsushi Tamura	KO	1	
Kickboxing 75 kg	(China) Ma Shuo	def.	(China) Law Chosing	Decision (majority)	3	75 kg Tournament Quarterfinal 4
Kickboxing 75 kg	(Portugal) Diogo Calado	def.	(Azerbaijan) Alim Nabiev	Decision (unanimous)	3	75 kg Tournament Quarterfinal 3
Kickboxing 75 kg	(China) Zhang Yang	def.	(Thailand) Krit	KO	1	75 kg Tournament Quarterfinal 2
Kickboxing 75 kg	(China) Zheng Zhaoyu	def.	(Iran) Hossein Karami	Decision (majority)	3	75 kg Tournament Quarterfinal 1
MMA 54 kg	(China) Weili Zhang	def.	(Belarus) Lilya Kazak	KO	2	
Kickboxing 70 kg	(Belarus) Andrei Kulebin	def.	(Australia) Victor Nagbe	Decision (unanimous)	3	70 kg World Max 2016 Group P Tournament Final
MMA 76 kg	(China) Zhang Lipeng	def.	(South Korea) Yul Kim	Decision (unanimous)	3	
Kickboxing 70 kg	(Australia) Victor Nagbe	def.	(Belgium) Ali Makhi	Decision (unanimous)	3	70 kg World Max 2016 Group P Tournament Semifinal 2
Kickboxing 70 kg	(Belarus) Andrei Kulebin	def.	(Portugal) Diogo Neves	Decision (unanimous)	3	70 kg World Max 2016 Group P Tournament Semifinal 1

=== 75kg Tournament 2016 bracket ===
Final 16; Kunlun Fight 41 & Kunlun Fight 42
(China) Zhang Zhaoquan	3r.
(Brazil) Fran Palenzuela	DEC
(China) Ma Suo	TKO
(Belarus) Viachaslau Laurynovich	2r.
(China) Nuerla	3r.
(China) Zheng Zhaoyu	DEC
(Iran) Hossein Karami	DEC
(China) Luo Zusheng	3r.
(China) Elias Emam Muhammat	2r.
(Thailand) Krit	TKO
(China) Zhang Yang	DEC
(South Korea) Daniel KwangSoo	3r.
(Azerbaijan) Parviz Abdullayev	3r.
(Portugal) Diogo Calado	DEC
(Azerbaijan) Alim Nabiev	DEC
(Russia) Islam Murtazaev	3r.

Quarter-finals; Kunlun Fight 47
(China) Luo Zusheng	3r.
(China) Ma Suo	DEC
(China) Zheng Zhaoyu	DEC
(Iran) Hossein Karami	3r.
(Thailand) Krit	1r.
(China) Zhang Yang	KO
(Portugal) Diogo Calado	DEC
(Azerbaijan) Alim Nabiev	3r.

Semi-finals; Kunlun Fight 47
(China) Ma Suo	1r.
(China) Zheng Zhaoyu	KO
(China) Zhang Yang	DEC
(Portugal) Diogo Calado	3r.

Final; Kunlun Fight 47
(China) Zheng Zhaoyu	DEC
(China) Zhang Yang	3r.

== Kunlun Fight 48 ==
Kunlun Fight 48
- Promotion: Kunlun Fight
- Date: July 31, 2016
- Venue: Jining Olympic Sports Center Gymnasium
- City: Jining, China

Event chronology
Kunlun Fight 47	Kunlun Fight 48	Kunlun Fight 49 / Rebels 45

Kunlun Fight 48 was a kickboxing event held by Kunlun Fight on July 31, 2016 at the Jining Olympic Sports Center Gymnasium in Jining, China.

=== Results ===
Fight Card
Weight Class				Method	Round	Notes
Kickboxing 70 kg	(Georgia (country)) Davit Kiria	def.	(Netherlands) Robbie Hageman	Decision (unanimous)	3	70 kg World Max 2016 Reserve Fight
Kickboxing 81 kg	(Ukraine) Artur Kyshenko	def.	(Brazil) Alex Pereira	TKO	2	
Kickboxing 70 kg	(Thailand) Superbon Banchamek	def.	(Russia) Khayal Dzhaniev	KO	2	70 kg World Max 2016 Tournament Final 16
MMA 54 kg	(China) Xiong Jingnan	def.	(Egypt) Mona Samir	KO	1	
Kickboxing 100+ kg	(China) Asihati	def.	(Egypt) Mahmoud Hassan	KO	1	100+ kg 2016 Tournament Quarterfinal
Kickboxing 100+ kg	(Belarus) Andrey Gerasimchuk	def.	(Portugal) Bruno Susano	Decision (unanimous)	3	100+ kg 2016 Tournament Quarterfinal
Kickboxing 70 kg	(China) Zhang Chunyu	def.	(China) Zhao Yan	Decision (Extra Round)	4	70 kg World Max 2016 Reserve Fight
Kickboxing 80 kg	(South Africa) Vuyisile Colossa	def.	(China) Nuerla Mulali	Decision (Extra Round)	4	
Kickboxing 65 kg	(France) Abdellah Ezbiri	def.	(Spain) Isaac Araya	Decision (unanimous)	3	65 kg 2016 Tournament Final 16
Kickboxing 65 kg	(South Korea) Kim Minsoo	def.	(Netherlands) Massaro Glunder	Decision (unanimous)	3	65 kg 2016 Tournament Final 16
Kickboxing 65 kg	(Belarus) Maxim Maruha	def.	(China) Zhang Jinglei	Decision (unanimous)	3	65 kg 2016 Tournament Final 16
Kickboxing 65 kg	(China) Meng Guodong	def.	(Georgia (country)) Giorgi Khufenia	Decision (majority)	3	65 kg 2016 Tournament Final 16

== Kunlun Fight 49 / Rebels 45 ==
Kunlun Fight 49 / Rebels 45
- Promotion: Kunlun Fight
- Date: August 7, 2016
- Venue: Ota-City General Gymnasium
- City: Tokyo, Japan

Event chronology
Kunlun Fight 48	Kunlun Fight 49 / Rebels 45	Kunlun Fight 50

Kunlun Fight 49 / Rebels 45 was a kickboxing event held by Kunlun Fight on August 7, 2016 at the Ota-City General Gymnasium in Tokyo, Japan.

=== Results ===
Fight Card
Weight Class				Method	Round	Notes
Kickboxing 70 kg	(Japan) Hinata Watanabe	def.	(Netherlands) Albert Kraus	Decision (unanimous)	3	
Kickboxing 55 kg	(Japan) Tenshin Nasukawa	def.	(China) Lin Bin	TKO	1	
Kickboxing 65 kg	(China) Wei Ninghui	def.	(Japan) Yosuke Mizuochi	KO (Right Hook)	2	65 kg 2016 Tournament Final 16
Kickboxing 65 kg	(Thailand) Petchtanong Banchamek	def.	(Japan) Tetsuya Yamato	Decision (unanimous)	3	65 kg 2016 Tournament Final 16
Kickboxing 70 kg	(Brazil) Danilo Zanolini	def.	(China) Gu Hui	Decision (unanimous)	3	
Kickboxing 70 kg	(China) Li Zhuangzhuang	def.	(Japan) Takuma Konishi	Decision (Majority)	3	
Kickboxing 63 kg	(Japan) Keijiro Miyakoshi	def.	(Thailand) Naruto Banchamek	Decision (Extra Round)	4	For the WBC Muay Thai International Lightweight Championship
MMA 57 kg	(China) Zhang Meixuan	def.	(Japan) Satoru Date	Decision (unanimous)	3	
MMA 52 kg	(China) Weili Zhang	def.	(Japan) Emi Fujino	TKO (Doctor Stoppage Elbow)	2	
Kickboxing 70 kg	(Netherlands) Mohamed Mezouari	def.	(Spain) David Ruiz	KO (Head Kick)	2	For the BLADE 70 kg Championship
Kickboxing 65 kg	(England) Craig Dickson	def.	(China) Bai Lishuai	Decision (unanimous)	3	65 kg 2016 Tournament Final 16
Kickboxing 65 kg	(Netherlands) Buray Bozaryilmaz	def.	(South Korea) Kim Dongsu	TKO (Punches)	3	65 kg 2016 Tournament Final 16

== Kunlun Fight 50 ==
Kunlun Fight 50
- Promotion: Kunlun Fight
- Date: August 20, 2016
- Venue: Jinan Olympic Sports Center Gymnasium
- City: Jinan, China

Event chronology
Kunlun Fight 49 / Rebels 45	Kunlun Fight 50	Kunlun Fight 51

Kunlun Fight 50 was a kickboxing event held by Kunlun Fight on August 20, 2016 at the Jinan Olympic Sports Center Gymnasium in Jinan, China.

=== Results ===
Fight Card
Weight Class				Method	Round	Notes
Kickboxing 70 kg	(Thailand) Sitthichai Sitsongpeenong	def.	(Portugal) Diogo Neves	Decision (unanimous)	3	70 kg 2016 Tournament Final 16
Claudiu Bădoi was replaced with Diogo Neves.
Kickboxing 70 kg	(China) Wu Xuesong	def.	(Suriname) Sergio Kanters	Decision (unanimous)	3	70 kg 2016 Tournament Final 16
Kickboxing 70 kg	(Suriname) Cedric Manhoef	def.	(China) Kong Lingfeng	Decision (unanimous)	3	70 kg 2016 Tournament Final 16
Kickboxing 70 kg	(Thailand) Jomthong Chuwattana	def.	(South Korea) Lee Sung-Hyun	Decision (unanimous)	3	70 kg 2016 Tournament Final 16
Kickboxing 70 kg	(China) Tian Xin	def.	(Belarus) Andrei Kulebin	Decision (majority)	3	70 kg 2016 Tournament Final 16
MMA 58 kg	(Russia) Natalya Safronova	def.	(China) Jin Tang	TKO	1	
Kickboxing 75 kg	(China) Zhang Yang	def.	(Iran) Hossein Karami	Decision (Extra Round)	4	
MMA 70 kg	(China) Wu Haotian	def.	(Netherlands) Pieter Buist	Submission	1	
Kickboxing 80 kg	(Suriname) Murthel Groenhart	def.	(Brazil) Jonatan Oliveira	TKO	2	80 kg 2016 Tournament Quarterfinal
Kickboxing 80 kg	(Russia) Alexander Stetsurenko	def.	(China) Bo Fufan	Decision (unanimous)	3	80 kg 2016 Tournament Quarterfinal
MMA 61 kg	(China) Chu Guangfu	def.	(South Korea) Seung Guk Choi	Decision (unanimous)	3	
Kickboxing 70 kg	(France) Yohann Drai	def.	(Thailand) Canison Yokasay	Decision (unanimous)	3	
Kickboxing	(China) Liu Hui	def.	(China) Jin Jincheng	Decision	3	
Kickboxing	(China) Li Jianfeng	def.	(China) Li Jia	Decision	3	
Kickboxing	(China) Lin Qiangbang	def.	(China) Hao Jiahao	Decision	3	

== Kunlun Fight 51 ==
Kunlun Fight 51
- Promotion: Kunlun Fight
- Date: September 10, 2016
- Venue: Strait Olympic Sports Center
- City: Fuzhou, China

Event chronology
Kunlun Fight 50	Kunlun Fight 51	Kunlun Fight 52

Kunlun Fight 51 was a kickboxing event held by Kunlun Fight on September 10, 2016, 2016 at the Strait Olympic Sports Center in Fuzhou, China.

=== Results ===
Fight Card
Weight Class				Method	Round	Notes
Kickboxing 65 kg	(China) Wei Ninghui	def.	(France) Abdellah Ezbiri	TKO	1	65 kg 2016 Tournament Final
Kickboxing 64 kg	(China) Wang Kehan	def.	(Belgium) Nathalie Visschers	TKO	3	
Kickboxing 61 kg	(China) Lu Dongqiang	def.	(South Korea) Kim Dangseong	KO (Extra Round)	4	
Kickboxing 65 kg	(France) Abdellah Ezbiri	def.	(Netherlands) Buray Bozaryilmaz	Decision (unanimous)	3	65 kg 2016 Tournament Semifinal
Petchtanong Banchamek was awarded the win due to an accidental cut but he couldn't continue fighting in the semifinals, Buray Bozaryilmaz advanced instead.
Kickboxing 65 kg	(China) Wei Ninghui	def.	(China) Meng Guodong	TKO	1	65 kg 2016 Tournament Semifinal
Kickboxing 80 kg	(Belgium) Marc de Bonte	def.	(Latvia) Artur Gorlov	TKO	3	80 kg 2016 Tournament Quarterfinal
Kickboxing 80 kg	(Belarus) Dmitry Valent	def.	(France) Cédric Tousch	Decision (Extra Round)	4	80 kg 2016 Tournament Quarterfinal
MMA 52 kg	(China) Xiong Jingnan	def.	(Russia) Julia Borisova	Decision (unanimous)	3	
Kickboxing 65 kg	(France) Abdellah Ezbiri	def.	(South Korea) Kim Minsoo	Decision	3	65 kg 2016 Tournament Quarterfinal
Kickboxing 65 kg	(Thailand) Petchtanong Banchamek	def.	(Netherlands) Buray Bozaryilmaz	TKO (Technical Decision)	2	65 kg 2016 Tournament Quarterfinal
Kickboxing 65 kg	(China) Meng Guodong	def.	(Belarus) Maksim Maruha	Decision (unanimous)	3	65 kg 2016 Tournament Quarterfinal
Kickboxing 65 kg	(China) Wei Ninghui	def.	(England) Craig Dickson	KO	2	65 kg 2016 Tournament Quarterfinal
Kickboxing	(China) Zhong Weipeng	def.	(China) Alimasi Rehemubai	TKO	1	
Kickboxing	(China) Zhou Bolong	def.	(China) Zhang Yongjie	Decision	2	
Kickboxing	(China) Wu Wenbin	def.	(China) Liu Yongfu	Decision	2	
Kickboxing	(China) Lin Weijiang	def.	(China) Chen Jiong	Decision	2	
Kickboxing	(China) Liao Rongzhen	def.	(China) Zhang Jiancheng	Decision	2	

=== 65kg Tournament 2016 bracket ===
Final 16; Kunlun Fight 48 & Kunlun Fight 49
(Netherlands) Massaro Glunder	3r.
(South Korea) Kim Minsoo	DEC
(France) Abdellah Ezbiri	TKO
(Spain) Isaac Araya	2r.
(Japan) Tetsuya Yamato	3r.
(Thailand) Petchtanong Banchamek	DEC
(Netherlands) Buray Bozaryilmaz	TKO
(South Korea) Kim Dongsu	3r.
(Georgia (country)) Giorgi Khufenia	2r.
(China) Meng Guodong	TKO
(Belarus) Maxim Maruha	DEC
(China) Zhang Jinglei	3r.
(Japan) Yosuke Mizuochi	2r.
(China) Wei Ninghui	KO
(England) Craig Dickson	DEC
(China) Bai Lishuai	3r.

Quarter-finals; Kunlun Fight 51
(South Korea) Kim Minsoo	3r.
(France) Abdellah Ezbiri	DEC
(Thailand) Petchtanong Banchamek	DEC
(Netherlands) Buray Bozaryilmaz	3r.
(China) Meng Guodong	DEC
(Belarus) Maxim Maruha	3r.
(China) Wei Ninghui	TKO
(England) Craig Dickson	2r.

Semi-finals; Kunlun Fight 51
(France) Abdellah Ezbiri	DEC
(Netherlands) Buray Bozaryilmaz	3r.
(China) Meng Guodong	1r.
(China) Wei Ninghui	TKO

Final; Kunlun Fight 51
(France) Abdellah Ezbiri	1r.
(China) Wei Ninghui	TKO

== Kunlun Fight 52 ==
Kunlun Fight 52
- Promotion: Kunlun Fight
- Date: September 11, 2016
- Venue: Strait Olympic Sports Center
- City: Fuzhou, China

Event chronology
Kunlun Fight 51	Kunlun Fight 52	Kunlun Fight 53

Kunlun Fight 52 was a kickboxing event held by Kunlun Fight on September 11, 2016 at the Strait Olympic Sports Center in Fuzhou, China.

=== Results ===
Fight Card
Weight Class				Method	Round	Notes
Kickboxing 100+ kg	(Belarus) Andrei Gerasimchuk	def.	(Ukraine) Tsotne Rogava	Decision (Unanimous - Extra Round)	4	100+ kg 2016 Tournament Final
Kickboxing 61 kg	(China) Wang Wanben	def.	(Canada) Denis Puric	Decision (Unanimous)	3	
Kickboxing 70 kg	(China) Cai Liangchan	def.	(Thailand) Petchmankong Gaiyanghaadao	Decision (Unanimous)	3	
MMA 66 kg	(South Korea) Jo Sung Bin	def.	(China) Alateng Burigede	Submission	1	
Kickboxing 100+ kg	(Belarus) Andrei Gerasimchuk	def.	(Greece) Atha Kasapis	Decision (Unanimous)	3	100+ kg 2016 Tournament Semifinal
Kickboxing 100+ kg	(Ukraine) Tsotne Rogava	def.	(China) Asihati	TKO	1	100+ kg 2016 Tournament Semifinal
Kickboxing 70 kg	(Georgia (country)) Davit Kiria	def.	(Belarus) Dzianis Zuev	Decision (Unanimous)	3	70 kg 2016 Tournament Final 16
Kickboxing 52 kg	(Belarus) Ekaterina Vandaryeva	def.	(China) Ren Kailin	Decision (Unanimous - Extra Round)	4	
Kickboxing 70 kg	(Russia) Anatoly Moiseev	def.	(Georgia (country)) Tamaz Izoria	Decision (Unanimous)	3	
MMA 67 kg	(China) Asikerbai	def.	(Brazil) Flavio Carvalho	Decision (Unanimous)	3	
Kickboxing 65 kg	(China) Zhang Chunyu	def.	(South Korea) Kim Hwatae	TKO	2	
Kickboxing 70 kg	(China) Hua Xu	def.	(Iran) Behzad Rezamanesh	KO	3	
Kickboxing	(China) Yuan La	vs.	(China) Fu Hongwei	Draw	4	
Kickboxing	(China) Zhang Meng	def.	(China) Chen Yan	Decision	3	

== Kunlun Fight 53 ==
Kunlun Fight 53
- Promotion: Kunlun Fight
- Date: September 24, 2016
- Venue: Kunlun Fight World Combat Sports Center
- City: Beijing, China

Event chronology
Kunlun Fight 52	Kunlun Fight 53	Kunlun Fight - Cage Fight Series 6

Kunlun Fight 53 was a kickboxing event held by Kunlun Fight on September 24, 2016 at the Kunlun Fight World Combat Sports Center in Beijing, China.

=== Results ===
Fight Card
Weight Class				Method	Round	Notes
Muay Thai 70 kg	(Thailand) Buakaw Banchamek	def.	(France) Dylan Salvador	Decision (Unanimous)	3	For the Muay Thai 70 kg Championship
MMA 75 kg	(China) Zhang Lipeng (c)	def.	(England) Adam Boussif	Decision (Unanimous)	3	For the Kunlun MMA Lightweight Championship
MMA 53 kg	(China) Weili Zhang	def.	(Brazil) Maira De Souza	Submission	1	For the Kunlun Female MMA Strawweight Championship
Kickboxing 70 kg	(Thailand) Superbon Banchamek	def.	(Thailand) Sitthichai Sitsongpeenong	Decision (Unanimous)	3	70 kg 2016 Tournament Quarterfinal
Kickboxing 70 kg	(Thailand) Jomthong Chuwattana	def.	(China) Tian Xin	Decision (Unanimous)	3	70 kg 2016 Tournament Quarterfinal
Kickboxing 75 kg	(Australia) Bradley Riddell	def.	(China) Zheng Zhaoyu	Decision (Unanimous - Extra Round)	4	
Kickboxing 73 kg	(Netherlands) Albert Kraus	def.	(China) Ma Shuo	KO	3	
Kickboxing 70 kg	(Russia) Khayal Dzhaniev	def.	(China) Kong Linfeng	Decision (Unanimous)	3	
Kickboxing 75 kg	(China) Nuerla Mulali	def.	(Thailand) Thongchai Sitsongpeenong	Decision (Unanimous)	3	
MMA 70 kg	(China) Wu Haotian	def.	(Mexico) Jose Ruelas	Submission	1	
Kickboxing 75 kg	(China) Zhang Yang	def.	(Azerbaijan) Parviz Abdullayev	Decision (Unanimous)	3	
Kickboxing	(China) Zhu Baotong	def.	(China) Li Yang	KO	1	
Kickboxing	(China) Lv Ruilei	def.	(China) Xu Zhaohui	TKO	1	
Kickboxing	(China) Sun Zhixiang	def.	(China) Wang Jingwei	KO	1	
Kickboxing	(China) Gong Yuankun	def.	(China) Zhao Yue	Decision (Unanimous)	3	

== Kunlun Fight - Cage Fight Series 6 ==
Kunlun Fight - Cage Fight Series 6
- Promotion: Kunlun Fight
- Date: October 21, 2016
- Venue: Yiwu Meihu Sports Centre
- City: Yiwu, China

Event chronology
Kunlun Fight 53	Kunlun Fight - Cage Fight Series 6	Kunlun Fight 54

Kunlun Fight - Cage Fight Series 6 was a mixed martial arts event held by Kunlun Fight on October 21, 2016 at the Yiwu Meihu Sports Centre in Yiwu, China.

=== Results ===
Fight Card
Weight Class				Method	Round	Notes
MMA 77 kg	(China) Wang Sai (c)	def.	(Japan) Horiuchi Yasuhiro	KO (Elbows)	3	For the Kunlun MMA Welterweight Championship
MMA 77 kg	(Russia) Muslim Salikhov	def.	(Brazil) Ivan Jorge	KO (spinning back kick)	1	
MMA 66 kg	(Japan) Kazushi Sugiyama	def.	(Russia) Anvar Alizhanov	Decision (Split)	3	
MMA 86 kg	(Russia) Jalil Alizhanov	def.	(China) Wenlong Pang	Submission (arm triangle choke)	1	
MMA 70 kg	(China) Yinna Bao	def.	(Russia) Rizvan Mirzabekov	Submission (Rear naked choke)	2	
MMA 120 kg	(Russia) Nikolay Savilov	def.	(Uzbekistan) Abror Yakhyaev	Submission (Leg Lock)	1	
MMA 86 kg	(New Zealand) John Vake	def.	(China) Mingyang Zhang	KO (left hook and punches)	1	
MMA 70 kg	(Russia) Ali Magomedkhanov	def.	(China) Xie Zhibin	KO	1	
MMA 66 kg	(Russia) Aliyar Sarkerov	def.	(Uzbekistan) Bakhodirjon	Submission (Armbar)	1	
MMA Female 57 kg	(China) Erman Ruo	def.	(Russia) Anastasia Kozlova	Decision (Unanimous)	3	

== Kunlun Fight 54 ==
Kunlun Fight 54
- Promotion: Kunlun Fight
- Date: October 30, 2016
- Venue: Optics Valley International Tennis Center
- City: Hubei, China

Event chronology
Kunlun Fight - Cage Fight Series 6	Kunlun Fight 54	Kunlun Fight 55

Kunlun Fight 54 was a kickboxing event held by Kunlun Fight on October 30, 2016 at the Optics Valley International Tennis Center in Hubei, China.

=== Results ===
Fight Card
Weight Class				Method	Round	Notes
Kickboxing 70 kg	(Suriname) Cedric Manhoef	def.	(China) Wu Xuesong	Decision (unanimous)	3	70 kg 2016 Tournament Quarterfinal
Kickboxing 61.5 kg	(China) Wang Kehan	def.	(Greece) Korina Papachrysanthou	TKO (Punches)	1	Female 61.5 kg 2016 Tournament Quarterfinal
Kickboxing 70 kg	(Japan) Yuichiro Nagashima	vs.	(China) Tian Xin	Draw	4	
MMA 58 kg	(China) Zhang Meixuan	vs.	(Thailand) Yodkaikaew Fairtex	Draw	3	
Kickboxing 65 kg	(Belarus) Dzianis Zuev	def.	(Russia) Dzhabar Askerov	Decision (Extra round)	4	
MMA 66 kg	(South Korea) Jo Sungbin	def.	(Serbia) Stefan Pijuk	Submission (Triangle choke)	1	
Kickboxing 72 kg	(China) Cai Liangchan	def.	(South Korea) Noh Jaegil	Decision (unanimous)	3	
Kickboxing 61.5 kg	(Brazil) Juliana Werner	def.	(Russia) Diana Zubrovskaia	TKO (punches)	1	Female 61.5 kg 2016 Tournament Quarterfinal
Kickboxing 75 kg	(Thailand) Arthit Hanchana	def.	(Japan) Konishi Takuma	Decision (unanimous)	3	
Kickboxing 61.5 kg	(Netherlands) Anissa Haddaoui	def.	(Portugal) Marisa Pires	Decision (unanimous)	3	Female 61.5 kg 2016 Tournament Quarterfinal
Kickboxing 60 kg	(China) Wang Wenfeng	def.	(South Korea) Chan Hyung Lee	Decision (unanimous)	3	
Kickboxing 61.5 kg	(France) Laëtitia Madjene	def.	(Canada) Candice Mitchell	Decision (unanimous)	3	Female 61.5 kg 2016 Tournament Quarterfinal
Kickboxing	(China) Liu Tong	def.	(China) Sun Lang	Decision	2	
Kickboxing	(China) Cao Zhiwu	def.	(China) Shang Xiangyi	Decision	2	
Kickboxing	(China) Xiang Jun	def.	(China) Zhang Heng	Decision	2	

== Kunlun Fight 55 ==
Kunlun Fight 55
- Promotion: Kunlun Fight
- Date: December 10, 2016
- Venue: Guoxin Gymnasium
- City: Qingdao, Shandong, China

Event chronology
Kunlun Fight 54	Kunlun Fight 55	Kunlun Fight 55

Kunlun Fight 55 was a kickboxing event held by Kunlun Fight on December 10, 2016 at the Guoxin Gymnasium in Qingdao, Shandong, China.

=== Results ===
Fight Card
Weight Class				Method	Round	Notes
Kickboxing 80 kg	(Russia) Alexander Stetsurenko	def.	(Belarus) Dmitry Valent	Decision (Split)	3	80 kg 2016 Tournament Final
MMA 85 kg	(China) Wang Sai	def.	(Japan) Koji Shikuwa	Decision (Unanimous)	3	
Kickboxing 120 kg	(United States) Steven Banks	vs.	(China) Asihati	KO	1	
MMA 75 kg	(China) Zhang Lipeng	def.	(Spain) Javier Fuentes	TKO (Punches)	1	
Kickboxing 72 kg	(China) Kong Lingfeng	def.	(China) Li Zhuangzhuang	Decision (Unanimous)	3	
Kickboxing 67 kg	(Netherlands) Massaro Glunder	def.	(China) Zhang Chunyu	Decision (Extra Round)	4	
Kickboxing 75 kg	(China) Zhang Yang	def.	(Thailand) Komsan Hanchana	Decision (Unanimous)	3	
Kickboxing 80 kg	(Russia) Muslim Salikhov	def.	(China) Nuerla Mulali	KO (Spinning Backfist)	2	80 kg 2016 Tournament Reserve Fight
Kickboxing 80 kg	(Belarus) Dmitry Valent	def.	(Morocco) Hicham El Gaoui	Decision (Unanimous)	3	80 kg 2016 Tournament Semifinal
Kickboxing 80 kg	(Russia) Alexander Stetsurenko	def.	(Netherlands) Darryl Sichtman	Decision (Unanimous)	3	80 kg 2016 Tournament Semifinal
Kickboxing 61 kg	(China) Lin Qiangbang	def.	(Hong Kong) Lau Waicheuk	TKO	3	
Kickboxing	(Japan) Kodera Kohei	def.	(China) Gong Yuankun	Decision	3	
Kickboxing	(China) He Biao	def.	(China) Huang Zhuocheng	TKO	2	
MMA	(China) Xu Weihao	def.	(China) Wu Tianjin	Decision	2	
Kickboxing	(China) Bunnam	vs.	(China) Xi Shadyu	Draw	2	

== Kunlun Fight MMA 7 ==
Kunlun Fight MMA 7
- Promotion: Kunlun Fight
- Date: December 15, 2016
- Venue: Kunlun Fight World Combat Sports Center
- City: Beijing, China

Event chronology
Kunlun Fight 55	Kunlun Fight MMA 7	Kunlun Fight 56

Kunlun Fight MMA 7 was a mixed martial arts event held by Kunlun Fight on December 15, 2016 at the Kunlun Fight World Combat Sports Center in Beijing, China.

=== Results ===
Fight Card
Weight Class				Method	Round	Notes
Female MMA 57 kg	(China) Weili Zhang	def.	(Venezuela) Karla Benitez	KO (Left Hook)	1	For the Kunlun Female MMA Strawweight Championship
Female MMA 57 kg	(China) Xiong Jingnan	def.	(Slovakia) Alena Gondášová	TKO (Punches)	2	
Female MMA 61 kg	(Georgia (country)) Liana Jojua	def.	(China) Tao Li	submission (Armbar)	1	
MMA 66 kg	(China) Zhumabek Tursyn	def.	(Georgia (country)) Paata Robakidze	TKO (Liver Kick).	2	
MMA 66 kg	(China) Xibo Yan	def.	(India) Chaitanya Gavali	KO (Punch)	1	
Female MMA 57 kg	(China) Na Liang	def.	(Poland) Barbara Nalepka	Submission (Rear Naked Choke)	1	
Female MMA 57 kg	(China) Jin Tang	def.	(Armenia) Karine Gevorgyan	TKO (Elbows)	1	
MMA 61 kg	(China) Huo You Xia Bu	def.	(Portugal) Fábio Sousa	TKO (Punches)	1	
Female MMA 57 kg	(United States) Mallory Martin	def.	(China) Heqin Lin	Decision (Unanimous)	3	
MMA 70 kg	(China) Haotian Wu	def.	(France) Farès Ziam	Submission (Rear Naked Choke)	1	
Female MMA 61 kg	(China) Wu Yanan	def.	(United States) Anjela Pink	TKO (Punches)	1	
Female MMA 57 kg	(Brazil) Marilia Santos	def.	(China) Qihui Yan	Decision (Unanimous)	3	

== See also ==
- List of Kunlun Fight events
- 2016 in Glory
- 2016 in Glory of Heroes
- 2016 in K-1
