= Parviz Abdullayev =

Azerbaijani kickboxer

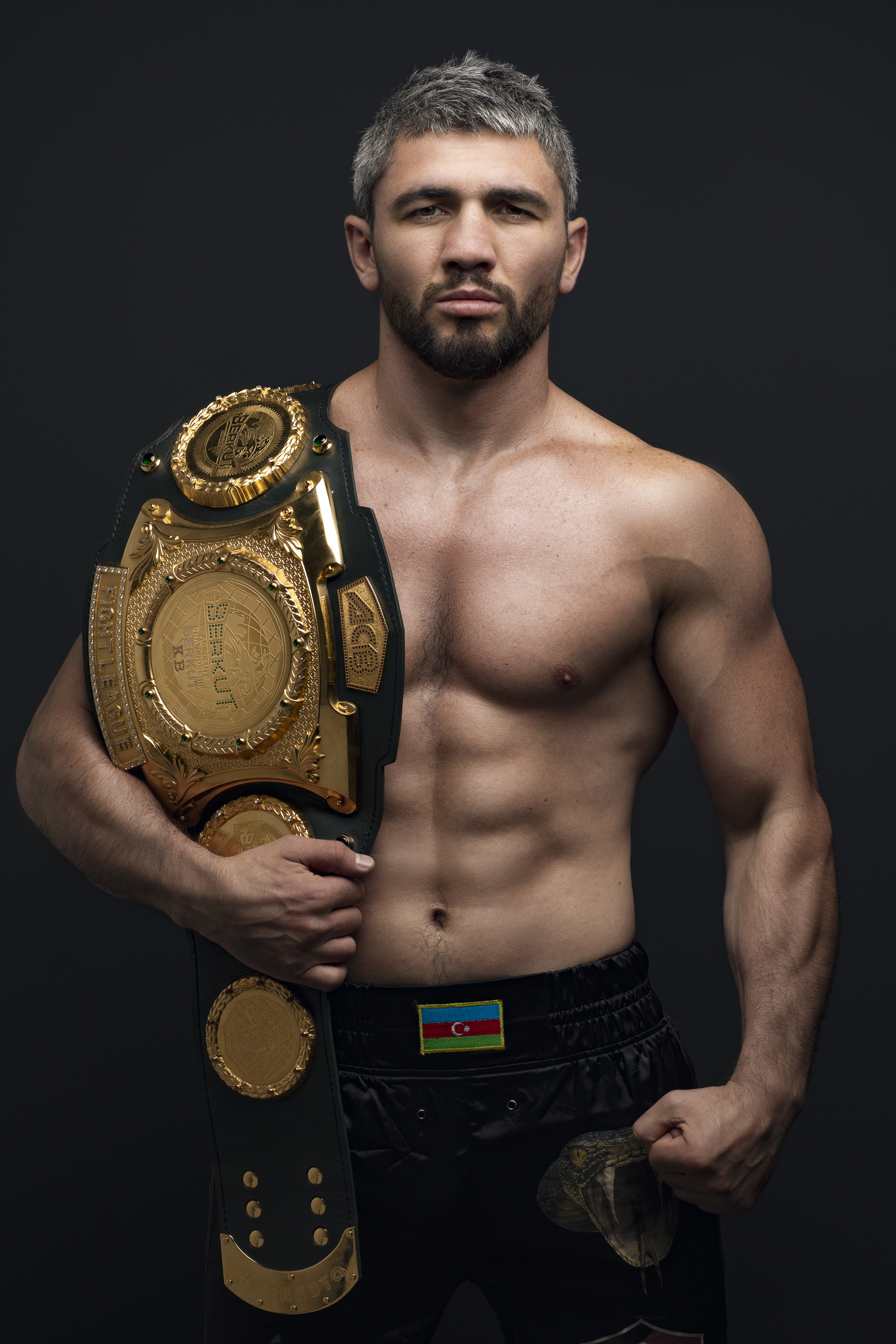
- Born: Pərviz Abdullayev; January 5, 1986 (age 40); Aghdam, Azerbaijan
- Other names: Cobra Parviz
- Nationality: Azerbaijani
- Height: 1.76 m (5 ft 9 in)
- Weight: 77.0 kg (169.8 lb; 12.13 st)
- Style: Kickboxing
- Years active: 1997–present

Kickboxing record
- Total: 56
- Wins: 50
- By knockout: 27
- Losses: 6
- Last updated on: June 27, 2025

Parviz Abdullayev
Medal record

Representing Azerbaijan

Men's Kickboxing

World Combat Games
Gold medal – first place	2010 Beijing	Low kick (-71 kg

Parviz Abdullayev is an Azerbaijani professional kickboxer and former sanshou athlete who is an honored Sport Master of Azerbaijan. A three-time WAKO PRO world champion, he has competed for the likes of ACB, where he is the current Welterweight Kickboxing champion. In sanshou, he is a multiple-time medalist at the World Cup, and was a national champion in the sport.

== Early life ==
Abdullayev was born in Azerbaijan, Aghdam, on January 5, 1986. He had his early education in Agdam, then graduated from middle school No. 250 in Baku. In 2003 he was admitted into the Faculty of History at Baku State University.

In 2010 he was declared as one of the top 10 athletes of the year in Azerbaijan.

Abdullayev was rewarded with a new apartment for his success in sport by President of Azerbaijan, Ilham Aliyev. He has been leading his "Cobra" kickboxing club since 2011.

He is a contributor at Sport Healthy Centre of Ministry of Ministry of Emergency Situations since 2013. He represents Gabala Sport Club. He is married and has 2 sons. He is training his son Yusif in boxing.

== Professional career ==
He began training martial art at the age of twelve (1997), starting with kung fu.

Starting his professional sport career in 2007, Abdullayev became champion of Azerbaijan in the martial art of Wushu-sanshou in 2007–08.

In 2007 he took second place in Wushu-sanshou in the World Cup competition which took place in China. In those years he simultaneously began to participate in kickboxing fights.

In 2009 he won five fights in kickboxing competitions and won the title of World Champion in the 71 kg weight class which organized by WAKO countries in Villach, Austria.

In 2010 he participated at "World Accord Combat Games 2010" held in Beijing, China and became the champion.

In May 2010 he participated at World Cup games in WAKO Kickboxing competition held in Hungary and took second place.

In 2010 Abdullayev defeated Russian rival Vladimir Shulyak WAKO European Championship held in Baku, Azerbaijan. He became World Champion and was awarded the world belt.

He started training at "Super Pro" club of Netherlands by his master Dennis Ravel in 2011. In 2011 he participated in a competition held in Rostov-on-Don, Russia among professionals and became World Champion for the second time.

In 2013 Abdullayev defeated his rival Vitaliy Soroka for the sake of R1 World's Belt and became world Champion held in Rostov, Russia. In 2014 he defeated rival from Morocco at IPCC kickboxing competitions and again obtained world Champion title, was awarded the world's belt.

In 2014 Abdullayev defeated his Romanian rival and got "Haydar Aliyev Belt" at a tournament dedicated to national leader Heydar Aliyev’s 90th anniversary held in Vienna.

In 2017 he took third place in Wushu-Sanda at the 4th Islamic Solidarity Games in Baku, Azerbaijan.

In 2018 he participated in ACB KB professional kickboxing tournament in Moscow. He defeated his Chechen opponent kickboxer from Russia. Abdullayev became world Champion and for the first time was awarded ACB fight belt.

Abdullayev has participated in fights promoted by Glory, SUPERKOMBAT and Kunlun Fight.

Abdullayev's trainer is two-time World Champion Fizuli Musayev, the personal trainer of Mehman Umudov.

== Awards and honours ==
- 2007 – Azerbaijan Champion to wushu-Sanshou
- 2007 – the world Cup, 2nd-place to Wushu-sanshou
- 2009 – World Campion to Kickboxing WAKO
- 2010 – winner "World Accord Combat Games 2010"
- 2010 – the world cup, 2nd place to kickboxing WAKO
- 2010 – World Campion, World Belt to kickboxing WAKO PRO
- 2011 - World Campion, World Belt to kickboxing WAKO PRO
- 2013 – world champion, world belt, R1
- 2014 – World Champion, World Belt to IPCC Kickboxing
- 2014 – "Heydar Aliyev Belt"
- 2017 – IV Islamic Solidarity Games, 2nd place
- 2018 – ACB Fight Belt

== Fight record (incomplete) ==
Muay Thai record
50 wins (27 (T)KOs), 6 losses
Date	Result	Opponent	Event	Location	Method	Round	Time
2025-04-26	Win	(Netherlands) Guillermo Blokland	Akin Fight Arena	Istanbul, Turkey	TKO	1	
2017-01-01	Win	(Hong Kong) Law Chosing	Kunlun Fight 56	Sanya, Hainan, China	Decision	1	4:10
2016-9-24	Loss	(China) Zhang Yang	Kunlun Fight 53	Beijing, China	Decision (unanimous)	3	3:00
2016-04-08	Loss	(Portugal) Diogo Calado	Kunlun Fight 41 - 75 kg Tournament Final 16	Xining, China	Decision	3	3:00
2016-03-25	Loss	(Czech Republic) Martin Gano	Kunlun Fight 40 - 70 kg World Max 2016 Qualifier Tournament	Tongling, China	Decision	1	4:10
2016-02-21	Win	(China) Nuerla Mulali	Kunlun Fight 38	Pattaya, Thailand	Decision	3	3:00
2015-12-04	Win	(Morocco) Aziz Kallah	Glory 26: Amsterdam	Amsterdam, Netherlands	Decision (unanimous)	3	3:00
2015-09-04	Loss	(China) Nuerla Mulali	Kunlun Fight 30	Zhoukou, China	Decision	3	3:00
2015-07-19	Win	(China) Zhang Zhaoguan	Kunlun Fight 28	Nanjing, China	Decision	3	3:00
2015-05-02	Win	(Romania) Alexandru Popescu	Kunlun Fight 24	Verona, Italy	KO	1	
2014-08-24	Win	(China) Zheng Zhaoyu	Kunlun Fight 8	Xining, China	Decision	3	3:00
2013-05-10	Win	(Romania) Gabriel Bozan	Superkombat New Heroes 3	Vienna, Austria	Decision (unanimous)	3	3:00
