= Cedric Manhoef =

Surinamese professional kickboxer

- Born: April 19, 1993 (age 33); Paramaribo, Suriname
- Other names: Baas
- Nationality: Surinamese
- Height: 1.76 m (5 ft 9 1/2 in)
- Weight: 70 kg (154 lb; 11 st 0 lb)
- Division: Middleweight
- Style: Kickboxing
- Fighting out of: Hoofddorp, Netherlands
- Team: Manhoef Fight & Fitness; Mike's Gym
- Trainer: Melvin Manhoef

Kickboxing record
- Total: 92
- Wins: 80
- By knockout: 10
- Losses: 10
- By knockout: 1
- Draws: 2

Other information
- Notable relatives: Melvin Manhoef, cousin
- Last updated on: September 22, 2018

Cedric Manhoef (born 19 April 1993) is a Surinamese professional kickboxer and K-1 and SUPERKOMBAT fighter, where he held the SUPERKOMBAT New Heroes Middleweight Championship. He is trained by his older cousin Melvin Manhoef who inspired him to pursue his career.

As of 12 March 2018, he is ranked the #7 lightweight in the world by LiverKick.com.

== Championships ==
=== Kickboxing ===
- Kunlun Fight
  - 2016 Kunlun Fight World Max Group K Tournament Winner
- World Fighting League
  - 2015 WFL -70 kg Tournament Champion
- SUPERKOMBAT Fighting Championship
  - SUPERKOMBAT New Heroes Middleweight Championship -71 kg/156.5 lb (One time)

== Kickboxing record ==
Professional kickboxing record
53 wins (10 KOs), 10 losses, 2 draws
Date	Result	Opponent	Event	Location	Method	Round	Time
2019-03-09	Loss	(France) Johan Tkac	Fight Stadium 4, Semi Finals	France	Decision (Unanimous)	4	3:00
2018-09-22	Win	(South Sudan) Lofogo Sarour	World Fighting League, Final 16	Almere, Netherlands	TKO (three knockdown rule)	3	N/A
2017-11-25	Loss	(Belarus) Chingiz Allazov	Nuit Des Champions 2017	Marseille, France	Decision (Unanimous)	5	3:00
Fight Was For the NDC -70 kg Champion.
2017-07-15	Loss	(Thailand) Jomthong Chuwattana	Kunlun Fight 64	chongqing, China	Ex.R Decision (Unanimous)	4	3:00
2017-05-14	Loss	(Thailand) Yodsanklai Fairtex	Kunlun Fight 61 - World Max 2017 Group H Tournament Semi Finals	Sanya, China	Decision (Unanimous)	3	3:00
2017-01-01	Loss	(Thailand) Superbon Banchamek	Kunlun Fight 56 - World Max Tournament 2016, Semi Finals	Sanya, China	Decision (Unanimous)	3	3:00
2016-10-30	Win	(China) Wu Xuesong	Kunlun Fight 54 - World MAX Tournament 2016 Final 8	Hubei, China	Decision (Unanimous)	3	3:00
Qualified to Kunlun Fight 2016 70kg World MAX Tournament Final 4.
2016-08-20	Win	(China) Kong Lingfeng	Kunlun Fight 50 – World MAX Tournament 2016 Final 16	Jinan, China	Decision (unanimous)	3	3:00
Qualified to Kunlun Fight 2016 70kg World MAX Tournament Final 8.
2016-05-14	Win	(Netherlands) Clayton Henriques	Kunlun Fight 44 – World MAX 2016 Group K Tournament, Final	Khabarovsk, Russia	Decision (Unanimous)	3	3:00
Qualified to Kunlun Fight 2016 70kg World MAX Tournament Final 16.
2016-05-14	Win	(Colombia) Christopher Mena	Kunlun Fight 44 – World MAX 2016 Group K Tournament, Semi Finals	Khabarovsk, Russia	Decision (Unanimous)	3	3:00
2016-04-23	Loss	(Russia) Vlad Tuinov	W5 Grand Prix "KITEK"	Moscow, Russia	Decision (unanimous)	3	3:00
2016-02-26	Loss	(Thailand) Jo Nattawut	Lion Fight XXVIII	Mashantucket Pequot, Connecticut, USA	Decision (unanimous)	3	3:00
For the Lion Fight Super Welterweight Champion.
2015-12-05	Win	(Albania) Faton Vukshinaj	Mix Fight Gala, Final	Frankfurt, Germany	Decision	3	3:00
Wins the Mix Fight Gala 72.5kg Tournament Champion.
2015-12-05	Win	(Albania) Lirim Ahmeti	Mix Fight Gala, Semi Finals	Frankfurt, Germany	Decision	3	3:00
2015-10-18	Win	(Netherlands) Massaro Glunder	WFL "Unfinished Business", 70 kg 4 Man Tournament, Final	Hoofddorp, Netherlands	Decision	3	3:00
Wins the WFL 70kg Tournament Championship.
2015-10-18	Win	(Cape Verde) Edson Fortes	WFL "Unfinished Business", 70 kg 4 Man Tournament, Semi Finals	Hoofddorp, Netherlands	Decision	3	3:00
2015-05-16	Loss	(Morocco) Nordin Ben Moh	A1 WCC Platinum	Eindhoven, Netherlands	Decision (split)	3	3:00
2015-04-12	Win	(Netherlands) Mohammed El Messaoudi	World Fighting League	Hoofddorp, Netherlands	Decision	3	3:00
2014-10-04	Win	(Germany) Redouane Derras	Mix Fight Gala XVI - Tournament, Final	Fulda, Germany	KO	1	
2014-10-04	Win	(Germany) Danijel Solaja	Mix Fight Gala XVI - Tournament, Semi Final	Fulda, Germany	Decision (unanimous)	3	3:00
2014-05-17	Loss	(Turkey) Cenk Cankutaranoglu	A1 World Combat Cup, Final 16	Eindhoven, Netherlands	Ext R. Decision	4	3:00
2014-03-29	Draw	(Romania) Amansio Paraschiv	SUPERKOMBAT New Heroes 7	Ploiești, Romania	Draw (majority)	3	3:00
Defended his SUPERKOMBAT New Heroes Middleweight Championship.
2014-02-23	Win	(Azerbaijan) Ismat Agazade	K-1 World MAX 2014 World Championship Tournament Final 4	Baku, Azerbaijan	Decision (unanimous)	3	3:00
2013-12-01	Win	(Morocco) Brahim Kallah	Fight Fans VII	Amsterdam, Netherlands	Decision (unanimous)	3	3:00
2013-11-03	Win	(Romania) Cristian Milea	SUPERKOMBAT New Heroes 6	Carrara, Italy	Decision (Split)	3	3:00
Won the vacant SUPERKOMBAT New Heroes Middleweight Championship.
2013-10-05	Win	(Netherlands) Nader Farhou	Fight Fans VI	Amsterdam, Netherlands	Decision (unanimous)	3	3:00
2013-08-31	Win	(Romania) Alexandru Popescu	SUPERKOMBAT VIP Edition	Bucharest, Romania	Decision (unanimous)	3	3:00
2013-08-08	Win	(Indonesia) Mika Tahitu	Slamm!! Soema Na Basi IV	Paramaribo, Suriname	Decision (unanimous)	3	3:00
2013-06-29	Win	(Netherlands) Danny Hoving	Death Before Dishonor	Almere, Netherlands	KO (punches)	1	
2013-06-01	Draw	(Angola) Christian Baya	Fight Fans V	Amsterdam, Netherlands	Decision Draw	3	3:00
2013-03-24	Win	(Netherlands) Abder Bchrie	Haarlem Fight Night IV	Haarlem, Netherlands	Decision (unanimous)	3	3:00
2012-12-15	Win	(Thailand) Songkran Bamrungsri	K-1 World MAX 2012 World Championship Tournament Final	Athens, Greece	Decision (unanimous)	3	3:00
2012-11-03	Win	(Suriname) Merray Swedo	No Guts No Glory 6, Final	Hellevoetsluis, Netherlands	Decision (unanimous)	3	3:00
2012-11-03	Win	(Kenya) Kevin Miruka	No Guts No Glory 6, Semi Finals	Hellevoetsluis, Netherlands	Decision (unanimous)	3	3:00
2012-10-14	Win	(Iran) Asqar Ghanbari Adivi		Netherlands	KO		
2012-06-03	Loss	(Netherlands) Steve Poort	Fight Fans, Final	Amsterdam, Netherlands	KO (right high kick)	1	
2012-06-03	Win	(Netherlands) Ilias Hammouche	Fight Fans, Semi Finals	Amsterdam, Netherlands	KO		
2012-04-14	Win	(Netherlands) Abdelmonim Mouyah	Bari Gym Event 2012	Noordwijkerhout, Netherlands			
2012-02-26	Win	(Netherlands) Illias Tanouti	Next One	Nieuwegein, Netherlands	Decision (unanimous)	3	3:00
2011-10-09	Win	(Jamaica) Luke Whelan	The Wolfpack	Oostzaan, Netherlands			3:00
Legend: Win Loss Draw/No contest Notes

== Mixed martial arts record ==
Professional record breakdown
2 matches	0 wins	2 losses
By knockout	0	1
By decision	0	1

Res.	Record	Opponent	Method	Event	Date	Round	Time	Location	Notes
Loss	0–2	BeyNoah	KO (punch)	LFA 213	July 26, 2025	3	0:49	Lemoore, California, United States	
Loss	0–1	Anuar Bensayiid	Decision (unanimous)	Fight2One 1	March 18, 2023	3	5:00	Tenerife, Spain	Lightweight debut.

== See also ==
- List of K-1 events
- List of male kickboxers
