= Tsotne Rogava =

Ukrainian kickboxer (born 1993)

- Born: 2 May 1993 (age 33); Zugdidi, Georgia
- Native name: Цотне Рогава
- Nationality: Ukrainian
- Height: 1.96 m (6 ft 5 in)
- Weight: 121.5 kg (268 lb; 19.13 st)
- Division: Heavyweight
- Style: Muay Thai; Kickboxing
- Stance: Orthodox
- Fighting out of: Odesa, Ukraine
- Team: Captain Odesa

Professional boxing record
- Total: 14
- Wins: 13
- By knockout: 8
- Losses: 1
- Draws: 0
- No contests: 0

kickboxing record
- Total: 21
- Wins: 13
- By knockout: 8
- Losses: 8

Other information
- Boxing record from BoxRec

Tsotne Badrievich Rogava (Ukrainian: Цотне Бадрієвич Рогава; born 2 May 1993) is a Ukrainian heavyweight Muay Thai kickboxer, fighting out of the Captain Odesa gym in Odesa. He is the current ACB Kickboxing Heavyweight champion and the 2012 Tatneft Arena World Cup winner.

== Kickboxing career ==
On October 20, 2012, he beat Zinedine Hameur-Lain in the semifinals and Vladimir Toktasynov in the finals by decision to win the Tatneft Cup 2012.

He lost to Vitor Miranda by unanimous decision in the first round of the Tatneft Cup 2013 on February 23, 2013.

Rogava faced Paul Slowinski in a match for the vacant WMC World Super Heavyweight (+95 kg/209 lb) Championship at Monte Carlo Fighting Masters 2014 in Monte Carlo, Monaco on June 14, 2014, losing by unanimous decision.

In 2016, during Kunlun Fight 52, Rogava took part in the KLF Heavyweight tournament. He beat Asihati by a first-round KO in the semifinals, but lost to Andrey Gerasimchuk by an extra round decision in the finals.

He was scheduled to fight Jhonata Diniz for the Absolute Championship Akhmat Heavyweight Kickboxing title. Rogava beat Diniz by unanimous decision.

Rogava participated in the 2018 FEA World Heavyweight Grand Prix. In the semifinals, he defeated Daniel Lentie by a first-round TKO. In the finals, Tsotne faced Roman Kryklia. The fight went into an extra fourth round, after which Kryklia won a decision.

== Titles and accomplishments ==
=== Muay Thai and Kickboxing ===
==== Professional ====
- Absolute Championship Berkut
  - 2018 ACB KB Heavyweight Champion
- Kunlun Fight
  - 2016 Kunlun Fight 100+ kg 2016 Tournament Runner-Up
- Tatneft Cup
  - 2012 Tatneft Arena World Cup (+91 kg) Champion

==== Amateur ====
- International Federation of Muaythai Associations
  - 2018 IFMA World Championship (gold) +91 kg
  - 2017 IFMA World Championship (gold) +91 kg
  - 2015 IFMA World Championship (bronze) +91 kg
  - 2013 IFMA European Championship (gold) +91 kg
  - 2012 IFMA World Championship (gold) +91 kg
  - 2012 IFMA European Championship (gold) +91 kg
  - 2011 IFMA World Championship (bronze) -91 kg
  - 2010 IFMA World Championship (bronze) -91 kg
  - 2010 Ukraine muay-thai championship (gold) +91 kg
  - 2009 IFMA World Championship (silver) -91 kg
  - 2009 Ukraine muay-thai championship (gold) +91 kg
  - 2009 IFMA European Championship Junior (gold) +91 kg
- World Combat Games
  - 2010 SportAccord World Combat Games Muaythai (bronze) 91 kg

== Professional boxing record ==
14 fights	13 wins	1 loss
By knockout	8	0
By decision	5	1

No.	Result	Record	Opponent	Type	Round, time	Date	Location	Notes
14	Win	13–1	Mauricio Leon Perez	UD	8	May 15, 2026	Quintana Roo, Chetumal, Mexico	
13	Loss	12–1	Ahmed Krnjić	MD	6	Aug 13, 2025	Kingdom Arena, Riyadh, Saudi Arabia	WBC Grand Prix - Heavyweight - Quarterfinals
12	Win	12–0	Vitaliy Stalchenko	UD	6	Jun 21, 2025	Global Theater Boulevard Riyadh City, Riyadh, Saudi Arabia	WBC Grand Prix - Heavyweight - Round of 16
11	Win	11–0	Lewis Clarke	TKO	3 (6) 2:37	Apr 20, 2025	Global Theater Boulevard Riyadh City, Riyadh, Saudi Arabia	WBC Grand Prix - Heavyweight - Round of 32
10	Win	10–0	Alexander Flores	UD	8	Sep 28, 2024	Pacific Palms Resort, City of Industry, California, U.S.	Won the vacant WBC USA Heavyweight title
9	Win	9–0	Jon Bolden	UD	8	Jun 15, 2024	Emerald Queen Casino, Tacoma, U.S.	
8	Win	8–0	Terrell Jamal Woods	UD	8	May 23, 2024	Soboba Casino, San Jacinto, U.S.	
7	Win	7–0	Jesse Bryan	KO	1 (8), 0:36	Apr 12, 2024	Blue Sport Stable, Superior, Colorado, U.S.	
6	Win	6–0	Antonio Brown	KO	1 (8), 1:44	Mar 23, 2024	LumColor "Phoenix Center", Ontario, California, U.S.	
5	Win	5–0	John Shipman	KO	1 (6), 1:58	Feb 15, 2024	Soboba Casino, San Jacinto, U.S.	
4	Win	4–0	Dante Williams	KO	1 (6), 1:53	Jan 4, 2024	Emerald Queen Casino, Tacoma, U.S.	
3	Win	3–0	Demir Gulamic	TKO	2 (6)	Oct 1, 2022	Gymnase Principiano, Le Cannet, France	
2	Win	2–0	Michael Bassett	RTD	1 (4), 3:00	May 7, 2022	Sartory Sale Koln, Cologne, Germany	
1	Win	1–0	Petar Mrvalj	KO	1 (4), 1:54	Apr 10, 2021	Kyiv, Ukraine	

== Muay Thai and Kickboxing record ==
Professional Kickboxing & Muay Thai Record
13 wins (8 (T) KO's), 8 losses
Date	Result	Opponent	Event	Location	Method	Round	Time
2018-10-06	Loss	(Ukraine) Roman Kryklia	FEA World Grand Prix, Finals	Moldova	Ext.R Decision (Unanimous)	4	3:00
Fight Was For FEA World Grand Prix Tournament Title.
2018-10-06	Win	(Cameroon) Daniel Lentie	FEA World Grand Prix, Semi Finals	Moldova	TKO	1	
2018-04-20	Win	(Brazil) Jhonata Diniz	ACB KB 15: Grand Prix Kitek	Moscow, Russia	Decision	5	3:00
Wins the ACB KB Heavyweight Title.
2017-07-15	Win	(Russia) Vladimir Toktasynov	ACB KB 10: Russia vs. China	Moscow, Russia	KO (Left High Scissor Knee)	3	1:00
2016-12-23	Win	(China) Su Shaobin	Wu Fight	Foshan, Guangdong, China	KO	2	
2016-11-11	Win	(Belgium) Thomas Vanneste	Tatneft Cup 2016 final	Kazan, Russia	Decision (Unanimous)	4	3:00
2016-09-11	Loss	(Belarus) Andrey Gerasimchuk	Kunlun Fight 52 100+ kg 2016 Tournament Final	China	Extra Round Decision	4	3:00
Fight Was For Kunlun Fight 100+ kg 2016 Tournament Title.
2016-09-11	Win	(China) Asihati	Kunlun Fight 52 100+ kg 2016 Tournament Semi-Finals	China	KO (Left High Knee)	1	
2016-06-25	Win	(Belgium) Kirk Krouba	Kunlun Fight 46 100+ kg 2016 Tournament Quarter-Finals	Kunming, China	TKO (punches)	1	
2015-10-03	Win	(Ukraine) Andrey Okhotnik	Kick & Win	Kyiv, Ukraine	TKO	3	
2014-06-14	Loss	(Australia) Paul Slowinski	Monte Carlo Fighting Masters 2014	Monte Carlo, Monaco	Decision (unanimous)	5	3:00
For the WMC Super Heavyweight Title.
2014-03-19	Loss	(Serbia) Stefan Anđelković	Tatneft Arena World Cup 2014 fourth selection 1/8 final (+91 kg)	Kazan, Russia	Ext. R. Decision (Unanimous)	4	3:00
2013-02-23	Loss	(Brazil) Vitor Miranda	Tatneft Arena World Cup 2013 fourth selection 1/8 final (+91 kg)	Kazan, Russia	Decision (Unanimous)	4	3:00
2012-10-20	Win	(Russia) Vladimir Toktasynov	Tatneft Arena World Cup 2012 final (+91 kg)	Kazan, Russia	Decision (Unanimous)	4	3:00
Wins Tatneft Arena World Cup 2012 (+91 kg) title.
2012-07-19	Win	(Algeria) Zinedine Hameur-Lain	Tatneft Arena World Cup 2012 1/2 final (+91 kg)	Kazan, Russia	Decision	3	3:00
2012-07-07	Loss	(Bulgaria) Kostadin Kostov	SuperKombat World Grand Prix III 2012, Semi Finals	Varna, Bulgaria	Decision (Split)	3	3:00
2012-06-02	Win	(Belgium) Yassin Bouanan	Tatneft Arena World Cup 2012 second selection 1/4 final (+91 kg)	Kazan, Russia	KO	2	
2012-01-21	Win	(Japan) Tsutomu Takahagi	Tatneft Arena World Cup 2012 second selection 1/8 final (+91 kg)	Kazan, Russia	TKO	3	
2011-12-17	Win	(China) Zhang Chang	Kungfu VS Muay Thai	Foshan, China	Decision (Unanimous)	5	3:00
2011-11-17	Loss	(Germany) Stefan Leko	SuperKombat: Fight Club, Quarter Finals	Oradea, Romania	Ext. R Decision (Split)	4	3:00
2010-10-22	Loss	(Suriname) Ismael Londt	Tatneft Arena World Cup 2010 second selection 1/4 final (+91 kg)	Kazan, Russia	Ext R. Decision (Unanimous)	4	3:00
2010-03-05	Win	(Russia) Roman Nesterenko	Tatneft Arena World Cup 2010 fourth selection 1/8 final (+80 kg)	Kazan, Russia	TKO	2	
Legend: Win Loss Draw/No contest Notes

Amateur Muay Thai record
Date	Result	Opponent	Event	Location	Method	Round	Time
2018-05-19	Win	(Russia) Kiril Kornilov	IFMA World Championship 2018, Final	Cancun, Mexico	Decision (30:27)	3	3:00
Wins 2018 IFMA World Championships +91kg Gold Medal.
2018-05-19	Win	(Turkey) Buğra Tugay Erdoğan	IFMA World Championship 2018, Semi Final	Cancun, Mexico	Decision (Unanimous)	3	3:00
2018-05-19	Win	(Czech Republic) Michal Reissinger	IFMA World Championship 2018, Quarter Final	Cancun, Mexico	TKO (Outclassed)		
2017-03-14	Win	(Iran) Iraj Azizpour	IFMA World Championship 2017, Final	Minsk, Belarus	Decision (30:27)	3	3:00
Wins 2017 IFMA World Championships +91kg Gold Medal.
2017-03-10	Win	(Sweden) Simon Ogolla	IFMA World Championship 2017, Semi Final	Minsk, Belarus	Decision (30:27)	3	3:00
2017-03-07	Win	(Czech Republic) Michal Reissinger	IFMA World Championship 2017, Quarter Final	Minsk, Belarus	RSCO	2	
2017-03-05	Win	(Turkey) Sayuli Hamdi	IFMA World Championship 2017, 1/8 Final	Minsk, Belarus	KO	1	
2016-05-28	Loss	(Belarus) Andrey Gerasimchuk	2016 IFMA World Championships, Final	Jönköping, Sweden	Decision	3	3:00
Wins 2016 IFMA World Championships +91kg Silver Medal.
2016-05-28	Win	(Russia) Kirill Kornilov	2016 IFMA World Championships, Semi Final	Jönköping, Sweden	Decision	3	3:00
2015-08-	Loss	(Russia) Kirill Kornilov	2015 IFMA World Championships, Semi Final	Bangkok, Thailand	Decision	3	3:00
Wins 2015 IFMA World Championships +91kg Bronze Medal.
2015-08-	Win	(Turkey) Mustafa Kucik	2015 IFMA World Championships, Quarter Final	Bangkok, Thailand	TKO	1	
2015-03-	Win	(Turkey) Furkan Cigrik	2015 IFMA-FISU Muaythai University World Cup, Final	Bangkok, Thailand	Decision	3	3:00
Wins 2015 IFMA-FISU Muaythai University World Cup -67kg Gold Medal.
2013-07-	Win	(Czech Republic) Lubos Rauser	2013 IFMA European Championship, Final	Lisbon, Portugal	Decision	4	2:00
Wins 2013 IFMA European Championships +91kg Gold Medal.
2013-07-	Win	(Russia) Semen Shelepov	2013 IFMA European Championship, Semi Final	Lisbon, Portugal	Decision	4	2:00
2013-07-	Win	(Sweden) Simon Ogolla	2013 IFMA European Championship, Quarter Final	Lisbon, Portugal	Decision	4	2:00
2012-09-13	Win	(Estonia) Bokan Andrei	2012 IFMA World Championship, Final	Saint Petersburg, Russia	Decision	4	2:00
Wins 2012 IFMA World Championships +91kg Gold Medal.
2012-09-11	Win	(Russia) Semen Shelepov	2012 IFMA World Championship, Semi Finals	Saint Petersburg, Russia	Decision	4	2:00
2012-09-10	Win	(Uzbekistan) Jobirbek Tashpulatov	2012 IFMA World Championship, Quarter Finals	Saint Petersburg, Russia	Decision	4	2:00
2012-05-	Win	(Belarus) Alexey Kudin	IFMA European Championship 2012, Final	Antalya, Turkey	Decision	4	2:00
Wins 2012 IFMA European Championships +91kg Gold Medal.
2012-05-	Win	(Russia) Alexander Vezehvatov	IFMA European Championship 2012, Semi Final	Antalya, Turkey	Decision	4	2:00
2012-05-	Win	(Romania) Razvan Ghita	IFMA European Championship 2012, Quarter Final	Antalya, Turkey	Decision	4	2:00
2011-09-25	Loss	(Slovenia) Franc Grajs	I.F.M.A. World Championships 2011, Semi Final	Tashkent, Uzbekistan	Decision	4	2:00
Wins 2011 IFMA World Championships -91kg Bronze Medal.
2011-09-22	Win	(Russia) Makav Dzhavatkhak	2011 IFMA World Championships, Quarter Finals	Tashkent, Uzbekistan	Decision	4	2:00
2011-05-	Loss	(Belarus) Dzianis Hancharonak	2011 IFMA European Championships	Antalya, Turkey	Decision	4	2:00
2010-12-	Loss	(Czech Republic) Ondřej Hutník	2010 I.F.M.A. World Muaythai Championships, Semi Finals	Bangkok, Thailand	Decision	4	2:00
Wins 2010 IFMA World Championships -91kg Bronze Medal.
2010-12-	Win	(Uzbekistan) Zhazio Mirzamuhamedov	2010 I.F.M.A. World Muaythai Championships, Quarter Finals	Bangkok, Thailand	Decision	4	2:00
2010-09-	Loss	(China) Wang Wenzhong	2010 World Combat Games, Semi Final	Beijing, China	Decision	4	2:00
Wins 2010 World Combat Games -91kg Bronze Medal.
2010-09-	Win	(Russia) Semen Shelepov	2010 World Combat Games, Quarter Final	Beijing, China	Decision	4	2:00
2009-12-	Loss	(Belarus) Dzianis Hancharonak	2009 IFMA World Championships, Final	Bangkok, Thailand	Decision	4	2:00
Wins 2009 IFMA World Championships -91kg Silver Medal.
2009-12-	Win	(Sweden) Abdoulie Joof	2009 IFMA World Championships, Semi Final	Bangkok, Thailand	Decision	4	2:00
Legend: Win Loss Draw/No contest Notes

== Exhibition boxing record ==
1 Wins, 1 Losses, 0 Draws
Res.	Record	Opponent	Type	Rd., Time	Date	Location	Notes
Loss	1–1	(Belgium) Ali Baghouz	UD	3 (3)	2013-02-08	(Portugal) Lisbon	Bigger's Better semi finals.
Win	1-0	(Romania) Tiberiu Porcoi	SD	3 (3)	2013-02-08	(Portugal) Lisbon	Bigger's Better quarter finals.

== See also ==
- List of male kickboxers
