= Diogo Calado =

Portuguese male kickboxer

- Born: 17 July 1990 (age 36); Cascais, Portugal
- Nickname: The King D
- Nationality: Portuguese
- Height: 1.79 m (5 ft 10 1/2 in)
- Weight: 75 kg (165 lb; 11 st 11 lb)
- Division: Super Middleweight
- Style: Muay Thai
- Stance: Southpaw
- Fighting out of: Lisbon, Portugal
- Team: DinaMite Team
- Trainer: Dina Pedro
- Years active: 2004 – present

Kickboxing record
- Total: 54
- Wins: 37
- By knockout: 11
- Losses: 16
- By knockout: 5
- No contests: 1

Other information
- Website: https://www.instagram.com/the.king.d/

Diogo Calado (born 17 July 1990) is a Portuguese kickboxer and rapper who began practicing Shito-Ryu Karate at the age of 7. He is now a full-time Muay Thai and kickboxer, who has been professionally competing since 2008. He is a former Enfusion -75 kg World champion.

== Fighting career ==
Calado won his first major title, the ISKA European 77 kg belt, in 2012, with a first-round TKO of Mike Clarke.

Diogo Calado challenged for the WBC Muaythai World Light Heavyweight title, which was at the time vacant. Calado lost to Cheick Sidibé by second-round TKO due to a cut on his eyebrow.

Calado went on a two-fight losing streak during his next fights. He first lost a decision to Yodsanklai Fairtex, followed by a decision loss to Panom Topkingboxing. He snapped the losing streak with a first-round KO of Lofti Talbi, which earned him the ISKA European 75 kg title.

He fought Jiang Chunpeng at Kunlun Fight 22, winning the fight by a third-round KO. After winning a decision against Sameer Siraj, he fought Yohan Lidon, who defeated Calado in a very controversial split decision.

Calado began a five-fight winning streak with a third-round TKO win over Raphaël Llodra to win the Enfusion 75 kg Championship. He next won the WBC Muaythai European title with a decision win over Kamel Mezatni. He then fought during Kunlun Fight 41, where he won a decision against Parviz Abdullayev. At Enfusion 40, he won a decision against Jose Bello.

Calado next took part in the Kunlun Fight 47 Tournament. In the quarter-finals, Diogo won a decision against Alim Nabiev. In the semi-finals, he fought Zhang Yang and lost a decision. Afterwards, he fought the future World Boxing Council Muaythai Muaythai Super Middleweight champion Hamza Ngoto and lost by unanimous decision.

He fought the Albanian kickboxer Shkodran Veseli during the IFN II. Calado won the fight by a unanimous decision.

He made his first title defense against Aziz Kallah. He won the fight by a unanimous decision.

In 2017 Diogo fought Brad Riddell for the inaugural Strikers League 77 kg title. Calado won the fight by a unanimous decision.

Calado made his second Enfusion title defense during Enfusion 54, when he faced Berat Aliu. Calado won the fight by a fourth round head kick KO.

Diogo Calado lost a unanimous decision to Arthit Hanchana during Kunlun Fight 66, in the quarter-final round of the Kunlun Fight 75 kg tournament.

He participated in the eight man Enfusion Abu Dhabi tournament. He lost in the first, quarter final round, to the future Enfusion 75 kg champion Endy Semeleer.

Diogo faced Karim Ghajji during Capital Fight 3. The fight went into a fourth round, where Calado won a decision.

Calado fought in the 72.5 kg tournament during Enfusion 72 tournament. He defeated Edye Ruiz in the semi-final by decision, and Nayanesh Ayman by decision in the finals.

He participated in the Enfusion Al Shiraa 72.5 kg World Grand Prix. In the quarter-finals he faced Zhu Baotong and won a unanimous decision. He then fought Superbon Banchamek in the tournament semi finals and lost a unanimous decision.

Diogo Calado fought Maximo Suarez during Enfusion 81 in Tenerife. He won the fight by a first-round knockout.

Calado fought Davide Armanini during the May 2019 Oktagon event. Calado lost the fight by KO.

In December 2021 he participated in IFMA World championships. He fought on the -81 kg weight category where he defeated Cristiano Zachenttin from Brasil on the 16th finals, Ondrej Malina from Czech Republic on the 8th finals, he passed through the quarter-finals due to a no show from the fighter from Denmark and then lost on points on the semi-finals versus Vasyl Sorokin from Ukraine winning a bronze medal.

Due to his bronze medal on the last IFMA World championships, Diogo was invited to fight on The World Games 2022 edition, on the 81 kg Muay Thai category. He won a silver medal, losing in the final versus Aaron Ortiz from the US on a very controversial decision.

In 2024 Diogo did his MMA debut winning by submission on the first round.

== Outside the ring ==
He joined Kwalla Music Portugal team in 2019 and released his first songs during the 2020 COVID-19 pandemic, going by the name tKD.

== Championships and accomplishments ==
- International Sport Karate Association
  - 2012 ISKA European Super Middleweight 77 kg Champion
  - 2014 ISKA European Middleweight 75 kg Champion
- World Boxing Council Muaythai
  - 2015 World Boxing Council Muaythai European Middleweight 72.5 kg Champion
- Enfusion
  - 2015 Enfusion 75 kg World Champion (two successful title defenses)
  - 2017 Enfusion 75 kg Tournament Winner
  - 2018 Enfusion Al Shiraa 72.5 kg World Grand Prix runner-up
- Kunlun Fight
  - 2016 Kunlun Fight 75 kg Tournament semi-finalist
- Strikers League
  - 2017 Strikers League 77 kg World Championship
- World Association Kickboxing Organizations
  - 2007 Junior European championship 75 kg bronze medal
- International Federation of Muay Thai Associations
  - 2007 Junior World championship 75 kg gold medal
  - 2008 Junior European championship 75 kg silver medal
  - 2016 World cup Elite 75 kg silver medal
  - 2017 World championship Elite 75 kg silver medal
  - 2021 World championship Elite 81 kg bronze medal
  - 2022 The World Games 81 kg silver medal

== Mixed martial arts record ==
Professional record breakdown
1 match	1 win	0 losses
By submission	1	0

Res.	Record	Opponent	Method	Event	Date	Round	Time	Location	Notes
Win	1–0	Arie Heskel Flames	Submission (foot lock)	FIGHTER: Machado vs. Kingani	February 25, 2024	1	1:44	Montijo, Portugal	Welterweight debut

== Muay Thai and kickboxing record ==
Professional Muay Thai record
37 wins (11 (T)KOs), 16 losses, 0 draws, 1 no contest
Date	Result	Opponent	Event	Location	Method	Round	Time
2019-5-25	Loss	(Italy) Davide Armanini	Oktagon	Monza, Italy	KO	1	0:27
2019-3-30	Win	(Spain) Maximo Suarez	Enfusion 81	Tenerife, Spain	KO	1	
2018-12-7	Loss	(Thailand) Superbon Banchamek	Enfusion 77, Tournament Finals	Abu Dhabi, United Arab Emirates	Decision (unanimous)	3	3:00
2018-12-7	Win	(China) Zhu Baotong	Enfusion 76, Tournament Semi-finals	Abu Dhabi, United Arab Emirates	Decision (unanimous)	3	3:00
2018-10-6	Win	(Spain) Nayanesh Ayman	Enfusion 72, Tournament Final	Madrid, Spain	Decision (unanimous)	3	3:00
Wins the 72.5 kg qualifying tournament to Abu Dhabi.
2018-10-6	Win	(Spain) Edye Ruiz	Enfusion 72, Tournament Semi-final	Madrid, Spain	Decision (unanimous)	3	3:00
2018-5-5	Win	(France) Karim Ghajji	Capital Fights 3	Paris, France	Decision (unanimous)	4	3:00
2017-12-8	Loss	(Netherlands) Endy Semeleer	Enfusion 58	Abu Dhabi, United Arab Emirates	KO	3	
2017-11-5	Loss	(Thailand) Arthit Hanchana	Kunlun Fight 66, Tournament Quarter-Finals	Wuhan, China	Decision (unanimous)	3	3:00
2017-10-7	Win	(Germany) Berat Aliu	Enfusion 54	Ludwigsburg, Germany	KO (head kick)	4	
Defends the Enfusion 75 kg title.
2017-05-27	Win	(New Zealand) Brad Riddell	Strikers League	Carcavelos, Portugal	Decision (unanimous)	3	3:00
Wins the Strikers League 77 kg title.
2017-03-24	Win	(Morocco) Aziz Kallah	Enfusion 48	Abu Dhabi, United Arab Emirates	Decision (unanimous)	5	3:00
Defends the Enfusion 75 kg title.
2017-02-25	Win	(Albania) Shkodran Veseli	Illyrian Fight Night II	Winterthur, Switzerland	Decision (unanimous)	5	3:00
2016-11-19	Loss	(France) Hamza Ngoto	Fight Night Radikal Gold	Charleville-Mézières, France	Decision (unanimous)	3	3:00
2016-7-10	Loss	(China) Zhang Yang	Kunlun Fight 47, Tournament Semi-finals	Nanjing, China	Decision (unanimous)	3	3:00
2016-7-10	Win	(Azerbaijan) Alim Nabiev	Kunlun Fight 47, Tournament Quarter-finals	Nanjing, China	Decision (unanimous)	3	3:00
2016-6-4	Win	(Spain) Jose Bello	Enfusion 40	Gran Canaria, Spain	Decision (unanimous)	3	3:00
2016-4-8	Win	(Azerbaijan) Parviz Abdullayev	Kunlun Fight 41	Nanjing, China	Decision (unanimous)	3	3:00
2015-12-12	Win	(France) Kamel Mezatni	Diamond League	Lisbon, Portugal	Decision (unanimous)	5	3:00
Wins the WBC Muaythai European 72.5 kg title.
2015-12-12	Win	(France) Raphaël Llodra	Enfusion 33	Martigny, Switzerland	TKO (3 knockdowns)	3	
Wins the Enfusion 75 kg World title.
2015-6-12	Loss	(France) Yohan Lidon	Strike Fight	Lyon, France	Decision (unanimous)	3	3:00
2015-5-9	Win	(Sweden) Sameer Siraj	Muay Thai Arena 6	Gothenburg, Sweden	Decision (unanimous)	3	3:00
2015-4-12	Win	(China) Chunpeng Jiang	Kunlun Fight 22	Hunan, China	KO	3	
2015-2-28	Loss	(Thailand) Saiyok Pumpanmuang	Ring War	Sesto San Giovanni, Italy	TKO (cut)	2	
For the WMO 72.5 kg title.
2014-11-15	Win	(France) Lotfi Talbi	Memorial Jorge Martins – La Nuit des Champions	Martigny, Switzerland	KO	1	
Wins the ISKA 75 kg title.
2014-7-6	Loss	(Thailand) Panom Topkingboxing	Max Muay Thai	Pattaya, Thailand	Decision (unanimous)	3	3:00
2014-4-6	Loss	(Thailand) Yodsanklai Fairtex	Thai Fight	Sattahip, Thailand	Decision (unanimous)	3	3:00
2014-2-22	Win	(Spain) Ruben Lee	La Noche Del Luchador 2	Torre de Benagalbón, Spain	Decision (unanimous)	3	3:00
2014-2-1	Loss	(France) Cheick Sidibé	Grande Soirée de la Boxe	Tours, France	TKO (cut)	2	
For the WBC Muaythai World title.
2013-11-16	Win	(Netherlands) Mohamed Sariri	Memorial Jorge Martins 9	Martigny, Switzerland	KO	4	
2013-9-28	Win	(Thailand) Jaochalam Chatnakanok	Chitalada Showdown V	Tampere, Finland	KO	4	
2013-6-1	Win	(Portugal) Nino Evora	Casino Estoril	Lisbon, Portugal	Decision (unanimous)	5	3:00
2013-4-13	Win	(Portugal) Nino Evora	K-1 World Max Elimination	Loures, Portugal	Decision (unanimous)	3	3:00
2012-11-17	Loss	(Spain) Carlos La Loba	Muay Thai	Santa Cruz de Tenerife, Spain	TKO	4	
2012-10-20	Win	(United Kingdom) Mike Clarke	Xtreme Combat	Leeds, United Kingdom	TKO	1	
Wins the ISKA European 77 kg title.
2011-11-27	Win	(Portugal) Paulo Telmo	WMC Fight Night 2	São Domingos de Rana, Portugal	Decision (unanimous)	5	3:00
2011-10-8	Win	(Portugal) Pedro Fula	WMC Fight Night	São Domingos de Rana, Portugal	TKO	3	
2011-7-23	Win	(Portugal) Francisco Matos	Will 2 Fight	Lisbon, Portugal	KO	3	
2011-5-21	Win	(Portugal) Ricardo Madeira	Will 2 Fight	Lisbon, Portugal	KO	1	
2010-3-27	Loss	(Switzerland) Shemsi Beqiri	WKA World Championship	Geneva, Switzerland	Decision (unanimous)	5	3:00
For the WKA World 72.5 kg title.
2009-11-09	Win	(Spain) Ricardo Virgo	Gala Spain	Spain	KO	1	
2009-03-01	Win	(United Kingdom) Ian Barry	Gala Spain	Spain	KO	2	
2008-12-6	Loss	(Spain) Abraham Roqueni	Campeonato Del Mundo De Kick Boxing	Santa Cruz de Tenerife, Spain	Decision (unanimous)	5	3:00
Legend: Win Loss Draw/no contest Notes

Amateur Muay Thai record
Date	Result	Opponent	Event	Location	Method	Round	Time
2022-07-16	Loss	(United States) Aaron Ortiz	World Games 2022, Final	Bangkok, Thailand	Decision (29:28)	3	
Wins 2022 World Games Muay Thai -81kg Silver Medal.
2022-07-16	Win	(Mexico) Miguel Angel Padilla	World Games 2022, Semi-final	Bangkok, Thailand	Decision (29:28)	3	
2021-12-10	Loss	(Ukraine) Vasyl Sorokin	2021 IFMA World Championships, Semi-final	Bangkok, Thailand	Decision (30:27)	3	
Wins 2021 IFMA World Championships -81kg Bronze Medal.
2021-12-09	Win	(Denmark) Frederik Emil Beenfeldt Winter	2021 IFMA World Championships, Quarter-final	Bangkok, Thailand	Forfeit	3	
2021-12-08	Win	(Czech Republic) Ondrej Malina	2021 IFMA World Championships, Second Round	Bangkok, Thailand	Decision (30:27)	3	
2021-12-06	Win	(Brazil) Cristiano Zanchettin	2021 IFMA World Championships, First Round	Bangkok, Thailand	Decision (29:28)	3	
2018-07-01	Loss	(Lithuania) Martynas Jasiunas	2018 IFMA European Championships, First Round	Paris, France	Decision (29:28)	3	
2017-07-28	Loss	(Belarus) Vitaly Gurkov	I.F.M.A. World Games 2017, Quarter-finals -75 kg	Poland	Decision	3	
2017-05-12	Loss	(Russia) Ivan Grigorev	2017 IFMA World Championships, Final	Minsk, Belarus	TKO	3	
Wins 2017 IFMA World Championships -75kg Silver Medal.
2017-05-10	Win	(Russia) Vadim Loparev	2017 IFMA World Championships, Semi-final	Minsk, Belarus	Decision (29:28)	3	
2017-05-08	Win	(Belarus) Vitaly Gurkov	2017 IFMA World Championships, Quarter-final	Minsk, Belarus	Decision (29:28)	3	
2016-11-26	Loss	(Russia) Ivan Grigorev	IFMA World Cup 2016 in Kazan, Final	Kazan, Russia	Decision (split)	3	
Wins the 2016 IFMA World Cup -75kg Silver Medal.
2016-11-24	Win	(Iran) Mohammad Ghaedibardeh	IFMA World Cup 2016 in Kazan, Semi-final	Kazan, Russia	Decision	3	
Legend: Win Loss Draw/no contest Notes

== See also ==
- List of male kickboxers
