= Jiang Hua (businessman) =

Chinese fight promoter

Hua Jiang
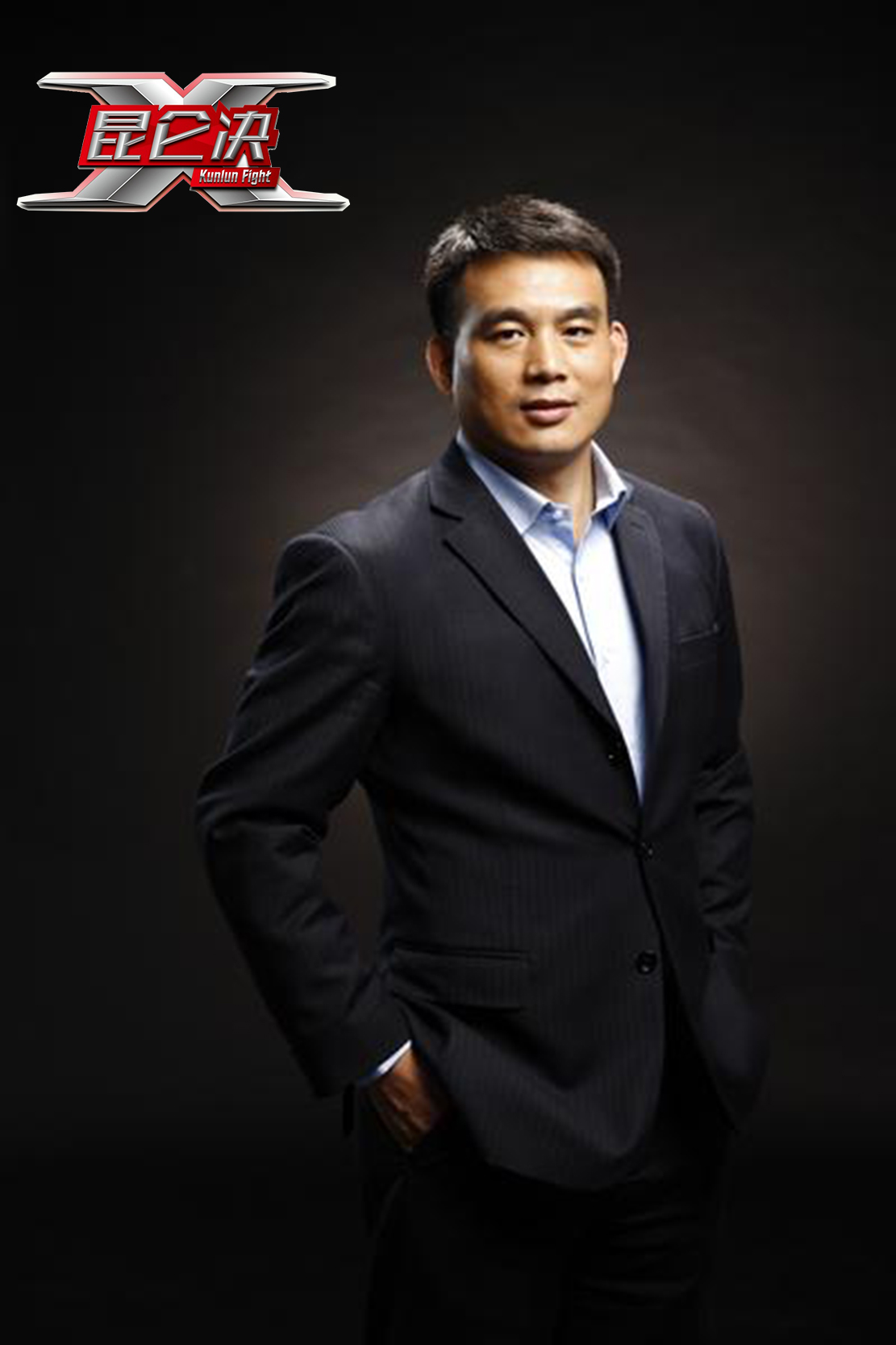
- Born: 1978 (age 46–47); Zhoukou, Henan, China
- Occupation: Businessman
- Known for: Kunlun Fight

Jiang Hua (Chinese: 姜华; pinyin: Jiāng huá, born 1978) is a Chinese kickboxing promoter and businessman. He is the founder of Kunlun Fight. Jiang was born in Zhoukou, China.

== Career ==
Jiang is the chairman of Kunsun Media, the parent company of Kunlun Fight, which started in 2014 and was broadcast on Qinghai Television.

Jiang was also associated with producing Gong Shou Dao, a new form of tai chi competitions started by actor Jet Li and Alibaba founder Jack Ma.
