= Kunlun Fight World Combat Sports Center =

Indoor sports venue in Beijing, China

- Interactive map of Kunlun Fight World Combat Sports Center
- Address: 2 Hongfu Road, Daxing District, Beijing
- Location: Beijing, China
- Coordinates: 39°47′16.8″N 116°20′24.2″E

Construction
- Opened: 2016

Tenant
- Kunlun Fight

Kunlun Fight World Combat Sports Center (Chinese: 昆仑决世界搏击中心; pinyin: Kūnlún jué shìjiè bójí zhōngxīn) is an indoor arena and a large gym in Beijing, China. The venue is a regular host to fight sports and other sporting events.
