= Kunlun Fight =

Chinese kickboxing promotion

- Type: Private
- Industry: Kickboxing promotion
- Founded: January 2014; 12 years ago
- Founder: Jiang Hua
- Headquarters: Beijing, China
- Key people: Jiang Hua (founder)
- Owner: Kunsun Media

Kunlun Fight (KLF) (Chinese: 昆仑决; pinyin: Kūnlún Jué) is a kickboxing promotion headquartered in Beijing, China. It debuted in 2014 and is regarded as one of the top kickboxing promotions in the world. Events are broadcast on Jiangsu Television domestically and on various regional and international channels.

The first event was held in Pattaya, Thailand on January 25, 2014. The promotion has since held over 20 events each year.

== History ==
The first event in Pattaya, Thailand on January 25, 2014, included super fights and a 4-man kickboxing tournament with Andrei Kulebin, Petsanguan Luktupfah, Guo Dongwang and Umar Semata. After the inaugural event the promotion has held events in Thailand two more times.

On June 7, 2015, it was announced that Kunlun Fight had signed one of the most successful and famous 70 kg kickboxers in history, 2 time K-1 World Max Champion Buakaw Banchamek to an exclusive 6-fight contract. Buakaw has continued fighting in the promotion beyond the original 6-fight contract.

In 2015, the promotion organized Kunlun Fight 25 in Banská Bystrica, Slovakia. The event included a Lethwei superfight at between Burmese Lethwei star Too Too and local Slovak fighter Igor Danis at 75 kg in the event organized in partnership with the Slovakia Lethwei Association. The event was billed as the European Premiere of Lethwei marking the first Lethwei fights hosted in Europe. Too Too dominated the match and inflicted heavy damage to his opponent. The match was ruled a draw under Traditional rules.

In March 2016, Kunlun Fight finished series B financing from Morningside Ventures, IDG Capital Partners and Northern Light Venture Capital. The round of financing valued the company at over US$350 million, making Kunlun Fight the most valuable combat sports company in China. Prior to B+ round of financing in Q1 2017 the company was reportedly valued at over US$500 million.

Multiple Kunlun Fight branded gyms and event venues exist like the Kunlun Fight World Combat Sports Center in Beijing and the Kunlun Fight Stadium in Tongling, Anhui, China.

=== 70 kg tournaments ===
Kunlun Fight holds a yearly 70 kg world championship tournament.

In 2014 the inaugural 16-man tournament was won by Dzianis Zuev who defeated Victor Nagbe in the final.

For 2015 the tournament was expanded to 64-man and Sitthichai Sitsongpeenong emerged as the champion from a field of fighters including multiple kickboxing champions and highly ranked fighters such as Marat Grigorian, Enriko Gogokhia, Enriko Kehl, Davit Kiria, Murthel Groenhart, Andy Souwer, Yodsanklai Fairtex, Dzhabar Askerov, Superbon Banchamek, Amancio Paraschiv, Chingiz Allazov, Aikpracha Meenayothin and the 2014 tournament winner Dzianis Zuev.

The 2016 tournament was won by Superbon Banchamek, who also beat the winner of the previous tournament Sitthichai Sitsongpeenong in the quarterfinals.

The 2017 tournament champion was Marat Grigorian who beat the 2016 tournament winner Superbon Banchamek in the final.

The 2018 tournament was won by Davit Kiria.

The 2019 tournament was intended to be held on 31 December 2019 in Wuzhishan City, Hainan, China, but was postponed. The tournament was rescheduled for March, 8 in Wuzhishan City, but the event had to be cancelled due to the 2020 coronavirus pandemic ban on live sporting events.

The 70 kg tournament was announced to be coming back for 2024. It is scheduled to start April 27 on Kunlun Fight 97 in Beijing.

=== Kunlun Combat Professional League ===
On September 22, 2018, Kunlun Fight launched a new line of 2nd tier events called Kunlun Combat League. The league has 16 teams and fights are fought in 6 different weight classes. The league events are held mostly at a Kunlun Fight venue in Tongling. 71 KCL events were held during the first qualification season between September 22 and December 31, 2018.

In its present format, the league begins in March with 16 teams split into 2 groups for a regular season. The highest scoring teams from both groups proceed to a knockout phase that culminates with the final event at the end of the year.

In 2019 the league was renamed to Kunlun Combat Professional League (KCPL) and started its first full season on March 16, 2019. The first season was won by team Shenzhen, who beat team Shenyang in the finals held on December 24, 2019, in Yiwu, China.

For the 2020 season, the intended March start date for the league was disrupted by the 2020 coronavirus pandemic. The 2020 season was rescheduled to start in mid-May without live audiences present at the events.

=== Kunlun Fight City Hero ===
Started in 2016, a 3rd tier series of events with a mix of professional and amateur fights.

== Broadcast coverage ==
Some current broadcasters include Jiangsu Television and ByteDance platforms Douyin and Xigua Video.

Some past broadcasters include Fox Sports Asia and Kix in various countries in Asia, RMC Sport 4, Fight Network, FightBox in multiple countries internationally, Workpoint TV in Thailand, HKSTV in Hong Kong and Taiwan (2016), Anhui Television in China (2017) and Eurosport. In 2017 Kunlun Fight MMA events were broadcast monthly in China on CCTV-5.

== Rules ==
Kunlun Fight mostly holds fights under kickboxing rules, but also under MMA rules. Some Kun Khmer, Muay Thai, Boxing and Lethwei fights have also been held on Kunlun Fight events.

◾Kickboxing rules: no clinch for survival, active clinch with knees, no throws, no elbows, a yellow card forfeits 25% of the fight purse and earns a 1-point deduction, a red card is a disqualification.

◾Mixed martial arts rules: Unified Rules of Mixed Martial Arts

◾Muay thai rules: knees are allowed to the body, legs and the head, throws and clinch are allowed, elbows are allowed to the body, legs and head, a yellow card forfeits 25% of the fight purse and earns a 1-point deduction, a red card is a disqualification.

== Weight classes ==
| Weight Classes | Kilograms(kg) | Pounds(lbs) |
|---|---|---|
| Strawweight | 51 | 115 |
| Flyweight | 57 | 125 |
| Bantamweight | 61 | 135 |
| Featherweight | 66 | 145 |
| Lightweight | 70 | 155 |
| Welterweight | 77 | 170 |
| Middleweight | 84 | 185 |
| Light Heavyweight | 93 | 205 |
| Heavyweight | Unlimited | Unlimited |

== Champions ==
=== Kickboxing champions ===
==== Tournament champions ====
| Weight Class | Champion | Runner-up | Event | Date | Tournament Bracket |
|---|---|---|---|---|---|
| 2014 70 kg World Championship Tournament | (Belarus) Dzianis Zuev | (Australia) Victor Nagbe | Kunlun Fight 13 | November 16, 2014 | 70 kg World Max Tournament 2014 bracket |
| 2015 100+ kg World Championship Tournament | (Netherlands) Jahfarr Wilnis | (Egypt) Hesdy Gerges | Kunlun Fight 26 | June 7, 2015 | Super Heavyweight Tournament 2015 bracket |
| 2016 Female 52 kg World Championship Tournament | (China) E Meidie | (France) Anissa Meksen | Kunlun Fight 32 | October 28, 2015 | Female 52 kg Tournament 2015 bracket |
| 2015 80 kg World Championship Tournament | (Ukraine) Artur Kyshenko | (Belarus) Dmitry Valent | Kunlun Fight 35 | December 19, 2015 | 80 kg Tournament 2015 bracket |
| 2015 70 kg World Championship Tournament | (Thailand) Sitthichai Sitsongpeenong | (Ukraine) Enriko Gogokhia | Kunlun Fight 37 | January 23, 2016 | 70 kg World Max Tournament 2015 bracket |
| 2016 75 kg World Championship Tournament | (China) Zheng Zhaoyu | (China) Zhang Yang | Kunlun Fight 47 | July 10, 2016 | 75 Kg Tournament 2016 bracket |
| 2016 65 kg World Championship Tournament | (China) Wei Ninghui | (France) Abdellah Ezbiri | Kunlun Fight 51 | September 10, 2016 | 65 Kg Tournament 2016 bracket |
| 2016 100+ kg World Championship Tournament | (Belarus) Andrei Gerasimchuk | (Ukraine) Tsotne Rogava | Kunlun Fight 52 | September 11, 2016 | |
| 2016 80 kg World Championship Tournament | (Russia) Alexander Stetsurenko | (Belarus) Dmitry Valent | Kunlun Fight 55 | December 10, 2016 | |
| 2016 70 kg World Championship Tournament | (Thailand) Superbon Banchamek | (Thailand) Jomthong Chuwattana | Kunlun Fight 56 | January 1, 2017 | 70 kg World Max Tournament 2016 bracket |
| 2017 70 kg World Championship Tournament | (Armenia) Marat Grigorian | (Thailand) Superbon Banchamek | Kunlun Fight 69 | February 4, 2018 | 70 kg World Championship Tournament bracket |

==== One night tournament champions ====
| Weight Class | Champion | Runner-up | Event | Date | Tournament Bracket |
|---|---|---|---|---|---|
| 4-Man 67 kg tournament | (Thailand) Petsangnuan Luktupfah | (Belarus) Andrei Kulebin | Kunlun Fight 1 | January 25, 2014 | 67 kg tournament bracket |
| 4-Man 80 kg tournament | (Canada) Simon Marcus | (Thailand) Vehas Topking | Kunlun Fight 2 | February 16, 2014 | 80kg tournament bracket |
| Female 52 kg tournament | (Netherlands) Jemyma Betrian | (China) E Meidie | Kunlun Fight 3 | March 30, 2014 | Female 52 kg tournament bracket |
| 4-Man 95 kg tournament | (France) Massinissa Hamaili | (Slovenia) Ivan Bartek | Kunlun Fight 4 | April 27, 2014 | 95 kg tournament bracket |
| 4-Man 70 kg tournament | (Australia) Victor Nagbe | (China) Li Zikai | Kunlun Fight 5 | June 1, 2014 | 70 kg tournament bracket |
| 4-Man 100 kg tournament | (Belarus) Andrei Gerasimchuk | (Ukraine) Dmitry Bezus | Kunlun Fight 6 | June 29, 2014 | 100 kg tournament bracket |
| 4-Man 75 kg tournament | (China) Xu Zhenguang | (Belarus) Kiryl Chanka | Kunlun Fight 8 | August 24, 2014 | 75 kg tournament bracket |
| Female 60 kg tournament | (Kyrgyzstan) Valentina Shevchenko | (Russia) Irina Mazepa | Kunlun Fight 9 | August 31, 2014 | Female 60 kg tournament bracket |
| 4-Man 95 kg tournament | (Belarus) Andrei Gerasimchuk | (China) Wang Chongyang | Kunlun Fight 10 | September 13, 2014 | 95 kg tournament bracket |
| 4-Man 65 kg tournament | (China) Yang Zhuo | (Thailand) Phosa Nopphorn | Kunlun Fight 12 | October 26, 2014 | 60 kg tournament bracket |
| 4-Man 75 kg tournament | (China) Nuerla Mulali | (China) Wang Yuhu | Kunlun Fight 34 | November 21, 2015 | 75 kg tournament bracket |
| 8-Man 61.5 kg tournament | (Thailand) Saeksan Or. Kwanmuang | (China) Wang Wenfeng | Kunlun Fight 66 | November 5, 2017 | |
| 8-Man 100+ kg tournament | (Ukraine) Roman Kryklia | (Iran) Iraj Azizpour | Kunlun Fight 80 | February 24, 2019 | |
| 8-Man 75 kg tournament | (Belarus) Vitaly Gurkov | (Thailand) Saiyok Pumpanmuang | Kunlun Fight 81 | July 27, 2019 | |
| 8-Man 61 kg tournament | (Iran) Ali Zarinfar | (China) Jianglong Li | Kunlun Fight 94 | January 19, 2024 | |

==== Women's lightweight champions ====
-60 kg (-132.3 lb)

| No. | Name | Event | Date | Defenses |
|---|---|---|---|---|
| 2 | (China) Wang Cong def. Valentina Shevchenko | Kunlun Fight 33; Changde, China | October 31, 2015 | |
| 1 | (Kyrgyzstan) Valentina Shevchenko def. Irina Mazepa | Kunlun Fight 9 Shangqiu, China | August 31, 2014 | 1. def. Chali Bassinah at Kunlun Fight 11 on October 5, 2014 |

=== Muaythai champions ===
==== Middleweight championship ====
-70 kg (-154.3 lb)

| No. | Name | Event | Date | Defenses |
|---|---|---|---|---|
| 1 | (Thailand) Buakaw Banchamek def. Dylan Salvador | Kunlun Fight 53; Beijing, China | September 24, 2016 | |

=== MMA champions ===
==== Middleweight championship ====
84 kg (185 lbs); division was formerly 79 kg (175 lbs) until 2017

| No. | Name | Event | Date | Defenses |
|---|---|---|---|---|
| 1 | (China) Wang Sai def. Sergey Proskuryakov | Kunlun Fight 36; Shanghai, China | January 9, 2016 | 1. def. Horiuchi Yasuhiro at Kunlun Fight - Cage Fight Series 6 on October 21, 2016 |

==== Welterweight championship ====
77 kg (170 lbs); division was formerly 75 kg (165 lbs) until 2017

| No. | Name | Event | Date | Defenses |
|---|---|---|---|---|
| 2 | (China) Zhang Lipeng def. Beibit Nazarov | Kunlun Fight 37; Sanya, China | January 23, 2016 | 1. def. Takashi Noto at Kunlun Fight 43 on April 26, 2016 |
| 1 | (Kazakhstan) Beibit Nazarov def. Bruno Amorim | Kunlun Fight - Cage Fight Series 2 Almaty, Kazakhstan | April 4, 2015 | 1. def. Wu Haotian at Kunlun Fight - Cage Fight Series 3 on June 7, 2015; 2. def. Massimo Capusella at Kunlun Fight - Cage Fight Series 4 on October 4, 2015 |

==== Flyweight championship ====
| No. | Name | Event | Date | Defenses |
|---|---|---|---|---|
| 1 | (Spain) Oscar Suarez Fleitas def. Zhang Meixuan | Kunlun Fight MMA 14 | August 28, 2017 | |

==== Female strawweight championship ====
| No. | Name | Event | Date | Defenses |
|---|---|---|---|---|
| 1 | (China) Weili Zhang def. Maira De Souza | Kunlun Fight 53; Shanghai, China | September 24, 2016 | 1. def. Karla Benitez at Kunlun Fight MMA 7 on December 15, 2016 |

== Notable fighters ==
=== Kickboxing ===
==== 67 kg (143.3 lb) and under ====
- (Thailand) Kaew Fairtex
- (China) Wei Ninghui
- (China) Yang Zhuo
- (France) Abdellah Ezbiri
- (France) Fabio Pinca
- (China) Wang Wenfeng
- (Japan) Tetsuya Yamato
- (Morocco) Ilias Bulaid
- (Thailand) Saeksan Or. Kwanmuang
- (Japan) Taiga Kawabe
- (South Korea) Lee Sung-hyun
- (Netherlands) Massaro Glunder
- (Thailand) Lerdsila Chumpairtour

==== 70 kg (154.3 lb) ====
- (Thailand) Buakaw Banchamek
- (Thailand) Superbon Banchamek
- (Thailand) Jomthong Chuwattana
- (Thailand) Yodsanklai Fairtex
- (Ukraine) Enriko Gogokhia
- (Armenia) Marat Grigorian
- (Suriname) Murthel Groenhart
- (Georgia (country)) Davit Kiria
- (Netherlands) Albert Kraus
- (Belarus) Andrei Kulebin
- (China) Wu Xuesong
- (Thailand) Kem Sitsongpeenong
- (Thailand) Sitthichai Sitsongpeenong
- (Netherlands) Andy Souwer
- (Romania) Amansio Paraschiv
- (Netherlands) Warren Stevelmans
- (Russia) Vlad Tuinov
- (France) Dylan Salvador
- (Russia) Anatoly Moiseev
- (Australia) Steve Moxon
- (Morocco) Mohamed Mezouari
- (Germany) Enriko Kehl
- (Belarus) Dzianis Zuev
- (Azerbaijan) Chingiz Allazov
- (Russia) Dzhabar Askerov
- (Thailand) Aikpracha Meenayothin
- (Thailand) Armin Pumpanmuang Windy Sport
- (Turkey) Tayfun Ozcan
- (Suriname) Cedric Manhoef
- (Netherlands) Chris Ngimbi
- (Japan) Yuichiro Nagashima
- (Morocco) Mustapha Haida

==== 75 - 85 kg (165.3 - 187.4 lb) ====
- (Ukraine) Artur Kyshenko
- (Canada) Simon Marcus
- (Russia) Alexander Stetsurenko
- (Belarus) Dmitry Valent
- (Belarus) Vitaly Gurkov
- (Brazil) Alex Pereira
- (Nigeria) Israel Adesanya
- (Azerbaijan) Alim Nabiev
- (Netherlands) Jason Wilnis
- (Morocco) Hicham El Gaoui
- (Myanmar) Too Too
- (China) Bai Jinbin
- (South Africa) Vuyisile Colossa
- (Thailand) Thongchai Sitsongpeenong
- (Belgium) Marc de Bonte
- (Portugal) Diogo Calado

==== 95 kg (209.4 lb) and over ====
- (Belarus) Andrei Gerasimchuk
- (Netherlands) Rico Verhoeven
- (Netherlands) Jahfarr Wilnis
- (Netherlands) Hesdy Gerges
- (Georgia (country)) Tsotne Rogava
- (Brazil) Felipe Micheletti
- (Latvia) Konstantin Gluhov
- (Ukraine) Roman Kryklia
- (Lithuania) Sergej Maslobojev
- (Czech Republic) Tomáš Hron
- (United States) Mighty Mo
- (Suriname) Ashwin Balrak
- (United States) Virgil Zwicker
- (Sudan) Faisal Zakaria
- (South Africa) Francois Botha
- (Romania) Sebastian Ciobanu

==== Women ====
- (Kyrgyzstan) (Peru) Valentina Shevchenko
- (France) Anissa Meksen
- (China) Wang Cong
- (Netherlands) Jemyma Betrian
- (Belarus) Ekaterina Vandaryeva

=== MMA ===
- (China) Zhang Weili
- (China) Zhang Lipeng
- (China) Jumabieke Tuerxun
- (Russia) Muslim Salikhov

== See also ==
- Kunlun Fight World Combat Sports Center
