= Saiyok Pumpanmuang =

Thai welterweight kickboxer and Muay Thai fighter (born 1983)

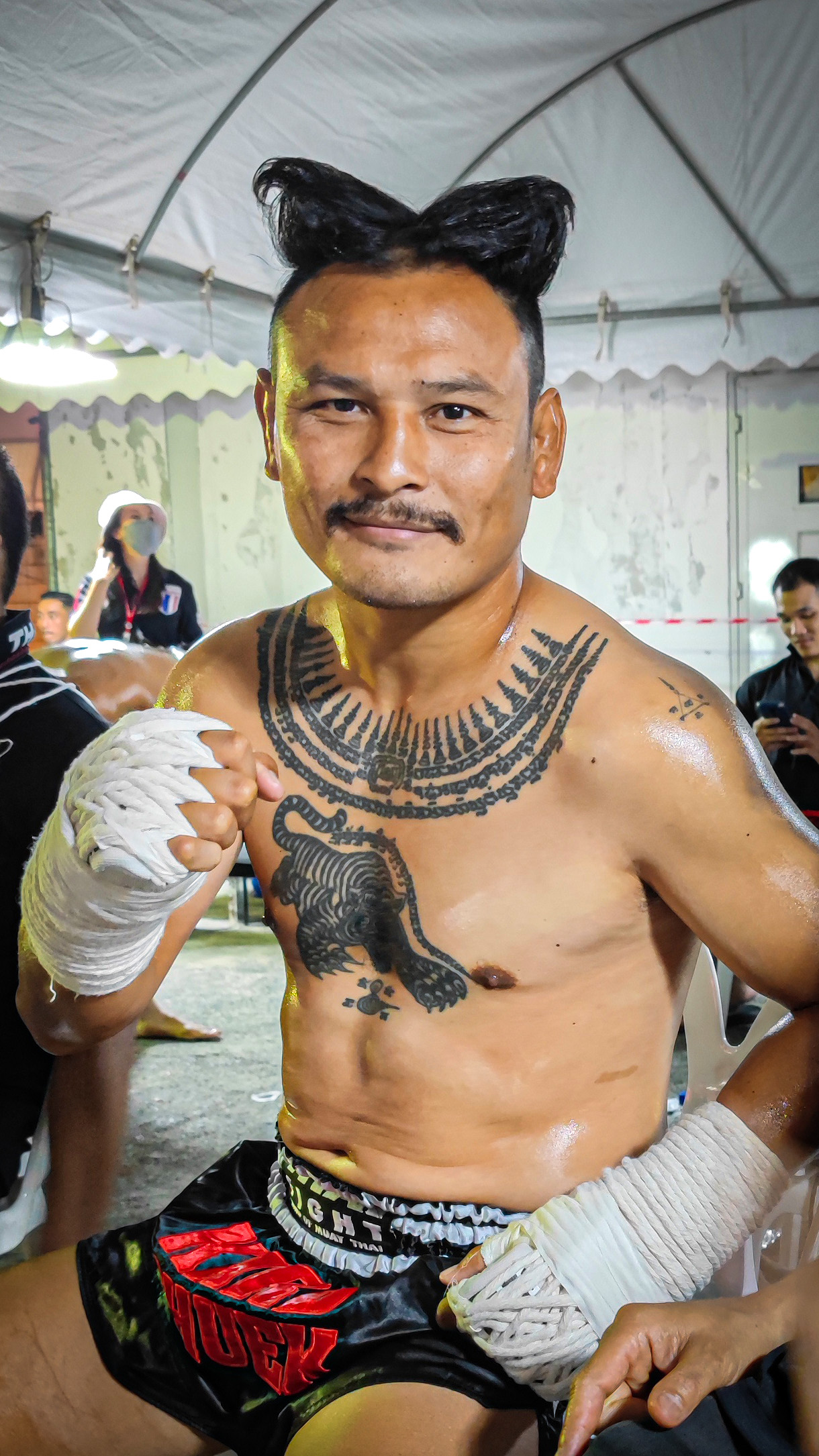
- Saiyok in December 2022
- Born: Sakdaa Niamhom; October 23, 1983 (age 43); Phitsanulok, Thailand
- Native name: ไทรโยค พุ่มพันธ์ม่วง
- Other names: Saiyoknoi Sakchainarong
- Height: 1.72 m (5 ft 7 1/2 in)
- Weight: 72 kg (159 lb; 11 st)
- Division: Lightweight; Welterweight; Middleweight
- Style: Muay Thai
- Stance: Southpaw
- Fighting out of: Bangkok, Thailand
- Team: Muaythai Plaza 2004 (2007–present)
- Trainer: Master Pit and Phomsak
- Years active: 1994–present

Kickboxing record
- Total: 338
- Wins: 284
- By knockout: 93
- Losses: 51
- Draws: 3

Other information
- Notable relatives: Mongkutthong Sakchainarong, brother
- Last updated on: December 25, 2022

Saiyok Pumpanmuang (Thai: ไทรโยค พุ่มพันธ์ม่วง, IPA: [sājjōːk pʰûmpʰānmûːaŋ]; born October 23, 1983), formerly known as Saiyoknoi Sakchainarong (ไทรโยคน้อย ศักดิ์ชัยณรงค์, IPA: [sājjōːknɔ́ːj sàkt͡ɕʰājnārōŋ]), is a Thai welterweight kickboxer and Muay Thai fighter.

He is a former Lumpinee Stadium 154 lbs champion, Thailand 147 lbs champion, WMC 140 lbs champion and Rajadamnern Stadium 140 lbs champion. Saiyok rose to fame during his time with Thai Fight, participating in the inaugural Thai Fight Kard Chuek tournament in 2013 and winning the 2014 Thai Fight 72.5kg Tournament.

== Biography and career ==
Saiyok Pumpanmuang was born as Sakdaa Niamhom on October 22, 1983, in lower northern Thailand in Phitsanulok, the capital of Phitsanulok Province. He began boxing at the age of 11 in the Sor Riendek camp.

== Career ==
=== Muay Thai ===
Known as Saiyoknoi Sakchainarong during early years of his career, he rose to fame by winning three stadium titles including one from the prestigious Rajadamnern Stadium. Saiyok was considered in Thailand one of the most promising fighters in the heavier weight classes, however he fell from grace after losing his belts to Singmanee Sor Srisompong, in a controversial match seen by the thai media as fraud.

After the fight, promoters shied away from the disgraced fighter, forcing him to find another job and earn living as fruit merchant. He was taken in by a promoter at Lumpinee Stadium, Lieutenant General Sukkhatat Pumphanmuang, who decided to help Saiyok on his return to the sport.

Saiyok, took Lumpinee promoter’s last name as part of his new ring alias, and on March 7, 2008, at Lumpinee he won the vacant welterweight title of Thailand by second-round KO over Singsiri Por Sirichai.

On January 9, 2010 at the Society of Journalists annual awards show in Bangkok, Saiyok was awarded the Muaythai Ambassador of the Year award.

He faced Fabio Pinca at THAI FIGHT Extreme 2012: France on September 19, 2012, in Lyon, France, and won via decision after three rounds.

He fought Dylan Salvador in Roschtigrabe, Switzerland, on October 20, 2012, and lost by TKO after he could not continue due to a knee injury at the end of round one.

He outpointed Thiago Texeira at THAI FIGHT Extreme 2013: Muay Thai Day in Ayutthaya, Thailand, on February 23, 2013.

Saiyok was set to fight Chike Lindsay at Muaythai Superfight on May 13, 2013, but the bout was scrapped.

Saiyok will coach a team of farangs against a rival team trained by Sudsakorn Sor Klinmee on the reality television series Thai Fight Kard Chuek, to be shown over between July and August 2013 on Thailand's Channel 3. The two coaches will face off in December 2013.

He knocked out Mickaël Piscitello with a second-round elbow at THAI FIGHT Extreme 2013: Bangkok in Bangkok on June 29, 2013.

He KO'd Muhammad Nsubuga in round two at THAI FIGHT Extreme 2013: Pattani in Pattani, Thailand on September 22, 2013.

He beat Seyedisa Alamdarnezam by an extension round decision in a non-tournament match at the Thai Fight Semi-Finals in Bangkok, Thailand on November 30, 2013.

On December 22, 2013, he faced Sudsakorn Sor Klinmee at the 2013 Thai Fight Final for the inaugural Thai Fight 70 kg Kard Chuek Championship. He lost the fight by extension fourth-round decision.

Saiyok competed in his second Thai Fight tournament when he was entered into the Thai Fight 72.5 kg Championship. He defeated Alka Matewa in the semi-finals on November 22, 2014. On December 21, 2014, he defeated French phenom Antoine Pinto to become the inaugural Thai Fight 72.5 kg King's Cup Tournament Champion.

=== Lethwei ===
On July 22, 2018, Saiyok faced Lethwei star Tun Tun Min, former Openweight Lethwei World Champion, under traditional Lethwei rules KO to win in Yangon, Myanmar. Both fighters showed immense heart, but left fans slightly disappointed since it ended in a draw because there was no knockout.

== Titles and accomplishments ==
=== Kickboxing ===
- Kunlun Fight
  - 2019 Kunlun Fight 75 kg Tournament Runner-Up
- Space One
  - Space One Champions 2024 78 kg.

=== Muay Thai ===
- World Muay Thai Organization (WMO)
  - 2015 WMO Muaythai 72 kg World Champion
- Thai Fight
  - 2022 Thai Fight 72.5 kg Kard Chuek Runner-Up
  - 2017 Thai Fight 72.5 kg Tournament Runner-Up
  - 2014 Thai Fight 72.5 kg Tournament Champion
  - 2013 Thai Fight 70 kg Kard Chuek Tournament Runner-Up
  - 39–5 record
- Martial Arts Sports Association (MASA)
  - 2012 MASA Junior Middleweight World Muay Thai Champion
- World Muaythai Council (WMC)
  - 2012 WMC 4-Man Tournament Champion
  - 2006 WMC Super-lightweight Champion (140 lb)
- Lumpinee Stadium
  - 2010 Lumpinee Stadium Super-welterweight (154 lb) Champion
- Professional Boxing Association of Thailand (PAT)
  - 2008 Thailand Welterweight (147 lb) Champion
- Rajadamnern Stadium
  - 2007 Rajadamnern Stadium Super-lightweight Champion (140 lb)
- Omnoi Stadium
  - 2007 Tamjai Superyak 8-Man Tournament Champion (143 lb)

=== Boxing ===
- World Boxing Council (WBC)
  - 2014 WBC Asia Silver Welterweight Champion

=== Awards ===
- 2010 Muaythai Ambassador of the Year
- Member of Thai Fight from 2011 to 2018 (31–5 record)

== Fight record ==
Muay Thai record
284 Wins (93 (T)KOs), 54 Losses, 3 Draw
| Date | Result | Opponent | Event | Location | Method | Round | Time |
| 2025-10-06 | | (China) Law Cho Sing | Battle of the Century III | Guangzhou, China | | | |
| 2025-02-23 | Loss | (Cambodia) Lao Chantrea | Krud Kun Khmer | Cambodia | Decision | 3 | 3:00 |
| 2024-11-16 | Loss | (China) Han Haojie | Space ONE Champions | Foshan, China | Decision | 3 | 3:00 |
| 2024-07-27 | Loss | (China) Han Wenbao | Wu Lin Feng 546 | China | Decision | 3 | 3:00 |
| 2024-06-16 | Loss | (Cambodia) Thun Rithy | TVK: The Battle of King II | Banteay Meanchey province, Cambodia | Decision (Unanimous) | 3 | 3:00 |
| 2024-05-07 | Win | (Hong Kong) Jackson Law | Space One Champions 2024 | Kowloon, Hong Kong | Decision | 3 | 3:00 |
| 2024-04-20 | Win | (Uzbekistan) Ortikov Shokhruz | Kunlun Fight 98 | Chonburi, Thailand | Decision | 3 | 3:00 |
| 2024-02-23 | Loss | (Morocco) Mohamed Atlas | Muay Lao Fight 2024: Champasak | Pakse, Laos | Decision | 3 | 3:00 |
| 2024-02-04 | Draw | (Cambodia) Thun Rithy | TVK: The Battle of Kings | Phnom Penh, Cambodia | Draw | 3 | 3:00 |
| 2023-11-26 | Win | (Algeria) Akram Tamimount | Thai Fight: Bang Kachao | Samut Prakan province, Thailand | KO | 2 | |
| 2023-10-29 | Win | (Germany) Kristian Malocaj | THAI FIGHT Setthi Ruea Thong | Lopburi, Thailand | Decision | 3 | 3:00 |
| 2023-06-18 | Win | (Wales) Luke Bar | THAI FIGHT Luk Luang Phor Sothorn | Chachoengsao, Thailand | TKO | 1 | |
| 2023-05-21 | Win | (Iran) Alireza Amirzadeh | THAI FIGHT 100 Years Rajabhat Korat | Nakhon Ratchasima, Thailand | Decision | 3 | 3:00 |
| 2023-04-22 | Win | (Senegal) Abdoulaye Diallo | THAI FIGHT Rome | Rome, Italy | Decision | 3 | 3:00 |
| 2023-02-26 | Win | (Algeria) Walid Otmane | THAI FIGHT Kon Rak Pathum | Pathum Thani province, Thailand | Decision | 3 | 3:00 |
| 2023-02-04 | Win | (Spain) Kevin Bosah | THAI FIGHT Luang Phor Ruay | Saraburi province, Thailand | KO | 2 | |
| 2022-12-24 | Loss | (Cambodia) Thoeun Theara | Thai Fight: Metropolitan Police Bureau 100th Anniversary | Bangkok, Thailand | TKO (Doctor stoppage) | 1 | 1:43 |
| 2022-11-20 | Win | (France) Samuel Andoche | THAI FIGHT Vana Nava Hua Hin | Hua Hin district, Thailand | Decision | 3 | 3:00 |
| 2022-10-16 | Win | (Cambodia) Thun Rithy Kun Khmer | THAI FIGHT Vajiravudh | Bangkok, Thailand | KO (Body kicks) | 2 | |
| 2022-05-29 | Win | (Uzbekistan) Uzair Ismoiljonov | THAI FIGHT Nakhon Sawan | Nakhon Sawan, Thailand | TKO (3 Knockdown) | 1 | |
| 2022-05-08 | Win | (England) Jordan Watson | THAI FIGHT Sung Noen | Sung Noen district, Thailand | Decision | 3 | 3:00 |
| 2022-04-17 | Win | (Iran) Keivan Soleimani | THAI FIGHT KonlakPathum | Pathum Thani, Thailand | Ext R. Decision | 4 | 3:00 |
| 2022-03-20 | Win | (Brazil) Luiz Alves | THAI FIGHT Lampang | Lampang, Thailand | Decision | 3 | 3:00 |
| 2021-12-19 | Win | (Thailand) Fahsai Changmuaythaigym | THAI FIGHT Khao Aor | Phatthalung, Thailand | KO | 2 | |
| 2021-07-04 | Win | (Estonia) Jargo Aniste | THAI FIGHT Strong | Pattaya, Thailand | TKO (Referee stoppage/High kick) | 2 | |
| 2021-04-25 | Win | (Switzerland) Gligor Stojanov | THAI FIGHT DMHTT | Samut Sakhon, Thailand | KO | 2 | |
| 2021-04-03 | Win | (Poland) Piotr Lagodzki | THAI FIGHT Nan | Nan, Thailand | KO | 1 | |
| 2020-11-28 | Win | (Portugal) Fabio Reis | THAI FIGHT Pluak Daeng | Rayong, Thailand | Decision | 3 | 3:00 |
| 2020-11-07 | Win | (Romania) Alexandru Bublea | THAI FIGHT Korat 2020 | Nakhon Ratchasima, Thailand | Decision | 3 | 3:00 |
| 2020-10-17 | Win | (India) Atin Gaur | THAI FIGHT Begins | Nonthaburi, Thailand | TKO | 1 | |
| 2019-07-27 | Loss | (Belarus) Vitaly Gurkov | Kunlun Fight 81 75 kg World Tournament (Finals ) | Beijing, China | Decision (Unanimous) | 3 | 3:00 |
Fight was for the Kunlun Fight 75kg Tournament .
| 2019-07-27 | Win | (China) Jiao Fukai | Kunlun Fight 81 75 kg World Tournament (1/2 Finals ) | Beijing, China | Decision (Majority) | 3 | 3:00 |
| 2019-07-27 | Win | (China) Liu Xu | Kunlun Fight 81 75 kg World Tournament (1/4 Finals ) | Beijing, China | Decision | 3 | 3:00 |
| 2019-01-12 | Loss | (China) Han Feilong | Emei Legend 36 | China | Decision | 3 | 3:00 |
| 2018-06-02 | Win | (China) Yi Long | Wu Lin Feng 2018: Yi Long VS Saiyok | China | KO | 1 | 2:30 |
| 2018-04-21 | Win | (Italy) Saro Presti | THAI FIGHT Rome | Rome, Italy | Decision (Unanimous) | 3 | 3:00 |
| 2018-01-27 | Loss | (Thailand) Chanajon P.K. Saenchai Muaythaigym | THAI FIGHT Bangkok | Bangkok, Thailand | KO | 2 | |
| 2017-12-23 | Win | (Italy) Martin Meoni | THAI FIGHT Chiang Mai | Chiang Mai, Thailand | Decision | 3 | 3:00 |
| 2017-09-30 | Loss | (Morocco) Youssef El Hadmi | THAI FIGHT Barcelona | Barcelona, Spain | Decision | 3 | 3:00 |
| 2017-07-15 | Win | (Myanmar) Kyal Lin Aung | THAI FIGHT We Love Yala | Yala, Thailand | TKO | 3 | |
| 2017-05-27 | Win | (Italy) Julian Imeri | THAI FIGHT Italy | Turin, Italy | Decision | 3 | |
| 2017-04-29 | Win | (Australia) Nick Price | THAI FIGHT Samui 2017 | Ko Samui, Thailand | KO | 2 | |
| 2017-04-08 | Loss | (France) Raphaël Llodra | THAI FIGHT Paris | Paris, France | Decision | 3 | 3:00 |
| 2017-04-01 | Loss | (Belarus) Chingiz Allazov | Wu Lin Feng 2017: China VS Europe | Zhengzhou, China | Decision (Unanimous) | 3 | 3:00 |
| 2017-01-14 | Loss | (China) Sun Weiqiang | Wu Lin Feng World Championship 2017 | Zhengzhou, China | Decision | 3 | 3:00 |
| 2016-12-24 | Loss | (Belgium) Youssef Boughanem | THAI FIGHT The Fighter King | Thailand | Decision (Unanimous) | 3 | 3:00 |
| 2016-11-19 | Win | (Poland) Lapawa Jedrzej | THAI FIGHT AIR RACE 1 | Thailand | Decision (Unanimous) | 3 | 3:00 |
| 2016-09-11 | Loss | (United Kingdom) Ben Hodge | THAI FIGHT London | London, United Kingdom | Decision | 3 | 3:00 |
| 2016-08-06 | Loss | (China) Zhang Kaiyin | Glory of Heroes 4 | Changzhi, China | Decision | 3 | 3:00 |
| 2016-07-23 | Win | (Cambodia) Phan Khorun | THAI FIGHT Proud to Be Thai | Thailand | KO | 1 | 3:00 |
| 2016-06-25 | Win | (Belarus) Dzmitry Filipau | Kunlun Fight 46 | Kunming, China | Decision (Unanimous) | 3 | 3:00 |
| 2016-04-30 | Win | (Morocco) Imad Assli | THAI FIGHT Samui 2016 | Ko Samui, Thailand | Decision (Unanimous) | 3 | 3:00 |
| 2016-04-09 | Loss | (Suriname) Serginio Kanters | Kunlun Fight 40 - 70 kg World Max 2016 Group H Tournament Semi Finals]] | Xining, China | Ext R. Decision | 4 | 3:00 |
| 2016-03-19 | Win | (Brazil) Reinaldo Oliveira | THAI FIGHT Korat | Korat, Thailand | KO | 1 | 3:00 |
| 2016-03-12 | Win | (Canada) Matthew Richardson | THAI FIGHT | Bangkok, Thailand | Decision (Unanimous) | 3 | 3:00 |
| 2015-12-31 | Win | (New Zealand) Daniel Kerr | THAI FIGHT Count Down | Bangkok, Thailand | Decision | 3 | 3:00 |
| 2015-11-21 | Win | (Turkey) Omar Yilmaz | THAI FIGHT RPCA | Nakhon Pathom, Thailand | KO | 1 | 3:00 |
| 2015-10-24 | Win | (Canada) Alain Sylvestre | THAI FIGHT Vietnam | Ho Chi Minh City, Vietnam | KO | 1 | 3:00 |
| 2015-10-03 | Win | (China) Hu Yafei | Wu Lin Feng World Championship 2015 | China | Ext R. Decision | 4 | 3:00 |
| 2015-09-17 | Win | (Russia) Roman Babaev | THAI FIGHT Moscow | Moscow, Russia | Decision | 3 | 3:00 |
| 2015-08-22 | Win | (France) Yassin El Hana | THAI FIGHT Narathiwat | Narathiwat, Thailand | Decision | 3 | 3:00 |
| 2015-07-18 | Win | (Sweden) Carl N'Diaye | THAI FIGHT Shaolin | Zhengzhou, China | TKO | 3 | 3:00 |
| 2015-05-02 | Win | (Russia) Yurik Davtyan | THAI FIGHT Samui 2015 | Ko Samui, Thailand | KO | 2 | |
| 2015-04-04 | Win | (France) Remy Vectol | THAI FIGHT CRMA | Nakhon Nayok, Thailand | Decision | 3 | 3:00 |
| 2015-02-28 | Win | (Portugal) Diogo Calado | Ring War 2015 | Sesto San Giovanni, Italy | TKO | 2 | |
For the World Muay Thai Organization (WMO) Muay Thai -72.5 kg. World title.
| 2014-12-21 | Win | (France) Antuan Siangboxing | THAI FIGHT Final - 72.5 kg Tournament | Bangkok, Thailand | Decision | 3 | 3:00 |
Won Thai Fight 72.5 kg Tournament
| 2014-11-22 | Win | (Belgium) Alka Matewa | THAI FIGHT - 72.5 kg Tournament Semi-Finals | Thailand | KO | 1 | |
| 2014-06-28 | Win | (Belgium) Alka Matewa | THAI FIGHT WORLD BATTLE 2014: Macau | Macau, China | Decision | 3 | |
| 2014-04-06 | Win | (Thailand) Chanajon P.K. Saenchai Muaythaigym | THAI FIGHT WORLD BATTLE 2014: Chakrinaruebet | Sattahip, Thailand | KO (left elbow) | 3 | |
| 2013-12-22 | Loss | (Thailand) Sudsakorn Sor Klinmee | THAI FIGHT Kard Chuek - Final | Bangkok, Thailand | Ext R. Decision | 4 | |
| 2013-11-30 | Win | (Iran) Seyedisa Alamdarnezam | THAI FIGHT Kard Chuek - Semi-Finals | Bangkok, Thailand | Ext R. Decision | 4 | |
| 2013-09-22 | Win | (Uganda) Muhammad Nsubuga | THAI FIGHT EXTREME 2013: Pattani | Pattani, Thailand | KO | 2 | |
| 2013-07-29 | Win | (Belgium) Youssef Boughanem | THAI FIGHT Kard Chuek, Quarter-Finals | Bangkok, Thailand | Decision | 3 | 3:00 |
| 2013-06-29 | Win | (France) Mickaël Piscitello | THAI FIGHT EXTREME 2013: Bangkok | Bangkok, Thailand | KO (left elbow) | 2 | |
| 2013-02-23 | Win | (Brazil) Thiago Texeira | THAI FIGHT EXTREME 2013: Muay Thai Day | Ayutthaya, Thailand | Decision (unanimous) | 3 | 3:00 |
| 2012-11-24 | Win | (France) Wilfried Montagne | Frank Lee's Muay Thai Mayhem 3 | Edmonton, Alberta, Canada | Decision | 5 | 3:00 |
| 2012-10-20 | Loss | (France) Dylan Salvador | Roschtigrabe Derby | Roschtigrabe, Switzerland | TKO (knee injury) | 1 | 3:00 |
| 2012-09-19 | Win | (France) Fabio Pinca | THAI FIGHT Lyon | Lyon, France | Decision | 3 | 3:00 |
| 2012-08-17 | Win | (Scotland) Craig Jose | THAI FIGHT EXTREME 2012: England | Leicester, England | Decision | 3 | 3:00 |
| 2012-06-23 | Win | (Australia) Michael Demetriou | Conquest II | Orange, New South Wales | Decision (Unanimous) | 5 | 3:00 |
Wins MASA Junior Middleweight World Muaythai title.
| 2012-05-27 | Loss | (Morocco) Mohamed Khamal | SLAMM: Nederland vs. Thailand VII | Almere, Netherlands | TKO (Doctor stop/cut by elbow) | 2 | |
| 2012-04-03 | Win | (England) Jordan Watson | WMC Tournament, Final | Bangkok, Thailand | Decision | 5 | 3:00 |
Wins WMC 4 Men Tournament title.
| 2012-04-03 | Win | (South Africa) Vuyisile Colossa | WMC Tournament, Semi Final | Bangkok, Thailand | Decision | 3 | 3:00 |
| 2012-03-10 | Win | (France) Sofian Seboussi | RMB : France vs Thailand 2012 | Ile-Saint-Denis, France | Decision | 5 | 3:00 |
| 2011-12-18 | Win | (France) Hicham Chaibi | THAI FIGHT 2011 | Bangkok, Thailand | Decision | 3 | 3:00 |
| 2011-10-08 | Win | (Italy) Mauro Serra | Muay Thai Premier League 2nd Round | Padua, Italy | Decision | 3 | 3:00 |
| 2011-08-07 | Win | (Japan) Kou Suman | THAI FIGHT EXTREME 2011: Japan | Tokyo, Japan | Decision | 3 | 3:00 |
| 2011-07-23 | Win | (Australia) Bruce Macfie | Thailand Versus Challenger Series 2011 | Bangkok, Thailand | Decision (Unanimous) | 5 | 3:00 |
| 2011-05-31 | Win | (Belarus) Andrei Kulebin | Fight Factory Arena 2011 | Hong Kong | TKO | 1 | 1:38 |
| 2011-05-14 | Win | (Spain) Ibrahima Njie Jarra | THAI FIGHT EXTREME 2011: France | Cannes, France | TKO | 1 | |
| 2011-04-10 | Win | (Laos) Fahsuriya Sor Por Por Lao | Muay Khat-Chuak in Inter-Mekhon | Cambodia | KO | 3 | |
| 2011-03-19 | Win | (Thailand) Laemthong Thor Ponchai | Sinbi-Muay Thai | Phuket, Thailand | Decision | 5 | |
| 2010-12-05 | Win | (France) Cédric Muller | Thailand King's Birthday | Bangkok, Thailand | TKO | 4 | |
| 2010-10-29 | Win | (France) Abdallah Mabel | France vs Lumpinee | Paris, France | Decision | 5 | 3:00 |
Defends the Lumpinee Stadium Super-welterweight (154 lb) title.
| 2010-08-12 | Win | (France) Antuan Siangboxing | Thailand vs Challenger Onesongchai Series, Sanam Luang | Bangkok, Thailand | Decision (Unanimous) | 5 | 3:00 |
| 2010-08-06 | Win | (South Africa) Bakhulule Baai | | Phuket, Thailand | KO | 3 | |
| 2010-07-29 | Win | (France) Sekou Dembele | Thepprasit Fairtex Stadium | Pattaya, Thailand | Decision (Unanimous) | 5 | 3:00 |
| 2010-04-10 | Win | (Belgium) Edgar N'Zunga | Star Muaythai V | Maastricht, Netherlands | KO | 4 | |
| 2010-02-26 | Win | (France) Farid Villaume | Lumpinee Stadium | Bangkok, Thailand | Decision (Unanimous) | 5 | 3:00 |
Wins the inaugural Lumpinee Stadium Super-welterweight (154 lb) title.
| 2009-11-29 | Win | (South Africa) Warren Stevelmans | SLAMM "Nederland vs Thailand VI" | Almere, Netherlands | Decision (Unanimous) | 5 | 3:00 |
| 2009-11-07 | Win | (Armenia) Armen Petrosyan | Janus FightNight: Thai Boxe Last Challenge | Padua, Italy | Decision (Unanimous) | 5 | 3:00 |
| 2009-10-17 | Win | (South Africa) Bakhulule Baai | Muay Thai Mayhem : In the Beginning | Edmonton, Canada | TKO | 5 | 0:31 |
| 2009-09-26 | Win | (Thailand) Samranchai 96 Penang | Battle of Sweden II | Stockholm, Sweden | Decision (Unanimous) | 5 | 3:00 |
| 2009-08-08 | Win | (Russia) Dmitry Ushkanov | Libogen Fight Night X: Chariots of Fire | Hong Kong | KO | | |
| 2009-05-30 | Win | (Netherlands) Harry Loodewijks | Star Muaythai IV | Maastricht, Netherlands | KO | 3 | 2:28 |
| 2009-05-09 | Win | (Slovakia) Rudolf Durica | C-4 Thaiboxing part 4 | Kristianstad, Sweden | Decision (Unanimous) | 5 | 3:00 |
| 2009-04-05 | Win | (Republic of Ireland) Seamus Cogan | Chitalada Showdown II | Tampere, Finland | KO | 2 | |
| 2009-02-21 | Win | (Australia) Bruce Macfie | Libogen Fight Night IX | Hong Kong | KO | 2 | |
| 2009-01-02 | Win | (Thailand) Samranchai 96 Penang | Lumpinee Stadium | Bangkok, Thailand | Decision (Unanimous) | 5 | 3:00 |
| 2008-11-29 | Win | (Morocco) Fikri Tijarti | SLAMM "Nederland vs Thailand V" | Almere, Netherlands | Decision (Unanimous) | 5 | 3:00 |
| 2008-09-17 | Win | (France) Hicham Hachem | Libogen Fight Night VIII | Hong Kong | KO | 2 | |
| 2008-08-21 | Win | (South Korea) K.Max | Libogen Fight Night VII | Hong Kong | Decision (Unanimous) | 3 | 3:00 |
| 2008-08-03 | Win | (Japan) Daisuke LuukHamakko | Muay Thai Wave from Yokohama7 | Yokohama, Japan | TKO 1R2 | 1 | 2:00 |
| 2008-06-08 | Win | (Australia) Ben Burton | Libogen Fight Night VI | Hong Kong | TKO | 1 | |
| 2008-03-07 | Win | (Thailand) Singsiri Por Sirichai | Suk Pumphanmuang, Lumpinee Stadium | Bangkok, Thailand | KO (Left elbow) | 2 | |
Wins vacant Champion of Thailand Welterweight (147 lb) title.
| 2007-10-27 | Loss | (Thailand) Singmanee Sor Srisompong | Rajadamnern Stadium | Bangkok, Thailand | Decision | 5 | 3:00 |
Loses Rajadamnern Stadium and WMC Super Lightweight (140 lb) titles.
| 2007-04-30 | Loss | (Thailand) Bigben Jor Rachadakon | Rajadamnern Stadium | Bangkok, Thailand | Decision | 5 | 3:00 |
| 2007-03-24 | Win | (Thailand) Berneung Topkingboxing | Rajadamnern Stadium | Bangkok, Thailand | TKO | 5 | |
Retains his Rajadamnern and WMC Super-lightweight (140 lb) titles.
| 2007-03-15 | Win | (Thailand) Berneung Topkingboxing | Daowrungchujarern, Rajadamnern Stadium | Bangkok, Thailand | Decision | 5 | 3:00 |
| 2006-12-21 | Loss | (Thailand) Jaroenchai Kesagym | Chujaroen + Jarumueang, Rajadamnern Stadium | Bangkok, Thailand | Decision | 5 | 3:00 |
| 2006-10-08 | Win | (Thailand) Lertmongkol Sor.Tharathip | Chujaroen, Rajadamnern Stadium | Bangkok, Thailand | Decision | 5 | 3:00 |
Defends WMC Super-lightweight (140 lb) title.
| 2006-08-17 | Win | (Thailand) Berneung Topkingboxing | Daorungchujaroen, Rajadamnern Stadium | Bangkok, Thailand | TKO (Low kicks) | 4 | |
Wins WMC Super-lightweight (140 lb) title.
| 2006-02-18 | Win | (Thailand) Kiatthaksin Sor Damrong | Thamjai promotion, Omnoi Stadium | Bangkok, Thailand | TKO | 2 | |
| 2005-12-16 | Win | (Thailand) Tawatchai Sitkriangkri | Siangmorakot Fights, Rajadamnern Stadium | Bangkok, Thailand | Decision | 5 | 3:00 |
| 2004- | Loss | (Thailand) Lakhin Wassandasit | Omnoi Stadium, Tam Jai Tournament Final | Bangkok, Thailand | KO (Punches) | 2 | |
For the Omnoi Stadium 140 lbs title.
Legend: Win Loss Draw/No contest Notes

== Lethwei record ==
Professional Lethwei record
0 wins (0 (T)KOs), 0 losses, 1 draws
| Date | Result | Opponent | Event | Location | Method | Round | Time |
| 2018-07-22 | Draw | (Myanmar) Tun Tun Min | 2018 Golden Belt Championship | Yangon, Myanmar | Draw | 5 | 3:00 |
Legend: Win Loss Draw/No contest Notes

== Boxing record ==
Boxing record
2 Wins (2 (T)KO's)
| Date | Result | Opponent | Event | Location | Method | Round | Time | Record |
| 2014-03-14 | Win | (China) You-Jie Zeng | Wat Khaolangpattana | Lop Buri, Thailand | RTD | 5 | | 2–0 |
Wins WBC Asia Silver Welterweight title (147 lbs).
| 2013-04-09 | Win | (South Africa) Muhammad Sapata | Chiranakorn Stadium | Songkhla, Thailand | KO | 2 | | 1–0 |
Legend: Win Loss Draw/No contest Notes

== See also ==
- List of male kickboxers
