= Alexey Kudin =

Belarusian kickboxer and mixed martial arts (MMA) fighter

Alexei Kudin
- Born: December 20, 1984 (age 41); Minsk, Byelorussian SSR, Soviet Union
- Native name: Аляксей Кудзін
- Other names: Brick
- Nationality: Belarusian
- Height: 6 ft 1 in (185 cm)
- Weight: 237 lb (108 kg; 16 st 13 lb)
- Division: Heavyweight
- Style: Kickboxing; Muay Thai; MMA
- Stance: Orthodox
- Fighting out of: Minsk Belarus
- Team: Red Fury Fight Team
- Years active: 2007–2019

Kickboxing record
- Total: 27
- Wins: 18
- By knockout: 12
- Losses: 7
- By knockout: 1
- Draws: 2

Mixed martial arts record
- Total: 40
- Wins: 26
- By knockout: 20
- By submission: 1
- By decision: 5
- Losses: 12
- By knockout: 2
- By submission: 3
- By decision: 6
- Unknown: 1
- Draws: 1
- No contests: 1

Other information
- Mixed martial arts record from Sherdog

Alexei Kudin (Belarusian: Аляксей Кудзін; born December 20, 1984) is a Belarusian former professional kickboxer and mixed martial artist. He is a world champion and European versions WBKF, King of Kings – Grand Prix K-1 tournament finalist, which was held December 16, 2010, in Odintsovo. In addition to competition in kickboxing, Alexei Kudin had many professional fights in mixed martial arts.

== Career ==
Kudin faced Chaban Ka on April 9, 2013, in a quarter finals match of the 2013 M-1 Grand Prix and lost the fight in first round by rear-naked choke.

== Titles ==
=== Kickboxing ===
Professional

- King of Kings
  - 2010 KOK World GP 2010 in Moscow runner up
- World Bars Kickboxing Federation
  - 2008 WBKF European Super Heavyweight tournament runner up (+93 kg)
  - 2008 WBKF World Super Heavyweight tournament runner up (+93 kg)
  - 2007 WBKF World Super Heavyweight champion (+93 kg)

Amateur

- 2013 WAKO world championship (silver) +91 kg (K-1 rules)
- 2010 WAKO European championship (gold) +91 kg (K-1 rules)
- 2009 WAKO world championship (gold) +91 kg
- 2008 WAKO European championship (gold) +91 kg (K-1 rules)
- 2007 WAKO world championship (gold) +91 kg
- 2006 WAKO European championship (gold) +91 kg (Thai-Boxing rules)
- 2004 WAKO European championship (silver) -91 kg (K-1 rules)

=== Muaythai ===
Amateur

- 2012 IFMA European championship (silver) +91 kg
- 2011 IFMA world championship (gold) +91 kg
- 2010 IFMA world championship (bronze) +91 kg
- 2008 IFMA world championship (gold) +91 kg
- 2007 IFMA world championship (gold) +91 kg
- 2006 IFMA world championship (bronze) +91 kg
- 2006 WMF world championship (gold) +91 kg

=== MMA ===
- Russian MMA Union
  - 2012 Russian MMA Championship tournament champion (+93 kg)
- Professional Fighting Championships (ProFC)
  - 2011 ProFC Grand Prix champion (+93 kg)

== Mixed martial arts record ==
Professional record breakdown
41 matches	26 wins	13 losses
By knockout	20	2
By submission	1	3
By decision	5	7
Unknown	0	1
Draws	1	
No contests	1	

Res.	Record	Opponent	Method	Event	Date	Round	Time	Location	Notes
Loss	26–13–1 (1)	Omar Aliev	Decision (unanimous)	BetCity Fight Nights: Cup of Petr Mineev	June 20, 2025	3	5:00	Ulyanovsk, Russia	
Win	26–12–1 (1)	Evgeniy Bova	TKO (punches)	New Fighting Generation 13	September 27, 2019	1	2:35	Minsk, Belarus	
Win	25–12–1 (1)	Dmitriy Isachenko	Submission (choke)	Eastern Economic Forum: Roscongress Vladivostok Combat Night	September 5, 2019	1	N/A	Vladivostok, Russia	
Loss	24–12–1 (1)	Anatoly Malykhin	TKO (punches)	Fight Nights Global 93	April 25, 2019	2	3:32	Moscow, Russia	
NC	24–11–1 (1)	Chaban Ka	NC (illegal strike)	100% Fight 38	March 9, 2019	1	N/A	Paris, France	For the vacant 100% Fight Heavyweight Championship. Accidental illegal strike rendered Ka unable to continue.
Win	24–11–1	Cody East	TKO (retirement)	Fight Nights Global: Summer Cup 2018	June 30, 2018	5	N/A	Bozhou, China	
Loss	23–11–1	Viktor Pešta	Submission (rear-naked choke)	Fight Nights Global 79	November 19, 2017	1	4:52	Penza, Russia	
Win	23–10–1	Charles Andrade	Decision (unanimous)	Academy MMA Cup 2017	October 20, 2017	3	5:00	Minsk, Belarus	
Win	22–10–1	Derrick Mehmen	Decision (split)	Fight Nights Global 64	April 28, 2017	3	5:00	Moscow, Russia	
Loss	21–10–1	Sergei Pavlovich	Decision (unanimous)	Fight Nights Global 54	November 16, 2016	3	5:00	Rostov-on-Don, Russia	FNG Heavyweight Grand Prix Semifinal.
Draw	21–9-1	Mikhail Mokhnatkin	Draw	Fight Nights Global 46	April 29, 2016	3	5:00	Krylatskoe, Russia	
Win	21–9	Evgeni Boldyrev	KO (punches)	Mix Fight Combat	December 25, 2015	1	4:51	Khimki, Russia	
Loss	20–9	Jeremy May	Submission (armbar)	M-1 Global – Way to M-1 China	July 25, 2015	1		Chengdu, China	
Win	20–8	Baga Agaev	TKO (leg kicks)	M-1 Challenge 58 – Battle in the Mountains 4	June 6, 2015	2	1:40	Ingushetia, Russia	
Loss	19–8	Alexander Volkov	Decision (unanimous)	Union MMA Pro	February 21, 2015	3	5:00	Krasnodar, Russia	
Win	19–7	Travis Fulton	TKO (punches)	Russian MMA Union – New Horizons Grand Final	November 22, 2014	1	1:34	Minsk, Belarus	
Win	18–7	Andreas Kraniotakes	KO (punch)	ProFC 55: Kudin vs. Kraniotakes	October 19, 2014	1	4:23	Krasnodar, Russia	
Loss	17–7	Sergei Kharitonov	TKO (punches)	M-1 Challenge 43	November 15, 2013	2	4:52	Surgut, Russia	
Win	17–6	Vladimir Mishchenko	TKO (retirement)	OC – Oplot Challenge 67	June 20, 2013	1	5:00	Kharkov, Ukraine	
Win	16–6	Vladimir Nepochatov	KO (punch)	NC – Neman Challenge	June 1, 2013	1	0:23	Grodno, Belarus	
Win	15–6	Dritan Bajramaj	KO (punch)	M-1 Challenge 39	May 23, 2013	1	1:17	Moscow, Russia	
Loss	14–6	Chaban Ka	Submission (rear-naked choke)	M-1 Challenge 38: Spring Battle	April 10, 2013	1	4:06	St. Petersburg, Russia	M-1 Grand Prix: Quarter Finals
Loss	14–5	Mike Wessel	Decision (unanimous)	Bellator 83	December 7, 2012	3	5:00	Atlantic City, New Jersey, United States	
Win	14–4	Konstantin Gluhov	Decision (unanimous)	RMMAC – Russian MMA Championship	June 1, 2012	2	5:00	St.Petersburg, Russia	Wins Russian MMA Championship tournament.
Win	13–4	Tadas Rimkevicius	TKO (doctor stoppage)	RMMAC – Russian MMA Championship	June 1, 2012	1		St.Petersburg, Russia	Semi finals.
Win	12–4	Oleg Tinins	TKO (punches)	RMMAC – Russian MMA Championship	June 1, 2012	1		St.Petersburg, Russia	Quarter finals.
Win	11–4	Evgeniy Denschikov	KO (punch)	V – Vosmiugolnik	March 31, 2012	1		Minsk, Belarus	
Win	10–4	Vladimir Kuchenko	TKO (leg kicks)	Lion's Fights 1 – The Beginning	March 3, 2012	1	2:32	St.Petersburg, Russia	
Loss	9–4	Magomed Abdurahimov	Decision (split)	WUFC – Challenge of Champions	December 24, 2011	3	5:00	Makhachkala, Russia	Final.
Win	9–3	Konstantin Gluhov	Decision (unanimous)	WUFC – Challenge of Champions	December 24, 2011	2	5:00	Makhachkala, Russia	Semi finals.
Win	8–3	Kazbek Saidaliev	KO (punch)	ProFC – Grand Prix Global Finals	December 10, 2011	1	2:22	Rostov-on-Don, Russia	
Win	7–3	Dmitry Poberezhets	TKO (punches)	ProFC – Grand Prix Global Finals	December 10, 2011	3	3:39	Rostov-on-Don, Russia	
Win	6–3	Semion Borsh	TKO (punches)	ProFC Grand Prix Global – East Europe	August 26, 2011	1	0:48	Kishinev, Moldova	Wins ProFC Grand Prix.
Win	5–3	Wojciech Bulinski	KO (punch)	ProFC Grand Prix Global – East Europe	August 26, 2011	1	0:07	Kishinev, Moldova	Semi finals.
Win	4–3	Dmitry Poberezhets	Decision (unanimous)	ProFC – Union Nation Cup Final	July 2, 2011	2	5:00	Rostov-on-Don, Russia	
Win	3–3	Vitaly Operit	TKO (punches)	RF – Real Fight-FC	March 25, 2011	1	2:00	Minsk, Belarus	
Win	2–3	Denis Ivanets	Submission (punches)	M-1 Challenge: Belarus	March 20, 2010	1	1:58	Brest, Belarus	
Loss	1–3	Vidmantas Tatarunas	Decision (unanimous)	Shooto Lithuania – King of Bushido Stage 2	December 13, 2003	2	5:00	Kaunas, Lithuania	
Loss	1–2	Nikolai Onikienko	Decision (unanimous)	WAFC – CIS Cup 2003	December 21, 2002			Yaroslavl, Russia	
Loss	1–1	Telman Piraev	N/A	IAFC – Vasily Kudin Memorial 2002	May 4, 2002			Kadiivka, Ukraine	
Win	1–0	Dmitry Surnev	TKO (cut)	IAFC – Vasily Kudin Memorial 2002	May 4, 2002			Kadiivka, Ukraine	MMA debut.

== Muay Thai and kickboxing record ==
Professional kickboxing record
Date	Result	Opponent	Event	Location	Method	Round	Time
2011-09-12	Draw	(Azerbaijan) Zamig Athakishiyev	«Battle Show» 2011	Minsk, Belarus	Decision	4	3:00
2011-02-12	Loss	(Montenegro) Goran Radonjić	W5 League	Moscow, Russia	Ext.R.Decision	4	3:00
2010-12-16	Loss	(Ukraine) Pavel Zhuravlev	KOK World GP 2010 in Moscow, final	Odintsovo, Russia	2 Ext. R Decision (Split)	5	3:00
For KOK World GP 2010 in Moscow tournament.
2010-12-16	Win	(South Korea) Hyun Man Myung	KOK World GP 2010 in Moscow, semi finals	Odintsovo, Russia	KO (Left Hook)	3	0:31
2010-12-16	Win	(Azerbaijan) Vugar Javadov	KOK World GP 2010 in Moscow, quarter finals	Odintsovo, Russia	RTD	2	1:33
2010-07-30	Win	(Ukraine) Sergei Lascenko	Fight Club "The Octopus"	Minsk, Belarus	Decision (unanimous)	3	3:00
2010-04-17	Draw	(Ukraine) Pavel Zhuravlev	Big8 Grand Prix "European Selection"	Kharkiv, Ukraine	Decision draw	3	3:00
2009-03-26	Loss	(Ukraine) Pavel Zhuravlev	WBKF World Tournament (+93 kg) @ Club Arbat, semi finals	Moscow, Russia	Decision (Unanimous)	3	3:00
2008-10-30	Loss	(Ukraine) Pavel Zhuravlev	WBKF European Tournament (+93 kg) @ Club Arbat, final	Moscow, Russia	Decision (Majority)	3	3:00
For WBKF European Super Heavyweight (+93 kg) tournament title.
2008-10-30	Win	(Ukraine) Stanislav Belokon	WBKF European Tournament (+93 kg) @ Club Arbat, semi finals	Moscow, Russia	KO	3	
2008-05-29	Loss	(Ukraine) Pavel Zhuravlev	WBKF World Tournament (+93 kg) @ Club Arbat	Moscow, Russia	Decision (Split)	3	3:00
For WBKF World Super Heavyweight (+93 kg) tournament title.
2008-05-29	Win	(Ukraine) Sergei Lascenko	WBKF World Tournament (+93 kg) @ Club Arbat, semi finals	Moscow, Russia	Decision (unanimous)	3	3:00
2007-10-27	Win	(Czech Republic) Tomáš Hron	Angels of Fire II		Decision (Unanimous)	3	3:00
2007-04-18	Win	(Russia) Suren Kalachyan	WBKF European Tournament (+93 kg) @ Club Arbat, final	Moscow, Russia	Decision (Unanimous)	3	3:00
Win WBKF World Super Heavyweight (+93 kg) tournament title.
2007-04-18	Win	(Ukraine) Pavel Zhuravlev	WBKF European Tournament (+93 kg) @ Club Arbat, semi finals	Moscow, Russia	Decision (Split)	3	3:00
2007-01-17	Win	(Moldova) Oleg Zdragush	Fight Club Arbat	Moscow, Russia	Decision (Unanimous)	3	3:00
2006-12-20	Win	(Belarus) Andrey Zuravkov	WBKF World Tournament (+93 kg) @ Club Arbat, super fight	Moscow, Russia	TKO	3	
2006-07-19	Loss	(Belarus) Sergei Gur	Fight Club Arbat	Moscow, Russia	Decision (Split)	5	3:00
For WBKF Eurasian Muay Thai title (+93 kg).
2006-04-26	Win	(Russia) Suren Kalachyan	Fight Club Arbat	Moscow, Russia	Decision (Unanimous)	3	3:00
2006-02-01	Win	(Russia) Denis Podolyachin	Fight Club Arbat	Moscow, Russia	KO	1	
2005-10-12	Win	(Russia) Telman Sherifov	Fight Club Arbat	Moscow, Russia	TKO	3	
2005-07-13	Loss	(Azerbaijan) Zabit Samedov	Fight Club Arbat	Moscow, Russia	TKO	4	
2005-03-30	Win	(Russia) Artem Yashnov	Fight Club Arbat	Moscow, Russia	KO	1	
2004-08-25	Win		Fight Club Arbat	Moscow, Russia	KO	4	
2004-07-07	Win	(Russia) Vladimir Marinin	Fight Club Arbat	Moscow, Russia	TKO	2	
2004-05-26	Win	(Ukraine) Maxim Neledva	Fight Club Arbat	Moscow, Russia	TKO	3	

Amateur kickboxing record
Date	Result	Opponent	Event	Location	Method	Round	Time
2013-10	Loss	(France) Abdarhmane Coulibaly	W.A.K.O World Championships 2013, K-1 Final +91 kg	Guaruja, Brasil			
Wins W.A.K.O. World Championship '13 K-1 Silver Medal +91 kg.
2013-10	Win	(Russia) Nadir Gadzhiev	W.A.K.O World Championships 2013, K-1 Semi Finals +91 kg	Guaruja, Brasil			
2013-10	Win	(New Zealand) Mika Maliefulu	W.A.K.O World Championships 2013, K-1 Quarter Finals +91 kg	Guaruja, Brasil			
2013-10	Win	(Ghana) Harry Nana Kwasi Ferguson Maxwill	W.A.K.O World Championships 2013, K-1 1st Round +91 kg	Guaruja, Brasil			
2012-05-	Loss	(Ukraine) Tsotne Rogava	IFMA European Championship 2012, Final	Antalya, Turkey	Decision	4	2:00
Wins 2012 IFMA European Championships +91kg Silver Medal.
2010-10	Win	(Italy) Alex Rossi	W.A.K.O European Championships 2010, K-1 Final +91 kg	Baku, Azerbaijan			
Wins W.A.K.O. European Championship '10 K-1 Gold Medal +91 kg.
2010-10	Win	(Ukraine) Volodymyr Oliynyk	W.A.K.O European Championships 2010, K-1 Semi Finals +91 kg	Baku, Azerbaijan			
2010-10	Win	(Serbia) Dane Bokan	W.A.K.O European Championships 2010, K-1 Quarter Finals +91 kg	Baku, Azerbaijan	Decision (Split)	3	2:00
2010-12-	Loss	(Belgium) Filip Verlinden	2010 IFMA World Championships, Semi Finals	Bangkok, Thailand	Decision	4	2:00
Wins the 2010 IFMA World Championships +91 kg/200 lb Bronze Medal.
2009-10	Win	(Brazil) Guto Inocente	W.A.K.O World Championships 2009, K-1 Final + 91 kg kg	Villach, Austria			
Wins W.A.K.O. World Championship '09 K-1 Gold Medal + 91 kg kg.
2009-10	Win	(Russia) Alexei Papin	W.A.K.O World Championships 2009, K-1 Semi Finals + 91 kg kg	Villach, Austria			
2009-10	Win	(Spain) Frank Muñoz	W.A.K.O World Championships 2009, K-1 1/4 Finals + 91 kg kg	Villach, Austria			
2007-09-30	Win	(Russia) Dzhamal Kasumov	W.A.K.O World Championships 2007, K-1 Rules Final +91 kg	Belgrade, Serbia			
Wins W.A.K.O. World Championship '07 K-1 Rules Gold Medal +91 kg.
2007-09-?	Win	(Montenegro) Mirko Vlahović	W.A.K.O World Championships 2007, K-1 Rules Semi Finals +91 kg	Belgrade, Serbia			
2007-09-?	Win	(Poland) Igor Kolacin	W.A.K.O World Championships 2007, K-1 Rules Quarter Finals +91 kg	Belgrade, Serbia			
2006-11	Win	(Croatia) Valentino Venturini	W.A.K.O European Championships 2006, Thai-Boxing Rules Final +91 kg	Skopje, Macedonia	KO		
Wins W.A.K.O. European Championship '06 Thai-Boxing Rules Gold Medal +91 kg.
2006-11	Win	(Serbia) Mladen Božić	W.A.K.O European Championships 2006, Thai-Boxing Rules Semi Finals +91 kg	Skopje, Macedonia			
2006-11	Win	(Slovenia) Jasmin Bečirović	W.A.K.O European Championships 2006, Thai-Boxing Rules Quarter Finals +91 kg	Skopje, Macedonia	Decision (Unanimous)		
Legend: Win Loss Draw/No contest Notes

== 2020 Belarusian protests and imprisonment ==
Kudin participated in protests in Belarus in August 2020. Then in Maladzyechna, Alexey Kudzin fought with OMON, after which he was brutally detained and became a subject of a criminal case. He was charged under Article 364 of the Criminal Code (violence against an employee of the internal affairs bodies). From August to mid-November, he was under house arrest, and then left Belarus for Western Europe. Then he moved to a monastery in Russia, where he was detained at the request of the Belarusian authorities. He was extradited to Belarus, where he was eventually sentenced to 2 years and 6 months in a general-security colony. He served his sentence in the Shklov colony. He was released at the end of 2022. On August 12, 2021, human rights organizations in Belarus recognized him as a political prisoner.

== See also ==
- List of WAKO Amateur World Championships
- List of WAKO Amateur European Championships
- List of K-1 events
- List of male kickboxers
