= Andrei Kulebin =

Belarusian Muay Thai welterweight kickboxer

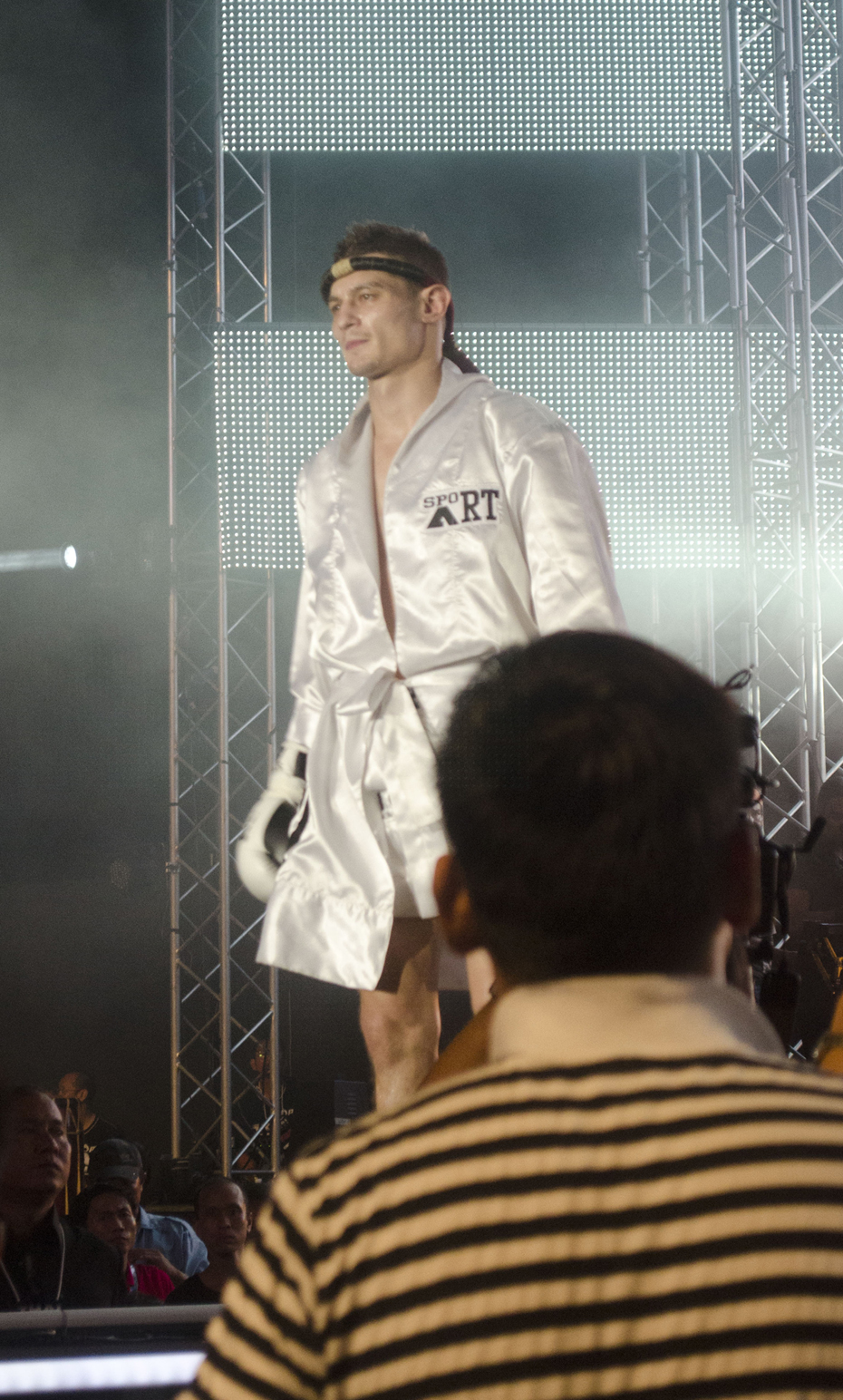
- Kulebin at Thai Fight 2012 Final
- Born: May 14, 1984 (age 42); Neustrelitz, Germany
- Other names: Bullet
- Nationality: Belarus
- Height: 1.74 m (5 ft 8 1/2 in)
- Weight: 67 kg (148 lb; 10.6 st)
- Division: Welterweight; Lightweight; Featherweight; Bantamweight; Flyweight
- Style: Muay Thai
- Stance: Orthodox
- Fighting out of: Minsk, Belarus
- Team: Gym "Kick Fighter"
- Trainer: Evgeni Dobrotvorski

Kickboxing record
- Total: 99
- Wins: 73
- Losses: 24
- By knockout: 7
- Draws: 2

Amateur record
- Total: 132
- Wins: 122
- Losses: 10
- Last updated on: February 27, 2017

Medal record

Men's Muay Thai

Representing Belarus

World Championships
| Bronze medal – third place | 2006 Bangkok | 60 kg |
| Gold medal – first place | 2007 Bangkok | 67 kg |
| Bronze medal – third place | 2008 Busan | 67 kg |
| Silver medal – second place | 2009 Bangkok | 67 kg |
| Gold medal – first place | 2012 Saint Petersburg | 67 kg |
| Gold medal – first place | 2014 Langkawi | 67 kg |
| Silver medal – second place | 2015 Bangkok | 71 kg |
| Bronze medal – third place | 2016 Jönköping | 71 kg |
| Silver medal – second place | 2018 Cancún | 71 kg |
| Silver medal – second place | 2021 Bangkok | 71 kg |

World Combat Games
| Gold medal – first place | 2013 St. Petersburg | 67 kg |

WMF World Championships
| Gold medal – first place | 2004 Bangkok | 57 kg |
| Gold medal – first place | 2005 Bangkok | 60 kg |
| Silver medal – second place | 2006 Bangkok | 60 kg |
| Gold medal – first place | 2007 Bangkok | 63.5 kg |

W.A.K.O. World Championships
| Gold medal – first place | 2001 Belgrade | 51 kg |
| Gold medal – first place | 2003 Yalta | 57 kg |

IAMTF World Championships
| Bronze medal – third place | 2001 Bangkok | 48 kg |
| Gold medal – first place | 2003 Bangkok | 55.3 kg |

European Championships
| Gold medal – first place | 2010 Velletri | 67 kg |
| Gold medal – first place | 2011 Antalya | 67 kg |
| Silver medal – second place | 2013 Lisbon | 67 kg |
| Gold medal – first place | 2019 Minsk | 71 kg |

IAMTF European Championships
| Gold medal – first place | 2002 Cyprus | 51 kg |

Andrei "Bullet" Kulebin (born 14 May 1984) is a Belarusian Muay Thai welterweight kickboxer fighting out of Minsk, Belarus for Gym "Kick Fighter". He is an 18 time Muay Thai and kickboxing world champion who has won international titles both at amateur and professional level from 51 kg to 67 kg and is considered one of the top pound for pound Muay Thai fighters outside of Thailand. In 2007 he was the first Muay Thai fighter in Belarus to be awarded the "Honored Master of Sport" by the countries president.

== Career/biography ==
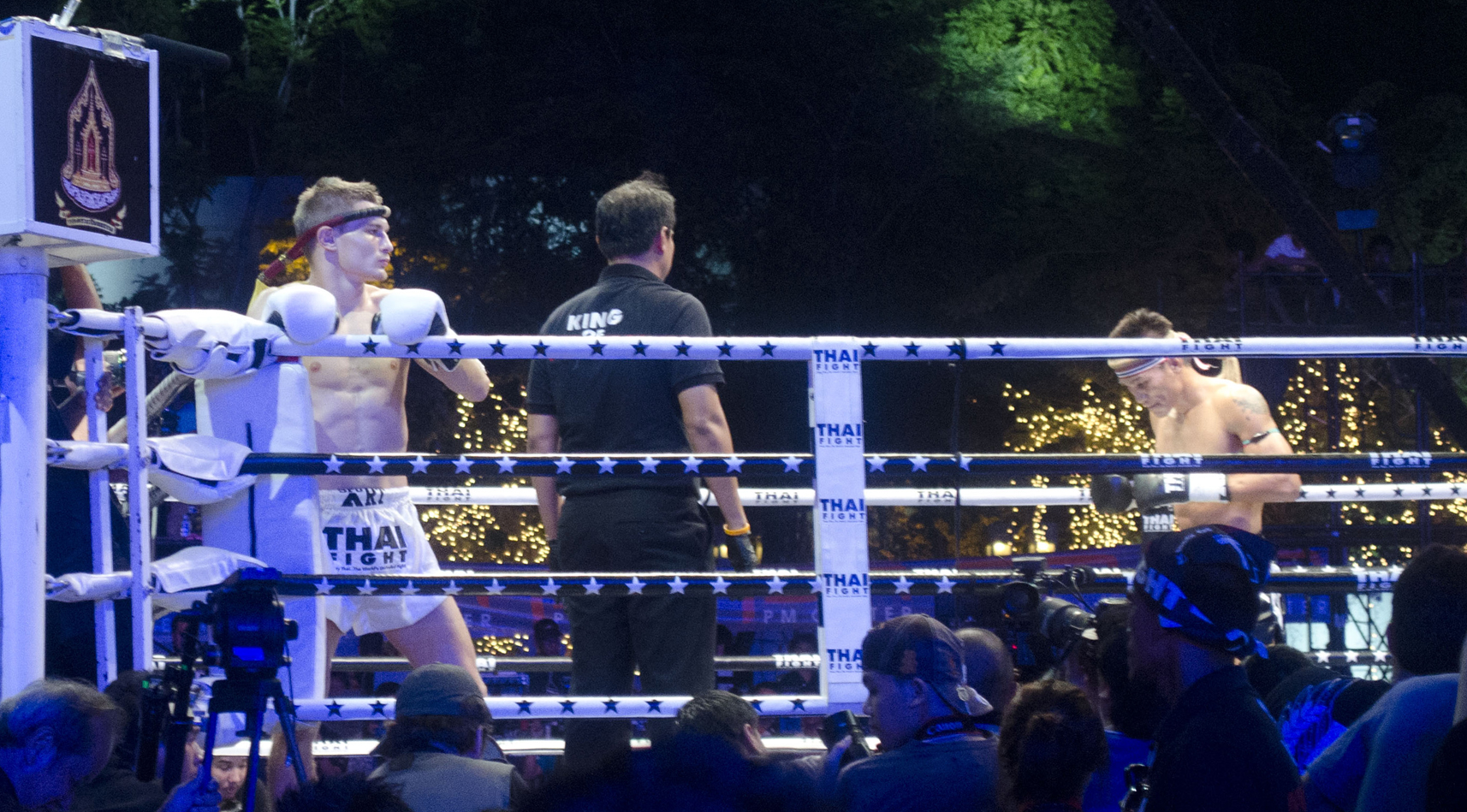
Ready to fight against Singmanee Kaewsamrit at Thai Fight 2012 Final

Kulebin was born on 14 May 1984 in Neustrelitz, Germany. He began his kickboxing education at the age of eight in Minsk where he studied Taekwondo, only to switch to Muay Thai four years later, aged twelve, when he joined his (still) current club Gym "Kick Fighter", run by trainer Evgeni Dobrotvorski. At his new gym he had access to some of the best facilities in Belarus, training with future world champions such as Dmitry Shakuta, Andrei Kotsur, Aliaksei Pekarchyk and Vasily Shish. As a teenager he competed in a number of amateur competitions in Belarus, winning the junior national title at 38 kg as well as making his pro debut in 1999. In 2001 he came third at the I.A.M.T.F. Amateur Muay Thai World Championships in Bangkok, Thailand and went even better later that year winning gold in the 51 kg category at the W.A.K.O. World Championships in 2001. Success in the amateur circuit transferred across to the professional game in 2002 where Kulebin defeated compatriot Alexei Talantov to win the World Kickboxing Network (W.K.N.) European title, followed swiftly by the organizations intercontinental title, also in 2002. Between 2002 and 2005 Kulebin won more titles – winning gold medals at the I.A.M.T.F. (world & European), W.A.K.O. and W.M.F. world championships, as well as claiming two W.K.N. professional world titles at super bantamweight and featherweight respectively. He also suffered his first ever professional defeat losing to Rudolf Durica in an unsuccessful attempt for Durica's W.P.M.F. title at the King's Birthday event in Bangkok, Thailand at the end of 2005. By 2006, at the age of 21, Kulebin had won seven world titles.

In October 2006, Kulebin entered the annual W.M.C. I-1 World Muay Thai Grand Prix, an eight-man competition for some of the top Muay Thai fighters at 63.5 kg. He emerged victorious at the tournament in Hong Kong, gaining revenge over the man who had inflicted his first pro defeat and reigning I-1 champion, Rudolph Durica, in the semi-finals, before defeating Santichai Or Boonchauy in the final. He re-entered the W.M.C. I-1 World Grand Prix again the next year as defending champion once more defeating the two men he had faced the previous year, beating Santichai in the semi-finals and Durica in the final. His victory in Hong Kong was tempered somewhat by his defeat against Neung Songnarong and the loss of the W.K.N. intercontinental title he had won back in 2002 (this was Kulebin's first defence of the title in five years due to a lack of suitable opposition). He also had success on the amateur circuit winning three world championships in one year; W.M.F., W.A.K.O. and I.F.M.A. He followed up this success the following year by once again winning the W.M.C. I-1 World Grand Prix, for the third successive year.

2009 was another successful year for Kulebin, winning the W.M.C. featherweight title from reigning world champion Mosab Amrani at the Champions of Champions II event in Jamaica and then defending his title by knocking out Michael Dicks towards the end of the year, with a head kick. Sandwiched between these title fights was a tournament win at the inaugural W.K.N. Big-8 competition held in Kulebin's home town of Minsk. The next year was not quite as successful as he suffered three defeats to Thai opposition losing to Jeeprasak Inudom at the quarter-final stage of the I.F.M.A. world championships (the first time in years he had failed to make at least the podium at an amateur championship) and twice to Sudsakorn Sor Klinmee in W.K.N. events, both of which were for prestigious titles within the organization. Despite a relatively unsuccessful year, Kulebin still had time to win two world titles, winning the W.M.C. I-1 tournament for the fourth time and the little-known World Dynamite Thaiboxing title against Imran Khan in Sheffield, as well as gold at the IFMA European Championships. At the beginning of 2011 Kulebin won another medal at amateur level, winning gold at the I.F.M.A. European championships in Antalya, Turkey.

On 31 March 2012 he was defeated by Liam Harrison in Manchester, UK by TKO in round 3.

He defeated Crice Boussoukou via decision in the quarter-finals of the 2012 Thai Fight 67 kg Tournament at Thai Fight 2012: King of Muay Thai in Bangkok, Thailand on October 23, 2012.

He then beat Adaylton Pereira de Freitas by decision in the tournament semi-finals in Nakhon Ratchasima, Thailand on November 25, 2012.

He lost to Singmanee Kaewsamrit on points again in the final on December 16, 2012.

On May 6, 2013, Kulebin defeated Umar Semata and Petchaswin Seatransferry to win the MAX Muay Thai 1 tournament in Surin, Thailand.

He will fight Saenchai PKSaenchaimuaythaigym at Combat Renaissance in China on September 17, 2013.

He lost to eventual champion Sagetdao Petpayathai on points in the semi-finals of the MAX Muay Thai 5: The Final Chapter tournament in Khon Kaen, Thailand on December 10, 2013.

He defeated Yang Zhou via UD at Combat Banchamek in Surin, Thailand on April 14, 2014.

Kulebin was initially set to fight Lee Sung-Hyun at the K-1 World MAX 2013 World Championship Tournament Final in Pattaya, Thailand on July 26, 2014. The event was postponed due to the 2014 Thai coup d'état, however.

On September 17, 2016, Kulebin was defeated by Fabio Pinca in Paris, France.

On December 10, 2016, Kulebin was defeated by Buakaw Banchamek in Beirut, Lebanon.

== Titles ==
=== Professional ===
- 2015 WLF-World 8 Man Tournament Championship Runner-Up -67 kg
- 2014 IPCC World champion -67 kg
- 2014 Kunlun Fight 1 Tournament 2nd place
- 2013 MAX Muay Thai 1 Tournament Champion
- 2012 Thai Fight 67 kg Tournament 2nd place
- 2011 W.K.N. World Grand Prix Big-8 champion -66.7 kg
- 2010 World Dynamite Thaiboxing champion -66 kg
- 2010 W.K.N. World Grand Prix Big-8 runner up -66.7 kg
- 2010 W.M.C. I-1 World Grand Prix champion -66 kg
- 2009 W.M.C. world champion -63 kg (1st title defense)
- 2009 W.M.C. I-1 World Grand Prix runner up -66 kg
- 2009 W.K.N. World Grand Prix Big-8 champion -66.7 kg
- 2009 W.M.C. world champion -63 kg
- 2008 W.M.C. I-1 World Grand Prix champion -65 kg
- 2007 W.M.C. I-1 World Grand Prix champion -63.5 kg
- 2006 W.M.C. I-1 World Grand Prix champion -63.5 kg
- 2005 W.K.N. Muay Thai featherweight world champion -60.3 kg
- 2004 W.K.N. Muay Thai super bantamweight world champion -58.5 kg
- 2002-07 W.K.N. intercontinental champion
- 2002 W.K.N. European champion

=== Amateur ===
- 2021 I.F.M.A. World Muaythai Championships in Bangkok, Thailand (silver) -71 kg
- 2019 I.F.M.A European Muaythai Championships in Minsk, Belarus (gold) -71 kg
- 2018 I.F.M.A. World Muaythai Championships in Cancún, Mexico (silver) -71 kg
- 2016 I.F.M.A. World Muaythai Championships in Jönköping, Sweden (bronze) -71 kg
- 2016 I.F.M.A. European Muaythai Championships in Split, Croatia (gold) -71 kg
- 2015 I.F.M.A. Royal World cup Tournament in Bangkok, Thailand (silver) -71 kg
- 2014 I.F.M.A. World Muaythai Championships in Langkawi, Malaysia (gold) -67 kg
- 2014 I.F.M.A. European Muaythai Championships in Kraków, Poland (gold) -67 kg
- 2013 SportAccord World Combat Games Muaythai champion (gold) (-67 kg)
- 2013 I.F.M.A. European Muaythai Championships in Lisbon, Portugal (silver) -67 kg
- 2012 I.F.M.A. World Muaythai Championships in Saint Petersburg, Russia (gold) -67 kg
- 2011 I.F.M.A European Muaythai Championships in Antalya, Turkey (gold) -67 kg
- 2010 I.F.M.A European Muaythai Championships in Velletri, Italy (gold) -67 kg
- 2009 I.F.M.A. World Muaythai Championships in Bangkok, Thailand (silver) -67 kg
- 2008 I.F.M.A. World Muaythai Championships in Busan, South Korea (bronze) -67 kg
- 2007 I.F.M.A. World Muaythai Championships in Bangkok, Thailand (gold) -67 kg
- 2007 W.A.K.O. World Championships in Belgrade, Serbia (gold) - 63.5 kg (K-1 Rules)
- 2007 W.M.F. World Muaythai Championships in Bangkok, Thailand (gold) -63.5 kg
- 2006 I.F.M.A. World Muaythai Championships in Bangkok, Thailand (bronze) -60 kg
- 2006 W.M.F. World Muaythai Championships in Bangkok, Thailand (silver) -60 kg
- 2005 W.M.F. World Muaythai Championships in Bangkok, Thailand (gold) -60 kg
- 2004 W.M.F. World Muaythai Championships in Bangkok, Thailand (gold) -57 kg
- 2003 W.A.K.O. World Championships in Yalta, Ukraine (gold) -57 kg (Thai Boxing)
- 2003 I.A.M.T.F. World Muaythai Championships in Bangkok, Thailand (gold) -55.3 kg
- 2002 I.A.M.T.F. European Muaythai Championships in Cyprus (gold) -51 kg
- 2001 W.A.K.O. World Championships in Belgrade, Serbia & Montenegro (gold) -51 kg (Thai Boxing)
- 2001 I.A.M.T.F. World Muaythai Championships in Bangkok, Thailand (bronze) -48 kg
- x8 Belarusian national Muay Thai champion

== Professional Muay Thai record ==
Professional Kickboxing Record
73 Wins, 24 Losses
| Date | Result | Opponent | Event | Location | Method | Round | Time |
| 2021-04-17 | Draw | (Belarus) Farkhad Akhmedjanov | WTKF | Minsk, Belarus | Draw | 3 | 3:00 |
| 2019-05-01 | Draw | (China) Zhang Chunyu | MAS Fight | China | Draw | 1 | 9:00 |
| 2018-12-01 | Loss | (China) Yang Zhuo | Wu Lin Feng 2018: WLF -67kg World Cup 2018-2019 6th round | Zhengzhou, China | Decision (Split) | 3 | 3:00 |
| 2018-10-06 | Win | (Russia) Sergey Kosykh | Wu Lin Feng 2018: WLF -67kg World Cup 2018-2019 4th round | Shangqiu, China | Decision | 3 | 3:00 |
| 2018-08-04 | Win | (China) Hu Yafei | Wu Lin Feng 2018: WLF -67kg World Cup 2018-2019 2nd round | Zhengzhou, China | Decision | 3 | 3:00 |
| 2018-02-03 | Win | (China) Gu Hui | kunlun Fight 69 | China | Decision (Unanimous) | 3 | 3:00 |
| 2017-10-31 | Win | (Thailand) Singmanee Kaewsamrit | World Muaythai Charity Fight | Hong Kong, China | Decision (Unanimous) | 3 | 3:00 |
| 2017-09-30 | Loss | (Thailand) Sibmean Sitchefboontham | All Star Fight 2 | Bangkok, Thailand | Decision | 3 | 3:00 |
| 2017-08-27 | Loss | (Ukraine) Sergey Kulyaba | Kunlun Fight 65 World MAX Tournament Final 16 | Qingdao, China | Ext.R Decision (2–3) | 4 | 3:00 |
| 2017-02-26 | Win | (China) Kong Lingfeng | Kunlun Fight 57 - World MAX 2017 Group 2 Tournament Final | Sanya, China | Decision (Unanimous) | 3 | 3:00 |
Qualified to Kunlun Fight 2017 70kg World Max Tournament Final 16.
| 2017-02-26 | Win | (Belgium) Ali Makhi | Kunlun Fight 57 - World MAX 2017 Group 2 Tournament Semi-finals | Sanya, China | Decision (Unanimous) | 3 | 3:00 |
| 2017-01-01 | Win | (China) Wu Xuesong | Kunlun Fight 56 | Sanya, China | Decision | 3 | 3:00 |
| 2016-12-10 | Loss | (Thailand) Buakaw Banchamek | Phoenix Fighting Championship | Lebanon | Decision | 3 | 3:00 |
For the vacant PFC Lightweight Championship.
| 2016-09-17 | Loss | (France) Fabio Pinca | Wicked One Duel | Paris, France | Decision (unanimous) | 5 | 3:00 |
| 2016-08-20 | Loss | (China) Tian Xin | Kunlun Fight 50 – 2016 70kg World MAX Tournament Final 16 | Jinan, China | Decision (unanimous) | 3 | 3:00 |
| 2016-07-10 | Win | (Australia) Victor Nagbe | Kunlun Fight 47 – 70 kg Tournament, Final | Nanjing, China | Decision (unanimous) | 3 | 3:00 |
Qualified to Kunlun fight 2016 70kg Tournament Final 16.
| 2016-07-10 | Win | (Portugal) Diogo Neves | Kunlun Fight 47 – 70 kg Tournament, Semi-finals | Nanjing, China | Decision (unanimous) | 3 | 3:00 |
| 2016-01-23 | Loss | (China) Qiu Jianliang | WLF World 67 kg 8 Man Tournament, Final | Shanghai, China | KO (Right Hook) | 1 | 1:51 |
For the WLF World 8 Man Tournament title -67Kg.
| 2016-01-23 | Win | (China) Xie Lei | WLF World 67 kg 8 Man Tournament, Semi-finals | Shanghai, China | Decision (unanimous) | 3 | 3:00 |
| 2016-01-23 | Win | (China) Feng Jie | WLF World 67 kg 8 Man Tournament, Quarter-finals | Shanghai, China | Ext.R Decision (unanimous) | 4 | 3:00 |
| 2015-07-04 | Loss | (China) Qiu Jianliang | Wu Lin Feng World Championship 2015 – 67 kg Tournament, Semi-finals | China | Decision | 3 | 3:00 |
| 2015-06-11 | Loss | (Thailand) Aikpracha Meenayotin | Final Legend, Final | Macau, China | Decision | 3 | 3:00 |
For the Final Legend 4-Man tournament.
| 2015-06-11 | Win | (China) Gu Hui | Final Legend, Semi-finals | Macau, China | Decision | 3 | 3:00 |
| 2015-06-06 | Win | (China) Tie Yinghua | Wu Lin Feng World Championship 2015 – 67 kg Tournament, Quarter-finals | Jiyuan, China | Decision | 3 | 3:00 |
| 2015-06-06 | Win | (China) Ji Xiang | Wu Lin Feng World Championship 2015 – 67 kg Tournament, First Round | Jiyuan, China | Decision | 3 | 3:00 |
| 2015-05-02 | Win | (China) Zhao yan | Kunlun Fight 24 | Italy, Verona | Decision | 3 | 3:00 |
| 2014-10-11 | Loss | (South Korea) Lee Sung-Hyun | K-1 World MAX 2014 World Championship Tournament Final | Pattaya, Thailand | Extension round decision | 4 | 3:00 |
| 2014-09-13 | Win | (Iran) Seyedisa Alamdarnezam | Topking World Series - 70 kg Tournament, Final 16 | Minsk, Belarus | Decision (unanimous) | 3 | 3:00 |
| 2014-05-22 | Win | (Russia) Artem Pashporin | Grand Prix Russia Open | Nizhny Novgorod, Russia | Decision (unanimous) | 4 | 3:00 |
| 2014-05-22 | Win | (Thailand) Deo Phetsangkhat | Grand Prix Russia Open | Nizhny Novgorod, Russia | Decision (unanimous) | 4 | 3:00 |
| 2014-04-14 | Win | (China) Yang Zhuo | Combat Banchamek | Surin, Thailand | Decision (unanimous) | 3 | 3:00 |
| 2014-01-25 | Loss | (Thailand) Petsanguan Luktupfah | Kunlun Fight 1, Final | Bangkok, Thailand | Decision | | 3:00 |
For the Kunlun Fight 1 Tournament title.
| 2014-01-25 | Win | (Uganda) Umar Semata | Kunlun Fight 1, Semi-final | Bangkok, Thailand | | | |
| 2013-12-10 | Loss | (Thailand) Sagetdao Petpayathai | MAX Muay Thai 5: The Final Chapter, Semi-finals | Khon Kaen, Thailand | Decision | 3 | 3:00 |
| 2013-09-17 | Loss | (Thailand) Saenchai PKSaenchaimuaythaigym | Combat Renaissance | Hong Kong | Decision | 3 | 3:00 |
| 2013-05-06 | Win | (Thailand) Phetasawin Seatranferry | MAX Muay Thai 1, Final | Surin, Thailand | KO (High kick) | 2 | 1:15 |
Wins the MAX Muay Thai 1 Tournament title.
| 2013-05-06 | Win | (Uganda) Umar Semata | MAX Muay Thai 1, Semi-final | Surin, Thailand | Decision | 3 | 3:00 |
| 2012-12-16 | Loss | (Thailand) Singmanee Kaewsamrit | Thai Fight 2012: King of Muay Thai Tournament Finals, 67 kg Tournament Final | Bangkok, Thailand | Decision | 3 | 3:00 |
For the Thai Fight 2012 67kg Tournament title.
| 2012-11-25 | Win | (Brazil) Adaylton Pereira de Freitas | Thai Fight 2012: King of Muay Thai Tournament 2nd round, 67 kg Tournament Semi-finals | Nakhon Ratchasima, Thailand | Decision | 3 | 3:00 |
| 2012-10-23 | Win | (France) Crice Boussoukou | Thai Fight 2012: King of Muay Thai Tournament 1st round, 67 kg Tournament Quarter-finals | Bangkok, Thailand | Decision | 3 | 3:00 |
| 2012-06-24 | Loss | (Thailand) Singmanee Kaewsamrit | Channel 11 "Thailand vs. Russia" | Pattaya, Thailand | Decision | 5 | 3:00 |
| 2012-06-03 | Win | (Thailand) Phetasawin Seatranferry | WKN Kings of Muay Thai | Belarus | KO (Elbow) | 3 | |
| 2012-03-31 | Loss | (England) Liam Harrison | The Main Event | Manchester, England | TKO (Low kicks) | 3 | 1:00 |
| 2011-11-26 | Win | (Ukraine) Ruslan Kushnirenko | Big 8 WKN Tournament 2011, Final | Minsk, Belarus | Decision | 3 | 3:00 |
Wins W.K.N. World Grand Prix Big-8 2011 tournament title -66.7 kg.
| 2011-11-26 | Win | (France) Ibrahim Konate | Big 8 WKN Tournament 2011, Semi-finals | Minsk, Belarus | KO (Low Kick) | 3 | |
| 2011-11-26 | Win | (France) Loris Audoui | Big 8 WKN Tournament 2011, Quarter-finals | Minsk, Belarus | KO (Knee) | 2 | |
| 2011-05-31 | Loss | (Thailand) Saiyok Pumpanmuang | Fight Factory Arena 2011 | Hong Kong | TKO (Corner stop/cut by elbow) | 1 | 1:38 |
| 2011-03-12 | Win | (Italy) Angelo Campoli | Fight Code: Dragon Series Round 2 | Milan, Italy | TKO (Doc stop/cut by elbow) | 4 | 1:48 |
| 2011-01-29 | Loss | (Thailand) Sak Kaoponlek | Thai Boxe Mania | Turin, Italy | Decision | 5 | 3:00 |
| 2010-10-24 | Win | (Pakistan) Imran Khan | Showdown 8 | Sheffield, England, UK | Decision | 5 | 3:00 |
Wins vacant World Dynamite Thaiboxing title -66 kg.
| 2010-09-12 | Loss | (Thailand) Sudsakorn Sor Klinmee | W.K.N. World GP Big-8 Tournament '10, Final | Minsk, Belarus | TKO (Doc Stop/ Cut) | 2 | |
Fight was for W.K.N. World Grand Prix Big-8 2010 tournament title -66.7 kg.
| 2010-09-12 | Win | (Turkey) Erkan Varol | W.K.N. World GP Big-8 Tournament '10, Semi-finals | Minsk, Belarus | Decision | 3 | 3:00 |
| 2010-09-12 | Win | (Australia) Taylor Harvey | W.K.N. World GP Big-8 Tournament '10, Quarter-finals | Minsk, Belarus | Decision | 3 | 3:00 |
| 2010-03-23 | Win | (Thailand) Santichai Or Boonchauy | W.M.C. I-1 World GP '10, Final | Hong Kong | Decision (Unanimous) | 3 | 3:00 |
Wins W.M.C. I-1 World Muaythai Grand Prix 2010 tournament title -66 kg.
| 2010-03-23 | Win | (Turkey) Ümit Demirörs | W.M.C. I-1 World GP '10, Semi-finals | Hong Kong | TKO | 1 | |
| 2010-03-23 | Win | (Republic of Ireland) Josh Palmer | W.M.C. I-1 World GP '10, Quarter-finals | Hong Kong | Decision (Unanimous) | 3 | 3:00 |
| 2010-01-30 | Loss | (Thailand) Sudsakorn Sor Klinmee | Campionato Mondiale Thai Boxe | Turin, Italy | KO (Straight Right) | 2 | |
Fight was for vacant W.K.N. Muay Thai welterweight world title -66.7 kg.
| 2009-11-07 | Win | (England) Michael Dicks | MSA Muay Thai Premier League | Bolton, England, UK | KO (High Kick) | 1 | |
Retains W.M.C. featherweight world title -63 kg.
| 2009-09-12 | Win | (Thailand) Nopparat Keatkhamtorn | W.K.N. World GP Big-8 Tournament '09, Final | Minsk, Belarus | Decision (Unanimous) | 3 | 3:00 |
Wins W.K.N. World Grand Prix Big-8 2009 tournament title -66.7 kg.
| 2009-09-12 | Win | (Brazil) Leonardo Monteiro | W.K.N. World GP Big-8 Tournament '09, Semi-finals | Minsk, Belarus | Decision (Unanimous) | 3 | 3:00 |
| 2009-09-12 | Win | (Ukraine) Nicolai Tolochko | W.K.N. World GP Big-8 Tournament '09, Quarter-finals | Minsk, Belarus | KO | 2 | |
| 2009-06-26 | Win | (Morocco) Mosab Amrani | Champions of Champions II | Montego Bay, Jamaica | Decision (Unanimous) | 5 | 3:00 |
Wins Amrani's W.M.C. featherweight world title -63 kg.
| 2009-04-21 | Loss | (Thailand) Santichai Or Boonchauy | W.M.C. I-1 World GP '09, Final | Hong Kong | TKO (leg injury) | 1 | 3:00 |
For W.M.C. I-1 World Muaythai Grand Prix 2009 tournament title -65 kg.
| 2009-04-21 | Win | (Australia) Mark Sarracino | W.M.C. I-1 World GP '09, Semi-finals | Hong Kong | Decision (Unanimous) | 3 | 3:00 |
| 2009-04-21 | Win | (Sweden) Peyman Shahrokni | W.M.C. I-1 World GP '09, Quarter-finals | Hong Kong | Decision (Unanimous) | 3 | 3:00 |
| 2008-10-27 | Win | (Thailand) Yodchatpol Scorpion Gym | W.M.C. I-1 World Grand Slam '08, Super Fight | Hong Kong | Decision (Unanimous) | 5 | 3:00 |
| 2008-04-30 | Win | (Thailand) Santichai Or Boonchauy | W.M.C. I-1 World GP '08, Final | Hong Kong | Decision (Unanimous) | 3 | 3:00 |
Wins W.M.C. I-1 World Muaythai Grand Prix 2008 tournament title -65 kg.
| 2008-04-30 | Win | (France) Mehdi Zatout | W.M.C. I-1 World GP '08, Semi-finals | Hong Kong | Decision (Unanimous) | 3 | 3:00 |
| 2008-04-30 | Win | (Brazil) Leonardo Monteiro | W.M.C. I-1 World GP '08, Quarter-finals | Hong Kong | Decision (Unanimous) | 3 | 3:00 |
| 2007-11-11 | Win | (France) Guillaume Mautz | Kings of Muay Thai - Russia | Kostroma, Russia | Decision | 5 | 3:00 |
| 2007-10-15 | Win | (Thailand) Prayoon Sriwiang | WW.M.C. I-1 World Grand Slam '07, Super Fight | Hong Kong | Decision | 5 | 3:00 |
| 2007-06-01 | Loss | (Thailand) Neung Songnarong | Belarus vs Thailand | Minsk, Belarus | TKO (Doc Stop/Cut) | 1 | |
Loses W.K.N. intercontinental title.
| 2007-05-16 | Win | (Slovakia) Rudolf Durica | W.M.C. I-1 World GP '07, Final | Hong Kong | TKO (Doc Stop/Cut) | 1 | |
Wins W.M.C. I-1 World Muaythai Grand Prix 2007 tournament title -63,5 kg.
| 2007-05-16 | Win | (Thailand) Santichai Or Boonchauy | W.M.C. I-1 World GP '07, Semi-finals | Hong Kong | KO (Straight Right) | 2 | |
| 2007-05-16 | Win | (Cambodia) Chawan Dasri | W.M.C. I-1 World GP '07, Quarter-finals | Hong Kong | TKO (Doc Stop/Cut) | 3 | 2:57 |
| 2006-10-09 | Win | (Thailand) Santichai Or Boonchauy | W.M.C. I-1 World GP '06, Final | Hong Kong | Decision | 3 | 3:00 |
Wins W.M.C. I-1 World Muaythai Grand Prix 2006 tournament title -63,5 kg.
| 2006-10-09 | Win | (Slovakia) Rudolf Durica | W.M.C. I-1 World GP '06, Semi-finals | Hong Kong | Decision (Split) | 3 | 3:00 |
| 2006-10-09 | Win | (Switzerland) Benjamin Ritter | W.M.C. I-1 World GP '06, Quarter-finals | Hong Kong | TKO (Ref Stop) | 1 | |
| 2005-12-05 | Loss | (Slovakia) Rudolf Durica | King's Birthday, Lumpinee Stadium | Bangkok, Thailand | Decision | 5 | 3:00 |
Fight was for Durica's W.P.M.F. Muay Thai world title -61.5 kg.
| 2005-09-30 | Win | (Morocco) Jalal Echaouchi | Kings of Muaythai: Belarus vs Europe | Minsk, Belarus | KO | 2 | |
Wins vacant W.K.N. Muay Thai featherweight world title -60.3 kg.
| 2004-07-01 | Win | (United States) Raul Llopis | Kings of Muaythai: Team USA vs. Team Belarus | Minsk, Belarus | Decision | 5 | 3:00 |
Wins Llopis's W.K.N. Muay Thai super bantamweight world title -58.5 kg.
| 2002-?-? | Win | (Ukraine) Bogdan Lukin | Belarus vs Ukraine | Minsk, Belarus | | | |
| 2002-09-14 | Win | (England) Adam Johnson | Night of KO | Sopot, Poland | KO | 5 | |
| 2002-?-? | Win | (Belarus) Alexei Talantov | | Poland | | | |
Wins W.K.N. Muay Thai European title.
Legend: Win Loss Draw/No contest Notes

== Amateur Muay Thai record ==
Amateur Kickboxing Record
122 Wins, 10 Losses
| Date | Result | Opponent | Event | Location | Method | Round | Time |
| 2022-02-14 | Loss | (Ukraine) Oleksandr Yefimenko | I.F.M.A. European Muaythai Championships 2022, First Round -71 kg | Bangkok, Thailand | Decision (Unanimous) | 2 | 2:00 |
| 2021-12-11 | Loss | (France) Jimmy Vienot | I.F.M.A. World Muaythai Championships 2019, Finals -71 kg | Bangkok, Thailand | Decision (Unanimous) | 3 | 2:00 |
Wins the I.F.M.A. World Championships Silver Medal -71kg.
| 2021-12-10 | Win | (Turkey) Onur Seker | I.F.M.A. World Muaythai Championships 2021, Semifinals -71 kg | Bangkok, Thailand | Decision (Unanimous) | 3 | 2:00 |
| 2021-12-09 | Win | (Ukraine) Serhii Otverchenko | I.F.M.A. World Muaythai Championships 2021, Quarterfinals -71 kg | Bangkok, Thailand | Decision (Unanimous) | 3 | 2:00 |
| 2021-12-08 | Win | (Uruguay) Enzo Vaz Martins | I.F.M.A. World Muaythai Championships 2021, Second Round -71 kg | Bangkok, Thailand | Decision (Unanimous) | 1 | 2:00 |
| 2021-12-07 | Win | (Greece) Pavlos Bamis | I.F.M.A. World Muaythai Championships 2021, First Round -71 kg | Bangkok, Thailand | Decision (Unanimous) | 3 | 2:00 |
| 2019-11-10 | Win | (Russia) Dmitrii Changeliia | I.F.M.A. European Muaythai Championships 2019, Finals -71 kg | Minsk, Belarus | Decision (Unanimous) | 3 | 2:00 |
Wins the I.F.M.A. European Championships Gold Medal -71kg.
| 2019-11-08 | Win | (Lithuania) Mindaugas Narauskas | I.F.M.A. European Muaythai Championships 2019, Semifinals -71 kg | Minsk, Belarus | Decision (Unanimous) | 2 | 2:00 |
| 2019-11-06 | Win | (Azerbaijan) Tahmasib Kerimov | I.F.M.A. European Muaythai Championships 2019, Quarterfinals -71 kg | Minsk, Belarus | Decision (Unanimous) | 1 | 2:00 |
| 2018-05-19 | Loss | (Thailand) Komsan Tantakhob | I.F.M.A. World Muaythai Championships 2018, Finals -71 kg | Cancún, Mexico | Decision (Unanimous) | 3 | 2:00 |
Wins the I.F.M.A. World Championships Silver Medal -71kg.
| 2018-05-16 | Win | (Kazakhstan) Namik Neftaliyev | I.F.M.A. World Muaythai Championships 2018, Semifinals -71 kg | Cancún, Mexico | Decision (Unanimous) | 3 | 2:00 |
| 2018-05-14 | Win | (Peru) Ian Escuza | I.F.M.A. World Muaythai Championships 2018, Quarterfinals -71 kg | Cancún, Mexico | Decision (Unanimous) | 3 | 2:00 |
| 2018-05-12 | Win | (Mexico) Marco Antonio Fuentes Garibay | I.F.M.A. World Muaythai Championships 2018, First Round -71 kg | Cancún, Mexico | Decision (Unanimous) | 3 | 2:00 |
| 2016-05-26 | Loss | (Thailand) Muensang Suppachai | I.F.M.A. World Muaythai Championships 2016, Semi-finals -71 kg | Jönköping, Sweden | Decision (Unanimous) | 3 | 2:00 |
Wins the I.F.M.A. World Muaythai Championships Bronze Medal -71 kg.
| 2016-05-23 | Win | (Finland) Teemu Hellevaara | I.F.M.A. World Muaythai Championships 2016, Quarter-finals -71 kg | Jönköping, Sweden | Decision (Unanimous) | 3 | 2:00 |
| 2015-05-19 | Win | (Iran) Seyed Kaveh Soleimani | I.F.M.A. World Muaythai Championships 2016, Eighth Finals -71 kg | Jönköping, Sweden | Decision | 3 | 2:00 |
| 2015-08-23 | Loss | (Thailand) Muensang Suppachai | I.F.M.A. Royal World cup Tournament 2015, Finals -71 kg | Bangkok, Thailand | Decision | 3 | 2:00 |
Wins the I.F.M.A. Royal World cup Tournament Silver Medal -71kg.
| 2015-08-21 | Win | (France) Numa Decagwy | I.F.M.A. Royal World cup Tournament 2015, Semi-finals -71 kg | Bangkok, Thailand | Decision | 3 | 2:00 |
| 2015-08-17 | Win | (Kazakhstan) Akzhanov Rustem | I.F.M.A. Royal World cup Tournament 2015, Quarter-finals -71 kg | Bangkok, Thailand | | | |
| 2015-08-14 | Win | (Libya) Ali Garada | I.F.M.A. Royal World cup Tournament 2015, Eighth Finals -71 kg | Bangkok, Thailand | Decision | 3 | 2:00 |
| 2014-09- | Win | (Poland) Marcin Lepkowski | 2014 IFMA European Championships, Final | Kraków, Poland | DEC | 3 | 3:00 |
Wins 2014 IFMA European Championships -67kg Gold Medal.
| 2014-09- | Win | (Ukraine) Sergey Kulyaba | 2014 IFMA European Championships, Semi-finals | Kraków, Poland | DEC | 3 | 3:00 |
| 2014-09- | Win | (Russia) Takhmasib Kerimov | 2014 IFMA European Championships, Quarter-finals | Kraków, Poland | DEC | 3 | 3:00 |
| 2014-09- | Win | (Kazakhstan) Zhanserik Amirzhanov | 2014 IFMA European Championships, 1/8 Finals | Kraków, Poland | DEC | 3 | 3:00 |
| 2014-05- | Win | (Turkey) Ali Batmaz | I.F.M.A. World Muaythai Championships 2014, Final -67 kg | Langkawi, Malaysia | | | |
Wins the 2014 I.F.M.A. World Championships -67kg Gold Medal.
| 2014-05- | Win | (Thailand) Somwang Sittisak | I.F.M.A. World Muaythai Championships 2014, Semi-finals -67 kg | Langkawi, Malaysia | | | |
| 2014-05- | Win | (Algeria) Hamza Rahmani | I.F.M.A. World Muaythai Championships 2014, Quarter-finals -67 kg | Langkawi, Malaysia | | | |
| 2014-05- | Win | (Italy) Alessio Arduini | I.F.M.A. World Muaythai Championships 2014, Eighth Finals -67 kg | Langkawi, Malaysia | | | |
| 2013-10-23 | Win | (Ukraine) Sergey Kulyaba | SportAccord World Combat Games, final (67 kg) | Saint-Petersburg, Russia | DEC | 3 | 3:00 |
Wins SportAccord World Combat Games 67kg gold medal.
| 2013-10-21 | Win | (Kazakhstan) Amirzhanov Zhanserik | SportAccord World Combat Games, semifinal (67 kg) | Saint-Petersburg, Russia | DEC | 3 | 3:00 |
| 2013-10-19 | Win | (United Kingdom) Barkhouse Jackson | SportAccord World Combat Games, quarterfinal (67 kg) | Saint-Petersburg, Russia | DEC | 3 | 3:00 |
| 2013-07- | Loss | (Ukraine) Sergey Kulyaba | 2013 IFMA European Championship, Final | Lisbon, Portugal | Decision | 4 | 2:00 |
Wins 2013 IFMA European Championships -67kg Silver Medal.
| 2013-07-25 | Win | (Poland) Marcin Łepkowski | 2013 IFMA European Championship, Semi-final | Lisbon, Portugal | Decision | 4 | 2:00 |
| 2012-09-13 | Win | (Germany) Juri Kehl | 2012 IFMA World Championships, Final | Saint Petersburg, Russia | Decision | 4 | 2:00 |
Wins the 2012 I.F.M.A. World Championships -67kg Gold Medal.
| 2012-09-11 | Win | (Thailand) Teerapong Dee | 2012 IFMA World Championships, Semi-finals | Saint Petersburg, Russia | Decision | 4 | 2:00 |
| 2012-09-09 | Win | (Russia) Aleksei Ulianov | 2012 IFMA World Championships, Quarter-finals | Saint Petersburg, Russia | Decision | 4 | 2:00 |
| 2011-09- | Loss | (Thailand) Jeerasak Inudom | 2011 IFMA World Championships, Final | Tashkent, Uzbekistan | Decision | 4 | 2:00 |
Wins 2011 I.F.M.A. World Muaythai Championships Silver Medal -67kg.
| 2011-09-25 | Win | (Uzbekistan) Mavlonbek Kahorov | 2011 IFMA World Championships, Semi-finals | Tashkent, Uzbekistan | Decision | 4 | 2:00 |
| 2011-09-23 | Win | (Morocco) Souein | 2011 IFMA World Championships, Quarter-finals | Tashkent, Uzbekistan | Decision | 4 | 2:00 |
| 2011-04-29 | Win | (Germany) Juri Kehl | I.F.M.A. European Muaythai Championships '11, Final -67 kg | Antalya, Turkey | Decision | 4 | 2:00 |
Wins I.F.M.A. European Muaythai Championships Gold Medal -67 kg.
| 2011-04-28 | Win | (Ukraine) Sergey Kulyaba | I.F.M.A. European Muaythai Championships '11, Semi-finals -67 kg | Antalya, Turkey | | | |
| 2011-04-27 | Win | (Russia) Aleksei Ulianov | I.F.M.A. European Muaythai Championships '11, Quarter-finals -67 kg | Antalya, Turkey | TKO (Ref Stop) | 3 | |
| 2010-12-02 | Loss | (Thailand) Jeeprasak Inudom | I.F.M.A. World Muaythai Championships '10, Quarter-finals -67 kg | Bangkok, Thailand | Decision | 4 | 2:00 |
| 2010-05-30 | Win | (Spain) Emad Kadyaer | I.F.M.A. European Muaythai Championships 2010, Final -67 kg | Velletri, Italy | Decision | 4 | 2:00 |
Wins 2010 I.F.M.A. European Muaythai Championships Gold Medal -67 kg.
| 2010-05-29 | Win | (Russia) Rus Petrov | I.F.M.A. European Muaythai Championships 2010, Semi-final -67 kg | Velletri, Italy | Decision | 4 | 2:00 |
| 2010-05-28 | Win | (Sweden) Fredrik Svensson | I.F.M.A. European Muaythai Championships 2010, Quarter-final -67 kg | Velletri, Italy | TKO (Ref Stop) | 4 | |
| 2010-05-27 | Win | (Denmark) Martin Pavel Møller | I.F.M.A. European Muaythai Championships 2010, 1st round -67 kg | Velletri, Italy | | | |
| 2009-12-05 | Loss | (Thailand) Jeeprasak Inudom | I.F.M.A. World Muaythai Championships '09, Final -67 kg | Bangkok, Thailand | | | |
Wins I.F.M.A. World Muaythai Championships '09 Silver Medal -67 kg.
| 2009-12-? | Win | (Sweden) David Teymur | I.F.M.A. World Muaythai Championships '09, Semi-finals -67 kg | Bangkok, Thailand | Decision | 4 | 2:00 |
| 2008-09-30 | Loss | (Thailand) Somkit Tumanil | I.F.M.A. World Muaythai Championships '08, Semi-finals -67 kg | Busan, South Korea | | | |
Wins I.F.M.A. World Muaythai Championships '08 Bronze Medal -67 kg.
| 2007-12-04 | Win | (Thailand) Preecha Laoyonkam | I.F.M.A. World Muaythai Championships '07, Final -67 kg | Bangkok, Thailand | Decision | 4 | 2:00 |
Wins I.F.M.A. World Muaythai Championships '07 Gold Medal -67 kg.
| 2007-12-03 | Win | (Ukraine) Usov Vladyslan | I.F.M.A. World Muaythai Championships '07, Semi-finals -67 kg | Bangkok, Thailand | Decision | 4 | 2:00 |
| 2007-12-02 | Win | (Greece) Mixahaiahs Adhindagpos | I.F.M.A. World Muaythai Championships '07, Quarter-finals -67 kg | Bangkok, Thailand | TKO | | |
| 2007-12-30 | Win | (Poland) Sebastian Wytwer | I.F.M.A. World Muaythai Championships '07, 1st round -67 kg | Bangkok, Thailand | Decision | 4 | 2:00 |
| 2007-09-30 | Win | (Russia) Kurbanali Akaev | W.A.K.O World Championships 2007, K-1 Rules Final -63.5 kg | Belgrade, Serbia | | | |
Wins W.A.K.O. World Championship '07 K-1 Rules Gold Medal -63.5 kg.
| 2007-09-? | Win | (Serbia) Sreten Miletic | W.A.K.O World Championships 2007, K-1 Rules Semi-finals -63.5 kg | Belgrade, Serbia | | | |
| 2007-09-? | Win | (Italy) Federico Pacini | W.A.K.O World Championships 2007, K-1 Rules Quarter-finals -63.5 kg | Belgrade, Serbia | | | |
| 2007-09-? | Win | (Poland) Lukasz Plawecki | W.A.K.O World Championships 2007, K-1 Rules 1st round -63.5 kg | Belgrade, Serbia | | | |
| 2007-03-10 | Win | | W.M.F. World Muaythai Championships '07, Final -63.5 kg | Bangkok, Thailand | Decision | 4 | 2:00 |
Wins W.M.F. World Muaythai Championships '07 Gold Medal -63.5 kg.
| 2007-03-08 | Win | (Canada) Syd Barnier | W.M.F. World Muaythai Championships '07, Semi-finals -63.5 kg | Bangkok, Thailand | TKO (Knee) | 1 | |
| 2007-03-? | Win | | W.M.F. World Muaythai Championships '07, Quarter-finals -63.5 kg | Bangkok, Thailand | | | |
| 2007-03-04 | Win | (Poland) Michael Tomczykowski | W.M.F. World Muaythai Championships '07, 1st round -63.5 kg | Bangkok, Thailand | Decision | 4 | 2:00 |
| 2006-06-06 | Loss | (Thailand) Panupan Tanjad | I.F.M.A. World Muaythai Championships '06, Semi-finals -60 kg | Bangkok, Thailand | | | |
Wins I.F.M.A. World Muaythai Championships '06 Bronze Medal -67 kg.
| 2006-06-05 | Win | (Russia) Valentin Semenov | I.F.M.A. World Muaythai Championships '06, Quarter-finals -60 kg | Bangkok, Thailand | | | |
| 2006-03-26 | Loss | (Thailand) Boonnit Charoensit | W.M.F. World Muaythai Championships '06, Final -60 kg | Bangkok, Thailand | Decision | 4 | 2:00 |
Wins W.M.F. World Muaythai Championships '06 Silver Medal -60 kg.
| 2006-03-24 | Win | (Russia) Igor Petrov | W.M.F. World Muaythai Championships '06, Semi-finals -60 kg | Bangkok, Thailand | Decision | 4 | 2:00 |
| 2003-12-03 | Win | (France) Jonathan Muyal | I.A.M.T.F. World Muaythai Championships 2003, Final -55.3 kg | Bangkok, Thailand | | | |
Wins I.A.M.T.F. World Muaythai Championships '03 Gold Medal -55.3 kg.
| 2001-11-25 | Win | (Ukraine) Maxim Slipchenko | W.A.K.O. World Championships 2001, Thai-boxing Final -51 kg | Belgrade, Serbia | | | |
Wins W.A.K.O. World Championship '01 Thai-boxing Gold Medal -51 kg.
Legend: Win Loss Draw/No contest Notes

== See also ==
- List of male kickboxers
