= Berneung TopkingBoxing =

Muay Thai fighter

- Born: August 1, 1983 (age 43); Udon Thani province, Thailand
- Other names: Berneung Sakhomsin (เบอร์หนึ่ง ศักดิ์หอมศีล)
- Height: 173 cm (5 ft 8 in)
- Weight: 76 kg (168 lb; 12.0 st)
- Division: Welterweight; Middleweight
- Style: Muay Thai
- Stance: Orthodox
- Fighting out of: Bangkok, Thailand

Kickboxing record
- Total: 236
- Wins: 185
- Losses: 46
- Draws: 5

Berneung TopkingBoxing is a Thai Muay Thai fighter. He is a three time WPMF world champion, two time WPMF interim champion, and a WMC world champion.

== Titles and accomplishments ==
Muay Thai

- World Professional Muaythai Federation
  - 2014 WPMF World Interim -76.2 kg / Super Middleweight Champion
  - 2014 WPMF World -76.2 kg / Super Middleweight Champion
  - 2013 WPMF World Interim -76.2 kg / Super Middleweight Champion
  - 2013 WPMF World -72.5 kg / Middleweight Champion
  - 2013 WPMF World -76.2 kg / Super Middleweight Champion
- World Muaythai Council
  - 2014 WMC World -76.2 kg / Super Middleweight Champion

== Fight record ==
Kickboxing record
185 Wins , 46 Losses , 5 Draws
Date	Result	Opponent	Event	Location	Method	Round	Time
2016-02-14	Loss	(England) Thomas Carpenter	Max Muay Thai	Pattaya, Thailand	KO	2	
2015-07-04	Loss	(France) Yohan Lidon	MFC 2	France	TKO	4	
For the IMTU World Middleweight (-76 kg/168 lb) Title.
2015-04-01	Loss	(France) Adrien Rubis	WPMF Event	Bangkok, Thailand	Decision (Split)	5	3:00
Losses the WPMF Interim World Muaythai Middleweight title (-76.2 kg).
2014-12-04	Win	(France) Adrien Rubis	King's Birthday	Bangkok, Thailand	Decision	5	3:00
Defends the WPMF Interim World Muaythai Middleweight title (-76.2 kg).
2014-10-31	Win	(France) Florian Breau	Toyota Marathon	Thailand	KO (Right Cross)	2	
2014-04-04	Win	(France) Yohan Lidon	Warriors Night 3	Paris, France	Decision	5	3:00
2014-06-14	Win	(France) Abdallah Mabel	Monte Carlo Fighting Masters 2014	Monte Carlo, Monaco	TKO (injury)	3	
Wins the WMC World Middleweight (-72.5 kg/160 lb) Championship.
2013-12-04	Win	(Sweden) Tobias Alexandersson	King's Birthday	Bangkok, Thailand	Decision	5	3:00
Wins the WPMF Interim Muaythai (-76.2 kg) World Title.
2013-08-11	Win	(France) Raphaël Llodra	Queen's Cup	Bangkok, Thailand	Decision	5	3:00
Wins the WPMF World Muaythai Middleweight title (-72.5 kg).
2013-06-14	Win	(Sweden) Tobias Alexandersson	Muaythai Superfight	Pattaya, Thailand	TKO	4	
Wins the WPMF Muaythai (-76.2 kg) World Title.
2013-05-06	Loss	(Germany) Enriko Kehl	Thailand vs Europe 2013	Ulm, Germany	KO (Spinning Elbow)	4	
2013-03-11	Win	(England) Thomas Carpenter	Lad Krabang	Thailand	Decision	5	3:00
Wins the WPMF World Muaythai title (-76.2 kg).
2012-11-25	Loss	(Ukraine) Enriko Gogokhia	Thai Boxe Mania - 2012	Turin, Italy	Decision	3	3:00
2012-09-22	Win	(Thailand) Chanachai Kaewsamrit	Bali Muaythai Grand Match 2012	Bali, Indonesia	TKO (Broken Arm)	3	
2012-08-11	Loss	(Sweden) Tobias Alexandersson	Queen's Birthday	Bangkok, Thailand	Decision	5	3:00
For the WPMF Interim Muaythai (-72.6 kg) World Title.
2011-07-23	Win	(Thailand) Manasak Sitniwat	Thailand vs Challenger 2011	Bangkok, Thailand	KO (Left Uppercut)	2	
2010-03-25	Loss	(France) Yohan Lidon	Planet Battle	Hong Kong, China	Decision	5	3:00
2009-08-31	Win	(Thailand) Komkaew	Patong Boxing Stadium	Patong, Thailand	KO (Right Body Kick)	2	
2009-05-09	Win	(Thailand) Namsaknoi Yudthagarngamtorn	Royal Cup Of Kedah	Malaysia	Decision	5	3:00
2009-03-14	Loss	(Slovakia) Vladimír Moravčík	Gala Night Thaiboxing	Žilina, Slovakia	Decision (Majority)	5	3:00
2009-02-14	Loss	(Russia) Vagif Abdullaev	Surgut	Surgut, Russia	Decision (Split)	5	3:00
2009-02-05	Win	(Thailand)	Patong Boxing Stadium	Patong, Thailand	KO (Right Uppercut and Left Hook)	2	
2008-08-30	Win	(Thailand) Farkrut	Battle of Champions	Malaysia	KO (Right Cross)	3	
2008-07-25	Win	(Thailand) Namsaknoi Yudthagarngamtorn	Bangla Boxing Stadium	Patong, Thailand	Decision	5	3:00
2008-07-17	Win	(Thailand) Komkiat	Patong Boxing Stadium	Patong, Thailand	KO (Right Cross)	2	
2007-03-24	Loss	(Thailand) Saiyok Pumpanmuang	Rajadamnern Stadium	Bangkok, Thailand	TKO	5	
For Rajadamnern and WMC Super-lightweight (140 lb) titles.
2007-03-15	Loss	(Thailand) Saiyok Pumpanmuang	Daowrungchujarern Fights, Rajadamnern Stadium	Bangkok, Thailand	Decision	5	3:00
2006-08-17	Loss	(Thailand) Saiyok Pumpanmuang	Daorungchujaroen Fights, Rajadamnern Stadium	Bangkok, Thailand	TKO (Low kicks)	4	
Loses WMC Super-lightweight (140 lb) title.
2006-06-05	Win	(Thailand) Kaluhard Aikchumpon	Daorungchujarean, Rajadamnern Stadium	Bangkok, Thailand	Decision	5	3:00
2004-05-17	Win	(Thailand) Jakkawanlak Saktevan	Daorungchujarean, Rajadamnern Stadium	Bangkok, Thailand	Decision	5	3:00
2004-04-14	Win	(Thailand) Duanesarn Kiatsarika	Daorungchujarean, Rajadamnern Stadium	Bangkok, Thailand	Decision	5	3:00
2004-02-23	Loss	(Thailand) Big Ben Chor Praram 6	Daorungchujarean + Jarumueang Fights, Rajadamnern Stadium	Bangkok, Thailand	Decision (Unanimous)	5	3:00
2004-01-01	Win	(Thailand) Teapparit Sitkuanaim	Daorungchujarean + Jarumueang Fights, Rajadamnern Stadium	Bangkok, Thailand	Decision	5	3:00
2003-12-11	Draw	(Thailand) Big Ben Chor Praram 6	SUK Daorungchujarean, Rajadamnern Stadium	Bangkok, Thailand	Decision draw	5	3:00
2003-09-29	Loss	(Thailand) Jakawanlak Saktewan	SUK Daorungchujarean, Rajadamnern Stadium	Bangkok, Thailand	Decision	5	3:00
2003-08-27	Win	(Thailand) Big Ben Chor Praram 6	SUK Daorungchujarean, Rajadamnern Stadium	Bangkok, Thailand	Decision	5	3:00
Legend: Win Loss Draw/No contest Notes

== Lethwei record ==
Professional Lethwei record
0 wins, 1 losses, 1 draws
Date	Result	Opponent	Event	Location	Method	Round	Time
2016-10-09	Loss	(Myanmar) Too Too	GTG International Challenge Fights 2016	Yangon, Myanmar	KO (Punches)	3	
2015-02-04	Draw	(Myanmar) Tun Tun Min	68th Mon National Day	Ye Township, Myanmar	Draw	5	
Legend: Win Loss Draw/No contest Notes
