= Raphaël Llodra =

French Muay Thai Fighter (born 1992)

- Born: July 29, 1992 (age 34); France
- Nickname: Manimal
- Nationality: (France) French
- Height: 1.85 m (6 ft 1 in)
- Weight: 72.5 kg (160 lb; 11.42 st)
- Division: Middleweight
- Style: Muay Thai
- Fighting out of: Bonneuil, France
- Team: Mahmoudi Gym
- Trainer: Mahmoudi brothers
- Years active: 8 (2010–2018)

Kickboxing record
- Total: 43
- Wins: 33
- By knockout: 21
- Losses: 10

Raphaël Llodra (born July 29, 1992) is a French former Muay Thai Fighter. He is the former WBC Muaythai Middleweight World Champion and the former WMC Middleweight Intercontinental champion.

== Muaythai career ==
Llodra won the WMC Intercontinental title (-72 kg) from Marco Piqué at "Best of Siam 3" in Paris, on February 14, 2013.

He became the WBC middleweight World Champion in La Riche, France, by beating Jacub Gazdik on March 9, 2013.

Raphaël won an ISKA World Champion Belt against Sua Dam in Bagnolet, on May 4, 2013.

Llodra won a split decision against Panom Topkingboxing at Best of Siam 4 in Paris, France, on June 20, 2013.

He lost a close decision to Berneung TopkingBoxing in Bangkok at the Queen's cup 2013. The fight was for the WPMF World Title.

He fought Diogo Calado, during Enfusion 33, for the Enfusion 75 kg title. Llodra lost the fight by third-round TKO.

He met Saiyok Pumpanmuang at Thai Fight Paris on April 8, 2017, and won by unanimous decision.

== Titles ==
- 2013 ISKA World Muay Thai Champion (73 kg)
- 2013 WBC World Muaythai Middleweight champion (160 lbs/72.5 kg)
- 2013 WMC Muay Thai Intercontinental champion (72 kg)
- 2011 FMDA French Muay Thai champion Class B (75 kg)

== Professional Muaythai record ==
Professional Muaythai Record
33 Wins (21 (T)KO's), 10 Losses, Draw, No Contest
Date	Result	Opponent	Event	Location	Method	Round	Time
2018-05-19	Win	(China) Ni Shi	Wu Lin Feng 2018: World Championship Yichun	China	KO	2	
2018-04-07	Win	(Brazil) Jose Neto	Longyao dongfang	Weifang, China	Decision	3	
2017-05-06	Loss	(Slovakia) Pavol Garaj	Enfusion Live 50	Žilina, Slovakia	TKO (Referee stoppage)	1	
2017-04-08	Win	(Thailand) Saiyok Pumpanmuang	THAI Fight	Paris, France	Decision	3	
2016-11-19	Win	(China) Wang Anying	WLF Rise of Heroes	Martigny, Switzerland	KO	2	
2015-11-07	Loss	(Portugal) Diogo Calado	Enfusion Live 33	Martigny, Switzerland	TKO (Referee stoppage)	3	
For Enfusion World Title -75 kg.
2015-06-19	Win	(France) Samy Sana	Best of Siam VI	Paris, France	Decision (decision was changed due to dope-test failure)	5	
2015-04-18	Win	(Spain) Maximo Suarez	Enfusion Live	Tenerife	Decision	3	
2015-03-07	Win	(France) Kamel Mezatni	Le Choc des Légendes	Saint-Ouen, France	TKO (Doctor Stop)	3	
2014-01-25	Win	(France) Mohamed Houmer	La Ligue des Gladiateurs	Paris, France	TKO (Throw in the Towel)	2	
2013-12-14	Loss	(France) Mohamed Diaby	Victory K-1 Tournament	Levallois, France	Decision	3	
2013-12-14	Win	(France) Philippe Salmon	Victory K-1 Tournament	Levallois, France	Decision	3	
2013-08-11	Loss	(Thailand) Berneung Topkingboxing	Queen's Cup	Bangkok, Thailand	Decision	5	
For WPMF World Muaythai Middleweight title (-72.5 kg).
2013-06-20	Win	(Thailand) Panom Topkingboxing	Best of Siam 4	Paris, France	Decision (split)	5	
2013-05-04	Win	(Thailand) Sua Dam	La Nuit des Revanches	Bagnolet, France	KO (Knee)	1	
Wins ISKA World Muaythai Middleweight title (-73 kg).
2013-03-09	Win	(Czech Republic) Jakub Gazdík	Grande Soirée de la Boxe	La Riche, France	KO (Knee)	1	
Wins WBC World Muaythai Middleweight title (-72.5 kg).
2013-02-14	Win	(Suriname) Marco Piqué	Best of Siam 3	Paris, France	TKO (Gave Up)	4	3:00
Wins WMC Muay Thai Intercontinental title (-72 kg).
2012-12-08	Loss	(Slovakia) Vladimír Moravčík	Fight Explosion	Bratislava, Slovakia	Decision	3	
2012-11-22	Win	(France) Wendy Annonay	Best of Siam 2	Paris, France	TKO (Doctor Stop)	2	
2012-10-20	Win	(France) Sébastien Billiard	La Nuit de la Boxe Thai IV	Tours, France	TKO (Throw in the towel)	3	
2012-09-19	Loss	(Thailand) Armin Pumpanmuang Windy Sport	Thai Fight	Lyon, France	TKO (cut)	3	
2012-06-23	Win	(France) Wendy Annonay	Showthai Round 5	Aubervilliers, France	TKO (Gave up)	2	
2012-06-02	Win	(France) Max Dansan	La Nuit des Challenges 11	Saint-Fons, France	TKO (Gave up)	3	3:00
2012-04-28	Loss	(Thailand) Super X	Tournoi des 4 Continents	Bagnolet, France	Decision	3	
2012-04-28	Win	(France) Moussa Konaté	Tournoi des 4 Continents	Bagnolet, France	TKO (Referee Stoppage)	3	
2012-03-22	Win	(Thailand) Radompol PatongBoxingGym	Patong Boxing Stadium	Phuket, Thailand	TKO (Referee stoppage)	3	
2012-03-07	Win	(Thailand)	Bangla Boxing Stadium	Phuket, Thailand	KO (knee)	1	
2011-12-05	Win	(Brazil) Rajan Sasiprapa	King's Cup	Bangkok, Thailand	TKO (Referee stoppage)	2	
2011-11-14	Win	(Thailand) Tahan Ek	Patong boxing stadium	Phuket, Thailand	KO (knee)	3	
2011-10-23	Win	(New Zealand) Taylor Krahl Tiger MuayThai	Bangla Boxing Stadium	Phuket, Thailand	TKO (Referee Stoppage)	2	
2011-09-25	Loss	(Thailand) Chanaek PK MuayThai	Thai Fight	Bangkok, Thailand	Decision	3	
2011-08-29	Win	(Australia) Chris KYN MuayThai	Patong boxing stadium	Phuket, Thailand	Decision	5	
2011-08-11	Win	(Russia)	Queen's Cup	Bangkok, Thailand	KO (elbow)	1	
2011-07-27	Loss	(Thailand)	Bangla Boxing Stadium	Phuket, Thailand	Decision	5	
2011-07-18	Win	(Thailand)	Patong boxing stadium	Phuket, Thailand	TKO (Throw in the towel)	1	
2011-04-23	Win	(France) Mamadou Coulibaly	Le Choc des Ceintures	Villiers-sur-Marne, France	Decision	3	
2011-04-09	Win	(France) Nicolas Ravenelle	FMDA French Championship Class B	Paris, France	Decision	4	
Wins FMDA French Muay Thai Class B title (-75 kg).
2011-03-13	Win	(France) Brahima Camara	FMDA French Championship Class B	Paris, France	Decision	4	
2011-02-05	Win	(France) Nicolas Ravenelle	FMDA French Championship Class B	Athis-Mons, France	KO	1	
2011-01-29	Loss	(Italy) Christian Zahe	Thai Boxe Mania	Turin, Italia	TKO (Referee stoppage)	1	
Legend: Win Loss Draw/No contest Notes

== See also ==
- List of male kickboxers
