= Men's K-1 at WAKO World Championships 2007 Belgrade +91 kg =

Kickboxing tournament

The men's super heavyweight (over 91 kg/200.2 lbs) K-1 category at the W.A.K.O. World Championships 2007 in Belgrade was the heaviest of the K-1 tournaments, involving thirteen fighters from two continents (Europe and South America). Each of the matches was three rounds of two minutes each and were fought under K-1 rules.

Due to the shortage of fighters required for a sixteen-man tournament, three men had byes through to the quarter-finals. The tournament winner was Belarus's Aliaksei Kudzin who defeated the Russian Dzhamal Kasumov in the final to win gold. Defeated semi finalists Mirko Vlahovic from Montenegro and Mladen Bozic from Serbia won bronze medals.

== Results ==
1st round
(Poland) Igor Kolacin	WIN
(Estonia) Aleksandr Dansin
(Croatia) Leonardo Komsic
(Brazil) Guto Inocente	WIN
(Serbia) Mladen Bozic	WIN
(Italy) Pasquale De Ruvo
(Slovenia) Jasmin Becirovic	WIN
(Hungary) Tihamer Brunner
(Morocco) Mohamed Tazarin
(Bulgaria) Kostadin Kostov	WIN

Quarter-finals
(Belarus) Alexei Kudin	WIN
(Poland) Igor Kolacin
(Brazil) Guto Inocente
(Montenegro) Mirko Vlahovic	WIN
(Serbia) Mladen Bozic	WIN
(Slovenia) Jasmin Becirovic
(Bulgaria) Kostadin Kostov
(Russia) Dzhamal Kasumov	WIN

Semi-finals
(Belarus) Alexei Kudin	WIN
(Montenegro) Mirko Vlahovic
(Serbia) Mladen Bozic
(Russia) Dzhamal Kasumov	WIN

Final
(Belarus) Alexei Kudin	WIN
(Russia) Dzhamal Kasumov

== See also ==
- List of WAKO Amateur World Championships
- List of WAKO Amateur European Championships
- List of male kickboxers
