= Big Ben Chor Praram 6 =

Thai Muay Thai kickboxer

- Native name: บิ๊กเบน ช.พระราม 6
- Other names: Big Ben J. Rajadakorn; Big Ben Kesagym
- Nationality: Thai
- Height: 1.73 m (5 ft 8 in)
- Weight: 67 kg (147.7 lb; 10.6 st)
- Division: Welterweight
- Style: Muay Thai
- Fighting out of: Bangkok, Thailand

Kickboxing record
- Total: 150
- Wins: 121
- By knockout: 58
- Losses: 25
- Draws: 4
- Last updated on: September 19, 2012

Big Ben Chor Praram 6 (Thai: บิ๊กเบน ช.พระราม 6) is a Thai Muay Thai kickboxer. He is the former Rajadamnern Stadium, WMC and W.B.C. Muaythai Champion.

== Biography and career ==
Big Ben Chor Praram 6 (บิ๊กเบน ช.พระราม 6) is one of the most famous Thai fighters, known for his rough fighting style and his punching power, winning many victories by KO. He has beat big names of muaythai such as Lamsongkram Chuwattana, Jean-Charles Skarbowsky, Noppadeth, Abdallah Mabel. He is a form WMC, WBC Muaythai world champion and Rajadamnern Stadium champion.

== Titles and achievements ==
- 2012 WMAF World Super Lightweight Champion
- 2008 W.B.C. Muaythai World Welterweight Champion (147 lbs)
- 2006 WMC World Junior Middleweight Champion (154 lbs)
- 2006 Rajadamnern Stadium Light Middleweight Champion (154 lbs)
- 2003 Thailand Welterweight Champion (147 lbs)
- 2008 Rajadamnern Stadium Welterweight Champion (147 lbs)

== Muaythai record ==
Muaythai record
121 Wins (58 (T)KO's), 25 Losses, 4 Draws
Date	Result	Opponent	Event	Location	Method	Round	Time
2012-06-09	Loss	(France) Fabio Pinca	WBC Battle of the belts	Bangkok, Thailand	Decision	5	3:00
Loses his WBC Muaythai World Welterweight title (147 lbs).
2012-03-18	Win	(Japan) Kazuki	Break 24 Sagittarius	Tokyo, Japan	Decision (3-0)	5	3:00
Wins WMAF World Super Lightweight title.
2011-11-04	Win	(Thailand) Lomisan Sor. Chokkitchai	WBC Muaythai Gala	Bangkok, Thailand	KO	1	
Retains WBC Muaythai World Welterweight title (147 lbs).
2010-12-18	Loss	(China) Ji Haitong	Bruce Lee 70th Birthday Celebrations	Shun De, China	Decision	5	3:00
2010-11-04	Loss	(Thailand) Sudsakorn Sor Klinmee	Fairtex Theprasit Boxing Stadium	Pattaya, Thailand	KO	2	
2010-07-12	Loss	(Belgium) Youssef Boughanem	Fairtex Theprasit Boxing Stadium	Pattaya, Thailand	Decision	5	3:00
2010-04-22	Loss	(Thailand) Omsinlek Sitjekarn	Jarumuang Fight, Rajadamnern Stadium	Bangkok, Thailand	TKO	3	
2009-12-19	Win	(China) Dong Wenfei	Chinese Kung Fu vs Muaythai Competition at Lingnan Pearl Stadium	Foshan, China	Decision (Unanimous)	5	3:00
2009-11-28	Win	(France) Abdallah Mabel	A-1 World Cup Combat Lyon	Lyon, France	KO (Elbow)	1	
Retains WBC Muaythai World Welterweight title (147 lbs).
2009-09-21	Win	(Thailand) Singyok Sor. Sisan	Daorungchujaroen Fight, Rajadamnern Stadium	Bangkok, Thailand	Decision (Unanimous)	5	3:00
Retains WBC Muaythai World Welterweight title (147 lbs).
2009-03-26	Loss	(France) Yohan Lidon	Les stars du Ring	Levallois, France	KO	1	
2009-01-19	Loss	(Thailand) Singmanee Kaewsamrit	Daorungchujaroen Fights, Rajadamnern Stadium	Bangkok, Thailand	Decision	5	3:00
2008-09-22	Loss	(Thailand) Khem Fairtex	Daorungchujarern Fights, Rajadamnern Stadium	Bangkok, Thailand	Decision (Unanimous)	5	3:00
2008-08-04	Win	(Thailand) Noppadeth 2 Chuwatthana	Daorungchujarern Fights, Rajadamnern Stadium	Bangkok, Thailand	Decision (Unanimous)	5	3:00
Wins WBC Muaythai World Welterweight title (147 lbs).
2008-05	Loss	(Thailand) Diesellek Lekrungruangyon	Rajadamnern Stadium	Bangkok, Thailand	Decision	5	3:00
Lost the Rajadamnern Stadium 154 lbs Title
2008-03-26	Win	(Thailand) Katapetch Petchphothong	Bangrachan, Rajadamnern Stadium	Bangkok, Thailand	Decision	5	3:00
2008-02-25	Loss	(Thailand) Diesellek Lekrungruangyon	Jarumueng, Rajadamnern Stadium	Bangkok, Thailand	Decision	5	3:00
2008-02-04	Win	(Thailand) Singsiri Por.Sirichai	Chucharoen, Rajadamnern Stadium	Bangkok, Thailand	KO	2	
2007-12-30	Loss	(Thailand) Diesellek Lekrungruangyon	Chucharoen + True Visions 62, Rajadamnern Stadium	Bangkok, Thailand	Decision	5	3:00
2007-10-28	Loss	(Japan) Hiroki Shishido	Shoot Boxing Battle Summit "Ground Zero"	Tokyo, Japan	Decision (Unanimous)	3	3:00
2007-07-26	Win	(Japan) Uan Phoenix Gym	Deep : Glove	Tokyo, Japan	Decision (Majority)	3	3:00
2007-03-29	Win	(Thailand) Karuhas Eakchumpon	Jarumueng Fights, Rajadamnern Stadium	Bangkok, Thailand	Decision	5	3:00
2007-02-25	Win	(Japan) Kenichi Ogata	Shoot Boxing 2007 Mu-So 1st	Bunkyo, Tokyo, Japan	KO (Right Hook)	2	1:04
2006-10-16	Loss	(Thailand) Naruepol Fairtex	Daowrungchujarern Fights, Rajadamnern Stadium	Bangkok, Thailand	Decision (Unanimous)	5	3:00
2006-06-29	Win	(France) Jean-Charles Skarbowsky	Jarumueang Fights, Rajadamnern Stadium	Bangkok, Thailand	TKO (Ref stop/elbow strike)	1	2:45
2005-04-09	Loss	(Netherlands) Fikri Tijarti	Muay Thai Champions League 14	Amsterdam, Netherlands	TKO (Doctor stoppage)		
For the WPKL World -67kg title
2005-01-06	Loss	(Thailand) Mawin Nakontongparkview	Daorungchujarean Fights, Rajadamnern Stadium	Bangkok, Thailand	TKO	3	
2004-12-13	Win	(Thailand) Thaveesub Sitsengaroon	Daorungchujarean Fights, Rajadamnern Stadium	Bangkok, Thailand	Decision (Unanimous)	5	3:00
2004-10-27	Win	(Thailand) Rodtung V.Taveekiat	Daorungchujarean Fights, Rajadamnern Stadium	Bangkok, Thailand	Decision (Unanimous)	5	3:00
2004-07-28	Win	(Thailand) Rodtung V.Taveekiat	Daorungchujarean Fights, Rajadamnern Stadium	Bangkok, Thailand	Decision (Unanimous)	5	3:00
2004-05-31	Win	(Thailand) Charnvit Kiat T.B.Ubon	Daorungchujarean Fights, Rajadamnern Stadium	Bangkok, Thailand	TKO	3	
2004-02-23	Win	(Thailand) Berneung Topkingboxing	Daorungchujarean + Jarumueang Fights, Rajadamnern Stadium	Bangkok, Thailand	Decision (Unanimous)	5	3:00
2004-01-01	Loss	(Thailand) Oomsin Sitkuanaim	SUK Daorungchujarean+Charumueang, Rajadamnern Stadium	Bangkok, Thailand	TKO	1	
2003-12-11	Draw	(Thailand) Berneung Topkingboxing	SUK Daorungchujarean, Rajadamnern Stadium	Bangkok, Thailand	Decision draw	5	3:00
2003-11-03	Win	(Thailand) Jakkawanlak Saktewan	Daorungchujarean+Charumueang, Rajadamnern Stadium	Bangkok, Thailand	TKO	3	
2003-09-29	Win	(Thailand) Sayan Chuwattana	SUK Daorungchujarean, Rajadamnern Stadium	Bangkok, Thailand	Decision (Unanimous)	5	3:00
Defended his Thailand Welterweight title (147 lbs).
2003-08-27	Loss	(Thailand) Berneung Topkingboxing	SUK Daorungchujarean, Rajadamnern Stadium	Bangkok, Thailand	Decision (Unanimous)	5	3:00
2003-07-21	Loss	(Thailand) Yokkao Bauchaurau2	Suk Daorungchujarearn & Jarumueang, Rajadamnern Stadium	Bangkok, Thailand	Decision (Unanimous)	5	3:00
2003-01-27	Win	(Thailand) Fuji Chalmsak	Rajadamnern Stadium	Bangkok, Thailand	Decision (Unanimous)	5	3:00
Wins Thailand Welterweight title (147 lbs).
2002-11-11	Win	(Thailand) Lamsongkram Chuwattana	Rajadamnern Stadium	Bangkok, Thailand	TKO	2	
2002-03-24	Loss	(Japan) Kozo Takeda	Korakuen Hall	Tokyo, Japan	KO (Lowkicks)	3	
Legend: Win Loss Draw/No contest Notes

== See also ==
- List of male kickboxers
