= Men's K-1 at WAKO World Championships 2007 Belgrade -63.5 kg =

Kickboxing tournament

The men's light welterweight (63.5 kg/139.7 lbs) K-1 category at the W.A.K.O. World Championships 2007 in Belgrade was the fourth lightest of the K-1 tournaments, involving twelve fighters from four continents (Europe, Asia, Africa and North America). Each of the matches was three rounds of two minutes each and were fought under K-1 rules.

As there were too few fighters for a sixteen-man tournament, four of the competitors had byes through to the quarter-finals. The tournament gold medallist was the highly decorated Belarusian Andrei Kulebin who won his third W.A.K.O. world championships by defeating Russian Kurbanali Akaev in the final. Defeated semi finalists, Jose Luis Uribe Garcia from Mexico and Serbian Sreten Miletic, won bronze medals.

== Results ==
1st round
(Russia) Kurbanali Akaev	WIN
(Portugal) Tiago Rocha
(Croatia) Matija Medimurec
(Kyrgyzstan) Aibek Duishembiev	WIN
(Poland) Lukasz Plawecki
(Belarus) Andrei Kulebin	WIN
(Azerbaijan) Emin Suleymanov
(Serbia) Sreten Miletic	WIN

Quarter-finals
(Morocco) Badr Halowi
(Russia) Kurbanali Akaev	WIN
(Mexico) Jose Luis Uribe Garcia	WIN
(Kyrgyzstan) Aibek Duishembiev
(Italy) Federico Pacini
(Belarus) Andrei Kulebin	WIN
(Bosnia and Herzegovina) Sinisa Gambeljic
(Serbia) Sreten Miletic	WIN

Semi-finals
(Russia) Kurbanali Akaev	WIN
(Mexico) Jose Luis Uribe Garcia
(Serbia) Sreten Miletic
(Belarus) Andrei Kulebin	WIN

Final
(Russia) Kurbanali Akaev
(Belarus) Andrei Kulebin	WIN

== See also ==
- List of WAKO Amateur World Championships
- List of WAKO Amateur European Championships
- List of male kickboxers
