= Kana Morimoto =

Japanese kickboxer

- Born: 森本佳奈; 29 July 1992 (age 34); Matsusaka, Mie, Japan
- Other names: KANA, カナ
- Height: 1.60 m (5 ft 3 in)
- Weight: 52 kg (115 lb; 8 st 3 lb)
- Division: Flyweight
- Style: Kickboxing
- Fighting out of: Setagaya, Tokyo, Japan
- Team: Team Aftermath (2024-Present); K-1 Gym Sangenjaya Silver Wolf
- Years active: 2015-present

Kickboxing record
- Total: 32
- Wins: 25
- By knockout: 11
- Losses: 7
- By knockout: 0

Other information
- University: Kokushikan University
- Website: https://kana-kick.com/profile/
- Last updated on: 3 November 2020

Kana Morimoto (森本佳奈, born 29 July 1992), popularly known as KANA, is a Japanese kickboxer competing with ONE Championship. A professional competitor since 2015, she is the 2019 K-1 Women's Flyweight Grand Prix winner, a two-time Krush Women's Flyweight champion and one-time K-1 Women's Flyweight champion.

She is the #9 ranked female kickboxer in the world by Combat Press, as of November 2020, and has been ranked in the top ten since June 2018.

== Kickboxing career ==
=== Early career ===
Morimoto made her professional debut against a fellow debutante Koto Hiroaka at Krush 58 on 12 September 2015. She won the fight by a second-round knockout. The knockout was preceded by two knockdowns: the first was a standing knockdown in the first round, while the second resulted from an uppercut in the second round.

Morimoto was scheduled to face the #5 ranked J-Girls mini-flyweight Miyako Mitsuhori at Krush 60 on 14 November 2015. Mitsuhori was more experienced than Morimoto, with 20 professional bouts in her four year career. Morimoto won the fight by a first-round knockout.

Morimoto was scheduled to face the undefeated Jeong Hye Jin at Krush 63 on 5 February 2016. Morimoto scored the first knockdown of the fight in the first round, countering Jin's jab with a right hook and following up with punches. Although she wasn't able to knock her opponent out, Morimoto inflicted enough damage that the ringside doctor had to be called in three seconds into the second round, to check the cut above Jin's left eye. The doctor opted to stop the fight, awarding Morimoto the technical knockout.

=== Krush ===
==== First Krush title reign ====
Morimoto was scheduled to fight the former J-Girls mini-flyweight champion Momi for the vacant Krush Women's Flyweight title at Krush 65 on 10 April 2016. Morimoto won the fight by unanimous decision, with scores of 29–28, 29–28 and 29–27. Morimoto scored the only knockdown of the fight in the third round, dropping Momi with a head kick.

Morimoto made her first title defense against the one-time Krush title challenger Aki Gracyer at Krush 67 on 18 July 2016. She won the fight by majority decision. Two of the judges scored the fight 30–28 and 29–28 in her favor, while the third judge scored it 29–28 for Graycer.

Morimoto made her second title defense against Kai Ting Chuang at Krush 69 on 30 September 2016. She won the fight by a third-round knockout, landing a head kick with 31 seconds left in the bout.

Morimoto was scheduled to make her third title defense against Mellony Geugjes at Krush 72 on 15 January 2017. Geugjes won the fight by unanimous decision, with scores of 28–26, 27–26 and 28–26. Morimoto suffered two knockdowns in the bout: she was knocked down with a left jab in the first round and with a right straight in the third round. It was the first loss of Morimoto's professional career.

==== Spicer and Machut bouts ====
Morimoto was scheduled to face the former WBC Muaythai International Super Flyweight champion Grace Spicer at Krush 76 on 28 May 2017. She won the fight by a wide unanimous decision, with scores of 30–26, 30–26 and 30–25.

Morimoto was scheduled to face the incumbent ISKA World Atomweight Full Contact champion Emilie Machut at Krush 79 on 20 August 2017. She won the fight by a first-round knockout, dropping Machut with a right hook with 5 seconds left in the round. During her post-fight interview, Morimoto called for a rematch with Mellony Geugjes.

==== Second Krush title reign ====
Morimoto was scheduled to rematch Mellony Geugjes for the Krush Women's Flyweight title at Krush 83 on 9 December 2017. She won the closely contested bout by unanimous decision, with scores of 30–29, 29–28 and 30–28.

Morimoto made her K-1 debut against Polina Petukhova at K-1 World GP 2019: K’FESTA 2 on 21 March 2018. In preparation for the bout, Morimoto trained with the reigning WBA and WBO world champion Naoko Fujioka. She won the fight by a dominant unanimous decision, with all three judges scoring the 30–26 in her favor. Morimoto scored the sole knockdown of the fight at the very end of the second round, dropping Petukhova with a head kick.

Morimoto was scheduled to make the first title defense of her second title reign against Kim Townsend at Krush 88 on 17 May 2018. The fight was ruled a draw after the first three rounds were contested, with two of the judges scoring the fight as an even 28–28 draw and the third judge scoring the fight 29–28 for Townsend. Morimoto was awarded the unanimous decision, after an extra round was fought.

Morimoto was scheduled to make her second title defense against Liu Shibei in the main event of Krush 92 on 18 August 2018. She won the fight by a second-round knockout, stopping Shibei with a liver kick midway through the round.

=== K-1 ===
Morimoto was scheduled to face the two-time IFMA World medalist Josefine Lindgren Knutsson at K-1 World GP 2018: 3rd Super Lightweight Championship Tournament on 3 November 2018. She won the fight by unanimous decision, with scores of 29–27, 29–27 and 30–28. During the post-fight press conference, Morimoto revealed that she had suffered a bicep tear, in her right arm, during the second round.

Morimoto and Knutsson were scheduled to rematch at K'Festa 2 on 10 March 2019. Knutsson was more successful in the rematch, winning the fight by majority decision, with scores of 30–28, 30–29 and 29–29.

Morimoto was scheduled to face Mahiro K-1 World GP 2019: Japan vs World 5 vs 5 & Special Superfight in Osaka on 24 August 2019. She won the fight by unanimous decision, with scores of 30–27, 30–27 and 30–28.

==== 2019 K-1 Women's Flyweight Tournament ====
Morimoto was scheduled to participate in the 2019 K-1 Women's Flyweight Championship Tournament, held to crown the inaugural women's flyweight champion, on 28 December 2019. She was scheduled to face the reigning ISKA atomweight and Enfusion 52 kg champion Cristina Morales in the tournament semifinals. Morimoto won the fight by a unanimous decision, with scores of 29–27, 30–27 and 29–27. She scored the sole knockdown of the fight in the third round, dropping Morales with a short right hook.

Morimoto fought a rubber match with Josefine Lindgren Knutsson in the tournament finals. Each held a decision win over the other entering the bout, although Morimoto was regarded as the favorite. The fight was ruled a majority draw following the first three rounds, with one of the judges scoring the bout 29–28 for Morimoto. Morimoto was awarded a split decision after an extra round was fought.

==== K-1 Women's Flyweight champion ====
Morimoto was scheduled to face Gloria Peritore in a non-title bout at K'Festa 3 on 22 March 2020. She won the fight by a first-round knockout, landing a right hook with 18 seconds left in the round.

Morimoto was scheduled to face Kotomi at K-1 World GP 2020 in Fukuoka on 3 November 2020. Despite coming into the fight as a favorite, Morimoto lost the fight by unanimous decision, with scores of 28–29, 29–30 and 29–30.

Morimoto was scheduled to make the first defense of her K-1 Women's Flyweight Championship at K-1 World GP 2022 Japan on 27 February 2022, in an immediate rematch with the Krush Women's Flyweight champion Kotomi. Kotomi later withdrew from the bout and was replaced by Ran, who faced Morimoto in a non-title bout. She won the fight by unanimous decision.

Morimoto faced Souris Manfredi in a non-title bout at K-1: Ring of Venus on 25 June 2022. Morimoto knocked Manfredi down twice in the first round, before winning the fight by a third-round knockout, stopping Manfredi with a head kick at the 2:26 minute mark of the last round.

Morimoto faced the former Enfusion and WAKO champion Aurore Dos Santos in a non-title bout at K-1 World GP 2022 in Osaka on December 3, 2022. She won the fight by first-round technical knockout, as she stopped Dos Santos with a flurry of punches with just five seconds left in the opening frame.

Morimoto made her second K-1 Women's Flyweight title defense against the one-time FEA and WAKO world champion Funda Alkayış at K-1 World GP 2023: K'Festa 6 on March 12, 2023. She won the fight by a second-round technical knockout.

On May 25, 2023, K-1 announced that Morimoto would make her third flyweight championship defense against Amy Pirnie at K-1 World GP 2023 on July 17, 2023. That same day, Pirnie released a statement on her Instagram profile claiming that she was still in negotiations with the promotion at the time the bout was announced and would be withdrawing from them due to the perceived bad treatment. Morimoto was rescheduled to face McKenna Wade at the same event. She won the fight by a first-round knockout, 58 seconds into the opening round.

Morimoto was scheduled to make the fourth defense of her K-1 Women's Flyweight (-52kg) Championship at K-1 ReBIRTH 2 on December 9, 2023, against WKU world champion Antonia Prifti. She lost the fight by unanimous decision, with all three judges scoring the contest 30–29 for Prifti.

=== ONE Championship ===
Morimoto signed with ONE Championship on September 6, 2024.

Morimoto faced Moa Carlsson on January 31, 2025, at ONE Friday Fights 95. She won the fight via unanimous decision.

Morimoto faced Phetjeeja Lukjaoporongtom for the ONE Women's Atomweight Kickboxing World Championship on March 23, 2025, at ONE 172. She lost the bout via unanimous decision.

Morimoto will face the former ONE Atomweight Muay Thai World champion and ONE Atomweight Kickboxing World champion Stamp Fairtex at ONE 173 on November 16, 2025.

== Championships and accomplishments ==
=== Amateur ===
- K-1
  - 2014 K-1 Challenge Women's B Class -50 kg Tournament Winner
  - 2015 K-1 Challenge Women's B Class -50 kg Tournament Winner

=== Professional ===
- K-1
  - 2019 K-1 Women's Flyweight World Grand Prix Winner
  - K-1 Women's Flyweight Championship (One time, former)
    - Three successful title defenses
    - Tied for second most consecutive title defenses
- Krush
  - Krush Women's Flyweight Championship (Two times, former)
    - Four successful title defenses (across two reigns)
    - Tied for second most wins in Krush title fights (6)

=== Awards ===
- Beyond Kickboxing
  - 2022 Beyond Kick "Female Fighter of the Year"

== Kickboxing record ==
Kickboxing record
25 Wins (11 (T)KOs), 7 Losses
Date	Result	Opponent	Event	Location	Method	Round	Time	Record
2026-12-19		(United States) Selina Flores	ONE Fight Night 50	Bangkok, Thailand				
2026-08-15	Win	(Hong Kong) Yu Yau Pui	ONE Fight Night 46	Bangkok, Thailand	Decision (Unanimous)	3	3:00	25–7
2026-05-22	Loss	(Myanmar) Vero Nika	ONE Friday Fights 155, Lumpinee Stadium	Bangkok, Thailand	Decision (Unanimous)	3	3:00	24–7
2025-11-16	Win	(Thailand) Stamp Fairtex	ONE 173	Tokyo, Japan	Decision (Unanimous)	3	3:00	24–6
2025-03-23	Loss	(Thailand) Phetjeeja Lukjaoporongtom	ONE 172	Saitama, Japan	Decision (Unanimous)	5	3:00	23–6
For the ONE Women's Atomweight Kickboxing World Championship.
2025-01-31	Win	(Sweden) Moa Carlsson	ONE Friday Fights 95, Lumpinee Stadium	Bangkok, Thailand	Decision (Unanimous)	3	3:00	23–5
2024-12-07	Loss	(Algeria) Anissa Meksen	ONE Friday Fights 92, Lumpinee Stadium	Bangkok, Thailand	Decision (Unanimous)	3	3:00	22–5
2023-12-09	Loss	(Greece) Antonia Prifti	K-1 ReBIRTH 2	Osaka, Japan	Decision (Unanimous)	3	3:00	22–4
Loses the K-1 Women's Flyweight Championship.
2023-07-17	Win	(England) McKenna Wade	K-1 World GP 2023	Tokyo, Japan	KO (Body kick)	1	0:58	22–3
Defends the K-1 Women's Flyweight Championship.
2023-03-12	Win	(Turkey) Funda Alkayış	K-1 World GP 2023: K'Festa 6	Tokyo, Japan	TKO (retirement/low kicks)	2	1:31	21–3
Defends the K-1 Women's Flyweight Championship.
2022-12-03	Win	(France) Aurore Dos Santos	K-1 World GP 2022 in Osaka	Osaka, Japan	TKO (Punches)	1	2:55	20–3
2022-06-25	Win	(France) Souris Manfredi	K-1: Ring of Venus	Tokyo, Japan	KO (High kick)	3	1:28	19–3
Defends the K-1 Women's Flyweight Championship.
2022-02-27	Win	(Japan) Ran	K-1 World GP 2022 Japan	Tokyo, Japan	Decision (Unanimous)	3	3:00	18–3
2020-11-03	Loss	(Japan) Kotomi	K-1 World GP 2020 in Fukuoka	Fukuoka, Japan	Decision (Unanimous)	3	3:00	17–3
2020-03-22	Win	(Italy) Gloria Peritore	K'Festa 3	Tokyo, Japan	KO (Right hook)	1	2:42	17–2
2019-12-28	Win	(Sweden) Josefine Lindgren Knutsson	K-1 World GP 2019 Japan: ～Women's Flyweight Championship Tournament～	Nagoya, Japan	Ext. R. Decision (Split)	4	3:00	16–2
Won the K-1 Women's Flyweight Championship.
2019-12-28	Win	(Spain) Cristina Morales	K-1 World GP 2019 Japan: ～Women's Flyweight Championship Tournament～	Nagoya, Japan	Decision (Unanimous)	3	3:00	15–2
2019-08-24	Win	(Japan) Mahiro	K-1 World GP 2019: Japan vs World 5 vs 5 & Special Superfight in Osaka	Osaka, Japan	Decision (Unanimous)	3	3:00	14–2
2019-03-10	Loss	(Sweden) Josefine Lindgren Knutsson	K'Festa 2	Tokyo, Japan	Decision (Majority)	3	3:00	13–2
2018-11-03	Win	(Sweden) Josefine Lindgren Knutsson	K-1 World GP 2018: 3rd Super Lightweight Championship Tournament	Saitama, Japan	Decision (Unanimous)	3	3:00	13–1
2018-08-18	Win	(China) Liu Shibei	Krush 92	Nagoya, Japan	KO (Liver kick)	2	1:38	12–1
Defends the Krush Women's Flyweight title.
2018-05-17	Win	(Australia) Kim Townsend	Krush 88	Tokyo, Japan	Ext. R. Decision (Unanimous)	4	3:00	11–1
Defends the Krush Women's Flyweight title.
2018-03-21	Win	(Poland) Polina Petukhova	K-1 World GP 2018: K'FESTA.1	Saitama, Japan	Decision (Unanimous)	3	3:00	10–1
2017-12-09	Win	(Netherlands) Mellony Geugjes	Krush 83	Tokyo, Japan	Decision (Unanimous)	3	3:00	9–1
Wins the Krush Women's Flyweight title.
2017-08-20	Win	(France) Emilie Machut	Krush 79	Tokyo, Japan	KO (Right hook)	1	2:55	8–1
2017-05-28	Win	(England) Grace Spicer	Krush 76	Tokyo, Japan	Decision (Unanimous)	3	3:00	7–1
2017-01-15	Loss	(Netherlands) Mellony Geugjes	Krush 72	Tokyo, Japan	Decision (Unanimous)	3	3:00	6–1
Loses the Krush Women's Flyweight title.
2016-09-30	Win	(Taiwan) Kill Bee	Krush 69	Tokyo, Japan	KO (Head kick)	3	2:29	6–0
Defends the Krush Women's Flyweight title.
2016-07-18	Win	(Japan) Aki Gracyer	Krush 67	Tokyo, Japan	Decision (Majority)	3	3:00	5–0
Defends the Krush Women's Flyweight title.
2016-04-10	Win	(Japan) Momi	Krush 65	Tokyo, Japan	Decision (Unanimous)	4	3:00	4–0
Wins the Krush Women's Flyweight title.
2016-02-05	Win	(South Korea) Jeong Hye Jin	Krush 63	Tokyo, Japan	TKO (Doctor stoppage)	2	0:03	3–0
2015-11-14	Win	(Japan) Miyako Mitsuhori	Krush 60	Tokyo, Japan	KO (Punch)	1	1:09	2–0
2015-09-12	Win	(Japan) Koto Hiraoka	Krush 58	Tokyo, Japan	KO (Right hook)	2	1:54	1–0
Legend: Win Loss Draw/No contest Notes

Amateur Kickboxing record
Date	Result	Opponent	Event	Location	Method	Round	Time
2015-04-26	Win	(Japan) Mari Suzuki	K-1 Amateur 5, B-Class Challenge Tournament Final	Tokyo, Japan	Decision	2	2:00
2015-02-15	Win	(Japan) Shizuka Kobayashi	K-1 Amateur 4, Final	Tokyo, Japan	Decision		
2015-02-15	Win	(Japan) Reiko Asai	K-1 Amateur 4, Semi Final	Tokyo, Japan	Decision		
Legend: Win Loss Draw/No contest Notes

== See also ==
- List of female kickboxers
- List of K-1 champions
- List of Krush champions
