= Josefine Lindgren Knutsson =

Swedish kickboxer

- Born: 16 January 1996 (age 30); Stockholm, Sweden
- Nickname: Little Thunder
- Height: 5 ft 3 in (1.60 m)
- Weight: 125 lb (57 kg; 8 st 13 lb)
- Division: Flyweight (Kickboxing); Strawweight (MMA)
- Reach: 61 in (155 cm)
- Style: Muay Thai, Kickboxing
- Stance: Orthodox
- Fighting out of: Stockholm, Sweden
- Team: Allstars Training Centre
- Trainer: Sanja Trbojevic

Kickboxing record
- Total: 32
- Wins: 27
- By knockout: 9
- Losses: 5

Mixed martial arts record
- Total: 11
- Wins: 9
- By knockout: 1
- By decision: 8
- Losses: 2
- By submission: 1
- By decision: 1

Amateur record
- Total: 1
- Wins: 1

Other information
- Mixed martial arts record from Sherdog

Josefine Lindgren Knutsson (born 16 January 1996) is a Swedish mixed martial artist who competed in the Strawweight division of the Ultimate Fighting Championship (UFC). She is also a former kickboxer and was a K-1 flyweight (-52 kg) Grand Prix finalist in 2019.

== Kickboxing career ==
Knutsson faced the ISKA and future Enfusion strawweight champion Amy Pirnie at Yokkao 27 on 15 October 2017. Pirnie won the fight by unanimous decision.

Knutsson participated in the 2017 IFMA Youth World Championship and won a bronze medal in the -51 kg event. Knutsson took part in the 2018 IFMA World Muaythai Championships as well, albeit in the -54 kg event. She won all four fights of the tournament, most notably against Janet Todd, and captured the gold medal.

Knutsson faced the Krush Women's flyweight champion Kana Morimoto at K-1 World GP 2018: 3rd Super Lightweight Championship Tournament on 3 November 2018. She lost the fight unanimous decision. The pair fought an immediate rematch at K'Festa 2 on 10 March 2019. She won the fight by majority decision.

Knutsson faced Kotomi at Krush 104 on 31 August 2019. She won the fight by unanimous decision.

Knutsson participated in the 2019 Flyweight Grand Prix, held at 2019 K-1 Women's Flyweight Championship Tournament on 28 December 2019. In the semi-finals she won a unanimous decision against Mellony Geugjes, but in turn lost a unanimous decision in a trilogy fight with Kana Morimoto.

Combat Press ranked her as a top ten pound for pound female kickboxer between November 2020 and January 2022, peaking at #5.

== Mixed martial arts career ==
=== Early career ===
==== Fight Club Rush ====
Knutsson had one single amateur fight before she made her professional debut. She fought Nina Back at Brave CF 37 and won the fight by unanimous decision.

Knutsson was scheduled to make her professional mixed martial arts debut against Fabiola Pidroni at Fight Club Rush 8 on 6 March 2021. The bout was later cancelled, as Pidroni was arrested on drug charges. Adriana Fusini took the fight as a short notice replacement. Knutsson ended up winning her professional debut by unanimous decision.

Knutsson was scheduled to face Elizabeth Rodrigues at Fight Club Rush 9 on 4 September 2021. She won the fight by a second-round technical knockout.

Knutsson was scheduled to face Lanchana Green at Fight Club Rush 10 on 20 November 2021. She won the fight by unanimous decision.

==== Road to UFC ====
Knutsson faced Ye Dam Seo on Episode 3 of Road to UFC Season 1 on 10 June 2022. She won the bout via unanimous decision.

Knutsson faced Jacinta Austin at UAE Warriors 36 on 25 February 2023. She won the fight by a closely contested bout by split decision.

Knutsson faced Isis Verbeek at Dana White's Contender Series on 22 August 2023. She won the fight by unanimous decision.

=== Ultimate Fighting Championship ===
Knutsson was expected to make her UFC debut against Iasmin Lucindo at UFC Fight Night: Grasso vs. Shevchenko 2 on 16 September 2023. However, Lucindo was pulled from the fight for unknown reasons and was replaced by Marnic Mann. Knutsson won the fight via unanimous decision.

Knutsson was scheduled to face Julia Polastri on 2 March 2024, at UFC Fight Night 238. However, Knutsson pulled out due to injury. The bout was later rescheduled to take place on 15 June 2024 at UFC on ESPN 58. Knutsson won the fight by unanimous decision.

Knutsson faced Piera Rodríguez on 14 December 2024 at UFC on ESPN 63. She lost the fight by unanimous decision.

=== Global Fight League ===
On 24 January 2025, it was announced that Knutsson had parted ways with the UFC and signed with the Global Fight League.

Knutsson was scheduled to face Miao Ding on 25 May 2025 at GFL 2. However, all GFL events were cancelled indefinitely.

== Championships and accomplishments ==
=== Kickboxing ===
- Battle of Lund
  - 2015 BoL Flyweight Champion (One title defense)
- K-1
  - 2019 K-1 Flyweight World Grand Prix Runner-up

=== Muay thai ===
- Svenska Muaythaiförbundet
  - 2017 SM National Championships -51 kg (gold)
- International Federation of Muaythai Associations
  - 2017 IFMA World Championships -54 kg (bronze)
  - 2018 IFMA World Championships -51 kg (gold)

== Mixed martial arts record ==
Professional record breakdown
11 matches	9 wins	2 losses
By knockout	1	0
By submission	0	1
By decision	8	1

Res.	Record	Opponent	Method	Event	Date	Round	Time	Location	Notes
Win	9–2	Yasmin Guimarães	Decision (unanimous)	Oktagon 97	7 November 2026	3	5:00	Hanover, Germany	Catchweight (122.8 lb) bout; Guimarães missed weight.
Loss	8–2	Mileide Simplicio	Submission (rear-naked choke)	Oktagon 87	25 April 2026	1	4:55	Liberec, Czech Republic	
Loss	8–1	Piera Rodríguez	Decision (unanimous)	UFC on ESPN: Covington vs. Buckley	14 December 2024	3	5:00	Tampa, Florida, United States	
Win	8–0	Julia Polastri	Decision (unanimous)	UFC on ESPN: Perez vs. Taira	15 June 2024	3	5:00	Las Vegas, Nevada, United States	
Win	7–0	Marnic Mann	Decision (unanimous)	UFC Fight Night: Grasso vs. Shevchenko 2	16 September 2023	3	5:00	Las Vegas, Nevada, United States	
Win	6–0	Isis Verbeek	Decision (unanimous)	Dana White's Contender Series 59	22 August 2023	3	5:00	Las Vegas, Nevada, United States	
Win	5–0	Jacinta Austin	Decision (split)	UAE Warriors 36	25 February 2023	3	5:00	Abu Dhabi, United Arab Emirates	
Win	4–0	Seo Ye-dam	Decision (unanimous)	Road to UFC Season 1: Episode 3	10 June 2022	3	5:00	Kallang, Singapore	
Win	3–0	Lanchana Green	Decision (unanimous)	Fight Club Rush 10	20 November 2021	3	5:00	Västerås, Sweden	
Win	2–0	Elizabeth Rodrigues	TKO (knee to the body and punches)	Fight Club Rush 9	4 September 2021	2	0:47	Västerås, Sweden	
Win	1–0	Adriana Fusini	Decision (unanimous)	Fight Club Rush 8	6 March 2021	3	5:00	Västerås, Sweden	Strawweight debut

Amateur record breakdown		
1 match	1 win	0 losses
By decision	1	0

Res.	Record	Opponent	Method	Event	Date	Round	Time	Location	Notes
Win	1–0	Nina Back	Decision (unanimous)	Brave CF 37	1 August 2020	3	5:00	Stockholm, Sweden	

== Kickboxing and Muay Thai record ==
Professional Muay Thai and Kickboxing record
27 Wins (9 KOs), 5 Losses. 0 Draws
Date	Result	Opponent	Event	Location	Method	Round	Time
2019-12-28	Loss	(Japan) Kana Morimoto	K-1 World GP 2019 Japan: ～Women's Flyweight Championship Tournament～ Final	Nagoya, Japan	Ext.R Decision (Split)	4	3:00
For the inaugural K-1 Women's Flyweight Championship.
2019-12-28	Win	(Netherlands) Mellony Geugjes	K-1 World GP 2019 Japan: ～Women's Flyweight Championship Tournament～ Semifinals	Nagoya, Japan	Decision (Unanimous)	3	3:00
2019-11-09	Win	(Scotland) Rhona Walker	Fight Sport Extreme	Glasgow, Scotland	Decision (Split)	5	3:00
2019-08-31	Win	(Japan) Kotomi	Krush 104	Tokyo, Japan	Decision (Unanimous)	3	3:00
2019-03-10	Win	(Japan) Kana Morimoto	K-1 World GP 2019: K'FESTA 2	Saitama, Japan	Decision (Majority)	3	3:00
2018-12-06	NC	(Thailand) Lommanee Wor.Santai	King's Cup - International Muay Kastsart University	Bangkok, Thailand	lighting malfunction	4	
2018-11-03	Loss	(Japan) Kana Morimoto	K1 WGP 2018	Saitama, Japan	Decision (Unanimous)	3	3:00
2017-12-15	Win	(Poland) Monika Porażyńska-Bohn	Ladies Fight Night 7: Double Trouble 1	Łódź, Poland	TKO (Retirement)	3	2:57
2017-10-15	Loss	(Scotland) Amy Pirnie	Yokkao 27&28	Saitama, Japan	Decision (Unanimous)	3	3:00
2016-11-12	Win	(Norway) Anne Line Hogstad	Battle of Lund 8	Lund, Sweden	Decision (Unanimous)	5	2:00
Defends the Battle of Lund Flyweight Championship.
2016-10-22	Loss	(England) Christi Brereton	Roar Combat League 4	Watford, England	Decision (Unanimous)	5	3:00
For the RCL Super Bantamweight Championship.
2016-05-24	Win	(Thailand)	Chaweng Stadium	Koh Samui, Thailand	TKO	3	
2016-04-30	Win	(Sweden) Claudia Sendlak	Gladiatorspelen 8	Skövde, Sweden	Decision	3	3:00
2015-11-14	Win	(Sweden) Therese Gunnarsson	Battle of Lund 7	Lund, Sweden	Decision (Unanimous)	5	3:00
Wins the Battle of Lund Flyweight Championship.
Legend: Win Loss Draw/No contest Notes

Amateur Muay Thai record
Date	Result	Opponent	Event	Location	Method	Round	Time
2018-05-19	Win	(Vietnam) Buy Yen Ly	2018 IFMA World Championships, Final	Cancun, Mexico	Decision (29:28)	3	2:00
Wins 2018 IFMA World Championships -51kg Gold Medal.
2018-05-18	Win	(France) Juliette Lacroix	2018 IFMA World Championships, Semi-finals	Cancun, Mexico	Decision (30:27)	3	2:00
2018-05-15	Win	(United States) Janet Todd	2018 IFMA World Championships, Quarter-finals	Cancun, Mexico	Decision (30:27)	3	2:00
2018-05-13	Win	(Russia) Ekaterina Gurina	2018 IFMA World Championships, Round of 16	Cancun, Mexico	Decision (30:27)	3	2:00
2017-05-08	Loss	(Russia) Valeriya Drozdova	2017 IFMA World Championships, Semi-finals	Minsk, Belarus	TKO	3	
Wins 2017 IFMA World Championships -54kg Bronze Medal.
2017-05-07	Win	(China) Xu Yin	2017 IFMA World Championships, Quarter-finals	Minsk, Belarus	Decision (30:27)	3	2:00
2017-05-05	Win	(Tajikistan) Madina Gaforova	2017 IFMA World Championships, Round of 16	Minsk, Belarus	TKO	1	
2017-02-25	Win	(Sweden) Therese Gunnarsson	2017 Swedish Muay Thai Championship, Final	Haninge, Sweden	Decision (Unanimous)	3	2:00
Wins 2017 Swedish Muay Thai Championship -51kg Gold Medal.
2017-02-24	Win	(Sweden) Jennifer Qvistberg	2017 Swedish Muay Thai Championship, Semifinal	Haninge, Sweden	KO	1	
Legend: Win Loss Draw/No contest Notes

== See more ==
- List of female mixed martial artists
- List of female kickboxers
