= Ludivine =

Ludivine is a feminine given name. Notable women with the given name include:

- Ludivine Dedonder, Belgian politician
- Ludivine Diguelman, French footballer
- Ludivine Furnon, French artistic gymnast
- Ludivine Henrion, Belgian road bicycle racer
- Ludivine Kreutz, French professional golfer
- Ludivine Lasnier (born 1985), French kickboxer
- Ludivine Sagnier, French actress
