= Silvia La Notte =

Italian kickboxer

- Born: 15 August 1982 (age 44); Milan, Italy
- Other names: "Little Devil"
- Nationality: Italian
- Height: 1.58 m (5 ft 2 in)
- Weight: 48 kg (106 lb; 7 st 8 lb)
- Division: Mini Flyweight; Flyweight; Super Flyweight
- Style: Kickboxing; Muay Thai; Savate
- Fighting out of: Milan, Italy
- Team: Thunder Gym
- Trainer: Giorgio Castoldi; Christian Brenna
- Years active: 2002 - present

Kickboxing record
- Total: 106
- Wins: 87
- Losses: 15
- Draws: 4
- No contests: 0

Other information
- Website: https://www.silvialanotte.com/
- Boxing record from BoxRec

Silvia La Notte (born 15 August 1982) is an Italian kickboxer and Nak Muay, who has been professionally competing since 2002. She is the reigning WAKO World K1 Super Flyweight champion.

She is the former ISKA World Muay Thai Atomweight champion and the former WKN European Champion, as well as the 2008 and 2009 J GIRLS World Queen Tournament winner. She is the FIS Savate 2003 and 2009 World Champion and the 2008 European Champion.

At an amateur level, she is the 2009 WAKO Bantamweight gold medalist. and the European Union Amateur Boxing Championships 2007 Bronze medalist at 48 kg.

== Martial arts career ==
Silvia La Notte made her martial arts debut in 2002. During the first part of her career she fought mainly in Europe, and notably won the European and World Savate championships.

In 2008 she participated in the 2008 J GIRLS World Queen Tournament. In the semi-finals, she defeated Shoko Ayashida. In the finals she won a split decision over Graycer Aki.

In March 2009 she fought Linda Ooms for the WAKO World K1 Super Flyweight title. La Notte won a unanimous decision.

La Notte entered the 2009 edition of the J GIRLS World Queen Tournament. She won decisions over Graycer Aki in the quarter-finals, Ho Seongbok in the semi-finals and Motoe Abe in the finals, to once again win the tournament.

She faced Maribel De Souza for the WKN European title. La Notte won a unanimous decision.

In her next fight, La Notte faced Ozge San, for her first WAKO title defense. La Notte won the fight by knockout.

After going 9-4 in her next thirteen fights, La Notte faced Ruqsana Begum for the ISKA World Muay Thai Atomweight Championship. La Notte won the fight by TKO.

La Notte went 12-3-1 in her next 17 fights, with a single no contest due to an accidental headbutt. She then faced Monika Chochlíková for her second WAKO title defense. La Notte won a unanimous decision.

Her third title defense came in 2018, against Ludivine Lasnier. La Notte won a unanimous decision.

In 2019 La Notte fought a rematch with Amy Pirnie for the Enfusion 50 kg title. Pirnie won a unanimous decision.

La Notte faced Luisa Burgos at MASL on October 16, 2021, in her first fight in two years. She won the fight by unanimous decision.

== Championships and accomplishments ==
=== Kickboxing and Muaythai ===
- World Association of Kickboxing Organizations
  - WAKO World K1 Amateur Atomweight Championship
  - WAKO World K1 Mini Flyweight championship
    - Three successful title defenses
- International Sport Karate Association
  - ISKA World Muay Thai Atomweight Championship
- J NETWORK
  - 2008 J GIRLS World Queen Tournament Winner
  - 2009 J GIRLS World Queen Tournament Winner
- World Kickboxing Network
  - WKN European Championship
- Federation Internationale de Savate
  - 2003 FIS Savate World Flyweight Championship
  - 2008 FIS Savate European Flyweight Championship
  - 2009 FIS Savate World Flyweight Championship

=== Boxing ===
- European Union Amateur Boxing Championships
  - 2007 Amateur Boxing Championship 48 kg Bronze Medalist

== Kickboxing record ==
Kickboxing record
87 wins, 15 losses, 4 draw
Date	Result	Opponent	Event	Location	Method	Round	Time
13 Nov 2021	Loss	(Finland) Tessa Kakkonen	Total Fight Night V	Lahti, Finland	Decision (Unanimous)	5	3:00
For the ISKA European Strawweight Muay Thai title.
16 Oct 2021	Win	(Spain) Luisa Burgos	MASL	Madrid, Spain	Decision (Unanimous)	3	3:00
12 Oct 2019	Loss	(France) Jade Jorand	Bellator 230	Milan, Italy	KO (High Kick)	2	
15 Jun 2019	Win	(France) Myriame Djedidi	La Nuit de l'Impact V	Saintes, France	Decision (Unanimous)	3	3:00
18 May 2019	Win	(Spain) Cristina Morales	Master Fight	Chalon-sur-Saône, France	Decision (Unanimous)	3	3:00
23 Mar 2019	Loss	(Scotland) Amy Pirnie	Enfusion 80	Rome, Italy	Decision (Unanimous)	5	3:00
For the Enfusion 50 kg title.
1 Dec 2018	Win	(France) Ludivine Lasnier	Night Of Si'Fight 1	Troyes, France	Decision (Unanimous)	5	3:00
Defendes the WAKO Super Flyweight title.
3 Nov 2018	Win	(Italy) Delizia Hurtado	Nitro	Carrara, Italy	Decision (Unanimous)	3	3:00
15 Apr 2018	Loss	(China) Guan Acui	Kunlun Fight 72	Beijing, China	Decision (Unanimous)	3	3:00
15 Dec 2017	Win	(Poland) Żaneta Cieśla	Ladies Fight Night 7: Double Trouble 1	Łódź, Poland	Decision (Unanimous)	3	3:00
4 Nov 2017	Win	(Switzerland) Ilenia Perugini	Spirit Boxing Show 2	Nogent-sur-Seine, France	Decision (Unanimous)	3	3:00
14 Aug 2017	Win	(Thailand) Aungkor Phettonpueng	Chiang Mai Stadium	Wat Ket, Thailand	Decision (Unanimous)	3	3:00
28 Jul 2017	Win	(Thailand) Payayang Tor. Theerasawad	Thaphae Boxing Stadium	Chiang Mai, Thailand	Decision (Unanimous)	3	3:00
13 May 2017	Win	(Slovakia) Monika Chochlíková	Muaythai Evening 8	Trenčín, Slovakia	Decision (Unanimous)	3	3:00
Defendes the WAKO Super Flyweight title.
25 Mar 2017	Win	(France) Ludivine Lasnier	Meaux Fight VI	Meaux, France	Decision (Unanimous)	3	3:00
28 Jan 2017	Win	(France) Yolande Alonso	Burning Series	Gaillard, France	Decision (Unanimous)	3	3:00
19 Nov 2016	Win	(France) Fanny Ramos	Radikal Fight Night Gold	Charleville-Mézières, France	Decision (Unanimous)	3	3:00
29 Oct 2016	Win	(France) Lou-Anne Pimentel	Spirit Boxing Show	Nogent-sur-Seine, France	Decision (Unanimous)	3	3:00
22 May 2016	Win	(Switzerland) Daniela Sprecher	Victory	Milan, Italy	Decision (Unanimous)	3	3:00
23 Jan 2016	Draw	(France) Yolande Alonso	Burning Muay Thai Series 5	Arbent, France	Decision (Unanimous)	3	3:00
28 Nov 2015	Loss	(Italy) Stella Bartoletti	Gladiator	Bologna, Italy	Decision (Unanimous)	3	3:00
19 Sep 2015	Win	(France) Fanny Ramos	Swiss Fight Night	Lugano, Switzerland	Decision (Unanimous)	3	3:00
23 May 2015	Win	(Italy) Mara Sadocco	Total Fight	Milan, Italy	Decision (Unanimous)	3	3:00
25 Apr 2015	Win	(Italy) Barbara Bontempi	Ring Mania 3	Lodi, Italy	Decision (Unanimous)	3	3:00
28 Feb 2015	Win	(Portugal) Ariana Santos	Ring War	Milan, Italy	Decision (Unanimous)	3	3:00
28 Jun 2014	Loss	(Italy) Jleana Valentino	360° Fight Night	Taranto, Italy	Decision (Unanimous)	3	3:00
22 Mar 2014	Win	(Italy) Barbara Bontempi	The Fighters Pro	Milan, Italy	TKO	3	3:00
23 Feb 2014	Win	(Italy) Ilaria Stivanello	Fast And Furious	Milan, Italy	Decision (Unanimous)	3	3:00
30 Nov 2013	Win	(Italy) Francesca Cigolini	The Night Of Kick And Punch	Milan, Italy	Decision (Unanimous)	3	3:00
15 Nov 2013	Loss	(Thailand) Lommanee Sor Hirun	Yokkao 5	Pattaya, Thailand	Decision (Unanimous)	3	3:00
18 May 2013	Win	(Finland) Heli Salapuro	Night of Kick and Punch III°edizione	Milan, Italy	Decision (Unanimous)	3	3:00
13 Apr 2013	Win	(England) Ruqsana Begum	Last Man Standing	Birmingham, England	TKO	3	3:00
Wins the ISKA World Muaythai Bantamweight title.
26 Jan 2013	Win	(England) Denise Castle	Yokkao Extreme	Milan, Italy	Decision (Unanimous)	3	3:00
10 Nov 2012	Loss	(Sweden) Johanna Rydberg	Night of Kick and Punch II°edizione	Riccione, Italy	Decision (Unanimous)	3	3:00
14 Jul 2012	Loss	(Sweden) Susan Kariuki	Gala Kick & Punch	Milan, Italy	Decision (Unanimous)	3	3:00
19 May 2012	Win	(Austria) Elke Beinwachs	Gala Kick & Punch	Milan, Italy	TKO	3	3:00
21 Jan 2012	Win	(Portugal) Ariana Santos	Yokkao Extreme	Milan, Italy	Decision (Unanimous)	3	3:00
8 Oct 2011	Win	(Spain) Sarai Medina	Muaythai The Art Of Fighting	Tarragona, Spain	Decision (Unanimous)	3	3:00
4 Jun 2011	Loss	(Japan) Erika Kamimura	RISE 78	Tokyo, Japan	TKO	3	3:00
30 Apr 2011	Win	(Spain) Sarai Medina	Ring Rules	Milan, Italy	Decision (Unanimous)	3	3:00
12 Feb 2011	Win	(Romania) GEARAP	Desio	Milan, Italy	Decision (Unanimous)	3	3:00
6 Feb 2011	Win	(Scotland) Amy Pirnie	Night Kick Out V	Lucca, Italy	DQ	3	3:00
7 Nov 2010	Win	(Italy) Gabriella Rutigliano	Gladiatori	Bologna, Italy	Decision (Unanimous)	3	3:00
10 Jul 2010	Win	(Greece) Emy Kougioumtzoglou	Otranto	Lecce, Italy	Decision (Unanimous)	3	3:00
11 Apr 2010	Loss	(Croatia) Zeljana Pitesa	Fight Day 10	Santeramo, Italy	Decision (Unanimous)	3	3:00
20 Mar 2010	Win	(Turkey) Ozge San	Kickboxing Superstar	Milan, Italy	KO	3	3:00
Defendes the WAKO Super Flyweight title.
14 Feb 2010	Win	(Spain) Maribel De Souza	The Woman Warrior	Barcelona, Spain	Decision (Unanimous)	3	3:00
Wins the WKN European title.
20 Dec 2009	Win	(Japan) Motoe Abe	J-Girls Final Stage 2009	Tokyo, Japan	Decision (Unanimous)	3	3:00
J GIRLS World Queen Tournament Finals.
20 Dec 2009	Win	(South Korea) Ho Seongbok	J-Girls Final Stage 2009	Tokyo, Japan	Decision (Unanimous)	3	3:00
J GIRLS World Queen Tournament Semi-finals.
20 Dec 2009	Win	(Japan) Graycer Aki	J-Girls Final Stage 2009	Tokyo, Japan	Decision (Unanimous)	3	3:00
J GIRLS World Queen Tournament Quarter-finals.
20 Nov 2009	Win	(Italy) Gabriella Rutigliano	Ring Rules	Milan, Italy	Decision (Unanimous)	3	3:00
11 Jul 2009	Win	(Italy) Silvia Valicelli	Best Of The Best 7	Jesolo, Italy	Decision (Unanimous)	3	3:00
14 Mar 2009	Win	(Netherlands) Linda Ooms	OKTAGON	Milan, Italy	Decision (Unanimous)	3	3:00
Wins the WAKO World Super Flyweight title.
25 Jan 2009	Win	(Italy) Marilena Andronico	Night Fight Girl	Rome, Italy	Decision (Unanimous)	3	3:00
30 Nov 2008	Win	(Italy) Silvia Morelli	Rimini	Rimini, Italy	Decision (Unanimous)	3	3:00
25 May 2008	Win	(Japan) Graycer Aki	J-Girls World Queen Tournament 2008	Tokyo, Japan	Decision (Split)	4	3:00
J GIRLS World Queen Tournament Finals.
25 May 2008	Win	(Japan) Shoko Ayashida	J-Girls World Queen Tournament 2008	Tokyo, Japan	Decision (Unanimous)	3	3:00
J GIRLS World Queen Tournament Semi-finals.
20 Apr 2008	Win	(Italy) Stella Morelli	Gladiators Tournament III	Osimo, Italy	Decision (Unanimous)	3	3:00
17 Feb 2008	Win	(Greece) Maria Tzortzi	Gladiators Tournament	Osimo, Italy	Decision (Unanimous)	3	3:00
22 Apr 2007	Loss	(Italy) Perla Bragagnolo	Gala Internazionale Di Thai Boxe	Ivrea, Italy	Decision (Unanimous)	3	3:00
22 Apr 2007	Draw	(Italy) Maria Zorzi	Jesolo Fight Night	Jesolo, Italy	Decision (Unanimous)	3	3:00
12 Nov 2006	Win	(Hungary) Petra Buchberger	?	Milan, Italy	Decision (Unanimous)	3	3:00
16 Apr 2006	Win	(Greece) Maria Tzortzi	?	Bellaria – Igea Marina, Italy	Decision (Unanimous)	3	3:00
16 Apr 2006	Win	(Italy) Amal Elabdaoui	?	Bellaria – Igea Marina, Italy	Decision (Unanimous)	3	3:00
12 Feb 2006	Draw	(Italy) Silvia Valicelli	?	Rimini, Italy	Decision (Unanimous)	3	3:00
23 Jul 2005	Win	(Italy) Perla Bragagnolo	?	Milan, Italy	Decision (Unanimous)	3	3:00
27 Feb 2005	Loss	(Italy) Silvia Valicelli	?	Rimini, Italy	Decision (Unanimous)	3	3:00
20 Nov 2004	Loss	(France) Kaina Arioche	?	Paris, France	Decision (Unanimous)	3	3:00
10 Apr 2004	Win	(Italy) Silvia Valicelli	?	Milan, Italy	Decision (Unanimous)	3	3:00
Legend: Win Loss Draw/No contest Notes

== See also ==
- List of female kickboxers
