= Kotomi (kickboxer) =

Japanese kickboxer

Kotomi Misawa
- Born: 三澤壽美; 28 July 1996 (age 30); Shibuya, Tokyo, Japan
- Other names: KOTOMI
- Nationality: Japanese
- Height: 1.64 m (5 ft 4 1/2 in)
- Weight: 52 kg (115 lb; 8 st 3 lb)
- Division: Flyweight
- Style: Kickboxing
- Fighting out of: Shibuya, Tokyo, Japan
- Team: Next Level Shibuya
- Years active: 2016 - present

Kickboxing record
- Total: 16
- Wins: 12
- By knockout: 2
- Losses: 4
- Last updated on: November 7, 2020

Kotomi Misawa (born 28 July 1996), popularly known as KOTOMI, is a retired Japanese kickboxer, who competed in K-1 and Krush, where she was the Krush Women's Flyweight champion.

She was ranked as a top ten pound for pound female kickboxer by Combat Press between February 2021 and April 2023, as well as by Beyond Kick between November 2022 and April 2023.

== Kickboxing career ==
=== Early career ===
Kotomi made her KHAOS debut during KHAOS 4, with a TKO win over Texas Ayumi. She won her next fight against RINA by unanimous decision. In her next fight, Kotomi fought Chin Long Wang during Krush 94. She won the fight by decision.

Kotomi then fought Josefine Lindgren Knutsson during Krush 104. Knutsson won the fight by unanimous decision. In her next fight, she fought Yau Pui Yu, and likewise lost the fight by decision.

She made her K-1 debut against Mahiro, during K-1 World GP 2019 Japan. Kotomi won the fight by unanimous decision. Kotomi was scheduled to fight NA☆NA during Krush 113. She won the fight by unanimous decision.

Kotomi's highest profile matchup came during K-1 World GP 2020 in Fukuoka, when she was scheduled to fight Kana Morimoto. She won the fight by majority decision, which was considered a massive upset.

=== Krush Flyweight title reign ===
She took part in the Krush flyweight tournament, which was held during Krush 121. Kotomi faced Yoshimi in the tournament semifinals. She won the fight by unanimous decision. Advancing to the tournament finals, she was scheduled to fight Mahiro at Krush 124. The fight was a rematch, with Kotomi having won their first bout by unanimous decision. Kotomi won the fight by unanimous decision. During the post-match press conference, Kotomi announced her desire to fight a rematch with Kana Morimoto, for the K-1 Flyweight title.

Kotomi was scheduled to face Rikako Sakurai in a 53 kg catchweight bout at K-1 World GP 2021: Yokohamatsuri on September 20, 2021. She won the fight by unanimous decision, with all three judges scoring the fight 30-28 in her favor.

Kotomi was scheduled to challenge the K-1 Women's Flyweight champion Kana Morimoto at K-1 World GP 2022 Japan on February 27, 2022. The two of them previously fought on November 3, 2020, with Kotomi winning by unanimous decision. Kotomi later withdrew from the bout, for undisclosed reasons, and was replaced by Ran.

Kotomi announced her retirement from all professional competition on August 1, 2023, as she experienced post concussion syndrome after sparring.

== Championships and accomplishments ==
=== Kickboxing ===
- K-1
  - K-1 Women's Amateur B Class Tournament (-50 kg)
  - Krush Flyweight (-50 kg) Championship

=== Awards ===
- Combat Press
  - 2020 "Female Fighter of the Year" nominee

== Fight record ==
Kickboxing record
12 wins (2 KOs), 4 losses
Date	Result	Opponent	Event	Location	Method	Round	Time
2021-09-20	Win	(Japan) Rikako Sakurai	K-1 World GP 2021: Yokohamatsuri	Yokohama, Japan	Decision (Unanimous)	3	3:00
2021-04-23	Win	(Japan) Mahiro	Krush 124, Tournament Final	Tokyo, Japan	Decision (Unanimous)	3	3:00
For the Krush Women's Flyweight title.
2021-01-23	Win	(Japan) Yoshimi	Krush 121, Tournament Semifinal	Tokyo, Japan	Decision (Unanimous)	3	3:00
2020-11-03	Win	(Japan) Kana Morimoto	K-1 World GP 2020 in Fukuoka	Fukuoka, Japan	Decision (Unanimous)	3	3:00
2020-06-28	Win	(Japan) NA☆NA	Krush 113	Tokyo, Japan	Decision (Unanimous)	3	3:00
2019-12-28	Win	(Japan) Mahiro	K-1 World GP 2019 Japan: ～Women's Flyweight Championship Tournament～	Nagoya, Japan	Decision (Unanimous)	3	3:00
2019-11-02	Loss	(Hong Kong) Yau Pui Yu	KF1 Fight 32	Hong Kong	Decision (Unanimous)	3	3:00
2019-08-31	Loss	(Sweden) Josefine Lindgren Knutsson	Krush 104	Tokyo, Japan	Decision (Unanimous)	3	3:00
2018-10-28	Win	(Taiwan) Chin Long Wang	Krush 94	Tokyo, Japan	Decision (Unanimous)	3	3:00
2018-05-26	Win	(Japan) RINA	KHAOS 5	Tokyo, Japan	Decision (Unanimous)	3	3:00
2017-10-14	Win	(Japan) Texas Ayumi	KHAOS 4	Tokyo, Japan	TKO (Referee stoppage)	3	0:32
Legend: Win Loss Draw/No contest Notes

== See also ==
- List of female kickboxers
