= Fanny Ramos =

French kickboxer (born 1995)

- Born: 26 June 1995 (age 31); Montpellier, France
- Nationality: French
- Height: 1.55 m (5 ft 1 in)
- Weight: 48 kg (106 lb; 7 st 8 lb)
- Division: Flyweight; Bantamweight
- Style: Kickboxing
- Fighting out of: Perpignan, France
- Team: Urban Multi BOXE
- Trainer: Hamech Faycal; Claude Salvador
- Years active: 2014 - present

Kickboxing record
- Total: 19
- Wins: 10
- By knockout: 3
- Losses: 9
- By knockout: 2

Fanny Ramos (born 26 June 1995) is a French kickboxer and Nak Muay Farang. She is the current WMC European Mini Flyweight champion and has unsuccessfully challenged for the ISKA Atomweight World K-1 title.

At the amateur level, she was the WAKO Bantamweight gold medalist at the 2014 European and 2017 World Championships.

MuaythaiTV.com awarded her the 2018 Fighter of the Year award.

== Martial arts career ==
In 2014 Ramos' gym organized the UMB Fighting 2, during which she faced Julie Teston-Vigne. Ramos won the fight through a unanimous decision.

After this win however, Ramos entered the worst period of her professional career, entering a five fight losing streak. Her first loss came during Muay Thai Explosion XVII, when she lost a unanimous decision to Sara Donghi. Five months later, she lost a unanimous decision to Camila Rosario. Two months after this loss, she dropped another decision to Myriame Djedidi. During Swiss Fight Night, she faced the WAKO K-1 Super Flyweight champion Silvia La Notte. She lost her fourth unanimous decision in a row. The losing streak was punctuated with the first TKO loss of her professional career, to Amy Pirnie during Yokkao 17 & 18.

She broke her losing streak during La Nuit Des Challenges 15, when she scored a TKO win over Sara Donghi, the third of her professional career.

She lost a decision to Cynthia Gonzales and Silvia La Notte during their rematch.

Ramos then entered the most productive period of her career up to that point, going on a four fight winning streak. She managed decision wins over Yolande Alonso, Martina Bernile, Petsingoen Kor Adisorn and Inês Calado.

In 2018 Ramos won her first major title, the WMC European title, with a decision win over Leigh Newton.

In 2019 she fought Cristina Morales for the ISKA Atomweight World K-1 title. Morales won the title with a third round knockout.

== Championships and accomplishments ==
=== Professional titles ===
- World Muaythai Council
  - WMC European Mini Flyweight Championship

=== Amateur titles ===
- World Association of Kickboxing Organizations
  - (gold) 2014 WAKO European K-1 Championship -48 kg
  - (gold) 2017 WAKO World K-1 Championships -48 kg
- International Federation of Muaythai Associations
  - (gold) 2017 IFMA European Muaythai Championships -48 kg

== Fight record ==
Professional Kickboxing Record
10 Wins (3 (T)KO's), 9 Losses, 0 Draw, 0 No Contest
Date	Result	Opponent	Event	Location	Method	Round	Time
2019-03-30	Loss	(Spain) Cristina Morales	EFC Ultimate Fight Night II	Lons-le-Saunier, France	KO	3	
For ISKA Atomweight K-1 title.
2018-11-24	Win	(United Kingdom) Leigh Newton	Rampage Fighting Championship	Vitry-sur-Seine, France	Decision (Unanimous)	5	3:00
For WMC European Mini Flyweight title.
2018-10-21	Win	(United Kingdom) Lena Kessler	Muay Thai Grand Prix	Paris, France	Decision (Unanimous)	3	3:00
2018-07-21	Loss	(United States) Crystal Newson	Muay Thai Grand Prix	Paris, France	Decision (Unanimous)	3	3:00
2018-05-05	Win	(Portugal) Inês Calado	Capital Fights 3	Paris, France	Decision (Unanimous)	3	3:00
2018-04-14	Win	(Thailand) Petsingoen Kor Adisorn	EFC Ultimate Fight Night	Lons-le-Saunier, France	Decision (Unanimous)	3	3:00
2017-11-25	Win	(Italy) Martina Bernile	Bobigny Boxing Day II	Bobigny, France	Decision (Unanimous)	3	3:00
2017-03-11	Win	(France) Yolande Alonso	Ultimate Fight 3	Lavérune, France	Decision (Unanimous)	3	3:00
2016-11-19	Loss	(Italy) Silvia La Notte	Radikal Fight Night Gold	Charleville-Mézières, France	Decision (Unanimous)	3	3:00
2016-06-11	Loss	(Cuba) Cynthia Gonzales	Ceinture Lahouari Othmane	Quimperlé, France	Decision (Unanimous)	3	3:00
2016-05-21	Win	(Italy) Sara Donghi	La Nuit Des Challenges 15	Perpignan, France	TKO (Three knockdowns)	2	
2016-03-19	Loss	(Scotland) Amy Pirnie	Yokkao 17 & 18	Bolton, England	TKO (Three knockdowns)	3	
2015-09-19	Loss	(Italy) Silvia La Notte	Swiss Fight Night	Lugano, Switzerland	Decision (Unanimous)	3	3:00
2015-06-06	Loss	(France) Myriame Djedidi	Boxing Factory Trophy 2015	Colomiers, France	Decision (Unanimous)	3	3:00
2015-04-25	Loss	(France) Camila Rosario	Thai Master	Pau, France	Decision (Unanimous)	3	3:00
2014-11-08	Loss	(Italy) Sara Donghi	Muay Thai Explosion XVII	Sassari, Italy	Decision (Unanimous)	3	3:00
2014-05-18	Win	(France) Julie Teston-Vigne	UMB Fighting 2	Perpignan, France	Decision (Unanimous)	3	3:00
2014-04-21	Win	(Thailand) ?	Muaythai Super Fight	Phuket, Thailand	KO	2	
2014	Win	(France) Lisiane Payet		France	KO		
Legend: Win Loss Draw/No contest Notes

Amateur Kickboxing Record
Date	Result	Opponent	Event	Location	Method	Round	Time
2017-11-12	Win	(Russia) Fatima Zhagupova	2017 WAKO World Championships, Tournament Final	Budapest, Hungary	Decision (Unanimous)	3	2:00
Won the 2017 WAKO World Championships (-48 kg) K-1 Gold Medal.
2017-11-10	Win	(Turkey) Esmer Zilan	2017 WAKO World Championships, Tournament Semifinal	Budapest, Hungary	Decision (Unanimous)	3	2:00
2017-10-22	Win	(Russia) Daria Ganzvind	2017 IFMA European Muaythai Championships, Tournament Final	Paris, France	Decision (Unanimous)	3	2:00
Won the 2017 IFMA European Muaythai Championships (-48 kg) Gold Medal.
2017-10-20	Win	(Turkey) Songul Kucuktas	2017 IFMA European Muaythai Championships, Tournament Final	Paris, France	Decision (Unanimous)	3	2:00
2015-08-17	Loss	(Vietnam) Thanh Truc Nguyen Thi	2015 IFMA Royal World Cup, Tournament Quarterfinals	Bangkok, Thailand	TKO (Referee stoppage)	1	
2014-11-16	Win	(Turkey) Deniz Demircan	The Princes Of Salm III	France	KO (Knee)	3	
2014-10-26	Win	(Russia) Fatima Zhagupova	2014 WAKO European Championships, Tournament Final	Bilbao, Spain	Decision (Unanimous)	3	2:00
Won the 2014 WAKO European Championships (-48 kg) K-1 Gold Medal.
2014-10-24	Win	(Turkey)	2014 WAKO European Championships, Tournament Semifinal	Bilbao, Spain	Decision (Unanimous)	3	2:00
Legend: Win Loss Draw/No contest Notes

== See also ==
- List of female kickboxers
