= Lizzie Largillière =

French kickboxer

- Born: 26 April 1987 (age 39); Toulouse, France
- Nickname: "Lizzie"
- Nationality: French
- Height: 1.65 m (5 ft 5 in)
- Weight: 54 kg (119 lb; 8 st 7 lb)
- Division: Bantamweight
- Style: Kickboxing
- Fighting out of: Toulouse, France
- Team: Team Bonadeï
- Years active: 2010 – present

Kickboxing record
- Total: 31
- Wins: 23
- Losses: 8

Lizzie Largillière (born 26 April 1987) is a French kickboxer. She is the current ISKA World Kickboxing Super Flyweight champion.

She is the former WMC World Bantamweight champion, the former Enfusion 52 kg champion, and the former ISKA European Kickboxing Flyweight champion. At the amateur level she was the 2011 WAKO World and 2012 European gold medalist.

== Kickboxing career ==
In 2011, Lizzie fought Iman Barlow during La Nuit du Kick Boxing. Barlow won a unanimous decision.

Largillière participated in the Enfusion Victory of the Vixen as a contender.

During Open des Yvelines de Muay Thai she fought Myriame Djedidi. Lizzie lost a unanimous decision. Fighting with Enfusion she won a unanimous decision against Isis Verbeek, and lost a unanimous decision to Ashley Nichols.

Largillière won the ISKA European Flyweight title, with a unanimous decision against Gloria Peritore.

In 2015, Largillière won the WMC World Bantamweight title with a win over Petchoyding Mor.

During Enfusion 40 Lizzie faced Rita Marrero. She won a unanimous decision.

In 2017, she won the ISKA World Super Flyweight title with a decision win over Valeria Calabrese.

During Enfusion 68 she fought Lara Fernandez for the Enfusion 52 kg world title. Largillière won the title by a unanimous decision.

== Championships and accomplishments ==
=== Amateur titles ===
- World Association of Kickboxing Organizations
  - (gold) 2011 WAKO Senior World Championships 52 kg
  - (gold) 2012 WAKO Senior European Championships 52 kg

=== Professional titles ===
- International Sports Karate Association
  - ISKA World Full Contact Kickboxing Super Flyweight Championship (One time, current)
  - ISKA World Full Contact Kickboxing Super Flyweight Championships
- World Muaythai Council
  - WMC World Bantamweight Championship
- Enfusion
  - Enfusion 52 kg World Championship

== Kickboxing record ==
Kickboxing record
23 wins, 8 losses
Date	Result	Opponent	Event	Location	Method	Round	Time	Record
6 Oct 2018	Win	(Spain) Lara Fernandez	Enfusion 68	Newcastle, England	Decision (Unanimous)	5	3:00	
Wins the Enfusion 52 kg title.
21 Apr 2018	Win	(Italy) Roberta Sarcissela	Kick Boxing Championnat d'Europe	Sainte-Maxime, France	TKO	2		
24 Mar 2018	Draw	(France) Emma Gongora	Louna Boxing	Château-Arnoux-Saint-Auban, France	Decision (Unanimous)	3	3:00	
13 Jan 2018	Loss	(France) Amel Dehby	Nuit Des Gladiateurs 9	Marseille, France	Decision (Unanimous)	3	3:00	
9 Dec 2017	Loss	(Italy) Gloria Peritore	Bellator 190	Florence, Italy	Decision (Unanimous)	3	3:00	
18 Mar 2017	Win	(Italy) Valeria Calabrese	ISKA World Title	Muret, France	Decision (Unanimous)	5	3:00	
Wins the ISKA World Super Flyweight title.
4 Jun 2016	Win	(Spain) Rita Marrero	Enfusion 40	Gran Canaria, Spain	Decision (Unanimous)	3	3:00	
4 Aug 2015	Win	(Thailand) Petchoyding Mor	Fight Night	Saint-Tropez, France	TKO	4		
Wins the WMC World Bantamweight title.
16 May 2015	Win	(Italy) Gloria Peritore	La Nuit de l'Impact	Saintes, Charente-Maritime, France	Decision (Unanimous)	5	3:00	
Wins the ISKA European Flyweight title.
23 Nov 2014	Loss	(Canada) Ashley Nichols	Enfusion 22	Groningen, Netherlands	Decision (Unanimous)	3	3:00	
4 Oct 2014	Win	(Netherlands) Isis Verbeek	Enfusion 21	Ko Samui, Thailand	Decision (Unanimous)	3	3:00	
31 May 2014	Loss	(France) Myriame Djedidi	Open des Yvelines de Muay Thai	Trappes, France	Decision (Unanimous)	3	3:00	
18 May 2013	Loss	(France) Kalissa Houicha	Gala de Boxe Thaï à Nice	Nice, France	Decision (Split)	3	3:00	
27 Apr 2013	Win	(France) Jennifer Martinez	Championnat De France Boxe Thai	Château-Thierry, France	Decision (Unanimous)	3	3:00	
16 Mar 2013	Win	(France) Myriame Djedidi	Kick Imperator V – K1 Rules Explosion	L'Île-Rousse, France	Decision (Unanimous)	3	3:00	
26 Nov 2011	Loss	(United Kingdom) Iman Barlow	La Nuit du Kick Boxing	Les Mureaux, France	Decision (Unanimous)	3	3:00	
Legend: Win Loss Draw/No contest Notes

== See also ==
List of female kickboxers

List of female ISKA champions
