= Amy Pirnie =

Scottish kickboxer

- Born: 6 May 1993 (age 33); Glasgow, Scotland
- Height: 1.60 m (5 ft 3 in)
- Weight: 50 kg (110 lb; 7 st 12 lb)
- Division: Strawweight; Flyweight; Super-flyweight
- Style: Kickboxing
- Stance: Orthodox
- Fighting out of: Glasgow, Scotland
- Team: Inferno Muay Thai Gym Glasgow
- Trainer: Rab Izat
- Years active: 2008 - present

Kickboxing record
- Total: 33
- Wins: 27
- By knockout: 11
- Losses: 5
- By knockout: 1
- Draws: 1

Other information
- Occupation: Muay Thai coach
- University: City of Glasgow College; Teesside University
- Boxing record from BoxRec

Amy Pirnie (born 6 May 1993) is a Scottish Muay Thai fighter and kickboxer, who has most recently competed with Yokkao and Enfusion. She is the reigning Lion Fight super-flyweight champion, and the reigning ISKA strawweight world champion.

She is the former World Boxing Council Muaythai International flyweight champion and the former Enfusion 52 kg Champion.

In 2015, 2016 and 2019, the UK Muay Thai Awards voted her the best female fighter of the year. She has throughout her career been considered as one of the best female kickboxers in the world.

== Kickboxing career ==
=== Amateur career ===
Amy Pirnie began training in muay thai and kickboxing at 12 years old when she met her current coach Rab Izat at the Phoenix Thai Boxing Club in Glasgow. Three years later, at 15 years old, she participated in the IFMA World Championships where she won the junior gold medal. Next year, she won the junior and adult gold medal.

=== Professional career ===
In 2008, following her IFMA title win, she made her pro debut for the ISKA British 53 kg title, against Sofia Christodoulou. She won the fight by decision to clinch her first pro title.

In 2011 she faced the WAKO world titlist Silvia La Notte, during Night Kick Out 5. She suffered her first professional loss, by way of DQ.

Following this loss, she went on a seven fight winning streak, culminating with a fight versus Barbara Bontempi for the WBC Muaythai International title. She won the fight in the fourth round by TKO.

After a win against Dakota Ditcheva, she faced Monica Santos for the ISKA world flyweight title. She won the fight in the third round by KO.

Pirnie was scheduled to face Aline Seiberth at Enfusion 68 on 9 June 2019. She won the fight by a first-round knockout.

Pirnie fought a rematch with Silvia La Notte for the Enfusion 52 kg championship at Enfusion 80 on 23 March 2019. She won the fight by unanimous decision.

Pirine fought Sandra Godvik for the inaugural Lion Fight super-flyweight championship at Lion Fight 54 on 20 April 2019. She won the fight by a first-round knockout.

Pirnie was scheduled to make her first Lion Fight super-flyweight title defense against Loomanee W. Santai at 31 August 2019. Pirnie won the fight by split decision.

Pirnie was scheduled to defend her ISKA Muay Thai strawweight world championship against the 2019 IFMA champion Tessa Kakkonen at Total Fight Night 4 on 12 October 2019. Pirnie won the fight by unanimous decision.

Pirnie was scheduled to make her second Lion Fight title defense against Lara Fernandez at Lion Fight 68 on 22 August 2021. She won the closely contested bout by split decision.

On May 23, 2023, Pirnie announced she withdrew from negotiations with K-1, regarding a potential fight with their flyweight champion Kana Morimoto, as the promotion prematurely announced the fight before the terms of it were ironed out.

=== ONE Championship ===
In her promotional debut, Pirnie faced Yu Yau Pui on August 3, 2024, at ONE Fight Night 24. She won the fight via knockout in round one.

Pirnie faced Shir Cohen at ONE Fight Night 25 on October 5, 2024. At the weigh-ins, Cohen weighed in at 119.25 pounds, 4.25 pounds over the atomweight limit. The bout proceeded at catchweight and Cohen was fined 50% of her purse which went to Pirnie. Pirnie lost the fight via unanimous decision.

== Championships and accomplishments ==
=== Amateur titles ===
- International Federation of Muaythai Associations
  - (gold) 2008 IFMA Junior World Championship
  - (gold) 2009 IFMA Junior World Championship
  - (gold) 2009 IFMA Adult World Championship

=== Professional titles ===
- World Boxing Council Muaythai
  - WBC Muaythai Flyweight International championship (One time, former)
- International Sport Karate Association
  - ISKA Super Flyweight British championship (One time, former)
  - ISKA Muay Thai Strawweight World Championship
    - One successful title defense
- Enfusion
  - Enfusion 52 kg World Championship
- Lion Fight
  - Lion Fight super-flyweight Championship
    - Two successful title defenses

=== Awards ===
- ONE Championship
  - 2024: Ranked #4 Knockout of the Year vs. Yu Yau Pui
- U.K. Muay Thai Awards
  - 2015 Female Fighter of the Year
  - 2016 Female Fighter of the Year
  - 2019 Female Fighter of the Year

== Fight record ==
Professional Kickboxing and Muay Thai record
27 wins (11 KOs), 5 losses, 1 draw
Date	Result	Opponent	Event	Location	Method	Round	Time	Record
2024-10-05	Loss	(Israel) Shir Cohen	ONE Fight Night 25	Bangkok, Thailand	Decision (Unanimous)	3	3:00	27–5–1
2024-08-03	Win	(Hong Kong) Yu Yau Pui	ONE Fight Night 24	Bangkok, Thailand	KO (Left hook)	1	0:49	27–4–1
2021-08-22	Win	(Spain) Lara Fernandez	Lion Fight 68	Glasgow, Scotland	Decision (Split)	5	3:00	26–4–1
Defends the Lion Fight Super Flyweight Title.
2019-10-12	Win	(Finland) Tessa Kakkonen	Total Fight Night 4	Lahti, Finland	Decision (Unanimous)	5	3:00	25–4–1
Defends the ISKA Muay Thai World Strawweight Title.
2019-08-31	Win	(Thailand) Loomanee W. Santai	Lion Fight 59	Gothenburg, Sweden	Decision (Unanimous)	5	3:00	24–4–1
Defends the Lion Fight Super Flyweight Title.
2019-06-08	Win	(France) Cindy Silvestre	Blackpool Rebellion	Promenade, United Kingdom	KO (Left hook to the body)	3	1:58	23–4–1
2019-04-20	Win	(Sweden) Sandra Godvik	Lion Fight 54	Albuquerque, New Mexico, United States	KO (Knee to the body)	1	0:47	22–4–1
Wins the Lion Fight Super Flyweight Title.
2019-03-23	Win	(Italy) Silvia La Notte	Enfusion 80	Rome, Italy	Decision (Unanimous)	5	3:00	21–4–1
Wins Enfusion World 52 kg Title.
2018-08-04	Win	(Scotland) Yasmin Nazary	MTB in Linwood	Linwood, United Kingdom	Decision (Unanimous)	5	2:00	20–4–1
2018-06-09	Win	(Switzerland) Aline Seiberth	Enfusion 68	Newcastle, United Kingdom	KO (Knee to the body)	1	3:00	19–4–1
2018-03-10	Win	(Italy) Ilenia Perugini	Yokkao 30	Bolton, United Kingdom	Decision (Unanimous)	5	3:00	18–4–1
2017-10-15	Win	(Sweden) Josefine Lindgren Knutsson	Yokkao 28	Bolton, United Kingdom	Decision (Unanimous)	5	3:00	17–4–1
2017-03-13	Win	(Spain) Monica Santos	Ultimate Muay-Thai 4	Paisley, United Kingdom	KO (Right hook to the body)	3	3:00	16–4–1
Wins ISKA Muay Thai World Strawweight Title.
2017-03-25	Win	(United Kingdom) Dakota Ditcheva	Yokkao 24	Bolton, United Kingdom	Decision (Unanimous)	3	3:00	15–4–1
2016-11-19	Win	(Italy) Barbara Bontempi	Fight Sport Extreme	Stepps, United Kingdom	KO (Right hook to the body)	4	3:00	14–4–1
Wins WBC Muaythai International Flyweight Title.
2016-10-08	Win	(France) Ludivine Lasnier	Yokkao 20	Bolton, United Kingdom	TKO	2	3:00	13-4–1
2016-04-30	Win	(Turkey) Feride Kirat	Power Of Scotland 21	Paisley, United Kingdom	TKO	5	3:00	12–4–1
2016-03-19	Win	(France) Fanny Ramos	Yokkao 18	Bolton, United Kingdom	TKO (Referee stoppage)	3	2:50	11-4–1
2015-12-12	Win	(France) Myriame Djedidi	Fight Sport Extreme	Stepps, United Kingdom	Decision (Unanimous)	3	3:00	10-4–1
2015-09-19	Win	(United Kingdom) Nicola Kaye	Fight Sport Extreme	Stepps, United Kingdom	Decision (Unanimous)	3	3:00	9-4–1
2015-07-04	Win	(Norway) Anne Line Hogstad	Stand And Bang	Woking, United Kingdom	Decision (Unanimous)	3	3:00	8-4–1
2015-03-29	Win	(United Kingdom) Jade Sandlan	Battle Of The Envi 2	Liverpool, United Kingdom	KO	2	3:00	7–4–1
N/A	Win	(United Kingdom) Sofia Christodoulou		United Kingdom	Decision (Unanimous)	3	3:00	6–4–1
2013-07-27	Loss	(United Kingdom) Christi Brereton		Devon, United Kingdom	Decision (Unanimous)	5	2:00	5–4–1
2011-11-17	Loss	(United Kingdom) Iman Barlow		United Kingdom	TKO (Knee to the body)	3	3:00	5-3–1
2011-02-06	Loss	(Italy) Silvia La Notte	Night Kick Out V	Lucca, United Kingdom	DQ	3	3:00	5-2–1
2010-12	Loss	(United Kingdom) Sophie Hawkswell						5–1–1
2009-10-17	Win	(United Kingdom) Lanchana Green		United Kingdom	Decision (Unanimous)	3	3:00	5–0–1
2009-10-04	Win	(United Kingdom) Jill Watmough	Master A's Amazing Muay Thai	United Kingdom	Decision	3	2:00	4–0–1
2009-09-13	Win	(United Kingdom) Louise Hamilton	Oran Mor III	United Kingdom	TKO	1		3–0–1
2009-05-09	Win	(United Kingdom) Lauren Humphreys	Ladykillers III	United Kingdom	Decision (Unanimous)	3	3:00	2–0–1
2008-08-02	Win	(United Kingdom) Karen Martin		United Kingdom	Decision (Unanimous)	3	3:00	1–0–1
2008	Draw	(United Kingdom) Iman Barlow		United Kingdom	Decision (Unanimous)	3	3:00	0–0–1
Legend: Win Loss Draw/No contest Notes

== See also ==
- List of female kickboxers
- List of female ISKA champions
