= Ruqsana Begum =

English professional kickboxer and boxer (born 1983)

- Born: 15 October 1983 (age 43); Bethnal Green, London, England
- Native name: রুকসানা বেগম
- Other names: Warrior Princess
- Nationality: Bangladeshi, British
- Height: 5 ft 3 in (1.60 m)
- Weight: 48 kg (106 lb)
- Division: Atomweight
- Style: Muay Thai kickboxing (now boxing)
- Fighting out of: Bethnal Green, Tower Hamlets, London, England
- Team: British Muay Thai Team
- Trainer: Bill Judd
- Years active: 2008–present

Other information
- Occupation: Kickboxer, Now Boxer
- University: University of Westminster
- Notable club: KO Gym
- Website: www.ruqsana-begum.com

Ruqsana Begum (Bengali: রুকসানা বেগম; born 15 October 1983) is a British professional kickboxer and boxer. She was a World Kickboxing Association female Atomweight (48–50 kg) Muay Thai boxing champion and captain of the British Muay Thai Team. In March 2018, Begum made the switch from professional kickboxing to boxing.

== Early life ==
Begum was born and bought up in Bethnal Green, London, England to a family of Bangladeshi origin. She comes from a traditional, religious family and grew up in a strict Muslim household.

Begum's paternal grandfather moved to the United Kingdom from Sylhet Division, Bangladesh, to fight for the British in the Second World War. Her father, Awlad, worked as a tailor-cum-machinist in a factory making leather jackets for high street fashion stores and her mother, Minara, was a housewife. She is the second eldest of four children.

Begum went to the local primary school and then to Swanlea School. She studied A-levels in art, history, Bengali, media studies. After studying at UzSWLU in Tashkent, Uzbekistan, in 2006, Begum graduated with a degree in architecture from the University of Westminster. She was a trainee architect and was made redundant after the company she worked for made cuts. She is a part-qualified architect.

As a child, Begum played football, badminton and swimming. Since the age of five or six she has been fascinated by martial arts and was inspired by Muhammad Ali and Bruce Lee.

== Professional kickboxing career ==
In 2002, at the age of 18, Begum took up a kickboxing class after college. She initially did it as a hobby in secret due to concerns that her family may not approve. She got herself a part-time job in a chemist, started university and would train every Sunday. In 2006, soon after she graduated from university, she told her family that she was practising Muay Thai, after she had kept it a secret from her family for almost five years. however, after they saw the gym and they didn't try to stop Begum. In 2008, she started fighting professionally.

In 2009, Begum defeated a Malaysian opponent to win a bronze medal at the World Amateur Kickboxing Championship in Bangkok, Thailand.

On 27 November 2010, in her first final, Begum defeated Paige Farrington to win the British Muay Thai Atomweight Kickboxing Championship Professional title from the Duel at the Dome contest in Doncaster. Begum is the only Muslim woman who is a national champion in her sport.

On 31 July 2011, Begum won a gold medal at the European Club Cup Amateur Muay Thai Championship in Latvia. She beat a Finnish fighter to secure her place in the final and beat a Turkish fighter in the final to be awarded gold.

On 6 September 2012, Begum was nominated as British Muay Thai Team Captain and won bronze at the International Federation of Muaythai Amateur (IFMA) World Championships in Saint Petersburg, Russia. On 9 September 2012, she beat Ranini Cundasawmy from Mauritius in the quarter-final, before losing her semi-final match, on 11 September 2012, against the European champion, Chyslova Liudmila, from Belarus who proceeded to win silver.

On 13 April 2013, Begum fought Silvia La Notte from Italy at the New Bingley Hall in Birmingham for the International Sport Kickboxing Association (ISKA) World Championship. Although Begum was leading on points, during the fourth round the fight was abandoned after she took a knock to the head.

On 14 March 2015, she contested the International Sport Kickboxing Association (ISKA) Women's straw-weight world title fight against French national champion, Ludivine Lasnier, at the ILEC Conference Centre in Earls Court, London but lost the title on points.

On 7 November 2015, she was due to contest the World Kickboxing Association (WKA) title against Josefine Lindgren Knutsson of Sweden in Hackney, London, however, after Begum suffered from a virus the fight was postponed until February 2016 and rescheduled for 23 April against Susanna Salmijärvi which she contested and won.

Begum trains under Bill Judd, and fights out of the KO Gym in Bethnal Green, London. She trains six times a week for two hours each day, and during the build-up to a fight she trains twice a day. She also does yoga.

She is signed up by RDX Equipment and her main sponsor is DCD Property Company. In September 2016, Begum signed with Shakir Entertainment Management in New York City.

== Professional boxing career ==
Ruqsana Begum
Personal information
- Nickname: 'Warrior Princess'
- Born: 15 October 1983 (age 43) Bethnal Green, London, UK
- Height: 5 ft 3 in (1.60 m)
- Weight: Super flyweight

Boxing career
- Stance: Orthodox

Boxing record
- Total fights: 8
- Wins: 5
- Losses: 2
- Draws: 1

In January 2018, Begum signed a three-year a managerial contract with Joe Joyce's handler Sam Jones and Adam Morallee who made her their first client since forming the management company S-Jam Boxing with plans to turn professional in boxing. She also signed with former heavyweight champion David Haye's Hayemaker Promotions.

On 17 March, Begum made her professional boxing debut under Queensberry Rules against Bulgaria's Ivanka Ivanova in York Hall Bethnal Green, London, which was screened on Channel 5, as an undercard for the Matty Askin vs. Stephen Simmons fight. Begum was scored evenly on the scorecards, 38-38, with the bout called a draw.

== Other work ==
On top of her own professional commitments, Begum is a personal trainer and instructor. She also works as an instructor one night a week giving free after-school Muay Thai classes every Monday at the Lions Den Gym in Chadwell Heath, London for the children in the East End. She also coaches ladies-only classes every Sunday.

From 2006, she worked at an architectural firm in Epping Forest but lost the job because of the Great Recession. From 2009, she worked part-time, two days a week, as an unqualified science technician at Swanlea School in Whitechapel, London.

She is a boxing and Muay Thai coach for Fight for Peace, a charity which uses boxing as a prevention and rehabilitation model to confront the problem of child and youth participation in crime, gangs and gun violence within disadvantaged communities. She is an ambassador for Sporting Equals, a charity who help people from ethnic minorities to access sport, whoever you are and at all levels.

In 2015, Begum created a sports hijab for non-athletes for combat fighting sports and to help more Muslim women get into combat sports. She was first inspired to create the product when she saw sprinter Ruqaya Al-Ghasra struggle to wear a headscarf at the 2006 Asian Games. She thought up the idea during the London 2012 Olympics when she learnt of an American athlete who was told her Islamic headscarf did not meet health and safety requirements. The hijab is a fitted, breathable version of the traditional scarf worn to conceal Muslim women's hair and chests. It uses breathable fabrics and is designed to fit comfortably around the head. In April 2016, she launched her own line of sports hijabs. Begum designed her own line and outsourced manufacturing to a factory in Pakistan, after trying unsuccessfully to line up a manufacturer in England.

== Media appearances ==
In June 2011, Begum was interviewed by Anwarul Hoque on BBC Asian Network. In August 2014, she was interviewed by Sunny and Shay Grewal on BBC London 94.9. In March 2015, she was interviewed by London Live. In September of the same year, she was interviewed by Sky News.

In April 2016, Begum starred in Selfridges advert Incredible Machines. In February 2017, she featured in a 30-second Adidas advert which tells the stories of 15 women athletes and builds on the brand's marketing around defying convention titled 'Unleash Your Creativity'.

In April 2017, Begum was interviewed by Sportshour on BBC World Service. In June, she was interviewed by BBC Three for the "Like A Girl Can" campaign.

In March 2018, David Leon was enlisted by Nowness to make a short documentary called Endurance Test: Ruqsana Begum about how Begum rose to the top of her field.

== Awards and recognition ==
In May 2012, Begum was shortlisted for the Muslim Women's Sport Foundation (MWSF) Ambassador Awards for the United Kingdom Sportswoman of the Year award held at Wembley Stadium.

In January 2012, she was named in the British Bangladeshi Power 100 for her work in education, culture and sports. In February 2012, she won a special achievement award at the Canary Wharf Sports Awards.

In September 2013, Begum was awarded Sports Personality of the Year at the Asian Achievers Awards. In March 2017, she was awarded the UK Sport Inspirational Performance of the Year award at the Lycamobile British Ethnic Diversity Sports Awards (BEDSAs) held at the London Hilton on Park Lane.

In October 2016, Begum was named one of the "Young British Muslim Millennials Changing The World" by The Asian Today.

Born Fighter, the book Begum wrote with Sarah Shepherd about becoming a Muay Thai world champion, was shortlisted for the 2020 William Hill Sports Book of the Year.

In March 2023, Ruqsana beat Tanjila in Dhaka, Bangladesh for the WBU Female Intercontinental Championship.

== Personal life ==
Begum suffers from chronic fatigue syndrome, also known as myalgic encephalomyelitis (ME). Begum has had to adapt her training to accommodate her condition with a strict diet and training regime.

In 2006, at the age of 22, Begum's parents arranged her marriage to Sayed Chowdhury, a banker from Barking. She moved in with her husband and his parents. Her father-in-law was on dialysis and Begum had to juggle healthcare with household duties and her career as an unqualified architect. Eight months later, after collapsing one morning, she spent two days in hospital and was later diagnosed as suffering from severe panic attacks. She moved back home to her parents' house and spent months in bed recuperating. In 2008, her husband filed for divorce.

In March 2012, Begum met Queen Elizabeth II at Walthamstow Town Hall, during the Queen's Diamond Jubilee tour of the UK where the Queen awarded Ruqsana an "Achievement Award for Breaking Down Barriers". She was selected to be an Olympic torchbearer in recognition of her sporting achievements and community work, helping young people to engage in sports and giving them a focus in life in the East London community. On 21 July 2012, she carried the Olympic Torch in Greenwich, London.

In 2017, Begum went on a pilgrimage to Mecca, Saudi Arabia.

== Championships and accomplishments ==
- 2009 – World Amateur Kickboxing Championships (bronze)
- 2010 – British Atomweight Muay Thai Champion
- 2011 – European Club Cup Amateur Muay Thai Championship (gold)
- 2012 – International Federation of Muaythai Amateur World Championships (bronze)
- 2016 – World Kickboxing Association Champion
- 2023 - WBU (World Boxing Union) Female Intercontinental Championship

== See also ==
- British Bangladeshi
- List of British Bangladeshis
- List of female kickboxers
