= Cristina Morales =

Spanish kickboxer (born 1992)

Cristina Morales Martin
- Born: 27 July 1992 (age 34); Córdoba, Spain
- Height: 1.67 m (5 ft 5 1/2 in)
- Weight: 52 kg (115 lb; 8 st 3 lb)
- Division: Atomweight; Flyweight; Super Flyweight
- Style: Kickboxing
- Fighting out of: Córdoba, Spain
- Team: Team Jesus Cabello
- Trainer: Jesus Cabello
- Years active: 2010–present

Kickboxing record
- Total: 59
- Wins: 50
- By knockout: 10
- Losses: 9

Cristina Morales Martin (born 21 July 1992) is a Spanish kickboxer. She is the reigning ISKA Atomweight K1 World Champion, and the former Enfusion 52 kg World Champion.

== Kickboxing career ==
In March 2019, Morales was scheduled to fight Fanny Ramos for the ISKA Atomweight belt. Morales won by a third round high kick knockout. She became the first Spanish ISKA champion.

During Enfusion Ece 1, she faced Emilie Machut. Morales won the fight unanimous decision.

Morales defended her ISKA title against Oumaiima Arhou. She won the fight by unanimous decision.

Morales was scheduled to fight for the vacant Enfusion 52 kg belt against the 57 kg champion Georgina van der Linden, during Enfusion 89. Morales won a split decision, which was considered an upset at the time.

Morales participated in the 2019 K-1 Flyweight Championship Tournament, facing Kana Morimoto in the semi-finals. Morales lost to the eventual tournament winner by unanimous decision.

Morales is scheduled to defend her ISKA Atomweight title against Simona Di Dio Martello during MFC Showdown 008. Morales won by a unanimous decision.

She was the Kickboxingz.com Female Fighter of the Year for 2019.

Morales faced Anissa Meksen at ONE Championship: Empower on September 3, 2021. She lost the fight by a second-round knockout.

Morales was scheduled to face Supergirl Jaroonsak on August 5, 2023, at ONE Fight Night 13. However, Morales had to withdraw from the bout after announcing her pregnancy and was replaced by Lara Fernandez. The bout was rescheduled on October 7, 2023, at ONE Fight Night 15. However, for undisclosed reasons, the bout was moved for November 4, 2023 at ONE Fight Night 16. She won the fight by a first-round technical knockout.

Morales faced Allycia Rodrigues for the ONE Women's Atomweight Muay Thai World Championship on March 9, 2024, at ONE Fight Night 20. She lost the bout via unanimous decision.

== Championships and accomplishments ==
- Enfusion
  - 2019 Enfusion 52 kg World Championship
- International Sport Kickboxing Association
  - 2019 ISKA Atomweight K1 World Championship
    - Two successful title defenses
- International Professional Combat Council
  - 2021 IPCC Intercontinental -52 kg Championship

=== Awards ===
- 2019 KickboxingZ.com "Female Fighter of the Year"
- 2019 Sports Institute of Seville "Best Female Athlete"

== Fight record ==
Kickboxing record
50 wins (10 KOs), 9 losses
Date	Result	Opponent	Event	Location	Method	Round	Time
2024-03-09	Loss	(Brazil) Allycia Rodrigues	ONE Fight Night 20	Bangkok, Thailand	Decision (Unanimous)	5	3:00
For the ONE Women's Atomweight Muay Thai World Championship.
2023-11-04	Win	(Thailand) Supergirl Jaroonsak	ONE Fight Night 16	Bangkok, Thailand	TKO (Punches)	1	2:54
2021-09-03	Loss	(Algeria) Anissa Meksen	ONE Championship: Empower	Kallang, Singapore	KO (Left hook)	2	2:27
2021-06-19	Win	(Italy) Jleana Valentino		Marbella, Spain	Decision (Unanimous)	5	3:00
Wins the vacant IPCC Intercontinental 52kg title.
2020-08-01	Win	(Italy) Simona Di Dio Martello	MFC Showdown 008	Seville, Spain	Decision (Unanimous)	5	3:00
Defends the ISKA Atomweight K1 title.
2019-12-28	Loss	(Japan) Kana Morimoto	K-1 World GP 2019 Japan: ～Women's Flyweight Championship Tournament～	Nagoya, Japan	Decision (Unanimous)	3	3:00
K1 Flyweight Championship Tournament Semi-finals.
2019-10-26	Win	(Netherlands) Georgina Van Der Linden	Enfusion 89	Wuppertal, Germany	Decision (Split)	5	3:00
Wins the vacant Enfusion World 52 kg title.
2019-09-25	Win	(Belgium) Oumaiima Ahrou	Kryssing World Series	Seville, Spain	Decision (Unanimous)	5	3:00
Defends the ISKA K-1 World Atomweight title.
2019-06-07	Win	(France) Emilie Machut	Enfusion: Ece 1	Tenerife, Spain	Decision (Unanimous)	3	3:00
2019-05-18	Loss	(Italy) Silvia La Notte	Master Fight	Chalon-sur-Saône, France	Decision (Unanimous)	3	3:00
2019-03-30	Win	(France) Fanny Ramos	Ultimate Fight Night 11	Paris, France	KO (High Kick)	3	
Wins the ISKA K-1 World Atomweight title.
2018-10-27	Win	(Spain) Rita Marrero	SLAM Arena 2018	Las Palmas de Gran Canaria, Spain	Decision	3	3:00
2016-10-15	Loss	(China) Wang Xue	Rise of Heroes 2	Zhangshu, China	Decision (Unanimous)	3	3:00
2013-05-04	Win	(Spain) Maria Garcia Espejo	?	Málaga, Spain	Decision (Unanimous)	3	3:00
2012-11-17	Win	(England) Michele Clayton	Heroes IV	Cordoba, Spain	Decision (Unanimous)	3	3:00
2012-11-03	Win	(Netherlands) Samira Hamham	Muay Thai event Bari Gym	Noordwijkerhout, Netherlands	Decision (Unanimous)	3	3:00
2012-06-16	Win	(France) Sylvie Hausseray	Clichy-sous-Bois Boxing Club	Clichy-sous-Bois, France	Decision (Unanimous)	3	3:00
Legend: Win Loss Draw/No contest Notes

Amateur Kickboxing record
Date	Result	Opponent	Event	Location	Method	Round	Time
2024-11-04	Loss	(Israel) Yulia Sachkov	2024 WAKO European Championships, First Round	Athens, Greece	Decision (3:0)	3	2:00
2023-06-30	Loss	(Turkey) Emine Arslan	2023 European Games, Quarterfinals	Myślenice, Poland	Decision (2:1)	3	2:00
2023-03-18	Loss	(Norway) Charlotte Berg Andersen	Austrian Classics Kickboxing World Cup 2023 WAKO, Semifinals	Innsbruck, Austria	Decision (3:0)	3	2:00
2023-03-17	Win	(Italy) Nicole Perona	Austrian Classics Kickboxing World Cup 2023 WAKO, Quarterfinals	Innsbruck, Austria	Decision (3:0)	3	2:00
2022-11-	Loss	(Bulgaria) Alexandra Dimitrova	2022 WAKO European Championships, Quarterfinals	Antalya, Turkey	Decision (3:0)	3	2:00
2022-11-	Win	(Georgia (country)) Elene Loladze	2022 WAKO European Championships, First Round	Antalya, Turkey	Decision (3:0)	3	2:00
2022-06-03	Loss	(Germany) Tatiana Obermeier	27th Hungarian Kickboxing World Cup WAKO, Quarterfinals	Budapest, Hungary	Decision (2:1)	3	2:00
2022-06-02	Win	(Poland) Nicola Kaczmarek	27th Hungarian Kickboxing World Cup WAKO, First Round	Budapest, Hungary	Decision (3:0)	3	2:00
2021-10-18	Loss	(Russia) Polin Petukhova	2021 WAKO World Championships, First Round	Jesolo, Italy	Decision (3:0)	3	2:00
Legend: Win Loss Draw/No contest Notes

== See also ==
- List of female kickboxers
- List of female ISKA champions
