= Ludivine Lasnier =

Spanish kickboxer

- Born: 30 May 1985 (age 41); Troyes, France
- Nationality: French
- Height: 1.60 m (5 ft 3 in)
- Weight: 50 kg (110 lb; 7 st 12 lb)
- Division: Flyweight
- Style: Kickboxing
- Fighting out of: Troyes, France
- Team: Shark Boxing

Kickboxing record
- Total: 40
- Wins: 27
- Losses: 12
- Draws: 1

Other information
- Boxing record from BoxRec

Ludivine Lasnier (born 30 May 1985) is a French kickboxer and the former ISKA World K-1 Flyweight champion.

== Kickboxing career ==
Lasnier faced Audrey Cousey for the ISKA Women's European Full Contact Rules Flyweight title at La nuit des Titans on 31 May 2014. She won the fight by decision.

Lasnier faced Ruqsana Begum for the ISKA Women's World K-1 Rules Flyweight title at World Title Fight on 14 March 2015. She won the fight unanimous decision. She made her first title defense against Sara Falchetti at La Nuit Des Titans on 6 June 2015. She won the fight by unanimous decision as well.

Lasnier faced Daniela Vari in a non-title bout at MFC 2 on 4 July 2015. She won the fight by unanimous decision.

She challenged Silvia La Notte for the WAKO World K-1 Rules Super Flyweight championship at Night Of Si'Fight 1 on 1 December 2018. She lost the unanimous decision.

Lasnier faced Ermira Rexhmati at Fight Night One – Si Fight on 8 October 2022. She won the fight by decision.

== Championships and accomplishments ==
- International Sports Kickboxing Association
  - ISKA Women's World K-1 Rules Flyweight Title
    - One successful title defense
  - ISKA Women's European Full Contact Rules Flyweight title

== Kickboxing record ==
Kickboxing record
27 wins, 11 losses, 1 draw
Date	Result	Opponent	Event	Location	Method	Round	Time
2023-10-14	Draw	(Portugal) Melissa Mendes	Fight Night One – Sifi Fight	Troyes, France	Decision	3	3:00
2022-10-08	Win	(Albania) Ermira Rexhmati	Fight Night One – Si Fight	Troyes, France	Decision	3	3:00
2020-08-29	Loss	(Italy) Gloria Peritore	Road to Lion Fight: Sofokleus vs. Carrara	Rosolini, Italy	Decision (Unanimous)	5	3:00
For the ISKA World Oriental Rules Flyweight title.
2019-12-14	Win	(Portugal) Inês Calado	Night Of Sifight 2	Troyes, France	Decision (Unanimous)	3	3:00
2019-06-22	Win	(France) Juliette Lacroix	C-Fight IX	Cusset, France	Decision (Unanimous)	3	3:00
2018-12-01	Loss	(Italy) Silvia La Notte	Night Of Si'Fight 1	Troyes, France	Decision (Unanimous)	3	3:00
For the WAKO World K1 Super Flyweight title.
2018-10-27	Loss	(Switzerland) Sonia Dihn	Fight Legend	Geneva, Switzerland	TKO (Punches)	3	
2017-11-04	Win	(France) Yolande Alonso	Spirit Boxing Show 2	Nogent-sur-Seine, France	Decision (Unanimous)	5	3:00
2017-06-22	Loss	(France) Fadma Basrir	Triumph Fighting Tour	Paris, France	Decision (Unanimous)	3	3:00
2017-03-25	Loss	(Italy) Silvia La Notte	Meaux Fight VI	Meaux, France	Decision (Unanimous)	3	3:00
2016-10-08	Loss	(Scotland) Amy Pirnie	Yokkao 19 & 20	Bolton, England	TKO (Punches)	2	
2016-05-21	Loss	(Portugal) Maria Lobo	Radikal Fight Night 4	Charleville-Mézières, France	Decision	3	3:00
2016-03-05	Loss	(France) Soraya Bucherie	Le Choc des Légendes	Saint Ouen, France	Decision	3	3:00
2015-07-04	Win	(Italy) Daniela Vari	MFC 2	Lons-le-Saunier, France	Decision (Unanimous)	3	3:00
2015-06-06	Win	(Italy) Sara Falchetti	La Nuit Des Titans	Saint-André-les-Vergers, France	Decision (Unanimous)	3	3:00
Defends the ISKA World K-1 Rules Flyweight title.
2015-03-14	Win	(United Kingdom) Ruqsana Begum	World Title Fight	London, England	Decision (Unanimous)	3	3:00
Wins the ISKA World K-1 Rules Flyweight title.
2014-05-31	Win	(France) Audrey Cousey	La nuit des Titans	Saint-André-les-Vergers, France	Decision (Unanimous)	3	3:00
Wins the ISKA European Full Contact Rules Flyweight title.
Legend: Win Loss Draw/No contest Notes

== See also ==
- List of female kickboxers
- List of female ISKA champions
