= Kim Townsend =

Australian kickboxer

- Born: 1988 (age 37–38); Perth, Western Australia
- Nickname: Lil K
- Height: 1.60 m (5 ft 3 in)
- Weight: 48 kg (106 lb; 7 st 8 lb)
- Division: Atomweight; Flyweight; Super Flyweight
- Style: Muay Thai
- Fighting out of: Brisbane , Queensland
- Team: Muay Thai Mulisha
- Trainer: Chris Johnstone
- Years active: 2010 - present

Kickboxing record
- Total: 55
- Wins: 45
- Losses: 9
- Draws: 1

Kim Townsend is an Australian kickboxer, Nak Muay, and the current ISKA Flyweight World Champion and WMO Light Flyweight World Muay Thai champion. She is the former WMC Oceania and WKN Australia Flyweight champion.

== Kickboxing career ==
Kim Townsend participated in the 2012 S-Cup tournament. She lost a unanimous decision to Rena Kubota in the quarter-finals.

During Epic FP 11, she fought against Nuengsian Sitpolek and won a unanimous decision.

Townsend challenged the Krush Women's Flyweight champion Kana Morimoto at Krush 88 on May 17, 2018. She lost the fight by unanimous decision, after an extra fourth round was contested.

Townsend faced Celest Hansen for the vacant WBC Muay Thai Light-flyweight World title at MTL 3 "A League of Their Own on April 9, 2022. She won the fight by unanimous decision.

Townsend faced Lisa Brierley for the vacant WBC Muay Thai Flyweight World title at 1774 Muay Thai Series - Nations Collide on May 14, 2022. She won the fight by unanimous decision.

Townsend faced Namwhan Sor Kongkraphan for the vacant WMC Light-flyweight World title at Costal Warfare 24 on March 25, 2023. She won the fight by a third-round technical knockout.

Townsend faced Saya Ito for the vacant WBC Muay Thai Diamond Light-flyweight World title at RISE Championship on May 6, 2023. She won the fight by decision.

== Championships and accomplishments ==
- International Sport Karate Association
  - 2019 ISKA World Muaythai Flyweight Champion
    - One successful title defense
- Destiny Muay Thai
  - 2018 Destiny Muay Thai Flyweight Champion
    - One successful title defense
- World Muaythai Council
  - 2015 WMC Oceania Flyweight Champion
  - 2023 WMC World Light-flyweight Champion
    - One successful title defense
- World Boxing Council Muay Thai
  - 2018 WBC Muay Thai Australia Flyweight Champion
  - 2022 WBC Muay Thai Australia Super-flyweight Champion
  - 2022 WBC Muay Thai World Light-flyweight Champion
    - Three successful title defenses
  - 2022 WBC Muay Thai World Flyweight Champion
  - 2023 WBC Muay Thai Diamond Light-flyweight Champion
- World Muaythai Organization
  - 2019 WMO Pro-Am World Champion
  - 2024 WMO World Light Flyweight (108 lbs) Champion
    - One successful title defense
  - 2024 WMO Female Fighter of the Year
- World Kun Khmer Federation
  - 2024 WKKF 52kg Champion
- World Kickboxing Network
  - WKN Australia Flyweight Champion

== Fight record ==
Muay Thai and Kickboxing record
45 wins, 9 losses, 1 draw
Date	Result	Opponent	Event	Location	Method	Round	Time
2026-10-23		(Singapore) Winnia Leow	DreamStage Championship	Hong Kong			
Defending the WMO World Light Flyweight (108 lbs) title.
2026-06-30	Win	(Switzerland) Aline Seiberth	WBC Muay Thai, Rajadamnern Stadium	Bangkok, Thailand	Decision (Unanimous)	5	3:00
Defends the WBC Muay Thai World Light Flyweight (108 lbs) title.
2026-03-07	Win	(United Kingdom) Shannon Kelly	Destiny Muay Thai 30	Brisbane, Australia	Decision (Unanimous)	5	3:00
Defends the WBC Muay Thai World Light Flyweight (108 lbs) title.
2026-02-07	Win	(Switzerland) Clementine Egg	GVA Fight Night	Geneva, Switzerland	Decision (Unanimous)	5	3:00
Defends the WMC Light-flyweight World title.
2025-10-10	Loss	(Thailand) Duangdawnoi Looksakongdin	ONE Friday Fights 128, Lumpinee Stadium	Bangkok, Thailand	Decision (Unanimous)	3	3:00
2025-08-16	Win	(Spain) Eider Bernaola	Powerhouse Fight Series XIV	Queensland, Australia	TKO (arm injury)	4	
Defends the WMO World Light Flyweight (108 lbs) title.
2025-04-12	Win	(Singapore) Winnia Jieen	Honour Premier League	Brisbane, Australia	Decision (Unanimous)	5	3:00
Defends the ISKA Muay Thai Flyweight World Title.
2024-12-14	Win	(Cambodia) Touch Chanvotey	Kun Khmer Super Fight x Best of the Best	Bonnyrigg, Australia	KO (Low kicks)	3	
Wins the vacant World Kun Khmer Federation 52kg title.
2024-09-13	Win	(Canada) Regan Gowing	Warrior's Cup 64	New York City, USA	Decision (Unanimous)	5	3:00
Defends the WBC Muay Thai Light-flyweight World title.
2024-06-29	Win	(Thailand) Narak Looknongsaeng	War on the Shore 24	Gold Coast, Australia	KO (Low kicks)	3	
Wins the vacant WMO World Light Flyweight (108 lbs) title.
2023-05-06	Win	(Japan) Saya Ito	RISE Championship	Brisbane, Australia	Decision	5	3:00
Wins the WBC Muay Thai Diamond Light-flyweight World title.
2023-03-25	Win	(Thailand) Namwhan Sor Kongkraphan	Costal Warfare 24	Gold Coast, Australia	TKO (Elbows)	3	2:53
Wins the vacant WMC Light-flyweight World title.
2022-05-14	Win	(United Kingdom) Lisa Brierley	1774 Muay Thai Series - Nations Collide	Sydney, Australia	Decision (Unanimous)	5	2:00
Wins the vacant WBC Muay Thai Flyweight World title.
2022-04-09	Win	(Australia) Celest Hansen	MTL 3 "A League of Their Own	Gold Coast, Australia	Decision (Unanimous)	5	2:00
Wins the vacant WBC Muay Thai Light-flyweight World title.
2022-02-12	Win	(Australia) Soraya Hamami	1774 Muay Thai Series	City of Shellharbour, Australia	Decision (Unanimous)	5	2:00
Wins the WBC Muay Thai Super-flyweight Australian title.
2020-04-11	Win	(Australia) Emma Graham	Nemesis 11	Perth, Australia	Decision (Unanimous)	5	2:00
2020-02-15	Win	(Australia) Rachael Kavanagh	Knees of Fury 80	Perth, Australia	Decision (Split)	5	2:00
For the Commonwealth Muaythai Flyweight Title.
2019-11-30	Win	(Australia) Soraya Hamami	Rebellion Muaythai 23	St Kilda, Victoria, Australia	Decision (Unanimous)	5	3:00
2019-06-01	Win	(Australia) Nyrene Crowley	Total Kaos 3	Brisbane, Australia	Decision (Unanimous)	5	2:00
Wins the ISKA Muay Thai Flyweight World Title.
2019-04-13	Win	(Australia) Marina Verissimo	Destiny Muay Thai 12	Perth, Australia	Decision (Unanimous)	5	2:00
Defended the Destiny Muay Thai Flyweight Title.
2019-03-02	Win	(United Kingdom) Grace Spicer	Ignite the Fight 26	Brisbane, Australia			
2018-10-27	Win	(Australia) Kiri Bradley	Destiny Muay Thai 11	Brisbane, Australia	Decision (Unanimous)	5	2:00
Wins the Destiny Muay Thai Flyweight Title.
2018-05-17	Loss	(Japan) Kana Morimoto	Krush 88	Tokyo, Japan	Ext. R. Decision (Unanimous)	4	3:00
For the Krush Women's Flyweight title.
2018-04-07	Win	(Australia) Kimberly Law	Destiny Muay Thai	Australia	Decision (Unanimous)	5	2:00
For the WBC Muaythai Australia Flyweight Title.
2018-03-10	Win	(Australia) Kiri Bradley	Elite Fight Series	Brisbane, Australia	Decision	5	2:00
2017-11-04	Win	(Australia) Sarah Carl	TAG Team Championship	Australia			
2016-12-17	Win	(Thailand) Duagndaonoi Looksaikongdin	World Fight Australia	Canberra, Australia	Decision (Split)	3	3:00
2016-07-09	Loss	(Thailand) Loma Lookboonmee	Epic Fight Promotions 15: Pride	Perth, Australia	Decision (Unanimous)	5	2:00
2016-06-24	Loss	(New Zealand) Michelle Preston		Auckland, New Zealand	Decision	3	3:00
2016-05-22	Loss	(Australia) Emma Graham	Nemesis XI	Perth, Australia	Decision	5	2:00
2016-02-12	Win	(Thailand) Petchbenja Onesongchaigym	CDL Boxing Promotions	Australia	Decision	5	2:00
2015-10-11	Win	(New Zealand) Michelle Preston	Epic Fight Promotions 14	Perth, Australia	Decision (Unanimous)	5	2:00
Wins the WMC Oceania Title.
2015-03-28	Win	(Thailand) Nong Em Tor Vittaya	Epic Fight Promotions 13	Perth, Australia	Decision (Unanimous)	5	2:00
2015-02-27	Win	(Australia) Natalie Edwards	Brute Force 3	Melbourne, Australia	Decision (Split)	5	2:00
2014-10-12	Win	(Australia) Tali Silbermann	Epic Fight Promotions 12	Perth, Australia	Decision (Unanimous)	5	2:00
2014-07-10	Win	(Thailand) Nuengsian Sitpolek	Epic Fight Promotions 11	Perth, Australia	Decision (Unanimous)	5	2:00
2012-08-25	Loss	(Japan) Rena Kubota	Shoot Boxing Girls S-Cup	Tokyo, Japan	Decision (Unanimous)	3	2:00
2012 S-Cup Quarter finals.
2011-10-15	Loss	(Australia) Kaitlyn Vance	Epic Fight Promotions 4	Perth, Australia	Decision (Split)	5	2:00
For the WMC Flyweight state title.
Legend: Win Loss Draw/No contest Notes

== See also ==
- List of female kickboxers
- List of female ISKA champions
