= Emilie Machut =

French kickboxer

- Born: 13 January 1997 (age 29); Saint-Quentin, France
- Nationality: French
- Height: 1.60 m (5 ft 3 in)
- Weight: 49 kg (108 lb; 7 st 10 lb)
- Division: Atomweight; Flyweight
- Style: Kickboxing
- Fighting out of: Tergnier, France
- Team: Team Lamouret
- Years active: 2016 - present

Kickboxing record
- Total: 12
- Wins: 9
- By knockout: 2
- Losses: 3
- By knockout: 1

Emilie Machut (born 13 January 1997) is a French kickboxer. A professional competitor since 2016, she is the former ISKA World and European Full Contact Atomweight champion.

== Kickboxing career ==
Machut made her professional debut against Debora Varcica at Fight Stadium on 7 May 2016, for the ISKA European title. She won the fight by unanimous decision.

In her next fight, Emilie Machut was scheduled to face Yanira Martin at Fight Stadium on 11 March 2017, for the ISKA World Atomweight Full Contact title. She won the fight by unanimous decision.

Machut was scheduled to face the K-1 Krush flyweight champion Kana Morimoto at Krush 79 on 20 August 2017. Machut suffered her first career knockout loss, after being knocked out by a left hook in the first round.

Machut was scheduled to fight Francesca Bartolini at Fight Stadium III on 3 March 2018. Machut won the fight by a unanimous decision.

Machut next faced Whitney Shepard at Whitney Shepard on 29 September 2018. Machut won the fight by a unanimous decision.

Machut was scheduled to face Silvia Mezzolato at Fight Stadium IV, on 9 March 2019. The fight was a unanimous decision.

During Enfusion: Ece 1 Machut faced the ISKA Atomweight K1 and future Enfusion 52 kg champion Cristina Morales. Morales won the fight a unanimous decision.

Machut was scheduled to face Marine Mazeau at The Stars Of Thai Boxing VI on 25 January 2020. Machut won the fight by a unanimous decision.

Machut was booked to defend her ISKA World title against Simona Di Dio Martello at GFCT 6 on 27 June 2021. She lost the fight by unanimous decision.

Machut was scheduled to face Aleksandra Madraszewska at K-1 French Tour on 18 December 2021. The bout was later cancelled for undisclosed reasons. Machut was booked to face Dimitra Agathangelidou at Bacho Cup on 23 April 2022. She won the fight by decision.

Machut faced Beatrice Insola at Evolution Fight on 30 July 2022. She won the fight by a second-round knockout.

Machut faced Adrianna Jedraczka at Fight of Clovis on 10 December 2022.

== Championships and accomplishments ==
- International Sport Karate Association
  - ISKA European Full Contact Atomweight Championship
  - ISKA World K-1 Atomweight Championship

== Kickboxing record ==
Kickboxing record
9 Wins (2 (T)KO's), 3 Losses
Date	Result	Opponent	Event	Location	Method	Round	Time
2022-12-10	Win	(Poland) Adrianna Jedraczka	Fight au Clovis	Soissons, France	KO (Body kick)	1	
2022-07-30	Win	(Italy) Beatrice Insola	Evolution Fight XIX	Syracuse, Sicily	KO	2	
2022-04-23	Win	(Greece) Dimitra Agathangelidou	Bancho Cup	Thurins, France	Decision	3	3:00
2021-06-27	Loss	(Italy) Simona Di Dio Martello	GFCT 6	Saint-Martin-en-Haut, France	Decision (Unanimous)	5	3:00
For the ISKA World Atomweight Full Contact title.
2020-01-25	Win	(France) Marine Mazeau	The Stars Of Thai Boxing VI	Marcq-en-Barœul, France	Decision (Unanimous)	3	3:00
2019-06-07	Loss	(Spain) Cristina Morales	Enfusion: Ece 1	Tenerife, Spain	Decision (Unanimous)	3	3:00
2019-03-09	Win	(Italy) Silvia Pezzolato	Fight Stadium IV	Tergnier, France	Decision (Unanimous)	3	3:00
2018-09-29	Win	(Republic of Ireland) Whitney Shepard	White Collar Boxing	Galway, Ireland	Decision (Unanimous)	3	3:00
2018-03-03	Win	(France) Francesca Bartolini	Fight Stadium III	France	Decision (Unanimous)	3	3:00
2017-08-20	Loss	(Japan) Kana Morimoto	Krush 79	Tokyo, Japan	KO (Punch)	1	1:55
2017-03-11	Win	(Spain) Yanira Martin	Fight Stadium II	Tergnier, France	Decision (Unanimous)	5	3:00
Wins the ISKA World Atomweight K-1 title.
2016-05-07	Win	(Italy) Debora Varcica	Fight Stadium I	Tergnier, France	Decision (Unanimous)	5	3:00
Wins the ISKA European Atomweight Full Contact title.
Legend: Win Loss Draw/No contest Notes

== See also ==
- List of female kickboxers
- List of female ISKA champions
