= 2018 IFMA World Muaythai Championships =

2018 World Muaythai Championships
- Venue: Boulevard Kukulcan Lt45-47
- Location: Cancún, Mexico
- Start date: 10 May
- End date: 19 May
- Competitors: 404 from 77 nations

Champions
- Team: Russia

The 2018 IFMA World Muaythai Championships is the 17th edition of the IFMA World Muaythai Championships. The competition are held from May 10 to May 19, 2018, in Cancún, Mexico.

== Medal table ==
=== Overall ===
* Host nation (Mexico)

Rank	Nation	Gold	Silver	Bronze	Total
1	Russia (RUS)	11	7	4	22
2	Thailand (THA)	5	2	1	8
3	Ukraine (UKR)	4	1	2	7
4	Sweden (SWE)	2	3	4	9
5	Belarus (BLR)	2	3	3	8
6	Peru (PER)	2	1	1	4
7	China (CHN)	2	0	0	2
8	Mexico (MEX)*	1	2	7	10
9	Turkey (TUR)	1	1	10	12
10	Philippines (PHI)	1	1	2	4
11	United Arab Emirates (UAE)	1	1	1	3
12	Italy (ITA)	1	0	2	3
12	United States (USA)	1	0	2	3
14	Israel (ISR)	1	0	1	2
15	Croatia (CRO)	1	0	0	1
15	Poland (POL)	1	0	0	1
17	Australia (AUS)	0	2	0	2
17	Vietnam (VIE)	0	2	0	2
19	Kazakhstan (KAZ)	0	1	6	7
20	France (FRA)	0	1	4	5
21	Great Britain (GBR)	0	1	3	4
22	Canada (CAN)	0	1	2	3
22	Hungary (HUN)	0	1	2	3
24	Hong Kong (HKG)	0	1	1	2
24	Macedonia	0	1	1	2
26	Brazil (BRA)	0	1	0	1
26	Bulgaria (BUL)	0	1	0	1
26	Estonia (EST)	0	1	0	1
26	South Korea (KOR)	0	1	0	1
30	Argentina (ARG)	0	0	2	2
31	Chinese Taipei (TPE)	0	0	1	1
31	Colombia (COL)	0	0	1	1
31	Czech Republic (CZE)	0	0	1	1
31	Dominica (DMA)	0	0	1	1
31	Finland (FIN)	0	0	1	1
31	French Polynesia (PYF)	0	0	1	1
31	Germany (GER)	0	0	1	1
31	Honduras (HON)	0	0	1	1
31	Malaysia (MAS)	0	0	1	1
31	New Zealand (NZL)	0	0	1	1
31	Paraguay (PAR)	0	0	1	1
31	Trinidad and Tobago (TTO)	0	0	1	1
Totals (42 entries)		37	37	73	147

=== Elite A ===
* Host nation (Mexico)

Rank	Nation	Gold	Silver	Bronze	Total
1	Russia (RUS)	6	7	4	17
2	Thailand (THA)	5	2	1	8
3	Ukraine (UKR)	4	1	2	7
4	Belarus (BLR)	2	3	3	8
4	Sweden (SWE)	2	3	3	8
6	Turkey (TUR)	1	1	10	12
7	Italy (ITA)	1	0	2	3
8	Croatia (CRO)	1	0	0	1
8	Israel (ISR)	1	0	0	1
8	Poland (POL)	1	0	0	1
11	Kazakhstan (KAZ)	0	1	6	7
12	France (FRA)	0	1	3	4
12	Mexico (MEX)*	0	1	3	4
14	Canada (CAN)	0	1	1	2
15	Australia (AUS)	0	1	0	1
15	Hungary (HUN)	0	1	0	1
15	Vietnam (VIE)	0	1	0	1
18	Great Britain (GBR)	0	0	3	3
19	Chinese Taipei (TPE)	0	0	1	1
19	Colombia (COL)	0	0	1	1
19	Dominica (DMA)	0	0	1	1
19	Finland (FIN)	0	0	1	1
19	New Zealand (NZL)	0	0	1	1
19	Paraguay (PAR)	0	0	1	1
19	Peru (PER)	0	0	1	1
19	Trinidad and Tobago (TTO)	0	0	1	1
19	United States (USA)	0	0	1	1
Totals (27 entries)		24	24	50	98

=== Competitive B ===
* Host nation (Mexico)

Rank	Nation	Gold	Silver	Bronze	Total
1	Russia (RUS)	5	0	0	5
2	Peru (PER)	2	1	0	3
3	China (CHN)	2	0	0	2
4	Mexico (MEX)*	1	1	4	6
5	Philippines (PHI)	1	1	2	4
6	United Arab Emirates (UAE)	1	1	1	3
7	United States (USA)	1	0	1	2
8	Great Britain (GBR)	0	1	2	3
9	Hong Kong (HKG)	0	1	1	2
9	Macedonia	0	1	1	2
11	Australia (AUS)	0	1	0	1
11	Brazil (BRA)	0	1	0	1
11	Bulgaria (BUL)	0	1	0	1
11	Estonia (EST)	0	1	0	1
11	South Korea (KOR)	0	1	0	1
11	Vietnam (VIE)	0	1	0	1
17	Argentina (ARG)	0	0	2	2
17	Hungary (HUN)	0	0	2	2
19	Canada (CAN)	0	0	1	1
19	Chinese Taipei (TPE)	0	0	1	1
19	Czech Republic (CZE)	0	0	1	1
19	France (FRA)	0	0	1	1
19	French Polynesia (PYF)	0	0	1	1
19	Germany (GER)	0	0	1	1
19	Honduras (HON)	0	0	1	1
19	Israel (ISR)	0	0	1	1
19	Malaysia (MAS)	0	0	1	1
19	Sweden (SWE)	0	0	1	1
Totals (28 entries)		13	13	26	52

== Medalists ==
=== Men's events ===
Event	Gold	Silver	Bronze
−48 kg	Aphichet Nakkaeo; Thailand	Ovsep Aslanyan; Russia	Zubeyr Barin; Turkey
−48 kg	Aphichet Nakkaeo; Thailand	Ovsep Aslanyan; Russia	Bakytzhan Arifkhanov; Kazakhstan
−51 kg	Arnon Phonkrathok; Thailand	Yelaman Sayassatov; Kazakhstan	Charak Murtuzaliev; Russia
−51 kg	Arnon Phonkrathok; Thailand	Yelaman Sayassatov; Kazakhstan	Fabia Fortaleza; Trinidad and Tobago
−54 kg	Kholmurod Rakhimov; Russia	Mikalai Sviadomski; Belarus	Sercan Koc; Turkey
−54 kg	Kholmurod Rakhimov; Russia	Mikalai Sviadomski; Belarus	Chotichanin Kokkrachai; Thailand
−57 kg	Wiwat Khamtha; Thailand	Vladyslav Mykytas; Uzbekistan	Almaz Sarsembekov; Kazakhstan
−57 kg	Wiwat Khamtha; Thailand	Vladyslav Mykytas; Uzbekistan	Osvaldo Rangel Chávez; Mexico
−60 kg	Aik Begia; Russia	Prawit Chilnak; Thailand	Filiph Waldt; Sweden
−60 kg	Aik Begia; Russia	Prawit Chilnak; Thailand	Ishan Galiyev; Turkey
−63.5 kg	Igor Liubchenko; Ukraine	Abdulmalik Mugidinov; Russia	Mathias Jonsson; Sweden
−63.5 kg	Igor Liubchenko; Ukraine	Abdulmalik Mugidinov; Russia	Serdar Koc; Turkey
−67 kg	Dzimitry Varats; Belarus	Spéth Norbert Attila; Hungary	Furkan Semih Karabag; Turkey
−67 kg	Dzimitry Varats; Belarus	Spéth Norbert Attila; Hungary	Zhanibek Kanatbayev; Kazakhstan
−71 kg	Komsan Tantakhob; Thailand	Andrei Kulebin; Belarus	Yildirim Oguz; Turkey
−71 kg	Komsan Tantakhob; Thailand	Andrei Kulebin; Belarus	Namik Neftaliyev; Kazakhstan
−75 kg	Vasyl Sorokin; Ukraine	Yauhen Lasheuski; Belarus	Vadim Loparev; Kazakhstan
−75 kg	Vasyl Sorokin; Ukraine	Yauhen Lasheuski; Belarus	Enrico Carrara; Italy
−81 kg	Ali Dogan; Turkey	Constantino Nanga; Sweden	Anatolii Sukhanov; Ukraine
−81 kg	Ali Dogan; Turkey	Constantino Nanga; Sweden	Ivan Valenzuela Molina; Mexico
−86 kg	Lukasz Radosz; Poland	Armen Petrosian; Russia	Serdar Yigit Eroglu; Turkey
−86 kg	Lukasz Radosz; Poland	Armen Petrosian; Russia	Timothy Lo; Canada
−91 kg	Oleh Pryimachov; Ukraine	Gadzhi Medzhidov; Russia	Raffaele Vitale; Italy
−91 kg	Oleh Pryimachov; Ukraine	Gadzhi Medzhidov; Russia	Miguel Fuerte; Dominica
+91 kg	Tsotne Rogava; Ukraine	Kirill Kornilov; Russia	Bugra Erdogan; Turkey
+91 kg	Tsotne Rogava; Ukraine	Kirill Kornilov; Russia	Amine Kebir; France

=== Women's events ===
Event	Gold	Silver	Bronze
−45 kg	Alena Liashkevich; Belarus	Paola Jacqueline Gonzalez; Mexico	Satu Mykkänen; Finland
−45 kg	Alena Liashkevich; Belarus	Paola Jacqueline Gonzalez; Mexico	Vera Negodina; Russia
−48 kg	Suphisara Konlak; Thailand	Vera Buga; Russia	Myriame Djedidi; France
−48 kg	Suphisara Konlak; Thailand	Vera Buga; Russia	Leigh Newton; Great Britain
−51 kg	Josefine Lindgren Knutsson; Sweden	Bùi Yến Ly; Vietnam	Juliette Lacroix; France
−51 kg	Josefine Lindgren Knutsson; Sweden	Bùi Yến Ly; Vietnam	Paula Benavides; Peru
−54 kg	Sofia Olofsson; Sweden	Yadrung Tehiran; Thailand	Maria Lobo; Portugal
−54 kg	Sofia Olofsson; Sweden	Yadrung Tehiran; Thailand	Olena Ovchynnikova; Ukraine
−57 kg	Martine Michieletto; Italy	Anaelle Angerville; France	Patricia Axling; Sweden
−57 kg	Martine Michieletto; Italy	Anaelle Angerville; France	Maria Klimova; Russia
−60 kg	Nili Block; Israel	Ekaterina Vinnikova; Russia	Mariya Valent; Belarus
−60 kg	Nili Block; Israel	Ekaterina Vinnikova; Russia	Mariana Ramirez Sanchez; Mexico
−63.5 kg	Svetlana Vinnikova; Russia	Erica Björnestrand; Sweden	Kubra Akbulut; Turkey
−63.5 kg	Svetlana Vinnikova; Russia	Erica Björnestrand; Sweden	Sabina Mazo; Colombia
−67 kg	Anastasiia Nepianidi; Russia	Zoe Putorak; Australia	Bediha Tacyildiz; Turkey
−67 kg	Anastasiia Nepianidi; Russia	Zoe Putorak; Australia	Angela Whitley; United States
−71 kg	Helena Jurisic; Croatia	Angela Mamic; Sweden	Tugce Akkus; Turkey
−71 kg	Helena Jurisic; Croatia	Angela Mamic; Sweden	Ekaterina Bezhan; Russia
−75 kg	Irina Larionova; Russia	Sarah Carter; Canada	Maryia Belush; Belarus
−75 kg	Irina Larionova; Russia	Sarah Carter; Canada	Moana Rangitira; New Zealand
+75 kg	Viktoriia Zhbankova; Russia	Mensure Karadayi; Turkey	Dziyana Yemialyanava; Belarus
+75 kg	Viktoriia Zhbankova; Russia	Mensure Karadayi; Turkey	Juanita Esperosa; Paraguay

== Participating nations ==
A total of 404 athletes from 77 nations competed.

- Afghanistan (2)
- Algeria (1)
- Argentina (9)
- Australia (10)
- Austria (1)
- Belarus (12)
- Bolivia (2)
- Brazil (5)
- Bulgaria (2)
- Cameroon (1)
- Canada (15)
- Czech Republic (5)
- Chile (1)
- China (8)
- Chinese Taipei (3)
- Colombia (6)
- Costa Rica (2)
- Croatia (3)
- Cyprus (2)
- Denmark (1)
- Dominica (1)
- Ecuador (3)
- Estonia (3)
- Finland (10)
- France (9)
- French Polynesia (2)
- Germany (5)
- United Kingdom (4)
- Greece (1)
- Honduras (5)
- Hong Kong (3)
- Hungary (5)
- India (1)
- Israel (5)
- Italy (7)
- Japan (1)
- Kazakhstan (14)
- Kyrgyzstan (2)
- Lithuania (2)
- Macau (4)
- Macedonia (3)
- Malaysia (1)
- Mauritius (1)
- Mexico (25)
- Morocco (2)
- Nepal (1)
- Netherlands (1)
- New Zealand (1)
- Pakistan (4)
- Paraguay (1)
- Peru (14)
- Philippines (5)
- Portugal (4)
- Poland (5)
- Russia (29)
- Singapore (5)
- Slovakia (3)
- South Africa (1)
- South Korea (1)
- Spain (5)
- Sri Lanka (1)
- Sweden (19)
- Tajikistan (1)
- Thailand (11)
- Trinidad and Tobago (1)
- Turkey (22)
- Turkmenistan (1)
- Ukraine (17)
- United Arab Emirates (5)
- United States (24)
- Uruguay (2)
- Uzbekistan (1)
- Vietnam (8)
