= Gloria Peritore =

Italian female kickboxer

- Born: 29 November 1988 (age 37); Licata, Italy
- Nickname: "Shadow"
- Nationality: Italian
- Height: 1.62 m (5 ft 4 in)
- Weight: 52 kg (115 lb; 8 st 3 lb)
- Division: Flyweight
- Style: Kickboxing
- Fighting out of: Rome, Italy
- Team: Raini Clan
- Trainer: Manuele Raini
- Years active: 2013 - present

Professional boxing record
- Total: 6
- Wins: 5
- By knockout: 3
- Draws: 1

Kickboxing record
- Total: 27
- Wins: 19
- By knockout: 2
- Losses: 7
- By knockout: 1
- Draws: 1

Mixed martial arts record
- Total: 2
- Wins: 1
- By submission: 1
- Losses: 1
- By knockout: 1

Other information
- Website: https://www.gloriaperitore.com/
- Boxing record from BoxRec
- Mixed martial arts record from Sherdog

Gloria Peritore (born 29 November 1988) is an Italian kickboxer, boxer and mixed martial artist. She is the current ISKA World Flyweight Kickboxing and Oriental Rules champion. In October 2022, she was ranked as the tenth best pound-for-pound women's kickboxer in the world by Beyond Kick.

== Mixed martial arts career ==
Peritore made her mixed martial arts debut against Claudia Archir at Luctor Cage Fight - Luctor 2017 on 8 July 2017. She won the fight by a first-round submission.

Peritore faced Giulia Chinello at Fight1 - Iron Fighter 20 on 10 November 2018, fifteen months after her previous fight. She lost the bout by a first-round technical knockout.

== Kickboxing career ==
=== Early career ===
Peritore made her professional debut in early 2013. She amassed an 8-0 record during the next two years, most notably beating Marzia Vadalà by unanimous decision twice.

Her undefeated streak earned Peritore the chance to challenge the ISKA European Full Contact Kickboxing Flyweight champion Lizzie Largillière at La Nuit de l'Impact on 16 May 2015. She lost the fight by split decision.

=== Bellator Kickboxing ===
Peritore made her professional debut with Bellator Kickboxing against Li Mingrui at Bellator Kickboxing 1 on 16 April 2016. She won the fight by a third-round technical knockout.

Following a split decision loss to Jleana Valentino at La Notte dei Campioni on 14 May 2016, Peritore was scheduled to face the former Enfusion champion Denise Kielholtz at Bellator 157 on 24 June 2016. She won the fight by split decision.

Due to the close nature of their first meeting, an immediate rematch between Peritore and Denise Kielholtz was booked for Bellator 168 on 10 December 2016. Kielholtz was more successful in their second meeting, as she won the bout by split decision.

Pertiore's next fight took place outside of Bellator, as she faced the pound for pound queen Anissa Meksen at La Nuit De L'Impact III on 20 May 2017. She suffered her fourth professional loss, as Meksen won the bout by unanimous decision.

Peritore faced Lara Fernandez at War of Titans on 23 September 2017. She won the fight by unanimous decision.

Peritore faced Lizzie Largillière in a rematch at Bellator 190 on 9 December 2017. She won the fight by unanimous decision.

Peritore faced Martine Michieletto at Bellator 203 on 14 July 2018, in her fifth and final appearance with the promotion. She lost the fight by unanimous decision.

Peritore returned from an almost year-long absence in order to face Ilaria Pizzuti at Fight Clubbing on 4 May 2019. She won the fight by a second-round technical knockout. After beating Eleni Katsimicha by unanimous decision on 23 October 2019, Peritore was booked to face the K-1 Women's Flyweight champion Kana Morimoto in a non-title bout at K'Festa 3 on 22 March 2020. She lost the fight by a first-round knockout, after being dropped with a right hook with 18 seconds left in the round.

=== ISKA Oriental flyweight champion ===
Peritore challenged for the ISKA World Oriental Rules title at Road to Lion Fight: Sofokleus vs. Carrara in August 2020, which was held at the time by Ludivine Lasnier. Peritore won the title by a unanimous decision.

She was scheduled to fight Sonia Dinh at The Arena 3 on 27 March 2021. Peritore won the fight by unanimous decision.

Peritore was booked to face Mariza Korogiannou for the WKU FCR 55 kg title at The Arena: No Surrender on 26 March 2022. She won the fight by unanimous decision.

Peritore made her first ISKA World Oriental Rules title defense against Mireia García at Superfights II on 17 June 2022. She retained the title, as the fight was ruled a draw.

== Professional boxing career ==
Peritore made her professional boxing debut, as a bantamweight, against Chiara Insarrualde on March 24, 2023, at the Allianz Cloud Arena in Milan, Italy. She won the four round contest on points.

Peritore faced the unbeaten Giacoma Cordio on May 5, 2023. The bout ended in a split decision draw.

Peritore faced Antonina Cuti on October 13, 2023. She won the fight on points.

== Championships and accomplishments ==
=== Professional ===
- Italian Kickboxing Federation
  - 2015 Italian National Kickboxing Championship
  - 2016 Slam 4 Women Flyweight Tournament Winner
- International Sport Karate Association
  - 2020 ISKA World Oriental Rules Flyweight Championship
    - One successful title defense
- World Kickboxing and Karate Union
  - 2021 WKU FCR World -55 kg Championship
  - 2021 ISKA World Oriental Rules Flyweight Championship

=== Amateur ===
- IAKSA
  - 2012 Italian National Amateur Kickboxing Championship
- World Traditional Kickboxing Association
  - 2012 WTKA Amateur World Kickboxing Championship
- International Sport Karate Association
  - 2013 ISKA Amateur World K1 Championship
  - 2014 ISKA Amateur World Kickboxing Championship

== Kickboxing record ==
Professional Kickboxing Record
19 Wins (2 (T)KO's), 7 Losses, 1 Draw, 0 No Contest
Date	Result	Opponent	Event	Location	Method	Round	Time
2022-06-17	Draw	(Spain) Mireia García	Superfights II	Rome, Italy	Decision (Unanimous)	5	3:00
Defends the ISKA World Flyweight Oriental Rules title.
2022-03-26	Win	(Greece) Mariza Korogiannou	The Arena: No Surrender	Milan, Italy	Decision (Unanimous)	5	3:00
Wins the WKU FCR -55kg title.
2021-03-27	Win	(Switzerland) Sonia Dinh	The Arena 3	Pescara, Italy	Decision (Unanimous)	3	3:00
2020-08-29	Win	(France) Ludivine Lasnier	Road to Lion Fight: Sofokleus vs. Carrara	Rosolini, Italy	Decision (Unanimous)	5	3:00
Wins the ISKA World Flyweight Oriental Rules title.
2020-03-22	Loss	(Japan) Kana Morimoto	K-1: K'Festa 3	Tokyo, Japan	KO (Right hook)	1	2:42
2019-10-23	Win	(Greece) Eleni Katsimicha	Night of Siam	Pisa, Italy	Decision (Unanimous)	3	3:00
2019-05-04	Win	(Italy) Ilaria Pizzuti	Fight Clubbing	Pescara, Italy	TKO	2	1:29
2018-07-14	Loss	(Italy) Martine Michieletto	Bellator 203	Rome, Italy	Decision (Unanimous)	3	3:00
2017-12-09	Win	(France) Lizzie Largillière	Bellator 190	Florence, Italy	Decision (Unanimous)	3	3:00
2017-09-23	Win	(Spain) Lara Fernandez	War Of Titans	Barcelona, Spain	Decision (Unanimous)	5	3:00
2017-05-20	Loss	(France) Anissa Meksen	La Nuit De L'Impact III	Saintes, France	Decision (Unanimous)	3	3:00
2016-12-10	Loss	(Netherlands) Denise Kielholtz	Bellator 168	Florence, Italy	Decision (Split)	3	3:00
For The Bellator Flyweight Title.
2016-06-24	Win	(Netherlands) Denise Kielholtz	Bellator 157	St.Louis, Missouri	Decision (Split)	3	3:00
2016-05-14	Loss	(Italy) Jleana Valentino	La Notte dei Campioni	Seregno, Italy	Decision (Split)	3	3:00
2016-04-16	Win	(China) Li Mingrui	Bellator Kickboxing 1	Torino, Italy	TKO (Punches)	3	
2016-03-16	Win	(Italy) Marzia Vadalà	Muay Thai Time: Iron Fight, Tournament Finals	Genoa, Italy	Decision (Unanimous)	3	3:00
Wins the Slam 4 Flyweight tournament.
2016-03-16	Win	(Italy) Miriam Vivarini	Muay Thai Time: Iron Fight, Tournament Semifinals	Genoa, Italy	Decision (Unanimous)	3	3:00
2015-11-21	Loss	(United Kingdom) Ruth Ashdown	Muaythai Mayhem	Copthorne, West Sussex, United Kingdom	Decision (Unanimous)	3	3:00
2015-05-16	Loss	(France) Lizzie Largillière	La Nuit de l'Impact	Saintes, Charente-Maritime, France	Decision (Split)	5	3:00
For the ISKA European Flyweight title.
2015-04-11	Win	(Italy) Marzia Vadalà	Oktagon: Petrosyan vs Kehl	Milan, Italy	Decision (Unanimous)	3	3:00
2015-03-07	Win	(Italy) Aicha Amarhoun		Cento, Italy	Decision (Unanimous)	3	3:00
2014-12	Win	(Italy) Sara Falchetti		Italy	Decision (Unanimous)	3	3:00
2014-07-07	Win	(Italy) Michela Galli	Oktagon Selections 2015	Italy	Decision (Unanimous)	3	3:00
2014	Win	(Italy) Marzia Vadalà		Italy	Decision (Unanimous)	3	3:00
Legend: Win Loss Draw/No contest Notes

Amateur Kickboxing Record
Date	Result	Opponent	Event	Location	Method	Round	Time
2014-05-	Win	(Sweden) Laura Tower	ISKA World Championships, Tournament Final		Decision	3	2:00
Won the ISKA World title.
2014-05-	Win	(Germany) Luana Perugini	ISKA World Championships, Tournament Semifinal		Decision	3	2:00
Legend: Win Loss Draw/No contest Notes

== Mixed martial arts record ==
Professional record breakdown
2 matches	1 win	1 loss
By knockout	0	1
By submission	1	0

Res.	Record	Opponent	Method	Event	Date	Round	Time	Location	Notes
Loss	1–1	Giulia Chinello	TKO (Punches)	Fight1 - Iron Fighter 20	10 November 2018	1	2:04	Pordenone, Italy	
Win	1–0	Claudia Archir	Submission (Rear-Naked Choke)	Luctor Cage Fight - Luctor 2017	8 July 2017	1	1:57	Pistoia, Italy	

== Professional boxing record ==
8 fights	7 wins	0 losses
By knockout	3	0
By decision	4	0
Draws	1	

No.	Result	Record	Opponent	Type	Round, time	Date	Location	Notes
8	Win	7–0–1	Laura Pain	UD	10	May 8, 2026	Centro Pavesi, Milan, Italy	Retained the EBU bantamweight title.
7	Win	6–0–1	Natalia Francesca	UD	10	May 10, 2025	Palasport, Carbonia, Italy	Won the vacant EBU bantamweight title.
6	Win	5–0–1	Cristina Garrobo	KO	10 (10)	Oct 26, 2024	Teatro al Massimo, Palermo, Italy	Won EBU Silver bantamweight title.
5	Win	4–0–1	Dijana Babić	KO	3 (6)	Jun 8, 2024	Palaruffini, Torino, Italy	
4	Win	3–0–1	Tijana Drašković	KO	6 (8)	May 3, 2024	Centro Universitario Sportivo, Palermo, Italy	
3	Win	2–0–1	Antonina Cuti	PTS	6	Oct 13, 2023	Teatro Italia, Roma, Italy	
2	Draw	1–0–1	Giacoma Cordio	SD	6	May 5, 2023	Tivoli, Italy	
1	Win	1–0	Chiara Insarrualde	PTS	4	Mar 24, 2023	Allianz Cloud, Milan, Italy	

== See also ==
- List of female kickboxers
