= Mellony Geugjes =

Dutch kickboxer

- Born: Mellony Eva Geugjes; 26 July 1992 (age 34); Amsterdam, Netherlands
- Height: 5 ft 6 in (1.68 m)
- Weight: 115 lb (52 kg; 8.2 st)
- Division: Strawweight (MMA); Featherweight (Muay Thai)
- Reach: 70.0 in (178 cm)
- Style: Boxing, Muay Thai
- Stance: Orthodox
- Team: Mike's Gym

Professional boxing record
- Total: 1
- Losses: 1

Kickboxing record
- Total: 34
- Wins: 23
- By knockout: 3
- Losses: 8
- Draws: 3

Mixed martial arts record
- Total: 11
- Wins: 3
- By submission: 1
- By decision: 2
- Losses: 8
- By knockout: 1
- By submission: 1
- By decision: 6

Other information
- Boxing record from BoxRec
- Mixed martial arts record from Sherdog

Mellony Geugjes (born 26 July 1992) is a Dutch female kickboxer and mixed martial artist, based in Amsterdam, Netherlands. She has competed professionally since 2009 and is the current ISKA Featherweight champion which she won by defeating Dilara Yildiz.

== Mixed martial arts ==
=== The Ultimate Fighter ===
In April 2016, it was announced that Geugjes would be a contestant on The Ultimate Fighter: Team Joanna vs. Team Cláudia. She was defeated by Amanda Cooper in the opening qualifying round.

== Championships and awards ==
- ISKA
  - 2014 – ISKA World Featherweight Title (56 kg)
- K-1
  - 2017 Krush Women's Flyweight Championship

== Kickboxing record ==
Kickboxing Record
24 Wins (6 (T)KOs), 9 Losses, 0 Draw
Date	Result	Opponent	Event	Location	Method	Round	Time	Record
2024-04-12	Loss	(Greece) Sofia Tsolakidou	KOK Fight Night in Athens	Athens, Greece	Decision	3	3:00	
2017-12-09	Loss	(Japan) KANA	Krush 83	Tokyo, Japan	Decision (Unanimous)	3	3:00	
Lost the Krush title (−50.0 kg/110 lb) Championship.
2017-05-13	Win	(Netherlands) Feride Kirat		Netherlands	Decision	3	3:00	23-8-3
2017-03-15	Win	(Japan) Momi	Krush.75	Tokyo, Japan	Decision	3	3:00	
Retains the Krush title (−50.0 kg/110 lb) Championship.
2017-01-15	Win	(Japan) KANA	Krush 72	Tokyo, Japan	Decision (Unanimous)	3	3:00	
Wins the Krush title (−50.0 kg/110 lb) Championship.
2015-11-21	Loss	(Netherlands) Lorena Klijn	Enfusion Live 34	Groningen, Netherlands	Ext.R Decision	4	2:00	
2015-07-04	Loss	(Slovakia) Lucia Krajčovič	Hanuman Cup 27	Senec, Slovakia	Decision	3	3:00	
2015-06-20	Loss	(Italy) Jleana Valentino			Decision	5	3:00	
For the WFC European -52kg title.
2015-11-10	Loss	(Germany) Julia Irmen		Munich, Germany	Decision	3	3:00	
Fought for WKU World Title 57.5kg
2014-12-06	Loss	(England) Grace Spicer		Amsterdam, Netherlands	Decision (unanimous)	3	3:00	
2014-10-04	Win	(Germany) Dilara Yildiz		Merseburg, Germany	Decision	3	3:00	
Wins the ISKA World Featherweight (−56.0 kg/125 lb) Full Contact Championship.
2012-10-13	Win	(Sweden) Jenny Krigsman	Supremacy League Rising	Netherlands	Decision	3	3:00	
2012-03-12	Loss	(Greece) Marianna Kalergi		Netherlands	KO			
2011-11-27	Loss	(England) Alexis Rufus	Stars Fight Night	London, England	Decision (unanimous)	5	2:00	
2011-11-12	Loss	(Netherlands) Jemyma Betrian		(Netherlands) Philipsburg, Sint Maarten	Decision	3	3:00	
Legend: Win Loss Draw/No contest Notes

== Mixed martial arts record ==
Professional record breakdown
11 matches	3 wins	8 losses
By knockout	0	1
By submission	1	1
By decision	2	6
No contests	0	

Res.	Record	Opponent	Method	Event	Date	Round	Time	Location	Notes
Loss	3–8	Manon Fiorot	TKO (punches)	EFC Worldwide 80	June 29, 2019	3	4:17	Sibaya, South Africa	
Win	3–7	Naomi Tataroglu	Decision (unanimous)	Team Spirit 8	December 16, 2018	2	5:00	Beverwijk, Netherlands	
Loss	2–7	Griet Eeckhout	Decision (unanimous)	Strength & Honor Championship 14	October 6, 2018	3	5:00	Dessel, Belgium	For the SHC Flyweight Championship
Loss	2–6	Stephanie Ielö Page	Decision (unanimous)	100% Fight 36	June 30, 2018	3	5:00	Paris, France	For the 100% Fight Bantamweight Championship
Loss	2–5	Bo Meng	Decision (unanimous)	Glory of Heroes 31	May 26, 2018	3	5:00	Beijing, China	
Loss	2–4	Eva Dourthe	Decision (unanimous)	European Beatdown 3	March 17, 2018	3	5:00	Mons, Belgium	
Win	2–3	Christina Stelliou	Submission (rear-naked choke)	Spartacus Fighting Championships 5	June 4, 2017	3	2:17	Sofia, Bulgaria	
Win	1–3	Judith Levi	Decision (split)	Contenders Norwich 16	September 17, 2016	3	5:00	Norwich, Norfolk, England	
Loss	0–3	Bryony Tyrell	Decision (unanimous)	British Challenge MMA 16	July 23, 2016	3	5:00	Colchester, Essex, England	For the BCMMA Strawweight Championship
Loss	0–2	Montana Stewart	Decision (unanimous)	SCC Preserving the Arts	June 3, 2016	3	5:00	Fort Worth, Texas	
Loss	0–1	Dora Perjes	Submission (armbar)	Croatian MMA League: Superfinals 2013	December 7, 2013	1	0:50	Zagreb, Croatia	
