= Swanlea School =

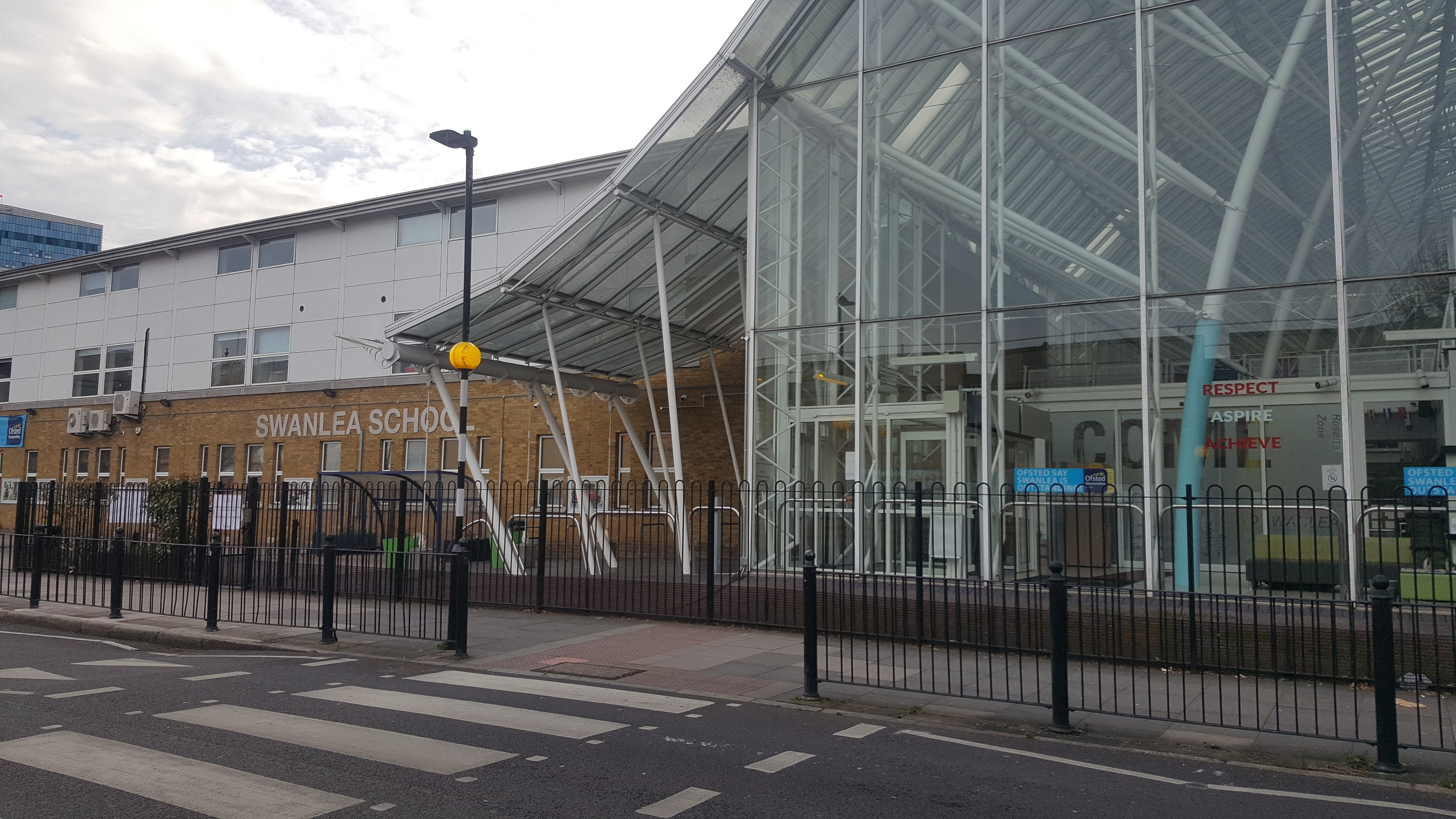

Location
- Brady Street; Whitechapel, London, E1 5DJ; England; 51.5209°N 0.0592°W

Information
- Type: Community school
- Established: 1993
- Local authority: Tower Hamlets
- Department for Education URN: 100973 Tables
- Ofsted: Reports
- Executive Headteacher: Kabir Miah
- Gender: Coeducational
- Age: 11 to 18
- Colour: Red/Grey/Black
- Website: http://swanlea.co.uk

Swanlea School is a co-educational comprehensive secondary school in Whitechapel with approximately 1200 students from age 11-18. 210 of these students are at Sixth Form /Key Stage 5. It is situated in the heart of the historic east end of London and less than a mile away from the City of London; it serves the local community.

Swanlea School was one of the first schools in the country to be awarded Business and Enterprise specialist status by the DCFS in 2002, and after inspection by OFSTED (April 2024) Swanlea was judged to be outstanding in all areas for the third consecutive time.

The school holds the Healthy Schools Award, Investors in People Award, Artsmark Silver Award, are Stonewall School Champions and is a UCL Beacon School in Holocaust Education.

Swanlea School has had two Headteachers, Linda Austin and Brenda Landers. Linda Austin retired in January 2011 after 18 years of service, and was awarded an OBE for services to Education in the Queen's birthday honours list in 2011. Brenda Landers became the Executive Headteacher in 2023, and Kabir Miah was appointed to the Head of School role in 2024.

Swanlea School was designed by Percy Thomas Partnership with Hampshire County Architects. It opened in 1993 and was the first secondary school built in London for over 10 years. The school was built around a central covered 'street' with a dramatic curved glass roof and was passively heated and ventilated.
