= Grace Spicer =

English Muay Thai

- Born: Grace Ann Spicer; London, England
- Nickname: "The Lioness"
- Nationality: English
- Height: 1.67 m (5 ft 5 1/2 in)
- Weight: 50–52 kg (110–115 lb; 7 st 12 lb – 8 st 3 lb)
- Division: Flyweight; Super Flyweight
- Style: Muay Thai
- Fighting out of: London, England
- Team: Bad Company Gym
- Trainer: Andy Howson
- Years active: 2010 - present

Kickboxing record
- Total: 33
- Wins: 27
- Losses: 6

Other information
- University: Greenwich Community College

Grace Spicer (born 19 September 1992) is an English kickboxer and Nak Muay. She is the IKF World Flyweight champion, is the WBC Muaythai International and British Super Flyweight champion, and has challenged for the WBC Muaythai World Super Flyweight title.

As of April 2020, she is the #1 ranked Super Flyweight according to WBC Muaythai, as well as being the mandatory challenger.

== Martial arts career ==
Spicer won the WBC Muaythai International Super Flyweight title with a unanimous decision win over Ariana Santos.

In August 2019 Spicer fought Cindy Silvestre, and won the fight, as well as the IKF World Flyweight title, by a unanimous decision.

In 2020, Spicer fought Lara Fernandez for the WBC Muaythai World Super Flyweight title. Spicer lost a unanimous decision.

== Championships and accomplishments ==
- International Kickboxing Federation
  - IKF World Flyweight Championship
- World Boxing Council Muaythai
  - WBC Muaythai International Super Flyweight Championship
  - WBC Muaythai British Super Flyweight Championship

== Kickboxing record ==
Kickboxing record
27 Wins, 6 Losses, 0 Draws, 0 No Contest
Date	Result	Opponent	Event	Location	Method	Round	Time
2022-04-02	Loss	(Italy) Francisca Vera	Combat Fight Series 4	London, England	Decision (Unanimous)	5	3:00
For the MTGP World -50 kg title.
2021-10-09	Win	(Greece) Foiteini Nanou	MTGP London	London, England	Decision (Unanimous)	3	3 :00
2020-03-09	Loss	(Spain) Lara Fernandez	Combat Fight Series 4	London, England	Decision (Unanimous)	5	2:00
For the WBC Muaythai World Super Flyweight Title.
2019-08-03	Win	(France) Cindy Silvestre	Capital Punishment	Southampton, England	Decision (Unanimous)	5	2:00
For the IKF World Flyweight Title.
2019-03-02	Loss	(Australia) Kim Townsend	Ignite the Fight 26	Brisbane, Australia			
2018-11-10	Win	(Italy) Martina Bernille	Muay Thai Grand Prix 21	London, England	Decision (Unanimous)	3	3:00
2015-04-07	Loss	(England) Nicola Kaye	MTGP PRESENTS LF41	London, England	Decision (Unanimous)	5	2:00
2015-03-07	Loss	(Russia) Marina Zueva	Dinamite Fight Night 28	Lisbon, Portugal	Decision (Unanimous)	3	3:00
For the WKU World Title.
2014-12-06	Win	(Netherlands) Mellony Geugjes	?	Amsterdam, Netherlands	Decision (Unanimous)	3	3:00
2014-11-08	Win	(Portugal) Ariana Santos	Muaythai Mayhem	London, England	Decision (Unanimous)	5	2:00
Wins the WBC Muaythai International Super Flyweight Title.
2014-05-04	Win	(England) Leonie Hardman	Muaythai Mayhem	London, England	Decision (Unanimous)	5	2:00
Wins the WBC Muaythai British Super Flyweight Title.
2014-03-16	Win	(England) Sarah Chaz	Super MTC	London, England	Decision (Unanimous)	3	2:00
2013-11-02	Loss	(England) Christi Brereton	Super MTC	London, England	Decision (Unanimous)	5	2:00
For the WBC Muaythai British Super Flyweight Title.
2013-08-17	Win	(Norway) Anne Line Hogstad	Stand and Bang	London, England	Decision (Unanimous)	5	2:00
Legend: Win Loss Draw/No contest Notes

== See also ==
List of female kickboxers
