= Natalia Diachkova =

Russian kickboxer (born 1994)

Natalya Dyachkova
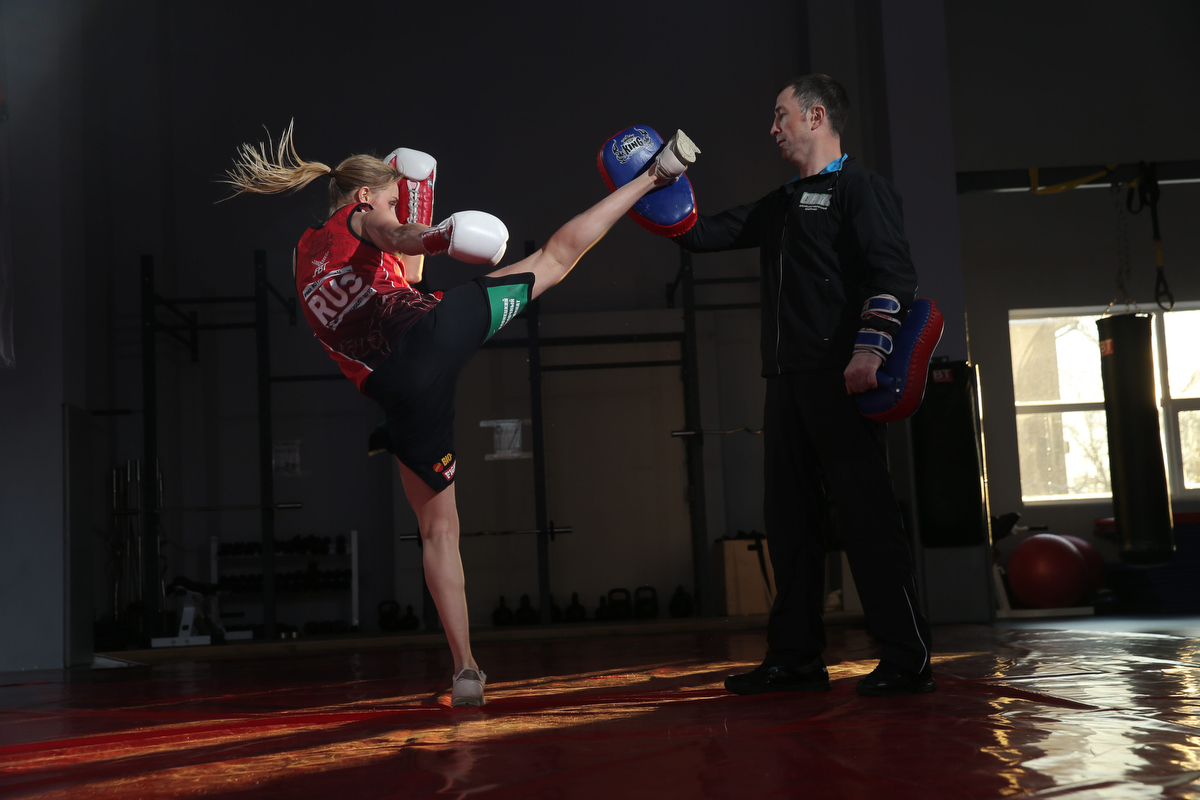
- Born: Natalya Dmitrievna Dyachkova; November 11, 1994 (age 31); Petrozavodsk, Republic of Karelia, Russia
- Native name: Наталья Дмитриевна Дьячкова
- Other names: Karelian Lynx
- Height: 170 cm (5 ft 7 in)
- Weight: 57 kg (126 lb; 9 st 0 lb)
- Division: Strawweight
- Style: Muay Thai
- Fighting out of: Russia
- Team: Venum Training Camp
- Trainer: Mehdi Zatout
- Years active: 2006–present

Kickboxing record
- Total: 36
- Wins: 31
- By knockout: 6
- Losses: 5

Mixed martial arts record
- Total: 3
- Wins: 1
- By decision: 1
- Losses: 2
- By submission: 2

Other information
- Mixed martial arts record from Sherdog

Natalya Dmitrievna Dyachkova (Russian: Дьячкова, Наталья Дмитриевна; born 11 November 1994), colloquially known as Natalia Diachkova is a Russian Muay Thai and kickboxer who is competing in ONE Championship. She is a former IFMA, WMC and WPMF Muay Thai world champion.

== Career ==
=== World Wushu Championships ===
In 2010, Dyachkova won bronze medal in Wusu Sanda Junior World Championship.

=== International Federation of Muaythai Associations ===
in 2009, Dyachkova won silver medal and in 2012, she won gold medal in IFMA world championship.

=== World Professional Muaythai Federation ===
In 2012, Dyachkova won WPMF Muay Thai world title.

=== World Muaythai Council ===
On April 28, 2014, Dyachkova defeated Chiu Hoi-Yan in WMC I-1 World Muaythai Grand Prix and won WMC Muay Thai world title.

=== ONE Championship ===
On April 21, 2023, Diachkova made her ONE debut at ONE Friday Fights 13, where she defeated Dokmaipa Fairtex by KO in the first round.

On June 2, 2023, Diachkova defeated Lena Nocker by KO in the first round at ONE Friday Fights 19.

Diachkova faced Smilla Sundell for the ONE Women's Strawweight Muay Thai World Championship on May 4, 2024, at ONE Fight Night 22. At the weigh-ins, Sundell came in at 126.5 lb (after coming in at 127.7 lb in for an unofficial check two and a half hours into the weigh-ins), 1.5 pounds over the strawweight limit for a title fight. As a result, Sundell was stripped of the title and only Diachkova was eligible to win it. She lost the fight via technical knockout in the second round.

== Titles and accomplishments ==
=== Amateur ===
- International Federation of Muaythai Associations
  - 2009 IFMA World Championship Junior 54 kg (silver)
  - 2011 IFMA European Championship Junior 57 kg (silver)
  - 2011 IFMA World Championship Junior 57 kg (silver)
  - 2012 IFMA World Championship Junior 57 kg (gold)
  - 2013 IFMA European Championship 57 kg (gold)
  - 2016 IFMA World Championship 54 kg (silver)
  - 2018 IFMA European Championship 57 kg (bronze)
- World Wushu Championships
  - 2010 Wusu Sanda 56 kg Junior World Championship (bronze)
- World Combat Games
  - 2013 World Combat Games Muaythai -54 kg (silver)

=== Professional ===
- World Professional Muaythai Federation
  - 2012 WPMF Muay Thai -54 kg World Championship
- World Muaythai Council
  - 2014 WMC I-1 -54 kg Championship

== Muay Thai and kickboxing record ==
Professional Muay Thai record
31 Wins (6 (T)KO's), 6 Losses, 0 Draw
Date	Result	Opponent	Event	Location	Method	Round	Time
2026-08-15	Loss	(Austria) Stella Hemetsberger	ONE Fight Night 46	Bangkok, Thailand	KO (Body kick and punches)	3	1:46
For the ONE Women's Strawweight Muay Thai World Championship.
2026-05-01	Win	(Thailand) Fahsai Or.Yuthachai	ONE Friday Fights 152, Lumpinee Stadium	Bangkok, Thailand	KO (punches)	1	1:17
2025-01-17	Win	(Canada) Taylor McClatchie	ONE Friday Fights 94, Lumpinee Stadium	Bangkok, Thailand	Decision (Unanimous)	3	3:00
2024-05-04	Loss	(Sweden) Smilla Sundell	ONE Fight Night 22	Bangkok, Thailand	TKO (Punches + knees to the body)	2	2:59
For the vacant ONE Women's Strawweight Muay Thai World Championship. Sundell missed weight (126.5 lb) and was stripped the title. Only Diachkova will be eligible to win the title.
2024-03-15	Win	(Netherlands) Chellina Chirino	ONE Friday Fights 55, Lumpinee Stadium	Bangkok, Thailand	KO (Punch)	1	1:44
2023-09-08	Win	(England) Hannah Brady	ONE Friday Fights 32, Lumpinee Stadium	Bangkok, Thailand	Decision (Unanimous)	3	3:00
2023-06-02	Win	(Italy) Lena Nocker	ONE Friday Fights 19, Lumpinee Stadium	Bangkok, Thailand	KO (Punches)	1	1:48
2023-04-21	Win	(Thailand) Dokmaipa Fairtex	ONE Friday Fights 13, Lumpinee Stadium	Bangkok, Thailand	KO (Punches)	1	1:41
2016-10-21	Win	(Slovenia) Monika Kucinic	W5 Grand Prix 38	Moscow, Russia	Decision	3	3:00
2016-01-13	Loss	(China) Li Mingrui	Wu Lin Feng E.P.I.C. 1	Zhengzhou, China	Decision	3	3:00
2015-04-24	Win	(Russia) Anzhela Takhirova	W5 Grand Prix	Moscow, Russia	Decision	3	3:00
2014-12-21	Win	(Russia) Lydia Solodkova	Battle on Onego 2	Russia	Decision	3	3:00
2014-04-28	Win	(Hong Kong) Chiu Hoi-Yan	WMC I-1 World Muaythai Grand Prix	Hong Kong	Decision	5	3:00
Won the WMC I-1 Strawweight title.
2012-11-11	Win	(Slovakia) Kristina Lindterová	W5 FIGHTER	Moscow, Russia	Decision	3	3:00
2012-08-12	Win	(Switzerland)	Queen's Cup	Bangkok, Thailand	Decision (Unanimous)	5	3:00
Wins WPMF World title.
Legend: Win Loss Draw/No contest Notes

Amateur Muaythai record
Date	Result	Opponent	Event	Location	Method	Round	Time
2018-07-04	Loss	(France) Anaëlle Angerville	2018 IFMA European Championships, Semifinal	Prague, Czech Republic	Decision (Unanimous)	3	3:00
Won the I.F.M.A. 2018 European Championship -57kg Bronze Medal.
2018-07-02	Win	(Slovakia) Lucia Krajčovič	2018 IFMA European Championships, Quarterfinal	Prague, Czech Republic	Decision (Unanimous)	3	3:00
2016-05-27	Loss	(Sweden) Sofia Olofsson	I.F.M.A. World Championship 2016, Final - 54 kg	Jönköping, Sweden	Decision (unanimous)	3	3:00
Won the I.F.M.A. 2016 World Championship -54kg Silver Medal.
2016-05-26	Win	(France) Juliette Lacroix	I.F.M.A. World Championship 2016, Semifinal - 54 kg	Jönköping, Sweden	Decision (unanimous)	3	3:00
2016-05-24	Win	(Belarus) Ekaterina Vandaryeva	I.F.M.A. World Championship 2016, Quarterfinal - 54 kg	Jönköping, Sweden	Decision (unanimous)	3	3:00
2015-08-	Loss	(Thailand) Sopapan Littrakul	I.F.M.A. World Championship 2015, Quarter-Final	Bangkok, Thailand	Decision		
2015-08-	Win	(Turkey) Dilek Akar	I.F.M.A. World Championship 2015, First round	Bangkok, Thailand	Decision		
2014-09-26	Loss	(Sweden) Sofia Olofsson	I.F.M.A. European Championship 2014, Quarter-Final	Kraków, Poland	KO (knees)	3	
2013-10-23	Loss	(Thailand) Ratchadaphon Wihantamma	2013 World Combat Games, Final	Saint Petersburg, Russia	Decision (30-27)	3	3:00
Won World Combat Games Muaythai -54kg Silver Medal.
2013-07-27	Win	(Sweden) Sofia Olofsson	I.F.M.A. European Championship 2013, Final	Lisbon, Portugal	Decision (unanimous)	4	2:00
Won the I.F.M.A. 2013 European Championship -54kg Gold Medal.
2013-07-26	Win	(Belarus) Victoria Palyanskaya	I.F.M.A. European Championship 2013, Semifinal	Lisbon, Portugal	Decision	4	2:00
2012-09-12	Win	(Belarus) Viktoryia Nestiarenka	I.F.M.A. European Championship 2012, Final	Saint-Petersburg, Russia	Decision	4	2:00
Won the I.F.M.A. 2012 World Championship Junior -57kg Gold Medal.
2011-09-	Loss	(Ukraine) Anostasiya Sumonenko	I.F.M.A. World Championship 2011, Final	Tashkent, Uzbekistan	Decision	4	2:00
Won the I.F.M.A. 2011 World Championship Junior -57kg Silver Medal.
2011-09-	Win	(Turkey) Arican Nazan	I.F.M.A. World Tournament 2011, Semifinal	Tashkent, Uzbekistan	Decision	4	2:00
2011-04-	Win	(Turkey) Arican Nazan	I.F.M.A. European Tournament 2011, Final	Antalya, Turkey	Decision	4	2:00
Won the I.F.M.A. 2011 European Championship Junior -57kg Silver Medal.
Legend: Win Loss Draw/No contest Notes

== Mixed martial arts record ==
Professional record breakdown
3 matches	1 win	2 losses
By submission	0	2
By decision	1	0

Res.	Record	Opponent	Method	Event	Date	Round	Time	Location	Notes
Loss	1–2	Irina Degtyareva	Submission (ankle lock)	RCC: Intro 14	July 17, 2021	1	4:10	Ekaterinburg, Russia	
Win	1–1	Mariya Zdirok	Decision (unanimous)	RCC: Intro 5	September 14, 2019	3	5:00	Vilnius, Lithuania	
Loss	0–1	Julija Stoliarenko	Submission (armbar)	King of Kings 69	March 16, 2019	1		Vilnius, Lithuania	

== See also ==
- 2023 in ONE Championship
- List of ONE bonus award recipients
