= Therese Gunnarsson =

Swedish Muay Thai fighter

Therese "The Gun" Gunnarsson
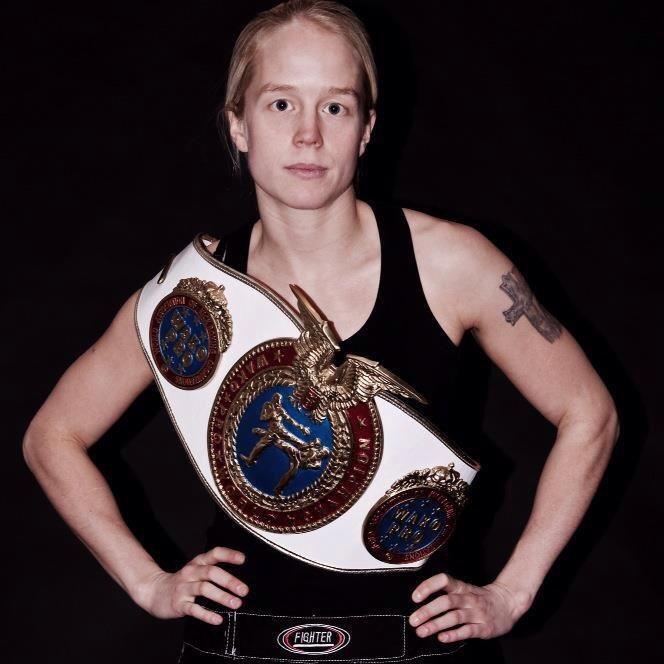
- Born: Therese Gunnarsson; November 30, 1983 (age 42); Örkelljunga, Sweden
- Other names: The Gun
- Nationality: (Sweden) Swedish
- Height: 1.63 m (5 ft 4 in)
- Weight: 52 kg (115 lb; 8.2 st)
- Division: Flyweight
- Style: Muay Thai
- Stance: Orthodox
- Fighting out of: Sweden
- Team: Fightzone
- Trainer: Florin Mican
- Years active: 2004–present

Professional boxing record
- Total: 1
- Wins: 1
- By knockout: 1

Other information
- Occupation: Social Worker
- Boxing record from BoxRec
- Last updated on: January 26, 2016

Therese Gunnarsson
Medal record

Representing Sweden

Kickboxing

World Championships
Bronze medal – third place	2013 Antalya	
Gold medal – first place	2011 Dublin	
Bronze medal – third place	2009 Villach	

European Championships
Bronze medal – third place	2008 Varna	−48 kg
Bronze medal – third place	2006 Lisbon	−50 kg

Muay Thai

World Championships
Bronze medal – third place	2017 Minsk	−54 kg

Royal World Cup
Bronze medal – third place	2015 Bangkok	−51 kg

Therese Gunnarsson (born November 30, 1983), nicknamed "The Gun", is a Swedish professional Muay Thai fighter. She started training kickboxing in 2004, but switched to Muay Thai in 2010. She has won both the WAKO Pro title, and the world amateur kickboxing championship. She is the first and only Swedish fighter to accomplish this.

In February 2014, Gunnarsson made her professional boxing debut against Sonja Soknic. She won the bout by KO late in the first round.

== Championships and awards ==
=== Kickboxing ===
- WAKO
  - 2013 - Swedish K1 Championship (gold)
  - 2013 - World K1 Championship (bronze)
  - 2012 - Swedish Kickboxing Championship (gold)
  - 2012 - Pro K1 World Kickboxing Championship, 52 kg (gold)
  - 2011 - World Kickboxing Championship K1-rules (gold)
  - 2010 - Swedish Kickboxing Championship (gold)
  - 2009 - Swedish Kickboxing Championship (gold)
  - 2009 - World Kickboxing Highkick Championship (bronze)
  - 2009 - World Kickboxing Lowkick Championship (silver)
  - 2008 - Swedish Kickboxing Championship (gold)
  - 2008 - European Kickboxing Championship, 48 kg (bronze)
  - 2007 - Swedish Kickboxing Championship (gold)
  - 2006 - European Kickboxing Championship, 50 kg (bronze)
  - 2006 - Swedish Kickboxing Championship (gold)

=== Muay Thai ===
- IFMA
  - 2017 World Muay Thai Championship (bronze)
  - 2017 Swedish Muay Thai Championship (silver)
  - 2016 Swedish Muay Thai Championship (silver)
  - 2015 Swedish Muay Thai Championship (gold)
  - 2015 Royal World Cup Muay Thai Championship (bronze)
  - 2014 Nordic Muay Thai Championship, 52 kg (gold)
  - 2010 Nordic Muay Thai Championship (gold)
  - 2010 Swedish Muay Thai Championship (gold)

=== Boxing ===
- AIBA
  - 2012 - Swedish Boxing Championship (silver)
  - 2010 - Swedish Boxing Championship (bronze)

== Kickboxing and Muay Thai record ==
Kickboxing and Muay Thai record (incomplete)
Kickboxing and Muay Thai record 84 wins (? KOs), 24 losses
Date	Result	Opponent	Event	Location	Method	Round	Time	Record
2017-04-01	Loss	(England) Iman Barlow	Muay Thai Grand Prix 7: Indigo at the O2	London, England	TKO (knees to the body)	5	1:40	
For the MTGP Bantamweight World title.
2016-06-24	Loss	(France) Anissa Meksen	Monte Carlo Fighting Masters	Monte Carlo, Monaco	Decision (unanimous)	5	3:00	
Lost the WAKO PRO Flyweight World title.
2016-04-15	Win	(Czech Republic) Alexandra Jursová	Clash of Titans	Plzeň, Czech Republic	TKO (elbows and punches)	3		
2015-11-14	Loss	(Sweden) Josefine Lindgren Knutsson	Battle of Lund 7	Lund, Sweden	Decision (unanimous)	5	3:00	
Lost the Battle of Lund Flyweight title.
2015-04-25	Win	(Sweden) Anna Olsson	Gladiatorspelen 7: All In	Skövde, Sweden	Decision (unanimous)	3	3:00	
2015-03-00	Loss	(England) Iman Barlow	Muay Thai event in England	Leicestershire, England	Decision (unanimous)	5	3:00	
2014-11-22	Win	(Norway) Anne Line Hogstad	Westcoast Kickboxing	Gothenburg, Sweden	TKO			
2014-11-22	Win	(Finland) Mirka Phetsangkhat	Westcoast Kickboxing	Gothenburg, Sweden	Decision (unanimous )	3	3:00	
2014-09-20	Win	(Portugal) Ariana Santos	Battle of Lund 6	Lund, Sweden	Decision (unanimous)	3	3:00	
Won the Battle of Lund Flyweight title.
2014-03-22	Loss	(Finland) Mirka Phetsangkhat	Escape Fight Night	Helsinki, Finland	Points	5	2:00	
2013-11-02	Loss	(Sweden) Sofia Olofsson	West Coast Battle 5	Varberg, Sweden	Decision (unanimous)	3	3:00	
2013-04-27	Loss	(Norway) Fatima Pinto	Gladiatorspelen 5: Rising Star	Skövde, Sweden	Decision (unanimous)	3	3:00	
2012-11-17	Win	(Turkey) Yeliz Koblay	WAKO PRO Championships	Helsingborg, Sweden	Decision	5	3:00	
Won the WAKO PRO Flyweight World title.
2012-05-26	Win	(Sweden) Marijeta Milic	Battle of Lund 4	Lund, Sweden	Points	3	3:00	
2012-00-00	Win	(Iran) Farinaz Lari	Kickboxing event in Macedonia	Macedonia	Decision	3	3:00	
Legend: Win Loss Draw/No contest Notes

== Professional boxing record ==
1 fight	1 win	0 losses
By knockout	1	0

No.	Result	Record	Opponent	Type	Round, time	Date	Location	Notes
1	Win	1-0	(Bosnia and Herzegovina) Sonja Soknic	KO	1 (4), 1:21	Feb 15, 2014	Rostock, Germany	
