= Iman Barlow =

English kickboxer (born 1993)

- Born: 14 April 1993 (age 33); Melton Mowbray, Leicestershire, England
- Other names: Pretty Killer
- Nationality: English
- Height: 1.66 m (5 ft 5 1/2 in)
- Weight: 52 kg (115 lb; 8.2 st)
- Division: Bantamweight; Super Bantamweight
- Style: Muay Thai, Kickboxing
- Stance: Orthodox
- Team: Assassins MuayThai Boxing Club
- Trainer: Mark Barlow
- Years active: 2008 - 2024

Kickboxing record
- Total: 107
- Wins: 97
- By knockout: 38
- Losses: 6
- Draws: 3
- No contests: 1

Iman Barlow (born 14 April 1993) is a retired professional English female kickboxer and Muay Thai fighter.

She is the former two time Enfusion 54 kg World champion with six successful title defenses, the former WRSA World champion, former Lion Fight Super Bantamweight champion., and the former WPMF World Bantamweight champion. She has fought Sofia Olofsson for the World Muaythai Council world title.

In May 2020, Combat Press ranked her #3 female fighter in the world, while WBC Muaythai ranked her #3 Super Bantamweight in the world in April 2020.

In 2013 Awakening Fighters voted her Fighter of the Year, Inspirational Fighter of the Year and awarded her the Fight of the Year (vs. Filipa Correia). In 2019 WBC Muaythai voted her the Female Fighter of the Year.

== Kickboxing career ==
Barlow began kickboxing at a young age, winning the IKF Junior British and European titles at just 9 years of age.

She made her professional debut in 2008, when she fought Evelina Adomulyte. She won the fight in the fourth round, by TKO due to punches. In the same year, she fought Denephar, and won a unanimous decision to clinch her first major honor, the S1 Bantamweight World title. She would later name Denephar as the best opponent she ever fought.

Barlow fought Nathalie Visschers for the WKA Muay Thai Bantamweight World title in 2009. She won a unanimous decision.

Over the next four years she amassed a 12–1–1 record. Denephar would give Barlow her first professional loss, by a unanimous decision. During this time Barlow achieved notable wins over Meryem Uslu, Teresa Wintermyr, Amy Pirnie, and Mellony Geugjes.

This winning streak culminated in a chance to fight for the Enfusion 54 kg World title against Alexis Rufus. Barlow won a unanimous decision. She would lose a split decision to Eva Naranjo in her first title defense.

A year later she faced Maritzarda Hersisia for the Golden Belt Bantamweight World title. Barlow won the fight with a high kick knockout in the second round. In the same year she defeated Linda Mancini to win the World Ring Sports Association Bantamweight belt, as well as winning a unanimous decision against Iman Ghbalou Chairi to once again win the Enfusion 54 kg World title.

She would subsequently enter the Enfusion K1 tournament. After beating Simone van Dommelen, Samantha van Doorn and Marina Zueva, she faced Anissa Meksen in the finals. Meksen won the fight with a second-round knockout.

She defended her Enfusion title in a rematch with Samantha van Doorn, her second defense would be against Veronika Petríková, and the third against Ilsury Hendrikse.

She won a unanimous decision win over Jeri Sitzes to win the Lion Fight Super Bantamweight World title, and a unanimous decision win over Meryem Uslu to defend the Lion Fight title.

In 2017 she scored a KO win over Therese Gunnarsson to win the Bantamweight Muay Thai Grand Prix.

Barlow once against defended her Enfusion title, with a split decision win over Ashley Nichols.

During Rumble of the Kings 18, she challenged Sofia Olofsson for the WMC Bantamweight World Championship. Olofsson won a unanimous decision.

Barlow's next Enfusion 54 kg title defense came against Lara Fernandez. She won a unanimous decision.

Barlow's eight Enfusion title defense came during Enfusion 82, when she fought Delphine Guénon. Barlow won a unanimous decision.

In November 2019, Barlow fought Brooke Farrell for the WBC Muaythai International title and won a unanimous decision.

=== ONE Championship ===
Barlow was booked to face Daniela Lopez at ONE: Lights Out on March 11, 2022. She won the fight by doctor stoppage in the first round.

Barlow faced Ekaterina Vandaryeva on March 25, 2023, at ONE Fight Night 8. She won the fight via unanimous decision.

Barlow announced her retirement from competition due to inactivity while contracted with the promotion.

== Championships and accomplishments ==
=== Amateur titles ===
- International Kickboxing Federation
  - IKF 2002 Junior British Championship
  - IKF 2002 Junior European Championship
- World Kickboxing Association
  - WKA 2009 Kickboxing World Championship
  - WKA 2009 K-1 World Championship
- World Games
  - 2022 IFMA Muay Thai at the World Games -57 kg (gold)
- International Federation of Muaythai Associations
  - 2021 IFMA World Championships −57 kg (gold)

=== Professional titles ===
- World Kickboxing Association
  - WKA Muay Thai Bantamweight World Championship
- World Ring Sports Association
  - WRSA 54 kg World Championship
- World Professional MuayThai Federation
  - WPMF World Bantamweight Championship (One time, former)
- Lion Fight
  - Lion Fight 54 kg World Championship (One time, current)
    - One successful title defense
- Enfusion
  - Enfusion 54 kg World Championship (Two times, former)
    - Six successful title defenses
      - Record number of title defenses (6)
      - Most consecutive title defenses (6)
    - Longest serving Enfusion champion (1924 days)
- World Boxing Council Muaythai
  - WBC International Muaythai 54 kg World Championship (One time, current)

== Kickboxing and Muay Thai record ==
Professional Kickboxing and Muay Thai record
97 wins (38 KOs), 6 losses, 3 draws
Date	Result	Opponent	Event	Location	Method	Round	Time
2023-03-25	Win	(Belarus) Ekaterina Vandaryeva	ONE Fight Night 8	Kallang, Singapore	Decision (unanimous)	3	3:00
2022-12-03	Win	(Spain) Atenea Flores	Muay Thai Addict League 3	Leicester, England	Decision	5	3:00
Won the Muay Thai Addict League World -55kg title.
2022-03-11	Win	(Argentina) Daniela Lopez	ONE: Lights Out	Kallang, Singapore	TKO (doctor stoppage)	1	1:39
2021-10-09	Win	(Italy) Sveva Melillo	Road to ONE: Muay Thai Grand Prix	London, England	Decision	5	3:00
Retained the MTGP Bantamweight World title.
2019-11-30	Win	(Australia) Brooke Farrell	Muay Thai Grand Prix 32	Melville, Australia	Decision (unanimous)	5	3:00
Won the WBC Muaythai Bantamweight International title.
2019-10-12	Win	(France) Cindy Silvestre	A Night of Muay Thai VII	Melton Mowbray, England	TKO (doctor stoppage)	3	
2019-04-13	Win	(France) Delphine Guénon	Eunfusion Live 82	Orchies, France	Decision (unanimous)	5	3:00
Retained the Enfusion Bantamweight World title.
2018-11-10	Win	(England) Hannah Brady	Muay Thai Grand Prix 21	London, England	Decision (unanimous)	3	3:00
2018-06-09	Win	(Spain) Lara Fernandez	Eunfusion Live 69	Newcastle, England	Decision (unanimous)	5	3:00
Retained the Enfusion Bantamweight World title.
2018-04-14	Win	(Australia) Yolanda Schmidt	Dynamite Muay Thai - Dynamite NAKSOO Female Fight Tour: Melbourne 3.0	Melbourne, Australia	Decision (unanimous)	3	3:00
2018-03-03	Win	(Italy) Jleana Valentino	A Night Of Muay Thai V	Melton Mowbray, England	Decision (unanimous)	3	3:00
2017-11-25	Loss	(Sweden) Sofia Olofsson	Rumble of the Kings 18: Uprising	Gothenburg, Sweden	Decision (unanimous)	5	3:00
For the WMC Bantamweight World title.
2017-10-14	Win	(France) Cindy Silvestre	A Night Of Muay Thai III	Melton Mowbray, England	Decision (unanimous)	3	3:00
2017-08-26	Win	(Thailand) Ranee Klinratree	Ladies Fight Night 6	Rawa Mazowiecka, Poland	Decision (unanimous)	3	3:00
2017-07-08	Win	(Canada) Ashley Nichols	Enfusion Live 51	Halifax, Nova Scotia, United States	Decision (split)	5	2:00
Retained the Enfusion Bantamweight World title.
2017-04-01	Win	(Sweden) Therese Gunnarsson	Muay Thai Grand Prix 7: Indigo at the O2	London, England	TKO (knees to the body)	5	1:40
Won the MTGP Bantamweight World title.
2017-02-03	Win	(Germany) Meryem Uslu	Lion Fight 34	Las Vegas, Nevada, United States	Decision (unanimous)	5	3:00
Retained the Lion Fight Super Bantamweight World title.
2016-11-20	Win	(Colombia) Ilsury Hendrikse	Enfusion Live 43	Groningen, Netherlands	Decision (unanimous)	5	3:00
Retained the Enfusion Bantamweight World title.
2016-09-02	Win	(United States) Jeri Sitzes	Lion Fight 31	Mashantucket, Connecticut, United States	Decision (unanimous)	5	3:00
Won the vacant Lion Fight Super Bantamweight World title.
2016-04-23	Win	(Slovakia) Veronika Petríková	Enfusion Live 39	Žilina, Slovakia	Decision (unanimous)	5	3:00
Retained the Enfusion Bantamweight World title.
2016-03-26	Win	(Portugal) Maria Lobo	Muay Thai Grand Prix 3	London, England	Decision (unanimous)	3	3:00
2016-02-20	Win	(Spain) Maribel de Sousa	K-1 event in England	Leicestershire, England	Decision (unanimous)	3	3:00
2015-12-11	Win	(Australia) Alicia Pestana	Onyx Fight Promotions: Thunderdome XIII	Perth, Australia	Decision (unanimous)	5	3:00
2015-11-07	Win	(Netherlands) Samantha van Doorn	Enfusion Live 30	Dublin, Ireland	Decision (unanimous)	5	3:00
Retained the Enfusion Bantamweight World title.
2015-10-24	Win	(Norway) Fatima Pinto	Muay Thai event in England	Leicestershire, England	TKO	1	
2015-05-02	Win	(China) Xu Zhurong	K-1 event in China	Zhengzhou, China	Decision (unanimous)	3	3:00
2015-03-00	Win	(Sweden) Therese Gunnarsson	Muay Thai event in England	Leicestershire, England	Decision (unanimous)	5	3:00
2014-12-21	Win	(Indonesia) Soraya Haurissa	Enfusion Live 23	Antwerp, Belgium	Decision (unanimous)	3	3:00
2014-09-23	Loss	(Algeria) Anissa Meksen	Enfusion Reality Season 5: Victory of the Vixen, K-1 Tournament Final	Ko Samui, Thailand	KO (punch)	2	
For the Enfusion Rezality K-1 Tournament title.
2014-09-23	Win	(Russia) Marina Zueva	Enfusion Reality Season 5: Victory of the VixenK-1 Tournament Semifinal	Ko Samui, Thailand	TKO		
2014-09-23	Win	(Netherlands) Samantha van Doorn	Enfusion Reality Season 5: Victory of the Vixen	Ko Samui, Thailand	Decision		
2014-09-18	Win	(Netherlands) Simone van Dommelen	Enfusion Reality Season 5: Victory of the Vixen	Ko Samui, Thailand	Decision		
2014-07-12	Win	(Spain) Iman Ghbalou Chairi	Enfusion Live 20	Mallorca, Spain	Decision (unanimous)	5	3:00
Won the Enfusion Bantamweight World title.
2014-05-31	Win	(Italy) Linda Mancini	World Ring Sports Association Muay Thai Event	Leicestershire, England	Points	5	3:00
Won the WRSA Bantamweight World title.
2014-03-22	Win	(Netherlands) Lorena Klijn	Enfusion Live 15	Dublin, Ireland	Decision (unanimous)	3	3:00
2014-02-22	Win	(Netherlands) Maritzarda Hersisia	Muay Thai event in England	Leicestershire, England	KO (high kick)	2	1:04
Won the Golden Belt Bantamweight World title.
2014-01-25	Win	(Israel) Adi Rotem	Enfusion Live 13	Eindhoven, Netherlands	Decision (unanimous)	3	3:00
2013-12-01	Win	(Russia) Marina Zueva	Enfusion Live 11	London, England	Decision (unanimous)	3	3:00
2013-10-12	Win	(Portugal) Filipa De Oliveira Correia	Enfusion Live 8	London, England	Decision (unanimous)	3	3:00
2013-07-13	Loss	(Spain) Eva Naranjo	Enfusion Live 7	Tenerife, Spain	Decision (split)	4	3:00
Lost the Enfusion Bantamweight World title.
2013-06-29	Win	(Jersey) Hayley-Jayne Houguez	Lock in Muay Thai	Saint Peter Port, Guernsey	Decision (unanimous)	5	2:00
2013-06-01	Win	(Greece) Fani Peloumpi	Team Assassins Event	Leicestershire, England	Decision (unanimous)	5	2:00
2013-03-30	Win	(England) Alexis Rufus	Enfusion Live 3	London, England	Decision (unanimous)	5	3:00
Won the Enfusion Bantamweight World title.
2013-03-09	Win	(Spain) Maribel de Sousa	Enfusion Live 2	Barcelona, Spain	Decision (unanimous)	3	3:00
2012-11-24	Win	(France) Marlene Caneva	Cardiff City FC	Cardiff, Wales	TKO (retirement)	2	3:00
2012-10-00	Draw	(Thailand) Sawsing Sor Sopit	Muay Thai event in Thailand	Pattaya, Thailand	Draw	3	3:00
2012-05-20	Win	(South Africa) Ferial Ameeroedien	King of the Ring 17	Nottingham, England	Points	3	3:00
2012-03-31	Win	(Netherlands) Kelsey van de Poll	Xplosion Fight Series	London, England	TKO (knee to the body)	2	1:00
2012-02-00	Win	(Netherlands) Mellony Geugjes	Muay Thai event in England	Leicestershire, England	Points	3	3:00
2011-11-26	Win	(France) Lizzie Largillière	Low Kick Muay Thai	Paris, France	Points	3	3:00
2011-11-12	Win	(England) Lanchana Green	Xplosion Fight Series	Greenwich, England	TKO (punches and high kick)	3	
2011-10-15	Win	(Sweden) Johanna Rydberg	Muay Thai event in England	Leicestershire, England	Points	3	3:00
2011-09-17	Win	(Scotland) Amy Pirnie	Muay Thai event in Scotland	Glasgow, Scotland	TKO (body punch)	2	
2011-08-28	Win	(Sweden) Teresa Wintermyr	Muay Thai event in Thailand	Phuket, Thailand	Decision	5	2:00
2011-05-07	Win	(Germany) Meryem Uslu	Muay Thai event in England	Leicestershire, England	Points	3	3:00
2011-02-00	Win	(Latvia)	Muay Thai Event in Latvia	Latvia	KO	1	
2009-08-00	Loss	(Thailand) Denephar	Muay Thai Event in Thailand	Bangkok, Thailand	Points	3	3:00
2009-00-00	Win	(Belgium) Nathalie Visschers			Points		
Won the WKA Muay Thai Bantamweight World title.
2008-08-00	Win	(Thailand) Denephar	S1 Event	Bangkok, Thailand	Points	5	3:00
Won the S1 Bantamweight World title.
2008-00-00	Draw	(Scotland) Amy Pirnie	Muay Thai event in Scotland	Glasgow, Scotland	Draw	3	3:00
2008-00-00	Win	(Spain) Maria Curriki	Muay Thai event in England	Leicestershire, England	Points		
2008-00-00	Win	(Venezuela) Karla Benitez	Muay Thai event in England	Leicestershire, England	Points		
2008-00-00	Win	(Lithuania) Silvija Morkanaite	Muay Thai event in Lithuania	Lithuania	TKO (low kicks)		
2008-00-00	Win	(Lithuania) Evelina Adomulyte	Muay Thai event in Lithuania	Lithuania	TKO (punches)	4	

Amateur kickboxing, muay thai record (Incomplete)
Date	Result	Opponent	Event	Location	Method	Round	Time
2022-07-17	Win	(United States) Tierra Brandt	2022 World Games, Tournament Final	Birmingham, Alabama, U.S.	Decision (Unanimous)	3	3:00
Won the 2022 World Games Women's Muay thai (−57 kg) Gold Medal.
2022-07-16	Win	(Sweden) Patricia Axling	2022 World Games, Tournament Semifinal	Birmingham, Alabama, U.S.	Decision (Unanimous)	3	3:00
2022-07-15	Win	(Portugal) Matilde Rodrigues	2022 World Games, Tournament Quarterfinal	Birmingham, Alabama, U.S.	Decision (Unanimous)	3	3:00
2021-12-11	Win	(France) Anaëlle Angerville	2021 IFMA World Championships, Tournament Final	Kuala Lumpur, Malaysia	Decision (Unanimous)	3	3:00
Won the 2021 IFMA World Championships (−57 kg) Gold Medal.
2021-12-10	Win	(Sweden) Patricia Axling	2021 IFMA World Championships, Tournament Semifinal	Kuala Lumpur, Malaysia	Decision (Unanimous)	3	3:00
2021-12-07	Win	(India) Priya Sharma	2021 IFMA World Championships, Tournament Quarterfinal	Kuala Lumpur, Malaysia	Decision (Unanimous)	2	3:00
2009-00-00	Win	(Sweden) Ingrid Stevenson	WKA 2009 K-1 World Championship	Spain	Points		
Won the WKA 2009 K-1 World Championship.
2009-00-00	Win	(Germany) Lisa Hartman	WKA 2009 Kickboxing World Championship	Spain	TKO (punches)		
Won the WKA 2009 Kickboxing World Championship.
2006-00-00	Win	(England) Sandra	Team Assassins Event	England	KO (punches)	1	
2002-11-16	Win	(Wales) Donna Price	IKF 2002 Junior European Championship	Leicestershire, England	Decision (unanimous)		
Won the IKF 2002 Junior European Championship.
2002-06-23	Win	(England) Jessica Isaac	IKF 2002 Junior British Championship	Liverpool, England	Decision (unanimous)		
Won the IKF 2002 Junior British Championship.
Legend: Win Loss Draw/No contest Notes

== See also ==
List of female kickboxers
