= Eva Naranjo =

Spanish martial artist

Eva María Naranjo Fernández
- Born: 10 July 1978 (age 48); Valdepeñas, Castilla-La Mancha, Spain
- Nationality: Spanish
- Height: 160
- Weight: 54 kg (119 lb; 8 st 7 lb)
- Division: Bantamweight#Boxing|Bantamweight
- Style: Kickboxing - Muay Thai - Boxeo
- Stance: Orthodox
- Fighting out of: La Nucia, Valencian Community, Spain
- Team: Maengho
- Trainer: Eduardo Martín - Mario Vega - Sento Martínez Jesús labrador
- Years active: 20

Professional boxing record
- Total: 30
- Wins: 12
- By knockout: 3
- Losses: 18
- By knockout: 0

Kickboxing record
- Total: 148
- Wins: 128
- Losses: 18
- Draws: 2

Other information
- Occupation: Muay Thai Coach

Eva María Naranjo Fernandez (born 10 July 1978) is a Spanish boxer, kickboxer and Muay Thai fighter. She is the current WAKO World Bantamweight champion, and the former Enfusion -54 kg, WPMF World Super Flyweight and WMF World Super Flyweight champion.

She is also the former WBC International Bantamweight Champion.

Record 148 Fights 128 win lose 18 2 Draw

5 times world champion. 5 times European champion. 9 times champion of Spain.

== Martial arts career ==
In March 2009, Naranjo fought Seda Aygün for the WAKO World Bantamweight title. She won the fight by unanimous decision.

She took part in the 2010 IFMA World Amateur Championships. She took the first place in the tournament.

In March 2015, Naranjo fought Kwanjai Sorporlor Chaiyaphum for the WPMF World Super Flyweight title. She won the fight by KO.

She was scheduled to fight Davinia Perez for the WBC International title, on June 29, 2018. Naranjo won the fight by a unanimous decision.

Following this victory, Naranjo was scheduled to fight Mariana Juárez for WBC World Bantamweight title on March 2, 2019. Juárez won the fight by unanimous decision.

== Championships and accomplishments ==
Kickboxing

- 2010 IFMA World Amateur Champion
- 2013 Enfusion -54 kg Champion
- 2015 WPMF World Super Flyweight Champion
- 2015 WMF World Super Flyweight Champion
- 2017 WAKO World Bantamweight Low Kick Champion

Boxing

- 2018 WBC International Bantamweight Champion

Awards

- 2010 Marina Baixa Best Professional Sportsman
- 2010 Alicante Best Female Fighter
- 2010 World Combat Games Best Muay Thai Fighter

== Boxing record ==
13 fights	12 wins	1 loss
By knockout	3	0
By decision	9	1
Draws	0	

No.	Result	Record	Opponent	Type	Round, time	Date	Location	Notes
13	Loss	12-1	(Mexico) Mariana Juárez	UD	10	2 March 2019	Gimnasio Solidaridad, Zacatecas, Mexico	For the WBC World Bantamweight title.
12	Win	12-0	(Spain) Davinia Perez	UD	10	29 June 2018	Pabellon Camilo Cano, Valencia, Spain	For the WBC International Bantamweight title.
11	Win	11-0	(Sweden) Angelique Hernandez	KO	6	10 March 2018	X Meeting Point, Oslo, Norway	
10	Win	10-0	(United Kingdom) Dani Hodges	TKO	4	26 August 2017	Plaza de Toros, Valencia, Spain	
9	Win	9-0	(Serbia) Jasmina Nad	UD	6	14 July 2017	Palacio de los Deportes, Valencia, Spain	
8	Win	8-0	(Sweden) Johanna Rydberg	UD	6	26 May 2017	Pabellon Municipal, Valencia, Spain	
7	Win	7-0	(Russia) Olga Zabavina	TKO	2	26 November 2016	Pabellón Raúl Mesa, Valencia, Spain	
6	Win	6-0	(Spain) Maribel De Sousa	SD	6	23 July 2016	Palacio de los Deportes, Valencia, Spain	
5	Win	5-0	(Colombia) Katherine Quintana	UD	6	30 April 2016	Pabellón Raúl Mesa, Benidorm, Spain	
4	Win	4-0	(Colombia) Katherine Quintana	PTS	6	13 February 2016	Pabellón de la Vall d'Hebron, Barcelona, Spain	
3	Win	3-0	(Italy) Vanesa Caruso	UD	6	21 November 2015	Pabellón Municipal, Finestrat, Spain	
2	Win	2-0	(Morocco) Aouatif Al Kallachi	PTS	4	10 July 2015	Torrequebrada Hotel & Casino, Benalmadena, Spain	
1	Win	1-0	(Spain) Maribel De Sousa	PTS	4	16 May 2015	Teatro Antique, Sevilla, Spain	

== Kickboxing record ==
Professional Kickboxing Record
83 Wins, 9 Losses, 2 Draw, 0 No Contest
Date	Result	Opponent	Event	Location	Method	Round	Time
2015-04-18	Loss	(France) Anissa Meksen	Enfusion Live 27	Tenerife, Spain	Decision (Unanimous)	3	3:00
2015-03-16	Win	(Thailand) Kwanjai Sorporlor Chaiyaphum	WPMF World Title	Bangkok, Thailand	KO		
Wins the WPMF World Super Flyweight title.
2013-07-13	Win	(United Kingdom) Iman Barlow	Enfusion Live 7	Tenerife, Spain	Decision (Split)	5	3:00
Wins the Enfusion -54 kg title.
2009-03-27	Win	(Turkey) Seda Aygün	WAKO World Title	Eskişehir, Turkey	Decision (Unanimous)	5	3:00
Wins the WAKO World Bantamweight title.
Legend: Win Loss Draw/No contest Notes

== See also ==
- List of female boxers
- List of female kickboxers
