= Anne Line Hogstad =

Norwegian kickboxer

- Born: 1988 (age 37–38); Oslo, Norway
- Nickname: "Ninja Line"
- Height: 1.65 m (5 ft 5 in)
- Weight: 53 kg (117 lb; 8 st 5 lb)
- Division: Atomweight; Strawweight
- Style: Kickboxing
- Fighting out of: Oslo, Norway
- Team: Team Anne Line Hogstad / Frontline Muay Thai Gym
- Years active: 2013–present

Kickboxing record
- Total: 51
- Wins: 32
- Losses: 19

Anne Line Hogstad is a Norwegian kickboxer and Muay Thai fighter competing in the Atomweight and Strawweight divisions.

She is ranked #4 in the ONE Atomweight kickboxing division and #2 in the ONE Atomweight Muay Thai division. WBC Muaythai ranks her as the #4 Super Flyweight in the world, as of April 2020.

She is a former two-time ISKA Muay Thai World Champion, ISKA Norwegian and Scandinavian Muay Thai champion, two-time Norwegian IFMA champion and two-time K-1 Nordic champion.

== Kickboxing career ==
Fighting at Oslo Fight Night, Hogstad faced Laura Prouse. She won the fight by a unanimous decision. During Battle of Lund 6 she achieved another victory, a decision win over Emilia Olsson. Following this win, she would lose to Therese Gunnarsson by way of TKO.

Hogstad would suffer a unanimous decision loss during Get in the Ring 18, dropping a decision to Meryem Uslu. This would be followed by a failed bid to capture the ISKA World title, as Hogstad lost a unanimous decision to Cynthia Gonzalez. She extended her losing streak to three fights, after losing a unanimous decision to Georgina van der Linden during Enfusion 71. She would bounce back with a win over Anna Höglund.

During La Nuit de l’Impact 5 Hogstad fought Delphine Guénon for the ISKA European K-1 title. Guénon won the title through a unanimous decision.

During the ONE Championship: Fire and Fury event, Hogstad faced the former WBC Muaythai champion Alma Juniku. The three round fight started slowly, with both fighters picking up the pace in the second round, while Juniku received a yellow card for repeated fouls. This also meant Juniku would forfeit 10% of her purse to Hogstad, who would eventually win a majority decision.

Hogstad faced Janet Todd at ONE on TNT 2 on April 14, 2021. She lost via a body kick that dropped Hogstad in the third round.

== Championships and accomplishments ==
- International Sport Karate Association
  - ISKA World Muay Thai Champion (Two times)
  - ISKA Scandinavian Muay Thai Champion
  - ISKA Norwegian Muay Thai Champion
- International Federation of Muaythai Associations
  - IFMA Norwegian Muay Thai Champion (Two times)
- K-1
  - K-1 Nordic Champion (Two times)

== Fight record ==
Professional Kickboxing Record
32 Wins, 19 Losses, 0 Draw, 0 No Contest
Date	Result	Opponent	Event	Location	Method	Round	Time
2021-04-14	Loss	(United States) Janet Todd	ONE on TNT 2	Kallang, Singapore	TKO (Body kick)	3	1:36
2020-01-31	Win	(Australia) Alma Juniku	ONE Championship: Fire and Fury	Manila, Philippines	Decision (Majority)	3	3:00
2019-08-24	Loss	(Scotland) Rhona Walker	Science of 8	Doncaster, England	Decision (Unanimous)	5	3:00
For the ICO European title.
2019-06-15	Loss	(France) Delphine Guénon	La Nuit de l’Impact V	Saintes, France	Decision (Unanimous)	5	3:00
For the ISKA European title.
2019-05-25	Win	(Sweden) Anna Höglund	Southside Battle 28	Haninge, Sweden	Decision (Unanimous)	3	3:00
2018-09-29	Loss	(Netherlands) Georgina van der Linden	Enfusion 71	Hamburg, Germany	Decision (Unanimous)	3	3:00
2018-07-07	Loss	(China) Yang Yang	Glory of Heroes 32	Huizhou, Guangdong, China	Decision (Unanimous)	3	3:00
2018-03-23	Loss	(Cuba) Cynthia Gonzalez	Kaeng Fight Night	Vannes, France	Decision (Unanimous)	5	3:00
For the ISKA World title.
2018-03-11	Loss	(Germany) Meryem Uslu	Get in the Ring 18	Hamburg, Germany	Decision (Unanimous)	3	3:00
2016-11-12	Loss	(Sweden) Josefine Lindgren Knutsson	Battle of Lund 8	Lund, Sweden	Decision (Unanimous)	5	3:00
For the Battle of Lund Flyweight title.
2015-7-4	Loss	(Scotland) Amy Pirnie	Stand And Bang	Woking, United Kingdom	Decision (Unanimous)	3	3:00
2014-11-22	Loss	(Sweden) Therese Gunnarsson	Westcoast Kickboxing	Gothenburg, Sweden	TKO		
2014-9-29	Win	(Sweden) Emilia Olsson	Battle of Lund 6	Woking, United Kingdom	Decision (Unanimous)	5	2:00
2015-02-28	Loss	(England) Nicola Kaye	?	England	Decision (Unanimous)	5	3:00
For the ISKA European title.
2014-10-5	Win	(England) Laura Prouse	Oslo Fight Night	Oslo, Norway	Decision (Unanimous)	3	3:00
2013-8-17	Loss	(England) Grace Spicer	Stand and Bang	Woking, United Kingdom	Decision (Unanimous)	5	2:00
Legend: Win Loss Draw/No contest Notes

Amateur Kickboxing Record
Date	Result	Opponent	Event	Location	Method	Round	Time
2015-11-14	Loss	(Sweden) Sofia Olofsson	Nordic Muay Thai Championships	Oslo, Norway	Decision (Unanimous)	3	2:00
2015-11-14	Win	(Finland) Elina Immonen	Nordic Muay Thai Championships	Oslo, Norway	Decision (Unanimous)	3	2:00
2014	Loss	(England) Laura Prouse	Rising Muay Thai Stars	Oslo, Norway	Decision (Unanimous)	3	2:00
Legend: Win Loss Draw/No contest Notes

== See also ==
- List of female kickboxers
