= Sofia Olofsson =

Swedish kickboxer

- Born: 4 September 1989 (age 37); Täby, Sweden
- Nationality: Swedish
- Height: 1.66 m (5 ft 5 1/2 in)
- Weight: 52 kg (115 lb; 8.2 st)
- Style: Muay Thai
- Stance: Orthodox
- Team: Odenplan Fight Gym
- Years active: 2011-

Kickboxing record
- Total: 59
- Wins: 50
- By knockout: 25
- Losses: 9
- By knockout: 0
- Last updated on: 23 May 2018

Sofia Olofsson
Medal record

Representing Sweden

Women's Muay Thai

World Championships
| Bronze medal – third place | 2014 Langkawi | −54 kg |
| Gold medal – first place | 2016 Jönköping | −54 kg |
| Gold medal – first place | 2018 Cancún | −54 kg |

Royal World Cup
| Gold medal – first place | 2015 Bangkok | −54 kg |

World Games
| Gold medal – first place | 2017 Wrocław | −54 kg |

European Championships
| Silver medal – second place | 2013 Lisbon | −54 kg |
| Gold medal – first place | 2014 Kraków | −54 kg |
| Gold medal – first place | 2017 Paris | −54 kg |

Sofia Olofsson (born 4 September 1989) is a Swedish female professional kickboxer, Muay Thai fighter. On 25 November 2016, at the Rumble of the Kings 15: Awakening, in Stockholm, Sweden, she defeated Parita Nongprai Padpho on TKO for the World Muaythai Council bantam weight world title. On 25 November 2017, at the Rumble of the Kings 18: Uprising, in Gothenburg, Sweden, she successfully defended her world title against Iman Barlow.

Olofsson won the gold medal at The World Games in 2017 in the under 54kg category. She has also won gold medals at the 2015 IFMA Royal World Cup and the 2016 and 2018 IFMA World Championships. In 2016 she won the International World Games Association - Athlete of the Year award, by public poll, having received a staggering 39% of the total number of votes.

== Championships and accomplishments ==
=== Championships ===
- Professional
- World Muaythai Council
  - WMC World Bantamweight (-53.5 kg) Championship
    - One successful title defense
  - WMC European Bantamweight (-53.5 kg) Championship
- Amateur
- IMFA
  - 2013 IFMA European Championship (silver) (-54 kg)
  - 2014 IFMA World Championship (bronze) (-54 kg)
  - 2014 IFMA European Championship (gold) (-54 kg)
  - 2015 IFMA Royal World Cup (gold) (-54 kg)
  - 2016 IFMA World Championship (gold) (-54 kg)
  - 2017 IFMA European Championship (gold) (-54 kg)
  - 2018 IFMA World Championship (gold) (-54 kg)
- International World Games Association - The World Games
  - 2017 The World Games Muay Thai Championship (gold) (-54 kg)
- Regional championships
  - 2012 Swedish National Muay Thai Championship (silver) (-54 kg)
  - 2013 Nordic Muay Thai Championship (gold) (-54 kg)
  - 2013 Swedish National Muay Thai Championship (gold) (-54 kg)
  - 2014 Swedish National Muay Thai Championship (gold) (-54 kg)
  - 2015 Swedish National Muay Thai Championship (gold) (-54 kg)
  - 2016 Swedish National Muay Thai Championship (gold) (-54 kg)
  - 2016 Nordic Muay Thai Championship (gold) (-54 kg)
  - 2017 Swedish National Muay Thai Championship (gold) (-54 kg)
  - 2018 Swedish National Muay Thai Championship (gold) (-54 kg)

=== Awards ===
  - 2015 IMFA Royal Cup - Best Female Fighter
  - 2016 International World Games Association - Athlete of the Year
  - 2016 IMFA World Championship - Best Female Fighter
  - 2017 The World Games - Best Female Fighter
  - 2017 Awakening Fighters Female Muay Thai Awards - Fight of the Year vs. Iman Barlow on 25 November

== Kickboxing and Muay Thai record ==
Kickboxing and Muay Thai record (incomplete)
Kickboxing and Muay Thai record 50 wins (25 KOs), 9 losses
| Date | Result | Opponent | Event | Location | Method | Round | Time | Record |
| 2019-06-22 | Loss | (Algeria) Anissa Meksen | Glory 66: Paris | Paris, France | TKO (doctor stoppage) | 1 | 2:06 | |
For the Glory Super Bantamweight Championship.
| 2019-05-17 | Win | (United Kingdom) Christi Brereton | Glory 65: Utrecht | Utrecht, Netherlands | Decision (split) | 3 | 3:00 | |
| 2018-10-20 | Win | (France) Cindy Silvestre | Glory 60: Lyon | Lyon, France | Decision (unanimous) | 3 | 3:00 | |
| 2018-07-20 | Loss | (United States) Tiffany van Soest | Glory 55: New York | New York City, New York, United States | Decision (split) | 3 | 3:00 | |
| 2017-11-25 | Win | (United Kingdom) Iman Barlow | Rumble of the Kings 18: Uprising | Gothenburg, Sweden | Decision (unanimous) | 5 | 3:00 | |
Retained the WMC World Bantamweight title.
| 2017-04-09 | Win | (China) Zhang Jiao | World Muay Thai Angels Tournament 2 | Bangkok, Thailand | TKO (knees) | 3 | | |
| 2016-11-25 | Win | (Thailand) Parita Nongprai Padpho | Rumble of the Kings 15: Awakening | Stockholm, Sweden | TKO (retirement) | 2 | | |
Won the WMC World Bantamweight title.
| 2016-09-03 | Win | (Germany) Meryem Uslu | West Coast Battle 8 | Varberg, Sweden | TKO | 4 | | |
Won the WMC European Bantamweight title.
| 2015-07-11 | Loss | (Norway) Fatima Pinto | Supremacy League 5 | Visby, Sweden | Decision (unanimous) | 3 | 3:00 | |
For the Supremacy League Bantamweight title.
| 2015-03-27 | Win | (Sweden) Dalia Ali | Rumble in Väsby | Upplands Väsby, Sweden | Decision (unanimous) | 3 | 3:00 | |
| 2014-06-07 | Loss | (Norway) Fatima Pinto | World Fighters United | Stockholm, Sweden | Decision (split) | 3 | 3:00 | |
For the WMC Nordic title.
| 2013-11-02 | Win | (Sweden) Therese Gunnarsson | West Coast Battle 5 | Varberg, Sweden | Decision (unanimous) | 3 | 3:00 | |
| 2013-04-06 | Win | (Finland) Marjo Rautanen | Chitalada Showdown 4 | Tampere, Finland | Decision (unanimous) | 3 | 3:00 | |
| 2012-10-27 | Win | (France) Judith Levi | West Coast Battle 4 | Varberg, Sweden | TKO | 4 | | |
| 2012-00-00 | Loss | (Finland) Milja Heino | Chitalada Showdown 3 | Tampere, Finland | Decision (unanimous) | 5 | 2:00 | |
| 2011-10-29 | Win | (Sweden) Linda Tjernström | West Coast Battle 3 | Varberg, Sweden | Decision (unanimous) | | | |
| 2011-09-00 | Win | (Sweden) Cecilia Eriksson | Templet Muay Thai | Stockholm, Sweden | TKO | 4 | | |
| 2011-05-00 | Win | (Sweden) Jenny Krigsman | Time to fight 2 | Mariestad, Sweden | Decision (unanimous) | | | |

Amateur kickboxing, muay thai record (Incomplete)
| Date | Result | Opponent | Event | Location | Method | Round | Time |
|---|---|---|---|---|---|---|---|
| 2018-05-19 | Win | (Thailand) Yadrung Tehirang | I.F.M.A. World Championship Tournament 2018, Final - 54 kg | Cancún, Mexico | Decision (unanimous) | 3 | 3:00 |
Won the I.F.M.A. 2018 World Championship Tournament Gold Medal -54 kg.
| 2018-05-18 | Win | (Portugal) Maria Lobo | I.F.M.A. World Championship Tournament 2018, Semi-Final - 54 kg | Cancún, Mexico | Decision (unanimous) | 3 | 3:00 |
| 2018-05-15 | Win | (Mexico) Ana Mendoza | I.F.M.A. World Championship Tournament 2018, Quarter-Final - 54 kg | Cancún, Mexico | Decision (unanimous) | 3 | 3:00 |
| 2018-02-24 | Win | (Sweden) Anna Höglund | Swedish Championship Tournament 2018, Final - 54 kg | Stockholm, Sweden | TKO | 2 | |
Won the Swedish National Championship Tournament 2018 Gold Medal -54 kg.
| 2017-10-21 | Win | (France) Juliette Lacroix | I.F.M.A. European Championship Tournament 2017, Final - 54 kg | Paris, France | TKO (knees to the body) | 3 | |
Won the I.F.M.A. 2017 European Championship Tournament Gold Medal -54 kg.
| 2017-10-19 | Win | (Belarus) Maryia Zhuk | I.F.M.A. European Championship Tournament 2017, Semi-Final - 54 kg | Paris, France | TKO (punches) | 1 | 1:20 |
| 2017-10-17 | Win | (Russia) Valeriya Drozdova | I.F.M.A. European Championship Tournament 2017, Quarter-Final - 54 kg | Paris, France | Decision (unanimous) | 3 | 3:00 |
| 2017-07-30 | Win | (Russia) Valeriya Drozdova | The World Games 2017, Final - 54 kg | Wrocław, Poland | Decision (unanimous) | 3 | 3:00 |
Won The World Games Muay Thai Tournament 2017 Gold Medal -54 kg.
| 2017-07-29 | Win | (Peru) Tristana Tola | The World Games 2017, Semi-Final - 54 kg | Wrocław, Poland | TKO (punches) | 3 | |
| 2017-07-28 | Win | (Portugal) Maria Lobo | The World Games 2017, Quarter-Final - 54 kg | Wrocław, Poland | Decision (unanimous) | 3 | 3:00 |
| 2017-02-25 | Win | (Sweden) Anna Höglund | Swedish Championship Tournament 2017, Final - 54 kg | Stockholm, Sweden | TKO | 1 | |
Won the Swedish National Championship Tournament 2017 Gold Medal -54 kg.
| 2016-05-27 | Win | (Russia) Natalya Dyachkova | I.F.M.A. World Championship Tournament 2016, Final - 54 kg | Jönköping, Sweden | Decision (unanimous) | 3 | 3:00 |
Won the I.F.M.A. 2016 World Championship Tournament Gold Medal -54 kg.
| 2016-05-26 | Win | (Morocco) Jlhan Baurukkali | I.F.M.A. World Championship Tournament 2016, Semi-Final - 54 kg | Jönköping, Sweden | TKO (knee) | 2 | 1:30 |
| 2016-05-24 | Win | (Peru) Tristana Tola | I.F.M.A. World Championship Tournament 2016, Quarter-Final - 54 kg | Jönköping, Sweden | Decision (unanimous) | 3 | 3:00 |
| 2016-05-21 | Win | (Canada) Melissa Reaume | I.F.M.A. World Championship Tournament 2016, First Round - 54 kg | Jönköping, Sweden | TKO (body kick) | 3 | |
| 2016-02-13 | Win | (Sweden) Claudia Sendlak | Swedish Championship Tournament 2016, Final - 54 kg | Varberg, Sweden | Decision (unanimous) | 3 | 3:00 |
Won the Swedish National Championship Tournament 2016 Gold Medal -54 kg.
| 2016-02-11 | Win | (Sweden) Linda Åhlström | Swedish Championship Tournament 2016, Semi-Final - 54 kg | Varberg, Sweden | TKO | 1 | |
| 2016-11-12 | Win | (Norway) Anne Line Hogstad | Nordic Championship Tournament 2016, Final - 54 kg | Oulu, Finland | TKO (punches) | 3 | |
Won the Nordic Championship Tournament 2015 Gold Medal -54 kg.
| 2015-08-16 | Win | (Estonia) Andra Aho | I.F.M.A. Royal World Cup Tournament 2015, Final - 54 kg | Bangkok, Thailand | TKO (punches) | 3 | |
Won the I.F.M.A. 2015 Royal World Cup Tournament Gold Medal -54 kg.
| 2015-08-16 | Win | (Thailand) Namtarn Por. Muangphet | I.F.M.A. Royal World Cup Tournament 2015, Semi-Final - 54 kg | Bangkok, Thailand | Decision (unanimous) | 3 | 3:00 |
| 2015-08-16 | Win | (Italy) Sveva Melillo | I.F.M.A. Royal World Cup Tournament 2015, Quarter-Final - 54 kg | Bangkok, Thailand | Decision (unanimous) | 3 | 3:00 |
| 2015-08-14 | Win | (Belarus) Alena Mishehuk | I.F.M.A. Royal World Cup Tournament 2015, First Round - 54 kg | Bangkok, Thailand | KO (punches) | 1 | |
| 2015-01-25 | Win | (Sweden) Michelle Rubin | Swedish Championship Tournament 2015, Final - 54 kg | Örebro, Sweden | TKO (punches) | 2 | |
Won the Swedish National Championship Tournament 2015 Gold Medal -54 kg.
| 2014-09-28 | Win | (Turkey) Burcu Karakis | I.F.M.A. European Championship Tournament 2014, Final - 54 kg | Kraków, Poland | TKO (knees) | 2 | |
Won the I.F.M.A. 2014 European Championship Tournament Gold Medal -54 kg.
| 2014-09-27 | Win | (Finland) Siiri Tura | I.F.M.A. European Championship Tournament 2014, Semi-Final - 54 kg | Kraków, Poland | TKO (right high kick) | 3 | |
| 2014-09-26 | Win | (Russia) Natalya Dyachkova | I.F.M.A. European Championship Tournament 2014, Quarter-Final - 54 kg | Kraków, Poland | KO (knees) | 3 | |
| 2014-05-06 | Loss | (Russia) Ovescena Kizhnerova | I.F.M.A. World Championship Tournament 2014, Semi-Final - 54 kg | Langkawi, Malaysia | Decision (unanimous) | 3 | 3:00 |
Won the I.F.M.A. 2014 World Championship Tournament Bronze Medal -54 kg.
| 2014-05-05 | Win | (Russia) Marina Zueva | I.F.M.A. World Championship Tournament 2014, Quarter-Final - 54 kg | Langkawi, Malaysia | Decision (unanimous) | 3 | 3:00 |
| 2014-05-04 | Win | (Hong Kong) Yi Sin Tang | I.F.M.A. World Championship Tournament 2014, First Round - 54 kg | Langkawi, Malaysia | KO | 3 | |
| 2014-01-18 | Win | (Sweden) Jessica Isaksson Lukashina | Swedish Championship 2014, Final - 54 kg | Umeå, Sweden | TKO | 3 | |
Won the Swedish National Championship 2014 Gold Medal -54 kg.
| 2013-08-25 | Win | (Denmark) Fatima Khattoti | Nordic Championship 2013, Final - 54 kg | Helsinki, Finland | TKO | 2 | |
Won the Nordic Championship 2013 Gold Medal -54 kg.
| 2013-08-24 | Win | | Nordic Championship 2013, Semi-Final - 54 kg | Helsinki, Finland | TKO | 1 | |
| 2013-07-27 | Loss | (Russia) Natalya Dyachkova | I.F.M.A. European Championship Tournament 2013, Final - 54 kg | Lisbon, Portugal | Decision (unanimous) | 3 | 3:00 |
Won the I.F.M.A. 2013 European Championship Tournament Silver Medal -54 kg.
| 2013-07-25 | Win | (Finland) Siiri Tura | I.F.M.A. European Championship Tournament 2013, Semi-Final - 54 kg | Lisbon, Portugal | Decision (unanimous) | 3 | 3:00 |
| 2013-07-24 | Win | (Turkey) Meltem Bas | I.F.M.A. European Championship Tournament 2013, Quarter-Final - 54 kg | Lisbon, Portugal | Decision (split) | 3 | 3:00 |
| 2013-01-25 | Win | (Sweden) Jenny Krigsman | Swedish Championship 2013, Final -54 kg | Falun, Sweden | Decision (unanimous) | 3 | 3:00 |
Won the Swedish National Championship 2013 Gold Medal -54 kg.
| 2012-12-22 | Win | (Sweden) Evelina Wikner | Swedish Championship 2013, Semi-Final -54 kg | Falun, Sweden | Decision (unanimous) | 3 | 3:00 |
| 2012-09-06 | Loss | (Belarus) Ekaterina Vandaryeva | I.F.M.A. World Championship Tournament 2012, First Round -54 kg | St. Petersburg, Russia | Decision (unanimous) | 3 | 3:00 |
| 2012-01-28 | Loss | (Sweden) Jessica Isaksson Lukashina | Swedish Championship 2012, Final -54 kg | Östersund, Sweden | Decision (unanimous) | 3 | 3:00 |
Won the Swedish National Championship Silver Medal -54 kg.
| 2012-01-14 | Win | (Sweden) Linn Wennergren | Swedish Championship 2012, Semi-Final -54 kg | Halmstad, Sweden | Decision (split) | 3 | 3:00 |
| 2011-03-05 | Win | (Sweden) Adela Persdotter | | Sweden | TKO (punches) | 1 | |
Legend: Win Loss Draw/No contest Notes
