= Anissa Meksen =

French-Algerian kickboxer

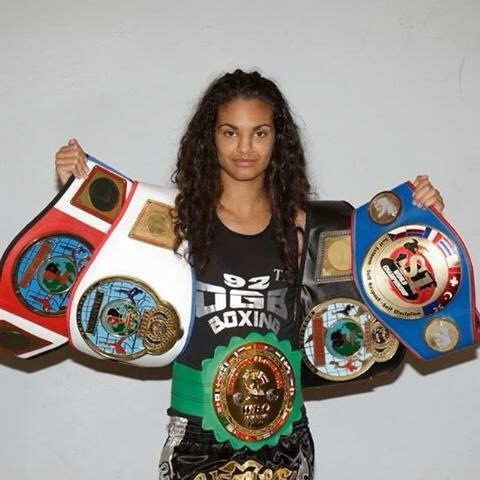
- Meksen in 2014
- Born: 29 April 1988 (age 38); Nancy, France
- Height: 1.68 m (5 ft 6 in)
- Weight: 52 kg (115 lb; 8.2 st)
- Division: Bantamweight; Super Bantamweight
- Style: Savate, Muay Thai, Kickboxing, boxing
- Team: Team OGB
- Trainer: Benoit Zede
- Years active: 2001–present

Professional boxing record
- Total: 2
- Wins: 2
- By knockout: 0
- Losses: 0

Kickboxing record
- Total: 111
- Wins: 104
- By knockout: 33
- Losses: 7

Anissa Meksen (Arabic: أنيسة مكسن; born 29 April 1988) is a French-Algerian professional kickboxer, Muay Thai fighter, Savateur, and boxer. Known for her versatile fighting style which is characterized by her sharp striking, footwork, and ring intelligence, Meksen is regarded as one of the greatest kickboxers of her generation.

In 2008, Meksen won the Night of Champions tournament. In 2013, she won the S1 World title. In 2014, she won the WBC European Muay Thai title (-53 kg), the WPMF World Muay Thai title (-52 kg), and the Enfusion K-1 Tournament. The following year, she won the WFC European Muay Thai title (-52 kg) when she beat Yolande Alonso via technical knockout in the second round. In 2016, she won the vacant WBC World Muay Thai title (-53 kg) and the WAKO PRO Flyweight World title. The following year, she won the ISKA Bantamweight World title, the AFSO K-1 Rules Bantamweight World title (-53.5 kg), and the Glory Women's Super Bantamweight Championship. She challenged for the interim ONE Women's Atomweight Kickboxing World Championship in 2023 and the inaugural ONE Women's Strawweight Kickboxing World Championship in 2024. As a professional boxer, she won the vacant France Female Super Bantamweight title in 2017.

In 2014, Meksen was named MUAYTHAITV's Fighter of the Year, while Awakening Fighters awarded her their Fighter of the Year, Inspirational Fighter of the Year, and KO of the Year (vs. Adi Rotem). In 2017, she was also Combat Press's Fighter of the Year, and Glory's Newcomer of the Year.

== Martial arts career ==
=== Early career ===
In 2008 Meksen participated in the Nuit de Champions tournament. In the quarter-final bout, she defeated Maiva Hamadouche. In the semi-finals, she defeated Jacqueline Beroud. In the final bout of the tournament, she fought and won a unanimous decision against Cyrielle Girodias.

During World Muaythai Auspicious Celebration, Meksen fought Monoprangroj Kampetch for the S1 Savante Bantamweight title. She won a unanimous decision.

After winning her next two fights, Meksen challenged Sor Tawanrung Kwanjai for the WPMF World Muay Thai title. Meksen lost by decision.

Meksen won her next two fights, before once against contesting the WPMF World Muay Thai title, this time against Hongthong Liangbrasert. Meksen won the fight by unanimous decision.

In 2014, she participated in the season five of Enfusion Reality: Victory of the Vixen. Meksen won her first three fight and faced Iman Barlow in the finals. She won the fight with a stunning second round KO.

Meksen then had a five fight winning streak, before contesting the WFC European Bantamweight Muay Thai title against Yolande Alonso. She won the fight by a high kick KO in the second round.

She then entered the 2015 Kunlun K-1 Bantamweight Tournament. After beating Kailin Ren in the quarter-finals, and Xu Zhurong in the semi-finals, she faced E Meidie in the finals. She would lose the final bout by decision, after two extra rounds.

After another five fight winning streak, she was scheduled to fight Therese Gunnarsson for the WAKO World K1 Bantamweight title. She would win a unanimous decision.

Meksen would win her next five fights before fighting Chiara Vincis for the ISKA World Bantamweight title. Meksen won a unanimous decision.

=== Glory Kickboxing ===
In 2017 she fought Funda Diken Alkayis in the Glory Super Bantamweight Conteder Fight. Meksen won by TKO in the third round.

In 2017 Anissa Meksen defeated Tiffany van Soest to win the Glory title.

Her first title defense was scheduled to be against Amel Dehby. Meksen won the fight by a unanimous decision.

During Glory 56: Denver she faced Jady Menezes in her second title defense. Meksen lost a highly controversial split decision, that would be dubbed the "Robbery of the Year" by Combat Press. Meksen would regain the title in a rematch three months later by way of TKO.

In the first title defense of her second reign, Meksen faced Tiffany van Soest. Meksen won the fight by a split decision. In her second title defense, she faced Sofia Olofsson. She won the fight by TKO, after the doctor stopped the fight after just two minutes.

During Glory 71: Chicago she rematched Tiffany van Soest. Meksen would lose a unanimous decision.

On August 23, 2020, it was reported that Meksen had signed with ONE Championship.

=== ONE Championship ===
During ONE On TNT IV, Chatri Sityodtong announced that Meksen will make her promotional debut in a women's strawweight kickboxing-bout against Italian kickboxer and Nak Muay Featherweight Martine Michieletto, on May 28, 2021, at ONE Empower. The whole card will be female fighters only. Meksen was later rescheduled to face fellow promotional newcomer Cristina Morales, on September 3, 2021. She won the fight by a second-round knockout.

Meksen faced Marie Ruumet in a Muay Thai bout at ONE 156 on April 22, 2022. She won the fight by a dominant unanimous decision. Meksen called out the reigning ONE atomweight kickboxing champion Janet Todd in her post-fight interview, saying: "I want Janet Todd next for the title shot in kick-boxing".

Meksen faced Dangkongfah Banchamek at ONE on Prime Video 2 on September 30, 2022. At the weigh-ins, Dangkongfah Banchamek weighed in at 115.25 pounds, 0.25 lbs over the atomweight non-title fight limit. Dangkongfah was fined 20% of their purse, which went to their opponent Meksen. After the weigh-ins, ONE Championship posted a video to social media, showing Meksen returning the 20% back to Banchamek as a sign of respect for taking the fight. Meksen won the fight by unanimous decision.

During her in-ring interview with Mitch Chilson following her victory over Dangkongfah Banchamek, ONE Championship announced Meksen would face Stamp Fairtex in a Mixed Rules-bout at ONE on Prime Video 6 on January 14, 2023, at the Impact, Muang Thong Thani in Bangkok. However, Meksen failed to appear at the weigh-ins and the fight was scrapped, with Fairtex instead being matched up against Anna "Supergirl" Jaroonsak in a kickboxing bout.

After Meksen failed to appear, Stamp Fairtex told South China Morning Post she deemed Meksen unprofessional for not showing up, with her camp going as far as to say that they saw Meksen fail to make weight by 3 kilograms. They were quoted by the CEO of ONE Championship during his interview with the same publication. Meksen responded by reminding the fans that she did not appear due to a family issue and that she would be interested in fighting Fairtex for the Interim ONE Atomweight Kickboxing Championship at ONE on Prime Video 7, after being "shocked" to find out that there would be no decision in her exhibition Mixed Rules-bout, if the fight had no winner after the regulated time, which she would never agree to if she knew in advance. Meksen had recently expressed frustrations with the promotion after not getting a fight with Janet Todd and the Interim Kickboxing title would resolve this issue after waiting for 3 years, but after negotiations with her husband/trainer and the CEO of ONE Championship fell through, Meksen decided to leave the promotion and Bangkok. Meksen was also unhappy with CEO Chatri Sityodtong stating: “He was aware of the situation but preferred to announce that I was ‘unwell’ to clear his name and not take responsibility for my absence at the conference. I have been unhappy since I signed with them and I have cried a lot about them. I love what I do, I am a real enthusiast and I have always given everything for my sport and my performance. I have been more than patient but when respect is not at the table we have to leave it.”

On March 1, 2023, it was reported that Meksen had signed with ARES Fighting Championship, and was due to make her MMA debut at ARES FC 15 on May 11, 2023 against Jaciane Figueiredo. However the bout was later postponed due to Meksen's ongoing legal dispute with ONE Championship. On October 31, 2023, it was announced that Meksen would face Phetjee Jaa Or.Meekun for the interim ONE Women's Atomweight Kickboxing World Championship at ONE Friday Fights 46 on December 22, 2023. She lost the close bout via unanimous decision.

Meksen was expected to face Jackie Buntan for the inaugural ONE Women's Strawweight Kickboxing World Championship on July 6, 2024, at ONE Fight Night 23. Buntan withdrew with an undisclosed injury on June 20. The bout was rescheduled on November 9, 2024, at ONE 169. She lost the fight by unanimous decision.

Meksen faced Kana Morimoto on December 20, 2024, at ONE Friday Fights 92. She won the fight by a unanimous decision.

== Championships and accomplishments ==
=== Kickboxing ===
- Glory
  - Glory Women's Super Bantamweight (-55.38 kg/122 lb) Championship (two times; former)
    - Three successful title defenses (across two reigns)
- International Sport Karate Association
  - 2017 ISKA K-1 Bantamweight (-54.5 kg/120 lb) World Championship
- All Fight System Organization
  - 2017 AFSO World Super Bantamweight (-55.38 kg/122 lb) K-1 Rules Championship
- World Association of Kickboxing Organizations
  - 2016 WAKO PRO Flyweight (-52 kg/114.6 lb) World Championship
- Kunlun Fight
  - 2015 Kunlun K-1 Tournament Runner-up (-52 kg/114.6 lb)
- Enfusion
  - 2014 Enfusion Reality Season 5 K-1 Tournament Winner (-54 kg/119 lb)

=== Muay Thai ===
- Onesongchai
  - 2013 S1 World Champion
- World Fighting Championship
  - 2015 WFC European Championship (-52 kg/114.6 lb)
- Venum Muay Thai
  - 2015 Venum Championship (-54 kg/119 lb)
- World Professional Muaythai Federation
  - 2014 WPMF Muay Thai World Championship (-54 kg/119 lb)
- World Boxing Council Muaythai
  - 2016 WBC World Muay Thai title (-53 kg/116.8 lb)
  - 2014 WBC European Muay Thai Championship (-53 kg/116.8 lb)

=== Savate ===
- Savate Championships
  - Savate World Champion
  - Savate European Champion
  - Savate French Champion

=== Boxing ===
- Federation Francaise de Boxe (French Boxing Federation)
  - France Super Bantamweight (55.34 kg/122 lb) Championship (one time; current)

== Kickboxing and Muay Thai record ==
Kickboxing & Muay Thai record
104 Wins (33 (T)KO's), 7 Losses , 0 Draw
Date	Result	Opponent	Event	Location	Method	Round	Time
2024-12-07	Win	(Japan) Kana	ONE Friday Fights 92, Lumpinee Stadium	Bangkok, Thailand	Decision (Unanimous)	3	3:00
2024-11-09	Loss	(United States) Jackie Buntan	ONE 169	Bangkok, Thailand	Decision (Unanimous)	5	3:00
For the inaugural ONE Women's Strawweight Kickboxing World Championship.
2023-12-22	Loss	(Thailand) Petchjeeja Lukjaoporongtom	ONE Friday Fights 46, Lumpinee Stadium	Bangkok, Thailand	Decision (Unanimous)	5	3:00
For the interim ONE Women's Atomweight Kickboxing World Championship.
2022-10-01	Win	(Thailand) Dangkongfah Banchamek	ONE on Prime Video 2	Kallang, Singapore	Decision (Unanimous)	3	3:00
2022-04-22	Win	(Estonia) Marie Ruumet	ONE 156	Kallang, Singapore	Decision (Unanimous)	3	3:00
2021-09-03	Win	(Spain) Cristina Morales	ONE Championship: Empower	Kallang, Singapore	KO (Left hook)	2	2:27
2020-02-29	Win	(South Korea) Ji Waen Lee	Glory 75: Utrecht	Utrecht, Netherlands	TKO (Corner stoppage/Injury)	2	3:00
2019-11-22	Loss	(United States) Tiffany van Soest	Glory 71: Chicago	Chicago, United States	Decision (Unanimous)	5	3:00
Lost the Glory Women's Super Bantamweight Championship.
2019-06-22	Win	(Sweden) Sofia Olofsson	Glory 66: Paris	Paris, France	TKO (Doctor stoppage)	1	2:06
Retained the Glory Women's Super Bantamweight Championship.
2019-03-09	Win	(United States) Tiffany van Soest	Glory 64: Strasbourg	Strasbourg, France	Decision (Split)	5	3:00
Retained the Glory Women's Super Bantamweight Championship.
2018-11-02	Win	(Brazil) Jady Menezes	Glory 61: New York	New York City, United States	TKO (Punches)	2	0:39
Won the Glory Women's Super Bantamweight Championship.
2018-08-10	Loss	(Brazil) Jady Menezes	Glory 56: Denver	Broomfield, United States	Decision (Split)	5	3:00
Lost the Glory Women's Super Bantamweight Championship.
2018-05-12	Win	(France) Amel Dehby	Glory 53: Lille	Lille, France	Decision (Unanimous)	5	3:00
Retained the Glory Women's Super Bantamweight Championship.
2018-03-31	Win	(Canada) Ashley Nichols	Glory 52: Los Angeles	Los Angeles, United States	Decision (Unanimous)	3	3:00
Non-title Superfight.
2017-12-01	Win	(United States) Tiffany van Soest	Glory 48: New York	New York City, United States	Decision (Unanimous)	5	3:00
Won the Glory Women's Super Bantamweight Championship.
2017-10-28	Win	(Turkey) Funda Diken Alkayis	Glory 47: Lyon	Lyon, France	TKO (Foot injury)	3	0:17
Glory Women’s Super Bantamweight Contender Fight.
2017-07-14	Win	(Brazil) Jady Menezes	Glory 43: New York	New York City, United States	Decision (Unanimous)	3	3:00
2017-06-03	Win	(France) Fadma Basrir	Fighters 3: The Way Of The Champions	Oberkorn, Luxembourg	Decision (Unanimous)	5	3:00
Won the AFSO K-1 Rules Bantamweight World title (-53.5 kg).
2017-05-20	Win	(Italy) Gloria Peritore	La Nuit De L'Impact III	Saintes, France	Decision (unanimous)	3	3:00
2017-04-08	Win	(Italy) Chiara Vincis	Victory World Series: Oktagon Torino	Turin, Italy	Decision (unanimous)	5	3:00
Won the ISKA Bantamweight World title.
2017-03-18	Win	(Belarus) Elena Mishchuk	La Nuit Des Titans 2017	Tours, France	Decision	3	3:00
2017-02-04	Win	(Portugal) Maria Lobo	Muay Thai Emperor Chok Dee	Vandœuvre-lès-Nancy, France	Decision	3	3:00
2016-11-19	Win	(Greece) Fani Peloumpi	Radikal Fight Night Gold	Charleville-Mézières, France	Decision	3	3:00
2016-10-29	Win	(Turkey) Dilara Yildiz	Best Of Siam IX	Paris, France	TKO	5	
2016-06-24	Win	(Sweden) Therese Gunnarsson	Monte Carlo Fighting Masters	Monte Carlo, Monaco	Decision (unanimous)	5	3:00
Won the WAKO PRO Flyweight World title.
2016-04-30	Win	(Norway) Fatima Pinto	Kerner Thai	Paris, France	Decision (unanimous)	3	3:00
2016-03-26	Win	(Germany) Meryem Uslu	Master Fight	Chalon-sur-Saône, France	Decision (unanimous)	3	3:00
Won the vacant WBC World Muay Thai title (-53 kg).
2016-03-12	Win	(Italy) Donatella Panu	La Nuit des Titans 2016	Tours, France	Decision	3	3:00
2016-01-16	Win	(France) Camilla Paiva Rosario	Muay Thai Attitude IV	Conflans-Sainte-Honorine, France	TKO (doctor stoppage)	2	
2015-11-28	Win	(Portugal) Maria Lobo	K-1 Victory World Series	Levallois-Perret, France	Decision	3	3:00
2015-10-28	Loss	(China) E Meidie	Kunlun Fight 32	Foshan, China	TKO (retirement)	5	
Kunlun K-1 Tournament Finals.
2015-10-28	Win	(China) Xu Zhurong	Kunlun Fight 32	Foshan, China	Decision (unanimous)	3	3:00
Kunlun K-1 Tournament Semi-Finals.
2015-08-22	Win	(Poland) Sylwia Juśkiewicz	Venum Victory World Series 3	Debrecen, Hungary	Decision (unanimous)	3	3:00
Venum K-1 title (-54 kg).
2015-07-18	Win	(China) Kailin Ren	Kunlun Fight 27	Nanjing, China	Decision (unanimous)	3	3:00
Kunlun K-1 Tournament Quarter-Finals.
2015-05-30	Win	(France) Yolande Alonso	Road to Bangkok III	Cernier, Switzerland	TKO (high kick)	2	
Won WFC European Muay Thai title (-52 kg).
2015-05-23	Win	(Netherlands) Feride Kirat	Radikal Fight Night 3	Charleville-Mézières, France	TKO (3 knockdowns)	3	3:00
2015-04-18	Win	(Spain) Eva Naranjo	Enfusion Live 27	Tenerife, Spain	Decision (unanimous)	3	3:00
2015-03-14	Win	(Netherlands) Isis Verbeek	Enfusion Live 25: Fight Night 1st Edition	Turnhout, Belgium	Decision (unanimous)	3	3:00
2015-02-07	Win	(Thailand) Phet Yodying	La Nuit des Titans 2015	Tours, France	KO (punches)	3	
2014-12-13	Win	(France) Yolande Alonso	Victory K-1	Levallois-Perret, France	Decision (unanimous)	3	3:00
2014-09-23	Win	(United Kingdom) Iman Barlow	Enfusion Reality Season 5: Victory of the Vixen	Ko Samui, Thailand	KO (left hook)	2	2:28
Enfusion K-1 Tournament Final.
2014-09-23	Win	(Canada) Ashley Nichols	Enfusion Reality Season 5: Victory of the Vixen	Ko Samui, Thailand	Decision (unanimous)	3	3:00
Enfusion K-1 Tournament Semi-Finals.
2014-09-23	Win	(Sweden) Johanna Rydberg	Enfusion Reality Season 5: Victory of the Vixen	Ko Samui, Thailand	TKO (knee to the body)	1	1:11
Enfusion K-1 Tournament Quarter-Finals.
2014-09-18	Win	(Israel) Adi Rotem	Enfusion Reality Season 5: Victory of the Vixen	Ko Samui, Thailand	KO (left hook)	1	2:02
Enfusion K-1 Tournament First Round.
2014-07-28	Win	(Thailand) Hongthong Liangbrasert	WPMF Muay Thai Championships	Bangkok, Thailand	Decision (unanimous)	5	2:00
Won WPMF World Muay Thai title (-52 kg).
2014-04-12	Win	(France) Alicia Mermoux	Fight Night One	Saint-Étienne, France	TKO (corner stoppage)	3	
2014-03-08	Win	(Turkey) Funda Diken Alkayis	Le Choc des Légendes	Vannes, France	TKO (referee stoppage)	3	
Won WBC European Muay Thai title (-53 kg).
2013-12-27	Loss	(Thailand) Kwanjai Sor Tawanrung	Klongsarn Muay Thai	Bangkok, Thailand	Decision	5	2:00
For WPMF World Muay Thai title.
2013-10-26	Win	(Italy) Ilaria Stivanello	Choc des guerriers 3 (K-1)	L'Isle-d'Espagnac, France	TKO (low kicks)	3	
2013-10-11	Win	(France) Soraya Bucherie	Warriors Night	Paris, France	Decision (unanimous)	3	2:00
2013-08-12	Win	(Thailand) Monoprangroj Kampetch	Queen's Birthday Event	Bangkok, Thailand	Decision (unanimous)	5	2:00
Won S1 World title.
2013-07-05	Win	(United States) Clarissa Padua	Super Big Match - Muay Thai	Patong, Thailand	KO (left high kick and punch)	3	
2013-04-06	Loss	(France) Katia Semail	7e Trophée Des Etoiles	Aix-en-Provence, France	Decision	3	3:00
For French National K-1 title.
2009-05-23	Win	(France) Jacqueline Beroud	France Elite 2009: Combats Féminin	Paris, France	Decision (unanimous)	3	2:00
2008-11-08	Win	(France) Cyrielle Girodias	Night of the Champions II / Nuit de Champions 2008	Paris, France	Decision (majority)	3	2:00
Won the Night of Champions tournament.
2008-11-08	Win	(France) Jacqueline Beroud	Night of the Champions II / Nuit de Champions 2008	Paris, France	Decision (unanimous)	3	2:00
2008-11-08	Win	(France) Maiva Hamadouche	Night of the Champions II / Nuit de Champions 2008	Paris, France	Decision (unanimous)	3	2:00
Legend: Win Loss Draw/No contest Notes

== Professional boxing record ==
2 Wins (0 knockouts, 2 decisions), 0 Losses
Res.	Record	Opponent	Type	Rd., Time	Date	Location	Notes
Win	2-0	(France) Fatima El Kabouss	UD	8	2017-12-14	Palais des sports Marcel-Cerdan, Levallois-Perret, Paris, France	Won vacant France Female Super Bantamweight title.
Win	1-0	(Hungary) Gabriella Mezei	PTS	6	2017-04-22	Astroballe, Villeurbanne, Lyon, France	

== Filmography ==
Film
Year	Title	Role	Notes
2016	Goodbye Darling, I'm Off to Fight	Herself	
