= Meryem Uslu =

German kickboxer (born 1987)

- Born: February 13, 1987 (age 39); Stuttgart, West Germany
- Other names: Mergen
- Nationality: German
- Height: 5 ft 4 in (163 cm)
- Weight: 125 lb (57 kg; 8 st 13 lb)
- Division: Bantamweight
- Style: Muay Thai
- Fighting out of: Stuttgart, Germany
- Team: Kwan Gym

Kickboxing record
- Total: 57
- Wins: 43
- By knockout: 15
- Losses: 13
- By knockout: 2
- Draws: 1

Other information
- Boxing record from BoxRec

Meryem Uslu (born 13 February 1987) is a German female kickboxer who has fought for the Glory kickboxing title against Tiffany van Soest. She is the former Wu Lin Feng World 55 kg champion.

== Kickboxing career ==
In 2012 Uslu fought Lucy Payne for the KORE MMA Bantamweight Muay thai title. Payne defended the title by a unanimous decision. Later in the year, she fought Caley Reece for the WMC Women's World Featherweight Championship. Reece won the fight by unanimous decision. She also challenged Kim Dewulf for the IMC Muay Thai World title. Uslu won by unanimous decision.

In 2014 she fought Yang Yang for the Wu Lin Feng 55 kg title. Uslu won the title by a unanimous decision. In her next fight she fought Carol Earl for the WKF World 54.5 kg title. Uslu won the fight by unanimous decision. Uslu entered the Enfusion Season 5 Tournament, but lost to Marina Zueva in the first round.

Uslu made her first title defense of the Wu Lin Feng title against Xu Zhurong during Day of Destruction 10, and won a unanimous decision.

Uslu fought Anissa Meksen for the vacant WBC Muaythai World Bantamweight championship, but failed to win title.

In 2017 Uslu fought for two world titles. She first challenged Iman Barlow during Lion Fight 34 for the Lion Fight Super Bantamweight World title, but lost the fight by unanimous decision. Her second title challenge was for the Glory Women's Super Bantamweight Championship, but lost in the fourth round by TKO.

== Championships and accomplishments ==
=== Professional ===
- World Kickboxing Federation
  - WKF Kickboxing World Champion (-54.5 kg)
- Wu Lin Feng
  - WLF Kickboxing World Champion (-55 kg)
- International Muaythai Council
  - IMC Muay Thai World Champion

=== Amateur ===
- World Kickboxing Association
  - 2010 WKA German Kickboxing Champion
- International Phetjan Thaiboxing Association
  - 2006 IPTA German Amateur Muay Thai Champion
  - 2007 IPTA European Muay Thai Champion (-56.7 kg)
- Regional titles
  - 2007 European Amateur Muay Thai Champion
  - 2008 German National Muay Thai Champion

== Kickboxing record ==
Professional kickboxing record (incomplete)
43 wins (15 KOs), 13 loss, 1 draw
Date	Result	Opponent	Event	Location	Method	Round	Time
2018-03-11	Loss	(Norway) Anne Line Hogstad	Get in the Ring 18	Hamburg, Germany	Decision (Unanimous)	3	3:00
2017-08-25	Loss	(United States) Tiffany van Soest	Glory 44: Chicago	Hoffman Estates, Illinois	TKO (punches)	4	0:36
For the Glory Women's Super Bantamweight Championship.
2017-04-08	Loss	(Poland) Malgorzata Dymus	Ladies Fight Night: Five Points	Poznan, Poland	Decision (split)	3	3:00
2017-03-03	Loss	(France) Soraya Bucherie	Muay Thai Spirit	Paris, France	Decision (majority)	3	3:00
2017-02-03	Loss	(England) Iman Barlow	Lion Fight 34	Las Vegas, Nevada, United States	Decision (unanimous)	5	3:00
For the Lion Fight Super Bantamweight World title.
2016-11-19	Win	(Italy) Patrizia Gibelli	Get in the Ring 2016	Hamburg, Germany	Points	3	3:00
2016-11-07	Win	(Poland) Malgorzata Dymus	K-1 event in Germany	Hamburg, Germany	KO	3	
2016-10-08	Win	(France) Soraya Bucherie	Day Of The Fight XIV	Rostock, Germany	Decision (unanimous)	5	2:00
2016-09-03	Loss	(Sweden) Sofia Olofsson	West Coast Battle 8	Varberg, Sweden	TKO	4	
For the WMC European Bantamweight title.
2016-06-17	Win	(China) Li Huang	Muay Thai Event in China	Zhengzhou, China	Points	3	2:00
2016-03-26	Loss	(France) Anissa Meksen	Master Fight	Chalon-sur-Saône, France	Decision (unanimous)	3	3:00
For the vacant WBC World Muay Thai title (-53 kg).
2015-10-03	Draw	(Portugal) Maria Lobo	Day of the Fight XII	Cologne, Germany	Draw (majority)	5	2:00
2015-04-18	Win	(China) Xu Zhurong	Day of Destruction 10	Hamburg, Germany	Decision (unanimous)	5	2:00
Retained the WLF 55 kg World title.
2015-03-07	Win	(Poland) Malgorzata Dymus	Get in the Ring 2015	Hamburg, Germany	KO (knee)	3	
2014-10-18	Win	(Netherlands) Kelsey van de Poll	Muay Thai event in Germany	Berlin, Germany	Points	3	2:00
2014-09-18	Loss	(Russia) Marina Zueva	EnfusionReality Season 5: Victory of the Vixen	Ko Samui, Thailand	Decision	5	2:00
Tournament First Round.
2014-05-30	Win	(Australia) Carol Earl	Thunder Downunder	Sydney, Australia	Decision (split)	5	3:00
Won the WKF 54.5 kg World title.
2014-05-10	Win	(China) Yang Yang	Day of Destruction 8	Hamburg, Germany	Decision (unanimous)	5	2:00
Won the WLF 55 kg World title.
2013-09-14	Win	(Germany) Lisa Schewe	Day of Destruction 7	Hamburg, Germany	Decision (unanimous)	5	2:00
2013-06-01	Loss	(Greece) Marianna Kalergi	Muay Thai event in Greece	Greece	Points	3	2:00
2012-12-08	Win	(Belgium) Kim Dewulf	Kickmas Fight Night 2012	Hamburg, Germany	Decision (unanimous)	5	2:00
Won the IMC Muay Thai World title.
2012-10-13	Loss	(Australia) Caley Reece	Epic Fight Promotions 7: Staunch	Perth, Australia	Decision (unanimous)	5	2:00
For the WMC Women's World Featherweight (-57.1 kg/126 lb) Championship.
2012-09-01	Loss	(Turkey) Dilara Yildiz	Mix Fight Gala 13	Frankfurt, Germany	Points	3	2:00
2012-06-09	Win	(Netherlands) Daisy Breinburg	Muay Thai Event in Germany	Rostock, Germany	Points	3	3:00
2012-04-28	Win	(China) Jin Tang	Day of Destruction 5	Hamburg, Germany	Points	3	3:00
2012-04-13	Win	(Czech Republic) Anna Plavanova	K-1 event in Czech Republic	Prague, Czech Republic	Decision (unanimous)	3	3:00
2012-03-24	Loss	(England) Lucy Payne	KORE MMA	Cornwall, England	Decision (unanimous)	5	3:00
For the KORE MMA Bantamweight Muay Thai title.
2012-02-09	Win	(Netherlands) Gezina Arets	Muay Thai event in Holland	Netherlands	Points	3	2:00
2011-06-11	Win	(Canada) Jessica Gladstone	Journey Fight Series III	Calgary, Alberta, Canada	Decision (unanimous)	3	3:00
2011-05-07	Loss	(England) Iman Barlow	Muay Thai event in England	Leicestershire, England	Points	3	3:00
2011-02-13	Win	(Netherlands) Allison Klok	Girl Fights Only VI	Wormer, Netherlands	Decision	3	3:00
2010-11-13	Win	(Netherlands) Maritzarda Hersisia	Gala te Puurs	Netherlands	Points	3	3:00
2010-09-05	Win	(Netherlands) Samantha Middeljans	Humans Fight Night IV	Hamburg, Germany	Points	3	3:00
2010-05-12	Win	(Indonesia) Soraya Haurissa	K-1 event		TKO	4	
2010-03-27	Win	(Netherlands) Maritzarda Hersisia	Battle of the South 8	Hoensbroeck, Netherlands	TKO	1	
2010-03-06	Win	(Germany) Sibel Fischer	WKN Germany: Fight Night in Kiel	Kiel, Germany	TKO	1	
2007-12-01	Win	(Greece) Marianna Kalergi	Muay Thai event in Germany	Hamburg, Germany	Points	3	2:00
Won European Muay Thai title.
2007-03-25	Loss	(Lithuania) Akvile Vitkauskaite	Muay Thai event in Northern Ireland	Belfast, Northern Ireland	Decision	3	2:00
Legend: Win Loss Draw/No contest Notes

== See also ==
- List of female kickboxers
