= African Muaythai Championships =

- Sport: Muay Thai

The African Muaythai Championships are annual Muay Thai competitions organised by the International Federation of Muaythai Associations (IFMA).

== Location of the African Muaythai Championships ==
| Edition | Year | Dates | Host city | Host Country | Winners |
|---|---|---|---|---|---|
| 1 | 2017 | 14 to 17 of December 2017 | Kenitra | Morocco | Morocco |
| 2 | 2021 | 10 to 14 November 2021 | Cairo | Egypt | Morocco |
| 3 | 2024 | 20 to 25 February 2024. | Cairo | Egypt | Morocco |
| 4 | 2025 | 15 to 18 April 2025 | Tripoli | Libya | Morocco |

== See also ==
- IFMA World Muaythai Championships
