= 2017 African Muaythai Championships =

The 2017 African Muaythai Championships took place in Kenitra, Morocco from 14 to 17 of December 2017.

== Medalists ==
=== Men ===
| Event | Gold | Silver | Bronze |
|---|---|---|---|
| -51 kg | Morocco Walid Senoussi | | |
| -54 kg | Morocco Essam Boukdir | | |
| -57 kg | Morocco Mohamed Bernoussi | | |
| -60 kg | | | Morocco Badr Hamzaoui |
| -63.5 kg | Morocco Mehdi Oubahmo | | |
| -67 kg | Morocco Mohamed Maghri | | |
| -71 kg | Morocco Ahmed Abu Al Wafaa | | |
| -75 kg | Morocco Ayoub Lamkadam | | |
| -81 kg | Morocco Soufiane Merzak | | |
| -86 kg | | | Morocco Ahmed El Kolali |
| -91 kg | Morocco Othmane El Fekaki | | |
| +91 kg | Morocco Abdessamed Al-Bari | | |

=== Women ===
| Event | Gold | Silver | Bronze |
|---|---|---|---|
| -48 kg | | | |
| -51 kg | | | |
| -54 kg | Morocco Meryem Moubarik | | |
| -57 kg | Morocco Sakina Al-Naili | | |
| -60 kg | | | |
| -63.5 kg | | | |

== Medal table ==
| POS | Delegation | Gold | Silver | Bronze | Total |
|---|---|---|---|---|---|
| 1 | Morocco | 12 | 0 | 2 | 14 |
| 2 | Tunisia | 1 | 2 | 1 | 4 |
| 3 | Libya | 1 | 0 | 2 | 3 |
