= Stephan Fox =

German martial artist

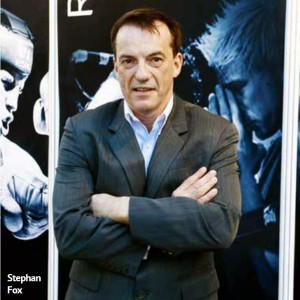
- Stephan Fox
- Born: Stefan Joerg Fuchs; Born 1963 in Germany
- Other names: The Fox
- Occupations: President of AIMS President of UTS Vice-President of SportAccord General Secretary of IFMA Vice-President of WMC
- Website: http://wmcmuaythai.org http://ifmamuaythai.org

Stephan Fox (born 1963 in Germany) is a German sporting figure. He is the current General Secretary of International Federation of Muaythai Amateur and vice-president of the World Muaythai Council. Fox is also the Vice-president SportAccord and the President of the Alliance of Independent Recognised Members of Sport (AIMS) representing 23 international federations.

== Early life ==
Stephan has been involved in ring sports and Muaythai in the late 70s. He won titles such as the South Pacific, Intercontinental and World titles. Stephan won the Australian Martial Art award and has been presented with the Thai equivalent. He has also won the North QLD Sports Personality Award and has represented both Germany and Australia throughout his fighting career.

== IFMA and WMC ==
Fox retired in 1995, was asked by the late General Vorayudh Mesommonta to join the WMC and IFMA to help with international affairs. He is an advocate of Thailand's national sport and combat art. His educational background is rooted both in both Germany and Australia, however he now resides in Thailand where he oversees the growth of both Amateur (IFMA) and Professional (WMC) Muaythai.

Fox holds the position of General Secretary of IFMA and the vice-president of the WMC and in the last few years, he has helped to lead Muaythai to its current world status being recognized by SportAccord, IWGA, FISU and being included in many Olympic and non-Olympic multi-sport events.

== TV appearances ==
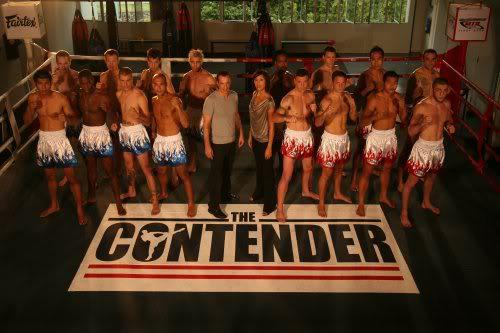
Contender

Fox has been a part of more than a hundred TV shows as host commentator and TV celebrity. He has been seen as the mentor / host of The Contender Asia, a celebrity trainer on The Biggest Loser Asia, a mentor and host on AXN number one rated, Emmy nominated show The Challenger Muaythai, and has been the host of many Muaythai TV Shows such as Muaythai Fight Night shown on ESPN, Fox Sports and TrueVisions. Stephan Fox has also been featured on the cover of a number of international martial art magazines such as Blitz, International Kick-boxer, Martial Arts World and Muaythai World.

== Charitable works ==
Fox has been involved in youth development programs through the Muaythai Against Drugs (MAD) program established by Privy Councillor to HM the King of Thailand, General Pichitr Kullavanijaya. Under the patronage of the Peace and Sport and IOC, Fox helped found the 'Sport is your Gang' campaign, to motivate, change and raise awareness of the danger of gang affiliation in youths andDo Good Feel Good campaign in which the world's leading Muaythai celebrities do charity and work with troubled youths to help them find the right path in life. He also has been involved in projects run in conjunctions with

Fox has been one of the main driving forces behind the collaboration between the UN Women and Muaythai's UNiTE to End Violence Against Women campaign; a joint campaign in which an MoU was signed in April 2013. Later on in 2014, the "Sport is Your Gang" campaign was awarded the "Spirit of Sport" award, the most prestigious award for using the power of sport to make a difference, at the 2014 SportAccord Convention in Belek, Turkey.

== Speaker and advocate ==
As a leader of SportAccord Martial Arts Group, Fox oversees 15 Olympic and non-Olympic combat sports. He was a guest speaker the World Cultural Martial Art Forum in Beijing (World Combat Games 2010) during the 1st SportAccord Combat Games as well as numerous editions of the annual IF Forum hosted by SportAccord Convention in conjunction with SportAccord, ASOIF and AIOWF. Fox was also nominated to oversee all ring sports for the 2013 games, held in St. Petersburg, Russia. He has also been one of the main persons in the organization of over 10 World Championship events held in Thailand, Korea, Uzbekistan, Kazakhstan, Russia, Malaysia and other countries around the world. Fox often promotes Muaythai by holding official seminars, workshops.
