= Ekaterina Vandaryeva =

Belarusian kickboxer (born 1991)

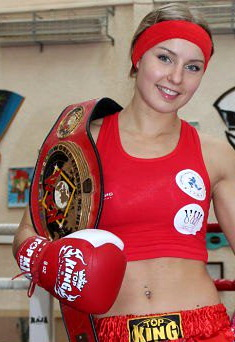
- Born: January 20, 1991 (age 35); Staryya Darohi, Belarus
- Other names: Barbie
- Height: 5 ft 7 in (1.70 m)
- Weight: 125 lb (57 kg; 8.9 st)
- Division: Featherweight
- Reach: 71 in (180 cm)
- Style: Kickboxing, Muay Thai
- Stance: Orthodox
- Team: Kick Fighter Gym
- Trainer: Andrei Kulebin
- Years active: 2009–present

Kickboxing record
- Total: 70
- Wins: 58
- By knockout: 16
- Losses: 11
- Draws: 1

Other information
- University: Belarusian State University of Physical Training

Ekaterina Vandaryeva (born January 20, 1991) is a Belarusian kickboxer who defeated future UFC champion Joanna Jędrzejczyk in a controversial judges' decision to become the WKN champion in 2011.

== Career ==
Before participating in Muay Thai, Ekaterina Vandaryeva had been involved in volleyball, athletics, self-defense. She graduated from the school of choreography.

Vandaryeva began kickboxing at age 16, in 2007, with the Minsk club "Kick Fighter Gym" Ekaterina Vandaryeva wanted to enter the Police Academy, but later chose the Belarusian State University of Physical Training (specializing in tourism management); which she graduated in 2013.

Vandaryeva first coaches were World and European champions Andrei Kulebin and Andrei Kotsur. The first professional fight Vandaryeva participated in was in Cyprus against a Greek. She became a World Champion for the first time in Thailand in 2009, a year after she had begun kickboxing.

As of the end of 2012 Ekaterina Vandaryeva has 65 fights, 58 wins, including 16 knockouts.

Her favorite award “Best Fighter World Cup” is the award of the prestigious version – IFMA. Ekaterina Vandaryeva was awarded by the King of Thailand on his Birthday at his palace, in the presence of members of the royal family.

=== ONE Championship ===
Vandaryeva signed with ONE Championship and made her promotional debut against Janet Todd at ONE Championship: Century on October 13, 2019. She lost the fight via second-round knockout.

She made her sophomore appearance in the organization against Jackie Buntan at ONE on TNT 4 on April 28, 2021. She lost the fight via majority decision.

Vandaryeva faced Supergirl Jaroonsak MuayThai at ONE: Heavy Hitters on January 14, 2022. She lost the bout via controversial split decision, but earned the Performance of the Night bonus.

The rematch between Vandaryeva and Anna "Supergirl" Jarronsak was scheduled on January 14, 2023, at ONE Fight Night 6. At the weigh-ins, Vandaryeva weighed in at 125.5 pounds, 0.5 pounds over the strawweight limit. Both bouts proceeded at catchweight with Vandaryeva each fined 20% of their purses, which went to their opponents Jarronsak. However, Jarronsak stepped in to face Stamp Fairtex in a strawweight kickboxing match and the bout was cancelled.

Vandaryeva faced Iman Barlow on March 25, 2023, at ONE Fight Night 8. She lost the fight via unanimous decision.

Vandaryeva faced Martyna Kierczyńska on March 9, 2024, at ONE Fight Night 20. She won the fight via unanimous decision.

== Personal life ==
Vandaryeva has two children.

== Championships and accomplishments ==
=== Kickboxing ===
- World Kickboxing Network
  - WKN World Champion (2010, 2011)

=== Muay Thai ===
- ONE Championship
  - $50,000 Performance of the Night (One time)
- IFMA World Championships
  - Gold (2009, 2010)
  - Silver (2010)
  - IFMA European Champion (2009, 2012)
- Belarus Amateur Muaythai champion (2009–2012)

== Fight record ==
Ekaterina Vandaryeva Muay Thai and kickboxing record
59 wins, 11 losses, 1 draw
Date	Result	Opponent	Event	Location	Method	Round	Time
2024-03-09	Win	(Poland) Martyna Kierczyńska	ONE Fight Night 20	Bangkok, Thailand	Decision (unanimous)	3	3:00
2023-03-25	Loss	(England) Iman Barlow	ONE Fight Night 8	Kallang, Singapore	Decision (unanimous)	3	3:00
2022-01-14	Loss	(Thailand) Anna Supergirl Jarronsak	ONE: Heavy Hitters	Kallang, Singapore	Decision (Split)	3	3:00
2021-04-28	Loss	(United States) Jackie Buntan	ONE on TNT 4	Singapore	Decision (Majority)	3	3:00
2019-10-13	Loss	(United States) Janet Todd	ONE Championship: Century	Tokyo, Japan	KO (Head Kick)	2	2:20
2019-5-1	Draw	(China) Zeng Xiaoting	MAS Fight Ling Shan Grand Prix	Sichuan, China	Draw	1	9:00
2016-9-11	Win	(China) Ren Kailin	Kunlun Fight 52	Nanjing, China	Ext.R Decision (Unanimous)	4	3:00
2016-7-10	Win	(China) Zeng Xiaoting	Kunlun Fight 47	Nanjing, China	TKO	3	3:00
2016-2-21	Win	(Spain) Laurene De Oliveira	Kunlun Fight 38	Nanjing, China	Decision (Majority)	3	3:00
2013-12-9	Win	(Thailand) Nuansian	Diamond Fight - Russia vs the World	Moscow, Russia	TKO	3	3:00
2013-3-16	Loss	(Czech Republic) Alena Hola	W5 Fight Night	Bratislava, Slovakia	Decision (Unanimous)	3	3:00
2013-3-5	Loss	(China) Wang Kehan	C3: King of Fighters	Xichang, China	TKO	1	3:00
2013-2-2	Win	(South Korea) Ji Won Lee	K-1 Korea MAX 2013	Seoul, South Korea	Ext.R Decision (Unanimous)	4	3:00
2012-12-23	Win	(Turkey) Neslihan Mollaoglu	W5 fighter 10	Moscow, Russa	Decision (Majority)	3	3:00
2012-11-10	Win	(Slovakia) Michaela Zboncakova	W5 fighter 7	Moscow, Russia	Decision (Unanimous)	3	3:00
2011-11-26	Win	(Poland) Joanna Jędrzejczyk	Big-8 WKN World Grand Prix	Minsk, Belarus	Decision (Majority)	5	3:00
Won vacant WKN World title
2011-05-28	Loss	(Turkey) Seyda Aygun Daygun	WKN Turkey	Istanbul, Turkey	TKO	1	3:00
Legend: Win Loss Draw/No contest Notes
