= International Federation of Muaythai Associations =

Sport governing body

- Sport: Muay Thai
- Category: Combat sport
- Jurisdiction: International
- Membership: 140 national associations
- Abbreviation: IFMA
- Founded: 1993
- Affiliation: Association of IOC Recognised International Sports Federations
- Affiliation date: 6 December 2016
- Headquarters: Bangkok, Thailand; Lausanne, Switzerland
- President: Sakchye Tapsuwan
- Secretary: Stephan Fox

Official website
- muaythai.sport

The International Federation of Muaythai Associations, or IFMA, called the International Federation of Muaythai Amateur until 27 July 2019, is a sport governing body of amateur and professional Muay Thai and Muay boran consisting of 140 member countries worldwide with 5 continental federations after unification of International Federation of Muaythai Amateur and World Muaythai Council. IFMA is officially recognised by the International Olympic Committee (IOC), the Global Association of International Sports Federations (GAISF), the Association of IOC Recognised International Sports Federations (ARISF), the Olympic Council of Asia (OCA), World Anti-Doping Agency (WADA) International World Games Association (IWGA), and Trim and Fitness International Sport for All Association (TAFISA). Muaythai has been included in many official sport programs such as the World Games, World Combat Games, Arafura Games, TAFISA Games, SEA Games, Asian Indoor and Martial Arts Games, Asian Beach Games, Demonstration Sport in the Asian Games.

== History ==
The International Federation of Muaythai Associations (IFMA) was officially inaugurated in 1993 as the International Federation of Muaythai Amateur, a small federation with several member countries. IFMA has grown to 128 member countries worldwide with 5 continental federations under a single, unified regulatory body. In 1998, IFMA was formally recognized by the Olympic Council of Asia. IFMA's objective is the total unification of all 128 member national federations, working mutually for the sport and the athletes.

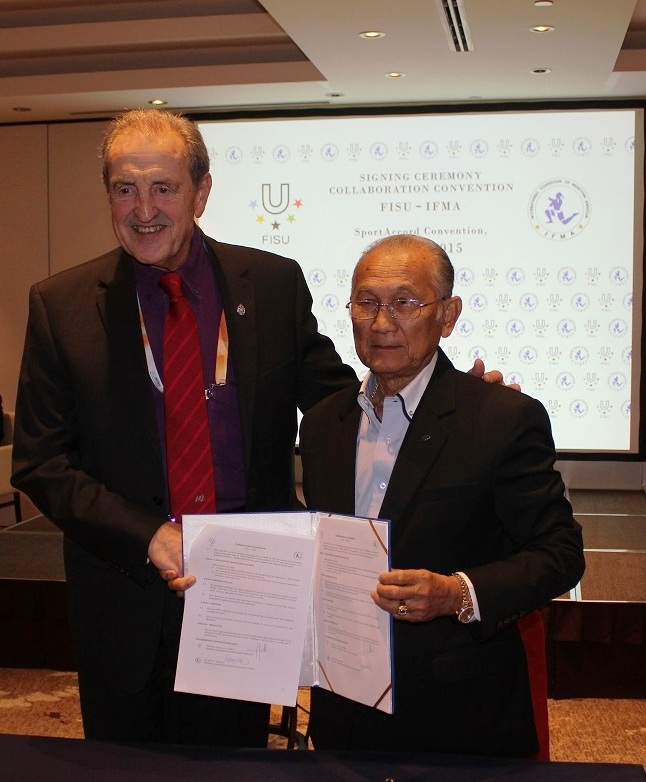
FISU President Gallien & IFMA President Sakchye Tapsuwan sign the collaboration convention

At the IFMA Royal World Cup in Bangkok the AIMS conference took place gathering all 23 presidents from its members as well as representatives of IOC, FISU, IWGA, Peace and Sport, TAFISA and many others. The 2015 IFMA Royal World Cup displayed the rapid popularity of women competing in muaythai as the stadium quickly reached capacity during female bouts that displayed courage and heart. 93 countries participated in this event.

In December 2015 AIMS received provisional recognition by the IOC. The following year in December 2016 at the annual meeting of the IOC Executive Board, Muaythai with IFMA as the governing body, was granted provisional IOC recognition for a period of three years. This allows IFMA to receive funding from the IOC and apply for development programmes.

=== Timeline ===
Some of IFMA's milestones:

- 2005 – Inclusion in the Southeast Asian Games (SEA Games) as a fully recognised medal sport.
- 2005 – Inclusion in the Asian Indoor Games (AIG).
- 2006 – Recognition from the Global Association of International Sports Federations (GAISF).
- 2008 – Inclusion in the Trim and Fitness International Sport for All Association (TAFISA) Games and as a full member of the TAFISA Sport for All Organization.
- 2008 – Inclusion in the Arafura Games.
- 2009 – Inclusion in the Asian Martial Arts Games (AMAG).
- 2010 – Inclusion in the GAISF World Combat Games.
- 2013 – Inclusion in the International World Games Association (IWGA)
- 2013 – Inclusion in the Asian Indoor and Martial Arts Games (AIMAG).
- 2014 – Inclusion in the Asian Beach Games.
- 2015 – International University Sports Federation (FISU) gives its patronage for University Muaythai Cup.
- 2015 – International University Sports Federation (FISU) has officially recognised muaythai signing the agreement between FISU and IFMA.
- 2016 – Provisional recognition from the International Olympic Committee.
- 2019 – Fully recognition from the International Olympic Committee.
- 2019 – Unification with World Muaythai Council (WMC) and rebranded to International Federation of Muaythai Associations (IFMA).

=== IOC recognition ===
On December 6, 2016, the IOC Executive Board had provisionally recognised muaythai following an executive board meeting in Lausanne, Switzerland.

== Governance ==
=== Executive committee ===
Name	Role	Country
H.E. General Pichit Kullavanijaya	Honorary life president	Thailand
H.E. General Chetta Thanajaro	Honorary life president	Thailand
Yeo Kyu-tae	Honorary life president	South Korea
Dr. Sakchye Tapsuwan	President	Thailand
Stephan Fox	Secretary general	Germany / Australia
Kajorn Prowsri	Treasurer	Thailand
H.E. Karim Massimov	Vice president	Kazakhstan
İbrahim Murat Gündüz	Vice president	Turkey
Elisa Salinas	Vice president	Mexico
Driss El Hilali	Vice president	Morocco
Sue Glassey	Vice president	New Zealand
Rafal Szlachta	Vice president	Poland
Somsak Leeswatrakul	Vice president	Thailand
Gennadiy Trukhanov	Vice president	Ukraine
Patrick Van Acker	Committee member	Belgium
Anatoliy Simonchik	Committee member	Belarus
Janice Lyn	Committee member	Canada
Michael Reid	Committee member	Canada
Petr Ottich	Committee member	Czech Republic
Nadir Allouache	Committee member	France
Detlef Turnau	Committee member	Germany
László Szabó	Committee member	Hungary
Vacant	Committee member	Italy
Sami Kiblawi	Committee member	Lebanon
Dato' Shahnaz bin Azmi	Committee member	Malaysia
Sham Seetaram	Committee member	Mauritius
Rodrigo Jorquera	Committee member	Peru
Lucas Managuelod	Committee member	Philippines
Ana Vital Melo	Committee member	Portugal
Dmitry Putilin	Committee member	Russia
Mervyn Tan	Committee member	Singapore
Gustavo Luna	Committee member	Spain
Kasra Ashami	Committee member	Sweden
Charissa Tynan	Committee member	Thailand
Erdoğan Aydın	Committee member	Turkey
Halil Durna	Committee member	Turkey
Tareq Al-Mhairi	Committee member	United Arab Emirates
Michael Corley	Committee member	United States

=== President’s Advisory Council ===
Name	Role	Country
Amir Hussaini	Advisory council member	Afghanistan
Ricky Tsang	Advisory council member	Hong Kong
Javad Nasiri	Advisory council member	Iran
Wu Wei Keong	Advisory council member	Macau
Iztok Vorkapič	Advisory council member	Slovenia

=== Commissions ===
Commission	Chairperson	Country
IFMA Technical & Rules Commission	Dmitry Putilin	Russia
IFMA Referee & Judge Commission	Somchai Sripiew	Thailand
IFMA Medical Commission	Erdoğan Aydın	Turkey
IFMA Finance Commission	Sham Seetaram	Mauritius
IFMA Sport & Active Society Commission	Panida Ottesen	Denmark
IFMA Youth Commission	Elisa Salinas	Mexico
IFMA Gender Equality Commission	Sue Glassey	New Zealand
IFMA Ethics Commission	Caroline Baxter Tresise	France
IFMA Press & PR Commission	Toli Makris	Germany
IFMA Business Commission	Rolf Hess	Switzerland
IFMA Legal Commission	Mervyn Tan	Singapore
IFMA Athletes Commission	Janice Lyn	Canada
IFMA Entourage Commission	Vacant	
IFMA Education Commission	Dato' Shahnaz bin Azmi	Malaysia
IFMA Culture & Heritage Commission	Chao Wathayotha	Thailand
IFMA Professional Commission	Kasra Ashami	Sweden

=== Area associations ===
International Federation of Muaythai Associations has a total of 122 member federations divided into 5 area associations.

EMF – European Muaythai Federation in Europe
FAMA – Federation of Asian Muaythai Associations in Asia
Africa
OMF – Oceania Muaythai Federation in Oceania
PAMU – Pan-American Muaythai Union in the Americas

Code	Country	Federation	Website	Note
European Muaythai Federation
ALB	Albania			Provisional Member
AND	Andorra			Provisional Member
ARM	Armenia	Armenian Muaythai Federation	armeniamuaythai.com	
AUT	Austria	Austrian Kickboxing and Thai Boxing Association	ifmamuaythai.at	
AZE	Azerbaijan	Azerbaijan Muaythai and Thaiboxing Federation		
BLR	Belarus	Belarusian Muaythai Federation	kickthai.by	
BEL	Belgium	Belgian Muaythai Organisation	bkbmo.be	
BIH	Bosnia and Herzegovina	Muay Thai Union BiH		
BUL	Bulgaria	Bulgarian National Muay Thai Federation	muaythai.bg	
CRO	Croatia	Croatian Muaythai Federation	hoo.hr	
CYR	Cyprus	Cyprus Muaythai Federation	cyprusmuaythai.org	
CZE	Czech Republic	Czech Muay Thai Association	czechmuaythai.cz	
DEN	Denmark	Danish Muay Thai Federation	dkmf.dk	
EST	Estonia	Eesti Muay Thai Föderatsioon	thaiboxing.ee	
FIN	Finland	Muaythai Association of Finland	muaythai.fi	
FRA	France	Fédération française de kick boxing, muay thaï et disciplines associées	ffkmda.fr	
GEO	Georgia	Thaiboxing Georgian Federation	geonoc.org.ge	
GER	Germany	Muaythai Bund Deutschland e.V.	mtbd.de	
GRE	Greece	Panhellenic Muaythai Federation	pmf.gr	
HUN	Hungary	Hungarian Muaythai Federation	muaythai.hu	
ISL	Iceland			Provisional Member
IRL	Ireland	Irish Muaythai Council	muaythaiireland.com	
ISR	Israel	Muaythai Ring and Combat Sport Association	muaythai.co.il	
ITA	Italy	Federkombat	federkombat.it	
KOS	Kosovo	Kosovo Federation of Muaythai	noc-kosovo.org	
LAT	Latvia	Latvian Muaythai Federation	muaythai.lv	
LIE	Liechtenstein			Provisional Member
LTU	Lithuania	Lithuanian Muaythai Federation	muaythai.lt	
LUX	Luxembourg	Federation Luxembourgeoise des Arts Martiaux - FLAM		Provisional Member
MKD	North Macedonia	Muay Thai and Kickboxing Federation of Macedonia		
MLT	Malta	Malta Muay Thai		
MDA	Moldova	Federation of Muaythai of Republic of Moldova	thaiboxclub.md	
MON	Monaco	Fédération Monégasque de Muaythai et Disciplines Associées	federation-muaythai.mc	
MNE	Montenegro	Montenegrin Mauy Thai Federation		
NED	Netherlands	Muaythai Organisation Netherlands	mon-ifma.org	
NOR	Norway	Norwegian Muaythai Association	nmta.no	
POL	Poland	Polish Muaythai Federation	pzmuaythai.pl	
POR	Portugal	Portuguese Muaythai Federation	fpkmt.pt	
ROM	Romania	Romanian Federation of Contact Martial Arts - FRAMC		Provisional Member
RUS	Russia	Russian Muaythai Federation	rmtf.ru	
SMR	San Marino			Provisional Member
SRB	Serbia			Provisional Member
SVK	Slovakia	Slovak Muaythai Association	smta.sk	
SLO	Slovenia	Slovenian Muay thai Federation	olympic.si	
ESP	Spain	Federacion Española de Kickboxing y Muaythai	spainmuaythai.com	
SWE	Sweden	Svenska Muaythai Förbundet	muaythai.se	
SUI	Switzerland	Swiss Muaythai League		Provisional Member
TUR	Turkey	Turkish Muaythai Federation	muaythai.gov.tr	
UKR	Ukraine	Ukraine National Muaythai Federation	muaythai.org.na	
GBR	United Kingdom	United Kingdom Muaythai Federation	ukmtf.com	
Federation of Asian Muaythai Associations
AFG	Afghanistan	Afghanistan National Federation of Muaythai	muaythai.org.af	
BRN	Bahrain	Bahraini Federation of Muaythai		Provisional Member
BAN	Bangladesh			Provisional Member
CHN	China	China Muaythai Association	olympic.cn	
TPE	Chinese Taipei	Chinese Taipei Muaythai Association	sanda.org.tw	
HKG	Hong Kong	Hong Kong Muay Thai Association	hkmuaythai.org	
IND	India	United Muaythai Association of India	www.olympic.org/india	
INA	Indonesia	Indonesian Muaythai Federation	nocindonesia.or.id	Provisional Member
IRI	Iran	I.R. IRAN National Muaythai Association	olympic.ir	
IRQ	Iraq	Iraqi Muaythai Federation	nociraq.iq	
JPN	Japan	All Japan Muaythai Federation	ifma-j.org	
JOR	Jordan	Jordan Muay Thai Association	joc.jo	
KAZ	Kazakhstan	Muaythai Federation of the Republic of Kazakhstan	olympic.kz	
KOR	South Korea	Korea Muaythai Association	sports.or.kr/eng	
KUW	Kuwait	Kuwait Muaythai Committee	kuwaitolympic.com	
KGZ	Kyrgyzstan	Kyrgyz Muaythai Federation	kyrgyzmuaythai.org	
LAO	Laos	Laos Muaythai		Provisional Member
LBN	Lebanon	Lebanese Muaythai Federation	lebolymp.org	
MAC	Macau	Macau Muaythai Association	macauolympic.org	
MAS	Malaysia	Malaysia Muaythai Association	muaythaimalaysia.org	
MGL	Mongolia	Muaythai Federation of Mongolia	fight.mn	
MYA	Myanmar			Provisional Member
NEP	Nepal	Nepal Muay Thai Association		
OMA	Oman			Provisional Member
PAK	Pakistan	Pakistan Federation Amateur Muaythai	pfampk.com	
PLE	Palestine	Palestine Federation of Muaythai	poc.ps	
PHI	Philippines	Muaythai Association of the Philippines	olympic.ph	
QAT	Qatar			Provisional Member
KSA	Saudi Arabia	Saudi Muaythai and Kickboxing Federation		
SGP	Singapore	Muaythai Association Singapore (MAS)	amas.org.sg	
SRI	Sri Lanka	Muayhai Association of Sri Lanka	mtaslb.com	
SYR	Syria			Provisional Member
TJK	Tajikistan	Muaythai Federation of Tajikistan	olympic.tj	
THA	Thailand	Amateur Muaythai Association of Thailand (AMTAT)	olympicthai.or.th	
TLS	Timor-Leste			Provisional Member
TKM	Turkmenistan	Turkmenistan Muaythai Federation		
UAE	United Arab Emirates	UAE Muaythai Federation	mkfed.ae	
UZB	Uzbekistan	Uzbekistan Amateur and Professional Muaythai Association	muaythai-ifma.uz	
VIE	Vietnam	Vietnam Muay Federation	muayviet.com	
YEM	Yemen	Yemen Federation of Muaythai		
Africa
ALG	Algeria	Algeria Full Contact Kickboxing, Muaythai and Related Disciplines Federation		
ANG	Angola			Provisional Member
CMR	Cameroon	Federation camerounaise de muaythai et disciplines affinitaires		
EGY	Egypt	Egyptian Muaythai Federation		
ETH	Ethiopia			Provisional Member
GAM	Gambia			Provisional Member
GHA	Ghana	Ghana Muaythai Federation		
GUI	Guinea	Guinea Federation of Muaythai and associated Disciplines		
CIV	Ivory Coast	Federation Ivoirienne de Muaythai et Disciplines Assimilees	fimt-muaythai.com	
KEN	Kenya			Provisional Member
LBA	Libya	Libyan Union for Kickboxing and Similar Sports	olympic.ly	
MDA	Madagascar			Provisional Member
MAU	Mauritania			Provisional Member
MRI	Mauritius	Mauritius Muaythai Federation	nocmauritius.org	
MAR	Morocco	Federation Royale Marocaine de Muay Tai	cnomaroc.org	
MOZ	Mozambique			Provisional Member
NAM	Namibia			Provisional Member
NGR	Nigeria	Nigeria Muaythai Federation		
SEN	Senegal			Provisional Member
SLE	Sierra Leone	Sierra Leone Muaythai Association		
RSA	South Africa	South African Amateur Muaythai Federation	muaythai.org.za	
TUN	Tunisia			
UGA	Uganda			Provisional Member
Oceania Muaythai Federation
AUS	Australia	Muaythai Australia	muaythaiaustralia.com.au	
COK	Cook Islands			Provisional Member
FIJ	Fiji			Provisional Member
PYF	French Polynesia	Fédération Polynésienne Boxe Thaïlandaise et Disciplines Associées		
NZL	New Zealand	New Zealand Muaythai Federation		
PNG	Papua New Guinea			Provisional Member
SAM	Samoa			Provisional Member
TGA	Tonga			Provisional Member
Pan American Muaythai Union
ARG	Argentina	Federación Argentina de Muaythai	muaythai.com.ar	
ARU	Aruba	Muay Thai Federation Aruba		
BAR	Barbados			Provisional Member
BOL	Bolivia	Federacion Boliviana de Muaythai		Membership in process
BRA	Brazil	Confederacao Brasileira de Muaythai Tradicional	cbmttbrasil.com	
CAN	Canada	Muaythai Canada	muaythaicanada.org	
CHI	Chile			Provisional Member
COL	Colombia	Federation Colombiana De Muaythai		
CRC	Costa Rica	Federacion Costarricense de Muaythai		
DOM	Dominican Republic	Federacion Dominicana de Muaythai		
ECU	Ecuador	Federación Ecuatoriana de Muaythai		
SLV	El Salvador			Provisional Member
GUA	Guatemala			Provisional Member
HON	Honduras	Federacion Hondurena De Muaythai	muaythaihn.blogspot.com	
JAM	Jamaica			Provisional Member
MEX	Mexico	Mexican Muaythai Federation	femem.mx	
PAN	Panama			Provisional Member
PAR	Paraguay	Federacion Paraguaya de Muaythai		
PER	Peru	Peruvian Muaythai Federation	muaythaiperu.com	
PUE	Puerto Rico			Provisional Member
SUR	Suriname	Surinamese Thaiboxing Association (Suthaibo)		
TTO	Trinidad and Tobago	Trinbago Muaythai		
USA	United States	United States Muaythai Federation		
URU	Uruguay	Federacion Uruguaya de Muaythai Tradicional	fumtt.com.uy	
VEN	Venezuela			Provisional Member

== Events ==
=== International ===
Denotes inaugural event

Year	World Games	World Combat Games	World University Championships	World Martial Arts Masterships	World Championships / Cup	World Youth Championships
1993					(Thailand) Bangkok	
1994						
1995						
1996						
1997						
1998					(Thailand) Bangkok	
1999					(Thailand) Bangkok	
2000					(Thailand) Bangkok	
2001					(Thailand) Bangkok	
2002					(Thailand) Bangkok	
2003					(Kazakhstan) Almaty	
2004						
2005					(Thailand) Bangkok	(Thailand) Bangkok
2006					(Thailand) Bangkok	(Thailand) Bangkok
2007					(Thailand) Bangkok	(Thailand) Bangkok
2008					(South Korea) Busan	(South Korea) Busan
2009					(Thailand) Bangkok	(Thailand) Bangkok
2010		(China) Beijing			(Thailand) Bangkok	(Thailand) Bangkok
2011					(Uzbekistan) Tashkent	(Uzbekistan) Tashkent
2012					(Russia) Saint Petersburg	(Russia) Saint Petersburg
2013		(Russia) Saint Petersburg				(Turkey) Istanbul
2014					(Malaysia) Langkawi	(Malaysia) Langkawi
2015					(Thailand) Bangkok	(Thailand) Bangkok
2016				(South Korea) Cheongju	(Sweden) Jönköping	(Thailand) Bangkok
2017	(Poland) Wrocław				(Belarus) Minsk	(Thailand) Bangkok
2018			(Thailand) Bangkok		(Mexico) Cancún	(Thailand) Bangkok
2019				(South Korea) Chungju	(Thailand) Bangkok	(Turkey) Antalya
2020			(Kazakhstan) Nur-Sultan		(United Arab Emirates) Abu Dhabi	(Malaysia) TBA
2021	(United States) Birmingham	(Kazakhstan) Nur-Sultan			(Thailand) Bangkok	
2022			(Russia) Ekaterinburg			

=== Continental ===
Denotes inaugural event

Year	European Championships	Asian Championships	African Championships	Oceanian Championships	Pan American Championships
2008	(Poland) Zgorzelec				
2010	(Italy) Velletri				
2011	(Turkey) Antalya				
2013	(Portugal) Lisbon				

== Professional rankings ==
As of 10 April 2020

=== Men's divisions ===
Rank	Mini flyweight	Flyweight	Bantamweight	Super bantamweight
C	N/A	N/A	N/A	N/A
1	(Thailand) Netipong Phrommakhot	(Russia) Charak Murtuzaliev	(Thailand) Detrak Kulsena	(Thailand) Buengon Leknakhonsiri
2	(Russia) Ovsep Aslanyan	(Thailand) Chanalert Meenayothin	(Thailand) Kumandoi Petcharoenvit	(Thailand) Kompatak Sinbimuaythai
3	(Thailand) Petchdech Wor.Sangbrapai	(Thailand) Satanmuanglek PetchyindeeAcademy	(Thailand) Ronachai Tor.Ramintra	(Thailand) Ponsanae Sor.Pumiphat
4	(Thailand) Yodkla Isantractor	(Thailand) PetchAnuwat Nor.Anuwatgym	(Thailand) Saotho Sitchefboontham	(Thailand) Petchhuahin Bor.Petchkaikaew
5	(Thailand) Watcharapon Meenayothin	(Thailand) Peerapat Muayded789	(Thailand) Petchmuangsiri Odtukdaeng	(Thailand) Kongthoranee Sor.Sommai
6	(Cambodia) Koemrieng Him	(Thailand) Sakaengam Jitmuangnon	(Thailand) Chartpet Sor.Poonsawat	(Thailand) Chailar Por.Lakboon
7	(Laos) Soulixay Singsavath	(Thailand) Malaynguen Somwang Gai Yang	(Philippines) Ariel Lee Lampacan	(Thailand) Tepthaksin Sor.Sonsing
8	(Turkey) Zubeyr Barin	(China) Luo Chenghao	(Peru) Nicolas Young	(Peru) Nicolas Young
9	(Afghanistan) Mashal Islamzai	(Belarus) Mikita Mironchyk	(Russia) Kholmurod Rakhimov	(Russia) Kholmurod Rakhimov
10	(Japan) Nadaka Eiwasportsgym	(Kazakhstan) Bakytzhan Arifkhanov	(Kazakhstan) Yelaman Sayassatov	(Kazakhstan) Yelaman Sayassatov
Rank	Featherweight	Super featherweight	Lightweight	Super lightweight
C	N/A	N/A	(Cyprus) Savvas Michael	N/A
1	(Kazakhstan) Almaz Sarsembekov	(Thailand) Superlek Kiatmuu9	(Russia) Aik Begian	(Ukraine) Igor Liubchenko
2	(Thailand) Kiewpayak Jitmuangnon	(Thailand) Yodtongtai Sor.Sommai	(Thailand) Kaona SorJor.Tongprachin	(Russia) Abdulmalik Mugidinov
3	(Thailand) Phetpangan Mor.Ratanabandit	(Thailand) Yodkritsada Yutthichonburi	(Thailand) Rodtang Jitmuangnon	(Thailand) Nuenglanlek Jitmuangnon
4	(Thailand) Messi Pangkongprab	(Thailand) Mongkolkaew Sor.Sommai	(Thailand) Tiradet Chor.Hapayak	(Thailand) Chamuaktong Fightermuaythai
5	(Thailand) Samingdet Nor.Anuwatgym	(Thailand) Lamnamoonlek Or.Atchariya	(Thailand) Sittisak Sengchimyou Yim	(Thailand) Shadow Suanahanpiekmai
6	(Thailand) Chalam Parunchai	(Thailand) Thanupetch Wor.Sangprapai	(Thailand) Extra Rongsamak OBJ Udon	(Thailand) Sangmanee Sathian
7	(Russia) Alexsandr Abramov	(Russia) Alexsandr Abramov	(Thailand) Petchmanee Por.Lakboon	(Malaysia) Mohd Fazzatki bin Mohd Zaki
8	(Sweden) Nicholas Bryant	(Thailand) Tananchai Somwang Gai Yang	(Turkey) Sercan Koç	(Philippines) Ryan Jakiri
9	(Ukraine) Vladyslav Mykytas	(France) Arthur Meyer	(Belarus) Daniil Yermolenka	(Thailand) Kittipop Mueangprom
10	(Russia) Tagir Khalilov	(United Kingdom) Jonathan Haggerty	(Vietnam) Nguyễn Trần Duy Nhất	(Afghanistan) Yousef Jahangir
Rank	Welterweight	Super welterweight	Middleweight	Super middleweight
C	(France) Bobo Sacko	(Ukraine) Oleksandr Moisa	(France) Jimmy Vienot	(France) Yohan Lidon
1	(Thailand) Thanet Nitutorn	(Thailand) Khunsuk Sitchefboontham	(Russia) Ilya Balanov	(France) Jimmy Vienot
2	(Thailand) Pongsiri P.K.Saenchaigym	(Thailand) Talaytong Sor.Thanapetch	(Thailand) Capitan PetchyindeeAcademy	(Slovakia) Vladimir Moravcik
3	(Thailand) Yodlekpet Or.Pitisak	(Thailand) Saenpon PetchpacharaAcademy	(Thailand) Yodwicha Banchamek	(Australia) Toby Smith
4	(France) Rafi Singpatong	(Thailand) Bangpleenoi Sor.Jitpadana	(Thailand) Superbon Banchamek	(France) Samy Sana
5	(United Kingdom) Liam Harrison	(France) Nacheer KiatcamtonGym	(Belgium) Youssef Boughanem	(Uzbekistan) Mansurbek Tolipov
6	(Belarus) Dmitry Varats	(Thailand)	(Ukraine) Oleh Huta	(Thailand) Khompikad Sor Tawnrung
7	(Hungary) Speth Norbert Attila	(Thailand) Wanchalerm Nuantongsnooker	(Belarus) Andrei Kulebin	(Ukraine) Volodymyr Baryshev
8	(United Kingdom) Charlie Peters	(Russia) Artem Pashporin	(Thailand) Sorgraw PetchyindeeAcademy	(Spain) Nayanesh Parikh Bumba
9	(Turkey) Erdem Dincer	(United Kingdom) Liam Nolan	(Peru) Gabriel Mazzetti	(Lebanon) Youssef Abboud
10	(Australia) Chadd Collins	(United Kingdom) George Mann	(United Arab Emirates) Amine El Moatassime	(Sweden) Anton Sjoqvist
Rank	Light heavyweight	Cruiserweight	Heavyweight	Super heavyweight
C	N/A	N/A	N/A	N/A
1		(Russia) Gadzhi Medzhidov	(Ukraine) Oleh Primachov	(Turkey) Bugra Tugay Erdogan
2	(Belarus) Mikita Shostak	(Belarus) Yavheni Vavchok	(Belarus) Dzianis Hanchanarok	(Belgium) Yasin Petchsaman MT
3	(Ukraine) Vasyl Sorokin	(Ukraine) Anatolii Sukhanov	(Czech Republic) Jakub Klauda	(France) Amine Kebir
4	(Canada) Simon Marcus	(Poland) Lukasz Radosv	(Sri Lanka) Weerasinghe Madushanka	(Ukraine) Viktor Torkotluk
5	(Thailand) Tengnueng Sitjaesairoong	(United States) Nathaniel Gaston	(Azerbaijan) Zabit Samedov	(United States) Steve Banks
6	(Australia) Jake Lund	(Spain) Lorenzo Jiminez Martinez	(Russia) Nadir Iskhanov	(Algeria) Chelli Kahin
7	(Russia) Surik Magakian	(Kazakhstan) Alexandr Tsarikov	(Pakistan) Syed Asrar Hussain Sha	(Czech Republic) Michal Reissinger
8	(Netherlands) Nicolai Woltmeijer Bartholin	(Serbia) Milos Cvjeticanin	(France) Brice Guiden	(Poland) Matuesz Duczmal
9	(United Arab Emirates) Ilyas Hbibali	(Algeria) Benkerrov Messaoud	(Dominica) Miguel Fuerte	(Brazil) Vinicius Silva Novaes De Souza
10	(Mexico) Miguel Angel Padilla	(Turkey) Cengaver Taylan Kemik	(Italy) Raffaele Vitale	(Iran) Soleymani Safakhaneh Seyed Kaveh

=== Women's divisions ===
Rank	Pinweight	Mini flyweight	Flyweight
C	N/A	N/A	(Thailand) Ticha Wor Por Sukothai RR Kila Korat
1	(Belarus) Alena Liashkevich	(Finland) Tessa Kakkonen	(Vietnam) Bùi Yến Ly
2	(Thailand) Samtiya Bor Buayboonpuet	(Australia) Sze Sze Rowlinson	(Russia) Ekaterina Gurina
3	(Thailand) Pluengwaree Sor Boonchay	(Thailand) FahChiangRai Sor Sakunthong	(Turkey) Funda Alkayis
4	(Finland) Satu Mykkanen	(Thailand) Gulabdam Sit Sor Nor	(Thailand) Ploykiaw Sakchad
5	(Thailand) Tawanchai Dabhanyim	(Thailand) Gaewda Wor Muangpetch	(Thailand) Sommanee Wor Santai
6	(Thailand) Pawida Sor Pongsakon	(Turkey) Gulistan Turan	(Thailand) Rungnapa Por Muangpetch
7	(Ukraine) Yuliia Diachenko	(Thailand) Suphisara Konlak	(Thailand) Petchiruang Wor Woragon
8	(Russia) Vera Negodina	(France) Myriame Djedidi	(Slovakia) Monika Chochlikova
9	(Vietnam) Huỳnh Hà Hữu Hiếu	(Singapore) Cheryl Gwa	(United Kingdom) Lisa Brierly
10	(Ukraine) Yuliia Diachenko	(Ukraine) Hanna Avakova	(Canada) Yumiko Kawano
Rank	Bantamweight	Featherweight	Lightweight
C	(Sweden) Sofia Olofsson	(Thailand) Pecthdabi Mor Krungtep Thonburi	N/A
1	(Russia) Almira Tinchurina	(Russia) Maria Klimova	(Israel) Nili Block
2	(Thailand) Jitti Sor Sor Chiang Mai	(Australia) Yolanda Schmidt	(Sweden) Isa Tidblad
3	(Thailand) Kwanjai Sor Tawanrung	(Canada) Candice Mitchell	(Russia) Ekaterina Vinnikova
4	(Thailand) Wondergirl Fairtex	(Thailand) Sayfa Sor Suparat	(Belarus) Darya Bialkova
5	(United States) Sylvie Petchrungruang	(Thailand) Nongurn Sor Konggrapan	(Thailand) Janjeira Wankrue
6	(United States) Liya Sinbi Muaythai Gym	(Thailand) Jomyutting Sor Engineer Concrete	(Mexico) Mariana Ramirez Sanchez
7	(Philippines) Jenelyn Olsim	(France) Anaelle Angerville	(Belarus) Mariya Valent
8	(United States) Coral Carnicella	(Canada) Taylor McClatchie	(Austria) Nina Scheucher
9	(Thailand) Yadrung “Chomanee” Tehiran	(Czech Republic) Karolina Klusova	(Ukraine) Oleksandra Pecheniuk
10	(Czech Republic) Viktorie Bulinova	(Sweden) Patricia Axling	(Finland) Gia Winberg
Rank	Lightweight	Welterweight	Middleweight
C	(Australia) Claire Baxter	N/A	N/A
1	(Australia) Zoe Putorak	(Turkey) Bediha Taçyıldız	(Finland) Anna Rantanen
2	(United States) Angela Whitley	(Sweden) Emma Stonegård Abrahamsson	(Sweden) Angela Mamic
3	(Sweden) Sara Matsson	(Russia) Anastasiia Nepianidi	(New Zealand) Genah Fabian
4	(Russia) Veronika Profeva	(Kazakhstan) Ilmira Kunakhunova	(Canada) Charmaine Tweet
5	(Sweden) Isa Tidblad	(Belarus) Alexsandra Sitnikova	(Iran) Mahsa Salehpour
6	(Russia) Svetlana Vinnikova	(Kyrgyzstan) Alena Artemova	(Croatia) Helena Jurišić
7	(Sweden) Erica Björnestrand	(Finland) Riikka Järvenpää	(Russia) Anna Tarasava
8	(Colombia) Sabina Mazo	(Mexico) Maria Eugenia Gonzalez Sanquis	(Thailand) Michelle Lanna MT
9	(Turkey) Kübra Akbulut	(Australia) Georgia Smith	(Thailand) Gradai Noi Wor Por Sukhothai
10	(Ukraine) Anita Khodieieva	(Russia) Tatiana Sharkova	(New Zealand) Tersi Rookwood

== Criticism ==
The Ukrainian and Finnish national teams boycotted the 2022 IFMA Youth World Championships held in Malaysia due to IFMA reversing their decision of not allowing the Russian and Belarusian national teams to participate in the competition.

At the 2023 Southeast Asian Games in Phnom Penh, the boxing style commonly practiced in Cambodia, Laos, and Thailand was named Kun Khmer. The decision led to a severe backlash in Thailand. The sport has already been renamed Muay Lao once when the event was hosted in Vientiane in 2009, sparking no reactions from Thailand at that time. In 2023, the IFMA threatened six member-countries from Southeast Asia - Malaysia, Vietnam, the Philippines, Indonesia, Thailand, and Singapore - with a two-year ban on any IFMA competitions and activities should they join the competition. Eventually only Thai athletes boycotted the competition.

== See also ==
- IFMA World Muaythai Championships
- African Muaythai Championships
- Asian Muaythai Championships
- European Muaythai Championships
- Pan American Muaythai Championships
