= Dangkongfah Kiatpetnoi Gym =

Thai professional Muay Thai fighter

- Born: Piamsuk Permkhunthod (Thai: เปี่ยมสุข เพิ่มขุนทด); November 1, 2001 (age 25); Nakhon Ratchasima, Thailand
- Other names: Dangkongfah KhunPon Martial Arts; Dangkongfah Banchamek; Dangkongfah Jaosurenoi; Dangkongfah Sittongsak; Dangkongfah Smartheart Power Pack Girl
- Nationality: Thai
- Height: 158 cm (5 ft 2 in)
- Division: Bantamweight
- Style: Muay Thai
- Fighting out of: Nakhon Ratchasima, Thailand
- Team: KhunPon Martial Arts; Khao Yai Muay Thai Academy; Kiatpetnoi Gym; Kangaroo Muay Thai Gym; Banchamek Gym; Lukgongfah Gym
- Years active: –present

Kickboxing record
- Total: 84
- Wins: 68
- Losses: 14
- Draws: 2

Piamsuk Permkhunthod (Thai: เปี่ยมสุข เพิ่มขุนทด), professionally known as Dangkongfah (Thai: ดังก้องฟ้า), is a Thai female professional Muay Thai fighter. She became the 115-pound (52.16 kg) Thailand Champion in 2020 and the WBC Muay Thai World Champion in 2021.

== Career ==
On September 27, 2020, Dangkongfah won the Thai national championship title in the super flyweight division (115 lbs). The bout was held at Or.Tor.Gor.3 Stadium and promoted by Chang Muaythai Kiatpetch. Her opponent was Brazilian fighter Allycia Hellen Rodrigues, who later became the ONE Championship atomweight world champion. Dangkongfah won the five-round fight by decision.

On November 6, 2021, Dangkongfah won the WBC Muay Thai super flyweight (115 lbs) world title. The fight was held at the Fairtex Stadium in Pattaya, Thailand. Her opponent was French fighter Souris Manfredi. Dangkongfah won the five-round bout by decision, capturing the world championship belt.

In 2022, Dangkongfah achieved first place in the 52 kg weight category under Low Kick rules at the Thailand Kickboxing Championship.

In 2022, Dangkongfah won the gold medal in the 52 kg category under Low Kick rules at the WAKO Asian Kickboxing Championships. In the final, she defeated Vietnamese fighter Hai Linh Bui.

In 2023, Dangkongfah was once again selected for the Thai national kickboxing team and represented her country at the Southeast Asian Games (SEA Games), held in Cambodia. She completed her training alongside the other team members at the Banchamek Gym. The national team was led by legendary fighter Buakaw Banchamek. Dangkongfah competed in the K-1 discipline, in the 52 kg weight category, and went on to win a bronze medal.

In 2024, Dangkongfah won the championship title in the 53 kg weight class at the Sinbi Boxing Stadium, and later that year she also became champion in two different weight divisions at the Patong Stadium, first in the 132 lbs and then in the 121 lbs category.

In 2025, five-time Muay Thai champion Dangkongfah joined the Khao Yai Muay Thai Academy as a coach.

On September 17, 2026, Dangkongfah, a KhunPon Martial Arts fighter, defeated Iranian Katayoun of Phuket Fight Club by TKO at Bangla Boxing Stadium, thereby winning the Bangla Boxing Stadium championship title.

On October 30, 2026, Dangkongfah returned to the Rajadamnern Stadium after more than a year and a half, securing a victory at the Rajadamnern Knockout event in the 112-pound division with a unanimous decision win over Malaysia's Kwan Yin Ling in three two-minute rounds.

== Titles and accomplishments ==
=== Kickboxing ===
- World Association of Kickboxing Organizations (WAKO)
  - 2021 SEA Games Vietnam Low Kick (-52 kg) Bronze
  - 2022 Thailand Kickboxing Championship Low Kick (-52 kg) 1st place
  - 2022 Asian Kickboxing Championships Low Kick (-52 kg) Gold
  - 2023 SEA Games K1 (-52 kg) Bronze

=== Muay Thai ===
- Professional Boxing Association of Thailand (PAT)
  - 2020 Thailand Super flyweight (115 lbs) Champion
- WBC Muay Thai
  - 2021 WBC Muay Thai World Super flyweight (115 lbs) Champion
- Patong Fight Night
  - 2024 Patong Fight Night Champion (132 lbs)
  - 2024 Patong Fight Night Champion (121 lbs)
- Sinbi Boxing Stadium Fights
  - 2024 Sinbi Boxing Stadium Champion (53 kg)
- Bangla Boxing Stadium
  - 2026 Bangla Boxing Stadium Champion
- International Federation of Muaythai Associations (IFMA)
  - 2017 I.F.M.A. Youth (14–15) World Championships (63.5 kg) Bronze

== Muay Thai and Kickboxing record ==
Professional Muay Thai Record
68 Wins, 14 Losses, 2 Draws
Date	Result	Opponent	Event	Location	Method	Round	Time
2026-11-28		TBA	IFL Muay Thai League, MAX Muay Thai Stadium, Semi-finals	Pattaya, Thailand			
2026-10-30	Win	(Malaysia) Kwan Yin Ling	Rajadamnern Knockout	Bangkok, Thailand	Decision (Unanimous)	3	2:00
2026-10-10	Win	(Thailand) Christina Pumphanmuang	IFL Muay Thai League, MAX Muay Thai Stadium, Quarter-finals	Pattaya, Thailand	Decision	3	2:00
2026-09-17	Win	(Iran) Katayoun Phuket Fight Club	Bangla Boxing Stadium	Phuket, Thailand	TKO	3	
Wins the Bangla Boxing Stadium title.
2026-08-29	Win	(Algeria) Lidia Lion MMA Club	Sinbi Boxing Stadium Fights	Phuket, Thailand	Decision	3	2:50
2026-08-09	Win	(France) Cindy Silvestre	MAIN Championship	Colombo, Sri Lanka	Decision	3	3:00
2026-07-06	Win	(Brazil) Samira Yumi Yamamoto	Bangla Boxing Stadium	Phuket, Thailand	Decision		
2026-05-12	Win	(Thailand) Nong B S.Dejdamrong	Dejdamrong Super Fight	Patong, Thailand	Decision (Unanimous)		
2026-04-26	Win	(Iran) Fatima Nattakorn Muay Thai	Bangla Boxing Stadium	Phuket, Thailand			
2025-08-23	Win	(Thailand) Phonsan Lukchang Thong	Muay Siam Phak Isan	Pak Chong, Thailand	Decision	5	2:00
2025-07-05	Loss	(United States) Kristine Lee Carlos YakYaiMuayThai	Patong Boxing Stadium Sainamyen Road	Patong, Thailand	Decision	4	2:00
For the Patong Boxing Stadium Muay Thai Women International Championship.
2025-06-21	Loss	(Spain) Sofia Phuket Fight Club	Samui Super Fight, Phetchbuncha Stadium	Ko Samui, Thailand	Decision (Unanimous)	5	2:00
2025-04-28	Loss	(Italy) Lena Nocker	Phetchbuncha 2025	Chaweng, Thailand	Decision (Unanimous)	3	2:00
2025-03-29	Loss	(Thailand) Kamlaipetch Petchyindee	Rajadamnern World Series	Bangkok, Thailand	Decision (Unanimous)	3	2:00
2025-02-02	Loss	(Japan) ☆SAHO☆	NJKF Challenger 7	Tokyo, Japan	Decision (Unanimous)	3	3:00
2025-01-11	Loss	(Russia) Zarina Islamova	Rajadamnern World Series	Bangkok, Thailand	Decision (Unanimous)	3	2:00
2024-12-19	Win	(United States) Ashley Blanco	Patong Fight Night	Patong, Thailand	Decision (Unanimous)	5	2:00
Wins the Patong Stadium 121 lbs title.
2024-11-28	Win	(Poland) Karolina Lisowska	Patong Fight Night	Patong, Thailand	Decision (Unanimous)	5	2:00
Wins the Patong Stadium 132 lbs title.
2024-11-02	Loss	(Cambodia) Touch Chanvotey	Xtreme Cambodia Kun Khmer	Phnom Penh, Cambodia	Decision (Unanimous)	3	3:00
2024-10-19	Win	(Thailand) Nong Ann Suan Namtankern	Sinbi Boxing Stadium Fights	Phuket, Thailand	KO	2	2:00
2024-08-03	Win	(Russia) Christina Kangaroo Muay Thai	Sinbi Boxing Stadium Fights	Phuket, Thailand	Decision (Unanimous)	5	2:00
Wins the Sinbi Boxing Stadium 53 kg title.
2024-06-29	Win	(Brazil) Gabi Phuket Fight Club	Sinbi Boxing Stadium Fights	Phuket, Thailand	Decision	5	2:00
2024-03-30	Win	(United States) Kennedy Maze	Rajadamnern World Series	Bangkok, Thailand	Decision	3	2:00
2024-01-22	Win	(Cambodia) Sei Vichchaka	Wurkz Kun Khmer	Tboung Khmum province, Cambodia	Decision (Unanimous)	3	3:00
2023-12-09	Win	(Russia) Kristina Purgina	Rajadamnern World Series	Bangkok, Thailand	Decision (Unanimous)	3	2:00
2023-09-25	Win	(Spain) Dazy 7 Muay Thai	Rajadamnern World Series	Bangkok, Thailand	Decision (Unanimous)	3	2:00
2023-08-13	Win	(Thailand) Nongparnfah FamilyMuayThai	Rajadamnern World Series	Bangkok, Thailand	Decision (Unanimous)	3	2:00
2022-12-03	Loss	(Spain) Lara Fernandez	ONE 164	Pasay, Philippines	Decision (Split)	3	3:00
2022-10-01	Loss	(France) Anissa Meksen	ONE on Prime Video 2	Kallang, Singapore	Decision (Unanimous)	3	3:00
2022-06-19	Win	(Iran) Sanaz Fayaz	Muay Thai Super Champ	Bangkok, Thailand	Decision	3	3:00
2022-02-26	Loss	(Myanmar) Vero Nika	Muay Hardcore	Thailand	Decision (Unanimous)	3	3:00
2022-01-08	Win	(Myanmar) Vero Nika	Muay Hardcore	Thailand	Decision (Split)	3	3:00
2021-12-18	Win	(Uruguay) Francesca Del Baglivi	Muay Hardcore	Bangkok, Thailand	Decision (Unanimous)	3	3:00
2021-11-27	Win	(Greece) Fani Peloumpi	Muay Hardcore	Bangkok, Thailand	Decision (Unanimous)	3	3:00
2021-11-06	Win	(France) Souris Manfredi	Fairtex Stadium	Pattaya, Thailand	Decision	5	2:00
Wins the WBC Muay Thai Super-Flyweight World title (115 lbs).
2021-10-09	Loss	(Brazil) Bárbara Aguiar	Muay Hardcore	Bangkok, Thailand	Decision (Unanimous)	3	3:00
2021-03-21	Draw	(Luxembourg) Marie Heinz	Muay Thai Super Champ	Bangkok, Thailand	Draw	3	3:00
2020-10-31	Win	(United States) Angela Chang	Muay Hardcore	Bangkok, Thailand	Decision (Unanimous)	3	3:00
2020-09-27	Win	(Brazil) Allycia Rodrigues	Chang Muaythai Kiatpetch, Or.Tor.Gor.3 Stadium	Nonthaburi province, Thailand	Decision	5	2:00
For the vacant Thai Female Super Flyweight (115 lbs) title and a one million baht side-bet.
2020-02-01	Win	(Argentina) Daniela Lopez	Muay Hardcore	Bangkok, Thailand	Decision (Unanimous)	3	3:00
2019-12-21	Win	(United Kingdom) Yasmin Nazary	Muay Hardcore	Bangkok, Thailand	Decision (Unanimous)	3	3:00
2019-11-16	Win	(Brazil) Allycia Rodrigues	Muay Hardcore	Bangkok, Thailand	Decision (Unanimous)	3	3:00
2019-10-31	Win	(United States) Sylvie von Duuglas-Ittu		Khorat, Thailand	Decision	5	3:00
2019-09-14	Win	(Thailand) Naruemon Longlom	Singmanassak Muaythai School	Pathum Thani, Thailand	KO	3	
2019-03-17	Loss	(Brazil) Allycia Rodrigues	Miracle Muay Thai Festival, Semi Fnal	Ayutthaya, Thailand	Decision	3	2:00
2018-08-20	Win	(Thailand) Petganya Sor Puangthong	Suranaree Korat Muay Thai Arena	Khorat, Thailand	Decision	5	2:00
2017-04	Win	(Thailand) Nong Nut Lookboonmee	Rajasi Muay Thai Championship in Korat – Star of Wat Kok, 2nd Edition	Khorat, Thailand	Decision	5	2:00

Amateur Kickboxing and Muay Thai Record
Date	Result	Opponent	Event	Location	Method	Round	Time
2022-12	Win	(Vietnam) Hai Linh Bui	2022 Asian Kickboxing Championships, Final	Bangkok, Thailand	Decision		
Wins WAKO 2022 Asian Kickboxing Championships Low Kick -52 kg Gold Medal.
2022-10	Win	(Thailand) Wipada Srihong	2022 Thailand Kickboxing Championship, Final	Bangkok, Thailand	Decision		
Wins 2022 Thailand Kickboxing Championship Low Kick -52 kg 1st place.
2022-05	Loss	(Indonesia) Amanda La Loupatty	2021 SEA Games Vietnam, Semi Finals	Bắc Ninh, Vietnam	Decision (2:1)		
2017-08	Loss	(Australia) Tia Gail Nikpalj	2017 IFMA Youth World Championships, Semi Final	Bangkok, Thailand	Decision (30:27)		
2017-08	Win	(Netherlands) Asena Korsten	2017 IFMA Youth World Championships, Quarter Final	Bangkok, Thailand	Decision (30:27)		

== See also ==
- List of female kickboxers
- List of WBC Muaythai female world champions
- Bangla Boxing Stadium
