= Ratchadaphon Wihantamma =

Thai Muay Thai Kickboxer

- Born: Ratchadaphon Wihantamma; May 9, 1996 (age 30); Sing Buri, Thailand
- Other names: Sawsing Sor Sopit
- Height: 160 cm (5 ft 3 in)
- Weight: 57 kg (126 lb; 9 st 0 lb)
- Division: Featherweight
- Style: Muay Thai
- Fighting out of: Thailand
- Years active: 2005-2022

Kickboxing record
- Total: 203
- Wins: 170
- By knockout: 83
- Losses: 30
- Draws: 3

Ratchadaphon Wihantamma known as Sawsing Sor Sopit (สาวสิงห์ ส.โสพิศ) is a Thai Muay Thai fighter. She is a former WMC, World Muay Thai Organization women's featherweight world champion. Wihantamma also gained several medals in IFMA World Muaythai Championships, World Combat Games, Asian Indoor and Martial Arts Games and Asian Beach Games.

== Muay Thai career ==
=== World Professional Muaythai Federation ===
On August 25, 2015, she challenged Ashley Nichols for the W.P.M.F Interim World Featherweight title and lost by decision.

=== International Federation of Muaythai Associations ===
In 2016, Wihantamma won a bronze medal at the IFMA World Muay Thai Championships in Jönköping. In the same year, she also won a gold medal at the World Combat Games in Saint Petersburg. In 2013, she won a gold medal at the Asian Beach Games in Da Nang. In 2013 and 2017, Wihantamma won two gold medals at the Asian Indoor and Martial Games in Bangkok and Ashgabat.

=== World Muay Thai Council ===
In January 2017, she challenged Candice Mitchell and won the WMC World Featherweight title by decision.

== Championships and awards ==
- Amateur
  - (gold) 2017 Asian Indoor and Martial Arts Games -60 kg
  - (bronze) 2016 IFMA World Muay Thai Championship -57 kg
  - (bronze) 2017 IFMA World Muay Thai Championship -57 kg
  - (gold) 2016 Asian Beach Games -57 kg
  - (gold) 2013 World Combat Games -54 kg
  - (gold) 2013 Asian Indoor and Martial Arts Games -54 kg

Professional

- World Muay Thai Council
  - 2010 WMC World 115 lbs Champion
  - 2017 WMC World 135 lbs Champion
- World Professional Muaythai Federation
  - 2012 WPMF World Featherweight Champion (one defense)
  - 2013 WPMF World Featherweight Champion
- Onesongchai
  - 2012 S-1 World 126 lbs Champion
- World Muay Thai Organization
  - 2019 WMO World Featherweight Champion
- Muay Thai Super Champ
  - 2020 Muay Thai Super Champ Tournament Winner

== Muaythai record ==
Professional Muay Thai record
170 Wins (83 (T)KOs), 30 Losses, 4 Draws
Date	Result	Opponent	Event	Location	Method	Round	Time
2021-12-25	Draw	Bárbara Aguiar	Muay Hardcore	Bangkok, Thailand	Decision	3	3:00
2021-11-20	Loss	Bárbara Aguiar	Muay Hardcore	Bangkok, Thailand	Decision	3	3:00
2021-10-09	Win	Negin Shahinfar	Muay Hardcore	Phuket, Thailand	TKO	1	
2021-04-04	Win	Bárbara Aguiar	Super Champ Muay Thai	Phuket, Thailand	Decision (Unanimous)	3	3:00
2021-03-06	Win	Dilshoda Umarova	Muay Hardcore	Bangkok, Thailand	Decision (Unanimous)	3	3:00
2020-12-12	Win	Kristin Carlos	Muay Hardcore	Bangkok, Thailand	Decision (Unanimous)	3	3:00
2020-10-23	Loss	Smilla Sundell	Super Champ Muay Thai	Bangkok, Thailand	Decision	3	3:00
2020-08-08	Win	Erin Kowal	Muay Hardcore	Bangkok, Thailand	Decision (Unanimous)	3	3:00
2020-02-23	Win	Ruslana Vyniavska	Super Champ Muay Thai, Final	Bangkok, Thailand	Decision	3	3:00
Won Super Champ Muay Thai -57kg Title.
2020-02-23	Win	Malena Garcia	Super Champ Muay Thai, Semi Final	Bangkok, Thailand	Decision	3	3:00
2020-01-19	Draw	Ruslana Vyniavska	Super Champ Muay Thai	Bangkok, Thailand	Decision	3	3:00
2019-12-12	Win	Souris Manfredi	Muay Hardcore	Bangkok, Thailand	Decision	3	3:00
2019-11-10	Win	Marina Bernardes	Super Champ Muay Thai	Bangkok, Thailand	Decision	3	3:00
2019-10-19	Win	Brooke Farrell	Muay Hardcore	Bangkok, Thailand	Decision	3	3:00
2019-07-07	Draw	Brooke Farrell	Super Champ Muay Thai	Bangkok, Thailand	Decision	3	3:00
2019-03-16	Win			Pattaya, Thailand	KO	1	
2019-02-05	Win	Maisha Katz	Thailand Sports Authority Event	Bangkok, Thailand	Decision	5	3:00
Won WMO Featherweight World Title
2018-02-06	Win	Natalie Hochimingym	Muay Thai Day 6	Bangkok, Thailand	Decision	5	2:00
2017-09-08	Win	Laura TigerMuayThai	Samui Fight	Ko Samui, Thailand	Decision	3	3:00
2017-01-28	Win	Candice Mitchell	WMC Women's Fight World Championship	Hua Hin, Thailand	Decision (Unanimous)	5	3:00
Won WMC Featherweight world Title.
2016-08-25	Loss	Ashley Nichols	Chokchai Stadium Opening Night	Phuket, Thailand	Decision (Unanimous)	5	3:00
For W.P.M.F Interim Featherweight world Title.
2014-02-15	Win	Candice Mitchell	Santai Festival	Chiang Mai, Thailand	Decision (Unanimous)	3	3:00
2014-09-05	Win	Mangonkaw Ponlamaiplawgatt		Bangkok, Thailand	Decision (Unanimous)	3	3:00
2014-07-18	Loss	Gong Li Yue		Bangkok, Thailand	Decision (Unanimous)	3	3:00
2014-02-15	Win	Farida Okiko	King's Birthday Celebration	Bangkok, Thailand	Decision (Unanimous)	5	2:00
2013-12-24	Win	Camila Pacheco		Bangkok, Thailand	TKO	3	
2013-04-12	Win	Theresa Carter	King's Birthday WPMF	Bangkok, Thailand	Decision	5	2:00
Won WPMF World 126 lbs Title.
2013-02-05	Win		Yod Muay Thai Nai Khanom Ton, Huamark Stadium	Bangkok, Thailand	Decision	5	2:00
Won Nai Khanom Ton 130 lbs Title.
2012-12-04	Loss	Kate Houston	King's Birthday	Bangkok, Thailand	Decision	5	2:00
Loses WPMF World Featherweight Title.
2012-11-11	Win	AZUMA	M-1 Muay Thai Challenge Sutt Yod Muaythai vol.4 Part1	Tokyo, Japan	Decision (Unanimous)	5	2:00
Defends WPMF World Featherweight Title.
2012-10-10	Draw	Iman Barlow	Muay Thai event in Thailand	Pattaya, Thailand	Decision	3	3:00
2012-05-29	Loss	Zaza Sor Aree		Saraburi, Thailand	Decision (Unanimous)	3	3:00
2012-05-30	Win	Alexis Rufus	Rangsit Stadium	Bangkok, Thailand	Decision (Unanimous)	5	3:00
2012-03-25	Win	AZUMA	M-1 Muay Thai Challenge Sutt Yod Muaythai vol.1 Part1	Tokyo, Japan	TKO (Doctor stoppage)	4	0:35
Won vacant WPMF World Featherweight Title.
	Loss	Chommanee Sor Taehiran		Thailand	Decision	5	2:00
	Win	Chommanee Sor Taehiran		Thailand	Decision	5	2:00
	Win	Chommanee Sor Taehiran		Thailand	Decision	5	2:00
	Loss	Chommanee Sor Taehiran		Thailand	Decision	5	2:00
Legend: Win Loss Draw/No contest Notes

== Amateur Muaythai record ==
Amateur Muaythai record
11 wins, 1 losses, 0 draws
Date	Result	Opponent	Event	Location	Method	Round	Time
2018-05-13	Loss	(Russia) Maria Klimova	2018 IFMA World Championship	Cancun, Mexico	Decision (27-30)	3	3:00
2017-09-19	Win	(Iran) Saeideh Ghaffari	2017 Asian Indoor and Martial Arts Games, Final	Ashgabat, Turkmenistan	Decision (30-27)	3	3:00
Won Asian Indoor and Martial Arts Games Gold Medal.
2017-09-20	Win	(China) Chen Linling	2017 Asian Indoor and Martial Arts Games, Semi Final	Ashgabat, Turkmenistan	Decision (30-27)	3	3:00
2017-05-08	Loss	(Sweden) Patricia Axling	2017 IFMA World Muaythai Championships, Semi Final	Minsk, Belarus	Decision (29-28)	3	3:00
Won IFMA World Muaythai Championships Bronze Medal.
2017-05-07	Win	(Russia) Kristina Kuznecova	2017 IFMA World Muaythai Championships, Quarter Final	Minsk, Belarus	Decision (30-27)	3	3:00
2017-05-06	Win	(India) Anusha Pinto	2017 IFMA World Muaythai Championships, 1/8 Final	Minsk, Belarus	TKO	1	
2016-09-26	Win	(Vietnam) Phạm Thị Thu	2016 Asian Beach Games, Final	Da Nang, Vietnam	Decision (30-27)	3	3:00
Won Asian Beach Games Gold Medal.
2016-09-25	Win	(Turkmenistan) Ýaňyl Kawisowa	2016 Asian Beach Games, Semi Final	Da Nang, Vietnam	RSCO	3	3:00
2016-05-23	Win	(Sweden) Patricia Axling	2016 IFMA World Muaythai Championships, Semi Final	Jönköping, Sweden	Decision (30-27)	3	3:00
Won IFMA World Muaythai Championships Bronze Medal.
2013-07-02	Win	(Vietnam) Phan Thị Ngọc Linh	2013 Asian Indoor and Martial Arts Games, Final	Incheon, South Korea	Decision (5-0)	3	3:00
Won Asian Indoor and Martial Arts Games Gold Medal.
2013-07-01	Win	(South Korea) Kim Min-ji	2013 Asian Indoor and Martial Arts Games, Semi Final	Incheon, South Korea	RET	3	3:00
2013-06-30	Win	(Philippines) Myra Adin	2013 Asian Indoor and Martial Arts Games, Quarter Final	Incheon, South Korea	RSCO	3	3:00
2013-10-23	Win	(Russia) Natalya Dyachkova	2013 World Combat Games, Final	Saint Petersburg, Russia	Decision (30-27)	3	3:00
Won World Combat Games Gold Medal.
2013-10-21	Win	(Canada) Ashley Nichols	2013 World Combat Games, Semi Final	Saint Petersburg, Russia	Decision (30-27)	3	3:00
2013-10-19	Win	(China) Yang Yang	2013 World Combat Games, Quarter Final	Saint Petersburg, Russia	Decision (30-27)	3	3:00
Legend: Win Loss Draw/No contest Notes

== Lethwei record ==
Lethwei record
1 fights, 0 wins, 0 loss, 1 draw
Date	Result	Opponent	Event	Location	Method	Round	Time
2019-08-18	Draw	(Myanmar) Vero Nika	Myanmar Lethwei World Championship 4	Yangon, Myanmar	Draw	4	3:00
Legend: Win Loss Draw/No contest Notes

== See also ==
- Muaythai at the 2017 Asian Indoor and Martial Arts Games
- Muaythai at the 2016 Asian Beach Games
- Muaythai at the 2013 Asian Indoor and Martial Arts Games
- Muay Thai at the 2013 World Combat Games
