= Cindy Silvestre =

Frebch kickboxer

- Born: 12 February 1993 (age 33); Besançon, France
- Other names: Cindy Looksuan
- Nickname: Cyborg
- Nationality: French
- Height: 1.60 m (5 ft 3 in)
- Weight: 57 kg (126 lb; 9 st 0 lb)
- Division: Bantamweight; Featherweight
- Style: Kickboxing
- Fighting out of: Dole, France
- Team: LookSuan MuayThai Camp; Khaopetch; AssTiger Boxing Club
- Trainer: Roblet Denis
- Years active: 2015 - present

Kickboxing record
- Total: 169
- Wins: 112
- By knockout: 21
- Losses: 56
- By knockout: 5
- Draws: 1

Other information
- Occupation: Coach at AssTiger Boxing Club
- University: University of Burgundy
- Boxing record from BoxRec

Cindy Silvestre (born 12 February 1993) is a French kickboxer and Muay Thai fighter who has been professionally competing since 2015.

She is the former ISFA World K-1 champion, two time FFKMDA Muay Thai champion, ICO European and Intercontinental Muay Thai champion, as well as WMO, AFSO and IMTF World champion.

== Muay Thai & kickboxing career ==
At the amateur level, she was the five-time national junior kickboxing and one time senior champion, and two time national amateur Muay Thai champion.

Cindy started combat sports with full-contact, a discipline where she holds a title of semi-pro French champion.

She started Muay Thai in 2016 and that same year, she won her first world title in the -57 kg category in Thailand. She defended the title the following year.

As of 2022, she holds 7 world titles in Muay Thai and 1 world title in K-1.

As of 2022, her professional record is 75 victories in 114 fights.

She has fought on the Glory and Enfusion promotions in Europe and the Super Champ, Muay Hardcore, Lumpinee Stadium, Thai Fight, Fairtex Fight, Rajadamnern World Series and Siam Real Combat promotions in Thailand.

Nicknamed French Cyborg, she has an aggressive and powerful fighting style.

On 27 October 2026, Cindy Silvestre lost to Iranian fighter Fa-ezeh Baansilapathai in a five-round kickboxing bout for the Siam Real Combat 115-pound title.

== Championships and accomplishments ==
- Fédération Française de Kick Boxing, Muaythaï et Disciplines Associées
  - FFKMDA National Muay Thai Championship -56 kg (Two times)
- International Combat Organization
  - ICO European Muay Thai Championship -53.5 kg
  - ICO Intercontinental Muay Thai Championship -60 kg
- ISFA
  - ISFA World K-1 Bantamweight Championship -54 kg
- World Muaythai Organization
  - WMO World Championship (Two times) -57 and 54 kg
- All Fight System Organization
  - AFSO World Muay Thai Championship -53.5 kg
- International Muaythai Federation
  - IMTF World Championship -51 kg
- World Total Fighting Federation
  - WTFF World Championship -55 kg
- Magic Pro Fight
  - Magic Pro Fight International Championship
- Koh Chang
  - Koh Chang Championship

== Fight record ==
Professional Kickboxing Record
112 Wins (21 (T)KO's), 56 Losses, 1 Draw, 0 No Contest
Date	Result	Opponent	Event	Location	Method	Round	Time
2026-10-27	Loss	(Iran) Fa-ezeh Baansilapathai	Siam Real Combat	Bangkok, Thailand	Decision	5	
For the Siam Real Combat Women's Kickboxing Championship (115 lbs) title.
2026-09-08	Loss	(Iran) Fa-ezeh Baansilapathai	Siam Real Combat	Bangkok, Thailand	Decision		
2026-08-09	Loss	(Thailand) Dangkongfah KhunPon Martial Arts	MAIN Championship	Colombo, Sri Lanka	Decision	3	3:00
2026-07-25	Loss	(Germany) Angelique Noi	Lumpinee SUPER CHAMP	Bangkok, Thailand	Decision	3	2:00
2026-06-02	Loss	(Iran) Fa-ezeh Baansilapathai	Siam Real Combat	Bangkok, Thailand	Decision		
2025-12-29	Loss	(Thailand) TheStar Sitcho	Max Muay Thaï	Pattaya, Thailand	Decision		
2025-12-20	Win	Kan Kaew Sit Jae Film	Koh Chang (113 lbs Champ)		Décision		
2025-10-18	Win	(Brazil) Kétlin Toniollo	Magic Pro Night		Décision		
Wins the Magic Pro Fight International title.
2025-08-16	Loss	(France) Justine Desportes	LWC Super Champ	Bangkok, Thailand	Décision		
2025-07-28	Win	(China) Yan Yuxin	CN 19		Décision		
2025-06-28	Loss	(Thailand) Karaked Por.Muangphet	LWC Super Champ, Tour 1 Tournament	Bangkok, Thailand	Décision		
2025-06-28	Win	(Thailand) Masami Kiat Songrit	LWC Super Champ, Tour 1 Tournament	Bangkok, Thailand	Décision		
2025-05-24	Win	(Switzerland) Sonia Dinh	Phenix Boxing Only		Décision		
2025-03-07	Loss	(Turkey) Nefise Delikurt	The Battle's Queen		Décision		
2025-03-07	Win	(Cambodia) Nou Srey Pov	The Battle's Queen		Décision		
2025-02-05	Win		Jitmuangnon Stadium	Thailand	Décision		
2024-12-31	Win	(Spain) Julia Barca	All Star Fight Elite Fighter	Bangkok, Thailand	Décision		
2024-11-15	Loss		Lot Kratong		Décision		
2024-08-17	Loss	(Thailand) Pancake CK Muaythai Gym	LWC Super Champ	Bangkok, Thailand	Décision		
2024-05-05	Win	(Cambodia) Sei Vichchaka	MAS Fight Cambodia	Cambodia	TKO	3	
2024-04-27	Win	(Thailand) Nianghong Langprasert	LWC Super Champ	Bangkok, Thailand	Décision		
2024-03-31	Loss	(Thailand) Phayasingha "Sor Sommit" Singha	Thai Fight League	Thailand	Décision		
2024-02-17	Loss	(Thailand) Karaked KrueangduemCommandoGym	LWC Super Champ	Bangkok, Thailand	Décision		
2024-02-17	Win	(Brazil) Julia Silveira	LWC Super Champ	Bangkok, Thailand	Décision		
2023-12-23	Win	(Thailand) Thai-Ngan Lee	LWC Super Champ	Bangkok, Thailand	Décision		
2023-10-28	Loss	(Thailand) Narak	Rajadamnern World Series	Bangkok, Thailand	Décision	3	2:00
2023-06-24	Loss	(Thailand) Saorattana Sitkrujeab	LWC Super Champ	Bangkok, Thailand	Décision		
2023-05-13	Win	(Thailand) Zaidania Looksaikongdin	Rajadamnern World Series	Bangkok, Thailand	Décision	3	2:00
2023-04-08	Loss	(Israel) Shir Cohen	Fairtex Fight	Bangkok, Thailand	Décision		
2023-03-04	Win	(Thailand) KanchanaIsairi Por Nipapon	Fairtex Fight	Bangkok, Thailand	TKO	2	
2023-02-04	Win	(France) Anne Linh Nguyen	PSM Fight Night		Decision		
2022-12-13	Loss	(Thailand) Looknam Kor Glohmgliao	Lumpinee	Bangkok, Thailand	Decision		
2022-09-06	Win	(Thailand) Rungnapa Por.Muangphet	Fairtex Fight	Bangkok, Thailand	Decision		
2022-06-25	Loss	(France) Méghane Amouri	La Nuit des Lions II	Étampes, France	Decision		
2022-06-11	Win	(Italy) Luciana Germano	Star Fight	Annecy, France	Decision		
2022-04-23	Win	(Thailand) Sundania	Lumpinee Stadium	Bangkok, Thailand	Decision	5	3:00
2022-03-26	Loss	(Thailand) Mariya Mahachai	Descendants of the Empire IV	Bangkok, Thailand	Decision		
2022-03-05	Win	(Thailand) PetchJaras Btu	Muay Hardcore	Phuket, Thailand	KO	2	
2021-12-18	Loss	(Thailand) Phayasingh Phuket Singha Muay	Muay Hardcore	Phuket, Thailand	Decision	5	3:00
2021-10-16	Win	(France) Melissa Bounoua	Fighting Edition	Valenciennes, France	Decision	3	3:00
2021-10-02	Win	(Belgium) Ines El Salemy	Empire Fight	Montbéliard, France	Decision	5	3:00
2021-09-11	Loss	(Bulgaria) Teodora Kirilova	Pro Fight 18	Dupnitsa, Bulgaria	Decision	3	3:00
2021-08-21	Win	(Switzerland) Aline Seiberth	Fight Time	Recherswil, Switzerland	Decision	3	3:00
2021-07-04	Loss	(Thailand) Phetjee Jaa Or.Meekun	THAI FIGHT Strong, Queen’s Cup Flyweight tournament - Semifinal	Pattaya, Thailand	KO	2	
2020-03-07	Win	(Thailand) Thanonchanok Gilalampang	Warriors Fight 2	Chartres, France	Decision (Unanimous)	3	3:00
2020-02-11	Win	(Thailand) Saw Mueng Chang	Real Fight	Bangkok, Thailand	KO	2	
2020-02-02	Loss	(Thailand) Nanghong Liangprasert	Super Champ	Bangkok, Thailand	Decision (Unanimous)	3	3:00
2019-12-07	Loss	(Ukraine) Lena Ovchynnikova	LVIV Open Cup	Lviv, Ukraine	Decision (Unanimous)	5	2:00
For the WBC Muaythai Featherweight title.
2019-11-09	Loss	(France) Ines Pilutti	Lion Belt 7	Belfort, France	Decision (Majority)	3	3:00
Lion Belt Tournament Final.
2019-11-09	Win	(France) Erica Gatti	Lion Belt 7	Belfort, France	Decision (Unanimous)	3	3:00
Lion Belt Tournament Semi Final.
2019-10-12	Loss	(United Kingdom) Iman Barlow	A Night Of Muay Thai	Melton Mowbray, United Kingdom	TKO (Doctor stoppage)	3	
2019-09-09	Win	(Greece) Hara Dimitroula	Enfusion 87	Darmstadt, Germany	Decision (Unanimous)	3	3:00
2019-08-03	Loss	(England) Grace Spicer	Capital Punishment	Southampton, England	Decision (Unanimous)	5	2:00
For the IKF Muay Thai title.
2019-06-29	Win	(Italy) Roberta Sarcinella	Tournoi du Sor Sitkongnoï	Jonzac, France	Decision (Unanimous)	3	3:00
2019-06-08	Loss	(Scotland) Amy Pirnie	Blackpool Rebellion	Blackpool, England	TKO	3	
2019-05-04	Loss	(United Kingdom) Sophie Hawkswell	Johnny T’s And Paul Bates Show	Prestwich, England	TKO	4	
2019-04-13	Win	(France) Amandine Lambour	Enfusion 82	Orchies, France	TKO	3	
2019-03-20	Win	(Thailand) Supphanika Tanchoem	15th International Thai Martial Arts Festival 2019	Ayutthaya, Thailand	Decision (Unanimous)	3	3:00
Wins the IMTF title. -112 lb (-51 kg)
2019-03-18	Win	(Spain) Maria Phoumdom	15th International Thai Martial Arts Festival 2019	Ayutthaya, Thailand	TKO	1	
2019-03-16	Loss	(Australia) ?	WMO World Championship	Bangkok, Thailand	Decision (Unanimous)	3	3:00
2018-11-24	Loss	(France) Delphine Guénon	Superfight Boxing Art Tournament	Clichy, France	Decision (Unanimous)	3	3:00
2018-10-20	Loss	(Sweden) Sofia Olofsson	Glory 60: Lyon	Lyon, France	Decision (Unanimous)	3	3:00
2018-09-22	Win	(Italy) Laura Torre	Bodensee Fightnight VI	Pfullendorf, Germany	Decision (Unanimous)	3	3:00
Wins the AFSO Muay Thai title. -118 lb (-53.5 kg)
2018-07-01	Loss	(Netherlands) Georgina van der Linden	Ubeda Future Champs	Úbeda, Spain	Decision (Unanimous)	3	3:00
2018-06-16	Loss	(Sweden) Elna Nilsson	Queen of the Ring 3	Lund, Sweden	Decision (Unanimous)	5	3:00
For the ISKA European title.
2018-05-12	Loss	(Switzerland) Jessica MARAZZI	The Story 6	Olten, Switzerland	Decision		
2018-04-14	Win	(Netherlands) Arij Zaafouri	United Siam Fight	Le Mans, France	TKO (Corner Stoppage)	4	3:00
2018-04-07	Loss	(Spain) Atenea Flores Pertegas	CPI Fight Night	Donauwörth, Germany	Decision (Unanimous)	3	3:00
2018-03-31	Win	(Austria) Carina Greimel	Kick Boxing	Bar-le-Duc, France	Decision (Unanimous)	3	3:00
2018-03-21	Win	(China) Tchai Xnong	International & Thai Martial Arts Games And Festival	Bangkok, Thailand	Decision (Unanimous)	5	3:00
Wins the WMO World title. -119 lb (-54 kg)
2018-01-27	Loss	(Netherlands) Ella Grapperhaus	Power Women	Amsterdam, Netherlands	Decision (Split)	5	3:00
2018-01-20	Loss	(Slovakia) Viktoria Lipianska	Siam Fight 3	Terville, France	Decision (Majority)	3	3:00
2017-12-15	Loss	(Sweden) Patricia Axling	Ladies Fight Night 7: Double Trouble 1	Łódź, Poland	Decision (Unanimous)	3	3:00
2017-12-02	Loss	(Spain) Atenea Flores Pertegas	Knockout	Vaals, Netherlands	Decision (split)	3	3:00
2017-11-25	Loss	(France) Emma GONGORA	Nuit Des Champions	Marseille, France	Decision	3	3:00
2017-11-04	Win	(Italy) Barbara Ruffolo	Spirit Boxing Show 2	Aube, France	Decision (Split)	3	3:00
2017-10-14	Loss	(England) Iman Barlow	Assassins Muay Thai	Melton Mowbray, England	Decision (unanimous)	3	3:00
2017-09-30	Loss	(Italy) Chiara Vincis	International Fight Show	Loano, Italy	Decision (Unanimous)	3	3:00
2017-07-16	Loss	(Italy) Perla BRAGAGNOLO	Titolo Europeo Muay Thai	Turin, Italy	Decision		
2017-07-15	Loss	(Italy) Stella BARTOLETTI	Urbania KO III	Italy	Decision		
2017-06-24	Loss	(Italy) Jleana VALENTINO	The Night Of Kick And Punch	Milano, Italy	Decision		
2017-06-10	Loss	(Germany) Anke KEMMER	Fight Night Vol. III	Bacharach, Germany	Decision		
2017-06-03	Win	(France) Fanny Foures	Cavalaire Kickboxing Show 2	Cavalaire, France	Decision (Unanimous)	3	3:00
2017-05-27	Win	(Brazil) Sarah VUELNES	World Championship	Basel, Switzerland	Lost by retirement	1	
Wins the WTFF World Title. -121 lb (-55 kg)
2017-05-20	Loss	(France) Myriame Djedidi	La Nuit De L’Impact III	Saintes, France	Decision (Unanimous)	3	3:00
2017-04-29	Loss	(France) Soraya BUCHERIE	Golden Fight 5	La Courneuve, France	Decision		
2017-04-24	Win	(Germany) Tamara Platter	CPI Fight Night	Donauwörth, Germany	KO	3	
Wins the ISFA World K-1 title. -119 lb (-54 kg)
2017-04-01	Loss	(Spain) Iman GBHALOU	WBC Muaythai Show	Marbella, Spain	Decision		
For WBC European Title. -120 lb (-54.5 kg)
2017-03-20	Win	(Thailand) Anlay S. Somglenkun	WMO World Championship	Bangkok, Thailand	Decision (Overturned)	3	3:00
Win awarded to Silvestre after appeal of original decision. Wins the WMO World Title -126 lb (-57 kg)
2017-03-04	Loss	(United Kingdom) Ruth Ashdown	Pantheon Fight Series: Imperium	Hastings, England	Decision (Unanimous)	3	3:00
2017-02-04	Loss	(Germany) Yasemin COLAK	Nuit Des Guerriers 2	Pont-à-Mousson, France	Decision (Split)		
2017-02-04	Loss	(France) Marine LEFEBVRE	La Nuit Des Challenges 17	Mulhouse, France	Decision		
2016-10-30	Win	(Italy) Antonella Zizzi	Campionato Interregionale	Ariccia, Italy	Decision (Unanimous)	6	3:00
Wins the ICO Intercontinental title. -118 lb (-53.5 kg)
2016-05-07	Win	(England) January Wynne	?	Rome, Italy	Decision (Unanimous)	5	3:00
Wins the ICO European title.
2016-05-07	Win	(Thailand) Sumantra Bankam	?	Bangkok, Thailand	Decision (Unanimous)	5	3:00
2016-03-18	Win	(Thailand) NONGOUM Por Niramon	WMO World Championship		Decision		
Wins the WMO World title. -126 lb (-57 kg)
2016-01-09	Loss	(Italy) Donatella PANU	La Nuit Des Sports De Combat	Ajaccio, France	Decision		
For the WTKA World Title. -132 lb (-60 kg)
2015-10-24	Loss	(Germany) Yasemin COLAK	Kings of Muay Thai 8	Luxembourg, France	Lost by retirement	1	
2015-06-20	Loss	(France) Katia SEMAIL	C-Fight V	Cusset, France	Decision		
For the FFKMDA National Title. -126 lb (-57 kg).
2015-06-06	Loss	(France) Jennifer COLOMB	Challenge Cup WMC MuayThaï Elite	Orléans, France	Decision (unanimous)		
2015-04-18	Loss	(Italy) Chiara LAURORA	Boxe Thaïlandaise	Arbent, France	Decision		
Legend: Win Loss Draw/No contest Notes

== Lethwei record ==
Professional Lethwei record
0 wins (0 (T)KOs), 0 losses, 0 draws
Date	Result	Opponent	Event	Location	Method	Round	Time
2026-11-14	Draw	(Myanmar) Naw Ohn Mar Soe	LFC 1 – The Legacy Begins	Yangon, Myanmar	Draw	4	3:00
Legend: Win Loss Draw/No contest Notes

== Professional boxing record ==
1 fight	1 win	0 losses
By knockout	0	0
By decision	1	0
By disqualification	0	0
Draws	0	
No contests	0	

Result	Record	Opponent	Type	Round, Time	Date	Location	Notes
Win	1–0	(Thailand) Phumarin Yoohanngoh	Decision, Points	6 Rounds, 12:00 Total	September 3, 2022	Bangkok, Thailand	The Fighter

== See also ==
- List of female kickboxers
