= Bárbara Aguiar =

Thai Muay Thai kickboxer (born 1995)

- Born: Bárbara de Castro Aguiar; October 10, 1995 (age 31); Brazil
- Height: 166 cm (5 ft 5 in)
- Weight: 53 kg (117 lb; 8 st 5 lb)
- Style: Muay Thai; Muay Khao
- Fighting out of: Phuket, Thailand
- Team: Phuket Fight CLub (2020 - Present)

Professional boxing record
- Total: 51
- Wins: 40
- By knockout: 9
- Losses: 9
- Draws: 2

Bárbara Aguiar is a Brazilian Muay Thai fighter. She is a former WBC Muay Thai world champion and the first non thai woman to win a Rajadamnern Stadium title.

== Career ==
On November 22, 2022, Aguiar travelled to Australia to face Joanne La at Rebellion Muaythai 27 for the vacant WBC Muay Thai World Bantamweight title. She won the fight by unanimous decision.

Aguiar made her ONE Friday Fight debut in the Lumpinee Stadium on February 3, 2023, at ONE Friday Fights 3 against Dokmaipa Fairtex. She lost the fight by unanimous decision.

In 2024 Aguiar took part in the Rajadamnern World Series bantamweight tournament. In her first group fight happening on January 20, 2024, she faced Uma Gali. She won the fight by unanimous decision.

On September 21, 2024, Aguiar faced Kwanjai KwanjaiMuayThaiGym. She won the fight by decision and qualified for the Final 4.

Aguiar reached the final of the RWS tournament happening on December 14, 2024, where she rematched Kwanjai KwanjaiMuayThaiGym. She won the fight by knockout in the fourth round.

On February 22, 2025, Aguiar faced Marie Ruumet for the vacant Rajadamnern Stadium Women's Bantamweight title. She won the fight by unanimous decision.

== Championships and awards ==
- Rajadamnern Stadium
  - 2025 Rajadamnern Stadium Bantamweight (118 lbs) Champion
  - 2026 Rajadamnern Stadium Bantamweight (118 lbs) Champion
  - 2024 Rajadamnern World Series Bantamweight (118 lbs) Winner
- World Boxing Council Muay Thai
  - 2022 WBC Muay Thai World Bantamweight Champion

Awards

- 2024 Fight Record International Female Fighter of the Year

== Muaythai record ==
Professional Muay Thai record
39 Wins (9 (T)KOs), 9 Losses, 2 Draws
Date	Result	Opponent	Event	Location	Method	Round	Time
2026-02-07	Win	(Canada) Morgane Mary-Pouliot	Rajadamnern World Series	Bangkok, Thailand	Decision (Unanimous)	5	2:00
Wins the vacant Rajadamnern Stadium Women's Bantamweight (118 lbs) title.
2025-10-04	Win	(Brazil) Maria Eduarda	Rajadamnern World Series	Bangkok, Thailand	Decision (Split)	5	2:00
Aguiar was stripped of the Rajadamnern Stadium Women's Bantamweight (118 lbs) title after missing weight Only Eduarda could win it.
2025-02-22	Win	(Estonia) Marie Ruumet	Rajadamnern World Series	Bangkok, Thailand	Decision (Unanimous)	5	2:00
Wins the vacant Rajadamnern Stadium Women's Bantamweight (118 lbs) title
2024-12-14	Win	(Thailand) Kwanjai KwanjaiMuayThaiGym	Rajadamnern World Series - Final	Bangkok, Thailand	KO (Elbow and knees)	4	
Wins the 2024 Rajadamnern World Series Women's Bantamweight (118 lbs) Tournament title.
2024-11-02	Win	(Thailand) Somratsamee Manopgym	Rajadamnern World Series - Final 4	Bangkok, Thailand	Decision (Unanimous)	3	2:00
2024-09-21	Win	(Thailand) Kwanjai KwanjaiMuayThaiGym	Rajadamnern World Series	Bangkok, Thailand	Decision (Unanimous)	3	2:00
2024-08-17	Loss	(Estonia) Marie Ruumet	Rajadamnern World Series	Bangkok, Thailand	Decision (Unanimous)	3	2:00
2024-05-11	Win	(Thailand) Phayasingha Sor.Sommit	Rajadamnern World Series	Bangkok, Thailand	Decision (Unanimous)	3	2:00
2024-01-20	Win	(Sweden) Uma Gali	Rajadamnern World Series	Bangkok, Thailand	Decision (Unanimous)	3	2:00
2023-08-19	Draw	(Scotland) Judy SinbiMuayThai	Sinbi Muay Thai Stadium	Phuket, Thailand	Decision	3	3:00
2023-02-03	Loss	(Thailand) Dokmaipa Fairtex	ONE Friday Fights 3, Lumpinee Stadium	Bangkok, Thailand	Decision (Unanimous)	3	3:00
2022-11-28	Win	(Australia) Joanne La	Rebellion Muaythai 27	Melbourne, Australia	Decision (Unanimous)	5	3:00
Wins the vacant WBC Muay Thai World Bantamweight (118 lbs) title.
2022-10-22	Loss	(Greece) Fani Peloumpi	Fairtex Fight Extreme	Bangkok, Thailand	Decision (Split)	3	3:00
2022-08-18	Win	(Netherlands) Quinty Klein	Patong Boxing Stadium	Phuket, Thailand	Decision (Split)	5	2:00
Wins the Patong Stadium 140 lbs title.
2022-07-27	Win	(Cambodia) Toun Sreypin	World Fight Tournament	Cambodia	TKO (Knees)	3	2:07
2022-05-05	Win	(Italy) Lena Nokcer	Patong Boxing Stadium	Phuket, Thailand	Decision	5	2:00
Wins the Patong Stadium Bantamweight title.
2022-03-19	Win	(Thailand) Buakaew Kiatsombat	Muay Hardcore	Bangkok, Thailand	Decision	3	3:00
2022-01-15	Win	(Thailand) Pornpan Kruangduem	Muay Hardcore	Bangkok, Thailand	Decision	3	3:00
2021-12-25	Draw	(Thailand) Sawsing Sor.Sopit	Muay Hardcore	Bangkok, Thailand	Decision	3	3:00
2021-11-20	Win	(Thailand) Sawsing Sor.Sopit	Muay Hardcore	Bangkok, Thailand	Decision	3	3:00
2021-10-09	Win	(Thailand) Dangkongfah Jaosurenoi	Muay Hardcore	Bangkok, Thailand	Decision	3	3:00
2021-04-04	Loss	(Thailand) Sawsing Sor.Sopit	Super Champ Muay Thai	Phuket, Thailand	Decision (Unanimous)	3	3:00
2021-03-14	Win	(Thailand) Kwanjai KwanjaiMuayThaiGym	Muay Thai Super Champ	Bangkok, Thailand	TKO	3	
2020-10-17	Loss	(Thailand) Phetjeeja Lukjaoporongtom	Thai Fight Begins	Nonthaburi, Thailand	Decision	3	3:00
2020-09-26	Win	(Thailand) Petchkanya AyothayaFightGym	Muay Hardcore	Bangkok, Thailand	Decision (Unanimous)	3	3:00
2020-08-15	Win	(Thailand) Jomthap AyothayaFightGym	Muay Hardcore	Bangkok, Thailand	Decision	3	3:00
2020-08-01	Win	(Thailand) Kulabkhem Petchphosai	Muay Hardcore	Bangkok, Thailand	Decision	3	3:00
2020-02-24	Win	(Sweden)	Patong Boxing Stadium	Phuket, Thailand	Decision	5	2:00
Wins the vacant Patong Stadium title.
2020-02-24	Win	(France) Caroline	Patong Boxing Stadium	Phuket, Thailand	Decision	5	2:00
2019-07-14	Loss	(Brazil) Luara Marciano	Portuários Stadium - Super Girls	São Paulo, Brazil	Decision	5	3:00
For the vacant Portuários Stadium 55kg title.
2019-06-23	Win	(Brazil) Kemilyn Keké	Fight for Honor 5	São Paulo, Brazil	Decision	5	3:00
2019-04-13	Win	(Brazil) Andressa Tratorzinho	Chakri Champions 3	São Paulo, Brazil	Decision (Unanimous)	5	3:00
2019-03-10	Win	(Brazil) Jaqueline Oliveira	War Muaythai, Final	São Paulo, Brazil	Decision	3	3:00
2019-03-10	Win	(Brazil) Mel Silva	War Muaythai, Semifinals	São Paulo, Brazil	Decision	3	3:00
2019-01-26	Win	(Brazil) Camila Trindade	1º Desafio de Muaythai – Tremendão Fight	Brazil	Decision	3	3:00
2018-11-02	Win	(Brazil) Grazi Silva	Adrenalina Fight	São Paulo, Brazil	TKO	5	
2018-07-14	Win	(Brazil) Laryssa Docinho	Portuários Stadium	Santos, São Paulo, Brazil	Decision	3	3:00
2018-04-21	Win	(Brazil) Tarciara Santos	Warriors of The Ring	Brazil	Decision	5	3:00
Legend: Win Loss Draw/No contest Notes
