= Smilla Sundell =

Swedish Muay Thai kickboxer (born 2004)

- Born: Smilla Sundell; 12 November 2004 (age 21); Sundbyberg, Sweden
- Other names: The Hurricane; Smilla Fairtex
- Height: 5 ft 10 in (1.78 m)
- Weight: 135 lb (61 kg; 10 st)
- Division: Featherweight, Bantamweight (present)
- Reach: 69 in (175 cm)
- Style: Muay Thai
- Fighting out of: Stockholm, Sweden
- Team: Fairtex Gym (2019–2025); Diaz Combat Sports (2025–present)
- Years active: 2018–present

Kickboxing record
- Total: 42
- Wins: 36
- By knockout: 23
- Losses: 5
- Draws: 1

Mixed martial arts record
- Total: 3
- Wins: 3
- By knockout: 2
- By decision: 1
- Losses: 0

Other information
- Website: www.smillasundell.com
- Mixed martial arts record from Sherdog

Smilla Sundell (born 12 November 2004) is a Swedish Muay Thai fighter, kickboxer, and mixed martial artist. She competed in ONE Championship, where she was the former ONE Women's Strawweight Muay Thai World Champion. She currently competes in the women's Bantamweight division of the Ultimate Fighting Championship (UFC).

On 22 April 2022, Sundell became the youngest person to ever win a world title in Muay Thai by defeating Jackie Buntan to win the inaugural ONE Women's Strawweight Championship at 17 years and 5 months.

Since 2026, she has competed for the American MMA promotion Tuff-N-Uff, remaining undefeated through her first two professional bouts.

== Early life ==
Born in Sundbyberg, Sweden, Sundell started practicing karate at five years old for self-defense. She first tried her hand at Muay Thai at 10 or 11, while on vacation in Thailand. Sundell and her family moved to Ko Samui when she was 12 years old due to her parents' careers. She and her younger sister started practicing Muay Thai at a gym called Yodyut Muay Thai due to a lack of any other sports. When Sundell was 15, her family moved back to Sweden. But she stayed in Thailand to pursue Muay Thai. Running out of opponents in Ko Samui and inspired by watching Stamp Fairtex, in October 2019 she moved to Pattaya and joined the Fairtex Gym, where she lived and trained until 2025.

== Career ==
=== Early career ===
In early 2021, Sundell was ranked the number one female featherweight (57.153 kg) Muay Thai practitioner in the world by the WBC Muaythai at 16 years of age. She has notable victories over decorated champion Sawsing Sor Sopit, Ponpan Por.Muengpetch, and male fighter Bongsak Sitpholek. After amassing a record of 31 wins, 5 losses and 1 draw, Sundell signed with ONE Championship in 2021.

=== ONE Championship ===
In her ONE Championship debut at ONE: Full Circle on 25 February 2022, Sundell faced Australia's Diandra Martin. She won the fight by TKO in round 3. This was her first fight in four-ounce MMA gloves, which are smaller than the usual gloves used in Muay Thai.

==== ONE Women's Strawweight Muay Thai World Champion ====
Sundell faced Jackie Buntan for the inaugural ONE Women's Strawweight Muay Thai World Championship at ONE 156 on 22 April 2022. Sundell won by unanimous decision, making her the youngest person to ever win a world title. The fight also earned her a $50,000 Performance of the Night bonus.

Sundell made her kickboxing debut against Milana Bjelogrlić at ONE Friday Fights 18 on 26 May 2023. She won the fight by unanimous decision.

Sundell made her first Women's Muay Thai Strawweight World title defense against ONE Women's Atomweight Muay Thai World Champion Allycia Rodrigues at ONE Fight Night 14 on 29 September 2023. She retained the championship by a third-round technical knockout. She also earned her second $50,000 Performance of the Night bonus.

In the second title defense, Sundell faced Natalia Diachkova on 4 May 2024 at ONE Fight Night 22. At the weigh-ins, Sundell came in at 126.5 lb (after coming in at 127.7 lb in for an unofficial check two and a half hours into the weigh-ins), 1.5 pounds over the strawweight limit for a title fight. As a result, Sundell was stripped of the title and only Diachkova was eligible to win it. She won the fight via technical knockout in the second round.

On 19 August 2025, it was reported that Sundell was removed from the ONE roster, her weight having exceeded its heaviest women's weight class.

== Mixed martial arts career ==
On 26 October 2025, Las Vegas-based MMA promotion Tuff-N-Uff announced that Sundell had signed with the organization. Her professional MMA debut, originally scheduled for 12 December 2025 at Tuff-N-Uff 150 against Zurina Turrey, was cancelled after Turrey was not medically cleared to compete.

Sundell made her professional MMA debut on 22 January 2026 at Tuff-N-Uff 151 in Las Vegas, defeating Miranda Barber by technical knockout (knees and elbows) at 4:54 of the first round. Following the win, UFC president Dana White publicly praised her performance on social media.

On 5 June 2026, Sundell faced American fighter Maya Stewart in a bantamweight bout at Tuff-N-Uff 154, also in Las Vegas, winning by technical knockout (referee stoppage from strikes) at 1:28 of the second round to move to 2–0 as a professional.

On 13 October 2026, Sundell faced Aline Pereira at Dana White's Contender Series 96 and won the bout by unanimous decision, securing a contract with the UFC.

== Championships and awards ==
=== Muay Thai ===
- ONE Championship
  - ONE Women's Strawweight Muay Thai World Championship (One time; former)
    - Youngest person to win a world title in ONE history
    - One successful title defense
  - ONE Super Series Female Fighter of the Year 2022
  - Performance of the Night (Two times) vs. Jackie Buntan and Allycia Rodrigues

== Mixed martial arts record ==
Professional record breakdown
3 matches	3 wins	0 losses
By knockout	2	0
By decision	1	0

Res.	Record	Opponent	Method	Event	Date	Round	Time	Location	Notes
Win	3–0	Aline Pereira	Decision (unanimous)	Dana White's Contender Series 96	October 13, 2026	3	5:00	Las Vegas, Nevada, United States	
Win	2–0	Maya Stewart	TKO (punches and knees)	Tuff-N-Uff 154	June 5, 2026	2	1:28	Las Vegas, Nevada, United States	Bantamweight debut.
Win	1–0	Miranda Barber	TKO (knees and elbows)	Tuff-N-Uff 151	January 22, 2026	1	4:54	Las Vegas, Nevada, United States	Catchweight (150 lb) bout.

== Muay Thai and Kickboxing record ==
Muay Thai record
36 Wins (23 (T)KOs), 5 Losses, 1 Draw.
Date	Result	Opponent	Event	Location	Method	Round	Time	Notes
2024-05-04	Win	(Russia) Natalia Diachkova	ONE Fight Night 22	Bangkok, Thailand	TKO (knees and punches to the body)	2	2:59	
Sundell missed weight (126.5 lb) and was stripped of the ONE Women's Strawweight Muay Thai World Championship. Only Diachkova was eligible to win the title.
2023-09-29	Win	(Brazil) Allycia Rodrigues	ONE Fight Night 14	Kallang, Singapore	TKO (punches and elbows)	3	2:58	
Defended the ONE Women's Strawweight Muay Thai World Championship.
2023-05-26	Win	(Serbia) Milana Bjelogrlić	ONE Friday Fights 18	Bangkok, Thailand	Decision (Unanimous)	3	3:00	Kickboxing match
2022-04-22	Win	(United States) Jackie Buntan	ONE 156	Kallang, Singapore	Decision (Unanimous)	5	3:00	
Won ONE Women's Strawweight Muay Thai World Championship.
2022-02-25	Win	(Australia) Diandra Martin	ONE: Full Circle	Kallang, Singapore	TKO (3 Knockdowns)	3	1:35	
2020-12-13	Draw	(Thailand) Fahseethong Sitzoraueng	Super Champ Muay Thai	Bangkok, Thailand	Decision	3	3:00	
2020-10-23	Win	(Thailand) Sawsing Sor Sopit	Super Champ Muay Thai	Bangkok, Thailand	Decision	3	3:00	
2020-09-06	Win	(Thailand) Ponpan Por.Muengpetch	Super Champ Muay Thai	Bangkok, Thailand	KO (Knee to the head)	2	2:07	
2020-02-29	Win	(Australia) Nicola Callander	Rogue Muay Thai	Eatons Hill, Queensland, Australia	Decision (Unanimous)	5	2:00	
2019-11-28	Win	(Thailand) Gulapthip AyonGym	JF Stadium	Pattaya, Thailand	Decision (Unanimous)	5		
2019-09-19	Win	(Thailand) Nongjoy Sor.Kanjana	Chaweng Stadium	Koh Samui, Thailand	TKO (Knees)	3		
2019-07-26	Win	(Thailand) Payakesan	Chaweng Stadium	Koh Samui, Thailand	TKO	2		
2019-05-24	Win	(Estonia) Calista Parts	Bangla Boxing Stadium	Phuket, Thailand	Decision	5	2:00	
2019-03-16	Loss	(Thailand) Nongbew Thepsutin		Ayutthaya, Thailand	Decision (Unanimous)	5	3:00	
For the WPMF World 115 lbs title.
2019-02-03	Win	(United States) Justine	Samui International Stadium	Ko Samui, Thailand	TKO	3		
2018-12-20	Win		Samui International Stadium	Ko Samui, Thailand	TKO (Knees)	3		
2018-12-07	Win	(Thailand)	International Muay Kastsart University	Bangkok, Thailand	TKO	1		
Legend: Win Loss Draw/No contest Notes

== See also ==
- List of current UFC fighters
- List of female mixed martial artists
- List of ONE Championship champions
- List of ONE bonus award recipients
