= ONE Fight Night 8 =

Combat sport events in 2023

ONE Fight Night 8: Superlek vs. Williams
- Promotion: ONE Championship
- Date: March 25, 2023
- Venue: Singapore Indoor Stadium
- City: Kallang, Singapore

Event chronology
ONE Friday Fights 10: Yodkrisada vs. Thepthaksin	ONE Fight Night 8: Superlek vs. Williams	ONE Friday Fights 11: Superball vs. Kongklai 2

ONE Fight Night 8: Superlek vs. Williams was a combat sport event produced by ONE Championship that took place on March 25, 2023, at the Singapore Indoor Stadium in Kallang, Singapore.

== Background ==
A ONE Heavyweight World Championship title unification bout between current champion Arjan Bhullar and interim champion Anatoly Malykhin (also current ONE Light Heavyweight World Champion) was expected to headline the event. The pairing was previously scheduled to headline at ONE 161, but Bhullar withdraw due to suffering an injury in training and it was announced that Bhullar had surgery on the arm two weeks ago. However, the bout was removed from the event due to a shift in broadcaster commitments.

A ONE Flyweight Kickboxing World Championship bout between current champion Superlek Kiatmuu9 and current ONE Flyweight Muay Thai Champion, #1 ranking contender Rodtang Jitmuangnon was promoted to the new main event. However, Rodtang withdraw from the bout due to injury and was replaced by Danial Williams. Williams was scheduled to fight Rui Botelho and was replaced by Aslanbek Zikreev at a catchweight of 127 pounds.

A ONE Women's Atomweight Muay Thai World Championship title unification bout between current champion Allycia Rodrigues and interim champion Janet Todd (also current ONE Women's Atomweight Kickboxing World Champion) took place at the event. The pairing was previously scheduled to meet at ONE on Prime Video 5, but Todd pulled out from the event due to tests positive for COVID-19.

A women's atomweight bout between Itsuki Hirata and former Rizin Women's Super Atomweight Champion Seo Hee Ham took place at the event. The pairing was previously scheduled to meet at ONE 163, but the bout was scrapped for Hirata failed weight and hydration.

Reigning flyweight submission grappling champion Mikey Musumeci's sister Tammi Musumeci was booked to make her promotional debut at the event, taking on Bianca Basilio in a strawweight bout.

At the weigh-ins, Eddie Abasolo weighed in at 158.8 pounds, 3.8 pounds over the featherweight limit. The bout proceeded at catchweight with Abasolo was fined their purse of his purse, which went to his opponent Niclas Larsen.

== Results ==
Main card (Amazon Prime Video)
Weight class				Method	Round	Time	Notes
Flyweight Kickboxing	Superlek Kiatmuu9 (c)	def.	Danial Williams	KO (punches)	3	1:55	(Note: For the ONE Flyweight Kickboxing World Championship.)
Women's Atomweight Muay Thai	Allycia Rodrigues (c)	def.	Janet Todd (ic)	Decision (unanimous)	5	3:00	(Note: For the ONE Women's Atomweight Muay Thai World Championship.)
Women's Atomweight	Ham Seo-hee	def.	Itsuki Hirata	Decision (unanimous)	3	5:00
Featherweight	Akbar Abdullaev	def.	Oh Ho-taek	TKO (punches)	1	0:44
Strawweight Kickboxing	Zhang Peimian	def.	Torepchi Dongak	Decision (unanimous)	3	3:00
Catchweight (128 lbs) Muay Thai	Aslanbek Zikreev	def.	Rui Botelho	Decision (split)	3	3:00
Strawweight	Keito Yamakita	def.	Alex Silva	Decision (unanimous)	3	5:00
Preliminary card (YouTube / Watch ONE)
Catchweight (158.8 lbs) Muay Thai	Eddie Abasolo	def.	Niclas Larsen	KO (punch)	2	2:14	(Note: Originally a featherweight bout; Abasolo missed weight (158.8 lb).)
Women's Strawweight Muay Thai	Iman Barlow	def.	Ekaterina Vandaryeva	Decision (unanimous)	3	3:00
Women's Strawweight Submission Grappling	Tammi Musumeci	def.	Bianca Basílio	Decision (unanimous)	1	10:00

== Bonus awards ==
The following fighters received $50,000 bonuses.

- Performance of the Night: Superlek Kiatmuu9, Akbar Abdullaev and Zhang Peimian

== See also ==
- 2023 in ONE Championship
- List of ONE Championship events
- List of current ONE fighters
