= Phetjeeja Lukjaoporongtom =

Thai Muay Thai kickboxer

Phetjee Jaa
- Born: Ninlada Meekun; 31 December 2001 (age 24); Sisaket Province, Thailand
- Other names: Phetjee Jaa Or.Meekun (เพชรจีจ้า อ.มีคุณ); Petjeeja Or Boonchuay
- Height: 160 cm (5 ft 3 in)
- Weight: 52 kg (115 lb; 8 st)
- Division: Light flyweight Flyweight
- Reach: 63 in (160 cm)
- Style: Boxing, Muay Thai
- Stance: Orthodox
- Fighting out of: Thailand
- Team: Venum Training Camp Thailand
- Trainer: Mehdi Zatout

Professional boxing record
- Total: 5
- Wins: 5
- By knockout: 4

Kickboxing record
- Total: 220
- Wins: 210
- By knockout: 69
- Losses: 7
- Draws: 3

Other information
- Boxing record from BoxRec

Phetjeeja Lukjaoporongtom
Medal record

Women's Boxing

Southeast Asian Games

Representing Thailand
Bronze medal – third place	2021 Hanoi	-51 kg

Golden Girl Box Cup
Gold medal – first place	2019 Gothenburg	-48 kg

AIBA Youth World Championships
Silver medal – second place	2018 Budapest	-48 kg

Ninlada Meekun (Thai: นิลดา มีคุณ; born December 31, 2001), also known as Phetjeeja Lukjaoporongtom, is a Thai professional boxer, Muay Thai fighter, and kickboxer. She currently competes in the Women’s Atomweight Kickboxing and Muay Thai divisions of ONE Championship, where she is the current ONE Women's Atomweight Kickboxing World Champion. In Muay Thai, she has won world titles under the WPMF and WMC banners. In boxing, she has won a bronze medal at the 2021 SEA Games. As of September 22, 2026, Lukjaoporongtom is also ranked #1 in the ONE Women's Atomweight Muay Thai rankings.

As of January 2024, Beyond Kickboxing ranks her as the best Women’s Flyweight and women’s pound-for-pound kickboxer in the World.

== Biography and career ==
PhetJee Jaa started Muay Thai at the age of seven with her uncles. She rapidly became known in the provinces of Thailand as the girl who could defeat boys, at the age of 10 she had over 100 fights, more than 70 of them against boys. In the Or.Meekun and Petchrungurang camps, Phetjeejaa trained alongside her brother Wanmawin who went on to become a Rajadamnern stadium champion.

In 2013 PhetJee Jaa was stopped from competing against boys due to the laws of Thailand as her fights were starting to get televised. Having to compete only against women she is outweighed by most of her opponents.

In 2018 she joined the Thai national boxing team with the hope of qualifying for the Tokyo Olympics.

She made her professional boxing debut on August 3, 2022.

=== ONE Championship ===
After switching to professional boxing, Phetjeeja returned to Muay Thai at ONE Friday Fights 9 on March 17, 2023 against Fani Peloumpi. Phetjeeja won the fight by second-round technical knockout.

Phetjeeja faced Ines Pilutti at ONE Friday Fights 16 on May 12, 2023. She won the fight by first-round technical knockout. Afterwards, Phetjeeja was awarded a $10,000 Performance of the Night bonus, in addition to a $100,000 contract with ONE Championship.

Phetjeeja faced Lara Fernandez at ONE Fight Night 12 on July 15, 2023. She won by technical knockout 26 seconds into the fight. The victory also earned her a $50,000 Performance of the Night bonus.

Phetjeeja faced Celest Hansen on October 7, 2023, at ONE Fight Night 15. She won the fight via technical knockout doctor stoppage due to cut in the third round.

Phetjeeja faced Anissa Meksen for the interim ONE Women's Atomweight Kickboxing World Championship on ONE Friday Fights 46 on December 22, 2023. Phetjeeja won the bout via unanimous decision.

Phetjeeja faced Janet Todd for the ONE Women's Atomweight Kickboxing World Championship unification bout on March 9, 2024, at ONE Fight Night 20. She won the title via unanimous decision.

In the first title defense, Phetjeeja faced Kana Morimoto on March 23, 2025, at ONE 172. She won the bout via unanimous decision.

== Titles and accomplishments ==
=== Muay Thai ===
- World Professional Muaythai Federation
  - 2017 WPMF World 105 lbs Champion
- World Muay Thai Council
  - 2016 WMC World -45 kg Champion
- THAI FIGHT
  - 2021 THAI FIGHT Queen’s Cup -51 kg Champion
- ONE Championship
  - Performance of the Night (Two times) vs. Lara Fernandez and Ines Pilutti

=== Kickboxing ===
- ONE Championship
  - 2023 interim ONE Women's Atomweight Kickboxing World Championship
  - 2024 ONE Women's Atomweight Kickboxing World Championship
    - One successful title defense

=== Amateur boxing ===
- 2018 AIBA Women's Youth World Championships 48 kg (silver)
- 2018 ASBC Asian Confederation Youth Championships (silver)
- 2019 Golden Girl Box Cup 48 kg (gold) & Best Boxer of the competition
- 2021 SEA Games Women's 51 kg (bronze)

Awards

- 2025 Sports Authority of Thailand Non Traditional Muay Thai Fighter of the Year
- 2025 Sports Writers Association of Thailand Modified Muay Thai Fighter of the Year

== Professional boxing record ==
5 fights	5 wins	0 losses
By knockout	4	0
By decision	1	0

No.	Result	Record	Opponent	Type	Round, time	Date	Location	Notes
5	Win	5–0	Yun Ko Su	TKO	3 (8), 1:49	7 Dec 2022	Kiatkririn Fitness & Martial Art, Bang Phli district, Thailand	
4	Win	4–0	Jing Zhang	TKO	3 (8), 1:51	9 Nov 2022	Kiatkririn Fitness & Martial Art, Bang Phli district, Thailand	
3	Win	3–0	Tanyarak Gokbungkhla	TKO	3 (6), 0:29	19 Oct 2022	Kiatkririn Fitness & Martial Art, Bang Phli district, Thailand	
2	Win	2–0	Onya Riabroi	TKO	3 (6), 1:02	7 Sep 2022	Kiatkririn Fitness & Martial Art, Bang Phli district, Thailand	
1	Win	1–0	Yupin Tarapim	UD	4	3 Aug 2022	Kiatkririn Fitness & Martial Art, Bang Phli district, Thailand	

== Muay Thai and Kickboxing record ==
Professional Muay Thai and Kickboxing record
210 Wins (69 (T)KO's), 7 Losses, 3 Draws
Date	Result	Opponent	Event	Location	Method	Round	Time
2026-06-19	Loss	(Brazil) Allycia Rodrigues	ONE Friday Fights 159	Bangkok, Thailand	Decision (Split)	5	3:00
For the ONE Women's Atomweight Muay Thai World Championship.
2025-12-06	Win	(Poland) Martyna Kierczyńska	ONE Fight Night 38	Bangkok, Thailand	TKO (3 Knockdowns)	1	2:46
2025-03-23	Win	(Japan) Kana Morimoto	ONE 172	Saitama, Japan	Decision (Unanimous)	5	3:00
Defended the ONE Women's Atomweight Kickboxing World Championship.
2024-03-09	Win	(United States) Janet Todd	ONE Fight Night 20	Bangkok, Thailand	Decision (Unanimous)	5	3:00
Won and unified the ONE Women's Atomweight Kickboxing World Championship.
2023-12-22	Win	(Algeria) Anissa Meksen	ONE Friday Fights 46, Lumpinee Stadium	Bangkok, Thailand	Decision (Unanimous)	5	3:00
Won the interim ONE Women's Atomweight Kickboxing World Championship.
2023-10-06	Win	(Australia) Celest Hansen	ONE Fight Night 15	Bangkok, Thailand	TKO (Doctor stoppage/Cut)	3	1:01
2023-07-15	Win	(Spain) Lara Fernandez	ONE Fight Night 12	Bangkok, Thailand	TKO (Referee stop./Punches)	1	0:26
2023-05-12	Win	(France) Inès Pilutti	ONE Friday Fights 16, Lumpinee Stadium	Bangkok, Thailand	TKO (Ref.stop/Punches)	1	2:10
2023-03-17	Win	(Greece) Fani Peloumpi	ONE Friday Fights 9, Lumpinee Stadium	Bangkok, Thailand	TKO (punch to the body)	2	1:38
2021-12-19	Win	(Thailand) Rungnapa Por.Muengphet	THAI FIGHT Khao Aor, Queen’s Cup Flyweight tournament - Final	Phatthalung, Thailand	KO (Punches)	2	
Wins 2021 THAI FIGHT Queen's Cup -51kg title.
2021-07-04	Win	(France) Cindy Silvestre	THAI FIGHT Strong, Queen’s Cup Flyweight tournament - Semifinal	Pattaya, Thailand	KO (Punches)	2	
2021-04-03	Win	(Thailand) Aida Looksaikongdin	Thai Fight Nan	Nan province, Thailand	KO (Spinning back fist)	3	
2020-11-28	Win	(Brazil) Mariana Bernardes	Thai Fight Pluak Daeng	Rayong, Thailand	TKO (Elbows)	2	
2020-11-07	Win	(France) Morgane Manfredi	Thai Fight Korat 2020	Nakhon Ratchasima, Thailand	TKO (Doctor Stoppage)	2	3:00
2020-10-17	Win	(Brazil) Bárbara Aguiar	Thai Fight Begins	Nonthaburi, Thailand	Decision	3	3:00
2020-09-19	Win	(Australia) Celest Hansen	Thai Fight: New Normal	Bangkok, Thailand	TKO (Doctor Stoppage)	1	
2018-01-27	Win	(Estonia) Calista Parts	THAI FIGHT Bangkok 2017	Bangkok, Thailand	TKO (Punches)	1	
2017-11-22	Loss	(Japan) MIO	Shoot Boxing GROUND ZERO TOKYO 2017	Tokyo, Japan	Decision (Unanimous)	3	3:00
2017-	Win	(China)		China	Decision		
2017-09-08	Win	(Thailand) Hongkaw Wor Sayan	Samui Fight	Ko Samui, Thailand	Decision	5	2:00
2017-06-08	Win	(Sweden) Sandra Godvik	Women's Muay Thai World Championships 2017	Bangkok, Thailand	Decision	3	2:00
2017-04-01	Win	(Thailand) Phetnaree Chor.Phetchorajan	WPMF Muay Thai	Bangkok, Thailand	Decision	5	2:00
Wins WPMF World 105lbs title.
2016-07-30	Win	(Thailand) Penphet Sor.Thianchai	Women's Muay Thai World Championships 2016	Bangkok, Thailand	Decision	5	2:00
Wins WMC World -45kg title.
2016-07-09	Win	(Thailand) Rungnapa Por.Muangphet	PPTV Muay Thai Fight Night	Bangkok, Thailand	Decision	3	2:00
2016-06-04	Win	(Thailand) Augnkor Soonkelabampoo	PPTV Muay Thai Fight Night	Bangkok, Thailand	TKO	2	
2016-02-07	Loss	(Japan) Manazo Kobayashi	MuayThaiOpen 34	Tokyo, Japan	Decision (Majority)	5	2:00
2015-12-27	Win	(Thailand) Faa Chiangrai Sor.Sakonthom	Aswindum	Bangkok, Thailand	Decision	5	2:00
2015-08-31	Win	(Thailand)		Nakhon Ratchasima, Thailand	KO	3	
2015-08-12	Win	(Thailand) Phettae Or. Wanchert	Queen's Birthday	Bangkok, Thailand	Decision	5	2:00
2015-07-26	Win	(Thailand) Nongjoy Sor.Sommai	Aswindum	Bangkok, Thailand	Decision	5	2:00
2015-06-04	Win	(Thailand) Augnkor Soonkelabampoo	PPTV Muay Thai Fight Night	Bangkok, Thailand	KO (Knees)	2	
2015-	Win	(Thailand) Kutawan Sor.Sommai	Aswindum	Bangkok, Thailand	TKO (Referee Stoppage)	2	
2015-05-18	Win	(Thailand) Lookget Payalampong	Thepprasit Stadium	Pattaya, Thailand	TKO (Ref. Stoppage/Kicks)	4	
2015-02-15	Win	(Thailand) Buakaw Lokboonmee		Nakhon Ratchasima, Thailand	Decision	5	2:00
2014-11-18	Win	(Thailand) Dong-eh Lunjaaprayaa		Si Racha, Thailand	KO (Knee to the head)	2	
2014-11-06	Win	(Thailand) Nongbrai Gogiathuawaa		Prachinburi Province, Thailand	KO (Knees)	3	
2014-07-26	Win	(Thailand) Inseedam Poptheeratham		Bangkok, Thailand	Decision	5	2:00
PhetjeeJaa's last fight against a boy.
Legend: Win Loss Draw/No contest Notes
