= Allycia Rodrigues =

Brazilian Muay Thai fighter (born 1998)

- Born: Allycia Hellen Rodrigues; May 18, 1998 (age 28); Fortaleza, Brazil
- Other names: Allycia Hellen Araujo; Allycia Phuket
- Height: 5 ft 3 in (160 cm)
- Weight: 115 lb (52 kg; 8 st 3 lb)
- Division: Atomweight
- Reach: 62 in (157 cm)
- Style: Muay Thai, Kickboxing
- Fighting out of: Phuket, Thailand
- Team: Phuket Fight Club

Kickboxing record
- Total: 42
- Wins: 36
- Losses: 6
- By knockout: 1
- Draws: 0
- No contests: 0
- Last updated on: September 30, 2023

Allycia Hellen Rodrigues (born May 18, 1998) is a Brazilian Muay Thai fighter. She currently competes for ONE Championship, where she is the current ONE Atomweight Muay Thai World Champion. As of July 2025, she is ranked as the number one female super bantamweight Muay Thai contender in the world by the WBC Muaythai.

== Muay Thai career ==
=== ONE Championship ===
In her ONE Championship debut, Rodrigues was scheduled to face defending Atomweight Muay Thai champion Stamp Fairtex at ONE Championship: A New Breed on August 28, 2020, having been the Queens of the Ring Flyweight Tournament winner. After five rounds, Rodrigues won the bout by majority decision to win the title.

Rodrigues was scheduled to face interim champion Janet Todd in a ONE Women's Atomweight Muay Thai World Championship unification bout at ONE on Prime Video 5 on December 3, 2022. However, Todd withdrew from the fight on November 30, after testing positive for COVID-19. The pair was rescheduled on March 25, 2023, at ONE Fight Night 8. Rodrigues won the bout by unanimous decision to unify the titles.

Rodrigues challenged Smilla Sundell for the Women's Muay Thai Strawweight World Championship at ONE Fight Night 14 on September 29, 2023. She lost the fight by a third-round technical knockout.

Rodrigues faced Cristina Morales for the ONE Women's Atomweight Muay Thai World Championship on March 9, 2024, at ONE Fight Night 20. She defended the title by unanimous decision.

Rodrigues was scheduled to face Shir Cohen on March 8, 2025, at ONE Fight Night 29. However, Cohen withdrew due to injury and was replaced by promotional newcomer Marie McManamon. Rodrigues defended the title by a fourth-round technical knockout, earning her the Performance of the Night bonus award for the first time.

Rodrigues faced newcomer Johanna Persson on July 12, 2025, at ONE Fight Night 33. She defended the title by a third-round knockout, earning her the Performance of the Night bonus award once again.

Rodrigues was scheduled to face ONE Women's Atomweight Kickboxing World champion Phetjeeja Lukjaoporongtom on March 14, 2026, at ONE Fight Night 41. However, the bout was canceled after both fighters suffered an injury. The bout with Phetjeeja was rebooked on June 19, 2026, at ONE The Inner Circle 19. Rodrigues defended the title by split decision.

== Professional mixed arts career ==
Making her professional MMA debut, Rodrigues is scheduled to face Charlotte Padié on November 20, 2026, at ONE The Inner Circle 39.

== Personal life ==
Rodrigues has a son, who was born on September 27, 2021.

== Championships and accomplishments ==
Professional

- ONE Championship
  - ONE Women's Atomweight Muay Thai World Championship (One time; current)
    - Five successful title defenses
  - Performance of the Night (Two times) (vs. Marie McManamon and Johanna Persson)

== Muay Thai record ==
Muay Thai record
36 Wins, 6 Losses, 0 Draw, 0 No Contests
Date	Result	Opponent	Event	Location	Method	Round	Time
2026-06-19	Win	(Thailand) Phetjeeja Lukjaoporongtom	ONE The Inner Circle 19	Bangkok, Thailand	Decision (Split)	5	3:00
Defended the ONE Women's Atomweight Muay Thai World Championship.
2025-07-11	Win	(Sweden) Johanna Persson	ONE Fight Night 33	Bangkok, Thailand	KO (Left hook)	3	0:59
Defended the ONE Women's Atomweight Muay Thai World Championship.
2025-03-08	Win	(Republic of Ireland) Marie McManamon	ONE Fight Night 29	Bangkok, Thailand	TKO (doctor stoppage)	4	3:00
Defended the ONE Women's Atomweight Muay Thai World Championship.
2024-03-09	Win	(Spain) Cristina Morales	ONE Fight Night 20	Bangkok, Thailand	Decision (Unanimous)	5	3:00
Defended the ONE Women's Atomweight Muay Thai World Championship.
2023-09-29	Loss	(Sweden) Smilla Sundell	ONE Fight Night 14	Kallang, Singapore	TKO (punches and elbows)	3	2:58
For the ONE Women's Strawweight Muay Thai World Championship.
2023-03-25	Win	(United States) Janet Todd	ONE Fight Night 8	Kallang, Singapore	Decision (unanimous)	5	3:00
Defended and unified the ONE Women's Atomweight Muay Thai World Championship.
2020-09-27	Loss	(Thailand) Dangkongfah Sittongsak	Chang Muaythai Kiatpetch, Or.Tor.Gor.3 Stadium	Nonthaburi province, Thailand	Decision	5	2:00
For the vacant Thai Female Super Flyweight (115 lb) title and a one million baht side-bet.
2020-08-28	Win	(Thailand) Stamp Fairtex	ONE Championship: A New Breed	Bangkok, Thailand	Decision (Majority)	5	3:00
Won the ONE Women's Atomweight Muay Thai World Championship.
2020-01-04	Win	(Thailand) Thananchanok Kaewsamrit	Muay Hardcore	Bangkok, Thailand	Decision (Unanimous)	3	3:00
2019-11-16	Loss	(Thailand) Dangkongfah JaosurenoiMuaythai	Muay Hardcore	Bangkok, Thailand	Decision (Unanimous)	3	3:00
2019-09-	Win	(Thailand)	Patong Stadium	Patong, Thailand	KO		
2019-08-07	Loss	(Thailand) Thananchanok Kaewsamrit		Bangkok, Thailand	Decision	5	2:00
For the vacant Thai Female Flyweight (112 lb) title.
2019-07-21	Win	(Scotland) Rhona Walker	Bangla Boxing Stadium	Phuket, Thailand	Decision	5	2:00
Wins the Bangla Boxing Stadium title.
2019-03-17	Win	(Thailand) Thananchanok Kaewsamrit	Miracle Muay Thai Festival, Fnal	Ayutthaya, Thailand	Decision	3	2:00
2019-03-17	Win	(Thailand) Dangkongfah KiatphetnoiGym	Miracle Muay Thai Festival, Semi Fnal	Ayutthaya, Thailand	Decision	3	2:00
2018-08-30	Win	(Estonia) Calista Parts		Chumphon province, Thailand	Decision	5	2:00
2018-08-09	Loss	(Thailand) Nongbiew Thor Thepsutin	Queen's Birthday	Bangkok, Thailand	Decision	5	3:00
For the WPMF World 115 lbs title.
2017-10-28	Win	(Brazil) Thainara Torres	Super Girls, Portuarios Stadium	Itanhaém, Brazil	Decision		
2017-02-	Win	(Brazil) Bruna Menegatti	Super Girls, Portuarios Stadium	Itanhaém, Brazil	TKO (Doctor stoppage)	4	
2016-05-01	Win	(Brazil) Ana Valente	Sip Sam Dek, Final	Brazil	Decision	3	3:00
2016-05-01	Win	(Brazil) Laryssa Nayra	Sip Sam Dek, Semi-final	Brazil	KO (Knees to the body)	3	
Legend: Win Loss Draw/No contest Notes

== See also ==
- List of current ONE fighters
