= Janet Todd (kickboxer) =

American Muay Thai kickboxer

- Born: December 12, 1985 (age 40); Hermosa Beach, California, United States
- Other names: JT
- Height: 5 ft 3 in (160 cm)
- Weight: 113 lb (51 kg; 8 st 1 lb)
- Division: Atomweight; Strawweight
- Reach: 68 in (173 cm)
- Style: Muay Thai, Kickboxing
- Stance: Orthodox
- Fighting out of: California
- Team: Boxing Works
- Years active: 2009–2024

Kickboxing record
- Total: 52
- Wins: 39
- By knockout: 8
- Losses: 13
- By knockout: 0
- Last updated on: 28 February 2020

Janet Todd (born December 12, 1985), nicknamed "JT", is an American retired Muay Thai kickboxer. She is a two-time Pan-American Muay Thai Champion. Formerly, she competed for ONE Championship and is the former ONE Kickboxing Atomweight World Champion.

As of January 2022, she is ranked as the ninth best pound for pound female kickboxer in the world by Combat Press.

== Background ==
Todd was born in Hermosa Beach, California. Although born in the United States, her first spoken language was Japanese, taught by her mother. She is a hapa with a Japanese mother and White American father. In her youth, Todd trained and competed in gymnastics, but later gave up the pursuit due to wanting a balance with her personal life.

Todd attended California Polytechnic State University in San Luis Obispo and completed a five-year master's program in aerospace engineering.

After beginning kickboxing classes, Todd's then boyfriend, now husband, introduced her to a Muay Thai gym.

== Muay Thai career ==
Todd first competed as an amateur in 2009. She won the bout by TKO but did not return to competition until 2013.

In 2017, Todd captured the bronze medal at the IFMA World Championships and World Games, subsequently winning an IFMA Pan-American Championship. She later won gold at the 2017 IFMA Pan American Championships at 51 kg.

=== ONE Championship ===
On February 22, 2019, Todd joined ONE Championship to compete for the ONE Atomweight Muay Thai world title against Stamp Fairtex. She lost by unanimous decision.

She returned to ONE Championship on May 10, 2019, under kickboxing rules, defeating Wang Chin Long by TKO in the second round.

On July 12, 2019, in another kickboxing match, Todd defeated Chuang Kai Ting by majority decision at ONE Championship: Masters of Destiny.

On October 13, 2019, fighting under Muay Thai rules, she defeated Ekaterina Vandaryeva by second-round knockout at ONE Championship: Century.

==== ONE Kickboxing Atomweight champion ====
She faced Stamp Fairtex a second time, fighting for the ONE Women's Atomweight Kickboxing World Championship, at ONE: King of the Jungle on February 28, 2020, winning by split decision.

Todd faced former ONE Atomweight Muay Thai title challenger Alma Juniku in a non-title Muay Thai match at ONE: Fists Of Fury 3 on March 19, 2021. She defeated Juniku by unanimous decision, scoring a knockdown in the second round.

Todd faced Anne Line Hogstad at ONE on TNT 2 on April 14, 2021. She won via a body kick that dropped Hogstad in the third round.

Todd faced promotional newcomer Lara Fernandez for the interim ONE Women's Atomweight Muay Thai World Championship at ONE 159 on July 22, 2022. She won the fight by unanimous decision.

Todd was scheduled to face Allycia Rodrigues in a ONE Women's Atomweight Muay Thai World Championship unification bout at ONE on Prime Video 5 on December 3, 2022. She withdrew from the fight on November 30, after testing positive for COVID-19. The pair was rescheduled on March 25, 2023, at ONE Fight Night 8. She lost the bout via unanimous decision.

Todd faced the interim champion Phetjeeja Lukjaoporongtom for the ONE Women's Atomweight Kickboxing World Championship unification bout on March 9, 2024, at ONE Fight Night 19. She lost the fight by unanimous decision and announced her retirement during the post-fight interview.

== Championships and accomplishments ==
Professional

- ONE Championship
  - ONE Women's Atomweight Kickboxing World Championship (One time; former)
  - Interim ONE Women's Atomweight Muay Thai World Championship (One time)
  - ONE Super Series Female Fighter of the Year 2021
  - Most wins in the ONE Women's Super Series (7)

Amateur

- International Federation of Muaythai Associations
  - 2017 IFMA World Championships -51 kg (bronze)
  - 2017 IFMA Pan-American Championships -51 kg (gold)
  - 2016 IFMA Pan-American Championships (bronze)
- World Games
  - 2017 World Games Muay Thai -51 kg (bronze)
- US Muay Thai Open
  - 2017 USMTO 112 lbs Tournament Champion
- Thai Boxing Association-Sanctioning Authority
  - 2016 TBA-SA Muay Thai Classic A-Class 112 lbs Champion
- International Amateur Muay Thai Federation
  - 2015 IAMTF Amateur 115 lbs Champion
  - 2014 IAMTF California Amateur Super Flyweight Champion
- Muay Thai Association of America
  - 2015 MTAA Amateur 115 lbs Champion
- United States Muay Thai Association
  - 2013 USMTA Amateur 120 lbs Champion

== Muay Thai & Kickboxing record ==
Professional Muay Thai record
39 Wins (8 (T)KO's), 13 Losses.
Date	Result	Opponent	Event	Location	Method	Round	Time
2024-03-09	Loss	(Thailand) Phetjeeja Lukjaoporongtom	ONE Fight Night 20	Bangkok, Thailand	Decision (Unanimous)	5	3:00
Loses the ONE Women's Atomweight Kickboxing World Championship.
2023-03-25	Loss	(Brazil) Allycia Rodrigues	ONE Fight Night 8	Kallang, Singapore	Decision (Unanimous)	5	3:00
Loses the ONE Women's Atomweight Muay Thai World Championship.
2022-07-22	Win	(Spain) Lara Fernandez	ONE 159: De Ridder vs. Bigdash	Kallang, Singapore	Decision (Unanimous)	5	3:00
Wins the interim ONE Women's Atomweight Muay Thai World Championship.
2021-04-14	Win	(Norway) Anne Line Hogstad	ONE on TNT 2	Kallang, Singapore	TKO (Body kick)	3	1:36
2021-03-19	Win	(Australia) Alma Juniku	ONE Championship: Fists Of Fury 3	Kallang, Singapore	Decision (Unanimous)	3	3:00
2020-02-28	Win	(Thailand) Stamp Fairtex	ONE Championship: King of the Jungle	Kallang, Singapore	Decision (Split)	5	3:00
Wins the ONE Women's Atomweight Kickboxing World Championship.
2019-10-13	Win	(Belarus) Ekaterina Vandaryeva	ONE Championship: Century	Tokyo, Japan	KO (Head kick)	2	2:20
2019-07-12	Win	(Taiwan) Kai Ting Chuang	ONE Championship: Masters of Destiny	Kuala Lumpur, Malaysia	Decision (Majority)	3	3:00
2019-05-10	Win	(Taiwan) Wang Chin Long	ONE Championship: Warriors of Light	Bangkok, Thailand	TKO (3 Knockdown Rule)	2	2:59
2019-02-22	Loss	(Thailand) Stamp Fairtex	ONE Championship: Call to Greatness	Kallang, Singapore	Decision (Unanimous)	5	3:00
For the ONE Atomweight Muay Thai World Title
2018-02-25	Loss	(Japan) Yumiko Kawano	Triumphant 3	Oakland, California	Decision (Split)	3	3:00
Legend: Win Loss Draw/No contest Notes

Amateur Muay Thai record
Date	Result	Opponent	Event	Location	Method	Round	Time
2018-05-15	Loss	(Sweden) Josefine Lindgren Knutsson	2018 IFMA World Championships, Quarter Finals	Cancun, Mexico	Decision (30:27)	3	2:00
2017-11-05	Win	(United States) Anne Lieberman	US Muay Thai Open East, Tournament Final	New York, United States	Decision	3	3:00
Wins 2017 USMTO -50kg Gold Medal.
2017-11-04	Win	(United States) Mary Brulatour	US Muay Thai Open East, Tournament Semifinal	New York, United States	Decision	3	3:00
2017-11-04	Win	(United States) Yasmeen Salhani	US Muay Thai Open East, Tournament Quarterfinal	New York, United States	Decision	3	3:00
2017-10-07	Win	(Mexico) Valeria Ramirez Sanchez	IFMA Pan American Championships, Tournament Final	Buenos Aires, Argentina	Decision	3	3:00
Wins 2017 IFMA Pan-Am -51kg Gold Medal.
2017-10-07	Win	(Mexico) Paula Luna	IFMA Pan American Championships, Tournament Semifinal	Buenos Aires, Argentina	Decision	3	3:00
2017-07-30	Win	(Poland) Gabriela Kuzawińska	2017 World Games, Bronze Medal Fight	Wroclaw, Poland	TKO	3	
Wins 2017 World Games Muay Thai -51kg Bronze Medal.
2017-07-29	Loss	(Thailand) Apasara Koson	2017 World Games, Semi Finals	Wroclaw, Poland	Decision (30:27)	3	2:00
2017-07-28	Win	(Morocco) Meriem El Moubarik	2017 World Games, Quarter Finals	Wroclaw, Poland	Decision (29:28)	3	2:00
2017-05-27	Win	(United States) Kennedy Maze	WBC Muay Thai Tournament, Tournament Final	Tacoma, Washington, United States	TKO	2	
Wins 2017 WBC Muay Thai Amateur -51kg Gold Medal.
2017-05-27	Win	(United States) Chelsea Elexis Van	WBC Muay Thai Tournament, Tournament Semifinal	Tacoma, Washington, United States	Decision	3	3:00
2017-05-07	Loss	(Morocco) Meriem El Moubarik	2017 IFMA World Championships, Semi Finals	Minsk, Belarus	Decision (30:27)	3	2:00
Wins 2017 IFMA World Championships -51kg Bronze Medal.
2017-05-06	Win	(Russia) Ekaterina Gurina	2017 IFMA World Championships, Quarter Finals	Minsk, Belarus	Decision (30:27)	3	2:00
2017-03-11	Loss	(Japan) Yumiko Kawano	SHEfights: Be Bold for Change	Ontario, Canada	Decision (Unanimous)	3	2:00
2016-12-03	Win	(Argentina) Marlene de la Cuadra	2016 IFMA Pan-Am Championships, Bronze medal match	Lima, Peru	Decision	3	2:00
Wins 2016 IFMA Pan-Am -51kg Bronze Medal.
2016-12-01	Loss	(Peru) Tristana Tola	2016 IFMA Pan-Am Championships, Tournament Semifinal	Lima, Peru	Decision	3	2:00
2016-10-21	Win	(United States) Susan Wallace	Lion Fight 32: Sasiprapa vs Nattawut	Las Vegas, Nevada, United States	Decision (Unanimous)	3	2:00
2016-09-02	Win	(Mexico) Valeria Ramirez Sanchez	Siam Fight Productions	Phoenix, Arizona, United States	TKO	3	
2016-06-19	Win	(Canada) Deepy Sidhu	TBA-SA Muay Thai Classic	Des Moines, Iowa, United States	Decision	3	3:00
Wins TBA-SA A-Class -50kg title.
2016-05-21	Win	(United States) Thai-Ngan Le	IFS	Anaheim, California, United States	Decision	3	3:00
Wins the IFS -51kg title.
2016-04-24	Win	(United States) Angela Bahr	US Muay Thai Open, Tournament Final	Phoenix, Arizona, United States	Decision	3	3:00
Wins 2016 USMTO -50kg Gold Medal.
2016-04-23	Win	(Japan) Yuko Shimoda	US Muay Thai Open, Tournament Semifinal	Phoenix, Arizona, United States	Decision	3	3:00
2015-12-12	Win	(United States) Victoria Engberson	MTAA	Los Angeles, California, United States	TKO	4	
Wins the MTAA -51kg title.
2015-10-24	Win	(United States) Krystal Khorge	WCK Muay Thai: Cali 11 Bad to the Bone	Inglewood, California, United States	Decision (Unanimous)	5	3:00
Defends the IAMTF -51kg title.
2015-08-	Loss	(Australia) Kristan Armstrong	2015 IFMA Royal World Cup, Quarter Finals	Bangkok, Thailand	Decision	3	2:00
2015-08-	Win	(Italy) Barbara Bontempi	2015 IFMA Royal World Cup, Round of 16	Bangkok, Thailand	Decision	3	2:00
2015-05-16	Win	(United States) Sheila Adamos	Cali 8	Inglewood, California, United States	Decision (Unanimous)	5	3:00
Defends the IAMTF -51kg title.
2015-03-07	Loss	(United States) Natalie Morgan	IFS 17	La Puente, California, United States	Decision (Split)	3	2:00
For the IFS -51kg title.
2014-08-16	Win	(United States) Marie Choi	Cali 5	Inglewood, California, United States	Decision (Unanimous)	4	
Wins the IAMTF -51kg title.
2014-04-19	Loss	(United States) Ariana Gomez	Cali 4	Inglewood, California, United States	Decision (Unanimous)	3	
2014-03-28	Win	(United States) Renee Rosas	Lion Fight 14	Las Vegas, Nevada, United States	Decision (Split)	3	
2013-12-?	Loss	(United States) Natalie Morgan	WCK Cali Three	Los Angeles, California, United States	Decision (Unanimous)	3	2:00
2013-10-19	Win	(United States) Renee Rosas	Muay Thai Ultimate II	California, United States	Points	5	2:00
Wins the USMTA Amateur 120 lbs title.
2009-07-18	Win	(United States) Victoria Beltran		Anaheim, California, United States	TKO	2	
Legend: Win Loss Draw/No contest Notes

== See also ==
- List of current ONE fighters
