= Lara Fernandez =

Spanish kickboxer

- Born: 1996 (age 29–30); Toledo, Spain
- Nickname: "Sekmeth", "Pizza Power"
- Height: 1.65 m (5 ft 5 in)
- Weight: 54 kg (119 lb; 8 st 7 lb)
- Division: Flyweight; Bantamweight; Featherweight
- Style: Kickboxing; Muay thai
- Stance: Orthodox
- Fighting out of: Coria del Rio, Spain
- Team: Lone Wolf Fight Team
- Trainer: Jaime Cantos

Kickboxing record
- Total: 65
- Wins: 43
- Losses: 19
- Draws: 3

Lara Fernandez (born 1996) is a Spanish Muay Thai kickboxer. She is the reigning WBC Muaythai World Flyweight Champion and the reigning ISKA World Super Featherweight champion.

== Biography ==
=== Early career ===
Fernadez began training in kickboxing when she was 14. She is a supporter of Real Betis, and she credits the club with helping raise her popularity.

Fernandez faced Saskia D'Effremo for the vacant ISKA World Super Featherweight (−56.4 kg) championship at Fight Night III on 5 November 2016. She lost the fight by unanimous decision.

Fernandez faced Gloria Peritore at War of Titans on 23 September 2017. She lost the fight by unanimous decision.

Fernandez faced Maribel de Sousa at Masters Series V on 11 November 2017. She won the fight by unanimous decision.

At Enfusion 68, held on 9 June 2018, Fernandez challenged Iman Barlow for the Enfusion 54 kg title. Fernandez lost the fight by a unanimous decision. During Enfusion 72, held on 6 October 2018, she lost a unanimous decision against Lizzie Largillière, despite rallying in the last two rounds.

Fernandez faced Maite Botella for the FEKM Spanish (−53 kg) Championship at Xtreme Fight Show on 23 June 2018. She won the fight by unanimous decision.

Fernandez was booked to face Lilit Dallakyan at Mix Fight 42 on 17 July 2019. She won the fight by a unanimous decision.

Fernandez won the vacant ISKA World K-1 Rules Super Featherweight title on 30 November 2019, with a unanimous decision win over Kelly Denoiko.

At WLF World Cup 2019-2020 Final, held on 11 January 2020, she faced Li Mingrui. She won the fight by a unanimous decision.

Fernandez faced Grace Spicer for the vacant WBC Muaythai World Flyweight title at Combat Fight Series 4 on 9 March 2020. Fernandez won the fight by a closely contested unanimous decision after five rounds.

Fernandez was scheduled to fight Amy Pirnie for the Lion Fight super-flyweight Championship at Lion Fight 68 on 22 August 2021. She lost the fight by split decision.

15 February 2025, Barcelona, Spain – Noche de Leyendas took place at the Olympic Arena in Barcelona, where Lara Fernández defeated Giuliana Cosnard of Argentina by unanimous decision to capture the ISKA Women's Intercontinental Super-flyweight (53.5 kg) Muay Thai title.

=== ONE Championship ===
On 4 May 2022 it was announced that Fernandez signed with ONE Championship.

Fernandez made her promotional debut against the ONE Women's Atomweight Kickboxing World champion Janet Todd for the interim ONE Women's Atomweight Muay Thai World Championship on 22 July 2022 at ONE 159. She lost the fight by unanimous decision.

Fernandez faced Dangkongfah Banchamek on 3 December 2022 at ONE 164. She won the bout via split decision.

Fernandez faced Supergirl Jaroonsak on 5 August 2023 at ONE Fight Night 13, losing the bout via unanimous decision.

Fernandez faced Yu Yau Pui on 9 March 2024 at ONE Fight Night 20. At weigh-ins, Pui failed hydration, with their bout negotiationed at a catchweight of 118.5 lbs. She lost the fight by unanimous decision.

Fernandez challenged SAHO for the K-1 Women's Flyweight Championship at K-1 Dontaku on July 13, 2025. She lost the fight by unanimous decision.

== Championships and accomplishments ==
=== Amateur ===
- International Federation of Muaythai Associations
  - 2021 IFMA World Championships -54 kg (bronze)
  - 2022 IFMA European Championships -54 kg (bronze)

=== Professional ===
- World Boxing Council Muaythai
  - WBC Muaythai World Flyweight (−52 kg) Championship
- International Sport Kickboxing Association
  - 2019 ISKA Oriental rules World Super Featherweight (−59 kg) K-1 Championship
  - 2025 ISKA Intercontinental Super-flyweight (53.5 kg) Muay Thai Championship

=== Awards ===
- Combat Press
  - 2020 "Female Fighter of the Year" nominee

== Fight record ==
Professional Muay Thai & Kickboxing record
43 wins, 19 losses, 3 draw
Date	Result	Opponent	Event	Location	Method	Round	Time
2026-12-05		(Italy) Anna Lia Moretti	Elite Boxing - Road to RWS	Elmas, Italy			
2026-06-13	Win	(Republic of Ireland) Emma Usher	8IGHT Strikes	London, England	Decision (unanimous)	5	3:00
2026-05-09	Loss	(Portugal) Débora Évora	MFC Showdown 052	Ponferrada, Spain	Decision (unanimous)	3	3:00
2025-07-13	Loss	(Japan) ☆SAHO☆	K-1 Dontaku	Fukuoka, Japan	Decision (unanimous)	3	3:00
For the K-1 Women's Flyweight (-52 kg) Championship.
2025-02-15	Win	(Argentina) Giuliana Cosnard	Noche De Leyendas	Badalona, Spain	Decision (unanimous)	5	2:00
Wins the ISKA Intercontinental Super-flyweight (53.5 kg) Muay Thai Championship.
2024-03-09	Loss	(Hong Kong) Yu Yau Pui	ONE Fight Night 20	Bangkok, Thailand	Decision (unanimous)	3	3:00
2023-08-05	Loss	(Thailand) Supergirl Jaroonsak	ONE Fight Night 13	Bangkok, Thailand	Decision (unanimous)	3	3:00
2023-07-15	Loss	(Thailand) Phetjeeja Lukjaoporongtom	ONE Fight Night 12	Bangkok, Thailand	TKO (referee stoppage/Punches)	1	0:26
2022-12-03	Win	(Thailand) Dangkongfah Banchamek	ONE 164: Pacio vs. Brooks	Pasay, Philippines	Decision (split)	3	3:00
2022-07-22	Loss	(United States) Janet Todd	ONE 159: De Ridder vs. Bigdash	Kallang, Singapore	Decision (unanimous)	5	3:00
For the interim ONE Women's Atomweight Muay Thai World Championship.
2021-08-22	Loss	(Scotland) Amy Pirnie	Lion Fight 68	Glasgow, Scotland	Decision (split)	5	3:00
For the Lion Fight Super Flyweight Championship .
2020-10-31	Win	(Spain) Damaris Olivares	SLAM Arena 4	Las Palmas de Gran Canaria, Spain	Decision (unanimous)	5	3:00
2020-03-09	Win	(England) Grace Spicer	Combat Fight Series 4	London, England	Decision (unanimous)	5	2:00
Wins the vacant WBC Muaythai World Flyweight (112 lbs) Championship .
2020-01-11	Win	(China) Li Mingrui	WLF World Cup 2019-2020 Final	Zhuhai, China	Decision (unanimous)	3	3:00
2019-11-30	Win	(Belgium) Kelly Danioko	K-1 ISKA	Brussels, Belgium	Decision (unanimous)	5	2:00
Wins the ISKA World Oriental rules Super Featherweight (−59 kg) Championship .
2019-07-17	Win	(Armenia) Lilit Dallakyan	Mix Fight 42	Yerevan, Armenia	Decision (unanimous)	5	2:00
2018-06-23	Win	(Spain) Maite Botella	Xtreme Fight Show	Mérida, Spain	Decision (unanimous)	5	3:00
Wins the FEKM Spanish (−53 kg) Championship .
2018-10-06	Loss	(France) Lizzie Largillière	Enfusion 72	Madrid, Spain	Decision (unanimous)	5	2:00
2018-06-09	Loss	(England) Iman Barlow	Enfusion 68	Newcastle, England	Decision (unanimous)	5	2:00
For the Enfusion 54 kg Championship .
2017-11-11	Win	(Spain) Maribel de Sousa	Masters Series V	Bilbao, Spain	Decision (unanimous)	5	3:00
2017-09-23	Loss	(Italy) Gloria Peritore	War Of Titans	Barcelona, Spain	Decision (unanimous)	5	3:00
2017-03-04	Loss	(Portugal) Rita Carvalho	Kryssing World Serie	Seville, Spain	Decision (unanimous)	5	3:00
2016-11-05	Loss	(Germany) Saskia D'Effremo	Fight Night III	Singen, Germany	Decision (unanimous)	5	3:00
For the vacant ISKA World Super Featherweight (−56.4 kg) Title.
2015-11-06	Loss	(Spain) Estela García	HGH Promotions	Alhaurín de la Torre, Spain	Decision (unanimous)	5	3:00
2011-11-16	Loss	(England) Sophie Hawkswell	HGH Promotions	Leeds, England	Decision (unanimous)	5	3:00
Legend: Win Loss Draw/No contest Notes

Amateur Muay Thai & Kickboxing record
Date	Result	Opponent	Event	Location	Method	Round	Time
2022-02-18	Loss	(Russia) Victoria Kuvikina	2022 IFMA European Championship, Semi Final	Bangkok, Thailand	Decision (30:27)	3	3:00
Wins 2022 IFMA European Championship -54kg Bronze Medal.
2021-12-10	Loss	(Italy) Sveva Melillo	2021 IFMA World Championship, Semi Final	Bangkok, Thailand	Decision (29:28)	3	3:00
Wins 2021 IFMA World Championship -54kg Bronze Medal.
2021-12-09	Win	(Poland) Gabriela Kuzawinska	2021 IFMA World Championship, Quarter Final	Bangkok, Thailand	Decision (30:27)	3	3:00
2021-12-08	Win	(Belarus) Valeryia Novikava	2021 IFMA World Championship, Round of 16	Bangkok, Thailand	Decision (30:24)	3	3:00
2016-03-09	Win	(United Kingdom) Natasha Hingley	The Prodigy	Birmingham, England	Decision (Unanimous)	3	3:00
2015-12-06	Loss	(United Kingdom) Tamara Fallon	Rising Up 5	Manchester, England	Decision (Unanimous)	3	3:00
2014-11-08	Loss	(England) Lubena Jane Iske	Muaythai Mayhem	England			
Legend: Win Loss Draw/No contest Notes

== See also ==
List of female kickboxers
