= ONE Fight Night 20 =

Combat sport events in 2024

ONE Fight Night 20: Todd vs. Phetjeeja
- The poster for ONE Fight Night 20: Todd vs. Phetjeeja
- Promotion: ONE Championship
- Date: March 9, 2024
- Venue: Lumpinee Boxing Stadium
- City: Bangkok, Thailand

Event chronology
ONE Friday Fights 54: Ortikov vs. Watcharapon	ONE Fight Night 20: Todd vs. Phetjeeja	ONE Friday Fights 55: Avatar vs. Nabati

ONE Fight Night 20: Todd vs. Phetjeeja was a combat sport event produced by ONE Championship that took place on March 9, 2024, at Lumpinee Boxing Stadium in Bangkok, Thailand.

== Background ==
This event featured an all-female event on fight card in celebrated of International Women's Day. This also the second all-female event fight card of this organization since ONE: Empower in September 2021.

A ONE Women's Atomweight Kickboxing World Championship unification bout between current champion (also former interim ONE Women's Atomweight Muay Thai Champion) Janet Todd and interim champion Phetjeeja Lukjaoporongtom headlined the event.

A ONE Women's Atomweight Muay Thai World Championship bout between current champion Allycia Rodrigues and Cristina Morales served as the co-main event.

Multiple-time IBJJF World Champion Mayssa Bastos made her promotional debut against Kanae Yamada took place at the event.

At weigh-ins, Jihin Radzuan missed weight coming in at 120 lbs and failed hydration, while her opponent Chihiro Sawada failed hydration. Their bout was negotiated to continue at a catchweight. Yu Yau Pui also missed hydration, with the bout continuing at a catchweight of 118.5 lbs.

== Results ==
Fight card (Amazon Prime Video)
Weight class				Method	Round	Time	Notes
Atomweight Kickboxing	Phetjeeja Lukjaoporongtom (ic)	def.	Janet Todd (c)	Decision (unanimous)	5	3:00	(Note: For the ONE Women's Atomweight Kickboxing World Championship.)
Atomweight Muay Thai	Allycia Rodrigues (c)	def.	Cristina Morales	Decision (unanimous)	5	3:00	(Note: For the ONE Women's Atomweight Muay Thai World Championship.)
Catchweight (130 lb) Muay Thai	Jackie Buntan	def.	Martine Michieletto	Decision (unanimous)	3	3:00
Catchweight (120 lb)	Chihiro Sawada	def.	Jihin Radzuan	Decision (unanimous)	3	5:00	(Note: Radzuan (120 lbs) missed weight and Sawada failed hydration; bout negotiated at catchweight)
Strawweight Muay Thai	Ekaterina Vandaryeva	def.	Martyna Kierczyńska	Decision (unanimous)	3	3:00
Catchweight (118.5 lb) Muay Thai	Yu Yau Pui	def.	Lara Fernandez	Decision (unanimous)	3	3:00	(Note: Yu failed hydration; bout negotiated at catchweight (118.5 lb).)
Atomweight	Noelle Grandjean	def.	Victória Souza	Decision (unanimous)	3	5:00
Atomweight Submission Grappling	Mayssa Bastos	def.	Kanae Yamada	Decision (unanimous)	1	10:00
Atomweight Muay Thai	Shir Cohen	def.	Teodora Kirilova	TKO (punches)	2	2:27

== See also ==
- 2024 in ONE Championship
- List of ONE Championship events
- List of current ONE fighters
- ONE Championship Rankings
