= Love Alert (Thai TV series) =

2025–26 Thai television series

- Also known as: Mi Kham Tuean Prot Ramatrawang
- มีคำเตือน โปรดระมัดระวัง
- Genre: Boys' love, Drama
- Created by: Nottakorn
- Based on: มีคำเตือน โปรดระมัดระวัง
- Written by: Bhumjai
- Directed by: Bum Pariyakon Chayaninparamet
- Country of origin: Thailand
- Original language: Thai
- No. of episodes: 10

Production
- Running time: 45 min

Original release
- Network: Channel 8 Viu
- Release: 28 December 2025 – 1 March 2026

Love Alert (Mi Kham Tuean Prot Ramatrawang) is a Thai BL television series broadcast on Channel 8 and distributed on Viu, based on the novel of the same name originally published in digital format. The series premiered on 28 December 2025 and concluded on 1 March 2026, airing weekly on Sundays. Internationally, it was also distributed on GagaOOLala.

== Synopsis ==
Jimmy, a carefree playboy, decides to walk Teh home in hopes of getting closer to his crush, Plaifah. Instead, he unexpectedly meets Teh's older brother, Toh, whose gentle and enigmatic personality awakens feelings Jimmy never anticipated.

== Cast and characters ==
=== Main ===
- James Hayward Prescott as Jimmy
- Kad Ploysupa as Toh
- Thanuphat Poungsuwan (Fam) as Plaifah
- David Matthew Roberts as Teh

=== Supporting ===
- Jiramate Srinonghang (Dew) as Run
- Anakin Nontiprasit (Kin) as Freeze
- Thanatad Darawichai (Ryu)
- Norravit Songtrai

== Reception ==
On MyDramaList, the series received a rating of 7.4/10 from 267 users. Thai media widely reported on the premiere and its placement in Channel 8's Sunday schedule. Naewna highlighted the audience's anticipation and programming strategy, while MGR Online emphasized the promotional campaign targeting younger viewers and the series’ digital presence. Thairath noted the positive reception and the chemistry between the leads, and TrueID published several articles highlighting the cast and audience response. The People featured a fitting session with the cast, emphasizing their on-screen chemistry.

== Promotion ==
The official trailer was released on 17 December 2025 on the Thai CH8 YouTube channel, with coverage in portals such as Naewna.
