= Bangla Boxing Stadium =

Muay Thai stadium and fight promoter in Phuket, Thailand

- Interactive map of Bangla Boxing Stadium
- Address: 155 155/1 Phangmuang Sai Kor Road, Pa Tong, Kathu District, Phuket 83150; Phuket; Thailand
- Coordinates: 7°53′20.0″N 98°17′40.0″E
- Operator: Yokkao
- Type: Muay Thai stadium
- Event: Muaythai

Website
- muaythaiallinone.com

Bangla Boxing Stadium (Thai: สนามมวยบางลา) is a Muay Thai venue located in Patong Beach, Phuket, Thailand. The stadium hosts both local and international Muay Thai events several nights a week, featuring fighters from around the world. Bangla Stadium is one of the most well-known fight arenas in Thailand and the most famous stadium in Phuket.

== History ==
Bangla Boxing Stadium was established to meet the rising demand for combat sports entertainment among tourists visiting Phuket. Strategically located in the heart of Patong, the stadium quickly became a nightlife attraction and a showcase venue for both traditional and modern Muay Thai bouts. In recent years, it has been managed in collaboration with Yokkao. The stadium has served as a launchpad for both local Thai fighters and foreign practitioners training in Thailand.

In response to capacity needs, Bangla Boxing Stadium was relocated from its original site on Bangla Road in Patong Beach to a larger venue behind Jungceylon Shopping Center, directly opposite Banzaan Fresh Market on Sai Kor Road. The new location offers improved infrastructure and expanded seating, while retaining the stadium's original "Bangla" name. Bangla Boxing Stadium typically hosts fights 3 to 4 nights a week.

== In popular culture ==
In early 2025, Bangla Boxing Stadium received international attention when it was featured in Season 3 of HBO's acclaimed series The White Lotus. A pivotal Muay Thai fight scene was filmed at the stadium, with characters portrayed by Lalisa Manobal and Tayme Thapthimthong.

== Controversies ==
In May 2023, Bangla Boxing Stadium drew international headlines after a controversial fight decision triggered a mass brawl involving fighters and team members inside the ring. Multiple fighters and cornermen were seen exchanging punches post-decision. The incident was captured on video and widely circulated across Thai and foreign media, including coverage in Russian-language press. The fighters later made peace publicly.

== Notable competitors ==
- (Thailand) Saenchai
- (Thailand) Jomhod Kiatadisak
- (Morocco) Youssef Boughanem
- (Canada) Dave Leduc
- (Brazil) Carlos Prates
- (Uzbekistan) Anvar Boynazarov
- (Azerbaijan) Rafael Fiziev
- (France) Rafi Bohic
- (France) Raphaël Llodra
- (Thailand) Berneung TopkingBoxing
- (Thailand) Pungluang Sor Singyu
- (Thailand) Medgoen Singsurat
- (New Zealand) Brad Riddell
- (Lithuania) Sergej Maslobojev
- (Bulgaria) Dakota Ditcheva
- (Argentina) Federico Roma
- (Canada) Julia Budd
- (United States) Cyrus Washington
- (Brazil) Allycia Rodrigues
- (Spain) Antonio Orden
- (Brazil) Walter Goncalves
- (China) Yang Ming
- (France) Damien Alamos
- (South Korea) Lim Su-jeong
- (Iran) Mohammad Ghaedi
- (Turkey) Atakan Arslan
- (Sweden) Smilla Sundell
- (Thailand) Dangkongfah KhunPon Martial Arts
- (Kyrgyzstan) Valentina Shevchenko
- (Brazil) Julio Lobo
- (Uzbekistan) Naimjon Tuhtaboyev
- (United States) Justine Kish
- (Italy) Chantal Ughi
- (Thailand) Singmanee Kaewsamrit
- (Sweden) Lina Länsberg
- (Iran) Fariyar Aminipour

== See also ==
- Lumpinee Stadium
- Rajadamnern Stadium
- Thai Fight
- Max Muay Thai
