= Channel 8 (Thailand) =

- Logo used since 2026
- Country: Thailand
- Broadcast area: Thailand; Malaysia (Perlis, Kedah, Perak, Kelantan and Terengganu); Myanmar (areas of Tachileik, Myawaddy, parts of Mawlamyine, and southernmost part of Tanintharyi Region); Cambodia (border areas of Oddar Meanchey, Banteay Meanchey, Pailin, parts of Battambang and Koh Kong provinces); Mekong river areas in Laos (including Vientiane)
- Headquarters: RS Group Building, Chatuchak, Bangkok, Thailand

Programming
- Language: Thai
- Picture format: 576i SDTV

Ownership
- Owner: RS Public Company Limited (RS Multimedia Company Limited)
- Sister channels: Channel 2

History
- Launched: Satellite system: 5 January 2011; 15 years ago Terrestrial digital: 25 April 2014; 12 years ago Satellite and digital: 2 December 2015; 10 years ago

Links
- Website: www.thaich8.com

Availability

Terrestrial
- Digital: Channel 27 (TPBS MUX4)

Streaming media
- Channel 8: Watch live (Thailand only)

Channel 8 (ช่อง 8) is a Thai digital television channel that broadcasts entertainment, foreign TV series, and sports. It is owned and operated by RS Multimedia Company Limited (through RS Vision Company Limited, a subsidiary of RS Group). The channel is based in Bangkok, Thailand, where it is available on both C and KU bands. Channel 8 broadcasts popular events such as HBO World Championship Boxing plus domestic and self-produced programs.

== History ==
Channel 8 began broadcasting on a satellite platform in December 2010. It officially launched as a 24-hour free-to-air television channel on 5 January 2011. On 17 August 2013, Channel 8 upgraded its production and broadcast equipment to high-definition. Its HD stream was broadcast on the Thaicom 6 satellite. In December 2013, RS won a license to broadcast Channel 8 on the digital terrestrial television platform in the Variety SD category. Channel 8 officially launched its digital TV channel on 25 April 2014.

== Programming ==
Channel 8 airs both Thai and foreign dramas, including Korean series and self-produced Thai dramas. Its flagship sports content is boxing. In addition to airing boxing programs from HBO and UFC, Channel 8 produces its own boxing programs.

=== Notable series ===
- The Doctors (2016)
- Uncontrollably Fond (2016)
- Love in the Moonlight (2016)
- Sankatmochan Mahabali Hanuman (2017–18)
- Eternal Love of Dream (2020)
- The Romance of Tiger and Rose (2020)
- The Love by Hypnotic (2019)
- The Eternal Love 2 (2018)
- Put Your Head on My Shoulder (2019)
- The Chang'an Youth (2020)
- Lost Love in Times (2017)
- The Classic of Mountains and Seas (2016)
- Legend of Nine Tails Fox (2016)
- The Hero Qi Ji Guang (抗倭英雄戚继光) (2015)
- Love Alert (2025) (2025)

=== Notable sports ===
- HBO World Championship Boxing
- UFC 196
- Thai Fight
- 8 Max Muay Thai
- Muay Hardcore
- Super Champ Muay Thai
- The Champion
- The Battle and Sang Wien Nak Su
- 2014 FIFA World Cup
- La Liga
- FA Cup

== Presenters ==
=== Current ===
- Phutta-apiwan Ongphrabaramee
- Sarawat Kitpanich
- Yonnakan Kornnattawee
- Teera Thanyananphon
- Sathaphon Riyapa
- Theppakit Chatsuriyawong
- Wiyada Peeraratkul
- Waraporn Sansuk
- Bunyita Ngamsappasin
- Pattaraphon Nithiworapol
- Chanitnun Punnannithi
- Pitisak Yaowanont
- Yingsak Jonglertjesdawong
- Chaiya Mitchai
- Saranchat Mitchai
- Chanya Pakornphat
- Jitdee Sridee
- Chaianan Panchu

=== Former ===
- Vanessa Samucsaruth (now at 9MCOT)
- Natchaya Sanguansuk (now at Amarin TV)
