= Sarama (Thai music) =

Music played in Muay Thai matches

Sarama (Thai: สะระหม่า) is the music that accompanies the pre-fight ritual of Muay Thai matches (known interchangeably as Wai khru ram muay or Ram muay).

== Terminology ==
"Sarama" specifically refers to the song played during the pre-fight ritual; subsequent music accompanying is referred to as phleng muay (lit. 'Music for Boxing' or 'Boxing Music'). The music is performed by up to four musicians, consisting of a Pi (quadruple-reed instrument - similar to oboe) player, a pair of klong khaek players, and a cymbal player (referred to as "ching").

During the Ram Muay the tempo of the music starts out slow and stately to match the mood of the ritual. When the fight commences the tempo is increased and matches the intensity of the audience and action. The music is a defining part of the atmosphere of traditional Muay Thai; other international forms of kickboxing do not feature music in a similar way.

== Instrumentation ==
The ensemble used for playing Sarama is known as a pi muay, a combination of pi (referring to the leading quadruple reed aerophone, called pi) and muay Thai.

- Pii Chawaa

While this instrument's name indicates that it is Javanese in origin, the pi Chawaa closely resembles Indian shehnai reeds and likely originated on the Indian subcontinent before being introduced to Thailand via trade routes through Java. The Pi Chawaa is made of wood and has the similar conical shape and flared bell of a Western oboe, except whereas an oboe uses a double reed, Pi Chawaa uses a quadruple-reed.

- Klong khaek

A pair of lace drums, with each drum assigned a male or female gender. The drums are played in consistent syncopated rhythm (similar to a hocket). These rhythmic lines patterns are known as "Nathap." Javanese in origin (as with the Pii Chawaa), klong khaek translates "Muslim" ("khaek") "Drum" ("klong"). A similar type of drum exists in Cambodian music.

- Ching

Also known by its full name ching chap, a set of Thai brass cupped cymbals. The Ching player plays their own "ching" pattern (contrapuntally to the klong khaek nathap pattern). This pattern consists of four beats, alternating in accent, with the "Ching" beat unaccented and the "chap" beat heavily accented (creating a pattern known as "ching chap ching chap").

== See also ==
- Wai khru ram muay
