= Wai khru ram muay =

Ritual before a Thai boxing fight

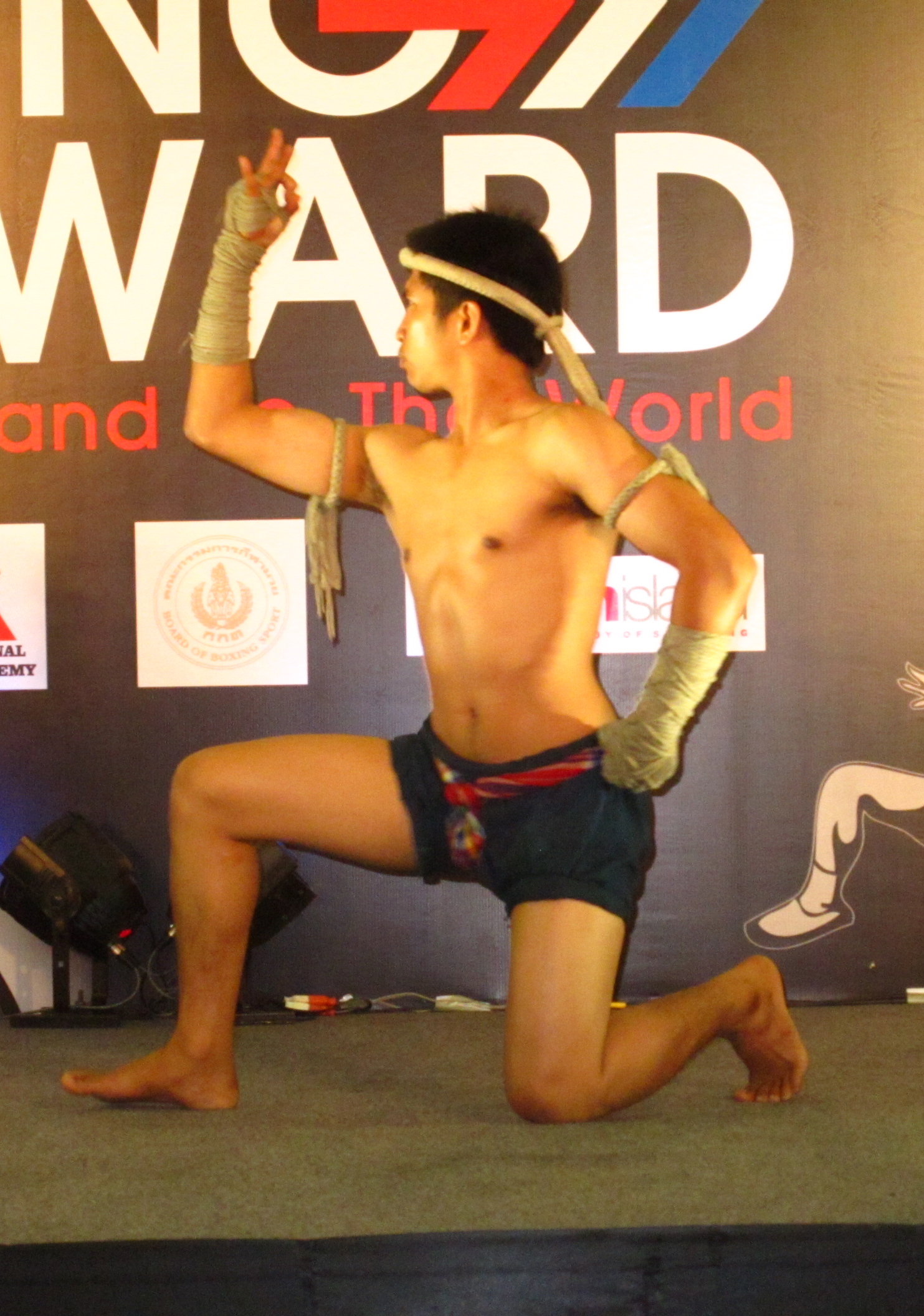
Wai khru ram muay in muay boran

Wai khru ram muay (Thai: ไหว้ครูรำมวย, RTGS: wai khru ram muai, IPA: [wâːj kʰrūː rām mūɛj]) is a ritual performed by participants before fighting in Muay Thai competitions.

Wai khru, or Wai kru, is a Thai concept that exists in almost all of Thai performance art - from traditional Thai music to classical Khon dance and fighting arts, such as Krabi Krabong and Muay Thai. The ritual consists of 2 parts: "Wai khru" and "Ram muay," made up of 4 different Thai words. Wai is a traditional Thai greeting with the palms together as a sign of respect. Khru is the Thai form of the Sanskrit word guru meaning "teacher." Ram is the Thai word for dancing in classical style, and Muay means "boxing." The full term can therefore be translated as "war-dance saluting the teacher," but Thai speakers generally shorten it either to Wai khru or Ram muay. At its core, the Wai khru ceremony reflects the deeply established values of Thai culture - values of respect for authority, gratitude for knowledge, and reverence for tradition. Similarly, the Ram muay is a series of choreographed movements often performed before a Muay Thai bout to show respect and gratitude to the fighter's teacher, parents, and ancestors. In the days when fighters fought in front of the royalty, the Ram muay also paid respect to the king.

== Origins and History ==
Tracing back to the ancient roots of Thailand, Muay Thai wasn't only a form of combat but also a fundamental part of society, deeply intertwined with religious beliefs and cultural practices. In the early days, fighters often asked for blessings and protection from the monks before battles. This practice gradually evolved into the formalized ceremony known as Wai khru, but as the practice of Muay Thai advanced from battlefield tactics to a sport, the spiritual aspects of Wai Kru remained an integral part, transitioning from a connection with spirits to a connection with teachers and trainers. Over the centuries, Wai Kru has transformed from a pre-battle Muay Thai ritual to a timeless tradition embodying respect, gratitude, and cultural heritage. It is a moment of unity, as practitioners come together to honor their shared heritage and forge bonds that go beyond the boundaries of language and nationality.

== Performing the Wai Khru Ceremony ==
Upon entering the ring, fighters circle the ring in a counter-clockwise direction and pray at each corner. They bow their heads at every corner three times in salutation to Buddha, Dharma, and the Sangha of monks. They then commence the ram muay, the movements of which are said to be based on Hanuman. The ram muay is a personal ritual, ranging from the very complex to the very simple, and often contains clues about who trained the fighter and where the fighter is from. The ritual is intricately linked with two significant symbols: the Mongkhon and the Pra Jiad. These traditional accessories hold deep cultural and spiritual significance and are often incorporated into the ritual to enhance its meaning and symbolism. The ram muay is accompanied by music, providing a rhythm to the fighter's movements.

== See also ==
- Wai khru
- Sarama (Thai music)
