= Muay Hardcore =

Sports broadcast in Thailand

- มวยพันธุ์ดุ
- Interactive map of Muay Hardcore
- Address: The Bazaar Hotel; Bangkok; Thailand
- Location: 5 Ratchadaphisek Rd, Chom Phon, Chatuchak, Bangkok 10900
- Coordinates: 13°48′12.2″N 100°34′28.1″E
- Operator: Channel 8 (Thailand)
- Seating type: Chair
- Type: Muay Thai organizer and promotor
- Event: Martial arts
- Field size: TV Broadcast, TV Show
- Field shape: Rectangle
- Parking: Available

Construction
- Years active: 2019-2022

Muay Hardcore (Thai: มวยพันธุ์ดุ) was a weekly Muay Thai program broadcast on Thai television in Bangkok. First aired in 2019, the program sees fighters competing in three-round Muay Thai fights with MMA gloves. The program was discontinued around mid-2022.

== History ==
The idea of forming Muay Hardcore was first proposed in 2019 and immediately implemented. Muay Hardcore and Super Champ Muay Thai are both managed by Channel 8 Thailand. Like its sister program Muay Thai Super Champ, Muay Hardcore often pairs Thai fighters against foreign fighters. The main difference between these two events (which are actually partners), is the use of gloves. Muay Hardcore uses MMA gloves (4 oz) and Muay Thai Super Champ use 12 oz. Unlike Super Champ Muay Thai, fighters in Muay Hardcore do not perform the pre-fight wai khru ram muay and there is no traditional music playing during matches.

With fighters competing in MMA gloves and its similarity to mixed martial arts competitions, Muay Hardcore has been considered by large organizations such as ONE Championship, whose Muay Thai bouts also see the use of 4-oz gloves. Furthermore, according to promoters, Muay Hardcore is regarded as a feeder program for fighters who aspire to enter larger promotions.

Muay Hardcore aired its final broadcast on May 28, 2022.

== Live broadcaster ==
Muay Hardcore competitions are broadcast live on Saturday nights at 7:00 p.m. on Channel 8. The events during the COVID-19 epidemic were performed in accordance with hygienic principles at The Bazaar Hotel in Chatuchak District.

== See also ==
- Channel 8 (Thailand)
- Super Champ Muay Thai
