= Super Champ Muay Thai =

Muay Thai organizer and promotor

Super Champ
- ซุปเปอร์แชมป์
- Interactive map of Super Champ
- Address: Lumpinee Boxing Stadium (current); The Bazaar Hotel (former); Bangkok; Thailand
- Location: Current: 6 Ram Inthra Rd, Anusawari, Bang Khen, Bangkok 10220; Former: 5 Ratchadaphisek Rd, Chom Phon, Chatuchak, Bangkok 10900
- Coordinates: 13°52′1.36″N 100°36′31.88″E; 13°48′12.2″N 100°34′28.1″E (former)
- Operator: Channel 8 (Thailand)
- Seating type: Chair
- Type: Muay Thai organizer and promotor
- Event: Martial arts
- Field size: TV Broadcast, TV Show
- Field shape: Rectangle
- Parking: Available

Construction
- Years active: 2018-present

Website
- https://muaythaitickets.com/lumpinee-stadium-events/

Muay Thai Super Champ (Thai: มวยไทยซุปเปอร์แชมป์), known as Lumpinee Super Champ (LSC) and previously known as LWC Super Champ (Lumpinee World Championship Super Champ), is a weekly Muay Thai program that broadcasts live on Thai television in Bangkok. Unlike weekly traditional Muay Thai programs, Super Champ features three-round Muay Thai fights.

In 2023, the program changed its name to LWC Super Champ and its venue to Lumpinee Boxing Stadium. In 2026, the program was renamed Lumpinee Super Champ.

== History ==
=== Muay Thai Super Champ ===
The Super Champ was formed in Bangkok in 2018 after the separation of the Channel 8 TV coverage team from Max Muay Thai. Super Champ fight cards exclusively consist of three-round fights in order to encourage fighters start quickly and constantly be active, in addition to present a television-friendly format of Muay Thai. There are usually 7 fights per week in which foreign fighters face Thai fighters. This event is held under traditional Muay Thai rules with 12 oz gloves, unlike Muay Hardcore, which is contested with 4 oz gloves. Super Champ fights are three rounds in duration and attendance is free. Unlike Muay Hardcore, fighters perform the wai khru ram muay and all fights in Super Champ are accompanied by traditional music. Venum is the equipment sponsor of the Super Champ, as well as for the ring.

=== LWC Super Champ ===
In mid-January 2023, Super Champ was rebranded as LWC Super Champ (Lumpinee World Championship Super Champ). The program also changed its location to the Lumpinee Boxing Stadium. Furthermore, LWC Super Champ featured a mix both three-round and five-round Muay Thai fights.

LWC Super Champ also hosts weekly tournaments across different weight classes, including the four-man, one-night Ngern Chaiyo Muay Thai tournament and the Global House Grand Prix. On select events, main events have also been title fights for Lumpinee Stadium titles.

On November 28, 2025 it was announced that LWC Super Champ would suspend broadcasts throughout December 2025.

=== Lumpinee Super Champ ===
After three months, Super Champ returned under the new name Lumpinee Super Champ (LSC) on March 10, 2026.

== Live broadcaster ==
Super Champ broadcasts are aired live on Sunday nights at 7:00 p.m. on Channel 8. The events during the COVID-19 epidemic are performed in accordance with hygienic principles at The Bazaar Hotel in Chatuchak District.

In October 10, 2021, as a result of COVID lockdowns in Bangkok, Super Champ temporarily moved its shows to Patong Stadium in Phuket. The show returned to The Bazaar Hotel in Bangkok in early 2022.

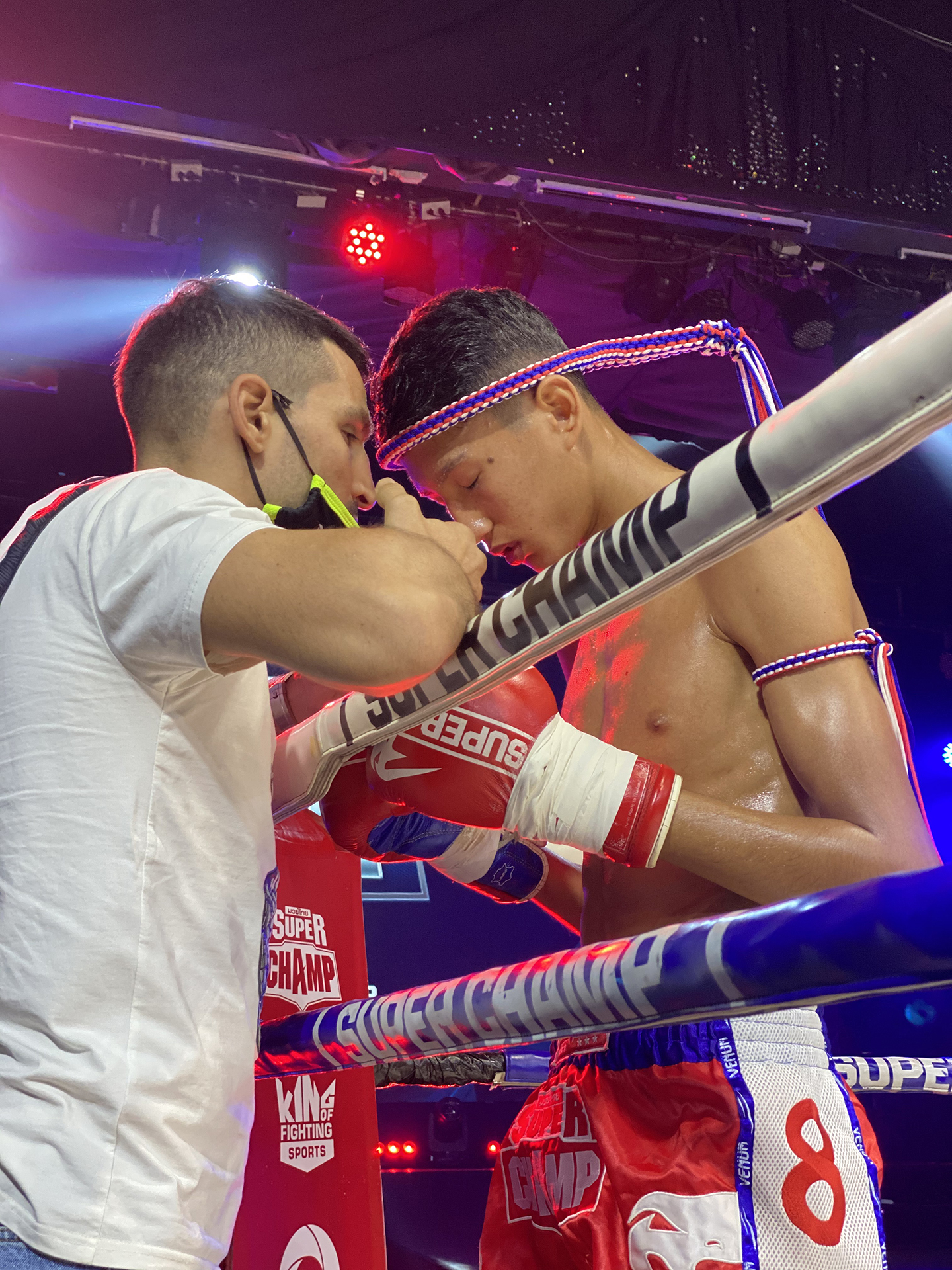
Nabil Anane and his coach Mehdi Zatout in the Super Champ (24 November 2020)

While Channel 8 is still the television broadcaster for LWC Super Champ, the airing time has been switched to 6:00 p.m. on Saturday nights.

== See also ==
- Channel 8 (Thailand)
- Muay Hardcore
- Max Muay Thai
