= List of WBC Muaythai female diamond champions =

This is a list of WBC Muaythai female diamond champions, showing female diamond champions certificated by the World Boxing Council Muaythai (WBC Muaythai). The WBC, which is one of the four major governing bodies in professional boxing, started certifying their own Muay Thai world champions in 19 different weight classes in 2005.

== Super bantamweight ==
| No. | Name | Date winning | Date losing | Days | Defenses |
|---|---|---|---|---|---|
| 1 | (United Kingdom) (England) Ruth Ashdown | August 15, 2018 | Current | 2630 | 0 |
Ashdown defeated Dokmaipa Kiatpompetch (Thailand) by majority decision after 5R at "WBC EWD Greater Chinese Professional Boxing Championships" at Southern Stadium in Wan Chai, Hong Kong.

== See also ==
- List of WBC Muaythai world champions
- List of WBC Muaythai female world champions
- List of WBC Muaythai international champions
- List of WBC Muaythai female international champions
- List of WBC Muaythai international challenge winners
- List of WBC Muaythai female international challenge winners
- List of WBC Muaythai European champions
- List of IBF Muaythai world champions
