= List of WBC Muaythai European champions =

This is a list of WBC Muaythai European champions, showing every European champion certificated by the World Boxing Council Muaythai (WBC Muaythai). The WBC, which is one of the four major governing bodies in professional boxing, started certifying their own Muay Thai world champions in 19 different weight classes in 2005.

== Heavyweight ==
No.	Name	Date winning	Date losing	Days	Defenses
	(Portugal) Carlos DeGraca (Carlos Monteiro Graca)	November 19, 2016	?	?	?
Degraco defeated Lyndon Knowles (United Kingdom) by TKO(Elbow strike) at 3R at "Muay Thai Mayhem" at Copthorne Effingham Gatwick Hotel in Copthorne, England, UK.

== Cruiserweight ==
No.	Name	Date winning	Date losing	Days	Defenses
	(Germany) Gerardo "The Blade" Atti	September 12, 2020	?	?	?
Atti defeated GLORY Fighter Jakob Styben (Germany) by unanimous decision at "Day of Destruction 13" in Hamburg, Nord, Germany, and he won the vacant title.

== Light Heavyweight ==
No.	Name	Date winning	Date losing	Days	Defenses
	(Portugal) (Cape Verde) Luis Malyck Tavares	June 4, 2016	?	?	?
Tavares defeated Damien Ozenne (France) by decision at "MT-DAY" at Gymnase Questel Delaporte in Dives-sur-Mer, Basse-Normandie, France, and he won the vacant title.
	(France) (Algeria) Malik Aliane	June 2, 2018	?	?	?
Malik Aliane (France/Algeria) defeated Rubén Lee (Rubén García/Spain) at "Caesar Internacional Fighting Championship" at Palacio de Congresos de Marbella in Marbella, Málaga, Spain, and he won the vacant title.

== Super middleweight ==
No.	Name	Date winning	Date losing	Days	Defenses
	(France) Wendy Annonay	March 24, 2012	?	?	?
Annonay defeated Kévin Haas (Luxembourg) by unanimous decision (47-48/45-50/46-49) at "Thai Boxing Show Time 3" at Salle Henri-Desbuquois in Hazebrouck, Nord, France, and he won the vacant title.

== Middleweight ==
No.	Name	Date winning	Date losing	Days	Defenses
	(France) Kamel Mezatni	February 23, 2013	?	?	?
Mezatni defeated Grega Smole (Slovenia) by decision at "Lion Belt Fight Night 3" at Gymnase Le Phare in Belfort, France.
	(Portugal) Diogo Calado	December 12, 2015	?	?	?
Calado defeated Kamel Mezatni (France) by decision after 5R at "Diamond League" at Pavilhão n.º 1 do Estádio Universitário de Lisboa in Lisbon, Portugal, and he won the vacant title. After this bout, he had been certified as "in recess".

== Super welterweight ==
No.	Name	Date winning	Date losing	Days	Defenses
	(France) Expedito Valin	September 7, 2013	?	?	?
Valin defeated Mohamed Houmer (France) by split decision (48-46 47-48 48-46) after 5R at "Millenium Team Fight" at Stade Volnay à Saint-Pierre in Réunion, France, and he won the vacant title.
	(France) (Turkey) Aydin Tuncay	January 23, 2016	?	?	?
Tuncay defeated Michael Longin (France) by TKO (Referee stoppage: forefit) at 3R at "Burning Series 5" at Espace Sportif Maurice Nicod in Arbent, Auvergne-Rhône-Alpes, France, and he won the vacant title.
	(France) Kaiss Najm	February 14, 2017	?	?	?
Najm defeated Luca Tagliarino (Italy) by decision at "La Nuit Des Challenges 17" at Palais des Sports Mulhouse in Mulhouse, Haut-Rhin, France, and he won the vacant title.
	(Romania) Popa Aurel	February 23, 2019	?	?	?
Aurel defeated Lorenzo Di Vara (Italy) by KO5 at "RingWar 4" at Palasesto Sesto San Giovanni, Italy, and he won the vacant title.

== Welterweight ==
No.	Name	Date winning	Date losing	Days	Defenses
	(France) Abdoulaye M'baye	May 25, 2013	?	?	?
M'baye defeated Rui Briceño (Portugal) by decision at "ONE VS ONE" at Complexe Omnisport Paul Mahier in Trappes, Yvelines, France, and he won the vacant title.
	(France) Ibrahim Chiahou	September 7, 2013	?	?	?
Chiahou defeated Fabrice Mouniama (France) by unanimous decision (49-46/50-47/50-46) after 5R at "Millenium Team Fight" at Stade Volnay à Saint-Pierre in Réunion, France, and he won the vacant title.
	(France) Anthony Gazel	June 4, 2016	January 28, 2017	?	?
Gazel defeated Yassine Hannachi (France) by TKO at 4R "Hurricane Fighting 3" at Gymnase Cabot in Châlons-en-Champagne, Marne, France, and he won the vacant title.
	(France) Abdelnour Ali Kada	January 28, 2017	?	?	?
Ali Kada defeated Anthony Gazel by TKO at 4R at "Burning Series 6" at Salle multisports Espace in Rue du Châtelet, Gaillard, France, and he won Gazel's title.

== Super lightweight ==
No.	Name	Date winning	Date losing	Days	Defenses
	(United Kingdom) (England) Luke Turner	August 27, 2016	?	?	?
Turner defeated Al Amin Radhi (France) by unanimous decision after 5R at "Muay Thai Boxing" at On-X Arena in Linwood, Scotland, UK, and he won the vacant tile.
	(France) Omar Sellami	February 4, 2017	?	?	?
Sellami defeated Popa Aurel (Romania) by decision at "Emperor Chok Dee 2017" at the Parc des Sport in Vandœuvre-lès-Nancy, Meurthe-et-Moselle, France, and he won the vacant title.

== Lightweight ==
No.	Name	Date winning	Date losing	Days	Defenses
	(France) Madani Belhadad	January 28, 2017	?	?	?
Belhadad decfeated Paweł Szymański (Poland/Italy) by decision at "GO FIGHT 3" at Salle Dumont (Stade Denyaer) in Marly, France, and he won the vacant title.

== Featherweight ==
No.	Name	Date winning	Date losing	Days	Defenses
	(United Kingdom) (England) Reece Thomson	November 19, 2016	?	?	?
Thomson defeated Karl Hodges (Ireland) by decision after 5R at "Muay Thai Mayhem" at Copthorne Effingham Gatwick Hotel in Copthorne, England, UK.

== Bantamweight ==
No.	Name	Date winning	Date losing	Days	Defenses
	(France) Mohamed Bouchareb	May 25, 2013	?	?	?
Bouchareb defeated Nestor Rodriguez (Spain) by decision at "ONE VS ONE" at Complexe Omnisport Paul Mahier in Trappes, Yvelines, France, and he won the vacant title.

== See also ==
- List of WBC Muaythai world champions
- List of WBC Muaythai female world champions
- List of WBC Muaythai international champions
- List of WBC Muaythai female international champions
- List of WBC Muaythai international challenge winners
- List of WBC Muaythai female international challenge winners
