= List of WBC Muaythai world champions =

This is a list of WBC Muaythai world champions, showing every world champion certificated by World Boxing Council's WBC Muaythai. The WBC, which is one of the four major governing bodies in professional boxing, started certifying their own Muay Thai world champions in 19 different weight classes in 2005.

== Super heavyweight (defunct) ==
Weight limit: Over 235 lb (106.6 kg)

Defunct since January 2021

No.	Name	Date winning	Date losing	Days	Defenses
1	(Denmark) Edmoud M'Bulu-Monso / Ed Monso / Ed Monzo	March 21, 2009	?	?	0
M'Bulu-Monso defeated Stipan Radić (Croatia) by KO in 1R at Ridehuset in Aarhus, Copenhagen, Denmark. After this bout, he had been certified as "in recess" for years.
2	(Australia) Steve Bonner	March 14, 2013	?	?	0
Bonner defeated Tafa Misipati (New Zealand) by the unanimous decision (49-44/50-43/49-44) after 5R at Kingsway Indoor Stadium in Western Australia, Australia.
3	(Cameroon) Cyril Bonye	December 5, 2014	?	?	0
Bonye defeated Sébastien Favre (France) by TKO in 3R at Pattaya Stadium in Pattaya, Thailand. The referee stopped the contest by cut after Favre had got Bonye's left elbow strike.
4	(Thailand) Benz RSM	May 27, 2016	February 23, 2017	272	0
Benz defeated Yassine Boughanem (Belgium) by unanimous decision (50-47, 49-47, 50-46) after 5R at Rajadamnern Stadium in Bangkok, Thailand.
5	(United States) Steven Banks	February 23, 2017	February 26, 2018	368	0
Banks defeated Benz RSM (Thailand) by KO with a left elbow strike at 3R at Rajadamnern Stadium in Bangkok, Thailand.
6	(Belgium) Yassine Boughanem	February 26, 2018	January 1, 2020	674	3
Boughanem defeated Steven Banks (United States) by decision after 5R at Rajadamnern Stadium in Bangkok, Thailand, and he won the vacant title. He won the vacant title of Phoenix World Super heavyweight championship. Boughanem defeated James McSweeney (United Kingdom) by decision after 5R at Lumpini Stadium in Bangkok, Thailand to defend his title. Boughanem defeated Jurjendal (Thailand) by decision after 5R at Phoenix 10 in Brussels, Belgium to defend his title. Boughanem defeated Bruno Susano (Portugal) by TKO in 2R during PSM Fight Night in Brussels, Belgium, to defend his title.

== Heavyweight ==
Weight limit: Over 224 lb (101.6 kg)

In January 2021 WBC revised this weight class limit from 235 lb (106.6 kg) to its current limit.

No.	Name	Date winning	Date losing	Days	Defenses
1	(United States) Shane Del Rosario / Rocky Rosario	September 8, 2007	January 12, 2008	126	0
Rosario defeated Ricardo van den Bos (Netherlands) by KO when he was knocked down 3 times in 2R at the Normandie Casino in Gardena, California, United States.
2	(Netherlands) Ginty Vrede	January 12, 2008	January 28, 2008	16	0
Vrede defeated Shane Del Rosario (United States) by KO in 1R at the Hilton Casino Hotel in Las Vegas, United States. Two weeks later, on January 28, 2008, Vrede died aged 22 from cardiac arrest during a training session in Amsterdam.
3	(United States) Shane Del Rosario / Rocky Rosario	July 26, 2008	Vacated		0
Rosario defeated Raúl Romero (Mexico) by KO at 2R 1:20 at Las Vegas Hilton Hotel in Las Vegas, Nevada, United States.
4	(Argentina) Cristian Bosch / Cristian Gabriel González Bosch	April 2, 2011	June 9, 2012	434	0
Bosch defeated Raúl Romero (Mexico) by KO at 1R by a right cross in Mexico City, Mexico.
5	(Brazil) Fabiano Aoki / Fabiano Gonçalves Aoki	June 9, 2012	Vacated		0
Aoki defeated Cristian Bosch (Argentina) by KO at 2R 2:28 by a jumping right knee attack at Impact Exhibition and Convention Center in Muang Thong Thani, Pak Kret, Nonthaburi, Thailand. After this bout, he had been certified as "in recess" for few years.
6	(Azerbaijan) Zabit Samedov	August 23, 2016	Vacated	131	0
Samedov defeated Cătălin Moroșanu (Romania) by KO at 1R by a right knee shot at Sports Hall Collision in Grozny, Russia.
	(United Kingdom) Lyndon Knowles				
No information about his title reign has been found yet, other than that Matuesz Duczmal beat the previous champion, Lyndon Knowles.
7	(Poland) Matuesz Duczmal	July 24, 2021	November 27, 2021	156	0
Duczmal defeated Lyndon Knowles (United Kingdom) to win the title.
8	(United Kingdom) Lyndon Knowles	November 27, 2021	October 14, 2023	730	1
Knowless defeated Mateusz Duczmal (Poland) by Decision (unanimous) after 5R to win the title. Knowless defeated Oly Yves Rolandl (Ivory Coast) via KO after 3R to defend the title.
9	(Australia) Alex Roberts	October 14, 2023	Vacated	258	0
Roberts defeated Lyndon Knowles (United Kingdom) via Decision (unanimous) after 5R to win the title.
10	(United Kingdom) Lyndon Knowles	June 29, 2024	Vacated	508	1
Knowles defeated Simon Mendes (Spain) via TKO after 4R to win the title. Knowless defeated Alexandr Savin ( (Italy) ) by Decision after 5R.
11	(Germany) Gerardo Atti	Feb 7, 2026~	Current		0
Atti defeated Simon Mendes (Spain) via TKO after 3R to win the title in Usedom, Germany.

== Bridgerweight (defunct) ==
Weight limit: 224 lb (101.6 kg)

In January 2021 WBC changed the name of this weight class from Super cruiserweight to its current name and revised this weight class limit from 210 lb (95.3 kg) to its current limit to bring it closer to boxing's newcomer Bridgerweight class.

No.	Name	Date winning	Date losing	Days	Defenses
1	(Australia) Steve McKinnon	June 20, 2008	February 4, 2017	1656	3
McKinnon defeated Ashwin Balrak (Netherlands) by the unanimous decision (50-46/49-46/50-45) after 5R at Trelawny Stadium in Montego Bay, Jamaica. Originally, this bout was for the vacant interim championship, and McKinnon was going to fight against the winner of another interim championship between Ramazan Ramazanov (Russia) and Rodney Faverus (Netherlands) for unify the title. McKinnon defeated Eduardo Maiorino (Brazil) by KO with a knee attack at 1R on October 16, 2010, at Luna Park in Sydney, Australia, and he retained his title(1). McKinnon defeated Stéphane Susperregui (France) by split decision after 5R on December 19, 2010, at Hainan Island, China, and he retained his title(2). McKinnon defeated Frank Muñoz (Spain) by KO with a right overhand hook at 1R on June 9, 2012, at Impact Exhibition and Convention Center in Muang Thong Thani, Pak Kret, Nonthaburi, Thailand. After this bout, he had been being certified as "in recess".
2	(Algeria) Zinedine Hameur-Lain	February 4, 2017	Vacated	331	0
Hameur-Lain defeated Budimir Bajbić (Serbia) by KO with a left middle kick in 1R at the Parc des Sport in Vandœuvre-lès-Nancy, Meurthe-et-Moselle, France.

== Cruiserweight ==
Weight limit: 190 lb (86.2 kg)

In January 2008 WBC revised this weight class limit from 200 lb (90.7 kg) to its current limit.

No.	Name	Date winning	Date losing	Days	Defenses
1	(Australia) Nathan Corbett	December 10, 2005	?	?	0
Corbett defeated Ryo "Magnum" Sakai (Japan) by KO with a right knee strike in 3R at Gold Coast Convention Centre in Gold Coast, Queensland, Australia.
2	(France) Frédérique Bellonie / Frédéric Bellonie	December 22, 2008	February 13, 2010	418	0
Bellonie defeated Bruno Kamga (Cameroon) by KO at 2R.
3	(Croatia) Ivan Stanić	February 13, 2010	?	?	0
Stanić defeated Frédérique Bellonie (France) by split decision after 5R at Kvarner Hotel in Primorje-Gorski Kotar County, Opatija, Croatia. After this bout, he had been certified as "in recess" for few years.
4	(United Kingdom) Marlon Hunt	March 7, 2014	?	?	0
Hunt defeated Andreij Manzolo (Estonia) by decision after 5R at Oracle Conference Center of Dolmen Hotel in Bugibba, Malta. The bout was unification match with ISKA Muay Thai World Cruiserweight title.
5	(Germany) Gerardo Atti	September 25, 2021	March 4, 2023	525	1
Atti defeated Juan Cervantesthe via KO after 3R to win the title. He defeated Mark MacKinnon (Canada) via KO after 2R in Calgary, Canada to defend the title. After this he was in recess for a while.
6	(United Kingdom) Scott Stewart	March 4, 2023	October 1, 2023	211	0
He won the title against Alexandr Savin (Italy) via TKO after 3R
7	(Germany) Gerardo Atti	October 1, 2023	July 13, 2024	286	0
Atti defeated Scott Stewart (United Kingdom) via split decision after 5R in Bolton, United Kingdom to reclaim his title.
8	(Australia) Jayden Eynaud	July 13, 2024	Vacated		0
Eynaud defeated Gerardo Atti (Germany) via KO after 1R in Australia to win the title.
9	(Russia) Ali Aliev	December 13, 2025	Current	290	0
Aliev defeated Chip Pollard (United States) by Decision after 5R in Doha, Qatar.

== Light heavyweight ==
Weight limit: 175 lb (79.4 kg)

No.	Name	Date winning	Date losing	Days	Defenses
1	(Denmark) Basam Chahrour	December 2, 2006	Vacated	456	0
Chahrour defeated Simon Lenetof ( (Sweden) ) by decision after 5R in Copenhagen, Denmark. Originally, Chahrour was going to fight against Marcus Öberg ( (Sweden) ) on September 2, 2006, at MusikTeatret Albertslund in Albertslund, Denmark, but the bout was changed.
2	(Thailand) Kaoklai Kaennorsing	March 14, 2010	February 23, 2011	346	0
Kaoklai defeated Ryo "Magnum" Sakai by KO at 3R 1:22 with a left elbow strike at El Monte Expo Center in El Monte, California, United States.
3	(Russia) Artem Levin	February 23, 2011	May 3, 2013	800	1
Levin defeated Kaoklai Kaennorsing (Thailand) by unanimous decision after 5R at Sold-Put Arena in Chelyabinsk, Russia. Levin defeated Cheick Sidibé (France) in Chelyabinsk, Russia on March 3, 2012, and he retained his title(1). After this bout, he had been certified as "in recess" for few years.
Interim	(United States) Joe Schilling	October 21, 2011	May 3, 2013	560	1
Schilling defeated Kaoklai Kaennorsing (Thailand) by TKO(Referee stoppage) with 3 knock downs at 1R at Club Nokia in Los Angeles, California, USA, and he won the interim championship. Schilling defeated Karapet Karapetyan (Armenia) by unanimous decision (47-49/47-49/47-49) after 5R on June 9, 2012, at Impact Exhibition and Convention Center in Muang Thong Thani, Pak Kret, Nonthaburi, Thailand.
4	(Canada) Simon Marcus	May 3, 2013	February 1, 2014	274	0
Marucs defeated Dmitry Valent (Belgium) by split decision after 5R during C3: King of Fighters in Chengdou, China to win the title.
5	(France) Cheick Sidibé	February 1, 2014	Vacated	699	0
Sidibé defeated Diogo Calado (Portugal) by TKO in 2R during Grande Soirée de la Boxe in La Riche, France, to win the title.
6	(France) Cédric Tousch	February 27, 2016	Vacated	368	1
Tousch defeated Luis Malyck Tavares (Netherlands) by decision after 5R at Salle Jean-Marie Bialy in Rue du Petit Plessis, La Riche, France. Tousch defeated Aydin Tuncay (France) by decision after 5R during La Nuit Des Challenges 17 in Mulhouse, France, to defend his title.
7	(Australia) Ben Johnston	October 27, 2018	June 6, 2019	222	0
Johnston defeated Dan Edwards (United Kingdom) by TKO after 4R in Brisbane, Australia to win the title. He vacated the title upon retirement in June 2019.
8	(Scotland) George Mann	June 5, 2021	2022	210	0
Mann defeated Charlie Bubb (Australia) in Perth, Australia to win the title.Mann defends title against Mikael Benata.
9	(Morocco) Mouhcine Chafi	July 8, 2023	Vacated	177	0
Chafi defeated Miles Simson (Netherlands) in Barcelona, Spain to win the title.
10	(Australia) Charlie Bubb	April 27, 2024	Vacated	670	2
Bubb defeated Marcus Sundin Liljedorff (Sweden) by TKO after 3R in Sopot, Poland to win the title. Bubb defeated Jomkhon Kiatnongluang (Thailand) by KO after 3R in Warwick Farm, Australia to defend the title. Bubb defeated Daniel Bonner (England) by decision after 5R in Warwick Farm, Australia to defend the title. Vacated title February 26, 2026 to move up to Cruiserweight.
11	(Morocco) Mouhcine Chafi	May 30, 2023	Current	171	0
Chafi defeated Joakim Hagg (Sweden) by TKO after 3R in Canovellas, Spain to win the title.

== Super middleweight ==
Weight limit: 168 lb (76.2 kg)

No.	Name	Date winning	Date losing	Days	Defenses
1	(Thailand) Jaochalam Chatjanokgym / Jaowchalam Chatjanokgym	?	January 8, 2011	?	?
2	(United Kingdom) Stephen Wakeling	January 8, 2011	?	?	?
Wakeling defeated Jaowchalam Chatjanokgym by KO with a left knee attack at 4R in Tipp Plaza in Pattaya, Thailand
Interim	(France) Grégory Choplin	May 4, 2013	September 20, 2014	504	1
Choplin defeated Luís Reis ( (Portugal) ) by decision after 5R at Salle Pierre Scohy in Aulnay-sous-Bois, Seine-Saint-Denis, France. Choplin defeated Ramon Kübler by TKO(Cut) at 2R on April 14, 2016, at Espace Venise in Sarcelles, Val-d'Oise, France. He retained his title(1). After this bout, he was demoted to the interim champion.
3	(France) Yohan Lidon	September 20, 2014	?	?	?
Lidon defeated Jaochalam Sitkanokgym ( (Thailand) ) aka Jaochalam Chatjanokgym by KO with a right high kick at 1R at Palais des Sports de St Fons in Saint-Fons, Auvergne-Rhône-Alpes, France
Interim	(France) Samy Sana	May 27, 2016	?	?	0
Sana defeated Eakchanachai Kaewsamrit by TKO with left hook at 3R 2:15 at Rajadamnern Stadium in Bangkok, Thailand.
4	(France) Hamza Ngoto	August 23, 2018	2021	862	1
Ngoto defeated Thongchai Sitsongpeenong (Thailand) by KO (Right vertical elbow strike to head) at 2R at "Best Of Siam XIII" at Rajadamnern Stadium in Bangkok, Thailand, and he won the vacant title. Ngoto defeated Salimkhan Ibragimov (Russia) by decision after 5R during AMMA in Phuket, Thailand to defend his title.
5	(England) George Jarvis	April 9, 2022	February 25, 2023	862	0
Jarvis defeated Tobias Alexandersson (Sweden) by Decision (Unanimous) at 5R at "Muaythai Mayhem" in Crawley, England, and won the vacant title.
6	(Scotland) George Mann	February 25, 2023	2024	310	0
Mann defeated George Jarvis (England) by Decision (Unanimous) at 5R at "Muaythai Mayhem" in Perth, Australia, and won the title.
7	(England) Daniel Bonner	September 8, 2024	December 6, 2025	454	0
Bonner defeated Andronikos Evripidou (Cyprus) by Decision (Unanimous) at 5R at in Wigan, England, and won the title.
8	(New Zealand) Titus Proctor	December 6, 2025	Current	346	0
Proctor defeated Daniel Bonner (United Kingdom) by TKO at 4R in New Zealand, and won the title.

== Middleweight ==
Weight limit: 160 lb (72.6 kg)

No.	Name	Date winning	Date losing	Days	Defenses
1	(United Kingdom) Stephen Wakeling	March 12, 2006	February 25, 2007	350	0
Wakeling defeated John Wayne Parr (Australia) by split decision (48-49/49-48/48-47) after 5R at Wembley Conference Centre in Wembley, London, England.
Interim	(Thailand) Lamsongkram Chuwattana	June 3, 2006	February 25, 2007	267	0
Lamsongkram defeated Alan Ofeyo (Kyrgyzstan) by decision after 5R at Bishkek capital city arena in Bishkek, Kyrgyzstan.
2	(Thailand) Lamsongkram Chuwattana	February 25, 2007	November 28, 2009	1007	4
Lamsongkram defeated Stephen Wakeling (United Kingdom) by decision after 5R at the York Hall in Bethnal Green, London, England, and he unified WBC Muaythai World Middleweight championship. Lamsongkram defeated Yohan Lidon (France) by unanimous decision (50-44/49-46/49-46) after 5R at Normandie Casino in Gardena, California, on September 8, 2007, and he retained his title(1). Lamsongkram defeated Farid Villaume (France) by decision after 5R in Montengo Bay, Jamaica on June 20, 2008, and he retained his title(2). Lamsongkram defeated Mukai Maromo (Canada) by KO (Body shot) at 2R 1:23 at San Manuel Indian Casino & Bingo in Highland, California, United States on September 4, 2008, and he retained his title(3). Originally, Lamsongkram was going to fight against Shane Campbell (Canada), but it had been changed. Lamsongkram defeated Pavel Abozny (Belarus) by TKO with left low kick at 3R 0:57 at National Olympic Sports Center in Beijing, China on January 18, 2009, and he retained his title(3). Originally, he was going to fight against Youness Elmshannri, it had been changed.
3	(France) Yohan Lidon	November 28, 2009	Vacated	1115	1
Lidon defeated Lamsongkram Chuwattana (Thailand) by KO with right overhand hook at 1R at Palais des sports de Lyon-Gerland in Lyon, France. Lidon defeated Grégory Choplin (France) by TKO(Doctor stoppage:left leg injury) at 4R at Casino Le Lyon Vert in La Tour de Salvagny, France on December 17, 2011, and he retained his title(1). After this bout, he had been certified as "in recess" for few years
Interim	(United States) Ky Hollenbeck	May 14, 2011	?	?	1
Hollenbeck defeated Grégory Choplin (France) by unanimous decision after 5R at the Star of the Desert Arena at Buffalo Bill's Casino in Primm, Nevada, United States. Hollenbeck defeated Simon Chu (United Kingdom) by unanimous decision (50-45/49-47/49-47) after 5R at the Star of the Desert Arena at Buffalo Bill's Casino in Primm, Nevada, United States on August 20, 2011.
4	(France) Raphaël Llodra	March 9, 2013	Vacated	?	0
Llodra defeated Jakub Gazdík (Czech Republic) by KO at 1R at Salle Jean-Marie Bialy in La Riche, France. Originally, he was going to fight against Vladimar Moravcik (Slovakia). After this bout, he had been certified as "in recess" for few years.Llodra was promoted to the regular champion because Yohan Lidon, the current regular champion, was demoted to recess champion in 2013. Llodra was demoted to recess champion in 2014.
5	(Portugal) Francisco Matos	October 29, 2016	Vacated	120	0
Francisco Matos defeated Sofian Seboussi (France) by KO in 5R in Basel, Suisse.
6	(France) Jimmy Vienot	February 23, 2017	Current	3554	0
Viennot defeated Denpanum Kelacorath (Thailand) by KO at 3R by left elbow strike at Rajadamnern Stadium in Bangkok, Thailand. At least, he was demoted to interim champion in January 2018. At least, it is confirmed that he was demoted to In-recess champion at the rating in April 2018.
7	(Belgium) Youssef Boughanem	February 26, 2018	November 7, 2021	1350	5
Boughanem defeated Noppakaw Sairiruckmuaythai (Thailand) by TKO (forfeit) at 3R, and he won the vacant regular title. In this bout, Boughanem retained his titles of Rajadamnern stadium middleweight and Phoenix world middleweight. Boughanem defeated Kongjak Por Pao In (Thailand) by decision after 5R during Phoenix 10 in Brussels, Belgium to retain the title. Boughanem defeated Joe Craven (United Kingdom) by TKO in 4R during PSM Fight Night in Brussels, Belgium to defend the title. Boughanem defeated Tobias Alexandersson (Sweden) by decision after 5R in Brussels, Belgium to defend the title. Boughanem defeated Niclas Larsen (Norway) by decision after 5R in Brussels, Belgium to defend the title.
8	(England) Liam Nolan	November 7, 2021	Vacated	272	0
Noaln defeated Youssef Boughanem (Belgium) by split decision in Hilversum, Netherlands.
9	(Brazil) Victor Hugo	August 6, 2022	February 12, 2023	190	0
Hugo defeated Beckham KhaoYaiArtTreeResort (Thailand) by decision after 5R in Tunisia.
10	(Armenia) Salimkhan Ibragimov	February 12, 2023	Vacated	327	0
Ibragimov defeated Viktor Hugo (Brazil) by decision in Thailand. Vacated January 5, 2024 due to the inactivity of the champion.
11	(England) Joe Ryan	August 10, 2024	February 22, 2025	196	0
Joe Ryan defeated Beckham BigWinChampionGym (Thailand) by decision in Scotland.
12	(Thailand) Kongthailand Kiatnavy	February 22, 2025	Vacated	282	0
Kiatnavy defeated Joe Ryan (England) by decision in Thailand.Vacant by December.
13	(Republic of Ireland) Garrett Smylie	December 2, 2025	Current	350	0
Smylie defeated Tristan Stauffer (Switzerland) by KO in the 3rd round.

== Super welterweight ==
Weight limit: 154 lb (69.9 kg)

No.	Name	Date winning	Date losing	Days	Defenses
1	(Thailand) Yodsanklai Fairtex	December 10, 2005	2009	?	2
Yodsanklai defeated John Wayne Parr by decision after 5R at Gold Coast Convention and Exhibition Centre in Queensland, Australia. Yodsanklai became the 1st world champion of WBC Muaythai in history. Yodsanklai defeated Mark Vogel by TKO(Referee stoppage) with left elbow strike after 1R at Bayer-Sporthalle Wuppertal in Wuppertal, Germany, on November 11, 2006, and he retained his title(1).Yodsanklai defeated Malaipet Team Diamond ( (Thailand) ) by TKO(Doctor stoppage: cut) at 3R 3:00 at Trelawny stadium in Montengo Bay, Jamaica on June 20, 2008, and he retained his title(2).
2	(Equatorial Guinea) Alejandro Asumu Osa	February 13, 2010	June 6, 2012	856	0
Asumu Osa defeated Prakaysaeng Sir Oar ( (Thailand) ) by KO at 3R at Sofitel Malabo President Palace in Malabo, Equatorial Guinea. Originally, this title was going to be held between Kem Sitsongpeenong ( (Thailand) ) and Ali Abrayem ( (Belgium) ) in France on January 31, 2010.
3	(Thailand) Kem Sitsongpeenong	June 6, 2012	January 25, 2014	598	1
Kem defeated Alejandro Asumu Osa (Equatorial Guinea) by TKO(Referee stoppage) with right elbow strike at 2R at Impact Exhibition and Convention Center in Muang Thong Thani, Pak Kret, Nonthaburi, Thailand. Kem defeated Dylan Salvador (France) by split decision (47-48/49-47/50-45) after 5R at Stade Volnay à Saint-Pierre in Réunion, France, on September 7, 2013.
4	(Belarus) Vitaly Gurkov	January 25, 2014	2014	?	0
Gurkov defeated Kem Sitsongpeenong (Thailand) by decision after 5R at the Mediolanum Forum in Mirano, Italy. After this bout, he had been certified as "in recess".
5	(Thailand) Kompetlek Lookprabaht	December 5, 2015	2016	?	0
Kompetlek defeated Matheus Pereira (Brazil) by unanimous decision (49-48/49-48/49-48) after 5R at the Siam Oamnoi Boxing Stadium in Krathum Baen, Samut Sakhon, Thailand.
6	(Thailand) Noppakrit Gor Kampanart	August 23, 2018	February 1, 2019	162	0
Noppakrit defeated Anthony Ford (Canada) by decision after 5R at "Best Of Siam XIII" at Rajadamnern Stadium in Bangkok, Thailand, and he won the vacant title. Originally, he was going to fight against Manaowan Sitsongpeenong (Thailand) who was former WBC Muaythai welterweight champion.
7	(Thailand) Satanfah Rachanon	September 9, 2019	February 23, 2020	167	0
Satanfah defeated Chadd Collins by decision after 5R in Bangkok, Thailand to win the title.
8	(Thailand) Yodwicha Banchamek	February 23, 2020	2021	366	0
Banchamek defeated Satanfah Rachanon (Thailand) by a knockout in the 2R at Authentic Mix Martial Arts in Phuket, Thailand.
9	(Norway) Niclas Larsen	December 11, 2021	2022	365	0
Larsen defeated Valentin Thibaut (France) by decision in Køge, Denmark.
10	(France) Dylan Salvador	December 20, 2025	Current	332	0
Dylan Salvador defeated Kongjak PorPaoin (Thailand) by after 5R in Lyon, France to win the title.

== Welterweight ==
Weight limit: 147 lb (66.7 kg)

No.	Name	Date winning	Date losing	Days	Defenses
`1	(Thailand) Noppadeth II Chuwatthana	December 2, 2006	August 4, 2008	611	0
Noppadeth II defeated Leroy Beck (Denmark) by decision after 5R at after 5R at Vejlby-Risskov Hallen in Aarhus, Denmark.
2	(Thailand) Big Ben Chor Praram VI	August 4, 2008	June 9, 2012	1405	3
Big Ben defeated Noppadeth Chuwatthana II (Thailand) by unanimous decision (49-47/50-47/49-47) after 5R at Rajdamnern Stadium in Bangkok, Thailand. Big Ben defeated Singyok Sor. Sisan (Thailand) by unanimous decision (50-47/50-47/50-46) after 5R at Rajdamnern Stadium in Bangkok, Thailand on September 21, 2009, and he retained his title(1). Big Ben defeated Lomisan Sor. Chokkitchai (Thailand) by KO at 1R at National Stadium in Bangkok, Thailand on November 4, 2011, and he retained his title(2).
3	(France) Fabio Pinca	June 9, 2012	2015	?	0
Pinca defeated Big Ben Chor Praram 6 (Thailand) by the unanimous decision (49-48/49-48/47-48) after 5R at Impact Exhibition and Convention Center in Muang Thong Thani, Pak Kret, Nonthaburi, Thailand. After this bout, he had been certified as "in recess" for few years
4	(France) Mehdi Zatout	September 7, 2013	September 6, 2014	364	0
Zatout defeated Singmanee Kaewsamrit (Thailand) by unanimous decision (49-48/49-47/50-48) after 5R at Stade Volnay à Saint-Pierre in Réunion, France.
5	(United Kingdom) Liam Harrison	September 6, 2014	January 23, 2016	501	0
Harrison defeated Mehdi Zatout (France) by unanimous decision after 5R at the Liverpool Olympia in Liverpool, England, U.K.
6	(France) Morgan Adrar	January 23, 2016	January 28, 2017		0
Adrar defeated Mehdi Zatout (France) by decision after 5Rat Espace Sportif Maurice Nicod in Arbent, France. Originally, Adrar was going to fight against Liam Harrison (United Kingdom) who was the current champion.
7	(Thailand) Manaowan Sitsongpeenong	January 28, 2017	?	?	0
Manaowan defeated Morgan Adrar (France) by split decision (48-47/47-48/48-47) after 5R at Salle Espace Louis Simon de Gaillard in Gaillard, Haute-Savoie, France.
8	(Thailand) Buakiew Sitsongpeenong	February 27, 2018	?	?	0
Buakiew defeated Bobo Sacko (France) by TKO(Referee stoppage) at 4R at Rajdamnern Stadium in Bangkok, Thailand, and he won the vacant title.
9	(Thailand) Manachai	October 29, 2018	2019	?	0
Manachai defeated Julio Lobo (Brazil) by decision after 5R to win the title.
10	(Brazil) Luis Cajaiba	June 18, 2019	Vacated	166	0
Cajaiba defeated Chadd Collins (Australia) by decision at 5R at Lumpinee Stadium in Bangkok, Thailand, and he won the vacant title.
11	(Iran) Sajad Sattari	May 14, 2022	Vacated		0
Sajad defeated Julio Lobo (Brazil) by decision at 5R at Lumpinee Stadium in Bangkok, Thailand, and he won the vacant title.
12	(Republic of Ireland) Niall McGreevy	October 12, 2024	Current	766	1
McGreevy defeated Detchrit Sitsonpeenong (Thailand) by decision after 5R in Verona, Italy, to win the vacant title. McGreevy defeated Arjan Hajdari (Germany) by unanimous decision after 5R in Glasgow, United Kingdom, to defend his title.

== Super lightweight ==
Weight limit: 140 lb (63.5 kg)

No.	Name	Date winning	Date losing	Days	Defenses
1	(Thailand) Danthai Siangmanasak	September 17, 2006	November 28, 2009	1168	0
Danthai defeated Kieran Keddle (United Kingdom/ENG) by decision after 5R at Rivermead Leisure Complex and Gym in Reading, Berkshire, England, UK.
2	(France) Fabio Pinca	November 28, 2009	January 2012	?	0
Pinca defeated Danthai Siangmanasak (Thailand) by TKO at 3R at the Palais des Sports de Lyon Gerland in Lyon, Lyon Metropolis, France.
Interim	(Thailand) Sagetdao Petpayathai	October 21, 2011	January 2012	?	0
Sagetdao defeated Kevin Ross (United States) by TKO (Doctor Stoppage) at 3R 3:00 at Club Nokia in Los Angeles, California, United States.
3	(Thailand) Sagetdao Petpayathai	January 2012	November 15, 2014	?	1
Sagetdao was promoted to the regular champion in January 2012. Sagetdao defeated Sofiane Derdega (France) by TKO at 3R at Impact Exhibition and Convention Center in Muang Thong Thani, Pak Kret, Nonthaburi, Thailand on June 9, 2012, and he retained his title(1). Sagetdao defeated Tetsuya Yamato (Japan) by TKO (elbow strike) at 4R at San Manuel Indian Casino & Bingo in Highland, California, United States on May 16, 2013, and he retained his title(2).
Interim	(Thailand) Arannchai Kiatpatarapran	September 7, 2013	September 27, 2015	750	0
Arannchai defeated Kamel Jemel (France) by TKO at 3R at Stade Volnay à Saint-Pierre in Réunion, France, and he won the interim championship.
4	(Japan) Tetsuya Yamato	November 15, 2014	September 27, 2015	316	0
Yamato defeated Sagetdao Petpayathai (Thailand) by TKO (Doctor stoppage/nose injury by left elbow strike) at 3R 1:53 at Korakuen Hall in Bunkyo, Tokyo, Japan.
5	(Thailand) Arannchai Kiatpatarapran	September 27, 2015	May 27, 2016	243	0
Arannchai defeated Tetsuya Yamato (Japan), the current regular champion, by unanimou decision (50-46/50-45/49-47) after 5R at Korakuen Hall in Bunkyo, Tokyo, Japan, and he unified WBC Muaythai World Super lightweight championship.
6	(France) Rafi Bohic	May 27, 2016	Vacated	3826	0
Bohi defeated Arannchai Kiatpatarapran (Thailand) by split decision (49-48/47-48/48-49) after 5R at Rajdamnern Stadium in Bangkok, Thailand. After this bout he had been sanctioned as "champion in recess".
7	(Thailand) Saeksan Or. Kwanmuang	April 28, 2018	July 1, 2019	429	0
Seksan (aka Seksan Aor Kwanmuang) defeated Rodlek PK Seanchai (Thailand) by the unanimous decision after 5R at Patong Boxing Stadium in Phuket, Thailand.
8	(Republic of Ireland) Sean Clancy	July 20, 2019	2021	531	0
Clancy defeated Alessandro Sara (Italy) by a unanimous decision after 5R at Neptune Stadium in Cork, Ireland.
9	(United Kingdom) Nathan Bendon	Feb 12, 2022	Vacated		
Bendon defeated Adam Larfi (France) by the majority decision after 5R in Bolton, England.
10	(Australia) Chadd Collins	November 26, 2022			
Collins defeated Yod-IQ Sor.Thanaphet (Thailand) by a unanimous decision after 5R at in Melbourne, Australia.
11	(United Kingdom) Anthony Deary	August 2, 2025	Current		
Deary defeated Petchphuthai Sor Tawanabon (Thailand) by a KO (Elbow) after 1R at in Liverpool, United Kingdom.

== Lightweight ==
Weight limit: 135 lb (61.2 kg)

No.	Name	Date winning	Date losing	Days	Defenses
Interim	(Thailand) Kongpipop Petchyindee	November 29, 2007	2009	?	?
Kongpipob defeated Kamel Jemel (France) by TKO(Doctor stoppage: cut) with left elbow strike at 1R at Stade Pierre de Coubertin in Paris, France.By July 2008 primary title is vacant.
Interim	(Thailand) Jaroenchai Aoodonmuang	August 21, 2010	Vacated	?	0
Jaroenchai defeated Hiromasa Masuda (Japan) by split decision 2-1 after 5R at Haikou City Stadium in Haikou, Hainan, China. At least, he has been sanctioned as the interim champion until January 2012.Held interim title for 2011. Vacant by 2012
1	(Thailand) Jomthong Chuwattana	November 4, 2011	Vacated	1366	1
Jomthong defeated Hiromasa Masuda (Japan) by TKO(Referee stoppage:punches) at 2R at Nimibutr Stadium of National Stadium in Bangkok, Thailand. Jomthong defeated Yetkin Özkul (Turkey) by the unanimous decision (50-46/50-46/50-46) after 5R at Impact Exhibition and Convention Center in Muang Thong Thani, Pak Kret, Nonthaburi, Thailand, and he retained his title(1). At least, he had been sanctioned as the regular champion until June 2015. He had been sanctioned as "champion in recess" from August 2015 until January 2016
2	(Thailand) Panpayak Sitchefboontham	February 23, 2017	?	?	1
Panpayak defeated Phoneak Mor.Phuwana (Thailand) by the unanimous decision (49-48/49-48/49-47) after 5R at Rajadamnern Stadium in Bangkok, Thailand
3	(Cyprus) Savvas Michael	December 27, 2019	366	Vacated?	0
Michael defeated Dennanpho Sor Thanyaluk (Thailand) by a TKO in 4R at the Lumpinee Stadium in Bangkok, Thailand.
4	(Italy) Luca Falco	July 30, 2022			
Michael defeated Isaac Araya (Spain) by a TKO in 3R in Sorrento, Italy.
5	(Japan) Shimon Yoshinari	October 5, 2025	408	Current	0
Yoshinari defeated Neungphusing Kor. Wuttichai. (Thailand) by KO in 1R at the Lumpinee Stadium in Yokosuka, Japan, to win the title.

== Super featherweight ==
Weight limit: 130 lb (59.0 kg)

No.	Name	Date winning	Date losing	Days	Defenses
1	(Thailand) Kaew Fairtex	January 28, 2006	March 2010	?	1
Kaew defeated In-Wook Bin (South Korea) by TKO(Refedee stoppage : Right elbow strike) at 4R at Plaza de Toros in Cancun, Mexico, and he won the title. Kaew defeated Genki Yamamoto (Japan) by the unanimou decision (50-47/49-46/50-45) after 5R at Normandie Casino in Gardena, California, United States on September 8, 2009. He was sanctioned as the regular champion until September 2009.
2	(Thailand) Kompetlek Lookprabaht	January 2, 2010	?	?	0
Kompetlek defeated Yetkin Özkul (Turkey) by decision after 5R at the Theatre Arena of Mike's Shopping Mall in Pattaya, Thailand.
3	(Thailand) Jomthong Chuwattana	July 14, 2011	2011	?	0
Jomthong defeated Petek Ekbangsai or written as Phetaik Kiatyongyuth (Thailand) by decision after 5R at Rajadamnern Stadium in Bangkok, Thailand.
4	(Thailand) Kongsayarm Tor-Pitakchai	November 4, 2011		?	0
Kongsayarm defeated Saengmorakot Chuwattana (Thailand) by decision after 5R at Nimibutr Stadium of National Stadium in Bangkok, Thailand. At least, he was sanctioned as the champion until January 2012
5	(Thailand) Kaimukkao Por.Thairongruangkamai	July 5, 2012	January 2013	?	0
Kaimukkaow defeated Eaklith Mor Krunthepthonburi (Thailand) by KO at 5R at Rajadamnern Stadium in Bangkok, Thailand, and he won both of WBC and Rajadamnern Stadium Super featherweight title. At least, he was sanctioned as the champion until January 2013.
6	(Japan) Genji Umeno	November 15, 2014	June 2018	?	2
Umeno defeated Jompitchit Chuwattana (Thailand) by the unanimous decision (50-45/50-47/49-47) after 5R at Korakuen Hall in Bunkyo, Tokyo, Japan. Umeno defeated Pethboonchu Sor.sommai by KO with right upper cut at 3R 2:13 Korakuen Hall in Bunkyo, Tokyo, Japan, on July 20, 2015. Umeno was sanctioned as succeeding defending his title(1) before the bout had been started because Pethboonchu failed to pass weighing. Pethboonchu's weight was 60.80kg at the first weighing, and it was heavier than the limit 2kg. He failed the second weight in 2 hours later. The bout was handicapped match that Pethboonchu was deducted his point -1 and forced to wear 10 oz gloves. Umeno defeated Keith McLachlan (United Kingdom) by TKO (Referee stoppage : Punches) at 2R 0:34 at Korakuen Hall in Bunkyo, Tokyo, Japan. In June 2018, Umeno announced that he returns his WBC Muaythai title because he cannot defend his title against Superlek Mor Rattanabundit the interim champion within 3 months due to the plan of the rematch against Kulapdum Sor.Jor.Piek-Uthai.
Interim	(Thailand) Superlek Mor Rattanabundit	September 23, 2016	June 2018	?	0
Superlek defeated Saeksan Or. Kwanmuang (Thailand) by decision after 5R at Lumpinee Stadium in Bangkok, Thailand.
7	(Thailand) Superlek Mor Rattanabundit	June 2018	Vacated	?	0
Superlek got promoted to the regular champion because Umeno returned his title.
8	(Thailand) Samingdet Nor.Anuwatgym	September 18, 2020	Vacated	?	0
Samingdet defeated Dechsakda Sor-Jor Tongprajin (Thailand) by knockout after 3R at Rangsit Stadium in Rangsit, Thailand to win the title.
9	(Vietnam) Minh Phat Truong	November 19, 2023	Vacated	317	0
Truong defeated Mostfa Armand (Iran) to win the title.
10	(Thailand) YodPT Petchrungruang	October 12, 2024	Vacated	365	0
Petchrungruang defeated Kiewpayak Jitmuangnon (Thailand) by knockout after 4R in Verona, Italy to win the title.
11	(Thailand) Chaila Por Lakboon	December 2, 2025	Current	350	
Lakboon defeated Josh McCulloch (Australia) by decision (unanimous) in Bangkok, Thailand to win the title.

== Featherweight ==
Weight limit: 126 lb (57.2 kg)

No.	Name	Date winning	Date losing	Days	Defenses
1	(Thailand) Anuwat Kaewsamrit	October 19, 2006	July 31, 2008	651	0
Anuwat defeated Singtongnoi Por Telakun (Thailand) by TKO(Referee stoppage: Right cross) at 3R at Rajadamnern Stadium in Bangkok, Thailand.
2	(Thailand) Jomthong Chuwattana	July 31, 2008	2011	1127	2
Jomthong defeated Anuwat Kaewsamrit (Thailand) by the unanimous decision (47-49/47-49/47-49) after 5R at Rajadamnern Stadium in Bangkok, Thailand. Jomthong defeated Albert veera Chey (France) by decision after 5R at the Palais des Sports de Lyon Gerland in Lyon, Lyon Metropolis, France, on November 28, 2009, and he retained his title. Jomthong defeated Nong-O Kaiyanghadaogym (Thailand) by decision after 5R at Rajadamnern Stadium in Bangkok, Thailand on May 26, 2011, and he retained his title. Vacant by September in 2011.
3	(France) Hakim Hamech	September 20, 2014	Vacated	?	0
Hamech defeated Chaichana (Thailand) by KO (Knee shot to liver) at 1R at Palais des Sports de St Fons in Saint-Fons, Auvergne-Rhône-Alpes, France. On February 27, 2018, there was going to be held the bout for the vacant championship between Elias Mahmoudi (France) vs. Rungkao Petchyindee (Thailand) at Lumpinee Stadium in Bangkok, Thailand, but it was changed to "non-title bout" because Mahmoudi failed to make the 126lbs weight limit. WBC Muaythai announced that "only Rungkaao can become champion" at first, but it had been changed. In addition, originally Pakkalek Tor Laksong (Thailand) was going to fight instead of Rungkao. Runkao won the bout but for unknown reasons was never listed as champion.
4	(Thailand) Petchdam Petchyindee Academy	May 10, 2018	May 10, 2019	365	0
Petchdam defeated Rungkit MorBeskamala (Thailand) by decision after 5R at Rajadamnern Stadium in Bangkok, Thailand.
5	(France) Darren Rolland	August 1, 2019	???	519	0
Rolland defeated Carlos Coello (Spain) by a 2R knockout during Cadiz Fight Night 2 in Cadiz, Spain.
6	(Spain) Antonio Orden	July 7, 2022	June 6, 2025	1065	1
Orden defeated Noelisson Silva (Brazil) by decision after 5R during Extreme Fighters in Madrid, Spain to win the title.Orden defeated Nicolas Christou (Cyprus) by decision after 5R during Extreme Fighters in Madrid, Spain to defend the title.
7	(Japan) Takuma Ota	June 6, 2025	February 22, 2026	261	0
Ota defeated Champion Antonio Orden (Spain) by a 3R knockout during NJKF King of Challenger in Tokyo, Japan.
8	(Spain) Antonio Orden	February 22, 2026	Current	268	0
Orden defeated Takuma Ota (Japan) by decision (Unanimous) after 5R in Madrid, Spain to win the title.

== Super bantamweight ==
Weight limit: 122 lb (55.3 kg)

No.	Name	Date winning	Date losing	Days	Defenses
1	(Thailand) Khaimookdam Chuwattana	November 4, 2011	June 2014	?	2
Khaimookdam defeated Kunitaka Fujiwara (Japan) by the unanimous decision (50-45/50-46/50-47) after 5R at Nimibutr Stadium of National Stadium in Bangkok, Thailand. Khaimookdam defeated Methawin Kiatyongyut (Thailand) by decision after 5R at Rajadamnern Stadium in Bangkok, Thailand on January 25, 2012, and he retained his title(1) and he won the vacant title of Rajadamnern Stadium Super bantamweight. At least, he was sanctioned as the regular champion until June 2014.
2	(Thailand) Jomhod Eminentair	May 16, 2013	?	?	0
Jomhod defeated Romie Adanza by TKO(Cut) at 1R at San Manuel Indian Casino & Bingo in Highland, California, United States.
3	(Thailand) Pateng Kiatponthip	July 5, 2015	Febaruary 2017	?	0
Pateng defeated Kunitaka Fujiwara (Japan) by KO with jumping right knee shot at 3R 0:57 at Hall of Appla Takaishi in Takaishi, Osaka, Japan.
Interim	(Italy) Joseph Lasiri	February 18, 2017	Former (Interim)		0
Lasiri defeated Mohamed Bouchareb (France) by decision after 5R at Palazzetto dello Sport in Monza, Italy.
4	(Japan) Asahi Shinagawa	February 9, 2020	February 2022	2473	0
Shinagawa defeated (Thailand) Sing-Udon Aor.Aood-Udon by a 2R KO in Tokyo, Japan, to win the title.
5	(Republic of Ireland) Ryan Sheehan	April 23, 2022	Vacated	365	0
Sheehan defeated Jomhod Eminentair (Thailand) by split decision in Cork, Ireland to win the title.
6	(Thailand) Saoek Sitchefboontham	December 12, 2025	Current	340	0
Sitchefboontham defeated Yokmorakot Wor Sungprapai(Thailand) by decision (Unanimous) after 5R in Bangkok, Thailand to win the title.

== Bantamweight ==
Weight limit: 118 lb (53.5 kg)

No.	Name	Date winning	Date losing	Days	Defenses
1	(Thailand) Kaiyasit Chuwattana	July 31, 2008	?	?	0
Kaiyasit defeated Dawsaming Ingram-Gym (Thailand) by the unanimous decision (49-47/49-47/50-47) after 5R at Rajadamnern Stadium in Bangkok, Thailand, and he also retained his Rajadamnern Stadium Bantamweight title.
2	(United Kingdom) Andy Howson	September 9, 2014	February 2016	664	0
Howson defeated Mohamed Bouchareb (France) by the unanimous decision (50-47/50-46/50-46) after 5R at the Liverpool Olympia in Liverpool, England, U.K. At least, he was sanctioned as the regular champion until February 2016.
3	(Thailand) Nongyut Sitjaekan	June 7, 2018	?	?	0
Nongyut defeated Theptaksin Sor Sornsing (Thailand) by the unanimous decision (47-49/47-49/47-49) after 5R at Rajadamnern Stadium in Bangkok, Thailand.
4	(Thailand) Kumandoi Petcharoenvit	December 13, 2018	???	?	0
Kumandoi defeated Thailand Kumangoen Jitmuangnon (Thailand) by unanimous decision after 5R at Rajadamnern Stadium in Bangkok, Thailand.
5	(Belgium) Gianny De Leu	April 25, 2026	Current	206	0
De Leu defeated Fergus Smith (United Kingdom) by unanimous decision after 5R in Ninove, Belgium.

== Super flyweight ==
Weight limit: 115 lb (52.2 kg)

No.	Name	Date winning	Date losing	Days	Defenses
1	(Thailand) Jomhod Eminentair	May 16, 2013	January 1, 2014	230	0
Praewpao defeated Romie Adanza (United States) by TKO (Referee stpppage: Cut) at 1R at in Highland, California, United States.
2	(Thailand) Petchthailand Moopingaroijung	August 9, 2019	Vacated	480	0
Praewpao defeated Issei Ishii (Japan) by Decision (Unanimous) after 5R at the Lumpinee Stadium in Bangkok, Thailand.
3	(Japan) Issei Ishii	September 23, 2022	Vacated		
Ishi defeated Detchphet Wor.Sangprapai (Thailand) by KO (Left Hook) after 1R in Tokyo, Japan.
4	(Algeria) Yonis Anane	April 23, 2024	Vacated		
Anane defeated Kongsaklek SitKongSiam (Thailand) by KO after 2R at the Rajadamnern Stadium in Bangkok, Thailand.

== Flyweight ==
Weight limit: 112 lb (50.8 kg)

No.	Name	Date winning	Date losing	Days	Defenses
1	(Japan) Ryuya Okuwaki	September 7, 2024	Current	802	2
Okuwaki defeated Sivarat Wor.Rinthida (Thailand) by KO at 1R in Yokohama, Japan to win the title. Okuwaki defeated Waewwaow Wor.Wangprom (Thailand) by Decision at 5R in Yokosuka, Japan to defend the title.Okuwaki defeated Detchpichai Navyandaman (Thailand) by split decision in Yokohama, Japan to defend the title.

== Light flyweight ==
Weight limit: 108 lb (49.0 kg)

No.	Name	Date winning	Date losing	Days	Defenses
1	(Thailand) Praewprao PetchyindeeAcademy	May 9, 2018	Vacated	1241	1
Praewpao defeated Sangfah Nor Anuwatgym (Thailand) by TKO (Referee stpppage: Cut) at 4R at Rajadamnern Stadium in Bangkok, Thailand, and to win the title. "XCIX" is pronounced as "gaao-sip-gaao" in Thai. Praepao defeated a unknown opponent December 7, 2019 to defend his belt. Title vacant by October 2021

== Mini flyweight ==
Weight limit: 105 lb (47.6 kg)

No.	Name	Date winning	Date losing	Days	Defenses
1	(Thailand) Nungkongjiam Kiatsombat	July 14, 2011	January 2013	537	1
Nungkongjiam defeated Jompet Chuwattana (Thailand) by decision after 5R at Rajadamnern Stadium in Bangkok, Thailand. Nungkongjiam defeated Singto Parnsomboon (Thailand) by decision after 5R at Nimibutr Stadium of National Stadium in Bangkok, Thailand on November 7, 2011, and he retained is title(1). At least, he was sanctioned as the regular champion until January 2013.
2	(Thailand) Nichaoew Suwitgym	January 5, 2013	November 2013	269	0
Nichaoew defeated Raktemroi Visutchatoenyont (Thailand) by decision after 5R at Khlong Prao Festival Grounds in Ko Chang, Trat Province, Thailand. At least, he was sanctioned as the regular champion until November 2013.
3	(Japan) Nadaka Eiwasports	April 8, 2018	Vacated	365	0
Nadaka defeated Tuantong Singmanee (Thailand) by a unanimous decision (50-45/49-46/50-44) after 5R at Differ Ariake in Koto, Tokyo, Japan.
4	(Thailand) Petchdet Wor.Sangprapai	July 2, 2019	Vacated	883	0?
Petchdet defeated Ryuya Okuwaki (Japan) by a unanimous decision (49-48, 48-48, 49-48) in Tokyo, Japan.Listed to have defended the belt December 8, 2020 but no sources about the fight. champion till 2021 December.
5	(Japan) Homura Abe	October 4, 2025	Current	409	1
Abe defeated Yim Siam Sor Chokmeechai (Thailand) by KO (Right Elbow) after 2R in Yokosuka, Japan. Abe defeated Yodmanee Suwanjakkafe (Thailand) by KO (Body punches) in 2R in Yokohama, Japan on April 5, 2026.

== See also ==
- List of IBF Muaythai world champions
- List of WBC Muaythai diamond champions
- List of WBC Muaythai female world champions
- List of WBC Muaythai international champions
- List of WBC Muaythai female international champions
- List of WBC Muaythai international challenge winners
- List of WBC Muaythai female international challenge winners
