= List of WBC Muaythai female international challenge winners =

This is a list of WBC Muaythai female international challenge winners, showing every female "international challenge" match winner certificated by the World Boxing Council Muaythai (WBC Muaythai). The WBC, which is one of the four major governing bodies in professional boxing, started certifying their own Muay Thai world champions in 19 different weight classes in 2005.

The international challenge matches are for the competitors who are not qualified for the official championships, therefore it is not championship. In addition, it is completely different from "international championships". The winners of international challenge matches are given commemorative belts.

== Super bantamweight ==
No.	Name	Date winning
	(Thailand) Saifah S Suparat	May 8, 2015
Saifah defeated Teresa Wintermyr (Sweden) by unanimous decision (49-47/50-47/49-47) after 5R in Chiang Dao District, Chiang Mai Province, Thailand.

== Super flyweight ==
No.	Name	Date winning
	(United Kingdom) (England) Grace Ann Spicer	November 8, 2014
Spicer defeated Ariana Santos (Portugal) by unanimous decision after 5R at "Muaythai Mayhem" at Copthorne Hotel Effingham in Copthorne, England, UK.

== See also ==
- List of WBC Muaythai diamond champions
- List of WBC Muaythai female world champions
- List of WBC Muaythai female international champions
- List of WBC Muaythai international challenge winners
