= Luke Turner =

Luke Turner may refer to:

== Artists ==
- Luke Turner, founder of UK pop culture and music magazine The Quietus
- Luke Turner, UK artist member of LaBeouf, Rönkkö & Turner

== Sportsmen ==
- Luke Turner (footballer) (born 2002), Irish centreback soccer player
- Luke Turner (running back), U.S. college American football player at Rice University; MVP of the 2013 Conference USA Football Championship Game
- Luke Turner, Australian lifeguard silver medalist in Lifesaving at the 2001 World Games
- Luke Turner, British muay thai champion; see List of WBC Muaythai European champions

== See also ==
- Turner (disambiguation)
- Luke (disambiguation)
