= List of WBC Muaythai international champions =

This is a list of WBC Muaythai international champions, showing every international champion certificated by the World Boxing Council Muaythai (WBC Muaythai). The WBC, which is one of the four major governing bodies in professional boxing, started certifying their own Muay Thai world champions in 19 different weight classes in 2005.

== Super heavyweight ==
| No. | Name | Date winning | Date losing | Days | Defenses |
|---|---|---|---|---|---|
| | (United States) Steve Banks | December 18, 2010 | ? | ? | ? |
Banks defeated Eduardo Maiorino (Eduardo Maiorino de Morais/Brazil) by TKO at 2R at "Dragon Boxing International Professional Boxing Championship" at Haikou City Stadium in Haikou, Hainan, China.

== Heavyweight ==
| No. | Name | Date winning | Date losing | Days | Defenses |
|---|---|---|---|---|---|
| | (China) Qing Jun Zhang | September 9, 2005 | ? | ? | ? |
Zhang defeated Marek Boguscewicz (United Kingdom/England) by KO at 1R at "Xplosion Hong Kong 2005" at the Elizabeth Stadium in Hong Kong, and he won the vacant title
| Interim | (Netherlands) Ricardo Van de Boss | January 13, 2007 | January 2, 2010 | 1085 | 2 |
Van de Boss defeated Malex Gadzhiev (Russia) by split decision after 5R at Thepprasit Boxing Stadium in Pattaya, Thailand, and he won the interim title On January 4, 2008, Van de Boss defeated Tomasz Wozack (Poland) by unnanimous decision (48-46/48-46/47-46) after 5R at Fairtex Stadium in Pattaya, Thailand, and he retained his title(1). On January 2, 2009, Van de Boss defeated Abbas Astraki (Iran) by KO at 3R at Mike's Shopping Mall in Pattaya, Thailand, and he retained his title(2)
| | (Sudan) Faisal Zakaria | January 2, 2010 | ? | ? | ? |
Zakaria defeated Ricardo Van de Boss (Netherlands) by decision after 5R in Pattaya, Thailand, and he won Van de Boss's title.

== Super cruiserweight ==
| No. | Name | Date winning | Date losing | Days | Defenses |

== Cruiserweight ==
| No. | Name | Date winning | Date losing | Days | Defenses |
|---|---|---|---|---|---|
| | (Australia) Charles August | May 9, 2009 | ? | ? | ? |
August defeated Seyed Razi Jabbari (Iran/Philippines) by unanimous decision after 5R at WA Italian Club in Perth, Western Australia, and he wpn the vacant title.

== Light heavyweight ==
| No. | Name | Date winning | Date losing | Days | Defenses |
| | (Australia) Jake Lund | July 21, 2019 | ? | ? | ? |

== Super middleweight ==
| No. | Name | Date winning | Date losing | Days | Defenses |
|---|---|---|---|---|---|
| | (Slovenia) Ota Merling | December 2, 2006 | ? | ? | ? |
Merling defeated Henrik Nyegaard by decision at Vejlby-Risskov Hallen in Aarhus, Denmark, and he won the vacant title.
The result of bout between Alain Sylvester (Canada) and Alex Lim (Malaysia) is unknown.
| | (Uganda) Umar Semata | June 14, 2013 | ? | ? | ? |
Semata defeated Rhys Karakriacos (Australia) by unanimous decision (50-47/50-45/49-45) after 5R at "Rwenzori Boxing Gala 2013" at Kyadondo Rugby Club in Kampala, Uganda.

== Middleweight ==
| No. | Name | Date winning | Date losing | Days | Defenses |
|---|---|---|---|---|---|
| | (Denmark) Ali Chahour | December 2, 2006 | ? | ? | ? |
Chahour defeated Yama Mustafa (Netherlands) by TKO at 5R at Vejlby-Risskov Hallen in Aarhus, Denmark, and he won the vacant title. Originally, WBC announced that Chahour was going to fight against Jan De Keyzer (Belgium).
On May 17, 2008, Dusan Salva vs. Edwin Samy was ended as draw by split decision 1-1（48-48/48-50/50-48） after 5R at "Battle Collossal VI" at WA Italian Club in Perth, Western Australia
| | (Australia) Dusan Salva | August 30, 2008 | ? | ? | 1 |
Salva defeated Edwin Samy (New Zealand) by unanimous decision after 5R at "Battle Collossal IV" at WA Italian Club in Perth, Western Australia, and he won the vacant title. On May 9, 2009, Salva defeated Shannan Foreman (New Zealand) by unanimous decision after 5R at "Battle Collossal VI" at WA Italian Club in Perth, Western Australia, and he retained his title(1).
| | (United Kingdom) Josh Hill (kickboxer) | 2024 | ? | ? | ? |
Hill defeated Jonathan Mayezo (France) by decision.

== Super welterweight ==
| No. | Name | Date winning | Date losing | Days | Defenses |
|---|---|---|---|---|---|
| | (Japan) Soichiro Miyakoshi | November 15, 2015 | ? | ? | 0 |
Miyakoshi defeated Adyl Khoja (France) by unanimous decision (49-47/50-47/50-47) after 5R at Korakuen Hall in Bunkyo, Tokyo, Japan, and he won the vacant title.

== Welterweight ==
| No. | Name | Date winning | Date losing | Days | Defenses |
|---|---|---|---|---|---|
| | (United Kingdom) (England) Liam Harrison | July 23, 2011 | ? | ? | ? |
Harrison defeated Justin Greskiewicz (United States) by TKO(referee stoppage) at 2R 3:00 at Robert J. Collins Arena at "Warriors Cup XII" in Lincroft, New Jersey, United States, and he won the vacant title.
| | (Sweden) Sammon Decker (Samuel Bark) | November 27, 2016 | ? | ? | ? |
Decker defeated Kenta Yamada (Japan) by unanimous decision (49-48/49-48/49-47) after 5R at Korakuen Hall in Bunkyo, Tokyo, Japan, and he won the vacant title.

== Super lightweight ==
| No. | Name | Date winning | Date losing | Days | Defenses |
|---|---|---|---|---|---|
| | (Denmark) Ashley Beck | December 5, 2006 | ? | ? | ? |
Beck defeated Danny Brown (United Kingdom/England) by TKO at 2R at Vejlby-Risskov Hallen in Aarhus, Denmark, and he won the vacant title.
| | (China) En Kang | January 18, 2009 | August 30, 2009 | 224 | 0 |
Kang defeated Kevin Ross (United States) by unanimous decision (49-47/49-45/50-47) after 5R at "Hero Legend" at National Olympic Sports Center in Beijing, China, and he won the vacant title.
| | (United States) Kevin Ross | August 30, 2009 | ? | ? | 1 |
Ross defeated En Kang (China) by TKO(Right knee strike to left chin) at 4R 1:03 at "World Championship Muay Thai" at Las Vegas Hilton in Las Vegas, Nevada, United States, and he won Kang's title. On May 14, 2011, Ross defeated Mark DeLuca (United States) by TKO(Doctor stoppage:cut on lip) at 3R 3:00 at the Star of the Desert Arena at Buffalo Bill's Casino in Primm, Nevada, United States, and he retained his title(1).
| | (Japan) Tetsuya Yamato (Testuya Iwashita) | September 22, 2012 | ? | ? | 1 |
Yamato defeated Paul Karpowicz (United Kingdom) by unanimous decision (48-47/49-48/50-48) after 5R at Korakuen Hall in Bunkyo, Tokyo, Japan, and he won the vacant title. Originally, he was going to fight against Leo Monteiro (Brazil), but it had been changed because he could not get viza。 On February 16, 2014, Yamato defeated Masaaki Noiri (Japan) by unanimous decision (49-47/50-47/49-48) after 5R at Korakuen Hall in Bunkyo, Tokyo, Japan, and he retained his title(1).
| | (Japan) Taeyon（Katsushi Nakagawa） | July 23, 2016 | ? | ? | ? |
Taeyon (or Tae Yeon or Teyon) defeated Mathias 7 MuayThai (Mathias Gallo Cassarino/Italy) by split decision (49-48/48-49/49-48) after 5R at Differ Ariake in Koto, Tokyo, Japan, and he won the vacant title.

== Lightweight ==
| No. | Name | Date winning | Date losing | Days | Defenses |
|---|---|---|---|---|---|
| | (Japan) Keijiro Miyakoshi | November 15, 2015 | ? | ? | 0 |
Miyakoshi defeated Pau Illana Gazquez (Spain) by KO (Right cross) at 3R 3:04 at Korakuen Hall in Bunkyo, Tokyo, Japan, and he won the vacant title.

== Super featherweight ==
| No. | Name | Date winning | Date losing | Days | Defenses |
|---|---|---|---|---|---|
| | (Japan) Genji Umeno (Kenta Umeno) | April 13, 2014 | ? | ? | 0 |
Umeno defeated Stephen Meleady (Ireland) by unanimous decision (50-47/50-46/50-46) after 5R at Korakuen Hall in Bunkyo, Tokyo, Japan, and he won the vacant title。
| | (United Kingdom) (Scotland) Keith McLachlan | March 26, 2016 | ? | ? | ? |
McLachlan defeated Aaron O'Callaghan (Ireland) by unanimous decision (46-50/46-50/45-50) after 5R at "Muay Thai Boxing" at On-X Arena in Linwood, Scotland, UK, and he won the vacant title.
| | (United Kingdom) (England) Jonathan Haggerty | May 26, 2018 | Current | 3087 | 0 |
Haggerty defeated Issac Araya (Spain) by TKO (forfeit) at 2R at Copthorne Hotel Effingham Gatwick in Copthorne, England, UK, and he won the vacant title.

== Featherweight ==
| No. | Name | Date winning | Date losing | Days | Defenses |
|---|---|---|---|---|---|
| | (United States) Romie Kris Adanza | June 26, 2011 | ? | ? | ? |
Adanza defeated Haigang Huang (China) by decision after 5R at "Shandong Haohan Huanqiu Kung Fu Championship Battle 4" in Manila, Philippines, and he won the vacant title.
| | (Republic of Ireland) James E. O'Connell | June 25, 2016 | ? | ? | 1 |
O'Connell defeated Tam McCourt (United Kingdom/Scotland) by decision after 5R at "The Clydebank BLITZ 3" at Playdrome Clydebank in Clydebank, Scotland, UK, and he won the vacant title. On October 22, O'Connell defeated Aaron O'Callaghan (Ireland) by unanimous decision after 5R at "Siam Warriors Superfights: Ireland v Japan" at Neptune Stadium in Cork, Ireland, and he retained his title(1). He also retained his ISKA Irish title, and he won and unified O'Callaghan's ISKA Muaythai European Featherweight title.
| | (Spain) Carlos 7Muaythai (Carlos Coello Canales) | December 17, 2016 | June 18, 2017 | 183 | 1 |
Canales defeated Nelson Fortes Moreira (Portugal) by decision after 5R, and he won the vacant title at "Nitroboxing El Retorno" at Sala Momart Theatre in Cádiz, Spain
| | (Japan) Momotaro (Kohei Kodera) | June 18, 2017 | ? | ? | ? |
Kodera defeated Carlos 7Muaythai (Carlos Coello Canales/Spain) by KO with left cross at 2R 2:04 at Korakuen Hall in Bunkyo, Tokyo, Japan, and he won Carlos's title.

== Super bantamweight ==
| No. | Name | Date winning | Date losing | Days | Defenses |
|---|---|---|---|---|---|
| | (Japan) Kunitaka (Kunitaka Fujiwara) | December 5, 2009 | ? | 2014? | 2 |
Kunitaka defeated Romie Kris Adanza (United States) by TKO (Cut by elbow strike) at 4R 2:23 at Buffalo Bill's Resort & Casino in Primm, Nevada, United States, and he won the title. On September 26, 2010, Kunitaka defeated Ning Li (China) by TKO (Illegal act) at 4R 1:19 at Korakuen Hall in Bunkyo, Tokyo, Japan, and he retained his title(1). As soon as after Ning's staff touched him when he was knocked down by at left body shot at 4R, the referee stopped the bout as it was an illegal act. On July 21, 2014, Kunitaka defeated Keisuke Miyamoto (Japan) by split decision (50-49/48-49/49-48) after 5R at Korakuen Hall in Bunkyo, Tokyo, Japan, and he retained his title(2).
| | (Japan) Keisuke Miyamoto | September 27, 2015 | ? | ? | ? |
Miyamoto defeated Alexis Barateau (France) by KO with bodyshots at 2R 3:04 at Korakuen Hall in Bunkyo, Tokyo, Japan, and he won the vacant tile.

== Bantamweight ==
| No. | Name | Date winning | Date losing | Days | Defenses |
|---|---|---|---|---|---|
| | (United Kingdom) (England) Dale White | December 2, 2006 | ? | ? | ? |
White defeated Sébastien Ocana (France) by decision at Vejlby-Risskov Hallen in Aarhus, Denmark, and he won the vacant title. Originally, WBC announced that Dale White was going to fight against Mohammed Bouchared (France).
| | (Belarus) (United States) Andrei Zayats | January 1, 2012 | ? | ? | ? |
Zayats defeated Wenhao Ji (China) by unanimous decision (45-49/45-48/46-48) after 5R at "Ultimate Fighter" at Changsha Sports Museum of Art, Central South University of Forestry and Technology in Changsha, Hunan, China.

== Super flyweight ==
| No. | Name | Date winning | Date losing | Days | Defenses |
|---|---|---|---|---|---|
| | (United States) Romie Kris Adanza | February 18, 2012 | ? | ? | ? |
Adanza defeated Tomonori Sato (Japan) by TKO (Referee Stoppage: Cut by left elbow strike) at 2R 0:19 at Korakuen Hall in Bunkyo, Tokyo, Japan, and he won the vacant tile.

== Flyweight ==
| No. | Name | Date winning | Date losing | Days | Defenses |
|---|---|---|---|---|---|
On March 18, 2012, Ngaoprajan Chuwattana (Thailand/Rajadamner studiam boxing champion) defeated Ryuji Kato (Japan/WBC Muaythai & WPMF Japanese champion) by unanimous decision (50-48/50-48/50-47) after 5R at Differ Ariake in Koto, Tokyo, Japan. Although the international championships are for the kickboxers except Thai kickboxers living in Thailand, this bout was sanctioned as the international championship due to few number of non-Thai kickboxers at this weight division. In addition, WBC Muaythai announced that the championship would be awarded only if Kato won this bout.
| Interim | (Japan) Ryuji Kato | December 23, 2013 | ? | ? | ? |
Kato defeated Tomonori Sato (Japan) by KO (Right back spin kick) at 2R 0:17 at Shinjuku Face in Shinjuku, Tokyo, Japan, and he won the vacant interim title.
| | (Japan) Tomonori (Tomonori Sato) | July 23, 2016 | ? | ? | 0 |
Tomonori defeated Siarhei Skiba (Belarus) by unanimous decision (49-47/49-47/50-47) after 5R at Differ Ariake in Koto, Tokyo, Japan, and he won the vacant title.

== Light flyweight ==
| No. | Name | Date winning | Date losing | Days | Defenses |

== Mini flyweight ==
| No. | Name | Date winning | Date losing | Days | Defenses |

== See also ==
- List of WBC Muaythai world champions
