= Hustler Casino =

Cardroom in Gardena, California

Coordinates: 33.891946°N 118.292826°W

- Interactive map of Larry Flynt's Hustler Casino
- Location: 1000 West Redondo Beach Boulevard Gardena, California 90247
- Opened: June 22, 2000
- Casino type: Land
- Owner: El Dorado LF, LLC.
- Previous names: El Dorado Club
- Renovated in: February 2007
- Website: https://www.hustlercasino.com/

Larry Flynt's Hustler Casino is a cardroom in Gardena, California, approximately 15 miles (25 km) south of Downtown Los Angeles. It is owned by El Dorado LF, LLC. the successor company after founder Larry Flynt's death. It has been in operation since June 22, 2000. Of all of Larry Flynt's businesses the Hustler Casino is the most profitable, earning over $20 million annually as of 2007. The Hustler Casino was built on land that was formerly occupied by the El Dorado Club, which Flynt purchased in 1998 for $8 million.

A major expansion was completed in February 2007 which included The Crystal Room which serves as a combination card room, special events room, conference room and poker tournament site.

Since 1997, Flynt has hosted "the biggest seven-card stud game in the world"; the game started at Flynt's home but moved to his casino when it opened. As of April 2007, the minimum buy-in is $200,000, with $1000 antes and stakes of $2,000–4,000. Unlike most high-stakes ring games, Flynt's game is held in a corner of the casino's main poker room floor. Regulars at the table include Phil Ivey, Barry Greenstein, and Ted Forrest. Another regular was Chip Reese before his death. The casino was featured in an episode of LA to Vegas, as a casino on the strip in Las Vegas.

In June 2016, the nearby Normandie Casino, was rebranded as Larry Flynt's Lucky Lady Casino due to the Miller family owners having had their gaming licenses revoked for anti–money laundering violations.
