= Ruth Ashdown =

English educator and retired Muay Thai fighting champion (born 1978)

- Born: 13 September 1978 (age 48); Crawley, England
- Height: 1.65 m (5 ft 5 in)
- Weight: 52 kg (115 lb; 8 st 3 lb)
- Division: Flyweight; Super-flyweight; Bantamweight; Super-bantamweight
- Style: Kickboxing; Muay Thai
- Stance: Orthodox
- Fighting out of: Crawley, England
- Team: Lumpini Crawley
- Trainer: John Jarvis
- Years active: 2007–2018

Kickboxing record
- Total: 35
- Wins: 25
- By knockout: 4
- Losses: 9
- By knockout: 1
- Draws: 1

Other information
- Occupation: Muay thai Coach and yoga instructor at Crawley Martial Arts Academy; WBC Muaythai European Representative
- Website: https://www.ruthashdown.com/

Ruth Ashdown (born 13 September 1978) is an English retired Muay Thai kickboxer who competed professionally from 2007 to 2018. She is the former WBC Muaythai world flyweight and super-bantamweight champion, as well as the former WBC Muaythai International and Diamond champion. She is one of just five diamond belt holders in the world.

Ashdown is the former World Muaythai Council European flyweight and the former International Combat Organisation Muay Thai champion. She is also the former ISKA Oriental Rules world flyweight champion, and IKF British Pro flyweight champion.

In 2018 the UK Muay Thai Awards voted her the Best Female Fighter of the Year, and in 2020 World Boxing Council inducted her into the Hall of Fame.

== Muay Thai career ==
Ruth Ashdown began her muay thai career in 2007, after she began training at the Lumpini Crawley gym. Her first title came in 2008, winning the IKF British flyweight title, after winning a split decision against Michelle Grizzle. After accumulating a 4–1 record, she was given an opportunity to fight for the WMC 118 lbs European title. She won the fight by unanimous decision.

Following this, she went 5-2-1, with her draw and one of her losses coming at the hands of the future WBC Muaythai European champion Soraya Bucherie. Following a two fight win streak, she was given a chance to fight for the ISKA World Oriental flyweight championship against Serrin Murray. Ashdown won a unanimous decision. This three fight win streak would earn her the chance to fight Ekaterina Vandaryeva for the ICO 118 lbs title. She won the title by a second-round TKO.

Her next fight was likewise for the title, this time for the WBC Muaythai 118 lbs International title, against Kate Stables. Ashdown won by a unanimous decision.

She next fought for the WBC Muaythai European title, in a rubber match Soraya Bucherie. Ashdown would lose by decision.

In 2013 she won her first world title, the WBC Muaythai 118 lbs belt, after defeating Lailla Akounad by way of TKO. She lost the title in her first title defense to Lena Ovchynnikova.

In 2016 she won a unanimous decision against Sveva Melillo to clinch her second world title, the WBC Muaythai 122 lbs championship.

Her last career fight was also her last title fight. In 2018 she fought Dokmaipa Kiatpompetch for the WBC Muaythai 122 lbs belt. Ashdown won her sixth major title, with a unanimous decision win over the Thai fighter.

Ruth Ashdown now runs Strong Yoga classes on Zoom and in Haywards Heath and Crawley and runs Thai Boxing classes and personal training in Haywards Heath.

== Championships and accomplishments ==
- International Kickboxing Federation
  - IKF Pro British flyweight championship
- World Muaythai Council
  - WMC European flyweight championship
- International Combat Organisation
  - ICO World flyweight championship
- International Sport Karate Association
  - ISKA World Oriental Rules flyweight championship
- World Boxing Council Muaythai
  - WBC Muaythai International flyweight championship
  - WBC Muaythai flyweight championship
  - WBC Muaythai super-bantamweight championship
  - WBC Muaythai Diamond super-bantamweight championship
  - WBC Hall of Fame Inductee
- UK Muay Thai Awards
  - 2018 Female Fighter of the Year

== Muay Thai record ==
Kickboxing record
25 wins (4 KOs), 9 losses, 1 draw
Date	Result	Opponent	Event	Location	Method	Round	Time	Record
2018-8-15	Win	Dokmaipa Kiatpompetch	WBC Diamond Belt	Hong Kong, China	Decision (Unanimous)	5	3:00	25-9-1
Wins WBC Muaythai Diamond Super Bantamweight Title.
2018-5-26	Win	Asia Walkorskia	Muaythai Mahyem	Copthorne, West Sussex, United Kingdom	TKO	3		24-9-1
2018-4-7	Win	Eva Schultz	Lion Fight 41	London, United Kingdom	Decision (Unanimous)	3	3:00	23-9-1
2017-9-3	Loss	Saskia D'Effremo	Road To Mayhem	London, United Kingdom	TKO	4		22-9-1
2017-5-4	Win	?	Samui International Muay Thai Stadium	Ko Samui, Thailand	Decision (Unanimous)	3	3:00	22-8-1
2017-3-4	Win	Cindy Silvestre	Pantheon Fight Series - Imperium	Hastings, United Kingdom	Decision (Unanimous)	3	3:00	21-8-1
2016-11-19	Win	Sveva Melillo	Muaythai Mayhem	Copthorne, West Sussex, United Kingdom	Decision (Unanimous)	5	3:00	20-8-1
Wins WBC Muaythai World Super Bantamweight Title.
2016-4-16	Win	Filipa Correia	Muaythai Mayhem	Copthorne, West Sussex, United Kingdom	Decision (Unanimous)	3	3:00	19-8-1
2015-11-21	Win	Gloria Peritore	Muaythai Mayhem	Copthorne, West Sussex, United Kingdom	Decision (Unanimous)	3	3:00	18-8-1
2015-7-19	Win	Meryem Uslu	Muaythai Mayhem	Copthorne, West Sussex, United Kingdom	Decision (Unanimous)	3	3:00	17-8-1
2015-6-4	Win	Nadia Grivas	X Posure Fight Series 1	Londres, United Kingdom	TKO	3		16-8-1
2014-11-8	Loss	Maria Lobo	Muaythai Mayhem	Copthorne, West Sussex, United Kingdom	Decision (Unanimous)	3	3:00	15-8-1
2014-7-19	Loss	Lena Ovchynnikova	Hot Summer Fights	Cabazon, United States	Decision (Unanimous)	3	3:00	15-7-1
Lost the WBC Muaythai Flyweight World Title.
2014-3-8	Loss	Patrizia Gibelli	Lion Belt Fight Night 4	Belfort, France	Decision (Unanimous)	3	3:00	15-6-1
2013-11-2	Win	Lailla Akounad	WBC hits the Millenium	Copthorne, West Sussex, United Kingdom	TKO	2		15-5-1
Wins the WBC Muaythai Flyweight World Title.
2013-6-22	Win	Estela Gil	Muaythai Mayhem	Copthorne, West Sussex, United Kingdom	Decision (Unanimous)	3	3:00	14-5-1
2013-5-25	Loss	Soraya Bucherie	One vs One	Trappes, France	Decision (Unanimous)	5	3:00	13-5-1
For the WBC Muaythai European Flyweight Title.
2013-3-9	Win	Kate Stables	Smash Muaythai 3	Liverpool, United Kingdom	Decision (Unanimous)	5	3:00	13-4-1
Wins the WBC Muaythai International Flyweight Title.
2012-11-3	Win	Ekaterina Vandaryeva	Muaythai Mayhem	Copthorne, West Sussex, United Kingdom	TKO	3		12-4-1
Wins the ICO Flyweight World Title.
2011-10-29	Win	Serin Murray	Newcastle Panthers	Newcastle, United Kingdom	Decision (Unanimous)	5	3:00	11-4-1
Wins the ISKA Oriental Flyweight World Title.
2011-8-13	Win	Daisy Breinburg	Muaythai Mayhem	Copthorne, West Sussex, United Kingdom	Decision (Unanimous)	3	3:00	10-4-1
2010-6-19	Win	Michelle Newall	The Ladykillers 4	Wythenshawe, United Kingdom	Decision (Unanimous)	3	3:00	9-4-1
2010-5-29	Loss	Soraya Bucherie	MSA Muay Thai Premier League	London, United Kingdom	Decision (Unanimous)	3	3:00	8-4-1
2010-5-1	Win	Cécile Gauthiere	Onesongchai Muay Thai	Rimini, Italy	Decision (Unanimous)	3	3:00	8-3-1
2010-4-11	Draw	Soraya Bucherie	Warriors	Crawley, United Kingdom	Decision (Unanimous)	3	3:00	7-3-1
2009-10-31	Loss	Seda Duygu Aygun	Boks Gecesi	Istanbul, Turkey	Decision (Unanimous)	3	3:00	7-3
2009-8-1	Win	Angelica Falk	Muaythai Legends	Croydon, United Kingdom	Decision (Unanimous)	3	3:00	7-12
2009-2-7	Win	Sarai Medina	Muaythai Legends - England vs Thailand	Croydon, United Kingdom	Decision (Unanimous)	3	3:00	6-2
2008-8-16	Win	Leonor Agostinho	Muaythai Legends - England vs Thailand	Croydon, United Kingdom	Decision (Unanimous)	3	3:00	5-2
Wins the European WMC Flyweight Title.
2008-7-26	Loss	Christine Toledo	World Championship Muay Thai	Las Vegas, United States	Decision (Unanimous)	3	3:00	4-2
2008-5-27	Win	Charlotte Webster	The Ladykillers III	Altrincham, United Kingdom	Decision (Unanimous)	3	3:00	3-1
2008-5-27	Win	Christi Brereton	?	London, United Kingdom	Decision (Unanimous)	2	3:00	2-1
2008-2-16	Win	Michelle Grizzle	The Ladykillers II	Wythenshawe, United Kingdom	Decision (Split)	5	2:00	1-1
Wins the IKF Pro British Flyweight Title.
2008	Loss	Michelle Grizzle	The Ladykillers I	?, United Kingdom	Decision (Unanimous)	3	2:00	0-1
For the IKF Pro British Flyweight Title.
Legend: Win Loss Draw/No contest Notes

== See also ==
- List of female kickboxers
- List of WBC Muaythai female world champions
- List of WBC Muaythai diamond champions
