= List of WBC Muaythai international challenge winners =

This is a list of WBC Muaythai international challenge winners, showing every "international challenge" match winner certificated by the World Boxing Council Muaythai (WBC Muaythai). The WBC, which is one of the four major governing bodies in professional boxing, started certifying their own Muay Thai world champions in 19 different weight classes in 2005.

The international challenge matches are for the competitors who are not qualified for the official championships, therefore it is not championship. In addition, it is completely different from "international championships". The winners of international challenge matches are given commemorative belts.

== Super heavyweight ==
No.	Name	Date winning

== Heavyweight ==
No.	Name	Date winning

== Super cruiserweight ==
No.	Name	Date winning

== Cruiserweight ==
No.	Name	Date winning
	(Russia) Muslim Magomedovich Salikhov	January 1, 2012
Salikhov defeated Baoming Li (China) by unanimous decision (29-28/30-27/30-27) after 3R at "Ultimate Fighter" at Changsha Sports Museum of Art, Central South University of Forestry and Technology in Changsha, Hunan, China. The contract weight was 80kg.
	(Sweden) Zabastian Kadesma	June 6, 2015
Kadesma defeated Seyed Razi Madhd (Iran) by KO(Right cross) at 1R 1:10 at Macau Forum in Sé, Macau, China.

== Light heavyweight ==
No.	Name	Date winning

== Super middleweight ==
No.	Name	Date winning
	(France) Wendy Annonay	April 4, 2015
Annonay defeated Sofian Mwayembe (France) by decision after 5R at "Lion Belt 5" at Gymnase Le Phare in Belfort, France.He wore the belt of international challenge, but this bout was introduced as "European championship" on media.
	(France) Wendy Annonay	July 4, 2015
Annonay defeated Berat Aliu (Germany) at "Fight Night" at Reithalle Winterthur in Winterthur, Switzerland. Originally, he was going to fight against Shkodran Veseli (Switzerland/Albania). He wore the belt of international challenge, but this bout was introduced as "European championship" on media.
	(France) Djibril Ehouo	December 5, 2015
Ehouo defeated Shkodran Veseli (Switzerland/Albania) by decision after 5R at "Swiss Las Vegas Fusion" at St. Jacob Arena in Basel, Switzerland. He wore the belt of international challenge, but this bout was introduced as "European championship" on media.

== Middleweight ==
No.	Name	Date winning
	(United States) Chaz Mulkey	May 14, 2011
Mulkey defeated Ken Tran (Canada) by unanimous decision after 5R at the Star of the Desert Arena at Buffalo Bill's Casino in Primm, Nevada, USA.
	(United Kingdom) Daniel Bowie (Dan Bowie)	July 5, 2014
Bowie defeated Adrien Vaerwyk (France) by KO (Right hook from left elbow strike) at 2R at "SMASH 9" at Woodside Sports Arena in Watford Leisure Centre in Watford, England, UK.
	(Thailand) Superbon Banchamek	August 15, 2014
Superbon defeated Amadeu Cristiano (Brazil) by KO at 2R at Chiang Mai Rajabhat University in Chiang Mai Province, Thailand. The contract weight was 72kg.
	(France) Kamel Mezatni	April 4, 2015
Mezatni defeated Yazid Boussaha (France) by decision after 5R at "Lion Belt 5" at Gymnase Le Phare in Belfort, France.He wore the belt of international challenge, but this bout was introduced as "European championship" on media.
	(China) Yuxuan Lian	October 6, 2015
Lian defeated Abdullah (Malaysia) by KO(Left low kick) at 1R 1:04 at "Final Legends - 3 World Combat Series - Bullet Fight" at Grand Epoch City Hotels at Xianghe County, Hebei, China.
	(Thailand) Armin Pumpanmuang	February 6, 2016
Armin defeated Armen Petrosyan (Armenia/Italy) by decision after 5R at "Ring War 2016" at Palazzo dello sport in Monza, Lombardy, Italy.

== Super welterweight ==
No.	Name	Date winning
	(United Kingdom) (Wales) Michael Eagan (aka Mike Egan)	September 6, 2014
Eagan defeated Román Marcial Molina (Spain) by unanimous decision after 5R at the Liverpool Olympia in Liverpool, England, U.K.
	(United Kingdom) (Scotland) John-Ross Morrison	MArch 20, 2015
Morisson defeated Abdoul Karim Touré (France) by decision after 5R at ESU Fight Night at Rivals Sports Centre in Wishaw, Scotland, UK.
	(Portugal) Ricardo Luiz	August 1, 2015
Luiz defeated John-Ross Morrison (United Kingdom/Scotland) by KO(Right cross) at 3R 1:01 at the Lagoon Arena in Paisley, Scotland, UK. The contract weight was 69.8 kg.
	(Thailand) Paetongkum Lukbaanyai	June 22, 2018
Paetongkum defeated Luajiah Sathianmuaythai (China).

== Welterweight ==
No.	Name	Date winning
	(France) Bobo Sacko	May 25, 2014
Sacko defeated Mauro Serra (Italy) by decision after 5R at "Thai Boxing Showtime 5" at Espace Omnisports Henri Desbuquois in Hazebrouck, Nord, France.He wore the belt of international challenge, but this bout was introduced as "European championship" on media.
	(Thailand) Kronpet Petchrachapat Janjira	June 14, 2014
Kronpet defeated Eddie Martinez (United States) by split decision (49-47/48-47/46-49) after 5R at "Warriors Cup XX" at Branchburg Sports Complex in Branchburg, New Jersey, United States. The contract weight was 147lbs.
	(China) Weichao Chen	August 15, 2014
Chen defeated Wilfried Montagne (France) by decision at Chiang Mai Rajabhat University in Chiang Mai Province, Thailand. The contract weight was 67kg.
	(Thailand) Ain Wichian	October 3, 2015
Wichian defeated "Bill" Shui-Biu Chong (Hong Kong) by TKO(Referee stoppage: Left knee shot) at 4R 1:40 at "Xtreme Muay Thai 2015" at Cotai Arena, The Venetian Macao, Macao, China.

== Super lightweight ==
No.	Name	Date winning
	(Japan) Keijiro Miyakoshi	April 27, 2014
Miyakoshi defeated Ninghui Wei (China) by unanimous decision (9-10/9-10/9-10) after 4R(Extra 1R) at Solaire Resort & Casino in Manila, Philippines. The score after 3R was 28-29/29-29/29-29 and was for Miyakoshi. The contract weight was 61.5kg.
	(Lithuania) Deividas Danyla	September 17, 2014
Danyla defeated Rami Ibrahim (Palestine/United States) by TKO (Referee stoppage:back spin right elbow strike) at 2R 1:08 at Rahway Recreation Center in Rahway, New Jersey, United States. The contract weight was 137lbs.
	(China) Dongqiang Lu	February 20, 2016
Lu defeated Ruslan Salmanov (Russia) by unanimous decision (30-27/29-28/30-27) after 3R at "QUSN Quanzhou Battle" at Channel Sports Center in Quanzhou, Fujian, China.

== Light weight ==
No.	Name	Date winning
The bout between Reinhard Badato (Philippines) vs. Wang Wanben (China) was ended as split draw (40-39/39-39/39-39) and 1 for Badato after 4R(Extra 1R) at Solaire Resort & Casino in Manila, Philippines on April 27, 2014. The result of the bout just after 3R was split decision. The contract weight was 60kg.
	(United Kingdom) Anthony Ferguson	June 29, 2014
Ferguson defeated James O’Connell (Iran) by decision after 5R at "Shock Wave" in Milton Keynes, England, UK.
	(China) Ming Yang	October 6, 2015
Yang defeated Tata (Philippines) by TKO(forefit) at 3R 3:00 at "Final Legends - 3 World Combat Series - Bullet Fight" at Grand Epoch City Hotels at Xianghe County, Hebei, China.

== Super featherweight ==
No.	Name	Date winning
	(Palestine) (United States) Rami Ibrahim	September 7, 2013
Ibrahim defeated Thanit Watthanaya (Thailand) by unanimous decision (49-48/48-47/48-47) after 5R at "Warriors Cup XVIII" at Schuetzen Park in North Bergen, New Jersey, United States.
The bout between Yukiya Nakamura (Japan) vs. Kamyam Lee (a.k.a. Kenneth Lee/Hong Kong) was ended split decision 1–1 (47-49/48-48/48-47) after 5R on March 29, 2014. The contract weight was 58.9kg as super featherweight, but it was changed to 61kg just 3 days before the match.
	(Thailand) Sam-A Kaiyanghadaogym	October 21, 2014
Sam-A defeated Andrew Doyle (Ireland) by TKO (left knee strike to head) at 4R at "2014 Liangansidi Martial Arts Charity Championship" at Yan Oi Tong Jockey Club Community and. Sports Centre in Hong Kong.

== Featherweight ==
No.	Name	Date winning
	(United Kingdom) Jonathan Haggerty	November 8, 2014
Haggerty defeated Juan Jesús Antúnez (Spain) by KO at 2R at "Muaythai Mayhem" at Copthorne Hotel Effingham in West Sussex, England, UK.

== Super bantamweight ==
No.	Name	Date winning

== Bantamweight ==
No.	Name	Date winning

== Super flyweight ==
No.	Name	Date winning
	(Vietnam) Nguyen Ke Nhon (Nguyễn Kế Nhơn)	February 27, 2018
Nguyen defeated Sergei Belik (Russia) by unanimous decision(49-48/49-48/49-48) after 5R at Lumpinee Stadium in Bangkok, Thailand.

== Flyweight ==
No.	Name	Date winning

== Light flyweight ==
No.	Name	Date winning

== Mini flyweight ==
No.	Name	Date winning

== See also ==
- List of WBC Muaythai diamond champions
- List of WBC Muaythai world champions
- List of WBC Muaythai international champions
