= Larry Flynt's Lucky Lady Casino =

Casino in Gardena, California, United States

Coordinates: 33.90238°N 118.29329°W

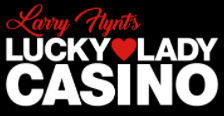
- Interactive map of Larry Flynt's Lucky Lady Casino
- Opened: 1940
- Casino type: Cardroom
- Owner: Larry Flynt
- Previous names: The Western Club (1940-1947); Normandie Casino (1947-2016)
- Website: luckyladyla.com

Larry Flynt's Lucky Lady Casino is a cardroom located in Gardena, California. It replaced Normandie Casino.

In 1940, the Western Club opened on Western Avenue. Seven years later, the club was renamed the Normandie, and Russ Miller became owner. As the city of Gardena grew, so did the card clubs. Their license fees provided most of the money needed to operate the city.

During the 1960s, Gardena boasted six luxurious card clubs. It was the only city in Los Angeles County to have legal gambling. The clubs flourished until 1980, when the Bell Club in the city of Bell, California, opened. Other cities soon followed suit, and the Gardena monopoly on card gaming came to an end.

In 1980, Russ Miller decided to move the Normandie Casino to a lucrative location near the 110 Harbor Freeway at 1045 West Rosecrans Avenue. A new 50,000-square-foot (4,600 m^{2}) casino was constructed, along with a Las Vegas-style entertainment venue billed as "The Million Dollar Showroom". A few years later, Seven-card stud and Texas hold-em were added to the already existing lineup of games, Five-card draw and Lowball.

In the mid-1980s, a tremendous Asian influence came with the introduction of the California games, including Blackjack, Pai Gow Poker, and Super 9, a game similar to Baccarat. The Normandie completely revamped its restaurant to accommodate a variety of Asian tastes: Mandarin, Vietnamese, Thai, and Korean, along with a standard Continental menu. The Normandie Casino opened its famous Red Dragon Room which featured high-limit Asian games. The Red Dragon Room, with its additional outdoor patio, continues to be one of the most popular Asian gaming rooms in Los Angeles today. The casino is also host to a luxurious V.I.P. Blackjack and Baccarat Room, a first in Southern California.

In 2016, several members of the Miller family had their gaming licenses revoked for anti–money laundering violations, and they were given 120 days to sell the casino. Larry Flynt, owner of the nearby Hustler Casino, won regulatory approval to purchase the Normandie in June 2016, with plans to rename it as Larry Flynt's Lucky Lady Casino.
