= Tomonori =

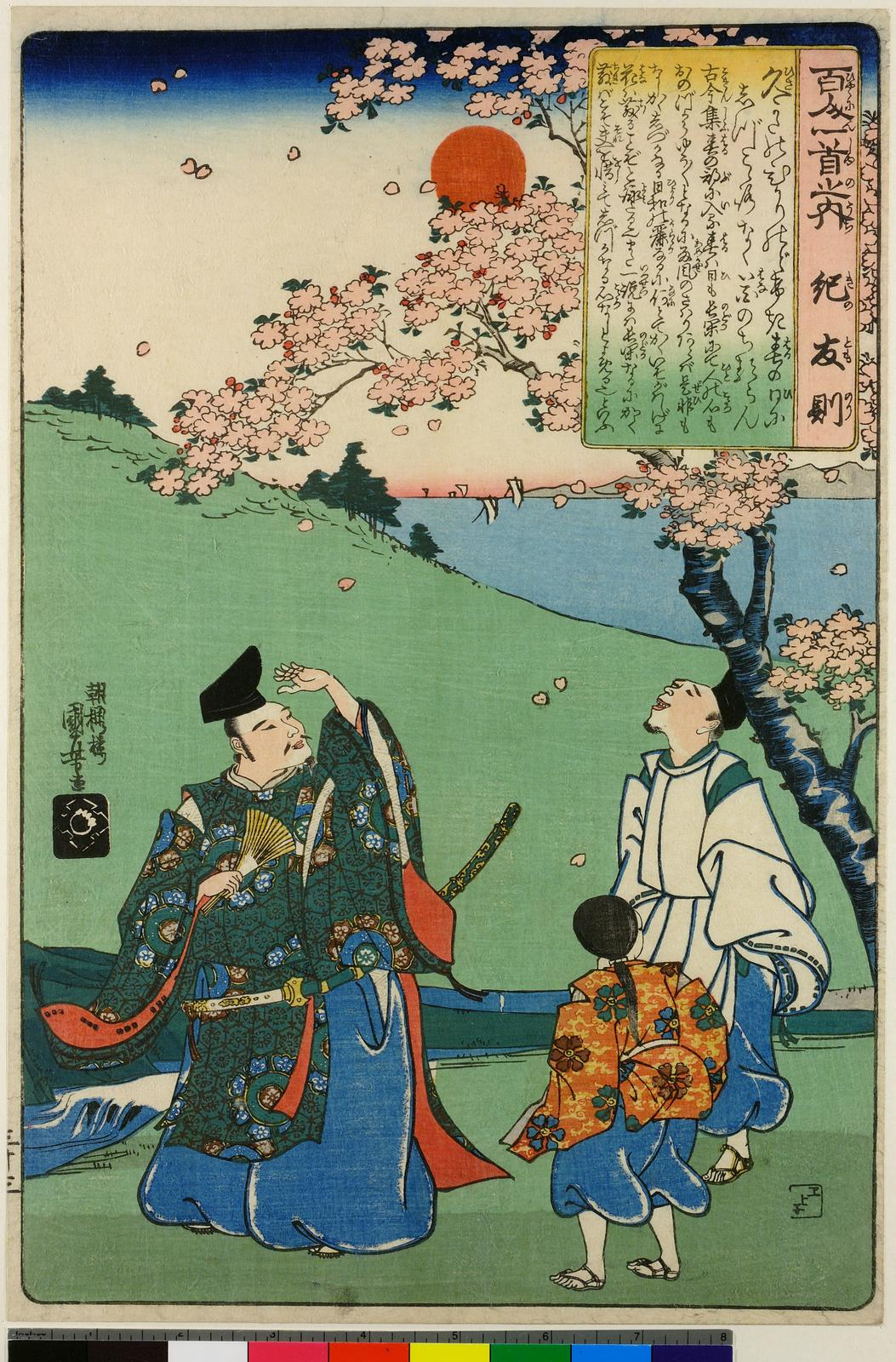
- Tomonori Ki (850–904), Japanese poet
- Pronunciation: tomonoɾi (IPA)
- Gender: Male

Origin
- Origin: Japanese
- Meaning: Different meanings depending on the kanji used

Tomonori is a masculine Japanese given name.

== Written forms ==
Tomonori can be written using many different combinations of kanji characters. Some examples:

- 友則, "friend, rule"
- 友紀, "friend, chronicle"
- 友憲, "friend, constitution"
- 友徳, "friend, benevolence"
- 友範, "friend, pattern"
- 友典, "friend, law code"
- 友法, "friend, method"
- 知則, "know, rule"
- 知紀, "know, chronicle"
- 知憲, "know, constitution"
- 知徳, "know, benevolence"
- 知範, "know, pattern"
- 知典, "know, law code"
- 智則, "intellect, rule"
- 智紀, "intellect, chronicle"
- 智憲, "intellect, constitution"
- 智典, "intellect, law code"
- 共紀, "together, chronicle"
- 共憲, "together, constitution"
- 朋紀, "companion, chronicle"
- 朋憲, "companion, constitution"
- 朝紀, "morning/dynasty, chronicle"
- 朝憲, "morning/dynasty, constitution"
- 朝徳, "morning/dynasty, benevolence"
- 朝典, "morning/dynasty, law code"

The name can also be written in hiragana とものり or katakana トモノリ.

== Notable people with the name ==
- Tomonori Hirayama (平山 智規; born 1978), Japanese footballer
- Tomonori Jinnai (陣内 智則; born 1974), Japanese comedian and television presenter
- Tomonori Ki (紀 友則; 850–904), Japanese poet
- Tomonori Kitabatake (北畠 具教; 1528–1576), Japanese daimyō
- Tomonori Kogawa (湖川 友謙; born 1950), Japanese animator and character designer
- Tomonori Maeda (前田 智徳; born 1971), Japanese baseball player
- Tomonori Ohara (大原 友則; born 1991), Japanese mixed martial artist
- Tomonori Tateishi (立石 智紀; born 1974), Japanese footballer
- Tomonori Tsunematsu (恒松 伴典; born 1976), Japanese footballer
- Tomonori Yoshida (吉田 友紀; born 1966), Japanese actor

== Fictional characters ==
- Tomonori Michitani (蕗谷 トモノリ), a character in the anime series Super Doll Licca-chan
