= List of WBC Muaythai female world champions =

This is a list of WBC Muaythai female world champions, showing every female world champion certificated by the World Boxing Council Muaythai (WBC Muaythai). The WBC, which is one of the four major governing bodies in professional boxing, started certifying their own Muay Thai world champions in 19 different weight classes in 2005.

== Welterweight ==
No.	Name	Date winning	Date losing	Days	Defenses
1	(United Kingdom) Julie Kitchen	April 7, 2011	?	?	0
Kitchen defeated Nam Pimnipa (Thailand) by TKO at 3R at Fairtex Stadium in Pattaya, Thailand, and she won the title.
2	(Brazil) Rosemary Amorim	August 30, 2025	?	?	0
Amorim defeated Angela Whitley (United Kingdom) by decision after 5R in Puerto Rico, and to win the title.

== Lightweight ==
No.	Name	Date winning	Date losing	Days	Defenses
1	(United States) Miriam Herbie Nakamoto	August 21, 2010	2014	?	1
Nakamoto defeated Claire Haigh (Luxembourg) by KO at 1R at Haikou City Stadium in Haikou, Hainan, China, and she on the title. On August 24, 2013, Nakamoto defeated Aleide Lawant (Netherlands) by unanimous decision (50-47/50-45/50-45) after 5R at Pechanga Resort & Casino in Temecula, California, United States, and she retained his title(1).
2	(United Kingdom) Niamh Kinehan	February 12, 2022	Current titleholder	?	0
Nakamoto defeated Ludovica Ciarpaglini (Italy) in Bolton, United Kingdom.

== Super featherweight ==
No.	Name	Date winning	Date losing	Days	Defenses
1	(Australia) Shannon Gardiner	??, 20??	?	?	1?
Gardiner defeated Claire Rankin (United Kingdom) in Perth, Australia, and she defended the title.

== Featherweight ==
No.	Name	Date winning	Date losing	Days	Defenses
1	(United Kingdom) Lucy Payne	June 13, 2015	?	?	0
Payne defeated Chajmaa Bellakhal (Morocco) by TKO at 2R 3:00 at The John Charles Centre For Sports in Leeds, England, UK, and she won the title.
2	(United Kingdom) Bernise Alldis	November 19, 2016	?	?	?
Alldis defeated Emily Wahby (Italy) at Copthorne Effingham Gatwick Hotel in Copthorne, England, UK, and she won the title.
3	(Ukraine) Lena Ovchynnikova	December 7, 2019	?	?	?
Ovchynnikova defeated Cindy Silvestre (France) at LVIV Open Cup in Lviv, Ukraine, UKR, and she won the title.

== Super bantamweight ==
No.	Name	Date winning	Date losing	Days	Defenses
1	(United Kingdom) Ruth Ashdown	November 19, 2016	?	?	0
Ashdown defeated Sveva Melillo (Italy) by unanimous decision after 5R at Effingham Park Hotel in Copthorne, England, UK, and she won the title.
1	(Switzerland) Natacha De Almeida	March 9, 2019	?	?	0
Ashdown defeated Dolphina Walter Tony by unanimous decision after 5R at Bukom Boxing Arena in Accra, Ghana, and she won the title.

== Bantamweight ==
No.	Name	Date winning	Date losing	Days	Defenses
1	(Netherlands) Jemyma Betrian	November 11, 2012	?	?	2
Betrian defeated Tiana Caverly (Australia) by unanimous decision (50-45/50-45/50-45) after 5R at Plaza Hotel in Las Vegas, Nevada, United States, and she won the title. On June 7, 2014, Betrian defeated Jessica Mairi(Canada) by KO at 3R at Branchburg Sports Complex in Branchburg, New Jersey
2	(Canada) Jessica Mairi	April 13, 2013		372	1
On April 13, 2013, Mairi defeated Dionapha Kiate Kiangsak (Thailand) by KO at 3R at "Top King Thailand" in Phuket, Thailand
3	(Thailand) Saifah Sor Suparat	May 8, 2015	January 1, 2016	238	0
Saifah Sor Suparat defeated Teresa Wintermyr (Sweden) by a unanimous decision after 5R in Chiang Mai, Thailand.
4	(France) Anissa Meksen	March 26, 2016	April 1, 2017	371	0
Meksen defeated Meryem Uslu (Germany) by unanimous decision after 5R at Le Colisee in Chalon-sur-Saône, Saône-et-Loire, France, and she won the title.
5	(Australia) Alma Juniku	December 13, 2018	June 12, 2019	181	0
Juniku defeated Zaza Sor. Aree (Thailand) by unanimous decision after 5R in Ōsaka, Japan.
6	(Brazil) Barbara Aguiar	November 28, 2022		1428	0
Aguiar defeated Joanne La (Australia) by unanimous decision after 5R in Melbourne, Australia.

== Super flyweight ==
No.	Name	Date winning	Date losing	Days	Defenses
1	(New Zealand) Michelle Preston	November 18, 2017	?	?	?
Preston defeated Fani Peloumpi (Greece) by split decision (47-48/48-47/49-46) after 5R at ASB Stadium in Auckland, New Zealand, and she won the title.
2	(Thailand) Dangkongfah Sittongsak	November 6, 2021	Current	1815	0
Dangkongfah defeated Souris Manfredi (France) by decision at Fairtex Stadium, Pattaya, and she won the title

== Flyweight ==
No.	Name	Date winning	Date losing	Days	Defenses
1	(United Kingdom) Ruth Ashdown	November 4, 2013	July 19, 2014	257	0
Ashdown defeated Laila Akounad (France) by TKO(Referee stoppage) at 2R at Copthorne Hotel Effingham in West Sussex, England, UK, and she won the title.
2	(Ukraine) Lena Ovchynnikova / Oléna Serhíyivna Ovchýnnikova	July 19, 2014	?	?	?
Ovchynnikova defeated Ruth Ashdown (United Kingdom) by unanimous decision (49-46/50-45/49-46) after 5R at Morongo Casino Resort in Cabazon, California, United States, and she won the title.
3	(Spain) Lara Fernandez	March 9, 2020	February 5, 2023	1060	0
Fernandez defeated Grace Spicer (England) by unanimous decision after 5R at O2Indigo Arena in London, England, and won the title.
4	(Turkey) Zehra Doğan	February 5, 2023	Current	1359	0
Doğan defeated Gabriele Batista (Brazil) by spilit decision after 5R in Hua Hin, Thailand, and won the title.

== Mini flyweight ==
No.	Name	Date winning	Date losing	Days	Defenses
1	(Finland) Lotta Loikkanen	July 25, 2010	?	?	?
Loikkanen defeated Denise Mellor (United Kingdom) by decision after 5R at Carrington House Hotel in Bournemouth, England, UK, and she won the title.
2	(United Kingdom) Denise Mellor	June 22, 2012	?	?	?
Mellor defeated Nattaya Kantasit (Thailand) by unanimous decision (49-47/50-45/50-46) after 5R at O2 Academy Bournemouth in Bournemouth, England, UK, and she won the title. Originally, Mellor was going to fight against Loma Sitjatao (Thailand).
3	(Japan) Saya Ito	November 26, 2017	2021	?	0
Ito defeated Yodying Sit.namkabuan (Thailand) by the unanimous decision (49-47/50-46/ 50-46) after 5R at Korakuen Hall in Bunkyo, Tokyo, Japan, and she won the title. Yodying was originally written as "Yodying Sit.muaysiam".
4	(Thailand) Saenajan SorJor Tongprajin	September 18, 2021	Current	?	0
Ito defeated Buakaw MorKorChor (Thailand) at Lumpinee Stadium in Bangkok, Thailand
5	(Japan) Noa Fujiwara	October 4, 2025	Current	?	0
Fujiwara defeated Khaikew Sit. Panancheng (Thailand) by Decision in Yokosuka, Japan to win the title..

== Minimumweight ==
No.	Name	Date winning	Date losing	Days	Defenses
1	(United States) Sylvie von Duuglas-Ittu	February 4, 2023	Current	?	0
Duuglas-Ittu defeated Elisabetta Solinas (Italy) in Hua Hin, Thailand, and won the title.

== See also ==
- List of WBC Muaythai world champions
- List of IBF Muaythai world champions
- List of WBC Muaythai female international champions
