= List of WBC Muaythai female international champions =

This is a list of WBC Muaythai female international champions, showing every female international champion certificated by the World Boxing Council Muaythai (WBC Muaythai). The WBC, which is one of the four major governing bodies in professional boxing, started certifying their own Muay Thai world champions in 19 different weight classes in 2005.

== Super heavyweight ==
| No. | Name | Date winning | Date losing | Days | Defenses |

== Heavyweight ==
| No. | Name | Date winning | Date losing | Days | Defenses |

== Super cruiserweight ==
| No. | Name | Date winning | Date losing | Days | Defenses |

== Cruiserweight ==
| No. | Name | Date winning | Date losing | Days | Defenses |

== Light heavyweight ==
| No. | Name | Date winning | Date losing | Days | Defenses |

== Super middleweight ==
| No. | Name | Date winning | Date losing | Days | Defenses |

== Middleweight ==
| No. | Name | Date winning | Date losing | Days | Defenses |

== Super welterweight ==
| No. | Name | Date winning | Date losing | Days | Defenses |

== Welterweight ==
| No. | Name | Date winning | Date losing | Days | Defenses |

== Super lightweight ==
| No. | Name | Date winning | Date losing | Days | Defenses |

== Lightweight ==
| No. | Name | Date winning | Date losing | Days | Defenses |

== Super featherweight ==
| No. | Name | Date winning | Date losing | Days | Defenses |

== Featherweight ==
| No. | Name | Date winning | Date losing | Days | Defenses |

== Super Bantamweight ==
| No. | Name | Date winning | Date losing | Days | Defenses |
|---|---|---|---|---|---|
| 1 | (United States) Tiffany van Soest | October 13, 2012 | ? | ? | ? |
van Soest defeated Jeri Sitzes (United States) by decision after 5R at "Lion Fight 7" at Hard Rock Hotel & Casino in Las Vegas, Nevada, USA.
| 2 | (United Kingdom) (England) Iman Barlow | November 30, 2019 | ? | ? | ? |
_{Barlow defeated Brooke Farrell (Australia) by decision at "Muay Thai Grand Prix" in Melville, Australia, and she won the vacant title.}

== Bantamweight ==
| No. | Name | Date winning | Date losing | Days | Defenses |

== Super Flyweight ==
| No. | Name | Date winning | Date losing | Days | Defenses |
|---|---|---|---|---|---|
| 1 | (United Kingdom) (England) Ruth Ashdown | March 9, 2013 | ? | ? | ? |
Ashdown defeated Kate Stables (United Kingdom/England) by majority decision after 5R at "Smash Muaythai 3" at Greenbank Sports Academy in Liverpool, England, UK, and she won the vacant title.

== Flyweight ==
| No. | Name | Date winning | Date losing | Days | Defenses |
|---|---|---|---|---|---|
| 1 | (United Kingdom) (Scotland) Amy Pirnie | November 19, 2016 | ? | ? | ? |
Pirnie defeated Barbara Bomtempi (Italy) by TKO (Referee stoppage: Right body hook) at "Fight Sport Extreme" at Stepps Cultural Centre in Glasgow, Scotland, UK, and she won the vacant title.
| 2 | (Italy) Elisabetta Solinas | August 02, 2019 | March 03, 2020 | 218 | |
Solinas defeated Desiree Rovira (Spain) by unanimous decision at "Fight Night Cadiz" at Momart Theatre in Cadiz, Spain, and she won the title.
| 3 | (United Kingdom) (England) Dani Fall | March 03, 2020 | ? | | |
^{Fall defeated Solinas (Italy) by TKO (Referee stoppage: Knees) at "Muay Thai Grand Prix" at The Hanger in Wolverhampton, England, UK, and she won the title}

== Light Flyweight ==
| No. | Name | Date winning | Date losing | Days | Defenses |
|---|---|---|---|---|---|
| 1 | (Japan) Erika Kamimura | October 2, 2011 | ? | ? | 0 |
Kamimura defeated Denise Mellor (United Kingdom/England) by KO (Left hook) at 1R1:49, and she won the vacant title.

== Mini Flyweight ==
| No. | Name | Date winning | Date losing | Days | Defenses |
|---|---|---|---|---|---|
| 1 | (United Kingdom) (England) Denise Mellor | July 14, 2011 | ? | ? | ? |
Mellor defeated Annie Errikson (Sweden) by unanimous decision (50-45/50-45/50-46) after 5R at "Muaythai World Series" at O2 Academy Bournemouth in Bournemouth, England, UK, and she won the vacant title.
| Interim | (Japan) Little Tiger (Ayaka Miyauchi) | July 26, 2014 | ? | 0 | 0 |
Miyauchi defeated Faacheangrai S.Sakonthon by majority decision (48-47/48-47/48-48) after 5R at Pattaya Boxing World Studiam in Pattaya, Thailand, and she won the vacant interim title.

== See also ==
- List of WBC Muaythai diamond champions
- List of WBC Muaythai world champions
- List of WBC Muaythai female world champions
