= Romie Adanza =

American Muay Thai kickboxer

- Born: Romie Kris Adanza; August 1, 1979 (age 47); Houston, Texas, United States
- Nationality: American
- Height: 1.63 m (5 ft 4 in)
- Weight: 52.1 kg (115 lb; 8.20 st)
- Division: Flyweight; Bantamweight; Featherweight
- Style: Muay Thai
- Stance: Orthodox
- Fighting out of: Irvine, California, United States
- Team: Team Oyama
- Trainer: Colin Oyama
- Years active: 2004–present

Kickboxing record
- Total: 26
- Wins: 18
- By knockout: 9
- Losses: 7
- By knockout: 3
- Draws: 1
- Last updated on: April 19, 2014

Romie Kris Adanza (born August 1, 1979) is an American Muay Thai kickboxer who competes in the flyweight division. Known for his good boxing skills and aggressive fighting style, he began his career as a featherweight, winning the WBC Muaythai International Featherweight Championship before dropping down to bantamweight and having even more success by taking the WBC Muaythai national title and the IKKC International Super Bantamweight belt. After one final weight class change down to flyweight, he won another WBC International crown before becoming the MTAA World Flyweight Champion.

== Early life ==
Adanza was born of Filipino descent in Houston, Texas, on August 1, 1979. In his youth, he lived in China and the Philippines before settling in California. He took up boxing at twenty-one years old, before turning to Muay Thai five years later.

== Career ==
Early in his career, Adanza outpointed future American great Kevin Ross at featherweight in Las Vegas, Nevada, on March 25, 2005. On September 24, 2005, he defeated Kim Morris via technical knockout in the first round in Irvine, California. He won the WBC Muaythai International Featherweight (-57.153 kg/126 lb) Championship before dropping down to bantamweight.

In his new-found weight division, Adanza soon won both the International Karate Kickboxing Council (IKKC) International Super Bantamweight Muay Thai title and the WBC Muaythai United States Bantamweight (-53.524 kg/118 lb) strap. He retained both of these titles against Paulo da Silva at the Las Vegas Hilton in Las Vegas on July 25, 2009. Adanza pelted da Silva with kicks to the leg throughout the fight before scoring a knockdown via low kick in the third round. Adanza finished off Silva 26 seconds into the fourth after Silva could not continue following another low kick knockdown. Fighting for his third international title, Adanza took on Kunitaka Fujiwara for the WBC Muaythai International Super Bantamweight (-55.338 kg/122 lb) belt on December 5, 2009, in Primm, Nevada. Fujiwara struck Adanza with elbows throughout the fight, causing cuts on his head and forcing the referee to stop the bout in round four.

Adanza took a controversial split decision over Andy Howson in Santa Monica, California, in April 2010. He made another defence of his IKKC title on October 2, 2010, in Pala, California. Adanza was initially scheduled to face Haigang Huang. However, Huang pulled out from the fight and was replaced by Paulo da Silva, setting up a fourth meeting between the pair. Adanza won via unanimous decision to lead their rivalry at 3–1. Adanza featured in a four-man, 122 lb tournament in Haikou, China beginning on December 18, 2010. At the semi-final stage, he was drawn against Paulo da Silva for the fifth time and defeated his rival once again by unanimous decision. On the tournament's second day, Adanza went into the final against Li Ning. After fighting for five rounds, Adanza lost a unanimous decision.

On May 28, 2011, Adanza defended his IKKC International title against Thanit Watthanaya in Pala, California. After two close rounds, he was able to knockout Thanit with a knee strike in the third. In Manila, Philippines on June 26, 2011, he defeated Huang Hai Gong by unanimous decision to win the WBC Muaythai International Featherweight (-57.153 kg/126 lb) belt.

He was set to face Damien Trainor in Primm, Nevada on August 20, 2011 but was forced to pull out of the fight due to a hip injury sustained in his bout with Huang. Adanza then beat Shuichi Wentz via unanimous decision in Pala, California on September 24, 2011. He followed this up with a fourth-round KO of Langsuanlek Sasiprapa on October 21, 2011, in Los Angeles, California, to win his first world title, the Muay Thai Association of America (MTAA) World Flyweight Championship.

At Korakuen Hall in Tokyo, Japan, on February 18, 2012, he beat Tomonori Sato via TKO due to a cut in the second round to win the WBC Muaythai International Super Flyweight (-52.163 kg/115 lb) Championship. He was then expected to rematch Sato in a non-title fight on May 12, 2012, in Las Vegas, but Sato was replaced by Thanit Watthanaya to set up another rematch. Thanit was able to take his revenge this time, winning a close split decision. Following this, Adanza signed a contract with historic kickboxing promotion K-1 and was initially slated to debut inside the organization with a second bout with Andy Howson at the K-1 World Grand Prix 2012 in Los Angeles on September 8, 2012. Howson sustained a broken foot and nose in his previous fight with Nobuchika Terado, however, and was unable to fight. Therefore, another fighter familiar to Adanza in the form of Shuichi Wentz took his place. Just twenty-three seconds into the fight, Wentz countered a right punch by Adanza with a right high kick that sent Adanza crashing to the canvas, knocking him out ultra-violently.

He challenged Jomhod Eminent Air for the WBC Super Flyweight (55.338 kg/ 122 lb) world title at M-One: Reborn in Highland, California, on May 16, 2013, and lost via TKO due to a cut in round one. Adanza had his rubber match with Thanit Watthanaya at WCK Muay Thai: King's Birthday Celebration 2013 in Inglewood, California, on December 7, 2013 and stopped his Thai foe with a second round body shot.

He fought to a draw with Franck Gross at WCK Muay Thai: Cali 4 in Los Angeles on April 19, 2014.

== Championships and awards ==
=== Kickboxing ===
- International Karate Kickboxing Council
  - IKKC International Super Bantamweight Muay Thai Championship
  - IKKC Intercontinental Featherweight Championship
- Muay Thai Association of America
  - MTAA World Flyweight Championship
- World Boxing Council Muaythai
  - WBC Muaythai International Super Flyweight (-52.163 kg/115 lb) Championship
  - WBC Muaythai United States Bantamweight (-53.524 kg/118 lb) Championship
  - WBC Muaythai United States Featherweight (-57.153 kg/126 lb) Championship
  - WBC Muaythai International Featherweight (-57.153 kg/126 lb) Championship
- World Championship Kickboxing Muay Thai
  - WCK Muay Thai Super Bantamweight (-55 kg/122 lb) Tournament runner-up

== Fight record ==
Kickboxing and Muay Thai record
18 wins (9 KOs), 5 losses, 1 draw
| Date | Result | Opponent | Event | Location | Method | Round | Time |
| 2015-07-31 | Win | (England) Daniel McGowan | Lion Fight 23 | Temecula, California, US | TKO (cut) | 3 | 2:19 |
| 2014-04-19 | Loss | (France) Franck Gross | WCK Muay Thai: Cali 4 | Los Angeles, California, US | Decision | 5 | 3:00 |
| 2013-12-07 | Win | (Thailand) Thanit Watthanaya | WCK Muay Thai: King's Birthday Celebration 2013 | Inglewood, California, US | KO (left hook to the body) | 2 | |
Defends the WBC Muaythai International Super Flyweight (-52.163 kg/115 lb) Championship.
| 2013-05-16 | Loss | (Thailand) Jomhod Eminentair | M-One: Reborn | Highland, California, US | TKO (cut) | 1 | 1:21 |
For the WBC Muaythai World Super Flyweight (55.338 kg/ 122 lb) Championship.
| 2012-09-08 | Loss | (Japan) Shuichi Wentz | K-1 World Grand Prix 2012 in Los Angeles | Los Angeles, California, US | KO (right high kick) | 1 | 0:23 |
| 2012-05-12 | Loss | (Thailand) Thanit Watthanaya | Lion Fight: Battle in the Desert VI | Las Vegas, Nevada, US | Decision (split) | 5 | 3:00 |
| 2012-02-18 | Win | (Japan) Tomonori Sato | NJKF: Kick to the Future 1 | Tokyo, Japan | TKO (cut) | 2 | 0:19 |
Wins the WBC Muaythai International Super Flyweight (-52.163 kg/115 lb) Championship.
| 2011-10-21 | Win | (Thailand) Langsuanlek Sasiprapa | M-One Muay Thai: Team Thailand vs. Team USA | Los Angeles, California, US | KO (right uppercut) | 4 | 0:31 |
Wins the MTAA World Flyweight Championship.
| 2011-09-24 | Win | (Japan) Shuichi Wentz | WCK Muay Thai | Pala, California, US | Decision (unanimous) | 5 | 3:00 |
| 2011-06-26 | Win | (China) Huang Hai Gong | WCK Muay Thai | Manila, Philippines | Decision (unanimous) | 5 | 3:00 |
Wins the WBC Muaythai International Featherweight (-57.153 kg/126 lb) Championship.
| 2011-05-28 | Win | (Thailand) Thanit Watthanaya | WCK Muay Thai: Road to WCK | Pala, California, US | KO (left knee) | 3 | 0:19 |
Defends the IKKC International Super Bantamweight Muay Thai Championship.
| 2010-12-19 | Loss | (China) Li Ning | WCK Muay Thai Super Bantamweight Tournament, Final | Haikou, China | Decision (unanimous) | 5 | 3:00 |
For the WCK Muay Thai Super Bantamweight (-55 kg/122 lb) Tournament Championship.
| 2010-12-18 | Win | (Portugal) Paulo da Silva | WCK Muay Thai Super Bantamweight Tournament, Semi Finals | Haikou, China | Decision (unanimous) | 5 | 3:00 |
| 2010-10-02 | Win | (Portugal) Paulo da Silva | WCK World Championship Muay Thai | Pala, California, US | Decision (unanimous) | 5 | 3:00 |
Defends the IKKC International Super Bantamweight Muay Thai Championship.
| 2010-04-03 | Win | (England) Andy Howson | Muay Thai in America | Santa Monica, California, US | Decision (split) | 5 | 3:00 |
| 2009-12-05 | Loss | (Japan) Kunitaka Fujiwara | WCK Muay Thai: King's Birthday | Primm, Nevada, US | TKO | 4 | 2:23 |
For the WBC Muaythai International Super Bantamweight (-55.338 kg/122 lb) Championship.
| 2009-07-25 | Win | (Portugal) Paulo da Silva | WCK World Championship Muay Thai | Las Vegas, Nevada, US | KO (low kick) | 4 | 0:26 |
Defends the IKKC International Super Bantamweight Muay Thai Championship and the WBC Muaythai United States Bantamweight (-53.524 kg/118 lb) Championship.
| 2008-07-26 | Loss | (Portugal) Paulo da Silva | WCK World Championship Muay Thai | Las Vegas, Nevada, US | TKO | 1 | 2:00 |
| 2007-11-29 | Win | (Japan) Hidemaru | WCK: Full Rules Muay Thai | Highland, California, US | Decision (unanimous) | 5 | 3:00 |
Wins the IKKC Intercontinental Featherweight Championship.
| 2007-09-08 | Win | (Japan) Hidemaru | World Championship Muay Thai | Gardena, California, US | Decision (unanimous) | 5 | 3:00 |
Wins the WBC Muaythai United States Featherweight (-57.153 kg/126 lb) Championship.
| 2005-09-24 | Win | (Canada) Kim Morris | Adrenaline III | Irvine, California, US | TKO | 1 | |
| 2005-03-25 | Win | (United States) Kevin Ross | | Las Vegas, Nevada, US | Decision | 5 | 3:00 |
| 2005-02-05 | Win | (United States) William Villanueva | | Las Vegas, Nevada, US | Decision (unanimous) | 5 | 3:00 |
| 2004-09-11 | Win | (United States) Antonio de la Cruz | | Las Vegas, Nevada, US | Decision (unanimous) | 5 | 3:00 |
Legend: Win Loss Draw/no contest Notes
