= List of WBC Muaythai diamond champions =

This is a list of WBC Muaythai diamond champions, showing diamond champions certificated by the World Boxing Council Muaythai (WBC Muaythai). The WBC, which is one of the four major governing bodies in professional boxing, started certifying their own Muay Thai world champions in 19 different weight classes in 2005.

== Middleweight ==
No.	Name	Date winning	Date losing	Days	Defenses
1	(Thailand) Phetmorakot Petchyindee Academy	October 4, 2019	July 2021	2339	0
Phetmorakot defeated Mohammad Siasarani (Iran) by KO (Knee to body) at 3R in Chiang Rai, Thailand.
2	(Belgium) Youssef Boughanem	July 17, 2021	Current	1687	0
Boughanem defeated Niclas Larsen (Denmark) by DEC (Unanimous) at 5R in Brussels, Belgium.

== Super welterweight ==
No.	Name	Date winning	Date losing	Days	Defenses
1	(Thailand) Buakaw Banchamek	August 15, 2014	Current	4215	0
Buakaw defeated Abdoul Karim Touré (France) by TKO (Referee stoppage: Right elbow strike) at 3R at Chiang Mai Rajabhat University in Chiang Mai Province, Thailand.

== Super lightweight ==
No.	Name	Date winning	Date losing	Days	Defenses
1	(Thailand) Saenchai PKSaenchaimuaythaigym	August 14, 2011	Current	5312	0
2	(Thailand) Singdam Kiatmuu9	July 27, 2019	Current	2408	0
Saenchai defeated Kevin Ross (USA) by majority decision(48-46/48-46/47-47) after 5R at Commerce Casino in Los Angeles, California, United States. This bout was also for the vacant title of MTAA world Super lightweight.

== Super Bantamweight ==
No.	Name	Date winning	Date losing	Days	Defenses
1	(United Kingdom) Ruth Ashdown	August 15, 2018	Retired with title	Retired after winning	0
Ashdown defeated Dokmaipa Kiatpompetch (Thailand) by Decision (Unanimous) at 5R in Hong Kong, China.

== See also ==
- List of WBC Muaythai world champions
- List of IBF Muaythai world champions
