= List of IBF Muaythai world champions =

This is a list of IBF Muay Thai world champions, showing every world champion certificated by the International Boxing Federation Muaythai (IBF Muay Thai). The IBF, which is one of the four major governing bodies in professional boxing, started certifying their own Muay Thai world champions in late 2017. The IBF is the second boxing organization to start certifying Muay Thai World champions following World Boxing Council (WBC).

== Middleweight (160lbs / 72.5kg) ==
No.	Name	Date winning	Date losing	Days	Defenses
1	(Belgium) (Morocco) Youssef Boughanem	April 28, 2018	Current	2775	0
Boughanem defeated Payakdum Extra Cole Film (Thailand) by TKO(Referee stoppage by forfeit) at 3R at Patong Boxing Stadium in Phuket, Thailand. Boughanem retained his Phoenix World Middleweight title too.

== Welterweight (147lbs / 66.7kg) ==
No.	Name	Date winning	Date losing	Days	Defenses
1	(Thailand) Pinklao Bangkoknoivillage	December 20, 2017	Current	2904	0
Pinklao defeated Pinngern Sithchefbuntam (Thailand) by decision in the event of "IBF Championship" at Suan Lum Night Bazaar in Bangkok, Thailand. He became the 1st IBF Muaythai champion in the history.

== Junior welterweight ==
No.	Name	Date winning	Date losing	Days	Defenses
1	(Thailand) Darky Lukmakamwan	February 13, 2018	Current	2849	0
Darky (aka Daakee) defeated Kayyasith Kiatcharoenchai (Thailand) by decision after 5R at Lumpinee Stadium in Bangkok, Thailand.

== Lightweight (135lbs/ 61.2kg) ==
No.	Name	Date winning	Date losing	Days	Defenses
1	(Thailand) Saeksan Or. Kwanmuang	December 21, 2017	Current	2903	0
Seksan (aka Seksan Or.Kwanmuang) defeated Phanpayak Sitchefboonthum (aka Panpayak Sitchefboontam) (Thailand) by decision in the event of "72nd Anniversary of Rajadamnern Stadium Memorial Event" at Rajadamnern Stadium in Bangkok, Thailand.

== Junior lightweight (130lbs /58.9kg) ==
No.	Name	Date winning	Date losing	Days	Defenses
1	(Thailand) Phet Utong Or. Kwanmuang	December 21, 2017	Current	2903	0
Petchaouthong (aka Pet-U-Tong Or. Kwanmuang) defeated Gaonar PK.Saenchaimuaythai (aka Kaonar PK.Saenchaimuaythai) (Thailand) by decision in the event of "72nd Anniversary of Rajadamnern Stadium Memorial Event" at Rajadamnern Stadium in Bangkok, Thailand. Petchaouthong retained his Rajadamnern Stadium lightweight title.

== Mini flyweight (105lbs /47.6kg) ==
No.	Name	Date winning	Date losing	Days	Defenses
1	(Japan) Nadaka Eiwasportsgym (Nadaka Yoshinari)	September 26, 2018	Current	2624	0
Nadaka defeated Roma Uddonmuang (Thailand) by TKO(Referee stoppage Left body shot) at 1R at "Chefboonthum" at Rajadamnern Stadium in Bangkok, Thailand. Nadaka was the current WBC Muaythai World Mini flyweight champion

== See also ==
- List of IBF world champions (boxing champions)
- List of WBC Muaythai world champions
- List of current world Muaythai champions
