= Haikou City Stadium =

Building in Haikou, China

Coordinates: 20.036083°N 110.314187°E

Haikou City Stadium 海口市体育馆
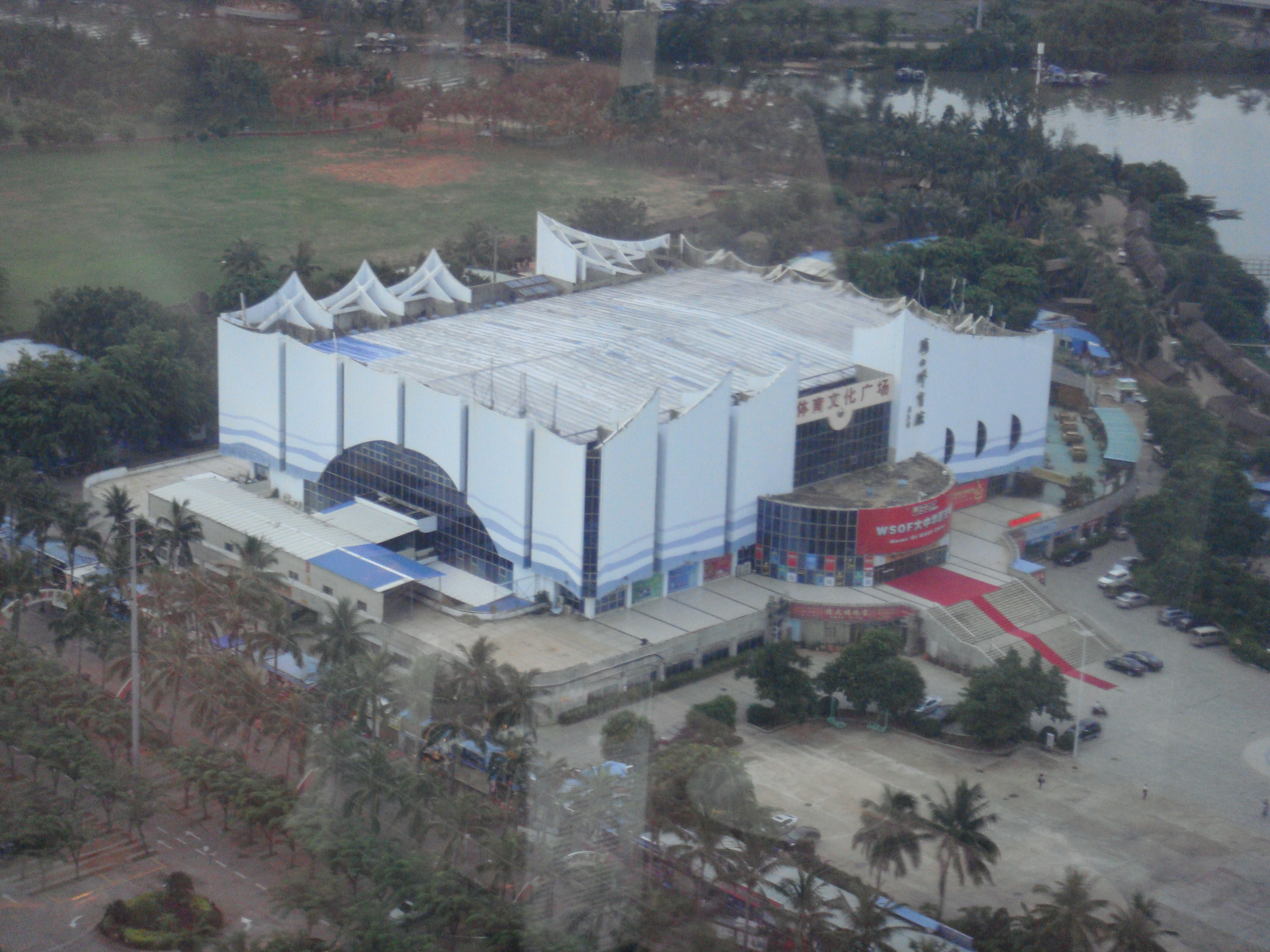
- Interactive map of Haikou City Stadium 海口市体育馆
- Location: Haikou, Hainan Province, China
- Capacity: 5,000

Haikou City Stadium (Chinese: 海口市体育馆) is located at the southeastern corner of Evergreen Park, Haikou, Hainan, China.
