= Yodbuangam Lukbanyai =

Thai Muay Thai fighter

- Born: Preecha Niamthai; May 25, 1982 (age 44); Din Daeng, Bangkok, Thailand
- Other names: Yodkeng Sor.Thephastin; Yodbuangarm Loogbanyai
- Nickname: Divine Son of Huai Khwang (เทพบุตรห้วยขวาง)
- Height: 1.74 m (5 ft 8 1/2 in)
- Division: Flyweight; Super Flyweight; Bantamweight; Super Bantamweight; Featherweight; Super Featherweight
- Style: Muay Thai
- Stance: Orthodox
- Team: Lukbanyai
- Trainer: Samrit Lukbanyai

Preecha Niamthai (Thai: ???; born May 25, 1982), known professionally as Yodbuangam Lukbanyai (Thai: ยอดบัวงาม ลูกบ้านใหญ่), is a Thai former Muay Thai fighter. He is a former Lumpinee Stadium and Thailand champion

== Biography and career ==
Yodbuangam fought for his entire career out of the Lukbanyai camp, training with stablemates champions Sanghiran Lukbanyai, Norasing Lukbanyai and Sarawut Lukbanyai. During his career Yodbuangam captured the Lumpinee Stadium Bantamweight title and the Thailand Super Featherweight title. He defeated many notable champions of his era such as Kangwanlek Petchyindee, Nungubon Sitlerchai, Phet-Ek Sitjaopho, Puja Sor.Suwanee, Orono Wor Petchpun, Attachai Fairtex, Kem Sitsongpeenong and Lerdsila Chumpairtour.

After retiring from high level competition, Yodbuangam became a trainer. He taught at the Watcharachai Gym and later at Evolve MMA in Singapore.

Yodbuangam had a short comeback in Bangkok. On August 24, 2018, he lost by knockout to Nikita Gerasimovich at Muax Xtreme. On January 20, 2019 he lost to Ignasi Alvez also by knockout on Muay Thai Super Champ.

== Titles and accomplishments ==
- Rangsit Stadium
  - Rangsit Stadium Flyweight (112 lbs) Champion
- Siam Omnoi Stadium
  - 1999 Omnoi Stadium Flyweight (112 lbs) Champion
- Lumpinee Stadium
  - 2003 Lumpinee Stadium Bantamweight (118 lbs) Champion
- Professional Boxing Association of Thailand (PAT)
  - 2005 Thailand Super Featherweight (130 lbs) Champion

== Fight record ==
Professional Muaythai record
127 Wins, 52 Losses, 3 Draws
Date	Result	Opponent	Event	Location	Method	Round	Time
2019-01-20	Loss	(Spain) Ignasi Alvez	Muay Thai Super Champ	Bangkok, Thailand	KO (Elbows)	3	1:16
2018-08-24	Loss	(Russia) Nikita Gerasimovich	Muay Xtreme	Bangkok, Thailand	KO (Punches)	2	
2009-02-17	Loss	(Thailand) Lerdsila Chumpairtour	Paianun, Lumpinee Stadium	Bangkok, Thailand	Decision	5	3:00
2009-01-24	Loss	(Thailand) Kaew Fairtex	Lumpinee Krikkrai, Lumpinee Stadium	Bangkok, Thailand	Decision	5	3:00
2008-12-27	Win	(Thailand) Lerdsila Chumpairtour	Lumpini Krikkrai, Lumpinee Stadium	Bangkok, Thailand	Decision	5	3:00
2008-10-25	Loss	(Thailand) Singdam Kiatmuu9	Lumpini Krikkrai, Lumpinee Stadium	Bangkok, Thailand	Decision	5	3:00
2008-09-16	Win	(Thailand) Pansak Luk Bor.Kor.	Praianan, Lumpinee Stadium	Bangkok, Thailand	Decision	5	3:00
2008-07-08	Win	(Thailand) Yutthajak Kaewsamrit	Pro.Pramuk, Lumpinee Stadium	Bangkok, Thailand	Decision	5	3:00
2008-04-29	Loss	(Thailand) Nong-O Gaiyanghadao	Praianan, Lumpinee Stadium	Bangkok, Thailand	Decision	5	3:00
2008-03-18	Loss	(Thailand) Singdam Kiatmuu9	Praianan, Lumpinee Stadium	Bangkok, Thailand	Decision	5	3:00
2006-03-06	Loss	(Thailand) Kem Sitsongpeenong	Onesongchai, Rajadamnern Stadium	Bangkok, Thailand	Decision	5	3:00
2006-02-07	Loss	(Thailand) Saenchainoi Nongkeesuwit	Paironan, Lumpinee Stadium	Bangkok, Thailand	Decision	5	3:00
2005-12-22	Win	(Thailand) Kem Sitsongpeenong	Rajadamnern Stadium 60th Anniversary	Bangkok, Thailand	TKO	2	
2005-09-20	Loss	(Thailand) Puja Sor.Suwanee	Por.Pramuk, Lumpinee Stadium	Bangkok, Thailand	KO (High kick)	3	
2005-08-11	Win	(Thailand) Attachai Fairtex	Onesongchai, Sanam Luang	Bangkok, Thailand	Decision	5	3:00
2005-05-13	Win	(Thailand) Sibmuen Laemthongkarnpet	Paianan, Lumpinee Stadium	Bangkok, Thailand	Decision	5	3:00
Wins the Thailand Super Featherweight (130 lbs) title.
2005-03-07	Win	(Thailand) Bovy Sor Udomson	Onesongchai, Rajadamnern Stadium	Bangkok, Thailand	TKO	2	
2004-12-29	Loss	(Thailand) Saenchai Sor.Kingstar	OneSongchai, Rajadamnern Stadium	Bangkok, Thailand	TKO (leg injury)	3	
2004-12-07	Win	(Thailand) Orono Wor Petchpun	Lumpinee Stadium Birthday Show	Bangkok, Thailand	Decision	5	3:00
2004-10-11	Win	(Thailand) Issarasak Chor.Ratchadakorn	Petchthongkam, Rajadamnern Stadium	Bangkok, Thailand	Decision	5	3:00
2004-09-17	Win	(Thailand) Nongbee Kiatyongyut	Paianan, Lumpinee Stadium	Bangkok, Thailand	Decision	5	3:00
2004-07-30	Win	(Thailand) Phet-Ek Sitjaopho	Por.Pramuk, Lumpinee Stadium	Bangkok, Thailand	KO (Right cross)	3	
2004-07-02	Win	(Thailand) Phetto Sitjaopho	Praianan, Lumpinee Stadium	Bangkok, Thailand	Decision	5	3:00
2004-05-14	Loss	(Thailand) Kongpipop Petchyindee	Fairtex, Lumpinee Stadium	Bangkok, Thailand	KO (Elbow)	4	
2004-03-04	Loss	(Thailand) Puja Sor.Suwanee	Onesongchai, Rajadamnern Stadium	Bangkok, Thailand	Decision	5	3:00
2004-01-13	Win	(Thailand) Puja Sor.Suwanee	Praianan, Lumpinee Stadium	Bangkok, Thailand	Decision	5	3:00
2003-09-07	Win	(Thailand) Phet-Ek Sitjaopho	Onesongchai, Rajadamnern Stadium	Bangkok, Thailand	Decision	5	3:00
2003-07-15	Win	(Thailand) Kongprai Por.Pinyo	Paianan, Lumpinee Stadium	Bangkok, Thailand	Decision	5	3:00
2003-04-22	Win	(Thailand) Chatree Sitpafah	Lumpinee Stadium	Bangkok, Thailand	Decision	5	3:00
Wins the vacant Lumpinee Stadium Bantamweight (118 lbs) title.
2002-12-03	Loss	(Thailand) Anuwat Kaewsamrit	Lumpinee Stadium Anniversary	Bangkok, Thailand	KO (Punches)	5	
2002-10-30	Loss	(Thailand) Watcharachai Kaewsamrit	Rajadamnern Stadium	Bangkok, Thailand	Decision	5	3:00
2002-09-10	Win	(Thailand) Sinchainoi Sor.Kittichai	Paianan, Lumpinee Stadium	Bangkok, Thailand	Decision	5	3:00
2002-	Draw	(Thailand) Kongpipop Petchyindee	Lumpinee Stadium	Bangkok, Thailand	Decision	5	3:00
2002-05-24	Win	(Thailand) Newsaencherng Jirakriangkrai	Wanboonya, Lumpinee Stadium	Bangkok, Thailand	Decision	5	3:00
2002-04-06	Loss	(Thailand) Chatree Sitpafah	Omnoi Stadium	Samut Sakhon, Thailand	Decision	5	3:00
2001-12-07		(Thailand) Fahsuchon Sit-O	Lumpinee Stadium	Bangkok, Thailand			
2001-05-25	Loss	(Thailand) Nontachai Sit-O	Phetsupapan, Lumpinee Stadium	Bangkok, Thailand	Decision	5	3:00
2001-04-10	Loss	(Thailand) Nontachai Sit-O	Lumpinee Stadium	Bangkok, Thailand	Decision	5	3:00
2001-03-23	Win	(Thailand) Chanrit Sit-O	Wanboonya, Lumpinee Stadium	Bangkok, Thailand	Decision	5	3:00
2001-02-06	Win	(Thailand) Nungubon Sitlerchai	Lumpinee Stadium	Bangkok, Thailand	Decision	5	3:00
2001-01-06	Loss	(Thailand) Chanrit Sit-O	Lumpinee Stadium	Bangkok, Thailand	Decision	5	3:00
2000-12-08	Loss	(Thailand) Watcharachai Kaewsamrit	Lumpinee Stadium	Bangkok, Thailand	Decision	5	3:00
For the vacant Thailand 122 lbs title and a 2.6 million baht side-bet.
2000-11-10	Win	(Thailand) Komsaen Thor.Sangkaew	Rajadamnern Stadium	Bangkok, Thailand	Decision	5	3:00
2000-10-10	Win	(Thailand) Newsaencherng Pinsinchai	Rajadamnern Stadium	Bangkok, Thailand	Decision	5	3:00
2000-09-05	Win	(Thailand) Duewa KongUdom	Rajadamnern Stadium	Bangkok, Thailand	Decision	5	3:00
2000-07-28	Loss	(Thailand) Newsaencherng Pinsinchai	Lumpinee Stadium	Bangkok, Thailand	Decision	5	3:00
2000-06-21	Win	(Thailand) Duewa KongUdom	Rajadamnern Stadium	Bangkok, Thailand	Decision	5	3:00
2000-04-11	Win	(Thailand) Rungrawee Sor.Ploenchit	Lumpinee Stadium	Bangkok, Thailand	Decision	5	3:00
2000-03-	Win	(Thailand) Sinchainoi Sor.Kittichai	Lumpinee Stadium	Bangkok, Thailand	Decision	5	3:00
2000-02-08	Win	(Thailand) Kangwanlek SitKruOd	Paianan, Lumpinee Stadium	Bangkok, Thailand	Decision	5	3:00
2000-01-	Win	(Thailand) Kangwanlek SitKruOd	Lumpinee Stadium	Bangkok, Thailand	Decision	5	3:00
1999-12-03	Win	(Thailand) Sitrak Asawathayothin	Lumpinee Stadium	Bangkok, Thailand	Decision	5	3:00
1999-10-04	Loss	(Thailand) Anuwat Kaewsamrit	Rajadamnern Stadium	Bangkok, Thailand	KO (Right cross)	3	
1999-	Win	(Thailand) Chatree Sitpafah	Omnoi Stadium	Samut Sakhon, Thailand	Decision	5	3:00
Wins the vacant Omnoi Stadium Flyweight (112 lbs) title.
1999-03-23	Loss	(Thailand) Petchawang Asawathin	Omnoi Stadium	Samut Sakhon, Thailand	KO (Uppercuts)	3	
For the Omnoi Stadium Light Flyweight (108 lbs) title.
1998-09-15	Win	(Thailand) Seemok Sor.Ploenchit	Kiatpetch, Lumpinee Stadium	Bangkok, Thailand	Decision	5	3:00
1998-06-09	Loss	(Thailand) Chokamnuay Sor.Ploenchit		Bangkok, Thailand	Decision	5	3:00
Legend: Win Loss Draw/No contest Notes
