= Kongpipop Petchyindee =

Thai former professional Muay Thai fighter

- Born: Churak Youngjohor; March 2, 1983 (age 43); Chaiyaphum, Thailand
- Other names: Kongpipop Sit Kru Od (ก้องพิภพ ศิษย์ครูอ๊อด); Kongpipop KingBoxing; Kongpipop Twinspecial (ก้องพิภพ ทวินสเปเชี่ยล)
- Nickname: Arrogant Death (มัจจุราชผยอง)
- Height: 170 cm (5 ft 7 in)
- Division: Featherweight; Lightweight
- Style: Muay Thai (???)
- Stance: Southpaw
- Team: Sit Kru Od; Petchyindee
- Trainer: Nonglek Sit Kru Od
- Years active: c. 1991–2009

Other information
- Occupation: Muay Thai trainer

Churak Youngjohor (Thai: ???; born March 2, 1983), known professionally as Kongpipop Petchyindee (Thai: ก้องพิภพ เพชรยินดี), is a Thai former professional Muay Thai fighter.

== Biography and career ==
Kongpipop started Muay Thai training at 8 years old. He joined the Sit Kru Od gym and competed in the Isan region before being brought to Bangkok at the age of 15. When the Sit Kru Od camp closed Kongpipop's trainer started to use the Petchyindee camp facilities where Kongpipop followed him.

In 2002 Kongpipop won the Toyota marathon tournament and the Thailand title at 126 lbs. He became an elite fighter on the Bangkok circuit and defeated notable champions in the following years such as Watcharachai Kaewsamrit, Nongbee Kiatyongyut, Lerdsila Chumpairtour, Orono Majestic Gym, Attachai Fairtex and Singdam Kiatmuu9. In 2005 Kongpipop was matched with the best fighter of his era Saenchai. He received a purse of 120,000 baht for this bout.

On September 27, 2003 Kongpipop travelled to Japan to face Tsogto Amara at AJKF KNOCK DOWN. He won the fight by unanimous decision.

The most significant accomplishment of Kongpipop's career came on November 17, 2006 when he won Gaiyanghadao Tournament, defeating three champions in one day. He defeated Singdam Kiatmuu9 on points in the quarter-finals, in semi finals he knocked out Attachai Fairtex and knocked out Nopparat Keatkhamtorn in the final to win the tournament.

Kongpipop travelled to France on November 29, 2009 to face Kamel Jemel for the WBC Muay Thai World Lightweight title. He won the fight by doctor stoppage due to a cut from an elbow in the first round.

In the later part of the 2000s Kongpipop became addicted to drugs and alcohol which led him to be incarcerated for a year in 2009. Following his release he returned to his native province before becoming a trainer at Petchyindee gym in 2016.

== Titles and accomplishments ==
- World Boxing Council Muay Thai
  - 2007 WBC Muay Thai World Lightweight (135 lbs) Champion
- Professional Boxing Association of Thailand (PAT)
  - 2002 Thailand Featherweight (126 lbs) Champion
- Lumpinee Stadium
  - 2004 Lumpinee Stadium Featherweight (126 lbs) Champion
- Tournaments
  - 2002 Toyota Marathon Featherweight (126 lbs) Tournament Winner
  - 2006 Gaiyanghadao Lightweight (135 lbs) Tournament Winner

== Fight record ==
Professional Muaythai record
Date	Result	Opponent	Event	Location	Method	Round	Time
2009-03-28	Win	(Sweden) Otmar Diagne	Battle of Sweden	Stockholm, Sweden	TKO (Doctor stoppage)	3	
2008-11-29	Win	(Thailand) Fasura Wor.Petchpun	Lumpinee Stadium	Bangkok, Thailand	KO	3	
2008-06-24	Loss	(Thailand) Petchmankong Petchfergus	Lumpinee Stadium	Bangkok, Thailand	KO	4	
2008-02-28	Loss	(Thailand) Fasura Wor.Petchpun	Sor.Sommai, Rajadamnern Stadium	Bangkok, Thailand	KO	3	
2007-11-29	Win	(France) Kamel Jemel	France VS Thailande	Paris, France	TKO (Doctor stoppage)	1	
Wins the WBC Muay Thai World Lightweight (135 lbs) title.
2007-07-20	Loss	(Thailand) Khem Sor.Ploenchit	Sor.Pumpanmuang, Lumpinee Stadium	Bangkok, Thailand	TKO	5	
2007-02-06	Loss	(Thailand) Attachai Fairtex	Fairtex, Lumpinee Stadium	Bangkok, Thailand	Decision	5	3:00
2006-11-17	Win	(Thailand) Nopparat Keatkhamtorn	Gaiyanghadao Tournament, Final	Nakhon Ratchasima, Thailand	KO (Knees)	2	
Wins the Gaiyanghadao Tournament Lightweight (135 lbs) title.
2006-11-17	Win	(Thailand) Attachai Fairtex	Gaiyanghadao Tournament, Semi-final	Nakhon Ratchasima, Thailand	KO (Knees)	2	
2006-11-17	Win	(Thailand) Singdam Kiatmuu9	Gaiyanghadao Tournament, Quarter-final	Nakhon Ratchasima, Thailand	Decision	3	3:00
2006-08-29	Loss	(Thailand) Sagatpetch IngramGym	Wanboonya, Lumpinee Stadium	Bangkok, Thailand	Decision	5	3:00
2006-08-08	Win	(Thailand) Samranchai 96Peenang	Fairtex, Lumpinee Stadium	Bangkok, Thailand	Decision	5	3:00
2006-05-23	Loss	(Thailand) Attachai Fairtex	Fairtex, Lumpinee Stadium	Bangkok, Thailand	Decision	5	3:00
2006-04-04	Win	(Thailand) Petchnueng Sit Or	Kiatpetch, Lumpinee Stadium	Bangkok, Thailand	KO	4	
2006-02-10	Win	(Thailand) Banpot Sor.Boonya	Fairtex, Lumpinee Stadium	Bangkok, Thailand	KO	4	
2005-11-15	Loss	(Thailand) Singdam Kiatmuu9	Lumpinee Stadium	Bangkok, Thailand	Decision	5	3:00
2005-09-06	Loss	(Thailand) Saenchai Sor.Khamsing	Petchyindee, Lumpini Stadium	Bangkok, Thailand	Decision	5	3:00
2005-07-19	Win	(Thailand) Orono Majestic Gym	Petchyindee, Lumpinee Stadium	Bangkok, Thailand	Decision	5	3:00
2005-06-17	Win	(Thailand) Nopparat Keatkhamtorn	Wanboonya, Lumpinee Stadium	Bangkok, Thailand	KO	2	
2005-05-05	Win	(Thailand) Sagatpetch Sor.Sakulpan	Petchthongkham + Petchyindee, Rajadamnern Stadium	Bangkok, Thailand	Decision	5	3:00
2005-02-22	Win	(Thailand) Sailom Rachanon	Wanboonya + Petchpiya, Lumpinee Stadium	Bangkok, Thailand	Decision	5	3:00
2005-01-21	Win	(Thailand) Sagatpetch Sor.Sakulpan	Wanboonya, Lumpinee Stadium	Bangkok, Thailand	Decision	5	3:00
2004-12-07	Loss	(Thailand) Nopparat Keatkhamtorn	Lumpinee Stadium	Bangkok, Thailand	Decision	5	3:00
Loses the Lumpinee Stadium Featherweight (126 lbs) title.
2004-11-12	Win	(Thailand) Pornpithak Phet-Udomchai	Fairtex, Lumpinee Stadium	Bangkok, Thailand	Decision	5	3:00
Wins the Lumpinee Stadium Featherweight (126 lbs) title.
2004-10-15	Draw	(Thailand) Orono Majestic Gym	Petchpiya, Lumpinee Stadium	Bangkok, Thailand	Decision	5	3:00
2004-08-24	Win	(Thailand) Sibmuen Laemthongkhaet	Fairtex, Lumpinee Stadium	Bangkok, Thailand	Decision	5	3:00
2004-06-17	Loss	(Thailand) Anuwat Kaewsamrit	Daorungchujarean, Rajadamnern Stadium	Bangkok, Thailand	TKO (leg kicks)	2	
2004-05-14	Win	(Thailand) Yodbuangam Lukbanyai	Fairtex, Lumpinee Stadium	Bangkok, Thailand	KO (Elbow)	4	
2004-04-23	Win	(Thailand) Charlie Sor Chaitamil	Wanboonya, Lumpinee Stadium	Bangkok, Thailand	KO	3	
2004-03-26	Win	(Thailand) Orono Majestic Gym	Petchyindee + Weerapon, Lumpinee Stadium	Bangkok, Thailand	Decision	5	3:00
2004-02-24	Draw	(Thailand) Orono Majestic Gym	Petchyindee + Weerapon, Lumpinee Stadium	Bangkok, Thailand	Decision	5	3:00
2004-01-24	Loss	(Thailand) Singdam Kiatmuu9	Lumpinee Stadium	Bangkok, Thailand	Decision	5	3:00
For the Thailand Featherweight (126 lbs) title.
2003-12-18	Win	(Thailand) Lerdsila Chumpairtour	Daorungchujaroen, Rajadamnern Stadium	Bangkok, Thailand	Decision	5	3:00
2003-09-27	Win	(Mongolia) Tsogto Amara	All Japan Kickboxing Federation KNOCK DOWN	Tokyo, Japan	Decision	5	3:00
2003-07-29	Loss	(Thailand) Singdam Kiatmuu9	Lumpinee Stadium	Bangkok, Thailand	Decision	5	3:00
2003-06-13	Win	(Thailand) Khunpinit Kiattawan	Petchpiya, Lumpinee Stadium	Bangkok, Thailand	Decision	5	3:00
Wins the 2 million baht side-bet.
2003-04-26	Win	(Thailand) Nongbee Kiatyongyut	OneSongchai	Chachoengsao, Thailand	Decision	5	3:00
2003-02-07	Loss	(Thailand) Orono Majestic Gym		Bangkok, Thailand	Decision	5	3:00
2002-12-	Win	(Thailand) Charlie Sor Chaitamil	Lumpinee Stadium	Bangkok, Thailand	Decision	5	3:00
2002-12-03	Win	(Thailand) Watcharachai Kaewsamrit	Lumpinee Stadium Anniversary	Bangkok, Thailand	Decision	5	3:00
2002-11-	Win	(Thailand) Sinchainoi Sor.Kittichai	Lumpinee Stadium	Bangkok, Thailand	KO	1	
2002-	Win	(Thailand) Ekasit Sitkriangkrai	Lumpinee Stadium	Bangkok, Thailand	Decision	5	3:00
2002-	Win	(Thailand) Thanongsak Sit-O	Lumpinee Stadium	Bangkok, Thailand	KO	1	
2002-09-27	Loss	(Thailand) Sanghiran Lukbanyai	Petchyindee, Lumpinee Stadium	Bangkok, Thailand	Decision	5	3:00
2002-09-06	Win	(Thailand) Charlie Sor Chaitamil	Lumpinee Stadium	Bangkok, Thailand	Decision	5	3:00
Wins the Thailand Featherweight (126 lbs) title.
2002-	Win	(Thailand) Pornpitak Petchudomchai	Lumpinee Stadium	Bangkok, Thailand	Decision	5	3:00
2002-06-01	Loss	(Thailand) Kwanjai Sit Punpantung	Lumpinee Stadium	Bangkok, Thailand	Decision	5	3:00
2002-05-03	Win	(Thailand) Dokmaifai Tor.Sitthichai	Lumpinee Stadium	Bangkok, Thailand	KO (Punches)	2	
2002-	Loss	(Thailand) Fahsuchon Sit-O	Lumpinee Stadium	Bangkok, Thailand	TKO	3	
2002-	Draw	(Thailand) Yodbuangam Lukbanyai	Lumpinee Stadium	Bangkok, Thailand	Decision	5	3:00
2001-11-02	Loss	(Thailand) Anuwat Kaewsamrit	Lumpinee Stadium	Bangkok, Thailand	KO (Punches)	3	
2001-06-08	Loss	(Thailand) Phutawan Burirampukeafi	Lumpinee Stadium	Bangkok, Thailand	KO	3	3:00
?	Win	(Thailand) Sod Looknongyangtoy	Lumpinee Stadium	Bangkok, Thailand	KO (Right hook)	2	
2000-12-02	Loss	(Thailand) Pokaew Sitchafuang	Omnoi Stadium - Isuzu Cup	Samut Sakhon, Thailand	Decision	5	3:00
Legend: Win Loss Draw/No contest Notes
