= Orono Wor Petchpun =

Thai Muay Thai fighter

Orono Wor.Petchpun
- Born: Ophas Iamsaard; August 22, 1978 (age 48); Suphan Buri, Thailand
- Native name: โอภาส เอี่ยมสอาด
- Other names: Orono Majestic Gym (โอโรโน่ มาเจสติกยิม); Orono Sitjepayao (โอโรโน่ ศิษย์เจ๊พเยาว์)
- Nickname: Three Os of Suphan Buri (สามโอเมืองสุพรรณ)
- Height: 175 cm (5 ft 9 in)
- Division: Super Bantamweight; Featherweight; Super Featherweight; Super Lightweight; Welterweight
- Style: Muay Thai (Muay Khao)
- Stance: Southpaw
- Fighting out of: Nakhon Ratchasima, Thailand
- Team: Evolve MMA; Wor.Petchpun Gym; Majestic Gym
- Trainer: Waipot Petchpun
- Years active: c. 1993–present

Kickboxing record
- Total: 159
- Wins: 120
- By knockout: 20
- Losses: 36
- Draws: 3

Other information
- Occupation: Muay Thai trainer

Ophas Iamsaard (Thai: โอภาส เอี่ยมสอาด, born August 22, 1978), known professionally as Orono Wor.Petchpun (Thai: โอโรโน่ ว.เพชรพูล) is a Thai former professional Muay Thai fighter and kickboxer. He is a former Lumpinee Stadium champion, three-time Thailand champion, a WMC champion, and a It's Showtime 65MAX World champion. Since his retirement, he has worked as a trainer at various camps such as Evolve MMA.

== Biography and career ==
Orono started out Muay Thai at the age of 15, a fairly late age to start fighting in Thailand. A year later he had his first fight in Bangkok. In 2001 he won the WMC World Muaythai (122 lb) title against Petchek Sor Suwannapakdee.

Formerly fighting under the name Orono Majestic Gym (โอโรโน่ มาเจสติกยิม), Orono has mixed it up with many of the top names in muay thai. He holds two KO wins over The Contender Asia champion Yodsaenklai Fairtex, two decisions over K-1 MAX champion Buakaw Por. Pramuk and Saenchai Sor Kingstar. After fighting all the big names in Thailand at his weight class, Orono made his international debut in 2007 at the SLAMM Nederland vs Thailand III event against William Diender.

In March 2012, Orono announced his intention to compete in mixed martial arts.

== Titles and accopmplishments ==
Muay Thai

- World Muaythai Council
  - 2001 WMC Super Bantamweight (122 lbs) World Champion
- Professional Boxing Association of Thailand (PAT)
  - 2002 Thailand Featherweight (126 lbs) Champion
  - 2009 Thailand Super Featherweight (130 lbs) Champion
- Lumpinee Stadium
  - 2002 Lumpinee Stadium Fighter of the Year
  - 2007 Lumpinee Stadium Super Featherweight (130 lbs) Champion
- World Professional Muaythai Federation
  - 2008 WPMF Muay Thai Super Lightweight (140 lbs) World Champion

Kickboxing

- It's Showtime
  - 2009 It's Showtime 65MAX World Champion
    - One successful title defense

== Fight record ==
Muay Thai and Kickboxing record
120 Wins (21 (T) KO's), 36 Losses, 3 Draws
Date	Result	Opponent	Event	Location	Method	Round	Time
2010-12-04	Loss	(Thailand) Tuantong Pumphanmuang	Omnoi Stadium	Bangkok, Thailand	Decision	5	3:00
2010-09-09	Win	(Thailand) Janrob Sakhomsin	Wanmitchai, Rajadamnern Stadium	Bangkok, Thailand	Decision	5	3:00
2010-08-01	Loss	(Thailand) Singdam Kiatmuu9	Muay Lok 2010 Grand Stage	Tokyo, Japan	Decision (Majority)	5	3:00
2010-05-29	Win	(Armenia) Atty Gol	It's Showtime 2010 Amsterdam	Amsterdam, Netherlands	Decision (5-0)	5	3:00
Defends the It's Showtime 65MAX World title.
2010-04-10	Win	(France) Damien Alamos	Sherdana K-1 Gala	Sardinia, Italy	KO (Left elbow )	2	
2010-03-13	Win	(Slovakia) Egon Racs	Oktagon presents: It's Showtime 2010	Milan, Italy	TKO (Doctor Stoppage)	3	
2010-02-10	Loss	(Thailand) Petchboonchu FA Group	Daorungprabat, Rajadamnern Stadium	Bangkok, Thailand	Decision	5	3:00
2009-12-19	Win	(Thailand) Panpetch Chor Nah Phattalung	Rang Yeh Tournament finals	Bangkok, Thailand	Decision	5	3:00
Wins the Thailand Super-featherweight (130 lbs) title.
2009-11-14	Win	(Thailand) Lerdsila Chumpairtour	Krikkrai, Lumpinee	Bangkok, Thailand	Decision	5	3:00
2009-09-26	Win	(Thailand) Pettanong Petfergus	Krikkrai, Lumpinee	Bangkok, Thailand	Decision	5	3:00
2009-08-01	Win	(Thailand) Singdam Kiatmuu9	Lumpini Stadium	Bangkok, Thailand	Decision (Unanimous)	5	3:00
2009-06-20	Win	(Thailand) Tuanthong Phunphanmoung	Lumpini Stadium	Bangkok, Thailand	Decision (Unanimous)	5	3:00
2009-05-16	Win	(Belgium) Hassan El Hamzaoui	It's Showtime 2009 Amsterdam	Amsterdam, Netherlands	Decision (Unanimous)	5	3:00
Wins the It's Showtime 65MAX World title.
2009-03-28	Win	(South Africa) Warren Stevelmans	Battle of Sweden	Stockholm, Sweden	Decision (Unanimous)	5	3:00
2009-02-24	Loss	(Thailand) Nong-O Sit Or	Por.Pramuk, Lumpinee Stadium	Bangkok, Thailand	Decision (3-2)	5	3:00
2009-01-25	Win	(Thailand) Petchmankong Phetfocus	Channel 7 Stadium	Thailand	Decision (Unanimous)	5	3:00
2008-11-29	Loss	(Morocco) Faldir Chahbari	It's Showtime 2008 Eindhoven	Eindhoven, Netherlands	Decision (Majority)	3	3:00
2008-09-30	Loss	(Thailand) Saenchainoi Toyotarayong	Lumpini Krikrai, Lumpinee Stadium	Bangkok, Thailand	Decision	5	3:00
2008-08-03	Win	(Japan) Atsushi Suzuki	Kickboxing vs Muay Thai - Target 1st -	Tokyo, Japan	KO	2	
2008-07-15	Win	(Thailand) Sarawut Lookbaanyai	Phetpiya, Lumpinee Stadium	Bangkok, Thailand	Decision (Unanimous)	5	3:00
2008-05-02	Loss	(Thailand) Saenchai Sor Kingstar	Suklumpini Kriekrai, Lumpinee Stadium	Bangkok, Thailand	Decision (Unanimous)	5	3:00
Loses the Lumpinee Stadium Super Featherweight (130 lbs) title.
2008-02-26	Win	(Thailand) Petchmankong Sit Or	Por Pramuk, Lumpinee Stadium	Bangkok, Thailand	Decision (Unanimous)	5	3:00
2008-01-28	Win	(Brazil) Alex Cobra		Suphan Buri, Thailand	KO (Left elbow)	1	2:24
Wins the vacant WPMF Light Welterweight (140lbs) World title.
2007-12-07	Win	(Thailand) Saenchai Sor Kingstar	Suklumpini Kriekrai, Lumpinee Stadium	Bangkok, Thailand	Decision (Unanimous)	5	3:00
Wins the Lumpinee Stadium Super Featherweight (130 lbs) title.
2007-10-06	Draw	(Thailand) Petchmankong Phetfocus	Lumpinee Stadium	Bangkok, Thailand	Decision	5	3:00
2007-09-18	Win	(Thailand) Petchtaksin Sor Thampetch	Lumpinee Stadium	Bangkok, Thailand	Decision	5	3:00
2007-08-04	Win	(Thailand) Lerdsila Chumpairtour	Lumpinee Stadium	Bangkok, Thailand	Decision	5	3:00
2007-05-25	Win	(Thailand) Petchmankong Sit Or	Phetyindee, Lumpinee Stadium	Bangkok, Thailand	Decision	5	3:00
2007-05-06	Win	(Netherlands) William Diender	SLAMM Nederland vs Thailand III	Haarlem, Netherlands	KO (Left roundkick)	1	1:58
2007-02-06	Win	(Thailand) Petchmankong Sit Or	Fairtext, Lumpinee Stadium	Bangkok, Thailand	Decision	5	3:00
2006-12-22	Loss	(Thailand) Singdam Kiatmuu9	Phetyindee, Lumpinee Stadium	Bangkok, Thailand	Decision	5	3:00
2006-11-17	Loss	(Thailand) Nopparat Keatkhamtorn	Gai Yang Haadao Marathon tournament, Semifinals	Nakhon Ratchasima, Isan	Decision (Unanimous)	3	3:00
2006-11-17	Win	(Thailand) Duangsompong Kor Sapaothong	GaiYangHaadao Marathon tournament, Quarterfinals	Nakhon Ratchasima, Isan	Decision (Unanimous)	3	3:00
2006-09-01	Win	(Thailand) Singdam Kiatmuu9	Por.Pramuk, Lumpinee Stadium	Bangkok, Thailand	Decision	5	3:00
2006-08-08	Win	(Thailand) Kaew Fairtex	Fairtex, Lumpinee Stadium	Bangkok, Thailand	Decision	5	3:00
2006-07-04	Loss	(Thailand) Duangsompong Kor.Sapaotong	Paianun, Lumpinee Stadium	Bangkok, Thailand	TKO	2	
2006-05-30	Win	(Thailand) Duangsompong Kor.Sapaotong	Changsiamchai, Lumpinee Stadium	Bangkok, Thailand	Decision	5	3:00
2006-05-05	Loss	(Thailand) Singdam Kiatmuu9	Paianun, Lumpinee Stadium	Bangkok, Thailand	Decision	5	3:00
2006-03-24	Win	(Thailand) Attachai Fairtex	Wanboonya, Lumpinee Stadium	Bangkok, Thailand	Decision (Unanimous)	5	3:00
2006-02-10	Win	(Thailand) Teelek Fairtex	Fairtex, Lumpinee Stadium	Bangkok, Thailand	Decision (Unanimous)	5	3:00
2005-11-04	Loss	(Thailand) Saenchai Sor Kingstar	Fairtex, Lumpinee Stadium	Bangkok, Thailand	Decision (Unanimous)	5	3:00
2005-09-27	Win	(Thailand) Banput Sor Boonya	Wanboonya, Lumpinee Stadium	Bangkok, Thailand	Decision (Unanimous)	5	3:00
2005-07-19	Loss	(Thailand) Kongpipop Petchyindee	Petchyindee, Lumpinee Stadium	Bangkok, Thailand	Decision	5	3:00
2005-06-10	Win	(Thailand) Sagatpetch Sor.Sakulpan	Petchpiya, Lumpinee Stadium	Bangkok, Thailand	Decision	5	3:00
2005-05-06	Loss	(Thailand) Singdam Kiatmuu9	Petchyindee, Lumpinee Stadium	Bangkok, Thailand	Decision (Unanimous)	5	3:00
For the vacant Lumpinee Stadium and Thailand Super Featherweight (130 lbs) titles.
2005-03-18	Loss	(Thailand) Nopparat Keatkhamtorn	Petchyindee & Sapaotong, Lumpinee Stadium	Bangkok, Thailand	Decision (Unanimous)	5	3:00
2005-01-21	Win	(Thailand) Yodsaenklai Fairtex	Wanboonya, Lumpinee Stadium	Bangkok, Thailand	TKO (Knee strikes)	3	
2004-12-07	Loss	(Thailand) Yodbuangam Lukbanyai	Lumpinee Stadium Birthday Show	Bangkok, Thailand	Decision (Unanimous)	5	3:00
2004-10-15	Draw	(Thailand) Kongpipop Petchyindee	Petchpiya, Lumpinee Stadium	Bangkok, Thailand	Decision draw	5	3:00
2004-09-14	Win	(Thailand) Singdam Kiatmuu9	Petchpiya, Lumpinee Stadium	Bangkok, Thailand	Decision (Unanimous)	5	3:00
2004-08-10	Win	(Thailand) Singdam Kiatmuu9	Petchyindee, Lumpinee Stadium	Bangkok, Thailand	Decision (Unanimous)	5	3:00
2004-07-09	Win	(Thailand) Sagatpetch Sor.Sakulpan	Petchpiya, Lumpinee Stadium	Bangkok, Thailand	Decision (Unanimous)	5	3:00
2004-05-28	Win	(Thailand) Sibmean Lamtongkarnpat	Petchyindee, Lumpinee Stadium	Bangkok, Thailand	Decision (Unanimous)	5	3:00
2004-05-04	Win	(Thailand) Yodsaenklai Fairtex	Petchyindee, Lumpinee Stadium	Bangkok, Thailand	TKO (Elbows and Punches)	4	
2004-03-26	Loss	(Thailand) Kongpipop Petchyindee	Petchyindee & Wanwerapon, Lumpinee Stadium	Bangkok, Thailand	Decision	5	3:00
2004-02-24	Draw	(Thailand) Kongpipop Petchyindee	Petchyindee & Wanwerapon, Lumpinee Stadium	Bangkok, Thailand	Decision	5	3:00
2004-01-29	Win	(Thailand) Noppakao Sor Wanchard	Daorungchujarean, Rajadamnern Stadium	Bangkok, Thailand	Decision	5	3:00
2003-11-14	Loss	(Thailand) Isorasak Jor.Rajadakorn	Lumpinee Superights, Lumpinee Stadium	Bangkok, Thailand	Decision	5	3:00
2003-09-19	Loss	(Thailand) Chalermpon Kiatsununtha	Lumpinee Stadium	Bangkok, Thailand	Decision	5	3:00
For the vacant Thailand Featherweight (126 lbs) title.
2003-08-22	Loss	(Thailand) Singdam Kiatmuu9	Petchpiya, Lumpinee Stadium	Bangkok, Thailand	Decision	5	3:00
For the Thailand Super Bantamweight (122 lbs) title.
2003-06-13	Win	(Thailand) Nongbee Kiatyongyut	Petchpiya, Rajadamnern Stadium	Bangkok, Thailand	Decision	5	3:00
2003-03-26	Loss	(Thailand) Singdam Kiatmuu9	Petchyindee, Lumpinee Stadium	Bangkok, Thailand	Decision	5	3:00
2003-02-07	Win	(Thailand) Kongpipop Petchyindee	Petchyindee, Lumpinee Stadium	Bangkok, Thailand	Decision	5	3:00
2002-12-03	Loss	(Thailand) Nontachai Kiatwanlop	Lumpinee Stadium	Bangkok, Thailand	Decision	5	3:00
For the Thailand Super Featherweight (130 lbs) title.
2002-	Loss	(Thailand) Singdam Kiatmuu9		Bangkok, Thailand	Decision	5	3:00
Loses the Thailand Featherweight (126 lbs) title.
2002-09-06	Win	(Thailand) Tongthai Por Burapha	Lumpinee Stadium	Bangkok, Thailand	Decision	5	3:00
Wins the Thailand Featherweight (126 lbs) title.
2002-08-06	Win	(Thailand) Nontachai Kiatwanlop	Petchyindee, Lumpinee Stadium	Bangkok, Thailand	Decision	5	3:00
2002-07-05	Draw	(Thailand) Nontachai Kiatwanlop	Petchyindee, Lumpinee Stadium	Bangkok, Thailand	Decision	5	3:00
2002-05-10	Win	(Thailand) Buakaw Por.Pramuk	Lumpinee Stadium	Bangkok, Thailand	Decision	5	3:00
2002-03-22	Win	(Thailand) Chanrit Sit-O	Lumpinee Stadium	Bangkok, Thailand	Decision	5	3:00
2001-08-07	Win	(Thailand) Buakaw Por.Pramuk	Lumpinee Stadium	Bangkok, Thailand	Decision	5	3:00
2001-07-08	Win	(Thailand) Chinarat Watcharin	Channel 7 Stadium	Bangkok, Thailand	Decision	5	3:00
2001-	Win	(Thailand) Yodkatanyu Sakmontri	Lumpinee Stadium	Bangkok, Thailand	KO (Elbows)	4	
2001-02-17	Win	(Thailand) Phetarun Sor.Suwanpakdee	Lumpinee Stadium	Bangkok, Thailand	Decision	5	3:00
Wins the WMC Muay Thai Super Bantamweight (122 lbs) World title.
2000-12-	Win	(Thailand) Ekasit Sitkriengkrai	Lumpinee Stadium	Bangkok, Thailand	TKO	5	
2000-11-	Loss	(Thailand) Duwa Kong-Udom	Lumpinee Stadium	Bangkok, Thailand	Decision	5	3:00
2000-10-	Win	(Thailand) Chanrit Sit-O	Lumpinee Stadium	Bangkok, Thailand	Decision	5	3:00
2000-09-13	Loss	(Thailand) Watcharachai Kaewsamrit	Lumpinee Stadium	Bangkok, Thailand	Decision	5	3:00
2000-08-	Win	(Thailand) Kotchasarn Singklongsi	Lumpinee Stadium	Bangkok, Thailand	Decision	5	3:00
2000-07-	Win	(Thailand) Charlie Sor.Chaitamil	Lumpinee Stadium	Bangkok, Thailand	Decision	5	3:00
2000-06-	Win	(Thailand) Theparat Kiatnoppadon	Lumpinee Stadium	Bangkok, Thailand	Decision	5	3:00
2000-05-	Loss	(Thailand) Duwa Kong-Udom	Lumpinee Stadium	Bangkok, Thailand	Decision	5	3:00
2000-04-	Win	(Thailand) Chinarat Watcharin	Lumpinee Stadium	Bangkok, Thailand	Decision	5	3:00
2000-03-10	Win	(Thailand) Rattanakiat Tor.Rattanakiat	Petchyindee, Lumpinee Stadium	Bangkok, Thailand	Decision	5	3:00
2000-02-	Win	(Thailand) Thanasak Wanchalerm	Rajadamnern Stadium	Bangkok, Thailand	Decision	5	3:00
2000-01-18	Win	(Thailand) Chinarat Watcharin	Lumpinee Stadium	Bangkok, Thailand	Decision	5	3:00
1999-10-19	Loss	(Thailand) Sakchai Rungruangbua	Petchyindee, Lumpinee Stadium	Bangkok, Thailand	Decision	5	3:00
1999-09-11	Loss	(Thailand) Chinarat Watcharin		Songkhla, Thailand	Decision	5	3:00
1999-08-03	Win	(Thailand) Dokmaifai Tor.Sittichai	Chatuchok, Lumpinee Stadium	Bangkok, Thailand	Decision	5	3:00
1999-07-09	Win	(Thailand) Yodkatayu Aor.Vichitphan	Lumpinee Stadium	Bangkok, Thailand	Decision	5	3:00
1999-05-28	Win	(Thailand) Charlie Sor.Chaitamil	Petchyindee, Lumpinee Stadium	Bangkok, Thailand	Decision	5	3:00
1999-04-20	Win	(Thailand) Yodkatanyu Aor.Wichitphan	Petchyindee, Lumpinee Stadium	Bangkok, Thailand	Decision	5	3:00
1998-12-	Win	(Thailand) Phetek Sor.Suwanpakdee	Lumpinee Stadium	Bangkok, Thailand	Decision	5	3:00
1998-08-03	Win	(Thailand) Dokmaifai Tor.Sittichai	Chatuchok, Lumpinee Stadium	Bangkok, Thailand	Decision	5	3:00
1998-06-30	Win	(Thailand) Sakchai Rungruangbua	Majestic, Lumpinee Stadium	Bangkok, Thailand	KO (High kick)	4	
1998-04-23	Win	(Thailand) Newsaencherng Pinsinchai	Rangsit Stadium	Thailand	Decision	5	3:00
1998-03-02	Loss	(Thailand) Chaichana Dechtawee	Lumpinee Stadium	Bangkok, Thailand	Decision	5	3:00
1998-02-06	Win	(Thailand) Petch-Ek Sor.Suwanpakdee	Majestic, Lumpinee Stadium	Bangkok, Thailand	Decision	5	3:00
1997-11-27	Win	(Thailand) Rotnarong Daopadriew	Rajadamnern Stadium	Bangkok, Thailand	Decision	5	3:00
1997-06-30	Win	(Thailand) Saenkrainoi SeriFarm	Aswindam, Rajadamnern Stadium	Bangkok, Thailand	Decision	5	3:00
1997-05-17	Loss	(Thailand) Rotnarong Daopadriew	Aswindam, Rajadamnern Stadium	Bangkok, Thailand	Decision	5	3:00
1996-10-31	Win	(Thailand) Saenkrainoi SeriFarm	Rajadamnern Stadium	Bangkok, Thailand	Decision	5	3:00
1996-10-09	Win	(Thailand) Darathai Narupai	Aswindam, Rajadamnern Stadium	Bangkok, Thailand	Decision	5	3:00
Legend: Win Loss Draw/No contest Notes

== See also ==
- List of It's Showtime champions
- List of male kickboxers
