= Nongbee Kiatyongyut =

Thai former professional Muay Thai fighter and boxer

Nongbee
- Born: Adisak Duangyai; July 16, 1981 (age 45); Chian Yai, (now Chaloem Phra Kiat), Nakhon Si Thammarat, Thailand
- Native name: อดศักดิ์ ดวงใหญ่
- Other names: Nong-B
- Nickname: NongBee
- Height: 172 cm (5 ft 8 in)
- Division: Mini Flyweight; Super Flyweight; Bantamweight; Super Bantamweight; Featherweight; Lightweight
- Style: Muay Thai (Muay Khao)
- Stance: Southpaw
- Years active: c. 1991–2018

Professional boxing record
- Total: 3
- Wins: 3
- By knockout: 2
- Losses: 0

Kickboxing record
- Total: 159
- Wins: 102
- Losses: 49
- Draws: 8

Other information
- Occupation: Muay Thai trainer
- Website: Nongbeemuaythai.com
- Boxing record from BoxRec

Adisak Duangyai (Thai: อดศักดิ์ ดวงใหญ่; born July 16, 1981), known professionally as Nongbee Kiatyongyut (Thai: น้องบี เกียรติยงยุทธ), is a Thai former professional Muay Thai fighter and boxer. He is a former two-division Lumpinee Stadium champion who was famous during the 1990s and 2000s.

== Biography and career ==
Nongbee started Muay Thai training at 10 years old at home, he joined the Kiatyongyut gym in Bangkok two years later. He won his first title at 17 years old, defeating Yodsaenchai Sityodtong for the Lumpinee Stadium 105 lbs belt. He also won the 118 lbs title in 1997 against Denthoranee Nakontongpakyu. In 2000 he captured the WMC World 126 lbs title.

Nongbee was a popular fighter of the 2000s reaching purses of 100,000 baht. Throughout his career he defeated notable champions such as Thongchai Tor.Silachai, Watcharachai Kaewsamrit, Phet-Ek Sitjaopho, Kem Sitsongpeenong, Attachai Fairtex, Anuwat Kaewsamrit, Bovy Sor Udomson or Saenchai Sor.Khamsing.

On July 18, 2011, Nongbee had an unexpected opportunity to fight for the Rajadamnern Stadium 135 lbs title after he transitioned to boxing months prior. He lost the fight by decision and retired from high level competition soon after. He kept fighting occasionally in the provinces.

== Titles and accomplishments ==
- World MuayThai Council
  - 2000 WMC World Featherweight (126 lbs) Champion
- Lumpinee Stadium
  - 1997 Lumpinee Stadium Mini Flyweight (105 lbs) Champion
  - 2000 Lumpinee Stadium Bantamweight (118 lbs) Champion

== Fight record ==
Professional Muaythai record
≈102 Wins, 49 Losses, 8 Draws
Date	Result	Opponent	Event	Location	Method	Round	Time
2018-12-01	Win	(France) Tarek Guermoudi		France			
2015-12-	Win	(Thailand)		Ko Samui, Thailand	KO		
2015-10-10	Loss	(Sweden) Adel Ekvall	West Coast battle 7	Sweden	Decision	5	3:00
2015-04-11	Win	(France) Gaetan Dambo	Extreme Fight For Heroes 3	Draguinan, France	Decision	5	3:00
2013-04-12	Win	(Thailand) Chanaaik Saktawin		Thailand	TKO	3	
2011-07-18	Loss	(Thailand) Noppakrit Namplatrahoimook	Kiatyongyut, Rajadamnern Stadium	Bangkok, Thailand	Decision	5	3:00
For the Rajadamnern Stadium Lightweight (135 lbs) title.
2011-05-19	Draw	(Thailand) Kriangkrai Tor.Silachai	Kiatyongyut, Rajadamnern Stadium	Bangkok, Thailand	Decision	5	3:00
2011-04-09	Loss	(Thailand) Moses Tor.Sangtiennoi	Omnoi Stadium	Samut Sakhon, Thailand	Decision	5	3:00
2010-04-24	Loss	(Thailand) Tukkatatong Phetpayatai	Omnoi Stadium	Samut Sakhon, Thailand	Decision	5	3:00
2010-02-27	Loss	(Thailand) Saenchainoi Pumpanmuang	Omnoi Stadium - Isuzu Cup Semi Final	Samut Sakhon, Thailand	Decision	5	3:00
2010-01-02	Win	(Thailand) Sirimongkol Sakulratana	Omnoi Stadium - Isuzu Cup	Samut Sakhon, Thailand	Decision	5	3:00
2009-11-21	Win	(Thailand) Chok EminentAir	Omnoi Stadium - Isuzu Cup	Samut Sakhon, Thailand	Decision	5	3:00
2009-10-24	Win	(Thailand) Petchmankong Phetfergus	Omnoi Stadium - Isuzu Cup	Samut Sakhon, Thailand	Decision	5	3:00
2009-09-23	Loss	(Thailand) Daoprakai Kwanmuang	Kiatyongyut, Rajadamnern Stadium	Bangkok, Thailand	Decision	5	3:00
2009-08-04	Win	(Thailand) Puja Sor.Suwanee	Eminent Air, Lumpinee Stadium	Bangkok, Thailand	Decision	5	3:00
2009-06-15	Loss	(Thailand) Daoprakai Kwanmuang	Petchaopraya, Rajadamnern Stadium	Bangkok, Thailand	Decision	5	3:00
2009-05-21	Win	(Thailand) Chok EminentAir	Kiatyongyut, Rajadamnern Stadium	Bangkok, Thailand	KO	3	
2009-03-30	Loss	(Thailand) Chok EminentAir	Kiatyongyut, Rajadamnern Stadium	Bangkok, Thailand	Decision	5	3:00
2009-02-20	Win	(Thailand) Phetasawin Seatranferry	Eminent Air, Lumpinee Stadium	Bangkok, Thailand	Decision	5	3:00
2008-12-28	Loss	(Thailand) Sagetdao Petpayathai	Channel 7 Stadium	Bangkok, Thailand	KO (punch)	3	
2008-11-20	Win	(Thailand) Phetasawin Seatranferry	Kiatyongyut, Rajadamnern Stadium	Bangkok, Thailand	Decision	5	3:00
2008-10-16	Loss	(Thailand) Phetasawin Seatranferry	Rajadamnern Stadium	Bangkok, Thailand	Decision	5	3:00
2008-07-31	Loss	(Thailand) Sagetdao Petpayathai	Daorung Chujaroen, Rajadamnern Stadium	Bangkok, Thailand	Decision	5	3:00
2008-07-01	Draw	(Thailand) Sagetdao Petpayathai	Sangmorakot, Lumpinee Stadium	Bangkok, Thailand	Decision	5	3:00
2008-05-22	Loss	(Thailand) Jaroenchai Kesagym	Kiatyongyut, Rajadamnern Stadium	Bangkok, Thailand	Decision	5	3:00
2008-03-06	Win	(Thailand) Orono Muangseema	Kiatyongyut, Rajadamnern Stadium	Bangkok, Thailand	KO	5	
2008-01-30	Loss	(Thailand) Saenchainoi Nongkeesuwit	Kiatyongyut, Rajadamnern Stadium	Bangkok, Thailand	Decision	5	3:00
2007-08-30	Win	(Thailand) Bovy Sor Udomson	Rajadamnern Stadium	Bangkok, Thailand	Decision	5	3:00
2007-07-19	Win	(Thailand) Orono Tawan	Kitayongyut, Rajadamnern Stadium	Bangkok, Thailand	Decision	5	3:00
2007-06-25	Win	(Thailand) Orono Muangseema	Onesongchai, Rajadamnern Stadium	Bangkok, Thailand	Decision	5	3:00
2007-02-14	Loss	(Thailand) Lerdsila Chumpairtour	Sor.Sommai, Rajadamnern Stadium	Bangkok, Thailand	Decision	5	3:00
2007-01-18	Loss	(Thailand) Jomthong Chuwattana	Kiatyongyut, Rajadamnern Stadium	Bangkok, Thailand	Decision	5	3:00
2006-12-28	Win	(Thailand) Puja Sor.Suwanee	Rajadamnern Stadium	Bangkok, Thailand	Decision	5	3:00
2006-10-19	Loss	(Thailand) Puja Sor.Suwanee	OneSongchai, Rajadamnern Stadium	Bangkok, Thailand	Decision	5	3:00
2006-08-31	Win	(Thailand) Saenchainoi Nongkeesuwit	Onesongchai, Rajadamnern Stadium	Bangkok, Thailand	Decision	5	3:00
2006-07-18	Win	(Thailand) Sarawut Lukbanyai	Phetsupaphan, Lumpinee Stadium	Bangkok, Thailand	Decision	5	3:00
2006-05-04	Loss	(Thailand) Kem Sitsongpeenong	Kiatyongyut, Rajadamnern Stadium	Bangkok, Thailand	Decision	5	3:00
2006-04-06	Win	(Thailand) Anuwat Kaewsamrit	Onesongchai, Rajadamnern Stadium	Bangkok, Thailand	TKO (Knees)	4	
2006-03-06	Draw	(Thailand) Sarawut Lukbanyai	Onesongchai, Rajadamnern Stadium	Bangkok, Thailand	Decision	5	3:00
2005-12-22	Loss	(Thailand) Sarawut Lukbanyai	Rajadamnern Stadium Anniversary	Bangkok, Thailand	Decision	5	3:00
2005-11-16	Loss	(Thailand) Puja Sor.Suwanee	OneSongchai, Rajadamnern Stadium	Bangkok, Thailand	Decision	5	3:00
2005-09-22	Win	(Thailand) Isorasak Jor.Rajadakorn	Onesongchai, Rajadamnern Stadium	Bangkok, Thailand	Decision	5	3:00
2005-08-12	Win	(Thailand) Puja Sor.Suwanee	Queens Birthday Superfights, Sanam Luang	Bangkok, Thailand	Decision	5	3:00
2005-07-20	Win	(Thailand) Anuwat Kaewsamrit	Daorungchujarean, Rajadamnern Stadium	Bangkok, Thailand	Decision	5	3:00
2005-06-22	Win	(Thailand) Isorasak Jor.Rajadakorn	Kiatsingnoi, Rajadamnern Stadium	Bangkok, Thailand	Decision	5	3:00
2005-03-17	Loss	(Thailand) Puja Sor.Suwanee	Onesongchai, Rajadamnern Stadium	Bangkok, Thailand	Decision	5	3:00
2005-02-12	Loss	(Thailand) Puja Sor.Suwanee	OneSongchai Tsunami Show, Rajamangala Stadium	Bangkok, Thailand	Decision	5	3:00
2004-12-29	Win	(Thailand) Kem Sitsongpeenong	Onesongchai, Rajadamnern Stadium	Bangkok, Thailand	Decision	5	3:00
2004-10-25	Win	(Thailand) Attachai Nor.Siripeung	Omnoi Stadium	Samut Sakhon, Thailand	Decision	5	3:00
2004-09-17	Loss	(Thailand) Yodbuangam Lukbanyai	Lumpinee Stadium	Bangkok, Thailand	Decision	5	3:00
2004-08-16	Draw	(Thailand) Puja Sor.Suwanee	Onesongchai, Rajadamnern Stadium	Bangkok, Thailand	Decision	5	3:00
2004-05-05	Loss	(Thailand) Sagatpetch Sor.Sakulpan	Rajadamnern Stadium	Bangkok, Thailand	Decision	5	3:00
2004-03-04	Loss	(Thailand) Chalermpol Kiatsunanta	Onesongchai, Rajadamnern Stadium	Bangkok, Thailand	Decision	5	3:00
2004-01-30	Loss	(Thailand) Chalermpol Kiatsunanta	Saengmorakot, Lumpinee Stadium	Bangkok, Thailand	Decision	5	3:00
2003-11-26	Win	(Thailand) Sagatpetch Sor.Sakulpan	Rajadamnern Stadium	Bangkok, Thailand	Decision	5	3:00
2003-10-10	Loss	(Thailand) Singdam Kiatmuu9	Lumpinee Stadium	Bangkok, Thailand	Decision	5	3:00
2003-09-18	Win	(Thailand) Isorasak Jor.Rajadakorn	Onesongchai, Rajadamnern Stadium	Bangkok, Thailand	Decision	5	3:00
2003-08-03	Loss	(Thailand) Isorasak Jor.Rajadakorn	Onesongchai + Kiatyongyut, Rajadamnern Stadium	Bangkok, Thailand	Decision	5	3:00
2003-06-13	Loss	(Thailand) Orono Wor Petchpun	Petchpiya, Rajadamnern Stadium	Bangkok, Thailand	Decision	5	3:00
2003-04-26	Loss	(Thailand) Kongpipop Petchyindee	OneSongchai	Chachoengsao Province, Thailand	Decision	5	3:00
2003-03-03	Loss	(Thailand) Saenchai Sor.Kingstar	OneSongchai, Rajadamnern Stadium	Bangkok, Thailand	Decision	5	3:00
2002-11-28	Win	(Thailand) Sagatpetch Sor.Sakulpan	Rajadamnern Stadium	Bangkok, Thailand	Decision	5	3:00
2002-10-09	Win	(Thailand) Mankong Kiatsamuan	Onesongchai, Rajadamnern Stadium	Bangkok, Thailand	Decision	5	3:00
2002-09-09	Loss	(Thailand) Mankong Kiatsamuan	Onesongchai, Rajadamnern Stadium	Bangkok, Thailand	Decision	5	3:00
2002-08-07	Win	(Thailand) Phet-Ek Sitjaopho	Onesongchai, Rajadamnern Stadium	Bangkok, Thailand	Decision	5	3:00
2002-05-23	Loss	(Thailand) Samkor Chor.Rathchatasupak	Rajadamnern Stadium	Bangkok, Thailand	TKO	5	
2002-	Draw	(Thailand) Phet-Ek Sitjaopho	Onesongchai, Rajadamnern Stadium	Bangkok, Thailand	Decision	5	3:00
2001-12-19	Loss	(Thailand) Saenchai Sor.Khamsing	Rajadamnern Stadium Anniversary	Bangkok, Thailand	Decision	5	3:00
2001-11-21	Win	(Thailand) Saenchai Sor.Khamsing	Onesongchai, Rajadamnern Stadium	Bangkok, Thailand	Decision	5	3:00
2001-05-03	Win	(Thailand) Watcharachai Kaewsamrit	Rajadamnern Stadium	Bangkok, Thailand	Decision	5	3:00
2001-02-14	Win	(Thailand) Isorasak Jor.Rajadakorn	Rajadamnern Stadium	Bangkok, Thailand	Decision	5	3:00
Wins the WMC World Featherweight (126 lbs) title.
2000-12-19	Win	(Thailand) Phetto Sitjaopho	Lumpinee Stadium	Bangkok, Thailand	Decision	5	3:00
2000-11-21	Loss	(Thailand) Chalee Sor.Chaithamil	Por.Pramuk, Lumpinee Stadium	Bangkok, Thailand	Decision	5	3:00
2000-10-31	Loss	(Thailand) Ngathao Attharungroj	OneSongchai, Lumpinee Stadium	Bangkok, Thailand	Decision	5	3:00
2000-10-06	Loss	(Thailand) Ngathao Attharungroj	OneSongchai, Lumpinee Stadium	Bangkok, Thailand	Decision	5	3:00
2000-08-04		(Thailand) Pornpitak PhetUdomchai	OneSongchai, Lumpinee Stadium	Bangkok, Thailand			
2000-07-18		(Thailand) Kotchasarn Singklongksi	OneSongchai, Lumpinee Stadium	Bangkok, Thailand			
2000-04-25	Win	(Thailand) Denthoranee NakornthongParkview	OneSongchai, Lumpinee Stadium	Bangkok, Thailand	Decision	5	3:00
Wins the vacant Lumpinee Stadium Bantamweight (118 lbs) title.
2000-03-03		(Thailand) Khunpinit Kiattawan	OneSongchai, Lumpinee Stadium	Bangkok, Thailand			
2000-02-11	Loss	(Thailand) Saenchai Sor.Khamsing	OneSongchai, Lumpinee Stadium	Bangkok, Thailand	Decision	5	3:00
2000-01-22	Win	(Thailand) Wanphichai Sor Khamsing	Onesongchai, Lumpinee Stadium	Bangkok, Thailand	Decision	5	3:00
1999-11-05	Win	(Thailand) Thongchai Tor.Silachai	Lumpinee Stadium	Bangkok, Thailand	Decision	5	3:00
1999-07-25	Win	(Thailand) Saenkom Kiatpanu	Samrong Stadium	Thailand	Decision	5	3:00
1999-06-20	Win	(Thailand) Rattanachai Wor.Wolapon		Chachoengsao, Thailand	Decision	5	3:00
1998-09-28		(Thailand) Yodradap Dawpaedriew	Lumpinee Stadium	Bangkok, Thailand			
1998-03-27	Win	(Thailand) Sanchai Naratreekul	Rajadamnern Stadium	Bangkok, Thailand	Decision	5	3:00
1998-01-16	Loss	(Thailand) Pornsawan Porpramook	Rajadamnern Stadium	Bangkok, Thailand	Decision	5	3:00
1997-	Win	(Thailand) Yodsaenchai Sityodtong	Lumpinee Stadium	Bangkok, Thailand	Decision	5	3:00
Wins the Lumpinee Stadium Mini Flyweight (105 lbs) title.
1996-11-12	Loss	(Thailand) Phetto Sitjaopho	Onesongchai, Lumpinee Stadium	Bangkok, Thailand	Decision	5	3:00
Legend: Win Loss Draw/No contest Notes

== See also ==
- List of male kickboxers
