= Watcharachai Kaewsamrit =

Thai Muay Thai kickboxer

Watcharachai
- Born: Pornsane Nulak; September 15, 1980 (age 46); Nakhon Si Thammarat province, Thailand
- Height: 1.68 m (5 ft 6 in)
- Weight: 57 kg (126 lb; 9 st 0 lb)
- Style: Muay Thai
- Stance: Southpaw
- Fighting out of: Bangkok, Thailand
- Team: Kaewsamrit
- Trainer: Todtoon Kiatkumchai

Other information
- Occupation: Muay Thai trainer

Watcharachai Kaewsamrit (Thai:วชรชย แกวสมฤทธ) is a Thai Muay Thai fighter. He was the Sports Authority of Thailand Fighter of the Year in 2000.

== Biography ==
Watcharachai started Muay Thai at the age of 12 under the name Pornchainoi Klomlaichang. He came to Bangkok in 1993 and made his Rajadamnern Stadium debut the next year.

Watcharachai retired in 2007 and went back to work on a farm for a time. In 2011 he accepted a job as a trainer for Tiger Muay Thai in Phuket. In 2012 Watcharachai opened his own camp where he trained high level fighter such as Kaimukkao Por.Thairongruangkamai and Palangpon Watcharachaigym. He later coached in other camps in Thailand and overseas, since 2019 he lives and teaches in Australia.

== Titles and accomplishments ==
- World Muay Thai Council
  - 1999 WMC World 118 lbs Champion
- Rajadamnern Stadium
  - 2001 Rajadamnern Stadium 126 lbs Champion
  - 2000 Rajadamnern Stadium Fighter of the Year
- Professional Boxing Association of Thailand (PAT)
  - 2000 Thailand 122 lbs Champion

Awards

- 2000 Sports Authority of Thailand Fighter of the Year

== Muay Thai record ==
Muay Thai record
138 Wins (32 (T)KO's), 39 Losses, 3 Draws
Date	Result	Opponent	Event	Location	Method	Round	Time
2007-04-05	Win	(Thailand) Tuktathong Phetpayathai	Daorungchujarean, Rajadamnern Stadium	Bangkok, Thailand	KO (Elbow)	3	
2007-02-15	Win	(Thailand) Kompayak Beamdesign	Rajadamnern Stadium	Bangkok, Thailand	Referee Stoppage	5	
2006-09-04	Loss	(Thailand) Phet-Ek Sitjaopho	Rajadamnern Stadium	Bangkok, Thailand	Decision	5	3:00
2006-07-06	Loss	(Thailand) Phet-Ek Sitjaopho	Rajadamnern Stadium	Bangkok, Thailand	Decision	5	3:00
2006-05-24	Win	(Thailand) Saenchai Jirakriengkrai	Rajadamnern Stadium	Bangkok, Thailand	Decision	5	3:00
2006-03-01	Loss	(Thailand) Srisuwan Sitkruwinai	Rajadamnern Stadium	Bangkok, Thailand	Decision	5	3:00
2006-01-10	Loss	(Thailand) Dejsak Sor Thamphet	Lumpinee Stadium	Bangkok, Thailand	Decision	5	3:00
2005-11-02	Win	(Thailand) Samingprai Kiatphonthip	Rajadamnern Stadium	Bangkok, Thailand	KO	5	
2005-10-10	Win	(Thailand) Saengsamrit Jittigym	Rajadamnern Stadium	Bangkok, Thailand	KO	2	
2005-09-05	Loss	(Thailand) Singtongnoi Sitsaengarun	Rajadamnern Stadium	Bangkok, Thailand	Decision	5	3:00
2005-07-27	Win	(Thailand) Saenchai Jirakriengkrai	Rajadamnern Stadium	Bangkok, Thailand	Decision	5	3:00
2005-05-30	Loss	(Thailand) Jomthong Chuwattana	Daorungchujarean, Rajadamnern Stadium	Bangkok, Thailand	Decision	5	3:00
2005-04-07	Loss	(Thailand) Yodwanlop Por.Nattachai	Rajadamnern Stadium	Bangkok, Thailand	Decision	5	3:00
2005-03-03	Loss	(Thailand) Dejsak Sor Thamphet	Rajadamnern Stadium	Bangkok, Thailand	KO (sweep to head kick)	4	
2005-01-26	Loss	(Thailand) Saenchernglek Jirakriengkrai	Rajadamnern Stadium	Bangkok, Thailand	Decision	5	3:00
2004-12-23	Loss	(Thailand) Lerdsila Chumpairtour	Rajadamnern Stadium	Bangkok, Thailand	Decision	5	3:00
2004-09-30	Loss	(Thailand) Mitthai Sor.Sakulphan	Rajadamnern Stadium	Bangkok, Thailand	Decision	5	3:00
2004-09-01	Win	(Thailand) Wanchai Meenayothin	Rajadamnern Stadium	Bangkok, Thailand	KO	3	
2004-06-17	Loss	(Thailand) Extra Pinsinchai	Rajadamnern Stadium	Bangkok, Thailand	Decision	5	3:00
2004-05-02	Win	(Japan) Yohei Sakurai	NJKF X-DUEL IV	Tokyo, Japan	TKO (Corner stoppage)	3	2:35
2004-04-01	Win	(Thailand) Lerdsila Chumpairtour	Rajadamnern Stadium	Bangkok, Thailand	TKO	3	
2004-03-18	Win	(Thailand) Nuaphet Sakhomsil	Rajadamnern Stadium	Bangkok, Thailand	Decision	5	3:00
2004-01-27	Loss	(Thailand) Yodsanklai Fairtex	Petchpiya, Lumpinee Stadium	Bangkok, Thailand	TKO	1	
2003-12-18	Win	(Thailand) Saksi Sit Or	Rajadamnern Stadium	Bangkok, Thailand	KO	5	
2003-11-24	Loss	(Thailand) Lerdsila Chumpairtour	Rajadamnern Stadium	Bangkok, Thailand	Decision	5	3:00
2003-10-19	Win	(Thailand) Komphet	Channel 7 Stadium	Bangkok, Thailand	KO	1	
2003-08-14	Loss	(Thailand) Fahsuchon Sit-O	Rajadamnern Stadium	Bangkok, Thailand	Decision	5	3:00
2003-06-	Loss	(Thailand) Lerdsila Chumpairtour	Rajadamnern Stadium	Bangkok, Thailand	Decision	5	3:00
2003-03-31		(Thailand) Daoudon Sor.Suchart	Rajadamnern Stadium	Bangkok, Thailand	Decision	5	3:00
2003-02-05	Loss	(Thailand) Chalermpol Kiatsunanta	Rajadamnern Stadium	Bangkok, Thailand	Decision	5	3:00
2003-01-10	Win	(Thailand) Sanghiran Lukbanyai	Rajadamnern Stadium	Bangkok, Thailand	Decision	5	3:00
2002-	Win	(Thailand) Daoudon Sor.Suchart	Rajadamnern Stadium	Bangkok, Thailand	TKO	4	
2002-12-03	Loss	(Thailand) Kongpipop Petchyindee	Lumpinee Stadium	Bangkok, Thailand	Decision	5	3:00
2002-	Win	(Thailand) Sanghiran Lukbanyai	Rajadamnern Stadium	Bangkok, Thailand	Decision	5	3:00
2002-10-30	Win	(Thailand) Yodbuangam Lukbanyai	Rajadamnern Stadium	Bangkok, Thailand	Decision	5	3:00
2002-10-04	Win	(Thailand) Samranchai 96Peenang	Lumpinee Stadium	Bangkok, Thailand	Decision	5	3:00
2002-	Draw	(Thailand) Muangfahlek Kiatwichian	Rajadamnern Stadium	Bangkok, Thailand	Decision	5	3:00
2002-	Win	(Thailand) Tananchai Nakonthongpakview	Channel 7 Stadium	Bangkok, Thailand	Decision	5	3:00
2002-06-23	Loss	(Thailand) Tananchai Nakonthongpakview	Channel 7 Stadium	Bangkok, Thailand	Decision	5	3:00
2002-04-05	Loss	(Thailand) Sanghiran Lukbanyai	Lumpinee Stadium	Bangkok, Thailand	KO (Punches)	3	
For the Lumpinee Stadium 122 lbs title.
2002-03-11	Win	(Thailand) Sanghiran Lukbanyai	Rajadamnern Stadium	Bangkok, Thailand	Decision	5	3:00
2001-12-30	Loss	(Thailand) Sanghiran Lukbanyai	Channel 7 Stadium	Bangkok, Thailand	Decision	5	3:00
2001-10-17	Loss	(Thailand) Nontachai Kiatwanlop	Rajadamnern Stadium	Bangkok, Thailand	Decision	5	3:00
2001-09-05	Loss	(Thailand) Mitthai Sor.Sakulphan	Rajadamnern Stadium	Bangkok, Thailand	Decision	5	3:00
2001-07-18	Loss	(Thailand) Noppakao Sauwanchat	Rajadamnern Stadium	Bangkok, Thailand	Decision	5	3:00
Loses the Rajadamnern Stadium 126 lbs title.
2001-06-23	Win	(Thailand) Sanghiran Lukbanyai	Lumpinee Stadium	Bangkok, Thailand	Decision	5	3:00
2001-05-25	Win	(Thailand) Sanghiran Lukbanyai	Lumpinee Stadium	Bangkok, Thailand	Decision	5	3:00
2001-05-03	Loss	(Thailand) Nongbee Kiatyongyut	Rajadamnern Stadium	Bangkok, Thailand	Decision	5	3:00
2001-	Loss	(Thailand) Pornpitak PhetUdomchai	Rajadamnern Stadium	Bangkok, Thailand	Decision	5	3:00
2001-02-27	Loss	(Thailand) Chanrit Sit-O	Lumpinee Stadium	Bangkok, Thailand	Decision	5	3:00
2001-02-11	Win	(Thailand) Chinrat Chor.Watcharin	Channel 7 Stadium	Bangkok, Thailand	KO	5	
2001-01-17	Win	(Thailand) Noppakao Sauwanchat	Rajadamnern Stadium	Bangkok, Thailand	Decision	5	3:00
Wins the Rajadamnern Stadium 126 lbs title.
2000-12-08	Win	(Thailand) Yodbuangam Lukbanyai	Lumpinee Stadium	Bangkok, Thailand	Decision	5	3:00
Wins the vacant Thailand 122 lbs title and the 2.6 million baht side-bet.
2000-10-03	Win	(Thailand) Dokmaifai Tor.Sitthichai	Lumpinee Stadium	Bangkok, Thailand	KO	4	
2000-09-12	Win	(Thailand) Orono MajesticGym	Lumpinee Stadium	Bangkok, Thailand	Decision	5	3:00
2000-08-13	Win	(Thailand) Rungrawee Sor.Ploenchit	Rajadamnern Stadium	Bangkok, Thailand	Decision	5	3:00
2000-06-30	Win	(Thailand) Sanghiran Lukbanyai	Lumpinee Stadium	Bangkok, Thailand	Decision	5	3:00
2000-05-30	Win	(Thailand) Saksit Sit-Or	Lumpinee Stadium	Bangkok, Thailand	Decision	5	3:00
2000-05-02	Win	(Thailand) Tananchai Nakonthongpakview	Lumpinee Stadium	Bangkok, Thailand	KO	4	
2000-04-14	Win	(New Zealand) Jack		New Zealand	Decision	5	3:00
2000-03-31	Win	(Thailand) Phet-Ek Sor.Suwanpakdee	Lumpinee Stadium	Bangkok, Thailand	Decision	5	3:00
2000-02-02	Win	(Thailand) Muangfahlek Kiatwichian	Rajadamnern Stadium	Bangkok, Thailand	Decision	5	3:00
1999-12-29	Win	(Thailand) Poolsawatlek Wor.Singsanae		Bangkok, Thailand	Decision	5	3:00
1999-10-29	Loss	(Thailand) Tananchai Nakonthongpakview	Lumpinee Stadium	Bangkok, Thailand	Decision	5	3:00
1999-	Draw	(Thailand) Charlie Sochaitakmin	Rajadamnern Stadium	Bangkok, Thailand	Decision	5	3:00
1999-07-23	Win	(Thailand) Duangsompong Por.Pongsawang	Lumpinee Stadium	Bangkok, Thailand	Decision	5	3:00
1999-05-19		(Thailand) Rungrawee Sor.Ploenchit		Bangkok, Thailand			
1998-12-23		(Thailand) Lerdsila Chumpairtour		Bangkok, Thailand			
1998-10-10	Win	(Thailand) Chondan Technodusit	Omnoi Stadium - Isuzu Cup	Bangkok, Thailand	Decision	5	3:00
1998-03-23	Win	(Thailand) Damnoensak Saksurapong	Rajadamnern Stadium	Bangkok, Thailand	Decision	5	3:00
Legend: Win Loss Draw/No contest Notes

== See also ==
- List of male kickboxers
