= Phet-Ek Sitjaopho =

Thai Muay Thai fighter

- Born: Poonnasit Kambung; November 27, 1981 (age 44); Hua Hin, Prachuap Khiri Khan, Thailand
- Other names: Phet Aek Dechusri (เพชรเอก เดชชูศรี)
- Height: 173 cm (5 ft 8 in)
- Division: Flyweight; Super Bantamweight; Featherweight
- Style: Muay Thai (Muay Femur)
- Stance: Orthodox
- Trainer: Suwit Sitjaopho

Other information
- Occupation: Muay Thai trainer
- Notable relatives: Phetto Sitjaopho (twin brother)

Poonnasit Kambung (Thai: พูนสิทธิ์ คำบุญ; born November 27, 1981), known professionally as Phetek Sitjaopho (Thai: เพชรเอก ศิษย์เจ้าพ่อ), is a Thai former professional Muay Thai fighter. He is a former Lumpinee Stadium Flyweight Champion who was famous during the 2000s.

== Biography and career ==
Phet-Ek started training in Muay Thai alongside his twin brother in their native province of Prachuap Khiri Khan, there he won the Hua Hin stadium title as a child. He later won the 35 kg Central Thailand title.

In Bangkok Phet-Ek was elected Lumpinee Stadium fighter of the year in 2000. He also captured the 112 lbs title. In 2002 he won the Thailand 122 lbs title from Sanghiran Lukbanyai.

Phet-Ek defeated many notable fighters of his era such as Wuttidet Lukprabat, Petch Por.Burapha, Nungubon Sitlerchai, Thongchai Tor.Silachai, Ngathao Attarungroj, Bovy Sor Udomson or Watcharachai Kaewsamrit. He beat Anuwat Kaewsamrit in 2007 for the Omnoi Stadium 126 lbs title. He also faced muay thai legend Saenchai twice, he lost to him by decision both times.

Phet-Ek defeated Kaimukkao Por.Thairongruangkamai by decision on October 7, 2010, and was scheduled to face Petch-Ek Kiatyongyut on November 9. He lost the fight by decision and retired from fighting shortly after. He became a muay thai trainer and he currently lives in Sweden where he is married and has two children.

== Titles and accomplishments ==
- Lumpinee Stadium
  - 2000 Lumpinee Stadium Flyweight (112 lbs) Champion
  - 2000 Lumpinee Stadium Fighter of the Year
- Professional Boxing Association of Thailand (PAT)
  - 2002 Thailand Super Bantamweight (122 lbs) Champion
- Siam Omnoi Stadium
  - 2007 Omnoi Stadium Featherweight (126 lbs) Champion
  - 2007 17th Isuzu Cup (125 lbs) Winner

== Muay Thai record ==
Muay Thai record
| Date | Result | Opponent | Event | Location | Method | Round | Time |
|---|---|---|---|---|---|---|---|
| 2010-11-09 | Loss | (Thailand) Petch-Ek Kiatyongyut | Rajadamnern Stadium | Bangkok, Thailand | Decision | 5 | 3:00 |
| 2010-10-07 | Win | (Thailand) Kaimukkao Por.Thairongruangkamai | Rajadamnern Stadium | Bangkok, Thailand | Decision | 5 | 3:00 |
| 2010-08-30 | Win | (Thailand) Kaimukkao Por.Thairongruangkamai | Rajadamnern Stadium | Bangkok, Thailand | Decision | 5 | 3:00 |
| 2010-02-27 | Loss | (Thailand) Rittijak Kaewsamrit | Channel 7 Stadium | Bangkok, Thailand | Decision | 5 | 3:00 |
| 2009-06-27 | Loss | (Thailand) Manasak Sitniwat | Omnoi Stadium | Samut Sakhon, Thailand | Decision | 5 | 3:00 |
| 2009-03-14 | Win | (Thailand) Rittijak Kaewsamrit | Onesongchai | Singburi, Thailand | Decision | 5 | 3:00 |
| 2009-01-29 | Loss | (Thailand) Rungniran Chor.Kowyuha Isuzu | Rajadamnern Stadium | Bangkok, Thailand | Decision | 5 | 3:00 |
| 2008-10-02 | Loss | (Thailand) Anuwat Kaewsamrit | Daorungchujarean, Rajadamnern Stadium | Bangkok, Thailand | KO (Left hook to the body) | 3 | |
| 2008-08-28 | Draw | (Thailand) Pettawee Sor Kittichai | Wanthongchai, Rajadamnern Stadium | Bangkok, Thailand | Decision | 5 | 3:00 |
| 2008-07-21 | Loss | (Thailand) Singtongnoi Por.Telakun | Rajadamnern Stadium | Bangkok, Thailand | Decision | 5 | 3:00 |
| 2008-05-01 | Loss | (Thailand) Phetsanguan Sitniwat | Daorungchujarean, Rajadamnern Stadium | Bangkok, Thailand | Decision | 5 | 3:00 |
| 2008-03-08 | Loss | (Thailand) Singtongnoi Por.Telakun | Onesongchai | Sakon Nakhon Province, Thailand | Decision | 5 | 3:00 |
| 2008-01-21 | Loss | (Thailand) Singtongnoi Por.Telakun | Rajadamnern Stadium | Bangkok, Thailand | Decision | 5 | 3:00 |
| 2007-05-19 | Win | (Thailand) Anuwat Kaewsamrit | Omnoi Stadium | Samut Sakhon, Thailand | Decision | 5 | 3:00 |
Wins the vacant Omnoi Stadium Featherweight (126 lbs) title.
| 2007-03-10 | Win | (Thailand) Longern Pitakruchaidan | Omnoi Stadium - Isuzu Cup, Final | Samut Sakhon, Thailand | Decision | 5 | 3:00 |
Wins the 17th Isuzu Cup title.
| 2007-02-03 | Win | (Thailand) Rattanasak Wor.Walaphon | Omnoi Stadium - Isuzu Cup, Semifinal | Samut Sakhon, Thailand | Decision | 5 | 3:00 |
| 2006-12-02 | Win | (Thailand) Danchai Tor.Silachai | Omnoi Stadium - Isuzu Cup | Samut Sakhon, Thailand | TKO (Doctor stoppage) | 3 | |
| 2006-09-04 | Win | (Thailand) Watcharachai Kaewsamrit | Rajadamnern Stadium | Bangkok, Thailand | Decision | 5 | 3:00 |
| 2006-08-05 | Loss | (Thailand) Pettawee Sor Kittichai | Omnoi Stadium | Samut Sakhon, Thailand | Decision | 5 | 3:00 |
| 2006-07-06 | Win | (Thailand) Watcharachai Kaewsamrit | Rajadamnern Stadium | Bangkok, Thailand | Decision | 5 | 3:00 |
| 2005-01-11 | Win | (Thailand) Sinchainoi Sor.Kittichai | Piranan, Rajadamnern Stadium | Bangkok, Thailand | Decision | 5 | 3:00 |
| 2004-09-25 | Win | (Thailand) Rungrawee Sor.Ploenchit | Onesongchai, Rajadamnern Stadium | Bangkok, Thailand | Decision | 5 | 3:00 |
| 2004-07-30 | Loss | (Thailand) Yodbuangam Lukbanyai | Por.Pramuk, Lumpinee Stadium | Bangkok, Thailand | KO | 3 | |
| 2004-07-08 | Win | (Thailand) Ronnachai Naratreekul | Onesongchai, Rajadamnern Stadium | Bangkok, Thailand | Decision | 5 | 3:00 |
| 2004-05-05 | Win | (Thailand) Fahsuchon Sit-O | Chaoballanglok, Rajadamnern Stadium | Bangkok, Thailand | Decision | 5 | 3:00 |
| 2004-03-04 | Loss | (Thailand) Kem Sitsongpeenong | Onesongchai, Rajadamnern Stadium | Bangkok, Thailand | Decision | 5 | 3:00 |
| 2003-10-28 | Loss | (Thailand) Nueapetch Sakhomsin | Wanboonya, Lumpinee Stadium | Bangkok, Thailand | KO | 2 | |
| 2003-10-02 | Loss | (Thailand) Puja Sor.Suwanee | Onesongchai, Rajadamnern Stadium | Bangkok, Thailand | Decision | 5 | 3:00 |
| 2003-09-07 | Loss | (Thailand) Yodbuangam Lukbanyai | Onesongchai, Rajadamnern Stadium | Bangkok, Thailand | Decision | 5 | 3:00 |
| 2003-06-23 | Draw | (Thailand) Puja Sor.Suwanee | Onesongchai, Rajadamnern Stadium | Bangkok, Thailand | Decision | 5 | 3:00 |
| 2003-04-26 | Loss | (Thailand) Saenchai Sor.Kingstar | Chachoengsao Promotion | Thailand | Decision | 5 | 3:00 |
| 2003-03-01 | Win | (Thailand) Bovy Sor Udomson | Kiatsingnoi, Rajadamnern Stadium | Bangkok, Thailand | TKO (Referee stoppage) | 1 | |
| 2003-01-29 | Win | (Thailand) Saiyannoi Kiatprapat | Onesongchai, Rajadamnern Stadium | Bangkok, Thailand | Decision | 5 | 3:00 |
| 2002-10-09 | Loss | (Thailand) Klairung Sor.Chaicharoen | Onesongchai, Rajadamnern Stadium | Bangkok, Thailand | Decision | 5 | 3:00 |
| 2002-08-07 | Loss | (Thailand) Nongbee Kiatyongyut | Onesongchai, Rajadamnern Stadium | Bangkok, Thailand | Decision | 5 | 3:00 |
| 2002-07-09 | Loss | (Thailand) Saenchai Sor.Kingstar | Petchburapa, Lumpinee Stadium | Bangkok, Thailand | Decision | 5 | 3:00 |
| 2002- | Loss | (Thailand) Kem Sitsongpeenong | Rajadamnern Stadium | Bangkok, Thailand | Decision | 5 | 3:00 |
| 2002-05-22 | Win | (Thailand) Sanghiran Lukbanyai | Lumpinee Stadium | Bangkok, Thailand | Decision | 5 | 3:00 |
Wins the Thailand Super Bantamweight (122 lbs) title.
| 2002- | Draw | (Thailand) Nongbee Kiatyongyut | Onesongchai, Rajadamnern Stadium | Bangkok, Thailand | Decision | 5 | 3:00 |
| 2002- | Win | (Thailand) Duewa KongUdom | | Bangkok, Thailand | Decision | 5 | 3:00 |
| 2002-01-14 | Win | (Thailand) Ngathao Attharungroj | Wan Muay Thai + Onesongchai, Rajadamnern Stadium | Bangkok, Thailand | Decision | 5 | 3:00 |
| 2001-12-19 | Loss | (Thailand) Khunpinit Kiattawan | Onesongchai, Rajadamnern Stadium | Bangkok, Thailand | Decision | 5 | 3:00 |
| 2001-11- | Win | (Thailand) Kongprai Por.Pinyo | | Bangkok, Thailand | Decision | 5 | 3:00 |
| 2001-10- | Loss | (Thailand) Michael Sor.Sakulpan | | Bangkok, Thailand | Decision | 5 | 3:00 |
| 2001-08-29 | Loss | (Thailand) Pornpitak PhetUdomachai | Rajadamnern Stadium | Bangkok, Thailand | Decision | 5 | 3:00 |
| 2001-06-07 | Win | (Thailand) Anuwat Kaewsamrit | Onesongchai, Rajadamnern Stadium | Bangkok, Thailand | Decision | 5 | 3:00 |
| 2001-04-05 | Win | (Thailand) Phaisitong Lukphattara | Rajadamnern Stadium | Bangkok, Thailand | Decision | 5 | 3:00 |
| 2001-03-14 | Win | (Thailand) Wanpichai Sor.Khamsing | Rajadamnern Stadium | Bangkok, Thailand | Decision | 5 | 3:00 |
| 2001-02-21 | Win | (Thailand) Rattanasak Kratingdaeng | Rajadamnern Stadium | Bangkok, Thailand | Decision | 5 | 3:00 |
| 2001-01-25 | Loss | (Thailand) Wanpichai Sor.Khamsing | Rajadamnern Stadium | Bangkok, Thailand | Decision | 5 | 3:00 |
| 2000-12-19 | Loss | (Thailand) Ngathao Attharungroj | Onesongchai, Lumpinee Stadium | Bangkok, Thailand | KO | 2 | |
| 2000-11-24 | Win | (Thailand) Ngathao Attharungroj | Onesongchai, Lumpinee Stadium | Bangkok, Thailand | Decision | 5 | 3:00 |
| 2000-10-31 | Win | (Thailand) Paruhatnoi Sitjamee | Onesongchai, Lumpinee Stadium | Bangkok, Thailand | Decision | 5 | 3:00 |
| 2000-10-06 | Win | (Thailand) Khajonklai Por.Burapha | Lumpinee Stadium | Bangkok, Thailand | KO | 4 | |
| 2000-09-08 | Win | (Thailand) Thongchai Tor.Silachai | Lumpinee Stadium | Bangkok, Thailand | Decision | 5 | 3:00 |
| 2000-08-04 | Win | (Thailand) Nungubon Sitlerchai | Onesongchai, Lumpinee Stadium | Bangkok, Thailand | Decision | 5 | 3:00 |
| 2000-07-18 | Win | (Thailand) Petch Por.Burapha | Lumpinee Stadium | Bangkok, Thailand | Decision | 5 | 3:00 |
Wins the Lumpinee Stadium Flyweight (112 lbs) title.
| 2000-06-27 | Win | (Thailand) Rungrit Sit Chamlong | Lumpinee Stadium | Bangkok, Thailand | Decision | 5 | 3:00 |
| 2000-05-26 | Win | (Thailand) Wuttidet Lukprabat | Rajadamnern Stadium | Bangkok, Thailand | TKO (Elbow) | 4 | |
| 2000-04-15 | Loss | (Thailand) Yodradab Daopaedriew | Lumpinee Stadium | Bangkok, Thailand | Decision | 5 | 3:00 |
| 2000- | Win | (Thailand) Terdtailek Nakhonthongparkview | | Chachoengsao province, Thailand | Decision | 5 | 3:00 |
| 2000- | Win | (Thailand) Chansak Singklongsi | Lumpinee Stadium | Bangkok, Thailand | Decision | 5 | 3:00 |
| 2000- | Win | (Thailand) Yodsaenchai Sor.Sakulpan | Lumpinee Stadium | Bangkok, Thailand | Decision | 5 | 3:00 |
| 1999-05-19 | Win | (Thailand) Winaiphet Krathingdaeng | Lumpinee Stadium | Bangkok, Thailand | Decision | 5 | 3:00 |
| 1999-03-14 | Win | (Thailand) Kaokarat Fairtex | | Bangkok, Thailand | Decision | 5 | 3:00 |
| 1997- | Loss | (Thailand) Sitrak Sor.Maneechai | Onesongchai, Lumpinee Stadium | Bangkok, Thailand | Decision | 5 | 3:00 |
Bangkok debut.
Legend: Win Loss Draw/No contest Notes
