= Kem Sitsongpeenong =

Thai kickboxer (born 1984)

- Born: Surasak Pakkhothakang; December 16, 1984 (age 41); Wapi Pathum, Maha Sarakham, Thailand
- Native name: สุรศักดิ์ ปักโคทะกัง
- Other names: Khem Fairtex (สุรศักดิ์ ปักโคทะกัง); Khem Sor.Ploenchit (สุรศักดิ์ ส.เพลินจิต)
- Nickname: The Fierce Tiger of Wapi Pathum (พยัคฆ์ร้ายวาปีปทุม)
- Height: 173 cm (5 ft 8 in)
- Division: Super Featherweight; Lightweight; Welterweight; Light Middleweight; Middleweight
- Style: Muay Thai (???); Kickboxing
- Stance: Orthodox
- Team: Sitsongpeenong Muaythai; Fairtex Gym (2008-2009); Sor Ploenchit ( -2008)
- Trainer: Monlit Sitpohdaeng
- Years active: c. 1997–2017

Kickboxing record
- Total: 160
- Wins: 130
- By knockout: 23
- Losses: 26
- By knockout: 7
- Draws: 4

Other information
- Website: www.sitsongpeenong.com

Surasak Pakkhothakang (Thai: สุรศักดิ์ ปักโคทะกัง; born December 16, 1984), known professionally as Kem Sitsongpeenong (Thai: เข้ม ศิษย์สองพี่น้อง) is a Thai retired Muay Thai fighter and professional kickboxer.

== Biography and career ==
Kem Sitsongpeenong was born as Surasak Pakkhothakang (สุรศักดิ์ ปักโคทะกัง) in Maha Sarakham Province in Northeastern (Isan) region of Thailand on December 16, 1984. He had his first fight at the age of 13 in 1997.

Following a disappointing showing at the IFMA 2012 World Muaythai Championships where he lost out to Vitaly Gurkov in the finals to take bronze, Kem returned to the professional ranks on September 28, 2012 when he defeated Thepsuthin Pumpanmuang, Prakaysaeng Gaiyang 5 Daow and Sirimongkol Sitanuparp, respectively, to win the Toyota Vigo Marathon 2012.

Kem lost to eventual tournament winner Andy Souwer by majority decision (29-29, 29-28, 30-28) at the quarter-final stage of the Shoot Boxing World Tournament 2012 on November 17, 2012 in Tokyo, Japan.

He was knocked out with a third round elbow by former stablemate Yodsaenklai Fairtex at Muay Thai Combat Mania: Pattaya in Pattaya, Thailand on December 30, 2012.

Kem fought to a draw with Jordan Watson in a three round bout at Yokkao Extreme 2013 on January 26, 2013 in Milan, Italy.

He floored Mickael Piscitello with elbows numerous times en route to a unanimous decision win at Best of Siam 3 in Paris, France, on February 14, 2013.

On May 6, 2013, Kem defeated Dylan Salvador by unanimous decision at MAX Muay Thai 1 in Surin, Thailand.

It was reported that he would fight Mehdi Zatout at the WBC World Muay Thai Millennium Championship in Saint-Pierre, Réunion on September 7, 2013. However, he denied ever being on the card.

He was expected to fight at MAX Muay Thai 2 in Jakarta, Indonesia on June 29, 2013 but withdrew for undisclosed reasons.

He KO'd Maiki Karathanasis with a third round elbow at MAX Muay Thai 3 in Zhengzhou, China on August 10, 2013.

He beat Vahid Roshani by decision at MAX Muay Thai 5: The Final Chapter in Khon Kaen, Thailand on December 10, 2013.

Kem lost the WBC Muaythai World Super Welterweight (-69.8 kg/154 lb) Championship when he was defeated by Vitaly Gurkov via decision at Ring Wars in Milan, Italy, on January 25, 2014.

Kem competed in the welterweight (-70 kg/154 lb) tournament at Xtreme Muay Thai 2014 in Kowloon, Hong Kong on March 29, 2014, and was initially set to face Seyedisa Alamdarnezam in the semi-finals. His opponent was later changed to Victor Nagbe, who knocked out Kem with a second round high kick.

He defeated Singmanee Kaewsamrit via TKO due to a cut in round two at Muay Thai in Macau on June 6, 2014.

== Titles and achievements ==
=== Professional ===
- Toyota Marathon
  - 2012 Toyota Vigo Marathon Tournament Champion (154 lbs)
- World Boxing Council Muaythai
  - 2012 WBC World Muaythai Super Welterweight (154 lbs) Champion
- THAI FIGHT
    - 2011 Thai Fight Tournament -67 kg Champion
- Isuzu Cup
  - 2011 21st Isuzu Cup Winner
- La Nuit Des Champions
  - 2010 NDC Muaythai -70 kg Champion
  - 2009 NDC Muaythai -67 kg Champion
- Explosion Fight Night
  - 2010 Explosion Fight Night Volume 01 Tournament (71 kg) Winner
- Muay Thai Association
  - 2009 MTA Muaythai World 69 kg champion
- World Muaythai Council
  - 2009 WMC Super Welterweight (154 lbs) World champion
  - 2008 WMC/S-1 King's Cup tournament champion
- Rajadamnern Stadium
  - 2006 Rajadamnern Stadium Super Featherweight (130 lbs) champion
- Professional Boxing Association of Thailand (PAT)
  - 2002 Thailand Super Bantamweight (122 lbs) champion
  - 2009 Thailand Super Welterweight (154 lbs) champion

=== Amateur ===
- International Federation of Muaythai Associations
  - 2012 I.F.M.A. World Championships -71 kg (bronze)

== Fight record ==
Fight record
130 Wins, 26 Losses, 4 Draws
Date	Result	Opponent	Event	Location	Method	Round	Time
2017-01-13	Loss	(China) Qiu Jianliang	Glory of Heroes 6	Jiyuan, China	KO (Spinning Back Kick to the Body)	1	2:19
2016-10-01	Win	(China) Ji Xiang	Glory of Heroes 5	Zhengzhou, China	Decision (Unanimous)	3	3:00
2016-07-05	Win	(China) Hu yafei	Glory of Heroes 3	Jiyuan, China	Decision	3	3:00
2016-06-05	Win	(Uganda) Umar Semata	Emei Legend 9	China	Decision	3	3:00
2016-10-01	Win	(China) Tie Yinghua	Glory of Heroes 2	Shenzhen, China	Decision	3	3:00
2015-12-28	Loss	(Belarus) Dmitry Varats	Topking World Series 8, Semi Finals	Pattaya, Thailand	TKO	1	
2015-10-17	Win	(Ukraine) Sergey Kulyaba	Top King World Series 7 Final 8	China	Decision	3	3:00
2015-06-26	Win	(Italy) Martin Meoni	Top King World Series Final 16	China	TKO(referee stoppage)	2	3:00
2015-06-26	Win	(China) Wang Pengfei	silu hero	China	KO(right knee to the body)	2	
2015-06-12	Win	(France) Florian Breau	Final Legend	China	Decision	3	
2014-10-28	Win	Warren Starvuni	Petyindee Promotions	Bangkok, Thailand	TKO	1	
2014-08-24	Loss	(Slovakia) Vladimir Konsky	Kunlun Fight 8	China	Decision	3	3:00
2014-06-06	Win	(Thailand) Singmanee Kaewsamrit	Muay Thai in Macau	Macau, China	TKO (cut)	2	
2014-05-17	Win	(China) Gu Hui	Hero Legends	Shenzhen, China	Decision (unanimous)	3	3:00
2014-03-29	Loss	(Australia) Victor Nagbe	Xtreme Muay Thai 2014, Semi Finals	Kowloon, Hong Kong	KO (left high kick)	2	
2014-02-16	Win	(Australia) Toby Smith	MAX Muay Thai 6	Zhengzhou, China	TKO (Elbow Cut)	2	
2014-01-25	Loss	(Belarus) Vitaly Gurkov	Ring Wars	Milan, Italy	Decision	5	3:00
Loses the WBC Muaythai World Super Welterweight (-69.8 kg/154 lb) Championship.
2013-12-10	Win	(Iran) Vahid Roshani	MAX Muay Thai 5: The Final Chapter	Khon Kaen, Thailand	Decision	3	3:00
2013-09-07	Win	(France) Dylan Salvador	Millenium Team Fight	La Réunion	Decision	5	3:00
2013-08-10	Win	(Netherlands) Maiki Karathanasis	MAX Muay Thai 3	Zhengzhou, China	KO (elbow)	3	
2013-05-06	Win	(France) Dylan Salvador	MAX Muay Thai 1	Surin, Thailand	Decision (unanimous)	3	3:00
2013-02-14	Win	(France) Mickael Piscitello	Best of Siam 3	Paris, France	Decision (unanimous)	5	3:00
2013-01-26	Draw	(England) Jordan Watson	Yokkao Extreme 2013	Milan, Italy	Decision draw	3	3:00
2012-12-30	Loss	(Thailand) Yodsaenklai Fairtex	Muay Thai Combat Mania: Pattaya	Pattaya, Thailand	KO (elbow)	3	
2012-11-17	Loss	(Netherlands) Andy Souwer	Shoot Boxing World Tournament 2012, Quarter Finals	Tokyo, Japan	Decision (majority)	3	3:00
2012-09-28	Win	(Thailand) Sirimongkol Sitanuparp	Toyota Vigo Marathon 2012, Final	Chiang Mai, Thailand	Decision	3	3:00
Wins Toyota Vigo Marathon 2012 Tournament title (154 lbs).							
2012-09-28	Win	(Thailand) Prakaysaeng Gaiyang 5 Daow	Toyota Vigo Marathon 2012, Semi Final	Chiang Mai, Thailand	Decision	3	3:00
2012-09-28	Win	(Thailand) Thepsuthin Pumpanmuang	Toyota Vigo Marathon 2012, Quarter Final	Chiang Mai, Thailand	Decision	3	3:00
2012-06-09	Win	(Equatorial Guinea) Alejandro Asumu Osa	WBC Battle of the belts	Bangkok, Thailand	KO (Right Elbow)	2	
Wins WBC Super Welterweight title (154 lbs/69.853 kg).
2012-05-26	Loss	(Georgia (country)) David Kyria	Glory 1: Stockholm - 70 kg Slam Tournament, First Round	Stockholm, Sweden	Decision (Unanimous)	3	3:00
2012-04-17	Win	(Switzerland) Mickael Cornubet	Thai Fight 2012	Pattaya, Thailand	TKO (Doctor Stoppage)	1	2:04
2011-12-18	Win	(France) Fabio Pinca	Thai Fight 2011 67 kg Tournament, Final	Bangkok, Thailand	Decision	3	3:00
Wins Thai Fight 2011 67kg Tournament title.
2011-11-27	Win	(South Korea) Dongsu Kim	Thai Fight 2011 67 kg Tournament, Semi Final	Bangkok, Thailand	Decision	5	3:00
2011-09-25	Win	(Italy) Alessio Angelo	Thai Fight 2011 67 kg Tournament, Quarter Final	Bangkok, Thailand	TKO (Elbow/Cut)	1	
2011-06-11	Win	(Thailand) Nopparat Keatkhamtorn	Isuzu Tournament Final, Omnoi Stadium	Bangkok, Thailand	KO (Elbow/Cut)	3	
Wins 21st Isuzu Cup Tournament title.
2011-04-16	Win	(Thailand) Prakaisaeng Sit O	Isuzu Tournament Semi Final, Omnoi Stadium	Bangkok, Thailand	DQ (Referee stop)	4	1:30
2011-02-12	Win	(Thailand) Kongjak Sor Tuantong	Isuzu Tournament 3rd Round, Omnoi Stadium	Bangkok, Thailand	KO (Right elbow)	2	
2011-01-15	Loss	(Thailand) Sudsakorn Sor Klinmee	Isuzu Tournament 2nd Round, Omnoi Stadium	Bangkok, Thailand	Decision	5	3:00
2010-12-25	Win	(Thailand) Nopparat Keatkhamtorn	Isuzu Tournament 1st Round, Omnoi Stadium	Bangkok, Thailand	TKO (Ref. stop/right cross)	3	0:39
2010-11-26	Win	(France) Abdallah Mabel	La Nuit des Champions 2010	Marseilles, France	Decision	5	3:00
Wins "Nuit des Champions" Muaythai belt (-70 kg).
2010-11-02	Win	(Thailand) Prakaisaeng Sit O	Lumpini & Ratchadamnern Charity Event	Bangkok, Thailand	Decision	5	3:00
2010-09-12	Loss	(Morocco) Rachid Belaini	Fightingstars presents: It's Showtime 2010	Amsterdam, Netherlands	KO	2	
2010-08-10	Loss	(Thailand) Prakaisaeng Sit O	Petchpiya, Lumpinee Stadium	Bangkok, Thailand	Decision	5	3:00
Loses his Thailand's Super Welterweight (154lbs) title.
2010-06-19	Win	(France) Abdallah Mabel	Explosion Fight Night Volume 01, Final	Brest, France	Ext.R Decision (Unanimous)	4	3:00
Wins Explosion Fight Night Volume 01 - K1 Rules Tournament (71kg).
2010-06-19	Win	(France) Ludovic Millet	Explosion Fight Night Volume 01, Semi Final	Brest, France	Decision (Unanimous)	3	3:00
2010-03-13	Loss	(Italy) Giorgio Petrosyan	Oktagon presents: It's Showtime 2010	Milan, Italy	Decision (Unanimous)	3	3:00
2010-01-30	Win	(Belgium) Ali Abrayem	La Nuit des Titans	Tours, France	TKO (Corner stoppage/low kicks)	3	
2009-11-28	Win	(Italy) Diego Calzolari	Gotti Promotion presents: Muay Thai	Trieste, Italy	TKO (Corner stop/elbows)	3	
Wins MTA Muaythai World title (69kg).
2009-11-14	Win	(France) Fabio Pinca	La Nuit des Champions 2009	Marseilles, France	Decision (Unanimous)	5	3:00
Wins "Nuit des Champions" Muaythai belt (-67 kg).
2009-09-18	Win	(Thailand) Sudsakorn Sor Klinmee	Kiatpet Fights, Lumpinee Stadium	Bangkok, Thailand	TKO (Referee stoppage)	3	
2009-08-27	Win	(Slovakia) Egon Racz	Thepprasit Fairtex Stadium	Pattaya, Thailand	TKO (Ref stop/knockdowns)	4	
2009-05-16	Win	(Spain) Alex Baena	Légendes et Guerriers	Toulouse, France	Decision (Unanimous)	5	3:00
2009-04-10	Win	(Thailand) Chai Pomee SPR Krungthep		Chon Buri, Thailand	TKO	1	
2009-04-09	Win	(Thailand) Parinya Jockey Gym		Chon Buri, Thailand	Decision (Unanimous)	3	3:00
2009-04-08	Win	(Thailand) Rambo Panyathip		Chon Buri, Thailand	Decision (Unanimous)	3	3:00
2009-03-02	Win	(Thailand) Diesellek TopkingBoxing	Paorungchujaroen, Rajadamnern Stadium	Bangkok, Thailand	Decision (Unanimous)	5	3:00
Wins Thailand's and WMC Muaythai Super Welterweight (154lbs) title.
2009-01-03	Win	(Japan) Shiriya Ishige	M.I.D. Japan presents "Thailand Japan" 2009	Japan	TKO	3	
2008-12-21	Win	(Slovakia) Rudolf Durica	Return of the King II	Paramaribo, Suriname	Decision (Unanimous)	3	3:00
2008-12-05	Win	(Slovakia) Egon Racz	King's Cup WMC/S-1 tournament	Bangkok, Thailand	Decision (Unanimous)	3	3:00
Wins King's Cup WMC/S-1 tournament (160lbs) title.
2008-12-05	Win	(Slovakia) Vladimir Konsky	King's Cup WMC/S-1 tournament	Bangkok, Thailand	Decision (Unanimous)	3	3:00
2008-12-05	Win	(Albania) Aliu Berat	King's Cup WMC/S-1 tournament	Bangkok, Thailand	Decision (Unanimous)	3	3:00
2008-09-22	Win	(Thailand) Big Ben Chor Praram 6	Daorungchujarern, Rajadamnern Stadium	Bangkok, Thailand	Decision (Unanimous)	5	3:00
2008-08-14	Win	(Thailand) Singmanee Sor Srisompong	Jarumueang, Rajadamnern Stadium	Bangkok, Thailand	KO (Right overhand)	5	0:59
2008-06-12	Win	(Thailand) Nopparat Keatkhamtorn	Onesongchai, Rajaphat Institute	Nakhon Pathom, Thailand	Decision (Unanimous)	5	3:00
2008-05-05	Win	(Thailand) Nopparat Keatkhamtorn		Bangkok, Thailand	KO	2	
2008-02-07	Loss	(Thailand) Nopparat Keatkhamtorn	Wanthongchai, Rajadamnern Stadium	Bangkok, Thailand	Decision (Unanimous)	5	3:00
2007-07-20	Win	(Thailand) Kongpipop Petchyindee	Sor.Pumpanmuang, Lumpinee Stadium	Bangkok, Thailand	TKO	5	
2007-05-23	Loss	(Thailand) Nopparat Keatkhamtorn	Sor.Sommai, Rajadamnern Stadium	Bangkok, Thailand	Decision	5	3:00
2007-02-05	Loss	(Thailand) Saenchainoi Wor.Petchpoon	Onesongchai, Rajadamnern Stadium	Bangkok, Thailand	Decision	5	3:00
2006-12-28	Win	(Thailand) Saenchainoi Wor.Petchpoon	Phetthongkam, Rajadamnern Stadium	Bangkok, Thailand	Decision	5	3:00
2006-11-30	Win	(Thailand) Puja Sor.Suwanee	Onesongchai, Rajadamnern Stadium	Bangkok, Thailand	Decision	5	3:00
Wins the Rajadamnern Stadium Super Featherweight (130lbs) title.
2006-10-19	Win	(Thailand) Saenchainoi Saendetgym	Onesongchai, Rajadamnern Stadium	Bangkok, Thailand	Decision (Unanimous)	5	3:00
2006-08-31	Draw	(Thailand) Puja Sor.Suwanee	Onesongchai, Rajadamnern Stadium	Bangkok, Thailand	Decision draw	5	3:00
2006-05-04	Win	(Thailand) Nongbee Kiatyongyut	Kiatyongyuth, Rajadamnern Stadium	Bangkok, Thailand	Decision	5	3:00
2006-03-06	Win	(Thailand) Yodbuangam Lukbanyai	Onesongchai, Rajadamnern Stadium	Bangkok, Thailand	Decision	5	3:00
2005-12-22	Loss	(Thailand) Yodbuangam Lukbanyai	Rajadamnern Celebration Fights	Bangkok, Thailand	TKO	2	
2005-08-05	Win	(Thailand) Sibmean Lamtongkarnpat	Paianun, Rajadamnern Stadium	Bangkok, Thailand	TKO	5	
2005-04-21	Loss	(Thailand) Puja Sor.Suwanee	Onesongchai, Rajadamnern Stadium	Bangkok, Thailand	Decision	5	3:00
2005-02-12	Loss	(Thailand) Saenchai Sor Kingstar	OneSongchai Tsunami Show, Rajamangala Stadium	Bangkok, Thailand	KO (Throw)	4	
2004-12-29	Loss	(Thailand) Nongbee Kiatyongyut	Onesongchai, Rajadamnern Stadium	Bangkok, Thailand	Decision (Unanimous)	5	3:00
2004-10-25	Win	(Thailand) Saenchai Sor Kingstar	Palokmuaythai ITV, Siam Omnoi Stadium	Bangkok, Thailand	Decision (Unanimous)	5	3:00
2004-06-07	Loss	(Thailand) Saenchai Sor Kingstar	Onesongchai, Rajadamnern Stadium	Bangkok, Thailand	Decision (Unanimous)	5	3:00
2004-05-05	Win	(Thailand) Itsarasak Jor.Ratchadakkhon	Jaobunlunglok, Rajadamnern Stadium	Bangkok, Thailand	Decision (Unanimous)	5	3:00
2004-03-04	Win	(Thailand) Phet-Ek Sitjaopho	Onesongchai, Rajadamnern Stadium	Bangkok, Thailand	Decision (Unanimous)	5	3:00
2003-11-26	Loss	(Thailand) Puja Sor.Suwanee	Petchtongkam, Rajadamnern Stadium	Bangkok, Thailand	Decision (Unanimous)	5	3:00
2003-10-16	Win	(Thailand) Pornpitak Petchaudomchai	Onesongchai, Rajadamnern Stadium	Bangkok, Thailand	Decision (Unanimous)	5	3:00
2003-	Loss	(Thailand) Klairung Sor.Chaicharoen		Bangkok, Thailand	Decision	5	3:00
Loses the Thailand Super Bantamweight (122 lbs) title.
2002-	Win	(Thailand) Phetto Sitjaopho	Rajadamnern Stadium	Bangkok, Thailand	Decision	5	3:00
2002-	Win	(Thailand) Phet-Ek Sitjaopho	Rajadamnern Stadium	Bangkok, Thailand	Decision	5	3:00
2002-	Win	(Thailand) Sangnoi Kiatpraphat	Rajadamnern Stadium	Bangkok, Thailand	Decision	5	3:00
2002-	Win	(Thailand) Puja Sor.Suwanee	Rajadamnern Stadium	Bangkok, Thailand	Decision	5	3:00
2002-07-04	Win	(Thailand) Ngathao Attharungroj	Rajadamnern Stadium	Bangkok, Thailand	Decision	5	3:00
2002-	Win	(Thailand) Dendanai Kiatsakkongka	Rajadamnern Stadium	Bangkok, Thailand	Decision	5	3:00
2002-	Win	(Thailand) Thepbancha Sitmonchai	Rajadamnern Stadium	Bangkok, Thailand	KO	1	
2002-	Win	(Thailand) Sornnoi Pornsawan Minimart	Rajadamnern Stadium	Bangkok, Thailand	TKO	4	
Legend: Win Loss Draw/No contest Notes

Amateur Muay Thai record
Date	Result	Opponent	Event	Location	Method	Round	Time
2012-09-11	Loss	(Belarus) Vitaly Gurkov	IFMA 2012 World Muaythai Championships, 1/2 final (71 kg)	Saint Petersburg, Russia	Decision (Majority)	4	2:00
Wins 2012 I.F.M.A. World Muaythai Championships Bronze Medal -71kg.
2012-09-10	Win	(Kazakhstan) Smagulov Almas	IFMA 2012 World Muaythai Championships, 1/4 final (71 kg)	Saint Petersburg, Russia	Decision	4	2:00
2012-09-08	Win	(Uzbekistan) Azizbek Nazarov	IFMA 2012 World Muaythai Championships, 2nd Round (71 kg)	Saint Petersburg, Russia	KO	1	
2012-09-07	Win	(Finland) Jarkko Kekaraien	IFMA 2012 World Muaythai Championships, 1st Round (71 kg)	Saint Petersburg, Russia	Decision	4	2:00
Legend: Win Loss Draw/No contest Notes

== See also ==
- List of male kickboxers
