= Attachai Fairtex =

Thai former professional Muay Thai fighter

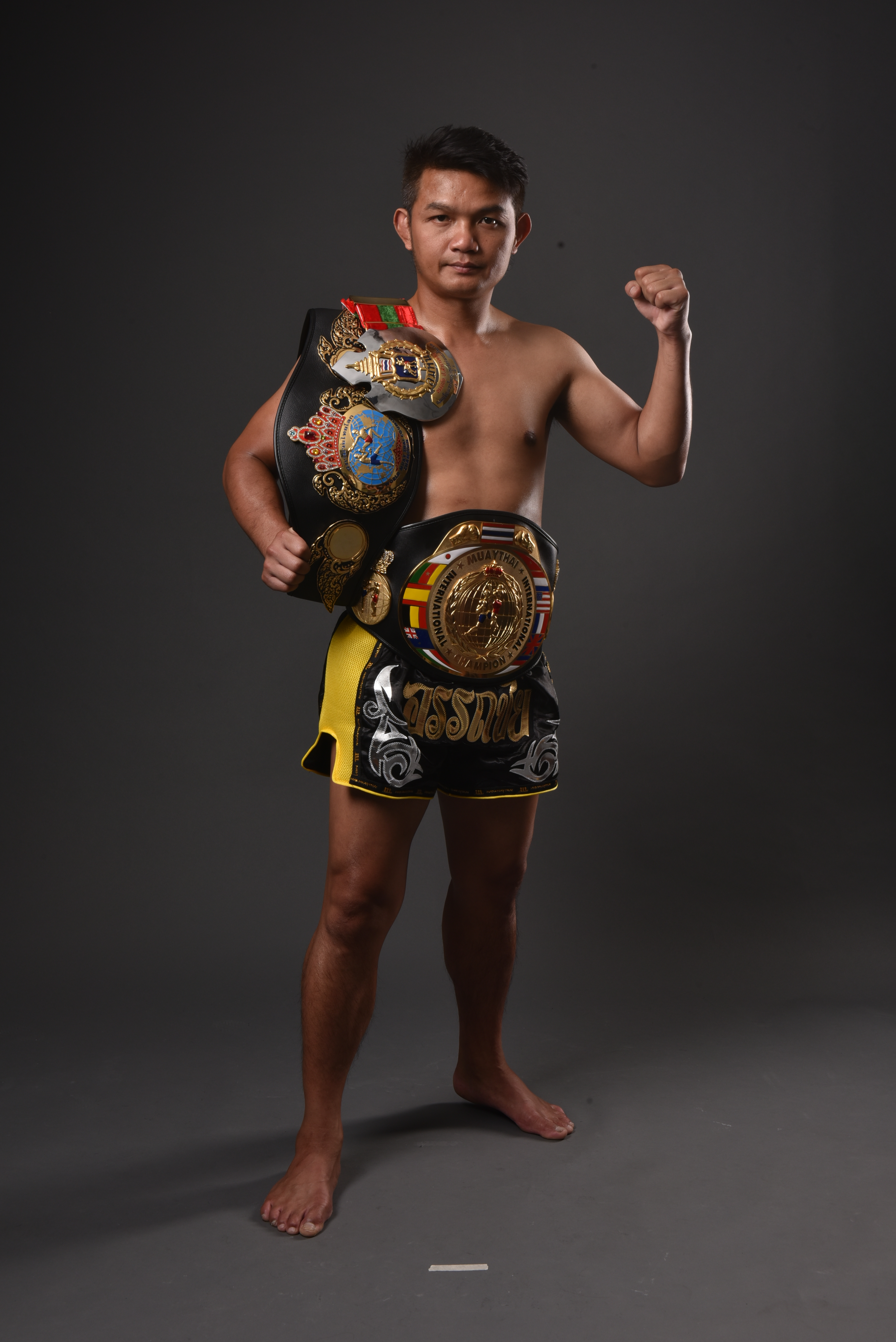
- Attachai in 2016
- Born: Pornsak Bunrat; May 29, 1980 (age 46); Rattanaburi, Surin, Thailand
- Other names: Attachai Por.Yosanan (อรรถชัย ป.ยศนันท์); Attachai Por.Samranchai (อรรถชัย ป.สำราญชัย); Attachai Nor.Siripung (อรรถชัย น.ศรีผึ้ง); Attchai Wor.Wiratchai (อรรถชัย จ.วิรัชชัย)
- Nickname: Divine Left (ซ้ายเทวดา)
- Height: 169 cm (5 ft 7 in)
- Division: Light Flyweight; Super Bantamweight
- Style: Muay Thai (Muay Femur)
- Stance: Southpaw
- Years active: c. 1989–2009

Kickboxing record
- Total: 200
- Wins: 180
- Losses: 15
- Draws: 5

Pornsak Bunrat (Thai: พรศักดิ์ บุญรัตน์; born May 29, 1980), known professionally as Attachai Fairtex (Thai: อรรถชัย แฟร์เท็กซ์), is a Thai former professional Muay Thai fighter. He is a former Lumpinee Stadium Super Bantamweight Champion. With 200 professional Muay Thai fights and a 90% win record (180–15–5), he has been voted as one of the greatest fighters of his era by Thai media.

He is a certified Muay Thai instructor from the Fairtex Camp in Thailand and has taught at various gyms in Thailand, the United States, and Singapore. He now runs his own gym in Thailand – Attachai Muay Thai Gym.

== Biography ==
=== Early life ===
Attachai was born in Rattanaburi, a poor village in the province of Surin. Muay Thai was a means for him to bring money home for his family. He started training at the age of 8. Muay Thai runs in Attachai's family and his cousin, Chaiya Sor Supawan, was also a champion in Lumpinee Boxing Stadium. When Attachai was 12 years old, his parents could no longer afford to provide for all 4 of their children. Seeing Attachai win all his fights in his hometown, his cousin saw potential in him and decided to bring him to Bangkok to train at Por Somranchai Gym to provide him with a better training environment and ease his family's financial strain.

=== Rising through the ranks ===
While in Bangkok, Attachai trained and fought, becoming a rising star in the Sukonesongchai promotions. Attachai fought his way up to the highest levels in the Lumpinee and Rajadamnern stadiums to face many of the greatest Muay Thai fighters of his era including Saenchai Sor.Kingstar, Lamnamoon Sor.Sumalee, Anuwat Kaewsamrit, Namkabuan Nongkeepahuyuth, Therdkiat Kiatrungroj, Singdam Kiatmuu9, Samkor Chor.Rathchatasupak, Namsaknoi Yudthagarngamtorn, Mathee Jadeepitak, Kaoponglek Luksuratham, Muangfahlek Kiatwichian, Nopparat Keatkhamtorn, and Orono Wor.Petchpun.

=== Transition to boxing ===
At 23 years old, Attachai made the switch to boxing. Under the instruction of Somluck Kamsing – the first Thai athlete to win a gold medal in the Olympics, in boxing at the 1996 Olympics, Attachai competed in many boxing tournaments; notably the Amateur Boxing Association of Thailand under the "Royal Patronage of His Majesty the King", in which he emerged as the champion. He also represented the Royal Thai Police in the Kings Cup Boxing tournament – winning a silver.

=== Fighting internationally ===
When Attachai was 26 years old, he was bought over by the world-famous Fairtex camp to make his return to fighting in Muay Thai. Alongside training with Attachai were fighters such as Kaew Fairtex, Yodsanklai Fairtex and Naruepol Fairtex; who have all grown to become the biggest stars of Fairtex Gym, Pattaya. Attachai represented Fairtex and won numerous fights in France, United States of America and Japan. He won a total of 180 fights out of his 200 professional fights.

=== Life after fighting ===
Attachai retired from fighting at the age of 31 to become a full-time Muay Thai instructor. He first joined Kanomtom Gym Thailand as an instructor assisting in the fighters' training programmes. He was then invited to work in Florida at Tampa Muay Thai Gym, a sister company of Kanomtom Gym. In 2011, Attachai was head hunted by Evolve Mixed Martial Arts (Singapore) – One of the largest martial arts gyms in Asia. Attachai worked alongside the other World Champion instructors at Evolve Mixed Martial Arts for 4 years. In 2015, Attachai left joined Trifecta Mixed Martial Arts as their Muay Thai instructor and led their competition team. Attachai now runs his own gym in Thailand – Attachai Muay Thai Gym.

== Titles and accomplishments ==
- Lumpinee Stadium
  - 1997 Lumpinee Stadium Super Bantamweight (122 lbs) Champion
    - One successful title defense
  - 1997 Lumpinee Stadium Fighter of the Year
  - 1998 Lumpinee Stadium Fighter of the Year
- Professional Boxing Association of Thailand (PAT)
  - Thailand Light Flyweight (108 lbs) Champion
- World Muay Thai Council
  - 1995 WMC World Light Flyweight (108 lbs) Champion

Awards

- 1997 Sports Authority of Thailand Fighter of the Year

== Fight record ==
Professional Fight Record
180 wins, 15 losses, 5 draws
| Date | Result | Opponent | Event | Location | Method | Round | Time |
| 2009-06-20 | Loss | (Thailand) Sudsakorn Sor Klinmee | Le Grand Défi | Levallois-Perret, France | Decision | 5 | 3:00 |
| 2009-05-19 | Loss | (Thailand) Saenchainoi ToyotaRayong | Fairtex, Lumpinee Stadium | Bangkok, Thailand | Decision (Unanimous) | 5 | 3:00 |
| 2009-03-07 | Loss | (Thailand) Saenchainoi ToyotaRayong | Lumpinee Krikrai, Lumpinee Stadium | Bangkok, Thailand | Decision | 5 | 3:00 |
| 2009-01-18 | Win | (Mongolia) Tsogto Amara | Muay Lok Japan 2009-The Greatest Muay Thai Festival- | Tokyo, Japan | Decision (Unanimous) | 5 | 3:00 |
| 2008-2009 | Loss | (Thailand) Diesellek TopkingBoxing | Rajadamnern Stadium | Bangkok, Thailand | Decision | 5 | 3:00 |
| 2008-10-26 | Win | (Thailand) Petchmankong Petchfergus | Lumpinee Stadium | Bangkok, Thailand | Decision | 5 | 3:00 |
| 2008-10-03 | Win | (Thailand) Therdkiet Kiatroengroed | Lumpinee Stadium | Bangkok, Thailand | Decision | 5 | 3:00 |
| 2008-06-12 | Win | (France) Fabio Pinca | Gala de Levallois | Levallois-Perret, France | Decision (Unanimous) | 5 | 3:00 |
| 2008-04-29 | Loss | (Thailand) Saenchainoi ToyotaRayong | Paironan, Lumpinee Stadium | Bangkok, Thailand | Decision | 5 | 3:00 |
| 2008-01-26 | Win | (Netherlands) Hassan Ait Bassou | La Nuit Des Titans | Tours, France | Decision (Unanimous) | 3 | 3:00 |
| 2007-11-23 | Win | (Japan) Yohei Sakurai | NJKF FIGHTING EVOLUTION XIII | Tokyo, Japan | KO (Left uppercut to the body) | 3 | 2:00 |
| 2007-10-27 | Win | (France) Fabio Pinca | One Night in Bangkok | Antwerp, Belgium | Decision | 5 | 3:00 |
| 2007-09-24 | Win | (Japan) Atsushi Suzuki | M-1 MUAY THAI HEARTY SMILES | Japan | TKO (Teeps) | 4 | 1:14 |
| 2007-06-16 | Win | (France) Farid Khider | La Nuit des Superfights VIII | Paris, France | Decision (Unanimous) | 5 | 3:00 |
| 2007-06-03 | Win | (Japan) Susumu Daiguji | M-1 FAIRTEX SINGHA BEER Muay Thai Challenge | Tokyo, Japan | TKO (Corner stoppage) | 4 | 1:33 |
| 2007-04-20 | Win | (France) Kamel Jemel | Le défi des champions | Levallois-Perret, France | Decision | 5 | 3:00 |
| 2007-04-03 | Loss | (Thailand) Singdam Kiatmuu9 | Lumpinee Stadium | Bangkok, Thailand | Decision | 5 | 3:00 |
| 2007-02-06 | Win | (Thailand) Kongpipop Petchyindee | Fairtex, Lumpinee Stadium | Bangkok, Thailand | Decision (Unanimous) | 5 | 3:00 |
| 2006-11-17 | Loss | (Thailand) Kongpipop Petchyindee | Gaiyanghadao Tournament, Semi Final | Nakhon Ratchasima, Thailand | KO (Left knee to the body) | 2 | |
| 2006-11-17 | Win | (Thailand) Sagatpetch IngramGym | Gaiyanghadao Tournament, Quarter Final | Nakhon Ratchasima, Thailand | Decision | 3 | 3:00 |
| 2006-10-17 | Win | (Thailand) Nopparat Keatkhamtorn | Phetpiya, Lumpinee Stadium | Bangkok, Thailand | KO (Left knee to the body) | 4 | 0:48 |
| 2006-08-08 | Win | (Thailand) Singdam Kiatmuu9 | Fairtex, Lumpinee Stadium | Bangkok, Thailand | Decision | 5 | 3:00 |
| 2006-05-23 | Win | (Thailand) Kongpipop Petchyindee | Fairtex, Lumpinee Stadium | Bangkok, Thailand | Decision | 5 | 3:00 |
| 2006-03-24 | Loss | (Thailand) Orono Wor Petchpun | Wanboonya, Lumpinee Stadium | Bangkok, Thailand | Decision | 5 | 3:00 |
| 2006-02-10 | Loss | (Thailand) Singdam Kiatmuu9 | Fairtex, Lumpinee Stadium | Bangkok, Thailand | Decision (Unanimous) | 5 | 3:00 |
| 2005-12-20 | Loss | (Thailand) Nopparat Keatkhamtorn | Wanboonya, Lumpinee Stadium | Bangkok, Thailand | Decision | 5 | 3:00 |
| 2005-08-11 | Loss | (Thailand) Yodbuangam Lukbanyai | Onesongchai, Sanam Luang | Bangkok, Thailand | Decision | 5 | 3:00 |
| 2005-06-22 | Win | (Thailand) Anuwat Kaewsamrit | Kiatsingnoi, Rajadamnern Stadium | Bangkok, Thailand | Decision (Unanimous) | 5 | 3:00 |
| 2005-02-12 | Win | (Thailand) Chalermpol Kiatsunanta | Onesongchai, Rajadamnern Stadium | Bangkok, Thailand | KO (Left elbow) | 2 | 4:48 |
| 2004-12-29 | Win | (Thailand) Klairung Sor.SasipaGym | Onseongchai, Rajadamnern Stadium | Bangkok, Thailand | KO (Knees and punches) | 2 | |
| 2004-10-25 | Loss | (Thailand) Nongbee Kiatyongyut | Omnoi Stadium | Samut Sakhon, Thailand | Decision (Unanimous) | 5 | 3:00 |
| 2004-09-11 | Win | (Thailand) Khunpinit Kiattawan | Suekjao Muaythai, Omnoi Stadium | Bangkok, Thailand | Decision (Unanimous) | 5 | 3:00 |
| 2004 | Win | (Thailand) Lamnamoon Sor.Sumalee | Lumpinee Stadium | Bangkok, Thailand | KO | 1 | 1:36 |
| 2003 | Loss | (Thailand) Samkor Kiatmontep | Lumpinee Stadium | Bangkok, Thailand | Decision | 5 | 3:00 |
| 2002-09-26 | Win | (Thailand) Sakawthong Phetnongnooch | Onesongchai, Lumpinee Stadium | Bangkok, Thailand | TKO (Doctor stoppage) | 4 | 3:00 |
| 2002-08-07 | Loss | (Thailand) Saenchai Sor Kingstar | Lumpinee Stadium | Bangkok, Thailand | Decision | 5 | 3:00 |
| 2002-07-06 | Loss | (France) Kamel Jemel | Le Grand Tournoi | Paris, France | Disqualification | 1 | |
| 2002 | Win | (Thailand) Rambojiew Por.Thubtim | Lumpinee Stadium | Bangkok, Thailand | KO | 4 | 3:00 |
| 2002 | Win | (Thailand) Samkor Kiatmontep | Lumpinee Stadium | Bangkok, Thailand | Decision | 5 | 3:00 |
| 2001-12-05 | Win | (China) Wang Jin Feng | King's Birthday | Bangkok, Thailand | KO (Knee and punches to the body) | 2 | |
| 2001- | Win | (Thailand) Muangfahlek Kiatwichian | Rajadamnern Stadium | Bangkok, Thailand | Decision | 5 | 3:00 |
| 2001-09-05 | Win | (Thailand) Kaoponglek Luksuratham | Onesongchai, Rajadamnern Stadium | Bangkok, Thailand | Decision (Unanimous) | 5 | 3:00 |
| 2001-07-19 | Win | (Thailand) Rambojiew Dongolfservice | Onesongchai, Rajadamnern Stadium | Bangkok, Thailand | KO (Left high kick) | 4 | |
| 2001-04-05 | Loss | (Thailand) Saenchai Sor.Kingstar | Onesongchai, Rajadamnern Stadium | Bangkok, Thailand | Decision | 5 | 3:00 |
| 2001-01-25 | Win | (Thailand) Khunpinit Kiattawan | Onesongchai, Rajadamnern Stadium | Bangkok, Thailand | Decision (Unanimous) | 5 | 3:00 |
| 2000-12-02 | Loss | (Thailand) Samkor Ratchatasupak | Lumpinee Stadium | Bangkok, Thailand | Decision (Unanimous) | 5 | 3:00 |
For the Lumpinee Stadium Super Featherweight (130 lbs) title.
| 2000-10-06 | Draw | (Thailand) Saenchai Sor Kingstar | Onesongchai, Lumpinee Stadium | Bangkok, Thailand | Decision (Unanimous) | 5 | 3:00 |
| 2000-09-09 | Win | (Thailand) Therdkiat Kiatrungroj | Lumpinee Stadium | Bangkok, Thailand | Decision (Unanimous) | 5 | 3:00 |
| 2000-08-05 | Loss | (Thailand) Rambojiew Dongolfservice | Lumpinee Stadium | Bangkok, Thailand | Decision (Unanimous) | 5 | 3:00 |
| 2000 | Win | (Thailand) Khochasarn Singklongsi | Lumpinee Stadium | Bangkok, Thailand | Decision | 5 | 3:00 |
| 2000-07-08 | Win | (France) Kamel Jemel | Muay Thai in Las Vegas | Las Vegas, United States | TKO (Left high kick) | 3 | |
| 2000-06-02 | Win | (Thailand) Lamnamoon Sor.Sumalee | Onesongchai, Lumpinee Stadium | Bangkok, Thailand | KO (Left elbow) | 3 | |
| 2000-04-04 | Loss | (Thailand) Saenchai Sor Kingstar | Lumpinee Stadium | Bangkok, Thailand | Decision | 5 | 3:00 |
| 2000-03-10 | Win | (Japan) Hideaki Suzuki | NJKF "Millennium Wars 2" | Japan | Decision (Unanimous) | 5 | 3:00 |
| 2000-03-03 | Loss | (Thailand) Saenchai Sor Kingstar | Onesongchai, Lumpinee Stadium | Bangkok, Thailand | Decision | 5 | 3:00 |
| 2000 | Win | (Thailand) Mathee Jadeepitak | Lumpinee Stadium | Bangkok, Thailand | Decision | 5 | 3:00 |
| 2000-02-05 | Draw | (Thailand) Namsaknoi Yudthagarngamtorn | Lumpinee Stadium | Bangkok, Thailand | Decision | 5 | 3:00 |
For the vacant Lumpinee Stadium Super Featherweight (130 lbs) title. Namksanoi was stripped of the title after missing weight, only Attachai was eligible to win the title.
| 1999-12-17 | Win | (Thailand) Chokdee Por.Pramuk | Por.Pramuk | Bangkok, Thailand | KO | 3 | |
| 1999-10-31 | Loss | (Thailand) Lamnamoon Sor.Sumalee | | Ubon Ratchathani, Thailand | Decision | 5 | 3:00 |
| 1999- | Loss | (Thailand) Mathee Jadeepitak | Lumpinee Stadium | Bangkok, Thailand | Decision | 5 | 3:00 |
| 1999-05-11 | Loss | (Thailand) Khunsuk Phetsupaphan | | Bangkok, Thailand | Decision (Unanimous) | 5 | 3:00 |
For the Lumpinee Stadium Super Featherweight (130 lbs) title.
| 1999-03-26 | Win | (Thailand) Therdkiat Kiatrungroj | Lumpinee Stadium | Bangkok, Thailand | Decision | 5 | 3:00 |
Wins 1 million baht side-bet.
| 1999-02-10 | Loss | (Thailand) Samkor Chor.Rathchatasupak | Daorung Sor.Wanchat, Lumpinee Stadium | Bangkok, Thailand | Decision | 5 | 3:00 |
| 1998-12-25 | Win | (Japan) Hideaki Suzuki | NJKF | Japan | Decision (Unanimous) | 5 | 3:00 |
| 1998-12-08 | Loss | (Thailand) Samkor Ratchatasupak | Onesongchai, Lumpinee Stadium | Bangkok, Thailand | Decision (Unanimous) | 5 | 3:00 |
| 1998-10-26 | Win | (Thailand) Samkor Ratchatasupak | Kiatsingnoi, Rajadamnern Stadium | Bangkok, Thailand | Decision (Unanimous) | 5 | 3:00 |
| 1998-09-29 | Win | (Thailand) Namkabuan Nongkeepahuyuth | Lumpinee Stadium | Bangkok, Thailand | Decision (Unanimous) | 5 | 3:00 |
Receives the Yodmuaythai trophy.
| 1998-08-07 | Win | (Thailand) Namkabuan Nongkeepahuyuth | Lumpinee Stadium | Bangkok, Thailand | Decision (Unanimous) | 5 | 3:00 |
| 1998-06-26 | Win | (Thailand) Mathee Jadeepitak | Onesongchai, Lumpinee Stadium | Bangkok, Thailand | Decision (Unanimous) | 5 | 3:00 |
| 1998-05-26 | Win | (Thailand) Lamnamoon Sor.Sumalee | Onesongchai, Lumpinee Stadium | Bangkok, Thailand | Decision (Unanimous) | 5 | 3:00 |
| 1998-03-02 | Win | (Thailand) Muangfahlek Kiatwichian | Rajadamnern Stadium | Bangkok, Thailand | Decision (Unanimous) | 5 | 3:00 |
| 1998-02-03 | Loss | (Thailand) Mathee Jadeepitak | Onesongchai, Lumpinee Stadium | Bangkok, Thailand | Decision (Unanimous) | 5 | 3:00 |
| 1997-11-28 | Win | (Thailand) Khochasarn Singklongsi | Onesongchai, Lumpinee Stadium | Bangkok, Thailand | Decision | 5 | 3:00 |
Defends the Lumpinee Stadium Super Bantamweight (122 lbs) title.
| 1997-09-19 | Win | (Thailand) Ritthichai Lukjaopordam | Lumpinee Stadium | Bangkok, Thailand | Decision | 5 | 3:00 |
Wins the Lumpinee Stadium Super Bantamweight (122 lbs) title.
| 1997-05-23 | Win | (Thailand) Baiphet Lookjaomesaiwaree | Onesongchai, Lumpinee Stadium | Bangkok, Thailand | Decision (Unanimous) | 5 | 3:00 |
| 1997- | Win | (Thailand) Sakubon Por.Muangubon | Lumpinee Stadium | Bangkok, Thailand | KO | 3 | |
| 1997- | Win | (Thailand) Nuengsiam Fairtex | Lumpinee Stadium | Bangkok, Thailand | Decision | 5 | 3:00 |
| 1997- | Win | (Thailand) Pichai Wor.Walapon | Lumpinee Stadium | Bangkok, Thailand | Decision | 5 | 3:00 |
| 1996-05-30 | Win | (Thailand) Plathong JockyGym | Rajadamnern Stadium | Bangkok, Thailand | KO (Punch) | 4 | |
| 1995-12-11 | Win | (Thailand) Kompayak Singmanee | Rajadamnern Stadium | Bangkok, Thailand | Decision | 5 | 3:00 |
| 1995-11-13 | Win | (Thailand) Kongkiat Sitchunthong | Rajadamnern Stadium | Bangkok, Thailand | Decision | 5 | 3:00 |
| 1995-08-21 | Win | (Thailand) Faphet Petchmuangwiset | Rajadamnern Stadium | Bangkok, Thailand | Decision | 5 | 3:00 |
| 1995- | Win | (Thailand) Saenkaeng Sor.Weerakul | Nimitbut Stadium World MT Champion | Thailand | Decision | 5 | 3:00 |
Wins the WMC World Super Flyweight (108 lbs) title.
| 1995- | Win | (Thailand) Kompayak Singmanee | Rajadamnern Stadium | Bangkok, Thailand | Decision | 5 | 3:00 |
| 1995- | Win | (Thailand) Fighta PlalanGroup | Rajadamnern Stadium | Bangkok, Thailand | Decision | 5 | 3:00 |
| 1995-03-13 | Draw | (Thailand) Krataithong Kiatmontep | Rajadamnern Stadium | Bangkok, Thailand | Decision (Majority) | 5 | 3:00 |
| 1994-12-19 | Win | (Thailand) Sak-Amorn Sor.Siamchai | Rajadamnern Stadium | Bangkok, Thailand | Decision | 5 | 3:00 |
| 1994- | Win | (Thailand) Kaewsod Sor.Nowarat | Rajadamnern Stadium | Bangkok, Thailand | Decision | 5 | 3:00 |
Legend: Win Loss Draw/No contest Notes
