= Sanghiran Lukbanyai =

Thai Muay Thai kickboxer and boxer

Sanghiran
- Born: Adiran Chanthong; June 12, 1980 (age 46); Trang province, Thailand
- Other names: Satolek (The Iron Bitter Bean); Hardcore; Sanghirun; Sangheeran Lookbanyai; Saenghiran Kratindaenggym (แสงหิรัญ กระทิงแดงยิม)
- Height: 1.68 m (5 ft 6 in)
- Weight: 55 kg (121 lb; 8 st 9 lb)
- Style: Muay Mat
- Stance: Orthodox
- Fighting out of: Bangkok, Thailand
- Team: Lukbanyai

Professional boxing record
- Total: 24
- Wins: 21
- By knockout: 15
- Losses: 2
- By knockout: 2
- Draws: 1

Other information
- Occupation: Muay Thai trainer
- Boxing record from BoxRec

Sanghiran Lukbanyai (Thai: แสงหิรัญ ลูกบ้านใหญ่) is a retired Thai Muay Thai fighter and boxer.

== Biography and career ==
Sanghiran was born Adiran Chanthong on June 12, 1980, in the Trang province. He started to train in Muay Thai under his father at the age of 7. During his youth he used the ring name Sanghiran Sor.Piromthong when competing in various southern provinces. At the age of 13 he was sent to the Lukbanyai camp in Bangkok where he started to compete in the Rajadamnern Stadium for the Aswindam promotion. He later joined the Kiatpetch promotion.

Sanghiran became a popular fighter on the circuit, he captured the Lumpinee and Thailand 122 lbs titles in 2000 by knocking out Nontachai Sit-O. The biggest payday of his muay thai career came in 2002 when he lost to legendary fighter Saenchai, Sanghiran received 120,000 baht for this bout. His heavy handed style granted him opportunities to compete in boxing, he made the transition full time in 2003.

Sanghiran won 20 bouts in a row in boxing before facing his countrymen Napapol Sor Rungvisai in a WBC Super Bantamweight title eliminator fight. The contest had to be postponed a first time due to Sanghiran getting surgery for appendicitis. The bout finally happened on September 20, 2007. Sanghiran was stopped in the 10th round from body shots. Sanghiran never recaptured his previous form in boxing and made a return to muay thai which saw him won the Channel 7 Stadium 126 lbs title.

After his fighting career Sanghiran became a Muay Thai trainer at Evolve MMA in Singapore starting in 2013. When he came back to Thailand he became head trainer at the Sor.Dechapan gym. Sanghiran was elected Lumpinee Coach of the Year in 2017, he took care of a group of boxers who managed to win 25 combined fights in a row that year. Sanghiran has been a coach in China since 2018.

== Titles and accomplishments ==
- Lumpinee Stadium
  - 2000 Lumpinee Stadium 122 lbs Champion
- Professional Boxing Association of Thailand (PAT)
  - 2000 Thailand 122 lbs Champion
- Channel 7 Boxing Stadium
  - 2008 Channel 7 Stadium 126 lbs Champion

Awards

- 2017 Lumpinee Stadium Coach of the Year

== Professional boxing record ==
24 fights	21 wins	2 losses
By knockout	15	2
By decision	6	0
Draws	1	

No.	Result	Record	Opponent	Type	Round, time	Date	Location	Notes
24	Loss	22–2-1	Akifumi Shimoda	TKO	6 (8)	Oct 10, 2009	Yoyogi #2 Gymnasium, Tokyo, Japan	
23	Draw	22–1-1	Zaiki Takemoto	SD	10	Mar 20, 2008	Sambo Hall, Kobe, Japan	
22	Win	22–1	Jaime Barcelona	UD	10	Nov 11, 2007	Nonthaburi, Thailand	
21	Loss	20–1	Napapol Sor Rungvisai	KO	10 (12)	Sep 20, 2007	Bangplama School, Suphan Buri, Thailand	WBC Super Bantamweight title eliminator.
20	Win	20–0	Jesar Ancajas	KO	3 (10)	Sep 24, 2006	Central Plaza, Rama II, Bangkok, Thailand	
19	Win	19–0	Roberto Dalisay	TKO	9 (10)	Jun 27, 2006	Lumpinee Stadium, Bangkok, Thailand	
18	Win	18–0	Rico Genon	KO	1 (12)	Mar 20, 2006	Sukhothai Thammathirat University, Muang Thong Thani, Thailand	Retains the WBC Asian Super Bantamweight title.
17	Win	17–0	Roberto Dalisay	TKO	5 (12)	Jan 30, 2006	Taladthai Market, Pathum Thani, Thailand	Retains the WBC Asian Super Bantamweight title.
16	Win	16–0	Jack Asis	UD	12	Dec 16, 2005	Huayyod School, Trang, Thailand	Retains the WBC Asian Super Bantamweight title.
15	Win	15–0	Julius Tarona	TKO	6 (12)	Nov 3, 2005	Ocean Plaza, Nakhon Si Thammarat, Thailand	Retains the WBC Asian Super Bantamweight title.
14	Win	14–0	Joven Jorda	KO	3 (12)	Sep 21, 2005	Patavikorn Market, Bangkok, Thailand	Retains the WBC Asian Super Bantamweight title.
13	Win	13–0	Jack Asis	TKO	4 (12)	Aug 1, 2005	Ritthinarongron School, Bangkokyai, Bangkok, Thailand	Retains the WBC Asian Super Bantamweight title.
12	Win	12–0	Jun Magsipoc	TKO	4 (12)	Jun 7, 2005	Huaykwang Sports Stadium, Bangkok, Thailand	Retains the WBC Asian Super Bantamweight title.
11	Win	11–0	Rodel Orais	TKO	4 (12)	Mar 28, 2005	Rachabhak University, Nakhon Ratchasima, Thailand	Retains the WBC Asian Super Bantamweight title.
10	Win	10–0	Dondon Lapuz	UD	12	Oct 27, 2004	Si Sa Ket, Thailand	Retains the interim WBC Asian Super Bantamweight title.
9	Win	9–0	Pederito Laurente	KO	9 (12)	Sep 3, 2004	Nakhon Ratchasima, Thailand	Won the interim WBC Asian Super Bantamweight title.
8	Win	8–0	Rolly Lunas	UD	12	May 31, 2004	Mongkutkasat School, Bangkok, Thailand	Retains the WBC Asian Bantamweight title.
7	Win	7–0	Noel Sungahid	KO	2 (12)	Mar 22, 2004	Nonthaburi, Thailand	Retains the WBC Asian Bantamweight title.
6	Win	6–0	Abi Metiaman	KO	4 (6)	Feb 18, 2004	Mae Sod, Thailand	
5	Win	5–0	Rommel Libradilla	KO	3 (6)	Nov 24, 2003	Rajadamnern Stadium, Bangkok, Thailand	
4	Win	4–0	Jess Maca	KO	2 (12)	Sep 9, 2003	Bangkok, Thailand	Retains the WBC Asian Bantamweight title.
3	Win	3–0	Rolando Gerongco	TKO	3 (12)	Jul 8, 2003	Patavikorn Market, Bangkok, Thailand	Won the vacant WBC Asian Bantamweight title.
2	Win	2–0	Christian Casino	TKO	3 (6)	Apr 23, 2003	Bangkok, Thailand	
1	Win	1–0	Pablo Boy Guevarra	UD	8	Mar 7, 2003	Nakhon Sawan, Thailand	

== Muay Thai record ==
Bangkok Muay Thai record
50 Wins (10 (T)KOs), 23 Losses, 2 Draws
Date	Result	Opponent	Event	Location	Method	Round	Time
2012-02-18	Win	(Thailand) Kongbeng Mor.Rattanabundit	Omnoi Stadium	Samut Sakhon, Thailand	KO	1	
2011-11-20	Win	(Japan) Hideki Soga	SNKA KICK Relations	Tokyo, Japan	Decision (Majority)	5	3:00
2011-11-13	Loss	(Thailand) Aphisit KT Gym	Channel 7 Stadium	Bangkok, Thailand	Decision	5	3:00
2011-08-07	Loss	(Thailand) Wanchalerm Uddonmuang	Channel 7 Stadium	Bangkok, Thailand	Decision	5	3:00
2011-06-05	Win	(Thailand) Fahmai Skindewgym	Channel 7 Stadium	Bangkok, Thailand	Decision	5	3:00
2011-03-20	Loss	(Thailand) Penek Sitnumnoi		Thailand	Decision	5	3:00
2011-01-25	Loss	(Thailand) Pokaew Fonjangchonburi	Lumpinee Stadium	Bangkok, Thailand	Decision	5	3:00
2010-10-26	Win	(Thailand) Pinsiam Sor.Amnuaysirichoke	Lumpinee Stadium	Bangkok, Thailand	Decision	5	3:00
2010-08-04	Win	(Thailand) Phetto Sitjaopho	Rajadamnern Stadium	Bangkok, Thailand	Decision	5	3:00
2010-06-22	Win	(Thailand) Yodsuper Naratreekul	Lumpinee Stadium	Bangkok, Thailand	Decision	5	3:00
2010-04-27	Loss	(Thailand) Phetek Kiatyongyut	Lumpinee Stadium	Bangkok, Thailand	Decision	5	3:00
2010-03-19	Loss	(Thailand) Penek Sitnumnoi	Lumpinee Stadium	Bangkok, Thailand	Decision	5	3:00
2009-02-23	Loss	(Thailand) Fahmai Skindewgym	Rajadamnern Stadium	Bangkok, Thailand	Decision	5	3:00
2009-01-18	Loss	(Thailand) Fahmai Skindewgym	Channel 7 Stadium	Bangkok, Thailand	Decision	5	3:00
2008-12-09	Loss	(Thailand) Petchboonchu FA Group	Lumpinee Stadium	Bangkok, Thailand	Decision	5	3:00
2008-10-12	Win	(Thailand) Santiphap Sit-Ubon	Channel 7 Stadium	Bangkok, Thailand	Decision	5	3:00
Wins the vacant Channel 7 Stadium 126 lbs title.
2008-07-06	Loss	(Thailand) Sakunphetlek Sit-Ubon	Channel 7 Stadium	Bangkok, Thailand	Decision	5	3:00
2008-04-27	Win	(Thailand) Petnumsang Sor.Apichardtrakun	Channel 7 Stadium	Bangkok, Thailand	KO (Punches)	1	
2003-01-10	Loss	(Thailand) Watcharachai Kaewsamrit	Rajadamnern Stadium	Bangkok, Thailand	Decision	5	3:00
2002-12-03	Loss	(Thailand) Saenchai Sor.Kingstar	Lumpinee Stadium	Bangkok, Thailand	Decision	5	3:00
2002-	Loss	(Thailand) Phet-Ek Sitjaopho	Lumpinee Stadium	Bangkok, Thailand	Decision	5	3:00
Loses the Thailand 122 lbs title.
2002-09-27	Win	(Thailand) Kongpipop Petchyindee	Lumpinee Stadium	Bangkok, Thailand	Decision	5	3:00
2002-08-09	Win	(Thailand) Anuwat Kaewsamrit	Lumpinee Stadium	Bangkok, Thailand	Decision	5	3:00
2002-07-05	Win	(Thailand) Pornpitak PhetUdom	Lumpinee Stadium	Bangkok, Thailand	Decision	5	3:00
2002-04-05	Win	(Thailand) Watcharachai Kaewsamrit	Lumpinee Stadium	Bangkok, Thailand	KO (Punches)	3	
Defends the Lumpinee Stadium 122 lbs title.
2002-03-11	Loss	(Thailand) Watcharachai Kaewsamrit	Rajadamnern Stadium	Bangkok, Thailand	Decision	5	3:00
2002-02-15	Win	(Thailand) Dao-Udon Por.Yosanan	Lumpinee Stadium	Bangkok, Thailand	KO (Punch)	3	
2001-12-30	Win	(Thailand) Watcharachai Kaewsamrit	Channel 7 Stadium	Bangkok, Thailand	Decision	5	3:00
2001-08-31	Win	(Thailand) Charlie Sor.Chaitamil	Lumpinee Stadium	Bangkok, Thailand	Decision	5	3:00
2001-08-10	Win	(Thailand) Fahsuchon Sit-O	Lumpinee Stadium	Bangkok, Thailand	Decision	5	3:00
2001-06-23	Loss	(Thailand) Watcharachai Kaewsamrit	Lumpinee Stadium	Bangkok, Thailand	Decision	5	3:00
2001-05-25	Loss	(Thailand) Watcharachai Kaewsamrit	Lumpinee Stadium	Bangkok, Thailand	Decision	5	3:00
2001-03-27	Win	(Thailand) Ngathao Attharungroj	Lumpinee Stadium	Bangkok, Thailand	Decision	5	3:00
Wins the 1 million baht side-bet.
2001-02-27	Draw	(Thailand) Khajongkai Por.Burapha	Lumpinee Stadium	Bangkok, Thailand	Decision	5	3:00
2001-01-19	Loss	(Thailand) Nungubon Sitlerchai	Lumpinee Stadium	Bangkok, Thailand	Decision	5	3:00
2000-12-08	Win	(Thailand) Duhao KongUdom	Lumpinee Stadium	Bangkok, Thailand	Decision	5	3:00
2000-11-17	Win	(Thailand) Nontachai Sit-O	Lumpinee Stadium	Bangkok, Thailand	Decision	5	3:00
Wins the Lumpinee Stadium and Thailand 122 lbs titles.
2000-10-24	Win	Thailand Pinsinchai	Lumpinee Stadium	Bangkok, Thailand	Decision	5	3:00
2000-09-19	Win	(Thailand) Ekasit Sitkriangkrai	Lumpinee Stadium	Bangkok, Thailand	Decision	5	3:00
2000-08-29	Win	(Thailand) Newsancherng Pinsinchai	Lumpinee Stadium	Bangkok, Thailand	Decision	5	3:00
2000-06-23	Loss	(Thailand) Watcharachai Kaewsamrit	Lumpinee Stadium	Bangkok, Thailand	Decision	5	3:00
2000-05-23	Win	Thailand Pinsinchai	Lumpinee Stadium	Bangkok, Thailand	Decision	5	3:00
2000-01-18	Loss	(Thailand) Rungrawee Sor.Ploenchit	Lumpinee Stadium	Bangkok, Thailand	Decision	5	3:00
1999-11-26	Win	(Thailand) Kangwanlek Sit Kru Od	Lumpinee Stadium	Bangkok, Thailand	Decision	5	3:00
1999-10-26	Win	(Thailand) Kitti Sakornphithak	Lumpinee Stadium	Bangkok, Thailand	KO	3	
1999-09-07	Win	(Thailand) Kangwanlek Sit Kru Od	Lumpinee Stadium	Bangkok, Thailand	Decision	5	3:00
1999-08-03	Draw	(Thailand) Kangwanlek Sit Kru Od	Lumpinee Stadium	Bangkok, Thailand	Decision	5	3:00
1999-06-25	Win	(Thailand) Rungrawee Sor.Ploenchit	Lumpinee Stadium	Bangkok, Thailand	(Rungrawee dismissed)	5	
1999-05-21	Win	(Thailand) Chatri Sitpafa	Lumpinee Stadium	Bangkok, Thailand	Decision	5	3:00
1999-03-30	Win	(Thailand) Lerdsila Chumpairtour	Lumpinee Stadium	Bangkok, Thailand	Decision	5	3:00
1999-03-12	Win	(Thailand) Rungrawee Sor.Ploenchit	Lumpinee Stadium	Bangkok, Thailand	Decision	5	3:00
1999-	Win	(Thailand) Rungrawee Sor.Ploenchit	Lumpinee Stadium	Bangkok, Thailand	Decision	5	3:00
1997-05-22	Win	(Thailand) Denphayak Chor.Jaroen	Lumpinee Stadium	Bangkok, Thailand	Decision	5	3:00
Legend: Win Loss Draw/No contest Notes
