= Men's Full-Contact at W.A.K.O. European Championships 2004 Budva -91 kg =

Men's Full-Contact Kickboxing at the W.A.K.O. European Championships 2004 (Budva)
-51 kg
-54 kg
-57 kg
-60 kg
-63 kg
-67 kg
-71 kg
-75 kg
-81 kg
-86 kg
-91 kg
+91 kg

The men's heavyweight (91 kg/200.2 lbs) Full-Contact category at the W.A.K.O. European Championships 2004 in Budva was the second heaviest of the male Full-Contact tournaments and involved just five participants. Each of the matches was three rounds of two minutes each and were fought under Full-Contact kickboxing rules.

As there were not enough fighters for a tournament designed for eight, three of the participants had a bye through to the semi-finals. The gold medal winner was amateur boxing champion Milorad Gajović from hosts Serbia and Montenegro who defeated Russia's Anatoly Nossyrev in the final by majority decision. Defeated semi finalists, Balazs Varga from Hungary and Andreas Hampel from Germany had to make do with bronze medals.

== Results ==
Quarter-finals
(Hungary) Balazs Varga	D(3:0)
(Croatia) Damir Tovarovic

Semi-finals
(Hungary) Balazs Varga
(Serbia and Montenegro) Milorad Gajović	D(3:0)
(Russia) Anatoly Nossyrev	D(3:0)
(Germany) Andreas Hampel

Final
(Serbia and Montenegro) Milorad Gajović	D(4:1)
(Russia) Anatoly Nossyrev

=== Key ===
Abbreviation	Meaning
D (2:1)	Decision (Winners Score:Losers Score)
WIN	KO or Walkover - official source unclear

== See also ==
- List of WAKO Amateur European Championships
- List of WAKO Amateur World Championships
- List of male kickboxers
