= Men's Low-Kick at W.A.K.O. European Championships 2004 Budva -81 kg =

Men's Low-Kick Kickboxing at the W.A.K.O. European Championships 2004 (Budva)
-51 kg
-54 kg
-57 kg
-60 kg
-63 kg
-67 kg
-71 kg
-75 kg
-81 kg
-86 kg
-91 kg
+91 kg

The men's light heavyweight (81 kg/178.2 lbs) Low-Kick division at the W.A.K.O. European Championships 2004 in Budva was the fourth heaviest of the male Low-Kick tournaments and involved nine fighters. Each of the matches was three rounds of two minutes each and were fought under Low-Kick kickboxing rules.

As there were too few fighters for a tournament designed for sixteen, seven of the men had a bye through to the quarter-finals. The gold medal was won by Drazenko Ninic from Bosnia and Herzegovina who defeated Mikhail Chalykn from Russia in the final by split decision. The bronze medal positions were taken by Teppo Laine from Finland and Hungarian Dénes Racz.

== Results ==
These matches ended in a split decision.

1st round
(Poland) Petertil Rafal	3
(Iran) Rouzbeh Langroudi	0

Quarter-finals
(Bosnia and Herzegovina) Drazenko Ninic	3
(Poland) Rafal Petertil	0
(Finland) Teppo Laine	3
(Sweden) Jim Johansson	0
(Belarus) Siarhei Karmazin	0
(Russia) Mikhail Chalykn	3
(Bulgaria) Georgi Georgiev	0
(Hungary) Dénes Racz	3

Semi-finals
(Bosnia and Herzegovina) Drazenko Ninic	3
(Finland) Teppo Laine	0
(Russia) Mikhail Chalykn	3
(Hungary) Dénes Racz	0

Final
(Bosnia and Herzegovina) Drazenko Ninic	3
(Russia) Mikhail Chalykn	2

== See also ==
- List of WAKO Amateur European Championships
- List of WAKO Amateur World Championships
- List of male kickboxers
