= Women's Full-Contact at W.A.K.O. European Championships 2004 Budva -48 kg =

Women's Full-Contact Kickboxing at the W.A.K.O. European Championships 2004 (Budva)
-48 kg
-52 kg
-56 kg
-60 kg
-65 kg
-70 kg
+70 kg

The women's bantamweight (48 kg/105.6 lbs) Full-Contact category at the W.A.K.O. European Championships 2004 in Budva was the lightest of the female Full-Contact tournaments and involved just five fighters. Each of the matches was three rounds of two minutes each and were fought under Full-Contact kickboxing rules.

As there were too few women for a tournament designed for eight, three of the ladies received byes through to the semi-finals. The tournament winner was Olesya Gladkova from Russia who defeated Veronique Legras of France by unanimous decision to claim the gold medal, in what was a repeat of the 2003 world championships final. Jenny Hardengz from Sweden and Annika Pitkänen from Finland won bronze.

== Results ==
Quarter-finals
(Italy) Paola Torrente
(Sweden) Jenny Hardengz	D(2:1)

Semi-finals
(Russia) Olesya Gladkova	D(3:0)
(Sweden) Jenny Hardengz
(Finland) Annika Pitkänen
(France) Veronique Legras	D(3:0)

Final
(Russia) Olesya Gladkova	D(3:0)
(France) Veronique Legras

=== Key ===
Abbreviation	Meaning
D (2:1)	Decision (Winners Score:Losers Score)
WIN	KO or Walkover - official source unclear

== See also ==
- List of WAKO Amateur European Championships
- List of WAKO Amateur World Championships
- List of female kickboxers
