= Women's Full-Contact at W.A.K.O. European Championships 2004 Budva -52 kg =

Women's Full-Contact Kickboxing at the W.A.K.O. European Championships 2004 (Budva)
-48 kg
-52 kg
-56 kg
-60 kg
-65 kg
-70 kg
+70 kg

The women's lightweight (52 kg/114.4 lbs) Full-Contact category at the W.A.K.O. European Championships 2004 in Budva was the second lightest of the female Full-Contact tournaments and involved eight fighters. Each of the matches was three rounds of two minutes each and were fought under Full-Contact kickboxing rules.

The tournament gold medallist was Mette Solli from Norway who defeated Germany's Fatma Akyüz in the final by unanimous decision, with the unlucky Akyüz claiming her fourth silver medal in a row at a W.A.K.O. championships. Lidia Andreeva and Tatiana Rinaldi from Russia and Italy received bronze medals.

== Results ==
Quarter Finals
(Germany) Fatma Akyüz	D(3:0)
(Italy) Ivona Roca
(Russia) Lidia Andreeva	D(3:0)
(Poland) Julita Tkaczyk
(Italy) Tatiana Rinaldi	D(2:1)
(Finland) Hanne Mäkinen
(Bulgaria) Monika Petrova
(Norway) Mette Solli	D(2:1)

Semi Finals
(Germany) Fatma Akyüz	D(2:1)
(Russia) Lidia Andreeva
(Italy) Tatiana Rinaldi
(Norway) Mette Solli	D(3:0)

Final
(Germany) Fatma Akyüz
(Norway) Mette Solli	D(3:0)

=== Key ===
Abbreviation	Meaning
D (2:1)	Decision (Winners Score:Losers Score)
WIN	KO or Walkover - official source unclear

== See also ==
- List of WAKO Amateur European Championships
- List of WAKO Amateur World Championships
- List of female kickboxers
