= Men's Full-Contact at W.A.K.O. European Championships 2004 Budva -60 kg =

Men's Full-Contact Kickboxing at the W.A.K.O. European Championships 2004 (Budva)
-51 kg
-54 kg
-57 kg
-60 kg
-63 kg
-67 kg
-71 kg
-75 kg
-81 kg
-86 kg
-91 kg
+91 kg

The men's lightweight (60 kg/132 lbs) Full-Contact category at the W.A.K.O. European Championships 2004 in Budva was the fourth lightest of the male Full-Contact tournaments and involved seven contestants. Each of the matches was three rounds of two minutes each and were fought under Full-Contact kickboxing rules.

As there was not being enough participants for a tournament of eight, one of the fighters received a bye through to the semi-finals. The lightweight gold medallist was Daniel Martins from France who defeated Germany's Mike List. Defeated semi finalists Galic Predrag from hosts Serbia and Montenegro and Damian Ławniczak from Poland won bronze.

== Results ==
Quarter-finals
(Serbia and Montenegro) Galic Predrag	D(2:1)
(Hungary) Csaba Toth
(Bulgaria) Zlatomir Dimitrov
(Germany) Mike List	D(3:0)
(France) Daniel Martins	D(2:1)
(Russia) Marat Egiyan

Semi-finals
(Serbia and Montenegro) Galic Predrag
(Germany) Mike List	D(2:1)
(France) Daniel Martins	D(3:0)
(Poland) Damian Ławniczak

Final
(Germany) Mike List
(France) Daniel Martins	D(3:0)

=== Key ===
Abbreviation	Meaning
D (2:1)	Decision (Winners Score:Losers Score)
WIN	KO or Walkover - official source unclear

== See also ==
- List of WAKO Amateur European Championships
- List of WAKO Amateur World Championships
- List of male kickboxers
