= Men's Low-Kick at W.A.K.O. European Championships 2004 Budva -86 kg =

Men's Low-Kick Kickboxing at the W.A.K.O. European Championships 2004 (Budva)
-51 kg
-54 kg
-57 kg
-60 kg
-63 kg
-67 kg
-71 kg
-75 kg
-81 kg
-86 kg
-91 kg
+91 kg

The men's cruiserweight (86 kg/189.2 lbs) Low-Kick division at the W.A.K.O. European Championships 2004 in Budva was the third heaviest of the male Low-Kick tournaments and involved just six fighters. Each of the matches was three rounds of two minutes each and were fought under Low-Kick kickboxing rules.

Due to the fact there were too few fighters for a tournament fit for eight, two of the participants received a bye through to the semi-finals. Goran Radović from Serbia and Montenegro won gold by defeating Russia's Alexandr Poydunov in the final by split decision. Defeated semi finalists Umberto Lucci and Yurij Aorohin from Italy and Moldova respectively, won bronze medals.

== Results ==
These matches ended in a split decision.

Quarter-finals		Semi-finals		Final
		(Italy) Umberto Lucci	0
(Russia) Alexandr Poydunov	3	(Russia) Alexandr Poydunov	3
(Bosnia and Herzegovina) Bojan Glavas	0			(Russia) Alexandr Poydunov	2
(Moldova) Yurij Aorohin	3			(Serbia and Montenegro) Goran Radović	3
(Croatia) Ivica Ivic	0	(Moldova) Yurij Aorohin	1
		(Serbia and Montenegro) Goran Radović	2

== See also ==
- List of WAKO Amateur European Championships
- List of WAKO Amateur World Championships
- List of male kickboxers
