= Women's Low-Kick at W.A.K.O European Championships 2004 Budva -60 kg =

Women's Low-Kick Kickboxing at the W.A.K.O. European Championships 2004 (Budva)
-48 kg
-52 kg
-56 kg
-60 kg
-65 kg
-70 kg

The women's middleweight (60 kg/132 lbs) Low-Kick division at the W.A.K.O. European Championships 2004 in Budva was the third heaviest of the female Low-Kick tournaments and also the smallest involving just two fighters. Each of the matches was three rounds of two minutes each and were fought under Low-Kick kickboxing rules.

As there were only two women both contestants went straight into the final. The tournament gold medallist was Julia Nemtsova from Russia who defeated Sanja Ilic from Serbia and Montenegro by unanimous decision. Nemtsova had previously won a silver in Full-Contact at the last world championships in Paris.

== Results ==
Semi Finals	Final
	(Serbia and Montenegro) Sanja Ilic
	(Russia) Julia Nemtsova	D(3:0)

=== Key ===
Abbreviation	Meaning
D (2:1)	Decision (Winners Score:Losers Score)
WIN	KO or Walkover - official source unclear

== See also ==
- List of WAKO Amateur European Championships
- List of WAKO Amateur World Championships
- List of female kickboxers
