= Men's Full-Contact at W.A.K.O. European Championships 2004 Budva -81 kg =

Men's Full-Contact Kickboxing at the W.A.K.O. European Championships 2004 (Budva)
-51 kg
-54 kg
-57 kg
-60 kg
-63 kg
-67 kg
-71 kg
-75 kg
-81 kg
-86 kg
-91 kg
+91 kg

The men's light heavyweight (81 kg/178.2 lbs) Full-Contact category at the W.A.K.O. European Championships 2004 in Budva was the fourth heaviest of the male Full-Contact tournaments and involved eight participants. Each of the matches was three rounds of two minutes each and were fought under Full-Contact kickboxing rules.

The tournament gold medallist was Maxim Voronov from Russia who defeated Pole Bogumil Polonski in the final by unanimous decision in what would be a European and world double for Voronov who also won at the last W.A.K.O. world championships. Hannes Perk and Patrik Sjöstrand, from Estonia and Sweden respectively, took the bronze medal positions.

== Results ==
Quarter Finals
(Russia) Maxim Voronov	D(3:0)
(Italy) Alessandro Spinelli
(Estonia) Hannes Perk	D(2:1)
(Germany) Markus Rauch
(Serbia and Montenegro) Slobodan Popov
(Sweden) Patrik Sjöstrand	D(3:0)
(Poland) Bogumil Polonski	D(3:0)
(Belarus) Svetlozar Radev

Semi Finals
(Russia) Maxim Voronov	D(3:0)
(Estonia) Hannes Perk
(Sweden) Patrik Sjöstrand
(Poland) Bogumil Polonski	D(3:0)

Final
(Russia) Maxim Voronov	D(3:0)
(Poland) Bogumil Polonski

=== Key ===
Abbreviation	Meaning
D (2:1)	Decision (Winners Score:Losers Score)
WIN	KO or Walkover - official source unclear

== See also ==
- List of WAKO Amateur European Championships
- List of WAKO Amateur World Championships
- List of male kickboxers
