= Men's Low-Kick at W.A.K.O. European Championships 2004 Budva -60 kg =

Men's Low-Kick Kickboxing at the W.A.K.O. European Championships 2004 (Budva)
-51 kg
-54 kg
-57 kg
-60 kg
-63 kg
-67 kg
-71 kg
-75 kg
-81 kg
-86 kg
-91 kg
+91 kg

The men's lightweight (60 kg/118.8 lbs) Low-Kick division at the W.A.K.O. European Championships 2004 in Budva was the fourth lightest of the male Low-Kick tournaments and involved just four fighters. Each of the matches was three rounds of two minutes each and were fought under Low-Kick kickboxing rules.

The tournament champion was Artur Tozliyan from Russia who defeated Poland's Michal Tomczykowski in the final by unanimous decision to win gold. The tournaments only two other fighters, Bulgarian Tihomir Iliev and Italian Mario Donnarumma, won bronze medals.

== Results ==
These matches ended in a unanimous decision.

Semi Finals
(Bulgaria) Tihomir Iliev	0
(Russia) Artur Tozliyan	3
(Poland) Michal Tomczykowski	3
(Italy) Mario Donnarumma	0

Final
(Russia) Artur Tozliyan	3
(Poland) Michal Tomczykowski	0

== See also ==
- List of WAKO Amateur European Championships
- List of WAKO Amateur World Championships
- List of male kickboxers
