= Women's Full-Contact at W.A.K.O European Championships 2004 Budva +70 kg =

Women's Full-Contact Kickboxing at the W.A.K.O. European Championships 2004 (Budva)
-48 kg
-52 kg
-56 kg
-60 kg
-65 kg
-70 kg
+70 kg

The women's super heavyweight (+70 kg/154 lbs) Full-Contact category at the W.A.K.O. European Championships 2004 in Budva was the heaviest of the female Full-Contact tournaments but was also the smallest involving just three fighters. Each of the matches was three rounds of two minutes each and were fought under Full-Contact kickboxing rules.

The gold medal was won by Galina Ivanova from Russia who defeated Daniela Lazzareska from Macedonia in the final by unanimous decision. The only other contestant in the tournament, Sweden's Caroline Ek, won bronze.

== Results ==
Semi Finals		Final
		(North Macedonia) Daniela Lazzareska
(Russia) Galina Ivanova	D(3:0)	(Russia) Galina Ivanova	D(3:0)
(Sweden) Caroline Ek

=== Key ===
Abbreviation	Meaning
D (2:1)	Decision (Winners Score:Losers Score)
WIN	KO or Walkover - official source unclear

== See also ==
- List of WAKO Amateur European Championships
- List of WAKO Amateur World Championships
- List of female kickboxers
