= Men's Low-Kick at W.A.K.O. European Championships 2004 Budva -91 kg =

Men's Low-Kick Kickboxing at the W.A.K.O. European Championships 2004 (Budva)
-51 kg
-54 kg
-57 kg
-60 kg
-63 kg
-67 kg
-71 kg
-75 kg
-81 kg
-86 kg
-91 kg
+91 kg

The men's heavyweight (91 kg/200.2 lbs) Low-Kick division at the W.A.K.O. European Championships 2004 in Budva was the second heaviest of the male Low-Kick tournaments and was one of the smallest involving only three fighters. Each of the matches was three rounds of two minutes each and were fought under Low-Kick kickboxing rules.

As there were too few fighters for a tournament designed for four, one of the contestants had a bye straight through to the final. The gold medal match was won by Serbia and Montenegro's Dejan Milosavljevic who added to the gold medal he had won at the last European championships in Jesolo by defeating Russian Anatoly Borozna in the final by unanimous decision. The tournaments only other competitor, Kresimir Marasovic from Croatia, received a bronze medal.

== Results ==
These matches ended in a unanimous decision.

Semi Finals		Final
		(Russia) Anatoly Borozna	0
(Croatia) Kresimir Marasovic	0	(Serbia and Montenegro) Dejan Milosavljevic	3
(Serbia and Montenegro) Dejan Milosavljevic	3

== See also ==
- List of WAKO Amateur European Championships
- List of WAKO Amateur World Championships
- List of male kickboxers
