= Men's Full-Contact at W.A.K.O. European Championships 2004 Budva -57 kg =

| Men's Full-Contact Kickboxing at the W.A.K.O. European Championships 2004 (Budva) |
|---|
| -51 kg |
| -54 kg |
| -57 kg |
| -60 kg |
| -63 kg |
| -67 kg |
| -71 kg |
| -75 kg |
| -81 kg |
| -86 kg |
| -91 kg |
| +91 kg |

The men's featherweight (57 kg/125.4 lbs) Full-Contact category at the W.A.K.O. European Championships 2004 in Budva was the third lightest of the male Full-Contact tournaments and involved seven fighters. Each of the matches was three rounds of two minutes each and were fought under Full-Contact kickboxing rules.

Due to there not being enough participants for a tournament of eight, one of the contestants got a bye through to the semi-finals. By the end of the championships Frenchman Lucien Gross was the gold medallist defeating Russian Boris Klimenko in the final by unanimous decision. Defeated semi finalists Maurycy Gojko from Poland and Damir Dorts from Belarus were given bronze medals for their efforts.

== Results ==
Quarter-finals
(Bulgaria) Peter Velin
(Poland) Maurycy Gojko | D(3:0)
(France) Lucien Gross | D(3:0)
(Portugal) Francisco Fernandes
(Hungary) Kornel Sandor
(Belarus) Damir Dorts | D(3:0)

Semi-finals
(Russia) Boris Klimenko | D(3:0)
(Poland) Maurycy Gojko
(France) Lucien Gross | D(3:0)
(Belarus) Damir Dorts

Final
(Russia) Boris Klimenko
(France) Lucien Gross | D(3:0)

=== Key ===
| Abbreviation | Meaning |
|---|---|
| D (2:1) | Decision (Winners Score:Losers Score) |

== See also ==
- List of WAKO Amateur European Championships
- List of WAKO Amateur World Championships
- List of male kickboxers
