= Men's Low-Kick at W.A.K.O. European Championships 2004 Budva -51 kg =

Men's Low-Kick Kickboxing at the W.A.K.O. European Championships 2004 (Budva)
-51 kg
-54 kg
-57 kg
-60 kg
-63 kg
-67 kg
-71 kg
-75 kg
-81 kg
-86 kg
-91 kg
+91 kg

The men's light bantamweight (51 kg/112.2 lbs) Low-Kick division at the W.A.K.O. European Championships 2004 in Budva was the lightest of the male Low-Kick tournaments and was one of the smallest involving just three fighters. Each of the matches was three rounds of two minutes each and were fought under Low-Kick kickboxing rules.

As there was too few fighters for a tournament designed for four, one of the contestants received a bye through to the final. The tournament gold medallist was Russia's Ivan Bityutskikh who defeated Maksim Tulai from Belarus by unanimous decision. The bronze medal position went to the only other participant, Ante Juricev Sudac from Croatia.

== Results ==
Semi Finals		Final
		(Russia) Ivan Bityutskikh	D(3:0)
(Croatia) Ante Juricev Sudac		(Belarus) Maksim Tulai
(Belarus) Maksim Tulai	WIN

=== Key ===
Abbreviation	Meaning
D (2:1)	Decision (Winners Score:Losers Score)
WIN	KO or Walkover - official source unclear

== See also ==
- List of WAKO Amateur European Championships
- List of WAKO Amateur World Championships
- List of male kickboxers
