= Women's Low-Kick at W.A.K.O European Championships 2004 Budva -56 kg =

Women's Low-Kick Kickboxing at the W.A.K.O. European Championships 2004 (Budva)
-48 kg
-52 kg
-56 kg
-60 kg
-65 kg
-70 kg

The women's lightweight (56 kg/123.2 lbs) Low-Kick division at the W.A.K.O. European Championships 2004 in Budva was the third lightest of the female Low-Kick tournaments and involved only three fighters. Each of the matches was three rounds of two minutes each and were fought under Low-Kick kickboxing rules.

As there were not enough participants for a tournament designed for four, one of the contestants received a bye through to the final. The tournament gold medallist was Italy's Barbara Plazzoli who added to the silver medal she won in Full-Contact at the last world championships in Paris, by defeating Serbia and Montenegro's Goranka Blagojevic by majority decision. The tournaments last fighter, Tereze Lindberg from Sweden, won bronze.

== Results ==
Semi Finals		Final
(Serbia and Montenegro) Goranka Blagojevic	D(3:0)
(Sweden) Tereze Lindberg		(Serbia and Montenegro) Goranka Blagojevic
		(Italy) Barbara Plazzoli	D(5:1)

=== Key ===
Abbreviation	Meaning
D (2:1)	Decision (Winners Score:Losers Score)
WIN	KO or Walkover - official source unclear

== See also ==
- List of WAKO Amateur European Championships
- List of WAKO Amateur World Championships
- List of female kickboxers
