= Men's Low-Kick at W.A.K.O. European Championships 2004 Budva -57 kg =

Men's Low-Kick Kickboxing at the W.A.K.O. European Championships 2004 (Budva)
-51 kg
-54 kg
-57 kg
-60 kg
-63 kg
-67 kg
-71 kg
-75 kg
-81 kg
-86 kg
-91 kg
+91 kg

The men's featherweight (57 kg/125.4 lbs) Low-Kick division at the W.A.K.O. European Championships 2004 in Budva was the third lightest of the male Low-Kick tournaments and involved just four fighters. Each of the matches was three rounds of two minutes each and were fought under Low-Kick kickboxing rules.

The tournament winner was Ruslan Tozliyan from Russia who defeated Pole Mariusz Cieśliński in the final by unanimous decision. The tournaments two other fighters, Milos Ahic from Serbia and Montenegro and Gabor Kiss from Hungary, gained bronze medals.

== Results ==
These matches ended in a unanimous decision.

Semi Finals
(Russia) Ruslan Tozliyan	3
(Serbia and Montenegro) Milos Ahic	0
(Hungary) Gabor Kiss	0
(Poland) Mariusz Cieśliński	3

Final
(Russia) Ruslan Tozliyan	3
(Poland) Mariusz Cieśliński	0

== See also ==
- List of WAKO Amateur European Championships
- List of WAKO Amateur World Championships
- List of male kickboxers
