= Women's Low-Kick at W.A.K.O European Championships 2004 Budva -48 kg =

Women's Low-Kick Kickboxing at the W.A.K.O. European Championships 2004 (Budva)
-48 kg
-52 kg
-56 kg
-60 kg
-65 kg
-70 kg

The women's bantamweight (48 kg/105.6 lbs) Low-Kick division at the W.A.K.O. European Championships 2004 in Budva was the lightest of the female Low-Kick tournaments and involved just three fighters. Each of the matches was three rounds of two minutes each and were fought under Low-Kick kickboxing rules.

As there were too few fighters for a tournament designed for four, one of the women had a bye straight through to the final. The tournament winner was Raisa Akulova from Russia who defeated Dragana Zanini from host nation Serbia and Montenegro by unanimous decision in the gold medal match. The events only other fighter, Nikolett Simon from Hungary received the bronze medal.

== Results ==
Semi Finals		Final
(Hungary) Nikolett Simon
(Serbia and Montenegro) Dragana Zanini	D(2:1)	(Serbia and Montenegro) Dragana Zanini
		(Russia) Raisa Akulova	D(3:0)

=== Key ===
Abbreviation	Meaning
D (2:1)	Decision (Winners Score:Losers Score)
WIN	KO or Walkover - official source unclear

== See also ==
- List of WAKO Amateur European Championships
- List of WAKO Amateur World Championships
- List of female kickboxers
