= Men's Low-Kick at W.A.K.O. European Championships 2004 Budva -63 kg =

Men's Low-Kick Kickboxing at the W.A.K.O. European Championships 2004 (Budva)
-51 kg
-54 kg
-57 kg
-60 kg
-63 kg
-67 kg
-71 kg
-75 kg
-81 kg
-86 kg
-91 kg
+91 kg

The men's light welterweight (63 kg/138.6 lbs) Low-Kick division at the W.A.K.O. European Championships 2004 in Budva was the fifth lightest of the male Low-Kick tournaments and involved only four fighters. Each of the matches was three rounds of two minutes each and were fought under Low-Kick kickboxing rules.

The tournament gold medallist was Gosan Ibragimov from Russia who defeated Milan Dragojlovic from Serbia and Montenegro in the final by unanimous decision. Defeated semi finalists Soki Andros from Hungary and Toma Tomov from Bulgaria won bronze medals.

== Results ==
These matches ended in a unanimous decision.

Semi Finals
(Hungary) Soki Andros	0
(Russia) Gosan Ibragimov	3
(Bulgaria) Toma Tomov	0
(Serbia and Montenegro) Milan Dragojlovic	3

Final
(Russia) Gosan Ibragimov	3
(Serbia and Montenegro) Milan Dragojlovic	0

== See also ==
- List of WAKO Amateur European Championships
- List of WAKO Amateur World Championships
- List of male kickboxers
