= Men's Full-Contact at W.A.K.O. European Championships 2004 Budva -75 kg =

Men's Full-Contact Kickboxing at the W.A.K.O. European Championships 2004 (Budva)
-51 kg
-54 kg
-57 kg
-60 kg
-63 kg
-67 kg
-71 kg
-75 kg
-81 kg
-86 kg
-91 kg
+91 kg

The men's middleweight (75 kg/165 lbs) Full-Contact category at the W.A.K.O. European Championships 2004 in Budva was the fifth heaviest of the male Full-Contact tournaments and involved ten participants. Each of the matches was three rounds of two minutes each and were fought under Full-Contact kickboxing rules.

As there were too few men for a tournament designed for sixteen, eight of the fighters received byes into the quarter-finals. The tournament winner was the Russian Belooussov Konstantine who defeated Markus Hakulinen from Finland in the gold medal match by unanimous decision. Martin Milov from Bulgaria and Germany's Frank Witte were awarded bronze medals.

== Results ==
1st round
(France) Frédéric Gargani	D(3:0)
(Serbia and Montenegro) Petar Knežević

Quarter-finals
(Russia) Belooussov Konstantine	D(3:0)
(France) Frédéric Gargani
(Bulgaria) Martin Milov	D(3:0)
(Bosnia and Herzegovina) Edis Baždarević
(Germany) Frank Witte	D(2:1)
(Norway) Trond Stanghelle
(Italy) Mauro Nerone
(Finland) Markus Hakulinen	WIN

Semi-finals
(Russia) Belooussov Konstantine	D(3:0)
(Bulgaria) Martin Milov
(Germany) Frank Witte
(Finland) Markus Hakulinen	D(3:0)

Final
(Russia) Belooussov Konstantine	D(3:0)
(Finland) Markus Hakulinen

=== Key ===
Abbreviation	Meaning
D (2:1)	Decision (Winners Score:Losers Score)
WIN	KO or Walkover - official source unclear

== See also ==
- List of WAKO Amateur European Championships
- List of WAKO Amateur World Championships
- List of male kickboxers
