= Men's Low-Kick at W.A.K.O. European Championships 2004 Budva -75 kg =

Men's Low-Kick Kickboxing at the W.A.K.O. European Championships 2004 (Budva)
-51 kg
-54 kg
-57 kg
-60 kg
-63 kg
-67 kg
-71 kg
-75 kg
-81 kg
-86 kg
-91 kg
+91 kg

The men's middleweight (75 kg/165 lbs) Low-Kick division at the W.A.K.O. European Championships 2004 in Budva was the fifth heaviest of the male Low-Kick tournaments and involved eight fighters. Each of the matches was three rounds of two minutes each and were fought under Low-Kick kickboxing rules.

The tournament was won by Russia's Dmitri Krasichkov who defeated France's Fouad Ezbiri in the gold medal match by split decision. Stefano Paone from Italy and Vesko Dukic from hosts Serbia and Montenegro were rewarded for making the semi-finals by gaining bronze medals.

== Results ==
Quarter-finals
(Russia) Dmitri Krasichkov	WIN
(Belarus) Aliaksandr Svitin
(Bosnia and Herzegovina) Dejan Krneta
(Italy) Stefano Paone	WIN
(Hungary) Panak Akos
(France) Fouad Ezbiri	D(3:0)
(Serbia and Montenegro) Vesko Dukic	D(2:1)
(Iran) Ali Khanjari

Semi-finals
(Russia) Dmitri Krasichkov	D(3:0)
(Italy) Stefano Paone
(France) Fouad Ezbiri	D(3:0)
(Serbia and Montenegro) Vesko Dukic

Final
(Russia) Dmitri Krasichkov	D(2:1)
(France) Fouad Ezbiri

=== Key ===
Abbreviation	Meaning
D (2:1)	Decision (Winners Score:Losers Score)
WIN	KO or Walkover - official source unclear

== See also ==
- List of WAKO Amateur European Championships
- List of WAKO Amateur World Championships
- List of male kickboxers
