= Men's Full-Contact at W.A.K.O. European Championships 2004 Budva +91 kg =

Men's Full-Contact Kickboxing at the W.A.K.O. European Championships 2004 (Budva)
-51 kg
-54 kg
-57 kg
-60 kg
-63 kg
-67 kg
-71 kg
-75 kg
-81 kg
-86 kg
-91 kg
+91 kg

The men's super heavyweight (+91 kg/200.2 lbs) Full-Contact category at the W.A.K.O. European Championships 2004 in Budva was the heaviest of the male Full-Contact tournaments and involved just six participants. Each of the matches was three rounds of two minutes each and were fought under Full-Contact kickboxing rules.

As there were too few participants for a tournament for eight, two of the fighters had a bye through to the semi-finals. Duško Basrak from Serbia and Montenegro was the gold medallist defeating Poland's Michal Wszelak (who had won a silver in Light-Contact at the last W.A.K.O. world championships) in the final by unanimous decision. Defeated semi-finalists Mikhail Shvoev from Russia and Jukka Saarinen from Finland won bronze.

== Results ==
Quarter-finals		Semi-finals		Final
		(Serbia and Montenegro) Duško Basrak	D(3:0)
(Slovenia) Elvis Trepic		(Russia) Mikhail Shvoev
(Russia) Mikhail Shvoev	D(2:1)			(Serbia and Montenegro) Duško Basrak	D(3:0)
(Bosnia and Herzegovina) Adnan Buharalija				(Poland) Michal Wszelak
(Poland) Michal Wszelak	D(3:0)	(Poland) Michal Wszelak	D(3:0)
		(Finland) Jukka Saarinen

=== Key ===
Abbreviation	Meaning
D (2:1)	Decision (Winners Score:Losers Score)
WIN	KO or Walkover - official source unclear

== See also ==
- List of WAKO Amateur European Championships
- List of WAKO Amateur World Championships
- List of male kickboxers
