= Men's Full-Contact at W.A.K.O. European Championships 2004 Budva -54 kg =

Men's Full-Contact Kickboxing at the W.A.K.O. European Championships 2004 (Budva)
-51 kg
-54 kg
-57 kg
-60 kg
-63 kg
-67 kg
-71 kg
-75 kg
-81 kg
-86 kg
-91 kg
+91 kg

The men's bantamweight (54 kg/118.8 lbs) Full-Contact category at the W.A.K.O. European Championships 2004 in Budva was the second lightest of the male Full-Contact tournaments, involving just four fighters. Each of the matches was three rounds of two minutes each and were fought under Full-Contact kickboxing rules.

By the end of the championship Zurab Faroyan from Russia won the gold medal against Pole Tomasz Makowski by unanimous decision after three rounds. Gabor Aburko from Hungary and Filip Exsan from Bulgaria won bronze medals.

== Results ==
Semi Finals
(Hungary) Gabor Aburko
(Russia) Zurab Faroyan	D(3:0)
(Bulgaria) Filip Exsan
(Poland) Tomasz Makowski	D(3:0)

Final
(Russia) Zurab Faroyan	D(3:0)
(Poland) Tomasz Makowski

=== Key ===
Abbreviation	Meaning
D (2:1)	Decision (Winners Score:Losers Score)
WIN	KO or Walkover - official source unclear

== See also ==
- List of WAKO Amateur European Championships
- List of WAKO Amateur World Championships
- List of male kickboxers
