= Men's Full-Contact at WAKO World Championships 2007 Coimbra -91 kg =

The men's heavyweight (91 kg/200.2 lbs) Full-Contact category at the W.A.K.O. World Championships 2007 in Coimbra was the second heaviest of the male Full-Contact tournaments involving fifteen fighters from four continents (Europe, Asia, North America and Oceania). Each of the matches was three rounds of two minutes each and were fought under Full-Contact rules.

Due to the fact there was one too few fighters for a tournament made for sixteen, one of the men had a bye through to the quarter-finals. The tournament gold medallist was the Russian Roman Beskishkov who defeated 2008 Olympic Games boxer Milorad Gajović from Montenegro in the final by split decision. The bronze medal positions went to Pole Bartlomiej Bocian (who had also won a bronze in the Light-Contact event at the world championship in Belgrade a month or so previously) and Denis Simkin from Ukraine.

== Results ==
1st round
(Austria) Patrick Gerdenitsch
(Poland) Bartlomiej Bocian	KO
(Hungary) Attila Boros	D(3:0)
(India) Umesh Talegaonkar
(Italy) Agostino Pavesi	DQ
(United Kingdom) Stephen Dossett
(Montenegro) Milorad Gajović	D(3:0)
(New Zealand) Carl Cowley
(Germany) Lukasz Makarewicz	D(3:0)
(Turkey) Seref Karakaş
(Russia) Roman Beskishkov	D(3:0)
(Latvia) Igors Goncarovs
(Croatia) Miroslav Šarac	D(2:1)
(United States) Neil Osten

Quarter-finals
(Poland) Bartlomiej Bocian	D(3:0)
(Hungary) Attila Boros
(Italy) Agostino Pavesi
(Montenegro) Milorad Gajović	KO
(Germany) Lukasz Makarewicz
(Russia) Roman Beskishkov	D(3:0)
(Croatia) Miroslav Šarac
(Ukraine) Denis Simkin	D(3:0)

Semi-finals
(Poland) Bartlomiej Bocian
(Montenegro) Milorad Gajović	D(2:1)
(Russia) Roman Beskishkov	D(2:1)
(Ukraine) Denis Simkin

Final
(Montenegro) Milorad Gajović
(Russia) Roman Beskishkov	D(2:1)

=== Key ===
Abbreviation	Meaning
D (3:0)	Decision (Unanimous)
D (2:1)	Decision (Split)
KO	Knockout
DQ	Disqualification

== See also ==
- List of WAKO Amateur World Championships
- List of WAKO Amateur European Championships
- List of male kickboxers
