= Men's Low-Kick at W.A.K.O. European Championships 2004 Budva -54 kg =

2004 Kickboxing Tournament

Men's Low-Kick Kickboxing at the W.A.K.O. European Championships 2004 (Budva)
-51 kg
-54 kg
-57 kg
-60 kg
-63 kg
-67 kg
-71 kg
-75 kg
-81 kg
-86 kg
-91 kg
+91 kg

The men's bantamweight (54 kg/118.8 lbs) Low-Kick division at the W.A.K.O. European Championships 2004 in Budva was the second lightest of the male Low-Kick tournaments and involved five fighters. Each of the matches was three rounds of two minutes each and were fought under Low-Kick kickboxing rules.

As there were too few fighters for a tournament designed for eight, three of the men received a bye through to the semi-finals. The gold medal was won by Alexander Sidorov from Moldova who defeated Russia's Ayup Arsaev in the final by unanimous decision. Defeated semi finalists Boban Marinkovic from Serbia and Montenegro and Dzmitry Baranau from Belarus received bronze medals.

== Results ==
These matches ended in a split decision.

Quarter-finals		Semi-finals		Final
		(Serbia and Montenegro) Boban Marinkovic	1
		(Russia) Ayup Arsaev	2
				(Russia) Ayup Arsaev	0
(Portugal) Fernando Machado	0			(Moldova) Alexander Sidorov	3
(Belarus) Dzmitry Baranau	3	(Belarus) Dzmitry Baranau	1
		(Moldova) Alexander Sidorov	2

== See also ==
- List of WAKO Amateur European Championships
- List of WAKO Amateur World Championships
- List of male kickboxers
