= Women's Full-Contact at W.A.K.O European Championships 2004 Budva -65 kg =

Women's Full-Contact Kickboxing at the W.A.K.O. European Championships 2004 (Budva)
-48 kg
-52 kg
-56 kg
-60 kg
-65 kg
-70 kg
+70 kg

The women's light heavyweight (65 kg/143 lbs) Full-Contact category at the W.A.K.O. European Championships 2004 in Budva was the fourth heaviest of the female Full-Contact tournaments and involved just four fighters. Each of the matches was three rounds of two minutes each and were fought under Full-Contact kickboxing rules.

The tournament champion was Russia's Maria Karlova who added to the gold she had won in Paris the previous year by defeating host nation Serbia and Montenegro's Marija Ristović in the final by unanimous decision. Defeated semi finalists Katalin Csehi from Hungary and Anne Katas from Finland gained bronze medals.

== Results ==
Semi Finals		Final
(Russia) Maria Karlova	WIN
(Hungary) Katalin Csehi		(Russia) Maria Karlova	D(3:0)
(Finland) Anne Katas		(Serbia and Montenegro) Marija Ristovic
(Serbia and Montenegro) Marija Ristovic	D(2:1)

=== Key ===
Abbreviation	Meaning
D (2:1)	Decision (Winners Score:Losers Score)
WIN	KO or Walkover - official source unclear

== See also ==
- List of WAKO Amateur European Championships
- List of WAKO Amateur World Championships
- List of female kickboxers
