= Women's Low-Kick at W.A.K.O European Championships 2004 Budva -52 kg =

Women's Low-Kick Kickboxing at the W.A.K.O. European Championships 2004 (Budva)
-48 kg
-52 kg
-56 kg
-60 kg
-65 kg
-70 kg

The women's lightweight (52 kg/114.4 lbs) Low-Kick division at the W.A.K.O. European Championships 2004 in Budva was the second lightest of the female Low-Kick tournaments and involved just three fighters. Each of the matches was three rounds of two minutes each and were fought under Low-Kick kickboxing rules.

As there were not enough contestants for a tournament designed for four, one of the women received a bye through to the final. The gold medal was won by Russian Maria Krivoshapkina who defeated Italian Rita De Angelis by split decision. Hungary's Reka Krempf picked up a bronze medal.

== Results ==
Semi Finals		Final
(Hungary) Reka Krempf
(Italy) Rita De Angelis	D(2:1)	(Italy) Rita De Angelis
		(Russia) Maria Krivoshapkina	D(2:1)

=== Key ===
Abbreviation	Meaning
D (2:1)	Decision (Winners Score:Losers Score)
WIN	KO or Walkover - official source unclear

== See also ==
- List of WAKO Amateur European Championships
- List of WAKO Amateur World Championships
- List of female kickboxers
