= Women's Thai-Boxing at W.A.K.O European Championships 2004 Budva -52 kg =

| Women's Thai-Boxing at the W.A.K.O. European Championships 2004 (Budva) |
|---|
| -52 kg |
| -65 kg |

The women's featherweight (52 kg/114.64lbs) Thai-Boxing division at the W.A.K.O. European Championships 2004 in Budva was the lightest of the female Thai-Boxing tournaments and involved only two fighters. Each of the matches was three rounds of two minutes each and were fought under Thai-Boxing rules.

As there were only two contestants both women went straight through to the final. The gold medal was won by the Russian Ekaterina Dumbrava who defeated host nation Serbia and Montenegro's Milena Dincic by unanimous decision.

== Results ==
| Semi Finals | Final |
| | (Russia) Ekaterina Dumbrava | D(3:0) |
| | (Serbia and Montenegro) Milena Dincic |

=== Key ===
| Abbreviation | Meaning |
|---|---|
| D (2:1) | Decision (Winners Score:Losers Score) |
| WIN | KO or Walkover - official source unclear |

== See also ==
- List of WAKO Amateur European Championships
- List of WAKO Amateur World Championships
- List of female kickboxers
