= Men's Low-Kick at W.A.K.O. European Championships 2004 Budva -67 kg =

Men's Low-Kick Kickboxing at the W.A.K.O. European Championships 2004 (Budva)
-51 kg
-54 kg
-57 kg
-60 kg
-63 kg
-67 kg
-71 kg
-75 kg
-81 kg
-86 kg
-91 kg
+91 kg

The men's welterweight (67 kg/147.4 lbs) Low-Kick division at the W.A.K.O. European Championships 2004 in Budva was the sixth lightest of the male Low-Kick tournaments and involved ten fighters. Each of the matches was three rounds of two minutes each and were fought under Low-Kick kickboxing rules.

The tournament gold medal went to Russia's Ibragim Tamazaev who defeated France's Vahid Roshani by unanimous decision. Roshani (who would later represent Iran) would have his silver medal stripped by W.A.K.O. due to an undisclosed issue. Defeated semi finalists Frand Seyed Morteza from Iran and Eldin Raonic from Bosnia and Herzegovina picked up bronze medals for their efforts.

== Results ==
These matches ended in a split decision.

1st Round
(Portugal) José Barrada	0
(Hungary) Robert Szöke	3
(Bulgaria) Venelin Yankov	3
(Belarus) Aliaksandr Berazouski	0

Quarter Finals
(Iran) Frand Seyed Morteza	3
(Hungary) Robert Szöke	0
(Russia) Ibragim Tamazaev	3
(Serbia and Montenegro) Goran Vuksanovic	0
(Bosnia and Herzegovina) Eldin Raonic	3
(Italy) Federico Fragale	0
(Bulgaria) Venelin Yankov	0
(France) Vahid Roshani	3

Semi Finals
(Iran) Frand Seyed Morteza	0
(Russia) Ibragim Tamazaev	3
(Bosnia and Herzegovina) Eldin Raonic	0
(France) Vahid Roshani	3

Final
(Russia) Ibragim Tamazaev	3
(France) Vahid Roshani

== See also ==
- List of WAKO Amateur European Championships
- List of WAKO Amateur World Championships
- List of male kickboxers
