= Women's Full-Contact at W.A.K.O European Championships 2004 Budva -56 kg =

Still pending

Women's Full-Contact Kickboxing at the W.A.K.O. European Championships 2004 (Budva)
-48 kg
-52 kg
-56 kg
-60 kg
-65 kg
-70 kg
+70 kg

The women's lightweight (56 kg/123.2 lbs) Full-Contact category at the W.A.K.O. European Championships 2004 in Budva was the third lightest of the female Full-Contact tournaments and involved seven fighters. Each of the matches was three rounds of two minutes each and were fought under Full-Contact kickboxing rules.

As there were too few participants for tournament designed for eight, one of the women had a bye through to the semi-finals. The gold medallist was Sveta Kulakova from Russia who defeated Hungarian Zsuzsanna Szuknai in the final by unanimous decision. Defeated semi finalists Finland's Jutta Nordberg and Germany's Natalie Kalinowski received bronze medals.

== Results ==
Quarter-finals
(Finland) Jutta Nordberg	D(3:0)
(Bulgaria) Radostina Valtceva
(Italy) Silvia Panzeri
(Germany) Natalie Kalinowski	D(2:1)
(Russia) Sveta Kulakova	D(3:0)
(Poland) Edyta Olewniczak

Semi-finals
(Hungary) Zsuzsanna Szuknai	D(2:1)
(Finland) Jutta Nordberg
(Germany) Natalie Kalinowski
(Russia) Sveta Kulakova	D(3:0)

Final
(Hungary) Zsuzsanna Szuknai
(Russia) Sveta Kulakova	D(3:0)

=== Key ===
Abbreviation	Meaning
D (2:1)	Decision (Winners Score:Losers Score)
WIN	KO or Walkover - official source unclear

== See also ==
- List of WAKO Amateur European Championships
- List of WAKO Amateur World Championships
- List of female kickboxers
