= Men's Full-Contact at W.A.K.O. European Championships 2004 Budva -63 kg =

Men's Full-Contact Kickboxing at the W.A.K.O. European Championships 2004 (Budva)
-51 kg
-54 kg
-57 kg
-60 kg
-63 kg
-67 kg
-71 kg
-75 kg
-81 kg
-86 kg
-91 kg
+91 kg

The men's light welterweight (63 kg/138.6 lbs) Full-Contact category at the W.A.K.O. European Championships 2004 in Budva was the fifth lightest of the male Full-Contact tournaments and involved thirteen participants. Each of the matches was three rounds of two minutes each and were fought under Full-Contact kickboxing rules.

As there were too few places for a tournament designed for sixteen, three of the fighters received byes through to the quarter-final stage. The light welterweight gold medal was won by France's Malik Mangouchi who defeated Russia's Vladimir Pykhtin by split decision. It was Malik's second gold at a W.A.K.O. championships with his previous winners medal coming at the 2001 championships in Belgrade. The bronze medal positions were taken by Robert Zytkiewicz and Biagio Tralli from Poland and Italy respectively.

== Results ==
1st round
(Greece) Kostas Petropoulos
(Russia) Vladimir Pykhtin	WIN
(Portugal) Bruno Torres	WIN
(North Macedonia) Endrit Delili
(Serbia and Montenegro) Radomir Radomirovic
(Poland) Robert Zytkiewicz	WIN
(Sweden) Thomas Karlsson	D(2:1)
(Germany) Markus Ritz
(Bulgaria) Angel Yankov
(France) Malik Mangouchi	WIN

Quarter-finals
(Russia) Vladimir Pykhtin	D(3:0)
(Portugal) Bruno Torres
(Poland) Robert Zytkiewicz	D(2:1)
(Finland) Toni Hämäläinen
(Sweden) Thomas Karlsson
(Italy) Biagio Tralli	D(3:0)
(France) Malik Mangouchi	D(3:0)
(Hungary) Zsolt Nagy

Semi-finals
(Russia) Vladimir Pykhtin	D(3:0)
(Poland) Robert Zytkiewicz
(Italy) Biagio Tralli
(France) Malik Mangouchi	D(3:0)

Final
(Russia) Vladimir Pykhtin
(France) Malik Mangouchi	D(2:1)

=== Key ===
Abbreviation	Meaning
D (2:1)	Decision (Winners Score:Losers Score)
WIN	KO or Walkover - official source unclear

== See also ==
- List of WAKO Amateur European Championships
- List of WAKO Amateur World Championships
- List of male kickboxers
