= Men's Full-Contact at W.A.K.O. European Championships 2004 Budva -71 kg =

| Men's Full-Contact Kickboxing at the W.A.K.O. European Championships 2004 (Budva) |
|---|
| -51 kg |
| -54 kg |
| -57 kg |
| -60 kg |
| -63 kg |
| -67 kg |
| -71 kg |
| -75 kg |
| -81 kg |
| -86 kg |
| -91 kg |
| +91 kg |

The men's light middleweight (71 kg/156.2 lbs) Full-Contact category at the W.A.K.O. European Championships 2004 in Budva was the sixth heaviest of the male Full-Contact tournaments and involved eight participants. Each of the matches was three rounds of two minutes each and were fought under Full-Contact kickboxing rules.

The competition was won by Russia's Igor Kulbaev who defeated Hungarian Robert Arvai in the final match by unanimous decision - making it Kulbaev's second gold in a row at a W.A.K.O. championships (he had won at the world championships in Paris the previous year). Defeated semi finalists Poland's Mariusz Ziętek and France's Ahmed Kouranfal won bronze medals.

== Results ==
Quarter Finals
(Russia) Igor Kulbaev | WIN
(North Macedonia) Aleksandre Stajkovski
(Italy) Michele Manzoni
(Poland) Mariusz Ziętek | D(3:0)
(France) Ahmed Kouranfal | WIN
(Slovenia) Mitja Sauperl
(Serbia and Montenegro) Ahmet Pepic
(Hungary) Robert Arvai | D(2:1)

Semi Finals
(Russia) Igor Kulbaev | D(3:0)
(Poland) Mariusz Ziętek
(France) Ahmed Kouranfal
(Hungary) Robert Arvai | D(3:0)

Final
(Russia) Igor Kulbaev | D(3:0)
(Hungary) Robert Arvai

=== Key ===
| Abbreviation | Meaning |
|---|---|
| D (2:1) | Decision (Winners Score:Losers Score) |
| WIN | KO or Walkover - official source unclear |

== See also ==
- List of WAKO Amateur European Championships
- List of WAKO Amateur World Championships
- List of male kickboxers
