= Women's Full-Contact at W.A.K.O European Championships 2004 Budva -60 kg =

| Women's Full-Contact Kickboxing at the W.A.K.O. European Championships 2004 (Budva) |
|---|
| -48 kg |
| -52 kg |
| -56 kg |
| -60 kg |
| -65 kg |
| -70 kg |
| +70 kg |

The women's middleweight (60 kg/132 lbs) Full-Contact category at the W.A.K.O. European Championships 2004 in Budva was the fourth heaviest of the female Full-Contact tournaments and involved eight fighters. Each of the matches was three rounds of two minutes each and were fought under Full-Contact kickboxing rules.

The tournament gold medal was won by Cindy Orain from France who defeated Nadine Lemke of Germany in the final by split decision. Defeated semi finalists Monika Florek from Poland and Vera Avdeeva from Russia gained bronze medals for their efforts.

== Results ==
Quarter Finals
(Germany) Nadine Lemke | WIN
(Bosnia and Herzegovina) Sanja Samardzic
(Italy) Barbara Pezzera
(Poland) Monika Florek | D(3:0)
(France) Cindy Orain | D(3:0)
(Serbia and Montenegro) Suzana Radovanovic
(Finland) Katarina Perkkio
(Russia) Vera Avdeeva | D(2:1)

Semi Finals
(Germany) Nadine Lemke | D(3:0)
(Poland) Monika Florek
(France) Cindy Orain | D(3:0)
(Russia) Vera Avdeeva

Final
(Germany) Nadine Lemke
(France) Cindy Orain | D(2:1)

=== Key ===
| Abbreviation | Meaning |
|---|---|
| D (2:1) | Decision (Winners Score:Losers Score) |
| WIN | KO or Walkover - official source unclear |

== See also ==
- List of WAKO Amateur European Championships
- List of WAKO Amateur World Championships
- List of female kickboxers
