= Women's Thai-Boxing at W.A.K.O European Championships 2004 Budva -65 kg =

Women's Thai-Boxing at the W.A.K.O. European Championships 2004 (Budva)
-52 kg
-65 kg

The women's light heavyweight (65 kg/143 lbs) Thai-Boxing division at the W.A.K.O. European Championships 2004 in Budva was the heaviest of the female Thai-Boxing tournaments and involved just three fighters. Each of the matches was three rounds of two minutes each and were fought under Thai-Boxing rules.

The tournament winner was Nadine Dinkler from Germany who defeated Olga Kokorina from Russia by unanimous decision to claim gold. Milanka Kragovic from Serbia and Montenegro claimed bronze.

== Results ==
Semi Finals		Final
		(Russia) Olga Kokorina
(Germany) Nadine Dinkler	WIN	(Germany) Nadine Dinkler	D(3:0)
(Serbia and Montenegro) Milanka Kragovic

=== Key ===
Abbreviation	Meaning
D (2:1)	Decision (Winners Score:Losers Score)
WIN	KO or Walkover - official source unclear

== See also ==
- List of WAKO Amateur European Championships
- List of WAKO Amateur World Championships
- List of female kickboxers
