= Men's Full-Contact at W.A.K.O. European Championships 2004 Budva -51 kg =

| Men's Full-Contact Kickboxing at the W.A.K.O. European Championships 2004 (Budva) |
|---|
| -51 kg |
| -54 kg |
| -57 kg |
| -60 kg |
| -63 kg |
| -67 kg |
| -71 kg |
| -75 kg |
| -81 kg |
| -86 kg |
| -91 kg |
| +91 kg |

The men's light bantamweight (51 kg/112.2 lbs) Full-Contact category at the W.A.K.O. European Championships 2004 in Budva was the lightest of the male Full-Contact tournaments and also the smallest of the men's competitions, involving just three fighters. Each of the matches was three rounds of two minutes each and were fought under Full-Contact kickboxing rules.

Due to the low levels of competitors for a tournament fit for four, one of the fighters had a bye straight through to the final. The tournament champion was Dmitry Ayzyatulov from Russia who needed just one match to win the gold, defeating Italian Ivan Sciolla by unanimous decision. Srdan Hadrlyanski from host nation Serbia and Montenegro took the bronze medal position.

== Results ==
| Semi Finals | | Final |
| | | (Russia) Dmitry Ayzyatulov | D(3:0) |
| (Serbia and Montenegro) Srdan Hadrlyanski | | (Italy) Ivan Sciolla |
| (Italy) Ivan Sciolla | D(3:0) |

=== Key ===
| Abbreviation | Meaning |
|---|---|
| D (2:1) | Decision (Winners Score:Losers Score) |
| WIN | KO or Walkover - official source unclear |

== See also ==
- List of WAKO Amateur European Championships
- List of WAKO Amateur World Championships
- List of male kickboxers
