= Women's Low-Kick at W.A.K.O European Championships 2004 Budva -65 kg =

Women's Low-Kick Kickboxing at the W.A.K.O. European Championships 2004 (Budva)
-48 kg
-52 kg
-56 kg
-60 kg
-65 kg
-70 kg

The women's light heavyweight (65 kg/143 lbs) Low-Kick division at the W.A.K.O. European Championships 2004 in Budva was the second heaviest of the female Low-Kick tournaments and involved just three fighters. Each of the matches was three rounds of two minutes each and were fought under Low-Kick kickboxing rules.

Due to the fact there were not enough women for a tournament designed for four, one of the ladies had a bye straight through to the final. The tournament winner was Lopatina Lyubov from Russia who defeated Maria Domenica Mandolini from Italy in the final by unanimous decision to claim gold. The bronze medal position was taken by Ana Mandic from Croatia.

== Results ==
Semi Finals		Final
(Russia) Lopatina Lyubov	D(3:0)
(Croatia) Ana Mandic		(Russia) Lopatina Lyubov	D(3:0)
		(Italy) Maria Domenica Mandolini

=== Key ===
Abbreviation	Meaning
D (2:1)	Decision (Winners Score:Losers Score)
WIN	KO or Walkover - official source unclear

== See also ==
- List of WAKO Amateur European Championships
- List of WAKO Amateur World Championships
- List of female kickboxers
