= Men's Low-Kick at W.A.K.O. European Championships 2004 Budva +91 kg =

Men's Low-Kick Kickboxing at the W.A.K.O. European Championships 2004 (Budva)
-51 kg
-54 kg
-57 kg
-60 kg
-63 kg
-67 kg
-71 kg
-75 kg
-81 kg
-86 kg
-91 kg
+91 kg

The men's super heavyweight (+91 kg/200.2 lbs) Low-Kick division at the W.A.K.O. European Championships 2004 in Budva was the heaviest of the male Low-Kick tournaments and involved five fighters. Each of the matches was three rounds of two minutes each and were fought under Low-Kick kickboxing rules.

Due to there not being enough men for a tournament fit for eight, three of the fighters received a bye into the semi-finals. The tournament was won by future K-1 regional champion Łukasz Jarosz from Poland who defeated Daniele Petroni from Italy in the final by unanimous decision. Defeated semi finalists Dragan Jovanović from Serbia and Montenegro and Ruslan Bisaev from Russia had to make do with bronze medals.

== Results ==
Quarter-finals
(Hungary) Norbert Harrapi
(Poland) Łukasz Jarosz	WIN

Semi-finals
(Russia) Ruslan Bisaev
(Poland) Łukasz Jarosz	D(2:1)
(Italy) Daniele Petroni	D(3:0)
(Serbia and Montenegro) Dragan Jovanović

Final
(Poland) Łukasz Jarosz	D(3:0)
(Italy) Daniele Petroni

=== Key ===
Abbreviation	Meaning
D (2:1)	Decision (Winners Score:Losers Score)
WIN	KO or Walkover - official source unclear

== See also ==
- List of WAKO Amateur European Championships
- List of WAKO Amateur World Championships
- List of male kickboxers
