= Men's Low-Kick at W.A.K.O. European Championships 2004 Budva -71 kg =

Men's Low-Kick Kickboxing at the W.A.K.O. European Championships 2004 (Budva)
-51 kg
-54 kg
-57 kg
-60 kg
-63 kg
-67 kg
-71 kg
-75 kg
-81 kg
-86 kg
-91 kg
+91 kg

The men's light middleweight (71 kg/156.2 lbs) Low-Kick division at the W.A.K.O. European Championships 2004 in Budva was the sixth heaviest of the male Low-Kick tournaments and involved eight fighters. Each of the matches was three rounds of two minutes each and were fought under Low-Kick kickboxing rules.

The tournament gold medal was won by future K-1 MAX fighter and pro world champion Michał Głogowski from Poland who defeated Andrey Borodulin from Belarus in the final by unanimous decision. Semi finalists Ile Risteski from Macedonia and Khizri Saipov from Russia received bronze medals.

== Results ==
Quarter Finals
(Hungary) Janos Geirjalz
(Belarus) Andrey Borodulin	D(3:0)
(Portugal) José Batista
(North Macedonia) Ile Risteski	WIN
(Bosnia and Herzegovina) Denis Marijanovic
(Russia) Khizri Saipov	D(3:0)
(Poland) Michał Głogowski	D(3:0)
(Italy) Stefano Lonzi

Semi Finals
(Belarus) Andrey Borodulin	D(3:0)
(North Macedonia) Ile Risteski
(Russia) Khizri Saipov
(Poland) Michał Głogowski	D(3:0)

Final
(Belarus) Andrey Borodulin
(Poland) Michał Głogowski	D(3:0)

=== Key ===
Abbreviation	Meaning
D (2:1)	Decision (Winners Score:Losers Score)
WIN	KO or Walkover - official source unclear

== See also ==
- List of WAKO Amateur European Championships
- List of WAKO Amateur World Championships
- List of male kickboxers
