= Men's Full-Contact at W.A.K.O. European Championships 2004 Budva -86 kg =

Men's Full-Contact Kickboxing at the W.A.K.O. European Championships 2004 (Budva)
-51 kg
-54 kg
-57 kg
-60 kg
-63 kg
-67 kg
-71 kg
-75 kg
-81 kg
-86 kg
-91 kg
+91 kg

The men's cruiserweight (86 kg/189.2 lbs) Full-Contact category at the W.A.K.O. European Championships 2004 in Budva was the third heaviest of the male Full-Contact tournaments and involved just six participants. Each of the matches was three rounds of two minutes each and were fought under Full-Contact kickboxing rules.

Due to the low level of contestants two of the men received a bye through to the semi-finals. The gold medal winner was host nation Serbia and Montenegro's Slobodan Marinkovic who defeated Robert Paulsbyen from Norway in the final by split decision after three rounds. Gamzat Isalmagomedov from Russia and Piotr Walczak from Poland gained bronze medals.

== Results ==
Quarter-finals		Semi-finals		Final
		(Serbia and Montenegro) Slobodan Marinkovic	D(2:1)
(Belarus) Aliaksei Liashkevich		(Russia) Gamzat Isalmagomedov
(Russia) Gamzat Isalmagomedov	WIN			(Serbia and Montenegro) Slobodan Marinkovic	D(2:1)
(Poland) Piotr Walczak	D(3:0)			(Norway) Robert Paulsbyen
(Italy) Gianni Laterza		(Poland) Piotr Walczak
		(Norway) Robert Paulsbyen	D(3:0)

=== Key ===
Abbreviation	Meaning
D (2:1)	Decision (Winners Score:Losers Score)
WIN	KO or Walkover - official source unclear

== See also ==
- List of WAKO Amateur European Championships
- List of WAKO Amateur World Championships
- List of male kickboxers
