= Women's Full-Contact at W.A.K.O European Championships 2004 Budva -70 kg =

Women's Full-Contact Kickboxing at the W.A.K.O. European Championships 2004 (Budva)
-48 kg
-52 kg
-56 kg
-60 kg
-65 kg
-70 kg
+70 kg

The women's heavyweight (70 kg/154 lbs) Full-Contact category at the W.A.K.O. European Championships 2004 in Budva was the second heaviest of the female Full-Contact tournaments and involved just five fighters. Each of the matches were three rounds of two minutes each and were fought under Full-Contact kickboxing rules.

As there were too few competitors for an eight-woman tournament, three of the fighters received a bye into the semi-finals. The tournament gold medallist was Julia Chernenko from Russia who defeated Karolina Lukasik from Poland by unanimous decision in the final. Pierina Guerreri from Italy and Jelena Duric from hosts Serbia and Montenegro claimed bronze.

== Results ==
Quarter-finals
(Italy) Pierina Guerreri	D(3:0)
(Sweden) Sabrina Sedin

Semi-finals
(Poland) Karolina Lukasik	D(3:0)
(Italy) Pierina Guerreri
(Serbia and Montenegro) Jelena Duric
(Russia) Julia Chernenko	D(3:0)

Final
(Poland) Karolina Lukasik
(Russia) Julia Chernenko	D(3:0)

=== Key ===
Abbreviation	Meaning
D (2:1)	Decision (Winners Score:Losers Score)
WIN	KO or Walkover - official source unclear

== See also ==
- List of WAKO Amateur European Championships
- List of WAKO Amateur World Championships
- List of female kickboxers
