= Men's Full-Contact at W.A.K.O. European Championships 2004 Budva -67 kg =

Men's Full-Contact Kickboxing at the W.A.K.O. European Championships 2004 (Budva)
-51 kg
-54 kg
-57 kg
-60 kg
-63 kg
-67 kg
-71 kg
-75 kg
-81 kg
-86 kg
-91 kg
+91 kg

The men's welterweight (67 kg/147.4 lbs) Full-Contact category at the W.A.K.O. European Championships 2004 in Budva was the sixth lightest of the male Full-Contact tournaments and involved twelve participants. Each of the matches was three rounds of two minutes each and were fought under Full-Contact kickboxing rules.

As there were too few men for a tournament designed for sixteen four of the fighters received byes through to the quarter finals. The gold medal was won by Jere Reinikainen from Finland who defeated Roman Pijouk from Russia by split decision in the final. It was a second W.A.K.O. gold for Jere who was also the reigning W.A.K.O. world champion from the event in Paris in 2003. Semi final losers Edmond Mebenga from France and Sinisa Vladimirovic from the host nation Serbia and Montenegro were awarded with bronze medals.

== Results ==
1st Round
(Sweden) Jon Johannsson
(Italy) Simone Procaccini	D(3:0)
(France) Edmond Mebenga	D(3:0)
(Iran) Behboudi
(Serbia and Montenegro) Sinisa Vladimirovic	D(3:0)
(Slovenia) Gregor Stracanek
(Bulgaria) Stilian Angelov
(Poland) Tomasz Pietraszewski	D(3:0)

Quarter Finals
(Finland) Jere Reinikainen	D(2:1)
(Italy) Simone Procaccini
(France) Edmond Mebenga	D(3:0)
(Germany) Viktor Hoffmann
(Serbia and Montenegro) Sinisa Vladimirovic	D(3:0)
(Norway) Christian Kvatningen
(Poland) Tomasz Pietraszewski
(Russia) Roman Pijouk	WIN

Semi Finals
(Finland) Jere Reinikainen	D(2:1)
(France) Edmond Mebenga
(Serbia and Montenegro) Sinisa Vladimirovic
(Russia) Roman Pijouk	WIN

Final
(Finland) Jere Reinikainen	D(3:2)
(Russia) Roman Pijouk

=== Key ===
Abbreviation	Meaning
D (2:1)	Decision (Winners Score:Losers Score)
WIN	KO or Walkover - official source unclear

== See also ==
- List of WAKO Amateur European Championships
- List of WAKO Amateur World Championships
- List of male kickboxers
