= Women's Low-Kick at W.A.K.O European Championships 2004 Budva -70 kg =

Women's Low-Kick Kickboxing at the W.A.K.O. European Championships 2004 (Budva)
-48 kg
-52 kg
-56 kg
-60 kg
-65 kg
-70 kg

The women's heavyweight (70 kg/154 lbs) Low-Kick division at the W.A.K.O. European Championships 2004 in Budva was the heaviest of the female Low-Kick tournaments and involved just three fighters. Each of the matches was three rounds of two minutes each and were fought under Low-Kick kickboxing rules.

As there were not enough contestants for a tournament fit for four, one of the women had a bye through to the final. The tournament winner was Croatian Radic Nives who defeated Andreeva Svetlana from Russia by unanimous decision to claim gold. Olivera Milanovic from Serbia and Montenegro claimed bronze.

== Results ==
Semi Finals		Final
(Russia) Andreeva Svetlana	D(3:0)
(Serbia and Montenegro) Olivera Milanovic		(Russia) Andreeva Svetlana
		(Croatia) Radic Nives	D(3:0)

=== Key ===
Abbreviation	Meaning
D (2:1)	Decision (Winners Score:Losers Score)
WIN	KO or Walkover - official source unclear

== See also ==
- List of WAKO Amateur European Championships
- List of WAKO Amateur World Championships
- List of female kickboxers
