= Men's Low-Kick at WAKO World Championships 2007 Belgrade -71 kg =

The men's light middleweight (71 kg/156.2 lbs) Low-Kick category at the W.A.K.O. World Championships 2007 in Belgrade was the sixth heaviest of the male Low-Kick tournaments, involving seventeen fighters from three continents (Europe, Asia and South America). Each of the matches was three rounds of two minutes each and were fought under Low-Kick rules.

As there were not enough fighters for a tournament designed for thirty-two, fifteen of the fighters received a bye through to the second round. The tournament winner was Russia's Konstantin Sbytov who claimed gold by defeating K-1 MAX fighter and 2004 W.A.K.O. European amateur champion Michal Glogowski from Poland. Paolo Iry from France and Milan Dragojlovic from Serbia won bronze medals.

== Results ==
1st Round
(Kyrgyzstan) Kumar Jaliev
(Azerbaijan) Kanan Sadiqov | D(2:1)

2nd Round
(Poland) Michal Glogowski | D(3:0)
(Greece) Nazarenko Vladimiros
(Bulgaria) Svetoslav Maleschkov | D(3:0)
(Hungary) Robert Szoke
(Croatia) Frane Radnić
(France) Paolo Iry | WO
(Belarus) Vadzim Mazanik | D(3:0)
(Kazakhstan) Bobizhan Artykbayev
(Brazil) Wellington Uega
(Serbia) Milan Dragojlovic | D(3:0)
(Italy) Andrea Andrenacci | D(2:1)
(Azerbaijan) Kanan Sadiqov
(North Macedonia) Dalibor Ognajnov | D(3:0)
(Ukraine) Rostislav Khvorost
(Israel) Kirill Grigoriev
(Russia) Konstantin Sbytov | D(3:0)

Quarter Finals
(Poland) Michal Glogowski | D(3:0)
(Bulgaria) Svetoslav Maleschkov
(France) Paolo Iry | D(2:1)
(Belarus) Vadzim Mazanik
(Serbia) Milan Dragojlovic | D(3:0)
(Italy) Andrea Andrenacci
(North Macedonia) Dalibor Ognajnov
(Russia) Konstantin Sbytov | D(3:0)

Semi Finals
(Poland) Michal Glogowski | D(3:0)
(France) Paolo Iry
(Serbia) Milan Dragojlovic
(Russia) Konstantin Sbytov | D(3:0)

Final
(Poland) Michal Glogowski
(Russia) Konstantin Sbytov | D(2:1)

=== Key ===
| Abbreviation | Meaning |
|---|---|
| D (3:0) | Decision (Unanimous) |
| D (2:1) | Decision (Split) |
| WO | Walkover (No fight) |

== See also ==
- List of WAKO Amateur World Championships
- List of WAKO Amateur European Championships
- List of male kickboxers
