= Tim Thomas (kickboxer) =

British Muay Thai kickboxer (born 1983)

- Born: Timothy Benjamin Thomas; 28 March 1983 (age 43); Bedford, England
- Other names: TNT
- Nationality: English
- Height: 1.78 m (5 ft 10 in)
- Weight: 67 kg (148 lb; 10.6 st)
- Division: Welterweight; Middleweight
- Style: Muay Thai
- Stance: Orthodox
- Fighting out of: Northampton, England
- Team: Nak Soo Muay Thai
- Trainer: Jon Graham
- Years active: 2001 present

Kickboxing record
- Total: 84
- Wins: 62
- By knockout: 36
- Losses: 20
- By knockout: 5
- Draws: 2

Other information
- Children: 1
- Last updated on: May 2017

Timothy Benjamin Thomas (born 28 March 1983) is a British Muay Thai kickboxer who competes in the welterweight and middleweight divisions. He came to prominence by winning the UKMF British Welterweight Muay Thai title early in his career before becoming the ISKA World Welterweight Muay Thai Champion in 2005. He lost this belt in 2008 after one successful title defence, but later became a world champion for the second time in Jersey against Michael Blood for the WRSA title. He won by TKO in the 5th round. He then regained the ISKA World title under Kun Khmer rules in 2011.

== Career ==
A British Jamaican, Thomas first came to prominence when he won the UKMF British Welterweight (−67 kg/147 lb) Muay Thai Championship early in his career. In 2005, he defeated Farid Laidhouni in Belgium to win the ISKA World Welterweight (−67 kg/147 lb) Muay Thai title.

The following year, on 2 April 2006, he fought at the historic Rajadamnern Stadium in Bangkok, Thailand for the first time where he knocked out Samart Sor Kor Pira in round two. He then made the first defence of his ISKA world title by winning on points in Glasgow, Scotland against Lloyd Cochrane on 15 October 2006.

He lost his ISKA strap to Frankie Hudders on 29 March 2008 when he lost a majority decision in Manchester, England. Thomas was given the chance to win another world title when he took on Abraham Roqueñi for the ISKA World Super Welterweight (−69.5 kg/153 lb) Freestyle Kickboxing title in Laredo, Spain on 11 April 2009 but was knocked out with a high kick in the seventh round.

On 23 March 2010, Thomas competed in the I-1 World Muaythai Grand Prix 2010, a 66 kg/145 lb one-night, eight-man tournament held in Kowloon Bay, Hong Kong and was eliminated at the quarter-final stage when he lost a split decision to Santichai Or. Boonchauy. He returned to the following year's edition of the tournament, the I-1 World Muaythai Grand Prix 2011 on 21 April 2011, and fared slightly better by besting Lerm Ratchakhom by unanimous decision in the quarters before losing a split decision to Kurt Finlayson in the semis.

Thomas became a world champion for the second time by defeating Michael Blood in Jersey by 5th-round TKO. Stopping him with kicks giving Michael a suspected broken arm. On 6 July 2011 he defeated Maes Chantha by technical knockout at the Olympic Stadium in Phnom Penh, Cambodia to regain the ISKA World Welterweight Kun Khmer title. He sent his opponent to the canvas three times in the fifth round, forcing the referee to stop the bout. The fight was not without controversy, however as Thomas was unable to make the contracted weight of 67 kg/147 lb on the scales provided and instead weighed in at 68.0 kg/151 lb. Just twenty-four days later, Thomas fought to a draw with former Rajadamnern champion Malaipet in Las Vegas, Nevada, United States.

On 20 January 2012, he lost on points against Ludovic Millet in a five-rounder for the vacant ISKA World Super Welterweight (−69.5 kg/153.2 lb) Oriental Championship in Meaux, France.

In 2012, he signed with the Glory promotion and was included in the 2012 Middleweight Slam tournament, replacing Tie Yinghua on short notice to join sixteen of the world's best fighters at 70 kg/154 lb. The tournament kicked off in Stockholm, Sweden at Glory 1: Stockholm - 2012 Middleweight Slam First 16 on 26 May 2012 where he defeated Dennis Schneidmiller by unanimous decision.

Advancing to the tournament final eight at Glory 3: Rome - 2012 Middleweight Slam Final 8 in Rome, Italy on 3 November 2012, Thomas was drawn against Robin van Roosmalen at the quarter-finals. He was wobbled with a variety of blows by the Dutchman, forcing the referee to stop the bout in round two.

He met Reece McAllister in a 67 kg/147 lb catchweight bout at Glory 5: London on 23 March 2013 in London, England and lost a unanimous decision.

He TKO'd Marcel Tratnik in round two at Day of Destruction 7 in Hamburg, Germany on 14 September 2013 to win the WFCA European Junior Middleweight (−69.85 kg/154 lb) K-1 Championship.

Thomas competed at the −65 kg/143 lb Thai Max tournament in Meyreuil, France on 19 October 2013, defeating Alessio D'Angelo by unanimous decision in the quarter-finals before losing to the eventual champion Damien Alamos by the same margin in the semis.

He lost to Reece McAllister on points after being dropped with an elbow in a highly anticipated rematch at Yokkao 8 in Bolton, England on 8 March 2014.

Thomas attempted a comeback against prospect Connor McCormack on 4 June 2016 at Champions Collide in Coventry, England. Tim lost the fight in the second round via head kick knockout before again announcing his retirement from the sport.

== Championships and awards ==
=== Kickboxing ===
- International Sport Karate Association
  - ISKA World Welterweight (−67 kg/147 lb) Muay Thai Championship
  - ISKA World Welterweight (−67 kg/147 lb) Kun Khmer Championship
- United Kingdom Muaythai Federation
  - UKMF British Welterweight (−67 kg/147 lb) Muay Thai Championship
- World Full Contact Association
  - WFCA European Junior Middleweight (−69.85 kg/154 lb) K-1 Championship

== Kickboxing record ==
Kickboxing record
62 wins (36 KOs), 15 losses, 1 draw
Date	Result	Opponent	Event	Location	Method	Round	Time
2016-06-04	Loss	(England) Connor McCormack	Champions Collide	Coventry, England	KO (high kick)	2	2:20
2014-03-08	Loss	(England) Reece McAllister	Yokkao 8	Bolton, England	Decision	3	3:00
2013-10-19	Loss	(France) Damien Alamos	Thai Max, Semi Finals	Meyreuil, France	Decision (unanimous)	3	3:00
2013-10-19	Win	(Italy) Alessio D'Angelo	Thai Max, Quarter Finals	Meyreuil, France	Decision (unanimous)	3	3:00
2013-09-14	Win	(Germany) Marcel Tratnik	Day of Destruction 7	Hamburg, Germany	TKO	2	
Wins the WFCA European Junior Middleweight (−69.85 kg/154 lb) K-1 Championship.
2013-03-23	Loss	(England) Reece McAllister	Glory 5: London	London, England	Decision (unanimous)	3	3:00
2012-11-03	Loss	(Netherlands) Robin van Roosmalen	Glory 3: Rome – 70 kg Slam Tournament, Quarter Finals	Rome, Italy	TKO (referee stoppage)	2	1:05
2012-05-26	Win	(Germany) Dennis Schneidmiller	Glory 1: Stockholm – 70 kg Slam Tournament, First Round	Stockholm, Sweden	Decision (unanimous)	3	3:00
2012-03-31	Win	(England) Andy Thrasher	The Main Event	Manchester, England	TKO (punches)	2	
2012-01-21	Loss	(France) Ludovic Millet	Championnat du Monde ISKA	Meaux, France	Decision	5	3:00
For the ISKA World Super Welterweight (−69.5 kg/153.2lb) Oriental Championship.
2011-11-06	Win	(England) Imran Khan	Showdown 10	Sheffield, England	KO (right elbow)	5	
2011-07-30	Draw	(Thailand) Malaipet	Elite Kickboxing	Las Vegas, Nevada, USA	Decision (majority)	5	3:00
2011-07-06	Win	(Cambodia) Meas Chantha		Phnom Penh, Cambodia	TKO (referee stoppage)	5	
Wins the ISKA World Welterweight (−67kg/147lb) Kun Khmer Championship.
2011-04-21	Loss	(Australia) Kurt Finlayson	I-1 World Muaythai Grand Prix 2011, Semi Finals	Kowloon Bay, Hong Kong	Decision (split)	3	3:00
2011-04-21	Win	(Thailand) Lerm Ratchakhom	I-1 World Muaythai Grand Prix 2011, Quarter Finals	Kowloon Bay, Hong Kong	Decision (unanimous)	3	3:00
2010-09-11	Loss	(Belarus) Andrei Kotsur	Fight Sport Champions Trophy, Quarter Finals	Birmingham, England	Decision	3	3:00
2010-05-29	Win	(Thailand) Yodyut Kiatyongyut	MSA Muaythai Premier League	London, England	TKO (referee stoppage)	4	
2010-03-23	Loss	(Thailand) Santichai Or. Boonchauy	I-1 World Muaythai Grand Prix 2010, Quarter Finals	Kowloon Bay, Hong Kong	Decision (split)	3	3:00
2009-04-11	Loss	(Spain) Abraham Roqueñi		Laredo, Spain	KO (high kick)	7	
For the ISKA World Super Welterweight (−69.5 kg/153lb) Freestyle Championship.
2008-11-00	Loss	(England) Jordan Watson	The Contender Asia UK Tournament, Quarter Finals	Watford, England	Decision	3	3:00
2008-03-29	Loss	(England) Frankie Hudders	ISKA World Championship Thaiboxing	Manchester, England	Decision (majority)	5	3:00
Loses the ISKA World Welterweight (−67kg/147lb) Muay Thai Championship.
2007-11-11	Win	(England) Michael Dicks	Muay Thai Superfights	Wolverhampton, England	TKO (cut)	2	
2007-05-20	Loss	(Algeria) Sofiane Allouache	K-1 UK MAX Tournament 2007 Pain & Glory, Semi Finals	London, England	TKO (referee stoppage)	1	
2007-05-20	Win	(England) Leroy Morgardo	K-1 UK MAX Tournament 2007 Pain & Glory, Reserve Match	London, England	Decision	3	3:00
2007-03-04	Loss	(England) Craig Jose	Power of Scotland 2, Semi Finals	Scotland	Decision	3	3:00
2007-03-04	Win	(Slovakia) Rudolf Durica	Power of Scotland 2, Quarter Finals	Scotland	Decision	3	3:00
2006-10-15	Win	(Scotland) Lloyd Cochrane	New Breed	Glasgow, Scotland	Decision	5	3:00
Retains the ISKA World Welterweight (−67kg/147lb) Muay Thai Championship.
2006-04-02	Win	(Thailand) Samart Sor Kor Pira	Rajadamnern Stadium	Bangkok, Thailand	KO	2	
2005-00-00	Win	(Belgium) Farid Laidhouni		Belgium			
Wins the ISKA World Welterweight (−67kg/147lb) Muay Thai Championship.
2004-07-24	Win	(Japan) Yutaro Yamauchi	AJKF: Super Fight ~ Maximum	Tokyo, Japan	TKO (cut)	4	0:36
2003-11-09	Loss	(England) Neil Woods	K-1 UK MAX 2003, Semi Finals	Birmingham, England	KO	2	
2003-11-09	Win	(Republic of Ireland) Seamus Cogan	K-1 UK MAX 2003, Quarter Finals	Birmingham, England	Decision (unanimous)	3	3:00
2003-08-10	Win	(United Kingdom) Shawn Brady	English Fight 3	Birmingham, England	Decision (unanimous)	3	3:00
2003-06-09	Win	(United Kingdom) Sean Lomas	British Thai Show	Birmingham, England	Decision (unanimous)	3	3:00
2003-03-21	Win	(United Kingdom) Tony Kane	English Fight Series	Birmingham, England	Decision (unanimous)	3	3:00
Legend: Win Loss Draw/No contest Notes
