= Damien Alamos =

French professional Muay Thai fighter (born 1990)

- Born: July 30, 1990 (age 36); Bordeaux, France
- Native name: แดนเนี่ยน อลามูด
- Nickname: White Lion (สิงห์ขาว)
- Height: 178 cm (5 ft 10 in)
- Division: Super Lightweight
- Style: Muay Thai (Muay Femur)
- Stance: Orthodox
- Fighting out of: Phuket, Thailand
- Team: Singpatong Impacts
- Years active: 1999–2014, 2020–present

Kickboxing record
- Total: 76
- Wins: 61
- By knockout: 28
- Losses: 14
- Draws: 1

Damien Alamos (born July 30, 1990) is a French professional Muay Thai fighter. He is a former Lumpinee Stadium, WMC, and WPMF World Muaythai champion. For his professional fighting career he is jointly managed by Numnoi and Rodrigo Alamos. He is a member of Singpatong Sitnumnoi and Impacts Bordeaux Clubs.

== Biography and career ==
At Lumpinee Stadium, Alamos became WPMF World Champion winning his bout against Iranian Abat Muaythaiacademy. He had a recent bout with Orono Wor Petchpun (World Champion, Lumpinee Champion, Thailand Champion, It's Showtime Champion), in which he was unsuccessful although he has plenty to offer in the future as one of France's rising stars in Muaythai.

He became the first non-Thai to defend a Lumpinee title in September 2012.

He was scheduled to rematch Houcine Bennoui at Time Fight 2 in Tours, France on October 6, 2012, but the fight was cancelled in order for Alamos to face Diesellek Aoodonmuang at Lumpinee on October 12, 2012. He lost to Diesellek via decision in a non-title fight.

He lost a decision to the legendary Saenchai PKSaenchaimuaythaigym at Best of Siam 2 in Paris on November 22, 2012.

Alamos rematched Lampard Sor. Khamsing in southern Thailand on February 8, 2013, and won with a second round high kick KO.

He lost to Thongchai Sitthongsak via TKO at Lumpinee on March 8, 2013, in a non-title fight.

He defeated Kongbeng Mor Ratanabandit by unanimous decision to win the WMC World Lightweight title (-135 lb) at Bangla Stadium on April 28, 2013.

Alamos rematched Singsuriya Mor.Ratanabandit at Lumpinee on July 16, 2013, and won by KO in round two to make the second defence of his lightweight title.

Alamos won the -65 kg/143 lb Thai Max tournament in Meyreul, France on October 19, 2013, defeating Crice Boussoukou and Tim Thomas by unanimous decision in the quarter-finals and semi-finals, respectively, before beating Houcine Bennoui by TKO due to a cut in the final.

He was set fight Liam Harrison at Yokkao 8 in Bolton, England on March 8, 2014 but withdrew from the fight, claiming to have a hand injury, and was replaced by Houcine Bennoui.

In 2014 Damien Alamos has retired from the rings. Residing in Thailand he converted to Islam.

On August 28, 2020, Alamos returned from retirement and signed up with ARENA FIGHT Championship to fight at AFC2 on December 12.

== Titles and accomplishments ==
- FFSCDA
  - 2009 FFSCDA French Muay Thai Class A Super Lightweight (140 lbs) Champion
- World Muaythai Professional Federation
  - 2010 W.P.M.F. World Muaythai Super Lightweight (140 lbs) Champion (2 defenses)
  - 2010 W.P.M.F. European Muaythai Super Lightweight (140 lbs) Champion
- THAI MAX
  - 2013 THAI MAX Tournament Champion
- Lumpinee Stadium
  - 2012 Lumpinee Stadium Super Lightweight (140 lbs) Champion (2 defenses)
- World Muaythai Council
  - 2013 WMC World Muaythai Lightweight (135 lbs) Champion

== Muay Thai record ==
Muay Thai record
62 wins (29 (T)KOs), 14 losses, 1 draw
Date	Result	Opponent	Event	Location	Method	Round	Time
2025-11-15	Loss	(Thailand) Thaksinlek Kiatniwat	Road to Rajadamnern	Melbourne, Australia	KO (elbow)	1	
2025-03-08	Loss	(United Kingdom) George Mouzakitis	Hitman Fight League	Manchester, England	Decision	3	3:00
2025-01-25	Loss	(Thailand) Khunhanlek Sor.Sommai	Rajadamnern World Series	Bangkok, Thailand	Decision (unanimous)	5	3:00
2024-05-25	Loss	(Thailand) Petchthongchai Sor.Sommai	Rebellion Muaythai	Melbourne, Australia	Decision (unanimous)	5	3:00
2024-02-15	Win	(Thailand) Gao-A PhuketFightClub	Patong Fight Night, Patong Stadium	Phuket, Thailand	KO (body kick)	1	
2014-01-04	Win	(Thailand) Daoprakai Nor.Sripueng	Suk Singpatong + Sit Numnoi	Phuket, Thailand	KO (right highkick)	2	
2013-10-19	Win	(France) Houcine Bennoui	THAI MAX Tournament, Final	Meyreuil, France	TKO (cut)	2	
Wins the THAI MAX Tournament (-65 kg).
2013-10-19	Win	(England) Tim Thomas	THAI MAX Tournament, Semi Final	Meyreuil, France	Decision (unanimous)	3	3:00
2013-10-19	Win	(France) Crice Boussoukou	THAI MAX Tournament, Quarter Final	Meyreuil, France	Decision (unanimous)	3	3:00
2013-09-06	Win	(Thailand) Fahmongkol Sor Jor Danrayong	Lumpinee Stadium	Bangkok, Thailand	Decision	5	3:00
2013-07-16	Win	(Thailand) Singsuriya Mor Ratanabandit	Lumpinee Stadium	Bangkok, Thailand	KO (left hook)	2	
Defends the Lumpinee Stadium Super Lightweight (140 lbs title).
2013-05-17	Win	(Thailand) Singsuriya Mor Ratanabandit	Impacts Fight Night 3: Premium series	Bordeaux, France	Decision	5	3:00
2013-04-28	Win	(Thailand) Kongbeng Mor Ratanabandit	Bangla Boxing Stadium	Phuket, Thailand	Decision (unanimous)	5	3:00
Wins WMC World Muaythai Lightweight (135 lbs) title.
2013-03-08	Loss	(Thailand) Thongchai Sitsongpeenong	Lumpinee Stadium	Bangkok, Thailand	TKO (elbow)	2	
2013-02-08	Win	(Thailand) Lampard Sor. Khamsing	Muaythai Gala	Thailand	KO (high kick)	2	
2013-01-04	Win	(Thailand) Lamtong Tor.Ponchai	Bangla Boxing Stadium	Phuket, Thailand	Decision	5	3:00
2012-12-02	Win	(Thailand) Saksongkram Poptheeratum	Muaythai Gala	Songkhla, Thailand	TKO (cut)	2	
2012-11-22	Loss	(Thailand) Saenchai PKSaenchaimuaythaigym	Best of Siam 2	Paris, France	Decision	5	3:00
2012-10-12	Loss	(Thailand) Diesellek Aoodonmuang	Lumpinee Stadium	Bangkok, Thailand	Decision	5	3:00
2012-09-07	Win	(Thailand) Aranchai Pran 26	Lumpinee Champion Krikkrai Fight	Bangkok, Thailand	Decision	5	3:00
Defends the Lumpinee Stadium Super Lightweight (140 lbs) title.
2012-08-11	Win	(Thailand) Tanachai Chor.Pradit	Muaythai Gala	Phattalung, Thailand	KO (highkick)	2	
2012-07-21	Win	(Thailand) Lampard Sor Khamsing	Impacts Fights Night: Bangkok sur bassin	Bordeaux, France	Decision	5	3:00
2012-06-01	Win	(Italy) Alessio D'Angelo	Impacts Fights Night	Bordeaux, France	Decision	5	3:00
2012-04-30	Win	(Thailand) Chok Eminentair	Muaythai Gala - WPMF Championship	Surat Thani, Thailand	Decision	5	3:00
Defends the W.P.M.F. World Muaythai Super Lightweight (140 lbs) title.
2012-03-30	Loss	(Thailand) Chok Eminentair	Muaythai Gala	Thailand	Decision	5	3:00
2012-02-10	Win	(Thailand) Kongfah Uddonmuang	Kiatpet promotions, Lumpinee Stadium	Bangkok, Thailand	Decision	5	3:00
Wins the Lumpinee Stadium Super Lightweight (140 lbs title).
2012-01-18	Win	(Thailand) Phet Sa Nguan	Muaythai Gala in Phuket	Phuket, Thailand	KO (left hook)	3	
2011-10-23	Win	(Thailand) Fahmonkon Kor Chaiprayom	Gala Suk Kiatpech - Bangla Boxing Stadium	Phuket, Thailand	KO (left highkick)	1	
2011-09-23	Win	(Thailand) Diesellek Aoodonmuang	Kiatphet Fight, Lumpinee Stadium	Bangkok, Thailand	Decision	5	3:00
Defends the W.P.M.F. World Muaythai Super Lightweight (140 lbs) title.
2011-07-12	Win	(Thailand) Seemanut Sor. Sarinya	Gala Suk Kiatpech	Phatthalung Province	Decision	5	3:00
2011-04-14	Win	(Thailand) Dejsuriya Pumphanmuang	Siam Omnoi Stadium	Bangkok, Thailand	KO (highkick)	4	
2011-03-06	Win	(Thailand) Apisak K.T Gym	TV7 Stadium	Bangkok, Thailand	Decision	5	3:00
2010-11-26	Loss	(Thailand) Sitthichai Sitsongpeenong	La Nuit des Champions 2010	Marseilles, France	Decision	5	3:00
For the "Nuit des Champions" Muaythai belt (-64 kg).
2010-08-20	Loss	(Thailand) Pongsaklek Sitmorlambat	Eminentair Fight, Lumpinee Stadium	Bangkok, Thailand	Decision	5	3:00
2010-04-24	Win	(Spain) Niko Barbera Rocamora	Fight Night 1	Bordeaux, France	Decision	5	3:00
Wins WPMF European Muaythai Super Lightweight (140 lbs) title.
2010-04-10	Loss	(Thailand) Orono Wor Petchpun	Sherdana K-1 Gala	Sardinia, Italy	KO (left elbow)	2	
2010-02-26	Win	(Iran) Abass Ahmadi	Kiatphet Fight, Lumpinee Stadium	Bangkok, Thailand	Decision	5	3:00
Wins the W.P.M.F. World Muaythai Super Lightweight (140 lbs) title.
2009-12-04	Win	(Thailand) Petchbangpung Sakchatri	Kings Birthday	Bangkok, Thailand	KO	3	
2009-11-14	Win	(France) Thomas Adamandopoulos	La Nuit des Champions 2009	Marseille, France	Decision	5	3:00
Defends the FFSCDA French Muaythai Super Lightweight (140 lbs) title.
2009-10-24	Win	(Thailand) Tantawan Windysport	Phumpanmoung Fight, Lumpinee Stadium	Bangkok, Thailand	Decision	5	3:00
2009-09-19	Win	(Thailand) Ronnachai Sitpandiang	Kiatpet Fight, Lumpinee Stadium	Bangkok, Thailand	TKO	2	
2009-08-11	Win	(South Korea) Kim Sung Yong	Queens Birthday	Thailand	KO	2	
2009-06-22	Draw	(France) Salem Messous	Muaythai Gala in Levallois	Levallois, France	Decision draw	5	3:00
2009-05-16	Loss	(France) Houcine Bennoui	Légendes et Guerriers	Toulouse, France	Decision	3	3:00
2009-04-11	Win	(Spain) Mohamed Stitou	Impacts Muaythai & Pancrase Gala	Bordeaux, France	TKO	1	
2009-03-17	Loss	(Thailand) Kingstar Saenpalungchai	Siangmorakot Fights, Lumpinee Stadium	Bangkok, Thailand	Decision	5	3:00
2009-02-07	Win	(France) Brahim Yakoun	International Muaythai Gala	Saumur, France	TKO	1	
2009-01-10	Win	(France) Nordine Bekhtaoui	French Championships FMDA Class B, 1st Round	Paris, France	KO	1	
2008-12-06	Win	(France) Youri Kim	Palais des sports de Beaulieu	Nantes, France	TKO (gave up)	4	
2008-11-08	Win	(Spain) Alberto Lazaro	Kickboxing & Muaythai Gala	Pamplona, Spain	KO (elbow)	1	
2008-04-26	Win	(France) Aziz Alikada	Muaythai Gala, Class B Fight	Pau, France	KO (knee)	3	
2008-02-02	Win	(Belgium) Corentin Lievens	Gala de Saumur	Saumur, France	KO (knee to the liver)		
2006-12-16	Win	(France) Gomez Barbosa	Impacts Aquitaine Gala, Exhibition Match	France	Decision		
2006-01-26	Win	(France) Léo Crepel	Muaythai Gala, Class D Fight	France	Decision	3	
2005-06-04	Win	(France) Tony Dervillier	Muay Thaï Fury 2, Educatif Fight	Bordeaux, France			
Legend: Win Loss Draw/no contest Notes

== See also ==
- List of male kickboxers
