= Andrei Kotsur =

Belarusian Muay Thai welterweight kickboxer

- Born: 11 September 1982 (age 44)
- Other names: White Cat
- Nationality: Belarus
- Height: 1.77 m (5 ft 9 1/2 in)
- Weight: 67 kg (148 lb; 10.6 st)
- Division: Welterweight; Super Lightweight; Super Featherweight
- Style: Muay Thai
- Stance: Orthodox
- Fighting out of: Minsk, Belarus
- Team: Gym "Kick Fighter"
- Trainer: Evgeni Kotelnikov

Kickboxing record
- Total: 41
- Wins: 34
- By knockout: 11
- Losses: 7

Amateur record
- Total: 72
- Wins: 68
- By knockout: 13
- Losses: 4
- Last updated on: 6 July 2011

Andrei "White Cat" Kotsur (born 11 September 1982) is a Belarusian Muay Thai welterweight kickboxer fighting out of the g "Kick Fighter" in Minsk, Belarus where is trained by Evgeni Kotelnikov. He is a four-time pro world and three-time European (two pro, one amateur) Muay Thai champion.

== Career/Biography ==
Andrei started his kickboxing career at the Gym "Kick Fighter" in Minsk under the tutelage of Evgeni Kotelnikov in 1999. As a member of the strongest Muay Thai gym in Belarus and possibly Europe, he gained experience from training alongside champions such as Andrei Kulebin, Dmitry Shakuta, Dmitry Valent, Vasily Shish and Aliaksei Pekarchyk. He first gave notice of his rising talent by taking part in two title fights (albeit unsuccessful) for the World Kickboxing Network (W.K.N) European and world titles in 2001 and 2002 respectively. Andrei also competed in amateur competition, picking up a silver medal at the amateur European championships held in Cyprus in 2002 as well as winning gold two years later at the W.A.K.O. European championships in Budva.

In 2003 Andrei won his first pro title, winning an eight-man tournament in Italy to win up the "King of the Ring" European grand prix at 65 kg (143 lbs). He then followed this up by going to Australia where he defeated Australian based Thai Rhino Pichitchai to claim the I.M.T.F. World Profi Cup. More titles followed the next year as Andrei won first the W.K.N. European title, giving him a shot against world champion Dan Rawlings, who he promptly defeated by decision when the United States team came to Belarus. The following year Andrei gained revenge against a previous opponent who had defeated him, knocking out nine time world champion Osman Yigin in the second round of their match to hold on to his W.K.N. world title. Another successful defence followed as Andrei headed to Turin, Italy where he finished the Italian challenger via a brutal flurry of elbows in the third round.

In 2006 Andrei headed to England where he faced WAKO-Pro world champion Kieran Keddle in a bout for the vacant W.P.K.L. world title. Andrei was unsuccessful after five rounds as the English fighter dominated him but despite the loss would take part in a number of cards across the country over the next couple of years, defeating the likes of Richard Cadden and Nico Verresen but losing to Luke Turner in what was quite an upset as Luke was an upcoming fighter who was standing in for Kostur's original opponent multiple world champion Liam Harrison. Sandwiched between the matches in England was a loss against legendary Full-Contact champion Samir Mohammed in Paris and a victory over a Thai opponent to claim the W.P.K.A. world title, both in 2009.

Andrei returned to England in 2010, winning an eight-man tournament in Birmingham where he defeated three local fighters in one night to be crowned champion. He also faced and lost to a Thai fighter Prathet Sor Thannikel at a Muay Thai show in Crawley. He is currently looking to take part in the W.K.N. Big-8 Grand Prix, to be held in Trinidad and Tobago involving some of the best Muay Thai fighters in the world around the 67-69 kg (147.4-151.8 lbs) mark.

== Titles ==
Professional

- 2010 Fight Sport "Champions Trophy" tournament champion -67 kg
- 2009 W.P.K.A. world champion
- 2005 W.K.N. Muay Thai super welterweight world champion -62.1 kg (2nd defence)
- 2005 W.K.N. Muay Thai world champion -62.1 kg (1st defence)
- 2004 W.K.N. Muay Thai world champion -62.1 kg
- 2004 W.K.N. Muay Thai super welterweight European champion -62.1 kg
- 2003 I.M.T.F. World Profi Cup champion
- 2003 W.I.P.U. "King of the Ring" Europe Grand Prix tournament champion -65 kg

Amateur

- 2004 W.A.K.O. European Championships in Budva, Serbia & Montenegro (gold) -63 kg (Thai-boxing)
- 2002 I.A.M.T.F. European Championships in Cyprus (silver)

== Professional kickboxing record ==
Professional kickboxing record
34 wins (11 (T)KOs), 11 losses
Date	Result	Opponent	Event	Location	Method	Round	Time
2010-11-07	Loss	(Thailand) Prathet Sor Thannikel	Muaythai Warriors XVIII	Crawley, England, UK	Decision	5	3:00
2010-09-11	Win	(England) Thomas McCormick	Fight Sport Champions Trophy, Final	Birmingham, England, UK	Decision	3	3:00
Wins Fight Sport "Champions Trophy" 8-man Muay Thai tournament title -67 kg.
2010-09-11	Win	(England) Dave Copestake	Fight Sport Champions Trophy, Semi Final	Birmingham, England, UK	Decision	3	3:00
2010-09-11	Win	(England) Tim Thomas	Fight Sport Champions Trophy, Quarter Final	Birmingham, England, UK	Decision	3	3:00
2010-05-15	Loss	(England) Luke Turner	Rumble at the Reebok II	Bolton, England, UK	TKO (cut/elbows)	2	
2009-11-24	Win	(Thailand) Surchit		Yakutsk, Russia			
Wins vacant W.P.K.A. Muay Thai world title.
2009-03-26	Loss	(France) Samir Mohamed	Les Stars du Ring	Paris, France	Decision	5	3:00
2007-11-11	Win	(Morocco) Mohamed Elaouaji	Kings of Muay Thai - Russia	Kostroma, Russia	Decision	5	3:00
2007-10-07	Win	(Belgium) Nico Verresen	Muaythai Warriors IX	Crawley, England, UK	Decision	5	3:00
2007-06-01	Win	(Thailand) Paitoon Jaikon	Belarus vs Thailand	Minsk, Belarus	Decision	5	3:00
2006-09-24	Win	(England) Richard Cadden	Master Sken's Combat Super Fights	Manchester, England, UK	TKO (right punch)	5	
2006-04-29	Loss	(England) Kieran Keddle	Muaythai Warriors	Crawley, England, UK	Decision	5	3:00
Fight was for vacant W.P.K.L. Muay Thai light welterweight world title -63.5 kg.
2005-00-00	Win	(Italy) Filippo Cinti		Turin, Italy	KO (elbows)	3	
Retains W.K.N. Muay Thai super featherweight world title -62.1 kg (2nd defence).
2005-09-30	Win	(Turkey) Osman Yigin	Kings of Muaythai: Belarus vs Europe	Minsk, Belarus	KO	2	
Retains W.K.N. Muay Thai super featherweight world title -62.1 kg (1st defence).
2004-07-01	Win	(United States) Dan Rawlings	Kings of Muaythai: Team USA vs. Team Belarus	Minsk, Belarus	Decision	5	3:00
Wins Rawling's W.K.N. Muay Thai super featherweight world title -62.1 kg.
2004-00-00	Win	(Syria) Baker Barakat		Germany	KO		
Wins W.K.N. Muay Thai super featherweight European title -62.1 kg.
2003-05-17	Win	(Thailand) Rhino Pichitchai	Burswood Muaythai World Super Cup	Perth, Australia	Decision	5	3:00
Wins I.M.T.F. Muay Thai World Profi Cup title.
2002-00-00	Win	(Ukraine) Maxim Dubov	Belarus vs Ukraine	Minsk, Belarus			
2002-00-00	Loss	(Turkey) Osman Yigin		Belgium	Decision	5	3:00
Fight was for W.K.N. Muay Thai world title.
2001-06-09	Loss	(Denmark) Dennis Koebke	K-1 World GP '01 Prelim. Scandinavia	Copenhagen, Denmark	Decision	5	3:00
Fight was for W.K.N. Muay Thai junior welterweight European title -63.5 kg.
Legend: Win Loss Draw/no contest Notes

== Amateur kickboxing record ==
Amateur Kickboxing Record
68 wins (13 (T)KOs), 4 losses
Date	Result	Opponent	Event	Location	Method	Round	Time
2004-11-24	Win	(Cyprus) Philip Billides	W.A.K.O. European Championships '04, Final	Budva, Serbia and Montenegro	Decision (unanimous)	3	3:00
Wins 2004 W.A.K.O. European Championships Thai-boxing light welterweight gold medal -63. kg.
2004-11-00	Win	(Hungary) József Vulics	W.A.K.O. European Championships '04, Semi Final	Budva, Serbia and Montenegro	Decision (unanimous)	3	3:00
Legend: Win Loss Draw/no contest Notes

== See also ==
- List of male kickboxers
