= Sagatpetch Sor.Sakulpan =

Muay Thai kickboxer

Sagatpetch
- Born: Somkid Rakchun; June 29, 1982 (age 44); Khuan Khanun district, Phatthalung province, Thailand
- Other names: Sagatpet IngramGym (สกัดเพชร อินแกรมยิม); Sakadphet Sor.Sakulphan; Sakadpetch; Sagadpet Sit Kru Chow
- Height: 1.72 m (5 ft 7 1/2 in)
- Weight: 65 kg (143 lb; 10.2 st)
- Division: Featherweight; Super Featherweight; Lightweight; Super Lightweight; Super Welterweight
- Style: Muay Thai
- Stance: Orthodox
- Fighting out of: Bangkok, Thailand
- Team: Sor.Sakulpan (1995 - 2005); Ingram gym (2006 - 2010)

Other information
- Occupation: Muay Thai trainer

Somkid Rakchun (Thai: สมคิด รักจร), known professionally as Sagatpetch Sor.Sakulpan (Thai: สกัดเพชร ส.สกุลภัณฑ์ is a retired Thai Muay Thai fighter. He is a former Rajadamnern Stadium champion and two-weight Lumpinee Stadium champion.

== Biography and career ==
Sagatpetch started training in Muay Thai at the age of seven in his native Phatthalung province. He had his first fight at the age of eight training out of the Kiatwinai Gym and the Sit Kru Chow camp under the name Sagatpetch Sit Kru Chow. He would become a 90 lbs south Thailand champion. He started to compete in Bangok at the age of thirteen and joined the Sor Sakulpan camp in the Kanchanaburi province.

At Sor.Sakulpan, training alongside other stadium champions Michael, Mithi and Saengphet, Sagatpetch would become a notable fighter of the 2000s, promoted by Songchai Rattansauban. He won his first major titles on September 28, 2002, when he defeated Yodthanu Petchnongnut in the final of the Mitsubishi tournament. He also won the vacant Rajadamnern Stadium Super Featherweight title at this occasion. He defeated many notable champions of his era, such as Lakhin Wassantasit, Jean-Charles Skarbowsky, Nongbee Kiatyongyut, Yodsanklai Fairtex and Singdam Kiatmuu9.

Sagatpetch fought outside Thailand for the first time on January 19, 2003, when he traveled to Tokyo, Japan to face Avis-03 at NJKF Vortex I. He won the fight by unanimous decision.

In late 2005 Sagatpetch switched gyms and joined the Ingram Gym in Bangkok. He started the year 2006 with a knockout win over Wuttichai Sor.Yupinda on February 10, 2006. He then defeated Lakhin Sakjawee by decision on April 10, 2006. On June 6, 2006, Sagatpetch faced Samranchai 96Peenang for the vacant Lumpinee Stadium Lightweight title. He won the fight by unanimous decision.

Sagatpetch was scheduled to face Jaroenchai Kesagym in early 2007 in a "Lumpinee against Rajadamnern champion" matchup with the WMC and Thailand titles at stake. During the preparation for the fight Sagatpetch suffered an injury which would sideline him for two years. He made his return to the ring in March 2009. He won his first comeback fight on July 12, 2009, when he defeated Winailek Por.Rangsan by decision at the Aswindam Stadium.

Sagapetch faced Masaru at the Hachioji Kakutougi Matsuri event on August 2, 2009, in Tokyo, Japan. He won the fight by unanimous decision.

On November 15, 2009, Sagatpetch faced Extra Sor.Rerkchai at the Aswindam Stadium. He lost the fight by unanimous decision after suffering a knockdown.

On August 11, 2010, Sagatpetch faced Andy Thrasher at the Queen's Birthday event in Bangkok. He won the fight by unanimous decision.

Sagatpetch was invited to the 2010 K-1 World MAX Final 16 on October 3, 2010, to face Michał Głogowski. He lost the fight by extension round split decision and didn't qualify for the K-1 World MAX 2010 Final.

After retiring, Sagatpetch became a Muay Thai trainer. He worked in various camps including the Ingram Gym and the Sitsongpeenong. He currently is the Revolution Phuket Gym head trainer.

== Titles and accomplishments ==
=== Muay Thai ===
- Lumpinee Stadium
  - 2005 Lumpinee Stadium Super Featherweight (130 lbs) Champion
  - 2006 Lumpinee Stadium Lightweight (135 lbs) Champion
  - 2006 Lumpinee Stadium Best Wai Kru Award
- Rajadamnern Stadium
  - 2002 Rajadamnern Stadium Super Featherweight (130 lbs) Champion
    - Two successful title defenses
  - 2002 Mitsubishi Tournament Winner
- Regional Thailand
  - South Thailand 90 lbs Champion

=== Pencak Silat ===
- SEA Games
  - 2013 SEA Games Pencak Silat Combat 70 kg (bronze)

== Fight record ==
Professional Muaythai record
90 Wins (17 (T)KOs), 42 Losses
Date	Result	Opponent	Event	Location	Method	Round	Time
2010-10-03	Loss	(Poland) Michał Głogowski	K-1 World MAX 2010 Final 16 - Part 2	Seoul, South Korea	Ext.R Decision (Split)	4	3:00
Fails to qualify for K-1 World MAX 2010 Final.
2010-08-11	Win	(England) Andy Thrasher	WPMF Queen's Birthday	Bangkok, Thailand	Decision (Unanimous)	5	3:00
2010-02-18	Loss	(Thailand) Jaroenchai Kesagym	Daorungchujaroen, Rajadamnern Stadium	Bangkok, Thailand	Decision	5	3:00
2009-11-15	Loss	(Thailand) Extra Sor.Rerkchai	Aswindam Stadium	Bangkok, Thailand	Decision	5	3:00
2009-08-02	Win	(Japan) Masaru	Hachioji Kakutougi Matsuri - Muay Thai no Kabe	Tokyo, Japan	Decision (Unanimous)	5	3:00
2009-07-12	Win	(Thailand) Weenailek Tor.Rangsan	Aswindam Stadium	Bangkok, Thailand	Decision (Unanimous)	5	3:00
2009-04-16	Loss	(Thailand) Phetasawin Seatranferry	Jarumueang, Rajadamnern Stadium	Bangkok, Thailand	Decision	5	3:00
2009-03-02	Loss	(Thailand) Samsamut Kiatchongkhao	Daorungchujaroen, Rajadamnern Stadium	Bangkok, Thailand	Decision	5	3:00
2006-11-17	Loss	(Thailand) Attachai Fairtex	Gaiyanghadao Tournament, Quarter Final	Nakhon Ratchasima, Thailand	Decision	3	3:00
2006-10-06	Win	(Thailand) Singdam Kiatmuu9	Eminent Air, Lumpinee Stadium	Bangkok, Thailand	Decision (Majority)	5	3:00
2006-08-29	Win	(Thailand) Kongpipop Petchyindee	Wanboonya, Lumpinee Stadium	Bangkok, Thailand	Decision (Unanimous)	5	3:00
2006-06-06	Win	(Thailand) Samranchai 96Peenang	Praianan, Lumpinee Stadium	Bangkok, Thailand	Decision (Unanimous)	5	3:00
Wins the vacant Lumpinee Stadium Lightweight (135 lbs) title.
2006-04-10	Win	(Thailand) Lakhin Sakjawee	Petchthongkam, Rajadamnern Stadium	Bangkok, Thailand	Decision	5	3:00
2006-02-10	Win	(Thailand) Wuttichai Sor.Yupinda	Fairtex, Lumpinee Stadium	Bangkok, Thailand	KO	1	
2005-12-20	Loss	(Thailand) Banphot Sor.Boonya	Wanboonya, Lumpinee Stadium	Bangkok, Thailand	Decision	5	3:00
2005-07-29	NC	(Thailand) Nopparat Keatkhamtorn	Lumpinee Stadium	Bangkok, Thailand	Ref.stop (Nopparat dismissed)	5	
2005-06-10	Loss	(Thailand) Orono Wor Petchpun	Petchpiya, Lumpinee Stadium	Bangkok, Thailand	Decision	5	3:00
2005-05-05	Loss	(Thailand) Kongpipop Petchyindee	Petchthongkham + Petchyindee, Rajadamnern Stadium	Bangkok, Thailand	Decision	5	3:00
2005-03-18	Win	(Thailand) Singdam Kiatmuu9	Petchyindee + Kor.Sapaothong, Lumpinee Stadium	Bangkok, Thailand	Decision (Split)	5	3:00
Wins the Lumpinee Stadium Super Featherweight (130 lbs) title.
2005-01-21	Loss	(Thailand) Kongpipop Petchyindee	Wanboonya, Lumpinee Stadium	Bangkok, Thailand	Decision	5	3:00
2004-11-12	Loss	(Thailand) Yodsanklai Fairtex	Fairtex, Lumpinee Stadium	Bangkok, Thailand	Decision	5	3:00
2004-10-08	Loss	(Thailand) Singdam Kiatmuu9	Wanboonya, Lumpinee Stadium	Bangkok, Thailand	Decision	5	3:00
2004-08-27	Win	(Thailand) Yodsanklai Fairtex	Wanboonya, Lumpinee Stadium	Bangkok, Thailand	Decision (Unanimous)	5	3:00
2004-07-09	Loss	(Thailand) Orono Wor Petchpun	Petchpiya, Lumpinee Stadium	Bangkok, Thailand	Decision (Unanimous)	5	3:00
2004-05-05	Win	(Thailand) Nongbee Kiatyongyut	Rajadamnern Stadium	Bangkok, Thailand	Decision	5	3:00
2004-03-04	Draw	(Thailand) Sibmuen Laemthongkarn	Onesongchai, Rajadamnern Stadium	Bangkok, Thailand	Decision	5	3:00
2003-11-26	Loss	(Thailand) Nongbee Kiatyongyut	Rajadamnern Stadium	Bangkok, Thailand	Decision	5	3:00
2003-09-09	Win	(Thailand) Banphot Sor.Boonya	Praianan, Lumpinee Stadium	Bangkok, Thailand	Decision	5	3:00
2003-08-03	Win	(France) Jean-Charles Skarbowsky	Onesongchai + Kiayongyut, Rajadamnern Stadium	Bangkok, Thailand	TKO (Punches)	1	
2003-06-23	Win	(Thailand) Sakawthong Petchnongnut	Onesongchai + Petchthongkam, Rajadamnern Stadium	Bangkok, Thailand	Decision	5	3:00
Defends the Rajadamnern Stadium Super Featherweight (130 lbs) title.
2003-03-13	Win	(Thailand) Khunpinit Kiattawan	Onesongchai, Rajadamnern Stadium	Bangkok, Thailand	Decision	5	3:00
2003-02-13	Win	(Thailand) Khunpinit Kiattawan	Onesongchai, Rajadamnern Stadium	Bangkok, Thailand	Decision	5	3:00
Defends the Rajadamnern Stadium Super Featherweight (130 lbs) title.
2003-01-19	Win	(Japan) AVIS-03	NJKF VORTEX I	Tokyo, Japan	Decision (Unanimous)	5	3:00
2002-11-28	Loss	(Thailand) Nongbee Kiatyongyut	Rajadamnern Stadium	Bangkok, Thailand	Decision	5	3:00
2002-10-31	Draw	(Thailand) Sakawthong Petchnongnut	Onesongchai Rajadamnern Stadium	Bangkok, Thailand	Decision	5	3:00
2002-09-28	Win	(Thailand) Yodthanu Petchnongnut	Muay Thai World Heritage - Mitsubishi Tournament, Final	Bangkok, Thailand	Decision (Unanimous)	5	3:00
Wins the 2002 Mitsubishi Tournament and the vacant Rajadamnern Stadium Super Featherweight (130 lbs) title.
2002-08-31	Win	(Thailand) Lakhin Sakjawee	Mitsubishi Tournament, Semifinals	Bangkok, Thailand	Decision	5	3:00
2002-06-15	Draw	(Thailand) Yodthanu Daopaedriew	Samrong Stadium	Samut Prakan, Thailand	Decision	5	3:00
2002-05-04	Win	(Thailand) Silaphet Por.Paoin	Samrong Stadium	Samut Prakan, Thailand	Decision	5	3:00
2001-09-06	Win	(Thailand) DaoUdon Por.Yosanan	Rajadamnern Stadium	Bangkok, Thailand	Decision	5	3:00
2000-10-29	Win	(Thailand) Amnuayporn Bor.Kor.Sor.		Chachoengsao province, Thailand	Decision	5	3:00
2000-09-24	Loss	(Thailand) Namphonlek Nongkeepahuyuth		Chachoengsao province, Thailand	Decision	5	3:00
2000-09-10	Win	(Thailand) Kingstar NakornthongParkview	Muay Thai World Heritage	Bangkok, Thailand	Decision (Unanimous)	5	3:00
2000-01-01	Loss	(Thailand) Buakaw Por.Pramuk	Lumpinee Stadium	Bangkok, Thailand	KO (Right elbow)	3	
Legend: Win Loss Draw/No contest Notes

== See also ==
- List of male kickboxers
