= Michał Głogowski (kickboxer) =

- Born: Michał Głogowski; May 25, 1984 (age 42)
- Nationality: Polish
- Height: 1.81 m (5 ft 11 1/2 in)
- Weight: 70 kg (150 lb; 11 st)
- Division: Welterweight
- Style: Kickboxing
- Fighting out of: Siedlce, Poland
- Team: TKKF Siedlce

Kickboxing record
- Total: 27
- Wins: 21
- Losses: 5
- Draws: 1
- Last updated on: June 11, 2011

Michał Głogowski (born May 25, 1984) is a Polish welterweight kickboxer fighting out of Siedlce for TKKF Siedlce. He is the WKN Low Kick World Champion and the K-1 Europe MAX 2008 in Poland runner up.

== Amateur career ==
Głogowski won his first amateur international competition representing Poland at the W.A.K.O. European Championships 2004 in Budva, Montenegro. He defeated all three of his opponents at the championship by decision, to take the gold medal in the 71 kg low kick rules category. The following year he entered the W.A.K.O. World Cup 2005 held in Piacenza, Italy. Głogowski won a silver medal at this event, finishing runner up against compatriot Ziemnicki Przemyslaw in the final of the Light Contact 69 kg category. He also won a silver medal in Low-Kick at the world championships in Agadir, Morocco later in the year.

Over the next couple of years, Głogowski had mixed success on the amateur circuit, suffering the disappointment of a semi final exit (and bronze medal) at the 2006 W.A.K.O. European Championships in Skopje, Macedonia. In 2007, he won a silver medal at World Championships 2007 in Belgrade, Serbia, later bettering it at the European Championships 2008 held in Porto, Portugal by winning gold. This would likely be his last amateur competition as he was increasingly becoming involved on the professional circuit.

== Professional career ==
Głogowski became professional in 2006. That year, he became a world champion by winning the World Kickboxing Network (W.K.N.) Low Kick World title. In 2007, he made his K-1 MAX debut at the K-1 East Europe MAX 2007 held in Vilnius, Lithuania, defeating his opponent, Azerbaijani Agiliar Navruzov, by majority decision in a reserve match.

2008 was a productive year for Głogowski. At the start of the year, he defeated the Portuguese fighter Joao Balbeira in his hometown of Siedlce, Poland to win the W.A.K.O. Pro Intercontinental title. In March he was invited back to fight in K-1 MAX at the K-1 Europe MAX 2008 in Poland, in Warsaw. Głogowski managed to make the final but was defeated by Muay Thai fighter Petr Nakonechnyi. By the end of the year, he reached another final at the TK2 World MAX 2008 in Aix en Provence, France, only to be denied a decision by the judges.

In 2009, Głogowski came back from training in Thailand to defeat Norbert Balogh at the K-1 World Grand Prix 2009 in Łódź by an impressive knockout. He returned to K-1 MAX the following year at the K-1 World Grand Prix 2010 in Warsaw, where he faced former ZST Grand Prix champion and knockout specialist Remigijus Morkevičius. After three hard-fought rounds, the judges scored the fight a draw, despite many in the crowd thinking that Głogowski had edged it. As a result of his performances in K-1 MAX, Głogowski was granted a wildcard slot at the forthcoming K-1 World MAX 2010 Final 16 and managed to qualify for the K-1 World MAX 2010 Final where he lost to eventual finalist Yoshihiro Sato at the quarterfinal stage.

== Titles ==
- Professional:
  - 2008 TK2 World MAX runner up -70 kg
  - 2008 K-1 Europe MAX in Poland runner up
  - 2008 W.A.K.O. Pro Intercontinental Champion -69 kg
  - 2006 World Kickboxing Network Low Kick World Champion
- Amateur:
  - 2008 W.A.K.O. European Championships in Guimarães, Portugal (gold) -71 kg (low-kick)
  - 2007 W.A.K.O. World Championships in Belgrade, Serbia (silver) -71 kg (low-kick)
  - 2006 W.A.K.O. European Championships in Skopje, Macedonia (bronze) -71 kg (low-kick)
  - 2005 W.A.K.O. World Championships in Agadir, Morocco (silver) -71 kg (low-kick)
  - 2005 W.A.K.O. World Cup in Piacenza, Italy (silver) -69 kg (light-contact)
  - 2004 W.A.K.O. European Championships in Budva, Serbia and Montenegro (gold) -71 kg (low-kick)
  - x14 Poland National Kickboxing Champion

== Professional kickboxing record ==
Kickboxing record
21 wins, 5 losses, 1 draw
Date	Result	Opponent	Event	Location	Method	Round	Time
2011-06-11	Loss	(Poland) Rafal Dudek	BFN Group presents: It's Showtime Warsaw	Warsaw, Poland	Extra round decision (split)	4	3:00
2010-11-25	Win	(Latvia) Tomas Mengels	KOK World GP 2010 in Warsaw	Warsaw, Poland	TKO	1	
2010-11-08	Loss	(Japan) Yoshihiro Sato	K-1 World MAX 2010 Final, Quarter Finals	Tokyo, Japan	Decision (unanimous)	3	3:00
2010-10-03	Win	(Thailand) Sagatpetch IngramGym	K-1 World MAX 2010 Final 16 - Part 2	Seoul, South Korea	Ext.R decision (split)	4	3:00
Qualifies for K-1 World MAX 2010 Final.
2010-03-28	Draw	(Lithuania) Remigijus Morkevičius	K-1 World Grand Prix 2010 in Warsaw	Warsaw, Poland	Decision draw	3	3:00
2009-10-29	Loss	(France) Jeremy Sportouch	TK2 World MAX 2009, Semi Finals	Aix en Provence, France	Decision	3	3:00
2009-10-29	Win	(France) Laurent Debono	TK2 World MAX 2009, Quarter Finals	Aix en Provence, France	KO	2	
2009-05-23	Win	(Hungary) Norbert Balogh	K-1 World Grand Prix 2009 in Łódź	Łódź, Poland	KO (left liver shot)	2	0:46
2009-03-30	Win	(Thailand)		Bangkok, Thailand	KO (liver shot)	1	0:30
2008-10-11	Loss	(France) Wallid Haddad	TK2 World MAX 2008, Final	Aix en Provence, France	Decision	3	3:00
Fight was for TK2 World MAX 2008 title -70kg.
2008-10-11	Win	(France) Carlos Tavares	TK2 World MAX 2008, Semi Finals	Aix en Provence, France	Decision	3	3:00
2008-10-11	Win	(France) Abdallah Mabel	TK2 World MAX 2008, Quarter Finals	Aix en Provence, France	Decision	3	3:00
2008-04-06	Loss	(Ukraine) Petr Nakonechnyi	K-1 Europe MAX 2008 in Poland, Final	Warsaw, Poland	Decision (unanimous)	3	3:00
Fight was for K-1 Europe MAX 2008 in Poland title.
2008-04-06	Win	(Russia) Ivan Grigoriev	K-1 Europe MAX 2008 in Poland, Semi Finals	Warsaw, Poland	Decision (majority)	3	3:00
2008-04-06	Win	(Lithuania) Edvardas Norkeliunas	K-1 Europe MAX 2008 in Poland, Quarter Finals	Warsaw, Poland	Decision (unanimous)	3	3:00
2008-01-27	Win	(Portugal) Joao Balbeira	Gala Kickboxing, Siedlce	Siedlce, Poland	KO	2	
Wins W.A.K.O. Pro Intercontinental title -69 kg.
2007-03-17	Win	(Azerbaijan) Agiliar Navruzov	K-1 East Europe MAX 2007, Reserve Fight	Vilnius, Lithuania	Decision (majority)	3	3:00
2006-10-19	Win	(Cyprus) Eftathiosa Benova		Sosnowiec, Poland	Decision (unanimous)	5	3:00
Wins W.K.N. Low Kick World title.
2006-00-00	Win	(Poland) Rafal Dudek		Poland	KO		
Legend: Win Loss Draw/no contest Notes

== Amateur kickboxing record ==
Amateur kickboxing record
Date	Result	Opponent	Event	Location	Method	Round	Time
2008-11-30	Win	(Croatia) Frane Radnić	W.A.K.O. European Championships 2008, Low Kick Final -71 kg	Porto, Portugal	Decision (split)	3	2:00
Wins 2008 W.A.K.O. European Championship Low Kick Gold Medal -71 kg.
2008-11-?	Win	(Russia) Evgeniy Grechishkin	W.A.K.O. European Championships 2008, Low Kick Semi Finals -71 kg	Porto, Portugal	Decision (unanimous)	3	2:00
2008-11-?	Win	(Belarus) Dzmitry Baranau	W.A.K.O. European Championships 2008, Low Kick Quarter Finals -71 kg	Porto, Portugal	Decision (unanimous)	3	2:00
2007-09-30	Loss	(Russia) Konstantin Sbytov	W.A.K.O. World Championships 2007, Low Kick Final -71 kg	Belgrade, Serbia	Decision (split)	3	2:00
Wins 2007 W.A.K.O. World Championship Low Kick Silver Medal -71 kg.
2007-09-?	Win	(France) Paolo Iry	W.A.K.O. World Championships 2007, Low Kick Semi Finals -71 kg	Belgrade, Serbia	Decision (unanimous)	3	2:00
2007-09-?	Win	(Bulgaria) Svetoslav Maleschkov	W.A.K.O. World Championships 2007, Low Kick Quarter Finals -71 kg	Belgrade, Serbia	Decision (unanimous)	3	2:00
2007-09-?	Win	(Greece) Nazarenko Vladimiros	W.A.K.O. World Championships 2007, Low Kick 2nd Round -71 kg	Belgrade, Serbia	Decision (unanimous)	3	2:00
Had bye through to 2nd Round.
2006-11-25	Loss	(Russia) Konstantin Sbytov	W.A.K.O. European Championships 2006, Low Kick Semi Finals -71 kg	Skopje, Macedonia	Decision (unanimous)	3	2:00
Wins 2006 W.A.K.O. European Championship Low Kick Bronze Medal -71 kg.
2006-11-23	Win	(Croatia) Hrvoje Crnic	W.A.K.O. European Championships 2006, Low Kick Quarter Finals -71 kg	Skopje, Macedonia	KO	3	
Had bye through to Quarter Finals.
2005-09-25	Loss	(Russia) Ibragim Tamazaev	W.A.K.O. World Championships 2005, Low-Kick Final -71 kg	Agadir, Morocco			
Wins 2005 W.A.K.O. World Championships Low Kick Silver Medal -71 kg.
2005-06-06	Loss	(Poland) Ziemnicki Przemyslaw	W.A.K.O. Light Contact World Cup 2005, Light Contact Final -69 kg	Piacenza, Italy			
Wins 2005 W.A.K.O. World Cup Light Contact Silver Medal -69 kg.
2004-10-24	Win	(Belarus) Andrey Borodulin	W.A.K.O. European Championships 2004, Low Kick Final -71 kg (Low Kick)	Budva, Montenegro	Decision (unanimous)	3	2:00
Wins 2004 W.A.K.O. European Championship Low Kick Gold Medal -71 kg.
2004-10-?	Win	(Russia) Khizri Saipov	W.A.K.O. European Championships 2004, Low Kick Semi Finals -71 kg	Budva, Montenegro	Decision (unanimous)	3	2:00
2004-10-?	Win	(Italy) Stefano Lonzi	W.A.K.O. European Championships 2004, Low Kick Quarter Finals -71 kg	Budva, Montenegro	Decision (unanimous)	3	2:00
Legend: Win Loss Draw/no contest Notes

== See also ==
- List of K-1 events
- List of K-1 champions
- List of male kickboxers
