= Houcine Bennoui =

French-Algerian Muay Thai kickboxer

- Born: c. 1989; Lyon, France
- Nationality: French Algerian
- Height: 1.78 m (5 ft 10 in)
- Weight: 63.5 kg (140 lb; 10.00 st)
- Division: Light Welterweight
- Style: Muay Thai
- Fighting out of: Lyon - Saint-Fons, France
- Team: Gym boxing St Fons - Team Nasser K.
- Trainer: Nasser Kacem
- Years active: 12 (2001–present)

Kickboxing record
- Total: 55
- Wins: 43
- By knockout: 26
- Losses: 12

Other information
- Notable relatives: Karim Bennoui, brother Abdallah Mabel, Yohan Lidon, Fabio Pinca, Team Nasser K. partners
- Last updated on: March 8, 2014

Houcine Bennoui (born c. 1989) is a French-Algerian Muay Thai kickboxer, younger brother of Karim Bennoui. He is the WFC World Muay Thai Champion.

== Biography and career ==
=== Biography ===
H. Bennoui resides in Lyon, France and trains at Gym boxing St Fons in Lyon, Saint-Fons. His trainer is Nasser Kacem. He is of Algerian heritage.

He begins Muay Thai at the age of 11, with Nasser Kacem who was a teacher in the suburbs of Lyon. His older brother, Karim Bennoui is the It's Showtime 61MAX world Champion -61 kg.

=== Early career ===
Bennoui has had 42 fights for 35 wins (including 25 by knockout) and 7 defeats. In 2008 he became WFC World Muay Thai Champion and in 2011 he won a Muay Thai tournament (65 kg) in Brest, France.

He faced Singmanee Kaewsamrit at Thai Fight: Lyon on September 19, 2012 in Lyon, France, and won via decision after three rounds.

He was scheduled to rematch Damien Alamos at Time Fight 2 in Tours, France, on October 6, 2012 but the fight was cancelled in order for Alamos to face Diesellek Aoodonmuang.

He lost to Adaylton Pareira De Freitas via decision in the quarter-finals of the 2012 Thai Fight 67 kg Tournament at Thai Fight 2012: King of Muay Thai in Bangkok, Thailand on October 23, 2012.

Bennoui was scheduled to compete in the Krush Grand Prix 2013 ~67kg First Class Tournament~ on January 14, 2013 and fight Yuta Kubo in the quarter-finals but he pulled out of the tournament and was replaced by Roman Mailov.

He won by decision over Imwiset Pornnarai in a three-round affair at Yokkao Extreme 2013 in Milan, Italy, on January 26, 2013.

On March 9, 2013, Bennoui lost to Saenchai PKSaenchaimuaythaigym on points at Siam Warriors in Cork, Ireland.

He will fight Kaoponlek in Trieste, Italy, on July 5, 2013.

Bennoui competed at the -65 kg/143 lb Thai Max tournament in Meyreul, France, on October 19, 2013, defeating Somsak by first-round KO in the quarter-finals and Sergio Wielzen by unanimous decision in the semis before losing to Damien Alamos via TKO due to a cut in the final.

He defeated Mehdi Zatout via unanimous decision at La Ligue des Gladiateurs in Paris, France, on January 25, 2014.

Replacing Damien Alamos who withdrew with a hand injury, Bennoui lost to Liam Harrison on points in a five-round -65 kg Muay Thai bout at Yokkao 8 in Bolton, England, on March 8, 2014.

== Titles and achievements ==
- 2014 A1 WGP Tournament Champion -65 kg
- 2013 Thai Max -65 kg/143 lb Tournament Runner-up
- 2011 Explosion Fight Night Volume 03 Tournament Champion (65 kg)
- 2008 WFC World Muaythai Champion (-64 kg)
- 2007 Junior French Muaythai Champion
- 2006 Junior French Muaythai Champion

== Kickboxing record ==
Kickboxing record
43 Wins (26 (T)KO's), 12 Losses
Date	Result	Opponent	Event	Location	Method	Round	Time
2015-10-10	Loss	(France) Eddy Nait Slimani	World GBC Tour 9	Mazan, France	KO	2	
2014-10-23	Win	(France) Alexy Wallace	A1 WCC Lyon, Final	Lyon, France	Decision	3	3:00
Wins A1 WGP Tournament Championship -65 kg.
2014-10-23	Win	(France) Yannick Reine	A1 WCC Lyon, Semi Finals	Lyon, France	Decision	3	3:00
2014-03-08	Loss	(England) Liam Harrison	Yokkao 8	Bolton, England	Decision	5	3:00
2014-01-25	Win	(France) Mehdi Zatout	La Ligue des Gladiateurs	Paris, France	Decision (unanimous)	5	3:00
2013-10-19	Loss	(France) Damien Alamos	Thai Max, Final	Meyreuil, France	TKO (cut)	1	
For the Thai Max -65 kg/143 lb Tournament Championship.
2013-10-19	Win	(Suriname) Sergio Wielzen	Thai Max, Semi Finals	Meyreuil, France	Decision (unanimous)	3	3:00
2013-10-19	Win	(Thailand) Somsak	Thai Max, Quarter Finals	Meyreuil, France	KO	1	
2013-03-09	Loss	(Thailand) Saenchai PKSaenchaimuaythaigym	Siam Warriors	Cork, Ireland	Decision	5	3:00
2013-01-26	Win	(Thailand) Imwiset Pornnarai	Yokkao Extreme 2013	Milan, Italy	Decision (unanimous)	3	3:00
2012-10-23	Loss	(Brazil) Adaylton Pareira De Freitas	Thai Fight 2012: King of Muay Thai, 67 kg Tournament Quarter Finals	Bangkok, Thailand	Decision	3	3:00
2012-09-19	Win	(Thailand) Singmanee Kaewsamrit	Thai Fight: Lyon	Lyon, France	Decision	3	3:00
2012-08-17	Loss	(Thailand) Singmanee Kaewsamrit	Thai Fight 2012 England	Leicester, England	Decision	3	3:00
2012-06-02	Win	(Italy) Manuel Umberti	La Nuit des Challenges 11	Lyon, France	TKO (Gave Up)	2	0:00
2011-12-00	Loss	(Morocco) Soufiane Zridy	Muaythai Gala - WAKO Pro Championship		KO	1	
Fight was for WAKO Pro World Muaythai title (66.800 kg).
2011-09-25	Loss	(South Korea) Dongsu Kim	Thai Fight 2011 67 kg Tournament, Quarter Final	Bangkok, Thailand	KO	2	
2011-06-04	Win	(Thailand) Olan Kaewsamrit	La Nuit des Challenges 10	Lyon, Saint-Fons, France	KO (Lowkick)	2	
2011-05-14	Win	(Morocco) Mosab Amrani	It's Showtime 2011 Lyon	Lyon, France	TKO (Gave Up)	4	
2011-04-02	Win	(France) Charles François	Explosion Fight Night Volume 03, Final	Brest, France	TKO	2	
Wins Muaythai Tournament (65kg).
2011-04-02	Win	(Thailand) Ekapol Juke	Explosion Fight Night Volume 03, Semi Final	Brest, France	KO (Liver Shot)	2	
2011-02-12	Win	(Italy) Alessio Martino	Muaythai Trophy 4	Paris, France	KO (Flying Knee)	1	
2010-10-09	Loss	(Italy) Alessandro Campagna	K-1 Shardana	Sardinia, Italy	TKO	1	
2010-04-10	Loss	(Thailand) Sudsakorn Sor Klinmee	Sherdana K-1 Gala	Sardinia, Italy	Decision	5	3:00
2010-01-30	Loss	(Thailand) Anuwat Kaewsamrit	La Nuit Des Titans, Semi Final	Tours, France	Decision (Unanimous)	3	3:00
2009-11-28	Loss	(Thailand) Samsamut Kiatchongkaow	A-1 World Cup Combat Lyon	Lyon, France	Decision	5	3:00
2009-07-11	Win	(France) Mehdi Zatout	Diamond Fight World Tour 2	Marrakesh, Morocco	TKO (Referee Stoppage)		
2009-05-16	Win	(France) Damien Alamos	Légendes et Guerriers	Toulouse, France	Decision	3	3:00
2009-01-30	Win	(Italy) Riccardo Cumani	Ring-Rules	Milan, Italy	Decision	5	3:00
2009-01-26	Loss	(Thailand) Ekapol Juke	Diamond Fight World Tour	Paris, France	TKO (Referee Stoppage)	2	
Fight was for WFKB World title -63.5 kg.
2009-01-10	Win	(France) Sofiane Derdega	French Muaythai Championships, 1st Round	Paris, France	Decision	5	3:00
2008-10-25	Win	(Cameroon) Bibi Ondua	Le Choc des Best Fighters 1	Asnières-sur-Seine, France	TKO (Doctor Stoppage)	1	
2008-06-14	Win	(Italy) Andrea Casapietra	The King of Muay Thai	Pieve Emanuele, Italy			
Wins L1 Tournament title -64 kg.
2008-	Win	(France) Thomas Adamandopoulos	Kickboxing Gala	Italy	KO		
2008-02-24	Win	(Belgium) Nicola Massa	Tournai L1 Tournament	Tournai, Belgium	Decision	5	3:00
Wins WFC World Muaythai title -64 kg.
2007-02-17	Loss	(France) Mehdi Zatout	La Nuit des Titans	Tours, France	Decision (Unanimous)	5	3:00
0000-00-00	Win	(France) Amadou Ba	Muaythai Gala	France	KO (Highkick)	2	
Legend: Win Loss Draw/No contest Notes

== See also ==
- List of male kickboxers
