= Milorad Gajović =

MMontenegrin boxer

Personal information
- Nationality: (Montenegro) Montenegrin
- Born: July 27, 1974 (age 52) Niksic, Montenegro
Medal record
Men's Boxing
Mediterranean Games
| Gold medal – first place | 2001 Tunis | Heavyweight |

Milorad Gajović (born July 27, 1974) is a Montenegrin amateur boxer who qualified for the 2008 Summer Olympics as a heavyweight. He has also had some success as an amateur kickboxer.

== Boxing career ==
6 -time Jugoslavija Champion, SCG 81 kg, 91 kg Champion of the 2001 Mediterranean Games . 91 kg . Tunisia Winner of World Cup 2000. 81 kg . Russia Bronze medal from the European Championship in 2000 . 81 kg . Tampere 5 place officially at the World Championships 2003. Bangkok in 2007. Chicago 91 kg . The winner of the tournament "Golden Belt" Bucharest 1999 . Winner of the Tournament " golden gong ' Skopje 4 -time winner of the tournament, " Belgrade Winner " in 1997 . conqueror 3 -time winner of the tournament " Golden Glove " The winner of the tournament for the Olympic Games Athens of 2008 Multiple champion C.GORA Participated in the Olympic Games in Beijing 2008. 91kg . He won numerous sports awards He najjbolji boxer FRY, Serbia and Montenegro, Montenegro Team captain of the FRY, Serbia and Montenegro, Montenegro 3 times best athlete in Niksic 2001, 2004, 2007. In 2000, best athlete in Zemun. In 2001, among the top 10 athletes of the FRY Winner of numerous tournaments Participated in five European Championships, three World Championships, two Mediterranean Games and Olympics crown career

== Kickboxing career ==
In 2004 Gajović was called to represent Serbia and Montenegro at the W.A.K.O. European championships held in his home country. He won the gold medal in the Full-Contact kickboxing heavyweight category (91 kg/200.2 lbs), defeating Anatoly Nossyrev in the final by majority decision. In 2006 he went to European Championships in Lisbon, Portugal making the semi-finals and earning a bronze medal for his efforts. A year later he return to Portugal for the world championships, reaching the final but having to make do with a silver medal.

== Professional boxing record ==
| Res. | Record | Opponent | Type | Date | Location |
|---|---|---|---|---|---|
| Win | 3-0 | Sejfula Berisa | TKO | 2009-10-03 | Sport Hall, Budva, Montenegro |
| Win | 2-0 | Jakov Gospic | UD | 2009-07-24 | Bazen Rondo, Budva, Montenegro |
| Win | 1-0 | Janos Somogyi | TKO | 2009-06-20 | Sport Hall Pinki, Belgrade, Serbia |

== Titles ==
Amateur Boxing

- 2001 Mediterranean Games in Tunis, Tunisia (gold) -91 kg
- 2000 European Amateur Boxing Championships in Tampere, Finland (bronze) -81 kg

Amateur Kickboxing

- 2007 W.A.K.O. World Championships in Coimbra, Portugal (silver) -91 kg (Full-Contact)
- 2006 W.A.K.O. European Championships in Lisbon, Portugal (bronze) -91 kg (Full-Contact)
- 2004 W.A.K.O. European Championships 2004 in Budva, Serbia and Montenegro (gold) -91 kg (Full-Contact)
