= W.A.K.O. European Championships 2004 (Budva) =

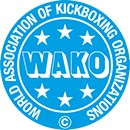
- The poster for W.A.K.O. European Championships 2004 (Budva)
- Promotion: W.A.K.O.
- Date: 19 October (Start); 24 October 2004 (End)
- City: Budva, Serbia and Montenegro

Event chronology
| W.A.K.O. World Championships 2003 (Yalta) | W.A.K.O. European Championships 2004 (Budva) | W.A.K.O. European Championships 2004 (Maribor) |

W.A.K.O. European Championships 2004 in Budva were the joint seventeenth European championships (the other event would be held the next month in Maribor, Slovenia) and were the fourth W.A.K.O. championships (including world) to be held in Serbia and Montenegro/Yugoslavia. The event was open to around 300 amateur men and women from 26 nations from across Europe.

The styles on offer at Budva included; Full-Contact, Low-Kick and Thai-Boxing – with women's Thai-Boxing competitions introduced for the very first time at a W.A.K.O. championships. The other less physical competitions (Light and Semi-Contact, Musical Forms, Aero Kickboxing) would take place at the event in Maribor. By the end of the championships Russia was easily the top nation with a huge medal collection across all styles, hosts Serbia and Montenegro trailed way behind in second and Belarus were in third. The event was held over six days in Budva, Serbia and Montenegro, starting on Tuesday, 19 October and ending on Sunday, 24 October 2004.

== Full-Contact ==
Full-Contact is a form of kickboxing where both punches and kicks are exchanged between participants with full force applied to strikes, and attacks below the waist are prohibited. Most matches are settled either via a point's decision or stoppage victory and all contestants are obliged to wear head and body protection as is customary with most forms of amateur kickboxing. More information on Full-Contact and the rules can be found at the official W.A.K.O. website. At Budva the men had twelve weight divisions ranging from 51 kg/112.2 lbs to over 91 kg/+200.2 lbs, while the women had seven ranging from 48 kg/105.6 lbs to over 70 kg/+143 lbs. Although there was not the same number of high-profile winners in Full-Contact as with previous championships, there were several repeat winners who had won at the last world championships in Paris, with Jere Reinikainen, Igor Kulbaev, Maxim Voronov, Olesya Gladkova and Maria Karlova all winning gold, while Milorad Gajović would go on to compete in the 2008 Olympics as an amateur boxer. By the end of the championships Russia was the strongest nation in the style, winning a huge haul of ten gold, four silvers and four bronze medals across the male and female events.

=== Men's Full-Contact Kickboxing Medals Table ===
| Event | Gold | Silver | Bronze |
|---|---|---|---|
| Light Bantamweight -51 kg | Dmitry Ayzyatulov (Russia) | Ivan Sciolla (Italy) | Srdan Hadrlyanski (Serbia and Montenegro) |
| Bantamweight -54 kg | Zurab Faroyan (Russia) | Tomasz Makowski (Poland) | Filip Exsan (Bulgaria); Gabor Aburko (Hungary) |
| Featherweight -57 kg | Lucien Gross (France) | Boris Klimenko (Russia) | Maurycy Gojko (Poland); Damir Dorts (Belarus) |
| Lightweight -60 kg | Daniel Martins (France) | Mike List (Germany) | Galic Predrag (Serbia and Montenegro); Damian Ławniczak (Poland) |
| Light Welterweight -63 kg | Malik Mangouchi (France) | Vladimir Pykhtin (Russia) | Robert Zytkiewicz (Poland); Biagio Tralli (Italy) |
| Welterweight -67 kg | Jere Reinikainen (Finland) | Roman Pijouk (Russia) | Edmond Mebenga (France); Sinisa Vladimirovic (Serbia and Montenegro) |
| Light Middleweight -71 kg | Igor Kulbaev (Russia) | Robert Arvai (Hungary) | Mariusz Ziętek (Poland); Ahmed Kouranfal (France) |
| Middleweight -75 kg | Konstantin Beloussov (Russia) | Markus Hakulinen (Finland) | Martin Milov (Bulgaria); Frank Witte (Germany) |
| Light Heavyweight -81 kg | Maxim Voronov (Russia) | Bogumil Polonski (Poland) | Hannes Perk (Estonia); Patrik Sjöstrand (Sweden) |
| Cruiserweight -86 kg | Slobodan Marinkovic (Serbia and Montenegro) | Robert Paulsbyen (Norway) | Gamzat Islamagomedov (Russia); Piotr Walczak (Poland) |
| Heavyweight -91 kg | Milorad Gajović (Serbia and Montenegro) | Anatoly Nossyrev (Russia) | Balazs Varga (Hungary); Andreas Hampel (Germany) |
| Super Heavyweight +91 kg | Duško Basrak (Serbia and Montenegro) | Michal Wszelak (Poland) | Mikhail Shvoev (Russia); Jukka Saarinen (Finland) |

=== Women's Full-Contact Kickboxing Medals Table ===
| Event | Gold | Silver | Bronze |
|---|---|---|---|
| Bantamweight -48 kg | Olesya Gladkova (Russia) | Veronique Legras (France) | Jenny Hardengz (Sweden); Annika Pitkänen (Finland) |
| Featherweight -52 kg | Mette Solli (Norway) | Fatma Akyüz (Germany) | Lidia Andreeva (Russia); Tatiana Rinaldi (Italy) |
| Lightweight -56 kg | Sveta Kulakova (Russia) | Zsuzsanna Szuknai (Hungary) | Jutta Nordberg (Finland); Natalie Kalinowski (Germany) |
| Middleweight -60 kg | Cindy Orain (France) | Nadine Lemke (Germany) | Monika Florek (Poland); Vera Avdeeva (Russia) |
| Light Heavyweight -65 kg | Maria Karlova (Russia) | Marija Ristovic (Serbia and Montenegro) | Katalin Csehi (Hungary); Anne Katas (Finland) |
| Heavyweight -70 kg | Julia Chernenko (Russia) | Karolina Lukasik (Poland) | Pierina Guerreri (Italy); Jelena Duric (Serbia and Montenegro) |
| Super Heavyweight +70 kg | Galina Ivanova (Russia) | Daniela Lazzareska (North Macedonia) | Caroline Ek (Sweden) |

== Low-Kick ==
Similar to Full-Contact kickboxing, contestants in Low-Kick are allowed to kick and punch one another with full force, with the primary difference being that in Low-Kick they are also allowed to kick one another's legs, with matches typically won by decision or stoppage. As with other forms of amateur kickboxing, various head and body protection must be worn. More information on the style can be found at the W.A.K.O. website. Both men and women took part in Low-Kick at Budva, with the men having twelve weight divisions ranging from 51 kg/112.2 lbs to over 91 kg/+200.2 lbs, and then women having six ranging from 48 kg/105.6 lbs to 70 kg/154 lbs. Notable winners included future K-1 fighters Michał Głogowski and Łukasz Jarosz, while Dejan Milosavljevic had also won gold at the last European championships in Jesolo. By the end of the event, as with Full-Contact Russia were easily the strongest nation in Low-Kick, winning a massive ten gold, six silver and two bronze medals across the various male and female competitions.

=== Men's Low-Kick Kickboxing Medals Table ===
| Event | Gold | Silver | Bronze |
|---|---|---|---|
| Light Bantamweight -51 kg | Ivan Bityutskikh (Russia) | Maksim Tulai (Belarus) | Ante Juricev Sudac (Croatia) |
| Bantamweight -54 kg | Alexander Sidorov (Moldova) | Ayup Arsaev (Russia) | Boban Marinkovic (Serbia and Montenegro); Dzmitry Baranau (Belarus) |
| Featherweight -57 kg | Ruslan Tozliyan (Russia) | Mariusz Cieśliński (Poland) | Milos Ahic (Serbia and Montenegro); Gabor Kiss (Hungary) |
| Lightweight -60 kg | Artur Tozliyan (Russia) | Michal Tomczykowski (Poland) | Tihomir Iliev (Bulgaria); Mario Donnarumma (Italy) |
| Light Welterweight -63 kg | Gosan Ibragimov (Russia) | Milan Dragojlovic (Serbia and Montenegro) | Soki Andros (Hungary); Toma Tomov (Bulgaria) |
| Welterweight -67 kg | Ibragim Tamazaev (Russia) | No silver medallist | Frand Seyed Morteza (Iran); Eldin Raonic (Bosnia and Herzegovina) |
| Light Middleweight -71 kg | Michał Głogowski (Poland) | Andrey Borodulin (Belarus) | Ile Risteski (North Macedonia); Khizri Saipov (Russia) |
| Middleweight -75 kg | Dmitri Krasichkov (Russia) | Fouad Ezbiri (France) | Stefano Paone (Italy); Vesko Dukic (Serbia and Montenegro) |
| Light Heavyweight -81 kg | Drazenko Ninic (Bosnia and Herzegovina) | Mikhail Chalykn (Russia) | Teppo Laine (Finland); Dénes Racz (Hungary) |
| Cruiserweight -86 kg | Goran Radonic (Serbia and Montenegro) | Alexandr Poydunov (Russia) | Umberto Lucci (Italy); Yurij Aorohin (Moldova) |
| Heavyweight -91 kg | Dejan Milosavljevic (Serbia and Montenegro) | Anatoly Borozna (Russia) | Kresimir Marasovic (Croatia) |
| Super Heavyweight +91 kg | Łukasz Jarosz (Poland) | Daniele Petroni (Italy) | Dragan Jovanovic (Serbia and Montenegro); Ruslan Bisaev (Russia) |

=== Women's Low-Kick Kickboxing Medals Table ===
| Event | Gold | Silver | Bronze |
|---|---|---|---|
| Bantamweight -48 kg | Raisa Akulova (Russia) | Dragana Zanini (Serbia and Montenegro) | Nikolett Simon (Hungary) |
| Featherweight -52 kg | Maria Krivoshapkina (Russia) | Rita De Angelis (Italy) | Reka Krempf (Hungary) |
| Lightweight -56 kg | Barbara Plazzoli (Italy) | Goranka Blagojevic (Serbia and Montenegro) | Tereze Lindberg (Sweden) |
| Middleweight -60 kg | Julia Nemtsova (Russia) | Sanja Ilic (Serbia and Montenegro) | No bronze medallists recorded |
| Light Heavyweight -65 kg | Lopatina Lyubov (Russia) | Maria Domenica Mandolini (Italy) | Ana Mandic (Croatia) |
| Heavyweight -70 kg | Radic Nives (Croatia) | Andreeva Svetlana (Russia) | Olivera Milanovic (Serbia and Montenegro) |

== Thai-Boxing ==
The most physical type of kickboxing available at Budva, Thai-Boxing (more commonly known as Muay Thai allows the participants to kick, punch, use elbows and knees to score points, often resulting in a stoppage victory. As with other forms of amateur kickboxing all contestants must wear head and body protection. At Budva both men and women took part in their own Thai-Boxing competitions with women competing for the first time at a W.A.K.O. championships. The men had twelve weight classes ranging from 51 kg/112.2 lbs to over 91 kg/+200.2 lbs, while the women had just the two, the 51 kg/114.4 lbs and 65 kg/143 lbs divisions. There were not many recognisable names on the winners list at Budva although future pro world champion and K-1 contestant Magomed Magomedov and emerging talent Andrei Kotsur picked up gold medals. By the end of the championships Belarus were once more the strongest nation in Thai-Boxing with six gold, two silver and two bronze medals.

=== Men's Thai-Boxing Medals Table ===
| Event | Gold | Silver | Bronze |
|---|---|---|---|
| Light Bantamweight -51 kg | Giampiero Marceddu (Italy) | Dragan Durmić (Serbia and Montenegro) | No bronze medalists recorded |
| Bantamweight -54 kg | Pavel Pekarchik (Belarus) | Karoly Kiss (Hungary) | Mokhmad Betmirzaev (Russia); Aleksandar Gogic (Serbia and Montenegro) |
| Featherweight -57 kg | Denis Varaksa (Belarus) | Zakhar Roumiantsen (Russia) | Sasa Pandelovic (Serbia and Montenegro) |
| Lightweight -60 kg | Siarhei Budo (Belarus) | Stanislav Ushakov (Russia) | Aleksandar Jankovic (Serbia and Montenegro); Vahidin Tufekcic (Bosnia and Herzegovina) |
| Light Welterweight -63 kg | Andrei Kotsur (Belarus) | Philip Billides (Cyprus) | Michele Iezzi (Italy); József Vulics (Hungary) |
| Welterweight -67 kg | Vadzim Mazanik (Belarus) | Aidenar Huidarbekov (Russia) | Nebojsa Denic (Serbia and Montenegro); Roland Vörös (Hungary) |
| Light Middleweight -71 kg | Shamil Gaydarbekov (Russia) | Frane Radnić (Croatia) | Vitali Astrouski (Belarus); Mark Ohi (Hungary) |
| Middleweight -75 kg | Krasimir Dimov (Bulgaria) | Kiryl Astraukhan (Belarus) | Marco Mastrorocco (Italy); Islam Tsomaev (Russia) |
| Light Heavyweight -81 kg | Magomed Magomedov (Russia) | Salvatore Abate (Italy) | Aliaksandr Vlasuk (Belarus); Aleksandar Maric (Serbia and Montenegro) |
| Cruiserweight -86 kg | Yauhen Anhalevich (Belarus) | Osman Valabov (Russia) | Misa Baculov (Serbia and Montenegro); Igor Jurković (Croatia) |
| Heavyweight -91 kg | Djamal Kasumov (Russia) | Aliaksei Kudzin (Belarus) | Sasa Cirovic (Serbia and Montenegro); Valentino Venturini (Croatia) |
| Super Heavyweight +91 kg | Mirko Vlahovic (Serbia and Montenegro) | Tibor Nagy (Hungary) | Tunbouski Kosta (North Macedonia); Tomica Paladin (Croatia) |

=== Women's Thai-Boxing Medals Table ===
| Event | Gold | Silver | Bronze |
|---|---|---|---|
| Featherweight -52 kg | Ekaterina Dumbrava (Russia) | Milena Dincic (Serbia and Montenegro) | No bronze medalists recorded |
| Light Heavyweight -65 kg | Nadine Dinkler (Germany) | Olga Kokorina (Russia) | Milanka Kragovic (Serbia and Montenegro) |

== Overall Medals Standing (Top 5) ==
| Ranking | Country | Gold (gold) | Silver (silver) | Bronze (bronze) |
|---|---|---|---|---|
| 1 | Russia | 24 | 15 | 8 |
| 2 | Serbia and Montenegro | 6 | 7 | 17 |
| 3 | Belarus | 6 | 4 | 4 |
| 4 | France | 4 | 2 | 6 |
| 5 | Italy | 2 | 5 | 8 |

== See also ==
- List of WAKO Amateur European Championships
- List of WAKO Amateur World Championships
