= Klairung Sor.Chaicharoen =

Thai professional Muay Thai fighter

- Born: Ekachai Chaijaroen; July 24, 1981 (age 45); Tha Sala district, Nakhon Si Thammarat province, Thailand
- Other names: Klairung Sor.SasipaGym (ใกล้รุ่ง ศ.ศศิภายิม)
- Nickname: The Knee to the Head Fighter (ขุนเข่าหัวชนฝา)
- Division: Light Flyweight; Flyweight; Super Flyweight; Bantamweight; Super Bantamweight; Featherweight
- Style: Muay Thai; Muay Khao
- Stance: Orthodox
- Team: Chaicharoen
- Trainer: Bangsarn Sor.Chaicharoen

Ekachai Chaichaoren (Thai: นายเอกชัย ชัยเจริญ; born 24 July 1981), known professionally as Klairung Sor.Chaicharoen (Thai: ใกล้รุ่ง ส.ชัยเจริญ), is a retired Thai professional Muay Thai fighter.

== Biography and career ==
Chaicharoen started training in Muay Thai at the age of 9 with his uncle Bangsarn Sor.Chaicharoen. He trained for two months before having his first fight under the ring name Klairung Sor.Chaicharoen which he got when he replaced a teammate named Klairung on short notice. He competed in his hometown of Tha Sala district and later in various southern provinces until he was scouted by the Onesongchai promotion in 1995.

He slowly gained recognition weighing only 45 kg at the time while fighting at Samrong Stadium, Channel 5 and the Chachoengsao International Stadium before eventually graduating to the Rajadamnern Stadium. Promoter Songchai continuously gave Klairung fights, however, his fight style was considered limited at first as he only focused on clinching but as he kept improving he became one of the most dominant knee fighter (Muay Khao) of the Bangkok circuit entering 2001.

During his career Klairung faced many notable champions of his era such as Ronnachai Naratreekul, Thongchai Tor.Silachai, Bovy Sor Udomson, Saenchai Sor.Kingstar, Phet-Ek Sitjaopho, Wuttidet Lukprabat, Attachai Fairtex, Kem Sor.Ploenchit or Singdam Kiatmuu9.

In 2002 Klairung won nine out of ten fights. For his accomplishments during the year he received the Sports Authority of Thailand Fighter of the Year award.

After retiring from competition, Klairung became a trainer at the Chaicharoen camp in his native Nakhon Si Thammarat province.

== Titles and accomplishments ==
- Professional Boxing Association of Thailand (PAT)
  - 2003 Thailand Super Bantamweight (122 lbs) Champion

Awards

- 2002 Sports Authority of Thailand Fighter of the Year

== Fight record ==
Muay Thai record
| Date | Result | Opponent | Event | Location | Method | Round | Time |
|---|---|---|---|---|---|---|---|
| 2008-05-22 | Win | (Thailand) Suahwallek Chor.Sophipong | Kiatyongyut, Rajadamnern Stadium | Bangkok, Thailand | Decision | 5 | 3:00 |
| 2006-12-28 | Loss | (Thailand) Wattanasak Lukkanthara | Phettongkam, Rajadamnern Stadium | Bangkok, Thailand | KO | 3 | |
| 2006-09-25 | Win | (Thailand) Kriengkrai Tor.Silachai | Onesongchai, Rajadamnern Stadium | Bangkok, Thailand | Decision | 5 | 3:00 |
| 2006-05-29 | Loss | (Thailand) Danchai Tor.Silachai | Onseongchai, Rajadamnern Stadium | Bangkok, Thailand | KO | 3 | |
| 2006-02-03 | Loss | (Thailand) Suahwallek Chor.Sophipong | Phetburapha, Lumpinee Stadium | Bangkok, Thailand | TKO | 1 | |
| 2005-12-23 | Loss | (Thailand) Lohngern Pitakkruchaidan | Phetsupaphan, Lumpinee Stadium | Bangkok, Thailand | Decision | 5 | 3:00 |
| 2005-11-16 | Loss | (Thailand) Pettawee Sor Kittichai | Onesongchai, Rajadamnern Stadium | Bangkok, Thailand | Decision | 5 | 3:00 |
| 2005-09-12 | Loss | (Thailand) Sarawut Lukbanyai | Onesongchai, Lumpinee Stadium | Bangkok, Thailand | KO | 3 | |
| 2005-08-05 | Win | (Thailand) Sinchainoi Sor.Kittichai | Praianan, Rajadamnern Stadium | Bangkok, Thailand | Decision | 5 | 3:00 |
| 2005-06-22 | Loss | (Thailand) Saenchernglek Jirakriangkrai | Kiatsingnoi, Rajadamnern Stadium | Bangkok, Thailand | TKO | 1 | |
| 2005-05-20 | Loss | (Thailand) Saenchernglek Jirakriangkrai | Daorungchujaroen, Rajadamnern Stadium | Bangkok, Thailand | Decision | 5 | 3:00 |
| 2005-05-07 | Win | (Thailand) Fahsuchon Sit-O | Omnoi Stadium | Samut Sakhon, Thailand | Decision | 5 | 3:00 |
| 2005-03-25 | Win | (Thailand) Kongprai Chor.Phaili | Phetsupapahan, Lumpinee Stadium | Bangkok, Thailand | Decision | 5 | 3:00 |
| 2005-02-12 | Loss | (Thailand) Teelak Nor.Siripeung | Onesongchai, Tsunami Charity Event | Thailand | Decision | 5 | 3:00 |
| 2004-12-29 | Loss | (Thailand) Attachai Fairtex | Onseongchai, Rajadamnern Stadium | Bangkok, Thailand | KO (Punches) | 2 | |
| 2004-09-02 | Win | (Thailand) Rungrawee 13 RianExpress | Onesongchai, Rajadamnern Stadium | Bangkok, Thailand | Decision | 5 | 3:00 |
| 2004-06-03 | Win | (Thailand) Rungrawee 13 RianExpress | Onesongchai, Rajadamnern Stadium | Bangkok, Thailand | Decision | 5 | 3:00 |
| 2004-04-08 | Loss | (Thailand) Puja Sor.Suwanee | Onesongchai, Rajadamnern Stadium | Bangkok, Thailand | Decision | 5 | 3:00 |
| 2004-03-04 | Win | (Thailand) Suahwallek Chor.Sophipong | Songchai Birthday, Rajadamnern Stadium | Bangkok, Thailand | Decision | 5 | 3:00 |
| 2003-11-13 | Win | (Thailand) Yodtheera Sityodthong | Onesongchai, Rajadamnern Stadium | Bangkok, Thailand | Decision | 5 | 3:00 |
| 2003-10-05 | Loss | (Thailand) Bovy Sor Udomson | Onesongchai, Rajadamnern Stadium | Bangkok, Thailand | Decision | 5 | 3:00 |
| 2003-08-07 | Win | (Thailand) Khunpinit Kiattawan | Onesongchai, Rajadamnern Stadium | Bangkok, Thailand | KO (High kick) | 4 | |
| 2003-06-23 | Loss | (Thailand) Singdam Kiatmuu9 | OneSongchai + Petchthongdam, Rajadamnern Stadium | Bangkok, Thailand | Decision | 5 | 3:00 |
| 2003-04-26 | Loss | (Thailand) Sayannoi Kiatprapat | OneSongchai, Wat Laem Tai | Chachoengsao, Thailand | Decision | 5 | 3:00 |
| 2003- | Win | (Thailand) Kem Sor.Ploenchit | | Bangkok, Thailand | Decision | 5 | 3:00 |
Wins the Thailand Super Bantamweight (122 lbs) title.
| 2002-12-23 | Win | (Thailand) Wuttidet Lukprabat | Onesongchai, Rajadamnern Stadium | Bangkok, Thailand | Decision | 5 | 3:00 |
| 2002-11-04 | Loss | (Thailand) Saenchai Sor.Kingstar | | Bangkok, Thailand | Decision | 5 | 3:00 |
| 2002-10-09 | Win | (Thailand) Phet-Ek Sitjaopho | Onesongchai, Rajadamnern Stadium | Bangkok, Thailand | Decision | 5 | 3:00 |
| 2002-09-09 | Win | (Thailand) Saenchai Sor.Kingstar | | Bangkok, Thailand | Decision | 5 | 3:00 |
| 2002-08-07 | Win | (Thailand) Phettho Sitjaopho | Onesongchai, Rajadamnern Stadium | Bangkok, Thailand | Decision | 5 | 3:00 |
| 2002-07-09 | Win | (Thailand) Sayannoi Kiatprapat | Phetsupaphan, Lumpinee Stadium | Bangkok, Thailand | Decision | 5 | 3:00 |
| 2002-04-22 | Win | (Thailand) Bovy Sor Udomson | Rajadamnern Stadium | Bangkok, Thailand | Decision | 5 | 3:00 |
| 2002-03-25 | Win | (Thailand) Thongchai Tor.Silachai | Rajadamnern Stadium | Bangkok, Thailand | Decision | 5 | 3:00 |
| 2002-03-04 | Win | (Thailand) Ronnachai Naratreekul | Onesongchai, Lumpinee Stadium | Bangkok, Thailand | Decision | 5 | 3:00 |
| 2002-01-14 | Win | (Thailand) Ronnachai Naratreekul | Wan Muay Thai + Onesongchai, Lumpinee Stadium | Bangkok, Thailand | Decision | 5 | 3:00 |
| 2001-12-19 | Loss | (Thailand) Michael Sor.Sakulpan | Onesongchai, Lumpinee Stadium | Bangkok, Thailand | Decision | 5 | 3:00 |
| 2001-04-29 | Loss | (Thailand) Michael Sor.Sakulpan | Bangkae Mall | Bangkok, Thailand | Decision | 5 | 3:00 |
| 2001-02-22 | Loss | (Thailand) Thongchai Tor.Silachai | Rajadamnern Stadium | Bangkok, Thailand | TKO (Punch) | 4 | |
For the vacant WMC World Super Flyweight (115 lbs) title.
| 2000- | Win | (Thailand) Michael Sor.Sakulpan | | Bangkok, Thailand | Decision | 5 | 3:00 |
| 2000-06-03 | Loss | (Thailand) Terdthailek NakornthongParkview | Onesongchai, Lumpinee Stadium | Bangkok, Thailand | Decision | 5 | 3:00 |
| 2000-04-14 | Win | (Thailand) Saenkom Sakphanu | Fairtex, Lumpinee Stadium | Bangkok, Thailand | Decision | 5 | 3:00 |
| 2000-01-15 | Win | (Thailand) Kongkiat Sitthichunthong | Onesongchai, Lumpinee Stadium | Bangkok, Thailand | Decision | 5 | 3:00 |
| 1999-11-08 | Loss | (Thailand) Pornsawan Porpramook | Chaomuangchon, Rajadamnern Stadium | Bangkok, Thailand | Decision | 5 | 3:00 |
| 1999-10-17 | Win | (Thailand) Sakawut Kiattawan | | Chachoengsao, Thailand | Decision | 5 | 3:00 |
| 1999-03-14 | Loss | (Thailand) Phetto Sitjaopho | Samrong Stadium | Samut Prakan, Thailand | Decision | 5 | 3:00 |
| 1999-02-10 | | (Thailand) Wanmeechai Meenayothin | Daorung Sor.Wanchat, Rajadamnern Stadium | Bangkok, Thailand | | | |
| 1998-08-15 | Loss | (Thailand) Rungrit Sitchamlong | Lumpinee Stadium | Bangkok, Thailand | Decision | 5 | 3:00 |
Legend: Win Loss Draw/No contest Notes

== See also ==
- List of male kickboxers
