= Thongchai Tor.Silachai =

Thai former professional Muay Thai fighter

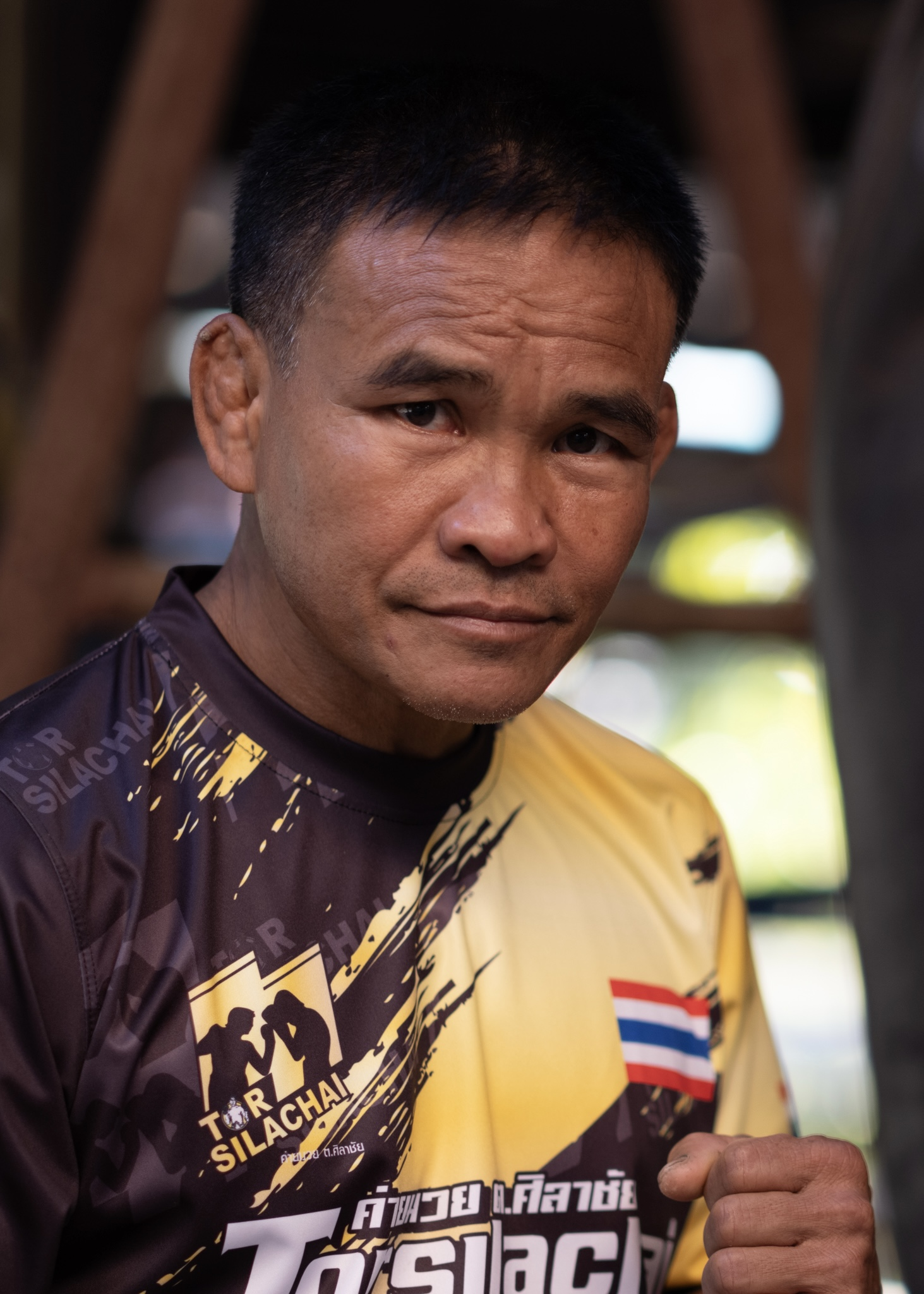
- Thongchai in 2024
- Born: Thongchai Pakthai; February 8, 1971 (age 55); Chakkarat, Nakhon Ratchasima, Thailand
- Native name: ธงชัย ปักษ์ใต้
- Nickname: Great Stone (มหาหิน)
- Height: 161 cm (5 ft 3 in)
- Division: Mini Flyweight; Light Flyweight; Flyweight; Super Flyweight; Bantamweight
- Style: Muay Thai (Muay Bouk)
- Stance: Orthodox
- Team: Tor.Silachai Gym
- Trainer: Ajarn Metprik
- Years active: c. 1981–2011

Thongchai Pakthai (Thai: ธงชัย ปักษ์ใต้; born February 8, 1971), known professionally as Thongchai Tor.Silachai (Thai: ธงชัย ต.ศิลาชัย), is a Thai former professional Muay Thai fighter. He is a former five-time Lumpinee Stadium champion and one-time Rajadamnern Stadium champion across four divisions, as well as the 2001 Sports Writers Association of Thailand Fighter of the Year, who was famous during the 1990s and 2000s.

He also holds the distinction of being the only fighter to have defeated the legendary Saenchai in Muay Thai rules by knockout.

== Biography and career ==
Thongchai Pakthai was born on February 8, 1971 in Chakkarat, Nakhon Ratchasima, Thailand. He started fighting at the age of 10.

He trained at the famous Tor.Silachai gym for his entire career, under the great Medprik Tor.Silachai, a former Lumpinee Stadium Champion in the 1960s, and owner of the gym.

Thongchai fought under legendary promoter Songchai Rattanasuban's OneSongchai promotion for his entire stadium career, totaling well over 20 years. At the peak of his career, he had a purse of ฿180,000 baht.

In 1998, he received his first Fighter of the Year award from the Sports Authority of Thailand. In 2001, Thongchai had gone 10-2, with notable wins over Bovy Sor.Udomson, Pornsanae Sitmonchai, Klairung Sor.Chaicharoen, and Sayannoi Kiatprapat. As such, Thongchai won both the Sports Authority and Sports Writers Association of Thailand Fighter of the Year award. He was 30 years old when he received this award, making him the oldest recipient in the award's history.

Throughout the course of his long career, he has fought many great champions such as Saenchai, Anuwat Kaewsamrit, Samson Isaan, Lamnamoon Sor.Sumalee, Nungubon Sitlerchai, Namsaknoi Yudthagarngamtorn, Kaolan Kaovichit, Phet-Ek Sitjaopho, Chainoi Muangsurin, Tukatathong Por.Pongsawang, Pairojnoi Sor.Siamchai, Petch Tor.BangSaen, Pornsanae Sitmonchai, Wuttidet Lukprabat, Pakorn P.K. Saenchai Muaythaigym, Bovy Sor.Udomson, Orono Wor.Petchpun, Panomroonglek Kiatmuu9, and more.

== Titles and accomplishments ==
- Lumpinee Stadium
  - 1990 Lumpinee Stadium Mini Flyweight (105 lbs) Champion
    - One successful title defense
  - 1991 Lumpinee Stadium Light Flyweight (108 lbs) Champion
  - 1993 Lumpinee Stadium Flyweight (112 lbs) Champion
    - Two successful title defenses
  - 1998 Lumpinee Stadium Super Flyweight (115 lbs) Champion
- Rajadamnern Stadium
  - 2001 Rajadamnern Stadium Super Flyweight (115 lbs) Champion
    - One successful title defense
  - 2001 Rajadamnern Stadium Fighter of the Year
- World Muay Thai Council
  - 1996 WMC World Super Flyweight (115 lbs) Champion
  - 2001 WMC World Super Flyweight (115 lbs) Champion
    - One successful title defense
  - 2003 WMC World Super Flyweight (115 lbs) Champion
- Other
  - 2007 Mitsubishi Triton Tournament Winner

Awards

- 1998 Sports Authority of Thailand Fighter of the Year
- 2001 Sports Authority of Thailand Fighter of the Year
- 2001 Sports Writers Association of Thailand Fighter of the Year

== Fight record ==
Muay Thai Record
Date	Result	Opponent	Event	Location	Method	Round	Time
2009-09-10	Loss	(Thailand) Kaimukkao Por.Thairongruangkamai	Phettongkam, Rajadamnern Stadium	Bangkok, Thailand	Decision	5	3:00
2009-08-06	Loss	(Thailand) Luknimit Singklongsi	Rajadamnern Stadium	Bangkok, Thailand	TKO (Cut)	4	
2009-07-03	Loss	(Thailand) Kangwanlek Petchyindee	Lumpinee Stadium	Bangkok, Thailand	Decision	5	3:00
2009-06-08	Win	(Thailand) Phonsawan Sakhiranchai	Rajadamnern Stadium	Bangkok, Thailand	Decision	5	3:00
2008-11-27	Loss	(Thailand) Pakorn P.K.Saenchaimuaythaigym	Rajadamnern Stadium	Bangkok, Thailand	Decision	5	3:00
2008-11-06	Win	(Thailand) Kaimukkao Por.Thairongruangkamai	Rajadamnern Stadium	Bangkok, Thailand	Decision	5	3:00
2008-10-09	Win	(Thailand) Denmoo9 Sunkilahuaitom	Onesongchai, Rajadamnern Stadium	Bangkok, Thailand	Decision	5	3:00
2008-05-08	Loss	(Thailand) Daoden Singklongsi	Onesongchai, Rajadamnern Stadium	Bangkok, Thailand	Decision	5	3:00
2008-04-10	Loss	(Thailand) Luknimit Singklongsi	Rajadamnern Stadium	Bangkok, Thailand	Decision	5	3:00
2008-02-07	Win	(Thailand) Detsuriya Sittiprasert	Rajadamnern Stadium	Bangkok, Thailand	Decision	5	3:00
2007-12-19	Win	(Thailand) Khaimookdam Sit-O	Rajadamnern Stadium	Bangkok, Thailand	Decision	5	3:00
2007-11-12	Loss	(Thailand) Khaimookdam Sit-O	Onesongchai, Rajadamnern Stadium	Bangkok, Thailand	Decision	5	3:00
2007-10-30	Win	(Thailand) Luknimit Singklongsi	Rajadamnern Stadium	Bangkok, Thailand	Decision	5	3:00
2007-10-04	Win	(Thailand) Luknimit Singklongsi	Onesongchai, Rajadamnern Stadium	Bangkok, Thailand	Decision	5	3:00
2007-08-30	Win	(Thailand) Thaweesak Singklongsi	Rajadamnern Stadium	Bangkok, Thailand	Decision	5	3:00
2007-07-16	Loss	(Thailand) Phornomngkol Sakhiranchai	Onesongchai, Rajadamnern Stadium	Bangkok, Thailand	Decision	5	3:00
2007-06-25	Loss	(Thailand) Rittijak Kaewsamrit	Onesongchai, Rajadamnern Stadium	Bangkok, Thailand	Decision	5	3:00
For the vacant S1 and WMC World Bantamweight (118 lbs) titles.
2007-05-12	Win	(Thailand) Rittijak Kaewsamrit	Rajadamnern Stadium - Mitsubishi Triton Tournament, Final	Bangkok, Thailand	Decision	5	3:00
Wins the 11th Mitsubishi Triton Tournament.
2007-	Win	(Thailand) Phaendin Sor.Damrongrit	Rajadamnern Stadium - Mitsubishi Triton Tournament, Semifinals	Bangkok, Thailand	Decision	5	3:00
2007-	Loss	(Thailand) Chatchainoi GardenSeaview	Rajadamnern Stadium - Mitsubishi Triton Tournament Group Stage	Bangkok, Thailand	Decision	5	3:00
2007-03-08	Win	(Thailand) Manasak Narupai	Rajadamnern Stadium	Bangkok, Thailand	Decision	5	3:00
2007-	Win	(Thailand) Phaendin Sor.Damrongrit	Rajadamnern Stadium - Mitsubishi Triton Tournament Group Stage	Bangkok, Thailand	Decision	5	3:00
2007-	Win	(Thailand) Payakseua Gardenseaview	Rajadamnern Stadium - Mitsubishi Triton Tournament Group Stage	Bangkok, Thailand	Decision	5	3:00
2006-10-28	Win	(Thailand) Payakseua Gardenseaview	Onesongchai -	Bangkok, Thailand	Decision	5	3:00
2006-09-25	Loss	(Thailand) Payakseua Gardenseaview	Rajadamnern Stadium	Bangkok, Thailand	Decision	5	3:00
2006-08-14	Loss	(Thailand) Chatchainoi GardenSeaview	Rajadamnern Stadium	Bangkok, Thailand	Decision	5	3:00
2006-07-05	Win	(Thailand) Detnarong Sitjaboon	Rajadamnern Stadium	Bangkok, Thailand	Decision	5	3:00
2006-03-06	Win	(Thailand) Ponmongkhol Sakhiranchai	Rajadamnern Stadium	Bangkok, Thailand	TKO	4	
2006-01-30	Loss	(Thailand) Phandin Sor.Dumrongrit	Rajadamnern Stadium	Bangkok, Thailand	Decision	5	3:00
2005-12-22	Loss	(Thailand) Daoden Singklongsi	Onesongchai, Rajadamnern Stadium	Bangkok, Thailand	Decision	5	3:00
2005-10-06	Loss	(Thailand) Rungruanglek Lukprabat	Rajadamnern Stadium	Bangkok, Thailand	Decision	5	3:00
2005-09-15	Loss	(Thailand) Pornsanae Sitmonchai	Rajadamnern Stadium	Bangkok, Thailand	Decision	5	3:00
2005-08-12	Loss	(Thailand) Anuwat Kaewsamrit	Queens Birthday Superfights, Sanam Luang	Bangkok, Thailand	Decision (Unanimous)	5	3:00
2005-06-22	Win	(Thailand) Tubnar Sitromsai	Rajadamnern Stadium	Bangkok, Thailand	Decision	5	3:00
2005-03-14	Loss	(Thailand) Phetek Kiatyongyut	Rajadamnern Stadium	Bangkok, Thailand	Decision	5	3:00
2005-02-14	Win	(Thailand) Seuahuanlek Kor.Sopipong	Rajadamnern Stadium	Bangkok, Thailand	Decision	5	3:00
2005-01-05	Win	(Thailand) Phetmanee Phetsupaphan	Rajadamnern Stadium	Bangkok, Thailand	Decision	5	3:00
2004-12-06	Win	(Thailand) Orono Muangsima	Rajadamnern Stadium	Bangkok, Thailand	TKO	2	
2004-11-11	Win	(Thailand) Pornsanae Sitmonchai	Rajadamnern Stadium	Bangkok, Thailand	Decision	5	3:00
2004-10-14	Win	(Thailand) Thapna Sitromsai	Onesongchai, Rajadamnern Stadium	Bangkok, Thailand	Decision (Unanimous)	5	3:00
2004-09-02	Loss	(Thailand) Dennaklang Sor.Weerapan	Rajadamnern Stadium	Bangkok, Thailand	Decision	5	3:00
2004-07-18	Loss	(Thailand) Panomrunglek Kiatmuu9		Thailand	Decision	5	3:00
2004-06-03	Win	(Thailand) Kwanpichit 13Coinsexpress	Rajadamnern Stadium	Bangkok, Thailand	KO	3	
2004-04-08	Win	(Thailand) Payakseua Sor.Hengjaroen	Rajadamnern Stadium	Bangkok, Thailand	Decision	5	3:00
2004-02-18	Loss	(Thailand) Kwanpichit 13Coinsexpress	Rajadamnern Stadium	Bangkok, Thailand	Decision	5	3:00
2003-11-27	Loss	(Thailand) Chatchainoi Sitbenjama	Rajadamnern Stadium	Bangkok, Thailand	Decision	5	3:00
Loses the WMC World Super Flyweight (115 lbs) title.
2003-09-28	Win	(Thailand) Orono Muangsima	Onesongchaim, Rajadamnern Stadium	Bangkok, Thailand	Decision (Unanimous)	5	3:00
2003-08-17	Loss	(Thailand) Orono Sor.Sakulpan	Rajadamnern Stadium	Bangkok, Thailand	Decision	5	3:00
2003-06-23	Draw	(Thailand) Phongsing Kiatchansing	Rajadamnern Stadium	Bangkok, Thailand	Decision	5	3:00
2003-04-26	Win	(Thailand) Saenchainoi Toyotarayong		Chachoengsao, Thailand	Decision	5	3:00
Wins the vacant WMC World Super Flyweight (115 lbs) title.
2003-03-	Win	(Thailand) Wanmeechai Menayothin	Rajadamnern Stadium	Bangkok, Thailand	Decision	5	3:00
2003-02-26	Loss	(Thailand) Phongsing Kiatchansing	Rajadamnern Stadium	Bangkok, Thailand	Decision	5	3:00
Loses the Rajadamnern Stadium Super Flyweight (115 lbs) title.
2002-10-09	Loss	(Thailand) Paruhatnoi Sitjamee	Rajadamnern Stadium	Bangkok, Thailand	Decision	5	3:00
2002-09-09	Loss	(Thailand) Wuttidet Lukprabat	Rajadamnern Stadium	Bangkok, Thailand	Decision	5	3:00
2002-08-07	Loss	(Thailand) Ronnachai Naratreekul	Onesongchai, Rajadamnern Stadium	Bangkok, Thailand	Decision (Unanimous)	5	3:00
2002-07-24	Loss	(Thailand) Orono Sor.Sakulpan	Rajadamnern Stadium	Bangkok, Thailand	Decision	5	3:00
2002-07-09	Loss	(Thailand) Ronnachai Naratreekul	Lumpinee Stadium	Bangkok, Thailand	Decision	5	3:00
2002-04-13	Win	(Thailand) Sayannoi Kiatprapat		Nakhon Ratchasima, Thailand	Decision	5	3:00
2002-03-25	Loss	(Thailand) Klairung Sor.SasiphaGym	Rajadamnern Stadium	Bangkok, Thailand	Decision	5	3:00
2002-01-14	Win	(Thailand) Puja Sor.Suwanee	Rajadamnern Stadium	Bangkok, Thailand	Decision	5	3:00
2001-12-19	Win	(Thailand) Sayannoi Kiatprapat	Rajadamnern Stadium	Bangkok, Thailand	Decision	5	3:00
2001-11-07	Loss	(Thailand) Sayannoi Kiatprapat	Rajadamnern Stadium	Bangkok, Thailand	Decision	5	3:00
Loses the WMC World Super Flyweight (115 lbs) title.
2001-10-	Win	(Thailand) Pornsanae Sitmonchai	Rajadamnern Stadium	Bangkok, Thailand	Decision	5	3:00
2001-	Win	(Thailand) Sayannoi Kiatprapat		Nakhon Ratchasima, Thailand	Decision	5	3:00
Defends the Rajadamnern Stadium and WMC World Super Flyweight (115 lbs) titles.
2001	Win	(Thailand) Michael Sor.Sakulpan	Rajadamnern Stadium	Bangkok, Thailand	Decision	5	3:00
2001-09-05	Win	(Thailand) Bovy Sor.Udomson	Rajadamnern Stadium	Bangkok, Thailand	Decision	5	3:00
2001-	Win	(Thailand) Namkabuanlek Nongkeepahuyuth	Rajadamnern Stadium	Bangkok, Thailand	Decision	5	3:00
2001-07-12	Win	(Thailand) Bovy Sor.Udomson	Rajadamnern Stadium	Bangkok, Thailand	Decision	5	3:00
2001-05-31	Win	(Thailand) Sayannoi Kiatprapat	Rajadamnern Stadium	Bangkok, Thailand	Decision	5	3:00
Wins the Rajadamnern Stadium Super Flyweight (115 lbs) title.
2001-04-25	Loss	(Thailand) Petchtho Sitjaopho	Rajadamnern Stadium	Bangkok, Thailand	Decision	5	3:00
2001-03-22	Win	(Thailand) Puja Sor.Suwanee	Rajadamnern Stadium	Bangkok, Thailand	Decision	5	3:00
2001-02-22	Win	(Thailand) Klairung Sor.SasiphaGym	Rajadamnern Stadium	Bangkok, Thailand	TKO	4	
Wins the WMC World Super Flyweight (115 lbs) title.
2001-	Win	(Thailand) Rungrit Sitchamlong	Lumpinee Stadium	Bangkok, Thailand	Decision	5	3:00
2000-10-06	Loss	(Thailand) Yodpradab Daopadriew	Lumpinee Stadium	Bangkok, Thailand	Decision	5	3:00
2000-	Loss	(Thailand) Phet-Ek Sitjaopho	Lumpinee Stadium	Bangkok, Thailand	Decision	5	3:00
2000-08-04	Loss	(Thailand) Khajornkai Por.Burapha	Lumpinee Stadium	Bangkok, Thailand	Decision	5	3:00
2000-06-02	Win	(Thailand) Wanpichai Sor.Khamsing	Lumpinee Stadium	Bangkok, Thailand	Decision	5	3:00
2000-04-02	Win	(Thailand) Wanpichai Sor.Khamsing	Onesongchai, Lumpinee Stadium	Bangkok, Thailand	Decision (Unanimous)	5	3:00
2000-03-03	Loss	(Thailand) Paruhatnoi Sitjamee	Onesongchai, Lumpinee Stadium	Bangkok, Thailand	Decision	5	3:00
Loses the Lumpinee Stadium Super Flyweight (115 lbs) title.
2000-01-25	Win	(Thailand) Petch Por.Burapa	Onesongchai, Lumpinee Stadium	Bangkok, Thailand	Decision (Unanimous)	5	3:00
1999-12-07	Win	(Thailand) Michael Sor.Sakulphan	Onesongchai, Lumpinee Stadium	Bangkok, Thailand	Decision (Unanimous)	5	3:00
1999-11-05	Loss	(Thailand) Nongbee Kiatyongyut	Onesongchai, Lumpinee Stadium	Bangkok, Thailand	Decision (Unanimous)	5	3:00
1999-09-21	Loss	(Thailand) Michael Sor.Sakulphan	Lumpinee Stadium	Bangkok, Thailand	Decision	5	3:00
1999-08-17	Win	(Thailand) Ngathao Attharungroj	Onesongchai, Lumpinee Stadium	Bangkok, Thailand	TKO (Punch)	3	
1999-07-13	Win	(Thailand) Dansiam Kiatrungroj	Lumpinee Stadium	Bangkok, Thailand	KO	4	
1999-06-04	Loss	(Thailand) Michael Sor.Sakulphan	Lumpinee Stadium	Bangkok, Thailand	Decision	5	3:00
1999-04-23	Win	(Thailand) Wanpichai Sor.Khamsing	Lumpinee Stadium	Bangkok, Thailand	Decision	5	3:00
1999-03-05	Win	(Thailand) Khunpinit Kiattawan	Onesongchai, Lumpinee Stadium	Bangkok, Thailand	Decision (Unanimous)	5	3:00
1999-02-05	Win	(Thailand) Chalamkhao Kiatpantong	Onesongchai, Lumpinee Stadium	Bangkok, Thailand	TKO (Broken jaw)	2	
1999-01-12	Loss	(Thailand) Saenchai Sor.Khamsing	Lumpinee Stadium	Bangkok, Thailand	Decision	5	3:00
1998-12-08	Win	(Thailand) Chansak Singklongsi	Lumpinee Stadium	Bangkok, Thailand	KO (Punches)	1	
1998-10-26	Win	(Thailand) Sakpaitoon Dejrat	Kiatsingnoi, Rajadamnern Stadium	Bangkok, Thailand	Decision	5	3:00
1998-09-12	Win	(Thailand) Saenchai Sor.Khamsing	Lumpinee Stadium	Bangkok, Thailand	Decision	5	3:00
Wins the Lumpinee Stadium Super Flyweight (115 lbs) title.
1998-	Win	(Thailand) Nuengsiam Fairtex		Bangkok, Thailand	Referee stoppage	5	
1998-06-	Win	(Thailand) Udomlek Kitasida		Bangkok, Thailand	Decision	5	3:00
1998-03-02	Win	(Thailand) Duwao Aborigin	Rajadamnern Stadium	Bangkok, Thailand	Decision	5	3:00
1998-01-	Loss	(Thailand) Chaichana Dechtawee	Lumpinee Stadium	Bangkok, Thailand	Decision	5	3:00
1997-12-16	Win	(Thailand) Chaichana Dechtawee	Lumpinee Stadium	Bangkok, Thailand	Decision	5	3:00
1997-09-05	Loss	(Thailand) Densiam Lukprabat	Lumpinee Stadium	Bangkok, Thailand	Decision	5	3:00
1997-07-29	Win	(Thailand) Teelek Por.Yosanan	Lumpinee Stadium	Bangkok, Thailand	KO (Low kick)	1	2:46
Wins the vacant WMC World Super Flyweight (115 lbs) title.
1997-06-20	Draw	(Thailand) Densiam Lukprabat	Lumpinee Stadium	Bangkok, Thailand	Decision	5	3:00
1997-06-06	Win	(Thailand) Ekkachai Tor.Chaibadan	Onesongchai, Lumpinee Stadium	Bangkok, Thailand	KO (Right uppercut)	3	
1997-05-09	Loss	(Thailand) Teelek Por.Samranchai	Lumpinee Stadium	Bangkok, Thailand	Decision (Unanimous)	5	3:00
1997-04-11	Loss	(Thailand) Namsaknoi Yudthagarngamtorn	Lumpinee Stadium	Bangkok, Thailand	Decision	5	3:00
1997-	Win	(Thailand) Saenchai Sor.Khamsing	Lumpinee Stadium	Bangkok, Thailand	KO (Right hook)	3	2:33
1997-	Loss	(Thailand) Wanghin Kiatwichian	Lumpinee Stadium	Bangkok, Thailand	Decision	5	3:00
1997-02-28	Draw	(Thailand) Chatphon Decharat	Lumpinee Stadium	Bangkok, Thailand	Decision	5	3:00
1997-01-30	Win	(Thailand) Wanghin Mor.Prasathinpeemai	Lumpinee Stadium	Bangkok, Thailand	Decision	5	3:00
1997-01-11	Win	(Thailand) Kotchasarn Singklongksi	Lumpinee Stadium	Bangkok, Thailand	KO (Punches)	2	
1996-11-12	Win	(Thailand) Rattanachai Wor.Walapon	Onesongchai, Lumpinee Stadium	Bangkok, Thailand	Decision (Unanimous)	5	3:00
Wins the vacant WMC World Super Flyweight (115 lbs) title.
1996-10-22	Loss	(Thailand) Nuengsiam Fairtex	Lumpinee Stadium	Bangkok, Thailand	Decision	5	3:00
1996-09-24	Loss	(Thailand) Kaolan Kaovichit	Lumpinee Stadium	Bangkok, Thailand	Decision	5	3:00
For the vacant Lumpinee Stadium Super Flyweight (115 lbs) title.
1996-08-30	Win	(Thailand) Sod Looknongyangtoy	Lumpinee Stadium	Bangkok, Thailand	KO (Punch)	2	
1996-07-09	Draw	(Thailand) Sod Looknongyangtoy	Onesongchai, Lumpinee Stadium	Bangkok, Thailand	Decision	5	3:00
1996-05-21	NC	(Thailand) Pudpadlek Sor.Chalermchai	Lumpinee Stadium	Bangkok, Thailand	Referee stoppage	3	
1996-03-26	Loss	(Thailand) Nongnarong Luksamrong	Lumpinee Stadium	Bangkok, Thailand	Decision	5	3:00
For the vacant Lumpinee Stadium and WMC World Super Flyweight (115 lbs) titles.
1996-02-13	Win	(Thailand) Tukatathong Por.Pongsawang	Lumpinee Stadium	Bangkok, Thailand	KO (Uppercut)	4	
1995-11-28	Win	(Thailand) Saenchai Jirakiangkrai	Onesongchai, Lumpinee Stadium	Bangkok, Thailand	Decision	5	3:00
1995-10-17	Win	(Thailand) Tukatathong Por.Pongsawang	Onesongchai, Lumpinee Stadium	Bangkok, Thailand	Decision	5	3:00
1995-08-26	Win	(Thailand) Chaiyai Sitkaruhat	Onesongchai, Lumpinee Stadium	Bangkok, Thailand	Decision (Unanimous)	5	3:00
1995-08-04	Win	(Thailand) Nongnarong Luksamrong	Lumpinee Stadium	Bangkok, Thailand	Decision	5	3:00
1995-05-23	Loss	(Thailand) Sittichai Petchbangprang	Lumpinee Stadium	Bangkok, Thailand	Decision	5	3:00
Loses the Lumpinee Stadium Flyweight (112 lbs) title.
1995-01-03	Loss	(Thailand) Nungubon Sitlerchai	Lumpinee Stadium	Bangkok, Thailand	Decision	5	3:00
1994-11-18	Draw	(Thailand) Huatapan Sor.Sumalee	Lumpinee Stadium	Bangkok, Thailand	Decision	5	3:00
1994-	Win	(Thailand) Netnarin Fairtex	Lumpinee Stadium	Bangkok, Thailand	KO (Headbutt)	4	
Defends the Lumpinee Stadium Flyweight (112 lbs) title.
1994-04-22	Win	(Thailand) Singhao Tor.Hintok	Lumpinee Stadium	Bangkok, Thailand	Decision	5	3:00
1994-02-11	Loss	(Thailand) Nongnarong Luksamrong	Lumpinee Stadium	Bangkok, Thailand	Decision	5	3:00
1994-01-07	Loss	(Thailand) Meechok Sor.Ploenchit	Lumpinee Stadium	Bangkok, Thailand	Decision	5	3:00
1993-11-30	Win	(Thailand) Rittidet Sor.Ploenjit	Lumpinee Stadium	Bangkok, Thailand	Decision	5	3:00
Defends the Lumpinee Stadium Flyweight (112 lbs) title.
1993-10-22	Win	(Thailand) Wangthong Por.Pisitchet	Lumpinee Stadium	Bangkok, Thailand	Decision	5	3:00
1993-10-02	Win	(Thailand) Wangthong Por.Pisitchet	Lumpinee Stadium	Bangkok, Thailand	KO (Right cross)	3	
Wins the Lumpinee Stadium Flyweight (112 lbs) title.
1993-08-31	Win	(Thailand) Pichai Wor.Walapon	Lumpinee Stadium	Bangkok, Thailand	Decision	5	3:00
1993-07-27	Win	(Thailand) Rattanachai Wor.Walapon	Lumpinee Stadium	Bangkok, Thailand	Decision	5	3:00
1993-07-09	Loss	(Thailand) Wangthong Por.Pisitchet	Lumpinee Stadium	Bangkok, Thailand	Decision (Unanimous)	5	3:00
For the Lumpinee Stadium Flyweight (112 lbs) title.
1993-04-06	Win	(Thailand) Nongnarong Luksamrong	Lumpinee Stadium	Bangkok, Thailand	Decision	5	3:00
1993-01-02	Win	(Thailand) Fahsang Por.Pongsawang	Lumpinee Stadium	Bangkok, Thailand	Decision	5	3:00
1992-	Loss	(Thailand) Rittidet Sor.Ploenchit	Lumpinee Stadium	Bangkok, Thailand	Decision	5	3:00
1992-09-26	Win	(Thailand) Wisanuchai Petcharungruang	Lumpinee Stadium	Bangkok, Thailand	Decision	5	3:00
1992-09-11	Win	(Thailand) Rattanachai Wor.Warapol	Lumpinee Stadium	Bangkok, Thailand	TKO (Elbows)	5	
Defends the Lumpinee Stadium Mini Flyweight (108 lbs) title.
1992-	Loss	(Thailand) Tukatathong Por.Pongsawang	Lumpinee Stadium	Bangkok, Thailand	Decision	5	3:00
1992-04-03	Win	(Thailand) Singhao Tor.Hintok	Lumpinee Stadium	Bangkok, Thailand	Decision	5	3:00
1992-03-10	Loss	(Thailand) Panphet Muangsurin	Lumpinee Stadium	Bangkok, Thailand	Decision	5	3:00
1992-02-07	Win	(Thailand) Khanungpetch Jonygym	Lumpinee Stadium	Bangkok, Thailand	Decision	5	3:00
1991-12-24	Loss	(Thailand) Tukatathong Por.Pongsawang	Lumpinee Stadium	Bangkok, Thailand	Decision	5	3:00
1991-11	Loss	(Thailand) Pompetch Kiatchatpayak	Lumpinee Stadium	Bangkok, Thailand	Decision	5	3:00
1991-10-18	Loss	(Thailand) Chainoi Muangsurin	Lumpinee Stadium	Bangkok, Thailand	Decision	5	3:00
1991-09-	Win	(Thailand) Chainoi Muangsurin	Lumpinee Stadium	Bangkok, Thailand	Decision	5	3:00
1991-08-28	Loss	(Thailand) Samuangnoi Lukjaophomahesak	Rajadamnern Stadium	Bangkok, Thailand	Decision	5	3:00
1991-07-30	Win	(Thailand) Toto Por Pongsawang	Lumpinee Stadium	Bangkok, Thailand	Decision	5	3:00
1991-07-02	Win	(Thailand) Morakot Sor.Thammarangsi	Lumpinee Stadium	Bangkok, Thailand	Decision	5	3:00
Wins the Lumpinee Stadium Light Flyweight (108 lbs) title.
1991-04-30	Loss	(Thailand) Toto Por Pongsawang	Lumpinee Stadium	Bangkok, Thailand	Decision	5	3:00
1991-03-25	Win	(Thailand) Pairojnoi Sor.Siamchai	Lumpinee Stadium	Bangkok, Thailand	Decision	5	3:00
1991-03-01	Win	(Thailand) Kompayak Singmanee	Lumpinee Stadium	Bangkok, Thailand	Decision	5	3:00
1991-01-25	Loss	(Thailand) Toto Por Pongsawang	Lumpinee Stadium	Bangkok, Thailand	Decision	5	3:00
1991-01-20	Win	(Thailand) Lamnamoon Sor.Sumalee	Rajadamnern Stadium	Bangkok, Thailand	Decision	5	3:00
1990-12-17	Win	(Thailand) Sornsuknoi Keatwichean	Rajadamnern Stadium	Bangkok, Thailand	Decision	5	3:00
1990-12-01	Win	(Thailand) Methanoi Sor.Maliwan	Lumpinee Stadium	Bangkok, Thailand	Decision	5	3:00
Defends the Lumpinee Stadium Mini Flyweight (105 lbs) title.
1990-10-30	Win	(Thailand) Hansulek Singkhonpan	Lumpinee Stadium	Bangkok, Thailand	Decision	5	3:00
1990-09-28	Win	(Thailand) Hansulek Singkhonpan	Lumpinee Stadium	Bangkok, Thailand	Decision	5	3:00
1990-09-11	Win	(Thailand) Khanuphet Jonnygym	Lumpinee Stadium	Bangkok, Thailand	Decision	5	3:00
1990-08-21	Win	(Thailand) Nungubon Sitlerchai	Lumpinee Stadium	Bangkok, Thailand	Decision	5	3:00
Wins the Lumpinee Stadium Mini Flyweight (105 lbs) title.
1990-07-28	Win	(Thailand) Takrawlek Dejrath	Lumpinee Stadium	Bangkok, Thailand	Decision	5	3:00
1990-07-06	Win	(Thailand) Chainoi Sitchunthong	Lumpinee Stadium	Bangkok, Thailand	Decision	5	3:00
1990-06-21	Loss	(Thailand) Methanoi Maliwan	Lumpinee Stadium	Bangkok, Thailand	Decision	5	3:00
1990-05-18	Win	(Thailand) Chainoi Sitchunthong	Lumpinee Stadium	Bangkok, Thailand	Decision	5	3:00
1990-04-24	Loss	(Thailand) Chainoi Sitchunthong	Lumpinee Stadium	Bangkok, Thailand	Decision	5	3:00
1990-04-10	Win	(Thailand) Chandet Sor.Prantalay	Lumpinee Stadium	Bangkok, Thailand	Decision	5	3:00
1990-03-25	Win	(Thailand) Sinchai Saksamut	Rajadamnern Stadium	Bangkok, Thailand	Decision	5	3:00
1990-03-03	Win	(Thailand) Rungrat Srisunchai	Lumpinee Stadium	Bangkok, Thailand	Decision	5	3:00
1990-02-16	Win	(Thailand) Kwanla Bangprachan	Lumpinee Stadium	Bangkok, Thailand	Decision	5	3:00
1990-01-20	Loss	(Thailand) Nungubon Sitlerchai	Lumpinee Stadium	Bangkok, Thailand	Decision	5	3:00
1990-01-02	Win	(Thailand) Methanoi Maliwan	Lumpinee Stadium	Bangkok, Thailand	Decision	5	3:00
1989-08-18	Win	(Thailand) Naewrob Por.Muang Ubon	Lumpinee Stadium	Bangkok, Thailand	Decision	5	3:00
1987-10-13	Loss	(Thailand) Noenthong Singkhiri	Lumpinee Stadium	Bangkok, Thailand	Decision	5	3:00
Thongchai's debut in a major Bangkok stadium.
Legend: Win Loss Draw/No contest Notes
