= Pornsawan Porpramook =

Thai boxer

Personal information
- Nicknames: The Tank; 2000 Terminator
- Born: Somporn Seeta (สมพร สีทา); March 10, 1978 (age 48) Prachinburi, (now Sa Kaeo), Thailand
- Height: 5 ft 2 in (157 cm)
- Weight: Minimumweight; Light flyweight

Boxing career
- Reach: 63 in (160 cm)
- Stance: Orthodox

Boxing record
- Total fights: 35
- Wins: 28
- Win by KO: 17
- Losses: 6
- Draws: 1

Pornsawan Porpramook (Thai: พรสวรรค์ ป.ประมุข born in Ta Phraya District, Prachinburi Province (now in Sa Kaeo Province) is a Thai professional boxer in the minimumweight division and is a former WBA minimumweight champion. Porpramook has been also rated in the top ten by Ring Magazine at minimumweight until as of October 2011. Porpramook lost the title in his first defence against Japan's Akira Yaegashi via a tenth round technical knockout at the Korakuen Hall in Tokyo on October 24, 2011. Porpramook fought again for the WBA minimumweight world title on December 31, 2012 against Ryo Miyazaki, where he lost by split decision.

== Titles and accomplishments ==
=== Muay Thai ===
- Lumpinee Stadium
  - 1999 Lumpinee Stadium Mini Flyweight (105 lbs) Champion
  - 2001 Lumpinee Stadium 108 lbs Champion
- Professional Boxing Association of Thailand (PAT)
  - 2000 Thailand 108 lbs Champion

=== Boxing ===
- Pan Asian Boxing Association
  - 2001 PABA Super Minimumweight Champion (16 defenses)
  - 2013 interim PABA Super Light-flyweight Champion
- World Boxing Council
  - 2008 interim WBC Asian Boxing Council Minimumweight Champion
- World Boxing Association
  - 2011 WBA World Minimumweight Champion

== Professional boxing record ==
35 fights	28 wins	6 losses
By knockout	17	2
By decision	11	4
Draws	1	

No.	Result	Record	Opponent	Type	Round, time	Date	Location	Notes
35	Loss	28–6–1	Rey Loreto	TD	10 (12), 1:01	23 Aug 2013	Siam Amazing Park, Bangkok, Thailand	
34	Win	28–5–1	Jayson Rotoni	TD	5 (12)	18 Jun 2013	Bangkok, Thailand	
33	Loss	27–5–1	Ryo Miyazaki	SD	12	31 Dec 2012	Bodymaker Colosseum, Osaka, Japan	For vacant WBA minimumweight title
32	Win	27–4–1	Madit Sada	TKO	3 (6)	24 Oct 2012	Central Stadium, Loei, Thailand	
31	Win	26–4–1	Rodel Tejares	PTS	6	27 Jul 2012	Royal Square, Bangkok, Thailand	
30	Win	25–4–1	Michael Rodriguez	PTS	8	30 May 2012	Kemapitaram School, Nonthaburi, Thailand	
29	Win	24–4–1	Safwan Lombok	PTS	6	5 Mar 2012	700 Years Anniversary Sports St., Chiang Mai, Thailand	
28	Loss	23–4–1	Akira Yaegashi	TKO	10 (12), 2:38	24 Oct 2011	Korakuen Hall, Tokyo, Japan	Lost WBA minimumweight title
27	Win	23–3–1	Muhammad Rachman	MD	12	30 Jul 2011	Indosiar Studio, Jakarta, Indonesia	Won WBA minimumweight title
26	Draw	22–3–1	Oleydong Sithsamerchai	MD	12	3 Sep 2010	Kad Choengdoi, Chiang Mai, Thailand	For WBC minimumweight title
25	Win	22–3	Safwan Lombok	PTS	6	15 Sep 2009	Kapong, Thailand	
24	Loss	21–3	Édgar Sosa	TKO	4 (12), 2:32	4 Apr 2009	Ciudad Victoria, Mexico	For WBC light flyweight title
23	Loss	21–2	Oleydong Sithsamerchai	UD	12	27 Nov 2008	Phitsanulok, Thailand	For WBC minimumweight title
22	Win	21–1	Richard Garcia	TKO	5 (12), 1:34	14 Feb 2008	Pattavikorn Market, Bangkok, Thailand	
21	Loss	20–1	Donnie Nietes	UD	12	30 Sep 2007	Waterfront Cebu City Hotel & Casino, Cebu City, Philippines	For vacant WBO minimumweight title
20	Win	20–0	Benjie Sorolla	UD	12	1 Aug 2007	Por Kungpao Restaurant, Bangkok, Thailand	Retained PABA minimumweight title
19	Win	19–0	Dani Boy Sahuleka	KO	10 (12), 2:16	28 May 2007	Nakhon Nayok, Thailand	Retained PABA minimumweight title
18	Win	18–0	Heri Amol	KO	8 (12), 1:38	20 Apr 2007	Pattavikorn Market, Bangkok, Thailand	Retained PABA minimumweight title
17	Win	17–0	Tommy Terado	KO	5 (12)	28 Nov 2006	13 Coins Restaurant, Min Buri, Thailand	Retained PABA minimumweight title
16	Win	16–0	Jun Arlos	UD	12	22 Aug 2006	Surin, Thailand	Retained PABA minimumweight title
15	Win	15–0	Sonny Boy Jaro	KO	5 (12), 1:40	29 Mar 2006	Rong Kluea Market, Sa Kaeo, Thailand	Retained PABA minimumweight title
14	Win	14–0	Johan Wahyudi	RTD	10 (12), 3:00	6 Feb 2006	13 Coins Restaurant, Min Buri, Thailand	Retained PABA minimumweight title
13	Win	13–0	Carlo Besares	UD	12	13 Oct 2005	Second Sanamluang, Bangkok, Thailand	Retained PABA minimumweight title
12	Win	12–0	Nino Suelo	UD	12	17 May 2005	Sisaket, Thailand	Retained PABA minimumweight title
11	Win	11–0	Payapung Maimuangkorn	KO	3 (10)	10 Dec 2004	Lumpinee Boxing Stadium, Bangkok, Thailand	Won vacant Thai minimumweight title
10	Win	10–0	Ut Taprakhon	KO	4 (6)	9 Nov 2004	Lumpinee Boxing Stadium, Bangkok, Thailand	
9	Win	9–0	Iwan Key	TKO	5 (12)	8 Dec 2003	Chachoengsao, Thailand	Retained PABA minimumweight title
8	Win	8–0	Wendil Cajoles	UD	12	17 Oct 2003	Nakhon Pathom, Thailand	Retained PABA minimumweight title
7	Win	7–0	Martin Mahlangu	KO	4 (12)	23 May 2003	Omnoi Stadium, Samut Sakhon, Thailand	Retained PABA minimumweight title
6	Win	6–0	Armando Atillo	TKO	5 (12)	24 Feb 2003	Bangkok, Thailand	Retained PABA minimumweight title
5	Win	5–0	Fabio Marfa	TKO	6 (12)	27 Sep 2002	Uttaradit, Thailand	Retained PABA minimumweight title
4	Win	4–0	Nico Thomas	KO	1 (12)	1 Aug 2002	Samut Prakan, Thailand	Retained PABA minimumweight title
3	Win	3–0	Sonny Boco	KO	5 (12), 1:56	11 Apr 2002	Princess Crown Hotel, Poipet, Cambodia	Retained PABA minimumweight title
2	Win	2–0	Juharum Silaban	KO	3 (12)	28 Nov 2001	Sa Kaeo, Thailand	Won vacant PABA minimumweight title
1	Win	1–0	Victor Ranturambee	KO	1 (10)	20 Sep 2001	Bangkok, Thailand	

== Muay Thai record ==
Muay Thai Record
Date	Result	Opponent	Event	Location	Method	Round	Time
2010-08-25	Loss	(Thailand) Wanheng Menayothin	Toyota Marathon Tournament, Quarterfinals	Thailand	Decision	3	3:00
2009-07-31	Win	(Thailand) Saenkeng Thor Thongchai	Saengsawang, Lumpinee Stadium	Bangkok, Thailand	Decision	5	3:00
2009-06-19	Loss	(Thailand) Fahrungruang Sor.Poolsawat	Petchpiya, Lumpinee Stadium	Bangkok, Thailand	Decision	5	3:00
2009-05-22	Win	(Thailand) Wanchai Sor.Kittisak	Por.Pramuk, Lumpinee Stadium	Bangkok, Thailand	KO	1	0:53
2001-08-07		(Thailand) Mafaonglek Chor.Na Phatthalung	Por.Pramook, Lumpinee Stadium	Bangkok, Thailand			
2001-06-30	Win	(Thailand) Daoprasuk Sit Pafa	Lumpinee Stadium	Bangkok, Thailand	Decision	5	3:00
2001-05-29	Win	(Thailand) Samson Lukjaopormahesak		Bangkok, Thailand	KO	2	
2001-02-23	Win	(Thailand) Saensuk Por Kaewsen	Por.Pramook, Lumpinee Stadium	Bangkok, Thailand	Decision	5	3:00
2000-12-08	Win	(Thailand) Samson Lukjaopormahesak	Lumpinee Stadium	Bangkok, Thailand	Decision	5	3:00
Wins Thailand 108 lbs title.
2000-10-10	Win	(Thailand) Fahsuchon Sit-O	Lumpinee Stadium	Bangkok, Thailand	Decision	5	3:00
2000-06-06	Loss	(Thailand) Petchtapi Por Singtai	Fairtex, Lumpinee Stadium	Bangkok, Thailand	Decision	5	3:00
2000-03-17		(Thailand) Yodradab Daopaedriew	Por.Pramook, Lumpinee Stadium	Bangkok, Thailand			
2000-02-01	Draw	(Thailand) Yodradab Daopaedriew	Por.Pramook, Lumpinee Stadium	Bangkok, Thailand	Decision	5	3:00
2000-01-13	Loss	(Thailand) Samson Lukjaopormahesak	Rajadamnern Stadium	Bangkok, Thailand	Decision	5	3:00
1999-11-08	Win	(Thailand) Klairung Sor.Chaicharoen	Rajadamnern Stadium	Bangkok, Thailand	Decision	5	3:00
1999-10-02	Win	(Thailand) Rungrit Sitchamong	Lumpinee Stadium	Bangkok, Thailand	Decision	5	3:00
Wins the Lumpinee Stadium Mini Flyweight (105 lbs) title.
1999-08-28	Win	(Thailand) Rungrit Sitchamong	Rajadamnern Stadium	Bangkok, Thailand	Decision	5	3:00
1999-06-29	Win	(Thailand) Ekachai Chaibadan	Lumpinee Stadium	Bangkok, Thailand	Decision	5	3:00
1999-	Loss	(Thailand) Paruhatnoi Sor.Charoensuk	Lumpinee Stadium	Bangkok, Thailand	Decision	5	3:00
1998-01-16	Win	(Thailand) Nongbee Kiatyongyut	Rajadamnern Stadium	Bangkok, Thailand	Decision	5	3:00
Legend: Win Loss Draw/No contest Notes

== See also ==
- List of Mini-flyweight boxing champions

Achievements
Preceded by Muhammad Rachman	WBA minimumweight champion July 30, 2011 - October 24, 2011	Succeeded by Akira Yaegashi
