= Ngathao Attharungroj =

Thai Muay Thai fighter

- Born: Surin Somanan; January 15, 1979 (age 47); Laem Ngop district, Trat province Thailand
- Other names: Ngathao SeaOilGym (ซีออยยิม); Ngatao Sor Attarungrot; Ngathao Attharoongroj
- Nickname: Stingray (กระเบนธง)
- Height: 168 cm (5 ft 6 in)
- Division: Flyweight; Super Flyweight; Bantamweight; Super Bantamweight; Featherweight
- Style: Muay Thai
- Stance: Orthodox
- Fighting out of: Rayong province, Thailand
- Team: Kiatprachachai Gym; Kiatrungroj
- Trainer: Thewa Kiattrungroj

Surin Somanan, known professionally as Ngathao Attharungroj (Thai: งาเทา อรรถรุ่งโรจน์), is a Thai former professional Muay Thai fighter. He is a former Lumpinee Stadium Bantamweight Champion.

== Biography and career ==
Ngathao started training in Muay Thai at the age of 11 at the Por.Pinprapha camp in the Rayong province. He had his first fights in various festivals under the name Ngathao Sit Hussein. He later joined the Kiatprachachai camp where he would receive the ring name to Ngathao Attharungroj, from there he had over 60 fights in the various eastern provinces of Thailand. At the age of 16 Ngathao started to compete in Bangkok for the Onesongchai promotion.

Ngathao defeated many notable champions of his era such as Sod Looknongyangtoy, Nongbee Kiatyongyut, Phet-Ek Sitjaopho, Saenchernglek Jirakriengkrai, Wuttidet Lukprabat and Phetek Kiatyongyut. Ngathao captured the most important title of his career on September 30, 2003, when he defeated Petchmanee Petchsupapan by decision to take his Lumpinee Stadium Bantamweight title. Known for his fan friendly, aggressive style, Ngathao earned two "Lumpinee Stadium Fight of the Year" awards in 2003 and 2004.

After retiring from competition Ngathao became a trainer. He teaches at the Por.Khonsong Gym in the Rayong province.

== Titles and accomplishments ==
- Lumpinee Stadium
  - 2000 Ford Ranger Tournament Winner
  - 2003 Lumpinee Stadium Bantamweight (118 lbs) Champion
  - 2003 Lumpinee Stadium Fight of the Year (vs. Saenchernglek Jirakriangkrai)
  - 2004 Lumpinee Stadium Fight of the Year (vs. Pinsiam Sor.Amnuaysirichoke)
- World Muaythai Council
  - WMC World Super Bantamweight (122 lbs) Champion

== Muay Thai record ==
Muay Thai record
Date	Result	Opponent	Event	Location	Method	Round	Time
2008-	Loss	(Thailand) Chatri Sitpafa		Rayong province, Thailand	Decision	5	3:00
2008-03-23	Loss	(Thailand) Santipap SantiUbon		Rayong province, Thailand	TKO (High kick)	2	
2008-02-03	Loss	(Thailand) Napakrit NamplatrahoimookGym	Channel 7 Stadium	Bangkok, Thailand	Decision	5	3:00
2007-06-10	Win	(Thailand) Kongdech EminentAir	Channel 7 Stadium	Bangkok, Thailand	Decision	5	3:00
2007-04-22	Win	(Thailand) Sayannoi Katiprapat	Channel 7 Stadium	Bangkok, Thailand	Decision	5	3:00
2006-10-21	Loss	(Thailand) Loengern Pitakkruchadan	Omnoi Stadium	Samut Sakhon, Thailand	TKO	3	
2006-09-09	Loss	(Thailand) Pettawee Sor Kittichai	Omnoi Stadium	Samut Sakhon, Thailand	Decision	5	3:00
2006-08-15	Win	(Thailand) Kanchai Kor.Bangkruai	Kiatpetch, Lumpinee Stadium	Bangkok, Thailand	Decision	5	3:00
2006-07-07		(Thailand) Khunseuk Sitkriangkrai	Kiatpetch, Lumpinee Stadium	Bangkok, Thailand			
2006-02-19	Loss	(Thailand) Khunseuk Sitkriangkrai	Channel 7 Stadium	Bangkok, Thailand	Decision	5	3:00
?	Win	(Thailand) Dendanai Kiattisakkongka		Bangkok, Thailand	Decision	5	3:00
Wins the WMC World Super Bantamweight (122 lbs) title.
2005-09-23	Loss	(Thailand) Captainken Narupai	Kiatpetch, Lumpinee Stadium	Bangkok, Thailand	KO	1	
2005-07-15	Win	(Thailand) Captainken Narupai	Chang Siamchai, Lumpinee Stadium	Bangkok, Thailand	Decision (Split)	5	3:00
2005-04-29	Win	(Thailand) Saenchernglek Jirakriengkrai	Chang Siamchai, Lumpinee Stadium	Bangkok, Thailand	Decision	5	3:00
2005-03-26	Loss	(Thailand) Anuwat Kaewsamrit	Palokmuaythai ITV, Omnoi Stadium	Bangkok, Thailand	TKO (Right cross)	2	
2005-01-18	Win	(Thailand) Phetek Kiatyongyut	Kiatpetch, Lumpinee Stadium	Bangkok, Thailand	Decision	5	3:00
2004-12-07	Win	(Thailand) Sueahuallek Chor.Sophipong	Lumpinee Stadium Birthday Show	Bangkok, Thailand	Decision	5	3:00
2004-10-12	Win	(Thailand) Phet-Ek Sitjawai	Kiatpetch, Lumpinee Stadium	Bangkok, Thailand	Decision	5	3:00
2004-09-10	Loss	(Thailand) Pinsiam Sor.Amnuaysirichoke	Kiatpetch, Lumpinee Stadium	Bangkok, Thailand	Decision	5	3:00
2004-07-13	Win	(Thailand) Wuttidet Lukprabat	Phetsupaphan, Lumpinee Stadium	Bangkok, Thailand	Decision	5	3:00
2004-05-08	Win	(Thailand) Duewa Kongudom	Omnoi Stadium	Samut Sakhon, Thailand	Decision	5	3:00
2004-04-09	Loss	(Thailand) Phet-Ek Sitjawai	Lumpinee Stadium	Bangkok, Thailand	Decision	5	3:00
For the Thailand Bantamweight (118 lbs) title.
2004-02-06	Loss	(Thailand) Phet-Ek Sitjawai	Phetsupaphan, Lumpinee Stadium	Bangkok, Thailand	Decision	5	3:00
2003-12-28	Win	(Thailand) Saenchernglek Jirakriengkrai	Channel 7 Stadium	Bangkok, Thailand	Decision	5	3:00
2003-11-25	Win	(Thailand) Phet-Ek Sitjawai	Kiatpetch, Lumpinee Stadium	Bangkok, Thailand	Decision	5	3:00
Wins a 1 million baht side-bet.
2003-10-	Win	(Thailand) Petchmanee Petchsupapan	Channel 7 Stadium	Bangkok, Thailand	Decision	5	3:00
2003-09-30	Win	(Thailand) Petchmanee Petchsupapan	Lumpinee Stadium	Bangkok, Thailand	Decision	5	3:00
Wins Lumpinee Stadium Bantamweight (118 lbs) title.
2003-08-21	Draw	(Thailand) Duewa Kongudom	Bangrachan, Rajadamnern Stadium	Bangkok, Thailand	Decision	5	3:00
2003-07-22	Win	(Thailand) Sakonphet Nakornthongparkview	Kiatpetch, Lumpinee Stadium	Bangkok, Thailand	Decision	5	3:00
2003-06-06	Draw	(Thailand) Saenchernglek Jirakriengkrai	Pinsinchai, Lumpinee Stadium	Bangkok, Thailand	Decision	5	3:00
2003-05-02	Win	(Thailand) Saenchernglek Jirakriengkrai	Lumpinee Stadium	Bangkok, Thailand	Decision	5	3:00
2003-03-21	Loss	(Thailand) Khunsuk Kiattikriengkrai	Kiatpetch, Lumpinee Stadium	Bangkok, Thailand	Decision	5	3:00
2003-02-11	Loss	(Thailand) Fahsuchon Sit-O	Phetsupaphan, Lumpinee Stadium	Bangkok, Thailand	TKO	4	
2002-12-20	Loss	(Thailand) Kongdech Kiattipraphat	Kiatpetch, Lumpinee Stadium	Bangkok, Thailand	Decision	5	3:00
2002-11-29	Draw	(Thailand) Singdam Kiatmuu9	Fairtex, Lumpinee Stadium	Bangkok, Thailand	Decision	5	3:00
2002-10-09	Loss	(Thailand) Bovy Sor Udomson	Onesongchai, Rajadamnern Stadium	Bangkok, Thailand	Decision	5	3:00
2002-08-07	Loss	(Thailand) Puja Sor.Suwanee	Rajadamnern Stadium	Bangkok, Thailand	Decision	5	3:00
2002-07-04	Loss	(Thailand) Kem Sitsongpeenong	Rajadamnern Stadium	Bangkok, Thailand	Decision	5	3:00
2002-06-05	Win	(Thailand) Pornnimit Kiatchansing	Phetmanahak, Rajadamnern Stadium	Bangkok, Thailand	Decision	5	3:00
2002-01-14	Loss	(Thailand) Phet-Ek Sitjaopho	Wan Muay Thai + Onesongchai, Rajadamnern Stadium	Bangkok, Thailand	Decision	5	3:00
2001-12-19	Win	(Thailand) Rattanasak Wor.Walapon	Onesongchai, Rajadamnern Stadium Birthday Show	Bangkok, Thailand	Decision	5	3:00
2001-09-05	Loss	(Thailand) Michael Sor.Sakulpan	Rajadamnern Stadium	Bangkok, Thailand	Decision	5	3:00
2001-07-12	Win	(Thailand) Dendanai Kiattisakkongka.	Onesongchai, Rajadamnern Stadium	Bangkok, Thailand	Decision	5	3:00
2001-06-07	Win	(Thailand) Phetto Sitjaopho	Onesongchai, Rajadamnern Stadium	Bangkok, Thailand	Decision	5	3:00
2001-04-25	Loss	(Thailand) Anuwat Kaewsamrit	Rajadamnern Stadium	Bangkok, Thailand	Decision	5	3:00
2001-03-27	Loss	(Thailand) Sanghiran Lukbanyai	Lumpinee Stadium	Bangkok, Thailand	Decision	5	3:00
For a 1 million baht side-bet.
2001-02-14	Win	(Thailand) Densiam Lukphrabat	Rajadamnern Stadium	Bangkok, Thailand	Decision	5	3:00
2000-12-19	Win	(Thailand) Phet-Ek Sitjaopho	Onesongchai, Lumpinee Stadium	Bangkok, Thailand	KO	2	
2000-11-24	Loss	(Thailand) Phet-Ek Sitjaopho	Onesongchai, Lumpinee Stadium	Bangkok, Thailand	Decision	5	3:00
2000-10-31	Win	(Thailand) Nongbee Kiatyongyut	OneSongchai, Lumpinee Stadium	Bangkok, Thailand	Decision	5	3:00
2000-10-06	Win	(Thailand) Nongbee Kiatyongyut	OneSongchai, Lumpinee Stadium	Bangkok, Thailand	Decision	5	3:00
2000-08-05	Win	(Thailand) Saenchai Jirakriangkrai	Lumpinee Stadium - Ford Ranger Tournament, Final	Bangkok, Thailand	Decision	5	3:00
Wins the 2000 Ford Ranger Tournament title.
2000-06-24	Win	(Thailand) Sod Looknongyangtoy	Lumpinee Stadium - Ford Ranger Tournament, Semifinal	Bangkok, Thailand	Decision	5	3:00
2000-05-20	Win	(Thailand) Payaklek Sitjamee	Lumpinee Stadium - Ford Ranger Tournament, Quarterfinal	Bangkok, Thailand	Decision	5	3:00
2000-04-22	Loss	(Thailand) Khajornklai Por.Burapha		Bangkok, Thailand	Decision	5	3:00
2000-03-18	Loss	(Thailand) Saenchai Jirakriangkrai	Onesongchai, Lumpinee Stadium	Bangkok, Thailand	Decision	5	3:00
2000-	Loss	(Thailand) Petch Por.Burapha	Lumpinee Stadium	Bangkok, Thailand	Decision	5	3:00
For the vacant Lumpinee Stadium Flyweight (112 lbs) title.
1999-08-17	Loss	(Thailand) Thongchai Tor.Silachai	Onesongchai, Lumpinee Stadium	Bangkok, Thailand	TKO (Punches)	3	
1999-01-31	Win	(Thailand) Sakonphet Nakornthongparkview		Chachoengsao province, Thailand	Decision	5	3:00
1998-10-03	Win	(Thailand) Therdthailak Nakornthongparkview	Lumpinee Stadium	Bangkok, Thailand	Decision	5	3:00
1998-07-04	Win	(Thailand) Nikom Sitthiwatkoh	Lumpinee Stadium	Bangkok, Thailand	Decision	5	3:00
1998-04-28	Win	(Thailand) Teelak Sitthichat	Lumpinee Stadium	Bangkok, Thailand	Decision	5	3:00
Legend: Win Loss Draw/No contest Notes
