= Wichan Sakiya =

Thai footballer

Personal information
- Full name: Wichan Sakiya
- Date of birth: October 1977 (age 48–49)
- Place of birth: Chachoengsao, Thailand
- Height: 1.72 m (5 ft 8 in)
- Position: Striker

Senior career*
Years	Team	Apps	(Gls)
1997–1998	Police		
1999–2003	Krung Thai Bank F.C.		
2004–2005	Police		
2006–2008	Cha Choeng Sao F.C.		
- * Club domestic league appearances and goals as of 14 July 2011

Wichan Sakiya (Thai: วิชาญ สากิยะ), born October 10, 1977 is a retired Thai footballer. Sakiya won the Kor Royal Cup with Krung Thai Bank FC in the 2002-03 and 2003-04 seasons of the Thai Premier League.
