= Fighter of the Year (Muay Thai) =

There are three major "Fighter of the Year" awards presented yearly. The Sports Writers Association of Thailand announces the winner in March or April, the Sports Authority of Thailand decides the winner at the end of December, and the Siam Kela award was given in March annually before the COVID-19 pandemic.

== Sports Writers Association of Thailand ==
The Sports Writers Association of Thailand Fighter of the Year award was inaugurated in 1984. Prior to 1984, several fighters were awarded the "Athlete of the Year Award."

In its history, there have only been four fighters to have won the award more than once: Kaensak Sor.Ploenjit in 1989 and 1990, Saenchai Sor.Kingstar in 1999 and 2008, Anuwat Kaewsamrit in 2003 and 2004, and Panpayak Jitmuangnon who won the award in three consecutive years, from 2013 to 2015.

Thongchai Tor.Silachai was the oldest recipient of the award as he won it at 30 years old in 2001. He defeats Saenchai Sor.Kingstar by 2 years as Saenchai won the award for a second time at 28 years old in 2008.

In 2012, Yodwicha Por.Boonsit and Sangmanee Sor.Tienpo shared the award. Sangmanee was the youngest Fighter of the Year in the history of the award, narrowly beating out Yodwicha by 30 days as they were both 15 years old at the time.

In 2019, the Sports Writers Association of Thailand revoked Rungnarai Kiatmuu9's 2018 Fighter of the Year award after he was knocked out by Yothin F.A.Group just days after he had received the award.

In 2024, Petchsiam Jor.Pattreya was the only nominee for the award, but as he was knocked out by Khunsueklek Boomdeksian the week before the award ceremony, the award was not given to anyone.

=== Traditional ===
Year	Fighter
1984	Kongtoranee Payakaroon
1985	Chamuakpet Hapalang
1986	Panomtuanlek Hapalang
1987	Langsuan Panyuthaphum
1988	Samart Payakaroon
1989	Kaensak Sor.Ploenjit
1990	Kaensak Sor.Ploenjit
1991	Saenmuangnoi Lukjaopormahesak
1992	Jaroensap Kiatbanchong
1993	Wangchannoi Sor.Palangchai
1994	Orono Por Muang Ubon
1995	Kaoponglek Luksuratam
1996	Namsaknoi Yudthagarngamtorn
1997	Anantasak Panyuthaphum
1998	Kaolan Kaovichit
1999	Saenchai Sor.Kingstar
2000	Fahsuchon Sit-O
2001	Thongchai Tor.Silachai
2002	Singdam Kiatmuu9
2003	Anuwat Kaewsamrit
2004	Anuwat Kaewsamrit
2005	Nong-O Sit-Or
2006	Jomthong Pomkwannarong
2007	Wuttidet Lukprabat
2008	Saenchai Sor.Kingstar
2009	Rungruanglek Lukprabat
2010	Kongsak Sitboonmee
2011	PenEk Sitnumnoi
2012	Yodwicha Por.Boonsit Sangmanee Sor.Tienpo
2013	Panpayak Jitmuangnon
2014	Panpayak Jitmuangnon
2015	Panpayak Jitmuangnon
2016	PhetUtong Or.Kwanmuang
2017	Kulabdam Sor.Jor.Piek-U-Thai
2018	Rungnarai Kiatmuu9 (revoked)
2019	Not awarded
2020	Not awarded
2021	Ferrari Fairtex
2022	Chalamdam Nayokathasala
2023	Not awarded
2024	Khunsueklek Boomdeksian
2025	Khunsueknoi Boomdeksian

=== Non Traditional ===
Year	Fighter
2023	Tawanchai P.K. Saenchaimuaythaigym
2024	Nabil Anane
2025	Phetjeeja Lukjaoporongtom

== Sports Authority of Thailand ==
The Sports Authority of Thailand Fighter of the Year award is awarded annually in December.

In the history of the award, only two fighters have won it more than once: Nong-O Sit-Or and Sagetdao Petpayathai.

=== Traditional ===
==== Male ====
Year	Fighter
1993	Chatchai Paiseetong
1994	Wanwiset Kaennorasing
1995	Not awarded
1996	Chutin Por.Tawachai
1997	Attachai Por.Samranchai
1998	Thongchai Tor.Silachai
1999	Namsaknoi Yudthagarngamtorn
2000	Watcharachai Kaewsamrit
2001	Thongchai Tor.Silachai
2002	Klairung Sor.Chaicharoen
2003	Singdam Kiatmuu9
2004	Anuwat Kaewsamrit
2005	Nong-O Sit-Or
2006	Norasing Lukbanyai
2007	Sagetdao Petpayathai
2008	Saenchai Sor.Kingstar
2009	Sagetdao Petpayathai
2010	Nong-O Sit-Or
2011	Sam-A Gaiyanghadao
2012	Superlek Kiatmuu9
2013	Pakorn P.K.Saenchaimuaythaigym
2014	Superbank Sakchaichot
2015	Saeksan Or.Kwanmuang
2016	Puenkon Tor.Surat
2017	Phetmuangchon Por.Suantong
2018	Tawanchai P.K.Saenchaimuaythaigym
2019	Kiewpayak Jitmuangnon
2020	Kongklai AnnyMuayThai
2021	Lamnamoonlek Tded99
2022	Ronachai Tor.Ramintra
2023	Petchjakajan Chor.Hapayak
2024	Khunsueklek Boomdeksian
2025	Khunsueknoi Boomdeksian

==== Female ====
Year	Fighter
2024	Pinpetch Mor.RajabhatKorat
2025	Mongkutpetch KhaolakMuaythai

=== Non Traditional ===
==== Male ====
Year	Fighter
2025	Nabil Anane

==== Female ====
Year	Fighter
2025	Phetjeeja Lukjaoporongtom

== Siam Kela ==
The Siam Kela award is given on March 6 every year.

The award is not strictly for Muay Thai. In fact, Muay Thai is only a small part of their award ceremonies. Recipients of the award also receive a prize of ฿50,000 baht.

Year	Fighter
2006	Norasing Lukbanyai
2007	Wuttidet Lukprabat
2008	Saenchai Sor.Kingstar
2009	Pornsanae Sitmonchai
2010	Sam-A Gaiyanghadao
2011	Sam-A Gaiyanghadao
2012	Yodwicha Por.Boonsit
2013	Petchboonchu F.A.Group
2014	Superbank Sakchaichot
2015	Thanonchai Thanakorngym
2016	Puenkon Tor.Surat
2017	Yodlekpet Or.Pitisak
2018	Tawanchai P.K.Saenchaimuaythaigym
2019	Nuenglanlek Jitmuangnon
