= Bovy Sor Udomson =

Thai professional Muay Thai fighter and kickboxer

Bovy Sor.Udomson
- Born: Piyapong Chuanpo; January 21, 1984 (age 42); Kalasin, Thailand
- Native name: พีระพงษ์ ชวนโพธิ์
- Nickname: New Rambo (แรมโบ้สายพันธุ์ใหม่); Bo (โบ)
- Height: 165 cm (5 ft 5 in)
- Division: Super Bantamweight; Featherweight; Lightweight; Super Lightweight; Welterweight; Super Welterweight
- Style: Muay Thai (Muay Bouk)
- Stance: Orthodox
- Team: Sitsongpeenong & Chokmuay Belgium/NAPOLI GYM BELGIUM (2014-present) Sitsongpeenong(2011-2014); Kaewsamrit Gym (2009-2011); Sor Udomson (1999-2009); Rungrapa Gym (1997-1999)
- Years active: c. 1997–2015

Kickboxing record
- Total: 139
- Wins: 86
- By knockout: 53
- Losses: 51
- Draws: 2

Piyapong Chuanpo (Thai: พีระพงษ์ ชวนโพธิ์; born January 21, 1984), known professionally as Bovy Sor.Udomson (Thai: โบวี่ ส.อุดมศร), is a retired Thai professional Muay Thai fighter and kickboxer. He is a former Rajadamnern Stadium Super Bantamweight Champion who was active during the 2000s and 2010s. He was especially known for his iron chin and brawling fighting style.

== Biography and career ==
Bovy Sor Udomson was born as Piyapong Chuanpo in Kalasin Province in Northeastern (Isan) region of Thailand. He had his first fight at the age of 13.

He later fought out of Chokmuay Belgium, in Belgium but still trained in Sitsongpeenong Gym in Bangkok.

He defeated Akihiro Gono via TKO (referee stoppage) in round one at Shootboxing 2012 - Act 4 on September 17, 2012, in Tokyo, Japan to qualify for the 2012 S-Cup.

He competed at the Shoot Boxing World Tournament 2012 in Tokyo, Japan on November 17, 2012 where he lost a majority decision (29-29, 30-29, 30-29) against Henri van Opstal at the quarter-final stage.

He defeated Victor Nagbe to win the Muay Thai Warriors Super Welterweight (69 kg) title in Macau on December 9, 2012.

He lost to Warren Stevelmans by way of majority decision at Shootboxing 2013 - Act 1 in Tokyo on February 22, 2013.

He lost to Hiroaki Suzuki by unanimous decision at Shootboxing 2013 - Act 4 in Tokyo, Japan on September 23, 2013.

He lost to Kuniyoshi Hironaka by second-round KO at Shoot Boxing Battle Summit Ground Zero Tokyo 2013 in Tokyo, Japan on November 15, 2013.

Charleville Meziere in France on mei 17, 2014. No contest because of a fight in the audience during the 5th round and 3rd count against Mohamed Galaoui, the officials did not gave a decision, is he first fight for Chokmuay Belgium

He is now a trainer in Taipei, Taiwan since 2019.

== Titles and accomplishments ==
- Muay Thai Warriors
  - 2012 Muay Thai Warriors Super Welterweight (154 lbs) Champion
- OneSongchai Promotions
  - 2009 S1 Battle Lightweight (135 lbs) Champion
- World Muaythai Council
  - 2005 WMC Lightweight (135 lbs) Champion
- Professional Boxing Association of Thailand
  - Thailand Featherweight (126 lbs) Champion
  - Thailand Super Bantamweight (122 lbs) Champion
- Rajadamnern Stadium
  - 2003 Rajadamnern Stadium Super Bantamweight (122 lbs) Champion

== Fight record ==
Kickboxing record
86 Wins (53 (T)KO's, 22 decisions), 51 Losses, 2 Draws
Date	Result	Opponent	Event	Location	Method	Round	Time
2015-10-24	Loss	(China) Qiu Jianliang	WLF 2015	Hong Kong, China	KO(Knee)	1	
2015-01-31	Loss	(China) Qiu Jianliang	Wu Lin Feng World Championship 2015	Chongqing, China	Decision (unanimous)	3	3:00
2014-11-30	Loss	(Netherlands) Zakaria Zouggary	SHOOT BOXING WORLD TOURNAMENT S-cup 2014, Quarter Final	Tokyo, Japan	KO	2	0:20
2014-05-17	NC	(France) Mohamed Galaoui	Radikal Fight France		No contest	5	2:30
2013-11-15	Loss	(Japan) Kuniyoshi Hironaka	Shoot Boxing Battle Summit Ground Zero Tokyo 2013	Tokyo, Japan	KO (right cross)	2	
2013-09-23	Loss	(Japan) Hiroaki Suzuki	Shootboxing 2013 - Act 4	Tokyo, Japan	Decision (unanimous)	3	3:00
2013-02-22	Loss	(South Africa) Warren Stevelmans	Shootboxing 2013 - Act 1	Tokyo, Japan	Decision (majority)	3	3:00
2012-12-09	Win	(Australia) Victor Nagbe	Muay Thai Warriors	Macau			
Wins the Muay Thai Warriors Super Welterweight (154 lbs) title.
2012-11-17	Loss	(Netherlands) Henri van Opstal	Shoot Boxing World Tournament 2012, Quarter Finals	Tokyo, Japan	Decision (majority)	3	3:00
2012-09-17	Win	(Japan) Akihiro Gono	Shootboxing 2012 - Act 4	Tokyo, Japan	TKO (referee stoppage)	1	2:15
2012-05-27	Loss	(Morocco) Faldir Chahbari	SLAMM: Nederland vs. Thailand VII	Almere, Netherlands	Decision	5	3:00
2012-03-24	Loss	(Belarus) Chingiz Allazov	Oktagon - Fight Code 2012	Milan, Italy	KO	1	
2012-02-05	Loss	(Japan) Satoru Suzuki	Shootboxing 2012 - Act 1	Tokyo, Japan	Decision (Unanimous)	3	3:00
2011-11-06	Win	(Armenia) Gago Drago	Shoot the Shooto 2011	Tokyo, Japan	Decision (Unanimous)	3	3:00
2011-09-10	Win	(United States) Toby Imada	Shootboxing 2011 - Act 4	Tokyo, Japan	Decision (Unanimous)	3	3:00
2011-08-27	Loss	(Switzerland) Paulo Balicha	Swiss Las Vegas Challenge 4	Basel, Switzerland	Decision	3	3:00
2011-05-07	Loss	(Morocco) Hichem Chaibi	Fight Zone 5	Villeurbanne, France	Decision	5	3:00
2011-02-19	Loss	(Japan) Hiroki Shishido	Shoot Boxing 2011 act.1 -SB166-	Korakuen Hall, Japan	Decision (Unanimous)	5	3:00
2011-01-21	Loss	(France) Antuan Siangboxing	Channel 3	Suphanburi, Thailand	Decision	5	3:00
Fight was for W.P.M.F. World Super Welterweight (154 lbs) Muaythai title.
2010-11-23	Loss	(Netherlands) Andy Souwer	Shoot Boxing Tournament 2010, Quarter-final	Bunkyō, Japan	KO (Right hook)	3	0:47
2010-06-04	Win	(France) Moussa Konaté	Ultimate Thai V / Muyathaitv Trophy	Paris, France	Decision	5	3:00
2010-04-11	Win	(Japan) Takaaki Umeno	Shootboxing 25th Anniversary : Ishin 2	Tokyo, Japan	TKO (Referee Stoppage)	2	
2010-03-27	Loss	(England) Michael Dicks	England Vs Thailand 2010	Manchester, England	Decision	5	3:00
2009-11-29	Loss	(Morocco) Mosab Amrani	SLAMM!! Netherlands vs Thailand VI	Almere, Netherlands	KO	1	
For the WMC Intercontinental Super Lightweight (140 lbs) title.
2009-11-07	Win	(Slovakia) Rudolf Durica	Thai Boxe	Padova, Italy	Decision	5	3:00
2009-09-04	Win	(Japan) Hiroki Shishido	Shootboxing 2009 -Bushido-	Tokyo, Japan	KO (Right hook)	5	0:34
2009-06-20	Draw	(France) Kamel Jemel	Muaythai Gala in Levallois	Levallois, France	Decision draw	5	3:00
2009-06-08	Win	(Thailand) Nopparat Keatkhamtorn	Suek Wansongchai, Rajadamnern Stadium	Bangkok, Thailand	Decision	5	3:00
2009-05-09	Win	(France) Mickael Piscitello	Thai Tournament III	Geneva, Switzerland	TKO (Referee Stoppage)	4	
2009-05-02	Win	(Thailand) Puja Sor.Suwanee	One Songchai Promotions	Thailand	Decision	5	3:00
Wins the S1 Battle Lightweight (135 lbs) title.
2009-03-26	Loss	(France) Fabio Pinca	Les Stars du Ring	Levallois, France	Decision	5	3:00
2009-03-06		(Thailand) Nopparat Keatkhamtorn	Onesongchai	Maha Sarakham Province, Thailand			
2009-01-18	Win	(Iran) Vahid Rosyani	M.I.D. Japan presents "Thailand Japan" 2009	Japan	TKO	5	
2008-12-18	Loss	(Thailand) Petsanguan Sitniwat	Onesongchai, Rajadamnern Stadium	Bangkok, Thailand	Decision	5	3:00
2008-11-30	Win	(Morocco) Rachid Belaini	SLAMM!! Netherlands vs Thailand V	Almere, Netherlands	TKO (Cut)	1	
2008-08-28	Win	(Thailand) Singtongnoi Por.Telakun	Onesongchai, Rajadamnern Stadium	Bangkok, Thailand	TKO	3	
2008-07-21	Loss	(Thailand) Phettho Sitjaopor	Phetthongkam, Rajadamnern Stadium	Bangkok, Thailand	Decision	5	3:00
2008-06-02	Loss	(Thailand) Pethsanguan	Onesongchai - Channel 7	Bangkok, Thailand	Decision	5	3:00
2008-02-07	Win	(Thailand) Lamthong Tor Pornchai	Wanthongchai Fights, Rajadamnern Stadium	Bangkok, Thailand	Decision	5	3:00
2007-11-24	Win	(Thailand) Nopparat Keatkhamtorn	Sukonesongchai Loi Krathong Superfights	Nonthaburi, Thailand	KO	3	
2007-	Loss	(Thailand) Nongbee Kiatyongyut	Rajadamnern Stadium	Bangkok, Thailand	Decision	5	3:00
2007-06-25	Win	(Thailand) Saenchainoi Wor.Petchpoon	Onesongchai, Rajadamnern Stadium	Bangkok, Thailand	Decision	5	3:00
2007-05-10	Win	(Thailand) Singtongnoi Por.Telakun	Boxing Fight	Bangkok, Thailand	Decision (Unanimous)	8	
2007-03-08	Win	(Thailand) Yodsanan 3K Battery	Wansongchai Fights, Rajadamnern Stadium	Bangkok, Thailand	Decision	5	3:00
2006-10-19	Win	(Thailand) Rungrueangchai Daosiburi	Onesongchai, Rajadamnern Stadium	Bangkok, Thailand	Decision	5	3:00
2006-08-31	Loss	(Thailand) Watanasak Lukkuntara	Onesongchai, Rajadamnern Stadium	Bangkok, Thailand	Decision	5	3:00
2006-07-05	Loss	(Thailand) Watanaska Lukgantra	Onesongchai, Rajadamnern Stadium	Bangkok, Thailand	Decision	5	3:00
2006-05-08	Win	(Thailand) Singtongnoi Por.Telakun	Onesongchai, Rajadamnern Stadium	Bangkok, Thailand	Decision	5	3:00
2006-04-06	Loss	(Thailand) Singtongnoi Por.Telakun	Onesongchai, Rajadamnern Stadium	Bangkok, Thailand	Decision	5	3:00
2006-	Loss	(Thailand) Phetek Kiatyongyut	Onesongchai, Rajadamnern Stadium	Bangkok, Thailand	TKO (Referee Stoppage)	1	
2005-11-16	Loss	(Thailand) Orono Tawan	Onesongchai, Rajadamnern Stadium	Bangkok, Thailand	TKO	4	
2005-09-22	Loss	(Thailand) Saenchainoi Saendetgym	Onesongchai, Rajadamnern Stadium	Bangkok, Thailand	Decision	5	3:00
2005-09-02	Win	(Thailand) Suahuanlek Chor.Sophipong	Rajadamnern Stadium	Bangkok, Thailand	TKO	1	
Wins the WMC World Featherweight (126 lbs) title.
2005-08-12	Loss	(Thailand) Ronnachai Naratreekul	Queens Birthday Superfights	Bangkok, Thailand	Decision	5	3:00
2005-06-22	Win	(Thailand) Phetek Kiatyongyut	Kiatsingnoi, Rajadamnern Stadium	Bangkok, Thailand	KO (Elbow)	3	
2005-03-07	Loss	(Thailand) Yodbuangam Lukbanyai	Onesongchai, Rajadamnern Stadium	Bangkok, Thailand	TKO	2	
2005-02-12	Win	(Thailand) Phetek Kiatyongyut	OneSongchai Tsunami Show, Rajamangala Stadium	Bangkok, Thailand	TKO (Elbow)	3	
2004-12-29	Win	(Thailand) Rungravee Sor.Rungrot	Onesongchai, Rajadamnern Stadium	Bangkok, Thailand	TKO	5	
2004-11-01	Win	(Thailand) Rungravee 13Reanexpress	Onesongchai, Rajadamnern Stadium	Bangkok, Thailand	Decision	5	3:00
2004-09-27	Loss	(Thailand) Saenchai Sor Kingstar	Onesongchai, Rajadamnern Stadium	Bangkok, Thailand	TKO	4	
2004-09-02	Win	(Thailand) Serhuanlak Chor.Sopipong	Onesongchai, Rajadamnern Stadium	Bangkok, Thailand	TKO	1	
2004-06-03	Win	(Thailand) Wanmechai Menayotin	Onesongchai, Rajadamnern Stadium	Bangkok, Thailand	Decision	5	3:00
2003-11-27	Loss	(Thailand) Serhuanlak Chor.Sopipong	Onesongchai, Rajadamnern Stadium	Bangkok, Thailand	Decision	5	3:00
2003-10-30	Loss	(Thailand) Puja Sor.Suwanee	Onesongchai, Rajadamnern Stadium	Bangkok, Thailand	Decision	5	3:00
2003-10-05	Win	(Thailand) Kairung Sor.Sasipagym	Onesongchai, Rajadamnern Stadium	Bangkok, Thailand	Decision	5	3:00
2003-09-07	Win	(Thailand) Petchto Sitjaopor	Onesongchai, Rajadamnern Stadium	Bangkok, Thailand	Decision	5	3:00
2003-08-08	Loss	(China) Kang YongGang	The 4th China kung fu VS vocational muay Thai	Bangkok, Thailand	Decision (Unanimous)	5	3:00
2003-07-20	Loss	(Thailand) Puja Sor.Suwanee	Onesongchai, Rajadamnern Stadium	Bangkok, Thailand	Decision	5	3:00
2003-06-23		(Thailand) Ronnachai Naratreekul	Onesongchai + Petchthongkam, Rajadamnern Stadium	Bangkok, Thailand			
2003-04-26	Draw	(Thailand) Ronnachai Naratreekul	OneSongchai	Chachoengsao Province, Thailand	Decision	5	3:00
2003-03-03	Loss	(Thailand) Phet-Ek Sitjaopho	Kiatsingnoi, Rajadamnern Stadium	Bangkok, Thailand	KO	1	
2002-12-	Win	(Thailand) Kongprai Por.Pinyo	Rajadamnern Stadium	Bangkok, Thailand	KO	3	
2002-11-	Loss	(Thailand) Kongprai Por.Pinyo	Rajadamnern Stadium	Bangkok, Thailand	Decision	5	3:00
2002-10-09	Win	(Thailand) Ngathao Attharungroj	Rajadamnern Stadium	Bangkok, Thailand	Decision	5	3:00
2002-	Win	(Thailand) Paruhat Sitchamee	Rajadamnern Stadium	Bangkok, Thailand	Decision	5	3:00
2002-	Win	(Thailand) Paruhat Sitchamee	Rajadamnern Stadium	Bangkok, Thailand	Decision	5	3:00
2002-	Win	(Thailand) Khrunoi Sor.kingstar	Rajadamnern Stadium	Bangkok, Thailand	Decision	5	3:00
2002-05-21	Loss	(Thailand) Anuwat Kaewsamrit	Onesongchai	Bangkok, Thailand	TKO (Referee Stoppage)	3	
2002-04-22	Loss	(Thailand) Klairung Sor.Sasipagym	Rajadamnern Stadium	Bangkok, Thailand	Decision	5	3:00
2002-03-20	Win	(Thailand) Wuttidet Lukprabat	Rajadamnern Stadium	Bangkok, Thailand	Decision	5	3:00
2002-	Win	(Thailand) Taweesak Singklongsi	Rajadamnern Stadium	Bangkok, Thailand	Decision	5	3:00
2001-	Win	(Thailand) Kongprai Por.Pinyo	Rajadamnern Stadium	Thailand	KO	3	
2001-11-07	Loss	(Thailand) Pornsanae Sitmonchai	Rajadamnern Stadium	Thailand	Decision	5	3:00
2001-	Loss	(Thailand) Kongprai Por.Pinyo	Rajadamnern Stadium	Thailand	Decision	5	3:00
2001-09-05	Loss	(Thailand) Thongchai Tor. Silachai	Rajadamnern Stadium	Thailand	Decision	5	3:00
2001-07-12	Loss	(Thailand) Thongchai Tor. Silachai	Rajadamnern Stadium	Thailand	Decision	5	3:00
2001-06-07	Win	(Thailand) Puja Sor.Suwanee	Rajadamnern Stadium	Thailand	KO	2	
2001-	Win	(Thailand) Rungrit Sitchamtong	Rajadamnern Stadium	Bangkok, Thailand	Decision	5	3:00
2001-	Win	(Thailand) Chomputong Kiatniwat	Rajadamnern Stadium	Bangkok, Thailand	KO	4	
2001-	Win	(Thailand) Chanalert Yuthakij	Rajadamnern Stadium	Bangkok, Thailand	Decision	5	3:00
2001-	Win	(Thailand) Thepparat Sakjawee	Rajadamnern Stadium	Bangkok, Thailand	Decision	5	3:00
	Win	(Thailand) Palangchai		Thailand			
	Win	(Thailand) Seanchainoi Seandeatgym		Thailand			
	Win	(Thailand) Yodsanan Sityodtong		Thailand			
Legend: Win Loss Draw/No contest Notes

== See also ==
- List of male kickboxers
