= Anuwat Kaewsamrit =

Thai former professional Muay Thai fighter

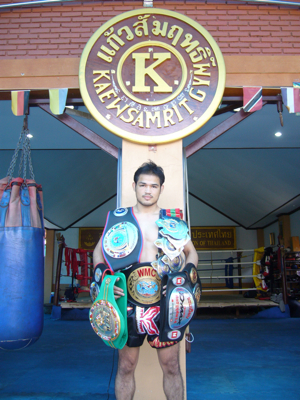
- Born: Apisak Rongpichai; November 17, 1981 (age 44); Chawang, (now Chang Klang), Nakhon Si Thammarat, Thailand
- Nickname: The Iron Hands of Siam; Curled-Eyelash Executioner (เพชรฆาตขนตางอน); Jok (โจ๊ก)
- Height: 165 cm (5 ft 5 in)
- Division: Mini Flyweight; Light Flyweight; Flyweight; Bantamweight; Featherweight; Lightweight; Super Lightweight
- Style: Muay Thai (Muay Mat / Muay Bouk)
- Stance: Orthodox
- Team: Kaewsamrit Gym (Fighter); Impax Academy (Coach)
- Trainer: Terdtoon Kiatkanchai
- Years active: c. 1994–2010

Kickboxing record
- Total: 152
- Wins: 108
- By knockout: 61
- Losses: 38
- Draws: 6

Anuwat Kaewsamrit
Medal record

Representing Thailand

Men's Wushu

Southeast Asian Games
Bronze medal – third place	2009 Vientianne	56 kg

Asian Martial Arts Games
Silver medal – second place	2009 Bangkok	56 kg

Apisak Rongpichai (Thai: ???; born November 17, 1981), known professionally as Anuwat Kaewsamrit (Thai: อนุวัฒน์ แก้วสัมฤทธิ์), is a Thai former professional Muay Thai fighter. He is a one-time Lumpinee Stadium champion and four-time Rajadamnern Stadium champion across four divisions, as well as the 2003 and 2004 Sports Writers Association of Thailand Fighter of the Year, who was famous in the 1990s and 2000s. Nicknamed "The Iron Hands of Siam", he was known for his powerful and technical punching ability. Now he's currently the head coach of Impax Academy Thailand.

== Biography ==
=== Early life ===
Anuwat Kaewsamrit was born as Apisak Rongpichai in Nakhon Si Thammarat province in the south of Thailand on November 17, 1981. At the age of 13, he went to Bangkok to stay with a friend, who was training at the newly formed Kaewsamrit camp. At first, Anuwat was a gym assistant, but decided to join the gym as a trainee. After his first 6 month training period, he had his first fight at the age of 14 in Pattaya.

On October 31, 1998, when he was 17 years old, he had his first foreign bout against Hinari Fukatsu who was the current Japanese national champion of SNKA at flyweight in Japan. He knocked down Fukatsu twice in the 4th round and twice in 5th round. The referee stopped the bout at the second knock down in 5th round.

=== Winning national titles ===
Two years later, after 35 fights, he the got chance to fight for his first stadium title. On November 18, 1998, Anuwat knocked out Klangsuan Sasiprapa Gym in the 4th round and he won the Rajadamnern Stadium title at Mini flyweight (105 lb, 47.727 kg).

On June 10, 1999, he won his second title by beating Kayasit Sakmuangklaeng for the Rajadamnern Stadium title at Junior flyweight. Anuwat's reputation grew, and he made a name for himself as a fighter who had the ability to come from behind to snatch the victory, usually by way of his devastating punches.

On February 2, 2000, Anuwat won his 3rd title in his career, beating Prakaipetch Kiatpailin to take the Rajadamnern Stadium title at Junior bantamweight.

On May 6, 2005, Anuwat fought against Nopparat Keatkhamtorn who was the current champion of Lumpinee Stadium at Featherweight to unify the titles. He knocked out Nopparat with a right cross in the 1st round, and won the Lumpinee Stadium title, becoming the unified champion of Rajadamnern Stadium and Lumpinee Stadium at featherweight. He was the first to do so in the history of Thailand.

On October 29, 2005, Anuwat fought against Riki Onodera who was the featherweight champion of Japan in Japan for Onodera's retirement bout. He knocked down Onodera at the end of 1st round with a right elbow strike. In the 2nd round, he knocked down Onodera twice, once with a left hook and once with a right low kick, and the referee stopped the bout when Anuwat knocked down Onodera at 3rd time with a right hook.

=== Winning world titles ===
In 2005, World Boxing Council (WBC) established new championships of Muay Thai and Anuwat was offered for its title. He fought against Singtongnoi Por.Telakun for the vacant first WBC Muay Thai title at featherweight on October 19, 2006. He won his first world title in his career with TKO in 3rd round.

On August 22, 2008, he fought against Santipab Sit. Au. Ubon at Lumpinee Stadium for the vacant title of WPMF World featherweight title. He won by split decision at 5R.

On March 1, 2009, he had a defending match against Shunta from Japan for WPMF World Featherweight title in the event of "M.I.D Japan presents M-1 Fairtex Muay Thai Challenge 2009 Yod Nak Suu vol.1". He knocked down Shunta with a left hook in the 1st round and the referee stopped the bout when Anuwat knocked down Shunta with a right hook.

On June 26, in Montego Bay, Jamaica, Anuwat challenged Liam Harrison's WMC World Lightweight title, and won by TKO of the third round with right low kicks.

On July 11, 2010, in Ariake, Tokyo, Anuwat was scheduled to defend his WPMF Featherweight title against Shin Saenchigym from Japan. He scored a knockout with a right cross in 5th round, retaining his title.

== Titles and accomplishments ==
- Rajadamnern Stadium
  - 1998 Rajadamnern Mini Flyweight (105 lbs) Champion
  - 1999 Rajadamnern Light Flyweight (108 lbs) Champion
  - 1999 Rajadamnern Super Flyweight (115 lbs) Champion
  - 2003 Rajadamnern Featherweight (126 lbs) Champion
    - Two successful title defenses
  - 2004 Rajadamnern Stadium Fighter of the Year
  - 2004 Rajadamnern Stadium Fight of the Year (vs. Seanchernglak Jirakrengkrai)
  - 2010 Rajadamnern Super Featherweight (130 lbs) Champion
- World Muaythai Council
  - 2009 WMC World Lightweight (135 lbs) Champion
- Lumpinee Stadium
  - 2005 Lumpinee Featherweight (126 lbs) Champion
- Onesongchai Promotion
  - S1 World Featherweight (126 lbs) Champion
- World Professional Muaythai Federation
  - 2008 WPMF World Featherweight (126 lbs) Champion
- World Boxing Council MuayThai
  - 2006 WBC MuayThai World Featherweight (126 lbs) Champion
- Omnoi Stadium
  - 2004 Omnoi Stadium Super Bantamweight (126 lbs) Champion
  - 2004 14th Isuzu Cup Tournament Winner

=== Awards ===
- 2005 Sports Authority of Thailand Fighter of the Year
- 2004 Sports Authority of Thailand Fighter of the Year
- 2004 Sports Writers Association of Thailand Fight of the Year (vs Singdam Kiatmuu9)
- 2004 Sports Writers Association of Thailand Fighter of the Year
- 2003 Sports Writers Association of Thailand Fighter of the Year

== Fight record ==
Kickboxing record
108 Wins, 38 Losses, 6 Draws
Date	Result	Opponent	Event	Location	Method	Round	Time
2010-10-03	Loss	(Japan) Kan Itabashi	KGS "RISE 71"	Bunkyō, Tokyo, Japan	Decision (Unanimous)	4(Ex.1)	3:00
2010-07-11	Win	(Japan) Shin Saenchaigym	NJKF "Muay Thai Open 12"	Kōtō, Tokyo, Japan	KO (Right cross)	5	0:33
Defends the WPMF World Featherweight (126 lbs) title.
2010-07-03	Loss	(Australia) Kurt Finlayson	Detonation 7	Australia	Decision (Split)	5	3:00
For the WMC M.A.D. World Super Lightweight (140 lbs) title.
2010-05-29	Loss	(Suriname) Sergio Wielzen	Muaythai event in Geneva (135lbs)	Geneva, Switzerland	KO (Right high kick)	1	0:30
2010-03-27	Loss	(United Kingdom) Liam Harrison	MSA Muaythai Premier League (140lbs)	Manchester, England	Decision (Unanimous)	5	3:00
2010-03-01	Win	(Thailand) Kompayak Beemdesign	Daorungchujaroen Fights, Rajadamnern Stadium	Bangkok, Thailand	Decision (Unanimous)	5	3:00
Wins the Rajadamnern Super Featherweight (130 lbs) title.
2010-01-30	Loss	(Thailand) Sitthichai Sitsongpeenong	La Nuit Des Titans	Tours, France	Decision (Unanimous)	3	3:00
For the La Nuit Des Titans Super Lightweight (140 lbs) Tournament title.
2010-01-30	Win	(France) Houcine Bennoui	La Nuit Des Titans	Tours, France	Decision (Unanimous)	3	3:00
2009-11-29	Loss	(Morocco) Mohammed Khamal	SLAMM "Nederland vs Thailand VI"	Almere, Netherlands	Decision (Unanimous)	5	3:00
For the WMC Intercontinental Super Lightweight (140 lbs) title.
2009-11-06	Loss	(Thailand) Yodsuper Purnrattana	Rajadamnern Stadium	Bangkok, Thailand	Decision	5	3:00
2009-10-12	Win	(Thailand) Wuttidet Lukprabat	Muaythai Open 9: Road to Real King XIII	Japan	KO (Right punch)	3	
2009-10-01	Loss	(Thailand) Mongkonchai Petsuphapan	Rajadamnern Stadium	Bangkok, Thailand	Decision	5	3:00
2009-08-31	Win	(Thailand) Fahmai Skindewgym	Rajadamnern Stadium	Bangkok, Thailand	TKO	5	
2009-06-26	Win	(United Kingdom) Liam Harrison	Champions of Champions 2	Montego Bay, Jamaica	TKO (Right low kicks)	3	0:35
Wins the WMC Lightweight (135 lbs) World title.
2009-04-30	Loss	(Thailand) Sagetdao Petpayathai	Daorungchujarean Fights, Rajadamnern Stadium	Bangkok, Thailand	Decision	5	3:00
For the Rajadamnern Featherweight (126 lbs) title.
2009-03-26	Win	(France) Kamel Jemel	Les Stars du Ring 2009	Levallois-Perret, France	KO (Body shot)	1	
2009-02-12	Win	(Thailand) Kompayak Beemdesign	Jarummueang Fights, Rajadamnern Stadium	Bangkok, Thailand	Decision	5	3:00
2009-03-01	Win	(Japan) Shunta	M-1 Fairtex Muay Thai 2009 "Yod Nak Suu vol.1"	Japan	TKO (Right hook)	1	2:05
Defends the WPMF World Featherweight (126 lbs) Champion.
2008-11-30	Loss	(Morocco) Mosab Amrani	SLAMM "Nederland vs Thailand V"	Almere, Netherlands	TKO (Doctor stoppage/cut)	4	1:52
For WMC World Super Lightweight (140 lbs) title.
2008-10-02	Win	(Thailand) Phet-Ek Sitjaopho	Daorungchujarean, Rajadamnern Stadium	Bangkok, Thailand	KO (Left hook to the body)	3	
2008-08-22	Win	(Thailand) Santipab Sit. Au. Ubon	Eminent Air, Lumpinee Stadium	Bangkok, Thailand	Decision (Split)	5	3:00
Wins the WPMF World Featherweight (126 lbs) Champion.
2008-07-31	Loss	(Thailand) Jomthong Chuwattana	Daorungchujarern, Rajadamnern Stadium	Bangkok, Thailand	Decision (Unanimous)	5	3:00
Loses the WBC MuayThai World Featherweight (126 lbs) title.
2008-06-12	Win	(United Kingdom) Imran Khan		Levallois-Perret, France	Decision (Unanimous)	5	3:00
2008-05-01	Win	(Thailand) Phandin Sor Damrongrit	Daorungchujarern, Rajadamnern Stadium	Bangkok, Thailand	TKO	3	
2008-03-31	Loss	(Thailand) Chok Eminentair	Daorungchujarern, Rajadamnern Stadium	Bangkok, Thailand	Decision	5	3:00
2008-03-03	Draw	(Morocco) Hassan Ait Bassou	SLAMM "Nederland vs Thailand IV" (140lbs)	Almere, Netherlands	Decision	5	3:00
2008-01-24	Win	(Thailand) Phetasawin Seatranferry	Daorungchujarern, Rajadamnern Stadium	Bangkok, Thailand	Decision	5	3:00
2007-12-20	Loss	(Thailand) Lerdsila Chumpairtour	Daorungchujarern, Rajadamnern Stadium	Bangkok, Thailand	Decision	5	3:00
2007-10-27	Win	(France) Mustapha Benshimed	One Night in Bangkok	Antwerp, Belgium	KO		
2007-08-24	Loss	(Thailand) Nong-O Sit.Or	Lumpinee Stadium	Bangkok, Thailand	Decision	5	3:00
2007-08-02	Win	(Thailand) Traijak Sitjomtrai	Rajadamnern Stadium	Bangkok, Thailand	Decision	5	3:00
2007-07-05	Win	(Thailand) Chalermdet Sor.Tawanrung	Daowrungchujarern, Rajadamnern Stadium	Bangkok, Thailand	Decision	5	3:00
2007-05-19	Loss	(Thailand) Phet-Ek Sitjaopho	Omnoi Stadium	Samut Sakhon, Thailand	Decision	5	3:00
For the vacant Omnoi Stadium Featherweight (126 lbs) title.
2007-05-06	Win	(Morocco) Hassan Ait Bassou	SLAMM "Nederland vs Thailand III" (137lbs)	Haarlem, Netherlands	KO (Right hook)	2	1:04
2007-04-06	Win	(Thailand) Sarawut Lookbanyai	Phetsupapan, Lumpinee Stadium	Bangkok, Thailand	Decision	5	3:00
2007-03-08	Win	(Thailand) Singtongnoi Por.Telakun	Onesongchai, Rajadamnern Stadium	Bangkok, Thailand	Decision	5	3:00
2007-02-02	Win	(Thailand) Ronnachai Naratreekul	Sor.Khunsuktrakoonyang, Lumpinee Stadium	Bangkok, Thailand	Decision	5	3:00
2006-12-21	Draw	(Thailand) Jomthong Chuwattana	Birthday Show, Rajadamnern Stadium	Bangkok, Thailand	Decision	5	3:00
2006-11-16	Loss	(Thailand) Jomthong Chuwattana	Rajadamnern Stadium	Bangkok, Thailand	Decision	5	3:00
For the Rajadamnern Featherweight (126 lbs) title.
2006-10-19	Win	(Thailand) Singtongnoi Por.Telakun	Onesongchai, Rajadamnern Stadium	Bangkok, Thailand	TKO (Right cross)	3	
Wins the WBC Muaythai World Featherweight (126 lbs) title.
2006-09-04	Draw	(Thailand) Singtongnoi Por.Telakun	Daorungchujaroen, Rajadamnern Stadium	Bangkok, Thailand	Decision	5	3:00
For the vacant Rajadamnern Featherweight (126 lbs) title.
2006-07-28	Loss	(Thailand) Ronnachai Naratreekul	Khunsuk Takoonyang, Lumpinee Stadium	Bangkok, Thailand	Decision	5	3:00
2006-07-05	Loss	(Thailand) Puja Sor.Suwanee	Wansongchai, Rajadamnern Stadium	Bangkok, Thailand	Decision (Unanimous)	5	3:00
2006-05-13	Win	(Algeria) Mhand Boukedim	Le Thaï Tournament II : France vs Thaïlande (130lbs)	Genève, Switzerland	KO (Right cross)	1	
2006-04-06	Loss	(Thailand) Nongbee Kiatyongyut	Onesongchai, Rajadamnern Stadium	Bangkok, Thailand	TKO (Knees)	4	
2006-03-06	Win	(Thailand) Saenchainoi Nongkeesuwit	Onesongchai, Rajadamnern Stadium	Bangkok, Thailand	KO (Right uppercut to the body)	3	
2006-01-25	Win	(Thailand) Puja Sor.Suwanee	Daorungchujarean, Rajadamnern Stadium	Bangkok, Thailand	Decision	5	3:00
2005-12-22	Win	(Thailand) Orono Tawan	60th Anniversary, Rajadamnern Stadium	Bangkok, Thailand	TKO	3	
2005-11-16	Loss	(Thailand) Saenchainoi Nongkeesuwit	Onesongchai, Rajadamnern Stadium	Bangkok, Thailand	Decision	5	3:00
2005-10-29	Win	(Japan) Riki Onodera	SNKA "Onodera Riki Retirement Memorial Event" (132lbs)	Ōta, Tokyo, Japan	KO (Right hook)	2	2:18
2005-09-22	Win	(Thailand) Ronnachai Naratreekul	Onesongchai, Rajadamnern Stadium	Bangkok, Thailand	TKO (High kick)	3	
2005-08-12	Win	(Thailand) Thongchai Tor.Silachai	Queens Birthday Superfights, Sanam Luang	Bangkok, Thailand	Decision (Unanimous)	5	3:00
2005-07-20	Loss	(Thailand) Nongbee Kiatyongyut	Daorungchujarean, Rajadamnern Stadium	Bangkok, Thailand	Decision	5	3:00
2005-06-22	Loss	(Thailand) Attachai Nor.Siripung	Onesongchai + Kiatsingnoi, Rajadamnern Stadium	Bangkok, Thailand	Decision	5	3:00
2005-05-06	Win	(Thailand) Nopparat Keatkhamtorn	Phetyindee + Kor.Sapaotong, Lumpinee Stadium	Bangkok, Thailand	KO (Right cross)	1	1:51
Wins the Lumpinee Featherweight (126 lbs) title and defends the Rajadamnern Featherweight (126 lbs) title.
2005-03-26	Win	(Thailand) Ngathao Attharungroj	Palokmuaythai ITV, Omnoi Stadium	Bangkok, Thailand	KO (Right cross)	2	
2005-02-28	Win	(Thailand) Wuttidet Lukprabat	Daorungprabath, Rajadamnern Stadium	Bangkok, Thailand	Decision	5	3:00
2005-01-26	Win	(Thailand) Lerdsila Chumpairtour	Daorungchujarean, Rajadamnern Stadium	Bangkok, Thailand	KO (Right cross)	4	
2004-12-23	Win	(Thailand) Rittidet Kor.Sapaothong	Daorungchujarean, Rajadamnern Stadium	Bangkok, Thailand	KO (Left hook)	4	
2004-11-29	Win	(Thailand) Saenchernglek Jirakriangkrai	Daorungchujarean, Rajadamnern Stadium	Bangkok, Thailand	Decision	5	3:00
2004-10-25	Win	(Thailand) Puja Sor.Suwanee	Palokmuaythai ITV, Omnoi Stadium	Bangkok, Thailand	KO (Right cross)	2	
2004-09-06	Loss	(Thailand) Saenchernglek Jirakriangkrai	Daorungchujarean, Rajadamnern Stadium	Bangkok, Thailand	Decision	5	3:00
2004-06-17	Win	(Thailand) Kongpipop Petchyindee	Daorungchujarean, Rajadamnern Stadium	Bangkok, Thailand	TKO (Leg kicks)	2	
2004-05-04	Win	(Thailand) Singdam Kiatmoo9	Petchyindee, Lumpinee Stadium	Bangkok, Thailand	KO (Right cross)	3	
2004-03-28	Win	(Thailand) Duewa Kongudom	Omnoi Stadium, Isuzu Cup tournament, Final	Bangkok, Thailand	Decision	5	3:00
Wins the 14th Isuzu Cup and Omnoi Stadium Super Bantamweight (122 lbs) title.
2004-	Win	(Thailand) Ronnachai Naratreekul	Omnoi Stadium, Isuzu Cup tournament, Semifinal	Bangkok, Thailand	KO (Right cross)	2	
2003-11-15	Loss	(Thailand) Duewa Kongudom	Omnoi Stadium, Isuzu Cup tournament	Bangkok, Thailand	Decision	5	3:00
2003-10-18	Win	(Thailand) Sakornphet NakhonthongParkView	Omnoi Stadium, Isuzu Cup tournament	Bangkok, Thailand	TKO (Punches)	2	
2003-09-06	Win	(Thailand) Sayannoi Kiatpraphat	Omnoi Stadium, Isuzu Cup tournament	Bangkok, Thailand	Decision	5	3:00
2003-08-06	Win	(Thailand) Muangfahlek Kiatwichian	Daorungchujarean, Rajadamnern Stadium	Bangkok, Thailand	KO (Right cross)	3	
Defends the Rajadamnern Featherweight (126 lbs) title.
2003-07-29	Win	(Thailand) Nopparat Keatkhamtorn	DFD CommonReal3000 & Petchyindee, Lumpinee Stadium	Bangkok, Thailand	TKO	1	
2003-06-13	Draw	(Thailand) Pornpitak Petchaudomchai	Petchpiya, Lumpinee Stadium	Bangkok, Thailand	Decision	5	3:00
2003-04-30	Win	(Thailand) Singdam Kiatmoo9	Daorungchujarean, Rajadamnern Stadium	Bangkok, Thailand	KO (Right cross)	3	
2003-03-14	Draw	(Thailand) Ritthichai Somkidkarnka	Phetburapha, Lumpinee Stadium	Bangkok, Thailand	Decision	5	3:00
2003-02-05	Win	(Thailand) Muangfahlek Kiatwichian	Daorungchujarean, Rajadamnern Stadium	Bangkok, Thailand	Decision (Unanimous)	5	3:00
Wins the Rajadamnern Featherweight (126 lbs) title.
2003-01-10	Win	(Thailand) Chatri Sithengjia	Praianan, Lumpinee Stadium	Bangkok, Thailand	Decision	5	3:00
2002-12-03	Win	(Thailand) Yodbuangam Lukbanyai	Petchyindee, Rajadamnern Stadium	Bangkok, Thailand	KO (Punch)	5	
2002-10-30	Win	(Thailand) Chutin Por.Tawachai	Jarumeang, Rajadamnern Stadium	Bangkok, Thailand	Decision	5	3:00
2002-09-23	Loss	(Thailand) Chutin Por.Tawachai	Daorungchuajroen, Rajadamnern Stadium	Bangkok, Thailand	Decision	5	3:00
2002-08-09	Loss	(Thailand) Sanghiran Lukbanyai	Kiatpetch, Lumpinee Stadium	Bangkok, Thailand	Decision	5	3:00
2002-07-07	Win	(Thailand) Saksit Sit.Or	Channel 7 Stadium	Bangkok, Thailand	KO (Punch)	3	
2002-06-27	Win	(Thailand) Denthoranee Nakhonthongparkview	Phetsupapan, Lumpinee Stadium	Bangkok, Thailand	Decision	5	3:00
2002-05-21	Win	(Thailand) Bovy Sor Udomson	Onesongchai	Bangkok, Thailand	TKO (Referee stoppage)	3	
2002-03-08	Draw	Thailand Pinsinchai	Kiatpetch, Lumpinee Stadium	Bangkok, Thailand	Decision	5	3:00
2002-	Win	(Thailand) Chalermphon Kiatsunanta	Lumpinee Stadium	Bangkok, Thailand	TKO	3	
2001-11-02	Win	(Thailand) Kongpipop Petchyindee	Petchyindee, Lumpinee Stadium	Bangkok, Thailand	KO (Punches)	3	
2001-06-29	Loss	(Thailand) Denthoranee Nakhorntongparkview	Saengmorakot, Lumpinee Stadium	Bangkok, Thailand	Decision	5	3:00
2001-06-07	Loss	(Thailand) Phetek Dejchusri	Onesongchai, Rajadamnern Stadium	Bangkok, Thailand	Decision	5	3:00
2001-	Win	(Thailand) Nungubon Sitlerchai		Bangkok, Thailand	Decision	5	3:00
2001-04-25	Win	(Thailand) Ngathao Attharungroj	Rajadamnern Stadium	Bangkok, Thailand	Decision	5	3:00
2000-12-15	Win	Thailand Pinsinchai	Kiatpetch, Lumpinee Stadium	Bangkok, Thailand			
2000-10-24	Win	(Thailand) Lertnimit Phetsuphapan	Lumpinee Stadium	Bangkok, Thailand	Decision	5	3:00
2000-07-14	Win	(Thailand) Naruenat Phetpayathai	Lumpinee Stadium	Bangkok, Thailand	Decision	5	3:00
2000-06-28	Loss	(Thailand) Kumanthong Por.Plumkamon	Rajadamnern Stadium	Bangkok, Thailand	Decision	5	3:00
2000-02-02	Win	(Thailand) Prakaipetch Kiatpailin	Rajadamnern Stadium	Bangkok, Thailand			
1999-12-14	Win	(Thailand) Sanchoenglek Jirakriengkrai	Rajadamnern Stadium	Bangkok, Thailand	Decision	5	3:00
1999-10-26	Loss	(Thailand) Sitrak Asawayothin	Lumpinee Stadium	Bangkok, Thailand	Decision	5	3:00
1999-10-04	Win	(Thailand) Yodbuangam Lukbanyai	Daorungchuajaroen, Rajadamnern Stadium	Bangkok, Thailand	KO (Right cross)	3	
1999-09-02	Win	(Thailand) Kayasit Chuwattana	Rajadamnern Stadium	Bangkok, Thailand	Decision	5	3:00
1999-07-29	Win	(Thailand) Boonlert Por.Thawatchai	Daorungchuajaroen, Rajadamnern Stadium	Bangkok, Thailand	Decision	5	3:00
1999-07-08	Win	(Thailand) Kantipong Luktapakart	Rajadamnern Stadium	Bangkok, Thailand	Decision	5	3:00
1999-06-10	Win	(Thailand) Kayasit Sakmuangklaeng	Rajadamnern Stadium	Bangkok, Thailand			
Wins the Rajadamnern Light Flyweight (108 lbs) title.
1999-05-06	Win	(Thailand) Prakyapetch Kiatpaillin	Jarumeang, Rajadamnern Stadium	Bangkok, Thailand	Decision	5	3:00
1999-	Draw	(Thailand) Morakot Chumpartour		Bangkok, Thailand	Decision	5	3:00
1999-	Win	(Thailand) Surachai Sitkruyam		Bangkok, Thailand	Decision	5	3:00
1999-01-27	Win	(Thailand) Raksotsot Sor.Kittichai		Bangkok, Thailand	Decision	5	3:00
1998-12-23	Loss	(Thailand) Phokaew Sitchafuang		Bangkok, Thailand	Decision	5	3:00
1998-11-18	Win	(Thailand) Klangsuan Sasiprapagym	Rajadamnern Stadium	Bangkok, Thailand	TKO	4	
Wins the Rajadamnern Mini Flyweight (105 lbs) title.
1998-10-31	Win	(Japan) Hinari Fukatsu	SNKA	Bunkyō, Tokyo, Japan	TKO	5	0:56
Legend: Win Loss Draw/No contest Notes

== See also ==
- List of male kickboxers
