= Ronnachai Naratreekul =

Thai Muay Thai fighter

- Born: Surasak Wankrahem; January 1, 1983 (age 43); Tha Sala district, Nakhon Si Thammarat province, Thailand
- Nickname: Black Mongoose (พังพอนดำ)
- Height: 163 cm (5 ft 4 in)
- Division: Light Flyweight; Flyweight; Super Flyweight; Bantamweight; Super Bantamweight; Featherweight
- Style: Muay Thai
- Stance: Southpaw
- Team: Naratreekul
- Trainer: Luksor Kiattipakpanang

Other information
- Occupation: Muay Thai trainer

Surasak Wankrahem (Thai: สุรศักดิ์ หวันกระเหรม; born January 1, 1983), known professionally as Ronnachai Naratreekul (Thai: รณชัย นราตรีกุล), is a Thai former professional Muay Thai fighter. He is a former Lumpinee Stadium Light Flyweight Champion.

== Biography and career ==
Ronnachai started to compete in Bangkok in 1995 for the Onesongchai promotion. He won the Lumpinee Stadium Light Flyweight title against on Chalamkhao Kiatpanthong June 12, 1998.

Thorughout his career Ronnachai defeated many notable champions such as Thongchai Tor.Silachai, Fahsuchon Sit-O, Anuwat Kaewsamrit, Bovy Sor Udomson and Jomthong Chuwattana.

After retiring, Ronnachai became a trainer. He currently works at the Dark Horse Boxing Gym. He was selected as the opponent for the retirement fight of Wanchalong PK.Saenchai which will happen on April 7, 2026.

== Titles and accomplishments ==
- Lumpinee Stadium
  - 1998 Lumpinee Stadium Light Flyweight (108 lbs) Champion

== Muay Thai record ==
Muay Thai record
Date	Result	Opponent	Event	Location	Method	Round	Time
2026-04-08	Win	(Thailand) Numtesaban Channonarai	Muaymansananmuang, Rangsit Stadium	Rangsit, Thailand	Decision	5	3:00
Wins 2 million bahts side-bet.
2007-05-08	Loss	(Thailand) Chalermdet Sor.Tawanrung	Khunsuk Trakunyang, Rajadamnern Stadium	Bangkok, Thailand	Decision	5	3:00
2007-03-29	Loss	(Thailand) Jomthong Chuwattana	Jarumueng, Rajadamnern Stadium	Bangkok, Thailand	Decision	5	3:00
2007-02-02	Loss	(Thailand) Anuwat Kaewsamrit	Khunsuk Trakunyang, Lumpinee Stadium	Bangkok, Thailand	Decision	5	3:00
2006-12-28	Win	(Thailand) Singtongnoi Por.Telakun	Phettongkham, Rajadamnern Stadium	Bangkok, Thailand	Decision	5	3:00
2006-10-31	Win	(Thailand) Phetto Sitjaopho	Khunsuk Trakunyang, Lumpinee Stadium	Bangkok, Thailand	KO (Punch)	4	
2006-09-04	Loss	(Thailand) Jomthong Chuwattana	Daorungchujaroen, Rajadamnern Stadium	Bangkok, Thailand	Decision	5	3:00
For the WMC World Featherweight (126 lbs) title.
2006-07-28	Win	(Thailand) Anuwat Kaewsamrit	Khunsuk Trakunyang, Lumpinee Stadium	Bangkok, Thailand	Decision	5	3:00
2006-05-04	Win	(Thailand) Phetek Kiatyongyut	Kiatyongyut, Rajadamnern Stadium	Bangkok, Thailand	Decision	5	3:00
2006-03-23	Win	(Thailand) Pettawee Sor Kittichai	Kiatyongyut, Rajadamnern Stadium	Bangkok, Thailand	Decision	5	3:00
2006-02-21	Loss	(Thailand) Longoen Pitakkrushidan	Phetsupaphan, Lumpinee Stadium	Bangkok, Thailand	Decision	5	3:00
2005-12-	Loss	(Thailand) Phetek Kiatyongyut	Omnoi Stadium	Samut Sakhon, Thailand	Decision	5	3:00
2005-11-02	Win	(Thailand) Jomthong Chuwattana	Daorungchujaroen, Rajadamnern Stadium	Bangkok, Thailand	Decision	5	3:00
2005-09-22	Loss	(Thailand) Anuwat Kaewsamrit	Onesongchai, Rajadamnern Stadium	Bangkok, Thailand	TKO (High kick)	3	
2005-08-12	Win	(Thailand) Bovy Sor Udomson	Queens Birthday	Bangkok, Thailand	Decision	5	3:00
2005-07-20	Win	(Thailand) Saenchernglek Jirakirengkrai	Daorungchujaroen, Rajadamnern Stadium	Bangkok, Thailand	Decision	5	3:00
2005-	Win	(Thailand) Saenchernglek Jirakirengkrai	Daorungchujaroen, Rajadamnern Stadium	Bangkok, Thailand	Decision	5	3:00
2005-05-20	NC	(Thailand) Kongprai Chor.Phaili	Lumpinee Stadium	Bangkok, Thailand	Ref.stop (Kongprai dismissded)	3	
2005-02-17	Win	(Thailand) Phetek Kiatyongyut	Onesongchai, Rajadamnern Stadium	Bangkok, Thailand	Decision	5	3:00
2005-01-20	Win	(Thailand) Dennaklang Sor.Weerapan	Rajadamnern Stadium	Bangkok, Thailand	Decision	5	3:00
2004-12-25	Loss	(Thailand) Saenchainoi Nongkeesuwit	Omnoi Stadium	Samut Sakhon, Thailand	Decision	5	3:00
2004-11-13	Win	(Thailand) Saenchainoi Nongkeesuwit	Onesongchai	Surin province, Thailand	Decision	5	3:00
2004-09-02	Loss	(Thailand) Wuttidet Lukprabat	Onesongchai, Rajadamnern Stadium	Bangkok, Thailand	Decision	5	3:00
2004-07-08	Loss	(Thailand) Phet-Ek Sitjaopho	Onesongchai, Rajadamnern Stadium	Bangkok, Thailand	Decision	5	3:00
2004-06-03	Loss	(Thailand) Sueahwallek Chor.Sopipong	Onesongchai, Rajadamnern Stadium	Bangkok, Thailand	Decision	5	3:00
2004-03-27	Win	(Thailand) Rittichai Somkidkarnka	Omnoi Stadium, Isuzu Cup, 3rd place fight	Samut Sakhon, Thailand	Decision	5	3:00
2004-01-	Win	(Thailand) Anuwat Kaewsamrit	Omnoi Stadium, Isuzu Cup, Semifinal	Samut Sakhon, Thailand	KO (Right cross)	2	
2003-12-27	Win	(Thailand) Rittichai Somkidkarnka	Omnoi Stadium, Isuzu Cup	Samut Sakhon, Thailand	Decision	5	3:00
2003-10-04	Win	(Thailand) Fahsuchon Sit-O	Omnoi Stadium, Isuzu Cup	Samut Sakhon, Thailand	TKO (Referee stopapge)	2	
2003-08-28	Loss	(Thailand) Saenchai Sor.Khamsing	OneSongchai, Lumpinee Stadium	Bangkok, Thailand	Decision	5	3:00
2003-07-27	Win	(Thailand) Sayannoi Kiattipraphat	OneSongchai + Por. Telakun, Rajadamnern Stadium	Bangkok, Thailand	Decision	5	3:00
2003-06-23		(Thailand) Bovy Sor Udomson	Onesongchai + Petchthongkam, Rajadamnern Stadium	Bangkok, Thailand			
2003-04-26	Draw	(Thailand) Bovy Sor Udomson	OneSongchai	Chachoengsao Province, Thailand	Decision	5	3:00
2003-03-28	Loss	(Thailand) Fahsuchon Sit-O	Lumpinee Stadium	Bangkok, Thailand	Decision	5	3:00
For a 500,000 baht side-bet.
2002-10-09	Loss	(Thailand) Wuttidet Lukprabat	Onesongchai + Palangnum, Rajadamnern Stadium	Bangkok, Thailand	Decision	5	3:00
2002-08-07	Win	(Thailand) Thongchai Tor.Silachai	Onesongchai, Rajadamnern Stadium	Bangkok, Thailand	Decision	5	3:00
2002-07-09	Win	(Thailand) Thongchai Tor.Silachai	Lumpinee Stadium	Bangkok, Thailand	Decision	5	3:00
2002-03-04	Loss	(Thailand) Klairung Sor.Chaicharoen	Onesongchai, Lumpinee Stadium	Bangkok, Thailand	Decision	5	3:00
2002-01-14	Loss	(Thailand) Klairung Sor.Chaicharoen	Wan Muay Thai + Onesongchai, Lumpinee Stadium	Bangkok, Thailand	Decision	5	3:00
1999-02-12	Win	(Thailand) Michael Sor.Sakulpan	Fairtex, Lumpinee Stadium	Bangkok, Thailand	Decision	5	3:00
1998-08-21	Loss	(Thailand) Chansak Singkhlongsi	Onesongchai, Lumpinee Stadium	Bangkok, Thailand	Decision	5	3:00
Loses the Lumpinee Stadium Light Flyweight (108 lbs) title.
1998-06-12	Win	(Thailand) Chalamkhao Kiatpanthong	Onesongchai, Lumpinee Stadium	Bangkok, Thailand	Decision	5	3:00
Wins the Lumpinee Stadium Light Flyweight (108 lbs) title.
1998-05-05	Win	(Thailand) Lertchai Kaitbodin	Onesongchai, Lumpinee Stadium	Bangkok, Thailand	Decision	5	3:00
1998-03-27	Win	(Thailand) Therdthailak Nakornthongparkview	Onesongchai, Lumpinee Stadium	Bangkok, Thailand	Decision	5	3:00
1998-01-16	Win	(Thailand) Saenkeng Sor.Weerakul		Thailand	Decision	5	3:00
1998-01-03	Draw	(Thailand) Chansak Singkhlongsi	Songchai Nai Khanom Tom, Lumpinee Stadium	Bangkok, Thailand	Decision	5	3:00
1997-11-18	Win	(Thailand) Kaewfannoi Sor.Ratchadaphon		Thailand	KO (Punches)	5	
1997-09-23	Loss	(Thailand) Sakol Meenayothin	Lumpinee Stadium	Bangkok, Thailand	Decision	5	3:00
1997-06-28	Win	(Thailand) Yodradap Daopaedriew	Onesongchai, Lumpinee Stadium	Bangkok, Thailand	Decision	5	3:00
1997-	Win	(Thailand) Dechaklon Sor.Sumalee	Onesongchai, Lumpinee Stadium	Bangkok, Thailand	Decision	5	3:00
1996-07-26	Win	(Thailand) Rungrit Sitjamlong	Onesongchai, Lumpinee Stadium	Bangkok, Thailand	Decision	5	3:00
1996-06-25	Win	(Thailand) Yodsanchai Sitthiyodthong	Lumpinee Stadium	Bangkok, Thailand	Decision	5	3:00
1996-05-29	Win	(Thailand) Yodradap Daopaedriew	Daorung Sor.Ploenchit, Adisorn Stadium	Saraburi, Thailand	Decision	5	3:00
Legend: Win Loss Draw/No contest Notes
