= Fahsuchon Sit-O =

Thai former professional Muay Thai fighter

- Born: Pradit Nuaket; April 14, 1983 (age 43); Huai Rat, Buriram, Thailand
- Native name: ประดิษฐ์ นวลแก้ว
- Nickname: Lightning Teep (จอมถีบสายฟ้า)
- Height: 164 cm (5 ft 5 in)
- Division: Flyweight; Super Flyweight; Bantamweight
- Style: Muay Thai (Muay Femur)
- Stance: Southpaw
- Team: Sit-O
- Years active: c. 1990–2014

Other information
- Occupation: Muay Thai trainer
- Notable relatives: PhetUtong Or.Kwanmuang (nephew)

Pradit Nuaket (Thai: ประดิษฐ์ นวลแก้ว; born April 14, 1983), known professionally as Fahsuchon Sit-O (Thai: ฟ้าสุชล ศิษย์โอ), is a Thai former professional Muay Thai fighter. He is a former Lumpinee Stadium Bantamweight Champion and three-division Thailand champion, as well as the 2000 Sports Writers Association of Thailand Fighter of the Year, who was famous during the 2000s and 2010s.

== Career ==
Fahsuchon was born on April 14, 1983, in the Buriram province where he started training and competing in Muay Thai at the age of 7 alongside his brothers. He competed all around Isan out of the Sit-O camp.

In Bangkok Fahsuchon was renowned for being a technician and having the best push kick (teep) on the circuit. He became the inaugural 112 lbs Thailand champion in 2000. The same year he was elected Fighter of the Year by the Sports Writers Association of Thailand. He also captured the 115 and 118 lbs Thailand titles as well as the Lumpinee Stadium bantamweight title in 2001.

Fahsuchon left the Bangkok circuit in the late 2000s and became a trainer at Tiger Muay hai in Phuket while still competing on smaller cards in the region. For his last fight Fahsuchon took part in the last ever gala at the old Lumpinee Stadium, he rematched Thailand Pinsinchai for a 1 million baht side-bet. He won the fight by decision. He participates in the training of his son Sayluad TigerMuayThai and his nephew PhetUtong Or.Kwanmuang who also was elected fighter of the year.

== Titles and accomplishments ==
- Lumpinee Stadium
  - 2001 Lumpinee Stadium Bantamweight (118 lbs) Champion
- Professional Boxing Association of Thailand (PAT)
  - 2000 Thailand Flyweight (112 lbs) Champion
  - 2001 Thailand Super Flyweight (115 lbs) Champion
  - 2001 Thailand Bantamweight (118 lbs) Champion

Awards

- 2000 Sports Writers Association of Thailand Fighter of the Year

== Fight record ==
Muay Thai Record
Date	Result	Opponent	Event	Location	Method	Round	Time
2014-02-07	Win	Thailand Pinsinchai	Lumpinee Stadium	Bangkok, Thailand	Decision	5	3:00
Wins 1 million baht side-bet.
2013-12-27	Loss	Thailand Pinsinchai	Lumpinee Stadium	Bangkok, Thailand	Decision	5	3:00
For a 200,000 baht side-bet.
2010-10-13	Win	(Thailand) Siamchai Phomtep	Bangla Stadium	Patong, Thailand	Decision	5	3:00
2010-09-17	Win	(Thailand)	Bangla Stadium	Patong, Thailand	TKO	5	
2010-09-03	Win		Bangla Stadium	Patong, Thailand	Decision	5	3:00
2010-07-30	Win	(Thailand) Kongdate Sor.Rakchard	Boxxtomoi	Langkawi, Malaysia	Decision	5	3:00
2010-04-10	Win	(Thailand) Rukk	Bangla Stadium	Patong, Thailand	Decision	5	3:00
2010-03-13	Win	(Thailand) Chengchai Promthep	Nai Harn Beach Stadium	Phuket, Thailand	Decision	5	3:00
2010-02-15	Win	(Thailand) Dennaklang	Patong Boxing Stadium	Patong, Thailand	Decision	5	3:00
2009-10-05	Win	(Thailand)	Patong Boxing Stadium	Patong, Thailand	TKO	4	
2006-04-08	Loss	(Thailand) Wattanasak Lukkantra	Onesongchai	Ubon Ratchathani province, Thailand	KO	2	
2005-10-19	Loss	(Thailand) Phet-ek Kiatyongyut	Rajadamnern Stadium	Bangkok, Thailand	Decision	5	3:00
2005-08-24	Loss	(Thailand) Sueahuallek Chor.Sophipong	Rajadamnern Stadium	Bangkok, Thailand	Decision	5	3:00
2005-06-18	Loss	(Thailand) Telek Nor.Siripung	Onesongchai, Sanam Luang	Bangkok, Thailand	Decision	5	3:00
2005-05-07	Loss	(Thailand) Klairung Sor Chaijaroen	Omnoi Stadium	Samut Sakhon, Thailand	Decision	5	3:00
2005-03-28	Win	(Thailand) Surasing Nongkeephahuyut	Rajadamnern Stadium	Bangkok, Thailand	Decision	5	3:00
2005-03-07	Win	(Thailand) Orono Tawan	Rajadamnern Stadium	Bangkok, Thailand	Decision	5	3:00
2004-05-05	Loss	(Thailand) Phet-Ek Sitjaopho	Rajadamnern Stadium	Bangkok, Thailand	Decision	5	3:00
2004-03-25	Loss	(Thailand) Wanmeechai Meenayothin	Rajadamnern Stadium	Bangkok, Thailand	Decision	5	3:00
2004-02-07	Loss	(Thailand) Porpitak Petchudomchai	Lumpinee Stadium	Bangkok, Thailand	Decision	5	3:00
2003-11-22	Loss	(Thailand) Ritthichai Somkidkarnka	Omnoi Stadium	Samut Sakhon, Thailand	Decision	5	3:00
2003-10-04	Loss	(Thailand) Ronnachai Naratreekul	Omnoi Stadium, Isuzu Cup	Samut Sakhon, Thailand	TKO (Referee stopapge)	2	
2003-08-14	Win	(Thailand) Watcharachai Kaewsamrit	Rajadamnern Stadium	Bangkok, Thailand	Decision	5	3:00
2003-07-17	Loss	(Thailand) Lerdsila Chumpairtour	Lumpinee Stadium	Bangkok, Thailand	Decision	5	3:00
2003-03-28	Win	(Thailand) Ronnachai Naratreekul	Lumpinee Stadium	Bangkok, Thailand	Decision	5	3:00
Wins 500,000 baht side-bet.
2003-02-11	Win	(Thailand) Ngathao Attharungroj	Lumpinee Stadium	Bangkok, Thailand	TKO	4	
2002-09-27	Win	(Thailand) Petchdam Singmanasak	Lumpinee Stadium	Bangkok, Thailand	Decision	5	3:00
2002-08-30	Win	(Thailand) Thanachai Sor.Surit	Lumpinee Stadium	Bangkok, Thailand	Decision	5	3:00
2002-05-28	Loss	(Thailand) Extra Sor.Rekchai	Lumpinee Stadium	Bangkok, Thailand	Decision	5	3:00
2002-04-26	Loss	Thailand Pinsinchai	Lumpinee Stadium	Bangkok, Thailand	Decision	5	3:00
Loses the Lumpinee Stadium and Thailand Bantamweight (118 lbs) titles.
2002-	Win	(Thailand) Kongpipop Petchyindee	Lumpinee Stadium	Bangkok, Thailand	TKO	3	
2001-12-07		(Thailand) Yodbuangam Lukbanyai	Lumpinee Stadium	Bangkok, Thailand			
2001-08-10	Loss	(Thailand) Sanghiran Lukbanyai	Lumpinee Stadium	Bangkok, Thailand	Decision	5	3:00
2001-07-17	Win	(Thailand) Nungubon Sitlerchai	Lumpinee Stadium	Bangkok, Thailand	Decision	5	3:00
Wins the vacant Lumpinee Stadium and Thailand Bantamweight (118 lbs) titles.
2001-05-25	Loss	(Thailand) Nungubon Sitlerchai	Lumpinee Stadium	Bangkok, Thailand	Decision	5	3:00
2001-04-10	Win	(Thailand) Yodradab Kiatpayathai	Lumpinee Stadium	Bangkok, Thailand	Decision	5	3:00
2001-02-27	Win	(Thailand) Paruhatnoi Sitjamee	Lumpinee Stadium	Bangkok, Thailand	Decision	5	3:00
Wins the Thailand Super Flyweight (115 lbs) title.
2001-02-03	Win	(Thailand) Pinsiam Sor.Amnuaysirichoke	Lumpinee Stadium	Bangkok, Thailand	Decision	5	3:00
2001-01-19	Win	(Thailand) Lomchoi Chor.Rama 6	Lumpinee Stadium	Bangkok, Thailand	Decision	5	3:00
Defends the Thailand Flyweight (112 lbs) title.
2000-12-08	Win	(Thailand) Petchtapee Por Singtai	Lumpinee Stadium	Bangkok, Thailand	Decision	5	3:00
Wins the inaugural Thailand Flyweight (112 lbs) title.
2000-10-27	Win	(Thailand) Lukphorkhun Por.Yosanan	Lumpinee Stadium	Bangkok, Thailand	Decision	5	3:00
2000-10-10	Loss	(Thailand) Pornsawan Porpramook	Lumpinee Stadium	Bangkok, Thailand	Decision	5	3:00
2000-	Win	(Thailand) Worawut Fairtex		Maha Sarakham province, Thailand	Decision	5	3:00
2000-09-19	Win	(Thailand) Samingdet Wor.Watcharin	Lumpinee Stadium	Bangkok, Thailand	Decision	5	3:00
2000-08-25	Win	(Thailand) Chalermpon Kiatsunanta	Lumpinee Stadium	Bangkok, Thailand	Decision	5	3:00
2000-08-08	Win	(Thailand) Wangyai Petchyindee	Lumpinee Stadium	Bangkok, Thailand	Decision	5	3:00
2000-05-09	Loss	(Thailand) Mafuanglek Chor.Na Phatthalung	Lumpinee Stadium	Bangkok, Thailand	Decision	5	3:00
2000-	Win	(Thailand) Mafuanglek Chor.Na Phatthalung	Aswindam Stadium	Bangkok, Thailand	Decision	5	3:00
2000-01-	Win	(Thailand) Chanasuk S.K.V.Gym	Rajadamnern Stadium	Bangkok, Thailand	Decision	5	3:00
Legend: Win Loss Draw/No contest Notes
