= Chachoengsao =

Chachoengsao ฉะเชิงเทรา
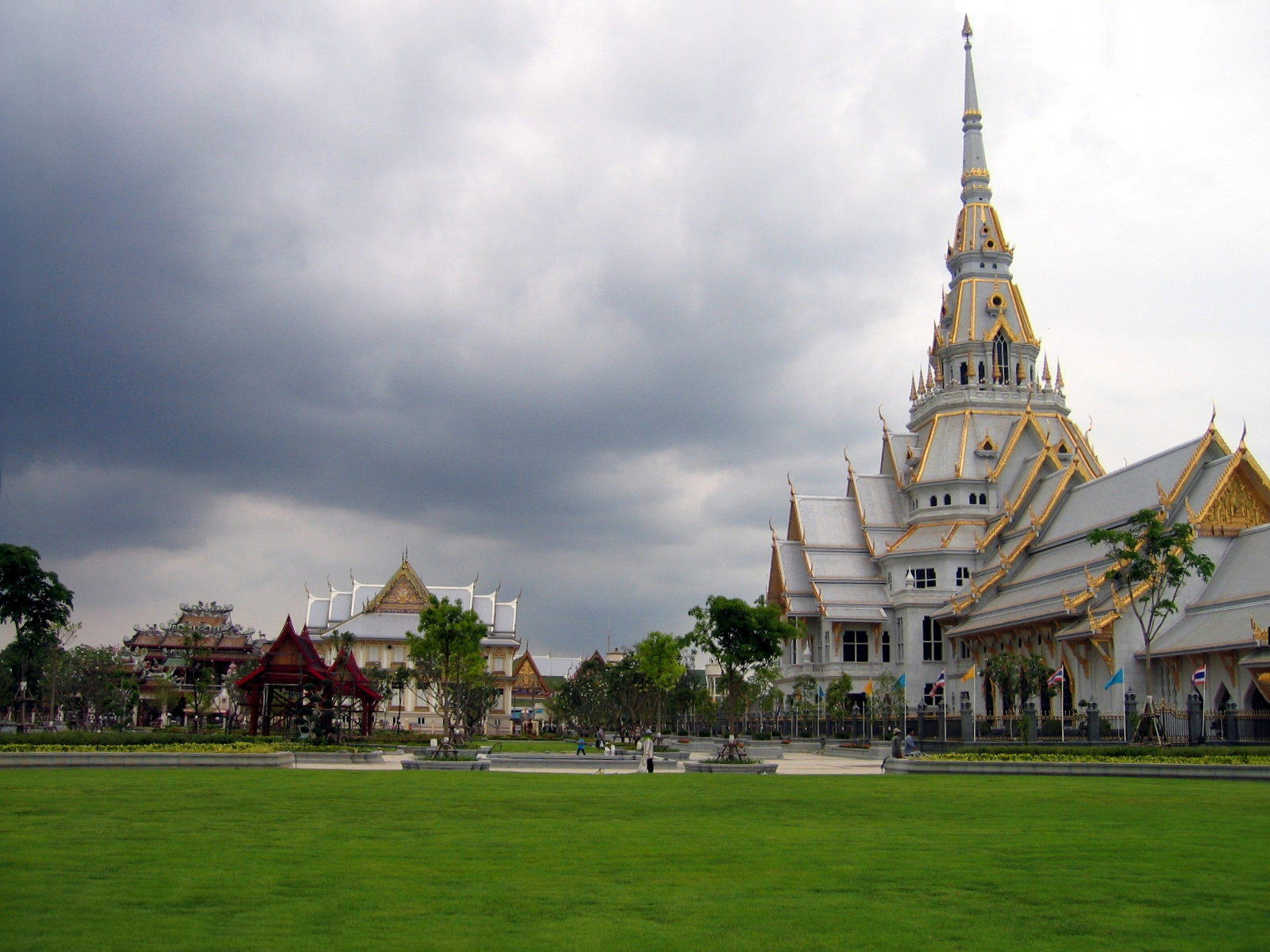
- Wat Sothonwararam Worawihan

- Location in Thailand
- Coordinates: 13°41′25″N 101°4′13″E
- Country: Thailand
- Province: Chachoengsao Province
- District: Mueang Chachoengsao

Government

Population (2006)
  - Total: 60,893
- Time zone: UTC+7 (ICT)

Chachoengsao (Thai: ฉะเชิงเทรา, pronounced [t͡ɕʰàʔ.t͡ɕʰɤ̄ːŋ.sāw]) is a town (thesaban mueang) in central Thailand, capital of Chachoengsao Province. It is on the banks of the Bang Pakong River. It includes tambon Na Mueang and parts of Ban Mai, Bang Tin Pet, Wang Takhian, and Sothon of Mueang Chachoengsao District. In 2006, it had a population of 60,893.

The town was established in 1549 during the reign of King Maha Chakkrapat of Ayutthaya and originally was a centre for military recruitment. During the reign of King Maha Thammaracha, the kingdom was in a weak condition due to being defeated by the Burmese. Phraya Lawaek, the Khmer king, conscripted Thais from several towns including Chachoengsao to be in his work force.

Chachoengsao is sometimes referred to as "Paet Riu", a name derived from large fish locally caught in the past. Paet Riu literally means "eight cuts" or slices which refers to the way the fish was cooked and served as a local dish in Chachoengsao.

The town is about 50 km east of Bangkok and can be accessed by train.

== Etymology ==
Chachoengsao (ฉะเชิงเทรา) is believed to be a corruption of Old Khmer cdiṅ, cdiṅṅ, chdiṅ, chdiṅṅ (“river"; "stream”), corresponding to Modern Khmer ស្ទឹង (stɨng) + Old Khmer jrau, jrov (“deep"), corresponding to Modern Khmer ជ្រៅ (crɨw); literally "deep river"; after the Bang Pakong River.

== History ==
Chachoengsao has a history dating back to the reign of King Borommatrailokkanat in the Ayutthaya Kingdom. Most people settled by the Bang Pakong River and along canals. "Luangpho Phuttha Sothon" is a centre of faith of the people of Paet Riu. In the past, Chachoengsao was a fourth class city under the ministry of defence. During the reign of King Rama I, it was attached to the ministry of the interior. Until the reign of King Rama V, who changed the administration system, Chachoengsao became a city. In 1916, its status was changed from a city to a province. "Chachoengsao" is a Khmer word which means 'deep canal'.

== Geography ==
The western part of the province is the low river plain of the Bang Pakong River, which is used extensively for farming rice. To the east is more hilly terrain, with an average elevation of more than 100 meter.

== Symbols ==
The provincial seal shows the main hall of the Sothornvararamvoraviharn Temple. In this hall is the most important Buddha image of the province, called Luang Por Buddha Sothorn.

The provincial tree is Peltophorum dasyrachis. The tree was assigned to the province by Queen Sirikit on the 50th anniversary of the coronation of King Rama IX in 2000. The provincial flower is the yellow flamboyant (Peltophorum pterocarpum).

The provincial slogan is The bountiful Bang Pakong River, the sacred Buddha image of Luangpho Sothon, Phraya Si Sunthon the scholar of Thai language, and the Pristine Ang Rue Nai Forest.

== Notable people ==
- Wichan Sakiya, footballer and Kor Royal Cup winner
