= Chatchainoi Sitbenjama =

Thai Muay Thai fighter

Chatchainoi
- Born: Chaiwat Chaemcharoen; May 29, 1982 (age 44); Ban Pho district, Chachoengsao province, Thailand
- Other names: Chatchainoi GardenSeaview (ฉัตรชัยน้อย การ์เด้นซีวิว); Chatchainoi Sor.Jor.ToiPaetRiew (ฉัตรชัยน้อย ส.จ.ต้อยแปดริ้ว); Burapa Mai Pae (บูรพาไม่แพ้)
- Height: 163 cm (5 ft 4 in)
- Weight: 55 kg (121 lb; 8.7 st)
- Style: Muay Thai
- Fighting out of: Chachoengsao province, Thailand
- Team: Sit Benjama
- Trainer: Odnoi Sitjompop

Chaiwat Chaemcharoen (Thai: ฉชัยวัฒน์ แจ่มจำรัส) known professionally as Chatchainoi Sitbenjama (Thai: ฉัตรชัยน้อย ศิษย์เบญจมะ) is a Thai Muay Thai fighter.

== Career ==
On May 7, 2009, Chatchainoi faced Khaimookdam Sit-O at the Rajadamnern Stadium for the Onesongchai promotion. He lost the fight by fourth-round technical knockout after hurting his arm.

In 2010 Chatchainoi entered the first Footkien Group Tournament. He reached the final happening on May 1, 2010, against Lertpetch Por.Worasing. He lost the fight by decision.

On June 18, 2011, Chatchainoi faced Singsuriya AlloySrinakorn at a Onesongchai promoted event. He lost the fight by fourth-round knockout.

On June 3, 2013, Chatchainoi faced Sangmanee Sor Tienpo at the Rajadamnern Stadium. He lost the fight by decision.

On September 20, 2014, Chatchainoi faced Karim Bennoui in France at La Nuit Des Challenges 13. He lost the fight by unanimous decision.

On 2015 Chatchainoi travelled to Luxemburg to face Hamza Merdi at Kings of Muay Thai 7 for the 58 kg title. He won the fight by majority decision.

Chatchainoi defended his Kings of Muay Thai -58 kg title on October 24, 2015, against Thibault Duphil. He lost the fight by unanimous decision.

== Titles and accomplishments ==
- Rajadamnern Stadium
  - 2003 Rajadamnern Stadium Flyweight (112 lbs) Champion
  - 2003 Rajadamnern Stadium Super Flyweight (115 lbs) Champion
  - 2007 Rajadamnern Stadium Fighter of the Year
- Onesongchai
  - 2007 S-1 World Bantamweight (118 lbs) Champion
- World Muaythai Council
  - 2003 WMC World Super Flyweight (115 lbs) Champion
    - One successful title defense
- Omnoi Stadium
  - 2010 Footkien Group Tournament Runner-up

== Fight record ==
Muay Thai record
Date	Result	Opponent	Event	Location	Method	Round	Time
2024-01-20	Win	(Italy) Carmelo Marchese	LWC Super Champ, Lumpinee Stadium	Bangkok, Thailand	Decision	3	3:00
2023-06-24	Win	(Iran) Shahin Kanlori	LWC Super Champ, Lumpinee Stadium	Bangkok, Thailand	TKO (leg injury)	2	
2015-10-24	Loss	(France) Thibault Duphil	Kings of Muay Thai 8	Luxembourg City, Luxemburg	Decision (Unanimous)	5	3:00
Loses the Kings of Muay Thai -58kg title.
2015-03-28	Win	(France) Hamza Merdi	Kings of Muay Thai 7	Luxembourg City, Luxemburg	Decision (Majority)	5	3:00
Wins the vacant the Kings of Muay Thai -58kg title.
2015-01-08	Loss	(Thailand) Chorfah Tor.Sangtiennoi	Onesongchai, Rajadamnern Stadium	Bangkok, Thailand	Decision	5	3:00
2014-10-25	Loss	(Thailand) Songpetch NamsaengKorsang	Omnoi Stadium	Samut Sakhon, Thailand	Decision	5	3:00
2014-09-20	Loss	(France) Karim Bennoui	La Nuit Des Challenges 13	Saint-Fons, France	Decision (Unanimous)	5	3:00
2014-07-18	Win	(Thailand) Rungrat Naratreekun	Khunsuk Trakunyang, Rajadamnern Stadium	Bangkok, Thailand	Decision	5	3:00
2014-04-26	Loss	(Thailand) Petchbandan Chaisukhothai	Omnoi Stadium	Samut Sakhon, Thailand	Decision	5	3:00
2014-02-10	Win	(Thailand) Kwanphet Sor.Suwannaphakdee	Bangrachan, Rajadamnern Stadium	Bangkok, Thailand	Decision	5	3:00
2013-10-24	Loss	(Thailand) Chorfah Tor.Sangtiennoi	Onesongchai, Rajadamnern Stadium	Bangkok, Thailand	Decision	5	3:00
2013-09-04	Win	(Thailand) Kangwanlek Petchyindee	Petchwiset + Wanmeechai, Rajadamnern Stadium	Bangkok, Thailand	Decision	5	3:00
2013-07-09	Loss	(Thailand) Lamnamoon Sakchaichot	Kiatpetch, Lumpinee Stadium	Bangkok, Thailand	Decision	5	3:00
2013-06-03	Loss	(Thailand) Sangmanee Sor Tienpo	Onesongchai, Rajadamnern Stadium	Bangkok, Thailand	Decision	5	3:00
2013-04-27	Win	(Thailand) Sueabin Kiatcharoenchai	Omnoi Stadium	Samut Sakhon, Thailand	Decision	5	3:00
2012-12-08	Loss	(Thailand) Panomroonglek Kiatmoo9	Omnoi Stadium	Samut Sakhon, Thailand	Decision	5	3:00
2012-10-20	Win	(Thailand) Kaewkla Kaewsamrit	Omnoi Stadium	Samut Sakhon, Thailand	Decision	5	3:00
2011-09-20	Loss	(Thailand) Yodwicha Por.Boonsit	Petchsuphan, Lumpinee Stadium	Bangkok, Thailand	KO (Elbow)	3	
2011-06-18	Loss	(Thailand) Singsuriya AlloySrinakorn	Onesongchai	Thailand	TKO (Elbow)	3	
2011-03-15	Loss	(Thailand) Nongbeer Choknamwong	Phetsupapan, Lumpinee Stadium	Bangkok, Thailand	Decision	5	3:00
2010-08-25	Loss	(Thailand) Rungphet Wor Rungniran	Onesongchai, Rajadamnern Stadium	Bangkok, Thailand	KO	4	
2010-07-29	Loss	(Thailand) Phudpadnoi Muangsima	Petchaophraya, Rajadamnern Stadium	Bangkok, Thailand	Decision	5	3:00
2010-06-11	Win	(Thailand) Phudpadnoi Muangsima	Por.Pramuk, Lumpinee Stadium	Bangkok, Thailand	Decision	5	3:00
2010-05-01	Loss	(Thailand) Lertpetch Por.Worasing	Omnoi Stadium - Footkien Group Tournament, Final	Samut Sakhon, Thailand	Decision	5	3:00
2010-03-20	Win	(Thailand) Denchiangkwan LaemthongKanphaet	Omnoi Stadium	Samut Sakhon, Thailand	Decision	5	3:00
2010-01-09	Loss	(Thailand) Mekpayak Lukhuanghin	Omnoi Stadium	Samut Sakhon, Thailand	KO (Elbow)	2	
2009-11-29	Win	(Thailand) Prab Kaiyang5daoGym	Omnoi Stadium	Samut Sakhon, Thailand	Decision	5	3:00
2009-05-07	Loss	(Thailand) Khaimookdam Sit-O	Onesongchai, Rajadamnern Stadium	Bangkok, Thailand	TKO (arm injury)	4	
2009-03-12	Win	(Thailand) Khaimookdam Sit-O	Onesongchai, Rajadamnern Stadium	Bangkok, Thailand	Decision	5	3:00
2009-02-11	Loss	(Thailand) Khaimookdam Sit-O	Phettongkam, Rajadamnern Stadium	Bangkok, Thailand	Decision	5	3:00
2009-01-14	Loss	(Thailand) Luknimit Singklongsi	Onesongchai, Rajadamnern Stadium	Bangkok, Thailand	Decision	5	3:00
2008-12-18	Loss	(Thailand) Thong Lukmakhamwan	Onesongchai, Rajadamnern Stadium	Bangkok, Thailand	Decision	5	3:00
2008-11-06	Win	(Thailand) Pakorn Sakyothin	Onesongchai, Rajadamnern Stadium	Bangkok, Thailand	Decision	5	3:00
2008-10-09	Win	(Thailand) Pakorn Sakyothin	Onesongchai, Rajadamnern Stadium	Bangkok, Thailand	Decision	5	3:00
2008-09-18	Win	(Thailand) Pakorn Sakyothin	Onesongchai, Rajadamnern Stadium	Bangkok, Thailand	Decision	5	3:00
2008-08-07	Win	(Thailand) Luknimit Singklongsi	Onesongchai, Rajadamnern Stadium	Bangkok, Thailand	Decision	5	3:00
2008-04-10	Loss	(Thailand) Dejsuriya Sitthiprasit	Onesongchai, Rajadamnern Stadium	Bangkok, Thailand	TKO (arm injury)	2	
2008-02-07	Loss	(Thailand) Pettawee Sor Kittichai	Onesongchai, Rajadamnern Stadium	Bangkok, Thailand	Decision	5	3:00
2007-11-24	Win	(Thailand) Rittjak Kaewsamrit	80th Anniversary of the King	Nonthaburi province, Thailand	Decision	5	3:00
Wins the S-1 World Bantamweight (118 lbs) title.
2007-	Win	(Thailand) Phaendin Sor.Darmrongrit	Rajadamnern Stadium	Bangkok, Thailand	Decision	5	3:00
2007-08-	Loss	(Thailand) Dejsuriya Sitthiprasit	Rajadamnern Stadium	Bangkok, Thailand	Decision	5	3:00
2007-07-16	Loss	(Thailand) Rittjak Kaewsamrit	Rajadamnern Stadium	Bangkok, Thailand	Decision	5	3:00
For the S-1 World Bantamweight (118 lbs) title.
2007-06-25	Win	(Thailand) Pornmongkol Sakhiranchai	Onesongchai, Rajadamnern Stadium	Bangkok, Thailand	Decision	5	3:00
2007-05-07	Win	(Thailand) Phaendin Sor.Darmrongrit	Onesongchai, Rajadamnern Stadium	Bangkok, Thailand	Decision	5	3:00
2007-04-12	Win	(Thailand) Phornmongkol Sakhiranchai	Onesongchai, Rajadamnern Stadium	Bangkok, Thailand	Decision	5	3:00
2007-03-08	Loss	(Thailand) Pornsanae Sitmonchai	Onesongchai, Rajadamnern Stadium	Bangkok, Thailand	KO (Right hook)	4	
For the vacant WMC World Bantamweight (118 lbs) title.
2007-01-27	Win	(Thailand) Thongchai Tor.Silachai	Rajadamnern Stadium	Bangkok, Thailand	Decision	5	3:00
2006-12-23	Win	(Thailand) Phayasuea Sor.Hengcharoen	Rajadamnern Stadium	Bangkok, Thailand	Decision	5	3:00
2006-09-25	Loss	(Thailand) Pornmongkol Sakhiranchai	Onesongchai, Rajadamnern Stadium	Bangkok, Thailand	Decision	5	3:00
2006-08-14	Win	(Thailand) Thongchai Tor.Silachai	Onesongchai, Rajadamnern Stadium	Bangkok, Thailand	Decision	5	3:00
2006-07-05	Win	(Thailand) Rungrat Naratreekul	Onesongchai, Rajadamnern Stadium	Bangkok, Thailand	Decision	5	3:00
2006-05-29	Win	(Thailand) Kwanpichit 13RianExpress	Onesongchai, Rajadamnern Stadium	Bangkok, Thailand	Decision	5	3:00
2006-03-17	Loss	(Thailand) Detnarong Sitjaboon	Petchsupaphan, Lumpinee Stadium	Bangkok, Thailand	Decision	5	3:00
2006-02-16	Win	(Thailand) Phaenfa Sor.Darmrongrit	Onesongchai, Rajadamnern Stadium	Bangkok, Thailand	Decision	5	3:00
2006-01-13	Win	(Thailand) Detnarong Sitjaboon	Petchsupaphan, Lumpinee Stadium	Bangkok, Thailand	Decision	5	3:00
2005-12-12	Loss	(Thailand) Phaendin Sor.Darmrongrit	Chaomuangchon, Rajadamnern Stadium	Bangkok, Thailand	Decision	5	3:00
2005-09-03	Loss	(Thailand) Rakkiat Kiatpraphat	Omnoi Stadium - Isuzu Cup Group Stage	Samut Sakhon, Thailand	Decision	5	3:00
2005-08-08	Loss	(Thailand) Daoden Singklongsi	Onesongchai, Rajadamnern Stadium	Bangkok, Thailand	Decision	5	3:00
2005-07-06	Loss	(Thailand) Pornsanae Sitmonchai	Onesongchai, Rajadamnern Stadium	Bangkok, Thailand	Decision	5	3:00
2005-06-09	Draw	(Thailand) Phayasuea Sor.Hengcharoen	Onesongchai, Rajadamnern Stadium	Bangkok, Thailand	Decision	5	3:00
2005-04-09	Win	(Thailand) Phayasuea Sor.Hengcharoen	Onesongchai, Omnoi Stadium	Samut Sakhon, Thailand	Decision	5	3:00
2005-03-07	Loss	(Thailand) Tubnar Sitromsai	Onesongchai, Rajadamnern Stadium	Bangkok, Thailand	TKO	2	
2005-01-20	Loss	(Thailand) Taweesak Singklongsi	Onesongchai, Rajadamnern Stadium	Bangkok, Thailand	Decision	5	3:00
2004-11-18	Win	(Thailand) Wanna Kaennorasing	Onesongchai, Rajadamnern Stadium	Bangkok, Thailand	Decision	5	3:00
2004-09-16	Loss	(Thailand) Tubnar Sitromsai	Onesongchai, Rajadamnern Stadium	Bangkok, Thailand	KO (Left hook)	3	
Loses the WMC World Super Flyweight (115 lbs) title.
2004-08-05	Win	(Thailand) Kwanpichit 13RianExpress	Onesongchai, Rajadamnern Stadium	Bangkok, Thailand	Decision	5	3:00
2004-07-13	Win	(Thailand) Rungruanglek Lukprabat	Petchsuphapan, Lumpinee Stadium	Bangkok, Thailand	Decision	5	3:00
2004-06-03	Loss	(Thailand) Pornsanae Sitmonchai	Onesongchai, Rajadamnern Stadium	Bangkok, Thailand	KO	3	
2004-05-05	Win	(Thailand) Orono Muangsima	Chaoballanglok, Rajadamnern Stadium	Bangkok, Thailand	Decision	5	3:00
2004-04-08	Loss	(Thailand) Orono Muangsima	Onesongchai, Rajadamnern Stadium	Bangkok, Thailand	Decision	5	3:00
2004-01-27	Loss	(Thailand) Sam-A Gaiyanghadao	Petchpiya, Lumpinee Stadium	Bangkok, Thailand	TKO	5	
2003-12-25	Win	(Thailand) Phongsing Kiatchansing	Onesongchai, Rajadamnern Stadium	Bangkok, Thailand	Decision	5	3:00
Wins the Rajadamnern Stadium Super Flyweight (115 lbs) title and defends the WMC World Super Flyweight (115 lbs) title.
2003-11-27	Win	(Thailand) Thongchai Tor.Silachai	Onesongchai, Rajadamnern Stadium	Bangkok, Thailand	Decision	5	3:00
Wins the WMC World Super Flyweight (115 lbs) title.
2003-10-26	Win	(Thailand) Kwanphichit Hor.Pattanachai	Onesongchai, Rajadamnern Stadium	Bangkok, Thailand	Decision	5	3:00
Wins the vacant Rajadamnern Stadium Flyweight (112 lbs) title.
2003-08-28	Win	(Thailand) Rungruanglek Lukprabat	Onesongchai, Lumpinee Stadium	Bangkok, Thailand	Decision	5	3:00
2003-07-27	Win	(Thailand) Rungruanglek Lukprabat	Onesongchai, Lumpinee Stadium	Bangkok, Thailand	Decision	5	3:00
2003-05-19	Loss	(Thailand) Orono Sor.Sakulpan	Onesongchai, Rajadamnern Stadium	Bangkok, Thailand	Decision	5	3:00
2003-02-03	Win	(Thailand) Krapetch Petchrachapat	Petchthongkam, Rajadamnern Stadium	Bangkok, Thailand	Decision	5	3:00
2002-12-18	Loss	(Thailand) Phongsing Kiatchansing	Petchthongkam, Rajadamnern Stadium	Bangkok, Thailand	Decision	5	3:00
2002-	Win	(Thailand) Densiam Wanmanee	Rajadamnern Stadium	Bangkok, Thailand	Decision	5	3:00
2002-07-18	Win	(Thailand) Sueathai Kiatchansing	Onesongchai, Rajadamnern Stadium	Bangkok, Thailand	Decision	5	3:00
2002-06-19	Loss	(Thailand) Mangkornpetch Kiatpnc	Sor.Wanchat, Rajadamnern Stadium	Bangkok, Thailand	Decision	5	3:00
2002-	Loss	(Thailand) Phongsing Kiatchansing	Rajadamnern Stadium	Bangkok, Thailand	KO	3	
2002-	Win	(Thailand) Wangprai Meenayothin	Rajadamnern Stadium	Bangkok, Thailand	Decision	5	3:00
2002-03-18	Win	(Thailand) Mangkornpetch Kiatpnc	Bangrachan, Rajadamnern Stadium	Bangkok, Thailand	Decision	5	3:00
2002-02-27	Win	(Thailand) Yodsaenchai Sor.Sakulphan	Rajadamnern Stadium	Bangkok, Thailand	Decision	5	3:00
2002-	Win	(Thailand) Phongsing Kiatchansing	Rajadamnern Stadium	Bangkok, Thailand	Decision	5	3:00
?-09-28	Win	(Thailand) Sitrak Atsawayotin	Onesongchai, Rajadamnern Stadium	Bangkok, Thailand	Decision	5	3:00
?-	Win	(Thailand) Praduthong Naratreekul	Lumpinee Stadium	Bangkok, Thailand	Decision	5	3:00
2001-08-28	Win	(Thailand) Sueathai Kiatchansing	Onesongchai, Rajadamnern Stadium	Bangkok, Thailand	Decision	5	3:00
2001-04-26	Loss	(Thailand) Thewarat Kiatchansing	Kiatsingnoi, Rajadamnern Stadium	Bangkok, Thailand	Decision	5	3:00
2000-11-25	Loss	(Thailand) Puja Sor.Suwanee	Lumpinee Stadium	Bangkok, Thailand	Decision	5	3:00
For the Lumpinee Stadium Light Flyweight (108 lbs) title.
2000-10-29	Win	(Thailand) Sueathai Kiatchansing	Samrong Stadium	Samrong, Thailand	Decision	5	3:00
2000-09-10	Win	(Thailand) Puja Sor.Suwanee	Yod Muay Thai, Samrong Stadium	Samrong, Thailand	Decision	5	3:00
2000-08-13	Loss	(Thailand) Deaw Hiranrat	Samrong Stadium	Samrong, Thailand	Decision	5	3:00
2000-04-03	Loss	(Thailand) Lertchai Kiatbodin		Chachoengsao province, Thailand	TKO	3	
2000-03-05	Win	(Thailand) Kwangngern B.K.S		Thailand	Decision	5	3:00
?-09-07	Loss	(Thailand) Namphonlek Nongkeepahuyuth		Chachoengsao province, Thailand	Decision	5	3:00
1999-08-01	Loss	(Thailand) Taweesak Singklongsi	Muay Thai World Heritage	Chachoengsao province, Thailand	Decision	5	3:00
1999-06-26	Win	(Thailand) Dejdamrong Sor Amnuaysirichoke	Lumpinee Stadium	Bangkok, Thailand	Decision	5	3:00
Legend: Win Loss Draw/No contest Notes
