= Luknimit Singklongsi =

Thai Muay fighter

- Born: Chuchart Popiam; April 19, 1986 (age 40); Lopburi, Thailand
- Other names: Luknimit Lukprabat
- Height: 170 cm (5 ft 7 in)
- Weight: 132 lb (60 kg; 9 st 6 lb)
- Division: Light welterweight
- Style: Muay Khao
- Fighting out of: Singklongsi Gym, Lopburi Province
- Years active: 1992-present

Other information
- Notable relatives: Charnsak Singklongsi; Taweesak Singklongsi; Taweeporn Singklongsi; Kotchasarn Singklongsi

Luknimit Singklongsi (Thai: ลูกนิมิต สิงห์คลองสี่) is a Thai Muay Thai fighter.

== Biography and career ==
Luknimit started Muay Thai at only 6 years old, inspired by his oldest brother who was already well-known at the time.

Born into the Popiam family, he has four brothers, all of whom were accomplished boxers. His oldest brother, Charnsak Singklongsi was a Lumpinee Stadium Champion at 108 lbs and beat Saenchai multiple times. Another brother, Taweesak Singklongsi was a Lumpinee Stadium Champion and S1 World Champion at 108 lbs. Taweesak's twin, Taweeporn was a boxing Champion of Hong Kong. Luknimit's youngest brother, Kotchasarn Singklongsi had a notable knockout win over Namsaknoi Yudthagarngamtorn and twice fought for the Lumpinee Stadium title against Attachai Fairtex and Singsarawat 13Coins. Kotchasarn died at 23 years old in a motorcycle accident.

Luknimit started his career at the Lukprabat camp in Saraburi Province, but soon moved to the Singklongsi Gym with his brothers in his home province of Lopburi where he has stayed for over 20 years.

Luknimit has been ranked n°1 at both Rajadamnern Stadium and Lumpinee Stadium multiple times in his long career.

At his best, he has beaten Wanheng Menayothin, Norasing Lukbanyai, Thongchai Tor.Silachai, Kaimukkao Por.Thairongruangkamai, Kaonar P.K.Saenchaimuaythaigym, Thanonchai Thanakorngym, Superbank Mor.Ratanabandit, Thaksinlek Kiatniwat, Chorfah Tor.Sangtiennoi, Prajanchai P.K.Saenchaimuaythaigym, and Suakim P.K.Saenchaimuaythaigym.

== Titles and accomplishments ==
- Rajadamnern Stadium
  - 2006 Rajadamnern Stadium 108 lbs Champion
- World Muaythai Council
  - 2007 WMC 108 lbs World Champion
- Onesongchai promotion
  - 2022 S-1 Junior Lightweight Champion
  - 2024 S-1 Super Lightweight Champion
- Jitmuangnon promotion
  - 2025 Jitmuangnon Super Featherweight Champion

== Fight record ==
Muay Thai Record (incomplete)
Date	Result	Opponent	Event	Location	Method	Round	Time
2026-10-16	Loss	(Thailand) Lerdsila Jitmuangnon	Jitmuangnon, Or.Tor.Gor.3 Stadium	Nonthaburi province, Thailand	Decision	5	3:00
Loses the Jitmuangnon Super Featherweight title
2026-09-04	Loss	(Thailand) Petchsongkom Sitcharoensap	Petchyindee, Rajadamnern Stadium	Bangkok, Thailand	Decision	5	3:00
2026-07-25	Win	(Thailand) Promrob AjarnWatMuayThai	Palangpaendin + Jitmuangnon	Nonthaburi province, Thailand	Decision	5	3:00
Defends the Jitmuangnon Super Featherweight title
2026-06-26	Loss	(Thailand) Petchsongkom Sitcharoensap	Jitmuangnon, Jitmuangnon Stadium	Nonthaburi province, Thailand	Decision	5	3:00
2026-04-15	Loss	(Thailand) Silangern LannaWaterSide	Palangmai, Rajadamnern Stadium	Bangkok, Thailand	Decision	5	3:00
2026-02-27	Win	(Thailand) Wuttidet Tded99	Jitmuangnon, Or.Tor.Gor.3 Stadium	Nonthaburi province, Thailand	Decision	5	3:00
2026-02-05	Win	(Thailand) Petchsongkhom Sitjaroensap	Petchyindee, Rajadamnern Stadium	Bangkok, Thailand	Decision	5	3:00
2025-11-08	Win	(Thailand) BankThai Sitsangprab	Jitmuangnon, Or.Tor.Gor.3 Stadium	Nonthaburi province, Thailand	Decision	5	3:00
2025-10-11	Win	(Thailand) Yodwittaya SorTor.HiewBangSaen	Sinlapa Muay Thai Lopburi + Jitmuangnon	Lopburi province, Thailand	Decision	5	3:00
Wins the vacant Jitmuangnon Super Featherweight title
2025-09-28	Loss	(Japan) Takuma Ota	NJKF x Challenger	Tokyo, Japan	Decision (Unanimous)	3	3:00
2025-08-09	Win	(Thailand) Petchniran Dabransarakham	Maha Sarakham University	Maha Sarakham province, Thailand	Decision	5	3:00
2025-07-12	Loss	(Thailand) PetchHuaHin Jitmuangnon	Jitmuangnon, Omnoi Stadium	Samut Sakhon, Thailand	Decision	5	3:00
2025-06-15	Win	(Thailand) Jaroenphon KiwkiwTeRitthisakMuayThai	Muaydee VitheeThai, Thupatemi stadium	Pathum Thani, Thailand	Decision	5	3:00
2025-03-22	Loss	(Cambodia) Sok Thy		Cambodia	Decision	5	3:00
2025-03-09	Loss	(Thailand) Petchpayathai Saengmorakot	Muaydee VitheeThai, Thupatemi stadium	Pathum Thani, Thailand	Decision	5	3:00
2025-02-02	Win	(Thailand) Apiwat Sor.Somnuk	Muaydee VitheeThai, Thupatemi stadium	Pathum Thani, Thailand	Decision	5	3:00
2024-12-28	Win	(Italy) Luca 7Muaythai	Jitmuangnon, Omnoi stadium	Samut Sakhon, Thailand	Decision	5	3:00
2024-12-01	Win	(Thailand) Wuttidet Tded99	Muaydee VitheeThai, Thupatemi stadium	Pathum Thani, Thailand	Decision	5	3:00
2024-10-20	Win	(Thailand) Khunpon Ekmuangnon	Muaydee VitheeThai, Thupatemi stadium	Pathum Thani, Thailand	Decision	5	3:00
2024-08-11	Loss	(Thailand) Sanit Lukthamsua	Muaydee VitheeThai	Thailand	KO (Flying knee)	2	
2024-06-30	Win	(Thailand) Charoenporn Petchphothong	Onesongchai, Phraya Sua stadium	Kanchanaburi province, Thailand	Decision	5	3:00
Wins Onesongchai S-1 Super Lightweight title
2024-06-09	Win	(Thailand) Salatan Jitmuangnon	Muaydee VitheeThai, Or.Tor.Gor3 Stadium	Nonthaburi province, Thailand	Decision	5	3:00
2024-04-28	Win	(Thailand) Samingdam LooksuanAutoR1	Muaydee VitheeThai, Or.Tor.Gor3 Stadium	Nonthaburi province, Thailand	Decision	5	3:00
2024-03-30	Loss	(Thailand) Kengkla Jitmuangnon	Muaydee VitheeThai, Or.Tor.Gor3 Stadium	Nonthaburi province, Thailand	Decision	5	3:00
2024-02-25	Loss	(Thailand) NongBew Jitmuangnon	Muaydee VitheeThai, Or.Tor.Gor3 Stadium	Nonthaburi province, Thailand	Decision	5	3:00
2024-01-21	Loss	(Thailand) Panmongkol PakyokTH	Muaydee VitheeThai, Or.Tor.Gor3 Stadium	Nonthaburi province, Thailand	Decision	5	3:00
2023-12-31	Win	(Thailand) Wuttidet Tded99	Muaydee VitheeThai + Jitmuangnon, Or.Tor.Gor3 Stadium	Nonthaburi province, Thailand	Decision	5	3:00
2023-11-25	Win	(Thailand) Sanit Luktamsua	9MuaydeeVitheeThai + Jitmuangnon, Or.Tor.Gor3 Stadium	Nonthaburi province, Thailand	Decision	5	3:00
2023-10-30	Draw	(Thailand) Denpayak Detchpetchsithong	Muay Thai Pantamit + Sor.Salacheep	Lopburi province, Thailand	Decision	5	3:00
2023-09-29	Loss	(Thailand) Petchphayathai Sangmorakot	9MuaydeeVitheeThai + Jitmuangnon, Or.Tor.Gor3 Stadium	Nonthaburi province, Thailand	Decision	5	3:00
2023-07-22	Win	(Thailand) Superball Sityodtong	9MuaydeeVitheeThai, Or.Tor.Gor3 Stadium	Nonthaburi province, Thailand	Decision	5	3:00
2023-07-01	Win	(Thailand) Supachailek Nengsapyai	9MuaydeeVitheeThai, Or.Tor.Gor3 Stadium	Nonthaburi province, Thailand	Decision	5	3:00
2023-06-21	Loss	(Thailand) Nueapetch Tded99	Muaydee VitheeThai + Jitmuangnon, Or.Tor.Gor3 Stadium	Nonthaburi province, Thailand	Decision	5	3:00
2023-04-30	Win	(Thailand) Chanyut Sakrungruang	Muaydee VitheeThai + Jitmuangnon, Or.Tor.Gor3 Stadium	Nonthaburi province, Thailand	TKO	4	
2023-03-29	Loss	(Thailand) Magnum Sor.Sommai	Muay Thai Palangmai, Rajadamnern Stadium	Bangkok, Thailand	Decision	5	3:00
2023-03-05	Win	(Thailand) Promrob PakyokTH	Muaydee VitheeThai + Jitmuangnon, Or.Tor.Gor3 Stadium	Nonthaburi province, Thailand	Decision	5	3:00
2023-01-19	Win	(Thailand) Petchwanchai Wor.Sangprapai	Petchyindee, Rajadamnern Stadium	Bangkok, Thailand	Decision	5	3:00
2022-12-13	Loss	(Thailand) Promrob Nor.Nophiran	Chang Muay Thai Onesongchaisanjorn	Saraburi province, Thailand	Decision (Unanimous)	5	3:00
Lost the Onesongchai S-1 Junior Lightweight title
2022-10-02	Draw	(Thailand) YodSiam SorJor.Vichitpadriew	Muaydee VitheeThai + Jitmuangnon, OrTorGor.3 Stadium	Nonthaburi province, Thailand	Decision	5	3:00
2022-07-31	Win	(Thailand) Deuan Jitmuangnon	Muaydee VitheeThai + Jitmuangnon, OrTorGor.3 Stadium	Nonthaburi province, Thailand	Decision	5	3:00
2022-07-04	Loss	(Thailand) Yodkitsada Sor.Sommai	Muay Thai Pantamit, Thupatemi Stadium	Pathum Thani, Thailand	Decision	5	3:00
2022-05-07	Win	(Thailand) Muangsap NayokwitThungSong	Omnoi Stadium	Samut Sakhon, Thailand	Decision	5	3:00
2022-03-26	Win	(Thailand) Nawaek Sitchefboontham	Onesongchai, OrTorGor.3 Stadium	Nonthaburi province, Thailand	Decision	5	3:00
Defends Onesongchai S-1 Junior Lightweight title
2022-02-24	Win	(Thailand) Apiwat Sor.Somnuk	Onesongchai	Chachoengsao province, Thailand	Decision	5	3:00
Wins Onesongchai S-1 Junior Lightweight title
2021-11-28	Loss	(Thailand) Apiwat Sor.Somnuk	Muaydeevitheethai, Blue Arena	Samut Prakan, Thailand	Decision	5	3:00
2021-02-14	Loss	(Thailand) Thongsiam Muadwititchiangmai	Blue Arena	Samut Prakan, Thailand	Decision	5	3:00
2020-11-07	Loss	(Thailand) Chorfah Tor.Sangtiennoi	SAT HERO SERIES, World Siam Stadium	Bangkok, Thailand	KO	3	
2020-10-03	Loss	(Thailand) Prajanban Sor.Jor.Wichitmuangpradriew	Or.Tor.Gor.3 Stadium	Nonthaburi, Thailand	Decision	5	3:00
2020-09-06	Win	(Thailand) Khanongsuk Kor.Kampanat	Blue Arena	Samut Prakan, Thailand	Decision	5	3:00
2020-08-08	Win	(Thailand) Thongsiam MuadwititChiangMai	Thanakorn Stadium	Nakhon Pathom, Thailand	Decision	5	3:00
2020-07-18	Win	(Thailand) KomAwut F.A.Group	Thanakorn Stadium	Nakhon Pathom, Thailand	Decision	5	3:00
2020-02-24	Loss	(Thailand) Gingsanglek Tor.Laksong	Rajadamnern Stadium	Bangkok, Thailand	Decision	5	3:00
2020-01-13	Win	(Thailand) Hercules Phetsimean	Rajadamnern Stadium	Bangkok, Thailand	Decision	5	3:00
2019-12-12	Win	(Thailand) Hercules Phetsimean	Rajadamnern Stadium	Bangkok, Thailand	Decision	5	3:00
2019-11-07	Win	(Thailand) Kumantong Jitmuangnon	Rajadamnern Stadium	Bangkok, Thailand	Decision	5	3:00
2019-10-07	Win	(Thailand) Masuk Or.Bor.Tor.Kampi	Rajadamnern Stadium	Bangkok, Thailand	KO	3	
2019-08-29	Loss	(Thailand) Apiwat Sor.Somnuk	Rajadamnern Stadium	Bangkok, Thailand	Decision	5	3:00
2019-08-07	Loss	(Thailand) Kumantong Jitmuangnon	Rajadamnern Stadium	Bangkok, Thailand	Decision	5	3:00
2019-06-24	Draw	(Thailand) Yodkhuntab Sor.Kor.Sungaigym	Rajadamnern Stadium	Bangkok, Thailand	Decision	5	3:00
2019-05-25	Win	(Thailand) Phetkriangkrai Tor.Silachai	Thanakorn Stadium	Nakhon Pathom, Thailand	Decision	5	3:00
2019-03-28	Loss	(Thailand) Apiwat Sor.Somnuk	Rajadamnern Stadium	Bangkok, Thailand	Decision	5	3:00
2019-02-28	Loss	(Thailand) Suriyanlek Or.Bor.Tor.Kampi	Rajadamnern Stadium	Bangkok, Thailand	Decision	5	3:00
2019-01-14	Loss	(Thailand) Apiwat Sor.Somnuk	Rajadamnern Stadium	Bangkok, Thailand	Decision	5	3:00
2018-12-13	Win	(Thailand) Yodkhuntab Sor.Kor.Sungaigym	Rajadamnern Stadium	Bangkok, Thailand	Decision	5	3:00
2018-11-21	Win	(Thailand) Yodkhuntab Sor.Kor.Sungaigym	Rajadamnern Stadium	Bangkok, Thailand	Decision	5	3:00
2018-10-30	Loss	(Thailand) Messi Pangkongpap	Rajadamnern Stadium	Bangkok, Thailand	Decision	5	3:00
2018-09-20	Loss	(Thailand) Kiewpayak Jitmuangnon	Rajadamnern Stadium	Bangkok, Thailand	Decision	5	3:00
2018-08-06	Loss	(Thailand) Chorfah Tor.Sangtiennoi	Rajadamnern Stadium	Bangkok, Thailand	Decision	5	3:00
2018-06-21	Win	(Thailand) Pakkalek Tor.Laksong	Rajadamnern Stadium	Bangkok, Thailand	Decision	5	3:00
2018-05-02	Win	(Thailand) Morakot Mor.Rattanabandit	Rajadamnern Stadium	Bangkok, Thailand	Decision	5	3:00
2018-04-02	Loss	(Thailand) Chorfah Tor.Sangtiennoi	Rajadamnern Stadium	Bangkok, Thailand	Decision	5	3:00
2018-02-14	Draw	(Thailand) Chorfah Tor.Sangtiennoi	Rajadamnern Stadium	Bangkok, Thailand	Decision	5	3:00
2018-01-24	Win	(Thailand) Ploywitthaya Petsimuen	Rajadamnern Stadium	Bangkok, Thailand	Decision	5	3:00
2017-12-07	Loss	(Thailand) Ploywitthaya Petsimuen	Rajadamnern Stadium	Bangkok, Thailand	Decision	5	3:00
2017-11-02	Loss	(Thailand) Pakkalek Tor.Laksong	Rajadamnern Stadium	Bangkok, Thailand	KO	3	
2017-09-06	Loss	(Thailand) Morakot Mor.Rattanabandit	Rajadamnern Stadium	Bangkok, Thailand	Decision	5	3:00
2017-07-13	Win	(Thailand) KomAwut F.A.Group	Rajadamnern Stadium	Bangkok, Thailand	Decision	5	3:00
2017-06-07	Loss	(Thailand) Chanasuk Kor.Kampanat	Rajadamnern Stadium	Bangkok, Thailand	Decision	5	3:00
2017-05-03	Loss	(Thailand) Ploywitthaya Petsimuen	Rajadamnern Stadium	Bangkok, Thailand	Decision	5	3:00
2017-03-30	Loss	(Thailand) Chorfah Tor.Sangtiennoi	Rajadamnern Stadium	Bangkok, Thailand	Decision	5	3:00
2017-02-22	Draw	(Thailand) Morakot Mor.Rattanabandit	Rajadamnern Stadium	Bangkok, Thailand	Decision	5	3:00
2017-01-30	Loss	(Thailand) Morakot Mor.Rattanabandit	Rajadamnern Stadium	Bangkok, Thailand	Decision	5	3:00
2017-01-12	Loss	(Thailand) Chorfah Tor.Sangtiennoi	Rajadamnern Stadium	Bangkok, Thailand	Decision	5	3:00
2016-12-15	Loss	(Thailand) Khunhan Chor.Hapayak	Rajadamnern Stadium	Bangkok, Thailand	Decision	5	3:00
2016-11-19	Win	(Thailand) Khunhan Chor.Hapayak	Montree Studio	Bangkok, Thailand	Decision	5	3:00
2016-10-13	Win	(Thailand) Yodmongkhol Muangsima	Rajadamnern Stadium	Bangkok, Thailand	Decision	5	3:00
2016-09-14	Loss	(Thailand) Phonpanlan P.K.Saenchaimuaythaigym	Rajadamnern Stadium	Bangkok, Thailand	Decision	5	3:00
2016-08-04	Win	(Thailand) Phetmuangchon Sudsakornmuaythai	Rajadamnern Stadium	Bangkok, Thailand	Decision	5	3:00
2016-07-08	Win	(Thailand) Suakim P.K.Saenchaimuaythaigym	Lumpinee Stadium	Bangkok, Thailand	Decision	5	3:00
2016-06-12	Loss	(Thailand) Suakim P.K.Saenchaimuaythaigym	Rangsit Boxing Stadium	Rangsit, Thailand	Decision	5	3:00
2016-05-19	Win	(Thailand) Ploywitthaya Petsimuen	Rajadamnern Stadium	Bangkok, Thailand	Decision	5	3:00
2016-03-31	Win	(Thailand) Prajanchai P.K.Saenchaimuaythaigym	Rajadamnern Stadium	Bangkok, Thailand	Decision	5	3:00
2016-03-05	Win	(Thailand) Ploywitthaya Petsimuen	Montree Studio	Bangkok, Thailand	Decision	5	3:00
2016-02-06	Win	(Thailand) Chanasuk Kor.Kampanat	Siam Omnoi Stadium	Samut Sakhon, Thailand	Decision	5	3:00
2015-11-07	Loss	(Thailand) Changsuk Kiatsongrit	Montree Studio	Bangkok, Thailand	Decision	5	3:00
2015-10-14	Loss	(Thailand) Chorfah Tor.Sangtiennoi	Rajadamnern Stadium	Bangkok, Thailand	Decision	5	3:00
2015-09-05	Loss	(Thailand) Yodmongkhol Muangsima	Montree Studio	Bangkok, Thailand	Decision	5	3:00
2015-08-10	Loss	(Thailand) Yodmongkhol Muangsima	Rajadamnern Stadium	Bangkok, Thailand	Decision	5	3:00
2015-07-09	Loss	(Thailand) Phetlamsin Chor.Hapayak	Rajadamnern Stadium	Bangkok, Thailand	Decision	5	3:00
2015-06-04	Win	(Thailand) Yodmongkhol Tor.Laksong	Rajadamnern Stadium	Bangkok, Thailand	Decision	5	3:00
2015-05-07	Loss	(Thailand) Pakkalek Tor.Laksong	Rajadamnern Stadium	Bangkok, Thailand	Decision	5	3:00
2015-03-30	Loss	(Thailand) Pakkalek Tor.Laksong	Rajadamnern Stadium	Bangkok, Thailand	Decision	5	3:00
2015-02-12	Loss	(Thailand) Prajanchai P.K.Saenchaimuaythaigym	Rajadamnern Stadium	Bangkok, Thailand	Decision	5	3:00
2015-01-08	Loss	(Thailand) Panpayak Jitmuangnon	Rajadamnern Stadium	Bangkok, Thailand	Decision	5	3:00
2014-12-01	Win	(Thailand) Phetlamsin Sor.Sungaigym	Rajadamnern Stadium	Bangkok, Thailand	Decision	5	3:00
2014-10-08	Win	(Thailand) Prajanchai Por.Phetnamtong	Rajadamnern Stadium	Bangkok, Thailand	Decision	5	3:00
2014-09-11	Loss	(Thailand) Surachai Srisuriyanyothin	Rajadamnern Stadium	Bangkok, Thailand	Decision	5	3:00
2014-08-14	Win	(Thailand) Sangmanee Sor Tienpo	Rajadamnern Stadium	Bangkok, Thailand	Decision	5	3:00
2014-07-16	Win	(Thailand) Chorfah Tor.Sangtiennoi	Rajadamnern Stadium	Bangkok, Thailand	Decision	5	3:00
2014-06-25	Draw	(Thailand) Chorfah Tor.Sangtiennoi	Rajadamnern Stadium	Bangkok, Thailand	Decision	5	3:00
2013-12-02	Win	(Thailand) Thaksinlek Kiatniwat	Lumpinee Stadium	Bangkok, Thailand	Decision	5	3:00
2013-11-06	Loss	(Thailand) Fonluang Sitboonmee	Rajadamnern Stadium	Bangkok, Thailand	Decision	5	3:00
2013-05-23	Win	(Thailand) Naka Kaewsamrit	Rajadamnern Stadium	Bangkok, Thailand	Decision	5	3:00
2012-10-29	Loss	(Thailand) Thanonchai Thanakorngym	Rajadamnern Stadium	Bangkok, Thailand	Decision	5	3:00
2012-09-18	Loss	(Thailand) Phet Utong Or. Kwanmuang	Lumpinee Stadium	Bangkok, Thailand	Decision	5	3:00
2012-08-24	Loss	(Thailand) Newwangchan Pakornpornsurin	Lumpinee Stadium	Bangkok, Thailand	Decision	5	3:00
2012-07-20	Loss	(Thailand) Nongbeer Chokngamwong	Rajadamnern Stadium	Bangkok, Thailand	KO	3	
2012-01-26	Loss	(Thailand) Yodwicha Por.Boonsit	Rajadamnern Stadium	Bangkok, Thailand	Decision	5	3:00
2011-12-22	Loss	(Thailand) Rungrat Tor.Pitakornlakarn	Rajadamnern Stadium	Bangkok, Thailand	Decision	5	3:00
2011-10-20	Win	(Thailand) Singsuriya Alloysrinakorn	Rajadamnern Stadium	Bangkok, Thailand	Decision	5	3:00
2011-08-08	Win	(Thailand) Pajonsuk Por.Pramuk	Rajadamnern Stadium	Bangkok, Thailand	TKO	1	
2011-03-15	Win	(Thailand) Superbank Sakchaichot	Lumpinee Stadium	Bangkok, Thailand	Decision	5	3:00
2011-01-21	Win	(Thailand) Thanonchai Thanakorngym	Lumpinee Stadium	Bangkok, Thailand	Decision	5	3:00
2010-12-25	Win	(Thailand) Khaimookdam Chuwattana	Omnoi Stadium	Samut Sakhon, Thailand	Decision	5	3:00
2010-10-30	Loss	(Thailand) Manasak Pinsinchai	Omnoi Stadium	Samut Sakhon, Thailand	Decision	5	3:00
2010-04-06	Win	(Thailand) Kungwanlek Petchyindee	Lumpinee Stadium	Bangkok, Thailand	Decision	5	3:00
2010-03-02	Win	(Thailand) Nongbeer Chokngamwong	Lumpinee Stadium	Bangkok, Thailand	Decision	5	3:00
2009-11-23	Win	(Thailand) Orono Sitbenjama	Rajadamnern Stadium	Bangkok, Thailand	Decision	5	3:00
2009-09-30	Loss	(Thailand) Pudpadnoi Muangsima	Rajadamnern Stadium	Bangkok, Thailand	Decision	5	3:00
2009-08-06	Win	(Thailand) Thongchai Tor. Silachai	Rajadamnern Stadium	Bangkok, Thailand	TKO (Cut)	4	
2009-07-09	Win	(Thailand) Ponkrit Nampatahoymuk	Rajadamnern Stadium	Bangkok, Thailand	Decision	5	3:00
2009-02-26	Loss	(Thailand) Pakorn Sakyothin	Rajadamnern Stadium	Bangkok, Thailand	Decision	5	3:00
2009-01-14	Win	(Thailand) Chatchainoi GardenSeaview	Rajadamnern Stadium	Bangkok, Thailand	Decision	5	3:00
2008-09-13	Loss	(Thailand) Kaimukkao Sit.Or	Onesongchai	Bangkok, Thailand	Decision	5	3:00
2008-08-07	Loss	(Thailand) Chatchainoi GardenSeaview	Rajadamnern Stadium	Bangkok, Thailand	Decision	5	3:00
2008-07-10	Win	(Thailand) Kaimukkao Sit.Or	Rajadamnern Stadium	Bangkok, Thailand	TKO	5	
2008-06-19	Loss	(Thailand) Pakorn Sakyothin	Rajadamnern Stadium	Bangkok, Thailand	Decision	5	3:00
2008-05-01	Loss	(Thailand) Rittijak Kaewsamrit	Rajadamnern Stadium	Bangkok, Thailand	Decision	5	3:00
2008-04-10	Win	(Thailand) Thongchai Tor. Silachai	Rajadamnern Stadium	Bangkok, Thailand	Decision	5	3:00
2008-02-07	Loss	(Thailand) Khaimookdam Sit-O	Rajadamnern Stadium	Bangkok, Thailand	Decision	5	3:00
2007-10-30	Loss	(Thailand) Thongchai Tor.Silachai	Rajadamnern Stadium	Bangkok, Thailand	Decision	5	3:00
2007-10-04	Loss	(Thailand) Thongchai Tor.Silachai	Rajadamnern Stadium	Bangkok, Thailand	Decision	5	3:00
2007-06-07	Draw	(Thailand) Kwanpichit 13Rienexpress	Rajadamnern Stadium	Bangkok, Thailand	Decision	5	3:00
2007-05-07	Win	(Thailand) Harnchai Kiatyongyut	Rajadamnern Stadium	Bangkok, Thailand	Decision	5	3:00
2007-03-08	Win	(Thailand) Fahsang Tor.Pitakchai	Rajadamnern Stadium	Bangkok, Thailand	Decision	5	3:00
Wins WMC 108 lbs World title
2007-01-22	Win	(Thailand) Palangpon Piriyanoppachai	Rajadamnern Stadium	Bangkok, Thailand	Decision	5	3:00
2006-12-26	Win	(Thailand) Fahsang Tor.Pitakchai	Rajadamnern Stadium	Bangkok, Thailand	Decision	5	3:00
Wins the Rajadamnern Stadium Light Flyweight (108 lbs) title.
2006-10-19	Win	(Thailand) Cobannoi Sitnamkabuan	Rajadamnern Stadium	Bangkok, Thailand	Decision	5	3:00
2006-07-20	Win	(Thailand) Khaimukdam Pomkhwannarong	Rajadamnern Stadium	Bangkok, Thailand	Decision	5	3:00
2006-05-08	Win	(Thailand) Phetsanguan Sitniwat	Rajadamnern Stadium	Bangkok, Thailand	Decision	5	3:00
2006-03-06	Loss	(Thailand) Khaimookdam Pomkhwannarong	Rajadamnern Stadium	Bangkok, Thailand	Decision	5	3:00
2005-12-22	Loss	(Thailand) Norasing Lukbanyai	Rajadamnern Stadium	Bangkok, Thailand	Decision	5	3:00
2005-11-16	Loss	(Thailand) Linglom Tor.Chalermchai	Rajadamnern Stadium	Bangkok, Thailand	Decision	5	3:00
For the Rajadamnern Stadium Light Flyweight (108 lbs) title.
2005-10-20	Loss	(Thailand) Linglom Tor.Chalermchai	Rajadamnern Stadium	Bangkok, Thailand	Decision	5	3:00
2005-09-01	Loss	(Thailand) Prabsuk Sor.Sirilak	Onesongchai, Rajadamnern Stadium	Bangkok, Thailand	Decision	5	3:00
2005-07-28	Win	(Thailand) Palangpon Piriyanoppachai	Rajadamnern Stadium	Bangkok, Thailand	Decision	5	3:00
2005-06-24	Win	(Thailand) Norasing Lukbanyai	Lumpinee Stadium	Bangkok, Thailand	Decision	5	3:00
2005-03-14	Loss	(Thailand) Idoo 13Rienexpress	Rajadamnern Stadium	Bangkok, Thailand	Decision	5	3:00
2005-02-17	Win	(Thailand) Chalermpol Petchsuphan	Onesongchai, Rajadamnern Stadium	Bangkok, Thailand	Decision	5	3:00
2005-01-20	Loss	(Thailand) Palangpon Piriyanoppachai	Rajadamnern Stadium	Bangkok, Thailand	Decision	5	3:00
2004-10-11	Win	(Thailand) Sornthong Kiattipairat	Petchthongkam, Rajadamnern Stadium	Bangkok, Thailand	Decision	5	3:00
2004-08-16	Loss	(Thailand) Weraburutthai Saksomchai	Rajadamnern Stadium	Bangkok, Thailand	Decision	5	3:00
2004-07-19	Win	(Thailand) Binlar Meenayothin	Rajadamnern Stadium	Bangkok, Thailand	Decision	5	3:00
2004-04-19	Win	(Thailand) Sorthong Kiatpraiwat	Rajadamnern Stadium	Bangkok, Thailand	Decision	5	3:00
2004-02-18	Win	(Thailand) Fahrungruang Sor.Poonsawat	Rajadamnern Stadium	Bangkok, Thailand	Decision	5	3:00
2003-10-30	Win	(Thailand) Wanheng Menayothin	Rajadamnern Stadium	Bangkok, Thailand	Decision	5	3:00
2002-10-23	Loss	(Thailand) Petchdam Sitchamong	Rajadamnern Stadium	Bangkok, Thailand	Decision	5	3:00
Legend: Win Loss Draw/No contest Notes
