= Pornsanae Sitmonchai =

Thai former professional Muay Thai fighter (born 1981)

- Born: Tanet Jinjaiyen; August 7, 1981 (age 45); Kanchanaburi, Thailand
- Native name: พรเสน่ห์ ศิษย์มนต์ชัย
- Other names: Pornsaneh 13coinsTower (พรเสน่ห์ 13 เหรียญทาวเวอร์); Phonsaneh Sor.Satchaboon (พรเสน่ห์ ส.สัจบูลย์); Pornsane F.A Group (พรเสน่ห์ เอฟ.เอ.กรุ๊ป)
- Nickname: Provincial Menace (เหน่อมหาภัย)
- Height: 165 cm (5 ft 5 in)
- Division: Super Flyweight; Bantamweight; Super Bantamweight; Featherweight; Super Featherweight
- Style: Muay Thai (Muay Bouk)
- Stance: Orthodox
- Team: Sitmonchai (1993–2015)
- Years active: c. 1992–2017

Kickboxing record
- Total: 224
- Wins: 162
- By knockout: 56
- Losses: 54
- Draws: 8

Tanet Jinjaiyen (Thai: พรเสน่ห์ ศิษย์มนต์ชัย; born August 7, 1981), known professionally as Pornsanae Sitmonchai (Thai: พรเสน่ห์ ศิษย์มนต์ชัย), is a Thai former professional Muay Thai fighter. He is a former two-time Lumpinee Stadium champion and one-time Rajadamnern Stadium champion across three divisions who was famous during the 2000s and 2010s. Nicknamed the "Provincial Menace", he was especially known for his low kicks and aggressive fighting style.

== Biography ==
Pornsanae began training at his home at age 11 and started fighting shortly after. At age 13 he began training at the Sitmonchai gym. He gained popularity in the early 2000s at both Lumpinee Stadium and Rajadamnern Stadium because of his walk forward fighting style. Some of his most famous fights are against Sam-A Kaiyanghadaogym. Despite losing 4 straight to Sam-A, Pornsaneh got a 5th chance to beat him and he did so by winning a split decision. After losing a decision to Kongsak Sitboonmee in December 2010 Pornsaneh took a break from fighting and spent time at a Buddhist temple and at his farm. In August 2011 he returned to the ring and was KO'd by Palangtip Nor Sripuang. In May 2012 he fought for the first time outside of Thailand when he traveled to the Netherlands to face Ilias El Hajoui. On October 13 he once again left Thailand this time to fight in Australia with Michael Thompson. The fight was a modified Thai rules fight with 4 ounce gloves and was contested in an MMA cage.

He fought Yosuke Morii to a split draw on the scorecards of 49-48, 48-49 and 48-48 at RISE/M-1 ~Infinity.II~ in Tokyo, Japan on January 6, 2013.

He TKO'd Yokwitaya Petsimean in two on February 7, 2013.

He beat Kwankao Chor. Rajapatsadu-Esarn by decision in a rematch on February 22, 2013.

In one of the most entertaining fights of the year, Pornsaneh knocked out Saksuriya Gaiyanghadao with a second round high kick at Lumpinee on May 17, 2013.

Pornsaneh lost to Yetkin Ozkul by unanimous decision after a five-round war at Best of Siam 4 in Paris, France, on June 20, 2013.

He best Rungravee Sasiprapa at Siam Warriors in Cork, Ireland, on October 12, 2013 with a KO by way of elbow.

He lost to Genji Umeno by fourth-round TKO due to a cut caused by an elbow at Rikix: No Kick, No Life 2014 in Tokyo, Japan on February 11, 2014.

Pornsanae rematched Yetkin Özkul in a fight for the WBC Muaythai World Lightweight (-61.2 kg/135 lb) Championship at Le Choc des Légendes 2014 in Saint-Ouen, Seine-Saint-Denis, France on March 8, 2014, losing by third-round TKO. There was considerable controversy surrounding the match as the Sitmonchai camp claimed post-fight that Pornsanae had only been informed of the title on the line in the days leading up to the fight and that Özkul had been prevented from making the contracted weight due to stomach problems and instead weighed in around 72 kg/160 lb, although no official weigh-ins took place. Sitmonchai reluctantly accepted the fight due to their dependency on the promoter to pay them and get them back to Thailand.

== Murder charge ==
On the night of July 30, 2020, Pornsanae Sitmonchai (legal name Noppasit Chinjaiyen) was involved in the murder of Sawang Charoenmak, a 43 year old man from Kanchanaburi known by locals for raising cock-fighting chickens. He was suspected of killing the man, as the man's wife had used Pornsanae's wife's phone number when ordering a package online. There was believed to have been no direct issues between the two, despite the small but deadly incident. On the 2nd of August Pornsanae handed himself into police custody, after 3 days in hiding. He is currently incarcerated.

== Titles and accomplishments ==
- Delo Cup champion 110 pounds
- Toyota Marathon
  - Toyota Marathon Bantamweight (118 lbs) Tournament Winner
- Professional Boxing Association of Thailand (PAT)
  - 2010 Thailand Super Featherweight (130 lbs) Champion
- Lumpinee Stadium
  - Lumpinee Stadium Super Featherweight (122 lbs) Champion
  - 2009 Lumpinee Stadium Featherweight (126 lbs) Champion
  - 2010 Lumpinee Stadium Fight of the Year (vs Pakorn Sakyothin)
- World Muaythai Council
  - 2007 WMC World Bantamweight (118 lbs) Champion
- Siam Omnoi Stadium
  - 2014 Omnoi Stadium Super Featherweight (130 lbs) Champion
- Rajadamnern Stadium
  - 2005 Rajadamnern Stadium Super Flyweight (115 lbs) Champion
  - 2014 Rajadamnern Stadium Fight of the Year
- Awards
  - 2009 Siam Kela Fighter of the Year

== Fight record ==
Professional muaythai record
Date	Result	Opponent	Event	Location	Method	Round	Time
2017-12-10	Loss	(Japan) Yosuke Mizuochi	KING OF KNOCK OUT 2017	Tokyo, Japan	KO (punch)	4	1:28
2015-02-14	Win	(Thailand) Phet J.L.Suit	Omnoi Stadium	Samut Sakhon, Thailand	KO	2	
2014-04-18	Win	(Thailand) Phet J.L.Suit	Omnoi Stadium	Samut Sakhon, Thailand	KO	2	
Defends the Omnoi Stadium Super Featherweight (130 lbs) title.
2014-12-20	Loss	(Bosnia and Herzegovina) Denis Purić	Top King World Series 2014	Hong Kong	KO	1	
2014-11-30	Loss	(Japan) Hiroaki Suzuki	S-Cup 65 kg tournament	Tokyo, Japan	KO	3	
2014-11-09	Win	(Thailand) ET Por Tor Tongtavi	Lumpinee Stadium	Bangkok, Thailand	Decision	5	
2014-10-10	Win	(Thailand) Sangtongnoi Tanasukarn	Lumpinee Stadium	Bangkok, Thailand	KO	3	
2014-09-10	Loss	(Thailand) Superlek Kiatmuu9	Rajadamnern Stadium	Bangkok, Thailand	KO (head kick)	1	2:59
2014-08-16	Loss	(Thailand) Rungravee Sasiprapa	Sandee & Siam Warriors Muay Thai Super Fights	Dublin, Ireland	Decision	5	3:00
2014-07-08	Loss	(Thailand) Pokaew Fonjangchonburi	Lumpinee Stadium	Bangkok, Thailand	TKO (punches)	2	
2014-04-19	Win	(Thailand) Manaowan Sitsongpeenong	Omnoi Stadium	Samut Sakhon, Thailand	KO	2	
Wins the Omnoi Stadium Super Featherweight (130 lbs) title.
2014-03-08	Loss	(Turkey) Yetkin Özkul	Le Choc des Légendes 2014	Saint-Ouen, France	TKO (punches)	3	0:52
2014-02-11	Loss	(Japan) Genji Umeno	Rikix: No Kick, No Life 2014	Tokyo, Japan	TKO (cut)	4	0:48
2014-01-03	Loss	(Thailand) Kwankhao Mor.Ratanabandit	Lumpinee Stadium	Bangkok, Thailand	KO (elbow)	3	
2013-12-21	Win	(Thailand) Leklaa Thanasuratnakorn	11th Military Academy	Bangkok, Thailand	KO (high kick)	1	
2013-11-12	Win	(Thailand) Tingtong Chor Kor.Yuha-Isuzu	Lumpinee Stadium	Bangkok, Thailand	Decision	5	
2013-10-12	Win	(Thailand) Rungravee Sasiprapa	Siam Warriors	Cork, Ireland	KO (Right Elbow)	3	
2013-09-03	Loss	(Thailand) Kwankhao Mor.Ratanabandit	Lumpinee Stadium	Bangkok, Thailand	TKO (cuts)	4	
2013-06-20	Loss	(Turkey) Yetkin Ozkul	Best of Siam 4	Paris, France	Decision (unanimous)	5	3:00
2013-05-17	Win	(Thailand) Saksuriya Kaiyanghadaw	Lumpinee Stadium	Bangkok, Thailand	KO (high kick)	2	
2013-04-09	Loss	(Thailand) Palangtip Nor.Sripueng	Lumpinee Stadium	Bangkok, Thailand	Decision	5	3:00
2013-02-22	Win	(Thailand) Kwankhao Mor.Ratanabandit	Rajadamnern Stadium	Bangkok, Thailand	Decision	5	3:00
2013-02-07	Win	(Thailand) Yokwitaya Petsimean	Rajadamnern Stadium	Bangkok, Thailand	TKO	2	
2013-01-06	Draw	(Japan) Yosuke Morii	RISE/M-1 ~Infinity.II~	Tokyo, Japan	Decision (split)	5	3:00
2012-11-03	Win	(Thailand) Kwankhao Mor.Ratanabandit		Thailand	TKO	3	
2012-10-13	Loss	(Australia) Michael Thompson	Caged Muay Thai	Australia	Decision	3	3:00
2012-09-15	Win	(Thailand) Kongnapa Sirimongkol		Thailand	TKO	3	
2012--	Loss	(Thailand) Rodlek Jaotalaytong		Thailand	KO (head kick)		
2012-07-06	Loss	(Thailand) Palangtip Nor Sripuang	Lumpinee Stadium	Bangkok, Thailand	Decision	5	3:00
2012-05-27	Win	(Netherlands) Ilias El Hajoui	SLAMM	Netherlands	Decision	5	3:00
2012-03-02	Loss	(Thailand) Tingtong Chor Koiyuhaisuzu	Lumpinee Stadium	Bangkok, Thailand	Decision	5	3:00
2012-01-10	Loss	(Thailand) Palangtip Nor Sripuang	Lumpinee Stadium	Bangkok, Thailand	KO (elbow)	4	
2011-12-09	Loss	(Thailand) Thong Puideenaidee	Lumpinee Stadium	Bangkok, Thailand	Decision	5	3:00
2011-10-07	Win	(Thailand) Yuttachai Kiatpataraan	Lumpini Stadium	Bangkok, Thailand	TKO	1	
2011-08-23	Loss	(Thailand) Palangtip Nor Sripuang	Lumpinee Stadium	Bangkok, Thailand	KO (elbow)	3	
2010-12-07	Loss	(Thailand) Kongsak Sitboonmee	Lumpinee Stadium	Bangkok, Thailand	Decision	5	3:00
For the vacant Lumpinee Stadium Featherweight (126 lbs) title.
2010-11-02	Loss	(Thailand) Noppakrit Kor Kampanart	Lumpinee Stadium	Bangkok, Thailand	Decision	5	3:00
2010-10-05	Loss	(Thailand) Singtongnoi Por.Telakun	Lumpinee Stadium	Bangkok, Thailand	Decision	5	3:00
Loses the Lumpinee Stadium Featherweight (126 lbs) title and fails to capture the vacant WMC World 126 lbs title.
2010-08-10	Loss	(Thailand) Nong-O Kaiyanghadaogym	Lumpinee Stadium	Bangkok, Thailand	Decision	5	3:00
2010-07-13	Win	(Thailand) Dokmaipa Wor Sangprapai	Lumpinee Stadium	Bangkok, Thailand	TKO	3	
Wins the vacant Thailand Super Featherweight (130 lbs) title.
2010-06-10	Loss	(Thailand) Pakorn PKSaenchaimuaythaigym	Rajadamnern Stadium	Bangkok, Thailand	Decision	5	3:00
2010-03-05	Loss	(Thailand) Pakorn PKSaenchaimuaythaigym	Lumpinee Stadium	Bangkok, Thailand	Decision	5	3:00
2010-02-10	Win	(Thailand) Sam-A Kaiyanghadaogym	Rajadamnern Stadium	Bangkok, Thailand	Decision	5	3:00
2009-12-29	Win	(Thailand) F-16 Rachanon	Lumpinee Stadium	Bangkok, Thailand	TKO	3	
2009-12-08	Win	(Thailand) Traijak Sitjomtrai	Lumpinee Stadium	Bangkok, Thailand	TKO	3	
Wins the Lumpinee Stadium Featherweight (126 lbs) title.
2009-10-30	Win	(Thailand) Yodchat Fairtex	Lumpinee Stadium	Bangkok, Thailand	TKO	3	
2009-09-25	Loss	(Thailand) Sam-A Kaiyanghadaogym	Lumpinee Stadium	Bangkok, Thailand	Decision	5	3:00
2009-08-06	Loss	(Thailand) Manasak Sitniwat	Rajadamnern Stadium	Bangkok, Thailand	Decision	5	3:00
2009-07-03	Win	(Thailand) Wuttidet Lukprabat	Lumpinee Stadium	Bangkok, Thailand	TKO	2	
2009-05-26	Loss	(Thailand) Sam-A Kaiyanghadaogym	Lumpinee Stadium	Bangkok, Thailand	Decision	5	3:00
2009-04-03	Win	(Thailand) Rungruanglek Lukprabat	Lumpinee Stadium	Bangkok, Thailand	TKO	2	
2009-03-13	Win	(Thailand) Detnarong Sitjaboon	Lumpinee Stadium	Bangkok, Thailand	TKO	3	
2009-02-06	Loss	(Thailand) Sam-A Kaiyanghadaogym	Lumpinee Stadium	Bangkok, Thailand	Decision	5	3:00
For the Lumpinee Stadium Super Bantamweight (122 lbs) title.
2009-01-06	Loss	(Thailand) Sam-A Kaiyanghadaogym	Lumpinee Stadium	Bangkok, Thailand	Decision	5	3:00
2008-12-09	Win	(Thailand) Janrob Sakhomsin	Lumpinee Stadium	Bangkok, Thailand	TKO	1	
2008-10-08	Win	(Thailand) Detsuriya Sitthiprassert	Rajadamnern Stadium	Bangkok, Thailand	TKO	2	
2008-09-10	Win	(Thailand) Pandin Sor Damrongrit	Rajadamnern Stadium	Bangkok, Thailand	TKO	2	
2008-08-20	Win	(Thailand) Payannoi Sor Aranya	Rajadamnern Stadium	Bangkok, Thailand	TKO	1	
2008-06-09	Loss	(Thailand) Thong Puideenaidee	Rajadamnern Stadium	Bangkok, Thailand	Decision	5	3:00
2008-04-10	Loss	(Thailand) Khaimookdam Ekbangsai	Rajadamnern Stadium	Bangkok, Thailand	KO (High kick)	3	
2008-01-30	Loss	(Thailand) Rittijak Kaewsamrit	Rajadamnern Stadium	Bangkok, Thailand	Decision	5	3:00
2007-09-26	Win	(Thailand) Phromongkol Sakhiranchai	Rajadamnern Stadium	Bangkok, Thailand	KO (Punches)	3	
2007-05-07	Loss	(Thailand) Ponmongkol Sakhiranchai	Rajadamnern Stadium	Bangkok, Thailand	Decision	5	3:00
2007-	Loss	(Thailand) Rittijak Kaewsamrit	Bangkok Boxing Stadium - Mitsubishi Triton Tournament, Semifinals	Bangkok, Thailand	Decision	5	3:00
2007-03-08	Win	(Thailand) Chatchainoi GardenSeaview	Rajadamnern Stadium	Bangkok, Thailand	KO (Right hook)	4	
Wins the vacant WMC World Bantamweight (118 lbs) title.
2007-01-20	Win	(Thailand) Phayasuea GardenSeaview	Bangkok Boxing Stadium - Mitsubishi Triton Tournament Group Stage	Bangkok, Thailand	Decision	5	3:00
2006-	Draw	(Thailand) Phetmanee Phetsuphapan		Bangkok, Thailand	Decision	5	3:00
2006-09-06	Draw	(Thailand) Sonnarai Tawan	Rajadamnern Stadium	Bangkok, Thailand	Decision	5	3:00
2006-08-29	Loss	(Thailand) Pinsiam Sor.Amnuaysirichoke	Lumpinee Stadium	Bangkok, Thailand	Decision	5	3:00
2006-05-04	Loss	(Thailand) Kanachai Kor Bankui	Rajadamnern Stadium	Bangkok, Thailand	TKO	4	
2006-04-04	Win	(Thailand) Dendanai Kiatsakongka	Lumpinee Stadium	Bangkok, Thailand	Decision	5	3:00
2006-03-03	Win	(Thailand) Erawan Narupai	Lumpinee Stadium	Bangkok, Thailand	Decision	5	3:00
2005-12-21	Loss	(Thailand) Rattansak Wor Valapon	Rajadamnern Stadium	Bangkok, Thailand	TKO	2	
2005-09-15	Win	(Thailand) Thongchai Tor. Silachai	Rajadamnern Stadium	Bangkok, Thailand	Decision	5	3:00
2005-08-08	Win	(Thailand) Sayannoi Kiatprapat	Rajadamnern Stadium	Bangkok, Thailand	Decision	5	3:00
2005-07-06	Win	(Thailand) Chatchainoi Sitbenjama	Rajadamnern Stadium	Bangkok, Thailand	Decision	5	3:00
2005-05-16	Win	(Thailand) Tubnar Sitromzai	Rajadamnern Stadium	Bangkok, Thailand	TKO	1	
2005-02-14	Win	(Thailand) Wannar Kaennorasing	Rajadamnern Stadium	Bangkok, Thailand	Decision	5	3:00
Wins the vacant Rajadamnern Stadium Super Flyweight (115 lbs) title.
2005-01-05	Win	(Thailand) Kwanpichit 13 REin Express	Rajadamnern Stadium	Bangkok, Thailand	TKO	1	
2005-	Loss	(Thailand) Narunart Chengsimaewgym		Bangkok, Thailand	TKO	3	3:00
2004-12-06	Win	(Thailand) Phayser Sor Hengjaren	Rajadamnern Stadium	Bangkok, Thailand	TKO	3	
2004-11-11	Loss	(Thailand) Thongchai Tor. Silachai	Rajadamnern Stadium	Bangkok, Thailand	Decision	5	3:00
2004-10-04	Win	(Thailand) Rungruanglek Lukprabat	Rajadamnern Stadium	Bangkok, Thailand	Decision	5	3:00
2004-07-30	Loss	(Thailand) Phongsing Kiatchansing	Lumpinee Stadium	Bangkok, Thailand	Decision	5	3:00
2004-06-03	Win	(Thailand) Chatchainoi Sitbenjama	Rajadamnern Stadium	Bangkok, Thailand	KO	3	
2004-04-08	Loss	(Thailand) Kwanpichit Hor.Pattanachai	Rajadamnern Stadium	Bangkok, Thailand	Decision (Split)	5	3:00
2004-02-16	Loss	(Thailand) Saenchainoi Seandeatgym	Rajadamnern Stadium	Bangkok, Thailand	Decision	5	3:00
2003-12-21	Win	(Thailand) Saenchainoi Seandeatgym	Rajadamnern Stadium	Bangkok, Thailand	Decision	5	3:00
2003-11-02	Win	(Thailand) Orono Muangsima	Rajadamnern Stadium	Bangkok, Thailand	KO	2	
2003-08-29	Loss	(Thailand) Pinsiam Sor.Amnuaysirichoke	Lumpinee Stadium	Bangkok, Thailand	Decision	5	3:00
2003-07-04	Loss	(Thailand) Pinsiam Sor.Amnuaysirichoke	Lumpinee Stadium	Bangkok, Thailand	Decision	5	3:00
2003-02-18	Loss	(Thailand) Yodsanklai Fairtex	Fairtex, Lumpinee Stadium	Bangkok, Thailand	KO (High kick)	4	
2003-01-14	Win	(Thailand) Yodsanklai Fairtex	Petpanomurung, Lumpinee Stadium	Bangkok, Thailand	KO	3	
2002-08-29	Win	(Thailand) Krunoi Sor.Kingstar	Rajadamnern Stadium	Thailand	Decision	5	3:00
2002-05-07	Win	(Thailand) Petchmanee Petchsuphanphan	Lumpinee Stadium	Bangkok, Thailand	Decision	5	3:00
2001-11-07	Win	(Thailand) Bovy Sor Udomson	Rajadamnern Stadium	Thailand	Decision	5	3:00
2001-	Loss	(Thailand) Thongchai Tor. Silachai		Thailand	Decision	5	3:00
2001-08-29		(Thailand) Puja Sor.Suwanee	Rajadamnern Stadium	Thailand			
2001-07-09		(Thailand) Phetmanee Phetsuphapan	Rajadamnern Stadium	Thailand			
2001-02-22	Win	(Thailand) ThodtTailek NakornthongParkView	Rajadamnern Stadium	Thailand	Decision	5	3:00
1999-05-25	Win	(Thailand) Denpayak Wor.Singhsen	Lumpinee Stadium	Thailand	Decision	5	3:00
1999-01-22	Win	(Thailand) Chokchainoi 13CoinTower	Lumpinee Stadium	Thailand	Decision	5	3:00
Legend: Win Loss Draw/No contest Notes
