= Puja Sor.Suwanee =

Thai former professional Muay Thai fighter

- Born: Wongtrakun Khankam; October 3, 1983 (age 43); Phibun Mangsahan, Ubon Ratchathani, Thailand
- Other names: Phuja Sor.Suwannee; Pooja Sor Suwanee; Puja Kiatthirasak
- Height: 168 cm (5 ft 6 in)
- Style: Muay Thai; Femur
- Stance: Southpaw
- Team: Sor.Suwanee; 13 Rean Resort
- Trainer: Densayam Sor.Prateep

Wongtrakun Khankam, known professionally as Puja Sor.Suwanee (Thai: ปูจ๋า ส.สุวรรณี), is a Thai former professional Muay Thai fighter.

== Biography and career ==
Puja was born in the Ubon Ratchathani province of Thailand where he started training in Muay Thai at the age of 12 in the Sor Suwanee camp. He later became a notable fighter of the Onesongchai promotion and captured the 108 lbs Lumpinee Stadium belt. During his career Puja defeated notable champions such as Chatchainoi Sitbenjama, Wuttidet Lukprabat, Bovy Sor Udomson, Phet-Ek Sitjaopho, Kem Sitsongpeenong, Nongbee Kiatyongyut, Anuwat Kaewsamrit, Jaroenchai Kesagym or Phetasawin Seatranferry.

On April 11, 2009 Puja faced Nopparat Keatkhamtorn in the Phra Nakhon Si Ayutthaya province. He lost the fight by decision.

On May 2, 2009 Puja faced Bovy Sor Udomson for the vacant Onesongchai S1 world title. He lost the fight by decision.

On September 9, 2009, Puja defeated Ikkyu-san Kor.Rungthanakiat by fourth round technical knockout with a high kick at the Omnoi Stadium.

On November 4, 2009, Puja defeated Saenchainoi Phumpanmuang by decision at the Omnoi Stadium as part of the Isuzu Cup.

== Titles and accomplishments ==
- Rajadamnern Stadium
  - 2003 Rajadamnern Stadium Fighter of the Year
- Lumpinee Stadium
  - 2000 Lumpinee Stadium Light Flyweight (108 lbs) Champion

== Fight record ==
Muay Thai record
96 Wins (8 (T)KOs), 36 Losses, 4 Draws
| Date | Result | Opponent | Event | Location | Method | Round | Time |
| 2010-01-30 | Win | (Thailand) Phetasawin Seatranferry | Omnoi Stadium - Isuzu Cup | Samut Sakhon, Thailand | TKO | 4 | |
| 2009-12-05 | Loss | (Thailand) Tukkatatong Phetpayathai | Omnoi Stadium - Isuzu Cup | Samut Sakhon, Thailand | Decision | 5 | 3:00 |
| 2009-11-14 | Win | (Thailand) Saenchainoi Phumpanmuang | Omnoi Stadium - Isuzu Cup | Samut Sakhon, Thailand | Decision | 5 | 3:00 |
| 2009-10-18 | Loss | (Thailand) Sagetdao Petpayathai | Channel 7 Stadium | Bangkok, Thailand | Decision | 5 | 3:00 |
| 2009-09-09 | Win | (Thailand) Ikkyu-san Kor.Rungthanakiat | Omnoi Stadium | Samut Sakhon, Thailand | TKO (High kick) | 4 | |
| 2009-05-02 | Loss | (Thailand) Bovy Sor Udomson | OneSongchai | Thailand | Decision | 5 | 3:00 |
For the S1 World Lightweight (135 lbs) title.
| 2009-04-11 | Loss | (Thailand) Nopparat Keatkhamtorn | | Phra Nakhon Si Ayutthaya, Thailand | Decision | 5 | 3:00 |
| 2009-01-14 | Win | (Thailand) Petchsongwan Sitniwat | Onesongchai, Rajadamnern Stadium | Bangkok, Thailand | KO | 4 | |
| 2008-12-22 | Win | (Thailand) Jaroenchai Kesagym | Daorungchujaroen, Rajadamnern Stadium | Bangkok, Thailand | Decision | 5 | 3:00 |
| 2008-06-12 | Loss | (Thailand) Laemthong Tor.Porchai | Onesongchai | Nakhon Pathom province, Thailand | Decision | 5 | 3:00 |
| 2007-08-30 | Loss | (Thailand) Orono Muangsima | Onesongchai, Rajadamnern Stadium | Bangkok, Thailand | Decision | 5 | 3:00 |
| 2007-06-25 | Loss | (Thailand) Phettaksin Sor.Thamapetch | Onesongchai, Rajadamnern Stadium | Bangkok, Thailand | Decision | 5 | 3:00 |
For the WMC World Super-featherweight (130 lbs) title.
| 2007-03-08 | Win | (Thailand) Orono Muangsima | Onesongchai, Rajadamnern Stadium | Bangkok, Thailand | Decision | 5 | 3:00 |
| 2007-02-05 | Loss | (Thailand) Singtongnoi Por.Telakun | Onesongchai, Rajadamnern Stadium | Bangkok, Thailand | Decision | 5 | 3:00 |
| 2006-11-30 | Loss | (Thailand) Kem Sitsongpeenong | Onesongchai, Rajadamnern Stadium | Bangkok, Thailand | Decision | 5 | 3:00 |
For the Rajadamnern Stadium Super Featherweight (130 lbs) title.
| 2006-10-19 | Win | (Thailand) Nongbee Kiatyongyut | OneSongchai, Rajadamnern Stadium | Bangkok, Thailand | Decision | 5 | 3:00 |
| 2006-08-31 | Draw | (Thailand) Kem Sitsongpeenong | Onesongchai, Rajadamnern Stadium | Bangkok, Thailand | Decision | 5 | 3:00 |
| 2006-07-05 | Win | (Thailand) Anuwat Kaewsamrit | Onesongchai, Rajadamnern Stadium | Bangkok, Thailand | Decision | 5 | 3:00 |
| 2006-05-29 | Win | (Thailand) Saenchainoi Wor.Petchpun | OneSongchai, Rajadamnern Stadium | Bangkok, Thailand | Decision | 5 | 3:00 |
| 2006-03-06 | Win | (Thailand) Orono Tawan | Onesongchai, Rajadamnern Stadium | Bangkok, Thailand | KO | 4 | |
| 2006-01-25 | Loss | (Thailand) Anuwat Kaewsamrit | Daorungchujarean, Rajadamnern Stadium | Bangkok, Thailand | Decision | 5 | 3:00 |
| 2005-12-22 | Win | (Thailand) Saenchainoi Nongkeesuwit | OneSongchai, Rajadamnern Stadium 60th Anniversary Show | Bangkok, Thailand | Decision | 5 | 3:00 |
| 2005-11-16 | Win | (Thailand) Nongbee Kiatyongyut | OneSongchai, Rajadamnern Stadium | Bangkok, Thailand | Decision | 5 | 3:00 |
| 2005-09-20 | Win | (Thailand) Yodbuangam Lukbanyai | Por.Pramuk, Lumpinee Stadium | Bangkok, Thailand | KO (High kick) | 3 | |
| 2005-08-12 | Loss | (Thailand) Nongbee Kiatyongyut | Queens Birthday, Sanam Luang | Bangkok, Thailand | Decision | 5 | 3:00 |
| 2005-04-21 | Win | (Thailand) Kem Sitsongpeenong | Onesongchai, Rajadamnern Stadium | Bangkok, Thailand | Decision | 5 | 3:00 |
| 2005-03-17 | Win | (Thailand) Nongbee Kiatyongyut | Onesongchai, Rajadamnern Stadium | Bangkok, Thailand | Decision | 5 | 3:00 |
| 2005-02-12 | Win | (Thailand) Nongbee Kiatyongyut | OneSongchai Tsunami Show, Rajamangala Stadium | Bangkok, Thailand | Decision | 5 | 3:00 |
| 2004-12-29 | Loss | (Thailand) Itsarasak Jor.Rachdakorn | Onesongchai, Rajadamnern Stadium | Bangkok, Thailand | Decision | 5 | 3:00 |
| 2004-10-25 | Loss | (Thailand) Anuwat Kaewsamrit | Palokmuaythai, Omnoi Stadium | Bangkok, Thailand | TKO | 2 | |
| 2004-08-16 | Draw | (Thailand) Nongbee Kiatyongyut | Onesongchai, Rajadamnern Stadium | Bangkok, Thailand | Decision | 5 | 3:00 |
| 2004-07-13 | Win | (Thailand) Itsarasak Jor.Rachdakorn | Petchsuphapan, Lumpinee Stadium | Bangkok, Thailand | Decision | 5 | 3:00 |
| 2004-05-05 | Loss | (Thailand) Saenchai Sor.Kingstar | Jaobunlunglok, Rajadamnern Stadium | Bangkok, Thailand | Decision | 5 | 3:00 |
| 2004-04-08 | Win | (Thailand) Klairung Sor.SasipaGym | Onesongchai, Rajadamnern Stadium | Bangkok, Thailand | Decision | 5 | 3:00 |
| 2004-03-04 | Win | (Thailand) Yodbuangam Lukbanyai | Onesongchai, Rajadamnern Stadium | Bangkok, Thailand | Decision | 5 | 3:00 |
| 2004-01-13 | Loss | (Thailand) Yodbuangam Lukbanyai | Praianan, Lumpinee Stadium | Bangkok, Thailand | Decision | 5 | 3:00 |
| 2003-11-26 | Win | (Thailand) Kem Sitsongpeenong | Phetthongkham, Rajadamnern Stadium | Bangkok, Thailand | Decision | 5 | 3:00 |
| 2003-10-30 | Win | (Thailand) Bovy Sor Udomson | Onesongchai, Rajadamnern Stadium | Bangkok, Thailand | Decision | 5 | 3:00 |
| 2003-10-02 | Win | (Thailand) Phet-Ek Sitjaopho | Onesongchai, Rajadamnern Stadium | Bangkok, Thailand | Decision | 5 | 3:00 |
| 2003- | Win | (Thailand) Bovy Sor Udomson | Rajadamnern Stadium | Bangkok, Thailand | Decision | 5 | 3:00 |
| 2003-07-20 | Win | (Thailand) Bovy Sor Udomson | Onesongchai, Rajadamnern Stadium | Bangkok, Thailand | Decision | 5 | 3:00 |
| 2003-06-23 | Draw | (Thailand) Phet-Ek Sitjaopho | Onesongchai, Rajadamnern Stadium | Bangkok, Thailand | Decision | 5 | 3:00 |
| 2003-05-08 | Win | (Thailand) Phetto Sitjaopho | Onesongchai, Rajadamnern Stadium | Bangkok, Thailand | Decision | 5 | 3:00 |
| 2003-04-10 | Draw | (Thailand) Phetto Sitjaopho | Onesongchai, Rajadamnern Stadium | Bangkok, Thailand | Decision | 5 | 3:00 |
| 2003-03-03 | Win | (Thailand) Wanpichit Sitjamlong | Rajadamnern Stadium | Bangkok, Thailand | Decision | 5 | 3:00 |
| 2003-02-03 | Win | (Thailand) Kongprai Por.Pinyo | Phetthongkham, Rajadamnern Stadium | Bangkok, Thailand | Decision | 5 | 3:00 |
| 2002-11-07 | Loss | (Thailand) Wanmeechai Meenayothin | Onesongchai, Rajadamnern Stadium | Bangkok, Thailand | Decision | 5 | 3:00 |
| 2002-10-17 | Win | (Thailand) Paruhatlek Sitjamee | Rajadamnern Stadium | Bangkok, Thailand | Decision | 5 | 3:00 |
| 2002-09-09 | Loss | (Thailand) Kem Sitsongpeenong | Onesongchai, Rajadamnern Stadium | Bangkok, Thailand | Decision | 5 | 3:00 |
| 2002-08-07 | Win | (Thailand) Ngathao Attharungroj | Rajadamnern Stadium | Bangkok, Thailand | Decision | 5 | 3:00 |
| 2002-06-24 | Loss | (Thailand) Duwao Kong-Udom | Rajadamnern Stadium | Bangkok, Thailand | Decision | 5 | 3:00 |
| 2002-05-13 | Win | (Thailand) Michael Sor.Sakulphan | Onesongchai, Rajadamnern Stadium | Bangkok, Thailand | Decision | 5 | 3:00 |
| 2002-04-22 | Win | (Thailand) Wuttidet Lukprabat | Onesongchai, Rajadamnern Stadium | Bangkok, Thailand | Decision | 5 | 3:00 |
| 2002-03-20 | Win | (Thailand) Rattanasak Wor.Walaphon | Rajadamnern Stadium | Bangkok, Thailand | Decision | 5 | 3:00 |
| 2002-02-27 | Loss | (Thailand) Wanmeechai Meenayothin | Onesongchai, Rajadamnern Stadium | Bangkok, Thailand | Decision | 5 | 3:00 |
| 2002-01-14 | Loss | (Thailand) Thongchai Tor.Silachai | Wanmuaythai + Onesongchai, Rajadamnern Stadium | Bangkok, Thailand | Decision | 5 | 3:00 |
| 2001-08-29 | | (Thailand) Pornsanae Sitmonchai | Rajadamnern Stadium | Thailand | | | |
| 2001-06-07 | Loss | (Thailand) Bovy Sor Udomson | Onesongchai, Rajadamnern Stadium | Thailand | KO | 2 | |
| 2001-03-22 | Loss | (Thailand) Thongchai Tor.Silachai | Onesongchai, Rajadamnern Stadium | Bangkok, Thailand | Decision | 5 | 3:00 |
| 2000-11-25 | Win | (Thailand) Chatchainoi Sitbenjama | Lumpinee Stadium | Bangkok, Thailand | Decision | 5 | 3:00 |
Wins the Lumpinee Stadium Light Flyweight (108 lbs) title.
| 2000-09-10 | Loss | (Thailand) Chatchainoi Sitbenjama | Samrong Stadium | Samrong, Thailand | Decision | 5 | 3:00 |
| 2000-07-22 | Win | (Thailand) Thewarat Kiatchanasing | Lumpinee Stadium | Bangkok, Thailand | Decision | 5 | 3:00 |
| 2000-06-17 | Win | (Thailand) Sueathai Kiatchansing | Lumpinee Stadium | Bangkok, Thailand | Decision | 5 | 3:00 |
| 2000-02-11 | Win | (Thailand) Gen Hongthonglek | OneSongchai, Lumpinee Stadium | Bangkok, Thailand | Decision | 5 | 3:00 |
Legend: Win Loss Draw/No contest Notes
