= Paipharob Kokietgym =

Thai boxer and muay thai fighter

Personal information
- Nicknames: Jom Knockout (จอมน็อกเอาต์) ("KO King"); Ai Mud Daotok (ไอ้หมัดดาวตก) ("Fist of Meteor")
- Born: Pai Pharob (ไผ่ ผารบ); May 5, 1983 (age 43) Thep Sathit District, Chaiyaphum Province, Thailand
- Weight: Minimumweight; Light Flyweight; Flyweight; Bantamweight

Boxing career

Boxing record
- Total fights: 47
- Wins: 38
- Win by KO: 29
- Losses: 9

Paipharob Kokietgym (Thai: ไผ่ผารบ ก่อเกียรติยิม, born May 5, 1983) is a Thai professional boxer and Muay Thai fighter who was the interim World Boxing Association minimumweight champion.

== Biography and career ==
Paipharob born in Thep Sathit, Chaiyaphum Province in Isan (northeastern region), but grew up and began training in fighting, starting with Muay Thai, under the name "Daoden Singkhlongsi" (ดาวเด่น สิงห์คลองสี่) in Chai Badan, Lopburi Province in central region. He was part of the Singklongsi camp during his Muay Thai career.

== Outside the ring ==
He was arrested on suspicion of trafficking Yaba in Lopburi on January 8, 2012. He was subsequently stripped of his title in May 2012 by the WBA due to his legal issues and apparent inability to make a defense.

== Muay Thai record ==
Muay Thai record
Date	Result	Opponent	Event	Location	Method	Round	Time
2008-06-19	Loss	(Thailand) Khaimookdam Sit-O	Onesongchai, Rajadamnern Stadium	Bangkok, Thailand	Decision	5	3:00
For the vacant Rajadamnern Stadium Super Flyweight (115 lbs) title.
2008-05-08	Win	(Thailand) Thongchai Tor.Silachai	Onesongchai, Rajadamnern Stadium	Bangkok, Thailand	Decision	5	3:00
2008-04-10	Win	(Thailand) Kaimukkao Por.Thairongruangkamai	Onesongchai, Rajadamnern Stadium	Bangkok, Thailand	KO	3	
2008-03-13	Win	(Thailand) Chatpichit Sor.Porchai	Yodwanpadet, Rajadamnern Stadium	Bangkok, Thailand	Decision	5	3:00
2007-08-29	Loss	(Thailand) Kwanphichit 13RianExpress	Rajadamnern Stadium	Bangkok, Thailand	Decision	5	3:00
2007-02-05	Loss	(Thailand) Thahanek Tor.Silachai	Onesongchai, Rajadamnern Stadium	Bangkok, Thailand	Decision	5	3:00
2006-11-18	Win	(Thailand) Kwangthong Sor.Thanatawan	Onesongchai, Rajadamnern Stadium	Bangkok, Thailand	Decision	5	3:00
2006-09-27	Win	(Thailand) Wanmainoi Decharat	Phettongkam, Rajadamnern Stadium	Bangkok, Thailand	Decision	5	3:00
2006-07-28	Loss	(Thailand) Detnarong Sitjaboon	Khunsuk Trakunyang, Lumpinee Stadium	Bangkok, Thailand	Decision	5	3:00
2006-07-02	Loss	(Thailand) Detnarong Sitjaboon		Bangkok, Thailand	Decision	5	3:00
2006-04-20	Win	(Thailand) Khantiphong Tor.Pitakkankan	Onesongchai, Rajadamnern Stadium	Bangkok, Thailand	TKO	4	
2006-03-27	Win	(Thailand) Phaenfah Sor.Damrongrit	Onesongchai, Rajadamnern Stadium	Bangkok, Thailand	KO	2	
2006-02-16	Loss	(Thailand) Rungrat Naratrikul	Onesongchai, Rajadamnern Stadium	Bangkok, Thailand	Decision	5	3:00
2005-12-22	Win	(Thailand) Thongchai Tor.Silachai	Onesongchai, Rajadamnern Stadium	Bangkok, Thailand	Decision	5	3:00
2005-09-01	Win	(Thailand) Thapnar Sitromsai	Onesongchai, Rajadamnern Stadium	Bangkok, Thailand	Decision	5	3:00
2005-08-08	Win	(Thailand) Chatchainoi Sitbenjama	Onesongchai, Rajadamnern Stadium	Bangkok, Thailand	Decision	5	3:00
2005-03-14	Win	(Thailand) Mafai Wor.Butwilai	Onesongchai, Rajadamnern Stadium	Bangkok, Thailand	Decision	5	3:00
2004-09-02	Win	(Thailand) Phaendin Sor.Damrongrit	Onesongchai, Rajadamnern Stadium	Bangkok, Thailand	KO	4	
2004-05-21	Win	(Thailand) Phonlertnoi 13RianTower	Por.Pramuk, Lumpinee Stadium	Bangkok, Thailand	Decision	5	3:00
Legend: Win Loss Draw/No contest Notes

== Professional boxing record ==
47 fights	38 wins	9 losses
By knockout	29	6
By decision	9	3

No.	Result	Record	Opponent	Type	Round, time	Date	Location	Notes
47	Loss	38–9	Shuri Oka	KO	3 (8), 1:16	19 Aug 2025	Korakuen Hall, Tokyo, Japan	
46	Loss	38–8	Yuya Tanaka	UD	8	11 May 2025	Ota City General Gymnasium, Tokyo, Japan	
45	Loss	38–7	Reymart Tagacanao	KO	8 (12), 1:37	21 Dec 2024	Holy Name University Gymnasium, Tagbilaran, Philippines	For WBA Asia super flyweight title
44	Loss	38–6	Masataka Taniguchi	KO	6 (8), 1:58	13 Oct 2024	Yokohama Budokan, Yokohama, Japan	
43	Win	38–5	Sophom Banyaem	TKO	3 (8), 1:15	4 Aug 2024	Municipality of Muangkhong, Rasisalai, Si Sa Ket, Thailand	
42	Loss	37–5	Kantaro Juri	UD	8	7 Jul 2024	Kokugikan, Tokyo, Japan	
41	Win	37–4	Weerasak Chuwatana	TKO	1 (6), 1:45	5 May 2024	Municipality of Muangkhong, Rasisalai, Si Sa Ket, Thailand	
40	Win	36–4	Udomsak Srinuan	UD	6	24 Mar 2024	Wat Banhong, Uthumpornpisai, Si Sa Ket, Thailand	
39	Loss	35–4	Reymart Gaballo	KO	1 (10), 0:35	13 Feb 2024	Midas Hotel and Casino, Pasay, Philippines	For WBO Oriental bantamweight title
38	Win	35–3	Akkhaphon Ngamkaeo	TKO	1 (6), 2:48	25 Nov 2023	Wat Pak Bo School, Bangkok, Thailand	
37	Loss	34–3	Ryuto Owan	TKO	4 (8), 1:40	13 Oct 2023	Korakuen Hall, Tokyo, Japan	
36	Loss	34–2	Wira Mikham	UD	8	27 Aug 2023	Thammasat Khlong Luang Withayakhom School, Pathum Thani, Thailand	
35	Win	34–1	Aekkalak Sangjinda	TKO	2 (6), 2:34	7 Jul 2023	Thammasat Khlong Luang Withayakhom School, Pathum Thani, Thailand	
34	Win	33–1	Anocha Phuangkaew	UD	6	7 Jun 2023	Meenayothin Camp, Bangkok, Thailand	
33	Loss	32–1	Jesse Espinas	TKO	8 (12)	26 Feb 2016	Wat Kokkuod, Surin, Thailand	Lost WBO Oriental light flyweight title
32	Win	32–0	Oscar Raknafa	RTD	8 (12), 3:00	20 Nov 2015	Wat Dongpikul, Suphan Buri, Thailand	Retained PABA light flyweight title
31	Win	31–0	Jopher Marayan	RTD	2 (12), 3:00	3 Oct 2015	Ban Rai Temple, Nakhon Ratchasima, Thailand	Retained PABA light flyweight title
30	Win	30–0	Fanther Ndahiuw	KO	1 (12), 1:45	28 Aug 2015	Onefan Stadium, Bangkok, Thailand	Retained WBO Oriental light flyweight title
29	Win	29–0	Stevanus Nana Bau	KO	2 (12), 2:35	12 May 2015	11th Inf Reg, Bangkok, Thailand	
28	Win	28–0	Lionel Legada	TKO	3 (12), 1:50	13 Feb 2015	SBAC University, Nonthaburi, Thailand	Retained WBO Oriental light flyweight title
27	Win	27–0	Mateo Handig	UD	12	4 Oct 2014	Ban Rai Temple, Nakhon Ratchasima, Thailand	Retained PABA light flyweight title
26	Win	26–0	Ellias Nggenggo	UD	12	12 Sep 2014	Bang Phli Yai, Thailand	Won vacant PABA light flyweight title
25	Win	25–0	Bobby Concepcion	KO	3 (12), 1:28	10 Jul 2014	Pak Kret Pier, Pak Kret, Thailand	Retained WBO Oriental light flyweight title
24	Win	24–0	Jayar Estremos	TKO	4 (12), 2:56	8 May 2014	Wat Punoi, Ban Mi, Thailand	Won vacant WBO Oriental light flyweight title
23	Win	23–0	Johan Wahyudi	TKO	2 (6), 1:55	14 Mar 2014	Wat Khaolangpattana, Lopburi, Thailand	
22	Win	22–0	Heri Amol	RTD	2 (6), 3:00	23 Dec 2013	Chaleena Hotel, Bangkok, Thailand	
21	Win	21–0	Roque Lauro	UD	12	26 Nov 2012	Nong Khai, Thailand	
20	Win	20–0	Xinghua Wang	UD	12	13 Sep 2012	MBK Center, Bangkok, Thailand	Won vacant WBC Asian Continental flyweight title
19	Win	19–0	Jesús Silvestre	UD	12	7 Nov 2011	Nong Khai, Thailand	Won vacant WBA interim minimumweight title
18	Win	18–0	Jack Amisa	TKO	1 (12), 2:16	16 Sep 2011	Ban Mi Sports Center, Lopburi, Thailand	Retained PABA minimumweight title
17	Win	17–0	Samuel Tehuayo	KO	3 (12), 1:53	11 Aug 2011	Pathumthani University, Pathum Thani, Thailand	Retained PABA minimumweight title
16	Win	16–0	Rino Ukru	KO	4 (12), 2:39	10 Jun 2011	Bannongyai School, Thep Sathit, Thailand	Retained PABA minimumweight title
15	Win	15–0	Mating Kilakil	KO	1 (12), 2:48	11 Apr 2011	Pone Kingpetch Memorial Park, Hua Hin, Thailand	Retained PABA minimumweight title
14	Win	14–0	Rey Loreto	KO	2 (12), 1:25	11 Mar 2011	Pak Klong Village Office, Pathio, Thailand	Retained PABA minimumweight title
13	Win	13–0	Nelson Llanos	KO	5 (12), 2:16	14 Jan 2011	Uthairiki Resort, Uthai, Thailand	Retained PABA minimumweight title
12	Win	12–0	Johan Wahyudi	TKO	4 (6), 2:07	23 Dec 2010	Don Sak, Thailand	
11	Win	11–0	Domi Nenokeba	TKO	1 (12), 1:19	14 Nov 2010	Phimai, Thailand	Won vacant PABA minimumweight title
10	Win	10–0	Jiang Tao	TKO	1 (12), 2:18	8 Oct 2010	Khlong Luang, Thailand	Retained PABA light flyweight title
9	Win	9–0	Safwan Lombok	TKO	2 (6), 2:03	10 Sep 2010	Chiang Yuen, Thailand	
8	Win	8–0	Erick Diaz Siregar	RTD	4 (12), 3:00	13 Aug 2010	Pathum Thani, Thailand	Won vacant PABA light flyweight title; Retained WBO Asia Pacific light flyweight title
7	Win	7–0	Ryan Maliteg	TKO	2 (12), 1:30	13 Jun 2010	Aranyaprathet, Thailand	Won vacant WBO Asia Pacific light flyweight title
6	Win	6–0	Ical Tobida	TKO	2 (12), 2:36	23 Apr 2010	Bang Bo, Thailand	
5	Win	5–0	Michael Rodriguez	UD	6	26 Mar 2010	Karama Beach, Phuket, Thailand	
4	Win	4–0	Roemart Sentillas	RTD	8 (12), 3:00	23 Feb 2010	Chai Nat Bird Park, Chai Nat, Thailand	
3	Win	3–0	Donny Mabao	KO	5 (11)	25 Dec 2009	Bangplama School, Suphan Buri, Thailand	
2	Win	2–0	Rey Megrino	KO	4 (11)	9 Oct 2009	Thaksin University, Songkhla, Thailand	Won PABA flyweight title
1	Win	1–0	Banlue Sawangwong	PTS	6	7 Aug 2002	Dan Khun Thot, Thailand	

Achievements
Vacant Title last held by Juan Palacios	WBA minimumweight champion Interim title November 7, 2011 – May 10, 2012; Stripped	Vacant Title next held by Jesús Silvestre
