= Norasing Lukbanyai =

Thai Muay Thai kickboxer

- Born: Jirawat Noomak จิระวัฒน์ หนูมาก; August 3, 1986 (age 40); Thung Wa District, Satun province, Thailand
- Native name: นรสิงห์ ลูกบ้านใหญ่
- Other names: Norasing Kokietgym (Boxing); Norasing SpecialeGym (ノラシン・スペチアーレジム) (Kickboxing)
- Nationality: Thai
- Height: 1.63 m (5 ft 4 in)
- Weight: 53 kg (117 lb; 8.3 st)
- Style: Muay Thai
- Stance: Orthodox
- Fighting out of: Bangkok, Thailand
- Team: Lukbanyai

Professional boxing record
- Total: 23
- Wins: 22
- By knockout: 15
- Draws: 1

Kickboxing record
- Total: 203
- Wins: 151
- By knockout: 20
- Losses: 52

Other information
- Boxing record from BoxRec

Norasing Lukbanyai (Thai: นรสิงห์ ลูกบ้านใหญ่, born August 3, 1986), also known as Jirawat Noomak (Thai: จิระวัฒน์ หนูมาก), is a Thai Muay Thai fighter and boxer.

== Biography and career ==
Norasing started Muay Thai at the age of 7.

In 2006 Norasing went undefeated, scoring multiple knockouts and winning the Lumpinee Stadium Light Flyweight title. He was elected Fighter of the Year by major institutions.
In June 2009 Norasing regained the Lumpinee Stadium Flyweight title by knocking out Phetmorakot Teeded99 in the first round. The same month he beat the AJKF champion Nobuchika Terado by technical knockout in the second round.

In 2011 Norasing made the transition to western boxing and won multiple regional titles in the following years. Due to a lack of opportunities at the world level in boxing Norasing attempted a Muay Thai comeback in 2017. He then focused on being a trainer at first at Evolve MMA in Singapore and in 2020 he settled in Nagoya, Japan where he started competing in kickboxing rules. He fought Genji Umeno at RISE Eldorado 2021. He lost the fight by unanimous decision.

== Titles and accomplishments ==
=== Muay Thai ===
- Lumpinee Stadium
  - 2006 Lumpinee Stadium Light Flyweight (108 lbs) Champion
  - 2006 Lumpinee Stadium Fighter of the Year
  - 2007 Lumpinee Stadium Flyweight (112 lbs) Champion
  - 2009 Lumpinee Stadium Flyweight (112 lbs) Champion
- OneSongchai
  - S-1 Light Flyweight (108 lbs) Champion
- Professional Boxing Association of Thailand (PAT)
  - 2x Thailand Flyweight (112 lbs) Champion (2007, 2009)
- Muaylok
  - 2010 Yodmuay Champions Cup 51 kg Champion

Awards

- 2006 Sports Authority of Thailand Fighter of the Year
- 2006 Siam Kela Fighter of the Year

=== Boxing ===
- Pan Asian Boxing Association
  - 2012 PABA Super Flyweight Champion (three defenses)
- Asian Boxing Council
  - 2014 ABCO Silver Super Flyweight Champion (defended once)

== Fight record ==
Muay Thai record
Date	Result	Opponent	Event	Location	Method	Round	Time
2024-06-20	Win	(Japan) Takeru Owaki	Suk Wanchai MuayThai Super Fight	Nagoya, Japan	Decision (Majority)	5	3:00
2023-07-23	Loss	(Japan) Kouta Uemura	HOOST CUP KINGS KYOTO 11	Kyoto, Japan	KO (Spinning back kick)	2	1:38
2022-05-07	Loss	(Japan) Ryota Naito	HEAT 50	Nagoya, Japan	Decision (Unanimous)	3	3:00
2021-10-17	Win	(Japan) Kazuhito	HEAT 49	Nagoya, Japan	KO	2	2:17
2021-05-23	Loss	(Japan) Kazuma	RISE 149	Tokyo, Japan	KO (Front Kick)	1	0:47
2021-02-28	Loss	(Japan) Genji Umeno	RISE Eldorado 2021	Yokohama, Japan	Decision (Unanimous)	3	3:00
2017-06-09	Loss	(Thailand) Yodmondam FighterMuaythai	True4U, Rangsit Stadium	Rangsit, Thailand	TKO (Doctor Stoppage)	3	
2014-06-10	Loss	(Thailand) Saksit Lukjaomaesaitong	Lumpinee Stadium	Bangkok, Thailand	Decision	5	3:00
2010-11-14	Win	(Thailand) Nattaphon Nacheukvittayakom		Nakhon Ratchasima, Thailand	KO	1	
2010-09-29	Loss	(Thailand) Nopachai Kiatpattharaphan	Rajadamnern Stadium	Bangkok, Thailand	Decision	5	3:00
2010-08-01	Win	(Thailand) Chanchai Sor.Thanayong	MUAY 2010 ～Muaylokー Grand Stage Yodmuay Champions Cup, Final	Tokyo, Japan	Decision (Split)	5	3:00
Wins Muaylok Champions Cup -51kg title.
2010-06-04	Loss	(Thailand) Pornsawan Lukprabat	Lumpinee Stadium	Bangkok, Thailand	Decision	5	3:00
Loses Thailand 112 lbs title.
2010-04-25	Win	(Thailand) Yodthongthai Por.Telakun	MUAY 2010 2nd Muaylok ー Yodmuay Champions Cup, Semi Final	Tokyo, Japan	KO (Left Hook)	3	2:43
2010-03-05	Loss	(Thailand) Palangpon Chuwattana	Lumpinee Stadium	Bangkok, Thailand	Decision	5	3:00
2009-12-24	Win	(Thailand) Pornsawan Lukprabat	Rajadamnern Stadium	Bangkok, Thailand	Decision	5	3:00
2009-11-18	Win	(Thailand) Thanuphet Looknongphai	Rajadamnern Stadium	Bangkok, Thailand	KO	2	
2009-09-04	Loss	(Thailand) Kritthongkam Tor.Surachet	Lumpinee Stadium	Bangkok, Thailand	Decision	5	3:00
Loses the Lumpinee Stadium 112 lbs title.
2009-07-03	Loss	(Thailand) Palangpon Piriyanoppachai	Lumpinee Stadium	Bangkok, Thailand	TKO	4	
2009-06-21	Win	(Japan) Nobuchika Terado	AJKF Norainu Dengekisakusen	Tokyo, Japan	TKO (3 Knockdowns)	2	1:12
2009-06-05	Win	(Thailand) Phetmorakot Teeded99	Lumpinee Stadium	Bangkok, Thailand	KO (Left Hook)	1	
Wins the vacant Lumpinee Stadium 112 lbs title.
2009-03-24	Win	(Thailand) Khunponjiew Saengsawang	Lumpinee Stadium	Bangkok, Thailand	Decision	5	3:00
2009-02-13	Loss	(Thailand) Wanchailek Kiatphukham	Lumpinee Stadium	Bangkok, Thailand	Decision	5	3:00
2009-01-16	Win	(Thailand) Thianchai Kor.Saphaothong	Petchyindee, Lumpinee Stadium	Bangkok, Thailand	KO	2	
2008-12-02	Win	(Thailand) Somboonbaeb Sor.Phumphanumuang	Lumpinee Stadium	Bangkok, Thailand	KO	5	
2008-10-24	Loss	(Thailand) Chatpichit Sor.Pornchai	Lumpinee Stadium	Bangkok, Thailand	Decision	5	3:00
2008-09-19	Win	(Thailand) Apidej Sor.Sommai	Lumpinee Stadium	Bangkok, Thailand	Decision	5	3:00
2008-02-08	Win	(Thailand) Somboonbaeb Sor.Phumphanumuang	Lumpinee Stadium	Bangkok, Thailand	KO	3	
2007-12-07	Loss	(Thailand) Pongsiri Por.Siripong	Lumpinee Stadium 51st Anniversary	Bangkok, Thailand	Decision	5	3:00
For the vacant Lumpinee Stadium 112 lbs title.
2007-10-16	Win	(Thailand) Somboonbaeb Sor.Phumphanumuang	Lumpinee Stadium	Bangkok, Thailand	Decision	5	3:00
2007-07-20	Loss	(Thailand) Komphichai Rifloniasawna	Lumpinee Stadium	Bangkok, Thailand	Decision	5	3:00
2007-06-08	Loss	(Thailand) Lertphet Por Worasing	Lumpinee Stadium	Bangkok, Thailand	Decision	5	3:00
2007-04-03	Loss	(Thailand) Chatchai Sor.Thanayong	Lumpinee Stadium	Bangkok, Thailand	Decision	5	3:00
Loses the Lumpinee Stadium 112 lbs title.
2007-03-02	Win	(Thailand) Somboonbaeb Sor.Phumphanumuang	Lumpinee Stadium	Bangkok, Thailand	Decision	5	3:00
Wins the Lumpinee Stadium 112 lbs title.
2007-01-30	Loss	(Thailand) Panomroonglek Kitamuu9	Lumpinee Stadium	Bangkok, Thailand	Decision	5	3:00
2006-12-08	Win	(Thailand) Chatchai Sor.Thanayong	Lumpinee Stadium 50th Anniversary	Bangkok, Thailand	Decision	5	3:00
2006-10-27	Win	(Thailand) Nakrobdam Por.Burapha	Lumpinee Stadium	Bangkok, Thailand	Decision	5	3:00
2006-08-29	Win	(Thailand) Wanheng Menayothin	Lumpinee Stadium	Bangkok, Thailand	Decision	5	3:00
2006-07-14	Win	(Thailand) Fahmai FA.Group	Lumpinee Stadium	Bangkok, Thailand	KO	1	
2006-06-02	Win	(Thailand) Hualamphong Fonjangchonburi	Lumpinee Stadium	Bangkok, Thailand	KO	1	
Wins Lumpinee Stadium 108 lbs title.
2006-05-08	Win	(Thailand) Palangpon Piriyanopchai	Rajadamnern Stadium	Bangkok, Thailand	KO	1	
2006-03-28	Win	(Thailand) Khaimookdam Pomkwanarong	Lumpinee Stadium	Bangkok, Thailand	Decision	5	3:00
2006-02-24	Win	(Thailand) Fasang Pitakchai	Lumpinee Stadium	Bangkok, Thailand	KO	2	
2006-01-	Win	(Thailand) Yodkeng Jockygym	Lumpinee Stadium	Bangkok, Thailand	KO		
2005-12-22	Win	(Thailand) Luknimit Singklongsi	Rajadamnern Stadium	Bangkok, Thailand	Decision	5	3:00
2005-10-21	Loss	(Thailand) Lertphet Sor Tawanrung	Rajadamnern Stadium	Bangkok, Thailand	Decision	5	3:00
2005-08-29	Win	(Thailand) Linglom Tor.Chalermchai	Rajadamnern Stadium	Bangkok, Thailand	Decision	5	3:00
2005-07-28	Win	(Thailand) Chalermphon Petchsupan	Lumpinee Stadium	Bangkok, Thailand	Decision	5	3:00
2005-06-24	Loss	(Thailand) Luknimit Singklongsi	Lumpinee Stadium	Bangkok, Thailand	Decision	5	3:00
2005-04-19	Loss	(Thailand) Inseekaw Rachanon	Lumpinee Stadium	Bangkok, Thailand	Decision	5	3:00
2005-02-11	Win	(Thailand) Nuengthep Eminentair	Lumpinee Stadium	Bangkok, Thailand	Decision	5	3:00
2004-11-26	Loss	(Thailand) Pornmongkol Sakhiranchai	Lumpinee Stadium	Bangkok, Thailand	Decision	5	3:00
2004-09-27	Loss	(Thailand) Taplang Toyotarayong	Rajadamnern Stadium	Bangkok, Thailand	Decision	5	3:00
2004-08-10	Loss	(Thailand) Mahachoke Kiatphatphan	Lumpinee Stadium	Bangkok, Thailand	Decision	5	3:00
2004-06-04	Loss	(Thailand) Boonmee Sor Daranee	Lumpinee Stadium	Bangkok, Thailand	Decision	5	3:00
2003-10-03	Win	(Thailand) Yuttahat 96Peenang	Praianan, Lumpinee Stadium	Bangkok, Thailand	Decision	5	3:00
Legend: Win Loss Draw/No contest Notes
