= Rungruanglek Lukprabat =

Thai former professional Muay Thai fighter

- Born: Preecha Wongsa; January 29, 1986 (age 40); Phra Phutthabat, Saraburi, Thailand
- Native name: ปรีชา วงษ์ศา
- Other names: เหลี่ยมเข่าอัจฉริยะ
- Nickname: Angled Knee of the Holy Foot (เหลี่ยมเข่าพระบาท)
- Height: 170 cm (5 ft 7 in)
- Division: Super Flyweight; Bantamweight
- Style: Muay Thai (Muay Khao)
- Stance: Orthodox
- Team: Lukprabat

Preecha Wongsa (Thai: ปรีชา วงษ์ศา; born January 29, 1986), known professionally as Rungruanglek Lukprabat (Thai: รุ่งเรืองเล็ก ลูกพระบาท), is a Thai former professional Muay Thai fighter. He is a former Lumpinee Stadium Bantamweight Champion as well as the 2009 Sports Writers Association of Thailand Fighter of the Year who was active during the 2000s and 2010s.

== Biography and career ==
In 2007 Rungruanglek participated to the annual Isuzu Cup happening at Omnoi Stadium, he was part of the 16 fighters carefully selected for the anniversary of the Isuzu brand. Rungruanglek went undefeated during the group phase and won the Cup defeating Manasak Narupai in the final on June 7, 2008.

== Titles and accomplishments ==
- Lumpinee Stadium
  - 2009 Lumpinee Stadium Bantamweight (118 lbs) Champion
- Omnoi Stadium
  - 2008 Omnoi Stadium Bantamweight (118 lbs) Champion
- Isuzu Cup
  - 2008 Isuzu Cup Bantamweight (118 lbs) Tournament Winner
- Professional Boxing Association of Thailand (PAT)
  - 2006 Thailand Super Flyweight (115 lbs) Champion
  - ???? Thailand Bantamweight (118 lbs) Champion
- World Combat Games
  - 2013 World Combat Games Muay Thai -54 kg (gold)
- International Federation of Muaythai Associations
  - 2012 IFMA World Championships -54 kg (gold)
  - 2014 IFMA World Championships -54 kg (gold)

Awards

- 2009 Sports Writers Association of Thailand Fighter of the Year

== Fight record ==
Muay Thai Record
| Date | Result | Opponent | Event | Location | Method | Round | Time |
|---|---|---|---|---|---|---|---|
| 2012-01-12 | Loss | (Thailand) Sam-A Gaiyanghadao | Rajadamnern Stadium | Bangkok, Thailand | Decision | 5 | 3:00 |
| 2011-12-07 | Win | (Thailand) Rungphet Wor Rungniran | | Thailand | Decision | 5 | 3:00 |
| 2011-09-22 | Loss | (Thailand) Rungphet Wor Rungniran | Rajadamnern Stadium | Bangkok, Thailand | Decision | 5 | 3:00 |
| 2011-08-30 | Loss | (Thailand) Sam-A Gaiyanghadao | Lumpinee Stadium | Bangkok, Thailand | Decision | 5 | 3:00 |
| 2011-05-10 | Loss | (Thailand) Tong Puideenaidee | Lumpinee Stadium | Bangkok, Thailand | Decision | 5 | 3:00 |
For the Thailand Super Bantamweight (122 lbs) title.
| 2011-03-31 | Win | (Thailand) Saeksan Or. Kwanmuang | Rajadamnern Stadium | Bangkok, Thailand | Decision | 5 | 3:00 |
| 2011-02-02 | Draw | (Thailand) Tong Puideenaidee | Rajadamnern Stadium | Bangkok, Thailand | Decision | 5 | 3:00 |
| 2010-12-29 | Win | (Thailand) Sam-A Gaiyanghadao | Rajadamnern Stadium | Bangkok, Thailand | Decision | 5 | 3:00 |
| 2010-10-05 | Loss | (Thailand) Sam-A Gaiyanghadao | Lumpinee Stadium | Bangkok, Thailand | Decision | 5 | 3:00 |
| 2010-06-10 | Win | (Thailand) Pettawee Sor Kittichai | Rajadamnern Stadium | Bangkok, Thailand | Decision | 5 | 3:00 |
| 2010-05-07 | Draw | (Thailand) Pettawee Sor Kittichai | Lumpinee Stadium | Bangkok, Thailand | Decision | 5 | 3:00 |
| 2010-02-23 | Win | (Thailand) Prab Gaiyanghadao | Lumpinee Stadium | Bangkok, Thailand | Decision | 5 | 3:00 |
| 2010-01-08 | Win | (Thailand) Lekkla Thanasuranakorn | Lumpinee Stadium | Bangkok, Thailand | Decision | 5 | 3:00 |
| 2009-12-08 | Win | (Thailand) Rungphet Wor.Sangprapai | Lumpinee Stadium | Bangkok, Thailand | Decision | 5 | 3:00 |
Wins the vacant Lumpinee Stadium Bantamweight (118 lbs) title.
| 2009-11-13 | Win | (Thailand) Sam-A Gaiyanghadao | Lumpinee Stadium | Bangkok, Thailand | Decision | 5 | 3:00 |
| 2009-09-29 | Win | (Thailand) Chatchainoi Sor Prasopchok | Lumpinee Stadium | Bangkok, Thailand | Decision | 5 | 3:00 |
| 2009-09-04 | Win | (Thailand) Rungphet Wor.Sangprapai | Lumpinee Stadium | Bangkok, Thailand | Decision | 5 | 3:00 |
| 2009-08-06 | Loss | (Thailand) Pakorn Sakyothin | Rajadamnern Stadium | Bangkok, Thailand | Decision | 5 | 3:00 |
| 2009-07-03 | Win | (Thailand) Khaimookdam Sit-O | Lumpinee Stadium | Bangkok, Thailand | Decision | 5 | 3:00 |
| 2009-04-03 | Loss | (Thailand) Pornsanae Sitmonchai | Lumpinee Stadium | Bangkok, Thailand | TKO | 2 | |
| 2009-03-03 | Win | (Thailand) Sam-A Gaiyanghadao | Lumpinee Stadium | Bangkok, Thailand | Decision | 5 | 3:00 |
| 2009-01-27 | Win | (Thailand) Nongbeer Choknamwong | Lumpinee Stadium | Bangkok, Thailand | Decision | 5 | 3:00 |
| 2008-12-08 | Win | (Thailand) Wanchalerm Sitsornong | Lumpinee Stadium | Bangkok, Thailand | Decision | 5 | 3:00 |
| 2008-09-04 | Loss | (Thailand) Sam-A Gaiyanghadao | Rajadamnern Stadium | Bangkok, Thailand | KO | 4 | |
| 2008-06-07 | Win | (Thailand) Manasak Pinsinchai | Omnoi Stadium - Isuzu Cup Final | Bangkok, Thailand | Decision | 5 | 3:00 |
Wins the Isuzu Cup Bantamweight (118 lbs) Tournament and Omnoi Stadium Bantamweight (118 lbs) title.
| 2008-05-17 | Win | (Thailand) Songkom Wor.Sangprapai | Omnoi Stadium - Isuzu Cup Semi Final | Bangkok, Thailand | Decision | 5 | 3:00 |
| 2008-03-22 | Win | (Thailand) Manasak Pinsinchai | Omnoi Stadium - Isuzu Cup | Bangkok, Thailand | Decision | 5 | 3:00 |
| 2008-01-19 | Win | (Thailand) Ole Kor KittisakGym | Omnoi Stadium - Isuzu Cup | Bangkok, Thailand | Decision | 5 | 3:00 |
| 2007-11-24 | Win | (Thailand) Kangwalek Petchyindee | Omnoi Stadium - Isuzu Cup | Bangkok, Thailand | Decision | 5 | 3:00 |
| 2007-07-06 | Win | (Thailand) Duangpichit Ajarn Siriporn | Petchyindee + Jor Por Ror 7, Lumpinee Stadium | Bangkok, Thailand | Decision | 5 | 3:00 |
| 2007-05-04 | Win | (Thailand) Rakkiat Kiatpraphat | Petchpiya, Lumpinee Stadium | Bangkok, Thailand | Decision | 5 | 3:00 |
| 2007-02-13 | Win | (Thailand) Detsuriya Sitthiprasert | Petchpiya, Lumpinee Stadium | Bangkok, Thailand | Decision | 5 | 3:00 |
| 2006-12-08 | Loss | (Thailand) Detnarong Sitjaboon | Lumpinee Stadium 50th Anniversary | Bangkok, Thailand | Decision | 5 | 3:00 |
For the Lumpinee Stadium Super Flyweight (115 lbs) title.
| 2006-10-24 | Loss | (Thailand) Kompichit Rifloniasauna | Petchyindee, Lumpinee Stadium | Bangkok, Thailand | Decision | 5 | 3:00 |
| 2006-08-18 | Win | (Thailand) Kangwanlek Petchyindee | Petchyindee, Lumpinee Stadium | Bangkok, Thailand | Decision | 5 | 3:00 |
| 2006-07-14 | Win | (Thailand) Kangwanlek Petchyindee | Jor Por Ror 7 + Phetpiya Fights, Lumpinee Stadium | Bangkok, Thailand | Decision | 5 | 3:00 |
| 2006-04-21 | Win | (Thailand) Duangpichit Siriporn | Wanbunya, Lumpinee Stadium | Bangkok, Thailand | Decision | 5 | 3:00 |
| 2006-01-24 | Win | (Thailand) Sam-A Gaiyanghadao | Phetpiya Fights, Lumpinee Stadium | Bangkok, Thailand | Decision | 5 | 3:00 |
| 2005-11-03 | Loss | (Thailand) Fahmechai F.A. Group | Rajadamnern Stadium | Bangkok, Thailand | Decision | 5 | 3:00 |
| 2005-10-06 | Win | (Thailand) Thongchai Tor.Silachai | Rajadamnern Stadium | Bangkok, Thailand | Decision | 5 | 3:00 |
| 2005-07-26 | Win | (Thailand) Phayasuea Sor.Hengcharoen | Lumpinee Stadium | Bangkok, Thailand | Decision | 5 | 3:00 |
| 2005-06-09 | Win | (Thailand) Kwanpichit 13CoinsExpress | Rajadamnern Stadium | Bangkok, Thailand | Decision | 5 | 3:00 |
| 2005-02-28 | Loss | (Thailand) Songkom Wor.Sangprapai | Rajadamnern Stadium | Bangkok, Thailand | Decision | 5 | 3:00 |
| 2005-01-25 | Win | (Thailand) Mongkolchai Petchsupan | Lumpinee Stadium | Bangkok, Thailand | Decision | 5 | 3:00 |
| 2004-12-09 | Loss | (Thailand) Wannar Kaennorasing | Rajadamnern Stadium | Bangkok, Thailand | Decision | 5 | 3:00 |
| 2004-10-04 | Loss | (Thailand) Pornsanae Sitmonchai | Rajadamnern Stadium | Bangkok, Thailand | Decision | 5 | 3:00 |
| 2004-09-16 | Win | (Thailand) Aikpracha Meenayothin | Wansongchai Fights, Rajadamnern Stadium | Bangkok, Thailand | Decision | 5 | 3:00 |
| 2004-08-20 | Win | (Thailand) Rittichak Kaewsamrit | Petchsuphan, Lumpinee Stadium | Bangkok, Thailand | Decision | 5 | 3:00 |
| 2004-07-13 | Loss | (Thailand) Chatchainoi Sitbenjama | Petchsuphapan, Lumpinee Stadium | Bangkok, Thailand | Decision | 5 | 3:00 |
| 2004-06-03 | Win | (Thailand) Aikpracha Meenayothin | Onesongchai, Rajadamnern Stadium | Bangkok, Thailand | Decision | 5 | 3:00 |
| 2004-04-21 | Loss | (Thailand) Petch Banagsaen | Lumpinee Stadium | Bangkok, Thailand | Decision | 5 | 3:00 |
| 2003-12-28 | Win | (Thailand) Taweechai Singklongski | Onesongchai, Rajadamnern Stadium | Bangkok, Thailand | Decision | 5 | 3:00 |
| 2003-08-28 | Loss | (Thailand) Chatchainoi Sitbenjama | Onesongchai, Lumpinee Stadium | Bangkok, Thailand | Decision | 5 | 3:00 |
| 2003-07-27 | Loss | (Thailand) Chatchainoi Sitbenjama | Onesongchai, Lumpinee Stadium | Bangkok, Thailand | Decision | 5 | 3:00 |
| 2003-05-03 | Win | (Thailand) Rungrit Sitsomlong | | Bangkok, Thailand | Decision | 5 | 3:00 |
| ? | Win | (Thailand) Panomroonglek Kiatmoo9 | Lumpinee Stadium | Bangkok, Thailand | KO | | |
| 2000-12-30 | Win | (Thailand) Panomroonglek Kiatmoo9 | Omnoi Stadium | Samut Sakhon, Thailand | Decision | 5 | 3:00 |
Legend: Win Loss Draw/No contest Notes

Amateur Muay Thai Record
| Date | Result | Opponent | Event | Location | Method | Round | Time |
|---|---|---|---|---|---|---|---|
| 2014-05- | Win | (Uzbekistan) Jakhangir Yuldashev | 2014 IFMA World Championships, Final | Langkaw, Malaysia | Decision | | |
Wins 2014 IFMA World Championships -54kg Gold Medal.
| 2014-05- | Win | (Ukraine) Vladyslav Mykytas | 2014 IFMA World Championships, Semi Final | Langkaw, Malaysia | Decision | | |
| 2014-05- | Win | (Kazakhstan) Ilyas Mussim | 2014 IFMA World Championships, Quarter Final | Langkaw, Malaysia | Decision | | |
| 2014-05- | Win | (Malaysia) Muhammad Qhalid | 2014 IFMA World Championships, 1/8 Final | Langkaw, Malaysia | Decision | | |
| 2013-10-23 | Win | (Russia) Arslan Bagunov | 2013 World Combat Games, Final | Bangkok, Thailand | Decision | | |
Wins 2013 World Combat Games Muay Thai -54kg Gold Medal.
| 2013-10-21 | Win | | 2013 World Combat Games, Semi Final | Bangkok, Thailand | Decision | | |
| 2012-09-13 | Win | (Belarus) Andrei Zayats | 2012 IFMA World Championships, Final | Saint Petersburg, Russia | | | |
Wins 2012 IFMA World Championships -54kg Gold Medal.
| 2012-09-11 | Win | (Russia) Gavrilov Daniil Gennadievich | 2012 IFMA World Championships, Semi Finals | Saint Petersburg, Russia | | | |
| 2012-09-09 | Win | (Sweden) Hoang Giang | 2012 IFMA World Championships, Quarter Finals | Saint Petersburg, Russia | | | |
Legend: Win Loss Draw/No contest Notes
