= Khaimookdam Sit-O =

Thai Muay Thai fighter

- Born: November 10, 1986 (age 39); Phlapphla Chai district, Buriram province, Thailand
- Other names: Kaimukdam Ekbangsai (ไข่มุกดำ เอกบางไทร); Khaimookdam Pomkhwannarong (ไข่มุกดำ ป้อมขวัญณรงค์); Khaimukdam Chuwattana (ไข่มุกดำ ชูวัฒนะ); Khaimookdam Luksamrong (ไข่มุกดำ ลูกสำโรง)
- Height: 165 cm (5 ft 5 in)
- Division: Flyweight; Super Flyweight; Bantamweight; Super Bantamweight
- Style: Muay Khao
- Stance: Orthodox
- Fighting out of: Buriram province, Thailand
- Team: Sit-O
- Trainer: Thaweesak Sit-O

Banlue Ramprakon (Thai: บันลือ รัมย์ประโคน), known professionally as Khaimookdam Sit-O (Thai: ไข่มุกดำ ศิษย์โอ) is a Thai former Muay Thai fighter.

== Biography and career ==
Banlue Ramprakon was born in Parkonchai, Buriram province, Thailand. He started training in Muya Thai at the age of ten under the guidance of his father before joining the Sit-O camp at the age of fifteen.

On July 10, 2008, Khaimookdam lost his Rajadamnern Stadium 115 lbs title to Pakorn Sakyothin by decision.

On February 11, 2009, Khaimookdam faced Chatchainoi GardenSeaview at the Rajadamnern Stadium for the Onesongchai promotion. He won the fight by decision.

Khaimookdam faced Chatchainoi Sitbenjama for the third time at the Rajadamnern Stadium on May 7, 2009. He won the fight by fourth-round technical knockout after hurting his arm.

On May 10, 2011, Khaimookdam rematched Kaotam Lookprabaht at the Lumpinee Stadium for the Petchyindee promotion. He lost the fight by decision.

On November 4, 2011, Khaimookdam faced Kunitaka at a WBC Muay Thai event in Bangkok for the inaugural WBC Muay Thai World Super Bantamweight title. He won the fight by unanimous decision.

On June 24, 2012, Khaimookdam travelled to Japan to face Heichachi Nakajima at NJKF KICK TO THE FUTURE 4. He won the fight by unanimous decision.

On February 17, 2013, Khaimookdam made the first defense of his Rajadamnern Stadium Super Bantamweight title agasint Kunitaka at NJKF 2013 1st in Tokyo, Japan. He won the fight by technical knockout in the second round after three knockdowns.

He is currently a trainer at Aphichat Muay Thai.

== Titles and accomplishments ==
- Rajadamnern Stadium
  - 2008 Rajadamnern Stadium Super Flyweight (115 lbs) Champion
  - 2012 Rajadamnern Stadium Super Bantamweight (122 lbs) Champion
    - One successful title defense
- World Boxing Council Muay Thai
  - 2011 WBC Muay Thai World Super Bantamweight (122 lbs) Champion
    - One successful title defense

== Fight record ==
Muay Thai Record
Date	Result	Opponent	Event	Location	Method	Round	Time
2013-02-17	Win	(Japan) Kunitaka	NJKF 2013 1st	Tokyo, Japan	TKO (3 Knockdowns)	2	1:44
Defends the Rajadamnern Stadium Super Bantamweight (122 lbs) title.
2012-11-20	Win	(Thailand) Kaotam Lookprabaht	Lumpinee Stadium	Bangkok, Thailand	Decision	5	3:00
2012-10-12	Win	(Thailand) Ratket Teedet99	EminentAir, Lumpinee Stadium	Bangkok, Thailand	KO	4	
2012-08-09	Win	(Thailand) Manasak Pinsinchai	Daorung Chujaroen, Rajadamnern Stadium	Bangkok, Thailand	Decision	5	3:00
2012-05-18	Loss	(Thailand) Dechasakda Sitsongpeenong	Petchyindee, Lumpinee Stadium	Bangkok, Thailand	Decision	5	3:00
2012-06-24	Win	(Japan) Heihachi Nakajima	NJKF KICK TO THE FUTURE 4	Osaka, Japan	Decision (Unanimous)	5	3:00
2012-02-29	Win	(Thailand) Manasak Pinsinchai	Daorung Chujaroen, Rajadamnern Stadium	Bangkok, Thailand	Decision	5	3:00
2012-01-25	Win	(Thailand) Methawin Kiatyongyut	WBC Muay Thai, Nimbutr Stadium	Bangkok, Thailand	Decision (Unanimous)	5	3:00
Defends the WBC Muay Thai World Super Bantamweight (122 lbs) title and wins the vacant Rajadamnern Stadium Super Bantamweight (122 lbs) title.
2011-12-04	Loss	(Thailand) Manasak Narupai	Aswindam, Ladprao Stadium	Bangkok, Thailand	Decision	5	3:00
2011-11-04	Win	(Japan) Kunitaka	WBC Muay Thai, Nimbutr Stadium	Bangkok, Thailand	Decision (Unanimous)	5	3:00
Wins the inaugural WBC Muay Thai World Super Bantamweight (122 lbs) title.
2011-08-04	Win	(Thailand) Phetdam Sitboonmee	Sor.Sommai, Rajadamnern Stadium	Bangkok, Thailand	Decision	5	3:00
2011-07-14	Win	(Thailand) Sirimongkol P.K.Stereo	Daorung Chujaroen, Rajadamnern Stadium	Bangkok, Thailand	Decision	5	3:00
2011-05-10	Loss	(Thailand) Kaotam Lookprabaht	Petchyindee, Lumpinee Stadium	Bangkok, Thailand	Decision	5	3:00
2011-03-31	Win	(Thailand) Kaotam Lookprabaht	Rajadamnern United Fight + Lumpinee Tsunami Relief, Rajadamnern Stadium	Bangkok, Thailand	Decision	5	3:00
2011-02-23	Draw	(Thailand) Palangthip Nor.Sriphueng	Jarumuang, Rajadamnern Stadium	Bangkok, Thailand	Decision	5	3:00
2011-01-31	Win	(Thailand) Khomphichit Sor.Kor.Siripong	Daorung Chujaroen, Rajadamnern Stadium	Bangkok, Thailand	Decision	5	3:00
2010-12-25	Loss	(Thailand) Luknimit Singklongsi	Omnoi Stadium	Samut Sakhon, Thailand	Decision	5	3:00
2010-10-23	Loss	(Thailand) Prab Kaiyanghadaogym	Omnoi Stadium	Samut Sakhon, Thailand	Decision	5	3:00
2010-09-18	Win	(Thailand) Saen Parunchai	Omnoi Stadium	Samut Sakhon, Thailand	TKO	4	
2010-07-03	Win	(Thailand) Manasak Narupai	Omnoi Stadium	Samut Sakhon, Thailand	TKO	4	
2010-	Win	(Thailand) Prab Kaiyanghadaogym	Omnoi Stadium	Samut Sakhon, Thailand	Decision	5	3:00
2010-02-25	Loss	(Thailand) Phudpadnoi Muangseema	Sor.Wanchat, Rajadamnern Stadium	Bangkok, Thailand	Decision	5	3:00
2009-11-26	Loss	(Thailand) Phudpadnoi Muangseema	Onesongchai, Rajadamnern Stadium	Bangkok, Thailand	Decision	5	3:00
2009-09-17	Loss	(Thailand) Dechsuriya Sitthiprasert	Onesongchai, Rajadamnern Stadium	Bangkok, Thailand	Decision	5	3:00
2009-07-03	Loss	(Thailand) Rungruanglek Lukprabat	Lumpinee Stadium	Bangkok, Thailand	Decision	5	3:00
2009-06-08	Loss	(Thailand) Pettawee Sor Kittichai	Onesongchai, Rajadamnern Stadium	Bangkok, Thailand	Decision	5	3:00
2009-05-07	Win	(Thailand) Chatchainoi GardenSeaview	Onesongchai, Rajadamnern Stadium	Bangkok, Thailand	TKO (arm injury)	4	
2009-03-12	Loss	(Thailand) Chatchainoi GardenSeaview	Onesongchai, Rajadamnern Stadium	Bangkok, Thailand	Decision	5	3:00
2009-02-11	Win	(Thailand) Chatchainoi GardenSeaview	Phettongkam + Onesongchai, Rajadamnern Stadium	Bangkok, Thailand	Decision	5	3:00
2008-12-27	Win	(Thailand) Visanlek Sor.Tosapon	Omnoi Stadium	Samut Sakhon, Thailand	Decision	5	3:00
2008-11-29	Win	(Thailand) Hualamphong N&PBoxing	Onesongchai	Buriram province, Thailand	Decision	5	3:00
2008-08-07	Loss	(Thailand) Pakorn Sakyothin	Onesongchai, Rajadamnern Stadium	Bangkok, Thailand	TKO (High kick)	5	
2008-07-10	Loss	(Thailand) Pakorn Sakyothin	Onesongchai, Rajadamnern Stadium	Bangkok, Thailand	Decision	5	3:00
Loses the Rajadamnern Stadium Super Flyweight (115 lbs) title.
2008-06-19	Win	(Thailand) Daoden Singkhlongsi	Onesongchai, Rajadamnern Stadium	Bangkok, Thailand	Decision	5	3:00
Wins the vacant Rajadamnern Stadium Super Flyweight (115 lbs) title.
2008-04-10	Win	(Thailand) Pornsanae Sitmonchai	Onesongchai, Rajadamnern Stadium	Bangkok, Thailand	KO (High kick)	3	
2008-03-20	Loss	(Thailand) Rittijak Kaewsamrit	Onesongchai, Rajadamnern Stadium	Bangkok, Thailand	Decision	5	3:00
2008-02-07	Win	(Thailand) Luknimit Singklongsi	Rajadamnern Stadium	Bangkok, Thailand	Decision	5	3:00
2007-12-19	Loss	(Thailand) Thongchai Tor.Silachai	Phettongkam, Rajadamnern Stadium	Bangkok, Thailand	Decision	5	3:00
2007-11-12	Win	(Thailand) Thongchai Tor.Silachai	Onesongchai, Rajadamnern Stadium	Bangkok, Thailand	Decision	5	3:00
2007-04-25	Win	(Thailand) Thongthaeng Muangsima	Chonburi, Rajadamnern Stadium	Bangkok, Thailand	Decision	5	3:00
2007-03-26	Win	(Thailand) Konbannoi Sit Namkhon	Onesongchai, Rajadamnern Stadium	Bangkok, Thailand	Decision	5	3:00
2007-01-22	Loss	(Thailand) Kwanpichit 13CoinsExpress	Onesongchai, Rajadamnern Stadium	Bangkok, Thailand	Decision	5	3:00
2006-12-25	Win	(Thailand) Samson Por.Jongcharoen	Onesongchai, Rajadamnern Stadium	Bangkok, Thailand	KO	4	
2006-11-02	Loss	(Thailand) Hanchai Kiatyongyut	Kiatyongyut, Rajadamnern Stadium	Bangkok, Thailand	Decision	5	3:00
2006-07-20	Loss	(Thailand) Luknimit Singklongsi	Rajadamnern Stadium	Bangkok, Thailand	Decision	5	3:00
2006-06-01	Win	(Thailand) Phayaknum Sitniwat	Onesongchai, Rajadamnern Stadium	Bangkok, Thailand	Decision	5	3:00
2006-04-20	Win	(Thailand) Petchdam Sitboonmee	Onesongchai, Rajadamnern Stadium	Bangkok, Thailand	Decision	5	3:00
2006-03-28	Loss	(Thailand) Norasing Lukbanyai	Lumpinee Stadium	Bangkok, Thailand	Decision	5	3:00
2006-03-06	Win	(Thailand) Luknimit Singklongsi	Rajadamnern Stadium	Bangkok, Thailand	Decision	5	3:00
2005-12-22	Loss	(Thailand) Wanheng Menayothin	Rajadamnern Stadium Anniversary	Bangkok, Thailand	Decision	5	3:00
2005-10-20	Win	(Thailand) Yodphichit EminentAir	Onesongchai, Rajadamnern Stadium	Bangkok, Thailand	Decision	5	3:00
2005-08-08	Draw	(Thailand) Wanheng Menayothin	Onesongchai, Rajadamnern Stadium	Bangkok, Thailand	Decision	5	3:00
2005-07-06	Draw	(Thailand) Yodprabsuk Por.Kumpai	Onesongchai, Rajadamnern Stadium	Bangkok, Thailand	Decision	5	3:00
2005-05-03	Loss	(Thailand) Wangchomphu Chor.Rattanachai	Onesongchai, Rajadamnern Stadium	Bangkok, Thailand	Decision	5	3:00
2005-03-07	Win	(Thailand) Super Aor.Chiangkhan	Onesongchai, Rajadamnern Stadium	Bangkok, Thailand	Decision	5	3:00
2005-01-20	Win	(Thailand) TeeUS Kor.Kiattinan	Onesongchai, Rajadamnern Stadium	Bangkok, Thailand	KO	3	
2004-06-07	Win	(Thailand) Superblack Lukekarin	Onesongchai, Rajadamnern Stadium	Bangkok, Thailand	Decision	5	3:00
2004-	Win	(Thailand) Santisuk Nongkeepayut	Rajadamnern Stadium	Bangkok, Thailand	TKO	4	
2004-	Win	(Thailand) TeeUS Kor.Kiattinan	Rajadamnern Stadium	Bangkok, Thailand	TKO	3	
2004-	Win	(Thailand) Superbenz Aor.Chiangkhan	Rajadamnern Stadium	Bangkok, Thailand	Decision	5	3:00
2004-	Win	(Thailand) Singsod Wor.Rattana	Rajadamnern Stadium	Bangkok, Thailand	Decision	5	3:00
2003-	Win	(Thailand) Aiduk 13RianExpress	Rajadamnern Stadium	Bangkok, Thailand	Decision	5	3:00
2003-	Win	(Thailand) Nongrak KimbuaPetroleum	Omnoi Stadium	Samut Sakhon, Thailand	Decision	5	3:00
2003-	Win	(Thailand) Phanomthuanlek Amsuanmali	Omnoi Stadium	Samut Sakhon, Thailand	Decision	5	3:00
Legend: Win Loss Draw/No contest Notes
