= Pich Sambath =

Kun Khmer fighter and kickboxer

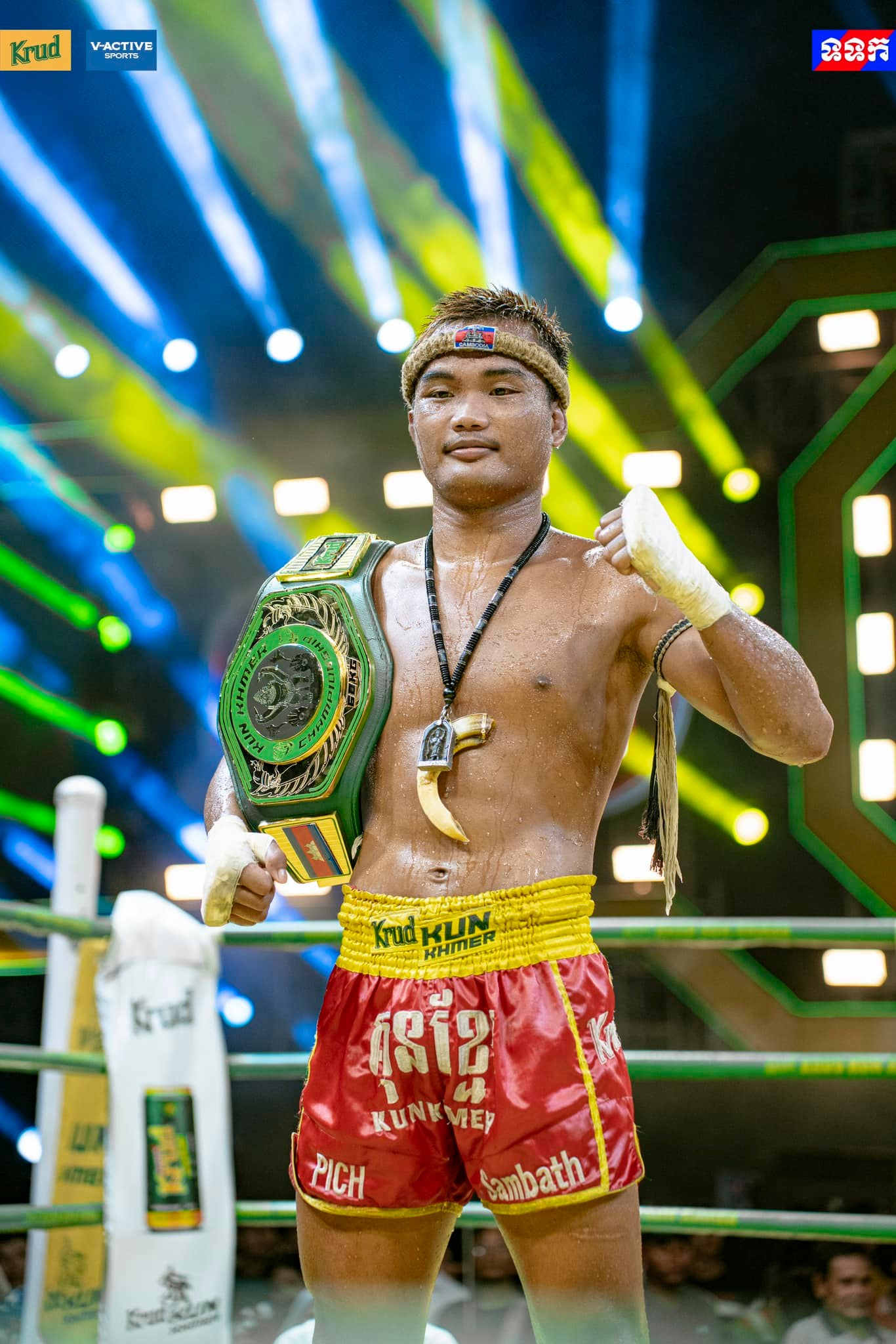
- Pich Sambath won a Krud Kun Khmer Champion 60Kg Title Belt After defeating Ncedo Gomba at TVK on November 16, 2024.
- Born: Phoeun Sambath; April 14, 2002 (age 24); Barsedth, Kampong Speu, Cambodia
- Native name: ពេជ្រ សម្បត្តិ ភឿន សម្បត្តិ
- Nickname: Wild buffalo Krobei Prey (ក្របីព្រៃ)
- Nationality: Khmer
- Height: 1.65 m (5 ft 5 in)
- Weight: 60 kg (132 lb; 9 st 6 lb)
- Style: Kun Khmer
- Team: Pich Sophann Kun Khmer Gym
- Trainer: Pich Sophann
- Years active: 2020 - present

Kickboxing record
- Total: 129
- Wins: 111
- By knockout: 71
- Losses: 12
- Draws: 6

Pich Sambath (Khmer: ពេជ្រ សម្បត្តិ), also known as Phoeun Sambath (ភឿន សម្បត្តិ; born April 14, 2002), is a professional Kun Khmer fighter and kickboxer from Cambodia. The Kampuchea Thmey Daily listed him in the top 10 Kun Khmer boxers of early 2023 and 2024. Sambath was listed as a top 5 Kun Khmer fighter at 60 kg in 2025 by CSB Sport. He is known for his punches, striking power and endurance. He competes in the 57 kg-60 kg weight category.

== Biography ==
Sambath was born on April 8, 2002, in Kandoul village, Kampong Speu province, Cambodia to a family of farmers. He is the oldest of four children. His sisters are Phoeun Sambo and Phoeun Vann Lean, and his brother is Phoeun Vansing. Vansing is also involved in Kun Khmer training.

Sambath's father, Vong Mil, is a construction foreman, while his mother, Aun Sok Khim, works in farming. Sambath dropped out of school after completing the seventh grade.

Sambath began Kun Khmer as a method of improving his family's economic situation. He began training in Khmer boxing in 2019 but stopped to pursue other employment opportunities. In 2020, he resumed his training at the Pich Sophann Kun Khmer Gym under guidance from Pich Sophann, a famous kick boxer.

Sambath is known by the moniker "Krabei Prey Moktann" (Khmer language: ក្របីព្រៃមុខតាន់), which translates to "Wild Buffalo Solid Face." He has established himself as a professional Kun Khmer boxer.

== Career ==
=== Kun Khmer ===
Sambath first fought on February 20, 2021, at Kun Khmer International Marathon in a friendly match against Toem Savuth. The match consisted of 5 rounds, each being 3 minutes long. Sambath loss by split decision.

Sambath fought Chhut Serey Vannthong in a MAS fight, a nine-minute round where knockout is required to win. The match ended in a draw.

Sambath was listed in Kampuchea Thmey Daily's top 10 list of Khmer boxers for the first half of 2023. Sambath did not make the national team, though he did win the Carabao championship at the end of 2022 and the 2023 International Krud belt.

On August 22, 2023, Sambath won a fight against Saw Kolo, a Lethwei fighter from Myanmar, at the Kun Khmer All Star Event . He won a car, sponsored by Boostrong, after winning the popular best fighters vote from fans of the event.

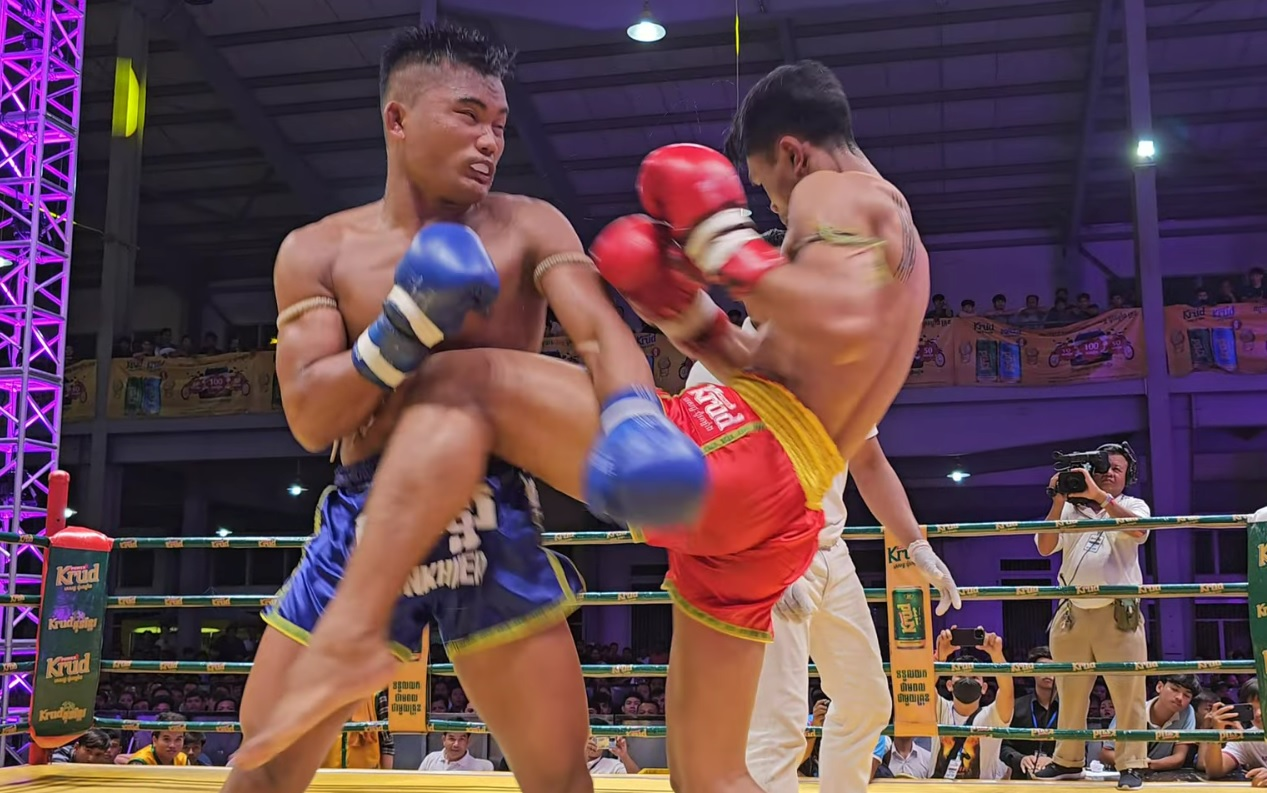
Pich Sambath (left) fighting Cambodian fighter Khim Bora (right) in a championship match.

Sambath won the Krud Kun Khmer champion 2023 belt by winning against Khim Bora. He received a US$1,889 prize from the organisers on 3 September 2023, through a split decision from the judges.

In early 2024, Sambath broke multiple fighting records. In January, Sambath became Kun Khmer National Champion after winning against Morn Sameth. In March, he won a championship, beating French opponent Florent Lewis Joseph. In April, he won another Dragon Kun Khmer Top 5 Belt Tournament against Japanese and Russian opponents in a main event Khmer Maha Sangrant (Khmer New Year 2024) at Kampong Cham town, Cambodia. In May, he won a Krud Belt against Thun Vanna, a student of Thun Sophea, in a Belt-to-Belt bet event by split decision 4:1 at the TVK arena.

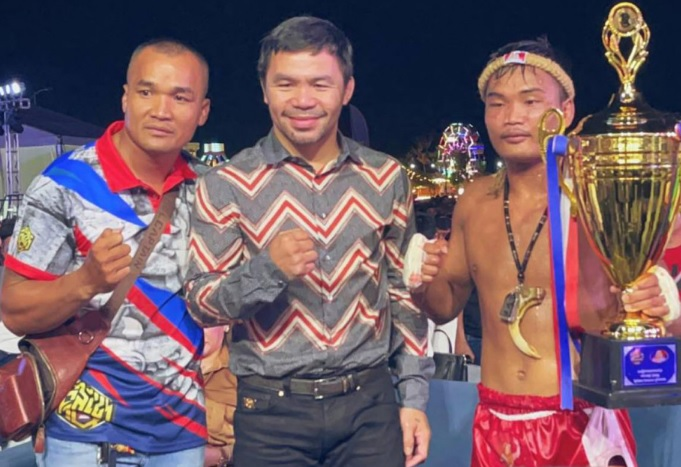
Coach Pich Sophann, Manny Pacquiao, and Pich Sambath.

On August 4, in a Kun Khmer/modified Japanese kickboxing match at Knock Out 2024 volume 3, held in Bunkyo, Tokyo, Japan, Sambath dominated over Reiya Komor. Sambath won in round three, with a decisive right hook at 0:53 causing a total knockout. The match concluded with Sambath's victory in a total fight time of 6:53.

On September 5, 2024, Sambath fought against Mehrdad Khanzadeh. The first round ended with a knockout victory for Sambath. He won the overall match.

On September 14, 2024, in the main event of Xtreme Cambodia Kun Khmer Hang Meas HD TV, Rin Devid failed to defeat Sambath. Sambath won 12,000,000 Riels and an Extreme Gold Belt from the Hang Meas Kun Khmer Arena. Before an upcoming National Champion match, on September 29, 2024, Sambath lost his Krud Kun Khmer belt to South African Ncedo Gomba. TVK prepared a belt champion rematch between Sambath and Gomba on November 16, 2024, which Sambath won. This earned him 8,000,000 Riels and the Krud Kun Khmer Belt.

Sambath fought Sok Thy on June 28, 2025, in a five-round title fight organized by Hang Meas TV. In July 2025, CSB Sport listed Sambath within the top 5 Kun Khmer fighter at 60 kg, alongside Chhut Serey Vannthong, Khim Bora, Sok Thy, and Beut Sangkhum.

Sambath competed in China at the EM Legend Kun Khmer fighting championship on October 7, 2025, where he competed against Carlos Tszhin. Before this match, Tszhin's won the WMC Belt in a match against Chou Wei Jian. Tszhin held belts from the WMC, WBC and IPCC. Other Cambodian athletes scheduled to compete in the event include Lao Chetra, Moeun Sokhuch, Pich Athitep and Eh Yanut.

Lorn Panha, Bert Sangkham, Pich Sambath, Pich Atithep, and Keng Sieng Hay will visit France to compete in an event as a team on February 28, 2026.

A team of Pich Sambath, Beut Sangkhum, Moeun Sokhuch, Pich Singha and Kham Neakreach will travel to South Korea to compete in a Khmer martial arts event on Sunday, March 22, 2026. The event is a collaborating between Bayon TV station, the Khmer Boxing Federation and the Ministry of Labor and Vocational Training.

=== Kickboxing ===
In an international friendly match between Cambodia and China on January 19, 2024, Sambath defeated his Yang Zhuo by split decision under kickboxing rules, in 3 rounds.

On May 14, 2024, Sambath defeated Wang Zunyang from China by full decision under the 3 round K1 kickboxing rules. The match took place in Phnom Penh, Cambodia.

== Titles and accomplishments ==
- Carabao Session
  - 2022 Carabao Session 8 Champion
- Krud Kun Khmer
  - 2022 Krud Kun Khmer 60 kg Champion
    - Three successful title defenses
  - 2024 Krud Kun Khmer 60 kg Champion
- Xtreme Cambodia Kun Khmer
  - 2024 Xtreme Cambodia Kun Khmer 60 kg Champion
  - 2025 Xtreme Cambodia Kun Khmer 60 kg Champion
- World Kun Khmer
  - 2026 World Kun Khmer 8-man Tournament Winner
- Kun Khmer National Federation
  - 2023 Kun Khmer National Championship 60 kg Champion
  - 2024 Kun Khmer National Championship 60 kg Champion
- Kun Khmer International Federation
  - 2026 Kun Khmer International Federation World 60 kg Champion

== Fight record ==
Professional Kun Khmer and Kickboxing record
112 wins (72 (T)KOs), 12 losses, 6 draws
Date	Result	Opponent	Event	Location	Method	Round	Time
November 8, 2026	Win	(China) Li Yunlong	Ganzberg Kun Khmer x Knock Out	Cambodia	KO (punches)	1	1:20
October 18, 2026	Win	(Tunisia) Ragheb Dkhili	Fight Clubbing 44	Siem Reap, Cambodia	TKO (referee stoppage)	2	2:15
September 26, 2026	Win	(South Africa) Simon Masera	Ganzberg Kun Khmer Kombat Season 2	Cambodia	TKO (referee stoppage)	2	0:45
September 19, 2026	Win	(Myanmar) Aung Myo Oo	Boostrong Super Kun Khmer	Tboung Khmum district, Cambodia	KO (right cross)	1	
September 5, 2026	Win	(Ecuador) Victor Felip	Cambodia Beer Kun Khmer	Phnom Penh, Cambodia	KO (Left hook to the body)	2	
August 22, 2026	Win	(China) Wang Xianjing	Xtreme Cambodia Kun Khmer	Phnom Penh, Cambodia	KO (punch to the body)	1	2:30
August 7, 2026	Win	(Vietnam) Đặng Y bon	Kubota Kun Khmer	Phnom Penh, Cambodia	Decision	3	3:00
July 17, 2026	Win	(Australia) Phonlakit Chompram	Cambodia Kun Khmer – Best of the Best in Australia	Sydney, Australia	TKO	2	0:50
Wins the Kun Khmer International Federation World 60 Kg title.
July 5, 2026	Win	(Kyrgyzstan) Ali Khan	Ganzberg Kun Khmer	Cambodia	TKO (Referee stoppage)	3	
June 14, 2026	Win	(Cambodia) Thun Menghong	TVK: THE BATTLE OF 3 KINGDOMS x KRUD KUN KHMER	Cambodia	Decision	5	
May 30, 2026	Win	(Uzbekistan) Dadamurod Raimov	Krud Kun Khmer	Phnom Penh, Cambodia	TKO (retirement)	2	
May 17, 2026	Win	(Ivory Coast) Mohamed Dembélé	Krud Kun Khmer	Phnom Penh, Cambodia	Decision	5	3:00
Defends the Krud Kun Khmer 60Kg title.
April 26, 2026	Win	(Mongolia) B. Amgalanbayar	Town Boxing	Phnom Penh, Cambodia	KO	3	1:08
March 22, 2026	Win	(Japan) Kaito Suzuki	Ganzberg Kun Khmer	Hwaseong, South Korea	TKO (Punches)	2	1:00
March 1, 2026	Win	(France) Maxime Combes	Cambodia Kun Khmer	Paris, France	KO (Jumping elbow)	2	
February 8, 2026	Win	(Turkey) Menan Sihanlioglu	Krud Kun Khmer	Phnom Penh, Cambodia	TKO (Punches)	1	2:00
January 20, 2026	Win	(Mongolia) B. Amgalanbayar	Ganzberg World Kun Khmer 2026 - 8 Man Tournament, Final	Phnom Penh, Cambodia	Decision	3	3:00
Wins World Kun Khmer 60Kg Tournament title.
January 20, 2026	Win	(Russia) Artur Budagyan	Ganzberg World Kun Khmer 2026 - 8 Man Tournament, Semifinals	Phnom Penh, Cambodia	Decision	3	3:00
January 20, 2026	Win	(China) Huang Jinrui	Ganzberg World Kun Khmer 2026 - 8 Man Tournament, Quarterfinals	Phnom Penh, Cambodia	Decision	3	3:00
January 10, 2026	Win	(China) Jiang Ronglong	Wurkz Kun Khmer	Phnom Penh, Cambodia	KO (Right hook)	2	0:20
December 6, 2025	Win	(Iran) Javad Mohammad	Ganzberg Super Kun Khmer	Phnom Penh, Cambodia	TKO (3 Knockdowns)	1	
November 22, 2025	Win	(Republic of Ireland) Aaron Clarke	Xtreme Cambodia Kun Khmer	Phnom Penh, Cambodia	Decision (Unanimous)	5	3:00
Wins the vacant Xtreme Cambodia Kun Khmer 60Kg title.
November 2, 2025	Win	(China) Qi Chao	TV5 Cambodia	Phnom Penh, Cambodia	KO	1	1:05
October 7, 2025	Win	(China) Su Zixuan	EM Legend 50	Qionglai, China	Decision	3	3:00
September 20, 2025	Win	(Iran) Ali Khabar	Nara Kun Khmer	Phnom Penh, Cambodia	KO (Elbow)	2	
September 6, 2025	Win	(Spain) Camilo Rodrigues	CTN Arena	Phnom Penh, Cambodia	KO (Punches)	3	
August 23, 2025	Win	(Iran) Daniel Mohammadi	Bayon TV Boxing	Phnom Penh, Cambodia	KO (Punches)	1	2:42
July 13, 2025	Win	(South Africa) Ncedo Gomba	Krud Kun Khmer	Phnom Penh, Cambodia	KO (Left hook to the body)	3	
June 28, 2025	Loss	(Cambodia) Sok Thy	Xtreme Cambodia Kun Khmer	Phnom Penh, Cambodia	Decision	5	3:00
Loses the Xtreme Cambodia Kun Khmer 60Kg title.
June 14, 2025	Win	(Kyrgyzstan) Sherzod Kabutov	Camel Kun Khmer	Cambodia	Decision	3	3:00
May 31, 2025	Win	(United States) Malcolm Hill	Krud Kun Khmer to USA 2	Tacoma, Washington, USA	Decision (Unanimous)	5	3:00
Wins the USECA International 60Kg title.
May 14, 2025	Win	(Spain) Mario Álvarez	Ganzberg Kun Khmer	Phnom Penh, Cambodia	KO (Uppercut)	2	
May 3, 2025	Win	(Malaysia) Boy Prata	Kun Khmer	Cambodia	KO	2	
April 13, 2025	Win	(Mexico) Edgar Tabares	WCK Muay Thai x Krud Kun Khmer	Long Beach, California, USA	KO (Left hook)	2	1:46
March 29, 2025	Win	(Iran) Parsa Aminipour	Top Camel Warriors - Kun Khmer	Cambodia	KO (Body kick)	2	
March 15, 2025	Win	(Australia) Josh McCulloch	Xtreme Cambodia Kun Khmer	Phnom Penh, Cambodia	Decision	5	5:00
March 7, 2025	Win	(Iran) Yashar Yazdani	Kubota Kun Khmer	Phnom Penh, Cambodia	KO (Punches)	2	
February 16, 2025	Win	(Thailand) Jomphon Sor.Klinmee	Krud Kun Khmer	Phnom Penh, Cambodia	Decision	3	3:00
January 11, 2025	Win	(Iran) Hesam Ghaedrahmati	Kun Khmer	Phnom Penh, Cambodia	TKO	2	
December 30, 2024	Loss	(Japan) Taimu Hisai	K.O CLIMAX 2024 - Red Championship Tournament, Semifinals	Yokohama, Japan	TKO (Punches and knee)	3	1:04
December 15, 2024	Win	(Iran) Mayad Aminy	Krud Kun Khmer	Kampot Province, Cambodia	KO (Left hook to the body)	1	
November 30, 2024	Win	(France) Daren Rolland	Xtreme Cambodia Kun Khmer	Phnom Penh, Cambodia	TKO (3 Knockdowns/punches)	2	1:00
November 16, 2024	Win	(South Africa) Ncedo Gomba	Krud Kun Khmer TVK	Phnom Penh, Cambodia	TKO (Right elbow)	2	0:30
Wins the Krud Kun Khmer 60Kg title.
October 26, 2024	Win	(Thailand) Yodrachan Kiatnavy	Cambodia Kun Khmer Bayon and BTV Sport Arena	Phnom Penh, Cambodia	Decision (Unanimous)	3	3:00
October 12, 2024	Win	(Thailand) Tum Kitti Patkam	Krud Kun Khmer TVK	Phnom Penh, Cambodia	Decision (Split)	3	3:00
September 29, 2024	Loss	(South Africa) Ncedo Gomba	Krud Kun Khmer TVK	Phnom Penh, Cambodia	Decision (Split)	3	3:00
Loses the Krud Kun Khmer 60kg title.
September 14, 2024	Win	(Cambodia) Rin Devid	Xtreme Kun Khmer	Phnom Penh, Cambodia	KO (Right punch)	1	2:42
Wins Super Fold Xtreme Cambodia Kun Khmer 60 kg title.
September 5, 2024	Win	(Iran) Mehrdad Khanzadeh	Hanuman KUN KHMER	Phnom Penh, Cambodia	KO (Right punch)	1	2:35
August 31, 2024	Win	(Thailand) Slatan Jitmuangnon	XTREME CAMBODIA KUN KHMER	Phnom Penh, Cambodia	KO (Right Elbow)	1	1:51
August 17, 2024	Win	(Thailand) Wutthidet Tded99	Boostrong Kun Khmer BTV Arena	Phnom Penh, Cambodia	TKO	2	2:24
August 4, 2024	Win	(Japan) Reiya Komori	Knock Out 2024 vol.3	Tokyo, Japan	KO (Right cross)	3	0:53
July 21, 2024	Win	(China) Qubiluohua	Kun Khmer Super Strike PNN Arena	Phnom Penh, Cambodia	TKO	1	1:02
July 13, 2024	Win	(Malaysia) Umar Red Wolves	Cambodia Kun Khmer International friendly match BTV Arena	Phnom Penh, Cambodia	Decision (Unanimous)	3	3:00
June 22, 2024	Win	(Thailand) Pornphyhak Susibakmikiev	Carabao Kun Khmer CTN Arena	Phnom Penh, Cambodia	TKO	1	2:42
June 16, 2024	Win	(Cambodia) Thun Vanna	Krud Kun Khmer: The Battle of Kings II	Serei Saophoan, Cambodia	Decision	3	3:00
May 31, 2024	Win	(France) Fabio Loisi	Hanuman Kun Khmer Arena BTV	Phnom Penh, Cambodia	Decision (Unanimous)	3	3:00
May 14, 2024	Win	(China) Wang Zunyang	Kickboxing K1 International Friendly Match, Kun Khmer Town Arena	Phnom Penh, Cambodia	Decision	3	3:00
May 5, 2024	Win	(Cambodia) Thun Vanna	Belt-To-Belt Krud Kun Khmer TVK Arena Town	Bovel, Battambang, Cambodia	Decision (Split)	5	3:00
Defends the Krud Kun Khmer 60kg title.
April 25, 2024	Win	(Japan) Taimu Hisai	Ganzberg Kun Khmer - Town Boxing	Phnom Penh, Cambodia	Decision (Unanimous)	3	3:00
April 14, 2024	Win	(Russia) Alexandr Glagolev	Dragon Kun Khmer Top 5 Town Arena	Kampong Cham, Cambodia	TKO	1	2:52
Wins the 2024 Dragon Kun Khmer title.
April 14, 2024	Win	(Japan) Yuto Ueno	Dragon Kun Khmer Top 5 Town Arena	Kampong Cham, Cambodia	TKO	2	2:08
March 28, 2024	Draw	(Thailand) Petlampun Muadablampang	Boostrong Kun Khmer BTV Arena	Svay Rieng, Cambodia	Decision Draw	3	3:00
March 9, 2024	Win	(Thailand) Nueng Oubunlek Tded99	Krud Kun Khmer TVK Boxing	Kampong Thom, Cambodia	TKO	3	0:50
March 1, 2024	Win	(France) Florent Louis Joseph	Idol Kun Khmer BTV Arena	Phnom Penh, Cambodia	Decision (unanimous)	3	3:00
Wins the 2024 KKF Kun Khmer Cup.
February 17, 2024	Win	(Thailand) Kamlaiyuk Suon Ahanpikmai	Carabao Kun Khmer Fight for 1 Millions Riels Prize CTN	Phnom Penh, Cambodia	unanimous decision	5	5:00
February 9, 2024	Win	(Thailand) Makralek Sitparang	Boostrong King of The Ring Kun Khmer	Phnom Penh, Cambodia	TKO	1	1:60
January 19, 2024	Win	(China) Yang Huo	Kickboxing International Friendly Match, Kun Khmer Kung Fu	Phnom Penh, Cambodia	Decision	3	3:00
January 13, 2024	Win	(Thailand) Yokmorrakot Sor Sangprapai	Mattrid Kun Khmer	Phnom Penh, Cambodia	TKO	2	1:35
January 7, 2024	Win	(Turkey) Emre Özmen	Ganzberg IDOL Kun Khmer	Phnom Penh, Cambodia	TKO	2	2:24
December 24, 2023	Win	(Thailand) Pepsichor Getweena	Wurkz Kun Khmer Warriors	Ratanakiri, Cambodia	TKO	2	2:00
December 14, 2023	Win	(Lebanon) Rahmoun Majd	Boostrong Kun Khmer	Phnom Penh, Cambodia	TKO	3	2:03
November 23, 2023	Win	(Ukraine) Sudniev Bohdan	Ganzberg Kun Khmer World Cup	Phnom Penh, Cambodia	Decision	3	3:00
November 5, 2023	Loss	(Thailand) Tum Sityodtong	Kun Khmer Super fight (Best of Best)	Melbourne, Australia	Decision	3	3:00
October 11, 2023	Win	(Malaysia) Elias Ghazali	Boostrong Kun Khmer	Phnom Penh, Cambodia	TKO	2	2:20
September 30, 2023	Win	(Brazil) Alex Sandro	Wurkz Kun Khmer MASFIGHT	Phnom Penh, Cambodia	TKO	1	5:50
September 17, 2023	Win	(Cambodia) Norng Sav	MASFIGHT Kun Khmer Cambodia	Phnom Penh, Cambodia	TKO	1	6:54
September 3, 2023	Win	(Cambodia) Khim Bora	Krud Kun Khmer Belt Challenge	Bovel, Battambang, Cambodia	Decision (Split)	5	3:00
Wins the Krud Kun Khmer 60kg title.
August 22, 2023	Win	(Myanmar) Saw Kolo	Kun Khmer All Star (KAS) EP 8	Phnom Penh, Cambodia	TKO	2	1:45
July 16, 2023	Win	(Thailand) Petchlampoon Porcharoenpat	TECHO SANTEPHEAP Kun Khmer World Champion	Phnom Penh, Cambodia	Decision	3	3:00
June 24, 2023	Win	(France) Faycal Bahroumi	Kun Khmer All Star (KAS) E.P 7	Paris, France	Decision	3	3:00
June 6, 2023	Win	(Iran) Sajjad Mohammadi	NNP Morodok Kun Khmer	Phnom Penh, Cambodia	Decision	3	3:00
March 14, 2023	Loss	(Laos) Lamnamkhong BS MuayThai	Mattrid Kun Khmer	Phnom Penh, Cambodia	TKO	3	1:22
February 27, 2023	Win	(Thailand) Seksan Chor.Thaiseth	Kun Khmer All Star (KAS) EP.6	Phnom Penh, Cambodia	Decision	3	3:00
February 11, 2023	Draw	(Cambodia) Chhut Serey Vannthong	Wurkz Kun Khmer Tournament	Svay Rieng, Cambodia	MASFIGHT Rules KO To Win	1	9:00
February 3, 2023	Win	(Thailand) Petchkarat Sityokpetch	Mattrid Kun Khmer Fighter	Phnom Penh, Cambodia	TKO	2	1.32
January 15, 2023	Win	(Thailand) PhetnamEk Sor.Sor.Pakorn	Carabao Kun Khmer	Phnom Penh, Cambodia	TKO	2	0:58
December 31, 2022	Win	(Cambodia) Thun Eanglai	Krud Kun Khmer Champion Belt	Tboung Khmum, Cambodia	Decision (Split)	5	3:00
Wins the Krud Kun Khmer 60kg title.
December 24, 2022	Win	(Thailand) Pecthnoi Blue Fight Club	Missile Power of Kun Khmer Fighter	Phnom Penh, Cambodia	TKO	2	2:55
December 13, 2022	Win	(Thailand) Naruto Santhian Muay Thai Gym	Kubota Grade A Fighter Champion	Phnom Penh, Cambodia	TKO	3	1:58
November 18, 2022	Win	(Thailand) Saensakngern Sitthorngklai	Kubota Grade A Fighter Champion	Phnom Penh, Cambodia	TKO	3	1:52
November 11, 2022	Win	(Thailand) Angali Sitjening	Mattrid Kun Khmer Fighter	Phnom Penh, Cambodia	TKO	3	1:56
October 23, 2022	Win	(Thailand) Pathana Sit Archanwin	Carabao Kun Khmer Champion Belt Final Round Session 8	Phnom Penh, Cambodia	Decision (Split)	5	3:00
Wins the 2022 Carabao Session 8 title.
October 2, 2022	Win	(Cambodia) Thun Phanith	Carabao Kun Khmer Champion Belt Session 8 Semi-Final Round	Phnom Penh, Cambodia	TKO	1	00:49
September 4, 2022	Win	(Thailand) Petchmetmai Sitnornglek	Carabao Kun Khmer Champion Belt Session 8 Round IV	Phnom Penh, Cambodia	TKO	2	2:50
August 14, 2022	Win	(Thailand) Pathana Sit Archanwin	Carabao Kun Khmer Champion Belt Sesion 8 Round III	Phnom Penh, Cambodia	Decision	5	3:00
July 24, 2022	Win	(Thailand) Rakthae Sit Ajarnbeer	Carabao Kun Khmer Champion Belt Sesion 8 Round II	Phnom Penh, Cambodia	TKO	2	1:13
July 3, 2022	Loss	(Thailand) TuanPe Chor.Chatchai	Carabao Kun Khmer Champion Belt Sesion 8 Round I	Phnom Penh, Cambodia	Decision (Split)	5	3:00
June 17, 2022	Loss	(Thailand) Pathana Sit Archanwin	Kubota Kun Khmer Grad A Fighter	Phnom Penh, Cambodia	Decision	5	5:00
June 11, 2022	Win	(Thailand) Tiliek Chhangbanratt	Missile Energy Kun Khmer Fighter	Phnom Penh, Cambodia	TKO	2	2:06
May 28, 2022	Win	(Thailand) Kamlaiyok Kor Rumsrithorng	Wurkz Kun Khmer	Phnom Penh, Cambodia	Decision	3	3:00
May 14, 2022	Win	(Thailand) TuanPe Chor.Chatchai	Wurkz Kun Khmer International Friendly Match	Phnom Penh, Cambodia	Decision	3	3:00
April 30, 2022	Draw	(Cambodia) Ban Lim (Cambodia) Em Rotha (Cambodia) San Sam Un	Wurkz Kun Khmer Tournament	Koh Kong, Cambodia	MASFIGHT Rules KO To Win	1	9:00
April 24, 2022	Win	(Thailand) Muangthong Santhian MuayThaiGym	Boostrong The Imperia of Kun Khmer	Phnom Penh, Cambodia	TKO	2	00:58
April 9, 2022	Loss	(Cambodia) Eh Naroth	Ek Phnom Arena Super Kun Khmer Fighter	Battambang, Cambodia	Decision	5	5:00
April 1, 2022	Win	(Thailand) Nattapoon Phorpheunruamsan	Kubota Kun Khmer Champion	Phnom Penh, Cambodia	Decision	5	5:00
March 27, 2022	Win	(Cambodia) Khon Seyha	Ganzberg One Strike	Phnom Penh, Cambodia	TKO	1	2:56
March 20, 2022	Draw	(Cambodia) Leap Rotha	MastFight Cambodia	Phnom Penh, Cambodia	MASFIGHT Rules KO To Win	1	9:00
March 10, 2022	Win	(Cambodia) Chin Chang	Missile Energy Kun Khmer Fighter	Phnom Penh, Cambodia	TKO	3	2:20
February 27, 2022	Win	(Cambodia) Phann Sophat	MASFIGHT Cambodia Kun Khmer	Phnom Penh, Cambodia	TKO	1	3:10
February 19, 2022	Win	(Cambodia) Sim Seyha	Wurkz Kun Khmer	Phnom Penh, Cambodia	TKO	2	1:42
February 6, 2022	Draw	(Cambodia) Ouch Thearith	MASFIGHT Cambodia	Phnom Penh, Cambodia	MASFIGHT Rules KO To Win	1	9:00
January 29, 2022	Win	(Cambodia) Khon Seyha	Missiles Energy Kun Khmer fighter	Phnom Penh, Cambodia	TKO	2	1:43
January 26, 2022	Win	(Cambodia) Eh Naroth	MASFIGHT Cambodia	Phnom Penh, Cambodia	TKO	1	3:00
January 8, 2022	Win	(Cambodia) Long Khet	Wurkz Kun Khmer National Friendly Match	Phnom Penh, Cambodia	Decision	5	5:00
December 29, 2021	Loss	(Cambodia) Norng Sav	Wurkz Kun Khmer	Phnom Penh, Cambodia	Decision	5	5:00
December 19, 2021	Win	(Cambodia) Soeun Thaisan	MASFIGHT Cambodia	Phnom Penh, Cambodia	TKO	1	2:50
December 4, 2021	Loss	(Cambodia) Tha Sarun	Champion Energy of Kun Khmer Fighter	Phnom Penh, Cambodia	Decision	3	3:00
November 22, 2021	Draw	(Cambodia) Sen Kosal	MASFIGHT Cambodia	Phnom Penh, Cambodia	MASFIGHT Rules KO To Win	1	9:00
October 24, 2021	Win	(Cambodia) Long Khet	MASFIGHT Cambodia	Phnom Penh, Cambodia	TKO	1	3:10
October 16, 2021	Win	(Cambodia) Mel Sarun	Wurkz National Friendly Kun Khmer	Phnom Penh, Cambodia	TKO	5	1:15
October 10, 2021	Win	(Cambodia) Em Phearun	MASFIGHT Cambodia	Phnom Penh, Cambodia	TKO	1	2:20
September 26, 2021	Win	(Cambodia) Khuon Lamcosin	MASFIGHT Cambodia	Phnom Penh, Cambodia	TKO	1	2:35
September 9, 2021	Loss	(Cambodia) Em Channy	Champion Energy Kun Khmer Fighter	Phnom Penh, Cambodia	Decision	5	5:00
September 4, 2021	Win	(Cambodia) Ra Rorng	Champion Energy Kun Khmer Fighter	Phnom Penh, Cambodia	TKO	3	1:54
August 29, 2021	Win	(Cambodia) Elite Long lei	MASFIGHT Cambodia	Phnom Penh, Cambodia	TKO	1	2:12
July 10, 2021	Win	(Cambodia) Soda Socheat	Champion Energy Kun Khmer Fighter	Phnom Penh, Cambodia	TKO	1	1:49
June 26, 2021	Win	(Cambodia) Em Rotha	Champion Energy Kun Khmer Fighter	Phnom Penh, Cambodia	TKO	2	1:30
June 6, 2021	Win	(Cambodia) Sarak Sophanun	Carabao Kun Khmer	Phnom Penh, Cambodia	Decision	5	5:00
May 16, 2021	Win	(Cambodia) Serey Theara	Carabao Kun Khmer	Phnom Penh, Cambodia	Decision	5	5:00
March 13, 2021	Win	(Cambodia) Pov Ling	Kun Khmer International Marathon Friendly Match	Phnom Penh, Cambodia	TKO	2	1:20
February 20, 2021	Loss	(Cambodia) Toem Phalvuth	Kun Khmer International Marathon Friendly Match	Phnom Penh, Cambodia	Decision	5	5:00
Legend: Win Loss Draw/no contest Notes

Amateur Kun Khmer record
Date	Result	Opponent	Event	Location	Method	Round	Time
November 6, 2024	Win	(Cambodia) Kan Meng Hong	Final 4th National Champion 2024	Phnom Penh, Cambodia	KO (Left punch)	1	1:14
Wins the 2024 Kun Khmer National Championship title.
November 5, 2024	Win	(Cambodia) Sith Rathen	4th National Champion 2024	Phnom Penh, Cambodia	Walkover	3	3:00
November 4, 2024	Win	(Cambodia) Kong Hov	4th National Champion 2024	Phnom Penh, Cambodia	Decision (Unanimous)	3	3:00
January 31, 2024	Win	(Cambodia) Morn Sameth	Kun Khmer National Gold Medal 2023	Kampong Speu, Cambodia	Decision (Split)	3	3:00
Wins the 2023 Kun Khmer National Championship title.
January 30, 2024	Win	(Cambodia) Vorn Maphang	Kun Khmer National Gold Medal 2023	Kampong Chhnang, Cambodia	TKO	2	0.40
January 29, 2024	Win	(Cambodia) Phan Lihuor	Kun Khmer National Gold Medal 2023	Kampong Chhnang, Cambodia	Decision	3	3:00
Legend: Win Loss Draw/no contest Notes

== Early life and personal life ==
Sambath married Chin Sinat on June 25, 2024, in Kampong Speu.

== Music and Videography ==
- October 2, 2023: Sambath feet [ft] Thach Sathen as a music video Pchum Ben Days 2023 Mahoub Da'aksrak [Khmer title: ម្ហូបដាក់ស្រាក់]
