= Khun Bora =

Cambodian fighter (born 1997)

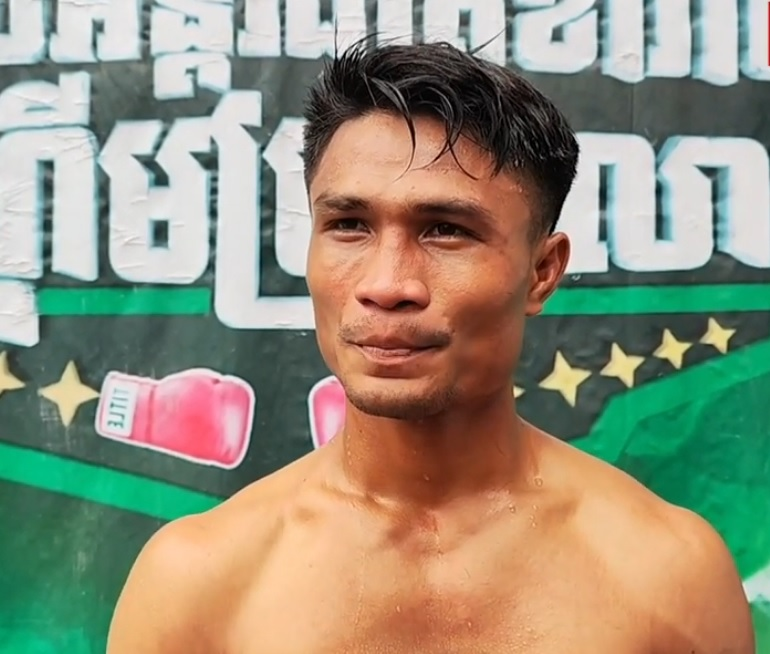
- Born: February 7, 1997 (age 29)
- Other names: Khim Bora; Golden Dragon Khim Bora; Banteay Meanchey Gold Dragon; Golden Dragon of Banteay Meanchey province ឃីម បូរ៉ា
- Weight: 60 kg (130 lb; 9.4 st); 63.5 kg (140 lb; 10.00 st)
- Style: Kun Khmer

Khun Bora who goes by the stage name of Khim Bora is a Cambodian Kun Khmer fighter. The Kampuchea Thmey Daily previously listed him as a top 10 Kun Khmer boxer in early 2023. Bora was listed as a top 5 Kun Khmer fighter at 60 kg in 2025 by CSB Sport.

== Fighting career ==
Khim Bora was declared the winner of the Khmer Boxing Federation championship in July 2021. The championship final took places on the biggest night in months for the Khmer Boxing Federation. Bora was knocked out by Meun Mekkha at the end of the third round via a knockout that was against the rules of Khmer boxing. Initially, the decision of the federation and CNC TV was to postpone the match for two weeks but after review the federation gave the final verdict to Khim Bora. Khim Bora received 20 million riel. Both athletes have fought each other three times with Khim Bora winning all three matches.

Khim Bora was scheduled to participate in the Samdech Pichey Sena Tea Banh Cup at TV5 Boxing Arena. The tournament featured eight of Cambodia's top martial artist competing in the 60 kilogram category. The reward for the first and second-place winners included a lot, twin villa and 10x20 house and cash prizes. Chhut Serey Vannthong defeated Khim Bora and won the "Samdech Pichey Sena Tea Banh" belt. The results was a split decision with Vannthong winning 3–2 to Bora. Some fans were critical of the verdict and blamed the judges.

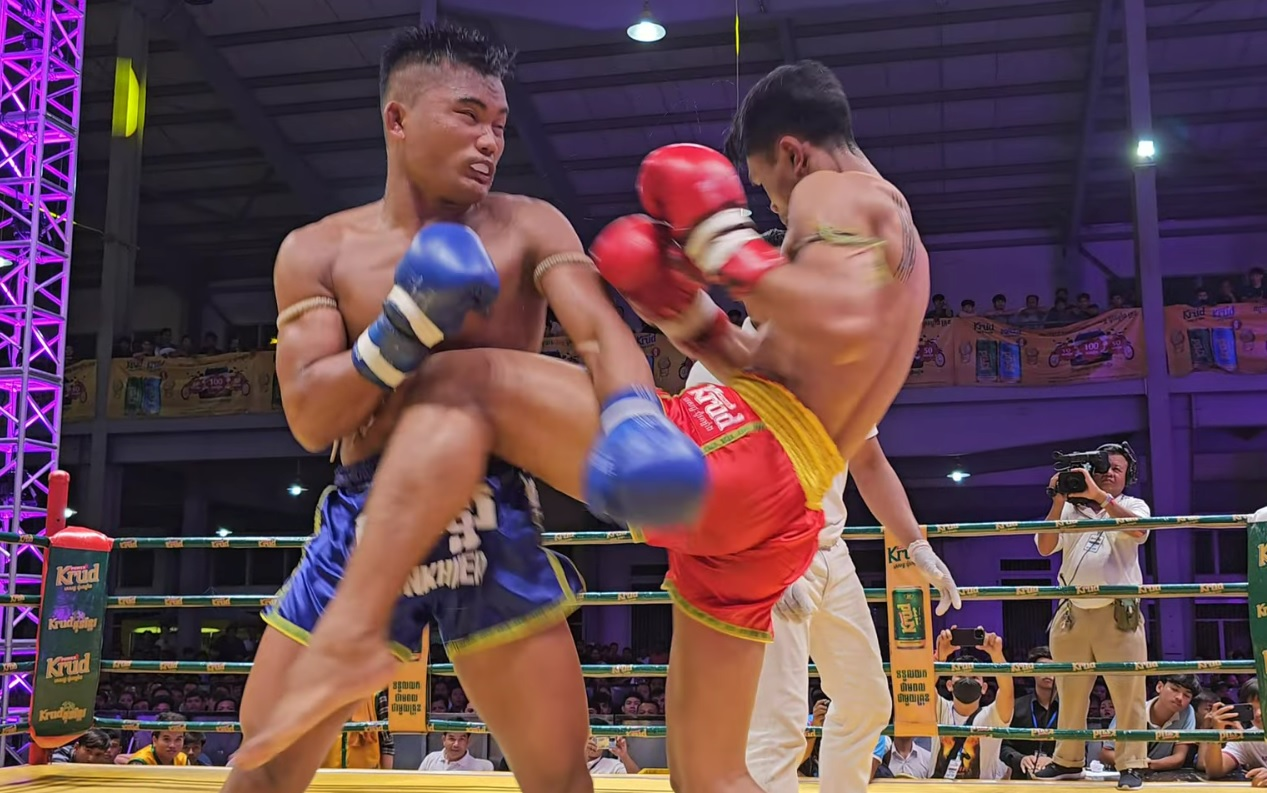
Bora uses a knee strike against Pich Sambath

At Southeast Asian Games 2023, Bora won a gold medal in the 63.5 kg weight division for men.

Fans wanted Bora to fight Japanese boxer Taimu Hisai after he defeated many Cambodian athletes including Chhut Serey Vannthong and Pich Sambath.

Khim Bora was scheduled to return to the sport after being missing from the ring for several months due to a hand injury. Bora was scheduled to compete in the Krud Kun Khmer ring on January 18, 2025 at Sunshine Park, Boeung Kak Lake, Phnom Penh. The event was scheduled to be broadcast live on the TVK page and national television.

Bora was knocked out in the second round by Spanish martial artist, Mario, on February 8, 2025 in Madrid, Spain. He expressed interest in a rematch.

Bora was victorious over Tum Kiti and defended his Krud Kun Khmer belt on April 15, 2025. His opponent, Tum Kiti, once defeated Pich Sambath in Australia.

Medal record

Men's Kun Khmer

Representing Cambodia

Southeast Asian Games
| Gold medal – first place | 2023 Phnom Penh | Men's 63.5 kg |

In July 2025, CSB Sport listed Khim Bora as a top 5 Kun Khmer fighter at 60 kg alongside Chhut Serey Vannthong, Pich Sambath, Sok Thy, and Beut Sangkhum. Sok Thy said he wouldn't compete with Khim Bora because he doesn't compete against athletes from the same home province of Banteay Meanchey.

Bora was scheduled to compete against Mehdi Rezaie on January 10, 2026.

== Titles ==
Bora has three 60 kg CNC arena titles. He won the titles by defeating top boxers in Meun Mekhea, Chhut Serey Vannthong and Tan Makara.

== Fight record ==
Professional Fight record
| Date | Result | Opponent | Event | Location | Method | Round | Time |
|---|---|---|---|---|---|---|---|
| September 11, 2026 | Win | (New Zealand) Shihan Gao | Boostrong Kun Khmer to New Zealand | Auckland, New Zealand | Decision | 3 | |
| August 8, 2026 | Win | (China) Zhang Xicheng | Town Boxing | Cambodia | TKO | 2 | 1:42 |
| May 30, 2026 | Win | (Iran) Mahdi Abasi | Kun Khmer on Bayon TV | Cambodia | TKO(elbow strike) | 2 | 2:15 |
| February 21, 2026 | Win | (Morocco) Akdahe Boujmaa | Kun Khmer on Bayon TV | Cambodia | KO | 1 | 1:00 |
| February 8, 2026 | Win | (Cambodia) Hong Sovanchansothy | Hang Meas Kun Khmer | Cambodia | Decision | 5 | |
| January 24, 2026 | Win | (Iran) Amirali Yousefi | Bayon TV | Cambodia | TKO | 1 | 0:54 |
| January 10, 2026 | Win | (Iran) Mehdi Rezaie | Bayon TV | Cambodia | KO | 1 | 1:00 |
| November 5, 2025 | Win | (Iran) Mohammad Hassan Rahimi | Bayon TV | Sihanoukville, Cambodia | Decision | 3 | |
| June 29, 2025 | Win | (Malaysia) Wan Mohhanad Sabri | Krud Kun Khmer - TVK arena | Phnom Penh, Cambodia | TKO | 2 | 0:44 |
| February 22, 2025 | Win | (Morocco) Khalid Jib | Krud Kun Khmer | Cambodia | Decision | 5 | |
| February 8, 2025 | Loss | (Spain) Mario Alvarez | Kun Khmer Super Fight: Spain | Spain | KO | 2 | 0:12 |
| June 29, 2024 | Win | (Azerbaijan) Akif Guluzada | Hang Meas Kun Khmer | Phnom Penh, Cambodia | Decision | 3 | |
| June 2, 2024 | Loss | (Cambodia) Chhut Serey Vannthong | Kun Khmer Super Fight 2: Bordeaux | Bordeaux, France | Decision | 3 | |
| April 14, 2024 | Win | (Thailand) Mongkolpetch Petchyindee Academy | Krud Kun Khmer | Cambodia | Decision | 5 | |
| December 30, 2023 | Win | (Laos) Ananthasak | CTN | Cambodia | TKO | 1 | 0:14 |
| September 3, 2023 | Loss | (Cambodia) Pich Sambath | Krud Kun Khmer | Phnom Penh, Cambodia | Decision | 5 | |
| April 8, 2023 | Win | (Malaysia) Kumarit Wolves | Town Boxing | Kampot Province, Cambodia | Decision | 3 | |
| February 27, 2023 | Loss | (Thailand) Samingdet Nor.Anuwatgym | Kun Khmer All Star | Phnom Penh, Cambodia | Decision | 3 | |
| January 7, 2023 | Win | (Brazil) Alexandre | Town Boxing | Cambodia | Decision | 3 | |
| November 24, 2022 | Loss | (Cambodia) Chhut Serey Vannthong | TV5 Cambodia | Cambodia | Decision | 5 | |
| June 25, 2022 | Win | (Vietnam) Nguyễn Trần Duy Nhất | Town Boxing | Svay Rieng, Cambodia | Decision | 3 | |
| July 10, 2021 | Win | (Cambodia) Meun Mekhea | CNC Boxing | Phnom Penh, Cambodia | DQ(illegal technique) | 3 | |
| January 9, 2021 | Win | (Cambodia) Meun Mekhea | CNC Boxing | Phnom Penh, Cambodia | Decision | 5 | |
| October 10, 2020 | Win | (Cambodia) Chhut Serey Vannthong | CNC | Phnom Penh, Cambodia | Decision | 5 | |
| June 28, 2020 | Win | (Cambodia) Kong Hov | PNN Sports | Phnom Penh, Cambodia | Decision | 3 | |
| June 13, 2020 | Win | (Cambodia) Tanh Makara | CTN | Phnom Penh, Cambodia | Decision | 5 | |
