= Daren Rolland =

French male kickboxer

- Born: 28 September 1998 (age 28); Paris, France
- Nationality: French
- Height: 1.78 m (5 ft 10 in)
- Weight: 56.7 kg (125 lb; 8 st 13 lb)
- Division: Featherweight
- Style: Kickboxing
- Fighting out of: Paris, France
- Team: Team El Quandili
- Trainer: Abel El Quandili
- Years active: 2017-present

Kickboxing record
- Total: 31
- Wins: 20
- By knockout: 8
- Losses: 11
- By knockout: 2

Daren Louis Jose Rolland (born 28 September 1998) is a French Muay Thai fighter who has been competing professionally since 2017. He is the current WMO Featherweight International Champion and former WBC Muaythai Featherweight World Champion.

He is the winner of the 2016 IFMA World Junior Championship and 2017 European Senior Championship. He is the 2018 FFKMDA Featherweight Muay Thai champion.

== Martial arts career ==
=== WBC Muaythai ===
He fought for the first major honor of his professional career in 2019, when he was set to for the WBC Muaythai International Featherweight title. His opponent was the future WBC Muaythai International Super Bantamweight title holder, Ryan Sheehan. Rolland captured the title with a third round TKO.

Rolland was scheduled to fight during Cadiz Fight Night 2, when he was set to face Carlos Coello for the vacant WBC Muaythai World Featherweight title. It was a fight between the current and former WBC Muaythai International champions. Rolland won the fight through a second round knockout.

=== European professional circuit ===
Rolland was scheduled to participate in the Festival La Belle Equipe muay thai tournament, held on 8 December 2021. He was set to face Abdel Cherragi in the tournament semifinals. He beat both Cherragi and Quentin Alhamdou in the finals in the same manner, by decision.

Rolland was booked to face Silviu Vitez in the semifinals of the one-day four-man MFC tournament, held at MFC 025 on 3 December 2022. He beat Vitez by a second-round technical knockout and was able to overcome Iker Valderrama by unanimous decision in the tournament finals. Rolland was next booked to face Fayçal Bahroumi at Duel en Terre des Farangs on 7 January 2023. Bahroumi withdrew from the bout on 19 December, and was replaced by Brandon Vieira.

Rolland faced Brandon Vieira for the second time in his career at Duel en Terre des Farangs 2 on 7 January 2023. He won the rematch by unanimous decision.

Rolland faced Daniel McGowan for the WMO International -57.5 kg title at the inaugural Hitman Fight League event on 23 April 2023. He won the fight by a third-round knockout.

Rolland faced Imad El Hamzi at Victory Arena on 25 November 2023. He won the fight by a first-round knockout.

=== One Championship ===
In late 2019 Rolland signed with ONE Championship. He was soon thereafter scheduled to fight Sam-A Gaiyanghadao during ONE Championship: Century Part 1. While the first round of his fight with the former Lumpini Stadium champion was competitive, Sam-A took over the momentum in the second round. The Thai native scored an early knockdown and, two minutes into the fight, knocked Rolland down with a short left hook. Rolland failed to get up during the ten second countdown, and Sam-A won the fight through a second round KO.

Rolland faced Kompetch Fairtex at ONE Friday Fights 47 on 12 January. 2024. He lost the fight by a third-round knockout.

== Championships accomplishments ==
=== Professional ===
- Mamba Fight Club
  - 2022 MFC Muaythai -60 kg Tournament Winner
- World Boxing Council Muaythai
  - WBC Muaythai World Featherweight (-57.153 kg) Championship (One time, current)
  - WBC Muaythai International Featherweight (-57.153 kg) Championship (One time, former)
- Fédération Française de Kick Boxing, Muaythaï et Disciplines Associées
  - FFKMDA Featherweight (-57 kg) Muay Thai Championship
- World Muaythai Council
  - 2022 WMC Intercontinental Featherweight Champion

=== Amateur ===
- International Federation of Muaythai Associations
  - 2016 IFMA World Championships Junior -54 kg (gold)
  - 2016 IFMA Youth World Championships Junior -54 kg (bronze)
  - 2016 IFMA European Championships B-class -54 kg (gold)
  - 2022 IFMA European Senior Championships -57 kg (bronze)
  - 2022 IFMA World Senior Championships -57 kg (gold)
  - 2024 IFMA World Senior Championships -57 kg (gold)
- World Games
  - 2025 World Games Muay Thai -57 kg (bronze)

== Fight record ==
Professional Kickboxing Record
21 Wins (9 (T)KO's), 11 Losses, 0 Draw, 0 No Contest
Date	Result	Opponent	Event	Location	Method	Round	Time
2026-04-18	Loss	(Thailand) YodPT Petchrungruang	Trieste Fight Night	Trieste, Italy	Decision	3	:00
2024-12-14	Win	(Thailand) Phetmedmai Sit.Nonglek	Trieste Fight Night	Trieste, Italy	KO	2	
2024-11-30	Loss	(Cambodia) Pich Sambath	Xtreme Cambodia Kun Khmer	Phnom Penh, Cambodia	TKO (3 Knockdowns)	2	
2024-08-17	Loss	(United Kingdom) Owen Gillis	MASDA Fight Night	Liverpool, England	Decision (Unanimous)	5	3:00
Lost the WMO International featherweight (-57.5kg) title.
2024-06-27	Loss	(United Kingdom) Finlay Smith	La Belle Equipe Festival, Semifinals	Paris, France	Decision	3	3:00
2024-01-12	Loss	(Thailand) Kompetch Fairtex	ONE Friday Fights 47	Bangkok, Thailand	TKO (3 Knockdowns)	3	2:11
2023-11-25	Win	(Morocco) Imad El Hamzi	Victory Arena	Lille, France	KO	1	
2023-04-23	Win	(United Kingdom) Daniel McGowan	Hitman Fight League	London, England	KO (Knee to the body)	3	
Wins the WMO International featherweight (-57.5kg) title.
2023-01-07	Win	(France) Brandon Vieira	Duel en Terre des Farangs 2	Orléans, France	Decision (Unanimous)	3	3:00
2022-12-03	Win	(Spain) Iker Valderrama	MFC Showdown 25, Final	Ponferrada, Spain	Decision (Unanimous)	3	3:00
Wins the MFC Muay Thai -60kg Tournament title.
2022-12-03	Win	(Romania) Silviu Vitez	MFC Showdown 25, Semi Final	Ponferrada, Spain	TKO (Doctor stoppage)	2	
2022-11-19	Win	(France) Brandon Vieira	Arena Victory	Lille, France	Decision (Unanimous)	5	3:00
2022-08-27	Win	(Lebanon) Omar Halabi	Victory Road Championships	Tarablus, Lebanon	Decision	5	3:00
Wins the vacant WMC Intercontinental Featherweight title.
2022-07-02	Win	(France) Quentin Alhamdou	Le Choc des Best Fighters 6	Asnières-sur-Seine, France	Decision	5	3:00
Wins the FFKMDA Featherweight (-57 kg) Muay Thai title.
2022-06-18	Win	(Thailand) Rachtananchai	La Belle Equipe Festival	Paris, France	Decision	5	3:00
2022-03-26	Win	(France) Mohamed Ghulam	1/2 Finales Championnat de France Pro	Aulnay-sous-Bois, France	KO	1	
2021-12-08	Win	(France) Quentin Alhamdou	Festival La Belle Equipe, Tournament Final	Paris, France	Decision	5	3:00
Wins the Festival La Belle Equipe Featherweight (-57 kg) tournament title.
2021-12-08	Win	(France) Abdel Cherragi	Festival La Belle Equipe, Tournament Semifinal	Paris, France	Decision	5	3:00
2021-07-10	Loss	(France) Luc Genieys	Le Choc des Etoiles 5, Tournament Semifinal	Châteauneuf-les-Martigues, France	Decision	3	3:00
2019-10-13	Loss	(Thailand) Sam-A Gaiyanghadao	ONE Championship: Century Part 1	Tokyo, Japan	KO (Left Hook)	2	1:20
2019-08-01	Win	(Spain) Carlos Coello	Cadiz Fight Night 2	Cadiz, Spain	KO	2	
Wins the WBC Muaythai World Featherweight (-57.153 kg) title.
2019-06-15	Loss	(France) Mathis Djanoyan	Le Choc Des Etoiles 4	Châteauneuf-les-Martigues, France	Decision (Unanimous)	3	3:00
2019-04-20	Win	(Portugal) Diogo Silva	Kona Fight	Villiers-sur-Marne, France	Decision (Unanimous)	3	3:00
2019-03-09	Win	(France) Abdel Cherragi	TEK Fight II	Meaux, France	Decision (Unanimous)	3	3:00
2019-02-16	Win	(Republic of Ireland) Ryan Sheehan	Rumble At The Rockies	Cork, Ireland	TKO (Punches)	3	
Wins the WBC Muaythai International Featherweight (-57.153 kg) title.
2019-01-18	Win	(France) Osvaldo Leal Labrada	Elite Fight VI	Saint-Brieuc, France	Decision (Unanimous)	3	3:00
2018-07-22	Loss	(France) Luc Genieys	Le Choc Des Gladiateurs	Le Lavandou, France	Decision (Unanimous)	3	3:00
2018-06-02	Win	(France) Dylan Delpha	Final Fight	Bagnols-sur-Cèze, France	KO	2	
2018-05-05	Loss	(Portugal) Frederico Cordeiro	Phenix Boxing Only - Edition 6	Saint-Julien-en-Genevois, France	Decision (Unanimous)	3	3:00
2018-03-03	Win	(France) Akram Hamidi	TEK Fight	Meaux, France	Decision (Unanimous)	3	3:00
2017-11-25	Win	(France) Sid Ali Sad	Faubourg Actif 7	Lille, France	TKO (Retirement)	2	3:00
2017-10-14	Loss	(France) Akram Hamidi	Shock Muay 9	Saint-Denis, France	Decision (Unanimous)	3	3:00
Legend: Win Loss Draw/No contest Notes

Amateur Muay Thai record
Date	Result	Opponent	Event	Location	Method	Round	Time
2026-10-21	Loss	(Russia) Alexander Glagolev	IFMA European Championship, Quarterfinals	Paris, France	Decision (29:28)	3	3:00
2025-08-10	Win	(Vietnam) Nguyễn Trần Duy Nhất	2025 World Games, Bronze Medal fight	Chengdu, China	Decision (30:27)	3	3:00
Wins the 2025 World Games Muay Thai −57kg Bronze Medal.
2025-08-09	Loss	(Israel) Ruach Gordon	2025 World Games, Semifinals	Chengdu, China	Decision (30:27)	3	3:00
2025-08-08	Win	(United Arab Emirates) Mohamed Touizi	2025 World Games, Quarterfinals	Chengdu, China	Decision (30:27)	3	3:00
2024-06-09	Win	(Ukraine) Dmytro Shelesko	IFMA 2024 World Championships, Final	Patras, Greece	Decision (29:28)	3	3:00
Wins the 2024 IFMA World Championships −57kg Gold Medal.
2024-06-07	Win	(Iraq) Ali Kinanah	IFMA 2024 World Championships, Semifinals	Patras, Greece	Decision (29:28)	3	3:0
2024-06-06	Win	(Armenia) Narek Khachikyan	IFMA 2024 World Championships, Quarterfinals	Patras, Greece	Decision (29:28)	3	3:00
2024-06-03	Win	(Kazakhstan) Zakir Belyalov	IFMA 2024 World Championships, First Round	Patras, Greece	Decision (29:28)	3	3:00
2023-05-08	Loss	(Israel) Ruach Gordon	IFMA Senior World Championships 2023, Quarter Final	Bangkok, Thailand	Decision (29:28)	3	3:00
2023-05-06	Win	(United Arab Emirates) Ahmed Alshammar	IFMA Senior World Championships 2023, Second Round	Bangkok, Thailand	TKO	2	
2022-06-04	Win	(Turkey) Samet Kartal	IFMA Senior World Championships 2022, Final	Abu Dhabi, United Arab Emirates	Decision (Unanimous)	3	3:00
Wins 2022 IFMA World Championship -57kg Gold Medal.
2022-06-02	Win	(Thailand) Yothin Hamuthai	IFMA Senior World Championships 2022, Semi Finals	Abu Dhabi, United Arab Emirates	Decision (Unanimous)	3	3:00
2022-05-31	Win	(Spain) Mikel Fernandez Cia	IFMA Senior World Championships 2022, Quarter Finals	Abu Dhabi, United Arab Emirates	Decision (Unanimous)	3	3:00
2022-02-19	Loss	(Ukraine) Vladyslav Mykytas	2022 IFMA European Championship, Semi Final	Istanbul, Turkey	Decision (29:28)	3	3:00
Wins 2022 IFMA European Championship -57kg Bronze Medal.
2022-02-17	Win	(Cyprus) Ismail Al Kadhi	2022 IFMA European Championship, Quarter Final	Istanbul, Turkey	Decision (30:27)	3	3:00
2017-05-08	Loss	(Thailand) Kokkrachai Chotichanin	2017 IFMA World Championship, Quarter Final	Bangkok, Thailand	Decision (30:27)	3	3:00
2016-10-29	Win	(Turkey) Bekir Karaomeroglu	2016 IFMA Junior European Championship, Final	Split, Croatia	Decision (30:27)	3	3:00
Wins 2016 IFMA Junior European Championship -54kg Gold Medal.
2016-05-27	Win	(Spain) Martin Mansilla	2016 IFMA Junior World Championship, Final	Bangkok, Thailand	Decision (30:27)	3	3:00
Wins 2016 IFMA Junior World Championship -57kg Gold Medal.
2016-05-25	Win	(Belarus) Kernozhyiski	2016 IFMA Junior World Championship, Semi Final	Bangkok, Thailand	TKO	2	
2015-12-05	Draw	(Belgium) Zakaria Miri	King of Brussels	Brussels, Belgium	Decision	3	2:00
2015	Loss	(France) Clément Adrover	2015 French Junior Muay Thai Championships, Semi Final	France	Decision	3	3:00
Legend: Win Loss Draw/No contest Notes

== See also ==
- List of male kickboxers
