= Pich Sophann =

Kun Khmer Trainer (born 1982)

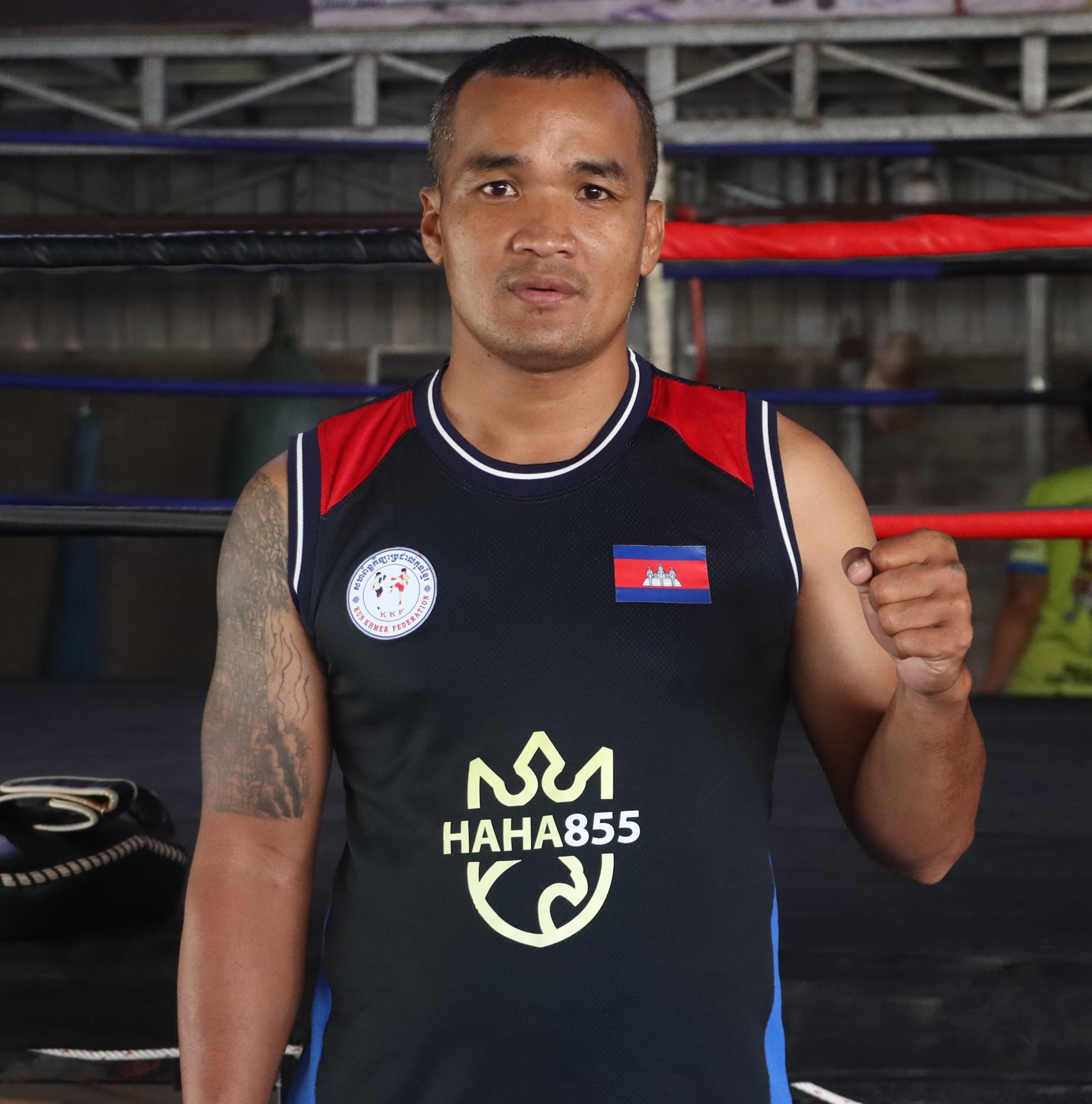
- Pich Sophann In his Kun Khmer Gym 2023
- Born: Pich Sophann; July 1, 1982 (age 44); Porrumchang, Preykabass, Takeo, Cambodia
- Other names: Heavy Fist Punch Pich Sophann; Pech Sophan
- Education: High School (dropout)
- Occupations: Kun Khmer Trainer; Judge of Boxing Arena; Businessman; lieutenant
- Years active: 1999–present
- Title: Founder of Pich Sophann 8888 Kun Khmer Gym (formerly Kun Khmer Association 157 Gym.)
- Spouse: Thach Chanda (m. 2015)
- Children: 3
- Relatives: Sophan Somary (daughter); Sophan Pich (son); Sophan Tiger (son); Pich Seyha (younger brother)
- Website: www.facebook.com/pichsophankun

Pich Sophann (also spelled Pich Sophan or Pech Sophan; Khmer: ពេជ្រ សុផាន់) is a retired professional Kun Khmer fighter and kickboxer. He is currently a Kun Khmer coach and the founder of the Pich Sophann 8888 Kun Khmer Gym and Kun Khmer Grassroots Super Fight and Gym. Sophan trains about 40 athletes including Cambodian champion Pich Sambath.

During his fighting career from 1999 to 2009, Sophann was nicknamed the "Heavy Fist Punch Fighter". Sophann gained recognition for his quick and powerful punches. His success also inspired his brother, Pich Seyha, to pursue Kun Khmer. As a member of the Boxing Association of the Ministry of National Defense, he won several national championships in the 57 kg, 63.5 kg, and 67 kg categories. He notably claimed the 57 kg title at the Channel 5 arena in 2004.

== Early and personal life ==
Pich Sophann was born on July 1, 1982, in Prey Kabas District, Takeo Province, Cambodia, into a farming family with five siblings. Among them, only Sophann and his brother Pich Seyha pursued Kun Khmer (Pradal serey). He developed discipline and skills that contributed to his later success in the sport. Sophann trained under Chhit Sarim, a Khmer kickboxing instructor at the National Defense Council Center, alongside other students such as Eh Phouthong, Oth Phouthong, Meas Chhan, Prum Sothear, Chhay Kosal, Noun Sorya, and Kong Sarran.

After retiring as a fighter, Sophann became fully committed to promoting Kun Khmer and training new athletes interested in the sport, whether for recreation or as a professional career. He has stated: "Fame can come true from ourselves being strong first, then other circles or institutions will help us."

Following his move to Phnom Penh to pursue Kun Khmer, Sophann spent 12 years as a professional martial artist. He married Thach Chenda, the owner of a salon in Por Senchey, Phnom Penh, on March 8, 2015. The couple has one daughter and two sons.

Although Sophann's wife does not favor boxing, he has expressed that he would not prevent their children from pursuing Kun Khmer if they developed an interest in the sport.

== Career ==
=== 1999–2009: Fighting career ===
Pich Sophann trained in Kun Khmer under Chhit Sarim at the National Defense Ministry Gym. He began competing in 1999 at the Old Stadium and gained recognition in the 57 kg and 63.5 kg divisions. After joining the national team, he won a belt by defeating Try Kunthor in the finals and competed against notable opponents such as Mey Sopheap, Sen Bunthen, Voy Sothoun, Lor Samnang, and Phav Pheurk. In the 67 kg division, he recorded frequent victories, with the exception of bouts against Phal Sophat.

During his career, Sophann competed in over 400 matches, including international bouts, televised events, and competitions along the Khmer–Thai border. Due to physical health issues, he retired from active competition in 2009 and transitioned to work as a judge and member of competition committees.

He also gained coaching experience in Australia, where he trained athletes for four years. Additionally, he held a civil service position in the Royal Cambodian Armed Forces, contributing to over 20 years of involvement in Kun Khmer.

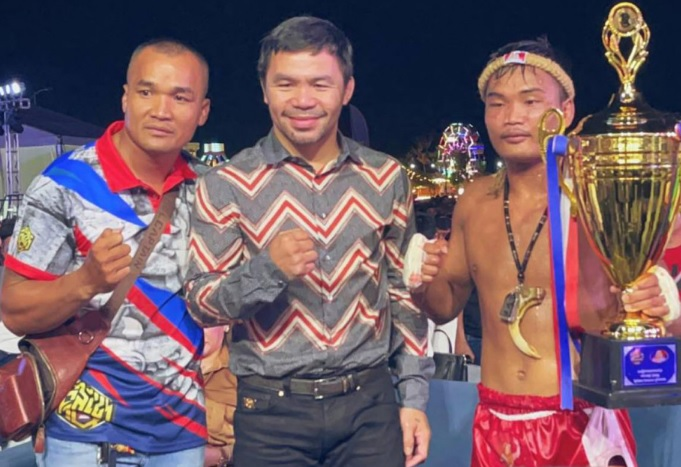
Coach Pich Sophann, Manny Pacquiao, and Pich Sambath after a Kun Khmer show.

=== 2010–2018: Transition to coaching ===
After retiring as a fighter, Sophann became a trainer at the National Defense Kun Khmer Gym and served as a judge and member of competition committees. In 2017, he was appointed a lieutenant in the Ministry of Defense.

In 2018, he founded the 157 Kun Khmer Association Gym in Sangkat Choam Chao 2, Phnom Penh, to promote Kun Khmer. He financed the gym himself and provided free training courses for students.

=== 2019–2022: Gym development and COVID-19 ===
In 2019, the gym was renamed the Kun Khmer Cambodian Youth Movement Boxing Club. During the COVID-19 pandemic, the club temporarily closed and reopened in 2021.

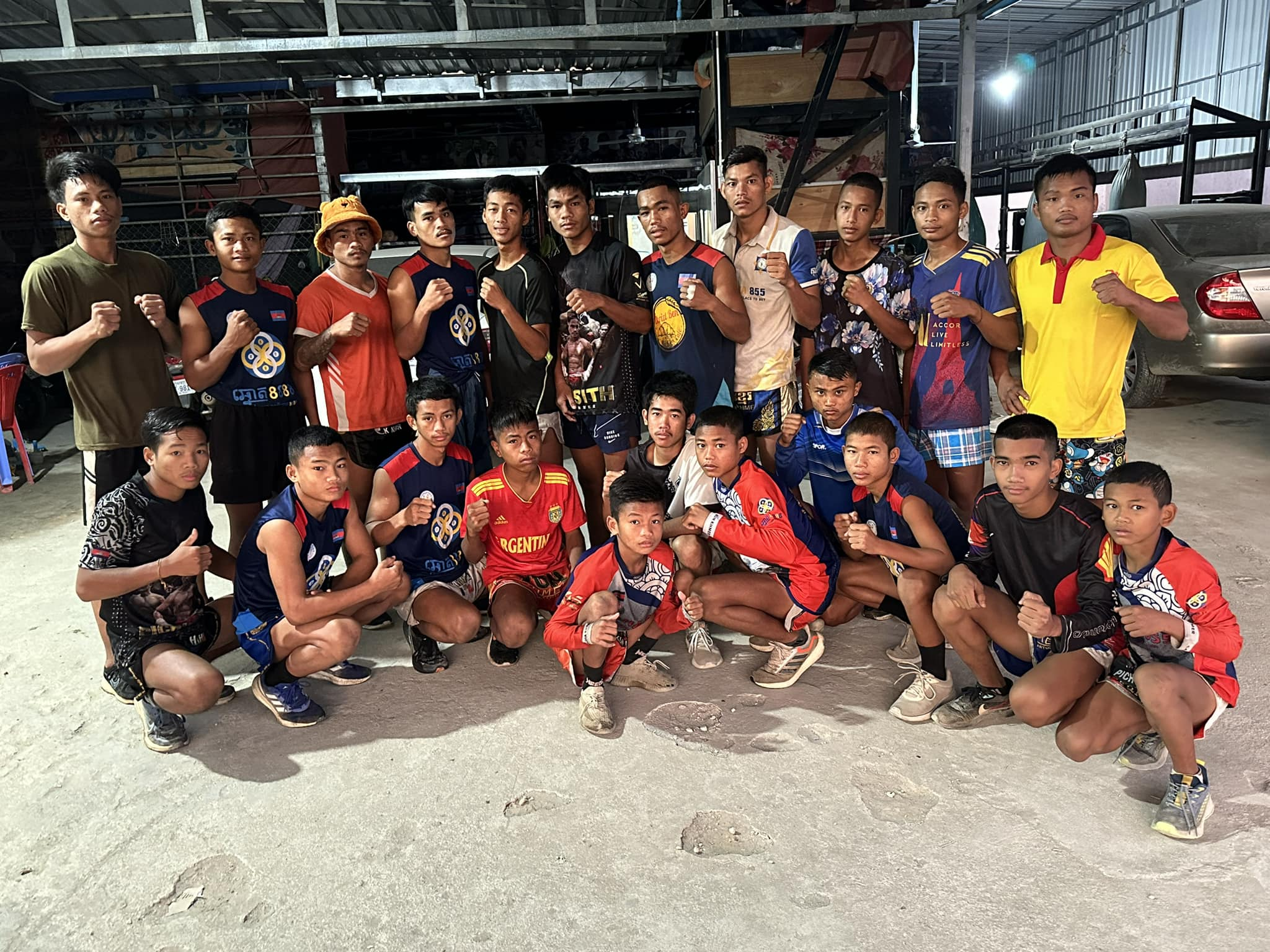
Pich Sophann students in Pich Sophan 8888 Kun Khmer Gym 2024

=== 2023–present: Pich Sophann 8888 Kun Khmer Gym and competitive success ===
In July 2023, Sophann reestablished his gym as the Pich Sophann 8888 Kun Khmer Gym, training approximately 40 students. He continues to personally fund the gym so that training remains free of charge.

In 2023, he also founded the Kun Khmer Grassroots Super Fight and Gym. Sophann operates a small business selling Kun Khmer training equipment. His students include Pich Seyha (retired), Pich Kakada (retired), Pich Bunsith, Pich Sambath, and Pich Atitep. That year, his trainees won eight championship belts in various competitions.

=== 2024: Recent achievements ===
In early 2024, Pich Sambath won a belt for Sophann. On March 1, 2024, Pich Bunsith defeated Bun Sothea, a student of Thun Sophea, to claim a KKF belt with a prize of 20 million riels (US$5,000) for the Pich Sophann 8888 Kun Khmer Gym. In May 2024, Sambath defeated Thun Vanna to win a Krud belt.

By November 2024, Sophann's students had secured five national and international belts. On November 15, 2024, Town TV Sport awarded him the Outstanding Coach Cup.

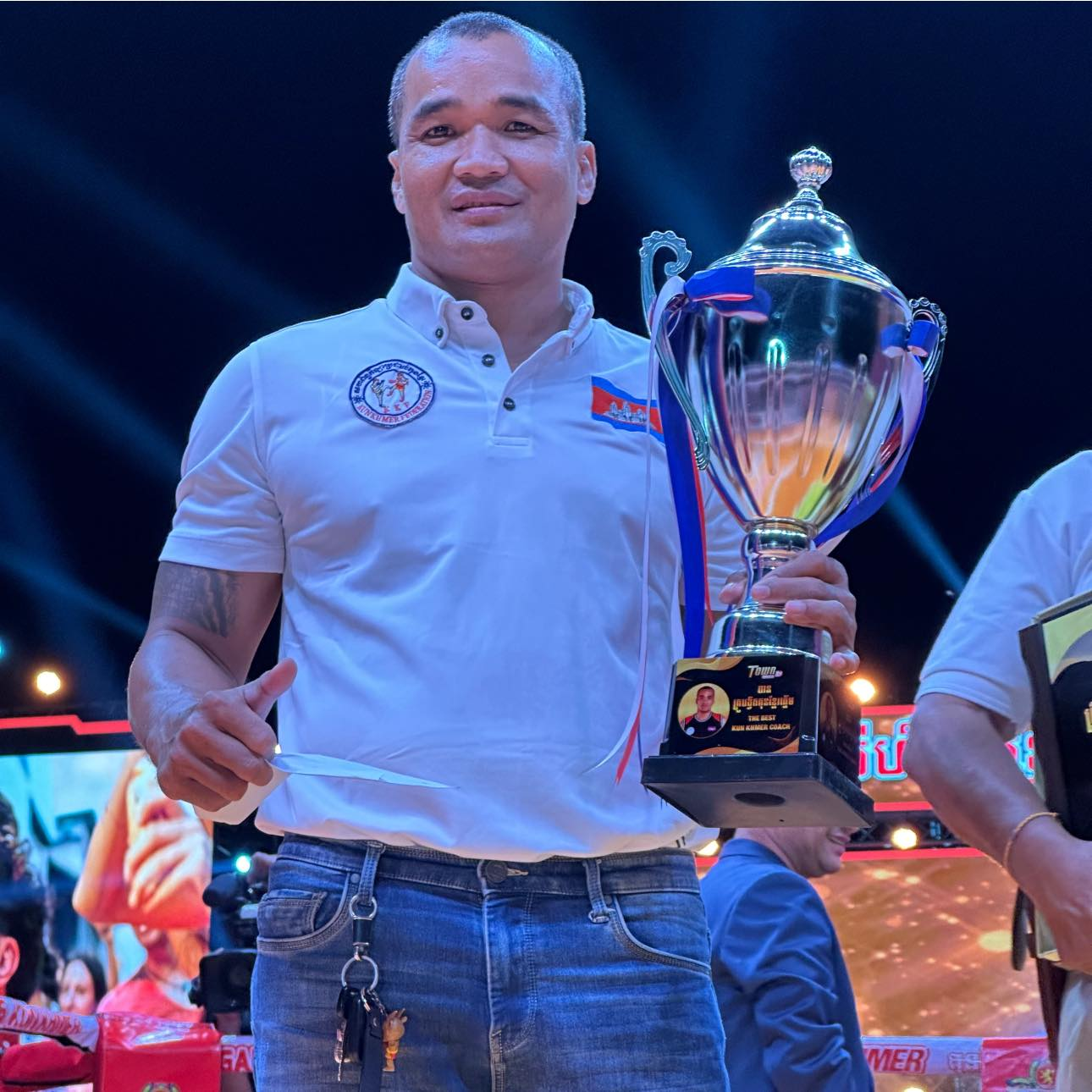
Pich Sophann receiving the Outstanding Coach Cup from Town TV Sport (November 15, 2024).

==== November 2024 victory series ====
National titles

- Pich Bunsith – Krud Kun Khmer Champion, 57 kg MMA Glove Title (def. Ourch Thearith).
- Pich Sambath – Krud Kun Khmer Champion, 60 kg MMA Glove Title (def. Ncedo Gomba).
- Pich Reaksmey – V-Active Grassroots Kun Khmer Champion, 48 kg Title (def. Prak Sina).

International titles (Malaysia)

- Pich Atitep – King of the Ring Champions Kudamerah, 57 kg Title (def. Izzt Zaki).
- Pich Kakada – King of the Ring Champions Kudamerah, 57 kg Title (def. Amitul Hakim).

== Achievements ==
- 2024 – Outstanding Kun Khmer Coach Award from Town Television.
- 2004 – TV5 Cambodia Champion Belt, 57 kg, after defeating Try Kunthor.

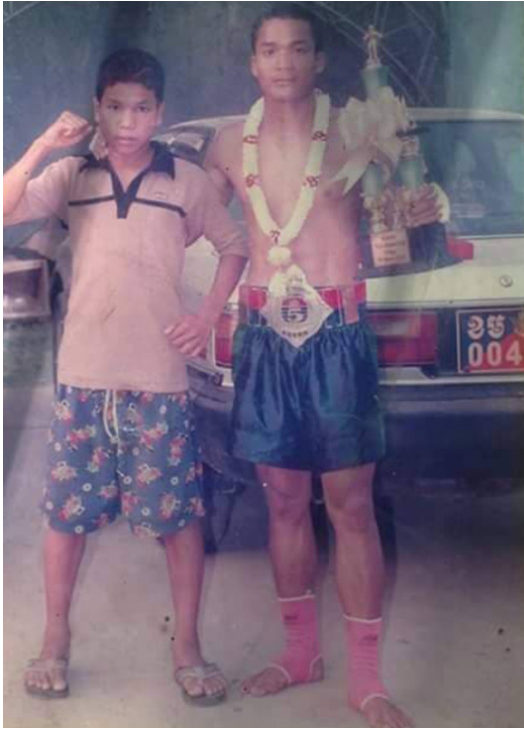
Pich Sophann (right) with Pich Seyha (left) after winning the TV5 Cambodia Champion Belt, 57 kg, 2004

== Fight Records ==
Kun Khmer record
Total Fight 200, ?? wins (?? Win by TKOs), ?? losses, ?? draws
Date	Result	Opponent	Event	Location	Method	Round	Time
November 8, 2008	Loss	(England) Tim Thomas	CTN Arena Fight 60 kg	Phnom Penh, Cambodia	Decision	5	3:00
September 2008	Win	(Cambodia) Chan Vireak	BTV Arena 63.5 kg	Phnom Penh, Cambodia	TKO (Stoppage)	4	
May 2008	Win	(Cambodia) Mai Socheat	TV5 Arena 63.5 kg	Phnom Penh, Cambodia	TKO (Stoppage)	2	
May 2008	Loss	(Iran) Abbas Ahmadi	TV5 Arena	Phnom Penh, Cambodia	Decision	5	3:00
April 2008	Win	(Cambodia) Mai Socheat	BTV Arena 63.5 kg	Phnom Penh, Cambodia	TKO (Stoppage)	2	2:10
March 2008	Win	(Cambodia) Pov Saksith	TV5 Carabao Arena	Phnom Penh, Cambodia	Decision	5	3:00
February 2008	Loss	(Cambodia) Meas Channa	TV5 Carabao Arena (Rematch)	Phnom Penh, Cambodia	TKO	2	2:40
February 26, 2008	Loss	(Cambodia) Vong Si Thai	TV5 RCAF Arena Fight for 3rd Place 60 kg	Phnom Penh, Cambodia	Stoppage	4	N/A
2007	Loss	(Cambodia) Sen Bunthen	TV5 RCAF Arena Carabao	Phnom Penh, Cambodia	Decision	5	3:00
2007	Loss	(Cambodia) Bun Sothea	TV5 RCAF Arena	Phnom Penh, Cambodia	Decision	4	
2006	Win	(Australia) Corel Konsaknio	WBC MuayThai	Sydney, Australia	Decision	5	3:00
2006	Loss	(Cambodia) Phum Saray	TV5 RCAF Arena	Phnom Penh, Cambodia	TKO	2	
March 26, 2006	Win	(Cambodia) Soeng Vicheka	TV5 Carabao Arena	Phnom Penh, Cambodia	Decision	5	3:00
2006	Loss	(Cambodia) Phav Pheurk	TV5 RCAF Arena	Phnom Penh, Cambodia	Decision	5	3:00
2006	Win	(Thailand) Yutta Narwee	WMC Arena	Sydney, Australia	Decision	5	3:00
2006	Win	(Cambodia) Phav Pheurk	TV5 RCAF Arena	Phnom Penh, Cambodia	Decision	5	3:00
2005	Loss	(Cambodia) Phav Pheurk	TV5 RCAF Arena	Phnom Penh, Cambodia	TKO	2	
2005	Win	(Cambodia) Lor Samnang	TV5 RCAF Arena National Friendly	Phnom Penh, Cambodia	Decision	5	3:00
2004	Win	(Cambodia) Try Kunthor	TV5 RCAF Arena Championship	Phnom Penh, Cambodia	TKO		

== Filmography ==
- January 2024 – Portrayed "A Thief Team Leader" in the video film Pheakdey Sne (ភក្តីស្នេហ៍), produced by Sathen Media.
