= Brandon Vieira =

French kickboxer

- Born: Brandon Vieira; 6 November 1992 (age 33); Roanne, France
- Nationality: French
- Height: 170 cm (5 ft 7 in)
- Division: Super Featherweight
- Stance: Orthodox
- Team: Team NAS-R.K
- Trainer: Nasser Kacem

Kickboxing record
- Total: 70
- Wins: 51
- Losses: 17
- Draws: 2

Brandon Vieira (born 6 November 1992), is the French kickboxer and Muay Thai fighter who has held World Kickboxing Network Super Bantamweight world title under oriental rules earned in 2021, and WKN Super Featherweight world titles in two styles of kickboxing simultaneously (oriental rules and low kick), winning both belts in 2019 outside France within the period of four months. He is of Portuguese descent.

== Career ==
On April 27, 2019 in Rome, Italy Vieira fought Alessandro Morretti for WKN World Super Featherweight title under oriental rules. He won the bout by TKO in the second round.

On July 6, 2019 in Iglesias, Sardinia, Italy Vieira took the fight on a short notice replacing Vasek Sivak, who withdrew due to injury. Riding a three-win streak he challenged two-time WKN European Super Featherweight champion Nicola Canu for WKN World Super Featherweight title in low-kick. He won the fight by a unanimous decision.

On December 18, 2021 in Saint-Fons, France Viera defeated Panomdet of Thailand to become a new WKN World Super Bantamweight champion under oriental rules.

== Titles ==
- 2021 - WKN World Super Bantamweight title (Oriental rules)
- 2019 - WKN World Super Featherweight title (Oriental rules)
- 2019 - WKN World Super Featherweight title (Low kick)

== Fight record ==
Professional Kickboxing Record
51 Wins, 17 Losses, 0 Draw, 0 No Contest
Date	Result	Opponent	Event	Location	Method	Round	Time
2026-06-20	Loss	(Cambodia) Chhut Serey Vannthong	Kun Khmer on Bayon TV	Oyonnax, France	Decision	5	3:00
2023-01-07	Loss	(France) Daren Rolland	Duel en Terre des Farangs 2	Orléans, France	Decision (Unanimous)	3	3:00
2022-12-03	Loss	(Spain) Mario Alavarez	La Nuit des Challenges 21	Saint-Fons, France	Decision (Unanimous)	3	3:00
2022-11-19	Loss	(France) Daren Rolland	Arena Victory	Lille, France	Decision (Unanimous)	3	3:00
2022-06-04	Win	(Thailand) Chutong	Trieste Fight Night	Prosecco, Italy	KO	2	
Wins the MTA -61 kg title.
2022-05-14	Win	(Italy) Michael Oriolo	Generation Fighter 3	Valentigney, France	Decision (Unanimous)	3	3:00
2021-12-18	Win	(Thailand) Zuzu	La Nuit des Challenges 20	Saint-Fons, France	KO	2	
Wins the WKN World -58.5 kg Oriental Rules title.
2021-10-23	Loss	(Vietnam) Nguyen Mahn Hung	Generation Fighter 2	Valentigney, France	Decision (Unanimous)	3	3:00
2021-09-30	Loss	(Italy) Luca Grusovin	MFC 8	Roussillon, France	Decision (Unanimous)	3	3:00
2021-09-29	Win	(Greece) Emmanouil Kallistis	Generation Fighter	Valentigney, France	Decision (Unanimous)	5	3:00
2019-12-14	Win	(Thailand) Kongmuangtai	La Nuit Des Challenges 19	Saint-Fons, France	KO	2	
2019-07-06	Win	(Italy) Nicola Canu	The Night Of Superfight 7	Iglesias, Italy	Decision (Unanimous)	5	3:00
Defends the WKN World -62.1 kg Oriental Rules title.
2019-05-25	Win	(China) Zhou Yingjiang	Oktagon	Monza, Italy	Decision (Unanimous)	3	3:00
2019-04-27	Win	(Italy) Alessandro Moretti	Fighting Spirit 7	Rome, Italy	TKO	2	
Wins the WKN World -62.1 kg Oriental Rules title.
2019-03-16	Win	(Spain) Silviu Vitez	Divonne Muaythai Challenge 4	Divonne-les-Bains, France	Decision (Unanimous)	5	3:00
2018-12-15	Loss	(Thailand) Phetnarin Saktance	La Nuit Des Challenges 18	Saint-Fons, France	TKO	2	
2018-11-09	Draw	(Thailand) Kunponnoi Sitkaewprapon	Best Of Siam 14	Paris, France	Decision (Unanimous)	5	3:00
2018-06-16	Loss	(Cambodia) Kim Dima	Rahu Fight II	Bussy-Saint-Georges, France	Decision (Unanimous)	5	3:00
2018-05-03	Loss	(Thailand) Superbank Sakchaichote	MFC 7	Saint-Priest, France	Decision (Unanimous)	5	3:00
2018-02-24	Win	(France) Arthur Meyer	Fighting Edition	Orchies, France	Decision (Unanimous)	5	3:00
2017-12-16	Win	(United Kingdom) Tam MacCourt	La Nuit Des Challenges 17	Saint-Fons, France	Decision (Unanimous)	5	3:00
2017-06-10	Loss	(France) Arthur Meyer	Hurricane Fighting 4	Châlons-en-Champagne, France	Decision (Majority)	5	3:00
2017-05-03	Win	(Thailand) Yodchai PK SenchaiMuaythaigym	Dubai Fight	Dubai, United Arab Emirates	Decision (Unanimous)	5	3:00
2017-03-09	Win	(Thailand) Leklai	MFC 6	Saint-Priest, France	KO	2	
2016-11-26	Win	(Thailand) Ringrawee Poptheeratham	Millenium World Muaythai	Saint-Denis, France	Decision (Unanimous)	5	3:00
Wins the WPMF International -63.3 kg title.
2016-03-12	Win	(Poland) Pawel Szymansky	Divonne Muay Thai Challenge	Divonne-les-Bains, France	TKO	2	
Legend: Win Loss Draw/No contest Notes
