= Ryan Sheehan =

Irish bantamweight Muay Thai kickboxer

- Born: 30 May 1997 (age 29); Cork, Ireland
- Other names: The Avenger
- Height: 1.69 m (5 ft 6 1/2 in)
- Weight: 55 kg (121 lb; 8 st 9 lb)
- Style: Muay Thai
- Fighting out of: Cork, Ireland
- Team: Siam Warriors
- Trainer: Martin Horgan
- Years active: 2014–present

Kickboxing record
- Total: 39
- Wins: 26
- By knockout: 8
- Losses: 11
- By knockout: 5
- Draws: 2

Ryan Sheehan is an Irish Muay Thai fighter. He is the current WBC Muaythai World Super Bantamweight and ISKA Muay Thai World Bantamweight champion.

== Career ==
Sheehan was scheduled to face Elias Mahmoudi on 11 December 2015 at Best of Siam VII. He lost the fight by unanimous decision.

On 20 February 2016 Sheehan faced Tristan Caetano at Siam Warriors for the ISKA Muay Thai European Bantamweight title. He won the fight by doctor stoppage in the third round to capture the title.

On 15 June 2016 Sheehan travelled to Japan to face the reigning ISKA Muay Thai World Bantamweight champion Shiro at the Shin Nihon Kickboxing Association "WINNERS 2016 2nd" event. The fight was declared a majority draw after 3 rounds.

On 17 February 2017 Sheehan defeated Nestor Rodriguez by unanimous decision at Siam Warriors: Cage Kings.

Sheehan was scheduled to defend his ISKA Muay Thai European title against Steve Irvine at Power of Scotland 24 on 29 April 2017. He successfully defended his title with a win by unanimous decision.

Sheehan challenged Tenshin Nasukawa for his ISKA Oriental rules World Bantamweight title during RISE 117 on 20 May 2017. He was defeated by a body shot KO in the first round.

On 26 August 2017 Sheehan faced Dan McGowan for the vacant ICO World 55 kg title. After a very back and forth fight Sheehan was declared the loser by unanimous decision.

Sheehan was scheduled to face Thepnimit Sitmonchai on 3 February 2018 at Siam Warriors Superfights. After back and forth action, the fight was declared a draw. Following this result Sheehan stepped away from the sport for a year.

Sheehan was scheduled to face future WBC Muay Thai World Featherweight champion Daren Rolland for the WBC Muaythai International Featherweight title on 16 February 2019. He lost the fight by TKO in the third round.

On 19 October 2019 Sheehan was scheduled to face Andrei Mezentsev for the ISKA Muay Thai World Flyweight title at a Siam Warriors event. Sheehan lost the fight by split decision.

On 8 March 2020 Sheehan faced Klairung Sasiprapa at Capital 1 for the WBC Muay Thai International Super Bantamweight title. He won the fight by knockout in the third round.

On 23 April 2022 Sheehan faced Jomhod Eminentair at Siam Warriors for the ISKA Muay Thai World Bantamweight title and the WBC Muay Thai World Super Bantamweight title. He won the fight by split decision and captured both titles.

Sheehan faced Sam-A Gaiyanghadao on 17 March 2023, at ONE Friday Fights 9. He lost the fight via knockout in the second round.

== Titles and accomplishments ==
- World Boxing Council Muaythai
  - 2020 WBC Muay Thai International Super Bantamweight Champion
  - 2022 WBC Muay Thai World Super Bantamweight Champion
  - 2025 WBC Muay Thai European Flyweight Champion

International Sport Kickboxing Association

  - 2014 ISKA Muay Thai Irish Flyweight Champion
  - 2016 ISKA Muay Thai European Bantwamweight Champion (One defense)
  - 2022 ISKA Muay Thai World Bantamweight Champion
- World Kickboxing Association
  - 2016 WKA Muay Thai World Bantamweight Champion

== Fight record ==
Professional Muay Thai Record
26 Wins (8 (T)KOs), 11 Losses, 2 Draws, 0 No Contest
| Date | Result | Opponent | Event | Location | Method | Round | Time |
| 2025-06-28 | Loss | (Thailand) Petchsila Wor.Auracha | TOPKING Europe Series | London, England | KO (Left cross) | 2 | |
For the vacant WMO World Super Bantamweight title.
| 2024-10-12 | Loss | (Australia) Corey Nicholson | Honour Premier League | Fortitude Valley, Australia | KO (Right cross) | 2 | |
Loses the ISKA Muay Thai World Bantamweight title.
| 2023-03-17 | Loss | (Thailand) Sam-A Gaiyanghadao | ONE Friday Fights 9 | Bangkok, Thailand | KO (Left cross) | 2 | 2:52 |
| 2022-04-23 | Win | (Thailand) Jomhod Eminentair | Siam Warriors | Cork City, Ireland | Decision (Split) | 5 | 3:00 |
Wins the vacant ISKA Muay Thai World Bantamweight and WBC Muay Thai World Super Bantamweight titles.
| 2020-03-08 | Win | (Thailand) Klairung Sasiprapa | Capital 1 | Dublin, Ireland | KO (Left hook) | 2 | |
Wins WBC Muay Thai International Super Bantamweight title.
| 2019-10-19 | Loss | (Ukraine) Andrei Mezentsev | Siam Warriors Superfights | Cork, Ireland | Decision (Split) | 5 | 3:00 |
For the ISKA Muay Thai World Flyweight title.
| 2019-07-20 | Win | (Republic of Ireland) Jay Counsel | Siam Warriors Superfights: Leeside Revolution | Cork, Ireland | Decision (Unanimous) | 5 | 3:00 |
| 2019-02-16 | Loss | (France) Daren Rolland | Rumble at the Rockies | Cork, Ireland | TKO (Punches) | 3 | |
For the WBC Muaythai International Featherweight title.
| 2018-02-03 | Draw | (Thailand) Thepnimit Sitmonchai | Siam Warriors Superfight | Cork, Ireland | Decision | 5 | 3:00 |
| 2017-11-24 | Loss | (England) Jamie Whelan | Kickboxing Grand Prix | Baghdad, Iraq | TKO | 2 | |
For the KGP World Super Featherweight title.
| 2017-08-26 | Loss | (England) Dan McGowan | Muay Thai World Class Action | Birmingham, England | Decision (Unanimous) | 5 | 3:00 |
For the ICO World −55kg title.
| 2017-05-20 | Loss | (Japan) Tenshin Nasukawa | RISE 117 | Tokyo, Japan | KO (left hook to the body) | 1 | 1:12 |
For the ISKA Oriental rules World Bantamweight title.
| 2017-04-29 | Win | (Scotland) Steve Irvine | Power of Scotland 24 | United Kingdom | Decision (Unanimous) | 5 | 3:00 |
Defends ISKA Muay Thai European Bantamweight title.
| 2017-02-18 | Win | (Spain) Nestor Rodriguez | Siam Warriors: Cage Kings | Cork, Ireland | Decision (Unanimous) | 5 | 3:00 |
| 2016-10-22 | Win | (Japan) Hiroyuki | Siam Warriors Superfights: Ireland vs Japan | Ireland | Decision (Unanimous) | 5 | 3:00 |
Wins the vacant WKA Muay Thai World Bantamweight title.
| 2016-05-28 | Win | (Ukraine) Vyorel Vintu | Wolf of the Ring | Milan, Italy | Decision | | |
| 2016-05-15 | Draw | (Japan) Shiro | SNKA WINNERS 2016 2nd | Tokyo, Japan | Decision (Majority) | 3 | 3:00 |
| 2016-02-20 | Win | (France) Tristan Caetano | Siam Warriors Muay Thai Supershow | Cork, Ireland | TKO (Doctor stoppage) | 2 | |
Wins ISKA Muay Thai European Bantamweight title.
| 2015-12-11 | Loss | (Algeria) Elias Mahmoudi | Best Of Siam 7 | Paris, France | Decision (Unanimous) | 5 | 3:00 |
| 2015-10-17 | Win | (Republic of Ireland) Aaron McGahey | Cage Kings 3 | Cork, Ireland | TKO | 1 | |
Wins Cage Kings title.
| 2015-02-22 | Win | (Belgium) Deniz Demirkapu | Siam Warriors | Cork, Ireland | Decision (Unanimous) | 5 | 2:00 |
| 2014-09-06 | Loss | (United Kingdom) Kai Laithwaithe | Smash 10 | Liverpool, England | Decision (Unanimous) | 5 | 1:30 |
| 2014-08-16 | Win | (Republic of Ireland) Keith Wall | Siam Warriors | Cork, Ireland | | | |
| 2014– | Win | Kane Smith | | Cork, Ireland | Decision | 5 | 1:30 |
Wins ISKA Muay Thai Irish Flyweight title.
Legend: Win Loss Draw/No contest Notes

== See also ==
- List of male kickboxers
