= Daniel McGowan (Muay Thai) =

British Muay Thai fighter

- Born: 1996 (age 29–30); Luton, England
- Other names: Daniel Petchyindee
- Nationality: (United Kingdom) British
- Height: 168 cm (5 ft 6 in)
- Weight: 56 kg (123 lb; 8.8 st)
- Style: Muay Thai
- Fighting out of: London, England
- Team: Evolve MMA

Kickboxing record
- Total: 40
- Wins: 34
- By knockout: 6
- Losses: 5
- By knockout: 2
- Draws: 1

Daniel McGowan is a British Muay Thai fighter.

== Biography and career ==
McGowan started Muay Thai training at 11 years old after trying Tae Kwon Do and Kickboxing. He was one of the youngest non thai to fight at the Rajadamnern Stadium at 15 years old promoted by Petchyindee, he spends time at their academy regularly since that fight.

On January 10, 2016, at SNKA WINNERS 2016 McGowan faced Shiro for the ISKA World Muay Thai Bantamweight title. He lost the fight by a unanimous decision.

On August 26, 2017, McGowan faced Ryan Sheehan for the vacant ICO World 55 kg title. After a very back and forth fight McGowan was declared the winner by unanimous decision.

McGowan became a force to be reckoned with when he knocked out multiple weights stadium champion Rungnarai Kiatmuu9 at YOKKAO in October 2017. This win opened him for big fights in Thailand where two months later he beat Thanadej Thor.Pran49 but injured his hand in the process.

Mcgowan made his comeback in September 2018, he knocked out Saengmorakot Sakphinyo with an elbow on the televised portion of an event at Rajadamnern Stadium. Two months later he beat Ratanaphon Nor.Anuwatgym but injured his hand again and had multiple surgeries which took him out of competition for multiple years.

Mcgowan made his return to competition after 3 years of hiatus on March 26, 2022, at Combat Fight Series 7. He faced Mario Alvarez for the ISKA Muay Thai Intercontinental 67 kg title. He lost the fight by knockout in the third round.

== Titles and accomplishments ==
=== Amateur ===
- 47 kg WRSA World Champion
- 49 kg GBMA World Champion
- 51 kg WRSA World Champion

=== Professional ===
- Muay Thai Grand Prix
  - 2016 MTGP Bantamweight Champion
- International Combat Organisation
  - 2017 ICO World -55 kg Champion

== Muay Thai record ==
Professional Muay Thai Record
35 Wins (6 (T)KO's), 7 Losses, 1 Draw, 0 No Contest
Date	Result	Opponent	Event	Location	Method	Round	Time
2023-04-23	Loss	(France) Daren Rolland	Hitman Fight League	London, England	KO (Knee to the body)	3	
For the vacant WMO International featherweight (-57.5kg) title.
2022-11-20	Win	(Spain) Sandro Martin	Combat Fight Series	London, England	Decision (Unanimous)	3	3:00
2022-03-26	Loss	(Spain) Mario Alvarez	Combat Fight Series 7	London, England	KO (Knee to the body)	3	2:15
For the ISKA Muay Thai Intercontinental -57kg title.
2018-11-30	Win	(Thailand) Ratanaphon Nor.Anuwatgym	True4U	Thailand	Decision	5	3:00
2018-09-25	Win	(Thailand) Saengmorakot Sakphinyo	Rajadamnern Stadium	Bangkok, Thailand	KO (Right elbow)	3	
2017-12-08	Win	(Thailand) Thanadet Thor.Pran49	True4U Rangsit Stadium	Rangsit, Thailand	Decision	5	3:00
2017-10-15	Win	(Thailand) Rungnarai Kiatmuu9	YOKKAO 28	Bolton, England	KO (Left Hook)	3	2:05
2017-08-26	Win	(Republic of Ireland) Ryan Sheehan	Muay Thaï World Class Action	Birmingham, England	Decision (Unanimous)	5	3:00
Wins ICO World -55kg title.
2016-08-07	Loss	(Thailand) Ja Kiatphontip		United Kingdom	Decision	5	3:00
For the ICO World -57kg title.
2016-06-11	Win	(France) Renaud Gurgui-Halsdorff	Muay Thai Grand Prix 5	London, England	TKO (Referee Stoppage)	2	1:45
Wins MTGP Bantamweight title.
2016-03-26	Win	(United States) Victor Saravia	Muay Thai Grand Prix 3	London, England	TKO (Doctor Stoppage/Elbow)	2	
2016-01-10	Loss	(Japan) Shiro	SNKA WINNERS 2016	Tokyo, Japan	Decision (Unanimous)	5	3:00
For the ISKA World Muay Thai Bantamweight title.
2015-11-22	Win	(Spain) Adrian Lopez	Muay Thai Grand Prix 2	United Kingdom	Decision	5	3:00
2015-07-31	Loss	(United States) Romie Adanza	Lion Fight 23	United States	TKO (Doctor Stoppage/Elbow)	3	2:10
2015-06-20	Win	(Belgium) Burak Illgin	Muay Thai Grand Prix 1	United Kingdom	Disqualification	2	3:00
2015-01-25	Loss	(Thailand) Kongfak Sor. Chairoth	Rangsit Stadium	Rangsit, Thailand	KO (Straight right)	2	
2014-12-17	Win	(Thailand) Daodang Boribhatburirum	Rajadamnern Stadium	Bangkok, Thailand	Decision	5	3:00
2014-10-11	Win	(Spain) Nestor Rodriguez	YOKKAO 11	Bolton, England	Decision	5	3:00
2014-08-30	Win	(Portugal) Rui Botelho	Fighting Machines	United Kingdom	Decision	5	3:00
2014-07-05	Win	(United Kingdom) Paulo Da Silva	Smash Muay Thai 9	Watford, England	Decision	5	3:00
2014-05-03	Win	(Scotland) Kieran McAskill	Power of Scotland	Scotland	Decision	5	3:00
2014-03-08	Win	(Scotland) Jordan Coe	YOKKAO 8	Bolton, England	Decision	5	3:00
2013-12-05	Win	(Thailand) Wansongkram Phanukut	Muay Thai Warriors	Bangkok, Thailand	Decision	5	3:00
2013-08-17	Win	(Scotland) Jason Dick	HGH	United Kingdom	KO (Left hook to the body)	4	
2013	Win	(United Kingdom) Reece Thomson		United Kingdom			
2013-04-06	Win	(Thailand) Masimok Sitkrupak	Lumpinee Stadium	Bangkok, Thailand	Decision	5	3:00
2013-02-23	Win	(Thailand) Fahthai Mor Watanachai	Lumpinee Stadium	Bangkok, Thailand	Decision	5	3:00
2012-11-02	Win	(Thailand) Phalangpetch	Lumpinee Stadium	Bangkok, Thailand	Decision	5	3:00
2012-08-12	Win	(Thailand) Thai Rompo Gym	Rajadamnern Stadium	Bangkok, Thailand	KO (Sweep to head kick)	4	
2012-07-20	Loss	(Thailand) Insee Sirinthip	Muay Thai Warriors	Thailand	Decision	5	3:00
2012-02-11	Win	(Thailand)		Thailand	Decision	5	3:00
2011-04	Win	(Thailand)	Rajadamnern Stadium	Bangkok, Thailand	Decision	5	3:00
Legend: Win Loss Draw/No contest Notes
