= Frederico Cordeiro =

Portuguese kickboxer (born 1995)

- Born: 30 September 1995 (age 31); Portugal
- Other names: The Joker; Dono do mundo
- Nationality: Portuguese
- Height: 1.61 m (5 ft 3 1/2 in)
- Weight: 55 kg (121 lb; 8.7 st)
- Style: Kickboxing
- Fighting out of: Lisbon, Portugal
- Team: Dinamite Team

Kickboxing record
- Total: 49
- Wins: 41
- By knockout: 26
- Losses: 8

Mixed martial arts record
- Total: 1
- Losses: 1

Other information
- Boxing record from BoxRec

Fred Cordeiro is a Portuguese kickboxer and mixed martial artist.

== Championships and accomplishments ==
Amateur

- Portugal Kickboxing Federation
  - 2011 National Championship K-1 Junior (class C) -54 kg Runner-up
  - 2012 National Cup Low Kick Junior (class C) -54 kg Champion
  - 2x National Championship Low Kick Junior (class C) -57 kg Champion (2012, 2013)
  - 2014 National Championship Low Kick Senior (class B) -57 kg Champion
  - 2x Athlete of the Year (2013-2014)
- World Association of Kickboxing Organizations
  - 2013 WAKO European Championship Low Kick Junior (C-class) -57 kg (gold)
  - 2014 WAKO World Championship Low Kick Junior (C-class) -57 kg (silver)

Professional

- DUEL Fight Sports
  - 2015 DUEL Superfight Bantamweight Champion
  - 2015 DUEL Superfight Lightweight Champion
- World Kickboxing League
  - 2016 WKL European -61 kg Champion
- World Kickboxing Association
  - 2018 WKA World -55 kg Champion
- International Professional Combat Council
  - 2019 IPCC Europe -60 kg Champion
- International Sport Kickboxing Association
  - 2021 ISKA Muay Thai Europe -55 kg Champion
  - 2023 ISKA K-1 World -55 kg Champion

== Mixed martial arts record ==
Professional record breakdown
1 match	0 wins	1 loss
By decision	0	1

Res.	Record	Opponent	Method	Event	Date	Round	Time	Location	Notes
Loss	0–1	Vitor Oliveira	Decision (unanimous)	Supreme Challenge 5	November 29, 2025	3	5:00	Almada, Portugal	

=== Mixed martial arts exhibition record ===
Exhibition record breakdown		
1 match	1 win	0 losses
By knockout	1	0

Res.	Record	Opponent	Method	Event	Date	Round	Time	Location	Notes
Win	1–0	Carlos Rocha	KO (spinning back kick)	Fusion Fight League 4	November 30, 2024	2	2:51	Lagos, Portugal	Flyweight debut

== Kickboxing record ==
Professional Kickboxing & Muay Thai Record
16 Wins (12 (T)KO's), 5 Losses, 0 Draw, 0 No Contest
Date	Result	Opponent	Event	Location	Method	Round	Time
2023-03-25	Win	(United Kingdom) Jordan Swinton	Combat Fight Series 12	London, England	KO (Right hook)	5	
Wins the vacant ISKA K-1 World -55kg title.
2022-02-05	Loss	(Romania) Silviu Vitez	HMF Custom Fighters	Madrid, Spain	Decision	3	3:00
2021-12-01	Win	(France) Renaud Gurgui	Diamond League	Lisbon, Portugal	KO (Left Hook)	2	
2021-04-24	Win	(Spain) Mikel Fernandez	Mamba Fight Club Showdown 011	Ponferrada, Spain	KO (Left Cross)	1	
Wins ISKA Muay Thai Europe -55kg title.
2020-01-11	Loss	(China) Zhao Chongyang	Wu Lin Feng 2020: WLF World Cup 2019-2020 Final	Zhuhai, China	Decision (Unanimous)	3	3:00
2019-12-07	Win	(Germany) Massi Rahimi	Pegasus Fight	Switzerland	Decision	5	3:00
Wins the IPCC Europe -60kg title.
2019-11-09	Win	(Portugal) Joao Goncalves	Strikers League	Carcavelos, Portugal	KO (Right Hook)	1	1:30
2019-10-05	Loss	(Algeria) Akram Hamidi	Kings Of Muay Thai	Luxembourg, Luxembourg	Decision (Unanimous)	5	3:00
For the WBC Muaythai International Bantamweight title.
2019-05-04	Win	(Spain) Xavi Vizcaino	Heroes Night 10	Spain	KO	1	
2019-03-10	Loss	(Thailand) Rungkit Wor.Sanprapai	Rise World Series 2019 First Round	Tokyo, Japan	Decision (Unanimous)	3	3:00
2018-11-25	Win	(Spain) Davicillo Lahm	Invencibles VIII	Getafe, Spain	KO (Left Hook)	1	
Wins WKA World -55kg title.
2018-10-13	Win	(France) Sofiane Meddar	Nuit de l'Uppercut 3	France	Decision (Unanimous)	3	3:00
2018-05-05	Win	(France) Darren Rolland	Phenix Boxing Only - Edition 6	Saint-Julien-en-Genevois, France	Decision (Unanimous)	3	3:00
2018-01-27	Win	(Spain) Alejandro Rivas	Brothers League VII	Portugal	Decision	3	3:00
2016-04-09	Win	(England) Gary Laws	DUEL 6	Newcastle, England	KO (Spinning back kick)	3	
Defends DUEL Lightweight title and wins WKL European title.
2016-03-26	Loss	(Japan) Tenshin Nasukawa	RISE 110	Tokyo, Japan	Decision (unanimous)	5	3:00
For the vacant ISKA Oriental Rules Bantamweight (55 kg) World Title.
2015-12-12	Win	(Ukraine) Roman Skulskyi	Diamond League	Lisbon, Portugal	KO	2	
2015-11-28	Win	(United Kingdom) Ross Cochrane	Headhunters	Grangemouth, Scotland	KO (Right Hook)	1	
2015-09-27	Win	(England) John Spencer	DUEL 5	Newcastle, England	KO (Low Kick)	1	
Defends DUEL Lightweight title.
2015-03-21	Win	(United Kingdom) Connor Long	DUEL 4	Newcastle, England	KO (Right Cross)	2	
Wins DUEL Bantamweight title.
2014-11-08	Win	(United Kingdom) Andy Hughes	DUEL 3	Newcastle, England	KO (Knee to the Head)	1	
Wins DUEL Lightweight title.
Legend: Win Loss Draw/No contest Notes

Amateur Kickboxing Record
Date	Result	Opponent	Event	Location	Method	Round	Time
2016-09-24	Loss	(Finland) Lawrence Korede	WAKO K-1 European Cup, -60 kg Tournament 1/8 Final	Prague, Czech Republic	Decision (Split)		
2016-03-05	Loss	(Italy) Daniele Panetta	WAKO Irish open, Full Contact -57 kg Semi Final	Dublin, Ireland	Decision (Majority)		
2016-03-04	Win	(Norway) Firouzadeh Said Shahwali	WAKO Irish open, Full Contact -57 kg Quarter Final	Dublin, Ireland	Decision (Unanimous)		
2014-10-18	Win	(Georgia (country)) Jaba Memishishi	WAKO European Championship, Low Kick -57 kg Tournament Quarter Final	Bilbao, Spain	Decision (Split)		
2014-09-	Loss	(Russia) Aleksandr Borisov	WAKO Junior World Championship 2014, Low Kick -57 kg Tournament Final	Rimini, Italy	Decision		
For the WAKO World Championship Low Kick -57kg title.
2014-09-	Win	(Croatia) Muhamet Deskaj	WAKO Junior World Championship 2014, Low Kick -57 kg Tournament Semi Final	Rimini, Italy	Decision		
2014-09-	Win	(Slovakia) Filip Halaj	WAKO Junior World Championship 2014, Low Kick -57 kg Tournament Quarter Final	Rimini, Italy	Decision		
2014-09-	Win	(Spain) Jon Sarasketa	WAKO Junior World Championship 2014, Low Kick -57 kg Tournament 1/8 Final	Rimini, Italy	Decision		
2013-09-	Win	(Azerbaijan) Zhorab Azimov	WAKO European Championship Junior, Low Kick -57 kg Tournament Final	Poland	Decision		
Wins WAKO Low Kick European Championship Junior -57kg title.
2013-09-	Win	(Russia) Timur Musaev	WAKO European Championship Junior, Low Kick -57 kg Tournament Semi Final	Poland	Decision		
2013-09-14	Win	(Belarus) Ivanou Uladzislau	WAKO European Championship Junior, Low Kick -57 kg Tournament Quarter Final	Poland	Decision		
Legend: Win Loss Draw/No contest Notes

== Professional boxing record ==
1 fight	0 wins	1 loss
By knockout	0	1

No.	Result	Record	Opponent	Type	Round, time	Date	Location	Notes
1	Loss	0–1	(Romania) Ionuţ Băluţă	TKO	5 (6)	2 Jun 2017	Pabellón Padre Diego, Palencia, Spain	

== See also ==
- List of male kickboxers
