= Akram Hamidi =

French-Algerian kickboxer

- Born: 4 January 1999 (age 27); Strasbourg, France
- Other names: Le Pepite
- Height: 1.70 m (5 ft 7 in)
- Weight: 55 kg (121 lb; 8 st 9 lb)
- Division: Bantamweight
- Style: Muay Thai, Kickboxing
- Team: Elite boxing 67
- Trainer: Steeve Valente
- Years active: 2015 – present

Professional boxing record
- Total: 1
- Wins: 1
- By knockout: 0
- Losses: 0

Kickboxing record
- Total: 41
- Wins: 35
- By knockout: 22
- Losses: 5
- By knockout: 2
- Draws: 1

Akram Hamidi (born 4 January 1999) is a French-Algerian kickboxer and muay thai fighter. He is the current ISKA World K-1 rules flyweight champion and the former WKN European and WBC Muaythai International Bantamweight champion.

As of January 2023, Beyond Kickboxing ranks him as the seventh best super flyweight (−55 kg) kickboxer in the world.

== Kickboxing/Muay thai career ==
=== Early career ===
Hamidi made his step up from the juniors on 24 October 2015, as he was booked to face Valentin Thibault in a B-class match up at King of Muay Thai. He lost the fight by split decision. After earning another B-class victory eight months later, a first round stoppage of Mehdi Cheloum at La Nuit Des Spartiates V on 18 June 2016, Hamidi was booked to face Mouhssin Chouhik at Nuit Des Guerriers 2 on 11 February 2017, in what was his professional debut. He won the fight by a career-first unanimous decision.

Hamidi was expected to face Steven Mendy at Kings of Muay Thai on 11 March 2017. The fight was later cancelled on the day of the weigh-ins, as Mendy weighed-in at 57 kilograms, 1.5 kilograms above the agreed-upon limit. Hamidi faced Bestar Thaqi at Fighters 3 – The Way of the Champions on 3 June 2017. He won the fight by a third-round knockout.

Hamidi was booked to face Khalil Kacimi for the AFMT Bantamweight (−53.5 kg) title at Hurricane Fighting 4 on 10 June 2017. He won the vacant title by technical knockout, after knocking his opponent down three times in the third round.

After capturing his first professional title, Hamidi went on a four-fight winning streak. He beat Hamza Merdi by unanimous decision at Show Thai 17 on 30 June 2017, Sitpooyaiae Mangkonthep by a first-round knockout at the 13 August 2017, Max Muaythai event, Darren Rolland at Shock Muay 9 on 14 October 2017, and Nong Rose at Kerner Thai on 6 January 2018.

Following his initial success, Hamidi would then go on a cold streak. He first lost a rematch with Darren Rolland by unanimous decision at TEK Fight on 3 March 2018, which was followed by a draw with Rui Botelho at Radikal Fight Night Silver on 14 April 2018, and a decision victory over Emanuele Tetti Menichelli at Hurricane Fighting 5 on 2 June 2018. His bad form was capped of by a first-round knockout loss to Yoshiki Takei at K-1 World GP 2018: inaugural Cruiserweight Championship Tournament on 24 September 2018, which was the first stoppage loss of his career up to that point.

=== ISKA Flyweight champion ===
Hamidi faced Samuele Andolina for the WKN European Bantamweight (−53.5 kg) title at Championnat d'Europe WKN K-1 Rules on 1 December 2018. He won the fight by a second-round technical knockout. Hamidi next faced Frederico Cordeiro for the WBC Muaythai International Bantamweight (−53.5 kg) title at Kings of Muay Thai on 5 October 2019. He won the fight by a unanimous decision. Hamidi faced Sandro Martin for the ISKA World Flyweight (−53.5 kg) K-1 title at Ultimate Muaythai K1 Rules on 30 November 2019, in what was his fourth professional title bout. He won the fight by a second-round knockout.

He made his first ISKA World K-1 flyweight title defense against Samvel Babayan at Ultimate Muaythai K-1 Rules on 20 November 2021. He retained the title by decision. Hamidi would then go on to win three non-title bouts. He first faced Gonzalo Tebar at Empire Fight on 8 February 2020, whom he beat by unanimous decision. He then beat Abdulvosid Buranov by a first-round knockout at MuayThai Night 6 on 25 June 2021, and Abdel Cherragi by unanimous decision at Empire Fight – Vikings Edition on 2 October 2021.

Hamidi faced Ruben Soane in the main event of Dhee Sok Battle on 16 April 2022. He lost the fight by majority decision.

On 13 September 2022, it was revealed that Hamidi would fight at the Ultimate Muay Thaï K-1 Rules 5 on 19 November, against an opponent which would be announced at a latter date. On 25 October, it was announced that Hamidi would make his second ISKA flyweight title defense against the K-1 veteran Kazuki Fujita. In front of a crowd of 2,000 spectators, Hamidi retained the title by a fourth-round knockout.

Hamidi faced Giacomo D'Aquino at Boxing Fighters System Event 3 on 4 February 2023. He won the fight by a second-round knockout. Hamidi next faced Franck Gross at Le Choc des Etoiles 7 on 13 May 2023. He won the fight by a second-round knockout.

=== ONE Championship ===
Hamidi was expected to face Mehdi El Jamari at Les Champions du Monde de Kickboxing on 15 June 2023. The bout fell through for undisclosed reasons and Hamidi was rescheduled to face Jomhod Eminentair at ONE Friday Fights 22 on 23 June 2023. He won the fight by a second-round knockout.

Hamidi is scheduled to face the interim ONE Strawweight Muay Thai World Champion Prajanchai P.K.Saenchaimuaythaigym in a kickboxing bout at ONE Friday Fights 34 on 23 September 2023. He lost the fight by unanimous decision.

Hamidi faced Amornchai for the vacant WKN K-1 World Flyweight −54.9 kg title at Ultimate Muay Thai K1 6 on 18 November 2023. He won the fight by a first-round knockout.

Hamidi made his first WKN K-1 World Flyweight title defense against Duk Jae Yoon at BFS Event 4 on 9 March 2024. He won the fight by unanimous decision.

Hamidi faced Petchartchai FightGeekMuaythai at Fearless Fighting Championship on 4 May 2023. He won via head kick knockout in the first round.

Hamidi faced Kongchai Chanaidonmuang at ONE Friday Fights 66 on 8 June 2024. He won the fight by a first-round technical knockout.

Hamidi faced Sam-A Gaiyanghadao at ONE Friday Fights 81 on 27 September 2024. He lost the fight by a first-round knockout.

== Professional boxing career ==
Hamidi made his boxing debut against Jean Christophe Gomis at Kernfightwerk on 1 October 2022. He won the fight by unanimous decision.

== Championships and accomplishments ==
=== Professional ===
- Académie Française de Muay Thaï
  - 2017 AFMT Bantamweight (−53.5 kg) Championship
- World Kickboxing Network
  - 2018 WKN European Oriental Rules Bantamweight (−53.5 kg) Championship
  - 2023 WKN World K-1 Flyweight −54.9 kg Championship
    - Two successful title defenses
- World Boxing Council Muaythai
  - 2019 WBC Muaythai International Bantamweight (−53.5 kg) Championship
- International Sport Karate Association
  - 2019 ISKA World Flyweight (−53.5 kg) K-1 Championship
    - Two successful title defenses
- Phenix Muay Thai
  - 2022 Phenix Muay Thai K-1 Rules −54 kg Championship
- ONE Championship
  - Performance of the Night (vs. Jomhod Eminentair)

=== Amateur ===
- World Muaythai Federation
  - (gold) 2017 WMF European Junior Championships (−54 kg)
- International Federation of Muaythai Associations
  - (gold) 2022 IFMA European Championships (−54 kg)

== Fight record ==
Professional Muay Thai & kickboxing record
35 wins (22 (T)KOs), 5 losses, 1 draw, 0 no contests
Date	Result	Opponent	Event	Location	Method	Round	Time
2026-10-30	Win	(Thailand) Numsurin Chor.Ketwina	ONE The Inner Circle 36, Lumpinee Stadium	Bangkok, Thailand	KO (body punches)	1	1:58
2026-07-31	Win	(Thailand) Watcharaphon Laochokcharoen	ONE Friday Fights 164, Lumpinee Stadium	Bangkok, Thailand	Decision (unanimous)	3	3:00
2025-11-22	Win	(Cambodia) Kam Menghong	Ultimate Muay Thai K1 8	Strasbourg, France	KO (knee to the body)	1	
Defends the WKN K-1 World Flyweight −54.9 kg title.
2024-09-27	Loss	(Thailand) Sam-A Gaiyanghadao	ONE Friday Fights 81, Lumpinee Stadium	Bangkok, Thailand	KO (left cross)	1	1:22
2024-06-08	Win	(Thailand) Kongchai Chanaidonmuang	ONE Friday Fights 66, Lumpinee Stadium	Bangkok, Thailand	TKO (punches)	1	1:41
2024-05-04	Win	(Thailand) Petchartchai FightGeekMuaythai	Fearless Fighting Championship	France	KO (high kick)	1	0:24
2024-03-09	Win	(South Korea) Duk Jae Yoon	BFS Event 4	Nîmes, France	Decision (unanimous)	5	3:00
Defends the WKN K-1 World Flyweight −54.9 kg title.
2023-11-18	Win	(Thailand) Amornchai	Ultimate Muay Thai K1 6	Strasbourg, France	KO (right cross)	1	0:41
Wins the vacant WKN K-1 World Flyweight −54.9 kg title.
2023-09-23	Loss	(Thailand) Prajanchai P.K.Saenchaimuaythaigym	ONE Friday Fights 34, Lumpinee Stadium	Bangkok, Thailand	Decision (unanimous)	3	3:00
2023-06-23	Win	(Thailand) Jomhod Eminentair	ONE Friday Fights 22, Lumpinee Stadium	Bangkok, Thailand	TKO (left hook to the body)	2	0:36
2023-05-13	Win	(France) Franck Gross	Le Choc des Etoiles 7	Châteauneuf-les-Martigues, France	KO (knee to the body)	2	2:14
2023-02-04	Win	(Italy) Giacomo D'Aquino	Boxing Fighters System Event 3	Nîmes, France	KO (knee to the body)	2	
2022-11-19	Win	(Japan) Kazuki Fujita	Ultimate Muay Thai K1 5	Paris, France	KO (knee to the head)	4	2:05
Defends the ISKA K-1 World Flyweight (−53.5 kg) title.
2022-06-11	Win	(Armenia) Samvel Babayan	Phenix Muay Thai 13	Trets, France	Decision	3	3:00
Wins the Phenix Muay Thai K-1 Rules −54kg title.
2022-04-16	Loss	(Spain) Ruben Seoane	Dhee Sok Battle	Reims, France	Decision (majority)	5	3:00
2021-11-20	Win	(Armenia) Samvel Babayan	Ultimate Muaythai K-1 Rules	Strasbourg, France	Decision (unanimous)	5	3:00
Defends the ISKA K-1 World Flyweight (−53.5 kg) title.
2021-10-02	Win	(Morocco) Abdel Cherragi	Empire Fight – Vikings Edition	Montbéliard, France	Decision (unanimous)	3	3:00
2021-06-25	Win	(Russia) Abdulvosid Buranov	MuayThai Night 6	Abu Dhabi	KO (low kicks)	2	0:47
2020-02-08	Win	(Spain) Gonzalo Tebar	Empire Fight	Montbéliard, France	Decision (unanimous)	3	3:00
2019-11-30	Win	(Spain) Sandro Martin	Ultimate Muaythai K1 Rules	Strasbourg, France	KO (right straight)	2	0:57
Wins the ISKA K-1 World Flyweight (−53.5 kg) title.
2019-10-05	Win	(Portugal) Frederico Cordeiro	Kings of Muay Thai	Luxembourg, Luxembourg	Decision (unanimous)	5	3:00
Wins the WBC Muaythai International Bantamweight (−53.5 kg) title.
2019-05-18	Win	(Italy) Flavio Scrimali	Muay Thai Show 2	Kehl, Germany	KO (right knee)	2	1:32
2019-02-02	Win	(Italy) Mike Astarita	Lion Belt 6	Nancy, France	Decision (unanimous)	3	3:00
2018-12-01	Win	(Malta) Samuele Andolina	Championnat d'Europe WKN K-1 Rules	Strasbourg, France	TKO (punches and kicks)	2	2:03
Wins the WKN European Bantamweight (−53.5 kg) title.
2018-09-24	Loss	(Japan) Yoshiki Takei	K-1 World GP 2018: inaugural Cruiserweight Championship Tournament	Saitama, Japan	TKO (punches)	1	1:41
2018-06-02	Win	(Italy) Emanuele Tetti Menichelli	Hurricane Fighting 5	Châlons-en-Champagne, France	Decision (unanimous)	3	3:00
2018-04-14	Draw	(Portugal) Rui Botelho	Radikal Fight Night Silver	Charleville-Mézières, France	Decision (unanimous)	3	3:00
2018-03-03	Loss	(France) Darren Rolland	TEK Fight	Meaux, France	Decision (unanimous)	3	3:00
2018-01-06	Win	(Thailand) Nong Rose Banjaroensuk	Kerner Thai	Paris, France	Decision (unanimous)	3	3:00
2017-10-14	Win	(France) Darren Rolland	Shock Muay 9	Saint-Denis, France	Decision (unanimous)	3	3:00
2017-08-13	Win	(Thailand) Mangkonthep Sitpooyaiae	Max Muay Thai	Pattaya, Thailand	KO	1	
2017-06-30	Win	(Morocco) Hamza Merdi	Show Thai 17	Aubervilliers, France	Decision (unanimous)	3	3:00
2017-06-10	Win	(France) Khalil Kacimi	Hurricane Fighting 4	Châlons-en-Champagne, France	TKO (three knockdowns)	3	
Wins the vacant AFMT Bantamweight (−53.5 kg) title.
2017-06-03	Win	(Germany) Bestar Thaqi	Fighters 3 – The Way of the Champions	Oberkorn, Luxembourg	KO	3	
2017-02-11	Win	(France) Mouhssin Chouhik	Nuit Des Guerriers 2	Pont-à-Mousson, France	Decision (unanimous)	3	3:00
2016-06-18	Win	(Morocco) Mehdi Cheloum	La Nuit Des Spartiates V	Sarreguemines, France	KO (knee to the body)	1	0:52
Legend: Win Loss Draw/no contest Notes

Amateur Muay Thai record
Date	Result	Opponent	Event	Location	Method	Round	Time
2022-02-20	Win	(Cyprus) Stefanos Sotiriou	IFMA European Championships 2022, Final	Istanbul, Turkey	Decision	3	
Wins the 2022 IFMA European Championships Gold Medal (−54 kg).
2022-02-19	Win	(Sweden) Giang Hoang	IFMA European Championships 2022, Semifinal	Istanbul, Turkey	Decision	3	
2022-02-17	Win	(Russia) Abdulla Magomedov	IFMA European Championships 2022, Quarterfinal	Istanbul, Turkey	Decision	3	
2019-07-26	Loss	(Kazakhstan) Yelaman Sayassatov	IFMA World Championships 2019, Quarter Final	Bangkok, Thailand	Decision (29–28)	3	
2019-07-24	Win	(Belarus) Vitali Ramanouski	IFMA World Championships 2019, 1/8 Final	Bangkok, Thailand	Decision (29:28)	3	
2017-12-04	Win	(Russia)	WMF European Junior Championships 2017, Final	Minsk, Belarus	Decision	3	
Wins the 2017 WMF European Junior Championships Gold Medal (−54 kg).
2015-07-03	Win	(France) Kenzo Fabianelli	Emperor Chok Dee: Young Battle	Vandœuvre-lès-Nancy, France	Decision (30:27)	3	2:00
2015-10-24	Loss	(France) Valentin Thibault	King of Muay Thai	Luxembourg	Decision (split)	5	3:00
2015-10-10	Win	(France) Quentin Dupponois	SMMAC 3	Basel, Switzerland	Decision	3	2:00
2015-02-01	Win	(France) Valentin Thibault	Emperor Chok Dee	Vandœuvre-lès-Nancy, France	Decision	3	2:00
Legend: Win Loss Draw/no contest Notes

== Professional boxing record ==
1 fight	1 win	0 losses
By decision	1	0

No.	Result	Record	Opponent	Type	Round, time	Date	Location	Notes
1	Win	1–0	Jean-Christophe Gomis	UD	4 (4)	1 October 2022	Großrosseln, Germany	

== See also ==
- List of male kickboxers
