= Chhut Serey Vannthong =

Cambodian martial artist

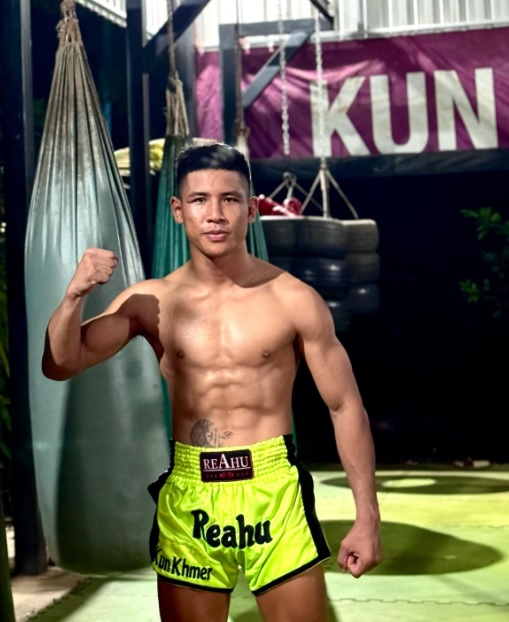
- Born: December 3, 1999 (age 26)
- Nationality: Cambodian
- Height: 170 cm (5 ft 7 in)
- Style: Pradal Serey
- Team: Rahu Club

Kickboxing record
- Total: 100
- Wins: 84
- By knockout: 33
- Losses: 13
- Draws: 3

Chhut Serey Vannthong is a Cambodian martial artist that competes professionally in the Cambodian sport of Kun Khmer. He is a member of Cambodia's national Kun Khmer team. The Kampuchea Thmey Daily previously listed him as a top 10 Kun Khmer boxer in early 2023. The Kampuchea Thmey Daily listed him as a top 10 Kun Khmer boxer for 2024. Chhut Serey Vannthong was listed as a top 5 Kun Khmer fighter at 60 kg in 2025 by CSB Sport.

== Fighting career ==
Hosted by Okhna Heng Tola, Kun Khmer International Fight Night featured a main event bout between Battambang-born practitioner Chhut Serey Vannthong and Antonio Faria who held a World Lethwei Championship title.

On August 22, 2020, Chhut Serey Vannthong lost to Elite Chamroeun 4 to 1 at the "Khmer Emperor ISI PALM-ISI PIPE" on PNN. Vannthong was dissatisfied with the results and asked the Khmer boxing federation to reconsider. He intends to fight Elite Chamroeun in the near future and asked the judges to score fairly and accurately.

Chhut Serey Vannthong was scheduled to participate in the Samdech Pichey Sena Tea Banh Cup at TV5 Boxing Arena. The tournament featured eight of Cambodia's top martial artist competing in the 60 kilogram category. The reward for the first and second-place winners included a lot, twin villa and 10x20 house and cash prizes. Serey Vannthong defeated Khim Bora and won the "Samdech Pichey Sena Tea Banh" belt. The results was a split decision with Vannthong winning 3–2 to Bora. Some fans were critical of the verdict and blamed the judges. Serey Vannthong won 6 million riel and a villa.

Chhut Serey Vannthong fought Pich Sambath in a Mas format bout. The match was a nine-minute round where knockout was the only way to claim victory. The match resulted in a draw based on the rules of the format.

Chhut Serey Vannthong made Kampuchea Thmey Daily's top 10 list of Khmer boxers who had the best first half of 2023. The fighter from Battambang was very successful in the beginning of 2023. His accomplishment included winning the NNP championship and a gold medal at the SEA Games. Chhut Serey Vannthong won the NNP Kun Khmer title by beating Elit San via points.

On September 30, 2023, Serey Vannthong knocked down Japan's Kamemoto Yusho with a series of elbows which caused the referee to stop the match in the first round.

Chhut Serey Vannthong won a title in France after winning against Khim Bora and Omar Drissi.

On August 4, 2024, Serey Vannthong was beaten by Japanese kickboxer, Taimu Hisai, within the first round at the Knock Out arena.

At the Golden Boy Kun Khmer 2025 event, Chhut Serey Vannthong defeated Spanish fighter Genis by round two.

At the event of ISKA Krud Kun Khmer, Chhut Serey Vannthong won the ISKA intercontinental belt.

At the "Top Cambodian Warriors" event at TV5 arena, Chhut Serey Vannthong was scheduled to fight Kyrgyz boxer Akhror Rozbaev, a world champion at the 60 kg low kick division at the WAKO world kickboxing championship in Abu Dhabi.

Medal record

Men's Kun Khmer

Representing Cambodia

Southeast Asian Games
Gold medal – first place	2023 Phnom Penh	Men's 60 kg

== Personal life ==
Vannthong built a new boxing club in Battambang province for the cost of no less than $30,000.

== Titles and accomplishments ==
- ISI International Palm Cup (57 kg)
- Samdech Pichey Sena Tea Banh championship (60 kg)
- NNP Championship
- Southeast Asian Games Gold Medalist (60 kg)
- ISKA Kun Khmer Intercontinental title (59 kg)

== Fight record ==
Professional Kun Khmer record
Total fights: 100, 84 wins (33 (T)KOs), 13 losses, 3 draws
Date	Result	Opponent	Event	Location	Method	Round	Time
November 23, 2026		(Japan) Riki	K-1 Revenge II	Tokyo, Japan			
October 24, 2026	Win	(Ivory Coast) Sie Richard	Krud Kun Khmer - TVK	Cambodia	KO	2	0:40
August 22, 2026	Win	(Laos) Dennongbua Nagagym	Kun Khmer on Bayon TV	Phnom Penh, Cambodia	Decision	3	
July 24, 2026	Draw	Nong-O Sor Por Por Laos	TV5 Cambodia	Cambodia	Decision	3	
June 20, 2026	Win	(France) Brandon Vieira	Kun Khmer on Bayon TV	Oyonnax, France	Decision	5	
May 31, 2026	Loss	(Ivory Coast) Momo Dembele	TVK	Cambodia	Decision	5	
May 15, 2026	Win	(Kyrgyzstan) Akhror Rozbaev	TV5	Cambodia	KO	1	
May 3, 2026	Win	(France) Mbay Samb	Hang Meas Boxing	Cambodia	Decision	5	
April 11, 2026	Win	(China) Liao Shixu	Hang Meas Boxing	Phnom Penh, Cambodia	Decision	3	
March 15, 2026	Win	(Spain) Vicente Cordaro	Hang Meas Boxing	Cambodia	Decision	3	
February 28, 2026	Win	(Spain) Sergio Pinilla Soriano	Cambodia Kun Khmer in Paris - Bayon TV	Paris, France	KO	2	
January 31, 2026	Win	(Uzbekistan) Komronmizo	Town Boxing	Cambodia	KO (livershot back kick)	1	2:09
January 17, 2026	Win	(China) Wang Jiale	Town Boxing	Cambodia	KO	2	1:54
November 29, 2025	Win	(France) Andrany Lingkhao	ISKA Krud Kun Khmer	Cambodia	TKO	3	0:14
Wins ISKA Kun Khmer Intercontinental title
November 5, 2025	Win	(China) Lu Jundong	Town Boxing	Cambodia	KO	1	0:23
October 19, 2025	Win	(Morocco) Lassen	Town Boxing	Cambodia	TKO	2	1:38
July 3, 2025	Win	(Spain) Genis Cabllé Cornell	Town Boxing	Cambodia	TKO	2	0:35
June 8, 2025	Win	(Australia) Ibrahim	Town Boxing	Takeo Province, Cambodia	Decision	3	
February 14, 2025	Loss	(Japan) Taimu Hisai	Town Boxing	Cambodia	Decision	3	
November 15, 2024	Win	(Japan) Soichiro Arata	Town Boxing	Cambodia	TKO	3	1:20
August 4, 2024	Loss	(Japan) Taimu Hisai	Knock Out x Kun Khmer	Japan	TKO	1	0:03
June 27, 2024	Loss	(Spain) Mario Alvarez	Kun Khmer Super Fight 3: Paris	Paris, France	TKO	1	1:31
June 2, 2024	Win	(Cambodia) Khim Bora	Kun Khmer Super Fight 2: Bordeaux	Bordeaux, France	Decision	3	
June 2, 2024	Win	(France) Omar Drissi	Kun Khmer Super Fight 2: Bordeaux	Bordeaux, France	Decision	3	
May 11, 2024	Win	(China) Zewa Liluo	Wu Lin Feng 2024: Cambodia vs China	Cambodia	Decision	3	
March 3, 2024	Win	(Georgia (country)) Özcan Akhmedov	Town Boxing	Cambodia	KO(dislocated shoulder)	1	0:34
November 5, 2023	Win	(Russia) Sharif Mazoriev	Town Boxing	Cambodia	KO	2	
September 30, 2023	Win	(Japan) Kamemoto Yusho	Town Boxing	Phnom Penh, Cambodia	TKO	1	0:18
September 10, 2023	Win	(Romania) Silviu Vitez	Kun Khmer Grand Champion	Phnom Penh, Cambodia	Decision	3	
June 5, 2023	Win	(Cambodia) Elit San	NNP Championship Final	Phnom Penh, Cambodia	Decision	3	
Wins NNP Championship
February 11, 2023	Draw	(Cambodia) Pich Sambath	Town Boxing	Cambodia	Decision	1	
July 24, 2022	Win	(Cambodia) Sot Veasna	ISI International Palm Cup- Town Boxing Arena	Phnom Penh, Cambodia	Decision	5	
April 10, 2022	Win	(Cambodia) Vann Voeurn	Wu Lin Feng 2022: WLF in Cambodia	Siem Reap, Cambodia	KO	2	
April 10, 2022	Win	(China) Wei Ziqin	Wu Lin Feng 2022: WLF in Cambodia	Siem Reap, Cambodia	Decision	3	
February 5, 2022	Win	(Cambodia) Elite Chamroeun	Town Boxing	Phnom Penh, Cambodia	Decision	5	
June 26, 2021	Loss	(Cambodia) Meun Mekhea	CNC Boxing	Phnom Penh, Cambodia	Decision	5	
May 22, 2021	Loss	(Cambodia) Meun Mekhea	CNC Boxing	Phnom Penh, Cambodia	KO	3	
February 27, 2021	Win	(Cambodia) Bun Sothea	Bayon TV Boxing	Phnom Penh, Cambodia	Decision	5	
August 1, 2020	Loss	(Cambodia) Elite Chamroeun	CNC TV	Phnom Penh, Cambodia	Decision	5	
June 26, 2019	Win	(Portugal) Antonio Faria	Ek Phnom Boxing Arena	Battambang, Cambodia	TKO	2	
August 18, 2018	Loss	(Cambodia) Long Chin	SEA TV	Phnom Penh, Cambodia	Decision	5	
