= Bovel =

Bovel Bovèu (Gallo)
- Commune
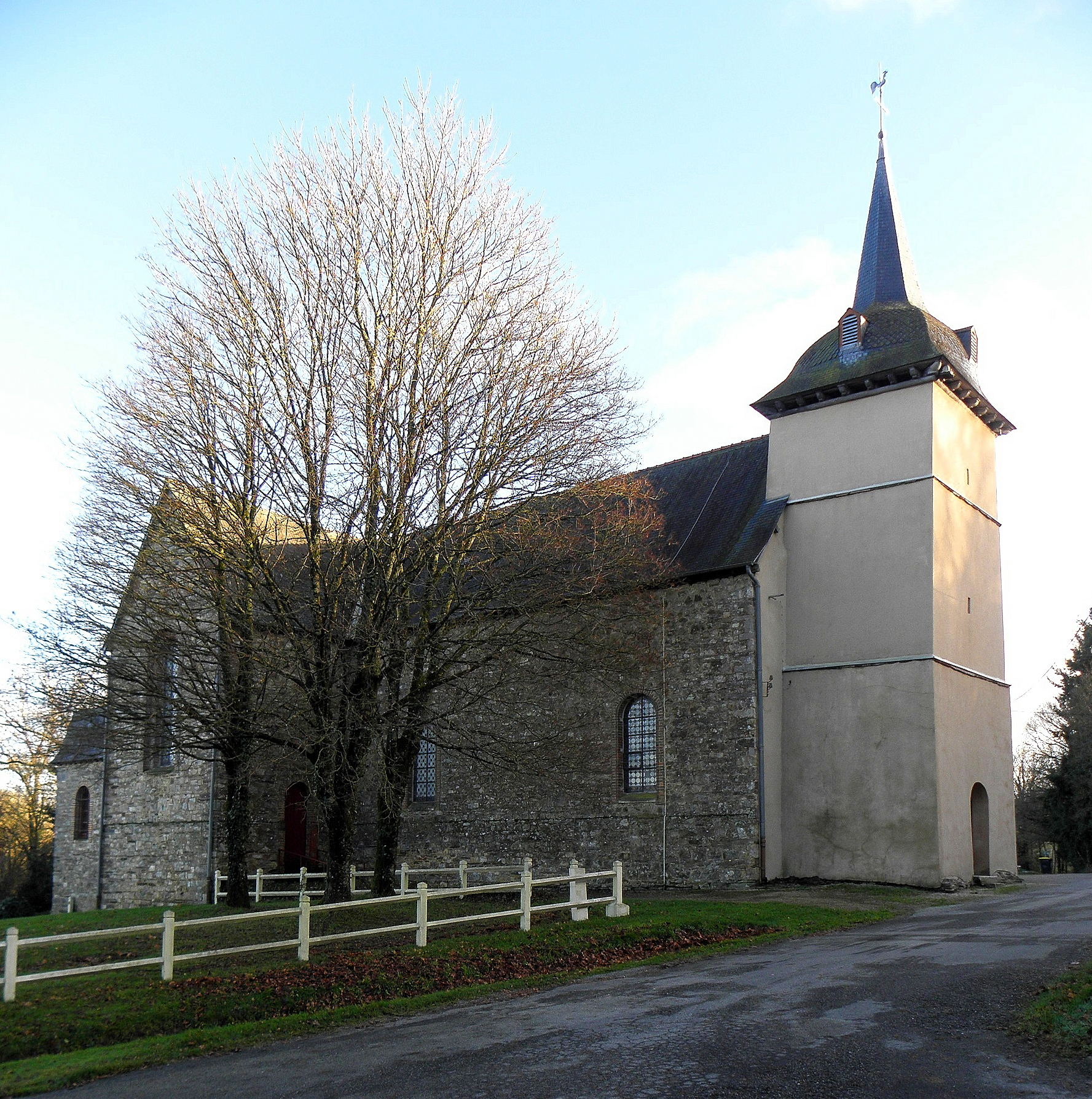
- The church of Bovel
- Location of Bovel
- Location within France Location within Brittany
- Coordinates: 47°57′03″N 1°58′33″W
- Country: France
- Region: Brittany
- Department: Ille-et-Vilaine
- Arrondissement: Redon
- Canton: Guichen

Government
  - Mayor (2020–2026): José Mercier
- Area^{1}: 14.60 km^{2} (5.64 sq mi)
- Highest elevation: 128 m (420 ft)
- Lowest elevation: 45 m (148 ft)
- Population (2023): 618
  - Density: 42.3/km^{2} (110/sq mi)
- Time zone: UTC+01:00 (CET)
  - Summer (DST): UTC+02:00 (CEST)
- INSEE/Postal code: 35035 /35330
- ^{1} French Land Register data, which excludes lakes, ponds, glaciers > 1 km^{2} (0.386 sq mi or 247 acres) and river estuaries.

Bovel (French pronunciation: [bɔvɛl]; Breton: Bovel; Gallo: Bovèu) is a commune in the Ille-et-Vilaine department in Brittany in north-France.

== Population ==
Historical population
Year	Pop.	±% p.a.
1968	388	—
1975	306	−3.33%
1982	303	−0.14%
1990	312	+0.37%
1999	331	+0.66%
2007	523	+5.88%
2012	589	+2.41%
2017	605	+0.54%
2023	618	+0.35%
Source: INSEE

Inhabitants of Bovel are called Bovellois in French.

== See also ==
- Communes of the Ille-et-Vilaine department
