= Kampuchea Thmei Daily =

Daily newspaper in Cambodia

Kampuchea Thmei Daily is a daily newspaper published in Cambodia. The papers headquarters are in Phnom Penh. The newspaper focuses on business and politics.
