= Filipinos in Japan =

Minority ethnic group in Japan

Total population
- 356,579 (in December, 2025)

Regions with significant populations
- Tokyo, Yokohama, Nagoya, Osaka

Languages
- Filipino, English, Japanese, other languages of the Philippines

Religion
- Predominantly Christianity; Minority: Buddhism, Shinto, Tenrikyo, and Islam

Filipinos in Japan (Japanese: 在日フィリピン人, Zainichi Firipinjin, Filipino: Mga Pilipino sa Hapon) formed a population of 356,579 individuals in December 2025, making them Japan's fourth-largest foreign community, according to the statistics of the Philippines. Their population reached as high as 245,518 in 1998, but fell to 144,871 individuals in 2000 before beginning to recover slightly when Japan cracked down on human trafficking. In 2006, Japanese/Filipino marriages were the most frequent of all international marriages in Japan. As of 2016, the Filipino population in Japan was 237,103 according to the Ministry of Justice. Filipinos in Japan formed a population of 325,000 individuals at year-end 2020, making them Japan's third-largest foreign community along with Vietnamese, according to the statistics of the Philippine Global National Inquirer and the Ministry of Justice. In December 2021, the number of Filipinos in Japan was estimated at 276,615.

According to figures published by the Central Bank of the Philippines, overseas Filipino workers in Japan remitted more than US$1 billion between 1990 and 1999; one newspaper described the contributions of overseas workers as a "major source of life support for the Philippines' ailing economy." Though most Filipinos in Japan are short-term residents, the history of their community extends back further; during the Japanese occupation of the Philippines, some Filipino students studied in Japanese universities.

== Media ==
There is a magazine called Kumusta! (クムスタ). Junta Shimozawa publishes and edits the Japanese portion and his spouse Hermie edits the Tagalog version. In 1996 it had a weekly circulation of 30,000, and its website was to appear in March of that month.

== Notable people ==
=== Entertainment ===
- Leah Dizon, American-born singer, model and television personality
- Ruby Moreno, actress
- Mokomichi Hayami, actor, chef, TV presenter, entrepreneur, and model
- Miho Nishida, actress and model
- Nicole Abe, fashion model
- Noriyuki Abe, film director
- Sayaka Akimoto, actress and singer
- Hiromi, fashion model
- Elaiza Ikeda, fashion model and actress
- Ena Mori, singer-songwriter and musician
- Mark Ishii, voice actor
- Rie Kaneko, model and singer
- Loveli, fashion model
- Rika Mamiya, model and singer
- Megumi Nakajima, voice actress and singer
- Maiko Nakamura, singer
- Chieko Ochi, singer, model and actress
- Aiko Otake, model
- Reimy, musician
- Rikako Sasaki, singer
- Alan Shirahama, actor and DJ
- Anna Suda, actress and dancer
- Mika dela Cruz, actress based in the Philippines
- Maryjun Takahashi, actress and model
- Yu Takahashi, actress
- Emiri Yamashita, former member of HKT48
- Zawachin, television personality
- Anna Mima, singer
- Ruben Aquino, animator
- Hikari Kuroki, model, gravure idol and actress
- Mei Angela, model, gravure model and actress
- Maya Imamori, model, gravure idol and actress
- Takeru Gutierez, singer, dancer and idol for BXW
- Anthonny Iinuma, singer, dancer and idol on Produce 101 Japan (season 2) and idol for boy group, TOZ
- Shogo Noji, singer, dancer and idol on Produce 101 Japan (season 2)
- Yuri Komagata, singer and voice actress
- Yuki Kimura, model, gravure idol and actress
- Aya Natsumi, singer, dancer and idol on Aya Natsumi Universe Ticket

=== Sports ===
- Tomohiko Hoshina, judoka
- Masunoyama Tomoharu, sumo wrestler
- Asahi Masuyama, footballer
- Hikaru Minegishi, footballer
- Mitakeumi Hisashi, sumo wrestler
- Mucha Mori, basketball player
- Kodo Nakano, judoka
- Ryuya Ogawa, baseball player
- Satoshi Ōtomo, footballer
- Risa Sato, volleyball player
- Daisuke Sato, footballer
- Syuri, pro wrestler and MMA competitor
- Yuji Takahashi, footballer
- Takayasu Akira, sumo wrestler
- Paulo Junichi Tanaka, footballer
- Chiaki Tone, baseball player
- Emi Watanabe, figure skater
- Kiyomi Watanabe, judoka
- Yuka Saso, golfer
- Edward Yamamoto, basketball player
- Yasuaki Yamasaki, baseball player
- Maharu Yoshimura, table tennis player
- Hirotaka Urabe, kickboxer
- Koya Urabe, kickboxer
- Jefferson Tabinas, footballer
- Paul Tabinas, footballer
- Kōtokuzan Tarō, sumo wrestler

=== Other ===
- Artemio Ricarte, Philippine general

== See also ==
- Japan–Philippines relations
- Ethnic groups of Japan
- Japanese settlement in the Philippines
- Smile (TBS), a TV series which focused on a half Japanese, half Filipino man
