= Glory of Heroes =

Chinese kickboxing promotion

- Industry: Kickboxing promotion
- Founded: 2016
- Headquarters: Beijing, China
- Key people: Guo Chendong (Founder and CEO)
- Owner: Beijing Wanmingyang Media

Glory of Heroes or GOH (Chinese: 勇士的荣耀; pinyin: yǒng shì de róng yào), is a Chinese kickboxing promotion developed by Beijing Wanmingyang Media. The events are streamed live on iQiyi and delay broadcast every Sunday at 22:00 on Shenzhen Television.

== History ==
=== 2016 ===
Glory of Heroes by Wanmingyang Media was announced on February 18, 2016. The first Glory of Heroes event took place on April 2 in Shenzhen, China.

Glory of Heroes was started by former Wu Lin Feng announcer/producer Guo Chendong and the five first events aired live on Henan Television. Guo Chendong later left Henan TV and the promotions broadcast relationship with the channel ended.

Another new line of events called “Rise of Heroes” started on September 17, 2016 in Chaoyang, Liaoning, China. It first broadcast on Beijing TV on October 13, 2016.

Glory of Heroes (勇士的荣耀) – Mostly kickboxing but also some MMA fights. Started in 2016. Events are streamed live and broadcast on tv delayed at later dates.

=== 2017 ===
Glory of Heroes crowned their first champions in a series of events in late 2017 and early 2018.

July 16, 2017, Glory of Heroes and Krush jointly organized a Japan VS China themed event, with contestants such as: Qiu Jianliang, Tie Yinghua, Deng Zeqi, Yun Qi, Hirotaka Urabe, HIROYA, Kosuke Komiyama, Makoto Uehara.

Glory of Heroes 6: Genesis made the promotions debut on Shenzhen TV. Conquest of Heroes MMA events also started to broadcast weekly on Shenzhen TV.

== Events ==
No.	Event	Date	Venue	City
01	Glory of Heroes 1	April 2, 2016	Bao'an Stadium	Shenzhen, China
02	Glory of Heroes 2	May 7, 2016	Bao'an Stadium	Shenzhen, China
03	Glory of Heroes 3	July 2, 2016	Jiyuan Basketball Stadium	Jiyuan, Henan, China
04	Glory of Heroes 4	August 6, 2016	Changzhi Stadium	Changzhi, Shanxi, China
05	Rise of Heroes 1	September 17, 2016	Chaoyang Stadium	Chaoyang, Liaoning, China
06	Glory of Heroes 5	October 1, 2016	Henan Province Sports Center Stadium	Zhengzhou, China
07	Rise of Heroes 2	October 15, 2016	Nanchang Institute of Technology Stadium	Zhangshu, Jiangxi, China
08	Rise of Heroes 3	October 29, 2016	Changji Gymnasium	Changji, Xinjiang, China
09	Rise of Heroes 4: Europe VS China	November 19, 2016	Salle Du Midi	Martigny, Switzerland
10	Conquest of Heroes 1: Jiyuan	December 2 and 3, 2016	Jiyuan Basketball Stadium	Jiyuan, Henan, China
11	Rise of Heroes 5	December 17, 2016	Jiangnan Gymnasium	Nanning, China
12	Rise of Heroes 6	January 1, 2017	Ming Hua Gymnasium	Puning, Guangdong, China
13	Glory of Heroes 6	January 13, 2017	Jiyuan Basketball Stadium	Jiyuan, Henan, China
14	Rise of Heroes 7: China vs New Zealand	February 18, 2017	ASB Stadium	Auckland, New Zealand
15	Glory of Heroes 7	March 4, 2017	Ginasio do Ibirapuera	Sao Paulo, Brazil
16	Rise of Heroes: Hengyang	March 25, 2017	Hengyang Sports Center	Hengyang, Hunan, China
17	Rise of Heroes / Conquest of Heroes 2: Chengde	April 28, 2017	Olympic Sports Center Gymnasium	Chengde, Hebei, China
18	Glory of Heroes: Spain / Strikers League	May 20, 2017	Santa Cruz de Tenerife	Tenerife, Spain
19	Glory of Heroes: Portugal / Strikers League	May 27, 2017	Pavilhao Quinta dos Lombos	Carcavelos, Portugal
20	Glory of Heroes: Shangyu	June 16, 2017	Shangyu Huatong Gymnasium	Shangyu, Zhejiang, China
21	Glory of Heroes: Japan / Krush.77	July 16, 2017	Korakuen Hall	Tokyo, Japan
22	Glory of Heroes: Luoyang	September 23, 2017	Wan Ming Tang Sports Center	Luoyang, Henan, China
23	Glory of Heroes: China VS Spain	November 11, 2017	Pabellon Fernando Martin Fuenlabrada	Madrid, Spain
24	Glory of Heroes: China VS Switzerland	November 18, 2017	Salle Du Midi	Martigny, Switzerland
25	Glory of Heroes: Jinan	December 23, 2017	Jinan Olympic Sports Center	jinan, China
26	Glory of Heroes: Wudang Mountain	January 6, 2018	Wudang International Wushu Exchange Center	Hubei, China
27	Glory of Heroes: Guangzhou	January 13, 2018	Guangzhou University Town Sports Cent	Guangzhou, China
28	Glory of Heroes: Qingdao	January 27, 2018	China University of Petroleum Huadong Gymnasium	Qingdao, China
29	Glory of Heroes: Chengdu	February 3, 2018	Sichuan International Tennis Center	Chengdu, China
30	Glory of Heroes: New Zealand vs China	March 3, 2018	ASB Stadium	Auckland, New Zealand
31	Glory of Heroes 31: Beijing	May 26, 2018	Beijing Police Academy	Beijing, China
32	Glory of Heroes 32: Huizhou	July 7, 2018	Huiyang Sports Exhibition Center	Guangdong, China
33	Glory of Heroes 33: Shanghai	July 28, 2018	Shanghai Baoshan Gymnasium	Shanghai, China
34	Glory of Heroes 34: Tongling	September 15, 2018	Tongling Sports Center	Anhui, China
35	Glory of Heroes 35: Meishan	October 12, 2018	Meishan Gymnasium	Sichuan, China
36	Glory of Heroes 36: Ziyang	October 20, 2018	Ziyang Gymnasium	Sichuan, China

== Champions ==
=== Current champions ===
Division	Upper weight limit	Champion	Since	Title defenses
Junior Lightweight	67 kg (147.7 lb)	(China) Tie Yinghua	January 13, 2018	0
Featherweight	65 kg (143.3 lb)	(China) Qiu Jianliang	December 23, 2017	0
Junior Featherweight	63 kg (138.9 lb)	(China) Wei Rui	July 7, 2018	0
Bantamweight	60 kg (132.3 lb)	(China) Feng Liang	January 13, 2018	1
Junior Bantamweight	57 kg (125.7 lb)	(Russia) Astemir Borsov	January 13, 2018	0

=== GOH Junior Lightweight Championship ===
-67 kg (-147.7 lb)

No.	Name	Event	Date	Defenses
Current	(China) Tie Yinghua def. Mohamed Hendouf	Glory of Heroes: Guangzhou; Guangzhou, China	January 13, 2018	

=== GOH Featherweight Championship ===
-65 kg (-143.3 lb)

No.	Name	Event	Date	Defenses
Current	(China) Qiu Jianliang def. Dylan Salvador	Glory of Heroes: Jinan; Jinan, China	December 23, 2017	

=== GOH Junior Featherweight Championship ===
-63 kg (-138.9 lb)

No.	Name	Event	Date	Defenses
Current	(China) Wei Rui def. Deng Zeqi	Glory of Heroes 32: Huizhou; Guangdong, China	July 7, 2017	

=== GOH Bantamweight Championship ===
-60 kg (-132.3 lb)

No.	Name	Event	Date	Defenses
Current	(China) Feng Liang def. Zheng Junfeng	Glory of Heroes: Guangzhou; Guangzhou, China	January 13, 2018	1. def. Yun Qi at Glory of Heroes 36: Ziyang on October 20, 2018 in Sichuan, China

=== GOH Junior Bantamweight Championship ===
-57 kg (-125.7 lb)

No.	Name	Event	Date	Defenses
Current	(Russia) Astemir Borsov def. Hakim Hamech	Glory of Heroes: Guangzhou; Guangzhou, China	January 13, 2018	

=== Tournament champions ===
Weight Class	Champion	Runner-up	Event	Date	Tournament Bracket
Rise of Heroes 3: 80kg 4-man Tournament	(China) Li Hui	(Belarus) Sviryd Alieksendr	Rise of Heroes 3: Changji	October 29, 2016	
Rise of Heroes 3: 75kg 4-man Tournament	(Brazil) Matheus Pereira	(China) Huang Zhenyou	Rise of Heroes 3: Changji	October 29, 2016	
Rise of Heroes 3: 65kg 4-man Tournament	(China) Fu Qingnan	(Spain) Menuel Ferendex	Rise of Heroes 3: Changji	October 29, 2016	
Rise of Heroes 3: 63kg 4-man Tournament	(Romania) Cristian Spetcu	(China) Wang Wanli	Rise of Heroes 3: Changji	October 29, 2016	
Rise of Heroes 2: 71kg 4-man Tournament	(China) Hu Yafei	(China) Zhao Chunyang	Rise of Heroes 2: Zhangshu	October 15, 2016	
Rise of Heroes 2: 68kg 4-man Tournament	(Thailand) Singsuriya Sakchai	(Russia) Bmiev Arbi	Rise of Heroes 2: Zhangshu	October 15, 2016	
Rise of Heroes 2: 60kg 4-man Tournament	(Thailand) Kaeongam Narongwut	(China) Yuan Ya	Rise of Heroes 2: Zhangshu	October 15, 2016	
Rise of Heroes 2: 57kg 4-man Tournament	(Russia) Astemir Borsov	(China) Li Xiang	Rise of Heroes 2: Zhangshu	October 15, 2016	
Rise of Heroes 1: 71kg 4-man Tournament	(Portugal) Luiz Perreira	(Germany) Talha Tunc	Rise of Heroes 1: Chaoyang	September 17, 2016	
Rise of Heroes 1: 68kg 4-man Tournament	(Spain) Issam Chadid	(Thailand) Rungthiwa Kueabram	Rise of Heroes 1: Chaoyang	September 17, 2016	
Rise of Heroes 1: 60kg 4-man Tournament	(China) Feng Liang	(China) Yun Qi	Rise of Heroes 1: Chaoyang	September 17, 2016	
Rise of Heroes 1: 57kg 4-man Tournament	(China) Wang Junguang	(China) Feng Tianhao	Rise of Heroes 1: Chaoyang	September 17, 2016	

== Notable fighters ==
- (Belgium) Filip Verlinden
- (Brazil) Alex Pereira
- (Canada) Gabriel Varga
- (China) Fang Bian
- (China) Qiu Jianliang
- (China) Wei Rui
- (China) Xu Yan
- (China) Yang Zhuo
- (China) Yi Long
- (China) Deng Zeqi
- (China) Yun Qi
- (China) Tie Yinghua
- (Germany) Enriko Kehl
- (France) Cedric Doumbe
- (France) Dylan Salvador
- (France) Fabio Pinca
- (France) Raphaël Llodra
- (Japan) Hirotaka Urabe
- (Japan) Masahiro Yamamoto
- (Japan) Yuichiro Nagashima
- (Morocco) Ilias Bulaid
- (Netherlands) Jemyma Betrian
- (Netherlands) Massaro Glunder
- (Netherlands) Sergio Wielzen
- (New Zealand) Israel Adesanya
- (Romania) Bogdan Stoica
- (Thailand) Armin Pumpanmuang Windy Sport
- (Thailand) Jomthong Chuwattana
- (Thailand) Kaew Fairtex
- (Thailand) Kem Sitsongpeenong
- (Thailand) Manaowan Sitsongpeenong
- (Thailand) Petpanomrung Kiatmuu9
- (Thailand) Saiyok Pumpanmuang
- (Thailand) Singdam Kiatmuu9
- (Thailand) Sudsakorn Sor Klinmee
- (Thailand) Narong Bunchan
