= Yu Takahashi =

Yu Takahashi may refer to:

- Yu Takahashi (singer-songwriter), Japanese male singer-songwriter
- Yu Takahashi (actress), Japanese actress and model
