= Filipino Japanese =

Filipino Japanese or Japanese Filipino may refer to:

- Japan–Philippines relations
- Filipinos in Japan
- Japanese settlement in the Philippines
- Japanese occupation of the Philippines
