= W.A.K.O. European Championships 2008 (Varna) =

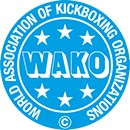
- The poster for W.A.K.O. European Championships 2008 (Varna)
- Promotion: W.A.K.O.
- Date: 22–25 October 2008
- Venue: Palace of Culture and Sports
- City: Varna, Bulgaria

Event chronology
W.A.K.O. World Championships 2007 (Coimbra)	W.A.K.O. European Championships 2008 (Varna)	W.A.K.O. European Championships 2008 (Oporto)

W.A.K.O. European Championships 2008 in Varna were the joint twenty European kickboxing championships held by the W.A.K.O. organization arranged by the Bulgarian kickboxing chief Boyan Kolev, with the second event to be held the next month in Oporto, Portugal. It was the second W.A.K.O. event to be held in Varna and Bulgaria (the last was in 1992) and involved around 500 amateur men and women from 35 countries across Europe.

There were four styles on offer at Varna: Full-Contact and Semi-Contact kickboxing, Musical Forms and Aero-Kickboxing. Only one competitor per weight division were allowed to participate in the Full and Semi-Contact divisions and this also applied for Aero-Kickboxing (which had no weight divisions), while Musical Forms was allowed two maximum per country. The other styles (Low-Kick, K-1, Light-Contact) would be available at the later event in Portugal. The top nation by the end of the championships was Hungary, with regular leaders Russia in second and Ukraine in third. The event was held over four days at the Palace of Culture and Sports in Varna, Bulgaria, starting on Wednesday, 22 October and ending on Saturday, 25 October 2008.

== Full-Contact ==
Full-Contact is a style of kickboxing where punches and kicks are allowed to be thrown by the participants at full force, with strikes below the waist prohibited. Most fights result in a judge’s decision or stoppage victory and as with most other forms of amateur kickboxing, head and various body protection must be worn. More information on Full-Contact and the rules can be found at the official W.A.K.O. website. The men had twelve weight divisions in Varga ranging from 51 kg/112.2 lbs to over 91 kg/+200.2 lbs while the women had seven ranging from 48 kg/105.6 lbs to over 70 kg/+143 lbs. Unlike previous W.A.K.O. championships there was not an influx of talent at the Varga event with only several repeat winners such as Alexey Tokarev, having won gold at the world championships in Coimbra the previous year, and Serhiy Cherkaskyy and Hamza Kendircioğlu, having won gold medals at the Europeans in Lisbon two years before. Russia were the strongest nation in the style, pipping neighbours Ukraine into first place by virtue of having won five golds, two silvers and two bronze.

=== Men's Full-Contact Kickboxing Medals Table ===
Event	Gold	Silver	Bronze
Light Bantamweight -51 kg	Vyacheslav Kanayev (Russia)	Ivan Sciolla (Italy)	Artem Skobchenko (Ukraine); Wojciech Perit (Poland)
Bantamweight -54 kg	Serhiy Cherkaskyy (Ukraine)	Franck Gross (France)	Filip Ehsan (Bulgaria); Ilnaz Sayfullin (Russia)
Featherweight -57 kg	Alexander Shamray (Russia)	Damian Ławniczak (Poland)	Gregor Debeljak (Slovenia); Johannes Wolf (Germany)
Lightweight -60 kg	Vasily Zaytsev (Russia)	Søren Jørgensen (Norway)	Prodan Iovchev (Bulgaria); Emrah Ogut (Turkey)
Light Welterweight -63.5 kg	Gabor Gorbics (Hungary)	Kenan Gunaydin (Turkey)	Kostyantyn Demoretskyy (Ukraine); Tomasz Pietraszewski (Poland)
Welterweight -67 kg	Edmond Mebenga (France)	Davyd Ahakhanov (Ukraine)	Ibrahim Cicek (Turkey); Jarkko Jussila (Finland)
Light Middleweight -71 kg	Christian Kvatningen (Norway)	Vladimir Tarasov (Russia)	Svetoslav Malechkov (Bulgaria); Przemysław Ziemnicki (Poland)
Middleweight -75 kg	Andreas Lødrup (Norway)	Stilian Angelov (Bulgaria)	Pavel Garaj (Slovakia); Viktor Pethes (Hungary)
Light Heavyweight -81 kg	Igor Prykhodko (Ukraine)	Artak Aganesyan (Russia)	Ferenc Hosszu (Hungary); Igor Emkic (Bosnia and Herzegovina)
Cruiserweight -86 kg	Mairis Briedis (Latvia)	Rafał Aleksandrowicz (Poland)	Gamal Hazimeh (Israel); Petar Iliev (Bulgaria)
Heavyweight -91 kg	Alexey Tokarev (Russia)	Denys Simkin (Ukraine)	Veniamin Davidis (Greece); Ladislav Kacmarak (Slovakia)
Super Heavyweight +91 kg	Hamza Kendircioğlu (Turkey)	Jukka Saarinen (Finland)	Jacek Puchacz (Poland); Tihamer Brunner (Hungary)

=== Women's Full-Contact Kickboxing Medals Table ===
Event	Gold	Silver	Bronze
Bantamweight -48 kg	Vira Makresova (Ukraine)	Marja-Liisa Väänänen (Finland)	Plamena Dimova (Bulgaria); Therese Gunnarsson (Sweden)
Featherweight -52 kg	Nadiya Khayenok (Ukraine)	Mette Solli (Norway)	Sabine Seifert (Germany); Liza Padazi (Italy)
Lightweight -56 kg	Valeriya Ishakova (Russia)	Eva Maria Naranjo (Spain)	Tonje Sørlie (Norway); Zsuzsanna Szuknai (Hungary)
Middleweight -60 kg	Thea Therese Næss (Norway)	Maria Konstadelov (Greece)	Monika Florek (Poland); Sanja Samardzic (Bosnia and Herzegovina)
Light Heavyweight -65 kg	Katarina Furmaniau (Poland)	Julia Irmen (Germany)	Anne Katas (Finland); Oleksandra Pliusnina (Ukraine)
Heavyweight -70 kg	Caroline Ek (Sweden)	Marija Pejakovic (Serbia)	Irena Gavrelova (Russia); Nives Radic (Croatia)
Super Heavyweight +70 kg	Zeliha Dogrugunes (Turkey)	Karen Dews (United Kingdom)	Adina Cocieru (Romania); Valeria Mercurio (Italy)

== Semi-Contact ==
Semi-Contact is the least physical of the contact kickboxing styles available at W.A.K.O. events. It involves the participants throwing controlled strikes at targets above the waist, with point's scored on the basis of speed and technique with power prohibited. Despite the less physical nature all contestants must wear head and various body protection - more detail on the Semi-Contact and the rules can be found on the official W.A.K.O. website. At Vargas the men had nine weight divisions ranging from 57 kg/125.4 lbs to over 94 kg/+206.8 lbs while the women had six, ranging from 50 kg/110 lbs to over 70 kg/154 lbs and there was also a mixed team event.

Although not full of recognisable faces there were several winners from recent world and European championships with Zsolt Moradi and Zsofia Minda picking up their third gold medals in a row at W.A.K.O. championships, while Andrea Lucchese, Marco Culiersi, Anna Kondar and Gloria De Bei had also won at the last world championships. By the end of the championships, Hungary were easily the most dominant nation in the style, winning ten gold, two silver and two bronze, which also included winning the team event as well.

=== Men's Semi-Contact Kickboxing Medals Table ===
Event	Gold	Silver	Bronze
-57 kg	Richard Veres (Hungary)	Robbie Hughes (United Kingdom)	Jason Doyle (Republic of Ireland); Piotr Bakowski (Poland)
-63 kg	Andrea Lucchese (Italy)	Viktor Hirsch (Hungary)	Klemen Buzina (Slovenia); Vitaly Timofeev (Russia)
-69 kg	Laszlo Gombos (Hungary)	Domenico De Marco (Italy)	Michael Gebhart (Austria); Christian Welker (Germany)
-74 kg	Tamas Imre (Hungary)	Gregorio Di Leo (Italy)	Morten Spissoy (Norway); Nikos Memmos (Greece)
-79 kg	Zsolt Moradi (Hungary)	Stella Neri (Italy)	Rami-Alexandras Raslan (Greece); Billy Bryce (United Kingdom)
-84 kg	Kristian Jaroszkiewicz (Hungary)	Robert Knödelseder (Germany)	Andreas Anelopoulos (Greece); Zvonmir Gribl (Croatia)
-89 kg	Michel Decian (Switzerland)	Drew Neal (United Kingdom)	Zoltan Dancso (Hungary); Dave Hetternan (Republic of Ireland)
-94 kg	Giuseppe De Marco (Italy)	Peter Csikos (Hungary)	Gunther Wenninger (Austria); Petr Kotik (Czech Republic)
+94 kg	Tibor Wappel (Hungary)	Lee Matthews (United Kingdom)	Daniel Handel (Germany); Gunter Wohlwend (Liechtenstein)

=== Women's Semi-Contact Kickboxing Medals Table ===
Event	Gold	Silver	Bronze
-50 kg	Sharon Gill (United Kingdom)	Valentina Barbieri (Italy)	Sinead Beasley (Republic of Ireland); Ksenia Guralnik (Russia)
-55 kg	Dorota Godzina (Poland)	Sharon McDermott (Republic of Ireland)	Linda Fogliano (Italy); Klaudia Diligens (Hungary)
-60 kg	Gloria De Bei (Italy)	Ida Abrahamsen (Norway)	Emilia Szablowska (Poland); Fadeeva Svetlana (Russia)
-65 kg	Bojan Dancsecs (Hungary)	Elaine Small (Republic of Ireland)	Irena Kobosilova (Czech Republic); Ina Grindheim (Norway)
-70 kg	Zsofia Minda (Hungary)	Ana Znaor (Croatia)	Natalie Cassidy (Republic of Ireland); Adriane Doppler (Germany)
+70 kg	Anna Kondar (Hungary)	Ciara McShane (Republic of Ireland)	Jennifer Otoo (United Kingdom); Maria Mauriello (Italy)

=== Team's Semi-Contact Kickboxing Medals Table ===
Event	Gold	Silver	Bronze
Team	Hungary	Italy	Germany; Great Britain (United Kingdom)

== Musical Forms ==
Musical Forms is a type of non-physical competition which sees the contestants fighting against imaginary foes using Martial Arts techniques - more information on the style can be found on the W.A.K.O. website. Unlike Full and Semi-Contact kickboxing there were no weight divisions, only male and female competitions and competitors were allowed to compete in more than one category with some countries having than one athlete in each category. The men and women at Varga competed in four different styles explained below:

- Hard Styles – coming from Karate and Taekwondo.
- Soft Styles – coming from Kung Fu and Wu-Sha.
- Hard Styles with Weapons – using weapons such as Kama, Sai, Tonfa, Nunchaku, Bō, Katana.
- Soft Styles with Weapons - using weapons such as Naginata, Nunchaku, Tai Chi Chuan Sword, Whip Chain.

There were a few familiar winners in Musical Forms at Varga, with regular gold medallists Andrey Bosak and Maria Pekarchyk winning two events each and Veronika Dombrovskaya winning one. By the end of the championships Russia were the top nation in Musical Forms winning four gold, six silver and one bronze.

=== Men's Musical Forms Medals Table ===
Event	Gold	Silver	Bronze
Hard Styles	Andrey Savushkin (Russia)	Phil Campbell (United Kingdom)	Alberto Leonardi (Italy)
Soft Styles	Andrey Bosak (Russia)	Nikita Pavlov (Russia)	Sedat Sagiroglu (Turkey)
Hard Styles - Weapons	Massimiliano Castellacci (Italy)	Andrey Savushkin (Russia)	Kevin Cetout (France)
Soft Styles - Weapons	Andrey Bosak (Russia)	Nikita Pavlov (Russia)	Filippo Fontana (Italy)

=== Women's Musical Forms Medals Table ===
Event	Gold	Silver	Bronze
Hard Styles	Maria Pekarchyk (Belarus)	Elena Chirkova (Russia)	Anastasiya Ovod (Ukraine)
Soft Styles	Veronika Dombrovskaya (Belarus)	Inna Bekestovaya (Russia)	Danausova Darya (Ukraine)
Hard Styles - Weapons	Maria Pekarchyk (Belarus)	Anna Likhonina (Russia)	Anastasiya Ovod (Ukraine); Elena Chirkova (Russia)
Soft Styles - Weapons	Ekaterina Chizhikova (Russia)	Veronika Dombrovskaya (Belarus)	Danausova Darya (Ukraine)

== Aero-Kickboxing ==
Aero-Kickboxing is a non-physical competition, involving participants using a mixture of aerobic and kickboxing techniques in time to specifically selected music. There are no weight divisions as with other forms of kickboxing in W.A.K.O. but there are separate male, female and team categories, with or without an aerobic step. As with Musical Forms, competitors were allowed to compete in more than one category and some countries had more than one athlete in each category. More information on Aero-Kickboxing and the rules can be found on the W.A.K.O. website. Although a lower prestige sport compared to other events, Mikhail Gerasimov stood out amongst the winners by taking gold in both men's events. The top nation in Aero-Kickboxing was Hungary who claimed four golds, one silver and one bronze, which included winning both of the team events.

=== Men's Aero-Kickboxing Medals Table ===
Event	Gold	Silver	Bronze
Aero Individual without Step	Mikhail Gerasimov (Russia)	Mihaly Perneki (Hungary)	İnanç Kahveci (Turkey)
Aero Individual with Step	Mikhail Gerasimov (Russia)	Husrev Uzunali (Turkey)	Mihaly Perneki (Hungary)

=== Women's Aero-Kickboxing Medals Table ===
Event	Gold	Silver	Bronze
Aero Individual without Step	Brigitta Gazdag (Hungary)	Darya Danausova (Ukraine)	Tina Gerbec (Austria)
Aero Individual with Step	Marianna Hegyi (Hungary)	Olena Sereda (Ukraine)	Darya Danausova (Ukraine)

=== Team Aero-Kickboxing Medals Table ===
Event	Gold	Silver	Bronze
Aero Team without Step	Hungary	Croatia	Austria
Aero Team with Step	Hungary	Croatia	No bronze awarded

== Overall Medals Standing (Top 5) ==
Ranking	Country	Gold (gold)	Silver (silver)	Bronze (bronze)
1	Hungary	15	3	7
2	Russia	11	8	6
3	Ukraine	4	4	8
4	Italy	4	6	6
5	Norway	3	3	3

== See also ==
- List of WAKO Amateur European Championships
- List of WAKO Amateur World Championships
- List of male kickboxers
- List of female kickboxers
