= Franck Gross =

French kickboxer (born 1988)

- Born: Franck Giovanni Gross; 26 February 1988 (age 38); Beaucaire, Gard, France
- Nickname: "Le Niglo"
- Nationality: French
- Height: 1.62 m (5 ft 4 in)
- Weight: 55 kg (121 lb; 8 st 9 lb)
- Division: Flyweight; Bantamweight
- Style: Kickboxing
- Stance: Orthodox
- Fighting out of: Montpellier, France
- Team: Team NIGLO / VXS
- Years active: 2011 - present

Kickboxing record
- Total: 98
- Wins: 83
- By knockout: 27
- Losses: 14
- Draws: 1

Franck Gross (born 26 February 1988) is a French kickboxer who has been professionally competing since 2011. He is the current WAKO Bantamweight World K1 Champion and the current ISKA Oriental Rules Featherweight champion.

He is the former ISKA Bantamweight Champion, the former Enfusion Bantamweight World Champion, and the former WBC Muaythai International Flyweight Champion.

== Kickboxing career ==
Gross made his first title bid in 2011, when he fought Hakim Hamech for the national kickboxing championship. Gross lost via unanimous decision.

In July 2014 he was scheduled to fight Romie Adanza for the WBC Muaythai International Flyweight Title. Gross won a split decision to capture his first major championship.

In 2017 he fought Laszlo Zako for the ISKA World Bantamweight title. He won the championship by a fourth round TKO.

After winning his next four fights, he faced Elshad Aleksarov for the WAKO World Bantamweight title. Gross won via unanimous decision.

He attempted his first ISKA title defense against Eisaku Ogasawara during Rebels 52. He lost via unanimous decision.

He won his next two fights, and would defend his WAKO title against Hissam Bougadir. Gross won via unanimous decision.

In 2018 he faced Milan Iseli for the Enfusion World Bantamweight title. Gross won the title via unanimous decision.

Gross won seven out of his next eight fights, with a perfect 5-0 in 2019. During this time, he won the ISKA Featherweight Oriental Rules title, with a decision win over Djany Fiorenti.

Gross is expected to defend his Enfusion title against Jan Szajko on 17 October. The fight fell through because of injuries.

== Championships and accomplishments ==
=== Professional ===
- World Boxing Council Muaythai
  - WBC Muaythai International Flyweight Championship (one time, former)
- International Sport Karate Association
  - ISKA Bantamweight World K-1 Championship (one time, former)
  - ISKA Featherweight World Oriental Rules Championship
- World Association of Kickboxing Organizations
  - WAKO K1 Bantamweight World Championship
    - One successful title defense
- Enfusion
  - Enfusion Bantamweight World Championship

=== Amateur ===
- World Association of Kickboxing Organizations
  - 2008 W.A.K.O. European Championships Full Contact -54 kg (silver)

== Kickboxing record ==
Professional kickboxing record
83 wins (27 KOs), 14 losses, 1 draw
Date	Result	Opponent	Event	Location	Method	Round	Time	Record
14 Jun 2025	Win	(Spain) Bilal Koudil	ALL STARS KICK BOXING	Alès, France	Decision	3	3:00	83-14-1
12 Apr 2025	Loss	(Ukraine) Rustam Vyntu	Jurassic Fight Night	Lons-le-Saunier, France	TKO (injury)	1		82-14-1
26 Jul 2024	Win	(Spain) Yassine Laamiri	The Fabulous Fight 3	Cogolin, France	Decision	3	3:00	82-13-1
1 Jun 2024	Loss	(Spain) Ayoub El Madjoub	All Star Kickboxing	Alès, France	KO (right cross)	3		81-13-1
12 Aug 2023	Loss	(France) Abdelmalik Lazizi	Gladiator's Boxing Series	La Londe-les-Maures, France	TKO	1		81-12-1
8 Jul 2023	Win	(Spain) Ayoub El Madjoub	Fabulous Fight 2	La Ciotat, France	Decision	3	3:00	81-11-1
24 Jun 2023	Loss	(Italy) Luca Cecchetti	The Night of Kick and Punch – Black Tie Edition	Venaria Reale, Italy	TKO (retirement)	3	3:00	80-11-1
For the WAKO Pro K-1 World bantamweight (-56.4kg) title.
13 May 2023	Loss	(Algeria) Akram Hamidi	Le Choc des Etoiles 7	Châteauneuf-les-Martigues, France	KO (knee to the body)	2	2:14	80-10-1
8 Apr 2023	Win	(Spain) Javier Delgado	Ultimate Fight Night 4	Lons-le-Saunier, France	KO (spinning back kick)	1		80-9-1
10 Dec 2022	Win	(Spain) Daniel Boszo	Tendil Event 4	L'Isle-sur-la-Sorgue, France	Decision	3	3:00	79-9-1
8 Oct 2022	Win	(Morocco) Mohamed Knidil	Box'in Night 4	Nimes, France	KO	2		78-9-1
22 Jul 2022	Win	(Spain) Alexis Sosa	Battle of Saint-Raphaël 8	Saint-Raphaël, France	TKO (punches)	1		77-9-1
11 Jun 2022	Win	(Spain) Jordi Lopez Sampietro	EFC Ultimate Fight Night 3	Lons-le-Saunier, France	Decision	3	3:00	76-9-1
9 Oct 2021	Win	(Spain) Marc Sabaté Peinado	Box'in Night 3	Nimes, France	Decision (unanimous)	3	3:00	75-9-1
18 Sep 2021	Loss	(France) Djany Fiorenti	La Nuit Des Gladiateurs 12	Marseille, France	Decision (unanimous)	3	3:00	74-9-1
29 Jun 2019	Win	(France) Luc Genieys	Gala Du Phoenix 11	Trets, France	Decision (unanimous)	3	3:00	74-8-1
18 May 2019	Win	(Italy) Danilo Bellomo	Master Fight 2	Chalon-sur-Saône, France	TKO	2		73-8-1
30 Mar 2019	Win	(France) Alexis Font	EFC Ultimate Fight Night II	Lons-le-Saunier, France	TKO	1		73-8-1
23 Feb 2019	Win	(France) Djany Fiorenti	Stars Night	Vitrolles, France	TKO (doctor stoppage)	2		72-8-1
Wins the ISKA Featherweight Title.
19 Jan 2019	Win	(France) François Thiel	Nuit Des Gladiateurs 10	Marseille, France	TKO (doctor stoppage)	2		71-8-1
13 Oct 2018	Loss	(France) Djany Fiorenti	World GBC Tour 13	Mazan, France	Decision (unanimous)	3	3:00	70-8-1
15 Sep 2018	Win	(France) Luc Genieys	Battle Of Saint-Raphael 6	Saint-Raphaël, France	Decision (unanimous)	3	3:00	70-7-1
22 Jun 2018	Win	(Algeria) Nordine Aissaoui	A1 World Grand Prix	Alger, Algeria	Decision (unanimous)	3	3:00	69-7-1
10 Feb 2018	Win	(Switzerland) Milan Iseli	Enfusion Live - Phenix Boxing Only	Sallanches, France	Decision (unanimous)	5	3:00	68-7-1
Wins the Enfusion Bantamweight Title.
20 Jan 2018	Win	(Morocco) Hissam Bougadir	Championnat Du Monde K1	Morocco	Decision (unanimous)	5	3:00	67-7-1
Defends the WAKO Bantamweight Title.
9 Dec 2017	Win	(Argentina) Martin Blanco	Kick's Night	Agde, France	Decision (unanimous)	3	3:00	66-7-1
28 Oct 2017	Win	(Italy) Tarik Totts	Aix Fight Tour Niglo	Aix-en-Provence, France	Decision (unanimous)	3	3:00	65-7-1
6 Sep 2017	Loss	(Japan) Eisaku Ogasawara	Rebels.52	Bunkyo, Japan	Decision (unanimous)	5	3:00	64-7-1
Lost the ISKA Bantamweight Title.
30 Jun 2017	Win	(Azerbaijan) Elshad Aleksarov	Monte-Carlo Fighting Trophy	Monaco	Decision (unanimous)	5	3:00	64-6-1
Won the WAKO Bantamweight Title.
26 May 2017	Win	(Spain) Jamal Lahrisi Manzano	Ultimate Fight Night	Le Beausset, France	Decision (unanimous)	3	3:00	63-6-1
6 May 2017	Win	(Switzerland) Milan Iseli	Phenix Boxing Only Edition 5	Saint-Julien-en-Genevois, France	KO	3		62-6-1
8 Apr 2017	Win	(France) Mounir Ouali	XI eme Trophée Des Etoiles	Gardanne, France	KO	1		61-6-1
11 Mar 2017	Win	(Hungary) Laszlo Zako	Power Trophy	Orange, France	TKO	4		60-6-1
Won the ISKA Bantamweight Title.
21 Jan 2017	Win	(France) Olivier Moriano	La Nuit Des Gladiateurs	Marseille, France	TKO	3		59-6-1
10 Dec 2016	Win	(Spain) Samvel Babayan	Full Night X	Agde, France	Decision (unanimous)	3	3:00	58-6-1
19 Nov 2016	Loss	(Algeria) Hakim Hamech	Nuit des Champions 2016	Marseille, France	Decision (unanimous)	3	3:00	57-6-1
8 Oct 2016	Win	(Belgium) Zakaria Miri	World GBC Tour 11	Mazan, France	Decision (unanimous)	3	3:00	57-5-1
17 Sep 2016	Win	(Greece) Manolis Kalistis	Battle Of Saint-Raphael 4	Saint-Raphaël, France	TKO	2		56-5-1
21 May 2016	Win	(Italy) Roberto Bonetti	Xeme Trophée des Etoiles	Aix-en-Provence, France	Decision (unanimous)	3	3:00	55-5-1
30 Apr 2016	Win	(Belgium) Victor Heider	MFC 5	Lons-le-Saunier, France	Decision (unanimous)	3	3:00	54-5-1
13 Feb 2016	Loss	(France) Mathis Dnjanoyan	Stars Night	Vitrolles, France	Decision (unanimous)	3	3:00	53-5-1
21 Jan 2016	Win	(France) Anthony Basilicani	MFC 3	Seyssins, France	Decision (unanimous)	3	3:00	53-4-1
19 Jul 2014	Win	(United States) Romie Adanza	Hot Summer Fights	Cabazon, California, US	Decision (split)	5	3:00	52-4-1
Won the WBC Muaythai International Flyweight Title.
6 Jun 2012	Loss	(Japan) Kenji Kubo	RISE 88	Tokyo, Japan	KO (left hook to the body)	3	0:29	
30 Apr 2011	Loss	(Algeria) Hakim Hamech	K-1 Rules	Monaco	Decision (unanimous)	5	3:00	
For the French National K-1 Title.
Legend: Win Loss Draw/no contest Notes

Amateur kickboxing record
Date	Result	Opponent	Event	Location	Method	Round	Time
2008-10-	Loss	(Ukraine) Serhiy Cherkaskyy	2008 WAKO European Championships, -54 kg Full Contact Tournament Final	Varna, Bulgaria	Decision	3	2:00
Wins the 2008 WAKO European Championships Full Contact -54kg Silver Medal.
Legend: Win Loss Draw/no contest Notes

== See also ==
- List of male kickboxers
