= Astemir Borsov =

Russian kickboxer

- Born: March 16, 1993 (age 33); Nalchik, Russia
- Native name: Астемир Борсов
- Height: 1.68 m (5 ft 6 in)
- Weight: 57 kg (126 lb; 9.0 st)
- Style: Full Contact, Kickboxing
- Stance: Orthodox
- Fighting out of: Maykop, Russia
- Team: Adygea Kickboxing
- Trainer: Kazbek Siyukhov
- Years active: 2011–present

Kickboxing record
- Total: 6
- Wins: 6
- By knockout: 1

Other information
- Boxing record from BoxRec

Astemir Borsov (born 16 March 1993) is a Russian kickboxer. He is the former Glory of Heroes Junior Bantamweight champion and WAKO World K1 Featherweight champion.

Combat Press ranked him in the strawweight top ten between May 2019 and August 2020, as well as in the super flyweight top ten between September 2020 and July 2021.

== Kickboxing career ==
Borsov transitioned to professional kickboxing after a successful amateur career, during which he won six WAKO Amateur World and European medals.

In his first professional fight, Borsov participated in the 2016 Glory of Heroes, "Rise of Heroes" tournament. He beat Liu Xiaoyang by decision in the semi-finals, and Li Xiang by TKO in the finals.

He fought for the WAKO Pro Flyweight K-1 title in 2017, with his opponent being Lucien Gross. Borsov won the fight by a unanimous decision.

He afterwards participated in the Glory of Heroes Junior Bantamweight tournament. He won a unanimous decision against Wang Junguang in the semi-finals, and faced Hakim Hamech in the final match. Borsov won a unanimous decision.

He fought for the WAKO Pro Featherweight title against Luca Cecchetti. Borsov won the fight by a unanimous decision.

== Titles and accomplishments ==
=== Professional ===
- WAKO-Pro
  - 2017 WAKO-Pro K-1 World Flyweight (-54.5 kg) Championship
  - 2019 WAKO-Pro K-1 World Featherweight (-58.2 kg) Championship
- Glory of Heroes
  - 2018 Glory of Heroes -57 kg Championship

=== Amateur ===
- Russian Federation
  - 2014 Russian Kickboxing -57 kg runner-up
  - 2x National Kickboxing -57 kg Champion (2016, 2019)
- World Association of Kickboxing Organizations
  - 2010 W.A.K.O Junior World Championships Low Kick -54 kg (bronze)
  - 2011 W.A.K.O World Championships -54 kg (gold)
  - 2012 W.A.K.O. European Championships K-1 -54 kg (gold)
  - 2013 W.A.K.O. World Championships K-1 -54 kg (gold)
  - 2014 W.A.K.O. European Championships Full Contact -57 kg (bronze)
  - 2015 W.A.K.O. World Championships Full Contact -57 kg (silver)
  - 2016 W.A.K.O. European Championships Full Contact -57 kg (silver)
  - 2017 W.A.K.O. World Championships Full Contact -60 kg (gold)
  - 2019 W.A.K.O. World Championships K-1 -57 kg (bronze)

== Fight record ==
Professional kickboxing record
6 wins (1 (T)KOs), 0 losses, 0 draws, 0 no contests
Date	Result	Opponent	Event	Location	Method	Round	Time
2019-09-07	Win	(Italy) Luca Cecchetti	2019 International Professional Kickboxing Championship in Sakhalin	Yuzhno-Sakhalinsk, Russia	Decision (unanimous)	5	3:00
Wins WAKO Pro K-1 World Featherweight (-58.2kg) title.
2018-01-13	Win	(France) Hakim Hamech	Glory of Heroes: Guangzhou 57 kg Tournament Final	Guangzhou, China	Decision (unanimous)	3	3:00
Wins Glory of Heroes -57kg title.
2017-12-23	Win	(China) Wang Junguang	Glory of Heroes: Jinan, 57 kg Tournament Semi-Finals	Jinan, China	Decision (unanimous)	3	3:00
2017-04-28	Win	(France) Lucien Gross		Beaucaire, France	Decision (unanimous)	5	3:00
Wins the vacant WAKO Pro K-1 World Flyweight (-54.5kg) title.
2016-10-15	Win	(China) Li Xiang	Rise of Heroes 2, Final	Zhangshu, China	TKO	1	
2016-10-15	Win	(China) Liu Xiaoyang	Rise of Heroes 2, Semi-final	Zhangshu, China	Decision (unanimous)	3	3:00
Legend: Win Loss Draw/no contest Notes

Amateur kickboxing record (incomplete)
Date	Result	Opponent	Event	Location	Method	Round	Time
2019-10-22	Loss	(Moldova) Maxim Cazacu	WAKO World Championship, Semi-final	Bosnia and Herzegovina	Decision (split)	3	2:00
Wins 2019 WAKO World Championship K-1 -60kg Bronze Medal.
2019-10-21	Win	(Belarus) Pavel Kishkurna	WAKO World Championship, Quarter-final	Bosnia and Herzegovina	Decision (split)	3	2:00
2019-10-20	Win	(Israel) Guy Mor-Alon	WAKO World Championship, 1/8 Final	Bosnia and Herzegovina	Decision (unanimous)	3	2:00
2019-03-22	Win	(Russia) Mongush Kezhik	Russian Kickboxing Championship	Russia	TKO	3	
2017-11-09	Win	(Kazakhstan) Abzal Dyussupov	2017 WAKO World Championship, Final	Budapest, Hungary	Decision	3	2:00
Wins 2017 WAKO World Championship Full Contact -60kg Gold Medal.
2017-11-08	Win	(United Kingdom) Tyrell Cummins	2017 WAKO World Championship, Semi-final	Budapest, Hungary	Decision (unanimous)	3	2:00
2017-11-07	Win	(Norway) Tommy Macpherson	2017 WAKO World Championship, Quarter-final	Budapest, Hungary	Decision (unanimous)	3	2:00
2017-09-21	Win	(Russia) Narek Babajanian	World Cup Diamond Kickboxing WAKO	Anapa, Russia	Decision (unanimous)	3	2:00
2016-11-19	Loss	(Ukraine) Vladyslav Hyda	2016 WAKO European Championships, Final	Loutraki, Greece	Decision (split)	3	2:00
Wins 2016 WAKO European Championship Full Contact -57kg Silver Medal.
2016-11-18	Win	(Turkey) Emre Karaca	2016 WAKO European Championships, Semi-final	Loutraki, Greece	Decision (unanimous)	3	2:00
2016-04-23	Win	(Russia) Leonid Chebodaev	Russian Amateur Kickboxing Championship	Ulyanovsk, Russia	Decision (unanimous)	3	2:00
2015-11-28	Loss	(Germany) Johannes Wolf	2015 WAKO World Championship, Final	Dublin, Ireland	Decision (split)	3	2:00
Wins 2015 WAKO World Championship Full Contact -57kg Silver Medal.
2015-11-27	Win	(Kazakhstan) Ruslan Bayazitov	2015 WAKO World Championship, Semi-finals	Dublin, Ireland	Decision	3	2:00
2015-11-26	Win	(Brazil) Daniel Mattos	2015 WAKO World Championship, Quarter-finals	Dublin, Ireland	Decision	3	2:00
2014-10	Loss	(Germany) Johannes Wolf	2014 WAKO European Championship, Semi-finals	Bilbao, Spain	Decision (unanimous)	3	2:00
Wins 2014 WAKO European Championship Full Contact -57kg Bronze Medal.
2014-10	Win	(Spain) Tierno Gomez Alvero	2014 WAKO European Championship, Quarter-finals	Bilbao, Spain	Decision (unanimous)	3	2:00
2014-04	Win	(Russia) Maxim Efremov	Russian Amateur Kickboxing Championships	Ulyanovsk, Russia	Decision (unanimous)	3	2:00
2013-10-	Win	(Turkey) Serkan Katici	2013 WAKO World Championship, Final	Guaruja, Brazil	Decision		
Wins 2013 WAKO World Championships K-1 -54kg Gold Medal.
2013-10-	Win	(Italy) Fabrizio Lodde	2013 WAKO World Championship, Semi-finals	Guaruja, Brazil	Decision		
2012-10	Win	(Turkey) Cagdas Yilmaz	2012 WAKO European Championship K-1, Final	Ankara, Turkey	Decision		
Wins the 2012 WAKO European Championships K-1 -54kg Gold Medal.
2012-10	Win	(Belarus) Tsimur Burau	WAKO European Championship K-1, Semi-final	Ankara, Turkey	Decision (unanimous)	3	2:00
2011-10-29	Win	(Mauritius) Fabrice Bauluck	2011 WAKO World Championship, Final	Skopje, Macedonia	Decision	3	2:00
Wins the 2011 WAKO World Championship Low Kick -54kg Gold Medal.
2011-10-28	Win		2011 WAKO World Championship, Semi-final	Skopje, Macedonia	Decision	3	2:00
2010-09-	Loss	(Serbia) Aleksandar Konovalov	2010 WAKO Junior World Championship, Semi-finals	Belgrade, Serbia	Decision		
Wins the 2010 WAKO Junior World Championship Low Kick -54kg Bronze Medal.
2010-09-	Win	(Madagascar) Jean Christian Herinaina	2010 WAKO Junior World Championship, Quarter-finals	Belgrade, Serbia	Decision		
Legend: Win Loss Draw/no contest Notes

== See also ==
- List of male kickboxers
