= Matches of Polish men's volleyball national team conducted by Ferdinando De Giorgi =

List matches of Poland men's national volleyball team conducted by Ferdinando De Giorgi, who was announced a coach of Polish national team on December 16, 2016. Head coach failed to draw conclusions from the defeat in the 2017 European Championships, so PZPS fired Ferdinando De Giorgi on September 20.

Overall
Victories	Defeats
9	8

== Achievements ==
No.		Tournament	Place	Date	Final opponent	Result	Won/Lost
1.	8th	FIVB World League	International round	2 Jun–8 Jul 2017	–	–	4/5
2.	10th	CEV European Championship	Poland	24 Aug–3 Sep 2017	–	–	2/2

== Official matches ==
=== 2017 FIVB World League ===
==== Pool A1 ====
2 June 2017; 17:00	Brazil	2–3	Poland	Adriatic Arena, Pesaro, Italy; Attendance: 4,000; Referees: SHAABAN & WASR MURAWAKA SHIN
2 June 2017; 17:00	(20–25, 25–20, 25–19, 22–25, 8–15)			Adriatic Arena, Pesaro, Italy; Attendance: 4,000; Referees: SHAABAN & WASR MURAWAKA SHIN

3 June 2017; 14:00	Poland	3–1	Italy	Adriatic Arena, Pesaro, Italy; Attendance: 4,500; Referees: SIMONOVIC VLADIMIR (SRB) & SHAABAN NASR (EGY)
3 June 2017; 14:00	(21–25, 25–17, 25–18, 25–23)			Adriatic Arena, Pesaro, Italy; Attendance: 4,500; Referees: SIMONOVIC VLADIMIR (SRB) & SHAABAN NASR (EGY)

4 June 2017; 17:00	Poland	1–3	Iran	Adriatic Arena, Pesaro, Italy; Attendance: 3,200; Referees: SIMONOVIC VLADIMIR (SRB) & MURANAKA SHIN (JAP)
4 June 2017; 17:00	(25–18, 23–25, 23–25, 22–25)			Adriatic Arena, Pesaro, Italy; Attendance: 3,200; Referees: SIMONOVIC VLADIMIR (SRB) & MURANAKA SHIN (JAP)

==== Pool E1 ====
9 June 2017; 19:10	Bulgaria	3–2	Poland	Palace of Culture and Sports, Varna, Bulgaria; Attendance: 5,500; Referees: Ramirez O. (DOM) & Concia F. (ARG)
9 June 2017; 19:10	(25–16, 20–25, 19–25, 25–23, 16–14)			Palace of Culture and Sports, Varna, Bulgaria; Attendance: 5,500; Referees: Ramirez O. (DOM) & Concia F. (ARG)

10 June 2017; 15:40	Brazil	3–1	Poland	Palace of Culture and Sports, Varna, Bulgaria; Attendance: 1,800; Referees: Saltalippi F. (ITA) & Ramirez Y. (DOM)
10 June 2017; 15:40	(25–21, 25–20, 17–25, 25–19)			Palace of Culture and Sports, Varna, Bulgaria; Attendance: 1,800; Referees: Saltalippi F. (ITA) & Ramirez Y. (DOM)

11 June 2017; 15:40	Poland	3–1	Canada	Palace of Culture and Sports, Varna, Bulgaria; Attendance: 900; Referees: Ramirez Y. (DOM) & Concia F. (ARG)
11 June 2017; 15:40	(25–21, 27–25, 20–25, 25–19)			Palace of Culture and Sports, Varna, Bulgaria; Attendance: 900; Referees: Ramirez Y. (DOM) & Concia F. (ARG)

==== Pool H1 ====
15 June 2017; 20:25	Poland	0–3	Russia	Spodek, Katowice, Poland; Attendance: 8,500; Referees: Caçador Anderson (BRA) & Gradinski Goran (SRB)
15 June 2017; 20:25	(22–25, 17–25, 21–25)			Spodek, Katowice, Poland; Attendance: 8,500; Referees: Caçador Anderson (BRA) & Gradinski Goran (SRB)

17 June 2017; 21:00	Poland	3–0	Iran	Atlas Arena, Łódź, Poland; Attendance: 8,000; Referees: Pasquali Fabrizio (ITA) & Caçador Anderson (BRA)
17 June 2017; 21:00	(25–17, 25–18, 25–22)			Atlas Arena, Łódź, Poland; Attendance: 8,000; Referees: Pasquali Fabrizio (ITA) & Caçador Anderson (BRA)

18 June 2017; 20:25	Poland	1–3	United States	Atlas Arena, Łódź, Poland; Attendance: 7,800; Referees: Gradinski Goran (SRB) & Pasquali Fabrizio (ITA)
18 June 2017; 20:25	(31–29, 17–25, 25–27, 20–25)			Atlas Arena, Łódź, Poland; Attendance: 7,800; Referees: Gradinski Goran (SRB) & Pasquali Fabrizio (ITA)

=== 2017 European Championship ===
- All times are Central European Summer Time (UTC+02:00)

==== Pool A ====
24 August 2017; 20:30	Poland	0–3	Serbia	National Stadium, Warsaw, Poland; Attendance: 65,407; Referees: ZENOVICH Andrey (RUS) - SALTALIPPI Fabrizio (ITA)
24 August 2017; 20:30	(22–25, 22–25, 20–25)			National Stadium, Warsaw, Poland; Attendance: 65,407; Referees: ZENOVICH Andrey (RUS) - SALTALIPPI Fabrizio (ITA)

26 August 2017; 20:30	Poland	3–0	Finland	Ergo Arena, Gdańsk, Poland; Attendance: 9,500; Referees: SALTALIPPI Fabrizio (ITA) - COLLADOS Fabrice (FRA)
26 August 2017; 20:30	(25–23, 25–21, 25–19)			Ergo Arena, Gdańsk, Poland; Attendance: 9,500; Referees: SALTALIPPI Fabrizio (ITA) - COLLADOS Fabrice (FRA)

28 August 2017; 20:30	Poland	3–0	Estonia	Ergo Arena, Gdańsk, Poland; Attendance: 9,500; Referees: SALTALIPPI Fabrizio (ITA) - KELLENBERGER Jörg
28 August 2017; 20:30	(25–21, 26–24, 25–22)			Ergo Arena, Gdańsk, Poland; Attendance: 9,500; Referees: SALTALIPPI Fabrizio (ITA) - KELLENBERGER Jörg

==== Playoffs ====
30 August 2017; 20:30	Poland	0–3	Slovenia	Tauron Arena, Kraków, Poland; Attendance: 8,681; Referees: ADLER Laszlo - GEROTHODOROS Epaminondas
30 August 2017; 20:30	(21–25, 21–25, 19–25)			Tauron Arena, Kraków, Poland; Attendance: 8,681; Referees: ADLER Laszlo - GEROTHODOROS Epaminondas

== Friendly matches ==
=== 2017 ===
20 May 2017; 20:00	Poland	3–0	Iran	Spodek, Katowice
20 May 2017; 20:00	(25–19, 25–19, 25–23)			Spodek, Katowice

==== 2017 Memoriał Huberta Jerzego Wagnera ====
11 August 2017; 20:30	Poland	3–2	France	Tauron Arena, Kraków
11 August 2017; 20:30	(25–22, 16–25, 20–25, 25–22, 13–15); Relation			Tauron Arena, Kraków

12 August 2017; 15:00	Poland	3–0	Canada	Tauron Arena, Kraków
12 August 2017; 15:00	(36–34, 25–20, 26–24); Relation			Tauron Arena, Kraków

13 August 2017; 18:00	Poland	3–2	Russia	Tauron Arena, Kraków
13 August 2017; 18:00	(16–25, 19–25, 25–20, 25–22, 15–12); Relation			Tauron Arena, Kraków
