= Djany Fiorenti =

- Born: 16 December 1993 (age 32); Berre-l'Étang, France
- Height: 1.70 m (5 ft 7 in)
- Weight: 60 kg (130 lb; 9.4 st)
- Division: Flyweight
- Style: Kickboxing
- Stance: Orthodox
- Fighting out of: Vitrolles, France
- Team: Dojo Fudo Shin
- Trainer: Jeremy Payan
- Years active: 2014 - present

Professional boxing record
- Total: 3
- Wins: 3
- Losses: 0

Kickboxing record
- Total: 40
- Wins: 31
- By knockout: 1
- Losses: 8
- By knockout: 1
- Draws: 1

Other information
- Boxing record from BoxRec

Djany Fiorenti is a French kickboxer. He is a former WKN, ISKA K-1 World lightweight champion as well as a former WAKO-Pro Low kick Lightweight World champion.

Combat Press ranked him as the #10 Flyweight in the world between July 2020 and December 2020.

== Boxing career ==
Fiorenti made his boxing debut against fellow debutant Ion Ursu on October 21, 2021. He won the fight by unanimous decision. Fiorenti next faced Swan Barteau on 5 March 2022. He won the fight by decision. Fiorenti faced Oilyd Akkouh in his third professional boxing bout on October 22, 2022, and once again won by decision.

== Kickboxing career ==
In his debut fight, Djany fought Anthony Mardaye for the FMDA Muay Thai National Flyweight title. He won the fight by decision.

Over the next four years, Fiorenti amassed a 13-1 record, with his sole loss coming in his second pro fight, to Rayan Mekki. He then entered the Wu Lin Feng 2018 60 kg tournament. He defeated Zhu Shuai by decision in the quarterfinals, but lost a decision to Hirotaka Asahisa in the semifinals. Following this loss, he went on a 3-1-1 run, with a notable win over Franck Gross.

Fiorenti participated in the 2019 Partouche Kickboxing Tour tournament. He won a unanimous decision against Yassine Hamlaoui in the semifinals, and a majority decision against Gebril Chaibi in the finals.

He was scheduled to fight Ayoub El Khaidar for the Arena Fight inaugural Flyweight title. He won the fight by unanimous decision.

After winning the Arena Fight title, he fought and won a rematch with Hicham Moujtahid, and won a decision against Khaiam Khudoiberdiev.

He was scheduled to defend his Arena Fight title against Elias Mahmoudi during AFC 2, but the fight was later postponed due to the COVID-19 pandemic.

Fiorenti was scheduled to face Franck Gross at La Nuit Des Gladiateurs 12 on September 18, 2021. He won the fight by decision.

Fiorenti was scheduled to face Tuzo Cruz at Empire Fight - Vikings Edition in a 60 kg bout. He lost the fight by decision.

Fiorenti was scheduled to participate in a four-man EMP Fight Night 60 kg tournament. He won the tournament after defeating Rémi Parra by decision in the semifinals, and Aanas Azizoun by decision in the finals.

Fiorenti faced Silviu Vitez at Nuit Des Champions 29 on November 19, 2022. He lost the fight by an extra round decision.

== Championships and accomplishments ==
- Fédération de Muaythaï et Disciplines Associées
  - 2014 FMDA Muay Thai France -57 kg Champion
- Partouche Kickboxing Tour
  - 2019 Partouche Kickboxing Tour Tournament winner
- Arena Fight
  - 2019 Arena Fight K-1 -60 kg Champion
- World Kickboxing Network
  - 2023 WKN K-1 World -60 kg Champion
- World Association of Kickboxing Organizations
  - 2024 WAKO-Pro Low Kick World Lightweight (-60 kg) Champion
- International Sport Kickboxing Association
  - 2025 ISKA K-1 World Lightweight (-61 kg) Champion

== Kickboxing record ==
Professional kickboxing record
31 wins (1 (T)KOs), 7 losses, 1 draw
Date	Result	Opponent	Event	Location	Method	Round	Time
2025-06-20	Win	(Spain) Sandro Martin	Fabulous Fight 4	Cogolin, France	Decision (unanimous)	5	3:00
Wins the vacant ISKA K-1 World Lightweight (-61 kg) title.
2024-07-26	Win	(Portugal) Diogo Silva	Fabulous Fight 3	Cogolin, France	Decision (unanimous)	5	3:00
Wins the vacant WAKO Pro Low Kick World Lightweight (-60 kg) title.
2024-06-29	Loss	(Moldova) Maximus Bejenuta	Mayor's Cup Editia IV	Chișinău, Moldova	Decision (split)	5	3:00
For the interim WAKO Pro K-1 World -62.2kg title.
2023-11-18	Loss	(Romania) Silviu Vitez	La Nuit Des Champions 30	Marseille, France	Decision (majority)	5	3:00
For La Nuit des Champions and WAKO-Pro K-1 World Lightweight (-60 kg) titles.
2023-07-08	Win	(Latvia) Arseniy Nikolajev	Fabulous Fight 2	La Ciotat, France	Decision (unanimous)	5	3:00
Wins the vacant WKN K-1 World -60kg title.
2023-05-13	Loss	(France) Rémi Parra	Le Choc des Etoiles 7	Châteauneuf-les-Martigues, France	Decision (unanimous)	5	3:00
For the WAKO-Pro K-1 World -62.2kg title.
2023-02-18	Win	(France) Luc Genieys	Stars Night 2023	Vitrolles, France	Decision	3	3:00
2022-11-19	Loss	(Romania) Silviu Vitez	La Nuit Des Champions 29	Marseille, France	Ext. R. decision (majority)	4	3:00
2022-05-21	Win	(France) Clément Adrover	Stars Night 2022	Vitrolles, France	Decision	3	3:00
2021-11-21	Win	(France) Aanas Azizoun	EMP Fight Night, Tournament Finals	Brussels, Belgium	Decision	3	3:00
Wins EMP Fight Night 60kg Tournament.
2021-11-21	Win	(France) Rémi Parra	EMP Fight Night, Tournament Semifinals	Brussels, Belgium	Decision	3	3:00
2021-10-02	Loss	(Mexico) Tuzo Cruz	Empire Fight - Vikings Edition	Montbéliard, France	Decision	5	3:00
For the Empire Fight Kickboxing -62kg Title.
2021-09-18	Win	(France) Franck Gross	La Nuit Des Gladiateurs 12	Marseille, France	Decision	3	3:00
2020-02-22	Win	(Russia) Khaiam Khudoiberdiev	Stars Night	Vitrolles, France	Decision (unanimous)	3	3:00
2019-11-16	Win	(Belgium) Hicham Moujtahid	La Nuit des Champions	Marseille, France	Decision (majority)	3	3:00
2019-06-08	Win	(France) Ayoub El Khaidar	Arena Fight	Aix-en-Provence, France	Decision (unanimous)	5	3:00
Wins the inaugural Arena Fight K-1 -60kg title.
2019-04-06	Win	(France) Gebril Chaibi	Partouche Kickboxing Tour, Final	Hyères, France	Decision (majority)	3	3:00
2019-04-06	Win	(France) Yassine Hamlaoui	Partouche Kickboxing Tour, Semi Final	Hyères, France	Decision (unanimous)	3	3:00
2019-02-23	Loss	(France) Franck Gross	Stars Night	Vitrolles, France	TKO (doctor stoppage)	2	
2019-01-19	Win	(France) Abdel Cherragi	Nuit Des Gladiateurs 10	Marseille, France	Decision (split)	3	3:00
2018-11-24	Draw	(Belgium) Hicham Moujtahid	La Nuit des Champions	Marseille, France	Decision	3	3:00
2018-10-13	Win	(France) Franck Gross	World GBC Tour 13	Mazan, France	Decision (unanimous)	3	3:00
2018-07-22	Win	(France) Vatsana Sedone	Le Choc des Gladiateurs	Le Lavandou, France	Decision (unanimous)	3	3:00
2018-03-10	Loss	(Japan) Hirotaka Asahisa	Wu Lin Feng 2018: -60kg World Championship Tournament, Semi Finals	Jiaozuo, China	unanimous	3	3:00
2018-03-10	Win	(China) Zhu Shuai	Wu Lin Feng 2018: -60kg World Championship Tournament, Quarter Finals	Jiaozuo, China	Decision	3	3:00
2018-02-24	Win	(France) Ahmed Moufti	Stars Night	Vitrolles, France	Decision	3	3:00
2017-11-25	Win	(France) Yassine Hamlaoui	Nuit des Champions	Marseille, France	Decision (unanimous)	3	3:00
2017-10-14	Win	(Switzerland) Nabiyom Tefsai	World GBC Tour 12	Mazan, France	Decision	3	3:00
2017-07-01	Win	(Hungary) Alex Gonczi	Gala du Phenix Muaythai 9	Trets, France	Decision (unanimous)	3	3:00
2017-06-03	Win	(Italy) Pulumb Isteri	Cavalaire Kickboxing Show 2	France	Decision	3	3:00
2017-05-13	Win	(France) Mathis Djanoyan	Octogone	Marseille, France	Decision	3	3:00
2017-04-22	Win	(Hungary) Alex Gonczi	Simply The Boxe	France	TKO	1	
2017-03-11	Win	(France) Islem Hamech	Ultimate Fight 3	France	Decision (unanimous)	3	3:00
2016-12-17	Win	(Belgium) Deniz Demirkapu	The Warriors II	France	Decision	3	3:00
2016-10-08	Win	(France) Antonin Bohbot	World GBC Tour 11	Mazan, France	Decision	3	3:00
2016-06-04	Win	(France) Laurent Conte	2eme Trophée Nice Kick Boxing Aéroport	Nice, France	Decision	3	3:00
2016-04-23	Win	(France) Laurent Conte	Simply The Boxe - Space Edition	France	Decision (majority)	3	3:00
2015-10-10	Win	(France) Mathis Djanoyan	TK2 World Max	Marseille, France	Decision	5	3:00
2014-06-07	Loss	(France) Rayan Mekki	Gala du Phenix Muaythai 6	Trets, France	Decision	5	3:00
For the FFSCDA Muay Thai National -57kg title.
2014-05-31	Win	(France) Anthony Mardaye	Open des Yvelines de Muay Thai	Trappes, France	Decision	5	3:00
Wins FMDA Muay Thai National -57kg title.
Legend: Win Loss Draw/no contest Notes

== Boxing record ==
3 fights	3 wins	0 losses
By decision	3	0

No.	Result	Record	Opponent	Type	Round, time	Date	Location	Notes
3	Win	3–0	(France) Oilyd Akkouh	PTS	4	22 Oct 2022	Gymnase Louis Tirman, Charleville-Mézières, France	
2	Win	2–0	(France) Swan Barteau	UD	6	5 Mar 2022	Complexe sportif du pilori, Campbon, France	
1	Win	1–0	(Romania) Ion Ursu	UD	4	21 Oct 2021	Palais de la Bourse, Marseille, France	

== See also ==
- List of male kickboxers
