= Silviu Vitez =

Romanian Muay Thai kickboxer

- Born: February 7, 1995 (age 31); Câmpia Turzii, Romania
- Other names: Hitman
- Height: 170 cm (5 ft 7 in)
- Weight: 60 kg (130 lb; 9.4 st)
- Style: Kickboxing, Muay Thai
- Stance: Orthodox
- Fighting out of: Noia, Spain
- Team: Club de Lucha Noia
- Years active: 2016–present

Kickboxing record
- Total: 71
- Wins: 52
- By knockout: 14
- Losses: 16
- By knockout: 5
- Draws: 3
- Last updated on: March 17, 2023

Silviu Vitez (born February 7, 1995) is a Romanian-Spanish Muay Thai kickboxer. He is the current WAKO-Pro World K-1 Lightweight champion. As of December 2022, Vitez is ranked the #8 super bantamweight in the world by Beyond Kickboxing.

== Career ==
On December 16, 2017 Vitez faced Mohamed al Mohammadi at Fight Club Slam. He won the fight by decision.

Vitez faced Ryusei Ashizawa in the quarterfinals of the 2018 K-1 featherweight World Grand Prix, held at K-1 World GP 2018: 2nd Featherweight Championship Tournament on June 17, 2018. He lost the fight by a first-round technical knockout.

On October 6, 2018 Vitez defeated Cristian Rodriguez Rojo by knockout in the first round at Enfusion Talents 59.

Vitez faced Moha Salih for the Spanish National Muay Thai -58 kg title at Cinturón Profesional MTR on November 17, 2018. He won the fight by unanimous decision. He made his first title defense against Daniel Botella at MFC Showdown 002 on December 25, 2018. He won the fight by a second-round knockout.

In 2019 he moved from Madrid to Noia in Galicia where he started to train under the supervision of the former legend Moises Hermo in his team Club de Lucha de Noia where lately he accomplish his biggest victories.

His two fight winning streak was stopped by Brandon Vieira at Divonne Muaythai Challenge 4 on March 16, 2019, who beat him by unanimous decision. Vitez next faced Juan Mario at MFC 003 on May 18, 2019. He lost the fight by unanimous decision.

After capturing the ISKA European Muaythai at Noia Fighters 4 on February 8, 2020, with a unanimous decision win over Diogo Silva, Vitez returned to MFC. He notched two unanimous decision victories, over Lusimi Salar on August 1 and Miguel Brito on September 12, 2020, before being booked to face Alex Dass at MFC 012 on June 5, 2021. He won the fight by unanimous decision. Vitez was then booked to face Richi Álvarez at MFC 014: Showdown on September 6, 2021. He won the fight by unanimous decision.

Vitez faced Fabio Loisi for the vacant WAKO-Pro World K-1 lightweight title at MFC 022 on August 6, 2022. He captured the vacant title by split decision.

Vitez faced the former Arena Fight -60 kg champion Djany Fiorenti at Nuit Des Championes 29 on November 19, 2022. He won the fight by decision, after an extra fourth round was contested.

Vitez was booked to face Darren Rolland in the semifinals of the one-day four-man MFC tournament, held at MFC 025 on December 3, 2022. He lost the fight by a second-round technical knockout.

Vitez made his first WAKO-Pro K-1 World Lightweight (-60 kg) title defense against Djany Fiorenti at La Nuit Des Champions 30 on November 18, 2023. He retained the title by unanimous decision.

=== One Championship ===
Vitez faced Yodlekpet Or. Pitisak on January 27, 2023, at ONE Friday Fights 2. He lost the fight via technical knockout after the doctor stopped the fight due to a cut.

Vitez faced Saeksan Or. Kwanmuang at ONE Friday Fights 9: Eersel vs. Sinsamut 2 on March 17, 2023. He lost the fight by unanimous decision.

== Championships and accomplishments ==
- La Nuit des Champions
  - 2023 La Nuit des Champions K-1 -60 kg Champion
- World Association of Kickboxing Organizations
  - 2022 WAKO-Pro World K-1 Lightweight (-60 kg) Championship
    - One successful title defense
- Muay Thai Grand Prix
  - 2021 MTGP European -61 kg Championship
- International Sport Karate Association
  - 2019 ISKA Intercontinental Muaythai Featherweight (-57 kg) Championship
  - 2020 ISKA European Muaythai Super Featherweight (-59 kg) Championship
- Kickboxing Romania Awards
  - 2024 Muaythai Fighter of the Year

== Muay Thai and Kickboxing record ==
Professional Muay Thai and Kickboxing record
52 Wins (14 (T)KO's), 16 Losses, 3 Draws, 0 No Contests
Date	Result	Opponent	Event	Location	Method	Round	Time
2026-10-03	Win	(Italy) Riccardo Cristiani	EFA Championship 2	Sofia, Bulgaria	TKO	2	
2025-06-06	Loss	(Thailand) Phetsukumvit Boybangna	ONE Friday Fights 111, Lumpinee Stadium	Bangkok, Thailand	TKO (Punches)	2	1:40
2025-05-02	Win	(Japan) Tomoki Sato	ONE Friday Fights 106, Lumpinee Stadium	Bangkok, Thailand	TKO (doctor stoppage)	2	1:57
2024-11-16	Loss	(France) Fabio Loisi	La Nuit des Champions 31	Marseille, France	Decision (Unanimous)	5	3:00
Loses La Nuit des Champions -60 kg title.
2024-10-18	Loss	(Thailand) Panpayak Jitmuangnon	ONE Friday Fights 83, Lumpinee Stadium	Bangkok, Thailand	Decision (Unanimous)	3	3:00
2024-05-17	Loss	(Japan) Ayumu Kimura	ONE Friday Fights 63, Lumpinee Stadium	Bangkok, Thailand	Decision (Unanimous)	3	3:00
2024-03-16	Loss	(Belarus) Daniil Yermolenka	Kun Khmer Mattrid, Final	Cambodia	Decision	3	3:00
2024-03-16	Win	(Cambodia) San Kun Khmer	Kun Khmer Mattrid, Semifinals	Cambodia	Decision	3	3:00
2024-01-06	Win	(Brazil) Alex Sandro	Kun Khmer Grand Champion	Cambodia	Decision	3	3:00
2023-11-18	Win	(France) Djany Fiorenti	La Nuit Des Champions 30	Marseille, France	Decision (Majority)	5	3:00
Wins the vacant La Nuit des Champions -60 kg title and defends the WAKO-Pro K-1 World Lightweight (-60 kg) title.
2023-09-10	Loss	(Cambodia) Chhut Sereyvannthorng	Kun Khmer Grand Champion	Cambodia	Decision	3	3:00
2023-08-25	Loss	(Thailand) Kongklai AnnyMuayThai	ONE Friday Fights 30, Lumpinee Stadium	Bangkok, Thailand	TKO (Knees)	2	2:42
2023-06-30	Win	(Australia) River Daz	ONE Friday Fights 23, Lumpinee Stadium	Bangkok, Thailand	Decision (Unanimous)	3	3:00
2023-03-17	Loss	(Thailand) Saeksan Or. Kwanmuang	ONE Friday Fights 9: Eersel vs. Sinsamut 2	Bangkok, Thailand	Decision (Unanimous)	3	3:00
2023-01-27	Loss	(Thailand) Yodlekpet Or. Pitisak	ONE Friday Fights 2, Lumpinee Stadium	Bangkok, Thailand	TKO (Doctor stoppage/cut)	2	2:08
2022-12-03	Loss	(France) Darren Rolland	MFC 025, Tournament Semifinal	Ponferrada, Spain	TKO (Doctor stoppage/cut)	1	3:00
2022-11-19	Win	(France) Djany Fiorenti	La Nuit Des Champions 29	Marseille, France	Ext. R. Decision (Unanimous)	4	3:00
2022-08-06	Win	(France) Fabio Loisi	MFC 022	Noia, Spain	Decision (Split)	5	3:00
Won the vacant WAKO-Pro World K-1 Lightweight (-60 kg) title.
2022-03-19	Loss	(Italy) Luca Cecchetti	TAF Night	Meda, Italy	Decision	3	3:00
2022-02-05	Win	(Portugal) Frederico Cordeiro	HMF Custom Fighters	Madrid, Spain	Decision	3	3:00
2021-11-13	Win	(United States) Sean Climaco	Fight Masters, Final	Acapulco, Mexico	Decision		
2021-11-13	Win	(Poland) Łukasz Kubiak	Fight Masters, Semi Final	Acapulco, Mexico			
2021-10-10	Win	(France) Simon Robyn	Muay Thai Grand Prix	Paris, France	TKO	4	
Won the MTGP European -61 kg title.
2021-09-06	Win	(Spain) Ricardo Álvarez	MFC 014: Showdown	Ponferrada, Spain	Decision (Unanimous)	5	3:00
2021-08-21	Win	(Portugal) Diogo Silva	Noia Fighters 4	Noia, Spain	Decision (Unanimous)	5	3:00
Won the ISKA European Muaythai Super Featherweight (-59 kg) title.
2021-06-05	Win	(Spain) Alex Dass	MFC 012	Ponferrada, Spain	Decision (Unanimous)	5	3:00
2020-09-12	Win	(Spain) Miguel Brito	MFC 009	Ponferrada, Spain	Decision (Unanimous)	3	3:00
2020-08-01	Win	(Spain) Lusimi Salar	MFC 008	Ponferrada, Spain	Decision (Unanimous)	3	3:00
2020-02-08	Win	(Portugal) Nuno Furtado	K1 SLAM Gold Edition 4	Bilbao, Spain	Decision (Unanimous)	3	3:00
2019-12-21	Loss	(Spain) Manu Gómez	MFC 005	Ponferrada, Spain	Decision	3	3:00
2019-09-14	Loss	(Spain) Juan Mario	MFC 003	Ponferrada, Spain	Decision	3	3:00
2019-08-11	Win	(Thailand) Widsanuporn Sor Jor Toipadrew	Max Muay Thai	Pattaya, Thailand	TKO (Punches)	2	1:55
2019-07-14	Draw	(Thailand) Petchsila Por.Pattara	Max Muaythai	Pattaya, Thailand	Decision	3	3:00
2019-06-22	Win	(Spain) Jaime Roldan	Lion Fighters XII	Guadalajara, Spain	Decision	3	3:00
2019-04-20	Win	(Belgium) Nick De Blaise	Noia Fighters 3	Ponferrada, Spain	Decision	5	3:00
Won the ISKA Intercontinental Muaythai Featherweight (-57 kg) title.
2019-03-16	Loss	(France) Brandon Vieira	Divonne Muaythai Challenge 4	Divonne-les-Bains, France	Decision (Unanimous)	3	3:00
2018-12-15	Win	(Spain) Daniel Botella	MFC Showdown 002	Ponferrada, Spain	KO	2	
Defends the Spanish National Muay Thai -58 kg title.
2018-11-17	Win	(Spain) Moha Salih	Cinturón Profesional MTR	Madrid, Spain	Decision (Unanimous)	3	3:00
Won the Spanish National Muay Thai -58 kg title.
2018-10-06	Win	(Spain) Cristian Rodriguez Rojo	Enfusion Talents #59	Madrid, Spain	TKO (3 Knockdowns)	1	
2018-08-26	Win	(Thailand) Boonmark Petchasira	Max Muay Thai	Pattaya, Thailand	Decision	3	3:00
2018-06-17	Loss	(Japan) Ryusei Ashizawa	K-1 World GP 2018: 2nd Featherweight Championship Tournament, Quarter Finals	Saitama, Japan	TKO (Ref. Stoppage/Punches)	1	1:28
2018-02-02	Draw	(Thailand) Denkhongchai Dabransarakham	MUAY XTREME	Bangkok, Thailand	Decision	3	3:00
2017-12-16	Win	(Spain) Mohamed Mohammadi	Fight Club Slam	Leganés, Spain	Decision (Unanimous)	5	3:00
2017-10-21	Win	(Spain) Dennis Lara	Muay Thai Revolution VIII	Madrid, Spain	Decision	3	3:00
2017-09-30	Win	(Spain) Hamza Boussalham		Campo Real, Spain	Decision	3	3:00
2017-06-30	Draw	(Spain) Hamza Boussalham	Boxeo - Muay Thai	Colmenar Viejo, Spain	Decision	3	3:00
2017-06-10	Win	(Spain) Antonio Cerdeira	K1 Cieza II Edicion	Cieza, Murcia, Spain	TKO (Doctor stoppage)	1	3:00
2017-06-03	Win	(Spain) Jose Antonio	Muay Thai Revolution VII	Madrid, Spain	TKO (Knees)	1	
2017-03-25	Win	(Spain) Miguel Angel	Muay Thai Revolution VI	Madrid, Spain	TKO (Referee stoppage)	1	
2017-01-14	Win	(Spain) Andrés Leal	Muay Thai Revolution V	Madrid, Spain	Decision (Unanimous)	4	2:00
2016-11-26	Win	(Spain) Adrian Canosa	Invencibles VI	Getafe, Spain	TKO (Doctor stoppage)	1	1:20
Legend: Win Loss Draw/No contest Notes

Amateur Kickboxing record
Date	Result	Opponent	Event	Location	Method	Round	Time
2016-06-11	Win	(Spain) Juanra Martin	1FIGHT - K1 CUP Amateur Series, Final	Madrid, Spain	Decision		
2016-06-11	Win	(Spain) Angel Cabezas	1FIGHT - K1 CUP Amateur Series, Semi Final	Madrid, Spain	Decision		
Legend: Win Loss Draw/No contest Notes

== Mixed martial arts record ==
Professional record breakdown
1 match	0 wins	1 loss
By knockout	0	1
By submission	0	0
By decision	0	0

Res.	Record	Opponent	Method	Event	Date	Round	Time	Location	Notes
Loss	0–1	Martin Alonso	TKO (punches)	SCC 11: The Challenge	9 July 2022	1	1:40	Tenerife, Spain	Bantamweight debut.

== See also ==
- List of male kickboxers
