= Luca Cecchetti =

Italian kickboxer

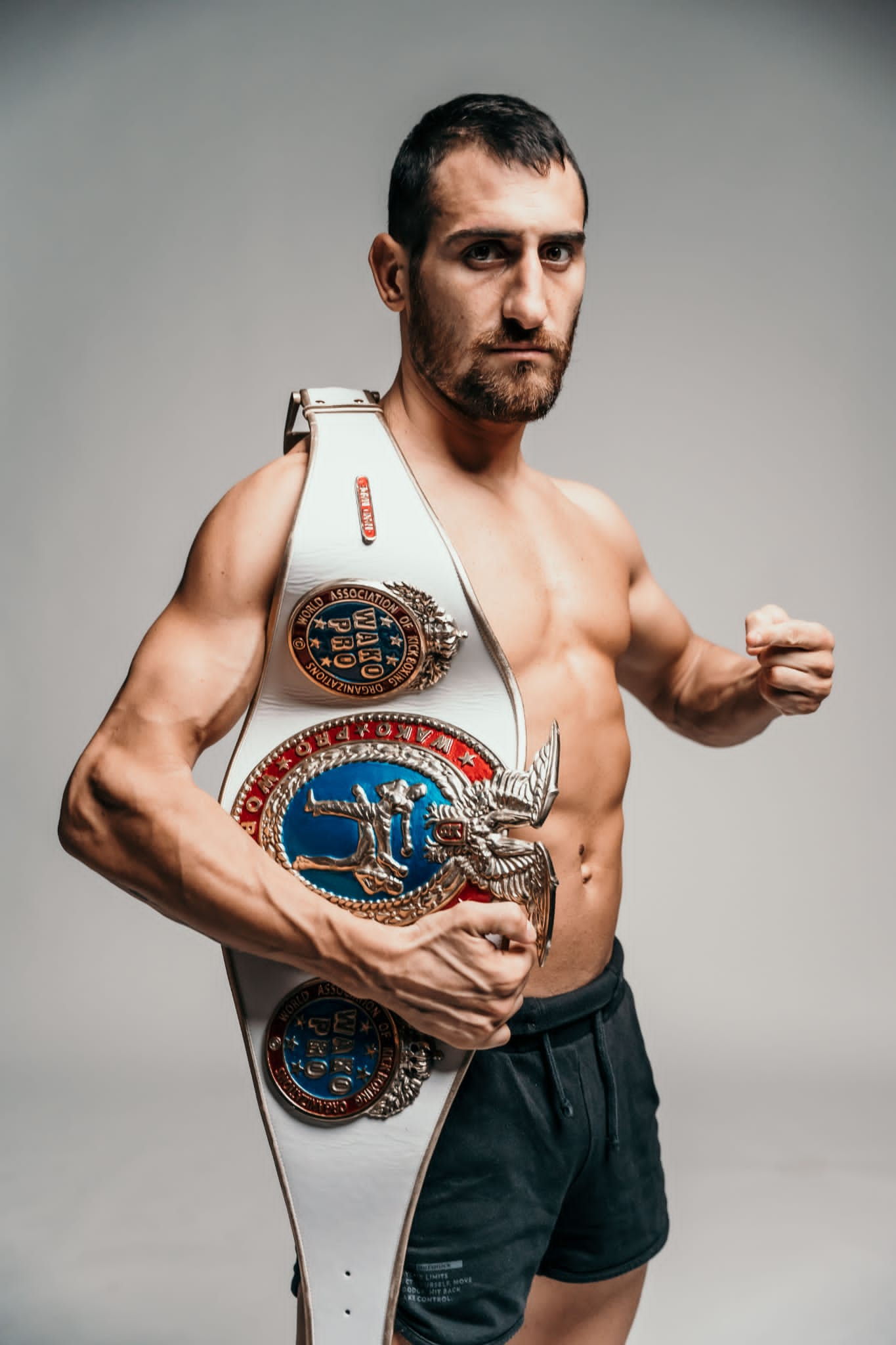
- Luca Cecchetti Ph by Giuseppe Gallo
- Born: November 24, 1990 (age 35); Meda, Italy
- Other names: The Sniper
- Height: 1.68 m (5 ft 6 in)
- Weight: 58 kg (128 lb; 9.1 st)
- Style: Kickboxing
- Stance: Southpaw
- Fighting out of: Milan, Italy
- Team: Kick and Punch
- Trainer: Angelo Valente

Kickboxing record
- Total: 52
- Wins: 46
- By knockout: 11
- Losses: 6

Luca Cecchetti is an Italian kickboxer. He is the current WAKO-Pro K-1 World Bantamweight champion.

As of July 2023 he was the #10 ranked -58 kg kickboxer in the world by Beyond Kickboxing.

== Career ==
Cecchetti was scheduled to face Roberto Pizzagalli at Ring Mania 3 for the WKO Pro Full Contact Italian title. He won the fight by decision.

Cecchetti was scheduled to challenge Tito Macias for the vacant WAKO-Pro K-1 World Featherweight title on June 24, 2017, at The Night Of Kick And Punch 7 event in Milan, Italy. He won the fight by decision after five rounds.

Cecchetti successfully defended his title on October 10, 2017, when he defeated Krzysztof Olszewski by unanimous decision at D-FIGHT in Madone, Italy. For his second defense Cecchetti rematched Tito Macias in Ponferrada, Spain on December 16, 2017. He won the fight by decision once again.

After an eleven months absence due to a hand injury Cecchetti was scheduled to make his return on December 15, 2018, against Nicolas Rivas in a non-title fight at The Night of Kick and Punch 9 in Milan, Italy. He won the bout by decision.

Cecchetti was scheduled to face Pietro Doorje at La Notte Dei Campioni on May 11, 2019, in a non-title bout. He won the fight by decision.

On September 7, 2019, Cecchetti failed to defend his WAKO Pro Featherweight title against Astemir Borsov in Yuzhno-Sakhalinsk, Russia. Borsov won the fight by a unanimous decision.

On October 12, 2019, Cecchetti rematched Alex Avogadro at Bellator Kickboxing 12. He won the fight by technical knockout in the first round due to doctor stoppage. Avogadro's left eye completely closed after Cecchetti landed a flying knee.

On March 19, 2022, Cecchetti defeated Silviu Vitez by decision at the inaugural The Art of Fighting series of event in Meda, Italy.

Cecchetti regained the world champion status when he defeated Maxim Cazacu by technical knockout in the fourth round for the vacant WAKO-Pro World bantamweight title on June 18, 2022, at The Night of Kick and Punch 12.

Cecchetti made the first defense of his WAKO Pro Bantamweight world title on June 24, 2023, at The Night of Kick and Punch Black Tie Edition against former world champion Franck Gross. Cecchetti won the fight by doctor stoppage in the third round after inflicting a cut near the eye of his opponent.

=== ONE Championship/K-1 ===
Cecchetti made his ONE Championship promotional debut against Huo Xiaolong at ONE Friday Fights 31 on September 1, 2023. He won the bout via unanimous decision.

Cecchetti faced the three-time K-1 Super Bantamweight (-55kg) title challenger Masashi Kumura at K-1 World MAX 2024 - World Tournament Opening Round on March 20, 2024. He lost the fight by majority decision, with scores of 30–30, 30–29 and 30–29.

== Titles and accomplishments ==
- WAKO-Pro
  - 2015 WAKO-Pro Full-Contact Italy Championship
  - 2017 WAKO-Pro K-1 Featherweight (-58.2 kg) World Championship (three defenses)
  - 2022 WAKO-Pro K-1 Bantamweight (-56.4 kg) World Championship

== Fight record ==
Professional Kickboxing Record
46 Wins (11 (T)KO's), 5 Losses, 0 Draw, 0 No Contest
Date	Result	Opponent	Event	Location	Method	Round	Time
2026-09-19	Win	(France) Gabin Kamdoum	Pure Ascension	Milan, Italy	Decision	3	3:00
2026-04-18	Win	(Morocco) Nabil Tassa	Pure Origin	Milan, Italy	KO (Low kick)	1	
2024-03-20	Loss	(Japan) Masashi Kumura	K-1 World MAX 2024 - World Tournament Opening Round	Tokyo, Japan	Decision (Majority)	3	3:00
2023-09-01	Win	(China) Huo Xiaolong	ONE Friday Fights 31, Lumpinee Stadium	Bangkok, Thailand	Decision (Unanimous)	3	3:00
2023-06-24	Win	(France) Franck Gross	The Night of Kick and Punch – Black Tie Edition	Venaria Reale, Italy	TKO (retirement)	3	3:00
Defends the WAKO Pro K-1 World bantamweight (-56.4kg) title.
2023-05-20	Win	(Spain) Dostin Ortiz	The Art of Fighting 3	Monza, Italy	TKO (Low kicks)	3	
2023-02-04	Win	(Colombia) Daniel Bozso	The Night of Kick and Punch 13	Milan, Italy	Decision (Unanimous)	3	3:00
2022-11-19	Win	(Spain) Hamada Azmani	The Art of Fighting 2	Meda, Italy	Decision	3	3:00
2022-06-18	Win	(Moldova) Maxim Cazacu	The Night of Kick and Punch 12	Milan, Italy	TKO (arm injury/middle kick)	4	
Wins the vacant WAKO Pro K-1 World bantamweight (-56.4kg) title.
2022-03-19	Win	(Romania) Silviu Vitez	The Art of Fighting	Meda, Italy	Decision	3	3:00
2021-06-12	Win	(Italy) Giacomo D'aquino	Fighting Spirit Night 2021	Rome, Italy	Decision	3	3:00
2019-10-12	Win	(Italy) Alex Avogadro	Bellator Kickboxing 12	Milan, Italy	TKO (Doctor stoppage)	1	2:09
2019-09-07	Loss	(Russia) Astemir Borsov	2019 International Kickboxing Championship in Sakhalin	Yuzhno-Sakhalinsk, Russia	Decision (Unanimous)	5	3:00
Loses WAKO Pro K-1 World featherweight (-58.2kg) title.
2019-05-11	Win	(Netherlands) Pietro Doorje	La Notte Dei Campioni	Milan, Italy	Decision	3	3:00
2019-02-23	Win	(Poland) Pawel Szymanski	Ring War	Milan, Italy	Decision	3	3:00
2018-12-15	Win	(France) Nicolas Rivas	The Night of Kick and Punch 9	Milan, Italy	Decision (Unanimous)	3	3:00
2018-01-20	Win	(Italy) Emmanuele Tetti Menichelli	The Night of Kick and Punch 8	Milan, Italy	Decision	3	3:00
2017-12-16	Win	(Spain) Tito Macias		Ponferrada, Spain	Decision	5	3:00
Defends WAKO Pro K-1 World featherweight (-58.2kg) title.
2017-10-21	Win	(Poland) Krzysztof Olszewski	D-FIGHT	Madone, Italy	Decision (Unanimous)	5	3:00
Defends WAKO Pro K-1 World featherweight (-58.2kg) title.
2017-06-24	Win	(Spain) Tito Macias	The Night Of Kick And Punch 7	Milan, Italy	Decision	3	3:00
Wins the vacant WAKO Pro K-1 World featherweight (-58.2kg) title.
2017-02-18	Win	(Italy) Mohamed Rajifi	Ring War	Monza, Italy	Decision	3	3:00
2017-01-14	Win	(Italy) Filippo Piantanida	The Night Of Kick And Punch 6	Milan, Italy	Decision	3	3:00
2016-03-05	Loss	(Italy) Alex Avogadro	BURNOUT FIGHTING NIGHT	Cermenate, Italy	Decision	3	3:00
2015-12-17	Win	(Italy) Osvaldo Gagliardi	The Night Of Kick And Punch 5	Milan, Italy	Decision	3	3:00
2015-05-22	Loss	(Estonia) Markko Moisar	KOK Grand Prix	Riga, Latvia	Decision (Unanimous)	3	3:00
2015-10-10	Win	(Italy) Filippo Piantanida	The Night Of Kick And Punch 4	Milan, Italy	Decision	3	3:00
2015-04-25	Win	(Italy) Roberto Pizzagalli	Ring Mania 3	Lodi, Italy	Decision	5	2:00
Wins WAKO Pro Full Contact Italy title.
Legend: Win Loss Draw/No contest Notes

== See also ==
- List of male kickboxers
