= Rika Mamiya =

Japanese fashion model and singer (born 1992)

- 間宮 梨花
- Born: March 7, 1992 (age 34); Kanagawa Prefecture, Japan
- Occupations: Singer; fashion model
- Years active: 2008 - present
- Website: www.qualiam.com/talent/mamiya.html

Rika Mamiya (間宮 梨花, Mamiya Rika; born March 7, 1992) is a Japanese fashion model and singer.

== Early life ==
She was born in Kanagawa Prefecture to a Filipino mother and a Japanese father.

== Career ==
=== Modelling ===
She started her career in 2008 when she appeared in the fashion magazine Ranzuki until October 2010. She also participated in fashion events such as Shibuya Woman Festival and Shibuya Gal Festival.

=== Music ===
As a singer, she debuted in July 2009 when she joined the group Romeo, composed of Ayumi Sato, Tanaka and Hikichi Takazumi. She has also been a member of the all-female group Iloilo since November 2010.
