= Cawaii! =

Asian fashion magazine

Cover of the July 2009 Taiwanese edition, featuring Namie Amuro

Cawaii! is a fashion magazine published in Taiwan, the People's Republic of China, Thailand, and previously in Japan.

== History and profile ==
Launched as a monthly gal fashion magazine targeted at women in their teens in Japan in March 1996, Cawaii! grew to be one of Japan's major gal magazines, and spawned its two sister magazines, S Cawaii! and Hanachu. Circulation peaked at 400,000 in 2000.

The Chinese edition and the Taiwanese edition were founded before the early 2000s, and the Thai edition was founded in May 2004. The original Japanese edition suspended publication in May 2009 due to declining circulation.
