= Hirotaka Urabe =

Japanese kickboxer (born 1989)

- Born: 卜部弘嵩; May 13, 1989 (age 37); Tokyo, Japan
- Other names: Soul Destroyer
- Nationality: Japanese
- Height: 169 cm (5 ft 7 in)
- Weight: 60.0 kg (132.3 lb; 9.45 st)
- Style: Ashihara Karate, Kickboxing
- Stance: Orthodox
- Fighting out of: Tokyo, Japan
- Team: K-1 Gym KREST; Team Dragon (2010-2016)
- Trainer: Kensaku Maeda
- Rank: Black belt in Ashihara Karate
- Years active: 2007 - 2022

Kickboxing record
- Total: 58
- Wins: 36
- By knockout: 18
- Losses: 19
- By knockout: 2
- Draws: 3

Other information
- Spouse: Yu Takahashi (m. 2018)
- Notable relatives: Koya Urabe (brother); Maryjun Takahashi (sister-in-law); Yuji Takahashi (brother-in-law); Jui Takajo (sister-in-law); Aki Takajo (sister-in-law)

Hirotaka Urabe (Japanese: 卜部弘嵩, Urabe Hirotaka; born May 13, 1989) is a retired Japanese kickboxer, who competed professionally with AJKF, Krush and K-1. He is the former K-1 Super Featherweight champion, as well as the inaugural and two-time Krush Super Featherweight champion.

Combat Press ranked him as a top ten super flyweight (-58 kg) kickboxer in the world between September 2020 and July 2021.

== Kickboxing career ==
=== Krush super featherweight champion ===
==== First title reign ====
Urabe was booked to face Naoki Ishikawa on December 12, 2010, in the quarterfinals of the Krush Super Featherweight tournament, held to crown the inaugural Krush Super Featherweight champion. He won the fight by majority decision. Urabe faced Yuta Takahashi on April 30, 2011, in the tournament semifinals. He won the fight by majority decision, with scores of 30–29, 30–30 and 29–28. Urabe faced Yuji Takeuchi in the finals, which were held on the same day as the semifinals. He captured the inaugural championship with a first-round stoppage of Takeuchi.

Urabe faced Chen Mingming at Krush -70 kg Inaugural Tournament on July 16, 2011. He won the fight by a third-round technical knockout. The fight was stopped on the advice of the ringside physician, due to a broken nose. Urabe next faced Zheng Bo at Krush.12 on September 24, 2011. He won the fight by majority decision.

Urabe made his first Krush title defense against Naoki Ishikawa at Krush.15 on January 9, 2012. The fight was ruled a unanimous decision draw, with two scorecards of 28–28 and one scorecard of 29–29.

Urabe faced Masato Kobayashi at Krush.18 on May 3, 2012. He knocked Kobayashi out with a head kick after just 83 seconds. After overcoming Yuki Matsuno by unanimous decision on June 3, 2012, Urabe was booked to make his third title defense against Fumiya Osawa at Krush.20 on July 21, 2012. He retained the title by a first-round knockout.

Urabe faced Takaaki Murasaki at BigBang 10 on September 2, 2012. He floored Murasaki with a head kick at the 2:17 minute mark of the opening round. Urabe next faced Xavier Bastard at Krush.23 on October 8, 2012. He won the fight by technical knockout, due to doctor stoppage, in the extra fourth round.

Urabe made his second Krush title defense against Naoki Ishikawa at Krush.25 ～TEAM DRAGON 10th Anniversary～ on December 14, 2012. The pair fought to a unanimous decision draw in Urabe's first defense on January 9, 2012. The fight was once again ruled a draw, with one judge scoring the bout 28–27 for Ishikawa and two of the judges scoring it an even 28–28. Urabe was knocked down in the first round, but was able to knock Ishikawa down in the second round.

Urabe faced Shigeru at Road to GLORY JAPAN -65 kg SLAM on March 10, 2013. The fight was ruled a majority decision draw after the first three rounds, with one judge scoring the bout for Urabe. He won the fight by doctor's stoppage in the fourth round, due to a cut above Shigeru's left eye. Urabe next faced Antonio Campagna at Krush.28 on May 12, 2013. He won the fight by a third-round technical knockout.

Urabe made his third title defense against the former RISE Super Featherweight champion Kan Itabashi at Krush.30 on August 11, 2013. The fight was ruled a draw after the first three rounds, with two judges scoring the bout an even 29–29 and one judge scoring the bout 30–29 for Itabashi. Urabe was knocked down with a left hook in the extra fourth round however, which led to all three judges awarding Itabashi a 10–8 scorecard.

==== Pre-championship bouts ====
Urabe faced the one-time Krush Lightweight champion Ryuji Kajiwara at Krush.35 on December 14, 2013. He lost the fight by unanimous decision, with scores of 29–28, 30–28 and 29–28.

Urabe faced Park Hyun Sung in a -60.5 kg catchweight bout at Krush.38 on February 14, 2014. He won the fight by unanimous decision, with all three judges scoring every round of the contest for him.

Urabe faced Xavier Bastard for the ISKA Oriental Rules Super Lightweight title at Best of Fight on May 1, 2014. He captured the title by decision. Urabe next faced Masahiro Yamamoto at Krush.44 on August 9, 2014. He won the fight by unanimous decision, with all three judges scoring the bout 30–29 in his favor.

==== Second title reign ====
Urabe faced Kotaro Shimano for the vacant Krush Super Featherweight title at Krush.47 on November 9, 2014. He won the fight by unanimous decision, with scores of 28–27, 27–26 and 28–26. Urabe knocked his opponent down in the first round, was himself knocked down early in the third round and was able to once again knock Shimano down later on in the final round.

Urabe took part in the 2016 K-1 Super Featherweight Grand Prix, held to crown the inaugural champion. He was booked to face Karim Bennoui in the quarterfinals of the one-day tournament. He won the fight by technical knockout, as the fight was stopped in the first round on the advice of the ringside physician. Urabe faced Javier Hernández in the semifinals and won the fight by unanimous decision, after an extra fourth round was contested. Urabe faced his brother Koya in the Grand Prix final. He lost the fight by unanimous decision.

Urabe made his the first defense of his second Krush title defense against German Tabuencav at Krush.54 on May 4, 2015. He won the fight by a third-round knockout. Urabe made his second title defense against Zhuang Shuson at Krush.58 on September 12, 2015. He once again won the fight by a third-round knockout.

=== K-1 ===
==== Super featherweight champion ====
Urabe challenged the K-1 Super Featherweight champion Koya Urabe at K-1 World GP 2015 The Championship on November 21, 2015. He won the fight by a third-round knockout.

Urabe faced Paulo Tebar in the quarterfinals of the 2016 K-1 Japan Super Featherweight Grand Prix on April 24, 2016. He lost the fight by an upset majority decision. Urabe vacated his Krush title on June 1, 2016, to focus on his K-1 title.

Urabe faced Johannes Wolf in the quarterfinals of the 2016 K-1 World Super Featherweight Grand Prix, which took place on September 19, 2016. Although he was able to beat Wolf by unanimous decision, he lost the semifinal bout against the eventual tournament winner Taiga Kawabe by unanimous decision, which cost him his K-1 championship.

He challenged Taiga Kawabe for the K-1 Super Featherweight Championship in an immediate rematch at K-1 World GP 2017 Lightweight Championship Tournament on February 25, 2017. He lost the fight by unanimous decision.

==== Later career ====
Urabe faced Zheng Junfeng at Krush.77 on July 16, 2017. He lost the fight by majority decision. Urabe rebounded from this loss with a second-round knockout of Masahiro Yamamoto at K-1 World GP 2017 Welterweight Championship Tournament on September 18, 2017. He failed to build on this success however, as he suffered a unanimous decision loss to Kouzi at K-1 WORLD GP 2018 JAPAN ～K'FESTA.1～ -60kg World Tournament on March 21, 2018.

Urabe faced Xue Shenzheng at Krush.90 on July 22, 2018. He won the fight by unanimous decision, with two scorecards of 30–29 and one scorecard of 30–28. Urabe next faced Ryusei Ashizawa at K-1 World GP 2018: 3rd Super Lightweight Championship Tournament on November 3, 2018. He knocked Ashizawa out with a right hook at the 2:28 minute mark of the third round.

His victories over Shenzheng and Ashizawa earned Urabe the chance to challenge the K-1 Featherweight champion Yuta Murakoshi at K-1 World GP 2019: K’FESTA 2 on March 10, 2019. He lost the fight by unanimous decision.,

Urabe faced Brandon Spain in the quarterfinals of the 2019 K-1 Featherweight World Grand Prix, which was held at K-1 World GP 2019 Yokohamatsuri on November 24, 2019. Although he was able to beat Spain by unanimous decision, he in turn suffered a unanimous decision loss at the hands of Jawsuayai Sor.Dechaphan in the Grand Prix semifinals.

Urabe faced Kizaemon Saiga at K-1 World GP 2020 Winter's Crucial Bout on December 13, 2020. He weighed-in at 60.4 kg at the official weigh-ins, 1.9 kg over the featherweight limit. Urabe lost the fight by disqualification, as Saiga was unable to continue due to a low blow.

Urabe faced Ryusei Ashizawa at K-1 World GP 2021: Yokohamatsuri on September 20, 2021. He lost the fight by unanimous decision, with scores of 30–28, 30–28 and 30–27.

Urabe was booked to face Kotaro Shimano in a 61 kg catchweight bout at K-1 World GP 2022 Japan on February 27, 2022. He lost the fight by a third-round knockout.

Urabe announced his retirement on July 27, 2022, at the age of 33.

== Titles and accomplishments ==
=== Professional ===
- K-1
  - 2015 K-1 Super Featherweight Championship
- Krush
  - 2011 Krush Super Featherweight Championship
    - Three successful title defenses
  - 2014 Krush Super Featherweight Championship
    - Two successful title defenses
- International Sport Kickboxing Association
  - 2014 ISKA Oriental Rules World Super Lightweight Championship

=== Amateur ===
- 2006 Shin Karate All Japan Light Middleweight K-2 Grand Prix Runner-up and Skill Award
- 2007 Shin Karate All Japan Light Middleweight K-2 Grand Prix Winner

== Kickboxing record ==
Kickboxing record
36 Wins (18 (T)KO's), 19 Losses, 3 Draws, 0 No Contest
Date	Result	Opponent	Event	Location	Method	Round	Time
2022-02-27	Loss	(Japan) Kotaro Shimano	K-1 World GP 2022 Japan	Tokyo, Japan	KO (Right cross)	3	2:51
2021-09-20	Loss	(Japan) Ryusei Ashizawa	K-1 World GP 2021: Yokohamatsuri	Yokohama, Japan	Decision (Unanimous)	3	3:00
2020-12-13	Loss	(Japan) Kizaemon Saiga	K-1 World GP 2020 Winter's Crucial Bout	Tokyo, Japan	Disqualification (Low blow)	2	
2019-11-24	Loss	(Thailand) Jawsuayai Sor.Dechaphan	K-1 World GP 2019 Yokohamatsuri - 57.5 kg Championship Tournament, Semifinals	Yokohama, Japan	Ext.R Decision (Unanimous)	4	3:00
2019-11-24	Win	(Australia) Brandon Spain	K-1 World GP 2019 Yokohamatsuri - 57.5 kg Championship Tournament, Quarterfinals	Yokohama, Japan	Decision (Unanimous)	3	3:00
2019-03-10	Loss	(Japan) Yuta Murakoshi	K-1 World GP 2019: K’FESTA 2	Saitama, Japan	Decision (Unanimous)	3	3:00
For the K-1 Featherweight Championship.
2018-11-03	Win	(Japan) Ryusei Ashizawa	K-1 World GP 2018: 3rd Super Lightweight Championship Tournament	Saitama, Japan	KO (Right Hook)	3	2:28
2018-07-22	Win	(China) Xue Shenzheng	Krush.90	Tokyo, Japan	Decision (Unanimous)	3	3:00
2018-03-21	Loss	(Japan) Koji	K-1 WORLD GP 2018 JAPAN ～K'FESTA.1～ -60kg World Tournament	Saitama, Japan	Ext.R Decision (Unanimous)	4	3:00
2017-09-18	Win	(Japan) Masahiro Yamamoto	K-1 World GP 2017 Welterweight Championship Tournament	Saitama, Japan	KO (Right Cross)	2	2:51
2017-07-16	Loss	(China) Zheng Junfeng	Krush.77	Tokyo, Japan	Decision (Majority)	3	3:00
2017-02-25	Loss	(Japan) Taiga Kawabe	K-1 World GP 2017 Lightweight Championship Tournament	Tokyo, Japan	Decision (Unanimous)	3	3:00
For the K-1 Super Featherweight Championship.
2016-09-19	Loss	(Japan) Taiga Kawabe	K-1 World GP 2016 Super Featherweight World Tournament, Semi Finals	Tokyo, Japan	Decision (Unanimous)	3	3:00
2016-09-19	Win	(Germany) Johannes Wolf	K-1 World GP 2016 Super Featherweight World Tournament, Quarter Finals	Tokyo, Japan	Decision (Unanimous)	3	3:00
2016-04-24	Loss	(Brazil) Paulo Tebar	K-1 World GP 2016 -60kg Japan Tournament, Quarter Finals	Tokyo, Japan	Decision (Majority)	3	3:00
2016-03-04	Loss	(Germany) Johannes Wolf	K-1 World GP 2016 -65kg Japan Tournament	Tokyo, Japan	Decision (Majority)	3	3:00
2015-11-21	Win	(Japan) Koya Urabe	K-1 World GP 2015 The Championship	Tokyo, Japan	KO (Jumping Knee)	3	2:14
Wins the K-1 Super Featherweight Championship.
2015-09-12	Win	(China) Zhuang Shuson	Krush.58	Tokyo, Japan	TKO (Referee Stoppage)	3	0:44
Defends the Krush Super Featherweight Championship.
2015-07-04	Win	(Japan) Toshi	K-1 World GP 2015 -70kg Championship Tournament	Tokyo, Japan	Ext.R Decision (Unanimous)	4	3:00
2015-05-04	Win	(Spain) German Tabuenca	Krush.54	Tokyo, Japan	KO (Jumping Knee)	3	1:44
Defends the Krush Super Featherweight Championship.
2015-01-18	Loss	(Japan) Koya Urabe	K-1 World GP 2015 -60kg Championship Tournament, Final	Tokyo, Japan	Decision (Unanimous)	3	3:00
For the inaugural K-1 Super Featherweight Championship.
2015-01-18	Win	(Spain) Javier Hernández	K-1 World GP 2015 -60kg Championship Tournament, Semi Finals	Tokyo, Japan	Ext.R Decision (Unanimous)	4	3:00
2015-01-18	Win	(France) Karim Bennoui	K-1 World GP 2015 -60kg Championship Tournament, Quarter Finals	Tokyo, Japan	TKO (Doctor Stoppage)	1	2:03
2014-11-09	Win	(Japan) Kotaro Shimano	Krush.47	Tokyo, Japan	Decision (Unanimous)	3	3:00
Wins the vacant Krush Super Featherweight Championship.
2014-08-09	Win	(Japan) Masahiro Yamamoto	Krush.44	Tokyo, Japan	Decision (Unanimous)	3	3:00
2014-05-01	Draw	(France) Xavier Bastard	Best of Fight	Gueret, France	Decision	5	3:00
Wins the ISKA Oriental Rules Super Lightweight title.
2014-02-14	Win	(Korea) Park Hyun Sung	Krush.38	Tokyo, Japan	Decision (Unanimous)	3	3:00
2013-12-14	Loss	(Japan) Ryuji Kajiwara	Krush.35	Tokyo, Japan	Decision (Unanimous)	3	3:00
2013-08-11	Loss	(Japan) Kan Itabashi	Krush.30	Tokyo, Japan	Ext.R Decision (Unanimous)	4	3:00
Loses the Krush Super Featherweight Championship.
2013-05-12	Win	(Italy) Antonio Campagna	Krush.28	Tokyo, Japan	TKO (Punches)	3	2:24
2013-03-10	Win	(Japan) Shigeru	Road to GLORY JAPAN -65 kg SLAM	Tokyo, Japan	TKO (Doctor Stoppage)	4	0:28
2012-12-14	Draw	(Japan) Naoki Ishikawa	Krush.25 ～TEAM DRAGON 10th Anniversary～	Tokyo, Japan	Decision (Majority)	3	3:00
Defends the Krush Super Featherweight Championship.
2012-10-08	Win	(France) Xavier Bastard	Krush.23	Tokyo, Japan	Ext.R TKO (Doctor Stoppage)	4	2:08
2012-09-02	Win	(Japan) Takaaki Murasaki	BigBang 10	Tokyo, Japan	KO (Right High Kick)	1	2:17
2012-07-21	Win	(Japan) Fumiya Osawa	Krush.20	Tokyo, Japan	KO (Spinning back kick)	1	2:48
Defends the Krush Super Featherweight Championship.
2012-06-03	Win	(Japan) Yuki Matsuno	BigBang 9	Tokyo, Japan	Decision (Unanimous)	3	3:00
2012-05-03	Win	(Japan) Masato Kobayashi	Krush.18	Tokyo, Japan	KO (Right High Kick)	1	1:23
2012-01-09	Draw	(Japan) Naoki Ishikawa	Krush.15	Tokyo, Japan	Decision (Unanimous)	3	3:00
Defends the Krush Super Featherweight Championship.
2011-11-12	Win	(Netherlands) Maik Redan	Krush.13	Tokyo, Japan	Decision (Unanimous)	3	3:00
2011-09-24	Win	(China) Zheng Bo	Krush.12	Tokyo, Japan	Decision (Majority)	3	3:00
2011-07-16	Win	(China) Chen Mingming	Krush -70 kg Inaugural Tournament	Tokyo, Japan	TKO (Doctor Stoppage)	3	0:57
2011-04-30	Win	(Japan) Yuji Takeuchi	Krush -60 kg Inaugural Championship Tournament -Triple Final Round-	Tokyo, Japan	KO (Left High Kick)	1	1:28
Wins the inaugural Krush Super Featherweight Championship.
2011-04-30	Win	(Japan) Yuta Takahashi	Krush -60 kg Inaugural Championship Tournament -Triple Final Round-	Tokyo, Japan	Decision (Majority)	3	3:00
2010-12-12	Win	(Japan) Naoki Ishikawa	Krush -60 kg Inaugural Championship Tournament -First Round-	Tokyo, Japan	Decision (Majority)	3	3:00
2010-09-20	Loss	(Japan) Masaaki Noiri	Krush.10	Tokyo, Japan	Decision (Unanimous)	3	3:00
2010-06-12	Win	(Japan) Hiroki Namai	Krush-EX 2010 vol.2	Tokyo, Japan	Decision (Unanimous)	3	3:00
2010-05-02	Loss	(Japan) Toshiki Taniyama	K-1 WORLD MAX 2010 〜-63 kg Japan Tournament 1st Round〜	Tokyo, Japan	Ext.R Decision (Split)	4	3:00
2010-02-19	Win	(Japan) Yasuaki Koyama	Krush-EX 〜New Generation Fight〜	Tokyo, Japan	KO (Right cross)	2	2:41
2009-12-04	Win	(Japan) Masahiko Ito	Krush-EX 〜Shinjuku Dog Fight〜	Tokyo, Japan	KO (High knee)	1	1:13
2009-09-22	Win	(Japan) Hayato Uesugi	Krush.4	Tokyo, Japan	Decision (Unanimous)	3	3:00
2009-08-10	Win	(Japan) Yusuke Tsuboi	K-1 Koshien Final 16	Tokyo, Japan	Decision (Unanimous)	3	3:00
2009-04-18	Draw	(Japan) Hisaaki Nakamuklai	All Japan Kickboxing Federation CROSSOVER－2	Tokyo, Japan	Decision	3	3:00
2008-11-08	Loss	(Japan) Yosuke Mizuochi	All Japan Kickboxing Federation Krush! 〜Kickboxing Destruction〜	Tokyo, Japan	Decision (Majority)	3	3:00
2008-08-29	Win	(Japan) Masayuki Ishibashi	K-1 Koshien King of under 18 - Final 16 -	Tokyo, Japan	KO (Low Kick)	3	2:33
2008-07-07	Loss	(Belarus) Denis Telitsa	K-1 WORLD MAX 2008 World Championship Tournament FINAL8	Tokyo, Japan	KO (Right Cross)	2	1:16
2008-02-09	Loss	(Japan) Shinji Suzuki	All Japan Kickboxing Federation CUB☆KICK'S-9	Tokyo, Japan	Ext.R Decision (Unanimous)	4	3:00
2007-10-25	Win	(Japan) Kazuhito Soma	All Japan Kickboxing Federation Kickboxer of the best 60 Tournament	Tokyo, Japan	Decision (Unanimous)	3	3:00
2007-09-29	Win	(Japan) Yuuki	All Japan Kickboxing Federation Road to 70's	Tokyo, Japan	Decision (Unanimous)	3	3:00
2007-07-29	Win	(Japan) Yosuke Nishiyama	All Japan Kickboxing Federation Super Fight 2007	Tokyo, Japan	KO	1	0:58
Legend: Win Loss Draw/No contest Notes

== Personal life ==
In October 2018, Urabe married actress Yu Takahashi. The couple has two sons. They welcomed the birth of their first child on September 22, 2019, their second child was born on June 28, 2022, respectively.

== See also ==
- List of male kickboxers
- List of K-1 champions
