= Yu Takahashi (actress) =

Japanese actress and model (born 1991)

- Born: January 19, 1991 (age 35); Otsu, Shiga Prefecture, Japan
- Occupations: Actress; model
- Years active: 2006–present
- Spouse: Hirotaka Urabe (m. 2018)
- Children: 2
- Relatives: Maryjun Takahashi (sister); Yuji Takahashi (brother); Jui Takajo (sister-in-law); Aki Takajo (sister-in-law); Koya Urabe (brother-in-law)
- Modeling information
- Height: 1.765 m (5 ft 9 in)
- Hair color: Black
- Eye color: Brown
- Agency: Asia Promotion

Japanese name
- Kanji: 高橋 ユウ
- Hiragana: たかはし ユウ
Transcriptions
- Romanization: Takahashi Yu
- Website: Official modeling profile

Yu Takahashi (高橋 ユウ, Takahashi Yū; born January 19, 1991), is a Japanese actress and model.

== Early life ==
Takahashi was born in Ōtsu, Shiga Prefecture, on January 19, 1991, to a Filipina mother and a Japanese father. She is the younger sister of Maryjun Takahashi, who is also a model and actress. And her younger brother is a professional football player, Yuji Takahashi. She won the Grand Prix in a female vocal audition in 2006 held by the TV Tokyo show Output.

== Career ==
=== Modelling career ===
Takahashi is represented by the Asia Promotion talent agency. She started her career as an exclusive model for the Cawaii! magazine and her first photo book, Yu, was released in 2008. After that, she was an exclusive model for the Pinky magazine until 2009.

=== Acting career ===
She appeared regularly in the NHK Educational TV television program Kyō Kara Eikaiwa in 2007. As an actress, she played Yuri Aso in TV Asahi's Kamen Rider Kiva and starred in the 2008 film version, Kamen Rider Kiva: King of the Castle in the Demon World. She played a leading role in the 2012 film, Brand Guardians, with South Korean actor Yoon Shi-yoon. In 2013, she played the role of Makoto/Sailor Jupiter in a musical remake of Sailor Moon: La Reconquista and in 2014 in musical Sailor Moon: Petite Étrangère.

== Personal life ==
In October 2018, Takahashi married K-1 fighter Hirotaka Urabe. On January 28, 2020, she announced that had given birth to her first child, a son.

On June 28, 2022, she announced that she was pregnant with her second child, and had given birth to her second son on December 2 of the same year.

== Appearances ==
=== Films ===
- Kamen Rider Kiva: King of the Castle in the Demon World (2008), Yuri Asō
- Brand Guardians (2012)
- Stolen Identity 2 (2020)

=== TV dramas ===
- Kamen Rider Kiva (TV Asahi, 2008–2009), Yuri Asō
- Shinigami-kun Episode 6 (TV Asahi, 2014), Sayaka Kirino
- Kono Mystery ga Sugoi!: Best Seller Sakka Kara no Chōsenjō (TBS, 2014), Mutsumi Sakashita
- Kageriyuku Natsu (WOWOW, 2015), Sachiko Haruki
- Mondai no Aru Restaurant Episode 2 (Fuji TV, 2015)
- Kamen Rider Zi-O (TV Asahi, 2019), Sougo Tokiwa's true first love, "Ms. Sailor"

=== Stage ===
- Pu-Pu-Juice Pani☆Hosu (August 2013)
- Sailor Moon musicals (AiiA Theater Tokyo, 13 September 2013 - 2015), Sailor Jupiter
- Sonezaki Shinjū (September 2013)
- WBB Vol.6 Soshite, Konya mo Nikolaschka! (June 2014)

=== Events ===
- Kansai Collection (2014 S/S, 2014 A/W, 2015 S/S)
- Tokyo Girls Collection (2011 A/W, 2012 A/W)
- Girls Award (2010 S/S, 2010 A/W, 2011 A/W, 2012 A/W)

== Bibliography ==
=== Magazines ===
- Pinky, Shueisha 2004–2009, as an exclusive model until 2009
- Cawaii!, Shufunotomo 1996–2009, as an exclusive model from 2006 to 2009

=== Photobook ===
- Yu (Saibunkan Publishing, September 2008) ISBN 9784775602980

== Awards ==
- The 68th Agency for Cultural Affairs Japan Arts Festival (2013): Best Newcomer
- The 3rd Best Engagement 2015: Won (Family Category)

Preceded by Mai Watanabe	Makoto Kino/Sailor Jupiter in the Sailor Moon musicals 2013-2015	Succeeded by N/A
