= Maryjun Takahashi =

Japanese model and actress

- 高橋 メアリージュン
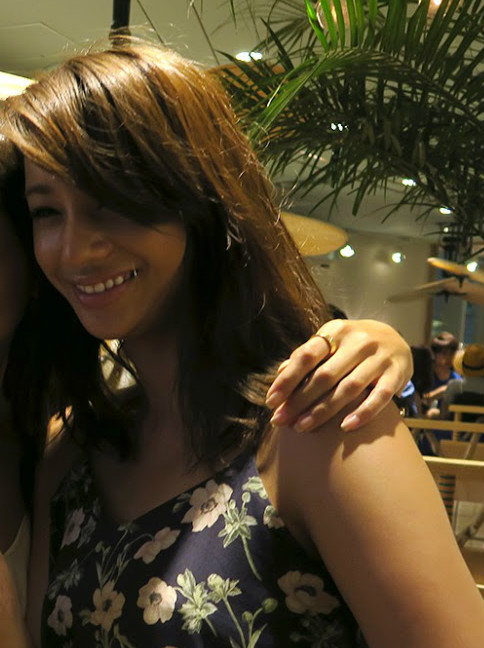
- Takahashi in July 2015
- Born: November 8, 1987 (age 38); Ōtsu, Shiga, Japan
- Occupations: Model; actress
- Years active: 2004–present
- Relatives: Yu Takahashi (sister); Yuji Takahashi (brother); Jui Takajo (sister-in-law); Aki Takajo (sister-in-law); Hirotaka Urabe (brother-in-law); Koya Urabe (brother-in-law)
- Modeling information
- Height: 1.69 m (5 ft 7 in)
- Hair color: Black
- Eye color: Brown
- Agency: Asia Promotion
- Website: ameblo.jp/maryjun/

Maryjun Takahashi (高橋 メアリージュン, Takahashi Mearījun; born November 8, 1987), is a Japanese actress and model. She has appeared in CanCam magazine and various television commercials.

== Biography ==
Takahashi was born in Ōtsu, Shiga to a Filipino mother and a Japanese father. She has a younger sister, Yu Takahashi, who is also a model and actress, and a brother, Yuji, who is a footballer.

== Career ==
She began modeling in August 2003 after winning the "Yokohama Shonan Audition 2003" beauty contest, and professionally in April 2004 when she signed a contract with CanCam. Since 2007, she has appeared in various television shows such as music shows and variety shows, and various television commercials such as those for fashion brand Cecil McBee, Kyocera, Morinaga, and Google.

She has also been active in the runway scene, appearing in large collections such as Tokyo Girls Collection (2007 S/S, 2009 A/W, 2010 S/S, 2010 in Okinawa, 2010 A/W, 2011 in Nagoya, 2011 S/S, 2011 A/W, 2012 S/S) and Girls Award (2010, 2010 A/W, 2011 A/W, 2012 S/S, 2012 A/W).

Her exclusive modeling contract for CanCam ended in April 2012, and subsequently appeared in magazines such as Classy, Oggi, and Gina.

She has also appeared in the TV drama Jun to Ai with Mokomichi Hayami.

Takahashi portrayed Yumi Komagata in the film Rurouni Kenshin: Kyoto Inferno, released in 2014.

== Filmography ==
=== TV dramas ===
- Jun and Ai (2012), Mariya Karino(Maruyama)
- Rich Man, Poor Woman (2013)
- Keishichō Sōsa Ikka 9 Gakari Season 8 Episode 2 (2013), Tomoyo Shinomiya
- Real Dasshutsu Game TV (2014), Ageha
- Cabin Attendant Keiji: New York Satsujin Jiken (2014), Kei Shinoda
- Kōkaku Fudō Senki Robosan Episode 6 (2014), Risa
- Zannen na Otto. (2015), Yui Sudō
- Jungle Fever (2016), Rieko Kikuchi
- Hibana (2016), Yurie
- Good Morning Call (2017), Kumanomido Saeko
- Jinsei-ga tanoshiku naru shiawase no housoku (2019)
- My Housekeeper Nagisa-san (2020), Kaoru Suyama
- Omameda Towako and Her Three Ex-Husbands (2021), Karen Matsubayashi
- Captured New Airport (2024), Dragon, the leader of the Beast armed group
- Golden Kamuy: The Hunt of Prisoners in Hokkaido (2024), Inkarmat

=== Films ===
- Fashion Story: Model (2012)
- Ushijima the Loan Shark 2 (2014), Akane Saihara
- Rurouni Kenshin: Kyoto Inferno (2014), Yumi Komagata
- Rurouni Kenshin: The Legend Ends (2014), Yumi Komagata
- Kikaider Reboot (2014), Mari
- Heroine Shikkaku (2015), Emi
- Tag (a.k.a. Real Onigokko) (2015)
- All Esper Dayo! (2015)
- Fukushū Shitai (2016), Izumi Takahashi/Noriko Hoshino
- Shimauma (2016), Yui
- Haunted Campus (2016), Ai Mitamura
- Ushijima the Loan Shark 3 (2016), Akane Saihara
- Ushijima the Loan Shark The Final (2016), Akane Saihara
- L (2016), Anna
- Shinjuku Swan II (2017)
- The Blue Hearts (2017)
- Under One Umbrella (2018)
- What Happened to Our Nest Egg!? (2021)
- Fly Me to the Saitama: From Biwa Lake with Love (2023)
- Golden Kamuy: The Abashiri Prison Raid (2026), Inkarmat

=== Stage ===
- Pu-Pu-Juice Kiseki no Otoko (2013)
- Pu-Pu-Juice Ryōma ga Ikiru, Ryōma o Korosu (2014)

== Bibliography ==
=== Magazines ===
- CanCam, Shogakukan 1982-, as an exclusive model from April 2004 to June 2012
- Classy, Kobunsha 1984-, as a regular model since June 2012
