= Johannes Wolf (kickboxer) =

German kickboxer

- Born: November 24, 1988 (age 37); Ingolstadt, Germany
- Other names: Der Wolf
- Height: 166 cm (5 ft 5 in)
- Weight: 59.0 kg (130.1 lb; 9.29 st)
- Style: Full contact, kickboxing
- Stance: Southpaw
- Fighting out of: Ingolstadt, Germany
- Team: Kickboxtempel Ingolstadt

Kickboxing record
- Total: 45
- Wins: 41
- By knockout: 28
- Losses: 3
- By knockout: 0
- Draws: 1

Johannes Wolf is a retired German kickboxer. He is a former ISKA, WKA and WAKO Pro Full Contact world champion.

== Career ==
Wolf was booked to compete for a world title for the first time on December 5, 2009, against Alexander Shamray for the ISKA Full Contact Featherweight World title. He won the fight by unanimous decision. He made the first defense of his title on May 22, 2010, against Sunny Hira. He won the fight by unanimous decision.

Wolf had his first professional experience in a ruleset including low kicks on September 25, 2010, when he faced Yury Trogiyanov in Vienna, Austria for the vacant ISKA Low Kick Featherweight World title. He lost the fight by unanimous decision.

On November 13, 2010, Wolf challenged Daniel Martins for his WAKO-Pro Full Contact Featherweight world title. The fight ended in a draw after twelve rounds. They rematched On March 19, 2011, in Vohburg, Germany. Wolf won by split decision and took the world title.

Wolf made the second defense of his ISKA Featherweight World title on November 12, 2011, against Vedat Uruc. He won the fight by third-round knockout with a left kick to the body.

On January 14, 2012, Wolf travelled to Grozny, Russia to face Umar Paskhaev for the W5 low kick rules European title. He lost the fight by decision.

Wolf made the first defense of his WAKO-Pro Featherweight World title against Roberto Pizzagalli on March 31, 2012. He won the fight by unanimous decision.

Wolf made the third defense of his ISKA Featherweight World title against Marvin Falck on March 17, 2013. He won the fight by unanimous decision after twelve rounds.

Wolf faced Ilias El Hajoui on October 13, 2014, with his ISKA Super Featherweight World title and the vacant WKA Super featherweight World title at stake. He won the fight by decision.

Wolf was booked to defend his ISKA World Super Featherweight title against Arnaud Charrier on January 16, 2016, in Saint-Brieuc, France. He won the fight by unanimous decision.

On March 4, 2016, Wolf travelled to Japan to face the reigning K-1 Super Featherweight champion Hirotaka Urabe at K-1 World GP 2016 -65kg Japan Tournament. He won the fight by majority decision. This result earned him an upset of the year nomination by Combat Press and an invitation to the upcoming 60 kg K-1 World Grand Prix.

Wolf rematched Hirotaka Urabe in the quarterfinals of the 2016 K-1 World Super Featherweight Grand Prix, which took place on September 19, 2016. He lost the bout by unanimous decision.

== Titles and accomplishments ==
=== Professional ===
- International Sport Kickboxing Association
  - 2009 ISKA Full Contact European Featherweight Champion
    - One successful title defense
  - 2009 ISKA Full Contact World Featherweight Champion (−57 kg)
    - Three successful title defenses
  - 2014 ISKA Full Contact World Super Featherweight (−59 kg) Champion
    - One successful title defense
- World Association of Kickboxing Organizations
  - 2012 WAKO-Pro Full Contact World Featherweight (−58.2 kg) Champion
    - One successful title defense
- World Kickboxing Association
  - 2014 WKA Full Contact Super Featherweight (−59 kg) World Champion

=== Amateur ===
- World Association of Kickboxing Organizations
  - 2006 W.A.K.O. World Junior Championships Full Contact −57 kg (gold)
  - 2008 W.A.K.O. European Championships Full Contact −57 kg (bronze)
  - 2014 W.A.K.O. European Championships Full Contact −57 kg (gold)
  - 2015 W.A.K.O. World Championships Full Contact −57 kg (gold)
  - 2017 W.A.K.O. World Championships Full Contact −57 kg (gold)

== Kickboxing record ==
Professional Kickboxing record
41 Wins (28 (T)KO's), 3 Losses, 1 Draw, 0 No Contest
Date	Result	Opponent	Event	Location	Method	Round	Time
2016-09-19	Loss	(Japan) Hirotaka Urabe	K-1 World GP 2016 Super Featherweight World Tournament, Quarter Finals	Tokyo, Japan	Decision (Unanimous)	3	3:00
2016-03-04	Win	(Japan) Hirotaka Urabe	K-1 World GP 2016 -65kg Japan Tournament	Tokyo, Japan	Decision (Majority)	3	3:00
2016-01-16	Win	(France) Arnaud Charrier	Elite Fight 3	Saint-Brieuc, France	Decision (Unanimous)	5	3:00
Defends ISKA Full Contact World Super Featherweight (−59kg) title.
2014-10-03	Win	(Netherlands) Ilias El Hajoui	Plaza Fights	Ingolstadt, Germany	Decision (Unanimous)	12	2:00
Defends ISKA Full Contact World Super Featherweight (−59kg) title and wins the vacant WKA World Full Contact Super Featherweight (−59 kg) title.
2013-03-17	Win	(France) Marvin Falck	KickboxTempel Plaza Fight	Ingolstadt, Germany	Decision (Unanimous)	12	2:00
Defends ISKA Full Contact World Featherweight (−57kg) title.
2012-03-31	Win	(Italy) Roberto Pizzagalli	DinnerBoxen	Ingolstadt, Germany	Decision (Unanimous)	12	2:00
Defends the WAKO-Pro Full Contact World Featherweight (−58.2 kg) title.
2012-01-14	Loss	(Russia) Umar Paskhaev	W5	Grozny, Russia	Decision	5	3:00
For the W5 Low kick European −57kg title. Paskhaev missed weight by 2kg.
2011-11-19	Win	(Germany) Rewing Obaid	Keta's Fight Night	Munich, Germany	TKO	2	
2011-11-12	Win	(Turkey) Vedat Uruc	DinnerBoxen	Ingolstadt, Germany	KO (Body kick)	3	
Defends ISKA Full Contact World Featherweight (−58.2 kg) title.
2011-03-19	Win	(France) Daniel Martins		Vohburg, Germany	Decision (Split)	12	2:00
Wins the WAKO-Pro Full Contact World Featherweight (−58.2 kg) title.
2010-11-13	Draw	(France) Daniel Martins		Germany	Decision	12	2:00
For the WAKO-Pro Full Contact World Featherweight (−58.2 kg) title.
2010-09-25	Loss	(Russia) Yury Trogiyanov		Vienna, Austria	Decision (Unanimous)	12	2:00
For the ISKA Low Kick World Featherweight (−58.2 kg) title.
2010-05-22	Win	(United Kingdom) Sunny Hira		Ingolstadt, Germany	Decision (Unanimous)	12	2:00
Defends ISKA Full Contact World Featherweight (−58.2 kg) title.
2009-12-05	Win	(Russia) Alexander Shamray	Kick for Kids	Ingolstadt, Germany	Decision (Unanimous)	12	2:00
Wins the ISKA Full Contact World Featherweight (−58.2 kg) title.
2009-11-08	Win	(Turkey) Mesut Arslan	W5 World Kickboxing GP Germany	Germany	KO	4	
2009-09-28	Win	(Hungary) Tamasz Dukai		Geisenfeld, Germany	TKO	4	
2009-07-05	Win	(France) Nabil Majoubi		Geisenfeld, Germany	KO		
Defends the ISKA Full Contact European Featherweight (−58.2 kg) title.
2009-03-20	Win	(Spain) Juan Luis Sanchez Martinez	Kick for Kids	Geisenfeld, Germany	KO	4	
Wins the ISKA Full Contact European Featherweight (−58.2 kg) title.
2007-10-29	Win	(Italy) Francesco de Luca		Ingolstadt, Germany	Decision		
Legend: Win Loss Draw/No contest Notes

Amateur Kickboxing Record
Date	Result	Opponent	Event	Location	Method	Round	Time
2017-11-11	Win	(Kazakhstan) Arnal Kanapyanov	2017 WAKO World Championship, Final	Budapest, Hungary	Decision (3:0)	3	2:00
Wins 2017 WAKO World Championship Full Contact −57kg Gold Medal.
2017-11-10	Win	(Turkey) Uzeyir Kucadar	2017 WAKO World Championship, Semi-final	Budapest, Hungary	Decision (3:0)	3	2:00
2017-11-09	Win	(Russia) Leonid Chebodaev	2017 WAKO World Championship, Quarterfinal	Budapest, Hungary	KO (Spinning back kick)	1	
2015-11-28	Win	(Russia) Astemir Borsov	2015 WAKO World Championship, Final	Dublin, Ireland	Decision (2:1)	3	2:00
Wins 2015 WAKO World Championship Full Contact −57kg Gold Medal.
2015-11-27	Win	(Poland) Robert Niedzwiedzki	2015 WAKO World Championship, Semi-final	Dublin, Ireland	Decision (3:0)	3	2:00
2015-11-26	Win	(Italy) Daniele Panetta	2015 WAKO World Championship, Quarterfinal	Dublin, Ireland	Decision (3:0)	3	2:00
2014-10-25	Win	(Italy) Daniele Panetta	2014 WAKO European Championship, Final	Bilbao, Spain	Decision (3:0)	3	2:00
Wins 2014 WAKO European Championship Full Contact −57kg Gold Medal.
2014-10-24	Win	(Russia) Astemir Borsov	2014 WAKO European Championship, Semi-finals	Bilbao, Spain	Decision (3:0)	3	2:00
2014-10-23	Win	(Turkey) Fatih Sahin	2014 WAKO European Championship, Quarterfinals	Bilbao, Spain	Decision (3:0)	3	2:00
2008-10-24	Loss	(Poland) Damian Ławniczak	2008 WAKO European Championship, Semi-finals	Varna, Bulgaria	Decision (3:0)	3	2:00
Wins 2008 WAKO European Championship Full Contact −57kg Bronze Medal.
2006-09-	Win	(Kazakhstan) Nauryzbayev Nurgali	2006 WAKO World Junior Championship, Final	Zadar, Croatia	Decision (3:0)	3	2:00
Wins 2006 WAKO World Junior Championship Full Contact −57kg Gold Medal.
2006-09-	Win	(Russia) Sergey Lipinets	2006 WAKO World Junior Championship, Semi-finals	Zadar, Croatia	Decision	3	2:00
2006-09-	Win	(Iraq) Jafar Hette	2006 WAKO World Junior Championship, Quarterfinals	Zadar, Croatia	KO		
Legend: Win Loss Draw/No contest Notes

== See also ==
- List of male kickboxers
