= Hakim Hamech =

French Muay Thai fighter

- Born: March 22, 1993 (age 33); Perpignan, France
- Height: 169 cm (5 ft 7 in)
- Weight: 60 kg (130 lb; 9.4 st)
- Division: Bantamweight
- Style: Muay Thai
- Stance: Orthodox
- Fighting out of: Lyon, France
- Team: Team Nasser Kacem
- Years active: 2011 - present

Kickboxing record
- Total: 31
- Wins: 18
- By knockout: 10
- Losses: 13
- By knockout: 1

Other information
- Boxing record from BoxRec

Hakim Hamech (born March 22, 1993) is a Moroccan-French Muay Thai fighter. He is the former WBC Muaythai featherweight champion.

== Muaythai career ==
Born in France to Moroccan parents , Hamech made his professional debut against Franck Gross in April 2011. He defeated Gross by decision. He would go on to amass a 3-3 record, before being given a chance to fight Chaichana at La Nuit Des Challenges 13 for the WBC Muay Thai World featherweight title. Hamech won the fight by a first round knockout.

Hamech traded wins and losses over his next four fights, winning against AbdelOuahab Yalmani and Takayuki Nagayama, but losing to Pattaya Lek Sit Sen and Takeru Segawa. He was given the chance to challenge Ryuji Horio for the Krush Super Bantamweight title at Krush 61. Horio won the fight by decision.

Hamech won his next two fights by TKO, against Andrea Castiglione and Javier Lantaron Vizcaino, before losing to Dean James. Hamech then defeated Roman Skulsky and Wang Junguang by decision, as well as Kongyoy THheepakorn by knockout, before losing to Phetmuangchon Por.Suantong by decision. After losing to Phetmuangchon, Hakim went on a three fight winning streak, during which he won the rematch with Franck Gross by decision, and beat Mike Astarita and Yun Qi likewise by decision. Following this winning streak, he went on a three fight losing streak, most notably losing to Astemir Borsov.

Hamech made his ONE Championship debut at ONE: Heroes of Honor against Yukinori Ogasawara. He won the fight by a first round knockout. In his next fight with ONE, Hamech fought Rodtang Jitmuangnon. Hamech lost the fight by decision.

Moving away from ONE, Hamech scored a second round knockout of Plangrith at La Nuit Des Challenges 19. He was next scheduled to fight Nabiyom Tefsai at GVA Fight Night 2. Tefsai won the fight by decision.

Hamech faced Panomdet at La Nuit Des Challenges 20 on December 18, 2021. He won the fight by a first-round knockout.

== Court case ==
Hamech was involved in 2023 in a punishment party in Perpignan: with drug traffickers, he took part in beating, torturing, and raping with a stick a young man.

== Titles and accomplishments ==
- 2014 WBC Muay Thai World -57 kg Champion

== Muay Thai record ==
Professional Kickboxing Record
18 Wins (10 (T)KO's), 13 Losses, 0 Draw, 0 No Contest
| Date | Result | Opponent | Event | Location | Method | Round | Time |
| 2021-12-18 | Win | (Thailand) Panomdet | La Nuit Des Challenges 20 | Saint-Fons, France | KO | 1 | |
| 2020-02-01 | Loss | (Switzerland) Nabiyom Tefsai | GVA Fight Night 2 | Switzerland | Decision | 3 | 3:00 |
| 2019-12-14 | Win | (Thailand) Plangrith | La Nuit Des Challenges 19 | France | KO | 2 | |
| 2019-03-31 | Loss | (Thailand) Rodtang Jitmuangnon | ONE Championship: A New Era | Tokyo, Japan | Decision (Split) | 3 | 3:00 |
| 2018-09-08 | Win | (Japan) Yukinori Ogasawara | ONE Championship: Heroes of Honor | Shanghai, China | KO (Punches) | 1 | 2:59 |
| 2018-04-07 | Loss | (Thailand) Rittijak Kaewsamrit | Muay Thai Grand Prix 15 - Lion Fight 41 | London, England | Decision | 5 | 3:00 |
| 2018-02-24 | Loss | (Thailand) Matee Sotjotoy | Fighting Edition | France | Decision | 5 | 3:00 |
| 2018-01-13 | Loss | (Russia) Astemir Borsov | Glory Of Heroes | China | Decision | 3 | 3:00 |
| 2017-12-23 | Win | (China) Yun Qi | Glory Of Heroes | China | Decision | 3 | 3:00 |
| 2017-04-15 | Win | (Italy) Mike Astarita | Divonne Challenge 3 | France | Decision | 5 | 3:00 |
| 2016-11-19 | Win | (France) Franck Gross | Nuit des Champions 2016 | France | Decision | 3 | 3:00 |
| 2016-10-22 | Loss | (Thailand) Phetmuangchon Por.Suantong | La Nuit Des Challenges 16 | France | Decision | 3 | 3:00 |
| 2016-06-17 | Win | (China) Wang Junguang | Wu Lin Feng | China | Decision | 3 | 3:00 |
| 2016-05-21 | Win | (Thailand) Kongyoy Theepakorn | La Nuit Des Challenges 15 | France | KO | 1 | |
| 2016-04-30 | Win | (Ukraine) Roman Skulsky | MFC 5 | France | Decision | | |
| 2016-03-26 | Loss | (United Kingdom) Dean James | Muay Thai Grand Prix 3 | United Kingdom | Decision | 5 | 3:00 |
| 2016-03-05 | Win | (Spain) Javier Lantaron Vizcaino | MFC 4 | France | TKO | 2 | |
| 2016-01-21 | Win | (Italy) Andrea Castiglione | MFC 3 | France | TKO | 3 | |
| 2015-12-04 | Loss | (Japan) Ryuji Horio | Krush 61 | Tokyo, Japan | Decision | 3 | 3:00 |
For the Krush -55kg title.
| 2015-10-24 | Win | (Japan) Takayuki Nagayama | La Nuit Des Challenges 14 | France | TKO (Doctor Stoppage) | 1 | |
| 2015-07-04 | Loss | (Japan) Takeru | K-1 World GP 2015 -70kg Championship Tournament | Tokyo, Japan | Decision (Unanimous) | 3 | 3:00 |
| 2015-03-06 | Win | (Belgium) AbdelOuahab Yalmani | Muaythai Fighting Championship | France | TKO (Doctor Stoppage) | 2 | |
| 2014-12-05 | Loss | (Thailand) Pattaya Lek Sit Sen | La Ligue des Gladiateurs | Thailand | Decision | 5 | 3:00 |
| 2014-09-20 | Win | (Thailand) Chaichana | La Nuit Des Challenges 13 | France | KO | 1 | |
Wins the WBC Muay Thai World -57kg title.
| 2014-02-08 | Loss | (Thailand) Sam-A Gaiyanghadao | La Nuit Des Titans | Tours, France | KO (elbow) | 4 | |
| 2013-11-09 | Loss | (France) Ayoub El Khaidar | Championnat du Monde Muaythai | France | Decision | 5 | 3:00 |
| 2013-10-26 | Win | (Thailand) Hongtonglek Chor Farpleansee | Röschtigraben Derby 2013 | Switzerland | Decision | 5 | 3:00 |
| 2013-09-21 | Loss | (France) Ayoub El Khaidar | La Nuit Des Challenges 12 | France | Decision | 5 | 3:00 |
| 2013-06-15 | Win | (Thailand) Vatsana Sedone | Ultimate kick-Boxing 3 | France | TKO | 1 | |
| 2012-10-20 | Win | (Thailand) Hongtonglek Chor Farpleansee | Roschtigrabe Derby | Switzerland | Decision | 5 | 3:00 |
| 2011-04-30 | Win | (France) Franck Gross | K1 Rules | France | Decision | 3 | 3:00 |
Legend: Win Loss Draw/No contest Notes

== See also ==
- List of male kickboxers
- List of WBC Muaythai world champions
