= Yuji Takahashi (footballer) =

Japanese footballer

Yuji Takahashi 高橋 祐治
Personal information
- Full name: Yuji Takahashi
- Date of birth: 11 April 1993 (age 33)
- Place of birth: Ōtsu, Shiga, Japan
- Height: 1.87 m (6 ft 2 in)
- Position: Centre back

Team information
- Current team: Shimizu S-Pulse
- Number: 3

Youth career
- Kyoto Shiko SC
- 2006–2011: Kyoto Sanga

Senior career*
Years	Team	Apps	(Gls)
2012–2017	Kyoto Sanga	40	(0)
2012–2013	→ Brisbane Roar (loan)	4	(0)
2014	→ J. League U-22 (loan)	11	(1)
2015	→ Kamatamare Sanuki (loan)	32	(1)
2018–2019	Sagan Tosu	59	(1)
2020–2022	Kashiwa Reysol	53	(1)
2023–	Shimizu S-Pulse	84	(1)
- * Club domestic league appearances and goals as of 15 September 2025

Yuji Takahashi (高橋 祐治, Takahashi Yūji; born 11 April 1993) is a Japanese footballer who plays as a centre back for J1 League club Shimizu S-Pulse.

== Early and personal life ==
Takahashi was born in Ōtsu, Shiga Prefecture to a Filipino mother and Japanese father. He has two elder sisters, Maryjun and Yu, who are both models and actresses, and an older brother.

On 15 February 2019, Takahashi married former AKB48 and JKT48 member Aki Takajo. The couple has two sons born November 2019 and September 2022 respectively.

== Club career ==
On 30 August 2012, it was announced Takahashi would join Australian club Brisbane Roar FC on loan for the 2012–13 A-League. Takahashi would make his debut, albeit a short one, against Wellington Phoenix at Westpac Stadium, replacing Jack Hingert in the 90th minute. Takahashi played his second game for Brisbane Roar on 1 December 2012, coming on as a substitute.

== International career ==
Takahashi has represented Japan at both U18 and U19 levels and in late 2011 took part in 2012 AFC U-19 Championship qualification.

== Club statistics ==
As of 2 March 2023.

Appearances and goals by club, season and competition
Club	Season	League			Emperor's Cup		J.League Cup		Total	
Club	Season	Division	Apps	Goals	Apps	Goals	Apps	Goals	Apps	Goals
Kyoto Sanga FC	2012	J2 League	0	0	0	0	–		0	0
Kyoto Sanga FC	2014	J2 League	1	0	1	0	–		2	0
Kyoto Sanga FC	2016	J2 League	16 (Note: Includes J1/J2 play-off game)	0	0	0	–		16	0
Kyoto Sanga FC	2017	J2 League	23	0	1	0	–		24	0
Kyoto Sanga FC	Total		40	0	2	0	0	0	42	0
Brisbane Roar (loan)	2012–13	A-League	4	0	–		–		4	0
J.League U-22 (loan)	2014	J3 League	11	1	–		–		11	1
Kamatamare Sanuki (loan)	2015	J2 League	32	1	2	0	–		34	1
Sagan Tosu	2018	J1 League	30	1	4	0	6	1	40	2
Sagan Tosu	2019	J1 League	29	0	4	0	4	0	37	0
Sagan Tosu	Total		59	1	8	0	10	1	77	2
Kashiwa Reysol	2020	J1 League	10	0	0	0	1	0	11	0
Kashiwa Reysol	2021	J1 League	14	0	2	0	0	0	16	0
Kashiwa Reysol	2022	J1 League	29	1	2	1	1	0	32	2
Kashiwa Reysol	Total		53	1	4	1	2	0	59	2
Shimizu S-Pulse	2023	J2 League	2	0	0	0	0	0	2	0
Career total			201	4	16	1	12	1	229	6
