= Chalermdet Sor.Tawanrung =

Thai Muay Thai fighter

Chalermdet
- Born: Teerapong Dee; June 27, 1987 (age 39); Thung Tako district, Chumphon province, Thailand
- Other names: Chalermdeth Infinity (เฉลิมเดช อินฟินิตี้); Chalermdet Luknawee (เฉลิมเดช ลูกนาวี)
- Height: 169 cm (5 ft 7 in)
- Weight: 57 kg (126 lb; 9.0 st)
- Style: Muay Thai
- Stance: Southpaw
- Fighting out of: Thailand
- Team: Sakpanya / Sor.Tawanrung
- Trainer: Dechasubin Or.Siriwut

Other information
- Boxing record from BoxRec

Teerapong Dee (Thai: ธีระพงษ์ ดี) known professionally as Chalermdet Sor.Tawanrung (Thai: เฉลิมเดช ส.ตะวันรุ่ง) is a Thai Muay Thai fighter and boxer.

== Career ==
Chalermdet made a name on the muay thai scene by winning his first 20 fights in the major Bangkok stadiums between 2002 and 2004 until he lost to Kwanjai Sit Phuphantung.

On April 30, 2016, Chalermdet faced Farid Chalal at Thai Fight Samui 2016. He won the fight by third round knockout with a high kick.

Chalermdet became a Thailand Super Bantamweight champion and a Lumpinee Stadium Featherweight champion as well as the 2007 Gaiyanghadao tournament winner. In his career he defeated notable champions such as Pettawee Sor Kittichai, Wuttidet Lukprabat, Nong-O Gaiyanghadao, Kaew Fairtex or Jomthong Chuwattana.

Following his retirement from the Bangkok circuit Chalermdet kept taking fights in parallel of his work as ranger in the Marine Division. He had multiple fights in Cambodia including one against local champion Keo Rumchong on September 2, 2018.

On October 28, 2023, Chalermdet made his professional boxing debut, defeating Theepakorn Pankasem by unanimous decision.

On December 12, 2023, Chalermdet made a return to muay thai rules when he defeated Xrisanthos Varfis by decision at the GOAT live Lumpinee event.

== Titles and accomplishments ==
=== Professional ===
- Professional Boxing Association of Thailand (PAT)
  - 2006 Thailand Featherweight (122 lbs) Champion
    - One successful title defense
- Lumpinee Stadium
  - 2008 Lumpinee Stadium Featherweight (126 lbs) Champion
    - One successful title defense
- Gaiyanghadao Tournament
  - 2007 Gaiyanghadao Marathon Tournament Winner

=== Amateur ===
- International Federation of Muaythai Associations
  - 2012 IFMA World Championships -67 kg (bronze)
- World Combat Games
  - 2010 World Combat Games Muaythai -71 kg (gold)

== Fight record ==
Muay Thai record
Date	Result	Opponent	Event	Location	Method	Round	Time
2023-12-12	Win	(Greece) Xrisanthos Varfis	GOAT Live Lumpinee, Lumpinee Stadium	Bangkok, Thailand	Decision	3	3:00
2018-09-02	Loss	(Cambodia) Keo Rumchong	Bayon TV Carabao Kun Khmer	Phnom Penh, Cambodia	Decision	5	3:00
2018-03-30	Loss	(Cambodia) Prom Samnang	Bayon TV	Phnom Penh, Cambodia	TKO (Referee stoppage)	2	2:52
2016-04-30	Win	(Algeria) Farid Chalal	Thai Fight Samui 2016	Ko Samui, Thailand	KO (High kick)	3	
2016-02-28	Draw	(Cambodia) Bird Kham	Bayon TV	Phnom Penh, Cambodia	Decision	5	3:00
2011-09-08	Loss	(Russia) Aleksei Ulianov	Elite Fight Night Russia	Tyumen, Russia	Decision	5	3:00
2011-02-26	Loss	(Russia) Igor Petrov	SFM: Ice Storm 3	Nefteyugansk, Russia	Decision	5	3:00
2010-10-23	Loss	(Thailand) Nilamon Kaennorasing	Bangla Stadium	Phuket, Thailand	Ref.stop. (Chalermdet dismissed)		
2008-09-26	Loss	(Thailand) Daoprakai Sor.Sommai	Wanboonya, Lumpinee Stadium	Bangkok, Thailand	Decision	5	3:00
2008-08-16	Loss	(Thailand) Singdam Kiatmuu9	Omnoi Stadium	Samut Sakhon, Thailand	Decision	5	3:00
2008-07-04	Loss	(Thailand) Pansak Luk.Bor.Kor	Lumpinee Champion Krikrai, Lumpinee Stadium	Bangkok, Thailand	Decision	5	3:00
Loses the Lumpinee Stadium Featherweight (126 lbs) title.
2008-05-02	Loss	(Thailand) Pansak Luk.Bor.Kor	Lumpinee Champion Krikrai, Lumpinee Stadium	Bangkok, Thailand	Decision	5	3:00
2008-03-28	Draw	(Thailand) Longern Pitakkruchaidaen	Lumpinee Champion Krikrai, Lumpinee Stadium	Bangkok, Thailand	Decision	5	3:00
Defends the Lumpinee Stadium Featherweight (126 lbs) title.
2008-02-05	Win	(Thailand) Nong-O Sit.Or	Lumpinee Krikkrai, Lumpinee Stadium	Bangkok, Thailand	Decision	5	3:00
Wins the Lumpinee Stadium Featherweight (126 lbs) title.
2007-12-20	Win	(Thailand) Jomthong Chuwattana	Daorungchujaroen, Rajadamnern Stadium	Bangkok, Thailand	Decision	5	3:00
2007-11-29	Win	(Thailand) Sarawut Lukbanyai	Gaiyanghadao Tournament, Final	Bangkok, Thailand	Decision	3	3:00
Wins 2007 Gaiyanghadao Marathon Tournament title.
2007-11-29	Win	(Thailand) Trijak Sitjomtrai	Gaiyanghadao Tournament, Semifinals	Bangkok, Thailand	Decision	3	3:00
2007-11-29	Win	(Thailand) Kaew Fairtex	Gaiyanghadao Tournament, Quarterfinals	Bangkok, Thailand	Decision	3	3:00
2007-09-07	Loss	(Thailand) Sagetdao Petpayathai	Lumpinee Stadium	Bangkok, Thailand	Decision	5	3:00
For the vacant Lumpinee Stadium Featherweight (126 lbs) title.
2007-07-05	Loss	(Thailand) Anuwat Kaewsamrit	Daorungchujaroen, Rajadamnern Stadium	Bangkok, Thailand	Decision	5	3:00
2007-05-08	Win	(Thailand) Ronnachai Naratreekul	Khunsuktrakunhyang, Rajadamnern Stadium	Bangkok, Thailand	Decision	5	3:00
2007-04-03	Win	(Thailand) Longern Phitakruchaidaen	Petchyindee, Lumpinee Stadium	Bangkok, Thailand	KO	4	
2007-03-06	Win	(Thailand) Nong-O Sit.Or	Wanboonya, Lumpinee Stadium	Bangkok, Thailand	TKO	2	
2007-02-13	Loss	(Thailand) Wuttidet Lukprabat	Lumpinee Stadium	Bangkok, Thailand	Decision	5	3:00
2006-11-24	Win	(Thailand) Traijak Sitjomtri	Lumpinee Stadium	Bangkok, Thailand	KO	4	
2006-10-17	Win	(Thailand) Denkiri Sor.Sommai	Petchpiya, Lumpinee Stadium	Bangkok, Thailand	Decision	5	3:00
2006-08-18	Win	(Thailand) Supachailek Sitkomson	Petchyindee, Lumpinee Stadium	Bangkok, Thailand	Decision	5	3:00
2006-05-11	Win	(Thailand) Kongdej Kitpraphat	Petchaophraya, Rajadamnern Stadium	Bangkok, Thailand	Decision	5	3:00
2006-	Win	(Thailand) Srikung Romsrithong	Lumpinee Stadium	Bangkok, Thailand	Decision	5	3:00
2006-03-29	Win	(Thailand) Denkiri 13CoinsResort	Petchaophraya, Rajadamnern Stadium	Bangkok, Thailand	Decision	5	3:00
2006-01-31	Win	(Thailand) Wuttidet Lukprabat	Wanboonya, Lumpinee Stadium	Bangkok, Thailand	Decision	5	3:00
2005-12-09	Win	(Thailand) Yutthakan Thungsongthaksin	Petchyindee, Lumpinee Stadium	Bangkok, Thailand	Decision	5	3:00
Defends the Thailand Featherweight (122 lbs) title.
2005-11-03	Loss	(Thailand) Yutthakan Thungsongthaksin	Rajadamnern Stadium	Bangkok, Thailand	Decision	5	3:00
2005-09-16	Loss	(Thailand) Traijak Sitjomtrai	Petchpiya, Lumpinee Stadium	Bangkok, Thailand	Decision	5	3:00
2005-07-19	Win	(Thailand) Traijak Sitjomtrai	Petchyindee, Lumpinee Stadium	Bangkok, Thailand	Decision	5	3:00
2005-06-17	Win	(Thailand) Pettawee Sor Kittichai	Wanboonya, Lumpinee Stadium	Bangkok, Thailand	Decision	5	3:00
2005-05-06	Win	(Thailand) Pettawee Sor Kittichai	Phetyindee + Kor.Sapaotong, Lumpinee Stadium	Bangkok, Thailand	Decision	5	3:00
Wins the Thailand Featherweight (122 lbs) title.
2005-03-22	Win	(Thailand) Santiphap Kor.Saphaothong	Wanboonnya, Lumpinee Stadium	Bangkok, Thailand	Decision	5	3:00
2005-02-19	Win	(Thailand) Wuttichai Sor.Yupinda	Lumpinee Champion Krikrai, Lumpinee Stadium	Bangkok, Thailand	KO	2	
2004-09-07	Loss	(Thailand) Pokaew Fonjangchonburi	Petchyindee, Lumpinee Stadium	Bangkok, Thailand	Ref.stop. (Chalermdet dismissed)	5	
2004-07-20	Loss	(Thailand) Sam-A Tor.Rattanakiat	Petchyindee, Lumpinee Stadium	Bangkok, Thailand	Decision	5	3:00
2004-06-15	Win	(Thailand) Kangwanlek Petchyindee	Petchburapha, Lumpinee Stadium	Bangkok, Thailand	Decision	5	3:00
2004-04-23	Loss	(Thailand) Kwanjai Sit Phuphantung	Wanboonya, Lumpinee Stadium	Bangkok, Thailand	Decision	5	3:00
2004-03-26	Win	(Thailand) Duangsompong Por.Khumpai	Petchyindee + Wanwiraphon, Lumpinee Stadium	Bangkok, Thailand	Decision	5	3:00
2004-02-21	Win	(Thailand) Kangwanlek Petchyindee	Lumpinee Stadium	Bangkok, Thailand	Decision	5	3:00
2004-01-20	Win	(Thailand) Kompayak Fairtex	Fairtex, Lumpinee Stadium	Bangkok, Thailand	Decision	5	3:00
2003-12-23	Win	(Thailand) Paitharit Sor.Kitichai	Petchyindee, Lumpinee Stadium	Bangkok, Thailand	Decision	5	3:00
2003-11-07	Win	(Thailand) Denkiri Kiatkesorn	Sangsawangphanpla, Lumpinee Stadium	Bangkok, Thailand	KO	3	
2003-	Win	(Thailand) Montien Maimuangkon		Thailand	Decision	5	3:00
2003-08-29	Win	(Thailand) Dansayam Sor.Bunya	Fairtex, Lumpinee Stadium	Bangkok, Thailand	KO	3	
2003-07-08	Win	(Thailand) Nueathorn Phuengphanlachai	Fairtex, Lumpinee Stadium	Bangkok, Thailand	KO	4	
2003-06-03	Win	(Thailand) Dansayam Sor.Bunya	Petchyindee, Lumpinee Stadium	Bangkok, Thailand	Decision	5	3:00
Legend: Win Loss Draw/No contest Notes

Amateur Muay Thai record
Date	Result	Opponent	Event	Location	Method	Round	Time
2012-09-11	Loss	(Belarus) Andrei Kulebin	2012 IFMA World Championships, Semi-finals	Saint Petersburg, Russia	Decision	4	2:00
Wins 2012 IFMA World Championships -67kg Bronze medal.
2012-09-09	Win	(France) Fabrice Delannon	2012 IFMA World Championships, Quarter-finals	Saint Petersburg, Russia	Decision	4	2:00
2010-09-02	Win	(Sweden) Marcus Öberg	2010 World Combat Games, Final -71 kg	Beijing, China	Decision (3-2)	4	2:00
Wins SportAccord Combat Games Muay Thai -71kg Gold medal.
2010-08-31	Win	(Ukraine) Artur Kyshenko	2010 World Combat Games, Semi Finals -71 kg	Beijing, China	Decision	4	2:00
2010-08-29	Win		2010 World Combat Games, Quarter Finals -71 kg	Beijing, China	Decision	4	2:00
Legend: Win Loss Draw/No contest Notes
