= Wuttidet Lukprabat =

Thai former professional Muay Thai fighter and amateur Wushu fighter

- Born: Kwanyuen Chantra'; March 14, 1981 (age 45); Muak Lek, Saraburi, Thailand
- Native name: ขวัญยืน จันทรา
- Height: 167 cm (5 ft 6 in)
- Division: Bantamweight; Super Bantamweight
- Style: Muay Thai (Muay Khao)
- Stance: Orthodox
- Team: Lukprabat
- Trainer: Gingtong Lukprabat

Kwanyuen Chantra (Thai: ขวัญยืน จันทรา born March 14, 1981), known professionally as Wuttidet Lukprabat (Thai: วุฒิเดช ลูกพระบาท), is a Thai former professional Muay Thai fighter and amateur wushu fighter. He was the 2007 Sports Writers Association of Thailand Fighter of the Year. The next year his gym the Lukprabat camp won the award for gym of the year.

== Titles and accomplishments ==
- Professional Boxing Association of Thailand (PAT)
  - 2008 Thailand Super Bantamweight Bantamweight (122 lbs) Champion
- Omnoi Stadium
  - 2006 Omnoi Stadium Bantamweight (118 lbs) Champion

Awards

- 2007 Lumpinee Stadium Fighter of the Year
- 2007 Sports Writers Association of Thailand Fighter of the Year
- 2007 Siam Sports Fighter of the Year

== Fight record ==
Muay Thai record
90 Wins, 27 Losses, 3 Draws
Date	Result	Opponent	Event	Location	Method	Round	Time
2011-09-11	Loss	(Japan) Genji Umeno	M-1 FAIRTEX Muay Thai Challenge RAORAK MUAY vol.3	Tokyo, Japan	KO (Right Elbow)	4	2:23
2011-07-08	Loss	(Thailand) Lekkla Thanasuranakorn	Daorungprabat, Lumpinee Stadium	Bangkok, Thailand	KO	2	
2011-06-09	Win	(Thailand) Lekkla Thanasuranakorn	Daorungprabat, Rajadamnern Stadium	Bangkok, Thailand	Decision	5	3:00
2010-08-10	Loss	(Thailand) Pettawee Sor Kittichai	Petchpiya + Jor.Por.Ror.7, Lumpinee Stadium	Bangkok, Thailand	Decision	5	3:00
2010-07-13	Win	(Thailand) F-16 Rachanon	Ruamnamjai Wongkarnmuay Fight, Lumpinee Stadium	Bangkok, Thailand	Decision	5	3:00
2009-10-12	Loss	(Thailand) Anuwat Kaewsamrit	Muaythai Open 9: Road to Real King XIII	Japan	KO (Right punch)	3	
2009-09-04	Loss	(Thailand) Sam-A Gaiyanghadao	Lumpinee Stadium	Bangkok, Thailand	Decision	5	3:00
Loses the Thailand Super Bantamweight (122 lbs) title.
2009-07-03	Loss	(Thailand) Pornsanae Sitmonchai	Lumpinee Stadium	Bangkok, Thailand	TKO	2	
2009-02-06	Loss	(Thailand) Petchboonchu FA Group	Lumpinee Stadium	Bangkok, Thailand	Decision	5	3:00
2009-01-18	Win	(Japan) Shinichiro Ono	Muaylok Japan 2009 - Saidai Saikyou no Muay Thai Matsuri	Tokyo, Japan	Decision (Unanimous)	5	3:00
2008-12-09	Loss	(Thailand) Nong-O Gaiyanghadao	Lumpinee Champion Krikkrai Fight	Bangkok, Thailand	Decision	5	3:00
2008-10-31	Win	(Thailand) Kanchai Fairtex	Kriekrai Fights, Lumpinee Stadium	Bangkok, Thailand	Decision	5	3:00
Wins the Thailand Super Bantamweight (122 lbs) title.
2008-09-30	Win	(Thailand) Petchboonchu FA Group	Lumpinee Stadium	Bangkok, Thailand	Decision	5	3:00
2008-09-04	Win	(Thailand) Nong-O Gaiyanghadao	Daorungprabath Fights, Rajadamnern Stadium	Bangkok, Thailand	TKO	4	
2008-08-08	Loss	(Thailand) Saenchai Sor Kingstar	Kriekrai Fights, Lumpinee Stadium	Bangkok, Thailand	Decision	5	3:00
2008-07-04	Win	(Thailand) Saenchai Sor Kingstar	Kriekrai Fights, Lumpinee Stadium	Bangkok, Thailand	Decision	5	3:00
2008-06-04	Win	(Thailand) Kanchai Fairtex	Sor.Sommai, Rajadamnern Stadium	Bangkok, Thailand	TKO	3	
2008-05-02	Win	(Thailand) Denkiri Sor.Sommai	Kriekrai Fights, Lumpinee Stadium	Bangkok, Thailand	TKO	3	
2008-03-28	Draw	(Thailand) Detnarong Wor.Sangprapai	Lumpinee Stadium	Bangkok, Thailand	Decision	5	3:00
For the Lumpinee Stadium Super Bantamweight (122 lbs) title.
2008-02-05	Win	(Thailand) Sam-A Gaiyanghadao	Lumpinee Stadium	Bangkok, Thailand	Decision	5	3:00
2007-12-	Win	(Thailand) Detnarong Wor.Sangprapai	Lumpinee Stadium	Bangkok, Thailand	Decision	5	3:00
2007-11-06	Win	(Thailand) Detnarong Wor.Sangprapai	Petchpiya, Lumpinee Stadium	Bangkok, Thailand	Decision	5	3:00
2007-10-	Win	(Thailand) Captainken Naruepai	Rajadamnern Stadium	Bangkok, Thailand	Decision	5	3:00
2007-09-13	Loss	(Thailand) Detnarong Wor.Sangprapai	Rajadamnern Stadium	Bangkok, Thailand	Decision	5	3:00
For the vacant Thailand Bantamweight (118 lbs) title.
2007-08-17	Win	(Thailand) Fahmeechai F.A.Group	Wanboonya, Lumpinee Stadium	Bangkok, Thailand	Decision	5	3:00
2007-07-03	Win	(Thailand) Mongkonchai Phetsupaphan	Phetchpiya, Lumpinee Stadium	Bangkok, Thailand	Decision	5	3:00
2007-05-18	Draw	(Thailand) Captainken Naruepai	Lumpinee Stadium	Bangkok, Thailand	Decision	5	3:00
2007-04-13	Win	(Thailand) Rittidet Sombatcharoen	Lumpinee Stadium	Bangkok, Thailand	KO	3	
2007-03-06	Win	(Thailand) Mongkonchai Phetsupaphan	Wanboonya, Lumpinee Stadium	Bangkok, Thailand	Decision	5	3:00
2007-02-13	Win	(Thailand) Chalermdet Sor.Tawanrung	Lumpinee Stadium	Bangkok, Thailand	Decision	5	3:00
2007-01-10	Draw	(Thailand) Denkiri Sor.Sommai	Rajadamnern Stadium	Bangkok, Thailand	Decision	5	3:00
2006-10-06	Win	(Thailand) Pinsiam Sor.Amnuaysirichoke	Eminentair, Lumpinee Stadium	Bangkok, Thailand	Decision	5	3:00
2006-09-07	Loss	(Thailand) Denkiri Sor.Sommai	Rajadamnern Stadium	Bangkok, Thailand	Decision	5	3:00
2006-07-21	Loss	(Thailand) Nong-O Gaiyanghadao	Wanboonya Fights, Lumpinee Stadium	Bangkok, Thailand	TKO	2	
2006-05-02	Loss	(Thailand) Petchmanee Petsupapan	Petsupapan, Lumpinee Stadium	Bangkok, Thailand	Decision	5	3:00
2006-03-31	Draw	(Thailand) Nong-O Gaiyanghadao	Lumpinee Stadium	Bangkok, Thailand	Decision	5	3:00
2006-01-31	Loss	(Thailand) Chalermdet Sor.Tawanrung	Wanboonya Fights, Lumpinee Stadium	Bangkok, Thailand	Decision	5	3:00
2005-12-02	Loss	(Thailand) Captainken Naruepai	Lumpinee Stadium	Bangkok, Thailand	Decision	5	3:00
2005-10-24	Win	(Thailand) Pinsiam Sor.Amnuaysirichoke		Phetchaburi Province, Thailand	Decision	5	3:00
2005-09-22	Win	(Thailand) Phetek Kiatyongyut	OneSongchai, Rajadamnern Stadium	Bangkok, Thailand	Decision	5	3:00
2005-08-19	Win	(Thailand) Sarawut Lukbanyai	Petchsupapan, Lumpinee Stadium	Bangkok, Thailand	Decision	5	3:00
2005-02-28	Loss	(Thailand) Anuwat Kaewsamrit	Daorungprabath Fights, Rajadamnern Stadium	Bangkok, Thailand	Decision	5	3:00
2005-01-11	Win	(Thailand) Sueahuallek Chor.Sopipong	Lumpinee Stadium	Bangkok, Thailand	Decision	5	3:00
2004-11-02	Draw	(Thailand) Pinsiam Sor.Amnuaysirichoke	Lumpinee Stadium	Bangkok, Thailand	Decision	5	3:00
2004-10-11	Win	(Thailand) Wanmeechai Meenayothin	Rajadamnern Stadium	Bangkok, Thailand	Decision	5	3:00
2004-09-02	Win	(Thailand) Ronnachai Naratreekul	Onesongchai, Rajadamnern Stadium	Bangkok, Thailand	Decision	5	3:00
2004-07-13	Loss	(Thailand) Ngathao Attharungroj	Petchsupapan, Lumpinee Stadium	Bangkok, Thailand	Decision	5	3:00
2004-06-11	Win	(Thailand) Phetek Sitjawai	Kiatpetch, Lumpinee Stadium	Bangkok, Thailand	Decision	5	3:00
2004-04-21	Win	(Thailand) Sam-A Gaiyanghadao	Rajadamnern Stadium	Bangkok, Thailand	Decision	5	3:00
2004-02-12	Loss	(Thailand) Wanmeechai Meenayothin	Rajadamnern Stadium	Bangkok, Thailand	Decision	5	3:00
2003-11-14	Win	(Thailand) Kaew Fairtex	World Boxing WBC, Lumpinee Stadium	Bangkok, Thailand	Decision	5	3:00
2003-09-21	Win	(Thailand) Orono Sor.Sakulphan	OneSongchai, Rajadamnern Stadium	Bangkok, Thailand	Decision	5	3:00
2003-08-31	Win	(Thailand) Phongsing Kiatchansing	OneSongchai, Rajadamnern Stadium	Bangkok, Thailand	Decision	5	3:00
2003-07-10	Win	(Thailand) Kornphet Petchrachabat	Rajadamnern Stadium	Bangkok, Thailand	Decision	5	3:00
2003-02-26		(Thailand) Sayannoi Kiatpraphat	Rajadamnern Stadium	Bangkok, Thailand			
2002-12-23	Loss	(Thailand) Klairung Sor.Chaichroen	Onesongchai, Rajadamnern Stadium	Bangkok, Thailand	Decision	5	3:00
2002-10-09	Win	(Thailand) Ronnachai Naratreekul	Wansongchai + Palangnum, Rajadamnern Stadium	Bangkok, Thailand	Decision	5	3:00
2002-09-09	Win	(Thailand) Thongchai Tor.Silachai	Rajadamnern Stadium	Bangkok, Thailand	Decision	5	3:00
2002-07-09	Win	(Thailand) Monmeechai Meenayothin	Petchsupapan, Lumpinee Stadium	Bangkok, Thailand	Decision	5	3:00
2002-04-22	Loss	(Thailand) Puja Sor.Suwanee	Onesongchai, Rajadamnern Stadium	Bangkok, Thailand	Decision	5	3:00
2002-03-20	Loss	(Thailand) Bovy Sor Udomson	Rajadamnern Stadium	Bangkok, Thailand	Decision	5	3:00
2001-07-14	Win	(Thailand) Vesaknoi Kiatpraphat	Daorungprabath, Lumpinee Stadium	Bangkok, Thailand	Decision	5	3:00
2001-05-22	Win	(Thailand) Yodradab Kiatpayathai	Lumpinee Stadium	Bangkok, Thailand	Decision	5	3:00
2000-12-16	Win	(Thailand) Rungjarat Pichitmarn	Omnoi Stadium	Samut Sakhon, Thailand	TKO	3	
2000-11-18	Win	(Thailand) Namphet Chor.Ketratanakul	Omnoi Stadium	Samut Sakhon, Thailand	Decision	5	3:00
2000-10-28	Win	(Thailand) Leonard Jirapat5	Omnoi Stadium	Samut Sakhon, Thailand	Decision	5	3:00
2000-08-24	Win	(Thailand) Sitrak Asavayothin	Lumpinee Stadium	Bangkok, Thailand	Decision	5	3:00
2000-05-26	Loss	(Thailand) Phet-Ek Sitjaopho	Rajadamnern Stadium	Bangkok, Thailand	TKO (Elbow)	4	
2000-03-07	Loss	(Thailand) Muangsamut Luksamut	Lumpinee Stadium	Bangkok, Thailand	Decision	5	3:00
1999-	Win	(Thailand) Rungjarat Phichitmarn	Omnoi Stadium	Samut Sakhon, Thailand	KO	3	
1999-09-25	Loss	(Thailand) Petchchawang Asvayothin	Omnoi Stadium	Samut Sakhon, Thailand	Decision	5	3:00
1999-06-24	Win	(Thailand) Prasertchai Sor.Sakulwong	Lumpinee Stadium	Bangkok, Thailand	Decision	5	3:00
1999-04-19	Win	(Thailand) Morakotdaeng Sitsei		Bangkok, Thailand	Decision	5	3:00
1999-01-07		(Thailand) Pokaew Fonjangchonburi		Thailand			
1998-04-18	Loss	(Thailand) Pokaew Fonjangchonburi	Omnoi Stadium	Samut Sakhon, Thailand	Decision	5	3:00
Legend: Win Loss Draw/No contest Notes
