= Pinsiam Sor.Amnuaysirichoke =

Thai Muay Thai fighter

- Born: May 27, 1980 (age 46); Surin Province, Thailand
- Other names: Pinsiam Saengmorakot; Pinsiam Maki; Pinsiam BOM
- Nationality: Thai
- Height: 162 cm (5 ft 4 in)
- Weight: 58 kg (128 lb; 9.1 st)
- Fighting out of: Aichi Prefecture, Japan
- Team: Saengmorakot; Maki Aichi Gym; BOM Sports Gym Oita

Pinsiam Sor.Amnuaysirichoke (ปิ่นสยาม ส.อำนวยศิริโชค) is a Thai Muay Thai fighter living in Japan since 2011.

== Titles and accomplishments ==
- Battle of MuayThai
  - 2022 BoM Super Featherweight Champion
- Hosst Cup
  - 2020 Hoost Cup Japan Lightweight Champion
- Martial Arts Japan Kickboxing Federation
  - 2014 MAJKF Featherweight Champion
- Lumpinee Stadium
  - 2007 Lumpinee Stadium 122 lbs Champion
  - 2004 Lumpinee Stadium 118 lbs Champion
  - 2004 Lumpinee Stadium Fighter of the Year
  - 2004 Lumpinee Stadium Fight of the Year (vs. Ngathao Attharungroj)
- Omnoi Stadium
  - Omnoi Stadium 118 lbs Champion
  - 2002 Isuzu Cup Tournament Winner

== Fight record ==
Muay Thai Record
Date	Result	Opponent	Event	Location	Method	Round	Time
2023-11-26	Draw	(Japan) Kiyomitsu Samuel Nagasawa	Kick Insist 17	Tokyo, Japan	Decision (Majority)	3	3:00
2023-07-09	Loss	(Japan) Takehiko Umezawa	Bom 41 & BOM 42 × U-NEXT presents ROAD TO ONE	Tokyo, Japan	KO (High kick)	4	0:28
2022-09-23	Win	(Japan) Ryuya Kawahara	The Battle of Muay Thai "OUROBOROS"	Tokyo, Japan	Decision (Unanimous)	3	3:00
2022-07-03	Win	(Japan) Takehiko Umezawa	BOM 36	Yokohama, Japan	Decision (Unanimous)	5	3:00
Wins the vacant Battle of MuayThai Super Featherweight title.
2022-04-24	Win	(Japan) Raiyaman	BOM WAVE 08 – Get Over The COVID-19	Beppu, Japan	TKO (Punches)	2	
2021-07-11	Win	(Japan) Hiro Yamato	NJKF - Yamato Gym 50th Anniversary Yamato Matsuri	Nagoya, Japan	Decision (Unanimous)	3	3:00
2020-12-27	Win	(Japan) Yohei Sakurai	HOOST CUP KINGS NAGOYA 8	Nagoya, Japan	Decision (Unanimous)	3	3:00
Wins Hoost Cup Japan Lightweight title.
2020-10-18	Win	(Japan) Junpei Hisai	HOOST CUP KINGS OSAKA 5	Osaka, Japan	Decision (Majority)	3	3:00
2019-12-15	Win	(Bolivia) Henry Cejas	HOOST CUP KINGS NAGOYA 7	Nagoya, Japan	Ext.R Decision (Split)	4	3:00
2018-09-24	Win	(Japan) Tatsumi	Suk Wanchai MuayThai Super Fight vol.5	Nagoya, Japan	TKO	3	
2018-05-20	Win	(Brazil) Fabricio Zacarias	HOOST CUP KINGS NAGOYA 4	Nagoya, Japan	Decision (Unanimous)	3	3:00
2017-12-10	Loss	(Japan) Yota Shigemori	KNOCK OUT 2017 in Ryogoku	Tokyo, Japan	Decision (Unanimous)	5	3:00
2017-09-30	Win	(Japan) Yuma Yamaguchi	HOOST CUP～KINGS NAGOYA 3～	Nagoya, Japan	Decision (Unanimous)	3	3:00
2017-08-06	Win	(Thailand) Chao Rocket	Suk Wanchai Muay Thai Super Fight	Nagoya, Japan	Decision (Unanimous)	5	3:00
2016-12-04	Win	(Japan) Hideki Kuze	BOM The Battle Of Muaythai XIII	Kanagawa, Japan	Decision (Unanimous)	5	3:00
2016-06-19	Win	(China) Gong Yuankun	Wanchai + Kingthong Muay Thai Super Fight	Nagoya, Japan	TKO (Punches)	4	2:15
2016-04-10	Win	(Japan) Fumihiro Uesugi	MAJKF Murakami Vol.1	Aichi Prefecture, Japan	Decision (Majority)	3	3:00
2015-12-27	Win	(Japan) Yuya	HOOST CUP～KINGS NAGOYA～	Nagoya, Japan	Decision (Unanimous)	3	3:00
2015-10-03	Win	(Japan) Naguranchun Masa M16	SHOOT BOXING THE LAST BOMB	Osaka, Japan	TKO	3	1:52
2015-07-19	Win	(Japan) Hisaaki Nakamukai	MAJKF TRADITION.4	Tokyo, Japan	TKO (3 Knockdowns)	2	2:40
2015-05-02	Win	(Japan) Yosuke Morii	ZONE 2	Kanagawa, Japan	Decision (Majority)	5	3:00
2014-12-27	Win	(Japan) Heihachi Nakajima	HOOST CUP forever	Nagoya, Japan	Decision (Unanimous)	3	3:00
2014-11-16	Win	(Japan) Koij Ikegami	HOOST CUP KINGS WEST	Osaka, Japan	Ext.R Decision (Unanimous)	4	3:00
2014-08-10	Win	(Japan) Ikki	MAJKF KICK GUTS 2014	Tokyo, Japan	Decision (Unanimous)	5	3:00
Defends the MAJKF Featherweight title.
2014-06-22	Win	(Japan) King Kohei	HOOST CUP・SPIRIT4	Kyoto, Japan	TKO	1	2:10
2014-04-13	Win	(Japan) Kosuke Komiyama	MAJKF DRAGON.5 ～THE ONE AND ONLY～	Tokyo, Japan	Decision (Majority)	3	3:00
2014-01-19	Win	(Japan) Ryo Pegasus	MAJKF DRAGON.4 ～THE ONE AND ONLY～	Tokyo, Japan	TKO	2	0:58
Wins the MAJKF Featherweight title.
2013-08-10	Win	(Japan) Motoki	MAJKF KICK GUTS 2013	Tokyo, Japan	KO	2	0:46
2013-06-16	Draw	(Japan) Daichi Yamato	HOOST CUP KINGS	Nagoya, Japan	Decision	3	3:00
2013-04-14	Win	(Japan) Kenryu	MAJKF DRAGON ROAD ONE AND ONLY TAKE 1	Kanagawa, Japan	KO	2	0:50
2013-02-24	Win	(Japan) Fukashi	HOOST CUP	Aichi, Japan	Decision (Unanimous)	3	3:00
2012-09-09	Loss	(Japan) Sota Ichinohe	M-1 Muay Thai Challenge Sutt Yod Muaythai vol.3 Part 2	Aichi Prefecture, Japan	Decision (Unanimous)	5	3:00
2012-07-15	Draw	(Japan) Keisuke Miyamoto	MAJKF KICK GUTS 2012	Tokyo, Japan	Decision	3	3:00
2012-03-31	Loss	(Thailand) Tapaotong Eminentair	Ladprao Stadium	Bangkok, Thailand	KO	4	
2011-07-24	Loss	(Japan) Hiroki Akimoto	MAJKF J-1 time ～signal of start～	Aichi Prefecture, Japan	KO (Left Hook to the Body)	2	0:54
2011-07-02	Loss	(Thailand) Rungphet Wor Rungniran	Channel 7 Stadium	Bangkok, Thailand	Decision	5	3:00
2010-	Win	(Thailand) Rittidet Wor.Wantawee	Lumpinee Stadium	Bangkok, Thailand	Decision	5	3:00
2010-10-26	Loss	(Thailand) Sanghiran Lukbanyai	Lumpinee Stadium	Bangkok, Thailand	Decision	5	3:00
2010-08-04	Loss	(Thailand) Pakorn P.K. Saenchai Muaythaigym	Rajadamnern Stadium	Bangkok, Thailand	Decision	5	3:00
2010-06-06	Win	(Thailand) Suntipap Sit-Au-Ubon	Channel 7 Stadium	Bangkok, Thailand	KO (Elbow)	3	
2009-12	Loss	(Thailand) Wanchalerm Sitzornong	Lumpinee Stadium	Bangkok, Thailand	Decision	5	3:00
For the Channel 7 Stadium 122 lbs title.
2009-10-27	Draw	(Thailand) Penake Sitnumnoi	Lumpinee Stadium	Bangkok, Thailand	Decision	5	3:00
2009-09-18	Win	(Thailand) Wanchalerm Sitzornong	Lumpinee Stadium	Bangkok, Thailand	Decision	5	3:00
2009-08-16	Win	(Thailand) Santipap Santi-Ubon	Channel 7 Stadium	Bangkok, Thailand	Decision	5	3:00
2009-06-21	Win	(Japan) Arashi Fujihara	AJKF Norainu Dengekisakusen 2009	Tokyo, Japan	KO (Right Cross)	3	1:30
2009-04-07	Loss	(Thailand) Penek Sitnumnoi	Lumpinee Stadium	Bangkok, Thailand	Decision	5	3:00
2009-03-17	Loss	(Thailand) Wanchalerm Sitzornong	Lumpinee Stadium	Bangkok, Thailand	Decision	5	3:00
2009-02-19	Draw	(Thailand) Tong Lukmakhamwan	Kiatyongyut, Rajadamnern Stadium	Bangkok, Thailand	Decision	5	3:00
2008-12-07	Win	(Thailand) Petchdam Kiatsoranan	Lumpinee Stadium	Bangkok, Thailand	Decision	5	3:00
2008-04-25	Loss	(Thailand) Karnchai Kor.Bangkui	Rajadamnern Stadium	Bangkok, Thailand	Decision	5	3:00
2008-03-25	Draw	(Thailand) Karnchai Kor.Bangkui	Lumpinee Stadium	Bangkok, Thailand	Decision	5	3:00
2008-02-19	Win	(Thailand) Ninmongkol Kaenorasing	Lumpinee Stadium	Bangkok, Thailand	Decision	5	3:00
2008-01-25	Win	(Thailand) Uranus Phetpayathai	Lumpinee Stadium	Bangkok, Thailand	Decision	5	3:00
2007-11-30	Win	(Thailand) Santipap SitUbon	Lumpinee Stadium	Bangkok, Thailand	Decision	5	3:00
2007-09-07	Loss	(Thailand) Pansak Luk Bor.Kor	Lumpinee Stadium	Bangkok, Thailand	Decision	5	3:00
Loses the Lumpinee Stadium 122 lbs title.
2007-06-26	Loss	(Thailand) Ninmongkol Kaenorasing	Lumpinee Stadium	Bangkok, Thailand	Decision	5	3:00
2007-04-24	Loss	(Thailand) Captainken Narupai	Lumpinee Stadium	Bangkok, Thailand	Decision	5	3:00
2007-03-02	Win	(Thailand) Pokaew Fonjangchonburi	Lumpinee Stadium	Bangkok, Thailand	Decision	5	3:00
Wins the Lumpinee Stadium 122 lbs title.
2006-10-06	Loss	(Thailand) Wuttidet Lukprabat	Eminentair, Lumpinee Stadium	Bangkok, Thailand	Decision	5	3:00
2006-08-29	Win	(Thailand) Pornsanae Sitmonchai	Lumpinee Stadium	Bangkok, Thailand	Decision	5	3:00
2006-08-15	Loss	(Thailand) Sagetdao Petpayathai	Lumpinee Stadium	Bangkok, Thailand	Decision	5	3:00
2006-	Win	(Thailand) Khunsuk Sit Kriangkrai	Lumpinee Stadium	Bangkok, Thailand	Decision	5	3:00
2006-	Loss	(Thailand) Petchmanee Phetsupaphan	Lumpinee Stadium	Bangkok, Thailand	Decision	5	3:00
2006-01-27	Loss	(Thailand) Karnchai Kor.Bangkui	Lumpinee Stadium	Bangkok, Thailand	Decision	5	3:00
Loses the Lumpinee Stadium 118 lbs title.
2005-12-16	Draw	(Thailand) Karnchai Chor.Sangprapai	Lumpinee Stadium	Bangkok, Thailand	Decision	5	3:00
2005-10-24	Loss	(Thailand) Wuttidet Lukprabat		Phetchaburi Province, Thailand	Decision (Split)	5	3:00
For the Omnoi Stadium title.
2005-08-26	Loss	(Thailand) Captainken Narupai	Lumpinee Stadium	Bangkok, Thailand	TKO	2	
2005-05-27	Win	(Thailand) Anantachai Lukbanyai	Lumpinee Stadium	Bangkok, Thailand	Decision	5	3:00
Defends Lumpinee Stadium 118 lbs title.
2004-12-07	Loss	(Thailand) Duangsompong Por.Khumpai	Lumpinee Stadium	Bangkok, Thailand	Decision	5	3:00
For the Lumpinee Stadium 122 lbs title.
2004-11-02	Draw	(Thailand) Wuttidet Lukprabat	Lumpinee Stadium	Bangkok, Thailand	Decision	5	3:00
2004-09-10	Win	(Thailand) Ngathao Attharungroj	Lumpinee Stadium	Bangkok, Thailand	Decision	5	3:00
2004-08-17	Win	(Thailand) Phetek Sitjawai	Lumpinee Stadium	Bangkok, Thailand	Decision	5	3:00
Wins the Lumpinee Stadium 118 lbs title.
2004-07-23	Win	(Thailand) Pornsiri WindySport	Lumpinee Stadium	Bangkok, Thailand	Decision	5	3:00
2004-06-	Win	(Thailand) Captainken Narupai	Lumpinee Stadium	Bangkok, Thailand	Decision	5	3:00
2004-05-	Loss	(Thailand) Panomroonglek Kiatmoo9	Lumpinee Stadium	Bangkok, Thailand	Decision	5	3:00
2004-	Win	(Thailand) Sanchoenglek Jirakriangkrai	Channel 7 Stadium	Bangkok, Thailand	Decision	5	3:00
2004-01-30	Win	(Thailand) Thepbancha Tor.Sunonwipat	Lumpinee Stadium	Bangkok, Thailand	Decision	5	3:00
2003-09-19	Loss	(Thailand) Kaew Fairtex	Petchpiya Fights, Lumpinee Stadium	Bangkok, Thailand	Decision	5	3:00
2003-08-29	Win	(Thailand) Pornsanae Sitmonchai	Lumpinee Stadium	Bangkok, Thailand	Decision	5	3:00
2003-07-04	Win	(Thailand) Pornsanae Sitmonchai	Lumpinee Stadium	Bangkok, Thailand	Decision	5	3:00
2003-05-02	Win	(Thailand) Naruenat ChengsitewGym	Lumpinee Stadium	Bangkok, Thailand	Decision	5	3:00
2003-	Loss	(Thailand) Phetek Kiatyongyut		Ko Samui, Thailand	Decision	5	3:00
2002-07-27	Loss	(Thailand) Pokaew Sit Chafuang	Omnoi Stadium	Samut Sakhon, Thailand	Decision	5	3:00
2002-06-28	Win	(Thailand) Dewid Lukmahanak	Lumpinee Stadium	Bangkok, Thailand	Decision	5	3:00
2002-03-30	Win	(Thailand) Wansongkram Or.Phanatnikhom	Omnoi Stadium - Isuzu Cup Final	Samut Sakhon, Thailand	Decision	5	3:00
Wins the 2002 Isuzu Cup Tournament.
2002-	Win	(Thailand) Roichoeng Sor Ruangsiri	Omnoi Stadium - Isuzu Cup Semi Final	Samut Sakhon, Thailand	Decision	5	3:00
2002-	Win	(Thailand) Yuttajak Kaewsamrit	Omnoi Stadium - Isuzu Cup Quarter Final	Samut Sakhon, Thailand	Decision	5	3:00
2001-	Win	(Thailand) Roichoeng Sor Ruangsiri	Omnoi Stadium - Isuzu Cup	Samut Sakhon, Thailand	Decision	5	3:00
2001-	Win	(Thailand) Khantiphong Tor.Pitakkolkan	Omnoi Stadium - Isuzu Cup	Samut Sakhon, Thailand	Decision	5	3:00
2001-09-22	Win	(Thailand) Ramsainoi Kiatnaphachai	Omnoi Stadium - Isuzu Cup	Samut Sakhon, Thailand	Decision	5	3:00
2001-04-01	Loss	(Thailand) Petchmanee Phetsupaphan	Channel 7 Stadium	Bangkok, Thailand	Decision	5	3:00
2001-03-	Loss	(Thailand) Kangwanlek Petchyindee	Lumpinee Stadium	Bangkok, Thailand	Decision	5	3:00
2001-02-20	Loss	(Thailand) Kangwanlek Petchyindee	Lumpinee Stadium	Bangkok, Thailand	Decision	5	3:00
2001-02-03	Loss	(Thailand) Fahsuchon Sit-O	Lumpinee Stadium	Bangkok, Thailand	Decision	5	3:00
2000-10-21	Win	(Thailand) Sankomsak Phanu	Lumpinee Stadium	Bangkok, Thailand	Decision	5	3:00
2000-09-24	Win	(Thailand) Sakuawut Kiatthawan	Samrong Stadium	Thailand	Decision	5	3:00
2000-06-02	Loss	(Thailand) Yodradap Kiatphayathai	Lumpinee Stadium	Bangkok, Thailand	Decision	5	3:00
2000-03-14	Loss	(Thailand) Sakuawut Kiatthawan	Lumpinee Stadium	Bangkok, Thailand	Decision	5	3:00
1999-08-07	Loss	(Thailand) Chanaphet Naratrikul	Rajadamnern Stadium	Bangkok, Thailand	Decision	5	3:00
1999-06-12	Loss	(Thailand) Rungrit Sitlamuang	Lumpinee Stadium	Bangkok, Thailand	Decision	5	3:00
Legend: Win Loss Draw/No contest Notes
