= Sam-A Gaiyanghadao =

Thai professional Muay Thai fighter and kickboxer

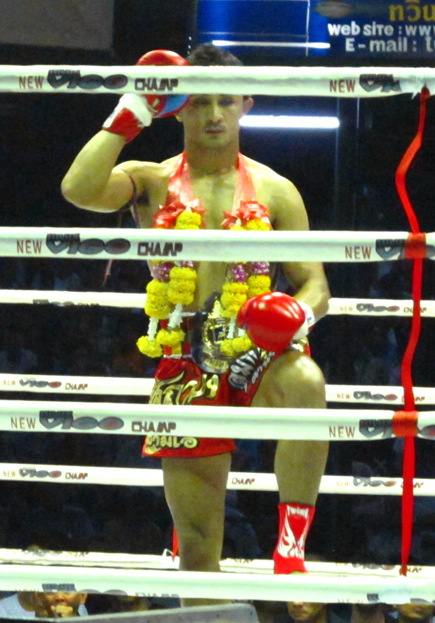
- Born: Wacharit Chuabram; October 13, 1983 (age 43); Buriram, Thailand
- Native name: วัชริศ เชื้อพรหม
- Other names: Sam-A Tor.Rattanakiat (สามเอ ท.รัตนเกียรติ); AAA
- Nickname: Left Hand Wildfire (ซ้ายไฟลามทุ่ง)
- Height: 168 cm (5 ft 6 in)
- Division: Super Flyweight; Super Bantamweight; Strawweight (ONE); Featherweight; Flyweight (ONE)
- Style: Muay Thai (Muay Femur)
- Stance: Southpaw
- Fighting out of: Bangkok, Thailand
- Team: Bangtao Muay Thai & MMA (2023–present); Evolve MMA (2016–2021); Petchyindee Academy (1998–2016, 2021–2023)
- Trainer: Puthai Pinsinchai
- Years active: 1992–2016, 2018–present

Professional boxing record
- Total: 1
- Wins: 1
- By knockout: 1

Kickboxing record
- Total: 438
- Wins: 378
- Losses: 51
- Draws: 9

Other information
- Notable relatives: Superlek Kiatmuu9 (brother-in-law)
- Boxing record from BoxRec

Wacharit Chuabram (Thai: วัชริศ เชื้อพรหม; born October 13, 1983), known professionally as Sam-A Gaiyanghadao (Thai: สามเอ ไก่ย่างห้าดาว), is a Thai professional Muay Thai fighter and kickboxer who currently competes in ONE Championship. He is a former ONE Flyweight Muay Thai World Champion, Inaugural ONE Strawweight Muay Thai World Champion and ONE Inaugural Strawweight Kickboxing World Champion as well as a three-division Lumpinee Stadium champion. He formerly trained and taught at Evolve MMA in Singapore.

Sam-A is known for competing in the first Muay Thai match in ONE Championship. His other Muay Thai accolades include being named Lumpinee Fighter of the Year and Sport Writers Friends Fighter of the Year, winning both awards in 2011. He is regarded as one of the best Muay Thai fighters in the world, known for his strong defense and counter offense.

== Biography ==
=== Early career ===
Sam-a began fighting at age 9 after following the career of his uncle and watching Muay Thai on TV. Within a few years he had already had a couple hundred fights and was fighting nearly every week. At 15 he moved to Bangkok and began training at the Petchyindee Muay Thai academy.

=== Stadium Success ===
By the turn of the century Sam-A was fighting at both Lumpinee boxing stadium and Rajadamnern boxing stadium. He won his first stadium title in 2004 when he beat Petch T. Bangsean for the super flyweight championship of Lumpinee. Soon after he won the Thailand championship at the same weight.

==== 2008 ====
By 2008 he was one of the biggest stars in Muay Thai and was frequently headlining major shows. At the beginning of the year he beat Petchboonchu FA Group for the vacant Thailand bantamweight title, and shortly after beat him again by a stoppage from an accumulation of kicks. Following a loss to Captainkane Narupai, Sam-A would stop top-tier fighters, Jenrop Sakhomsin, Penek Sitnumnoi, and Rungruanglek Lukprabart all in a row. He closed the year out by capturing the Lumpinee championship with a win over Detnarong Wor. Sangprapai.

==== 2009 - 2010 ====
Sam-a continued his great run of fighting in 2009 by starring in a classic rivalry with fan favorite, Pornsanae Sitmonchai. Within a 12-month period the two would go on to fight 5 times, with Sam-A winning 4 of those. His single loss would come in 2010 from a controversial knockdown called late in the fight. In this time, he emerged as a "Yodmuay" (super fighter) and became one of the few fighters in Thailand who were making 100,000 baht per fight. In 2010 he split wins over another rival, Rungruanglek Lukprabart. Towards the end of 2010, he would move up to 126 pounds and challenge top fighter Nong-O Sit Or at Lumpinee Stadium. Soon after, he would stay up in weight and again lose to a bigger fighter, Singtongnoi Por.Telakun. The size difference proved to be too much for Sam-A.

==== 2011 - 2012 ====
In 2011, he came back down to his natural weight and surpassed his 2008 year by going 8-0-1 and winning the Lumpinee Fighter of the Year award. His fight with reigning Fighter of the Year Kongsak Sitboonmee was amongst the biggest and most anticipated of the year. The fight was very close at the end and was ruled a draw. Soon after Sam-A's promoter told him he would buy him a new Toyota pickup truck if he won five straight fights. Sure enough he did, and Sam-A was awarded with a new Toyota pickup valued at over $50,000 after a dominant decision win over Tingtong Chor. Koyahu-Isuzu. In 2011, he changed his name from Sam-A Thor. Ratonakiat to Sam-A Gaiyanghadaogym. Despite having "gym" in the name, it is nothing more than a sponsor, with "Gaiyanghadao" literally meaning "5-star grilled chicken". For his first fight of 2012, he defeated Rungruanglek Lukprapbart by unanimous decision, and in doing so may have finished a long rivalry between the two with a 4–3 record head-to-head. The only other fighter he has fought 7 times was Yodsaenklai Fairtex.

On May 4, Sam-A fought Penake Sitnumnoi at Lumpinee Stadium with the winner expected to receive the prestigious Fighter of the Year award. Penake dropped Sam-A with an elbow in the fourth round and won by unanimous decision. During the fight, Sam-A suffered a thigh injury which caused him to stop training Muay Thai and turn to boxing instead.

===== Professional boxing =====
On July 12, 2012, Sam-A had his first career professional boxing match. He fought Christian Abila and won by 4th-round TKO.

He made his Muay Thai comeback on August 6 and defeated Tong by unanimous decision at Lumpinee Stadium.

He was scheduled to rematch Penake Sitnumnoi on October 4, 2012, at Lumpinee but the fight was postponed when Penake suffered a shoulder injury.

He beat Petpanomrung Wor Sungprapai by decision at Lumpinee Stadium on November 2, 2012.

==== 2013 - 2014 ====
Sam-A rematched Pokaew Fonjaenchonburi on February 7, 2013, and the pair fought to a draw.

He beat Yokwitaya Petsimean on points at Lumpinee Stadium on May 10, 2013.

He TKO'd Phet Utong Or. Kwanmuang in round two at Lumpinee Stadium on June 7, 2013.

Sam-a beat Superlek Wor Sangrapai on points to win the vacant Thailand super bantamweight title at Lumpinee Stadium on July 12, 2013.

On October 21, 2014, Sam-A defeated Andrew Doyle by fourth-round KO to win the WBC World 60 kg Title

==== 2016 ====
On July 29, 2016, Sam-A fought Japanese kickboxer, Yuya Kono in Japan. He stopped Kono in the third round with an elbow knockout.

Sam-A retired from fighting following the fight and moved to Singapore where he joined Evolve MMA as a Muay Thai instructor.

=== ONE Championship ===
Sam-A signed with ONE Championship when the promotion unveiled their new all-striking format: the ONE Super Series.

==== 2018 ====
On January 26, 2018, he faced Joseph Lasiri at ONE Championship: Global Superheroes in the promotion's first-ever Muay Thai contest, defeating the Italian via second-round TKO.

He followed that up with a KO victory over Sergio Wielzen on May 18, 2018, to claim ONE's inaugural ONE Super Series Flyweight Muay Thai World Championship at ONE Championship: Unstoppable Dreams.

==== 2019 ====
In his first title defense on May 4, 2019, he lost the title in upset fashion to England's Jonathan Haggerty by unanimous decision at ONE Championship: For Honor.

Following his title loss, Sam-A Gaiyanghadao moved down to strawweight and eventually made his return to ONE Championship on October 13, 2019, at Tokyo. He faced Darren Rolland in Part 1 of ONE Championship: Century, where he knocked out the Frenchman in the second round.

Sam-A Gaiyanghadao then faced Wang Junguang for the inaugural ONE Strawweight Kickboxing World Championship at ONE Championship: Mark Of Greatness on December 6, 2019. Sam-A defeated Wang Junguang by unanimous decision to become the first ONE Kickboxing Strawweight World Champion, as well as the second two-sport World Champion in ONE Championship.

==== 2020 ====
Next, Sam-A was looking to win a second title as he faced Rocky Ogden for the inaugural ONE Strawweight Muay Thai World Championship at ONE Championship: King of the Jungle on February 28, 2020. After dominating the entire fight, Sam-A would go on to win by unanimous decision and become the first ONE Muay Thai Strawweight World Champion, becoming ONE Championship's second two-sport world champion in the process.

Sam-A was then scheduled to make his first defense of the ONE Strawweight Muay Thai World Championship against Josh Tonna, who was coming off a two straight wins. The two faced at ONE Championship: Reign of Dynasties on October 9, 2020. Coming into the fight as a huge favorite, Sam-A defeated Tonna via second-round TKO after delivering three knockdowns to retain the title.

==== 2021 ====
Sam-A made his second defense of the ONE Muay Thai Strawweight Championship against fellow countryman and ONE promotional newcomer Prajanchai P.K.Saenchaimuaythaigym at ONE Championship: Battleground on July 30, 2021. After five hard-fought rounds, he ultimately lost the title by majority decision.

==== 2022 ====
In February 2022, it was reported that Sam-A had retired from international competition after returning to Thailand from Singapore, where he had coached at Evolve MMA. On February 10, 2023, Nuttadaj Vachirarattanawong promoter of Petchyindee Academy announced Sam-A has not retired due to arm injury and want to return to Thailand for treatment, but the ONE team fired them back and released the news that Sam-A had retired. Chitinat Asadamongkol, president of ONE Championship Thailand, stating that organization has never released news that Sam-A will retired and Sam-A himself is still in the contract, but who went back to fight with Petchyindee battle earlier, because Nuttadaj contacted him to negotiate and there is a discussion which organization allows, with matters of this nature having to be discussed on a case-by-case basis.

==== 2023 ====
After won Tongnoi Lukbanyai and Samingdam Chor.Ajalaboon at Petchyindee in Rajadamnern Stadium, Sam-A faced Ryan Sheehan on March 17, 2023, at ONE Friday Fights 9. He won the fight via knockout in the second round.

Sam-A faced Prajanchai P.K.Saenchai in a rematch at ONE Friday Fights 22 on June 23, 2023, for the interim ONE Muay Thai Strawweight Championship. He was knocked out with a right elbow in the second round.

==== 2024 ====
Sam-A faced Akram Hamidi on September 27, 2024, at ONE Friday Fights 81. He won the fight via knockout in the first round and this win earned a $10,000 Performance of the Night bonus.

Sam-A faced Zhang Peimian in a kickboxing bout on November 9, 2024, at ONE 169. He won the fight via unanimous decision.

==== 2025 ====
Sam-A faced Jonathan Di Bella for the interim ONE Strawweight Kickboxing World Championship on March 23, 2025, at ONE 172. He lost the fight via unanimous decision.

== Personal life ==
Sam-A and his wife have two daughters and they live in Buriram, Thailand.

== Titles and accomplishments ==
=== Muay Thai ===
- Lumpinee Stadium
  - 2004 Lumpinee Stadium Super Flyweight (115 lbs) Champion
  - 2007 Lumpinee Stadium Super Flyweight (115 lbs) Champion
    - Two successful title defenses
  - 2008 Lumpinee Stadium Super Bantamweight (122 lbs) Champion
    - Four successful title defenses
  - 2011 Lumpinee Stadium Fighter of the Year
  - 2013 Lumpinee Stadium Best Wai Kru
- Professional Boxing Association of Thailand (PAT)
  - 2004 Thailand Super Flyweight (115 lbs) Champion
  - 2006 Thailand Bantamweight (118 lbs) Champion
  - 2009 Thailand Super Bantamweight (122 lbs) Champion
    - Three successful title defenses
  - 2014 Thailand Featherweight (126 lbs) Champion
- WBC Muaythai
  - 2014 WBC MuayThai International Super Featherweight (130 lbs) Champion
- Toyota Marathon Muay Thai
  - 2015 Toyota Marathon Featherweight (126 lbs) Tournament Champion
- Sports Authority of Thailand
  - 2011 Sports Authority of Thailand Fighter of the Year
- ONE Championship
  - ONE Flyweight Muay Thai World Championship (One time; inaugural)
  - ONE Strawweight Muay Thai World Championship (One time; inaugural)
    - One successful title defence
  - Performance of the Night (Two times) vs. Ryan Sheehan and Akram Hamidi
- Petchyindee True4U
  - 2022 True4U Featherweight (57 kg / 126 lb) Champion.

=== Kickboxing ===
- ONE Championship
  - ONE Strawweight Kickboxing World Championship (One time)

== Fight record ==
Professional Muay Thai Record
378 Wins, 51 Losses, 9 Draws
| Date | Result | Opponent | Event | Location | Method | Round | Time |
| 2026-07-24 | Loss | (Malaysia) Aliff Sor.Dechapan | ONE: The Inner Circle 23, Lumpinee Stadium | Bangkok, Thailand | KO (head kick and punches) | 5 | 1:09 |
For the interim ONE Strawweight Muay Thai World Championship.
| 2026-04-11 | Win | (Morocco) Elmehdi El Jamari | ONE Fight Night 42 | Bangkok, Thailand | KO (head kick) | 2 | 2:43 |
| 2025-12-19 | Win | (Thailand) Jaosuayai Mor. Krungthepthonburi | ONE Friday Fights 137, Lumpinee Stadium | Bangkok, Thailand | Decision (Unanimous) | 3 | 3:00 |
| 2025-09-26 | Win | (Myanmar) Thway Lin Htet | ONE Friday Fights 126, Lumpinee Stadium | Bangkok, Thailand | Decision (Unanimous) | 3 | 3:00 |
| 2025-03-23 | Loss | (Italy) Jonathan Di Bella | ONE 172 | Saitama, Japan | Decision (unanimous) | 5 | 3:00 |
For the interim ONE Strawweight Kickboxing World Championship.
| 2024-11-09 | Win | (China) Zhang Peimian | ONE 169 | Bangkok, Thailand | Decision (unanimous) | 3 | 3:00 |
| 2024-09-27 | Win | (Algeria) Akram Hamidi | ONE Friday Fights 81, Lumpinee Stadium | Bangkok, Thailand | KO (Left cross) | 1 | 1:22 |
| 2023-06-23 | Loss | (Thailand) Prajanchai P.K.Saenchaimuaythaigym | ONE Friday Fights 22, Lumpinee Stadium | Bangkok, Thailand | KO (Right elbow) | 2 | 2:10 |
For the Interim ONE Strawweight Muay Thai World title.
| 2023-03-17 | Win | (Republic of Ireland) Ryan Sheehan | ONE Friday Fights 9 | Bangkok, Thailand | KO (Left cross) | 2 | 2:52 |
| 2022-10-20 | Win | (Thailand) Samingdam Chor.Ajalaboon | Petchyindee, Rajadamnern Stadium | Bangkok, Thailand | Decision | 5 | 3:00 |
| 2022-05-12 | Win | (Thailand) Tongnoi Lukbanyai | Petchyindee, Rajadamnern Stadium | Bangkok, Thailand | Decision | 5 | 3:00 |
Wins the True4U Featherweight (126 lbs) title.
| 2021-07-30 | Loss | (Thailand) Prajanchai P.K.Saenchaimuaythaigym | ONE Championship: Battleground | Kallang, Singapore | Decision (Majority) | 5 | 3:00 |
Loses the ONE Strawweight Muay Thai title.
| 2020-10-09 | Win | (Australia) Josh Tonna | ONE Championship: Reign of Dynasties | Kallang, Singapore | TKO (3 Knockdowns) | 2 | 2:30 |
Defends the ONE Strawweight Muay Thai title.
| 2020-02-28 | Win | (Australia) Rocky Ogden | ONE Championship: King of the Jungle | Kallang, Singapore | Decision (Unanimous) | 5 | 3:00 |
Wins the Inaugural ONE Strawweight Muay Thai title.
| 2019-12-06 | Win | (China) Wang Junguang | ONE Championship: Mark Of Greatness | Kuala Lumpur, Malaysia | Decision (Unanimous) | 5 | 3:00 |
Wins the ONE Inaugural Strawweight Kickboxing title.
| 2019-10-13 | Win | (France) Darren Rolland | ONE Championship: Century Part 1 | Tokyo, Japan | KO (Left Hook) | 2 | 1:20 |
| 2019-05-03 | Loss | (England) Jonathan Haggerty | ONE Championship: For Honor | Jakarta, Indonesia | Decision | 5 | 3:00 |
Loses the ONE Flyweight Muay Thai title.
| 2018-05-18 | Win | (Suriname) Sergio Wielzen | ONE Championship: Unstoppable Dreams | Kallang, Singapore | KO (Right Elbow) | 4 | |
Wins the ONE Flyweight Muay Thai title.
| 2018-01-26 | Win | (Italy) Joseph Lasiri | ONE Championship: Global Superheroes | Manila, Philippines | KO (Straight Left) | 2 | |
| 2016-07-29 | Win | (Japan) Yuya Kono | Toyota Marathon | Japan | KO (elbow) | 3 | |
| 2015-12-25 | Win | (Thailand) Petsongkom Sitjaroentab | Toyota Marathon, Final | Bangkok, Thailand | Decision | 3 | 3:00 |
Wins the Toyota Marathon Featherweight (126 lbs) Tournament title.
| 2015-12-25 | Win | (Thailand) Palangtip Sripeung | Toyota Marathon, Semi Finals | Bangkok, Thailand | Decision | 3 | 3:00 |
| 2015-10-07 | Loss | (Thailand) Bangpleenoi 96Penang | Rajadamnern Stadium | Bangkok, Thailand | Decision | 5 | 3:00 |
| 2015-09-15 | Win | (Thailand) Klasuk Petjinda | Lumpinee Stadium | Bangkok, Thailand | Decision | 5 | 3:00 |
| 2015-08-14 | Win | (Thailand) Petsongkom Sitjaroentab | Toyota Marathon, Final | Thailand | Decision | 3 | 3:00 |
| 2015-08-14 | Win | (Thailand) Thomas Chaicharoen | Toyota Marathon, Semi-final | Thailand | Decision | 3 | 3:00 |
| 2015-08-14 | Win | (Spain) Andres Arturo | Toyota Marathon, Quarter-final | Thailand | TKO (low kicks) | 3 | |
| 2015-04-29 | Loss | (Thailand) Panpayak Jitmuangnon | Rajadamnern Stadium | Bangkok, Thailand | KO(Left high kick) | 1 | 1:20 |
| 2015-03-06 | Loss | (Thailand) Panpayak Jitmuangnon | Lumpinee Stadium | Bangkok, Thailand | Decision | 5 | 3:00 |
For the vacant Lumpinee Stadium Featherweight (126 lbs) title.
| 2015-01-26 | Win | (Thailand) Detchsakda Sitsongpeenong | Rajadamnern Stadium | Bangkok, Thailand | TKO (low kicks) | 4 | |
| 2014-12-20 | Win | (Ukraine) Trishin Constantine | Topking World Series | Hong Kong | Decision | 3 | |
| 2014-11-25 | Win | (Thailand) Bangpleenoi 96Penang | Lumpinee Stadium | Bangkok, Thailand | KO | 3 | |
Wins the Thailand Featherweight (126 lbs) title.
| 2014-10-21 | Win | (Republic of Ireland) Andrew Doyle | Universal Chinese Martial Arts Association Event | Hong Kong | KO | 4 | |
Wins the WBC MuayThai International Super Featherweight (130 lbs) title.
| 2014-08-14 | Loss | (Thailand) Thaksinlek Kiatniwat | Rajadamnern Stadium | Bangkok, Thailand | KO (head kick) | 2 | |
| 2014-07-15 | Win | (Thailand) ET Por Tor Tortawee | Lumpinee Stadium | Bangkok, Thailand | KO | 4 | |
| 2014-06-11 | Loss | (Thailand) Pettawee Sor Kittichai | Rajadamnern Stadium | Bangkok, Thailand | KO (head kick) | 3 | |
| 2014-05-17 | Win | (France) Ayoub el Khaidar | Impacts Fight Night 4 | Bordeaux, France | KO (head kick) | 4 | |
| 2014-03-30 | Win | (Thailand) Sangmanee Sor Tienpo | Charity Event for School | Songkhla, southern Thailand | Decision | 5 | 3:00 |
| 2014-02-28 | Loss | (Thailand) Superbank Sakchaichode | Lumpinee 4Man Tournament | Bangkok, Thailand | Decision | 3 | 3:00 |
| 2014-02-08 | Win | (France) Hakim Hamech | La Nuit Des Titans | Tours, France | KO (elbow) | 4 | |
| 2014-01-07 | Win | (Thailand) Nongbeer Chokngamwong | Lumpinee Stadium | Bangkok, Thailand | Decision | 5 | 3:00 |
| 2013-12-03 | Loss | (Thailand) Superbank Sakchaichode | Lumpinee Stadium | Bangkok, Thailand | Decision | 5 | 3:00 |
For the Lumpinee Stadium Featherweight (126 lbs) title.
| 2013-10-31 | Win | (Republic of Ireland) Stephen Meleady | Toyota marathon | Thailand | Decision | 3 | 3:00 |
| 2013-10-11 | Win | (Thailand) Kwankhao Mor.Ratanabandit | Lumpinee Stadium | Bangkok, Thailand | Decision | 5 | 3:00 |
| 2013-09-04 | Win | (Thailand) Superlek Kiatmuu9 | Rajadamnern Stadium | Bangkok, Thailand | Decision | 5 | 3:00 |
| 2013-07-12 | Win | (Thailand) Superlek Kiatmuu9 | Lumpinee Stadium | Bangkok, Thailand | Decision | 5 | 3:00 |
Wins the Thailand Super Bantamweight (122 lbs) title.
| 2013-06-07 | Win | (Thailand) Phet Utong Or. Kwanmuang | Lumpinee Stadium | Bangkok, Thailand | TKO (Low kick) | 2 | |
| 2013-05-10 | Win | (Thailand) Yokwitaya Petsimean | Lumpinee Stadium | Bangkok, Thailand | Decision | 5 | 3:00 |
| 2013-04-09 | Win | (Thailand) Phet Utong Or. Kwanmuang | Lumpinee Stadium | Bangkok, Thailand | Decision | 5 | 3:00 |
| 2013-02-07 | Draw | (Thailand) Pokaew Fonjangchonburi | Rajadamnern Stadium | Bangkok, Thailand | Decision draw | 5 | 3:00 |
| 2013-01-04 | Loss | (Thailand) Petpanomrung Kiatmuu9 | Lumpinee Stadium | Bangkok, Thailand | Decision | 5 | 3:00 |
| 2012-12-07 | Win | (Thailand) Pokaew Fonjangchonburi | Lumpinee Stadium | Bangkok, Thailand | Decision | 5 | 3:00 |
Defends the Thailand Super Bantamweight (122 lbs) title.
| 2012-11-02 | Win | (Thailand) Petpanomrung Kiatmuu9 | Petchyindee Fight, Lumpinee Stadium | Bangkok, Thailand | Decision | 5 | 3:00 |
| 2012-08-07 | Win | (Thailand) Thong Puideenaidee | Lumpinee Stadium | Bangkok, Thailand | Decision | 5 | 3:00 |
| 2012-05-04 | Loss | (Thailand) Penake Sitnumnoi | Lumpinee Stadium | Bangkok, Thailand | Decision | 5 | 3:00 |
For the Thailand and Lumpinee Stadium Featherweight (126 lbs) titles.
| 2012-03-02 | Win | (Thailand) Petpanomrung Kiatmuu9 | Lumpinee Stadium | Bangkok, Thailand | Decision | 5 | 3:00 |
| 2012-01-12 | Win | (Thailand) Rungruanglek Lukprabat | Rajadamnern Stadium | Bangkok, Thailand | Decision | 5 | 3:00 |
| 2011-12-09 | Win | (Thailand) Ritidej Wor. Wanthavee | Lumpinee Stadium | Bangkok, Thailand | TKO (Low kicks) | 4 | |
| 2011-10-07 | Win | (Thailand) Tingtong Chor. Koyahu-Isuzu | Lumpinee Stadium | Bangkok, Thailand | Decision | 5 | 3:00 |
| 2011-08-30 | Win | (Thailand) Rungruanglek Lukprabat | Lumpinee Stadium | Bangkok, Thailand | Decision | 5 | 3:00 |
| 2011-08-02 | Win | (Thailand) Lekkla Thanasuranakorn | Lumpinee Stadium | Bangkok, Thailand | Decision | 5 | 3:00 |
| 2011-07-07 | Win | (Thailand) Tingtong Chor. Koyahu-Isuzu | Rajadamnern Stadium | Bangkok, Thailand | Decision | 5 | 3:00 |
| 2011-06-10 | Win | (Thailand) Thong Puideenaidee | Lumpinee Stadium | Bangkok, Thailand | Decision | 5 | 3:00 |
Defends the Lumpinee Stadium Super Bantamweight (122 lbs) title.
| 2011-05-10 | Draw | (Thailand) Kongsak Saenchaimuaythaigym | Lumpinee Stadium | Bangkok, Thailand | Decision | 5 | 3:00 |
| 2011-03-08 | Win | (Thailand) Pokaew Fonjangchonburi | Lumpinee Stadium | Bangkok, Thailand | Decision | 5 | 3:00 |
| 2011-02-05 | Win | (Thailand) Manasak Pinsinchai | Siam Omnoi | Bangkok, Thailand | Decision | 5 | 3:00 |
| 2010-12-29 | Loss | (Thailand) Rungruanglek Lukprabat | Rajadamnern Stadium | Bangkok, Thailand | Decision | 5 | 3:00 |
| 2010-12-07 | Win | (Thailand) Thong Puideenaidee | Lumpinee Stadium | Bangkok, Thailand | Decision | 5 | 3:00 |
Defends the Lumpinee Stadium Super Bantamweight (122 lbs) title.
| 2010-11-02 | Loss | (Thailand) Singtongnoi Por.Telakun | Lumpinee Stadium | Bangkok, Thailand | Decision | 5 | 3:00 |
| 2010-10-05 | Win | (Thailand) Rungruanglek Lukprabat | Lumpinee Stadium | Bangkok, Thailand | Decision | 5 | 3:00 |
Defends the Thailand Super Bantamweight (122 lbs) title.
| 2010-09-07 | Loss | (Thailand) Nong-O Sit Or | Lumpinee Stadium | Bangkok, Thailand | Decision | 5 | 3:00 |
| 2010-07-13 | Win | (Thailand) Trijak Sitjomtrai | Lumpinee Stadium | Bangkok, Thailand | Decision | 5 | 3:00 |
| 2010-06-04 | Win | (Thailand) Rungpet Wor. Sangprapai | Lumpinee Stadium | Bangkok, Thailand | Decision | 5 | 3:00 |
| 2010-05-07 | Win | (Thailand) Pakorn PKSaenchaimuaythaigym | Lumpinee Stadium | Bangkok, Thailand | Decision | 5 | 3:00 |
| 2010-03-05 | Win | (Thailand) Pettawee Sor Kittichai | Lumpinee Stadium | Bangkok, Thailand | Decision | 5 | 3:00 |
| 2010-02-10 | Loss | (Thailand) Pornsanae Sitmonchai | Rajadamnern Stadium | Bangkok, Thailand | Decision | 5 | 3:00 |
| 2010-01-15 | Win | (Thailand) Traijak Sitjomtrai | Lumpinee Stadium | Bangkok, Thailand | Decision | 5 | 3:00 |
| 2009-12-08 | Win | (Thailand) Lekkla Thanasuranakorn | Lumpinee Stadium | Bangkok, Thailand | Decision | 5 | 3:00 |
Defends the Lumpinee Stadium Super Bantamweight (122 lbs) title.
| 2009-11-13 | Loss | (Thailand) Rungruanglek Lukprabat | Lumpinee Stadium | Bangkok, Thailand | Decision | 5 | 3:00 |
| 2009-09-25 | Win | (Thailand) Pornsanae Sitmonchai | Lumpinee Stadium | Bangkok, Thailand | Decision | 5 | 3:00 |
| 2009-09-04 | Win | (Thailand) Wuttidet Lukprabat | Lumpinee Stadium | Bangkok, Thailand | Decision | 5 | 3:00 |
Wins the Thailand Super Bantamweight (122 lbs) title.
| 2009-08-06 | Loss | (Thailand) Pettawee Sor Kittichai | Rajadamnern Stadium | Bangkok, Thailand | Decision | 5 | 3:00 |
| 2009-07-03 | Win | (Thailand) Pakorn PKSaenchaimuaythaigym | Lumpinee Stadium | Bangkok, Thailand | Decision | 5 | 3:00 |
| 2009-05-26 | Win | (Thailand) Pornsanae Sitmonchai | Lumpinee Stadium | Bangkok, Thailand | Decision | 5 | 3:00 |
| 2009-03-03 | Loss | (Thailand) Rungruanglek Lukprabat | Lumpinee Stadium | Bangkok, Thailand | Decision | 5 | 3:00 |
| 2009-02-06 | Win | (Thailand) Pornsanae Sitmonchai | Lumpinee Stadium | Bangkok, Thailand | Decision | 5 | 3:00 |
Defends the Lumpinee Stadium Super Bantamweight (122 lbs) title.
| 2009-01-06 | Win | (Thailand) Pornsanae Sitmonchai | Lumpinee Stadium | Bangkok, Thailand | Decision | 5 | 3:00 |
| 2008-12-09 | Win | (Thailand) Karnchai Fairtex | Lumpinee Stadium | Bangkok, Thailand | Decision | 5 | 3:00 |
| 2008-10-31 | Win | (Thailand) Detnarong Wor. Sangprapai | Lumpinee Stadium | Bangkok, Thailand | Decision | 5 | 3:00 |
Wins the Lumpinee Stadium Super Bantamweight (122 lbs) title.
| 2008-09-30 | Loss | (Thailand) Karnchai Fairtex | Lumpinee Stadium | Bangkok, Thailand | Decision | 5 | 3:00 |
| 2008-09-04 | Win | (Thailand) Rungruanglek Lukprabat | Rajadamnern Stadium | Bangkok, Thailand | KO | 4 | |
| 2008-08-08 | Win | (Thailand) Penake Sitnumnoi | Lumpinee Stadium | Bangkok, Thailand | KO (Elbow) | 4 | |
| 2008-06-04 | Win | (Thailand) Jenrop Sakhomsin | Lumpinee Stadium | Bangkok, Thailand | TKO (Low Kick) | 4 | |
| 2008-03-25 | Loss | (Thailand) Captainken Narupai | Lumpinee Stadium | Bangkok, Thailand | Decision | 5 | 3:00 |
For the vacant Thailand Super Bantamweight (122 lbs) title.
| 2008-02-29 | Win | (Thailand) Petchboonchu FA Group | Lumpinee Stadium | Bangkok, Thailand | TKO (Low kicks) | 4 | |
| 2008-02-05 | Loss | (Thailand) Wuttidet Lukprabat | Lumpinee Stadium | Bangkok, Thailand | Decision | 5 | 3:00 |
| 2008-01-04 | Win | (Thailand) Petchboonchu FA Group | Lumpinee Stadium | Bangkok, Thailand | Decision | 5 | 3:00 |
| 2007-12-07 | Win | (Thailand) Chatchai Sor.Thonayong | Lumpinee Stadium | Bangkok, Thailand | Decision | 5 | 3:00 |
Defends the Lumpinee Stadium Super Flyweight (115 lbs) title.
| 2007-07-06 | Win | (Thailand) Rakkiat Kiatprapat | Lumpinee Stadium | Bangkok, Thailand | Decision | 5 | 3:00 |
| 2007-06-08 | Win | (Thailand) Kampichit Riflownasoundna | Lumpinee Stadium | Bangkok, Thailand | Decision | 5 | 3:00 |
Defends the Lumpinee Stadium Super Flyweight (115 lbs) title.
| 2007-05-04 | Loss | (Thailand) Detnarong Wor.Sangprapai | Lumpinee Stadium | Bangkok, Thailand | Decision | 5 | 3:00 |
| 2007-03-02 | Win | (Thailand) Detnarong Wor.Sangprapai | Lumpinee Stadium | Bangkok, Thailand | Decision | 5 | 3:00 |
Wins the Lumpinee Stadium Super Flyweight (115 lbs) title.
| 2007-01-30 | Win | (Thailand) Songkom Wor. Sangprapai | Lumpinee Stadium | Bangkok, Thailand | Decision | 5 | 3:00 |
| 2007-01-05 | Win | (Thailand) Deathsuriya Sitthiprasert | Lumpinee Stadium | Bangkok, Thailand | TKO | 3 | |
| 2006-11-24 | Win | (Thailand) Kampichit Riflownasoundna | Lumpinee Stadium | Bangkok, Thailand | Decision | 5 | 3:00 |
| 2006-10-24 | Loss | (Thailand) Manasak Narupai | Lumpinee Stadium | Bangkok, Thailand | Decision | 5 | 3:00 |
| 2006-10-03 | Draw | (Thailand) Kampichit Riflownasoundna | Lumpinee Stadium | Bangkok, Thailand | Decision | 5 | 3:00 |
| 2006-08-11 | Draw | (Thailand) Phaysaer Gardensviewgym | Lumpinee Stadium | Bangkok, Thailand | Decision | 5 | 3:00 |
| 2006-06-20 | Win | (Thailand) Kompayak Fairtex | Lumpinee Stadium | Bangkok, Thailand | Decision | 5 | 3:00 |
| 2006-05-16 | Win | (Thailand) Duangpichit Or.Siripon | Lumpinee Stadium | Bangkok, Thailand | Decision | 5 | 3:00 |
Wins the Thailand Super Flyweight (115 lbs) title.
| 2006-04-21 | Draw | (Thailand) Kompayak Fairtex | Lumpinee Stadium | Bangkok, Thailand | Decision | 5 | 3:00 |
| 2006-03-14 | Win | (Thailand) Yodthongchai Sor. Suwatchai | Lumpinee Stadium | Bangkok, Thailand | TKO | 3 | |
| 2006-02-14 | Win | (Thailand) Daoprasak Keatkamtorn | Lumpinee Stadium | Bangkok, Thailand | Decision | 5 | 3:00 |
| 2006-01-24 | Loss | (Thailand) Rungruanglek Lukprabat | Phetpiya, Lumpinee Stadium | Bangkok, Thailand | Decision | 5 | 3:00 |
| 2005-12-06 | Win | (Thailand) Kangwanlek Petyindee | Lumpinee Stadium | Bangkok, Thailand | Decision | 5 | 3:00 |
| 2005-11-03 | Win | (Thailand) Chaiyo Soonkilabannon | Rajadamnern Stadium | Bangkok, Thailand | Decision | 5 | 3:00 |
| 2005-08-12 | Win | (Thailand) Nuttapon Kor. Kumpai | Lumpinee Stadium | Bangkok, Thailand | Decision | 5 | 3:00 |
| 2005-05-24 | Win | (Thailand) Kangwanlek Petyindee | Lumpinee Stadium | Bangkok, Thailand | Decision | 5 | 3:00 |
| 2005-03-29 | Loss | (Thailand) Songkom Wor.Sangprapai | Lumpinee Stadium | Bangkok, Thailand | TKO | 4 | |
Loses the Lumpinee Stadium Super Flyweight (115 lbs) title.
| 2005-03-04 | Loss | (Thailand) Kangwanlek Petyindee | Lumpinee Stadium | Bangkok, Thailand | Decision | 5 | 3:00 |
| 2005-02-01 | Loss | (Thailand) Pettawee Sor Kittichai | Lumpinee Stadium | Bangkok, Thailand | Decision | 5 | 3:00 |
| 2004-12-07 | Win | (Thailand) Petch Tor.Baengsean | Lumpinee Stadium | Bangkok, Thailand | Decision | 5 | 3:00 |
Wins the vacant Lumpinee Stadium Super Flyweight (115 lbs) title.
| 2004-11-05 | Win | (Thailand) Sakmongkon Lukprabart | Lumpinee Stadium | Bangkok, Thailand | TKO | 3 | |
| 2004-10-09 | Loss | (Thailand) Petch Tor.Bangsean | Lumpinee Stadium | Bangkok, Thailand | Decision | 5 | 3:00 |
| 2004-07-20 | Win | (Thailand) Chalermdet Sor.Tawanrung | Petchyindee, Lumpinee Stadium | Bangkok, Thailand | Decision | 5 | 3:00 |
| 2004-06-22 | Loss | (Thailand) Kaew Fairtex | Lumpinee Stadium | Bangkok, Thailand | Decision | 5 | 3:00 |
| 2004-05-28 | Win | (Thailand) Petch Tor.Bangsaen | Lumpinee Stadium | Bangkok, Thailand | Decision | 5 | 3:00 |
| 2004-04-21 | Loss | (Thailand) Wuttidet Lukprabat | Rajadamnern Stadium | Bangkok, Thailand | Decision | 5 | 3:00 |
| 2004-03-30 | Win | (Thailand) Petch Por. Purapa | Lumpinee Stadium | Bangkok, Thailand | Decision | 5 | 3:00 |
| 2004-02-24 | Win | (Thailand) Duangsompong Por.Kumpai | Lumpinee Stadium | Bangkok, Thailand | Decision | 5 | 3:00 |
| 2004-01-27 | Win | (Thailand) Chatchainoi Sitbenjama | Lumpinee Stadium | Bangkok, Thailand | TKO | 5 | |
| 2003-12-09 | Loss | (Thailand) Daoprasuk Sitpafar | Lumpinee Stadium | Bangkok, Thailand | Decision | 5 | 3:00 |
| 2003-11-14 | Win | (Thailand) Phongsing Kiatchansing | Lumpinee Stadium | Bangkok, Thailand | Decision | 5 | 3:00 |
| 2003-10-10 | Win | (Thailand) Patiharn Sor. Kittichai | Lumpinee Stadium | Bangkok, Thailand | Decision | 5 | 3:00 |
| 2003-09-16 | Win | (Thailand) Kangwanlek Petyindee | Lumpinee Stadium | Bangkok, Thailand | Decision | 5 | 3:00 |
| 2003-08-22 | Win | (Thailand) Sungyut Wor. Suntannon | Lumpinee Stadium | Bangkok, Thailand | Decision | 5 | 3:00 |
| 2003-07-29 | Win | (Thailand) Daoprasuk Sitpafar | Lumpinee Stadium | Bangkok, Thailand | Decision | 5 | 3:00 |
| 2003-06-10 | Loss | (Thailand) Sungyut Wor. Suntannon | Lumpinee Stadium | Bangkok, Thailand | Decision | 5 | 3:00 |
| | Win | (Thailand) Tingtong Saengsawangpanrapla | | Bangkok, Thailand | Decision | 5 | 3:00 |
| | Win | (Thailand) Sarawut Lukbanyai | Lumpinee Stadium | Bangkok, Thailand | Decision | 5 | 3:00 |
| 2001-12-29 | Win | (Thailand) Yai Sitsamuchai | Lumpinee Stadium | Bangkok, Thailand | Decision | 5 | 3:00 |
| 1999 | Loss | (Thailand) Yodsaenklai Petchyindee | Lumpinee Stadium | Bangkok, Thailand | Decision | 5 | 3:00 |
For the vacant Lumpinee Stadium Mini Flyweight (105 lbs) title.
Legend: Win Loss Draw/No contest Notes

== Professional boxing record ==
Professional Boxing Record
1 Wins, 0 Losses, 0 Draws
| Date | Result | Opponent | Event | Location | Method | Round | Time |
| 2012-07-12 | Win | (Philippines) Christian Abila | | Sara Buri, Thailand | TKO | 4 | |
Legend: Win Loss Draw/No contest Notes
