= Pettawee Sor Kittichai =

Thai Muay Thai fighter

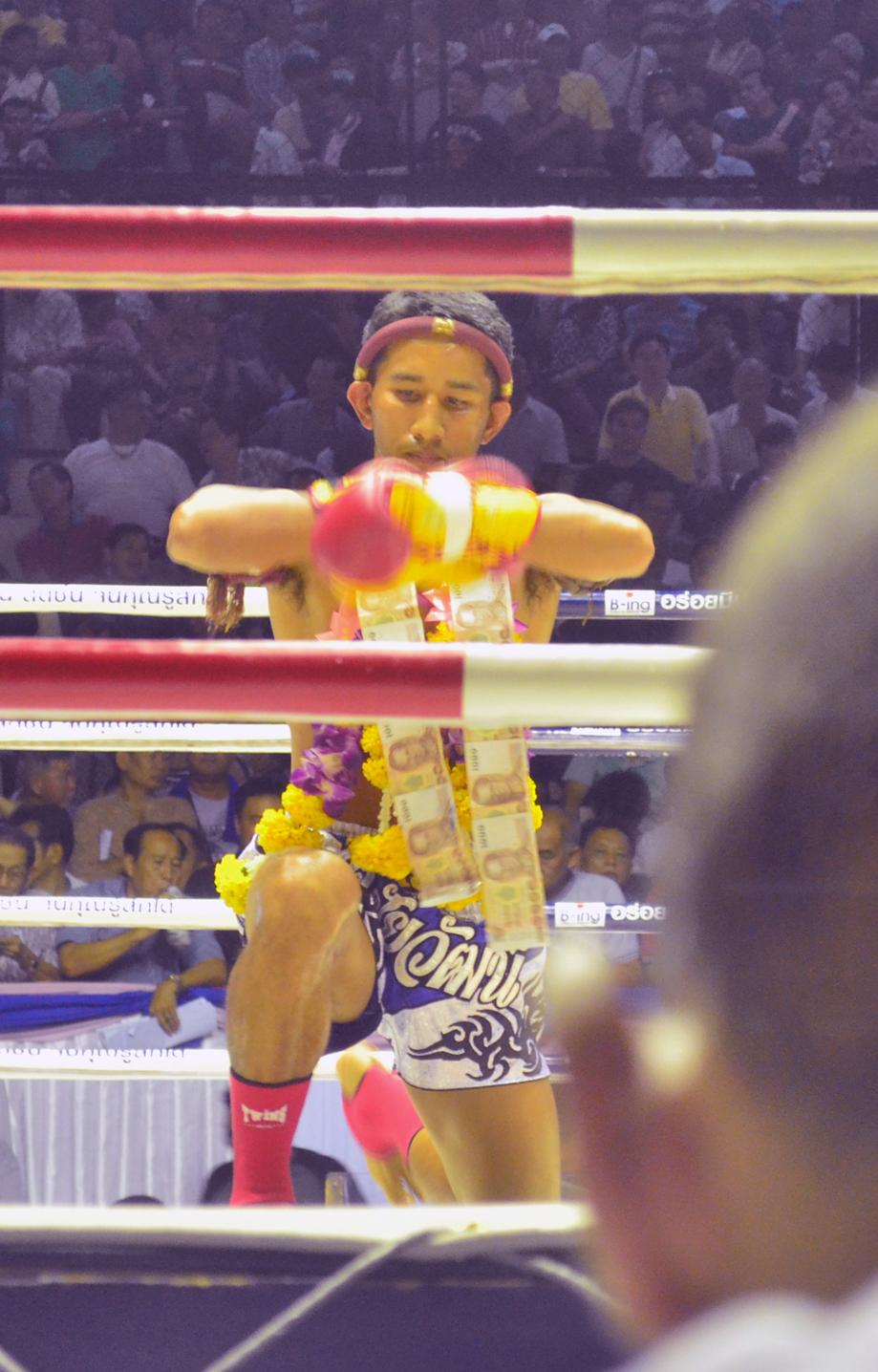
- Born: Pongthanawat Chuekham; March 31, 1987 (age 39); Songkhla, Thailand
- Other names: Phetawee Jaowsamut Muaythai
- Height: 170 cm (5 ft 7 in)
- Weight: 59 kg (130 lb; 9.3 st)
- Style: Muay Thai
- Stance: Orthodox
- Fighting out of: Thung Song, Thailand
- Team: Sor.Kittichai

Other information
- Occupation: Muay Thai trainer
- Spouse: Brenna Marriott

Pettawee Sor.Kittichai (Thai: เพชรทวี ส.กิตติชัย) is a Thai Muay Thai fighter.

== Biography and career ==
Pettawee was introduced to Muay Thai training by his uncle at the a of 5 years old along his brothers. After a few months of training he had his first fights for the Sor Kittichai camp in Thung Song. During his stadium career he defeated notable champions such as Sam-A Gaiyanghadao, Singtongnoi Por.Telakun, Pakorn Sakyothin or Wuttidet Lukprabat. He also captured the Thailand title at 122 lbs.

On December 24, 2012, Pettawee faced Saeksan Or. Kwanmuang at the Rajadamnern Stadium Anniversary show. The fight was judged a draw.

In April 2013 Pettawee was scheduled to face Thanonchai Topr.Sangtiennoi. He lost the fight by knockout in the third round.

On July 16, 2013, Pettawee faced Pokaew Fonjangchonburi at Lumpinee Stadium. He won the fight by decision.

In 2015 Pettawee moved to New Zealand where he worked as a trainer and kept competing on the local scene. In February 2015, 2017 Pettawee defeated Joey Baylon by unanimous decision.

Pettawee was scheduled to face Zhu Xu at EM-Legend 33 on August 31, 2018, for the WKA World K-1 lightweight title. He won the fight by unanimous decision to capture the title.

Pettawee returned to Thailand in 2020 as a coach at the Sitsongpeenong and Sinbi Muay Thai camps in Phuket. He was scheduled to face Phonek Or Kwanmuang at The Champion Muaythai for his first fight in Thailand in 6 years. He lost the fight by decision.

On April 11, 2021, Pettawee faced Sherzod Kabutov at Muay Thai Super Champ. He lost the fight by decision.

== Titles and accomplishments ==
- Professional Boxing Association of Thailand (PAT)
  - 2005 Thailand 122 lbs Champion
- Onesongchai
  - 2007 S1 World 122 lbs Champion
- World Kick Boxing Federation
  - 2019 WKBF World Muay Thai -62 kg Champion
- World Kickboxing Association
  - 2018 WKA K-1 World Lightweight Champion

== Fight record ==
Muay Thai record
250 Wins (38 (T)KOs), 46 Losses, 10 Draws
| Date | Result | Opponent | Event | Location | Method | Round | Time |
| 2021-04-11 | Loss | (Kyrgyzstan) Sherzod Kabutov | Muay Thai Super Champ | Bangkok, Thailand | Decision | 3 | 3:00 |
| 2020-11-29 | Win | (Argentina) Luca Lassalle | Muay Thai Super Champ | Bangkok, Thailand | Decision | 3 | 3:00 |
| 2020-09-26 | Loss | (Thailand) Phonek Or.Kwanmuang | The Champion Muaythai | Pattaya, Thailand | Decision | 3 | 3:00 |
| 2019-11-16 | Win | (New Zealand) Nikora Lee-Kingi | Capital Punishment 50 | Porirua, New Zealand | Decision (Unanimous) | 5 | 3:00 |
Wins WKBF World Muay Thai -62kg title.
| 2018-12-15 | Win | (New Zealand) Nikora Lee-Kingi | Born To Fight 4 | Auckland, New Zealand | Decision (Unanimous) | 3 | 3:00 |
| 2018-08-31 | Win | (China) Zhu Xu | EM Legend 33 | Auckland, New Zealand | Decision (Unanimous) | 5 | 3:00 |
Wins WKA World K-1 Lightweight title.
| 2018-07-21 | Win | (New Zealand) Dominic Reed | Capital Punbishment 43 | Porirua, New Zealand | Decision (Unanimous) | 5 | 3:00 |
| 2018-06-08 | Win | (New Zealand) Dominic Reed | King in the Ring 75 | Porirua, New Zealand | Decision (Unanimous) | 3 | 3:00 |
| 2018-02-17 | Win | (New Zealand) Kayne Conlan | Capital Punishment 41 | Porirua, New Zealand | Decision (Split) | 5 | 3:00 |
| 2017-11-18 | Win | (New Zealand) Nikora Lee-Kingi | Capital Punishment 40 | Porirua, New Zealand | TKO | 1 | |
| 2017-10-21 | Win | (New Zealand) Mike | Fanta Promotion Thai Boxing F1 | Auckland, New Zealand | | | |
Wins F1 New Zealand -62kg title.
| 2017-02-25 | Win | (New Zealand) Joey Baylon | Capital Punishment 37 | Porirua, New Zealand | Decision (Unanimous) | 5 | 3:00 |
| 2016-05-21 | Win | (New Zealand) Ricky Campbell | Capital Punishment 34 | Wellington, New Zealand | Decision (Unanimous) | 5 | 3:00 |
| 2016-02-27 | Win | (New Zealand) Chris Wells | Capital Punishment 33 | Porirua, New Zealand | Decision (Unanimous) | 5 | 3:00 |
| 2014-11-10 | Loss | (Thailand) Songkom Skahomsin | Onesongchai, Rajadamnern Stadium | Bangkok, Thailand | Decision | 5 | 3:00 |
| 2014-10-08 | Loss | (Thailand) Songkom Skahomsin | Onesongchai, Rajadamnern Stadium | Bangkok, Thailand | Decision | 5 | 3:00 |
| 2014-08-14 | Loss | (Thailand) Superbank Mor Ratanabandit | Rajadamnern Stadium | Bangkok, Thailand | Decision | 5 | 3:00 |
| 2014-07-16 | Loss | (Thailand) Superbank Mor Ratanabandit | Tor.Chaiwat, Rajadamnern Stadium | Bangkok, Thailand | Decision | 5 | 3:00 |
| 2014-06-11 | Win | (Thailand) Sam-A Gaiyanghadao | Phetwiset + Wanmeechai, Rajadamnern Stadium | Bangkok, Thailand | KO (Head kick) | 3 | |
| 2014-03-30 | Win | (Thailand) Rungphet Wor Rungniran | | Songkhla province, Thailand | Decision | 5 | 3:00 |
| 2014-02-28 | Loss | (Thailand) Kaimukkao Por.Thairongruangkamai | Lumpinee Champion Krikkrai, Lumpinee Stadium | Bangkok, Thailand | Decision | 5 | 3:00 |
| 2014-01-07 | Win | (Thailand) Kaewkanglek Gaiyanghadao | Petchpiya, Lumpinee Stadium | Bangkok, Thailand | Decision | 5 | 3:00 |
| 2013-09-28 | Win | (France) Brandon Vieira | Thai Tournament 6 | Lancy, Switzerland | Decision | 5 | 3:00 |
| 2013-09-11 | Loss | (Thailand) Thanonchai Thanakorngym | Sor.Sommai, Lumpinee Stadium | Bangkok, Thailand | Decision | 5 | 3:00 |
| 2013-07-16 | Win | (Thailand) Pokaew Fonjangchonburi | Lumpinee Stadium | Bangkok, Thailand | Decision | 5 | 3:00 |
| 2013-06-03 | Draw | (Thailand) Thanonchai Thanakorngym | Onesongchai, Rajadamnern Stadium | Bangkok, Thailand | Decision | 5 | 3:00 |
| 2013-04-05 | Loss | (Thailand) Thanonchai Thanakorngym | Kiatpetch, Lumpinee Stadium | Bangkok, Thailand | KO (Punch) | 3 | |
| 2012-12-24 | Draw | (Thailand) Saeksan Or. Kwanmuang | Rajadamnern Stadium Anniversary Show | Bangkok, Thailand | Decision | 5 | 3:00 |
| 2012-11-30 | Win | (Thailand) Yodtongthai Por.Telakun | Khunsuk Trakoonyang, Lumpinee Stadium | Bangkok, Thailand | Decision | 5 | 3:00 |
| 2012-11-09 | Win | (Thailand) Yodtongthai Por.Telakun | Phetsuphapan, Lumpinee Stadium | Bangkok, Thailand | Decision | 5 | 3:00 |
| 2012-09-12 | Win | (Thailand) Nongbeer Choknamwong | Tor.Chaiwat, Rajadamnern Stadium | Bangkok, Thailand | KO (Punches) | 5 | |
| 2012-07-25 | Loss | (Thailand) Yokmorakot Petchsimuen | Onesongchai | Thailand | Decision | 5 | 3:00 |
| 2012-03-30 | Loss | (Thailand) Kongsak Sitboonmee | Yala | Thailand | KO | 3 | |
| 2012-02-28 | Loss | (Thailand) Yodwicha Por Boonsit | Phetsupaphan, Lumpinee Stadium | Bangkok, Thailand | Decision | 5 | 3:00 |
For the Omnoi Featherweight title (126 lbs).
| 2012-01-26 | Loss | (Thailand) Phetek Kiatyongyut | Onseongchai, Rajadamnern Stadium | Bangkok, Thailand | Decision | 5 | 3:00 |
| 2011-12-22 | Win | (Thailand) Phetek Kiatyongyut | Rajadamnern Stadium Anniversary Show | Bangkok, Thailand | Decision | 5 | 3:00 |
| 2011-08-18 | Loss | (Thailand) Phetek Kiatyongyut | Onseongchai, Rajadamnern Stadium | Bangkok, Thailand | Decision | 5 | 3:00 |
| 2011-05-06 | Win | (Thailand) Nopakrit Naplatraihoimuk | Khunsuk Trakunhyang Lumpinee Stadium | Bangkok, Thailand | Decision | 5 | 3:00 |
| 2011-03-15 | Win | (Thailand) Saenkeng Jor.Nopparat | Phetsupaphan, Lumpinee Stadium | Bangkok, Thailand | Decision | 5 | 3:00 |
| 2011-02-21 | Loss | (Thailand) Noppakrit Numplatrahoimuk | Onesongchai, Rajadamnern Stadium | Bangkok, Thailand | Decision | 5 | 3:00 |
| 2011-01-18 | Win | (Thailand) Phetto Sitjaopho | Por.Pramuk Rajadamnern Stadium | Bangkok, Thailand | Decision | 5 | 3:00 |
| 2010-11-02 | Loss | (Thailand) Kongsak Sitboonmee | Lumpinee Stadium | Bangkok, Thailand | TKO (Ref stoppage/elbows) | 3 | 3:00 |
| 2010-09-03 | Win | (Thailand) Fahmai Skindewgym | Lumpinee Champion Krikkrai, Lumpinee Stadium | Bangkok, Thailand | Decision | 5 | 3:00 |
| 2010-08-10 | Win | (Thailand) Wuttidet Lukprabat | Petchpiya + Jor.Por.Ror.7, Lumpinee Stadium | Bangkok, Thailand | Decision | 5 | 3:00 |
| 2010-06-10 | Loss | (Thailand) Rungruanglek Lukprabat | Onesongchai, Rajadamnern Stadium | Bangkok, Thailand | Decision | 5 | 3:00 |
| 2010-05-07 | Draw | (Thailand) Rungruanglek Lukprabat | Petchpiya, Lumpinee Stadium | Bangkok, Thailand | Decision | 5 | 3:00 |
| 2010-03-05 | Loss | (Thailand) Sam-A Gaiyanghadao | Lumpinee Champion Krikkrai, Lumpinee Stadium | Bangkok, Thailand | Decision | 5 | 3:00 |
| 2010-02-11 | Win | (Thailand) Phetek Kiatyongyut | Phettongkam, Rajadamnern Stadium | Bangkok, Thailand | Decision | 5 | 3:00 |
| 2009-12-21 | Loss | (Thailand) Pakorn Sakyothin | Daorungchujaroen, Rajadamnern Stadium | Bangkok, Thailand | Decision | 5 | 3:00 |
| 2009-11-26 | Win | (Thailand) Singtongnoi Por.Telakun | Onesongchai, Rajadamnern Stadium | Bangkok, Thailand | Decision | 5 | 3:00 |
| 2009-10-08 | Win | (Thailand) Pakorn Sakyothin | Rajadamnern Stadium | Bangkok, Thailand | KO (Elbow) | 3 | |
| 2009-09-10 | Draw | (Thailand) Manasak Sitniwat | Phettongkam, Rajadamnern Stadium | Bangkok, Thailand | Decision | 5 | 3:00 |
| 2009-08-06 | Win | (Thailand) Sam-A Gaiyanghadao | Rajadamnern Stadium | Bangkok, Thailand | Decision | 5 | 3:00 |
| 2009-07-03 | Loss | (Thailand) Mongkolchai Kwaitonggym | Lumpinee vs Rajadamnern, Lumpinee Stadium | Bangkok, Thailand | Decision | 5 | 3:00 |
| 2009-06-08 | Win | (Thailand) Khaimookdam Sit-O | Onesongchai, Rajadamnern Stadium | Bangkok, Thailand | Decision | 5 | 3:00 |
| 2009-05-07 | Loss | (Thailand) Pakorn Sakyothin | Onesongchai, Rajadamnern Stadium | Bangkok, Thailand | Decision | 5 | 3:00 |
| 2009-03-26 | Draw | (Thailand) Pakorn Sakyothin | Sor.Wanchart, Rajadamnern Stadium | Bangkok, Thailand | Decision | 5 | 3:00 |
| 2009-03-06 | Win | (Thailand) Singtongnoi Por.Telakun | Onesongchai | Maha Sarakham Province, Thailand | Decision | 5 | 3:00 |
| 2009-01-14 | Loss | (Thailand) Singtongnoi Por.Telakun | Onesongchai, Rajadamnern Stadium | Bangkok, Thailand | Decision | 5 | 3:00 |
| 2008-12-18 | Win | (Thailand) Phetto Sitjaopho | Onesongchai, Rajadamnern Stadium | Bangkok, Thailand | Decision | 5 | 3:00 |
| 2008-11-06 | Win | (Thailand) Noppakrit Namplatrahoimuk | Onesongchai, Rajadamnern Stadium | Bangkok, Thailand | Decision | 5 | 3:00 |
| 2008-10-08 | Win | (Thailand) Tong Lukmakhamwan | Jaomuangchon, Rajadamnern Stadium | Bangkok, Thailand | Decision | 5 | 3:00 |
| 2008-08-28 | Draw | (Thailand) Phet-Ek Sitjaopho | Wanthongchai, Rajadamnern Stadium | Bangkok, Thailand | Decision | 5 | 3:00 |
| 2008-07-21 | Win | (Thailand) Detsuriya Sitthiprasert | Phettongkam, Rajadamnern Stadium | Bangkok, Thailand | Decision | 5 | 3:00 |
| 2008-03-26 | Loss | (Thailand) Phetto Sitjaopho | Bangrachan, Rajadamnern Stadium | Bangkok, Thailand | Decision | 5 | 3:00 |
| 2008-02-07 | Win | (Thailand) Chatchainoi GardenSeaview | Onesongchai, Rajadamnern Stadium | Bangkok, Thailand | Decision | 5 | 3:00 |
| 2007-11-24 | Win | (Thailand) Dejsuriya Sitthiprasert | Onesongchai | Thonburi, Thailand | Decision | 5 | 3:00 |
Wins S1 World 122 lbs title.
| 2007-10-04 | Loss | (Thailand) Petchsanugen Sitniwat | Onesongchai, Rajadamnern Stadium | Bangkok, Thailand | Decision | 5 | 3:00 |
| 2007-08-30 | Win | (Thailand) Phaendin Sor.Damrongrit | Onesongchai, Rajadamnern Stadium | Bangkok, Thailand | Decision | 5 | 3:00 |
| 2007-07-16 | Win | (Thailand) Singtongnoi Por.Telakun | Onesongchai, Rajadamnern Stadium | Bangkok, Thailand | Decision | 5 | 3:00 |
| 2007-06-25 | Win | (Thailand) Singtongnoi Por.Telakun | Onesongchai, Rajadamnern Stadium | Bangkok, Thailand | Decision | 5 | 3:00 |
| 2007-03-08 | Loss | (Thailand) Captainken Narupai | Onesongchai, Rajadamnern Stadium | Bangkok, Thailand | TKO | 1 | |
| 2007-02-14 | Win | (Thailand) Denkiri Sor.Sommai | Sor.Sommai, Rajadamnern Stadium | Bangkok, Thailand | Decision | 5 | 3:00 |
| 2006-11-18 | Loss | (Thailand) Loengern Phitakkruchaidan | Omnoi Stadium | Samut Sakhon, Thailand | Decision | 5 | 3:00 |
| 2006-09-09 | Win | (Thailand) Ngathao Attharungroj | Omnoi Stadium | Samut Sakhon, Thailand | Decision | 5 | 3:00 |
| 2006-08-05 | Win | (Thailand) Phet-Ek Sitjaopho | Omnoi Stadium | Samut Sakhon, Thailand | Decision | 5 | 3:00 |
| 2006-06-17 | Loss | (Thailand) Srisuwan Sit Kru Winai | Omnoi Stadium | Samut Sakhon, Thailand | Decision | 5 | 3:00 |
| 2006-05-13 | Win | (Thailand) Rattanasak Wor.Walapon | Omnoi Stadium | Samut Sakhon, Thailand | Decision | 5 | 3:00 |
| 2006-03-23 | Loss | (Thailand) Ronnachai Naratreekul | Kiatyongyut, Rajadamnern Stadium | Bangkok, Thailand | Decision | 5 | 3:00 |
| 2006-01-25 | Loss | (Thailand) Saenchernglek Jirakriangkrai | Daorungchujaroen, Rajadamnern Stadium | Bangkok, Thailand | Decision | 5 | 3:00 |
| 2005-12-19 | Loss | (Thailand) Saenchernglek Jirakriangkrai | Daorungchujaroen, Rajadamnern Stadium | Bangkok, Thailand | Decision | 5 | 3:00 |
| 2005-11-16 | Win | (Thailand) Klairung Sor.SasipaGym | Onesongchai, Rajadamnern Stadium | Bangkok, Thailand | Decision | 5 | 3:00 |
| 2005-09-15 | Win | (Thailand) Dennaklang Sor.Weerapan | Sor.Wanchard, Rajadamnern Stadium | Bangkok, Thailand | Decision | 5 | 3:00 |
| 2005-08-10 | Loss | (Thailand) Pokaew Sitchafuang | Wanmuaythai, Rajadamnern Stadium | Bangkok, Thailand | Decision | 5 | 3:00 |
| 2005-06-17 | Loss | (Thailand) Chalermdet Sor.Tawanrung | Wanboonya, Lumpinee Stadium | Bangkok, Thailand | Decision | 5 | 3:00 |
| 2005-05-06 | Loss | (Thailand) Chalermdet Sor.Tawanrung | Phetyindee + Kor.Sapaotong, Lumpinee Stadium | Bangkok, Thailand | Decision | 5 | 3:00 |
For the WMC World 122 lbs title.
| 2005-03-18 | Win | (Thailand) Traijak Sitjomtrai | Phetyindee + Kor.Sapaotong, Lumpinee Stadium | Bangkok, Thailand | Decision | 5 | 3:00 |
Wins Thailand 122 lbs title.
| 2005-02-01 | Win | (Thailand) Sam-A Gaiyanghadao | Fairtex, Lumpinee Stadium | Bangkok, Thailand | Decision | 5 | 3:00 |
| 2005-01-04 | Draw | (Thailand) Kangwanlek Petchyindee | Petchyindee, Lumpinee Stadium | Bangkok, Thailand | Decision | 5 | 3:00 |
| 2004-12-07 | Win | (Thailand) Kingsang Manoprovitgym | Lumpinee Stadium Birthday Show | Bangkok, Thailand | Decision | 5 | 3:00 |
| 2004-11-02 | Loss | (Thailand) Visanlek Sor.Thosaphon | Lumpinee Stadium | Bangkok, Thailand | Decision | 5 | 3:00 |
| 2004-09-14 | Loss | (Thailand) Petch Por Burapha | Lumpinee Stadium | Bangkok, Thailand | Decision | 5 | 3:00 |
| 2004-08-10 | Win | (Thailand) Romrun Aor.Benjamard | Petchyindee, Lumpinee Stadium | Bangkok, Thailand | Decision | 5 | 3:00 |
| 2004-07-09 | Win | (Thailand) Kompayak Fairtex | Petchpiya, Lumpinee Stadium | Bangkok, Thailand | Decision | 5 | 3:00 |
| 2004-05-18 | Draw | (Thailand) Duangsompong Por.Khumpai | Petchpiya, Lumpinee Stadium | Bangkok, Thailand | Decision | 5 | 3:00 |
| 2004-04-06 | Win | (Thailand) Siamchai Tor.Chalermchai | Paianan, Lumpinee Stadium | Bangkok, Thailand | Decision | 5 | 3:00 |
| 2004-02-14 | Win | (Thailand) J.J Kor Charnsin | Lumpinee Krikrai, Lumpinee Stadium | Bangkok, Thailand | Decision | 5 | 3:00 |
| 2004-01-03 | Loss | (Thailand) Wutichai Sor.Yupinda | Lumpinee Krikrai, Lumpinee Stadium | Bangkok, Thailand | Decision | 5 | 3:00 |
| 2003-12-03 | Loss | (Thailand) Kayasit Chuwattana | Jarumuang, Rajadamnern Stadium | Bangkok, Thailand | Decision | 5 | 3:00 |
| 2003-11-11 | Loss | (Thailand) Burapa Keatnapachai | Paianun, Lumpinee Stadium | Bangkok, Thailand | Decision | 5 | 3:00 |
| 2003-10-08 | Loss | (Thailand) Sakmongkol Lukprabat | Daorungprabat, Rajadamnern Stadium | Bangkok, Thailand | Decision | 5 | 3:00 |
| 2003-09-11 | Win | (Thailand) Samrandej Sor Danchai | Daorungchujaroen, Rajadamnern Stadium | Bangkok, Thailand | Decision | 5 | 3:00 |
| 2003-08-05 | Loss | (Thailand) Hemaraj Chaoraioi | Paianun, Lumpinee Stadium | Bangkok, Thailand | Decision | 5 | 3:00 |
| 2003-06-28 | Win | (Thailand) Prasatphet Sor.Rojpattanasuk | Lumpinee Champion Krikkrai, Lumpinee Stadium | Bangkok, Thailand | Decision | 5 | 3:00 |
| 2002-08-30 | Win | (Thailand) Solex Chor.Rama 6 | Phetpanomrung, Lumpinee Stadium | Bangkok, Thailand | Decision | 5 | 3:00 |
| | Win | (Thailand) Olaydong Sitsamerchai | Lumpinee Stadium | Bangkok, Thailand | Decision | 5 | 3:00 |
| | Win | (Thailand) Sripelnoi Sor.Srisompong | Lumpinee Stadium | Bangkok, Thailand | Decision | 5 | 3:00 |
| | Win | (Thailand) Phuchoeng Tor.Rattanakiat | Lumpinee Stadium | Bangkok, Thailand | Decision | 5 | 3:00 |
| | Win | (Thailand) Detduanglek Por.Pongsawang | Lumpinee Stadium | Bangkok, Thailand | Decision | 5 | 3:00 |
Legend: Win Loss Draw/No contest Notes
