= Pokaew Fonjangchonburi =

Thai former professional Muay Thai fighter

- Born: Phongpan Plengsantia; February 4, 1981 (age 45); Chaiyaphum, Thailand
- Native name: พงพันธ์ เปล่งสันเทียะ
- Other names: Phokaew Banchatmaneesai4 (โพธิ์แก้ว บ้านฉัตรมณีสาย4); Phokaew Sitchafuang (โพธิ์แก้ว ศิษย์จ่าเฟื่อง); Pokaew Sor.Boonya (โพธิ์แก้ว ส.บุญญา)
- Height: 171 cm (5 ft 7 in)
- Division: Bantamweight; Super Bantamweight
- Style: Muay Thai
- Stance: Orthodox
- Team: Fonjangchonburi / Sor.Boonya

Phongpan Plengsantia (Thai: พงพันธ์ เปล่งสันเทียะ; born February 4, 1981), known professionally as Pokaew Fonjangchonburi (Thai: โพธิ์แก้ว ฝนจางชลบุรี) is a Thai former professional Muay Thai fighter.

== Titles and accomplishments ==
- Professional Boxing Association of Thailand (PAT)
  - 1998 Thailand Bantamweight (118 lbs) Champion
  - 2003 Thailand 122 lbs Champion
- Rajadamnern Stadium
  - 2004 Rajadamnern Stadium Super Bantamweight (122 lbs) Champion
- Lumpinee Stadium
  - 2006 Lumpinee Stadium Super Bantamweight (122 lbs) Champion
- Omnoi Stadium
  - 2003 Omnoi Stadium Bantamweight (118 lbs) Champion
  - 2001 11th Isuzu Cup Tournament Runner-up

== Muay Thai record ==
Professional muaythai record
Date	Result	Opponent	Event	Location	Method	Round	Time
2015-09-04	Loss	(Thailand) Rodlek P.K. Saenchaimuaythaigym	Lumpinee Stadium	Bangkok, Thailand	Decision	5	3:00
2015-07-21	Draw	(Thailand) Nawapon Lookpakrist	Lumpinee Stadium	Bangkok, Thailand	Decision	5	3:00
2015-04-21	Loss	(Thailand) Patakthep Sinbeemuaythai	Lumpinee Stadium	Bangkok, Thailand	Decision	5	3:00
2014-12-09	Loss	(Thailand) Yodtongthai Kiatjaroenchai	Lumpinee Stadium	Bangkok, Thailand	TKO (Elbow)	2	
2014-08-29	Loss	(Thailand) Muangthai PKSaenchaimuaythaigym	Lumpinee Stadium	Bangkok, Thailand	KO (Left Elbow)	2	1:45
2014-08-05	Win	(Thailand) Muangthai PKSaenchaimuaythaigym	Lumpinee Stadium	Thailand	Decision	5	3:00
2014-07-08	Win	(Thailand) Pornsanae Sitmonchai	Lumpinee Stadium	Bangkok, Thailand	TKO (punches)	2	
2014-03-02	Loss	(Thailand) Songkom Srisuriyunyothin	Channel 7 Boxing Stadium	Bangkok, Thailand	Decision	5	3:00
2014-01-28	Draw	(Thailand) Jompichit Chuwattana	Lumpinee Stadium	Bangkok, Thailand	Decision	5	3:00
2013-10-25	Loss	(Thailand) Kaewkangwan Kaiyanghadao	Lumpinee Stadium	Bangkok, Thailand	Decision	5	3:00
2013-07-16	Loss	(Thailand) Pettawee Sor Kittichai	Lumpinee Stadium	Bangkok, Thailand	Decision	5	3:00
2013-06-07	Loss	(Thailand) Phetmorakot Petchyindee Academy	Lumpinee Stadium	Bangkok, Thailand	TKO (knees)	3	
2013-05-07	Win	(Thailand) Thanonchai Thanakorngym	Lumpinee Stadium	Bangkok, Thailand	Decision	5	3:00
2013-03-30	Loss	(Thailand) Penake Sitnumnoi		Koh Samui, Thailand	Decision	5	3:00
For the WPMF World Super Featherweight (130 lbs) title.
2013-03-10	Loss	(Turkey) Yetkin Özkul	Le Choc des Légendes	Paris, France	DQ (Strikes after the bell)	2	3:00
2013-02-07	Draw	(Thailand) Sam-A Gaiyanghadao	Rajadamnern Stadium	Bangkok, Thailand	Decision	5	3:00
2012-12-07	Loss	(Thailand) Sam-A Gaiyanghadao	Lumpinee Stadium	Bangkok, Thailand	Decision	5	3:00
For the Thailand Super Bantamweight (122 lbs) title. 2 million baht side-bet
2012-11-06	Win	(Thailand) Ritidej Thor.Thepsuthin	Lumpinee Stadium	Bangkok, Thailand	Decision	5	3:00
2012-10-04	Win	(Thailand) Petpanomrung Kiatmuu9	Wanmitchai Fights, Rajadamnern Stadium	Bangkok, Thailand	Decision	5	3:00
2012-09-11	Win	(Thailand) Tong PuiD9D	Lumpinee Stadium	Bangkok, Thailand	Decision	5	3:00
2012-07-06	Win	(Thailand) Petpanomrung Kiatmuu9	Suekpetchpiya Fights, Lumpinee Stadium	Bangkok, Thailand	Decision	5	3:00
2012-05-01	Win	(Thailand) Rungrat Sor Jor.Toipaedriew	Lumpinee Stadium	Bangkok, Thailand	Decision	5	3:00
2012-03-09	Loss	(Thailand) Thong Puideenaidee	Lumpinee Stadium	Bangkok, Thailand	Decision	5	3:00
2012-01-12	Win	(Thailand) Lekkla Thanasuranakorn	Rajadamnern Stadium	Bangkok, Thailand	Decision	5	3:00
2011-09-09	Win	(Thailand) Lekkla Thanasuranakorn	Lumpinee Stadium	Bangkok, Thailand	Decision	5	3:00
2011-07-10	Loss	(Thailand) Saenkeng Chor.Nopparat	Channel 7 Boxing Stadium	Thailand	Decision	5	3:00
2011-05-27	Loss	(Thailand) Penake Sitnumnoi	Lumpinee Stadium	Thailand	Decision	5	3:00
2011-03-08	Loss	(Thailand) Sam-A Gaiyanghadao	Lumpinee Stadium	Bangkok, Thailand	Decision	5	3:00
2011-01-25	Win	(Thailand) Sanghiran Lukbanyai	Lumpinee Stadium	Bangkok, Thailand	Decision	5	3:00
2010-11-28	Win	(Thailand) Santipap Sit Ubon	Channel 7 Boxing Stadium	Bangkok, Thailand	Decision	5	3:00
2010-09-10	Loss	(Thailand) Phetek Kiatyongyut	Pumpanmuang Fight, Lumpinee Stadium	Bangkok, Thailand	Decision	5	3:00
2007-07-03		(Thailand) Famechai FA.Group	Lumpinee Stadium	Bangkok, Thailand	Decision	5	3:00
2007-03-02	Loss	(Thailand) Pinsiam Sor.Amnuaysirichoke	Lumpinee Stadium	Bangkok, Thailand	Decision	5	3:00
Loses the Lumpinee Stadium Super Bantamweight (122 lbs) title.
2007-01-30	Win	(Thailand) Nong-O Gaiyanghadao	Phetyindee Fights, Lumpinee Stadium	Bangkok, Thailand	Decision	5	3:00
2006-11-09	Loss	(Thailand) Nong-O Gaiyanghadao	Phetjaopraya Fights, Lumpinee Stadium	Bangkok, Thailand	Decision	5	3:00
2006-10-18	Win	(Thailand) Nong-O Gaiyanghadao	Phetpiya Fights, Lumpinee Stadium	Bangkok, Thailand	Decision	5	3:00
Wins the Lumpinee Stadium Super Bantamweight (122 lbs) title.
2005-08-10	Win	(Thailand) Pettawee Sor Kittichai	Rajadamnern Stadium	Bangkok, Thailand	Decision	5	3:00
2004-09-07	Win	(Thailand) Chalermdet Sor.Tawanrung	Petchyindee, Lumpinee Stadium	Bangkok, Thailand	Ref.stop. (Chalermdet dismissed)	5	
2004-04-10	Loss	(Thailand) Densayam Lukprabat	Rajadamnern Stadium	Bangkok, Thailand	Decision	5	3:00
Loses the Thailand Super Bantamweight (122 lbs) title.
2004-02-12	Win	(Thailand) Densayam Lukprabat	Rajadamnern Stadium	Bangkok, Thailand	Decision	5	3:00
Wins the Rajadamnern Stadium Super Bantamweight (122 lbs) title.
2004-03-20	Win	(Thailand) Phutawan Buriramphukaofai	Rajadamnern Stadium	Bangkok, Thailand	Decision	5	3:00
2003-10-24	Win	(Thailand) Rittidet Newmuangkhon	Lumpinee Stadium	Bangkok, Thailand	Decision	5	3:00
2003-02-01	Win	(Thailand) Yodlada Daopaedriew	Omnoi Stadium	Samut Sakhon, Thailand	Decision	5	3:00
Wins the vacant Omnoi Stadium Bantamweight (118 lbs) title.
2002-07-27	Win	(Thailand) Pinsiam Sor.Amnuaysirichoke	Omnoi Stadium	Samut Sakhon, Thailand	Decision	5	3:00
2002-05-11	Loss	(Thailand) Rungjarat SKV Gym	Omnoi Stadium	Samut Sakhon, Thailand	Decision	5	3:00
2001-06-09	Win	(Thailand) Banpot Tor.Silanoi	Omnoi Stadium	Samut Sakhon, Thailand	Decision	5	3:00
2001-03-24	Loss	(Thailand) Sanchernglek Jirakriangkrai	Omnoi Stadium - Isuzu Cup Final	Samut Sakhon, Thailand	Decision	5	3:00
For the Isuzu Cup title.
2001-01-20	Win	(Thailand) Komkrit Tor.Phithakkonkan	Omnoi Stadium - Isuzu Cup	Samut Sakhon, Thailand	Decision	5	3:00
2000-12-02	Win	(Thailand) Kongpipop Petchyindee	Omnoi Stadium - Isuzu Cup	Samut Sakhon, Thailand	Decision	5	3:00
1998-12-23	Win	(Thailand) Anuwat Kaewsamrit		Bangkok, Thailand	Decision	5	3:00
1998-04-18	Win	(Thailand) Wuttidet Lukprabat	Omnoi Stadium	Samut Sakhon, Thailand	Decision	5	3:00
Legend: Win Loss Draw/No contest Notes

== See also ==
- List of male kickboxers
