= Kaew Fairtex =

Thai professional Muay Thai fighter and kickboxer

- Born: Sarawut Prapraipetch; September 5, 1984 (age 42); Thonburi, Thailand
- Native name: สราวุธ ประไพเพชร
- Other names: Kaew Weerasakreck
- Height: 169 cm (5 ft 7 in)
- Division: Super Lightweight
- Style: Muay Thai
- Stance: Southpaw
- Fighting out of: Pattaya, Thailand
- Team: Fairtex Pattaya Gym (2005-2019)
- Years active: c. 1994–2019

Kickboxing record
- Total: 186
- Wins: 146
- By knockout: 45
- Losses: 36
- Draws: 4

Sarawut Prapraipetch Thai: สราวุธ ประไพเพชร; born September 5, 1984), known professionally as Kaew Fairtex (Thai: แก้ว แฟร์เท็กซ์; born September 5, 1984), is a Thai professional Muay Thai fighter and kickboxer. He is the former two-time K-1 Super Lightweight Champion, a three-time K-1 Super Lightweight World Grand Prix winner, and the two-division Lumpinee Stadium champion.

Combat Press ranked Kaew Fairtex as a top ten featherweight (-66 kg) kickboxer in the world for seven consecutive years, i.e. between December 2014 and July 2021.

== Kickboxing career ==
=== First K-1 title reign ===
==== First Super Lightweight Grand Prix ====
On September 5, 2014, it was announced that Kaew would be one of eight participants in the one-day K-1 Super Lightweight World Grand Prix, which was held on November 3, 2014, and would face the reigning Krush Lightweight titleholder Hideaki Yamazaki in the tournament quarterfinals. He won the fight by a narrow unanimous decision, with all three judges awarding him a 30–29 scorecard. Kaew advanced to the semifinals, where he faced the two-time Krush Grand Prix winner and former welterweight champion Yuta Kubo. He floored Kubo with a right hook at the 1:52 minute mark of the second round, which left the Japanese fighter unable to rise from the canvas. Kaew faced Yasuomi Soda in the tournament finals and was able to overcome him by majority decision, with scores of 30–28, 30–29 and 29–29. Kaew dedicated his win to his father, who died a week before the tournament.

==== Title defenses ====
Kaew faced Minoru Kimura at K-1 World GP 2015 -60kg Championship Tournament on January 18, 2015. He lost the fight by majority decision. Kaew returned to muay thai to face Kenta Yamada at WPMF JAPAN×REBELS SUK WEERASAKRECK FAIRTEX on March 22, 2015. He won the fight by unanimous decision, with scores of 49–47, 49–48 and 50–48.

After beating Zhang Chunyu by unanimous decision at Kunlun Fight 26 on June 7, 2015, Kaew was booked to face Yasuomi Soda in a rematch at K-1 World GP 2015 -70kg Championship Tournament on July 4, 2015. He was more successful than in their first meeting, as he won the fight by unanimous decision, with all three judges scoring the bout 30–26 in his favor. Kaew knocked his opponent down with a one-two near the end of the second round.

Kaew made his first K-1 Super Lightweight title defense against Minoru Kimura at K-1 World GP 2015 The Championship on November 21, 2015. He avenged his first loss under K-1 rules with a first-round stoppage of Kimura. Kaew made his second title defense against Massaro Glunder at K-1 World GP 2016 -65kg Japan Tournament on March 4, 2016. He won the fight by split decision. Two of the judges scored the bout 29–28 in his favor, while the third judge had it scored 28–27 for Glunder. Both fighters were deducted a point in the second round for excessive clinching. Kaew next faced Ilias Bulaid in a non-title bout at K-1 World GP 2016 -60kg Japan Tournament on April 24, 2016. He won the fight by unanimous decision, with a 30–29 score on all three scorecards.

==== Second Super Lightweight Grand Prix ====
Kaew was announced as one of eight participants in the 2016 one-night K-1 Super Lightweight World Grand Prix, which took place on June 24, 2016. He faced the inaugural Krush Super Lightweight champion Hiroya Kawabe in the quarterfinals. Kaew needed just 36 seconds to knock Hiroya out with a well place left hook, which earned him a place in the semifinals opposite Masaaki Noiri. He beat Noiri by unanimous decision, with two scorecards of 29–28 and one scorecard of 30–29. Kaew faced Ilias Bulaid in the tournament finals, having already overcome the Enfusion champion by unanimous decision two months prior. He was even more convincing in the rematch, as he stopped Bulaid by technical knockout in the second round.

==== Title loss ====
Kaew made his Wu Lin Feng debut against Wang Pengfei at Wu Lin Feng 2016 World Kickboxing Championship on January 14, 2017. He knocked Pengfei down once in the third round, en-route to winning the fight by unanimous decision, with scores of 30–26, 29–27 and 29–27. Kaew made his third K-1 Super Lightweight title defense against the 2016 K-1 World GP 2016 -65kg Japan Tournament winner Hideaki Yamazaki at K-1 World GP 2017 Super Bantamweight Championship Tournament on April 22, 2017. He won the fight by unanimous decision, with all three ringside officials awarding him a 30–28 scorecard.

Kaew made his fourth championship defense against Masaaki Noiri, who he had previously beaten by unanimous decision in the semifinals of the 2016 K-1 Super Lightweight World Grand Prix, at K-1 World GP 2017 Super Middleweight Championship Tournament on June 18, 2017. He lost the fight by a close and controversial split decision, after an extra fourth round was contested.

=== Second K-1 title reign ===
==== Third Super Lightweight Grand Prix ====
After suffering his second K-1 loss, Kaew faced Liu Wei at Hero Legend 2017 on September 17, 2017. He won the fight by a second-round technical knockout. Kaew returned to K-1 to face the 19-year old Ren Hiramoto at K-1 World GP 2018: K'FESTA.1 on March 21, 2018. He lost the fight by a second-round knockout, Kaew's lost in his next appearance as well, as he suffered a unanimous decision loss at the hands of Qiu Jianliang at Glory of Heroes 31 on May 26, 2018.

On September 4, 2018, it was revealed that Kaew would take part in the 2018 K-1 Super Lightweight World Grand Prix as well, which took place on November 3, 2018, and would face the K-1 WORLD MAX 2010 Lightweight Japan Tournament winner Tetsuya Yamato in the quarterfinals. He stopped Yamato with a head kick, 92 seconds into the opening round. Kaew advanced to the penultimate bout of the one-night tournament, where he faced Yasuomi Soda, who he had beaten twice already. He won the trilogy fight by unanimous decision, after an extra fourth round was contested. Kaew captured his third Grand Prix title after he overcame Daizo Sasaki by unanimous decision in the finals, with two scorecards of 30–29 and one scorecard of 29–28.

==== Title loss ====
Kaew made the first title defense of his second title reign against Rukiya Anpo, who entered the fight on a three-fight win streak, at K-1 World GP 2019: Super Bantamweight World Tournament on June 30, 2019. Anpo initially missed weight by 150 grams at the official weigh-ins, although he was able to make the mark on his second attempt. The fight was ruled a majority decision draw after the first three rounds, with two judge seeing the fight as a draw, while the third judge scored it 29–28 for Anpo. Kaew lost the fight by unanimous decision after the extension round was fought. He was deducted a point in the fourth round for pulling down on Anpo's head. An immediate rematch took place at K-1 World GP 2019 Japan: ～Women's Flyweight Championship Tournament～ on December 28, 2019. Anpo was once again declared the winner by unanimous decision, after an extra fourth round was fought.

== Championships and accomplishments ==
=== Kickboxing ===
- K-1
  - 2014 K-1 Super Lightweight (65kg) Champion
    - Three successful title defense
  - 2014 K-1 Super Lightweight World Grand Prix Winner
  - 2016 K-1 Super Lightweight World Grand Prix Winner
  - 2018 K-1 Super Lightweight World Grand Prix Winner
- Hero Legend
  - 2012 Hero Legend Asia 65 kg Tournament Winner
- Space ONE
  - 2024 Space ONE World -65 kg Champion

Awards

- eFight.jp
  - Fighter of the Month (September 2013)

=== Muay Thai ===
- Professional Boxing Association of Thailand
  - 2005 Thailand Featherweight (126 lbs) Champion
- World Boxing Council Muay Thai
  - 2006 WBC Muay Thai World Super Featherweight (130 lbs) Champion
    - One successful title defense
- Lumpinee Stadium
  - 2006 Lumpinee Stadium Featherweight (126 lbs) Champion
    - One successful title defense
  - 2009 Lumpinee Stadium Lightweight (135 lbs) Champion
- World Professional Muaythai Federation
  - 2014 WPMF World Super Lightweight (140 lbs) Champion

== Fight record ==
Kickboxing record
146 Wins (45 (T)KO's, 100 decisions), 36 Losses 4 Draws
Date	Result	Opponent	Event	Location	Method	Round	Time
2024-11-16	Win	(China) Liu Chunrui	Space ONE Champions	Foshan, China	Decision	3	3:00
Wins the vacant Space ONE Champions World -65kg title.
2019-12-28	Loss	(Japan) Rukiya Anpo	K-1 World GP 2019 Japan: ～Women's Flyweight Championship Tournament～	Nagoya, Japan	Ext.R Decision (Unanimous)	4	3:00
For the K-1 Super Lightweight (-65kg) title.
2019-06-30	Loss	(Japan) Rukiya Anpo	K-1 World GP 2019: Super Bantamweight World Tournament	Saitama, Japan	Ext.R Decision (Unanimous)	4	3:00
Loses the K-1 Super Lightweight (-65kg) title.
2018-11-03	Win	(Japan) Daizo Sasaki	K-1 World GP 2018: Super Lightweight Championship Tournament, Final	Saitama Prefecture, Japan	Decision (Unanimous)	3	3:00
Wins K-1 World GP -65kg Tournament and the vacant K-1 Super Lightweight (-65kg) title.
2018-11-03	Win	(Japan) Yasuomi Soda	K-1 World GP 2018: Super Lightweight Championship Tournament, Semi-finals	Saitama Prefecture, Japan	Ext. R. Decision (Unanimous)	4	3:00
2018-11-03	Win	(Japan) Tetsuya Yamato	K-1 World GP 2018: Super Lightweight Championship Tournament, Quarter-finals	Saitama Prefecture, Japan	KO (Left High Kick)	1	1:32
2018-05-26	Loss	(China) Qiu Jianliang	Glory of Heroes 31	Beijing, China	Decision (Unanimous)	3	3:00
2018-03-21	Loss	(Japan) Ren Hiramoto	K-1 World GP 2018: K'FESTA.1	Saitama, Japan	KO (Punches)	2	2:18
2017-09-09	Win	(China) Liu Wei	Hero Legend 2017	Taian, China	TKO(cut/doctor stops)	2	
2017-06-18	Loss	(Japan) Masaaki Noiri	K-1 World GP 2017 Super Middleweight Championship Tournament	Tokyo, Japan	Ext. R. Decision (Split)	4	3:00
Loses the K-1 Super Lightweight (-65kg) title.
2017-04-22	Win	(Japan) Hideaki Yamazaki	K-1 World GP 2017 Super Bantamweight Championship Tournament	Tokyo, Japan	Decision (Unanimous)	3	3:00
Defends the K-1 Super Lightweight (-65kg) title.
2017-01-14	Win	(China) Wang Pengfei	Wu Lin Feng 2016 World Kickboxing Championship	Zhengzhou, China	Decision (Unanimous)	3	3:00
2016-06-24	Win	(Morocco) Ilias Bulaid	K-1 World GP 2016 -65kg World Tournament, Final	Tokyo, Japan	TKO (Knee to the body)	2	2:26
Wins the K-1 World GP 2016 -65kg World Tournament.
2016-06-24	Win	(Japan) Masaaki Noiri	K-1 World GP 2016 -65kg World Tournament, Semi-finals	Tokyo, Japan	Decision (Unanimous)	3	3:00
2016-06-24	Win	(Japan) Hiroya Kawabe	K-1 World GP 2016 -65kg World Tournament, Quarter-finals	Tokyo, Japan	KO (Left hook)	1	0:36
2016-04-24	Win	(Morocco) Ilias Bulaid	K-1 World GP 2016 -60kg Japan Tournament	Tokyo, Japan	Decision (unanimous)	3	3:00
2016-03-04	Win	(Netherlands) Massaro Glunder	K-1 World GP 2016 -65kg Japan Tournament	Tokyo, Japan	Decision (Split)	3	3:00
Defends the K-1 -65kg Championship
2015-11-21	Win	(Brazil) Minoru Kimura	K-1 World GP 2015 The Championship	Tokyo, Japan	KO (overhand left & left high knee)	1	2:55
Defends the K-1 -65kg Championship.
2015-07-04	Win	(Japan) Yasuomi Soda	K-1 World GP 2015 -70kg Championship Tournament	Tokyo, Japan	Decision (unanimous)	3	3:00
2015-06-07	Win	(China) Zhang Chunyu	Kunlun Fight 26	Chongqing, China	Decision (Unanimous)	3	3:00
2015-03-22	Win	(Japan) Kenta Yamada	WPMF JAPAN×REBELS SUK WEERASAKRECK FAIRTEX	Tokyo, Japan	Decision (unanimous)	5	3:00
2015-01-18	Loss	(Brazil) Minoru Kimura	K-1 World GP 2015 -60kg Championship Tournament	Tokyo, Japan	Decision (Majority)	3	3:00
2014-11-03	Win	(Japan) Yasuomi Soda	K-1 World GP 2014 -65kg Championship Tournament, Final	Tokyo, Japan	Decision (Majority)	3	3:00
Wins the K-1 -65kg Championship and the K-1 World GP 2014 -65kg World Tournament.
2014-11-03	Win	(Japan) Yuta Kubo	K-1 World GP 2014 -65kg Championship Tournament, Semi-finals	Tokyo, Japan	KO (Right hook)	2	1:52
2014-11-03	Win	(Japan) Hideaki Yamazaki	K-1 World GP 2014 -65kg Championship Tournament, Quarter-finals	Tokyo, Japan	Decision (Unanimous)	3	3:00
2014-07-12	Win	(Japan) Kosuke Komiyama	RISE 100 -Blade 0-	Tokyo, Japan	Decision (Unanimous)	3	3:00
2014-04-06	Win	(Mongolia) Enkhamar Batbayar	Thai Fight	Sattahip, Thailand	TKO	2	
2014-02-11	Win	(Japan) Hiroki Ishii	Rikix "No Kick, No Life 2014"	Tokyo, Japan	KO (Left high kick)	2	0:44
Wins the vacant WPMF World Super Lightweight (140 lbs) title.
2014-01-17	Win	(Australia) Victor Nagbe	Muay Thai Warriors in Phuket	Phuket, Thailand	Decision (Unanimous)	5	3:00
2013-11-17	Win	(France) Julene	M-Fight Suk Weerasakreck IV Part.1	Tokyo, Japan	KO (Right hook)	2	1:19
2013-09-15	Win	(Japan) Genji Umeno	M-Fight Suk Weerasakreck III Part.2	Tokyo, Japan	TKO (3 Knock downs)	2	1:14
2013-06-16	Win	(Japan) Hideya Tanaka	M-Fight Suk Weerasakreck II Part.2	Tokyo, Japan	TKO (Left elbow)	2	2:06
2013-03-24	Win	(Japan) Daiki Watabe	M-Fight Suk Weerasakreck I Part.2	Tokyo, Japan	Decision (Unanimous)	3	3:00
2013-03-02	Loss	(France) Dylan Salvador	Warriors Night 1	Paris, France	Decision (Unanimous)	5	3:00
2012-12-02	Win	(Japan) Satoshi Taniguchi	RISE/M-1MC -Infinity-	Tokyo, Japan	KO (Left high kick)	1	0:12
2012-11-11	Win	(Japan) Yusuke Sugawara	M-1 Muay thai Challenge Sutt Yod Muaythai vol.4 Part2	Tokyo, Japan	KO (Left elbow)	2	0:59
2012-09-09	Win	(South Korea) Suman "Osamitsu Taka" Ko	M-1 Muay Thai Challenge Sutt Yod Muaythai vol.3 Part2	Tokyo, Japan	KO (Punches)	4	1:45
2012-04-21	Win	(Thailand) Yodvisanu Fairtex	Hero Legend 2012 - Asia 65 kg Tournament, Final	Heze, China	KO (Left hook)	1	
Wins the 2012 Hero Legend Asia 65kg Tournament.
2012-04-21	Win	(China) Liu Wei	Hero Legend 2012 - Asia 65 kg Tournament, Semi-finals	Heze, China	KO (Knee to the body)	3	
2012-04-21	Win	(Japan) Taito Ike	Hero Legend 2012 - Asia 65 kg Tournament, Quarter-finals	Heze, China	KO (Left hook)	3	1:21
2012-03-03	Loss	(Thailand) Farmongkon Sor Jor Danyarong	Omnoi Stadium	Bangkok, Thailand	Decision	5	3:00
2011-11-05	Win	(China) Zhang Bo	Hero Legend 2011	Changsha, China	Decision	3	3:00
2011-08-13	Win	(China) Peng Dong	Hero Legend 2011	Nanchang, China	Decision	3	3:00
2011-07-06	Win	(Thailand) Ninmongkol Kaennorasing	Fairtex Thepprasit Boxing Stadium	Pattaya, Thailand	KO (Right hook)	2	
2009-12-19	Loss	(China) Xu Jifu	Chinese Kung Fu vs Muaythai	Foshan, China	Decision	5	3:00
2009-10-02	Loss	(Thailand) Superball Lookjaomaesaivary	Lumpinee Stadium	Bangkok, Thailand	Decision	5	3:00
2009-09-08	Win	(Thailand) Sarawuth Loogbaanyai	Lumpinee Stadium	Bangkok, Thailand	TKO	3	
2009-06-21	Loss	(Thailand) Jomthong Chuwattana	M-1 Fairtex Muay Thai Challenge 2009 Yod Nak Suu vol.2	Tokyo, Japan	Decision (Majority)	5	3:00
2009-04-25	Loss	(Thailand) Singdam Kiatmoo9	Lumpinee Stadium	Bangkok, Thailand	Decision	5	3:00
2009-03-21	Win	(Thailand) Duangsompong Kor.Sapaotong	Lumpinee Stadium	Bangkok, Thailand	Decision	5	3:00
Wins the Lumpinee Stadium Lightweight (135 lbs) title.
2009-01-24	Win	(Thailand) Yodbuangam Lukbanyai	Lumpinee Krikkrai, Lumpinee Stadium	Bangkok, Thailand	Decision	5	3:00
2008-12-13	Loss	(Thailand) Singdam Kiatmoo9	Lumpinee Stadium	Bangkok, Thailand	Decision	5	3:00
2008-11-01	Win	(Thailand) Lerdsila Chumpairtour	Lumpinee Krikkrai, Lumpinee Stadium	Thailand	Decision	5	3:00
2008-09-26	Win	(Thailand) Lerdsila Chumpairtour	Wanboonya, Lumpinee Stadium	Bangkok, Thailand	Decision	5	3:00
2008-08-05	Loss	(Thailand) Longhern Por Muangthungsong	Lumpinee Stadium	Bangkok, Thailand	Decision	5	3:00
2008-04-01	Win	(Thailand) Manjanoi Kiatnapachai	Phetpiya, Lumpinee Stadium	Bangkok, Thailand	Decision	5	3:00
2008-03-11	Win	(Thailand) Pansak Look Bor Kor	Lumpinee Stadium	Bangkok, Thailand	TKO	2	
2008-02-12	Win	(Thailand) Supachaileg Sitkomsorn	Lumpinee Stadium	Bangkok, Thailand	Decision	5	3:00
2007-11-29	Loss	(Thailand) Chalermdet Sor.Tawanrung	Kai Yang Ha Dao Tournament, Quarterfinals	Thailand	Decision	3	3:00
2007-09-08	Win	(Japan) Genki Yamamoto	World Championship Muaythai	California, USA	Decision (Unanimous)	5	3:00
Defends the WBC Muay Thai World Super Featherweight (130 lbs) title.
2007-03-02	Loss	(Thailand) Santipap Sitauaubon	Lumpinee champions Krikkrai, Lumpinee Stadium	Bangkok, Thailand	Decision	5	3:00
Loses the Lumpinee Stadium Featherweight (126 lbs) title.
2006-12-08	Win	(Thailand) Sarawut Lookbanyai	50 years Lumpinee Krikkrai Fights, Lumpinee Stadium	Bangkok, Thailand	Decision	5	3:00
Defends the Lumpinee Stadium Featherweight (126 lbs) title.
2006-09-01	Win	(Thailand) Petchmankong Sit Or.	Por.Pramuk, Lumpinee Stadium	Bangkok, Thailand	TKO	3	
2006-08-08	Loss	(Thailand) Orono Wor Petchpun	Fairtex, Lumpinee Stadium	Bangkok, Thailand	Decision	5	3:00
2006-06-06	Win	(Thailand) Traijak Sitjomtrai	Paianun, Lumpinee Stadium	Bangkok, Thailand	Decision	5	3:00
Wins the vacant Lumpinee Stadium Featherweight (126 lbs) title.
2006-05-13	Win	(Poland) Tomasz Makowski	Best Of The Best II			5	
2006-03-31	Win	(Thailand) Yodwanlop Por Nattachai	Lumpinee Stadium	Bangkok, Thailand	Decision	5	
2006-01-28	Win	(South Korea) In-Wook Bin	Noche de Campeones	Cancun, Mexico	TKO (Referee stoppage)	4	
Wins the vacant WBC Muay Thai World Super Featherweight (130 lbs) title.
2005-12-20	Loss	(Thailand) Yodwanlop P.Nuttachai	Wanboonya, Lumpinee Stadium	Bangkok, Thailand	Decision (Unanimous)	5	3:00
2005-11-25	Win	(Thailand) Kaonar Tor.Phonchai	Petchyindee, Lumpinee Stadium	Bangkok, Thailand	TKO	2	
2005-10-18	Loss	(Thailand) Traijak Sitjomtrai	Lumpinee Stadium	Bangkok, Thailand	TKO	2	
2005-09-27	Loss	(Thailand) Singdam Kiatmuu9	Lumpinee Stadium	Bangkok, Thailand	Decision	5	3:00
2005-07-24	Win	(Japan) Genki Yamamoto	AJKF "Super Fight"	Tokyo, Japan	Decision (Unanimous)	5	3:00
2005-07-01	Win	(Thailand) Yuttajak Tungsongtaksin	Wanboonya, Lumpinee Stadium	Bangkok, Thailand	TKO	2	
Wins the Thailand Featherweight (126 lbs) title.
2005-04-05	Win	(Thailand) Phutawan Burirumpukaofire	Fairtex, Lumpinee Stadium	Bangkok, Thailand	TKO	4	
2005-03-31	Win	(Thailand) Yodwanlop Por.Nuttachai	Phetyindee, Lumpinee Stadium	Bangkok, Thailand	Decision	5	3:00
2004-12-07	Loss	(Thailand) Phetmanee Phetsupapan	Lumpinee Stadium 48th Anniversary Show	Bangkok, Thailand	Decision	5	3:00
2004-11-12	Win	(Thailand) Traijak Sitjomtrai	Fairtex, Lumpinee Stadium	Bangkok, Thailand	TKO	4	
2004-09-14	Loss	(Thailand) Doungsompong P.Khumpai	Petchpiya, Lumpinee Stadium	Bangkok, Thailand	Decision (Unanimous)	5	3:00
2004-07-16	Win	(Thailand) Sarawut Lukbanyai	Wanboonya, Lumpinee Stadium	Bangkok, Thailand	Decision (Unanimous)	5	3:00
2004-06-22	Win	(Thailand) AAA T.Rattanakiat	Fairtex, Lumpinee Stadium	Bangkok, Thailand	Decision	5	3:00
2004-05-14	Win	(Thailand) Chalermkiat Kiatphakin	Fairtex, Lumpinee Stadium	Bangkok, Thailand	Decision (Unanimous)	5	3:00
2004-03-30	Loss	(Thailand) Wutichai Sor Yupinda	Lumpinee Stadium	Bangkok, Thailand	Decision (Unanimous)	5	3:00
2004-01-20	Loss	(Thailand) Ritthideat Sitmoseng	Fairtex, Lumpinee Stadium	Bangkok, Thailand	Decision	5	3:00
2003-12-20	Loss	(Thailand) Lermtong 13Reanresort	Krikkrai, Lumpinee Stadium	Bangkok, Thailand	Decision	5	3:00
2003-11-14	Loss	(Thailand) Wuttidet Lukprabat	World Boxing WBC, Lumpinee Stadium	Bangkok, Thailand	Decision	5	3:00
2003-10-24	Win	(Thailand) Metee K.Champfarm	Fairtex, Lumpinee Stadium	Bangkok, Thailand	Decision	5	3:00
2003-09-19	Win	(Thailand) Pinsiam Sor.Amnuaysirichoke	Petchpiya, Lumpinee Stadium	Bangkok, Thailand	Decision	5	3:00
2003-08-16	Loss	(Thailand) Yodsaenklai Fairtex	Krikkai, Lumpinee Stadium	Bangkok, Thailand	Decision	5	3:00
2003-07-05	Win	(Thailand) Wanmeechai Menayotin	Kirkkai, Lumpinee Stadium	Bangkok, Thailand	Decision	5	3:00
2003-06-07	Win	(Thailand) Yodradub Keatparathai	Muaythai Lumpinee Kirkkai, Lumpinee Stadium	Bangkok, Thailand	Decision	5	3:00
2003-04-08	Draw	(Thailand) Phutawan buriramPhukaefai	Lumpinee Stadium	Bangkok, Thailand	Decision	5	3:00
2003-02-18	Win	(Thailand) Kangwanlek Petchyindee		Bangkok, Thailand	Decision	5	3:00
2003-01-07	Loss	(Thailand) Nopparat Keatkhamtorn	Lumpinee Stadium	Bangkok, Thailand	Decision	5	3:00
2002-11-12	Win	(Thailand) Rittidet Maimuangkon	Lumpinee Stadium	Bangkok, Thailand	Decision	5	3:00
2002-09-28	Win	(Thailand) Kangwanlek Petchyindee	Lumpinee Stadium	Bangkok, Thailand	Decision	5	3:00
2001-09-07	Draw	(Thailand) Phetek Kiatyongyut	Lumpinee Stadium	Bangkok, Thailand	Decision	5	3:00
2001-05-25	Win	(Thailand) Banchachai Lukbanyai	Lumpinee Stadium	Bangkok, Thailand	KO	2	
Legend: Win Loss Draw/No contest Notes

== See also ==
- List of male kickboxers
- List of K-1 champions
