= Spencer Brown (fighter) =

Scottish kickboxer

- Born: 24 July 1997 (age 29); Irvine, Scotland
- Height: 1.75 m (5 ft 9 in)
- Weight: 65 kg (143 lb; 10 st 3 lb)
- Division: Super Lightweight
- Style: Muay Thai
- Stance: Orthodox
- Fighting out of: Bangkok, Thailand
- Team: YOKKAO Fight Team
- Teachers: Saenchai, Singdam
- Trainer: Kru Petchdam YOKKAO (Kru Jack)

Kickboxing record
- Total: 29
- Wins: 22
- By knockout: 9
- Losses: 6
- Draws: 1
- Last updated on: 7 May 2019

Spencer Brown, also known as Spencer YokkaoSaenchaiGym, is a Scottish super lightweight Muay Thai kickboxer currently fighting out of YOKKAO Training Center Bangkok in Thailand. He is a WBC Muay Thai European champion.

== Biography ==
Spencer Brown was born in Irvine, North Ayrshire, Scotland on 24 July 1997. His passion for martial arts began at the age of 6 when he trained and competed in Karate at the national level. When he was 15 years old, he started training in Muay Thai at the Rama Camp Gym after a friend introduced him to the sport.

In 2015, Brown was scouted by Yokkao UK promoter, Brian Calder and was given the opportunity to fight on the Yokkao 12 - 13 undercard.

The following year in 2016, Brown was signed on as a Yokkao Next Generation fighter. He moved to Bangkok on the invitation of Yokkao the same year, joining the Yokkao Training Center and training alongside Saenchai, Singdam, Manachai and Yodchai.

In September 2017, Brown officially joined the YOKKAO Fight Team, and made his debut on the official Yokkao event at YOKKAO 25 in Hong Kong.

In May 2017, Brown fought against Miguel Martinez in Spain for the ISKA European championship title. Brown won the fight via decision.

On 26 January 2019, Brown won the WBC Super-Lightweight European title against Italian fighter, Luca Roma at Yokkao 35 in Turin, Italy.

== Titles and accomplishments ==
- 2017 ISKA European Champion
- 2019 WBC Muay Thai European Super-Lightweight Champion

== Muay Thai record ==
Muay Thai record
Date	Result	Opponent	Event	Location	Method	Round	Time
2019-07-27	Draw	(Republic of Ireland) Stefan Korodi	YOKKAO 41	Dublin, Ireland	Decision	5	3:00
2019-05-25	Win	(Timor-Leste) Albert Xavier	YOKKAO 40	Sydney, Australia	KO	2	2:50
2019-03-09	Win	(Belarus) Maksim Petkevich	All Star Fight: World Soldier	Bangkok, Thailand	Decision	3	3:00
2019-01-26	Win	(Italy) Luca Roma	YOKKAO 35	Turin, Italy	Decision	5	3:00
Wins the WBC Muaythai European Super Lightweight title
2018-10-29	Win	(China) JI Duoyibu	YOKKAO 34	Hong Kong, China	Decision	3	3:00
2018-05-26	Loss	(Thailand) Singpayak PTJ	YOKKAO Next Generation	Sydney, Australia	Decision	5	3:00
2018-03-10	Win	(Scotland) Connor McNab	YOKKAO 30	Bolton, UK	Decision	5	3:00
2017-10-15	Win	(Scotland) Stewart Pringle	YOKKAO 27	Bolton, UK	Decision	5	3:00
2017-09-11	Win	(Hong Kong) Lui Chun Yin	YOKKAO 25	Hong Kong, China	Decision	3	3:00
2017-08-05	Loss	(China) Chenglong Zhang	EMLegend 22	Narathiwat, Thailand	Decision	3	3:00
2017-08-19	Win	(Thailand) Mongkolpetch	MX Muay Xtreme	Bangkok, Thailand	KO	1	2:30
2017-07-21	Win	(Thailand) Peemai Por Kobkua	MX Muay Xtreme	Bangkok, Thailand	KO	1	2:45
2017-05-14	Win	(Spain) Miguel Martinez	Only Muay Thai	Almeria, Spain	Decision	5	3:00
Wins the ISKA European 61kg title
2017-03-26	Loss	(Greece) George Mouzakitis	YOKKAO Next Generation	Bolton, UK	Decision	5	3:00
2017-02-03	Win	(Thailand) Lekkar Dabpong	MX Muay Xtreme	Bangkok, Thailand	KO	1	2:15
2016-10-28	Loss	(Hong Kong) Chan Chau Yin	YOKKAO 22	Hong Kong, China	Decision	3	3:00
2016-10-09	Win	(England) Louis Lee Scott	YOKKAO Next Generation	Bolton, UK	Decision	5	3:00
2016-07-31	Loss	(England) Cody Ditchev	Kiatphontip Promotion	Leeds, UK	Decision	5	2:00
2016-03-19	Win	(England) Adam Penkith	YOKKAO Next Generation	Bolton, UK	TKO	3	1:00
2015-12-05	Win	(Scotland) Euan Macintosh	MTB	Johnston, Scotland	Decision	5	3:00
2015-10-10	Loss	(Scotland) Sam Brunca	YOKKAO Next Generation	Bolton, UK	Decision	5	2:00

Legend: Win Loss Draw/No contest Notes
