= Yodchai YokkaoSaenchaiGym =

Thai boxer (born 1995)

Yodchai
- Born: April 9, 1995 (age 31); Uttaradit, Thailand
- Nationality: Thai
- Height: 1.70 m (5 ft 7 in)
- Weight: 64 kg (141 lb; 10 st 1 lb)
- Division: Lightweight
- Style: Muay Thai
- Stance: Orthodox
- Fighting out of: Bangkok, Thailand
- Team: YOKKAO Fight Team
- Teachers: Saenchai, Singdam
- Trainer: Kru Petchdam YOKKAO (Kru Jack)

Kickboxing record
- Total: 167
- Wins: 120
- Losses: 40
- Draws: 7
- Last updated on: May 9, 2019

Yodchai YokkaoSaenchaiGym is a Lightweight Muay Thai fighter from Thailand, currently fighting out of YOKKAO Training Center Bangkok. He is a WBC Muay Thai International champion.

== Biography ==
Yodchai was born in the northern Thai province of Uttaradit. He began training at 8 and fought shortly after. He soon moved to Lok Bor Kor gym in Singburi, training and fighting for many years before he was acquired by YOKKAO Fight Team in December, 2016.

On 26 January 2019, Yodchai fought against Italian fighter, Jonathan Astarita at Yokkao 35 in Turin, Italy for the WBC Lightweight International title. Yodchai won the fight by technical knockout after Astarita was unable to continue after round 3.

On 16 April 2016, Yodchai fought Jomhod Chor Ketweena in the Petchsupaphan promotion main event at Lumpinee stadium. The match ended in a draw and was awarded the “Fight of the Month” by Lumpinee stadium.

== Titles and accomplishments ==
- 2019 WBC Muay Thai International Lightweight Champion

== Muay Thai record ==
Muay Thai record
Date	Result	Opponent	Event	Location	Method	Round	Time
2019-04-16	draw	(Thailand) Jomhod Chor Ketweena	Lumpinee Stadium	Bangkok, Thailand	Decision	5	3:00
2019-01-26	Win	(Italy) Jonathan Astarita	YOKKAO 35	Turin, Italy	TKO	3	3:00
2018-12-23	Win	(Thailand) Por Uthai Sor Jor Piek Uthai	YOKKAO Next Generation	Phuket, Thailand	TKO	3	2:00
Wins the WBC Muaythai International Lightweight title

Legend: Win Loss Draw/No contest Notes
