= Manachai =

Fighter

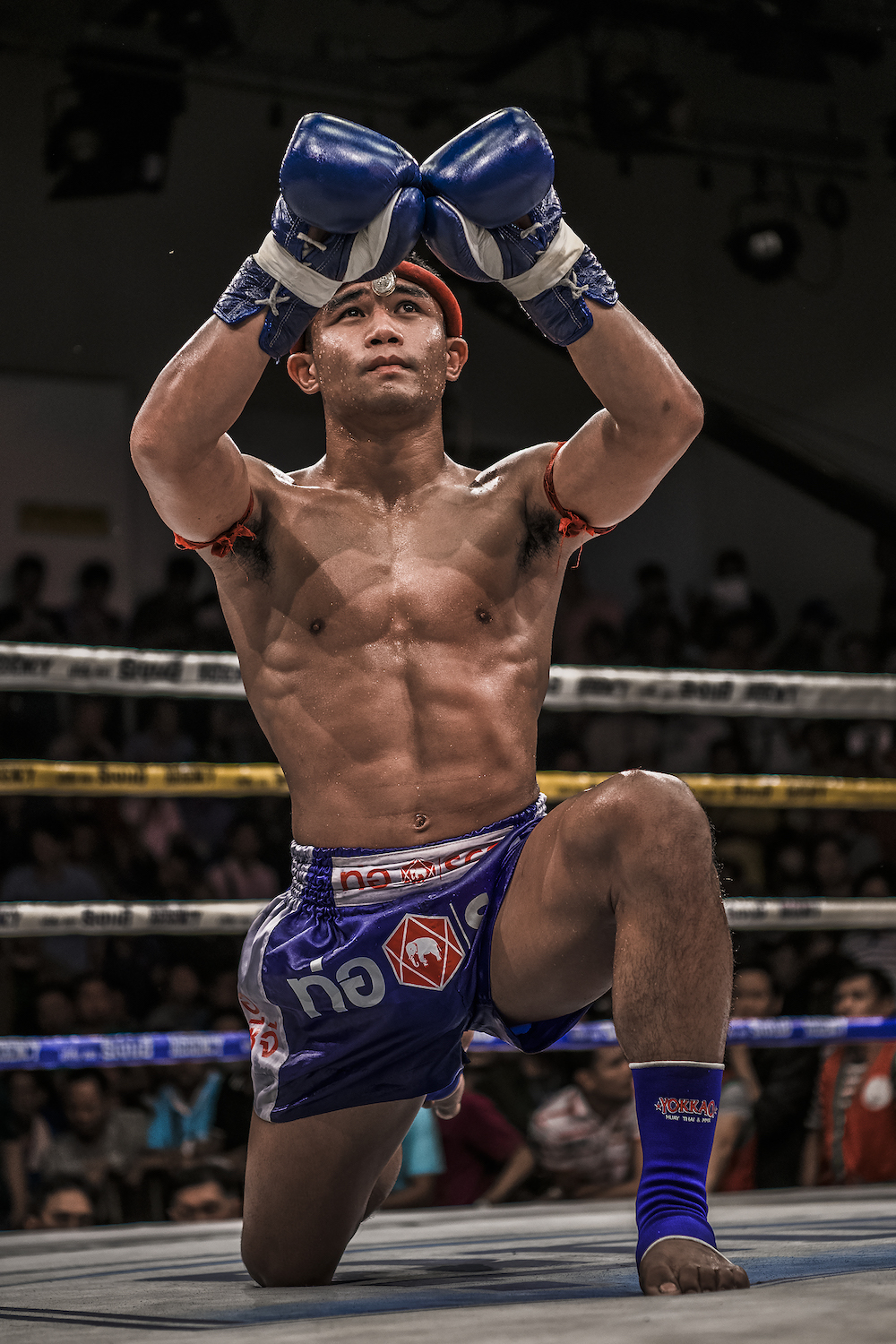
- Born: Jirapart Waiprakorn; October 20, 1996 (age 29)
- Nationality: Thai
- Height: 1.70 m (5 ft 7 in)
- Weight: 65 kg (143 lb; 10 st 3 lb)
- Division: Welterweight
- Style: Muay Thai
- Stance: Orthodox
- Fighting out of: Bangkok, Thailand
- Team: YOKKAO Fight Team
- Teachers: Saenchai, Singdam
- Trainer: Petchdam YOKKAO (Jack)

Kickboxing record
- Total: 304
- Wins: 210
- By knockout: 30
- Losses: 94
- Last updated on: May 10, 2019

Jirapart Waiprakorn (born October 20, 1996), known as Manachai, is a Muay Thai fighter and Former WMO Welterweight World Champion from Thailand. He was originally from Buriram, in the north-eastern Isaan region of Thailand, now fighting out of YOKKAOSaenchaiGym in Bangkok.

== Biography ==
=== Early career ===
Manachai started training and fighting at the age of 8. He won his first fight and was rewarded with 500 baht. The relatively large prize money motivated him to train in the sport full-time. He joined Kiatmoo9 Gym in Buriram, training with the camp's fighters like Singdam, Superlek and Rungnarai for many years.

During his early career he competed in the Isaan region and made his way to fighting at Lumpinee Stadium in Bangkok, during which he was ranked number one in his weight division at one point.

=== 2016 - Present ===
In April 2016, Manachai moved to the YOKKAO camp in Bangkok, training with Saenchai, Singdam and Pakorn amongst others.

In February 2017, CNN Money featured YOKKAO in a television documentary special showcasing young, successful businesses in Thailand. Manachai appeared on the program together with YOKKAO camp mates, Singdam and Saenchai.

After 2 wins at YOKKAO 17 and YOKKAO Next Generation Khorat in March and May 2016 respectively. Following this period, he had 2 unsuccessful attempts at winning the Toyota 8-man tournament, losing to Yodthuangton via decisions on both occasions. He also sustained losses at YOKKAO 21 to Australian Kurtis Staiti, as well as in Korat and Omnoi Stadium.

After a short break from training and competing, Manachai returned to the ring and went on a 9-win streak from July 2017. He kicked off the series of victories when he went up against former 2013 Rajadamnern champion, Kiatpetch Suanaharneekmai at the YOKKAO Next Generation event in Suraburi. Manachai outscored Kiatpetch to bring home the win.

On 20 August 2017, Manachai appeared on the inaugural All-star Fight promotion alongside YOKKAO teammate, Pakorn and Muay Thai star, Buakaw. On this occasion, he defeated Iranian fighter, Vahid Shahbazi, a veteran of the ring, via decision.

A month later, Manachai made his second Hong Kong appearance with YOKKAO 26 on 11 September winning a unanimous decision over his Spanish opponent, Carlos Araya.

On 30 September, Manachai returned to All-Star Fight in Bangkok fighting against a Laotian opponent, Noukhith Latsaphao. He defeated Noukhith a minute into the third round via an elbow KO.

Manachai continued his win streak at his next 2 appearances. The first on 17 November 2017 in Surin, Manachai won the fight in round 3 via low-kick KO. On 23 December, he returned to Lumpinee Stadium, winning the fight again via low-kick KO.

On 20 January 2018, he made his Italian debut on The Night of Kick and Punch promotion facing local fighter, Nuriel Glorian Cauli. He won the fight via referee stoppage in round 1.

On 18 February 2018, Manachai fought against Lumpinee Champion Pongsiri PKSaenchaiGym at Channel 7 stadium. The fight was originally set up for the Channel 7 147lbs title that was scrapped a day before the fight. Manachai outperformed his opponent in the decisive rounds 3 and 4 to take the win over decision.

On 24 March 2018, Manachai took on Attachai Tor Morsi at Siam Boxing Stadium broadcast live on Channel 3. Manachai ended the fight in round 1 and won via low-kick KO. The victory made it a 9-win streak for Manachai.

In April 2018, Manachai was ranked the #2 Welter weight ranked on Lumpinee Stadium, and #4 Welter weight on Rajadamnern Stadium by muaythai2000.com.

On 18 April 2018, Manachai took his 10th straight win when he returned to Italy for the Parabellum promotion against Christian Zahe. He won the fight over unanimous decision after 3 rounds.

On 29 April 2018, UK fighter Mo Abdurahman concluded Manachai's winning streak at YOKKAO Next Generation Southampton with a round-3 KO via right hook.

In May 2018, Manachai was announced as a member of the All Star Fight Dream Team that features other prominent fighters such as Buakaw Banchamek, Yodsanklai Fairtex, Superbon Banchamek, Saeksan Or. Kwanmuang and Jomthong Chuwatthana.

On 21 May 2018, Manachai faced Canadian fighter, Abdou Haddad on All Star Fight 4 held in Hong Kong. He won the fight via decision after 3 rounds, which was featured on Fox Sports Asia's Facebook page.

On 29 October 2018, Manachai took on Julio Lobo from Brazil for the WBC Muay Thai World Welterweight title at YOKKAO 34. He won the fight via decision and was crowned the new WBC welterweight champion at the Kowloon Bay International Trade & Exhibition Centre.

On 17 December 2019, Manachai fought Trithep LSM99Max for the WMO world championship title at Lumpinee Stadium. He won the fight via round-4 KO to be crowned the new WMO world champion 147lbs.

== Titles and accomplishments ==
- WBC Muaythai
  - 2018 WBC Muay Thai Welterweight 147lbs. World Champion
- World Muaythai Organization
  - 2019 WMO World Muay Thai Organization Welterweight 147lbs World Champion

== Muay Thai record ==
Muay Thai record
2020-01-25	Win	(Italy) Pasquale Amoroso	YOKKAO 46	Turin, Italy	TKO (Injury)	3	1:27
2019-12-17	Win	(Thailand) Traithep LSM99MAX	Lumpinee Stadium	Bangkok, Thailand	KO	4	2:15
Wins the WMO World Muay Thai Organization 147lbs Welterweight World Title
2019-11-30	Win	(Italy) Alessio D'Angelo	YOKKAO Fight Night	Bologna, Italy	KO	3	2:00
2019-07-13	Loss	(Brazil) Julio Lobo	Lumpinee Stadium	Bangkok, Thailand	KO (Elbow)	4	0:20
2019-04-30	Loss	(France) Rafi Bohic	Lumpinee Stadium	Bangkok, Thailand	KO (Elbow)	4	2:01
2019-04-03	Win	(Thailand) Starboy Saengsingyut Gym	YOKKAO Next Generation	Phuket, Thailand	KO (Low kick)	2	2:30
2019-01-26	Loss	(Italy) Luca Falco	YOKKAO 36	Turin, Italy	TKO (Injured ankle)	4	1:45
2018-12-23	Win	(Thailand) Thanungoen Por Lakboon	YOKKAO Next Generation	Phuket, Thailand	KO (Low kick)	1	2:15
2018-10-29	Win	(Brazil) Julio Lobo	YOKKAO 34	Hong Kong, China	Decision	5	3:00
Wins the WBC Muaythai World Welterweight title
2018-09-30	Win	(Thailand) Phetnarin	YOKKAO Next Generation	Phuket, Thailand	KO (Low kick)	4	0:10
2018-07-06	Win	(Spain) Nauzet Trujillo	All-Star Fight 5	Prague, Czech Republic	Decision	3	3:00
2018-05-21	Win	(Canada) Abdou Haddad	All-Star Fight 4	Hong Kong	Decision	3	3:00
2018-04-29	Loss	(United Kingdom) Mo Abdurahman	YOKKAO Next Generation	Southampton, United Kingdom	KO (Right hook)	3	2:00
2018-04-18	Win	(Italy) Christian Zahe	Parabellum	Milan, Italy	Decision	3	3:00
2018-03-24	Win	(Thailand) Attachai Tor Morsi	Channel 3	Bangkok, Thailand	KO (Low kick)	1	2:45
2018-02-18	Win	(Thailand) Pongsiri P.K.Saenchaimuaythaigym	Channel 7 Stadium	Bangkok, Thailand	Decision	5	3:00
2018-01-20	Win	(Italy) Nuriel Glorian Cauli	Night of Kick and Punch	Milan, Italy	TKO	1	2:35
2017-12-23	Win	(Thailand) Famamchai Por Mongkolsub	Lumpinee Stadium	Bangkok, Thailand	KO (Low kick)	4	0:20
2017-11-17	Win	(Thailand) Yordkosol	YOKKAO - PK Promotion	Surin, Thailand	KO (Low kick)	3	0:50
2017-09-30	Win	(Laos) Noukhith Latsaphao	All-Star Fight 2	Bangkok, Thailand	KO	3	1:00
2017-09-30	Win	(Spain) Carlos Araya	YOKKAO 26	Hong Kong	Decision	3	3:00
2017-08-20	Win	(Iran) Vahid Shahbazi	All-Star Fight	Bangkok, Thailand	Decision	3	3:00
2017-07-18	Win	(Thailand) Kiatpetch Suanaharneekmai	YOKKAO Next Generation	Saraburi, Thailand	Decision	5	3:00
2017-05-05	Loss	(Thailand) Saksongkarm Poptheeratham	Rangsit Stadium	Pathum Thani, Thailand	Decision	5	3:00
2017-02-17	Win	(Thailand) Rongphichit Sitkongdej	Rangsit Stadium	Pathum Thani, Thailand	TKO	4	2:40
2017-01-27	Loss	(Thailand) Yodthuangton Petchyindee	Toyota 8-Man Tournament	Phitsanulok, Thailand	Decision	3	3:00
2016-12-30	Win	(Thailand) Rungnapa Pinsinchai	YOKKAO Next Generation	Sisaket, Thailand	Decision	5	3:00
2016-10-28	Loss	(Australia) Kurtis Staiti	YOKKAO 21	Hong Kong	Decision	3	3:00
2016-10-08	Win	(United Kingdom) Panicos Yusuf	YOKKAO 20	Bolton, England	Decision	5	3:00
2016-08-27	Loss	(Thailand) Yodthuangton Petchyindee	Toyota 8-Man Tournament	Khon Kaen, Thailand	Decision	3	3:00
2016-08-27	Win	(Brazil) Gabriel Lima	Toyota 8-Man Tournament	Khon Kaen, Thailand	Decision	3	3:00
2016-08-27	Win	(Thailand) Aranachai Kiatpattarapan	Toyota 8-Man Tournament	Khon Kaen, Thailand	Decision	3	3:00
2016-07-28	Loss	(Thailand) Rungrat	YOKKAO Next Generation	Surin, Thailand	Decision	5	3:00
2016-06-18	Loss	(Thailand) Phonek Mor.Phuwana	Omnoi Stadium	Bangkok, Thailand	Decision	5	3:00
2016-05-31	Win	(Thailand) Jomwo Sitsan	YOKKAO Next Generation	Korat, Thailand	KO (Elbow)	3	1:30
2016-05-22	Loss	(Thailand) Yodthuangton Petchyindee	Rajadamnern Stadium	Bangkok, Thailand	Decision	5	3:00
2016-03-19	Win	(United Kingdom) Luke Turner	YOKKAO 17	Bolton, England	TKO	2	3:00
2016-01-23	Win	(Thailand) Kiangkrai Tor Silachai	Omnoi Stadium	Bangkok, Thailand	Decision	5	3:00
2015-12-27	Loss	(Thailand) Sibmean Sitchefboontham	Rajadamnern Stadium	Bangkok, Thailand	Decision	5	3:00

Legend: Win Loss Draw/No contest Notes
