= Yokkao =

Muay Thai brand based in Thailand

YOKKAO
- YOKKAO Boxing
- Company type: Private
- Industry: Muay Thai, Kickboxing Brand
- Founded: 1 January 2010; 16 years ago in Bangkok, Thailand
- Headquarters: Bang Sao Thong District, Samut Prakan, Thailand
- Area served: Worldwide
- Key people: Philip Villa (Founder); Stefania Picelli (CEO)
- Products: Boxing equipment, sporting equipment, clothing, accessories
- Services: Manufacturer, Muay Thai Events, fighter management
- Website: yokkao.com

Yokkao Boxing is a Muay Thai brand headquartered in Bangkok, Thailand.

The name "Yokkao," derived from the Thai word for "white jade," stands for "strength and connections".

== History ==
YOKKAO was founded in Bangkok on 1 January 2010 by Philip Villa. The company initially produced Muay Thai shorts and training equipment. In February 2011, the company established the YOKKAO Fight Team, a sponsorship program for Muay Thai fighters around the world. Early members included Buakaw Banchamek, Yoddecha Sityodtong, Jordan Watson, Sudsakorn Sor Klinmee, Saenchai P.K. Saenchai, Dzhabar Askerov, Cedric Muller and Liam Harrison. YOKKAO also collaborated with established training camps, including Sityodtong Gym, 13 Coins and Pro Pramuk Gym.

In November 2011, YOKKAO began promoting fight events. Its first major international event, YOKKAO Extreme, was held on 21 January 2012 at the Forum di Assago in Milan, Italy.

On 11 October 2014, YOKKAO introduced championship titles at events YOKKAO 10 and YOKKAO 11 in the 65 kg and 70 kg weight classes. Pakorn won the 65 kg title by defeating Greg Wootton, while Jordan Watson won the 70 kg title by knockout against Mickael Piscitello.

YOKKAO has held fight events in multiple countries, including Italy, the United Kingdom, Hong Kong, China, Argentina, Australia, Mexico, and Thailand.

The company signed more fighters into its team over the years including Singdam Kiatmoo9, Pakorn P.K. Saenchai Muaythaigym, Tetsuya Yamato, Manachai, Yodchai, Petpanomrung Kiatmuu9, and Superlek Kiatmuu9.

On 1 January 2019, the company introduced an updated logo design.

In November 2020, YOKKAO founder, Philip Villa announced over social media the signing of Rodtang Jitmuangnon, Nuenglanlek Jitmuangnon and Sakaengam Jitmuangnon under a 3-year sponsorship deal.

In February 2021, YOKKAO signed female Muay Thai champions Duangdawnoi Looksaikongdin and Aida Looksaikongdin as well as transgender fighter, Nong Rose Baan Charoensuk.

In 2021, YOKKAO debuted a streetwear collection at Milan Fashion Week, presenting its first full apparel range alongside other international brands; fashion media cited the collection as an example of a combat-sports label expanding into lifestyle and streetwear.

In 2023, YOKKAO announced the launch of its MMA division and a partnership with American Top Team.

In 2024, YOKKAO announced a broadcasting partnership with New Power Group, covering more than 50 Muay Thai events from Rajadamnern Stadium for 2025, as well as a collaboration with musician Wiz Khalifa.

In late 2025, the company entered a partnership with Mexico Fight League (MFL), becoming the official gear and apparel provider.

In January 2026, YOKKAO was reported to have more than 45 million monthly video views across its social media channels, with over 500 million yearly views.

=== Business model ===
YOKKAO operates a vertically integrated business model combining manufacturing, direct-to-consumer sales, wholesale distribution, athlete sponsorship, training facilities, and event promotion.

The company manufactures its products at its production facility in Samut Prakan, Thailand. Finished goods are sold primarily through its e-commerce platforms and distributed via warehouses in Asia, the United States, the United Kingdom, and Europe.

In addition to product sales, YOKKAO operates and licenses training facilities. The company runs official YOKKAO Training Centers in Thailand and maintains a network of affiliated gyms through partnerships with local operators. These affiliated locations operate in countries including Australia, Canada, Argentina, the United Kingdom, the Republic of San Marino, Croatia, Bahrain, Hong Kong, China, South Korea, Malaysia, and Thailand.

YOKKAO also generates revenue through the promotion of combat sports events, athlete sponsorship agreements, and the organization of training seminars and workshops aimed at international practitioners of Muay Thai.

== Past events ==
#	Event	Date	Venue	Location
–	YOKKAO - New Power Group	Every Wednesday (ongoing)	Rajadamnern Stadium	Bangkok, Thailand
156–164	YOKKAO - New Power Group	January–March 2026 (9 events)	Rajadamnern Stadium	Bangkok, Thailand
105–155	YOKKAO - New Power Group	January–December 2025 (51 events)	Rajadamnern Stadium	Bangkok, Thailand
90–104	YOKKAO - New Power Group	4 September–15 December 2024 (15 events)	Rajadamnern Stadium	Bangkok, Thailand
89	YOKKAO 50	8 August 2021	University of Bolton Stadium	(United Kingdom) Bolton, England
88	YOKKAO 49	8 August 2021	University of Bolton Stadium	(United Kingdom) Bolton, England
87	YOKKAO in da Club	25 October 2020	The Big Club	Turin, Italy
86	YOKKAO 48	7 March 2020	University of Bolton Stadium	(United Kingdom) Bolton, England
85	YOKKAO 47	7 March 2020	University of Bolton Stadium	(United Kingdom) Bolton, England
84	YOKKAO Next Generation & Kids	7 March 2020	University of Bolton Stadium	(United Kingdom) Bolton, England
83	YOKKAO 46	25 January 2020	PalaRuffini	Turin, Italy
82	YOKKAO 45	25 January 2020	PalaRuffini	Turin, Italy
81	YOKKAO Next Generation	25 January 2020	PalaRuffini	Turin, Italy
80	YOKKAO Kids	25 January 2020	PalaRuffini	Turin, Italy
79	YOKKAO Fight Night	30 November 2019	Via Caselle	Bologna, Italy
78	YOKKAO Kids	30 November 2019	Palasport di Sant'Agnello	Naples, Italy
77	YOKKAO 44	26 October 2019	University of Bolton Stadium	(United Kingdom) Bolton, England
76	YOKKAO 43	26 October 2019	University of Bolton Stadium	(United Kingdom) Bolton, England
75	YOKKAO 42	27 July 2019	National Basketball Arena	(Republic of Ireland) Dublin, Ireland
74	YOKKAO 41	27 July 2019	National Basketball Arena	(Republic of Ireland) Dublin, Ireland
72	YOKKAO 40	25 May 2019	Australian Technology Park	Sydney, Australia
71	YOKKAO 39	25 May 2019	Australian Technology Park	Sydney, Australia
70	YOKKAO Next Generation Phuket	3 April 2019	Bangla Boxing Stadium	Phuket, Thailand
69	YOKKAO 38	23 March 2019	University of Bolton Stadium	(United Kingdom) Bolton, England
68	YOKKAO 37	23 March 2019	University of Bolton Stadium	(United Kingdom) Bolton, England
67	YOKKAO Next Generation Kids	27 January 2019	PalaRuffini	Turin, Italy
66	YOKKAO 36	26 January 2019	PalaRuffini	Turin, Italy
65	YOKKAO 35	26 January 2019	PalaRuffini	Turin, Italy
64	YOKKAO Next Generation Phuket	23 December 2018	Bangla Boxing Stadium	Phuket, Thailand
63	YOKKAO Next Generation Kids	16 December 2018	Turin	Turin, Italy
62	YOKKAO Next Generation	16 December 2018	Turin	Turin, Italy
61	YOKKAO Next Generation	1 December 2018	Bologna	Bologna, Italy
60	YOKKAO 34	29 October 2018	Hong Kong	Hong Kong, China
59	YOKKAO 33	29 October 2018	Hong Kong	Hong Kong, China
58	YOKKAO 32	13 October 2018	University of Bolton Stadium	(United Kingdom) Bolton, England
57	YOKKAO 31	13 October 2018	University of Bolton Stadium	(United Kingdom) Bolton, England
56	YOKKAO Next Generation Phuket	30 September 2018	Bangla Boxing Stadium	Phuket, Thailand
55	YOKKAO Next Generation Scotland	22 September 2018	On-X Linwood Sports Centre	(United Kingdom) Paisley, Scotland
54	YOKKAO Next Generation Kids	21 July 2018	Barnsley Metrodome	(United Kingdom) Barnsley, England
53	YOKKAO Next Generation Sydney	26 May 2018	Marrickville Town Hall	Sydney, Australia
52	YOKKAO Next Generation Kids	26 May 2018	Barnsley Metrodome	(United Kingdom) Barnsley, England
51	YOKKAO Next Generation Southampton	29 April 2018	Oceana Southampton	(United Kingdom) Southampton, England
50	YOKKAO UK Open 2018	14 April 2018	Barnsley Metrodome	(United Kingdom) Barnsley, England
49	YOKKAO Next Generation Kids	31 March 2018	Grangemouth Sports Complex	(United Kingdom) Paisley, Scotland
48	YOKKAO 30	10 March 2018	Macron Stadium	(United Kingdom) Bolton, England
47	YOKKAO 29	10 March 2018	Macron Stadium	(United Kingdom) Bolton, England
46	YOKKAO Next Generation Scotland	28 February 2018	On-X Linwood Sports Centre	(United Kingdom) Paisley, Scotland
45	YOKKAO Next Generation Kids	10 February 2018	Barnsley Metrodome	(United Kingdom) Barnsley, England
44	YOKKAO Next Generation Kids	26 November 2017	Barnsley Metrodome	(United Kingdom) Barnsley, England
43	YOKKAO 28	15 October 2017	Macron Stadium	(United Kingdom) Bolton, England
42	YOKKAO 27	15 October 2017	Macron Stadium	(United Kingdom) Bolton, England
41	YOKKAO 26	28 September 2017	Hong Kong	Hong Kong, China
40	YOKKAO 25	28 September 2017	Hong Kong	Hong Kong, China
39	YOKKAO 24	25 March 2017	Macron Stadium	(United Kingdom) Bolton, England
38	YOKKAO 23	25 March 2017	Macron Stadium	(United Kingdom) Bolton, England
37	YOKKAO 22	28 October 2016	Hong Kong	Hong Kong, China
36	YOKKAO 21	28 October 2016	Hong Kong	Hong Kong, China
35	YOKKAO 20	8 October 2016	Macron Stadium	(United Kingdom) Bolton, England
34	YOKKAO 19	8 October 2016	Macron Stadium	(United Kingdom) Bolton, England
33	YOKKAO Next Generation UK	8 October 2016	Macron Stadium	(United Kingdom) Bolton, England
32	YOKKAO Next Generation Thailand	16 September 2016	Sisaket Boxing Stadium	Sisaket, Thailand
31	YOKKAO Next Generation Uruguay	16 November 2016	Colegio San Juan Bautista	Montevideo, Uruguay
30	YOKKAO Next Generation Mexico	24 September 2016	Arena Xalapa	Xalapa, Mexico
29	YOKKAO Next Generation Melbourne	27 August 2016	Meat Market	Melbourne, Australia
28	YOKKAO Next Generation Thailand	29 July 2016	BIG C Surin	Surin, Thailand
27	YOKKAO Next Generation Thailand	31 May 2016	Khorat Yamo	Khorat, Thailand
26	YOKKAO Next Generation Mexico	27 May 2016	Arena Xalapa	Xalapa, Mexico
25	YOKKAO Next Generation Sydney	21 May 2016	Srg YOKKAO Training Center	Sydney, Australia
24	YOKKAO Next Generation Thailand	30 March 2016	MBK	Bangkok, Thailand
23	YOKKAO Next Generation Thailand	23 March 2016	MBK	Bangkok, Thailand
22	YOKKAO Next Generation Thailand	22 March 2016	MBK	Bangkok, Thailand
21	YOKKAO 18	19 March 2016	Macron Stadium	(United Kingdom) Bolton, England
20	YOKKAO 17	19 March 2016	Macron Stadium	(United Kingdom) Bolton, England
19	YOKKAO Next Generation UK	19 March 2016	Macron Stadium	(United Kingdom) Bolton, England
18	YOKKAO Next Generation Thailand	17 March 2016	MBK	Bangkok, Thailand
17	YOKKAO Next Generation Thailand	9 March 2016	MBK	Bangkok, Thailand
16	YOKKAO 16	13 November 2015	Metropolitano	Rosario, Argentina
15	YOKKAO 15	10 October 2015	Macron Stadium	(United Kingdom) Bolton, England
14	YOKKAO 14	10 October 2015	Macron Stadium	(United Kingdom) Bolton, England
13	YOKKAO 13	21 March 2015	Macron Stadium	(United Kingdom) Bolton, England
12	YOKKAO 12	21 March 2015	Macron Stadium	(United Kingdom) Bolton, England
11	YOKKAO 11	11 October 2014	Reebok Stadium	(United Kingdom) Bolton, England
10	YOKKAO 10	11 October 2014	Reebok Stadium	(United Kingdom) Bolton, England
9	YOKKAO 9	24 May 2014	Xinyang Football Stadium	Xinyang, China
8	YOKKAO 8	29 January 2014	Macron Stadium	(United Kingdom) Bolton, England
7	YOKKAO 7	19 February 2014	Pattaya World Boxing Stadium	Pattaya, Thailand
6	YOKKAO 6	3 January 2014	Pattaya World Boxing Stadium	Pattaya, Thailand
5	YOKKAO 5	15 November 2013	Pattaya World Boxing Stadium	Pattaya, Thailand
4	YOKKAO EXTREME 2013	26 January 2013	Forum d'Assago	Milan, Italy
3	Muay Thai Combat Mania	30 December 2013	Pattaya World Boxing Stadium	Pattaya, Thailand
2	Muay Thai Combat Mania	14 July 2012	Piazza S. Martino	Riccione, Italy
1	YOKKAO EXTREME	21 January 2012	Forum d'Assago	Milan, Italy

== Champions ==
=== Diamond champions ===
Weight	Champion	Since
66 kg	(Thailand) Saenchai	25 January 2020

=== Current champions ===
Weight	Champion	Since	Title defenses
-	-	-	-
-	-	-	-

=== -65kg ===
#	Date	Champion	Event	Venue	Notes
5	15 October 2017	(United Kingdom) Liam Harrison	YOKKAO 27	Macron Stadium	defeated (Germany) Kevin Burmester in title defense (round 2 KO by leg kick)
4	25 March 2017	(United Kingdom) Liam Harrison	YOKKAO 24	Macron Stadium	defeated (France) Rayan Mekki in title defense (round 3 TKO by ref. stoppage)
3	19 March 2016	(United Kingdom) Liam Harrison	YOKKAO 17	Macron Stadium	defeated (Japan) Tetsuya Yamato over vacant title (previous title holder Pakorn lost the belt after 3 straight losses) (split decision)
2	21 March 2015	(Thailand) Pakorn PKSaenchaimuaythaigym	YOKKAO 13	Macron Stadium	defeated (United Kingdom) Liam Harrison in title defense (unanimous decision)
1	11 October 2014	(Thailand) Pakorn PKSaenchaimuaythaigym	YOKKAO 11	Macron Stadium	defeated (United Kingdom) Greg Wootton to be crowned inaugural YOKKAO world champion (unanimous decision)

=== -70kg ===
#	Date	Champion	Event	Venue	Notes
5	15 October 2017	(United Kingdom) Jordan Watson	YOKKAO 28	Macron Stadium	defeated (Thailand) Pongsiri PKSaenchaimuaythaigym in title defense (round 2 KO by head kick)
4	25 March 2017	(United Kingdom) Jordan Watson	YOKKAO 23	Macron Stadium	defeated (Thailand) Sorgraw Petchyindee in title defense (unanimous decision)
3	19 March 2016	(United Kingdom) Jordan Watson	YOKKAO 18	Macron Stadium	defeated (Sweden) Sanny Dahlbeck to regain title (unanimous decision)
2	21 March 2015	(Sweden) Sanny Dahlbeck	YOKKAO 12	Macron Stadium	defeated (United Kingdom) Jordan Watson to be crowned new YOKKAO World champion (round 4 TKO by 3 knockdowns)
1	11 October 2014	(United Kingdom) Jordan Watson	YOKKAO 10	Macron Stadium	defeated (France) Mickaël Piscitello to be crowned inaugural YOKKAO world champion (round 3 TKO leg injury)

== Training center ==
YOKKAO Training Center Bangkok is the official YOKKAO gym located in the downtown of Bangkok, Thailand. It was opened in 2016 when it became the home and training camp of the YOKKAO Thailand Fight Team. The gym is also opened to the public for training.

YOKKAO Training Center Bangkok has hosted professional fighters and celebrities for Muay Thai training including UK Muay Thai fighter, Liam Harrison, Joe Jonas and Cole Whittle of American pop band DNCE, and fashion model Mia Kang.

== Fight team ==
- (Thailand) Singdam YOKKAOSaenchaiGym
- (Thailand) Yodchai YOKKAOSaenchaiGym
- (Thailand) Superlek Kiatmuu9
- (Thailand) Petpanomrung Kiatmuu9
- (Thailand) Rodtang Jitmuangnon
- (Thailand) Nuenglanlek Jitmuangnon
- (Thailand) Sakaengam Jitmuangnon
- (United Kingdom) Liam Harrison
- (United Kingdom) Spencer Brown
- (Japan) Tetsuya Yamato

== Agency fighters ==
- (Thailand) Singdam
- (Thailand) Yodchai
- (Thailand) Manachai
- (Thailand) Superlek Kiatmuu9
- (Thailand) Petpanomrung Kiatmuu9
- (Thailand) Rodtang Jitmuangnon
- (Thailand) Nuenglanlek Jitmuangnon
- (Thailand) Sakaengam Jitmuangnon
- (United Kingdom) Spencer Brown

== Notable alumni ==
- (Thailand) Buakaw Banchamek
- (Thailand) Saenchai
- (Thailand) Singdam Kiatmuu9
- (Thailand) Sudsakorn Sor Klinmee
- (Thailand) Yodsanklai Fairtex
- (Thailand) Pakorn PKSaenchaimuaythaigym
- (Thailand) Superlek Kiatmuu9
- (Thailand) Manachai
- (Thailand) Kem Sitsongpeenong
- (Thailand) Sitthichai Sitsongpeenong
- (Thailand) Phetmorakot Wor Sangprapai
- (Thailand) Rungravee Sasiprapa
- (Thailand) Aikpracha Meenayothin
- (United Kingdom) Liam Harrison
- (United Kingdom) Daniel McGowan
- (United Kingdom) Jordan Watson
- (United Kingdom) Spencer Brown
- (United Kingdom) Tim Thomas (kickboxer)
- (France) Fabio Pinca
- (France) Houcine Bennoui
- (France) Karim Bennoui
- (France) Mickaël Piscitello
- (Italy) Giorgio Petrosyan
- (Italy) Armen Petrosyan
- (Suriname) Marco Piqué
- (Sweden) Sanny Dahlbeck
- (Netherlands) Andy Souwer
- (Spain) Abraham Roqueñi
- (Bosnia and Herzegovina) Ognjen Topic
- (Russia) Dzhabar Askerov
- (Japan) Tetsuya Yamato
- (China) Yi Long
- (China) Qiu Jianliang
- (China) Fang Bian
- (Russia) Dzhabar Askerov
- (Australia) Frank Giorgi
- (United Kingdom) Jonathan Haggerty
- (Republic of Ireland) Craig Coakley

== See also ==
- List of fitness wear brands
- List of companies of Thailand
