= Saenchai =

Thai professional Muay Thai fighter and former boxer

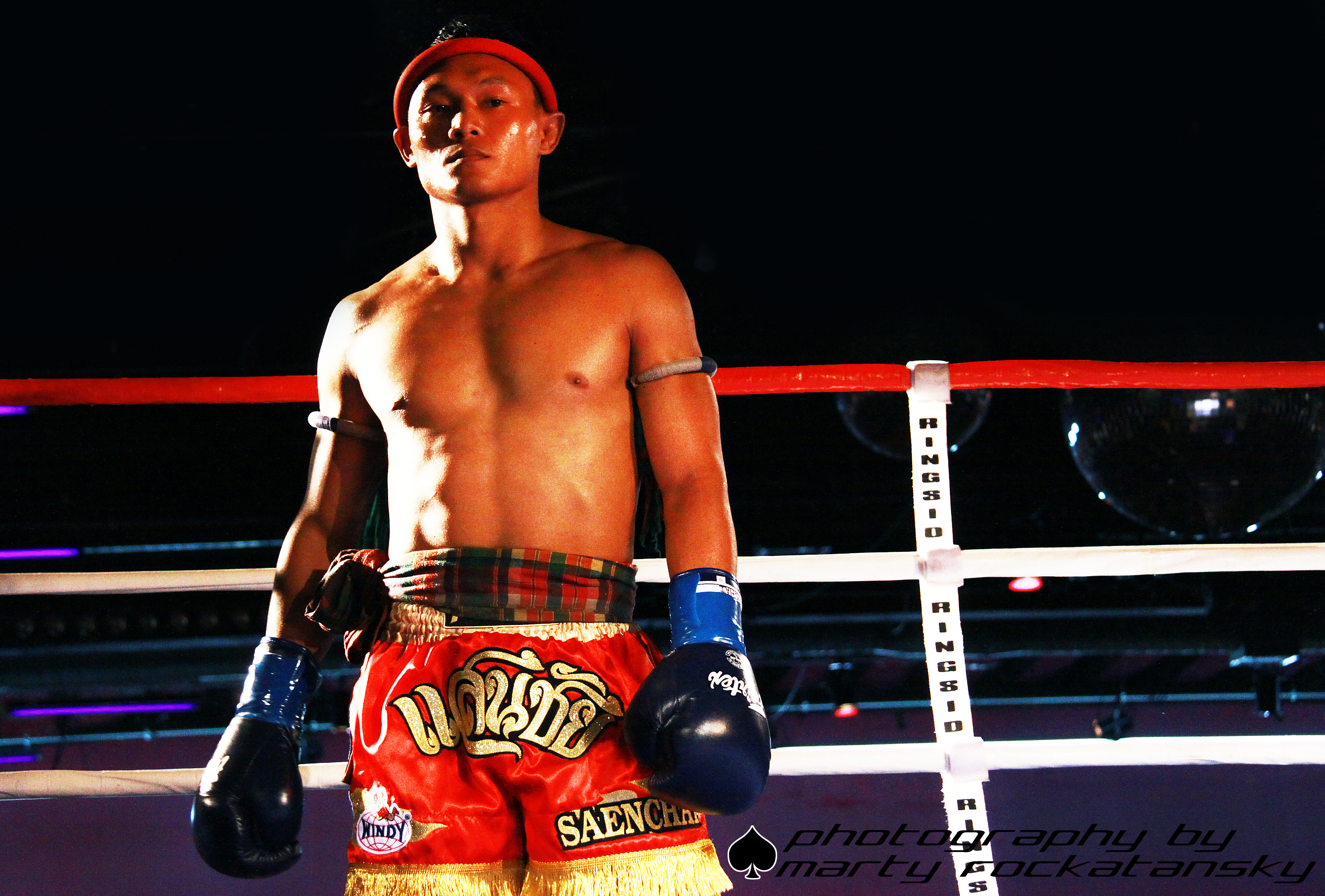
- Saenchai in 2010
- Born: Suphachai Saepong; July 30, 1980 (age 46); Kosum Phisai, Maha Sarakham, Thailand
- Native name: ศุภชัย แสนพงษ์
- Other names: Saenchai Sor.Kingstar (แสนชัย ส.คิงส์สตาร์); Saenchai P.K. Saenchai Muaythaigym; Saenchai Sinbimuaythai; Saenchai Sor. Khamsing (แสนชัย ส.คำสิงห์); Sangpetch Patanakangym
- Nickname: Ultimate Boxer from Sarakham (โคตรมวยสารคาม)
- Height: 165 cm (5 ft 5 in)
- Division: Light Flyweight; Flyweight; Super Flyweight; Bantamweight; Super Bantamweight; Featherweight; Super Featherweight; Lightweight; Light Welterweight; Welterweight; Super Welterweight
- Reach: 168 cm (66 in)
- Style: Muay Thai (Muay Femur), Muay Boran, Boxing
- Stance: Southpaw
- Fighting out of: Bangkok, Thailand
- Team: Sor.Kingstar (1988-1994); Jocky Gym (1994-2003); Sor.Khamsing (2003-2006); 13 Coins Resort (2006-2010); Sinbi Muay Thai (2010-2012); P.K.Saenchai Muay Thai (2013 - Present)
- Years active: 1988–present

Professional boxing record
- Total: 5
- Wins: 5
- By knockout: 2

Kickboxing record
- Total: 385
- Wins: 329
- By knockout: 43
- Losses: 49
- Draws: 7

Other information
- Notable students: Manachai
- Boxing record from BoxRec

Suphachai Saepong (Thai: ศุภชัย แสนพงษ์; born July 30, 1980), known professionally as Saenchai (Thai: แสนชัย), is a Thai professional Muay Thai fighter and former professional boxer. He is a former six-time Lumpinee Stadium champion across four divisions as well as the 1999 and 2008 Sports Writers Association of Thailand Fighter of the Year. Nicknamed the "Ultimate Boxer from Sarakham", he is often regarded as one of the greatest and most talented fighters in the history of Muay Thai.

Saenchai would often give up weight to find worthy opponents in Thailand, and from 2003 to 2014 only lost two times in Thailand when the weights were equal, with all other losses happening when he was forced to have a weight disadvantage to make the fights more equal. Since 2010 he has fought 88 times in 15 countries and is perhaps the most active international fighter. He is known for his excellent head movement, defensive footwork, unconventional kicks, and jumping attacks. His speed, athleticism, and the large variety in his unorthodox arsenal made him an exceptionally difficult opponent to prepare for. Incorporating Muay Boran style kicks and manoeuvres, he is known as a showman. He retired from serious competition in Thailand in 2014 and now solely competes in showcase fights around the world against foreign, usually bigger opponents. Upon retiring from competition on the Thai circuit he was still able to make 130 pounds, with his final fight being forced to make 129 pounds.

Since 2014, Saenchai has frequently competed at the Thai Fight promotion, a Thailand-based promotion. He has often been the headliner at more recent Thai Fight events and has won five King's Cup titles with the promotion at 67 kg and 70 kg. He holds the promotion's records for most titles with 5 and all-time wins with 52. As a professional boxer, he fought in the Featherweight division and retired with an undefeated record. Outside his competitive fighting career, Saenchai has appeared in films and documentaries such as Yamada: The Samurai of Ayothaya (2010) and Lumpinee (2018).

== Biography ==
=== Early career ===
Saenchai started learning Muay Thai when he was 8 years old. He decided to start learning Muay Thai in Jocky gym when his friend's elder brother received a prize after a bout. He debuted after training for only a week, and he won his first bout by decision receiving 30 Baht (≒$1).

He started fighting in Bangkok when he was 14 years old, then transferred to Kamsing gym owned by Somluck Kamsing. Kamsing paid 300,000 Baht as a transfer fee. This is the reason Saenchai's ring name was Saenchai Sor.Khamsing (แสนชัย ส.คำสิงห์).

In 1997, at age 16, Saenchai won the title of Lumpinee stadium championship at super flyweight. When he was 18, he won the title of Lumpinee stadium championship at bantamweight.

=== Turning to boxing ===
In 2002, Saenchai turned to boxing. He debuted as "Suphachai Saenpong" at featherweight. He fought against Rud 4K Kevkatchewon from Philippines to challenge for the vacant interim title of PABA on November 27, 2003, and he won the title by unanimous decision. In January 2004, he retained his PABA title against Rud.

In 2004, he decided to go back to Muay Thai again.

=== Discord with Khamsing ===
Saenchai traveled to Japan on two occasions for competitions, with the consent of Khamsing each time. A disagreement arose during plans for a third visit, which Khamsing opposed. Despite this, Saenchai went to Japan with fighters from another gym. As a result, their professional relationship deteriorated, leading Saenchai to join Kingstar gym. Following the move, Kingstar gym compensated Khamsing with a transfer fee of 300,000 Baht.

On July 3, 2006, Saenchai fought against Sang-Soo Lim from Korea in Japan. Saenchai was going to fight against Shinya Ishige but he was replaced two weeks earlier as he had been injured during training. Lim was 21 cm taller and 10 kg heavier than Saenchai but Saenchai knocked out Lim in 2R with a right hook.

On July 3, 2009, Saenchai fought against two Muay Thai fighters in the single bout at Lumpinee stadium. During 1 to 3 round, he fought against Petchboonchu FA Group. Petchboonchu tried to attack aggressively at 1R, but Saenchai carried throughout his stamina-saving style and broke Petchboonchu's balance several times. During 4 to 5 round, Saenchai fought against Sagetdao Petpayathai. Saenchai controlled his critical distance with front-kicks and middle-kicks and he threw telling blows more than Sakeddaow did. The referee announced Saenchai's victory with unanimous decision after 5R.

=== Winning world title ===
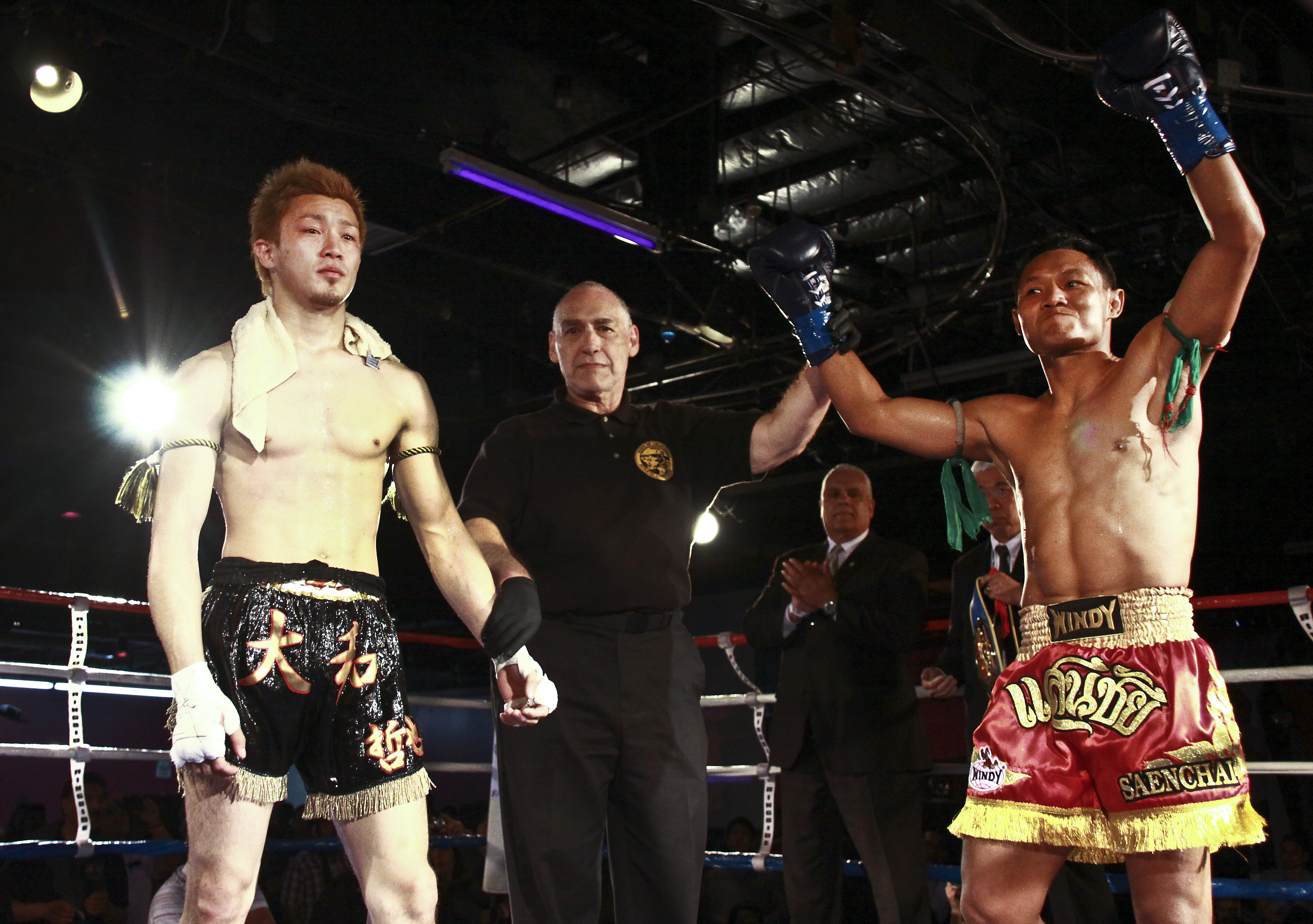
Saenchai vs Tetsuya Yamato in March 2010

On March 14, 2010, Saenchai fought against Tetsuya Yamato from Japan to challenge the vacant world lightweight title sanctioned by Muay Thai Association of America (MTAA) in Los Angeles. Saenchai knocked out Yamato with left high kick at 1R, and won the MTAA title.

=== Career highlights ===
In 2011, Saenchai was signed by Yokkao founder, Philip Villa as a sponsored fighter of the Yokkao Fight Team. In the same year, Saenchai led the Muay Thai Combat Fan Expo in Rimini, Italy with Buakaw Banchamek, Sudsakorn Sor Klinmee, Dzhabar Askerov and many others.

On January 21, 2012, Saenchai fought at Yokkao Extreme 2012 in front of 12,000 attendees. He lost for the first time against a European in Muay Thai rules. The fight took place in Milan Italy against the foreign Thai boxer, Fabio Pinca. Saenchai had beaten Pinca years earlier. Despite the 12 kg weight difference, Saenchai put up a good fight. However, by the third round the size difference was starting to pay off for Pinca. He used his strength to tie Saenchai up and win a close but controversial decision. A headbutt by Pinca on Saenchai went unpunished as well as Saenchai's streak of 20 or more straight wins against foreign fighters was snapped.

He rematched Singdam Kiatmoo9 on October 4, 2012, at Rajadamnern, and won by decision.

He beat Pakorn Sakyothin by decision at Super Showdown 4 in Glasgow, Scotland on November 10, 2012, and then took a points victory over Damian Alamos twelve days later at Best of Siam 2 in Paris, France. Saenchai then defeated Liam Harrison for the third time at Muay Thai Warriors in Macau on December 9, 2012, taking a clear-cut unanimous decision.

He outpointed the bowl cut Diesellek Aoodonmuang at Yokkao Extreme 2013 on January 26, 2013, in Milan, Italy.

On March 9, 2013, Saenchai outpointed Houcine Bennoui at Siam Warriors in Cork, Ireland.

He lost to 17-year-old phenom Yodwicha Por Boonsit on points at Lumpinee on May 10, 2013. The pair were set to rematch on June 7, 2013, but a lingering neck injury forced Saenchai out of the bout.

He debuted under Oriental kickboxing rules at Hoost Cup: Kings in Nagoya, Japan on June 16, 2013, and beat Yosuke Mizuochi by unanimous decision in a three-round fight.

He beat Rafi Bohic by unanimous decision at Muay Thai Warriors: Dabble in Chiang Mai on June 28, 2013, in Chiang Mai, Thailand.

Saenchai ran through a field of overmatched farangs to win the Toyota Vigo Marathon Tournament on July 24, 2013, in Phitsanulok.

Saenchai beat Kongsak Sitboonmee by decision in a rematch at Rajadamnern on August 8, 2013.

It was reported that he would fight Mickaël Piscitello at the WBC World Muay Thai Millennium Championship in Saint-Pierre, Réunion on September 7, 2013. However, he denied ever being on the card.

He fought Andrei Kulebin at Combat Renaissance in China on September 17, 2013.

He beat Singdam Kiatmuu9 by decision at Yokkao 5 in Pattaya, Thailand on November 15, 2013.

He lost an extension round decision to Kong Hong Xing at the K-1 World MAX 2013 World Championship Tournament Quarter Finals - Part 1 in Foshan, China on December 28, 2013.

=== 2014 ===
He lost to Petchboonchu FA Group on points at the last ever show held at the old Lumpinee Stadium on February 7, 2014.

Saenchai defeated Victor Nagbe by decision in a -65 kg match at Yokkao 7 in Pattaya, Thailand on February 19, 2014.

He was scheduled for a March 8, 2014, meeting with Irishman Stephen Hodgers at Origins IV at Welterweight (-64.00 kg/141 lb) in Perth, Western Australia. Saenchai was unable to compete, however, as he did not meet certain criteria demanded by the Western Australia Combat Sports Commission and was replaced by Komkit Chanawong.

Saenchai beat Nong-O on points in a three-rounder at the grand opening of the new Lumpinee Stadium on February 28, 2014.

Saenchai defeated Shota Sato via unanimous decision at Hoost Cup: Legend in Nagoya, Japan on March 23, 2014.

He beat Kamen Picken via UD at Combat Banchamek in Surin, Thailand on April 14, 2014.

He defeated Bertrand Lambert via decision at Muay Thai in Macau on June 6, 2014.

He will rematch Yetkin Özkul in a fight for the WMC World Lightweight (-61.2 kg/135 lb) Championship at Monte Carlo Fighting Masters 2014 in Monte Carlo, Monaco on June 14, 2014.

On September 24, 2014, Saenchai P.K. Saenchai Muaythaigym made his debut on the Thai Fight stage, defeating the strong Scotsman Craig Dickson (Sumalee) under Kard Chuek rules (with rope bindings taking the place of gloves).

=== 2017 ===
Saenchai defeated Shan Cangelosi of Italy by decision in the main event at THAI FIGHT Turin on May 27, 2017, in Turin, Italy. Saenchai took a unanimous decision against Spanish Jonathan Fabian at Yokkao 26 on September 11, 2017, in Hong Kong. Saenchai defeated Juan Salmeron by decision on September 30, 2017, at Thai Fight Barcelona.

Saenchai fought and defeated American Arthur Sorsor by decision at KHMER - THAI FIGHT on November 25, 2017, in Phnom Penh, Cambodia.

=== 2018 ===
Saenchai went the entirety of 2018 undefeated in Muay Thai competition. He spent the whole year fighting in the THAI FIGHT circuit, going a perfect 9–0.

On January 27, 2018, he defeated Henrique Muller of Brazil by KO in the 3rd round at THAI FIGHT Bangkok 2017 to win the 2017 THAI FIGHT 67 kg King's Cup title, his second THAI FIGHT championship.

Saenchai then stopped Iran's Ramin Moazzami by 1st-round KO on March 24, 2018, at THAI FIGHT Mueang Khon 2018.

On April 21, 2018, he defeated Italy's Luca Roma THAI FIGHT Italy 2018 by unanimous decision.

On May 12, 2018, he defeated another Italian, Andrea Serra, by unanimous decision at THAI FIGHT Samui 2018.

On July 7, 2018, Saenchai defeated Amir Naseri of Iran at THAI FIGHT Hat Yai 2018.

On August 25, 2018, he defeated Russia's Nikita Surovezhkin by unanimous decision at THAI FIGHT Rayong 2018.

On October 27, 2018, Saenchai took a unanimous decision victory over Isaac Santos of Brazil at THAI FIGHT Chiang Rai 2018.

On November 24, 2018, he defeated Sif El Islam Djebaili by 1st-round KO at THAI FIGHT Saraburi 2018.

To close out the year, Saenchai faced Jamal Madani for the 2018 THAI FIGHT 67 kg title at THAI FIGHT Nakhon Ratchasima 2018 on December 22, 2018. After three rounds, Saenchai was awarded the unanimous decision victory and was crowned the 2018 THAI FIGHT 67 kg King's Cup Champion, claiming his third consecutive promotional title.

=== 2019 ===
Saenchai began the year fighting at Yokkao 36 in Italy on January 26, 2019, where he defeated Cristian Faustino by unanimous decision.

He returned to the THAI FIGHT stage in time for the first event of the year, where he faced Firdavs Boynazarov at THAI FIGHT Phuket 2019. Saenchai went on to defeat Boynazarov by unanimous decision.

On March 8, 2019, Saenchai headed out for the UAE to compete at Fight Night Dubai to battle Valerii Abramenko of Ukraine, whom he defeated by unanimous decision.

Saenchai returned to THAI FIGHT once again on March 30, 2019. At THAI FIGHT Mueang Khon 2019, he knocked out Javad Bigdeli of Iran in the 2nd round after a series of knees to the body.

On June 29, 2019, he defeated Argentina's Cristian Pastore by unanimous decision at THAI FIGHT Betong 2019.

On August 24, 2019, Saenchai defeated Cem Deniz of Australia by unanimous decision at THAI FIGHT Kham Chanod 2019 in Udon Thani.

In September, 2019, Saenchai went on a Muay Thai seminar tour in the US with Spencer Brown, Yodchai and Kru Jack. They visited 20 gyms in 20 different cities over a 3-week period.

On October 26, 2019, Saenchai delivered a 1st-round knockout victory over Batjargal Sundui of Mongolia at THAI FIGHT Bangsaen 2019.

Saenchai was entered into the 2019 THAI FIGHT 70 kg King's Cup Tournament prior to THAI FIGHT Mae Sot 2019. On November 23, 2019, Saenchai defeated Alejandro Amicucci of Argentina via 1st-round KO in the THAI FIGHT 70 kg King's Cup Tournament Semi Finals at THAI FIGHT Mae Sot 2019, advancing to the Tournament Final.

On December 21, 2019, he would face Tophik Abdullaev of Georgia in THAI FIGHT 70 kg King's Cup Tournament Final at the THAI FIGHT finale of 2019: THAI FIGHT: Thai Fest in Patong. The fight would see a quick finish as Saenchai landed a knee in the clinch during the 1st round, claiming the KO victory. As a result, he would be crowned the 2019 THAI FIGHT 70 kg King's Cup Tournament Champion, his second title with THAI FIGHT.

=== 2020 ===
At YOKKAO 45 & 46, Saenchai fought Shan Cangelosi for the YOKKAO Diamond Welterweight title. He won the fight by a unanimous decision.

After an eight-month break, as no events were held during the COVID-19 pandemic, Saenchai returned at the Thai Fight: New Normal event against Rodrigo Freitas. He won the fight by decision. At Thai Fight Begins, he fought Esmail Ganji in the event headliner, winning the fight by decision.

Saenchai fought twice in November 2020. At Thai Fight Korat 2020, he fought Danilo Reis, and won by decision. Three weeks later, he scored a second-round knockout of Gabriel dos Santos.

=== 2021 ===
Saenchai's first fight of 2021 came on April 3, at Thai Fight Nan, against Seth Grande. Saenchai won a dominant unanimous decision.

Seanchai faced Omar Elouers at THAI FIGHT Khao Aor on December 19, 2021. He won the fight by a first-round knockout.

=== 2022 ===
On August 2, 2022, it was announced that Saenchai had signed a multi-fight contract with Bare Knuckle Fighting Championship and is expected to debut in his native Thailand in late 2022. However, in October 2022 it was announced that Saenchai would face fellow Muay Thai legend Buakaw Banchamek in a bare-knuckle muay thai bout in a BKFC event in March 2023.

=== 2023 ===
In mid-February 2023, it was announced that due to legal implications regarding the use of the name muay thai in marketing material, the bout was indefinitely postponed and effectively canceled. In June 2023, BKFC Asia CEO Nick Chapman announced that the fight with Saenchai was on again, this time promoted as a Special Rules Bare Knuckle Thai Fight and taking place at BKFC Asia 5 on November 5, 2023.

== Titles and accomplishments ==
=== Muay Thai ===
- Lumpinee Stadium
  - 1998 Lumpinee Stadium Super Flyweight (115 lbs) Champion
  - 1999 2x Lumpinee Stadium Bantamweight (118 lbs) Champion
  - 2005 Lumpinee Stadium Super Featherweight (130 lbs) Champion
    - One successful title defense
  - 2006 Lumpinee Stadium Super Featherweight (130 lbs) Champion
  - 2010 Lumpinee Stadium Lightweight (135 lbs) Champion
    - One successful title defense
- Muay Thai Association of America (MTAA)
  - 2010 MTAA World Lightweight (135 lbs) Champion
- Toyota Marathon
  - 2010 Toyota Marathon Tournament Champion
  - 2013 Toyota Marathon Tournament Champion
  - 2014 Toyota Marathon Tournament Runner-up
- World Muaythai Council (WMC)
  - 2010 WMC World Lightweight (135 lbs) Champion
    - One successful title defense
- WBC Muay Thai
  - 2011 WBC Diamond World Champion
- World Professional Muaythai Federation (WPMF)
  - 2012 WPMF World Welterweight (147 lbs) Champion
- Muay Thai Warriors
  - 2012 Muay Thai Warriors Welterweight (147 lbs) Campion
- THAI FIGHT
  - 2016 THAI FIGHT Kard Chuek 70 kg King's Cup Champion
  - 2017 THAI FIGHT 67 kg King's Cup Champion
  - 2018 THAI FIGHT 67 kg King's Cup Champion
  - 2019 THAI FIGHT 70 kg King's Cup Champion
  - 2022 THAI FIGHT 70 kg King's Cup Champion
  - 2024 THAI FIGHT 70 kg King's Cup Champion
- Phoenix Fighting Championship
  - 2017 Phoenix Fighting Championship 63.5 kg Champion
- YOKKAO
  - 2020 YOKKAO Diamond Welterweight (147 lbs) Champion

=== Boxing ===
- Pan Asian Boxing Association (PABA)
  - 2003 PABA Featherweight interim champion (Defense: 1)

=== Accomplishments ===
- Sports Writers Association of Thailand
  - 1999 Sports Writers Association of Thailand Fighter of the Year
  - 2008 Sports Writers Association of Thailand Fighter of the Year
- Sports Authority of Thailand
  - 2008 Sports Authority of Thailand Fighter of the Year
- Rajadamnern Stadium
  - 2026 Rajadamnern Stadium Hall of Fame
- THAI FIGHT
  - Most championships in Thai Fight (6)
  - Most wins in Thai Fight

== Muay Thai record ==
Muay Thai record
330 Wins, 49 Losses, 6 Draws
Date	Result	Opponent	Event	Location	Method	Round	Time
2026-10-18	Win	(Morocco) Ayoub Nouri	THAI FIGHT Satriwitthaya 2	Bangkok, Thailand	Decision (Unanimous)	3	3:00
2026-07-12	Win	(Iran) Payam Sepehri	THAI FIGHT Songkhla	Songkhla, Thailand	TKO (Referee stoppage)	3	
2026-05-11	Win	(Brazil) Bruno Merces	THAI FIGHT We Love Pathum	Prachathipat, Thailand	Decision (Unanimous)	3	3:00
2026-04-19	Win	(China) Wu Guanhao	THAI FIGHT Wat Pa Wang Nam Yen	Maha Sarakham, Thailand	KO (High kick)	1	
2026-03-01	Win	(South Korea) Lee Younghyun	THAI FIGHT Thung Samrit	Nakhon Ratchasima, Thailand	Decision (Unanimous)	3	3:00
2026-02-01	Win	(Iran) Navid Alizadeh	THAI FIGHT Phatthalung	Phatthalung, Thailand	KO (Knee to the body)	2	
2025-12-21	Win	(Iran) Hamid Bahrehmandfar	THAI FIGHT Phayao	Phayao, Thailand	Decision (Unanimous)	3	3:00
2025-07-06	Win	(Myanmar) Hla Win	THAI FIGHT Pluak Daeng	Pluak Daeng, Thailand	KO (Knee to the body)	2	
2025-06-08	Win	(Brazil) Kaique Goncalves	THAI FIGHT Petchaburi	Phetchaburi, Thailand	Decision (Unanimous)	3	3:00
2025-04-06	Win	(Germany) Jesse-Bjorn Buckler	THAI FIGHT Rome III	Rome, Italy	KO (Knee to the body)	1	
2025-03-16	Win	(Iran) Mehrdad Amini	THAI FIGHT Nai Khanom Tom	Phra Nakhon Si Ayutthaya, Thailand	Decision (Unanimous)	3	3:00
2025-02-16	Win	(Morocco) Hicham Boulahri	THAI FIGHT Ubon Ratchathani	Ubon Ratchathani, Thailand	Decision (Unanimous)	3	3:00
2024-12-22	Win	(Iran) Abbas Takaloo	THAI FIGHT Phayao	Phayao, Thailand	Decision (Unanimous)	3	3:00
Wins the 2024 THAI FIGHT 154 lbs (70kg) King's Cup title.
2024-11-24	Win	(Brazil) Heyder Alcantara	THAI FIGHT Ajarn Tom	Roi Et, Thailand	KO (Knee to the body)	2	
2024-07-07	Win	(Brazil) Victor Hugo Nunes	THAI FIGHT Phraya Phicai Dap Hek	Uttaradit, Thailand	Decision (Unanimous)	3	3:00
2024-03-24	Win	(Myanmar) Man Ye Kyaw Sar	THAI FIGHT Pluak Daeng	Pluak Daeng, Thailand	KO (High kick)	1	
2024-02-25	Win	(Iran) Mohammad Barghi	THAI FIGHT Phimai	Phimai, Thailand	Decision (Unanimous)	3	3:00
2024-02-04	Win	(Turkey) Adem Kabak	THAI FIGHT Rajabhakti Park	Hua Hin, Thailand	Decision (Unanimous)	3	3:00
2023-06-18	Win	(Georgia (country)) Tophik Abdullaev	THAI FIGHT Luk Luang Phor Sothorn	Chachoengsao, Thailand	TKO (3 knockdowns)	2	
2023-05-21	Win	(Brazil) Danilo Reis	THAI FIGHT 100 Years Rajabhat Korat	Nakhon Ratchasima, Thailand	KO (Straight to the body)	1	
2023-04-22	Draw	(Italy) Alessio Malatesta	THAI FIGHT Rome	Rome, Italy	Decision (Unanimous)	3	3:00
2022-12-24	Win	(Cambodia) Elit Honkorng	Thai Fight: Metropolitan Police Bureau 100th Anniversary	Bangkok, Thailand	KO (High kick)	2	
2022-11-20	Win	(Norway) Mohammad Khalil	THAI FIGHT Vana Nava Hua Hin	Hua Hin, Thailand	Decision (Unanimous)	3	3:00
2022-10-16	Win	(Vietnam) Nguyen Doan Long	THAI FIGHT Vajiravudh	Bangkok, Thailand	Decision (Unanimous)	3	3:00
2022-06-26	Win	(Argentina) Alan Yauny	THAI FIGHT Sisaket	Uthumphon Phisai, Thailand	Decision (Unanimous)	3	3:00
2022-05-29	Win	(Iran) Ali Ghodratisaraskan	THAI FIGHT Nakhon Sawan	Nakhon Sawan, Thailand	KO (Knee to the body)	2	
2022-05-08	Win	(United States) Timothy Kamal	THAI FIGHT Sung Noen	Sung Noen, Thailand	KO (Left straight and knee to the head)	1	
2022-04-17	Win	(United States) Seth Grande	THAI FIGHT We Love Pathum	Pathum Thani, Thailand	Decision (Unanimous)	3	3:00
2022-03-20	Win	(Israel) Maxim Branis	THAI FIGHT Lampang	Lampang, Thailand	Decision	3	3:00
2021-12-19	Win	(Morocco) Omar Elouers	THAI FIGHT Khao Aor	Phatthalung, Thailand	KO (Knee to the body)	1	
2021-04-03	Win	(United States) Seth Grande	THAI FIGHT Nan	Nan, Thailand	Decision	3	3:00
2020-11-28	Win	(Brazil) Gabriel dos Santos	THAI FIGHT Pluak Daeng	Rayong, Thailand	KO (Knee to the body)	2	
2020-11-07	Win	(Brazil) Danilo Reis	THAI FIGHT Korat 2020	Nakhon Ratchasima, Thailand	Decision	3	3:00
2020-10-17	Win	(Iran) Esmail Ganji	THAI FIGHT Begins	Nonthaburi, Thailand	Decision	3	3:00
2020-09-19	Win	(Brazil) Rodrigo Freitas	THAI FIGHT: New Normal	Bangkok, Thailand	Decision	3	3:00
2020-01-25	Win	(Italy) Shan Cangelosi	YOKKAO 45 & 46	Turin, Italy	Decision	3	3:00
Wins the 147 lbs YOKKAO Diamond title.
2019-12-21	Win	(Georgia (country)) Tophik Abdullaev	THAI FIGHT: Thai Fest in Patong	Phuket, Thailand	KO (knee)	1	
For the 2019 THAI FIGHT 154 lbs (70kg) King's Cup title
2019-11-23	Win	(Argentina) Alejandro Amicucci	THAI FIGHT Mae Sot	Mae Sot, Thailand	KO (knees)	1	
2019-10-26	Win	(Mongolia) Batjargal Sundui	THAI FIGHT Bangsaen	Chonburi, Thailand	KO (left cross)	1	
2019-08-24	Win	(Australia) Cem Deniz	THAI FIGHT Kham Chanod	Udon Thani, Thailand	Decision	3	3:00
2019-06-29	Win	(Argentina) Cristian Pastore	THAI FIGHT Betong	Betong, Thailand	Decision	3	3:00
2019-04-27	Win	(Russia) Maksim Manafov	THAI FIGHT Samui 2019	Ko Samui, Thailand	Decision	3	3:00
2019-03-30	Win	(Iran) Javad Bidgeli	THAI FIGHT Mueang Khon	Nakhon Si Thammarat, Thailand	KO (knees)	2	
2019-03-08	Win	(Ukraine) Valerii Abramenko	Fight Night Dubai	United Arab Emirates	Decision (Unanimous)	3	3:00
2019-02-23	Win	(Uzbekistan) Firdavs Boynazarov	THAI FIGHT Phuket	Phuket, Thailand	Decision (Unanimous)	3	3:00
2019-01-26	Win	(Italy) Cristian Faustino	YOKKAO 36	Turin, Italy	Decision (Unanimous)	3	3:00
2018-12-22	Win	(Iran) Jamal Madani	THAI FIGHT Nakhon Ratchasima	Nakhon Ratchasima, Thailand	Decision (Unanimous)	3	3:00
For the 2018 THAI FIGHT 147 lbs title
2018-11-24	Win	(Algeria) Sif El Islam Djebaili	THAI FIGHT Saraburi	Saraburi, Thailand	KO (left overhand)	1	
2018-10-27	Win	(Brazil) Isaac Santos	THAI FIGHT Chiangrai 2018	Chiang Rai, Thailand	Decision (Unanimous)	3	3:00
2018-08-25	Win	(Russia) Nikita Surovezhkin	THAI FIGHT Rayong	Rayong, Thailand	Decision (Unanimous)	3	3:00
2018-07-07	Win	(Iran) Amir Naseri	THAI FIGHT Hat Yai	Hat Yai, Thailand	Decision (Unanimous)	3	3:00
2018-05-12	Win	(Italy) Andrea Serra	THAI FIGHT Samui 2018	Ko Samui, Thailand	Decision (Unanimous)	3	3:00
2018-04-21	Win	(Italy) Luca Roma	THAI FIGHT Rome	Rome, Italy	Decision (Unanimous)	3	3:00
2018-03-24	Win	(Iran) Ramin Moazzami	THAI FIGHT Mueang Khon 2018	Nakhon Si Thammarat, Thailand	KO (left elbow)	1	
2018-01-27	Win	(Brazil) Henrique Muller	THAI FIGHT Bangkok 2017	Bangkok, Thailand	KO (left high kick)	3	
2017-12-23	Win	(Canada) Abdou Haddad	THAI FIGHT Chiang Mai	Chiang Mai, Thailand	Decision (Unanimous)	3	3:00
2017-11-25	Win	(United States) Arthur Sorsor	KHMER - THAI FIGHT	Phnom Penh, Cambodia	Decision (Unanimous)	3	3:00
2017-09-30	Win	(Spain) Juan Salmeron	THAI FIGHT Barcelona	Barcelona, Spain	Decision (Unanimous)	3	3:00
2017-09-11	Win	(Spain) Jonathan Fabian	YOKKAO 26	Hong Kong	Decision	3	3:00
2017-07-15	Win	(Australia) Chadd Collins	THAI FIGHT: We Love Yala	Thailand	Decision	3	3:00
2017-05-27	Win	(Italy) Shan Cangelosi	THAI FIGHT Italy	Turin, Italy	Decision	3	3:00
2017-04-29	Win	(France) Azize Hlali	Phoenix Fighting Championship	Lebanon	Decision	3	3:00
2017-04-08	Win	(France) Abdelnour Ali-Kada	THAI FIGHT Paris	France	Decision	3	3:00
2016-12-24	Win	(Brazil) Julio Lobo	THAI FIGHT The Fighter King	Thailand	Decision	3	3:00
2016-11-19	Win	(South Africa) Ncedo Gomba	THAI FIGHT AIR RACE 1	Thailand	TKO (left cross)	2	
2016-10-28	Win	(Bosnia and Herzegovina) Ognjen Topic	YOKKAO 22	Hong Kong	Decision	3	3:00
2016-10-15	Win	(Papua New Guinea) Jonathan Tuhu	THAI FIGHT Chengdu	Chengdu, China	KO (punch)	2	
2016-09-11	Win	(England) Charlie Peters	THAI FIGHT London	London, England	Decision	3	3:00
2016-08-20	Win	(Uzbekistan) Anvar Boynazarov	THAI FIGHT KMITL	Thailand	Decision	3	3:00
2016-07-23	Win	(Russia) Iurii Bukhvalov	THAI FIGHT Proud to Be Thai	Thailand	KO (punch)	1	
2016-06-25	Win	(France) Eddy Nait Slimani	Glory 31: Amsterdam	Amsterdam, Netherlands	Decision (Unanimous)	3	3:00
2016-04-30	Win	(Republic of Ireland) Sean Clancy	THAI FIGHT Samui 2016	Ko Samui, Thailand	TKO	3	
2016-03-19	Win	(Russia) Sergei Soroloev	THAI FIGHT Korat	Thailand	Decision	3	3:00
2016-02-06	Win	(Spain) Victor Conesa	Enfusion	Thailand	Decision	3	3:00
2016-01-16	Win	(China) Meng Qinghao	Hero Legends	China	Decision	3	3:00
2015-12-31	Win	(Cambodia) Phal Sophorn	THAI FIGHT Count Down	Bangkok, Thailand	TKO (punch)	1	
2015-12-05	Win	(Iran) Vahid Shahbazi	Royal Cup Muay Thai	Kuala Lumpur, Malaysia	Decision	5	3:00
2015-10-24	Win	(Brazil) Victor Nunes	THAI FIGHT Vietnam	Ho Chi Minh City, Vietnam	Decision	5	3:00
2015-10-10	Win	(Netherlands) Massaro Glunder	Yokkao 15	England	Decision	5	3:00
2015-09-17	Win	(Russia) Takhmasib Kerimov	THAI FIGHT Russia	Moscow, Russia	Decision	3	3:00
2015-08-22	Win	(France) Charles Francois	THAI FIGHT Proud to Be Thai 2015: Narathiwat	Narathiwat, Thailand	KO (left cross)	2	
2015-08-08	Win	(Morocco) Hamza Essalih	Fight League	Morocco	Decision	5	3:00
2015-07-18	Win	(Italy) Alessio D´Angelo	THAI FIGHT Proud to Be Thai 2015: China	China	KO (left high kick)	1	0:30
2015-06-19	Win	(Turkey) Yetkin Ozkul	Best of Siam 6	Paris, France	TKO (broken nose)	5	
2015-05-10	Win	(Japan) Yasuyuki	Wanchai Super Fights	Japan	Decision	5	3:00
2015-05-02	Win	(Canada) Matt Embree	THAI FIGHT Proud to Be Thai: Samui	Ko Samui, Thailand	Decision	3	3:00
2015-04-04	Win	(Brazil) Jose Neto	THAI FIGHT CRMA	Nakhon Nayok, Thailand	Decision	3	3:00
2014-12-21	Win	(Algeria) Gjilas Barache	THAI FIGHT 2014	Thailand	KO (head kick)	1	
2014-11-22	Win	(France) Morgan Adrar	THAI FIGHT Khon Kaen	Khon Kaen, Thailand	Decision	3	3:00
2014-10-09	Loss	(Thailand) Phetmorakot Wor.Sangprapai	Rajadamnern Stadium	Thailand	Decision	5	
2014-09-20	Win	(Scotland) Craig Dickson	THAI FIGHT WORLD BATTLE 2014: Vietnam	Vietnam	KO (body punch)	2	
2014-08-16	Win	(Republic of Ireland) Stephen Meleady	Sandee & Siam Warriors Muay Thai Super Fights	Dublin, Ireland	TKO (cuts)	4	
2014-06-06	Win	(France) Bertrand Lambert	Muay Thai in Macau	Macau	Decision	5	3:00
2014-05-30	Loss	(Thailand) Singdam Kiatmuu9	Toyota Marathon Final	Surat Thani, Thailand	Decision	3	3:00
2014-05-30	Win	(Brazil) Jose Neto	Toyota Marathon Semi Final	Surat Thani, Thailand	Decision	3	3:00
2014-05-30	Win	(Spain) Victor Jimenez	Toyota Marathon Quarter Final	Surat Thani, Thailand	Decision	3	3:00
2014-04-14	Win	(England) Kamen Picken	Combat Banchamek	Surin, Thailand	Decision (unanimous)	3	3:00
2014-03-23	Win	(Japan) Shota Sato	Hoost Cup: Legend	Nagoya, Japan	Decision (unanimous)	3	3:00
2014-02-28	Win	(Thailand) Nong-O Gaiyanghadao	Grand Opening of New Lumpinee Stadium	Bangkok, Thailand	Decision	5	3:00
2014-02-19	Win	(Australia) Victor Nagbe	Yokkao 7	Pattaya, Thailand	Decision	3	3:00
2014-02-07	Loss	(Thailand) Petchboonchu F.A.Group	Lumpinee Stadium	Bangkok, Thailand	Decision	5	3:00
2014-01-17	Win	(Brazil) Adayton Freitas	Muay Thai Warriors	Phuket, Thailand	TKO (punches)	3	
2013-12-28	Loss	(China) Kong Hongxing	K-1 World MAX World Championship Tournament Quarter-final in Foshan	Foshan, China	Ext. R Decision (split)	4	
2013-12-03	Loss	(Thailand) Petchboonchu F.A.Group	Lumpinee Stadium	Bangkok, Thailand	Decision	5	3:00
2013-11-15	Win	(Thailand) Singdam Kiatmuu9	Yokkao 5	Pattaya, Thailand	Decision	5	3:00
2013-10-31	Win	(Australia) Victor Nagbe	Toyota Muay Thai Marathon	Hat Yai, Thailand	Decision	3	3:00
2013-10-11	Win	(Thailand) Kongsak Sitboonmee	Lumpinee Stadium	Bangkok, Thailand	Decision	5	3:00
2013-09-17	Win	(Belarus) Andrei Kulebin	Combat Renaissance	China	Decision	3	3:00
2013-09-04	Win	(Thailand) Kongsak Sitboonmee	Rajadamnern Stadium	Bangkok, Thailand	Decision	5	3:00
2013-08-08	Win	(Thailand) Kongsak Sitboonmee	Rajadamnern Stadium	Bangkok, Thailand	Decision	5	3:00
2013-07-24	Win	(Uzbekistan) Naimjon Tuhtaboyev	Toyota Vigo Marathon Tournament, Final	Phitsanulok, Thailand	Decision (unanimous)	3	3:00
Wins the 2013 Toyota Vigo Marathon Tournament (140 lbs)
2013-07-24	Win	(Iran) Vahid Shahbazi	Toyota Vigo Marathon Tournament, Semi Finals	Phitsanulok, Thailand	Decision (unanimous)	3	3:00
2013-07-24	Win	(Russia) Stanislav Patrakov	Toyota Vigo Marathon Tournament, Quarter Finals	Phitsanulok, Thailand	KO (elbow)	1	1:48
2013-06-28	Win	(France) Rafi Singpatong	Muay Thai Warriors: Dabble in Chiang Mai	Chiang Mai, Thailand	Decision (unanimous)	5	3:00
2013-06-16	Win	(Japan) Yosuke Mizuochi	Hoost Cup Kings	Nagoya, Aichi, Japan	Decision (unanimous)	3	3:00
2013-05-10	Loss	(Thailand) Yodwicha Por.Boonsit	Lumpinee Stadium	Bangkok, Thailand	Decision (split)	5	3:00
2013-03-09	Win	(France) Houcine Bennoui	Siam Warriors	Cork, Ireland	Decision	5	3:00
2013-01-26	Win	(Thailand) Diesellek Aoodonmuang	Yokkao Extreme 2013	Milan, Italy	Decision (unanimous)	5	3:00
2013-01-04	Loss	(Thailand) Singdam Kiatmuu9	Petchyindee, Lumpinee Stadium	Bangkok, Thailand	Decision	5	3:00
2012-12-09	Win	(England) Liam Harrison	Muay Thai Warriors	Macau, China	Decision (unanimous)	5	3:00
Defends the Muay Thai Warriors Welterweight (147 lbs) title.
2012-11-22	Win	(France) Damien Alamos	Best of Siam 2	Paris, France	Decision	5	3:00
2012-11-10	Win	(Thailand) Pakorn Sakyothin	Super Showdown 4	Glasgow, Scotland	Decision	5	3:00
2012-10-04	Win	(Thailand) Singdam Kiatmuu9	Wanmitchai, Rajadamnern Stadium	Bangkok, Thailand	Decision	5	3:00
2012-09-07	Loss	(Thailand) Singdam Kiatmuu9	Lumpinee Stadium	Bangkok, Thailand	Decision	5	3:00
For the Lumpinee Stadium Lightweight (135 lbs) title.
2012-08-19	Win	(China) JChao Li Dao	Muay Thai Warriors	China	KO (elbow)	1	
Wins the Muay Thai Warriors Welterweight (147 lbs) title.
2012-07-20	Win	(Uganda) Umar Semata	Muaythai Gala – TV 11	Ratchaburi, Thailand	Decision	5	3:00
Wins the WPMF Interim World Welterweight (147 lbs) title.
2012-06-14	Win	(France) Mehdi Zatout	Best of Siam	Paris, France	Decision	5	3:00
2012-06-08	Win	(Thailand) PenEk Sitnumnoi	Lumpinee Champion Krikkrai Fight	Bangkok, Thailand	Decision	5	3:00
2012-03-09	Win	(Thailand) Sagetdao Petpayathai	Lumpinee Stadium	Bangkok, Thailand	Decision	5	3:00
2012-01-21	Loss	(France) Fabio Pinca	Yokkao Extreme	Milan, Italy	Decision	3	3:00
2011-12-09	Loss	(Thailand) Sagetdao Petpayathai	Kriekkrai, Lumpinee Stadium	Bangkok, Thailand	Decision	5	3:00
2011-11-13	Win	(Japan) Shunsuke Ōishi	M-1 Fairtex Muay Thai Challenge Raorak Muay Final	Tokyo, Japan	KO (Left knee to the body)	4	1:35
2011-09-13	Win	(Thailand) Petchboonchu F.A.Group	Petchpiya, Lumpinee Stadium	Bangkok, Thailand	Decision	5	3:00
2011-08-14	Win	(United States) Kevin Ross	World Class Fights, Commerce Casino	Los Angeles, United States	Decision	5	3:00
For the WBC Muay Thai Diamond title and retains the 140 lbs MTAA World title
2011-07-07	Win	(Thailand) Kongsak Sitboonmee	Wanmitchai, Rajadamnern Stadium	Thailand	Decision	5	3:00
2011-06-25	Win	(Australia) Kurt Finlayson	Detonation 9	Caloundra, Australia	Decision (Unanimous)	5	3:00
Defends the WMC World Lightweight (135 lbs) title.
2011-06-10	Loss	(Thailand) Sagetdao Petpayathai	Kriekkrai, Lumpinee Stadium	Bangkok, Thailand	Decision	5	3:00
2011-04-09	Win	(England) Liam Harrison	Fight Sport Industries	Doncaster, England, UK	Decision	5	3:00
2010-12-29	Win	(Thailand) Nong-O SitOr	Wanmitrchai, Rajadamnern Stadium	Bangkok, Thailand	Decision	5	3:00
Defends the Lumpinee Stadium and WMC World Lightweight (135 lbs) titles.
2010-10-05	Win	(Thailand) Petchboonchu F.A.Group	Petchyindee, Lumpinee Stadium	Bangkok, Thailand	Decision	5	3:00
Wins the Lumpinee Stadium and WMC World Lightweight (135 lbs) titles.
2010-08-13	Win	(Thailand) Superbon Banchamek	Hatyai Stadium	Hatyai, South Thailand	Decision	5	3:00
2010-07-13	Win	(Thailand) Sagetdao Petpayathai	Ruamnamjai Wongkarnmuay, Lumpinee Stadium	Bangkok, Thailand	Decision	5	3:00
2010-07-02	Win	(Iran) Masoud Izadi	Toyota Cup 2010 Tournament, final	Nakhon Pathom, Thailand	KO (left cross)	1	1:56
Wins the 2010 Toyota Cup Tournament
2010-07-02	Win	(Japan) Issei Ingram Gym	Toyota Cup 2010 Tournament, semi final	Nakhon Pathom, Thailand	TKO (referee stoppage)	1	2:25
2010-07-02	Win	(England) Imran Khan	Toyota Cup 2010 Tournament, quarter final	Nakhon Pathom, Thailand	TKO (referee stoppage)	2	1:46
2010-06-19	Loss	(China) Wang Weihao	Wu Lin Feng	Henan, China	Decision	3	3:00
2010-06-04	Loss	(Thailand) Phetmankong Petchfergus	TV3 Omnoi Siamboxing Stadium	Bangkok, Thailand	Decision	5	3:00
2010-05-05	Win	(Thailand) Nong-O SitOr	Wanmitchai Grand Opening, Rajadamnern Stadium	Bangkok, Thailand	KO (left cross)	3	1:27
2010-04-03	Win	(Turkey) Yetkin Ozkul	S-8 Thaiboxing	Wuppertal, Germany	KO (left cross)	2	1:48
2010-03-14	Win	(Japan) Tetsuya Yamato	World Champion Muay Thai Extravaganza	El Monte, California, United States	KO (left high kick)	1	2:23
Wins the vacant MTAA World Lightweight (135 lbs) title.
2009-12-08	Loss	(Thailand) Sagetdao Petpayathai	Kriekkrai, Lumpinee Stadium	Bangkok, Thailand	Decision	5	3:00
For the vacant Lumpinee Stadium Lightweight (135 lbs) title.
2009-11-07	Win	(England) Rob Storey	MSA Muaythai Premier League	London, England	TKO (leg kicks)	4	0:13
2009-09-29	Win	(Thailand) Nong-O SitOr	Wanwerapon+JorPorRor7 Fight, Lumpinee Stadium	Bangkok, Thailand	Decision	5	3:00
2009-08-07	Loss	(Thailand) Petchboonchu F.A.Group	Petchpiya, Lumpinee Stadium	Bangkok, Thailand	Decision (Split)	5	3:00
Loses the Lumpinee Stadium Super Featherweight (130 lbs) title.
2009-07-03	Win	(Thailand) Petchboonchu F.A.Group (Thailand) Sagetdao Petpayathai	Lumpinee vs Rajadamnern, Lumpinee Stadium	Bangkok, Thailand	Decision	5	3:00
Petchboonchu fought the first three rounds and Sagetdao the last two.
2009-04-03	Win	(Thailand) Petchboonchu F.A.Group	Lumpinee Stadium	Bangkok, Thailand	Decision	5	3:00
2009-02-07	Win	(England) Liam Harrison	Muay Thai Legends	Croydon, England	Decision (Unanimous)	5	3:00
2009-01-06	Win	(Thailand) Nong-O SitOr	Lumpinee Stadium	Bangkok, Thailand	KO (Left cross)	3	
2008-12-23	Win	(South Korea) Ho Sae-eun	KING OF KINGS TOUITSU in KOBE	Kobe, Japan	KO (Left knee to the body)	3	2:56
2008-11-30	Win	(Belgium) Nico Veressen	SLAMM "Nederland vs Thailand V"	Almere, Netherlands	Decision (Unanimous)	5	3:00
2008-10-31	Win	(Thailand) Saenchainoi Toyotarayong	Lumpinee Champion Kriekkrai, Lumpinee Stadium	Bangkok, Thailand	Decision	5	3:00
2008-10-05	Win	(Japan) Yukihiro Komiya	Muay Thai Open 5	Tokyo, Japan	Decision (Unanimous)	5	3:00
2008-09-04	Win	(Thailand) Saenchainoi Toyotarayong	Daorungprabat, Rajadamnern Stadium	Bangkok, Thailand	Decision	5	3:00
2008-08-08	Win	(Thailand) Wuttidet Lukprabat	Lumpinee Kriekrai, Lumpinee Stadium	Bangkok, Thailand	Decision	5	3:00
2008-07-04	Loss	(Thailand) Wuttidet Lukprabat	Lumpinee Kriekrai, Lumpinee Stadium	Bangkok, Thailand	Decision	5	3:00
2008-05-02	Win	(Thailand) Orono Wor.Petchpun	Lumpinee Kriekrai, Lumpinee Stadium	Bangkok, Thailand	Decision	5	3:00
Wins the Lumpinee Stadium Super Featherweight (130 lbs) title.
2008-03-02	Win	(Morocco) Rachid Belani	SLAMM "Nederland vs Thailand IV"	Almere, Netherlands	Decision (Unanimous)	5	3:00
2008-02-05	Loss	(Thailand) Petchmankong Petchfergus	Lumpinee Stadium	Bangkok, Thailand	Decision	5	3:00
2007-12-07	Loss	(Thailand) Orono Wor.Petchpun	Lumpinee Stadium	Bangkok, Thailand	Decision (Unanimous)	5	3:00
Loses the Lumpinee Stadium Super Featherweight (130 lbs) title.
2007-10-11	Win	(Thailand) Jomthong Chuwattana	Por.Pramuk, Lumpinee Stadium	Bangkok, Thailand	Decision	5	3:00
2007-07-01	Win	(Japan) Shinya Ishige	NJKF "Fighting Evolution VIII -Counter The Asian Attack!!-"	Bunkyo, Tokyo, Japan	Decision (unanimous)	5	3:00
2007-04-21	Win	(France) Fabio Pinca	Gala de Levallois-Perret	Levallois, France	Decision (Unanimous)	5	3:00
2007-03-15	Win	(Thailand) Jaroenchai Kesagym	Rajadamnern Stadium	Bangkok, Thailand	KO (body kick)	3	
2007-01-28	Win	(Japan) Kenji Takemura	NJKF "Fighting Evolution II – Muay Thai Open-"	Kōtō, Tokyo, Japan	KO (left elbow)	4	1:52
2006-11-17	Loss	(Thailand) Nopparat Keatkhamtorn	Kaiyanghadao tournament, quarter final	Nakhon Ratchasima, Thailand	Decision	3	3:00
2006-09-22	Win	(Thailand) Duangsompong Kor.Sapaotong	Lumpinee Stadium	Bangkok, Thailand	Decision	5	3:00
Wins the vacant Lumpinee Stadium Super Featherweight (130 lbs) title.
2006-08-18	Win	(Thailand) Nong-O SitOr	Petchyindee, Lumpinee Stadium	Bangkok, Thailand	Decision	5	3:00
2006-07-21	Draw	(Thailand) Duangsompong Kor.Sapaotong	Wanboonya, Lumpinee Stadium	Bangkok, Thailand	Decision	5	3:00
2006-07-02	Win	(South Korea) Sang-Soo Lim	NJKF "Advance VI"	Kōtō, Tokyo, Japan	KO (Right hook)	2	1:42
2006-06-02	Loss	(Thailand) Nopparat Keatkhamtorn	Lumpinee Champion Krirkkrai, Lumpinee Stadium	Bangkok, Thailand	Decision	5	3:00
Loses the Lumpinee Stadium Super Featherweight (130 lbs) title.
2006-04-25	Draw	(Thailand) Nopparat Keatkhamtorn	Petchpiya, Lumpinee Stadium	Bangkok, Thailand	Decision	5	3:00
2006-03-24	Win	(Thailand) Singdam Kiatmuu9	Wanboonya, Lumpinee Stadium	Bangkok, Thailand	Decision	5	3:00
2006-03-19	Win	(Netherlands) Joad Erraji	SLAMM "Nederland vs Thailand"	Almere, Netherlands	KO	1	
2006-02-22	Win	(Thailand) Nopparat Keatkhamtorn	Meenayothin, Rajadamnern Stadium	Bangkok, Thailand	Decision	5	3:00
2006-01-17	Draw	(Thailand) Nopparat Keatkhamtorn	Petchyindee, Lumpinee Stadium	Bangkok, Thailand	Decision	5	3:00
Retains the Lumpinee Stadium Super Featherweight (130 lbs) title.
2005-12-09	Win	(Thailand) Singdam Kiatmuu9	Petchyindee, Lumpinee Stadium	Bangkok, Thailand	Decision	5	3:00
Wins the Lumpinee Stadium Super Featherweight (130 lbs) title.
2005-11-04	Win	(Thailand) Orono Wor.Petchpun	Fairtex, Lumpinee Stadium	Bangkok, Thailand	Decision (Unanimous)	5	3:00
2005-09-27	Loss	(Thailand) Nopparat Keatkhamtorn	Wanboonya, Lumpinee Stadium	Bangkok, Thailand	Decision	5	3:00
2005-09-06	Win	(Thailand) Kongpipop Petchyindee	Petchyindee, Lumpinee Stadium	Bangkok, Thailand	Decision	5	3:00
2005-07-19	Win	(Thailand) Singdam Kiatmuu9	Lumpinee Stadium	Bangkok, Thailand	Decision	5	3:00
2005-06-10	Loss	(Thailand) Singdam Kiatmuu9	Phetpiya + Jor.Por.Ror.7, Lumpinee Stadium	Bangkok, Thailand	Decision	5	3:00
2005-02-12	Win	(Thailand) Khem Sor.Ploenchit	Onesongchai, Huamark Stadium	Bangkok, Thailand	KO (Sweep)	4	0:34
2004-12-29	Win	(Thailand) Yodbuangam Lukbanyai	Onesongchai, Rajadamnern Stadium	Bangkok, Thailand	TKO (Leg injury)	3	
2004-10-25	Loss	(Thailand) Khem Sor.Ploenchit	Phalokmuaythai ITV, Omnoi Stadium	Bangkok, Thailand	Decision (Unanimous)	5	3:00
2004-09-27	Win	(Thailand) Bovy Sor.Udomson	Onesongchai, Rajadamnern Stadium	Bangkok, Thailand	TKO (Referee stoppage)	4	
2004-06-07	Win	(Thailand) Khem Sor.Ploenjit	Onesongchai, Rajadamnern Stadium	Bangkok, Thailand	Decision	5	3:00
2004-05-05	Win	(Thailand) Puja Sor.Suwanee	Phalangnum, Rajadamnern Stadium	Bangkok, Thailand	Decision	5	3:00
2003-08-28	Win	(Thailand) Ronnachai Naratreekul	Onesongchai, Lumpinee Stadium	Bangkok, Thailand	Decision	5	3:00
2003-06-23	Win	(Thailand) Sayannoi Kiatprapat	Onesongchai + Petchthongdam, Rajadamnern Stadium	Bangkok, Thailand	Decision	5	3:00
2003-04-26	Win	(Thailand) Phet-Ek Sitjaopho	Onesongchai, Wat Laem Tai	Chachoengsao, Thailand	Decision	5	3:00
2003-03-03	Win	(Thailand) Nongbee Kiatyongyut	Onesongchai, Rajadamnern Stadium	Bangkok, Thailand	Decision	5	3:00
2002-12-03	Win	(Thailand) Sanghiran Lukbanyai	Petchyindee, Lumpinee Stadium	Bangkok, Thailand	Decision	5	3:00
2002-11-04	Win	(Thailand) Klairung Sor.Sasipagym		Bangkok, Thailand	Decision	5	3:00
2002-10-09	Win	(Thailand) Khunpinit Kiattawan	Onesongchai, Rajadamnern Stadium	Bangkok, Thailand	Decision	5	3:00
2002-09-09	Loss	(Thailand) Klairung Sor.Sasipagym	Onesongchai, Rajadamnern Stadium	Bangkok, Thailand	Decision	5	3:00
2002-08-07	Win	(Thailand) Attachai Nor.Sripueng	Petchthongkham + Onesongchai, Rajadamnern Stadium	Bangkok, Thailand	Decision	5	3:00
2002-07-09	Win	(Thailand) Phet-Ek Sitjaopho	Petchsuphaphan + Petchburapha, Lumpinee Stadium	Bangkok, Thailand	Decision	5	3:00
2002-03-20	Win	(Thailand) Sakaothong Phetnongnut	Phetthongkham, Rajadamnern Stadium	Bangkok, Thailand	Decision	5	3:00
2001-12-19	Win	(Thailand) Nongbee Kiatyongyut	56th Anniversary, Rajadamnern Stadium	Bangkok, Thailand	Decision	5	3:00
2001-11-21	Loss	(Thailand) Nongbee Kiatyongyut	Onesongchai, Rajadamnern Stadium	Bangkok, Thailand	Decision	5	3:00
2001-05-31	Loss	(Thailand) Saengmorakot Sor.Ploenchit	Onesongchai, Rajadamnern Stadium	Bangkok, Thailand	Decision	5	3:00
2001-04-05	Win	(Thailand) Attachai Por.Samranchai	Onesongchai, Rajadamnern Stadium	Bangkok, Thailand	Decision	5	3:00
2001-02-14	Loss	(Thailand) Saengmorakot Sor.Ploenchit	Onesongchai, Rajadamnern Stadium	Bangkok, Thailand	Decision (Unanimous)	5	3:00
For the vacant WMC World Super Featherweight (130 lbs) title.
2000-12-02	Loss	(Thailand) Namsaknoi Yudthagarngamtorn	Lumpinee Stadium	Bangkok, Thailand	Decision	5	3:00
2000-10-31	Win	(Thailand) Thongthai Por.Burapha	Onesongchai, Lumpinee Stadium	Bangkok, Thailand	Decision	5	3:00
2000-10-06	Draw	(Thailand) Attachai Por.Samranchai	Onesongchai, Lumpinee Stadium	Bangkok, Thailand	Decision (Unanimous)	5	3:00
2000-09-08	Loss	(Thailand) Samkor Chor.Rathchatasupak	Onesongchai, Lumpinee Stadium	Bangkok, Thailand	Decision	5	3:00
2000-08-04	Win	(Thailand) Samkor Chor.Rathchatasupak	Onesongchai, Lumpinee Stadium	Bangkok, Thailand	Decision	5	3:00
2000-07-18	Win	(Thailand) Rambojiew Dongolfservice	Onesongchai, Lumpinee Stadium	Bangkok, Thailand	Decision	5	3:00
2000-06-02	Draw	(Thailand) Rambojiew Dongolfservice	Onesongchai, Lumpinee Stadium	Bangkok, Thailand	Decision	5	3:00
2000-04-04	Win	(Thailand) Attachai Por.Samranchai	Lumpinee Stadium	Bangkok, Thailand	Decision	5	3:00
2000-03-03	Win	(Thailand) Attachai Por.Samranchai	Onesongchai, Lumpinee Stadium	Bangkok, Thailand	Decision	5	3:00
2000-02-11	Win	(Thailand) Nongbee Kiatyongyut	Onesongchai, Lumpinee Stadium	Bangkok, Thailand	Decision	5	3:00
1999-12-24	Win	(Thailand) Pornpitak Phetudomchai	Onesongchai, Lumpinee Stadium	Bangkok, Thailand	Decision	5	3:00
1999-11-30	Win	(Thailand) Kochasarn Singklongsi	Onesongchai, Lumpinee Stadium	Bangkok, Thailand	Decision	5	3:00
1999-11-05	Win	(Thailand) Kochasarn Singklongsi	Lumpinee Stadium	Bangkok, Thailand	Decision	5	3:00
1999-09-21	Win	(Thailand) Khunpinit Kiattawan	Onesongchai, Lumpinee Stadium	Bangkok, Thailand	Decision	5	3:00
1999-08-17	Win	(Thailand) Chalamkhao Kiatpanthong	Onesongchai, Lumpinee Stadium	Bangkok, Thailand	Decision	5	3:00
1999-07-13	Win	(Thailand) Michael Sor.Sakulpan	Onesongchai, Lumpinee Stadium	Bangkok, Thailand	Decision	5	3:00
1999-04-23	Win	(Thailand) Nungubon Sitlerchai	Onesongchai, Lumpinee Stadium	Bangkok, Thailand	Decision (Unanimous)	5	3:00
Wins the Lumpinee Stadium Bantamweight (118 lbs) title.
1999-03-05	Loss	(Thailand) Nungubon Sitlerchai	Onesongchai, Lumpinee Stadium	Bangkok, Thailand	Decision (Split)	5	3:00
Loses the Lumpinee Stadium Bantamweight (118 lbs) title.
1999-02-05	Win	(Thailand) Pornpitak Phetudomchai	Onesongchai, Lumpinee Stadium	Bangkok, Thailand	Decision (Split)	5	3:00
Wins the Lumpinee Stadium Bantamweight (118 lbs) title.
1999-01-12	Win	(Thailand) Thongchai Tor.Silachai	Onesongchai, Lumpinee Stadium	Bangkok, Thailand	Decision	5	3:00
1998-12-15	Win	(Thailand) Chaichana Dechtawee	Fairtex, Lumpinee Stadium	Bangkok, Thailand	KO (Right cross)	1	
1998-10-26	Win	(Thailand) Sod Looknongyangtoy	Kiatsingnoi, Rajadamnern Stadium	Bangkok, Thailand	KO	1	
1998-09-12	Loss	(Thailand) Thongchai Tor.Silachai	Lumpinee Stadium	Bangkok, Thailand	Decision	5	3:00
Loses the Lumpinee Stadium Super Flyweight (115 lbs) title.
1998-07-21	Win	(Thailand) Neungsiam Fairtex	Thahansuea, Lumpinee Stadium	Bangkok, Thailand	Decision (Unanimous)	5	3:00
Wins the vacant Lumpinee Stadium Super Flyweight (115 lbs) title.
1998-07-13	Win	(Thailand) Srisatchanalai Sasiprapagym	Lumpinee Stadium	Bangkok, Thailand	Decision	5	3:00
1997-11-28	Loss	(Thailand) Ekachai Chaibadan	Onesongchai, Lumpinee Stadium	Bangkok, Thailand	Decision	5	3:00
For the vacant Lumpinee Stadium Flyweight (112 lbs) title.
1997-09-05	Win	(Thailand) Ekachai Or.Chaibadan	Onesongchai, Lumpinee Stadium	Bangkok, Thailand	Decision	5	3:00
1997-07-29	Loss	(Thailand) Ekachai Or.Chaibadan	Muaysiamphuea Yor.Yong, Lumpinee Stadium	Bangkok, Thailand	Decision	5	3:00
For a 760,000 baht side-bet.
1997-	Loss	(Thailand) Thongchai Tor.Silachai	Lumpinee Stadium	Bangkok, Thailand	KO (Punches)	3	2:33
1997-	Win	(Thailand) Khunpnit Kiattawan	Lumpinee Stadium	Bangkok, Thailand	KO	3	
1997-	Win	(Thailand) Hurricane Sor.Ploenchit	Lumpinee Stadium	Bangkok, Thailand	Decision	5	3:00
1997-	Win	(Thailand) Lukrokpet Kiattipramuk	Lumpinee Stadium	Bangkok, Thailand	Decision	5	3:00
1997-07-02	Win	(Thailand) Apidej Naratrikun	Jaomueangchon, Rajadamnern Stadium	Bangkok, Thailand	Decision	5	3:00
1997-06-06	Win	(Thailand) Hippo Sor.Wanchat	Lumpinee Stadium	Bangkok, Thailand	Decision	5	3:00
1997-05-15	Win	(Thailand) Pali Sor.Ploenchit	Jaomueangchon, Rajadamnern Stadium	Bangkok, Thailand	Decision	5	3:00
1997-	Win	(Thailand) Ekachai Chaibadan	Lumpinee Stadium	Bangkok, Thailand	Decision	5	3:00
1997-02-23	Loss	(Thailand) Terdthailak Nakontongparkview		Chachoengsao, Thailand	Decision	5	3:00
1997-01-31	Loss	(Thailand) Apidej Naratrikun	Lumpinee Stadium	Bangkok, Thailand	Decision	5	3:00
1996-	Win	(Thailand) Khunpinit Kiattawan	Lumpinee Stadium	Bangkok, Thailand	Decision	5	3:00
1996-	Win	(Thailand) Sagatpetch Kiatpramook	Lumpinee Stadium	Bangkok, Thailand	Decision	5	3:00
1996-	Win	(Thailand) Srisatchanalai Sasipraphagym	Lumpinee Stadium	Bangkok, Thailand	Decision	5	3:00
1995-12-08	Win	(Thailand) Hurricane Sor.Ploenchit	Lumpinee Stadium	Bangkok, Thailand	Decision	5	3:00
1995-09-26	Win	(Thailand) Phayaklek Sitjami	Lumpinee Stadium	Bangkok, Thailand	Decision	5	3:00
1995-04-04	Win	(Thailand) Biersot Saknirand	Onesongchai, Lumpinee Stadium	Bangkok, Thailand	Decision	5	3:00
1995-	Win	(Thailand) Pajonsuk Lukprabat		Bang Yai, Thailand	Decision	5	3:00
1994-12-14	Win	(Thailand) Pali Sitthianthong		Bang Yai, Thailand	Decision	5	3:00
1994-	Win	(Thailand) Payaklek Sor.Charoensuk		Bang Yai, Thailand	Decision	5	3:00
1994-	Win	(Thailand) Amornoi Sitphuangtong		Khon Kaen, Thailand	Decision	5	3:00
1994-	Win	(Thailand) Saifon Odsankha		Kalasin, Thailand	Decision	5	3:00
1988	Win			Thailand			
Saenchai's first ever fight. Won 30 Baht.
Legend: Win Loss Draw/No contest Notes

== Bare knuckle Muay Thai record ==
Professional record breakdown
1 match	0 wins	1 loss
By decision	0	1

Res.	Record	Opponent	Method	Event	Date	Round	Time	Location	Notes
Loss	0–1	Buakaw Banchamek	Decision (unanimous)	BKFC Thailand 5: Legends of Siam	November 4, 2023	5	2:00	Bangkok, Thailand	

== Professional boxing record ==
5 Fights 5 wins (2 (T)KOs) 0 Losses
Date	Result	Opponent	Location	Method	Round	Time
2004-04-02	Win	(Philippines) Joebar Damosmog	Chaiyaphum, Chaiyaphum Province, Thailand	KO	3	
2004-01-16	Win	(Philippines) Rud 4K Kevkatche	Bangkok, Thailand	Decision (unanimous)	12	3:00
Retains PABA interim Featherweight title.
2003-11-27	Win	(Philippines) Rud 4K Kevkatche	Lopburi, Lopburi Province, Thailand	Decision (unanimous)	12	3:00
Wins the vacant PABA interim Featherweight title.(1)
2003-10-10	Win	(Philippines) Pablo Boy Guevarra	Tha Tako, Nakhon Sawan, Thailand	KO	3	
2002-05-18	Win	(Philippines) Teofilo Tunacao	Bangkok, Thailand	Decision (unanimous)	8	3:00

== Name ==
In Muay Thai, professional boxers rarely perform under their birth name: After entering a training camp, they adopt the name of the camp as their last name, while (usually but not necessarily) keeping their first name. Throughout the career, they may change a training camp or a sponsor, changing their last name correspondingly. Saenchai used following 4 names as a professional fighter.

- Saenchai Sor Kamsing / Saenchai Sor.Kamsing
- Sangpetch Patanakan Gym
- Saenchai Sor Kingstar / Saenchai Sor.Kingstar
- Saenchai Sor Saenchai / Saenchai Sor.Saen

Sporting positions
Preceded by Saohin Srithai Condo	PABA Interim Featherweight Champion; November 27, 2003 – 2004	Succeeded by Saohin Srithai Condo
Preceded by Petchboonchu F.A. Group	Lumpinee Stadium Lightweight Champion; October 5, 2010–2011	Succeeded by N/A
Preceded by Petchboonchu F.A. Group	WMC World Lightweight Champion; October 5, 2010 – Jun 6,2011	Succeeded by Petchboonchu FA Group
