= Pakorn P.K. Saenchai Muaythaigym =

Thai professional Muay Thai fighter (born 1990)

Pakorn P.K.SaenchaiMuayThaiGym
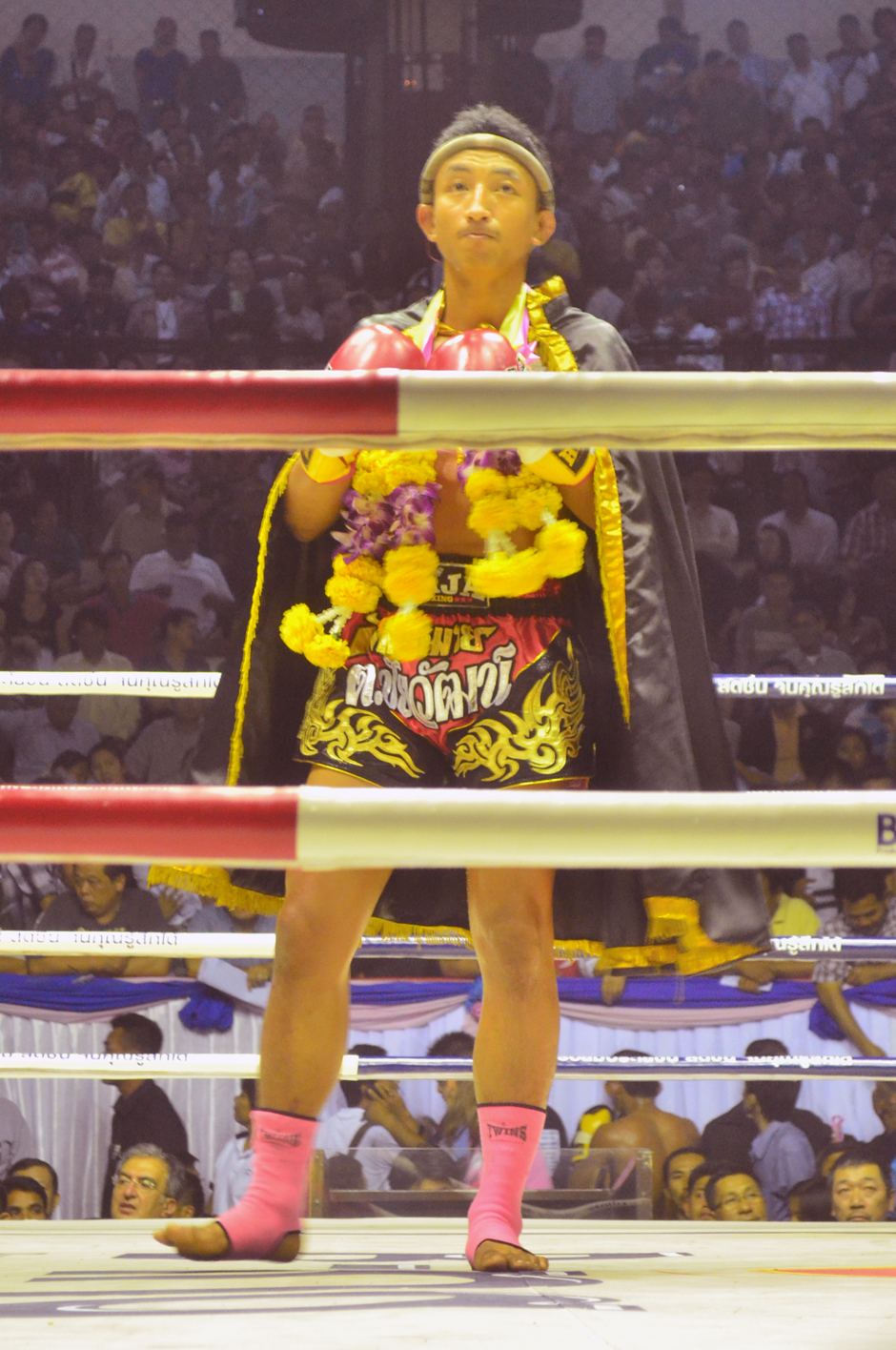
- Born: Pakorn Musiphon; August 14, 1990 (age 36); Phra Samut Chedi, Samut Prakan, Thailand
- Native name: ปกรณ์ มุสิผล
- Other names: Pakorn P.K.YokkaoSaenchai; Pakorn Sakyothin
- Height: 170 cm (5 ft 7 in)
- Division: Super Flyweight; Super Featherweight; Lightweight; Welterweight
- Style: Muay Thai (Muay Femur)
- Stance: Orthodox
- Fighting out of: Bangkok, Thailand
- Team: YOKKAO Training Center; Evolve MMA; P.K. Saenchai Muaythai Gym

Kickboxing record
- Total: 250
- Wins: 199
- By knockout: 18
- Losses: 46
- By knockout: 2
- Draws: 5

Other information
- Occupation: Muay Thai trainer

Pakorn Musiphon (Thai: ปกรณ์ มุสิผล; born August 14, 1990), known professionally as Pakorn P.K.SaenchaiMuayThaiGym (Thai: ปกรณ์ พี.เค.แสนชัยมวยไทยยิม), is a Thai professional Muay Thai fighter. He is a Lumpinee Stadium champion at Lightweight, a Rajadamnern Stadium champion at Super Flyweight, and a -65 kg Yokkao champion. He holds wins over fighters such as Sagetdao Petpayathai, Jomthong Chuwattana, Nong-O Kaiyanghadaogym, Pornsanae Sitmonchai and Kongsak Sitboonmee.

== Career ==
=== Muay Thai ===
Pakorn started training at the age of 9 and had his first fight a few months later, winning by decision. His father is a Muay Thai enthusiast and trained Pakorn until he joined the Sitphateang camp. Pakorn's first camp in Bangkok was Sakyothin, moving to Jitti Gym for a year and finally joining former opponent Saenchai PKSaenchaimuaythaigym's camp at the 13 Coins resort. Pakorn subsequently moved with Saenchai to the PK Saenchai Muay Thai Gym in Bangkok before joining Evolve MMA in October 2016.

In 2008, Pakorn won the Rajadamnern Stadium 115 lbs. title by beating Khaimukdam Chuwattana. In 2010, Pakorn fought Pornsanae Sitmonchai twice, once at Lumpinee Stadium and once at Rajadamnern Stadium, besting the aggressive former Rajadamnern Stadium champion on both occasions. Pakorn took on future Lumpinee Stadium champion Yodwicha Por Boonsit in 2012, with the fight ending in a draw. That same year he fought living legend and future teammate Saenchai PKSaenchaimuaythaigym in Glasgow, Scotland in what was Pakorn's first fight outside of Thailand. He lost the fight by decision after five rounds.

On December 5, 2013, Pakorn fought Kongsak Sitboonmee for the Thailand lightweight 135 lbs. title, winning the fight by decision. Three months later, on February 28, 2014, he took on Singdam Kiatmoo9 for the Lumpinee Stadium lightweight 135 lbs. title. Pakorn won the fight by decision. On June 14, 2014, Pakorn defeated Yetkin Özkul at Monte Carlo Fight Masters to win the WMC World Lightweight (-61.2 kg/135 lb) Championship. He defended his Lumpinee title on September 5, 2014, against Sagetdao Petpayathai, also winning this fight by decision. At Yokkao 11, held on October 11, 2014, Pakorn beat Englishman Greg Wootton for the promotion's -65 kg world title. Pakorn won the fight by decision after five rounds.

On 22 August 2017, YOKKAO Boxing announced that Pakorn would fight under the new name, Pakorn P.K. YOKKAO Saenchai Gym. He is currently under YOKKAO management and trains at the YOKKAO Training Center in Bangkok.

In April 2022 it was announced that Pakorn moved to Japan to become a Muay Thai trainer at Eiwa Sports Gym in Yokohama.

=== Lethwei ===
On December 29, 2019, in a very anticipated matchup, Pakorn faced multiple-times Lethwei World Champion, Soe Lin Oo under traditional Lethwei rules in Hpa-an, Karen state, Myanmar. Pakorn was cautious in the clinch to avoid the headbutts of the Burmese. In Round 4, while in the clinch, Soe Lin Oo floored Pakorn with a headbutt knockout and he was not able to continue.

== Titles and accomplishments ==
- Sports Authority of Thailand
  - 2013 Sports Authority of Thailand Fighter of the Year
- World Professional Muaythai Federation
  - 2022 WPMF World Welterweight (147 lbs) Champion
- Battle of MuayThai
  - 2022 BoM Welterweight (147 lbs) Champion
- Phoenix Fighting Championship
  - 2017 Phoenix Fighting Champion
- Thairath TV
  - 2016 ThairathTV's Welterweight (147 lbs) Champion
- World Kickboxing Union
  - 2016 WKU Welterweight (147 lbs) Champion
- YOKKAO
  - 2014 Yokkao -65 kg World Champion
- World Muaythai Council
  - 2014 WMC World Lightweight (135 lbs) Champion
- Lumpinee Stadium
  - 2014 Lumpinee Stadium Lightweight (135 lbs) Champion (2 defenses)
  - 2010 Lumpinee Stadium Fight of the Year (vs Pornsanae Sitmonchai)
- Professional Boxing Association of Thailand (PAT)
  - 2013 Thailand Lightweight (135 lbs) Champion
- Rajadamnern Stadium
  - 2008 Rajadamnern Stadium Super Flyweight (115 lbs) Champion

== Fight record ==
Muay Thai record
199 wins, 46 losses, 5 draws
Date	Result	Opponent	Event	Location	Method	Round	Time
2026-03-20	Win	(Thailand) Saeksan Or. Kwanmuang	ONE Friday Fights 147, Lumpinee Stadium	Bangkok, Thailand	TKO (3 Knockdowns)	1	0:59
2025-12-19	Win	(Thailand) Suablack Tor.Pran49	ONE Friday Fights 137, Lumpinee Stadium	Bangkok, Thailand	Decision (Unanimous)	3	3:00
2024-09-06	Loss	(Portugal) Fabio Reis	ONE Friday Fights 78, Lumpinee Stadium	Bangkok, Thailand	KO (Left hook to the body)	2	2:04
2024-06-28	Win	(France) Rafi Bohic	ONE Friday Fights 68, Lumpinee Stadium	Bangkok, Thailand	KO (right cross)	1	2:15
2024-03-24	Win	(Germany) Ali El Saleh	Road to LEGEND	Yokohama, Japan	TKO (Corner stoppage)	1	3:00
2023-09-03	Win	(Japan) Yuya Jonishi	TWOFC	Osaka, Japan	TKO (3 Knockdowns)	2	1:55
2023-06-10	Win	(Luxembourg) Prince Junior	KINGS OF MUAYTHAI	Gare, Luxembourg	Decision	3	3:00
2023-06-03	Win	(Japan) Daizo Sasaki	K-1 World GP 2023: inaugural Middleweight Championship Tournament	Yokohama, Japan	Ext.R Decision (Split)	4	3:00
2023-03-12	Win	(Japan) Hayato Suzuki	K-1 World GP 2023: K'Festa 6	Tokyo, Japan	Decision (Majority)	3	3:00
2022-12-17	Win	(Switzerland) Sébastien Fleury	Thaï Tournent 8	Switzerland	TKO (Knee)	2	0:45
2022-09-23	Win	(Japan) Yukimitsu Takahashi	The Battle of Muay Thai "OUROBOROS"	Tokyo, Japan	Decision	5	3:00
Wins the Battle of MuayThai and the vacant WPMF World Welterweight (147 lbs) titles.
2022-02-26	Win	(Algeria) Walid Otmane	Muay Thai Fighter X	Hua Hin, Thailand	Decision	5	3:00
2020-10-18	Win	(Zambia) Ahmed Badat	Thai Channel 8 Muay Thai Super Champ	Bangkok, Thailand	KO (Overhand Right)	2	
2020-08-15	Win	(Algeria) Yanis Mazouni	Thai Channel 8 Muay Hardcore	Bangkok, Thailand	KO (Left Hook)	1	0:44
2020-02-23	Loss	(France) Rafi Bohic	Authentic Mix Martial Arts	Phuket, Thailand	Decision	3	3:00
2019-12-15	Win	(Australia) Anthonie Frank	MX MUAY XTREME	Bangkok, Thailand	Decision (Unanimous)	3	3:00
2019-11-02	Loss	(Brazil) Julio Lobo	Maximum Muay Thai Fight	Brazil, São Paulo	Decision	5	3:00
2019-06-01	Win	(Japan) Yoshimichi Matsumoto	The Battle Of MuayThai SEASON II vol.2	Yokohama, Japan	Decision	5	3:00
2019-04-14	Win	(Japan) Ryota Nakano	The Battle Of MuayThai SEASON II vol.1	Yokohama, Japan	KO (Low kick)	2	
2019-01-27	Win	(Spain) Victor Conesa	All Star Fight	Thailand	Decision	3	3:00
2018-12-22	Win	(Russia) Aleksei Ulianov	Muaythai Factory	Russia	Decision (Unanimous)	5	3:00
2018-11-04	Win	(Canada) Will Romero	All Star Fight	Thailand	Decision	3	3:00
2018-07-01	Win	(Uzbekistan) Naimjon Tuhtaboyev	8 Super Champ	Thailand	Decision	3	3:00
2018-05-12	Loss	(Thailand) Satanfah Rachanon	THAI FIGHT Samui 2018	Ko Samui, Thailand	Decision	3	3:00
2018-03-24	Win	(Brazil) Noe Monteiro	THAI FIGHT Mueang Khon 2018	Nakhon Si Thammarat, Thailand	KO (Right Hook)	1	
2017-09-30	Win	(Ukraine) Igor Liubchenko	All-Star Fight 2	Bangkok, Thailand	Decision	3	3:00
2017-08-20	Win	(Brazil) Julio Lobo	All-Star Fight	Bangkok, Thailand	Decision	3	3:00
2017-04-29	Win	(France) Morgan Adrar	Phoenix Fighting Championship	Lebanon	Decision	5	3:00
Won the Phoenix Fighting Championship title.
2016-12-23	Loss	(Australia) Chadd Collins	MX MUAY XTREME	Bangkok, Thailand	Decision	5	3:00
2016-11-25	Win	(Uzbekistan) Bakhodirjon Bhoabdukodir	MX MUAY XTREME	Bangkok, Thailand	Decision (Unanimous)	3	3:00
2016-10-22	Win	(France) Rayan Mekki	La Nuit Des Challenges 16	France	Decision	3	3:00
2016-07-09	Win	(Thailand) Indrachai Chor.Haphayak	Yodmuay Thairath TV	Bangkok, Thailand	Decision	5	3:00
Won the Thairath TV Welterweight (147lbs) title.
2016-06-19	Win	(Slovakia) Marco Novak	Hanuman Cup 31	Slovakia	Decision	5	3:00
Won the WKU Welterweight (147 lbs) title.
2016-04-02	Win	(Thailand) Khaiwhanlek Tor Laksong	Yodmuay Thairath TV	Bangkok, Thailand	Decision	5	3:00
2016-03-05	Win	(China) Jin Ying	Wu Lin Feng	China	Decision	3	3.00
2016-02-20	Loss	(Thailand) Rittewada Sithikul	Siam Warriors	Ireland	Decision	5	3:00
2016-01-23	Loss	(China) Wei Rui	Wu Lin Feng 2016: World Kickboxing Championship in Shanghai	Shanghai, China	Decision	3	3.00
2015-12-27	Loss	(Japan) Tetsuya Yamato	Hoost Cup Kings Nagoya	Nagoya, Japan	Decision	5	3:00
2015-12-05	Loss	(China) Wei Rui	Wu Lin Feng World Championship 2015 – 63 kg Tournament, Semi Finals	Zhengzhou, China	Decision	3	3.00
2015-11-13	Win	(Argentina) Nicolas Vega	Yokkao 16	Argentina	Decision	3	3:00
2015-10-03	Win	(Russia) Aleksei Ulianov	Xtreme Muay Thai 2015	Macao	Decision	5	3:00
2015-09-05	Win	(China) Wang Wankun	Wu Lin Feng World Championship 2015 – 63 kg Tournament, Quarter Finals	Guangzhou, China	Decision	3	3:00
2015-09-05	Win	(China) Wang Zhiwei	Wu Lin Feng World Championship 2015 – 63 kg Tournament, First Round	Guangzhou, China	Decision	3	3:00
2015-07-28	Win	(Belarus) Dmitry Varats	TopKing World Series 4	Hongkong, China	Decision	3	3:00
2015-07-02	Win	(Thailand) Denpanom Ror Kilakorat	Rajadamnern Stadium	Bangkok, Thailand	Decision	5	3:00
2015-03-21	Win	(England) Liam Harrison	Yokkao 13	Bolton, England	Unanimous Decision	5	3:00
Defends the Yokkao 65kg title.
2015-01-08	Win	(Thailand) Auisiewpor Sujibamikiew	Rajadamnern Stadium	Bangkok, Thailand	Decision	5	3:00
2014-12-09	Win	(Thailand) Parnpetch Kiatjaroenchai	Lumpinee Stadium	Bangkok, Thailand	Decision	5	3:00
Defends the Lumpinee Stadium Lightweight (135 lbs) title.
2014-11-01	Win	(France) Jimmy Vienot	Top King Muay Thai	Belarus	KO (Punch)	1	
2014-10-26	Win	(Japan) Yasuyuki	REBELS	Japan	Decision	5	3:00
2014-10-11	Win	(England) Greg Wootton	Yokkao 11	Bolton, England	Decision	5	3:00
Wins the Yokkao -65kg World title.
2014-09-05	Win	(Thailand) Sagetdao Petpayathai	Lumpinee Stadium	Bangkok, Thailand	Decision	5	3:00
Defends the Lumpinee Stadium Lightweight (135 lbs) title.
2014-08-14	Loss	(Thailand) Nong-O Kaiyanghadaogym	Rajadamnern Stadium	Bangkok, Thailand	Decision	5	3:00
2014-07-16	Win	(Thailand) Nong-O Kaiyanghadaogym	Rajadamnern Stadium	Bangkok, Thailand	Decision	5	3:00
2014-06-14	Win	(Turkey) Yetkin Özkul	Monte Carlo Fighting Masters 2014	Monte Carlo, Monaco	Decision	5	3:00
2014-06-06	Win	(Brazil) Jos Mendonca		Macao, China	Decision	5	3:00
Wins the WMC World Lightweight (135 lbs) title.
2014-05-02	Win	(Thailand) Saeksan Or. Kwanmuang	Lumpinee Stadium	Bangkok, Thailand	Decision	5	3:00
2014-04-04	Loss	(Thailand) Saeksan Or. Kwanmuang	Songkla Southern Thailand	Thailand	Decision	5	3:00
2014-02-28	Win	(Thailand) Singdam Kiatmoo9	Lumpinee Stadium	Bangkok, Thailand	Decision	5	3:00
Won the vacant Lumpinee Stadium Lightweight (135 lbs) title.
2014-01-07	Loss	(Thailand) Petchboonchu FA Group	Lumpinee Stadium	Bangkok, Thailand	Decision	5	3:00
2013-12-05	Win	(Thailand) Kongsak sitboonmee	Lumpinee Stadium	Bangkok, Thailand	Decision	5	3:00
Won the vacant Thailand Lightweight (135 lbs) title.
2013-11-06	Win	(Thailand) Jomthong Chuwattana	Rajadamnern Stadium	Bangkok, Thailand	Decision	5	3:00
2013-10-08	Win	(Thailand) Petpanomrung Kiatmuu9	Lumpinee Stadium	Bangkok, Thailand	Decision	5	3:00
2013-09-11	Draw	(Thailand) Nong-O Kaiyanghadaogym	Rajadamnern Stadium	Bangkok, Thailand	Decision draw	5	3:00
2013-08-05	Win	(Thailand) Penake Sitnumnoi	Rajadamnern Stadium	Bangkok, Thailand	Decision	5	3:00
2013-07-09	Win	(Thailand) Sagetdao Petpayathai	Lumpinee Stadium	Bangkok, Thailand	Decision	5	3:00
2013-06-03	Loss	(Thailand) Penake Sitnumnoi	Rajadamnern Stadium	Bangkok, Thailand	Decision	5	3:00
2013-05-03	Draw	(Thailand) Nong-O Kaiyanghadaogym	Lumpinee Stadium	Bangkok, Thailand	Decision Draw	5	3:00
2013-04-05	Loss	(Thailand) Diesellek Aoodonmuang	Lumpinee Stadium	Bangkok, Thailand	Decision	5	3:00
2013-02-21	Win	(Thailand) Phetek Kiatyongyut	Rajadamnern Stadium	Bangkok, Thailand	Decision	5	3:00
2012-12-24	Win	(Thailand) Kongpet Lukboonmee	Rajadamnern Stadium	Bangkok, Thailand	Decision	5	3:00
2012-11-30	Win	(Thailand) Kongsiam Tor Pitakchai	Lumpinee Stadium	Bangkok, Thailand	KO(Knees to the body)	4	3:00
2012-11-10	Loss	(Thailand) Saenchai PKSaenchaimuaythaigym	Super Showdown 4	Glasgow, Scotland	Decision	5	3:00
2012-09-12	Draw	(Thailand) Yodwicha Por Boonsit	Rajadamnern Stadium	Bangkok, Thailand	Decision draw	5	3:00
2012-05-17	Win	(Thailand) Mongkolchai Kwaitonggym	Rajadamnern Stadium	Bangkok, Thailand	Decision	5	3:00
2012-02-28	Win	(Thailand) Kongsak sitboonmee	Lumpinee Stadium	Bangkok, Thailand	Decision	5	3:00
2012-01-26	Win	(Thailand) Kongsak sitboonmee	Rajadamnern Stadium	Bangkok, Thailand	Decision	5	3:00
2011-12-22	Loss	(Thailand) Wanchalerm Uddonmuang	Rajadamnern Stadium	Bangkok, Thailand	Decision	5	3:00
2011-08-18	Win	(Thailand) Jomthong Chuwattana	Rajadamnern Stadium	Bangkok, Thailand	Decision	5	3:00
2011-03-15	Loss	(Thailand) Kongsak Sitboonmee	Lumpinee Stadium	Bangkok, Thailand	Decision	5	3:00
2011-01-20	Win	(Thailand) Singtongnoi Por.Telakun	Rajadamnern Stadium	Bangkok, Thailand	TKO (Punches)	2	
2010-12-16	Win	(Thailand) Noppakrit Kor Kampanart	Rajadamnern Stadium	Bangkok, Thailand	Decision	5	3:00
2010-11-02	Win	(Thailand) Jomthong Chuwattana	Rajadamnern Stadium	Bangkok, Thailand	Decision	5	3:00
2010-10-05	Loss	(Thailand) Nong-O Kaiyanghadaogym	Lumpinee Stadium	Bangkok, Thailand	Decision	5	3:00
For the Lumpinee Stadium Super Featherweight (130 lbs) title.
2010-09-03	Win	(Thailand) Sittisak Petpayathai	Lumpinee Stadium	Bangkok, Thailand	Decision	5	3:00
2010-08-04	Win	(Thailand) Pinsiam Sor.Amnuaysirichoke	Rajadamnern Stadium	Bangkok, Thailand	Decision	5	3:00
2010-06-10	Win	(Thailand) Pornsanae Sitmonchai	Rajadamnern Stadium	Bangkok, Thailand	Decision	5	3:00
2010-05-07	Loss	(Thailand) Sam-A Kaiyanghadaogym	Lumpinee Stadium	Bangkok, Thailand	Decision	5	3:00
2010-03-05	Win	(Thailand) Pornsanae Sitmonchai	Lumpinee Stadium	Bangkok, Thailand	Decision	5	3:00
2010-02-11	Draw	(Thailand) Noppakrit Kor Kampanart	Rajadamnern Stadium	Bangkok, Thailand	Decision	5	3:00
2009-12-21	Win	(Thailand) Pettawee Sor Kittichai	Rajadamnern Stadium	Bangkok, Thailand	Decision	5	3:00
2009-11-26	Win	(Thailand) Khaimukkao Sit Or	Rajadamnern Stadium	Bangkok, Thailand	Decision	5	3:00
2009-10-08	Loss	(Thailand) Pettawee Sor Kittichai	Rajadamnern Stadium	Bangkok, Thailand	KO (Elbow)	3	
2009-09-10	Win	(Thailand) Thong Puideenaidee	Rajadamnern Stadium	Bangkok, Thailand	Decision	5	3:00
2009-08-06	Win	(Thailand) Rungruanglek Lukprabat	Rajadamnern Stadium	Bangkok, Thailand	Decision	5	3:00
2009-07-03	Loss	(Thailand) Sam-A Kaiyanghadaogym	Lumpinee Stadium	Bangkok, Thailand	Decision	5	3:00
2009-06-08	Loss	(Thailand) Singtongnoi Por.Telakun	Rajadamnern Stadium	Bangkok, Thailand	Decision	5	3:00
2009-05-07	Win	(Thailand) Pettawee Sor Kittichai	Rajadamnern Stadium	Bangkok, Thailand	Decision	5	3:00
2009-03-26	Draw	(Thailand) Pettawee Sor Kittichai	Rajadamnern Stadium	Bangkok, Thailand	Decision	5	3:00
2009-02-26	Win	(Thailand) Luknimit Singklongsi	Rajadamnern Stadium	Bangkok, Thailand	Decision	5	3:00
2009-01-14	Win	(Thailand) Thong Puideenaidee	Rajadamnern Stadium	Bangkok, Thailand	Decision	5	3:00
2008-11-27	Win	(Thailand) Thongchai Tor. Silachai	Rajadamnern Stadium	Bangkok, Thailand	Decision	5	3:00
2008-11-06	Loss	(Thailand) Chatchainoi GardenSeaview	Rajadamnern Stadium	Bangkok, Thailand	Decision	5	3:00
2008-10-09	Loss	(Thailand) Chatchainoi GardenSeaview	Rajadamnern Stadium	Bangkok, Thailand	Decision	5	3:00
2008-09-18	Loss	(Thailand) Chatchainoi GardenSeaview	Rajadamnern Stadium	Bangkok, Thailand	Decision	5	3:00
2008-08-07	Win	(Thailand) Khaimookdam Sit-O	Rajadamnern Stadium	Bangkok, Thailand	TKO	5	
2008-07-10	Win	(Thailand) Khaimookdam Sit-O	Rajadamnern Stadium	Bangkok, Thailand	Decision	5	3:00
Wins the Rajadamnern Stadium Super Flyweight (115 lbs) title.
2008-06-19	Win	(Thailand) Luknimit Singklongsi	Rajadamnern Stadium	Bangkok, Thailand	Decision	5	3:00
2008-05-01	Win	(Thailand) Kwanpichit Hor Pattanachai	Rajadamnern Stadium	Bangkok, Thailand	Decision	5	3:00
2008-03-26	Win	(Thailand) Hualampong NP Gym	Rajadamnern Stadium	Bangkok, Thailand	Decision	5	3:00
2008-01-30	Win	(Thailand) Harnchai Kiatyongyut	Rajadamnern Stadium	Bangkok, Thailand	Decision	5	3:00
2007-10-	Loss	(Thailand) Soodpatapee Dethrat	Rajadamnern Stadium	Bangkok, Thailand	Decision	5	3:00
For the vacant Rajadamnern Stadium Super Flyweight (115 lbs) title.
2007-07-04	Win	(Thailand) Palangpon Piriyanoppachai	Rajadamnern Stadium	Bangkok, Thailand	Decision	5	3:00
2007-06-07	Loss	(Thailand) Palangpon Piriyanoppachai	Rajadamnern Stadium	Bangkok, Thailand	Decision	5	3:00
2007-05-05	Win	(Thailand) Palangpon Piriyanoppachai	Rajadamnern Stadium	Bangkok, Thailand	Decision	5	3:00
2007-04-12	Win	(Thailand) Yodprabsuk Por Kumpai	Rajadamnern Stadium	Bangkok, Thailand	Decision	5	3:00
2007-02-14	Loss	(Thailand) Soodpatapee Dethrat	Rajadamnern Stadium	Bangkok, Thailand	Decision	5	3:00
2007-01-22	Win	(Thailand) Weruburuathai Saksomchai	Rajadamnern Stadium	Bangkok, Thailand	TKO	3	
2006-10-28	Win	(Thailand) Soodpatapee Dethrat	Onesongchai	Bangkok, Thailand	Decision	5	3:00
2006-09-25	Win	(Thailand) Sripatthanalek Kiat Por.Chaidet	Onesongchai, Rajadamnern Stadium	Bangkok, Thailand	Decision	5	3:00
2006-08-14	Win	(Thailand) Soodpatapee Dethrat	Rajadamnern Stadium	Bangkok, Thailand	Decision	5	3:00
2006-07-20	Win	(Thailand) Tee US Petrungsan	Rajadamnern Stadium	Bangkok, Thailand	Decision	5	3:00
2006-05-29	Win	(Thailand) Payaklak Sitsingthongnoi	Rajadamnern Stadium	Bangkok, Thailand	Decision	5	3:00
2006-04-06	Win	(Thailand) Naka Kaewsamrit	Rajadamnern Stadium	Bangkok, Thailand	Decision	5	3:00
2006-03-06	Loss	(Thailand) Naka Kaewsamrit	Rajadamnern Stadium	Bangkok, Thailand	Decision	5	3:00
2006-01-30	Loss	(Thailand) Palangchok Por Pitaksuntirath	Rajadamnern Stadium	Bangkok, Thailand	Decision	5	3:00
Legend: Win Loss Draw/No contest Notes

== Lethwei record ==
Professional Lethwei record
0 wins, 1 loss, 0 draws
Date	Result	Opponent	Event	Location	Method	Round	Time
2019-12-29	Loss	(Myanmar) Soe Lin Oo	Myanmar vs. Thailand Challenge Fights	Hpa-an, Myanmar	KO (Headbutt)	3	
Legend: Win Loss Draw/No contest Notes
