= Morgan Adrar =

French Muay Thai kickboxer

- Born: March 24, 1987 (age 39); Annecy, Auvergne-Rhône-Alpes, France
- Other names: "The Destroyer"
- Nationality: France
- Height: 1.78 m (5 ft 10 in)
- Weight: 67.0 kg (147.7 lb; 10.55 st)
- Division: Lightweight; Welterweight
- Style: Muay Thai
- Stance: Orthodox
- Fighting out of: France
- Team: Borrakseedam Muay Thai Gym

Kickboxing record
- Total: 59
- Wins: 46
- By knockout: 22
- Losses: 13
- Last updated on: August 11, 2020

Morgan Adrar (born March 24, 1987) is a French Lightweight Muay Thai kickboxer of Moroccan descent.

== Career ==
January 23, 2016 in Arbent, France Burning Series, Morgan Adrar defeated Mehdi Zatout win the 2016 WBC -67 kg World Championship belt.

== Championships and awards ==
Muay Thai

- WBC
  - 2016 WBC -67 kg World Championship
  - 2013 WBC -69.8 kg European Championship
- WMC
  - 2014 WMC -67 kg European Championship

== Fight record ==
Kickboxing record
46 wins (22 (T)KO's), 13 losses, 0 draws
Date	Result	Opponent	Event	Location	Method	Round	Time
2022-03-26	Loss	(Italy) Jordan Valdinocci	The Arena 4	Milan, Italy	Decision (Unanimous)	3	3:00
2020-01-19	Win	(France) Abdelnour Ali-Kada	All Star Muay-Thai Opéra II	Paris, France	Decision (Unanimous)	5	3:00
2019-12-14	Loss	(Belarus) Dmitry Varats	Golden Fight Tournament Semi Finals	Paris, France	Decision	3	
2019-06-29	Loss	(France) Valentin Thibaut	Arena Boxing	Fréjus, France	Decision	3	
2019-05-18	Win	(Turkey) Caner Kart	Phenix Boxing Only 7	Saint-Julien-en-Genevois, France	Decision (Unanimous)	5	3:00
2018-06-23	Win	(Italy) Samed Memaj	Burning Series 7	Bellegarde-sur-Valserine, France	KO	2	3:00
2017-06-29	Loss	(Thailand) Littewada Sitthikul	Best Of Siam XI	France	TKO	2	
2017-05-27	Loss	(France) Azize Hlali	Warriors Night	France	Decision	3	3:00
2017-04-29	Loss	(Thailand) Pakorn PKSaenchaimuaythaigym	Phoenix Fighting Championship	Lebanon	Decision	5	3:00
For the Phoenix Fighting Championship Title.
2017-01-28	Loss	(Thailand) Manaowan Sitsongpeenong	Burning Series 6	Paris, France	Decision	5	3:00
Losses the WBC -67kg World Title.
2016-12-10	Win	(Uzbekistan) Anvar Boynazarov	Phoenix Fighting Championship	Keserwan, Lebanon	Decision (Unanimous)	5	3:00
2016-10-29	Win	(Cambodia) Keo Rumchong	Best of Siam IX	Paris, France	Decision (Unanimous)	5	3:00
2016-06-17	Win	(China) Xing Xqiang	Wu Lin Feng	Zhengzhou, China	Decision (Unanimous)	5	3:00
2016-01-23	Win	(France) Mehdi Zatout	Burning Series	Arbent, France	Decision	3	3:00
Wins the WBC -67kg World Title.
2015-12-11	Loss	(France) Charles François (kickboxer)	Best Of Siam 7	Paris, France	Decision	5	3:00
2015-06-19	Loss	(Thailand) Changpuek MuaythaiAcademy	Best Of Siam 6	Paris, France	Decision	5	3:00
2015-03-07	Loss	(France) Jimmy Vienot	Ultimate Fight 2	France	Decision	5	3:00
2014-11-22	Loss	(Thailand) Saenchai	THAI FIGHT Khon Kaen	Khon Kaen, Thailand	Decision	3	3:00
2014-11-01	Win	(Cambodia) Pich Seiha	Apsara	Cambodia	Decision	5	3:00
2014-06-14	Win	(France) Azize Hlali	Best of Siam 5	France	Decision	5	3:00
2014-05-24	Loss	(France) Charles François (kickboxer)	Ring's Tiger 3	Chavelot, France	Decision	5	3:00
2014-04-05	Win	(Italy) Alessio Arduini	Gala de Privas	Privas, France	KO	2	
Wins the WMC -67kg European Title.
2014-1-25	Loss	(France) Bobo Sacko	La Ligue des Gladiateurs	Paris, France	Decision (Unanimous)	3	3:00
2013-10-23	Loss	(France) Azize Hlali	THAI FIGHT 2013: 1st Round - 67 kg Tournament Quarter-Final	Bangkok, Thailand	Decision	5	3:00
2013-05-25	Win	(France) Aziz Ali Kada	La Nuit Des Titans	Andrézieux-Bouthéon, France	TKO (Referee Stoppage)	5	
Wins the WBC -69.8kg European Title.
2013-02-23	Loss	(France) Yazid Boussaha	Lion Belt Fight Night 3	Belfort, France	Decision	5	3:00
2012-12-22	Win	(France) Murvin Babajee	Boxe Thaïlandaise	Arbent, France	TKO (Doctor Stoppage)	2	
2012-10-20	Loss	(Thailand) Rit Ubon	Roschtigrabe Derby	Uetendorf, Switzerland	Decision	5	3:00
2012-09-08	Win	(Switzerland) Christophe Pruvost	Grand Casino Baden Fight Night	Baden, Switzerland	KO (Left Uppercut)	2	
2012-04-28	Win	(France) Millon Bheran	Le Banner Series: acte 1	Genève, Switzerland	Decision	5	3:00
2012-03-31	Loss	(Thailand) Ruengsak Suchat	Boxe Thai Privas	Privas, France	Decision	5	3:00
2012-03-31	Win	(Morocco) Youssef El Hadmi	Boxe Thai Privas	Privas, France	Decision	5	3:00
2011-12-10	Win	(Thailand) Lopburi	International Fight Show 2011	Loano, Italy	TKO (Doctor Stoppage)	3	
2011-11-26	Win	(Italy) Eugeniu Deozu	Iron Fighter	Zoppola, Italy	KO (Right Cross)	2	
2011-10-01	Loss	(Thailand) Armin Pumpanmuang	Röschtigraben 2: Derby	Lausanne, Switzerland	TKO (cut)	2	
2011-06-25	Loss	(Morocco) Nordin Ben Moh	Superpro Fightnight	Bâle, Switzerland	TKO	2	
2011-05-21	Loss	(Thailand) Sak Kaoponlek	La Notte Dei Campioni	Seregno, Italy	TKO (Doctor Stoppage)	2	
2011-04-30	Win	(France) Jérémy Antonio	Boxe Thaïlandaise	Arbent, France	KO	1	
2011-02-26	Win	(Italy) Ivan Moscatelli	Boxe Thaïlandaise	Moirans, France	KO (Right Hook)	1	
2010-10-23	Win	(Switzerland) Joseph Pinto	Roschtigraben Derby	Uetendorf, Switzerland	Decision	5	3:00
2010-05-29	Win	(France) Seyed Bensaada	Boxe Thai Tournament IV	Thônex, Switzerland	KO	3	
Legend: Win Loss Draw/No contest Notes
