= Manasak Sor.Jor.Lekmuangnon =

Thai professional Muay Thai fighter

Manasak
- Born: Mana Samchaiyaphum; September 22, 1992 (age 34); Kantharawichai district, Thailand
- Other names: Manasak Sitniwat (มานะศักดิ์ ศิษย์นิวัฒน์)
- Height: 182 cm (6 ft 0 in)
- Weight: 63 kg (139 lb; 9 st 13 lb)
- Style: Muay Thai
- Stance: Orthodox
- Fighting out of: Bangkok, Thailand
- Team: Jitmuangnon; Sor.Jor.Lekmuangnon
- Trainer: Kulabkhao Na Nontachai

Mana Samchaiyaphum (Thai: มานะ สัมชัยภูมิ; born September 22, 1992), known professionally as Manasak Sor.Jor.Lekmuangnon (Thai: มานะศักดิ์ ส.จ.เล็กเมืองนนท์), is a Thai Muay Thai fighter.

== Career ==
Manasak started training in Muay Thai at the age of 10 with his father who used to compete under the name Chaiyaphum Sor.Chitlada.

On January 29, 2009, Manasak defeated Kiatchai Petchnongki by decision at the Rajadamnern Stadium for the Petchthongkam promotion.

On May 6, 2009, Manasak defeated Kongnakornban Sor.Kitrungroj by decision at the Rajadamnern Stadium for the Petchthongkam promotion.

On June 19, 2015, Manasak travelled to France to face Bobo Sacko at the Best of Siam VI event. He lost the fight by decision.

On October 13, 2015, Manasak faced Rittewada Sitthikul at the Lumpinee Stadium for the Phumphanmuang promotion. He lost the fight by decision.

On September 9, 2015, Manasak defeated Singdam Kiatmuu9 by decision in the Rajadamnern Stadium for the Wanmeechai promotion.

Manasak faced Rittewada Sitthikul in the Buriram province on January 22, 2016. He won the fight by referee stoppage in the last round of the fight.

On February 12, 2016, Manasak faced Saensatharn P.K. Saenchai Muaythaigym at the Lumpinee Stadium for the Petchkiatpetch promotion. He won the fight by third round knockout with an elbow.

On August 30, 2016, Manasak faced Saensatharn P.K. Saenchai Muaythaigym for the Thailand 147 lbs title in the Lumpinee Stadium under the Kiatpetch promotion. He won the fight by decision.

On April 29, 2017 Manasak faced Chadd Collins at THAI FIGHT Samui 2017. He won the fight by decision.

On September 7, 2017, Manasak faced Mason Goodwin at Samui Fight. He won the fight by technical knockout in the second round.

On March 8, 2018, Manasak lost by decision to Petchmorakot Wor.Sangprapai at the Rajadamnern Stadium.

== Titles and accomplishments ==
=== Professional ===
- Professional Boxing Association of Thailand (PAT)
  - 2016 Thailand Welterweight (147 lbs) Champion

=== Amateur ===
- International Federation of Muaythai Associations
  - 2017 IFMA World Championships -67 kg (silver)
- South East Asian Games
  - 2017 SEA Games Muay Thai -67 kg (gold)
- Asian Indoor and Martial Arts Games
  - 2017 Asian Indoor and Martial Arts Games Muay Thai -67 kg (silver)

== Muay Thai record ==
Professional Muay Thai record
Date	Result	Opponent	Event	Location	Method	Round	Time
2018-03-08	Loss	(Thailand) Petchmorakot Wor.Sangprapai	Rajadamnern Stadium	Bangkok, Thailand	Decision	5	3:00
2017-11-09	Loss	(Thailand) Petchmorakot Wor.Sangprapai	Rajadamnern Stadium	Bangkok, Thailand	Decision	5	3:00
2017-09-07	Win	(Australia) Damon Goodwin	Samui Fight	Ko Samui, Thailand	TKO (Knees)	2	
2017-04-29	Win	(Australia) Chadd Collins	THAI FIGHT Samui 2017	Ko Samui, Thailand	Decision	3	3:00
2016-12-09	Win	(Thailand) Petchmorakot Wor.Sangprapai	Lumpinee Stadium 60th Anniversary	Bangkok, Thailand	Decision	5	3:00
2016-10-06	Win	(Thailand) Petchmorakot Wor.Sangprapai	Wanmeechai, Rajadamnern Stadium	Bangkok, Thailand	Decision	5	3:00
2016-08-30	Win	(Thailand) Saensatharn P.K. Saenchai Muaythaigym	Kiatpetch, Lumpinee Stadium	Bangkok, Thailand	Decision	5	3:00
Wins the Thailand 147 lbs title.
2016-07-01	Win	(Thailand) Rittewada Sitthikul	80th Anniversary Commemoration Stadium	Nakhon Ratchasima, Thailand	Decision	5	3:00
2016-03-29	Loss	(Thailand) Yodwicha Por.Boonsit	Kiatpetch, Lumpini Stadium	Bangkok, Thailand	Decision	5	3:00
2016-02-12	Win	(Thailand) Saensatharn P.K. Saenchai Muaythaigym	Petchkiatpetch, Lumpinee Stadium	Bangkok, Thailand	KO (Elbow)	3	
2016-01-22	Win	(Thailand) Rittewada Sitthikul		Buriram, Thailand	TKO (Referee stoppage)	5	
2015-11-21	Win	(Thailand) Satanfah Rachanon		Uthai Thani, Thailand	Decision	5	3:00
2015-10-13	Loss	(Thailand) Rittewada Sitthikul	Phumphanmuang, Lumpinee Stadium	Bangkok, Thailand	Decision	5	3:00
2015-09-09	Win	(Thailand) Singdam Kiatmuu9	Wanmeechai, Rajadamnern Stadium	Bangkok, Thailand	Decision	5	3:00
2015-08-02	Win	(Thailand) Simanut Sor.Sarinya	Channel 7 Stadium	Bangkok, Thailand	Decision	5	3:00
2015-06-18	Loss	(France) Bobo Sacko	Best Of Siam 6	Tours, France	Decision (Unanimous)	5	3:00
2015-04-29	Loss	(Thailand) Saensatharn P.K. Saenchai Muaythaigym	Jitmuangnon, Rajadamnern Stadium	Bangkok, Thailand	Decision	5	3:00
2015-03-06	Win	(Thailand) Singdam Kiatmuu9	Lumpini Champion Krikkrai, Lumpinee Stadium	Bangkok, Thailand	TKO (Punch)	4	
2015-01-25	Win	(Thailand) PTT Petchrungruang	Rajadamnern Super Fight PPTV, Rajadamnern Stadium	Bangkok, Thailand	Decision	5	3:00
2014-11-30	Win	(Thailand) Diesellek Uddonmuang	Rajadamnern Stadium	Bangkok, Thailand	Decision	5	3:00
2014-10-06	Win	(Thailand) Chok Sagami	Petchaophraya, Rajadamnern Stadium	Bangkok, Thailand	Decision	5	3:00
2013-12-21	Win	(Thailand) Saensatharn P.K. Saenchai Muaythaigym	Omnoi Stadium, Weber Tournament	Samut Sakhon, Thailand	KO (Low kicks)	3	
2013-09-20	Win	(Thailand) Kriangkrai Tor.Silachai	OneSongchai	Yasothon province, Thailand	Decision	5	3:00
2013-06-01	Loss	(Thailand) Saensatharn P.K. Saenchai Muaythaigym	Omnoi Stadium	Samut Sakhon, Thailand	Decision	5	3:00
2013-04-12	Loss	(Thailand) Yodpayak Sitsongpeenong		Nakhon Ratchasima, Thailand	Decision	5	3:00
2012-11-16	Loss	(Thailand) Saensatharn P.K. Saenchai Muaythaigym	Paironan, Lumpinee Stadium	Bangkok, Thailand	KO (Left Knee)	3	
2012-08-18	Win	(Thailand) Tuanthong Pumpanmuang	Por.Petchkaikaew Gym	Hua Hin district, Thailand	Decision	5	3:00
2011-09-19	Loss	(Thailand) Kupee Kiatyongyut	Kiatyongyut, Rajadamnern Stadium	Bangkok, Thailand	KO	1	
2011-07-23	Loss	(Thailand) Berneung TopkingBoxing	Thailand vs Challenger 2011	Bangkok, Thailand	KO (Left Uppercut)	2	
2010-09-16	Loss	(Thailand) Kongnakornban Sor.Kitrungroj	Palangnum, Rajadamnern Stadium	Bangkok, Thailand	KO	4	
2010-08-04	Loss	(Thailand) Sittisak Petpayathai	Rajadamnern Stadium	Bangkok, Thailand	KO	4	
2010-06-10	Win	(Thailand) Mongkolchai Kwaitonggym	OneSongchai, Rajadamnern Stadium	Bangkok, Thailand	KO	3	
2010-01-13	Loss	(Thailand) Singtongnoi Por.Telakun	Onesongchai NBT, Rajadamnern Stadium	Bangkok, Thailand	KO	3	
2009-10-08	Loss	(Thailand) Singtongnoi Por.Telakun	Palangnum, Rajadamnern Stadium	Bangkok, Thailand	Decision	5	3:00
2009-09-10	Draw	(Thailand) Pettawee Sor Kittichai	Phettongkam, Rajadamnern Stadium	Bangkok, Thailand	Decision	5	3:00
2009-08-06	Win	(Thailand) Pornsanae Sitmonchai	Raja vs Lumpinee, Rajadamnern Stadium	Bangkok, Thailand	Decision	5	3:00
2009-06-27	Win	(Thailand) Phet-Ek Sitjaopho	Omnoi Stadium	Samut Sakhon, Thailand	Decision	5	3:00
2009-05-06	Win	(Thailand) Kongnakornban Sor.Kitrungroj	Petchthongkam, Rajadamnern Stadium	Bangkok, Thailand	Decision	5	3:00
2009-03-11	Win	(Thailand) Nueangjakkawan Sor.Suwannee	Phettongkham, Rajadamnern Stadium	Bangkok, Thailand	Decision	5	3:00
2009-01-26	Win	(Thailand) Kiatchai Petchnongki	Petchthongkam, Rajadamnern Stadium	Bangkok, Thailand	Decision	5	3:00
2008-05-29	Win	(Thailand) Yod Sor.Ploechit	Onesongchai, Rajadamnern Stadium	Bangkok, Thailand	Decision	5	3:00
Legend: Win Loss Draw/No contest Notes

Amateur Muay Thai Record
Date	Result	Opponent	Event	Location	Method	Round	Time
2017-09-21	Loss	(Turkmenistan) Mustafa Saparmyradow	2017 Asian Indoor and Martial Arts Games, Final	Ashgabat, Turkmenistan	Decision (30:27)	3	3:00
Wins 2017 Asian Indoor and Martial Arts Games Muay Thai -67kg Silver Medal.
2017-09-20	Win	(Iran) Reza Ahmadnejad	2017 Asian Indoor and Martial Arts Games, Semifinals	Ashgabat, Turkmenistan	Decision (30:27)	3	3:00
2017-09-19	Win	(Kazakhstan) Nikolay Samussev	2017 Asian Indoor and Martial Arts Games, Quarterfinals	Ashgabat, Turkmenistan	Decision (30:27)	3	3:00
2017-09-18	Win	(Iraq) Akram Hasan	2017 Asian Indoor and Martial Arts Games, First Round	Ashgabat, Turkmenistan	Decision (30:27)	3	3:00
2017-08-29	Win	(Malaysia) Tengku Sharizal Abd Rahman	2017 SEA Games Muay Thai Tournamaent, Final	Kuala Lumpur, Malaysia	Decision (30:27)	3	3:00
Wins 2017 SEA Games Muay Thai 67kg Gold Medal.
2017-08-28	Win		2017 SEA Games Muay Thai Tournamaent, Semifinals	Kuala Lumpur, Malaysia			
2017-05-12	Loss	(Belarus) Dmitry Varats	2017 IFMA World Championships, Final	Minsk, Belarus	RSCB	3	
Wins 2017 IFMA World Championships -67kg Silver Medal.
2017-05-10	Win	(Russia) Magomed Zaynukov	IFMA World Championships 2017, Semifinals	Minsk, Belarus	Decision (29:28)	3	3:00
Legend: Win Loss Draw/No contest Notes
