= Bobo Sacko =

French male kickboxer

- Born: 7 May 1988 (age 38); Le Mée-sur-Seine, France
- Nickname: "Panther"
- Height: 1.82 m (5 ft 11 1/2 in)
- Weight: 66 kg (146 lb; 10 st 6 lb)
- Style: Muay Thai
- Fighting out of: Le Mée-sur-Seine, France
- Team: Team Bilos Muay Thai Gym
- Trainer: Nicolas Subileau
- Years active: 2010 - present

Kickboxing record
- Total: 88
- Wins: 79
- By knockout: 30
- Losses: 8
- By knockout: 3
- Draws: 1

Bobo Sacko (born 7 May 1988) is a French Muay Thai fighter, who has been professionally competing since 2010. He is the current WMC Welterweight World champion. He is also the former WPMF Super Welterweight World champion. Sacko holds notable wins over Rafi Bohic, Liam Harrison, Jimmy Vienot and Petchboonchu FA Group.

== Muay Thai career ==
Sacko participated in the La Nuit des Titans four man welterweight tournament. He won a unanimous decisions against Jimmy Vienot in the semi-finals, and Petchboonchu FA Group in the final match.

Sacko fought Fabio Pinca during Warriors Night 4, losing the fight by a unanimous decision. Afterwards, he fought Yodwicha Banchamek during Best of Siam event organized in Paris. Sacko lost the fight by a unanimous decision.

On June 19, 2015, Sacko faced Manasak Sor.Jor.Lekmuangnon at the Best of Siam VI event. He won the fight by decision.

During the La Nuit des Titans 2016 event, Sacko fought Erkan Varol, winning the fight by a third round TKO.

In 2017 Sacko fought the former Rajadamnern Stadium and WMC champion Singmanee Kaewsamrit for the vacant WPMF World Welterweight title. Bobo won the fight by a unanimous decision.

He faced Changpuek Muaythai Academy during All Star Muaythai in February 2018, winning the fight by decision.

Bobo Sacko fought the former two time Lumpini Stadium champion Rafi Bohic during the Duel 3 event. Sacko won the fight by a unanimous decision.

He made his ONE Championship debut during ONE Championship: Immortal Triumph, being scheduled to face Kulabdam Sor.Jor.Piek-U-Thai. Sacko lost the fight by a unanimous decision.

Sacko fought for the WMC World Welterweight title against Chadd Collins. He won the fight by a unanimous decision.

== Championships and accomplishments ==
- Fédération française de kick boxing, muay thaï et disciplines associées
  - 2011 FFSCDA Welterweight Championship
- Fédération de Muaythaï et Disciplines Associées
  - 2011 FMDA Welterweight Championship
- La Nuit des Titans
  - 2015 La Nuit des Titans 4-Man Welterweight Tournament winner
- World Boxing Council Muaythai
  - 2012 WBC Muaythai French Welterweight Championship
  - 2014 WBC Muaythai European Welterweight Championship
  - 2022 WBC Muaythai International Welterweight Championship
- World Professional Muaythai Federation
  - 2017 interim WPMF World Super Welterweight Championship
  - 2013 WPMF European Welterweight Championship
- World Muaythai Council
  - 2019 WMC World Welterweight Championship

== Fight record ==
Professional Muay Thai and kickboxing record
79 wins (30 (T)KOs), 8 losses, 1 draw, 0 no contests
Date	Result	Opponent	Event	Location	Method	Round	Time
2025-12-13	Loss	(Portugal) Miguel Trindade	Glory Collision 8 - Last Featherweight Standing Second Round	Arnhem, Netherlands	Decision (unanimous)	3	3:00
2025-06-21	Win	(Netherlands) Jan Kaffa	Glory 101 - Last Featherweight Standing Opening Round	Yokohama, Japan	Decision (unanimous)	3	3:00
2025-04-19	Win	(Thailand) Dejrit Sitsongpeenong	Thai Boxing Showtime 7	Hazebrouck, France	Decision (unanimous)	5	3:00
2024-10-12	Win	(Germany) Denis Wosik	Glory 96	Rotterdam, Netherlands	Ext.R decision (split)	4	3:00
2024-04-27	Win	(Spain) David Mejia	Glory 91	Paris, France	KO (right hook)	1	0:55
2024-02-08	Win	(Italy) Badr Ghazi	Lidon vs Benzaquen	Paris, France	TKO (knee to the head)	2	1:24
2022-12-12	Win	(Republic of Ireland) Garrett Smylie	DEWT	Midoun, Tunisia	Decision (unanimous)	5	3:00
Wins the vacant WBC Muay Thai International Welterweight title.
2019-12-14	Win	(Australia) Chadd Collins	Golden Fight	Paris, France	Decision (unanimous)	5	3:00
Wins the vacant WMC World Welterweight title.
2019-02-20	Loss	(Thailand) Kulabdam Sor.Jor.Piek-U-Thai	ONE Championship: Immortal Triumph	Ho Chi Minh City, Vietnam	Decision (unanimous)	3	3:00
2019-02-20	Win	(Thailand) Fasai Chang Gym	All Star Muay Thai	Paris, France	KO	2	
2018-10-12	Win	(Thailand) Kriengkrai Sor Pongamorn	All Star Muay Thai	Aubervilliers, France	Decision (unanimous)	5	3:00
2018-04-08	Win	(France) Rafi Bohic	Duel 3	Paris, France	Decision (unanimous)	5	3:00
2018-02-27	Loss	(Thailand) Buakiew Sitsongpeenong	Best Of Siam XII, Lumpinee Stadium	Bangkok, Thailand	TKO (body kick)	4	
For the vacant WBC Muay Thai World Welterweight title.
2018-02-01	Win	(Thailand) Changpuek Muaythai Academy	All Star Muay-Thai	Paris, France	Decision (unanimous)	5	3:00
2017-09-12	Win	(United Kingdom) Liam Harrison	Golden Fight	Levallois-Perret, France	Decision (unanimous)	5	3:00
2017-05-13	Win	(Thailand) Singmanee Kaewsamrit	La Nuit Des Titans 4	Montereau-Fault-Yonne, France	Decision (unanimous)	5	3:00
Wins the interim WPMF World Super Welterweight title.
2017-03-4	Win	(Thailand) Kongfah Sitmonchai	Le Choc Des Légendes	Saint-Ouen-sur-Seine, France	TKO	4	
2016-03-12	Win	(Turkey) Erkan Varol	La Nuit des Titans	Tours, France	TKO (doctor stoppage)	3	
2015-12-11	Loss	(Thailand) Yodwicha Banchamek	Best Of Siam 7	Paris, France	Decision (unanimous)	5	3:00
2015-11-21	Loss	(France) Fabio Pinca	Warriors Night 4	Paris, France	Decision (unanimous)	5	3:00
2015-06-18	Win	(Thailand) Manasak Sor.Jor.Lekmuangnon	Best Of Siam 6	Tours, France	Decision (unanimous)	5	3:00
2015-05-16	Draw	(Spain) Marc Dass Rey	Heroes Fight Night	Berlin, Germany	Decision (unanimous)	5	3:00
2015-02-07	Win	(Thailand) Petchboonchu FA Group	La Nuit des Titans	Tours, France	Decision (unanimous)	3	3:00
Wins the La Nuit des Titans 4-Man Welterweight Tournament.
2015-02-07	Win	(France) Jimmy Vienot	La Nuit des Titans	Tours, France	Decision (unanimous)	3	3:00
2014-05-24	Win	(Italy) Mauro Serra	Thai Boxing Showtime 5	Hazebrouck, France	Decision (unanimous)	5	3:00
Wins the WBC Muaythai European Welterweight title.
2014-04-04	Win	(France) Charles François	Warriors Night	Paris, France	Decision (unanimous)	5	3:00
2014-01-25	Win	(France) Morgan Adrar	La Ligue des Gladiateurs	Paris, France	Decision (unanimous)	3	3:00
2013-11-15	Win	(Thailand) Lampard Sor Kamsing	Muaythai League	Paris, France	Decision (unanimous)	5	3:00
2013-10-11	Loss	(Ukraine) Sergey Kulyaba	Warriors Night	Issy-les-Moulineaux, France	KO	2	
2013-06-20	Loss	(Thailand) Phetasawin Seatranferry	Best Of Siam 4	Paris, France	Decision (unanimous)	5	3:00
2013-05-25	Win	(Spain) Jesus Cosa Aznar	Thai Boxing Showtime 4	Hazebrouck, France	KO (high kick)	1	
Wins the WPMF European Welterweight title.
2013-04-27	Win	(United Kingdom) Jason Woodham	No Pain, No Muay Thai	Andenne, Belgium	KO (elbow)	1	
2013-03-02	Win	(Thailand) Dek Bunjong	Warriors Night	Levallois-Perret, France	Decision (unanimous)	5	3:00
2012-11-22	Loss	(Thailand) Phetasawin Seatranferry	Best Of Siam 2	Paris, France	TKO (corner stoppage)	4	
2012-06-10	Loss	(France) Azize Hlali	TIME FIGHT: Event 2	Joué-lès-Tours, France	Decision (unanimous)	5	3:00
2012-06-14	Win	(France) Amadou Ba	Best Of Siam	Paris, France	KO (right cross)	3	
Wins the WBC Muaythai French Welterweight title.
2012-03-24	Win	(Belgium) Edgar Zuniga	Le Choc des Mondes VII	Bruay-sur-l'Escaut, France	Decision (unanimous)	5	3:00
2012-03-10	Win	(France) Seif Hajri	Le choc de Légendes	Saint-Ouen-sur-Seine, France	TKO	2	
2011-12-04	Win	(Thailand) Somchai Lieud Paidliu	King's Birthday	Bangkok, Thailand	KO	4	
2011-10-29	Win	(France) Lahoucine Idouchei	Gala de Muay Thaï	Saint-Étienne-du-Rouvray, France	Decision (unanimous)	5	3:00
2011-05-28	Win	(France) Fabrice Delannond	Finales Championnat National de Boxe Thai	Mondeville, Calvados, France	Decision (unanimous)	5	3:00
Wins the FMDA Welterweight title.
2011-05-07	Win	(France) Aurélien Baup	Finales Championnat De France Muaythai	Paris, France	Decision (unanimous)	5	3:00
Wins the FFSCDA Welterweight title.
2011-03-26	Win	(France) Murvin Babajee	1/2 Finales Championnat de France De Muaythai FFSCDA	Paris, France	Decision (unanimous)	5	3:00
2011-01-15	Win	(France) Olivier Guidicelli	Muay Thai à Vannes	Vannes, France	TKO	4	
2010-12-04	Win	(France) Kichima Yattabare	Championnat Ile De France	Paris, France	KO	2	
2010-10-29	Win	(France) Olivier Tchetche	France Vs Thaïlande : Mabel Vs Saiyoke	Paris, France	Decision (unanimous)	3	3:00
2010-06-12	Win	(Belgium) Allan Gozdzicki	Operation Muay Thai 3	Strasbourg, France	KO (knee to the body)	2	
Legend: Win Loss Draw/no contest Notes

== See also ==
- List of male kickboxers
