= Jimmy Vienot =

French Muay Thai fighter (born 1995)

- Born: June 9, 1995 (age 31); Montreuil, Seine-Saint-Denis, France
- Other names: Le Guépard; JVO1
- Height: 1.84 m (6 ft 1/2 in)
- Weight: 75 kg (165 lb; 12 st)
- Reach: 74 in (188 cm)
- Style: Muay Thai
- Fighting out of: Montpellier, France
- Team: Star Boxing, Max Sport Gym
- Trainer: Désiré Thibault

Kickboxing record
- Total: 77
- Wins: 53
- By knockout: 17
- Losses: 23
- By knockout: 1
- No contests: 1

Mixed martial arts record
- Total: 4
- Wins: 3
- By knockout: 2
- By decision: 1
- Losses: 1
- By decision: 1
- Last updated on: November 1, 2021

Jimmy Vienot (born June 9, 1995) is a French Muay Thai kickboxer who is the reigning SUPERKOMBAT World Middleweight Champion. He is a former Lumpinee Stadium and Arena Fight champion.

== Biography and career ==
=== Early career ===
Jimmy started Muay Thai at 13 years old in the Star Boxing gym of Montpellier, the city where he grew up since the age of 10. He chose Muay Thai after quitting Judo which lacked intensity to his taste. In 2012 and 2013 Jimmy became European champion in amateur competitions and established himself as one of the most promising French fighter. He should have competed in the IFMA 2014 World Championship but his trip wasn't funded because his gym didn't match the federation requirements.

Vienot made his professional debut during the summer of 2013 in Thailand and then in France in September where he showed he was already a force to be reckoned at 18 years old by winning a one night tournament. A month later Jimmy engaged himself in the Fight tournament and was eliminated in the semi-final by Ruslan Kushnirenko in a controversial decision. Three weeks later Vienot fought for his first world title against Singmanee Kaewsamrit, he lost by decision.

After racking up wins on the French scene against top fighters like Rafi Bohic and Gaetan Dambo, Jimmy entered the July 2017 Toyota Marathon tournament where he faced thai legend Petchboonchu FA Group in the semi-final. He lost the fight but was very happy with the experience he gained.

Jimmy was eliminated in the first round of the 2014 IFMA European Championship by Itay Gershon. He was asked to be in a super fight for the closing ceremony of the event, he lost a decision to hometown fighter Oskar Stazska.

On November 15 Jimmy suffered the first and only knockout loss of his career when he faced thai champion Pakorn PKSaenchaimuaythaigym in the Topking World Series event. Pakorn landed a left hook that made Jimmy faceplant in the first round.

After losing to Bobo Sacko in a fight at the top of the French scene, Jimmy had a 17-3 record during 2015 and 2016. Only losing to Thai champions Chanajon and twice to top fighter Yodwicha Por Boonsit. His last fight of 2016 saw him win his first world title when he knocked out Brazilian champion Jose Neto in the second round with an elbow. Two months later Vienot won his second world title, the WBC belt against Denpanom Kirakorat at the legendary Rajadamnern Stadium.

=== GLORY ===
During 2017-2018 Vienot continued his ascension in Muay Thai winning the All Star Muay Thai one night tournament and winning a third world title against thai champion Sorgraw Petchyindee in late 2018. He also went back to amateur competition and won the IFMA European title. Vienot diversified himself during that time taking fights in kickboxing rules against top fighters like Mohamed Hendouf, Wilson Varela and signing with Glory kickboxing to face champion and title challenger Cedric Doumbe and Alim Nabiev.

=== Muay Thai ===
In April 2019 Vienot became the fourth non thai fighter to win the Lumpinee Stadium title, beating Talaytong Sor.Thanaphet by decision. Following that win Vienot had his biggest kickboxing rules success yet a month later by beating Vedat Hödük for the newly created Arena Fight title.

In August 2019 Vienot won the IFMA World championship and received the award for "Best athlete" of the competition.

Vienot faced Yodwicha Banchamek for the vacant WMC Middleweight Championship at Empire Fight: Vikings Edition on October 2, 2021. He won by decision.

=== SUPERKOMBAT ===
In the fall of 2021, Vienot signed with the Superkombat Fighting Championship. He made his promotional debut at Superkombat Universe on November 1, 2021, against Arman Ambaryan for the world middleweight title. He won the fight by unanimous decision.

=== ONE Championship ===
Vienot made his ONE Championship debut at ONE 157 on May 20, 2022, where he faced Petchmorakot Petchyindee Academy for the ONE Featherweight Muay Thai World Championship. He lost the fight by split decision.

Vienot faced Niclas Larsen at ONE 162 on October 21, 2022. He won the fight by unanimous decision.

On March 18, 2023, in Nice, France Vienot lost to Youssef Assouik by unanimous decision during a defense of his WMC World 160 lbs title. After this defeat Vienot announced that his Muay Thai career was done and that he would focus on mixed martial arts from this point on.

== Mixed martial arts career ==
Vienot made his mixed martial arts debut on September 3, 2021 at UAE Warriors 22 against Daniel Donchenko. He won the fight by decision.

=== ARES Fighting Championship ===
On March 1, 2023, it was announced that Vienot had signed with ARES Fighting Championship and would make his promotional debut on May 11, 2023.

== Titles and accomplishments ==
=== Amateur ===
- World Muaythai Federation
  - 2012 WMF European Junior -67 kg Champion
- International Federation of Muaythai Associations
  - 2013 IFMA European Championships Junior -71 kg (gold)
  - 2018 IFMA European Championships -75 kg (gold)
  - 2018 IFMA European Championship Best Athlete
  - 2019 IFMA World Championships -75 kg (gold)
  - 2019 IFMA World Championship Best Athlete
  - 2019 IFMA European Championships -75 kg (gold)
  - 2021 IFMA World Championships -71 kg (gold)

=== Professional ===
- 2014 France Muay Thai Champion
- World Professional Muaythai Federation
  - 2016 WPMF World -72.5 kg Champion
- World Boxing Council Muay Thai
  - 2017 WBC Muay Thai World -72.5 kg Champion
- World Muay Thai Council
  - 2018 WMC World -160 lbs Champion (two defenses)
  - 2021 WMC World -154 lbs Champion
- Lumpinee Stadium
  - 2019 Lumpinee Stadium Middleweight (160 lbs) Champion
- Arena Fight
  - 2019 Arena Fight K-1 -75 kg Champion
- Superkombat Fighting Championship
  - 2021 Superkombat World -70 kg Champion

== Mixed martial arts record ==
Professional record breakdown
4 matches	3 wins	1 loss
By knockout	2	0
By submission	0	0
By decision	1	1

Res.	Record	Opponent	Method	Event	Date	Round	Time	Location	Notes
Win	3–1	Josenildo Pantoja	TKO (punches)	Ares FC 43	September 25, 2026	1	0:48	Paris, France	
Loss	2–1	Mario Gagliardi	Decision (unanimous)	Ares FC 39	April 3, 2026	3	5:00	Bordeaux, France	
Win	2–0	Alessio D'Auria	KO (punch)	Ares FC 36	December 13, 2025	3	1:30	Paris, France	
Win	1–0	Daniel Donchenko	Decision (unanimous)	UAE Warriors 22	3 September 2021	3	3:00	Abu Dhabi, United Arab Emirates	Lightweight debut.

== Kickboxing and Muay Thai record ==
Muay Thai record
53 Wins (17 (T)KO's), 24 Losses, 1 No Contest
Date	Result	Opponent	Event	Location	Method	Round	Time
2025-04-19	Win	(Thailand) Win Fairtex	Thai Boxing Showtime 7	Hazebrouck, France	KO (Elbow)	4	
2024-06-28	Loss	(Thailand) Shadow Singmawynn	ONE Friday Fights 68	Bangkok, Thailand	Decision (Unanimous)	3	3:00
2023-03-18	Loss	(Denmark) Youssef Assouik	Nice Fight Night 10	Nice, France	Decision (unanimous)	5	3:00
Loses the WMC World Middleweight (160 lbs) title.
2022-10-21	Win	(Denmark) Niclas Larsen	ONE 162	Kuala Lumpur, Malaysia	Decision (unanimous)	3	3:00
2022-05-20	Loss	(Thailand) Petchmorakot Petchyindee Academy	ONE 157	Kallang, Singapore	Decision (split)	5	3:00
For the ONE Muay Thai Featherweight Championship
2021-11-01	Win	(Belgium) Arman Hambaryan	Superkombat Universe	Dubai, UAE	Decision (unanimous)	5	3:00
Won the vacant Superkombat World Middleweight Championship.
2021-10-02	Win	(Thailand) Yodwicha Banchamek	Empire Fight - Vikings Edition	Montbéliard, France	Decision (Split)	5	3:00
Wins the vacant WMC World -70kg title.
2020-03-07	Win	(Italy) Saro Presti	Nice Fight Night	Nice, France	TKO (Corner stoppage)	3	
2020-02-08	Win	(Thailand) Chanajon P.K. Saenchai Muaythaigym	Empire Fight	France	Decision	5	3:00
Defends WMC World Middleweight (160 lbs) title.
2019-09-25	Loss	(Thailand) Sorgraw Petchyindee	Lumpinee Stadium	Bangkok, Thailand	Decision	5	3:00
Lost the Lumpinee Stadium Middleweight (160 lbs) title.
2019-06-08	Win	(Turkey) Vedat Hödük	Arena Fight	Aix en Provence, France	Decision	5	3:00
Wins Arena Fight K-1 -75kg title.
2019-04-30	Win	(Thailand) Talaytong Sor.Thanaphet	Lumpinee Stadium	Bangkok, Thailand	Decision	5	3:00
Wins the vacant Lumpinee Stadium Middleweight (160 lbs) title.
2019-02-20	Win	(Thailand) Dabmoon Sia Chot Bangsean	All Star Muay Thai	Paris, France	KO	1	
2018-12-01	NC	(Israel) Ilya Grad	Credissimo Golden Fight	France	No Contest (doctor stoppage)	1	
Defends the WMC World Middleweight (160 lbs) title.
2018-10-20	Loss	(France) Cedric Doumbe	Glory 60: Lyon	Lyon, France	Decision (Unanimous)	3	3:00
2018-09-22	Win	(Cape Verde) Wilson Varela	Le Trophée Des Etoiles, Final	Aix en Provence, France	Decision	3	3:00
2018-09-22	Win	(Italy) Ivan Naccari	Le Trophée Des Etoiles, Semi Final	Aix en Provence, France	Decision	3	3:00
2018-08-23	Win	(Thailand) Sorgraw Petchyindee	Best Of Siam XIII Rajadamnern Stadium	Bangkok, Thailand	Decision (Split)	5	3:00
Wins WMC World Middleweight (160 lbs) title.
2018-05-05	Win	(Thailand) Noppakao Sor Sirliluck	Capital Fights 3	Paris, France	KO	2	
2018-03-03	Loss	(Netherlands) Eyevan Danenberg	Glory 51: Rotterdam	Utrecht, Netherlands	Decision (Split)	3	3:00
2018-02-01	Win	(Spain) Edye Ruiz	All Star Muay-Thai, Final	Paris, France	Decision	3	3:00
2018-02-01	Win	(Portugal) Adelino Boa Morte	All Star Muay-Thai, Semi Final	Paris, France	Decision	3	3:00
2018-01-06	Win	(Netherlands) Serginio Kanters	Kerner Thai	Paris, France	Decision	5	3:00
2017-11-17	Loss	(France) Hamza Ngoto	Warriors Night	Paris, France	Decision	5	3:00
2017-10-28	Loss	(Azerbaijan) Alim Nabiev	Glory 47: Lyon	Lyon, France	Decision (split)	3	3:00
2017-09-23	Loss	(Belgium) Mohamed Hendouf	Extreme Fight For Heroes 5	France	Decision	3	3:00
2017-05-27	Loss	(Thailand) Chanajon P.K. Saenchai Muaythaigym	Warriors Night	Paris, France	Decision	5	3:00
2017-03-18	Loss	(Thailand) Rungrawee Kietpatharapan	La Nuit Des Titans	Tours, France	Decision	5	3:00
2017-02-23	Win	(Thailand) Denpanom Kirakorat	Best Of Siam X Rajadamnern Stadium	Bangkok, Thailand	KO (Elbow)	3	
Wins WBC Muay Thai World -72.5kg title.
2017-01-28	Win	(Thailand) Sudsakorn Sor Klinmee	Thai Boxe Mania 2017	Italy	Decision	3	3:00
2016-12-04	Win	(Brazil) Jose Neto	WPMF King's Birthday	Bangkok, Thailand	KO (Right Hook)	2	
Wins WPMF World -72.5kg title.
2016-11-19	Win	(China) Hu Yafey	WLF Rise Of Heroes Switzerland	Switzerland	TKO (Forfeit)	1	
2016-10-29	Win	(Thailand) Tengnueng Sitjaesairoong	Best Of Siam IX	France	Decision	5	3:00
2016-10-08	Win	(France) Mustapha Yasar	World GBC Tour 11	France	KO	1	
2016-09-17	Win	(Thailand) Yodpayak Sitsongpeenong	Wicked One Duel	Paris, France	Decision	5	3:00
2016-08-26	Win	(France) Gaetan Dambo	Elite War Night	France	Decision	5	3:00
2016-06-11	Loss	(Thailand) Yodwicha Por Boonsit	Warriors Night 5	Paris, France	Decision	5	3:00
2016-04-30	Win	(France) Johane Beausejour	Kerner Thai	Paris, France	Decision	5	3:00
2016-03-26	Win	(Italy) Christian Zahe	Master Fight	France	TKO	3	
2016-02-13	Win	(France) Mohamed Souane	La Nuit des Titans	Tours, France	Decision	5	3:00
2016-02-13	Win	(France) Yazid Boussaha	Stars Night	France	Decision	5	3:00
2015-12-11	Loss	(Thailand) Chanajon P.K. Saenchai Muaythaigym	Best Of Siam 7	Paris, France	Decision	5	3:00
2015-10-17	Win	(Thailand) Nilmungkorn Sudsakorngym	Max Muay Thai	Pattaya, Thailand	KO (Right cross)	2	0:15
2015-10-17	Win	(Belarus) Dmitry Varats	Topking World Series	China	Decision	3	3:00
2015-09-20	Win	(Spain) Nayanesh Ayman	Topking World Series	Laos	Decision	3	3:00
2015-08-04	Loss	(Thailand) Yodwicha Por Boonsit	Fight Night Saint-Tropez	Saint Tropez, France	Decision	5	3:00
2015-03-19	Win	(France) Guimba Coulibaly	Best Of Siam 6	Paris, France	TKO	3	
2015-05-23	Win	(Switzerland) Christophe Pruvost	Radikal Fight Night 3	France	Decision	5	3:00
2015-04-04	Win	(France) Kaiss Najm	Lion Belt 5	France	Decision	5	3:00
2015-03-07	Win	(France) Morgan Adrar	Ultimate Fight 2	France	Decision	5	3:00
2015-02-07	Loss	(France) Bobo Sacko	La Nuit des Titans, Semi Final	Tours, France	Decision	3	3:00
2014-11-01	Loss	(Thailand) Pakorn PKSaenchaimuaythaigym	Top King Muay Thai	Belarus	KO (Punch)	1	
2014-10-23	Loss	(France) Abdallah Mabel	A1 WCC Lyon, Semi Finals	Lyon, France	DQ (Ref. Stop./Three warning)		
2014-09-28	Loss	(Poland) Oskar Staszka	2014 IFMA European Championship, Closing Ceremony Super Fight	Poland	Decision	3	3:00
2014-09-07	Loss	(Thailand) Jingreedtong Seatransferry	Max Muay Thai	Pattaya, Thailand	Decision	5	3:00
2014-08-20	Win	(Australia)	MBK Fight Night	Bangkok, Thailand	KO	1	
2014-07-25	Loss	(Thailand) Petchboonchu FA Group	Toyota Marathon, Semi finals	Bangkok, Thailand	Decision	3	3:00
2014-07-25	Loss	(Russia) Dima Demakov	Toyota Marathon, Quarter finals	Bangkok, Thailand	Decision	3	3:00
2014-06-27	Loss	(France) Gaetan Dambo	Les Arts du Respect, Semi Final	Nice, France	Decision	5	3:00
2014-06-07	Win	(France) Rafi Bohic	Gala du Phenix Muaythai 6	France	Decision	5	3:00
2014-04-24	Win	(France) Lahoucine Idouche	Thai Boxing Showtime 5	France	Decision	3	3:00
2014-04-19	Loss	(France) Mohamed Houmer	LFC#3	France	Decision	3	3:00
2014-04-12	Win	(France) Cédric Colombo	Championnat De France FMDA	Paris, France	KO	2	
Wins France Muay Thai title
2014-03-08	Win	(France) Mickael Francoise	Le Choc des Légendes	France	KO	3	
2014-02-15	Win	(France) Christopher Wyckaert	WICKED ONE Tournament #4	Paris, France	TKO	2	
2013-12-27	Loss	(Thailand) Singmanee Kaewsamrit	Klongsarn	Bangkok, Thailand	Decision	5	3:00
For the WPMF World -67kg title
2013-11-30	Loss	(Ukraine) Ruslan Kushnirenko	THAI FIGHT 2013 - 1/2 Finals	Bangkok, Thailand	Decision	3	3:00
2013-10-23	Win	(Brazil) Adaylton Freitas	THAI FIGHT 2013 - 1/4 Finals	Bangkok, Thailand	TKO		
2013-09-28	Win	(France) Michael Vieillard	Thai Tournament 6, Final	Switzerland	Decision	3	3:00
2013-09-28	Win	(France) Jamal Wahib	Thai Tournament 6, Semi Final	Switzerland	Decision	3	3:00
2013-07	Win	(Thailand)		Bangkok, Thailand	KO (Low kick)		
Legend: Win Loss Draw/No contest Notes

Amateur Muay Thai record (Incomplete)
Date	Result	Opponent	Event	Location	Method	Round	Time
2025-05-30	Loss	(Italy) Domenico Caravello	2025 IFMA World Championships, Quarterfinals	Kemer, Turkey	KO (High kick)	2	
2021-12-11	Win	(Belarus) Andrei Kulebin	2021 IFMA World Championships, Final	Bangkok, Thailand	Decision (Unanimous)	3	
Wins 2021 IFMA World Championships -71kg Gold Medal.
2021-12-10	Win	(Thailand) Thananchai Rachanon	2021 IFMA World Championships, Semi Finals	Bangkok, Thailand	Decision	3	
2021-12-09	Win	(Lithuania) Mindaugas Narauskas	2021 IFMA World Championships, Quarter Finals	Bangkok, Thailand	Decision	3	
2021-12-09	Win	(Hungary) Henrik Koczo	2021 IFMA World Championships, Round 2	Bangkok, Thailand	Decision	3	
2019-11-10	Win	(Russia) Denis Kolotygin	2019 IFMA European Championship, Final	Minsk, Belarus	Decision (Unanimous)	3	3:00
Wins 2019 IFMA European Championships -75kg Gold Medal.
2019-11-08	Win	(Belarus) Vitaly Gurkov	2019 IFMA European Championship, Semi Finals	Minsk, Belarus	Decision (Split)	3	3:00
2019-11-05	Win	(Spain) Nayanesh Parikh Bumba	2019 IFMA European Championship, Quarter Finals	Minsk, Belarus	Decision	3	3:00
2019-07-28	Win	(Ukraine) Volodymyr Borishev	2019 IFMA World Championship, Final	Bangkok, Thailand	Decision	3	3:00
Wins 2019 IFMA World Championship -75kg Gold Medal.
2019-07-26	Win	(Spain) Nayanesh Parikh	2019 IFMA World Championship, Semi Final	Bangkok, Thailand	Decision	3	3:00
2019-07-25	Win	(Turkey) Enis Yunusoglu	2019 IFMA World Championship, Quarter Final	Bangkok, Thailand	Decision	3	3:00
2019-07-24	Win	(Peru) Giovanni Mazzetti	2019 IFMA World Championship, Second Round	Bangkok, Thailand	KO (High Kick)	3	
2019-07-23	Win	(Estonia) Karl-Joonatan Kvell	2019 IFMA World Championship, First Round	Bangkok, Thailand	TKO (Knee)	1	
2018-07-07	Win	(Belarus) Vitaly Gurkov	2018 IFMA European Championship, Final	Czech Republic	Decision	3	3:00
Wins 2018 IFMA European Championship -75kg Gold Medal.
2018-07-04	Win	(Ukraine) Stanislav Perzhanovskyi	2018 IFMA European Championship, Semi Final	Czech Republic	Decision	3	3:00
2018-07-02	Win	(Lithuania) Martynas Jasiunas	2018 IFMA European Championship, Quarter Finals	Czech Republic	Decision	3	3:00
2018-07-01	Win	(Austria) Christian Lochner	2018 IFMA European Championship, 1/8 Finals	Czech Republic	Decision	3	3:00
2014-09-27	Loss	(Israel) Itay Gershon	2014 IFMA European Championship, First Round	Poland	Decision	3	3:00
2014-01-26	Win	(France) Anthony Gazel		France	Decision	3	3:00
2013-07-28	Win	(Lithuania) Martynas Jasiunas	2013 IFMA European Championship, Final	Portugal	Decision	3	3:00
Wins 2013 IFMA European Junior -71kg title
2013-07-27	Win	(Czech Republic) Krystof Mares	2013 IFMA European Championship, Semi Final	Portugal	KO (Low kick)	3	
2013-05-25	Win	(France) Kevin Llorens	Final Fight	Cèze, France	KO		
2012-09	Win	(United Kingdom) Terry Tucker	2012 WMF European Championship	Bulgaria	KO (High kick)		
Wins 2012 WMF European Junior -67kg title
Legend: Win Loss Draw/No contest Notes

== See also ==
- List of male kickboxers
