= Burak Poyraz =

Turkish Muay Thai Kickboxer (born 1995)

- Born: Burak Poyraz; September 15, 1995 (age 31); Bergama, İzmir, Turkey
- Nationality: Turkish
- Height: 187 cm (6 ft 2 in)
- Weight: 69.9 kg (154 lb; 11 st 0 lb)
- Division: Super welterweight
- Style: Kickboxing; Muay Thai
- Fighting out of: Turkey
- Years active: 2014-present

Kickboxing record
- Total: 38
- Wins: 31
- By knockout: 7
- Losses: 7

Burak Poyraz (born September 15, 1995; in Bergama), is a Turkish Muaythai Kickboxer. He challenged for the interim Rajadamnern Stadium Super Welterweight title against Yodwicha Por.Boonsit.

== Sports career ==
=== Rajadamnern World Series ===
On March 5, 2023, Poyraz faced Yodwicha Por.Boonsit for the interim Rajadamnern Stadium Super Welterweight title and lost by unanimous decision.

On July 1, 2023, Poyraz lost Shadow Singha Mawynn by unanimous decision in the Rajadamnern World Series.

On August 10, 2023, Poyraz lost Petchmorakot Petchyindee Academy by unanimous decision in the Rajadamnern World Series.

On September 16, 2023, Poyraz lost Satanfah Rachanon by unanimous decision in the Rajadamnern World Series super fight.

On October 10, 2024, Poyraz defend Yodpayak Sitsongpeenong by unanimous decision in the Rajadamnern World Series super fight.

On November 9, 2024, Poyraz defend Talaytong Sor.Thanaphet by unanimous decision in the Rajadamnern World Series super fight.

== Titles and accomplishments ==
Amateur

- World Association of Kickboxing Organizations
  - (gold) 2017 WAKO 60 kg Turkish championships
  - (gold) 2017 WAKO 63 kg Turkish championships

== Fight record ==
Professional Muay Thai record
31 Wins (7 (T)KO's), 7 Losses, 0 Draw
Date	Result	Opponent	Event	Location	Method	Round	Time
2026-11-28		(Romania) Denis Nicolaevici Tapu	EliteBet Max Fight Championship 67	Burgas, Bulgaria			
2026-10-10		(Netherlands) Younes Smaili	Sportmani Events – ‘Don’t Call It A Comeback II’	Almere, Netherlands			
2026-07-18	Loss	(Bulgaria) Martin Petkov	EliteBet Max Fight Championship 66	Burgas, Bulgaria	Decision	3	3:00
2025-11-29	Win	(Argentina) Angel Bauza	Rajadamnern World Series	Bangkok, Thailand	Decision (Unanimous)	3	3:00
2025-07-19	Win	(Australia) Hugh O'Donnell	Rajadamnern World Series	Bangkok, Thailand	Decision (Split)	3	3:00
2024-11-09	Win	(Thailand) Talaytong Sor.Thanaphet	Rajadamnern World Series	Bangkok, Thailand	Decision	3	3:00
2024-10-10	Win	(Thailand) Yodpayak Sitsongpeenong	Rajadamnern Stadium	Bangkok, Thailand	Decision	3	3:00
2024-03-30	Loss	(Thailand) Yodwicha Por.Boonsit	Rajadamnern World Series Sanjorn	Nakhon Ratchasima province, Thailand	TKO (Elbow)	1	1:24
For the interim Rajadamnern Stadium Super Welterweight (154 lbs) title.
2023-11-11	Win	(France) Julian TFC Muay Thai	Rajadamnern World Series	Bangkok, Thailand	Decision (Unanimous)	3	3:00
2023-09-16	Loss	(Thailand) Satanfah Rachanon	Rajadamnern World Series	Bangkok, Thailand	Decision (Unanimous)	3	3:00
2023-08-05	Loss	(Thailand) Petchmorakot Petchyindee Academy	Rajadamnern World Series - Group Stage	Bangkok, Thailand	Decision (Unanimous)	3	3:00
2023-07-01	Loss	(Thailand) Shadow Singha Mawynn	Rajadamnern World Series - Group Stage	Bangkok, Thailand	Decision (Unanimous)	3	3:00
2023-05-27	Loss	(Thailand) Yodwicha Por.Boonsit	Rajadamnern World Series - Group Stage	Bangkok, Thailand	Decision (Unanimous)	5	3:00
Legend: Win Loss Draw/No contest Notes

== See also ==
- Rajadamnern Stadium
