= Petchmorakot Petchyindee Academy =

Thai professional Muay Thai fighter, kickboxer, and boxer (born 1994(

Petchmorakot Bangmadklongtan
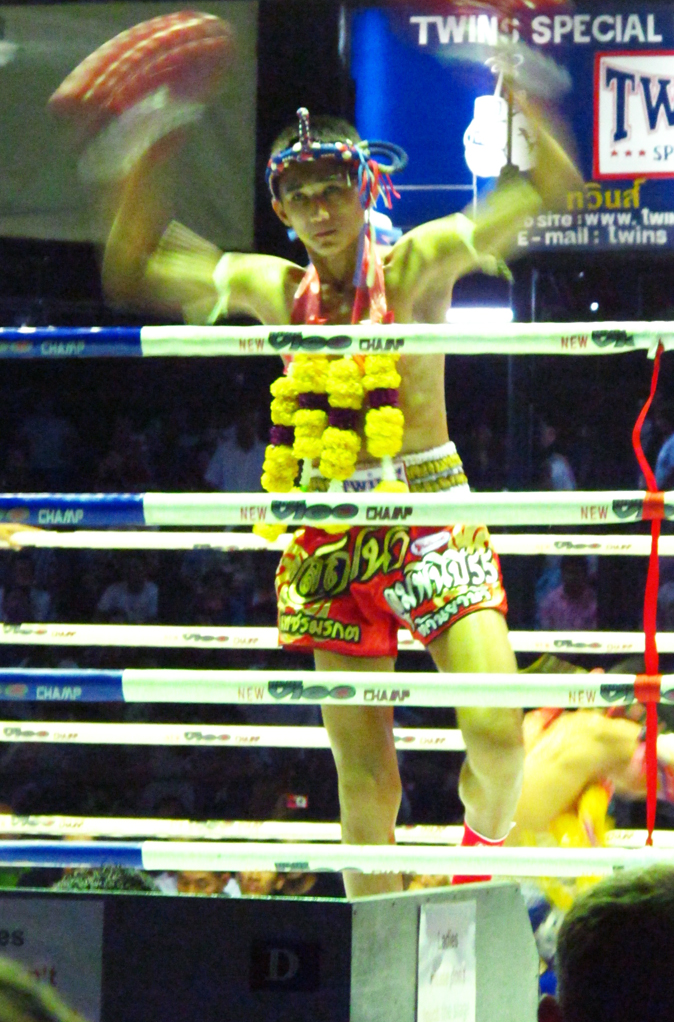
- Born: Nopadon Darouphan; February 14, 1994 (age 32); Ubon Ratchathani, Thailand
- Other names: Petchmorakot Wor.Sangprapai; Petchmorakot Petchyindee
- Height: 180 cm (5 ft 11 in)
- Division: Featherweight (155 lbs) (ONE); Middleweight; Super Welterweight; Welterweight; Super Lightweight
- Reach: 185 cm (73 in)
- Style: Muay Thai (Muay Khao)
- Stance: Southpaw
- Fighting out of: Bangkok, Thailand
- Team: Petchyindee Academy

Kickboxing record
- Total: 219
- Wins: 176
- Losses: 40
- Draws: 2
- No contests: 1

Other information
- Boxing record from BoxRec

Nopadon Darouphan (Thai: นพดล ดรุณพันธ์; born February 14, 1994), known professionally as Petchmorakot Bangmadklongtan and formerly known as Petchmorakot Petchyindee (Thai: เพชรมรกต เพชรยินดีอะคาเดมี), is a Thai professional Muay Thai fighter, kickboxer, and boxer. He is the current Rajadamnern Stadium Middleweight Champion and a former two-division Lumpinee Stadium champion. He is especially known for his slicing elbows and devastating knees.

Additionally, he competed for the Singapore-based organization ONE Championship in their all-striking ONE Super Series format, where he has fought in both Muay Thai and kickboxing. He was the former and inaugural ONE Muay Thai Featherweight World Champion before the disagreement between his gym and ONE Championship.

== Muay Thai career ==
On March 25, 2011, Phetmorakot defeated Wanchai Sor Kittisak to win the Lumpinee Stadium Mini Flyweight (105 lbs) title.

On April 9, 2013, he defeated Thong Puideenaidee at Lumpinee Stadium to win the Thailand (PAT) Super Bantamweight (122 lbs) title.

On December 3, 2013, Phetmorakot won his second Lumpinee title by defeating Auisiewpor Sujibamikiew to capture the vacant Lumpinee Stadium Super Featherweight (130 lbs) title. On February 28, 2014, he defeated Kwankhaw Mor Ratanabandit to retain the Lumpinee Stadium Super Featherweight title. He successfully defended his Lumpinee Stadium title a third time by defeating Genji Umeno via unanimous decision in Japan on April 19, 2015.

On October 9, 2014, he defeated the legendary Saenchai PKSaenchaimuaythaigym by decision after five rounds of battle at Rajadamnern Stadium.

On December 8, 2015, Phetmorakot defeated Petchboonchu FA Group at Lumpinee Stadium to win the Thailand (PAT) Super Lightweight (140 lbs) title, marking his second Thai national Muay Thai title victory.

On December 25, 2015, Phetmorakot defeated future Glory Featherweight Champion Petpanomrung Kiatmuu9 to win the Toyota Vigo Marathon 62 kg Tournament.

On July 29, 2016, Phetmorakot later entered the one-night Toyota Hilux Revo Superchamp Tournament that took place in Tokyo, Japan. In the Quarter Finals, he defeated Masashi Hirano by second-round TKO due to a cut. He then defeated Chamuaktong Fightermuaythai in Semi Finals by decision. In the Tournament Final, he defeated Silarit Chor Sampeenong by second-round KO to win the Toyota Hilux Revo Superchamp 63.5 kg Tournament.

On October 28, 2016, Phetmorakot defeated Azize Hlali by second-round KO at YOKKAO 21 in Hong Kong.

On April 28, 2018, Phetmorakot defeated Mohamed Souanane by TKO at Phoenix Fighting Championship 7 in Phuket to win the Phoenix Fight Championship 149 lb title.

On October 4, 2019 at the Hilux Revo Muay Thai Marathon in Chiang Rai, Phetmorakot defeated Ali Ebrahimi by second-round KO to win the WBC Muaythai Diamond Middleweight Championship. As a result, he became the fourth fighter to win a WBC Diamond Championship belt.

=== ONE Championship ===
On June 23, 2018, Phetmorakot Petchyindee Academy made his ONE Championship debut at ONE Championship: Pinnacle of Power, where he defeated Fabrice Fairtex Delannon by TKO in the second round.

Next, on October 6, 2018, he faced Alaverdi Ramazanov at ONE Championship: Kingdom of Heroes, where he lost by unanimous decision.

He would bounce back on December 7, 2018, at ONE Championship: Destiny of Champions, where he defeated Liam Harrison by second-round knockout.

On March 8, 2019, he defeated Kenta Yamada by unanimous decision at ONE Championship: Reign of Valor.

==== ONE Kickboxing Featherweight World Grand Prix ====
Phetmorakot was later selected as a competitor in the ONE Super Series Kickboxing Featherweight World Grand Prix, which included other fighters like Yodsanklai Fairtex and Giorgio Petrosyan. His opponent in the Quarter-Finals was Giorgio Petrosyan.

On May 17, 2019, Phetmorakot faced Giorgio Petrosyan in the Kickboxing Featherweight World Grand Prix Quarter-Finals at ONE Championship: Enter the Dragon, where he won a closely contested split decision. However, the result of the fight was overturned to a no-contest when reviews showed that Phetmorakot had used illegal clinching throughout the fight. A rematch was scheduled for July 12, 2019 at ONE Championship: Masters of Destiny, where Phetmorakot lost by unanimous decision and was eliminated from the Kickboxing Featherweight World Grand Prix.

==== Post-Grand Prix ====
On November 22, 2019, Phetmorakot defeated Charlie Peters by second-round KO at ONE Championship: Edge Of Greatness.

==== ONE Featherweight Muay Thai World Champion ====
Phetmorakot is scheduled to face Jamal Yusupov for the inaugural ONE Featherweight Muay Thai World Championship at ONE Championship: Warrior's Code on February 7, 2020. However, Yusupov was later forced to withdraw from the match and Phetmorakot will now face fellow Thai fighter Detrit Sathian Muay Thai for the ONE Featherweight Muay Thai Title. Detrit was later pulled from the bout and was replaced by Pongsiri P.K.Saenchaimuaythaigym, who took the fight on just two days' notice. Phetmorakot would defeat Pongsiri by unanimous decision to become the first ONE Featherweight Muay Thai World Champion.

Phetmorakot made a defense of the ONE Featherweight Muay Thai World Championship for the first time against Muay Thai legend Yodsanklai Fairtex at ONE Championship: No Surrender on July 31, 2020. He successfully retained the title with a split decision victory over Yodsanklai.

Phetmorakot was scheduled to make his second defense of the ONE Featherweight Muay Thai World Championship against Magnus Andersson at ONE Championship: A New Breed 3 on September 18, 2020. Phetmorakot won the fight via third-round knockout.

Phetmorakot was scheduled to make his third title defense against Jamal Yusupov at ONE: Full Circle on February 25, 2022. The bout was later cancelled, and Phetmorakot was re-booked to face Jimmy Vienot at ONE 157 on May 20, 2022. Petchmorakot won the fight by split decision.

Phetmorakot made his fourth ONE Featherweight Muay Thai title defense against Tawanchai P.K. Saenchaimuaythaigym at ONE 161 on September 29, 2022. He lost the fight and title by unanimous decision.

=== Post-ONE Championship ===
Due to a disagreement between his gym, Petchyindee Academy, and ONE Championship, all Petchyindee fighters were released from the promotion at the request of the gym.

After Post-ONE FC Petchmorokat went 5-1 in Rajadamnern World Series, fought Kaito twice in Shootboxing winning the first and losing the rematch for the world title.

Petchmorokat fought twice in K-1 Rules against Han Feilong and Masoud Minaei losing both by decision.

Petchmorokat won the Rajadamnern Stadium Middleweight (160 lbs) title against Joe Ryan and defended it against Josh Hill, Nayanesh Ayman, Kongjak Por.Paoin.

== Titles and accomplishments ==
- Rajadamnern Stadium
  - 2024 Rajadamnern Stadium Middleweight (160 lbs) Champion
    - Four successful title defenses
- ONE Championship
  - 2020 ONE Featherweight Muay Thai World Champion (inaugural)
    - Three successful title defenses
  - Performance of the Night (One time) vs. Jimmy Vienot
- WBC Muay Thai
  - 2019 WBC Muay Thai Diamond Middleweight Champion
- Phoenix Fighting Championship
  - 2018 Phoenix Fight Championship 149 lbs/68 kg World Champion
- Toyota Hilux Revo Superchamp
  - 2016 Toyota Hilux Revo Superchamp 63.5 kg Tournament Champion
- Professional Boxing Association of Thailand (PAT)
  - 2015 Thailand Super Lightweight (140 lbs) Champion
  - 2013 Thailand Super Bantamweight (122 lbs) Champion
- Lumpinee Stadium
  - 2013 Lumpinee Stadium Super Featherweight (130 lbs) Champion (2 defenses)
  - 2011 Lumpinee Stadium Mini Flyweight (105 lbs) Champion

== Professional boxing record ==
5 fights	5 wins	0 losses
By knockout	3	0
By decision	2	0

No.	Result	Record	Opponent	Type	Round, time	Date	Location	Notes
5	Win	5–0	(Thailand) Mongkonchai Namlak1	TKO	3 (6), 1:39	8 Mar 2022	Rangsit International Stadium, Rangsit, Thailand	
4	Win	4–0	(Thailand) Yiamyut Lookmakrodyon111	TKO	3 (6), 0:15	14 Dec 2021	Saphan Hin, Phuket, Thailand	
3	Win	3–0	(Thailand) Saenkai Lookmakrodyon111	TKO	4 (6), 1:49	5 Oct 2021	Chang Arena, Buriram, Thailand	
2	Win	2–0	(Germany) Elias Hannes Kopp	UD	6 (6), 3:00	6 Mar 2021	Rangsit International Stadium, Rangsit, Thailand	
1	Win	1–0	(Thailand) Thoedsak Singmanasak	UD	6 (6), 3:00	30 Oct 2020	Rangsit International Stadium, Rangsit, Thailand	

== Muay Thai and Kickboxing record ==
Professional Muay Thai and Kickboxing record
176 Wins, 40 Losses, 2 Draws, 1 No Contest
Date	Result	Opponent	Event	Location	Method	Round	Time
2026-09-26	Loss	(Switzerland) Dani Rodriguez	Switzerland Mega Muay Thai - Road to RWS	Bern, Switzerland	KO (straight to the body)	1	2:12
Lost the Rajadamnern Stadium Middleweight (160 lbs) title.
2026-04-25	Win	(Russia) Salimkhan Ibragimov	Rajadamnern World Series	Bangkok, Thailand	TKO (Doctor stoppage)	4	1:04
Defended the Rajadamnern Stadium Middleweight (160 lbs) title.
2025-12-27	Loss	(Switzerland) Daniel Rodriguez	Rajadamnern World Series, Rajadamnern Stadium 80th Anniversary	Bangkok, Thailand	Decision (Unanimous)	5	3:00
For the Rajadamnern Stadium Super Welterweight (154 lbs) title.
2025-10-11	Win	(Brazil) Anderson Santiago	Rajadamnern World Series	Bangkok, Thailand	TKO (Doctor stoppage)	2	
2025-07-19	Win	(Thailand) Kongjak Por.Paoin	Rajadamnern World Series	Bangkok, Thailand	Decision (Unanimous)	5	3:00
Defends the Rajadamnern Stadium Middleweight (160 lbs) title.
2025-04-12	Win	(Spain) Nayanesh Ayman	Rajadamnern World Series	Bangkok, Thailand	Decision (Unanimous)	5	3:00
Defends the Rajadamnern Stadium Middleweight (160 lbs) title.
2025-02-01	Win	(England) Josh Hill	Rajadamnern World Series	Bangkok, Thailand	Decision (Unanimous)	5	3:00
Defends the Rajadamnern Stadium Middleweight (160 lbs) title.
2024-12-21	Loss	(China) Han Feilong	Wu Lin Feng 551	Tangshan, China	Decision (Unanimous)	3	3:00
2024-11-16	Win	(England) Joe Ryan	Rajadamnern World Series	Bangkok, Thailand	Decision (Unanimous)	5	3:00
Wins the Rajadamnern Stadium Middleweight (160 lbs) title.
2024-09-28	Loss	(Iran) Masoud Minaei	Kunlun Fight 102- Qualifying Tournament, Seminfinal	Sanya, China	Decision (Majority)	3	3:00
2024-04-13	Loss	(Japan) Kaito	Shoot Boxing 2024 act.2	Tokyo, Japan	Decision (Majority)	5	3:00
For the SHOOT BOXING World Super Welterweight championship.
2024-02-10	Win	(Japan) Kaito	Shoot Boxing 2024 act.1	Tokyo, Japan	Ext.R Decision (Majority)	4	3:00
2023-09-09	Loss	(Thailand) Thananchai Sitsongpeenong	Rajadamnern World Series - Final 4	Bangkok, Thailand	Decision (Split)	3	3:00
2023-08-05	Win	(Turkey) Burak Poyraz	Rajadamnern World Series - Group Stage	Bangkok, Thailand	Decision (Unanimous)	3	3:00
2023-07-01	Win	(Thailand) Yodwicha Por Boonsit	Rajadamnern World Series - Group Stage	Bangkok, Thailand	Decision (Unanimous)	3	3:00
2023-05-27	Win	(Thailand) Shadow Singmawynn	Rajadamnern World Series - Group Stage	Bangkok, Thailand	Decision (Unanimous)	3	3:00
2023-03-11	Win	(Morocco) Oussama Elkoche	RWS + Petchyindee, Rajadamnern Stadium	Bangkok, Thailand	KO (Flying knee)	2	2:01
2022-12-09	Win	(Iran) Reza Ahmadnezhad	Rajadamnern World Series, Rajadamnern Stadium	Bangkok, Thailand	Decision (Unanimous)	3	3:00
2022-09-29	Loss	(Thailand) Tawanchai P.K. Saenchaimuaythaigym	ONE 161	Kallang, Singapore	Decision (Unanimous)	5	3:00
Lost the ONE Featherweight Muay Thai World Championship
2022-05-20	Win	(France) Jimmy Vienot	ONE 157	Kallang, Singapore	Decision (Split)	5	3:00
Defended the ONE Featherweight Muay Thai World Championship
2021-04-02	Win	(Thailand) Thananchai Rachanon	Muaymanwansuk, Rangsit Stadium	Rangsit, Thailand	Decision	5	3:00
2020-09-18	Win	(Sweden) Magnus Andersson	ONE Championship: A New Breed 3	Bangkok, Thailand	TKO (Referee stoppage)	3	2:57
Defended the ONE Featherweight Muay Thai World Championship
2020-07-31	Win	(Thailand) Yodsanklai Fairtex	ONE Championship: No Surrender	Bangkok, Thailand	Decision (Majority)	5	3:00
Defended the ONE Featherweight Muay Thai World Championship
2020-02-07	Win	(Thailand) Pongsiri P.K.Saenchaimuaythaigym	ONE Championship: Warrior’s Code	Jakarta, Indonesia	Decision (Unanimous)	5	3:00
Wins the inaugural ONE Featherweight Muay Thai World Championship
2019-11-22	Win	(England) Charlie Peters	ONE Championship: Edge Of Greatness	Kallang, Singapore	KO (Knee to Body)	2	1:48
2019-10-04	Win	(Iran) Mohammad Siasarani	Hilux Revo Muay Thai Marathon	Chiang Rai, Thailand	KO (Knee to Body)	2	
Wins WBC Muay Thai Diamond Middleweight title
2019-07-12	Loss	(Italy) Giorgio Petrosyan	ONE Championship: Masters Of Destiny	Kuala Lumpur, Malaysia	Decision (Unanimous)	3	3:00
ONE Kickboxing Featherweight Grand Prix Quarter-Finals
2019-05-17	NC	(Italy) Giorgio Petrosyan	ONE Championship: Enter the Dragon	Kallang, Singapore	NC (Illegal clinching)	3	3:00
ONE Kickboxing Featherweight Grand Prix Quarter-Finals. Initially a decision win for Petchmorakot, later overturned due to excessive clinching.
2019-03-08	Win	(Japan) Kenta	ONE Championship: Reign of Valor	Yangon, Myanmar	Decision (Unanimous)	3	3:00
2018-12-07	Win	(England) Liam Harrison	ONE Championship: Destiny of Champions	Kuala Lumpur, Malaysia	KO (Left Elbow)	2	1:15
2018-10-06	Loss	(Russia) Alaverdi Ramazanov	ONE Championship: Kingdom of Heroes	Bangkok, Thailand	Decision (Unanimous)	3	3:00
2018-06-23	Win	(French Guiana) Fabrice Delannon	ONE Championship: Pinnacle of Power	Beijing, China	TKO (Doctor Stoppage/Cut by Elbow)	2	0:45
2018-04-28	Win	(France) Mohamed Souane	Phoenix Fighting Championship 7	Phuket, Thailand	TKO (Doctor Stoppage/Elbow)	2	
Won Phoenix Fight Championship 149lbs/68kg World Title.
2018-03-08	Win	(Thailand) Manasak Sor.Jor.Lekmuangnon	Rajadamnern Stadium	Bangkok, Thailand	Decision	5	3:00
2018-02-10	Win	(Germany) Fabian Hundt	Top King World Series - TK17	China	Decision (Unanimous)	3	3:00
2017-11-09	Win	(Thailand) Manasak Sor.Jor.Lekmuangnon	Rajadamnern Stadium	Bangkok, Thailand	Decision	5	3:00
2017-09-05	Win	(Thailand) Chujaroen Dabransarakarm	Lumpinee Stadium	Bangkok, Thailand	Decision	5	3:00
2017-04-06	Win	(Thailand) Yodpanomrung Jitmuangnon	Rajadamnern Stadium	Bangkok, Thailand	Decision	5	3:00
2016-12-09	Loss	(Thailand) Manasak Sor.Jor.Lekmuangnon	Lumpinee Stadium	Bangkok, Thailand	Decision	5	3:00
2016-10-28	Win	(France) Azize Hlali	Yokkao 21	Hong Kong, China	KO	2	
2016-10-06	Loss	(Thailand) Manasak Sor.Jor.Lekmuangnon	Rajadamnern Stadium	Bangkok, Thailand	Decision	5	3:00
2016-09-05	Win	(Thailand) Yodpanomrung Jitmuangnon	Rajadamnern Stadium	Bangkok, Thailand	Decision	5	3:00
2016-07-29	Win	(Thailand) Silarit Chor Sampeenong	Toyota Hilux Revo Superchamp Tournament, Final	Tokyo, Japan	KO (Left Body Cross)	2	3:00
Won Toyota Hilux Revo Superchamp 63,5 kg Tournament.
2016-07-29	Win	(Thailand) Chamuaktong Fightermuaythai	Toyota Hilux Revo Superchamp Tournament, Semi Finals	Tokyo, Japan	Decision	3	3:00
2016-07-29	Win	(Japan) Masahi Hirano	Toyota Hilux Revo Superchamp Tournament, Quarter Finals	Tokyo, Japan	TKO (Cut Stoppage)	2	3:00
2016-05-09	Loss	(Thailand) Petpanomrung Kiatmuu9	Rajadamnern Stadium	Bangkok, Thailand	Decision	5	3:00
Fight Was For WMC 135lbs. title.
2016-04-07	Win	(Thailand) Yodpanomrung Jitmuangnon	Rajadamnern Stadium	Bangkok, Thailand	Decision	5	3:00
2016-03-07	Loss	(Thailand) Petpanomrung Kiatmuu9	Rajadamnern Stadium	Bangkok, Thailand	Decision	5	3:00
2016-02-20	Win	(Thailand) Design Rajanont	Lumpinee Stadium	Bangkok, Thailand	Decision	5	3:00
2015-12-25	Win	(Thailand) Petpanomrung Kiatmuu9	Toyota Vigo Marathon Tournament Finals 2015, Final	Chon Buri, Thailand	Decision	3	3:00
Won Toyota Vigo Marathon Tournament title 62kg.
2015-12-25	Win	(Thailand) Aranchai Kiatphataraphan	Toyota Vigo Marathon Tournament Finals 2015, Semi Final	Chon Buri, Thailand	Decision	3	3:00
2015-12-08	Win	(Thailand) Petchboonchu FA Group	Lumpinee Stadium	Bangkok, Thailand	Decision	5	3:00
Won Thailand Super-Lightweight title.
2015-11-10	Win	(Thailand) Chujaroen Dabransarakarm	Lumpinee Stadium	Bangkok, Thailand	Decision	5	3:00
2015-09-25	Win	(France) Brian Denis	Toyota Vigo Marathon Tournament 2015, Final	Nakhon Sawan, Thailand	Decision	3	3:00
Won Toyota Vigo Marathon Tournament qualification 62kg.
2015-09-25	Win	(Thailand) Kringkai Tor Silachai	Toyota Vigo Marathon Tournament 2015, Semi Final	Nakhon Sawan, Thailand	Decision	3	3:00
2015-09-25	Win	(Thailand) Manowan Sitongpetchyinde	Toyota Vigo Marathon Tournament 2015, Quarter Final	Nakhon Sawan, Thailand	Decision	3	3:00
2015-08-07	Win	(Thailand) Chujaroen Dabransarakarm	Lumpinee Stadium	Bangkok, Thailand	Decision	5	3:00
2015-06-11	Loss	(Thailand) Kwankhao Mor.Ratanabandit	Rajadamnern Stadium	Bangkok, Thailand	Decision	5	3:00
2015-04-19	Win	(Japan) Genji Umeno	REBELS	Japan	Decision(Unanimous)	5	3:00
Defends the Lumpinee Stadium Super Featherweight (130 lbs) title.
2015-03-06	Win	(Thailand) Kwankhao Mor.Ratanabandit	Lumpinee Stadium	Bangkok, Thailand	Decision	5	3:00
2015-02-05	Loss	(Thailand) Kwankhao Mor.Ratanabandit	Rajadamnern Stadium	Bangkok, Thailand	Decision	5	3:00
For the Rajadamnern Stadium Super Featherweight (130 lbs) title.
2014-11-25	Win	(Thailand) Saeksan Or. Kwanmuang	Lumpinee Stadium	Bangkok, Thailand	Decision	5	3:00
2014-10-31	Win	(Scotland) Stewart Pringle	Toyota Tournament show	Bangkok, Thailand	KO (knees)	3	
2014-10-09	Win	(Thailand) Saenchai PKSaenchaimuaythaigym	Rajadamnern Stadium	Bangkok, Thailand	Decision	5	3:00
2014-08-13	Loss	(Thailand) Saeksan Or. Kwanmuang	Rajadamnern Stadium	Bangkok, Thailand	Decision	5	3:00
2014-07-08	Loss	(Thailand) Kongsak Sitboonmee	Lumpinee Stadium	Bangkok, Thailand	Decision	5	3:00
2014-06-11	Win	(Thailand) Petpanomrung Kiatmuu9	Rajadamnern Stadium	Bangkok, Thailand	Decision	5	3:00
2014-05-08	Draw	(Thailand) Kongsak Sitboonmee	Rajadamnern Stadium	Bangkok, Thailand	Decision	5	3:00
2014-04-04	Win	(Thailand) Petpanomrung Kiatmuu9	Southern Thailand	Bangkok, Thailand	Decision	5	3:00
2014-02-28	Win	(Thailand) Kwankhao Mor.Ratanabandit	Lumpinee Stadium	Bangkok, Thailand	Decision	5	3:00
Defends the Lumpinee Stadium Super Featherweight (130 lbs) title.
2014-02-07	Loss	(Thailand) Singtongnoi Por.Telakun	Lumpinee Stadium	Bangkok, Thailand	Decision	5	3:00
2014-01-03	Loss	(Thailand) Kaimukkao Por.Thairongruangkamai	Lumpinee Stadium	Bangkok, Thailand	Decision	5	3:00
2013-12-03	Win	(Thailand) Auisiewpor Sujibamikiew	Lumpinee Stadium	Bangkok, Thailand	Decision	5	3:00
Won the vacant Lumpinee Stadium Super Featherweight (130 lbs) title.
2013-10-29	Win	(Thailand) Phet Utong Or. Kwanmuang	Lumpinee Stadium	Bangkok, Thailand	Decision	5	3:00
2013-09-04	Loss	(Thailand) Petpanomrung Kiatmuu9	Rajadamnern Stadium	Bangkok, Thailand	Decision	5	3:00
2013-08-08	Win	(Thailand) Palangtip Nor Sripuang	Rajadamnern Stadium	Bangkok, Thailand	TKO (ref stoppage)	4	
2013-07-12	Win	(Thailand) Yokwithaya Petsimean	Lumpinee Stadium	Bangkok, Thailand	Decision	5	3:00
2013-06-07	Win	(Thailand) Pokaew Fonjangchonburi	Lumpinee Stadium	Bangkok, Thailand	TKO (knees)	3	
2013-05-03	Win	(Thailand) Khunsueklek Or Kwanmuang	Lumpinee Stadium	Bangkok, Thailand	KO (Elbow)	3	
2013-04-09	Win	(Thailand) Thong Puideenaidee	Lumpinee Stadium	Bangkok, Thailand	Decision	5	3:00
Won the Thailand (PAT) Super Bantamweight (122 lbs) title.
2013-03-07	Loss	(Thailand) Phet Utong Or. Kwanmuang	Rajadamnern Stadium	Bangkok, Thailand	Decision	5	3:00
2013-02-07	Win	(Thailand) Thong Puideenaidee	Rajadamnern Stadium	Bangkok, Thailand	Decision	5	3:00
2013-01-03	Win	(Thailand) Tingtong Chor Koiyuhaisuzu	Rajadamnern Stadium	Bangkok, Thailand	Decision	5	3:00
2012-09-11	Win	(Thailand) Saksuriya Kaiyanghadaogym	Lumpinee Stadium	Bangkok, Thailand	Decision	5	3:00
2012-08-17	Win	(Thailand) Ekmongkol Kaiyanghadaogym	Lumpinee Stadium	Bangkok, Thailand	Decision	5	3:00
2012-07-12	Win	(Thailand) Yokwithaya Petseemuann	Lumpinee Stadium	Bangkok, Thailand	Decision	5	3:00
2012-07-10	Loss	(Thailand) Manasak Narupai	Lumpinee Stadium	Bangkok, Thailand	TKO (kicks and punches)	3	
2012-03-30	Win	(Thailand) Mongkolchai Kwaitonggym	Lumpinee Stadium	Bangkok, Thailand	Decision	5	3:00
2012-02-24	Loss	(Thailand) Panomrunglek Kiatmuu9	Lumpinee Stadium	Bangkok, Thailand	Decision	5	3:00
2011-12-09	Loss	(Thailand) Mongkolchai Kwaitonggym	Lumpinee Stadium	Bangkok, Thailand	Decision	5	3:00
2011-11-09	Win	(Thailand) Panomrunglek Kiatmuu9	Rajadamnern Stadium	Bangkok, Thailand	Decision	5	3:00
2011-09-13	Win	(Thailand) Choknamchai Sitjagung	Lumpinee Stadium	Bangkok, Thailand	Decision	5	3:00
2011-07-29	Win	(Thailand) Mondam Sor.Weerapon	Lumpinee Stadium	Bangkok, Thailand	Decision	5	3:00
2011-05-10	Win	(Thailand) Wanheng Menayothin	Lumpinee Stadium	Bangkok, Thailand	Decision	5	3:00
2011-03-25	Win	(Thailand) Wanchai Sor Kittisak	Lumpinee Stadium	Bangkok, Thailand	Decision	5	3:00
Won the Lumpinee Stadium Mini Flyweight (105 lbs) title.
2011-02-04	Loss	(Thailand) Mondam Sor.Weerapon	Lumpinee Stadium	Bangkok, Thailand	Decision	5	3:00
2010-12-31	Win	(Thailand) Nongbonlek Kaiyanghadaogym	Lumpinee Stadium	Bangkok, Thailand	TKO	2	
2010-09-10	Win	(Thailand) Petchdam Petchtaekhian	Lumpinee Stadium	Bangkok, Thailand	Decision	5	3:00
2010-06-11	Loss	(Thailand) Wanphichit Minayothin	Por.Pramuk, Lumpinee Stadium	Bangkok, Thailand	KO	4	
Legend: Win Loss Draw/No contest Notes
