= Shadow Singha Mawynn =

Thai Muay Thai kickboxer

Shadow
- Born: Veerapat Preecha; February 11, 2000 (age 26); Mueang Tak district, Tak province, Thailand
- Other names: Shadow Thor.Thepsutin (ชาโด้ ท.เทพสุทิน); Shadow Suanaharnpeekmai (ชาโด้ สวนอาหารปีกไม้); Shadow Singha Mawynn
- Height: 1.80 m (5 ft 11 in)
- Weight: 67 kg (148 lb; 10.6 st)
- Reach: 73.2 in (186 cm)
- Style: Muay Thai
- Stance: Orthodox
- Fighting out of: Bangkok, Thailand

Kickboxing record
- Total: 109
- Wins: 82
- Losses: 25
- Draws: 1
- No contests: 1

Shadow Singmawynn (Thai: ชาโด้ สิงห์มาวิน), is a Thai Muay Thai kickboxer. He currently competes in the Featherweight division of ONE Championship. He also competed in Rajadamnern Stadium where he was the former Rajadamnern Stadium Welterweight Champion. As of September 22, 2026, he is ranked #2 in the ONE Featherweight Muay Thai rankings.

== Background and career ==
Shadow was born in the Tak province where was raised by a single mother. He started training in Muay Thai at the age of 12, he quickly started to compete as a way to help his family financially. He was brought to Bangkok to compete for the first time by the owner of the Wan Cherd camp. Shadow later joined the Suan Paeng Mai camp.

On November 24, 2019, Shadow defeated Darky Sawansangmanja by TKO with low kicks at the Channel 7 Stadium for the Kiatpetch promotion.

On September 20, 2020, Shadow defeated Inseethong Por.Pinnapat by doctor stoppage in the fourth round.

On December 8, 2020, Shadow faced Kulabdam Sor.Jor.Piek-U-Thai at the Lumpinee Stadium Birthday show. He lost the fight by knockout in the second round.

During the covid crisis Shadow went away from the rings for year and considered retirement but made the choice to go back to competition this time fighting out of a different gym called Singmawynn.

On February 21, 2022, Shadow faced Julio Lobo for the vacant Rajadamnern Stadium Welterweight title. He won the fight by decision.

On July 22, 2022, Shadow engaged in the Rajadamnern World Series, facing Jonathan Betts in the first round of the group stage. On December 16, Shadow reached the final where competed for the title and the one million baht cash prize against Sibmuen Sitchefboontham. Shadow won the fight by unanimous decision.

== Titles and accomplishments ==
- Rajadamnern Stadium
  - 2022 Rajadamnern Stadium Welterweight (147 lbs) Champion
  - 2022 Rajadamnern World Series Welterweight (147 lbs) Winner

== Fight record ==
Muay Thai record
83 Wins, 25 Losses, 1 Draw, 1 No Contest
Date	Result	Opponent	Event	Location	Method	Round	Time
2026-02-13	Loss	(Scotland) Nico Carrillo	ONE Fight Night 40	Bangkok, Thailand	Decision (Unanimous)	5	3:00
For the interim ONE Featherweight Muay Thai World Championship.
2025-09-26	Loss	(China) Liu Mengyang	ONE Friday Fights 126, Lumpinee Stadium	Bangkok, Thailand	Decision (Unanimous)	3	3:00
2025-09-05	Win	(France) Bampara Kouyaté	ONE Fight Night 35	Bangkok, Thailand	KO (Spinning back fist)	2	1:20
2025-07-12	NC	(Algeria) Mohamed Younes Rabah	ONE Fight Night 33	Bangkok, Thailand	NC (accidental eye poke)	2	0:12
Catchweight (156 lb) bout; Rabah missed weight. Accidental eye poke rendered Rabah unable to continue.
2025-03-14	Win	(Iran) Hassan Vahdanirad	ONE Friday Fights 100, Lumpinee Stadium	Bangkok, Thailand	KO (Elbow)	2	2:51
2024-12-07	Win	(Thailand) Sitthichai Sitsongpeenong	ONE Friday Fights 92, Lumpinee Stadium	Bangkok, Thailand	Decision (Unanimous)	3	3:00
2024-09-27	Win	(Iran) Mohammad Siasarani	ONE Friday Fights 81, Lumpinee Stadium	Bangkok, Thailand	Decision (Unanimous)	3	3:00
2024-06-28	Win	(France) Jimmy Vienot	ONE Friday Fights 68, Lumpinee Stadium	Bangkok, Thailand	Decision (Unanimous)	3	3:00
2024-04-05	Win	(Sweden) Erik Hehir	ONE Friday Fights 58, Lumpinee Stadium	Bangkok, Thailand	TKO (High kick)	3	0:53
2024-02-16	Loss	(Russia) Mamuka Usubyan	ONE Friday Fights 52, Lumpinee Stadium	Bangkok, Thailand	Decision (Unanimous)	3	3:00
2023-12-23	Win	(Thailand) Satanfah Rachanon	Rajadamnern World Series	Bangkok, Thailand	Decision (Unanimous)	3	3:00
2023-10-21	Win	(Iran) Shahoo Ghesarian	Rajadamnern World Series	Bangkok, Thailand	TKO (Punches)	3	
2023-09-09	Win	(Uzbekistan) Shokhruz VenumMuayThai	Rajadamnern World Series	Bangkok, Thailand	TKO	2	
2023-08-05	Loss	(Thailand) Yodwicha Por Boonsit	Rajadamnern World Series - Group Stage	Bangkok, Thailand	Decision (Unanimous)	3	3:00
2023-07-01	Win	(Turkey) Burak Poyraz	Rajadamnern World Series - Group Stage	Bangkok, Thailand	Decision (Unanimous)	3	3:00
2023-05-27	Loss	(Thailand) Petchmorakot Petchyindee Academy	Rajadamnern World Series - Group Stage	Bangkok, Thailand	Decision (Unanimous)	3	3:00
2023-03-04	Win	(Iran) Reza VenumMuayThai	Rajadamnern World Series	Bangkok, Thailand	Decision (Unanimous)	3	3:00
2022-12-16	Win	(Thailand) Sibmuen Sitchefboontham	Rajadamnern World Series - Final	Bangkok, Thailand	Decision (Unanimous)	5	3:00
Wins the 2022 Rajadamnern World Series Welterweight title.
2022-11-04	Win	(Thailand) Yodkhunpon Sitmonchai	Rajadamnern World Series - Semi Final	Bangkok, Thailand	Decision (Unanimous)	3	3:00
2022-09-30	Draw	(Iran) Sajad Sattari	Rajadamnern World Series - Group Stage	Bangkok, Thailand	Decision (Majority)	3	3:00
2022-08-26	Win	(Thailand) Mungkornkaw Sitkaewprapon	Rajadamnern World Series - Group Stage	Bangkok, Thailand	TKO (Doctor stoppage)	3	
2022-07-22	Win	(England) Jonny Betts	Rajadamnern World Series - Group Stage	Bangkok, Thailand	Decision (Unanimous)	3	3:00
2022-03-21	Win	(Brazil) Julio Lobo	Singmawin, Rajadamnern Stadium	Bangkok, Thailand	Decision	5	3:00
Wins the vacant Rajadamnern Stadium 147 lbs title.
2020-12-08	Loss	(Thailand) Kulabdam Sor.Jor.Piek-U-Thai	Lumpinee Birthday Show, Lumpinee Stadium	Bangkok, Thailand	KO (left hook)	2	
2020-09-20	Win	(Thailand) Inseethong Por.Pinnapat	Kiatpetch, Channel 7 Stadium	Bangkok, Thailand	TKO (Doctor stoppage)	4	
2020-07-12	Win	(Brazil) Julio Lobo	Chang Muay Thai Kiatpetch, Or.Tor.Gor 3 Stadium	Nonthaburi Province, Thailand	Decision	5	3:00
2020-03-06	Draw	(Brazil) Julio Lobo	Kiatpetch, Lumpinee Stadium	Bangkok, Thailand	Decision	5	3:00
2020-02-09	Loss	(Brazil) Julio Lobo	Srithammaracha + Kiatpetch Super Fight	Nakhon Si Thammarat, Thailand	Decision	5	3:00
2019-11-24	Win	(Thailand) Darky Sawansangmanja	Kiatpetch, Channel 7 Stadium	Bangkok, Thailand	TKO (Low kicks)	2	
2019-09-13	Loss	(Thailand) Ferrari Jakrayanmuaythai	Samui Festival + Kiatpetch	Ko Samui, Thailand	Decision	5	3:00
2019-06-26	Loss	(Thailand) Kulabdam Sor.Jor.Piek-U-Thai	RuamponkonSamui + Kiatpetch Super Fight	Surat Thani, Thailand	Decision	5	3:00
2019-05-10	Win	(Thailand) Ferrari Jakrayanmuaythai	Kiatpetch, Lumpinee Stadium	Bangkok, Thailand	Decision	5	3:00
2019-03-23	Win	(Thailand) Mahadej Or.Atchariya	Muay Thai Lumpinee SuperFight, Lumpinee Stadium	Bangkok, Thailand	KO (Right cross)	4	
2019-02-16	Win	(Thailand) Kaiyasit Kiatcharoenchai	Muay Thai Lumpinee SuperFight, Lumpinee Stadium	Bangkok, Thailand	Decision	5	3:00
2019-01-19	Win	(Thailand) Jomhod Chor Ketweena	Muay Thai Lumpinee SuperFight, Lumpinee Stadium	Bangkok, Thailand	Decision	5	3:00
2018-10-21	Loss	(Thailand) Bin Parunchai	Kiatpetch, Channel 7 Stadium	Bangkok, Thailand	KO (Elbow)	2	
2018-09-15	Win	(Thailand) Detsaknoi Sor.SamarnGarden		Thailand	Decision	5	3:00
2018-06-30	Win	(Thailand) Revo Nakbinalaiyont	Kiatpetch, Lumpinee Stadium	Bangkok, Thailand	KO (Elbow)	2	
Legend: Win Loss Draw/No contest Notes
