= Dani Rodriguez (fighter) =

Swiss Muay Thai fighter

- Born: Daniel Franklin Rodriguez Roque; June 30, 1998 (age 28); Zürich, Switzerland
- Other names: Daniel SinbiMuayThai (แดเนียล ซิมบีมวยไทย); Daniel Sitchefboontham (แดเนียล ศิษย์เชฟบุญธรรม); Daniel Aoodonmuang (ดาเนียล อู๊ดดอนเมือง)
- Height: 185 cm (6 ft 1 in)
- Division: Super Welterweight
- Reach: 193 cm (76 in)
- Style: Muay Thai
- Stance: Southpaw
- Fighting out of: Zürich, Switzerland; Phuket, Thailand
- Team: Dado Gym (Switzerland); Sinbi Muay Thai / Superbon Training Camp (Thailand)
- Trainer: Leonardo Irmici

Kickboxing record
- Total: 52
- Wins: 51
- By knockout: 24
- Losses: 1
- Draws: 0

Daniel Franklin "Dani" Rodriguez Roque (born June 30, 1998) is a Swiss professional Muay Thai fighter. He is the current Rajadamnern Stadium Super Welterweight Champion.

== Muay Thai career ==
Rodriguez started Muay Thai at the age of 14 invited by a friend, he then joined Dado Gym in Zürich, Switzerland. In 2019 Rodriguez traveled to Thailand for the first time to train at the Sitchefboontham camp. During this trip he fought three times, winning all his bouts by knockout at the Rajadamnern Stadium.

On August 21, 2021, Rodriguez faced Valentin Thibaut for WBC Muay Thai European title at the event Fight Time in Switzerland. He won the fight by decision to capture the belt.

On June 1, 2022, Rodriguez faced Saenpon Petchphachara for the vacant Rajadamnern Stadium 154 lbs title. He won the fight by decision and became the 13th non-Thai fighter in history to hold a Rajadamnern Stadium belt.

On September 9, 2022, Rodriguez faced top fighter Yodwicha Por Boonsit in the second round of the Rajadamnern World Series. He created the upset when he won the fight by split decision. Following this success, Rodriguez was ranked as the #1 Muay Thai fighter in the world at 154 lbs by both the World Muaythai Organization and the WBC Muay Thai.

== Personal life ==
Born in Switzerland, Rodriguez is of Dominican descent.

== Titles and accomplishments ==
- Rajadamnern Stadium
  - 2022 Rajadamnern Stadium Super Welterweight (154 lbs) Champion
    - Five successful title defenses
  - 2022 Rajadamnern World Series 154 lbs Tournament Winner
  - 2022 Rajadamnern World Series Best Fighter
  - 2024 Rajadamnern World Series 154 lbs Tournament Winner
  - 2026 Rajadamnern Stadium Middleweight (160 lbs) Champion
- World Boxing Council Muay Thai
  - 2016 WBC Muay Thai Swiss -63.5 kg Champion
  - 2021 WBC Muay Thai European 154 lbs Champion

Awards

- 2024 WMO Fighter of the Year
- 2025 Sports Authority of Thailand Foreign Fighter of the Year

== Fight record ==
Professional Muay Thai Record
51 Wins (24 (T)KOs), 1 Loss, 0 Draw
Date	Result	Opponent	Event	Location	Method	Round	Time
2026-09-26	Win	(Thailand) Petchmorakot Petchyindee Academy	Switzerland Mega Muay Thai - Road to RWS	Bern, Switzerland	KO (straight to the body)	1	2:12
Won the Rajadamnern Stadium Middleweight (160 lbs) title.
2026-06-27	Win	(Argentina) Angel Bauza	Rajadamnern World Series 200	Bangkok, Thailand	KO (high kick)	3	0:24
Defended the Rajadamnern Stadium Super Welterweight (154 lbs) title.
2026-04-18	Win	(Thailand) Hercules WanKongOhm.WKO	Rajadamnern World Series, Rajadamnern Stadium	Bangkok, Thailand	KO (punches)	4	0:56
Defended the Rajadamnern Stadium Super Welterweight (154 lbs) title.
2025-12-27	Win	(Thailand) Petchmorakot Petchyindee Academy	Rajadamnern World Series, Rajadamnern Stadium 80th Anniversary	Bangkok, Thailand	Decision (unanimous)	5	3:00
Defended the Rajadamnern Stadium Super Welterweight (154 lbs) title.
2025-07-26	Win	(Thailand) PheuThai Por.Panomporn	Rajadamnern World Series	Bangkok, Thailand	KO (punches)	2	2:40
Defended the Rajadamnern Stadium Super Welterweight (154 lbs) title.
2024-12-14	Win	(Thailand) Rittewada Petchyindee Academy	Rajadamnern World Series - Final	Bangkok, Thailand	Decision (unanimous)	5	3:00
Won the 2024 Rajadamnern World Series Super Welterweight (154 lbs) title.
2024-11-09	Win	(Azerbaijan) Ruslan Naghiev	Rajadamnern World Series - Final 4	Bangkok, Thailand	Decision (unanimous)	3	3:00
2024-10-05	Win	(Belarus) Pavel Hryshanovich	Rajadamnern World Series - Group Stage	Bangkok, Thailand	KO (punches)	2	1:25
2024-08-31	Win	(Thailand) Rasising AyothayaFightGym	Rajadamnern World Series - Group Stage	Bangkok, Thailand	KO (right hook)	2	1:15
2024-07-27	Win	(Thailand) Thananchai Sitsongpeenong	Rajadamnern World Series - Group Stage	Bangkok, Thailand	Decision (unanimous)	3	3:00
2023-10-21	Win	(Thailand) Sornkhaw Sitkamnanlue	Rajadamnern World Series	Bangkok, Thailand	KO (left cross)	1	2:13
Defended the Rajadamnern Stadium Super Welterweight (154 lbs) title.
2023-09-09	Loss	(Thailand) Yodwicha Por Boonsit	Rajadamnern World Series - Final 4	Bangkok, Thailand	Decision (unanimous)	3	3:00
2023-08-05	Win	(Russia) Artem VenumMuayThai	Rajadamnern World Series - Group Stage	Bangkok, Thailand	Decision (unanimous)	3	3:00
2023-07-01	Win	(England) Brad Stanton	Rajadamnern World Series - Group Stage	Bangkok, Thailand	Decision (unanimous)	3	3:00
2023-05-27	Win	(Thailand) Thananchai Sitsongpeenong	Rajadamnern World Series - Group Stage	Bangkok, Thailand	Decision (split)	3	3:00
2022-12-23	Win	(Thailand) Yodwicha Por Boonsit	Rajadamnern World Series - Final	Bangkok, Thailand	Decision (split)	5	3:00
Won the 2022 Rajadamnern World Series Super Welterweight (154 lbs) title.
2022-11-18	Win	(Thailand) Satanfah Sitsongpeenong	Rajadamnern World Series - Final 4	Bangkok, Thailand	TKO (punches)	1	2:45
2022-10-14	Win	(Iran) Parham Gheirati	Rajadamnern World Series	Bangkok, Thailand	TKO (doctor stoppage)	3	
2022-09-09	Win	(Thailand) Yodwicha Por Boonsit	Rajadamnern World Series	Bangkok, Thailand	Decision (split)	3	3:00
2022-08-05	Win	(Thailand) Rungrat Pumpanmuang	Rajadamnern World Series	Bangkok, Thailand	KO (punches)	2	1:05
2022-06-01	Win	(Thailand) Saenpon Petchphachara	Muay Thai Palangmai, Rajadamnern Stadium	Bangkok, Thailand	Decision	5	3:00
Won the vacant Rajadamnern Stadium Super Welterweight (154 lbs) title.
2022-04-27	Win	(Czech Republic) Domenico Naswetter	Sor.Sommai, Rajadamnern Stadium	Bangkok, Thailand	KO	2	
2022-03-30	Win	(Thailand) Palangnum PhuketAirport	Sor.Sommai, Rajadamnern Stadium	Bangkok, Thailand	TKO (flying knee and punch)	3	
2021-12-18	Win	(Algeria) Brahim Akrour	Zurcher Kampfnacht	Zürich, Switzerland	KO (Middle kick + body punches)	1	
2021-08-21	Win	(France) Valentin Thibaut	Fight Time X	Recherswil, Switzerland	Decision (unanimous)	5	3:00
Won the vacant WBC MuayThai European Super Welterweight (154 lbs) title.
2020-08-22	Win	(France) Mathieu Tavares	Fight Time	Recherswil, Switzerland	Decision	5	3:00
2020-02-01	Win	(France) Sabri Sadouki	GVA Fight Night 2	Geneva, Switzerland	KO (high kick)	2	
2019-06-29	Win	(France) Florian Bréau	Fight Time	Zürich, Switzerland	TKO	2	
2019-04-28	Win	(Thailand) Yodkhunsuk Muangsima	Chujaroen, Rajadamnern Stadium	Bangkok, Thailand	TKO (low kicks)	2	
2019-04-01	Win	(Thailand) Mike Sor.Poolsawat	Chujaroen, Rajadamnern Stadium	Bangkok, Thailand	KO (spinning back elbow)	4	
2019-03-06	Win	(Thailand) Amery Chuwattana	Chujaroen, Rajadamnern Stadium	Bangkok, Thailand	KO	1	
2018-11-03	Win	(Switzerland) Bruno Pineiro	Superfight 13	Zürich, Switzerland	Decision	3	3:00
2017-12-08	Win	(Thailand) Rit Kaewsamrit	Fight Night	Dietikon, Switzerland	Decision	3	3:00
2017-09-30	Win	(France) Thibaut Arias	Zurcher Kampfnacht	Zürich, Switzerland	TKO (doctor stoppage)	1	
2017-01-07	Win	(Austria) Ruslan Toktharov	Fight Time VI	Recherswil, Switzerland	Decision	3	3:00
2016-07-09	Win	(France) Antonin Marconi	Fight Time V	Recherswil, Switzerland	TKO (doctor stoppage)	2	
2016-02-27	Win	(France) Guillaume Pascal	Road to Bangkok IV	Cernier, Switzerland	Decision	3	3:00
2015-12-05	Win	(Germany) Alexander Epp	Swiss Las Vegas, Final	Spreitenbach, Switzerland	KO	1	
2015-12-05	Win	(Germany) Dennis Haddad	Swiss Las Vegas, Semi Final	Spreitenbach, Switzerland	Decision	3	3:00
2015-11-07	Win	(Switzerland) Guillaume Galster	Muaythai Superfight	Zürich, Switzerland	TKO (referee stoppage)	1	
2015-04-30	Win	(France) Thomas Lelièvre	Road to Bangkok III	Cernier, Switzerland	Decision	3	3:00
2015-04-11	Win	(Switzerland) Zammim Ayubi	Warrior Challenge	Zürich, Switzerland	Decision	3	3:00
2015-02-	Win	(Switzerland)		Zürich, Switzerland			
2014-11-08	Win	(Switzerland) Valdrin Igrishta	Natthapong SUPER FIGHT NIGHT	Zürich, Switzerland	Decision	3	3:00
2014-09-06	Win	(Switzerland)	Warrior Challenge	Zürich, Switzerland			
2014-07-05	Win	(Switzerland) Pascal Locher	Thai Festival Bern 2014	Bern, Switzerland	Decision	3	3:00
Legend: Win Loss Draw/No contest Notes
