= Satanfah Rachanon =

Muay Thai fighter

- Born: January 19, 1996 (age 30); Rattaphum District, Songkhla Province, Thailand
- Other names: Satanfah Sitsongpeenong; Satanfah Sitnayokchai; Satanfah Puicharleefresh; Satanfah Sitsarawatkai
- Nationality: Thai
- Height: 178 cm (5 ft 10 in)
- Weight: 70 kg (154 lb; 11 st)
- Style: Muay Khao
- Stance: Orthodox
- Fighting out of: Bangkok, Thailand
- Team: Sitsongpeenong Muaythai; Rachanon

Kickboxing record
- Total: 103
- Wins: 78
- Losses: 22
- Draws: 3

Satanfah Rachanon (Thai: สะท้านฟ้า ราชานนท์; born January 19, 1996), also known as Satanfah Sitsongpeenong, is a Thai Muay Thai fighter. Satanfah is a former WBC Muay Thai 154lbs World Champion.

For the WBC July 2024 world rankings, he is ranked the number 2 contender in the super welterweight division. For June 2024, he is ranked the number 7 contender in the super welterweight division of the Rajadamnern Stadium rankings.

== Titles and accomplishments ==
- World Boxing Council Muay Thai
  - 2019 WBC Muay Thai World Super Welterweight / 154lbs Champion
- THAI FIGHT
  - 2018 THAI FIGHT 70kg Champion
  - 2018 Isuzu Cup Super Fight 67 kg Champion
- Omnoi Stadium
  - 2018 Isuzu Cup Tournament Winner

== Muay Thai record ==
78 Wins, 23 Losses, 3 Draws
Date	Result	Opponent	Event	Location	Method	Round	Time
2024-07-13	Loss	(Thailand) Beckham BigWinChampionGym	Rajadamnern World Series	Bangkok, Thailand	Decision (Unanimous)	3	3:00
2024-06-01	Win	(Azerbaijan) Mahabbat Humbatov	World League of Fighters, Lumpinee Stadium	Bangkok, Thailand	Decision (Unanimous)	3	3:00
2024-04-06	Loss	(United Kingdom) Josh Hill (kickboxer)	Rajadamnern World Series	Bangkok, Thailand	Decision (Unanimous)	3	3:00
2024-03-02	Win	(France) Julian Carre	Rajadamnern World Series	Bangkok, Thailand	Decision (Unanimous)	3	3:00
2023-12-23	Loss	(Thailand) Shadow Singmawynn	Rajadamnern World Series	Bangkok, Thailand	Decision (Unanimous)	3	3:00
2023-11-24	Loss	(Russia) Nikita Gerasimovich	Adrenaline	Chelyabinsk, Russia	KO	2	
2023-09-16	Win	(Turkey) Burak Poyraz	Rajadamnern World Series	Bangkok, Thailand	Decision (Unanimous)	3	3:00
2023-07-21	Loss	(Iran) Mohammad Siasarani	ONE Friday Fights 26, Lumpinee Stadium	Bangkok, Thailand	KO (Punches)	1	2:26
2023-05-05	Loss	(United Kingdom) Josh Hill (kickboxer)	ONE Friday Fights 15, Lumpinee Stadium	Bangkok, Thailand	Decision (Unanimous)	3	3:00
2023-03-04	Win	(Iran) Ashkan VenumMuayThai	Rajadamnern World Series	Bangkok, Thailand	TKO (punches)	3	2:12
2023-01-28	Loss	(Cambodia) Chhoeung Lvai	IPCC Kun Khmer	Battambang, Cambodia	TKO	3	1:25
2022-12-23	Win	(Turkey) Furkan WMC Lamai Muay Thai	Rajadamnern World Series	Bangkok, Thailand	Decision	5	3:00
2022-11-18	Loss	(Switzerland) Daniel SinbiMuaythai	Rajadamnern World Series - Semi Final	Bangkok, Thailand	TKO (Punches)	1	2:45
2022-10-14	Win	(Thailand) Petch-U-Bon Sitchefboontham	Rajadamnern World Series - Group Stage	Bangkok, Thailand	Decision (Unanimous)	3	3:00
2022-09-09	Win	(Iran) Reza Ahmadnezhad	Rajadamnern World Series - Group Stage	Bangkok, Thailand	Decision (Unanimous)	3	3:00
2022-08-05	Loss	(Brazil) Cajaiba PhuketFightClub	Rajadamnern World Series - Group Stage	Bangkok, Thailand	Decision (Majority)	3	3:00
2022-06-25	Draw	(Cambodia) Thoeun Theara	IPCC Kun Khmer	Svay Rieng, Cambodia	Decision	3	3:00
2022-03-19	Win	(France) Thibault Kinsonnier	Muay Hardcore	Phuket, Thailand	TKO (Doctor Stoppage)	2	
2022-01-22	Win	(Iran) Reza Ahmadnezhad	Muay Hardcore	Phuket, Thailand	Decision	3	3:00
2021-03-27	Win	(Brazil) Luis Cajaiba	WSS Fights, World Siam Stadium	Bangkok, Thailand	KO (Right Elbow)	4	
2020-11-02	Win	(Thailand) Khunsuk Sitchefboontham	Chef Boontham, Rangsit Stadium	Rangsit, Thailand	Decision	5	3:00
2020-02-23	Loss	(Thailand) Yodwicha Por Boonsit	Authentic Mix Martial Arts	Phuket, Thailand	KO (Elbow)	2	
Lost the WBC Muay Thai World 154 lbs title.
2019-09-09	Win	(Australia) Chadd Collins	Lumpinee Stadium	Bangkok, Thailand	Decision	5	3:00
Wins the vacant WBC Muay Thai World 154 lbs title.
2018-12-22	Win	(Uzbekistan) Bobirjon Tagaev	THAI FIGHT Nakhon Ratchasima	Nakhon Ratchasima, Thailand	Decision	3	3:00
Wins the 2018 THAI FIGHT 70kg / 154lbs title.
2018-11-24	Win	(China) Wang Tengyue	THAI FIGHT Saraburi	Saraburi, Thailand	Decision	3	3:00
2018-10-27	Win	(Morocco) Brahim Machkour	THAI FIGHT Chiangrai 2018	Chiang Rai, Thailand	KO (Left Knee to the Body)	1	
2018-08-25	Win	(Brazil) Luis Cajaiba	THAI FIGHT Rayong	Rayong, Thailand	Decision	3	3:00
2018-07-07	Win	(Ukraine) Oleksandr Moisa	THAI FIGHT Hat Yai	Hat Yai, Thailand	Ext R. Decision	4	3:00
2018-05-12	Win	(Thailand) Pakorn PKSaenchaimuaythaigym	THAI FIGHT Samui 2018	Ko Samui, Thailand	Decision	3	3:00
2018-03-17	Win	(Thailand) Chalamphet Tor.Laksong	Siam Omnoi Boxing Stadium - Isuzu Cup Final	Thailand	Decision	5	3:00
Wins the 2018 Siam Omnoi Isuzu Cup.
2018-01-20	Win	(Thailand) Faipa Sor.Narongrit	Siam Omnoi Boxing Stadium - Isuzu Cup Semi Final	Samut Sakhon, Thailand	Decision	5	3:00
2017-11-18	Win	(Thailand) Chaidet M-16	Siam Omnoi Boxing Stadium - Isuzu Cup	Samut Sakhon, Thailand	Decision	5	3:00
2017-09-23	Loss	(Thailand) Phonek Or.Kwanmuang	Siam Omnoi Boxing Stadium - Isuzu Cup	Samut Sakhon, Thailand	Decision	5	3:00
2017-08-26	Win	(Thailand) Payaluang Flukebamikiew	Siam Omnoi Boxing Stadium	Samut Sakhon, Thailand	Decision	5	3:00
2017-06-11	Win	(Thailand) Simanut Sor.Sarinya	Rangsit Boxing Stadium	Thailand	Decision	5	3:00
2017-05-14	Win	(Thailand) Khunsuek Aikbangsai	Blue Arena	Samut Prakan, Thailand	KO (Elbows)	3	
2017-03-30	Loss	(Thailand) Noppakrit Kor.Kampanat	Rangsit Boxing Stadium	Thailand	Decision	5	3:00
2017-02-17	Loss	(Thailand) Singsuriya Mor.Rattanabandit	Rangsit Boxing Stadium	Rangsit, Thailand	Decision	5	3:00
2016-12-20	Win	(Thailand) Rungnapa Pinsinchai	Rajadamnern Stadium	Bangkok, Thailand	KO	2	
2016-12-16	Win	(Thailand) Senphet Sangmorakot		Thailand	KO	3	
2016-09-04	Loss	(Thailand) Nontakit Tor. Morsee	Channel 7 Boxing Stadium	Bangkok, Thailand	Decision	5	3:00
2016-08-05	Win	(France) Rafi Bohic	Kiatpetch Show	Thailand	Decision	5	3:00
2016-07-03	Loss	(Thailand) Chujaroen Dabransarakarm	Rajadamnern Stadium	Bangkok, Thailand	Decision	5	3:00
2016-03-20	Loss	(Thailand) Nontakit Tor. Morsee	Channel 7 Boxing Stadium	Bangkok, Thailand	KO	4	
2016-02-12	Win	(Thailand) Chujaroen Dabransarakarm	Lumpinee Stadium	Bangkok, Thailand	Decision	5	3:00
2016-01-16	Win	(Thailand) Padsenlek Rachanon	Lumpinee Stadium	Bangkok, Thailand	Decision	5	3:00
2015-11-21	Loss	(Thailand) Manasak Sor.Jor.Lekmuangnon		Uthai Thani, Thailand	Decision	5	3:00
2015-10-13	Loss	(Thailand) Chamuaktong Fightermuaythai	Lumpinee Stadium	Bangkok, Thailand	Decision	5	3:00
2015-08-28	Win	(Thailand) Rambo Pet.Por.Tor.Or	Lumpinee Stadium	Bangkok, Thailand	Decision	5	3:00
2015-07-21	Win	(Thailand) Faipa Sor.Narongrit	Lumpinee Stadium	Bangkok, Thailand	Decision	5	3:00
2015-06-28	Win	(Thailand) Newwangjan Pakornpornsurin	Channel 7 Boxing Stadium	Bangkok, Thailand	Decision	5	3:00
2015-05-20	Win	(Thailand) Chaopatcharapol	Rajadamnern Stadium	Bangkok, Thailand	Decision	5	3:00
2015-04-12	Win	(Thailand) Abbass Luksuan	Channel 7 Boxing Stadium	Bangkok, Thailand	Decision	5	3:00
2015-02-22	Loss	(Thailand) Phetnamek P.K.SaenchaiMuaythaiGym	Rajadamnern Stadium	Bangkok, Thailand	Decision	5	3:00
2014-12-10	Win	(Thailand) Phichitchai Ror.Kilacorat	Lumpinee Stadium	Bangkok, Thailand	Decision	5	3:00
Legend: Win Loss Draw/No contest Notes

== Karate Combat record ==
Res.	Record	Opponent	Method	Event	Date	Round	Time	Location	Notes
Win	1-0	Nikita Gerasimovich	Decision (unanimous)	Karate Combat: Kickback 3	November 14, 2024	3	3:00	Bangkok, Thailand	
