= Azize Hlali =

French-Moroccan Muay Thai fighter

- Born: December 7, 1989 (age 36); Paris, France
- Other names: The Magician
- Nationality: (France) French (Morocco) Moroccan
- Height: 1.80 m (5 ft 11 in)
- Weight: 65.8 kg (145 lb; 10.36 st)
- Division: Welterweight; Light welterweight
- Style: Muay Thai
- Fighting out of: Paris, France
- Team: Venum Training Camp

Kickboxing record
- Total: 119
- Wins: 99
- Losses: 18
- Draws: 2

Azize Hlali (born December 7, 1989) is a French-Moroccan welterweight Muay Thai fighter. He is a former WPMF European Champion.

== Biography and career ==
At the age of 12, Hlali took up practicing Muay Thai.

On April 9, 2011, he defeated Daniel Rivero Garcia via second-round TKO to win the WPMF European 142 lb title.

On April 29, 2017, Azize Hlali faced the legendary Saenchai at Phoenix Fighting Championship in Lebanon, where he lost by unanimous decision.

Azize Hlali fought former two-time K-1 World MAX champion Buakaw Banchamek in the inaugural event of All Star Fight on August 20, 2017, losing to the legend by first-round knockout.

On October 28, 2017, Azize Hlali faced Abdellah Ezbiri in the 2017 Glory Featherweight Contender Tournament at Glory 47: Lyon, losing by unanimous decision.

Hlali faced Serhiy Adamchuk at Glory 53: Lille in the 2018 Glory Featherweight Contender Tournament on May 12, 2018, getting eliminated by the Ukrainian via a unanimous decision loss in the Semi-Final.

Azize Hlali was initially scheduled to make his ONE Championship debut at ONE Championship: Immortal Triumph on September 6, 2019 against Saemapetch Fairtex, filling in for an injured Rafi Bohic. However, the fight was pulled from the event. Hlali finally made his ONE debut at ONE Championship: Masters Of Fate on November 8, 2019. He faced Muay Thai phenom Sangmanee Sor Tienpo. Hlali ended up losing the fight by unanimous decision.

== Titles and accomplishments ==
=== Muay Thai ===
- Fight League
  - 2016 Fight League 147 lbs. Championship
- World Professional Muaythai Federation (WPMF)
  - 2011 WPMF European 142 lbs. Championship
- Fédération Française de Sports de Contacts et Disciplines Associées (FFSCDA)
  - 2010 FFSCDA National 140 lbs. Championship

== Muay Thai record ==
Muay Thai record
99 Wins, 18 Losses, 2 Draws
Date	Result	Opponent	Event	Location	Method	Round	Time
2019-11-08	Loss	(Thailand) Sangmanee Sor Tienpo	ONE Championship: Masters Of Fate	Manila, Philippines	Decision (Unanimous)	3	3:00
2019-01-19	Loss	(France) Cédrick Peynaud	Nuit Des Gladiateurs 10	Marseille, France	KO	3	
2018-12-01	Draw	(Australia) Chadd Collins	Credissimo Golden Fight	France	Decision	5	3:00
2018-05-12	Loss	(Ukraine) Serhiy Adamchuk	Glory 53: Lille	Lille, France	Decision (Unanimous)	3	3:00
2018 Glory Featherweight Contender Tournament Semi-Finals.
2017-10-28	Loss	(France) Abdellah Ezbiri	Glory 47: Lyon	Lyon, France	Decision	3	3:00
2017 Glory Featherweight Contender Tournament Semi-Finals.
2017-09-22	Loss	(United Kingdom) Charlie Peters	Phoenix 3 London	London, United Kingdom	Decision	3	3:00
2017-08-20	Loss	(Thailand) Buakaw Banchamek	All Star Fight	Bangkok, Thailand	KO	1	
2017-07-01	Win	(Thailand) Noppakit Kor Kampanart	Chook Muay	France	Decision	3	3:00
2017-05-27	Win	(France) Morgan Adrar	Warriors Night	France	Decision	3	3:00
2017-04-29	Loss	(Thailand) Saenchai	Phoenix Fighting Championship 2	Lebanon	Decision	3	3:00
2017-03-18	Loss	(Thailand) Yodwicha Por Boonsit	La Nuit Des Titans	France	Decision	5	3:00
2016-11-27	Win	(Thailand) Fahmongkol Sor.Jor.Danrayong	Warriors Night	France	Decision	5	3:00
2016-10-28	Loss	(Thailand) Phetmorakot Wor. Sangprapai	YOKKAO 21 & 22	Hong Kong	KO	2	
2016-08-04	Win	(China) Qiu Jianliang	Fight League vs. WLF	Morocco	Decision	3	3:00
Wins the Fight League 147lbs. title.
2016-05-27	Loss	(Thailand) Manaowan Sitsongpeenong	Rajadamnern Stadium	Bangkok, Thailand	Decision	5	3:00
For the Rajadamnern Stadium 147lbs. title.
2016-03-12	Loss	(France) Fabio Pinca	La Nuit Des Titans	France	Decision (Split)	5	3:00
2015-12-11	Win	(Thailand) Kongsak Sitboonmee	Best of Siam 7	France	Decision	5	3:00
2015-08-07	Win	(Thailand) Singmanee Kaewsamrit	West Coast Fighting	France	Decision	5	3:00
2015-06-19	Win	(Thailand) Singdam Kiatmuu9	Best of Siam 6	France	Decision	5	3:00
2014-11-15	Loss	(Poland) Marcin Parcheta	Topking World Series	France	KO	3	
2014-06-14	Loss	(France) Morgan Adrar	Best of Siam 5	France	Decision	5	3:00
2014-05-10	Loss	(Thailand) Sak Kaoponlek	La Notte dei Campioni	Italy	TKO	2	
2014-02-08	Loss	(Thailand) Rungrawee P.K. Saenchai Muaythaigym	La Nuit Des Titans	France	Decision	5	3:00
2013-11-30	Loss	(Thailand) Fahmongkol Sor.Jor.Danrayong	THAI FIGHT 2013: 2nd Round - 67 kg Tournament Semi-Final	Bangkok, Thailand	TKO	2	
2013-10-23	Win	(France) Morgan Adrar	THAI FIGHT 2013: 1st Round - 67 kg Tournament Quarter-Final	Bangkok, Thailand	Decision	3	3:00
2013-06-15	Draw	(Thailand) Super-X Por. Petchnamchai	Time Fight 3	France	Decision	3	3:00
2013-03-17	Loss	(Thailand) Singmanee Kaewsamrit	World Muay Thai Festival 2013	Thailand	Decision	5	3:00
For the WPMF World 147lbs. title.
2013-02-02	Loss	(Thailand) Super-X Por. Petchnamchai	La Nuit Des Titans	France	TKO	2	
2012-10-06	Win	(France) Bobo Sacko	Time Fight 2	France	Decision	3	3:00
2011-10-15	Win	(France) Frédéric Diaz	Le Choc des Titans 2	France	Decision	3	3:00
2011-07-08	Win	(Italy) Alessio D'Angelo	Impacts Muaythai Show & Party Mix	France	Decision	5	3:00
2011-04-09	Win	(Spain) Daniel Rivero Garcia	Time Fight 3	France	TKO	2	
Wins the WPMF European 142lbs. title.
2011-02-12	Win	(Thailand) Yodsiam Por. Pramuk	La Nuit Des Titans	France	Decision	5	3:00
2010-10-16	Win	(France) Modibo Diarra	Le Choc Des Titans	France	Decision	3	3:00
2010-08-11	Loss	(Thailand) Thanasak Topking	Queen's Birthday	Bangkok, Thailand	Decision	5	3:00
2010-04-24	Win	(France) Vatsana Sedone	Fight Night	France	Decision	3	3:00
2010-04-03	Win	(France) Sidi Diallo	Finales du Championnat de France de Muaythai	France	Decision	5	3:00
Wins the FFSCDA National 140lbs. title.
2010-02-27	Win	(France) Yoan Ha Van	La Nuit du Muay Thai VII	France	Decision	5	3:00
2009-04-11	Win	(France) Adrien Gref	Muay Thai & Pancrase II	France	KO	5	
Legend: Win Loss Draw/No contest Notes

== Mixed martial arts record ==
Professional record breakdown
3 matches	2 wins	1 loss
By knockout	2	0
By submission	0	1

Res.	Record	Opponent	Method	Event	Date	Round	Time	Location	Notes
Loss	2–1	Josh O'Connor	Submission (rear-naked choke)	Ares FC 28	January 18, 2025	2	3:36	Nice, France	For the vacant Ares FC Featherweight Championship.
Win	2–0	Alberto Ponzio	TKO (punches)	Ares FC 22	June 14, 2024	1	0:49	Paris, France	Catchweight (152 lb) bout.
Win	1–0	Mossab El Marzkioui	TKO (retirement)	Ares FC 19	March 8, 2024	2	4:43	Aubervilliers, France	Featherweight debut.

== See also ==
- List of male kickboxers
