= Yodwicha Por.Boonsit =

Thai professional Muay Thai fighter

- Born: Komsan Tantakhob; April 18, 1996 (age 30); Nakhon Ratchasima, Thailand
- Other names: Yodwicha Yodwicha Gym; Yodwicha Sor. Sanun Farm; Yodwicha Chor Haphayak; Yodwicha Banchamek; Yodwicha Kem Muay Thai Gym; Yodwicha S. Suksan Gym 耀威猜
- Height: 179 cm (5 ft 10 in)
- Division: Super Featherweight; Lightweight; Super Lightweight; Super Welterweight; Welterweight
- Style: Muay Thai (Muay Khao)
- Fighting out of: Bangkok, Thailand
- Team: Bangtao Muay Thai & MMA Gym; Yodwicha Gym; LookSuan MuayThai Camp; Banchamek Gym; Kem Muay Thai Gym; SangMorakot Gym
- Trainer: Pradit Saridappirak

Kickboxing record
- Total: 267
- Wins: 202
- Losses: 59
- Draws: 5
- No contests: 1

Komsan Tantakhob (Thai: คมสัน ทันตะขบ; born April 18, 1996), known professionally as Yodwicha Por.Boonsit (Thai: ยอดวิชา ภ.บุญสิทธิ์), is a retired Thai professional Muay Thai fighter. He is a former Lumpinee Stadium Featherweight Champion and the 2012 Sports Writers Association of Thailand Fighter of the Year.

He holds notable wins over Saenchai, Singdam Kiatmuu9, Nong-O Kaiyanghadaogym and Petchboonchu FA Group.

== Career ==
On 29 March 2012 he was named the Sportswriters of Thailand boxer of the year, an award he shared with fellow teenager Sangmanee Sor Tienpo.

He defeated legend Saenchai PKSaenchaimuaythaigym on points at Lumpinee on May 10, 2013. The pair were set to rematch on June 7, 2013, but a lingering neck injury forced Saenchai out of the bout.

He beat Wanchalerm Aodoonmuang by decision at Lumpinee on July 16, 2013, in the second defence of his lightweight title.

He beat Singdam Kiatmoo9 on points in a rematch at Rajadamnern on August 8, 2013.

On January 7, 2014, he won the Thai Light Welterweight title, beating Chamuaktong Sor Yupinda by decision.

On February 7, 2014, Yodwicha was supposed to fight Chamuaktong Sor Yupinda again, this time for the Light Welterweight title Thailand and the Light Welterweight Lumpinee title, but failed to make weight.

In 2014, Yodwicha fought Petchboonchu FA Group five times in a row. He lost the first and third fight and the fighters tied the second fight, while Yodwicha won the fourth and fifth fight. Yodwicha had already beaten Petboonchu twice in earlier fights, taking his record up to 4-2-1 against Petboonchu.

On August 4, 2015, Yodwicha fought his first fight in Europe. He fought Frenchman Jimmy Vienot in Saint Tropez, France and won by decision after five rounds.

After a surprise defeat at the hands of Ritthevada Sittikul, Yodwicha bounced back by besting Bobo Sacko in his second fight in Europe on 13 December, winning the match by decision after 5 rounds.

Yodwicha took on Zhao Yan on 5 March at the Wu Lin Feng World Championship 2016 event in Zhengzhou, China. The fight was held at 71 kg and Yodwicha won by decision.

After suffering another 5 round decision loss at the hands of Ritthevada in Bangkok, Yodwicha headed back to France to take on Jimmy Vienot in a rematch. The result was a repetition of their first fight, as Yodwicha took the decision after 5 rounds. Yodwicha would then travel to China to take on Englishman Brad Stanton and Belarusian Dmitry Varets at Top King World Series 9 and 10, respectively. He beat both fighters by decision.

Yodwicha is a two-time 'Topking World Series' tournament champion in 2016 and 2017. He won his first championship belt by decision against the Russian fighter Arbi Emiev, and his second by knockout against the German fighter Pascal Schroth.

Yodwicha is expected to fight Dzianis Zuev at Kunlun Fight 62 on June 10, 2017, in Bangkok, Thailand.

In 2018, Yodwicha defeated Superbon in the IFMA qualifiers, securing his place on the Thai national team for the World Championships. At the World Championships held in Mexico, Yodwicha advanced to the final, where he emerged victorious against Belarusian Andrei Kulebin, earning the gold medal.

On February 23, 2020, Yodwicha defeated Satanfah Rachanon by second-round knockout to win the WBC Muaythai Super Welterweight Champion.

On July 4, 2021, Yodwicha defeated Braian Allevato by first-round technical knockout at THAI FIGHT Strong.

Yodwicha was scheduled to challenge Jimmy Vienot for the WMC Middleweight Championship at Empire Fight: Vikings Edition on October 2, 2021. He lost by controversial decision.

On September 9, 2022, Yodwicha faced the reigning Rajadamnern Stadium super welterweight champion Daniel Rodriguez in the second round of the Rajadamnern World Series group phase. He lost the fight by split decision.

In kickboxing, on January 20, 2024, Yodwicha won the 'EM-Legend 45' tournament in the 154-pound weight class. In the final, he won by decision against the Chinese fighter Liu Lei.

On March 30, 2024, Yodwicha won the interim Rajadamnern Stadium Super Welterweight title by knocking out Burak Poyraz.

On June 15, 2024, at the 'EM-Legend 46' four-man kickboxing tournament held in China, Yodwicha defeated ISKA champion Matthew Stevens by decision in the semifinals, securing the ISKA Oriental rules super welterweight intercontinental championship and advancing to the final. In the final, he won by unanimous decision against Belarusian Dzianis Zuev, earning the 'EM-Legend' intercontinental gold belt.

On November 14, 2024, Yodwicha is set to make his debut in Bangkok at the 'Karate Combat: Kickback 3 – The Thai Invasion' event, where he will face Turkish fighter Kenan Bayramov.

On October 7, 2025, at EM Legend 50 held in China, Yodwicha defeated his Chinese challenger Luo Chao by TKO to retain the EM Legend Intercontinental Championship title in the 70 kg division.

On July 10, 2026, Yodwicha was defeated by Chinese challenger Han Wenbao via unanimous decision in the main event of EM Legend 51, with Han capturing the EM Legend Intercontinental Championship in the 70 kg weight class.

== Titles and accomplishments ==
=== Muay Thai ===
- Omnoi Stadium
  - 2012 Omnoi Stadium Featherweight (126 lbs) Champion
- Lumpinee Stadium
  - 2012 Lumpinee Stadium Super Featherweight (130 lbs) Champion
  - 2013 Lumpinee Stadium Fighter of the Year
- Professional Boxing Association of Thailand (PAT)
  - 2013 Thailand Lightweight (135 lbs) Champion
  - 2014 Thailand Super Lightweight (140 lbs) Champion
- Topking World Series
  - 2016 Topking World Series Super Welterweight (154 lbs) Tournament Champion
  - 2017 Topking World Series Super Welterweight (154 lbs) Tournament Champion
- WBC Muay Thai
  - 2020 WBC Muay Thai World Super Welterweight (154 lbs) Champion
- Rajadamnern Stadium
  - 2022 Rajadamnern World Series Super Welterweight (154 lbs) Runner-up
  - 2023 Rajadamnern World Series Super Welterweight (154 lbs) Runner-up
  - 2024 Interim Rajadamnern Stadium Super Welterweight (154 lbs) Champion
  - 2024 Rajadamnern World Series Welterweight (147 lbs) Runner-up
- Army Games
  - 2018 Army Games -71 kg Tournament Champion
- I.F.M.A. World Muaythai
  - 2018 I.F.M.A. World Muaythai Champion (71 kg) (gold)

=== Kickboxing ===
- EM Legend
  - 2024 EM Legend Super Welterweight (154 lbs) Continental Tournament Champion
  - 2024 EM Legend Super Welterweight (154 lbs) Intercontinental Champion
    - One successful title defense
- ISKA
  - 2024 ISKA Oriental Rules Intercontinental Super Welterweight (154 lbs) Champion

=== Awards ===
- Sports Writers Association of Thailand
  - 2012 Sports Writers Association of Thailand Fighter of the Year (shared with Sangmanee Sor.Tienpo)
- Siam Kela
  - 2012 Siam Kela Fighter of the Year
- Royal Trophy Boxer Award
  - 2012 Royal Trophy Boxer Award Of King Bhumibol Adulyadej, King Rama IX.

== Muay Thai and Kickboxing record ==
Professional Muay Thai Record
202 Wins, 59 Losses, 5 Draws, 1 No Contest
Date	Result	Opponent	Event	Location	Method	Round	Time
2026-11-28		(Iran) Amir Yousefi	Rajadamnern World Series	Bangkok, Thailand			
2026-07-10	Loss	(China) Han Wenbao	EM Legend 51	Ankang, China	Decision (Unanimous)	5	3:00
For the EM-Legend 70 kg Intercontinental title.
2025-10-07	Win	(China) Luo Chao	EM Legend 50	Qionglai, China	TKO	1	1:51
Defends the EM-Legend 70 kg Intercontinental title.
2025-01-19	Draw	(China) Wang Xin	EM Legend 47	Pengzhou, China	Draw	4	3:00
2024-10-19	Loss	(Thailand) Tapaokaew Singmawynn	Rajadamnern World Series - Final 4	Bangkok, Thailand	Decision (Unanimous)	3	3:00
2024-09-07	Win	(Iran) Sajad Sattari	Rajadamnern World Series - Group Stage	Bangkok, Thailand	Decision (Split)	3	3:00
2024-08-03	Loss	(Thailand) Hercules Wor.Jakrawut	Rajadamnern World Series - Group Stage	Bangkok, Thailand	Decision (Unanimous)	3	3:00
2024-06-22	Win	(Australia) Max Mcvicker	Rajadamnern World Series - Group Stage	Bangkok, Thailand	Decision (Unanimous)	3	3:00
2024-06-15	Win	(Belarus) Dzianis Zuev	EM Legend 46, Final	Chongqing, China	Decision (Unanimous)	3	3:00
Wins the EM-Legend Intercontinental 70 kg title.
2024-06-15	Win	(Australia) Matthew Stevens	EM Legend 46, Semifinals	Chongqing, China	Decision (Unanimous)	3	3:00
Wins the ISKA Oriental rules Intercontinental Super-welterweight (70 kg) title.
2024-04-27	Win	(China) Luo Jie	Rajadamnern World Series	Bangkok, Thailand	TKO (Doctor stoppage)	1	3:00
2024-03-30	Win	(Turkey) Burak Poyraz	Rajadamnern World Series Sanjorn	Nakhon Ratchasima province, Thailand	TKO (Elbow)	1	1:24
Win the interim Rajadamnern Stadium Super Welterweight (154 lbs) title.
2024-01-20	Win	(China) Liu Lei	EM Legend 45, Final	China	Decision	3	3:00
Wins the EM-Legend tournament (154 lbs / 70 kg).
2024-01-20	Win	(Iran) Abolfazl Alipour	EM Legend 45, Semifinals	China	Decision	3	3:00
2023-12-09	Win	(Japan) Izaya Matsushima	Rajadamnern World Series	Bangkok, Thailand	KO	2	
2023-10-21	Win	(China) Liu Yunlong	EM Legend 44	Chongqing, China	Decision (Unanimous)	3	3:00
2023-10-07	Loss	(Thailand) Thananchai Sitsongpeenong	Rajadamnern World Series - Final	Bangkok, Thailand	Decision (Unanimous)	5	3:00
For the 2023 Rajadamnern World Series Super Welterweight (154 lbs) title.
2023-09-09	Win	(Switzerland) Daniel Rodriguez	Rajadamnern World Series - Final 4	Bangkok, Thailand	Decision (Unanimous)	3	3:00
2023-08-05	Win	(Thailand) Shadow Singmawynn	Rajadamnern World Series - Group Stage	Bangkok, Thailand	Decision (Unanimous)	3	3:00
2023-07-01	Loss	(Thailand) Petchmorakot Petchyindee Academy	Rajadamnern World Series - Group Stage	Bangkok, Thailand	Decision (Unanimous)	3	3:00
2023-05-27	Win	(Turkey) Burak Poyraz	Rajadamnern World Series - Group Stage	Bangkok, Thailand	Decision (Unanimous)	3	3:00
2023-04-01	Win	(Algeria) Walid Otmane	RWS + Sasipapha, Rajadamnern Stadium	Bangkok, Thailand	TKO (Doctor stoppage/cut)	3	
2022-12-23	Loss	(Switzerland) Daniel Rodriguez	Rajadamnern World Series - Final	Bangkok, Thailand	Decision (Split)	5	3:00
For the 2022 Rajdamnern World Series Super Welterweight (154 lbs) title.
2022-11-18	Win	(Brazil) Luis Cajaiba	Rajadamnern World Series - Semi Final	Bangkok, Thailand	Decision (Unanimous)	3	3:00
2022-10-14	Win	(Thailand) Rungrat Pumphanmuang	Rajadamnern World Series - Group Stage	Bangkok, Thailand	TKO (Knees)	1	
2022-09-09	Loss	(Switzerland) Daniel Rodriguez	Rajadamnern World Series - Group Stage	Bangkok, Thailand	Decision (Split)	3	3:00
2022-08-05	Win	(Australia) Tyler Hardcastle	Rajadamnern World Series - Group Stage	Bangkok, Thailand	KO (Elbow)	1	0:40
2021-12-05	Win	(France) Omar Samb	Muay Thai Grand Prix France	Paris, France	Decision	5	3:00
2021-10-02	Loss	(France) Jimmy Vienot	Empire Fight - Vikings Edition	Montbéliard, France	Decision (Split)	5	3:00
For the vacant WMC World -70kg title.
2021-07-04	Win	(Argentina) Braian Allevato	THAI FIGHT Strong	Pattaya, Thailand	TKO (3 Knockdowns)	1	
2020-02-23	Win	(Thailand) Satanfah Rachanon	Authentic Mix Martial Arts	Phuket, Thailand	KO (Elbow)	2	
Wins the WBC Muay Thai Super Welterweight World title (154 lbs).
2019-07-05	NC	(Russia) Artem Pashporin	Fair Fight IX	Yekaterinburg, Russia	No contest	3	3:00
2019-05-28	Draw	(South Africa) Vuyisile Colossa	MAS Fight	Hong Kong	Draw	1	9:00
2019-03-09	Win	(Spain) Ruiz Renozo	All Star Fight	Thailand	Decision (Unanimous)	3	3:00
2019-01-12	Win	(Russia) Artur Temishev	Emei Legend 36	China	KO (Left High Knee)	1	
2018-12-15	Win	(Russia) Isayants Artur	Emei Legend 35	China	Decision (Unanimous)	3	3:00
2018-10-13	Win	(Cambodia) Long Sevandeun	Topking World Series 23	China	KO (Right Elbow)	2	
2018-07-28	Win	(Greece) Giannis Boukis	Emei Legend 32	Chengdu China	KO (Punches)	2	
2018-06-16	Win	(Netherlands) Georges Solomon	Topking World Series 21	Thailand	KO (Right Elbow)	1	
2018-04-28	Win	(United Kingdom) Daniel Horrobin	Topking World Series 19	Mahasarakham, Thailand	KO	2	
2018-02-10	Win	(Germany) Pascal Schroth	Topking World Series 17, Tournament Final	China	KO (Right Elbows)	2	
Wins the Top King 2017 tournament (154 lbs / 70 kg).
2018-02-10	Win	(Peru) Gabriel Mazzetti	Topking World Series 17, Tournament Semi Finals	China	Decision	3	3:00
2018-01-20	Win	(Belgium) Yassin Baitar	EM Legend 27	China	Decision (Unanimous)	3	3:00
2017-12-02	Win	(Uganda) Umar Semata	EM Legend 26	Leshan, China	TKO	3	
2017-11-18	Win	(Sweden) Patrik Hahn	EM Legend 25	Macau, China	KO (Right Cross)	2	
2017-10-15	Win	(Armenia) Mihran Yenokyan	EM Legend 24	China	TKO		
2017-09-30	Win	(Russia) Khambakhadov Saifullah	Top King World Series 16 Quarter Final	China	TKO (Referee Stoppage/Cut)	1	
2017-08-05	Win	(Russia) Kazbek Kabulov	Top King World Series 15	Su-ngai Kolok, Thailand	TKO	3	
2017-08-05	Win	(Australia) Damon Goodwin	Top King World Series 15	Su-ngai Kolok, Thailand	TKO	1	
2017-07-09	Win	(Sweden) Magnus Andersson	Top King World Series 14 Round of 16	Chongqing, China	KO	1	
2017-06-17	Win	(Germany) Pascal Schroth	EM Legend 20	Emei-Shan, China	Decision	3	3:00
2017-05-27	Win	(Belarus) Dzmitry Filipau	Top King World Series 13	Wuhan, China	KO	1	
2017-03-18	Win	(France) Azize Hlali	La Nuit Des Titans 2017	Tours, France	Decision	5	3:00
2017-01-14	Win	(Russia) Arbi Emiev	Top King World Series 12 Final	Hohhot, China	Decision	3	3:00
Wins the Top King 2016 -70kg tournament
2017-01-14	Win	(Uzbekistan) Ruslan Ataev	Top King World Series 12 Semi Final	Hohhot, China	KO (Right cross)	2	
2016-11-27	Win	(Thailand) Sorgraw Petchyindee	Top King World Series 11 Quarter Final	Nanchang, China	Decision (Unanimous)	3	3:00
2016-08-27	Win	(Belarus) Dmitry Varats	Top King World Series 10	Yantai, China	Decision	3	3:00
2016-07-10	Win	(United Kingdom) Brad Stanton	Top King World Series 9	Luoyang, China	Decision	5	3:00
2016-06-11	Win	(France) Jimmy Vienot	Warriors Night 5	Paris, France	Decision	5	3:00
2016-04-29	Loss	(Thailand) Littewada Sitthikul	Ruamphonkhonpadriew Fights, Lumpini Stadium	Bangkok, Thailand	Decision	5	3:00
For the WMC Super Lightweight (140 lbs) title.
2016-03-29	Win	(Thailand) Manasak Sor.Jor.Lekmuangnon	Lumpini Stadium, Kiatpetch Promotion	Bangkok, Thailand	Decision	5	3:00
2016-03-05	Win	(China) Zhao Yan	Wu Lin Feng World Championship 2016	Zhengzhou, China	Decision	3	3:00
2015-12-13	Win	(France) Bobo Sacko	Best of Siam	Paris, France	Decision	5	3:00
2015-11-10	Loss	(Thailand) Littewada Sitthikul	Petkiatpet Fights, Lumpini Stadium	Bangkok, Thailand	Decision	5	3:00
2015-10-05	Win	(Thailand) Saensatharn P.K. Saenchai Muaythaigym	Rajadamnern Stadium	Bangkok, Thailand	Decision	5	3:00
2015-08-04	Win	(France) Jimmy Vienot	Fight Night Saint-Tropez	Saint Tropez, France	Decision	5	3:00
2015-06-30	Loss	(Thailand) Saensatharn P.K. Saenchai Muaythaigym	Lumpini Stadium	Bangkok, Thailand	Decision	5	3:00
2015-01-26	Win	(Thailand) Singdam Kiatmuu9	Rajadamnern Stadium	Bangkok, Thailand	Decision	5	3:00
2014-12-24	Win	(Thailand) Saensatharn P.K. Saenchai Muaythaigym	Rajadamnern Stadium	Bangkok, Thailand	Decision	5	3:00
2014-10-09	Win	(Thailand) Petchboonchu FA Group	Rajadamnern Stadium	Bangkok, Thailand	Decision	5	3:00
2014-09-10	Win	(Thailand) Petchboonchu FA Group	Rajadamnern Stadium	Bangkok, Thailand	Decision	5	3:00
2014-06-11	Loss	(Thailand) Petchboonchu FA Group	Rajadamnern Stadium	Bangkok, Thailand	Decision	5	3:00
For the Rajadamnern Super Lightweight (140 lbs) title.
2014-05-08	Draw	(Thailand) Petchboonchu FA Group	Rajadamnern Stadium	Bangkok, Thailand	Draw	5	3:00
2014-02-28	Loss	(Thailand) Petchboonchu FA Group	Lumpini Stadium	Bangkok, Thailand	Decision	5	3:00
Loses Thailand Super Lightweight (140 lbs) title.
2014-01-07	Win	(Thailand) Chamuaktong Sor.Yupinda	Lumpinee Stadium	Bangkok, Thailand	Decision	5	3:00
Wins the Thailand Super Lightweight (140 lbs) title.
2013-09-06	Win	(Thailand) Wanchalerm Aooddonmuang	Lumpinee Stadium	Bangkok, Thailand	Decision	5	3:00
2013-08-08	Win	(Thailand) Singdam Kiatmoo9	Rajadamnern Stadium	Bangkok, Thailand	Decision	5	3:00
2013-07-16	Win	(Thailand) Wanchalerm Aooddonmuang	Lumpinee Stadium	Bangkok, Thailand	Decision	5	3:00
2013-05-10	Win	(Thailand) Saenchai PKSaenchaimuaythaigym	Lumpinee Stadium	Bangkok, Thailand	Decision	5	3:00
2013-04-09	Win	(Thailand) Petchboonchu FA Group	Lumpinee Stadium	Bangkok, Thailand	Decision	5	3:00
Wins the Thailand Lightweight (135 lbs) title.
2013-02-07	Win	(Thailand) Singdam Kiatmuu9	Lumpinee Stadium	Bangkok, Thailand	Decision	5	3:00
2013-01-04	Win	(Thailand) Petchboonchu FA Group	Lumpinee Stadium	Bangkok, Thailand	Decision	5	3:00
2012-12-07	Win	(Thailand) Nong-O Kaiyanghadaogym	Lumpinee Stadium	Bangkok, Thailand	Decision	5	3:00
2012-11-09	Win	(Thailand) Kongsak Sitboonmee	Lumpinee Stadium	Bangkok, Thailand	Decision	5	3:00
Wins the Lumpinee Super Featherweight (130 lbs) title.
2012-10-11	Loss	(Thailand) Kongsak Sitboonmee	Rajadamnern Stadium	Bangkok, Thailand	Decision	5	3:00
2012-09-12	Draw	(Thailand) Pakon Sakyothin	Rajadamnern Stadium	Bangkok, Thailand	Draw	5	3:00
2012-07-24	Win	(Thailand) Senkeng Jor.Noparath	Lumpinee Stadium	Bangkok, Thailand	Decision	5	3:00
2012-06-26	Draw	(Thailand) Singtongnoi Por.Telakun	Lumpinee Stadium	Bangkok, Thailand	Draw	5	3:00
2012-05-17	Loss	(Thailand) Saeksan Or. Kwanmuang	Sor.Sommai Fight, Rajadamnern Stadium	Bangkok, Thailand	Decision	5	3:00
2012-02-28	Win	(Thailand) Pettawee Sor Kittichai	Lumpinee Stadium	Bangkok, Thailand	Decision	5	3:00
Wins the Omnoi Featherweight (126 lbs) title.
2012-01-26	Win	(Thailand) Luknimit Singklongsi	Rajadamnern Stadium	Bangkok, Thailand	Decision	5	3:00
2011-12-06	Win	(Thailand) Yodtongthai Por.Telakoon	Lumpinee Stadium	Bangkok, Thailand	KO (Elbow)	4	
2011-10-28	Win	(Thailand) Nongbeer Chokngarmwong	Lumpinee Stadium	Bangkok, Thailand	Decision	5	3:00
2011-09-20	Win	(Thailand) Chatchainoi GardenSeaview	Lumpinee Stadium	Bangkok, Thailand	KO (Elbow)	3	
2011-08-30	Win	(Thailand) Ekmongkon Kaiyanghadaogym	Lumpinee Stadium	Bangkok, Thailand	Decision	5	3:00
2011-07-26	Loss	(Thailand) Thongchai Sitsongpeenong	Lumpinee Stadium	Bangkok, Thailand	Decision	5	3:00
2011-07-05	Win	(Thailand) Wanchailek Kiatphukam	Lumpinee Stadium	Bangkok, Thailand	Decision	5	3:00
2011-05-28	Loss	(Thailand) Wanchailek Kiatphukam	Omnoi Stadium	Bangkok, Thailand	Decision	5	3:00
2011-04-08	Win	(Thailand) Orono Sor.Darnchai	Lumpinee Stadium	Bangkok, Thailand	Decision	5	3:00
2011-03-15	Win	(Thailand) Pompean Kiatchongkao	Lumpinee Stadium	Bangkok, Thailand	Decision	5	3:00
2011-01-28	Win	(Thailand) Fonluang Sitboonmee	Lumpinee Stadium	Bangkok, Thailand	Decision	5	3:00
2010-12-24	Win	(Thailand) Fonluang Sitboonmee	Lumpinee Stadium	Bangkok, Thailand	Decision	5	3:00
2010-11-23	Win	(Thailand) Yodkhunpon Sitmonchai	Lumpinee Stadium	Bangkok, Thailand	Decision	5	3:00
2010-09-17	Win	(Thailand) Ponmongkol KT Gym	Lumpinee Stadium	Bangkok, Thailand	Decision	5	3:00
2010-08-24	Win	(Thailand) Thongchai Sitsongpeenong	Lumpinee Stadium	Bangkok, Thailand	Decision	5	3:00
2010-07-21	Loss	(Thailand) Newwangjan Sor.Katika	Rajadamnern Stadium	Bangkok, Thailand	Decision	5	3:00
2010-03-02	Loss	(Thailand) Newwungjan Sor.Katika	Lumpinee Stadium	Bangkok, Thailand	Decision	5	3:00
2010-02-06	Win	(Thailand) Newwungjan Sor.Katika	Omnoi Stadium	Bangkok, Thailand	Decision	5	3:00
2009-10-02	Win	(Thailand) Meknoi Sor.Danchai	Petsupapan (Lumpinee)	Thailand	Decision		
2009-01-06	Loss	(Thailand) Lomnao Sor.Ratanarungrote	Petsupapan Fight (Lumpinee)	Thailand	Decision		
Legend: Win Loss Draw/No contest Notes

Amateur Muay Thai Record
Date	Result	Opponent	Event	Location	Method	Round	Time
2018-05-19	Win	(Belarus) Andrei Kulebin	I.F.M.A. World Muaythai Championships 2018, Finals -71 kg	Cancun, Mexico	Decision	3	3:00
Wins the I.F.M.A. World Muaythai Championships Gold Medal -71 kg.
2018-05-16	Win	(Turkey) Yildirim Oguz	I.F.M.A. World Muaythai Championships 2018, Semi Finals -71 kg	Cancun, Mexico	Decision	3	3:00
2018-05-14	Win	(Ukraine) Oleh Huta	I.F.M.A. World Muaythai Championships 2018, Quarter Finals -71 kg	Cancun, Mexico	Decision	3	3:00
2018-03-13	Win	(Thailand) Superbon Singha Mawynn	Army Games 68	Thailand	Decision	3	3:00
Wins Army Games -71kg Muay Thai tournament
Legend: Win Loss Draw/No contest Notes

== Karate Combat record ==
Res.	Record	Opponent	Method	Event	Date	Round	Time	Location	Notes
Win	1-0	Vahid Nikkah	TKO (punches)	Karate Combat: Kickback 3	November 14, 2024	2	3:00	Bangkok, Thailand	

== See also ==
- List of male kickboxers
- Rajadamnern Stadium
- Lumpinee Boxing Stadium
