= Sittisak Petpayathai =

Muay Thai fighter

- Born: Sittisak Somwang; 2 December 1987 (age 38); Ubon Ratchathani Province, Thailand
- Other names: Sittisak Siangsimewgym (สิทธิศักดิ์ เซ็งซิมอิ๊วยิม); Sittisak Por.Cherdkiat (สิทธิศักดิ์ ป.เชิดเกียรติ)
- Nationality: Thai
- Height: 177 cm (5 ft 10 in)
- Weight: 63 kg (139 lb; 9.9 st)
- Fighting out of: Bangkok, Thailand
- Team: Kiatpetch Gym

Sittisak Petpayathai (สิทธิศักดิ์ เพชรพญาไท) is a Muay Thai fighter.

== Titles and accomplishments ==
- Lumpinee Stadium
  - 2016 Lumpinee Stadium Lightweight (135 lbs) Champion
- Channel 7 Stadium
  - 2002 Channel 7 Boxing Stadium 108 lbs Champion
  - 2006 Channel 7 Boxing Stadium 122 lbs Champion
  - 2010 Channel 7 Boxing Stadium 130 lbs Champion
  - 2019 Channel 7 Boxing Stadium 135 lbs Champion
- Professional Boxing Association of Thailand (PAT)
  - 2011 Thailand 130 lbs Champion
- Omnoi Stadium
  - 2015 Omnoi Boxing Stadium 135 lbs Champion
- World Professional Muaythai Federation
  - 2015 WPMF World 135 lbs Champion
- World Muay Thai Organization
  - 2018 WMO World 140 lbs Champion
- International Federation of Muaythai Associations
  - 2014 I.F.M.A. World Muaythai Championships -67 kg (bronze)

== Fight record ==
Bangkok Stadiums record
78 Wins (3KO's), 35 Losses, 2 Draws
Date	Result	Opponent	Event	Location	Method	Round	Time
2019-12-15	Loss	(Thailand) Teeradet Chor.Hapayak	Channel 7 Boxing Stadium	Bangkok, Thailand	Decision	5	3:00
2019-10-20	Win	(Thailand) Tapaokaew Singmawynn	Channel 7 Boxing Stadium	Bangkok, Thailand	Decision	5	3:00
Defends Channel 7 Boxing Stadium Stadium 135 lbs title.
2019-07-07	Win	(Thailand) Sibsaen Tor.JaroenthongPhuket	Channel 7 Boxing Stadium	Bangkok, Thailand	Decision	5	3:00
Defends Channel 7 Boxing Stadium 135 lbs title.
2019-04-14	Loss	(Thailand) Sibsaen Tor.JaroenthongPhuket	Channel 7 Boxing Stadium	Bangkok, Thailand	Decision	5	3:00
2019-02-10	Win	(Thailand) Mahadej P.K.SaenchaiMuayThaiGym	Channel 7 Boxing Stadium	Bangkok, Thailand	Decision	5	3:00
Wins Channel 7 Boxing Stadium 135 lbs title.
2018-12-02	Win	(Thailand) Ferrari Jakrayanmuaythai	Channel 7 Boxing Stadium	Bangkok, Thailand	Decision	5	3:00
2018-10-07	Loss	(Thailand) Mahadej P.K.SaenchaiMuayThaiGym	Channel 7 Boxing Stadium	Bangkok, Thailand	KO (Elbow)		
2018-08-11	Win	(Thailand) Kiatpetch Suanaharnpeekmai	Lumpinee Stadium	Bangkok, Thailand	Decision	5	3:00
2018-07-01	Win	(Thailand) Petchnamek P.K.SaenchaiMuayThaiGym	Channel 7 Boxing Stadium	Bangkok, Thailand	Decision	5	3:00
2018	Win	(Thailand) Rungsangtawan Sit.Or Boonchop		Thailand	Decision	5	3:00
Wins WMO 140 lbs World Super Lightweight title.
2017-01-21	Loss	(Thailand) Chalamthong Sitsanate	Lumpinee Stadium	Bangkok, Thailand	Decision	5	3:00
2016-09-11	Loss	(Thailand) Rambo Pet.Por.Tor.Or	Channel 7 Boxing Stadium	Bangkok, Thailand	Decision	5	3:00
For the vacant Channel 7 Boxing Stadium 135 lbs title.
2016-06-26	Win	(Thailand) Chujaroen Dabransarakarm	Lumpinee Stadium	Bangkok, Thailand	Decision	5	3:00
2016-06-03	Win	(Thailand) Chujaroen Dabransarakarm	Lumpinee Stadium	Bangkok, Thailand	Decision	5	3:00
Wins the Lumpinee Stadium Lightweight (135 lbs) title.
2016-03-07	Loss	(Thailand) Chujaroen Dabransarakarm	Sermthai Complex	Maha Sarakham Province Thailand	Decision	5	3:00
2016-01-24	Loss	(Thailand) Yodpanomrung Jitmuangnon	Channel 7 Boxing Stadium	Bangkok, Thailand	Decision	5	3:00
For the vacant Channel 7 Boxing Stadium 135 lbs title.
2015-	Win	(Thailand) Jeereethong Seatransferry		Thailand	Decision	5	3:00
Wins WPMF World 135 lbs title.
2015-09-19	Win	(Thailand) Phetmai Phumphanmuang	Channel 7 Boxing Stadium	Bangkok, Thailand	Decision	5	3:00
Wins Omnoi Stadium 135 lbs title.
2015-07-28	Loss	(Canada) Matt Embree	Topking World Series 4	Hong Kong, China	KO (punches)	1	
2015-05-31	Loss	(Thailand) Chujaroen Dabransarakarm	Channel 7 Boxing Stadium	Bangkok, Thailand	Decision	5	3:00
2014-10-02	Loss	(Thailand) Panpet Kiatjaroenchai		Bangkok, Thailand	Decision	5	3:00
2014-09-05	Win	(Thailand) Denpanom Rongriankilarkorat	Lumpinee Stadium	Bangkok, Thailand	Decision	5	3:00
2014-04-08	Loss	(Thailand) Yodpanomrung Jitmuangnon	Lumpinee Stadium	Bangkok, Thailand	KO	5	
2014-02-11	Loss	(Thailand) Panpetch Kiatjarernchai		Bangkok, Thailand	Decision	5	3:00
2012-10-04	Loss	(Thailand) Thongchai Sitsongpeenong	Rajadamnern Stadium	Bangkok, Thailand	TKO (Knees)	4	
2012-07-31	Win	(Thailand) Arunchai Kiatpataraphan	Lumpinee Stadium	Bangkok, Thailand	Decision	5	3:00
2012-	Win	(Thailand) Kongbeng Kor Romsrithong	Channel 7 Boxing Stadium	Bangkok, Thailand	Decision	5	3:00
Wins Channel 7 Boxing Stadium 130 lbs title.
2012-03-04	Loss	(Thailand) Arunchai Kiatpataraphan	Channel 7 Boxing Stadium	Bangkok, Thailand	Decision	5	3:00
2012-01-13	Loss	(Thailand) Nopakrit Kor.Kumpanart	Lumpinee Stadium	Bangkok, Thailand	KO (Uppercut)	4	
2011-	Loss	(Thailand) Penake Sitnumnoi		Songkhla province, Thailand	TKO	3	
2011-10-09	Loss	(Thailand) Penake Sitnumnoi	Channel 7 Boxing Stadium	Bangkok, Thailand	Decision	5	3:00
Lost Channel 7 Boxing Stadium 130 lbs title.
2010-09-06	Loss	(Thailand) Nong-O Gaiyanghadao	Kriangkrai Kiatpetch, Lumpinee Stadium	Bangkok, Thailand	KO	4	1:42
2011-07-07	Loss	(Thailand) Singdam Kiatmuu9	Rajadamnern Stadium	Bangkok, Thailand	Decision	5	3:00
2011-06-10	Win	(Thailand) Panphet Kiatjaroenchai	Rajadamnern Stadium	Bangkok, Thailand	Decision	5	3:00
Wins the Thailand 130lbs title.
2011-05-10	Loss	(Thailand) Panphet Kiatjaroenchai	Rajadamnern Stadium	Bangkok, Thailand	Decision	5	3:00
2011-02-15	Loss	(Thailand) Singdam Kiatmuu9	Lumpinee Stadium	Bangkok, Thailand	Decision	5	3:00
2011-01-25	Loss	(Thailand) Penake Sitnumnoi	Lumpinee Stadium	Bangkok, Thailand	Decision	5	3:00
2010-10-23	Loss	(Thailand) Penake Sitnumnoi	Bangla Stadium	Phuket, Thailand	Decision	5	3:00
2010-08-04	Win	(Thailand) Manasak Sitniwat	Rajadamnern Stadium	Bangkok, Thailand	KO	4	
2010-04-27	Loss	(Thailand) Penek Sitnumnoi	Lumpinee Stadium	Bangkok, Thailand	Decision	5	3:00
2010-02-07	Win	(Thailand) Chamuaktong Fightermuaythai	Channel 7 Boxing Stadium	Bangkok, Thailand	Decision	5	3:00
Wins the Channel 7 Boxing Stadium 130lbs title.
2009-12-23	Loss	(Thailand) Jomthong Chuwattana	Suek Sor. Sommai, Rajadamnern Stadium	Bangkok, Thailand	KO (Left Uppercut)	2	
2009-10-01	Loss	(Thailand) Jomthong Chuwattana	Suek Daorungchujaroen, Rajadamnern Stadium	Bangkok, Thailand	Decision	5	3:00
For the Rajadamnern Stadium Featherweight title.
2009-08-06	Win	(Thailand) Singtongnoi Por.Telakun	Rajadamnern vs Lumpinee Rajadamnern Stadium	Bangkok, Thailand	Decision	5	3:00
2009-04-05	Win	(Thailand) Jenrobsak Sakhomsin	Channel 7 Boxing Stadium	Bangkok, Thailand	Decision	5	3:00
2008-11-23	Draw	(Thailand) Singtongnoi Por.Telakun	Channel 7 Boxing Stadium	Bangkok, Thailand	Decision	5	3:00
2008-08-24	Win	(Thailand) Punyai Payapkumpan	Channel 7 Boxing Stadium	Bangkok, Thailand	Decision	5	3:00
2006-08-20	Win	(Thailand) Sakunpetchlek Por Sakulpetch	Channel 7 Boxing Stadium	Bangkok, Thailand	Decision	5	3:00
Wins the Channel 7 Boxing Stadium 122lbs title.
2002-11-16	Win	(Thailand) Lomsuphaphan Pet Pet	Channel 7 Boxing Stadium	Bangkok, Thailand	Decision	5	3:00
Wins the Channel 7 Boxing Stadium 108lbs title.
Legend: Win Loss Draw/No contest Notes

Amateur Muay Thai record
Date	Result	Opponent	Event	Location	Method	Round	Time
2014-05-	Loss	(Belarus) Andrei Kulebin	I.F.M.A. World Muaythai Championships 2014, Semi Finals -67 kg	Langkawi, Malaysia			
Wins the 2014 I.F.M.A. World Championships -67kg Bronze Medal.
2014-05-	Win	(Ukraine) Sergey Kulyaba	I.F.M.A. World Muaythai Championships 2014, Quarter Finals -67 kg	Langkawi, Malaysia			
Legend: Win Loss Draw/No contest Notes
