= Nong-O Hama =

Thai professional Muay Thai fighter (born 1986)

Nong-O Hamamuaythai
- Born: Apichet Kotanon; November 10, 1986 (age 40); Sakon Nakhon, Thailand
- Native name: น้องโอ๋ ฮาม่ามวยไทย
- Other names: Nong-O Sit. Or; Nong-O Gaiyanghadaogym; Nong-O Kor.Kiattinan (น้องโอ๋ ก.เกียรตินันท์)
- Height: 171 cm (5 ft 7 in)
- Division: Bantamweight; Super Bantamweight; Featherweight; Super Featherweight; Lightweight
- Reach: 172 cm (68 in)
- Style: Muay Thai (Muay Femur)
- Stance: Orthodox
- Fighting out of: Bangkok, Thailand
- Team: Sit. Or Gym (–2011); Petchyindee Academy (2011–2015); Evolve MMA (2015–2022); Hama Muaythai (2022–present); Superbon Training Camp (2023–present)
- Years active: c. 1996–present

Kickboxing record
- Total: 338
- Wins: 269
- Losses: 59
- Draws: 10

Other information
- Occupation: Muay Thai fighter

Apichet Kotanon (Thai: อภิเชษฐ์ โคตานน; born November 10, 1986), known professionally as Nong-O Hamamuaythai (Thai: น้องโอ๋ ฮาม่ามวยไทย) and previously Nong-O Gaiyanghadao (น้องโอ๋ ไก่ย่างห้าดาว), is a Thai professional Muay Thai fighter currently signed to ONE Championship. He is a four-time Lumpinee Stadium champion, a one-time Rajadamnern Stadium champion, and the inaugural ONE Bantamweight Muay Thai World Champion across three divisions. As of September 22, 2026, Nong-O is ranked #3 in the ONE Flyweight Muay Thai rankings.

After taking a hiatus from Muay Thai in 2015, he became a Muay Thai instructor at Evolve MMA in Singapore until he left the gym in September 2022. He would then make his comeback at ONE Championship: Heroes of Honor on April 20, 2018.

== Biography ==
=== Early career ===
Nong-O Sit Or (น้องโอ๋ ศิษย์ อ.) was born as Apichet Khotanan in Sakon Nakhon Province in the Northeastern (Isan) region of Thailand. He had his first Muay Thai fight at the age of 9. He became interested in Muay Thai when he saw one of his neighbors training. Nong-O was invited to train, and after a month of training he had his first fight.

=== 2008 ===
On August 3, 2008, Nong-O fought against Kōji Okuyama at Keio Plaza hotel in Hachiōji, Tokyo, and he won by KO with a left elbow strike during 3rd round. December 9, 2008, he fought against Wutidet Lukprabath at Lumpinee Stadium in the memorial event of Lumpinee Stadium establishment. He won by decision after five rounds.

=== 2009 ===
On January 18, 2009, Nong-O fought against Tomoaki Suehiro at Yoyogi National Gymnasium for the Muay Thai event Muay Lok. He won by TKO when the referee stopped the contest after he knocked Suehiro down twice with a right hook and left hook during first round. After the contest, he was given a bunch of flowers by Shinya Aoki. Nong-O was going to fight against Shunta Itō in the beginning, but he was replaced because his legs had not healed enough.

On November 8, 2009, he fought against Trijak Sitjomtrai in Japan, winning by majority decision (2-0) after five rounds. Trijak was at the time champion at featherweight sanctioned by the Professional Boxing Association of Thailand.

On December 8, Nong-O fought against Petboonchu F.A. Group for his Lumpinee Stadium title at Super featherweight (130 lbs). Nong-O won by decision and became the new champion.

=== 2010 ===
On January 17, 2010, Nong-O participated in the tournament Yod Muay Champions Cup 60kg in Japan. He fought against Singdam Kiatmoo9 in the first match. After five rounds, the bout was declared a draw. Nong-O lost by the split decision after extra round (6th round). On December 9, he challenged Saenchai's titles of Lumpinee Stadium and WMC, but he lost by decision.

=== 2011 ===
On January 19, 2011, Nong-O Sit Or was named 2010 Boxer of the Year at the Society of Friends of Sportswriters Awards Night in Bangkok.

=== 2012 ===
Nong-O started the year with a win over Singdam in February, and followed it the next month with another win over F16 Rajanon. He then lost a very close fight to Singdam in May, which many thought Nong-O had done enough to win, but beat Petboonchu FA Group in June. On 31 July he fought Singdam in the main event at Lumpinee Stadium and was defeated by unanimous decision.

He faced Petboonchu F.A. Group for the seventh time on October 12, 2012 at Rajadamnern Stadium.

He TKO'd Mongkolchai Phetsupaphan in five on February 7, 2013.

He beat Singdam Kiatmuu9 on points to win the Lumpinee lightweight belt on June 7, 2013.

=== Return after hiatus to ONE Championship ===
==== 2018 ====
Following a competitive hiatus in which he moved to Singapore to coach at Evolve, Nong-O returned in 2018 when ONE Championship unveiled their new striking format: the ONE Super Series. Nong-O debuted on April 20 at ONE Championship: Heroes of Honor and defeated Fabio Pinca via unanimous decision. He returned to his Thai homeland in October at ONE Championship: Kingdom of Heroes, and defeated Mehdi Zatout via unanimous decision.

==== 2019: ONE Muay Thai Bantamweight World Champion ====
On February 16, 2019, Nong-O defeated Han Zihao by unanimous decision to become the inaugural ONE Bantamweight Muay Thai World Champion at ONE Championship: Clash of Legends in Bangkok.

On May 10, 2019, he would defend his ONE Bantamweight Muay Thai World Championship against Hiroaki Suzuki at ONE Championship: Warriors of Light, winning by unanimous decision and retaining his title.

He made his second title defense against Brice Delval at ONE Championship: Immortal Triumph in Ho Chi Minh City on September 6, 2019, featuring ONE Championship's first event in Vietnam and first all-striking card, where he successfully retained the ONE Bantamweight Muay Thai World Championship via a closely contested split decision win.

Nong-O successfully defended his ONE Bantamweight Muay Thai World Championship against Saemapetch Fairtex, winning by fourth-round knockout in a fight where he knocked down Saemapetch twice in the second round.

==== 2020: Fight with Rodlek ====
After Alaverdi Ramazanov won the ONE Bantamweight Kickboxing World Championship at ONE Championship: Edge Of Greatness, he expressed interest in defending his title against Nong-O. A title fight between the two was scheduled for ONE Championship: Heart of Heroes on March 20, 2020. However, the event was cancelled due to the COVID-19 pandemic.

Instead, Nong-O was scheduled to defend his ONE Bantamweight Muay Thai World Championship against Rodlek P.K. Saenchaimuaythaigym after the latter won the 2020 ONE Bantamweight Muay Thai Tournament at ONE Championship: A New Breed. He was scheduled to defend his title against Rodlek at ONE Championship: Collision Course on December 18, 2020. He successfully defended his title with a third round knockout of Rodlek.

==== 2022 ====
Nong-O made his fifth title defense of the ONE Bantamweight Muay Thai World Championship against Felipe Lobo at ONE: X on March 26, 2022. He won the bout after knocking out Lobo with an uppercut in the third round.

Nong-O defended his ONE Bantamweight Muay Thai World Championship against Liam Harrison at ONE on Prime Video 1 on August 27, 2022. He won the bout in the first round after Harrison was unable to continue due to leg kicks.

==== 2023 ====
Nong-O was scheduled to face former ONE Bantamweight Muay Thai World Champion Alaverdi Ramazanov for his seventh title defense on January 14, 2023, at ONE on Prime Video 6. However, the bout was moved to headline at ONE Friday Fights 1 on January 20. He won the bout via knockout in the third round.

Nong-O faced against former ONE Flyweight Muay Thai World champion Jonathan Haggerty for his eighth title defense on April 22, 2023, at ONE Fight Night 9. He lost the bout via knockout in the first round.

Nong-O faced Nico Carrillo on December 22, 2023, at ONE Friday Fights 46 and was knocked out again in the second round.

==== 2024 ====
Nong-O faced Kulabdam Sor.Jor.Piek-U-Thai at ONE Friday Fights 58 on April 5, 2024, winning the bout via unanimous decision.

Nong-O faced Kiamran Nabati on September 27, 2024, at ONE Friday Fights 81. He lost the fight by unanimous decision.

==== 2025 ====
Moving his flyweight debut, Nong-O faced Kongthoranee Sor.Sommai on February 8, 2025, at ONE Fight Night 28. He lost the fight via split decision.

The rematch between Nong-O and Kongthoranee in a main event is scheduled on May 3, 2025, at ONE Fight Night 31. Nong-O won the fight by unanimous decision.

Nong-O was scheduled to face Rodtang Jitmuangnon at ONE 173 on November 16, 2025, for the ONE Flyweight Muay Thai World Championship. Rodtang fell ill and Nong-O missed weight leading to the cancellation of the bout.

=== 2026 ===
Nong-O was scheduled to face Asadula Imangazaliev on March 20, 2026, for the vacant ONE Flyweight Muay Thai World Championship at ONE Friday Fights 147. He lost the bout via knockout in the second round.

== Titles and accomplishments ==
Muay Thai

- ONE Championship
  - ONE Bantamweight Muay Thai World Championship
    - Seven successful title defenses
  - Performance of the Night (two times) vs. Liam Harrison and Alaverdi Ramazanov
- Rajadamnern Stadium
  - 2014 Rajadamnern Stadium Lightweight (135 lbs) Champion
- Toyota Vigo Marathon
  - 2011 Toyota Vigo Marathon Tournament Super Featherweight (130 lbs) Champion
- Lumpinee Stadium
  - 2013 Lumpinee Stadium Lightweight (135 lbs) Champion
  - 2010 Lumpinee Stadium Fighter of the Year
  - 2009 Lumpinee Stadium Super Featherweight (130 lbs) Champion
    - Three successful title defenses
  - 2007 Lumpinee Stadium Featherweight (126 lbs) Champion
  - 2006 Lumpinee Stadium Super Bantamweight (122 lbs) Champion
  - 2005 Lumpinee Stadium Fighter of the Year
- Professional Boxing Association of Thailand (PAT)
  - 2012 Thailand Lightweight (135 lbs) Champion
  - 2005 Thailand Bantamweight (118 lbs) Champion
- Awards
  - 2010 Sports Authority of Thailand Fighter of the Year
  - 2005 Sports Authority of Thailand Fighter of the Year
  - 2005 Sports Writers Association of Thailand Fighter of the Year

== Muay Thai record ==
Muay Thai record
269 wins, 59 losses, 10 draws
Date	Result	Opponent	Event	Location	Method	Round	Time
2027-		(Japan) Shimon Yoshinari	Lumpinee Stadium	Bangkok, Thailand			
2026 ONE Flyweight Muay Thai World Grand Prix Semifinal.
2026-11-13	Win	(Thailand) Rodtang Jitmuangnon	ONE The Inner Circle 38	Bangkok, Thailand	Decision (unanimous)	3	3:00
2026 ONE Flyweight Muay Thai World Grand Prix Quarterfinal.
2026-06-26	Win	(Thailand) Kongthoranee Sor.Sommai	ONE The Inner Circle 22, Lumpinee Stadium	Bangkok, Thailand	Decision (unanimous)	3	3:00
2026-03-20	Loss	(Russia) Asadula Imangazaliev	ONE Friday Fights 147	Bangkok, Thailand	KO (left hook)	2	0:44
For the vacant ONE Flyweight Muay Thai World Championship. Imangazaliev missed weight (139.8 lb), only Nong-O was eligible to win the title
2025-05-03	Win	(Thailand) Kongthoranee Sor.Sommai	ONE Fight Night 31	Bangkok, Thailand	Decision (unanimous)	3	3:00
2025-02-28	Loss	(Thailand) Kongthoranee Sor.Sommai	ONE Fight Night 28	Bangkok, Thailand	Decision (split)	3	3:00
2024-09-27	Loss	(Russia) Kiamran Nabati	ONE Friday Fights 81, Lumpinee Stadium	Bangkok, Thailand	Decision (unanimous)	3	3:00
2024-04-05	Win	(Thailand) Kulabdam Sor.Jor.Piek-U-Thai	ONE Friday Fights 58, Lumpinee Stadium	Bangkok, Thailand	Decision (unanimous)	3	3:00
2023-12-22	Loss	(Scotland) Nico Carrillo	ONE Friday Fights 46, Lumpinee Stadium	Bangkok, Thailand	KO (elbow)	2	1:28
2023-04-22	Loss	(England) Jonathan Haggerty	ONE Fight Night 9	Bangkok, Thailand	KO (punches)	1	2:40
Loses the ONE Bantamweight Muay Thai World Championship.
2023-01-20	Win	(Russia) Alaverdi Ramazanov	ONE Friday Fights 1, Lumpinee Stadium	Bangkok, Thailand	KO (body punch)	3	2:12
Defended the ONE Bantamweight Muay Thai World Championship.
2022-08-27	Win	(England) Liam Harrison	ONE on Prime Video 1	Kallang, Singapore	KO (leg kick)	1	2:10
Defended the ONE Bantamweight Muay Thai World Championship.
2022-03-25	Win	(Brazil) Felipe Lobo	ONE: X	Kallang, Singapore	KO (right uppercut)	3	2:15
Defended the ONE Bantamweight Muay Thai World Championship.
2020-12-18	Win	(Thailand) Rodlek P.K. Saenchaimuaythaigym	ONE Championship: Collision Course	Kallang, Singapore	KO (right cross)	3	1:12
Defended the ONE Bantamweight Muay Thai World Championship.
2019-11-22	Win	(Thailand) Saemapetch Fairtex	ONE Championship: Edge Of Greatness	Kallang, Singapore	KO (right cross)	4	1:46
Defended the ONE Bantamweight Muay Thai World Championship.
2019-09-06	Win	(France) Brice Delval	ONE Championship: Immortal Triumph	Ho Chi Minh City, Vietnam	Decision (split)	5	3:00
Defended the ONE Bantamweight Muay Thai World Championship.
2019-05-10	Win	(Japan) Hiroaki Suzuki	ONE Championship: Warriors of Light	Bangkok, Thailand	Decision (unanimous)	5	3:00
Defended the ONE Bantamweight Muay Thai World Championship.
2019-02-16	Win	(China) Han Zihao	ONE Championship: Clash of Legends	Bangkok, Thailand	Decision (unanimous)	5	3:00
Wins the inaugural ONE Bantamweight Muay Thai World Championship.
2018-10-06	Win	(France) Mehdi Zatout	ONE Championship: Kingdom of Heroes	Bangkok, Thailand	Decision (unanimous)	3	3:00
2018-04-20	Win	(France) Fabio Pinca	ONE Championship: Heroes of Honor	Pasay, Philippines	Decision (unanimous)	3	3:00
2015-04-02	Loss	(Thailand) Chamuaktong Sor.Yupinda	Rajadamnern Stadium	Bangkok, Thailand	Decision	5	3:00
2014-11-25	Win	(Thailand) Kiatpetch Suanaharnpikmai	Lumpinee Stadium	Bangkok, Thailand	KO (uppercut)	3	
2014-10-31	Win	(Thailand) Petchboonchu FA Group	Toyota Marathon	Thailand	Decision	3	3:00
Wins the Toyota Marathon Tournament.
2014-10-31	Win	(Japan) Shota Sato	Toyota Marathon	Thailand	Decision	3	3:00
2014-09-26	Win	(Thailand) Detnarong Wor Suntaranon	Toyota Marathon	Thailand	KO (body kick)	1	
Wins the Toyota Marathon Tournament
2014-09-26	Win	(Republic of Ireland) Stephen Hodgers	Toyota Marathon	Thailand	TKO (body kick)	1	
2014-09-26	Win	(Kenya) Leonard Nganga	Toyota Marathon	Thailand	KO (body punch)	3	
2014-09-10	Win	(Thailand) Chamuaktong Sor.Yupinda	Rajadamnern Stadium	Bangkok, Thailand	Decision	5	3:00
2014-08-14	Win	(Thailand) Pakorn PKSaenchaimuaythaigym	Rajadamnern Stadium	Bangkok, Thailand	Decision	5	3:00
2014-07-16	Loss	(Thailand) Pakorn PKSaenchaimuaythaigym	Rajadamnern Stadium	Bangkok, Thailand	Decision	5	3:00
2014-05-08	Win	(Thailand) Singdam Kiatmuu9	Rajadamnern Stadium	Bangkok, Thailand	Decision	5	3:00
Wins the vacant Rajadamnern Stadium Lightweight (135 lbs) title.
2014-02-28	Loss	(Thailand) Saenchai PK. Saenchaimuaythaigym	Grand Opening of New Lumpinee Stadium	Bangkok, Thailand	Decision	5	3:00
2014-01-21	Win	(Thailand) Petpanomrung Kiatmuu9	Lumpinee Stadium	Bangkok, Thailand	Decision	5	3:00
2013-12-03	Loss	(Thailand) Chamuaktong Sor.Yupinda	Lumpinee Stadium	Bangkok, Thailand	Decision	5	3:00
For the Lumpinee Stadium Lightweight (135 lbs) title.
2013-10-31	Win	(Iran) Hamsa Rahmani	Toyota Marathon	Thailand	KO	2	
2013-10-11	Loss	(Thailand) Chamuaktong Sor.Yupinda	Lumpinee Stadium	Bangkok, Thailand	Decision	5	3:00
2013-09-11	Draw	(Thailand) Pakorn PKSaenchaimuaythaigym	Rajadamnern Stadium	Bangkok, Thailand	Decision	5	3:00
2013-07-12	Loss	(Thailand) Singdam Kiatmuu9	Lumpinee Stadium	Bangkok, Thailand	Decision	5	3:00
2013-06-07	Win	(Thailand) Singdam Kiatmuu9	Lumpinee Stadium	Bangkok, Thailand	Decision	5	3:00
Wins the Lumpinee Stadium Lightweight (135 lbs) title.
2013-05-03	Draw	(Thailand) Pakorn Sakyothin	Lumpinee Stadium	Bangkok, Thailand	Decision	5	3:00
2013-04-09	Win	(Thailand) Kongsak Saenchaimuaythaigym	Petchyindee Fight, Lumpinee Stadium	Bangkok, Thailand	Decision	5	3:00
2013-02-07	Win	(Thailand) Mongkolchai Kwaitonggym	Rajadamnern Stadium	Bangkok, Thailand	TKO	5	
2012-12-07	Loss	(Thailand) Yodwicha Por Boonsit	Lumpinee Stadium	Bangkok, Thailand	Decision	5	3:00
2012-11-02	Win	(Thailand) Thongchai Sitsongpeenong	Petchyindee Fight, Lumpinee Stadium	Bangkok, Thailand	Decision	5	3:00
2012-10-04	Loss	(Thailand) Petchboonchu FA Group	Rajadamnern Stadium Wanmitchai Fight	Bangkok, Thailand	Decision	5	3:00
2012-07-31	Loss	(Thailand) Singdam Kiatmuu9	Lumpinee Stadium	Bangkok, Thailand	Decision	5	3:00
2012-06-08	Win	(Thailand) Petchboonchu FA Group	Lumpinee Champion Krikkrai Fight	Bangkok, Thailand	Decision	5	3:00
Wins the Thailand Lightweight (135 lbs) title.
2012-05-04	Loss	(Thailand) Singdam Kiatmuu9	Ruamnamjai (Special) Fight, Lumpinee Stadium	Bangkok, Thailand	Decision	5	3:00
2012-03-12	Win	(Thailand) F-16 Rachanon	Rajadamnern Stadium	Bangkok, Thailand	Decision	5	3:00
2012-02-03	Win	(Thailand) Singdam Kiatmuu9	Lumpinee Stadium	Bangkok, Thailand	Decision	5	3:00
2011--	Win	(Thailand) Singdam Kiatmuu9	Southern Thailand	Koh Samui, Thailand	Decision	5	3:00
2011-10-07	Loss	(Thailand) F-16 Rachanon	Lumpinee Stadium	Bangkok, Thailand	Decision	5	3:00
2011-09-06	Win	(Thailand) Sittisak Petpayathai	Kriangkrai Kiatpetch, Lumpinee Stadium	Bangkok, Thailand	KO	4	1:42
2011-08-04	Win	(Thailand) Traijak Sitjomtrai	Toyota Vigo Marathon, Channel 7 Stadium	Bangkok, Thailand	Decision	3	3:00
Wins the Toyota Vigo Marathon Super Featherweight (130 lbs) Tournament.
2011-08-04	Win	(Thailand) Panphet Chor Na Pattalung	Toyota Vigo Marathon, Channel 7 Stadium	Bangkok, Thailand	Decision	3	3:00
2011-08-04	Win	(Thailand) Mongkolchai Kwaitonggym	Toyota Vigo Marathon, Channel 7 Stadium	Bangkok, Thailand	Decision	3	3:00
2011-07-07	Loss	(Thailand) F-16 Rachanon	Rajadamnern Stadium	Bangkok, Thailand	Decision	5	3:00
2011-06-10	Loss	(Thailand) Kongsak Saenchaimuaythaigym	Lumpinee Champion Krikkrai	Bangkok, Thailand	Decision	5	3:00
Loses the Lumpinee Stadium Super Featherweight (130 lbs) title.
2011-05-05	Loss	(Thailand) Jomthong Chuwattana	Daorungchujaroen, Rajadamnern Stadium	Bangkok, Thailand	Decision	5	3:00
2011-03-31	Loss	(Thailand) Jomthong Chuwattana	Rajadamnern - Lumpinee For Tsunami Japan	Bangkok, Thailand	Decision	5	3:00
2011-01-25	Loss	(Thailand) Sagetdao Petpayathai	Kiatphet, Lumpinee Stadium	Bangkok, Thailand	Decision	5	3:00
2010-12-29	Loss	(Thailand) Saenchai Sinbimuaythai	Wanminchai, Rajadamnern Stadium	Bangkok, Thailand	Decision	5	3:00
For the Lumpinee Stadium and WMC World Lightweight (135 lbs) titles.
2010-11-02	Win	(Thailand) Petchboonchu FA Group	Lumpinee-Rajadamnern Special	Bangkok, Thailand	TKO	3	
2010-10-05	Win	(Thailand) Pakorn Sakyothin	Lumpinee Champion Krikkrai	Bangkok, Thailand	Decision	5	3:00
Defends the Lumpinee Stadium Super Featherweight (130 lbs) title.
2010-09-07	Win	(Thailand) Sam-A Kaiyanghadaogym	Petsupapan, Lumpinee Stadium	Bangkok, Thailand	Decision	5	3:00
2010-08-10	Win	(Thailand) Pornsanae Sitmonchai	Petchpiya, Lumpinee Stadium	Bangkok, Thailand	Decision	5	3:00
2010-07-13	Win	(Thailand) Singdam Kiatmuu9	Ruamnamjaiwongkarn Muay, Lumpinee Stadium	Bangkok, Thailand	Decision	5	3:00
Defends the Lumpinee Stadium Super Featherweight (130 lbs) title.
2010-05-05	Loss	(Thailand) Saenchai Sor Kingstar	Wanminchai, Rajadamnern Stadium	Bangkok, Thailand	TKO	3	
2010-04-02	Win	(Thailand) Singdam Kiatmuu9	Wanewerapon, Lumpinee Stadium	Bangkok, Thailand	Decision	5	3:00
2010-03-12	Win	(Thailand) Petchboonchu FA Group	Petchyindee, Lumpinee Stadium	Bangkok, Thailand	TKO	2	
Defends the Lumpinee Stadium Super Featherweight (130 lbs) title.
2010-02-12	Win	(Thailand) Sagetdao Petpayathai	Eminetair, Lumpinee Stadium	Bangkok, Thailand	Decision	5	3:00
2010-01-17	Loss	(Thailand) Singdam Kiatmuu9	Muay 2010 1st Muay Lok Prestage	Kōtō, Tokyo, Japan	Ext.R decision (split)	6	3:00
Nong-O was eliminated in the first match in the tournament of Yod Muay Champions Cup 60kg.
2009-12-08	Win	(Thailand) Petchboonchu FA Group	Lumpinee Birthday Show	Bangkok, Thailand	TKO	1	
Wins the Lumpinee Stadium Super Featherweight (130 lbs) title.
2009-11-08	Win	(Thailand) Trijak Sitjomtrai	M-1: Muay Thai Challenge 2009 Yod Nak Suu vol.4	Kōtō, Tokyo, Japan	Decision	5	3:00
2009-09-29	Loss	(Thailand) Saenchai Sor Kingstar	Wanwerapon, Lumpinee Stadium	Bangkok, Thailand	Decision	5	3:00
2009-09-04	Loss	(Thailand) Petchboonchu FA Group	Muay Thai champions of Lumpinee Champion Krikkrai	Bangkok, Thailand	Decision	5	3:00
For the Lumpinee Stadium Super Featherweight (130 lbs) title.
2009-08-06	Win	(Thailand) Jomthong Chuwattana	Rajadamnern + Lumpinee Super	Bangkok, Thailand	Decision	5	3:00
2009-07-03	Win	(Thailand) Singtongnoi Por.Telakun	Lumpinee vs Rajadamnern Special	Bangkok, Thailand	Decision	5	3:00
2009-05-22	Draw	(Thailand) Singdam Kiatmuu9	Por.Pramuk, Lumpinee Stadium	Bangkok, Thailand	Decision draw	5	3:00
2009-05-01	Win	(Thailand) Petchboonchu FA Group	Petsupapan, Lumpinee Stadium	Bangkok, Thailand	Decision	5	3:00
2009-03-20	Win	(Thailand) Lerdsila Chumpairtour	Petchyindee, Lumpinee Stadium	Bangkok, Thailand	Decision	5	3:00
2009-02-24	Win	(Thailand) Orono Wor Petchpun	Por.Pramuk, Lumpinee Stadium	Bangkok, Thailand	Decision (3-2)	5	3:00
2009-01-18	Win	(Japan) Tomoaki Suehiro	M.I.D. Japan presents "Muay Lok Japan 2009"	Shibuya, Tokyo, Japan	TKO (referee stoppage)	1	0:58
2009-01-06	Loss	(Thailand) Saenchai Sor Kingstar	Suek Petsupapan, Lumpinee Stadium	Bangkok, Thailand	KO	3	
2008-12-09	Win	(Thailand) Wuttidet Lukprabat	Lumpinee Champion Krikkrai Fight	Bangkok, Thailand	Decision	5	3:00
2008-10-13	Draw	(Thailand) Singtongnoi Por.Telakun	Sor Sommay, Rajadamnern Stadium	Bangkok, Thailand	Decision draw	5	3:00
2008-09-04	Loss	(Thailand) Wuttidet Lukprabat	Daorungprabath, Rajadamnern Stadium	Bangkok, Thailand	TKO	4	
2008-08-03	Win	(Japan) Kōji Okuyama	Deek: "Target 1st"	Hachiōji, Tokyo, Japan	KO (left elbow)	3	0:49
2008-07-14	Win	(Thailand) Lohngern Pitakcruchaydan	Sor Sommai, Rajadamnern Stadium	Bangkok, Thailand	Decision	5	3:00
2008-05-30	Loss	(Thailand) Singdam Kiatmuu9	Fairtex, Lumpinee Stadium	Bangkok, Thailand	Decision	5	3:00
2008-04-29	Win	(Thailand) Yodbuangam Lukbanyai	Praianan, Lumpinee Stadium	Bangkok, Thailand	Decision	5	3:00
2008-02-05	Loss	(Thailand) Chalermdet Sor.Tawanrung	Lumpinee champion Krikkrai	Bangkok, Thailand	Decision	5	3:00
Loses the Lumpinee Stadium Featherweight (126 lbs) title.
2007-12-07	Win	(Thailand) Sagetdao Petpayathai	Lumpini champion Krikkrai, Lumpinee Stadium	Bangkok, Thailand	Decision	5	3:00
Wins the Lumpinee Stadium Featherweight (126 lbs) title.
2007-08-24	Win	(Thailand) Anuwat Kaewsamrit	Lumpinee Stadium	Bangkok, Thailand	Decision	5	3:00
2007-06-22	Win	(Thailand) Denkiri Sor.Sommai	Phetsupapan, Lumpinee Stadium	Bangkok, Thailand	TKO	3	
2007-05-23	Draw	(Thailand) Denkiri Sor.Sommai	Sor.Sommai, Rajadamnern Stadium	Bangkok, Thailand	Decision draw	5	3:00
2007-04-23	Win	(Thailand) Karnchai Ch.Sungprapai	Sor.Sommai, Rajadamnern Stadium	Bangkok, Thailand	Decision	5	3:00
2007-03-06	Loss	(Thailand) Chalermdet Sor.Tawanrung	Wanboonya, Lumpinee Stadium	Bangkok, Thailand	TKO	2	
2007-01-30	Loss	(Thailand) Pokaew Fonjangchonburi	Phetyindee, Lumpinee Stadium	Bangkok, Thailand	Decision	5	3:00
2006-11-09	Win	(Thailand) Pokaew Fonjangchonburi	Phetjaopraya, Lumpinee Stadium	Bangkok, Thailand	Decision	5	3:00
2006-10-19	Loss	(Thailand) Pokaew Fonjangchonburi	Phetpiya, Lumpinee Stadium	Bangkok, Thailand	Decision	5	3:00
Loses the Lumpinee Stadium Super Bantamweight (122 lbs) title.
2006-09-15	Loss	(Thailand) Traijak Sitjomtrai	Phetpiya, Lumpinee Stadium	Bangkok, Thailand	Decision	5	3:00
2006-08-18	Loss	(Thailand) Saenchai Sor.Khamsing	Petchyindee, Lumpinee Stadium	Bangkok, Thailand	Decision	5	3:00
2006-07-21	Win	(Thailand) Wuttidet Lukprabat	Wanboonya, Lumpinee Stadium	Bangkok, Thailand	TKO	2	
2006-06-02	Win	(Thailand) Phetmanee Phetsupapan	Lumpinee Champion Krikkrai	Bangkok, Thailand	Decision	5	3:00
2006-05-22	Win	(Thailand) Phetmanee Phetsupapan	Lumpinee Stadium	Bangkok, Thailand	Decision	5	3:00
2006-04-25	Win	(Thailand) Denkiree 13Lianresort	Lumpinee Stadium	Bangkok, Thailand	Decision	5	3:00
Wins the Lumpinee Stadium Super Bantamweight (122 lbs) title.
2006-03-31	Draw	(Thailand) Wuttidet Lukprabat	Lumpinee Stadium	Bangkok, Thailand	Decision	5	3:00
2006-02-24	Loss	(Thailand) Kanchai Chor Sangpraphai	Lumpinee Stadium	Bangkok, Thailand	Decision	5	3:00
2005-12-09	Win	(Thailand) Fameechai F.A. Group	Lumpinee Stadium	Bangkok, Thailand	Decision	5	3:00
Wins the Thailand Bantamweight (118 lbs) title.
2005-11-15	Win	(Thailand) Songkom Sor Yuphinda	Lumpinee Stadium	Bangkok, Thailand	Decision	5	3:00
2005-09-30	Draw	(Thailand) Fameechai F.A. Group	Lumpinee Stadium	Bangkok, Thailand	Decision	5	3:00
2005-08-16	Win	(Thailand) Kompayak Fairtex	Lumpinee Stadium	Bangkok, Thailand	Decision	5	3:00
2005-07-19	Win	(Thailand) Kangwanlek Petchyindee	Lumpinee Stadium	Bangkok, Thailand	Decision	5	3:00
2005-06-11	Win	(Thailand) Daoprasuk Kiatkhumthorn	Lumpinee Stadium	Bangkok, Thailand	Decision	5	3:00
2005-05-11	Win	(Thailand) Saensak Sor.Jareantong	Rajadamnern Stadium	Bangkok, Thailand	Decision	5	3:00
2005-04-07	Win	(Thailand) Sipaenoi Sor.Srisompong	Daorungchujarean, Rajadamnern Stadium	Bangkok, Thailand	Decision	5	3:00
2005-03-12	Win	(Thailand) Denlampao Sor.Pongsit	Muaythai Lumpinee Krikkrai	Bangkok, Thailand	Decision	5	3:00
Legend: Win Loss Draw/no contest Notes

== See also ==
- List of male kickboxers
