= Singdam Kiatmuu9 =

Thai former professional Muay Thai fighter and kickboxer

Singdam Kiaatmuu9
- Born: Uthid Kodprakhon; January 1, 1984 (age 42); Isan, Thailand
- Native name: อุทิศ โกรธประโคน
- Other names: Singdam Punrattana (สิงห์ดำ ปืนรัตนา); Singdam YOKKAOSaenchaiGym
- Nickname: Fierce Tiger of Khmer (เสือร้ายแดนขแมร์)
- Height: 175 cm (5 ft 9 in)
- Division: Super Flyweight; Featherweight; Super Featherweight; Lightweight; Super Lightweight
- Style: Muay Thai (Muay Tae), Kickboxing
- Stance: Orthodox
- Fighting out of: Isan, Thailand
- Team: Kiatmuu9 Gym / YOKKAO

Kickboxing record
- Total: 345
- Wins: 277
- Losses: 66
- Draws: 2

Other information
- Occupation: Muay Thai fighter (retired); Muay Thai trained
- Notable students: Petpanomrung Kiatmuu9, Superlek Kiatmuu9, Manachai

Uthid Kodprakhon (Thai: อุทิศ โกรธประโคน; born January 1, 1984), known professionally as Singdam Kiatmuu9 (Thai: สิงห์ดำ เกียรติหมู่9), is a Thai former professional Muay Thai fighter and kickboxer. He is former four-time Lumpinee Stadium champion across three divisions, as well as the 2002 Sports Writers Association of Thailand Fighter of the Year, who was famous in the 2000s and 2010s. Nicknamed "Fierce Tiger of Khmer", he was especially known for his powerful right kicks and is now often regarded amongst the greatest fighters in the history of Muay Thai.

== Biography ==
=== Early career ===
Singdam is from Buriram in the Northeast part of Thailand. He began fighting at the age of nine and just one year later began training at the Kiatmuu9 gym. He continued to train at Kiatmuu9 gym throughout his career.

=== 2002–2005 ===
In 2002 he beat Orono Wor Petchpun at Lumpinee Boxing Stadium for the title Featherweight champion of Thailand. Shortly after he was awarded with the sports writers of Thailand fighters of the year. In 2004 he beat Yodsanklai Fairtex, then fought Anuwat Kaewsamrit in a fight that would determine who would win the same award, but this time he was KO'd by a punch. Despite the loss he still managed to win Lumpinee fighter of the year. In 2005 he fought Saenchai PKSaenchaimuaythaigym, and won a decision. The two would meet three more times in the ensuing year and Singdam was defeated each time.

=== 2006–2009 ===
In 2006 Singdam continued his rivalry with Orono, with Singdam winning two of the three fights. In 2007 he fought Jomthong Chuwattana at Lumpinee stadium where he won on points. In 2008 he started a new rivalry, this time with Nong-O Sit Or and Singdam would win the first fight between them. In 2009 he fought Lerdsila Chumpairtour and won a decision

=== 2010–present ===
At the beginning of 2010 he fought in Japan against Nong-O Sit Or. After five rounds the bout was ruled a draw, and was extended to a 6th round. After the extension round Singdam was ruled the winner. Singdam and Nong-O fought two more times in 2010, with Nong-O winning both. In 2011 he matched up with Sagetdao Petpayathai twice, and losing both times. At the annual Lumpinee Boxing Stadium birthday show in December Singdam was matched against F16 Rachanon and he won by TKO at the end of round four after F-16 was unable to continue from because of damage caused to his arm. In 2012 Singdam once again fought Nong-O Sit Or to start off the year, and this time he lost. On June 8 Singdam fought Wanchalerm Uddonmuang for the title of Lumpinee Boxing Stadium and won a decision. July 6 he knocked out Watcharachai Rachanon to retain his championship. On September 8, 2012 he defended his Lumpini title by beating Saenchai PKSaenchaimuaythaigym in a high-profile bout that drew significant public attention.

He rematched Saenchai PKSaenchaimuaythaigym on October 4, 2012 at Rajadamnern, and lost by decision.

Singdam lost a decision to Lumpinee 130 lb champion Yodwicha Por Boonsit on February 7, 2013.

He rematched Sagetdao Phetphayathai at Lumpinee on March 8, 2013 and won on points.

He beat Petchboonchu FA Group on points at Lumpinee on May 10, 2013.

He lost to Nong-O Kaiyanghadaogym on points in a Lumpinee lightweight title fight on June 7, 2013. They rematched on July 12, 2013, with Singdam winning on points and reclaiming his belt.

Singdam lost to Yodwicha Por Boonsit on points in a rematch at Rajadamnern on August 8, 2013.

He lost to Saenchai PKSaenchaimuaythaigym by decision at Yokkao 5 in Pattaya, Thailand on November 15, 2013.

YOKKAO Boxing announced on Twitter that Singdam officially changed his fighting name and will fight under his new name, Singdam YOKKAOSaenchaiGym on September 2, 2017. He is currently under YOKKAO management and trains at the YOKKAO Training Center in Bangkok.

On 27 July, Singdam fought Craig Coakley for the WBC Muay Thai Super-lightweight Diamond title at YOKKAO 42 in Dublin, Ireland. He became the third fighter in history to win the WBC Diamond title which has only been held by two fighters so far, namely, Buakaw Banchamek and Saenchai. The win for Singdam was surrounded by speculation as to how the judges scored the bout. Under WBC rules all strikes count the same as opposed to traditional Muay Thai rules where kicks score higher than punches. Coakley took this rule set and capitalised on it by mainly boxing and Singdam relying heavily on his right kick, a frequent component of his fighting style. Many experts and spectators vow that Coakley was the superior fighter on the night and landed a significant number of strikes more than Singdam.

== Titles and accomplishments ==
=== Muay Thai ===
- Lumpinee Stadium
  - 2003 Lumpinee Stadium Fighter of the Year
  - 2004 Lumpinee Stadium Super Featherweight (130 lbs) Champion
  - 2005 Lumpinee Stadium Super Featherweight (130 lbs) Champion
  - 2012 Lumpinee Stadium Lightweight (135 lbs) Champion
    - Two successful title defenses
  - 2013 Lumpinee Stadium Lightweight (135 lbs) Champion
  - 2014 Lumpinee Stadium Super Lightweight (140 lbs) Champion
- Professional Boxing Association of Thailand (PAT)
  - 2002 Thailand Featherweight (126 lbs) Champion
    - Two successful title defenses
  - 2005 Thailand Super Featherweight (130 lbs) Champion
  - 2013 Thailand Lightweight (135 lbs) Champion
- World Boxing Council Muaythai
  - 2019 WBC Muay Thai Diamond World Super Lightweight (140 lbs) Champion
- Toyota Marathon
  - 2001 Toyota Marathon Tournament Super Flyweight (115 lbs) Champion
  - 2014 Toyota Marathon Tournament Super Lightweight (140 lbs) Champion
- Awards
  - 2002 Sports Writers Association of Thailand Fighter of the Year
  - 2003 Sports Authority of Thailand Fighter of the Year
  - 2004 Sports Writers Association of Thailand Fight of the Year (vs. Anuwat Kaewsamrit)

=== Kickboxing ===
- Kunlun Fight
  - 2017 Kunlun Fight 4-Man 66kg tournament Runner-Up

== Fight record ==
Professional Muay Thai and Kickboxing Record
276 Wins, 67 Losses, 2 Draws
Date	Result	Opponent	Event	Location	Method	Round	Time
2022-06-18	Loss	(China) Hu Zheng	Battle Time Championship	China	KO (Right cross)	3	
2020-01-25	Win	(Italy) Christian Zahe	YOKKAO 45	Turin, Italy	Decision	5	3:00
2019-11-30	Win	(Italy) Cristian Faustino	YOKKAO Fight Night	Bologna, Italy	Decision	5	3:00
2019-07-27	Win	(Republic of Ireland) Craig Coakley	YOKKAO 42	Ireland	Decision	5	3:00
Wins the WBC Muay Thai Diamond Super Lightweight (140 lbs) title.
2019-05-25	Win	(Australia) Alexi Petroulias	YOKKAO 39	Australia	Decision	5	3:00
2019-01-26	Win	(France) Jeremy Payet	YOKKAO 35	Italy	TKO (3 Knockdowns)	2	2:58
2018-12-15	Win	(China) Pu Dongdong	Emei Legend 35	China	TKO (Doctor Stop./Arm Injury)	2	3:00
2018-10-29	Win	(Sweden) Mathias Jonsson	YOKKAO 33	Hong Kong	Decision	3	3:00
2018-05-26	Loss	(China) Tie Yinghua	Glory of Heroes 31	Beijing, China	KO (Spinning Hook Kick)	1	
2018-03-10	Win	(United Kingdom) Jack Kennedy	YOKKAO 30	United Kingdom	Decision (Unanimous)	5	3:00
2018-02-03	Win	(China) Xie Lei	Wu Lin Feng 2018: World Championship in Shenzhen	Shenzhen, China	Ext.R Decision (Unanimous)	4	3:00
2017-11-12	Loss	(China) Yang Zhuo	Kunlun Fight 67 - 66kg World Championship, Final	Sanya, China	Decision (Split)	3	3:00
For the 2016 Kunlun Fight 66kg World Tournament title.
2017-11-12	Win	(China) Pan Jiayun	Kunlun Fight 67 - 66kg World Championship, Semi Finals	Sanya, China	Decision (Unanimous)	3	3:00
2017-11-12	Win	(Russia) Takhmasib Kerimov	Kunlun Fight 67 - 66kg World Championship, Quarter Finals	Sanya, China	TKO (arm injury/middle kicks)	3	
2017-09-11	Loss	(Russia) Kazbek Kabulov	Yokkao 25	Hong Kong	KO	1	
2017-08-27	Win	(Belgium) Ali Makhi	Kunlun Fight 65	Qingdao, China	Decision	3	3:00
2017-06-10	Win	(China) Gu Hui	Kunlun Fight 62	Bangkok, Thailand	Decision (Unanimous)	3	3:00
2016-10-21	Win	(China) He Biao	Superstar Fight 6	China	Decision (Unanimous)	3	3:00
2016-09-23	Win	(Thailand) Phosa Nopphorn	Superstar Fight 5	Beijing, China	TKO	3	0:00
Wins the Superstar Fight Lightweight (135 lbs) title.
2016-09-23	Win	(China) Liu Yong	Superstar Fight 5	Beijing, China	Decision (Unanimous)	3	3:00
2016-08-27	Win	(Australia) Jake Moulden	Dynamite Muay Thai	Melbourne, Australia	Decision	5	3:00
2016-07-02	Win	(China) Zhang Shuai	Superstar Fight 4	Shenzhen, China	KO	2	1:32
2016-05-21	Win	(China) Li Chenchen	Superstar Fight 3	Harbin, China	Decision (Unanimous)	3	3:00
2016-04-16	Win	(China) Zheng Ke	Superstar Fight 2	Hunan, China	TKO	2	
2016-02-27	Win	(China) Zhang Chenglong	Superstar Fight 1	China	TKO (broken arm/kick)	1	3:00
2015-12-08	Loss	(Thailand) Chamuakthong Sor.Yupinda	Lumpinee Stadium	Bangkok, Thailand	Decision	5	3:00
For the Lumpinee Stadium Super Lightweight (140 lbs) title.
2015-10-10	Win	(England) Liam Harrison	Yokkao 15	England	Decision	5	3:00
2015-09-09	Loss	(Thailand) Manasak Sor.Jor.Lekmuangnon	Rajadamnern Stadium	Bangkok, Thailand	Decision	5	
2015-06-19	Loss	(France) Azize Hlali	Best of Siam 6	France	Decision	5	3:00
2015-03-06	Loss	(Thailand) Manasak Sor.Jor.Lekmuangnon	Lumpinee Stadium	Bangkok, Thailand	TKO (Punch)	4	
2014-10-31	Loss	(Thailand) Petchboonchu FA Group	Toyota tournament	Thailand	Decision	3	3:00
2014-09-05	Win	(Thailand) Saensatharn P.K. Saenchai Muaythaigym	Lumpinee Stadium	Bangkok, Thailand	Decision	5	3:00
Wins the Lumpinee Stadium Super Lightweight (140 lbs) title.
2014-05-30	Win	(Thailand) Saenchai PKSaenchaimuaythaigym	Toyota Marathon Final	Surat Thani, Thailand	Decision	3	3:00
Wins the Toyota Marathon Super Lightweight (140 lbs) Tournament.
2014-05-30	Win	(Australia) Jayy Tonkin	Toyota Marathon Semi Final	Surat Thani, Thailand	KO (knee to body)	2	
2014-05-30	Win	(France) John Giib	Toyota Marathon Quarter Final	Surat Thani, Thailand	KO (head kick)	1	
2014-05-08	Loss	(Thailand) Nong-O Kaiyanghadaogym	Rajadamnern Stadium	Bangkok, Thailand	Decision	5	3:00
For the vacant Rajadamnern Stadium Lightweight (135 lbs) title.
2014-03-30	Win	(Thailand) Chamuaktong Sor.Yupinda	Charity Event for School	Songkhla, Southern Thailand	Decision	5	3:00
2014-02-28	Loss	(Thailand) Pakorn PKSaenchaimuaythaigym	Grand Opening of New Lumpinee Stadium	Bangkok, Thailand	Decision	3	3:00
For the Lumpinee Stadium Lightweight (135 lbs) title.
2014-01-07	Win	(Thailand) Kongsak sitboonmee	Lumpinee Stadium	Bangkok, Thailand	Decision	5	3:00
2013-11-17	Loss	(Thailand) Saenchai PKSaenchaimuaythaigym	Yokkao 5	Pattaya, Thailand	Decision		
2013-10-11	Loss	(Thailand) Petchboonchu FA Group	Lumpinee Stadium	Bangkok, Thailand	Decision	5	3:00
Loses the Lumpinee Stadium Lightweight (135 lbs) title.
2013-09-04	Win	(Thailand) Chamuaktong Sor.Yupinda	Rajadamnern Stadium	Bangkok, Thailand	Decision	5	3:00
2013-08-08	Loss	(Thailand) Yodwicha Por Boonsit	Rajadamnern Stadium	Bangkok, Thailand	Decision	5	3:00
2013-07-12	Win	(Thailand) Nong-O Kaiyanghadaogym	Lumpinee Stadium	Bangkok, Thailand	Decision	5	3:00
Wins the Lumpinee Stadium Lightweight (135 lbs) title and Thailand Lightweight (135 lbs) title.
2013-06-07	Loss	(Thailand) Nong-O Kaiyanghadaogym	Lumpinee Stadium	Bangkok, Thailand	Decision	5	3:00
Loses the Lumpinee Stadium Lightweight (135 lbs) title.
2013-05-10	Win	(Thailand) Petchboonchu FA Group	Lumpinee Stadium	Bangkok, Thailand	Decision	5	3:00
2013-03-08	Win	(Thailand) Sagetdao Phetphayathai	Lumpinee Stadium	Bangkok, Thailand	Decision	5	3:00
2013-02-07	Loss	(Thailand) Yodwicha Por Boonsit	Rajadamnern Stadium	Bangkok, Thailand	Decision	5	3:00
2013-01-04	Win	(Thailand) Saenchai PKSaenchaimuaythaigym	Lumpinee Stadium	Bangkok, Thailand	Decision	5	3:00
2012-12-07	Win	(Thailand) Wanchalerm Uddonmuang	Lumpinee Stadium	Bangkok, Thailand	Decision	5	3:00
2012-10-04	Loss	(Thailand) Saenchai PKSaenchaimuaythaigym	Rajadamnern Stadium	Bangkok, Thailand	Decision	5	3:00
2012-09-07	Win	(Thailand) Saenchai PKSaenchaimuaythaigym	Lumpinee Stadium	Bangkok, Thailand	Decision	5	3:00
Defends the Lumpinee Stadium Lightweight (135 lbs) title.
2012-07-31	Win	(Thailand) Nong-O Sit Or	Lumpinee Stadium	Bangkok, Thailand	Decision	5	3:00
Defends the Lumpinee Stadium Lightweight (135 lbs) title.
2012-07-06	Win	(Thailand) Watcharachai Rachanon	Lumpinee Stadium	Bangkok, Thailand	KO (knee)	3	
2012-06-08	Win	(Thailand) Wanchalerm Uddonmuang	Lumpinee Stadium	Bangkok, Thailand	Decision	5	3:00
Wins the vacant Lumpinee Stadium Lightweight (135 lbs) title.
2012-05-04	Win	(Thailand) Nong-O Sit Or	Lumpinee Stadium	Bangkok, Thailand	Decision	5	3:00
2012-04-03	Win	(Thailand) Sagetdao Petpayathai	Lumpinee Stadium	Bangkok, Thailand	Decision	5	3:00
2012-03-09	Draw	(Thailand) Wanchalerm Uddonmuang	Lumpinee Stadium	Bangkok, Thailand	Decision	5	3:00
2012-02-03	Loss	(Thailand) Nong-O Sit Or	Lumpinee Stadium	Bangkok, Thailand	Decision	5	3:00
2011-12-09	Win	(Thailand) F-16 Rachanon	Lumpinee Stadium	Bangkok, Thailand	TKO (kicks)	4	3:00
2011--	Loss	(Thailand) Nong-O Sit Or	Southern Thailand	Koh Samui, Thailand	Decision	5	3:00
2011-10-07	Win	(Thailand) Petchboonchu FA Group	Lumpinee Stadium	Bangkok, Thailand	Decision	5	3:00
2011-09-06	Loss	(Thailand) Sagetdao Petpayathai	Lumpinee Stadium	Bangkok, Thailand	Decision	5	3:00
2011-08-02	Loss	(Thailand) Petchboonchu FA Group	Lumpinee Stadium	Bangkok, Thailand	Decision	5	3:00
2011-07-07	Win	(Thailand) Sittisak Petpayathai	Rajadamnern Stadium	Bangkok, Thailand	Decision	5	3:00
2011-06-10	Loss	(Thailand) Petchboonchu FA Group	Lumpinee Stadium	Bangkok, Thailand	Decision	5	3:00
2011-05-05	Win	(Thailand) Sagetdao Petpayathai	Rajadamnern Stadium	Bangkok, Thailand	Decision	5	3:00
2011-03-08	Win	(Thailand) Tukatong Petpaiyathai	Lumpinee Stadium	Bangkok, Thailand	Decision	5	3:00
2011-02-15	Win	(Thailand) Sittisak Petpayathai	Lumpinee Stadium	Bangkok, Thailand	Decision	5	3:00
2010-12-29	Win	(Thailand) Chamuaktong Looklongtun	Rajadamnern Stadium	Bangkok, Thailand	Decision	5	3:00
2010-10-05	Loss	(Thailand) Superbon Lookjaomaesaivaree	Lumpinee Stadium	Bangkok, Thailand	Decision	5	3:00
2010-08-01	Win	(Thailand) Orono Wor Petchpun	Muay Lok 2010 Grand Stage	Tokyo, Japan	Decision (Majority)	5	3:00
2010-07-13	Loss	(Thailand) Nong-O Sit Or	Lumpinee Stadium	Bangkok, Thailand	Decision	5	3:00
2010-04-02	Loss	(Thailand) Nong-O Sit Or	Lumpinee Stadium	Bangkok, Thailand	Decision	5	3:00
2010-03-05	Win	(Thailand) Superball Lookjaomaesaivaree	Lumpinee Stadium	Bangkok, Thailand	Decision	5	3:00
2010-02-09	Loss	(Thailand) Superball Lookjaomaesaivaree	Lumpinee Stadium	Bangkok, Thailand	Decision	5	3:00
2010-01-17	Win	(Thailand) Nong-O Sit Or	Muay 2010 1st Muay Lok Prestage	Kōtō, Tokyo, Japan	Ext.R Decision (Split)	6	3:00
2009-12-19	Win	(Thailand) Lerdsila Chumpairtour	Lumpinee Stadium	Bangkok, Thailand	Decision	5	3:00
2009-10-31	Loss	(Thailand) Panpet Chor Na Pattalung		Nong Khai province, Thailand	Decision	5	3:00
For the Thailand Super Featherweight (130 lbs) title.
2009-09-12	Win	(Thailand) Tuantong Pumphanmuang	Lumpinee Stadium	Bangkok, Thailand	Decision	5	3:00
2009-06-13	Win	(Thailand) Pettanong Petfergus	Lumpinee Stadium	Bangkok, Thailand	Decision	5	3:00
2009-05-22	Draw	(Thailand) Nong-O Sit Or	Lumpinee Stadium	Bangkok, Thailand	Decision	5	3:00
2009-04-25	Win	(Thailand) Kaew Fairtex	Lumpinee Stadium	Bangkok, Thailand	Decision	5	3:00
2008-12-13	Win	(Thailand) Kaew Fairtex	Lumpinee Stadium	Bangkok, Thailand	Decision	5	3:00
2008-10-25	Win	(Thailand) Yodbuangam Lukbanyai	Lumpini Krikkrai, Lumpinee Stadium	Bangkok, Thailand	Decision	5	3:00
2008-10-03	Win	(Thailand) Longern Por Muangthungsong	Lumpinee Stadium	Bangkok, Thailand	Decision	5	3:00
2008-08-16	Win	(Thailand) Chalermdet Sor.Tawanrung	Omnoi Stadium	Samut Sakhon, Thailand	Decision	5	3:00
2008-06-24	Loss	(Thailand) Saenchainoi Pumphanmuang	Lumpinee Stadium	Bangkok, Thailand	Decision	5	3:00
2008-05-30	Win	(Thailand) Nong-O Sit Or	Lumpinee Stadium	Bangkok, Thailand	Decision	5	3:00
2008-04-29	Win	(Thailand) Petchmankong Petfergus	Lumpinee Stadium	Bangkok, Thailand	Decision	5	3:00
2008-03-18	Win	(Thailand) Yodbuangam Lukbanyai	Lumpinee Stadium	Bangkok, Thailand	Decision	5	3:00
2008-02-12	Loss	(Thailand) Duangsompong Kor Sapaotong	Lumpinee Stadium	Bangkok, Thailand	Decision	5	3:00
2007-12-04	Win	(Thailand) Petchmankong Sit Or	Lumpinee Stadium	Bangkok, Thailand	Decision	5	3:00
2007-11-02	Win	(Thailand) Petaskin Sor Trumpet	Lumpinee Stadium	Bangkok, Thailand	Decision	5	3:00
2007-07-03	Loss	(Thailand) Nopparat Keatkhamtorn	Lumpinee Stadium	Bangkok, Thailand	Decision	5	3:00
2007-05-22	Win	(Thailand) Jomthong Chuwattana	Lumpinee Stadium	Bangkok, Thailand	Decision	5	3:00
2007-04-03	Win	(Thailand) Attachai Fairtex	Lumpinee Stadium	Bangkok, Thailand	Decision	5	3:00
2007-02-27	Win	(Thailand) Duangsompong Kor Sapaotong	Lumpinee Stadium	Bangkok, Thailand	Decision	5	3:00
2007-01-12	Win	(Thailand) Duangsompong Kor Sapaotong	Lumpinee Stadium	Bangkok, Thailand	Decision	5	3:00
2006-12-22	Win	(Thailand) Orono Wor Petchpun	Lumpinee Stadium	Bangkok, Thailand	Decision	5	3:00
2006-11-17	Loss	(Thailand) Kongpipop Petchyindee	Gaiyanghadao Tournament, Quarter Final	Nakhon Ratchasima, Thailand	Decision	3	3:00
2006-10-06	Loss	(Thailand) Sagatpetch IngramGym	Lumpinee Stadium	Bangkok, Thailand	Decision	5	3:00
2006-09-01	Loss	(Thailand) Orono Wor Petchpun	Lumpinee Stadium	Bangkok, Thailand	Decision	5	3:00
2006-08-08	Loss	(Thailand) Attachai Fairtex	Fairtex, Lumpinee Stadium	Bangkok, Thailand	Decision	5	3:00
2006-07-14	Loss	(Thailand) Nopparat Keatkhamtorn	Lumpinee Stadium	Bangkok, Thailand	Decision	5	3:00
Fails to capture Lumpinee Stadium Super Featherweight (130 lbs) title and loses Thailand Featherweight (130 lbs) title.
2006-05-05	Win	(Thailand) Orono Wor Petchpun	Lumpinee Stadium	Bangkok, Thailand	Decision	5	3:00
2006-03-24	Loss	(Thailand) Saenchai Sinbimuaythai	Lumpinee Stadium	Bangkok, Thailand	Decision	5	3:00
2006-02-10	Win	(Thailand) Attachai Fairtex	Lumpinee Stadium	Bangkok, Thailand	Decision	5	3:00
2005-12-09	Loss	(Thailand) Saenchai Sinbimuaythai	Lumpinee Stadium	Bangkok, Thailand	Decision	5	3:00
Loses the Lumpinee Stadium Super Featherweight (130 lbs) title.
2005-11-15	Win	(Thailand) Kongpipop Petchyindee	Lumpinee Stadium	Bangkok, Thailand	Decision	5	3:00
2005-10-21	Win	(Thailand) Nopparat Keatkhamtorn	Lumpinee Stadium	Bangkok, Thailand	Decision	5	3:00
2005-09-27	Win	(Thailand) Kaew Fairtex	Lumpinee Stadium	Bangkok, Thailand	Decision	5	3:00
2005-08-31	Loss	(Thailand) Nopparat Keatkhamtorn	Rajadamnern Stadium	Bangkok, Thailand	Decision	5	3:00
2005-07-19	Loss	(Thailand) Saenchai Sinbimuaythai	Lumpinee Stadium	Bangkok, Thailand	Decision	5	3:00
2005-06-10	Win	(Thailand) Saenchai Sinbimuaythai	Lumpinee Stadium	Bangkok, Thailand	Decision	5	3:00
2005-05-06	Win	(Thailand) Orono Wor Petchpun	Lumpinee Stadium	Bangkok, Thailand	Decision	5	3:00
Wins the vacant Lumpinee Stadium Super Featherweight (130 lbs) title and Thailand Super Featherweight (130 lbs) title.
2005-03-18	Loss	(Thailand) Sagatpetch Sor.Sakulpan	Lumpinee Stadium	Bangkok, Thailand	Decision	5	3:00
Loses the Lumpinee Stadium Super Featherweight (130 lbs) title.
2005-02-11	Loss	(Thailand) Sibmean Lemtongkornpat	Lumpinee Stadium	Bangkok, Thailand	Decision	5	3:00
2005-01-04	Win	(Thailand) Nopparat Keatkhamtorn	Lumpinee Stadium	Bangkok, Thailand	Decision	5	3:00
2004-12-07	Win	(Thailand) Sibmean Lemtongkornpat	Lumpinee Stadium	Bangkok, Thailand	Decision	5	3:00
Wins the Lumpinee Stadium Super Featherweight (130 lbs) title.
2004-10-08	Win	(Thailand) Sagatpetch Sor.Sakulpan	Lumpinee Stadium	Bangkok, Thailand	Decision	5	3:00
2004-09-14	Loss	(Thailand) Orono Wor Petchpun	Lumpinee Stadium	Bangkok, Thailand	Decision	5	3:00
2004-08-10	Loss	(Thailand) Orono Wor Petchpun	Lumpinee Stadium	Bangkok, Thailand	Decision	5	3:00
2004-05-04	Loss	(Thailand) Anuwat Kaewsamrit	Lumpinee Stadium	Bangkok, Thailand	TKO	3	
2004-04-02	Win	(Thailand) Yodsanklai Fairtex	Lumpinee Stadium	Bangkok, Thailand	Decision	5	3:00
2004-01-24	Win	(Thailand) Kongpipop Petchyindee	Lumpinee Stadium	Bangkok, Thailand	Decision	5	3:00
Defends the Thailand Featherweight (126 lbs) title.
2003-12-09	Win	(Thailand) Samkor Kiatmontep	Lumpinee Stadium	Bangkok, Thailand	Decision	5	3:00
2003-11-14	Win	(Thailand) Samkor Kiatmontep	Lumpinee Stadium	Bangkok, Thailand	Decision	5	3:00
2003-10-10	Win	(Thailand) Nongbee Kiatyongyut	Lumpinee Stadium	Bangkok, Thailand	Decision	5	3:00
2003-08-22	Win	(Thailand) Orono MajesticGym	Lumpinee Stadium	Bangkok, Thailand	Decision	5	3:00
Defends the Thailand Featherweight (126 lbs) title.
2003-07-29	Win	(Thailand) Kongpipop Petchyindee	Lumpinee Stadium	Bangkok, Thailand	Decision	5	3:00
2003-06-23	Win	(Thailand) Klairung Sor.SasipaGym	OneSongchai + Petchthongdam, Rajadamnern Stadium	Bangkok, Thailand	Decision	5	3:00
2003-06-07	Win	(Thailand) Chalarmkao Rachanon	Wansongpon, Lumpinee Stadium	Bangkok, Thailand	Decision	5	3:00
2003-03-26	Win	(Thailand) Orono MajesticGym	Petchyindee, Lumpinee Stadium	Bangkok, Thailand	Decision	5	3:00
2002-12-20	Win	(Thailand) Petchdam Kiatpraphat	Lumpinee Stadium	Bangkok, Thailand	Decision	5	3:00
2002-11-29	Draw	(Thailand) Ngathao Attharungroj	Lumpinee Stadium	Bangkok, Thailand	Decision	5	3:00
2002-	Win	(Thailand) Orono MajesticGym		Bangkok, Thailand	Decision	5	3:00
Wins the Thailand Featherweight (126 lbs) title.
2002-09-27	Win	(Thailand) Petchmanee Petsupapan	Lumpinee Stadium	Bangkok, Thailand	Decision	5	3:00
2002-08-13	Win	(Thailand) Phutawan BuriramPhukhaofai	Lumpinee Stadium	Bangkok, Thailand	Decision	5	3:00
2002-06-21	Win	(Thailand) Sakniran Tor.Sittichai	Lumpinee Stadium	Bangkok, Thailand	Decision	5	3:00
2002-03-11		(Thailand) Lerdsila Chumpairtour	Rajadamnern Stadium	Bangkok, Thailand			
2001-12-25	Loss	(Thailand) Lomchoi Chor.Parama6	Rajadamnern Stadium	Bangkok, Thailand	Decision	5	3:00
2001-10-29	Win	(Thailand) Kangwanlek Petchyindee	Lumpinee Stadium	Bangkok, Thailand	Decision	5	3:00
2001-10-19	Win	(Thailand) Kangwanlek Petchyindee	Lumpinee Stadium	Bangkok, Thailand	Decision	5	3:00
2001-	Loss	(Thailand) Kangwanlek Petchyindee	Lumpinee Stadium	Bangkok, Thailand	Decision	5	3:00
2001-07-21	Win	(Thailand) Dewid Lukmahanak	Lumpinee Stadium	Bangkok, Thailand	Decision	5	3:00
2001-06-26	Loss	(Thailand) Petchtapee Liengdonmuang	Petchyindee, Lumpinee Stadium	Bangkok, Thailand	Decision	5	3:00
2001-03-16	Win	(Thailand) Fahsathan Sitmeknoi	Petchyindee, Lumpinee Stadium	Bangkok, Thailand	Decision	5	3:00
2000-05-30	Loss	(Thailand) Fahsathan Sitmeknoi	Lumpinee Stadium	Bangkok, Thailand	Decision	5	3:00
2001-	Win	(Thailand) Kongdej Kiatprapat	Toyota Marathon, Final	Thailand	Decision	3	3:00
Wins the Toyota Marathon Super Flyweight (115 lbs) Tournament.
2000-	Win	(Thailand) Fahsathan Sitmeknoi	Lumpinee Stadium	Bangkok, Thailand	Decision	5	3:00
Legend: Win Loss Draw/No contest Notes

== See also ==
- List of male kickboxers
