= Penek Sitnumnoi =

Thai former professional Muay Thai fighter

- Born: November 10, 1989 (age 36); Phatthalung, Thailand
- Other names: PenAke; Pen-Ek
- Height: 175 cm (5 ft 9 in)
- Division: Featherweight; Super Featherweight; Lightweight
- Style: Muay Thai (Muay Femur)
- Stance: Orthodox
- Team: Singpatong

Penek Sitnumnoi (Thai: เป็นเอก ศิษย์หนุ่มน้อย) is a Thai former professional Muay Thai fighter. He is a former Lumpinee Stadium Featherweight Champion as well as the 2011 Sports Writers Association of Thailand Fighter of the Year. Currently he works as a trainer at Evolve MMA in Singapore.

== Titles and accomplishments ==
- Lumpinee Stadium
  - 2011 Lumpinee Stadium Featherweight (126 lbs) Champion (3 defenses)
- Channel 7 Stadium
  - 2011 Channel 7 Boxing Stadium Super Featherweight (130 lbs) Champion
- World Professional Muaythai Federation
  - 2013 WPMF World Super Featherweight (130 lbs) Champion
- Siam Omnoi Stadium
  - 2010 Siam Omnoi Boxing Stadium Featherweight (126 lbs) Champion

Awards

- 2011 2011 Sports Writers Association of Thailand Fighter of the Year

== Fight record ==
Muay Thai record
Date	Result	Opponent	Event	Location	Method	Round	Time
2014-12-09	Loss	(Thailand) Muangthai PKSaenchaimuaythaigym	Lumpinee Stadium	Bangkok, Thailand	Decision	5	3:00
2014-10-25	Win	(Australia) Mark Saraccino	Patong Boxing Stadium	Phuket, Thailand	TKO	4	
2014-08-08	Loss	(Thailand) Kongsak Saenchaimuaythaigym	Lumpinee Stadium	Bangkok, Thailand	Decision	5	3:00
2014-06-06	Loss	(Thailand) Kongsak Saenchaimuaythaigym	Lumpinee Stadium	Bangkok, Thailand	Decision	5	3:00
2013-11-08	Loss	(Thailand) Saeksan Or. Kwanmuang	Lumpinee Stadium	Bangkok, Thailand	KO (Overhand Right)	2	1:40
2013-08-05	Loss	(Thailand) Pakorn PKSaenchaimuaythaigym	Rajadamnern Stadium	Bangkok, Thailand	Decision	5	3:00
2013-07-09	Loss	(Thailand) Superbank Mor Ratanabandit	Lumpinee Stadium	Bangkok, Thailand	Decision	5	3:00
Loses the Lumpinee Stadium Featherweight (126 lbs) title.
2013-06-03	Win	(Thailand) Pakorn PKSaenchaimuaythaigym	Rajadamnern Stadium	Bangkok, Thailand	Decision	5	3:00
2013-05-17	Win	(France) Amine Kacem	Impacts Fight Night 3	France	Decision	5	3:00
2013-03-30	Win	(Thailand) Pokaew Fonjangchonburi		Koh Samui, Thailand	Decision	5	3:00
Wins the WPMF World Super Featherweight (130 lbs) title.
2012-12-07	Win	(Thailand) Petpanomrung Kiatmuu9	Lumpinee Stadium	Bangkok, Thailand	Decision	5	3:00
Defends the Lumpinee Stadium Featherweight (126 lbs) title.
2012-07-07	Loss	(Thailand) Sagetdao Petpayathai		Phatthalung, Thailand	Decision	5	3:00
For the WPMF World Lightweight (135 lbs) title.
2012-06-08	Loss	(Thailand) Saenchai	Lumpinee Champion Krikkrai Fight	Bangkok, Thailand	Decision	5	3:00
2012-05-04	Win	(Thailand) Sam-A Gaiyanghadao	Lumpinee Stadium	Bangkok, Thailand	Decision	5	3:00
Defends the Lumpinee Stadium Featherweight (126 lbs) title and wins vacant Thailand Super Featherweight (126 lbs) title.
2012-03-09	Win	(Thailand) Wanchalerm Chor.Cheankamon	Lumpinee Stadium	Bangkok, Thailand	KO (Elbow)	4	
Defends the Lumpinee Stadium Featherweight (126 lbs) title.
2012-01-17	Win	(Thailand) Saeksan Or. Kwanmuang	Lumpinee Stadium	Bangkok, Thailand	Decision	5	3:00
2011-	Win	(Thailand) Sittisak Petpayathai		Songkhla province, Thailand	TKO	3	
2011-10-09	Win	(Thailand) Sittisak Petpayathai	Channel 7 Boxing Stadium	Bangkok, Thailand	Decision	5	3:00
Wins Channel 7 Boxing Stadium Super Featherweight (130 lbs) title.
2011-09-06	Win	(Thailand) Mongkolchai Kwaitonggym	Lumpinee Stadium	Bangkok, Thailand	Decision	5	3:00
Wins vacant Lumpinee Stadium Featherweight (126 lbs) title.
2011-08-09	Win	(Thailand) Saenkeng Jor.Noparat	Lumpinee Stadium	Bangkok, Thailand	Decision	5	3:00
2011-	Win	(Thailand) Fahmai Skindiewgym		Phatthalung province, Thailand	Decision	5	3:00
2011-05-27	Win	(Thailand) Pokaew Fonjangchonburi	Lumpinee Stadium	Thailand	Decision	5	3:00
2011-	Draw	(Thailand) Saenkeng Jor.Noparat	Lumpinee Stadium	Bangkok, Thailand	Decision	5	3:00
2011-04-06	Win	(Thailand) Denkiri Sor.Sommai		Songkhla, Thailand	KO (Right Elbow)		
2011-03-20	Win	(Thailand) Sanghiran Lukbanyai		Thailand	Decision	5	3:00
2011-01-25	Win	(Thailand) Sittisak Petpayathai	Lumpinee Stadium	Bangkok, Thailand	Decision	5	3:00
2010-10-23	Win	(Thailand) Sittisak Petpayathai	Bangla Stadium	Phuket, Thailand	Decision	5	3:00
2010-06-19	Win	(Thailand) Phetek Kiatyongyut	Siam Omnoi Boxing Stadium	Thailand	Decision	5	3:00
Wins the Omnoi Stadium Featherweight (126 lbs) title.
2010-04-27	Win	(Thailand) Sittisak Petpayathai	Lumpinee Stadium	Bangkok, Thailand	Decision	5	3:00
2010-03-19	Win	(Thailand) Sanghiran Lukbanyai	Lumpinee Stadium	Bangkok, Thailand	Decision	5	3:00
2010-02-19	Win	(Thailand) Anantachai Lukbanyai	Lumpinee Stadium	Bangkok, Thailand	Decision	5	3:00
2010-01-28	Loss	(Thailand) Anantachai Lukbanyai	Rajadamnern Stadium	Bangkok, Thailand	Decision	5	3:00
2009-12-01	Loss	(Thailand) Rittidet Wor.Wantawee	Lumpinee Stadium	Bangkok, Thailand	Decision	5	3:00
2009-10-27	Draw	(Thailand) Pinsiam Sor.Amnuaysirichoke	Lumpinee Stadium	Bangkok, Thailand	Decision	5	3:00
2009-08-31	Loss	(Thailand) Yosuper Peanratana	Rajadamnern Stadium	Bangkok, Thailand	Decision	5	3:00
2009-05-05	Win	(Thailand) Rungrat Nathreekun	Lumpinee Stadium	Bangkok, Thailand	Decision	5	3:00
2009-04-07	Win	(Thailand) Pinsiam Sor.Amnuaysirichoke	Lumpinee Stadium	Bangkok, Thailand	Decision	5	3:00
2009-01-13	Win	(Thailand) Rungrat Por.Thanaporn	Lumpinee Stadium	Bangkok, Thailand	Decision	5	3:00
2008-09-23	Loss	(Thailand) Rungrat Nathreekun	Lumpinee Stadium	Bangkok, Thailand	Decision	5	3:00
2008-08-08	Loss	(Thailand) Sam-A Gaiyanghadao	Lumpinee Stadium	Bangkok, Thailand	KO (Elbow	4	
2008-04-25	Win	(Thailand) Rakkiat Kiatpraphat	Rajadamnern Stadium	Bangkok, Thailand	Decision	5	3:00
2008-03-25	Win	(Thailand) Denchiangkwan Lamthongkarnpat	Lumpinee Stadium	Bangkok, Thailand	Decision	5	3:00
2008-02-		(Thailand) Kaodeng Surpichitfarm		Hat Yai, Thailand			
2007-05-11	Win	(Thailand) Muangsee Pumpanmuang	Lumpinee Stadium	Bangkok, Thailand	Decision	5	3:00
2007-03-27	Win	(Thailand) Inseekhao Pumpanmuang	Lumpinee Stadium	Bangkok, Thailand	Decision	5	3:00
2007-01-26	Loss	(Thailand) Pueangnoi Phetsupapan	Lumpinee Stadium	Bangkok, Thailand	Decision	5	3:00
2006-10-13	Loss	(Thailand) Punglek Phetsupapan	Lumpinee Stadium	Bangkok, Thailand	Decision	5	3:00
2006-04-04	Win	(Thailand) Amnuaydeat Teded99	Lumpinee Stadium	Bangkok, Thailand	Decision	5	3:00
2006-03-07	Win	(Thailand) Pannarong Sakchaichote	Lumpinee Stadium	Bangkok, Thailand	Decision	5	3:00
2005-02-08	Loss	(Thailand) Sudpatapi Deatrat	Lumpinee Stadium	Bangkok, Thailand	Decision	5	3:00
Legend: Win Loss Draw/No contest Notes
