= Petchboonchu FA Group =

Thai former professional Muay Thai fighter

Petchboonchu F.A.Group
- Born: Yutthapong Sitthichot; May 8, 1990 (age 36); Kumphawapi, Udon Thani, Thailand
- Native name: ยุทธพงษ์ สิทธิโชติ
- Other names: Petchboonchu Bor.Plaboonchu
- Nickname: Deadly Knee of the Mekong (ขุนเข่าริมโขง)
- Height: 180 cm (5 ft 11 in)
- Division: Mini Flyweight; Light Flyweight; Flyweight; Bantamweight; Super Bantamweight; Featherweight; Super Featherweight; Lightweight; Super Lightweight
- Style: Muay Thai (Muay Khao)
- Stance: Orthodox
- Years active: c. 1997-2015

Kickboxing record
- Total: 275
- Wins: 192
- Losses: 82
- Draws: 1

Other information
- Occupation: Muay Thai fighter (retired); Muay Thai trainer Muay Thai promoter

Yutthapong Sitthichot (Thai: ยุทธพงษ์ สิทธิโชติ; born May 8, 1990), known professionally as Petchboonchu F.A.Group (Thai: เพชรบุญชู เอฟ.เอ.กรุ๊ป), is a Thai former professional Muay Thai fighter. He is a former five-time Lumpinee Stadium champion and one-time Rajadamnern Stadium across five divisions who was famous in the 2000s and 2010s. Nicknamed "Deadly Knee of the Mekong", he was especially known for his relentless pressure, clinch, and knees. He is now often regarded amongst the greatest fighters in Muay Thai history. Nowadays he currently works as a Muay Thai promoter.

== Titles and accomplishments ==
- Lumpinee Stadium
  - 2007 Lumpinee Stadium Bantamweight (118 lbs) Champion
  - 2008 Lumpinee Stadium Featherweight (126 lbs) Champion
  - 2009 Lumpinee Stadium Super Featherweight (130 lbs) Champion
  - 2011 Lumpinee Stadium Lightweight (135 lbs) Champion
  - 2013 Lumpinee Stadium Lightweight (135 lbs) Champion
- Rajadamnern Stadium
  - 2014 Rajadamnern Stadium Super Lightweight Welterweight (140 lbs) Champion
- Professional Boxing Association of Thailand (PAT)
  - 2006 Thailand Mini Flyweight (105 lbs) Champion
  - 2006 Thailand Light Flyweight (108 lbs) Champion
  - 2007 Thailand Flyweight (112 lbs) Champion
  - 2008 Thailand Super Bantamweight (122 lbs) Champion
  - 2012 Thailand Lightweight (135 lbs) Champion
  - 2014 Thailand Lightweight (135 lbs) Champion
  - 2014 Thailand Super Lightweight (140 lbs) Champion
- World Muaythai Council
  - 2013 WMC World Lightweight (135 lbs) Champion
- Toyota Marathon
  - 2014 Toyota Marathon Tournament Champion

Awards

- 2013 Siam Keela "Fighter of the Year" Award

== Fight record ==
Muay Thai record
192 Wins, 82 Losses, 1 Draw
Date	Result	Opponent	Event	Location	Method	Round	Time
2015-12-08	Loss	(Thailand) Phetmorakot Petchyindee Academy	Lumpinee Stadium	Bangkok, Thailand	Decision	5	3:00
2015-09-20	Win	(Canada) Matt Embree	Top King World Series	Laos	Decision	3	3:00
2015-06-11	Win	(Thailand) Chamuaktong Fightermuaythai	Rajadamnern Stadium	Bangkok, Thailand	Decision	5	3:00
2015-04-26	Loss	(Thailand) Kongsak Saenchaimuaythaigym	Rangsit Stadium	Bangkok, Thailand	Decision	5	3:00
2015-02-07	Loss	(France) Bobo Sacko	La Nuit des Titans, Final	France	Decision	3	3:00
2015-02-07	Win	(France) Mohamed Galaoui	La Nuit des Titans, Semi Finals	France	TKO	2	
2014-11-29	Loss	(England) Greg Wooton	Power Of Scotland 17	United Kingdom	Decision	5	3:00
2014-10-31	Loss	(Thailand) Nong-O Kaiyanghadaogym	Toyota marathon	Thailand	Decision	3	3:00
2014-10-31	Win	(Thailand) Singdam Kiatmuu9	Toyota tournament	Thailand	Decision	3	3:00
2014-10-09	Loss	(Thailand) Yodwicha Por Boonsit	Rajadamnern Stadium	Bangkok, Thailand	Decision	5	3:00
2014-09-10	Loss	(Thailand) Yodwicha Por Boonsit	Rajadamnern Stadium	Bangkok, Thailand	Decision	5	3:00
2014-07-25	Win	(Thailand) Chamuaktong Fightermuaythai	Toyota Marathon, final	Bangkok, Thailand	Decision	3	3:00
Wins the 2014 Toyota Marathon title.
2014-07-25	Win	(France) Jimmy Vienot	Toyota Marathon, Semi finals	Bangkok, Thailand	Decision	3	3:00
2014-07-25	Win	(Brazil) Victor Nunez	Toyota Marathon, Quarter finals	Bangkok, Thailand	TKO	2	
2014-07-08	Win	(Thailand) Saensatharn P.K. Saenchai Muaythaigym	Lumpinee Stadium	Bangkok, Thailand	TKO	2	
2014-06-11	Win	(Thailand) Yodwicha Por Boonsit	Rajadamnern Stadium	Bangkok, Thailand	Decision	5	3:00
Wins the Rajadamnern Stadium Super Lightweight Welterweight (140 lbs) title.
2014-05-08	Draw	(Thailand) Yodwicha Por Boonsit	Rajadamnern Stadium	Bangkok, Thailand	Draw	5	3:00
2014-02-28	Win	(Thailand) Yodwicha Por Boonsit	Lumpini Stadium	Bangkok, Thailand	Decision	5	3:00
Wins the Thailand Super Lightweight (140 lbs) title.
2014-02-07	Win	(Thailand) Saenchai	Lumpinee Stadium	Bangkok, Thailand	Decision (Unanimous)	5	3:00
Defends the Lumpinee Stadium Lightweight (135 lbs) title.
2014-01-07	Win	(Thailand) Pakorn PKSaenchaimuaythaigym	Lumpinee Stadium	Bangkok, Thailand	Decision	5	3:00
Defends the Lumpinee Stadium Lightweight (135 lbs) title and wins the Thailand Lightweight (135 lbs) title.
2013-12-03	Win	(Thailand) Saenchai	Lumpinee Stadium	Bangkok, Thailand	Decision	5	3:00
2013-10-31	Win	(Iran) Vahid Shahbazi	Toyota Marathon	Thailand	Decision	5	3:00
2013-10-11	Win	(Thailand) Singdam Kiatmuu9	Lumpinee Stadium	Bangkok, Thailand	Decision	5	3:00
Wins the Lumpinee Stadium Lightweight (135 lbs) title.
2013-08-08	Loss	(Thailand) Chamuaktong Fightermuaythai	Rajadamnern Stadium	Bangkok, Thailand	Decision	5	3:00
2013-07-12	Loss	(Thailand) Kongsak Saenchaimuaythaigym	Lumpinee Stadium	Bangkok, Thailand	Decision	5	3:00
2013-05-10	Loss	(Thailand) Singdam Kiatmuu9	Lumpinee Stadium	Bangkok, Thailand	Decision	5	3:00
2013-04-09	Loss	(Thailand) Yodwicha Por Boonsit	Lumpinee Stadium	Bangkok, Thailand	Decision	5	3:00
Loses the Thailand Lightweight (135 lbs) title.
2013-02-07	Win	(Thailand) Thongchai Sitsongpeenong	Rajadamnern Stadium	Bangkok, Thailand	Decision	5	3:00
2013-01-04	Loss	(Thailand) Yodwicha Por Boonsit	Lumpinee Stadium	Bangkok, Thailand	Decision	5	3:00
2012-12-07	Win	(Thailand) Diesellek Aoodonmuang	Lumpinee Stadium	Bangkok, Thailand	Decision	5	3:00
Defends the Thailand Lightweight (135 lbs) title.
2012-10-04	Win	(Thailand) Nong-O Kaiyanghadaogym	Rajadamnern Stadium Wanmitchai Fight	Bangkok, Thailand	Decision	5	3:00
2012-09-07	Win	(Thailand) Sagetdao Petpayathai	Lumpinee Stadium	Bangkok, Thailand	Decision	5	3:00
Wins the Thailand Lightweight (135 lbs) title.
2012-07-31	Loss	(Thailand) Wanchalerm Uddonmuang	Lumpinee Stadium	Bangkok, Thailand	Decision	5	3:00
2012-07-07	Loss	(Thailand) Sagetdao Petpayathai		Surathani, Thailand	Decision	5	3:00
2012-06-08	Loss	(Thailand) Nong-O Kaiyanghadaogym	Lumpinee Champion Krikkrai Fight	Bangkok, Thailand	Decision	5	3:00
2012-04-03	Win	(Thailand) Wanchalerm Uddonmuang	Lumpinee Stadium	Bangkok, Thailand	Decision	5	3:00
2012-03-12	Win	(Thailand) Jomthong Chuwattana	Rajadamnern Stadium	Bangkok, Thailand	Decision	5	3:00
2011-10-07	Loss	(Thailand) Singdam Kiatmuu9	Lumpinee Stadium	Bangkok, Thailand	Decision	5	3:00
2011-09-13	Win	(Thailand) Saenchai	Lumpinee Stadium	Bangkok, Thailand	Decision	5	3:00
2011-08-02	Win	(Thailand) Singdam Kiatmuu9	Lumpinee Stadium	Bangkok, Thailand	Decision	5	3:00
2011-07-07	Win	(Thailand) Sagetdao Petpayathai	Rajadamnern Stadium	Bangkok, Thailand	Decision	5	3:00
Wins the Lumpinee Stadium Lightweight (135 lbs) title.
2011-06-10	Win	(Thailand) Singdam Kiatmuu9	Lumpinee Stadium	Bangkok, Thailand	Decision	5	3:00
Wins the WMC World Lightweight (135 lbs) title.
2011-03-08	Loss	(Thailand) Sagetdao Petpayathai	Lumpinee Stadium	Bangkok, Thailand	Decision	5	3:00
Loses the Lumpinee Stadium Lightweight (135 lbs) title.
2011-01-14	Win	(Thailand) Petchmankong Gaiyanghadao	Lumpinee Stadium	Bangkok, Thailand	Decision	5	3:00
2010-11-02	Loss	(Thailand) Nong-O Kaiyanghadaogym	Suek Lumpinee-Rajadamnern Special	Bangkok, Thailand	TKO	3	
2010-10-05	Loss	(Thailand) Saenchai	Petyindee fights, Lumpinee Stadium	Bangkok, Thailand	Decision	5	3:00
Loses the Lumpinee Stadium Lightweight (135 lbs) title and WMC World Lightweight (135 lbs) title.
2010-09-03	Win	(Thailand) Sagetdao Petpayathai	Lumpinee Stadium	Bangkok, Thailand	Decision	5	3:00
2010-06-04	Win	(Thailand) Sagetdao Petpayathai	Lumpinee Stadium	Bangkok, Thailand	Decision	5	3:00
Wins the Lumpinee Stadium Lightweight (135 lbs) title and the 1 million baht side-bet.
2010-05-07	Loss	(Thailand) Sagetdao Petpayathai	Lumpinee Stadium	Bangkok, Thailand	Decision	5	3:00
2010-03-12	Loss	(Thailand) Nong-O Kaiyanghadaogym	Suek Petyindee, Lumpinee Stadium	Bangkok, Thailand	TKO	2	
For the Lumpinee Stadium Super Featherweight (130 lbs) title.
2010-02-10	Win	(Thailand) Orono Wor Petchpun	Daorungprabath Fight, Rajadamnern Stadium	Bangkok, Thailand	Decision	5	3:00
2009-12-08	Loss	(Thailand) Nong-O Kaiyanghadaogym	Lumpinee Birthday Show	Bangkok, Thailand	TKO	1	
Loses the Lumpinee Stadium Super Featherweight (130 lbs) title.
2009-09-04	Win	(Thailand) Nong-O Kaiyanghadaogym	Suek Muay Thai champions of Lumpinee Champion Krikkrai	Bangkok, Thailand	Decision	5	3:00
2009-08-07	Win	(Thailand) Saenchai	Petchpiya Fight, Lumpinee Stadium	Bangkok, Thailand	Decision	5	3:00
Wins the Lumpinee Stadium Super Featherweight (130 lbs) title
2009-07-03	Loss	(Thailand) Saenchai	Lumpinee vs. Rajadamnern, Lumpinee Stadium, first opponent	Bangkok, Thailand	Decision (Unanimous)	3	3:00
2009-05-01	Loss	(Thailand) Nong-O Kaiyanghadaogym	Suek Petsupapan, Lumpinee Stadium	Bangkok, Thailand	Decision	5	3:00
2009-04-03	Loss	(Thailand) Saenchai	Lumpinee Stadium	Bangkok, Thailand	Decision (Unanimous)	5	3:00
2009-03-06	Win	(Thailand) Jomthong Chuwattana	Suek Krikkrai Fights, Lumpinee Stadium	Bangkok, Thailand	Decision	5	3:00
Defends the Lumpinee Stadium Featherweight (126 lbs) title.
2009-02-06	Win	(Thailand) Wuttidet Lukprabat		Bangkok, Thailand	Decision	5	3:00
2008-12-09	Win	(Thailand) Sanghiran Lukbanyai	Lumpinee Stadium	Bangkok, Thailand	Decision	5	3:00
2008-10-31	Win	(Thailand) Pansak Look Bor Kor	Lumpinee Stadium	Bangkok, Thailand	Decision	5	3:00
Wins the Lumpinee Stadium Featherweight (126 lbs) title.
2008-09-30	Loss	(Thailand) Wuttidet Lukprabat	Lumpinee Stadium	Bangkok, Thailand	Decision	5	3:00
2008-09-03	Win	(Thailand) Puengnoi Phetsupapan	Lumpinee Stadium	Bangkok, Thailand	Decision	5	3:00
2008-08-08	Win	(Thailand) Karnchai Fairtex	Lumpinee Stadium	Bangkok, Thailand	Decision	5	3:00
2008-07-29	Win	(Thailand) Tamwit Or Patcharee	Lumpinee Stadium	Bangkok, Thailand	Decision	5	3:00
2008-07-04	Win	(Thailand) Rungruanglek Lukprabat	Lumpinee Stadium	Bangkok, Thailand	Decision	5	3:00
2008-06-04	Win	(Thailand) Detnarong Sitjaboon	Rajadamnern Stadium	Bangkok, Thailand	Decision	5	3:00
2008-05-02	Win	(Thailand) Kaptiankane Narupai	Lumpinee Stadium	Bangkok, Thailand	Decision	5	3:00
Wins the Thailand Super Bantamweight (122 lbs) title.
2008-02-29	Loss	(Thailand) Sam-A Gaiyanghadao	Lumpinee Stadium	Bangkok, Thailand	TKO (Low kicks)	4	
2008-01-29	Win	(Thailand) Meakpayak		Thailand	Decision	5	3:00
2008-01-04	Loss	(Thailand) Sam-A Gaiyanghadao	Lumpinee Stadium	Bangkok, Thailand	Decision	5	3:00
2007-12-07	Win	(Thailand) Rakkiat Kiatprapat	Lumpinee Stadium	Bangkok, Thailand	Decision	5	3:00
Wins the Lumpinee Stadium Bantamweight (118 lbs) title.
2007-11-02	Win	(Thailand) Doungpichit		Thailand	Decision	5	3:00
2007-07-06	Win	(Thailand) Panomrunglek Kiatmoo9	Lumpinee Stadium	Thailand	Decision	5	3:00
2007-06-05	Win	(Thailand) Kompichit RiflorniaSauna		Thailand	Decision	5	3:00
Wins the Thailand Flyweight (112 lbs) title.
2007-05-04	Win	(Thailand) Yodpetaek Sritmanarong		Thailand	TKO	2	
2007-01-30	Win	(Thailand) Suwitlek K.Sapaotong		Thailand	DQ	4	
2006-12-22	Win	(Thailand) Leamphet Sitjepatum		Thailand	Decision	5	3:00
2006-11-24	Win	(Thailand) Yodrachan Or Kietbanphot		Thailand	Decision	5	3:00
Wins the Thailand Light Flyweight (108 lbs) title.
2006-07-14	Loss	(Thailand) Lekkla Thanasuranakorn		Bangkok, Thailand	Decision	5	3:00
Loses Thailand Mini Flyweight (105 lbs) title.
2006-04-25	Win	(Thailand) Lekkla Thanasuranakorn		TBangkok, hailand	Decision	5	3:00
Wins Thailand Mini a flyweight (105 lbs) title.
2006-05-17	Loss	(Thailand) Wanheng Menayothin	Meenayothin, Rajadamnern Stadium	Bangkok, Thailand	TKO (Referee stoppage)	3	
2006-03-24	Win	(Thailand) Yodpoj Sor.Skaorath		Thailand	Decision	5	3:00
2005-11-15	Win	(Thailand) Buriangnong		Thailand	Decision	5	3:00
2005-09-10	Win	(Thailand) Lemphet S.Werapon	Lumpinee Stadium	Bangkok, Thailand	Decision	5	3:00
2005-08-10	Loss	(Thailand) Lekkla Thanasuranakorn	Rajadamnern Stadium	Bangkok, Thailand	Decision	5	3:00
2005-07-29	Win	(Thailand) Petsiam Sor.Pantip	Lumpinee Stadium	Bangkok, Thailand	Decision	5	3:00
2005-06-28	Win	(Thailand) Kaosod Ror.Kilaangtong	Lumpinee Stadium	Bangkok, Thailand	Decision	5	3:00
2005-03-04	Loss	(Thailand) Lekkla Thanasuranakorn	Petchyindee, Lumpinee Stadium	Bangkok, Thailand	Decision	5	3:00
2005-02-01	Win	(Thailand) Luktob Mor Siprasert		Thailand	Decision	5	3:00
2004-09-04	Win	(Thailand) Mi Romsitong		Thailand	Decision	5	3:00
2004-08-10	Win	(Thailand) Petchnoi		Thailand	Decision	5	3:00
Legend: Win Loss Draw/No contest Notes

Amateur Muay Thai record
Date	Result	Opponent	Event	Location	Method	Round	Time
2016-05-28	Loss	(Russia) Magomed Zaynukov	2016 IFMA World Championships, Final	Jönköping, Sweden	Decision (29:28)	3	3:00
Wins 2016 IFMA World Championships 67kg Silver Medal.
2016-05-26	Win	(Turkey) Aii Batmaz	2016 IFMA World Championships, Semi Finals	Jönköping, Sweden	Decision (30:27)	3	3:00
2016-05-24	Win	(Bulgaria) Anton Petrov	2016 IFMA World Championships, Quarter Finals	Jönköping, Sweden	Decision (29:28)	3	3:00
2016-05-21	Win	(Belarus) Dmitry Varats	2016 IFMA World Championships, 1/8 Finals	Jönköping, Sweden	Decision (29:28)	3	3:00
Legend: Win Loss Draw/No contest Notes
