= Sagetdao Petpayathai =

Thai former professional Muay Thai fighter and mixed martial artist

- Born: Kittichai Churat; January 1, 1987 (age 39); Kham Riang, Kantharawichai, Maha Sarakham, Thailand
- Native name: กิตติชัย ชูรัตน์
- Nickname: The Falling Star (สะเก็ดดาว); Deadly Star (ดาวมฤตยู)
- Height: 172 cm (5 ft 8 in)
- Division: Flyweight; Featherweight; Lightweight; Super Lightweight
- Style: Muay Thai (Muay Khao)
- Stance: Southpaw
- Team: Nalakap Gym (1997–2004); Kiatpetch Gym (2004–2014); Evolve MMA (2014–present)
- Trainer: Taveesak Yutthajit

Kickboxing record
- Total: 226
- Wins: 163
- Losses: 62
- Draws: 1

Mixed martial arts record
- Total: 4
- Wins: 3
- By knockout: 3
- Losses: 1
- By decision: 1

Other information
- Mixed martial arts record from Sherdog

Kittichai Churat (Thai: กิตติชัย ชูรัตน์; born January 1, 1987), known professionally as Sagetdao Petpaiyathai (Thai: สะเก็ดดาว เพชรพญาไท) is a Thai former professional Muay Thai fighter and mixed martial artist. He is a three-time Lumpinee Stadium champion and one-time Rajadamnern Stadium champion across two divisions. He was especially known for his powerful knee and clinch style of fighting. Nowadays he teaches at Evolve MMA in Singapore.

== Biography ==
=== Early life ===
Sagetdao is one of three children in his family, but he's the only child to have fought in Muay Thai. Sagetdao began his career at the age of 10 at the Nalakap Gym in Maha Sarakham, Northeast Thailand. He fought around 100 times for this camp over the course of 7 years. At 17 he moved to Bangkok and began training at the Kiatpetch Gym.

=== Muay Thai career ===
In 2007, he captured stadium titles at both Lumpinee Boxing Stadium and Rajadamnern Boxing Stadium. By 2008, he was a household name in the Muay Thai world and made the top fighters take notice when he knocked out veteran Nongbee Kiatyongyut on a Channel 7 broadcast.

=== 2009 ===
In 2009 he participated in a special rules fight where he teamed with Petchboonchu FA Group to take on #1 fighter, Saenchai Sinbimuaythai and the duo was defeated. After losing to Saenchai, Sagetdao would go to England and fight their best fighter, Liam Harrison. Sagetdao frustrated the Englishman with hard kicks and survived big punches to earn a decision. After this victory, Sagetdao would once again meet up with Saenchai, but this time he was doing it on his own. The fight took place at the annual year-end Lumpini stadium birthday show. Most expected Saenchai to win comfortably, Sagetdao, however, had other plans, and he stunned the crowd by beating Saenchai over 5 rounds.

=== 2010–present ===
In 2010 he beat fellow clinch master, Petchboonchu FA Group, and closed the year out strong by stopping Denkiri Sor. Sommai with a body punch that would be voted channel 7 fight of the year. In 2011 he beat Nong-O Sit Or, Petchboonchu FA Group, Saenchai Sinbimuaythai, and Singdam Kiatmuu9. In October he would once again fight abroad, this time in America, his opponent was American, Kevin Ross. This fight was for the WBC Diamond super lightweight belt and Sagetdao would win with a stoppage at the end of round 3 because of a large cut on Ross's head from an elbow. In 2012 he lost his first 3 fights. In his 4th fight of the year he beat Petchboonchu FA Group, and in his 5th he beat Penek Sitnumnoi He beat Sofiane Derdega to retain the WBC super lightweight championship.

He rematched Singdam Kiatmuu9 at Lumpinee on March 8, 2013, and lost on points.

On 5 April 2013 he beat Umar Semata at Muay Thai Warriors in Pattaya to win the Muay Thai Warriors World Super Featherweight Title.

He defended his WBC super lightweight title against Tetsuya Yamato at M-One: Reborn in Highland, California, US on May 16, 2013, defeating the Japanese challenger via TKO due to a cut in round four.

He lost to Pakorn Sakyothin by unanimous decision at Lumpinee on June 9, 2013.

He won the four-man 68 kg tournament at MAX Muay Thai 3 in Zhengzhou, China on August 10, 2013., beating Liam Harrison by decision in the semi-finals and defeating Zhang Dezhang after an extension round in the final.

He beat two opponents on points, Andrei Kulebin in the semi-finals and Victor Nagbe in the final, to win the tournament at MAX Muay Thai 5: The Final Chapter in Khon Kaen, Thailand on December 10, 2013.

=== First TKO loss to a foreigner ===
On February 16, 2014, Sagetdao suffered his first TKO loss and first foreigner loss to Qiu Jianliang. He was rocked numerous times by Qiu's punches during the course of the fight. Finally, he was knocked down by a straight left punch to the chin. The referee called the stoppage to the fight after Qiu finished him with flurry of punches in the last 10 seconds of the fight.

=== Return to Muay Thai ===
Sagetdao made his return to Muay Thai at ONE Championship: Reign of Dynasties 2 on October 16, 2020. His faced Zhang Chunyu, with it being his first time competing under the ONE Super Series ruleset, as well as his first Muay Thai fight since 2014. He would go on to win by unanimous decision.

=== Mixed martial arts career ===
In 2017, Sagetdao began a career in mixed martial arts. He signed for the Singapore-based organization ONE Championship. He made his debut that March, with a first-round TKO of Kevin Ong. He finished the year with two more first-round stoppage victories, against Mahmoud Mohamed and Jimmy Yabo.

Sagetdao suffered his first defeat in MMA on June 30, 2018. He was announced as winning his bout with Ma Jia Wen by unanimous decision, but the result was later overturned, and the win was awarded to Ma.

== Titles and accomplishments ==
=== Muay Thai ===
- Lumpinee Stadium
  - 2007 Lumpinee Stadium Featherweight (126 lbs)
  - 2007 Lumpinee Stadium Fighter of the Year
  - 2010 Lumpinee Stadium Lightweight (135 lbs) Champion
  - 2012 Lumpinee Stadium Lightweight (135 lbs) Champion
- Rajadamnern Stadium
  - 2007 Rajadamnern Stadium Featherweight (126 lbs) Champion
- Channel 7 Boxing Stadium
  - Channel 7 Stadium Pinweight (102 lbs)Champion
- Muay Thai Warriors
  - 2011 Muay Thai Warriors Super Featherweight (126 lbs) Champion
- Muay Thai Association of America
  - 2011 MTAA Super Lightweight (140 lbs) Champion
- WBC Muaythai
  - 2011 WBC Diamond Super Lightweight (140 lbs) Champion
  - 2012 WBC Super Lightweight (140 lbs) Champion
- World Professional Muaythai Federation
  - 2012 W.P.M.F. World Lightweight (135 lbs) Champion
- MAX Muay Thai
  - 2013 MAX Muay Thai 5: The Final Chapter Tournament Champion
  - 2013 MAX Muay Thai 3 Tournament Championship
- Awards
  - 2007 Sports Authority of Thailand Fighter of the Year
  - 2009 Sports Authority of Thailand Fighter of the Year

== Muay Thai record ==
Professional Muay Thai Record
164 Wins, 62 Losses, 1 Draw
Date	Result	Opponent	Event	Location	Method	Round	Time
2020-10-16	Win	(China) Zhang Chunyu	ONE Championship: Reign of Dynasties 2	Kallang, Singapore	Decision (Unanimous)	3	3:00
2014-11-15	Loss	(Japan) Tetsuya Yamato	NJKF	Tokyo, Japan	TKO (Cut)	3	
2014-09-05	Loss	(Thailand) Pakorn PKSaenchaimuaythaigym	Lumpinee Stadium	Bangkok, Thailand	Decision (unanimous)	5	3:00
2014-06-06	Win	(Thailand) Yodpanomrung Jitmuangnon	Lumpinee Stadium	Bangkok, Thailand	Decision (unanimous)	5	3:00
2014-05-02	Loss	(Thailand) Yodpanomrung Jitmuangnon	Lumpinee Stadium	Bangkok, Thailand	Decision (unanimous)	5	3:00
2014-04-08	Win	(Thailand) Panpet Kiatcbaroenchai	Lumpinee Stadium	Bangkok, Thailand	Decision	5	3:00
2014-02-16	Loss	(China) Qiu Jianliang	MAX Muay Thai 6	Zhengzhou, China	TKO (Referee Stoppage)	3	2:59
2013-12-10	Win	(Australia) Victor Nagbe	MAX Muay Thai 5: The Final Chapter, Final	Khon Kaen, Thailand	Decision	3	3:00
Wins the MAX Muay Thai 5: The Final Chapter Tournament title.
2013-12-10	Win	(Belarus) Andrei Kulebin	MAX Muay Thai 5: The Final Chapter, Semi Finals	Khon Kaen, Thailand	Decision	3	3:00
2013-08-10	Win	(China) Zhang Dezheng	MAX Muay Thai 3, Final	Zhengzhou, China	Extension round decision	4	3:00
Wins the MAX Muay Thai Tournament title.
2013-08-10	Win	(England) Liam Harrison	MAX Muay Thai 3, Semi Finals	Zhengzhou, China	Decision	3	3:00
2013-07-09	Loss	(Thailand) Pakorn PKSaenchaimuaythaigym	Lumpinee Stadium	Bangkok, Thailand	Decision (unanimous)	5	3:00
2013-05-16	Win	(Japan) Tetsuya Yamato	M-One: Reborn	Highland, California, USA	TKO (cut)	4	1:38
Defends the WBC World Super Lightweight (140 lbs) title.
2013-04-05	Win	(Uganda) Umar Semata	Muay Thai Warriors	Thailand	Decision	5	3:00
2013-03-08	Loss	(Thailand) Singdam Kiatmuu9	Lumpinee Stadium	Bangkok, Thailand	Decision	5	3:00
2012-12-07	Win	(Thailand) Mongkolchai Kwaitonggym	Lumpinee Stadium	Bangkok, Thailand	Decision	5	3:00
2012-11-11	Loss	(Thailand) Wanchalerm Uddonmuang		Phatthalung, Thailand	Decision	5	3:00
2012-09-07	Loss	(Thailand) Petchboonchu FA Group	Lumpinee Stadium	Bangkok, Thailand	Decision	5	3:00
2012-06-09	Win	(France) Sofiane Dergdega	WBC Battle for the Belts	Thailand	TKO (cut)	3	
2012-07-07	Win	(Thailand) Penake Sitnumnoi		Phatthalung, Thailand	Decision	5	3:00
Wins the WPMF World Lightweight (135 lbs) title.
2012-07-07	Win	(Thailand) Petchboonchu FA Group		Surathani, Thailand	Decision	5	3:00
2012-04-03	Loss	(Thailand) Singdam Kiatmuu9	Lumpinee Stadium	Bangkok, Thailand	Decision	5	3:00
2012-03-09	Loss	(Thailand) Saenchai Sinbimuaythai	Lumpinee Stadium	Bangkok, Thailand	Decision	5	3:00
2012-02-07	Loss	(Thailand) Wanchalerm Uddonmuang	Lumpinee Stadium	Bangkok, Thailand	Decision	5	3:00
2011-12-09	Win	(Thailand) Saenchai Sinbimuaythai	Lumpinee Stadium	Bangkok, Thailand	Decision	5	3:00
2011-10-21	Win	(United States) Kevin Ross	M1 Muay Thai Nokia Theater	Los Angeles, USA	TKO (cut)	3	3:00
2011-09-06	Win	(Thailand) Singdam Kiatmuu9	Lumpinee Stadium	Bangkok, Thailand	Decision	5	3:00
2011-07-07	Loss	(Thailand) Petchboonchu FA Group	Rajadamnern Stadium	Bangkok, Thailand	Decision	5	3:00
2011-06-10	Win	(Thailand) Saenchai Sinbimuaythai	Lumpinee Stadium	Bangkok, Thailand	Decision	5	3:00
Defends the Lumpinee Stadium Lightweight (135 lbs) title.
2011-05-05	Loss	(Thailand) Singdam Kiatmuu9	Rajadamnern Stadium	Bangkok, Thailand	Decision	5	3:00
2011-03-08	Win	(Thailand) Petchboonchu FA Group	Lumpinee Stadium	Bangkok, Thailand	Decision	5	3:00
Wins the vacant Lumpinee Stadium Lightweight (135 lbs) title.
2011-01-25	Win	(Thailand) Nong-O Sit Or	Lumpinee Stadium	Bangkok, Thailand	Decision	5	3:00
2010-11-14	Win	(Thailand) Denkiri Sor. Sommai	Channel 7	Bangkok, Thailand	KO (punch)	4	
2010-09-03	Loss	(Thailand) Petchboonchu FA Group	Lumpinee Stadium	Bangkok, Thailand	Decision	5	3:00
2010-07-13	Loss	(Thailand) Saenchai Sinbimuaythai	Lumpinee Stadium	Bangkok, Thailand	Decision	5	3:00
2010-06-04	Loss	(Thailand) Petchboonchu FA Group	Lumpinee Stadium	Bangkok, Thailand	Decision	5	3:00
Loses the Lumpinee Stadium Lightweight (135 lbs) title and the 1 million baht side-bet.
2010-05-07	Win	(Thailand) Petchboonchu FA Group	Lumpinee Stadium	Bangkok, Thailand	Decision	5	3:00
2010-03-13	Win	(France) Mehdi Zatout	France VS Thaïlande	Bagnolet, France	Decision	5	3:00
2010-02-12	Loss	(Thailand) Nong-O Sit Or	Lumpinee Stadium	Bangkok, Thailand	Decision	5	3:00
2009-12-08	Win	(Thailand) Saenchai Sinbimuaythai	Lumpinee Stadium	Bangkok, Thailand	Decision	5	3:00
Wins the vacant Lumpinee Stadium Lightweight (135 lbs) title.
2009-11-07	Win	(England) Liam Harrison	MSA Muay Thai	England, UK	TKO body kick	5	3:00
2009-10-18	Win	(Thailand) Puja Sor.Suwanee	Channel 7 Stadium	Bangkok, Thailand	Decision	5	3:00
2009-08-31	Win	(Thailand) Daoprakay Or. Kwanmuang	Rajadamnern Stadium	Bangkok, Thailand	Decision	5	3:00
2009-07-03	Loss	(Thailand) Saenchai Sinbimuaythai	Lumpinee Stadium	Bangkok, Thailand	Decision	5	3:00
2009-06-21	Loss	(Thailand) Jomthong Chuwattana	Rajadamnern Stadium	Bangkok, Thailand	Decision	5	3:00
2009-04-30	Win	(Thailand) Anuwat Kaewsamrit	Rajadamnern Stadium	Bangkok, Thailand	Decision	5	3:00
Defends the Rajadamnern Stadium Featherweight (126 lbs) title.
2009-	Win	(Thailand) Chok Eminentair	Channel 7	Bangkok, Thailand	Decision	5	3:00
2008-12-28	Win	(Thailand) Nongbee Kiatyongyut	Channel 7	Bangkok, Thailand	KO (punch)	3	3:00
2008-10-02	Win	(Thailand) Petsanguon Sitniwal	Rajadamnern Stadium	Bangkok, Thailand	Decision	5	3:00
2008-08-22	Loss	(Thailand) Jomthong Chuwattana	Lumpinee Stadium	Bangkok, Thailand	Decision	5	3:00
2008-07-31	Win	(Thailand) Nongbee Kiatyongyut	Daorung Chujaroen, Rajadamnern Stadium	Bangkok, Thailand	Decision	5	3:00
2008-07-01	Draw	(Thailand) Nongbee Kiatyongyut	Sangmorakot, Lumpinee Stadium	Bangkok, Thailand	Decision	5	3:00
2008-03-04	Win	(Thailand) Jomthong Chuwattana	Lumpinee Stadium	Bangkok, Thailand	Decision	5	3:00
2007-12-07	Loss	(Thailand) Nong-O Sit Or	Lumpinee Stadium	Bangkok, Thailand	Decision	5	3:00
Loses the Lumpinee Stadium Featherweight (126 lbs) title.
2007-11-09	Win	(Thailand) Rittidet Sombatjaren	Lumpinee Stadium	Bangkok, Thailand	Decision	5	3:00
2007-09-07	Win	(Thailand) Chalermdet Sor.Tawanrung	Lumpinee Stadium	Bangkok, Thailand	Decision	5	3:00
Wins the vacant Lumpinee Stadium Featherweight (126 lbs) title.
2007-05-29	Win	(Thailand) Pansak Look Bor Kor	Lumpinee Stadium	Bangkok, Thailand	Decision	5	3:00
2007-02-23	Win	(Thailand) Ninmongkon Kaennorsing	Lumpinee Stadium	Bangkok, Thailand	Decision	5	3:00
2007-01-26	Win	(Thailand) Wanchana Sasaprapagym	Lumpinee Stadium	Bangkok, Thailand	Decision	5	3:00
2006-12-28	Loss	(Thailand) Pansak Look Bor Kor	Lumpinee Stadium	Bangkok, Thailand	Decision	5	3:00
2006-11-03	Win	(Thailand) Pansak Look Bor Kor	Lumpinee Stadium	Bangkok, Thailand	Decision	5	3:00
2006-09-29	Loss	(Thailand) Ragkiat Kiatprapat	Lumpinee Stadium	Bangkok, Thailand	Decision	5	3:00
2006-08-15	Win	(Thailand) Pinsiam Sor.Amnuaysirichoke	Lumpinee Stadium	Bangkok, Thailand	Decision	5	3:00
2006-04-04	Loss	(Thailand) Kanchai Chor.Sangpraphai	Lumpinee Stadium	Bangkok, Thailand	Decision	5	3:00
2006-03-07	Win	(Thailand) Hansuk V Soontonnon	Lumpinee Stadium	Bangkok, Thailand	Decision	5	3:00
2005-12-27	Win	(Thailand) Visanlak Sor.Todsapon	Lumpinee Stadium	Bangkok, Thailand	Decision	5	3:00
2005-11-08	Win	(Thailand) Ninmongkon Kaennorsing	Lumpinee Stadium	Bangkok, Thailand	Decision	5	3:00
2005-10-11	Loss	(Thailand) Nonmongkon Kaennorsing	Lumpinee Stadium	Bangkok, Thailand	Decision	5	3:00
2005-06-07	Win	(Thailand) Denchiangkwan Leamtongkarnpet	Lumpinee Stadium	Bangkok, Thailand	Decision	5	3:00
2005-04-12	Loss	(Thailand) Therdhailak Nakontongparkview	Lumpinee Stadium	Bangkok, Thailand	Decision	5	3:00
For the Lumpinee Stadium Flyweight (112 lbs) title.
2005-03-01	Win	(Thailand) Maneedaeng Kiatprapat	Lumpinee Stadium	Bangkok, Thailand	Decision	5	3:00
2005-02-08	Loss	(Thailand) Maneedaeng Kiatprapat	Lumpinee Stadium	Bangkok, Thailand	Decision	5	3:00
2004-09-10	Win	(Thailand) Yodtuantong Baskamaraigym	Lumpinee Stadium	Bangkok, Thailand	Decision	5	3:00
2004-05-11	Win	(Thailand) German Rungleamfarn	Lumpinee Stadium	Bangkok, Thailand	Decision	5	3:00
2004-01-09	Win	(Thailand) Yokkao B Burapha	Lumpinee Stadium	Bangkok, Thailand	Decision	5	3:00
Legend: Win Loss Draw/No contest Notes

== Mixed martial arts record ==
Professional record breakdown
4 matches	3 wins	1 loss
By knockout	3	0
By decision	0	1

Res.	Record	Opponent	Method	Event	Date	Round	Time	Location	Notes
Loss	3–1	Ma Jiawen	Decision (overturned by promoter)	ONE: Spirit of a Warrior	June 29, 2018	3	5:00	Yangon, Myanmar	Lightweight debut. Originally a unanimous decision win for Sagetdao; overturned by promoter due to a miscalculation in scores.
Win	3–0	Jimmy Yabo	KO (knee to the body)	ONE: Warriors of the World	December 9, 2017	1	2:44	Bangkok, Thailand	
Win	2–0	Mahmoud Deab Mohamed	TKO (elbows)	ONE: Shanghai	September 2, 2017	1	1:41	Shanghai, China	
Win	1–0	Kelvin Ong	TKO (knee and punches)	ONE: Warrior Kingdom	March 11, 2017	1	2:20	Bangkok, Thailand	Featherweight debut.
