= Thongchai Sitsongpeenong =

Thai Muay Thai kickboxer (born 1996)

- Born: Saranon Glompan; January 22, 1996 (age 30); Nakhon Ratchasima, Thailand
- Native name: ธงชัย ศิษย์สองพี่น้อง
- Other names: Thai Terminator
- Nationality: Thai
- Height: 1.78 m (5 ft 10 in)
- Weight: 70 kg (154 lb; 11 st); 77 kg (170 lb; 12.1 st)
- Division: Welterweight; Middleweight
- Reach: 72.5 in (184 cm)
- Style: Muay Thai
- Stance: Orthodox
- Fighting out of: Bangkok, Thailand
- Team: Sitsongpeenong Muaythai
- Trainer: Anuaysil Bunphengsri "Monlit Sitphodaeng", Jakkrit Fairtex, Tong Sitsongpeenong
- Years active: 2007–present

Kickboxing record
- Total: 177
- Wins: 138
- By knockout: 18
- Losses: 39
- Draws: 0

Other information
- Website: www.sitsongpeenong.com
- Last updated on: June 16, 2017

Medal record

Men's Pencak silat

Representing Thailand

Southeast Asian Games
Silver medal – second place	2021 Hanoi	90–95 kg
Bronze medal – third place	2023 Phnom Penh	85–90 kg

World Championships
Bronze medal – third place	2022 Melaka	85–90 kg

Thongchai Sitsongpeenong (Thai: ธงชัย ศิษย์สองพี่น้อง, Thai pronunciation: [tʰōŋ.tɕʰchāj sìtsɔ̌ːŋpʰîːnɔ́ːŋ]; born January 22, 1996) is a Thai Muay Thai kickboxer. As of June 2016, he is ranked #9 at Rajadamnern Stadium at 160 lbs and #10 by World Boxing Council Muaythai at 160 lbs. Thongchai has also previously competed for Glory from 2016 to 2018, where he most notably participated in the 2018 Glory Welterweight Contender Tournament.

In addition to Muay Thai, Thongchai has also competed in pencak silat, where he has won the silver medal at the 2021 Southeast Asian Games in the 90–95 kg event and the bronze medal at the 2022 World Championship in the 85–90 kg event.

== Biography and career ==
Thongchai Sitsongpeenong was born as Saranon Glompan in Nakhon Ratchasima in the northeastern (Isan) region of Thailand on January 22, 1996. He had his first fight at the age of 11 in 2007.

On June 7, 2013, Thongchai won the vacant Lumpinee Stadium title in the welterweight division (147 lbs). His first fight outside of Thailand was on November 23, 2013, in Macau, China, against Eleha Nohi at 70 kg. Thongchai won after a three-round decision. His second fight outside of Thailand was on December 13, 2013, in Russia against Khayal Dzaniev. Dzaniev is one of the few fighters who have beaten Buakaw Banchamek, which happened in the TopKing World Series Semifinal Tournament. Thongchai defeated Dzaniev via technical knock out in the third round and won the WMC Intercontintental Super Welterweight Championship title at 154 lb.

Thongchai lost in a highly controversial bout against Tobby Smith on January 3, 2014. It has been argued that he won rounds one and two, and it being a three-round fight, he should have won the bout. His next international fight was in France on February 8, 2014. He won against Fabio Pinca after five rounds. He broke Pinca's arm, causing Pinca to not be able to fight for 15 months. Thongchai went on to fight at the IFMA World Championships tournament in Malaysia from May 4–9, 2014. He won gold in the 71 kg division. Thongchai next fought Vong Noy in Cambodia, winning by second-round knock out on August 3, 2014.

Thongchai then fought for Top King World Series. On November 15, 2014, he fought for in Paris, France, winning a three-round decision against Samy Sana. In 2015, he fought three more times in the Top King World Series. On July 28, he won via first round knock out against Collin Law. On September 4, he won via first round knock out against Aydin Tuncay. On October 17, he won via third round technical knock out against Adrien Rubis.

== Titles and achievements ==
=== Kickboxing ===
- Glory
  - 2018 Glory Welterweight Contender Tournament Runner-up (77 kg/170 lb)

=== Muay Thai ===
- International Federation of Muaythai Amateur
  - (gold) 2014 IFMA World Championships Gold (71 kg)
- Lumpinee Stadium
  - 2013 Lumpinee Stadium Welterweight Championship (147 lb)
- World Muaythai Council
  - 2013 WMC Intercontinental Super Welterweight Championship (154 lb)

=== Pencak silat ===
- Southeast Asian Games
  - (silver) 2021 Southeast Asian Games Men's Pencak silat Tanding (match) 90–95kg – Second place
  - (bronze) 2023 Southeast Asian Games Men's Pencak silat Tanding (match) 85–90kg – Third place

=== Current ranking ===
- N°9 Rajadamnern Stadium at Middleweight (160 lb), April 2016
- N°10 WBC Muaythai at Middleweight (160 lb), May 2016

== Fight record ==
Kickboxing record
138 Wins (18 (T)KO's), 39 Losses, 0 Draws
Date	Result	Opponent	Event	Location	Method	Round	Time
2022-02-19	Win	(Iran) Mohsen Hosseini	Muay Hardcore	Thailand	TKO	1	
2018-08-23	Loss	(France) Hamza Ngoto	Best of Siam XIII	Thailand	KO (Right Elbow)	2	
2018-07-06	Loss	(Slovakia) Vladimír Moravčík	All Star Fight 5	Czech Republic	decision	3	3:00
2018-05-12	Loss	(France) Cedric Doumbe	Glory 53: Lille	Lille, France	KO (Overhand Right)	1	0:33
2018-03-03	Loss	(Aruba) Eyevan Danenberg	Glory 51: Rotterdam	Rotterdam, Netherlands	Decision (unanimous)	3	3:00
Welterweight Contender Tournament, Final
2018-03-03	Win	(Argentina) Alan Scheinson	Glory 51: Rotterdam	Rotterdam, Netherlands	Decision (Split)	3	3:00
Welterweight Contender Tournament, Semi-Finals
2017-09-02	Win	(China) Sun Weiqiang	Wu Lin Feng 2017	Xi'an, China	Decision (unanimous)	3	3:00
2017-08-05	Loss	(Morocco) Mohamed Mezouari	Fight League 7	Tangier, Morocco	TKO (Low Kick)	2	
For Fight League -76kg World Championship.
2017-02-24	Loss	(Netherlands) Murthel Groenhart	Glory 38: Chicago	Hoffman Estates, Illinois	TKO (Punches)	3	1:45
2016-10-21	Win	(United States) Casey Greene	Glory 34: Denver	Broomfield, Colorado	KO	2	2:58
2016-09-10	Loss	(China) Nurla Mulali	Kunlun Fight 51	Fuzhou, China	Decision (Majority)	3	3:00
2016-07-10	Win	(France) Olivier Feher	Super Muaythai Workpoint	Thailand	TKO Round 3	3	—N/a
2015-10-17	Win	(France) Adrien Rubis	Top King World Series	Ningbo, China	TKO Round 3	3	2:30
2015-09-04	Win	(Turkey) Aydin Tuncay	Top King World Series	Zhoukou, China	KO Round 1	1	2:40
2015-07-28	Win	(Hong Kong) Colin Law	Top King World Series	Kitec, Hong Kong	KO Round 1	1	1:17
2015-05-16	Win	(Thailand) Rungrawee P.K.SaenchaiMuaythaiGym	TV3	Thailand	Decision	5	3:00
2014-11-15	Win	(France) Samy Sana	Top King World Series	Paris, France	Decision	3	3:00
2014-09-27	Lost	(Thailand) Peemai Jitmuangnon	Siam Omnoi Stadium	Bangkok, Thailand	Decision	5	3:00
2014-08-03	Win	(Cambodia) Vong Noy	TV3	Cambodia	KO	2	00:52
2014-06-14	Win	(Belgium) Youssef Boughanem	Best of Siam 5	Paris, France	TKO	3	00:44
2014-03-21	Win	(France) Karem Bezzouh	Naikhanom Tom PRO Champions	Ayutthaya, Thailand	Decision	3	3:00
Wins the Nakhanom Tom PRO Championship.
2014-03-19	Win	(Thailand) Apichart	Naikhanom Tom PRO Champions	Ayutthaya, Thailand	KO	2	—N/a
2014-03-18	Win	(Thailand) Ekachai Parinyo	Naikhanom Tom PRO Champions	Ayutthaya, Thailand	KO	1	—N/a
2014-02-08	Win	(France) Fabio Pinca	La Nuit des Titans Tours	France	Decision	5	3:00
2014-01-03	Lost	(Australia) Tobby Smith	Muay Thai Combat Mania YOKKAO 6	Pattaya, Thailand	Decision	3	3:00
2013-12-13	Win	(Russia) Khayal Dzhaniev		Chelyabinsk, Russia	TKO	3	—N/a
Wins WMC Intercontinental Super Welterweight Championship (154 lb)
2013-11-23	Win	(South Korea) Eleha Nohi			Decision	3	3:00
2013-09-26	Win	(Belgium) Yassine Boughanem			Decision	5	3:00
2013-06-7	Win	(Thailand) Fahmongkol S.J. Danrayong	Lumpinee Stadium	Bangkok, Thailand	Decision	5	3:00
Wins vacant Lumpinee Stadium Welterweight Title (147 lb)
2013-05-10	Win	(Thailand) Petchmankong Gaiyanghadao		Bangkok, Thailand	Decision	5	3:00
2013-04-05	Lost	(Thailand) Wanchalerm Ouddonmueang		Bangkok, Thailand	KO	3	—N/a
2013-03-08	Win	(France) Damien Alamos	Lumpinee Stadium	Bangkok, Thailand	TKO	2	—N/a
2013-02-07	Lost	(Thailand) Petchboonchu FA Group	Rajadamnern Stadium	Bangkok, Thailand	Decision	5	3:00
2013-01-04	Win	(Thailand) Fahmeechai FA Group		Bangkok, Thailand	KO	2	—N/a
2012-11-12	Lost	(Thailand) Nong-O Kaiyanghadaogym	Lumpinee Stadium	Bangkok, Thailand	Decision	5	3:00
2012-10-04	Win	(Thailand) Sittisak Petpayathai	Rajadamnern Stadium	Bangkok, Thailand	TKO (Knees)	4	
2012-08-07	Lost	(Thailand) Jomthong Chuwattana	Lumpinee Stadium	Bangkok, Thailand	TKO	3	—N/a
2012-07-13	Win	(Thailand) Yodtuantong Petchyindeeacademy		Bangkok, Thailand	Decision	5	3:00
2012-05-22	Win	(Thailand) Tuantong Pumphanmuang		Bangkok, Thailand	Decision	5	3:00
2012-04-30	Lost	(Thailand) Saeksan Or. Kwanmuang	Lumpinee Stadium	Bangkok, Thailand	Decision	5	3:00
2012-03-09	Lost	(Thailand) Saeksan Or. Kwanmuang	Lumpinee Stadium	Thailand	Decision	5	3:00
2012-02-08	Win	(Thailand) Lekkla Thanasuranakorn	Wankingthong, Rajadamnern Stadium	Bangkok, Thailand	KO	3	
2011-12-31	Win	(Thailand) Yuttachai Pran26		Thailand	Decision	5	3:00
2011-12-09	Win	(Thailand) Yodpanomrung S.B.P. Carnetwork		Thailand	Decision	5	3:00
2011-11-09	Lost	(Thailand) Petpanomrung Kiatmuu9	Daprungprabaht Fights, Rajadamnern Stadium	Bangkok, Thailand	Decision	5	3:00
2011-10-14	Win	(Thailand) Rungpetch Gaiyang 5 Daow		Bangkok, Thailand	Decision	5	3:00
2011-09-16	Win	(Thailand) Duangpikart Kor.Sapaotong		Bangkok, Thailand	TKO	3	—N/a
2011-08-19	Lost	(Thailand) Pornsawan Lookprabaht		Thailand	Decision	5	3:00
2011-07-26	Win	(Thailand) Yodwicha Por Boonsit		Thailand	Decision	5	3:00
2011-07-01	Win	(Thailand) Kangwallek Petchyindee		Thailand	Decision	5	3:00
2011-06-01	Win	(Thailand) Mapichit Sitsongpeenong		Thailand	Decision	5	3:00
2011-04-29	Lost	(Thailand) Yodkhunpon Sitmonchai		Thailand	TKO	2	—N/a
2011-03-25	Win	(Thailand) Eakmongkol Gaiyang5DaowGym		Bangkok, Thailand	Decision	5	3:00
2011-02-25	Win	(Thailand) Eakmongkol Gaiyang5DaowGym		Bangkok, Thailand	Decision	5	3:00
2011-01-??	Win	(Thailand) Pradej Lookklongjan		Thailand	Decision	5	3:00
2010-08-24	Loss	(Thailand) Yodwicha Por Boonsit		Thailand	Decision	5	3:00
2009-09-01	Loss	(Thailand) Wanphichit RifloniaSauna	Petchyindee, Lumpinee Stadium	Bangkok, Thailand	Decision	5	3:00
2008-09-04	Loss	(Thailand) Fonluang Sitboonmee	Daorungprabat, Rajadamnern Stadium	Bangkok, Thailand	Decision	5	3:00
Legend: Win Loss Draw/No contest Notes

Amateur Muay Thai record
Date	Result	Opponent	Event	Location	Method	Round	Time
2014-05-09	Win	(Russia) Timur Ineshin	2014 IFMA World Championships, Final	Langkawi, Malaysia	TKO	3	—N/a
Wins 2014 IFMA World Championships (-71 kg) Gold Medal.
2014-05-06	Win	(Belarus) Farkhad Ahkmejanov	2014 IFMA World Championships, Quarter Final	Langkawi, Malaysia	KO	1	—N/a
2014-05-04	Win	(Ukraine) Alim Nabiev	2014 IFMA World Championships, 1/8 Final	Langkawi, Malaysia	Decision	3	3:00
Legend: Win Loss Draw/No contest Notes

== See also ==
- List of male kickboxers
