= Lekkla Thanasuranakorn =

Thai Muay Thai fighter

- Born: Uthen Chanaworn; January 2, 1991 (age 35); Ban Khwao district, Chaiyaphum province, Thailand
- Other names: Lekka Chanavon
- Height: 170 cm (5 ft 7 in)
- Weight: 56 kg (123 lb; 8.8 st)
- Division: Mini Flyweight; Light Flyweight; Flyweight; Super Flyweight; Bantamweight; Super Bantamweight; Featherweight
- Stance: Orthodox
- Fighting out of: Nakhon Ratchasima province, Thailand
- Team: Wor.Petchpoon; Thanasuranakorn
- Trainer: Kompayak Sit Danchai; Hansuk Prasathinpanomrung

Other information
- Boxing record from BoxRec

Uthen Chanaworn (อุเทน ชนาวรณ์), known professionally as Lekkla Thanasuranakorn (เหล็กกล้า ธนสุรนคร) is a retired Thai Muay Thai fighter.

== Biography and career ==
Lekkla started training in Muay Thai at the age of 10 in his native province of Chaiyaphum alongside his friends and brother. At the age of 17 he moved to the Thanasuranakorn camp in order to compete at the highest level in Bangkok. Lekkla defeated Petchboonchu Boplanboonchu on July 14, 2006, to catpure the Thailand 105 lbs title.

Lekkla obtained the best results in his career during between October 2008 and October 2009, a period which saw him win 10 fights in a row. On December 16, 2008, Lekkla defeated Liampetch Sitboonmee by second-round technical knockout on Phetsuphaphan fights at the Lumpinee Stadium. For his next fight he was scheduled to face Petchthaksin Sor.Sommai at the Rajadamnern Stadium on January 12, 2009. He won the fight by decision. Lekkla became the Lumpinee Stadium Bantamweight Champion on July 21, 2009, when he defeated Petchsiri Por.Siripong by decision.

After defeating Kangwanlek Petchyindee by decision on September 1, 2009, Lekkla was scheduled to face Rungphet Wor.Sangprapai on October 23, 2009, at the Lumpinee Stadium for the Petchpiya promotion. He won the fight by decision.

Lekkla's winning streak ended on December 8, 2009, when he was defeated by Sam-A Gaiyanghadao in a Lumpinee Stadium Super Bantamweight title bout. For his results during the year, Lekkla was elected as the 2009 Lumpinee Stadium Fighter of the Year by the stadium officials.

After retiring from competition in Thailand, Lekkla moved to Australia and became a Muay Thai trainer. He teaches at the All Styles Gym Ipswich and keeps competing both in Muay Thai and boxing regularly.

On September 19, 2025, Lekkla faced Jaga Chan at Eruption Muay Thai 25. He lost the fight by unanimous decision.

== Titles and accomplishments ==
- Lumpinee Stadium
  - 2009 Lumpinee Stadium Bantamweight (118 lbs) Champion
  - 2009 Lumpinee Stadium Fighter of the Year
- Professional Boxing Association of Thailand (PAT)
  - 2006 Thailand Mini Flyweight (105 lbs) Champion

== Fight record ==
Muay Thai Record
85 Wins, 35 Losses, 3 Draws
| Date | Result | Opponent | Event | Location | Method | Round | Time |
| 2025-09-19 | Loss | (Australia) Jaga Chan | Eruption Muay Thai 25 | Brisbane, Australia | Decision (Unanimous) | 3 | 3:00 |
| 2024-07-13 | Loss | (Australia) Josh King | MTL 11 | Gold Coast, Australia | Decision (Unanimous) | 3 | 3:00 |
| 2024-04-28 | Win | (Australia) Nathan Jones Jnr | MTL 10 | Gold Coast, Australia | Decision (Split) | 3 | 3:00 |
| 2016-12-24 | Draw | (Thailand) Sankeng Sor.Tor Lekphuket | MAX Muay Thai | Pattaya, Thailand | Decision | 3 | 3:00 |
| 2016-10-07 | Win | (Thailand) Payaklamphong Somsakkorsang | MAX Muay Thai | Pattaya, Thailand | KO (Elbow) | 2 | |
| 2012-11-10 | Loss | (Thailand) Yodkhunpon Sitmonchai | Ladprao Stadium | Bangkok, Thailand | Decision | 5 | 3:00 |
| 2012-04-17 | Loss | (Thailand) Kaimukkao Por.Thairongruangkamai | Petchpiya, Lumpinee Stadium | Bangkok, Thailand | Decision | 5 | 3:00 |
| 2012-02-08 | Loss | (Thailand) Thongchai Sitthongsak | Wankingthong, Rajadamnern Stadium | Bangkok, Thailand | KO | 3 | |
| 2012-01-12 | Loss | (Thailand) Pokaew Fonjangchonburi | Rajadamnern Stadium | Bangkok, Thailand | Decision | 5 | 3:00 |
| 2011-09-09 | Loss | (Thailand) Pokaew Fonjangchonburi | Lumpinee Stadium | Bangkok, Thailand | Decision | 5 | 3:00 |
| 2011-08-02 | Loss | (Thailand) Sam-A Gaiyanghadao | Phetsupaphan, Lumpinee Stadium | Bangkok, Thailand | Decision | 5 | 3:00 |
| 2011-07-08 | Win | (Thailand) Wuttidet Lukprabat | Daorungprabat, Lumpinee Stadium | Bangkok, Thailand | KO | 2 | |
| 2011-06-09 | Loss | (Thailand) Wuttidet Lukprabat | Daorungprabat, Rajadamnern Stadium | Bangkok, Thailand | Decision | 5 | 3:00 |
| 2011-04-26 | Win | (Thailand) Fasatharn Kor.Saphaothong | Petchpiya, Lumpinee Stadium | Bangkok, Thailand | Decision | 5 | 3:00 |
| 2011-02-02 | Win | (Thailand) Palangtip Sor.Jor.Montree | Daorungprabat, Rajadamnern Stadium | Bangkok, Thailand | Decision | 5 | 3:00 |
| 2010-11-16 | Win | (Thailand) Tingthong Sangsawangphanpla | Sangsawangphanpla, Lumpinee Stadium | Bangkok, Thailand | Decision | 5 | 3:00 |
| 2010-09-29 | Win | (Thailand) Fasatharn Kor.Sapaothong | Wanmitchai, Rajadamnern Stadium | Bangkok, Thailand | Decision | 5 | 3:00 |
| 2010-08-14 | Win | (Thailand) Saiduan Sit Or. | Omnoi Stadium | Samut Sakhon, Thailand | Decision | 5 | 3:00 |
| 2010-06-30 | Loss | (Thailand) Phalangthip Sor.Jor. Montri | Bangrachan, Rajadamnern Stadium | Bangkok, Thailand | Decision | 5 | 3:00 |
| 2010-03-25 | Loss | (Thailand) Manasak Narupai | Yodwanpaded, Rajadamnern Stadium | Bangkok, Thailand | Decision | 5 | 3:00 |
| 2010-02-09 | Loss | (Thailand) Kongsak Sitboonmee | Lumpinee Stadium | Bangkok, Thailand | Decision | 5 | 3:00 |
| 2010-01-08 | Loss | (Thailand) Rungruanglek Lukprabat | Lumpinee Stadium | Bangkok, Thailand | Decision | 5 | 3:00 |
| 2009-12-08 | Loss | (Thailand) Sam-A Gaiyanghadao | Lumpini Champion Krikkrai, Lumpinee Stadium 53rd Anniversary | Bangkok, Thailand | Decision | 5 | 3:00 |
For the Lumpinee Stadium Super Bantamweight (122 lbs) title.
| 2009-10-23 | Win | (Thailand) Rungphet Wor.Sangprapai | Petchpiya, Lumpinee Stadium | Bangkok, Thailand | Decision | 5 | 3:00 |
| 2009-09-01 | Win | (Thailand) Kangwanlek Petchyindee | Petchyindee, Lumpinee Stadium | Bangkok, Thailand | Decision | 5 | 3:00 |
| 2009-07-21 | Win | (Thailand) Petchsiri Por.Siripong | Paironan Lumpinee Stadium | Bangkok, Thailand | Decision | 5 | 3:00 |
Wins the vacant Lumpinee Stadium Bantamweight (118 lbs) title.
| 2009-06-02 | Win | (Thailand) Prab Kaiyanghadaogym | Petchpiya, Lumpinee Stadium | Bangkok, Thailand | KO | 2 | |
| 2009-03-13 | Win | (Thailand) Rungphet Wor.Sangprapai | Phetsuphapan, Lumpinee Stadium | Bangkok, Thailand | Decision | 5 | 3:00 |
| 2009-02-03 | Win | (Thailand) Duangpichit Aor.Siripon | Phumpanmuang, Lumpinee Stadium | Bangkok, Thailand | Decision | 5 | 3:00 |
| 2009-01-12 | Win | (Thailand) Petchthaksin Sor.Sommai | Sor.Sommai, Rajadamnern Stadium | Bangkok, Thailand | Decision | 5 | 3:00 |
| 2008-12-16 | Win | (Thailand) Liampetch Sitboonmee | Phetsuphaphan, Lumpinee Stadium | Bangkok, Thailand | TKO | 3 | |
| 2008-11-18 | Win | (Thailand) Itthirit Phetchaophraya | Praianan, Lumpinee Stadium | Bangkok, Thailand | Decision | 5 | 3:00 |
| 2008-10-24 | Win | (Thailand) Phetmai Chor.Sangprapai | Praianan, Lumpinee Stadium | Bangkok, Thailand | Decision | 5 | 3:00 |
| 2008-09-17 | Loss | (Thailand) Petchsiri Por.Siripong | Kiatsingnoi Rajadamnern Stadium | Bangkok, Thailand | Decision | 5 | 3:00 |
| 2008-08-13 | Win | (Thailand) Kaotam Lookprabaht | Daorungprabat, Rajadamnern Stadium | Bangkok, Thailand | Decision | 5 | 3:00 |
| 2008-07-02 | Loss | (Thailand) Liampetch Sitboonmee | DaorungprabatRajadamnern Stadium | Bangkok, Thailand | Decision | 5 | 3:00 |
| 2007-11-16 | Win | (Thailand) Prab Rifloniersauna | Wanboonya, Lumpinee Stadium | Bangkok, Thailand | Decision | 5 | 3:00 |
| 2007-04-06 | Loss | (Thailand) Yodpetchaek Simanarong | Phetsuphaphan, Lumpinee Stadium | Bangkok, Thailand | Decision | 5 | 3:00 |
| 2007-01-05 | Loss | (Thailand) Suwitlek Kor.Saphaothong | Petchyindee, Lumpinee Stadium | Bangkok, Thailand | Decision | 5 | 3:00 |
| 2006-11-17 | Win | (Thailand) Apidet Sor.Sommai | Wanboonya, Lumpinee Stadium | Bangkok, Thailand | Decision | 5 | 3:00 |
| 2006-10-06 | Loss | (Thailand) Pongsiri Por.Siripong | EminentAir, Lumpinee Stadium | Bangkok, Thailand | Decision | 5 | 3:00 |
| 2006-07-14 | Win | (Thailand) Petchboonchu Boplanboonchu | Petchpiya, Lumpinee Stadium | Bangkok, Thailand | Decision | 5 | 3:00 |
Wins Thailand Mini Flyweight (105 lbs) title.
| 2006-04-25 | Loss | (Thailand) Petchboonchu Boplanboonchu | Petchpiya, Lumpinee Stadium | Bangkok, Thailand | Decision | 5 | 3:00 |
For the Thailand Mini Flyweight (105 lbs) title.
| 2006-02-17 | Win | (Thailand) Klaasuek Meenayothin | Petchpiya, Lumpinee Stadium | Bangkok, Thailand | KO | 4 | |
| 2005-12-30 | Win | (Thailand) Prinyachart Sitkamnanchaliew | Petchyindee, Lumpinee Stadium | Bangkok, Thailand | Decision | 5 | 3:00 |
| 2005-11-25 | Loss | (Thailand) Jenrob Sakhomseel | Petchyindee, Lumpinee Stadium | Bangkok, Thailand | Decision | 5 | 3:00 |
| 2005-10-12 | Win | (Thailand) Pornchailek Lukphrabat | Daorungprabat, Rajadamnern Stadium | Bangkok, Thailand | Decision | 5 | 3:00 |
| 2005-08-10 | Win | (Thailand) Petchboonchu Boplanboonchu | Wan MuayThai, Rajadamnern Stadium | Thailand | Decision | 5 | 3:00 |
| 2005-05-31 | Loss | (Thailand) Yodpoj Sor.Skawarat | Petchyindee, Lumpinee Stadium | Bangkok, Thailand | Decision | 5 | 3:00 |
| 2005-03-04 | Win | (Thailand) Petchboonchu Boplanboonchu | Petchyindee, Lumpinee Stadium | Thailand | Decision | 5 | 3:00 |
Legend: Win Loss Draw/No contest Notes
