= Rittewada Petchyindee Academy =

Muay Thai fighter

- Born: Thanakrit Sitthikul; June 15, 1996 (age 30); Surin, Thailand
- Other names: Rittewada Sor Nipaporn (ฤทธิเทวดา ส.นิภาพร); Rittewada Sithikul (ฤทธิเทวดา สิทธิกุล); Littewada
- Nickname: The Somtam Angel
- Height: 180 cm (5 ft 11 in)
- Division: Super Lightweight; Welterweight
- Reach: 188 cm (74 in)
- Style: Muay Thai (Muay Femur)
- Stance: Southpaw
- Fighting out of: Bangkok, Thailand
- Team: Petchyindee Academy (2021-Present); Sitthikul Sor Nipaporn gym (2005-2021)

Kickboxing record
- Total: 108
- Wins: 81
- Losses: 22
- Draws: 5

Thanakrit Sitthikul (born June 15, 1996), known professionally as Rittewada Petchyindee Academy (Thai: ฤทธิ์เทวดา เพชรยินดีอะคาเดมี) is a Muay Thai fighter and amateur boxer. He is a former Lumpinee Stadium Super Lightweight Champion and won the 2023 Rajadamnern World Series Welterweight Tournament.

== Career ==
On October 13, 2015, Rittewada faced Manasak Sor.Jor.Lekmuangnon at the Lumpinee Stadium for the Phumphanmuang promotion. He won the fight by decision.

Rittewada faced Manasak Sor.Jor.Lekmuangnon in the Buriram province on January 22, 2016. He lost the fight by referee stoppage in the last round of the fight.

== Titles and accomplishments ==
- Rajadamnern Stadium
  - 2023 Rajadamnern World Series Welterweight (147 lbs) Tournament Winner
  - 2023 Rajadamnern World Series MVP
  - 2024 Rajadamnern World Series Super Welterweight (154 lbs) Tournament Runner-up
- Lumpinee Stadium
  - 2017 Lumpinee Stadium Super Lightweight (140 lbs) Champion
- World Muay Thai Council
  - 2016 WMC World Super Lightweight (140 lbs) Champion
- Channel 7 Boxing Stadium
  - 2014 Channel 7 Boxing Stadium Fighter of the Year
  - 2014 Channel 7 Boxing Stadium Super Lightweight (140 lbs) Champion
  - 2014 Channel 7 Boxing Stadium Fight of the Year (vs. Yodpanomrung Jitmuangnon)

== Fight record ==
81 Wins, 22 Losses
Date	Result	Opponent	Event	Location	Method	Round	Time
2025-12-27	Win	(Russia) Aleksei Ulianov	Rajadamnern World Series	Bangkok, Thailand	TKO (Doctor stoppage)	3	1:15
2025-11-22	Win	(Thailand) Kongthailand Kiatnavy	Rajadamnern World Series	Bangkok, Thailand	Decision (Unanimous)	3	3:00
2025-09-20	Win	(United Kingdom) Jackson Barkhouse	Rajadamnern World Series	Bangkok, Thailand	KO (Straight to the body)	1	1:33
2025-07-26	Win	(Thailand) Wanchalerm Uddonmuang	Rajadamnern World Series	Bangkok, Thailand	TKO (Elbows)	2	1:26
2025-05-17	Win	(China) Gong Yihang	Rajadamnern World Series	Bangkok, Thailand	TKO (Doctor stoppage)	1	0:12
2024-12-14	Loss	(Dominican Republic) Dani Rodriguez	Rajadamnern World Series - Final	Bangkok, Thailand	Decision (Unanimous)	5	3:00
For the 2024 Rajadamnern World Series Super Welterweight (154 lbs) title.
2024-11-09	Win	(Thailand) Thananchai Sitsongpeenong	Rajadamnern World Series - Final 4	Bangkok, Thailand	Decision (Unanimous)	3	3:00
2024-10-05	Win	(Iran) Ali Samet	Rajadamnern World Series - Group Stage	Bangkok, Thailand	KO (Elbow)	2	0:51
2024-08-31	Win	(Thailand) Petchmai SorKor.Lektaweewattana	Rajadamnern World Series - Group Stage	Bangkok, Thailand	Decision (Unanimous)	3	3:00
2024-07-27	Win	(Azerbaijan) Ruslan Naghiyev	Rajadamnern World Series - Group Stage	Bangkok, Thailand	KO (Right hook)	1	1:40
2023-10-07	Win	(Thailand) Hercules Wor.Jakrawut	Rajadamnern World Series - Final	Bangkok, Thailand	TKO (Elbow)	3	
Wins the 2023 Rajadamnern World Series Welterweight (147 lbs) title.
2023-09-02	Win	(Thailand) Saenpon Sor.Sommai	Rajadamnern World Series - Final 4	Bangkok, Thailand	KO (Elbow)	1	
2023-07-29	Win	(Uzbekistan) Sherzod Gaybulloev	Rajadamnern World Series - Group Stage	Bangkok, Thailand	TKO (Punches + elbows)	2	
2023-06-24	Win	(Thailand) Yodkhunpon Sitmonchai	Rajadamnern World Series - Group Stage	Bangkok, Thailand	Decision (Unanimous)	3	3:00
2023-05-20	Win	(Ukraine) Sergey Kulyaba	Rajadamnern World Series - Group Stage	Bangkok, Thailand	TKO (Doctor stoppage/cut)	2	2:39
2023-03-11	Win	(Italy) Alessio Malatesta	RWS + Petchyindee, Rajadamnern Stadium	Bangkok, Thailand	Decision (Unanimous)	3	3:00
2022-12-09	Loss	(Portugal) Fabio VenumMuaythai	Rajadamnern World Series	Bangkok, Thailand	KO (Punches + high kick)	1	2:51
2022-08-26	Loss	(Thailand) Saemapetch Fairtex	ONE 160: Ok vs. Lee 2	Kallang, Singapore	KO (Left cross)	2	1:36
2021-11-12	Win	(Thailand) Saemapetch Fairtex	ONE Championship: NextGen II	Kallang, Singapore	TKO (Doctor stop./cut)	2	2:10
2021-03-14	Loss	(Thailand) Ferrari Fairtex	Channel 7 Boxing Stadium	Bangkok, Thailand	Decision	5	3:00
2020-12-18	Win	(Brazil) Lobo PhuketFightClub	Suk Singmawin	Songkhla, Thailand	KO (left elbow)	2	
2020-09-20	Win	(Turkey) Ömer Semet	Muay Thai Super Champ	Bangkok, Thailand	KO (Body Kick)	1	
2020-08-02	Win	(Brazil) Danilo Reis	Muay Thai Super Champ	Bangkok, Thailand	TKO (Doctor stop./Elbow)	2	
2019-11-30	Win	(China) Hu Zheng	Wu Lin Feng 2019: WLF -67kg World Cup 2019-2020 6th Group Stage	Zhengzhou, China	Decision (Unanimous)	3	3:00
2018-04-10	Loss	(Thailand) Rambo Pet.Por.Tor.Or	Kiatpetch Super Fight Roadshow + Sawansangmanja	Khon Kaen, Thailand	Decision	5	3:00
2018-02-16	Loss	(Thailand) Chujaroen Dabransarakarm	Muaythai Kiatphet Superfight	Thailand	Decision	5	3:00
2018-01-09	Win	(Thailand) Nontakit Tor.Morsi	Lumpinee Stadium	Thailand	TKO (Low kicks)	3	
2017-11-07	Win	(Thailand) Nontakit Tor.Morsi	Lumpinee Stadium	Thailand	KO (Elbow)	3	
Wins the vacant Lumpinee Stadium Super Lightweight (140 lbs) title.
2017-09-05	Draw	(Thailand) Nontakit Tor.Morsi	Lumpinee Stadium	Thailand	Decision	5	3:00
For the vacant Lumpinee Stadium Super Lightweight (140 lbs) title.
2017-08-12	Loss	(Thailand) Chujaroen Dabransarakarm	Lumpinee Stadium	Bangkok, Thailand	Decision	5	3:00
2017-07-17	Loss	(Thailand) Chujaroen Dabransarakarm	Lumpinee Stadium	Bangkok, Thailand	Decision	5	3:00
2017-06-29	Win	(France) Morgan Adrar	Best Of Siam XI	France	TKO (Leg injury)	2	
2017-06-09	Win	(Thailand) Thaksinlek Kiatniwat	Lumpinee Stadium	Bangkok, Thailand	KO (Right hook)	3	
2017-05-05	Loss	(Thailand) Chujaroen Dabransarakarm	Lumpinee Stadium	Bangkok, Thailand	Decision	5	3:00
2017-03-07	Loss	(Thailand) Yodpanomrung Jitmuangnon	Lumpinee Stadium	Bangkok, Thailand	Decision	5	3:00
For Thailand Super Lightweight (140 lbs) title.
2017-02-11	Win	(Thailand) Nontakit Tor.Morsi	Lumpinee Stadium	Bangkok, Thailand	Decision	5	3:00
2017-01-24	Win	(Thailand) Nontakit Tor.Morsi	Lumpinee Stadium	Bangkok, Thailand	Decision	5	3:00
2016-10-04	Win	(Thailand) Chujaroen Dabransarakarm	Lumpinee Stadium	Thailand	Decision	5	3:00
2016-07-31	Loss	(Thailand) Yodpanomrung Jitmuangnon	Channel 7 Boxing Stadium	Bangkok, Thailand	Decision	5	3:00
Loses the Channel 7 Boxing Stadium Super Lightweight (140 lbs) title.
2016-07-01	Loss	(Thailand) Manasak Sor.Jor.Lekmuangnon	80th Anniversary Commemoration Stadium	Nakhon Ratchasima Province, Thailand	Decision	5	3:00
2016-06-03	Loss	(Thailand) Yodpanomrung Jitmuangnon	Lumpinee Stadium	Bangkok, Thailand	Decision	5	3:00
Loses the WMC World Super Lightweight (140 lbs) title.
2016-04-29	Win	(Thailand) Yodwicha Por Boonsit	Ruamphonkhonpadriew Fights, Lumpini Stadium	Bangkok, Thailand	Decision	5	3:00
Wins the WMC World Super Lightweight (140 lbs) title.
2016-04-06	Win	(Thailand) Saensatharn P.K. Saenchai Muaythaigym		Chiang Mai, Thailand	KO	4	
2016-03-07	Win	(Thailand) Yodpanomrung Jitmuangnon		Thailand	Decision	5	3:00
2016-02-20	Win	(Thailand) Pakorn PKSaenchaimuaythaigym	Siam Warriors	Ireland	Decision	5	3:00
2016-01-22	Loss	(Thailand) Manasak Sor.Jor.Lekmuangnon		Buriram, Thailand	TKO (Referee stoppage)	5	
2015-12-12	Win	(Thailand) Saensatharn P.K. Saenchai Muaythaigym		Roi Et Province, Thailand	Decision	5	3:00
2015-11-10	Win	(Thailand) Yodwicha Por Boonsit	Petkiatpet Fights, Lumpini Stadium	Bangkok, Thailand	Decision	5	3:00
2015-10-13	Win	(Thailand) Manasak Sor.Jor.Lekmuangnon	Lumpinee Stadium	Bangkok, Thailand	Decision	5	3:00
2015-09-12	Win	(Italy) Fabio Di Marco	The Circle	Spain	Decision	5	3:00
2015-07-29	Win	(Thailand) Por.Tor.Thor. Petchrungruang		Songkla, Thailand	Decision	5	3:00
2015-06-05	Loss	(Thailand) Yodpanomrung Jitmuangnon	Lumpinee Stadium	Bangkok, Thailand	TKO (Knees)	4	
2015-04-28	Win	(Thailand) Saksongkarm Popthirathum		Thailand	Decision	5	3:00
2015-02-27	Win	(Thailand) Simanoot Sor.Sarinya		Thailand	KO (Elbow)	3	
2014-11-16	Win	(Thailand) Saksongkarm Popthirathum	Channel 7 Boxing Stadium	Bangkok, Thailand	Decision	5	3:00
2014-09-21	Loss	(Thailand) Yodpanomrung Jitmuangnon	Channel 7 Boxing Stadium	Bangkok, Thailand	Decision	5	3:00
2014-07-27	Win	(Thailand) Destar Chengsimeewgym	Channel 7 Boxing Stadium	Bangkok, Thailand	KO (Elbow)	2	
Wins the Channel 7 Boxing Stadium Super Lightweight (140 lbs) title.
2014-06-04	Win	(Thailand) Simanoot Sor.Sarinya		Thailand	Decision	5	3:00
2014-05-16	Win	(Thailand) Saksongkram Popthiratham	Channel 7 Boxing Stadium	Bangkok, Thailand	Decision	5	3:00
2013-12-12	Win	(Thailand) Palangnum Lukmathawan		Surin province, Thailand	Decision	5	3:00
2013-09-24	Win	(Thailand) Petcharun Petchsuphanphan		Surin province, Thailand	Decision	5	3:00
2013-06-22	Win	(Thailand) Suayngam Sor.Phumphanmuang		Roi Et province, Thailand	Decision	5	3:00
2013-04-26	Loss	(Thailand) Pongsiri Por.Siripong		Thailand	Decision	5	3:00
2012-05-02	Loss	(Thailand) Bagkjo Torjinmaprayun	Rajadamnern Stadium	Bangkok, Thailand	KO (Right Cross)	2	
2012-03-28	Loss	(Thailand) Kiatisak Sitaudpibun	Rajadamnern Stadium	Bangkok, Thailand	Decision	5	3:00
2011-12-29	Loss	(Thailand) Mondam Sor.Weerapon	Wanmeechai, Rajadamnern Stadium	Bangkok, Thailand	KO	4	
2011-07-29	Loss	(Thailand) Songkom Sakhomsin	Lumpinee Stadium	Bangkok, Thailand	TKO	2	
2011-04-26	Loss	(Thailand) Petsakon F.A.Group	Lumpinee Stadium	Bangkok, Thailand	Decision	5	3:00
2011-03-25	Win	(Thailand) Kotee Sitnumkabuan	Lumpinee Stadium	Bangkok, Thailand	Decision	5	3:00
2010-12-29	Win	(Thailand) Superlek Kiatmuu9	Lumpinee Stadium	Bangkok, Thailand	Decision	5	3:00
2010-10-23	Win	(Thailand) ET PTTThongtawee	Omnoi Stadium	Samut Sakhon, Thailand	Decision	5	3:00
2010-09-17	Win	(Thailand) Vittayalek Sor.Weeraphol	Lumpinee Stadium	Bangkok, Thailand	Decision	5	3:00
2010-08-24	Win	(Thailand) Petchkiansa Sor.Weeraphol	Lumpinee Stadium	Bangkok, Thailand	Decision	5	3:00
2010-07-13	Loss	(Thailand) Phet Lookmakarmwan	Lumpinee Stadium	Bangkok, Thailand	Decision	5	3:00
2010-06-19	Loss	(Thailand) Phet Lookmakarmwan	Lumpinee Stadium	Bangkok, Thailand	Decision	5	3:00
2009-10-23	Win	(Thailand) Klasayam Sor.Jor.Montree	Petchpiya, Lumpinee Stadium	Bangkok, Thailand	Decision	5	3:00
2009-09-11	Loss	(Thailand) Thaksinlek Sitprakaifa	Petchyindee, Lumpinee Stadium	Bangkok, Thailand	Decision	5	3:00
2009-08-07	Win	(Thailand) Wanchana Or.Boonchuay	Lumpinee Stadium	Thailand	Decision	5	3:00
2009-04-03	Win	(Thailand) Satanmuanglek Or.Satanmuang	Lumpinee Stadium	Thailand	Decision	5	3:00
2009-01-16	Loss	(Thailand) Bangpleenoi 96Penang	Lumpinee Stadium	Bangkok, Thailand	Decision	5	3:00
Legend: Win Loss Draw/No contest Notes
