= Chamuaktong Fightermuaythai =

Thai Muay Thai fighter

- Born: November 10, 1988 (age 37); Nakhon Si Thammarat, Thailand
- Other names: Chamuakthong Chor.Warachai (ฉมวกทอง ช.วราชัย); Chamuaktong Sor Yupinda (ฉมวกทอง ส.ยุพินดา); Chamuaktong Lookklongtun
- Height: 178 cm (5 ft 10 in)
- Weight: 66 kg (146 lb; 10 st)
- Division: Welterweight; Light welterweight
- Style: Muay Khao
- Stance: Orthodox
- Fighting out of: Bangkok, Thailand

Kickboxing record
- Total: 198
- Wins: 155
- Losses: 42
- Draws: 1

Chamuaktong Fightermuaythai (Thai: ฉมวกทอง ไฟต์เตอร์มวยไทย; born November 10, 1988), also known as Chamuaktong Sor Yupinda, is a retired professional Muay Thai fighter.

== Titles and accomplishments ==
- 2020 Siam Omnoi Stadium 147lbs Champion
- 2017 Rajadamnern Stadium 140lbs Champion
- 2016 Toyota Marathon Tournament Champion
- 2016 World Muay Thai Council 140lbs Champion
- 2013 Lumpinee Stadium 140 lbs Champion
- 2015 Lumpinee Stadium 140 lbs Champion (two defenses)

== Fight record ==
155 Wins, 42 Losses, 1 Draw
Date	Result	Opponent	Event	Location	Method	Round	Time
2024-03-30	Win	(Uganda) Award Bakashabaruhanga	8 Muay Thai YuenTin Muang Khon	Nakhon Si Thammarat province, Thailand	Decision	5	3:00
2022-08-05	Win	(Thailand) Teeradet Chor.Hapayak	Petchyindee Muaymanwansuk, Rangsit Stadium	Rangsit, Thailand	Decision	5	3:00
2022-03-03	Loss	(Thailand) Nuenglanlek Jitmuangnon	Petchyindee, Rajadamnern Stadium	Bangkok, Thailand	Decision	5	3:00
2021-12-02	Loss	(Thailand) Chujaroen Dabransarakarm	Petchyindee, Rangsit Stadium	Bangkok, Thailand	Decision	5	3:00
2021-10-21	Loss	(Thailand) Ratchasing RongrienKelaKorat	Petchyindee + Muay Thai Moradok Kon Thai	Buriram province, Thailand	Decision	5	3:00
2021-04-08	Loss	(Thailand) Panpayak Jitmuangnon	SuekMahakamMuayRuamPonKon Chana + Petchyindee	Songkhla Province, Thailand	Decision	5	3:00
2020-12-11	Win	(Thailand) Kaewkangwan Priwayo	True4U Muaymanwansuk, Rangsit Stadium	Rangsit, Thailand	Decision	5	3:00
2020-10-02	Loss	(Thailand) Capitan Petchyindee Academy	Rangsit Stadium	Rangsit, Thailand	Decision	5	3:00
2020-08-08	Win	(Thailand) Phonek Or.Kwanmuang	Siam Omnoi Stadium	Samut Sakhon Province, Thailand	Decision	5	3:00
Wins the Omnoi Stadium 147lbs Title.
2019-12-19	Win	(Thailand) Yodpanomrung Jitmuangnon	Rajadamnern Stadium	Bangkok, Thailand	Decision	5	3:00
2019-10-06	Win	(Japan) Yuki Masui	Suk Wanchai MuayThai Super Fight vol.6	Nagoya, Japan	Decision	5	3:00
2019-08-22	Loss	(Thailand) Panpayak Sitchefboontham	Rajadamnern Stadium	Bangkok, Thailand	Decision	5	3:00
Lost the Rajadamnern Stadium 140lbs Title.
2019-06-27	Win	(Thailand) Panpayak Sitchefboontham	Rajadamnern Stadium	Bangkok, Thailand	Decision	5	3:00
2019-05-28	Loss	(France) Rafi Bohic	Lumpinee Stadium	Bangkok, Thailand	TKO	5	
2019-02-16	Win	(England) Charlie Peters	ONE Championship: Clash of Legends	Bangkok, Thailand	Decision (Majority)	3	3:00
2018-10-10	Win	(Thailand) Yodpanomrung Jitmuangnon	Rajadamnern Stadium	Bangkok, Thailand	Decision	5	3:00
Defends the Rajadamnern Stadium 140lbs Title.
2018-09-15	Win	(Japan) Kaito	SHOOT BOXING2018 act.4	Tokyo, Japan	Ext.R Decision (Majority)	6	3:00
2018-08-29	Win	(Japan) Yukimitsu Takahashi	SUK WAN KINGTHONG Go to Raja	Tokyo, Japan	Decision (Unanimous)	5	3:00
2018-07-27	Win	(Netherlands) Brown Pinas	ONE Championship: Heroes of Honor	Manila, Philippines	Decision	3	3:00
2018-06-22	Win	(Australia) Jay Tonkin	Toyota Revo Championship	Thailand	TKO	4	
Defends WMC World 140lbs Title.
2018-05-26	Win	(France) Cedric Do	Topking World Series	Bangkok, Thailand	Decision	3	3:00
2017-12-29	Win	(Thailand) Yodpanomrung Jitmuangnon	Lumpinee Stadium	Bangkok, Thailand	Decision	5	3:00
2017-11-06	Win	(Thailand) Yodpanomrung Jitmuangnon	Rajadamnern Stadium	Bangkok, Thailand	Decision	5	3:00
Wins the Rajadamnern Stadium 140lbs Title.
2017-08-06	Win	(Japan) Tatsuya Ishii	Battle of Muay Thai 15	Tokyo, Japan	KO (Left knee)	1	1:07
Wins vacant WMC World 140lbs Title.
2017-06-05	Loss	(Thailand) Yodpanomrung Jitmuangnon	Rajadamnern Stadium	Bangkok, Thailand	Decision	5	3:00
2017-03-21	Loss	(Thailand) Chujaroen Dabransarakarm	Lumpinee Stadium	Bangkok, Thailand	Decision	5	3:00
2016-12-09	Win	(Thailand) Chujaroen Dabransarakarm	Lumpinee Stadium	Bangkok, Thailand	Decision	5	3:00
Defends the Lumpinee Stadium 140lbs Title.
2016-10-06	Win	(Thailand) Yodpanomrung Jitmuangnon	Rajadamnern Stadium	Bangkok, Thailand	Decision	5	3:00
2016-09-02	Win	(Thailand) Chujaroen Dabransarakarm	Lumpinee Stadium	Bangkok, Thailand	Decision	5	3:00
2016-07-29	Loss	(Thailand) Phetmorakot Petchyindee Academy	Toyota Hilux Revo Superchamp Tournament, Semi Finals	Tokyo, Japan	Decision	3	3:00
2016-07-29	Win	(Japan) Shoto Sato	Toyota Hilux Revo Superchamp Tournament, Quarter Finals	Tokyo, Japan	Decision	3	3:00
2016-06-24	Win	(Thailand) Dejrit Poptheeratham	Toyota Marathon, final	Bangkok, Thailand	Decision	3	3:00
Wins 2016 Toyota Marathon Tournament Title.
2016-06-24	Win	(France) Numa Decagny	Toyota Marathon, Semi final	Bangkok, Thailand	TKO (knees to the body)	2	
2016-06-24	Win	(Uzbekistan) Naimjon Tutaboev	Toyota Marathon, Quarter finals	Bangkok, Thailand	Decision	3	3:00
2016-06-10	Win	(Thailand) Petpanomrung Kiatmuu9	Wanweraphon Fight, Lumpinee Stadium	Bangkok, Thailand	Decision	5	3:00
Defends the Lumpinee Stadium 140lbs Title.
2016-04-07	Loss	(Thailand) Petpanomrung Kiatmuu9	Petwiset Fights, Rajadamnern Stadium	Bangkok, Thailand	Decision	5	3:00
2015-12-08	Win	(Thailand) Singdam Kiatmuu9	Lumpinee Stadium	Bangkok, Thailand	Decision	5	3:00
Wins the Lumpinee Stadium 140lbs Title.
2015-11-09	Loss	(Thailand) Yodpanomrung Jitmuangnon	Rajadamnern Stadium	Bangkok, Thailand	Decision	5	3:00
2015-10-13	Win	(Thailand) Satanfah Rachanon	Lumpinee Stadium	Bangkok, Thailand	Decision	5	3:00
2015-08-06	Draw	(Thailand) Yodpanomrung Jitmuangnon	Rajadamnern Stadium	Bangkok, Thailand	Decision	5	3:00
2015-06-11	Loss	(Thailand) Petchboonchu FA Group	Rajadamnern Stadium	Bangkok, Thailand	Decision	5	3:00
2015-04-02	Win	(Thailand) Nong-O Kaiyanghadaogym	Rajadamnern Stadium	Bangkok, Thailand	Decision	5	3:00
2014-09-10	Loss	(Thailand) Nong-O Kaiyanghadaogym	Rajadamnern Stadium	Bangkok, Thailand	Decision	5	3:00
2014-07-25	Loss	(Thailand) Petchboonchu FA Group	Toyota Marathon, final	Bangkok, Thailand	Decision	3	3:00
2014-07-25	Win	(Scotland) Craig Dickson	Toyota Marathon, Semi final	Bangkok, Thailand	TKO (knees to the body)	2	
2014-07-25	Win	(Italy) Emmanuele Corti	Toyota Marathon, Quarter final	Bangkok, Thailand	KO (Elbows)	1	
2014-06-	Loss	(Thailand) Saensatharn P.K. Saenchai Muaythaigym	Lumpinee Stadium	Bangkok, Thailand	Decision	5	3:00
Lost the Lumpinee Stadium and failed to capture Thailand 140lbs Title.
2014-03-30	Loss	(Thailand) Singdam Kiatmuu9	Charity Event for School	Songkhla, Southern Thailand	Decision	5	3:00
2014-01-07	Loss	(Thailand) Yodwicha Por Boonsit	Lumpinee Stadium	Bangkok, Thailand	Decision	5	3:00
For the Thailand Light Welterweight title (140 lbs).
2013-12-03	Win	(Thailand) Nong-O Kaiyanghadaogym	Lumpinee Stadium	Bangkok, Thailand	Decision	5	3:00
Wins the vacant Lumpinee Stadium 140lbs title.
2013-11-04	Win	(Thailand) Yodkhunpon Sitmonchai	Rajadamnern Stadium	Bangkok, Thailand	Decision	5	3:00
2013-10-11	Win	(Thailand) Nong-O Kaiyanghadaogym	Lumpinee Stadium	Bangkok, Thailand	Decision	5	3:00
2013-09-04	Loss	(Thailand) Singdam Kiatmuu9	Rajadamnern Stadium	Bangkok, Thailand	Decision	5	3:00
2013-08-03	Win	(Thailand) Petchboonchu FA Group	Rajadamnern Stadium	Bangkok, Thailand	Decision	5	3:00
2013-06-25	Win	(Thailand) Aranchai	Rajadamnern Stadium	Bangkok, Thailand	Decision	5	3:00
2013-02-15	Win	(Thailand) Angkarnlek ExcidiconGym	Weerapon, Lumpinee Stadium	Bangkok, Thailand	Decision	5	3:00
2010-12-29	Loss	(Thailand) Singdam Kiatmuu9	Rajadamnern Stadium	Bangkok, Thailand	Decision	5	3:00
2010-02-07	Loss	(Thailand) Sittisak Petpayathai	Channel 7 Boxing Stadium	Bangkok, Thailand	Decision	5	3:00
For the Channel 7 Boxing Stadium 130lbs title.
Legend: Win Loss Draw/No contest Notes
