= Rafi Bohic =

French professional Muay Thai fighter

- Born: Raphael Bohic; July 9, 1991 (age 35); Le Havre, France
- Other names: Rafi Singpatong (ราฟฟี่ สิงห์ป่าตอง)
- Height: 176 cm (5 ft 9 in)
- Division: Super Lightweight; Welterweight
- Style: Muay Thai (Muay Bouk)
- Stance: Orthodox
- Fighting out of: Phuket, Thailand
- Team: Singpatong
- Years active: c. 2012–present

Kickboxing record
- Total: 112
- Wins: 83
- By knockout: 37
- Losses: 28
- Draws: 1

Raphael Bohic (born July 9, 1991), known professionally as Rafi Bohic, is a French professional Muay Thai fighter. He is a former two-time Lumpinee Stadium Welterweight Champion, WBC MuayThai World Super Lightweight Champion, and WMC World Super Lightweight Champion.

== Muaythai career ==
Rafi discovered Muay Thai at 17 years old after a year of training in the French boxing discipline Savate. He moved to Thailand to the Singpatong gym in 2012 inspired by Damien Alamos.

Rafi Bohic won the WBC Muaythai Super Lightweight title with a decision win over Aranchai Kiatpatarphan during the Best of Siam 8 event.

Bohic won the Lumpini Welterweight belt for the first time in June 2017, with a decision win over Pongsiri P.K.Saenchaimuaythaigym. He was stripped of the title in July, as he was knocked out by Nontakrit Tor Morsi. Bohic would however reclaim the title five months later, after defeating Simanoot Sor Sarinya by decision.

He made his first title defense against Dylan Salvador, whom he beat by a fourth round KO.

Rafi successfully defended the Lumpini Stadium Welterweight title for the second time with a decision win over Petkanthas M-Uden in August 2018, and for the third time with a third round KO win over Thananchai Rachanon in October 2018.

Bohic beat Kongsak Saenchaimuaythaigym by a third round TKO, in November 2018. Rafi defeated Denuhatri by a third round KO in January 2019. He fought a rematch with Chujaroen Dabransarakarm in February 2019, but lost by decision. He was scheduled to fight Avatarn Tor Morsi in March 2019, a fight which he won by decision.

He successfully defended his Lumpini Stadium title for the fourth time with a fourth round knockout of Manachai in April 2019. Manachai was later suspended by Yokkao due to “questionable KO losses” and doubts surrounding “passion for the sport”.

After a successful title defense, Bohic would go on to win his next two fights. He first defeated Chamuaktong Fightermuaythai by a fifth round TKO in the Lumpini Stadium. It was followed up with a decision win over Yodpanomrung Jitmuangnon.

In 2019 Rafi signed with ONE Championship and announced he was aiming to challenge Nong-O Gaiyanghadao for the ONE Muay Thai Bantamweight title. Rafi Bohic was set to make his ONE Championship debut during ONE: Immortal Triumph, but was later replaced by Azize Hlali as Bohic had to pull out due to injury.

Bohic fought Sangmanee Sor Tienpo at the Yod Muay Thai Naikhanomton event in October 2019. His four fight winning streak was snapped, as he lost a decision. Rafi was scheduled to fight Yodlekpet Or. Pitisak at the Ruamponkon Prachin event in November 2019. He lost the fight by decision. He fought a rubber match with Chujaroen Dabransarakarm in December 2019, and lost the fight by decision.

Bohic was scheduled to fight at the AMMA event, against Pakorn PKSaenchaimuaythaigym. He won the fight by decision, and snapped a three fight losing streak.

He is scheduled to fight a rematch with Thananchai Rachanon for the vacant WBC Muaythai World Welterweight title in December 2020. The fight was cancelled as a result of the COVID-19 pandemic.

Bohic was scheduled to face Craig Coakley at RS Challenge on December 19, 2021.

Bohic was scheduled to face Azize Hlali at Nuit des Titans on March 5, 2022. On February 2, 2022, it was announced that Bohic had withdrawn from the fight due to injury.

== Titles and accomplishments ==
=== Muay Thai ===
- Lumpinee Stadium
  - 2017 Lumpinee Stadium Welterweight (147 lbs) Champion
  - 2017 Lumpinee Stadium Welterweight (147 lbs) Champion (4 defenses)
- World Boxing Council MuayThai
  - 2016 WBC World MuayThai Super Lightweight (140 lbs) Champion
- MAX Muay Thai
  - 2014 MAX Muay Thai World Welterweight (147 lbs) Champion
- World Muaythai Council
  - 2013 WMC World Super Lightweight (140 lbs) Champion

== Fight record ==
Muay Thai record
84 wins (37 (T)KOs), 28 losses, 1 draw, 1nNo contest
Date	Result	Opponent	Event	Location	Method	Round	Time
2026-02-19	Win	(Thailand) Faasai ChangthaiGym	Patong Fight Night	Phuket, Thailand	Decision	5	3:00
2024-06-28	Loss	(Thailand) Pakorn P.K. Saenchai Muaythaigym	ONE Friday Fights 68, Lumpinee Stadium	Bangkok, Thailand	KO (right cross)	1	2:15
2024-01-26	Loss	(Thailand) Yod-IQ Or.Pimolsri	ONE Friday Fights 49, Lumpinee Stadium	Bangkok, Thailand	Decision (unanimous)	3	3:00
2023-10-20	Loss	(Belarus) Antar Kacem	ONE Friday Fights 37, Lumpinee Stadium	Bangkok, Thailand	Decision (unanimous)	3	3:00
2023-07-21	NC	(Thailand) Kulabdam Sor.Jor.Piek-U-Thai	ONE Friday Fights 26, Lumpinee Stadium	Bangkok, Thailand	Doctor stoppage (eye poke)	1	
2023-04-07	Win	(Thailand) Tapaokaew Singmawynn	ONE Friday Fights 12, Lumpinee Stadium	Bangkok, Thailand	Decision (split)	3	3:00
2023-02-11	Win	(Thailand) Nonthachai Jitmuangnon	LWC Super Champ, Lumpinee Stadium	Bangkok, Thailand	Decision (unanimous)	5	3:00
2022-11-05	Loss	(United Kingdom) Sevket Cerkez	Roar Fighting Championship	London, England	Decision (unanimous)	5	3:00
For the vacant Roar FC World Welterweight (147 lbs) title.
2021-12-19	Win	(Republic of Ireland) Craig Coakley	RS Challenge	Lyon, France	Decision (split)	5	3:00
2021-07-10	Win	(Italy) Pasquale G Amoroso	Ring Side Gym Show	Dardilly, France	Decision	5	3:00
2020-02-23	Win	(Thailand) Pakorn PKSaenchaimuaythaigym	Authentic Mix Martial Arts	Phuket, Thailand	Decision	3	3:00
2019-12-06	Loss	(Thailand) Chujaroen Dabransarakarm	Lumpinee Stadium	Bangkok, Thailand	Decision	5	3:00
2019-11-07	Loss	(Thailand) Yodlekpet Or. Pitisak	Ruamponkon Prachin	Prachinburi, Thailand	Decision	5	3:00
2019-10-05	Loss	(Thailand) Sangmanee Sor Tienpo	Yod Muay Thai Naikhanomton	Buriram, Thailand	Decision	5	3:00
2019-07-26	Win	(Thailand) Yodpanomrung Jitmuangnon		Hatyai, Thailand	Decision	5	3:00
2019-05-28	Win	(Thailand) Chamuaktong Fightermuaythai	Lumpinee Stadium	Phuket, Thailand	TKO (low kicks)	5	
2019-04-30	Win	(Thailand) Manachai	Lumpinee Stadium	Bangkok, Thailand	KO	4	
Defends the Lumpinee Stadium Welterweight (147 lbs) title.
2019-03-30	Win	(Thailand) Avatar Tor.Morsri	Muaythai Singpatong	Phuket, Thailand	Decision	5	3:00
2019-02-05	Loss	(Thailand) Chujaroen Dabransarakarm	Lumpinee	Bangkok, Thailand	Decision	5	3:00
2019-01-05	Win	(Thailand) Denuhatri	Singpatong Saturday	Phuket, Thailand	KO	3	
2018-11-13	Win	(Thailand) Kongsak Saenchaimuaythaigym	Lumpinee Stadium	Bangkok, Thailand	TKO (low kicks)	3	
2018-10-12	Win	(Thailand) Thananchai Rachanon	All Star Muay-Thai	Aubervilliers, France	KO (low kicks)	3	
Defends the Lumpinee Stadium Welterweight (147 lbs) title.
2018-08-28	Win	(Thailand) Petkanthas M-Uden	Lumpinee Stadium	Bangkok, Thailand	Decision	5	3:00
Defends the Lumpinee Stadium Welterweight (147 lbs) title.
2018-07-29	Win	(Thailand) Taksila Chor. Haphayak	Blue Arena	Bangkok, Thailand	KO (elbow)	4	
2018-06-16	Win	(China) Han Zihao	Topking World Series	Surat Thani, Thailand	Decision	5	3:00
2018-05-22	Loss	(Thailand) Pongsiri P.K.Saenchaimuaythaigym	Lumpinee Stadium	Bangkok, Thailand	Decision	5	3:00
For the Phoenix FC Super Welterweight (154 lbs) title.
2018-04-08	Loss	(France) Bobo Sacko	Duel 3	Paris, France	Decision	5	3:00
2018-02-27	Win	(France) Dylan Salvador	Best of Siam XII	Bangkok, Thailand	KO (elbow)	4	
Defends the Lumpinee Stadium Welterweight (147 lbs) title.
2018-02-03	Win	(Thailand) Aekyuzang K Max Muaythai	Saturday Fight Night	Phuket, Thailand	KO	2	
2017-12-26	Win	(Thailand) Simanoot Sor Sarinya	Lumpinee Stadium	Bangkok, Thailand	Decision	5	3:00
Wins the vacant Lumpinee Stadium Welterweight (147 lbs) title.
2017-11-10	Win	(Thailand) Attachai Tor.Morsi	Lumpinee Stadium	Bangkok, Thailand	Decision	5	3:00
2017-09-10	Loss	(Thailand) Pongsiri P.K.Saenchaimuaythaigym	Lumpinee Stadium	Bangkok, Thailand	Decision	5	3:00
2017-07-18	Loss	(Thailand) Nontakrit Tor Morsi.	Lumpinee Stadium	Bangkok, Thailand	KO (liver kick)	3	
For the Thailand Welterweight (147 lbs) title. Rafi stripped from Lumpinee title due to KO loss.
2017-06-17	Win	(Thailand) Pongsiri P.K.Saenchaimuaythaigym	Lumpinee Stadium	Bangkok, Thailand	Decision	5	3:00
Wins the Lumpinee Stadium Welterweight (147 lbs) title.
2017-05-12	Win	(Thailand) Audnoi Kaoklaigym	Lumpinee Stadium	Bangkok, Thailand	KO (middle kick)	4	3:00
2017-04-04	Loss	(Thailand) Rambo Pet.Por.Tor.Or	Lumpinee Stadium	Bangkok, Thailand	Decision	5	3:00
2017-02-24	Win	(Thailand) Srimuangpai Amnatmuaythaigym	Lumpinee Stadium	Bangkok, Thailand	Decision	5	3:00
2017-01-22	Win	(Thailand) Srimuangpai Amnatmuaythaigym	o.To.Ko	Thailand	Decision	5	3:00
2016-12-10	Win	(Thailand) Chalamthong SitPanun	Lumpinee Stadium	Thailand	TKO (low kick)	2	
2016-10-29	Loss	(Thailand) Chujaroen Dabransarakarm	Best of Siam IX Lumpinee Stadium	Thailand	TKO	3	
2016-10-07	Loss	(Thailand) Pongsiri P.K.Saenchaimuaythaigym	Lumpinee Stadium	Bangkok, Thailand	Decision	5	3:00
2016-09-02	Loss	(Thailand) Pongsiri P.K.Saenchaimuaythaigym	Lumpinee Stadium	Bangkok, Thailand	Decision	5	3:00
For the Lumpinee Stadium Welterweight (147 lbs) title.
2016-08-05	Loss	(Thailand) Satanfah Rachanon	Kiatpetch Show	Thailand	Decision	5	3:00
2016-07-08	Win	(Thailand) Simanut Sor.Sirinya	Lumpinee Stadium	Bangkok, Thailand	Decision	5	3:00
2016-05-27	Win	(Thailand) Aranchai Kiatpatarphan	Best of Siam 8 Rajadamnern Stadium	Bangkok, Thailand	Decision	5	3:00
Won the WBC World MuayThai Super Lightweight (140 lbs) title.
2016-05-03	Win	(Thailand) Senkeng Kiatjaroenchai	Lumpinee Stadium	Bangkok, Thailand	KO (punches)	3	
2016-03-26	Loss	(Thailand) Sibmean Sitchefboontham	Omnoi Stadium	Samut Sakhon Province, Thailand	TKO	4	
For the Omnoi Stadium Welterweight (147 lbs) title.
2016-02-16	Loss	(Thailand) Faipa Sor.Nalongritt	Fooktiengroup Tournament	Thailand			
2015-12-29	Win	(Thailand) Inseetong Por.Phinaphat	Fooktiengroup Tournament	Thailand			
2015-10-31	Win	(Thailand) Dejteewada Sitikoon	Omnoi Stadium	Samut Sakhon Province, Thailand	KO	3	
2015-10-03	Win	(Thailand) Nawee Eaglemuaythai	Omnoi Stadium	Samut Sakhon Province, Thailand	KO	3	
2015-09-05	Win	(Thailand) Jaknalonglek Tor Silatchai	Omnoi Stadium	Samut Sakhon Province, Thailand	Decision	5	3:00
2015-08-01	Win	(Thailand) Jom Kitti	Rhino Invasion	Kuala Lumpur	Decision	5	3:00
2015-05-23	Win	(France) Jim Brazzale	Radikal Fight Night 3	France	Decision	5	3:00
2015-04-18	Loss	(France) Yannick Reine	Konateam Tournament, Final	France	Decision	5	3:00
2015-04-18	Win	(France) Anthony Defretin	Konateam Tournament, Semi Final	France	TKO	2	
2015-04-04	Win	(Thailand) Kong Samui Lukjaoporongtom	Thai Fight	France	Decision	5	3:00
2015-01-31	Win	(Thailand) Nakornsri EliteFightclub	Muaythai Fury	Phuket, Thailand	KO	1	
2015-01-31	Win	(Thailand) Kompetch Lukjaoma	Muaythai Fury	Phuket, Thailand	KO	1	
2014-12-29	Loss	(Thailand) Sarikadong	Petchbuncha Samui Stadium	Thailand	Decision	5	3:00
2014-12-07	Loss	(Thailand) Jingreedtong Seatranferry	Max Muay Thai Final Chapter	Thailand	Decision	5	3:00
2014-11-15	Win	(Thailand) Phiphatpong	Patong Boxing Stadium	Thailand	TKO	4	
2014-10-18	Win	(Thailand) Plabsek Sitkruseang	Lumpinee Stadium	Thailand	Decision	5	3:00
2014-09-19	Win	(Thailand) Fahmankol SItparnsak	Eminentair Fight	Thailand	Decision	5	3:00
2014-08-03	Win	(Thailand) Changpuek MUaythaiacademy	Max Muay Thai	Pattaya, Thailand	Decision	5	3:00
2014-06-07	Loss	(France) Jimmy Vienot	Gala du Phenix Muaythai 6	France	Decision	5	3:00
2014-03-15	Win	(Thailand) Wanassai	Suk Singpatong + Sitnumnoi	Phuket, Thailand	KO	1	
2014-02-16	Win	(China) Guo Dongwang	Max Muay Thai China	Zhengzhou, China	Decision	3	3:00
Wins the 2014 MAX Muay Thai Welterweight (147 lbs)) World Tournament.
2014-02-16	Win	(Thailand) Sangfa Silalai	Max Muay Thai China	Zhengzhou, China	Decision	3	3:00
2014-01-18	Win	(Thailand) Daowgpragai Sorsommai	Patong Boxing Stadium	Phuket, Thailand	KO	1	
2014-01-04	Win	(Thailand) Kangkenlek SBP Car Network	Patong Boxing Stadium	Phuket, Thailand	KO (left hook to the body)	2	
2013-12-05	Win	(Thailand) Rungrath Naratrikul	King's Birthday	Bangkok, Thailand	Decision	5	3:00
2013-11-16	Win	(Thailand) Seksan Tiger Muaythai	Patong Boxing Stadium	Phuket, Thailand	TKO (referee stoppage)	4	
2013-10-26	Draw	(Thailand) Rungrath Naratrikul	Patong Boxing Stadium	Phuket, Thailand	Decision	5	3:00
2013-09-13	Loss	(Thailand) Jacksiam SinbiMuaythai	Bangla Boxing Stadium	Phuket, Thailand	Decision	5	3:00
2013-07-26	Win	(Cambodia) Vung Noy	Khmer Fighter	Cambodia	Decision	5	3:00
2013-06-28	Loss	(Thailand) Saenchai	Muay Thai Warriors: Dabble in Chiang Mai	Chiang Mai, Thailand	Decision (unanimous)	5	3:00
2013-04-28	Win	(Uzbekistan) Anvar Boynazarov	9th Anniversary Bangla Boxing Stadium	Phuket, Thailand	TKO (doctor stoppage)	3	
Wins the WMC World Super Lightweight (140 lbs) title.
2013-04-05	Loss	(Thailand) Boo Sasiprapa	Muay Thai Warriors	Pattaya, Thailand	Decision	5	3:00
2013-03-13	Win	(Thailand) Sangsakda Phuket Topteam	King Of Muay Thai	Phuket, Thailand	TKO	4	
2012-12-26	Win	(Thailand) Taharnaek PatongBoxingGym	King Fight Of The Year	Phuket, Thailand	Decision	5	3:00
2012-12-26	Win	(Brazil) Victor Manop Gym	King Fight Of The Year	Phuket, Thailand	Decision	5	3:00
2012-12-26	Win	(Thailand) Chalamkraw RawaiMuaythai	King Fight Of The Year	Phuket, Thailand	Decision	5	3:00
2012-12-08	Win	(Thailand) DECGA	Lumpinee Stadium	Bangkok, Thailand	KO (knees)	5	
2012-11-14	Win	(Uzbekistan) Anvar Boynazarov	Bangla Boxing Stadium	Thailand	KO (straight to the body)	2	
2012-11-02	Win	(Thailand) Popeye JavienMuaythai	Bangla Boxing Stadium	Thailand	Decision	5	3:00
2012-10-07	Win	(Thailand) Sany Bangtao Muaythai	Bangla Boxing Stadium	Thailand	Decision	5	3:00
2012-09-09	Win	(Thailand) Ramil SinbiMuayThai	Bangla Boxing Stadium	Thailand	Decision	5	3:00
Legend: Win Loss Draw/no contest Notes

== See also ==
- List of male kickboxers
