= Rambo Pet.Por.Tor.Or =

Muay Thai fighter

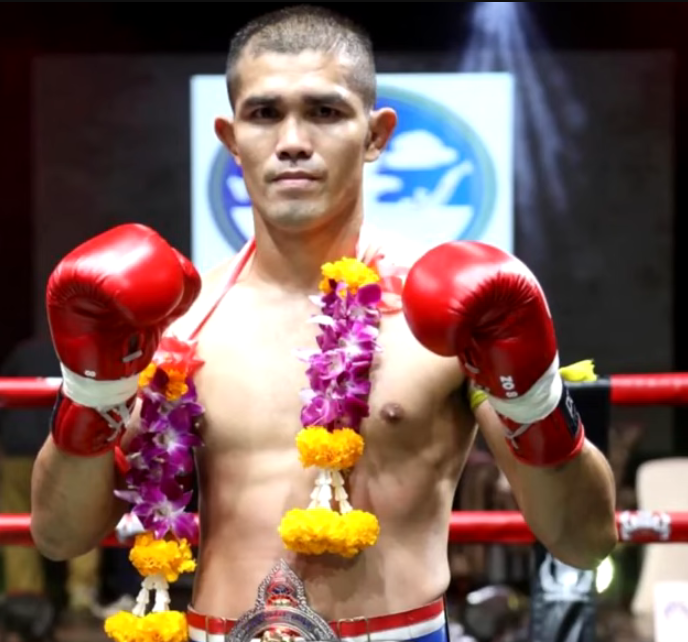
- Born: Narin Wonglakhon; 2 September 1990 (age 36); Sisaket Province, Thailand
- Other names: Rambo Mor Rattanabandit (แรมโบ้ ม.รัตนบัณฑิต); Rambo J.PowerRoofSamui (แรมโบ้ เจ.พาวเวอร์รูฟสมุย); Rambo Petphokhao (แรมโบ้ เพชรโพธิ์ขาว); Rambo Por Tor.Or.Phan6 (แรมโบ้ ปตอ.พัน6); Rambo Sitnayoktiew (แรมโบ้ ศิษย์นายกเที่ยว); Rambo Phet Por.Tor.Aor; Rambo PetchPTT
- Height: 174 cm (5 ft 9 in)
- Weight: 65 kg (143 lb; 10.2 st)
- Stance: Orthodox
- Fighting out of: Sisaket Province, Thailand
- Team: Pet Por Tor Or gym

Rambo Pet.Por.Tor.Or (Thai: แรมโบ้ เพชร ปตอ.) is a Thai Muay Thai fighter. He is a former two-time Rajadamnern stadium champion. For the February 2025 Rajadamnern stadium rankings, Rambo was ranked the number 10 super welterweight(154 lbs.)

== Career ==
On May 2, 2016, Rambo lost by decision to Yodpanomrung Jitmuangnon at the Rajadamnern Stadium.

On August 8, 2016, Rambo faced Chujaroen Dabransarakarm at the Rajadamnern stadium. He lost the fight by unanimous decision.

On September 11, 2016, Rambo faced Sittisak Petpayathai for the vacant Channel 7 Stadium 135 lbs title. He won the fight by unanimous decision and captured the belt.

On March 3, 2017, Rambo faced Muangthai P.K. Saenchaimuaythaigym for the vacant Thailand 135 lbs title. He lost the fight by decision.

On April 4, 2017, Rambo defeated Rafi Bohic by decision at the Lumpinee Stadium.

On December 10, 2017, Rambo challenged Chujaroen Dabransarakarm for his Channel 7 Stadium 140 lbs title. He lost the fight by unanimous decision.

On January 26, 2018, Rambo faced Muangthai P.K. Saenchaimuaythaigym for the fourth time, at the Channel 7 Stadium. He won the fight by decision after scoring a knockdown in the fourth round with an elbow.

On May 22, 2018, Rambo faced Thananchai Rachanon at the Lumpinee Stadium in an event co promoted by Phetnumnoi and Phoenix FC for the vacant Phoenix 147 lbs title. He lost the fight by decision.

On August 8, 2018, Rambo faced Petpanomrung Kiatmuu9 at the Lumpinee Stadium for the Eminentair promotion. He won by knockout in the fourth round. The result led to protest due to the head kick knockout blow landindg as Petpanomrung was already down according to some observators.

On November 18, 2018, Rambo took part in the 2018 SHOOT BOXING S-cup 65 kg Tournament. In the quarterfinals he faced Japanese fighter UMA who defeated him by unanimous decision.

On March 23, 2019, Rambo travelled to Bolton, England to face Christopher Shaw at YOKKAO 38. He lost the fight by majority decision.

On February 20, 2020, Rambo went to a draw with Nonthakit AeSaphansung at the Lumpinee Stadium.

On November 14, 2020, Rambo faced Saenpon Petchpachara at the Omnoi Stadium. He lost the fight by decision. A rematched was scheduled a month later on December 17, 2020, with the vacant Rajadamnern Stadium 147 lbs title at stake. Rambo won the fight by decision.

On July 3, 2021, Rambo faced Julio Lobo for the vacant Omnoi Stadium 147 lbs title. He lost the fight by decision.

On September 19, 2022, Rambo challenged Taksila Chor.Hapayak for the 154 lbs Thailand title at the Thupatemi Stadium for the Sor.Sommai promotion. He won the fight by decision.

On March 31, 2023, at ONE Friday Fights 11 Rambo replaced Pongsiri P.K.Saenchaimuaythaigym in a fight against Tyson Harrison. He lost the fight knockout in the third round but received a performance bonus for the fierce he put up.

Rambo faced Shoot Boxing Lightweight champion Hiroki Kasahara in an open-finger glove bout at SHOOT BOXING 2023 act.2 on April 30, 2023. He lost the fight by unanimous decision, with two scorecards of 30–28 and one scorecard of 30–29.

== Titles and accomplishments ==
- Channel 7 Boxing Stadium
  - 2016 Channel 7 Stadium 135 lbs Champion
- Rajadamnern Stadium
  - 2020 Rajadamnern Stadium 147 lbs Champion
- Professional Boxing Association of Thailand (PAT)
  - 2022 Thailand 154 lbs Champion
  - 2023 Thailand 154 lbs Champion
- LWC Super Champ
  - 2024 LWC World Army 154 lbs Champion
- International Federation of Muaythai Associations
  - 2019 IFMA Asian Championships −67 kg (gold)
  - 2023 IFMA World Championships −67 kg (gold)

== Fight record ==
Date	Result	Opponent	Event	Location	Method	Round	Time
2025-05-24	Win	(Morocco) Oussama Taoud	LWC Super Champ, Lumpinee Stadium	Bangkok, Thailand	Decision	5	3:00
2025-03-29	Loss	(Cambodia) Lao Chetra	CNC Sports	Cambodia	Decision	3	3:00
2025-03-22	Win	(Iran) Ali Bahrami Samet	LWC Super Champ, Lumpinee Stadium	Bangkok, Thailand	KO	4	
2025-01-04	Win	(Netherlands) Stijn Korll	Rajadamnern World Series, Rajadamnern Stadium	Bangkok, Thailand	KO (Knee to the body)	2	
2024-12-08	Loss	(France) Brice Delval	Lumpinee Champion + SKS Empire, Lumpinee Stadium	Bangkok, Thailand	Decision	3	3:00
For the interim Lumpinee Stadium 150 lbs title.
2024-09-29	Win	(Thailand) Petchsaifah SorJor.Vichitpaedriw	LWC Super Champ, Lumpinee Stadium	Bangkok, Thailand	Decision	5	3:00
Wins the vacant LWC World Army 154 lbs title.
2024-08-24	Win	(Thailand) Chalampetch Sitpanomthong	LWC Super Champ, Lumpinee Stadium	Bangkok, Thailand	KO	3	
2024-06-25	Win	(United States) Rafael Angobaldo	X Muay Thai Championship, Thupatemi Stadium	Bangkok, Thailand	Decision	5	3:00
2024-01-17	Loss	(Thailand) Yodkompatak SinbiMuayThai	Muay Thai Palangmai, Rajadamnern Stadium	Bangkok, Thailand	Decision	5	3:00
2023-12-20	Win	(Thailand) Yodkompatak SinbiMuayThai	Muay Thai Palangmai, Rajadamnern Stadium	Bangkok, Thailand	Decision	5	3:00
2023-09-29	Loss	(Iran) Sajad Sattari	ONE Friday Fights 35, Lumpinee Stadium	Bangkok, Thailand	Decision (Unanimous)	3	3:00
2023-09-04	Win	(Thailand) Yodkompatak SinbiMuayThai	Muay Thai Pantamit, Thupatemi Stadium	Pathum Thani province, Thailand	Decision	5	3:00
Wins the vacant Thailand Super Welterweight (154 lbs) title.
2023-07-21	Loss	(Uzbekistan) Mavlud Tupiev	ONE Friday Fights 26, Lumpinee Stadium	Bangkok, Thailand	Decision (Unanimous)	3	3:00
2023-04-30	Loss	(Japan) Hiroki Kasahara	SHOOT BOXING 2023 act.2	Tokyo, Japan	Decision (Unanimous)	3	3:00
2023-03-31	Loss	(Australia) Tyson Harrison	ONE Friday Fights 11, Lumpinee Stadium	Bangkok, Thailand	KO (Right cross)	3	3:00
2023-02-25	Loss	(Thailand) Komawut F.A Group	Rajadamnern Stadium	Bangkok, Thailand	KO (Punches)	2	1:36
2023-01-24	Win	(Thailand) Taksila Chor.Hapayak	Muay Thai Lumpinee Pitaktham, Lumpinee Stadium	Bangkok, Thailand	Decision	5	3:00
2022-12-24	Win	(Thailand) Saenpon Sor.Sommai	Rajadamnern Stadium	Bangkok, Thailand	Decision (Unanimous)	5	3:00
2022-11-18	Win	(Iraq) Sajjad Petchsamarn Muaythai	Rajadamnern World Series	Bangkok, Thailand	Decision (Unanimous)	3	3:00
2022-10-26	Loss	(Thailand) Saenpon Sor.Sommai	Sor.Sommai, Rajadamnern Stadium	Bangkok, Thailand	Decision	5	3:00
2022-09-19	Win	(Thailand) Taksila Chor Hapayak	Sor.Sommai, Thupatemi Stadium	Pathum Thani, Thailand	Decision	5	3:00
Wins the Thailand 154 lbs title
2022-09-16	Win	(Tunisia) Yasser BalanceMuaythai	Fighter X	Bangkok, Thailand	Decision	5	3:00
2022-08-17	Win	(Thailand) PheuThai Por.Phanompon	Muay Thai Palangmai, Rajadamnern Stadium	Bangkok, Thailand	KO (Elbow)	3	
2022-07-21	Win	(Israel) Itay Gershon	Fighter X	Bangkok, Thailand	Decision	5	3:00
2022-02-12	Win	(Iran) Abdollah Anizh	Muay Hardcore	Bangkok, Thailand	Decision	3	3:00
2021-12-25	Loss	(Turkey) Furkan Karabag	Muay Hardcore	Bangkok, Thailand	KO (Elbow)	2	1:44
2021-12-05	Win	(Iran) Mohammad Siasarani	Muay Thai Super Champ	Bangkok, Thailand	Decision	3	3:00
2021-11-14	Draw	(Portugal) Fabio Reis	Muay Hardcore	Bangkok, Thailand	Decision	3	3:00
2021-07-03	Loss	(Brazil) Julio Lobo	SuekJaoMuayThai, Fonjang Chonburi Stadium	Chonburi, Thailand	Decision	5	3:00
For the vacant Omnoi Stadium 147 lbs title
2021-03-06	Win	(Thailand) Saenpon PetchphacharaAcademy	WSS, World Siam Stadium	Bangkok, Thailand	Decision	5	3:00
2020-12-17	Win	(Thailand) Saenpon PetchphacharaAcademy	Sor.Thanapol, World Siam Stadium	Bangkok, Thailand	Decision (Unanimous)	5	3:00
Wins the vacant Rajadamnern Stadium 147 lbs title
2020-11-14	Loss	(Thailand) Saenpon PetchphacharaAcademy	Muay DeeVithiThai, Omnoi Stadium	Samut Sakhon, Thailand	Decision	5	3:00
2020-10-07	Loss	(Thailand) Saenpon PetchphacharaAcademy	Muay Thai Palangmai, Rajadamnern Stadium	Bangkok, Thailand	Decision	5	3:00
2020-08-01	Loss	(Brazil) Victor Almeida	Muay Hardcore	Bangkok, Thailand	TKO (Right cross)	2	2:53
2020-02-15	Draw	(Thailand) Nonthakit AeSaphansung	Lumpinee TKO, Lumpinee Stadium	Bangkok, Thailand	Decision	5	3:00
2020-01-11	Win	(United Kingdom) Ahmed Hussein	Muay Hardcore	Bangkok, Thailand	TKO (Doctor stoppage)	3	2:46
2019-10-26	Loss	(China) Liu Xiangming	Wu Lin Feng 2019: WLF -67kg World Cup 2019-2020	Zhengzhou, China	KO (Spinning back fist)	2	
2019-09-06	Win	(China) Wang Pengfei	Wu Lin Feng 2019: WLF at Lumpinee - China vs Thailand	Bangkok, Thailand	TKO (retirement/injury)	1	3:00
2019-06-30	Loss	(Cambodia) Thea Nureach	PNNTV Boxing	Cambodia	DQ (hit behind the head)	3	
2019-06-14	Win	(Thailand) Kongsak P.K.Saenchaimuaythaigym	Phetchachara	Ubon Ratchathani province, Thailand	Decision	5	3:00
2019-03-23	Loss	(United Kingdom) Christopher Shaw	YOKKAO 38	Bolton, England	Decision (Majority)	5	3:00
2019-01-31	Loss	(Thailand) Yodpanomrung Jitmuangnon	Rajadamnern Stadium	Bangkok, Thailand	Decision	5	3:00
2018-11-18	Loss	(Japan) UMA	Shoot Boxing: S Cup -65 kg World Tournament 2018, Quarter Final	Tokyo, Japan	Decision (Unanimous)	3	3:00
2018-11-04	Win	(Brazil) Luis Cajaiba	Muay Thai Super Champ	Bangkok, Thailand	Decision	3	3:00
2018-10-13	Win	(United Kingdom) Nathan Bendon	YOKKAO 32	Bolton, England	Decision (Split)	5	3:00
2018-09-16	Loss	(Thailand) Kongsak P.K.Saenchaimuaythaigym	MuayThai 7 see, Channel 7 Stadium	Bangkok, Thailand	Decision	5	3:00
2018-05-22	Loss	(Thailand) Thananchai Rachanon	Phetnumnoi, Lumpinee Stadium	Bangkok, Thailand	Decision	5	3:00
For the Phoenix FC 147 lbs Title.
2018-04-10	Win	(Thailand) Rittewada Sitthikul	Kiatpetch Super Fight Roadshow + Sawansangmanja	Khon Kaen, Thailand	Decision	5	3:00
2018-03-16	Loss	(Thailand) Thananchai Rachanon		Phra Nakhon Si Ayutthaya, Thailand	Decision	5	3:00
For the vacant Thailand 147 lbs Title.
2018-01-26	Win	(Thailand) Muangthai P.K. Saenchaimuaythaigym	Channel 7 Boxing Stadium	Bangkok, Thailand	Decision	5	3:00
2017-12-10	Loss	(Thailand) Chujaroen Dabransarakarm	Channel 7 Stadium	Bangkok, Thailand	Decision	5	3:00
For the Channel 7 Stadium 140lbs title.
2017-08-08	Win	(Thailand) Petpanomrung Kiatmuu9	Eminentair, Lumpinee Stadium	Bangkok, Thailand	TKO (Sweep to head kick)	3	
2017-06-09	Loss	(Thailand) Yodlekpet Or. Pitisak	Lumpinee Stadium	Bangkok, Thailand	TKO (Ref. stop/Punches + low kicks)	4	
For the vacant Lumpinee Stadium Lightweight (135 lbs) title.
2017-04-04	Win	(France) Rafi Bohic	Lumpinee Stadium	Bangkok, Thailand	Decision	5	3:00
2017-03-07	Loss	(Thailand) Muangthai P.K. Saenchaimuaythaigym	Onesongchai Fight, Lumpinee Stadium	Bangkok, Thailand	Decision	5	3:00
For the vacant Thailand 135 lbs title.
2017-02-11	Win	(Thailand) Muangthai P.K. Saenchaimuaythaigym		Thailand	Decision	5	3:00
2017-01-24	Win	(Thailand) Muangthai P.K. Saenchaimuaythaigym	Petchkiatpetch, Lumpinee Stadium	Bangkok, Thailand	Decision	5	3:00
2016-12-18	Loss	(Thailand) Nontakit Tor Morsri	Kom Chad Luek Muay Thai	Chiang Mai province, Thailand	Decision	5	3:00
2016-11-16	Loss	(Thailand) Yodpanomrung Jitmuangnon	Lumpinee Stadium	Bangkok, Thailand	Decision	5	3:00
2016-09-11	Win	(Thailand) Sittisak Petpayathai	Channel 7 Boxing Stadium	Bangkok, Thailand	Decision	5	3:00
Wins the vacant Channel 7 Boxing Stadium 135 lbs title.
2016-08-08	Win	(Thailand) Chujaroen Dabransarakarm	Rajadamnern Stadium	Bangkok, Thailand	Decision	5	3:00
2016-06-28	Win	(Thailand) Yodpanomrung Jitmuangnon	Kiatpetch, Lumpinee Stadium	Bangkok, Thailand	Decision	5	3:00
2016-05-30	Win	(Thailand) Kiatphet Suanaharnpeekmai	Tor.Chaiwat, Rajadamnern Stadium	Bangkok, Thailand	Decision	5	3:00
2016-05-02	Loss	(Thailand) Yodpanomrung Jitmuangnon	Rajadamnern Stadium	Bangkok, Thailand	Decision	5	3:00
2016-03-13	Win	(Thailand) Phetmai TheGulfPattaya	Muay Dee Vithi Thai, Rangsit Stadium	Bangkok, Thailand	Decision	5	3:00
2016-01-03	Win	(Thailand) Jaisu Sor.Jor.Piek-Uthai	Kom Chad Luek Muay Thai	Uthai Thani province, Thailand	Decision	5	3:00
2015-12-06	Win	(Thailand) Nontakit Sor.Jor Lekmuangnon	Kom Chad Luek Muay Thai	Thailand	Decision	5	3:00
2015-09-27	Loss	(Thailand) Simanut Sor.Sarinya	MuayThai 7 see, Channel 7 Stadium	Bangkok, Thailand	Decision	5	3:00
2015-08-28	Loss	(Thailand) Satanfah Rachanon	Lumpinee Stadium	Bangkok, Thailand	Decision	5	3:00
2015-08-06	Win	(Thailand) Panpetch Kiatcharoenchai	Jitmuangnon, Rajadamnern Stadium	Bangkok, Thailand	Decision	5	3:00
2015-06-13	Win	(Thailand) Lampard Sor.Jor. Piek-Uthai	Omnoi Stadium	Samut Sakhon, Thailand	KO	3	
2015-05-17	Loss	(Thailand) Fahnamchai Or.Pitisak		Khon Kaen province, Thailand	Decision	5	3:00
2015-04-19	Loss	(Thailand) Fahnamchai Or.Pitisak	MuayThai 7see, Channel 7 Stadium	Bangkok, Thailand	Decision	5	3:00
2014-12-09	Win	(Thailand) Wangkaew PetchsiriGym		Nakhon Ratchasima province, Thailand	KO	2	
2014-11-29	Win	(Thailand) Dechanattha Phongfaifa		Nakhon Ratchasima province, Thailand	KO	3	
2014-11-09	Win	(Thailand) Angkharlek Excindicon		Yasothon province, Thailand	KO		
2014-10-31	Win	(Thailand) Khunphonjiew Sor.Suwanya		Yasothon province, Thailand	Decision	5	3:00
2014-09-11	Win	(Thailand) Kwanchai Phetniroj		Roi Et province, Thailand	Decision	5	3:00
2014-09-06	Loss	(Thailand) Pongsiri Por.Siripong	Daorung Wor.Wiwattananon	Surin province, Thailand	Decision	5	3:00
2014-08-21	Win	(Thailand) Samson Sor.Sompong		Thailand	KO	4	
2014-06-27	Loss	(Thailand) Kwanchai Phetniroj	Sor Kakarn Day + Chok Pranee Farm	Surin province, Thailand	Decision	5	3:00
2014-05-17	Win	(Cambodia) Em Vutha	AEC Fighting 2015	Cambodia	TKO (Referee stoppage)	5	
2013-10-13	Win	(Thailand) Angkharlek Excindicon		Sisaket province, Thailand	Decision	5	3:00
2013-07-27	Loss	(Thailand) Samson Sor.Sompong		Thailand	Decision	5	3:00
2013-07-16	Win	(Thailand) Dawut Luklongtan		Thailand	Decision	5	3:00
2012-12-12	Loss	(Thailand) Aikpikart Mor Krungthepthonburi	Rajadamnern Stadium	Bangkok, Thailand	KO (Elbow)	4	
2012-10-22	Win	(Thailand) Chennarong Tor.Thaksin		Thailand	KO	4	
2012-09-20	Loss	(Thailand) Veerapol Por.Suwanchoti	Suranaree Boxing Stadium	Nakhon Ratchasima province, Thailand	Decision	5	3:00
2012-05-16	Win	(Thailand) Sornkhao Sor.Monphonthong		Sisaket province, Thailand	Decision	5	3:00
2012-05-08	Win	(Thailand) Samson Santi-Ubon		Sisaket province, Thailand	Decision	5	3:00
2012-02-15	Loss	(Thailand) Saengmorakot Chuwattana	Rajadamnern Stadium	Bangkok, Thailand	KO (High kick)	4	
2010-02-01	Loss	(Thailand) Kaimukkao Por.Thairongruangkamai	Rajadamnern Stadium	Bangkok, Thailand	KO	4	
Legend: Win Loss Draw/No contest Notes

Amateur Muay Thai Record
Date	Result	Opponent	Event	Location	Method	Round	Time
2023-05-12	Win	(Israel) Maxim Branis	IFMA Senior World Championships 2023, Final	Bangkok, Thailand	Decision (29:28)	3	3:00
Wins 2023 IFMA World Championships -67kg Gold Medal.
2023-05-10	Win	(Russia) Kirill Khomutov	IFMA Senior World Championships 2023, Semi Final	Bangkok, Thailand	Decision (30:27)	3	3:00
2023-05-08	Win	(Hungary) Spéth Norbert Attila	IFMA Senior World Championships 2023, Quarter Final	Bangkok, Thailand	Decision (29:28)	3	3:00
2023-05-07	Win	(Morocco) Rachid Hamza	IFMA Senior World Championships 2023, Second Round	Bangkok, Thailand	Decision (29:28)	3	3:00
2023-05-05	Win	(Brazil) Jhonatan Morais	IFMA Senior World Championships 2023, First Round	Bangkok, Thailand	TKO	1	
2019-12-21	Win	(United Arab Emirates) Mohammed Mardi	IFMA Asian Championships 2019, Final	Bangkok, Thailand	Decision (29:28)	3	3:00
Wins 2019 IFMA Asian Championships -67kg Gold Medal.
2019-12-20	Win	(Iran) Mojtaba Taravati Aram	IFMA Asian Championships 2019, Semi Final	Bangkok, Thailand	Decision (29:28)	3	3:00
2019-12-19	Win	(Kazakhstan) Nurtaza Jumakhanov	IFMA Asian Championships 2019, Quarter Final	Bangkok, Thailand	Decision (30:27)	3	3:00
2019-12-18	Win	(Afghanistan) Murtaza Shamal	IFMA Asian Championships 2019, First Round	Bangkok, Thailand	Decision (30:27)	3	3:00
Legend: Win Loss Draw/No contest Notes

== See also ==
- List of male kickboxers
