= Chujaroen Dabransarakarm =

Muay Thai fighter

- Born: Thanawan Kongpetch; 23 January 1994 (age 32); Maha Sarakham Province, Thailand
- Height: 180 cm (5 ft 11 in)
- Weight: 65 kg (143 lb; 10.2 st)
- Division: Bantamweight
- Style: Muay Khao
- Stance: Orthodox
- Fighting out of: Bangkok, Thailand
- Team: Dabransarakarm

Chujaroen Dabransarakarm (ชูเจริญ ดาบรันสารคาม, born 23 January 1994) is a Thai Muay Thai fighter. He is a former Lumpinee Stadium 135 lbs champion. For the March 2024 world rankings, the WBC ranked Chujaroen Dabransarakarm as the number 4 contender in the welterweight division.

== Muay Thai career ==
He won the Lumpini Stadium 135 lbs title with a decision win against Yodpanomrung Jitmuangnon. The two of them fought in a rematch a month later, with Dabransarakarm once against winning a decision.

Dabransarakarm participated in the Top King 21 World Series, being scheduled to fight Ilya Grad. Dabransarakarm the fight by decision.

On December 10, 2017, Chujaroen successfully defended his Channel 7 Stadium 140 lbs title against Rambo Pet.Por.Tor.Or, defeating him by unanimous decision.

Churjaroen fought Thananchai Rachanon in the Lumpini Stadium in November 2018, and won a decision.

He entered the Top King 27 154 lbs tournament. Chujaroen won a decision against Victor Santos in the semi-finals, and a decision against Magnus Andersson in the finals.

In February 2019, Chujaroen won a decision against the former Lumpini Stadium 147 lbs champion Rafi Bohic.

Dabransarakarm fought Sangmanee Sor Tienpo in May 2019, a lost the fight by a unanimous decision.

Chujaroen fought Tawanchai PK Saenchaimuaythaigym in September 2019 in the Lumpinee Stadium, and lost a decision.

In August 2020, Chujaroen fought a rematch with Thananchai Rachanon in the Rangsit Stadium. Rachanon won a unanimous decision.

== Titles and accomplishments ==
- Top King World Series
  - 2018 Top King World Series 154 lbs Champion
- Channel 7 Boxing Stadium
  - 2017 Channel 7 Stadium 140 lbs Champion
- Lumpinee Stadium
  - 2015 Lumpinee Stadium Lightweight (135 lbs) Champion
- Siam Omnoi Stadium
  - 2014 Fooktien Group 130 lbs Tournament Winner

== Fight record ==
Date	Result	Opponent	Event	Location	Method	Round	Time
2026-05-23	Loss	(Republic of Ireland) Niall McGreevy	Rajadamnern World Series	Bangkok, Thailand	Decision (Unanimous)	3	3:00
2025-12-12	Loss	(Thailand) Nuenglanlek Jitmuangnon	Udon Sang Muay Thai Bai MuayLok	Udon Thani province, Thailand	Decision	5	3:00
2025-08-09	Loss	(Thailand) Capitan Petchyindee Academy	Yod Muay Isan Fight	Maha Sarakham province, Thailand	KO (Left hook)	2	
2025-05-03	Loss	(Thailand) Hercules Wor.Jakrawut	Rajadamnern World Series	Bangkok, Thailand	Decision (Unanimous)	3	3:00
2025-02-08	Loss	(Thailand) Nuenglanlek Jitmuangnon	Rajadamnern World Series	Bangkok, Thailand	KO (Punches)	1	1:24
For the interim Rajadamnern Stadium Welterweight (147 lbs) title.
2024-12-21	Win	(China) Zhao Yong	Rajadamnern World Series	Bangkok, Thailand	TKO (Punches)	2	
2024-10-19	Win	(Turkey) Gokhan Boran	Rajadamnern World Series	Bangkok, Thailand	Decision(Unanimous)	3	3:00
2024-09-07	Loss	(Turkey) Erdem Dincer	Rajadamnern World Series - Group Stage	Bangkok, Thailand	TKO (3 Knockdowns)	1	1:09
2024-08-03	Win	(Thailand) Saenpon Sor.Sommai	Rajadamnern World Series - Group Stage	Bangkok, Thailand	Decision (Unanimous)	3	3:00
2024-06-22	Loss	(Thailand) Tapaokaew Singmawynn	Rajadamnern World Series - Group Stage	Bangkok, Thailand	Decision (Split)	3	3:00
2024-05-23	Win	(Thailand) Khunhanlek Singmawin	Suk Petchyindee, Rajadamnern Stadium	Bangkok, Thailand	Decision	5	3:00
2024-02-13	Win	(Thailand) Tapaokaew Singmawynn	Muaymansananmuang Sarakham	Maha Sarakham province, Thailand	Decision	5	3:00
2023-12-16	Loss	(Thailand) Petchthongchai T.B.M Gym	Rajadamnern World Series	Bangkok, Thailand	Decision	5	3:00
For the vacant Rajadamnern Stadium Super Lightweight (140 lbs) title.
2023-11-09	Win	(Thailand) Rangkhao Wor.Sangprapai	Petchyindee, Rajadamnern Stadium	Bangkok, Thailand	Decision	5	3:00
2023-09-28	Win	(Thailand) Khunhanlek Kiatcharoenchai	Wan Ittipon Mahasakun, Rajadamnern Stadium	Bangkok, Thailand	Decision (Unanimous)	5	3:00
2023-08-19	Loss	(Thailand) Capitan Petchyindee Academy	Rajadamnern World Series - Final 4	Bangkok, Thailand	Decision (Unanimous)	3	3:00
2023-07-15	Win	(Iran) Saman Ashouri	Rajadamnern World Series - Group Stage	Bangkok, Thailand	KO (Elbow)	1	
2023-06-10	Win	(Thailand) Nuenglanlek Jitmuangnon	Rajadamnern World Series - Group Stage	Bangkok, Thailand	Decision (Unanimous)	3	3:00
2023-05-06	Win	(Russia) Aik Revolution Phuket	Rajadamnern World Series - Group Stage	Bangkok, Thailand	KO (Right cross)	1	3:00
2023-04-11	Loss	(Thailand) Capitan Petchyindee Academy	Muaymansananmuang Mahasarakham	Maha Sarakham province, Thailand	Decision	5	3:00
2022-12-28	Win	(Thailand) Rangkhao Wor.Sangprapai	Muay Thai Rakya Soosakon + SAT Super Fight Withee Tin Thai + Petchyindee	Bangkok, Thailand	Decision	5	3:00
2022-09-21	Win	(Thailand) Rungkit Wor.Sanprapai	Sinbi Muay Thai Birthday show + 789Tiger, Bangla Stadium	Phuket, Thailand	Decision	5	3:00
2022-06-30	Win	(Thailand) Petpanomrung Kiatmuu9	Petchyindee, Rajadamnern Stadium	Bangkok, Thailand	Decision	5	3:00
2022-05-12	Loss	(Thailand) Nuenglanlek Jitmuangnon	Petchyindee, Rajadamnern Stadium	Bangkok, Thailand	Decision	5	3:00
2022-02-10	Win	(Thailand) Petpanomrung Kiatmuu9	Petchyindee, Rajadamnern Stadium	Bangkok, Thailand	Decision	5	3:00
2021-12-02	Win	(Thailand) Chamuaktong Fightermuaythai	Petchyindee, Rangsit Stadium	Bangkok, Thailand	Decision	5	3:00
2021-10-15	Loss	(Thailand) Petpanomrung Kiatmuu9	True4U Muaymanwansuk	Buriram province, Thailand	Decision	5	3:00
2021-04-09	Win	(Thailand) Petpanomrung Kiatmuu9	Petchyindee Road Show, Temporary Stage	Songkhla, Thailand	Decision	5	3:00
2020-12-04	Draw	(Thailand) Rungkit Wor.Sanprapai	Muaymanwansuk, Rangsit Stadium	Rangsit, Thailand	Decision	5	3:00
2020-10-09	Win	(Thailand) Nuenglanlek Jitmuangnon	Muaymanwansuk, Rangsit Stadium	Rangsit, Thailand	Decision	5	3:00
2020-08-28	Win	(Thailand) Thananchai Rachanon	Muaymanwansuk, Rangsit Stadium	Rangsit, Thailand	Decision	5	3:00
2020-02-09	Loss	(Thailand) Nuenglanlek Jitmuangnon	Srithammaracha + Kiatpetch Super Fight	Nakhon Si Thammarat, Thailand	Decision	5	3:00
2020-01-18	Loss	(China) Meng Guodong	Wu Lin Feng 2020: WLF World Championship in Baise	Baise, China	Decision (Unanimous)	3	3:00
2019-12-06	Win	(France) Rafi Bohic	Lumpinee Stadium	Bangkok, Thailand	Decision	5	3:00
2019-09-29	Win	(China) Li Xin	Wu Lin Feng 2019: WLF -67kg World Cup 2019-2020 4th Group Stage	Zhengzhou, China	Ext.R Decision	4	3:00
2019-09-06	Loss	(Thailand) Tawanchai PK Saenchaimuaythaigym	Lumpinee Stadium	Bangkok, Thailand	Decision	5	3:00
2019-06-29	Loss	(China) Feng Lei	Wu Lin Feng 2019: WLF -67kg World Cup 2019-2020 1st Group Stage	Zhengzhou, China	Decision (Unanimous)	3	3:00
2019-05-10	Loss	(Thailand) Sangmanee Sor Tienpo	Lumpinee Stadium	Bangkok, Thailand	Decision	5	3:00
2019-03-30	Win	(China) Liu Yaning	Wu Lin Feng 2019: WLF x Lumpinee - China vs Thailand	Zhengzhou, China	Decision (Unanimous)	3	3:00
2019-02-05	Win	(France) Rafi Bohic	Lumpinee Stadium	Bangkok, Thailand	Decision	5	3:00
2018-12-31	Win	(Sweden) Magnus Andersson	Top King 27 World Series, Final	Pattaya, Thailand	Decision	3	3:00
Wins the 2018 Top King World Series 154lbs Tournament.
2018-12-31	Win	(Brazil) Victor Santos	Top King 27 World Series, Semi-final	Pattaya, Thailand	Decision	3	3:00
2018-11-27	Win	(Thailand) Thananchai Rachanon	Lumpinee Stadium	Bangkok, Thailand	Decision	5	3:00
2018-09-29	Win	(Iran) Keivan Soleimani	Top King 22 World Series	Koh Samui, Thailand	Decision	3	3:00
2018-08-12	Win	(Thailand) Littewada Sitthikul	Lumpinee Stadium	Bangkok, Thailand	Decision	5	3:00
2018-07-10	Loss	(Thailand) Thananchai Rachanon	Lumpinee Stadium	Bangkok, Thailand	Decision	5	3:00
2018-06-16	Win	(Israel) Ilya Grad	Top King 21 World Series	Surat Thani, Thailand	Decision	3	3:00
2018-04-28	Win	(France) Cedric Do	Top King 19 World Series	Thailand	Decision	3	3:00
2018-02-16	Win	(Thailand) Littewada Sitthikul	Muaythai Kiatphet Superfight	Thailand	Decision	5	3:00
2017-12-10	Win	(Thailand) Rambo Phetphokhao	Channel 7 Stadium	Bangkok, Thailand	Decision	5	3:00
Defends the Channel 7 Stadium 140lbs title.
2017-09-30	Win	(China) Meng Guodong	Top King 16 World Series	China	TKO		
2017-09-05	Loss	(Thailand) Phetmorakot Petchyindee Academy	Lumpinee Stadium	Bangkok, Thailand	Decision	5	3:00
2017-07-17	Win	(Thailand) Littewada Sitthikul	Lumpinee Stadium	Thailand	Decision	5	3:00
2017-05-27	Win	(Belarus) Dmitry Varats	Top King 13 World Series	China	Decision	3	3:00
2017-05-05	Win	(Thailand) Littewada Sitthikul	Lumpinee Stadium	Thailand	Decision	5	3:00
2017-03-21	Win	(Thailand) Chamuaktong Fightermuaythai	Lumpinee Stadium	Bangkok, Thailand	Decision	5	3:00
2017-02-12	Win	(Thailand) Yodpanomrung Jitmuangnon	Channel 7 Stadium	Bangkok, Thailand	Decision	5	3:00
Wins the Channel 7 140 lbs Title.
2017-01-14	Win	(Slovakia) Marco Novak	Top King 12 World Series	China	Decision	3	3:00
2016-12-09	Loss	(Thailand) Chamuaktong Fightermuaythai	Lumpinee Stadium	Bangkok, Thailand	Decision	5	3:00
For the Lumpinee Stadium 140lbs Title.
2016-10-29	Win	(France) Rafi Bohic	Best Of Siam IX Lumpinee Stadium	Thailand	TKO	3	
2016-10-04	Loss	(Thailand) Littewada Sitthikul	Lumpinee Stadium	Thailand	Decision	5	3:00
2016-09-02	Loss	(Thailand) Chamuaktong Fightermuaythai	Lumpinee Stadium	Bangkok, Thailand	Decision	5	3:00
2016-08-08	Win	(Thailand) Rambo Pet.Por.Tor.Or	Rajadamnern Stadium	Bangkok, Thailand	Decision	5	3:00
2016-07-03	Win	(Thailand) Satanfah Rachanon	Rajadamnern Stadium	Bangkok, Thailand	Decision	5	3:00
2016-06-26	Loss	(Thailand) Sittisak Petpayathai	Lumpinee Stadium	Bangkok, Thailand	Decision	5	3:00
2016-06-03	Loss	(Thailand) Sittisak Petpayathai	Lumpinee Stadium	Bangkok, Thailand	Decision	5	3:00
2016-05-05	Win	(Thailand) Kiatpet Suanahanpeakmai	Rajadamnern Stadium	Bangkok, Thailand	Decision	5	3:00
2016-03-07	Loss	(Thailand) Sittisak Petpayathai	Sermthai Complex	Maha Sarakham Province Thailand	Decision	5	3:00
Lost the Lumpinee Stadium Lightweight (135 lbs) title.
2016-02-12	Loss	(Thailand) Satanfah Rachanon	Lumpinee Stadium	Bangkok, Thailand	Decision	5	3:00
2015-12-22	Loss	(Thailand) Yodpanomrung Jitmuangnon	Lumpinee Stadium	Bangkok, Thailand	Decision	5	3:00
2015-11-10	Loss	(Thailand) Phetmorakot Petchyindee Academy	Lumpinee Stadium	Bangkok, Thailand	Decision	5	3:00
2015-10-05	Win	(Thailand) Yodpanomrung Jitmuangnon	Rajadamnern Stadium	Bangkok, Thailand	Decision	5	3:00
2015-09-04	Win	(Thailand) Yodpanomrung Jitmuangnon	Lumpinee Stadium	Bangkok, Thailand	Decision	5	3:00
Wins the vacant Lumpinee Stadium Lightweight (135 lbs) title.
2015-08-07	Loss	(Thailand) Phetmorakot Petchyindee Academy	Lumpinee Stadium	Bangkok, Thailand	Decision	5	3:00
2015-06-30	Win	(Thailand) Kongsak Saenchaimuaythaigym	Lumpinee Stadium	Bangkok, Thailand	Decision	5	3:00
2015-05-31	Loss	(Thailand) Sittisak Petpayathai	Channel 7 Stadium	Bangkok, Thailand	Decision	5	3:00
2015-04-10	Loss	(Thailand) Yodpanomrung Jitmuangnon	Lumpinee Stadium	Bangkok, Thailand	Decision	5	3:00
2015-01-25	Win	(Thailand) Padsaenlek Rachanon	Channel 7 Stadium	Bangkok, Thailand	Decision	5	3:00
2014-11-24	Win	(Thailand) Saksuriya Chor KowHaaIsuzu	Rajadamnern Stadium	Bangkok, Thailand	Decision	5	3:00
2014-09-21	Loss	(Thailand) Wanchalerm Sor.Jor.Vichitpadriew	Channel 7 Stadium	Bangkok, Thailand	Decision	5	3:00
2014-05-12	Win	(Thailand) Monkao Chor Janmanee	Lumpinee Stadium	Bangkok, Thailand	Decision	5	3:00
2014-02-22	Win	(Thailand) Daoprang Sakniranrat	Siam Omnoi Stadium	Bangkok, Thailand	Decision	5	3:00
Wins the 2014 Fooktien Group 130 lbs Tournament title.
2014-01-18	Win	(Thailand) Hannatee Kiatjarernchai	Siam Omnoi Stadium	Bangkok, Thailand	Decision	5	3:00
2013-09-07	Loss	(Thailand) Por.Tor.Thor. Petchrungruang	Lumpinee Stadium	Bangkok, Thailand	Decision	5	3:00
	Win	(Thailand) Wanek Sor Supap		Thailand			
	Win	(Thailand) Sangthongnoi Tanasuranakhon		Thailand			
2011-11-22	Loss	(Thailand) Phetthaweesak W.Rungniran	Rajadamnern Stadium	Bangkok, Thailand	KO		
Legend: Win Loss Draw/No contest Notes

== See also ==
- List of male kickboxers
