= Thananchai Sitsongpeenong =

Muay Thai fighter

- Born: Thanet Nitutorn; February 23, 2001 (age 25); Thawat Buri District, Thailand
- Other names: Thananchai Rachanon (ธนัญชัย ราชานนท์); Thananchai Puicharleephate; Thananchai Por.Homklin (ธนัญชัย พ.หอมกลิ่น)
- Height: 185 cm (6 ft 1 in)
- Weight: 70 kg (154 lb; 11 st)
- Style: Muay Khao
- Fighting out of: Bangkok, Thailand

Kickboxing record
- Total: 111
- Wins: 87
- By knockout: 27
- Losses: 23
- Draws: 1

Other information
- Boxing record from BoxRec

Medal record

Men's Muay Thai

Representing Thailand

World Championships
| Gold medal – first place | 2019 Bangkok | 67 kg |
| Bronze medal – third place | 2021 Bangkok | 71 kg |

World Games
| Gold medal – first place | 2022 Birmingham | 71 kg |

Thananchai Sitsongpeenong (Thai: ธนัญชัย ศิษย์สองพี่น้อง) is a Thai Muay Thai fighter. He is the 2023 Rajadamnern World Series Super Welterweight (70 kg) champion. As of June 2024 , Combat Press ranked Thananchai the second best super welterweight (154 pounds) fighter in the world.

== Biography and career ==
Thananchai was taught Muay Thai from a young age by his father. He made his professional debut at 14. In 2020, Thananchai moved from Rachanon gym to Sitsongpeenpong to chase his dream of becoming a World Champion.

On March 11, 2023, Thananchai defeated Nauzet Trujillo at KSP Promotion in Kuwait to win the WBC Muaythai Super Welterweight (154lb) Championship.

== Titles and accomplishments ==
=== Professional ===
- World Muay Thai Council
  - 2018 WMC World -147 lb Champion
- Professional Boxing Association of Thailand (PAT)
  - 2018 Thailand -147 lb Champion
- Phoenix Fighting Championship
  - 2018 Phoenix FC -147 lb Champion
- Siam Omnoi Stadium
  - 2018 Omnoi Stadium -147 lb Champion
- World Boxing Council Muay Thai
  - 2023 WBC Muay Thai World Super Welterweight (154 lbs) Champion
- Rajadamnern Stadium
  - 2023 Rajadamnern World Series Super Welterweight (154 lbs) Winner
  - 2025 interim Rajadamnern Stadium Middleweight (160 lbs) Champion

=== Amateur ===
- International Federation of Muaythai Associations
  - 2019 IFMA World Championships -67 kg (gold)
  - 2021 IFMA World Championships -71 kg (bronze)
  - 2024 IFMA World Championships -71 kg (silver)
- World Games
  - 2022 World Games IFMA Muay Thai -71 kg (gold)
- World Combat Games
  - 2023 World Combat Games Muay Thai -71 kg (silver)

== Fight record ==
87 Wins (27 (T)KO's), 23 Losses, 1 Draw
| Date | Result | Opponent | Event | Location | Method | Round | Time |
| 2026-10-03 | Win | (Thailand) Thanupetch Wor. Technoluangpoosuang | Rajadamnern World Series | Bangkok, Thailand | KO (elbow) | 2 | 1:28 |
| 2025-12-20 | Win | (Brazil) Emerson Bento | Rajadamnern World Series | Bangkok, Thailand | Decision (Unanimous) | 5 | 3:00 |
Defends the interim Rajadamnern Stadium Middleweight (160 lbs) title.
| 2025-10-25 | Win | (Ghana) Elad Suman | Rajadamnern World Series | Bangkok, Thailand | Decision (Unanimous) | 5 | 3:00 |
Wins the interim Rajadamnern Stadium Middleweight (160 lbs) title.
| 2025-09-06 | Win | (Brazil) George Ferreira | Rajadamnern World Series, Rajadamnern Stadium | Bangkok, Thailand | KO (Knee) | 1 | 1:56 |
| 2025-06-07 | Win | (Iran) Babak Sorkhedizaj | Rajadamnern World Series | Bangkok, Thailand | TKO (Elbows) | 1 | 2:33 |
| 2025-03-08 | Win | (Russia) Sergey Kosykh | Rajadamnern World Series | Bangkok, Thailand | KO (elbow) | 2 | 1:33 |
| 2025-01-07 | Win | (France) Omar Samb | Ganzberg Kun Khmer | Phnom Penh, Cambodia | KO (Elbow) | 2 | 0:36 |
| 2024-11-09 | Loss | (Thailand) Rittewada Petchyindee Academy | Rajadamnern World Series - Final 4 | Bangkok, Thailand | Decision (Unanimous) | 3 | 3:00 |
| 2024-10-05 | Win | (Thailand) Rasising AyothayaFightGym | Rajadamnern World Series - Group Stage | Bangkok, Thailand | KO | 3 | 2:17 |
| 2024-08-31 | Win | (Belarus) Pavel Hryshanovich | Rajadamnern World Series - Group Stage | Bangkok, Thailand | KO (Right cross) | 2 | 1:44 |
| 2024-07-27 | Loss | (Switzerland) Daniel Rodriguez | Rajadamnern World Series - Group Stage | Bangkok, Thailand | Decision (Unanimous) | 3 | 3:00 |
| 2024-04-27 | Win | (Brazil) Gabriel Pereira | Rajadamnern World Series | Bangkok, Thailand | KO (Uppercut) | 1 | |
| 2024-03-20 | Loss | (Suriname) Romano Bakboord | K-1 World MAX 2024 - World Tournament Opening Round | Tokyo, Japan | Ext.R Decision (Split) | 4 | 3:00 |
Fails to qualify for K-1 World MAX 2024 World Championship Final.
| 2023-12-23 | Win | (Tunisia) Marwen Houli | Rajadamnern World Series | Bangkok, Thailand | KO (Punches) | 2 | 2:10 |
| 2023-10-07 | Win | (Thailand) Yodwicha Por Boonsit | Rajadamnern World Series - Final | Bangkok, Thailand | Decision (Unanimous) | 3 | 3:00 |
Wins the 2023 Rajadamnern World Series Super Welterweight (154 lbs) title.
| 2023-09-09 | Win | (Thailand) Petchmorakot Petchyindee Academy | Rajadamnern World Series - Final 4 | Bangkok, Thailand | Decision (Split) | 3 | 3:00 |
| 2023-08-05 | Win | (Thailand) Kongjak Por.Paoin | Rajadamnern World Series - Group Stage | Bangkok, Thailand | Decision (Unanimous) | 3 | 3:00 |
| 2023-07-01 | Win | (Iran) Reza Ahmadnezhad | Rajadamnern World Series - Group Stage | Bangkok, Thailand | KO (Elbow) | 3 | 1:35 |
| 2023-05-27 | Loss | (Switzerland) Daniel Rodriguez | Rajadamnern World Series - Group Stage | Bangkok, Thailand | Decision (Split) | 3 | 3:00 |
| 2023-04-29 | Win | (Iran) Shahoo Gheisarian | Rajadamnern World Series | Bangkok, Thailand | TKO (Referee stoppage) | 3 | 0:39 |
| 2023-03-11 | Win | (Spain) Nauzet Trujillo | KSP Muay Thai | Kuwait City | KO | 4 | |
Wins the vacant WBC Muay Thai World Super Welterweight title.
| 2023-02-04 | Win | (Morocco) Oussama Elkouche | Amazing Muay Thai Festival | Hua Hin, Thailand | Decision (Unanimous) | 3 | 3:00 |
| 2022-10-28 | Win | (Iran) Mohammad Siasarani | Rajadamnern World Series | Bangkok, Thailand | KO (Knee to the body) | 2 | 1:35 |
| 2022-09-23 | Win | (Cambodia) Thoeun Theara | Rajadamnern World Series | Bangkok, Thailand | Decision (Unanimous) | 3 | 3:00 |
| 2022-08-19 | Win | (Iran) Mohammad Siasarani | Rajadamnern World Series | Bangkok, Thailand | Decision (Unanimous) | 3 | 3:00 |
| 2022-05-14 | Win | (France) Valentin Thibaut | Venum Fight, Rajadamnern Stadium | Bangkok, Thailand | Decision | 5 | 3:00 |
| 2022-03-12 | Win | (United States) Tucker Sorrell | Muay Thai Super Champ | Phuket, Thailand | Decision | 3 | 3:00 |
| 2022-01-23 | Win | (Israel) Maxim Branis | Muay Thai Super Champ | Phuket, Thailand | Decision | 3 | 3:00 |
| 2021-04-02 | Loss | (Thailand) Phetmorakot Petchyindee Academy | True4U Muaymanwansuk, Rangsit Stadium | Rangsit, Thailand | Decision | 5 | 3:00 |
| 2020-11-13 | Win | (Thailand) Sorgraw Petchyindee | True4U Muaymanwansuk, Rangsit Stadium | Pathum Thani, Thailand | Decision | 5 | 3:00 |
| 2020-08-28 | Loss | (Thailand) Chujaroen Dabransarakarm | True4U Muaymanwansuk, Rangsit Stadium | Pathum Thani, Thailand | Decision | 5 | 3:00 |
| 2020-02-28 | Win | (Thailand) Sangmanee Sor Tienpo | Ruamponkonchon Pratan Super Fight | Pathum Thani, Thailand | Decision | 5 | 3:00 |
| 2020-01-24 | Loss | (Thailand) Yodpanomrung Jitmuangnon | Lumpinee Stadium | Bangkok, Thailand | Decision | 5 | 3:00 |
For the IMC Welterweight Title.
| 2019-10-15 | Win | (Thailand) Yodpanomrung Jitmuangnon | Lumpinee Stadium | Bangkok, Thailand | TKO (Doctor Stop/Elbow) | 4 | |
| 2019-09-09 | Win | (China) Luo Jie | WBC Muaythai Lumpinee Stadium | Bangkok, Thailand | TKO | 1 | |
| 2019-03-08 | Win | (United Kingdom) Jack Kennedy | Fight Night Dubai | United Arab Emirates | Decision (Unanimous) | 3 | 3:00 |
| 2018-11-27 | Loss | (Thailand) Chujaroen Dabransarakarm | Lumpinee Stadium | Bangkok, Thailand | Decision | 5 | 3:00 |
| 2018-10-12 | Loss | (France) Rafi Bohic | All Star Muay-Thai | Aubervilliers, France | KO (Low Kick) | 3 | |
For the Lumpinee Stadium -147 lb Title.
| 2018-08-25 | Win | (Thailand) Phonek Or.Kwanmuang | Omnoi Stadium | Bangkok, Thailand | Decision | 5 | 3:00 |
Wins Omnoi Stadium -147 lb Title.
| 2018-07-10 | Win | (Thailand) Chujaroen Dabransarakarm | Lumpinee Stadium | Bangkok, Thailand | Decision | 5 | 3:00 |
| 2018-05-18 | Win | (Thailand) Rambo Pet.Por.Tor.Or | Lumpinee Stadium | Bangkok, Thailand | Decision | 5 | 3:00 |
Wins Phoenix FC -147 lb Title.
| 2018-03 | Win | (Thailand) Rambo Pet.Por.Tor.Or | | Phra Nakhon Si Ayutthaya, Thailand | Decision | 5 | 3:00 |
Wins Thailand -147 lb Title.
| 2018-02-07 | Win | (France) Brayan Matias | Muaythai Day | Bangkok, Thailand | Decision | 5 | 3:00 |
Wins the WMC World -147 lb Title.
| 2018-01 | Loss | (Thailand) Yodpanomrung Jitmuangnon | | Yala Province, Thailand | Decision | 5 | 3:00 |
| 2017-12-31 | Loss | (Cambodia) Lao Chantrea | Carabao Stadium | Phnom Penh, Cambodia | Decision | 5 | 3:00 |
| 2017-12-03 | Win | (Thailand) Navee J-Powerroof Puket | Rangsit Stadium | Pathum Thani, Thailand | KO (Knees) | 3 | |
| 2017-09-07 | Win | (Australia) Joshua Suramach | Thai Fight Samui | Koh Samui, Thailand | KO (Knees) | 2 | |
| 2017-07-15 | Win | (Philippines) Ryan Jakiri | Thai Fight Yala | Thailand | KO (Knee) | 2 | |
| 2017-05-07 | Win | (Thailand) Simanut Sor.Sarinya | Rangsit Stadium | Pathum Thani, Thailand | KO (Knees) | 4 | |
| 2017-04-09 | Win | (Thailand) Vinailek Sor.Jor.Vichitpadriew | Rangsit Stadium | Pathum Thani, Thailand | TKO (Doctor Stop/Elbow) | 1 | |
| 2017-03-10 | Win | (Thailand) Monsiam Lukmuangphet | Lumpinee Stadium | Bangkok, Thailand | KO | 4 | |
| 2017-01-29 | Loss | (Thailand) Simanut Sor.Sarinya | Rangsit Stadium | Pathum Thani, Thailand | Decision | 5 | 3:00 |
| 2017-01-08 | Win | (Thailand) Phetsaifah Sor.Jor.Vichitpadriew | Rangsit Stadium | Pathum Thani, Thailand | Decision | 5 | 3:00 |
| 2016-12-11 | Win | (Thailand) Taksila Chor.Hapayak | Rangsit Stadium | Pathum Thani, Thailand | KO | 4 | |
| 2016-09-18 | Win | (Thailand) Fahnimit Wiriyafarm | Rangsit Stadium | Pathum Thani, Thailand | Decision | 5 | 3:00 |
| 2016-08-26 | Win | (Thailand) Mongkol Kor.Kampanath | Lumpinee Stadium | Bangkok, Thailand | Decision | 5 | 3:00 |
| 2016-05-17 | Loss | (Thailand) Mongkonngoen Aesapansung | Lumpinee Stadium | Bangkok, Thailand | KO | 3 | |
| 2016-04-05 | Win | (Thailand) Hapayak Sitpupantoo | Lumpinee Stadium | Bangkok, Thailand | Decision | 5 | 3:00 |
| 2016-03-14 | Win | (Thailand) Lotus Tor.Tewin | Rajadamnern Stadium | Bangkok, Thailand | Decision | 5 | 3:00 |
| 2016-02-13 | Win | (Thailand) Fahmeta Tambangsai | Lumpinee Stadium | Bangkok, Thailand | Decision | 5 | 3:00 |
| 2016-01-09 | Loss | (Thailand) Fahmeta Tambangsai | Lumpinee Stadium | Bangkok, Thailand | Decision | 5 | 3:00 |
| 2015-11-24 | Win | (Thailand) Sakmongkol Sor.Sommai | Lumpinee Stadium | Bangkok, Thailand | KO | 3 | |
| 2015-06-06 | Loss | (Thailand) Bigball Changchana | Siam Omnoi Boxing Stadium | Samut Sakhon, Thailand | Decision | 5 | 3:00 |
| 2015-05-15 | Win | (Thailand) Petchtaksin Banklongprapimon | Lumpinee Stadium | Bangkok, Thailand | Decision | 5 | 3:00 |
| 2015-03-24 | Win | (Thailand) Kongkrai Sitboonmee | Lumpinee Stadium | Bangkok, Thailand | Decision | 5 | 3:00 |
| 2015-02-10 | Win | (Thailand) Numsurin Chor.Ketveena | Lumpinee Stadium | Bangkok, Thailand | Decision | 5 | 3:00 |
| 2015-01-16 | Loss | (Thailand) Numsurin Chor.Ketveena | Lumpinee Stadium | Bangkok, Thailand | KO | 4 | |
Legend: Win Loss Draw/No contest Notes

Amateur Muay Thai Record
| Date | Result | Opponent | Event | Location | Method | Round | Time |
|---|---|---|---|---|---|---|---|
| 2024-06-09 | Loss | (Russia) Konstantin Shakhtarin | IFMA 2024 World Championships, Tournament Final | Patras, Greece | Decision (30:27) | 3 | 3:0 |
Wins the 2024 IFMA World Championships −71kg Silver Medal.
| 2024-06-07 | Win | (Italy) Gianluca Franzosi | IFMA 2024 World Championships, Tournament Semifinals | Patras, Greece | Decision (30:27) | 3 | 3:00 |
| 2024-06-06 | Win | (Taipei) Jin-Cheng Lin | IFMA 2024 World Championships, Tournament Quarterfinals | Patras, Greece | TKO | 2 | |
| 2024-06-04 | Win | (Syria) Allaa Ahmad Abo Jeesh | IFMA 2024 World Championships, Tournament First Round | Patras, Greece | Walk over | | |
| 2023-10-30 | Loss | (Russia) Konstantin Shakhtarin | 2023 World Combat Games, Grand Final | Riyadh, Saudi Arabia | Decision (30:27) | 3 | 3:00 |
Wins the 2023 World Combat Games Muay Thai −71kg Silver Medal.
| 2023-10-29 | Win | (France) Dany Njiba | 2023 World Combat Games, Loser bracket Final | Riyadh, Saudi Arabia | Decision (30:27) | 3 | 3:00 |
| 2023-10-29 | Loss | (Russia) Konstantin Shakhtarin | 2023 World Combat Games, Winner bracket Semifinals | Riyadh, Saudi Arabia | Decision (30:27) | 3 | 3:00 |
| 2023-10-28 | Win | (Kazakhstan) Ruslan Zayakin | 2023 World Combat Games, Winner bracket Quarterfinals | Riyadh, Saudi Arabia | Decision (30:27) | 3 | 3:00 |
| 2022-07-17 | Win | (Ukraine) Oleksandr Yefimenko | IFMA at the 2022 World Games, Final | Birmingham, Alabama, United States | Decision (30:27) | 3 | 3:00 |
Wins 2022 World Games IFMA Muay Thai -71kg Gold medal.
| 2022-07-16 | Win | (Morocco) Abdelali Zahidi | IFMA at the 2022 World Games, Semi Finals | Birmingham, Alabama, United States | Walk Over | | |
| 2022-07-15 | Win | (Israel) Itay Gershon | IFMA at the 2022 World Games, Quarter Finals | Birmingham, Alabama, United States | Decision (30:29) | 3 | 3:00 |
| 2021-12-10 | Loss | (France) Jimmy Vienot | 2021 IFMA World Championships, Semi Finals | Bangkok, Thailand | Decision (30:27) | 3 | |
Wins 2021 IFMA World Championships -71kg Bronze medal.
| 2021-12-09 | Win | (Poland) Mateusz Różak | 2021 IFMA World Championships, Quarter Finals | Bangkok, Thailand | TKO (Knee) | | |
| 2019-07-28 | Win | (Hungary) Spéth Norbert Attila | 2019 IFMA World Championships, Final | Bangkok, Thailand | Decision | 3 | 3:00 |
Wins 2019 IFMA World Championships -67kg Gold medal.
| 2019-07-27 | Win | (Turkey) Erdem Taha Dincer | 2019 IFMA World Championships, Semi Finals | Bangkok, Thailand | Decision | 3 | 3:00 |
| 2019-07-26 | Win | (Israel) Itai Gayer | 2019 IFMA World Championships, Quarter Finals | Bangkok, Thailand | Decision | 3 | 3:00 |
| 2019-07-24 | Win | (Sweden) Freddy Gonzalez Castro | 2019 IFMA World Championships, Round 2 | Bangkok, Thailand | TKO | 2 | |
| 2019-07-22 | Win | (Slovenia) Saso Vorkapic | 2019 IFMA World Championships, Round 1 | Bangkok, Thailand | Decision | 3 | 3:00 |
Legend: Win Loss Draw/No contest Notes

== Professional boxing record ==
| 1 fight | 0 wins | 1 loss |
|---|---|---|
| By decision | 0 | 1 |

| No. | Result | Record | Opponent | Type | Round, time | Date | Location | Notes |
|---|---|---|---|---|---|---|---|---|
| 1 | Loss | 0–1 | (Thailand) Apichit Pimsen | UD | 3 | 23 Nov 2019 | Suamlum Night Bazaar, Ratchadaphisek, Bangkok, Thailand | |
