= Yodpanomrung Jitmuangnon =

- Born: Klumya Akephon; April 30, 1993 (age 33); Udon Thani, Thailand
- Other names: The Lightning Knee, Yodpanomrung SBP CarNetwork
- Nationality: Thai
- Height: 177 cm (5 ft 9 1/2 in)
- Weight: 65.5 kg (144 lb; 10.31 st)
- Style: Muay Khao
- Fighting out of: Bangkok, Thailand
- Team: Jitmuangnon

Kickboxing record
- Total: 304
- Wins: 232
- Losses: 70
- Draws: 2

Yodpanomrung Jitmuangnon (ยอดพนมรุ้ง จิตรเมืองนนท์) is a retired Muay Thai fighter.

== Titles and accomplishments ==
- Channel 7 Boxing Stadium
  - 2016 Channel 7 Boxing Stadium 140 lbs Champion
  - 2014 Channel 7 Stadium Fight of the Year (vs Littewada Sitthikul)
- Omnoi Stadium
  - 2015 Omnoi Stadium 135 lbs Champion
- World Muay Thai Council
  - 2016 WMC World 140 lbs Champion
- Professional Boxing Association of Thailand (PAT)
  - 2016 Champion of Thailand 135 lbs
- International Muay Thai Council
  - 2019 IMC Welterweight Champion
- IFMA World Muaythai Championships
  - 2012 IFMA World Championships -63.5 kg (gold)

== Fight record ==
232 Wins , 70 Losses , 2 Draws
Date	Result	Opponent	Event	Location	Method	Round	Time
2020-09-18	Loss	(Brazil) Felipe Lobo	ONE Championship: A New Breed 3	Bangkok, Thailand	Decision (split)	3	3:00
2020-01-24	Win	(Thailand) Thananchai Rachanon	Lumpinee Stadium	Bangkok, Thailand	Decision	5	3:00
Wins IMC Welterweight Title.
2019-12-19	Loss	(Thailand) Chamuaktong Fightermuaythai	Rajadamnern Stadium	Bangkok, Thailand	Decision	5	3:00
2019-10-15	Loss	(Thailand) Thananchai Rachanon	Lumpinee Stadium	Bangkok, Thailand	TKO (Doctor Stoppage/Elbows)	4	
2019-09-12	Loss	(Thailand) Sangmanee Sor Tienpo	Rajadamnern Stadium	Bangkok, Thailand	Decision	5	3:00
2019-07-26	Loss	(France) Rafi Bohic		Hatyai, Thailand	Decision	5	3:00
2019-05-23	Win	(Thailand) Muangthai PKSaenchaimuaythaigym	Rajadamnern Stadium	Bangkok, Thailand	Decision	5	3:00
2019-05-18	Win	(England) Tyler Hardcastle	ONE Championship 94: For Honor	Jakarta, Indonesia	KO	3	2:11
2019-04-11	Win	(Thailand) Thaksinlek Kiatniwat	Rajadamnern Stadium	Bangkok, Thailand	Decision	5	3:00
2019-03-07	Win	(Thailand) Thaksinlek Kiatniwat	Rajadamnern Stadium	Bangkok, Thailand	Decision	5	3:00
2019-01-31	Win	(Thailand) Rambo J.PowerRoofSamui	Rajadamnern Stadium	Bangkok, Thailand	Decision	5	3:00
2018-11-15	Win	(Thailand) Phonek Or.Kwanmuang	Rajadamnern Stadium	Bangkok, Thailand	Decision	5	3:00
2018-10-10	Loss	(Thailand) Chamuaktong Fightermuaythai	Rajadamnern Stadium	Bangkok, Thailand	Decision	5	3:00
For the Rajadamnern Stadium 140lbs Title.
2018-09-22	Loss	(France) Fabrice Delannon	ONE Championship: Conquest of Heroes	Jakarta, Indonesia	Decision (split)	3	3:00
2018-08-07	Win	(Thailand) Sangmanee Sor Tienpo		Songkhla, Thailand	Decision	5	3:00
2018-07-14	Loss	(Thailand) Panpayak Sitchefboontham	Rajadamnern Stadium	Bangkok, Thailand	Decision	5	3:00
2018-06-14	Loss	(Thailand) Panpayak Sitchefboontham	Rajadamnern Stadium	Bangkok, Thailand	Decision	5	3:00
2018-05-17	Draw	(Thailand) Yodlekpet Or. Pitisak	Rajadamnern Stadium	Bangkok, Thailand	Decision	5	3:00
2018-03-17	Win	(China) Han Zihao	Top King World Series	Thailand	Decision	3	3:00
2018-02-10	Win	(Brazil) Julio Lobo	Top King World Series 17	China	Decision	3	3:00
2018-01-17	Win	(Thailand) Thananchai Rachanon		Thailand	Decision	5	3:00
2017-12-29	Loss	(Thailand) Chamuaktong Fightermuaythai	Lumpinee Stadium	Bangkok, Thailand	Decision	5	3:00
2017-11-06	Loss	(Thailand) Chamuaktong Fightermuaythai	Rajadamnern Stadium	Bangkok, Thailand	Decision	5	3:00
For the vacant Rajadamnern Stadium 140 lbs Title.
2017-09-05	Loss	(Thailand) Phetmorakot Petchyindee Academy	Rajadamnern Stadium	Bangkok, Thailand	Decision	5	3:00
2017-08-05	Win	(Brazil) Jose Neto	Topking World Series 15	Thailand	Extra Round Decision	4	3:00
2017-07-09	Win	(China) Guo Lizheng	Topking World Series	China	Decision	3	3:00
2017-06-05	Win	(Thailand) Chamuaktong Fightermuaythai	Rajadamnern Stadium	Bangkok, Thailand	Decision	5	3:00
2017-05-03	Loss	(Thailand) Thaksinlek Kiatniwat	Rajadamnern Stadium	Bangkok, Thailand	Decision	5	3:00
2017-04-06	Loss	(Thailand) Phetmorakot Petchyindee Academy	Rajadamnern Stadium	Bangkok, Thailand	Decision	5	3:00
2017-03-07	Win	(Thailand) Littewada Sitthikul	Lumpinee Stadium	Bangkok, Thailand	Decision	5	3:00
2017-02-12	Loss	(Thailand) Chujaroen Dabransarakarm	Channel 7 Boxing Stadium	Bangkok, Thailand	Decision	5	3:00
Loses the Channel 7 Boxing Stadium 140 lbs Title.
2016-12-09	Win	(Thailand) Muangthai PKSaenchaimuaythaigym	Lumpinee Stadium	Bangkok, Thailand	Decision	5	3:00
Wins the Thailand 135lbs Title.
2016-11-16	Win	(Thailand) Rambo Petphokhao	Lumpinee Stadium	Bangkok, Thailand	Decision	5	3:00
2016-10-06	Loss	(Thailand) Chamuaktong Fightermuaythai	Rajadamnern Stadium	Bangkok, Thailand	Decision	5	3:00
2016-09-05	Loss	(Thailand) Phetmorakot Petchyindee Academy	Rajadamnern Stadium	Bangkok, Thailand	Decision	5	3:00
2016-07-31	Win	(Thailand) Littewada Sitthikul	Channel 7 Boxing Stadium	Bangkok, Thailand	Decision	5	3:00
Defends the Channel 7 Boxing Stadium 140lbs Title.
2016-06-28	Loss	(Thailand) Rambo Petphokhao	Lumpinee Stadium	Bangkok, Thailand	Decision	5	3:00
2016-06-03	Win	(Thailand) Littewada Sitthikul	Lumpinee Stadium	Bangkok, Thailand	Decision	5	3:00
Wins the WMC World 140lbs Title.
2016-05-02	Win	(Thailand) Rambo Petphokhao	Rajadamnern Stadium	Bangkok, Thailand	Decision	5	3:00
2016-04-07	Loss	(Thailand) Phetmorakot Petchyindee Academy	Rajadamnern Stadium	Bangkok, Thailand	Decision	5	3:00
2016-03-07	Loss	(Thailand) Littewada Sitthikul		Thailand	Decision	5	3:00
2016-01-24	Win	(Thailand) Sittisak Petpayathai	Channel 7 Boxing Stadium	Bangkok, Thailand	Decision	5	3:00
Wins vacant Channel 7 Boxing Stadium 135 lbs title.
2015-12-22	Win	(Thailand) Chujaroen Dabransarakarm	Lumpinee Stadium	Bangkok, Thailand	Decision	5	3:00
2015-11-09	Win	(Thailand) Chamuaktong Fightermuaythai	Rajadamnern Stadium	Bangkok, Thailand	Decision	5	3:00
2015-10-05	Loss	(Thailand) Chujaroen Dabransarakarm	Rajadamnern Stadium	Bangkok, Thailand	Decision	5	3:00
2015-09-04	Loss	(Thailand) Chujaroen Dabransarakarm	Lumpinee Stadium	Bangkok, Thailand	Decision	5	3:00
For the vacant Lumpinee Stadium Lightweight (135 lbs) title.
2015-08-06	Draw	(Thailand) Chamuaktong Fightermuaythai	Rajadamnern Stadium	Bangkok, Thailand	Decision	5	3:00
2015-06-30	Win	(Thailand) Kaoyod PK.Saenchaimuaythai	Lumpinee Stadium	Bangkok, Thailand	Decision	5	3:00
2015-06-05	Win	(Thailand) Littewada Sitthikul	Lumpinee Stadium	Bangkok, Thailand	TKO	4	
2015-04-10	Win	(Thailand) Chujaroen Dabransarakarm	Lumpinee Stadium	Bangkok, Thailand	Decision	5	3:00
2015-01-15	Loss	(Thailand) Kongsak Saenchaimuaythaigym	Rajadamnern Stadium	Bangkok, Thailand	Decision	5	3:00
2014-09-21	Win	(Thailand) Littewada Sitthikul	Channel 7 Boxing Stadium	Bangkok, Thailand	Decision	5	3:00
2014-08-08	Loss	(Thailand) Panpetch Kiayjarernchai	Lumpinee Stadium	Bangkok, Thailand	Decision (unanimous)	5	3:00
2014-06-06	Loss	(Thailand) Sagetdao Petpayathai	Lumpinee Stadium	Bangkok, Thailand	Decision (unanimous)	5	3:00
2014-05-02	Win	(Thailand) Sagetdao Petpayathai	Lumpinee Stadium	Bangkok, Thailand	Decision (unanimous)	5	3:00
2014-04-08	Win	(Thailand) Sittisak Petpayathai	Lumpinee Stadium	Bangkok, Thailand	KO	5	
2014-02-09	Win	(Thailand) Saksongkram Popteeratam		Thailand	KO		
2012-08-22	Win	(Thailand) Saengomorakot Chuwattana	Rajadamnern Stadium	Bangkok, Thailand	Decision	5	3:00
2011-12-09	Loss	(Thailand) Thongchai Sitsongpeenong		Thailand	Decision	5	3:00
2011-06-12	Win	(Thailand) Addtevada Wor wiwattananon	Channel 7 Boxing Stadium	Bangkok, Thailand	TKO	4	
	Win	(Thailand) Singpayak Mor. Rajaphat Moo Barn Chombueng	Channel 7 Boxing Stadium	Bangkok, Thailand	Decision	5	3:00
Legend: Win Loss Draw/No contest Notes

Amateur Record
Date	Result	Opponent	Event	Location	Method	Round	Time
2012-09-13	Win	(Ukraine) Igor Liubchenko	IFMA World Championships 2012, Final	Saint-Petersburg, Russia	Decision	3	2:00
Wins 2012 IFMA World Championships -63.5kg Gold Medal.
2012-09-11	Win	(Belarus) Dmitry Varats	IFMA World Championships 2012, Semi Final	Saint-Petersburg, Russia			
2012-09-10	Win		IFMA World Championships 2012, Quarter Final	Saint-Petersburg, Russia			
2012-09-	Win	(Russia) Zaur Abdulsalamov	IFMA World Championships 2012, 1/8 Final	Saint-Petersburg, Russia			
Legend: Win Loss Draw/No contest Notes
