= Julio Lobo (Muay Thai) =

Brazilian Muay Thai fighter

- Born: Julio César Casanova Lobo Silva Ferreira; June 10, 1994 (age 32); São Vicente, Brazil
- Other names: Lobo PhuketFightClub
- Height: 1.80 m (5 ft 11 in)
- Weight: 67 kg (148 lb; 10.6 st)
- Fighting out of: Phuket, Thailand
- Team: Phuket Fight Club; Cazolari Boxing (former)

Kickboxing record
- Total: 96
- Wins: 66
- By knockout: 34
- Losses: 28
- Draws: 2

Julio Lobo (born June 10, 1994) is a Brazilian Muay Thai fighter. As of September 2026, he is currently ranked #9 in the world at 147 lbs by the WBC Muay Thai rankings.

== Career ==
=== Early career ===
Early on in his career he managed to win the FEPLAM −63.5 kg Champion, the 2018 Toyota Marathon 140 lbs Tournament Champion and fought for the WPMF title thrice.

=== WBC Muay Thai ===
In 2018, Lobo fought for the WBC Muay Thai 65 kg world title against Manachai and lost by decision.

=== Glory ===
In August 2018, Lobo fought in Glory against Khayal Dzhaniev losing by decision. His record after the fight was 41 wins with 26 knockouts and 12 losses.

In 2019 Lobo was scheduled to fight Thong Fairtex but the fight was cancelled. In 2020 Lobo was scheduled to fight River Daz but the fight was cancelled.

=== Toyota Revo Marathon 140 lbs Tournament ===
Lobo defeated Felipe Gois in the semi finals, in the final fought against Savvas Michael and lost by decision.

=== Non title fights against world champions ===
Between 2019 and 2020 Lobo managed to grab wins against world champions such as Manachai, Pakorn P.K. Saenchai Muaythaigym, Shadow Tor.Thepsutin in which he would rematch to a draw and lose the trilogy. In October 2020, he defeated Panpayak Sitchefboontham.

=== Omnoi Stadium ===
In 2021, Lobo defeated Rambo Phet.Por.Tor.Aor becoming the third foreigner to win the Siam Omnoi Stadium Welterweight title.

=== World Title Fights ===
In March 2022, Lobo fought for the vacant Rajadamnern Stadium 147 lbs title against Shadow Singmawynn and lost by decision. In May 2022, Lobo fought for the WBC Muaythai Welterweight World Title against Sajad Sattari losing by decision.

=== Non title fights against world champions ===
In July 2022, Lobo lost against Yodkhunpon Sitmonchai by knockout and same year in September he knocked out PhetUtong Or.Kwanmuang.

=== ONE FC ===
In September 2023, Lobo lost against Superball by decision and two months later defeated Kaonar by knockout.

In February 2024, Lobo lost by a three knockdown rule in the first round against Ratchasiesan Laochokcharoen.

In November 2025, Lobo won a decision against Worapon Kiatchachanan.

In May 2026, Lobo won a decision against Kongklai AnnyMuayThai.

In June 2026, The Brazilian striker stopped Thai veteran PTT Apichart Farm by TKO in their bantamweight Muay Thai bout at The Inner Circle 20 on Friday, June 26, live from Bangkok's iconic Lumpinee Stadium. Lobo was knocked down early but showed tremendous resilience to rally and secure the biggest victory of his career. His impressive performance not only marked the most significant win of his career but also earned him a performance bonus.

In September 2026, Julio Lobo fought Ferrari Fairtex and landed a clean uppercut in the third round but Ferrari managed to stay on his feet, regain his composure and make it to the final bell, earning a split-decision victory against Lobo at The Inner Circle 30. Speaking backstage to the Bangkok Post through an interpreter, Ferrari admitted that he briefly felt disoriented after the punch. Still, he focused on staying upright and reminded himself not to go down until the final bell sounded.

== Championships and awards ==
- 2013 FEPLAM −63.5 kg Champion
- 2018 Toyota Marathon 140 lbs Tournament Champion
- 2021 Omnoi Stadium 147 lbs Champion

== Fight record ==
Professional Muay Thai & kickboxing record
66 wins (34 (T)KO's), 29 losses, 3 Draws
Date	Result	Opponent	Event	Location	Method	Round	Time
2026-09-11	Loss	(Thailand) Ferrari Fairtex	ONE The Inner Circle 30, Lumpinee Stadium	Bangkok, Thailand	Decision (Split)	3	3:00
2026-06-26	Win	(Thailand) PTT Petchrungruang	ONE The Inner Circle 22, Lumpinee Stadium	Bangkok, Thailand	TKO (Punches)	2	2:01
2026-05-01	Win	(Thailand) Kongklai Sor.Sommai	ONE Friday Fights 152, Lumpinee Stadium	Bangkok, Thailand	Decision (Unanimous)	3	3:00
2025-12-29	Loss	(Thailand) Petchthongchai Sor.Sommai	Phetchbuncha Stadium 21st Anniversary show	Ko Samui, Thailand	Decision	5	3:00
2025-11-28	Win	(Thailand) Worapon Lukjaoporongtom	ONE Friday Fights 135, Lumpinee Stadium	Bangkok, Thailand	Decision (Unanimous)	3	3:00
2025-09-15	Win	(Turkey) Gokhan	Phetchbuncha Stadium	Phuket, Thailand	KO (Elbow)		
2025-08-11	Win	(Thailand) Simanut Sor.Sarinya	Phetchbuncha Stadium	Phuket, Thailand	TKO	1	
2024-06-22	Loss	(Italy) Alessandro Sara	Jimuangnon	Bangkok, Thailand	TKO	5	
2024-04-27	Draw	(Italy) Alessandro Sara	Sinbi Stadium	Phuket, Thailand	Decision	5	3:00
2024-02-16	Loss	(Thailand) Kulabdam Sor.Jor.Piek-U-Thai	ONE Friday Fights 52, Lumpinee Stadium	Bangkok, Thailand	TKO (3 Knockdowns)	1	2:36
2023-11-24	Win	(Thailand) Kaonar P.K. Saenchai Muaythaigym	ONE Friday Fights 42, Lumpinee Stadium	Bangkok, Thailand	KO (Punches)	3	0:46
2023-10-06	Loss	(Thailand) Superball Tded99	ONE Friday Fights 36, Lumpinee Stadium	Bangkok, Thailand	Decision (Unanimous)	3	3:00
2023-07-29	Win	(Italy) Alessandro Sara	9 Muaydee VitheeThai, Jitmuangnon Stadium	Thailand	Decision	5	3:00
2022-11-05	Win	(Thailand) Darky NokKhao-GorMor.11	Samui Super Fight, Phetchbuncha Stadium	Ko Samui, Thailand	Decision	5	3:00
2022-09-23	Win	(Thailand) PhetUtong Or.Kwanmuang	Muay Thai Lumpinee Pitaktam, Lumpinee Stadium	Bangkok, Thailand	KO (Elbow)	2	
2022-07-22	Loss	(Thailand) Yodkhunpon Sitmonchai	Rajadamnern World Series	Bangkok, Thailand	KO (Left hook)	2	
2022-06-16	Loss	(Thailand) Yodkompatak SinbiMuayThai	Singpaong, Patong Stadium	Phuket, Thailand	Decision	5	3:00
2022-05-14	Loss	(Iran) Sajad Sattari	Venum Fight, Rajadamnern Stadium	Bangkok, Thailand	Decision	5	3:00
For the WBC Muaythai Welterweight World Title.
2022-03-21	Loss	(Thailand) Shadow Singmawynn	Singmawin, Rajadamnern Stadium	Bangkok, Thailand	Decision	5	3:00
For the vacant Rajadamnern Stadium 147 lbs title.
2022-01-09	Win	(Thailand) Saensiri J.PowerRoofPhuket	Muay Thai Super Champ	Phuket, Thailand	Decision	3	3:00
2021-07-03	Win	(Thailand) Rambo J.PowerRoofSamui	SuekJaoMuayThai, Fonjang Chonburi Stadium	Chonburi, Thailand	Decision	5	3:00
Wins Omnoi Stadium 147 lbs title
2021-03-19	Win	(Thailand) Yodphupa Bermphudin	Suek Pitakham, Lumpinee Stadium	Bangkok, Thailand	TKO (Ref Stoppage)	4	
2020-12-18	Loss	(Thailand) Littewada Sitthikul	Suk Singmawin	Songkhla, Thailand	KO (left elbow)	2	
2020-11-17	Loss	(Thailand) Phonek Or.Kwanmuang	Sor.Sommai, CentralPlaza Nakhon Ratchasima	Nakhon Ratchasima, Thailand	Decision	5	3:00
2020-10-26	Win	(Thailand) Panpayak Sitchefboontham	Chef Boontham, Rangsit Stadium	Rangsit, Thailand	KO (Elbows)	3	
2020-09-10	Win	(Thailand) Prabsuek Siopol	Sor.Sommai Birthday, Rajadamnern Stadium	Bangkok, Thailand	Decision	5	3:00
2020-08-13	Loss	(Thailand) Tapaokaew Singmawynn	Singmawin, Rajadamnern Stadium	Bangkok, Thailand	Decision	5	3:00
2020-07-12	Loss	(Thailand) Shadow Tor.Thepsutin	Or.Tor.Gor 3 Stadium	Nonthaburi, Thailand	Decision	5	3:00
2020-03-06	Draw	(Thailand) Shadow Tor.Thepsutin	Lumpinee Stadium	Bangkok, Thailand	Decision	5	3:00
2020-02-09	Win	(Thailand) Shadow Tor.Thepsutin	Srithammaracha + Kiatpetch Super Fight	Nakhon Si Thammarat, Thailand	Decision	5	3:00
2020-01-04	Win	(Thailand) Bin Parunchai	Lumpinee Stadium	Bangkok, Thailand	KO (Low Kick)	3	
2019-11-02	Win	(Thailand) Pakorn PKSaenchaimuaythaigym	Maximum Muay Thai Fight	São Paulo, Brazil	Decision	5	3:00
2019-08-17	Win	(Thailand) Pinphet Sitdjeadeng	Lumpinee Stadium	Bangkok, Thailand	Decision	5	3:00
2019-07-13	Win	(Thailand) Manachai	Lumpinee Stadium	Bangkok, Thailand	KO (Elbow)	4	0:20
2019-06-15	Loss	(Thailand) Pinpetch Sitjaydaeng	Lumpinee Stadium	Bangkok, Thailand	Decision	5	3:00
2019-05-19	Win	(Thailand) Simanut Sor.Sarinya	Blue Arena	Thailand	KO	1	
2019-02-05	Loss	(Thailand) Kiatpetch SuanArharnPeekmai	Lumpinee Stadium	Bangkok, Thailand	Decision	5	3:00
2018-12-21	Loss	(Cyprus) Savvas Michael	Toyota Revo Marathon Tournament, Final	Songkhla, Thailand	Decision	5	3:00
For the Toyota Revo Marathon 140 lbs Tournament.
2018-12-21	Win	(Brazil) Felipe Gois	Toyota Revo Marathon Tournament, Semi Final	Songkhla, Thailand			
2018-10-29	Loss	(Thailand) Manachai	YOKKAO 34	Hong Kong	Decision	5	3:00
For the WBC Muay Thai World −65kg title.
2018-09-09	Win	(Thailand) Kiatpetch SuanArharnPeekmai	Super Champ	Bangkok, Thailand	TKO (Doctor Stoppage/Elbow)	3	
2018-08-25	Loss	(Russia) Khayal Dzhaniev	Glory 57: Shenzhen	Shenzhen, China	Decision (Unanimous)	3	3:00
2018-06-21	Win	(Thailand) Kundiao Payakampan	Toyota Marathon Tournament, Final	Thailand	KO (Knee to the Body)	1	
Wins Toyota Marathon 140 lbs tournament title
2018-06-21	Win	(Thailand) Jomrachan Bangeuro	Toyota Marathon Tournament, Semi Final	Thailand	KO (Knees)	2	
2018-06-21	Win	(Uzbekistan) Kobilbek Tolabaev	Toyota Marathon Tournament, Quarter Final	Thailand	KO (Knee to the Body)		
2018-04-28	Loss	(Thailand) Taksila Chor Happayak	Phoenix 7	Phuket, Thailand	Decision	3	3:00
2018-02-10	Loss	(Thailand) Yodpanomrung Jitmuangnon	Top King World Series 17	China	Decision	3	3:00
2017-12-16	Loss	(Thailand) Intarachai Thor Thepsutin	WPMF King's Birthday	Bangkok, Thailand	Decision	5	3:00
For the WPMF World 147lbs title.
2017-12-01	Win	(China)		China	Decision	3	3:00
2017-11-11	Win	(France) Flo Singpatong	Pattong Boxing Stadium	Thailand	KO (Low Kick)	3	
2017-09-24	Win	(New Zealand) Deregea	Bangla Boxing Stadium	Thailand			
2017-08-20	Loss	(Thailand) Pakorn PKSaenchaimuaythaigym	All-Star Fight	Bangkok, Thailand	Decision	3	3:00
2017-07-28	Loss	(Thailand) Buakiew Por.Pongsawang	King's Birthday	Thailand	Decision	5	3:00
For the vacant WPMF World 147 lbs title.
2017-06-23	Win	(Brazil) Marlon Singpatong	Lumpinee Stadium	Thailand	Decision	5	3:00
2017-05-14	Win	(China) Li Yankun	Kunlun Fight 61	Sanya, China	Decision	3	3:00
2017-02-18	Win	(Thailand)	Super Muay Thai	Thailand	Decision	5	3:00
2017-02-01	Win	(Thailand) Chalarmakao	Andaman Fight, Final	Phuket, Thailand	TKO	3	
2017-02-01	Win	(Australia) Ryan Sutai MuayThai	Andaman Fight, Semi Final	Phuket, Thailand	Decision	3	3:00
2016-12-24	Loss	(Thailand) Saenchai	Thai Fight	Bangkok, Thailand	Decision	3	3:00
2016-11-19	Win	(Uzbekistan) Anvar Boynazarov	Thai Fight Airrace 1	Ban Chang, Thailand	Decision	3	3:00
2016-09-16	Win	(Uzbekistan)	Bangla Boxing Stadium	Thailand	Decision	5	3:00
2016-08-20	Win	(France) Victor Pinto	Thai Fight Phra Chom Klao Ladkrabang	Bangkok, Thailand	Decision	3	3:00
2016-08-07	Win	(Thailand) Superjoke	Max Muay Thai	Pattaya, Thailand	KO	3	
2016-07-27	Loss	(France) Brian Denis	Prince's Birthday	Bangkok, Thailand	Decision	5	3:00
For the interim WPMF World −135 lbs title.
2016-06	Win	(Brazil) Bruno Marques	Top Thai Brasil IV	Brazil	Decision	3	3:00
Defends FEPLAM −63.5kg title.
2016-05-14	Loss	(Brazil) Luis Cajaiba	Epic Muaythai Brasil 2, Semi Final	São Paulo, Brazil	Decision	3	3:00
2016-03-26	Win	(Brazil) Michael de Oliveira	Thai I Santos Max	São Paulo, Brazil	KO (Low Kick)	2	
2016-02-20	Win	(Brazil) Julio Maximus	Epic Muaythai Brasil, Final	São Paulo, Brazil	Decision	3	3:00
2016-02-20	Win	(Brazil) Alexander Costela	Epic Muaythai Brasil, Semi Final	São Paulo, Brazil	KO (Low Kick)	2	
2015-11-22	Win	(Brazil) Felipe Lobo	Portuários Stadium	Itanhaém, Brazil	KO (Head Kick)	1	
2015-11-07	Win	(Brazil) Jordan Kranio	XI Desafio de Muay Thai	Brazil	KO	3	
2015-09	Loss	(Brazil) Luis Cajaiba	Maximum Muay Thai 2	Brazil	Decision	5	3:00
2015-03	Win	(Brazil) Romulo Augusto	Portuários Stadium	Brazil	Decision	5	3:00
2014-12-14	Win	(Brazil) Cadu Portela	Maximum Muay Thai	Brazil	KO (Elbow)	2	
2014	Win	(Thailand) Fahsathan		Thailand	Decision	3	3:00
2014-10-17	Win	(Republic of Ireland) Martin Avery	Bangla Boxing Stadium	Phuket, Thailand	Decision	5	3:00
2014-10-04	Loss	(China) Wei Rui	Wu Lin Feng 2014	Wenling, China	Decision (Unanimous)	3	3:00
2014-09-22	Win	(Thailand) Aikkewzang	Patong Boxing Stadium	Phuket, Thailand	KO (Knee to the Body)	2	
2014-09-05	Win	(Russia) Vadim SaifaMT	Bangla Boxing Stadium	Phuket, Thailand	TKO (Referee Stoppage/Knee)	2	
2014	Win	(Brazil) Lucas Wallace	FEPLAM	São Paulo, Brazil	TKO	4	
2013-10-05	Win	(Brazil) André Urso	Torneio Revelação, Final	São Paulo, Brazil	Decision	3	3:00
Wins FEPLAM −63.5kg title.
2013-10-05	Win	(Brazil) Ricardo Pacheco	Torneio Revelação, Semi Final	São Paulo, Brazil	Decision	3	3:00
2012-11-12	Win	(Brazil) Lucas Salompas	Invictus Muay Thai II	Brazil	Decision	3	3:00
Legend: Win Loss Draw/No contest Notes
