= Kongsak P.K.Saenchaimuaythaigym =

Thai fighter

Kongsak P.K. Saenchai Muaythai Gym
- Born: Kumpol Sutti; November 12, 1990 (age 35); Prakhon Chai, Buriram, Thailand
- Native name: กำพล สุทธิ
- Other names: Kongsak Sitboonmee
- Nickname: Left Highway (ซ้ายทางด่วน); Left of Great Destruction (ซ้ายมหาประลัย)
- Height: 170 cm (5 ft 7 in)
- Division: Featherweight; Super Featherweight; Lightweight
- Style: Muay Thai (Muay Femur)
- Stance: Southpaw
- Fighting out of: Bangkok, Thailand
- Team: Sitboonmee Gym; P.K. Saenchai Muay Thai Gym (since 2013)
- Years active: c. 2000-2022

Kickboxing record
- Total: 225
- Wins: 163
- By knockout: 16
- Losses: 60
- Draws: 2

Other information
- Notable relatives: Changpuek Kiatsongrit (uncle)

Kumpol Sutti (Thai: กำพล สุทธิ; born November 12, 1990), known professionally as Kongsak Sitboonmee or Kongsak P.K.Saenchaimuaythaigym (Thai: ก้องศักดิ์ ศิษย์บุญมี, ก้องศักดิ์ พี.เค.แสนชัยมวยไทยยิม), is a Thai retired Muay Thai fighter. He was a three-time Lumpinee Stadium champion across two divisions and the 2010 Sports Writers Association of Thailand Fighter of the Year. Nicknamed "Left of Great Destruction", he was especially known for his powerful middle kicks.

He holds wins over fighters such as Nong-O Kaiyanghadaogym, Pornsanae Sitmonchai, Pakorn PKSaenchaimuaythaigym and Jomthong Chuwattana.

== Career ==
Kongsak started training at age of 9, having been discovered by his famous uncle Changpuek Kiatsongrit. He joined the Sitboonmee camp at the age of 11 and trained and fought for the same camp until 2013, when he moved to the PKSaenchaimuaythaigym camp.

== Titles and accomplishments ==
- Lumpinee Stadium
  - 2013 Lumpinee Stadium Super Featherweight (130 lbs) Champion
  - 2011 Lumpinee Stadium Super Featherweight (130 lbs) Champion
  - 2010 Lumpinee Stadium Featherweight (126 lbs) Champion
- World Muaythai Council
  - 2011 WMC 132lbs. Champion
- Professional Boxing Association of Thailand
  - 2010 Thailand Featherweight (126 lbs) Champion
- Sports Writers Association of Thailand
  - 2010 Sports Writers Association of Thailand Fighter of the Year

== Fight record ==
Kickboxing record
164 Wins, 61 Losses, 2 Draws
Date	Result	Opponent	Event	Location	Method	Round	Time
2022-11-04	Loss	(Russia) Ilyas Musaev	Rajadamnern World Series	Bangkok, Thailand	KO (High kick)	1	2:40
2022-08-26	Win	(Thailand) Klasuek VenumMuayThai	Rajadamnern World Series	Bangkok, Thailand	KO (Elbow)	2	1:42
2021-12-05	Loss	(France) Jeremy Payet	Muay Thai Grand Prix France	Paris, France	Decision	3	3:00
2019-11-08	Win	(China) Han Zihao	ONE Championship: Masters of Fate	Manila, Philippines	Decision (Unanimous)	3	3:00
2019-06-14	Loss	(Thailand) Rambo Pet.Por.Tor.Or	Phetchachara	Ubon Ratchathani province, Thailand	Decision	5	3:00
2019-02-16	Win	(Russia) Alaverdi Ramazanov	ONE Championship: Clash of Legends	Bangkok, Thailand	Decision (Split)	3	3:00
2018-11-13	Loss	(France) Rafi Bohic	Lumpinee Stadium	Thailand	TKO	3	3:00
2018-09-16	Win	(Thailand) Rambo J.PowerRoofSamui	MuayThai 7 see, Channel 7 Stadium	Bangkok, Thailand	Decision	5	3:00
2018-04-21	Win	(Romania) Daniel Ghercioiu	THAI FIGHT Rome	Rome, Italy	KO (Left High Kick + Left Punch)	2	
2018-03-24	Win	(Algeria) Sif El Islam	THAI FIGHT Mueang Khon 2018	Nakhon Si Thammarat, Thailand	KO (Left Cross to the Body)	1	
2018-01-27	Win	(United States) Arthur Sorsor	THAI FIGHT Bangkok	Bangkok, Thailand	KO (Left Elbow)	2	
2017-09-30	Loss	(Spain) Marc Dass Rey	THAI FIGHT Barcelona	Barcelona, Spain	Decision	3	3:00
2017-07-15	Win	(Iran) Vahid Shahbazi	THAI FIGHT We Love Yala	Yala, Thailand	KO (Left Cross)	1	
2017-05-31	Win	(Thailand) Phonek Or.Kwanmuang	Sor.Sommai, Rajadamnern Stadium	Bangkok, Thailand	Decision	5	3:00
2017-04-29	Win	(Republic of Ireland) Sean Clancy	THAI FIGHT Samui 2017	Ko Samui, Thailand	KO (Left Cross)	1	
2016-11-24	Loss	(Thailand) Petpanomrung Kiatmuu9	Rajadamnern Stadium	Bangkok, Thailand	Decision	5	3:00
2016-10-30	Win	(Japan) Shingo Yamato		Japan	KO (head kick)	4	
2016-09-24	Win	(Thailand) Indrachai Chor Haphayak	Thai Rath TV	Bangkok, Thailand	KO (elbow)	5	3:00
2016-06-09	Win	(Thailand) Kaiwanlek Tor Laksong	Rajadamnern Stadium	Bangkok, Thailand	KO (punch)	3	
2016-05-05	Loss	(Thailand) Yodlekpet Or. Pitisak	Rajadamnern Stadium	Bangkok, Thailand	Decision	5	3:00
2016-04-04	Loss	(Thailand) Kiatpet Suanahanpeekmai	Rajadamnern Stadium	Bangkok, Thailand	Decision	5	3:00
2015-06-30	Loss	(Thailand) Chujaroen Dabransarakarm	Lumpinee Stadium	Bangkok, Thailand	Decision	5	3:00
2015-05-10	Win	(Japan) Tetsuya Yamato	NJKF	Japan	Decision	5	3:00
2015-04-26	Win	(Thailand) Petchboonchu FA Group	Rangsit Stadium	Bangkok, Thailand	Decision	5	3:00
2015-01-15	Win	(Thailand) Yodpanomrung Jitmuangnon	Rajadamnern Stadium	Bangkok, Thailand	Decision	5	3:00
2014-09-11	Loss	(Thailand) Saeksan Or. Kwanmuang	Rajadamnern Stadium	Bangkok, Thailand	Decision	5	3:00
2014-08-08	Win	(Thailand) Penake Sitnumnoi	Lumpinee Stadium	Bangkok, Thailand	Decision	5	3:00
2014-07-08	Win	(Thailand) Phetmorakot wor sangprapai	Lumpinee Stadium	Bangkok, Thailand	Decision	5	3:00
2014-06-06	Win	(Thailand) Penake Sitnumnoi	Lumpinee Stadium	Bangkok, Thailand	Decision	5	3:00
2014-05-08	Draw	(Thailand) Phetmorakot wor sangprapai	Rajadamnern Stadium	Bangkok, Thailand	Decision	5	3:00
2014-02-18	Win	(Thailand) Denpanom Ror Kilacorat	Lumpinee Stadium	Bangkok, Thailand	KO(Left Elbow)	5	3:00
2014-01-07	Loss	(Thailand) Singdam Kiatmuu9	Rajadamnern Stadium	Bangkok, Thailand	Decision	5	3:00
2013-12-03	Loss	(Thailand) Pakorn PKSaenchaimuaythaigym	Lumpinee Stadium	Bangkok, Thailand	Decision	5	3:00
For the Thailand Lightweight (135 lbs) title.
2013-10-11	Loss	(Thailand) Saenchai PKSaenchaimuaythaigym	Lumpinee Stadium	Bangkok, Thailand	Decision	5	3:00
2013-09-04	Loss	(Thailand) Saenchai PKSaenchaimuaythaigym	Rajadamnern Stadium	Bangkok, Thailand	Decision	5	3:00
2013-08-08	Loss	(Thailand) Saenchai PKSaenchaimuaythaigym	Rajadamnern Stadium	Bangkok, Thailand	Decision	5	3:00
2013-07-12	Win	(Thailand) Petchboonchu FA Group	Lumpinee Stadium	Bangkok, Thailand	Decision	5	3:00
2013-06-07	Win	(Thailand) Petpanomrung Kiatmuu9	Lumpinee Stadium	Bangkok, Thailand	Decision	5	3:00
Won the vacant Lumpinee Stadium Super Featherweight (130 lbs) title.
2013-04-09	Loss	(Thailand) Nong-O Kaiyanghadaogym	Lumpinee Stadium	Bangkok, Thailand	Decision	5	3:00
2012-12-24	Win	(Thailand) Singtongnoi Por.Telakun	Rajadamnern Stadium	Bangkok, Thailand	Decision	5	3:00
2012-11-09	Loss	(Thailand) Yodwicha Por Boonsit	Lumpinee Stadium	Bangkok, Thailand	Decision	5	3:00
For the vacant Lumpinee Stadium Super Featherweight (130 lbs) title.
2012-10-11	Win	(Thailand) Yodwicha Por Boonsit	Rajadamnern Stadium	Bangkok, Thailand	Decision	5	3:00
2012-09-12	Win	(Thailand) Saeksan Or. Kwanmuang	Rajadamnern Stadium	Bangkok, Thailand	Decision	5	3:00
2012-05-17	Win	(Thailand) Phetek Kiatyongyut	Rajadamnern Stadium	Bangkok, Thailand	Decision	5	3:00
2012-03-30	Win	(Thailand) Pettawee Sor Kittichai	South Thailand	Thailand	KO	3	
2012-02-28	Loss	(Thailand) Pakorn PKSaenchaimuaythaigym	Lumpinee Stadium	Bangkok, Thailand	Decision	5	3:00
2012-01-26	Loss	(Thailand) Pakorn PKSaenchaimuaythaigym	Rajadamnern Stadium	Bangkok, Thailand	Decision	5	3:00
2011-12-22	Win	(Thailand) Jomthong Chuwattana	Rajadamnern Stadium	Bangkok, Thailand	Decision	5	3:00
2011-09-06	Loss	(Thailand) F-16 Rachanon	Lumpinee Stadium	Bangkok, Thailand	Decision	5	3:00
Loses the Lumpinee Stadium Super Featherweight (130 lbs) title.
2011-08-02	Win	(Thailand) F-16 Rachanon	Lumpinee Stadium	Bangkok, Thailand	Decision	5	3:00
2011-07-07	Loss	(Thailand) Saenchai PKSaenchaimuaythaigym	Rajadamnern Stadium	Bangkok, Thailand	Decision	5	3:00
2011-06-10	Win	(Thailand) Nong-O Kaiyanghadaogym	Lumpinee Stadium	Bangkok, Thailand	Decision	5	3:00
Wins the Lumpinee Stadium Super Featherweight (130 lbs) title.
2011-05-10	Draw	(Thailand) Sam-A Kaiyanghadaogym	Lumpinee Stadium	Bangkok, Thailand	Decision draw	5	3:00
2011-04-06	Win	(Thailand) Phetek Kiatyongyut		Songkhla, Thailand	Decision	5	3:00
2011-03-15	Win	(Thailand) Pakorn PKSaenchaimuaythaigym	Lumpinee Stadium	Bangkok, Thailand	Decision	5	3:00
2011-02-21	Win	(Thailand) Singtongnoi Por.Telakun	Rajadamnern Stadium	Bangkok, Thailand	Decision	5	3:00
2010-12-07	Win	(Thailand) Pornsanae Sitmonchai	Lumpinee Stadium	Bangkok, Thailand	Decision	5	3:00
Wins the vacant Lumpinee Stadium Featherweight (126 lbs) title.
2010-11-02	Win	(Thailand) Pettawee Sor Kittichai	Lumpinee Stadium	Bangkok, Thailand	TKO(Referee Stoppage/elbows)	3	3:00
2010-10-05	Win	(Thailand) Detnarong Wor Sangprapai	Lumpinee Stadium	Bangkok, Thailand	Decision	5	3:00
2010-08-24	Win	(Thailand) Traijak Sitjomtrai	Lumpinee Stadium	Bangkok, Thailand	Decision	5	3:00
Wins the Thailand Featherweight (126 lbs) title.
2010-07-23	Win	(Thailand) Palangtip Nor Sripuang	Lumpinee Stadium	Bangkok, Thailand	Decision	5	3:00
2010-05-	Win	(Thailand) Senkeng Jor Nopparat	Omnoi Stadium	Bangkok, Thailand	Decision	5	3:00
2010-02-09	Win	(Thailand) Lekkla Thanasuranakorn	Lumpinee Stadium	Bangkok, Thailand	Decision	5	3:00
2009-12-29	Loss	(Thailand) Rungpet Wor.Sungprapai	Lumpinee Stadium	Bangkok, Thailand	Decision	5	3:00
2009-07-24	Loss	(Thailand) Werayut Lukpetnoi	Lumpinee Stadium	Bangkok, Thailand	Decision	5	3:00
2009-05-23	Win	(Thailand) Kaimukkao Sit.Or	Omnoi stadium	Samut Sakhon, Thailand	KO (Elbow)	4	
2009-04-10	Win	(Thailand) Kaichon Siamgsawangnapa	Lumpinee Stadium	Bangkok, Thailand	KO	4	
2008-09-19	Loss	(Thailand) Saeksan Or. Kwanmuang	Lumpinee Stadium	Bangkok, Thailand	Decision	5	3:00
2008-07-29	Win	(Thailand) Detkamon Himalaigym	Lumpinee Stadium	Bangkok, Thailand	TKO	4	
2007-06-22	Win	(Thailand) Wanchailek Kiatphukam	Lumpinee Stadium	Bangkok, Thailand	Decision	5	3:00
2007-05-01	Win	(Thailand) Pipatpong Jor.Nopparat	Lumpinee Stadium	Bangkok, Thailand	Decision	5	3:00
2007-04-06	Win	(Thailand) Krittongkam Tor Surachet	Lumpinee Stadium	Bangkok, Thailand	Decision	5	3:00
Legend: Win Loss Draw/No contest Notes
