= Ognjen Topić =

Bosnian-born Serbian-American Muay Thai kickboxer

- Born: February 1, 1986 (age 40); Jajce, Bosnia and Herzegovina, SFR Yugoslavia
- Native name: Ognjen Topić
- Nationality: (Serbia) Serbian
- Height: 173 cm (5 ft 8 in)
- Weight: 61 kg (134 lb; 10 st)
- Division: Lightweight
- Style: Muay Thai
- Fighting out of: Bangkok, Thailand
- Team: P.K. Saenchai Muaythai Gym

Kickboxing record
- Total: 72
- Wins: 39
- Losses: 30
- Draws: 3

Other information
- Website: https://www.topicfight.com/

Ognjen Topić (Serbian: Oгњен Топић; born February 1, 1986) is a Bosnian-born Serbian American Muay Thai kickboxer. He holds several Muay Thai world titles and has fought some of the sport's top competitors.

Ognjen Topić is a three-time world champion in Muay Thai. Topic is also a former Lion Fight World Champion, having earned the title in 2013. He was named "Professional Rookie of the Year" at the Muay Thai Authority Awards in 2011. He is also a World Boxing Council (WBC) North American Super Featherweight Champion and World Kickboxing Association (WKA) North American Lightweight Champion.

== Background ==
Topić was born into an ethnic Serb family in Bosnia and Herzegovina. His family fled the Bosnian War, first finding refuge in Serbia. Ognjen's father traveled to America to support the family financially. Later he won a U.S. green card through the immigration lottery. The family immigrated to the United States when Ognjen was nine years old.

When Topić hit the sixth grade, he and his father started to watch a lot of boxing on TV. This saw him yearn to be a pro boxer. But, with his parents coming over from Serbia, they did not want him to be a boxer. Topić wanted to fight any way he could, so he settled for Taekwondo.

In four years, Topić received his black belt in Taekwondo.

At 18, Topić first saw Muay Thai on ESPN. He saw the style of fight and fell in love. He found a Thai boxing gym not far from where he lived and started training at North Jersey Muay Thai in Lodi, New Jersey.

Also a professional graphic designer, Topić graduated from William Paterson University with a bachelor's degree in Fine Art.

== Muay Thai career ==
=== Overview ===
Topić is a resident of Pompton Lakes, New Jersey and has been training at a North Jersey Muay Thai in Lodi, New Jersey since 2005. A few years later, he trained at the Eminent Air Gym in Bangkok, Thailand, one of the top Muay Thai gyms in the country. Most recently, he has also trained at the P.K. Saenchai Muaythai Gym.

A professional Muay Thai athlete with over 50 professional fights, Topić has fought a number of competitors from Thailand. He has been in the ring with Saenchai (Lumpinee stadium Champion), Paowarit Sasiprapa (Lumpinee Boxing Stadium Champion), Dechsakdaa Sitsongpeenong (Ch 7 Champion), Rungravee Sasiprapa (Lumpinee Stadium Champion), Dechsakda Sitsongpeenong (Ch 7 Champion) and Nontakit Tor. Mor. Sri.

=== 2004–2007 ===
Topić began his Muay Thai training when he was 18 years old at North Jersey Muay Thai in Lodi, New Jersey. He had his first fight after two years of training at age 20.

In 2007, Topić made his debut on "Friday Night Fights" in the basement of a church in New York City.

=== 2013 ===
Topić quit his full-time job in graphic design in order to focus on his fighting career.

On March 15, 2013, Ognjen Topić made his Lion Fight debut at Lion Fight 9, facing former Lumpinee Stadium champion Paowarit Sasiprapa. He won the fight in upset fashion by head kick KO at 7 seconds of the third round.

=== 2014–2017 ===
Topić was a super featherweight kickboxer. He held titles in Muay Thai Grand Prix, Lion Fight, WBC and WKA competitions.

On September 26, 2015, he defeated Stephen Meleady at Lion Fight 24 to win the Lion Fight Lightweight World Championship.

On February 27, 2016, Topić lost the Lion Fight Lightweight World Title to Sergio Wielzen via TKO at Lion Fight 28.

In 2017, Topić fought Tum Sityodtong in the main event for Triumph Kombat 3 at Madison Square Garden. On July 8, 2017, he defeated Paul Barber in the United Kingdom to become the Muay Thai Grand Prix Lightweight Champion.

=== 2018 ===
On March 2, 2018, Topić defeated Travis Clay by unanimous decision to win the Friday Night Fights Lightweight Championship.

Later on, he signed with ONE Championship to compete in the all-striking ONE Super Series. Topić made his promotional debut on May 12, 2018, at ONE Championship: Grit and Glory, defeating Stergos Mikkios by unanimous decision.

However, Ognjen Topić would go 0–3 in his next three fights in ONE Championship. He faced Tukkatatong Petpayathai at ONE Championship: Beyond The Horizon. However, Topic was outmatched by the former Lumpinee Stadium and Rajadamnern Stadium champion, losing by unanimous decision.

=== 2019 ===
Looking to bounce back, Ognjen Topić next faced Saemapetch Fairtex at ONE Championship: Roots of Honor on April 12, 2019. He was outpointed in the first two rounds but when Saemapetch slowed down in the third round, Topic was able to land some significant elbows. However, it proved too late as Topić still lost by majority decision.

Riding on the momentum of a decision victory over Petchtongkam Bangkok-Alaigym at Lumpinee Stadium, Ognjen Topić faced Alaverdi Ramazanov at ONE Championship: Dreams of Gold on August 16, 2019. However, being outsized, Topić found himself being floored 3 times en route to a first-round TKO loss.

Topić is currently focused on fighting internationally, teaching seminars and being a personal trainer. His home base is now in Bangkok, Thailand at the famed P.K Saenchai Muay Thai Gym.

== Championships and awards ==
- Siam Omnoi Stadium
  - 2022 Omnoi Stadium Lightweight Champion
- Friday Night Fights
  - Friday Night Fights Lightweight World Champion
  - Most "Fight of the Night" honors in Friday Night Fights history
- World Kickboxing Association
  - WKA North American Lightweight Champion
  - 2011 WKA Professional Fighter of the Month
- International Kickboxing Federation
  - IKF World Lightweight Champion
- WBC Muaythai
  - WBC Muaythai North American Super Featherweight Champion
- Muay Thai Grand Prix
  - Muay Thai Grand Prix Lightweight World Champion
- Lion Fight
  - Lion Fight Lightweight World Champion
- Muay Thai Authority
  - 2011 North American Professional Rookie of the Year
- Muay Thai is Life
  - 2011 Break through Fighter of the Year
- New Jersey Martial Arts Hall of Fame
  - 2012 Fighter of the Year

== Muay Thai record ==
Muay Thai record
39 Wins, 31 Losses, 3 Draws
Date	Result	Opponent	Event	Location	Method	Round	Time
2025-01-25		(Australia) James Kostic	Rajadamnern World Series	Bangkok, Thailand			
2023-09-16	Loss	(Thailand) Yodkaikaew Fairtex	LWC Super Champ, Lumpinee Stadium	Bangkok, Thailand	Decision	5	3:00
2023-08-23	Loss	(Thailand) Petchmorakot ChonburiArtMuaythai	Muay Thai Palangmai, Rajadamnern Stadium	Bangkok, Thailand	Decision	5	3:00
2023-02-15	Loss	(Thailand) Dentungthong Singhamawynn	Muay Thai Palangmai, Rajadamnern Stadium	Bangkok, Thailand	Decision	5	3:00
2022-12-07	Loss	(Thailand) Petchsirichai Detpetchseethong	Muay Thai Palangmai, Rajadamnern Stadium	Bangkok, Thailand	Decision	5	3:00
2022-09-21	Loss	(United States) Jalill Barnes	Muay Thai Palangmai, Rajadamnern Stadium	Bangkok, Thailand	Decision	5	3:00
2022-08-27	Loss	(Thailand) Paruhatnoi TBM Gym	SuekJaoMuayThai, Omnoi Stadium	Samut Sakhon, Thailand	Decision	5	3:00
Loses the Omnoi Stadium 135 lbs title.
2022-07-02	Win	(Thailand) Yodduangjai Sor.Jor.Montree	SuekJaoMuayThai, Omnoi Stadium	Samut Sakhon, Thailand	Decision	5	3:00
Wins the Omnoi Stadium 135 lbs title.
2021-12-25	Draw	(Thailand) Yodduangjai Sor.Jor.Montree	SuekJaoMuayThai, Omnoi Stadium	Samut Sakhon, Thailand	Decision	5	3:00
For the Omnoi Stadium 135 lbs title.
2021-12-25	Win	(Thailand) Chalawan JomhodMuayThai	SuekJaoMuayThai, Omnoi Stadium	Samut Sakhon, Thailand	Decision	5	3:00
2021-10-30	Loss	(Thailand) Songfangkong FA Group	SuekJaoMuayThai, Omnoi Stadium	Samut Sakhon, Thailand	Decision	5	3:00
2021-04-03	Win	(Thailand) Fahlikit Sor Parath	TorNamThai Lumpinee TKO Kiatpetch, Lumpinee Stadium	Bangkok, Thailand	TKO	4	
2020-02-11	Win	(Thailand) Yodkhunpon Mor.RajabhatMubanChomBueng	P.K.Saenchai + Sor.Jor.Tongprachin, Lumpinee Stadium	Bangkok, Thailand	Decision	5	3:00
2019-12-10	Win	(Thailand) Sang-anda Rachanon	Lumpinee Stadium	Bangkok, Thailand	TKO	5	
2019-08-16	Loss	(Russia) Alaverdi Ramazanov	ONE Championship: Dreams of Gold	Bangkok, Thailand	TKO (Punch)	1	
2019-05-10	Win	(Thailand) Petchtongkam Bangkok-Alaigym	Lumpinee Stadium	Bangkok, Thailand	Decision	5	3:00
2019-04-12	Loss	(Thailand) Saemapetch Fairtex	ONE Championship: Roots of Honor	Pasay, Philippines	Decision (Majority)	3	3:00
2018-12-11	Win	(Brazil) David Singpatong	Lumpinee Stadium	Bangkok, Thailand	Decision	5	3:00
2018-09-08	Loss	(Thailand) Tukkatatong Petpayathai	ONE Championship: Beyond The Horizon	Shanghai, China	Decision	3	3:00
2018-05-12	Win	(Greece) Stergos Mikkios	ONE Championship: Grit and Glory	Jakarta, Indonesia	Decision (Unanimous)	3	3:00
2018-03-02	Win	(United States) Travis Clay	Friday Night Fights	United States	Decision (Unanimous)	5	3:00
Defends Friday Night Fights Lightweight title.
2017-07-08	Win	(United Kingdom) Paul Barber	Capital 1	Dublin, Ireland	Decision	5	3:00
Wins Muay Thai Grand Prix World 61.5kg title.
2017-06-09	Loss	(Thailand) Tum Sityodtong	Triumph Kombat 3	New York, United States	Decision	5	3:00
For the Triumph World 140 lbs Title.
2016-10-28	Loss	(Thailand) Saenchai	Yokkao 22	Hong Kong	Decision	3	3:00
2016-05-27	Win	(Thailand) Dechsakda Sitsongpeenong	Lion Fight 29	Connecticut, United States	Decision	5	3:00
2016-02-27	Loss	(Suriname) Sergio Wielzen	Lion Fight 28	Connecticut, United States	TKO (doctor stoppage)	3	0:50
Loses Lion Fight Lightweight World title
2016-01-17	Loss	(Thailand) Banpetch K-Sulian Pattaya	Max Muay Thai	Thailand	Decision	3	3:00
2015-12-13	Loss	(Thailand) Kanthep MTM Academy	Max Muay Thai	Thailand	Decision	3	3:00
For the Max Muay Thai World Title.
2015-09-26	Win	(Republic of Ireland) Stephen Meleady	Lion Fight 24	United States	Decision	5	3:00
Wins Lion Fight Lightweight World title
2014-11-21	Win	(Thailand) Rungravee Sasiprapa	Lion Fight 19	Connecticut, United States	Decision	5	3:00
2013-07-26	Win	(United States) Coke Chunhawat	Lion Fight 10	Las Vegas, United States	Decision (Split)	5	3:00
2013-03-15	Win	(Thailand) Paowarit Sasiprapa	Lion Fight 9	Las Vegas, United States	KO (High Kick)	3	0:07
2012-08-18	Loss	(Thailand) Neungsiam Samphusri	Push Kick	United States	Decision (Split)	5	3:00
2012-06-02	Win	(United States) Rami Ibrahim	Warriors Cup	United States	KO	3	
2011-07-23	Win	(United States) Tony Manoharan		United States	Decision	3	3:00
2011-05-14	Loss	(United States) Anthony Castrejon	Battle in the Desert 2	United States	Decision	5	3:00
2008-10-24	Win	(United States) Abe Estacio	Friday Night Fights	New York City, United States	Decision (Unanimous)	5	3:00
2008-09-26	Loss	(Thailand) Kittisak Noiwibon	Friday Night Fights	New York City, United States	Decision	5	3:00
2008-05-02	Draw	(United States) Omar Ahmed	Friday Night Fights	United States	Decision	3	3:00
Legend: Win Loss Draw/No contest Notes
