= 2019 in ONE Championship =

Mixed martial arts events

Information
- First date: January 19, 2019
- Last date: December 16, 2019

The year 2019 was the 9th year in the history of the ONE Championship, a mixed martial arts, kickboxing and muay thai promotion based in Singapore.

== Background ==
Chatri Sityodtong announced that ONE Championship will do 45 events in 2019: 24 ONE Championship events, 12 ONE Hero Series events, 6 ONE Warrior Series events and 3 ONE Esports events.

Sityodtong also announced that they would organise multiple Grand Prix in 2019. He announced a flyweight and a lightweight Grand Prix tournaments in mixed martial arts and a featherweight kickboxing Grand Prix with 8 fighters.

== List of events ==
=== ONE Championship ===
ONE Championship
No.	Event	Date	Venue	Location
1	ONE Championship: Eternal Glory	January 19, 2019	Istora Senayan	Jakarta, Indonesia
2	ONE Championship: Hero's Ascent	January 25, 2019	Mall of Asia Arena	Pasay, Philippines
3	ONE Championship: Clash of Legends	February 16, 2019	IMPACT Arena	Bangkok, Thailand
4	ONE Championship: Call to Greatness	February 22, 2019	Singapore Indoor Stadium	Kallang, Singapore
5	ONE Championship: Reign of Valor	March 8, 2019	Thuwunna Indoor Stadium	Yangon, Myanmar
6	ONE Championship: A New Era	March 31, 2019	Ryōgoku Kokugikan	Tokyo, Japan
7	ONE Championship: Roots Of Honor	April 12, 2019	Mall of Asia Arena	Pasay, Philippines
8	ONE Championship: For Honor	May 3, 2019	Istora Senayan	Jakarta, Indonesia
9	ONE Championship: Warriors Of Light	May 10, 2019	IMPACT Arena	Bangkok, Thailand
10	ONE Championship: Enter the Dragon	May 17, 2019	Singapore Indoor Stadium	Kallang, Singapore
11	ONE Championship: Legendary Quest	June 15, 2019	Baoshan Arena	Shanghai, China
12	ONE Championship: Masters Of Destiny	July 12, 2019	Axiata Arena	Kuala Lumpur, Malaysia
–	ONE Championship: Warriors Return (Cancelled)	July 20, 2019	Tianhe Gymnasium	Guangzhou, China
13	ONE Championship: Dawn Of Heroes	August 2, 2019	Mall of Asia Arena	Pasay, Philippines
14	ONE Championship: Dreams Of Gold	August 16, 2019	IMPACT Arena	Bangkok, Thailand
15	ONE Championship: Immortal Triumph	September 6, 2019	Phú Thọ Indoor Stadium	Ho Chi Minh City, Vietnam
16	ONE Championship: Century	October 13, 2019	Ryōgoku Kokugikan	Tokyo, Japan
17	ONE Championship: Dawn Of Valor	October 25, 2019	Istora Senayan	Jakarta, Indonesia
18	ONE Championship: Masters Of Fate	November 8, 2019	Mall of Asia Arena	Pasay, Philippines
19	ONE Championship: Age Of Dragons	November 16, 2019	Cadillac Arena	Beijing, China
20	ONE Championship: Edge Of Greatness	November 22, 2019	Singapore Indoor Stadium	Kallang, Singapore
21	ONE Championship: Mark Of Greatness	December 6, 2019	Axiata Arena	Kuala Lumpur, Malaysia

=== ONE Hero Series ===
ONE Hero Series
No.	Event	Date	Venue	Location
1	ONE Hero Series January	January 28, 2019	TBA	Beijing, China
2	ONE Hero Series February	February 25, 2019	TBA	Beijing, China
3	ONE Hero Series March	March 25, 2019	TBA	Beijing, China
4	ONE Hero Series April	April 22, 2019	TBA	Beijing, China
5	ONE Hero Series May	May 27, 2019	TBA	Beijing, China
6	ONE Hero Series June	June 14, 2019	TBA	Shanghai, China
7	ONE Hero Series July	July 22, 2019	TBA	Beijing, China
8	ONE Hero Series August	August 26, 2019	TBA	Beijing, China
9	ONE Hero Series September	September 23, 2019	TBA	Beijing, China
10	ONE Hero Series October	October 28, 2019	TBA	Beijing, China
11	ONE Hero Series November	November 18, 2019	TBA	Beijing, China
12	ONE Hero Series December	December 16, 2019	TBA	Beijing, China

=== ONE Warrior Series ===
ONE Warriors Series
No.	Event	Date	Venue	Location
1	ONE Warrior Series 4	February 28, 2019	TBA	Kallang, Singapore
2	ONE Warrior Series 5	April 25, 2019	TBA	Kallang, Singapore
3	ONE Warrior Series 6	June 20, 2019	TBA	Kallang, Singapore
4	ONE Warrior Series 7	August 22, 2019	TBA	Kallang, Singapore
5	ONE Warrior Series 8	October 17, 2019	Bellesalle Shibuya Garden	Tokyo, Japan
6	ONE Warrior Series 9	December 12, 2019	TBA	Kallang, Singapore

== Title fights ==
Mixed Martial Arts
#	Weight Class				Method	Round	Time	Event	Notes
1	Strawweight 57 kg	(Japan) Yosuke Saruta	def.	(Philippines) Joshua Pacio (c)	Decision (Split)	5	5:00	ONE: Eternal Glory	For the ONE Strawweight World Championship
2	Flyweight 61 kg	(Brazil) Adriano Moraes	def.	(Philippines) Geje Eustaquio (c)	Decision (Unanimous)	5	5:00	ONE: Hero's Ascent	For the ONE Flyweight World Championship
3	Welterweight 84 kg	(Sweden) Zebaztian Kadestam (c)	def.	(Kazakhstan) Georgiy Kichigin	TKO (Retirement)	2	5:00	ONE: Reign of Valor	For the ONE Welterweight World Championship
4	Bantamweight 66 kg	(Brazil) Bibiano Fernandes	def.	(Philippines) Kevin Belingon (c)	DQ (Illegal Elbows)	3	1:21	ONE: A New Era	For the ONE Bantamweight World Championship
5	Middleweight 93 kg	(Myanmar) Aung La Nsang (c)	def.	(Japan) Ken Hasegawa	TKO (Punches)	2	4:41	ONE: A New Era	For the ONE Middleweight World Championship
6	W.Strawweight 57 kg	(China) Xiong Jingnan (c)	def.	(United States) Angela Lee	TKO (Punches and Kicks to the Body)	5	1:37	ONE: A New Era	For the ONE Women's Strawweight World Championship
7	Lightweight 77 kg	(Japan) Shinya Aoki	def.	(Philippines) Eduard Folayang (c)	Submission (Arm-Triangle Choke)	1	2:34	ONE: A New Era	For the ONE Lightweight World Championship
8	Strawweight 57 kg	(Philippines) Joshua Pacio	def.	(Japan) Yosuke Saruta (c)	KO (Head Kick)	4	2:43	ONE: Roots of Honor	For the ONE Strawweight World Championship
9	Featherweight 70 kg	(Australia) Martin Nguyen (c)	def.	(Mongolia) Jadamba Narantungalag	KO (Flying Knee)	2	1:07	ONE: Roots of Honor	For the ONE Featherweight World Championship
10	Lightweight 77 kg	(United States) Christian Lee	def.	(Japan) Shinya Aoki (c)	TKO (Punches)	2	0:51	ONE: Enter the Dragon	For the ONE Lightweight World Championship
10	Featherweight 70 kg	(Australia) Martin Nguyen (c)	def.	(Japan) Koyomi Matsushima	TKO (Punches)	2	4:40	ONE: Dawn Of Heroes	For the ONE Featherweight World Championship
11	W. Atomweight 52 kg	(United States) Angela Lee (c)	def.	(China) Xiong Jingnan	Submission (Rear-Naked Choke)	5	4:48	ONE: Century	For the ONE Women's Atomweight World Championship

Muay Thai
#	Weight Class				Method	Round	Time	Event	Notes
1	Bantamweight 66 kg	(Thailand) Nong-O Gaiyanghadao	def.	(China) Han Zihao	Decision (Unanimous)	5	3:00	ONE: Clash of Legends	For the inaugural ONE Bantamweight Muay Thai World Championship
2	W. Atomweight 52 kg	(Thailand) Stamp Fairtex	def.	(United States) Janet Todd	Decision (Unanimous)	5	3:00	ONE: Call to Greatness	For the inaugural ONE Women's Atomweight Muay Thai World Championship
3	Flyweight 61 kg	(England) Jonathan Haggerty	def.	(Thailand) Sam-A Gaiyanghadao (c)	Decision (Unanimous)	5	3:00	ONE: For Honor	For the ONE Flyweight Muay Thai World Championship
4	Bantamweight 66 kg	(Thailand) Nong-O Gaiyanghadao (c)	def.	(Japan) Hiroaki Suzuki	Decision (Unanimous)	5	3:00	ONE: Warriors Of Light	For the ONE Bantamweight Muay Thai World Championship
5	Atomweight 52 kg	(Thailand) Stamp Fairtex (c)	def.	(Australia) Alma Juniku	Decision (Unanimous)	5	5:00	ONE: Legendary Quest	For the inaugural ONE Women's Atomweight Muay Thai World Championship
6	Flyweight 61 kg	(Thailand) Rodtang Jitmuangnon	def.	(England) Jonathan Haggerty (c)	Decision (Unanimous)	5	3:00	ONE: Dawn Of Heroes	For the ONE Flyweight Muay Thai World Championship
7	Bantamweight 66 kg	(Thailand) Nong-O Gaiyanghadao (c)	def.	(France) Brice Deval	Decision (Unanimous)	5	3:00	ONE: Immortal Triumph	For the ONE Bantamweight Muay Thai World Championship

Kickboxing
#	Weight Class				Method	Round	Time	Event	Notes
1	Flyweight 61 kg	(Thailand) Petchdam Petchyindee Academy	def.	(Algeria) Elias Mahmoudi	Technical Decision (Unanimous)	5	0:29	ONE: Warriors Of Light	For the inaugural ONE Flyweight Kickboxing World Championship
2	Lightweight 77 kg	(Suriname) Regian Eersel	def.	(Netherlands) Nieky Holzken	Decision (Unanimous)	5	3:00	ONE: Enter the Dragon	For the inaugural ONE Flyweight Kickboxing World Championship
3	Flyweight 61 kg	(Netherlands) Ilias Ennahachi	def.	(Thailand) Petchdam Petchyindee Academy (c)	KO (Punches)	3	0:59	ONE: Dreams of Gold	For the inaugural ONE Flyweight Kickboxing World Championship

== Grand Prix Participant ==
=== 8-Man MMA Lightweight 77 kg GP Participant ===
- (Philippines) Honorio Banario
- (United States) Lowen Tynanes
- (United States) Eddie Alvarez
- (Russia) Timofey Nastyukhin
- (Singapore) Amir Khan
- (Canada) Ariel Sexton
- (Turkey) Saygid Guseyn Arslanaliev
- (Malaysia) Ev Ting

=== 8-Man MMA Flyweight 61 kg GP Participant ===
- (United States) Demetrious Johnson
- (Kazakhstan) Kairat Akhmetov
- (Cuba) Gustavo Balart
- (Japan) Yuya Wakamatsu
- (Philippines) Danny Kingad
- (Japan) Tatsumitsu Wada
- (Australia) Reece McLaren
- (Japan) Senzo Ikeda

=== 8-Man Kickboxing Featherweight 70 kg GP Participant ===
- (Russia) Dzhabar Askerov
- (Thailand) Yodsanklai Fairtex
- (Ukraine) Sasha Moisa
- (Italy) Giorgio Petrosyan
- (Thailand) Jo Nattawut
- (Germany) Enriko Kehl
- (France) Samy Sana
- (Thailand) Phetmorakot Petchyindee Academy

== Grand Prix bracket ==
=== ONE Lightweight Grand Prix bracket ===
Quarter-finals
(Philippines) Honorio Banario	1R.
(United States) Lowen Tynanes	TKO
(United States) Eddie Alvarez	1R.
(Russia) Timofey Nastyukhin	TKO
(Singapore) Amir Khan	3R.
(Canada) Ariel Sexton	SUB
(Malaysia) Ev Ting	1R.
(Turkey) Saygid Guseyn Arslanaliev	TKO

Semi-finals
(United States) Eddie Alvarez	SUB
(Philippines) Eduard Folayang	1R.
(Singapore) Amir Khan	1R.
(Turkey) Saygid Guseyn Arslanaliev	KO

Final
(United States) Christian Lee	UD
(Turkey) Saygid Guseyn Arslanaliev	3R.

- Amir Khan replaced injured Ariel Sexton at the semi-finals.
- Eddie Alvarez replaced injured Lowen Tynanes at the semi-finals.
- Eduard Folayang replaced injured Timofey Nastyukhin at the semi-finals.
- Christian Lee replaced injured Eddie Alvarez in the final.

=== ONE Flyweight Grand Prix bracket ===
Quarter-finals
(United States) Demetrious Johnson	SUB
(Japan) Yuya Wakamatsu	2R.
(Japan) Tatsumitsu Wada	UD
(Cuba) Gustavo Balart	3R.
(Kazakhstan) Kairat Akhmetov	UD
(Australia) Reece McLaren	3R.
(Philippines) Danny Kingad	UD
(Japan) Senzo Ikeda	3R.

Semi-finals
(United States) Demetrious Johnson	UD
(Japan) Tatsumitsu Wada	3R.
(Australia) Reece McLaren	3R.
(Philippines) Danny Kingad	SD

Final
(United States) Demetrious Johnson	UD
(Philippines) Danny Kingad	3R.

- Reece McLaren replaced injured Kairat Akhmetov at the semi-finals

=== ONE Kickboxing Featherweight Grand Prix bracket ===
Quarter-finals
(Italy) Giorgio Petrosyan	UD
(Thailand) Phetmorakot Petchyindee Academy	3R.
(Ukraine) Sasha Moisa	3R.
(Thailand) Jo Nattawut	TKO
(France) Samy Sana	UD
(Thailand) Yodsanklai Fairtex	3R.
(Russia) Dzhabar Askerov	UD
(Germany) Enriko Kehl	3R.

Semi-finals
(Italy) Giorgio Petrosyan	KO
(Thailand) Jo Nattawut	1R.
(France) Samy Sana	MD
(Russia) Dzhabar Askerov	3R.

Final
(Italy) Giorgio Petrosyan	UD
(France) Samy Sana	3R.

- Sasha Moisa replaced Andy Souwer at the quarter-finals.

== ONE Championship: Eternal Glory ==
ONE Championship: Eternal Glory
- Promotion: ONE Championship
- Date: January 19, 2019
- Venue: Istora Senayan
- City: Jakarta, Indonesia

ONE Championship: Eternal Glory (also known as ONE Championship 85) was a combat sport event held by ONE Championship on January 19, 2019, at the Istora Senayan in Jakarta, Indonesia.

=== Background ===
This event featured title fight for the ONE Strawweight Championship between the champion Joshua Pacio and the top contender Yosuke Saruta as ONE: Eternal Glory headliner.

Hayato Suzuki was to challenge Joshua Pacio for the strawweight title at this event, but had to withdraw due to an injury. He was replaced by Yosuke Saruta.

Kharun Atlangeriev was scheduled to face Koji Ando, but Atlangeriev was forced off the card on January 3 with an injury. Rasul Yakhyaev served as Atlangeriev's replacement.

=== Results ===
ONE: Eternal Glory
Weight Class				Method	Round	Time	Notes
Strawweight 57 kg	(Japan) Yosuke Saruta	def.	(Philippines) Joshua Pacio (c)	Decision (Split)	5	5:00	For the ONE Strawweight World Championship
Flyweight 61 kg	(Thailand) Mongkolpetch Petchyindee	def.	(New Zealand) Alexi Serepisos	Decision (Unanimous)	3	3:00	Muay Thai
Featherweight 70 kg	(United States) Christian Lee	def.	(Philippines) Edward Kelly	TKO (Punches)	1	2:53	
Atomweight 52 kg	(India) Puja Tomar	def.	(Indonesia) Priscilla Gaol	Decision (Split)	3	5:00	
Flyweight 61 kg	(England) Jonathan Haggerty	def.	(Italy) Joseph Lasiri	Decision (Unanimous)	3	3:00	Muay Thai
Strawweight 57 kg	(Philippines) Robin Catalan	def.	(Indonesia) Stefer Rahardian	Decision (Unanimous)	3	5:00	
Featherweight 70 kg	(Brazil) Bruno Pucci	def.	(South Korea) Kotetsu Boku	Submission (Rear-Naked Choke)	1	3:32	
Preliminary Card
Featherweight 70 kg	(South Korea) Kwon Won Il	def.	(Netherlands) Anthony Engelen	TKO (Punches)	1	1:07	
Lightweight 77 kg	(Japan) Koji Ando	def.	(Russia) Rasul Yakhyaev	Decision (Split)	3	5:00	
Catchweight 68 kg	(China) Niu Kang Kang	def.	(Indonesia) Sunoto Peringkat	KO (Head Kick and Punch)	1	0:31	
Strawweight 57 kg	(Indonesia) Malik Abdul Aziz Calim Akbar	def.	(Indonesia) Adi Paryanto	Submission (Rear-Naked Choke)	1	4:40	
Featherweight 70 kg	(Indonesia) Oscar Yaqut	def.	(Indonesia) Andreas Satyawan	Submission (Punches)	2	2:36	

== ONE Championship: Hero's Ascent ==
ONE Championship: Hero's Ascent
- Promotion: ONE Championship
- Date: January 25, 2019
- Venue: Mall of Asia Arena
- City: Pasay, Philippines

ONE Championship: Hero's Ascent (also known as ONE Championship 86) was a combat sport event held by ONE Championship on January 25, 2019, at the Mall of Asia Arena in Pasay, Philippines.

=== Background ===
This event featured a trilogy fight between the champion Geje Eustaquio and the former champion Adriano Moraes for the ONE Flyweight Championship as ONE: Hero's Ascent headliner.

This card also featured the first bout in the ONE Championship Lightweight World Grand Prix Tournament between the American Lowen Tynanes and Honorio Banario.

=== Results ===
ONE: Hero's Ascent
Weight Class				Method	Round	Time	Notes
Flyweight 61 kg	(Brazil) Adriano Moraes	def.	(Philippines) Geje Eustaquio (c)	Decision (Unanimous)	5	5:00	For the ONE Flyweight World Championship
Lightweight 77 kg	(United States) Lowen Tynanes	def.	(Philippines) Honorio Banario	TKO (Punches)	1	4:46	Lightweight Grand-Prix Quarter-finals
Flyweight 61 kg	(Philippines) Danny Kingad	def.	(Japan) Tatsumitsu Wada	Decision (Unanimous)	3	5:00	
Flyweight 61 kg	(Thailand) Rodtang Jitmuangnon	def.	(Tunisia) Fahdi Khaled	Decision (Unanimous)	3	3:00	Muay Thai
Middleweight 93 kg	(Netherlands) Reinier de Ridder	def.	(China) Fan Rong	Submission (D'arce Choke)	1	1:51	
Flyweight 61 kg	(Japan) Hiroki Akimoto	def.	(Australia) Josh Tonna	Decision (Unanimous)	3	3:00	Kickboxing
Bantamweight 66 kg	(Thailand) Bangpleenoi Petchyindee Academy	def.	(Netherlands) Brown Pinas	Decision (Unanimous)	3	3:00	Muay Thai
Preliminary Card
Flyweight 61 kg	(Algeria) Elias Mahmoudi	def.	(Japan) Yukinori Ogasawara	Decision (Unanimous)	3	3:00	Muay Thai
Featherweight 70 kg	(China) Tang Kai	def.	(South Korea) Sung Jong Lee	KO (Head Kick)	2	1:14	
Bantamweight 66 kg	(Japan) Hiroaki Suzuki	def.	(Malaysia) Mohammad Bin Mahmoud	TKO (Punches)	3	2:53	Muay Thai
Strawweight 57 kg	(India) Himanshu Kaushik	def.	(Indonesia) Egi Rozten	TKO (Punches)	1	3:33	

== ONE Hero Series January ==
ONE Hero Series January
- Promotion: ONE Championship
- Date: January 28, 2019
- City: Beijing, China

ONE Hero Series January was a combat sport event held by ONE Championship on January 28, 2019, in Beijing, China.

=== Results ===
ONE Hero Series January
Weight Class				Method	Round	Time	Notes
Catchweight 67.2 kg	(China) Xie Wei	def.	(China) Ze Lang Zha Xi	TKO (Punches)	3	1:06	
Welterweight 84 kg	(China) Makeshate Sailike	def.	(China) Tao Yu Fei	KO (Punches)	1	1:43	
Catchweight 72 kg	(China) Sun Shu Wei	def.	(China) Ma Teng	Submission (Rear-Naked Choke)	1	2:58	
Catchweight 68 kg	(China) Lu Zhao Huang	def.	(China) Hu Li Zong	Submission (Rear-Naked Choke)	2	3:54	
Flyweight 61 kg	(China) Hu Yong	def.	(China) Yan Zhi Yuan	Decision (Unanimous)	3	5:00	
Lightweight 77 kg	(China) Ma Meng Hao	def.	(China) Chang Shuai	Submission (Triangle Choke)	1	3:36	
Catchweight 68.1 kg	(China) Chen Hao	def.	(China) Xu Hong Xi	Decision (Unanimous)	3	5:00	
Strawweight 57 kg	(China) Li Zhe	def.	(China) Yang Ying Qiang	Submission (Rear-Naked Choke)	1	1:46	
Catchweight 62.1 kg	(China) Wang Zhen	def.	(China) Zhang Yu Sen	TKO (Knee and Punches)	1	0:27	
Catchweight 58 kg	(China) Cai Xiong Xiong	def.	(China) Zhao Tian Cheng	TKO (Injury)	1	0:26	

== ONE Championship: Clash of Legends ==
ONE Championship: Clash of Legends
- Promotion: ONE Championship
- Date: February 16, 2019
- Venue: IMPACT Arena
- City: Bangkok, Thailand

ONE Championship: Clash of Legends (also known as ONE Championship 87) was a combat sport event held by ONE Championship on February 16, 2019, at the IMPACT Arena in Bangkok, Thailand.

=== Background ===
This event featured a title fight between Nong-O Gaiyanghadao and Han Zi Hao for the inaugural ONE Muay Thai Bantamweight Championship as ONE: Clash of Legends headliner.

=== Results ===
ONE: Clash of Legends
Weight Class				Method	Round	Time	Notes
Bantamweight 66 kg	(Thailand) Nong-O Gaiyanghadao	def.	(China) Han Zi Hao	Decision (Unanimous)	5	3:00	For the inaugural ONE Bantamweight Muay Thai World Championship
Bantamweight 66 kg	(Thailand) Kongsak P.K.Saenchaimuaythaigym	def.	(Russia) Alaverdi Ramazanov	Decision (Split)	3	3:00	Muay Thai
Bantamweight 66 kg	(Japan) Shuya Kamikubo	def.	(South Korea) Dae Hwan Kim	Decision (Unanimous)	3	5:00	
Bantamweight 66 kg	(New Zealand) Mark Abelardo	def.	(Japan) Daichi Takenaka	TKO (Doctor Stoppage)	3	2:34	
Lightweight 77 kg	(Mongolia) Amarsanaa Tsogookhuu	def.	(Thailand) Shannon Wiratchai	Decision (Unanimous)	3	5:00	
Featherweight 70 kg	(Thailand) Jo Nattawut	def.	(France) Samy Sana	Decision (Unanimous)	3	3:00	Muay Thai
Atomweight 52 kg	(Philippines) Gina Iniong	def.	(Malaysia) Jihin Radzuan	Decision (Split)	3	5:00	
Flyweight 61 kg	(Thailand) Superlek Kiatmuu 9	def.	(Cambodia) Lao Chetra	Decision (Unanimous)	3	3:00	Muay Thai
Preliminary Card
Catchweight 67.5 kg	(Thailand) Chamuaktong Fightermuaythai	def.	(England) Charlie Peters	Decision (Majority)	3	3:00	Muay Thai
Featherweight 70 kg	(Japan) Yoshiki Nakahara	def.	(United States) Emilio Urrutia	TKO (Punches)	3	2:50	
Atomweight 52 kg	(Cambodia) Nou Srey Pov	def.	(Thailand) Rika Ishige	Decision (Unanimous)	3	5:00	
Strawweight 57 kg	(China) Liu Peng Shuai	def.	(Indonesia) Elipitua Siregar	Submission (Kimura)	3	4:15	

== ONE Championship: Call to Greatness ==
ONE Championship: Call to Greatness
- Promotion: ONE Championship
- Date: February 22, 2019
- Venue: Singapore Indoor Stadium
- City: Kallang, Singapore

ONE Championship: Call to Greatness (also known as ONE Championship 88) was a combat sport event held by ONE Championship on February 22, 2019, at the Singapore Indoor Stadium in Kallang, Singapore.

=== Background ===
This event featured a title fight between the ONE Women's Atomweight Kickboxing World Championship Stamp Fairtex and American Muay Thai champion Janet Todd for the inaugural ONE Muay Thai Atomweight Championship as ONE: Call to Greatness headliner.

An Atomweight bout between Mei Yamaguchi and Meng Bo was previously scheduled for ONE: Call to Greatness. However, Meng Bo pulled out of the fight due to foot injury and the bout was scrapped.

Rahul Raju was scheduled to face Ahmed Mujtaba at ONE: Call to Greatness. However, Mujtaba pulled out of the fight due to visa issues. In turn, promotion officials rescheduled the pairing for ONE Championship: Reign of Valor event on March 9, 2019 in Yangon, Myanmar.

=== Results ===
ONE: Call to Greatness
Weight Class				Method	Round	Time	Notes
Atomweight 52 kg	(Thailand) Stamp Fairtex	def.	(United States) Janet Todd	Decision (Unanimous)	5	3:00	For the inaugural ONE Women's Atomweight Muay Thai World Championship
Lightweight 77 kg	(Canada) Ariel Sexton	def.	(Singapore) Amir Khan	Submission (Rear-Naked Choke)	3	1:13	Lightweight Grand-Prix Quarter-finals
Lightweight 77 kg	(Turkey) Saygid Guseyn Arslanaliev	def.	(Malaysia) Ev Ting	TKO (Punches)	1	0:25	Lightweight Grand-Prix Quarter-finals
Lightweight 77 kg	(Netherlands) Nieky Holzken	def.	(Morocco) Mustapha Haida	Decision (Unanimous)	3	3:00	Kickboxing
Strawweight 52 kg	(Thailand) Dejdamrong Sor Amnuaysirichoke	def.	(Philippines) Jeremy Miado	TKO (Knees)	2	2:38	
Flyweight 61 kg	(Thailand) Petchdam Petchyindee Academy	def.	(Japan) Masahide Kudo	KO (Punch)	2	0:35	Kickboxing
Bantamweight 66 kg	(China) Zhang Chenglong	def.	(Cambodia) Kong Sambo	Decision (Split)	3	3:00	Kickboxing
Preliminary Card
Lightweight 77 kg	(Netherlands) Regian Eersel	def.	(Nigeria) Anthony Njokuani	KO (Punches)	2	1:03	Kickboxing
Strawweight 57 kg	(Japan) Ayaka Miura	def.	(Argentina) Laura Balin	Submission (Scarf Hold Armlock)	1	1:13	
Bantamweight 66 kg	(Japan) Masakazu Imanari	def.	(South Korea) Kwon Won Il	Submission (Heel Hook)	1	0:53	
Flyweight 61 kg	(Indonesia) Rudy Agustian	def.	(Cambodia) Khon Sichan	Submission (Rear-Naked Choke)	1	3:14	

== ONE Hero Series February ==
ONE Hero Series February
- Promotion: ONE Championship
- Date: February 25, 2019
- City: Beijing, China

ONE Hero Series February was a combat sport event held by ONE Championship on February 25, 2019, in Beijing, China.

=== Results ===
ONE Hero Series February
Weight Class				Method	Round	Time	Notes
Bantamweight 66 kg	(China) Li Hao Jie	def.	(China) Yang Fu Chong	Decision (Unanimous)	3	5:00	
Catchweight 67.5 kg	(China) Pan Jia Yun	def.	(China) Zheng Bo	TKO (Retirement)	2	3:00	Kickboxing
Bantamweight 66 kg	(China) Ahejiang Ailinuer	def.	(China) Li Shuai Hu	TKO (Punches)	1	3:30	
Flyweight 61 kg	(China) Yang Hua	def.	(China) Liu Yao Hong	Decision (Unanimous)	3	3:00	Kickboxing
Featherweight 70 kg	(China) Fu Kang kang	def.	(China) Wang Tan Zhao	TKO (Punches)	1	1:51	
Strawweight 57 kg	(China) Li Zhe	def.	(China) Xie Long Long	Submission (Arm-Triangle Choke)	1	1:24	
Flyweight 61 kg	(China) Li Yuan Kun	def.	(China) Dai Xiong Li	KO (Body Punch)	3	0:23	Kickboxing
Strawweight 57 kg	(China) Li hong Lin	def.	(China) Cai Xiong Xiong	Submission (Rear-Naked Choke)	1	3:09	
Flyweight 61 kg	(China) Wang Mao Lun	def.	(China) Ta Si ken	TKO (Punches)	2	3:13	

== ONE Warrior Series 4 ==
ONE Warrior Series 4
- Promotion: ONE Championship
- Date: February 28, 2019
- City: Kallang, Singapore

ONE Warrior Series 4 was a combat sport event held by ONE Championship on February 28, 2019, in Kallang, Singapore.

=== Results ===
ONE Warriors Series 4
Weight Class				Method	Round	Time	Notes
Welterweight 84 kg	(United States) Devon Morris	def.	(Nigeria) Emmanuel Onyedikachi	KO (Punches)	2	2:39	
Lightweight 77 kg	(Japan) Kimihiro Eto	def.	(Philippines) Trestle Tan	Submission (Arm-Triangle Choke)	1	0:50	
Catchweight 54.8 kg	(Pakistan) Anita Karim	def.	(Indonesia) Gita Suharsono	Decision (Unanimous)	3	5:00	
Flyweight 61 kg	(Thailand) Detchadin Sorsirisuphathin	def.	(Malaysia) Mohd Fouzein	TKO (Punches)	1	2:46	
Bantamweight 66 kg	(Mongolia) Shinechagtga Zoltsetseg	def.	(Iran) Ali Motamed	TKO (Punches)	2	3:05	
Atomweight 52 kg	(Malaysia) Edilah Johany	def.	(Malaysia) Roshnee Khaira	TKO (Punches)	1	0:14	
Featherweight 70 kg	(Japan) Asuka Tsubaki	def.	(China) Luo Zhuojiangcuo	Decision (Unanimous)	3	5:00	
Bantamweight 66 kg	(United States) Zechariah Lange	def.	(United States) Michael Walker	Decision (Unanimous)	3	5:00	
Strawweight 57 kg	(Brunei) Adib Suleiman	def.	(Thailand) Rungrot Posiri	TKO (Punches)	3	1:14	
Atomweight 52 kg	(Brazil) Michele Ferreira	def.	(New Zealand) Nyrene Crowley	KO (Knee and Punches)	3	0:45	
Featherweight 70 kg	(Vietnam) Tran Quang Loc	def.	(South Korea) Jong Heon Kim	TKO (Doctor Stoppage)	1	1:17	
Catchweight 58.4 kg	(Philippines) Lito Adiwang	def.	(Brazil) Alberto Correia	TKO (Punches)	1	0:45	
Atomweight 52 kg	(South Korea) So Yul Kim	def.	(Japan) Yuko Suzuki	Decision (Unanimous)	3	5:00	
Flyweight 61 kg	(Thailand) Saharat Kongsawat	def.	(Pakistan) Faizan Khan	TKO (Injury)	1	4:02	

== ONE Championship: Reign of Valor ==
ONE Championship: Reign of Valor
- Promotion: ONE Championship
- Date: March 8, 2019
- Venue: Thuwunna Indoor Stadium
- City: Yangon, Myanmar

ONE Championship: Reign of Valor (also known as ONE Championship 89) was a combat sport event held by ONE Championship on March 8, 2019, at the Thuwunna Indoor Stadium in Yangon, Myanmar.

=== Background ===
This event features a title fight between the champion Zebaztian Kadestam and Georgiy Kichigin for ONE Welterweight World Championship as ONE: Reign of Valor headliner.

=== Results ===
ONE: Reign of Valor
Weight Class				Method	Round	Time	Notes
Welterweight 84 kg	(Sweden) Zebaztian Kadestam (c)	def.	(Kazakhstan) Georgiy Kichigin	TKO (Retirement)	2	5:00	For the ONE Welterweight World Championship
Featherweight 70 kg	(Myanmar) Phoe Thaw	def.	(Indonesia) Yohan Mulia Legowo	TKO (Punches)	1	4:56	
Heavyweight 120 kg	(Italy) Mauro Cerilli	def.	(Cameroon) Alain Ngalani	KO (Knees)	1	1:41	
Strawweight 57 kg	(Philippines) Rene Catalan	def.	(Japan) Yoshitaka Naito	TKO (Punches)	1	4:32	
Flyweight 61 kg	(Canada) Gurdarshan Mangat	def.	(Finland) Toni Tauru	TKO (Punches)	3	1:23	
Featherweight 70 kg	(Thailand) Phetmorakot Wor Sangprapai	def.	(Japan) Kenta Yamada	Decision (Unanimous)	3	3:00	Kickboxing
Catchweight 68 kg	(Myanmar) Tial Thang	def.	(Cambodia) Rin Saroth	Decision (Unanimous)	3	5:00	
Featherweight 70 kg	(Germany) Enriko Kehl	def.	(England) Liam Nolan	TKO (Punches)	2	2:12	Kickboxing
Preliminary Card
Middleweight 93 kg	(Netherlands) Tarik Khbabez	def.	(Romania) Andrei Stoica	Decision (Unanimous)	3	3:00	Kickboxing
Atomweight 52 kg	(China) Lin Heqin	def.	(Philippines) Jomary Torres	Submission (Triangle Choke)	1	4:12	
Catchweight 67 kg	(China) Chen Rui	def.	(Northern Mariana Islands) Roman Alvarez	TKO (Punches)	2	2:48	
Atomweight 52 kg	(Myanmar) Bozhena Antoniyar	def.	(Malaysia) Audreylaura Boniface	TKO (Punches)	2	1:31	
Flyweight 61 kg	(Portugal) Rui Botelho	def.	(Japan) Yuta Watanabe	Decision (Unanimous)	3	3:00	Kickboxing
Flyweight 61 kg	(Japan) Momotaro	def.	(China) Kenny Tse	Decision (Unanimous)	3	3:00	Kickboxing

== ONE Hero Series March ==
ONE Hero Series March
- Promotion: ONE Championship
- Date: March 25, 2019
- City: Beijing, China

ONE Hero Series March was a combat sport event held by ONE Championship on March 25, 2019, in Beijing, China.

=== Results ===
ONE Hero Series March
Weight Class				Method	Round	Time	Notes
Catchweight 68 kg	(China) Liu Meng Yu	def.	(China) Zhong Qing Ya	TKO (Retirement)	2	5:00	
Lightweight 77 kg	(China) Lu Zheng	def.	(China) Zhang Ze Hao	Decision (Unanimous)	3	5:00	
Catchweight 68 kg	(China) Yang Wu Lin	def.	(China) Hu Bin Qian	Decision (Unanimous)	3	3:00	Kickboxing
Bantamweight 66 kg	(China) Liu De Li Ge Ri Hu	def.	(China) Wang Shuai	KO (Punch)	1	1:26	
Flyweight 61 kg	(China) Hu Yong	def.	(China) Meng Ketuogesi	TKO (Punches)	1	1:06	
Lightweight 77 kg	(China) Ding Meng	def.	(China) Sun Shu Wei	TKO (Punches)	2	4:47	
Strawweight 57 kg	(China) Ni Gedan	def.	(China) Li Hong Lin	Submission (Rear-Naked Choke)	1	2:06	
Catchweight 68 kg	(China) Fu Qing Nan	def.	(China) Wang Zhen Dong	KO (Punches to the Body)	1	2:38	Kickboxing
Flyweight 61 kg	(China) Wang Zhen	def.	(China) Yan Zhi Yuan	Decision (Unanimous)	3	5:00	
Bantamweight 66 kg	(China) Hao Da Peng	def.	(China) Liu Jing Peng	TKO (Punches)	1	3:35	
Atomweight 52 kg	(China) Liu Jie	vs.	(China) Wang Lu Ping				

== ONE Championship: A New Era ==
ONE Championship: A New Era
- Promotion: ONE Championship
- Date: March 31, 2019
- Venue: Ryōgoku Kokugikan
- City: Tokyo, Japan

ONE Championship: A New Era (also known as ONE Championship 90) was a combat sport event held by ONE Championship on March 31, 2019, at the Ryōgoku Kokugikan in Tokyo, Japan.

=== Background ===
Andrew Leone was scheduled to face Danny Kingad in the ONE Flyweight World Grand Prix quarterfinal, but Leone was forced off the card on March 14 with an injury. Pancrase Flyweight champion Senzo Ikeda served as Leone replacement.

Ivanildo Delfino was set to fight with Tatsumitsu Wada in the first round of the ONE Flyweight World Grand Prix, but Delfino had to withdraw due to an injury. As a result of this, the bout will be rescheduled for a later date.

=== Results ===
ONE: A New Era
Weight Class				Method	Round	Time	Notes
Lightweight 77 kg	(Japan) Shinya Aoki	def.	(Philippines) Eduard Folayang (c)	Submission (Arm-Triangle Choke)	1	2:34	For the ONE Lightweight World Championship
Strawweight 57 kg	(China) Xiong Jingnan (c)	def.	(United States) Angela Lee	TKO (Punches and Kicks to the Body)	5	1:37	For the ONE Women's Strawweight World Championship
Middleweight 93 kg	(Myanmar) Aung La Nsang (c)	def.	(Japan) Ken Hasegawa	TKO (Punches)	2	4:41	For the ONE Middleweight World Championship
Bantamweight 66 kg	(Brazil) Bibiano Fernandes	def.	(Philippines) Kevin Belingon (c)	DQ (Illegal Elbows to Back of Head)	3	1:21	For the ONE Bantamweight World Championship
Flyweight 61 kg	(United States) Demetrious Johnson	def.	(Japan) Yuya Wakamatsu	Submission (Guillotine Choke)	2	2:40	Flyweight Grand-Prix Quarter-finals
Lightweight 77 kg	(Russia) Timofey Nastyukhin	def.	(United States) Eddie Alvarez	TKO (Punches)	1	4:05	Lightweight Grand-Prix Quarter-finals
Catachweight 72 kg	(Thailand) Yodsanklai Fairtex	def.	(Netherlands) Andy Souwer	TKO (Punches)	2	0:51	Kickboxing
Preliminary Card
Flyweight 61 kg	(Philippines) Danny Kingad	def.	(Japan) Senzo Ikeda	Decision (Unanimous)	3	5:00	Flyweight Grand-Prix Quarter-finals
Flyweight 61 kg	(Kazakhstan) Kairat Akhmetov	def.	(Australia) Reece McLaren	Decision (Unanimous)	3	5:00	Flyweight Grand-Prix Quarter-finals
Flyweight 61 kg	(Thailand) Rodtang Jitmuangnon	def.	(Algeria) Hakim Hamech	Decision (Split)	3	3:00	Muay Thai
Flyweight 61 kg	(Italy) Joseph Lasiri	def.	(Japan) Hiroki Akimoto	Decision (Majority)	3	3:00	Kickboxing
Atomweight 52 kg	(Japan) Mei Yamaguchi	def.	(Russia) Kseniya Lachkova	Submission (Armbar)	3	3:18	
Featherweight 70 kg	(United States) Garry Tonon	def.	(Netherlands) Anthony Engelen	TKO (Punches)	1	4:12	
Bantamweight 66 kg	(Cyprus) Panicos Yusuf	def.	(Malaysia) Mohammed Bin Mahmoud	Decision (Unanimous)	3	3:00	Muay Thai
Lightweight 77 kg	(South Korea) Yoon Chang Min	def.	(India) Bala Shetty	Submission (Rear-Naked Choke)	1	4:16	

== ONE Championship: Roots Of Honor ==
ONE Championship: Roots Of Honor
- Promotion: ONE Championship
- Date: April 12, 2019
- Venue: Mall of Asia Arena
- City: Pasay, Philippines

ONE Championship: Roots Of Honor (also known as ONE Championship 91) was a combat sport event held by ONE Championship on April 12, 2019, at the Mall of Asia Arena in Pasay, Philippines.

=== Background ===
Tang Kai was set to fight with Eric Kelly but he has to withdraw a week before the fight due to health issues. Kwon Won Il replaces Kai, takes short notice fight against Kelly.

=== Results ===
ONE: Roots Of Honor
Weight Class				Method	Round	Time	Notes
Featherweight 70 kg	(Australia) Martin Nguyen (c)	def.	(Mongolia) Jadamba Narantungalag	KO (Flying Knee)	2	1:07	For the ONE Featherweight World Championship
Strawweight 57 kg	(Philippines) Joshua Pacio	def.	(Japan) Yosuke Saruta (c)	KO (Head Kick)	4	2:43	For the ONE Strawweight World Championship
Flyweight 61 kg	(Japan) Tatsumitsu Wada	def.	(Cuba) Gustavo Balart	Decision (Unanimous)	3	5:00	Flyweight Grand-Prix Quarter-finals
Catchweight 68 kg	(Brazil) Leandro Issa	def.	(China) Fu Chang Xin	Submission (Armbar)	1	3:03	
Light Heavyweight 102 kg	(Romania) Andrei Stoica	def.	(Netherlands) Ibrahim El Bouni	Decision (Unanimous)	3	3:00	Kickboxing
Welterweight 84 kg	(United States) James Nakashima	def.	(Brazil) Luís Santos	TKO (Retirement)	2	0:56	
Featherweight 70 kg	(Philippines) Edward Kelly	def.	(South Korea) Sung Jong Lee	TKO (Punches)	2	2:51	
Heavyweight 120 kg	(Brazil) Anderson Silva	def.	(Australia) Andre Meunier	KO (Punch)	1	1:14	Kickboxing
Preliminary Card
Featherweight 70 kg	(South Korea) Kwon Won Il	def.	(Philippines) Eric Kelly	KO (Punches)	1	0:19	
Bantamweight 66 kg	(Thailand) Saemapetch Fairtex	def.	(United States) Ognjen Topic	Decision (Majority)	3	3:00	Muay Thai
Bantamweight 66 kg	(China) Xie Bin	def.	(Afghanistan) Ahmad Qais Jasoor	Submission (D'Arce Choke)	2	2:27	
Flyweight 61 kg	(Singapore) Niko Soe	def.	(Indonesia) Eko Roni Saputra	TKO (Doctor Stoppage)	1	1:03	
Flyweight 61 kg	(Thailand) Lerdsila Chumpairtour	def.	(Japan) Momotaro	Decision (Unanimous)	3	3:00	Muay Thai
Atomweight 52 kg	(United States) Bi Nguyen	def.	(Indonesia) Dwi Ani Retno Wulan	TKO (Elbows)	1	3:55	
Strawweight 57 kg	(Philippines) Ramon Gonzales	def.	(Japan) Akihiro Fujisawa	Submission (Guillotine Choke)	1	1:19	

== ONE Hero Series April ==
ONE Hero Series April
- Promotion: ONE Championship
- Date: April 22, 2019
- City: Beijing, China

ONE Hero Series April was a combat sport event held by ONE Championship on April 22, 2019, in Beijing, China.

=== Results ===
ONE Hero Series April
Weight Class				Method	Round	Time	Notes
Bantamweight 66 kg	(China) Pan Jia Yun	def.	(China) Fu Qing Nan	Decision (unanimous)	3	3:00	Kickboxing
Welterweight 84 kg	(China) Makeshate Sailike	def.	(China) Wurigenbayar	TKO (Punch)	1	2:15	
Strawweight 57 kg	(China) Ze Ru	def.	(China) Li Zhe	Submission (Rear-Naked Choke)	1	4:32	
Flyweight 61 kg	(China) Xie Wei	def.	(China) Yang Fu Chong	TKO (Punches)	2	0:33	
Bantamweight 66 kg	(China) Wang Jing Jia	def.	(China) Wan Jian Ping	Submission (Rear-Naked Choke)	1	3:40	
Featherweight 70 kg	(China) Lu Rui Lei	def.	(China) Luo Chao	Decision (Split)	3	3:00	Kickboxing
Bantamweight 66 kg	(China) MaiMaiTiTuoHati	def.	(China) Liu Meng Yu	TKO (Punches)	2	4:35	
Featherweight 70 kg	(China) Luo Zhou Jiang Cuo	def.	(China) Xie Xiao Hong	Submission (Triangle Choke)	1	4:04	
Strawweight 57 kg	(China) Yang Jia	def.	(China) Yang Ying Qiang	Decision (Unanimous)	3	3:00	

== ONE Warrior Series 5 ==
ONE Warrior Series 5
- Promotion: ONE Championship
- Date: April 25, 2019
- City: Kallang, Singapore

ONE Warrior Series 5 was a combat sport event held by ONE Championship on April 25, 2019, in Kallang, Singapore.

=== Results ===
ONE Warriors Series 5
Weight Class				Method	Round	Time	Notes
Welterweight 84 kg	(Brazil) Carlos Prates	def.	(Democratic Republic of the Congo) Gunther Kaluda	TKO (Retirement)	2	4:45	
Lightweight 77 kg	(Brunei) Ahmed Faez Anuar	def.	(India) Pardeep Kumar	Submission (Armbar)	2	4:53	
Bantamweight 66 kg	(Mongolia) Shinechagtga Zoltsetseg	def.	(Cambodia) Chan Samart	Decision (Unanimous)	3	5:00	
Featherweight 70 kg	(Philippines) Jerry Olsim	def.	(Japan) Hiroyasu Sakurai	Decision (Unanimous)	3	5:00	
Bantamweight 66 kg	(South Korea) Min Jong Song	def.	(Northern Ireland) Alan Philpott	Submission (Neck Crank)	2	4:38	
Bantamweight 66 kg	(Myanmar) Punnya Sai	def.	(Tajikistan) Shafkat Khodzhkulov	Decision (Unanimous)	3	5:00	
Lightweight 77 kg	(Australia) Kieran Joblin	def.	(United States) JD Hardwick	TKO (Knee and Punches)	3	2:47	
Strawweight 57 kg	(Australia) Kristy Obst	def.	(Spain) Claudia Diaz	TKO (Doctor Stoppage)	2	3:57	
Middleweight 93 kg	(Australia) Ricky Alchin	def.	(Japan) Koji Shikuwa	Decision (Unanimous)	3	5:00	
Strawweight 57 kg	(Brunei) Mohamad Norhidayat	def.	(Thailand) Sanya Kongkatonk	Submission (Arm-Triangle Choke)	1	4:12	
Strawweight 57 kg	(Philippines) Ismael Bandiwan	def.	(Malaysia) Arif Izzudin	TKO (Doctor Stoppage)	2	5:00	
Atomweight 52 kg	(India) Neha Kashyap	def.	(Malaysia) Roshnee Khaira	KO (Punches)	1	1:58	
Atomweight 52 kg	(Japan) Yuko Suzuki	def.	(South Korea) Ji Yeon Seo	Submission (Rear-Naked Choke)	1	4:59	
Flyweight 61 kg	(Australia) Philip Kim	def.	(South Korea) Tae Ho Bak	Submission (Rear-Naked Choke)	3	3:52	

== ONE Championship: For Honor ==
ONE Championship: For Honor
- Promotion: ONE Championship
- Date: May 3, 2019
- Venue: Istora Senayan
- City: Jakarta, Indonesia

ONE Championship: For Honor (also known as ONE Championship 92) was a combat sport event held by ONE Championship on May 3, 2019, at the Istora Senayan in Jakarta, Indonesia.

=== Background ===
This event features a title fight between the champion Sam-A Gaiyanghadao and Jonathan Haggerty for ONE Welterweight Championship as ONE Flyweight Muay Thai World Championship headliner.

=== Results ===
ONE: For Honor
Weight Class				Method	Round	Time	Notes
Flyweight 61 kg	(England) Jonathan Haggerty	def.	(Thailand) Sam-A Gaiyanghadao (c)	Decision (Unanimous)	5	3:00	For the ONE Flyweight Muay Thai World Championship
Welterweight 84 kg	(Kyrgyzstan) Kiamrian Abbasov	def.	(Japan) Yushin Okami	TKO (Punches)	2	1:10	
Featherweight 70 kg	(Russia) Marat Gafurov	def.	(Japan) Tetsuya Yamada	Decision (Unanimous)	3	5:00	
Bantamweight 66 kg	(Thailand) Yodpanomrung Jitmuangnon	def.	(England) Tyler Hardcastle	KO (Knee)	3	2:11	Muay Thai
Atomweight 52 kg	(Indonesia) Priscilla Gaol	def.	(Cambodia) Nou Srey Pov	Decision (Unanimous)	3	5:00	
Featherweight 70 kg	(United States) Thanh Le	def.	(Russia) Yusup Saadulaev	KO (Knee)	2	0:12	
Bantamweight 66 kg	(Indonesia) Sunoto Peringkat	def.	(Indonesia) Paul Lumihi	Decision (Unanimous)	3	5:00	
Bantamweight 66 kg	(South Korea) Dae Hwan Kim	def.	(China) Ayideng Jumayi	TKO (Punches)	1	4:11	
Preliminary Card
Featherweight 70 kg	(Japan) Ryogo Takahashi	def.	(Malaysia) Keanu Subba	TKO (Punches)	1	1:46	
Bantamweight 66 kg	(Japan) Kenta Yamada	def.	(Lithuania) Deividas Danyla	Decision (Split)	3	3:00	Muay Thai
Flyweight 61 kg	(Cambodia) Chan Rothana	def.	(Indonesia) Rudy Agustian	TKO (Punches)	2	2:50	
Bantamweight 66 kg	(Scotland) Andrew Miller	def.	(Malaysia) Mohammed Bin Mahmoud	Decision (Unanimous)	3	3:00	Muay Thai
Strawweight 57 kg	(Indonesia) Adrian Mattheis	def.	(India) Himanshu Kaushik	Submission (Rear-Naked Choke)	1	4:42	
Strawweight 57 kg	(Indonesia) Angelo Bimoadji	def.	(Indonesia) Guntur	Submission (Armbar)	1	4:56	

== ONE Championship: Warriors Of Light ==
ONE Championship: Warriors Of Light
- Promotion: ONE Championship
- Date: May 10, 2019
- Venue: IMPACT Arena
- City: Bangkok, Thailand

ONE Championship: Warriors Of Light (also known as ONE Championship 93) was a combat sport event held by ONE Championship on May 10, 2019, at the IMPACT Arena in Bangkok, Thailand.

=== Background ===
This event featured two world title fights for the ONE Muay Thai Bantamweight Championship Nong-O Gaiyanghadao vs. Hiroaki Suzuki as headliner and for the inaugural ONE Kickboxing Flyweight Championship Petchdam Gaiyanghadao vs. Elias Mahmoudi as co-headliner.

=== Results ===
ONE: Warriors Of Light
Weight Class				Method	Round	Time	Notes
Bantamweight 66 kg	(Thailand) Nong-O Gaiyanghadao (c)	def.	(Japan) Hiroaki Suzuki	Decision (Unanimous)	5	3:00	For the ONE Bantamweight Muay Thai World Championship
Flyweight 61 kg	(Thailand) Petchdam Petchyindee Academy	def.	(Algeria) Elias Mahmoudi	Technical Decision (Unanimous)	5	0:29	For the inaugural ONE Flyweight Kickboxing World Championship
Bantamweight 66 kg	(Japan) Shoko Sato	def.	(New Zealand) Mark Abelardo	TKO (Punches)	2	1:58	
Flyweight 61 kg	(Thailand) Rodtang Jitmuangnon	def.	(Cambodia) Sok Thy	KO (Leg Kicks)	2	1:36	Muay Thai
Strawweight 57 kg	(Thailand) Pongsiri Mitsatit	def.	(Philippines) Robin Catalan	KO (Knee to the Body)	1	3:05	
Bantamweight 66 kg	(China) Zhang Chenglong	def.	(Cyprus) Panicos Yusuf	Decision (Unanimous)	3	3:00	Kickboxing
Lightweight 77 kg	(Japan) Kazuki Tokudome	def.	(Papua New Guinea) Adrian Pang	TKO (Referee Stoppage)	2	1:27	
Preliminary Card
Flyweight 61 kg	(Cyprus) Savvas Michael	def.	(Thailand) Singtongnoi Por.Telakun	Decision (Unanimous)	3	3:00	Muay Thai
Flyweight 61 kg	(Thailand) Superlek Kiatmuu9	def.	(Portugal) Rui Botelho	Decision (Unanimous)	3	3:00	Muay Thai
Lightweight 77 kg	(Netherlands) Pieter Buist	def.	(Japan) Kota Shimoishi	KO (Knees)	2	3:55	
Atomweight 52 kg	(United States) Janet Todd	def.	(Taiwan) Wang Chin Long	TKO (3 Knockdown Rule)	2	2:59	Kickboxing
Strawweight 57 kg	(China) Hexigetu	def.	(Pakistan) Ovais Shah	Decision (Unanimous)	3	5:00	

== ONE Championship: Enter the Dragon ==
ONE Championship: Enter the Dragon
- Promotion: ONE Championship
- Date: May 17, 2019
- Venue: Singapore Indoor Stadium
- City: Kallang, Singapore

ONE Championship: Enter the Dragon (also known as ONE Championship 94) was a combat sport event held by ONE Championship on May 17, 2019, at the Singapore Indoor Stadium in Kallang, Singapore.

=== Background ===
The ONE Lightweight GP semi final bout between Ariel Sexton and Saygid Guseyn Arslanaliev was expected for ONE Championship: Enter the Dragon. On April 24, however, Sexton pulled out of the bout due to an arm injury. Amir Khan was pulled from a planned preliminary bout with Iurie Lapicus and faced Guseyn Arslanaliev in the GP semi final bout. Lapicus instead faced Shannon Wiratchai.

Andy Souwer was scheduled to face Jo Nattawut in the ONE Kickboxing Grand Prix quarter-finals, but Souwer has to withdraw from the bout due to undisclosed reasons. Sasha Moisa was pulled from a planned Grand Prix alternate bout with Daniel Dawson and faced Nattawut in the GP quarter-final bout. Dawson instead faced Brown Pinas in the GP alternate bout.

The bout between Giorgio Petrosyan and Phetmorakot Petchyindee Academy was originally a split decision win for Phetmorakot. However the ONE Championship competition committee has declared the bout a no contest.

=== Results ===
ONE: Enter the Dragon
Weight Class				Method	Round	Time	Notes
Lightweight 77 kg	(United States) Christian Lee	def.	(Japan) Shinya Aoki (c)	TKO (Punches)	2	0:51	For the ONE Lightweight World Championship
Lightweight 77 kg	(Suriname) Regian Eersel	def.	(Netherlands) Nieky Holzken	Decision (Unanimous)	5	3:00	For the ONE Lightweight Kickboxing World Championship
Featherweight 70 kg	(Thailand) Phetmorakot Petchyindee Academy	vs.	(Italy) Giorgio Petrosyan	No Contest	3	3:00	Kickboxing Featherweight Grand-Prix Quarter-finals
Featherweight 70 kg	(France) Samy Sana	def.	(Thailand) Yodsanklai Fairtex	Decision (Unanimous)	3	3:00	Kickboxing Featherweight Grand-Prix Quarter-finals
Welterweight 84 kg	(Brazil) Cosmo Alexandre	def.	(United States) Sage Northcutt	KO (Punches)	1	0:29	
Lightweight 77 kg	(Turkey) Saygid Guseyn Arslanaliev	def.	(Singapore) Amir Khan	KO (Punches)	1	2:56	Lightweight Grand-Prix Semi-finals
Flyweight 61 kg	(Philippines) Geje Eustaquio	def.	(South Korea) Kim Kyu Sung	Decision (Unanimous)	3	5:00	
Strawweight 57 kg	(China) Miao Li Tao	def.	(Thailand) Dejdamrong Sor Amnuaysirichoke	KO (Punches)	1	4:09	
Preliminary Card
Featherweight 70 kg	(Thailand) Jo Nattawut	def.	(Ukraine) Sasha Moisa	TKO (3 Knockdown Rule)	3	1:24	Kickboxing Featherweight Grand-Prix Quarter-finals
Strawweight 57 kg	(Japan) Yoshitaka Naito	def.	(Brazil) Alex Silva	Decision (Unanimous)	3	5:00	
Featherweight 70 kg	(United States) Garry Tonon	def.	(Japan) Yoshiki Nakahara	Submission (Heel Hook)	1	0:55	
Featherweight 70 kg	(Russia) Dzhabar Askerov	def.	(Germany) Enriko Kehl	Decision (Unanimous)	3	3:00	Kickboxing Featherweight Grand-Prix Quarter-finals
Atomweight 52 kg	(Japan) Mei Yamaguchi	def.	(Argentina) Laura Balin	Submission (Armbar)	1	3:46	
Lightweight 77 kg	(Moldova) Iuri Lapicus	def.	(Thailand) Shannon Wiratchai	Submission (Rear-Naked Choke)	3	3:10	
Featherweight 70 kg	(Australia) Daniel Dawson	def.	(Netherlands) Brown Pinas	Decision (Split)	3	3:00	Kickboxing Featherweight Grand-Prix Alternate Bout
Lightweight 77 kg	(India) Rahul Raju	def.	(Philippines) Richard Corminal	Submission (Rear-Naked Choke)	1	4:43	

== ONE Hero Series May ==
ONE Hero Series May
- Promotion: ONE Championship
- Date: May 27, 2019
- City: Beijing, China

ONE Hero Series May was a combat sport event held by ONE Championship on May 27, 2019, in Beijing, China.

=== Results ===
ONE Hero Series May
Weight Class				Method	Round	Time	Notes
Catchweight 80.5 kg	(China) Feng Xing Li	def.	(China) Liu Ya Ning	TKO (Cut)	1	2:28	Sanda
Catchweight 73 kg	(China) Jia Ao Qi	def.	(China) Jiao Dao Bo	TKO (Knees & Punches to the Body)	2	1:49	Sanda
Bantamweight 66 kg	(China) Meng Ketuogesi	def.	(China) Li Shuai Hu	Decision (Unanimous)	3	5:00	
Lightweight 77 kg	(China) Chang Shuai	def.	(China) Sun Shu Wei	Decision (Unanimous)	3	5:00	
Catchweight 71 kg	(China) Li Hong Jiang	def.	(China) Yi De Ri Gun	TKO (Corner Stoppage)	1	4:00	
Featherweight 70 kg	(China) Zhang Meng Fei	def.	(China) Zhang Shuai	TKO (Punch)	2	1:36	Kickboxing
Featherweight 70 kg	(China) Luo Chao	def.	(China) Zhang Wan Xin	TKO (Punches)	1	1:42	Kickboxing
Flyweight 61 kg	(China) Xiong Pi Ping	def.	(China) Wang Zhen	Decision (Unanimous)	3	5:00	
Catchweight 72 kg	(China) Shang Xi Feng	def.	(China) Zhang Ye	Decision (Split)	3	3:00	Kickboxing
Strawweight 57 kg	(China) Li Hong Lin	def.	(China) Sha Ni Du	TKO (Punches)	1	2:48	
Flyweight 61 kg	(China) Li Yuan Kun	def.	(China) Zhang Tao	Decision (Unanimous)	3	3:00	Kickboxing

== ONE Hero Series June ==
ONE Hero Series June
- Promotion: ONE Championship
- Date: June 14, 2019
- City: Shanghai, China

ONE Hero Series June was a combat sport event held by ONE Championship on June 14, 2019, in Shanghai, China.

=== Results ===
ONE Hero Series June
Weight Class				Method	Round	Time	Notes
Bantamweight 66 kg	(China) Fu Qing Nan	def.	(China) Liu Wei	Decision (Unanimous)	3	5:00	Kickboxing
Flyweight 61 kg	(China) Xie Wei	def.	(China) Liu Deligerihu	TKO (Punches)	1	2:13	
Catchweight 65 kg	(China) Lu Jun	def.	(China) Song Xu Kui	KO (Punch)	2	0:36	Kickboxing
Bantamweight 66 kg	(China) Ahejiang Ailinuer	def.	(China) Zhong Qing Ya	TKO (Punches)	1	3:31	
Welterweight 84 kg	(China) Wurigenbayar	def.	(China) Kurbanjiang Tuluosibake	TKO (Punches)	1	0:42	
Flyweight 61 kg	(China) Hu Yong	def.	(China) Huyixibai	DQ (Illegal Slam)	3	4:22	
Bantamweight 66 kg	(China) Maimaitituoheti	def.	(China) Wang Jing Jia	TKO (Punches)	3	4:33	
Flyweight 61 kg	(China) Yan Zhi Yuan	def.	(China) Yang Fu Chong	Decision (Unanimous)	3	5:00	
Flyweight 61 kg	(China) Li Hao Jie	def.	(China) Huang Yan Chuan	KO (Head Kick)	3	4:17	
Strawweight 57 kg	(China) Li Zhe	def.	(China) Wang Mao Lun	Submission (Arm-Triangle Choke)	1	1:45	
Strawweight 57 kg	(China) Cai Xiong Xiong	def.	(China) Tasiken Jumatai	Technical Decision	3	5:00	

== ONE Championship: Legendary Quest ==
ONE Championship: Legendary Quest
- Promotion: ONE Championship
- Date: June 15, 2019
- Venue: Baoshan Arena
- City: Shanghai, China

ONE Championship: Legendary Quest (also known as ONE Championship 95) was a combat sport event held by ONE Championship on June 15, 2019, at the Baoshan Arena in Shanghai, China.

=== Background ===
This event features a title fight between the champion Stamp Fairtex and Alma Juniku for ONE Muay Thai Women's Atomweight Championship as ONE: Legendary Quest headliner.

=== Results ===
ONE: Legendary Quest
Weight Class				Method	Round	Time	Notes
Atomweight 52 kg	(Thailand) Stamp Fairtex (c)	def.	(Australia) Alma Juniku	Decision (Unanimous)	5	5:00	For the ONE Women's Atomweight Muay Thai World Championship
Welterweight 84 kg	(Malaysia) Agilan Thani	def.	(Japan) Yoshihiro Akiyama	Decision (Unanimous)	3	5:00	
Bantamweight 66 kg	(China) Zhang Chenglong	def.	(Australia) Tyler Hardcastle	KO (Punch)	1	1:54	Kickboxing
Bantamweight 66 kg	(China) Han Zihao	def.	(Scotland) Andrew Miller	KO (Punches)	2	2:36	Muay Thai
Featherweight 70 kg	(Japan) Koyomi Matsushima	def.	(South Korea) Kwon Won Il	Decision (Unanimous)	3	5:00	
Light Heavyweight 102 kg	(Morocco) Tarik Khbabez	def.	(Brazil) Anderson Silva	Decision (Unanimous)	3	3:00	Kickboxing
Middleweight 93 kg	(Netherlands) Reinier de Ridder	def.	(Brazil) Gilberto Galvao	TKO (Knees)	2	0:57	
Featherweight 70 kg	(Thailand) Rodlek P.K. Saenchaimuaythaigym	def.	(England) Liam Harrison	Decision (Unanimous)	3	3:00	Muay Thai
Preliminary Card
Catchweight 67.5 kg	(China) Chen Lei	def.	(Netherlands) Anthony Engelen	Decision (Unanimous)	3	5:00	
Middleweight 93 kg	(China) Fan Rong	def.	(Egypt) Sherif Mohamed	TKO (Punches)	2	3:50	
Bantamweight 66 kg	(China) Niu Kang Kang	def.	(Philippines) Eric Kelly	Decision (Unanimous)	3	5:00	
Lightweight 77 kg	(South Korea) Yoon Chang Min	def.	(Philippines) Trestle Tan	TKO (Punch)	1	4:05	
Atomweight 52 kg	(Japan) Itsuki Hirata	def.	(Philippines) Angelie Sabanal	Submission (Americana)	1	2:59	
Featherweight 70 kg	(Myanmar) Phoe Thaw	def.	(Indonesia) Victorio Senduk	KO (Punches)	1	4:17	

== ONE Warrior Series 6 ==
ONE Warrior Series 6
- Promotion: ONE Championship
- Date: June 20, 2019
- City: Kallang, Singapore

ONE Warrior Series 6 was a combat sport event held by ONE Championship on June 20, 2019, in Kallang, Singapore.

=== Results ===
ONE Warriors Series 6
Weight Class				Method	Round	Time	Notes
Featherweight 70 kg	(Mongolia) Shinechagtga Zoltsetseg	def.	(South Korea) Hyunjin Lee	TKO (Punches)	1	1:21	
Featherweight 70 kg	(Philippines) Jerry Olsim	def.	(South Korea) Myeong Gu Kim	Decision (Unanimous)	3	5:00	
Welterweight 84 kg	(United States) De’Von Morris	def.	(India) Javed Mulla	Submission (Armbar)	1	0:43	
Welterweight 84 kg	(Russia) Gadzhimurad Abdulaev	def.	(Brazil) Carlos Prates	Decision (Unanimous)	3	5:00	
Featherweight 70 kg	(Northern Ireland) Alan Philpott	def.	(United States) Zechariah Lange	Decision (Unanimous)	3	5:00	
Lightweight 77 kg	(Japan) Takuya Nagata	def.	(Australia) Kieran Joblin	TKO (Retirement)	1	5:00	
Atomweight 52 kg	(South Korea) Ji Yeon Seo	def.	(Malaysia) Edilah Johany	TKO (Punches)	3	3:48	
Strawweight 57 kg	(Pakistan) Irfan Ahmad	def.	(Nepal) Sandeep Gurung	Submission (Armbar)	1	1:27	
Strawweight 57 kg	(Philippines) Dave Banguigui	def.	(India) Susovan Ghosh	KO (Punch)	2	3:58	
Strawweight 57 kg	(India) Manthan Rane	def.	(Philippines) Allan Albindo	Deacision (Unanimous)	3	5:00	
Flyweight 61 kg	(Myanmar) Sai Nyan Lin	def.	(Thailand) Peter Danasoe	Submission (Triangle Choke)	3	2:15	
Flyweight 61 kg	(New Zealand) Viet Anh Do	def.	(South Korea) Tae Ho Bak	TKO (Punches)	1	0:48	
Atomweight 52 kg	(Japan) Satomi Takano	def.	(Brazil) Michele Ferreira	Submission (Armbar)	2	2:56	
Featherweight 70 kg	(Malaysia) Jace Law	def.	(South Korea) Jong Heon Kim	TKO (Punches)	1	0:07	
Welterweight 84 kg	(Democratic Republic of the Congo) Gunther Kalunda	def.	(Iran) Mehdi Bagheri	TKO (Head Kick and Knee)	2	0:56	
Welterweight 84 kg	(China) Xie Xiaoxiang	def.	(Thailand) Nat Natchayangkul	TKO (Punches)	2	4:13	

== ONE Championship: Masters Of Destiny ==
ONE Championship: Masters Of Destiny
- Promotion: ONE Championship
- Date: July 12, 2019
- Venue: Axiata Arena
- City: Kuala Lumpur, Malaysia

ONE Championship: Masters Of Destiny (also known as ONE Championship 96) was a combat sport event held by ONE Championship on July 12, 2019, at the Axiata Arena in Kuala Lumpur, Malaysia.

=== Background ===
This event featured the Grand-Prix Quarter-finals rematch between Giorgio Petrosyan and Phetmorakot Petchyindee Academy as ONE: Masters Of Destiny headliner.

=== Results ===
ONE: Masters Of Destiny
Weight Class				Method	Round	Time	Notes
Featherweight 70 kg	(Italy) Giorgio Petrosyan	def.	(Thailand) Phetmorakot Petchyindee Academy	Decision (Unanimous)	3	3:00	Kickboxing Featherweight Grand-Prix Quarter-finals
Strawweight 57 kg	(Brazil) Michelle Nicolini	def.	(United States) Angela Lee	Decision (Unanimous)	3	5:00	
Lightweight 77 kg	(Malaysia) Ev Ting	def.	(Japan) Daichi Abe	Submission (Rear-Naked Choke)	2	4:44	
Flyweight 61 kg	(Canada) Gurdarshan Mangat	def.	(Indonesia) Abro Fernandes	Decision (Unanimous)	3	5.00	
Atomweight 52 kg	(Malaysia) Jihin Radzuan	def.	(Philippines) Jomary Torres	Submission (Triangle Choke)	1	3:07	
Bantamweight 66 kg	(United States) Troy Worthen	def.	(China) Chen Rui	TKO (Punches)	2	3:39	
Flyweight 61 kg	(Japan) Hiroki Akimoto	def.	(Australia) Kenny Tse	Decision (Unanimous)	3	3:00	Kickboxing
Preliminary Card
Atomweight 52 kg	(United States) Janet Todd	def.	(Taiwan) Kai Ting Chuang	Decision (Majority)	3	3:00	Kickboxing
Lightweight 77 kg	(South Korea) Dae Sung Park	def.	(Japan) Kimihiro Eto	TKO (Punches)	2	1:59	
Flyweight 61 kg	(Finland) Aleksi Toivonen	def.	(Japan) Akihiro Fujisawa	Submission (Rear-Naked Choke)	1	3:27	
Bantamweight 66 kg	(Malaysia) Mohammed Bin Mahmoud	def.	(Malaysia) Saiful Merican	Decision (Unanimous)	3	3:00	Muay Thai
Strawweight 57 kg	(Indonesia) Adrian Mattheis	def.	(China) Liu Peng Shuai	TKO (Punches)	2	1:51	
Atomweight 52 kg	(Myanmar) Bozhena Antoniyar	def.	(United States) Bi Nguyen	Decision (Split)	3	5:00	
Featherweight 70 kg	(Thailand) Sorgraw Petchyindee	def.	(Scotland) George Mann	Decision (Split)	3	3:00	Muay Thai
Flyweight 61 kg	(Australia) Josh Tonna	def.	(Japan) Yoshihisa Morimoto	Decision (Unanimous)	3	3:00	Kickboxing

== ONE Hero Series July ==
ONE Hero Series July
- Promotion: ONE Championship
- Date: July 21, 2019
- City: Beijing, China

ONE Hero Series July was a combat sport event held by ONE Championship on July 21, 2019, in Beijing, China.

=== Results ===
ONE Hero Series July
Weight Class				Method	Round	Time	Notes
Featherweight 70 kg	(China) Zhang Wan Xin	def.	(China) Lu Rui Lei	Decision (Unanimous)	3	5:00	Kickboxing
Bantamweight 66 kg	(China) Wang Jing Jia	def.	(China) Liu Meng Yu	Decision (Split)	3	5:00	
Featherweight 70 kg	(China) Luo Chao	def.	(China) Zhang Meng Fei	TKO (Punches)	2	2:54	Kickboxing
Bantamweight 66 kg	(China) Ze Ru	def.	(China) Li Hong Lin	Submission (Rear-Naked Choke)	2	2:32	
Catchweight 63 kg	(China) Fan Jiale	def.	(China) Xiatihe Zhumatai	Submission (Rear-Naked Choke)	1	4:42	
Bantamweight 66 kg	(China) Zhang Shuai	def.	(China) Hu Bin Qian	Decision (Unanimous)	3	5:00	
Catchweight 65 kg	(China) Meng Ketuogesi	def.	(China) Xia Ming Quan	TKO (Punches)	2	2:45	
Flyweight 61 kg	(China) Huang Ding	def.	(China) Yuan Hao	TKO (Knees)	2	1:16	Muay Thai

== ONE Championship: Dawn Of Heroes ==
ONE Championship: Dawn Of Heroes
- Promotion: ONE Championship
- Date: August 2, 2019
- Venue: Mall of Asia Arena
- City: Pasay, Philippines

ONE Championship: Dawn Of Heroes was a combat sport event held by ONE Championship on August 2, 2019, at the Mall of Asia Arena in Pasay, Philippines.

=== Background ===
The Flyweight Grand-Prix Semi-finals bout between Danny Kingad and Kairat Akhmetov was expected for the ONE Championship: Dawn Of Heroes main card. On July 8, however, Akhmetov was forced to withdraw due to an injury. Reece McLaren was pulled from a planned preliminary card bout with Yuya Wakamatsu and faced Kingad in the Grand-Prix Semi-finals bout. Wakamatsu instead faced the former ONE Flyweight World Champion Geje Eustaquio, who stepped in on short notice for this encounter.

Mauro Cerilli was forced to withdraw from his scheduled fight against Arjan Bhullar due to undisclosed reasons, forcing the fight to be cancelled.

=== Results ===
ONE: Dawn Of Heroes
Weight Class				Method	Round	Time	Notes
Featherweight 70 kg	(Australia) Martin Nguyen (c)	def.	(Japan) Koyomi Matsushima	TKO (Punches)	2	4:40	For the ONE Featherweight World Championship
Flyweight 61 kg	(Thailand) Rodtang Jitmuangnon	def.	(England) Jonathan Haggerty (c)	Decision (Unanimous)	5	3:00	For the ONE Flyweight Muay Thai World Championship
Lightweight 77 kg	(United States) Eddie Alvarez	def.	(Philippines) Eduard Folayang	Submission (Rear-Naked Choke)	1	2:16	Lightweight Grand-Prix Semi-finals
Flyweight 61 kg	(United States) Demetrious Johnson	def.	(Japan) Tatsumitsu Wada	Decision (Unanimous)	3	5:00	Flyweight Grand-Prix Semi-finals
Flyweight 61 kg	(Philippines) Danny Kingad	def.	(Australia) Reece McLaren	Decision (Split)	3	5:00	Flyweight Grand-Prix Semi-finals
Bantamweight 66 kg	(Thailand) Rodlek P.K. Saenchaimuaythaigym	def.	(Scotland) Andrew Miller	KO (Punch)	3	0:49	Muay Thai
Preliminary Card
Flyweight 61 kg	(Japan) Yuya Wakamatsu	def.	(Philippines) Geje Eustaquio	KO (Punches)	1	1:59	Flyweight Grand-Prix Reserve Bout
Lightweight 77 kg	(South Korea) Dae Sung Park	def.	(Philippines) Honorio Banario	Decision (Unanimous)	3	5:00	
Bantamweight 66 kg	(Japan) Daichi Takenaka	def.	(Brazil) Leandro Issa	TKO (Punches)	3	1:39	
Welterweight 84 kg	(United States) James Nakashima	def.	(Japan) Yushin Okami	Decision (Unanimous)	3	5:00	
Featherweight 70 kg	(China) Xie Bin	def.	(Philippines) Edward Kelly	Technical Decision (Unanimous)	2	3:32	
Strawweight 57 kg	(China) Miao Li Tao	def.	(Thailand) Pongsiri Mitsatit	Decision (Unanimous)	3	5:00	
Strawweight 57 kg	(Japan) Ayaka Miura	def.	(Brazil) Samara Santos	Submission (Americana)	2	0:39	
Bantamweight 66 kg	(Malaysia) Muhammad Airman	def.	(Indonesia) Sunoto Peringkat	Decision (Unanimous)	3	5:00	

== ONE Warrior Series 7 ==
ONE Warrior Series 7
- Promotion: ONE Championship
- Date: August 6, 2019
- City: Kallang, Singapore

ONE Warrior Series 7 was a combat sport event held by ONE Championship on August 6, 2019, in Kallang, Singapore.

=== Results ===
ONE Warriors Series 7
Weight Class				Method	Round	Time	Notes
Strawweight 57 kg	(Philippines) Lito Adiwang	def.	(Vietnam) Anthony Do	Decision (Unanimous)	3	5:00	
Catchweight 68 kg	(Northern Ireland) Alan Philpott	def.	(South Korea) Myeong Gu Kim	TKO (Knee)	3	1:24	
Bantamweight 66 kg	(Iran) Ali Motamed	def.	(United States) Zechariah Lange	Decision (Unanimous)	3	5:00	
Flyweight 61 kg	(South Korea) Da Woon Jung	def.	(Thailand) Detchadin Sornsirisuphathin	TKO (Punches)	1	4:28	
Welterweight 84 kg	(Australia) Joseph Luciano	def.	(Japan) Koji Shikuwa	Decision (Unanimous)	3	5:00	
Strawweight 57 kg	(Philippines) Ismael Bandiwan	def.	(Brunei) Adib Sulaiman	TKO (Punches)	3	1:03	
Strawweight 57 kg	(Australia) Caitlin McEwen	def.	(Philippines) Jenelyn Olsim	Submission (Armbar)	1	0:59	
Bantamweight 66 kg	(United States) Michael Walker	def.	(Japan) Akuri Ronda	Decision (Unanimous)	3	5:00	
Strawweight 57 kg	(Philippines) Dave Bangguigui	def.	(Brazil) Alber Correia Da Silva	Submission (Rear-Naked Choke)	2	4:42	
Bantamweight 66 kg	(Myanmar) Punnya Sai	def.	(India) Raghvendra Singh	Submission (Rear-Naked Choke)	1	2:52	
Atomweight 52 kg	(Australia) Uyen Ha	def.	(India) Neha Kashyap	TKO (Punches)	2	2:29	
Strawweight 57 kg	(Philippines) Allan Albindo	def.	(Malaysia) Arif Izzudin	TKO (Punches)	3	0:45	
Strawweight 57 kg	(Indonesia) Toreq	def.	(Brunei) Hidayat Abdul	TKO (Injury)	1	4:41	
Flyweight 61 kg	(Myanmar) Sai Nyan Lin	def.	(Malaysia) Matt Korro	Submission (Triangle Choke)	1	3:17	
Strawweight 57 kg	(Malaysia) Lehe	def.	(Singapore) Bryan Tee	TKO (Elbow)	1	1:30	Muay Thai

== ONE Championship: Dreams of Gold ==
ONE Championship: Dreams of Gold
- Promotion: ONE Championship
- Date: August 16, 2019
- Venue: IMPACT Arena
- City: Bangkok, Thailand

ONE Championship: Dreams of Gold (also known as ONE Championship 98) was a combat sport event held by ONE Championship on August 16, 2019, at the IMPACT Arena in Bangkok, Thailand.

=== Background ===
Shuya Kamikubo was scheduled to face Yusup Saadulaev in the main card, but Kamikubo was forced off the card due to an eye infection. Former ONE bantamweight title challenger Dae Hwan Kim served as Kamikubo replacement, takes short notice fight against Saadulaev.

=== Results ===
ONE: Dreams of Gold
Weight Class				Method	Round	Time	Notes
Flyweight 61 kg	(Netherlands) Ilias Ennahachi	def.	(Thailand) Petchdam Petchyindee Academy (c)	KO (Punches)	3	0:59	For the ONE Flyweight Kickboxing World Championship
Featherweight 70 kg	(Italy) Giorgio Petrosyan	def.	(Thailand) Jo Nattawut	KO (Punch)	1	2:50	Kickboxing Featherweight Grand-Prix Semi-finals
Atomweight 52 kg	(Thailand) Stamp Fairtex	def.	(India) Asha Roka	Submission (Rear-Naked Choke)	3	1:29	
Featherweight 70 kg	(France) Samy Sana	def.	(Russia) Dzhabar Askerov	Decision (Majority)	3	3:00	Kickboxing Featherweight Grand-Prix Semi-finals
Strawweight 57 kg	(Brazil) Alex Silva	def.	(Indonesia) Stefer Rahardian	Submission (Armbar)	2	4:55	
Bantamweight 66 kg	(Thailand) Muangthai PKSaenchaimuaythaigym	def.	(Japan) Kenta Yamada	Decision (Unanimous)	3	3:00	Muay Thai
Featherweight 70 kg	(United States) Thanh Le	def.	(South Korea) Kotetsu Boku	KO (Body kick and Punches)	1	1:28	
Preliminary Card
Flyweight 61 kg	(Thailand) Lerdsila Chumpairtour	def.	(Cyprus) Michael Savvas	TKO (Shoulder Injury)	2	0:29	Muay Thai
Featherweight 70 kg	(Russia) Yusup Saadulaev	def.	(South Korea) Dae Hwan Kim	Decision (Unanimous)	3	5:00	
Flyweight 61 kg	(Cambodia) Chan Rothana	def.	(Cuba) Gustavo Balart	Decision (Unanimous)	3	5:00	
Featherweight 70 kg	(Thailand) Bangpleenoi Petchyindee Academy	def.	(England) Liam Nolan	Decision (Majority)	3	3:00	Muay Thai
Strawweight 57 kg	(Japan) Ryuto Sawada	def.	(Indonesia) Aziz Calim	Submission (Rear-Naked Choke)	1	1:09	
Bantamweight 66 kg	(Russia) Alaverdi Ramazanov	def.	(Serbia) Ognjen Topic	KO (Punch)	1	2:25	Muay Thai
Bantamweight 66 kg	(China) Zhao Zhi Kang	def.	(Indonesia) Paul Lumihi	Submission (Rear-Naked Choke)	2	4:08	

== ONE Hero Series August ==
ONE Hero Series August
- Promotion: ONE Championship
- Date: August 26, 2019
- City: Beijing, China

ONE Hero Series August was a combat sport event held by ONE Championship on August 26, 2019, in Beijing, China.

=== Results ===
ONE Hero Series August
Weight Class				Method	Round	Time	Notes
Catchweight 73.5 kg	(China) Liu Gui Cheng	def.	(China) Xu Liu	Decision (Unanimous)	3	5:00	Kickboxing
Bantamweight 66 kg	(China) Pan Jia Yun	def.	(China) Liu Wei	Decision (Unanimous)	3	5:00	Kickboxing
Featherweight 70 kg	(China) Luo Zhou Jiang Cuo	def.	(China) Li Hong Jiang	Submission (Triangle Choke)	2	0:00	
Catchweight 63 kg	(China) Zhang Tao	def.	(China) Yang Hua	Decision (Unanimous)	3	5:00	Kickboxing
Strawweight 57 kg	(China) Bian Ye	def.	(China) Wang Mao Lun	TKO (Body Kick And Punches)	1	0:00	
Lightweight 77 kg	(China) Yuan Yi	def.	(China) Wang Hu	Submission (Arm-Triangle Choke)	2	0:00	
Flyweight 61 kg	(China) Wang Jia Le	def.	(China) Huang Ding	TKO (Punches)	3	0:00	Muay Thai
Flyweight 61 kg	(China) Zhao Bo Shi	def.	(China) Liu Hai Yang	Decision (Unanimous)	3	5:00	Muay Thai
Bantamweight 66 kg	(China) Xie Xiao Hong	def.	(China) Meng Ketuogesi	Decision (Unanimous)	3	5:00	
Flyweight 61 kg	(China) Yan Zhi Yuan	def.	(China) Wen Yun Bin	Decision (Unanimous)	3	5:00	
Flyweight 61 kg	(China) Wei Zi Qin	def.	(China) Liu Quan	KO (Punch)	2	0:00	Kickboxing

== ONE Championship: Immortal Triumph ==
ONE Championship: Immortal Triumph
- Promotion: ONE Championship
- Date: September 6, 2019
- Venue: Phú Thọ Indoor Stadium
- City: Ho Chi Minh City, Vietnam

ONE Championship: Immortal Triumph (also known as ONE Championship 99) was a combat sport event held by ONE Championship on September 6, 2019, at the Phú Thọ Indoor Stadium in Ho Chi Minh City, Vietnam.

=== Background ===
Rafi Bohic has been forced to withdraw from his scheduled co main event bout against Saemapetch Fairtex due to an injury, Azize Hlali has stepped in as a replacement. Unfortunately, Hlali has been unable to compete. Fairtex instead faced Adam Larfi, who stepped in on a weeks notice for this encounter. On fight day, Adam Larfi was pulled out of the fight due to skin infection and the bout with Fairtex was scrapped.

Thanonchai SomawangGaiyang has been forced to withdraw from his scheduled fight against Kohei Kodera due to undisclosed reasons. Kodera instead faced the Lumpinee Muay Thai World Champion Singtongnoi Por Telakun, who stepped in on short notice for this encounter.

A featherweight bout between Thanh Tung Nguyen and Shahzaib Rindh was previously scheduled for ONE: Immortal Triumph. However, Nguyen pulled out of the fight for undisclosed reasons and the bout was scrapped.

=== Results ===
ONE: Immortal Triumph
Weight Class				Method	Round	Time	Notes
Bantamweight 66 kg	(Thailand) Nong-O Gaiyanghadao (c)	def.	(France) Brice Deval	Decision (Split)	5	3:00	For the ONE Bantamweight Muay Thai World Championship
Bantamweight 66 kg	(Thailand) Kulabdam Sor.Jor.Piek-U-Thai	def.	(France) Bobo Sacko	Decision (Unanimous)	3	3:00	Muay Thai
Flyweight 61 kg	(Vietnam) Nguyễn Trần Duy Nhất	def.	(Malaysia) Azwan Che Wil	KO (Punch)	3	2:45	Muay Thai
Light Heavyweight 102 kg	(Brazil) Anderson Silva	def.	(Russia) Beybulat Isaev	KO (Punches)	1	2:19	Kickboxing
Flyweight 61 kg	(Australia) Chris Nguyen	def.	(Japan) Yukinori Ogasawara	Decision (Unanimous)	3	3:00	Muay Thai
Atomweight 52 kg	(United States) Bi Nguyen	def.	(India) Puja Tomar	Decision (Split)	3	3:00	Muay Thai
Flyweight 61 kg	(Thailand) Panpayak Jitmuangnon	def.	(Japan) Masahide Kudo	Decision (Unanimous)	3	3:00	Kickboxing
Preliminary Card
Flyweight 61 kg	(Thailand) Mongkolpetch Petchyindee	def.	(Italy) Joseph Lasiri	Decision (Majority)	3	3:00	Muay Thai
Welterweight 84 kg	(Netherlands) Santino Verbeek	def.	(England) Juan Cervantes	Decision (Majority)	3	3:00	Kickboxing
Flyweight 61 kg	(Japan) Kohei Kodera	def.	(Thailand) Singtongnoi Por.Telakun	KO (Punches)	1	0:41	Muay Thai
Strawweight 57 kg	(Slovakia) Viktoria Lipianska	def.	(England) Amber Kitchen	Decision (Split)	3	3:00	Muay Thai
Featherweight 70 kg	(England) Michael Pham	def.	(Malaysia) Mohamad Fakri	Decision (Unanimous)	3	3:00	Muay Thai

== ONE Hero Series September ==
ONE Hero Series September
- Promotion: ONE Championship
- Date: September 23, 2019
- City: Beijing, China

ONE Hero Series September was a combat sport event held by ONE Championship on September 23, 2019, in Beijing, China.

=== Results ===
ONE Hero Series September
Weight Class				Method	Round	Time	Notes
Flyweight 61 kg	(China) Xie Wei	def.	(China) Zou Jin Bo	TKO (Ground & Pound)	1	4:35	
Lightweight 77 kg	(China) Lu Zheng	def.	(China) Ding Meng	KO (Head Kick)	1	2:36	
Lightweight 77 kg	(China) Hu Si Le	def.	(China) Kurbanjiang Tuluosibake	Decision (Unanimous)	3	5:00	
Bantamweight 66 kg	(China) Huyixibai	def.	(China) Wang Jing Jia	Decision (Unanimous)	3	5:00	
Flyweight 61 kg	(China) Li Yuan Kun	def.	(China) Wang Chen Hao	TKO (Punches)	1	0:39	Kickboxing
Catchweight 80 kg	(China) Gao Bo	def.	(China) A Gu De Mu	Submission (Armbar)	1		
Catchweight 67.1 kg	(China) Zhang Shuai	def.	(China) Wang Wu Ling	Decision (Unanimous)	3	5:00	Kickboxing
Catchweight 58.5 kg	(China) Huang Yan Chuan	def.	(China) Liua Zhi Peng	Submission (Modified Americana)	1		
Catchweight 63.5 kg	(China) Xia Ming Quan	def.	(China) Gui Yan Zhao	Submission (Triangle Armbar)	1		
Flyweight 61 kg	(China) Huang Shuai Lu	def.	(China) Song Dong Dong	Decision (Unanimous)	3	5:00	Kickboxing
Flyweight 61 kg	(China) Yang Fu Chong	def.	(China) Zhang Yu Sen	TKO (Knees & Punches)	2	0:31	

== ONE Warrior Series 8 ==
ONE Warrior Series 8
- Promotion: ONE Championship
- Date: October 5, 2019
- Venue: Bellesalle Shibuya Garden
- City: Tokyo, Japan

ONE Warrior Series 8 was a combat sport event held by ONE Championship on October 5, 2019, at the Bellesalle Shibuya Garden in Tokyo, Japan.

=== Results ===
ONE Warriors Series 8
Weight Class				Method	Round	Time	Notes
Welterweight 84 kg	(Nigeria) Emmanuel Onyedikachi	def.	(United States) Devon Morris	Technical Decision (Unanimous)	3	4:28	
Featherweight 70 kg	(Japan) Ryoji Kudo	def.	(Philippines) Jerry Olsim	Decision (Unanimous)	3	5:00	
Atomweight 52 kg	(Sweden) Sandra Godvik	def.	(Japan) Ayaka Miyauchi	Decision (Unanimous)	3	5:00	Muay Thai
Bantamweight 66 kg	(South Korea) Min Jong Song	def.	(Japan) Kodai Murata	Decision (Unanimous)	4	5:00	
Flyweight 61 kg	(Japan) Nobutaka Naito	def.	(United States) Alex Schild	Decision (Unanimous)	3	5:00	
Bantamweight 66 kg	(Japan) Hikaru Yoshino	def.	(Cambodia) Chan Samart	Decision (Unanimous)	3	5:00	
Atomweight 52 kg	(South Korea) So Yul Kim	def.	(Japan) Satomi Takano	Decision (Unanimous)	3	5:00	
Lightweight 77 kg	(Mongolia) Otgonbaatar Nergui	def.	(Japan) Takuya Nagata	Submission (Guillotine Choke)	1	4:10	
Featherweight 70 kg	(Japan) Asuka Tsubaki	def.	(Cambodia) Long La	TKO (Punches)	2	4:27	
Lightweight 77 kg	(Brunei) Ahmed Faez Anuar	def.	(Japan) Ryuichi Yamashita	Submission (Triangle Choke)	1	4:55	
Lightweight 77 kg	(United States) Sean Rush	def.	(Japan) Koki Shimokawa	TKO (3 Knockdown Rule)	2	2:11	Kickboxing
Atomweight 52 kg	(Japan) Yuko Suzuki	def.	(Malaysia) Edilah Johany	Submission (Armbar)	1	2:12	
Catchweight 74 kg	(Japan) Hiroyasu Sakurai	def.	(Japan) Naoki Shimamura	Decision (Split)	3	5:00	
Catchweight 55 kg	(Japan) Shoa Arii	def.	(Malaysia) Lehe	TKO (Referee Stoppage)	3	1:54	
Strawweight 57 kg	(Japan) Kanta Motoyama	def.	(Indonesia) Cep Holik	Decision (Unanimous)	3	5:00	Kickboxing

== ONE Championship: Century ==
ONE Championship: Century
- Promotion: ONE Championship
- Date: October 13, 2019
- Venue: Ryōgoku Kokugikan
- City: Tokyo, Japan

ONE Championship: Century (also known as ONE Championship 100) was a combat sport event held by ONE Championship on October 13, 2019, at the Ryōgoku Kokugikan in Tokyo, Japan.

=== Background ===
This event marked ONE Championship's historic 100th show.

=== Results ===
==== Part 1 ====
ONE: Century Part 1
Weight Class				Method	Round	Time	Notes
Atomweight 52 kg	(United States) Angela Lee (c)	def.	(China) Xiong Jingnan	Submission (Rear-Naked Choke)	5	4:48	For the ONE Women's Atomweight World Championship
Flyweight 61 kg	(United States) Demetrious Johnson	def.	(Philippines) Danny Kingad	Decision (Unanimous)	3	5:00	Flyweight Grand-Prix Final
Atomweight 52 kg	(United States) Janet Todd	def.	(Belarus) Ekaterina Vandaryeva	KO (Head Kick)	2	2:20	Muay Thai
Lightweight 77 kg	(United States) Christian Lee	def.	(Turkey) Saygid Guseyn Arslanaliev	Decision (Unanimous)	3	5:00	Lightweight Grand-Prix Final
Preliminary Card
Flyweight 61 kg	(Japan) Yuya Wakamatsu	def.	(South Korea) Dae Hwan Kim	Decision (Unanimous)	3	5:00	
Strawweight 57 kg	(Thailand) Sam-A Gaiyanghadao	def.	(France) Darren Rolland	KO (Punches)	2	1:20	Muay Thai
Welterweight 84 kg	(Japan) Yushin Okami	def.	(Malaysia) Agilan Thani	Decision (Split)	3	5:00	
Atomweight 52 kg	(Japan) Itsuki Hirata	def.	(Thailand) Rika Ishige	Submission (Armbar)	2	4:41	
Strawweight 57 kg	(Philippines) Lito Adiwang	def.	(Japan) Senzo Ikeda	TKO (Arm Injury)	1	1:57	
Featherweight 70 kg	(South Korea) Yoon Chang Min	def.	(Myanmar) Phoe Thaw	Submission (Rear-Naked Choke)	1	3:17	
Catchweight 68 kg	(South Korea) Kwon Won Il	def.	(Indonesia) Sunoto Peringkat	TKO (Punches)	1	1:43	

==== Part 2 ====
ONE: Century Part 2
Weight Class				Method	Round	Time	Notes
Light Heavyweight 102 kg	(Myanmar) Aung La Nsang (c)	def.	(United States) Brandon Vera	TKO (Punches)	2	3:23	For the ONE Light Heavyweight World Championship
Bantamweight 66 kg	(Brazil) Bibiano Fernandes (c)	def.	(Philippines) Kevin Belingon	Submission (Rear-Naked Choke)	2	2:16	For the ONE Bantamweight World Championship
Flyweight 61 kg	(Thailand) Rodtang Jitmuangnon (c)	def.	(Brazil) Walter Goncalves	Decision (Split)	5	3:00	For the ONE Flyweight Muay Thai World Championship
Featherweight 70 kg	(Italy) Giorgio Petrosyan	def.	(France) Samy Sana	Decision (Unanimous)	3	3:00	Kickboxing Featherweight Grand-Prix Final
Lightweight 77 kg	(Japan) Shinya Aoki	def.	(Philippines) Honorio Banario	Submission (D'Arce choke)	1	0:54	
Heavyweight 120 kg	(India) Arjan Bhullar	def.	(Italy) Mauro Cerilli	Decision (Unanimous)	3	5:00	
Preliminary Card
Atomweight 52 kg	(Japan) Mei Yamaguchi	def.	(Taiwan) Jenny Huang	Decision (Unanimous)	3	5:00	
Strawweight 57 kg	(Japan) Yosuke Saruta	def.	(Japan) Daichi Kitakata	KO (Punches)	2	0:59	Pancrase vs. Shooto
Flyweight 61 kg	(Japan) Shoko Sato	def.	(Brazil) Rafael Silva	TKO (Punches)	2	4:30	Pancrase vs. Shooto
Lightweight 77 kg	(Japan) Hiroyuki Tetsuka	def.	(Brazil) Hernani Perpetuo	Decision (Unanimous)	3	5:00	Pancrase vs. Shooto
Featherweight 70 kg	(Japan) Takasuke Kume	def.	(Japan) Koshi Matsumoto	Decision (Unanimous)	3	5:00	Pancrase vs. Shooto

== ONE Championship: Dawn Of Valor ==
ONE Championship: Dawn Of Valor
- Promotion: ONE Championship
- Date: October 25, 2019
- Venue: Istora Senayan
- City: Jakarta, Indonesia

ONE Championship: Dawn Of Valor (also known as ONE Championship 101) was a combat sport event held by ONE Championship on October 25, 2019, at the Istora Senayan in Jakarta, Indonesia.

=== Background ===
A middleweight bout between Leandro Ataides and Vitaly Bigdash was previously scheduled for the main card. However, Bigdash has been forced to pull out of the fight when he has suffered a staph infection and the bout was scrapped.

=== Results ===
ONE: Dawn Of Valor
Weight Class				Method	Round	Time	Notes
Welterweight 84 kg	(Kyrgyzstan) Kiamrian Abbasov	def.	(Sweden) Zebaztian Kadestam (c)	Decision (Unanimous)	5	5:00	For the ONE Welterweight World Championship
Lightweight 77 kg	(Suriname) Regian Eersel (c)	def.	(Netherlands) Nieky Holzken	Decision (Unanimous)	5	3:00	For the ONE Lightweight Kickboxing World Championship
Atomweight 52 kg	(Indonesia) Priscilla Gaol	def.	(Myanmar) Bozhena Antoniyar	Decision (Unanimous)	3	5:00	
Strawweight 57 kg	(China) Wang Junguang	def.	(Argentina) Federico Roma	TKO (Punches)	1	2:59	Kickboxing
Bantamweight 66 kg	(Brazil) John Lineker	def.	(Tajikistan) Muin Gafurov	Decision (Unanimous)	3	5:00	
Bantamweight 66 kg	(New Zealand) Mark Abelardo	def.	(China) Ayideng Jumayi	Decision (Unanimous)	3	5:00	
Flyweight 61 kg	(Indonesia) Eko Roni Saputra	def.	(Philippines) Kaji Ebin	TKO (Shoulder Injury)	1	0:19	
Preliminary Card
Strawweight 57 kg	(Indonesia) Stefer Rahardian	def.	(Indonesia) Adrian Mattheis	Decision (Unanimous)	3	5:00	
Lightweight 77 kg	(Netherlands) Pieter Buist	def.	(Australia) Antonio Caruso	Decision (Unanimous)	3	5:00	
Flyweight 61 kg	(Indonesia) Abro Fernandes	def.	(Indonesia) Rudy Agustian	Decision (Unanimous)	3	5:00	
Lightweight 77 kg	(Japan) Kazuki Tokudome	def.	(United States) Johnny Nunez	Decision (Unanimous)	3	5:00	
Strawweight 57 kg	(Indonesia) Elipitua Siregar	def.	(Indonesia) Egi Rozten	Submission (Rear-Naked Choke)	1	2:00	
Flyweight 61 kg	(Japan) Taiki Naito	def.	(New Zealand) Alexi Serepisos	TKO (Punches)	3	2:45	Muay Thai
Strawweight 57 kg	(Indonesia) Adi Paryanto	def.	(Indonesia) Angelo Bimoadji	TKO (Knees)	1	1:04	

== ONE Hero Series October ==
ONE Hero Series October
- Promotion: ONE Championship
- Date: October 28, 2019
- City: Beijing, China

ONE Hero Series October was a combat sport event held by ONE Championship on October 28, 2019, in Beijing, China.

=== Results ===
ONE Hero Series October
Weight Class				Method	Round	Time	Notes
Strawweight 57 kg	(China) Ze Lang Zha Xi	def.	(China) Li Zhe	Submission (Guillotine Choke)	1	4:14	
Lightweight 77 kg	(China) Bo Fu Fan	def.	(China) Zhao Jun Chen	KO (Punch)	2	1:22	Kickboxing
Lightweight 77 kg	(Russia) Aziz Pahrudino	def.	(Russia) Kharun Atlangariev	Submission (Triangle Choke)	1	1:11	
Flyweight 61 kg	(China) Bu Huo You Ga	def.	(China) Fan Jia Le	Decision (Unanimous)	3	5:00	
Flyweight 61 kg	(China) Zhao Zhan Shi	def.	(China) Yang Hua	Decision (Split)	3	5:00	Kickboxing
Lightweight 77 kg	(Nigeria) Anthony Njokuani	def.	(Australia) Elliot Compton	Decision (Unanimous)	3	5:00	Muay Thai
Lightweight 77 kg	(China) Yuan yi	def.	(China) Chang Shuai	Submission (Triangle Armbar)	1	1:38	
Strawweight 57 kg	(China) Li Hong Lin	def.	(China) Cai Xiong Xiong	Submission (Rear Naked Choke)	2	2:22	
Featherweight 70 kg	(China) Lu Rui Lei	def.	(China) Shang Xi Feng	Decision (Unanimous)	3	5:00	Kickboxing
Bantamweight 66 kg	(China) Liu Meng Yu	def.	(China) Xu Yan Wei	Decision (Unanimous)	3	5:00	
Strawweight 57 kg	(China) Wang Jian Hong	def.	(China) Sha Nidu	Submission (D'arce Choke)	2	1:48	

== ONE Championship: Masters Of Fate ==
ONE Championship: Masters Of Fate
- Promotion: ONE Championship
- Date: November 8, 2019
- Venue: Mall of Asia Arena
- City: Pasay, Philippines

ONE Championship: Masters Of Fate (also known as ONE Championship 102) was a combat sport event held by ONE Championship on November 8, 2019, at the Mall of Asia Arena in Pasay, Philippines.

=== Background ===
Emilio Urrutia has been forced to withdraw from his scheduled fight against Jae Woong Kim due to undisclosed reasons. Kim instead faced the Brazilian Rafael Nunes, who stepped in on short notice for this encounter.

Alma Juniku was scheduled to face Anne Line Hogstad in the main card, but Juniku suffered an injury in training and withdrew from the fight. The bout was scrapped.

=== Results ===
ONE: Masters Of Fate
Weight Class				Method	Round	Time	Notes
Strawweight 57 kg	(Philippines) Joshua Pacio (c)	def.	(Philippines) Rene Catalan	Submission (Arm-Triangle Choke)	2	2:29	For the ONE Strawweight World Championship
Lightweight 77 kg	(Philippines) Eduard Folayang	def.	(Mongolia) Amarsanaa Tsogookhuu	Decision (Technical)	2	2:31	The fight was stopped prematurely due to a cut by an unintentional head butt by Tsogookhuu.
Bantamweight 66 kg	(Thailand) Sangmanee Sor Tienpo	def.	(France) Azize Hlali	Decision (Unanimous)	3	3:00	Muay Thai
Flyweight 61 kg	(Philippines) Geje Eustaquio	def.	(Finland) Toni Tauru	KO (Spinning Back Kick)	3	2:11	
W. Atomweight 52 kg	(Thailand) Stamp Fairtex	def.	(Vietnam) Bi Nguyen	Decision (Unanimous)	3	5:00	
Bantamweight 66 kg	(China) Li Kai Wen	def.	(Indonesia) Paul Lumihi	KO (Punches)	1	2:39	
Preliminary Card
Strawweight 57 kg	(Japan) Yoshitaka Naito	def.	(Thailand) Pongsiri Mitsatit	Decision (Unanimous)	3	5:00	
Bantamweight 66 kg	(Thailand) Kongsak P.K.Saenchaimuaythaigym	def.	(China) Han Zi Hao	Decision (Unanimous)	3	3:00	Muay Thai
Strawweight 57 kg	(Philippines) Robin Catalan	def.	(Cuba) Gustavo Balart	KO (Head Kick)	2	4:43	
Bantamweight 66 kg	(Thailand) Tukkatatong Petpayathai	def.	(Japan) Hiroaki Suzuki	Decision (Split)	3	3:00	Muay Thai
Featherweight 70 kg	(South Korea) Jae Woong Kim	def.	(Brazil) Rafael Nunes	TKO (Body Punch and Knees)	3	0:38	
Flyweight 61 kg	(South Korea) Kim Kyu Sung	def.	(Japan) Akihiro Fujisawa	KO (Punches)	1	1:08	
Flyweight 61 kg	(India) Roshan Mainam	def.	(Cambodia) Khon Sichan	Submission (Americana)	1	3:22	

== ONE Championship: Age Of Dragons ==
ONE Championship: Age Of Dragons
- Promotion: ONE Championship
- Date: November 16, 2019
- Venue: Cadillac Arena
- City: Beijing, China

ONE Championship: Age Of Dragons (also known as ONE Championship 103) was a combat sport event held by ONE Championship on November 16, 2019, at the Cadillac Arena in Beijing, China.

=== Background ===
Sasha Moisa has been forced to withdraw from his scheduled fight against Yodsanklai Fairtex due to undisclosed reasons. Yodsaenklai instead faced Jamal Yusupov, who stepped in on short notice for this encounter.

Cindy Tiong has been forced to withdraw from his scheduled fight against Ritu Phogat due to undisclosed reasons. Nam-Hee Kim served as Tiong replacement, takes short notice fight against Phogat.

=== Results ===
ONE: Age Of Dragons
Weight Class				Method	Round	Time	Notes
Flyweight 61 kg	(Netherlands) Ilias Ennahachi (c)	def.	(China) Wang Wenfeng	Decision (Split Criteria)	5	3:00	For the ONE Flyweight Kickboxing World Championship
Light Heavyweight 102 kg	(Ukraine) Roman Kryklia	def.	(Morocco) Tarik Khbabez	TKO (Punches)	2	0:43	For the inaugural ONE Light Heavyweight Kickboxing World Championship
Catchweight 73 kg	(Russia) Jamal Yusupov	def.	(Thailand) Yodsanklai Fairtex	KO (Punches)	2	0:39	Muay Thai
W. Atomweight 52 kg	(China) Meng Bo	def.	(Argentina) Laura Balin	KO (Punches)	1	2:18	
W. Atomweight 52 kg	(India) Ritu Phogat	def.	(South Korea) Nam-Hee Kim	TKO (Punches)	1	3:37	
Strawweight 57 kg	(Philippines) Jeremy Miado	def.	(China) Miao Li Tao	KO (Flying Knee)	1	3:01	
Preliminary Card
W. Featherweight 70 kg	(Germany) Christina Breuer	def.	(Netherlands) Jorina Baars	Decision (Split Criteria)	3	3:00	Kickboxing
Featherweight 70 kg	(China) Tang Kai	def.	(Philippines) Edward Kelly	Decision (Unanimous)	3	5:00	
Bantamweight 66 kg	(Russia) Yusup Saadulaev	def.	(Japan) Daichi Takenaka	Decision (Split)	3	5:00	
Catchweight 73 kg	(Germany) Enriko Kehl	def.	(Armenia) Armen Petrosyan	TKO (Retirement)	2	1:55	Kickboxing
Strawweight 57 kg	(China) Hexigetu	def.	(Philippines) Ramon Gonzales	Decision (Unanimous)	3	5:00	

== ONE Hero Series November ==
ONE Hero Series November
- Promotion: ONE Championship
- Date: November 18, 2019
- City: Beijing, China

ONE Hero Series November was a combat sport event held by ONE Championship on November 18, 2019, in Beijing, China.

=== Results ===
ONE Hero Series November
Weight Class				Method	Round	Time	Notes
Bantamweight 66 kg	(China) Fu Qing Nan	def.	(China) Xie Yu Hang	Decision (Unanimous)	3	5:00	Kickboxing
Flyweight 61 kg	(China) Hu Yong	def.	(China) Wang Zhen	Decision (Unanimous)	3	5:00	
Featherweight 70 kg	(China) Luo Chao	def.	(China) Liu Gui Cheng	TKO (3 knockdowns)	1		Kickboxing
Catchweight 63 kg	(China) Zhang Tao	def.	(China) Zhao Bo Shi	Decision (Unanimous)	3	5:00	Kickboxing
Catchweight 62.6 kg	(China) Yang Fu Chong	def.	(China) Gui Yan Zhao	KO (Body Knee)	2	2:10	
Flyweight 61 kg	(China) Mo Yong Hui	def.	(China) Wang Jia Le	Decision (Unanimous)	3	5:00	Muay Thai
Catchweight 72 kg	(China) Yi De Ri Gun	def.	(China) Wang Shi Qi	TKO (Punches)	3	2:27	
Catchweight 58 kg	(China) Yan Zhi Yuan	def.	(China) A Xi Shi Ga	Submission (Rear Naked Choke)	3	5:00	
Strawweight 57 kg	(China) Wei Zi Qin	def.	(China) Liu Yao Hong	TKO (Doctor Stoppage, cut)	3	4:17	Muay Thai
Flyweight 61 kg	(China) Wang Hu	def.	(China) Li Hong Jiang	Decision (Unanimous)	3	5:00	
Strawweight 57 kg	(China) Bian Ye	def.	(China) Yang Ying Giang	Decision (Unanimous)	3	5:00	

== ONE Championship: Edge Of Greatness ==
ONE Championship: Edge Of Greatness
- Promotion: ONE Championship
- Date: November 22, 2019
- Venue: Singapore Indoor Stadium
- City: Kallang, Singapore

ONE Championship: Edge Of Greatness (also known as ONE Championship 104) was a combat sport event held by ONE Championship on November 22, 2019, at the Singapore Indoor Stadium in Kallang, Singapore.

=== Background ===
A bout between Tiffany Teo and Maira Mazar was cancelled a week before the event due to an eye injury, Teo was not medically cleared to fight.

Rahul Raju was expected to face Ahmed Mujtaba, but visa issues forced Mujtaba out of the fight. Furkan Cheema has stepped in on short notice against Raju. They both missed weight for their lightweight fight, the bout was held at 80 kg catchweight.

=== Results ===
ONE: Edge Of Greatness
Weight Class				Method	Round	Time	Notes
Bantamweight 66 kg	(Thailand) Nong-O Gaiyanghadao (c)	def.	(Thailand) Saemapetch Fairtex	KO (Punch)	4	1:46	For the ONE Bantamweight Muay Thai World Championship
Lightweight 77 kg	(Singapore) Amir Khan	def.	(Malaysia) Ev Ting	Decision (Split)	3	5:00	
Catchweight 68.5 kg	(United States) Troy Worthen	def.	(China) Chen Lei	TKO (Punches)	2	4:56	
Catchweight 80 kg	(India) Rahul Raju	def.	(Pakistan) Furkan Cheema	Submission (Rear-Naked Choke)	2	3:00	
Strawweight 57 kg	(Thailand) Dejdamrong Sor Amnuaysirichoke	def.	(Pakistan) Muhammad Imran	TKO (Knees and Punches)	3	1:21	
W. Flyweight 61 kg	(United States) Colbey Northcutt	def.	(Indonesia) Putri Padmi	Decision (Unanimous)	3	5:00	
Strawweight 57 kg	(Brazil) Alex Silva	def.	(China) Peng Xue Wen	Submission (Armbar)	2	4:45	
Preliminary Card
Featherweight 70 kg	(Thailand) Phetmorakot Petchyindee Academy	def.	(England) Charlie Peters	KO (Knee to the Body)	2	1:48	Muay Thai
Flyweight 61 kg	(Vietnam) Nguyễn Trần Duy Nhất	def.	(Japan) Yuta Watanabe	KO (Head Kick)	2	0:30	Muay Thai
Bantamweight 66 kg	(Japan) Shuya Kamikubo	def.	(Brazil) Bruno Pucci	Decision (Unanimous)	5	3:00	
Featherweight 70 kg	(England) Liam Nolan	def.	(Netherlands) Brown Pinas	Decision (Unanimous)	3	3:00	Muay Thai

== ONE Warrior Series 9 ==
ONE Warrior Series 9
- Promotion: ONE Championship
- Date: December 4, 2019
- City: Kallang, Singapore

ONE Warrior Series 9 was a combat sport event held by ONE Championship on December 4, 2019, in Kallang, Singapore.

=== Results ===
ONE Warriors Series 9
Weight Class				Method	Round	Time	Notes
Flyweight 61 kg	(China) Xie Wei	def.	(Philippines) Rockie Bactol	TKO (Knee and Punches)	1	0:46	
Welterweight 84 kg	(Brazil) Carlos Prates	def.	(Australia) Joseph Luciano	Decision (Unanimous)	3	5:00	
Bantamweight 66 kg	(Iran) Ali Motamed	def.	(Japan) Hikaru Yoshino	Decision (Split)	3	5:00	
Flyweight 61 kg	(South Korea) Joo-Hwan Kim	def.	(Thailand) Saharat Khongsawat	TKO (Punches)	2	1:20	
W. Atomweight 52 kg	(South Korea) Ji-Yeon Seo	def.	(Philippines) Rocel Catalan	TKO (Punches)	1	1:21	
Featherweight 70 kg	(Singapore) Ashraf Fauzi	def.	(South Korea) Yung-Jun Kim	DQ (Illegal Spike)	1	1:47	
W. Atomweight 52 kg	(Brazil) Michele Ferreira	def.	(New Zealand) Nyrene Crowley	Submission (Armbar)	1	2:21	
Catchweight 98 kg	(Mongolia) Ganbayar Tumurkhuyag	def.	(Indonesia) Vincent Majid	TKO (Knees and Punches)	2	4:51	
Flyweight 61 kg	(Vietnam) Viet Anh Do	def.	(India) Govind Singh	KO (Head Kick and Punches)	1	2:51	
W. Atomweight 52 kg	(Australia) Kristy Obst	def.	(Vietnam) Uyen Ha	TKO (Punches)	1	2:39	
Flyweight 61 kg	(South Korea) Chang-Ho Lee	def.	(Brazil) Micael de Jesus	TKO (Punches)	3	2:28	
Flyweight 61 kg	(Mongolia) Purev Otgonjargal	def.	(South Korea) Tae-Ho Bak	Submission (D'arce Choke)	3	3:43	
Flyweight 61 kg	(Pakistan) Ovais Shah	-	(Bangladesh) Asraful Islam	No Contest (Accidental Low Blow)	2	0:31	
Catchweight 58.5 kg	(Indonesia) Toreq	def.	(Philippines) Allan Albindo	Decision (Split)	3	5:00	

== ONE Championship: Mark Of Greatness ==
ONE Championship: Mark Of Greatness
- Promotion: ONE Championship
- Date: December 6, 2019
- Venue: Axiata Arena
- City: Kuala Lumpur, Malaysia

ONE Championship: Mark Of Greatness (also known as ONE Championship 105) was a combat sport event held by ONE Championship on December 6, 2019, at the Axiata Arena in Kuala Lumpur, Malaysia.

=== Background ===
Fabio Pinca was scheduled to face Chang-Min Yoon in the main card, but Pinca suffered an injury in training and withdrew from the fight. Rodian Menchaves served as Pinca replacement, takes short notice fight against Yoon. The bout was held at 72 kg catchweight.

Mohammad Karaki had suffered an injury and was pulling out of his bout with Agilan Thani. Karaki was replaced by former LFA veteran Dante Schiro.

=== Results ===
ONE: Mark Of Greatness
Weight Class				Method	Round	Time	Notes
Strawweight 57 kg	(Thailand) Sam-A Gaiyanghadao	def.	(China) Wang Junguang	Decision (Unanimous)	5	3:00	For the inaugural ONE Strawweight Kickboxing World Championship
Bantamweight 66 kg	(Russia) Alaverdi Ramazanov	def.	(China) Zhang Chenglong	Decision (Unanimous)	5	3:00	For the inaugural ONE Bantamweight Kickboxing World Championship
W. Atomweight 52 kg	(Philippines) Denice Zamboanga	def.	(Malaysia) Jihin Radzuan	Decision (Unanimous)	3	5:00	
Welterweight 84 kg	(Malaysia) Agilan Thani	def.	(United States) Dante Schiro	Decision (Split)	3	5:00	
Flyweight 61 kg	(Australia) Reece McLaren	def.	(Canada) Gurdarshan Mangat	Submission (Rear-Naked Choke)	1	4:35	
Light Heavyweight 102 kg	(Romania) Andrei Stoica	def.	(Brazil) Anderson Silva	TKO (Punches)	1	1:57	Kickboxing
Strawweight 57 kg	(South Africa) Bokang Masunyane	def.	(Japan) Ryuto Sawada	Decision (Unanimous)	3	5:00	
Preliminary Card
Flyweight 61 kg	(Algeria) Elias Mahmoudi	def.	(Thailand) Lerdsila Chumpairtour	Decision (Unanimous)	3	3:00	Muay Thai
Bantamweight 66 kg	(China) Chen Rui	def.	(Malaysia) Muhammad Aiman	Decision (Unanimous)	3	5:00	
Bantamweight 66 kg	(Myanmar) Tial Thang	def.	(South Korea) Woon-Kyoum Kim	Decision (Unanimous)	3	5:00	
Catchweight 72 kg	(South Korea) Chang-Min Yoon	def.	(Philippines) Rodian Menchaves	Submission (Ninja Choke)	2	1:45	
Flyweight 61 kg	(Japan) Taiki Naito	def.	(Portugal) Rui Botelho	Decision (Unanimous)	3	3:00	Muay Thai
W. Flyweight 61 kg	(Brazil) Rayane Bastos	def.	(United States) Sovannahry Em	Submission (Guillotine Choke)	1	2:40	

== ONE Hero Series December ==
ONE Hero Series December
- Promotion: ONE Championship
- Date: December 16, 2019
- City: Beijing, China

ONE Hero Series December was a combat sport event held by ONE Championship on December 16, 2019, in Beijing, China.

=== Results ===
ONE Hero Series December
Weight Class				Method	Round	Time	Notes
Flyweight 61 kg	(China) Zhao Boshi	def.	(China) Huang Shuailu	Decision (Unanimous)	3	5:00	Kickboxing
Strawweight 57 kg	(China) Ze Lang Zha Xi	def.	(China) Bu Huo You Ga	Decision (Unanimous)	3	5:00	
Flyweight 61 kg	(China) Wei Zi Qin	def.	(China) Wang Jia Le	TKO (Retirement)	2	5:00	Muay Thai
Lightweight 77 kg	(China) Zhang Ze Hao	def.	(China) Ayiken Wusaierbabai	TKO (Ground & Pound)	3	4:13	
Featherweight 70 kg	(China) Akenbieke Ayijiake	def.	(China) Luo Zhou Jiang Cuo	Decision (Unanimous)	3	5:00	
Featherweight 70 kg	(China) Ren Ya Wei	def.	(China) Shang Xi Feng	KO (Punch)	3	2:00	Kickboxing
Catchweight 63 kg	(China) Xia Lian Yang	def.	(China) Xia Ming Quan	Decision (Unanimous)	3	5:00	
Flyweight 61 kg	(China) Yan Zhi Yuan	def.	(China) Xia Ming Quan	Decision (Unanimous)	3	5:00	Kickboxing
Bantamweight 66 kg	(China) Xu Yan Wei	def.	(China) Xie Xiao Hong	TKO (Ground & Pound)	3	3:53	
Flyweight 61 kg	(China) Meng Ketuogesi	def.	(China) Zou Jin Bo	Decision (Unanimous)	3	5:00	
Strawweight 57 kg	(China) Mo Hao Xiong	def.	(China) Cai Xiong Xiong	Decision (Unanimous)	3	5:00	

== See also ==
- 2019 in UFC
- Bellator MMA in 2019
- 2019 in Rizin Fighting Federation
- 2019 in Absolute Championship Akhmat
- 2019 in M-1 Global
- 2020 in Fight Nights Global
- 2019 in Konfrontacja Sztuk Walki
- 2019 in Road FC
- 2019 in Glory
- 2019 in Kunlun Fight
- 2019 in Romanian kickboxing
