= Alaverdi Ramazanov =

Russian Muay Thai kickboxer

- Born: 29 November 1994 (age 31); Kizlyar, Dagestan, Russia
- Native name: Алаверди Рамазанов
- Other names: Babyface Killer, Dagger
- Nationality: Russian
- Height: 180 cm (5 ft 11 in)
- Weight: 65.8 kg (145 lb; 10.36 st)
- Division: Bantamweight (145 lbs) (ONE)
- Style: Muay Thai, Kickboxing
- Fighting out of: Russia
- Team: Venum Training Camp Thailand
- Trainer: Mehdi Zatout
- Years active: 2012–present

Kickboxing record
- Total: 27
- Wins: 15
- By knockout: 7
- Losses: 12
- By knockout: 4
- Draws: 0

Alaverdi Ramazanov (Russian: Алаверди Рамазанов; born November 29, 1994) is a Russian Muay Thai kickboxer who is currently signed to ONE Championship. He is the former and inaugural ONE Bantamweight Kickboxing World Champion. Ramazanov is also a former 3-time IFMA Muay Thai World Champion and 12-time Russian national Muay Thai champion.

== Background ==
Growing up in Dagestan, Ramazanov initially participated in competitive swimming. However, at the age of 13, he turned his attention to Muay Thai.

== Muay Thai career ==
Alaverdi Ramazanov made his Muay Thai debut at the age of 18. He moved to Thailand at 21 to train with the Venum Training Camp in order to develop his Muay Thai skills.

=== ONE Championship ===
==== Early ONE career ====
Ramazanov made his ONE debut at ONE Championship: Kingdom of Heroes on October 6, 2018 against the heavily favored Phetmorakot Petchyindee Academy. Despite receiving a cut on the back of his head, Ramazanov outstruck Phetmorakot and fought on to claim the unanimous decision victory.

He then faced Andrew Miller at ONE Championship: Heart of the Lion on November 9, 2018. Ramazanov made quick work of the Scotsman with a 57-second, first-round knockout. Ramazanov's KO of Miller stood as a ONE Super Series record for fastest knockout until Kohei "Momotaro" Kodera's 41-second knockout of Singtongnoi Por.Telakun at ONE Championship: Immortal Triumph on September 6, 2019.

Only two weeks later, Ramazanov stepped in on short notice to face Saemapetch Fairtex at ONE Championship: Conquest of Champions on November 23, 2018. Despite keeping the fight close and competitive, Ramazanov lost the fight by unanimous decision.

On February 16, 2019, Alaverdi Ramazanov faced Kongsak P.K. SaenchaiMuaythaiGym at ONE Championship: Clash of Legends. Once again, Ramazanov was able to keep the fight close but ultimately lost via split decision.

Nevertheless, Ramazanov would bounce back as he faced Serbian-American veteran Ognjen Topic at ONE Championship: Dreams of Gold on August 16, 2019. Ramazanov came out strong and was able to knock down Topic three times within the first round, claiming the decisive TKO victory.

==== ONE Bantamweight title reign ====
His win over Ognjen Topic would set him up for a title shot against Zhang Chenglong for the inaugural ONE Bantamweight Kickboxing World Championship at ONE Championship: Mark Of Greatness on December 6, 2019. Despite having mostly fought under Muay Thai rules and showing signs of slowing down in the later rounds, Alaverdi Ramazanov was able to adapt and scored a crucial knockdown before winning the fight by unanimous decision, becoming the first ONE Bantamweight Kickboxing World Champion.

Alaverdi Ramazanov was scheduled to defend his ONE Bantamweight Kickboxing World title against the reigning ONE Bantamweight Muay Thai World Champion Nong-O Gaiyanghadao at ONE Championship: Heart of Heroes on March 20, 2020. He had previously expressed interest in a fight with Nong-O. However, their fight never materialized and the event was cancelled as a result of the COVID-19 pandemic.

Ramazanov was scheduled to make his first title defense against Capitan Petchyindee Academy at ONE Championship: Unbreakable. On January 22, 2021, Ramazanov lost the title to Capitan by second-round knockout via leg kicks.

==== Post-title reign ====
Ramazanov is scheduled to return against former ONE Featherweight Muay Thai title challenger Pongsiri P.K.Saenchaimuaythaigym at ONE Championship: NextGen III on November 26, 2021. He won the fight by split decision.

Ramazanov faced Capitan Petchyindee Academy in a rematch at ONE 161 on September 29, 2022. He won the close bout via split decision.

Ramazanov was scheduled to face Nong-O Gaiyanghadao for the ONE Bantamweight Muay Thai World Championship on January 14, 2023, at ONE Fight Night 6. However, the bout was moved to headline at ONE Friday Fights 1 on January 20. He lost the bout via knockout in the third round.

Ramazanov faced Mavlud Tupiev on March 10, 2023, at ONE Friday Fights 8. He lost the fight via unanimous decision.

Ramazanov then faced Alessandro Sara at ONE Friday Fights 31 on September 1, 2023. He won the bout via first-round knockout.

Ramazanov was issued a six-month suspension from ONE Championship, along with his coach Mehdi Zatout, due to his altercation with the two-sport World Champion Jonathan Haggerty at ONE Fight Night 16 on November 4, 2023 in Bangkok, Thailand.

== Titles and accomplishments ==
- ONE Championship
  - ONE Bantamweight Kickboxing World Champion (one time; former)
- International Federation of Muaythai Amateur
  - 2011 IFMA European Championships Junior -42 kg (gold)
  - IFMA Muay Thai World Champion
  - IFMA Muay Thai European Champion
- Russian Muaythai Federation
  - 12× Russian National (Russian Muaythai Federation) Muay Thai Champion

Awards

- 2019 Orion Awards Fighter of the Year

== Fight record ==
Muay Thai Record
15 Wins (7 (T)KOs), 12 Losses, 0 Draws
Date	Result	Opponent	Event	Location	Method	Round	Time
2025-11-21	Loss	(France) Elies Abdelali	ONE Friday Fights 134, Lumpinee Stadium	Bangkok, Thailand	TKO (broken leg)	1	0:29
2025-09-12	Win	(Thailand) Dernchon Lukjaomaesaithong	ONE Friday Fights 124, Lumpinee Stadium	Bangkok, Thailand	KO (Right cross)	1	3:00
2024-06-28	Loss	(Thailand) Petchtanong Petchfergus	ONE Friday Fights 68, Lumpinee Stadium	Bangkok, Thailand	TKO (retirement)	2	1:59
2023-09-01	Win	(Italy) Alessandro Sara	ONE Friday Fights 31, Lumpinee Stadium	Bangkok, Thailand	KO (Elbow)	1	1:39
2023-03-10	Loss	(Uzbekistan) Mavlud Tupiev	ONE Friday Fights 8, Lumpinee Stadium	Bangkok, Thailand	Decision (Unanimous)	3	3:00
2023-01-20	Loss	(Thailand) Nong-O Gaiyanghadao	ONE Friday Fights 1, Lumpinee Stadium	Bangkok, Thailand	KO (Body punch)	3	2:12
For the ONE Bantamweight Muay Thai World Championship.
2022-09-29	Win	(Thailand) Capitan Petchyindee Academy	ONE 161	Kallang, Singapore	Decision (Split)	3	3:00
2021-11-26	Win	(Thailand) Pongsiri P.K.Saenchaimuaythaigym	ONE Championship: NextGen III	Kallang, Singapore	KO (Punch)	1	2:39
2021-01-22	Loss	(Thailand) Capitan Petchyindee Academy	ONE Championship: Unbreakable	Kallang, Singapore	KO (Leg kick + right cross)	2	1:56
Lost the ONE Bantamweight Kickboxing World Championship.
2019-12-06	Win	(China) Zhang Chenglong	ONE Championship: Mark Of Greatness	Kuala Lumpur, Malaysia	Decision (Unanimous)	5	3:00
Wins the inaugural ONE Bantamweight Kickboxing World Championship.
2019-08-16	Win	(United States) Ognjen Topic	ONE Championship: Dreams of Gold	Bangkok, Thailand	TKO (3 Knockdown Rule)	1	2:25
2019-02-16	Loss	(Thailand) Kongsak P.K. SaenchaiMuaythaiGym	ONE Championship: Clash of Legends	Bangkok, Thailand	Decision (Split)	3	3:00
2018-11-23	Loss	(Thailand) Saemapetch Fairtex	ONE Championship: Conquest of Champions	Pasay, Philippines	Decision (Unanimous)	3	3:00
2018-11-09	Win	(Scotland) Andrew Miller	ONE Championship: Heart of the Lion	Kallang, Singapore	TKO (Punches)	1	0:57
2018-10-06	Win	(Thailand) Phetmorakot Wor. Sangprapai	ONE Championship: Kingdom of Heroes	Bangkok, Thailand	Decision (Unanimous)	3	3:00
2018-05-06	Loss	(Thailand) Jarwdjew Singnakonkui	Real Hero Tournament, Quarter Finals	Bangkok, Thailand	Decision	3	3:00
2018-04-08	Loss	(France) Celestin Mendes	Duel 3	Paris, France	Decision	5	3:00
2018-01-28	Loss	(Thailand) Beerthai Por Yuttapoom	MAX Muay Thai	Pattaya, Thailand	Decision	3	3:00
2017-12-16	Win	(France) Islem Hamech	La Nuit Des Challenges 17	France	Decision	5	3:00
2017-12-03	Win	(Thailand) Tungngern Aot Bor Tor Tasala	MAX Muay Thai	Pattaya, Thailand	KO	3	
2017-10-28	Win	(France) Aiman Al Radhi	Duel 2	Paris, France	Decision	3	3:00
2017-05-18	Win	(France) Kamal Aousti	Boxing Event	Sarcelles, France	Decision	3	3:00
2017-03-01	Win	(Thailand) Praganchai	MC Fight	Thailand	KO	1	
2016-05-08	Win	(Thailand) Wuttichai Sor Jor Piaktapong	MAX Muay Thai	Pattaya, Thailand	Decision	3	3:00
2016-04-17	Win	(Thailand) Jimmy Sitmonchai	MAX Muay Thai	Pattaya, Thailand	Decision	3	3:00
2016-02-16	Loss	(Republic of Ireland) Jodan	Lumpinee Stadium	Bangkok, Thailand	Decision	5	3:00
2015-12-26	Loss	(Laos) Somboun Vongsa	Super Muaythai	Bangkok, Thailand	Decision	3	3:00
Legend: Win Loss Draw/No contest Notes

== See also ==
- List of male kickboxers
