= W.A.K.O. World Championships 2001 =

W.A.K.O. World Championships 2001 may refer to:

- W.A.K.O. World Championships 2001 (Belgrade)
- W.A.K.O. World Championships 2001 (Maribor)
