= Men's Low-Kick at W.A.K.O. European Championships 2006 Skopje +91 kg =

Men's Low-Kick Kickboxing at the W.A.K.O. European Championships 2006 (Skopje)
-51 kg
-54 kg
-57 kg
-60 kg
-63.5 kg
-67 kg
-71 kg
-75 kg
-81 kg
-86 kg
-91 kg
+91 kg

The men's super heavyweight (+91 kg/200.2 lb) Low-Kick division at the W.A.K.O. European Championships 2006 in Skopje was the heaviest of the male Low-Kick tournaments and involved seven fighters. Each of the matches was three rounds of two minutes each and were fought under Low-Kick kickboxing rules.

As there were not enough participants for a tournament designed for eight, one of the men had a bye through to the semi-finals. The tournament champion was Dragan Jovanović from Serbia, who won gold by defeating Azerbaijani Hafiz Bakhshaliyev in the final by unanimous decision. Defeated semi finalists Goran Radonic from Montenegro and Jan Antoska from Slovakia won bronze.

== Results ==
Quarter-finals
(Bosnia and Herzegovina) Ujkan Todic
(Slovakia) Jan Antoska	D(2:1)
(Azerbaijan) Hafiz Bakhshaliyev	D(3:0)
(Croatia) Marin Dosen
(Montenegro) Goran Radonjic	D(3:0)
(Bosnia and Herzegovina) Sanid Imamovic

Semi-finals
(Slovakia) Jan Antoska
(Azerbaijan) Hafiz Bakhshaliyev	D(2:1)
(Montenegro) Goran Radonjic
(Serbia) Dragan Jovanović	D(2:1)

Final
(Azerbaijan) Hafiz Bakhshaliyev
(Serbia) Dragan Jovanović	D(3:0)

=== Key ===
Abbreviation	Meaning
D (2:1)	Decision (Winners Score:Losers Score)
KO	Knockout
TKO	Technical Knockout
AB	Abandonment (Injury in match)
WO	Walkover (No fight)
DQ	Disqualification

== See also ==
- List of WAKO Amateur European Championships
- List of WAKO Amateur World Championships
- List of male kickboxers
