= Men's Low-Kick at W.A.K.O. European Championships 2006 Skopje -60 kg =

Men's Low-Kick Kickboxing at the W.A.K.O. European Championships 2006 (Skopje)
-51 kg
-54 kg
-57 kg
-60 kg
-63.5 kg
-67 kg
-71 kg
-75 kg
-81 kg
-86 kg
-91 kg
+91 kg

The men's lightweight (60 kg/118.8 lbs) Low-Kick division at the W.A.K.O. European Championships 2006 in Skopje was the fourth lightest of the male Low-Kick tournaments and involved eleven fighters. Each of the matches was three rounds of two minutes each and were fought under Low-Kick kickboxing rules.

As there were too few participants for a tournament of sixteen, five of the men had byes through to the quarter-final stage. Eduard Mammadov from Azerbaijan won gold after having made the final in Agadir the previous year, beating Dzianis Tselitsa from Belarus by unanimous decision. Defeated semi finalists Russian's Alikhan Chumaev and Grigory Gorokhov both won bronze.

== Results ==
1st round
(North Macedonia) Burim Selimi
(Russia) Grigory Gorokhov	D(3:0)
(Poland) Lukasz Plainecki
(Belarus) Dzianis Tselitsa	D(3:0)
(Bosnia and Herzegovina) Sinisa Gambeljic	D(3:0)
(Sweden) Jonas Ivung

Quarter-finals
(Serbia) Mihajlo Jovanovic
(Russia) Grigory Gorokhov	D(3:0)
(Italy) Massimiliano Solinas
(Belarus) Dzianis Tselitsa	D(3:0)
(Russia) Alikhan Chumaev	WO
(North Macedonia) Marjan Kuzmanovski
(Bosnia and Herzegovina) Sinisa Gambeljic
(Azerbaijan) Eduard Mammadov	D(3:0)

Semi-finals
(Russia) Grigory Gorokhov
(Belarus) Dzianis Tselitsa	D(3:0)
(Russia) Alikhan Chumaev
(Azerbaijan) Eduard Mammadov	D(3:0)

Final
(Belarus) Dzianis Tselitsa
(Azerbaijan) Eduard Mammadov	D(3:0)

=== Key ===
Abbreviation	Meaning
D (2:1)	Decision (Winners Score:Losers Score)
WO	Walkover (No fight)

== See also ==
- List of WAKO Amateur European Championships
- List of WAKO Amateur World Championships
- List of male kickboxers
