= Men's Low-Kick at W.A.K.O. European Championships 2006 Skopje -67 kg =

Men's Low-Kick Kickboxing at the W.A.K.O. European Championships 2006 (Skopje)
-51 kg
-54 kg
-57 kg
-60 kg
-63.5 kg
-67 kg
-71 kg
-75 kg
-81 kg
-86 kg
-91 kg
+91 kg

The men's welterweight (67 kg/147.4 lbs) Low-Kick division at the W.A.K.O. European Championships 2006 in Skopje was the sixth-lightest of the male Low-Kick tournaments involving fifteen fighters. Each of the matches was three rounds of two minutes each and was fought under Low-Kick kickboxing rules.

Because there was one too few fighters for a sixteen-man competition, one of the participants had a bye through to the quarter-final stage. The tournament gold medallist was Nikolai Shtakhanov, who defeated fellow Russian Evgeny Grechishkin in the final by unanimous decision. Semi finalists Venelin Iankov from Bulgaria and France's Mickael Lallemand won bronze medals for their efforts.

== Results ==
1st round
(Hungary) Robert Szoke
(Russia) Nikolai Shtakhanov	D(3:0)
(North Macedonia) Dalibor Ognjanov	D(2:1)
(Poland) Tomasz Mróz
(Croatia) Vinko Djirlic	D(2:1)
(Spain) Mikel Moreno
(Belarus) Artsem Karotki
(Bulgaria) Venelin Iankov	D(3:0)
(Russia) Evgeny Grechishkin	D(3:0)
(Italy) Alessandro Conca
(North Macedonia) Ardit Gjelili
(Poland) Robert Zytkiewicz	TKO
(Serbia) Sinica Vladimirovic
(France) Mickael Lallemand	TKO

Quarter-finals
(Russia) Nikolai Shtakhanov	D(3:0)
(North Macedonia) Dalibor Ognjanov
(Croatia) Vinko Djirlic
(Bulgaria) Venelin Iankov	D(3:0)
(Russia) Evgeny Grechishkin	D(3:0)
(Poland) Robert Zytkiewicz
(France) Mickael Lallemand	D(2:1)
(Bosnia and Herzegovina) Eldin Raonic

Semi-finals
(Russia) Nikolai Shtakhanov	D(3:0)
(Bulgaria) Venelin Iankov
(Russia) Evgeny Grechishkin	KO
(France) Mickael Lallemand

Final
(Russia) Nikolai Shtakhanov	D(3:0)
(Russia) Evgeny Grechishkin

=== Key ===
Abbreviation	Meaning
D (2:1)	Decision (Winners Score:Losers Score)
KO	Knockout
TKO	Technical Knockout

== See also ==
- List of WAKO Amateur European Championships
- List of WAKO Amateur World Championships
- List of male kickboxers
