= Men's Low-Kick at W.A.K.O. European Championships 2006 Skopje -86 kg =

Men's Low-Kick Kickboxing at the W.A.K.O. European Championships 2006 (Skopje)
-51 kg
-54 kg
-57 kg
-60 kg
-63.5 kg
-67 kg
-71 kg
-75 kg
-81 kg
-86 kg
-91 kg
+91 kg

The men's cruiserweight (86 kg/189.2 lbs) Low-Kick division at the W.A.K.O. European Championships 2006 in Skopje was the third heaviest of the male Low-Kick tournaments and involved nine fighters in total. Each of the matches was three rounds of two minutes each and were fought under Low-Kick kickboxing rules.

Due to the fact there were too few contestants for a tournament fit for sixteen, seven of the participants had a bye through to the quarter-final stage. The tournament gold medal went to Kirill Ivanov from Russia who defeated Croatian Stipe Stipetic in the final by unanimous decision. The bronze medal positions were taken by Dilian Slavov and Vladimir Djordjevic from Bulgaria and Serbia respectively.

== Results ==
1st round
(Italy) Claudio Grazioni
(Poland) Paweł Tracz	KO

Quarter-finals
(Ukraine) Oleg Shevchenko
(Croatia) Stipe Stipetic	D(2:1)
(North Macedonia) Toni Stojanovski
(Bulgaria) Dilian Slavov	KO
(Bosnia and Herzegovina) Bojan Glavas
(Russia) Kirill Ivanov	D(2:1)
(Serbia) Vladimir Djordjevic	D(2:1)
(Poland) Paweł Tracz

Semi-finals
(Croatia) Stipe Stipetic	KO
(Bulgaria) Dilian Slavov
(Russia) Kirill Ivanov	D(2:1)
(Serbia) Vladimir Djordjevic

Final
(Croatia) Stipe Stipetic
(Russia) Kirill Ivanov	D(3:0)

=== Key ===
Abbreviation	Meaning
D (2:1)	Decision (Winners Score:Losers Score)
KO	Knockout

== See also ==
- List of WAKO Amateur European Championships
- List of WAKO Amateur World Championships
- List of male kickboxers
