= Men's Low-Kick at W.A.K.O. European Championships 2006 Skopje -63.5 kg =

Men's Low-Kick Kickboxing at the W.A.K.O. European Championships 2006 (Skopje)
-51 kg
-54 kg
-57 kg
-60 kg
-63.5 kg
-67 kg
-71 kg
-75 kg
-81 kg
-86 kg
-91 kg
+91 kg

The men's light welterweight (63 kg/138.6 lbs) Low-Kick division at the W.A.K.O. European Championships 2006 in Skopje was the fifth lightest of the male Low-Kick tournaments and was one of the largest involving seventeen fighters. Each of the matches was three rounds of two minutes each and were fought under Low-Kick kickboxing rules.

As there were not enough fighters for a sixteen man competition, one of the men received a bye into the quarter-finals. The gold medal was won by Russian Artur Magadov who defeated Denmark's Ayoub Saidi in the final by unanimous decision. Gleb Bozko and Akaev Kurbanali, from Estonia and Russia, received bronze medals.

== Results ==
1st round
(Spain) Aitor Eguzkiza	D(2:1)
(Italy) Marco De Paolis

2nd round
(Bulgaria) Toma Tomov	D(3:0)
(Bosnia and Herzegovina) Adam Radovanovic
(Russia) Artur Magadov	D(3:0)
(Belarus) Yury Valynets
(Croatia) Dejan Petric
(France) Jamel Achemaoui	D(3:0)
(Bosnia and Herzegovina) Zoran Kerkez
(Estonia) Gleb Bozko	D(2:1)
(Serbia) Sreten Miletic	D(3:0)
(Hungary) Simon László
(Ukraine) Olexandr Gibert
(Russia) Kurbanali Akaev	D(3:0)
(North Macedonia) Arafat Imeri
(Denmark) Ayoub Saidi	KO
(Spain) Aitor Eguzkiza	D(2:1)
(Austria) Wolfgang Goger

Quarter-finals
(Bulgaria) Toma Tomov
(Russia) Artur Magadov	D(3:0)
(France) Jamel Achemaoui
(Estonia) Gleb Bozko	D(3:0)
(Serbia) Sreten Miletic
(Russia) Kurbanali Akaev	D(3:0)
(Denmark) Ayoub Saidi	D(3:0)
(Spain) Aitor Eguzkiza

Semi-finals
(Russia) Artur Magadov	D(3:0)
(Estonia) Gleb Bozko
(Russia) Kurbanali Akaev
(Denmark) Ayoub Saidi	D(3:0)

Final
(Russia) Artur Magadov	D(3:0)
(Denmark) Ayoub Saidi

=== Key ===
Abbreviation	Meaning
D (2:1)	Decision (Winners Score:Losers Score)
KO	Knockout

== See also ==
- List of WAKO Amateur European Championships
- List of WAKO Amateur World Championships
- List of male kickboxers
