= Men's Low-Kick at W.A.K.O. European Championships 2006 Skopje -81 kg =

| Men's Low-Kick Kickboxing at the W.A.K.O. European Championships 2006 (Skopje) |
|---|
| -51 kg |
| -54 kg |
| -57 kg |
| -60 kg |
| -63.5 kg |
| -67 kg |
| -71 kg |
| -75 kg |
| -81 kg |
| -86 kg |
| -91 kg |
| +91 kg |

The men's light heavyweight (81 kg/178.2 lbs) Low-Kick division at the W.A.K.O. European Championships 2006 in Skopje was the fourth heaviest of the male Low-Kick tournaments and the largest involving twenty fighters. Each of the matches was three rounds of two minutes each and were fought under Low-Kick kickboxing rules.

As there were too few men for a tournament fit for thirty-two, twelve of the contestants received a bye through to the 2nd round. The gold medal was won by emerging Serb star Nenad Pagonis who won his first W.A.K.O. championships by defeating Bosnian Drazenko Ninic in the final by unanimous decision. Rail Rajabov from Azerbaijan and Teppo Laine from Finland won bronze medals for their efforts in reaching the semi-finals.

== Results ==
1st round
(Azerbaijan) Ehram Medjidov | D(3:0)
(Poland) Piotr Czosnyka
(Italy) Roberto Margiotti
(Belarus) Aliaksandr Kryvarotau | D(3:0)
(Azerbaijan) Rail Rajabov | D(2:1)
(Poland) Pawel Jedrzejczak
(Croatia) Luka Simic | D(2:1)
(Hungary) Mihaly Karosi

2nd round
(Finland) Teppo Laine | KO
(North Macedonia) Tace Jeftimov
(Bulgaria) Jordan Ivanov | D(2:1)
(Azerbaijan) Ehram Medjidov
(Serbia) Nenad Pagonis | KO
(Portugal) Leonildo Domingos
(France) Pierre Hudault
(Belarus) Aliaksandr Kryvarotau | D(3:0)
(Romania) Sebastian Ciobanu
(North Macedonia) Riste Ristov | WO
(Russia) Aslan Pazov
(Azerbaijan) Rail Rajabov | D(2:1)
(Ukraine) Anatoly Dyakov | KO
(Serbia) Boban Stojanović
(Croatia) Luka Simic
(Bosnia and Herzegovina) Ninic Drazenko | KO

Quarter-finals
(Finland) Teppo Laine | D(2:1)
(Bulgaria) Jordan Ivanov
(Serbia) Nenad Pagonis | D(2:1)
(Belarus) Aliaksandr Kryvarotau
(North Macedonia) Riste Ristov
(Azerbaijan) Rail Rajabov | D(3:0)
(Ukraine) Anatoly Dyakov
(Bosnia and Herzegovina) Ninic Drazenko | D(2:1)

Semi-finals
(Finland) Teppo Laine
(Serbia) Nenad Pagonis | D(2:1)
(Azerbaijan) Rail Rajabov
(Bosnia and Herzegovina) Ninic Drazenko | D(2:1)

Final
(Serbia) Nenad Pagonis | D(2:1)
(Bosnia and Herzegovina) Ninic Drazenko

=== Key ===
| Abbreviation | Meaning |
|---|---|
| D (2:1) | Decision (Winners Score:Losers Score) |
| KO | Knockout |
| WO | Walkover (No fight) |

== See also ==
- List of WAKO Amateur European Championships
- List of WAKO Amateur World Championships
- List of male kickboxers
