= Men's Low-Kick at W.A.K.O. European Championships 2006 Skopje -54 kg =

Men's Low-Kick Kickboxing at the W.A.K.O. European Championships 2006 (Skopje)
-51 kg
-54 kg
-57 kg
-60 kg
-63.5 kg
-67 kg
-71 kg
-75 kg
-81 kg
-86 kg
-91 kg
+91 kg

The men's bantamweight (54 kg/118.8 lbs) Low-Kick division at the W.A.K.O. European Championships 2006 in Skopje was the second lightest of the male Low-Kick tournaments and was one of the smallest involving just four fighters. Each of the matches was three rounds of two minutes each and were fought under Low-Kick kickboxing rules.

The tournament gold medal position was won by Jordan Vasilev from Bulgaria who defeated Emil Karimov from Azerbaijan in the final by split decision. Defeated semi finalists, Boban Marinkovic and Mokhmad Betmirzaev from Serbia and Russia respectively, won bronze medals for their efforts.

== Results ==
Semi Finals
(Azerbaijan) Emil Karimov	D(3:0)
(Russia) Mokhmad Betmirzaev
(Bulgaria) Jordan Vasilev	D(3:0)
(Serbia) Boban Marinkovic

Final
(Azerbaijan) Emil Karimov
(Bulgaria) Jordan Vasilev	D(2:1)

=== Key ===
Abbreviation	Meaning
D (2:1)	Decision (Winners Score:Losers Score)
KO	Knockout
TKO	Technical Knockout
AB	Abandonment (Injury in match)
WO	Walkover (No fight)
DQ	Disqualification

== See also ==
- List of WAKO Amateur European Championships
- List of WAKO Amateur World Championships
- List of male kickboxers
