= Men's Low-Kick at W.A.K.O. European Championships 2006 Skopje -57 kg =

Men's Low-Kick Kickboxing at the W.A.K.O. European Championships 2006 (Skopje)
-51 kg
-54 kg
-57 kg
-60 kg
-63.5 kg
-67 kg
-71 kg
-75 kg
-81 kg
-86 kg
-91 kg
+91 kg

The men's featherweight (57 kg/125.4 lbs) Low-Kick division at the W.A.K.O. European Championships 2006 in Skopje was the third lightest of the male Low-Kick tournaments and involved only six fighters. Each of the matches was three rounds of two minutes each and were fought under Low-Kick kickboxing rules.

Due to there not being enough men for a tournament fit for eight, two of the fighters received byes through to the semi-finals. The tournament gold medal went to Russia's Zurab Faroyan, who defeated Serb Milos Anic in the final by split decision. It was Zurab's fourth gold medal in a row at a W.A.K.O. championships and fifth overall (Paris '03, Agadir '05, Szeged '05, Lisbon '06, Skopje '06). Gabor Kiss from Hungary and Mariusz Cieśliński from Poland won bronze.

== Results ==
Quarter-finals		Semi-finals		Final
		(Serbia) Milos Anic	D(3:0)
(Hungary) Gabor Kiss	D(3:0)	(Hungary) Gabor Kiss
(Poland) Tomasz Makowski				(Serbia) Milos Anic
(Spain) José Luis Sánchez				(Russia) Zurab Faroyan	D(2:1)
(Russia) Zurab Faroyan	WO	(Russia) Zurab Faroyan	D(2:1)
		(Poland) Mariusz Cieśliński

=== Key ===
Abbreviation	Meaning
D (2:1)	Decision (Winners Score:Losers Score)
WO	Walkover (No fight)

== See also ==
- List of WAKO Amateur European Championships
- List of WAKO Amateur World Championships
- List of male kickboxers
