= Men's Low-Kick at W.A.K.O. European Championships 2006 Skopje -75 kg =

Men's Low-Kick Kickboxing at the W.A.K.O. European Championships 2006 (Skopje)
-51 kg
-54 kg
-57 kg
-60 kg
-63.5 kg
-67 kg
-71 kg
-75 kg
-81 kg
-86 kg
-91 kg
+91 kg

The men's middleweight (75 kg/165 lb) Low-Kick division at the W.A.K.O. European Championships 2006 in Skopje was the fifth heaviest of the male Low-Kick tournaments involving fifteen fighters. Each of the matches was three rounds of two minutes each and were fought under Low-Kick kickboxing rules.

As there were too few fighters for a tournament designed for sixteen, one of the participants received a bye into the quarter-finals. The tournament gold medal was won by Russian Ibragim Tamazaev who defeated Serbian Dragan Mićić in the final by unanimous decision. It was Tamazaev's second gold at W.A.K.O. in Low-Kick as he was the defending world champion from Agadir 2005. Defeated semi finalists Leszek Koltun from Poland and Stelian Angelov from Bulgaria won bronze medals.

== Results ==
1st round
(Italy) Stefano Paone
(Russia) Ibragim Tamazaev	D(3:0)
(Ukraine) Dmytro Osobskiy	D(3:0)
(Montenegro) Miloje Petrovic
(Hungary) Adam Gerzsai	D(2:1)
(Serbia) Alexander Bojic
(North Macedonia) Mite Stojkov
(Poland) Leszek Koltun	KO
(Poland) Rafal Dudek	D(2:1)
(France) Odje Manda
(Bulgaria) Stelian Angelov	D(3:0)
(North Macedonia) Kole Petanceski
(Bosnia and Herzegovina) Dzemal Mahmic	D(2:1)
(Azerbaijan) Kamil Sharifov

Quarter-finals
(Russia) Ibragim Tamazaev	D(3:0)
(Ukraine) Dmytro Osobskiy
(Hungary) Adam Gerzsai
(Poland) Leszek Koltun	D(2:1)
(Poland) Rafal Dudek
(Bulgaria) Stelian Angelov	D(3:0)
(Bosnia and Herzegovina) Dzemal Mahmic
(Serbia) Dragan Mićić	D(3:0)

Semi-finals
(Russia) Ibragim Tamazaev	D(3:0)
(Poland) Leszek Koltun
(Bulgaria) Stelian Angelov
(Serbia) Dragan Mićić	D(2:1)

Final
(Russia) Ibragim Tamazaev	D(3:0)
(Serbia) Dragan Mićić

=== Key ===
Abbreviation	Meaning
D (2:1)	Decision (Winners Score:Losers Score)
KO	Knockout

== See also ==
- List of WAKO Amateur European Championships
- List of WAKO Amateur World Championships
- List of male kickboxers
