= Men's Low-Kick at W.A.K.O. European Championships 2006 Skopje -71 kg =

Kickboxing competition

Men's Low-Kick Kickboxing at the W.A.K.O. European Championships 2006 (Skopje)
-51 kg
-54 kg
-57 kg
-60 kg
-63.5 kg
-67 kg
-71 kg
-75 kg
-81 kg
-86 kg
-91 kg
+91 kg

The men's light middleweight (71 kg/156.2 lbs) Low-Kick division at the W.A.K.O. European Championships 2006 in Skopje was the sixth heaviest of the male Low-Kick tournaments and involved fifteen fighters. Each of the matches was three rounds of two minutes each and were fought under Low-Kick kickboxing rules.

As there were too few fighters for a tournament designed for sixteen, one of the men received a bye into the quarter-finals. The tournament gold medal was won by Konstantin Sbytov from Russia who defeated Serbian Milan Dragojlovic in the final via a unanimous decision victory. It was Konstantin's second gold medal in a row and his third overall (he had also won at Budva '04 and Agadir '05). Defeated semi finalists Michał Głogowski from Poland and Ludovic Millet from France, who would both go on to have successful pro careers, won bronze medals for their efforts.

== Results ==
1st round
(Serbia) Milan Dragojlovic	D(3:0)
(Slovakia) Miroslav Kormańoš
(Bosnia and Herzegovina) Emir Tarahija	D(3:0)
(Hungary) Peter Abraham
(France) Ludovic Millet	TKO
(Italy) Andrea Andrenacci
(North Macedonia) Alit Aliov
(Russia) Batu Khasikov	WO
(Poland) Bartosz Pietruszewski
(Bulgaria) Alexander Ignatov	D(3:0)
(Serbia) Goran Milenkovic
(Russia) Konstantin Sbytov	KO
(Croatia) Hrvoje Crnic	D(3:0)
(Montenegro) Petar Knežević

Quarter-finals
(Serbia) Milan Dragojlovic	D(3:0)
(Bosnia and Herzegovina) Emir Tarahija
(France) Ludovic Millet	D(2:1)
(Russia) Batu Khasikov
(Bulgaria) Alexander Ignatov
(Russia) Konstantin Sbytov	AB
(Croatia) Hrvoje Crnic
(Poland) Michał Głogowski	AB

Semi-finals
(Serbia) Milan Dragojlovic	D(2:1)
(France) Ludovic Millet
(Russia) Konstantin Sbytov	D(3:0)
(Poland) Michał Głogowski

Final
(Serbia) Milan Dragojlovic
(Russia) Konstantin Sbytov	D(3:0)

=== Key ===
Abbreviation	Meaning
D (2:1)	Decision (Winners Score:Losers Score)
KO	Knockout
TKO	Technical Knockout
AB	Abandonment (Injury in match)
WO	Walkover (No fight)

== See also ==
- List of WAKO Amateur European Championships
- List of WAKO Amateur World Championships
- List of male kickboxers
