= Men's Low-Kick at W.A.K.O. European Championships 2006 Skopje -91 kg =

Men's Low-Kick Kickboxing at the W.A.K.O. European Championships 2006 (Skopje)
-51 kg
-54 kg
-57 kg
-60 kg
-63.5 kg
-67 kg
-71 kg
-75 kg
-81 kg
-86 kg
-91 kg
+91 kg

The men's heavyweight (91 kg/200.2 lbs) Low-Kick division at the W.A.K.O. European Championships 2006 in Skopje was the second heaviest of the male Low-Kick tournaments involving nine fighters. Each of the matches was three rounds of two minutes each and were fought under Low-Kick kickboxing rules.

As there were not enough men for a tournament designed for sixteen, seven of the fighters received a bye through to the quarter-finals. The tournament gold medal was won by Dimitri Antonenko from Russia who defeated reigning W.A.K.O. world champion Serbia's Dejan Milosavljevic in the final by split decision. Sasa Cirovic and Ivan Stanić from Serbia and Croatia had to make do with bronze medals.

== Results ==
1st round
(Switzerland) Remo Probst
(Italy) Umberto Lucci	D(3:0)

Quarter-finals
(Russia) Dimitri Antonenko	AB
(Ukraine) Dmytro Mozolievskyi
(Serbia) Sasa Cirovic	D(3:0)
(North Macedonia) Aleksandar Stevkovski
(Bulgaria) Krasimir Kolev
(Croatia) Ivan Stanić	D(3:0)
(Italy) Umberto Lucci
(Serbia) Dejan Milosavljevic	D(3:0)

Semi-finals
(Russia) Dimitri Antonenko	D(3:0)
(Serbia) Sasa Cirovic
(Croatia) Ivan Stanić
(Serbia) Dejan Milosavljevic	D(3:0)

Final
(Russia) Dimitri Antonenko	D(2:1)
(Serbia) Dejan Milosavljevic

=== Key ===
Abbreviation	Meaning
D (2:1)	Decision (Winners Score:Losers Score)
AB	Abandonment (Injury in match)

== See also ==
- List of WAKO Amateur European Championships
- List of WAKO Amateur World Championships
- List of male kickboxers
