= Men's Full-Contact at WAKO World Championships 2007 Coimbra -60 kg =

The men's lightweight (60 kg/132 lbs) Full-Contact category at the W.A.K.O. World Championships 2007 in Coimbra was the fourth lightest of the male Full-Contact tournaments, involving twelve fighters from three continents (Europe, Asia and Africa). Each of the matches was three rounds of two minutes each and were fought under Full-Contact rules.

Because there were not enough men for a tournament designed for sixteen, four fighters had byes through to the quarter-final stage. The tournament final was a repeat of the Low Kick final held a month or so earlier in Belgrade, with Russian Zurab Faroyan once again defeating Azerbaijani opponent Eduard Mammadov by split decision to claim the gold. Defeated semi finalists, Kornel Sandor from Hungary and Daniel Martins from France, won bronze medals.

== Results ==
1st round
(Sweden) Thomas Karlsson	D(3:0)
(Turkmenistan) Orazmuhammed Komekov
(Russia) Zurab Faroyan	D(3:0)
(Italy) Roberto Pizzagalli
(Turkey) Fikri Arican
(Azerbaijan) Eduard Mammadov	D(2:1)
(Portugal) Bruno Machado
(Spain) Rubén Ferrer	D(3:0)

Quarter-finals
(Hungary) Kornel Sandor	D(2:1)
(Sweden) Thomas Karlsson
(Kazakhstan) Aset Toleuov
(Russia) Zurab Faroyan	D(3:0)
(Slovakia) Maros Pacan
(Azerbaijan) Eduard Mammadov	D(3:0)
(Spain) Rubén Ferrer
(France) Daniel Martins	D(3:0)

Semi-finals
(Hungary) Kornel Sandor
(Russia) Zurab Faroyan	D(3:0)
(Azerbaijan) Eduard Mammadov	D(2:1)
(France) Daniel Martins

Final
(Russia) Zurab Faroyan	D(3:0)
(Azerbaijan) Eduard Mammadov

=== Key ===
Abbreviation	Meaning
D (3:0)	Decision (Unanimous)
D (2:1)	Decision (Split)

== See also ==
- List of WAKO Amateur World Championships
- List of WAKO Amateur European Championships
- List of male kickboxers
