= Men's Low-Kick at W.A.K.O. European Championships 2006 Skopje -51 kg =

Men's Low-Kick Kickboxing at the W.A.K.O. European Championships 2006 (Skopje)
-51 kg
-54 kg
-57 kg
-60 kg
-63.5 kg
-67 kg
-71 kg
-75 kg
-81 kg
-86 kg
-91 kg
+91 kg

The men's light bantamweight (51 kg/112.2 lbs) Low-Kick division at the W.A.K.O. European Championships 2006 in Skopje was the lightest of the male Low-Kick tournaments and was one of the smallest involving just four fighters. Each of the matches was three rounds of two minutes each and were fought under Low-Kick kickboxing rules.

The tournament gold medal was won by Russian Aleksandar Aleksandrov who defeated Azerbaijan's Nijat Huseynov in the final by split decision. The bronze medal positions were occupied by defeated semi finalists, Rasim Aliti from hosts Macedonia and Afanasiev Klimeni from Russia.

== Results ==
Semi Finals
(Azerbaijan) Nijat Huseynov	D(3:0)
(North Macedonia) Rasim Aliti
(Russia) Aleksandar Aleksandrov	D(3:0)
(Russia) Afanasiev Klimeni

Final
(Azerbaijan) Nijat Huseynov
(Russia) Aleksandar Aleksandrov	D(2:1)

=== Key ===
Abbreviation	Meaning
D (2:1)	Decision (Winners Score:Losers Score)
KO	Knockout
TKO	Technical Knockout
AB	Abandonment (Injury in match)
WO	Walkover (No fight)
DQ	Disqualification

== See also ==
- List of WAKO Amateur European Championships
- List of WAKO Amateur World Championships
- List of male kickboxers
