= Dragan Jovanović (kickboxer) =

Serbian kickboxer (born 1977)

- Born: Dragan Jovanović; October 10, 1977 (age 49); Serbia
- Other names: Gagi
- Nationality: Serbian
- Height: 1.81 m (5 ft 11 1/2 in)
- Weight: 100 kg (220 lb; 15 st 10 lb)
- Division: Heavyweight
- Style: Kickboxing
- Stance: Orthodox
- Fighting out of: Belgrade, Serbia
- Team: Crvena Zvezda Delije

Dragan "Gagi" Jovanović (born 10 October 1977) is a Serbian heavyweight kickboxer, multiple W.A.K.O. European and World champion, and W.A.K.O. Pro Full-Contact Rules European Champion.

He challenged Alban Galonnier for W.A.K.O. Pro Low Kick Rules Super Heavyweight World Title on 15 May 2008 in Serbia, losing the fight by 3rd-round TKO.

== Titles ==
- 2012 W.A.K.O. European Championships (gold) +91 kg (low-kick rules)
- 2012 W.A.K.O. World Cup (gold) +91 kg (low-kick rules)
- 2011 W.A.K.O World Championships (silver) +91 kg (low-kick rules)
- 2011 W.A.K.O Balkans Championships (silver) +91 kg (low-kick rules)
- 2011 Serbia Open Cup Champion +91 kg
- 2009 W.A.K.O World Championships (silver) +91 kg (low-kick rules)
- 2009 W.A.K.O. World Cup (silver) +91 kg (low-kick rules)
- 2008 W.A.K.O. European Championships (silver) +91 kg (low-kick rules)
- 2007 W.A.K.O. World Championships (gold) +91 kg (low-kick rules)
- 2006 W.A.K.O. European Championships (gold) +91 kg (low-kick rules)
- 2005 2005 W.A.K.O. World Championships (silver) +91 kg (low-kick rules)
- 2004 W.A.K.O. Balkans Championships (gold) (low-kick rules)
- 2004 W.A.K.O. Pro Full-Contact Rules European Champion
- 2002 W.A.K.O. European Championships (silver) +91 kg (low-kick rulse)
- 2001 W.A.K.O. World Championships (silver) +91 kg (Thai-boxing rules)
- 2001 W.A.K.O. Balkans Championships (gold) (low-kick rules)
- Multiple Low-Kick and Thai-Boxing champion of Serbia
- Multiple Low-Kick and Thai-Boxing champion of Serbia and Montenegro

== Kickboxing record ==
Professional kickboxing record
Date	Result	Opponent	Event	Location	Method	Round	Time
2013-09-22	Loss	(Azerbaijan) Zabit Samedov	Heydar Aliyev Cup 2013	Baku, Azerbaijan	Decision (split)	3	3:00
2012-12-28	Loss	(Bosnia and Herzegovina) Samed Osmanović	Noć Šampiona VI	Tuzla, Bosnia and Herzegovina	Decision	3	3:00
2012-12-09	Loss	(Croatia) Toni Milanović	Supreme FC	Belgrade, Serbia	Decision (unanimous)	3	3:00
2009-07-03	Win	(Croatia) Domagoj Ostojić	K-1 ColliZion 2009 Sarajevo	Sarajevo, Bosnia and Herzegovina	KO	3	1:25
2008-05-16	Loss	(France) Alban Galonnier	Trofej Beograda - Noć svetskih prvaka	Belgrade, Serbia	TKO	3	
For W.A.K.O. Pro Low Kick Rules Super Heavyweight World Title.
2008-01-12	Win	(Croatia) Dražen Ordulj	Lord of Ring	Belgrade, Serbia	TKO (low kick)	3	
2007	Win	(Australia) Eric Nosa	Memorijal Arkan		TKO	1	
2007-04-25	Win	(Australia) Eric Nosa	Best of the Best	Sydney, Australia	KO	3	
2007-03-10	Loss	(Germany) James Phillips	K-1 Fighting Network Croatia 2007, Quarter Finals	Spalato, Croatia	Decision (unanimous)	3	3:00
2006-12-15	Win	(Croatia) Marin Došen	King of the Fire - Europe	Belgrade, Serbia	Decision	3	3:00
2006-10-15	Loss	(Croatia) Igor Jurković	Hrvatska - Srbija	Osijek, Croatia	Decision (unanimous)	3	3:00
2005-03-12	Loss	(Australia) Jason Suttie	Tarik Solak's Show	Sydney, Australia	Decision	3	3:00
2004	Win						
Wins W.A.K.O. Pro Full-Contact Rules European Title.
2002-04-13	Loss	(Albania) Xhavit Bajrami	K-1 World Grand Prix 2002 Preliminary Croatia, Quarter Finals	Zagreb, Croatia	TKO	3	
	Win	(Hungary) Tibor Nagy			KO	2	
	Loss	(Bosnia and Herzegovina) Adnan Redžović		Sarajevo, Bosnia and Herzegovina	Decision (unanimous)		

Amateur kickboxing record
Date	Result	Opponent	Event	Location	Method	Round	Time
2012-11-02	Win	(Russia) Ragim Aliev	W.A.K.O European Championships 2012, Low-Kick Final +91 kg	Ankara, Turkey	Decision (unanimous)	3	2:00
Wins W.A.K.O. European Championship '12 Low-Kick Gold Medal +91 kg.
2012-11-02	Win	(Belarus) Yauheni Makarau	W.A.K.O European Championships 2012, Low-Kick Semi Finals +91 kg	Ankara, Turkey	Decision (unanimous)	3	2:00
2012-10-31	Win	(Azerbaijan) Agalar Sadikhov	W.A.K.O European Championships 2012, Low-Kick Quarter Finals +91 kg	Ankara, Turkey	Decision (split)	3	2:00
2012-05-21	Win	(Belarus) Yauheni Makarau	W.A.K.O World Cup 2012, Low-Kick Semi Finals +91 kg	Szeged, Hungary	Decision (unanimous)	3	2:00
Wins W.A.K.O. World Cup '12 Low-Kick Gold Medal +91 kg.
2012-05-20	Win	(Croatia) Zoran Krpan	W.A.K.O World Cup 2012, Low-Kick Semi Finals +91 kg	Szeged, Hungary	Decision (unanimous)	3	2:00
2011-11-02	Loss	(Croatia) Dino Belošević	W.A.K.O World Championships 2011, Low-Kick Final +91 kg	Skopje, Macedonia	Decision (unanimous)	3	2:00
Wins W.A.K.O. World Championship '12 Low-Kick Silver Medal +91 kg.
2011-10-28	Win	(Belarus) Yauheni Makarau	W.A.K.O World Championships 2011, Low-Kick Semi Finals +91 kg	Skopje, Macedonia	Decision (unanimous)	3	2:00
2011-10-26	Win	(Ukraine) Iuril Gorbenko	W.A.K.O World Championships 2011, Low-Kick Quarter Finals +91 kg	Skopje, Macedonia	Decision (unanimous)	3	2:00
2011-05-28	Loss	(Bosnia and Herzegovina) Samed Osmanović	W.A.K.O. Balkans Championships 2011, Low-Kick Final +91 kg	Belgrade, Serbia	Decision (split)	3	2:00
Wins W.A.K.O. Balkans Championships '11 Low-Kick Silver Medal +91 kg.
2011-03-06	Win	(North Macedonia) Goran Grošev	2. Serbia Open Cup 2011, Final	Belgrade, Serbia	KO	1	
Wins Serbia Open Cup +91 kg.
2011-03-05	Win	(Serbia) Ivan Ćirković	2. Serbia Open Cup 2011, Semi Finals	Belgrade, Serbia	Decision (unanimous)	3	2:00
2010-10-18	Loss	(Turkey) Hamza Kendrikoglu	W.A.K.O European Championships 2010, Low-Kick Quarter Finals +91 kg	Baku, Azerbaijan	Decision (split)	3	2:00
2009-10-26	Loss	(Montenegro) Goran Radonjić	W.A.K.O World Championships 2009, Low-Kick Final +91 kg	Villach, Austria	KO (low kick)	1	
Wins W.A.K.O. World Championship '09 Low-Kick Silver Medal +91 kg.
2009-10-24	Win	(France) Cadet Noel	W.A.K.O World Championships 2009, Low-Kick Semi Finals +91 kg	Villach, Austria	Decision (split)	3	2:00
2008-11	Loss	(Russia) Sergey Polivoda	W.A.K.O European Championships 2008, Low-Kick Final +91 kg	Porto, Portugal	Decision (split)	3	2:00
Wins W.A.K.O. European Championship '08 Low-Kick Silver Medal +91 kg.
2008-11	Win	(Montenegro) Mirko Vlahović	W.A.K.O European Championships 2008, Low-Kick Semi Finals +91 kg	Porto, Portugal			
2007-09-30	Win	(Russia) Mikhail Shvoev	W.A.K.O World Championships 2007, Low-Kick Final +91 kg	Belgrade, Serbia	Decision (unanimous)	3	2:00
Wins W.A.K.O. World Championship '07 Low-Kick Gold Medal +91 kg.
2007-09-?	Win	(Kazakhstan) Ruslan Aushev	W.A.K.O World Championships 2007, Low-Kick Semi Final +91 kg	Belgrade, Serbia	Decision (unanimous)	3	2:00
2007-09-?	Win	(Morocco) Imad El Mountahi	W.A.K.O World Championships 2007, Low-Kick Quarter Finals +91 kg	Belgrade, Serbia	Decision (split)	3	2:00
2006-11	Win	(Azerbaijan) Hafiz Bakhshaliyev	W.A.K.O European Championships 2006, Low-Kick Final +91 kg	Skopje, Macedonia	Decision (unanimous)	3	2:00
Wins W.A.K.O. European Championship '06 Low-Kick Gold Medal +91 kg.
2006-11	Win	(Montenegro) Goran Radonjić	W.A.K.O European Championships 2006, Low-Kick Semi Final +91 kg	Skopje, Macedonia	Decision (split)	3	2:00
2005-09-??	Loss	(Poland) Łukasz Jarosz	W.A.K.O World Championships 2005, Low-Kick Final +91 kg	Agadir, Morocco			
Wins W.A.K.O. World Championship '05 Low-Kick Silver Medal +91 kg.
2005-09-??	Win		W.A.K.O World Championships 2005, Low-Kick Semi Finals +91 kg	Agadir, Morocco			
2004-11	Loss	(Italy) Daniele Petroni	W.A.K.O European Championships 2004, Low-Kick Semi Finals +91 kg	Budva, Montenegro	Decision (unanimous)	3	2:00
Wins W.A.K.O. European Championship '04 Low-Kick Bronze Medal +911 kg.
2002	Loss	(Russia) Ruslan Bisaev	W.A.K.O. European Championships 2002, Low-Kick Final +91 kg	Jesolo, Italy			
Wins W.A.K.O. European Championship '02 Low-Kick Silver Medal +91 kg.
2002	Win		W.A.K.O. European Championships 2002, Low-Kick Semi Finals +91 kg	Jesolo, Italy			
2001	Loss	(Ukraine) Sergei Arkhipov	W.A.K.O. World Championships 2001, Thai-Boxing Final +91 kg	Belgrade, Serbia and Montenegro			
Wins W.A.K.O. World Championship '01 Thai-Boxing Silver Medal +91 kg.
2001	Win		W.A.K.O. World Championships 2001, Thai-Boxing Semi Finals +91 kg	Belgrade, Serbia and Montenegro			

Legend: Win Loss Draw/No contest Notes

== Boxing record ==
0 wins, 2 losses, 0 draws
Res.	Record	Opponent	Type	Rd., time	Date	Location	Notes
Loss	0-2	(Bulgaria) Spas Genov	DEC	3 (3); 3:00	2012-09-21	(Bulgaria) Varna	Bigger's Better 15: quarterfinal.
Loss	0-1	(Angola) Henriques Zowa	DEC	3 (3); 3:00	2012-02-24	(Bulgaria) Burgas	Bigger's Better 10: quarterfinal.

== See also ==
- List of WAKO Amateur World Championships
- List of WAKO Amateur European Championships
- List of male kickboxers
