= Men's Low-Kick at WAKO World Championships 2007 Belgrade +91 kg =

The men's super heavyweight (over 91 kg/200.2 lbs) Low-Kick category at the W.A.K.O. World Championships 2007 in Belgrade was the second heaviest of the male Low-Kick tournaments, involving twelve fighters from three continents (Europe, Asia and Africa). Each of the matches was three rounds of two minutes each and were fought under Low-Kick rules.

As there were no enough contestants for a sixteen-man tournament, four of the fighters received byes through to the quarter finals. The tournament gold medallist was Dragan Jovanović from Serbia who defeated Mikhail Shvoev from Russia in the final by unanimous decision. Defeated semi finalists Hafiz Bahshaliyev from Azerbaijan and Ruslan Aushev from Kazakhstan won bronze medals.

== Results ==
1st Round
(Portugal) Humberto Evora
(Belarus) Eduard Vaznovich	D(2:1)
(Russia) Mikhail Shvoev	D(3:0)
(Iraq) Hawbeer Salam
(Kazakhstan) Ruslan Aushev
(Bulgaria) Todor Todorov	D(3:0)
(Slovakia) Lukas Simek
(Morocco) Imad El Mountahi	D(2:1)

Quarter Finals
(Azerbaijan) Hafiz Bahshaliyev	D(3:0)
(Belarus) Eduard Vaznovich
(Croatia) Marin Došen
(Russia) Mikhail Shvoev	D(2:1)
(Ukraine) Yaroslav Mudryy
(Kazakhstan) Ruslan Aushev	DQ
(Morocco) Imad El Mountahi
(Serbia) Dragan Jovanović	D(2:1)

Semi Finals
(Azerbaijan) Hafiz Bahshaliyev
(Russia) Mikhail Shvoev	D(2:1)
(Kazakhstan) Ruslan Aushev
(Serbia) Dragan Jovanović	D(3:0)

Final
(Russia) Mikhail Shvoev
(Serbia) Dragan Jovanović	D(3:0)

=== Key ===
Abbreviation	Meaning
D (3:0)	Decision (Unanimous)
D (2:1)	Decision (Split)
DQ	Disqualification

== See also ==
- List of WAKO Amateur World Championships
- List of WAKO Amateur European Championships
- List of male kickboxers
