= W.A.K.O. World Championships 2003 =

W.A.K.O. World Championships 2003 (Paris)
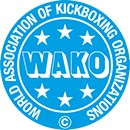
- The poster for W.A.K.O. World Championships 2003 (Paris)
- Promotion: W.A.K.O.
- Date: October 21 (Start); October 26, 2003 (End)
- Venue: Palais des Sports Marcel-Cerdan
- City: Paris, France

Event chronology
W.A.K.O. European Championships 2002	W.A.K.O. World Championships 2003 (Paris)	W.A.K.O. World Championships 2003 (Yalta)

W.A.K.O. World Championships 2003 in Paris were the joint fourteenth world championships held by the W.A.K.O. and the first ever to be held in France. The other (joint) world championships were to be held in November of the same year in Yalta, Ukraine. The event was open to amateur men and women with approximately 780 athletes from 63 countries across the world taking part.

There were four styles on offer at Paris; Full-Contact, Light-Contact, Semi-Contact and Aero-Kickboxing. The other W.A.K.O. styles (Low-Kick, Thai-Boxing and Musical Forms) would be held at the second event later in the year at Yalta. By the end of the championships, Russia was the strongest nation in terms of medals won, with Hungary in second and Italy in third. The event was held between five days at the Palais des Sports Marcel-Cerdan in Paris, France, starting on Tuesday, October 21 and finishing on Sunday, October 26, 2003.

== Full-Contact ==
Full-Contact is a form of kickboxing where strikes above the waist are allowed to be thrown at full force, with wins usually occurring either via knockout or by a point's decision. As with most other forms of amateur kickboxing all contestants must wear head and body protection. More information on the rules can be found at the official W.A.K.O. website. At Paris the men had twelve weight divisions ranging from 51 kg/112.2 lbs to over 91 kg/+200.2 lbs, while the women had seven ranging from 48 kg/105.6 lbs to over 70 kg/+143 lbs. Notable winners included a young Muamer Hukić (more commonly known as the cruiserweight boxing champion Marco Huck) who added to the gold he won at the last European championships, and Ruslan Karaev who would have a number of fights (and win several titles) with the K-1 organization. Other notable winners included Fouad Habbani who won his third straight gold medal in Full-Contact at a W.A.K.O. championships, while Olesya Gladkova, Oksana Vasilieva and Oksana Vasilieva had all won gold medals at the last Europeans. By the end of the championships, Russia was by far the strongest nation in the style, winning nine golds, four silvers and two bronze.

=== Men's Full-Contact Kickboxing Medals Table ===
Event	Gold	Silver	Bronze
-51 kg	Ayup Arsaev (Russia)	Miras Brimzkanov (Kazakhstan)	Abdel Fettah Boukhalfa (Morocco); Utkir Hudayarov (Kyrgyzstan)
-54 kg	Mirbek Suiumbaev (Kyrgyzstan)	Filip Ehsan (Bulgaria)	Alexandre Bossuyt (France); Nurbolat Rysmagambetov (Kazakhstan)
-57 kg	Fouad Habbani (France)	Ali Albisheh (Jordan)	Marat Egeian (Russia); Mustapha Ben-Sihmed (Morocco)
-60 kg	Artur Tazleian (Russia)	Yuri Romanko (Ukraine)	Daniel Martins (New Caledonia); Tarik Ben-Sihmed (Morocco)
-63.5 kg	Alexandru Pogorelov (Moldova)	Arild Mikarlsen (Norway)	Zsolt Nagy (Hungary); Orazmuhammed Byashimov (Turkmenistan)
-67 kg	Jere Reinikainen (Finland)	Roman Pechuk (Russia)	Eldin Raonic (Bosnia and Herzegovina); Sidi Koite (New Caledonia)
-71 kg	Igor Kulbaev (Russia)	Ruslan Batrutdinov (Ukraine)	Sindre Walstad (Norway); Azamat Naurzbaev (Kazakhstan)
-75 kg	Nermin Basovic (Bosnia and Herzegovina)	Tomasz Walenski (Poland)	Markus Hakulinen (Morocco); Azzedine Mhiyaovi (Morocco)
-81 kg	Maxim Voronov (Russia)	Alan Kotsoev (Moldova)	Christophe Lartisien (France); Marcin Rogozik (Poland)
-86 kg	Marco Huck (Germany)	Anatoliy Nosarev (Russia)	Slobodan Marinkovic (Serbia and Montenegro); Taranali Karifala (Sierra Leone)
-91 kg	Ruslan Karaev (Russia)	Gabor Meiszter (Hungary)	Corneliu Rus (Romania); Łukasz Jarosz (Poland)
+91 kg	Yaroslav Zavorotny (Ukraine)	Seyed Ali Mirmiran (Iran)	Ruslan Avsov (Kyrgyzstan); Vecheslav Sepchuk (Russia)

=== Women's Full-Contact Kickboxing Medals Table ===
Event	Gold	Silver	Bronze
-48 kg	Olesya Gladkova (Russia)	Veronique Legras (France)	Vania Gusiiska (Bulgaria); Aliya Boranbaeva (Kazakhstan)
-52 kg	Oksana Vasilieva (Russia)	Fatma Akyüz (Germany)	Ivona Roca (Croatia); Mette Solli (Norway)
-56 kg	Lidia Andreeva (Russia)	Barbara Plazzoli (Italy)	Valentina Chevchenko (Kyrgyzstan); Zsuzsanna Szuknai (Hungary)
-60 kg	Anna Kasprzak (Poland)	Julia Nemtsova (Russia)	Helene Horlaville (France); Nadine Lemke (Germany)
-65 kg	Maria Karlova (Russia)	Alena Fashutdinova (Kyrgyzstan)	Marija Ristovic (Serbia and Montenegro); Csilla Bodo (Hungary)
-70 kg	Karolina Lukasik (Poland)	Heidi Hartmann (Germany)	Marjut Lappalainen (Finland); Nives Radic (Croatia)
+70 kg	Ilhame Aissaoui (Germany)	Irina Smirnova (Russia)	Daniela Lazzareska (North Macedonia); Karen Dews (United Kingdom)

== Light-Contact ==
Light-Contact is a form of kickboxing that is less physical than Full-Contact but more so than Semi-Contact and is often seen as a transition between the two. Contestants score points on the basis of speed and technique over brute force although stoppages can occur, although as with other amateur forms head and body protection must be worn - more detail on Light-Contact rules can be found on the official W.A.K.O. website. The men had nine weight divisions ranging from 57 kg/125.4 lbs to over 94 kg/+206.8 lbs while the women had six ranging from 50 kg/110 lbs to over 70 kg/154 lbs. Though not full of household names there were several previous winners with Dezső Debreczeni, Zoltan Dancso, Szilvia Csicsely and Nadja Sibila having picked up golds at previous events. By the end of the championships Hungary were the strongest nation in the style, winning four gold, two silver and two bronze medals.

=== Men's Light-Contact Kickboxing Medals Table ===
Event	Gold	Silver	Bronze
-57 kg	Dezső Debreczeni (Hungary)	Maxime Aysin (Moldova)	Nikolay Kuznitsov (Russia); Lucien Gross (France)
-63 kg	Jorge Coelho (Germany)	Sándor Szántó (Hungary)	Mickael Guccione (New Caledonia); Danylo Stepanenko (Ukraine)
-69 kg	Marcel Fekonja (Slovenia)	Christian Bauer (Germany)	Christophe Rebrasse (New Caledonia); Vitaliy Yeremenko (Ukraine)
-74 kg	Lionel Picord (France)	Mikhail Sorin (Russia)	Sebastijan Causevic (Slovenia); Oliver Stricz (Hungary)
-79 kg	Zoltan Dancso (Hungary)	Marat Pukhaev (Russia)	Hugo Matos (Portugal); Andrea Primitivi (Italy)
-84 kg	Petr Kotik (Czech Republic)	Andrej Sande (Slovenia)	Mike Béla (Germany); Owen King (United Kingdom)
-89 kg	Uros Urleb (Slovenia)	Juso Prosic (Austria)	Wojciech Myslinski (Poland); Roman Roev (Russia)
-94 kg	Emmanuel Mendy (France)	Michal Wszelak (Poland)	Dmitri Gerasimov (Russia); Agostino Pavesi (Italy)
+94 kg	Uri Abramov (Russia)	Wojciech Szczerbiński (Poland)	Drazen Glavas (Croatia); Dzevad Smajlovic (Bosnia and Herzegovina)

=== Women's Light-Contact Kickboxing Medals Table ===
Event	Gold	Silver	Bronze
-50 kg	Szilvia Csicsely (Hungary)	Anna Krivognza (Russia)	Julita Tkaczyk (Poland); Viktoriya Bezpecna (Ukraine)
-55 kg	Tonje Sørlie (Norway)	Alessia Gaietto (Italy)	Christina McMahon (Republic of Ireland); Joanne Kolowrat (United States)
-60 kg	Klara Marton (Hungary)	Gloria De Bei (Italy)	Kerstin Kössling (Germany); Monika Florek (Poland)
-65 kg	Sanja Stunja (Croatia)	Chiara Mandelli (Italy)	Sabina Sehic (Slovenia); Szilvia Linczmaier (Hungary)
-70 kg	Nusa Rajher (Slovenia)	Ivett Pruzsinszky (Hungary)	Larysa Berezenko (Ukraine); Evelis Boscolo (Italy)
+70 kg	Nadja Sibila (Slovenia)	Oxana Kinakh (Russia)	Giulia Campagno (Italy); Ivana Didovic (Croatia)

== Aero-Kickboxing ==
Aero Kickboxing is a non physical competition, involving participants using a mixture of aerobic and kickboxing techniques in time to specifically selected music. There are no weight divisions like in other forms of kickboxing in W.A.K.O. but there are separate male, female and team categories, with additional events being introduced in Paris, with a male and female 'with (aerobic) step' and 'without (aerobic) step' being added. Also, unlike the contact categories, an individual country was allowed more than one competitor, with the team event even having several teams from the same country. More information on Aero-Kickboxing and the rules can be found on the W.A.K.O. website. Although the Aero-Kickboxing competitions in Paris were not well documented with many of the winners being absent from records, Italy did particularly well, winning three gold and two silver medal.

=== Aero Kickboxing (Men) Medals Table ===
Event	Gold	Silver	Bronze
Aero Individual with Step	No medallist recorded	No medallist recorded	No medallist recorded
Aero Individual without Step	Bruno Manca (Italy)	Daniel Gärtner (Germany)	No medallist recorded

=== Aero Kickboxing (Women) Medals Table ===
Event	Gold	Silver	Bronze
Aero Individual with Step	Laura Fiori (Italy)	Beata Krassoi (Italy)	No medallist recorded
Aero Individual without Step	No medallist recorded	No medallist recorded	No medallist recorded

=== Aero-Kickboxing (Team) Medals Table ===
Event	Gold	Silver	Bronze
Aero Team	Team Italy I	Team Italy II	Team Croatia

== Overall Medals Standing (Top 5) ==
Ranking	Country	Gold (gold)	Silver (silver)	Bronze (bronze)
1	Russia	10	8	5
2	Hungary	4	3	5
3	Italy	3	6	4
4	Germany	3	3	3
5	France	3	1	4

== See also ==
- List of WAKO Amateur World Championships
- List of WAKO Amateur European Championships
