= Mette Solli =

Norwegian kickboxer

Personal information
- Nationality: Norwegian
- Born: 14 September 1974 (age 51) Molde, Norway
Medal record
Women's kickboxing
Representing Norway
World Championships
| Gold medal – first place | 2001 Maribor | Light-Contact -55 kg |
| Gold medal – first place | 2007 Coimbra | Full-Contact -56 kg |
European Championships
| Gold medal – first place | 2004 Budva | Full-Contact -52 kg |

Mette Solli (born 14 September 1974) is a Norwegian kickboxer.

== Biography ==
Solli was born in Molde on 17 September 1974.

Her achievements include gold medal in light-contact at the W.A.K.O. World Championships 2001 (Maribor), a gold medal in full-contact at the W.A.K.O. European Championships 2004 (Budva), and a gold medal in full-contact at the W.A.K.O. World Championships 2007 (Coimbra).

She was awarded the Kongepokal (King's Cup) trophy at the national championships in 2007.
