= W.A.K.O. European Championships 2002 =

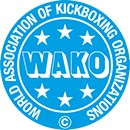
- The poster for W.A.K.O. European Championships 2002
- Promotion: W.A.K.O.
- Date: November 22 (Start); November 27, 2002 (End)
- Venue: Palasport Cornaro
- City: Jesolo, Italy

Event chronology
W.A.K.O. World Championships 2001 (Belgrade)	W.A.K.O. European Championships 2002	W.A.K.O. World Championships 2003 (Paris)

W.A.K.O. European Championships 2002 in Jesolo was the sixteenth European championships to be held by the W.A.K.O. It was the second championship to be held in Jesolo and the seventh (including world championships) to be held in Italy. W.A.K.O. had originally hoped to have a joint event that year like they had with the last world championships, with an event in Greece in October and another in Hungary (and then Slovakia) in November, but due to the difficulties involved they scrapped the idea and resorted to Jesolo which had held a successful event two years previously.

The event was open to amateur men and women from across Europe (with Iran rather unusually participating at a Euro championships) and there were seven styles available; Full Contact, Low-Kick (men only), Thai-Boxing (men only), Light-Contact, Semi-Contact, Musical Forms and Aero-Kickboxing (making its W.A.K.O. debut). Each country was allowed one competitor per weight division in all styles expect Musical Forms and Aero-Kickboxing, although some contestants were allowed to participate in more than one style (mainly the case with Semi and Light-Contact). By the end of the championships Russia was the strongest nation overall, with the hosts Italy in second and Belarus in the third. The event was held over six days in the Palasport Cornaro in Jesolo Italy, beginning on Friday November 22 and ending on Wednesday, November 27th, 2002.

== Full-Contact ==
Full-Contact is a style of kickboxing where punches and kicks are allowed to be thrown by the participants at full force, with strikes below the waist prohibited. Most fights result in a judge’s decision or stoppage victory and as with most other forms of amateur kickboxing, head and various body protection must be worn. More information on Full-Contact and the rules can be found at the official W.A.K.O. website. At Jesolo the men had twelve weight divisions ranging from 51 kg/112.2 lbs to over 91 kg/+200.2 lbs, while the women had seven ranging from 48 kg/105.6 lbs to over 70 kg/+143 lbs. Notable winners included a young Muamer Hukić (more commonly known as the cruiserweight boxing champion Marco Huck) and there were a number of repeat winners from the last world championships in Belgrade with Ramadani Besnik, Fouad Habbani, Olesya Gladkova, Oxana Vassileva, Barbara Plazzoli and Marjut Lappalainen all picking up gold medals. By the end of the championships Russia were easily the top nation in Full-Contact winning eight gold, one silver and two bronze medals.

=== Men's Full-Contact Kickboxing Medals Table ===
Event	Gold	Silver	Bronze
-51 kg	Dmitry Ayzyatulov (Russia)	Francisco Fernandes (Portugal)	Mario Basic (Croatia)
-54 kg	Bruno Manca (Italy)	Andrej Kutlesa (Croatia)	Vardan Sahakyan (Armenia)
-57 kg	Fouad Habbani (France)	Youness Bouignane (Norway)	Boris Klimenko (Russia); Damian Ławniczak (Poland)
-60 kg	Vladimir Pykhtin (Russia)	Michal Tomczykowski (Poland)	Giampaolo Spanu (Italy); Giampaolo Spanu (France)
-63.5 kg	Movsar Kodzoev (Georgia (country))	Malik Mangouchi (France)	Alexandru Pogorelov (Russia); Jere Reinikainen (Finland)
-67 kg	Sergey Uspensky (Russia)	Dietrich Streckert (Germany)	Adriano Ferrari (Italy); Ibrahim Cicek (Turkey)
-71 kg	Rafael Gazayev (Azerbaijan)	Jens Lintow (Germany)	Adam Tutaev (Moldova); Robert Arvai (Hungary)
-75 kg	Ramadani Besnik (Switzerland)	Tomasz Walenski (Poland)	Markus Hakulinen (Finland); Marco Novelli (Italy)
-81 kg	Allan Kotsoev (Russia)	Radev Svetoslav (Bulgaria)	Marcin Rogozik (Poland); Sergei Baranov (Estonia)
-86 kg	Muamer Hukić (Germany)	Yohann Le Maire (France)	Anders Gustavsson (Sweden); Slobodan Marinkovic (Serbia and Montenegro)
-91 kg	Dmitri Guerassimov (Russia)	Maugeri Piero (Italy)	Pavlon Velin (Bulgaria); Sobin Mijo (Croatia)
+91 kg	Duško Basrak (Serbia and Montenegro)	Florentin Pintescu (Romania)	Jimmy Upton (Republic of Ireland); Zsolt Sarosi (Hungary)

=== Women's Full-Contact Kickboxing Medals Table ===
Event	Gold	Silver	Bronze
-48 kg	Olesya Gladkova (Russia)	Veronique Legras (France)	Rita Takacs (Hungary); Cinzia Vargiu (Italy)
-52 kg	Oksana Vasilieva (Russia)	Fatma Akyüz (Germany)	Galina Ivanova (Bulgaria); Mette Solli (Norway)
-56 kg	Barbara Plazzoli (Italy)	Bianca Hermansen (Denmark)	Edyta Olewniczak (Poland); Goranka Blagojevic (Serbia and Montenegro)
-60 kg	Julia Kiblawi (Lebanon)	Milijanka Cenic (Serbia and Montenegro)	Nadine Lemke (Germany); Stina Olsen (Denmark)
-65 kg	Maria Karlova (Russia)	Edith Tati Kiss (Romania)	Deryan Nalkiran (Turkey); Csilla Csejtei (Hungary)
-70 kg	Marjut Lappalainen (Finland)	Siren Soras (Norway)	Ivana Derdic (Croatia); Kiymet Karpuzoglu (Turkey)
+70 kg	Anja Renfordt (Germany)	Galina Ivanova (Russia)	Daniela Lazzareska (North Macedonia); Eleonore Coutelas (France)

== Low-Kick ==
Low-Kick is a style of kickboxing wherein punches and kicks are allowed to be thrown by the participants at full force, only differing from Full-Contact in that kicks to the leg are also allowed. Most fights result in a point's decision or stoppage victory and as with most other forms of amateur kickboxing, head and various body protection must be worn. More information on Low-Kick rules can be found at the W.A.K.O. website. Available to men only there were twelve weight divisions in Jesolo, ranging from 51 kg/112.2 lbs to over 91 kg/+200.2 lbs. While there were few notable winners Evgeniy Khil and Ivan Sočo were double winners having also won gold at the last world championships in Belgrade and future K-1 MAX and SuperLeague fighter Luis Reis won a silver medal. By the championships end Russia was the strongest nation in the style, amassing four golds, three silvers and one bronze.

=== Men's Low-Kick Kickboxing Medals Table ===
Event	Gold	Silver	Bronze
-51 kg	Gianpietro Marceddu (Italy)	Pavel Isinbaev (Russia)	Denis Karyavy (Belarus)
-54 kg	Bodan Marinkovic (Serbia and Montenegro)	Alexander Sidorov (Russia)	Francesco De Luca (Italy); Vardan Sahakyan (Armenia)
-57 kg	Evgeniy Khil (Russia)	Mariusz Cieśliński (Poland)	Gabor Kiss (Hungary); Toni Vegee (France)
-60 kg	Viatcheslav Tislenko (Russia)	Eduard Mammadov (Azerbaijan)	Nikola Petrovic (Serbia and Montenegro); Shkan Kharakhanov (Armenia)
-63.5 kg	Toma Tomov (Bulgaria)	Sami Tomann (Finland)	Nikola Mladenovic (Serbia and Montenegro); Luca Carta (Italy)
-67 kg	Ioussoup Issaev (Russia)	Luis Reis (Portugal)	Franco Lazzaro (Italy); Csaba Molnár (Serbia and Montenegro)
-71 kg	Fouad Ezbiri (France)	Konstantin Beloussov (Russia)	Attila Nagy (Hungary); Milan Cvetkovic (Serbia and Montenegro)
-75 kg	Hrvoje Jukic (Croatia)	Ali Khanjari (Iran)	Akos Panak (Hungary); Stefano Paone (Italy)
-81 kg	Drazenko Ninic (Republika Srpska)	Stjepan Glavica (Croatia)	Mohammed Reza Doudeh (Iran); Dénes Rácz (Hungary)
-86 kg	Dejan Milosavljevic (Serbia and Montenegro)	Gabor Meiszter (Hungary)	Ilko Makshutov (Bulgaria); Teppo Laine (Finland)
-91 kg	Ivan Sočo (Serbia and Montenegro)	Dmitri Vorobjov (Estonia)	Anton Volkov (Russia); Hamza Aouad (Lebanon)
+91 kg	Ruslan Bisaev (Russia)	Dragan Jovanović (Serbia and Montenegro)	Ivica Perkovic (Croatia)

== Thai-Boxing ==
Thai-boxing (more commonly known as Muay Thai is the most physical style of kickboxing in which the contestants use punches, kicks, elbows and knees to attempt to defeat their opponent, often by referee stoppage or via a point's decision. As with other forms of amateur kickboxing, participants must wear head and body protection. At Jesolo the category was open to men only with just nine weight divisions ranging from 57 kg/125.4 lbs to over 91 kg/+200.2 lbs - three down from Belgrade where there were twelve. The lower than anticipated number of contestants can be explained due to the emergency moving of the W.A.K.O. event, originally a joint event, to Jesolo on a weekend which also included two other international amateur Muay Thai events – the I.A.M.T.F. European championships in Portugal and the I.F.M.A. World Championships in Paris. Despite missing some of Europe's top fighters the event had several notable winners in Dmitry Shakuta and Ivan Tolkachev who had won gold at the last world championships in Belgrade, as well as Vasily Shish who like the two mentioned before would win multiple world and European titles. By the end of the event Belarus were easily the top nation in Thai-Boxing winning five golds and one silver.

=== Men's Thai-Boxing Medals Table ===
Event	Gold	Silver	Bronze
-57 kg	Emin Suleymanov (Azerbaijan)	Sergei Shimanski (Belarus)	Vinko Dirlic (Croatia)
-60 kg	Vahidin Tufekcic (Bosnia and Herzegovina)	Paolo Barvero (Italy)	No bronze medallists recorded
-67 kg	Vasily Shish (Belarus)	Nebojsa Denic (Croatia)	Morgan Lundkvist (Sweden); Sergey Zaharchuk (Ukraine)
-71 kg	Kirill Ostrouhov (Belarus)	Ibrahim Zaibak (Palestine)	Raafat Fares (Lebanon); Hassan Ali Mohammadi (Iran)
-75 kg	Dmitry Shakuta (Belarus)	Milan Maljkovic (Serbia and Montenegro)	Kassem Daher (Lebanon); Emilio Mansione (Italy)
-81 kg	Lorenzo Borgomeo (Italy)	Mario Milosavljevic (Serbia and Montenegro)	No bronze medallists recorded
-86 kg	Stanko Pavlovic (Serbia and Montenegro)	Mohamed Zaidan (Lebanon)	No bronze medallists recorded
-91 kg	Ivan Tolkachev (Belarus)	Hasan Mansour (Lebanon)	No bronze medallists recorded
+91 kg	Eduard Voznovich (Belarus)	Milan Rabrenovic (North Macedonia)	Kiril Pendzurov (Bulgaria)

== Light-Contact ==
Light-Contact is a form of kickboxing where points are scored on speed and technique and strikes must be thrown with moderate (not full force). It is less physical than Full-Contact but more so than Semi and is often seen as a transitional stage between the two and as with other forms of amateur kickboxing head and body protection must be worn. More detail on Light-Contact and the rules can be found on the W.A.K.O. website. Both men and women participated in the style with the men having eight weight divisions (one less than at Maribor) ranging from 63 kg/138.6 lbs to over 94 kg/+206.8 lbs while the women had six ranging from 50 kg/110 lbs to over 70 kg/154 lbs. Although not full of recognisable names there were a number of repeat winners at Jesolo with Marcel Pekonja, Zoltan Dancso, Wojciech Szczerbinski, Szilvia Csicsely and Nadja Sibila all having won gold medals at the last world championships in Maribor. By the end of the event Poland was the strongest nation in the style winning five golds, three silvers and two bronze medals.

=== Men's Light-Contact Kickboxing Medals Table ===
Event	Gold	Silver	Bronze
-63 kg	Dmitri Kozlov (Russia)	Chris Collymore (United Kingdom)	Jorge Coelho (Germany); Maciej Dominczak (Poland)
-69 kg	Marcel Fekonja (Slovenia)	Christian Bauer (Germany)	Philipe Schmid (Switzerland); Sead Pejmanovic (Croatia)
-74 kg	Rafal Petertil (Poland)	Mikhail Sorin (Russia)	Oliver Stricz (Hungary); Christian Piras (Switzerland)
-79 kg	Zoltan Dancso (Hungary)	Andrea Primitivi (Italy)	Marat Pukhaev (Russia); Hugo Matos (Portugal)
-84 kg	Martin Albers (Germany)	Bogumil Polonski (Poland)	Marco Tagliaferri (Italy); Vladimir Blagodiyr (Russia)
-89 kg	Wojciech Myslinski (Poland)	Bernd Reichenbach (Germany)	Uros Urleb (Slovenia); Colin O'Shaughnessy (Republic of Ireland)
-94 kg	Michal Wszelak (Poland)	Ivan Caprio (Italy)	Aleksandre Stokovski (North Macedonia)
+94 kg	Wojciech Szczerbiński (Poland)	Drazen Glavas (Croatia)	Yuri Abramov (Russia); Matej Lepenik (Slovenia)

=== Women's Light-Contact Kickboxing Medals Table ===
Event	Gold	Silver	Bronze
-50 kg	Szilvia Csicsely (Hungary)	Julita Tkaczyk (Poland)	Ekaterina Dunbrava (Russia); Mateja Rabotek (Slovenia)
-55 kg	Alessia Gaietto (Italy)	Zaneta Kruk (Poland)	Sabine Seifert (Germany); Christina McMahon (Republic of Ireland)
-60 kg	Julie McHale (Republic of Ireland)	Sonia Biancucci (Italy)	Caiado Funanda (Brazil); Damiris Favre-Rochex (France)
-65 kg	Maike Golzenleuchter (Germany)	Szilvia Linczmayer (Hungary)	Sanja Stunja (Croatia); Helen Barnhard (United Kingdom)
-70 kg	Karolina Lukasik (Poland)	Nusa Rajher (Slovenia)	Sarah Martin (United Kingdom); Pierina Guerreri (Italy)
+70 kg	Nadja Sibila (Slovenia)	Oxana Kikakh (Russia)	Ellen McAllister (United Kingdom); Beata Lawrynowicz (Poland)

== Semi-Contact ==
Semi-Contact is the least physical of the contact kickboxing styles available at W.A.K.O. events. It involves the participants throwing controlled strikes at targets above the waist, with point's scored on the basis of speed and technique with power prohibited. Despite the less physical nature all contestants must wear head and various body protection - more detail on the Semi-Contact and the rules can be found on the official W.A.K.O. website. Both men and women participated in the style with the men having nine weight divisions ranging from 57 kg/125.4 lbs to over 94 kg/+206.8 lbs and the women having six ranging from 50 kg/110 lbs to over 70 kg/154 lbs. Not full of noticeable names there were a number of repeat winners with Dezső Debreczeni, Samantha Aquilano, Luisa Lico and Nadja Sibila all having won gold at the last world championships in Maribor. By the championships end Great Britain were the strongest country in Semi-Contact winning four golds, one silver and one bronze medal.

=== Men's Semi-Contact Kickboxing Medals Table ===
Event	Gold	Silver	Bronze
-57 kg	Dezső Debreczeni (Hungary)	Rolf Leipert (Germany)	Alberto Martini (Italy); Andrzej Maciazek (Poland)
-63 kg	Nico Thommen (Switzerland)	Tomasz Kwasny (Poland)	Roberto Belotti (Italy); Albert Frommel (Austria)
-69 kg	Jacey Cashman (United Kingdom)	Christian Boujibar (Switzerland)	Premyslaw Ziemnicki (Poland); Steven de Block (Belgium)
-74 kg	Roy Baker (Republic of Ireland)	Dimitri Gaulis (Switzerland)	Bjorn Baert (Belgium); Nick Memmos (Greece)
-79 kg	Kurt Baert (Belgium)	Billy Bryce (United Kingdom)	Michel Decian (Switzerland); Neri Stella (Italy)
-84 kg	Sam Timmis (United Kingdom)	Günther Schönrock (Germany)	Igor Kaslek (Slovenia); Emre Cetin (Turkey)
-89 kg	Peter Csikos (Hungary)	Daniel Weil (Germany)	Matej Sibila (Slovenia); Roberto Montuoro (Italy)
-94 kg	Mark Brown (United Kingdom)	Laszlo Toth (Hungary)	Pero Gazilj (Slovenia); Martin Kaiser (Liechtenstein)
+94 kg	Terry Hillman (United Kingdom)	Darragh Geoghegan (Republic of Ireland)	Karl Heinz Kohlbrenner (Germany); Luca Letizia (Italy)

=== Women's Semi-Contact Kickboxing Medals Table ===
Event	Gold	Silver	Bronze
-50 kg	Samantha Aquilano (Italy)	Renate Sandland (Norway)	Katarzyna Nokaw (Poland); Natalia Boulik (Russia)
-55 kg	Monica Compagno (Italy)	Gonca Thurm (Germany)	Julia Trofimova (Russia); Manuela Grobotek (Croatia)
-60 kg	Luisa Lico (Italy)	Brigita Plemenitas (Slovenia)	Damiris Favre-Rochex (France); Caradh O'Donovan (Republic of Ireland)
-65 kg	Cecilia Brækhus (Norway)	Urska Dolinsek (Slovenia)	Gloria de Bei (Italy); Patrizia Berlingieri (Switzerland)
-70 kg	Adriane Doppler (Germany)	Elaine Small (Republic of Ireland)	Anna Migliaccio (Italy); Kelly Gillis (Belgium)
+70 kg	Nadja Sibila (Slovenia)	Nicola Corbett (Republic of Ireland)	Mieke Hink (United Kingdom); Oxana Kinakh (Russia)

== Musical Forms ==
Musical Forms is a non-physical competition which sees the contestants fighting against imaginary foes using Martial Arts techniques - more information on the style can be found on the W.A.K.O. website. The men and women competed in four different styles explained below:

- Hard Styles – coming from Karate and Taekwondo.
- Soft Styles – coming from Kung Fu and Wu-Sha.
- Hard Styles with Weapons – using weapons such as Kama, Sai, Tonfa, Nunchaku, Bō, Katana.
- Soft Styles with Weapons - using weapons such as Naginata, Nunchaku, Tai Chi Chuan Sword, Whip Chain.

Notable winners included Christian Brell, Andrei Roukavistnikov, Sandra Hess and Veronica Dombrovskaya who added to the winners medals they had collected at the last world championships in Maribor, with Dombrovskaya also being a double winner in Musical Forms at Jesolo. By the end of the championships Belarus were the strongest nation in the style, winning three gold medals, one silver and one bronze overall.

=== Men's Musical Forms Medals Table ===
Event	Gold	Silver	Bronze
Hard Styles	Ashley Beck (United Kingdom)	Christian Brell (Germany)	Steffen Bernhardt (Germany)
Soft Styles	Andrei Roukavistnikov (Russia)	Andrey Bosak (Russia)	Castellacci Massimiliano (Italy)
Hard Styles with Weapons	Christian Brell (Germany)	Steffen Bernhardt (Germany)	Ashley Beck (United Kingdom)
Soft Styles with Weapons	Andrey Bosak (Russia)	Andrei Roukavistnikov (Russia)	Michael Moeller (Germany)

=== Women's Musical Forms Medals Table ===
Event	Gold	Silver	Bronze
Hard Styles	Sandra Hess (Germany)	Samantha Smythe (United Kingdom)	Olga Koudinova (Russia)
Soft Styles	Veronica Dombrovskaya (Belarus)	Mariya Pekarchik (Belarus)	Ewa Sliwa (Poland)
Hard Styles with Weapons	Veronica Dombrovskaya (Belarus)	Olga Koudinova (Russia)	Mariya Pekarchik (Belarus)
Soft Styles with Weapons	Mariya Pekarchik (Belarus)	Ekaterina Tchijikova (Russia)	Veronica Dombrovskaya (Russia)

== Aero-Kickboxing ==
Aero-Kickboxing made its debut at a W.A.K.O. championships in Jesolo. Like Musical Forms it is a non physical competition involving aerobic and kickboxing techniques in time to specifically selected music – more information on Aero-Kickboxing and the rule set can be found on the W.A.K.O. website. There were three categories in Jesolo; male, female and a mixed sex team event. By the end of the championships France was the top nation making a clean sweep of all three gold medal positions.

=== Men's Aero-Kickboxing Medals Table ===
Event	Gold	Silver	Bronze
Aero Men	Jean Luc Kitoko (France)	Harald Rainer (Austria)	No bronze medallist recorded

=== Women's Aero-Kickboxing Medals Table ===
Event	Gold	Silver	Bronze
Aero Women	Suzan Aycin (France)	Marina Nikolic (Croatia)	Beata Krassoi (Italy)

=== Aero-Kickboxing (Team) Medals Table ===
Event	Gold	Silver	Bronze
Aero Team	Team France I	Team Italy II	Team Italy I

== Overall Medals Standing (Top 5) ==
Ranking	Country	Gold (gold)	Silver (silver)	Bronze (bronze)
1	Russia	15	10	11
2	Italy	8	6	18
3	Belarus	8	2	2
4	Germany	7	11	6
5	Poland	5	6	9

== See also ==
- List of WAKO Amateur European Championships
- List of WAKO Amateur World Championships
