= W.A.K.O. World Championships 2005 (Agadir) =

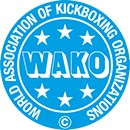
- The poster for W.A.K.O. World Championships 2005 (Agadir)
- Promotion: W.A.K.O.
- Date: 19 September (Start); 25 September 2005 (End)
- Venue: Palais des Sports
- City: Agadir, Morocco
- Attendance: 10,000

Event chronology
W.A.K.O. European Championships 2004 (Maribor)	W.A.K.O. World Championships 2005 (Agadir)	W.A.K.O. World Championships 2005 (Szeged)

W.A.K.O. World Championships 2005 in Agadir were the joint fifteenth world championships held by the W.A.K.O. organization and the first ever to be held in Morocco and the continent of Africa – with the other event to be held later that year in Szeged, Hungary. The championships were open to amateur men and women from across the world, with about roughly 48 countries providing around 350 athletes (although some would be denied Visas), who all attended despite initial fears about potential terrorist attacks.

There were three styles on offer at Agadir; Low-Kick, Thai-Boxing and Musical Forms. The other usual styles (Full/Semi/Light-Contact kickboxing) would be held at the event in Szeged. By the end of the championships regular winners Russia were once again the top nation across all styles, with hosts Morocco doing well in second thanks largely to a great performance in Thai-Boxing, with Belarus way behind in third. The event was held over seven days at the Palais des Sports in Agadir, Morocco, starting on Monday, 19 September and ending Sunday, 25 September 2005 and was watched by around 10,000 spectators.

== Low-Kick ==
Low-Kick is a form of kickboxing where punches and kicks can be thrown at an opponent with full force at legal targets. It is similar to Full-Contact kickboxing only that kicks are also allowed to be made to the opponent's lower legs and thighs. Most fights are won by point's decision victory or via a referee stoppage and as with most forms of amateur kickboxing, suitable head and body protection must be worn. More information on Low-Kick can be found on the official W.A.K.O. website. Both men and women had competitions at Agadir, with the men having twelve weight divisions ranging from 51 kg/112.2 lbs to over 91 kg/+200.2 lbs and the women having seven ranging from 48 kg/105.6 lbs to over 70 kg/+143 lbs. The most notable winner was future K-1 regional and pro world champion Łukasz Jarosz who had also won gold at the last European championships in Budva, while future pro world champions Eduard Mammadov and Michał Głogowski gained podium finishes. Other gold medallists who had also won at Budva included Dmitry Ayzyatulov (Full-Contact), Ruslan Tozliyan, Artur Tozliyan, Dmitri Krasichkov and Dejan Milosavljevic. Russia were easily the strongest country in the style with ten gold, four silver and four bronze across the male and female competitions.

=== Men's Low-Kick Kickboxing Medals Table ===
Event	Gold	Silver	Bronze
-51 kg	Dmitry Ayzyatulov (Russia)	Utkir Hudoyarov (Kyrgyzstan)	Maxim Tulai (Belarus); Abdellah Wargui (Morocco)
-54 kg	Amine Alaoui M'Hamdi (Morocco)	Mohamed Anis Ben Ammar (Tunisia)	Emil Karimov (Azerbaijan); Igor Pavlenko (Ukraine)
-57 kg	Ruslan Tozliyan (Russia)	Mustapha Ben-Sihmed (Morocco)	Zurab Faroyan (Moldova); Faycal Messaoudene (France)
-60 kg	Artur Tozliyan (Russia)	Eduard Mammadov (Azerbaijan)	Medet Abzhanov (Kazakhstan); Anan Brahim (Algeria)
-63.5 kg	Maksut Ibraev (Kazakhstan)	Robert Żytkiewicz (Poland)	Vladimir Pykhtin (Russia); Joao Diogo (Portugal)
-67 kg	Konstantin Sbytov (Russia)	Kabylbek Sadyrbayer (Kazakhstan)	Kumar Jaliev (Kyrgyzstan); Eldin Raonic (Bosnia and Herzegovina)
-71 kg	Ibragim Tamazaev (Russia)	Michał Głogowski (Poland)	Mohamed Diaby (France); Shukhrat Kudaiberdiyev (Kazakhstan)
-75 kg	Konstantin Beloussov (Russia)	Kanatbeck Sidigaliev (Kyrgyzstan)	Dragan Micic (Serbia and Montenegro); Mhiyaodi Azzeddine (Morocco)
-81 kg	Dmitri Krasichkov (Russia)	Drazenko Ninic (Bosnia and Herzegovina)	Dénes Racz (Hungary); Teppo Laine (Finland)
-86 kg	Salko Zildžić (Bosnia and Herzegovina)	Marin Roso (Croatia)	Umberto Lucci (Italy); Gamzat Islamagomedov (Russia)
-91 kg	Dejan Milosavljevic (Serbia and Montenegro)	Dimitri Antonenko (Russia)	Ali Tawfik (Iraq); Nuno Silva (Portugal)
+91 kg	Łukasz Jarosz (Poland)	Dragan Jovanović (Serbia and Montenegro)	Anatoly Borozna (Russia); Salan Hawbeer (Iraq)

=== Women's Low-Kick Kickboxing Medals Table ===
Event	Gold	Silver	Bronze
-48 kg	Sanaa Jah (Morocco)	Anabyeva Svetlana (Russia)	No bronze medallists recorded
-52 kg	Fatima Majdouline (Morocco)	Rita De Angelis (Italy)	Alicia Sahroui (France); Ekaterina Dumbrava (Russia)
-56 kg	Lidia Andreeva (Russia)	Barbara Plazzoli (Italy)	Maria Carmen Romero (Spain); Rim Jouni (Tunisia)
-60 kg	Fatima Bokova (Russia)	Milijanka Cenic (Serbia and Montenegro)	Tereze Lindberg (Sweden); Samira El Halloumi (Morocco)
-65 kg	Mimma Mandolini (Italy)	Olga Zyk (Russia)	Diana Bilyaliva (Kazakhstan)
-70 kg	Vera Avdeev (Russia)	Fatima Bellougadia (Morocco)	Pierina Guerreri (Italy)
+70 kg	Hanaa Nafil (Morocco)	Julia Czernenko (Russia)	No bronze medallists recorded

== Thai-Boxing ==
Thai-Boxing, more commonly known as Muay Thai, is a type of kickboxing that allows the participants to throw punches, kicks, elbows and knees at full force to legal targets on the opponents body. Due to the physical nature of the sport, stoppages are not uncommon, although in amateur Thai-Boxing head and body protection must be worn. At Agadir both men and women took part in the style with the men having twelve weight divisions ranging from 51 kg/112.2 lbs to over 91 kg/+200.2 lbs and the women six, ranging from 52 kg/114.4 lbs to over 70 kg/154 lbs. There were a number of notable faces amongst the medal positions with fighters such as Faldir Chahbari, L'houcine Ouzgni and Sergei Gur all winning medals. Also of note was Djamal Kasumov who moved up in weight to add to the gold medal he had won at the last European championships in Budva. The host nation Morocco were easily the strongest country in Thai-Boxing, winning ten gold, three silver and three bronze medals across the male and female competitions. Regular winners Belarus did very poorly by her standards only picking up one gold as well as a smattering of silver and bronze medals.

=== Men's Thai-Boxing Medals Table ===
Event	Gold	Silver	Bronze
-51 kg	Aithma Abdelhakim (Morocco)	Ivan Bityutskikh (Russia)	Kumar Manis (India); Sergei Skiba (Belarus)
-54 kg	Issam Laafissi (Morocco)	Shamil Abdulzhalilov (Russia)	Giampiero Marceddu (Italy); Karoly Kiss (Hungary)
-57 kg	Eldar Umarakaev (Russia)	Daniel Botella (Spain)	Mostafa El Faresse (Morocco); Javier Sánchez (Ecuador)
-60 kg	Anouar Atigui (Morocco)	Juri Zaukouski (Belarus)	Gennaoliy Papu (Kazakhstan); Arturo Ayala (Spain)
-63.5 kg	Mohamed Ajuau (Morocco)	Michele Iezzi (Italy)	Antonio Garcia (Spain); Mikhail Misin (Russia)
-67 kg	Ilic Milislav (Serbia and Montenegro)	Mahy Cruz (Spain)	Hassan Ait Bassou (Morocco); Aliaksandr Berazouski (Belarus)
-71 kg	Frane Radnić (Croatia)	Faldir Chahbari (Morocco)	Shamil Gaydarbekov (Russia); Muamer Tufekčić (Bosnia and Herzegovina)
-75 kg	Mikhail Chalykh (Russia)	Yuri Karbachou (Belarus)	Krasimir Dimov (Bulgaria); L'houcine Ouzgni (Morocco)
-81 kg	Abdelilah Sarti (Morocco)	Aliaksandr Shlakunov (Belarus)	Salvatore Abate (Italy); Nermin Basovic (Bosnia and Herzegovina)
-86 kg	Yauhen Anhalevich (Belarus)	Mounier Zekhnini (Morocco)	Osman Vagabov (Russia); Riccardo Ginepri (Italy)
-91 kg	Igor Jurković (Croatia)	Alexei Shevtsov (Russia)	Andrei Malchanau (Belarus); Darko Milasinovic (Serbia and Montenegro)
+91 kg	Dzhamal Kasumov (Russia)	Sergei Gur (Belarus)	Kiril Pendirov (Bulgaria); Adnan Redžović (Bosnia and Herzegovina)

=== Women's Thai-Boxing Medals Table ===
Event	Gold	Silver	Bronze
-52 kg	Rajaa Hajdaoui (Morocco)	Maria Krivoshapkina (Russia)	No bronze medallists recorded
-56 kg	Jilia Jelska (Russia)	Mahjouba El Maghraoui (Morocco)	Kristina Karamatić (Croatia)
-60 kg	Fatima Ouahid (Morocco)	Ana Mandic (Croatia)	Sanja Samardzic (Bosnia and Herzegovina); Juliana Werner (Brazil)
-65 kg	Drissia Zahraoui (Morocco)	Nevena Juranovic (Serbia and Montenegro)	No bronze medallists recorded
-70 kg	Salama Nakkab (Morocco)	Nives Radic (Croatia)	No bronze medallists recorded
+70 kg	Samira El Haddad (Morocco)	Albina Vaskeykina (Russia)	No bronze medallists recorded

== Musical Forms ==
Musical Forms is a type of non-physical competition which sees the contestants fighting against imaginary foes using Martial Arts techniques – more information on the style can be found on the W.A.K.O. website. Unlike other styles at Agadir there were no weight divisions only male and female competitions. The men and women at Agadir competed in four different styles explained below:

- Hard Styles – coming from Karate and Taekwondo.
- Soft Styles – coming from Kung Fu and Wu-Sha.
- Hard Styles with Weapons – using weapons such as Kama, Sai, Tonfa, Nunchaku, Bō, Katana.
- Soft Styles with Weapons – using weapons such as Naginata, Nunchaku, Tai Chi Chuan Sword, Whip Chain.

The most notable winners in Musical Forms were Ashley Beck and Veronica Dombrovskaya who won golds medals in two different styles and both having won golds at previous W.A.K.O. championships. By the end of the event the most decorated nation in Musical Forms was Russia who dominated the medal positions by winning three gold, six silver and four bronze medals.

=== Men's Musical Forms Medals Table ===
Event	Gold	Silver	Bronze
Hard Styles	Ashley Beck (United Kingdom)	Michael Moeller (Germany)	Andrei Sawuszkin (Russia)
Soft Styles	Michael Moeller (Germany)	Andrey Bosak (Russia)	Yevgeny Krylov (Russia)
Hard Styles with Weapons	Ashley Beck (United Kingdom)	Andrey Bosak (Russia)	Andrei Sawuszkin (Russia)
Soft Styles with Weapons	Andrey Bosak (Russia)	Andrei Sawuszkin (Russia)	Michael Moeller (Germany)

=== Women's Musical Forms Medals Table ===
Event	Gold	Silver	Bronze
Hard Styles	Olga Koudinova (Russia)	Jessica Holmes (United Kingdom)	Marina Kramarowska (Russia)
Soft Styles	Ekaterina Tchijikova (Russia)	Yelena Czirkowa (Russia)	Clara Bonet Riera (Spain)
Hard Styles with Weapons	Veronica Dombrovskaya (Belarus)	Ekaterina Tchijikova (Russia)	Lora Minicucci (Canada)
Soft Styles with Weapons	Veronica Dombrovskaya (Belarus)	Yelena Czirkowa (Russia)	Clara Bonet Riera (Spain)

== Overall Medals Standing (Top 5) ==
Ranking	Country	Gold (gold)	Silver (silver)	Bronze (bronze)
1	Russia	17	15	11
2	Morocco	14	5	6
3	Belarus	3	4	4
4	Croatia	2	3	1
5	(United Kingdom) Great Britain	2	1	0

== See also ==
- List of WAKO Amateur World Championships
- List of WAKO Amateur European Championships
