= Goran Radonjić =

Montenegrin kickboxer (born 1983)

- Born: Goran Radonjić; February 18, 1983 (age 43); Titograd, Yugoslavia
- Nationality: Montenegrin
- Height: 1.98 m (6 ft 6 in)
- Weight: 110 kg (243 lb; 17 st 5 lb)
- Division: Heavyweight
- Style: Kickboxing
- Stance: Orthodox
- Fighting out of: Podgorica, Montenegro
- Team: Ariston
- Trainer: Predrag Lekić

Kickboxing record
- Total: 37
- Wins: 31
- Losses: 5
- Draws: 1
- Last updated on: October 20, 2012

Goran Radonjić is a Montenegrin heavyweight kickboxer fighting out of Podgorica, Montenegro, captain of Montenegrin kickboxing team.
Radonjić is declared as the best professional Montenegrin kickboxer in 2011 by steering committee of Montenegrin kickboxing federation.

== Biography and career ==
In Arhus, Denmark on March 8. 2008 Radonjić faced Edmoud M'Bullu-Monso, the fight was for vacant World Boxing Council Muaythai International Superheavyweight title. In first two rounds it appeared that Radnonjić would beat Monso with his punch-kick combinations, but Monso's leg kicks, powerful grappling and knees were enough that the fight ends up in his favor. Monso became WBC Muaythai International Champion after five round decision.

After Successful debut in Superkombat where he defeated Frank Muñoz in February 2012, he competed in the SuperKombat World Grand Prix IV 2012, on October 20, 2012, where he was announced to face Fikri Ameziane However, Ameziane pulled out due to injury and was replaced by Răzvan Ghiţă. Ghiţă defeated Radonjić via unanimous decision at the semi-finals.

== Titles ==
Professional

- 2008 WKA Heavyweight European Champion (Low-Kick Rules) +94 kg
- 2007 Dželalija Grand Prix tournament champion (K1 rules)

Amateur

- 2010 W.A.K.O. European Championships in Baku, Azerbaijan (gold) +91 kg
- 2009 W.A.K.O. World Championships 2009 in Villach, Austria (gold) +91 kg
- 2007 8. BIH Open 2007 in Bihać, Bosnia and Herzegovina (gold) +91 kg
- 2006 W.A.K.O. European Championships (bronze) +91 kg
- 2 times W.A.K.O. World Cup winner.

== Kickboxing record (Incomplete) ==
Kickboxing record
Date	Result	Opponent	Event	Location	Method	Round	Time
2015-05-15	Win	(Suriname) Colin George	The Final Fight	Podgorica, Montenegro	Decision (Unanimous)	3	3:00
2012-10-20	Loss	(Romania) Răzvan Ghiţă	Superkombat World Grand Prix IV 2012, Semi Finals	Arad, Romania	Decision (Unanimous)	3	3:00
2012-09-02	Win	(Hungary) Tihamer Brunner	Sarajevo Fight Night 3	Sarajevo, Bosnia and Herzegovina	Decision	3	3:00
2012-02-25	Win	(Spain) Frank Muñoz	Superkombat World Grand Prix I 2012	Podgorica, Montenegro	Decision (Unanimous)	3	3:00
2011-10-22	Win	(Russia) Nadir Gadzhiev	W5 Grand Prix Moscow	Moscow, Russia	Ext.R.Decision	4	3:00
2011-04-17	Loss	(Croatia) Igor Jurkovic	WFC 13: Heavy Hitters	Belgrade, Serbia	Decision	3	3:00
2011-02-12	Win	(Belarus) Alexei Kudin	W5 League	Moscow, Russia	Ext.R.Decision	4	3:00
2010-12-10	Win	(Netherlands) Ricardo Van Den Bos	Podgorica Fight Night	Podgorica, Montenegro	KO	1	2:18
2010-03-21	Draw	(Netherlands) Ismael Londt	K-1 World MAX 2010 West Europe Tournament	Utrecht, Netherlands	Decision draw	3	3:00
2009-12-11	Win	(Greece) Panagiotis Totomis	Splendid Grand Prix	Budva, Montenegro	KO	1
2009-05-26	Win	(Hungary) Gabor Kovacs	Strugar - Zildzic 3	Podgorica, Montenegro	KO (High Kick)	1
2009-01-24	Loss	(Morocco) Aziz Jahjah	Beast of the East 2009	Zutphen, Holland	Decision (Unanimous)	3	3:00
2008-10-05	Win	(Tunisia) Mourad Bouzidi	Tough Is Not Enough	Rotterdam, Netherlands	Decision (Unanimous)	3	3:00
2008-05-24	Win	(Bulgaria) Ivaylo Nikolov		Velenje, Slovenia	TKO	1
Wins WKA Heavyweight European Title (Low-Kick Rules) +94 kg.
2008-03-01	Loss	(Denmark) Ed Monso	International Championship Titles	Arhus, Denmark	Decision (Unanimous)	5	3:00
Fight was for WBC Muaythai International Superheavyweight title.
2007-09-01	Win	(Serbia) Nikola Dimkovski	Night of Thunderman 3, final	Salona, Croatia	Decision (Split)	3	2:00
Won "Dželalija Grand Prix" tournament.
2007-09-01	Win	(Croatia) Elvis Kodžić	Night of Thunderman 3, semi finals	Salona, Croatia	TKO	3
2007-09-01	Win	(Croatia) Igor Mihaljević	Night of Thunderman 3, quarter finals	Salona, Croatia	TKO	1
2003-03-29	Loss	(Croatia) Stipe Glavica	Noć Obračuna 1	Spalato, Croatia	Decision	3	2:00

Amateur kickboxing record
Date	Result	Opponent	Event	Location	Method	Round	Time
2010-10	Win	(Turkey) Hamza Kendircioglu	W.A.K.O European Championships 2010, Low-Kick Final +91 kg	Baku, Azerbaijan
Wins W.A.K.O. European Championship '10 Low-Kick gold Medal +91 kg.
2010-10	WO	(France) German Talbot	W.A.K.O European Championships 2010, Low-Kick Semi Finals +91 kg	Baku, Azerbaijan	WO (No Fight)
2010-10	Win	(Belarus) Yauheni Makarau	W.A.K.O European Championships 2010, Low-Kick Quarter Finals +91 kg	Baku, Azerbaijan
2009-10-26	Win	(Serbia) Dragan Jovanović	W.A.K.O World Championships 2009, Low-Kick Final +91 kg	Villach, Austria	KO (Low Kick)	1
Wins W.A.K.O. World Championship '09 Low-Kick Gold Medal +91 kg.
2009-10-24	Win	(Ukraine) Iuril Gorbenko	W.A.K.O World Championships 2009, Low-Kick Semi Finals +91 kg	Villach, Austria
2009-10	Win		W.A.K.O World Championships 2009, Low-Kick Quarter Finals +91 kg	Villach, Austria
2009-10-23	Win	(Russia) Dilshod Abidzhanov	W.A.K.O World Championships 2009, Low-Kick First Round +91 kg	Villach, Austria	Decision (Unanimous)	3	2:00
2007-04-07	Win	(Bosnia and Herzegovina) Ujkan Todić	8. BIH open 2007, Final +91 kg	Bihać, BIH	Decision (Split)	3	2:00
Wins 8. BIH Open 2007 Gold Medal +91 kg.
2006-11	Loss	(Serbia) Dragan Jovanović	W.A.K.O European Championships 2006, Low-Kick Semi Finals +91 kg	Skopje, Macedonia	Decision (Split)	3	2:00
Wins W.A.K.O. European Championship '06 Low-Kick Bronze Medal +91 kg.
2006-11	Win	(Bosnia and Herzegovina) Sanid Imamović	W.A.K.O European Championships 2006, Low-Kick Quarter Finals +91 kg	Skopje, Macedonia	Decision (Unanimous)	3	2:00

Legend: Win Loss Draw/No contest Notes

== See also ==
- List of WAKO Amateur World Championships
- List of WAKO Amateur European Championships
- List of male kickboxers
