= W.A.K.O. World Championships 2001 (Maribor) =

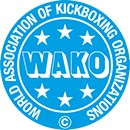
- The poster for W.A.K.O. World Championships 2001 (Maribor)
- Promotion: W.A.K.O.
- Date: 17 October (Start); 23 October 2001 (End)
- City: Maribor, Slovenia

Event chronology
W.A.K.O. European Championships 2000 (Jesolo)	W.A.K.O. World Championships 2001 (Maribor)	W.A.K.O. World Championships 2001 (Belgrade)

W.A.K.O. World Championships 2001 were the joint thirteenth world kickboxing championships (the other was held later that year in Belgrade) hosted by the W.A.K.O. organization. It was the first ever W.A.K.O. championships to be held in Slovenia and involved amateur men and women from across the world. There were three styles on offer at Maribor; Light-Contact, Semi-Contact and Musical Forms – the more physical styles would be available later on in the year at the Belgrade event. By the end of a competitive championships Italy were first in terms of medals won, Germany a close second and Hungary third. The event was held in Maribor, Slovenia over seven days starting on Wednesday, 17 October and ending Tuesday, 23 October.

== Light-Contact ==
Light-Contact is a style of kickboxing which is less physical than Full-Contact but more so than Full and is often seen as a transitional period between the two. The fighters score points through successful striking techniques (thrown with moderate force) with the emphasis on speed and technique although stoppages, though rare, can occur. As with most forms of amateur kickboxing it is mandatory for the participants to wear head and body protection. More information on Light-Contact and be found at the W.A.K.O. website.

Both men and women participated in the style with the men having nine weight divisions ranging from 57 kg/125.4 lbs to over 94 kg/+206.8 lbs while the women had six ranging from 50 kg/110 lbs to over 70 kg/154 lbs. Notable winners included Fouad Habbani, who would go on to make a successful transition to Full-Contact winning gold in Belgrade a few months later, Wojciech Szczerbiński who had won gold at the last world championships in Caorle, and Elaine Fowler and Nadja Sibila who would be double winners as they would win gold medals in Semi-Contact as well. By the end of the championships Hungary were the strongest in Light-Contact winning three golds, two silvers and four bronze.

=== Men's Light-Contact Kickboxing Medals Table ===
Event	Gold	Silver	Bronze
-57 kg	Nikolai Kutznetsov	Tomaz Rogelj	Dezső Debreczeni
-63 kg	Fouad Habbani	Andre Roubert	Maciej Dominczak
-69 kg	Marcel Fekonja	Andreas Dahanyos	Yury Volyanskyy
-74 kg	Besnik Ramadani	Panagiotis Giltidis	Oliver Stricz (Hungary); Rene Kretschmar (Germany)
-79 kg	Zoltan Dancso {	Bogumil Polonski (Poland)	Andrea Primitivi
-84 kg	Tibor Wappel (Hungary)	Marco Tagliaferri	Martin Albers
-89 kg	Dirk Kindl	Andrzej Pniewski	Gábor Meiszter
-94 kg	Marc Franzen	Salem Mohamed	Marco Culiersi
+94 kg	Wojciech Szczerbiński (Poland)	Yuri Abramov (Russia)	Nicola Bertolotti (Italy); Olatuji Assani (United Kingdom)

=== Women's Light-Contact Kickboxing Medals Table ===
Event	Gold	Silver	Bronze
-50 kg	Szilvia Csicsely (Hungary)	Anna Krivoguzova (Russia)	Julita Tkaczyk (Poland); Mateja Rabotek (Slovenia)
-55 kg	Mette Solli (Norway)	Alessia Gaietto (Italy)	Aniko Miklos (Hungary); Daria Chichkina (Russia)
-60 kg	Marzia Davide (Italy)	Agnes Tapai (Hungary)	Leyla Donmez (Germany); Monika Florek (Poland)
-65 kg	Elaine Fowler (Canada)	Maike Golzenleuchter (Germany)	Anna Maria Sisonna (Italy); Fernanda Alvarenga (Brazil)
-70 kg	Birgit Sasse (Germany)	Nusa Rajher (Slovenia)	Karolina Lukasik (Poland); Ivett Pruzsinszky (Italy)
+70 kg	Nadja Sibila (Slovenia)	Kelly Zanini (Italy)	Anja Rendordt (Germany); Beata Lawrynowicz (Poland)

== Semi-Contact ==
Semi-Contact is a style of kickboxing in which only minimal force can be applied to strikes and points are awarded on successfully landing of punches and kicks with the emphasis on speed and technique. Despite the limited physicality of the style all participants most wear head and body protection. More information on Semi-Contact and the rules can be found on the official W.A.K.O. website.

As with Light-Contact the men had nine weight divisions ranging from 57 kg/125.4 lbs to over 94 kg/+206.8 lbs while the women had six ranging from 50 kg/110 lbs to over 70 kg/154 lbs. Notable winners included Marco Culiersi, Samantha Aquilano and Luisa Lico who had all won gold medals at the last world championships in Caorle. Also of note were Elaine Fowler and Nadja Sibila who would become double winners at the same event having also picked up winning medals in their relevant Light-Contact divisions. By the end of the championships Italy were the strongest country in the style by some way, winning six gold medals, two silver and four bronze.

=== Men's Semi-Contact Kickboxing Medals Table ===
Event	Gold	Silver	Bronze
-57 kg	Dezső Debreczeni (Hungary)	Mark Nichols (United Kingdom)	George Memmos (Greece); Andrzej Maciazek (Poland)
-63 kg	Davorin Grabrovec (Slovenia)	Andrea Misiani (Italy)	Vassilios Taipliadis (Greece); Zoltan Angyan (Hungary)
-69 kg	Ilija Salerno (Republic of Ireland)	Christian Meisersik (Turkey)	Sebastian Kristovic (Slovenia); Yevgen Alokhin (Ukraine)
-74 kg	Zvonimir Gribl (Croatia)	Matt Perrins (Canada)	Domenico De Marco (Italy); Andreas Weingartner (Germany)
-79 kg	Daniel Weil (Germany)	Zoltan Dancso (Hungary)	Michel Decian (Switzerland); Neri Stella (Italy)
-84 kg	Emanuele Bozzolani (Italy)	Peter Edwards (United Kingdom)	David Heffernan (Republic of Ireland); Valeriy Orenglo (Ukraine)
-89 kg	Matej Sibila (Slovenia)	Reto von Weissenfluh (Switzerland)	Peter Csikos (Hungary); Pero Gazilj (Croatia)
-94 kg	Giuseppe Fracaroli (Italy)	Owen King (United Kingdom)	Laszlo Toth (Hungary); Aun Andresen (Norway)
+94 kg	Marco Culiersi (Italy)	Mark Brown (United Kingdom)	Karl Heinz Kohlbrenner (Germany); Mesut Celik (Turkey)

=== Women's Semi-Contact Kickboxing Medals Table ===
Event	Gold	Silver	Bronze
-50 kg	Samantha Aquilano (Italy)	Natasa Ilievska (North Macedonia)	Renate Sandland (Norway); Renata Polanec (Slovenia)
-55 kg	Gloria De Bei (Italy)	Christina McMahon (Republic of Ireland)	Gonca Thurm (Germany); Monika Mullerova (Czech Republic)
-60 kg	Luisa Lico (Italy)	Cindy Cote (Canada)	Julie Charlesworth (United Kingdom); Brigita Plemenitas (Slovenia)
-65 kg	Elaine Fowler (Canada)	Anita Madsen (Norway)	Carla Ribeiro (Brazil); Emanuela Amisani (Italy)
-70 kg	Ivett Pruzsinszky (Hungary)	Anna Migliaccio (Italy)	Lenka Klofacova (Czech Republic); Adriane Doppler (Germany)
+70 kg	Nadja Sibila (Slovenia)	Nicola Corbett (Republic of Ireland)	Romina Succi (Italy); Kelly Gillis (Belgium)

== Musical Forms ==
Musical Forms is a non-physical competition which sees the contestants fighting against imaginary foes using Martial Arts techniques – more information on the style can be found on the W.A.K.O. website. The men and women competed in four different styles explained below:

- Hard Styles – coming from Karate and Taekwondo.
- Soft Styles – coming from Kung Fu and Wu-Sha.
- Hard Styles with Weapons – using weapons such as Kama, Sai, Tonfa, Nunchaku, Bō, Katana.
- Soft Styles with Weapons – using weapons such as Naginata, Nunchaku, Tai Chi Chuan Sword, Whip Chain.

The most notable winner was Veronica Dombrovskaya who was a double winner in Musical Forms. By the end of the championships the top nation in Musical Forms was Belarus with three gold medals.

=== Men's Musical Forms Medals Table ===
Event	Gold	Silver	Bronze
Hard Styles	Jean-François Lachapelle (Canada)	Christian Brell (Germany)	Georg Filimonov (Russia)
Soft Styles	Andrei Roukavistnikov (Russia)	Castellacci Massimiliano (Italy)	Paolo Santana (Portugal)
Hard Styles with Weapons	Christian Brell (Germany)	Jean-François Lachapelle (Canada)	Georg Filimonov (Russia)
Soft Styles with Weapons	Georg Filimonov (Russia)	Andrei Roukavistnikov (Russia)	Andreas Seidel (Austria)

=== Women's Musical Forms Medals Table ===
Event	Gold	Silver	Bronze
Hard Styles	Sandra Hess (Germany)	Valeria Smirnova (Russia)	Samantha Smythe (United Kingdom)
Soft Styles	Veronica Dombrovskaya (Belarus)	Svetlana Sorokina (Russia)	Daria Masharo (Belarus)
Hard Styles with Weapons	Veronica Dombrovskaya (Belarus)	Valeria Smirnova (Russia)	Olga Koudinova (Russia)
Soft Styles with Weapons	Daria Masharo (Belarus)	Valeria Smirnova (Russia)	Svetlana Sorokina (Russia)

== Overall Medals Standing (Top 5) ==
Ranking	Country	Gold (gold)	Silver (silver)	Bronze (bronze)
1	Italy	7	6	10
2	Germany	6	2	8
3	Hungary	5	3	7
4	Slovenia	5	2	4
5	Russia	3	7	8

== See also ==
- List of WAKO Amateur World Championships
- List of WAKO Amateur European Championships
