= W.A.K.O. World Championships 2001 (Belgrade) =

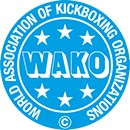
- The poster for W.A.K.O. World Championships 2001 (Belgrade)
- Promotion: W.A.K.O.
- Date: 21 November 2001(start); 25 November 2001 (end)
- City: Belgrade, Serbia and Montenegro

Event chronology
W.A.K.O. World Championships 2001 (Maribor)	W.A.K.O. World Championships 2001 (Belgrade)	W.A.K.O. European Championships 2002

W.A.K.O. World Championships 2001 were the joint thirteenth world kickboxing championships (the other was held earlier that year in Maribor, Slovenia) hosted by the W.A.K.O. organization. It was the second championships to be held in Serbia and Montenegro (the Europeans had been held here back in 1996) and was open to amateur men and women across the world.

There were three styles on offer at Belgrade; Full-Contact, Low-Kick (men only) and Thai-Boxing (men only). The other typical styles, Semi Contact, Musical Forms etc., had taken place at the sister event in Maribor. By the end of the championships Russia was the strongest nation overall, followed by Belarus in second and hosts Serbia and Montenegro in third. The event was held over five days in Belgrade, Serbia and Montenegro, starting on Wednesday, 21 November and finishing on Sunday, 25 November 2001.

== Full-Contact ==
Full-Contact is a form of kickboxing where both punches and kicks are thrown with full force with strikes below the waist prohibited. Most matches are settled by either a point's decision or referee stoppage and like most other amateur contact sports, head and body protection is compulsory. More detail on Full-Contact rules can be found on the W.A.K.O. website. At Belgrade both men and women took part in the style with the men having twelve divisions ranging from 51 kg/112.2 lbs to over 91 kg/+200.2 lbs, and the women had seven ranging from 48 kg/105.6 lbs to over 70 kg/+143 lbs. Notable winners included was Roman Romanchuk who would also have some success in amateur boxing and Fouad Habbani who made the successful transition to Full-Contact having won gold in Light-Contact at Maribor. By the end of the championship Russia was by far the most successful country in the category winning seven golds and six bronzes in both male and female competition.

=== Men's Full-Contact Kickboxing Medals Table ===
Event	Gold	Silver	Bronze
-51 kg	Olleksandr Sasyn (Ukraine)	Francisco Fernandes (Portugal)	Ramin Allahverdiyev (Azerbaijan)
-54 kg	Aleksandr Fedorov (Russia)	Damian Lawniczak (Poland)	Maxim Glubochenko (Ukraine); Lazaros Hatzisavvas (Greece)
-57 kg	Fouad Habbani (France)	Youness Bouignane (Norway)	Eduard Mammadov (Azerbaijan); Pedro Marta (Portugal)
-60 kg	Michal Tomczykowski (Poland)	Bouchaib El Bilali (Morocco)	Vladimir Pykhtin (Russia); Dejan Kekic (Serbia and Montenegro)
-63.5 kg	Malik Mangouchi (France)	Arild Mikalsen (Norway)	Badre Belhaja (Morocco); Danylo Stepanenko (Ukraine)
-67 kg	Ruslan Batrutdinov (Russia)	Mariusz Ziętek (Ukraine)	Krasimiz Gambazor (Bulgaria); Roman Pichuk (Russia)
-71 kg	Robert Nowak (Poland)	Rafael Gazayev (Azerbaijan)	Thomas Kristiansen (Norway); Konstanine Belooussov (Russia)
-75 kg	Ramadani Besnik (Switzerland)	Oleyandr Kirsh (Ukraine)	Tomasz Walenski (Poland); Andreas Papadakis (Greece)
-81 kg	Roman Romanchuk (Russia)	Solobodan Marinkovic (Serbia and Montenegro)	Alessio Rondelli (Italy); Abdelhai Hanine (Morocco)
-86 kg	Yohann Lemaire (France)	Mostapha Lakhsen (Morocco)	Ljubiša Ilić (Serbia and Montenegro); David Bybee (United States)
-91 kg	Stanislav Zemlyakov (Russia)	Sean Collier (Republic of Ireland)	Andriy Ivanov (Bulgaria); Waine Turner (United Kingdom)
+91 kg	Ivan Rudan (Croatia)	Vyacheslav Bednyy (Ukraine)	Florentin Pintescu (Romania); Dmitri Guerassimov (Russia)

=== Women's Full-Contact Kickboxing Medals Table ===
Event	Gold	Silver	Bronze
-48 kg	Olesya Gladkova (Russia)	Veronique Legras (France)	Cinzia Vargiu (Italy); Rita Takacs (Hungary)
-52 kg	Oksana Vasilieva (Russia)	Fatma Akyüz (Germany)	Tatiana Rinaldi (Italy); Aliya Boranbayeva (Kazakhstan)
-56 kg	Barbara Plazzoli (Italy)	Edyta Olewniczak (Poland)	Evguenia Grebenchtchikova (Russia); Goranka Blagojevic (Serbia and Montenegro)
-60 kg	Milijanka Cenic (Serbia and Montenegro)	Monika Florek (Poland)	Julia Nemtsova (Russia); K Amatava (Uzbekistan)
-65 kg	Marjut Lappalainen (Finland)	Bouchara Errahmani (Morocco)	Karolina Lukasik (Poland); Marija Divjak (Serbia and Montenegro)
-70 kg	Olga Slevinskaia (Russia)	Bojaha Trajkovic (Serbia and Montenegro)	No bronze medalists recorded
+70 kg	Kabira Rochai (Morocco)	Izabel Cavka (Croatia)	Daniela Lazarevska (North Macedonia)

== Low-Kick ==
Low-kick is a style of kickboxing which is similar to Full-Contact, allowed strikes (punches and kicks) to be thrown at full force, with the only difference being that strikes are also allowed to the legs of the opponent. Fights are mainly won by a point's decision or by a referee stoppage, with head and body protection mandatory for all contestants. More details on the rules can be found at the W.A.K.O. website. At Belgrade the category was open to men only with twelve weight divisions ranging from 51 kg/112.2 lbs to over 91 kg/+200.2 lbs. The most notable gold medallist was Ivan Strugar who won yet another gold medal (sixth overall) at a W.A.K.O. championships, while future K-1 MAX and Superleague fighters (and brothers) José Reis and Luis Reis won bronze. By the end of the championships the host nation Yugoslavia was the strongest country in Low-Kick winning five gold, one silver and one bronze.

=== Men's Low-Kick Kickboxing Medals Table ===
Event	Gold	Silver	Bronze
-51 kg	Utkir Hudoyarov (Kyrgyzstan)	Mergien Monguch (Russia)	Jozdan Vasslilev (Bulgaria); Shyam Seebaluck (Mauritius)
-54 kg	Milos Anic (Serbia and Montenegro)	Nurlan Valiev (Russia)	Vusal Babayev (Azerbaijan); Mariusz Cieśliński (Poland)
-57 kg	Evgeniy Khil (Russia)	Nicolai Muhailov (Bulgaria)	Mirbel Suiunbajev (Azerbaijan); Gabor Kiss (Hungary)
-60 kg	Nikola Mladenovic (Serbia and Montenegro)	Viatcheslav Tislenko (Russia)	Tahir Duishekeyev (Kyrgyzstan); Saidi El Houssain (Morocco)
-63.5 kg	Milisan Icic (Serbia and Montenegro)	Boughnim El Mostafa (Morocco)	Alexandru Pogorelov (Russia); Alessio Pastifieri (Italy)
-67 kg	Isa Mambetov (Kyrgyzstan)	Ruslan Kovalenko (Ukraine)	Luis Reis (Portugal); Valeri Akinchine (Russia)
-71 kg	Issaev Ioussoup (Russia)	Dmitri Lihodumov (Tajikistan)	Sanjar Saparbekov (Kyrgyzstan); José Reis (Portugal)
-75 kg	Ivan Sočo (Serbia and Montenegro)	Kanatbek Sydygaliev (Kyrgyzstan)	Oleg Outenine (Russia); Anatoliy Dyakov (Ukraine)
-81 kg	Ivan Strugar (Serbia and Montenegro)	Drazenko Ninic (Republika Srpska)	Ali Porsukov (Kyrgyzstan); Abudakar Abakarov (Russia)
-86 kg	Ismailov Magomed (Russia)	Stanko Pavlović (Serbia and Montenegro)	Anuar Ibrayev (Kyrgyzstan); Ilko Makshutov (Bulgaria)
-91 kg	Ante Varnica (Croatia)	Ruslan Azizov (Kyrgyzstan)	Georgi Siderov (Bulgaria); Sergey Sokolov (Ukraine)
+91 kg	Jovan Nikolic (Republika Srpska)	Jasmin Sejdinović (Bosnia and Herzegovina)	Mirko Vlahovic (Serbia and Montenegro); Tugomir Gruica (Croatia)

== Thai-Boxing ==
Thai-boxing (more commonly known as Muay Thai is the most physical style of kickboxing in which the contestants use punches, kicks, elbows and knees to attempt to defeat their opponent, often by referee stoppage or via a point's decision. As with other forms of amateur kickboxing, participants must wear head and body protection. At Belgrade the category was open to men only with twelve weight divisions ranging from 51 kg/112.2 lbs to over 91 kg/+200.2 lbs. Notable winners included Andrei Kulebin winning the first of what would later be many world titles and future It's Showtime 77 MAX world champion Dmitry Shakuta. As with the last world championships Belarus proved to be absolutely dominant once more in Thai-boxing, going one better this time by picking up an incredible nine gold medals.

=== Men's Thai-Boxing Medals Table ===
Event	Gold	Silver	Bronze
-51 kg	Andrei Kulebin (Belarus)	Maxim Slipchenko (Ukraine)	No bronze medalists recorded
-54 kg	Dmitry Koren (Belarus)	Oleg Movchan (Ukraine)	Issam Laafissi (Morocco)
-57 kg	Mohamed Ajuan (Morocco)	Edgar Arutyunyan (Ukraine)	Moghad Eshan Rastegar (Iran); Ahmed Chaikho (Lebanon)
-60 kg	Rachid Boumalek (Morocco)	Dmitry Ouchkanov (Russia)	Oleksiy Neskyy (Ukraine); Kic Brahislav (Serbia and Montenegro)
-63.5 kg	Evgeni Gvozdev (Belarus)	Mourad Tijarti (Morocco)	Celap Hehad (Serbia and Montenegro); Oleksiy Kandalintsev (Ukraine)
-67 kg	Alexei Pekarchik (Belarus)	Shamil Gaydarbekov (Russia)	Pavlo Batsynu (Ukraine); Jakob Szilard (Hungary)
-71 kg	Yuri Bulat (Belarus)	Yevgen Chronobrovtsev (Ukraine)	Namiq Hashimov (Azerbaijan); Dmitry Kurbatov (Russia)
-75 kg	Dmitry Shakuta (Belarus)	Khabib Gadjiev (Russia)	Milan Maljkovic (Serbia and Montenegro); Khalid Hanine (Morocco)
-81 kg	Yauhen Anhalevich (Belarus)	Lorenzo Borgomeo (Italy)	Maksym Kyyk (Ukraine); Raup Izrailov (Russia)
-86 kg	Ivan Tolkachev (Belarus)	Vadym Vlayev (Ukraine)	Domenico Giuliano (Italy)
-91 kg	Andrei Molchanov (Belarus)	Timur Porsukov (Russia)	Jevgeny Evtoshenko (Ukraine); Milan Rabrehovic (Serbia and Montenegro)
+91 kg	Sergei Arkhipov (Ukraine)	Dragan Jovanović (Serbia and Montenegro)	Ivica Perkovic (Croatia); Shammal Gaddgiev (Russia)

== Overall Medals Standing (Top 5) ==
Ranking	Country	Gold (gold)	Silver (silver)	Bronze (bronze)
1	Russia	10	7	13
2	Belarus	9	0	0
3	Serbia and Montenegro	6	4	9
4	Morocco	3	5	5
5	France	3	1	0

== See also ==
- List of WAKO Amateur World Championships
- List of WAKO Amateur European Championships
