= Łukasz Jarosz =

Polish karateka and kickboxer

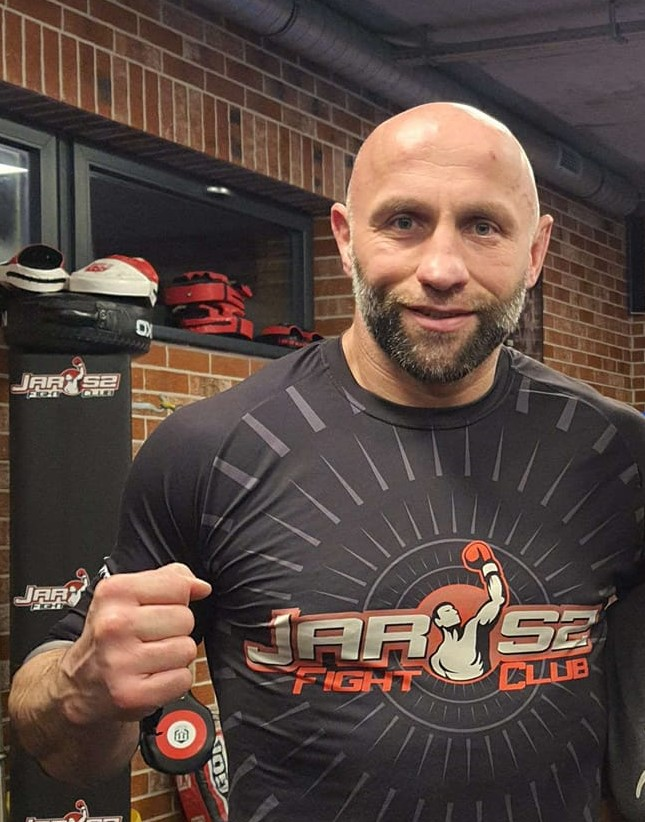
- Born: January 12, 1979 (age 47); Rabka-Zdrój, Poland
- Nationality: (Poland) Polish
- Height: 1.82 m (6 ft 0 in)
- Weight: 100 kg (220 lb; 16 st)
- Division: Heavyweight
- Style: Kickboxing, Kyokushin Karate
- Fighting out of: Nowy Targ, Poland
- Team: Stowarzyszenie Sportów Walki Krokus Nowy Targ, Centrum Szkolenia Sortowego; J&J Kraków
- Trainer: Tomasz Mamulski
- Years active: 2006–present

Kickboxing record
- Total: 45
- Wins: 42
- Losses: 3

Other information
- Website: lukaszjarosz.pl

Łukasz Jarosz (born January 12, 1979) is a Polish heavyweight kickboxer. He is former I.S.K.A. World Super Heavyweight champion.

== Kickboxing career ==
Jarosz was born on January 12, 1979, in Rabka-Zdrój. He fought Ismail Yesil during Thai & Kickboxgala for the ISKA Heavyweight Low Kick title. Jarosz won the fight by a third round KO. He defended the title by a third round TKO of Senad Hadžić in January 2007.

Jarosz took part in the K-1 Poland tournament. He scored a KO win over Daniel Waciakowski in the quarterfinals, and a KO win over Igor Kukurydzyak in the semifinals. He won the tournament by a second round TKO of Marcin Rozalski.

He lost to Aziz Jahjah during the Beast of the East event in May 2008.

Jarosz fought Łukasz Jurkowski in October 2008. He won the fight by a decision.

Łukasz lost to Brian Douwes by a third round TKO during the Beast of the East event.

He was scheduled to fight Michał Olaś during the Beast of the East event. Jarosz won the fight by decision.

Jarosz returned after a nine year layoff to face Michałem Wlazło. He beat Wlazło by TKO in the second round.

In February 2019, Jarosz fought the former Enfusion heavyweight champion Wendell Roche. He won the fight by a unanimous decision.

== Titles ==
=== Professional ===
- 2007 K-1 Rules Heavyweight Tournament in Poland champion
- 2006 I.S.K.A. Low-Kick Rules Super-heavyweight World Champion +96.5 kg (1 title def.)

=== Amateur ===
- 2005 W.A.K.O. World Championships in Agadir, Morocco (gold) +91 kg (low-kick)
- 2004 W.A.K.O. European Championships in Budva, Serbia and Montenegro (gold) +91 kg (low-kick)
- 2003 W.A.K.O. World Championships 2003 in Paris, France (bronze) -91 kg (full-contact)
- 1999 Polish champion in Oyama Karate
- 1998 Polish champion in Oyama Karate
- 1997 Polish champion in Oyama Karate

== Professional kickboxing record ==
Kickboxing record
42 wins, 3 losses, 0 draws, 0 No contests
Date	Result	Opponent	Event	Location	Method	Round	Time
2019-02-24	Win	(Curaçao) Wendell Roche	DSF Kickboxing Challenge 20	Warsaw, Poland	Decision		
2018-05-25	Win	(Poland) Michał Wlazło	Boxing Night 14	Kraków, Poland	Decision (unanimous)	3	3:00
2009-11-14	Win	(Poland) Michał Olaś	Beast of the East	Gdynia, Poland	Decision	3	3:00
2009-05-10	Loss	(Netherlands) Brian Douwes	Angels of Fire V	Płock, Poland	KO (punches)	3	
2008-10-25	Win	(Poland) Łukasz Jurkowski	Maxxx Fight	Warsaw, Poland	Decision (unanimous)	3	3:00
2008-05-31	Loss	(Morocco) Aziz Jahjah	Beast of the east	Zutphen, Netherlands	TKO (referee stoppage)	1	
2008-04-06	Win	(England) Will Riva	K-1 Europe MAX 2008	Warsaw, Poland	KO	2	1:43
2007-06-29	Loss	(Russia) Dzhamal Kasumov	Kickboxing Fighting European Tour 2007, Semi Finals	Martigues, France	Decision	3	3:00
2007-06-29	Win	(Tonga) Paula Mataele	Kickboxing Fighting European Tour 2007, Quarter Finals	Martigues, France	Decision	3	3:00
2007-06-09	Win	(Poland) Marcin Rozalski	K-1 Rules Heavyweight Tournament 2007 in Poland, Final	Nowy Targ, Poland	TKO	2	
Wins K-1 Rules Heavyweight Tournament in Poland title.
2007-06-09	Win	(Ukraine) Igor Kukurydzyak	K-1 Rules Heavyweight Tournament 2007 in Poland, Semi Finals	Nowy Targ, Poland	KO	1	
2007-06-09	Win	(Czech Republic) Daniel Waciakowski	K-1 Rules Heavyweight Tournament 2007 in Poland, Quarter Finals	Nowy Targ, Poland	KO	1	
2007-01-06	Win	(Bosnia and Herzegovina) Senad Hadžić	Night of Glory	Nowy Targ, Poland	TKO	3	
Defends ISKA Low-Kick Rules Super-heavyweight World Championship +96.5kg.
2006-03-11	Win	(Turkey) Ismail Yesil	Thai & Kickboxgala		KO	3	
Wins ISKA Low-Kick Rules Super-heavyweight World Championship +96.5kg.
Legend: Win Loss Draw/no contest Notes

== See also ==
- List of male kickboxers
