= Hafiz Bakhshaliyev =

Azerbaijani kickboxer

- Born: Hafiz Baxşəliyev; April 1, 1980 (age 46); Nakhchivan, Azerbaijan SSR
- Died: -
- Nationality: Azerbaijani
- Weight: 91 kg (201 lb; 14 st 5 lb)
- Division: Heavyweight
- Style: Kickboxing
- Fighting out of: Baku, Azerbaijan

Other information
- Spouse: Lamiya Bakhshaliyeva
- Children: Omar Pasha (son), Miriam Pasha (daughter)

Hafiz Bakhshaliyev (Azerbaijani: Hafiz Baxşəliyev) (1 April 1980, Nakhchivan, Azerbaijan SSR) is an Azerbaijani athlete, European and World Kick Boxing Champion. He is a former three times World Association of Kickboxing Organizations World Heavyweight Low Kick Champion.

== Early life and education ==
Hafiz Bakhshaliyev was born on 1 April 1980 in Nakhchivan, Azerbaijan SSR. In 1996, he completed his secondary education in Nakhchivan. In 1996, he entered Tafakkur University and graduated in 2000 with a degree in Economy. From 2000 through 2001, Bakhshaliyev served in the Azerbaijani Armed Forces.

== Kickboxing career ==
Bakhshaliyev started his Kickboxing career in 1997. In -91 kg/201 lb tournament he represented Azerbaijan in international competitions. Over the years he has been a gold, silver and bronze medalist in the World and European championships. In 2007, Bakhshaliyev represented Azerbaijan for the first time in professional K-1 competitions.

In 2005, he started the "Россия против Мир" professional kickboxing competition among the most powerful athletes of the world and was the only one who defeated the Russian kick boxer during the whole competition.

He lives in London since 2009. Though Bakhshaliyev retired from the sport in 2011, he decided to fight again in 2017.

Bakhshaliyev defeated Spanish athlete Ismail Bergman with a knockdown for the title of the Interprofessional European Champion in Cardiff, Wales and won the European belt in the UK. Bakhshaliyev often participates in sport competitions and events of Azerbaijani diaspora on Karabakh and Azerbaijan. He established The Union of Azerbaijani Athletes Living Abroad with Elnur Elturk, who is the Head of the Department of Free Electronic Resources in the Central Library of Science of Azerbaijan National Academy of Sciences.

== Titles and accomplishments ==
- Seven times Azerbaijani Champion
- 2010 - British Champion
- 2004, 2006, 2008 - World Champion
- 2003, 2008, 2017 - European Champion

== See also ==
- List of WAKO Amateur European Championships
- List of WAKO Amateur World Championships
- List of male kickboxers
