= Eduard Mammadov =

Azerbaijani kickboxer

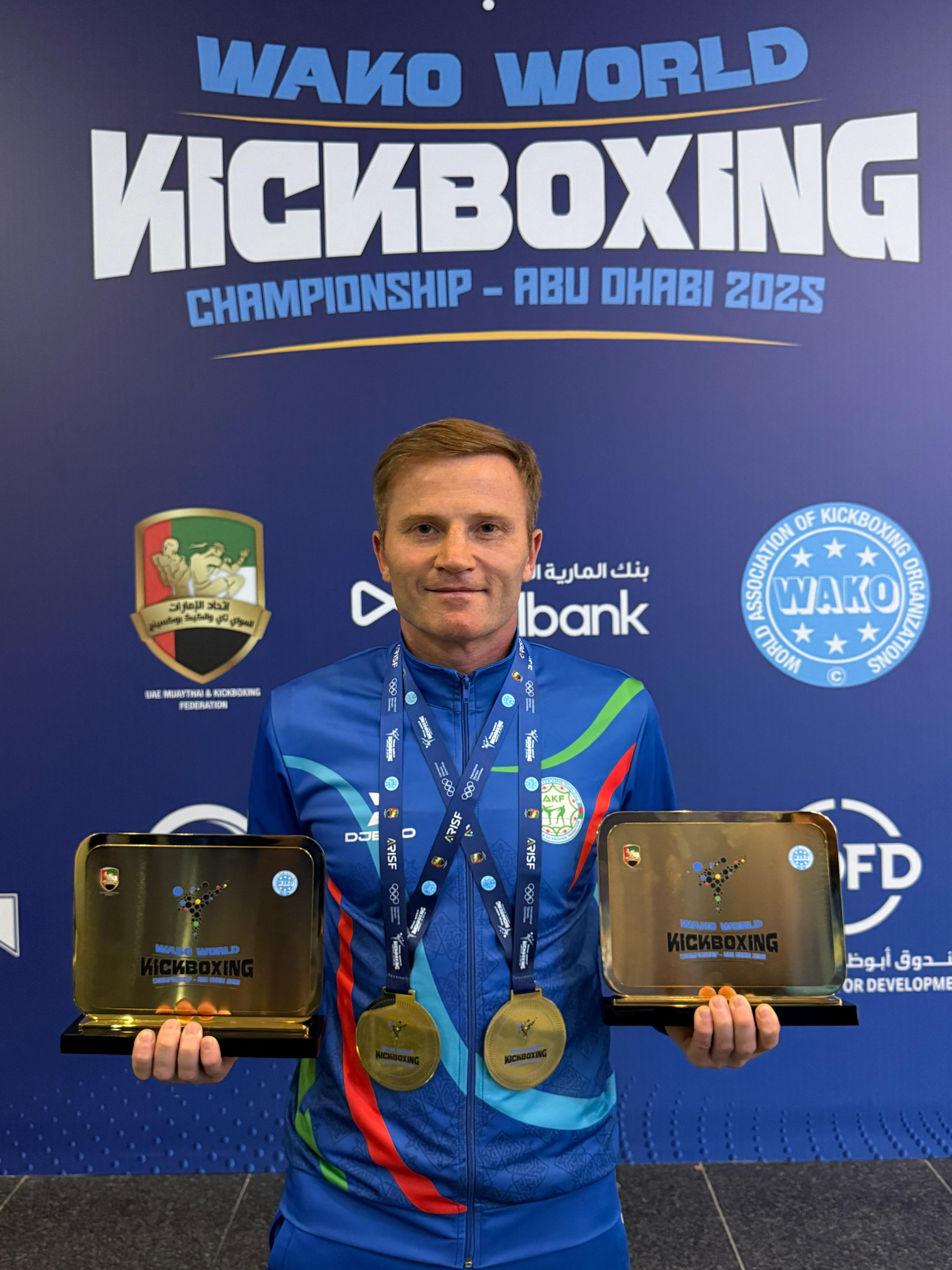
- Born: Eduard Tofig oglu Mammadov; January 2, 1978 (age 48); Baku, Azerbaijan SSR, Soviet Union
- Other names: White Wolf
- Nationality: (Azerbaijan) Azerbaijani
- Height: 1.70 m (5 ft 7 in)
- Weight: 63 kg (139 lb; 9.9 st)
- Division: Welterweight
- Style: Kickboxing
- Trainer: Chingiz Eyvazov
- Years active: 1993–present

Other information
- Occupation: Coach
- University: State Academy of Physical Training and Sports of Azerbaijan

Eduard Mammadov (born January 2, 1978, in Baku) is an Azerbaijani professional kickboxer nicknamed "White Wolf", 30-time world champion, 13-time European champion, 11-time world cup holder, 15-time Azerbaijani champion, Asian and Eurasian champion, world champion among professionals, owner of the WAKO version of the intercontinental belt among professionals, professionals among them are the owner of the IKBO version of the world belt, honored master of sports, honored coach, Honorary Physical Education and Sports Worker of the Republic of Azerbaijan, deputy chairman of the Board of Directors of the Azerbaijan Kickboxing Federation, Assistant to the Head Coach of the National Team, Head of the Sports and Training Department of the Sports Society of the Ministry of Internal Affairs, police colonel. Vice President of the Azerbaijan Kickboxing Federation.

== Kickboxing career ==
Mammadov started his professional kickboxing career in 1993 and since then won all Azerbaijani Kickboxing Championship titles.

In November 2026, Eduard Mamedov won two gold medals at the WAKO European Kickboxing Championship in Skopje.

== Coaching career ==
He started his coaching career in 2000 and currently working as kickboxing coach in local school.

== Titles ==
Eduard has won 25 world titles, 7 European titles and been champion of Azerbaijan 15 times.

Professional

- W.A.K.O Pro world champion

Amateur

- 2009 W.P.K.A. World Championships in Madrid, Spain (gold) -60 kg (K-1 Rules)
- 2009 W.P.K.A. World Championships in Madrid, Spain (gold) -60 kg (Low-Kick)
- 2007 W.A.K.O. World Championships in Coimbra, Portugal (silver) -60 kg (Full-Contact)
- 2007 W.A.K.O. World Championships in Belgrade, Serbia (silver) -60 kg (Low-Kick)
- 2006 W.A.K.O. European Championships in Skopje, Macedonia (gold) -60 kg (Low-Kick)
- 2005 W.A.K.O. World Championships in Agadir, Morocco (silver) -60 kg (Low-Kick)
- 2002 W.A.K.O. European Championships in Jesolo, Italy (silver) -60 kg (Low-Kick)
- 2001 W.A.K.O. World Championships in Belgrade, Serbia & Montenegro (bronze) -57 kg (Full-Contact)

== See also ==
- List of heavyweight boxing champions
- List of male kickboxers
