= W.A.K.O. European Championships 2006 (Skopje) =

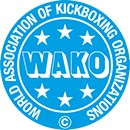
- The poster for W.A.K.O. European Championships 2006 (Skopje)
- Promotion: W.A.K.O.
- Date: 21 November 2006 (start); 26 November 2006 (end)
- City: (North Macedonia) Skopje, Republic of Macedonia

Event chronology
| W.A.K.O. European Championships 2006 (Lisbon) | W.A.K.O. European Championships 2006 (Skopje) | W.A.K.O. World Championships 2007 (Belgrade) |

W.A.K.O. European Championships 2006 in Skopje were the joint eighteenth European kickboxing championships held by the W.A.K.O. organization (the other event was held the previous month in Lisbon). It was the first event to be held in the country of Republic of Macedonia and was organized by the nation's kickboxing president Ljupčo Nedelkovski, involving (mainly) amateur men and women from 31 countries across Europe.

There were three styles on offer at Skopje; Low-Kick, Thai-Boxing and Light-Contact. The other usual W.A.K.O. styles (Full/Semi Contact, Aero-Kickboxing and Musical Forms) were held at the earlier event in Lisbon. By the end of the championships Russia were easily the strongest country overall with a massive medals tally with Belarus came a distant second and Serbia not far behind in third place. The event was held in Skopje, Macedonia over six days, beginning on Tuesday 21 November and ending 26 November 2006.

== Participating nations ==
There were around 31 nations from across Europe participating at the 2006 W.A.K.O. European Championships in Skopje including:

- Austria
- Azerbaijan
- Belarus
- Bulgaria
- Bosnia and Herzegovina
- Croatia
- Denmark
- Estonia
- Finland
- France
- Germany
- (United Kingdom) Great Britain
- Hungary
- (Republic of Ireland) Ireland
- Israel
- Italy
- (North Macedonia) Macedonia
- Montenegro
- Norway
- Poland
- Portugal
- Romania
- Russia
- Serbia
- Slovakia
- Slovenia
- Spain
- Sweden
- Switzerland
- Turkey
- Ukraine

== Low-Kick ==
Similar to Full-Contact kickboxing, contestants in Low-Kick are allowed to kick and punch one another with full force, with the primary difference being that in Low-Kick they are also allowed to kick one another's legs, with matches typically won by decision or stoppage. As with other forms of amateur kickboxing, various head and body protection must be worn. More information on the style can be found at the W.A.K.O. website. Both men and women took part in Low-Kick at Skopje, with the men having twelve weight divisions ranging from 51 kg/112.2 lbs to over 91 kg/+200.2 lbs, and then women having six ranging from 48 kg/105.6 lbs to 70 kg/154 lbs and unlike more recent W.A.K.O. championships (aside from Lisbon) some countries were allowed more than one athlete per weight division.

Notable winners in the category included Zurab Faroyan picking up his 4th gold medal in a row, which included winning in Full-Contact at the other European championships in Lisbon a month or so previously, while countryman Konstantin Sbytov picked up his 3rd gold medal. Other winners included multiple world champion Eduard Mammadov and Ibragim Tamazaev who had won at the last world championships in Agadir. Also in medal positions and more recognisable to western and international audiences were Michał Głogowski, Ludovic Millet and Mickael Lallemand who all won bronze medals. Russia continued her tradition of being the strongest nation in Low-Kick, easily dominating the medal positions with twelve gold, four silver and eight bronze.

=== Men's Low-Kick Kickboxing Medals Table ===
| Event | Gold | Silver | Bronze |
|---|---|---|---|
| Light Bantamweight -51 kg | Aleksandar Aleksandrov (Russia) | Nijat Huseynov (Azerbaijan) | Rasim Aliti (North Macedonia); Afanasiev Klimeni (Russia) |
| Bantamweight -54 kg | Jordan Vasilev (Bulgaria) | Emil Karimov (Azerbaijan) | Boban Marinkovic (Serbia); Mokhmad Betmirzaev (Russia) |
| Featherweight -57 kg | Zurab Faroyan (Russia) | Milos Anic (Serbia) | Gabor Kiss (Hungary); Mariusz Cieśliński (Poland) |
| Lightweight -60 kg | Eduard Mammadov (Azerbaijan) | Dzianis Tselitsa (Belarus) | Alikhan Chumaev (Russia); Grigory Gorokhov (Russia) |
| Light Welterweight -63.5 kg | Artur Magadov (Russia) | Ayoub Saidi (Denmark) | Gleb Bozko (Estonia); Kurbanali Akaev (Russia) |
| Welterweight -67 kg | Nikolai Shtakhanov (Russia) | Evgeny Grechishkin (Russia) | Venelin Iankov (Bulgaria); Mickael Lallemand (France) |
| Light Middleweight -71 kg | Konstantin Sbytov (Russia) | Milan Dragojlovic (Serbia) | Michał Głogowski (Poland); Ludovic Millet (France) |
| Middleweight -75 kg | Ibragim Tamazaev (Russia) | Dragan Mićić (Serbia) | Leszek Koltun (Poland); Stelian Angelov (Bulgaria) |
| Light Heavyweight -81 kg | Nenad Pagonis (Serbia) | Drazenko Ninic (Bosnia and Herzegovina) | Rail Rajabov (Azerbaijan); Teppo Laine (Finland) |
| Cruiserweight -86 kg | Kirill Ivanov (Russia) | Stipe Stipetic (Croatia) | Dilian Slavov (Bulgaria); Vladimir Djordjevic (Serbia) |
| Heavyweight -91 kg | Dimitri Antonenko (Russia) | Dejan Milosavljevic (Serbia) | Sasa Cirovic (Serbia); Ivan Stanić (Croatia) |
| Super Heavyweight +91 kg | Dragan Jovanović (Serbia) | Hafiz Bakhshaliyev (Azerbaijan) | Goran Radonjic (Montenegro); Jan Antoska (Slovakia) |

=== Women's Low-Kick Kickboxing Medals Table ===
| Event | Gold | Silver | Bronze |
|---|---|---|---|
| Bantamweight -48 kg | Anabyeva Svetlana (Russia) | Ekateruba Verzhbitskaya (Russia) | Corina Carlescu (Romania); Zeljana Pitesa (Croatia) |
| Featherweight -52 kg | Maria Krivoshapkina (Russia) | Ekaterina Dumbrava (Russia) | Vira Makresova (Ukraine); Eva Ott (Hungary) |
| Lightweight -56 kg | Milena Dincic (Serbia) | Maryna Batsman (Ukraine) | Arsalane Ahlam (France); Lidia Andreeva (Russia) |
| Middleweight -60 kg | Barbara Plazzoli (Italy) | Milijanka Cenic (Serbia) | Olga Zyk (Russia); Fatima Bokova (Russia) |
| Light Heavyweight -65 kg | Vera Avdeeva (Russia) | Mimma Mandolini (Italy) | Jelena Juric (Serbia); Maja Djukanovic (Serbia) |
| Heavyweight -70 kg | Svetlana Kulakova (Russia) | Elena Kondratyeva (Russia) | Olivera Milanovic (Serbia); Nataša Ivetić (Serbia) |
| Super Heavyweight +70 kg | Natalija Simac (Croatia) | Daniela Lazarevska (North Macedonia) | No bronze medallists recorded |

== Thai-Boxing ==
Thai-Boxing, more commonly known as Muay Thai, is a type of kickboxing that allows the participants to throw punches, kicks, elbows and knees at full force to legal targets on the opponents body. Due to the physical nature of the sport, stoppages are not uncommon, although in amateur Thai-Boxing head and body protection must be worn. At Skopje both men and women took part in the style with the men having twelve weight divisions ranging from 51 kg/112.2 lbs to over 91 kg/+200.2 lbs and the women six, ranging from 52 kg/114.4 lbs to over 70 kg/154 lbs and unlike more recent W.A.K.O. championships (aside from Lisbon) some countries were allowed more than one athlete per weight division.

There were not too many recognisable winners in Thai-Boxing at Skopje although Vitaly Gurkov had won a number of amateur world championships with various organizations prior to this event and would go on to win a K-1 regional tournament as a pro. By the end of the championships Russia finally overhauled the dominance of Belarus in the style, coming out top with six gold, seven silver and seven bronze medals.

=== Men's Thai-Boxing Medals Table ===
| Event | Gold | Silver | Bronze |
|---|---|---|---|
| Light Bantamweight -51 kg | Giampiero Marceddu (Italy) | Siarhei Skiba (Belarus) | Andrey Mikhaylov (Russia) |
| Bantamweight -54 kg | Maksym Glubochenko (Ukraine) | Goran Mimica (Croatia) | Andrea Molon (Italy) |
| Featherweight -57 kg | Aleksandar Gogic (Serbia) | Ruben Almedia (Portugal) | Ramil Novruzov (Belarus); Ilya Mordvinov (Russia) |
| Lightweight -60 kg | Pashik Tatoyan (Russia) | Bahtiyar Iskanderzade (Azerbaijan) | Gor Shavelyan (Russia); Aleksandar Jankovic (Serbia) |
| Light Welterweight -63.5 kg | Yury Zhvokovski (Belarus) | Sergey Solomennokov (Russia) | Stanislav Ushakov (Russia); Michele Iezzi (Italy) |
| Welterweight -67 kg | Vitaly Gurkov (Belarus) | Nikolay Bubnov (Russia) | Mikhail Mishin (Russia); Nebojsa Denic (Serbia) |
| Light Middleweight -71 kg | Denis Dikusar (Russia) | Rizvan Isaev (Russia) | Ile Risteski (North Macedonia); Milos Mihaljevic (Serbia) |
| Middleweight -75 kg | Yury Harbachov (Belarus) | Mikhail Chalykh (Russia) | Kamel Mezatni (France); Aleksandre Stajkovski (North Macedonia) |
| Light Heavyweight -81 kg | Dzianis Hancharonak (Belarus) | Ivan Damianov (Bulgaria) | Dmytro Kirpan (Ukraine); Arpad Forgon (Hungary) |
| Cruiserweight -86 kg | Maxim Vinogradov (Russia) | Aly Staubmann (Austria) | Siarhei Krauchanka (Belarus); Zaur Alekporov (Azerbaijan) |
| Heavyweight -91 kg | Kiril Pendjurov (Bulgaria) | Atanas Stojkovski (North Macedonia) | Alexey Shevtsov (Russia); Igor Jurković (Croatia) |
| Super Heavyweight +91 kg | Alexey Kudin (Belarus) | Valentino Venturini (Croatia) | Mirko Vlahović (Montenegro); Mladen Bozic (Serbia) |

=== Women's Thai-Boxing Medals Table ===
| Event | Gold | Silver | Bronze |
|---|---|---|---|
| Bantamweight -48 kg | Anna Kozelkova (Russia) | Viktoria Ageeva (Russia) | Anett Urban (Hungary) |
| Featherweight -52 kg | Petra Buchenberger (Hungary) | Alisa Chukhnina (Russia) | Kristina Karamatic (Croatia); Adi Rotem (Israel) |
| Lightweight -56 kg | Irma Balijagic (Bosnia and Herzegovina) | Barbara Vlahov (Croatia) | No bronze medallists recorded |
| Middleweight -60 kg | Natalya Kamenskikh (Russia) | Ana Mandic (Croatia) | Panu Donatella (Italy); Sanja Samardzic (Bosnia and Herzegovina) |
| Light Heavyweight -65 kg | Elena Solareva (Russia) | Lejla Osmani (North Macedonia) | No bronze medallists recorded |
| Heavyweight -70 kg | Nives Radic (Croatia) | Ekaterina Rokunova (Russia) | Tatiana Ovchinnikova (Russia) |

== Light-Contact ==
Light-Contact is a form of kickboxing that is less physical than Full-Contact but more so than Semi-Contact and is often seen as a transition between the two. Contestants score points on the basis of speed and technique over brute force although stoppages can occur, although as with other amateur forms head and body protection must be worn – more detail on Light-Contact rules can be found on the official W.A.K.O. website. The men had nine weight divisions ranging from 57 kg/125.4 lbs to over 94 kg/+206.8 lbs while the women had six ranging from 50 kg/110 lbs to over 70 kg/154 lbs and unlike more recent W.A.K.O. championships (aside from Lisbon) some countries were allowed more than one athlete per weight division.

As it is often in the shadow of the full contact styles there were not many familiar faces in Light-Contact although Dezső Debreczeni, who is a regular winner in Light and Semi-Contact, won another gold medal. By the end of the championships Hungary prevented Russia from being top in all three styles at Skopje by winning three golds, two silvers and three bronze.

=== Men's Light-Contact Kickboxing Medals Table ===
| Event | Gold | Silver | Bronze |
|---|---|---|---|
| -57 kg | Dezső Debreczeni (Hungary) | Maxim Aysin (Russia) | Fabien Saby (France); Artur Novikov (Russia) |
| -63 kg | Konstyantyn Demoretskyy (Ukraine) | Mikhail Gerasimov (Russia) | Kamel Bacha (France); Stanislav Petrov (Bulgaria) |
| -69 kg | Przemysław Ziemnicki (Poland) | Danir Yusupov (Russia) | Zsolt Nagy (Hungary); Juraj Hoppan (Slovakia) |
| -74 kg | Toby Bemuller (Republic of Ireland) | Sergey Faretov (Russia) | Artem Noskov (Ukraine); Attila Olasz (Hungary) |
| -79 kg | Stefan Bücker (Germany) | Zoltan Dancso (Hungary) | Christophe Touzeau (France); Bernhard Sussitz (Austria) |
| -84 kg | Duane Reid (United Kingdom) | Murat Pukhaev (Russia) | Rainer Gerdenitsch (Austria); David Nagode (Slovenia) |
| -89 kg | Gavin Williamson (United Kingdom) | Mattia Bezzon (Italy) | Artem Vasylenko (Ukraine); Berislav Budiscak (Croatia) |
| -94 kg | Giovanni Nurchi (Germany) | Mikael Bäckström (Sweden) | Tibor Wappel (Hungary); Emin Panyan (Russia) |
| +94 kg | Michal Wszelak (Poland) | Merlin Gehrt (Germany) | Konstantin Kuleshov (Russia); Cristian Lubrano (Italy) |

=== Women's Light-Contact Kickboxing Medals Table ===
| Event | Gold | Silver | Bronze |
|---|---|---|---|
| -50 kg | Fatima Zaaboula (France) | Reka Krempf (Hungary) | Therese Gunnarsson (Sweden); Alexandra Kibanova (Russia) |
| -55 kg | Maria Kushtanova (Russia) | Zaneta Ciesla (Poland) | Andriana Tricoli (Italy); Roxana Lasak (France) |
| -60 kg | Julie McHale (Republic of Ireland) | Katarina Ilicic (Croatia) | Tamara Radkovic (Slovenia); Maria Antonietta Lovicu (Italy) |
| -65 kg | Marta Fenyvesi (Hungary) | Katarzyna Furmaniak (Poland) | Sabina Sehic (Slovenia); Nicole Trimmel (Austria) |
| -70 kg | Ivett Pruzsinszky (Hungary) | Lariza Brezenko (Ukraine) | Annalisa Ghilardi (Italy); Kate Kearney (United Kingdom) |
| +70 kg | Oxana Kinakh (Russia) | Paulina Biec (Poland) | Zeliha Doğrugüneş (Turkey); Sabine Schnell (Germany) |

== Overall Medals Standing (Top 5) ==
| Ranking | Country | Gold (gold) | Silver (silver) | Bronze (bronze) |
|---|---|---|---|---|
| 1 | Russia | 20 | 16 | 19 |
| 2 | Belarus | 5 | 2 | 2 |
| 3 | Serbia | 4 | 5 | 11 |
| 4 | Hungary | 4 | 2 | 7 |
| 5 | Italy | 2 | 2 | 7 |

== See also ==
- List of WAKO Amateur European Championships
- List of WAKO Amateur World Championships
