= Men's Low-Kick at WAKO World Championships 2007 Belgrade -63.5 kg =

The men's light welterweight (63.5 kg/139.7 lbs) Low-Kick category at the W.A.K.O. World Championships 2007 in Belgrade was the fifth lightest of the male Low-Kick tournaments, involving twenty-two fighters from three continents (Europe, Asia and Africa). Each of the matches was three rounds of two minutes each and were fought under Low-Kick rules.

Due to the fact there were too few fighters for a thirty-two man tournament, ten of the fighters had byes through to the second round. The tournament gold medalist was Artur Magadov from Russia who defeated the Moroccan Soufiane Zridy by unanimous decision in the final. Defeated semi finalists Mihajio Jovanovic from Serbia and Mirlan Ibraimov from Kyrgyzstan had to make do with bronze medals.

== Results ==
1st Round
(Azerbaijan) Tural Rzayen
(Morocco) Soufiane Zridy	D(3:0)
(Spain) Aitor Eguzkiza	D(3:0)
(Bosnia and Herzegovina) Vedad Mulaomerovic
(Egypt) Ahmed Hassan
(Serbia) Mihajio Jovanovic	D(3:0)
(France) Cedrick Peynaud
(Italy) Marco De Paolis	D(3:0)
(Belarus) Yury Zhukouski
(Turkey) Muammer Efe	D(2:1)
(Sweden) Daniel Karlsson
(Bulgaria) Nikola Nikolav	KO

2nd Round
(Portugal) Joao Diogo	D(3:0)
(Croatia) Ivan Stupalo
(Iran) Amir Zanjani
(Morocco) Soufiane Zridy	D(3:0)
(Iraq) Salan Najm
(Spain) Aitor Eguzkiza	D(3:0)
(India) Sashi Prakash
(Serbia) Mihajio Jovanovic	D(3:0)
(Greece) Athanasios Karagos
(Italy) Marco De Paolis	D(3:0)
(Kyrgyzstan) Mirlan Ibraimov	D(3:0)
(Turkey) Muammer Efe
(Poland) Kamil Dajwlowski
(Bulgaria) Nikola Nikolav	D(3:0)
(Kazakhstan) Yersain Kassambayev
(Russia) Artur Magadov	D(2:1)

Quarter Finals
(Portugal) Joao Diogo
(Morocco) Soufiane Zridy	KO
(Spain) Aitor Eguzkiza
(Serbia) Mihajio Jovanovic	D(2:1)
(Italy) Marco De Paolis
(Kyrgyzstan) Mirlan Ibraimov	D(2:1)
(Bulgaria) Nikola Nikolav
(Russia) Artur Magadov	TKO

Semi Finals
(Morocco) Soufiane Zridy	D(2:1)
(Serbia) Mihajio Jovanovic
(Kyrgyzstan) Mirlan Ibraimov
(Russia) Artur Magadov	D(3:0)

Final
(Morocco) Soufiane Zridy
(Russia) Artur Magadov	D(3:0)

=== Key ===
Abbreviation	Meaning
D (3:0)	Decision (Unanimous)
D (2:1)	Decision (Split)
KO	Knockout
TKO	Technical Knockout

== See also ==
- List of WAKO Amateur World Championships
- List of WAKO Amateur European Championships
- List of male kickboxers
