= Men's Light-Contact at WAKO World Championships 2007 Belgrade -74 kg =

The men's 74 kg (162.8 lbs) Light-Contact category at the W.A.K.O. World Championships 2007 in Belgrade was the fourth lightest of the male Light-Contact tournaments being roughly comparable to the middleweight division when compared to Low-Kick and K-1's weight classes. There were fifteen men taking part in the competition, all based in Europe. Each of the matches was three rounds of two minutes each and were fought under Light-Contact rules.

As there were too few fighters for a tournament designed for sixteen, one of the men had a bye through to the quarter-finals. The tournament gold medalist was Russian Sergey Zhukov who beat Poland's Jerzy Wronski by split decision in the final. The two bronze medalists were Ireland's Kieran Ryan and Slovak Martin Muravský.

== Results ==
1st round
(Hungary) Attila Olasz | D(2:1)
(Turkey) Ibrahim Alwattar
(Russia) Sergey Zhukov | D(3:0)
(Sweden) Emil Hossen
(Republic of Ireland) Kieran Ryan | D(2:1)
(United Kingdom) Christian Thomson
(Austria) Levente Bertalan | D(2:1)
(Italy) Alessio Marchesini
(Croatia) Željan Ješić
(Denmark) Janich Hansen | DQ
(Slovakia) Martin Muravský | D(3:0)
(Serbia) Slavko Maljkovic
(Germany) Kai Becker | D(2:1)
(North Macedonia) Borce Ivanovski

Quarter-finals
(Hungary) Attila Olasz
(Russia) Sergey Zhukov | D(3:0)
(Republic of Ireland) Kieran Ryan | D(2:1)
(Austria) Levente Bertalan
(Denmark) Janich Hansen
(Slovakia) Martin Muravský | D(3:0)
(Germany) Kai Becker
(Poland) Jerzy Wronski | D(3:0)

Semi-finals
(Russia) Sergey Zhukov | D(3:0)
(Republic of Ireland) Kieran Ryan
(Slovakia) Martin Muravský
(Poland) Jerzy Wronski | D(3:0)

Final
(Russia) Sergey Zhukov | D(2:1)
(Poland) Jerzy Wronski

=== Key ===
| Abbreviation | Meaning |
|---|---|
| D (3:0) | Decision (Unanimous) |
| D (2:1) | Decision (Split) |
| DQ | Disqualification |

== See also ==
- List of WAKO Amateur World Championships
- List of WAKO Amateur European Championships
- List of male kickboxers
