= Men's Low-Kick at WAKO World Championships 2007 Belgrade -51 kg =

The men's light bantamweight (51 kg/112.2 lbs) Low-Kick category at the W.A.K.O. World Championships 2007 in Belgrade was the lightest of the male Low-Kick tournaments, involving twelve fighters from three continents (Europe, Asia and Africa). Each of the matches was three rounds of two minutes each and were fought under Low-Kick rules.

Due to there being too few competitors for a tournament that was meant for sixteen, four fighters had a bye through to the quarter-finals. The tournament gold medalist was Azerbaijan's Zaur Mammadov who beat Italian Ivan Sciolla in the final by way of split decision. As a result of reaching the semi-finals, defeated fighters Kyrgyzstan's Utkin Hudoyanov and Bulgarian Aleksandar Aleksandrov were rewarded with bronze medals.

== Results ==
1st round
(Kazakhstan) Yerkebulan Omarov	KO
(India) B. Sushil Kumar
(Italy) Ivan Sciolla	D(3:0)
(Russia) Angel Evertov
(Iran) Jalil Navaz Novin Mehdi	TKO
(Serbia) Srdjan Nadrlyanski
(Mauritius) Niven Ramasubu	D(3:0)
(Morocco) Abdelkrin Ait Haj

Quarter-finals
(Kyrgyzstan) Utkin Hudoyanov	D(3:0)
(Kazakhstan) Yerkebulan Omarov
(Italy) Ivan Sciolla	D(3:0)
(Belarus) Maksim Tulai
(Azerbaijan) Zaur Mammadov	D(3:0)
(Iran) Jalil Navaz Novin Mehdi
(Mauritius) Niven Ramasubu
(Bulgaria) Aleksandar Aleksandrov	D(2:1)

Semi-finals
(Kyrgyzstan) Utkin Hudoyanov
(Italy) Ivan Sciolla	D(3:0)
(Azerbaijan) Zaur Mammadov	D(2:1)
(Bulgaria) Aleksandar Aleksandrov

Final
(Italy) Ivan Sciolla
(Azerbaijan) Zaur Mammadov	D(2:1)

=== Key ===
Abbreviation	Meaning
D (3:0)	Decision (Unanimous)
D (2:1)	Decision (Split)
KO	Knockout
TKO	Technical Knockout

== See also ==
- List of WAKO Amateur World Championships
- List of WAKO Amateur European Championships
- List of male kickboxers
