= Men's K-1 at WAKO World Championships 2007 Belgrade -91 kg =

Kickboxing tournament

The men's heavyweight (91 kg/200.2 lbs) K-1 category at the W.A.K.O. World Championships 2007 in Belgrade was the second heaviest of the K-1 tournaments, involving twelve fighters from two continents (Europe and Africa). Each of the matches was three rounds of two minutes each and were fought under K-1 rules.

As there were not enough fighters for a sixteen-man tournament, four of the contestants had a bye through to the quarter-finals. Belarusian Andrei Malchanau ensured that his country kept up their excellent showing in the K-1 category by defeating Macedonia's Atanas Stojkovski to claim the gold. Serb Nenad Miletic and Croat Zoran Majkic won bronze medals for reaching the semi-finals.

== Results ==
1st round
(South Africa) Francois Carney	WIN
(Bosnia and Herzegovina) Muamer Tutekeic
(Latvia) Igors Goncarovs
(Poland) Kamil Sokolowski	WIN
(Hungary) Attila Boros
(Russia) Salimgerey Rasulov	WIN
(Italy) Matteo Piran
(Morocco) Youssef Addlalaz	WIN

Quarter-finals
(Belarus) Andrei Malchanau	WIN
(South Africa) Francois Carney
(Serbia) Nenad Miletic	WIN
(Poland) Kamil Sokolowski
(Croatia) Zoran Majkic	WIN
(Russia) Salimgerey Rasulov
(Morocco) Youssef Addlalaz
(North Macedonia) Atanas Stojkovski	WIN

Semi-finals
(Belarus) Andrei Malchanau	WIN
(Serbia) Nenad Miletic
(Croatia) Zoran Majkic
(North Macedonia) Atanas Stojkovski	WIN

Final
(Belarus) Andrei Malchanau	WIN
(North Macedonia) Atanas Stojkovski

== See also ==
- List of WAKO Amateur World Championships
- List of WAKO Amateur European Championships
- List of male kickboxers
