= Men's Light-Contact at WAKO World Championships 2007 Belgrade -63 kg =

The men's 63 kg (138.6 lbs) Light-Contact category at the W.A.K.O. World Championships 2007 in Belgrade was the second lightest of the male Light-Contact tournaments being the equivalent of the light welterweight division when compared to Low-Kick and K-1's weight classes. There were twenty-two men from three continents (Europe, Asia and Africa) taking part in the competition. Each of the matches was three rounds of two minutes each and were fought under Light-Contact rules.

Due to the unequal number of fighters designed for a tournament fit for thirty-two, eleven of the contestants had a bye through to the second round. The tournament winner was Croatian Marko Sarko, beating Hungarian Sandor Szanto by unanimous decision in their gold medal match. Ukrainian Kostyantyn Demorets'kyy and Turk Murat Aydin won bronze medals having reached the semi-finals.

== Results ==
1st round
(Italy) Elio Pinto | 3
(Czech Republic) Ondrej Moravec | 0
(Sweden) John Johansson | 3
(Iran) Mostafa Golkoo Khajepour | 0
(Republic of Ireland) Russell Pulin | 2
(Iraq) Qaysar Obeed | 1
(Germany) Markus Ritz | 0
(Slovakia) Vojtech Hudy | 3
(Austria) Mario Krakolinig | 0
(Russia) Stanislav Petrov | 3

2nd round
(Ukraine) Kostyantyn Demorets'kyy | DQ
(Serbia) Igor Sevalevic
(Denmark) Thomas Jensen | 0
(Italy) Elio Pinto | 3
(Croatia) Marko Sarko | 3
(Slovenia) Anze Dimec | 0
(Switzerland) Roger Francioni | 1
(Sweden) John Johansson | 2
(Morocco) Soufiane Taaowati | 3
(Republic of Ireland) Russell Pulin | 0
(Turkey) Murat Aydin | 3
(Slovakia) Vojtech Hudy | 0
(Poland) Maciej Dominczak | 0
(Russia) Stanislav Petrov | 3
(Kazakhstan) Sayan Karibayev
(Hungary) Sandor Szanto | 3

Quarter-finals
(Ukraine) Kostyantyn Demorets'kyy | D(3:0)
(Italy) Elio Pinto
(Croatia) Marko Sarko | DQ
(Sweden) John Johansson
(Morocco) Soufiane Taaowati
(Turkey) Murat Aydin | D(2:1)
(Russia) Stanislav Petrov
(Hungary) Sandor Szanto | D(3:0)

Semi-finals
(Ukraine) Kostyantyn Demorets'kyy
(Croatia) Marko Sarko | D(2:1)
(Turkey) Murat Aydin
(Hungary) Sandor Szanto | D(3:0)

Final
(Croatia) Marko Sarko | D(3:0)
(Hungary) Sandor Szanto

=== Key ===
| Abbreviation | Meaning |
|---|---|
| D (3:0) | Decision (Unanimous) |
| D (2:1) | Decision (Split) |
| DQ | Disqualification |

== See also ==
- List of WAKO Amateur World Championships
- List of WAKO Amateur European Championships
- List of male kickboxers
