= Women's Low-Kick at WAKO World Championships 2007 Belgrade +70 kg =

Kickboxing tournament

The women's Super Heavyweight (over 70 kg/154 lbs) Low-Kick category at the W.A.K.O. World Championships 2007 in Belgrade was the heaviest of the female Low-Kick tournaments, involving just five fighters from three continents (Europe, Asia and Africa). Each of the matches was three rounds of two minutes each and were fought under Low-Kick rules.

Due to the low levels of contestants, unsuitable for an eight-person tournament, three women had byes through to the semi-finals. Poland's Paulina Biec won the gold medal defeating Serbian Olivera Milanovic in the final by unanimous decision. Defeated semi finalists Aigul Kozhagaliyeva from Kazakhstan and Benita Muller from South Africa won bronze medals.

== Results ==
Quarter-finals
(South Africa) Benita Muller	D(3:0)
(Montenegro) Jelica Golubovic

Semi-finals
(Kazakhstan) Aigul Kozhagaliyeva
(Serbia) Olivera Milanovic	D(3:0)
(Poland) Paulina Biec	D(3:0)
(South Africa) Benita Muller

Final
(Serbia) Olivera Milanovic
(Poland) Paulina Biec	D(3:0)

=== Key ===
Abbreviation	Meaning
D (3:0)	Decision (Unanimous)

== See also ==
- List of WAKO Amateur World Championships
- List of WAKO Amateur European Championships
- List of female kickboxers
