= Men's K-1 at WAKO World Championships 2007 Belgrade -81 kg =

Kickboxing tournament

The men's light heavyweight (81 kg/178.2 lbs) K-1 category at the W.A.K.O. World Championships 2007 in Belgrade was the fourth heaviest of the K-1 tournaments, involving fifteen fighters from two continents (Europe and Africa). Each of the matches was three rounds of two minutes each and were fought under K-1 rules.

As there was one too few contestants for a sixteen-man tournament, one of the fighters had a bye through to the quarter-finals. The tournament gold medallist was Ukraine's Dmitry Kirpan who defeated Croatia's Luka Simic. Dzianis Hanchardnak from the Belarus and Alexander Stetsurenko from Russia received bronze medals for their efforts in reaching the semi-finals.

== Results ==
1st round
(Belarus) Dzianis Hanchardnak	WIN
(Poland) Pawel Tracz
(Serbia) Bojan Cavnic	WIN
(Italy) Evan Valerii
(Portugal) Joao Oliveira
(South Africa) Roger Goncalves	WIN
(Montenegro) Miloje Petrovic
(Ukraine) Dmitry Kirpan	WIN
(Hungary) Arpad Forgon	WIN
(Turkey) Muzaffer Gemici
(Russia) Alexander Stetsurenko	WIN
(France) Steve Zaidi
(Croatia) Luka Simic	WIN
(Israel) Aldad Lave

Quarter-finals
(Belarus) Dzianis Hanchardnak	WIN
(Serbia) Bojan Cavnic
(South Africa) Roger Goncalves
(Ukraine) Dmitry Kirpan	WIN
(Hungary) Arpad Forgon
(Russia) Alexander Stetsurenko	WIN
(Croatia) Luka Simic	WIN
(Morocco) Abdelilah Sarti

Semi-finals
(Belarus) Dzianis Hanchardnak
(Ukraine) Dmitry Kirpan	WIN
(Russia) Alexander Stetsurenko
(Croatia) Luka Simic	WIN

Final
(Ukraine) Dmitry Kirpan
Luka Simic

== See also ==
- List of WAKO Amateur World Championships
- List of WAKO Amateur European Championships
- List of male kickboxers
