= Men's Low-Kick at WAKO World Championships 2007 Belgrade -67 kg =

The men's welterweight (67 kg/147.4 lbs) Low-Kick category at the W.A.K.O. World Championships 2007 in Belgrade was the sixth lightest of the male Low-Kick tournaments, involving seventeen fighters from two continents (Europe and Asia). Each of the matches was three rounds of two minutes each and were fought under Low-Kick rules.

As there were too few competitors for a thirty-two man tournament, fifteen of the fighters had byes to the second round. The tournament winner was Russian Nikolay Shtakhanov who won gold by defeating Turkey's Yahya Alemdag by unanimous decision in their final match. Serb Nebojsa Denic and Azerbaijani Ramil Nadirov won bronze medals for reaching the semi-finals.

== Results ==
1st round
(Spain) Mikel Moreno
(Azerbaijan) Ramil Nadirov	D(3:0)

2nd round
(Greece) Athanasios Karoussos
(Italy) Andrea Colantoni	D(3:0)
(Serbia) Nebojsa Denic	D(3:0)
(Iran) Hosseini Abouzar
(Denmark) Kennie Larsen
(Bosnia and Herzegovina) Eldin Raonic	D(2:1)
(Latvia) Eduards Krauklis
(Turkey) Yahya Alemdag	D(3:0)
(Belarus) Dzmitry Baranau	D(3:0)
(Slovakia) Peter Petru
(Kyrgyzstan) Stalbek Darkambaev
(Azerbaijan) Ramil Nadirov	D(3:0)
(Kazakhstan) Samat Kadyrbekov	D(3:0)
(Poland) Lukasz Szulc
(Hungary) Zsolt Nagy
(Russia) Nikolay Shtakhanov	D(3:0)

Quarter-finals
(Italy) Andrea Colantoni
(Serbia) Nebojsa Denic	KO
(Bosnia and Herzegovina) Eldin Raonic
(Turkey) Yahya Alemdag	WO
(Belarus) Dzmitry Baranau
(Azerbaijan) Ramil Nadirov	D(3:0)
(Kazakhstan) Samat Kadyrbekov
(Russia) Nikolay Shtakhanov	D(3:0)

Semi-finals
(Serbia) Nebojsa Denic
(Turkey) Yahya Alemdag	D(3:0)
(Azerbaijan) Ramil Nadirov
(Russia) Nikolay Shtakhanov	D(3:0)

Final
(Turkey) Yahya Alemdag
(Russia) Nikolay Shtakhanov	D(3:0)

=== Key ===
Abbreviation	Meaning
D (3:0)	Decision (Unanimous)
D (2:1)	Decision (Split)
KO	Knockout
WO	Walkover (No fight)

== See also ==
- List of WAKO Amateur World Championships
- List of WAKO Amateur European Championships
- List of male kickboxers
