= Men's Light-Contact at WAKO World Championships 2007 Belgrade -94 kg =

The men's 94 kg (206.8 lbs) Light-Contact category at the W.A.K.O. World Championships 2007 in Belgrade was the second heaviest of the male Light-Contact tournaments being the equivalent of super heavyweight in the Low-Kick and K-1 weight classes. There were sixteen men taking part in the competition, all based in Europe. Each of the matches was three rounds of two minutes each and were fought under Light-Contact rules.

The tournament winner was Germany's Giovanni Nurchi who defeated Emin Panyan from Russia by split decision in the competitions final match to win the gold medal. Defeated semi finalists Artem Vasylenko from Ukraine and Slovenian Ranis Smajlovic were rewarded for their efforts by claiming the bronze medal spots.

== Results ==
1st Round
(Italy) Agostino Pavesi
(Ukraine) Artem Vasylenko	D(3:0)
(Austria) Patrick Patrick
(Serbia) Dejan Gavrilovic	D(2:1)
(Russia) Emin Panyan	D(3:0)
(Switzerland) Franz Gruber
(United Kingdom) Richard Phillips
(Hungary) Tibor Wappel	D(3:0)
(Slovakia) Andrej Micianik
(Slovenia) Ranis Smajlovic	D(2:1)
(Czech Republic) Petr Kotik
(North Macedonia) Mirko Kostik	WO
(Croatia) Vladimir Celar
(Poland) Bartlomiej Bocian	D(3:0)
(Republic of Ireland) Colin O'Shaughnessy
(Germany) Giovanni Nurchi	D(3:0)

Quarter Finals
(Ukraine) Artem Vasylenko	D(2:1)
(Serbia) Dejan Gavrilovic
(Russia) Emin Panyan	D(2:1)
(Hungary) Tibor Wappel
(Slovenia) Ranis Smajlovic	D(3:0)
(North Macedonia) Mirko Kostik
(Poland) Bartlomiej Bocian
(Germany) Giovanni Nurchi	D(3:0)

Semi Finals
(Ukraine) Artem Vasylenko
(Russia) Emin Panyan	D(3:0)
(Slovenia) Ranis Smajlovic
(Germany) Giovanni Nurchi	AB

Final
(Russia) Emin Panyan
(Germany) Giovanni Nurchi	D(2:1)

=== Key ===
Abbreviation	Meaning
D (3:0)	Decision (Unanimous)
D (2:1)	Decision (Split)
AB	Abandonment (Injury in match)
WO	Walkover (No fight)

== See also ==
- List of WAKO Amateur World Championships
- List of WAKO Amateur European Championships
- List of male kickboxers
