= Women's K-1 at WAKO World Championships 2007 Belgrade -56 kg =

Kickboxing tournament

The women's lightweight (56 kg/123.2 lbs) K-1 category at the W.A.K.O. World Championships 2007 in Belgrade was the second lightest of the female K-1 tournaments. There were six women from two continents (Europe and Africa) taking part in the competition. Each of the matches was three rounds of two minutes each and were fought under K-1 rules.

Due to the low level of competitors for an eight-woman tournament, two fighters had byes through to the semi-finals. The tournament winner was Morocco's Souad Rochdi who defeated Alena Kuchynskaya from Belarus in the final to win the gold medal. Poland's Natalia Grabowska and Italian Donatella Panu won bronze medals.

== Results ==
Quarter-finals
(South Africa) Kerry Gray
(Belarus) Alena Kuchynskaya	WIN
(Italy) Donatella Panu	WIN
(Hungary) Petra Buchberger

Semi-finals
(Poland) Natalia Grabowska
(Belarus) Alena Kuchynskaya	WIN
(Morocco) Souad Rochdi	WIN
(Italy) Donatella Panu

Final
(Belarus) Alena Kuchynskaya
(Morocco) Souad Rochdi	WIN

== See also ==
- List of WAKO Amateur World Championships
- List of WAKO Amateur European Championships
- List of female kickboxers
