= Men's K-1 at WAKO World Championships 2007 Belgrade -54 kg =

Kickboxing tournament

The men's bantamweight (54 kg/118.8 lbs) K-1 category at the W.A.K.O. World Championships 2007 in Belgrade was the lightest of the K-1 tournaments and the smallest, involving just four fighters from two continents (Europe and Africa). Each of the matches was three rounds of two minutes each and were fought under K-1 rules.

The tournament gold medallist was Portugal's Fernando Machado who defeated Aliaksei Papou from Belarus in the final. The two other fighters at the event, Azamat Murzabekov from Russia and Amine Alaoui M'Hamdi from Morocco, were awarded bronze medals.

== Results ==
Semi Finals		Final
(Belarus) Aliaksei Papou	WIN
(Russia) Azamat Murzabekov		(Belarus) Aliaksei Papou
(Morocco) Amine Alaoui M'Hamdi		(Portugal) Fernando Machado	WIN
(Portugal) Fernando Machado	WIN

== See also ==
- List of WAKO Amateur World Championships
- List of WAKO Amateur European Championships
- List of male kickboxers
