= Women's Low-Kick at WAKO World Championships 2007 Belgrade -70 kg =

Category at the 2007 W.A.K.O. World Championships

The women's heavyweight (70 kg/154 lbs) Low-Kick category at the W.A.K.O. World Championships 2007 in Belgrade was the second heaviest of the female Low-Kick tournaments, involving eight fighters from two continents (Europe and Africa). Each of the matches was three rounds of two minutes each and were fought under Low-Kick rules.

The tournament winner was Morocco's Amzail Bouchra who won gold by beating Russia's Elena Kondratyeva in the final by split decision. Defeated semi finalists Natasa Ivetic from Serbia and Croatian Nives Radic had to make do with bronze medals.

== Results ==
Quarter Finals
(Serbia) Natasa Ivetic	D(3:0)
(Hungary) Mariann Hudak
(Morocco) Amzail Bouchra	D(3:0)
(Ukraine) Teyana Ivashchenko
(Romania) Adriana Tatu
(Croatia) Nives Radic	KO
(Sweden) Linn Adermark
(Russia) Elena Kondratyeva	D(3:0)

Semi Finals
(Serbia) Natasa Ivetic
(Morocco) Amzail Bouchra	D(2:1)
(Croatia) Nives Radic	D(3:0)
(Russia) Elena Kondratyeva

Final
(Morocco) Amzail Bouchra	D(3:0)
(Russia) Elena Kondratyeva

=== Key ===
Abbreviation	Meaning
D (3:0)	Decision (Unanimous)
D (2:1)	Decision (Split)
KO	Knockout

== See also ==
- List of WAKO Amateur World Championships
- List of WAKO Amateur European Championships
- List of female kickboxers
