= Women's Low-Kick at WAKO World Championships 2007 Belgrade -56 kg =

Kickboxing tournament

The women's lightweight (56 kg/123.2 lbs) Low-Kick category at the W.A.K.O. World Championships 2007 in Belgrade was the second-lightest of the female Low-Kick tournaments, involving nine fighters all based in Europe. Each of the matches was three rounds of two minutes each and were fought under Low-Kick rules.

As there were too few fighters for a sixteen-person tournament, seven women had a bye through to the quarter-finals. Serbia's Milena Dincic beat Russia's Lidia Andreeva by unanimous decision in the gold medal match. Pole Alicja Piecyk and Swede Elisa Albinsson took the bronze medal positions.

== Results ==
1st round
(Sweden) Elisa Albinsson	D(3:0)
(Croatia) Jelena Rados

Quarter-finals
(Serbia) Milena Dincic	D(2:1)
(Turkey) Kiraz Sahin
(Poland) Alicja Piecyk	D(2:1)
(Ukraine) Ellada Pohosyan
(Italy) Emanuela Margutti
(Sweden) Elisa Albinsson	D(3:0)
(Austria) Myra Winkleman
(Russia) Lidia Andreeva	D(3:0)

Semi-finals
(Serbia) Milena Dincic	D(3:0)
(Poland) Alicja Piecyk
(Sweden) Elisa Albinsson
(Russia) Lidia Andreeva	D(3:0)

Final
(Serbia) Milena Dincic	D(3:0)
(Russia) Lidia Andreeva

=== Key ===
Abbreviation	Meaning
D (3:0)	Decision (Unanimous)
D (2:1)	Decision (Split)

== See also ==
- List of WAKO Amateur World Championships
- List of WAKO Amateur European Championships
- List of female kickboxers
