= Men's Low-Kick at WAKO World Championships 2007 Belgrade -54 kg =

The men's bantamweight (54 kg/118.8 lbs) Low-Kick category at the W.A.K.O. World Championships 2007 in Belgrade was the second lightest of the male Low-Kick tournaments and the most sparse, involving just six fighters from three continents (Europe, Asia and Africa). Each of the matches was three rounds of two minutes each and were fought under Low-Kick rules.

Due to the small number of competitors for a tournament designed for eight men, two of the contestants had byes through to the semi-finals. The eventual tournament champion was Azerbaijani Emil Karimov who defeated the Bulgarian Jordan Vassilev by technical knockout in the final to claim gold. Defeated semi finalists Fabrice Bauluck from Mauritius and Moroccan Younes Ouali Alami won bronze medals.

== Results ==
Quarter-finals		Semi-finals		Final
		(Azerbaijan) Emil Karimov	D(3:0)
(Mauritius) Fabrice Bauluck	D(3:0)	(Mauritius) Fabrice Bauluck
(Spain) Julio Vargas				(Azerbaijan) Emil Karimov	TKO
(Morocco) Younes Ouali Alami	D(2:1)			(Bulgaria) Jordan Vassilev
(Russia) Ivan Bityutskikh		(Morocco) Younes Ouali Alami
		(Bulgaria) Jordan Vassilev	D(2:1)

=== Key ===
Abbreviation	Meaning
D (3:0)	Decision (Unanimous)
D (2:1)	Decision (Split)
TKO	Technical Knockout

== See also ==
- List of WAKO Amateur World Championships
- List of WAKO Amateur European Championships
- List of male kickboxers
