= Women's Low-Kick at WAKO World Championships 2007 Belgrade -52 kg =

Kickboxing tournament

The women's featherweight (52 kg/114.4 lbs) Low-Kick category at the W.A.K.O. World Championships 2007 in Belgrade was the lightest of the female Low-Kick tournaments, involving nine fighters from two continents (Europe and Asia). Each of the matches was three rounds of two minutes each and were fought under Low-Kick rules.

Due to the low number of competitors unsuitable for a tournament designed for sixteen, seven women had byes through to the quarter-finals. The tournament was won by Turkey's Seda Duygu Aygün who defeated Ukrainian Nadiya Khayenok in the final by unanimous decision. Aliya Boranbayeva from Kazakhstan and Maria Krivoshapkina from Russia won bronze medals for their semi final appearances.

== Results ==
1st round
(Croatia) Marina Horvat
(Turkey) Seda Duygu Aygün	D(2:1)

Quarter-finals
(Italy) Rita De Angelis
(Kazakhstan) Aliya Boranbayeva	D(2:1)
(Ukraine) Nadiya Khayenok	D(2:1)
(Bulgaria) Anna Minkova
(Serbia) Djendji Fleis
(Turkey) Seda Duygu Aygün	D(3:0)
(Austria) Doris Köhler
(Russia) Maria Krivoshapkina	D(2:1)

Semi-finals
(Kazakhstan) Aliya Boranbayeva
(Ukraine) Nadiya Khayenok	D(2:1)
(Turkey) Seda Duygu Aygün	D(2:1)
(Russia) Maria Krivoshapkina

Final
(Ukraine) Nadiya Khayenok
(Turkey) Seda Duygu Aygün	D(3:0)

=== Key ===
Abbreviation	Meaning
D (3:0)	Decision (Unanimous)
D (2:1)	Decision (Split)

== See also ==
- List of WAKO Amateur World Championships
- List of WAKO Amateur European Championships
- List of female kickboxers
