= Women's Low-Kick at WAKO World Championships 2007 Belgrade -65 kg =

Kickboxing tournament

The women's light heavyweight (65 kg/143 lbs) Low-Kick category at the W.A.K.O. World Championships 2007 in Belgrade was the third heaviest of the female Low-Kick tournaments, involving just six fighters - all based in Europe. Each of the matches was three rounds of two minutes each and were fought under Low-Kick rules.

As there were too few fighters for an eight-woman tournament, two of the competitors were given a bye through to the semi-finals. Kamila Balanda from Poland defeated Mimma Mandolini from Italy in the final by split decision to win the gold medal. Defeated semi finalists Vera Avdeeva from Russia and Ina Ozerava from Belarus both won bronze medals.

== Results ==
| Quarter-finals | | Semi-finals | | Final |
| | | (Russia) Vera Avdeeva |
| (Poland) Kamila Balanda | D(3:0) | (Poland) Kamila Balanda | D(2:1) |
| (Serbia) Maja Djukanovic | | | | (Poland) Kamila Balanda | D(2:1) |
| (Belarus) Ina Ozerava | D(2:1) | | | (Italy) Mimma Mandolini |
| (Croatia) Nevena Juranovic | | (Belarus) Ina Ozerava |
| | | (Italy) Mimma Mandolini | D(3:0) |

=== Key ===
| Abbreviation | Meaning |
|---|---|
| D (3:0) | Decision (Unanimous) |
| D (2:1) | Decision (Split) |

== See also ==
- List of WAKO Amateur World Championships
- List of WAKO Amateur European Championships
- List of female kickboxers
