= Women's K-1 at WAKO World Championships 2007 Belgrade -65 kg =

Kickboxing tournament

The women's light heavyweight (65 kg/143 lbs) K-1 category at the W.A.K.O. World Championships 2007 in Belgrade was the third heaviest of the female K-1 tournaments. There were just three women present at the competition, all based in Europe. Each of the matches was three rounds of two minutes each and were fought under K-1 rules.

Due to the low level of competitors, one of the women received a bye straight through to the final. In the end it was Belarus's Ala Ivashkevich who won gold, defeating Russian Elena Solareva in the final. The tournaments only other fighter, Jelena Djuric from Serbia, received the bronze medal.

== Results ==
| Semi Finals | | Final |
| (Serbia) Jelena Djuric |
| (Belarus) Ala Ivashkevich | WIN | (Belarus) Ala Ivashkevich |
| | | (Russia) Elena Solareva | WIN |

== See also ==
- List of WAKO Amateur World Championships
- List of WAKO Amateur European Championships
- List of female kickboxers
