= Women's K-1 at WAKO World Championships 2007 Belgrade -60 kg =

Kickboxing tournament

The women's middleweight (60 kg/132 lbs) K-1 category at the W.A.K.O. World Championships 2007 in Belgrade was the third lightest of the female K-1 tournaments. There were five women from two continents (Europe and Africa) taking part in the competition. Each of the matches was three rounds of two minutes each and were fought under K-1 rules.

As there were not enough fighters for an eight-person tournament, three of the women had byes through to the semi-finals. The tournament was won by Alena Muratava from Belarus who defeated Kseniya Belskaya from Russia in the final to win gold. Serbia's Suzana Radovanovic and Italy's Paola Cappucci won bronze medals for reaching the semi-finals.

== Results ==
Quarter-finals
(Italy) Paola Cappucci	WIN
(Morocco) Ilhame Rhaffari

Semi-finals
(Serbia) Suzana Radovanovic
(Belarus) Alena Muratava	WIN
(Russia) Kseniya Belskaya	WIN
(Italy) Paola Cappucci

Final
(Belarus) Alena Muratava	WIN
(Russia) Kseniya Belskaya

== See also ==
- List of WAKO Amateur World Championships
- List of WAKO Amateur European Championships
- List of female kickboxers
