= Men's Light-Contact at WAKO World Championships 2007 Belgrade -69 kg =

The men's 69 kg (151.8 lbs) Light-Contact category at the W.A.K.O. World Championships 2007 in Belgrade was the third lightest of the male Light-Contact tournaments falling in between the welterweight and light middleweight divisions when compared to Low-Kick and K-1's weight classes. There were twenty-two men from three continents (Europe, Africa and South America) taking part in the competition. Each of the matches was three rounds of two minutes each and were fought under Light-Contact rules.

Due to an unequal number of competitors for a tournament designed for thirty two contestants, nine of the men had a bye through to the second round. The tournament gold medallist was Poland's Przemyslaw Ziemnicki who won the tournament without having to fight in the final as both his potential opponents, Russia's Evgeny Mayer and Hungary's László Szabó were disqualified in their semi final match. This meant that there was no silver medal winner in the category and only one bronze, which went to Ziemnicki's semi final opponent - Croatian Dejan Cepic.

== Results ==
1st Round
(Brazil) Laecio Nunes
(Germany) Dimitri Hait	DQ
(Switzerland) Ivo Furrer
(Hungary) László Szabó	D(3:0)
(Latvia) Martins Porozovs
(Serbia) Sinia Vladimirovic	D(2:1)
(Croatia) Dejan Cepic	D(3:0)
(United Kingdom) Audifax Kinga
(North Macedonia) Todor Anastasiev
(Sweden) Ted Anesvard	D(3:0)
(Greece) Georgios Kardaris	D(2:1)
(Republic of Ireland) David Clarke
(Austria) Bernhard Hudelist	D(3:0)
(Slovenia) Jure Klemewete

2nd Round
(France) Gregory Larbi
(Russia) Evgeny Mayer	D(3:0)
(Turkey) Ozgur Kaygusuz
(Germany) Dimitri Hait	D(2:1)
(Italy) Andrea Punzio
(Hungary) László Szabó	D(3:0)
(Czech Republic) Marek Svitek	D(3:0)
(Serbia) Sinia Vladimirovic
(Egypt) Mohamed Hamdan
(Croatia) Dejan Cepic	TKO
(Slovakia) Peter Guzy	D(3:0)
(Sweden) Ted Anesvard
(Ukraine) Ihor Pavlenko
(Greece) Georgios Kardaris	WO
(Austria) Bernhard Hudelist
(Poland) Przemyslaw Ziemnicki	D(3:0)

Quarter Finals
(Russia) Evgeny Mayer	D(3:0)
(Germany) Dimitri Hait
(Hungary) László Szabó	D(3:0)
(Czech Republic) Marek Svitek
(Croatia) Dejan Cepic	D(3:0)
(Slovakia) Peter Guzy
(Greece) Georgios Kardaris
(Poland) Przemyslaw Ziemnicki	D(3:0)

Semi Finals
(Russia) Evgeny Mayer *
(Hungary) László Szabó *
(Croatia) Dejan Cepic
(Poland) Przemyslaw Ziemnicki	D(3:0)

Final
(Poland) Przemyslaw Ziemnicki	WO

* Evgeny Mayer and László Szabó both disqualified - there will be no silver or bronze medal for either fighter

=== Key ===
Abbreviation	Meaning
D (3:0)	Decision (Unanimous)
D (2:1)	Decision (Split)
KO	Knockout
TKO	Technical Knockout
AB	Abandonment (Injury in match)
WO	Walkover (No fight)
DQ	Disqualification

== See also ==
- List of WAKO Amateur World Championships
- List of WAKO Amateur European Championships
- List of male kickboxers
