= Men's Light-Contact at WAKO World Championships 2007 Belgrade -57 kg =

The men's 57 kg (125.4 lbs) Light-Contact category at the W.A.K.O. World Championships 2007 in Belgrade was the lightest of the male Light-Contact tournaments being the equivalent of the featherweight division when compared to Low-Kick and K-1's weight classes. There were fourteen men from two continents (Europe and Asia) taking part in the competition. Each of the matches was three rounds of two minutes each and were fought under Light-Contact rules.

Due to the uneven number of fighters required for a tournament designed for sixteen, one of the contestants had a bye through to the quarter-final stage. The tournament winner was Hungary's Dezső Debreczeni who defeated Russia's Maxim Aysin in the final to claim the gold. Turkey's Selcuk Laleci and Sweden's Thomas Karlsson claimed bronze medals for reaching the semi-finals.

== Results ==
1st round
(United Kingdom) Barry McGinlay	D(3:0)
(Austria) Clemens Graf
(Turkey) Selcuk Laleci	WO
(North Macedonia) Ninoslav Sabotkovski
(Iraq) Bassm Alsrai
(France) Joel Cazeneuve	D(3:0)
(Poland) Kacper Narloch
(Slovakia) Viktor Zuffa	D(2:1)
(Sweden) Thomas Karlsson	D(3:0)
(Italy) Marco Sarais
(Slovenia) Dusan Lamut	D(3:0)
(India) Sachin K. Mahanta

Quarter-finals
(Hungary) Dezső Debreczeni	D(3:0)
(United Kingdom) Barry McGinlay
(Turkey) Selcuk Laleci	D(2:1)
(France) Joel Cazeneuve
(Slovakia) Viktor Zuffa
(Sweden) Thomas Karlsson	D(2:1)
(Slovenia) Dusan Lamut
(Russia) Maxim Aysin	D(3:0)

Semi-finals
(Hungary) Dezső Debreczeni	D(3:0)
(Turkey) Selcuk Laleci
(Sweden) Thomas Karlsson
(Russia) Maxim Aysin	D(3:0)

Final
(Hungary) Dezső Debreczeni	D(2:1)
(Russia) Maxim Aysin

=== Key ===
Abbreviation	Meaning
D (3:0)	Decision (Unanimous)
D (2:1)	Decision (Split)
WO	Walkover (No fight)

== See also ==
- List of WAKO Amateur World Championships
- List of WAKO Amateur European Championships
- List of male kickboxers
