= Men's K-1 at WAKO World Championships 2007 Belgrade -57 kg =

Kickboxing tournament

The men's featherweight (57 kg/125.4 lbs) K-1 category at the W.A.K.O. World Championships 2007 in Belgrade was the second lightest of the K-1 tournaments, involving nine fighters from three continents (Europe, Africa and South America). Each of the matches was three rounds of two minutes each and were fought under K-1 rules.

Due to the small number of contestants inappropriate for a sixteen-man tournament, seven of the fighters had byes through to the quarter-finals. The tournament winner was Ukraine's Maksym Glubochenko, who won the gold medal by defeating Serbia's Aleksandar Gogic. Defeated semi-finalists Gaetano Verziere (from Italy) and Yury Satsuk (from Belarus) won bronze medals.

== Results ==
1st round
(Belarus) Yury Satsuk	WIN
(France) Montier Gaylord

Quarter-finals
(Portugal) Ruben Almeida
(Italy) Gaetano Verziere	WIN
(Ukraine) Maksym Glubochenko	WIN
(Ecuador) Javier Sanchez
(Croatia) Fatmir Ademi
(Belarus) Yury Satsuk	WIN
(Morocco) Aithma Abdelhakim
(Serbia) Aleksandar Gogic	WIN

Semi-finals
(Italy) Gaetano Verziere
(Ukraine) Maksym Glubochenko	WIN
(Belarus) Yury Satsuk
(Serbia) Aleksandar Gogic	WIN

Final
(Ukraine) Maksym Glubochenko	WIN
(Serbia) Aleksandar Gogic

== See also ==
- List of WAKO Amateur World Championships
- List of WAKO Amateur European Championships
- List of male kickboxers
