= Men's Light-Contact at WAKO World Championships 2007 Belgrade +94 kg =

The men's Over 94 kg (+206.8 lbs) Light-Contact category at the W.A.K.O. World Championships 2007 in Belgrade was the heaviest of the male Light-Contact tournaments with the closest equivalent being super heavyweight in the Low-Kick and K-1 weight classes. There were fifteen men from two continents (Europe and Africa) taking part in the competition. Each of the matches was three rounds of two minutes each and were fought under Light-Contact rules.

Because there was one too few fighters for a sixteen-man tournament, one of the contestants was given a bye into the quarter finals. The tournament gold medalist was the Polish fighter Michal Wszelak who defeated his opponent from Ukraine, Igor Kravchuk, in the final by abandonment as Igor suffered an injury during the final match. Semi finalists Csaba Podor from Hungary and Pascal Blunschi from Switzerland both received bronze medals.

== Results ==
1st Round
(Italy) Cristian Lubrano
(Croatia) Tomislav Cikotic | D(3:0)
(Turkey) Esat Kaya
(Hungary) Csaba Podor | TKO
(South Africa) Jan Botes
(Russia) Pavel Zaev | D(3:0)
(Austria) Rupert Gritsch
(Ukraine) Igor Kravchuk | D(3:0)
(Switzerland) Pascal Blunschi | D(3:0)
(North Macedonia) Aleksandar Stojkovski
(Germany) Roman Reusch
(Slovenia) Franci Skuber | D(3:0)
(United Kingdom) Kevin Guy
(Republic of Ireland) Anthony Fallon | D(2:1)

Quarter Finals
(Croatia) Tomislav Cikotic
(Hungary) Csaba Podor | TKO
(Russia) Pavel Zaev
(Ukraine) Igor Kravchuk | D(2:1)
(Switzerland) Pascal Blunschi | D(2:1)
(Slovenia) Franci Skuber
(Republic of Ireland) Anthony Fallon
(Poland) Michal Wszelak | D(3:0)

Semi Finals
(Hungary) Csaba Podor
(Ukraine) Igor Kravchuk | D(2:1)
(Switzerland) Pascal Blunschi
(Poland) Michal Wszelak | DQ

Final
(Ukraine) Igor Kravchuk
(Poland) Michal Wszelak | AB

=== Key ===
| Abbreviation | Meaning |
|---|---|
| D (3:0) | Decision (Unanimous) |
| D (2:1) | Decision (Split) |
| TKO | Technical Knockout |
| AB | Abandonment (Injury in match) |
| DQ | Disqualification |

== See also ==
- List of WAKO Amateur World Championships
- List of WAKO Amateur European Championships
- List of male kickboxers
