= Men's Low-Kick at WAKO World Championships 2007 Belgrade -57 kg =

Kickboxing tournament

The men's featherweight (57 kg/125.4 lbs) Low-Kick category at the W.A.K.O. World Championships 2007 in Belgrade was the third lightest of the male Low-Kick tournaments involving twelve fighters from three continents (Europe, Asia and Africa). Each of the matches was three rounds of two minutes each and were fought under Low-Kick rules.

As there were too few competitors for a sixteen-man tournament, four of the fighters had byes through to the quarter-finals. The tournament winner was Dzmitry Varatis from Belarus who defeated Serbian Boban Marinkovic in the final to win gold. Semi-finalists Elnur Salamov from Azerbaijan and Russian Umar Paskhaev received bronze medals.

== Results ==
1st round
(Croatia) Goran Mimica	D(3:0)
(India) Yumnam Arun Kumar
(Iran) Mojtaba Gelyan Farahmand
(Serbia) Boban Marinkovic	D(3:0)
(Slovakia) Miroslav Madzin
(Russia) Umar Paskhaev	D(3:0)
(Portugal) Rui Duarte
(Belarus) Dzmitry Varatis	D(2:1)

Quarter-finals
(Azerbaijan) Elnur Salamov	KO
(Croatia) Goran Mimica
(Kazakhstan) Asset Tolenov
(Serbia) Boban Marinkovic	D(3:0)
(Morocco) Issam Laafissi
(Russia) Umar Paskhaev	D(3:0)
(Kyrgyzstan) Mirbek Suiumbaev
(Belarus) Dzmitry Varatis	D(3:0)

Semi-finals
(Azerbaijan) Elnur Salamov
(Serbia) Boban Marinkovic	D(3:0)
(Russia) Umar Paskhaev
(Belarus) Dzmitry Varatis	D(3:0)

Final
(Serbia) Boban Marinkovic
(Belarus) Dzmitry Varatis	D(2:1)

=== Key ===
Abbreviation	Meaning
D (3:0)	Decision (Unanimous)
D (2:1)	Decision (Split)
KO	Knockout

== See also ==
- List of WAKO Amateur World Championships
- List of WAKO Amateur European Championships
- List of male kickboxers
