= Men's Low-Kick at WAKO World Championships 2007 Belgrade -86 kg =

The men's cruiserweight (86 kg/189.2 lbs) Low-Kick category at the W.A.K.O. World Championships 2007 in Belgrade was the third heaviest of the male Low-Kick tournaments, involving eighteen fighters from three continents (Europe, Asia and Africa). Each of the matches was three rounds of two minutes each and were fought under Low-Kick rules.

Due to there not being enough competitors for a thirty-two man tournament, fourteen men received a bye through to the second round. The gold medal was won by Russia's Gamzat Isalmagomedov who defeated Croatia's Stipe Stipetic in the final by knockout. The bronze medal positions were taken by Bosnian Bojan Glavas and Kazak Georgiy Yemeliyanov.

== Results ==
1st Round
(Poland) Radoslaw Rydzewski
(Bosnia and Herzegovina) Bojan Glavas | D(2:1)
(Kazakhstan) Georgiy Yemeliyanov | D(3:0)
(Morocco) Adil Atmari

2nd Round
(Russia) Gamzat Isalmagomedov | D(3:0)
(Estonia) Hannes Perk
(Italy) Claudio Grazioni
(Belarus) Vladimir Popov | WO
(North Macedonia) Darko Catleski | WO
(Egypt) Ahmed Younes
(Latvia) Mairis Briedis
(Bosnia and Herzegovina) Bojan Glavas | D(3:0)
(Portugal) Bruno Susano | D(3:0)
(France) David Greter
(Montenegro) Milos Golic
(Kazakhstan) Georgiy Yemeliyanov | D(3:0)
(Serbia) Ivan Sočo
(Slovakia) Peter Fiala | WO
(Azerbaijan) Samir Kazimov
(Croatia) Stipe Stipetic | D(3:0)

Quarter Finals
(Russia) Gamzat Isalmagomedov | D(3:0)
(Belarus) Vladimir Popov
(North Macedonia) Darko Catleski
(Bosnia and Herzegovina) Bojan Glavas | D(3:0)
(Portugal) Bruno Susano
(Kazakhstan) Georgiy Yemeliyanov | D(2:1)
(Slovakia) Peter Fiala
(Croatia) Stipe Stipetic | D(3:0)

Semi Finals
(Russia) Gamzat Isalmagomedov | D(3:0)
(Bosnia and Herzegovina) Bojan Glavas
(Kazakhstan) Georgiy Yemeliyanov
(Croatia) Stipe Stipetic | D(2:1)

Final
(Russia) Gamzat Isalmagomedov | KO
(Croatia) Stipe Stipetic

=== Key ===
| Abbreviation | Meaning |
|---|---|
| D (3:0) | Decision (Unanimous) |
| D (2:1) | Decision (Split) |
| KO | Knockout |
| WO | Walkover (No fight) |

== See also ==
- List of WAKO Amateur World Championships
- List of WAKO Amateur European Championships
- List of male kickboxers
