= Women's Low-Kick at WAKO World Championships 2007 Belgrade -60 kg =

Kickboxing tournament

The women's middleweight (60 kg/132 lbs) Low-Kick category at the W.A.K.O. World Championships 2007 in Belgrade was the third lightest of the female Low-Kick tournaments, involving eleven fighters from four continents (Europe, Asia, Africa and South America). Each of the matches was three rounds of two minutes each and were fought under Low-Kick rules.

Due to the lower than expected competitors for a sixteen-person tournament, five of the fighters had byes through to the quarter-finals. The tournament was won by Valerija Kurluk from Kazakhstan who defeated the Russian Fatima Bokova by split decision in their gold medal match. Italian Barbara Plazzoli and Croatian Ana Mandic were rewarded for their semi final positions with bronze medals.

== Results ==
1st round
(Kazakhstan) Valerija Kurluk	KO
(Estonia) Jana Mooses
(Serbia) Dajana Mandic
(Greece) Maria Konstantelou	D(3:0)
(Morocco) Mina Wahib	D(2:1)
(Austria) Andrea Murkovic

Quarter-finals
(Italy) Barbara Plazzoli	D(2:1)
(Chile) Carolina Rodrigues
(Slovakia) Jana Olejarova
(Kazakhstan) Valerija Kurluk	D(3:0)
(Croatia) Ana Mandic	D(3:0)
(Greece) Maria Konstantelou
(Morocco) Mina Wahib
(Russia) Fatima Bokova	D(2:1)

Semi-finals
(Italy) Barbara Plazzoli
(Kazakhstan) Valerija Kurluk	D(2:1)
(Croatia) Ana Mandic
(Russia) Fatima Bokova	TKO

Final
(Kazakhstan) Valerija Kurluk	D(2:1)
(Russia) Fatima Bokova

=== Key ===
Abbreviation	Meaning
D (3:0)	Decision (Unanimous)
D (2:1)	Decision (Split)
KO	Knockout
TKO	Technical Knockout

== See also ==
- List of WAKO Amateur World Championships
- List of WAKO Amateur European Championships
- List of female kickboxers
