= Women's K-1 at WAKO World Championships 2007 Belgrade -70 kg =

Kickboxing tournament

The women's heavyweight (70 kg/154 lbs) K-1 category at the W.A.K.O. World Championships 2007 in Belgrade was the second heaviest of the female K-1 tournaments. There were only four women from two continents (Europe and Africa), taking part in the competition. Each of the matches was three rounds of two minutes each and were fought under K-1 rules.

The tournament winner was Serbian Eva Halasi who defeated Moroccan Rabih Soukayna in the final to take the gold medal. Defeated semi finalists Belarusian Maryna Kalinina and Russian Ekaterina Rokunova received bronze medals.

== Results ==
Semi Finals		Final
(Belarus) Maryna Kalinina
(Serbia) Eva Halasi	WIN	(Serbia) Eva Halasi	WIN
(Morocco) Rabih Soukayna	WIN	(Morocco) Rabih Soukayna
(Russia) Ekaterina Rokunova

== See also ==
- List of WAKO Amateur World Championships
- List of WAKO Amateur European Championships
- List of female kickboxers
