= Men's Light-Contact at WAKO World Championships 2007 Belgrade -79 kg =

The men's 79 kg (173.8 lbs) Light-Contact category at the W.A.K.O. World Championships 2007 in Belgrade was the fifth heaviest of the male Light-Contact tournaments falling between middleweight and light heavyweight when compared to Low-Kick and K-1's weight classes. There were twenty-three men from three continents (Europe, Asia and Africa) taking part in the competition. Each of the matches was three rounds of two minutes each and were fought under Light-Contact rules.

Owing to the unequal number of fighters not suitable for a thirty-two man tournament, nine of the contestants had byes through to the second round. The tournament gold medalist was the Hungarian Zoltan Dancso who won gold by defeating the German Stefan Bücker by split decision. By virtue of reaching the semi-finals, Slovak Martin Navratil and Poland's Robert Matyja won bronze medals.

== Results ==
1st round
(Slovenia) Mirzad Vukalic
(United Kingdom) Nicholas Gardner	D(3:0)
(Iran) Armin Ghenaati Yeganeh
(South Africa) Mark Welvering	DEC(3:0)
(Slovakia) Martin Navratil	D(3:0)
(Austria) Bernhard Sussitz
(Sweden) Olle Blomquist	D(3:0)
(Switzerland) Toni Cerundolo
(Czech Republic) Jan Homolka
(Poland) Robert Matyja	D(3:0)
(North Macedonia) Slobodan Kajmakoski
(Croatia) Sanjin Dedic	D(3:0)
(Portugal) Hugo Matos
(Romania) Daniel Lazar	D(3:0)

2nd round
(Germany) Stefan Bücker	D(3:0)
(India) Mukeshar R. Chowdhury
(Russia) Ruslan Ishmakov	DQ
(United Kingdom) Nicholas Gardner
(Turkey) Volkan Karaduman	D(3:0)
(South Africa) Mark Welvering
(Republic of Ireland) Stewart Edgeworth
(Slovakia) Martin Navratil	D(3:0)
(Italy) Andrea Primitivi	D(3:0)
(Sweden) Olle Blomquist
(France) Mamadou Traore
(Poland) Robert Matyja	D(3:0)
(Ukraine) Ruslan Batrudtinov
(Croatia) Sanjin Dedic	D(3:0)
(Romania) Daniel Lazar
(Hungary) Zoltan Dancso	D(3:0)

Quarter-finals
(Germany) Stefan Bücker	D(2:1)
(Russia) Ruslan Ishmakov
(Turkey) Volkan Karaduman
(Slovakia) Martin Navratil	D(3:0)
(Italy) Andrea Primitivi
(Poland) Robert Matyja	D(2:1)
(Croatia) Sanjin Dedic
(Hungary) Zoltan Dancso	D(2:1)

Semi-finals
(Germany) Stefan Bücker	D(3:0)
(Slovakia) Martin Navratil
(Poland) Robert Matyja
(Hungary) Zoltan Dancso	D(3:0)

Final
(Germany) Stefan Bücker
(Hungary) Zoltan Dancso	D(2:1)

=== Key ===
Abbreviation	Meaning
D (3:0)	Decision (Unanimous)
D (2:1)	Decision (Split)
KO	Knockout
TKO	Technical Knockout
AB	Abandonment (Injury in match)
WO	Walkover (No fight)
DQ	Disqualification

== See also ==
- List of WAKO Amateur World Championships
- List of WAKO Amateur European Championships
- List of male kickboxers
