= Men's Low-Kick at WAKO World Championships 2007 Belgrade -75 kg =

The men's middleweight (75 kg/165 lbs) Low-Kick category at the W.A.K.O. World Championships 2007 in Belgrade was the fifth heaviest of the male Low-Kick tournaments, involving nineteen fighters from four continents (Europe, Asia, Africa and South America). Each of the matches was three rounds of two minutes each and were fought under Low-Kick rules.

Due to there being too few fighters for a tournament designed for thirty-two, thirteen of the fighters received a bye through to the second round. The tournament gold medalist was Croatian Marko Benzon who defeated France's Bakari Tounkara in the final by unanimous decision. Kazak Nurlan Nurgaliyev and Serbia's Dragan Micic claimed bronze medals.

== Results ==
1st Round
(Bosnia and Herzegovina) Dzemal Mahmic	KO
(Ukraine) Artur Danylevski
(France) Bakari Tounkara	D(3:0)
(North Macedonia) Martin Grozdanovski
(Brazil) Altaceste Baptista
(Azerbaijan) Kamil Sharifov	D(3:0)

2nd Round
(Poland) Leszek Koltun	D(3:0)
(Italy) Stefano Paone
(Kazakhstan) Nurlan Nurgaliyev	D(3:0)
(Kyrgyzstan) Alen Ofoio
(Croatia) Marko Benzon	D(3:0)
(Bosnia and Herzegovina) Dzemal Mahmic
(Egypt) Ahmed Megahed
(Bulgaria) Stilian Angelov	AB
(Austria) Jürgen Glatzer
(Russia) Mikhail Chalykh	D(3:0)
(Belarus) Heorhi Klim
(France) Bakari Tounkara	D(3:0)
(Portugal) Octavio Vasconcelos
(Azerbaijan) Kamil Sharifov	D(3:0)
(Greece) Antonios Karadimas
(Serbia) Dragan Micic	D(2:1)

Quarter Finals
(Poland) Leszek Koltun
(Kazakhstan) Nurlan Nurgaliyev	D(3:0)
(Croatia) Marko Benzon	D(3:0)
(Bulgaria) Stilian Angelov
(Russia) Mikhail Chalykh
(France) Bakari Tounkara	D(2:1)
(Azerbaijan) Kamil Sharifov
(Serbia) Dragan Micic	D(2:1)

Semi Finals
(Kazakhstan) Nurlan Nurgaliyev
(Croatia) Marko Benzon	D(3:0)
(France) Bakari Tounkara	D(2:1)
(Serbia) Dragan Micic

Final
(Croatia) Marko Benzon	D(3:0)
(France) Bakari Tounkara

=== Key ===
Abbreviation	Meaning
D (3:0)	Decision (Unanimous)
D (2:1)	Decision (Split)
KO	Knockout
AB	Abandonment (Injury in match)

== See also ==
- List of WAKO Amateur World Championships
- List of WAKO Amateur European Championships
- List of male kickboxers
