= Men's K-1 at WAKO World Championships 2007 Belgrade -67 kg =

Kickboxing tournament

The men's welterweight (67 kg/147.4 lbs) K-1 category at the W.A.K.O. World Championships 2007 in Belgrade was the fifth lightest of the K-1 tournaments, involving fourteen fighters from four continents (Europe, Asia, Africa and South America). Each of the matches was three rounds of two minutes each and were fought under K-1 rules.

As the competition did not have enough fighters for a sixteen-man tournament, two of the competitors had a bye through to the quarter-finals. The eventual gold medallist was Piotr Kobylanski from Poland who defeated Gor Shavelyan from Russia in the final. Defeated semi finalists Vitaliy Hubenko from Ukraine and Yauheni Vinahradau from Belarus received bronze medals.

== Results ==
1st round
(Bulgaria) Toma Tomov	WIN
(France) Traore Boubou
(Brazil) Diego David
(Poland) Piotr Kobylanski	WIN
(China) Jiang Tao Dong
(Morocco) Hicham Bettani	WIN
(Hungary) Jozsef Vulics]
(Serbia) Bojan Radovic	WIN
(Belarus) Yauheni Vinahradau	WIN
(Azerbaijan) Aras Pirmamadov
(Italy) Fabio Ambrosini
(Kyrgyzstan) Salidlan Arbuzov	WIN

Quarter-finals
(Ukraine) Vitaliy Hubenko	WIN
(Bulgaria) Toma Tomov
(Poland) Piotr Kobylanski	WIN
(Morocco) Hicham Bettani
(Russia) Gor Shavelyan	WIN
(Serbia) Bojan Radovic
(Belarus) Yauheni Vinahradau	WIN
(Kyrgyzstan) Salidlan Arbuzov

Semi-finals
(Ukraine) Vitaliy Hubenko
(Poland) Piotr Kobylanski	WIN
(Russia) Gor Shavelyan	WIN
(Belarus) Yauheni Vinahradau

Final
(Poland) Piotr Kobylanski	WIN
(Russia) Gor Shavelyan

== See also ==
- List of WAKO Amateur World Championships
- List of WAKO Amateur European Championships
- List of male kickboxers
