= Men's Light-Contact at WAKO World Championships 2007 Belgrade -84 kg =

The men's 84 kg (184.8 lbs) Light-Contact category at the W.A.K.O. World Championships 2007 in Belgrade was the fourth heaviest of the male Light-Contact tournaments falling between the light heavyweight and cruiserweight division when compared to Low-Kick and K-1 weight classes. There were nineteen men from three continents (Europe, Asia and Africa) taking part in the competition. Each of the matches was three rounds of two minutes each and were fought under Light-Contact rules.

As there were too few men for a thirty-two man tournament, thirteen of the fighters got a bye through to the second round. The tournament winner was Murat Pukhaev from Russia who defeated the German Christian Albrecht in the final by unanimous decision to claim gold. Defeated semi finalists Jeno Novak from Hungary and Mariusz Niziolek from Poland gained bronze medals.

== Results ==
1st Round
(United Kingdom) Andrew Gallagher
(Czech Republic) David Kostrouch | D(3:0)
(South Africa) Jannie Vreugdenburg
(Slovakia) Matej Visnai | D(2:1)
(France) Jonathan Cotteret
(Portugal) Pedro Correira | D(2:1)

2nd Round
(Poland) Mariusz Niziolek | D(2:1)
(Slovenia) Andrej Sande
(Italy) Gianluca Stitzer | D(3:0)
(Sweden) Joakim Sandblom
(Republic of Ireland) Cormac O'Connor
(Czech Republic) David Kostrouch | D(3:0)
(Ukraine) Roman Gudyma
(Russia) Murat Pukhaev | D(3:0)
(Turkey) Zafer Erturk | D(3:0)
(Austria) Gerald Zimmermann
(Germany) Christian Albrecht | D(3:0)
(Slovakia) Matej Visnai
(Croatia) Dejan Dedic | D(2:1)
(Portugal) Pedro Correira
(India) Sandeep Walia
(Hungary) Jeno Novak | D(3:0)

Quarter Finals
(Poland) Mariusz Niziolek | D(2:1)
(Italy) Gianluca Stitzer
(Czech Republic) David Kostrouch
(Russia) Murat Pukhaev | D(2:1)
(Turkey) Zafer Erturk
(Germany) Christian Albrecht | D(3:0)
(Croatia) Dejan Dedic
(Hungary) Jeno Novak | D(3:0)

Semi Finals
(Poland) Mariusz Niziolek
(Russia) Murat Pukhaev | D(3:0)
(Russia) Christian Albrecht | WO
(Hungary) Jeno Novak

Final
(Russia) Murat Pukhaev | D(3:0)
(Germany) Christian Albrecht

=== Key ===
| Abbreviation | Meaning |
|---|---|
| D (3:0) | Decision (Unanimous) |
| D (2:1) | Decision (Split) |
| WO | Walkover (No fight) |

== See also ==
- List of WAKO Amateur World Championships
- List of WAKO Amateur European Championships
- List of male kickboxers
