= Women's K-1 at WAKO World Championships 2007 Belgrade -52 kg =

Kickboxing tournament

The women's featherweight (52 kg/114.4 lbs) K-1 category at the W.A.K.O. World Championships 2007 in Belgrade was the lightest of the female K-1 tournaments. There were seven women from two continents (Europe and Africa) taking part in the competition. Each of the matches was three rounds of two minutes each and were fought under K-1 rules.

As there was one too few competitors for an eight-person tournament, one woman had a bye through to the semi-finals. The gold medal match was won by Rajaa Hajdaowi from Morocco who defeated Russia's Yulia El Skaya in the final. Defeated semi finalists Hungarian Eva Ott and Serbian Natasa Ninic made do with bronze medals.

== Results ==
Quarter-finals
(Israel) Adi Rotem
(Hungary) Eva Ott	WIN
(Russia) Yulia El Skaya	WIN
(Belarus) Tatsiana Siamchonak
(Italy) Stella Morelli
(Serbia) Natasa Ninic	WIN

Semi-finals
(Hungary) Eva Ott
(Russia) Yulia El Skaya	WIN
(Serbia) Natasa Ninic
(Morocco) Rajaa Hajdaowi	WIN

Final
(Russia) Yulia El Skaya
(Morocco) Rajaa Hajdaowi	WIN

== See also ==
- List of WAKO Amateur World Championships
- List of WAKO Amateur European Championships
- List of female kickboxers
