= Men's Hard Styles at WAKO World Championships 2007 Coimbra =

The men's 'Hard Styles' category involved twelve contestants from eight countries across two continents - Europe and North America. Each contestant went through seven performances (2 minutes each) with the totals added up at the end of the event. The gold medallist was Great Britain's Daniel Sterling, silver was awarded to the United States's Robert Andreozzi and bronze to Russian Andrey Bosak. All three of these men would also be joint runners up in the 'Hard Styles with Weapons' category, with Bosak claiming a gold and silver as well in the two 'Soft Styles' categories.

== Results ==
Position	Contestant	1	2	3	4	5	6	7	Total
1	Daniel Sterling (United Kingdom)	9,6	9,7	9,7	9,7	9,6	9,8	9,8	48,5
2	Robert Andreozzi (United States)	9,7	9,6	9,6	9,8	9,7	9,7	9,7	48,4
3	Andrey Bosak (Russia)	9,8	9,6	9,7	9,6	9,5	9,3	9,7	48,1
4	Jonas Petrik (Czech Republic)	9,6	9,5	9,6	9,7	9,4	9,4	9,5	47,6
5	Adam Smith (United Kingdom)	9,3	9,0	9,5	9,4	9,4	9,5	9,5	47,1
6	Marek Svitek (Czech Republic)	9,3	9,5	9,5	9,4	9,3	9,3	9,5	47,0
7	Leonardi Alberto (Italy)	9,2	9,2	9,6	9,4	9,3	8,9	9,6	46,7
8	Michael Moeller (Germany)	9,5	9,0	9,0	9,0	9,0	9,0	9,2	45,2
9	Eamon Lawler (Republic of Ireland)	9,1	8,8	9,0	9,0	9,0	8,9	9,3	45,0
10	Michael Fackl (Italy)	8,9	8,9	9,0	8,9	8,8	9,0	9,3	44,7
11	Andrey Savushkin (Russia)	8,0	8,0	8,0	8,0	8,0	8,0	8,0	40,0
12	Dwain Blair (Canada)	0,0	0,0	0,0	0,0	0,0	0,0	0,0	0,0

== See also ==
- List of WAKO Amateur World Championships
- List of WAKO Amateur European Championships
- List of male kickboxers
