= W.A.K.O. World Championships 2016 =

W.A.K.O. World Cadets & Juniors Championships 2016 (Dublin)
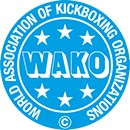
- The poster for W.A.K.O. World Cadets & Juniors Championships 2016 (Dublin)
- Promotion: W.A.K.O.
- Date: August 27 (Start); September 3, 2016 (End)
- City: (Republic of Ireland) Dublin, Ireland

W.A.K.O. World Cadets & Juniors Championships 2016 in Dublin were the joint 22nd edition of the W.A.K.O. world championships.

== Overall Medals Standing (Top 5) ==
Ranking	Country	Gold (gold)	Silver (silver)	Bronze (bronze)
1	Russia	57	39	34
2	(Republic of Ireland) Ireland	22	25	29
3	Italy	17	19	28
4	United Kingdom	16	7	18
5	Hungary	15	16	24

== See also ==
- List of WAKO Amateur World Championships
- List of WAKO Amateur European Championships
