= Men's Soft Styles Weapons at WAKO World Championships 2007 Coimbra =

The men's 'Soft Styles with Weapons' category involved just five contestants from four countries across three continents - Europe, Asia and North America. Each contestant went through seven performances (2 minutes each) with the totals added up at the end of the event. The gold medallist was Russian Evgeny Krylov claiming his second medal in Musical Forms, with compatriot Andrey Bosak gaining silver (and his fourth medal overall). Michael Moeller from Germany claimed bronze.

== Results ==
Position	Contestant	1	2	3	4	5	6	7	Total
1	Evgeny Krylov (Russia)	9,7	9,7	9,6	9,6	9,6	9,6	9,6	48,1
2	Andrey Bosak (Russia)	9,7	9,6	9,5	9,5	9,5	9,7	9,6	47,9
3	Michael Moeller (Germany)	9,4	9,5	9,5	9,5	9,5	9,5	9,6	47,5
4	Calvin Ross (United States)	9,0	9,0	8,9	9,1	9,1	9,1	9,2	45,3
5	K.C. Dakua (India)	0,0	0,0	0,0	0,0	0,0	0,0	0,0	0,0

== See also ==
- List of WAKO Amateur World Championships
- List of WAKO Amateur European Championships
- List of male kickboxers
