= Women's Soft Styles Weapons at WAKO World Championships 2007 Coimbra =

The women's 'Soft Styles with Weapons' category involved eight contestants from five countries across two continents - Europe and North America. Each contestant went through seven performances (2 minutes each) with the totals added up at the end of the event. The gold medal winner was Ekaterina Chizhikova from Russia with compatriot Elena Chirkova gaining silver. Veronika Dombrovskaya from Belarus claimed the bronze medal spot.

== Results ==
Position	Contestant	1	2	3	4	5	6	7	Total
1	Ekaterina Chizhikova (Russia)	9,8	9,5	9,7	9,7	9,7	9,6	9,5	48,2
2	Elena Chirkova (Russia)	9,6	9,6	9,6	9,7	9,5	9,4	9,6	48,0
3	Veronika Dombrovskaya (Belarus)	9,5	9,5	9,6	9,6	9,6	9,5	9,5	47,7
4	Daira Masharo (Belarus)	9,4	9,4	9,4	9,4	9,4	9,2	9,5	47,0
5	Kimberlee Ross (United States)	9,2	9,3	9,2	9,3	9,4	9,3	9,3	46,4
6	Clara Bonet Riera (Spain)	9,5	9,2	9,3	9,2	8,9	9,2	9,2	46,1
7	Helena Welz (Germany)	8,8	9,1	9,2	9,2	9,1	9,0	9,0	45,4
8	Rosaria Bonet Riera (Spain)	9,0	9,0	8,9	8,9	9,9	9,1	9,1	45,0

== See also ==
- List of WAKO Amateur World Championships
- List of WAKO Amateur European Championships
- List of female kickboxers
