= Men's Hard Styles Weapons at WAKO World Championships 2007 Coimbra =

The men's 'Hard Styles with Weapons' category involved seven contestants from five countries across two continents - Europe and North America. Each contestant went through seven performances (2 minutes each) with the totals added up at the end of the event. The gold medallist was Russian Andrey Savushkin who claimed his second individual gold medal in musical forms. Three fighters claimed silver medals - with American Robert Andreozzi, Brit Daniel Stirling and Russian Andrey Bosak. The bronze medal went to Germany's Michael Moeller.

== Results ==
Position	Contestant	1	2	3	4	5	6	7	Total
1	Andrey Savushkin (Russia)	9,8	9,5	9,7	9,7	9,7	9,3	9,7	48,3
2	Robert Andreozzi (United States)	9,6	9,6	9,5	9,7	9,5	9,8	9,7	48,1
2	Daniel Stirling (United Kingdom)	9,5	9,7	9,6	9,7	9,6	9,6	9,6	48,1
2	Andrey Bosak (Russia)	9,9	9,6	9,7	9,5	9,6	9,7	9,5	48,1
5	Michael Moeller (Germany)	9,2	9,6	9,4	9,4	9,4	9,4	9,4	47,0
6	David Busby (United Kingdom)	9,0	9,3	9,3	9,3	9,3	9,2	9,4	46,4
7	Filippo Fontana (Italy)	8,9	9,2	9,1	9,3	9,1	9,1	9,3	45,8

== See also ==
- List of WAKO Amateur World Championships
- List of WAKO Amateur European Championships
- List of male kickboxers
