= Women's Hard Styles Weapons at WAKO World Championships 2007 Coimbra =

The women's 'Hard Styles with Weapons' category involved thirteen contestants from eight countries across two continents - Europe and North America. Each contestant went through seven performances (2 minutes each) with the totals added up at the end of the event. The gold medal winner was Veronika Dombrovskaya from Belarus with compatriot Maria Pekarchik gaining silver. Ekaterina Chizhikova from Russia claimed the bronze medal spot.

== Results ==
Position	Contestant	1	2	3	4	5	6	7	Total
1	Veronika Dombrovskaya (Belarus)	9,8	9,4	9,6	9,6	9,8	9,7	9,5	48,2
2	Maria Pekarchik (Belarus)	9,6	9,5	9,6	9,5	9,6	9,6	9,5	47,8
3	Ekaterina Chizhikova (Russia)	9,7	9,5	9,6	9,5	9,4	9,4	9,4	47,4
4	Terri Jacoby (United States)	9,3	9,4	9,4	9,5	9,5	9,5	9,4	47,2
5	Isabelle Démosthène (Canada)	9,4	9,3	9,5	9,5	9,4	9,6	9,3	47,1
6	Anna Likhonina (Russia)	9,7	9,3	9,4	9,2	9,4	9,5	9,4	47,0
7	Jessica Holmes (United Kingdom)	9,3	9,3	9,4	9,4	9,5	9,4	9,2	46,8
8	Valeria Ziviani (Italy)	9,3	9,2	9,3	9,2	9,1	9,3	9,4	46,3
9	Judith Weck (Germany)	9,1	9,2	9,3	9,0	9,3	9,3	9,1	46,0
10	Amy Smith (United States)	9,1	9,1	9,2	9,0	9,1	9,2	9,0	45,5
11	Tanya Ledger (United Kingdom)	9,0	9,0	9,1	9,0	9,0	9,0	9,2	45,1
12	Anastasiya Ovod (Ukraine)	8,0	8,0	8,0	8,0	8,0	8,0	8,0	40,0
12	Victoria Marcotte (Canada)	8,0	8,0	8,0	8,0	8,0	8,0	8,0	40,0

== See also ==
- List of WAKO Amateur World Championships
- List of WAKO Amateur European Championships
- List of female kickboxers
