= Women's Soft Styles at WAKO World Championships 2007 Coimbra =

The women's 'Soft Styles' category involved nine contestants from six countries across two continents - Europe and North America. Each contestant went through seven performances (2 minutes each) with the totals added up at the end of the event. The gold medal winner was Veronika Dombrovskaya from Belarus, while Russian's Elena Chirkova and Inna Berestova claimed silver and bronze.

== Results ==
| Position | Contestant | 1 | 2 | 3 | 4 | 5 | 6 | 7 | Total |
|---|---|---|---|---|---|---|---|---|---|
| 1 | Veronika Dombrovskaya (Belarus) | 9,7 | 9,6 | 9,7 | 9,7 | 9,8 | 9,8 | 9,8 | 48,7 |
| 2 | Elena Chirkova (Russia) | 9,8 | 9,5 | 9,6 | 9,7 | 9,7 | 9,7 | 9,7 | 48,4 |
| 3 | Inna Berestova (Russia) | 9,6 | 9,5 | 9,6 | 9,8 | 9,6 | 9,6 | 9,6 | 48,0 |
| 4 | Daira Masharo (Belarus) | 9,4 | 9,4 | 9,4 | 9,4 | 9,5 | 9,3 | 9,5 | 47,1 |
| 5 | Kimberlee Ross (United States) | 9,3 | 9,3 | 9,4 | 9,4 | 9,4 | 9,5 | 9,5 | 47,0 |
| 6 | Luisa Gullotti (Italy) | 9,2 | 9,0 | 9,5 | 9,5 | 9,3 | 9,2 | 9,7 | 46,7 |
| 7 | Clara Bonet Riera (Spain) | 9,5 | 9,2 | 9,3 | 9,2 | 9,2 | 9,4 | 9,2 | 46,3 |
| 8 | Rosaria Bonet Riera (Spain) | 9,2 | 9,1 | 9,1 | 9,0 | 9,0 | 9,0 | 9,3 | 45,4 |
| 9 | Helena Welz (Germany) | 8,4 | 9,0 | 9,0 | 9,0 | 9,0 | 8,9 | 9,3 | 44,9 |

== See also ==
- List of WAKO Amateur World Championships
- List of WAKO Amateur European Championships
- List of female kickboxers
