= Men's Soft Styles at WAKO World Championships 2007 Coimbra =

The men's 'Soft Styles' category involved seven contestants from five countries across two continents - Europe and North America. Each contestant went through seven performances (2 minutes each) with the totals added up at the end of the event. The gold medallist was Russian Andrey Bosak who claimed his second individual gold medal in musical forms. The silver went to Germany's Michael Moeller and the bronze to Russia's Evgeny Krylov.

== Results ==
| Position | Contestant | 1 | 2 | 3 | 4 | 5 | 6 | 7 | Total |
|---|---|---|---|---|---|---|---|---|---|
| 1 | Andrey Bosak (Russia) | 9,8 | 9,7 | 9,7 | 9,7 | 9,7 | 9,7 | 9,6 | 48,5 |
| 2 | Michael Moeller (Germany) | 9,5 | 9,3 | 9,7 | 9,7 | 9,8 | 9,6 | 9,6 | 48,1 |
| 3 | Evgeny Krylov (Russia) | 9,7 | 9,6 | 9,5 | 9,6 | 9,6 | 9,4 | 9,5 | 47,8 |
| 4 | Alberto Leonardi (Italy) | 9,3 | 9,0 | 9,6 | 9,6 | 9,4 | 9,5 | 9,6 | 47,4 |
| 5 | Homayun Bayani (Germany) | 9,1 | 9,4 | 9,4 | 9,5 | 9,5 | 9,3 | 9,3 | 46,9 |
| 6 | Tom Karel (Czech Republic) | 9,1 | 9,3 | 9,1 | 9,2 | 9,1 | 9,1 | 9,0 | 45,6 |
| 7 | Calvin Ross (United States) | 8,8 | 9,2 | 9,0 | 9,2 | 9,0 | 9,2 | 9,0 | 45,4 |

== See also ==
- List of WAKO Amateur World Championships
- List of WAKO Amateur European Championships
- List of male kickboxers
