= W.A.K.O. World Championships (Dublin) 2015 =

W.A.K.O. World Championships 2015 (Dublin)
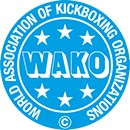
- The poster for W.A.K.O. World Championships 2015 (Dublin)
- Promotion: W.A.K.O.
- Date: November 21 (Start); November 28, 2015 (End)
- City: (Republic of Ireland) Dublin, Ireland

The WAKO World Championships 2015 for Point Fighting (PF), Light Contact (LC), Full Contact (FC), and Musical Forms (MF) were held in Dublin, Ireland, from 21 November to 28 November 2015. The competition was organized by the World Association of Kickboxing Organizations (WAKO).

== Disciplines ==
=== Point Fighting (PF) ===
A semi-contact discipline where fighters score points through fast, controlled techniques. Matches are frequently stopped after successful scoring actions.

=== Light Contact (LC) ===
A continuous semi-contact style focusing on speed, technical precision, and controlled exchanges without heavy impact.

=== Full Contact (FC) ===
A full-power fighting discipline where athletes compete using punches and kicks above the waist, aiming for victory by points, stoppage, or knockout.

=== Musical Forms (MF) ===
A performance-based discipline where athletes demonstrate choreographed martial arts routines, judged on technique, creativity, and presentation, often with or without weapons.

== Full Contact ==
=== Full Contact (Men) Medals Table ===
Event	Gold	Silver	Bronze
-51 kg	(Russia) Alexey Trifonov	(Kazakhstan) Nurdilda Yeraliyev	(Turkey) Sedat Demir
-51 kg	(Russia) Alexey Trifonov	(Kazakhstan) Nurdilda Yeraliyev	(Poland) Wojciech Peryt
-54 kg	(Russia) Ilnaz Sayfullin	(Turkey) Uzeyir Cukadar	(Italy) Marco Atzori
-54 kg	(Russia) Ilnaz Sayfullin	(Turkey) Uzeyir Cukadar	(Kazakhstan) Yerlan Shagban
-57 kg	(Germany) Johannes Wolf	(Russia) Astemir Borsov	(Kazakhstan) Ruslan Bayazitov
-57 kg	(Germany) Johannes Wolf	(Russia) Astemir Borsov	(Poland) Robert Niedzwiedzki
-60 kg	(Russia) Daniil Borozdin	(Jordan) Aday Abu Hason	(Slovakia) David Zold
-60 kg	(Russia) Daniil Borozdin	(Jordan) Aday Abu Hason	(Kazakhstan) Abzal Dyussupov
-63.5 kg	(Germany) Kian Golpira	(Russia) Alexander Popov	(Kyrgyzstan) Aibek Duishembiev
-63.5 kg	(Germany) Kian Golpira	(Russia) Alexander Popov	(Norway) Milton Barrios
-67 kg	(Russia) Maksim Prokofyev	(Italy) Matteo Calzuola	(Hungary) Gabor Gorbics
-67 kg	(Russia) Maksim Prokofyev	(Italy) Matteo Calzuola	(France) Dieter Leclercq
-71 kg	(France) Edouard Bernadou	(Russia) Echis Saryglar	(Turkey) Mukremin Guler
-71 kg	(France) Edouard Bernadou	(Russia) Echis Saryglar	(Slovenia) Gregor Stracanek
-75 kg	(Russia) Bashir Tazhdinov	(Poland) Robert Krason	(United States) Nathan Key
-75 kg	(Russia) Bashir Tazhdinov	(Poland) Robert Krason	(Kazakhstan) Sapar Tumanov
-81 kg	(Russia) Kayrat Nurmaganbetov	(Turkey) Serhat Degermenci	(Ukraine) Igor Prykhodko
-81 kg	(Russia) Kayrat Nurmaganbetov	(Turkey) Serhat Degermenci	(Bosnia and Herzegovina) Danijel Topalovic
-86 kg	(Poland) Mateusz Kubiszyn	(Russia) Igor Kopylov	(Turkey) Hasan Mert Kizil
-86 kg	(Poland) Mateusz Kubiszyn	(Russia) Igor Kopylov	(Germany) Konstantin Filatov
-91 kg	(Norway) Robert Paulsbyen	(Turkey) Ihya Olcuccu	(Russia) Islam Mutaliev
-91 kg	(Norway) Robert Paulsbyen	(Turkey) Ihya Olcuccu	(Canada) Michael Wiseman

=== Full Contact (Women) Medals Table ===
Event	Gold	Silver	Bronze
-48 kg	(Russia) Yulia Staforkina	(Poland) Ewa Bulanda	(Italy) Flavia Gasperini
-48 kg	(Russia) Yulia Staforkina	(Poland) Ewa Bulanda	(Turkey) Sevilay Tas
-52 kg	(Finland) Hanne Lauslehto	(Norway) Kristin Vollstad	(Turkey) Funda Alkayis
-52 kg	(Finland) Hanne Lauslehto	(Norway) Kristin Vollstad	(United Kingdom) Monika Markowska
-56 kg	(Hungary) Annamaria Bordas	(Slovakia) Veronika Petrikova	(Turkey) Ayse Ates
-56 kg	(Hungary) Annamaria Bordas	(Slovakia) Veronika Petrikova	(Russia) Valentina Filatova
-60 kg	(Norway) Thea Therese Naess	(Russia) Lilia Sharapova	(Finland) Jenna Puurunen
-60 kg	(Norway) Thea Therese Naess	(Russia) Lilia Sharapova	(France) Sara Surrel
-65 kg	(France) Madjene Laetitia	(Russia) Ksenia Miroshnichenko	(Italy) Cristina Caruso
-65 kg	(France) Madjene Laetitia	(Russia) Ksenia Miroshnichenko	(Slovakia) Veronika Cmarova
-70 kg	(Russia) Natalia Iurchenko	(Kazakhstan) Yekaterina Bratukhina	(Poland) Karolina Dziedzic
-70 kg	(Russia) Natalia Iurchenko	(Kazakhstan) Yekaterina Bratukhina	(Norway) Birgit Reitan Oksnes

== Light Contact ==
=== Men ===
Event	Gold	Silver	Bronze
-57 kg	(Republic of Ireland) Rustic Ivanchuk	(Turkey) Cebrail Gencoglu	(Russia) Aleksandr Lebedev
-57 kg	(Republic of Ireland) Rustic Ivanchuk	(Turkey) Cebrail Gencoglu	(Spain) Mario Rubio Lorenzana
-63 kg	(Republic of Ireland) Rhyan Shelley	(Russia) Aleksandr Bakirov	(Tajikistan) Alisher Akhmedov
-63 kg	(Republic of Ireland) Rhyan Shelley	(Russia) Aleksandr Bakirov	(Turkey) Ahmet Din
-69 kg	(Republic of Ireland) Des Leonard	(Italy) Giorgian Cimpeanu	(Russia) Vrezh Petrosian
-69 kg	(Republic of Ireland) Des Leonard	(Italy) Giorgian Cimpeanu	(Ukraine) Mykyta Orlov
-74 kg	(Russia) Shamil Khezh	(Italy) Luca Padoan	(Austria) Levente Bertalan
-74 kg	(Russia) Shamil Khezh	(Italy) Luca Padoan	(Guatemala) Andres Garcia
-79 kg	(Bulgaria) Emanuil Dimitrov	(Russia) Alexandr Verner	(Germany) Colin Adolfs
-79 kg	(Bulgaria) Emanuil Dimitrov	(Russia) Alexandr Verner	(Poland) Lukasz Wichowski
-84 kg	(Russia) Denis Martsevich	(Bulgaria) Duke Nwamerue	(Croatia) Tibor Iles
-84 kg	(Russia) Denis Martsevich	(Bulgaria) Duke Nwamerue	(Republic of Ireland) Thomas Hayden
-89 kg	(Russia) Ildar Gabbasov	(Ukraine) Artem Belov	(Slovenia) David Zibrat
-89 kg	(Russia) Ildar Gabbasov	(Ukraine) Artem Belov	(Hungary) Zoltan Dancso
-94 kg	(Russia) Sergey Ponomarev	(Slovenia) Admir Sinanbegovic	(Germany) Mike Hofer
-94 kg	(Russia) Sergey Ponomarev	(Slovenia) Admir Sinanbegovic	(Turkey) Emrah Alioglu
+94 kg	(Russia) Filipp Salugin	(Poland) Aleksander Stawirej	(Republic of Ireland) Dalton Shaughnessy
+94 kg	(Russia) Filipp Salugin	(Poland) Aleksander Stawirej	(Slovenia) Ales Lorber

=== Women ===
Event	Gold	Silver	Bronze
-50 kg	(Republic of Ireland) Lily de la Cour	(Italy) Cristiana Forin	(Russia) Anzhela Khakimzynova
-50 kg	(Republic of Ireland) Lily de la Cour	(Italy) Cristiana Forin	(Greece) Alexandra Seremeti
-55 kg	(Poland) Dorota Godzina	(Hungary) Gabriella Busa	(Germany) Nadine Kürten
-55 kg	(Poland) Dorota Godzina	(Hungary) Gabriella Busa	(Austria) Sonja Stacher
-60 kg	(Poland) Paulina Jarzmik	(Italy) Luna Mendy	(Republic of Ireland) Aine Leonard
-60 kg	(Poland) Paulina Jarzmik	(Italy) Luna Mendy	(Russia) Marina Popova
-65 kg	(United Kingdom) Natasha Baldwin	(Norway) Madelen Softeland	(Russia) Natalia Babaeva
-65 kg	(United Kingdom) Natasha Baldwin	(Norway) Madelen Softeland	(Hungary) Vivien Wagner
-70 kg	(Croatia) Ana Znaor	(Republic of Ireland) Lauren Bradshaw	(Russia) Mariia Deloglan
-70 kg	(Croatia) Ana Znaor	(Republic of Ireland) Lauren Bradshaw	(Slovenia) Ursa Terdin
+70 kg	(Netherlands) Nina Meppelder	(Italy) Giulia Compagno	(United Kingdom) Gaynor Morgan
+70 kg	(Netherlands) Nina Meppelder	(Italy) Giulia Compagno	(Russia) Anastasia Solodkova

== Point Fighting ==
=== Women ===
Event	Gold	Silver	Bronze
-50 kg	(Italy) Giulia Cavallaro	(Norway) Monica Engeset	(Republic of Ireland) Bo Mangan
-50 kg	(Italy) Giulia Cavallaro	(Norway) Monica Engeset	(Croatia) Lucija Cicvara
-55 kg	(Italy) Roberta Cavallaro	(Greece) Evita Viltanioti	(Republic of Ireland) Caradh O'Donovan
-55 kg	(Italy) Roberta Cavallaro	(Greece) Evita Viltanioti	(United Kingdom) Aston Cook
-60 kg	(Belgium) Neyens Evelyn	(Italy) Luisa Gullotti	(Hungary) Dorina Szabo
-60 kg	(Belgium) Neyens Evelyn	(Italy) Luisa Gullotti	(Republic of Ireland) Shauna Bannon
-65 kg	(United Kingdom) Natasha Baldwin	(Italy) Elena Pantaleo	(Hungary) Adrienn Kadas
-65 kg	(United Kingdom) Natasha Baldwin	(Italy) Elena Pantaleo	(Germany) Katharina Flieser
-70 kg	(Hungary) Henrietta Nagy	(United Kingdom) Gemma Upfold	(Turkey) Dilek Dumanli
-70 kg	(Hungary) Henrietta Nagy	(United Kingdom) Gemma Upfold	(United States) Nicole Pelland
+70 kg	(Hungary) Anna Kondar	(Italy) Deborah De Vita	(United Kingdom) Gaynor Morgan
+70 kg	(Hungary) Anna Kondar	(Italy) Deborah De Vita	(Netherlands) Nina Meppelder

=== Men ===
Event	Gold	Silver	Bronze
-57 kg	(Hungary) Roland Veres	(Republic of Ireland) Dylan Heffernan	(Russia) Maxim Fadeev
-57 kg	(Hungary) Roland Veres	(Republic of Ireland) Dylan Heffernan	(Italy) Vincenzo Gagliardi
-63 kg	(Russia) Viacheslav Shcherbakov	(Hungary) Richard Veres	(Italy) Davide Colla
-63 kg	(Russia) Viacheslav Shcherbakov	(Hungary) Richard Veres	(United Kingdom) Sam Sparks
-69 kg	(Italy) Ennio Giordano	(Belgium) Ramael Nick	(Germany) Timmy Sarantoudis
-69 kg	(Italy) Ennio Giordano	(Belgium) Ramael Nick	(Hungary) Roland Kiss
-74 kg	(United States) Jack Felton	(Slovenia) Tilen Zajc	(Italy) Daniele Farina
-74 kg	(United States) Jack Felton	(Slovenia) Tilen Zajc	(Germany) Sascha Gräske
-79 kg	(Bulgaria) Emanuil Dimitrov	(Republic of Ireland) Dean Barry	(Hungary) Laszlo Gombos
-79 kg	(Bulgaria) Emanuil Dimitrov	(Republic of Ireland) Dean Barry	(Greece) Triantafyllos Efthathiou
-84 kg	(Hungary) Zsolt Moradi	(Republic of Ireland) Robbie McMenamy	(Italy) Roberto Guiducci
-84 kg	(Hungary) Zsolt Moradi	(Republic of Ireland) Robbie McMenamy	(Greece) Stefanos Zoto
-89 kg	(United States) Raymond Daniels	(Austria) Roman Bründl	(Republic of Ireland) Andy Brett
-89 kg	(United States) Raymond Daniels	(Austria) Roman Bründl	(Slovenia) Erik Zorn
-94 kg	(Hungary) Tamas Imre	(United States) Julio Lugo	(Austria) Alexander Federer
-94 kg	(Hungary) Tamas Imre	(United States) Julio Lugo	(Italy) Paolo Niceforo
+94 kg	(Hungary) Krisztian Jaroszkievicz	(Germany) Erdogan Celik	(Austria) Peter Ertl
+94 kg	(Hungary) Krisztian Jaroszkievicz	(Germany) Erdogan Celik	(United Kingdom) Chris Aston
Team Fight	Hungary	Germany	(United States) USA
Team Fight	Hungary	Germany	Greece

== Musical Forms ==
=== Musical Forms (Men & Women) ===
Event	Gold	Silver	Bronze
Women HS	(Russia) Anastasia Belyuchenko	(Ukraine) Kristina Skripnichenko	(Republic of Ireland) Jessica Grant
Women SS	(Belarus) Veronika Dombrouskaya	(Russia) Inna Berestovaya	(Russia) Anna Samygina
Men HS	(United States) Tyler Weaver	(France) Kevin Cetout	(Russia) Roman Chizhov
Men SS	(Russia) Ivan Baev	(Russia) Linar Bagautdinov	(Chile) Matias Munoz Troncoso

== Overall Medals Standing (Top 7) ==
Ranking	Country	Gold (gold)	Silver (silver)	Bronze (bronze)
1	Russia	19	12	15
2	Hungary	10	4	7
3	(Republic of Ireland) Ireland	6	7	4
4	(United Kingdom) Great Britain	6	2	9
5	United States	6	2	4
6	Italy	5	13	13
7	Germany	4	3	13

== See also ==
- List of WAKO Amateur World Championships
- List of WAKO Amateur European Championships
