= W.A.K.O. World Championships (Antalya) 2013 =

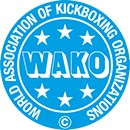
- The poster for W.A.K.O. World Championships (Antalya) 2013
- Promotion: W.A.K.O.
- Date: December 2013
- City: Antalya, Turkey

Event chronology
W.A.K.O. World Championships 2013 (Brazil)	W.A.K.O. World Championships (Antalya) 2013	W.A.K.O. World Championships 2015 (Dublin)

W.A.K.O. World Championships 2013 in Antalya were held at the Maritim Pine resort in Antalya, Turkey from Monday, November 30 to Sunday, December 8, 2013.

== Disciplines ==
=== Point Fighting (PF) ===
A semi-contact discipline where fighters score points through fast, controlled techniques. Matches are frequently stopped after successful scoring actions.

=== Light Contact (LC) ===
A continuous semi-contact style focusing on speed, technical precision, and controlled exchanges without heavy impact.

=== Full Contact (FC) ===
A full-power fighting discipline where athletes compete using punches and kicks above the waist, aiming for victory by points, stoppage, or knockout.

=== Musical Forms (MF) ===
A performance-based discipline where athletes demonstrate choreographed martial arts routines, judged on technique, creativity, and presentation, often with or without weapons.

== Full Contact ==
=== Men ===
Event	Gold	Silver	Bronze
-51 kg	(Russia) Aleksei Trifonov	(Poland) Wojciech Peryt	(Morocco) Farid Boulasdal
-51 kg	(Russia) Aleksei Trifonov	(Poland) Wojciech Peryt	(Kazakhstan) Eraliyev Nurdila
-54 kg	(Russia) Ilnaz Sayfullin	(Poland) Daniel Zaboklicki	(Italy) Marco Atzori
-54 kg	(Russia) Ilnaz Sayfullin	(Poland) Daniel Zaboklicki	(Kyrgyzstan) Ulanbek Kasymbekov
-57 kg	(Kazakhstan) Bauyrzhan Kudaibergenov	(Russia) Alexandr Shamray	(Italy) Roberto Pizzigalli
-57 kg	(Kazakhstan) Bauyrzhan Kudaibergenov	(Russia) Alexandr Shamray	(Jordan) Amad Aljarajreh
-60 kg	(Kazakhstan) Abzal Duysupa	(Russia) Vasilii Zaitsev	(Azerbaijan) Eduard Mammadov
-60 kg	(Kazakhstan) Abzal Duysupa	(Russia) Vasilii Zaitsev	(Slovakia) David Zold
-63.5 kg	(Russia) Sergey Lipinets	(Azerbaijan) Elnur Daryagir	(Kyrgyzstan) Aibek Duishembiev
-63.5 kg	(Russia) Sergey Lipinets	(Azerbaijan) Elnur Daryagir	(Italy) Giuseppe Di Cuia
-67 kg	(Russia) Maksim Prokofyev	(Kazakhstan) Ersaiyn Kassambayev	(Denmark) Nickolaj Christensen
-67 kg	(Russia) Maksim Prokofyev	(Kazakhstan) Ersaiyn Kassambayev	(Turkmenistan) Mekan Amanov
-71 kg	(Kazakhstan) Sayan Zhakupov	(Russia) Nikita Selyanskiy	(Hungary) Zoltán Laszák
-71 kg	(Kazakhstan) Sayan Zhakupov	(Russia) Nikita Selyanskiy	(Germany) Ufuk Seven
-75 kg	(France) Edouard Bernadou	(United States) Nathan Key	(Kazakhstan) Stelyan Avramidi
-75 kg	(France) Edouard Bernadou	(United States) Nathan Key	(Tunisia) Hamdi Hadia
-81 kg	(Ukraine) Igor Prykhodko	(Kazakhstan) Azamat Nurpeyisov	(Kyrgyzstan) Kumar Zhaliev
-81 kg	(Ukraine) Igor Prykhodko	(Kazakhstan) Azamat Nurpeyisov	(Italy) Gianluca Stitzer
-86 kg	(Georgia (country)) Khvicha Qoqashvili	(Croatia) Bojan Miškovic	(Russia) Ian Petrovich
-86 kg	(Georgia (country)) Khvicha Qoqashvili	(Croatia) Bojan Miškovic	(Algeria) Kermia Boudjema
-91 kg	(Germany) Eugen Waigel	(Ukraine) Stas Kutin	(Kazakhstan) Zarhar Vorobeyi
-91 kg	(Germany) Eugen Waigel	(Ukraine) Stas Kutin	(Canada) Robert Wiseman
+91 kg	(Croatia) Tomislav Cikotic	(Ukraine) Ivan Tkachenko	(Turkey) Yusuf Acik
+91 kg	(Croatia) Tomislav Cikotic	(Ukraine) Ivan Tkachenko	(Poland) Jakub Kozera

=== Women ===
Event	Gold	Silver	Bronze
-48 kg	(Russia) Viktoriya Miftieva	(Turkey) Sukran Tebaa Onar	(Kazakhstan) Nurzhainat Yelubayeva
-48 kg	(Russia) Viktoriya Miftieva	(Turkey) Sukran Tebaa Onar	(Poland) Ewa Bulanda
-52 kg	(Norway) Marielle Hansen	(Turkey) Yeliz Koblay	(Republic of Ireland) Orla O'Brien
-52 kg	(Norway) Marielle Hansen	(Turkey) Yeliz Koblay	(Russia) Irina Parakhina
-56 kg	(Germany) Jessica Heymann	(Slovakia) Veronika Petrikova	(Poland) Dorota Godzina
-56 kg	(Germany) Jessica Heymann	(Slovakia) Veronika Petrikova	(Turkey) Meltem Bas
-60 kg	(Norway) Thea Therese Naess	(Poland) Kinga Siwa	(Russia) Natalia Kamenskikh
-60 kg	(Norway) Thea Therese Naess	(Poland) Kinga Siwa	(Finland) Camilla Viksten
-65 kg	(Norway) Cathrine Heggoy Fonnes	(Russia) Ksenia Miroshnichenko	(Slovakia) Veronika Cmarova
-65 kg	(Norway) Cathrine Heggoy Fonnes	(Russia) Ksenia Miroshnichenko	(Finland) Anne Katas
-70 kg	(Norway) Birgit Reitan Oksnes	(Germany) Claudia Kiontke	(Hungary) Boglarka Brunner
-70 kg	(Norway) Birgit Reitan Oksnes	(Germany) Claudia Kiontke	(Russia) Irina Gavrilova
+70 kg	(Russia) Diana Galina	(Morocco) Siham Alali	(Bosnia and Herzegovina) Adna Stambolic
+70 kg	(Russia) Diana Galina	(Morocco) Siham Alali	(South Africa) Adele Rootman

== Light Contact ==
=== Men ===
Event	Gold	Silver	Bronze
-57 kg	(Tajikistan) Alisher Akhmedov	(Hungary) Norbert Rizmayer	(Turkey) Fatih Mehmet Sahin
-57 kg	(Tajikistan) Alisher Akhmedov	(Hungary) Norbert Rizmayer	(Italy) Davide Peano
-63 kg	(Russia) Aleksandr Bakirov	(Republic of Ireland) Dessie Leonard	(Poland) Michal Szulwic
-63 kg	(Russia) Aleksandr Bakirov	(Republic of Ireland) Dessie Leonard	(Italy) Damiano Tramontana
-69 kg	(Italy) Giorgian Cimpeanu	(Slovenia) Nejc Gazvoda	(Ukraine) Pavlo Zamyatin
-74 kg	(Austria) Levente Bertalan	(Russia) Alexey Lenberg	(United Kingdom) Jumaane Camero
-74 kg	(Austria) Levente Bertalan	(Russia) Alexey Lenberg	(Croatia) Marko Opšivac
-79 kg	(Bulgaria) Emanuil Dimitrov	(Ukraine) Ivan Gryschuk	(France) Duval Brice
-79 kg	(Bulgaria) Emanuil Dimitrov	(Ukraine) Ivan Gryschuk	(Russia) Aivar Gafurov
-84 kg	(Bulgaria) Duk Nuamereu	(Russia) Sergey Zhukov	(Slovakia) Matej Engler
-84 kg	(Bulgaria) Duk Nuamereu	(Russia) Sergey Zhukov	(Germany) Stephan Bücker
-89 kg	(Germany) Fabian Fingerhut	(Hungary) Zoltán Dancsó	(Austria) Juso Prosic
-89 kg	(Germany) Fabian Fingerhut	(Hungary) Zoltán Dancsó	(Italy) Domenico Pappaceno
-94 kg	(Croatia) Boris Miškovic	(Italy) Fabio Panizzolo	(Russia) Igor Kopylov
-94 kg	(Croatia) Boris Miškovic	(Italy) Fabio Panizzolo	(Slovenia) Ales Lorber
+94 kg	(Croatia) Zvonimir Cikotic	(Germany) Baris Kilic	(Russia) Andrey Batyaev
+94 kg	(Croatia) Zvonimir Cikotic	(Germany) Baris Kilic	(France) Broche Sylvain

=== Women ===
Event	Gold	Silver	Bronze
-50 kg	(Slovenia) Stasa Lubej	(Russia) Anastasiia Grinevich	(Austria) Lisa Kössler
-50 kg	(Slovenia) Stasa Lubej	(Russia) Anastasiia Grinevich	(France) Florence Zaboula
-55 kg	(Ukraine) Kateryna Solovei	(Turkey) Ayse Ates	(Republic of Ireland) Sinead Beasley
-55 kg	(Ukraine) Kateryna Solovei	(Turkey) Ayse Ates	(Bulgaria) Amalia Koleva
-60 kg	(Austria) Nadja Reinegger	(Germany) Maneka Kissel	(Slovakia) Lucia Cmarova
-60 kg	(Austria) Nadja Reinegger	(Germany) Maneka Kissel	(Italy) Lisa Adorni
-65 kg	(Austria) Nicole Trimmel	(Norway) Madelen Softeland	(United Kingdom) Karen Bailey
-65 kg	(Austria) Nicole Trimmel	(Norway) Madelen Softeland	(Switzerland) Sabrina Elmiger
-70 kg	(Croatia) Ana Znaor	(Sweden) Karin Edenius	(Russia) Mariia Deloglan
-70 kg	(Croatia) Ana Znaor	(Sweden) Karin Edenius	(Italy) Roberta Cargno
+70 kg	(Italy) Diletta Faiola	(Croatia) Andrea Ivas	(Slovenia) Nedina Toric
+70 kg	(Italy) Diletta Faiola	(Croatia) Andrea Ivas	(United Kingdom) Gaynor Morgan

== Kick Light ==
=== Men ===
Event	Gold	Silver	Bronze
-51 kg	(Russia) Ilnaz Sayfullin	(Poland) Daniel Zaboklicki	(Morocco) Farid Boulasdal
-51 kg	(Russia) Ilnaz Sayfullin	(Poland) Daniel Zaboklicki	(Kazakhstan) Eraliyev Nurdila
-54 kg	(Russia) Aleksei Trifonov	(Italy) Marco Atzori	(Kyrgyzstan) Ulanbek Kasymbekov
-54 kg	(Russia) Aleksei Trifonov	(Italy) Marco Atzori	(Kazakhstan) Eraliyev Nurdila
-57 kg	(Kyrgyzstan) Avazbek Amanbekov	(Turkey) Omer Faruk Avci	(Turkey) Mustafa Demirel
-57 kg	(Kyrgyzstan) Avazbek Amanbekov	(Turkey) Omer Faruk Avci	(Poland) Kacper Narloch
-63 kg	(Russia) Ramis Abdullin	(Turkey) Murat Antepli	(Poland) Cyprian Grzeda
-63 kg	(Russia) Ramis Abdullin	(Turkey) Murat Antepli	(Poland) Maciej Dominczak
-69 kg	(Ukraine) Volodymyr Demchuk	(Russia) Rustam Mirzoev	(Slovakia) Jaroslav Pasa
-69 kg	(Ukraine) Volodymyr Demchuk	(Russia) Rustam Mirzoev	(Italy) LUCA Mameli
-74 kg	(Poland) Kamil Ruta	(Poland) Jerzy Wronski	(Turkey) Mustafa Demirel
-74 kg	(Poland) Kamil Ruta	(Poland) Jerzy Wronski	(Slovakia) Viliam Vanta
-79 kg	(Slovenia) Dejan Vajs	(Latvia) Pavels Haritonovs	(Turkey) Sahin Aras
-79 kg	(Slovenia) Dejan Vajs	(Latvia) Pavels Haritonovs	(Turkey) Yahya Alemdag
-84 kg	(Slovenia) Jan Softic	(Israel) Hani Khalil	(Russia) Aleksei Kravchenko
-84 kg	(Slovenia) Jan Softic	(Israel) Hani Khalil	(Italy) Luca Mameli
-89 kg	(Turkey) Ibrahim Telli	(Italy) Giovanni Balzano	(Poland) Michal Wszelak
-89 kg	(Turkey) Ibrahim Telli	(Italy) Giovanni Balzano	(Slovakia) Jaroslav Pasa
-94 kg	(Ukraine) Artem Vasylenko	(Russia) Sergei Ponomarev	(Poland) Maciej Dominczak
-94 kg	(Ukraine) Artem Vasylenko	(Russia) Sergei Ponomarev	(Latvia) Reinis Porozovs
+94 kg	(Ukraine) Ivan Vasylenko	(Italy) Giovanni Balzano	(Slovenia) Marjan Bolhar
+94 kg	(Ukraine) Ivan Vasylenko	(Italy) Giovanni Balzano	(Slovakia) Jaroslav Pasa

=== Women ===
Event	Gold	Silver	Bronze
-50 kg	(Turkey) Funda Tiken	(Turkey) Hamdusena Cinar	(Poland) Zaneta Ciesla
-50 kg	(Turkey) Funda Tiken	(Turkey) Hamdusena Cinar	(Morocco) Soukaina Haddoubi
-55 kg	(Italy) Nicole Perona	(Austria) Doris Köhler	(Slovenia) Nina Gorisek
-55 kg	(Italy) Nicole Perona	(Austria) Doris Köhler	(Bulgaria) Amaliya Koleva
-60 kg	(Bulgaria) Albena Sitnilska	(Czech Republic) Lucie Mlejnkova	(Poland) Paulina Frankowska
-60 kg	(Bulgaria) Albena Sitnilska	(Czech Republic) Lucie Mlejnkova	(Finland) Camilla Viksten
-65 kg	(Italy) Adriana Tricoci	(Czech Republic) Veronika Kohutova	(Russia) Valentina Nikitenko
-65 kg	(Italy) Adriana Tricoci	(Czech Republic) Veronika Kohutova	(France) Angelique Pitiot
-70 kg	(Poland) Marta Waliczek	(Russia) Olga Polovnikova	(Russia) Elina Gismeeva
-70 kg	(Poland) Marta Waliczek	(Russia) Olga Polovnikova	(Italy) Cristina Caruso
+70 kg	(Italy) Giulia Compagno	(Tajikistan) Zuhro Kholova	(Bosnia and Herzegovina) Adna Stambolic
+70 kg	(Italy) Giulia Compagno	(Tajikistan) Zuhro Kholova	(Russia) Anastasiia Shakhina

== Point Fighting ==
=== Men ===
Event	Gold	Silver	Bronze
-57 kg	(Italy) Vincenzo Gagliardi	(Republic of Ireland) Sean Brennan	(Russia) Maxim Fadeev
-57 kg	(Italy) Vincenzo Gagliardi	(Republic of Ireland) Sean Brennan	(Hungary) Roland Kiss
-63 kg	(Italy) Adriano Passaro	(Hungary) Richárd Veres	(Belgium) Wout De Backer
-63 kg	(Italy) Adriano Passaro	(Hungary) Richárd Veres	(Republic of Ireland) Dessie Leonard
-69 kg	(Italy) Davide Sfulcini	(Germany) Timmy Sarantoudis	(United Kingdom) Thomas Banks
-69 kg	(Italy) Davide Sfulcini	(Germany) Timmy Sarantoudis	(Belgium) Ramael Nick
-74 kg	(Hungary) Laszló Gömbös	(Slovenia) Jaka Hudales	(United Kingdom) Blaine Watson
-74 kg	(Hungary) Laszló Gömbös	(Slovenia) Jaka Hudales	(Russia) Egor Ryabchikov
-79 kg	(Republic of Ireland) Dean Barry	(Italy) Marco Nordio	(United Kingdom) Jack Evans
-79 kg	(Republic of Ireland) Dean Barry	(Italy) Marco Nordio	(Bulgaria) Emanuil Dimitrov
-84 kg	(Hungary) Zsolt Mórádi	(Republic of Ireland) Robbie McMenamy	(Bulgaria) Petar Zhivkov
-84 kg	(Hungary) Zsolt Mórádi	(Republic of Ireland) Robbie McMenamy	(Greece) Dimosthenis-Alexandros Sianiotis
-89 kg	(Hungary) Krisztián Jároszkievicz	(Germany) Alexander Gleixner	(Norway) Erik Brodreskift
-89 kg	(Hungary) Krisztián Jároszkievicz	(Germany) Alexander Gleixner	(Russia) Stepan Trofimov
-94 kg	(Russia) Alexander Bobrov	(Hungary) Márton Murvai	(Turkey) Cihat Ari
-94 kg	(Russia) Alexander Bobrov	(Hungary) Márton Murvai	(Italy) Paolo Niceforo
+94 kg	(Switzerland) Michel Decian	(United Kingdom) David Firth	(Republic of Ireland) James O'Connor
+94 kg	(Switzerland) Michel Decian	(United Kingdom) David Firth	(Croatia) Boris Miškovic
Team Fight	Team Hungary	Team Italy	(United Kingdom) Team Great Britain
Team Fight	Team Hungary	Team Italy	Team Germany

=== Women ===
Event	Gold	Silver	Bronze
-50 kg	(Italy) Giulia Cavallaro	(Norway) Monica Engeset	(Hungary) Mercédesz Veres
-50 kg	(Italy) Giulia Cavallaro	(Norway) Monica Engeset	(United Kingdom) Sharon Gill
-55 kg	(Greece) Efthymia Viltanioti	(Poland) Emilia Szablowska	(Republic of Ireland) Caradh O'Donovan
-55 kg	(Greece) Efthymia Viltanioti	(Poland) Emilia Szablowska	(Italy) Roberta Cavallaro
-60 kg	(Italy) Luisa Gullotti	(Republic of Ireland) Shauna Bannon	(Hungary) Nelly Hanicz
-60 kg	(Italy) Luisa Gullotti	(Republic of Ireland) Shauna Bannon	(Belgium) Neyens Evelyn
-65 kg	(Hungary) Adrienn Kádas	(Italy) Antonella Esposito	(United Kingdom) Natasha Walker
-65 kg	(Hungary) Adrienn Kádas	(Italy) Antonella Esposito	(Norway) Ina Grindheim
-70 kg	(Hungary) Henrietta Nagy	(Russia) Maria Semenova	(Italy) Deborah De Vita
-70 kg	(Hungary) Henrietta Nagy	(Russia) Maria Semenova	(Canada) Jordan Ferguson
+70 kg	(Hungary) Anna Kondár	(Russia) Daria Merkulova	(Austria) Helena Andic
+70 kg	(Hungary) Anna Kondár	(Russia) Daria Merkulova	(United Kingdom) Gaynor Morgan

== Musical Forms ==
=== Men ===
Event	Gold	Silver	Bronze
Soft Style (Weapons)	Nikita Pavlov (Russia)	Ivan Baev (Russia)	Alexandre Mair (Germany)
Hard Style (Weapons)	Nikita Tsyganok (Russia)	Denis Gavrilov (Russia)	Caleb Howard (South Africa)
Soft Style (Open Hand)	Linar Bagautdinov (Russia)	Ivan Baev (Russia)	
Hard Style (Open Hand)	Kevin Cetout (France)	Nikita Tsyganok (Russia)	Alberto Leonardi (Italy)

=== Women ===
Event	Gold	Silver	Bronze
Soft Style (Weapons)	Inna Berestovaya (Russia)	Ekaterina Tuvaeva (Russia)	Darya Masharo (Belarus)
Hard Style (Weapons)	Kristina Skripnichenko (Ukraine)	Olga Kuskova (Russia)	Kateryna Petenova (Ukraine)
Soft Style (Open Hand)	Veronica Dombrovskaya (Belarus)	Inna Berestovaya (Russia)	Ekaterina Tuvaeva (Russia)
Hard Style (Open Hand)	Elena Chirkova (Russia)	Olga Kuskova (Russia)	Inoka Skjonhaug (Norway)

== Overall Medals Standing (Top 5) ==
Ranking	Country	Gold (gold)	Silver (silver)	Bronze (bronze)
1	Italy	16	7	14
2	Russia	9	12	18
3	Hungary	7	5	7
4	Germany	4	5	6
5	Ukraine	4	3	1
