= W.A.K.O. World Cadets & Juniors Championships 2018 (Jesolo) =

Martial arts competition

2018 WAKO World Cadet & Juniors Kickboxing Championships
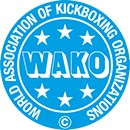
- Venue: Palazzo del Turismo
- Location: Jesolo, Italy
- Start date: 15 September
- End date: 23 September
- Nations: 64

The 2018 WAKO World Cadet & Juniors Kickboxing Championships was held at the Palazzo del Turismo in Jesolo, Italy and took place between 15 and 23 September 2018. Fighters between 10 and 18 years old of age, coming from 64 countries competed in all the kickboxing disciplines, three ring sports (Full contact, Low Kick and K-1) and four tatami sports (Point Fighting, Light Contact, Kick Light and Musical Forms).

== Overall Medals Standing (Top 5) ==
The top nation at the 2018 WAKO World Cadet & Juniors Kickboxing Championships in Jesolo (Italy) was Russia.

Ranking	Country	Gold (gold)	Silver (silver)	Bronze (bronze)
1	Russia	73	59	38
2	Hungary	19	17	28
3	Italy	17	15	29
4	(Republic of Ireland) Ireland	12	11	29
5	Greece	12	8	14
