= Lists of kickboxers =

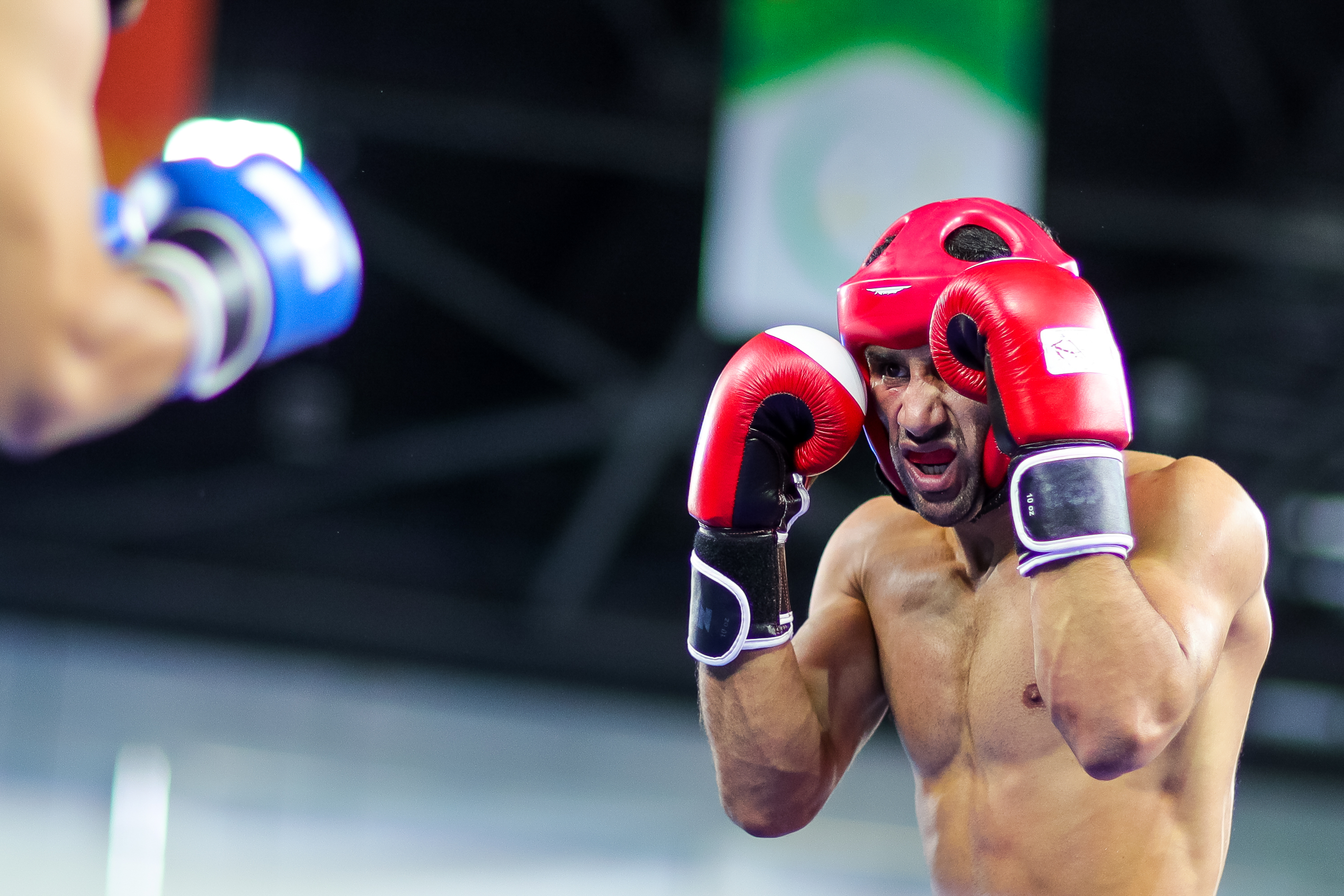
Hamid Amni at Asian Indoor and Martial Arts Games, Ashgabat-Turkmenistan 2017.

The list of kickboxers is divided into:

- List of male kickboxers
- List of female kickboxers
