= W.A.K.O. World Championships 2007 (Belgrade) =

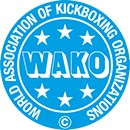
- The poster for W.A.K.O. World Championships 2007 (Belgrade)
- Promotion: W.A.K.O.
- Date: September 24 (Start); October 1, 2007 (End)
- Venue: Pionir Hall
- City: Belgrade, Serbia

Event chronology
W.A.K.O. European Championships 2006 in Skopje	W.A.K.O. World Championships 2007 (Belgrade)	W.A.K.O. World Championships 2007 in Coimbra

W.A.K.O. World Championships 2007 in Belgrade were the joint 16th edition of the W.A.K.O. world championships - the second event would be held later that year in Coimbra, Portugal. They were for amateur male and female kickboxers and covered the following categories; K-1, Low-Kick and Light-Contact. Weight classes for men ranged from light bantamweight (51 kg or 112 lb) to super heavyweight (over 91 kg or 200.6 lb), while the women's ranged from featherweight (52 kg or 114.6 lb) to super heavyweight (over 70 kg or 154 lb). More information on the categories, weight classes and rules is provided in the various sections below. In total there were 1085 athletes at the championships, representing sixty countries including China (taking part for the first time), fighting in 49 tournaments. The Belgrade championships were held at the Pionir Hall in Belgrade, Serbia from Monday, September 24 to Monday, October 1, 2007.

== K-1 ==
W.A.K.O.'s K-1 category uses the same rules set by the K-1 organization and combine a mixture of techniques from Muay Thai, Karate, western boxing and other forms of stand up fighting. The main difference between K-1 rules and other forms of kickboxing is the use of the clinch and knees – which have recently been limited to one knee per clinch. Attacks that are legal include strikes to the head (front, side and forehead), the torso (front and side), leg (any part) and foot/feet (sweeps only). As mentioned before fighters are also allowed to knees (only one hand to clinch and one knee strike per clinch) and can use the back fist/spinning back fist technique. Strikes that are illegal include attacks to the top of the head, the back, the top of the shoulders, the neck and shots to the groin. Techniques involving elbows are also illegal. Due to the amateur nature of W.A.K.O. championships all fighters must wear protection for their head, teeth, breast (women only) groin, shin and feet, and must fight with the standard 10-ounce (280 g) gloves.

Each fight is three, two-minute rounds and is scored by three judges who score successful (legal) strikes that are not blocked, and are thrown with full power. As with other forms, illegal strikes may result in a point(s) deduction or even disqualification. Unlike Full-Contact and Low-Kick it is not necessary for the minimum six kicks per round to be counted. Victory can be achieved by a point's decision, technical knockout or knockout, abandonment (when one fighter gives up), disqualification or by a walkover (other fighter is unable to participate). If a fighter is knocked down three times in the fight he will automatically lose via technical knockout. More detail on K-1 rules can be found at the official W.A.K.O. website.

Weight classes in K-1 at Belgrade were similar to that of the Low-Kick category, with the men having eleven weight classes from bantamweight (54 kg or 118.8 lb) to super heavyweight (over 90 kg or 200.2 lb), while the women's had six beginning at featherweight (52 kg or 114.4 lb) and ending super heavyweight (over 70 kg or 154 lb). Belarus was the most successful nation in K-1 winning five gold, three silver and five bronze in both the male and female categories.

=== K-1 (Men) Medals Table ===
Event	Gold	Silver	Bronze
Bantamweight -54 kg	Fernando Machado (Portugal)	Aliaksei Papou (Belarus)	Amine Alaoui M'Hamdi (Morocco)
Bantamweight -54 kg	Fernando Machado (Portugal)	Aliaksei Papou (Belarus)	Azamat Murzabekov (Russia)
Featherweight -57 kg	Maksym Glubochenko (Ukraine)	Aleksandar Gogic (Serbia)	Yury Satsuk (Belarus)
Featherweight -57 kg	Maksym Glubochenko (Ukraine)	Aleksandar Gogic (Serbia)	Gaetano Verziere (Italy)
Lightweight -60 kg	Eldar Umarakaev (Russia)	Emrah Ogut (Turkey)	Serhiy Adamchuk (Ukraine)
Lightweight -60 kg	Eldar Umarakaev (Russia)	Emrah Ogut (Turkey)	Gillermo Estrada Martinez (Mexico)
Light Welterweight -63.5 kg	Andrei Kulebin (Belarus)	Kurbanali Akaev (Russia)	Jose Luis Uribe Garcia (Mexico)
Light Welterweight -63.5 kg	Andrei Kulebin (Belarus)	Kurbanali Akaev (Russia)	Sreten Miletic (Serbia)
Welterweight -67 kg	Piotr Kobylanski (Poland)	Gor Shavelyan (Russia)	Vitaliy Hubenko (Ukraine)
Welterweight -67 kg	Piotr Kobylanski (Poland)	Gor Shavelyan (Russia)	Yauheni Vinahradau (Belarus)
Light Middleweight -71 kg	Dmitry Valent (Belarus)	Rizvan Isaev (Russia)	Djime Coulibaly (France)
Light Middleweight -71 kg	Dmitry Valent (Belarus)	Rizvan Isaev (Russia)	Manuele Raini (Italy)
Middleweight -75 kg	Yury Harbachou (Belarus)	Kamel Metzani (France)	José Reis (Portugal)
Middleweight -75 kg	Yury Harbachou (Belarus)	Kamel Metzani (France)	Ile Risteski (North Macedonia)
Light Heavyweight -81 kg	Dmitry Kirpan (Ukraine)	Luka Simic (Croatia)	Dzianis Hanchardnak (Belarus)
Light Heavyweight -81 kg	Dmitry Kirpan (Ukraine)	Luka Simic (Croatia)	Alexander Stetsurenko (Russia)
Cruiserweight -86 kg	Dženan Poturak (Bosnia and Herzegovina)	Ivan Stanić (Croatia)	Zaur Alakbarov (Azerbaijan)
Cruiserweight -86 kg	Dženan Poturak (Bosnia and Herzegovina)	Ivan Stanić (Croatia)	Siarhei Krauchanka (Belarus)
Heavyweight -91 kg	Andrei Malchanau (Belarus)	Atanas Stojkovski (North Macedonia)	Zoran Majkic (Croatia)
Heavyweight -91 kg	Andrei Malchanau (Belarus)	Atanas Stojkovski (North Macedonia)	Nenad Miletic (Serbia)
Super Heavyweight +91 kg	Alexei Kudin (Belarus)	Dzhamal Kasumov (Russia)	Mladen Bozic (Serbia)
Super Heavyweight +91 kg	Alexei Kudin (Belarus)	Dzhamal Kasumov (Russia)	Mirko Vlahovic (Montenegro)

=== K-1 (Women) Medals Table ===
Event	Gold	Silver	Bronze
Featherweight -52 kg	Rajaa Hajdaowi (Morocco)	Yulia El Skaya (Russia)	Natasa Ninic (Serbia)
Featherweight -52 kg	Rajaa Hajdaowi (Morocco)	Yulia El Skaya (Russia)	Eva Ott (Hungary)
Lightweight -56 kg	Souad Rochdi (Morocco)	Alena Kuchynskaya (Belarus)	Donatella Panu (Italy)
Lightweight -56 kg	Souad Rochdi (Morocco)	Alena Kuchynskaya (Belarus)	Natalia Grabowska (Poland)
Middleweight -60 kg	Alena Muratava (Belarus)	Kseniya Belskaya (Russia)	Paola Cappucci (Italy)
Middleweight -60 kg	Alena Muratava (Belarus)	Kseniya Belskaya (Russia)	Suzana Radovanovic (Serbia)
Light Heavyweight -65 kg	Elena Solareva (Russia)	Ala Ivashkevich (Belarus)	Jelena Djuric (Serbia)
Light Heavyweight -65 kg	Elena Solareva (Russia)	Ala Ivashkevich (Belarus)	Only 3 contestants
Heavyweight -70 kg	Eva Halasi (Serbia)	Rabih Soukayna (Morocco)	Maryna Kalinina (Belarus)
Heavyweight -70 kg	Eva Halasi (Serbia)	Rabih Soukayna (Morocco)	Ekaterina Rokunova (Russia)
Super Heavyweight +70 kg	Zita Zatyko (Hungary)	Samira El Haddad (Morocco)	Azza Attoura (Syria)
Super Heavyweight +70 kg	Zita Zatyko (Hungary)	Samira El Haddad (Morocco)	Albina Vaskeykina (Russia)

== Low-Kick ==
Low-Kick is similar to Full-Contact kickboxing only that as well as allowing kicks and punches to the head and body, it also allows clean kicks to be made to opponents legs. Attacks that are legal include strikes to the head (front, side and forehead), the torso (front and side), leg (thigh) and foot/feet (sweeps only). Strikes that are illegal include attacks to the top of the head, the back, the top of the shoulders, the neck and the groin. All fighters are required to wear protection for their head, teeth, breast (women only) groin, shin and feet, and must fight with the standard 10-ounce (280 g) gloves.

A minimum of six kicks must be thrown each round or points may be deducted by the referee. Each fight is three, two minute rounds and is scored by three judges. The judges will score successful (legal) strikes that are not blocked, and are thrown with full power. Illegal moves may result in points deduction or if repeated, disqualification. In the event of a draw after three rounds the judges will base the victor on who was stronger in the final round, or failing that will use their remarks from each round to deduce who wins. Victory can be achieved by a point's decision, technical knockout or knockout, abandonment (when one fighter gives up), disqualification or by a walkover (other fighter is unable to participate). If a fighter is knocked down three times in the fight he will automatically lose via technical knockout. More detail on Low-Kick rules can be found at the official W.A.K.O. website.

At Belgrade the men's Low-Kick competition had twelve six weight classes starting at light bantamweight (51 kg or 112.2 lb) to super heavyweight (over 91 kg or 200.2 lb), while the women's had six ranging from featherweight (52 kg or 114.4 lb) to super heavyweight (over 70 kg or 154 lb), while . As with Light-Contact, by the championships end, Russia was the strongest nation, having won an impressive haul of six gold, two silver and two bronze medals.

=== Low-Kick (Men) Medals Table ===
Event	Gold	Silver	Bronze
Light Bantamweight -51 kg	Zaur Mammadov (Azerbaijan)	Ivan Sciolla (Italy)	Aleksandar Aleksandrov (Bulgaria)
Light Bantamweight -51 kg	Zaur Mammadov (Azerbaijan)	Ivan Sciolla (Italy)	Utkin Hudoyanov (Kyrgyzstan)
Bantamweight -54 kg	Emil Karimov (Azerbaijan)	Jordan Vassilev (Bulgaria)	Youness Ouali Alami (Morocco)
Bantamweight -54 kg	Emil Karimov (Azerbaijan)	Jordan Vassilev (Bulgaria)	Fabrice Bauluck (Mauritius)
Featherweight -57 kg	Dzmitry Varatis (Belarus)	Boban Marinkovic (Serbia)	Umar Paskhaev (Russia)
Featherweight -57 kg	Dzmitry Varatis (Belarus)	Boban Marinkovic (Serbia)	Elnur Salamov (Azerbaijan)
Lightweight -60 kg	Zurab Faroyan (Russia)	Eduard Mammadov (Azerbaijan)	Fikri Arican (Turkey)
Lightweight -60 kg	Zurab Faroyan (Russia)	Eduard Mammadov (Azerbaijan)	Dzianis Tselitsa (Belarus)
Light Welterweight -63.5 kg	Artur Magadov (Russia)	Soufiane Zridy (Morocco)	Mirlan Ibraimov (Kyrgyzstan)
Light Welterweight -63.5 kg	Artur Magadov (Russia)	Soufiane Zridy (Morocco)	Mihajio Jovanovic (Serbia)
Welterweight -67 kg	Nikolay Shtakhanov (Russia)	Yahya Alemdag (Turkey)	Nebojsa Denic (Serbia)
Welterweight -67 kg	Nikolay Shtakhanov (Russia)	Yahya Alemdag (Turkey)	Ramil Nadirov (Azerbaijan)
Light Middleweight -71 kg	Konstantin Sbytov (Russia)	Michał Głogowski (Poland)	Milan Dragojlovic (Serbia)
Light Middleweight -71 kg	Konstantin Sbytov (Russia)	Michał Głogowski (Poland)	Paolo Iry (France)
Middleweight -75 kg	Marko Benzon (Croatia)	Bakari Tounkara (France)	Dragan Micic (Serbia)
Middleweight -75 kg	Marko Benzon (Croatia)	Bakari Tounkara (France)	Nurlan Nurgaliyev (Kazakhstan)
Light Heavyweight -81 kg	Nenad Pagonis (Serbia)	Rail Rajabov (Azerbaijan)	Viktor Nordh (Sweden)
Light Heavyweight -81 kg	Nenad Pagonis (Serbia)	Rail Rajabov (Azerbaijan)	Denes Racz (Hungary)
Cruiserweight -86 kg	Gamzat Isalmagomedov (Russia)	Stipe Stipetic (Croatia)	Bojan Glavas (Bosnia and Herzegovina)
Cruiserweight -86 kg	Gamzat Isalmagomedov (Russia)	Stipe Stipetic (Croatia)	Georgiy Yemeliyanov (Kazakhstan)
Heavyweight -91 kg	Yauhen Anhalevich (Belarus)	Igor Jurković (Croatia)	Dmitriy Antonenko (Russia)
Heavyweight -91 kg	Yauhen Anhalevich (Belarus)	Igor Jurković (Croatia)	Abdeslam Narjiss (Morocco)
Super Heavyweight +91 kg	Dragan Jovanović (Serbia)	Mikhail Shvoev (Russia)	Ruslan Aushev (Kazakhstan)
Super Heavyweight +91 kg	Dragan Jovanović (Serbia)	Mikhail Shvoev (Russia)	Hafiz Bahshaliyev (Azerbaijan)

=== Low-Kick (Women) Medals Table ===
Event	Gold	Silver	Bronze
Featherweight -52 kg	Seda Duygu Aygün (Turkey)	Nadiya Khayenok (Ukraine)	Aliya Boranbayeva (Kazakhstan)
Featherweight -52 kg	Seda Duygu Aygün (Turkey)	Nadiya Khayenok (Ukraine)	Maria Krivoshapkina (Russia)
Lightweight -56 kg	Lidia Andreeva (Russia)	Milena Dincic (Serbia)	Elisa Albinsson (Sweden)
Lightweight -56 kg	Lidia Andreeva (Russia)	Milena Dincic (Serbia)	Alicja Piecyk (Poland)
Middleweight -60 kg	Valerija Kurluk (Kazakhstan)	Fatima Bokova (Russia)	Ana Mandic (Croatia)
Middleweight -60 kg	Valerija Kurluk (Kazakhstan)	Fatima Bokova (Russia)	Barbara Plazzoli (Italy)
Light Heavyweight -65 kg	Kamila Balanda (Poland)	Mimma Mandolini (Italy)	Vera Avdeeva (Russia)
Light Heavyweight -65 kg	Kamila Balanda (Poland)	Mimma Mandolini (Italy)	Ina Ozerava (Belarus)
Heavyweight -70 kg	Amzail Bouchra (Morocco)	Nives Radic (Croatia)	Natasa Ivetic (Serbia)
Heavyweight -70 kg	Amzail Bouchra (Morocco)	Nives Radic (Croatia)	Elena Kondratyeva (Russia)
Super Heavyweight +70 kg	Paulina Biec (Poland)	Olivera Milanovic (Serbia)	Aigul Kozhagaliyeva (Kazakhstan)
Super Heavyweight +70 kg	Paulina Biec (Poland)	Olivera Milanovic (Serbia)	Benita Muller (South Africa)

== Light-Contact ==
In this form of kickboxing fighters are scored on their ability to land controlled and clean strikes with an emphasis put on style over power. Fighters that fight too aggressively may be cautioned by the referee and, if the offence is repeated, may be disqualified, although strikes that are too light (such as a push or brush) will not be scored either. Attacks are allowed to the head (front, side and forehead), the torso (front and side) and leg (foot sweeps). As mentioned before excessive force is illegal as well as strikes to the top of the head, the back, the top of the shoulders, the neck and below the belt. Light-Contact is seen as the intermediate stage between Semi and Full-Contact kickboxing involving more physicality than Semi but less so than Full. All fighters are required to wear protection for their head, teeth, breast (women only) groin, shin and feet, and must fight with the standard 10oz gloves.

Fighters score the following points for landing a controlled strike on their opponent; punch, kick to body, foot sweep (1 point), kick to head, jumping kick to body (2 points), jumping kick to head (3 points). Each fight is three, two-minute rounds and is scored by three judges. In the event of a draw the match will be scored electronically. Victory can be achieved by points decision, technical knockout (usually when one fighter is so dominant the referee is forced to stop the contest), abandonment (when one fighter gives up), disqualification or by a walkover (other fighter is unable to participate). More detail on Light-Contact rules can be found at the official W.A.K.O. website.

Light-Contact uses slightly different weight classes from Low-Kick and K-1. At Belgrade the men had nine weight classes, starting at 57 kg or 125.4 lb and ending at over 94 kg (206.8 lb), while the women's Light-Contact competition had five weight classes beginning at 55 kg (121 lb) and ending at over 70 kg (154 lb). At the end of the championships, Russia was the most successful nation in Light-Contact having won five gold and two silver medals.

=== Light-Contact (Men) Medals Table ===
Event	Gold	Silver	Bronze
-57 kg	Dezső Debreczeni (Hungary)	Maxim Aysin (Russia)	Thomas Karlsson (Sweden)
-57 kg	Dezső Debreczeni (Hungary)	Maxim Aysin (Russia)	Selcuk Laleci (Turkey)
-63 kg	Marko Sarko (Croatia)	Sandor Szanto (Hungary)	Murat Aydin (Turkey)
-63 kg	Marko Sarko (Croatia)	Sandor Szanto (Hungary)	Kostyantyn Demorets'kyy (Ukraine)
-69 kg	Przemyslaw Ziemnicki (Poland)	Fighter Disqualified	Dejan Cepic (Croatia)
-69 kg	Przemyslaw Ziemnicki (Poland)	Fighter Disqualified	Fighter Disqualified
-74 kg	Sergey Zhukov (Russia)	Jerzy Wronski (Poland)	Martin Muravsky (Slovakia)
-74 kg	Sergey Zhukov (Russia)	Jerzy Wronski (Poland)	Kieran Ryan (Republic of Ireland)
-79 kg	Zoltan Dancso (Hungary)	Stefan Bücker (Germany)	Robert Matyja (Poland)
-79 kg	Zoltan Dancso (Hungary)	Stefan Bücker (Germany)	Martin Navratil (Slovakia)
-84 kg	Murat Pukhaev (Russia)	Christian Albrecht (Germany)	Mariusz Niziolek (Poland)
-84 kg	Murat Pukhaev (Russia)	Christian Albrecht (Germany)	Jeno Novak (Hungary)
-89 kg	Ildar Gabbasov (Russia)	Gavin Williamson (United Kingdom)	Yohann Lemair (France)
-89 kg	Ildar Gabbasov (Russia)	Gavin Williamson (United Kingdom)	Juso Prosic (Austria)
-94 kg	Giovanni Nurchi (Germany)	Emin Panyan (Russia)	Ranis Smajlovic (Slovenia)
-94 kg	Giovanni Nurchi (Germany)	Emin Panyan (Russia)	Artem Vasylenko (Ukraine)
+94 kg	Michal Wszelak (Poland)	Igor Kravchuk (Ukraine)	Pascal Blunschi (Switzerland)
+94 kg	Michal Wszelak (Poland)	Igor Kravchuk (Ukraine)	Csaba Podor (Hungary)

=== Light-Contact (Women) Medals Table ===
Event	Gold	Silver	Bronze
-55 kg	Maria Kushtanova (Russia)	Monika Molnar (Hungary)	Kateryna Solovey (Switzerland)
-55 kg	Maria Kushtanova (Russia)	Monika Molnar (Hungary)	Maria Krivoshapkina (Ukraine)
-60 kg	Klara Marton (Hungary)	Julie McHale (Republic of Ireland)	Monika Florek (Poland)
-60 kg	Klara Marton (Hungary)	Julie McHale (Republic of Ireland)	Andrea Ivas (Croatia)
-65 kg	Sabina Sehic (Slovenia)	Nicole Trimmel (Austria)	Julia Göldner (Germany)
-65 kg	Sabina Sehic (Slovenia)	Nicole Trimmel (Austria)	Irena Kobosilova (Czech Republic)
-70 kg	Agnieszka Poltorak (Poland)	Karin Edenius (Sweden)	Dianna Cameron (United Kingdom)
-70 kg	Agnieszka Poltorak (Poland)	Karin Edenius (Sweden)	Nikolina Juricev (Croatia)
+70 kg	Oxana Kinakh (Russia)	Barbara Kovacs (Hungary)	Diana Cambell (Republic of Ireland)
+70 kg	Oxana Kinakh (Russia)	Barbara Kovacs (Hungary)	Natali John (Germany)

== Overall Medals Standing (Top 5) ==
The nation that came out on top at the W.A.K.O. Amateur World Championships 2007 in Belgrade were Russia who amassed fourteen gold, ten silvers and ten bronze medals in all categories, both male and female.

Ranking	Country	Gold (gold)	Silver (silver)	Bronze (bronze)
1	Russia	14	10	10
2	Belarus	8	4	8
3	Serbia	3	4	11
4	Poland	6	2	5
5	Hungary	4	4	4

== See also ==
- List of WAKO Amateur World Championships
- List of WAKO Amateur European Championships
