= WAKO Amateur World Championships =

W.A.K.O. (the World Association of Kickboxing Organizations) held its first amateur world championships in 1978 in West Berlin, after having previously staged two European championships the two years previously. It followed this with a second world championships a year later in Tampa, Florida. During the 1980s the world championships were held every other year except for in 1985 when a feud within the W.A.K.O. organization led to two versions of the championships being held on the same date – one in London, the other in Budapest.

In the 1990s W.A.K.O. held its world championships intermittently with at least one every other year although, in 1993 the organization again had a temporary political dispute which like 1985 meant two championships in one year. Additionally, the outbreak of the Balkan War resulted in the 1995 world championships being moved to Kyiv and in 1997 to Gdańsk. By the turn-of-the-twentieth-century, the organization began introducing two different world championships every two years - one typically covering forms of kickboxing such as full-contact, semi-contact and musical forms, while the other types such as Thai-boxing, low-kick kickboxing and later K-1 rules. Of late, W.A.K.O. have begun to get involved with the SportAccord World Combat Games, hosting male and female full-contact, semi-contact and low-contact kickboxing competitions at the 2010 event, with the 2009 world championships (both events) being used as qualifiers.

== List of World Championships ==
=== WAKO World Championships (Seniors and Masters) ===
W.A.K.O. Amateur Kickboxing World Championships

Edition	Year	Host City	Country	Events
1	1978	West Berlin	Germany	7
2	1979	Tampa	United States	14
3	1981	Milan	Italy	7
4	1983	London	United Kingdom	16
5	1985	London	United Kingdom	22
5	1985	Budapest	Hungary	20
6	1987	Munich	Germany	24
7	1990	Mestre	Italy	32
8	1991	London	United Kingdom	28
9	1993	Atlantic City	United States	34
9	1993	Budapest	Hungary	30
10	1995	Kyiv	Ukraine	
11	1997	Gdańsk	Poland	
12	1999	Bishkek	Kyrgyzstan	
12	1999	Caorle	Italy	66
13	2001	Maribor	Slovenia	39
13	2001	Belgrade	Serbia and Montenegro	42
14	2003	Paris	France	+37
14	2003	Yalta	Ukraine	
15	2005	Agadir	Morocco	
15	2005	Szeged	Hungary	
16	2007	Belgrade	Serbia	
16	2007	Coimbra	Portugal	
17	2009	Villach	Austria	
17	2009	Lignano	Italy	
18	2011	Skopje	North Macedonia	
18	2011	Dublin	Ireland	
19	2013	Guarujá	Brazil	
19	2013	Antalya	Turkey	
20	2015	Belgrade	Serbia	
20	2015	Dublin	Ireland	
21	2017	Budapest	Hungary	136
22	2019	Sarajevo	Bosnia and Herzegovina	
22	2023	Great Yarmouth	United Kingdom	
23	2025	Abu Dhabi	United Arab Emirates	

- https://web.archive.org/web/20160809232051/http://www.wakoweb.com/en/page/official-wako-results/feeb0c9a-67d8-4081-9bda-45384f8ee985

=== WAKO World Championships (Cadets and Juniors) ===
Edition	Year	Host City	Country	Events
1	1996			
2	1998			
3	2000			
4	2002	Budva	Serbia and Montenegro	
5	2004			
6	2006	Zadar	Croatia	
7	2008	Naples	Italy	
8	2010	Belgrade	Serbia	
9	2012	Bratislava	Slovakia	
10	2014	Rimini	Italy	
11	2016	Dublin	Ireland	230
12	2018	Jesolo	Italy	238

- https://web.archive.org/web/20160809232051/http://www.wakoweb.com/en/page/official-wako-results/feeb0c9a-67d8-4081-9bda-45384f8ee985
- http://www.wakoweb.com/en/article/2006-a-year-to-remember/028576ff-9873-4616-aa62-c62dc0119c2c
- http://www.wakoweb.com/en/news/world-cadetjunior-championships-naples-italy/be366fd5-5038-4974-b7be-3917f46db431
- http://www.wakoweb.com/en/event/wako-world-cadets-and-juniors-championships/e13a080a-0caa-44e8-b9ca-b33b6b4100e3
- http://www.wakoweb.com/en/event/cadets-and-juniors-world-championships/d9885de8-f925-4186-931c-5f80eec9f1a0
- 2016 Results : https://www.sportdata.org/kickboxing/set-online/veranstaltung_info_main.php?active_menu=calendar&vernr=227

=== WAKO World University Championships (Students) ===
Edition	Year	Host City	Country	Events
1	2014	Ufa	Russia	

- http://www.wakoweb.com/en/event/1st-wako-international-university-kickboxing-championship/01574997-1b7b-471c-8e0e-62e11d2765dc

== See also ==
- List of WAKO Amateur European Championships
- List of kickboxers
