= WAKO Amateur European Championships =

List of World Amateur Kickboxing Organisation championships

The first W.A.K.O. Amateur European Championships were organized by George Bruckner and held in Vienna in 1977 and between 1977 and 1982 the organization held a European Championships each year. W.A.K.O. began to change the timing of the championships after 1982, making sure that they were every two years, thus (generally) falling between world championships. In 1994 W.A.K.O. first started introduce two European championships to be held in the same year.

== List of European Championships ==
=== WAKO European Championships (Seniors and Masters) ===
W.A.K.O. Amateur Kickboxing European Championships
Edition	Year	Host city	Country	Events
1	1977	Vienna	Austria	7
2	1978	Wolfsburg	Germany	14
3	1979	Milan	Italy	14
4	1980	London	United Kingdom	14
5	1981	Dublin	Ireland	14
6	1982	Basel	Switzerland	7
7	1984	Graz	Austria	17
8	1986	Athens	Greece	21
9	1988	Mestre	Italy	17
10	1990	Madrid	Spain	34
11	1992	Varna	Bulgaria	
12	1994	Helsinki	Finland	
12	1994	Lisbon	Portugal	
13	1996	Belgrade	FR Yugoslavia	
14	1998	Kyiv	Ukraine	
14	1998	Leverkusen	Germany	31
15	2000	Moscow	Russia	
15	2000	Jesolo	Italy	42
16	2002	Jesolo	Italy	80
17	2004	Budva	Serbia and Montenegro	
17	2004	Maribor	Slovenia	
18	2006	Lisbon	Portugal	
18	2006	Skopje	North Macedonia	
19	2008	Varna	Bulgaria	
19	2008	Porto	Portugal	
20	2010	Baku	Azerbaijan	
20	2010	Loutraki	Greece	
21	2012	Ankara	Turkey	
21	2012	Bucharest	Romania	
22	2014	Bilbao	Spain	
22	2014	Maribor	Slovenia	
23	2016	Maribor	Slovenia	
23	2016	Loutraki	Greece	
24	2017	Skopje	North Macedonia	
25	2018	Maribor	Slovenia	
25	2018	Bratislava	Slovakia	
26	2019	Győr	Hungary	
–	2020	Cancelled due to COVID-19 pandemic		
27	2021	Budva	Montenegro	
28	2022	Antalya	Turkey	
29	2024	Athens	Greece	
30	2026	Skopje	North Macedonia	

- https://web.archive.org/web/20160809232051/http://www.wakoweb.com/en/page/official-wako-results/feeb0c9a-67d8-4081-9bda-45384f8ee985

=== WAKO European Championships (Cadets and Juniors) ===
Edition	Year	Host city	Country	Events
1	2007	Faro	Portugal	
2	2009	Pula	Croatia	
3	2011	Lignano	Italy	
4	2013	Krynica-Zdrój	Poland	
5	2015	San Sebastián	Spain	
6	2017	Skopje	North Macedonia	222
7	2019	Győr	Hungary	
8	2021	Budva	Montenegro	
9	2023	Istanbul	Turkey	
10	2025	Jesolo Lido	Italy	

- 2017 Results : https://www.sportdata.org/kickboxing/set-online/veranstaltung_info_main.php?active_menu=calendar&vernr=394

https://www.sportdata.org/kickboxing/set-online/veranstaltung_info_main.php?active_menu=calendar&vernr=2368#a_eventhead

https://www.sportdata.org/kickboxing/set-online/veranstaltung_info_main.php?active_menu=calendar&vernr=2487#a_eventhead

== See also ==
- List of WAKO Amateur World Championships
- List of kickboxers
