= Vitaly Gurkov =

Belarusian kickboxer

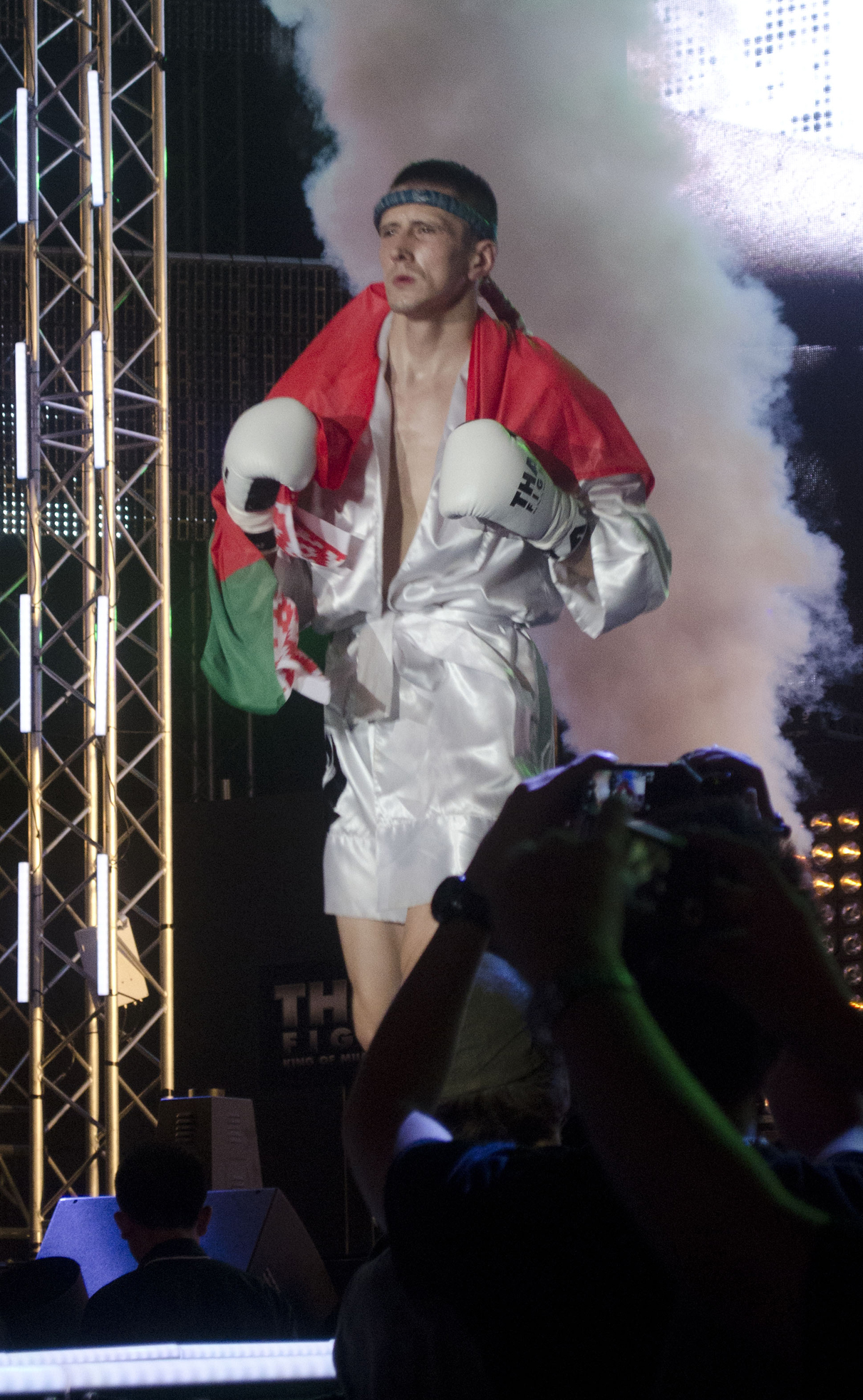
- Gurkov at Thai Fight 2012 Final
- Born: Вiталiй Рыгоравiч Гуркоў; 27 March 1985 (age 41)
- Native name: Вiталiй Гуркоў
- Nationality: (Belarus) Belarusian
- Height: 1.86 m (6 ft 1 in)
- Weight: 70 kg (154 lb; 11 st 0 lb)
- Division: Welterweight
- Style: Muay Thai
- Stance: Orthodox
- Fighting out of: Minsk, Belarus
- Team: Patriot Gym
- Years active: 2000–present

Kickboxing record
- Total: 115
- Wins: 100
- Losses: 15
- Last updated on: 8 March 2014

Vitaly Hurkou (Belarusian: Вiталь Рыгоравiч Гуркоў; born 27 March 1985) is a Belarusian welterweight Muay Thai kickboxer fighting out of Minsk for Patriot Gym. He is a seven time amateur Muay Thai world champion and is the K-1 World MAX 2010 East Europe champion currently competing in Kunlun Fight. He is also the singer of the rock band Brutto.

== Amateur career ==
Vitaly has been a prominent member of the Belarusian Muay Thai national team. He won his first international tournament in his teens, winning gold at the 2001 I.F.M.A. European Championships. He followed this up two years later aged just 17 by winning a gold medal in the 61 kg category at the 2003 I.A.M.T.F. World Championships in Bangkok, Thailand. Between 2004 and 2008 Vitaly would win four gold medals at the W.M.F. world championships (2004, 2005, 2006, 2007) along with a gold medal at the 2004 W.K.P.F. World Championships and gold at the 2006 W.A.K.O. European Championships.

In 2008 Vitaly entered the 4th Busan TAFISA World Games in Busan, South Korea which was holding the 2008 I.F.M.A. World Championship. He made the final but had to make do with silver – losing his final match to the Ukrainian Petr Nakonechnyi. He returned with a vengeance the following year winning the 2009 I.F.M.A. European Championship and the 2009 I.F.M.A. World Championship. At the world championship Vitaly defeated Marcus Öberg in the quarter-finals before gaining his revenge on Nakonechnyi in the semi-finals en route to winning gold. At the I.F.M.A. world championships in 2010, Vitaly made it through to the final but lost in the gold medal match, although he would win gold earlier on in the year at the I.F.M.A. European Championships in Italy. So far in his amateur career he has nine medals at World championships (seven gold, two silver) and three golds at European championships from 61 kg through to his current weight of 71 kg.

On 30 July 2017, Gurkov became the first 75 kg Muay Thai Gold-medalistat The World Games 2017 in Wroclaw, Poland.

== Professional career ==
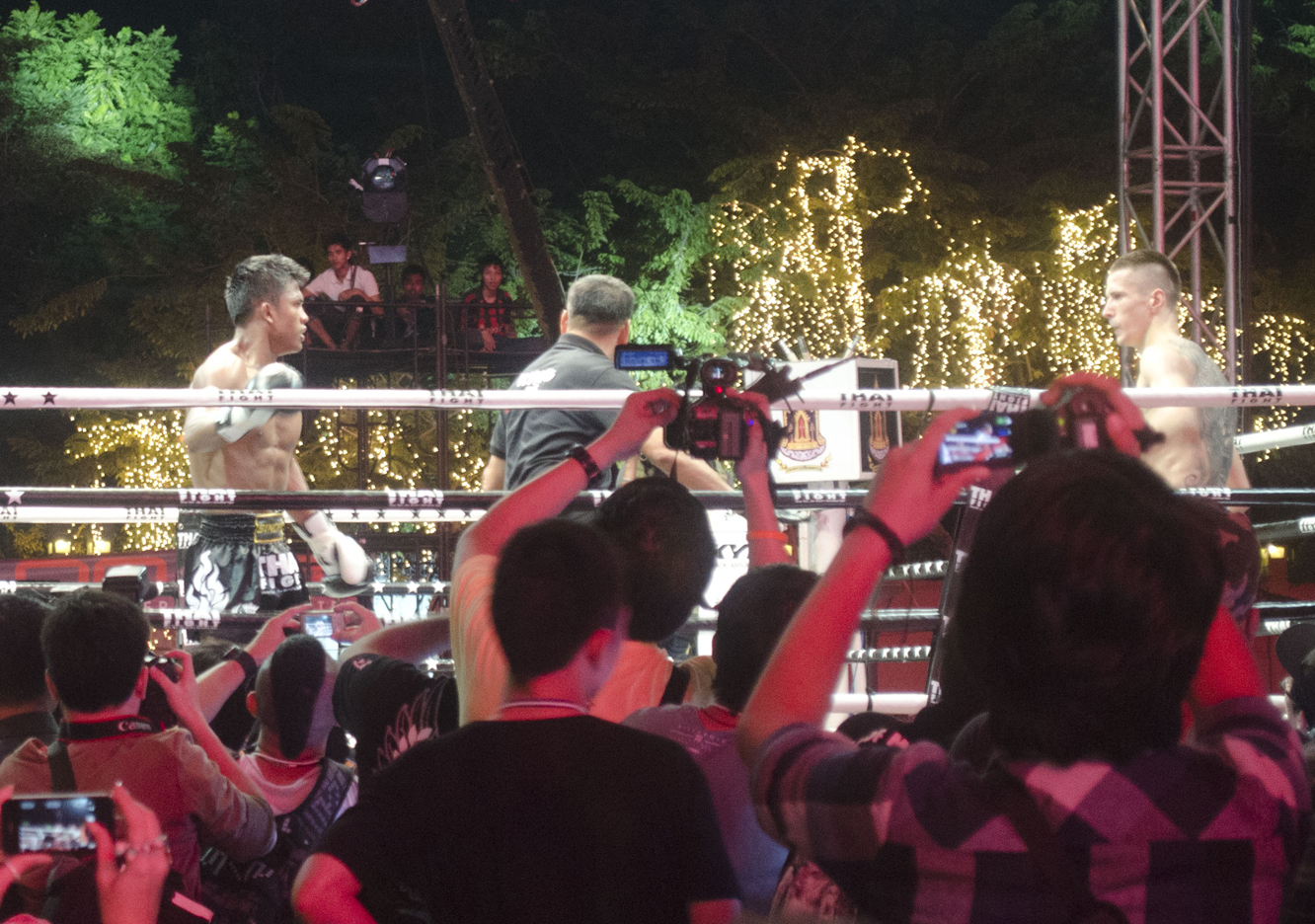
Against Buakaw Por.Pramuk at Thai Fight 2012 Final

As a result of his successful amateur career, Gurkov has increasingly become involved in professional competitions. In 2007, he entered the W.M.C. Brute Force 8 Judgment Day - 72 kg tournament in Melbourne, Australia. Gurkov showed his amateur skills were not lost on the professional circuit, defeating Australian Greg Foley in the final to win the event. In 2008, he attempted to qualify for The Contender Asia Season 2 Muay Thai reality show in Chelyabinsk, Russia. He defeated amateur rival Petr Nakonechnyi in the semi-finals but lost to reigning 75 kg I.M.F.A. World Champion Artem Levin by TKO in the final. In 2009, he had more disappointment, losing in the final of the Tatneft Cup - 70 kg category.

In 2010, Gurkov made his mark on the professional circuit at the K-1 World MAX 2010 East Europe Tournament on 19 March in Minsk, Belarus. He defeated his first two opponents by decision before facing Zamin Guseynov from Azerbaijan in the final. After three rounds, Gurkov was crowned K-1 World MAX 2010 East Europe champion, defeating his opponent by unanimous decision. This victory meant that Gurkov qualified for kickboxing's most prestigious competition at the forthcoming K-1 World MAX 2010 Final 16. At the event, Gurkov was given the toughest draw, having to face reigning K-1 champion Giorgio Petrosyan in Seoul. After three rounds, Vitaly failed to cause an upset, his K-1 MAX dream finished by a unanimous decision defeat. A few weeks later, he was knocked out of another high-profile tournament, losing to Petchmankong Petchfocus in the second round of the Izuzu Thai Fight Muay Thai competition.

He beat Fares Bechar via decision in the quarter-finals of the 2012 Thai Fight 70 kg Tournament at Thai Fight 2012: King of Muay Thai in Bangkok, Thailand on 23 October 2012.

He then beat Antero Hynynen in the tournament semi-finals in Nakhon Ratchasima, Thailand on 25 November 2012.

He lost to Buakaw Banchamek in the final on 16 December 2012.

He defeated Kem Sitsongpeenong by decision to win the WBC Muaythai World Super Welterweight (-69.8 kg/154 lb) Championship at Ring Wars in Milan, Italy on 25 January 2014.

He was expected fight Tony Hervey at Kickboxing Empire II in Las Vegas, Nevada, United States on 8 March 2014, but Hervey was replaced with Jaseem Al Djilwi. Gurkov won by TKO in round three after barraging Al Djiwali with a knee to the body and subsequent unanswered follow-up punches in round three.

In 2017 Gurkov joined Banchamek Gym and had his first fight representing the camp at Kunlun Fight 62. He defeated Nurla Mulali of China by decision on 10 June 2017, in Bangkok, Thailand.

On 5 November 2017, Gurkov won eight-man 75 kg tournament at Kunlun Fight 66 in Wuhan, China, defeating Chinese Nurla Mulali, Thai Arthit Hanchana, and Iranian Hossein Karami.

On 27 July 2019, Gurkov won the 75 kg tournament in Beijing, China to become the first athlete in the promotion to win the belt twice.

== Titles and accomplishments ==
=== Professional ===
- Kunlun Fight
  - 2019 Kunlun Fight 75kg Tournament Champion
  - 2017 Kunlun Fight 75kg Tournament Champion
- World Boxing Council Muaythai
  - 2014 WBC World Super Welterweight (-69.8 kg/154 lb) Championship
- K-1
  - 2010 K-1 World MAX East Europe Champion
- Tatneft Cup
  - 2009 Tatneft Cup Runner-up
- The Contender Asia
  - 2008 Season 2 Russia Super 8 Qualifier runner-up
- World Muay Thai Council
  - 2007 W.M.C. Brute Force 8 Judgement Day Champion

=== Amateur ===
- World Games
  - 2017 World Games in Wroclaw, Poland (gold) -75 kg
  - 2013 World Games in Bangkok, Thailand (silver) -71 kg
- International Federation of Muaythai Associations
  - 2014 I.F.M.A. European Championships in Kraków, Poland (gold) -75 kg
  - 2013 I.F.M.A. European Championships in Lisbon, Portugal (gold) -71 kg
  - 2012 I.F.M.A. World Championships in Saint Petersburg, Russia (silver) -71 kg
  - 2012 I.F.M.A. European Championships in Antalya, Turkey (silver) -71 kg
  - 2011 I.F.M.A. World Championships in Tashkent, Uzbekistan (gold) -71 kg
  - 2010 I.F.M.A. World Championships in Bangkok, Thailand (silver) -71 kg
  - 2010 I.F.M.A. European Championships in Velletri, Italy (gold) -71 kg
  - 2009 I.F.M.A. World Championships in Bangkok, Thailand (gold) -71 kg
  - 2009 I.F.M.A. European Championships in Liepāja, Latvia (gold) -71 kg
  - 2008 I.F.M.A. World Championships in Bangkok, Thailand (silver) -71 kg
  - 2001 I.F.M.A. European Championships (gold)
- World Muaythai Federation
  - 2007 W.M.F. World Championships in Bangkok, Thailand (gold) -71 kg
  - 2006 W.M.F. World Championships in Bangkok, Thailand (gold) -67 kg
  - 2005 W.M.F. World Championships in Bangkok, Thailand (gold)
  - 2004 W.M.F. World Championships in Bangkok, Thailand (gold)
- World Association of Kickboxing Organizations
  - 2006 W.A.K.O. European Championships in Skopje, Macedonia (gold) -67 kg (Thai-Boxing)
- 2004 W.K.P.F. World Championships (gold)
- 2003 I.A.M.T.F. World Championships in Bangkok, Thailand (gold) -61 kg

== Fight record ==
Kickboxing record
Date	Result	Opponent	Event	Location	Method	Round	Time
2019-07-27	Win	(Thailand) Saiyok Pumpanmuang	Kunlun Fight 81 75 kg World Tournament (Finals)	Beijing, China	Decision (unanimous)	3	3:00
Wins the Kunlun Fight 75kg Tournament .
2019-07-27	Win	(China) Wu Sihan	Kunlun Fight 81 75 kg World Tournament (1/2 Finals)	Beijing, China	KO (body punch)	2	3:00
2019-07-27	Win	(China) Yiliyasi	Kunlun Fight 81 75 kg World Tournament (1/4 Finals)	Beijing, China	Decision (unanimous)	3	3:00
2018-10-22	Loss	(Kazakhstan) Mergen Bilyalov	kunlun Fight 78 75 kg Tournament, Semi-finals	China	TKO (right hook to the body)	1	1:08
2018-10-22	Win	(China) Tan Xiaofeng	Kunlun Fight 78 75 kg Tournament, Quarter-finals	China	TKO		
2018-08-05	Loss	(Brazil) Jonatan Oliveira	ACB KB-17	Russia	TKO (referee stoppage/right cross)	2	0:33
2018-02-03	Loss	(China) Zhang Yang	kunlun Fight 69	China	Extra round decision	4	3:00
2017-11-05	Win	(Iran) Hossein Karami	Kunlun Fight 66 75 kg Championship Final	China	Decision	3	3:00
Wins the Kunlun Fight 75kg Tournament .
2017-11-05	Win	(Thailand) Arthit Hanchana	Kunlun Fight 66 75 kg Championship Final 4	China	TKO		
2017-11-05	Win	(China) Nurla Mulali	Kunlun Fight 66 75 kg Championship Final 8	China	Decision (unanimous)	3	3:00
2017-06-10	Win	(China) Nurla Mulali	Kunlun Fight 62	Bangkok, Thailand	Decision (unanimous)	3	3:00
2016-12-11	Win	(Kazakhstan) Mergen Bilyalov	PFC Silk Road Hero 2016	Chongqing, China	Decision (unanimous)	3	3:00
2014-03-08	Win	(Netherlands) Jaseem Al Djilwi	Kickboxing Empire II	Las Vegas, Nevada, USA	TKO (right knee to the body and punches)	3	2:06
2014-01-25	Win	(Thailand) Kem Sitsongpeenong	Ring Wars	Milan, Italy	Decision	5	3:00
Wins the WBC Muaythai World Super Welterweight (-69.8 kg/154 lb) Championship.
2012-12-16	Loss	(Thailand) Buakaw Banchamek	THAI FIGHT 2012: Finals, 70 kg Tournament Final	Thailand	Decision	3	3:00
2012-11-25	Win	(Finland) Antero Hynynen	THAI FIGHT 2012: 2nd round, 70 kg Tournament Semi-finals	Nakhon Ratchasima, Thailand			
2012-10-23	Win	(France) Fares Bechar	THAI FIGHT 2012: 1st round, 70 kg Tournament Quarter-finals	Bangkok, Thailand	Decision	3	3:00
2012-06-28	Loss	(Russia) Shamil Abdulmedzhidov	Dictator FC	Moscow, Russia	Decision (unanimous)	3	3:00
2010-10-25	Loss	(Thailand) Petchmankong Petchfocus	THAI FIGHT Final 8	Bangkok, Thailand	Decision	3	3:00
Fails to qualify for THAI FIGHT Final 4.
2010-10-03	Loss	(Italy) Giorgio Petrosyan	K-1 World MAX 2010 Final 16 - Part 2	Seoul, South Korea	Decision (unanimous)	3	3:00
Fails to qualify for K-1 World MAX 2010 Final.
2010-08-29	Win	(South Korea) Jong Hyun Ko	THAI FIGHT Final 16	Bangkok, Thailand	TKO (referee stoppage)	3	
Qualifies for THAI FIGHT Final 8.
2010-03-19	Win	(Azerbaijan) Zamin Guseynov	K-1 World MAX 2010 East Europe Tournament, Final	Minsk, Belarus	Decision (unanimous)	3	3:00
Wins K-1 World MAX 2010 East Europe Tournament and qualifies for K-1 World MAX 2010 Final 16.
2010-03-19	Win	(Ukraine) Enriko Gogokhia	K-1 World MAX 2010 East Europe Tournament, Semi-finals	Minsk, Belarus	Ext.R decision (unanimous)	4	3:00
2010-03-19	Win	(Poland) Lukasz Szul	K-1 World MAX 2010 East Europe Tournament, Quarter-finals	Minsk, Belarus	Decision (unanimous)	3	3:00
2009-10-23	Loss	(Kyrgyzstan) Uranbek Esenkulov	Tatneft Cup 2009, Final	Kazan, Russia	Decision	6	3:00
Fight was for the Tatneft Cup 2009.
2009-09-16	Win	(Armenia) Armen Israelyan	Tatneft Cup 2009, Semi-finals	Kazan, Russia	Decision	4	3:00
2009-05-26	Win	(Russia) Vladimir Shakaya	Tatneft Cup 2009 2nd Selection, Quarter-finals	Kazan, Russia	TKO (knee to body)	2	
2009-02-19	Win	(Russia) Andrey Khovrin	Tatneft Cup 2009 4th Selection, 1st round	Kazan, Russia	Decision	4	3:00
2008-12-19	Loss	(Russia) Artem Levin	"The Contender Asia" Season 2 Russia Super 8 Qualifier, Final	Chelyabinsk, Russia	TKO (cut)	1	3:00
Fails to qualify for "The Contender Asia" Season 2.
2008-12-19	Win	(Ukraine) Petr Nakonechnyi	"The Contender Asia" Season 2 Russia Super 8 Qualifier, Semi-finals	Chelyabinsk, Russia	Decision (unanimous)	3	3:00
2008-12-19	Win	(France) Mickael Piscitello	"The Contender Asia" Season 2 Russia Super 8 Qualifier, Quarter-finals	Chelyabinsk, Russia	Decision	3	3:00
2007-03-25	Win	(Australia) Greg Foley	W.M.C. Brute Force 8 Judgement Day, Final	Melbourne, Australia	Decision (unanimous)	3	3:00
Wins W.M.C. Brute Force 8 Judgement Day tournament -72 kg.
2007-03-25	Win	(Australia) Jason Scerri	W.M.C. Brute Force 8 Judgement Day, Semi-finals	Melbourne, Australia	Decision (unanimous)	3	3:00
2007-03-25	Win	(Poland) Marcin Olczak	W.M.C. Brute Force 8 Judgement Day, Quarter-finals	Melbourne, Australia	Decision (unanimous)	3	3:00
2006-12-02	Win	(Thailand) Jak Nakrantong		Perth, Australia	Decision	5	2:00
2006-07-26	Loss	(Russia) Maxim Grechkin	S-1 European Championships: Tsunami 2, semi final	Kaliningrad, Russia	Decision (unanimous)	3	3:00
2006-07-26	Win	(United Arab Emirates) Dzhabar Askerov	S-1 European Championships: Tsunami 2, quarter final	Kaliningrad, Russia	Decision (unanimous)	3	3:00
2004-10-26	Win	(Russia) Tagir Magomedov	Russian Muaythai League event	Moscow, Russia	KO	4	
Legend: Win Loss Draw/no contest Notes

Amateur kickboxing record
Date	Result	Opponent	Event	Location	Method	Round	Time
2017-07-29	Win	(Ukraine) Vasyl Sorokin	I.F.M.A. World Games 2017, Finals -75 kg	Wroclaw, Poland	Decision		
Wins the I.F.M.A. World Games 2017 Gold Medal -75 kg.
2017-07-29	Win	(United States) Troy Jones	I.F.M.A. World Games 2017, Semi-finals -75 kg	Poland	TKO	3	
2017-07-28	Win	(Portugal) Diogo Calado	I.F.M.A. World Games 2017, Quarter-finals -75 kg	Poland	Decision	3	
2017-05-08	Loss	(Portugal) Diogo Calado	2017 IFMA World Championships, Quarter-final	Minsk, Belarus	Decision (29:28)	3	
2016-05-29	Win	(Thailand) Ekkapan Somboonsab	I.F.M.A. World Muaythai Championships 2016, Finals -75 kg	Jönköping, Sweden	Decision (unanimous)	3	2:00
Wins the I.F.M.A. World Muaythai Championships Gold Medal -75 kg.
2014-09-	Win	(Ukraine) Vitali Nikiforov	2014 IFMA European Championships, Final	Kraków, Poland	Decision	3	3:00
Wins 2014 IFMA European Championship -75kg Gold Medal.
2014-09-	Win	(Russia) Vasily Semenov	2014 IFMA European Championships, Semi-finals	Kraków, Poland	Decision	3	3:00
2014-09-	Win	(Turkey) Ismail Cevikbas	2014 IFMA European Championships, Quarter-finals	Kraków, Poland	Decision	3	3:00
2013-10-23	Loss	(Russia) Zaynalabid Magomedov	2013 World Combat Games, Final	Bangkok, Thailand	Decision		
Wins 2013 World Combat Games Muay Thai -71kg Silver Medal.
2013-10-21	Win		2013 World Combat Games, Semi-final	Bangkok, Thailand	Decision		
2013-07-	Win	(Ukraine) Alim Nabiev	2013 IFMA European Championship, Final	Lisbon, Portugal	Decision	4	2:00
Wins 2013 IFMA European Championships -71kg Gold Medal.
2012-09-	Loss	(Russia) Zaynalabid Magomedov	I.F.M.A. World Muaythai Championships 2012, Final	Saint Petersburg, Russia	Decision	4	2:00
Wins 2012 IFMA World Championships -71kg Silver Medal.
2012-09-11	Win	(Thailand) Kem Sitsongpeenong	I.F.M.A. World Muaythai Championships 2012, Semi-finals	Saint Petersburg, Russia	Decision (majority)	4	2:00
2012-09-10	Win	(Ukraine) Enriko Gogokhia	I.F.M.A. World Muaythai Championships 2012, Quarter-finals	Saint Petersburg, Russia	Decision		
2012-05-23	Loss	(Russia) Zaynalabid Magomedov	2012 IFMA European Championships, Final	Antalya, Turkey	Decision	4	2:00
Wins 2012 IFMA European Championships -71kg Silver Medal.
2011-09-27	Win	(Russia) Konstantin Khuzin	I.F.M.A. World Championships 2011, Final -71 kg	Tashkent, Uzbekistan	Decision	4	2:00
Wins 2011 I.F.M.A. World Muaythai Championships Gold Medal -71kg.
2011-09-25	Win	(Ukraine) Enriko Gogokhia	I.F.M.A. World Championships 2011, Semi finals -71 kg	Tashkent, Uzbekistan	Decision	4	2:00
2011-09-24	Win	(Thailand) Direk Thongnoon	I.F.M.A. World Championships 2011, Quarter-finals -71 kg	Tashkent, Uzbekistan	Decision	4	2:00
2010-12-05	NC	(Russia) Magomedov Zaynalabin	I.F.M.A. World Championships 2010, Final -71 kg	Bangkok, Thailand	No contest		
Wins 2010 I.F.M.A. World Championships Silver Medal -71kg.
2010-05-30	Win	(Kazakhstan) Almaz Smagulov	I.F.M.A. European Muaythai Championships 2010, Final -71 kg	Velletri, Italy			
Wins 2010 I.F.M.A. European Muaythai Championships Gold Medal -71kg.
2010-05-29	Win	(Turkey) Ismail	I.F.M.A. European Muaythai Championships 2010, Semi-final -71 kg	Velletri, Italy			
2010-05-28	Win	(Croatia) Viktor Zaman	I.F.M.A. European Muaythai Championships 2010, Quarter-final -71 kg	Velletri, Italy			
2010-05-27	Win	(Sweden) Mathias Karlsson	I.F.M.A. European Muaythai Championships 2010, 1st round -71 kg	Velletri, Italy			
2009-12-05	Win	(Kazakhstan) Almas Smagulov	I.F.M.A. World Championships 2009, Final -71 kg	Bangkok, Thailand			
Wins 2009 I.F.M.A. World Championships Gold Medal -71kg.
2009-12-?	Win	(Ukraine) Petr Nakonechnyi	I.F.M.A. World Championships 2009, Semi-finals -71 kg	Bangkok, Thailand	Decision	4	2:00
2009-11-29	Win	(Sweden) Marcus Öberg	I.F.M.A. World Championships 2009, Quarter-finals -71 kg	Bangkok, Thailand	Decision	4	2:00
2009-05-?	Win	(Russia) Konstantin Khuzin	I.F.M.A. European Championships 2009, Final -71 kg	Liepāja, Latvia			
Wins 2009 I.F.M.A. European Championships Gold Medal -71kg.
2009-05-?	Win	(Croatia) Viktor Zaman	I.F.M.A. European Championships 2009, Semi-finals -71 kg	Liepāja, Latvia			
2009-05-?	Win	(Hungary) Barnabas Szucs	I.F.M.A. European Championships 2009, Quarter-finals -71 kg	Liepāja, Latvia			
2009-05-?	Win	(Kazakhstan) Almas Smagulov	I.F.M.A. European Championships 2009, 1st round -71 kg	Liepāja, Latvia			
2008-10-02	Win	(Ukraine) Petr Nakonechnyi	4th Busan TAFISA World Games, Final -71 kg	Busan, Korea			
Fight was for 2008 I.F.M.A. World Championship Gold Medal -71kg.
2008-09-30	Win	(Russia) Nariman Satiyev	4th Busan TAFISA World Games, Semi-finals -71 kg	Busan, Korea			
2007-03-11	Win	(Canada) Shane Campbell	W.M.F. World Championships 2007, Final	Bangkok, Thailand			
Wins 2007 W.M.F. World Championships Gold Medal -71 kg.
2006-03-26	Win	(Russia) Alexander Morev	W.M.F. World Championships 2006, Final	Bangkok, Thailand			
Wins 2006 W.M.F. World Championships Gold Medal -67 kg.
2006-03-24	Win	(Turkey) Adem Bozkurt	W.M.F. World Championships 2006, Semi-finals -67 kg	Bangkok, Thailand			
2006-11-26	Win	(Russia) Nikolay Bubnov	W.A.K.O. European Championships 2006, Thai-Boxing Final -67 kg	Skopje, Macedonia	Decision (unanimous)	3	2:00
Wins 2006 W.A.K.O. Thai Boxing European Championships Gold Medal -67 kg.
2006-11-25	Win	(Russia) Mikhail Mishin	W.A.K.O. European Championships 2006, Thai-Boxing Semi-final -67 kg	Skopje, Macedonia			
2006-11-24	Win	(Poland) Piotr Kobylanski	W.A.K.O. European Championships 2006, Thai-Boxing Quarter-final -67 kg	Skopje, Macedonia	Decision (unanimous)	3	2:00
2006-11-23	Win	(Azerbaijan) Ramil Nadirov	W.A.K.O. European Championships 2006, Thai-Boxing 1st round -67 kg	Skopje, Macedonia	Decision (unanimous)	3	2:00
2003-03-12	Win	(Portugal) Nuno Neves	I.A.M.T.F. 6th World Championships 2003, Final -61 kg	Bangkok, Thailand			
Wins 2003 I.A.M.T.F. World Championships Gold Medal -61 kg.
Legend: Win Loss Draw/no contest Notes

== See also ==
- List of male kickboxers
- List of K-1 events
