= Men's Thai-Boxing at W.A.K.O. European Championships 2006 Skopje -60 kg =

Men's Thai-Boxing at the W.A.K.O. European Championships 2006 (Skopje)
-51 kg
-54 kg
-57 kg
-60 kg
-63.5 kg
-67 kg
-71 kg
-75 kg
-81 kg
-86 kg
-91 kg
+91 kg

The men's lightweight (60 kg/118.8 lbs) Thai-Boxing division at the W.A.K.O. European Championships 2006 in Skopje was the fourth lightest of the male Thai-Boxing tournaments and involved nine fighters. Each of the matches was three rounds of two minutes each and were fought under Thai-Boxing rules.

As there were not enough men for a tournament fit for sixteen, seven of the fighters received a bye into the quarter-finals. The tournament gold medallist was Pashik Tatoyan from Russia who defeated Bahtiyar Iskanderzade from Azerbaijan in the final via a unanimous decision victory. Semi finalists Gor Shavelyan from Russia and Aleksandar Jankovic from Serbia received bronze medals for their efforts.

== Results ==
1st round
(Italy) Federico Laino
(Slovakia) Maros Pacan	D(3:0)

Quarter-finals
(Serbia) Aleksandar Janković	D(3:0)
(Slovakia) Maros Pacan
(Belarus) Andrei Zenkovich
(Russia) Pashik Tatoyan	D(3:0)
(Hungary) Tamás Birics
(Russia) Gor Shavelyan	D(3:0)
(Azerbaijan) Bahtiyar Iskanderzade	D(3:0)
(Portugal) Pedro Koll

Semi-finals
(Serbia) Aleksandar Janković
(Russia) Pashik Tatoyan	WIN
(Russia) Gor Shavelyan
(Azerbaijan) Bahtiyar Iskanderzade	WIN

Final
(Russia) Pashik Tatoyan	D(3:0)
(Azerbaijan) Bahtiyar Iskanderzade

=== Key ===
Abbreviation	Meaning
D (3:0)	Decision (Winners Score:Losers Score)
WIN	Victory - official record unclear

== See also ==
- List of WAKO Amateur European Championships
- List of WAKO Amateur World Championships
- List of male kickboxers
