= Petro Nakonechnyi =

Ukrainian kickboxer (born 1982)

- Born: 1982 (age 43–44); Odesa, Ukrainian SSR, Soviet Union
- Native name: Петро Наконечний
- Other names: Odessit ("Одессит")
- Nationality: (Ukraine) Ukrainian
- Height: 1.77 m (5 ft 10 in)
- Weight: 70 kg (150 lb; 11 st)
- Division: Welterweight; Middleweight
- Style: Muay Thai
- Team: Captain Odesa (1999 - 2013); BFC Liberec (2014 - )
- Trainer: Pavlo Yevtushenko, Martin Berka
- Years active: 2001–present

Kickboxing record
- Total: 43
- Wins: 34
- By knockout: 26
- Losses: 8
- Draws: 1

Petro Nakonechnyi (Ukrainian: Петро Наконечний; born 1982) is a Ukrainian welterweight Muay Thai kickboxer, fighting out of the Captain Odesa gym in Odesa. He is the K-1 MAX Ukraine 2006 and K-1 Europe MAX 2008 in Poland Champion.

== Biography and career ==
After making his name by winning numerous national and world Muay Thai titles, Nakonechnyi entered the K-1 promotion at K-1 East Europe MAX 2006 in March 2006 in Lithuania, where he defeated Belarusian fighter Vasily Shish. On November 24, 2006, he entered the 8-man Grand Prix at K-1 MAX Ukraine 2006 and won the tournament by defeating Dmitry Konstantinov, Aleksander Medvedev and Artem Sheglov.

In March the following year, he was invited to take part in the Grand Prix at K-1 East Europe MAX 2007 in Ukraine but was eliminated by Jurij Boreiko in the quarter-finals. He bounced back at K-1 Europe MAX 2008 in Poland in April 2008, however, as he advanced past Andrei Buda and Yury Harbachiov before defeating Michał Głogowski in the tournament final.

== Titles ==
- 2008 Busan TAFISA World Games IFMA Amateur Muay Thai 71 kg Gold medal
- 2008 K-1 Europe MAX in Poland tournament champion
- 2007 IFMA World Muay Thai Championships Bronze medal -75 kg
- 2007 Ukrainian Muay Thai champion (-75 kg)
- 2006 IFMA World Muay Thai Championships Silver medal -75 kg
- 2006 K-1 Ukraine MAX tournament champion
- 2005 10th Muay Thai National Championship of Ukraine champion (71 kg)
- 2004 IFMA World Muay Thai Championships Bronze medal -71 kg
- 2003 IFMA World Muay Thai Championships Silver medal 67 kg

== Kickboxing record ==
Kickboxing record
34 wins (26 KOs), 8 losses, 1 draw
Date	Result	Opponent	Event	Location	Method	Round	Time	Notes
October 23, 2015	Win	(Czech Republic) Martin Gaňo	Heroes Gate 15	Prague, Czech Republic	TKO (spinning back kick)	4	-	
September 26, 2015	Win	(Slovakia) Miroslav Smolar	MČR K-1, European Cup WAKO	Prague, Czech Republic	Decision	3	3:00	Win 2015 Czech K-1 Champion -71 kg
September 26, 2015	Win	(Armenia) Gor Harutjunjan	MČR K-1, European Cup WAKO	Prague, Czech Republic	Decision	3	3:00	K-1 Czech 2015 Semi-Final
September 26, 2015	Win	(Czech Republic) Radek Veřmířovský	MČR K-1, European Cup WAKO	Prague, Czech Republic	KO	-	-	K-1 Czech 2015 Quarter-Final
May 24, 2015	Win	(Slovakia) Pavol Garaj	Simply The Best 4	Prague, Czech Republic	Decision	3	3:00	
April 25, 2015	Win	(Czech Republic) Michal Krčmář	Night of Warriors 7	Liberec, Czech Republic	Decision	3	3:00	
November 29, 2014	Win	(Serbia) Marko Adamovič	Night of Warriors 6	Liberec, Czech Republic	Decision	3	3:00	
December 2009	Loss	(Belarus) Vitaly Gurkov	I.F.M.A. World Championships 2009, Semi Finals -71 kg	Bangkok, Thailand	Decision	4	2:00	
December 19, 2008	Loss	(Belarus) Vitaly Gurkov	"The Contender Asia" Season 2 Russia Super 8 Qualifier, Semi Finals	Chelyabinsk, Russia	Decision (unanimous)	3	3:00	
October 2, 2008	Win	(Belarus) Vitaly Gurkov	4th Busan TAFISA World Games, Final -71 kg	Busan, South Korea	-	-	-	Wins 2008 I.F.M.A. World Championship Gold Medal -71 kg.
September 30, 2008	Win	(Sweden) Marcus Öberg	4th Busan TAFISA World Games	Busan, South Korea	Decision (unanimous)	4	2:00	
April 6, 2008	Win	(Poland) Michał Głogowski	K-1 Europe MAX 2008 in Poland	Warsaw, Poland	Decision (unanimous)	3	3:00	2008 Poland Grand Prix final.
April 6, 2008	Win	(Belarus) Yury Harbachiov	K-1 Europe MAX 2008 in Poland	Warsaw, Poland	KO (spinning back kick)	2	0:27	2008 Poland Grand Prix semi-final.
April 6, 2008	Win	(Romania) Andrei Buda	K-1 Europe MAX 2008 in Poland	Warsaw, Poland	Decision (unanimous)	3	3:00	2008 Poland Grand Prix quarter-final.
December 4, 2007	Loss	(Russia) Artem Levin	WMC IFMA World Muaythai Championships	Bangkok, Thailand	Decision	4	3:00	
March 17, 2007	Loss	(Latvia) Jurij Boreiko	K-1 East Europe MAX 2007	Dnipropetrovsk, Ukraine	Extra round decision	4	3:00	2007 Lithuania Grand Prix quarter-final.
November 24, 2006	Win	(Russia) Artem Sheglov	K-1 MAX Ukraine 2006	Dnipropetrovsk, Ukraine	Decision	3	3:00	2006 Ukraine Grand Prix final.
November 24, 2006	Win	(Ukraine) Oleksandr Medvedev	K-1 MAX Ukraine 2006	Dnipropetrovsk, Ukraine	Decision	3	3:00	2006 Ukraine Grand Prix semi-final.
November 24, 2006	Win	(Russia) Dmitry Konstantinov	K-1 MAX Ukraine 2006	Dnipropetrovsk, Ukraine	Decision	3	3:00	2006 Ukraine Grand Prix quarter-final.
March 10, 2006	Win	(Belarus) Vasily Shish	K-1 East Europe MAX 2006	Vilnius, Lithuania	Extra round decision (majority)	4	3:00	
June 7, 2006	Loss	(Russia) Artem Levin	WMF World Muaythai Championships finals	Bangkok, Thailand	-	-	-	For WMC IFMA World Muay Thai Championships 75 kg gold medal.
December 19, 2002	Loss	(Belarus) Vasily Shish	Belarus vs Australia	Bilohirsk, Ukraine	Decision	5	3:00	
Legend: Win Loss Draw/No contest

== See also ==
- K-1
- List of K-1 events
- List of male kickboxers
