= Vasily Shish =

Belarusian kickboxer

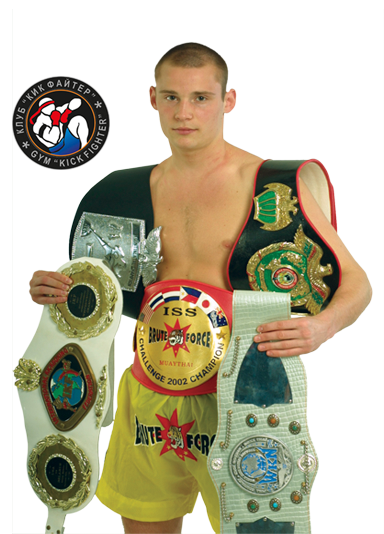
- Shish with his belts
- Born: 7 August 1982 (age 44)
- Other names: Torero
- Nationality: Belarus
- Height: 1.80 m (5 ft 11 in)
- Weight: 70 kg (150 lb; 11 st)
- Division: Middleweight; Welterweight; Super Lightweight
- Style: Muay Thai
- Stance: Orthodox
- Fighting out of: Minsk, Belarus
- Team: Gym "Kick Fighter" (1996-2003); Chinuk Gym (2004-2008)
- Trainer: J.Gosha, E.Dobrotvorski, D.Pyastski

Kickboxing record
- Total: 51
- Wins: 37
- By knockout: 17
- Losses: 12
- Draws: 2

Mixed martial arts record
- Total: 1
- Wins: 0
- Losses: 1

Amateur record
- Total: 71
- Wins: 60
- Losses: 11
- Last updated on: 4 June 2011

Vasily "Torero" Shish (born 7 August 1982) is a Belarusian Muay Thai middleweight kickboxer from Minsk, Belarus. He is a five time world and five time European Muaythai and kickboxing champion who has won titles at both amateur and professional level. Vasily has fought for several notable promotions such as K-1 MAX and (the now defunct) Thai & Kickbox SuperLeague.

== Career/Biography ==
Growing up in Minsk, Vasily joined the famous Gym "Kick Fighter" in 1996 where he studied Muay Thai alongside future world champions such as Andrei Kulebin, Aliaksei Pekarchyk and Dmitry Shakuta. In 1998 he won his first title as an amateur at the I.A.M.T.F. European Championships in Spain, winning a gold medal in the -51 kg category aged just 15 years old, also winning the honour of "best technique". The next year he went to the world championships in Bangkok where he won a bronze medal competing against much more experienced fighters. In 1999 he was part of the Belarus team which won an incredible eight gold medals (out of twelve) in the Thai-boxing section at the W.A.K.O. world championships. What was even more impressive was that seven of the winners came from Vasily's Kick Fighter gym.

In 2000 Vasily won his first pro title (I.K.F. world) by defeating American Richard Kostuck in less than 29 seconds in Minsk. He carried on in an excellent year by winning a gold medal at the amateur European Muaythai championships before finishing the year with a gold medal in Sydney at the World Cup in Martial Arts event. Between 2001 and 2003 Vasily won more amateur and pro world and European titles with the I.A.M.T.F., I.S.S/Brute Force, W.A.K.O. and World Kickboxing Network (W.K.N.) organizations, moving up in weight and relinquishing his I.K.F. world title as he did so. By 2003 Vasily sought more competitive matches joining the newly created Thai & Kickbox SuperLeague where he would be given the chance to fight world champions every event. Things did not go exactly as planned for Vasily and he only had two fights with the organization – losing both.

By 2004 Vasily had parted from his longtime gym "Kick Fighter" after seven years and joined the rival Chinuk Gym in Minsk. With his new gym he had the opportunity to make up for his disappointing SuperLeague performances after being called up by the then world's biggest kickboxing organization K-1 to take part in an elimination match for the 2005 K-1 MAX final. Vasily faced a daunting task in Tokyo, with the reigning champion Buakaw Por.Pramuk standing in the way of a place of the final 8. After three rounds it was clear that Vasily had no chance of upsetting the odds on favorite, losing every round in a third round unanimous decision loss.

Since his K-1 MAX appearance Vasily has been on the fringes of the kickboxing scene, taking many fights across the border in Russia with the highlight being holding the W.B.K.F. European title between 2006 and 2007. He has also made a number of appearances on smaller European promotions such as Klash and Janus Fight with limited success, wins against Paolo Balicha and Michal Hansgut being nullified by defeats against Alviar Lima, Paulo Balicha and Fadi Merza.

== Titles ==
Professional

- 2006-07 W.B.K.F. European champion (0 title defences)
- 2003 W.K.N. Muaythai super lightweight world champion -66.7 kg
- 2002 I.S.S./Brute Force world champion
- 2002 WKA Interconinental champion
- 2001 WKN European champion
- 2000 I.K.F. Pro Muaythai super lightweight world champion -62.2 kg (0 title defences - vacated)

Amateur

- 2002 W.A.K.O. European championships in Jesolo, Italy (gold) -67 kg
- 2002 I.A.M.T.F. European championships in Cyprus (gold) -67 kg
- 2001 I.A.M.T.F. World Muaythai Championships in Bangkok, Thailand (silver) -63.5 kg
- 2000 World Cup in Martial Arts in Sydney, Australia (gold) -63.5 kg
- 2000 I.A.M.T.F. European championships in Athens, Greece (gold) -63.5 kg
- 1999 W.A.K.O. World Championships in Caorle, Italy (gold) -63.5 kg
- 1999 I.A.M.T.F. World Muaythai Championships in Bangkok, Thailand (bronze) -63.5 kg
- 1998 I.A.M.T.F. European championships in Calafell, Spain (gold) -51 kg

== Professional Kickboxing record ==
Professional Kickboxing Record
37 Wins (17 (T)KO's), 12 Losses, 2 Draws
Date	Result	Opponent	Event	Location	Method	Round	Time
2008-04-20	Loss	(Syria) Fadi Merza	Fight Night Vienna	Vienna, Austria	Decision	3	3:00
2007-12-15	Loss	(Portugal) Paulo Balicha	Swiss Las Vegas II	Basel, Switzerland	Decision	3	3:00
Fight was for W.F.C. junior middleweight world title -69.85 kg.
2007-10-26	Loss	(Cape Verde) Alviar Lima	KlasH III "Show of No Mercy"	Sibiu, Romania	Decision (Unanimous)	3	3:00
2007-03-21	Loss	(Russia) Konstantin Sbitov	Fight Club Arbat	Moscow, Russia	TKO		
Loses W.B.K.F. European title -71 kg.
2006-11-06	Win	(Russia) Nikolai Koreneev	BARS - European Welterweight Championship '06	Moscow, Russia	Decision (Majority)	8	3:00
Wins W.B.K.F. European title -71 kg.
2006-11-06	Win	(Russia) Artur Shamkhalov	Ufa Fight Night	Ufa, Russia	KO	5	
2006-07-21	Loss	(Ukraine) Petr Nakonechnyi	S-1 European Elimination - Round 1	Russia	Decision	3	3:00
2006-06-21	Draw	(Kyrgyzstan) Kumar Zhaliev	Fight Club Arbat	Moscow, Russia	Decision Draw	3	3:00
2006-03-10	Loss	(Ukraine) Petr Nakonechnyi	K-1 East Europe MAX 2006, Super Fight	Vilnius, Lithuania	Ext.R Decision (Majority)	4	3:00
2005-11-19	Loss	(France) Yassine Benhadj	Janus Fight 2005, Semi Final	Padua, Italy	Decision	3	3:00
2005-11-19	Win	(Czech Republic) Michal Hansgut	Janus Fight 2005, Quarter Final	Padua, Italy	KO (High Kick)	2	
2005-10-26	Draw	(Kyrgyzstan) Alen Ofoyo	Fight Club Arbat	Moscow, Russia	Decision Draw	3	3:00
2005-09-30	Loss	(France) Farid Khider	Kings of Muaythai: Belarus vs Europe	Minsk, Belarus	Decision	5	3:00
Fight was for W.K.N. Muay Thai super lightweight European title -66.7 kg.
2005-09-24	Win	(Portugal) Paulo Balicha	Fight Night Winterthur	Winterthur, Switzerland	TKO	4	
2005-06-15	Loss	(Russia) Alexei Krasko	Fight Club Arbat	Moscow, Russia	Decision	3	3:00
2005-05-04	Loss	(Thailand) Buakaw Por. Pramuk	K-1 World MAX 2005 World Tournament Open	Tokyo, Japan	Decision (Unanimous)	3	3:00
Fails to qualify for K-1 World MAX 2005 Championship Final.
2004-10-27	Win	(Ukraine) Alexandr Demchenko	Fight Club Arbat	Moscow, Russia	KO		
2004-10-26	Win	(Russia) Elbrus Dzhumakov	Russian Muaythai League	Moscow, Russia	KO	3	
2004-05-19	Win	(Russia) Sergey Zemnevich	Fight Club Arbat	Moscow, Russia	Decision (Unanimous)	3	3:00
2003-09-27	Loss	(Netherlands) Chris van Venrooij	SuperLeague Germany 2003	Wuppertal, Germany	Decision	5	3:00
2003-05-10	Loss	(France) Eddy Saban	SuperLeague Austria 2003	Vienna, Austria	Decision	5	3:00
2002-12-19	Win	(Ukraine) Petr Nakonechnyi	Belarus vs Ukraine	Bilohirsk, Ukraine	Decision	5	3:00
2002-00-00	Win	(Thailand)	Brute Force Challenge	Pattaya, Thailand	Decision	5	3:00
Wins I.S.S/Brute Force Muaythai world title.
2002-09-14	Win	(Syria) Baker Barakat	Night of KO	Sopot, Poland	KO	3	
Wins W.K.N. Muaythai super lightweight world title -66.7 kg.
2002-00-00	Win	(United States) James Cook	Belarus vs USA	New York, NY, USA	Decision	5	3:00
2000-00-00	Win	(Australia)	Belarus vs Australia	Sydney, Australia	KO		
2000-06-29	Win	(Thailand) Kongdej Ratanachot	Russia vs Thailand	Novosibirsk, Russia	Decision	5	3:00
2000-00-00	Win	(Thailand) Parynya Dongtiamsee	Belarus vs Thailand	Minsk, Belarus	Decision	5	3:00
2000-01-14	Win	(United States) Richard Kostuck	USA vs Belarus	Minsk, Belarus	TKO (Doc Stop/Cut by Elbow)	1	0:38
Wins I.K.F. Pro Muaythai super lightweight world title -62.2 kg.
Legend: Win Loss Draw/No contest Notes

== Mixed Martial Arts record ==
MMA Record
0 Wins, 1 Loss
Date	Result	Opponent	Event	Location	Method	Round	Time
2006-08-23	Loss	(United Arab Emirates) Dzhabar Askerov	Belorechensk Fight Night 2	Belorechensk, Russia	Submission	1	
Legend: Win Loss Draw/No contest Notes

== See also ==
- List of WAKO Amateur World Championships
- List of WAKO Amateur European Championships
- List of male kickboxers
