= Men's Thai-Boxing at W.A.K.O. European Championships 2006 Skopje -75 kg =

Men's Thai-Boxing at the W.A.K.O. European Championships 2006 (Skopje)
-51 kg
-54 kg
-57 kg
-60 kg
-63.5 kg
-67 kg
-71 kg
-75 kg
-81 kg
-86 kg
-91 kg
+91 kg

The men's middleweight (75 kg/165 lbs) Thai-Boxing division at the W.A.K.O. European Championships 2006 in Skopje was the fifth heaviest of the male Thai-Boxing tournaments involving eight fighters. Each of the matches was three rounds of two minutes each and were fought under Thai-Boxing rules.

The tournament gold medal was won by Yury Harbachov of Belarus who beat Russia's Mikhail Chalykh in the final. Defeated semi finalists Kamel Mezatni of France and Aleksandre Stajkovski of hosts Macedonia both claimed bronze medals for their efforts in reaching the semi-final stage.

== Results ==
Quarter-finals
(Belarus) Yury Harbachov	KO
(Hungary) Adam Szolnoki
(France) Kamel Mezatni	KO
(Croatia) Marko Benzon
(North Macedonia) Aleksandre Stajkovski	D(2:1)
(Bulgaria) Nikolay Atanasov
(Slovakia) Patrik Tóth
(Russia) Mikhail Chalykh	D(3:0)

Semi-finals
(Belarus) Yury Harbachov	WIN
(France) Kamel Mezatni
(North Macedonia) Aleksandre Stajkovski
(Russia) Mikhail Chalykh	WIN

Final
(Belarus) Yury Harbachov	WIN
(Russia) Mikhail Chalykh

=== Key ===
Abbreviation	Meaning
D (2:1)	Decision (Winners Score:Losers Score)
KO	Knockout
TKO	Technical Knockout
AB	Abandonment (Injury in match)
WO	Walkover (No fight)
DQ	Disqualification

== See also ==
- List of WAKO Amateur European Championships
- List of WAKO Amateur World Championships
- List of male kickboxers
