= Dzianis Hancharonak =

Belarusian kickboxer

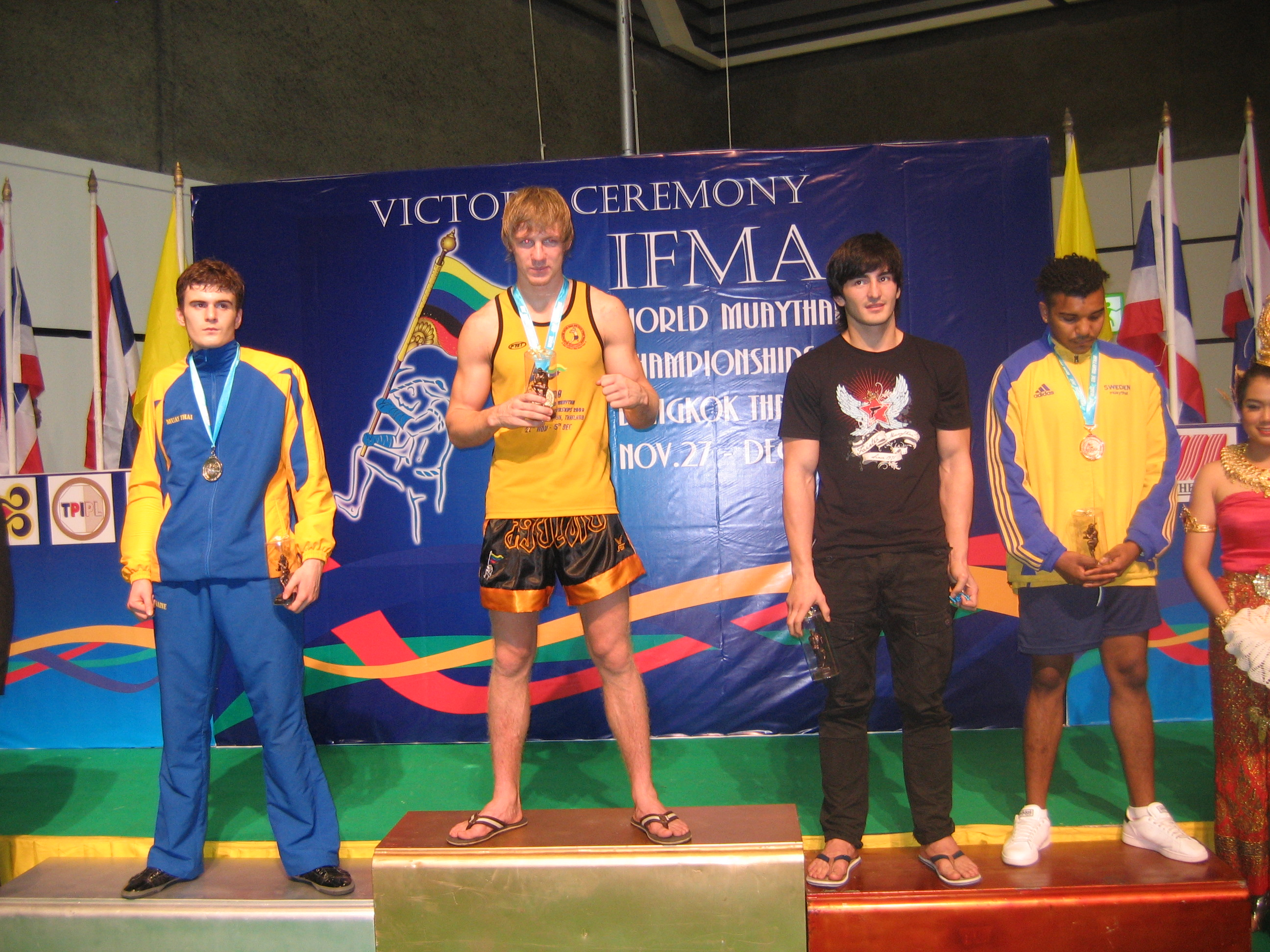
- Born: Дзянic Алегавiч Ганчаронак; 21 June 1988 (age 38)
- Native name: Дзянic Ганчаронак
- Nationality: Belarusian
- Height: 1.93 m (6 ft 4 in)
- Weight: 91 kg (201 lb; 14.3 st)
- Division: Heavyweight
- Reach: 76.0 in (193 cm)
- Style: Muay Thai
- Stance: Orthodox
- Fighting out of: Minsk, Belarus
- Team: Patriot Gym
- Trainer: Dmitry Piasetsky; Oleg Vadaturskiy
- Years active: 2000-present

Kickboxing record
- Total: 33
- Wins: 27
- By knockout: 16
- Losses: 5
- Draws: 1

Amateur record
- Total: 157
- Wins: 154
- By knockout: 106
- Losses: 3
- Draws: 0
- Last updated on: 14 June 2014

Dzianis Hancharonak (Belarusian: Дзянic Алегавiч Ганчаронак; born 21 June 1988), sometimes spelt Denis Goncheronok, is a Belarusian heavyweight Muay Thai kickboxer fighting out of Minsk for Patriot Gym. He is a five-time amateur Muay Thai I.F.M.A world champion and holds a national degree of honored master of sports in Muay Thai. Inside the amateur ring, he enjoyed victories over notable athletes including: Nenad Pagonis, Franci Grajš, Simon Marcus and Vladimir Mineev.

== Amateur career ==
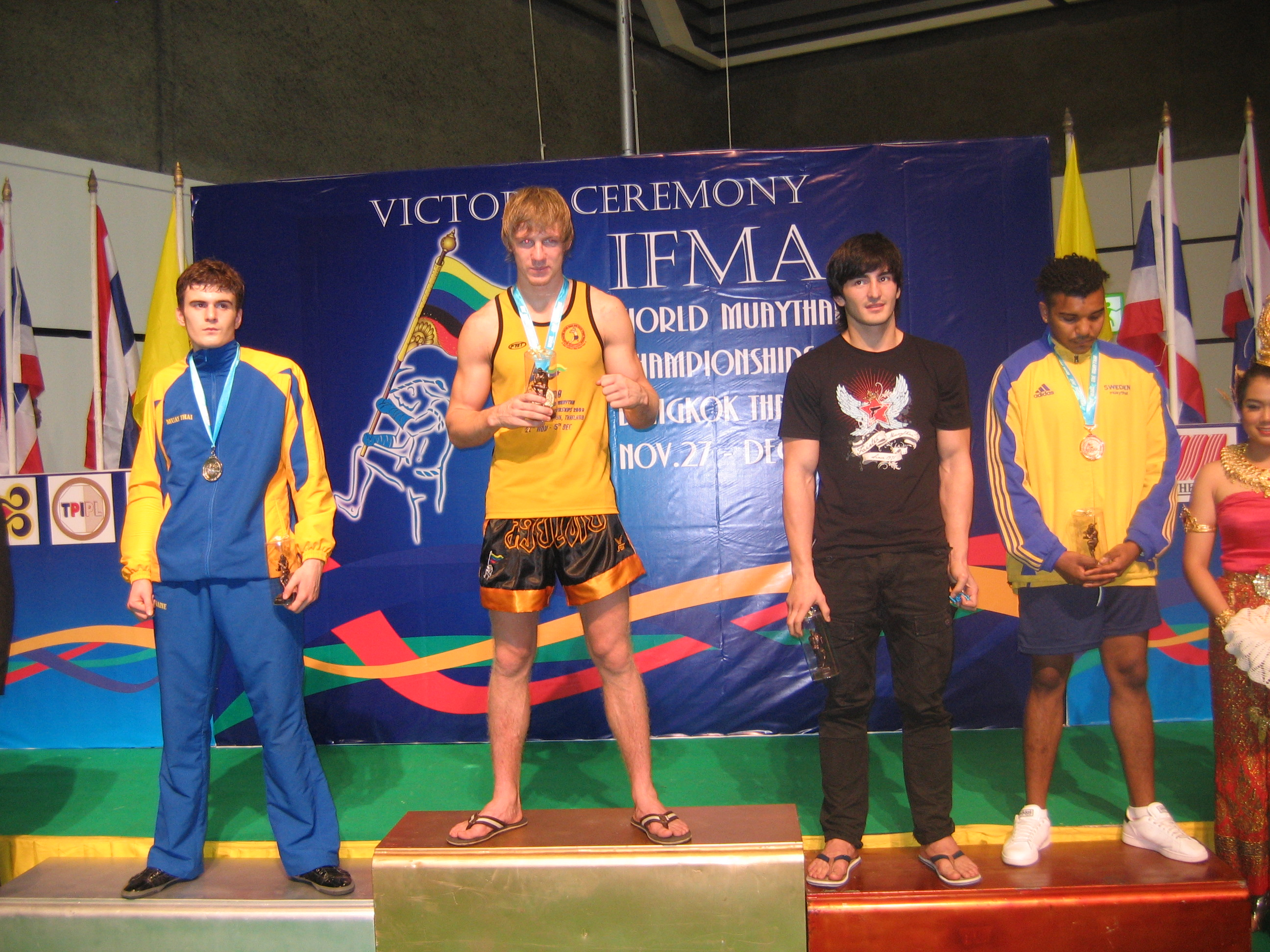
Dzianis wins 2009 IFMA WC.

Dzianis has been a prominent member of the Belarusian Muay Thai national team. He won his first major international tournament during his teens, which was the 2006 I.F.M.A World Championships in -81 kg category. In 2006, when Dzianis finished high school, he continued to pursue his Muay Thai career under renowned Belarusian trainer Dmitry Piasetsky. Blood, sweat and tears in this tough training regimen earned him multiple titles from recognized Muay Thai and kickboxing organizations including I.F.M.A and W.A.K.O. Dzianis has had more than 260 amateur fights not only in Thailand, home country of Muay Thai, but all over the world. In 2010, he won the World Combat Games in Beijing, China.

== Professional career ==
Although still competing in international amateur championships as is required of the national team member, Dzianis is very passionate about professional fights. Dzianis has fought 10 professional bouts, chalking up an impressive K.O. victory over Netherlands' Boy Boy Martin on 19 March 2010, in K-1 World Max 2010 East Europe Tournament. On 30 July 2011, Dzianis took on Redouan Cairo in Las Vegas, Nevada, United States. The action started immediately and after being knocked down twice in the second round, Hancharonak came back with the TKO in round three.

Twice, Dzianis was meant to take on Australian heavyweight Nathan Corbett: in 2011 when both were in one group in a Muay Thai Premier League tournament, but the promotion group collapsed, and then on 9 March 2013, however the fight never materialized.

There was no winner in a rematch against Redouan Cairo at Kickboxing Empire II in Las Vegas, Nevada, United States on 8 March 2014 as the fight ended up in draw.

He challenged Artem Vakhitov in a fight for the vacant WMC World Heavyweight (-95 kg/209 lb) Championship at Monte Carlo Fighting Masters 2014 in Monte Carlo, Monaco on 14 June 2014, losing a unanimous decision.

== Titles ==
=== Amateur ===
- International Federation of Muaythai Associations
  - 2017 I.F.M.A World Championship in Minsk, Belarus (gold) -91 kg
  - 2016 I.F.M.A World Championship in Jönköping, Sweden (gold) -91 kg
  - 2014 I.F.M.A World Championship in Langkawi, Malaysia (gold) -91 kg
  - 2013 I.F.M.A European Championship 2013 in Lisbon, Portugal (gold) -91 kg
  - 2012 I.F.M.A World Championship in St. Petersburg, Russia (gold) -91 kg
  - 2012 I.F.M.A European Championship in Antalya, Turkey (gold) -91 kg
  - 2011 I.F.M.A World Championship in Tashkent, Uzbekistan (gold) -91 kg
  - 2011 I.F.M.A European Championship in Antalya, Turkey (gold) -91 kg
  - 2010 I.F.M.A World Championship in Bangkok, Thailand (silver) -91 kg
  - 2009 I.F.M.A World Championship in Bangkok, Thailand (gold) -91 kg
  - 2008 I.F.M.A World Championship in Bangkok, Thailand (gold) -86 kg
  - 2008 I.F.M.A European Championship in Zgorzelec, Poland (gold) -86 kg
  - 2006 I.F.M.A World Championship in Bangkok, Thailand (gold) -81 kg
- World Muaythai Federation
  - 2007 W.M.F European Championship in Vigo, Spain (gold) -81 kg
- World Association of Kickboxing Organizations
  - 2009 W.A.K.O. World Championships in Villach, Austria (silver) -86 kg (K-1 rules)
  - 2008 W.A.K.O. European Championships in Oporto, Portugal (gold) −86 kg (K-1 rules)
  - 2006 W.A.K.O European Thai-Boxing Championship in Skopje, Macedonia (gold) -81 kg

== Fight record (incomplete) ==
Professional kickboxing and Muay Thai record
27 wins (16 KOs), 5 losses, 1 draw
Date	Result	Opponent	Event	Location	Method	Round	Time
2016-12-23	Loss	(Ukraine) Oleg Pryimachov	Wu Fight	Foshan, China	Decision (unanimous)	3	3:00
2016-08-23	Win	(Tunisia) Yousri Belgaroui	Akhmat Fight Show	Grozny, Russia	Decision (unanimous)	3	3:00
2014-06-14	Loss	(Russia) Artem Vakhitov	Monte Carlo Fighting Masters 2014	Monte Carlo, Monaco	Decision (unanimous)	5	3:00
For the WMC World Heavyweight (-95.0 kg/209 lb) Championship.
2014-03-08	Draw	(Suriname) Redouan Cairo	Kickboxing Empire II	Las Vegas, Nevada, USA	Draw (split)	5	3:00
2013-01-05	Win	(Moldova) Adrian Cuşnir	Kickboxing Elimination Tournament	Minsk, Belarus	TKO	1	
2012-03-11	Loss	(Russia) Mikhail Tyuterev	K-1 Best Fighter	Samara, Russia	Decision	4	3:00
2011-07-30	Win	(Suriname) Redouan Cairo	Kickboxing Empire I	Las Vegas, Nevada, USA	KO	3	2:06
2010-03-19	Win	(Netherlands) Boy Boy Martin	K-1 World Max 2010 East Europe Tournament	Minsk, Belarus	KO	1	1:20
2007-04-14	Win	(Lithuania) Myle Mindaugas	Gladiators	Estonia	KO	1	
2005	Win	(Russia) Imanali Gamzatov	RAMTL Fights	Moscow, Russia	Decision	4	
Legend: Win Loss Draw/No contest Notes

Amateur Muay Thai and kickboxing record
Date	Result	Opponent	Event	Location	Method	Round	Time
2017-05-12	Win	(Czech Republic) Jakub Klauda	2017 IFMA World Championships, Final	Minsk, Belarus	Decision (30:27)	3	3:00
Wins 2017 IFMA World Championships -91kg Gold Medal.
2017-05-10	Win	(Germany) Jakob Styben	2017 IFMA World Championships, Semi Final	Minsk, Belarus	Decision (30:27)	3	3:00
2017-05-06	Win	(Turkey) Batmas Olcay	2017 IFMA World Championships, Quarter Final	Minsk, Belarus	RSCH	1	
2016-05-	Loss	(Ukraine) Oleg Pryimachov	2016 IFMA World Championships -91 kg, Final	Jönköping, Sweden	Decision	3	3:00
Wins the 2016 IFMA World Championships -91 kg Silver Medal.
2015-08-	Loss	(Russia) Artem Vakhitov	2015 IFMA World Championships, Quarter Final	Bangkok, Thailand	Decision	3	3:00
2014-05-09	Win	(Russia) Ivan Pentka	2014 IFMA World Championships -91 kg, Final	Langkawi, Malaysia			
Wins the 2014 IFMA World Championships -91 kg Gold Medal.
2014-05-07	Win	(Denmark) Fredy Langawagen	2014 IFMA World Championships -91 kg, Semi Finals	Langkawi, Malaysia	Decision	4	2:00
2014-05-04	Win	(Ukraine) Oleg Pryimachov	2014 IFMA World Championships -91 kg, Quarter Finals	Langkawi, Malaysia	Decision	4	2:00
2014-05-03	Win	(Lithuania) Sergej Maslobojev	2014 IFMA World Championships -91 kg, Open Round	Langkawi, Malaysia	TKO (injury)		
2013-07-	Win	(Russia) Vladimir Mineev	2013 IFMA European Championship, Final	Lisbon, Portugal	Decision	4	2:00
Wins 2013 IFMA European Championships -91kg Gold Medal.
2012-09-13	Win	(Uzbekistan) Yusuf Ibqagimov	2012 IFMA World Championships, Final	Bangkok, Thailand	Decision	4	2:00
Wins 2012 IFMA World Championships -91kg Gold Medal.
2012-09-11	Win	(Ukraine) Alexander Oleinik	2012 IFMA World Championships, Semi Final	Bangkok, Thailand	Decision	4	2:00
2012-05-	Win	(Russia) Dzhavatkhan Atakov	2012 IFMA European Championships, Final	Antalya, Turkey	Decision	4	2:00
Wins 2012 IFMA European Championships -91kg Gold Medal.
2011-09-27	Win	(Slovenia) Franci Grajs	I.F.M.A. World Championships 2011, Final	Tashkent, Uzbekistan	Decision	4	2:00
Wins 2011 I.F.M.A. World Muaythai Championships Gold Medal -91kg.
2011-09-25	Win	(Iran) Shahram	I.F.M.A. World Championships 2011, Semi Final	Tashkent, Uzbekistan	Decision	4	2:00
2011-04-	Win	(Turkey) Mehmet Ozer	2011 IFMA European Championships, Final	Antalya, Turkey	Decision	4	2:00
Wins 2011 I.F.M.A. European Muaythai Championships Gold Medal -91kg.
2011-04-	Win	(Ukraine) Tsotne Rogava	2011 IFMA European Championships	Antalya, Turkey	Decision	4	2:00
2010-12-	Loss	(Czech Republic) Ondřej Hutník	2010 I.F.M.A. World Muaythai Championships, Finals	Bangkok, Thailand			
Wins 2010 IFMA World Championships -91kg Silver Medal.
2010-12-	Win		2010 I.F.M.A. World Muaythai Championships, Semi Finals	Bangkok, Thailand			
2010-09-02	Win	(China) Wang Wen Zhong	2010 World Combat Games -91 kg Muay Thai, Final	Beijing, China	Decision (3:2)	4	2:00
Wins SportAccord World Combat Games -91 kg gold medal.
2010-09-02	Win	(Australia) Thor Hoopman	2010 World Combat Games -91 kg Muay Thai, Semi Final	Beijing, China	Decision		
2009-12-	Win	(Ukraine) Tsotne Rogava	2009 IFMA World Championships, Final	Bangkok, Thailand	Decision	4	2:00
Wins 2009 IFMA World Championships -91kg Gold Medal.
2009-10-26	Loss	(Serbia) Nenad Pagonis	W.A.K.O World Championships 2009, K-1 Final -86 kg	Villach, Austria			
Wins W.A.K.O. World Championship '09 K-1 Silver Medal -86 kg.
2009-10-24	Win	(Poland) Radoska Rydzewski	W.A.K.O World Championships 2009, K-1 Semi Finals -86 kg	Villach, Austria			
2008-11	Win	(Serbia) Nenad Pagonis	W.A.K.O European Championships 2008, K-1 Final -86 kg	Porto, Portugal	Decision (unanimous)	3	2:00
Wins W.A.K.O. European Championship '08 K-1 Silver Medal -86 kg.
2008-11	Win	(United Kingdom) Khalid Ismail	W.A.K.O European Championships 2008, K-1 Semi Finals -86 kg	Porto, Portugal	KO		
2008-11	Win	(Portugal) Emanuel Silva	W.A.K.O European Championships 2008, K-1 Quarter Finals -86 kg	Porto, Portugal	KO		
2006-11	WO	(Bulgaria) Ivan Damianov	W.A.K.O European Championships 2006, Thai-Boxing Rules Final -81 kg	Skopje, Macedonia	WO (no fight)		
Wins W.A.K.O. European Championship '06 Thai-Boxing Rules Gold Medal -81 kg.
2006-11	Win	(Ukraine) Dmytro Kirpan	W.A.K.O European Championships 2006, Thai-Boxing Rules Semi Finals -81 kg	Skopje, Macedonia			
2006-11	Win	(North Macedonia) Nenad Slavkovski	W.A.K.O European Championships 2006, Thai-Boxing Rules Quarter Finals -81 kg	Skopje, Macedonia	KO		
2006-11	Win	(Azerbaijan) Araz Ismayilov	W.A.K.O European Championships 2006, Thai-Boxing Rules First Round -81 kg	Skopje, Macedonia	Decision (unanimous)	3	2:00
Legend: Win Loss Draw/no contest Notes

== See also ==
- List of male kickboxers
- List of K-1 events
