= Men's Thai-Boxing at W.A.K.O. European Championships 2006 Skopje -67 kg =

Men's Thai-Boxing at the W.A.K.O. European Championships 2006 (Skopje)
-51 kg
-54 kg
-57 kg
-60 kg
-63.5 kg
-67 kg
-71 kg
-75 kg
-81 kg
-86 kg
-91 kg
+91 kg

The men's welterweight (67 kg/147.4 lbs) Thai-Boxing division at the W.A.K.O. European Championships 2006 in Skopje was the sixth lightest of the male Thai-Boxing tournaments and was the largest in terms of participants involving thirteen fighters. Each of the matches was three rounds of two minutes each and were fought under Thai-Boxing rules.

Due to the fact there were not enough competitors for a tournament designed for sixteen, three of the men had byes into the quarter-finals. The tournament gold medal went to rising amateur Muay Thai star Vitaly Gurkov of Belarus who defeated Nikolay Bubnov of Russia by unanimous decision in the final to claim gold. Defeated semi finalists Mikhail Mishin from Russia and Nebojsa Denic from Serbia won bronze.

== Results ==
1st round
(Belarus) Vitaly Gurkov	D(3:0)
(Azerbaijan) Ramil Nadirov
(Bulgaria) Miroslav Petrov
(Russia) Mikhail Mishin	TKO
(Serbia) Nebojsa Denic	WO
(North Macedonia) Aleksandar Nikolovski
(Austria) Adil Osmani
(Hungary) Roland Vörös	D(2:1)
(France) Boubou Traore
(Russia) Nikolay Bubnov	D(3:0)

Quarter-finals
(Poland) Piotr Kobylański
(Belarus) Vitaly Gurkov	D(3:0)
(Croatia) Nikola Bozic
(Russia) Mikhail Mishin	D(3:0)
(Italy) Massimiliano Girardi
(Serbia) Nebojsa Denic	D(2:1)
(Hungary) Roland Vörös
(Russia) Nikolay Bubnov	D(2:1)

Semi-finals
(Belarus) Vitaly Gurkov	WIN
(Russia) Mikhail Mishin
(Serbia) Nebojsa Denic
(Russia) Nikolay Bubnov	WIN

Final
(Belarus) Vitaly Gurkov	D(3:0)
(Russia) Nikolay Bubnov

=== Key ===
Abbreviation	Meaning
D (2:1)	Decision (Winners Score:Losers Score)
KO	Knockout
TKO	Technical Knockout
AB	Abandonment (Injury in match)
WO	Walkover (No fight)
DQ	Disqualification

== See also ==
- List of WAKO Amateur European Championships
- List of WAKO Amateur World Championships
- List of male kickboxers
