= Men's Thai-Boxing at W.A.K.O. European Championships 2006 Skopje -71 kg =

Men's Thai-Boxing at the W.A.K.O. European Championships 2006 (Skopje)
-51 kg
-54 kg
-57 kg
-60 kg
-63.5 kg
-67 kg
-71 kg
-75 kg
-81 kg
-86 kg
-91 kg
+91 kg

The men's light middleweight (71 kg/156.2 lb) Thai-Boxing division at the W.A.K.O. European Championships 2006 in Skopje was the sixth heaviest of the male Thai-Boxing tournaments and involved ten fighters. Each of the matches was three rounds of two minutes each and were fought under Thai-Boxing rules.

As there were too few men for a tournament of sixteen, eight of the men went straight into the quarter-finals. The tournament winner was Dominic Brown of Great Britain who defeated fellow Rizvan Isaev in the final to claim gold. Defeated semi finalists Ile Risteski from host nation Macedonia and Milos Mihaljevic from Serbia won bronze. There were also several notable names that went out in the early stages with K-1 MAX regional champion José Reis losing in the 1st round and 2004 European champion Vadzim Mazanik going out in the quarter-finals.

== Results ==
1st round
(Bosnia and Herzegovina) Alem Veljković
(Russia) Rizvan Isaev	KO
(Portugal) José Reis
(United Kingdom) Dominic Brown	D(3:0)

Quarter-finals
(North Macedonia) Ile Risteski	D(3:0)
(Bulgaria) Bokyo Isaev
(Italy) Ramadani Yaziz
(Russia) Rizvan Isaev	D(3:0)
(Hungary) István Tóth
(Serbia) Milos Mihaljevic	KO
(Belarus) Vadzim Mazanik
(United Kingdom) Dominic Brown	D(3:0)

Semi-finals
(North Macedonia) Ile Risteski
(Russia) Rizvan Isaev	WIN
(Serbia) Milos Mihaljevic
(United Kingdom) Dominic Brown	WIN

Final
(Russia) Rizvan Isaev
(United Kingdom) Dominic Brown	WIN

=== Key ===
Abbreviation	Meaning
D (2:1)	Decision (Winners Score:Losers Score)
KO	Knockout
TKO	Technical Knockout
AB	Abandonment (Injury in match)
WO	Walkover (No fight)
DQ	Disqualification

== See also ==
- List of WAKO Amateur European Championships
- List of WAKO Amateur World Championships
- List of male kickboxers
