= Oleg Pryimachov =

Ukrainian kickboxer

- Born: Олег Миколайович Приймачов; 11 November 1989 (age 36); Lubny, Ukrainian SSR, Soviet Union
- Other names: Oleh Prymachov
- Height: 200 cm (6 ft 7 in)
- Weight: 110.4 kg (243 lb; 17.39 st)
- Division: 91 kg (2011 - 2023); Heavyweight (2024 - Present)
- Style: Muay Thai, Kickboxing
- Stance: Southpaw
- Fighting out of: Poltava, Ukraine

Kickboxing record
- Total: 22
- Wins: 16
- By knockout: 5
- Losses: 5
- By knockout: 2
- Draws: 1

Other information
- University: Kyiv National Economic University

Oleg Mykolayovych Pryimachov (Ukrainian: Олег Миколайович Приймачов; born November 11, 1989) is a Ukrainian Muay Thai and kickboxing fighter. In amateur Muay Thai, he is a five time IFMA world championship gold medalist and a two times World Games gold medalist. As a professional in kickboxing, he competes for Glory.

== Biography ==
Pryimachov was born and raised in Lubny where he started sports with football. After serving a term in the army, he graduated from college and started to work at his local tax office. He started training in Muay Thai at the age of 21 and competed both as an amateur and as a professional in parallel of his day job for multiple years.

From the first day of the full-scale invasion of Russia into Ukraine, Pryimachov joined the ranks of the Poltava Teroborona and started to conduct free training of soldiers for the Legion of volunteer battalion.

He later joined the special unit "Artan" of the Main Intelligence Directorate of the Ministry of Defense of Ukraine. For his engagement he received the Order of Merit of the first degree.

== Kickboxing career ==
=== Early career ===
Pryimachov faced Alexander Volobuyev on February 24, 2021, at W5 Fighter Moscow X. He lost the fight by split decision.

On November 8, 2012, Pryimachov faced Mihail Koldorkin at W5 FIGHTER. He won the fight second-round knockout.

On November 16, 2013, Pryimachov faced Kirill Ivanov at W5 Grand Prix Orel XXII. The fight was declared a draw.

On November 29, 2014, Pryimachov defeated Ivan Bartek by decision at the W5 FIGHTER "CROSSROAD OF TIMES" event.

On June 27, 2015, Pryimachov took part in the KICK & WIN Summer Grand Prix 2015. In the semifinals he defeated Andrey Osadchy by decision. In the finals he defeated Andrey Embolayev, also by decision.

On September 4, 2015, Prymachov defeated Vladimir Oleynik by decision at the multi discipline event Battle of Champions 8.

=== Chinese circuit ===
On June 25, 2016, Pryimachov faced Sergej Maslobojev at Faith Fight Fighting Championship. He lost the fight by unanimous decision.

On October 28, 2016, Pryimachov faced Man Jiangang at Wu Fight in Foshan, China. He won the bout by knockout.

Pryimachov faced Hao Guanghua at Wu Lin Feng World Championship 2017 on January 14, 2017. He won the fight by first-round knockout.

Pryimachov was scheduled to face Julius Mocka at EM Legend 18 on April 28, 2017. Mocka was replaced by Mongolian fighter Ankhaa. Pryimachov won the fight by first-round knockout. Pryimachov was scheduled to face Fabio Kwasi at EM Legend 19 on May 27, 2017. He won the fight by doctor stoppage in the second round.

On January 20, 2018, Pryimachov faced Carlos Ulberg at EM Legend. He won the fight by unanimous decision. Pryimachov and Ulberg rematched on April 21, 2018, at EM Legend 30. Pryimachov lost the bout by unanimous decision after he received an 8 count.

On June 27, 2019, Pryimachov defeated Aleksandar Danilovic by first-round knockout at the Megdan 5 event.

=== Glory ===
Ath the end of 2019 Pryimachov signed a two-year contract with the Glory promotion. His debut was postponed multiple times, first due to the COVID-19 pandemic and later due to the Russian invasion of Ukraine.

Pryimachov signed a new contract with Glory in 2024 and was scheduled to debut against Abderrahman Barkouch at Glory Collision 7 on December 7, 2024. He won the fight by unanimous decision.

Pryimachov takes part in the Glory 99 “Heavyweight Last Man Standing Tournament” Opening Round event where 32 heavyweight fighters compete on April 5, 2025 in Rotterdam, Netherlands. He faced Sofian Laidouni and lost by first round technical knockout.

== Championships and accomplishments ==
=== Amateur ===
- Ukrainian Muay Thai Federation
  - 2013 Ukrainian Muay Thai Cup -91 kg (gold)
- International Federation of Muaythai Associations
  - 2014 IFMA European Championship -91 kg (gold)
  - 2015 IFMA World Championship -91 kg (bronze)
  - 2016 IFMA World Championship -91 kg (gold)
  - 2018 IFMA World Championship -91 kg (gold)
  - 2019 IFMA World Championship -91 kg (gold)
  - 2021 IFMA World Championship -91 kg (gold)
  - 2023 IFMA European Championship -91 kg (gold)
  - 2024 IFMA World Championship +91 kg (gold)
- Arafura Games
  - 2019 Arafura Games Muay Thai -91 kg (gold)
- European Games
  - 2023 European Games Muaythai -91 kg (gold)
- World Games
  - 2017 World Games Muaythai -91 kg (gold)
  - 2022 World Games Muaythai -91 kg (gold)
- World Combat Games
  - 2023 World Combat Games -91 kg (silver)

== Fight record ==
Professional Muay Thai and Kickboxing Record
16 wins (7 (T)KO's), 5 losses, 1 draw
| Date | Result | Opponent | Event | Location | Method | Round | Time |
| 2025-04-05 | Loss | (Algeria) Sofian Laidouni | Glory 99 - Last Heavyweight Standing, Opening Round | Rotterdam, Netherlands | TKO (3 Knockdowns) | 1 | 1:47 |
| 2024-12-07 | Win | (Morocco) Abderrahman Barkouch | Glory Collision 7 | Arnhem, Netherlands | Decision (Unanimous) | 3 | 3:00 |
| 2019-06-27 | Win | (Montenegro) Aleksandar Danilovic | Megdan 5 | Sremska Mitrovica, Serbia | KO (Body kick) | 1 | 1:47 |
| 2018-04-21 | Loss | (New Zealand) Carlos Ulberg | EM Legend 30 | Emei, China | Decision (Unanimous) | 3 | 3:00 |
| 2018-01-20 | Win | (New Zealand) Carlos Ulberg | EM Legend 27 | Kunming, China | Decision (unanimous) | 3 | 3:00 |
| 2017-09-29 | Win | (Russia) Mikhail Tyuterev | EM Legend 23 | Yilong, China | Decision (unanimous) | 3 | 3:00 |
| 2017-05-27 | Win | (Netherlands) Fabio Kwasi | EM Legend 19 | Jiangyou, China | TKO (Doctor stoppage) | 2 | 0:40 |
| 2017-04-28 | Win | (Mongolia) Ankhaa | EM Legend 18 | Dujiangyan, China | KO (Body punches) | 1 | |
| 2017-01-14 | Win | (China) Hao Guanghua | Wu Lin Feng World Championship 2017 | Zhengzhou, China | KO (Knee to the body) | 1 | |
| 2016-12-23 | Win | (Belarus) Dzianis Hancharonak | Wu Fight | Foshan, China | Decision (unanimous) | 3 | 3:00 |
| 2016-10-28 | Win | (China) Man Jiangang | Wu Fight | Foshan, China | KO (Left cross) | 1 | |
| 2016-06-25 | Loss | (Lithuania) Sergej Maslobojev | FF fighting championship | Shenzhen, China | Decision (Unanimous) | 3 | 3:00 |
| 2015-11-06 | Win | (China) Zhang Chang | Wu Lin Feng World Championship 2015 | Anshan, China | KO (Knee to the head) | 2 | |
| 2015-09-04 | Win | (Russia) Vladimir Oleynik | Battle of Champions 8 | Vladivostok, Russia | Decision | 3 | 3:00 |
| 2015-06-27 | Win | (Ukraine) Andrey Embolayev | KICK & WIN Summer Grand Prix, Final | Kyiv, Ukraine | Decision | 3 | 3:00 |
| 2015-06-27 | Win | (Ukraine) Andrey Osadchy | KICK & WIN Summer Grand Prix, Semifinals | Kyiv, Ukraine | Decision | 3 | 3:00 |
| 2014-11-29 | Win | (Slovakia) Ivan Bartek | W5 FIGHTER "CROSSROAD OF TIMES" | Bratislava, Slovakia | Decision | 3 | 3:00 |
| 2013-11-16 | Draw | (Russia) Kirill Ivanov | W5 Grand Prix Orel XXII | Oryol, Russia | Decision | 3 | 3:00 |
| 2012-11-08 | Win | (Russia) Mihail Koldorkin | W5 FIGHTER "MILK MOSCOW" | Moscow, Russia | TKO (Left cross) | 2 | |
| 2012-04-12 | Loss | (Belarus) Valentin Slavikovsky | Fight Code | Minsk, Belarus | KO | 1 | |
| 2012-02-24 | Loss | (Russia) Alexander Volobuyev | W5 Fighter Moscow X | Moscow, Russia | Decision (Split) | 3 | 3:00 |
Legend: Win Loss Draw/No contest Notes

Amateur Muay Thai Record
| Date | Result | Opponent | Event | Location | Method | Round | Time |
|---|---|---|---|---|---|---|---|
| 2024-06-09 | Win | (Russia) Dmitrii Vasenev | IFMA 2024 World Championships, Final | Patras, Greece | Decision (29:28) | 3 | 3:0 |
Wins the 2024 IFMA World Championships +91kg Gold Medal.
| 2024-06-06 | Win | (Belarus) Valiantsin Kapytou | IFMA 2024 World Championships, Semifinals | Patras, Greece | KO (body shot) | 2 | |
| 2024-06-05 | Win | (Turkey) Umut Eryilmaz | IFMA 2024 World Championships, Quarterfinals | Patras, Greece | Decision (30:24) | 3 | 3:00 |
| 2023-12-14 | Win | (Turkey) Ahmet Coban | IFMA 2023 European Championships, Final | Antalya, Turkey | TKO | | |
Wins the 2023 IFMA European Championships -91 kg Gold Medal.
| 2023-12-10 | Win | (Greece) Kyriakos Bakirtzis | IFMA 2023 European Championships, Semifinals | Antalya, Turkey | TKO | 1 | |
| 2023-10-30 | Loss | (Russia) Gadzhi Medzhidov | World Combat Games 2023, Final | Riyadh, Saudi Arabia | Walk over | | |
Wins the 2023 World Combat Games -91 kg Silver Medal.
| 2023-10-29 | Win | (Russia) Gadzhi Medzhidov | World Combat Games 2023, Semifinals | Riyadh, Saudi Arabia | Decision (29:28) | 3 | 3:00 |
| 2023-10-28 | Win | (Morocco) Othmane Fekaki | World Combat Games 2023, Quarterfinals | Riyadh, Saudi Arabia | TKO | 1 | |
| 2023-06-27 | Win | (Italy) Enrico Pellegrino | IFMA at the 2023 European Games, Final | Kraków, Poland | Decision (30:27) | 3 | 3:00 |
Wins 2023 European Games −91 kg Gold Medal.
| 2023-06-26 | Win | (Greece) Kyriakos Bakirtzis | IFMA at the 2023 European Games, Semifinal | Kraków, Poland | Decision (29:28) | 3 | 3:00 |
| 2023-05-25 | Win | (Croatia) Toni Catipovic | IFMA at the 2023 European Games, Quarterfinal | Kraków, Poland | Decision (30:26) | 3 | 3:00 |
| 2022-07-17 | Win | (United States) Matthew Baker | 2022 World Games, Final | Birmingham, United States | Decision (30:27) | 3 | 3:00 |
Wins 2022 World Games −91 kg Gold Medal.
| 2022-07-16 | Win | (France) Jacky Jeanne | 2022 World Games, Semifinals | Birmingham, United States | TKO | | |
| 2022-07-15 | Win | (Uzbekistan) Fanat Kakhramonov | 2022 World Games, Quarterfinal | Birmingham, United States | TKO | | |
| 2021-12-11 | Win | (Russia) Vadim Dmitriev | IFMA World Championships 2021, Final | Phuket, Thailand | Decision (30:27) | 3 | 3:00 |
Wins 2021 IFMA World Championships −91 kg Gold Medal.
| 2021-12-10 | Win | (Iran) Hamidreza Kordabadi | IFMA World Championships 2021, Semifinals | Phuket, Thailand | Decision (29:28) | 3 | 3:00 |
| 2021-12-09 | Win | (Poland) Lukasz Radosz | IFMA World Championships 2021, Quarterfinals | Phuket, Thailand | Decision (30:27) | 3 | 3:00 |
| 2019-07-28 | Win | (Czech Republic) Jakub Klauda | IFMA World Championships 2019, Final | Bangkok, Thailand | Decision (30:27) | 3 | 3:00 |
Wins 2019 IFMA World Championships −91 kg Gold Medal.
| 2019-07-27 | Win | (Russia) Nadir Iskhakov | IFMA World Championships 2019, Semifinals | Bangkok, Thailand | KO | 2 | |
| 2019-07-25 | Win | (Morocco) Othmane Fekaki | IFMA World Championships 2019, Quarterfinals | Bangkok, Thailand | KO | 2 | |
| 2019-05-02 | Win | (Czech Republic) Jakub Klauda | Arafura Games 2019, Final | Australia | Decision (30:27) | 3 | 3:00 |
Wins 2019 Arafura Games −91 kg Gold Medal.
| 2018-05-18 | Win | (Russia) Gadzhi Medzhidov | IFMA World Championships 2018, Final | Cancún, Mexico | Decision (30:27) | 3 | 3:00 |
Wins 2018 IFMA World Championships −91 kg Gold Medal.
| 2018-05-15 | Win | (Italy) Raffaele Vitale | IFMA World Championships 2018, Semifinals | Cancún, Mexico | Decision (30:27) | 3 | 3:00 |
| 2018-05-13 | Win | (Spain) Lorenzo Jimenez Martinez | IFMA World Championships 2018, Quarterfinals | Cancún, Mexico | TKO | 2 | |
| 2018-05-13 | Win | (Turkmenistan) Ivan Isminov | IFMA World Championships 2018, First Round | Cancún, Mexico | Decision | 3 | 3:00 |
| 2017-07-30 | Win | (Poland) Łukasz Radosz | 2017 World Games, Final | Wrocław, Poland | Walk Over | | |
Wins 2017 World Games Muaythai −91 kg Gold Medal.
| 2017-07-29 | Win | (Germany) Jakob Styben | 2017 World Games, Semifinals | Wrocław, Poland | Decision (30:27) | 3 | 3:00 |
| 2017-07-28 | Win | (Slovenia) Rok Erste | 2017 World Games, Quarterfinals | Wrocław, Poland | TKO | 1 | |
| 2016-05- | Win | (Belarus) Dzianis Hancharonak | 2016 IFMA World Championships, Final | Jönköping, Sweden | Walk Over | | |
Wins the 2016 IFMA World Championships -91 kg Gold Medal.
| 2016-05- | Win | (Iran) Majid Fallah | 2016 IFMA World Championships, Semi Final | Jönköping, Sweden | Decision | 3 | 3:00 |
| 2015-08- | Loss | (Russia) Artem Vakhitov | 2015 IFMA World Championships, Semifinals | Bangkok, Thailand | Decision | 3 | 3:00 |
Wins 2015 IFMA World Championships -91kg Bronze Medal.
| 2015-08- | Win | (Turkey) Gurkan Kucuk | 2015 IFMA World Championships, Quarterfinals | Bangkok, Thailand | TKO | 1 | |
| 2014-09-28 | Win | (Russia) Semen Shelepov | 2014 IFMA European Championships, Final | Kraków, Poland | Decision | 4 | 2:00 |
Wins 2014 IFMA European Championships -91kg Gold Medal.
| 2014-09-28 | Win | (Turkey) Emre Haslaman | 2014 IFMA European Championships, Semifinals | Kraków, Poland | Decision | 4 | 2:00 |
| 2014-05-04 | Loss | (Belarus) Dzianis Hancharonak | 2014 IFMA World Championships, Quarter Finals | Langkawi, Malaysia | Decision | 4 | 2:00 |
| 2013-07-27 | Loss | (Russia) Vladimir Mineev | 2013 IFMA European Championship, Semi Final | Lisbon, Portugal | Decision | 4 | 2:00 |
Wins 2013 IFMA European Championships -91kg Bronze Medal.
| 2013- | Win | (Ukraine) Alexander Oleinik | 2013 Ukrainian Cup, Final | Kyiv, Ukraine | Decision | 3 | 3:00 |
Wins 2013 Ukrainian Cup -91kg Gold Medal.
Legend: Win Loss Draw/No contest Notes
