= Marcus Öberg =

Swedish martial artist

- Born: Marcus Öberg; February 18, 1982 (age 44); Malmö, Sweden
- Nationality: (Sweden) Swedish
- Height: 1.80 m (5 ft 11 in)
- Weight: 71 kg (157 lb; 11.2 st)
- Division: Middleweight
- Style: Muay Thai
- Fighting out of: Malmö, Sweden
- Team: Malmö Muay Thai
- Trainer: Larry Lindwall
- Years active: 2003–present

Kickboxing record
- Total: 34
- Wins: 27
- By knockout: 7
- Losses: 7
- By knockout: 0
- Last updated on: June 12, 2010

Marcus Öberg (born February 18, 1982) is a Swedish middleweight Muay Thai fighter and kickboxer fighting out of Malmö Muay Thai Gym in Malmö. He is a former two time Swedish champion and K-1 Scandinavia MAX 2008 tournament winner.

== Titles ==
- 2010 SportAccord Combat Games silver medal 71 kg
- 2008 K-1 Scandinavia MAX champion
- 2008 Busan TAFISA World Games IFMA Amateur Muay Thai 71 kg bronze medal
- 2008 Swedish IFMA Muay Thai champion 71 kg
- 2006 Swedish IFMA Muay Thai champion 75 kg
- 2006 Champions Fight Night 4-man tournament champion

== Fight record ==
Kickboxing record
27 wins (7 (T)KOs, 20 decisions), 7 losses
Date	Result	Opponent	Event	Location	Method	Round	Time
2011-03-12	Win	(Morocco) Khalid Bourdif	Fight Code: Dragon Series Round 2	Milan, Italy	Decision	3	3:00
2010-11-27	Loss	(Ukraine) Artur Kyshenko	K-1 Scandinavia Rumble of the Kings 2010	Stockholm, Sweden	Decision	3	3:00
2010-06-12	Win	(Morocco) Faldir Chahbari	Beast of the East 2010 Poland	Gdynia, Poland	Ext. R decision (unanimous)	4	3:00
2009-11-20	Win	(Armenia) Gago Drago	K-1 Rumble of the Kings 2009 in Stockholm	Stockholm, Sweden	Decision (unanimous)	3	3:00
2009-02-27	Win	(United Arab Emirates) Dzhabar Askerov	K-1 Scandinavia 2009 Norrköping	Norrköping, Sweden	Ext R. (decision)	4	3:00
2008-05-31	Win	(United Arab Emirates) Dzhabar Askerov	K-1 Scandinavia MAX 2008, Final	Stockholm, Sweden	TKO (referee stop/cut)	3	0:43
2008-05-31	Win	(Sweden) Joakim Karlsson	K-1 Scandinavia MAX 2008, Semi Final	Stockholm, Sweden	Ext. R decision (unanimous)	4	3:00
2008-05-31	Win	(Sweden) Mattias Karlsson	K-1 Scandinavia MAX 2008, Quarter Final	Stockholm, Sweden	Ext. R decision (unanimous)	4	3:00
2007-09-15	Win	(Netherlands) Hesdy van Assen	King of the Ring	Malmö, Sweden	Decision (majority)	5	3:00
2007-05-20	Loss	(United Kingdom) Harvey Harra	K-1 UK MAX Tournament 2007 Pain & Glory	London, England	Decision (unanimous)	3	3:00
2007-04-28	Win	(Poland) Piotr Woznicki	Fightnight	Höör, Sweden	KO	1	
2006-12-16	Win	(Finland) Hannu Vappula	Travelfight	Uppsala, Sweden	Decision (unanimous)	5	3:00
2006-09-30	Win	(Sweden) William Schafferer	Champions Fight Night 2	Halmstad, Sweden	Decision	3	3:00
Wins Champions Fight Night 4-man tournament title.
2006-09-30	Win	(Sweden) Josef Fjällgren	Champions Fight Night 2	Halmstad, Sweden			
2005-08-27	Win	(Denmark) Bassam Chahrour		Kalundborg, Denmark	Decision (unanimous)	5	3:00
Legend: Win Loss Draw/no contest Notes

Amateur Muay Thai record
Date	Result	Opponent	Event	Location	Method	Round	Time
2010-09-02	Loss	(Thailand) Teerapong Dee	SportAccord Combat Games, Final -71 kg	Beijing, China	Decision (3-2)	4	2:00
Wins SportAccord Combat Games Muay Thai -71kg Silver medal.
2010-08-31	Win	(China) Zhang Xias Long	SportAccord Combat Games, Semi Finals -71 kg	Beijing, China	Decision (3-2)	4	2:00
2010-08-29	Win	(South Africa) Bakhulule Baai	SportAccord Combat Games, Quarter Finals -71 kg	Beijing, China	Decision (5-0)	4	2:00
2009-11-29	Loss	(Belarus) Vitaly Gurkov	IFMA 2009 World Muaythai Championships, Quarter Finals -71 kg	Bangkok, Thailand	Decision	4	2:00
2008-09-30	Loss	(Ukraine) Petr Nakonechnyi	4th Busan TAFISA World Games	Busan, Korea	Decision (unanimous)	4	2:00
2008-09-29	Win	(Finland) Tomi Karttunen	4th Busan TAFISA World Games	Busan, Korea	Decision (unanimous)	4	2:00
2008-09-29	Win	(Netherlands) Daniel van	4th Busan TAFISA World Games	Busan, Korea	Decision (unanimous)	4	2:00
2008-04-23	Win	(Sweden) Nima Rafiei	SM Thaiboxing 2008 Finals	Stockholm, Sweden	Decision (split)	5	3:00
Wins Swedish IFMA Muaythai 2008 (67-71 kg) title.
2008-04-19	Win	(Sweden) Dan Jentzen	SM Thaiboxing 2008 quarter finals	Stockholm, Sweden	TKO (corner stoppage)	1	
2007-12-03	Loss	(Thailand) Samaan Yaba	IFMA World Championships	Bangkok, Thailand	Decision (unanimous)	4	2:00
2007-12-01	Win	(France) Gafary Boussary	IFMA World Championships	Bangkok, Thailand	Decision (unanimous)	4	2:00
2007-11-29	Win	(Russia) Denis Dikusar	IFMA World Championships	Bangkok, Thailand	Decision (unanimous)	4	2:00
2006-02-19	Win	(Sweden) Josef Fjällgren	Swedish Muaythai championships	Stockholm, Sweden	Decision (unanimous)	5	3:00
Wins Swedish IFMA Muaythai 2006 (-75kg) title.
2006-02-17	Win	(Sweden) Kim Hansson	Swedish Muaythai championships	Stockholm, Sweden	Decision (split)	5	3:00
Legend: Win Loss Draw/no contest Notes

== See also ==
- List of K-1 champions
- List of male kickboxers
