= W.A.K.O. World Championships 1999 =

W.A.K.O. World Championships 1999 (Caorle)
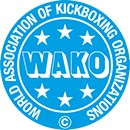
- The poster for W.A.K.O. World Championships 1999 (Caorle)
- Promotion: W.A.K.O.
- Date: November, 1999
- City: Caorle, Italy

Event chronology
W.A.K.O. World Championships 1999 (Bishkek)	W.A.K.O. World Championships 1999 (Caorle)	W.A.K.O. European Championships 2000 (Moscow)

W.A.K.O. World Championships 1999 were the joint twelfth world kickboxing championships (the other was held the same year in Bishkek, Kyrgyzstan) hosted by the W.A.K.O. organization. It was the fifth championships (world and European) to be held in Italy and was open to amateur men and women from fifty countries across the world.

There were five categories available at Caorle, much more than at the previous European championships. The categories on offer included; Full-Contact, Thai-Boxing (men only), Light-Contact, Semi-Contact and Musical Forms. By the end of the championships Belarus was the top nation, just about shading second place Russia due to her incredible record in Thai-boxing, while Italy came in third. The event was held in Caorle, Italy in November, 1999.

== Participating nations ==
There were fifty nations from five continents across the world participating at the 1999 W.A.K.O. World Championships in Caorle:

- Argentina
- Austria
- Azerbaijan
- Bangladesh
- Belarus
- Bosnia and Herzegovina
- Brazil
- Canada
- Croatia
- Cuba
- Czech Republic
- Denmark
- Egypt
- Estonia
- Finland
- France
- Gabon
- (Georgia (country)) Georgia
- Germany
- (United Kingdom) Great Britain
- Greece
- Hungary
- (Republic of Ireland) Ireland
- Iran
- Israel
- Italy
- Kazakhstan
- Lebanon
- Lithuania
- (North Macedonia) Macedonia
- Morocco
- Norway
- Palestine
- Poland
- Portugal
- (Republika Srpska) Republic of Srpska
- Russia
- Serbia and Montenegro
- Slovakia
- Slovenia
- South Africa
- Spain
- Sweden
- Switzerland
- Trinidad and Tobago
- Tunisia
- Turkey
- Ukraine
- United States
- Uzbekistan

== Full-Contact ==
Full-Contact is a form of kickboxing where fights are won primarily by point's decision or referee stoppage, with kicks and punches allowed above the waist, although unlike professional kickboxing, head and body protection is compulsory - more detail on Full-Contact rules are available on the W.A.K.O. website. At Caorle the men had twelve weight divisions ranging from 51 kg/112.2 lbs to over 91 kg/+200.2 lbs, while the women had seven (one more than at Leverkusen) ranging from 48 kg/105.6 lbs to over 70 kg/+143 lbs, with an extra weight class being added (+70 kg). Notable winners in this category included Mariusz Cieśliński who won his third W.A.K.O. world championship gold medal, Aleksandr Povetkin who would go to achieve greater renown as a pro boxer, and Natascha Ragosina who would later become a multiple world champion in women's boxing. By the end of the championships Russia were easily the dominant nation in Full-Contact, winning five gold medals, three silver and three bronze in total.

=== Men's Full-Contact Kickboxing Medals Table ===
Event	Gold	Silver	Bronze
Light Bantamweight -51 kg	Nurzhan Erbusinov (Kazakhstan)	Nikolaj Bolotnikov (Bulgaria)	Damian Ławniczak (Poland); Artem Kashkurtsev (Ukraine)
Bantamweight -54 kg	Mariusz Cieśliński (Poland)	Ihor Pavlenko (Ukraine)	Jimmi Lillie (Denmark); Kenneth Johansen (Norway)
Featherweight -57 kg	Thomas Karlsson (Sweden)	Marat Erdenov (Belarus)	Patrick Salamon (Slovakia); Rocco Cipriano (Switzerland)
Lightweight -60 kg	Tarik Madni (Morocco)	Dubier Migi (France)	Giampaolo Spano (Italy); Achmed Oligov (Russia)
Light Welterweight -63.5 kg	Oleksandr Filonenko (Ukraine)	Marco Seifert (Germany)	Robert Arvai (Hungary); Badre Belhaja (Morocco)
Welterweight -67 kg	Terje Arildsen (Norway)	Youssef Lattaoui (France)	Mariusz Ziętek (Poland); Mirza Barijaktarevic (Croatia)
Light Middleweight -71 kg	Thomas Kristiansen (Norway)	Robert Nowak (Poland)	Tony Cote (France); Salko Zildžić (Bosnia and Herzegovina)
Middleweight -75 kg	Pasi Rantala (Finland)	Yerzhan Shegenov (Kazakhstan)	Oleg Ktenin (Ukraine); Stanislav Sestak (Lithuania)
Light Heavyweight -81 kg	Aleksei Solovjov (Russia)	Vitaly Samusenko (Belarus)	Alessio Rondelli (Italy); Slobodan Marinković (Serbia and Montenegro)
Cruiserweight -86 kg	Igor Shevel (Ukraine)	Dmitri Vorobjov (Estonia)	Jan Reinmann (Germany); Goran Scekici (Republika Srpska)
Heavyweight -91 kg	Havag Mankiev (Russia)	Imre Gergely (Hungary)	Gergely Csölle (Slovakia); Joan Latsonas (Greece)
Super Heavyweight +91 kg	Aleksandr Povetkin (Russia)	Patrik Matejka (Slovakia)	Josip Bodrozic (Croatia); Steve Boyd (Republic of Ireland)

=== Women's Full-Contact Kickboxing Medals Table ===
Event	Gold	Silver	Bronze
Bantamweight -48 kg	Oksana Ivasiva (Ukraine)	Naila Moustafina (Russia)	Veronique Legras (France); Hülya Şahin (Turkey)
Featherweight -52 kg	Viktoria Rudenko (Ukraine)	Mina Duoujji (Morocco)	Goranka Blagojevici (Serbia and Montenegro); Elena Kazpatcheva (Russia)
Lightweight -56 kg	Henriette Birkeland (Norway)	Tatiana Tchalaja (Russia)	Marion Fiedler (Germany); Ayse Rita Stevens (Turkey)
Middleweight -60 kg	Anna Kasprzak (Poland)	Julia Voskoboinik (Lebanon)	Fatima Rguig (Morocco); Julie Nemtsova (Russia)
Light Heavyweight -65 kg	Tanja Vujic (Serbia and Montenegro)	Izina Sinetskaja (Russia)	Csilla Bodo (Hungary); Kelly Morse (United States)
Heavyweight -70 kg	Ivana Derdic (Croatia)	Bojana Trajkovic (Serbia and Montenegro)	Tania Van Zyl (South Africa)
Super Heavyweight +70 kg	Natascha Ragosina (Russia)	Kabira Rochai (Morocco)	Joanne Brooks (United States); Kateryna Vlasova (Ukraine)

== Thai-Boxing ==
The most physical type of kickboxing available at W.A.K.O. championships, Thai-boxing (more commonly known as Muay Thai) allows the contestants to kick, punch, use elbows and knees in an attempt to win their matches – often by a point’s decision or via a referee stoppage. Unlike the professional version, W.A.K.O. amateur events enforce the wearing of head, body and leg protection by the competitors. In Caorle only men were allowed to participate in Thai-boxing, with twelve weight classes ranging from 51 kg/112.2 lbs to over 91 kg/+200.2 lbs. Notable winners in the style included future pro world champions Vasily Shish, Dmitry Shakuta and Vitali Akhramenko, with their nation Belarus being by far the strongest nation in Thai-boxing, winning eight gold and two bronze medals. Even more remarkable was that seven of these winners all trained together at the Kick Fighter Gym in Minsk.

=== Men's Thai-Boxing Medals Table ===
Event	Gold	Silver	Bronze
Light Bantamweight -51 kg	Dmitry Koren (Belarus)	Ahmad Shaikho (Lebanon)	Alberto Costa (Portugal); Dragan Durmić (Serbia and Montenegro)
Bantamweight -54 kg	Alexei Pekarchik (Belarus)	Sergey Smananskiy (Ukraine)	Ayman Saleh (Lebanon); Joszef Rebrei (Hungary)
Featherweight -57 kg	Evgeny Gvozdev (Belarus)	Oleksiy Neskyy (Ukraine)	Rachid Boumalek (Morocco); Ehsan Rastegar Mogadam (Iran)
Lightweight -60 kg	Sergei Shishlov (Belarus)	Gennadiy Papu (Kazakhstan)	Oleksiy Filinonov (Ukraine); Giorgo Chakvetadze (Georgia (country))
Light Welterweight -63.5 kg	Vasily Shish (Belarus)	Alexandr Pogozelov (Russia)	Andriy Rassolov (Ukraine); Behroz Rastegar Mogadam (Iran)
Welterweight -67 kg	Fikri Tijarti (Morocco)	Miguel Marques (Portugal)	Maksyn Gayda (Ukraine); Yory Bulat (Belarus)
Light Middleweight -71 kg	Dmitry Shakuta (Belarus)	Leonid Lyebyedyev (Ukraine)	Christian Daghio (Italy); Khalid Hanine (Morocco)
Middleweight -75 kg	Vitali Akhramenko (Belarus)	Magomed Kamilov (Russia)	Francisco Fujaco (Portugal); Milovan Gasic (Serbia and Montenegro)
Light Heavyweight -81 kg	Ahmed Maskom (Morocco)	Maksym Neledva (Ukraine)	Ivan Tolkachev (Belarus); Yannick Kahyaoglu (Turkey)
Cruiserweight -86 kg	Andrei Zelenevsky (Belarus)	Towidi Mohamadaga (Iran)	No bronze medallists recorded
Heavyweight -91 kg	Sergiy Arknipov (Ukraine)	Basir Demir (Turkey)	No bronze medallists recorded
Super Heavyweight +91 kg	Sergey Morozov (Russia)	Rafi Omrad (Israel)	Oskar Kohmanov (Uzbekistan); Rachid Ouzagour (Morocco)

== Light-Contact ==
Light-Contact is a form of kickboxing that is less physical than Full-Contact but more so than Semi-Contact and is often seen as a transition between the two. Contestants score points on the basis of speed and technique over brute force although stoppages can occur, although as with other amateur forms head and body protection must be worn - more detail on Light-Contact rules can be found on the official W.A.K.O. website. The men had nine weight divisions ranging from 57 kg/125.4 lbs to over 94 kg/+206.8 lbs, with several new weight divisions at the top end of the scale, while the women had five ranging from 50 kg/110 lbs to over 65 kg/143 lbs. Not exactly full of recognizable names, the most notable winners in this category were Klaus Wilkinson and Boris Zalyotkin in the men's both having won gold at the last European championships, and in the women's, Rita Pesuth who won her second gold medal at Caorle, having also won in Semi-Contact. Poland were the top nation in Light-Contact winning three gold, three silver and four bronze medals.

=== Men's Light-Contact Kickboxing Medals Table ===
Event	Gold	Silver	Bronze
-57 kg	Dezső Debreczeni (Hungary)	Rafal Kaluzny (Poland)	Danijel Mrkoci (Croatia); Erdinc Albayoglu (Germany)
-63 kg	Dawid Kowalski (Poland)	Jorge Coelho (Germany)	Rouslan Agloulline (Poland); Amjane Abaelaziz (Morocco)
-69 kg	Alexandr Maslov (Russia)	Eirik Gundersen (Norway)	Andreas Hahn (Germany); Ramadani Besnik (Switzerland)
-74 kg	Boris Zalyotkin (Russia)	Rafal Petertil (Poland)	Matt Perrins (Canada); Mirko Greppo (Italy)
-79 kg	Alexandr Dmitzienko (Russia)	Zoltan Dancso (Hungary)	Chris McBride (United States); Dirk Lewandowski (Germany)
-84 kg	Martin Albers (Germany)	Mirko Borkovic (Croatia)	Marek Marszal (Poland); Laszlo Toth (Hungary)
-89 kg	Klaus Wilkinson (United Kingdom)	William Eaves (United States)	Rjobert Budnicki (Poland); Marco Tagliaferri (Italy)
-94 kg	Michal Wszelak (Poland)	Christian Andreoletti (Italy)	Andrej Rybaltchenko (Russia); Toni Turk (Slovenia)
+94 kg	Wojciech Szczerbiński (Poland)	Gianmario Franchina (Italy)	Stefan Oscarsson (Sweden); Alexander Major (United States)

=== Women's Light-Contact Kickboxing Medals Table ===
Event	Gold	Silver	Bronze
-50 kg	Diana Szkagyi (Hungary)	Julia Tzotimova (Russia)	Manuela Fugazza (Italy); Julita Tkaczyk (Poland)
-55 kg	Rita Pesuth (Hungary)	Marzia Davide (Italy)	Tetyana Mymrykova (Ukraine); Rada Matsonen (Russia)
-60 kg	Barbara Plazzoli (Italy)	Sanja Stunja (Croatia)	Rajsima Nuzislamova (Russia); Maike Golzenleuchter (Germany)
-65 kg	Helene Horlaville (France)	Annamaria Sisonna (Italy)	Katarina Zuvic (Croatia); Julia Grassini (United States)
+65 kg	Sallie McArdle (Republic of Ireland)	Karolina Lukasik (Poland)	Anja Renfordt (Germany); Stamena Milicevici (Serbia and Montenegro)

== Semi-Contact ==
Semi-Contact is a form of kickboxing in which fights were won by points given due to technique, skill and speed, with physical force limited and as with other forms of amateur kickboxing, head and body protection is worn - more information on Semi-Contact can be found on the W.A.K.O. website. The men had eight weight divisions ranging from 57 kg/125.4 lbs to over 94 kg/+206.8 lbs while the women had five ranging from 50 kg/110 lbs to over 65 kg/143 lbs. The most notable winner was Rita Pesuth who also won gold at the same event in Light-Contact making her a double winner. Italy was the top country in the style, winning six golds and four bronzes.

=== Men's Semi-Contact Kickboxing Medals Table ===
-79 kg Roland Conar (Croatia) Preston Clemens (USA)

Event	Gold	Silver	Bronze
-57 kg	Gianpaolo Calajò (Italy)	Rafal Kaluzny (Poland)	Danijel Mrkoci (Croatia); Hachgen Muchusekov (Russia)
-63 kg	Andrea Misiani (Italy)	Hasan Cataltas (Turkey)	Davorin Gabrovel (Slovenia); Adilson Babtista (United States)
-69 kg	Jason Facey (United States)	Artur Cholewa (Norway)	Ilija Salerno (Republic of Ireland); Thomas Pfaffl (Germany)
-74 kg	Corey Cain (United Kingdom)	Nikos Memos (Greece)	Hudoba Tamas (Hungary); Ralph Hafner (Germany)
-84 kg	Mike Pombiero (United States)	Laszlo Toth (Hungary)	Emanuele Bozzolani (Italy); Ozcan Arslan (Turkey)
-89 kg	Chris McBride (United States)	Clifton Finaley (United Kingdom)	Roberto Montuoro (Italy); Robert Devane (Republic of Ireland)
-94 kg	Marcello Tomasini (Italy)	Dean Furestenberg (United States)	Michael Steier (Germany); Bernard Paqoet (Canada)
+94 kg	Marco Culiersi (Italy)	Mesut Celik (Turkey)	Emmanuel St-Louis (Canada); Rudiger Miller (Germany)

=== Women's Semi-Contact Kickboxing Medals Table ===
Event	Gold	Silver	Bronze
-50 kg	Samantha Aquilano (Italy)	Amanda Quansah (United Kingdom)	Sabine Seifert (Germany); Julia Tzotimova (Russia)
-55 kg	Rita Pesuth (Hungary)	Gonca Thurm (Germany)	Angela Caldera (United States); Tiziana Boscolo (Italy)
-60 kg	Luisa Lico (Italy)	Agnes Tapai (Hungary)	Carla Ribeiro (Brazil); Melanie Moder (Germany)
-65 kg	Kierston Shelby (United States)	Anita Madsen (Norway)	Patrizia Berlingeri (Switzerland); Elaine Fowler (Canada)
+65 kg	Nicola Corbett (Republic of Ireland)	Nadja Sibila (Slovenia)	Oksana Kinach (Ukraine); Elisabetta Degani (Italy)

== Musical Forms ==
Musical Forms is a non-physical competition which sees the contestants fighting against imaginary foes using Martial Arts techniques - more information on the style can be found on the W.A.K.O. website. The men and women competed in four different styles explained below:

- Hard Styles – coming from Karate and Taekwondo.
- Soft Styles – coming from Kung Fu and Wu-Sha.
- Hard Styles with Weapons – using weapons such as Kama, Sai, Tonfa, Nunchaku, Bō, Katana.
- Soft Styles with Weapons - using weapons such as Naginata, Nunchaku, Tai Chi Chuan Sword, Whip Chain.

The most notable winners were Olga Valentinova who was a double winner in Musical Forms and Alexei Pekarchik who also won gold in Thai-boxing. By the end of the championships United States were the top nation with four golds, one silver and two bronze medals.

=== Men's Musical Forms Medals Table ===
Event	Gold	Silver	Bronze
Hard Styles	Jon Valera (United States)	Christian Brell (Germany)	Christophe Carrio (France)
Soft Styles	Anthony De Marco (United States)	Paulo Santana (Portugal)	Alexei Pekarchik (Belarus); Artur Frelke (Germany)
Hard Styles with Weapons	Jon Valera (United States)	Christian Brell (Germany)	Christophe Carrio (France)
Soft Styles with Weapons	Georgy Filimonov (Russia)	Anthony De Marco (United States)	Artur Frelke (Germany); Alexei Pekarchik (Belarus)

=== Women's Musical Forms Medals Table ===
Event	Gold	Silver	Bronze
Hard Styles	Karyne Belanger (Canada)	Sandra Hess (Germany)	Stephanie Flowers (United States)
Soft Styles	Olga Valentinova (Belarus)	Sorokina Svetlana (Russia)	Angie Caldera (United States)
Hard Styles with Weapons	Casey Marks (United States)	Sandra Hess (Germany)	Mahoro Drija (Belarus)
Soft Styles with Weapons	Olga Valentinova (Belarus)	Valeria Smirnova (Russia)	Ewa Sliwa (Poland)

== Overall Medals Standing (Top 5) ==
Ranking	Country	Gold (gold)	Silver (silver)	Bronze (bronze)
1	Belarus	11	2	4
2	Russia	10	8	8
3	Italy	7	4	10
4	United States	7	3	9
5	Poland	4	5	7

== See also ==
- List of WAKO Amateur World Championships
- List of WAKO Amateur European Championships
