= Men's Thai-Boxing at W.A.K.O. European Championships 2006 Skopje -57 kg =

| Men's Thai-Boxing at the W.A.K.O. European Championships 2006 (Skopje) |
|---|
| -51 kg |
| -54 kg |
| -57 kg |
| -60 kg |
| -63.5 kg |
| -67 kg |
| -71 kg |
| -75 kg |
| -81 kg |
| -86 kg |
| -91 kg |
| +91 kg |

The men's featherweight (57 kg/125.4 lbs) Thai-Boxing division at the W.A.K.O. European Championships 2006 in Skopje was the third lightest of the male Thai-Boxing tournaments and involved only four fighters. Each of the matches was three rounds of two minutes each and were fought under Thai-Boxing rules.

The tournament was won by Serbian Aleksandar Gogic who defeated Ruben Almedia from Portugal in the final by split decision to claim gold. Defeated semi finalists Ramil Novruzov from Belarus and Ilya Mordvinov from Russia took the bronze medal positions.

== Results ==
| Semi Finals | | Final |
| (Belarus) Ramil Novruzov |
| (Serbia) Aleksandar Gogic | WIN | (Serbia) Aleksandar Gogic | D(2:1) |
| (Portugal) Ruben Almeida | WIN | (Portugal) Ruben Almeida |
| (Russia) Ilya Mordvinov |

=== Key ===
| Abbreviation | Meaning |
|---|---|
| D (2:1) | Decision (Winners Score:Losers Score) |
| WIN | Victory - official record unclear |

== See also ==
- List of WAKO Amateur European Championships
- List of WAKO Amateur World Championships
- List of male kickboxers
