= Men's Thai-Boxing at W.A.K.O. European Championships 2006 Skopje -63.5 kg =

Men's Thai-Boxing at the W.A.K.O. European Championships 2006 (Skopje)
-51 kg
-54 kg
-57 kg
-60 kg
-63.5 kg
-67 kg
-71 kg
-75 kg
-81 kg
-86 kg
-91 kg
+91 kg

The men's light welterweight (63 kg/138.6 lbs) Thai-Boxing division at the W.A.K.O. European Championships 2006 in Skopje was the fifth lightest of the male Thai-Boxing tournaments involving eight fighters. Each of the matches was three rounds of two minutes each and were fought under Thai-Boxing rules.

The tournament gold medal was won by Yury Zhvokovski from Belarus who defeated Russian Sergey Solomennokov in the final by split decision. Defeated semi finalists Stanislav Ushakov and Michele Iezzi from Russia and Italy respectively had to make do with bronze medals.

== Results ==
Quarter Finals
(Austria) Roman Durlacher
(Russia) Stanislav Ushakov	D(3:0)
(Belarus) Yury Zhvokovski	D(2:1)
(Portugal) Nuno Neves
(Russia) Sergey Solomennokov	AB
(Austria) Schletterer Samoth
(France) Charles Alexandre
(Italy) Michele Iezzi	TKO

Semi Finals
(Russia) Stanislav Ushakov
(Belarus) Yury Zhvokovski	WIN
(Russia) Sergey Solomennokov	WIN
(Italy) Michele Iezzi

Final
(Belarus) Yury Zhvokovski	D(3:0)
(Russia) Sergey Solomennokov

=== Key ===
Abbreviation	Meaning
D (2:1)	Decision (Winners Score:Losers Score)
TKO	Technical Knockout
AB	Abandonment (Injury in match)
WIN	Victory - official source unclear

== See also ==
- List of WAKO Amateur European Championships
- List of WAKO Amateur World Championships
- List of male kickboxers
