= Men's Thai-Boxing at W.A.K.O. European Championships 2006 Skopje -86 kg =

Men's Thai-Boxing at the W.A.K.O. European Championships 2006 (Skopje)
-51 kg
-54 kg
-57 kg
-60 kg
-63.5 kg
-67 kg
-71 kg
-75 kg
-81 kg
-86 kg
-91 kg
+91 kg

The men's cruiserweight (86 kg/189.2 lbs) Thai-Boxing division at the W.A.K.O. European Championships 2006 in Skopje was the third heaviest of the male Thai-Boxing tournaments and involved ten fighters. Each of the matches was three rounds of two minutes each and were fought under Thai-Boxing rules.

Due to the fact there were not enough men for a tournament of sixteen, seven of the men had a bye into the quarter-finals. Maxim Vinogradov of Russia was the tournament champion winning gold by defeating Austrian Aly Staubmann by unanimous decision in the final. Siarhei Krauchanka from Belarus and Zaur Alekporov from Azerbaijan claimed bronze medals.

== Results ==
1st round
(Bosnia and Herzegovina) Murat Raković
(Slovakia) Zsolt Tóth	D(3:0)
(North Macedonia) Jasmin Osmanspahic
(Israel) Avi Ben Mucha	D(2:1)

Quarter-finals
(Bulgaria) Slavi Slovov
(Russia) Maxim Vinogradov	AB
(Azerbaijan) Zaur Alekporov	D(3:0)
(Slovakia) Zsolt Tóth
(Croatia) Marin Roso
(Belarus) Siarhei Krauchanka	WO
(Austria) Aly Staubmann	KO
(Israel) Avi Ben Mucha

Semi-finals
(Russia) Maxim Vinogradov	WIN
(Azerbaijan) Zaur Alekporov
(Belarus) Siarhei Krauchanka
(Austria) Aly Staubmann	WIN

Final
(Russia) Maxim Vinogradov	D(3:0)
(Austria) Aly Staubmann

=== Key ===
Abbreviation	Meaning
D (2:1)	Decision (Winners Score:Losers Score)
KO	Knockout
TKO	Technical Knockout
AB	Abandonment (Injury in match)
WO	Walkover (No fight)
DQ	Disqualification

== See also ==
- List of WAKO Amateur European Championships
- List of WAKO Amateur World Championships
- List of male kickboxers
