= Men's Thai-Boxing at W.A.K.O. European Championships 2006 Skopje -91 kg =

Men's Thai-Boxing at the W.A.K.O. European Championships 2006 (Skopje)
-51 kg
-54 kg
-57 kg
-60 kg
-63.5 kg
-67 kg
-71 kg
-75 kg
-81 kg
-86 kg
-91 kg
+91 kg

The men's heavyweight (91 kg/200.2 lbs) Thai-Boxing division at the W.A.K.O. European Championships 2006 in Skopje was the second heaviest of the male Thai-Boxing tournaments involving eight fighters. Each of the matches was three rounds of two minutes each and were fought under Thai-Boxing rules.

The tournament gold medal was won by Bulgaria's Kiril Pendjurov who defeated Atanas Stojkovski of Macedonia in the final to win gold. Alexey Shevtsov from Russia and the Croatian Igor Jurkovic occupied the bronze medal spots.

Yauhen Anhalevich won gold at Budva out in quarter finals

== Results ==
Quarter Finals
(Russia) Alexey Shevtsov	KO
(North Macedonia) Andrej Georgiev
(Bulgaria) Kiril Pendjurov	D(2:1)
(Belarus) Yauhen Anhalevich
(Hungary) Jánosi László
(North Macedonia) Atanas Stojkovski	D(2:1)
(Bosnia and Herzegovina) Dalibor Krsic
(Croatia) Igor Jurkovic	KO

Semi Finals
(Russia) Alexey Shevtsov
(Bulgaria) Kiril Pendjurov	WIN
(North Macedonia) Atanas Stojkovski	WO
(Croatia) Igor Jurković

Final
(Bulgaria) Kiril Pendjurov	WIN
(North Macedonia) Atanas Stojkovski

=== Key ===
Abbreviation	Meaning
D (2:1)	Decision (Winners Score:Losers Score)
KO	Knockout
TKO	Technical Knockout
AB	Abandonment (Injury in match)
WO	Walkover (No fight)
DQ	Disqualification

== See also ==
- List of WAKO Amateur European Championships
- List of WAKO Amateur World Championships
- List of male kickboxers
