= Men's Thai-Boxing at W.A.K.O. European Championships 2006 Skopje +91 kg =

Men's Thai-Boxing at the W.A.K.O. European Championships 2006 (Skopje)
-51 kg
-54 kg
-57 kg
-60 kg
-63.5 kg
-67 kg
-71 kg
-75 kg
-81 kg
-86 kg
-91 kg
+91 kg

The men's super heavyweight (+91 kg/200.2 lbs) Thai-Boxing division at the W.A.K.O. European Championships 2006 in Skopje was the heaviest of the male Thai-Boxing tournaments and involved eight fighters. Each of the matches was three rounds of two minutes each and were fought under Thai-Boxing rules.

The tournament champion was Alexey Kudin of Belarus who defeated Croatian Valentino Venturini in the final by KO to win the gold medal. It was a sweet victory for Kudzin who had been runner up at the last European championships in Budva. Defeated semi finalists Mirko Vlahović of Montenegro and Mladen Bozic from Serbia took bronze.

== Results ==
Quarter Finals
(Serbia) Mladen Bozic	D(2:1)
(Hungary) Adam Veres
(Slovenia) Jasmin Becirovic
(Belarus) Alexey Kudin	D(3:0)
(Croatia) Valentino Venturini	KO
(North Macedonia) Saso Ilievski
(Russia) Alexey Muravyev
(Montenegro) Mirko Vlahović	D(3:0)

Semi Finals
(Serbia) Mladen Bozic
(Belarus) Alexey Kudin	WIN
(Croatia) Valentino Venturini	WIN
(Montenegro) Mirko Vlahović

Final
(Belarus) Alexey Kudin	KO
(Croatia) Valentino Venturini

=== Key ===
Abbreviation	Meaning
D (2:1)	Decision (Winners Score:Losers Score)
KO	Knockout
TKO	Technical Knockout
AB	Abandonment (Injury in match)
WO	Walkover (No fight)
DQ	Disqualification

== See also ==
- List of WAKO Amateur European Championships
- List of WAKO Amateur World Championships
- List of male kickboxers
