= Men's Thai-Boxing at W.A.K.O. European Championships 2006 Skopje -81 kg =

Men's Thai-Boxing at the W.A.K.O. European Championships 2006 (Skopje)
-51 kg
-54 kg
-57 kg
-60 kg
-63.5 kg
-67 kg
-71 kg
-75 kg
-81 kg
-86 kg
-91 kg
+91 kg

The men's light heavyweight (81 kg/178.2 lbs) Thai-Boxing division at the W.A.K.O. European Championships 2006 in Skopje was the fourth heaviest of the male Thai-Boxing tournaments involving twelve fighters. Each of the matches was three rounds of two minutes each and were fought under Thai-Boxing rules.

As there were not enough fighters for a tournament of sixteen, four of the men automatically went into the quarter-final stage. The tournament champion was Dzianis Hancharonak of Belarus who won gold by beating Ivan Damianov of Bulgaria in the final by walkover. Dmytro Kirpan of Ukraine and Arpad Forgon of Hungary were awarded bronze medals.

== Results ==
1st round
(Spain) Raul Montañez	TKO
(Russia) Alexander Gubanov
(Bulgaria) Ivan Damianov	D(3:0)
(Austria) Thomas Bencsik
(Italy) Riccardo Ginepri
(Ukraine) Dmytro Kirpan	AB
(Belarus) Dzianis Hancharonak	D(3:0)
(Azerbaijan) Araz Ismayilov

Quarter-finals
(Hungary) Arpad Forgon	D(2:1)
(Spain) Raul Montañez
(North Macedonia) Milan Pehcevski
(Bulgaria) Ivan Damianov	D(3:0)
(Slovenia) Rožle Jazbinšek
(Ukraine) Dmytro Kirpan	D(3:0)
(North Macedonia) Nenad Slavkovski
(Belarus) Dzianis Hancharonak	KO

Semi-finals
(Hungary) Arpad Forgon
(Bulgaria) Ivan Damianov	WIN
(Ukraine) Dmytro Kirpan
(Belarus) Dzianis Hancharonak	WIN

Final
(Bulgaria) Ivan Damianov
(Belarus) Dzianis Hancharonak	WO

=== Key ===
Abbreviation	Meaning
D (2:1)	Decision (Winners Score:Losers Score)
KO	Knockout
TKO	Technical Knockout
AB	Abandonment (Injury in match)
WO	Walkover (No fight)
DQ	Disqualification

== See also ==
- List of WAKO Amateur European Championships
- List of WAKO Amateur World Championships
- List of male kickboxers
