= Men's Semi-Contact at WAKO World Championships 2007 Coimbra -74 kg =

The men's 74 kg (162.8 lbs) Semi-Contact category at the W.A.K.O. World Championships 2007 in Coimbra was the fourth lightest of the male Semi-Contact tournaments being roughly comparable to the middleweight division in Full-Contact's weight classes. There were eighteen fighters from three continents (Europe, North America and Oceania) taking part in the competition. Each of the matches was three rounds of two minutes each and were fought under Semi-Contact rules.

As there were not enough men for a tournament designed for thirty-two, fourteen of the contestants had a bye through to the second round. By the end of the tournament, Ireland's Robbie McMenamy won the gold medal, defeating Nikos Memmos from Greece in the final via points decision. The bronze medal positions were taken by Canada's Jason Brown and Great Britain's Jacey Cashman.

== Results ==
1st Round
(United States) Jesse Goldberg | 10
(Slovenia) Andrej Vindiš | 16
(New Zealand) Steve McCone | 1
(Austria) Ivan Kulev | 11

2nd Round
(Republic of Ireland) Robbie McMenamy | 20
(Italy) Domenico De Marco | 12
(Portugal) Dinis Pereira | 6
(Czech Republic) Tomas Karel | 12
(Norway) Morten Spissoy | 13
(Poland) Krisztian Jaroszk | 12
(Canada) Jason Brown | 12
(Slovenia) Andrej Vindiš | 11
(Germany) Arben Ftac | 14
(Turkey) Ugur Guven | 10
(Greece) Nikos Memmos | 10
(Austria) Ivan Kulev | 0
(Denmark) Thorkild Sandstrap | 14
(Russia) Mikhail Gerasimov | 20
(Switzerland) Dimitri Gaulis | 11
(United Kingdom) Jacey Cashman | 21

Quarter Finals
(Republic of Ireland) Robbie McMenamy | 12
(Czech Republic) Tomas Karel | 2
(Norway) Morten Spissoy | 16
(Canada) Jason Brown | 23
(Germany) Arben Ftac | 15
(Greece) Nikos Memmos | 20
(Russia) Mikhail Gerasimov | 15
(United Kingdom) Jacey Cashman | 17

Semi Finals
(Republic of Ireland) Robbie McMenamy | 15
(Canada) Jason Brown | 11
(Greece) Nikos Memmos | 12
(United Kingdom) Jacey Cashman | 9

Final
(Republic of Ireland) Robbie McMenamy | ?
(Greece) Nikos Memmos | ?

=== Key ===
| Abbreviation | Meaning |
|---|---|
| D (3:0) | Decision (Unanimous) |
| D (2:1) | Decision (Split) |
| KO | Knockout |
| TKO | Technical Knockout |
| AB | Abandonment (Injury in match) |
| WO | Walkover (No fight) |
| DQ | Disqualification |

== See also ==
- List of WAKO Amateur World Championships
- List of WAKO Amateur European Championships
- List of male kickboxers
