= Men's Semi-Contact at WAKO World Championships 2007 Coimbra -57 kg =

The men's 57 kg (125.4 lbs) Semi-Contact category at the W.A.K.O. World Championships 2007 in Coimbra was the lightest of the male Semi-Contact tournaments being the equivalent of the featherweight division when compared to Full-Contact's weight classes. There were eleven men from two continents (Europe and Asia) taking part in the competition. Each of the matches was three rounds of two minutes each and were fought under Semi-Contact rules.

As there were too few fighters for a sixteen-man tournament, five of the contestants had byes through to the quarter finals. The tournament winner was Canada's Robbie Lavoie who defeated Poland's Piotr Bąkowski in the final on points to claim gold. The two Light-Contact finalists from the earlier Belgrade event, silver medal winner Maxim Aysin from Russia and champion Dezső Debreczeni from Hungary, had to make do with bronze medal finishes.

== Results ==
These matches were decided on points.

1st Round
(Republic of Ireland) Jason Doyle	19
(Turkey) Serkan Sarikaya	9
(Italy) Davide Nucci	10
(India) Sushil Kumar Butadaw	0
(United Kingdom) Darren Chapman	11
(United States) Robert Andreozzi	0

Quarter Finals
(Russia) Maxim Aysin	11
(Slovenia) Dusan Lamut	1
(Republic of Ireland) Jason Doyle	12
(Poland) Piotr Bąkowski	18
(Canada) Robbie Lavoie	10
(Italy) Davide Nucci	0
(United Kingdom) Darren Chapman	7
(Hungary) Dezső Debreczeni	11

Semi Finals
(Russia) Maxim Aysin	16
(Poland) Piotr Bąkowski	20
(Canada) Robbie Lavoie	18
(Hungary) Dezső Debreczeni	14

Final
(Poland) Piotr Bąkowski	9
(Canada) Robbie Lavoie	12

== See also ==
- List of WAKO Amateur World Championships
- List of WAKO Amateur European Championships
- List of male kickboxers
