= Men's semi-contact at WAKO World Championships 2007 Coimbra -84 kg =

The men's 84 kg (184.8 lbs) semi-contact category at the W.A.K.O. World Championships 2007 in Coimbra was the fourth-heaviest of the male semi-contact tournaments falling between the light heavyweight and cruiserweight division when compared to the full-contact weight classes. There were eighteen fighters from four continents (Europe, North America, South America and Oceania) taking part in the competition. Each of the matches was three rounds of two minutes each and were fought under semi-contact rules.

Due to the less than required numbers for a thirty-two-man event, fourteen of the fighters had a bye through to the second round. The tournament winner was the Canadian Jason Grenier who won gold by defeating the Greek Andreas Aggelopoulos in the final match. Germany's Robert Knoedlseder and Croatian Zvonimir Gribl won bronze medals for reaching the semi-finals.

== Results ==
1st round
(Denmark) David Rasmussen
(Slovenia) Primoe Bracic	D(12:9)
(Portugal) Marco Afonso
(Brazil) Altaceste Baptista	(11:1)

2nd round
(Germany) Robert Knoedlseder	D(17:7)
(Switzerland) Christophe Leuba
(New Zealand) Nicholas Feisst
(Hungary) Zoltan Dancso	D(10:0)
(Republic of Ireland) Stephen O'Connor
(United Kingdom) Drew Neal	D(19:15)
(Canada) Jason Grenier	D(9:5)
(Slovenia) Primoe Bracic
(Norway) Gjermund Nesland
(Greece) Andreas Aggelopoulos	D(20:18)
(United States) El-Java Abdul-Qadir	D(15:5)
(Brazil) Altaceste Baptista
(Turkey) Murat Sirekbasan
(Italy) Giuseppe De Marco	D(19:9)
(Austria) Andreas Daxer
(Croatia) Zvonimir Gribl	D(12:2)

Quarter-finals
(Germany) Robert Knoedlseder	D(21:17)
(Hungary) Zoltan Dancso
(United Kingdom) Drew Neal
(Canada) Jason Grenier	D(23:18)
(Greece) Andreas Aggelopoulos	D(22:14)
(United States) El-Java Abdul-Qadir
(Italy) Giuseppe De Marco
(Croatia) Zvonimir Gribl	D(14:11)

Semi-finals
(Germany) Robert Knoedlseder
(Canada) Jason Grenier	D(16:10)
(Greece) Andreas Aggelopoulos	D(12:11)
(Croatia) Zvonimir Gribl

Final
(Canada) Jason Grenier	D(?:?)
(Greece) Andreas Aggelopoulos

=== Key ===
Abbreviation	Meaning
D (3:0)	Decision (Unanimous)
D (2:1)	Decision (Split)
KO	Knockout
TKO	Technical Knockout
AB	Abandonment (Injury in match)
WO	Walkover (No fight)
DQ	Disqualification

== See also ==
- List of WAKO Amateur World Championships
- List of WAKO Amateur European Championships
- List of male kickboxers
