= Men's Semi-Contact at WAKO World Championships 2007 Coimbra -79 kg =

The men's 79 kg (174 lb) Semi-Contact category at the W.A.K.O. World Championships 2007 in Coimbra was the fifth-heaviest of the male Semi-Contact tournaments falling between middleweight and light heavyweight when compared to Full-Contact's weight classes. There were sixteen fighters from four continents (Europe, Asia, North America and Oceania) taking part in the competition. Each of the matches was three rounds of two minutes each and were fought under Semi-Contact rules.

The tournament gold medallist was the Hungarian Zsolt Moradi who defeated Neri Stella from Italy by points decision in the final. As a result of their semi final finishes, Ireland's Mark McDermott and Bulgarian Mitko Kostadinov won bronze medals.

== Results ==
1st Round
(Hungary) Zsolt Moradi	D(11:1)
(United Kingdom) Andrew Cleeves
(Germany) Tobias Weiss	D(10:4)
(Canada) Eric Dubois
(Republic of Ireland) Mark McDermott	D(23:13)
(Denmark) Jonas Jacobsen
(Poland) Wojciech Ołtarzewski
(United States) Alexander Lane	D(15:11)
(Slovenia) Jure Vetrsek	D(16:6)
(Portugal) Hugo Matos
(New Zealand) Clint King
(Bulgaria) Mitko Kostadinov	D(10:0)
(India) Bappu Ghule
(Turkey) Guentay Kantarkiran	D(11:1)
(Austria) Patrick Moosburger
(Italy) Neri Stella	TKO

Quarter Finals
(Hungary) Zsolt Moradi	D(9:7)
(Germany) Tobias Weiss
(Republic of Ireland) Mark McDermott	D(23:20)
(United States) Alexander Lane
(Slovenia) Jure Vetrsek
(Bulgaria) Mitko Kostadinov	D(15:12)
(Turkey) Guentay Kantarkiran
(Italy) Neri Stella	14:3

Semi Finals
(Hungary) Zsolt Moradi	D(17:7)
(Republic of Ireland) Mark McDermott
(Bulgaria) Mitko Kostadinov
(Italy) Neri Stella	D(11:1)

Final
(Hungary) Zsolt Moradi	D(13:8)
(Italy) Neri Stella

=== Key ===
Abbreviation	Meaning
D (3:0)	Decision (Unanimous)
D (2:1)	Decision (Split)
KO	Knockout
TKO	Technical Knockout
AB	Abandonment (Injury in match)
WO	Walkover (No fight)
DQ	Disqualification

== See also ==
- List of WAKO Amateur World Championships
- List of WAKO Amateur European Championships
- List of male kickboxers
