= W.A.K.O. World Championships 2007 =

W.A.K.O. World Championships 2007 may refer to:

- W.A.K.O. World Championships 2007 (Belgrade)
- W.A.K.O. World Championships 2007 (Coimbra)
