= Women's Semi-Contact at WAKO World Championships 2007 Coimbra -65 kg =

2007 female kickboxing event

The women's 65 kg (143 lbs) Semi-Contact category at the W.A.K.O. World Championships 2007 in Coimbra was the third heaviest of the female Light-Contact tournaments being the equivalent of the light heavyweight division when compared to Full-Contact's weight classes. There were twelve women from three continents (Europe, Africa and North America) taking part in the competition. Each of the matches was three rounds of two minutes each and were fought under Semi-Contact rules.

Due to there not being enough fighters for a tournament designed for sixteen, four of the women had byes through to the quarter-final stage. The tournament winner was Germany's Melanie Moder who defeated Italy's Chiara Leonardi in the final by points decision to claim gold. Defeated semi finalists, Ina Grindheim from Norway and Lorraine Hughes from Great Britain, claimed the bronze medal positions.

== Results ==
1st round
(Canada) Michelle Antolic	12
(Belgium) Vicky Praet	16
(United States) Nicole Pelland	14
(South Africa) Michelle Welvering	4
(Turkey) Nazire Çobankaya	2
(Hungary) Bojana Dancsecs	12
(Germany) Melanie Moder	16
(Poland) Krystyna Szytenchelm	9

Quarter-finals
(Italy) Chiara Leonardi	9
(Belgium) Vicky Praet	5
(United Kingdom) Ina Grindheim	14
(United States) Nicole Pelland	9
(United Kingdom) Lorraine Hughes	16
(United States) Bojana Dancsecs	15
(Germany) Melanie Moder	17
(Switzerland) Patrizia Berlingieri	13

Semi-finals
(Italy) Chiara Leonardi	7
(Norway) Ina Grindheim	6
(United Kingdom) Lorraine Hughes	2
(Germany) Melanie Moder	12

Final
(Italy) Chiara Leonardi	7
(Germany) Melanie Moder	12

=== Key ===
Abbreviation	Meaning
D (3:0)	Decision (Unanimous)
D (2:1)	Decision (Split)
KO	Knockout
TKO	Technical Knockout
AB	Abandonment (Injury in match)
WO	Walkover (No fight)
DQ	Disqualification

== See also ==
- List of WAKO Amateur World Championships
- List of WAKO Amateur European Championships
- List of female kickboxers
