= Women's Semi-Contact at WAKO World Championships 2007 Coimbra -50 kg =

The women's 50 kg (110 lbs) Semi-Contact category at the W.A.K.O. World Championships 2007 in Coimbra was the lightest of the female Light-Contact tournaments falling between bantamweight and featherweight when compared to Full-Contact's weight classes. There were thirteen women from two continents (Europe and North America) taking part in the competition. Each of the matches was three rounds of two minutes each and were fought under Semi-Contact rules.

As there were too few women for a tournament designed for sixteen, three of the fighters had byes through to the quarter finals. The tournament gold medalist was Hungary's Reka Krempf who beat Great Britain's Sharon Gill in the final on points. Defeated semi-finalists Eugenia Kaskantiri from Greece and Fadeeva Svetlana from Russia took bronze.

== Results ==
1st Round
(Canada) Sarah-Kim Gagnon	17
(Italy) Valentina Barbieri	11
(Slovenia) Sabina Kolednik	19
(Belgium) Nanouch van Gijsel	20
(Republic of Ireland) Sinead Beasley	7
(Switzerland) Dana Rueger	10
(United Kingdom) Sharon Gill	12
(United States) Ashley Lima	2
(Turkey) Hamiyet Seyma Caglayan	25
(Austria) Kathrin Foidl	15

Quarter Finals
(Hungary) Reka Krempf	6
(Canada) Sarah-Kim Gagnon	3
(Greece) Eugenia Kaskantiri	17
(Belgium) Nanouch van Gijsel	7
(Switzerland) Dana Rueger	8
(United Kingdom) Sharon Gill	18
(Turkey) Hamiyet Seyma Caglayan	4
(Russia) Fadeeva Svetlana	14

Semi Finals
(Hungary) Reka Krempf	10
(Greece) Eugenia Kaskantiri	9
(United Kingdom) Sharon Gill	18
(Russia) Fadeeva Svetlana	10

Final
(Hungary) Reka Krempf	13
(United Kingdom) Sharon Gill	3

=== Key ===
Abbreviation	Meaning
D (3:0)	Decision (Unanimous)
D (2:1)	Decision (Split)
KO	Knockout
TKO	Technical Knockout
AB	Abandonment (Injury in match)
WO	Walkover (No fight)
DQ	Disqualification

== See also ==
- List of WAKO Amateur World Championships
- List of WAKO Amateur European Championships
- List of female kickboxers
