= Women's Semi-Contact at WAKO World Championships 2007 Coimbra +70 kg =

The women's Over 70 kg (+154 lbs) Semi-Contact category at the W.A.K.O. World Championships 2007 in Coimbra was the heaviest of the female Light-Contact tournaments being the equivalent of the super heavyweight division when compared to Full-Contact's weight classes. There were eight women from two continents (Europe and North America) taking part in the competition. Each of the matches was three rounds of two minutes each and were fought under Semi-Contact rules.

The tournament gold medal went to Hungary's Anna Kondar who defeated Ireland's Natalie Cassidy in the final by points decision. Defeated semi finalists Russia's Oxana Kinakh (who had won gold in the Light-Contact category in Belgrade earlier that year) and Great Britain's Rosemarie James won bronze medals for their efforts in reaching the semi-finals.

== Results ==
These matches were decided on points.

Quarter-finals
(Italy) Silvia Maggioni	4
(Hungary) Anna Kondar	14
(United Kingdom) Rosemarie James	13
(Turkey) Ayten Çoban	3
(Republic of Ireland) Natalie Cassidy	9
(Poland) Marika Markiewicz	7
(United States) Sara Homewood	6
(Russia) Oxana Kinakh	16

Semi-finals
(Hungary) Anna Kondar	16
(United Kingdom) Rosemarie James	11
(Republic of Ireland) Natalie Cassidy	15
(Russia) Oxana Kinakh	11

Final
(Hungary) Anna Kondar	11
(Republic of Ireland) Natalie Cassidy	0

== See also ==
- List of WAKO Amateur World Championships
- List of WAKO Amateur European Championships
- List of female kickboxers
