= Men's Full-Contact at WAKO World Championships 2007 Coimbra -75 kg =

The men's middleweight (75 kg/165 lbs) Full-Contact category at the W.A.K.O. World Championships 2007 in Coimbra was the fifth heaviest of the male Full-Contact tournaments and one of the largest, involving twenty-six fighters from six continents (Europe, Asia, Africa, North America, South America and Oceania). Each of the matches was three rounds of two minutes each and were fought under Full-Contact rules.

As there were not enough fighters for a tournament designed for thirty-two, six of the men received a bye through to the second round. The tournament winner was Kazak Azamat Belgibaev who won gold by defeating Russian Manuchari Pipiya by split decision in the final. Francesco Margiotta from Italy and Alpay Kir from Turkey both claimed bronze medals.

== Results ==
1st Round
(Ukraine) Mykola Osobskiy	D(3:0)
(Azerbaijan) Rafiq Aliyev
(Brazil) Marcello Bahia	D(2:1)
(Serbia) Predrag Milenkovic
(Poland) Robert Zietek	D(3:0)
(South Africa) Marcel van der Merwe
(India) Jayadev Mhamane
(France) Frederic Ficet	D(3:0)
(Portugal) Bruno Santos
(Italy) Francesco Margiotta	D(3:0)
(North Macedonia) Ile Risteski	D(3:0)
(United States) William Matthies
(Turkey) Alpay Kir	D(2:1)
(Sweden) Fredrik Ganse
(Canada) Rob Dixon
(Austria) Michael Gerdenitsch	D(3:0)
(Romania) Daniel Lazar
(Switzerland) Franco Caruso	D(2:1)
(Norway) Karl Martin Richardsen
(Slovakia) Pavol Garaj	D(3:0)

2nd Round
(Russia) Manuchari Pipiya
(Ukraine) Mykola Osobskiy
(Bulgaria) Krasimir Apostolov	KO
(Brazil) Marcello Bahia
(Croatia) Bozo Perisic	D(3:0)
(Poland) Robert Zietek
(France) Frederic Ficet
(Italy) Francesco Margiotta	D(3:0)
(New Zealand) Leith Trail
(North Macedonia) Ile Risteski	TKO
(Turkey) Alpay Kir	D(3:0)
(Canada) Michael Gerdenitsch
(Hungary) Zsolt Hornok
(Switzerland) Franco Caruso	D(3:0)
(Slovakia) Pavol Garaj
(Kazakhstan) Azamat Belgibaev	KO

Quarter Finals
(Russia) Manuchari Pipiya	D(3:0)
(Bulgaria) Krasimir Apostolov
(Croatia) Bozo Perisic
(Italy) Francesco Margiotta	D(2:1)
(North Macedonia) Ile Risteski
(Turkey) Alpay Kir	TKO
(Switzerland) Franco Caruso
(Kazakhstan) Azamat Belgibaev	AB

Semi Finals
(Russia) Manuchari Pipiya	D(2:1)
(Italy) Francesco Margiotta
(Turkey) Alpay Kir
(Kazakhstan) Azamat Belgibaev	D(3:0)

Final
(Russia) Manuchari Pipiya
(Kazakhstan) Azamat Belgibaev	D(2:1)

=== Key ===
Abbreviation	Meaning
D (3:0)	Decision (Unanimous)
D (2:1)	Decision (Split)
KO	Knockout
TKO	Technical Knockout
AB	Abandonment (Injury in match)
WO	Walkover (No fight)
DQ	Disqualification

== See also ==
- List of WAKO Amateur World Championships
- List of WAKO Amateur European Championships
- List of male kickboxers
