= Men's Semi-Contact at WAKO World Championships 2007 Coimbra +94 kg =

The men's Over 94 kg (+206.8 lbs) Semi-Contact category at the W.A.K.O. World Championships 2007 in Coimbra was the heaviest of the male Semi-Contact tournaments with super heavyweight being the nearest equivalent when compared to Full-Contact's weight classes. There were thirteen fighters from three continents (Europe, Africa and North America) taking part in the competition. Each of the matches was three rounds of two minutes each and were fought under Semi-Contact rules.

Due to the fact there were too few men for a tournament intended for sixteen, three of the fighters received byes through to the quarter-final stage. The tournament winner was Italy's Marco Culiersi who defeated Ireland's Andy Hogan by points decision in the final to claim gold. Belgrade '07 Light-Contact bronze medalist Ranis Smajlovic from Slovenia won another bronze medal as did Lee Matthews from Great Britain.

== Results ==
1st round
(Greece) Giannis Mihalos	14
(United Kingdom) Lee Matthews	19
(Turkey) Mehmet Ali Acar	10
(Croatia) Mario Samirić	15
(South Africa) Chris de Nysschen	14
(United States) Stephen Kempf	17
(Slovenia) Ranis Smajlovic	16
(Hungary) Tamás Kecskés	6
(Russia) Ivan Bebik	4
(Republic of Ireland) Andy Hogan	14

Quarter-finals
(Germany) Daniel Haendel	20
(United Kingdom) Lee Matthews	21
(Croatia) Mario Samirić	15
(Italy) Marco Culiersi	19
(United States) Stephen Kempf	5
(Slovenia) Ranis Smajlovic	16
(Republic of Ireland) Andy Hogan	23
(Canada) Benjamin Stewart	16

Semi-finals
(United Kingdom) Lee Matthews	16
(Italy) Marco Culiersi	17
(Slovenia) Ranis Smajlovic	11
(Republic of Ireland) Andy Hogan	15

Final
(Italy) Marco Culiersi	15
(Republic of Ireland) Andy Hogan	10

=== Key ===
Abbreviation	Meaning
D (3:0)	Decision (Unanimous)
D (2:1)	Decision (Split)
KO	Knockout
TKO	Technical Knockout
AB	Abandonment (Injury in match)
WO	Walkover (No fight)
DQ	Disqualification

== See also ==
- List of WAKO Amateur World Championships
- List of WAKO Amateur European Championships
- List of male kickboxers
