= Women's Semi-Contact at WAKO World Championships 2007 Coimbra -60 kg =

The women's 60 kg (132 lbs) Semi-Contact category at the W.A.K.O. World Championships 2007 in Coimbra was the third lightest of the female Light-Contact tournaments being the equivalent of the middleweight division when compared to Full-Contact's weight classes. There were fifteen women from three continents (Europe, Africa and North America) taking part in the competition. Each of the matches was three rounds of two minutes each and were fought under Semi-Contact rules.

As there were too few women for a sixteen-person tournament, one of the women had a bye through to the quarter-final stage. The tournament gold medallist was the Italian Gloria De Bei who defeated Brit Lisa Boardman in the final by points decision. Pole Emilia Szablowska and 2007 Belgrade Light-Contact gold medallist Klara Morton from Hungary took bronze.

== Results ==
1st round
(Hungary) Klara Marton	11
(South Africa) Megan Brink	0
(Turkey) Kiraz Sahin	22
(Austria) Christin Fiedler	17
(United Kingdom) Lisa Broadman	15
(Russia) Ksenia Guralnik	5
(Norway) Ida Abrahamsen	13
(Republic of Ireland) Aine O'Hanlon	9
(Italy) Gloria De Bei	16
(Cyprus) Vasiliki Mitropoulou	6
(Canada) Victoria Marcotte	20
(Slovenia) Svatava Špániková	10
(Greece) Myriam Mpourdala	7
(Poland) Emilia Szablowska	13

Quarter-finals
(Hungary) Klara Marton	7
(Turkey) Kiraz Sahin	4
(United Kingdom) Lisa Broadman	11
(Norway) Ida Abrahamsen	10
(Italy) Gloria De Bei	23
(Canada) Victoria Marcotte	16
(Poland) Emilia Szablowska	9
(Germany) Caroline Pitzke	6

Semi-finals
(Hungary) Klara Marton	16
(United Kingdom) Lisa Broadman	18
(Italy) Gloria De Bei	9
(Poland) Emilia Szablowska	7

Final
(United Kingdom) Lisa Broadman	12
(Italy) Gloria De Bei	17

=== Key ===
Abbreviation	Meaning
D (3:0)	Decision (Unanimous)
D (2:1)	Decision (Split)
KO	Knockout
TKO	Technical Knockout
AB	Abandonment (Injury in match)
WO	Walkover (No fight)
DQ	Disqualification

== See also ==
- List of WAKO Amateur World Championships
- List of WAKO Amateur European Championships
- List of female kickboxers
