= Men's Semi-Contact at WAKO World Championships 2007 Coimbra -63 kg =

The men's 63 kg (138.6 lbs) Semi-Contact category at the W.A.K.O. World Championships 2007 in Coimbra was the second lightest of the male Semi-Contact tournaments being the equivalent of the light welterweight division when compared to Full-Contact's weight classes. There were 20 men from three continents (Europe, Asia, and North America) taking part in the competition. Each of the matches was three rounds of two minutes each and were fought under Semi-Contact rules.

As there were not enough men for a tournament designed for 32, 12 of the fighters received byes through to the second round. The tournament gold medal was won by Italy's Andrea Lucchese who defeated Hungary's Viktor Hirsch in the final by points decision. Defeated semi-finalists Turkey's Taskin Kahveci and Slovenia's Juvan Klemen won bronze medals.

== Results ==
1st Round
(United Kingdom) Christopher Collymore	10
(Netherlands) Jacobus Wolff	1
(India) Durga Charan Sahoo	1
(Portugal) Emanuel Cortes	11
(Greece) Sotiris Ziogos	14
(Switzerland) Nico Thommen	18
(Austria) Robert Hoegler	4
(Canada) Cédric Martel	9

2nd Round
(Republic of Ireland) Robbie Haugh	5
(Italy) Andrea Lucchese	13
(Bulgaria) Kristian Andonov	13
(United Kingdom) Christopher Collymore	14
(Turkey) Taskin Kahveci	10
(Belgium) Bert Hennissen	8
(Germany) Joachim Weisshardt	26
(Portugal) Emanuel Cortes	25
(Russia) Ruslan Zaynutdinov	8
(Slovenia) Juvan Klemen	16
(Poland) Wojciech Niedzielski	8
(Switzerland) Nico Thommen	14
(United States) Joseph Fife	12
(Canada) Cédric Martel	6
(Kazakhstan) Maxim Gromyko	3
(Hungary) Viktor Hirsch	13

Quarter Finals
(Italy) Andrea Lucchese	16
(United Kingdom) Christopher Collymore	8
(Turkey) Taskin Kahveci	22
(Germany) Joachim Weisshardt	21
(Slovenia) Juvan Klemen	17
(Switzerland) Nico Thommen	10
(United States) Joseph Fife	14
(Hungary) Viktor Hirsch	15

Semi Finals
(Italy) Andrea Lucchese	14
(Turkey) Taskin Kahveci	8
(Slovenia) Juvan Klemen	8
(Hungary) Viktor Hirsch	14

Final
(Italy) Andrea Lucchese	?
(Hungary) Viktor Hirsch	?

=== Key ===
Abbreviation	Meaning
D (3:0)	Decision (Unanimous)
D (2:1)	Decision (Split)
KO	Knockout
TKO	Technical Knockout
AB	Abandonment (Injury in match)
WO	Walkover (No fight)
DQ	Disqualification

== See also ==
- List of WAKO Amateur World Championships
- List of WAKO Amateur European Championships
- List of male kickboxers
