= Men's Full-Contact at WAKO World Championships 2007 Coimbra -51 kg =

The men's light bantamweight (51 kg/112.2 lbs) Full-Contact category at the W.A.K.O. World Championships 2007 in Coimbra was the lightest of the male Full-Contact tournaments, involving eleven fighters from two continents (Europe and Asia). Each of the matches was three rounds of two minutes each and were fought under Full-Contact rules.

Due to there being too few fighters for a sixteen-man tournament, five of the fighters had a bye through to the quarter-final. The tournament winner was the Italian Ivan Sciolla who defeated Azerbaijani Zaur Mammadov by split decision to claim gold in what was a rematch of the Low-Kick final in Belgrade (Mammadov had won the gold that time). The bronze medal positions were taken by Spain's Joaquín Céspedes Salas and Russia's Ivan Bityutskikh.

== Results ==
1st round
(Spain) Carlos Ferreira
(Kazakhstan) Nurzhan Serik	D(2:1)
(Turkey) Çağdaş Yıkılmaz
(Italy) Ivan Sciolla	D(2:1)
(Turkmenistan) Ramin Kasymov	D(2:1)
(Bulgaria) Aleksandar Aleksandrov

Quarter-finals
(Spain) Joaquín Céspedes Salas	KO
(India) N.N. Meitei
(Azerbaijan) Zaur Mammadov	D(3:0)
(Kazakhstan) Nurzhan Serik
(Poland) Wojciech Peryt
(Italy) Ivan Sciolla	D(2:1)
(Turkmenistan) Ramin Kasymov
(Russia) Ivan Bityutskikh	D(3:0)

Semi-finals
(Spain) Joaquín Céspedes Salas
(Azerbaijan) Zaur Mammadov	D(2:1)
(Italy) Ivan Sciolla	D(2:1)
(Russia) Ivan Bityutskikh

Final
(Azerbaijan) Zaur Mammadov
(Italy) Ivan Sciolla	D(2:1)

=== Key ===
Abbreviation	Meaning
D (3:0)	Decision (Unanimous)
D (2:1)	Decision (Split)
KO	Knockout

== See also ==
- List of WAKO Amateur World Championships
- List of WAKO Amateur European Championships
- List of male kickboxers
