= Men's Full-Contact at WAKO World Championships 2007 Coimbra -63.5 kg =

The men's light welterweight (63.5 kg/139.7 lbs) Full-Contact category at the W.A.K.O. World Championships 2007 in Coimbra was the fifth lightest of the male Full-Contact tournaments, involving nineteen fighters from four continents (Europe, Asia, Africa and North America). Each of the matches was three rounds of two minutes each and were fought under Full-Contact rules.

As there were not enough fighters for a thirty-two man tournament, thirteen of the men received byes through to the second round. The tournament gold medallist was Mardan Buzdaev from Kazakhstan who won by walkover against Italian Andrea Scaglione, who could not participate in the final. Brian Dickson from Canada and Tomasz Pietraszewski from Poland were rewarded with bronze medals for reaching the semi-finals.

== Results ==
1st round
(India) G Dijamani Sharma
(Spain) Juan Blanco Merino	D(3:0)
(Peru) Cesar Augusto Sesoko Alva
(Azerbaijan) Anar Lalayev	D(3:0)
(Portugal) Jose Peres
(Bulgaria) Nikola Nikolov	D(3:0)

2nd round
(Sweden) John Johansson
(Kazakhstan) Mardan Buzdaev	D(3:0)
(Spain) Juan Blanco Merino
(Denmark) Ayoub Saidi	D(2:1)
(Austria) Saban Seferovic
(Canada) Brian Dickson	D(3:0)
(Croatia) Matej Benić
(Azerbaijan) Anar Lalayev	D(2:1)
(Turkey) Ali Alkayis
(Poland) Tomasz Pietraszewski	D(2:1)
(Hungary) István Szemok
(Bulgaria) Nikola Nikolov	D(3:0)
(Russia) Denis Lukashov	D(3:0)
(United States) Jonathan Lewis
(Italy) Andrea Scaglione	D(2:1)
(Norway) Arild Mikarlsen

Quarter-finals
(Kazakhstan) Mardan Buzdaev	D(2:1)
(Denmark) Ayoub Saidi
(Canada) Brian Dickson	D(2:1)
(Azerbaijan) Anar Lalayev
(Poland) Tomasz Pietraszewski	D(3:0)
(Bulgaria) Nikola Nikolov
(Russia) Denis Lukashov
(Italy) Andrea Scaglione	D(2:1)

Semi-finals
(Kazakhstan) Mardan Buzdaev	TKO
(Canada) Brian Dickson
(Poland) Tomasz Pietraszewski
(Italy) Andrea Scaglione	D(3:0)

Final
(Kazakhstan) Mardan Buzdaev	WO
(Italy) Andrea Scaglione

=== Key ===
Abbreviation	Meaning
D (3:0)	Decision (Unanimous)
D (2:1)	Decision (Split)
TKO	Technical Knockout
WO	Walkover (No fight)

== See also ==
- List of WAKO Amateur World Championships
- List of WAKO Amateur European Championships
- List of male kickboxers
