= Men's Full-Contact at WAKO World Championships 2007 Coimbra -67 kg =

Kickboxing tournament

The men's welterweight (63.5 kg/147.4 lbs) Full-Contact category at the W.A.K.O. World Championships 2007 in Coimbra was the sixth lightest of the male Full-Contact tournaments, involving nineteen fighters from four continents (Europe, Asia, North America and Oceania). Each of the matches was three rounds of two minutes each and were fought under Full-Contact rules.

As there were not enough fighters for a thirty-two man tournament, thirteen of the men received byes through to the second round. The tournament winner was Vladimir Tarasov from Russia who defeated Kazakhstan's Stepan Avramidi in the final by unanimous decision to win gold. Belgrade '07 Low-Kick semi finalist Ramil Nadirov from Azerbaijan and France's Edmond Mebenga won bronze medals.

== Results ==
1st Round
(Kazakhstan) Stepan Avramidi	D(3:0)
(Germany) Nik Bachinger
(Ukraine) David Agakhanov	D(3:0)
(Canada) Ryan Burgess
(Russia) Vladimir Tarasov	D(3:0)
(Hungary) Zsolt Nagy

2nd Round
(Portugal) João Oliveira
(Azerbaijan) Ramil Nadirov	D(3:0)
(Turkmenistan) Soltanmurad Esenov	D(3:0)
(Croatia) Renato Gogosevic
(Turkey) Bayram Ugur	D(3:0)
(New Zealand) Shaye Brooks
(Austria) Peter Treichel
(Kazakhstan) Stepan Avramidi	D(3:0)
(France) Edmond Mebenga	D(3:0)
(Slovenia) Gregor Stračanek
(Bulgaria) Toma Tomov
(Ukraine) David Agakhanov	D(3:0)
(United States) Aaron Swenson
(Russia) Vladimir Tarasov	TKO
(Italy) Roberto D'Avanzo	D(2:1)
(Finland) Jere Reinikainen

Quarter Finals
Ramil Nadirov	D(3:0)
(Turkmenistan) Soltanmurad Esenov
(Turkey) Bayram Ugur
(Kazakhstan) Stepan Avramidi	D(3:0)
(France) Edmond Mebenga	D(3:0)
(Ukraine) David Agakhanov
(Russia) Vladimir Tarasov	D(2:1)
(Italy) Roberto D'Avanzo

Semi Finals
(Azerbaijan) Ramil Nadirov
(Kazakhstan) Stepan Avramidi	D(2:1)
(France) Edmond Mebenga
(Russia) Vladimir Tarasov	D(2:1)

Final
(Kazakhstan) Stepan Avramidi
(Russia) Vladimir Tarasov	D(3:0)

=== Key ===
Abbreviation	Meaning
D (3:0)	Decision (Unanimous)
D (2:1)	Decision (Split)
TKO	Technical Knockout

== See also ==
- List of WAKO Amateur World Championships
- List of WAKO Amateur European Championships
- List of male kickboxers
