= Men's Full-Contact at WAKO World Championships 2007 Coimbra -54 kg =

The men's bantamweight (54 kg/118.8 lbs) Full-Contact category at the W.A.K.O. World Championships 2007 in Coimbra was the second lightest of the male Full-Contact tournaments, involving just seven fighters from two continents (Europe and Asia). Each of the matches was three rounds of two minutes each and were fought under Full-Contact rules.

As there was one too few men for a tournament designed for eight, one of the fighters had a bye through to the semi-finals. The tournament champion was Kazak Miras Brimzhanov who defeated Sergiy Chezkaskyy from Ukraine in the final by unanimous decision. Defeated semi finalists Turkey's Barış Fidanoğlu (who did not record any wins) and Spain's Raúl Pandiella Gutiérrez won bronze medals.

== Results ==
Quarter-finals
(Russia) Andrey Samozhikov
(Kazakhstan) Sergiy Chezkaskyy	D(2:1)
(Spain) Raúl Pandiella Gutiérrez	DQ
(India) T.H. Valour Singh
(Kazakhstan) Miras Brimzhanov	D(3:0)
(Bulgaria) Yordan Vasilev

Semi-finals
(Turkey) Barış Fidanoğlu
(Ukraine) Sergiy Chezkaskyy	D(2:1)
(Spain) Raúl Pandiella Gutiérrez
(Kazakhstan) Miras Brimzhanov	D(3:0)

Final
(Ukraine) Sergiy Chezkaskyy
(Kazakhstan) Miras Brimzhanov	D(3:0)

=== Key ===
Abbreviation	Meaning
D (3:0)	Decision (Unanimous)
D (2:1)	Decision (Split)
DQ	Disqualification

== See also ==
- List of WAKO Amateur World Championships
- List of WAKO Amateur European Championships
- List of male kickboxers
