= Men's Full-Contact at WAKO World Championships 2007 Coimbra -81 kg =

The men's light heavyweight (81 kg/178.2 lbs) Full-Contact category at the W.A.K.O. World Championships 2007 in Coimbra was the fourth heaviest of the male Full-Contact tournaments involving seventeen fighters from three continents (Europe, Asia and North America). Each of the matches was three rounds of two minutes each and were fought under Full-Contact rules.

As there were far too few fighters for a tournament designed for thirty-two, fourteen of the men received a bye through to the second round. The tournament champion was Nikita Kuzmin from Russia who defeated Ehram Majidov from Azerbaijan by unanimous decision in the final to win gold. Defeated semi finalists Dénes Rácz from Hungary and Micky Marshall from Canada won bronze medals.

== Results ==
1st Round
(Turkey) Goeksel Kotan | D(3:0)
(Austria) Bernhard Sussitz

2nd Round
(Greece) Dimitrios Dimitriou
(Russia) Nikita Kuzmin | D(3:0)
(Bulgaria) Martin Nachev
(Ukraine) Igor Prykhodko | KO
(Republic of Ireland) Robert Cassels
(United Kingdom) Andrew Wright | D(3:0)
(United States) Andrew Krzeptowski
(Canada) Micky Marshall | D(3:0)
(India) R.K Phalguni Singh
(Brazil) Adilson Fachin | AB
(Hungary) Dénes Rácz | D(3:0)
(Germany) Nicolai Schwarzer
(Portugal) Pedro Alves
(Azerbaijan) Ehram Majidov | D(3:0)
(Finland) Miika Lumilampi | TKO
(Turkey) Goeksel Kotan

Quarter Finals
(Russia) Nikita Kuzmin | D(3:0)
(Ukraine) Igor Prykhodko
(United Kingdom) Andrew Wright
(Canada) Micky Marshall | D(2:1)
(Brazil) Adilson Fachin
(Hungary) Dénes Rácz | D(3:0)
(Azerbaijan) Ehram Majidov | D(3:0)
(Finland) Miika Lumilampi

Semi Finals
(Russia) Nikita Kuzmin | D(3:0)
(Canada) Micky Marshall
(Hungary) Dénes Rácz
(Azerbaijan) Ehram Majidov | D(3:0)

Final
(Russia) Nikita Kuzmin | D(3:0)
(Azerbaijan) Ehram Majidov

=== Key ===
| Abbreviation | Meaning |
|---|---|
| D (3:0) | Decision (Unanimous) |
| D (2:1) | Decision (Split) |
| KO | Knockout |
| TKO | Technical Knockout |
| AB | Abandonment (Injury in match) |

== See also ==
- List of WAKO Amateur World Championships
- List of WAKO Amateur European Championships
- List of male kickboxers
