= Men's Semi-Contact at WAKO World Championships 2007 Coimbra -94 kg =

The men's 94 kg (206.8 lbs) Semi-Contact category at the W.A.K.O. World Championships 2007 in Coimbra was the second heaviest of the male Semi-Contact tournaments being the equivalent of super heavyweight when compared to Full-Contact's weight classes. There were fourteen fighters from three continents (Europe, Africa and North America) taking part in the competition. Each of the matches was three rounds of two minutes each and were fought under Semi-Contact rules.

As there were too few fighters for a tournament designed for sixteen, two of the men received a bye through to the quarter-finals. The gold medal was won by Pero Gazilj from Croatia who defeated opponent Michael Decain from Switzerland in the final by points decision. The two defeated semi finalists, Petr Kotik from Czech Republic and Great Britain's Mark Brown, won bronze medals.

== Results ==
These matches were decided on points.

1st round
(Czech Republic) Petr Kotik	10
(Greece) Dimitris Nalbantis	0
(United States) Christopher Rappold	5
(Germany) Michael Steier	15
(Switzerland) Michael Decain	17
(Italy) Andrea Ongaro	16
(United Kingdom) Mark Brown	13
(Hungary) Tibor Wappel	3
(Turkey) Özcan Çakmakçı	7
(Austria) Günther Weninger	16
(Ukraine) Andrey Kotov	8
(South Africa) Schalk Labuschagne	9

Quarter-finals
(Republic of Ireland) Colin O'Shaughnessy	6
(Czech Republic) Petr Kotik	16
(Germany) Michael Steier	8
(Switzerland) Michael Decain	18
(United Kingdom) Mark Brown	17
(Austria) Günther Weninger	11
(South Africa) Schalk Labuschagne	15
(Croatia) Pero Gazilj	16

Semi-finals
(Czech Republic) Petr Kotik	8
(Switzerland) Michael Decain	11
(United Kingdom) Mark Brown	15
(Croatia) Pero Gazilj	16

Final
(Switzerland) Michael Decain	20
(Croatia) Pero Gazilj	22

== See also ==
- List of WAKO Amateur World Championships
- List of WAKO Amateur European Championships
- List of male kickboxers
