= Men's Full-Contact at WAKO World Championships 2007 Coimbra -71 kg =

The men's light middleweight (71 kg/156.2 lbs) Full-Contact category at the W.A.K.O. World Championships 2007 in Coimbra was the sixth heaviest of the male Full-Contact tournaments, involving twenty-two fighters from five continents (Europe, Asia, North America, South America and Oceania). Each of the matches was three rounds of two minutes each and were fought under Full-Contact rules.

Due to the smaller than necessary numbers for a thirty-two man tournament, ten of the contestants had byes through to the second round. The tournament gold medallist was Russia's Evgeny Grechishkin who defeated Norway's Christian Kvatningen in the final by unanimous decision. Defeated semi finalists Ukraine's Dmytro Yatskov and Poland's Mariusz Ziętek received bronze medals.

== Results ==
1st Round
(Germany) Klemens Ruder	D(3:0)
(Croatia) Sanjin Pol Vrgoč
(United States) Jeremy Ramsey
(Kazakhstan) Mirat Musabaev	D(3:0)
(Norway) Christian Kvatningen	D(3:0)
(Latvia) Eduards Krauklis
(Turkey) Mehmet Ayguen	D(3:0)
(United Kingdom) Marty Wilson
(France) Nicholas Julien	D(3:0)
(Sweden) Emil Hossen
(Brazil) Lincoln Cavalcante
(Portugal) Diogo Neves	D(3:0)

2nd Round
(Ukraine) Dmytro Yatskov	TKO
(Hungary) Csaba Gyorffy
(Bulgaria) Svetoslav Maleshkov
(Germany) Klemens Ruder	D(3:0)
(Turkmenistan) Mekan Hojageldiyev
(Kazakhstan) Mirat Musabaev	D(3:0)
(Canada) John Nash
(Norway) Christian Kvatningen	KO
(Slovenia) Mitja Sauprl
(Turkey) Mehmet Ayguen	D(3:0)
(Russia) Evgeny Grechishkin	D(3:0)
(France) Nicholas Julien
(Spain) Enrique Reyes	D(2:1)
(Portugal) Diogo Neves
(New Zealand) Wiki Tutaki
(Poland) Mariusz Ziętek	D(2:1)

Quarter Finals
(Ukraine) Dmytro Yatskov	WO
(Germany) Klemens Ruder
(Kazakhstan) Mirat Musabaev
(Norway) Christian Kvatningen	D(3:0)
(Turkey) Mehmet Ayguen
(Russia) Evgeny Grechishkin	D(3:0)
(Spain) Enrique Reyes
(Poland) Mariusz Ziętek	D(3:0)

Semi Finals
(Ukraine) Dmytro Yatskov
(Norway) Christian Kvatningen	D(2:1)
(Russia) Evgeny Grechishkin	D(2:1)
(Poland) Mariusz Ziętek

Final
(Norway) Christian Kvatningen
(Russia) Evgeny Grechishkin	D(3:0)

=== Key ===
Abbreviation	Meaning
D (3:0)	Decision (Unanimous)
D (2:1)	Decision (Split)
KO	Knockout
TKO	Technical Knockout
WO	Walkover (No fight)

== See also ==
- List of WAKO Amateur World Championships
- List of WAKO Amateur European Championships
- List of male kickboxers
