= Women's Semi-Contact at WAKO World Championships 2007 Coimbra -55 kg =

The women's 55 kg (121 lbs) Semi-Contact category at the W.A.K.O. World Championships 2007 in Coimbra was the second lightest of the female Light-Contact tournaments falling between featherweight and lightweight when compared to Full-Contact's weight classes. There were fourteen women from two continents (Europe and North America) taking part in the competition. Each of the matches was three rounds of two minutes each and were fought under Semi-Contact rules.

Due to there being too few competitors for a tournament designed for sixteen, two of the women had a bye through to the quarter finals. The tournament gold medallist was Russia's Maria Kushtanova who added to the gold medal she won in the Light-Contact category at Belgrade earlier in the year, by defeating Norway's Eirin Dale in the final on points. Greece's Peny Galani and Ireland's Lorraine McDermott took bronze.

== Results ==
1st Round
(Canada) Lora Minicucci	15
(United States) Stephanie Wright	20
(Hungary) Klaudia Diligens	18
(United Kingdom) Kimberly Abdulla	8
(Russia) Maria Kushtanova	15
(Cyprus) Nellie Vergopoulou	5
(Italy) Adriana Tricoci	6
(Switzerland) Sandra Guzzetta	11
(Republic of Ireland) Lorraine McDermott	12
(Turkey) Asli Guenduez	5
(Germany) Natalia Hein	0
(Norway) Eirin Dale	10

Quarter Finals
(Greece) Peny Galani	15
(United States) Stephanie Wright	5
(Hungary) Klaudia Diligens	14
(Russia) Maria Kushtanova	16
(Switzerland) Sandra Guzzetta	13
(Republic of Ireland) Lorraine McDermott	20
(Norway) Eirin Dale	11
(Poland) Dorota Godzina	9

Semi Finals
(Greece) Peny Galani	4
(Russia) Maria Kushtanova	14
(Republic of Ireland) Lorraine McDermott	11
(Norway) Eirin Dale	14

Final
(Russia) Maria Kushtanova	14
(Norway) Eirin Dale	9

=== Key ===
Abbreviation	Meaning
D (3:0)	Decision (Unanimous)
D (2:1)	Decision (Split)
KO	Knockout
TKO	Technical Knockout
AB	Abandonment (Injury in match)
WO	Walkover (No fight)
DQ	Disqualification

== See also ==
- List of WAKO Amateur World Championships
- List of WAKO Amateur European Championships
- List of female kickboxers
