= Women's Semi-Contact at WAKO World Championships 2007 Coimbra -70 kg =

The women's 70 kg (154 lbs) Semi-Contact category at the W.A.K.O. World Championships 2007 in Coimbra was the second heaviest of the female Light-Contact tournaments being the equivalent of the heavyweight division when compared to Full-Contact's weight classes. There were eight women from two continents (Europe and North America) taking part in the competition. Each of the matches was three rounds of two minutes each and were fought under Semi-Contact rules.

The gold medal went to Hungary's Zsofia Minda who defeated German opponent Adriane Doppler in the final on points. Defeated semi finalists Russia's Liliya Saifullina and Croatian Ana Znaor had to make do with bronze.

== Results ==
These matches were decided on points.

Quarter Finals
(Hungary) Zsofia Minda	17
(United Kingdom) Jem Campbell	7
(Italy) Maria Mauriello	16
(Russia) Liliya Saifullina	20
(United States) Connie Sue Brazelton	6
(Germany) Adriane Doppler	16
(Turkey) Fatma Siyimer	9
(Croatia) Ana Znaor	19

Semi Finals
(Hungary) Zsofia Minda	14
(Russia) Liliya Saifullina	4
(Germany) Adriane Doppler	18
(Croatia) Ana Znaor	15

Final
(Hungary) Zsofia Minda	20
(Germany) Adriane Doppler	16

== See also ==
- List of WAKO Amateur World Championships
- List of WAKO Amateur European Championships
- List of female kickboxers
