= Team Semi-Contact at WAKO World Championships 2007 Coimbra =

As well as events for individuals, there was a Semi-Contact tournament for national teams at the W.A.K.O. World Championships 2007 in Coimbra. Each team consisted of four members – three men and one woman – with no weight categories, although fights were same-sex only (e.g. women faced women, men faced men). There were thirteen teams from two continents (Europe and North America) taking part in the competition and each of the matches was four rounds of one minute each (each fighter on a team fought one round against the opposing team, with the women fighting last), fought under Semi-Contact rules.

Due to there not being enough teams for a tournament designed for sixteen, three of the teams had byes through to the quarter-finals. The tournament gold medallists were Team Great Britain who defeated Team Hungary in the final by points decision. Team USA and Team Germany occupied the bronze medal spots.

== Results ==
1st round
(United States) Team USA | 37
Team Greece | 34
Team Poland | 23
Team Russia | 22
Team Italy | 13
Team Canada | 16
(United Kingdom) Team Great Britain | 25
(Republic of Ireland) Team Ireland | 11
Team Slovenia | 24
Team Austria | 16

Quarter-finals
Team Switzerland | 25
(United States) Team USA | 27
Team Poland | 8
Team Hungary | 17
Team Canada | 15
(United Kingdom) Team Great Britain | 20
Team Slovenia | 10
Team Germany | 22

Semi-finals
(United States) Team USA | 21
Team Hungary | 28
(United Kingdom) Team Great Britain | 20
Team Germany | 7

Final
Team Hungary | 15
(United Kingdom) Team Great Britain | 17

=== Key ===
| Abbreviation | Meaning |
|---|---|
| D (3:0) | Decision (Unanimous) |
| D (2:1) | Decision (Split) |
| KO | Knockout |
| TKO | Technical Knockout |
| AB | Abandonment (Injury in match) |
| WO | Walkover (No fight) |
| DQ | Disqualification |

== See also ==
- List of WAKO Amateur World Championships
- List of WAKO Amateur European Championships
- List of male kickboxers
- List of female kickboxers
