= W.A.K.O. World Championships (Coimbra) 2007 =

Kickboxing event in Coimbra, Portugal

W.A.K.O. World Championships 2007 (Coimbra)
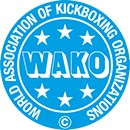
- The poster for W.A.K.O. World Championships 2007 (Coimbra)
- Promotion: W.A.K.O.
- Date: November 26 (Start); December 2, 2007 (End)
- Venue: Pavilhão Multiusos de Coimbra
- City: Coimbra, Portugal

Event chronology
W.A.K.O. World Championships 2007 in Belgrade	W.A.K.O. World Championships 2007 (Coimbra)	W.A.K.O. European Championships 2008 in Varna

W.A.K.O. World Championships 2007 in Coimbra were the joint 16th edition of the W.A.K.O. world championships and was the second event (the Belgrade event having been held a month previously). The championships were for amateur male and female kickboxers and martial artists, covering the following categories; Full-Contact, Semi-Contact, Musical Forms and Aero Kickboxing. In the contact kickboxing categories (Semi and Full), weight classes ranged from light bantamweight (51 kg/112 lbs) to super heavyweight (over 91 kg/200.6 lbs). The Musical Forms and Aero Kickboxing categories did not have weight classes but had different forms. More information on the categories, weight classes and rules is provided in the various sections below. In total there were around 600 competitors at the event, representing fifty countries from five continents, competing in forty-three competitions. The Coimbra championships were held at the Pavilhão Multiusos de Coimbra in Coimbra, Portugal from Monday, November 26 to Sunday, December 2, 2007.

== Full-Contact ==
Full-Contact is kickboxing where the intention is to defeat the opponent using legal techniques applying full force. Legal strikes include punches and kicks to the head (front, side and forehead), the torso (front and side) and foot/feet (sweeps). Attacks that are illegal include strikes to the top of the head, the back, the top of the shoulders, the neck and anywhere below the belt (except for foot sweeps). As with most forms of amateur competition, all fighters are required to wear protection for their head, teeth, breast (women only) groin, shin and feet, and must fight with the standard 10oz gloves.

A minimum of six kicks must be thrown each round or points may be deducted by the referee. Each fight is three, two-minute rounds and is scored by three judges. The judges will score successful (legal) strikes that are not blocked, and are thrown with full power. Illegal moves may result in points deduction or if repeated, disqualification. In the event of a draw after three rounds the judges will base the victor on who was stronger in the final round, or failing that will use their remarks from each round to deduce who wins. Victory can be achieved by a point's decision, technical knockout or knockout, abandonment (when one fighter gives up), disqualification or by a walkover (other fighter is unable to participate). If a fighter is knocked down three times in the fight he will automatically lose via technical knockout. More detail on Full-Contact rules can be found at the official W.A.K.O. website.

At Coimbra the men had twelve weight classes ranging from light bantamweight (51 kg/112.2 lbs) to super heavyweight (over 91 kg/200.2 lbs), while the women's had seven, ranging from bantamweight (51 kg/112.2 lbs) to super heavyweight (over 70 kg/154 lbs). By the end of the championships, the nation that dominated Full-Contact was Russia with an impressive haul of ten gold, four silvers and one bronze, in both the male and female categories.

=== Full-Contact (Men) Medals Table ===
Event	Gold	Silver	Bronze
Light Bantamweight -51 kg	Ivan Sciolla (Italy)	Zaur Mammadov (Poland)	Joaquin Lespedes Salas (Spain)
Light Bantamweight -51 kg	Ivan Sciolla (Italy)	Zaur Mammadov (Poland)	Ivan Bityutskikh (Russia)
Bantamweight -54 kg	Miras Brimzhanov (Kazakhstan)	Sergiy Chezkaskyy (Ukraine)	Raúl Pandiella Gutiérrez (Spain)
Bantamweight -54 kg	Miras Brimzhanov (Kazakhstan)	Sergiy Chezkaskyy (Ukraine)	Barış Fidanoğlu (Turkey)
Featherweight -57 kg	Damian Ławniczak (Poland)	Alexander Shamry (Russia)	Talgat Jusupov (Kazakhstan)
Featherweight -57 kg	Damian Ławniczak (Poland)	Alexander Shamry (Russia)	Elnur Salamov (Azerbaijan)
Lightweight -60 kg	Zurab Faroyan (Russia)	Eduard Mammadov (Azerbaijan)	Daniel Martins (France)
Lightweight -60 kg	Zurab Faroyan (Russia)	Eduard Mammadov (Azerbaijan)	Kornel Sandor (Hungary)
Light Welterweight -63.5 kg	Mardan Buzdaev (Kazakhstan)	Andrea Scaglione (Italy)	Brian Dickson (Canada)
Light Welterweight -63.5 kg	Mardan Buzdaev (Kazakhstan)	Andrea Scaglione (Italy)	Tomasz Pietraszewski (Poland)
Welterweight -67 kg	Vladimir Tarasov (Russia)	Stepan Avramidi (Kazakhstan)	Ramil Nadirov (Azerbaijan)
Welterweight -67 kg	Vladimir Tarasov (Russia)	Stepan Avramidi (Kazakhstan)	Edmond Mebenga (France)
Light Middleweight -71 kg	Evgeny Grechishkin (Russia)	Christian Kvatningen (Norway)	Mariusz Ziętek (Poland)
Light Middleweight -71 kg	Evgeny Grechishkin (Russia)	Christian Kvatningen (Norway)	Dmytro Yatskov (Ukraine)
Middleweight -75 kg	Azamat Belgibaev (Kazakhstan)	Manuchari Pipiya (Russia)	Francesco Margiotta (Italy)
Middleweight -75 kg	Azamat Belgibaev (Kazakhstan)	Manuchari Pipiya (Russia)	Alpay Kır (Turkey)
Light Heavyweight -81 kg	Nikita Kuzmin (Russia)	Ehram Majidov (Azerbaijan)	Dénes Rácz (Hungary)
Light Heavyweight -81 kg	Nikita Kuzmin (Russia)	Ehram Majidov (Azerbaijan)	Micky Marshall (Canada)
Cruiserweight -86 kg	Sergey Bogdan (Russia)	Sadibou Sy (Sweden)	Mairis Briedis (Latvia)
Cruiserweight -86 kg	Sergey Bogdan (Russia)	Sadibou Sy (Sweden)	Sergio Goncalves (Portugal)
Heavyweight -91 kg	Roman Beskishkov (Russia)	Milorad Gajović (Montenegro)	Denis Simkin (Ukraine)
Heavyweight -91 kg	Roman Beskishkov (Russia)	Milorad Gajović (Montenegro)	Bartłomiej Bocian (Poland)
Super Heavyweight +91 kg	Alexey Tokarev (Russia)	Marko Tomasović (Croatia)	Jukka Saarinen (Finland)
Super Heavyweight +91 kg	Alexey Tokarev (Russia)	Marko Tomasović (Croatia)	Tihamér Brunner (Hungary)

=== Full-Contact (Women) Medals Table ===
Event	Gold	Silver	Bronze
Bantamweight -48 kg	Olesya Gladkova (Russia)	Valeria Calabrese (Italy)	Mariyam Yegemberdiyeva (Kazakhstan)
Bantamweight -48 kg	Olesya Gladkova (Russia)	Valeria Calabrese (Italy)	Kuebra Lakot (Turkey)
Featherweight -52 kg	Eva Maria Naranjo (Spain)	Ekaterina Dumbrava (Russia)	Christina McMahon (Republic of Ireland)
Featherweight -52 kg	Eva Maria Naranjo (Spain)	Ekaterina Dumbrava (Russia)	Nadege Szikora (France)
Lightweight -56 kg	Mette Solli (Norway)	Zsuzsanna Szuknai (Hungary)	Jutta Nordberg (Finland)
Lightweight -56 kg	Mette Solli (Norway)	Zsuzsanna Szuknai (Hungary)	Ellada Dohosian (Ukraine)
Middleweight -60 kg	Monika Florek (Poland)	Nelli Glebova (Russia)	Bianca Amann (Austria)
Middleweight -60 kg	Monika Florek (Poland)	Nelli Glebova (Russia)	Letizia Bitozzi (Italy)
Light Heavyweight -65 kg	Katarzyna Furmaniak (Poland)	Nicole Trimmel (Austria)	Chiara Mandelli (Italy)
Light Heavyweight -65 kg	Katarzyna Furmaniak (Poland)	Nicole Trimmel (Austria)	Holly Deacon (Canada)
Heavyweight -70 kg	Olga Slavinskaya (Russia)	Birgit Oksnes (Norway)	Marija Pejakovic (Croatia)
Heavyweight -70 kg	Olga Slavinskaya (Russia)	Birgit Oksnes (Norway)	Tetyana Ivashenko (Ukraine)
Super Heavyweight +70 kg	Elena Kondratyeva (Russia)	Adina Cociern (Romania)	Zita Zatyko (Hungary)
Super Heavyweight +70 kg	Elena Kondratyeva (Russia)	Adina Cociern (Romania)	Karen Dews (France)

== Semi-Contact ==
This form of kickboxing is defined by the competitors trying to outscore one another with the use of light and well-controlled contact, with the emphasis being placed on delivery, technique and speed, using both legal hand and foot techniques. It is similar to Light-Contact kickboxing only that less force is used in Semi-Contact, with almost all fights won on points, although matches have been stopped by the referee due to a KO/TKO on rare occasions. Attacks are allowed to the head (front, side, back and forehead), torso (front and side) leg (foot sweeps only) and must be of reasonable force (not a push or a brush). Excessive force is prohibited as are attacks to the top of the head, back, top of shoulders, neck and below the belt (aside from foot sweeps) or any kicks using the heel (the sole of foot must be used instead). It is also illegal to grab an opponent or throw them to the ground. Semi-Contact is seen as a good starting position for fighters who want fight experience without the additional physicality of Full or (to a lesser extent) Light-Contact kickboxing. Despite the less physical nature all fighters are still required to wear protection for their head, teeth, breast (women only) groin, shin and feet, and must fight with the standard 10oz gloves.

Fighters score the following points for landing a controlled strike on their opponent; punch, kick to body, foot sweep (1 point), kick to head, jumping kick to body (2 points), jumping kick to head (3 points). Each fight is three, two-minute rounds and is scored by three judges. In the event of a draw the match will be scored electronically. Victory can be achieved by points decision, knockout or technical knockout (both rare), abandonment (when one fighter gives up), disqualification or by a walkover (the other fighter is unable to participate). More detail on Semi-Contact rules can be found at the official W.A.K.O. website.

Semi-Contact uses slightly different weight classes from Full-Contact kickboxing. At Coimbra the men's Semi-Contact competition had nine weight classes ranging from 57 kg/125.4 lbs to over 94 kg/206.8 lbs, while the women's had six, ranging from 50 kg/110 lbs to over 70 kg/154 lbs. There was also a team event at the competition, involving three men and one woman for each of the participating nations, with the woman to be paired against another woman only. By the end of the championships, Hungary was the top nation in Semi-Contact with four gold, three silver and two bronze medals, in the male, female and team categories.

=== Semi-Contact (Men) Medals Table ===
Event	Gold	Silver	Bronze
-57 kg	Robbie Lavoie (Canada)	Piotr Bąkowski (Poland)	Maxim Aysin (Russia)
-57 kg	Robbie Lavoie (Canada)	Piotr Bąkowski (Poland)	Dezső Debreczeni (Hungary)
-63 kg	Andrea Lucchese (Italy)	Viktor Hirsch (Hungary)	Juvan Klemen (Slovenia)
-63 kg	Andrea Lucchese (Italy)	Viktor Hirsch (Hungary)	Taskin Kahveci (Turkey)
-69 kg	Gregorio Di Leo (Italy)	Tamás Imre (Hungary)	Przemysław Ziemnicki (Poland)
-69 kg	Gregorio Di Leo (Italy)	Tamás Imre (Hungary)	Kostas Taboureas (Greece)
-74 kg	Robbie McMenamy (Republic of Ireland)	Nikos Memmos (Greece)	Jason Brown (Canada)
-74 kg	Robbie McMenamy (Republic of Ireland)	Nikos Memmos (Greece)	Jacey Cashman (United Kingdom)
-79 kg	Zsolt Moradi (Hungary)	Neri Stella (Italy)	Mark McDermott (Republic of Ireland)
-79 kg	Zsolt Moradi (Hungary)	Neri Stella (Italy)	Mitko Kostadinov (Bulgaria)
-84 kg	Jason Grenier (Canada)	Andreas Aggelopoulos (Greece)	Zvonimir Gribl (Croatia)
-84 kg	Jason Grenier (Canada)	Andreas Aggelopoulos (Greece)	Robert Knoedlseder (Germany)
-89 kg	Michael Page (United Kingdom)	Dave Heffernan (Republic of Ireland)	Roberto Montuoro (Italy)
-89 kg	Michael Page (United Kingdom)	Dave Heffernan (Republic of Ireland)	Michael Simmons (United States)
-94 kg	Pero Gazilj (Croatia)	Michael Decain (Switzerland)	Mark Brown (United Kingdom)
-94 kg	Pero Gazilj (Croatia)	Michael Decain (Switzerland)	Petr Kotik (Czech Republic)
+94 kg	Marco Culiersi (Italy)	Andy Hogan (Republic of Ireland)	Ranis Smajlovic (Slovenia)
+94 kg	Marco Culiersi (Italy)	Andy Hogan (Republic of Ireland)	Lee Matthews (United Kingdom)

=== Semi-Contact (Women) Medals Table ===
Event	Gold	Silver	Bronze
-50 kg	Reka Krempf (Hungary)	Sharon Gill (United Kingdom)	Fadeeva Svetlana (Russia)
-50 kg	Reka Krempf (Hungary)	Sharon Gill (United Kingdom)	Eygenia Kaskantiri (Greece)
-55 kg	Maria Kushtanova (Russia)	Eirin Dale (Norway)	Peny Galani (Greece)
-55 kg	Maria Kushtanova (Russia)	Eirin Dale (Norway)	Lorraine McDermott (Republic of Ireland)
-60 kg	Gloria De Bei (Italy)	Lisa Boardman (United Kingdom)	Emilia Szablowska (Poland)
-60 kg	Gloria De Bei (Italy)	Lisa Boardman (United Kingdom)	Klara Marton (Hungary)
-65 kg	Melanie Moder (Germany)	Chiara Leonardi (Italy)	Lorraine Hughes (United Kingdom)
-65 kg	Melanie Moder (Germany)	Chiara Leonardi (Italy)	Ina Grindheim (Norway)
-70 kg	Zsofia Minda (Hungary)	Adriane Doppler (Germany)	Ana Znaor (Croatia)
-70 kg	Zsofia Minda (Hungary)	Adriane Doppler (Germany)	Liliya Saifullina (Russia)
+70 kg	Anna Kondar (Hungary)	Natalie Cassidy (Republic of Ireland)	Oxana Kinakh (Russia)
+70 kg	Anna Kondar (Hungary)	Natalie Cassidy (Republic of Ireland)	Rosemarie James (United Kingdom)

=== Semi-Contact (Team) Medals Table ===
Event	Gold	Silver	Bronze
Team Semi-Contact	Team Great Britain (United Kingdom)	Team Hungary	Team Germany
Team Semi-Contact	Team Great Britain (United Kingdom)	Team Hungary	Team USA (United States)

== Musical Forms ==
Musical Forms is a non-physical competition which involves the contestant fighting against imaginary opponents using Martial Arts techniques to music of their choice. There are no weight classes as with most other W.A.K.O. categories although there are separate male and female competitions and, unlike the contact categories, an individual country was allowed more than one competitor. There are four separate categories in Musical Forms:

- Hard Styles – coming from Karate and Taekwondo, all competitors have 1 minute and 30 seconds to display their routine, as well as a 30-second presentation.
- Soft Styles – coming from Kung Fu and Wu-Sha, all competitors have 2 minutes to display their routine, as well as a 30-second presentation.
- Hard Styles with Weapons – using weapons such as Kama, Sai, Tonfa, Nunchaku, Bō, Katana, length of routine is the same as with Hard Styles, weapons must be blunt.
- Soft Styles with Weapons - Naginata, Nunchaku, Tai Chi Chuan Sword, Whip Chain, length of routine is the same as with Soft Styles, weapons must be blunt.

Points can be deducted for routines that are too short or go past the allocated time. Points are also deducted for contestants who drop weapons, loss of synchronization with the music, lose balance, perform illegal moves such as western break dancing etc. The competitors are allowed three gymnastic moves per performance, any more results in a point(s) deduction. Disqualification can occur if too many errors occur. Points are awarded for successful form and technique (e.g. delivery of kicks and punches), balance, degree of difficulty involved in a move, synchronization and more. The winner of each category is scored after seven presentations with points scored out of ten for the performance. If a fighter is tied on points after the presentation they will share a spot (or medal). More information on Musical Forms and the rules can be found on the W.A.K.O. website. By the end of the championships, Russia was the strongest nation in Musical Forms having won four golds, four silvers and five bronzes in both the male and female categories.

=== Musical Forms (Men) Medals Table ===
Event	Gold	Silver	Bronze
Hard Styles	Daniel Sterling (United Kingdom)	Robert Andreozzi (United States)	Andrey Bosak (Russia)
Soft Styles	Andrey Bosak (Russia)	Michael Moeller (Germany)	Evgeny Krylov (Russia)
Hard Styles - Weapons	Andrey Savushkin (Russia)	Robert Andreozzi (United States); Daniel Stirling (United Kingdom); Andrey Bosak (Russia)	Michael Moeller (Germany)
Soft Styles - Weapons	Evgeny Krylov (Russia)	Andrey Bosak (Russia)	Michael Moeller (Germany)

=== Musical Forms (Women) Medals Table ===
Event	Gold	Silver	Bronze
Hard Styles	Jessica Holmes (United Kingdom)	Olga Kudinova (Russia)	Elena Chirkova (Russia)
Soft Styles	Veronika Dombrovskaya (Belarus)	Elena Chirkova (Russia)	Inna Berestova (Russia)
Hard Styles - Weapons	Veronika Dombrovskaya (Belarus)	Maria Pekarchik (Belarus)	Ekaterina Chizhikova (Russia)
Soft Styles - Weapons	Ekaterina Chizhikova (Russia)	Elena Chirkova (Russia)	Veronika Dombrovskaya (Belarus)

== Aero Kickboxing ==
As with Musical Forms, Aero Kickboxing is a non physical competition, involving aerobic and kickboxing techniques in time to specifically selected music. This music must be between 135 and 155 b.p.m. and must not contain any swear words or inappropriate noises. There are no weight divisions like in other forms of kickboxing in W.A.K.O. but there are separate male, female and team categories, each split into 'with (aerobic) step' or 'without (aerobic) step', and, unlike the contact categories, an individual country was allowed more than one competitor, with the team event even having several teams from the same country. Each performance must be between 1.5 and 2 minutes long and be 70% kickboxing and 30% aerobics, with at least five kicks/punches per period (every 32 musical beats).

Points are deducted for any hesitation or loss of balance, insufficient number of kickboxing or aerobic techniques, touching the floor with any part of body other than the feet, over repetition of the same moves, and loss of synchronization with teammates in team competition. Competitors can be disqualified for inappropriate music (with swearing/unsuitable noises) or the wearing of sports bras. Points are rewarded for clean technique with difficulty of moves being taken into consideration and good synchronization with teammates in team competition. The winner of each category is scored after seven separate performances, with points scored between 7 and 10 for each performance. More information on Musical Forms and the rules can be found on the W.A.K.O. website. Hungary and Slovenia were joint top in Aero Kickboxing at the end of the championships, having won two golds and two silvers each.

=== Aero Kickboxing (Men) Medals Table ===
Event	Gold	Silver	Bronze
Aero Individual without Step	Kevin Moroy (France)	Daniele De Santis (Italy)	Eric Dubois (Canada)

=== Aero Kickboxing (Women) Medals Table ===
Event	Gold	Silver	Bronze
Aero Individual with Step	Manja Simonic (Slovenia); Valerija Lukani (Croatia)	Petra Kmetec (Slovenia); Marianna Hegyi (Hungary)	Laura Fiori (Italy)
Aero Individual without Step	Bianca Barada-Tapilatu (Slovenia)	Brigitta Gazdag (Hungary)	Laura Fiori (Italy)

=== Aero Kickboxing (Team) Medals Table ===
Event	Gold	Silver	Bronze
Aero Team with Step	Team Hungary	Team Portugal	Team Croatia
Aero Team without Step	Team Hungary	Team Slovenia	Team Croatia III

== Overall Medals Standing (Top 5) ==
The top nation at the W.A.K.O. Amateur World Championships in Coimbra was Russia (who was also the top nation at the event held in Belgrade the previous month). The country gained fifteen golds, nine silvers and ten bronzes, across all categories, male and female.

Ranking	Country	Gold (gold)	Silver (silver)	Bronze (bronze)
1	Russia	15	9	10
2	Hungary	6	6	6
3	Italy	5	5	6
4	(United Kingdom) Great Britain	3	2	6
5	Poland	3	1	5

== See also ==
- List of WAKO Amateur World Championships
- List of WAKO Amateur European Championships
